= 2011 MasterCard Tennis Cup – Women's singles =

Women's singles
- 2011 MasterCard Tennis Cup

Final
- Champion: (Paraguay) Verónica Cepede Royg
- Runner-up: (Venezuela) Adriana Pérez
- Score: 7–6^{(7–4)}, 7–5

Events
Singles	men	women
Doubles	men	women
← 2010 ·	MasterCard Tennis Cup	· 2012 →

Aranza Salut was the defending champion, but chose not to participate.

Verónica Cepede Royg won the title, defeating Adriana Pérez 7–6^{(7–4)}, 7–5 in the final.

== Seeds ==
1. (Brazil) Ana-Clara Duarte (quarterfinals)
2. (Brazil) Roxane Vaisemberg (quarterfinals)
3. (Paraguay) Verónica Cepede Royg (champion)
4. (Brazil) Teliana Pereira (first round)
5. (Argentina) Mailen Auroux (first round)
6. (Brazil) Vivian Segnini (semifinals)
7. (Chile) Andrea Koch Benvenuto (quarterfinals)
8. (Argentina) Andrea Benítez (quarterfinals)

== Main draw ==
=== Key ===
- Q = Qualifier
- WC = Wild card
- LL = Lucky loser
- Alt = Alternate
- SE = Special exempt
- PR = Protected ranking
- ITF = ITF entry
- JE = Junior exempt
- w/o = Walkover
- r = Retired
- d = Defaulted
- SR = Special ranking

=== Finals ===
Semifinals
6	(Brazil) Vivian Segnini	3	4
(Venezuela) Adriana Pérez	6	6
3	(Paraguay) Verónica Cepede Royg	6	5	6
(Venezuela) Andrea Gámiz	0	7	2

Final
(Venezuela) Adriana Pérez	6^{4}	5
3	(Paraguay) Verónica Cepede Royg	7^{7}	7

=== Top half ===
First round
1	(Brazil) A-C Duarte	6	6
WC	(Brazil) M Danzini	4	1
(Italy) L Rafful	1	1
(Paraguay) I Robbiani	6	6
(Brazil) N Rossi	6	1	2
(Argentina) C Zeballos	4	6	6
Q	(Brazil) G Cé	5	2
6	(Brazil) V Segnini	7	6
4	(Brazil) T Pereira	1	3
(Venezuela) A Pérez	6	6
(Brazil) M Albuquerque	6	6
Q	(India) K Shroff	2	2
Q	(Peru) P Kú Flores	6	6
Q	(Argentina) B Luduena	1	1
(Brazil) MF Alves	3	4
8	(Argentina) A Benítez	6	6

Second round
1	(Brazil) A-C Duarte	6	7^{7}
(Paraguay) I Robbiani	1	6^{1}
(Argentina) C Zeballos	7^{7}	1	3
6	(Brazil) V Segnini	6^{3}	6	6
(Venezuela) A Pérez	6	6
(Brazil) M Albuquerque	4	0
Q	(Peru) P Kú Flores	2	3
8	(Argentina) A Benítez	6	6

Quarterfinals
1	(Brazil) A-C Duarte	6	5	2
6	(Brazil) V Segnini	3	7	6
(Venezuela) A Pérez	6	3	7
8	(Argentina) A Benítez	3	6	5

Semifinals
6	(Brazil) V Segnini	3	4
(Venezuela) A Pérez	6	6

=== Bottom half ===
First round
7	(Chile) A Koch Benvenuto	6	6
(Brazil) C Forte	3	2
WC	(Brazil) B Haddad Maia	2	3
(Colombia) K Castiblanco	6	6
WC	(Brazil) PC Gonçalves	6	6
(Brazil) F Hermenegildo	3	1
Q	(Brazil) L Pigossi	2	2
3	(Paraguay) V Cepede Royg	6	6
5	(Argentina) M Auroux	6	1	6^{4}
(Venezuela) A Gámiz	1	6	7^{7}
Q	(South Africa) N Fourouclas	6	6
Q	(Brazil) K Souza	3	1
(Brazil) N Kurata	6	6
Q	(Brazil) P Garcia	2	3
WC	(Brazil) E Piai	3	1
2	(Brazil) R Vaisemberg	6	6

Second round
7	(Chile) A Koch Benvenuto	6	6
(Colombia) K Castiblanco	1	2
WC	(Brazil) PC Gonçalves	2	3
3	(Paraguay) V Cepede Royg	6	6
(Venezuela) A Gámiz	6	6
(South Africa) N Fourouclas	3	4
(Brazil) N Kurata	2	0
2	(Brazil) R Vaisemberg	6	6

Quarterfinals
7	(Chile) A Koch Benvenuto	6	4	4
3	(Paraguay) V Cepede Royg	4	6	6
(Venezuela) A Gámiz	6	6
2	(Brazil) R Vaisemberg	2	3

Semifinals
3	(Paraguay) V Cepede Royg	6	5	6
(Venezuela) A Gámiz	0	7	2
