= 2011 MasterCard Tennis Cup – Women's doubles =

Women's doubles
- 2011 MasterCard Tennis Cup

Final
- Champions: (Brazil) Fernanda Hermenegildo (Brazil) Teliana Pereira
- Runners-up: (Brazil) Maria Fernanda Alves (Brazil) Roxane Vaisemberg
- Score: 3–6, 7–6^{(7–5)}, [11–9]

Events
Singles	men	women
Doubles	men	women
← 2010 ·	MasterCard Tennis Cup	· 2012 →

Fernanda Faria and Paula Cristina Gonçalves were the defending champions, but lost in the first round.

Fernanda Hermenegildo and Teliana Pereira won the tournament by defeating Maria Fernanda Alves and Roxane Vaisemberg in the final 3–6, 7–6^{(7–5)}, [11–9].

== Seeds ==
1. (Brazil) Maria Fernanda Alves / (Brazil) Roxane Vaisemberg (final)
2. (Argentina) Mailen Auroux / (Brazil) Vivian Segnini (semifinals)
3. (Colombia) Karen Castiblanco / (Venezuela) Adriana Pérez (quarterfinals)
4. (Brazil) Fernanda Faria / (Brazil) Paula Cristina Gonçalves (first round)

== Draw ==
=== Key ===
- Q = Qualifier
- WC = Wild card
- LL = Lucky loser
- Alt = Alternate
- SE = Special exempt
- PR = Protected ranking
- ITF = ITF entry
- JE = Junior exempt
- w/o = Walkover
- r = Retired
- d = Defaulted
- SR = Special ranking

First round
1	(Brazil) MF Alves (Brazil) R Vaisemberg	6	3	[10]
(Brazil) L Pigossi (Brazil) N Rossi	2	6	[6]
WC	(Brazil) M Danzini (Brazil) S Dos Reis	3	4
(Argentina) A Benítez (Brazil) R Piltcher	6	6
4	(Brazil) F Faria (Brazil) PC Gonçalves	6	3	[8]
(Venezuela) A Gámiz (Chile) A Koch Benvenuto	4	6	[10]
(Paraguay) V Cepede Royg (Brazil) F Guimarães Bueno	6	7^{7}
(Brazil) M Albuquerque (Brazil) C Forte	3	6^{5}
(Brazil) F Hermenegildo (Brazil) T Pereira	6	6
(Brazil) E Piai (Brazil) K Souza	4	1
(India) K Shroff (Argentina) C Zeballos	3	4
3	(Colombia) K Castiblanco (Venezuela) A Pérez	6	6
WC	(Brazil) G Cé (Brazil) P Garcia	2	1
(Brazil) A-C Duarte (Brazil) B Haddad Maia	6	6
WC	(Brazil) F Dechandt Araújo (Brazil) G Tomita	2	3
2	(Argentina) M Auroux (Brazil) V Segnini	6	6

Quarterfinals
1	(Brazil) MF Alves (Brazil) R Vaisemberg	6	6
(Argentina) A Benítez (Brazil) R Piltcher	0	0
(Venezuela) A Gámiz (Chile) A Koch Benvenuto	1	6	[7]
(Paraguay) V Cepede Royg (Brazil) F Guimarães Bueno	6	3	[10]
(Brazil) F Hermenegildo (Brazil) T Pereira	6	3	[10]
3	(Colombia) K Castiblanco (Venezuela) A Pérez	2	6	[5]
(Brazil) A-C Duarte (Brazil) B Haddad Maia	1	2
2	(Argentina) M Auroux (Brazil) V Segnini	6	6

Semifinals
1	(Brazil) MF Alves (Brazil) R Vaisemberg	7^{7}	6
(Paraguay) V Cepede Royg (Brazil) F Guimarães Bueno	6^{4}	1
(Brazil) F Hermenegildo (Brazil) T Pereira	6	7^{7}
2	(Argentina) M Auroux (Brazil) V Segnini	4	6^{5}

Finals
1	(Brazil) MF Alves (Brazil) R Vaisemberg	6	6^{5}	[9]
(Brazil) F Hermenegildo (Brazil) T Pereira	3	7^{7}	[11]
