= 2011 MasterCard Tennis Cup =

- Date: 25–31 July (women); 1–7 August (men)
- Edition: 10th (women); 11th (men)
- Location: Campos do Jordão, Brazil

Champions

Men's singles
- (Brazil) Rogério Dutra da Silva

Women's singles
- (Paraguay) Verónica Cepede Royg

Men's doubles
- (Colombia) Juan Sebastián Cabal / (Colombia) Robert Farah

Women's doubles
- (Brazil) Fernanda Hermenegildo / (Brazil) Teliana Pereira
- MasterCard Tennis Cup

The 2011 MasterCard Tennis Cup was a professional tennis tournament played on hard courts. It was the eleventh edition of the tournament which was part of the 2011 ATP Challenger Tour and the tenth edition for the 2011 ITF Women's Circuit. It took place in Campos do Jordão, Brazil between 25 and 31 July for women and 1 and 7 August 2011 for men.

== ATP entrants ==
=== Seeds ===
Country	Player	Rank^{1}	Seed
BRA	Ricardo Mello	91	1
ARG	Horacio Zeballos	108	2
RSA	Izak van der Merwe	115	3
CHI	Paul Capdeville	117	4
BRA	Rogério Dutra da Silva	129	5
ARG	Brian Dabul	163	6
BRA	Júlio Silva	175	7
COL	Carlos Salamanca	180	8

- ^{1} Rankings are as of July 25, 2011.

=== Other entrants ===
The following players received wildcards into the singles main draw:

- (Brazil) Guilherme Clézar
- (Brazil) Marcelo Demoliner
- (Brazil) Thiago Moura Monteiro
- (Brazil) João Pedro Sorgi

The following players received entry from the qualifying draw:

- (Argentina) Cristián Benedetti
- (Brazil) Fabiano de Paula
- (Brazil) Tiago Lopes
- (Brazil) Thales Turini

== WTA entrants ==
=== Seeds ===
Country	Player	Rank^{1}	Seed
BRA	Ana Clara Duarte	227	1
BRA	Roxane Vaisemberg	283	2
PAR	Verónica Cepede Royg	304	3
BRA	Teliana Pereira	292	4
ARG	Mailen Auroux	320	5
BRA	Vivian Segnini	325	6
CHI	Andrea Koch Benvenuto	352	7
ARG	Andrea Benítez	355	8

- ^{1} Rankings are as of July 18, 2011.

=== Other entrants ===
The following players received wildcards into the singles main draw:

- (Brazil) Maria Danzini
- (Brazil) Paula Cristina Gonçalves
- (Brazil) Beatriz Haddad Maia
- (Brazil) Eduarda Piai

The following players received entry from the qualifying draw:

- (Brazil) Gabriela Cé
- (South Africa) Natasha Fourouclas
- (Brazil) Priscila Garcia
- (Peru) Patricia Kú Flores
- (Argentina) Belen Luduena
- (Brazil) Laura Pigossi
- (India) Kyra Shroff
- (Brazil) Karina Souza

== Champions ==
=== Men's singles ===
(Brazil) Rogério Dutra da Silva def. (South Africa) Izak van der Merwe, 6–4, 6–7^{(7–5)}, 6–3

=== Women's singles ===
(Paraguay) Verónica Cepede Royg def. (Venezuela) Adriana Pérez, 7–6^{(7–4)}, 7–5

=== Men's doubles ===
(Colombia) Juan Sebastián Cabal / (Colombia) Robert Farah def. (Brazil) Ricardo Hocevar / (Brazil) Júlio Silva, 6–2, 6–3

=== Women's doubles ===
(Brazil) Fernanda Hermenegildo / (Brazil) Teliana Pereira def. (Brazil) Maria Fernanda Alves / (Brazil) Roxane Vaisemberg, 3–6, 7–6^{(7–5)}, [11–9]
