= 2011 MasterCard Tennis Cup – Men's doubles =

Men's doubles
- 2011 MasterCard Tennis Cup

Final
- Champions: (Colombia) Juan Sebastián Cabal (Colombia) Robert Farah
- Runners-up: (Brazil) Ricardo Hocevar (Brazil) Júlio Silva
- Score: 6–2, 6–3

Events
Singles	men	women
Doubles	men	women
← 2010 ·	MasterCard Tennis Cup	· 2012 →

Rogério Dutra da Silva and Júlio Silva were the defending champions, but they decided not to participate together.
Dutra da Silva played alongside Tiago Fernandes. They lost in the semifinals against Juan Sebastián Cabal and Robert Farah. Silva partners up with Ricardo Hocevar.

Colombian pair Cabal and Farah won the title. They defeated Ricardo Hocevar and Júlio Silva 6–2, 6–3 in the final.

== Seeds ==
1. (Colombia) Juan Sebastián Cabal / (Colombia) Robert Farah (champions)
2. (Argentina) Brian Dabul / (Uruguay) Marcel Felder (semifinals)
3. (Colombia) Carlos Salamanca / (South Africa) Izak van der Merwe (first round)
4. (Chile) Guillermo Rivera-Aránguiz / (Chile) Cristóbal Saavedra-Corvalán (quarterfinals, withdrew)

== Draw ==
Key

- Q = Qualifier
- WC = Wild card
- LL = Lucky loser
- Alt = Alternate
- ITF = ITF entry
- PR = Protected ranking
- SR = Special ranking
- SE = Special exempt
- JE = Junior exempt
- JR = Junior Accelerator Programme entrant
- CO = College Accelerator Programme entrant
- NG = Next Gen Accelerator Program entrant
- w/o = Walkover
- r = Retired
- d = Defaulted

=== Draw ===
First round
1	(Colombia) JS Cabal (Colombia) R Farah	6	7^{7}
WC	(Brazil) F de Paula (Brazil) Diego Matos	4	6^{4}
(Brazil) J Pereira (Brazil) F Romboli	4	2
(Brazil) R Grilli (Brazil) A Miele	6	6
4	(Chile) G Rivera-Aránguiz (Chile) C Saavedra-Corvalán	7^{7}	1	[10]
(Argentina) Cristián Benedetti (Chile) P Capdeville	6^{5}	6	[6]
WC	(Brazil) T Moura Monteiro (Brazil) JP Sorgi	3	2
(Brazil) R Dutra da Silva (Brazil) T Fernandes	6	6
(Sweden) C Lindell (Brazil) Tiago Lopes	4	3
(Brazil) D Dutra da Silva (Argentina) D Schwartzman	6	6
(Brazil) R Hocevar (Brazil) J Silva	6	6
3	(Colombia) C Salamanca (South Africa) I van der Merwe	4	4
(Brazil) G Clézar (Brazil) C Zampieri	6^{3}	6	[10]
WC	(Brazil) E Dischinger (Brazil) T Turini	7^{7}	3	[4]
(Brazil) Rafael Camilo (Brazil) M Demoliner	6^{6}	4
2	(Argentina) B Dabul (Uruguay) M Felder	7^{8}	6

Quarterfinals
1	(Colombia) JS Cabal (Colombia) R Farah	6	6
(Brazil) R Grilli (Brazil) A Miele	4	1
4	(Chile) G Rivera-Aránguiz (Chile) C Saavedra-Corvalán
(Brazil) R Dutra da Silva (Brazil) T Fernandes	w/o
(Brazil) D Dutra da Silva (Argentina) D Schwartzman	5	3
(Brazil) R Hocevar (Brazil) J Silva	7	6
(Brazil) G Clézar (Brazil) C Zampieri	6	3	[8]
2	(Argentina) B Dabul (Uruguay) M Felder	3	6	[10]

Semifinals
1	(Colombia) JS Cabal (Colombia) R Farah	7^{7}	6
(Brazil) R Dutra da Silva (Brazil) T Fernandes	6^{2}	2
(Brazil) R Hocevar (Brazil) J Silva	4	7	[10]
2	(Argentina) B Dabul (Uruguay) M Felder	6	5	[8]

Final
1	(Colombia) JS Cabal (Colombia) R Farah	6	6
(Brazil) R Hocevar (Brazil) J Silva	2	3
