= 2011 MasterCard Tennis Cup – Men's singles =

Men's singles
- 2011 MasterCard Tennis Cup

Final
- Champion: (Brazil) Rogério Dutra da Silva
- Runner-up: (South Africa) Izak van der Merwe
- Score: 6–4, 6–7^{(5–7)}, 6–3

Events
Singles	men	women
Doubles	men	women
← 2010 ·	MasterCard Tennis Cup	· 2012 →

Rogério Dutra da Silva won the title. He defeated the defending champion, Izak van der Merwe, 6–4, 6–7^{(7–5)}, 6–3 in the final.

== Seeds ==
1. (Brazil) Ricardo Mello (semifinals)
2. (Argentina) Horacio Zeballos (second round)
3. (South Africa) Izak van der Merwe (final)
4. (Chile) Paul Capdeville (quarterfinals)
5. (Brazil) Rogério Dutra da Silva (champion)
6. (Argentina) Brian Dabul (semifinals)
7. (Brazil) Júlio Silva (quarterfinals)
8. (Colombia) Carlos Salamanca (quarterfinals)

== Draw ==
=== Key ===
- Q = Qualifier
- WC = Wild card
- LL = Lucky loser
- Alt = Alternate
- SE = Special exempt
- PR = Protected ranking
- ITF = ITF entry
- JE = Junior exempt
- w/o = Walkover
- r = Retired
- d = Defaulted
- SR = Special ranking

=== Finals ===
Semifinals
1	(Brazil) Ricardo Mello	6^{1}	4
3	(South Africa) Izak van der Merwe	7^{7}	6
6	(Argentina) Brian Dabul	6^{1}	6	6^{3}
5	(Brazil) Rogério Dutra da Silva	7^{7}	2	7^{7}

Final
3	(South Africa) Izak van der Merwe	4	7^{7}	3
5	(Brazil) Rogério Dutra da Silva	6	6^{5}	6

=== Top half ===
First round
1	(Brazil) R Mello	6	6
(Brazil) C Zampieri	2	3
(Brazil) T Alves	4
(Portugal) G Elias	1^{r}
(Brazil) Rafael Camilo	6^{5}	6	3
WC	(Brazil) G Clézar	7^{7}	3	6
(Chile) C Saavedra-Corvalán	2	7^{7}	2
7	(Brazil) J Silva	6	6^{5}	6
3	(South Africa) I van der Merwe	6	6
Q	(Brazil) F de Paula	4	1
Q	(Brazil) T Turini	6	1	4
(Brazil) A Miele	3	6	6
(Brazil) F Romboli	4	3
(Uruguay) M Felder	6	6
(Colombia) JS Cabal	1	5
8	(Colombia) C Salamanca	6	7

Second round
1	(Brazil) R Mello	7^{7}	6
(Brazil) T Alves	6^{2}	1
WC	(Brazil) G Clézar	4	7^{7}	1
7	(Brazil) J Silva	6	6^{5}	6
3	(South Africa) I van der Merwe	7^{7}	6
(Brazil) A Miele	6^{5}	3
(Uruguay) M Felder	6	6^{6}	5
8	(Colombia) C Salamanca	2	7^{8}	7

Quarterfinals
1	(Brazil) R Mello	7^{7}	6
7	(Brazil) J Silva	6^{5}	4
3	(South Africa) I van der Merwe	6	7^{7}
8	(Colombia) C Salamanca	4	6^{3}

Semifinals
1	(Brazil) R Mello	6^{1}	4
3	(South Africa) I van der Merwe	7^{7}	6

=== Bottom half ===
First round
6	(Argentina) B Dabul	7^{7}	6
(Brazil) R Hocevar	6^{2}	0
Q	(Argentina) Cristián Benedetti	3	7^{11}	5
Q	(Brazil) Tiago Lopes	6	6^{9}	7
(Brazil) D Dutra da Silva	5	3
WC	(Brazil) JP Sorgi	7	6
(Sweden) C Lindell	3	7	2
4	(Chile) P Capdeville	6	5	6
5	(Brazil) R Dutra da Silva	7	6
(Argentina) D Schwartzman	5	2
(Chile) G Rivera-Aránguiz	6	7^{7}
WC	(Brazil) M Demoliner	3	6^{5}
(Colombia) R Farah	6	7
(Brazil) T Fernandes	3	5
WC	(Brazil) T Moura Monteiro	4	3
2	(Argentina) H Zeballos	6	6

Second round
6	(Argentina) B Dabul	6	6
Q	(Brazil) Tiago Lopes	2	1
WC	(Brazil) JP Sorgi	3	1
4	(Chile) P Capdeville	6	6
5	(Brazil) R Dutra da Silva	7	6
(Chile) G Rivera-Aránguiz	5	3
(Colombia) R Farah	6^{7}	6	7^{7}
2	(Argentina) H Zeballos	7^{9}	3	6^{5}

Quarterfinals
6	(Argentina) B Dabul	6	6^{4}	7^{7}
4	(Chile) P Capdeville	4	7^{7}	6^{5}
5	(Brazil) R Dutra da Silva	6	6
(Colombia) R Farah	3	2

Semifinals
6	(Argentina) B Dabul	6^{1}	6	6^{3}
5	(Brazil) R Dutra da Silva	7^{7}	2	7^{7}
