= Torneio Internacional de Tênis Campos do Jordão =

Defunct tennis tournament
- Event name: Campos do Jordão
- Location: Campos do Jordão, Brazil
- Venue: Tênis Clube de Turismo
- Surface: Hard
- Website: www.trysports.com.br
ATP Tour
- Category: ATP Challenger Tour
- Draw: 32S / 32Q / 16D
- Prize money: $50,000+H
WTA Tour
- Category: ITF Women's Circuit
- Draw: 32S / 32Q / 16D
- Prize money: $15,000

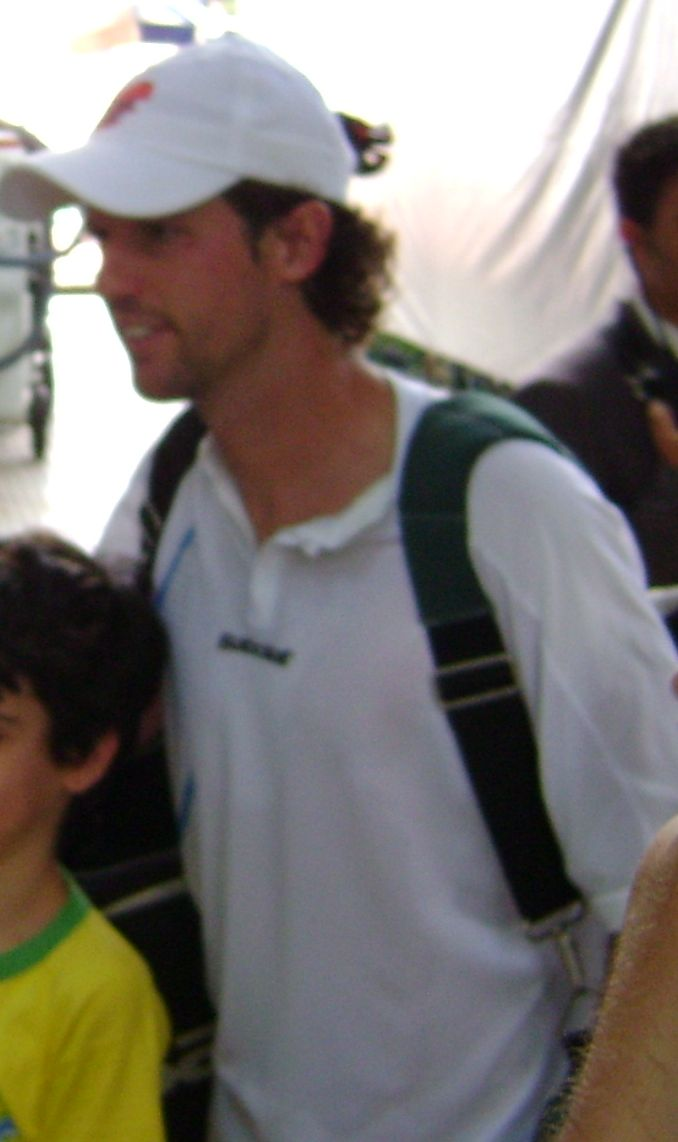
Brazil's Ricardo Mello won the singles in 2002 and 2006, and the doubles in 2004 with Iván Miranda

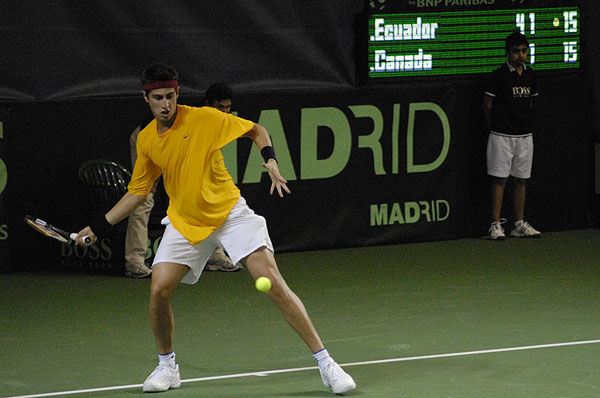
Ecuadorian Giovanni Lapentti clinched victories in singles and doubles (with Rik de Voest) in 2003

The Torneio Internacional de Tênis Campos do Jordão (previously known as the Credicard Citi MasterCard Tennis Cup) was a professional tennis tournament played on outdoor hardcourts. It was part of the ITF Women's Circuit and the ATP Challenger Tour. It was held annually at the Campos do Jordão Tênis Clube de Turismo in Campos do Jordão, Brazil, from 2001 to 2017.

== Past finals ==
=== Men's singles ===
Year	Champion	Runner-up	Score
2011	(Brazil) Rogério Dutra da Silva	(South Africa) Izak van der Merwe	6–4, 6–7^{(7–5)}, 6–3
2010	(South Africa) Izak van der Merwe	(Brazil) Ricardo Mello	7–6(6), 6–3
2009	(Argentina) Horacio Zeballos	(Brazil) Thiago Alves	6–7(4), 6–4, 6–3
2008	(Argentina) Brian Dabul	(South Africa) Izak van der Merwe	7–5, 6–7(6), 6–3
2007	(Argentina) Brian Dabul	(Colombia) Michael Quintero	7–5, 7–5
2006	(Brazil) Ricardo Mello	(Slovakia) Ivo Klec	6–3, 6–4
2005	(Brazil) André Sá	(Argentina) Juan Martín del Potro	6–4, 6–4
2004	(Japan) Takao Suzuki	(Ecuador) Giovanni Lapentti	6–4, 6–3
2003	(Ecuador) Giovanni Lapentti	(Japan) Gouichi Motomura	6–4, 6–0
2002	(Brazil) Ricardo Mello	(Germany) Maximilian Abel	7–6(2), 6–3
2001	(Paraguay) Ramón Delgado	(Brazil) Daniel Melo	7–6(3), 6–2

=== Women's singles ===
Year	Champion	Runner-up	Score
2017(2)	(Brazil) Nathaly Kurata	(Brazil) Gabriela Cé	7–6^{(9–7)}, 6–4
2017(1)	(Brazil) Gabriela Cé	(Argentina) Guillermina Naya	6–4, 7–6^{(7–3)}
2016	(Chile) Daniela Seguel	(Bulgaria) Aleksandrina Naydenova	7–5, 4–6, 7–5
2015	Not held		
2014	(Brazil) Gabriela Cé	(Brazil) Eduarda Piai	6–3, 6–2
2013	(Brazil) Paula Cristina Gonçalves	(Argentina) María Irigoyen	3–6, 7–5, 6–1
2012	(Argentina) María Irigoyen	(Croatia) Donna Vekić	7–5, 6–0
2011	(Paraguay) Verónica Cepede Royg	(Venezuela) Adriana Pérez	7–6^{(7–4)}, 7–5
2010	(Argentina) Aranza Salut	(Bolivia) María Fernanda Álvarez Terán	2–6, 7–5, 6–3
2009	Not held		
2008	(Argentina) Jorgelina Cravero	(Argentina) Florencia Molinero	6–3, 6–2
2007	(Brazil) Teliana Pereira	(Brazil) Maria Fernanda Alves	6–4, 6–2
2006	(Argentina) María José Argeri	(Argentina) Betina Jozami	4–6, 6–2, 6–3
2005	(Brazil) Maria Fernanda Alves	(Argentina) María José Argeri	6–3, 7–5
2004	(Brazil) Maria Fernanda Alves	(Hungary) Katalin Marosi	7–5, 7–6^{(7–2)}
2003	(Portugal) Frederica Piedade	(Brazil) Maria Fernanda Alves	6–3, 2–6, 6–4
2002	(Netherlands) Jolanda Mens	(Brazil) Maria Fernanda Alves	6–2, 4–6, 6–2

=== Men's doubles ===
Year	Champions	Runners-up	Score
2011	(Colombia) Juan Sebastián Cabal (Colombia) Robert Farah	(Brazil) Ricardo Hocevar (Brazil) Júlio Silva	6–2, 6–3
2010	(Brazil) Rogério Dutra da Silva (Brazil) Júlio Silva	(Brazil) Vítor Manzini (Brazil) Pedro Zerbinni	7–6(3), 6–2
2009	(United Kingdom) Joshua Goodall (Australia) Samuel Groth	(Brazil) Rogério Dutra da Silva (Brazil) Júlio Silva	7–6(4), 6–3
2008	(Argentina) Brian Dabul (Uruguay) Marcel Felder	(Brazil) Márcio Torres (South Africa) Izak van der Merwe	6–4, 7–6(9)
2007	(Argentina) Eduardo Schwank (Argentina) Horacio Zeballos	(United States) John Paul Fruttero (South Africa) Izak van der Merwe	3–6, 6–3, 12–10
2006	(Brazil) Marcelo Melo (Brazil) André Sá	(Sweden) Jacob Adaktusson (Argentina) Leonardo Mayer	7–6(1), 7–5
2005	(Denmark) Kristian Pless (Serbia and Montenegro) Alex Vlaški	(Brazil) Franco Ferreiro (Brazil) Marcelo Melo	7–6(5), 6–4
2004	(Brazil) Ricardo Mello (Peru) Iván Miranda	(Mexico) Alejandro Hernández (Brazil) André Sá	6–3, 6–4
2003	(South Africa) Rik de Voest (Ecuador) Giovanni Lapentti	(Argentina) Carlos Berlocq (Mexico) Miguel Gallardo Valles	6–1, 7–5
2002	(Mexico) Alejandro Hernández (Brazil) Daniel Melo	(Chinese Taipei) Lu Yen-hsun (Thailand) Danai Udomchoke	walkover
2001	(Australia) Dejan Petrovic (Israel) Andy Ram	(Brazil) Adriano Ferreira (Brazil) Daniel Melo	6–3, 6–4

=== Women's doubles ===
Year	Champions	Runners-up	Score
2017(2)	(Brazil) Gabriela Cé (Brazil) Thaisa Grana Pedretti	(Brazil) Nathaly Kurata (Brazil) Eduarda Piai	7–5, 6–4
2017(1)	(Brazil) Ingrid Martins (Paraguay) Camila Giangreco Campiz	(Brazil) Nathaly Kurata (Brazil) Rebeca Pereira	6–3, 7–6^{(7–1)}
2016	(Brazil) Ingrid Martins (Brazil) Laura Pigossi	(Brazil) Maria Fernanda Alves (Brazil) Luisa Stefani	6–3, 3–6, [10–8]
2015	Not held		
2014	(Brazil) Nathaly Kurata (Brazil) Giovanna Tomita	(Brazil) Carolina Alves (Brazil) Ingrid Martins	6–3, 6–2
2013	(Brazil) Paula Cristina Gonçalves (Argentina) María Irigoyen	(Bolivia) María Fernanda Álvarez Terán (Brazil) Maria Fernanda Alves	7–5, 6–3
2012	(Australia) Monique Adamczak (Brazil) Maria Fernanda Alves	(Brazil) Paula Cristina Gonçalves (Brazil) Roxane Vaisemberg	4–6, 6–3, [10–3]
2011	(Brazil) Fernanda Hermenegildo (Brazil) Teliana Pereira	(Brazil) Maria Fernanda Alves (Brazil) Roxane Vaisemberg	3–6, 7–6^{(7–5)}, [11–9]
2010	(Brazil) Fernanda Faria (Brazil) Paula Cristina Gonçalves	(Brazil) Monique Albuquerque (Brazil) Roxane Vaisemberg	6–3, 6–2
2009	Not held		
2008	(Argentina) Mailen Auroux (Brazil) Roxane Vaisemberg	(Argentina) Jorgelina Cravero (Argentina) María Irigoyen	6–3, 6–4
2007	(Brazil) Joana Cortez (Brazil) Roxane Vaisemberg	(Argentina) María José Argeri (Brazil) Letícia Sobral	7–5, 6–0
2006	(Argentina) María José Argeri (Brazil) Letícia Sobral	(Brazil) Carla Tiene (Brazil) Jenifer Widjaja	6–3, 6–3
2005	(Argentina) María José Argeri (Brazil) Letícia Sobral	(Brazil) Maria Fernanda Alves (Portugal) Frederica Piedade	6–0, 6–2
2004	(Hungary) Katalin Marosi / (Portugal) Frederica Piedade vs. (Brazil) Maria Fernanda Alves / (Brazil) Carla Tiene		not played
2003	(Brazil) Maria Fernanda Alves (Brazil) Carla Tiene	(Argentina) Melisa Arévalo (Portugal) Frederica Piedade	7–6^{(7–4)}, 6–2
2002	(Brazil) Bruna Colósio (Brazil) Carla Tiene	(Netherlands) Jolanda Mens (Netherlands) Andrea van den Hurk	6–1, 4–6, 6–4
