= Claudia Razzeto =

Peruvian tennis player (born 1991)

- Country (sports): Peru
- Born: 18 April 1991 (age 34) Lima, Peru
- Turned pro: 2006
- Retired: 2010
- Plays: Right (two-handed backhand)
- College: Loyola Marymount Lions
- Prize money: $12,509

Singles
- Career record: 43–43
- Career titles: 1 ITF
- Highest ranking: No. 560 (27 October 2008)

Doubles
- Career record: 41–27
- Career titles: 3 ITF
- Highest ranking: No. 527 (27 October 2008)

Team competitions
- Fed Cup: 2–2

Claudia Razzeto (born 18 April 1991) is a Peruvian former tennis player.

In her career, Razzeto won one singles title and three doubles titles on the ITF Circuit. On 27 October 2008, she achieved her career-high WTA singles ranking of 560. Her career-high in doubles is world No. 527, reached on 27 October 2008. She decided to follow the college route and was part of the Loyola Marymount Lions tennis team from 2010 to 2013.

Playing for Peru Fed Cup team, Razzeto has a win–loss record of 2–2.

== ITF finals ==
$10,000 tournaments

=== Singles: 1 (1 title) ===
Result	W–L	Date	Tournament	Tier	Surface	Opponent	Score
Win	1–0	Oct 2008	ITF Santa Cruz, Bolivia	10,000	Clay	(Chile) Gabriela Roux	6–0, 7–6^{(3)}

=== Doubles: 7 (3 titles, 4 runner–ups) ===
Result	W–L	Date	Tournament	Tier	Surface	Partnering	Opponents	Score
Loss	0–1	Sept 2007	ITF Santa Cruz, Bolivia	10,000	Clay	(Bolivia) María Fernanda Álvarez Terán	(Argentina) Soledad Esperón (Argentina) María Irigoyen	2–6, 2–6
Loss	0–2	Oct 2007	ITF Itu, Brazil	10,000	Clay	(Argentina) Lucía Jara Lozano	(Argentina) Mailen Auroux (Argentina) Tatiana Búa	2–6, 7–5, [8–10]
Win	1–2	Nov 2007	ITF Lima, Peru	10,000	Clay	(Bolivia) María Fernanda Álvarez Terán	(Brazil) Ana Clara Duarte (Venezuela) Mariana Muci	3–6, 7–6^{(7)}, [10–5]
Win	2–2	Apr 2008	ITF Villa Allende, Argentina	10,000	Clay	(Argentina) Aranza Salut	(Brazil) Marcela Guimarães Bueno (Argentina) Luciana Sarmenti	6–4, 7–5
Loss	2–3	Jul 2008	ITF Cartagena, Colombia	10,000	Hard	(United States) Nataly Yoo	(Colombia) Viky Núñez Fuentes (Colombia) Paula Catalina Robles Garcia	w/o
Loss	2–4	Oct 2008	ITF Santa Cruz, Bolivia	10,000	Clay	(Argentina) Paula Ormaechea	(Argentina) Rocio Galarza (Chile) Gabriela Roux	6–7^{(5)}, 6–3, [9–11]
Win	3–4	Oct 2009	ITF Santa Cruz, Bolivia	10,000	Clay	(Argentina) Lucía Jara Lozano	(Argentina) Amira Pirovani (Bolivia) Belén Rivera	7–5, 6–2
