= María Irigoyen =

Argentine tennis player

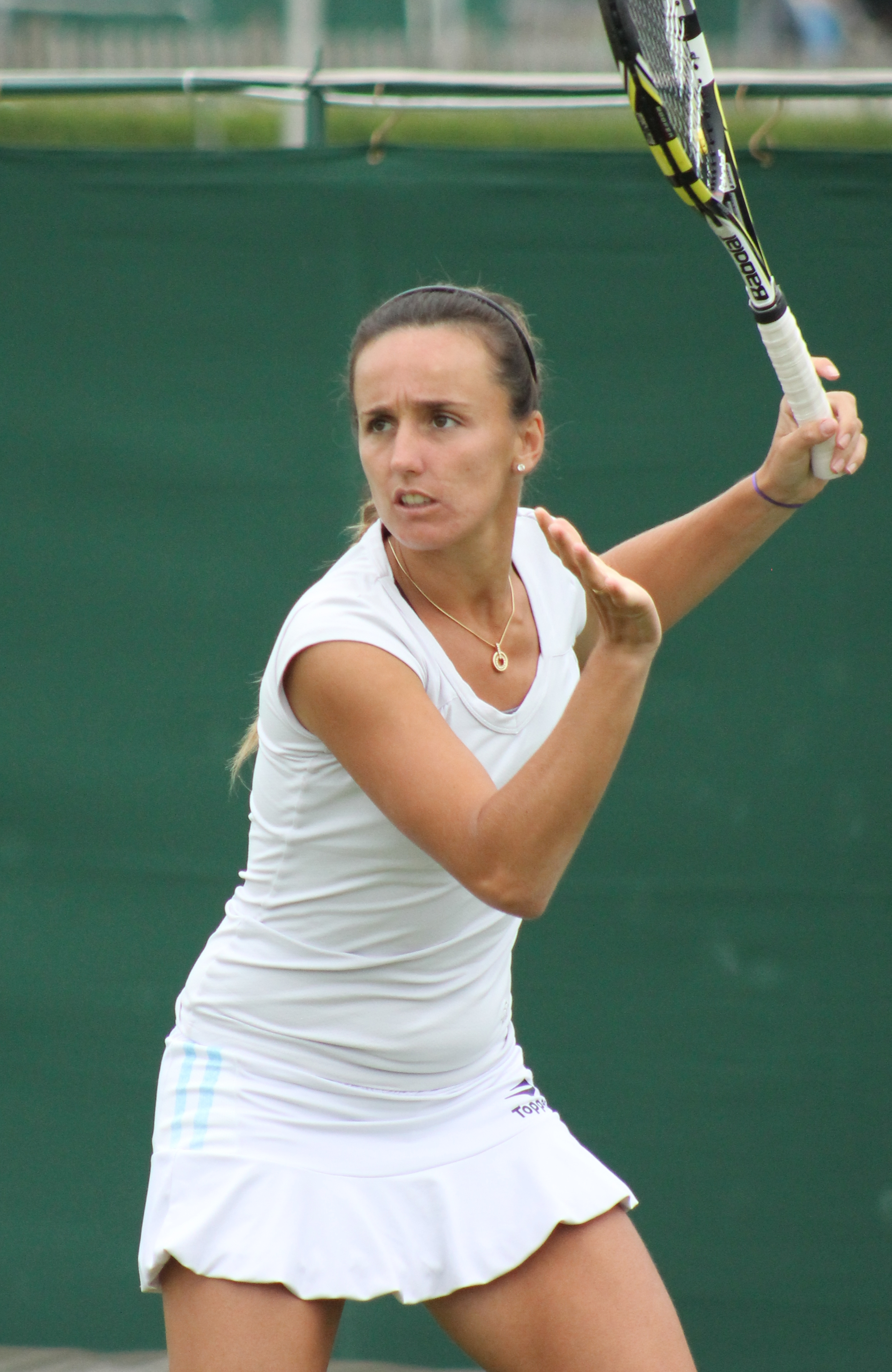
- Country (sports): Argentina
- Residence: Tandil, Argentina
- Born: 24 June 1987 (age 38); Tandil
- Height: 1.71 m (5 ft 7 in)
- Turned pro: 2005
- Retired: 2019
- Plays: Left-handed (two-handed backhand)
- Prize money: $552,147

Singles
- Career record: 426–293
- Career titles: 17 ITF
- Highest ranking: No. 147 (13 July 2015)

Grand Slam singles results
- Australian Open: Q1 (2011, 2013, 2014, 2015, 2016)
- French Open: Q1 (2011, 2013, 2014)
- Wimbledon: Q2 (2010)
- US Open: Q1 (2012, 2013)

Doubles
- Career record: 513–271
- Career titles: 2 WTA, 60 ITF
- Highest ranking: No. 47 (13 June 2016)

Grand Slam doubles results
- Australian Open: 1R (2015, 2016, 2017)
- French Open: 2R (2016)
- Wimbledon: 1R (2013, 2016, 2018)
- US Open: 2R (2016)

Grand Slam mixed doubles results
- Wimbledon: 1R 2018
Medal record
Representing Argentina
Women's tennis
Pan American Games
| Gold medal – first place | 2011 Guadalajara | Doubles |
| Gold medal – first place | 2015 Toronto | Mixed doubles |
| Bronze medal – third place | 2015 Toronto | Doubles |

María Irigoyen (born 24 June 1987) is an Argentine former tennis player.

On 13 July 2015, she reached her best singles ranking of world No. 147. On 13 June 2016, she peaked at No. 47 in the WTA doubles rankings.

In her career, Irigoyen won two doubles titles on the WTA Tour, as well as 17 singles and 60 doubles titles on the ITF Women's Circuit.

Playing for Argentina Fed Cup team since 2008, she has scored a win–loss record of 21–18.

== WTA Tour finals ==
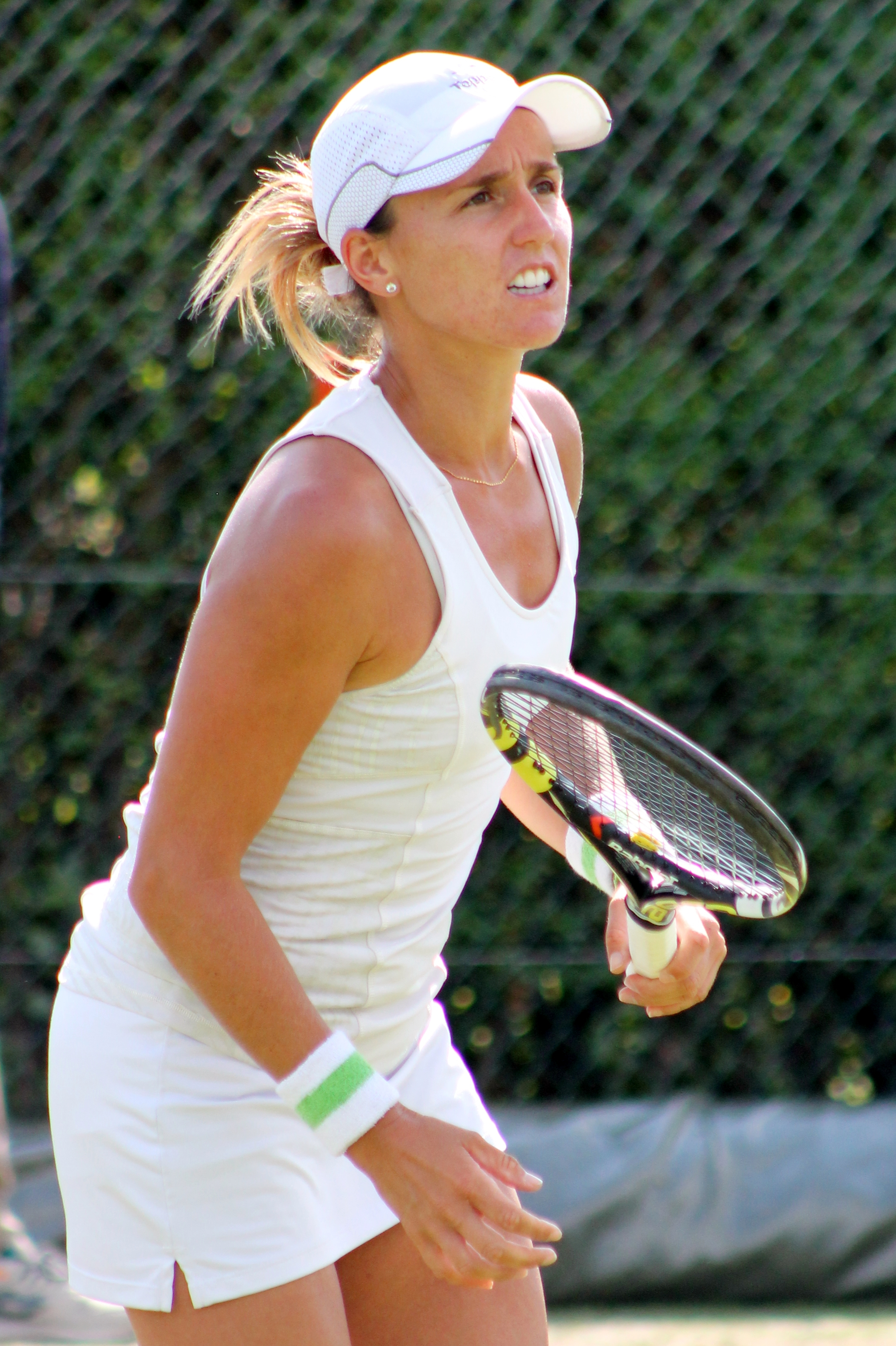
María Irigoyen, 2015

=== Doubles: 8 (2 titles, 6 runner-ups) ===
| Legend Grand Slam tournaments Premier M & Premier 5 Premier International (2–6) | Finals by surface Hard (0–1) Clay (2–5) Grass (0–0) Carpet (0–0) |

| Result | No. | Date | Tournament | Surface | Partner | Opponents | Score |
|---|---|---|---|---|---|---|---|
| Win | 1. | Feb 2014 | Rio Open, Brazil | Clay | (Romania) Irina-Camelia Begu | (Sweden) Johanna Larsson (South Africa) Chanelle Scheepers | 6–2, 6–0 |
| Loss | 1. | Feb 2015 | Rio Open, Brazil | Clay | (Romania) Irina-Camelia Begu | (Belgium) Ysaline Bonaventure (Sweden) Rebecca Peterson | 0–3 ret. |
| Loss | 2. | Jul 2015 | Brasil Tennis Cup | Clay | (Poland) Paula Kania | (Germany) Annika Beck (Germany) Laura Siegemund | 3–6, 6–7^{(1)} |
| Loss | 3. | Sep 2015 | Tournoi de Québec, Canada | Hard (i) | (Poland) Paula Kania | (Czech Republic) Barbora Krejčíková (Belgium) An-Sophie Mestach | 6–4, 3–6, [10–12] |
| Win | 2. | Feb 2016 | Rio Open, Brazil | Clay | (Paraguay) Verónica Cepede | (United Kingdom) Tara Moore (Switzerland) Conny Perrin | 6–1, 7–6^{(5)} |
| Loss | 4. | Apr 2016 | Prague Open, Czech Republic | Clay | (Poland) Paula Kania | (Russia) Margarita Gasparyan (Czech Republic) Andrea Hlaváčková | 4–6, 2–6 |
| Loss | 5. | May 2016 | Internationaux de Strasbourg, France | Clay | (China) Liang Chen | (Spain) Anabel Medina Garrigues (Spain) Arantxa Parra Santonja | 2–6, 0–6 |
| Loss | 6. | Jul 2017 | Båstad Open, Sweden | Clay | (Czech Republic) Barbora Krejčíková | (Netherlands) Quirine Lemoine (Netherlands) Arantxa Rus | 6–3, 3–6, [8–10] |

== ITF Circuit finals ==
=== Singles: 30 (17 titles, 13 runner-ups) ===
Legend
$100,000 tournaments
$75,000 tournaments
$50,000 tournaments
$25,000 tournaments
$10,000 tournaments

| Result | No. | Date | Tournament | Surface | Opponent | Score |
|---|---|---|---|---|---|---|
| Loss | 1. | Jun 2006 | ITF Xalapa, Mexico | Hard | (Chile) Andrea Koch Benvenuto | 1–6, 6–3, 4–6 |
| Loss | 2. | Jul 2006 | ITF Valencia, Venezuela | Hard | (Uruguay) Estefanía Craciún | 5–7, 1–6 |
| Win | 3. | Jun 2007 | ITF Bucharest, Romania | Clay | (Ukraine) Katerina Avdiyenko | 4–6, 6–1, 6–4 |
| Win | 4. | Aug 2007 | ITF Caracas, Venezuela | Hard | (Brazil) Ana Clara Duarte | 6–3, 6–3 |
| Win | 5. | Sep 2007 | ITF Santa Cruz de la Sierra, Bolivia | Clay | (Argentina) Verónica Spiegel | 6–3, 7–5 |
| Loss | 6. | Sep 2007 | ITF Santo Andre, Brazil | Hard | (Bolivia) María Fernanda Álvarez Terán | 2–6, 2–6 |
| Loss | 7. | Oct 2007 | ITF Monterrey, Mexico | Hard | (United States) Tetiana Luzhanska | 3–6, 2–6 |
| Win | 8. | Nov 2007 | ITF Buenos Aires, Argentina | Clay | (Argentina) Andrea Benítez | 6–1, 6–1 |
| Loss | 9. | Nov 2007 | ITF Buenos Aires | Clay | (Argentina) Agustina Lepore | 3–6, 6–4, 2–6 |
| Loss | 10. | Sep 2008 | ITF Buenos Aires | Clay | (Brazil) Roxane Vaisemberg | 2–6, 5–7 |
| Win | 11. | Mar 2009 | ITF Metepec, Mexico | Hard | (Argentina) Aranza Salut | 7–6^{(6)}, 6–1 |
| Win | 12. | Apr 2009 | ITF Buenos Aires | Clay | (Argentina) Mailen Auroux | 6–3, 6–4 |
| Loss | 13. | May 2009 | ITF Buenos Aires | Clay | (Argentina) Mailen Auroux | 2–6, 3–6 |
| Win | 14. | May 2009 | ITF Córdoba, Argentina | Clay | (Venezuela) Marina Giral Lores | 6–2, 7–6^{(6)} |
| Win | 15. | Jun 2009 | ITF Córdoba | Clay | (Argentina) Carla Lucero | 6–1, 6–0 |
| Win | 16. | Oc 2009 | ITF Granada, Spain | Hard | (Spain) Beatriz García Vidagany | 7–5, 2–6, 4–3 ret. |
| Win | 17. | Jun 2010 | ITF Campobasso, Italy | Clay | (France) Laura Thorpe | 6–2, 7–6^{(7)} |
| Win | 18. | Aug 2011 | ITF Santa Cruz de la Sierra | Clay | (Chile) Andrea Koch Benvenuto | 6–2, 6–3 |
| Loss | 19. | Aug 2011 | ITF La Paz, Bolivia | Clay | (Chile) Andrea Koch Benvenuto | 6–0, 7–6^{(7)} |
| Win | 20. | Aug 2011 | ITF São José dos Campos, Brazil | Clay | (Argentina) Carolina Zeballos | 6–0, 6–0 |
| Win | 21. | Aug 2011 | ITF São Paulo, Brazil | Clay | (Argentina) Carla Lucero | 6–2, 6–3 |
| Loss | 22. | Oct 2011 | ITF Asunción, Paraguay | Clay | (Slovakia) Romana Tabak | 5–7, 7–6^{(9)}, 7–5 |
| Win | 23. | Jul 2012 | ITF Campos do Jordão, Brazil | Hard | (Croatia) Donna Vekić | 7–5, 6–0 |
| Loss | 24. | Jul 2012 | ITF São José do Rio Preto, Brazil | Clay | (Argentina) Florencia Molinero | 6–3, 6–4 |
| Loss | 25. | Jul 2013 | ITF São José do Rio Preto | Clay | (Argentina) Florencia Molinero | 0–6, 6–2, 6–3 |
| Win | 26. | Jul 2013 | ITF Campinas, Brazil | Hard | (Paraguay) Verónica Cepede Royg | 6–2, 6–2 |
| Loss | 27. | Jul 2013 | ITF Campos do Jordão, Brazil | Hard | (Brazil) Paula Cristina Gonçalves | 3–6, 7–5, 6–1 |
| Loss | 28. | Dec 2013 | ITF Santiago, Chile | Clay | (Paraguay) Verónica Cepede Royg | 6–3, 6–4 |
| Win | 29. | Aug 2014 | ITF Caracas, Venezuela | Hard | (France) Harmony Tan | 6–1, 6–3 |
| Win | 30. | May 2015 | Nana Trophy, Tunisia | Clay | (Netherlands) Cindy Burger | 6–2, 7–5 |

=== Doubles: 99 (60 titles, 39 runner-ups) ===
| Result | No. | Date | Tournament | Surface | Partner | Opponents | Score |
|---|---|---|---|---|---|---|---|
| Loss | 1. | 22 August 2005 | ITF Bogotá, Colombia | Clay (i) | (Argentina) Luciana Sarmenti | (Ecuador) Estefania Balda Álvarez (Venezuela) Mariana Muci | 5–7, 3–6 |
| Win | 2. | 3 October 2005 | ITF Córdoba, Argentina | Clay | (Argentina) Luciana Sarmenti | (Brazil) Fernanda Hermenegildo (Paraguay) Sarah Tami Masi | 6–3, 3–6, 6–2 |
| Win | 3. | 23 October 2005 | ITF Asunción, Paraguay | Clay | (Colombia) Karen Castiblanco | (Argentina) Albertina Gandara (Argentina) Sheila Guerberg | 6–4, 6–4 |
| Win | 4. | 13 February 2006 | San Cristóbal, Mexico | Hard | (Argentina) Flavia Mignola | (Mexico) Erika Clarke (United States) Courtney Nagle | 2–1 ret. |
| Loss | 5. | 9 May 2006 | Los Mochis, Mexico | Clay | (Argentina) Agustina Lepore | (Colombia) Mariana Duque Mariño (Colombia) Viky Núñez Fuentes | 5–7, 3–6 |
| Win | 6. | 20 May 2006 | Obregón, Mexico | Clay | (Argentina) Agustina Lepore | (Mexico) Erika Clarke (United States) Courtney Nagle | 6–2, 6–1 |
| Loss | 7. | 5 June 2006 | Xalapa, Mexico | Hard | (Argentina) Flavia Mignola | (Argentina) Betina Jozami (Mexico) Daniela Múñoz Gallegos | 6–7^{(8)}, 6–3, 1–6 |
| Win | 8. | 26 June 2006 | Córdoba, Argentina | Clay | (Argentina) Flavia Mignola | (Chile) Melisa Miranda (Argentina) Luciana Sarmenti | 6–3, 6–4 |
| Loss | 9. | 10 July 2006 | Caracas, Venezuela | Hard | (Argentina) Flavia Mignola | (Argentina) Betina Jozami (Chile) Andrea Koch Benvenuto | 6–4, 2–6, 2–6 |
| Loss | 10. | 28 August 2006 | Bogotá, Colombia | Clay | (Argentina) Vanesa Furlanetto | (Colombia) Mariana Duque Marino (Colombia) Viky Núñez Fuentes | 4–6, 2–6 |
| Loss | 11. | 6 March 2007 | Toluca, Mexico | Hard (i) | (Argentina) Andrea Benítez | (United States) Courtney Nagle (South Africa) Chanelle Scheepers | 2–6, 6–1, 2–6 |
| Win | 12. | 30 April 2007 | Buenos Aires, Argentina | Clay | (Argentina) Andrea Benítez | (Brazil) Nicole Buitoni (Brazil) Fernanda Hermenegildo | 6–2, 6–2 |
| Win | 13. | 14 May 2007 | Córdoba, Argentina | Clay | (Argentina) Andrea Benítez | (Colombia) Karen Castiblanco (Chile) Melisa Miranda | 6–2, 6–4 |
| Win | 14. | 14 May 2007 | Córdoba, Argentina | Clay | (Argentina) Andrea Benítez | (Argentina) Soledad Esperón (Argentina) Agustina Lepore | 6–4, 2–6, 6–4 |
| Win | 15. | 10 June 2007 | Balș, Romania | Clay | (Romania) Raluca Ciulei | (Romania) Diana Enache (Romania) Antonia Xenia Tout | 6–3, 6–3 |
| Win | 16. | 2 July 2007 | Prokuplje, Serbia | Clay | (Montenegro) Ana Veselinović | (Netherlands) Kika Hogendoorn (Belgium) Davinia Lobbinger | 6–1, 7–6^{(3)} |
| Win | 17. | 13 July 2007 | Bucharest, Romania | Clay | (Argentina) Andrea Benítez | (Spain) Melissa Carbera Handt (Spain) Carolina Gago Fuentes | 7–6^{(10)}, 6–1 |
| Win | 18. | 20 July 2007 | Craiova, Romania | Clay | (Argentina) Andrea Benítez | (Argentina) Mailen Auroux (Argentina) Vanesa Furlanetto | 6–3, 6–4 |
| Win | 19. | 27 August 2007 | Santa Cruz de la Sierra, Bolivia | Clay | (Argentina) Soledad Esperón | (Bolivia) María Fernanda Álvarez Terán (Peru) Claudia Razzeto | 6–2, 6–2 |
| Loss | 20. | 3 September 2007 | Barueri, Brazil | Hard | (Argentina) Soledad Esperón | (Brazil) Fabiana Chiaparini (Brazil) Letícia Sobral | 7–6^{(4)}, 4–6, [9–11] |
| Win | 21. | 10 September 2007 | Santo Andre, Brazil | Hard | (Argentina) Soledad Esperón | (Brazil) Larissa Carvalho (Brazil) Carla Tiene | 4–6, 6–2, [10–7] |
| Loss | 22. | 29 September 2007 | ITF Juárez, Mexico | Clay | (Brazil) Roxane Vaisemberg | (Argentina) Andrea Benítez (Argentina) Soledad Esperón | 3–6, 4–6 |
| Win | 23. | 7 April 2008 | Jackson, United States | Clay | (Argentina) Soledad Esperón | (United States) Christina Fusano (Czech Republic) Michaela Paštiková | 1–6, 6–3, [10–6] |
| Loss | 24. | 28 April 2008 | Coatzacoalcos, Mexico | Hard | (Argentina) Agustina Lepore | (United Kingdom) Anna Fitzpatrick (United Kingdom) Anna Hawkins | 2–6, 2–6 |
| Loss | 25. | 26 May 2008 | Galatina, Italy | Clay | (Brazil) Maria Fernanda Alves | (Austria) Melanie Klaffner (Australia) Jessica Moore | 6–3, 1–6, [6–10] |
| Win | 26. | 9 June 2008 | Campobasso, Italy | Clay | (Brazil) Roxane Vaisemberg | (Italy) Nicole Clerico (Australia) Jessica Moore | 6–3, 6–2 |
| Loss | 27. | 28 July 2008 | Campos do Jordão, Brazil | Clay | (Argentina) Jorgelina Cravero | (Argentina) Mailen Auroux (Brazil) Roxane Vaisemberg | 3–6, 4–6 |
| Win | 28. | 1 September 2008 | Buenos Aires, Argentina | Clay | (Uruguay) Estefanía Craciún | (Argentina) Mailen Auroux (Brazil) Roxane Vaisemberg | 1–6, 6–1, [10–2] |
| Win | 29. | 20 October 2008 | Mexico City, Mexico | Hard | (Uruguay) Estefanía Craciún | (Mexico) Lorena Arias (Mexico) Angélica Chávez | 6–3, 6–4 |
| Win | 30. | 27 October 2008 | ITF Mexico City | Hard | (Uruguay) Estefanía Craciún | (United States) Sabrina Capannolo (Slovakia) Dominika Diešková | 6–4, 6–4 |
| Loss | 31. | 24 November 2008 | ITF Buenos Aires | Clay | (Argentina) Tatiana Búa | (Brazil) Fernanda Hermenegildo (Brazil) Teliana Pereira | 3–6, 2–6 |
| Win | 32. | 6 December 2008 | ITF Buenos Aires | Clay | (Argentina) Carla Beltrami | (Chile) Catalia Arancibia (Paraguay) Isabella Robbiani | 6–0, 6–2 |
| Win | 33. | 4 April 2009 | ITF Lima, Peru | Clay | (Argentina) Carla Beltrami | (Peru) Bianca Botto (Brazil) Natalia Guitler | 4–6, 6–3, [10–5] |
| Loss | 34. | 23 May 2009 | ITF Santos, Brazil | Clay | (Bolivia) María Fernanda Álvarez Terán | (Australia) Monique Adamczak (Argentina) Florencia Molinero | 6–1, 1–6, [7–10] |
| Win | 35. | 30 May 2009 | ITF Córdoba, Argentina | Clay | (Argentina) Carla Beltrami | (Brazil) Fernanda Hermenegildo (Brazil) Carla Tiene | 6–3, 6–4 |
| Loss | 36. | 22 June 2009 | ITF Périgueux, France | Clay | (Argentina) Jorgelina Cravero | (Ukraine) Yuliya Beygelzimer (Russia) Ksenia Lykina | 6–2, 2–6, [5–10] |
| Win | 37. | 5 July 2009 | ITF Mont-de-Marsan, France | Clay | (Argentina) Jorgelina Cravero | (Russia) Maria Kondratieva (France) Sophie Lefèvre | 2–6, 6–4, [10–7] |
| Win | 38. | 11 July 2009 | ITF La Coruña, Spain | Hard | (Argentina) Florencia Molinero | (Serbia) Vesna Dolonc (Belarus) Ksenia Milevskaya | 6–2, 6–4 |
| Win | 39. | 17 July 2009 | ITF Rome, Italy | Clay | (Serbia) Teodora Mirčić | (Italy) Elisa Balsamo (Italy) Stefania Chieppa | 7–5, 6–2 |
| Loss | 40. | 19 September 2009 | ITF Napoli, Italy | Clay | (Argentina) Betina Jozami | (Russia) Nina Bratchikova (Georgia (country)) Oksana Kalashnikova | 6–7^{(5)}, 6–2, [8–10] |
| Loss | 41. | 16 January 2010 | ITF Plantation, United States | Clay | (Argentina) Jorgelina Cravero | (France) Aurélie Védy (United States) Mashona Washington | 0–6, 2–6 |
| Win | 42. | 20 March 2010 | ITF Irapuato, Mexico | Hard | (Argentina) Florencia Molinero | (United States) Lena Litvak (Russia) Natalia Ryzhonkova | 6–7^{(3)}, 6–2, [10–7] |
| Loss | 43. | 10 April 2010 | ITF Jackson, United States | Clay | (Argentina) Florencia Molinero | (Brazil) Maria Fernanda Alves (Brazil) Ana Clara Duarte | 4–6, 6–3, [5–10] |
| Win | 44. | 18 April 2010 | ITF Osprey, United States | Clay | (Argentina) Florencia Molinero | (United States) Madison Brengle (United States) Asia Muhammad | 6–1, 7–6^{(3)} |
| Loss | 45. | 25 April 2010 | Dothan Classic, United States | Clay | (Serbia) Teodora Mirčić | (Russia) Alina Jidkova (Belarus) Anastasiya Yakimova | 4–6, 2–6 |
| Loss | 46. | 11 June 2010 | ITF Campobasso, Italy | Clay | (France) Laura Thorpe | (Ukraine) Yuliana Fedak (Ukraine) Anastasiya Vasylyeva | 6–2, 3–6, [6–10] |
| Loss | 47. | 26 July 2010 | Open Romania Ladies | Clay | (Argentina) Florencia Molinero | (Romania) Irina-Camelia Begu (Romania) Elena Bogdan | 1–6, 1–6 |
| Win | 48. | 20 September 2010 | ITF Foggia, Italy | Clay | (Argentina) Florencia Molinero | (Spain) Estrella Cabeza Candela (Spain) Laura Pous Tió | 6–2, 6–2 |
| Loss | 49. | 25 October 2010 | ITF Bayamón, Puerto Rico | Hard | (Argentina) Florencia Molinero | (Brazil) Maria Fernanda Alves (Canada) Marie-Ève Pelletier | 6–7, 4–6 |
| Loss | 50. | 3 April 2011 | ITF Buenos Aires, Argentina | Clay | (Argentina) Florencia Molinero | (Bolivia) María Fernanda Álvarez Terán (Argentina) Paula Ormaechea | 6–4, 5–7, [4–10] |
| Loss | 51. | 17 April 2011 | ITF Osprey, United States | Clay | (Japan) Erika Sema | (France) Stéphanie Foretz (United States) Alexa Glatch | 6–4, 5–7, [7–10] |
| Loss | 52. | 15 May 2011 | ITF Reggio Emilia, Italy | Clay | (Italy) Claudia Giovine | (Australia) Sally Peers (Australia) Sophie Ferguson | 4–6, 1–6 |
| Win | 53. | 29 May 2011 | Grado Tennis Cup, Italy | Clay | (Russia) Ekaterina Lopes | (China) Liu Wanting (China) Sun Shengnan | 6–3, 6–0 |
| Win | 54. | 12 June 2011 | ITF Campobasso, Italy | Clay | (Argentina) Mailen Auroux | (Croatia) Ani Mijacika (France) Irena Pavlovic | 6–2, 3–6, [13–11] |
| Win | 55. | 14 August 2011 | ITF Santa Cruz de la Sierra, Bolivia | Clay | (Chile) Andrea Koch Benvenuto | (Paraguay) Jazmín Britos (Paraguay) Giovanna Tomita | 6–2, 6–1 |
| Win | 56. | 21 August 2011 | ITF La Paz, Bolivia | Clay | (Chile) Andrea Koch Benvenuto | (Argentina) Carla Lucero (Argentina) Luciana Sarmenti | 6–2, 6–2 |
| Win | 57. | 28 August 2011 | ITF Cochabamba, Bolivia | Clay | (Argentina) Carla Lucero | (Slovakia) Lenka Broosová (Romania) Daiana Negreanu | 6–2, 6–3 |
| Loss | 58. | 18 September 2011 | ITF São José dos Campos, Brazil | Clay | (Argentina) Carla Lucero | (Brazil) Flávia Dechandt Araújo (Brazil) Laura Pigossi | 6–3, 5–7, [8–10] |
| Win | 59. | 25 September 2011 | ITF São Paulo, Brazil | Clay | (Argentina) Carla Lucero | (Brazil) Gabriela Cé (Brazil) Flávia Guimarães Bueno | 7–6^{(10)}, 6–4 |
| Win | 60. | 6 November 2011 | ITF Asunción, Paraguay | Clay | (Argentina) Mailen Auroux | (Argentina) Tatiana Búa (Argentina) Luciana Sarmenti | 6–3, 4–6, [10–5] |
| Win | 61. | 13 November 2011 | ITF Asunción | Clay | (Argentina) Mailen Auroux | (Norway) Ulrikke Eikeri (Venezuela) Andrea Gámiz | 6–1, 2–6, [10–5] |
| Loss | 62. | 20 November 2011 | ITF Asunción | Clay | (Argentina) Mailen Auroux | (United States) Julia Cohen (Croatia) Tereza Mrdeža | 3–6, 6–2, [5–10] |
| Win | 63. | 4 December 2011 | ITF Rosario, Argentina | Clay | (Argentina) Mailen Auroux | (Spain) Inés Ferrer Suárez (Netherlands) Richèl Hogenkamp | 4–6, 6–1, [10–7] |
| Win | 64. | 11 December 2011 | ITF Buenos Aires, Argentina | Clay | (Argentina) Mailen Auroux | (Brazil) Teliana Pereira (Brazil) Vivian Segnini | 6–1, 6–3 |
| Loss | 65. | 18 December 2011 | ITF Santiago, Chile | Clay | (Argentina) Mailen Auroux | (Spain) Inés Ferrer Suárez (Netherlands) Richèl Hogenkamp | 4–6, 6–3, [5–10] |
| Win | 66. | 12 February 2012 | ITF Bertioga, Brazil | Hard | (Argentina) Mailen Auroux | (Paraguay) Verónica Cepede Royg (Argentina) Florencia Molinero | 6–3, 6–1 |
| Loss | 67. | 8 April 2012 | ITF Jackson, United States | Clay | (Argentina) Mailen Auroux | (Russia) Elena Bovina (Croatia) Tereza Mrdeža | 3–6, 3–6 |
| Win | 68. | 29 April 2012 | ITF Caracas, Venezuela | Hard | (Argentina) Mailen Auroux | (Paraguay) Verónica Cepede Royg (Venezuela) Adriana Pérez | 6–4, 6–3 |
| Loss | 69. | 24 June 2012 | Open de Montpellier, France | Clay | (Argentina) Mailen Auroux | (France) Séverine Beltrame (France) Laura Thorpe | 6–4, 4–6, [6–10] |
| Win | 70. | 30 June 2012 | ITF Périgueux, France | Clay | (Argentina) Mailen Auroux | (Paraguay) Leticia Costas (Spain) Inés Ferrer Suárez | 6–1, 6–2 |
| Win | 71. | 8 July 2012 | Reinert Open, Germany | Clay | (Argentina) Mailen Auroux | (Romania) Elena Bogdan (Hungary) Réka Luca Jani | 6–1, 6–4 |
| Win | 72. | 29 July 2012 | ITF Sao Jose Do Rio Preto, Brazil | Clay | (Argentina) Mailen Auroux | (Argentina) Aranza Salut (Argentina) Carolina Zeballos | 6–1, 7–6^{(1)} |
| Win | 73. | 9 September 2012 | Save Cup, Italy | Clay | (Argentina) Mailen Auroux | (Hungary) Réka Luca Jani (Serbia) Teodora Mirčić | 5–7, 6–4, [10–8] |
| Loss | 74. | 23 September 2012 | Royal Cup, Montenegro | Clay | (Argentina) Mailen Auroux | (Italy) Nicole Clerico (Germany) Anna Zaja | 6–4, 3–6, [9–11] |
| Win | 75. | 2 December 2012 | ITF Santiago, Chile | Clay | (Argentina) Mailen Auroux | (Brazil) Paula Cristina Gonçalves (Brazil) Roxane Vaisemberg | 6–4, 6–2 |
| Loss | 76. | 24 March 2013 | ITF Innisbrook, United States | Clay | (Brazil) Paula Cristina Gonçalves | (Australia) Ashleigh Barty (France) Alizé Lim | 1–6, 3–6 |
| Loss | 77. | 2 June 2013 | Maribor Open, Slovenia | Clay | (Argentina) Mailen Auroux | (Poland) Paula Kania (Poland) Magda Linette | 3–6, 0–6 |
| Win | 78. | 21 July 2013 | ITF Campos do Jordão, Brazil | Hard | (Brazil) Paula Cristina Gonçalves | (Bolivia) María Fernanda Álvarez Terán (Brazil) Maria Fernanda Alves | 7–5, 6–3 |
| Win | 79. | 5 October 2013 | ITF Victoria, Mexico | Hard | (Bolivia) María Fernanda Álvarez Terán | (United States) Hsu Chieh-yu (Mexico) Ana Sofía Sánchez | 7–6^{(2)}, 6–3 |
| Win | 80. | 13 October 2013 | ITF Tampico, Mexico | Hard | (Bolivia) María Fernanda Álvarez Terán | (Mexico) Constanza Gorches (Mexico) Victoria Rodríguez | 6–3, 6–4 |
| Win | 81. | 20 October 2013 | ITF Rock Hill, United States | Hard | (Colombia) Mariana Duque Mariño | (United States) Allie Kiick (United States) Asia Muhammad | 4–6, 7–6^{(5)}, [12–10] |
| Win | 82. | 7 December 2013 | ITF Mérida, Mexico | Hard | (United States) Hsu Chieh-yu | (Sweden) Hilda Melander (Sweden) Rebecca Peterson | 6–4, 5–7, [10–6] |
| Win | 83. | 13 December 2013 | ITF Santiago, Chile | Clay | (Paraguay) Verónica Cepede Royg | (Chile) Cecilia Costa Melgar (Chile) Daniela Seguel | 2–6, 6–4, [10–5] |
| Loss | 84. | 20 December 2013 | ITF Bertioga, Brazil | Hard | (Paraguay) Verónica Cepede Royg | (Brazil) Paula Cristina Gonçalves (Brazil) Laura Pigossi | 6–2, 4–6, [7–10] |
| Loss | 85. | 15 March 2014 | ITF São Paulo, Brazil | Clay | (Bolivia) María Fernanda Álvarez Terán | (Romania) Irina-Camelia Begu (Russia) Alexandra Panova | 4–6, 6–3, [9–11] |
| Win | 86. | 5 April 2014 | Open Medellín, Colombia | Clay | (Romania) Irina-Camelia Begu | (Australia) Monique Adamczak (Russia) Marina Shamayko | 6–2, 7–6^{(2)} |
| Win | 87. | 17 May 2014 | Open Saint-Gaudens, France | Clay | (Paraguay) Verónica Cepede Royg | (Canada) Sharon Fichman (United Kingdom) Johanna Konta | 7–5, 6–3 |
| Loss | 88. | 5 July 2014 | Lorraine Open 88, France | Clay | (Romania) Irina-Camelia Begu | (Russia) Alexandra Panova (France) Laura Thorpe | 3–6, 0–4 ret. |
| Win | 89. | 28 September 2014 | Las Vegas Open, United States | Hard | (Paraguay) Verónica Cepede Royg | (United States) Asia Muhammad (United States) Maria Sanchez | 6–3, 5–7, [11–9] |
| Loss | 90. | 28 March 2015 | ITF Innisbrook, United States | Clay | (Argentina) Paula Ormaechea | (Czech Republic) Petra Krejsová (Brazil) Paula Cristina Gonçalves | 2–6, 4–6 |
| Loss | 91. | 5 April 2015 | ITF Osprey, United States | Clay | (Paraguay) Verónica Cepede Royg | (Ukraine) Anhelina Kalinina (Ukraine) Oleksandra Korashvili | 1–6, 4–6 |
| Win | 92. | 10 May 2015 | Nana Trophy, Tunisia | Clay | (Poland) Paula Kania | (France) Julie Coin (France) Stéphanie Foretz | 6–1, 6–3 |
| Loss | 93. | 5 June 2015 | Internazionali di Brescia, Italy | Clay | (Liechtenstein) Stephanie Vogt | (Germany) Laura Siegemund (Czech Republic) Renata Voráčová | 2–6, 1–6 |
| Win | 94. | 12 June 2015 | ITF Padua, Italy | Clay | (Czech Republic) Barbora Krejčíková | (Hungary) Réka Luca Jani (Argentina) Paula Ormaechea | 6–4, 6–2 |
| Win | 95. | 20 June 2015 | Open Montpellier, France | Clay | (Czech Republic) Barbora Krejčíková | (Germany) Laura Siegemund (Czech Republic) Renata Voráčová | 6–4, 6–2 |
| Loss | 96. | 3 October 2015 | ITF Victoria, Mexico | Hard | (Czech Republic) Barbora Krejčíková | (Belgium) Ysaline Bonaventure (Belgium) Elise Mertens | 4–6, 6–4, [6–10] |
| Win | 97. | 10 October 2015 | Abierto Tampico, Mexico | Hard | (Czech Republic) Barbora Krejčíková | (Paraguay) Verónica Cepede Royg (Russia) Marina Melnikova | 7–5, 6–2 |
| Win | 98. | 16 July 2017 | Budapest Ladies Open, Hungary | Clay | (Colombia) Mariana Duque Mariño | (Serbia) Aleksandra Krunić (Serbia) Nina Stojanović | 7–6^{(3)}, 7–5 |
| Win | 99. | 23 September 2017 | Abierto Tampico, Mexico | Hard | (United States) Caroline Dolehide | (United States) Kaitlyn Christian (Mexico) Giuliana Olmos | 6–4, 6–4 |
