= Aranza Salut =

Argentine tennis player

- Country (sports): Argentina
- Residence: Buenos Aires, Argentina
- Born: 12 July 1991 (age 34) Rosario, Argentina
- Height: 1.70 m (5 ft 7 in)
- Plays: Right-handed (two-handed backhand)
- Prize money: $58,643

Singles
- Career record: 187–120
- Career titles: 5 ITF
- Highest ranking: No. 306 (9 August 2010)

Doubles
- Career record: 139–90
- Career titles: 7 ITF
- Highest ranking: No. 288 (21 May 2012)

Aranza Salut (born 12 July 1991) is a former professional Argentine tennis player.

On 9 August 2010, she reached her career-high WTA singles ranking of 306. On 21 May 2012, she peaked at No. 288 in the WTA doubles rankings. She started playing tennis at the age of seven.

== ITF Circuit finals ==
$25,000 tournaments
$10,000 tournaments

=== Singles: 12 (5 titles, 7 runner-ups) ===
Result	No.	Date	Tournament	Surface	Opponent	Score
Win	1.	19 April 2008	ITF Villa Allende, Argentina	Clay	(Brazil) Nathália Rossi	6–2, 6–4
Loss	2.	3 May 2008	ITF Bell Ville, Argentina	Clay	(Hungary) Katalin Marosi	2–6, 2–6
Win	3.	28 September 2008	ITF Serra Negra, Brazil	Clay	(Peru) Bianca Botto	6–4, 6–4
Win	4.	12 October 2008	ITF Mogi das Cruzes, Brazil	Clay	(Brazil) Fernanda Hermenegildo	7–6^{(7–3)}, 6–1
Loss	5.	23 November 2008	ITF Montevideo, Uruguay	Clay	(Uruguay) Estefanía Craciún	4–6, 6–3, 2–6
Loss	6.	29 March 2009	ITF Metepec, Mexico	Hard	(Argentina) María Irigoyen	6–7^{(6–8)}, 1–6
Loss	7.	24 May 2009	ITF Santos, Brazil	Clay	(Australia) Monique Adamczak	2–6, 1–6
Win	8.	1 August 2010	ITF Campos do Jordão, Brazil	Hard	(Bolivia) María Fernanda Álvarez Terán	2–6, 7–5, 6–3
Loss	9.	9 May 2011	ITF Itaparica Island, Brazil	Hard	(Argentina) Andrea Benítez	2–6, 3–6
Loss	10.	13 June 2011	ITF Santa Fe, Argentina	Clay	(Argentina) Vanesa Furlanetto	5–7, 3–6
Loss	11.	5 July 2011	ITF Valladolid, Spain	Hard	(France) Victoria Larrière	2–6, 6–7^{(6–8)}
Win	12.	6 August 2012	ITF Arequipa, Peru	Hard	(Argentina) Luciana Sarmenti	7–6^{(9–7)}, 4–6, 6–1

=== Doubles: 26 (7 titles, 19 runner-ups) ===
Result	No.	Date	Tournament	Surface	Partner	Opponents	Score
Win	1.	18 April 2008	ITF Villa Allende, Argentina	Clay	(Peru) Claudia Razzeto	(Brazil) Marcela Guimarães Bueno (Argentina) Luciana Sarmenti	6–4, 7–5
Loss	2.	23 August 2008	ITF Bell Ville, Argentina	Clay	(Argentina) Vanesa Furlanetto	(Argentina) Carla Beltrami (Argentina) Tatiana Búa	w/o
Win	3.	4 October 2008	ITF Curitiba, Brazil	Clay	(Colombia) Karen Castiblanco	(Brazil) Gisele Miró (Brazil) Isabela Miró	1–6, 6–2, [10–8]
Win	4.	12 October 2008	ITF Mogi das Cruzes, Brazil	Clay	(Colombia) Karen Castiblanco	(Brazil) Monique Albuquerque (Brazil) Paula Cristina Gonçalves	6–3, 6–1
Loss	5.	15 August 2009	ITF Buenos Aires, Argentina	Clay	(Argentina) Carla Beltrami	(Argentina) Luciana Sarmenti (Argentina) Emilia Yorio	3–6, 3–6
Loss	6.	7 November 2009	ITF Buenos Aires	Clay	(Brazil) Ana Clara Duarte	(Argentina) Luciana Sarmenti (Argentina) Emilia Yorio	2–6, 2–6
Loss	6.	4 September 2010	ITF Santa Fe, Argentina	Clay	(Argentina) Tatiana Búa	(Colombia) Karen Castiblanco (Chile) Camila Silva	6–4, 3–6, [6–10]
Loss	7	22 November 2010	ITF Barueri, Brazil	Clay	(Bolivia) María Fernanda Álvarez Terán	(Brazil) Fernanda Faria (Brazil) Paula Cristina Gonçalves	5–7, 6–4, 5–7
Loss	8.	18 April 2011	ITF Córdoba, Argentina	Clay	(Argentina) Sofía Luini	(Paraguay) Verónica Cepede Royg (Argentina) Luciana Sarmenti	2–6, 0–6
Win	9.	27 May 2011	ITF Itaparica, Brazil	Clay	(Brazil) Monique Albuquerque	(Brazil) Roxane Vaisemberg (Brazil) Vivian Segnini	6–3, 4–6, [11–9]
Loss	10.	5 July 2011	ITF Valladolid, Spain	Hard	(Argentina) Vanesa Furlanetto	(France) Victoria Larrière (Denmark) Malou Ejdesgaard	0–6, 3–6
Loss	11.	25 July 2011	ITF Vigo, Spain	Hard	(Argentina) Vanesa Furlanetto	(Germany) Justine Ozga (Italy) Claudia Giovine	1–6, 3–6
Loss	12.	3 October 2011	ITF Madrid, Spain	Hard	(Argentina) Vanesa Furlanetto	(Germany) Kim Grajdek (Poland) Justyna Jegiołka	3–6, 3–6
Win	13.	9 April 2012	ITF Villa del Dique, Argentina	Clay	(Argentina) Vanesa Furlanetto	(Bolivia) María Fernanda Álvarez Terán (Argentina) Ornella Caron	w/o
Loss	14.	23 July 2012	ITF Sao Jose Do Rio Preto, Brazil	Clay	(Argentina) Carolina Zeballos	(Argentina) Mailen Auroux (Argentina) María Irigoyen	1–6, 6–7^{(1–7)}
Loss	15.	30 July 2012	ITF São Paulo, Brazil	Hard	(Argentina) Carolina Zeballos	(Brazil) Paula Cristina Gonçalves (Brazil) Roxane Vaisemberg	2–6, 2–6
Win	16.	18 August 2012	ITF Trujillo, Peru	Clay	(Mexico) Ana Sofía Sánchez	(Peru) Patricia Kú Flores (Peru) Katherine Miranda Chang	3–6, 6–1, [11–9]
Loss	17.	25 August 2012	ITF Lima, Peru	Clay	(Mexico) Ana Sofía Sánchez	(Brazil) Eduarda Piai (Brazil) Karina Venditti	4–6, 6–3, [8–10]
Loss	18.	8 September 2012	ITF Buenos Aires	Clay	(Mexico) Ana Sofía Sánchez	(Argentina) Andrea Benítez (Chile) Camila Silva	3–6, 0–6
Win	19.	15 October 2012	ITF Santiago, Chile	Clay	(Argentina) Carolina Zeballos	(Chile) Daniela Seguel (Chile) Cecilia Costa Melgar	4–6, 6–4, [10–8]
Loss	20.	22 October 2012	ITF Santiago	Clay	(Argentina) Ornella Caron	(Chile) Daniela Seguel (Chile) Cecilia Costa Melgar	3–6, 4–6
Loss	21.	29 April 2013	ITF Villa Allende	Clay	(Argentina) Victoria Bosio	(Paraguay) Sara Giménez (Paraguay) Montserrat González	4–6, 0–6
Loss	22.	6 May 2013	ITF Villa María, Argentina	Clay	(Argentina) Victoria Bosio	(Mexico) Ana Sofía Sánchez (Chile) Camila Silva	1–6, 2–6
Loss	23.	2 June 2013	ITF Cantanhede, Portugal	Carpet	(Argentina) Carolina Zeballos	(Poland) Agata Baranska (Poland) Zuzanna Maciejewska	7–6^{(7–4)}, 4–6, [10–12]
Loss	24.	8 June 2013	ITF Amarante, Portugal	Hard	(Argentina) Carolina Zeballos	(Switzerland) Tess Sugnaux (Portugal) Rita Vilaça	5–7, 5–7
Loss	25.	17 March 2014	ITF Lima, Peru	Clay	(Argentina) Sofía Luini	(Serbia) Tamara Čurović (Russia) Yana Sizikova	4–6, 5–7
Loss	26.	24 March 2014	ITF Lima	Clay	(Argentina) Sofía Luini	(Serbia) Tamara Čurović (Russia) Yana Sizikova	2–6, 6–7^{(2–7)}
