= Ana Clara Duarte =

Brazilian tennis player (born 1989)

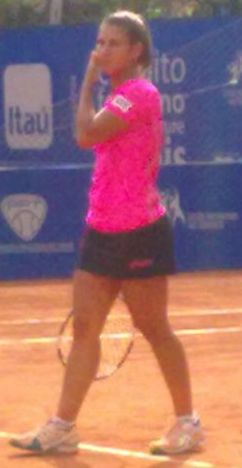
- Full name: Ana Clara Reis Duarte
- Country (sports): Brazil
- Born: 11 June 1989 (age 36) Rio de Janeiro, Brazil
- Height: 1.63 m (5 ft 4 in)
- Prize money: $96,178

Singles
- Career record: 222–167
- Career titles: 6 ITF
- Highest ranking: No. 221 (6 June 2011)

Doubles
- Career record: 177–121
- Career titles: 15 ITF
- Highest ranking: No. 182 (10 October 2011)

Team competitions
- Fed Cup: 8–5
Medal record
Representing BRA
Pan American Games
Bronze medal – third place	2011 Guadalajara	Mixed doubles

Ana Clara Reis Duarte (born 11 June 1989) is a Brazilian former tennis player. She won the bronze medal in mixed-doubles tournament at the 2011 Pan American Games.

Duarte won six singles and 15 doubles titles at tournaments of the ITF Circuit in her career. On 6 June 2011, she reached her best singles ranking of world No. 221. On 10 October 2011, she peaked at No. 182 in the doubles rankings.

== ITF Circuit finals ==
Legend
$25,000 tournaments
$15,000 tournaments
$10,000 tournaments

=== Singles: 20 (6 titles, 14 runner-ups) ===
Result	No.	Date	Tournament	Surface	Opponent	Score
Win	1.	Mar 2007	ITF Benin City, Nigeria	Hard	(Brazil) Nathalia Rossi	6–4, 6–7^{(8)}, 7–5
Loss	2.	Mar 2007	ITF Benin City	Hard	(Belgium) Debbrich Feys	7–6^{(6)}, 4–6, 4–6
Loss	3.	Aug 2007	ITF Caracas, Venezuela	Hard	(Argentina) María Irigoyen	3–6, 3–6
Loss	4.	Oct 2008	ITF Valencia, Venezuela	Hard	(United States) Katie Ruckert	2–6, 1–6
Loss	5.	Nov 2008	ITF Valencia, Venezuela	Hard	(United States) Katie Ruckert	6–7^{(5)}, 3–6
Win	6.	Dec 2008	ITF Havana, Cuba	Hard	(Belgium) Davinia Lobbinger	6–3, 6–2
Loss	7.	Dec 2008	ITF Havana	Hard	(Chile) Melisa Miranda	0–6, 4–6
Loss	8.	Apr 2009	ITF Buenos Aires, Argentina	Clay	(Argentina) Verónica Spiegel	5–7, 1–6
Loss	9.	Jun 2009	ITF Managua, Nicaragua	Hard	(Russia) Yana Koroleva	6–7^{(5)}, 6–1, 5–7
Loss	10.	Nov 2009	ITF Itajai, Brazil	Clay	(Argentina) Tatiana Búa	1–6, 5–7
Win	11.	Dec 2009	ITF Santiago, Chile	Clay	(Argentina) Carla Lucero	6–2, 6–0
Loss	12.	Jul 2010	ITF Brasília, Brazil	Hard	(Argentina) Paula Ormaechea	6–3, 6–7^{(1)}, 6–7^{(6)}
Loss	13.	Aug 2010	ITF Itaparica, Brazil	Hard	(Brazil) Roxane Vaisemberg	6–7^{(8)}, 3–6
Win	14.	Sep 2010	ITF Cairns, Australia	Hard	(Thailand) Noppawan Lertcheewakarn	6–3, 3–6, 6–2
Loss	15.	Sep 2010	ITF Alice Springs, Australia	Hard	(New Zealand) Sacha Jones	7–5, 3–6, 3–6
Loss	16.	Oct 2010	ITF Mount Gambier, Australia	Hard	(Japan) Erika Sema	2–6, 3–6
Win	17.	Jun 2012	ITF Santos, Brazil	Clay	(Chile) Fernanda Brito	6–2, 3–6, 6–1
Loss	18.	Aug 2012	ITF Sao Paulo, Brazil	Hard	(Brazil) Roxane Vaisemberg	4–6, 6–4, 6–7^{(7)}
Loss	19.	Jun 2013	ITF Santos, Brazil	Clay	(Brazil) Gabriela Cé	6–7, 2–6
Win	20.	Sep 2013	ITF Curitiba, Brazil	Clay	(Brazil) Nathaly Kurata	6–1, 6–4

=== Doubles: 30 (15 titles, 15 runner-ups) ===
Result	No.	Date	Tournament	Surface	Partner	Opponents	Score
Win	1.	7 November 2005	ITF São Paulo, Brazil	Hard	(Brazil) Roxane Vaisemberg	(Brazil) Vanessa Menga (Brazil) Andrea Vieira	3–6, 7–5, 6–4
Win	2.	3 March 2007	ITF Benin City	Hard	(Venezuela) Mariana Muci	(Belgium) Debbrich Feys (Ukraine) Kateryna Polunina	3–6, 6–3, 7–5
Loss	3.	9 March 2007	ITF Benin City	Hard	(Venezuela) Mariana Muci	(Belgium) Debbrich Feys (Ukraine) Kateryna Polunina	3–6, 4–6
Loss	4.	18 August 2007	ITF Bogotá, Colombia	Clay	(Brazil) Teliana Pereira	(Brazil) Joana Cortez (Brazil) Roxane Vaisemberg	7–5, 4–6, 4–6
Loss	5.	10 November 2007	ITF Lima, Peru	Clay	(Venezuela) Mariana Muci	(Bolivia) María Fernanda Álvarez Terán (Peru) Claudia Razzeto	6–3, 6–7^{(4)}, [5–10]
Loss	6.	5 April 2008	ITF Obregón, Mexico	Hard	(Brazil) Fernanda Hermenegildo	(Japan) Miki Miyamura (United States) Anne Yelsey	0–6, 1–6
Win	7.	19 April 2008	ITF Mazatlán, Mexico	Hard	(Slovakia) Dominika Diešková	(Argentina) Carla Beltrami (United States) Nataly Yoo	6–4, 6–0
Loss	8.	28 June 2008	ITF Wichita, United States	Hard	(Slovakia) Dominika Diešková	(United States) Christina McHale (United States) Sloane Stephens	3–6, 2–6
Loss	9.	7 September 2008	ITF Barueri, Brazil	Hard	(Brazil) Fernanda Hermenegildo	(Brazil) Maria Fernanda Alves (Brazil) Carla Tiene	2–6, 3–6
Loss	10.	13 September 2008	ITF Santos, Brazil	Clay	(Brazil) Fernanda Hermenegildo	(Brazil) Joana Cortez (Brazil) Natalia Guitler	1–6, 3–6
Loss	11.	27 September 2008	ITF Serra Negra, Brazil	Clay	(Brazil) Fernanda Hermenegildo	(Brazil) Carla Forte (Brazil) Carla Tiene	4–6, 6–2, [8–10]
Win	12.	25 October 2008	ITF Valencia, Venezuela	Hard	(Brazil) Carla Tiene	(Slovenia) Petra Pajalič (United States) Katie Ruckert	6–2, 7–6^{(6)}
Win	13.	1 November 2008	ITF Valencia, Venezuela	Hard	(Brazil) Carla Tiene	(Slovenia) Petra Pajalič (United States) Katie Ruckert	5–7, 7–6^{(1)}, [10–4]
Loss	14.	12 December 2008	ITF Havana, Cuba	Hard	(Belgium) Davinia Lobbinger	(Venezuela) Josymar Escalona (Dominican Republic) Francesca Segarelli	5–7, 4–6
Loss	15.	20 June 2009	ITF Belém, Brazil	Hard	(United States) Megan Moulton-Levy	(Brazil) Maria Fernanda Alves (Brazil) Carla Tiene	6–7^{(1)}, 5–7
Loss	16.	7 November 2009	ITF Buenos Aires, Argentina	Clay	(Argentina) Aranza Salut	(Argentina) Luciana Sarmenti (Argentina) Emilia Yorio	2–6, 2–6
Win	17.	14 November 2009	ITF Itajai, Brazil	Clay	(Brazil) Fernanda Hermenegildo	(Argentina) Tatiana Búa (Colombia) Karen Castiblanco	3–6, 6–2, [10–7]
Win	18.	11 December 2009	ITF Santiago, Chile	Clay	(Argentina) Verónica Spiegel	(Argentina) Carla Lucero (Argentina) Julieta Soledad Rodriguez	6–1, 6–4
Win	19.	10 April 2010	ITF Jackson, United States	Clay	(Brazil) Maria Fernanda Alves	(Argentina) María Irigoyen (Argentina) Florencia Molinero	6–4, 3–6, [10–5]
Win	20.	23 July 2010	ITF Brasília, Brazil	Hard	(Brazil) Fernanda Hermenegildo	(Brazil) Monique Albuquerque (Brazil) Roxane Vaisemberg	6–2, 6–4
Win	21.	14 August 2010	ITF Itaparica, Brazil	Hard	(Brazil) Roxane Vaisemberg	(Brazil) Fernanda Hermenegildo (Brazil) Nathalia Rossi	6–2, 6–0
Win	22.	15 October 2010	ITF Mount Gambier, Australia	Hard	(Australia) Alison Bai	(Indonesia) Ayu Fani Damayanti (Indonesia) Jessy Rompies	w/o
Win	23.	20 November 2010	ITF Niteroi, Brazil	Clay	(Brazil) Maria Fernanda Alves	(Brazil) Monique Albuquerque (Brazil) Fernanda Hermenegildo	6–4, 6–4
Win	24.	4 December 2010	ITF Rio de Janeiro, Brazil	Clay	(Brazil) Maria Fernanda Alves	(France) Alizé Lim (Argentina) Paula Ormaechea	def.
Loss	25.	18 September 2011	ITF Rotterdam, Netherlands	Clay	(Brazil) Vivian Segnini	(Netherlands) Leonie Mekel (Netherlands) Anouk Tigu	4–6, 5–7
Win	26.	23 April 2012	ITF Sao Paulo, Brazil	Clay	(Venezuela) Gabriela Paz	(Brazil) Gabriela Cé (Brazil) Carla Forte	5–7, 6–3, [10–5]
Loss	27.	3 June 2013	ITF Santos, Brazil	Clay	(Brazil) Nathaly Kurata	(Argentina) Andrea Benítez (Brazil) Carla Forte	4–6, 1–6
Loss	28.	9 September 2013	ITF Curitiba, Brazil	Clay	(Brazil) Maria Vitória Beirão	(Brazil) Carolina Alves (Brazil) Leticia Garcia Vidal	6–4, 4–6, [8–10]
Win	29.	24 March 2014	ITF Ribeirão Preto, Brazil	Clay	(Brazil) Maria Fernanda Alves	(Brazil) Gabriela Cé (Brazil) Eduarda Piai	6–4, 4–6, [11–9]
Loss	30.	2 June 2014	ITF Campos do Jordão, Brazil	Hard	(Argentina) Victoria Bosio	(Brazil) Laura Pigossi (Brazil) Nathália Rossi	4–6, 2–6
