= Andrea Koch Benvenuto =

Chilean tennis player

- Full name: Karina Andrea Koch Benvenuto
- Country (sports): Chile
- Born: 26 April 1985 (age 40) Santiago, Chile
- Height: 1.74 m (5 ft 9 in)
- Prize money: $118,523

Singles
- Career record: 364–231
- Career titles: 14 ITF
- Highest ranking: No. 224 (11 June 2012)

Doubles
- Career record: 196–123
- Career titles: 19 ITF
- Highest ranking: No. 289 (11 June 2012)

Team competitions
- Fed Cup: 41–32
Medal record
Representing Chile
Pan American Games
Silver medal – second place	2011 Guadalajara	Mixed Doubles
South American Games
Bronze medal – third place	2014 Santiago	Mixed Doubles

Karina Andrea Koch Benvenuto (Spanish pronunciation: [anˈdɾea ˈkox βembeˈnuto]; (Note: In isolation, Benvenuto is pronounced [bembeˈnuto].) born 26 April 1985) is a Chilean former tennis player.

In her career, Koch Benvenuto won 14 singles titles and 19 doubles titles on the ITF Women's Circuit. On 11 June 2012, she reached her best singles ranking of world No. 224, and peaked at No. 289 in the doubles rankings.

Competing for Chile in the Fed Cup, Koch Benvenuto has a win–loss record of 41–32.

== ITF Circuit finals ==
=== Singles: 26 (14 titles, 12 runner-ups) ===
Legend $100,000 tournaments $75,000 tournaments $50,000 tournaments $25,000 tournaments $10,000 tournaments	Finals by surface Hard (3–2) Clay (11–10)

Result	W–L	Date	Tournament	Tier	Surface	Opponent	Score
Loss	0–1	Aug 2004	ITF La Paz, Bolivia	10,000	Clay	(Brazil) Jenifer Widjaja	6–3, 4–6, 0–6
Loss	0–2	Jun 2005	ITF Santa Tecla, El Salvador	10,000	Clay	(Argentina) Andrea Benítez	3–6, 0–6
Loss	0–3	Aug 2005	ITF Bogotá, Colombia	10,000	Clay	(Brazil) Carla Tiene	4–6, 0–6
Loss	0–4	May 2006	ITF Obregón, Mexico	10,000	Hard	(United States) Ellah Nze	6–4, 3–6, 3–6
Win	1–4	Jun 2006	ITF Xalapa, Mexico	10,000	Hard	(Argentina) María Irigoyen	6–1, 3–6, 6–4
Win	2–4	Sep 2009	ITF Mazatlán, Mexico	10,000	Hard	(Brazil) Fernanda Hermenegildo	6–1, 6–2
Win	3–4	Nov 2009	ITF Bogotá, Colombia	10,000	Clay	(Colombia) Yuliana Lizarazo	7–6^{(7–5)}, 6–4
Loss	3–5	Nov 2009	ITF Asunción, Paraguay	10,000	Clay	(Argentina) Paula Ormaechea	6–4, 4–6, 2–6
Win	4–5	Nov 2010	ITF Bogotá, Colombia	10,000	Clay	(Peru) Patricia Kú Flores	6–1, 7–5
Win	5–5	Nov 2010	ITF Santiago, Chile	10,000	Clay	(Paraguay) Verónica Cepede Royg	6–2, 6–2
Win	6–5	Jul 2011	ITF Ribeirão Preto, Brazil	10,000	Clay	(Brazil) Vivian Segnini	6–2, 6–2
Loss	6–6	Aug 2011	ITF Santa Cruz de la Sierra, Bolivia	10,000	Clay	(Argentina) María Irigoyen	2–6, 3–6
Win	7–6	Aug 2011	ITF La Paz, Bolivia	10,000	Clay	(Argentina) María Irigoyen	6–0, 7–6^{(7–1)}
Loss	7–7	Oct 2011	ITF Yerevan, Armenia	25,000	Clay	(United States) Julia Cohen	6–7^{(6–8)}, 2–6
Loss	7–8	Mar 2012	ITF Bangalore, India	25,000	Hard	(Croatia) Donna Vekić	2–6, 4–6
Loss	7–9	May 2012	ITF Brasília, Brazil	25,000	Clay	(Venezuela) Gabriela Paz	3–6, 3–6
Win	8–9	Nov 2012	ITF Barranquilla, Colombia	10,000	Clay	(Germany) Karolina Nowak	7–6^{(7–4)}, 6–0
Win	9–9	Oct 2013	ITF Bogotá, Colombia	10,000	Hard	(Netherlands) Anna Katalina Alzate Esmurzaeva	6–3, 6–3
Win	10–9	Nov 2013	ITF Lima, Peru	10,000	Clay	(Peru) Patricia Kú Flores	7–5, 6–7^{(4–7)}, 6–2
Win	11–9	Nov 2013	ITF Bogotá, Colombia	10,000	Clay	(Hungary) Naomi Totka	6–1, 6–1
Loss	11–10	Dec 2013	ITF Barranquilla, Colombia	10,000	Clay	(Colombia) María Fernanda Herazo	4–6, 2–6
Win	12–10	Jul 2014	ITF Santa Cruz de la Sierra, Bolivia	10,000	Clay	(Argentina) Julieta Lara Estable	6–2, 7–5
Win	13–10	Aug 2014	ITF Quito, Ecuador	10,000	Clay	(Argentina) Sofía Blanco	6–3, 6–4
Win	14–10	Oct 2014	ITF Pereira, Colombia	10,000	Clay	(United States) Nicole Frenkel	7–6^{(7–1)}, 6–2
Loss	14–11	Oct 2014	ITF Pereira 2	10,000	Clay	(Hungary) Lilla Barzó	4–6, 2–6
Loss	14–12	Nov 2014	ITF Bogotá, Colombia	10,000	Clay	(Argentina) Victoria Bosio	6–7^{(3–7)}, 1–6

=== Doubles: 34 (19 titles, 15 runner-ups) ===
Legend $25,000 tournaments $10,000 tournaments	Finals by surface Hard (3–1) Clay (16–14)

Result	No.	Date	Tier	Tournament	Surface	Partner	Opponents	Score
Loss	1.	18 August 2003	10,000	ITF La Paz, Bolivia	Clay	(Chile) Valentina Castro	(Brazil) Marcela Evangelista (Brazil) Letícia Sobral	6–3, 3–6, 0–1 ret.
Loss	2.	6 June 2005	10,000	ITF Santa Tecla, El Salvador	Clay	(Argentina) Patricia Holzman	(Argentina) Andrea Benítez (Argentina) Flavia Mignola	w/o
Win	1.	15 August 2005	10,000	ITF Guayaquil, Ecuador	Hard	(Argentina) Verónica Spiegel	(United States) Kit Carson (Australia) Dragana Jakovljevic	6–1, 6–2
Win	2.	29 August 2005	10,000	ITF Santa Cruz de la Sierra, Bolivia	Clay	(Argentina) Verónica Spiegel	(Slovakia) Dominika Diešková (United States) Courtney Nagle	6–3, 6–3
Win	3.	10 July 2006	10,000	ITF Caracas, Venezuela	Hard	(Argentina) Betina Jozami	(Argentina) María Irigoyen (Argentina) Flavia Mignola	4–6, 6–2, 6–2
Loss	3.	7 August 2006	10,000	ITF Quito, Ecuador	Clay	(Argentina) Jesica Orselli	(Brazil) Fabiana Mak (Brazil) Roxane Vaisemberg	2–6, 3–6
Loss	4.	14 August 2006	10,000	ITF Guayaquil, Ecuador	Hard	(Argentina) Jesica Orselli	(Uruguay) Estefanía Craciún (Venezuela) Mariana Muci	6–3, 6–7^{(5–7)}, 3–6
Win	4.	26 November 2007	10,000	ITF Santiago, Chile	Clay	(Argentina) Soledad Esperón	(Argentina) Salome Llaguno (Argentina) Verónica Spiegel	6–3, 2–6, [10–8]
Win	5.	7 April 2008	10,000	ITF Los Mochis, Mexico	Clay	(Argentina) Vanesa Furlanetto	(Croatia) Indire Akiki (United States) Allie Will	6–0, 7–5
Win	6.	13 October 2008	10,000	ITF Lima, Peru	Clay	(Colombia) Karen Castiblanco	(Venezuela) Marina Giral Lores (Argentina) Paula Ormaechea	6–2, 6–1
Win	7.	20 October 2008	10,000	ITF Lima	Clay	(Colombia) Karen Castiblanco	(Venezuela) Marina Giral Lores (Argentina) Paula Ormaechea	6–7^{(7–9)}, 6–0, [10–3]
Loss	5.	27 October 2008	10,000	ITF Lima	Clay	(Argentina) Vanesa Furlanetto	(Peru) Bianca Botto (Colombia) Karen Castiblanco	1–6, 3–6
Win	8.	10 November 2008	10,000	ITF Santiago, Chile	Clay	(Colombia) Karen Castiblanco	(Czech Republic) Kateřina Kramperová (United States) Nataly Yoo	w/o
Loss	6.	27 April 2009	10,000	ITF Buenos Aires, Argentina	Clay	(Colombia) Karen Castiblanco	(Brazil) Maria Fernanda Alves (Brazil) Carla Tiene	3–6, 3–6
Win	9.	21 September 2009	10,000	ITF Obregón, Mexico	Hard	(Brazil) Natalia Guitler	(United States) Jamie Hampton (United States) Whitney Jones	7–6^{(8–6)}, 6–4
Win	10.	28 September 2009	10,000	ITF Juárez, Mexico	Clay	(Colombia) Paula Zabala	(Argentina) Lucía Jara Lozano (Chile) Giannina Minieri	6–0, 3–6, [10–4]
Loss	7.	12 October 2009	10,000	ITF Mexico City, Mexico	Clay	(Colombia) Paula Zabala	(Slovakia) Dominika Diešková (Mexico) Daniela Múñoz Gallegos	w/o
Win	11.	2 November 2009	10,000	ITF Bogotá, Colombia	Clay	(Colombia) Karen Castiblanco	(Colombia) Yuliana Lizarazo (Colombia) Paula Zabala	6–3, 6–1
Win	12.	16 November 2009	10,000	ITF Asunción, Paraguay	Clay	(Argentina) Vanesa Furlanetto	(Brazil) Raquel Piltcher (Brazil) Roxane Vaisemberg	6–4, 2–6, [10–5]
Win	13.	23 November 2009	10,000	ITF Lima	Clay	(Chile) Cecilia Costa Melgar	(Argentina) Agustina Eskenazi (Argentina) Paula Ormaechea	6–1, 6–3
Loss	8.	30 November 2009	10,000	ITF La Serena, Chile	Clay	(Chile) Giannina Minieri	(Chile) Fernanda Brito (Paraguay) Verónica Cepede Royg	6–4, 0–6, [6–10]
Win	14.	14 December 2009	10,000	ITF Quito, Ecuador	Clay	(Ecuador) Mariana Correa	(Ecuador) Alejandra Álvarez (Ecuador) Marie Elise Casares	7–6^{(7–3)}, 6–2
Loss	9.	15 March 2010	10,000	ITF Antalya, Turkey	Clay	(Oman) Fatma Al-Nabhani	(Netherlands) Kiki Bertens (Netherlands) Daniëlle Harmsen	2–6, 4–6
Loss	10.	5 July 2010	25,000	ITF Aschaffenburg, Germany	Clay	(Romania) Elena Bogdan	(Serbia) Teodora Mirčić (Japan) Erika Sema	6–7^{(4–7)}, 6–2, [8–10]
Loss	11.	11 October 2010	10,000	ITF Lima, Peru	Clay	(Colombia) Karen Castiblanco	(Brazil) Maria Fernanda Alves (Brazil) Isabela Miro	4–6, 4–6
Win	15.	25 October 2010	10,000	ITF Bogotá, Colombia	Clay	(Colombia) Karen Castiblanco	(Chile) Fernanda Brito (Chile) Daniela Seguel	1–6, 6–3, [10–6]
Loss	12.	1 November 2010	10,000	ITF Bogotá	Clay	(Colombia) Karen Castiblanco	(Colombia) Yuliana Lizarazo (Venezuela) Adriana Pérez	2–6, 6–7^{(5–7)}
Win	16.	8 November 2010	10,000	ITF Bogotá	Clay	(Colombia) Karen Castiblanco	(Colombia) Karen Ramírez Rivera (Chile) Daniela Seguel	6–4, 7–5
Loss	13.	11 July 2011	25,000	ITF Bogotá	Clay	(United States) Julia Cohen	(Venezuela) Andrea Gámiz (Venezuela) Adriana Pérez	3–6, 4–6
Win	17.	8 August 2011	10,000	ITF Santa Cruz de la Sierra, Bolivia	Clay	(Argentina) María Irigoyen	(Paraguay) Jazmín Britos (Paraguay) Giovanna Tomita	6–2, 6–1
Win	18.	15 August 2011	10,000	ITF La Paz, Bolivia	Clay	(Argentina) María Irigoyen	(Argentina) Carla Lucero (Argentina) Luciana Sarmenti	6–2, 6–2
Loss	14.	19 September 2011	25,000	ITF Tbilisi, Georgia	Clay	(Romania) Elena Bogdan	(Ukraine) Irina Buryachok (Hungary) Réka Luca Jani	6–7^{(3–7)}, 2–6
Win	19.	25 November 2013	10,000	ITF Bogotá	Clay	(United States) Daniella Roldan	(Colombia) María Fernanda Herazo (Hungary) Naomi Totka	6–1, 6–4
Loss	15.	2 December 2013	10,000	ITF Barranquilla, Colombia	Clay	(United States) Daniella Roldan	(Colombia) María Paulina Pérez (Colombia) Paula Andrea Pérez	1–6, 4–6
