= Vivian Segnini =

Brazilian tennis player

- Country (sports): Brazil
- Residence: Porto Alegre
- Born: 3 January 1989 (age 36); São Carlos
- Height: 1.65 m (5 ft 5 in)
- Turned pro: 2004
- Plays: Right-handed (two-handed backhand)

Singles
- Career record: 172–137
- Career titles: 1 ITF
- Highest ranking: No. 275 (24 October 2011)

Doubles
- Career record: 101–93
- Career titles: 5 ITF
- Highest ranking: No. 244 (2 April 2012)

Vivian Segnini (born 3 January 1989) is a former Brazilian tennis player.

On 24 October 2011, she achieved her career-high singles ranking of world No. 275. On 2 April 2012, she peaked at No. 244 in the doubles rankings. Only three months later, she had her last appearance on the ITF Circuit when she lost in the third round of the qualifying competition of a $25,000 event in Torun, Poland.

She is currently head coach of the Winthrop University’s Women’s Tennis team.

== ITF Circuit finals ==
$100,000 tournaments
$75,000 tournaments
$50,000 tournaments
$25,000 tournaments
$10,000 tournaments

=== Singles: 12 (1–11) ===
Result	No.	Date	Tournament	Surface	Opponent	Score
Loss	1.	8 October 2006	ITF Tucumán, Argentina	Clay	(Brazil) Teliana Pereira	2–6, 1–6
Loss	2.	10 November 2007	ITF Lima, Peru	Clay	(Bolivia) María Fernanda Álvarez Terán	6–7^{(2–7)}, 2–6
Loss	3.	9 December 2007	ITF Havana, Cuba	Hard	(Slovenia) Jasmina Kajtazovič	3–6, 1–6
Loss	4.	4 May 2008	ITF Adana, Turkey	Clay	(Ukraine) Lesia Tsurenko	6–4, 1–6, 1–6
Loss	5.	8 June 2008	ITF Izmir, Turkey	Hard	(Turkey) Pemra Ozgen	2–6, 6–7^{(5–7)}
Win	1.	20 July 2008	ITF Cartagena, Colombia	Hard	(Venezuela) Marina Giral Lores	7–6^{(10–8)}, 6–2
Loss	6.	18 October 2009	ITF Bauru, Brazil	Clay	(Paraguay) Verónica Cepede Royg	0–6, 3–6
Loss	7.	25 October 2009	ITF Santa Cruz, Bolivia	Clay	(Paraguay) Verónica Cepede Royg	2–6, 2–6
Loss	8.	31 October 2009	ITF Fortaleza, Brazil	Clay	(Brazil) Roxane Vaisemberg	4–6, 6–7^{(5–7)}
Loss	9.	20 December 2009	ITF Veracruz, Mexico	Hard	(United States) Hsu Chieh-yu	5–7, 4–6
Loss	10.	28 May 2011	ITF Itaparica, Brazil	Clay	(Brazil) Roxane Vaisemberg	0–6, 1–6
Loss	11.	23 July 2011	ITF Ribeirão Preto, Brazil	Clay	(Chile) Andrea Koch Benvenuto	2–6, 2–6

=== Doubles: 11 (5–6) ===
Result	No.	Date	Tournament	Surface	Partnering	Opponents	Score
Loss	1.	18 May 2008	ITF Bucharest, Romania	Clay	(Romania) Ioana Ivan	(Slovakia) Klaudia Boczová (Slovakia) Romana Tabak	2–6, 0–6
Win	1.	1 August 2009	ITF Campos do Jordão, Brazil	Hard	(Brazil) Larissa Carvalho	(Brazil) Monique Albuquerque (Brazil) Paula Cristina Gonçalves	3–6, 6–1, [10–7]
Win	2.	5 September 2009	ITF Celaya, Mexico	Clay	(United States) Julia Cohen	(Brazil) Nathália Rossi (Ukraine) Anastasia Kharchenko	6–1, 6–4
Loss	2.	12 December 2009	ITF Xalapa, Mexico	Hard	(Slovakia) Dominika Diešková	(United States) Amanda Fink (United States) Elizabeth Lumpkin	7–5, 2–6, [13–15]
Loss	3.	9 October 2010	ITF Londrina, Brazil	Clay	(Paraguay) Verónica Cepede Royg	(Chile) Camila Silva (Colombia) Karen Castiblanco	4–6, 3–6
Win	3.	15 October 2010	ITF São Paulo, Brazil	Clay	(Brazil) Monique Albuquerque	(Brazil) Nathália Rossi (Argentina) Barbara Rush	6–4, 6–4
Win	4.	23 October 2010	ITF Santa Maria, Brazil	Clay	(Paraguay) Verónica Cepede Royg	(Brazil) Roxane Vaisemberg (Brazil) Natasha Lotuffo	w/o
Win	5.	30 October 2010	ITF Itu, Brazil	Clay	(Brazil) Gabriela Cé	(Brazil) Flávia Dechandt Araújo (Brazil) Carla Forte	6–0, 6–4
Loss	4.	27 May 2011	ITF Itaparica, Brazil	Clay	(Brazil) Roxane Vaisemberg	(Brazil) Monique Albuquerque (Argentina) Aranza Salut	3–6, 6–4, [9–11]
Loss	5.	18 September 2011	ITF Rotterdam, Netherlands	Clay	(Brazil) Ana Clara Duarte	(Netherlands) Leonie Mekel (Netherlands) Anouk Tigu	4–6, 5–7
Loss	6.	10 December 2011	ITF Buenos Aires, Argentina	Clay	(Brazil) Teliana Pereira	(Argentina) Mailen Auroux (Argentina) María Irigoyen	1–6, 3–6
