= Fernanda Hermenegildo =

Brazilian tennis player

- Country (sports): Brazil
- Residence: Florianópolis, Brazil
- Born: 13 October 1988 (age 36)
- Height: 1.66 m (5 ft 5 1/2 in)
- Plays: Right (two-handed backhand)
- Prize money: US$ 52,261

Singles
- Career record: 168–144
- Career titles: 3 ITF
- Highest ranking: No. 370 (30 August 2010)

Doubles
- Career record: 134–96
- Career titles: 8 ITF
- Highest ranking: No. 251 (11 August 2011)

Fernanda Kuhnen Hermenegildo (born 13 October 1988) is a former professional Brazilian tennis player and member of the Brazil Fed Cup team.

On August 30, 2010, she reached her highest singles ranking by the WTA of 370 whilst her best doubles ranking was 251 on August 22, 2011.

== ITF Circuit finals ==
Legend
$100,000 tournaments
$75,000 tournaments
$50,000 tournaments
$25,000 tournaments
$10,000 tournaments

=== Singles: 6 (3–3) ===
Result	No.	Date	Tournament	Surface	Opponent	Score
Loss	1.	27 July 2008	Brasília, Brazil	Clay	(Brazil) Nathália Rossi	2–6, 4–6
Win	2.	14 September 2008	Santos, Brazil	Clay	(Brazil) Natalia Guitler	6–3, 6–4
Win	3.	4 October 2008	Curitiba, Brazil	Clay	(Venezuela) Marina Giral Lores	6–4, 1–6, 6–3
Loss	4.	12 October 2008	Mogi das Cruzes, Brazil	Clay	(Argentina) Aranza Salut	6–7^{(3–7)}, 1–6
Loss	5.	7 September 2009	Mazatlán, Mexico	Hard	(Chile) Andrea Koch Benvenuto	1–6, 2–6
Win	6.	22 August 2010	Itaparica, Brazil	Hard	(Brazil) Roxane Vaisemberg	6–1, 6–7^{(5–7)}, 6–3

=== Doubles: 24 (8–16) ===
Result	No.	Date	Tournament	Surface	Partnering	Opponents	Score
Loss	1.	28 November 2004	Florianópolis, Brazil	Clay	(Paraguay) Sarah Tami Masi	(Brazil) Joana Cortez (Brazil) Marcela Evangelista	4–6, 4–6
Loss	2.	3 October 2005	Córdoba, Argentina	Clay	(Paraguay) Sarah Tami Masi	(Argentina) María Irigoyen (Argentina) Luciana Sarmenti	3–6, 6–3, 2–6
Loss	3.	11 November 2006	Itajaí, Brazil	Clay	(Slovakia) Monika Kochanová	(Brazil) Teliana Pereira (Belgium) Yanina Wickmayer	3–6, 3–6
Loss	4.	18 February 2007	Mallorca, Spain	Clay	(Brazil) Fabiana Mak	(Italy) Valentina Sulpizio (Italy) Stefania Chieppa	7–5, 3–6, 4–6
Loss	5.	30 April 2007	Buenos Aires, Argentina	Clay	(Brazil) Nicole Buitoni	(Argentina) Andrea Benítez (Argentina) María Irigoyen	2–6, 2–6
Loss	6.	5 April 2008	Obregón, Mexico	Hard	(Brazil) Ana Clara Duarte	(Japan) Miki Miyamura (United States) Anne Yelsey	0–6, 1–6
Loss	7.	7 September 2008	Barueri, Brazil	Hard	(Brazil) Ana Clara Duarte	(Brazil) Maria Fernanda Alves (Brazil) Carla Tiene	2–6, 3–6
Loss	8.	13 September 2008	Santos, Brazil	Clay	(Brazil) Ana Clara Duarte	(Brazil) Joana Cortez (Brazil) Natalia Guitler	1–6, 3–6
Loss	9.	27 September 2008	Serra Negra, Brazil	Clay	(Brazil) Ana Clara Duarte	(Brazil) Carla Forte (Brazil) Carla Tiene	4–6, 6–2, [8–10]
Win	10.	29 November 2008	Buenos Aires, Argentina	Clay	(Brazil) Teliana Pereira	(Argentina) Tatiana Búa (Argentina) María Irigoyen	6–3, 6–2
Loss	11.	30 May 2009	Córdoba, Argentina	Clay	(Brazil) Carla Tiene	(Argentina) María Irigoyen (Argentina) Carla Beltrami	3–6, 4–6
Loss	12.	29 August 2009	Barueri, Brazil	Hard	(Argentina) Mailen Auroux	(Brazil) Monique Albuquerque (Brazil) Roxane Vaisemberg	6–7^{(7)}, 5–7
Win	13.	12 September 2009	Mazatlán, Mexico	Hard	(Argentina) Mailen Auroux	(Mexico) Erika Clarke (Mexico) Daniela Múñoz Gallegos	6–3, 3–6, [12–10]
Loss	14.	19 September 2009	Los Monchis, Mexico	Clay	(Argentina) Mailen Auroux	(United States) Yawna Allen (United States) Alina Sullivan	6–4, 4–6, [10–12]
Win	15.	14 November 2009	Itajaí, Brazil	Clay	(Brazil) Ana Clara Duarte	(Argentina) Tatiana Búa (Colombia) Karen Castiblanco	3–6, 6–2, [10–7]
Loss	16.	15 May 2010	Rio de Janeiro, Brazil	Clay	(Argentina) Mailen Auroux	(Brazil) Maria Fernanda Alves (Argentina) Florencia Molinero	2–6, 4–6
Win	17.	23 July 2010	Brasília, Brazil	Hard	(Brazil) Ana Clara Duarte	(Brazil) Monique Albuquerque (Brazil) Roxane Vaisemberg	6–2, 6–4
Win	18.	8 August 2010	Brasília, Brazil	Hard	(Brazil) Monique Albuquerque	(Brazil) Fernanda Faria (Brazil) Paula Cristina Gonçalves	7–6^{(5)}, 6–4
Loss	19.	14 August 2010	Itaparica, Brazil	Hard	(Brazil) Nathália Rossi	(Brazil) Ana Clara Duarte (Brazil) Roxane Vaisemberg	2–6, 0–6
Loss	20.	20 November 2010	Niterói, Brazil	Clay	(Brazil) Monique Albuquerque	(Brazil) Maria Fernanda Alves (Brazil) Ana Clara Duarte	4–6, 4–6
Loss	21.	27 March 2011	Poza Rica, Mexico	Hard	(Brazil) Teliana Pereira	(United States) Macall Harkins (Austria) Nicole Rottmann	2–6, 4–6
Win	22.	16 May 2011	Brescia, Italy	Clay	(Colombia) Karen Castiblanco	(Italy) Evelyn Mayr (Italy) Julia Mayr	4–6, 6–3, 6–4
Win	23.	31 July 2011	Campos do Jordão, Brazil	Hard	(Brazil) Teliana Pereira	(Brazil) Maria Fernanda Alves (Brazil) Roxane Vaisemberg	3–6, 7–6^{(5)}, [11–9]
Win	24.	8 Aug 2011	São Paulo, Brazil	Clay	(Brazil) Maria Fernanda Alves	(Brazil) Eduarda Piai (Brazil) Karina Venditti	7–6^{(8)}, 4–6, [14–12]
