= Mailen Auroux =

Argentine tennis player

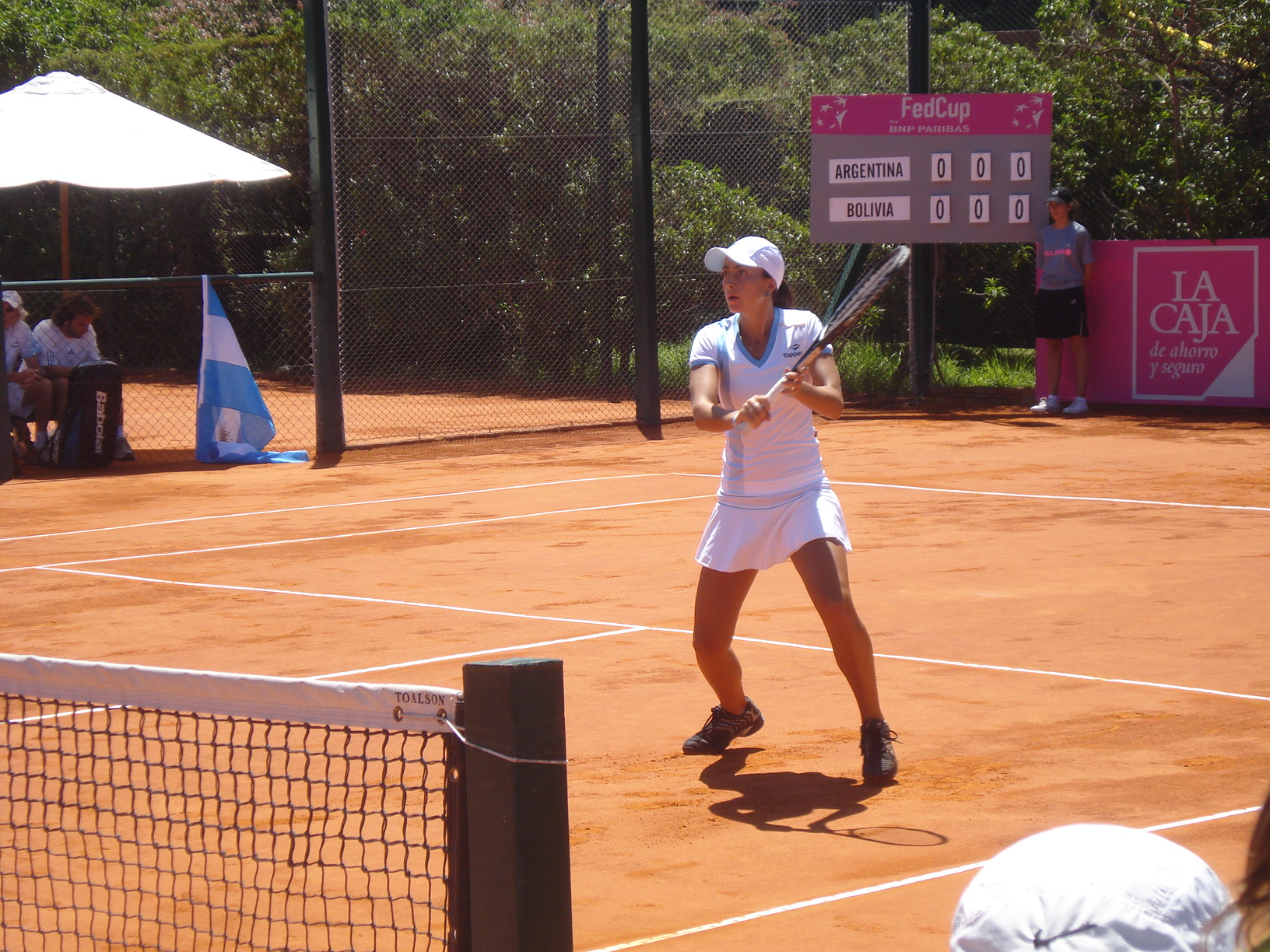
- Mailen Auroux, 2011
- Country (sports): Argentina
- Residence: Buenos Aires
- Born: 25 July 1988 (age 36); Buenos Aires
- Height: 1.70 m (5 ft 7 in)
- Turned pro: 2006
- Plays: Right (two-handed backhand)
- Prize money: $102,016

Singles
- Career record: 220–131
- Career titles: 12 ITF
- Highest ranking: No. 241 (22 October 2012)

Doubles
- Career record: 199–93
- Career titles: 22 ITF
- Highest ranking: No. 125 (24 September 2012)

Team competitions
- Fed Cup: 7–3

Mailen Auroux (Spanish pronunciation: [ˈmajlen awˈɾuks]; born 25 July 1988) is a retired tennis player from Argentina.

Auroux enjoyed success at the ITF Women's Circuit, winning 12 singles and 22 doubles titles, and made her debut for Argentina Fed Cup team in the 2010 Fed Cup World Group II, scoring a doubles win against Estonia. On 22 October 2012, she reached her career-high singles ranking of world No. 346. On 24 September 2012, she peaked at No. 125 in the doubles rankings.

== ITF finals ==
=== Singles: 20 (12–8) ===
Legend $50,000 tournaments $25,000 tournaments $10,000 tournaments	Finals by surface Hard (2–0) Clay (10–8)

Result	No.	Date	Location	Surface	Opponent	Score
Loss	1.	21 October 2006	Santiago, Chile	Clay	(Brazil) Teliana Pereira	6–4, 2–6, 3–6
Loss	2.	5 May 2007	Buenos Aires, Argentina	Clay	(Argentina) Agustina Lepore	5–7, 0–2 ret.
Win	1.	15 July 2007	Prokuplje, Serbia	Clay	(Croatia) Indire Akiki	4–6, 6–1, 6–3
Win	2.	22 July 2007	Craiova, Romania	Clay	(Netherlands) Chayenne Ewijk	6–7, 6–2, 6–2
Win	3.	21 October 2007	Serra Negra, Brazil	Clay	(Argentina) Tatiana Búa	6–0, 6–0
Win	4.	28 October 2007	Itu, Brazil	Clay	(United States) Christina McHale	7–5, 6–2
Loss	3.	2 March 2008	Sant Boi, Spain	Clay	(Spain) Sara del Barrio Aragón	5–7, 5–7
Loss	4.	18 April 2008	Buenos Aires, Argentina	Clay	(Argentina) María Irigoyen	3–6, 4–6
Win	5.	2 May 2008	Buenos Aires, Argentina	Clay	(Argentina) María Irigoyen	6–2, 6–3
Win	6.	30 August 2009	Barueri, Brazil	Hard	(Brazil) Natalia Guitler	6–4, 6–2
Win	7.	6 September 2009	Celaya, Mexico	Clay	(Mexico) Alejandra Granillo	6–3, 6–1
Loss	5.	20 September 2009	Los Monchis, Mexico	Clay	(Argentina) Carla Beltrami	4–6, 2–6
Win	8.	27 September 2009	Obregón, Mexico	Hard	(Brazil) Nathalia Rossi	6–3, 6–0
Win	9.	3 October 2009	Juárez, Mexico	Clay	(Argentina) Paula Ormaechea	2–6, 6–2, 6–3
Win	10.	12 June 2010	Córdoba, Argentina	Clay	(Argentina) Agustina Lepore	5–3 ret.
Win	11.	21 June 2010	Buenos Aires, Argentina	Clay	(Argentina) Paula Ormaechea	6–1, 7–5
Win	12.	29 August 2010	Buenos Aires, Argentina	Clay	(Argentina) Vanesa Furlanetto	6–2, 7–5
Loss	6.	12 February 2011	Buenos Aires, Argentina	Clay	(Argentina) Catalina Pella	4–6, 6–2, 3–6
Loss	7.	12 December 2011	Santiago, Chile	Clay	(Paraguay) Verónica Cepede Royg	0–6, 6–1, 3–6
Loss	8.	12 May 2012	Rosario, Argentina	Clay	(Brazil) Teliana Pereira	5–7, 6–7

=== Doubles: 40 (22–18) ===
Result	No.	Date	Location	Surface	Partner	Opponents	Score
Loss	1.	20 July 2007	Craiova, Romania	Clay	(Argentina) Vanesa Furlanetto	(Argentina) Andrea Benítez (Argentina) María Irigoyen	3–6, 4–6
Loss	2.	20 October 2007	Serra Negra, Brazil	Clay	(Argentina) Tatiana Búa	(United States) Christina McHale (United States) Allie Will	5–7, 3–6
Win	3.	27 October 2007	Itu, Brazil	Clay	(Argentina) Tatiana Búa	(Argentina) Lucía Jara Lozano (Peru) Claudia Razzeto	6–2, 5–7, [10–8]
Win	4.	10 February 2008	Cali, Colombia	Clay	(Uruguay) Estefanía Craciún	(Austria) Melanie Klaffner (Belarus) Ksenia Milevskaya	6–1, 6–4
Win	5.	1 March 2008	Sant Boi, Spain	Clay	(Uruguay) Estefanía Craciún	(Italy) Elisa Balsamo (Italy) Valentina Sulpizio	6–1, 6–3
Loss	6.	27 June 2008	Padova, Italy	Clay	(Germany) Carmen Klaschka	(Romania) Anda Perianu (Romania) Liana Ungur	3–6, 3–6
Loss	7.	12 July 2008	Bogotá, Colombia	Clay	(Italy) Nicole Clerico	(Colombia) Mariana Duque Marino (Colombia) Viky Núñez Fuentes	3–6, 4–6
Win	8.	3 August 2008	Campos do Jordão, Brazil	Hard	(Brazil) Roxane Vaisemberg	(Argentina) Jorgelina Cravero (Argentina) María Irigoyen	6–3, 6–4
Loss	9.	6 September 2008	Buenos Aires, Argentina	Clay	(Brazil) Roxane Vaisemberg	(Uruguay) Estefanía Craciún (Argentina) María Irigoyen	6–1, 1–6, [2–10]
Loss	10.	25 October 2008	Augusta, Georgia, United States	Hard	(Brazil) Roxane Vaisemberg	(Indonesia) Yayuk Basuki (Indonesia) Romana Tedjakusuma	3–6, 6–4, [5–10]
Win	11.	18 April 2009	Buenos Aires, Argentina	Clay	(Argentina) Verónica Spiegel	(Brazil) Maria Fernanda Alves (Brazil) Carla Tiene	6–2, 6–2
Loss	12.	29 August 2009	Barueri, Brazil	Hard	(Brazil) Fernanda Hermenegildo	(Brazil) Monique Albuquerque (Brazil) Roxane Vaisemberg	6–7^{(7)}, 5–7
Win	13.	12 September 2009	Mazatlán, Mexico	Hard	(Brazil) Fernanda Hermenegildo	(Mexico) Erika Clarke (Mexico) Daniela Múñoz Gallegos	6–3, 3–6, [12–10]
Loss	14.	19 September 2009	Los Monchis, Mexico	Clay	(Brazil) Fernanda Hermenegildo	(United States) Yawna Allen (United States) Alina Sullivan	6–4, 4–6, [10–12]
Win	15.	5 December 2009	Buenos Aires, Argentina	Clay	(Argentina) Verónica Spiegel	(Brazil) Fernanda Faria (Brazil) Paula Cristina Gonçalves	6–0, 6–0
Loss	16.	15 May 2010	Rio de Janeiro, Brazil	Clay	(Brazil) Fernanda Hermenegildo	(Brazil) Maria Fernanda Alves (Argentina) Florencia Molinero	2–6, 4–6
Win	17.	11 June 2010	Córdoba, Argentina	Clay	(Colombia) Karen Castiblanco	(Argentina) Luciana Sarmenti (Argentina) Emilia Yorio	6–1, 6–2
Loss	18.	18 June 2010	Buenos Aires, Argentina	Clay	(Colombia) Karen Castiblanco	(Argentina) Lucía Jara Lozano (Argentina) Guadalupe Pérez Rojas	7–6, 1–0 ret.
Loss	19.	18 July 2010	Bogotá, Colombia	Clay	(Colombia) Karen Castiblanco	(Venezuela) Andrea Gámiz (Argentina) Paula Ormaechea	7–5, 4–6, [8–10]
Win	20.	28 August 2010	Buenos Aires, Argentina	Clay	(Colombia) Karen Castiblanco	(Argentina) Estefania Donnet (Argentina) Carla Lucero	7–5, 6–0
Win	21.	18 September 2010	Zagreb, Croatia	Clay	(Serbia) Nataša Zorić	(Croatia) Ani Mijačika (Croatia) Ana Vrljić	7–5, 5–7, [14–12]
Win	22.	6 June 2011	Campobasso, Italy	Clay	(Argentina) María Irigoyen	(Croatia) Ani Mijacika (France) Irena Pavlovic	6–2, 3–6, 6–4
Win	23.	31 October 2011	Asunción, Paraguay	Clay	(Argentina) María Irigoyen	(Argentina) Tatiana Búa (Argentina) Luciana Sarmenti	6–3, 4–6, 6–3
Win	24.	7 November 2011	Asunción, Paraguay	Clay	(Argentina) María Irigoyen	(Norway) Ulrikke Eikeri (Venezuela) Andrea Gámiz	6–1, 2–6, 6–3
Loss	25.	14 November 2011	Asunción, Paraguay	Clay	(Argentina) María Irigoyen	(United States) Julia Cohen (Croatia) Tereza Mrdeža	6–3, 2–6, 6–3
Win	26.	28 November 2011	Rosario, Argentina	Clay	(Argentina) María Irigoyen	(Spain) Inés Ferrer Suárez (Netherlands) Richèl Hogenkamp	4–6, 6–1, 6–3
Win	27.	5 December 2011	Buenos Aires, Argentina	Clay	(Argentina) María Irigoyen	(Brazil) Teliana Pereira (Brazil) Vivian Segnini	6–1, 6–3
Loss	28.	12 December 2011	Santiago, Chile	Clay	(Argentina) María Irigoyen	(Spain) Inés Ferrer Suárez (Netherlands) Richèl Hogenkamp	6–4, 3–6, [10–5]
Win	29.	6 February 2012	Bertioga, Brazil	Hard	(Argentina) María Irigoyen	(Paraguay) Verónica Cepede Royg (Argentina) Florencia Molinero	6–3, 6–1
Loss	30.	2 April 2012	Jackson (Miss.), U.S.	Clay	(Argentina) María Irigoyen	(Russia) Elena Bovina (Croatia) Tereza Mrdeža	3–6, 3–6
Win	31.	23 April 2012	Caracas, Venezuela	Hard	(Argentina) María Irigoyen	(Paraguay) Verónica Cepede Royg (Venezuela) Adriana Pérez	6–4, 6–3
Loss	32.	22 June 2012	Montpellier, France	Clay	(Argentina) María Irigoyen	(France) Séverine Beltrame (France) Laura Thorpe	4–6, 6–4, [10–6]
Win	33.	28 June 2012	Périgueux, France	Clay	(Argentina) María Irigoyen	(Spain) Leticia Costas (Spain) Inés Ferrer Suárez	6–1, 6–2
Win	34.	6 July 2012	Versmold, Germany	Clay	(Argentina) María Irigoyen	(Romania) Elena Bogdan (Hungary) Réka Luca Jani	6–1, 6–4
Win	35.	28 July 2012	São José do Rio Preto, Brazil	Clay	(Argentina) María Irigoyen	(Argentina) Aranza Salut (Argentina) Carolina Zeballos	6–1, 7–6^{(7)}
Win	36.	6 September 2012	Mestre, Italy	Clay	(Argentina) María Irigoyen	(Hungary) Réka Luca Jani (Serbia) Teodora Mirčić	5–7, 6–4, [10–8]
Loss	37.	20 September 2012	Podgorica, Montenegro	Clay	(Argentina) María Irigoyen	(Italy) Nicole Clerico (Germany) Anna Zaja	4–6, 6–3, [11–9]
Win	38.	30 November 2012	Santiago, Chile	Clay	(Argentina) María Irigoyen	(Brazil) Paula Cristina Gonçalves (Brazil) Roxane Vaisemberg	6–4, 6–2
Loss	39.	31 May 2013	Maribor, Slovenia	Clay	(Argentina) María Irigoyen	(Poland) Paula Kania (Poland) Magda Linette	3–6, 0–6
Loss	40.	6 July 2013	São José do Rio Preto, Brazil	Clay	(Bolivia) María Fernanda Álvarez Terán	(Paraguay) Verónica Cepede Royg (Venezuela) Adriana Pérez	6–4, 4–6, [9–11]

== Team ==
=== Fed Cup participation ===
Outcome	Date	Edition	Opponent team	Surface	Partner	Opponents	Score
Winner	7 February 2010	2010 World Group II	Estonia	Hard (i)	(Argentina) María Irigoyen	(Estonia) Margit Rüütel (Estonia) Schutting	7–5, 6–4
