= Roxane Vaisemberg =

Brazilian tennis player (born 1989)

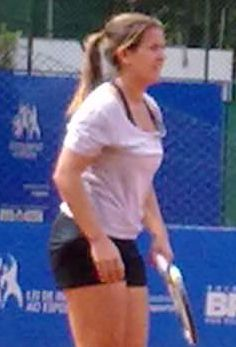
- Vaisemberg at the ITF São Paulo in 2013
- Country (sports): Brazil
- Residence: São Paulo
- Born: 25 July 1989 (age 35); São Paulo
- Height: 1.70 m (5 ft 7 in)
- Turned pro: 2004
- Retired: 2013
- Plays: Left (two-handed backhand)
- Prize money: $98,481

Singles
- Career record: 218–100
- Career titles: 14 ITF
- Highest ranking: No. 236 (8 August 2011)

Doubles
- Career record: 207–81
- Career titles: 21 ITF
- Highest ranking: No. 162 (10 December 2007)

Roxane Schcolnic Vaisemberg (born 25 July 1989) is a retired Brazilian tennis player. She reached a career-high singles ranking of world No. 236, on 8 August 2011, and a best doubles ranking of No. 162, on 10 December 2007.

== ITF Circuit finals ==
Legend
$100,000 tournaments
$75,000 tournaments
$50,000 tournaments
$25,000 tournaments
$10,000 tournaments

=== Singles: 20 (14–6) ===
Result	No.	Date	Tournament	Surface	Opponent	Score
Loss	1.	25 September 2004	ITF Santa Tecla, El Salvador	Clay	(Mexico) Melissa Torres Sandoval	2–6, 6–3, 5–7
Win	2.	13 August 2006	ITF Quito, Ecuador	Clay	(Argentina) Jessica Orselli	7–6^{(9)}, 6–2
Loss	3.	21 August 2006	ITF Guayaquil, Ecuador	Hard	(Uruguay) Estefanía Craciún	7–6^{(3)}, 3–6, 1–6
Win	4.	28 October 2006	ITF Luque, Paraguay	Clay	(Chile) Melisa Miranda	6–3, 6–3
Win	5.	6 September 2008	ITF Buenos Aires, Argentina	Clay	(Argentina) María Irigoyen	6–2, 7–5
Loss	6.	13 June 2009	ITF Santa Fe, Argentina	Clay	(Argentina) Emilia Yorio	2–6, 1–6
Win	7.	25 October 2009	ITF Belo Horizonte, Brazil	Clay	(Argentina) Veronica Spiegel	6–4, 4–6, 6–4
Win	8.	31 October 2009	ITF Fortaleza, Brazil	Clay	(Brazil) Vivian Segnini	6–4, 7–6^{(5)}
Loss	9.	6 June 2010	ITF São Paulo, Brazil	Clay	(Brazil) Nathalia Rossi	4–6, 3–6
Loss	10.	8 August 2010	ITF São Paulo	Clay	(South Africa) Chanel Simmonds	2–6, 6–3, 1–6
Win	11.	15 August 2010	ITF Itaparica, Brazil	Hard	(Brazil) Ana Clara Duarte	7–6^{(8)}, 6–3
Loss	12.	22 August 2010	ITF Itaparica, Brazil	Hard	(Brazil) Fernanda Hermenegildo	1–6, 7–6^{(5)}, 3–6
Win	13.	18 September 2010	ITF Itapema, Brazil	Clay	(Ecuador) Marie Elise Casares	6–0, 6–0
Win	14.	26 September 2010	ITF Mogi das Cruzes, Brazil	Clay	(Argentina) Carla Lucero	6–2, 6–3
Win	15.	17 October 2010	ITF São Paulo, Brazil	Clay	(Argentina) Catalina Pella	7–6^{(7)}, 4–6, 6–4
Win	16.	24 October 2010	ITF Santa Maria, Brazil	Clay	(Chile) Fernanda Brito	6–3, 6–4
Win	17.	28 May 2011	ITF Itaparica, Brazil	Hard	(Brazil) Vivian Segnini	6–0, 6–1
Win	18.	6 February 2012	ITF Bertioga, Brazil	Hard	(Peru) Bianca Botto	6–1, 6–1
Win	19.	30 July 2012	ITF São Paulo, Brazil	Hard	(Brazil) Ana Clara Duarte	6–4, 4–6, 7–6^{(7)}
Winner	20.	22 April 2013	ITF São Paulo, Brazil	Clay	(Paraguay) Montserrat González	6–4, 6–2

=== Doubles: 44 (21–23) ===
Outcome	No.	Date	Tournament	Surface	Partner	Opponents	Score
Winner	1.	16 October 2004	ITF Campo Grande, Brazil	Clay	(Ecuador) Estefania Balda Álvarez	(Uruguay) Estefanía Craciún (Russia) Ekaterina Dranets	6–1, 6–4
Winner	2.	15 May 2005	ITF Casale, Italy	Clay	(Brazil) Joana Cortez	(Hungary) Katalin Marosi (Italy) Gloria Pizzichini	6–2, 6–0
Winner	3.	7 November 2005	ITF São Paulo, Brazil	Hard	(Brazil) Ana Clara Duarte	(Brazil) Vanessa Menga (Brazil) Andrea Vieira	3–6, 7–5, 6–4
Winner	4.	13 August 2006	ITF Quito, Ecuador	Clay	(Brazil) Fabiana Mak	(Chile) Andrea Koch Benvenuto (Argentina) Jessica Orselli	6–2, 6–3
Winner	5.	27 August 2006	ITF Bogotá, Colombia	Clay	(Colombia) Karen Castiblanco	(Colombia) Mariana Duque (Colombia) Viky Núñez Fuentes	6–4, 7–6^{(4)}
Runner-up	6.	14 October 2006	Córdoba, Argentina	Clay	(Argentina) Tatiana Búa	(Argentina) Agustina Lepore (Argentina) Veronica Spiegel	5–7, 4–6
Winner	7.	21 October 2006	Santiago, Chile	Clay	(Argentina) Jessica Orselli	(Venezuela) Marina Giral Lores (Venezuela) Paola Iovino	6–4, 6–0
Runner-up	8.	11 May 2007	Antalya, Turkey	Hard	(United Kingdom) Anna Smith	(Germany) Korina Perkovic (Turkey) İpek Şenoğlu	6–7^{(1)}, 4–6
Runner-up	9.	25 May 2007	Fuerteventura, Spain	Carpet	(Colombia) Mariana Duque	(Portugal) Neuza Silva (Netherlands) Nicole Thijssen	1–6, 2–6
Winner	10.	17 June 2007	Marseille, France	Clay	(Belarus) Ksenia Milevskaya	(Argentina) Salome Llaguno (France) Nadege Vergos	6–2, 6–1
Winner	11.	4 August 2007	Campos do Jordão, Brazil	Hard	(Brazil) Joana Cortez	(Argentina) María José Argeri (Brazil) Letícia Sobral	7–5, 6–0
Winner	12.	18 August 2007	Bogotá, Colombia	Clay	(Brazil) Joana Cortez	(Brazil) Ana Clara Duarte (Brazil) Teliana Pereira	5–7, 6–4, 6–4
Runner-up	13.	29 September 2007	Juárez, Mexico	Clay	(Argentina) María Irigoyen	(Argentina) Andrea Benítez (Argentina) Soledad Esperón	3–6, 4–6
Runner-up	14.	6 October 2007	Monterrey, Mexico	Hard	(Portugal) Frederica Piedade	(Argentina) Florencia Molinero (Mexico) Melissa Torres Sandoval	1–6, 5–7
Runner-up	15.	25 November 2007	Sintra, Portugal	Clay	(Brazil) Joana Cortez	(Italy) Nicole Clerico (Brazil) Teliana Pereira	4–6, 2–6
Runner-up	16.	2 December 2007	Sintra, Portugal	Clay	(Portugal) Neuza Silva	(Belgium) Caroline Maes (Serbia) Teodora Mirčić	4–6, 1–6
Winner	17.	13 June 2008	Campobasso, Italy	Clay	(Argentina) María Irigoyen	(Italy) Nicole Clerico (Australia) Jessica Moore	6–3, 6–2
Winner	18.	3 August 2008	Campos do Jordão, Brazil	Hard	(Argentina) Mailen Auroux	(Argentina) Jorgelina Cravero (Argentina) María Irigoyen	6–3, 6–4
Winner	19.	30 August 2008	Buenos Aires, Argentina	Clay	(Argentina) Tatiana Búa	(Uruguay) Estefanía Craciún (Argentina) Veronica Spiegel	4–6, 7–5, [10–3]
Runner-up	20.	6 September 2008	Buenos Aires, Argentina	Clay	(Argentina) Mailen Auroux	(Uruguay) Estefania Craciún (Argentina) María Irigoyen	6–1, 1–6 [2–10]
Runner-up	21.	25 October 2008	Augusta, United States	Hard	(Argentina) Mailen Auroux	(Indonesia) Yayuk Basuki (Indonesia) Romana Tedjakusuma	3–6, 6–4, [5–10]
Runner-up	22.	9 November 2008	Auburn, United States	Hard	(Portugal) Frederica Piedade	(United States) Raquel Kops-Jones (United States) Abigail Spears	5–7, 1–6
Runner-up	23.	21 February 2009	Portimão, Portugal	Hard	(Brazil) Raquel Piltcher	(Russia) Diana Isaeva (Armenia) Liudmila Nikoyan	6–7^{(5)}, 3–6
Winner	24.	6 June 2009	Córdoba, Argentina	Clay	(Brazil) Raquel Piltcher	(Argentina) Tatiana Búa (Colombia) Karen Castiblanco	6–4, 6–3
Winner	25.	29 August 2009	Barueri, Brazil	Hard	(Brazil) Monique Albuquerque	(Argentina) Mailen Auroux (Brazil) Fernanda Hermenegildo	7–6^{(7)}, 7–5
Runner-up	26.	17 October 2009	Bauru, Brazil	Clay	(Brazil) Monique Albuquerque	(Argentina) Veronica Spiegel (Argentina) Emilia Yorio	4–6, 3–6
Winner	27.	24 October 2009	Belo Horizonte, Brazil	Clay	(Brazil) Monique Albuquerque	(Argentina) Veronica Spiegel (Argentina) Emilia Yorio	6–7^{(4)}, 6–1, [14–12]
Runner-up	28.	31 October 2009	Fortaleza, Brazil	Clay	(Brazil) Raquel Piltcher	(Brazil) Nathalia Rossi (Argentina) Emilia Yorio	6–1, 1–6, [6–10]
Runner-up	29.	21 November 2009	Asunción, Paraguay	Clay	(Brazil) Raquel Piltcher	(Argentina) Vanesa Furlanetto (Chile) Andrea Koch Benvenuto	4–6, 6–2, [5–10]
Winner	30.	6 June 2010	São Paulo, Brazil	Clay	(Canada) Ekaterina Shulaeva	(Brazil) Fernanda Faria (Brazil) Paula Cristina Gonçalves	6–3, 6–3
Runner-up	31.	23 July 2010	Brasília, Brazil	Hard	(Brazil) Monique Albuquerque	(Brazil) Ana Clara Duarte (Brazil) Fernanda Hermenegildo	2–6, 4–6
Runner-up	32.	31 July 2010	Campos do Jordão, Brazil	Hard	(Brazil) Monique Albuquerque	(Brazil) Fernanda Faria (Brazil) Paula Cristina Gonçalves	3–6, 2–6
Winner	33.	14 August 2010	Itaparica, Brazil	Hard	(Brazil) Ana Clara Duarte	(Brazil) Fernanda Hermenegildo (Brazil) Nathalia Rossi	6–2, 6–0
Winner	34.	21 August 2010	Itaparica, Brazil	Hard	(Brazil) Natasha Lotuffo	(Brazil) Julianna Barbosa Bacelar (Brazil) Beatriz Maria Martins Cecato	6–1, 6–2
Winner	35.	18 September 2010	Itapema, Brazil	Clay	(Brazil) Monique Albuquerque	(Brazil) Maria Fernanda Alves (Brazil) Natalia Cheng	6–3, 6–3
Runner-up	36.	23 October 2010	Santa Maria, Brazil	Clay	(Brazil) Natasha Lotuffo	(Paraguay) Verónica Cepede Royg (Brazil) Vivian Segnini	w/o
Runner-up	37.	27 May 2011	Itaparica, Brazil	Hard	(Brazil) Vivian Segnini	(Brazil) Monique Albuquerque (Argentina) Aranza Salut	6–3, 4–6, [11–9]
Runner-up	38.	9 July 2011	Biarritz, France	Clay	(Japan) Erika Sema	(Russia) Alexandra Panova (Poland) Urszula Radwańska	2–6, 1–6
Runner-up	39.	17 July 2011	Contrexéville, France	Clay	(Japan) Erika Sema	(Ukraine) Valentina Ivakhnenko (Ukraine) Kateryna Kozlova	6–2, 5–7, [10–12]
Runner-up	40.	30 July 2011	Campos do Jordão, Brazil	Hard	(Brazil) Maria Fernanda Alves	(Brazil) Fernanda Hermenegildo (Brazil) Teliana Pereira	6–3, 6–7^{(5)}, [9–11]
Winner	41.	23 October 2011	Rock Hill, United States	Hard	(Croatia) Maria Abramović	(United States) Madison Brengle (Venezuela) Gabriela Paz	3–6, 6–3, [10–5]
Runner-up	42.	16 July 2012	ITF Campos do Jordão, Brazil	Hard	(Brazil) Paula Cristina Gonçalves	(Australia) Monique Adamczak (Brazil) Maria Fernanda Alves	6–4, 3–6, [3–10]
Winner	43.	30 July 2012	ITF São Paulo, Brazil	Hard	(Brazil) Paula Cristina Gonçalves	(Argentina) Aranza Salut (Argentina) Carolina Zeballos	6–2, 6–2
Runner-up	44.	26 November 2012	ITF Santiago, Chile	Clay	(Brazil) Paula Cristina Gonçalves	(Argentina) Mailen Auroux (Argentina) María Irigoyen	4–6, 2–6
