= 2004 Fed Cup Americas Zone Group I – play-offs =

Tennis competition play-offs

The play-offs of the 2004 Fed Cup Americas Zone Group I were the final stages of the Group I Zonal Competition involving teams from the Americas. Using the positions determined in their pools, the nine teams faced off to determine their placing in the 2004 Fed Cup Americas Zone Group I, the top two countries of each pool played for first to fourth placings, while the bottom two of each pool competed for sixth to ninth. The teams that ended up placing first overall advanced to World Group play-offs, whilst those coming in eighth were relegated down to Group II for the next year.

Placing	Pool A	Pool B
1	Mexico	Canada
2	El Salvador	Brazil
3		Cuba
4	Colombia	Chile
5	Puerto Rico	Uruguay

== Promotion play-offs ==
The first and second placed teams of each pool were placed against each other in two head-to-head rounds. The winner of the rounds advanced to the World Group play-offs, where they would get a chance to advance to the World Group for next year.

=== Mexico vs. Brazil ===
Mexico
0
Porto Seguro, Bahia, Brazil
24 April 2004
Red clay (outdoors)

Brazil
2

			1	2	3
1	(Mexico) (Brazil)	Marcela Arroyo; Carla Tiene	1; 6	2; 6
2	(Mexico) (Brazil)	Daniela Múñoz Gallegos; Maria Fernanda Alves	0; 6	1; 6
3	(Mexico) (Brazil)	Marcela Arroyo / Daniela Múñoz Gallegos; Maria Fernanda Alves / Carla Tiene				not played

=== El Salvador vs. Canada ===
El Salvador
0
Porto Seguro, Bahia, Brazil
24 April 2004
Red clay (outdoors)

Canada
2

			1	2	3
1	(El Salvador) (Canada)	Miriam Cruz; Aleksandra Wozniak	0; 6	0; 6
2	(El Salvador) (Canada)	Liz Cruz; Marie-Ève Pelletier	2; 6	4; 6
3	(El Salvador) (Canada)	Liz Cruz / Miriam Cruz; Marie-Ève Pelletier / Aleksandra Wozniak				not played

== Fifth ==
As there were only four teams from Pool A compared to the five from Pool B, the third-placed team from Pool B (Cuba) had no equivalent to play against. Thus the Cubans were automatically awarded fifth place.

== Relegation play-offs ==
The last and second-to-last placed teams of each pool were placed against each other in two head-to-head rounds. The losing team of the rounds were relegated to Group II for next year.

=== Colombia vs. Uruguay ===
Colombia
0
Porto Seguro, Bahia, Brazil
24 April 2004
Red clay (outdoors)

Uruguay
2

			1	2	3
1	(Colombia) (Uruguay)	Gabriela Mejía Tenorio; María Eugenia Roca Recarey	4; 6	4; 6
2	(Colombia) (Uruguay)	Karen Castiblanco; Ana Lucía Migliarini de León	0; 6	1; 6
3	(Colombia) (Uruguay)	Karen Castiblanco / Gabriela Mejía Tenorio; Ana Lucía Migliarini de León / María Eugenia Roca Recarey				not played

=== Puerto Rico vs. Chile ===
Puerto Rico
2
Porto Seguro, Bahia, Brazil
24 April 2004
Red clay (outdoors)

Chile
1

			1	2	3
1	(Puerto Rico) (Chile)	María Calbetó; Valentina Castro	2; 6	1; 6
2	(Puerto Rico) (Chile)	Vilmarie Castellvi; Andrea Koch-Benvenuto	7; 5	6; 4
3	(Puerto Rico) (Chile)	Kristina Brandi / Vilmarie Castellvi; Valentina Castro / Andrea Koch-Benvenuto	6; 2	6; 1

== Final Placements ==
Placing	Teams
Promoted	Brazil
Promoted	Canada
Third	Mexico
Third	El Salvador
Fifth	Cuba
Sixth	Uruguay
Sixth	Puerto Rico
Relegated	Colombia
Relegated	Chile

- Brazil and Canada advanced to the World Group play-offs. The Brazilians were drawn against Croatia, but they were defeated 1–4. The Canadians were drawn against Switzerland, but they were also defeated 2–3. Both teams were thus relegated back to Group I for the next year.
- Colombia and Chile were relegated down to 2005 Fed Cup Americas Zone Group II, where they respectively placed second and first overall. Thus, they both achieved advancement back to Group I for 2006.

== See also ==
- Fed Cup structure
