= 2004 Fed Cup Americas Zone Group I – Pool A =

Group A of the 2004 Fed Cup Americas Zone Group I was one of two pools in the Americas Zone Group I of the 2004 Fed Cup. Four teams competed in a round robin competition, with the top two teams and the bottom two teams proceeding to their respective sections of the play-offs: the top teams play for advancement to the World Group play-offs, while the bottom teams face potential relegation to Group II.

		(Colombia) COL	(Mexico) MEX	(El Salvador) ESA	(Puerto Rico) PUR	RR; W–L	Set; W–L	Game; W–L	Standings
21	Colombia		0–3	2–0	2–1	1–2	4–14	61–102	3
30	Mexico	3–0		3–0	3–0	3–0	17–0	105–46	1
36	El Salvador	0–2	0–3		2–1	2–1	8–9	79–80	2
42	Puerto Rico	1–2	0–3	1–2		0–3	7–13	89–106	4

== Colombia vs. Mexico ==
Colombia
0
Porto Seguro, Bahia, Brazil
20 April 2004
Red clay (outdoors)

Mexico
3

			1	2	3
1	(Colombia) (Mexico)	Andrea Giraldo; Marcela Arroyo	2; 6	2; 6
2	(Colombia) (Mexico)	Karen Castiblanco; Daniela Múñoz Gallegos	3; 6	2; 6
3	(Colombia) (Mexico)	Karen Castiblanco / Andrea Giraldo; Melissa Torres Sandoval / Graciela Vélez	0; 6	2; 6

== El Salvador vs. Puerto Rico ==
El Salvador
2
Porto Seguro, Bahia, Brazil
20 April 2004
Red clay (outdoors)

Puerto Rico
1

			1	2	3
1	(El Salvador) (Puerto Rico)	Miriam Cruz; Bianca Gorbea	6; 1	6; 3
2	(El Salvador) (Puerto Rico)	Liz Cruz; Vilmarie Castellvi	2; 6	1; 6
3	(El Salvador) (Puerto Rico)	Liz Cruz / Marcela Rodezno; Vilmarie Castellvi / Bianca Gorbea	6^{5} 7^{7}	7^{7} 6^{4}	6; 4

== Colombia vs. Puerto Rico ==
Colombia
2
Porto Seguro, Bahia, Brazil
21 April 2004
Red clay (outdoors)

Puerto Rico
1

			1	2	3
1	(Colombia) (Puerto Rico)	Andrea Giraldo; María Calbetó	6; 6	3; 3	11; 9
2	(Colombia) (Puerto Rico)	Karen Castiblanco; Vilmarie Castellvi	3; 6	1; 6
3	(Colombia) (Puerto Rico)	Karen Castiblanco / Andrea Giraldo; María Calbetó / Vilmarie Castellvi	6; 3	5; 7	6; 3

== Mexico vs. El Salvador ==
Mexico
3
Porto Seguro, Bahia, Brazil
21 April 2004
Red clay (outdoors)

El Salvador
0

			1	2	3
1	(Mexico) (El Salvador)	Marcela Arroyo; Miriam Cruz	6; 4	6; 1
2	(Mexico) (El Salvador)	Daniela Múñoz Gallegos; Liz Cruz	7; 5	6; 2
3	(Mexico) (El Salvador)	Melissa Torres Sandoval / Graciela Vélez; Liz Cruz / Marcela Rodezno	6; 4	7; 5

== Colombia vs. El Salvador ==
Colombia
0
Porto Seguro, Bahia, Brazil
22 April 2004
Red clay (outdoors)

El Salvador
2

			1	2	3
1	(Colombia) (El Salvador)	Andrea Giraldo; Miriam Cruz	4; 6	1; 6
2	(Colombia) (El Salvador)	Karen Castiblanco; Liz Cruz	3; 6	1; 6
3	(Colombia) (El Salvador)	Karen Castiblanco / Gabriela Mejía Tenorio; Liz Cruz / Marcela Rodezno				not played

== Mexico vs. Puerto Rico ==
Mexico
3
Porto Seguro, Bahia, Brazil
22 April 2004
Red clay (outdoors)

Puerto Rico
0

			1	2	3
1	(Mexico) (Puerto Rico)	Melissa Torres Sandoval; Bianca Gorbea	6; 3	6; 1
2	(Mexico) (Puerto Rico)	Daniela Múñoz Gallegos; Vilmarie Castellvi	7^{7} 6^{2}	6; 2
3	(Mexico) (Puerto Rico)	Melissa Torres Sandoval / Graciela Vélez; Vilmarie Castellvi / Bianca Gorbea	6; 2			retired

== See also ==
- Fed Cup structure
