= 2004 Fed Cup Americas Zone Group I – Pool B =

Group B of the 2004 Fed Cup Americas Zone Group I was one of two pools in the Americas Zone Group I of the 2004 Fed Cup. Four teams competed in a round robin competition, with the top two teams and the bottom two teams proceeding to their respective sections of the play-offs: the top teams play for advancement to the World Group play-offs, while the bottom teams face potential relegation to Group II.

		(Canada) CAN	(Brazil) BRA	(Uruguay) URU	(Chile) CHI	(Cuba) CUB	RR; W–L	Set; W–L	Game; W–L	Standings
17	Canada		2–1	3–0	2–0	3–0	4–0	20–3	128–58	1
24	Brazil	1–2		2–0	3–0	3–0	3–1	18–5	127–74	2
40	Uruguay	0–3	0–2		2–1	2–1	0–4	7–20	87–139	5
45	Chile	0–2	0–3	1–2		2–1	1–3	7–19	82–133	4
46	Cuba	0–3	0–3	1–2	1–2		2–2	9–14	85–115	3

== Canada vs. Cuba ==
Canada
3
Porto Seguro, Bahia, Brazil
19 April 2004
Red clay (outdoors)

Cuba
0

			1	2	3
1	(Canada) (Cuba)	Aleksandra Wozniak; Yamile Fors Guerra	6; 2	6; 1
2	(Canada) (Cuba)	Marie-Ève Pelletier; Yanet Núñez Mojarena	6; 0	6; 3
3	(Canada) (Cuba)	Mélanie Marois / Marie-Ève Pelletier; Yamile Fors Guerra / Yanet Núñez Mojarena	6; 3	6; 2

== Uruguay vs. Chile ==
Uruguay
1
Porto Seguro, Bahia, Brazil
19 April 2004
Red clay (outdoors)

Chile
2

			1	2	3
1	(Uruguay) (Chile)	María Eugenia Roca Recarey; Valentina Castro	6; 4	3; 6	1; 6
2	(Uruguay) (Chile)	Ana Lucía Migliarini de León; Andrea Koch-Benvenuto	6; 3	6; 2
3	(Uruguay) (Chile)	Camila Belassi / Ana Lucía Migliarini de León; Valentina Castro / Andrea Koch-Benvenuto	6; 1	5; 7	1; 6

== Brazil vs. Uruguay ==
Brazil
3
Porto Seguro, Bahia, Brazil
20 April 2004
Red clay (outdoors)

Uruguay
0

			1	2	3
1	(Brazil) (Uruguay)	Carla Tiene; María Eugenia Roca Recarey	6; 2	6; 3
2	(Brazil) (Uruguay)	Maria Fernanda Alves; Ana Lucía Migliarini de León	6; 2	7^{8} 6^{6}
3	(Brazil) (Uruguay)	Maria Fernanda Alves / Carla Tiene; Camila Belassi / Ana Lucía Migliarini de León	6; 1	6; 1

== Chile vs. Cuba ==
Chile
1
Porto Seguro, Bahia, Brazil
20 April 2004
Red clay (outdoors)

Cuba
2

			1	2	3
1	(Chile) (Cuba)	Valentina Castro; Yamile Fors Guerra	5; 7	3; 6
2	(Chile) (Cuba)	Andrea Koch-Benvenuto; Yanet Núñez Mojarena	7; 5	0; 6	6; 0
3	(Chile) (Cuba)	Valentina Castro / Andrea Koch-Benvenuto; Yamile Fors Guerra / Yanet Núñez Mojarena	1; 6	1; 6

== Canada vs. Uruguay ==
Canada
3
Porto Seguro, Bahia, Brazil
21 April 2004
Red clay (outdoors)

Uruguay
0

			1	2	3
1	(Canada) (Uruguay)	Aleksandra Wozniak; Camila Belassi	6; 1	6; 1
2	(Canada) (Uruguay)	Marie-Ève Pelletier; Ana Lucía Migliarini de León	6; 4	4; 6	6; 3
3	(Canada) (Uruguay)	Mélanie Marois / Marie-Ève Pelletier; Camila Belassi / Ana Lucía Migliarini de León	6; 2	6; 1

== Brazil vs. Chile ==
Brazil
3
Porto Seguro, Bahia, Brazil
21 April 2004
Red clay (outdoors)

Chile
0

			1	2	3
1	(Brazil) (Chile)	Larissa Carvalho; Valentina Castro	2; 6	7; 5	6; 1
2	(Brazil) (Chile)	Maria Fernanda Alves; Andrea Koch-Benvenuto	6; 2	6; 1
3	(Brazil) (Chile)	Maria Fernanda Alves / Carla Tiene; Valentina Castro / Andrea Koch-Benvenuto	6; 2	6; 3

== Canada vs. Brazil ==
Canada
2
Porto Seguro, Bahia, Brazil
22 April 2004
Red clay (outdoors)

Brazil
1

			1	2	3
1	(Canada) (Brazil)	Aleksandra Wozniak; Carla Tiene	6; 3	6; 3
2	(Canada) (Brazil)	Marie-Ève Pelletier; Maria Fernanda Alves	6; 4	6; 3
3	(Canada) (Brazil)	Mélanie Marois / Marie-Ève Pelletier; Maria Fernanda Alves / Carla Tiene	2; 6	2; 6

== Uruguay vs. Cuba ==
Uruguay
1
Porto Seguro, Bahia, Brazil
22 April 2004
Red clay (outdoors)

Cuba
2

			1	2	3
1	(Uruguay) (Cuba)	María Eugenia Roca Recarey; Yamile Fors Guerra	3; 6	2; 6
2	(Uruguay) (Cuba)	Ana Lucía Migliarini de León; Yanet Núñez Mojarena	6; 1	6; 2
3	(Uruguay) (Cuba)	Camila Belassi / Ana Lucía Migliarini de León; Yamile Fors Guerra / Yanet Núñez Mojarena	2; 6	1; 6

== Canada vs. Chile ==
Canada
2
Porto Seguro, Bahia, Brazil
23 April 2004
Red clay (outdoors)

Chile
0

			1	2	3
1	(Canada) (Chile)	Aleksandra Wozniak; Valentina Castro	6; 3	6; 1
2	(Canada) (Chile)	Marie-Ève Pelletier; Andrea Koch-Benvenuto	6; 0	6; 0
3	(Canada) (Chile)	Marie-Ève Pelletier / Aleksandra Wozniak; Valentina Castro / Andrea Koch-Benvenuto				not played

== Brazil vs. Cuba ==
Brazil
2
Porto Seguro, Bahia, Brazil
23 April 2004
Red clay (outdoors)

Cuba
0

			1	2	3
1	(Brazil) (Cuba)	Carla Tiene; Yamile Fors Guerra	6; 3	6; 0
2	(Brazil) (Cuba)	Maria Fernanda Alves; Yanet Núñez Mojarena	6; 4	6; 4
3	(Brazil) (Cuba)	Maria Fernanda Alves / Carla Tiene; Yamile Fors Guerra / Yanet Núñez Mojarena				not played

== See also ==
- Fed Cup structure
