= Estefanía Craciún =

Uruguayan tennis player

- Country (sports): Uruguay
- Born: 1 January 1987 (age 38) Montevideo, Uruguay
- Retired: 2008
- Plays: Right-handed
- Prize money: $65,440

Singles
- Career record: 174–85
- Career titles: 9 ITF
- Highest ranking: No. 246 (25 June 2007)

Doubles
- Career record: 105–64
- Career titles: 10 ITF
- Highest ranking: No. 226 (25 February 2008)

Team competitions
- Fed Cup: 10–14

Estefanía Craciún (Latin American Spanish pronunciation: [estefaˈni.a kɾaˈsjun]; born 1 January 1987) is a former tennis player from Uruguay.

Craciún won nine singles and ten doubles titles on the ITF Women's Circuit. On 25 June 2007, she reached her best singles ranking of world No. 246. On 25 February 2008, she peaked at No. 226 in the doubles rankings.

Playing for Uruguay Fed Cup team, Craciún has a win–loss record of 10–14. She retired in 2008.

== ITF finals ==
=== Singles: 22 (9–13) ===
Legend $50,000 tournaments $25,000 tournaments $10,000 tournaments	Finals by surface Clay (5–9) Hard (4–4) Carpet (0–0)

Outcome	No.	Date	Tournament	Surface	Opponent	Score
Winner	1.	6 October 2003	ITF San Salvador, El Salvador	Clay	(Argentina) Soledad Esperón	7–6^{(1)}, 6–2
Runner-up	1.	11 October 2004	ITF Campo Grande, Brazil	Clay	(Brazil) Joana Cortez	1–6, 1–6
Runner-up	2.	5 September 2005	ITF Santiago, Chile	Clay	(Argentina) Natalia Garbellotto	2–6, 4–6
Runner-up	3.	19 September 2005	ITF Buenos Aires, Argentina	Clay	(Argentina) Natalia Garbellotto	4–6, 1–6
Winner	2.	3 October 2005	ITF Córdoba, Argentina	Clay	(Argentina) Jorgelina Cravero	6–4, 6–3
Runner-up	4.	10 October 2005	ITF San Miguel de Tucumán, Argentina	Clay	(Argentina) Jorgelina Cravero	1–6, 6–4, 4–6
Runner-up	5.	17 October 2005	ITF Asunción, Paraguay	Clay	(Argentina) Jorgelina Cravero	4–6, 6–7^{(7)}
Runner-up	6.	3 April 2006	ITF Coatzacoalcos, Mexico	Hard	(Argentina) Jorgelina Cravero	5–7, 1–6
Winner	3.	26 June 2006	ITF Córdoba, Argentina	Clay	(Argentina) Flavia Mignola	6–0, 6–2
Winner	4.	3 July 2006	ITF Valencia, Venezuela	Hard	(Argentina) María Irigoyen	7–5, 6–1
Runner-up	7.	10 July 2006	ITF Caracas, Venezuela	Hard	(United States) Amber Liu	3–6, 4–6
Winner	5.	14 August 2006	ITF Guayaquil, Ecuador	Hard	(Brazil) Roxane Vaisemberg	6–7^{(3)}, 6–3, 6–1
Runner-up	8.	18 September 2006	ITF Guadalajara, Mexico	Clay	(Argentina) Betina Jozami	3–6, 4–6
Runner-up	9.	25 September 2006	ITF Juárez, Mexico	Clay	(Argentina) Betina Jozami	1–6, 6–0, 2–6
Runner-up	10.	13 November 2006	ITF Florianópolis, Brazil	Clay	(Belgium) Yanina Wickmayer	1–6, 0–6
Runner-up	11.	19 March 2007	ITF Coatzacoalcos, Mexico	Hard (i)	(Argentina) Florencia Molinero	4–6, 3–6
Runner-up	12.	10 September 2007	ITF Tampico, Mexico	Hard	(Mexico) Valeria Pulido	1–6, 6–7^{(2)}
Winner	6.	17 September 2007	ITF Chihuahua, Mexico	Clay	(Ecuador) Hilda Zuleta Cabrera	6–4, 0–6, 6–4
Runner-up	13.	3 March 2008	ITF Sabadell, Spain	Clay	(Italy) Elisa Balsamo	3–6, 5–7
Winner	7.	20 October 2008	ITF Mexico City	Hard	(United States) Tarakaa Bertrand	6–1, 6–1
Winner	8.	27 October 2008	ITF Mexico City	Hard	(Poland) Karolina Kosińska	7–5, 7–5
Winner	9.	17 November 2008	ITF Montevideo, Uruguay	Clay	(Argentina) Aranza Salut	6–4, 3–6, 6–2

=== Doubles: 18 (10–8) ===
Legend $25,000 tournaments $10,000 tournaments	Finals by surface Clay (5–6) Hard (5–2)

Outcome	No.	Date	Tournament	Surface	Partner	Opponents	Score
Runner-up	1.	7 June 2004	ITF Pitești, Romania	Clay	(Argentina) Andrea Benítez	(Romania) Mihaela Buzărnescu (Romania) Gabriela Niculescu	4–6, 4–6
Runner-up	2.	5 July 2004	ITF Getxo, Spain	Clay	(Argentina) Andrea Benítez	(Spain) Anna Font Estrada (Spain) Carla Suárez Navarro	2–6, 3–6
Winner	1.	2 August 2004	ITF Vigo, Spain	Hard	(Argentina) Andrea Benítez	(Russia) Julia Efremova (Slovenia) Sandra Volk	7–5, 6–4
Winner	2.	23 August 2004	ITF Trecastagni, Italy	Hard	(Argentina) Andrea Benítez	(Czech Republic) Veronika Chvojková (Finland) Emma Laine	6–3, 3–6, 6–2
Runner-up	3.	11 October 2004	ITF Campo Grande, Brazil	Clay	(Russia) Ekaterina Dranets	(Ecuador) Estefania Balda Álvarez (Brazil) Roxane Vaisemberg	1–6, 4–6
Runner-up	4.	5 September 2005	ITF Santiago, Chile	Clay	(Argentina) Florencia Salvadores	(Slovakia) Dominika Diešková (United States) Courtney Nagle	1–6, 3–6
Runner-up	5.	3 July 2006	ITF Valencia, Venezuela	Hard	(Venezuela) Mariana Muci	(Cuba) Yamile Fors Guerra (Cuba) Yanet Núñez Mojarena	4–6, 4–6
Winner	3.	14 August 2006	ITF Guayaquil, Ecuador	Hard	(Venezuela) Mariana Muci	(Chile) Andrea Koch Benvenuto (Argentina) Jesica Orselli	3–6, 7–6^{(5)}, 6–3
Winner	4.	25 September 2006	ITF Juárez, Mexico	Clay	(Argentina) Betina Jozami	(Mexico) Erika Clarke (United States) Courtney Nagle	6–1, 6–1
Runner-up	6.	14 May 2007	ITF Palm Beach Gardens, United States	Clay	(Argentina) Betina Jozami	(Australia) Monique Adamczak (United States) Aleke Tsoubanos	5–7, 6–2, 3–6
Runner-up	7.	15 October 2007	ITF San Luis Potosí, Mexico	Hard	(Argentina) Betina Jozami	(Belgium) Debbrich Feys (South Africa) Chanelle Scheepers	1–6, 4–6
Winner	5.	4 February 2008	ITF Cali, Colombia	Clay	(Argentina) Mailen Auroux	(Austria) Melanie Klaffner (Belarus) Ksenia Milevskaya	6–1, 6–4
Winner	6.	25 February 2008	ITF Sant Boi de Llobregat, Spain	Clay	(Argentina) Mailen Auroux	(Italy) Elisa Balsamo (Italy) Valentina Sulpizio	6–1, 6–3
Runner-up	8.	25 August 2008	ITF Buenos Aires, Argentina	Clay	(Argentina) Verónica Spiegel	(Argentina) Tatiana Búa (Brazil) Roxane Vaisemberg	6–4, 5–7, [3–10]
Winner	7.	1 September 2008	ITF Buenos Aires, Argentina	Clay	(Argentina) María Irigoyen	(Argentina) Mailen Auroux (Brazil) Roxane Vaisemberg	1–6, 6–1, [10–2]
Winner	8.	20 October 2008	ITF Mexico City	Hard	(Argentina) María Irigoyen	(Mexico) Lorena Arias (Mexico) Angélica Chávez	6–3, 6–4
Winner	9.	27 October 2008	ITF Mexico City	Hard	(Argentina) María Irigoyen	(United States) Sabrina Capannolo (Slovakia) Dominika Diešková	6–4, 6–4
Winner	10.	17 November 2008	ITF Montevideo, Uruguay	Clay	(Argentina) Vanesa Furlanetto	(Argentina) Carla Beltrami (United States) Nataly Yoo	6–1, 6–3
