= Lorena Arias =

Mexican tennis player

- Full name: Lorena Ivette Arias Rodríguez
- Country (sports): Mexico
- Born: 25 January 1983 (age 42)
- Height: 5 ft 7 in (170 cm)
- Plays: Right-handed
- Prize money: $16,097

Singles
- Highest ranking: No. 684 (12 December 2005)

Doubles
- Career titles: 2 ITF
- Highest ranking: No. 294 (7 November 2005)

Lorena Ivette Arias Rodríguez (Note: In this Spanish name, the first or paternal surname is Arias and the second or maternal family name is Rodríguez.) (born 25 January 1983), known as Lorena Arias, is a Mexican former professional tennis player.

== Biography ==
Arias was born into a Mexico City family with a history in the sport of volleyball. Her father coached volleyball and her mother, María del Carmen, represented Mexico at the 1968 Summer Olympics.

Before joining the professional tour, Arias played four seasons of college tennis at Washington State. She is a three-time medalist for Mexico in the Summer Universiade, including the country's first ever tennis medal in 2003, partnering Erika Valdés in the women's doubles.

From 2004 to 2008, Arias competed on the professional tour, primarily on the ITF circuit. In 2005 she featured in the qualifying draws of WTA Tour tournaments in Acapulco and Bogota. She played doubles in two Fed Cup ties for Mexico in 2008, against Colombia and Canada.

== ITF circuit finals ==
=== Doubles: 14 (2–12) ===
$25,000 tournaments
$10,000 tournaments

Outcome	Date	Tournament	Surface	Partner	Opponents	Score
Runner-up	9 November 2004	Mexico City, Mexico	Hard	(Mexico) Erika Clarke	(Mexico) Marcela Arroyo (Mexico) Melissa Torres Sandoval	1–6, 6–3, 0–6
Runner-up	15 November 2004	Puebla, Mexico	Hard	(Mexico) Erika Clarke	(Mexico) Marcela Arroyo (Mexico) Melissa Torres Sandoval	6–2, 6–7^{(2)}, 0–6
Runner-up	8 May 2005	Ciudad Obregón, Mexico	Hard	(Mexico) Erika Clarke	(United States) Lauren Barnikow (United States) Kelly Schmandt	0–6, 2–6
Runner-up	10 May 2005	Los Mochis, Mexico	Clay	(Mexico) Erika Clarke	(Argentina) Jorgelina Cravero (Argentina) Flavia Mignola	3–6, 0–6
Runner-up	31 May 2005	Leon, Mexico	Hard	(Mexico) Erika Clarke	(Mexico) Daniela Múñoz Gallegos (Argentina) Andrea Benítez	5–7, 3–6
Runner-up	27 March 2007	Xalapa, Mexico	Hard	(Mexico) Erika Clarke	(Mexico) Daniela Múñoz Gallegos (Argentina) Andrea Benítez	4–6, 6–4, 1–6
Runner-up	23 April 2007	Ciudad Obregón, Mexico	Hard	(Mexico) Erika Clarke	(Mexico) Daniela Múñoz Gallegos (Mexico) Valeria Pulido	3–6, 6–3, 1–6
Runner-up	14 May 2007	Irapuato, Mexico	Hard	(Mexico) Erika Clarke	(United States) Courtney Nagle (United States) Robin Stephenson	1–6, 3–6
Runner-up	21 May 2007	Monterrey, Mexico	Hard	(Mexico) Erika Clarke	(Brazil) Maria Fernanda Alves (United States) Courtney Nagle	4–6, 4–6
Runner-up	12 September 2007	Tampico, Mexico	Hard	(Mexico) Erika Clarke	(United States) Catrina Thompson (United States) Christian Thompson	1–6, 4–6
Winner	1 December 2007	Mexico City, Mexico	Hard	(Mexico) Erika Clarke	(Bolivia) María Fernanda Álvarez Terán (Venezuela) Mariana Muci	6–4, 6–4
Runner-up	8 September 2008	Celaya, Mexico	Clay	(Mexico) Angélica Chávez	(Mexico) Daniela Múñoz Gallegos (Mexico) Erika Clarke	6–1, 1–6, 5–10
Winner	15 September 2008	Chihuahua, Mexico	Clay	(Colombia) Paula Zabala	(Mexico) Daniela Múñoz Gallegos (Mexico) Erika Clarke	2–6, 6–4, 10–5
Runner-up	20 October 2008	Mexico City, Mexico	Hard	(Mexico) Angélica Chávez	(Uruguay) Estefanía Craciún (Argentina) María Irigoyen	3–6, 4–6
