= María Rodríguez (volleyball) =

Mexican volleyball player

Personal information
- Full name: María del Carmen Rodríguez
- Born: 19 July 1946 (age 80); Mexico City, Mexico
- Height: 1.67 m (5 ft 6 in)

Volleyball information
- Number: 6
Honours
Women's volleyball
Representing Mexico
Pan American Games
Bronze medal – third place	1963 São Paulo	Team
Bronze medal – third place	1971 Cali	Team
Central American and Caribbean Games
Gold medal – first place	1970 Panama City	Team
Bronze medal – third place	1962 Kingston	Team

María del Carmen Rodríguez (born 19 July 1946) is a Mexican volleyball player. She competed in the women's tournament at the 1968 Summer Olympics. Her daughter Lorena was a professional tennis player.
