= Andrea Benítez (tennis) =

Argentine tennis player (born 1986)

- Country (sports): Argentina
- Born: 10 May 1986 (age 39) Formosa, Argentina
- Turned pro: 2002
- Retired: 2013
- Plays: Right-handed (one-handed backhand)
- Prize money: $85,674

Singles
- Career record: 241–141
- Career titles: 11 ITF
- Highest ranking: No. 251 (15 May 2006)

Doubles
- Career record: 204–101
- Career titles: 26 ITF
- Highest ranking: No. 269 (22 October 2007)

Andrea Benítez (Latin American Spanish: [anˈdɾea βeˈnites]; (Note: In isolation, Benítez is pronounced [beˈnites].) born 10 May 1986) is a retired Argentine tennis player.

Throughout her career, she won eleven singles titles and 26 doubles titles on the ITF Women's Circuit. Her best WTA singles ranking is 251, which she achieved on 15 May 2006. In doubles, her career-high ranking is 269, achieved on 22 October 2007.

Benítez made her WTA Tour main-draw debut at the 2006 Copa Colsanitas after coming through the qualifying rounds, partnering with Betina Jozami in the doubles event.

== ITF Circuit finals ==
$100,000 tournaments
$75,000 tournaments
$50,000 tournaments
$25,000 tournaments
$10,000 tournaments

=== Singles: 20 (11 titles, 9 runner-ups) ===
Result	Date	Tournament	Surface	Opponent	Score
Win	May 2004	ITF Mérida, Mexico	Hard	(Sweden) Maria Wolfbrandt	6–4, 6–3
Loss	Jun 2004	ITF Brașov, Romania	Clay	(Romania) Mihaela Buzărnescu	3–6, 5–7
Win	Aug 2004	ITF Trecastagni, Italy	Hard	(Czech Republic) Veronika Chvojková	6–4, 4–6, 6–3
Loss	Nov 2004	ITF Salta, Argentina	Clay	(Argentina) Soledad Esperón	3–6, 3–6
Win	May 2005	ITF Monterrey, Mexico	Hard	(Mexico) Daniela Múñoz Gallegos	w/o
Win	Jun 2005	ITF Santa Tecla, El Salvador	Clay	(Chile) Andrea Koch Benvenuto	6–3, 6–0
Win	Jul 2007	ITF Arad, Romania	Clay	(Argentina) Vanesa Furlanetto	3–6, 7–5, 6–3
Loss	Nov 2007	ITF Buenos Aires, Argentina	Clay	(Argentina) María Irigoyen	1–6, 1–6
Loss	May 2008	ITF Buenos Aires, Argentina	Clay	(Bolivia) María Fernanda Álvarez Terán	6–7^{(4)}, 6–0, 0–6
Win	Sep 2010	ITF Celaya, Mexico	Clay	(United States) Elizabeth Ferris	6–0, 1–1 ret.
Loss	Oct 2010	ITF Mexico City	Hard	(United States) Yasmin Schnack	3–6, 1–6
Loss	Mar 2011	ITF Concepción, Chile	Clay	(Bulgaria) Aleksandrina Naydenova	6–1, 4–6, 4–6
Win	Apr 2011	ITF Córdoba, Argentina	Hard	(Argentina) Catalina Pella	6–3, 6–3
Win	Apr 2011	ITF São Paulo, Brazil	Clay	(Germany) Karolina Nowak	7–6^{(4)}, 4–6, 6–2
Win	May 2011	ITF Itaparica Island, Brazil	Hard	(Argentina) Aranza Salut	6–2, 6–3
Win	May 2011	ITF Itaparica Island	Hard	(Argentina) Vanesa Furlanetto	6–2, 6–3
Win	Jun 2011	ITF Santos, Brazil	Clay	(Brazil) Carla Forte	6–0, 6–1
Loss	Oct 2012	ITF Asunción, Paraguay	Clay	(Brazil) Eduarda Piai	3–6, 6–7^{(6)}
Loss	Mar 2013	ITF Ribeirão Preto, Brazil	Clay	(Brazil) Beatriz Haddad Maia	6–7^{(2)}, 2–6
Loss	Nov 2013	ITF São Paulo, Brazil	Clay	(Brazil) Gabriela Cé	6–7^{(5)}, 5–7

=== Doubles: 45 (26 titles, 19 runner-ups) ===
Result	Date	Tier	Tournament	Surface	Partner	Opponents	Score
Loss	8 September 2003	10,000	ITF Santiago, Chile	Clay	(Argentina) Virginia Donda	(Argentina) María José Argeri (Brazil) Letícia Sobral	2–6, 2–6
Loss	3 May 2004	10,000	ITF Mérida, Mexico	Hard	(Argentina) Betina Jozami	(Mexico) Erika Clarke (Republic of Ireland) Anne Mall	5–7, 5–7
Loss	7 June 2004	10,000	ITF Pitești, Romania	Clay	(Uruguay) Estefanía Craciún	(Romania) Mihaela Buzărnescu (Romania) Gabriela Niculescu	4–6, 4–6
Loss	5 July 2004	10,000	ITF Getxo, Spain	Clay	(Uruguay) Estefanía Craciún	(Spain) Anna Font (Spain) Carla Suárez Navarro	2–6, 3–6
Win	2 August 2004	10,000	ITF Vigo, Spain	Hard	(Uruguay) Estefanía Craciún	(Russia) Julia Efremova (Slovenia) Sandra Volk	7–5, 6–4
Win	23 August 2004	10,000	ITF Trecastagni, Italy	Hard	(Uruguay) Estefanía Craciún	(Czech Republic) Veronika Chvojková (Finland) Emma Laine	6–3, 3–6, 6–2
Loss	11 April 2005	10,000	ITF Tampico, Mexico	Hard	(Argentina) Flavia Mignola	(France) Kildine Chevalier (Argentina) Jorgelina Cravero	6–7^{(6)}, 6–2, 5–7
Win	24 May 2005	10,000	ITF Leon, Mexico	Hard (i)	(Mexico) Daniela Múñoz Gallegos	(United States) Elizabeth Kaufman (Japan) Mari Tanaka	6–4, 1–6, 6–1
Win	31 May 2005	10,000	ITF Leon, Mexico	Hard	(Mexico) Daniela Múñoz Gallegos	(Mexico) Lorena Arias (Mexico) Erika Clarke	7–5, 6–3
Win	6 June 2005	10,000	ITF San Salvador, El Salvador	Clay	(Argentina) Flavia Mignola	(Argentina) Patricia Holzman (Chile) Andrea Koch Benvenuto	w/o
Loss	6 March 2007	10,000	ITF Toluca, Mexico	Hard (i)	(Argentina) María Irigoyen	(United States) Courtney Nagle (South Africa) Chanelle Scheepers	2–6, 6–1, 2–6
Win	27 March 2007	10,000	ITF Xalapa, Mexico	Hard	(Mexico) Daniela Múñoz Gallegos	(Mexico) Lorena Arias (Mexico) Erika Clarke	6–4, 4–6, 6–1
Win	30 April 2007	10,000	ITF Buenos Aires, Argentina	Clay	(Argentina) María Irigoyen	(Brazil) Nicole Buitoni (Brazil) Fernanda Hermenegildo	6–2, 6–2
Win	14 May 2007	10,000	ITF Córdoba, Argentina	Clay	(Argentina) María Irigoyen	(Colombia) Karen Castiblanco (Chile) Melisa Miranda	6–2, 6–4
Win	14 May 2007	10,000	ITF Córdoba, Argentina	Clay	(Argentina) María Irigoyen	(Argentina) Soledad Esperón (Argentina) Agustina Lepore	6–4, 2–6, 6–4
Win	13 July 2007	10,000	ITF Bucharest, Romania	Clay	(Argentina) María Irigoyen	(Spain) Melissa Carbera Handt (Spain) Carolina Gago Fuentes	7–6^{(10)}, 6–1
Win	20 July 2007	10,000	ITF Craiova, Romania	Clay	(Argentina) María Irigoyen	(Argentina) Mailen Auroux (Argentina) Vanesa Furlanetto	6–3, 6–4
Win	29 September 2007	25,000	ITF Juárez, Mexico	Clay	(Argentina) Soledad Esperón	(Argentina) María Irigoyen (Brazil) Roxane Vaisemberg	6–3, 6–4
Win	5 November 2007	10,000	ITF Córdoba, Argentina	Clay	(Argentina) Soledad Esperón	(Argentina) Agustina Lepore (Argentina) Veronica Spiegel	6–3, 6–3
Win	12 November 2007	10,000	ITF Buenos Aires, Argentina	Clay	(Argentina) Soledad Esperón	(Argentina) Agustina Lepore (Argentina) Veronica Spiegel	7–5, 7–6^{(3)}
Win	19 November 2007	10,000	ITF Buenos Aires, Argentina	Clay	(Argentina) Soledad Esperón	(Argentina) Agustina Lepore (Argentina) Veronica Spiegel	6–2, 0–6, [10–3]
Loss	23 August 2010	10,000	ITF San Luis Potosí, Mexico	Hard	(United States) Nadia Echeverría Alam	(United States) Macall Harkins (Austria) Nicole Rottmann	1–6, 4–6
Win	22 November 2010	10,000	ITF Asunción, Paraguay	Clay	(Argentina) Tatiana Búa	(Argentina) Lucía Jara Lozano (Argentina) Luciana Sarmenti	6–2, 6–4
Loss	14 February 2011	10,000	ITF Buenos Aires, Argentina	Clay	(Argentina) Tatiana Búa	(Paraguay) Verónica Cepede Royg (Argentina) Luciana Sarmenti	7–5, 3–6, [7–10]
Loss	7 March 2011	10,000	ITF Concepción, Chile	Clay	(Argentina) Barbara Rush	(United States) Alexandra Hirsch (United States) Amanda McDowell	4–6, 7–5, [8–10]
Win	21 March 2011	10,000	ITF Rancagua, Chile	Clay	(Brazil) Raquel Piltcher	(Chile) Belén Ludueña (Chile) Daniela Seguel	7–6^{(5)}, 6–1
Win	4 April 2011	10,000	ITF Córdoba, Argentina	Clay	(Argentina) Salome Llaguno	(Chile) Belén Ludueña (Chile) Daniela Seguel	6–0, 5–7, [10–3]
Win	11 April 2011	10,000	ITF Córdoba, Argentina	Hard	(Argentina) Tatiana Búa	(Argentina) Catalina Pella (Argentina) Luciana Sarmenti	6–3, 6–4
Loss	9 May 2011	10,000	ITF Itaparica Island, Brazil	Hard	(Brazil) Raquel Piltcher	(Chile) Daniela Seguel (Brazil) Nathália Rossi	6–3, 0–6, [7–10]
Loss	6 June 2011	10,000	ITF Santos, Brazil	Clay	(Brazil) Raquel Piltcher	(Brazil) Eduarda Piai (Brazil) Karina Venditti	4–6, 4–6
Loss	27 June 2011	10,000	ITF Havana, Cuba	Hard	(United States) Margaret Lumia	(Cuba) Misleydis Díaz González (Cuba) Yamile Fors Guerra	2–6, 2–6
Loss	18 July 2011	10,000	ITF Ribeirão Preto, Brazil	Clay	(Brazil) Raquel Piltcher	(Brazil) Fernanda Faria (Brazil) Paula Cristina Goncalves	6–2, 2–6, [6–10]
Loss	22 August 2011	10,000	ITF San Luis Potosí, Mexico	Hard	(United States) Margaret Lumia	(Russia) Nika Kukharchuk (United States) Lena Litvak	1–6, 4–6
Win	3 September 2012	10,000	ITF Buenos Aires, Argentina	Clay	(Chile) Camila Silva	(Argentina) Aranza Salut (Mexico) Ana Sofía Sánchez	6–3, 6–0
Loss	17 September 2012	10,000	ITF Villa Allende, Argentina	Clay	(Argentina) Luciana Sarmenti	(Argentina) Victoria Bosio (Argentina) Catalina Pella	6–7^{(6)}, 7–6^{(3)}, [7–10]
Loss	22 October 2012	10,000	ITF Luque, Paraguay	Clay	(Brazil) Raquel Piltcher	(United States) Anamika Bhargava (United States) Sylvia Krywacz	4–6, 2–6
Loss	29 October 2012	10,000	ITF Asunción, Paraguay	Clay	(Brazil) Raquel Piltcher	(United States) Anamika Bhargava (United States) Sylvia Krywacz	1–6, 4–6
Win	25 March 2013	10,000	ITF Ribeirão Preto, Brazil	Clay	(Brazil) Carla Forte	(Brazil) Eduarda Piai (Brazil) Karina Venditti	7–6^{(2)}, 6–1
Win	15 April 2013	10,000	ITF Antalya, Turkey	Hard	(Brazil) Carla Forte	(Romania) Irina Bara (Romania) Diana Buzean	6–2, 6–4
Win	22 April 2013	10,000	ITF Antalya	Hard	(Brazil) Carla Forte	(Belgium) Catherine Chantraine (Russia) Angelina Gabueva	6–1, 6–4
Win	29 April 2013	10,000	ITF Antalya	Hard	(Brazil) Carla Forte	(United States) Rosalia Alda (United States) Caitlin Whoriskey	4–6, 7–5, [10–4]
Loss	6 May 2013	10,000	ITF Antalya	Hard	(Brazil) Carla Forte	(Russia) Shakhlo Saidova (Ukraine) Anna Shkudun	6–4, 2–6, [8–10]
Loss	20 May 2013	10,000	ITF Antalya	Hard	(Brazil) Carla Forte	(China) Gai Ao (Turkey) Sultan Gönen	6–3, 5–7, [6–10]
Win	3 June 2013	10,000	ITF Santos, Brazil	Clay	(Brazil) Carla Forte	(Brazil) Ana Clara Duarte (Brazil) Nathaly Kurata	6–4, 6–1
Win	26 August 2013	10,000	ITF Antalya, Turkey	Clay	(Brazil) Carla Forte	(Finland) Emma Laine (United Kingdom) Melanie South	4–6, 6–3, [10–8]
