= Courtney Nagle =

American tennis player

- Country (sports): United States
- Born: September 29, 1982 (age 42)
- Turned pro: 2005
- Retired: 2012
- Plays: Right-handed (two-handed backhand)
- Prize money: US$46,599

Singles
- Career record: 51–60
- Career titles: 0
- Highest ranking: 541 (August 6, 2007)

Doubles
- Career record: 155–103
- Career titles: 0 WTA, 15 ITF
- Highest ranking: 97 (April 20, 2009)
- Last updated on: July 5, 2010.

Courtney Nagle (born September 29, 1982) is an American former professional tennis player. Her career high doubles ranking is No. 97, set on April 20, 2009. Her career high WTA singles ranking is No. 541, which she reached on August 6, 2007. Nagle retired from professional tennis 2012.

== ITF finals ==
=== Singles: 1 (0–1) ===
Finals by category $100,000 tournaments $75,000 tournaments $50,000 tournaments $25,000 tournaments $10,000 tournaments	Finals by surface Hard (0/1) Clay (0/0) Grass (0/0) Carpet (0/0)

Result	No.	Date	Tournament	Surface	Opponent	Score
Loss	1.	28 May 2007	Monterrey, Mexico	Hard	(United States) Irina Falconi	6–2, 3–6, 4–6

=== Doubles: 30 (15-15) ===
Finals by category $100,000 tournaments $75,000 tournaments $50,000 tournaments $25,000 tournaments $10,000 tournaments	Finals by surface Hard (11/12) Clay (2/3) Grass (1/0) Carpet (1/0)

Result	No.	Date	Tournament	Surface	Partner	Opponents	Score
Loss	1.	29 August 2005	Santa Cruz, Bolivia	Clay	(Slovakia) Dominika Diešková	(Chile) Andrea Koch Benvenuto (Argentina) Veronica Spiegel	3–6, 3–6
Win	2.	5 September 2005	Santiago, Chile	Clay	(Slovakia) Dominika Diešková	(Uruguay) Estefanía Craciún (Brazil) Florencia Salvadores	6–1, 6–3
Loss	3.	13 February 2006	San Cristobal, Mexico	Hard	(Mexico) Erika Clarke	(Argentina) María Irigoyen (Argentina) Flavia Mignola	2–1 ret
Loss	4.	16 May 2006	Obregón, Mexico	Hard	(Mexico) Erika Clarke	(Argentina) María Irigoyen (Argentina) Agustina Lepore	2–6, 1–6
Loss	5.	30 May 2006	León, Mexico	Hard	(Mexico) Erika Clarke	(Colombia) Mariana Duque Mariño (Colombia) Viky Núñez Fuentes	6–7, 6–7
Win	6.	4 July 2006	South Lake, United States	Hard	(Slovakia) Dominika Diešková	(Norway) Nina Munch-Søgaard (United States) Ashley Weinhold	2–6, 7–6, 6–3
Loss	7.	31 July 2006	Vancouver, Canada	Hard	(United States) Jennifer Magley	(Australia) Nicole Kriz (United States) Story Tweedie-Yates	5–7, 3–6
Loss	8.	11 September 2006	Tampico, Mexico	Hard	(Mexico) Erika Clarke	(Argentina) Betina Jozami (Mexico) Daniela Múñoz Gallegos	W\O
Loss	9.	25 September 2006	Juárez, Mexico	Clay	(Mexico) Erika Clarke	(Argentina) Betina Jozami (Uruguay) Estefanía Craciún	1–6, 1–6
Win	10.	6 March 2007	Toluca, Mexico	Hard	(South Africa) Chanelle Scheepers	(Argentina) María Irigoyen (Argentina) Andrea Benítez	6–2, 1–6, 6–2
Win	11.	7 May 2007	Mazatlán, Mexico	Hard	(United States) Robin Stephenson	(Mexico) Valeria Pulido (Mexico) Daniela Múñoz Gallegos	7–5, 6–4
Win	12.	14 May 2007	Irapuato, Mexico	Hard	(United States) Robin Stephenson	(Mexico) Lorena Arias (Mexico) Erika Clarke	6–1, 6–3
Win	13.	21 May 2007	Monterrey, Mexico	Hard	(Brazil) Maria Fernanda Alves	(Mexico) Lorena Arias (Mexico) Erika Clarke	6–4, 6–4
Loss	14.	28 May 2007	Monterrey, Mexico	Hard	(Slovakia) Dominika Diešková	(Mexico) Valeria Pulido (Mexico) Daniela Múñoz Gallegos	3–6, 6–0, 3–6
Win	15.	19 June 2007	Fort Worth, United States	Hard	(Slovakia) Dominika Diešková	(South Africa) Surina De Beer (United States) Robin Stephenson	7–5, 6–3
Loss	16.	26 June 2007	Edmond, United States	Hard	(Slovakia) Dominika Diešková	(Puerto Rico) Vilmarie Castellvi (United States) Kim Anh Nguyen	5–7, 6–1, 2–6
Win	17.	8 October 2007	Rockhampton, Australia	Hard	(United States) Robin Stephenson	(Australia) Alison Bai (Australia) Jessica Moore	6–4, 6–3
Win	18.	15 October 2007	Gympie, Australia	Hard	(United States) Robin Stephenson	(Australia) Monique Adamczak (United Kingdom) Jade Curtis	6–4, 6–1
Loss	19.	22 October 2007	Traralgon, Australia	Hard	(United States) Robin Stephenson	(Japan) Erika Sema (Japan) Yurika Sema	2–6, 2–6
Winner	20.	9 November 2007	Port Pirie, Australia	Hard	(United Kingdom) Sarah Borwell	(Australia) Daniella Dominikovic (Australia) Emily Hewson	6–2, 6–2
Win	21.	24 March 2008	Jersey, United Kingdom	Hard (i)	(United States) Robin Stephenson	(France) Yulia Fedossova (France) Violette Huck	6–3, 6–3
Winner	22.	12 July 2008	Felixstowe, Great Britain	Grass	(United Kingdom) Sarah Borwell	(Czech Republic) Nikola Fraňková (United Kingdom) Anna Hawkins	7–5, 6–3
Loss	23.	28 September 2008	Shrewsbury, Great Britain	Hard	(United Kingdom) Sarah Borwell	(United Kingdom) Anna Smith (Sweden) Johanna Larsson	6–7^{(6–8)}, 4–6
Winner	24.	23 November 2008	Odense, Denmark	Carpet	(United Kingdom) Sarah Borwell	(Czech Republic) Gabriela Chmelinová (Bosnia and Herzegovina) Mervana Jugić-Salkić	6–4, 6–4
Win	25.	2 February 2009	Rancho Mirage, United States	Hard	(South Africa) Natalie Grandin	(Russia) Alina Jidkova (Belarus) Darya Kustova	6–2, 7–6
Loss	26.	February 21, 2010	Surprise, United States	Hard	(United States) Christina Fusano	(China) Chun-Mei Ji (China) Xu Yifan	7–5, 2–6 [5–10]
Loss	27.	March 8, 2010	Hammond, United States	Hard	(United States) Christina Fusano	(China) Yi-Miao Zhou (China) Xu Yifan	2–6, 2–6
Loss	28.	March 20, 2010	Fort Walton Beach, United States	Hard	(United States) Christina Fusano	(Sweden) Johanna Larsson (South Africa) Chanelle Scheepers	6–2, 6–7^{(4)} [7–10]
Win	29.	May 9, 2010	Indian Harbour Beach, United States	Clay	(United States) Christina Fusano	(United States) Julie Ditty (United States) Carly Gullickson	6–3, 7–6
Loss	30.	May 29, 2010	Carson, United States	Clay	(United States) Christina Fusano	(United States) Lindsay Lee-Waters (United States) Megan Moulton-Levy	1–6, 2–6
