= Natalia Garbellotto =

Argentine tennis player

- Country (sports): Argentina
- Born: 1 February 1984 (age 41); Buenos Aires, Argentina
- Plays: Right-handed (two-handed backhand)
- Prize money: $26,204

Singles
- Career record: 101–39
- Career titles: 7 ITF
- Highest ranking: No. 303 (11 October 2004)

Doubles
- Career record: 27–22
- Career titles: 1 ITF
- Highest ranking: No. 619 (23 August 2004)

Natalia Garbellotto (born 1 February 1984) is a former professional tennis player from Argentina.

== Biography ==
Garbellotto, who was born in Buenos Aires, spent her career on the ITF Circuit. She won seven singles titles and reached a best ranking of 303 in the world.

A right-handed player, Garbellotto represented Argentina at the 2003 Pan American Games in Santo Domingo and in the same year played in a Fed Cup World Group tie for Argentina against Slovenia. In an understrength Argentine Fed Cup side, she was called upon to play the second singles rubber, which she lost to Katarina Srebotnik.

== ITF Circuit finals ==
Legend
$25,000 tournaments
$10,000 tournaments

=== Singles (7–2) ===
Result	No.	Date	Tournament	Surface	Opponent	Score
Loss	1.	1 May 2000	ITF Itajaí, Brazil	Hard	(Argentina) Jorgelina Cravero	3–6, 3–6
Win	1.	6 April 2003	ITF Makarska, Croatia	Clay	(Croatia) Matea Mezak	7–6^{(5)}, 7–5
Win	2.	23 November 2003	ITF Florianópolis, Brazil	Clay	(Brazil) Carla Tiene	6–2, 6–4
Loss	2.	28 March 2004	ITF Monterrey, Mexico	Hard	(United States) Alexandra Mueller	7–5, 1–6, 4–6
Win	3.	18 April 2004	ITF Morelia, Mexico	Hard	(Turkey) İpek Şenoğlu	6–4, 4–6, 6–4
Win	4.	5 September 2004	ITF Mollerussa, Spain	Hard	(Spain) Lucía Jiménez	6–0, 6–2
Win	5.	27 August 2005	ITF Buenos Aires, Argentina	Clay	(Uruguay) Estefanía Craciún	6–4, 6–1
Win	6.	4 September 2005	ITF Santa Cruz, Bolivia	Clay	(Brazil) Jenifer Widjaja	6–7^{(1)}, 6–3, 6–3
Win	7.	11 September 2005	ITF Santiago, Chile	Clay	(Uruguay) Estefanía Craciún	6–2, 6–4

=== Doubles (1–0) ===
Result	No.	Date	Tournament	Surface	Partner	Opponents	Score
Win	1.	10 August 2004	ITF Coimbra, Portugal	Hard	(Spain) Gabriela Velasco Andreu	(Italy) Alice Balducci (Slovenia) Maša Zec Peškirič	6–4, 6–1

== See also ==
- List of Argentina Fed Cup team representatives
