= Lauren Barnikow =

American tennis player

- Country (sports): United States
- Born: May 21, 1982 (age 43)
- Height: 5 ft 6 in (168 cm)
- Plays: Right-handed
- Prize money: $25,519

Singles
- Career titles: 0 WTA / 1 ITF
- Highest ranking: No. 418 (November 21, 2005)

Doubles
- Career titles: 0 WTA / 4 ITF
- Highest ranking: No. 200 (July 10, 2006)

Lauren Barnikow (born May 21, 1982) is an American former professional tennis player.

Barnikow, a New Jersey native, was a student at Woodbridge High School.

In 2000 she reached the singles final of the Easter Bowl and was champion in the doubles. She was a junior doubles finalist at the 2000 Australian Open (with Erin Burdette).

A collegiate player for Stanford University, Barnikow was a member of the 2001, 2002, 2004 NCAA Division I championship teams, as well as a six-time All-American.

Barnikow attained best world rankings of 418 for singles and 200 for doubles, with five ITF title wins. She featured in a WTA Tour main draw for the only time in 2005, narrowly losing in the first round of the doubles in Quebec City.

== ITF circuit finals ==
Legend
$25,000 tournaments
$10,000 tournaments

=== Singles: 3 (1–2) ===
Result	No.	Date	Tournament	Surface	Opponent	Score
Win	1.	Apr 2005	Tampico, Mexico	Hard	(France) Kildine Chevalier	6–3, 6–3
Loss	1.	May 2005	Ciudad Obregón, Mexico	Hard	(Mexico) Daniela Múñoz Gallegos	6–7^{(5)}, 6–2, 0–6
Loss	2.	May 2005	Mazatlán, Mexico	Hard	(Russia) Anna Bastrikova	4–6, 6–7^{(4)}

=== Doubles: 9 (4–5) ===
Result	No.	Date	Tournament	Surface	Partner	Opponents	Score
Win	1.	Jun 2000	Springfield, U.S.	Hard	(United States) Erin Burdette	(United States) Elizabeth Schmidt (United States) Abigail Spears	3–6 6–3 7–6^{(2)}
Win	2.	Aug 2004	Mexico City, Mexico	Hard	(Ecuador) Mariana Correa	(Mexico) Melissa Torres Sandoval (Mexico) Marcela Arroyo	7–6^{(7)}, 7–5
Win	3.	May 2005	Ciudad Obregón, Mexico	Hard	(United States) Kelly Schmandt	(Mexico) Lorena Arias (Mexico) Erika Clarke	6–0, 6–2
Loss	1.	May 2005	Mazatlán, Mexico	Hard	(United States) Kelly Schmandt	(Argentina) Flavia Mignola (Argentina) Jorgelina Cravero	4–6, 3–6
Loss	2.	Jul 2005	Hamilton, Canada	Clay	(Australia) Lauren Breadmore	(Japan) Junri Namigata (Japan) Kumiko Iijima	7–6^{(4)}, 2–6, 2–6
Loss	3.	Jul 2005	St Joseph, USA	Hard	(United States) Raquel Kops-Jones	(Indonesia) Romana Tedjakusuma (Indonesia) Wynne Prakusya	2–6, 3–6
Loss	4.	Aug 2005	Vancouver, Canada	Hard	(Germany) Antonia Matic	(United Kingdom) Sarah Borwell (United States) Sarah Riske	4–6, 6–3, 6–7^{(0)}
Loss	5.	Nov 2005	Toronto, Canada	Hard	(United States) Kristen Schlukebir	(Ukraine) Olena Antypina (Germany) Martina Müller	3–6, 1–6
Win	4.	Feb 2006	Taupō, New Zealand	Hard	(United States) Christina Fusano	(New Zealand) Leanne Baker (Italy) Francesca Lubiani	6–4, 6–4
