= Soledad Esperón =

Argentine tennis player

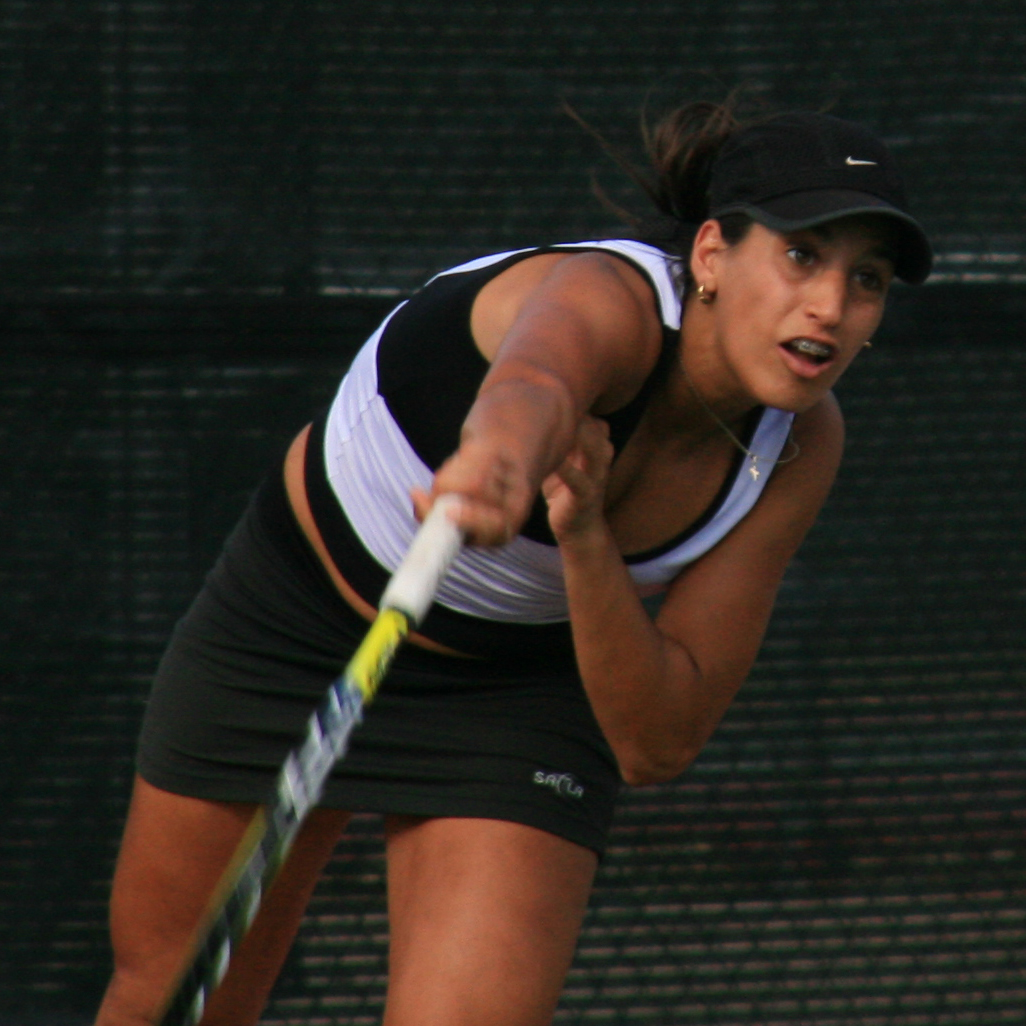
- Esperon at the Coleman Vision Tennis Championship in Albuquerque, New Mexico.
- Country (sports): Argentina
- Residence: Buenos Aires, Argentina
- Born: 8 February 1985 (age 41) Buenos Aires
- Turned pro: 2000
- Retired: 2016
- Plays: Right (two-handed backhand)
- Prize money: $136,166

Singles
- Career record: 226–153
- Career titles: 10 ITF
- Highest ranking: No. 166 (23 March 2009)

Grand Slam singles results
- Wimbledon: Q1 (2008)
- US Open: Q2 (2008)

Doubles
- Career record: 225–121
- Career titles: 25 ITF
- Highest ranking: No. 139 (2 October 2006)

Soledad Esperón (Spanish pronunciation: [soleˈðað espeˈɾon]; born 8 February 1985) is an Argentine former tennis player.

She won ten singles and 25 doubles titles on the ITF Women's Circuit in her career. Her highest WTA singles ranking is 166, which she reached on 23 March 2009. Her career high in doubles is world No.139, set on 2 October 2006.

Esperón made her WTA Tour main-draw debut at the 2009 Copa Sony Ericsson Colsanitas in the doubles event partnering Tamaryn Hendler.

Partnering Monique Adamczak, Esperón won her first $75k tournament in April 2006 at the Hardee's Pro Classic, defeating Edina Gallovits and Varvara Lepchenko in the final.

== ITF finals ==
=== Singles: 17 (10–7) ===
Legend $25,000 tournaments $10,000 tournaments	Finals by surface Hard (2–3) Clay (8–4)

Result	Date	Tournament	Surface	Opponent	Score
Win	14 July 2003	Puerto Ordaz, Venezuela	Hard	(Argentina) Micaela Moran	6–3, 6–1
Loss	6 October 2003	San Salvador, El Salvador	Clay	(Uruguay) Estefanía Craciún	6–7^{(1–7)}, 2–6
Win	13 October 2003	Santo Domingo, Dominican Republic	Hard	(Argentina) Flavia Mignola	6–1, 6–1
Win	20 June 2004	Mont-Tremblant, Canada	Clay	(Canada) Stéphanie Dubois	6–3, 6–4
Loss	9 August 2004	Caracas, Venezuela	Hard	(Argentina) María José Argeri	4–6, 2–6
Loss	16 August 2004	Guayaquil, Ecuador	Hard	(Brazil) Jenifer Widjaja	3–6, 2–6
Win	1 November 2004	Salta, Argentina	Clay	(Argentina) Andrea Benítez	6–3, 6–3
Win	2 October 2005	Pelham, United States	Clay	(Canada) Aleksandra Wozniak	7–5, 6–2
Loss	19 May 2007	Córdoba, Argentina	Clay	(Argentina) Florencia Molinero	0–6, 2–6
Win	21 May 2007	Córdoba, Argentina	Clay	(Argentina) Vanina García Sokol	6–2, 3–3 ret.
Loss	30 September 2007	Puerto Juárez, Mexico	Clay	(Colombia) Mariana Duque	3–6, 5–7
Win	5 November 2007	Córdoba, Argentina	Clay	(Argentina) Agustina Lepore	6–1, 6–4
Win	26 November 2007	Santiago, Chile	Clay	(Argentina) Verónica Spiegel	6–3, 6–0
Win	7 April 2008	Jackson, United States	Clay	(Ukraine) Tetiana Luzhanska	6–7^{(3–7)}, 6–2, 6–1
Win	20 April 2008	Palm Beach Gardens, United States	Clay	(Bulgaria) Sesil Karatantcheva	6–4, 6–1
Loss	28 April 2008	Coatzacoalcos, Mexico	Hard	(Argentina) Agustina Lepore	4–6, 4–6
Loss	13 October 2008	Mexico City	Hard	(Spain) Arantxa Parra Santonja	2–6, 2–6

=== Doubles: 43 (25–18) ===
Legend $100,000 tournaments $75,000 tournaments $50,000 tournaments $25,000 tournaments $10,000 tournaments	Finals by surface Hard (9–10) Clay (16–8) Grass (0–0) Carpet (0–0)

Result	Date	Tournament	Surface	Partner	Opponents	Score
Loss	25 August 2002	Santiago, Chile	Clay	(Brazil) Larissa Carvalho	(Argentina) Bruna Colósio (Argentina) Celeste Contín	w/o
Win	23 June 2003	Victoria, Mexico	Hard	(Argentina) Flavia Mignola	(Brazil) Maria Fernanda Alves (Brazil) Carla Tiene	5–7, 7–6^{(7–3)}, 7–5
Win	20 July 2003	Puerto Ordaz, Venezuela	Hard	(Argentina) Flavia Mignola	(Argentina) Virginia Donda (Argentina) Betina Jozami	6–4, 6–4
Loss	28 July 2003	Manta, Ecuador	Hard	(Argentina) Flavia Mignola	(Colombia) Maryori Franco (Ukraine) Olena Tsutskova	6–3, 3–6, 5–7
Win	6 October 2003	San Salvador, El Salvador	Clay	(Argentina) Flavia Mignola	(El Salvador) Liz Cruz (El Salvador) Marcela Rodezno	6–4, 2–6, 6–2
Loss	13 October 2003	Santo Domingo, Dominican Republic	Hard	(Argentina) Flavia Mignola	(Spain) Julia Gandia (Spain) Gabriela Velasco Andreu	3–6, 6–4, 5–7
Loss	19 October 2003	Valencia, Venezuela	Hard	(Argentina) Flavia Mignola	(Czech Republic) Zuzana Černá (Czech Republic) Eva Hrdinová	3–6, 6–4, 1–6
Win	3 November 2003	Los Mochis, Mexico	Clay	(Argentina) Flavia Mignola	(Uruguay) Ana Lucía Migliarini de León (Mexico) Daniela Múñoz Gallegos	6–2, 6–1
Loss	8 February 2004	Algarve, Portugal	Clay	(Argentina) Flavia Mignola	(France) Kildine Chevalier (Portugal) Frederica Piedade	6–2, 3–6, 4–6
Win	22 February 2004	Portimão, Portugal	Hard	(Argentina) Flavia Mignola	(France) Florence Haring (France) Alexandra Mayrat	6–1, 6–1
Win	30 March 2004	Obregón, Mexico	Hard	(Argentina) Flavia Mignola	(Venezuela) Stephanie Schaer (Japan) Ayami Takase	2–6, 6–4, 6–4
Win	26 April 2004	Coatzacoalcos, Mexico	Hard	(Argentina) Flavia Mignola	(Spain) Laura Pous Tió (Spain) Lourdes Domínguez Lino	6–0, 6–1
Win	7 June 2004	Hamilton, Canada	Clay	(Argentina) Flavia Mignola	(United States) Kaysie Smashey (Canada) Aneta Soukup	7–6^{(7–4)}, 3–6, 6–4
Win	20 June 2004	Mont-Tremblant, Canada	Clay	(Argentina) Flavia Mignola	(United States) Kaysie Smashey (Canada) Aneta Soukup	6–0, 2–6, 7–6^{(8–6)}
Win	1 November 2004	Salta, Argentina	Clay	(Argentina) Jorgelina Cravero	(Argentina) Belen Corbalan (Argentina) Luciana Sarmenti	6–2, 6–1
Win	22 May 2005	Caserta, Italy	Clay	(Czech Republic) Olga Vymetálková	(Croatia) Ivana Lisjak (Croatia) Nadja Pavić	7–5, 7–5
Loss	4 October 2005	Juárez, Mexico	Clay	(Czech Republic) Olga Vymetálková	(Argentina) María José Argeri (Brazil) Letícia Sobral	6–7^{(1–7)}, 3–6
Loss	11 October 2005	Victoria, Mexico	Hard	(Italy) Valentina Sassi	(Argentina) María José Argeri (Brazil) Letícia Sobral	3–6, 4–6
Loss	18 October 2005	Mexico City	Hard	(Republic of Ireland) Kelly Liggan	(Argentina) María José Argeri (Brazil) Letícia Sobral	6–7^{(2–7)}, 6–2, 0–6
Win	25 October 2005	Mexico City	Hard	(Republic of Ireland) Kelly Liggan	(Cuba) Yamile Fors Guerra (Cuba) Yanet Núñez Mojarena	1–6, 6–4, 6–3
Win	23 April 2006	Dothan, United States	Clay	(Australia) Monique Adamczak	(Romania) Edina Gallovits (Uzbekistan) Varvara Lepchenko	6–4, 3–6, 4–6
Win	12 June 2006	Gorizia, Italy	Clay	(South Africa) Chanelle Scheepers	(Spain) Matilde Muñoz Gonzalves (Spain) Sílvia Soler Espinosa	6–4, 6–3
Loss	9 July 2006	Valladolid, Spain	Hard	(Australia) Monique Adamczak	(Czech Republic) Veronika Chvojková (Ukraine) Yana Levchenko	1–6, 6–7^{(11–13)}
Loss	23 July 2006	Hamilton, Canada	Clay	(Canada) Aleksandra Wozniak	(Australia) Nicole Kriz (United States) Story Tweedie-Yates	4–6, 1–6
Loss	30 July 2006	Santa Cruz, Bolivia	Clay	(Brazil) Carla Tiene	(Brazil) Joana Cortez (Argentina) Jorgelina Cravero	2–6, 6–4, 4–6
Win	11 May 2007	Córdoba, Argentina	Clay	(Argentina) Agustina Lepore	(Argentina) Florencia Molinero (Argentina) Luciana Sarmenti	6–1, 6–2
Loss	21 May 2007	Córdoba, Argentina	Clay	(Argentina) Agustina Lepore	(Argentina) Andrea Benítez (Argentina) María Irigoyen	4–6, 6–2, 4–6
Loss	23 July 2007	Calgary, Canada	Hard	(Argentina) Agustina Lepore	(United Kingdom) Anna Fitzpatrick (Montenegro) Ana Veselinović	4–6, 3–6
Loss	4 August 2007	Vancouver Open, Canada	Hard	(Argentina) Agustina Lepore	(Canada) Stéphanie Dubois (Canada) Marie-Ève Pelletier	4–6, 4–6
Win	27 August 2007	Santa Cruz, Bolivia	Clay	(Argentina) María Irigoyen	(Bolivia) María Fernanda Álvarez Terán (Peru) Claudia Razzeto	6–2, 6–2
Loss	3 September 2007	Barueri, Brazil	Hard	(Argentina) María Irigoyen	(Brazil) Fabiana Chiaparini (Brazil) Letícia Sobral	7–6^{(7–4)}, 4–6, [9–11]
Win	10 September 2007	Santo Andre, Brazil	Hard	(Argentina) María Irigoyen	(Brazil) Larissa Carvalho (Brazil) Carla Tiene	4–6, 6–2, [10–7]
Win	29 September 2007	Juárez, Mexico	Clay	(Argentina) Andrea Benítez	(Argentina) María Irigoyen (Brazil) Roxane Vaisemberg	6–3, 6–4
Win	13 October 2007	Saltillo, Mexico	Hard	(South Africa) Chanelle Scheepers	(Belgium) Debbrich Feys (Netherlands) Leonie Mekel	6–0, 6–4
Win	5 November 2007	Córdoba, Argentina	Clay	(Argentina) Andrea Benítez	(Argentina) Agustina Lepore (Argentina) Veronica Spiegel	6–3, 6–3
Win	12 November 2007	Buenos Aires, Argentina	Clay	(Argentina) Andrea Benítez	(Argentina) Agustina Lepore (Argentina) Veronica Spiegel	7–5, 7–6^{(7–3)}
Win	19 November 2007	Buenos Aires, Argentina	Clay	(Argentina) Andrea Benítez	(Argentina) Agustina Lepore (Argentina) Veronica Spiegel	6–2, 0–6, [10–3]
Win	26 November 2007	Santiago, Chile	Clay	(Chile) Andrea Koch Benvenuto	(Argentina) Salome Llaguno (Argentina) Veronica Spiegel	6–3, 2–6, [10–8]
Win	13 January 2008	St. Leo, United States	Hard	(Portugal) Frederica Piedade	(Italy) Corinna Dentoni (Russia) Anastasia Pivovarova	6–2, 6–7^{(2–7)}, [10–7]
Win	7 April 2008	Jackson, United States	Clay	(Argentina) María Irigoyen	(United States) Christina Fusano (Czech Republic) Michaela Paštiková	1–6, 6–3, [10–6]
Loss	4 October 2008	Juárez, Mexico	Clay	(Argentina) Florencia Molinero	(Argentina) Jorgelina Cravero (Argentina) Betina Jozami	0–6, 6–7
Loss	11 October 2008	San Luis Potosí, Mexico	Clay	(Argentina) Florencia Molinero	(Brazil) Maria Fernanda Alves (Portugal) Frederica Piedade	7–5, 1–6, [8–10]
Loss	21 March 2009	Irapuato, Mexico	Hard	(South Africa) Chanelle Scheepers	(Argentina) Jorgelina Cravero (Argentina) Veronica Spiegel	1–6, 0–6
