= Flavia Mignola =

Argentine tennis player

- Country (sports): Argentina
- Born: 20 October 1985 (age 40) Esperanza, Santa Fe, Argentina
- Plays: Right-handed
- Prize money: US$ 42,312

Singles
- Career titles: 1 ITF
- Highest ranking: No. 372 (25 October 2004)

Doubles
- Career titles: 18 ITF
- Highest ranking: No. 222 (21 June 2004)

Flavia Mignola (born 20 October 1985) is an Argentine former professional tennis player.

A right-handed player from Santa Fe, Mignola began competing in professional tournaments in 2001. She reached a career-high singles ranking of 372, winning an ITF title in Los Mochis in 2005. Most successful as a doubles player, she won a total of 18 ITF doubles titles, with a best ranking of 222 in the world.

== ITF finals ==
$25,000 tournaments
$10,000 tournaments

=== Singles: 5 (1–4) ===
Outcome	No.	Date	Tournament	Surface	Opponent	Score
Runner-up	1.	13 October 2003	ITF Santo Domingo, Dominican Republic	Hard	(Argentina) Soledad Esperón	1–6, 1–6
Winner	1.	10 May 2005	ITF Los Mochis, Mexico	Clay	(Argentina) Jorgelina Cravero	6–1, 6–7^{(5)}, 6–4
Runner-up	2.	6 February 2006	ITF Mérida, Mexico	Hard	(United States) Jennifer Magley	6–3, 3–6, 5–7
Runner-up	3.	26 June 2006	ITF Córdoba, Argentina	Clay	(Uruguay) Estefanía Craciún	0–6, 2–6
Runner-up	4.	21 August 2006	ITF Bogotá, Colombia	Clay	(Argentina) Viky Núñez Fuentes	1–6, 6–7^{(2)}

=== Doubles: 28 (18–10) ===
Outcome	No.	Date	Tournament	Surface	Partner	Opponents	Score
Winner	1.	23 June 2003	ITF Victoria, Mexico	Hard	(Argentina) Soledad Esperón	(Brazil) Maria Fernanda Alves (Brazil) Carla Tiene	5–7, 7–6^{(3)}, 7–5
Winner	2.	20 July 2003	ITF Puerto Ordaz, Venezuela	Hard	(Argentina) Soledad Esperón	(Argentina) Virginia Donda (Argentina) Betina Jozami	6–4, 6–4
Runner-up	1.	28 July 2003	ITF Manta, Ecuador	Hard	(Argentina) Soledad Esperón	(Colombia) Maryori Franco (Ukraine) Olena Tsutskova	6–3, 3–6, 5–7
Winner	3.	6 October 2003	ITF San Salvador, El Salvador	Clay	(Argentina) Soledad Esperón	(El Salvador) Liz Cruz (El Salvador) Marcela Rodezno	6–4, 2–6, 6–2
Runner-up	2.	13 October 2003	ITF Santo Domingo, Dominican Republic	Hard	(Argentina) Soledad Esperón	(Spain) Julia Gandia (Spain) Gabriela Velasco Andreu	3–6, 6–4, 5–7
Runner-up	3.	19 October 2003	ITF Valencia, Venezuela	Hard	(Argentina) Soledad Esperón	(Czech Republic) Zuzana Černá (Czech Republic) Eva Hrdinová	3–6, 6–4, 1–6
Winner	4.	3 November 2003	ITF Los Mochis, Mexico	Clay	(Argentina) Soledad Esperón	(Uruguay) Ana Lucía Migliarini de León (Mexico) Daniela Múñoz Gallegos	6–2, 6–1
Runner-up	4.	8 February 2004	ITF Algarve, Portugal	Clay	(Argentina) Soledad Esperón	(France) Kildine Chevalier (Portugal) Frederica Piedade	6–2, 3–6, 4–6
Winner	5.	22 February 2004	ITF Portimão, Portugal	Hard	(Argentina) Soledad Esperón	(France) Florence Haring (France) Alexandra Mayrat	6–1, 6–1
Winner	6.	30 March 2004	ITF Obregón, Mexico	Hard	(Argentina) Soledad Esperón	(Venezuela) Stephanie Schaer (Japan) Ayami Takase	2–6, 6–4, 6–4
Winner	7.	26 April 2004	ITF Coatzacoalcos, Mexico	Hard	(Argentina) Soledad Esperón	(Spain) Laura Pous Tió (Spain) Lourdes Domínguez Lino	6–0, 6–1
Winner	8.	7 June 2004	ITF Hamilton, Canada	Clay	(Argentina) Soledad Esperón	(United States) Kaysie Smashey (Canada) Aneta Soukup	7–6^{(4)}, 3–6, 6–4
Winner	9.	20 June 2004	ITF Mont-Tremblant, Canada	Clay	(Argentina) Soledad Esperón	(United States) Kaysie Smashey (Canada) Aneta Soukup	6–0, 2–6, 7–6^{(6)}
Runner-up	5.	18 October 2004	ITF Aguascalientes, Mexico	Clay	(Argentina) Jorgelina Cravero	(Mexico) Marcela Arroyo (Mexico) Melissa Torres Sandoval	3–6, 2–6
Winner	10.	25 October 2004	ITF Los Mochis, Mexico	Clay	(Argentina) Jorgelina Cravero	(Chile) Valentina Castro (Uruguay) Ana Lucía Migliarini de León	6–2, 3–6, 7–5
Winner	11.	January 9, 2005	ITF Buenos Aires, Argentina	Clay	(Argentina) Veronica Spiegel	(Argentina) Patricia Holzman (Argentina) Mariana López Terribile	6–1, 7–6^{(5)}
Runner-up	6.	11 April 2005	ITF Tampico, Mexico	Hard	(Argentina) Andrea Benítez	(France) Kildine Chevalier (Argentina) Jorgelina Cravero	6–7^{(6)}, 6–2, 5–7
Winner	12.	10 May 2005	ITF Los Mochis, Mexico	Clay	(Argentina) Jorgelina Cravero	(Mexico) Lorena Arias (Mexico) Erika Clarke	6–3, 6–0
Winner	13.	17 May 2005	ITF Mazatlán, Mexico	Hard	(Argentina) Jorgelina Cravero	(United States) Lauren Barnikow (United States) Kelly Schmandt	6–4, 6–3
Winner	14.	6 June 2005	ITF San Salvador, El Salvador	Clay	(Argentina) Andrea Benítez	(Argentina) Patricia Holzman (Chile) Andrea Koch Benvenuto	w/o
Runner-up	7.	23 August 2005	ITF Amarante, Portugal	Hard	(Spain) Gabriela Velasco Andreu	(Brazil) Joana Cortez (Portugal) Neuza Silva	2–6, 3–6
Winner	15.	13 February 2006	ITF San Cristóbal, Mexico	Hard	(Argentina) María Irigoyen	(Mexico) Erika Clarke (United States) Courtney Nagle	2–1 ret.
Runner-up	8.	5 June 2006	ITF Jalapa, Mexico	Hard	(Argentina) María Irigoyen	(Argentina) Betina Jozami (Mexico) Daniela Múñoz Gallegos	6–7^{(8)}, 6–3, 1–6
Winner	16.	26 June 2006	ITF Córdoba, Argentina	Clay	(Argentina) María Irigoyen	(Chile) Melisa Miranda (Argentina) Luciana Sarmenti	6–3, 6–4
Runner-up	9.	10 July 2006	ITF Caracas, Venezuela	Hard	(Argentina) María Irigoyen	(Argentina) Betina Jozami (Chile) Andrea Koch Benvenuto	6–4, 2–6, 2–6
Winner	17.	12 September 2006	ITF Caracas, Venezuela	Clay	(Argentina) Luciana Sarmenti	(Cuba) Yanet Núñez Mojarena (Cuba) Yamile Fors Guerra	6–4, 6–1
Runner-up	10.	2 October 2006	ITF Tucumán, Argentina	Clay	(Argentina) Luciana Sarmenti	(Argentina) Agustina Lepore (Venezuela) Mariana Muci	4–6, 3–6
Winner	18.	23 October 2006	ITF Luque, Paraguay	Clay	(Colombia) Karen Castiblanco	(Chile) Melisa Miranda (Venezuela) Mariana Muci	6–3, 6–3
