= Christina Fusano =

American tennis player

- Country (sports): United States
- Residence: Plymouth, California
- Born: November 27, 1980 (age 45) Sacramento, California
- Height: 1.63 m (5 ft 4 in)
- Turned pro: 2003
- Retired: 2011
- Plays: Right-handed (two-handed backhand)

Singles
- Career record: 67–78
- Career titles: 0
- Highest ranking: No. 417 (February 21, 2005)

Doubles
- Career record: 210–163
- Career titles: 1 WTA, 13 ITF
- Highest ranking: No. 84 (August 4, 2008)

Grand Slam doubles results
- Wimbledon: 2R (2008)
- US Open: 1R (2003, 2008)

Christina Fusano (born November 27, 1980) is an American former professional tennis player. She attended Ponderosa High School in Shingle Springs, California, where she was an all-league volleyball and basketball player. In tennis, she was the top-ranked junior in Northern California from 1997–99.

== Biography ==
Fusano competed collegiately for the University of California, where she was ranked as high as No. 25 in NCAA Division 1 singles and with Raquel Kops-Jones was the 2003 NCAA Doubles champion. She also was a two-time Pac 10 Doubles champion, 2002 and 2003.

Fusano's career-high WTA doubles ranking is 84, set on August 4, 2008. Her career-high singles ranking is world No. 417, which she reached on February 21, 2005. She played for the Delaware Smash of WTT. She previously played for the Boston Lobsters in 2007, and 2009 she played for the New York Sportimes. She served as a substitute for the Sacramento Capitals in 2010 and 2011.

In July 2011, Fusano won the US Open National Playoffs in mixed doubles with partner David Martin to qualify for the 2011 US Open. She retired from professional tennis 2011.

== WTA Tour finals ==
=== Doubles: 1 (title) ===
Legend
Tier II
Tier III, IV & V (1–0)

Result	Date	Tournament	Surface	Partner	Opponents	Score
Win	Nov 2007	Tournoi de Québec, Canada	Carpet (i)	(United States) Raquel Kops-Jones	(Canada) Stéphanie Dubois (Czech Republic) Renata Voráčová	6–2, 7–6^{(8–6)}

== ITF finals ==
=== Doubles: 29 (13–16) ===
Legend
$100,000 tournaments
$75,000 tournaments
$50,000 tournaments
$25,000 tournaments
$10,000 tournaments

Outcome	No.	Date	Tournament	Surface	Partner	Opponents	Score
Runner-up	1.	August 4, 2002	ITF Harrisonburg, United States	Hard	(United States) Marlene Mejia	(United States) Michelle Dasso (United States) Julie Rotondi	2–6, 6–1, 3–6
Runner-up	2.	March 13, 2005	ITF Toluca, Mexico	Hard	(United States) Lauren Fisher	(Chile) Valentina Castro (Uruguay) Ana Lucía Migliarini de León	2–6, 6–4, 5–7
Runner-up	3.	July 24, 2005	ITF Hammond, United States	Hard	(United States) Ahsha Rolle	(United States) Mary Gambale (United States) Kelley Hyndman	6–2, 3–6, 5–7
Winner	4.	October 23, 2005	ITF Houston, United States	Hard	(United States) Raquel Kops-Jones	(United States) Angela Haynes (United States) Bethanie Mattek-Sands	6–4, 6–3
Winner	5.	February 5, 2006	Taupo, New Zealand	Hard	(United States) Lauren Barnikow	(New Zealand) Leanne Baker (Italy) Francesca Lubiani	6–4, 6–4
Winner	6.	May 28, 2006	El Paso, United States	Hard	(United States) Beau Jones	(United States) Amanda Craddock (United States) Colleen Rielley	3–6, 6–1, 6–2
Winner	7.	June 11, 2006	Hilton Head, United States	Hard	(United States) Raquel Kops-Jones	(United States) Ansley Cargill (United States) Julie Ditty	7–6^{(8)}, 6–4
Winner	8.	June 25, 2006	Fort Worth, United States	Hard	(Australia) Nicole Kriz	(Argentina) Maria-Victoria Domina (United States) Story Tweedie-Yates	2–6, 6–4, 6–1
Winner	9.	July 23, 2006	Hammond, United States	Hard	(United States) Raquel Kops-Jones	(Japan) Ryōko Fuda (United States) Sunitha Rao	7–6^{(7)}, 4–6, 6–1
Runner-up	10.	September 24, 2006	Albuquerque, United States	Hard	(United States) Aleke Tsoubanos	(Venezuela) Milagros Sequera (United States) Julie Ditty	1–6, 4–6
Runner-up	11.	October 15, 2006	San Francisco, United States	Hard	(United States) Aleke Tsoubanos	(United States) Laura Granville (United States) Carly Gullickson	3–6, 1–6
Runner-up	12.	November 19, 2006	Lawrenceville, United States	Hard	(United States) Aleke Tsoubanos	(New Zealand) Leanne Baker (United States) Julie Ditty	6–7^{(5)}, 4–6
Runner-up	13.	December 3, 2006	San Diego, United States	Hard	(United States) Aleke Tsoubanos	(Croatia) Ivana Abramović (Czech Republic) Hana Šromová	4–6, 3–6
Winner	14.	November 18, 2007	La Quinta, United States	Hard	(United States) Ashley Harkleroad	(United States) Angela Haynes (United States) Mashona Washington	6–2, 6–2
Runner-up	15.	April 13, 2008	Jackson, United States	Clay	(Czech Republic) Michaela Paštiková	(Argentina) Soledad Esperón (Argentina) María Irigoyen	6–1, 3–6, [6–10]
Runner-up	16.	August 2, 2008	Vancouver Open, Canada	Hard	(Japan) Junri Namigata	(United States) Carly Gullickson (Australia) Nicole Kriz	7–6^{(4)}, 1–6, [5–10]
Winner	17.	November 16, 2008	San Diego, United States	Hard	(United States) Alexa Glatch	(United States) Angela Haynes (United States) Mashona Washington	6–3, 6–2
Winner	18.	June 14, 2009	El Paso, United States	Hard	(India) Shikha Uberoi	(Brazil) Maria Fernanda Alves (United States) Tetiana Luzhanska	6–3, 7–5
Runner-up	19.	February 21, 2010	Surprise, United States	Hard	(United States) Courtney Nagle	(China) Ji Chunmei (China) Xu Yifan	7–5, 2–6, [5–10]
Runner-up	20.	March 8, 2010	Hammond, United States	Hard	(United States) Courtney Nagle	(China) Zhou Yimiao (China) Xu Yifan	2–6, 2–6
Runner-up	21.	March 20, 2010	Fort Walton Beach, United States	Hard	(United States) Courtney Nagle	(Sweden) Johanna Larsson (South Africa) Chanelle Scheepers	6–2, 6–7^{(4)}, [7–10]
Winner	22.	May 9, 2010	ITF Indian Harbour Beach, United States	Clay	(United States) Courtney Nagle	(United States) Julie Ditty (United States) Carly Gullickson	6–3, 7–6
Runner-up	23.	May 29, 2010	Carson Challenger, United States	Clay	(United States) Courtney Nagle	(United States) Lindsay Lee-Waters (United States) Megan Moulton-Levy	1–6, 2–6
Winner	24.	July 25, 2010	Lexington Open, United States	Hard	(Australia) Bojana Bobusic	(United States) Jacqueline Cako (United States) Story Tweedie-Yates	6–4, 6–2
Winner	25.	September 19, 2010	ITF Redding, United States	Hard	(United States) Yasmin Schnack	(United States) Kim Anh Nguyen (Croatia) Jelena Pandžić	6–2, 3–6, [10–6]
Runner-up	26.	January 15, 2011	ITF Plantation, United States	Clay	(United States) Yasmin Schnack	(United States) Ahsha Rolle (United States) Mashona Washington	4–6, 2–6
Winner	27.	March 5, 2011	ITF Hammond, United States	Hard	(United States) Julie Ditty	(Bosnia and Herzegovina) Mervana Jugić-Salkić (United Kingdom) Melanie South	6–3, 6–3
Runner-up	28.	May 8, 2011	ITF Indian Harbour Beach, US	Clay	(United States) Alexa Glatch	(Ukraine) Alyona Sotnikova (Slovakia) Lenka Wienerová	4–6, 3–6
Runner-up	29.	May 28, 2011	Carson Challenger, US	Hard	(United States) Yasmin Schnack	(United States) Alexandra Mueller (United States) Asia Muhammad	2–6, 3–6
