= Erika Clarke =

Mexican tennis player

- Full name: Erika Clarke-Magaña
- Country (sports): Mexico
- Born: 19 August 1981 (age 43)
- Plays: Right (two-handed backhand)
- Prize money: $59,510

Singles
- Career record: 132–196
- Career titles: 0
- Highest ranking: No. 483 (7 May 2007)

Doubles
- Career record: 162–194
- Career titles: 7 ITF
- Highest ranking: No. 312 (20 April 2009)

Team competitions
- Fed Cup: 5–7

Erika Clarke-Magaña (born 19 August 1981) is a Mexican former professional tennis player.

== Biography ==
A right-handed player from Ciudad Juárez, Clarke represented the Mexico Fed Cup team in ten ties, between 2005 and 2008, with a win–loss record of 5–7.

Clarke was a two-time medalist in doubles at the Central American and Caribbean Games and competed for Mexico at the 2007 Pan American Games, held in Rio de Janeiro.

On the WTA Tour, she featured in the main draw of the doubles at the Mexican Open in Acapulco on four occasions, which included a quarterfinal appearance in 2009.

== ITF Circuit finals ==
$25,000 tournaments
$10,000 tournaments

=== Singles: 2 (2 runner-ups) ===
Result	No.	Date	Tournament	Surface	Opponent	Score
Loss	1.	6 August 2001	ITF Poza Rica, Mexico	Hard	(Mexico) Melissa Torres Sandoval	4–6, 7–6^{(4)}, 5–7
Loss	2.	28 April 2007	ITF Obregón, Mexico	Hard	(United States) Hilary Barte	0–6, 2–6

=== Doubles: 30 (7 titles, 23 runner-ups) ===
Outcome	No.	Date	Tournament	Surface	Partner	Opponents	Score
Winner	1.	3 September 2000	ITF Obregón, Mexico	Clay	(Mexico) Maria Eugenia Brito	(United States) Stephanie Mabry (United States) Martha Garzón Elkins	6–3, 7–6^{(6)}
Runner-up	1.	13 November 2000	ITF San Salvador, El Salvador	Clay	(Mexico) Maria Eugenia Brito	(Bolivia) Daniela Álvarez (Mexico) Zerene Reyes	4–5^{(3)}, 1–4, 3–5
Runner-up	2.	6 August 2001	ITF Poza Rica, Mexico	Hard	(Mexico) Alejandra Rivero	(Mexico) Karin Palme (Japan) Remi Uda	2–6, 3–6
Runner-up	3.	4 November 2001	ITF San Salvador, El Salvador	Clay (i)	(Mexico) Maria Eugenia Brito	(Argentina) Jorgelina Cravero (Brazil) Carla Tiene	1–6, 3–6
Winner	2.	14 June 2002	Pachuca, Mexico	Clay	(Mexico) Graciela Vélez	(Argentina) Celeste Contín (Uruguay) Ana Lucía Migliarini de León	6–0, 6–1
Runner-up	4.	25 August 2002	San Luis Potosí, Mexico	Hard	(Mexico) Alejandra Rivero	(Mexico) Karin Palme (United States) Arpi Kojian	7–6, 3–6, 6–7
Winner	3.	3 May 2004	Mérida, Mexico	Hard	(Republic of Ireland) Anne Mall	(Argentina) Andrea Benítez (Argentina) Betina Jozami	7–5, 7–5
Runner-up	5.	9 November 2004	Mexico City	Hard	(Mexico) Lorena Arias	(Mexico) Marcela Arroyo (Mexico) Melissa Torres Sandoval	1–6, 6–3, 0–6
Runner-up	6.	15 November 2004	Puebla, Mexico	Hard	(Mexico) Lorena Arias	(Mexico) Marcela Arroyo (Mexico) Melissa Torres Sandoval	6–2, 6–7^{(2)}, 0–6
Runner-up	7.	8 May 2005	Obregón, Mexico	Clay	(Mexico) Lorena Arias	(United States) Lauren Barnikow (United States) Kelly Schmandt	0–6, 2–6
Runner-up	8.	10 May 2005	Los Mochis, Mexico	Clay	(Mexico) Lorena Arias	(Argentina) Jorgelina Cravero (Argentina) Flavia Mignola	3–6, 0–6
Runner-up	9.	31 May 2005	Leon, Mexico	Hard	(Mexico) Lorena Arias	(Mexico) Daniela Múñoz Gallegos (Argentina) Andrea Benítez	5–7, 3–6
Runner-up	10.	12 February 2006	Mérida, Mexico	Hard	(Mexico) Daniela Múñoz Gallegos	(Argentina) Betina Jozami (Argentina) Agustina Lepore	1–6, 2–6
Runner-up	11.	19 February 2006	San Cristobal, Mexico	Hard	(United States) Courtney Nagle	(Argentina) María Irigoyen (Argentina) Flavia Mignola	2–1 ret.
Runner-up	12.	16 May 2006	Obregón, Mexico	Hard	(United States) Courtney Nagle	(Argentina) María Irigoyen (Argentina) Agustina Lepore	2–6, 1–6
Runner-up	13.	30 May 2006	León, Mexico	Hard	(United States) Courtney Nagle	(Colombia) Mariana Duque Mariño (Colombia) Viky Núñez Fuentes	6–7, 6–7
Runner-up	14.	25 June 2006	Davos, Switzerland	Clay	(Mexico) Lorena Villalobos Cruz	(Poland) Magdalena Kiszczyńska (Czech Republic) Lucie Kriegsmannová	1–6, 6–7^{(4)}
Runner-up	15.	11 September 2006	Tampico, Mexico	Hard	(United States) Courtney Nagle	(Argentina) Betina Jozami (Mexico) Daniela Múñoz Gallegos	w/o
Runner-up	16.	25 September 2006	Juárez, Mexico	Clay	(United States) Courtney Nagle	(Argentina) Betina Jozami (Uruguay) Estefanía Craciún	1–6, 1–6
Runner-up	17.	27 March 2007	Xalapa, Mexico	Hard	(Mexico) Lorena Arias	(Mexico) Daniela Múñoz Gallegos (Argentina) Andrea Benítez	4–6, 6–4, 1–6
Runner-up	18.	23 April 2007	Obregón, Mexico	Hard	(Mexico) Lorena Arias	(Mexico) Daniela Múñoz Gallegos (Mexico) Valeria Pulido	3–6, 6–3, 1–6
Runner-up	19.	14 May 2007	Irapuato, Mexico	Hard	(Mexico) Lorena Arias	(United States) Courtney Nagle (United States) Robin Stephenson	1–6, 3–6
Runner-up	20.	21 May 2007	Monterrey, Mexico	Hard	(Mexico) Lorena Arias	(Brazil) Maria Fernanda Alves (United States) Courtney Nagle	4–6, 4–6
Runner-up	21.	12 September 2007	Tampico, Mexico	Hard	(Mexico) Lorena Arias	(United States) Catrina Thompson (United States) Christian Thompson	1–6, 4–6
Winner	4.	1 December 2007	Mexico City	Hard	(Mexico) Lorena Arias	(Bolivia) María Fernanda Álvarez Terán (Venezuela) Mariana Muci	6–4, 6–4
Winner	5.	8 September 2008	Celaya, Mexico	Clay	(Mexico) Daniela Múñoz Gallegos	(Mexico) Lorena Arias (Mexico) Angelica Chavez	1–6, 6–1, [10–5]
Runner-up	22.	15 September 2008	Chihuahua, Mexico	Clay	(Mexico) Daniela Múñoz Gallegos	(Mexico) Lorena Arias (Colombia) Paula Zabala	6–2, 4–6, [5–10]
Winner	6.	10 November 2008	ITF Querétaro, Mexico	Hard	(Mexico) Daniela Múñoz Gallegos	(Croatia) Indire Akiki (Bolivia) María Fernanda Álvarez Terán	7–6^{(2)}, 3–6, [10–6]
Winner	7.	24 November 2008	ITF Córdoba, Mexico	Hard	(Mexico) Daniela Múñoz Gallegos	(United States) Sabrina Capannolo (Slovakia) Dominika Diešková	6–3, 6–3
Runner-up	23.	12 September 2009	ITF Mazatlán, Mexico	Hard	(Mexico) Daniela Múñoz Gallegos	(Argentina) Mailen Auroux (Brazil) Fernanda Hermenegildo	3–6, 6–3, [10–12]
