= Melissa Torres Sandoval =

Mexican tennis player and politician

- Country (sports): Mexico
- Born: 3 February 1984 (age 42) Mexico City
- Retired: 2010
- Prize money: $96,745

Singles
- Career record: 167–146
- Career titles: 6 ITF
- Highest ranking: No. 227 (18 February 2008)

Grand Slam singles results
- US Open: Q1 (2008)

Doubles
- Career record: 73–70
- Career titles: 6 ITF
- Highest ranking: No. 207 (25 November 2002)

Team competitions
- Fed Cup: 18–13
Medal record
Representing Mexico
Women's tennis
Pan American Games
Bronze medal – third place	2003 Santo Domingo	Doubles
Central American and Caribbean Games
Bronze medal – third place	2002 San Salvador	Singles
Silver medal – second place	2002 San Salvador	Doubles
Silver medal – second place	2002 San Salvador	Team
Silver medal – second place	2002 San Salvador	Mixed
Bronze medal – third place	2006 Cartagena de Indias	Singles
Gold medal – first place	2010 Mayagüez	Mixed
Summer Universiade
Bronze medal – third place	2009 Belgrade	Mixed

Melissa Torres Sandoval (born 3 February 1984) is a Mexican former tennis player who now serves as a federal lawmaker.

== Life ==
Torres Sandoval was born in Mexico City. She is an alumna of the Universidad Anáhuac, where she obtained her bachelor's degree in business administration in 2008 and a master's degree in journalism in 2014.

=== Tennis career ===
Torres Sandoval has a career-high singles ranking by the Women's Tennis Association (WTA) of 227, achieved on 18 February 2008. She also has a career-high WTA doubles ranking of 207, set on 25 November 2002. Torres Sandoval won six singles and six doubles titles on the ITF Circuit.

Playing for Mexico Fed Cup team, she has a win–loss record of 18–13 in Fed Cup competition.

Torres Sandoval made her WTA Tour debut at the 2007 Abierto Mexicano Telcel. Having entered the tournament with a wildcard in the main draw, she defeated Nicole Pratt and Eva Birnerová in the quarterfinals, before losing to Julia Schruff.

She retired from tennis after the 2009 Abierto Mexicano Telcel in Acapulco, where she lost in the first round to Pauline Parmentier. After her retirement, she became a commentator for ESPN and Uno TV.

=== Political career ===
In 2013, she began a two-year stint as an adjunct director general of the National Security Commission, a division of the Secretariat of the Interior.

In 2015, the Social Encounter Party placed Torres Sandoval second on their list of proportional representation federal deputies from the fourth electoral region, assuring her of a seat in the LXIII Legislature of the Mexican Congress. She serves on eight commissions including Health, Public Security, Gender Alert, Foreign Relations, and Bicameral for Dialogue and Conciliation in Chiapas.

== ITF finals ==
=== Singles (6–3) ===
$100,000 tournaments
$75,000 tournaments
$50,000 tournaments
$25,000 tournaments
$10,000 tournaments

Result	No.	Date	Tournament	Surface	Opponent	Score
Win	1.	6 August 2001	Poza Rica, Mexico	Hard	(Mexico) Erika Clarke	6–4, 6–7^{(4)}, 7–5
Win	2.	1 October 2001	Mexico City, Mexico	Clay	(Mexico) Maria Eugenia Brito	6–1, 6–4
Win	3.	9 October 2001	Pachuca, Mexico	Hard	(Mexico) Maria Eugenia Brito	6–2, 6–2
Win	4.	8 September 2004	Ciudad Victoria, Mexico	Hard	(United States) Tamara Encina	3–6, 6–4, 7–5
Loss	1.	13 September 2004	Matamoros, Mexico	Hard	(United States) Story Tweedie-Yates	6–3, 2–6, 3–6
Win	5.	25 September 2004	San Salvador, El Salvador	Clay	(Brazil) Roxane Vaisemberg	6–2, 3–6, 7–5
Loss	2.	17 October 2004	Mexico City	Hard	(Portugal) Frederica Piedade	5–7, 2–6
Win	6.	9 November 2004	Mexico City	Hard	(Argentina) Micaela Moran	6–3, 7–5
Loss	3.	10 April 2007	Jackson, United States	Clay	(Belarus) Olga Govortsova	1–6, 1–6

=== Doubles (6–4) ===
$100,000 tournaments
$75,000 tournaments
$50,000 tournaments
$25,000 tournaments
$10,000 tournaments

Result	No.	Date	Tournament	Surface	Partner	Opponents	Score
Loss	1.	14 August 2000	Cuernavaca, Mexico	Clay	(Mexico) Erika Valdés	(United States) Stephanie Mabry (Australia) Michelle Summerside	2–6, 3–6
Loss	2.	21 August 2000	Toluca, Mexico	Clay	(Mexico) Erika Valdés	(United States) Kristy Blumberg (United States) Anne Plessinger	w/o
Win	1.	2 April 2002	Coatzacoalcos, Mexico	Hard	(Argentina) Jorgelina Cravero	(Russia) Ekaterina Kozhokina (Australia) Anastasia Rodionova	6–4, 6–3
Loss	3.	11 November 2002	Puebla, Mexico	Hard	(Argentina) Jorgelina Cravero	(Czech Republic) Olga Vymetálková (Czech Republic) Gabriela Chmelinová	1–6, 6–4, 6–7^{(4)}
Loss	4.	30 August 2004	Mexico City	Hard	(Mexico) Marcela Arroyo	(United States) Lauren Barnikow (Ecuador) Mariana Correa	6–7^{(7)}, 5–7
Win	2.	20 September 2004	San Salvador, El Salvador	Clay	(Mexico) Marcela Arroyo	(Argentina) Patricia Holzman (Ecuador) Hilda Zuleta Cabrera	6–1, 7–5
Win	3.	18 October 2004	Aguascalientes, Mexico	Clay	(Mexico) Marcela Arroyo	(Argentina) Jorgelina Cravero (Argentina) Flavia Mignola	6–3, 6–2
Win	4.	9 November 2004	Mexico City	Hard	(Mexico) Marcela Arroyo	(Mexico) Lorena Arias (Mexico) Erika Clarke	6–1, 3–6, 6–0
Win	5.	15 November 2004	Puebla, Mexico	Hard	(Mexico) Marcela Arroyo	(Mexico) Lorena Arias (Mexico) Erika Clarke	2–6, 7–6^{(2)}, 6–0
Win	6.	6 October 2007	Monterrey, Mexico	Hard	(Argentina) Florencia Molinero	(Portugal) Frederica Piedade (Brazil) Roxane Vaisemberg	6–1, 7–5
