= Marcela Arroyo =

Mexican tennis player

- Full name: Marcela Arroyo Vergara
- Country (sports): Mexico
- Born: 13 December 1984 (age 40); Mexico City
- Plays: Right-handed
- Prize money: $18,385

Singles
- Highest ranking: No. 553 (8 March 2004)

Doubles
- Career titles: 4 ITF
- Highest ranking: No. 307 (11 April 2005)

Marcela Arroyo Vergara (Note: In this Spanish name, the first or paternal surname is Arroyo and the second or maternal family name is Vergara.) (born 13 December 1984) is a Mexican former professional tennis player.

== Tennis career ==
Arroyo, a right-handed player, competed on the professional tour in the early 2000s, reaching a best doubles ranking of 307 in the world. She won four ITF doubles titles, all partnering with Melissa Torres Sandoval in 2004.

As a doubles player, she twice featured in the main draw of the Mexican Open.

Arroyo represented Mexico in a total of seven Fed Cup ties, three in 2004 and four in 2005, for a 5–3 overall win–loss record.

At the 2005 Summer Universiade in Turkey, Arroyo teamed up with Lorena Arias to win a bronze medal for Mexico in the women's doubles event.

== ITF Circuit finals ==
=== Doubles (4–1) ===
$25,000 tournaments
$10,000 tournaments

Outcome	Date	Tournament	Surface	Partner	Opponents	Score
Runner-up	30 August 2004	Mexico City	Hard	(Mexico) Melissa Torres Sandoval	(United States) Lauren Barnikow (Ecuador) Mariana Correa	6–7^{(7)}, 5–7
Winner	20 September 2004	San Salvador, El Salvador	Clay	(Mexico) Melissa Torres Sandoval	(Argentina) Patricia Holzman (Ecuador) Hilda Zuleta Cabrera	6–1, 7–5
Winner	18 October 2004	Aguascalientes, Mexico	Clay	(Mexico) Melissa Torres Sandoval	(Argentina) Jorgelina Cravero (Argentina) Flavia Mignola	6–3, 6–2
Winner	9 November 2004	Mexico City	Hard	(Mexico) Melissa Torres Sandoval	(Mexico) Lorena Arias (Mexico) Erika Clarke	6–1, 3–6, 6–0
Winner	15 November 2004	Puebla, Mexico	Hard	(Mexico) Melissa Torres Sandoval	(Mexico) Lorena Arias (Mexico) Erika Clarke	2–6, 7–6^{(2)}, 6–0
