= Ana Lucía Migliarini de León =

Uruguayan tennis player

- Country (sports): Uruguay
- Born: 16 December 1983 (age 42) Montevideo, Uruguay
- Turned pro: 2000
- Plays: Left (two-handed backhand)
- Prize money: $35,754

Singles
- Career record: 112–83
- Career titles: 3 ITF
- Highest ranking: No. 338 (31 March 2003)

Doubles
- Career record: 86–56
- Career titles: 8 ITF
- Highest ranking: No. 338 (25 November 2002)

Team competitions
- Fed Cup: 16–24

Ana Lucía Migliarini de León (born 16 December 1983) is a Uruguayan former professional tennis player.

Migliarini de León won three singles and eight doubles titles on the ITF Women's Circuit. On 31 March 2003, she reached her best singles ranking of world No. 338. On 25 November 2002, she peaked at No. 338 in the doubles rankings.

Playing for Uruguay Fed Cup team, Migliarini de León has a win–loss record of 16–24.

== ITF finals ==
=== Singles (3–5) ===
Legend $100,000 tournaments $75,000 tournaments $50,000 tournaments $25,000 tournaments $10,000 tournaments	Finals by surface Hard (0–2) Clay (3–3)

Result	Date	Tier	Location	Surface	Opponent	Score
Loss	16 April 2001	10,000	Belo Horizonte, Brazil	Hard	(Angola) Helga Vieira	4–6, 7–5, 3–6
Loss	30 April 2001	10,000	Florianópolis, Brazil	Clay	(Germany) Annette Kolb	4–6, 7–5, 3–6
Loss	29 July 2001	10,000	Guayaquil, Ecuador	Clay	(Brazil) Carla Tiene	2–6, 0–6
Win	2 September 2001	10,000	Montevideo, Uruguay	Clay	(Argentina) Sabrina Eisenberg	6–3, 6–2
Win	10 June 2002	10,000	Kędzierzyn-Koźle, Poland	Clay	(Poland) Anna Bieleń-Żarska	2–6, 6–1, 7–6^{(4)}
Loss	1 October 2002	10,000	Mexicali, Mexico	Hard	(Argentina) Celeste Contín	6–4, 3–6, 4–6
Loss	7 October 2002	10,000	Los Mochis, Mexico	Clay	(Argentina) Vanina García Sokol	5–7, 3–6
Win	14 June 2002	10,000	Pachuca, Mexico	Clay	(Mexico) Karin Palme	6–1, 4–6, 7–5

=== Doubles (8–11) ===
Legend $25,000 tournaments $10,000 tournaments	Finals by surface Hard (2–0) Clay (6–11)

Result	Date	Location	Surface	Partner	Opponents	Score
Win	30 April 2001	Florianópolis, Brazil	Clay	(Uruguay) Claudia Salgues	(Brazil) Maria Fernanda Alves (Brazil) Tassia Sono	6–3, 3–6, 6–4
Win	29 July 2001	Guayaquil, Ecuador	Clay	(Bolivia) Daniela Álvarez	(Paraguay) María Alejandra García (Paraguay) Larissa Schaerer	6–2, 6–2
Loss	6 August 2001	Lima, Peru	Clay	(Bolivia) Daniela Álvarez	(Brazil) Maria Fernanda Alves (Brazil) Carla Tiene	6–0, 3–6, 2–6
Loss	13 August 2001	La Paz, Bolivia	Clay	(Bolivia) Daniela Álvarez	(Argentina) Melisa Arévalo (Brazil) Carla Tiene	2–4 ret.
Loss	3 June 2002	Poznań, Poland	Clay	(Argentina) Celeste Contín	(Netherlands) Jolanda Mens (Netherlands) Tessy van de Ven	2–6, 2–6
Win	24 June 2002	Périgueux, France	Clay	(Italy) Giorgia Mortello	(Czech Republic) Zuzana Černá (Ukraine) Irena Nossenko	7–6^{(3)}, 6–2
Win	4 August 2002	Manta, Ecuador	Clay	(Bolivia) Daniela Álvarez	(Mexico) Maria Eugenia Brito (Mexico) Regina Temez	6–2, 4–6, 6–3
Win	12 August 2002	La Paz, Bolivia	Clay	(Bolivia) Daniela Álvarez	(Brazil) Livia Azzi (Brazil) Bruna Colósio	1–6, 6–3, 6–0
Loss	19 August 2002	Asunción, Paraguay	Clay	(Bolivia) Daniela Álvarez	(Brazil) Maria Claudia Alves (Brazil) Bruna Colosio	4–6, 6–1, 2–6
Win	1 October 2002	Mexicali, Mexico	Hard	(Argentina) Celeste Contín	(Brazil) Marcela Evangelista (Brazil) Letícia Sobral	6–4, 6–2
Win	7 October 2002	Los Mochis, Mexico	Clay	(Argentina) Celeste Contín	(Argentina) Jorgelina Barrera (Argentina) Florencia Rivolta	7–5, 6–1
Loss	14 June 2002	Pachuca, Mexico	Clay	(Argentina) Celeste Contín	(Mexico) Erika Clarke (Mexico) Graciela Vélez	0–6, 1–6
Loss	29 September 2003	Guadalajara, Mexico	Clay	(Brazil) Marina Tavares	(Brazil) Marcela Evangelista (Brazil) Carla Tiene	0–6, 6–3, 3–6
Loss	27 October 2003	Obregón, Mexico	Clay	(Mexico) Daniela Múñoz Gallegos	(Argentina) Melisa Arévalo (France) Kildine Chevalier	6–1, 2–6, 4–6
Loss	3 November 2003	Los Mochis, Mexico	Clay	(Mexico) Daniela Múñoz Gallegos	(Argentina) Soledad Esperón (Argentina) Flavia Mignola	2–6, 1–6
Loss	5 September 2004	Asunción, Paraguay	Clay	(Brazil) Bruna Colosio	(Argentina) Betina Jozami (Argentina) Verónica Spiegel	5–7, 4–6
Loss	11 September 2004	Santiago, Chile	Clay	(Brazil) Bruna Colosio	(Argentina) María José Argeri (Brazil) Letícia Sobral	2–6, 0–6
Loss	25 October 2004	Los Mochis, Mexico	Clay	(Chile) Valentina Castro	(Argentina) Jorgelina Cravero (Argentina) Flavia Mignola	2–6, 6–3, 5–7
Win	7 March 2005	Toluca, Mexico	Hard	(Chile) Valentina Castro	(United States) Lauren Fisher (United States) Christina Fusano	6–2, 4–6, 7–5
