= Valentina Castro =

Chilean tennis player

- Country (sports): Chile
- Born: 17 July 1981 (age 43)
- Prize money: $9,768

Singles
- Highest ranking: No. 436 (6 June 2005)

Doubles
- Career titles: 1 ITF
- Highest ranking: No. 548 (16 May 2005)

Valentina Castro (born 17 July 1981) is a Chilean former professional tennis player.

Castro was a regular member of the Chile Fed Cup team from 1998 to 2006, appearing in a total of 33 ties. She won 18 singles and nine doubles rubbers for Chile. On the professional tour, she reached a best singles ranking of 436 in the world, and won her only ITF title in doubles at Toluca in 2005.

Her elder sister, Bárbara, was also a professional tennis player.

== ITF finals ==
=== Doubles (1–2) ===
| Result | Date | Tournament | Surface | Partner | Opponents | Score |
|---|---|---|---|---|---|---|
| Loss | 18 August 2003 | La Paz, Bolivia | Clay | (Chile) Andrea Koch Benvenuto | (Brazil) Marcela Evangelista (Brazil) Letícia Sobral | 6–3, 3–6, 0–1 ret. |
| Loss | 25 October 2004 | Los Mochis, Mexico | Clay | (Uruguay) Ana Lucía Migliarini de León | (Argentina) Jorgelina Cravero (Argentina) Flavia Mignola | 2–6, 6–3, 5–7 |
| Win | 7 March 2005 | Toluca, Mexico | Hard | (Uruguay) Ana Lucía Migliarini de León | (United States) Lauren Fisher (United States) Christina Fusano | 6–2, 4–6, 7–5 |
