= Karen Castiblanco =

Colombian tennis player

- Country (sports): Colombia
- Residence: Bogotá, Colombia
- Born: 9 January 1988 (age 37); La Mesa, Colombia
- Height: 1.60 m (5 ft 3 in)
- Plays: Left-handed (two-handed backhand)
- Prize money: $67,581

Singles
- Career record: 153–171
- Career titles: 1 ITF
- Highest ranking: No. 411 (24 October 2011)

Doubles
- Career record: 239–127
- Career titles: 27 ITF
- Highest ranking: No. 218 (13 February 2012)

Team competitions
- Fed Cup: 12–10
Medal record
Women's tennis
Representing Colombia
Pan American Games
Silver medal – second place	2007 Rio de Janeiro	Doubles

Karen Emilia Castiblanco Duarte (Spanish pronunciation: [ˈkaɾeŋ kastiˈβlaŋko]; (Note: In isolation, Karen is pronounced [ˈkaɾen].) born 9 January 1988) is a former Colombian tennis player and member of the Colombia Fed Cup team. On 24 October 2011, she reached her highest WTA ranking of 411 in singles whilst her best doubles ranking was 218 on 13 February 2012.

== ITF Circuit finals ==
Legend
$50,000 tournaments
$25,000 tournaments
$10,000 tournaments

=== Singles: 4 (1 title, 3 runner-ups) ===
Result	No.	Date	Tournament	Surface	Opponent	Score
Loss	1.	19 October 2008	ITF Lima, Peru	Clay	(Peru) Bianca Botto	1–6, 3–6
Win	2.	25 July 2010	ITF La Paz, Bolivia	Clay	(Chile) Daniela Seguel	6–4, 6–3
Loss	3.	30 October 2010	ITF Bogotá, Colombia	Clay	(Venezuela) Adriana Pérez	1–6, 6–1, 1–6
Loss	4.	6 November 2011	ITF Bogotá, Colombia	Clay	(Colombia) Yuliana Lizarazo	6–4, 5–7, 4–6

=== Doubles: 49 (27 titles, 22 runner-ups) ===
Result	No.	Date	Tournament	Surface	Partner	Opponents	Score
Win	1.	18 September 2004	ITF Bogotá, Colombia	Clay	(Ecuador) Estefania Balda Álvarez	(Colombia) Mariana Duque Mariño (Colombia) Viky Núñez Fuentes	7–6^{(2)}, 7–5
Win	2.	23 October 2005	ITF Asunción, Paraguay	Clay	(Argentina) María Irigoyen	(Argentina) Albertina Gandara (Argentina) Sheila Guerberg	6–4, 6–4
Win	3.	27 August 2006	ITF Bogotá, Colombia	Clay (i)	(Brazil) Roxane Vaisemberg	(Colombia) Mariana Duque Mariño (Colombia) Viky Núñez Fuentes	6–4, 7–6^{(4)}
Loss	4.	8 September 2006	ITF Caracas, Venezuela	Hard	(Venezuela) Mariana Muci	(United States) Story Tweedie-Yates (United States) Jodi Kenoyer	1–6, 1–6
Win	5.	28 October 2006	ITF Luque, Paraguay	Clay	(Argentina) Flavia Mignola	(Chile) Melisa Miranda (Venezuela) Mariana Muci	6–3, 6–3
Loss	6.	18 November 2006	ITF Florianópolis, Brazil	Clay	(Argentina) Jesica Orselli	(Argentina) Agustina Lepore (Argentina) Veronica Spiegel	4–6, 5–7
Loss	7.	18 May 2007	ITF Córdoba, Argentina	Clay	(Chile) Melisa Miranda	(Argentina) Andrea Benítez (Argentina) María Irigoyen	2–6, 4–6
Loss	8.	3 August 2007	ITF Caracas, Venezuela	Hard	(Argentina) Manuela Esposito	(South Africa) Tegan Edwards (United States) Lena Litvak	4–6, 6–3, 6–7^{(2)}
Loss	9.	22 October 2007	ITF Valencia, Venezuela	Hard	(Ecuador) Hilda Zuleta Cabrera	(Bolivia) María Fernanda Álvarez (Venezuela) Mariana Muci	6–4, 1–6, [7–10]
Win	10.	28 April 2008	ITF Bell Ville, Argentina	Clay	(Argentina) Tatiana Búa	(Brazil) Joana Cortez (Brazil) Natalia Guitler	6–4, 1–6, [10–7]
Loss	11.	2 June 2008	ITF Amarante, Portugal	Hard	(Argentina) Tatiana Búa	(Canada) Mélanie Gloria (Spain) Lucía Sainz	6–7, 4–6
Loss	12.	14 July 2008	ITF Badajoz, Spain	Hard	(Colombia) Paula Zabala	(France) Adeline Goncalves (Australia) Kristina Pejkovic	5–7, 5–7
Loss	13.	27 July 2008	ITF La Coruña, Spain	Hard	(Colombia) Paula Zabala	(Portugal) Neuza Silva (Netherlands) Nicole Thyssen	2–6, 2–6
Win	14.	4 October 2008	ITF Curitiba, Brazil	Clay	(Argentina) Aranza Salut	(Brazil) Gisele Miró (Brazil) Isabela Miró	1–6, 6–2, [10–8]
Win	15.	12 October 2008	ITF Mogi das Cruzes, Brazil	Clay	(Argentina) Aranza Salut	(Brazil) Monique Albuquerque (Brazil) Paula Cristina Gonçalves	6–3, 6–1
Win	16.	18 October 2008	ITF Lima, Peru	Clay	(Chile) Andrea Koch Benvenuto	(Venezuela) Marina Giral Lores (Argentina) Paula Ormaechea	6–2, 6–1
Win	17.	25 October 2008	ITF Lima, Peru	Clay	(Chile) Andrea Koch Benvenuto	(Venezuela) Marina Giral Lores (Argentina) Paula Ormaechea	6–7^{(7)}, 6–0, [10–3]
Win	18.	1 November 2008	ITF Lima, Peru	Clay	(Peru) Bianca Botto	(Argentina) Vanesa Furlanetto (Chile) Andrea Koch Benvenuto	6–1, 6–3
Win	19.	8 November 2008	ITF Asunción, Paraguay	Clay	(Argentina) Emilia Yorio	(Brazil) Natalia Guitler (Brazil) Nathalia Rossi	7–5, 6–4
Win	20.	15 November 2008	ITF Santiago, Chile	Clay	(Chile) Andrea Koch Benvenuto	(Czech Republic) Kateřina Kramperová (United States) Nataly Yoo	w/o
Loss	21.	28 March 2009	ITF Lima, Peru	Clay	(Argentina) Vanesa Furlanetto	(Slovakia) Patricia Veresova (Slovakia) Zuzana Zlochová	0–6, 7–5, [5–10]
Loss	22.	2 May 2009	ITF Buenos Aires, Argentina	Clay	(Chile) Andrea Koch Benvenuto	(Brazil) Maria Fernanda Alves (Brazil) Carla Tiene	3–6, 3–6
Loss	23.	6 June 2009	ITF Córdoba, Argentina	Clay	(Argentina) Tatiana Búa	(Brazil) Raquel Piltcher (Brazil) Roxane Vaisemberg	4–6, 3–6
Win	24.	13 June 2009	ITF Santa Fe, Argentina	Clay	(Argentina) Tatiana Búa	(Argentina) Luciana Sarmenti (Argentina) Emilia Yorio	4–6, 6–1, [10–6]
Win	25.	18 July 2009	ITF Bogotá, Colombia	Clay	(Colombia) Paula Zabala	(Brazil) Maria Fernanda Alves (Italy) Nicole Clerico	1–6, 6–1, [10–7]
Loss	26.	10 October 2009	ITF Mexico City	Hard	(Russia) Alina Jidkova	(Bolivia) María Fernanda Álvarez (Portugal) Frederica Piedade	3–6, 4–6
Loss	27.	31 October 2009	ITF Bayamón, Puerto Rico	Hard	(Bolivia) María Fernanda Álvarez	(United States) Kimberly Couts (Canada) Heidi El Tabakh	3–6, 1–6
Win	28.	6 November 2009	ITF Bogotá, Colombia	Clay	(Chile) Andrea Koch Benvenuto	(Colombia) Yuliana Lizarazo (Colombia) Paula Zabala	6–3, 6–1
Loss	29.	14 November 2009	ITF Itajaí, Brazil	Clay	(Argentina) Tatiana Búa	(Brazil) Fernanda Hermenegildo (Brazil) Ana Clara Duarte	6–3, 2–6, [7–10]
Win	30.	11 June 2010	ITF Córdoba, Argentina	Clay	(Argentina) Mailen Auroux	(Argentina) Luciana Sarmenti (Argentina) Emilia Yorio	6–1, 6–2
Loss	31.	18 June 2010	ITF Buenos Aires, Argentina	Clay	(Argentina) Mailen Auroux	(Argentina) Lucía Jara Lozano (Argentina) Guadalupe Pérez Rojas	6–7^{(2)}, 0–1 ret.
Loss	32.	25 June 2009	ITF Buenos Aires, Argentina	Clay	(Argentina) Tatiana Búa	(Argentina) Luciana Sarmenti (Argentina) Emilia Yorio	3–6, 7–6^{(2)}, [8–10]
Loss	33.	18 July 2010	ITF Bogotá, Colombia	Clay	(Argentina) Mailen Auroux	(Venezuela) Andrea Gámiz (Argentina) Paula Ormaechea	7–5, 4–6, [8–10]
Win	34.	24 July 2010	ITF La Paz, Bolivia	Clay	(Argentina) Estefanía Donnet	(Chile) Camila Silva (Chile) Giannina Minieri	6–4, 6–3
Loss	35.	31 July 2010	ITF Cochabamba, Bolivia	Clay	(Argentina) Estefanía Donnet	(Chile) Camila Silva (Chile) Giannina Minieri	4–6, 1–6
Win	36.	7 August 2010	ITF Santa Cruz, Bolivia	Clay	(Argentina) Estefanía Donnet	(Argentina) Tatiana Búa (Argentina) Luciana Sarmenti	2–6, 6–0, [12–10]
Win	37.	28 August 2010	ITF Buenos Aires, Argentina	Clay	(Argentina) Mailen Auroux	(Argentina) Estefania Donnet (Argentina) Carla Lucero	7–5, 6–0
Win	38.	4 September 2010	ITF Santa Fe, Argentina	Clay	(Chile) Camila Silva	(Argentina) Tatiana Búa (Argentina) Aranza Salut	4–6, 6–3, [10–6]
Loss	39.	2 October 2010	ITF Arujá, Brazil	Clay	(Argentina) Vanesa Furlanetto	(Argentina) Carla Lucero (Argentina) Emilia Yorio	6–4, 4–6, [8–10]
Win	40.	10 October 2010	ITF Londrina, Brazil	Clay	(Chile) Camila Silva	(Paraguay) Verónica Cepede Royg (Brazil) Vivian Segnini	6–4, 6–3
Loss	41.	16 October 2010	ITF Lima, Peru	Clay	(Chile) Andrea Koch Benvenuto	(Brazil) Maria Fernanda Alves (Brazil) Isabela Miró	4–6, 4–6
Win	42.	30 October 2010	ITF Bogotá, Colombia	Clay	(Chile) Andrea Koch Benvenuto	(Chile) Fernanda Brito (Chile) Daniela Seguel	1–6, 6–3, [10–6]
Loss	43.	6 November 2010	ITF Bogotá, Colombia	Clay	(Chile) Andrea Koch Benvenuto	(Colombia) Yuliana Lizarazo (Venezuela) Adriana Pérez	2–6, 6–7^{(5)}
Win	44.	13 November 2010	ITF Bogotá, Colombia	Clay	(Chile) Andrea Koch Benvenuto	(Colombia) Karen Ramírez Rivera (Chile) Daniela Seguel	6–4, 7–5
Loss	45.	27 November 2010	ITF Concepción, Chile	Clay	(Chile) Camila Silva	(Chile) Fernanda Brito (Chile) Daniela Seguel	2–6, 3–6
Win	46.	9 April 2011	ITF Caracas, Venezuela	Hard	(Venezuela) Adriana Pérez	(Croatia) Indire Akiki (Czech Republic) Zuzana Linhová	7–5, 6–2
Win	47.	16 April 2011	ITF Caracas, Venezuela	Hard	(Venezuela) Adriana Pérez	(United States) Lena Litvak (United States) Amanda McDowell	7–6^{(10)}, 6–4
Win	48.	20 May 2011	ITF Brescia, Italy	Clay	(Brazil) Fernanda Hermenegildo	(Italy) Evelyn Mayr (Italy) Julia Mayr	4–6, 6–3, [10–6]
Win	49.	4 June 2011	ITF Maribor, Slovenia	Clay	(Venezuela) Adriana Pérez	(Croatia) Ani Mijacika (Croatia) Ana Vrljić	6–3, 7–6^{(9)}
