= Carla Tiene =

Brazilian tennis player

- Full name: Carla Eduarda Tiene
- Country (sports): Brazil
- Born: 15 May 1981 (age 45) Rio Claro, Brazil
- Turned pro: 1997
- Retired: 2010
- Plays: Left-handed (two-handed backhand)
- Prize money: $111,865

Singles
- Career record: 252–176
- Career titles: 8 ITF
- Highest ranking: No. 256 (22 April 2002)

Doubles
- Career record: 252–176
- Career titles: 36 ITF
- Highest ranking: No. 175 (21 October 2002)

Carla Eduarda Tiene (born 15 May 1981 in Rio Claro) is a Brazilian former tennis player.

Tiene was born in Rio Claro and resides in São Carlos. Her career-high singles ranking is No. 256, achieved on 22 April 2002, and her highest doubles ranking is 175, reached on 21 October 2002. Her favourite surface is hardcourt.

Tiene played at the 2002 WTA Brasil Open as a wildcard receiver but lost in the first round to Iva Majoli.

Playing for Brazil Fed Cup team, she has a win–loss record of 12–8.

Tiene retired from professional tennis 2010.

== ITF Circuit finals ==
$100,000 tournaments
$75,000 tournaments
$40,000 tournaments
$50,000 tournaments
$25,000 tournaments
$10,000 tournaments

=== Singles: 18 (8 titles, 10 runner-ups) ===
Outcome	No.	Date	Tournament	Surface	Opponent	Score
Winner	1.	17 May 1999	ITF Victoria, Mexico	Hard	(United States) Stephanie Mabry	6–7, 6–1, 7–6
Winner	2.	29 July 2001	ITF Guayaquil, Ecuador	Clay	(Uruguay) Ana Lucía Migliarini de León	6–2, 6–0
Winner	3.	6 August 2001	ITF Lima, Peru	Clay	(Argentina) Melisa Arévalo	6–3, 6–4
Runner-up	4.	13 August 2001	ITF La Paz, Bolivia	Clay	(Argentina) Jorgelina Cravero	3–6, 3–6
Winner	5.	23 September 2001	ITF São Paulo, Brazil	Hard	(Brazil) Maria Fernanda Alves	6–3, 7–5
Runner-up	6.	4 November 2001	ITF San Salvador, El Salvador	Clay (i)	(Argentina) Melisa Arévalo	6–2, 3–6, 2–6
Runner-up	7.	16 June 2003	ITF Poza Rica, Mexico	Hard	(Brazil) Maria Fernanda Alves	4–6, 5–7
Winner	8.	23 June 2003	ITF Victoria, Mexico	Hard	(Brazil) Letícia Sobral	4–6, 6–1, 6–4
Runner-up	9.	30 June 2003	ITF Monterrey, Mexico	Hard	(Brazil) Maria Fernanda Alves	5–7, 3–6
Runner-up	10.	31 August 2003	ITF Asunción, Paraguay	Clay	(Argentina) Jorgelina Cravero	1–6, 3–6
Winner	11.	22 September 2003	ITF Aguascalientes, Mexico	Clay	(Brazil) Marcela Evangelista	6–3, 6–1
Winner	12.	29 September 2003	ITF Guadalajara, Mexico	Clay	(Mexico) Graciela Vélez	6–4, 6–1
Runner-up	13.	1 November 2003	ITF Belo Horizonte, Brazil	Clay	(Brazil) Bruna Colósio	4–6, 3–6
Runner-up	14.	23 November 2003	ITF Puebla, Mexico	Hard	(Hungary) Melinda Czink	3–6, 2–6
Runner-up	15.	23 November 2003	ITF Florianópolis, Brazil	Clay	(Argentina) Natalia Garbellotto	2–6, 4–6
Winner	16.	22 August 2005	ITF Bogotá, Colombia	Clay	(Chile) Andrea Koch Benvenuto	6–4, 6–0
Runner-up	17.	17 September 2007	ITF Itajaí, Brazil	Clay	(Argentina) Veronica Spiegel	4–6, 1–6
Runner-up	18.	1 September 2008	ITF Barueri, Brazil	Hard	(Brazil) Maria Fernanda Alves	3–6, 5–7

=== Doubles: 59 (36 titles, 23 runner-ups) ===
Outcome	No.	Date	Tournament	Surface	Partner	Opponents	Score
Winner	1.	6 September 1998	ITF Manaus, Brazil	Hard	(Brazil) Bruna Colósio	(Argentina) María José Gaidano (United Kingdom) Joanne Moore	3–6, 6–3, 6–4
Runner-up	2.	16 May 1999	ITF Tampico, Mexico	Hard	(Brazil) Joana Cortez	(Mexico) Melody Falcó (Dominican Republic) Joelle Schad	3–6, 6–4, 4–6
Runner-up	3.	30 August 1999	ITF Querétaro, Mexico	Clay	(Brazil) Joana Cortez	(Brazil) Milagros Sequera (Slovakia) Gabriela Voleková	6–4, 3–6, 4–6
Runner-up	4.	28 November 1999	ITF Rio de Janeiro, Brazil	Clay	(Brazil) Miriam D'Agostini	(Argentina) Celeste Contín (Brazil) Joana Cortez	1–6, 6–3, 3–6
Runner-up	5.	16 April 2000	ITF Belo Horizonte, Brazil	Hard	(Brazil) Tassia Sono	(Brazil) Joana Cortez (Brazil) Miriam D'Agostini	4–6, 1–6
Winner	6.	14 May 2000	Tampico, Mexico	Hard	(Mexico) Melody Falcó	(United Kingdom) Helen Crook (United Kingdom) Victoria Davies	6–4, 6–3
Winner	7.	21 May 2000	Poza Rica, Mexico	Hard	(Mexico) Melody Falcó	(Ecuador) Candice de la Torre (Australia) Nadia Johnston	4–6, 6–2, 6–3
Winner	8.	22 April 2001	Belo Horizonte, Brazil	Hard	(Brazil) Tassia Sono	(Brazil) Marcela Evangelista (Brazil) Letícia Sobral	6–2, 6–3
Winner	9.	22 July 2001	São José dos Campos, Brazil	Hard	(Brazil) Bruna Colósio	(Argentina) Melisa Arévalo (Brazil) Vanessa Menga	6–3, 7–5
Winner	10.	6 August 2001	Lima, Peru	Clay	(Brazil) Maria Fernanda Alves	(Bolivia) Daniela Álvarez (Uruguay) Ana Lucía Migliarini de León	0–6, 6–3, 6–2
Winner	11.	19 August 2001	La Paz, Bolivia	Clay	(Argentina) Melisa Arévalo	(Bolivia) Daniela Álvarez (Uruguay) Ana Lucía Migliarini de León	4–2 ret.
Winner	12.	27 August 2001	Asunción, Paraguay	Clay	(Brazil) Maria Fernanda Alves	(Argentina) Natalia Gussoni (Uruguay) Claudia Salgues	2–6, 6–3, 6–3
Winner	13.	23 September 2001	São Paulo, Brazil	Hard	(Brazil) Vanessa Menga	(Argentina) Melisa Arévalo (Argentina) Jorgelina Cravero	6–3, 6–1
Winner	14.	4 November 2001	San Salvador, El Salvador	Clay (i)	(Argentina) Jorgelina Cravero	(Mexico) Maria Eugenia Brito (Mexico) Erika Clarke	6–1, 6–3
Winner	15.	11 February 2002	Matamoros, Mexico	Hard	(Argentina) Jorgelina Cravero	(Argentina) Melisa Arévalo (Brazil) Vanessa Menga	6–2, 2–6, 7–5
Winner	16.	18 February 2002	Ciudad Victoria, Mexico	Hard	(Argentina) Jorgelina Cravero	(Argentina) Melisa Arévalo (Brazil) Vanessa Menga	6–2, 7–5
Runner-up	17.	31 March 2002	San Luis Potosí, Mexico	Clay	(Brazil) Vanessa Menga	(Czech Republic) Dominika Luzarová (Spain) Arantxa Parra Santonja	5–7, 6–4, 3–6
Runner-up	18.	17 June 2002	Gorizia, Italy	Clay	(Spain) Arantxa Parra Santonja	(Serbia and Montenegro) Sandra Naćuk (Slovenia) Tina Hergold	4–6, 3–6
Winner	19.	21 July 2002	Campos do Jordão, Brazil	Hard	(Brazil) Bruna Colósio	(Netherlands) Jolanda Mens (Netherlands) Andrea van den Hurk	6–1, 4–6, 6–4
Winner	20.	5 August 2002	Rimini, Italy	Clay	(Brazil) Maria Fernanda Alves	(Slovakia) Eva Fislová (Slovakia) Stanislava Hrozenská	6–4, 6–4
Runner-up	21.	10 March 2003	Matamoros, Mexico	Hard	(Brazil) Joana Cortez	(Argentina) Melisa Arévalo (Brazil) Maria Fernanda Alves	0–6, 5–7
Runner-up	22.	17 March 2003	Monterrey, Mexico	Hard	(Brazil) Joana Cortez	(Germany) Caroline-Ann Basu (France) Kildine Chevalier	4–6, 6–3, 5–7
Winner	23.	16 June 2003	Poza Rica, Mexico	Hard	(Argentina) Florencia Rivolta	(Argentina) Melisa Arévalo (Brazil) Maria Fernanda Alves	6–3, 6–3
Runner-up	24.	23 June 2003	Ciudad Victoria, Mexico	Hard	(Brazil) Maria Fernanda Alves	(Argentina) Soledad Esperón (Argentina) Flavia Mignola	7–5, 6–7^{(3–7)}, 5–7
Winner	25.	30 June 2003	Monterrey, Mexico	Hard	(Brazil) Maria Fernanda Alves	(Argentina) Melisa Arévalo (Argentina) Micaela Moran	7–6^{(9–7)}, 6–2
Winner	26.	14 July 2003	Campos do Jordão, Brazil	Hard	(Brazil) Maria Fernanda Alves	(Argentina) Melisa Arévalo (Portugal) Frederica Piedade	7–6^{(7–4)}, 6–2
Runner-up	27.	23 August 2003	Paraná, Argentina	Clay	(Argentina) Erica Krauth	(Argentina) Jorgelina Cravero (Argentina) Vanina García Sokol	1–6, 3–6
Winner	28.	31 August 2003	Asunción, Paraguay	Clay	(Argentina) Jorgelina Cravero	(Brazil) Joana Cortez (Brazil) Marina Tavares	6–3, 6–4
Winner	29.	28 September 2003	Aguascalientes, Mexico	Clay	(Brazil) Marcela Evangelista	(Argentina) Melisa Arévalo (Brazil) Larissa Carvalho	6–3, 2–6, 6–2
Winner	30.	29 September 2003	Guadalajara, Mexico	Clay	(Brazil) Marcela Evangelista	(Uruguay) Ana Lucía Migliarini de León (Brazil) Marina Tavares	6–0, 3–6, 6–3
Winner	31.	3 November 2003	Belo Horizonte, Brazil	Hard	(Brazil) Marcela Evangelista	(Brazil) Bruna Colósio (Brazil) Joana Cortez	6–3, 7–6^{(7–4)}
Runner-up	32.	10 November 2003	Mexico City, Mexico	Hard	(Brazil) Maria Fernanda Alves	(Brazil) Bruna Colósio (Brazil) Joana Cortez	6–1, 3–6, 1–6
Winner	33.	30 November 2003	Florianópolis, Brazil	Hard	(Brazil) Marcela Evangelista	(Brazil) Marina Tavares (Brazil) Gabriela Ziliotto	6–2, 6–3
Winner	34.	29 March 2004	Rabat, Morocco	Clay	(Brazil) Maria Fernanda Alves	(Austria) Daniela Klemenschits (Austria) Sandra Klemenschits	6–1, 7–6^{(7–5)}
Runner-up	35.	9 August 2004	Caracas, Venezuela	Hard	(Brazil) Marcela Evangelista	(Argentina) María José Argeri (Brazil) Letícia Sobral	4–6, 3–6
Runner-up	36.	16 August 2004	Guayaquil, Ecuador	Hard	(Brazil) Marcela Evangelista	(Argentina) María José Argeri (Brazil) Letícia Sobral	3–6, 1–6
Runner-up	37.	23 August 2004	La Paz, Bolivia	Clay	(Brazil) Marcela Evangelista	(Argentina) María José Argeri (Brazil) Letícia Sobral	1–6, 3–6
Winner	38.	4 October 2004	Ciudad Juárez, Mexico	Clay	(Brazil) Maria Fernanda Alves	(Czech Republic) Andrea Hlaváčková (Czech Republic) Jana Hlaváčková	6–4, 6–0
Winner	39.	19 June 2005	Montemor-o-Novo, Portugal	Hard	(Brazil) Marina Tavares	(Germany) Sarah Raab (Germany) Laura Zelder	6–4, 6–3
Winner	40.	13 November 2005	Mexico City, Mexico	Clay	(Brazil) Jenifer Widjaja	(Italy) Francesca Lubiani (Italy) Valentina Sassi	7–6^{(7–5)}, 6–3
Runner-up	41.	4 April 2006	Coatzacoalcos, Mexico	Hard	(Brazil) Jenifer Widjaja	(Argentina) María José Argeri (Brazil) Letícia Sobral	4–6, 5–7
Runner-up	42.	11 June 2006	Móstoles, Spain	Hard	(Brazil) Jenifer Widjaja	(Brazil) Joana Cortez (Spain) María José Martínez Sánchez	3–6, 2–6
Runner-up	43.	16 July 2006	Campos do Jordão, Brazil	Hard	(Brazil) Jenifer Widjaja	(Argentina) María José Argeri (Brazil) Letícia Sobral	3–6, 3–6
Runner-up	44.	3 October 2006	San Luis Potosí, Mexico	Hard	(Argentina) María José Argeri	(Australia) Monique Adamczak (Canada) Marie-Ève Pelletier	7–6^{(7–2)}, 4–6, 4–6
Winner	45.	21 October 2006	Ciudad Victoria, Mexico	Hard	(Brazil) Jenifer Widjaja	(Argentina) Jorgelina Cravero (Portugal) Frederica Piedade	5–7, 6–4, 6–4
Runner-up	46.	30 July 2006	Santa Cruz, Bolivia	Clay	(Argentina) Soledad Esperón	(Brazil) Joana Cortez (Argentina) Jorgelina Cravero	2–6, 6–4, 4–6
Runner-up	47.	10 September 2007	Santo Andre, Brazil	Hard	(Brazil) Larissa Carvalho	(Argentina) Soledad Esperón (Argentina) María Irigoyen	6–4, 2–6, [7–10]
Winner	48.	17 September 2007	Itajaí, Brazil	Clay	(Bolivia) María Fernanda Álvarez Terán	(Argentina) Verónica Spiegel (Argentina) Emilia Yorio	5–7, 6–2, [11–9]
Winner	49.	27 July 2008	Brasília, Brazil	Clay	(Brazil) Fabiana Chiaparini	(Argentina) Carla Beltrami (Brazil) Natalia Guitler	7–5, 4–6, [13–11]
Winner	50.	1 September 2008	Barueri, Brazil	Hard	(Brazil) Maria Fernanda Alves	(Brazil) Ana Clara Duarte (Brazil) Fernanda Hermenegildo	6–2, 6–3
Winner	51.	27 September 2008	Serra Negra, Brazil	Clay	(Brazil) Carla Forte	(Brazil) Ana Clara Duarte (Brazil) Fernanda Hermenegildo	6–4, 2–6, [10–8]
Winner	52.	25 October 2008	Valencia, Venezuela	Hard	(Brazil) Ana Clara Duarte	(Slovenia) Petra Pajalič (United States) Katie Ruckert	6–2, 7–6^{(8–6)}
Winner	53.	1 November 2008	Valencia, Venezuela	Hard	(Brazil) Ana Clara Duarte	(Slovenia) Petra Pajalič (United States) Katie Ruckert	5–7, 7–6^{(7–1)} [10–4]
Winner	54.	7 December 2008	Fortaleza, Brazil	Hard	(Brazil) Natalia Guitler	(Bulgaria) Aleksandrina Naydenova (Brazil) Nathália Rossi	7–6^{(7–5)}, 6–1
Runner-up	55.	13 April 2009	Buenos Aires, Argentina	Clay	(Brazil) Maria Fernanda Alves	(Argentina) Mailen Auroux (Argentina) Veronica Spiegel	2–6, 2–6
Runner-up	56.	20 April 2009	Buenos Aires, Argentina	Clay	(Brazil) Maria Fernanda Alves	(Argentina) Luciana Sarmenti (Argentina) Emilia Yorio	6–7^{(5–7)}, 4–6
Winner	57.	27 April 2009	Buenos Aires, Argentina	Clay	(Brazil) Maria Fernanda Alves	(Colombia) Karen Castiblanco (Chile) Andrea Koch Benvenuto	6–3, 6–3
Runner-up	58.	30 May 2009	Córdoba, Argentina	Clay	(Brazil) Fernanda Hermenegildo	(Argentina) María Irigoyen (Argentina) Carla Beltrami	3–6, 4–6
Winner	59.	15 June 2009	Belém, Brazil	Hard	(Brazil) Maria Fernanda Alves	(Brazil) Ana Clara Duarte (United States) Megan Moulton-Levy	7–6^{(7–1)}, 7–5

== Unplayed final ==
Outcome	No.	Date	Tournament	Surface	Partner	Opponents	Score
NP	—N/a	18 July 2004	Campos do Jordão, Brazil	Hard	(Brazil) Maria Fernanda Alves	(Hungary) Katalin Marosi (Portugal) Frederica Piedade	NP
