= Daniela Múñoz Gallegos =

Mexican tennis player (born 1984)

- Country (sports): Mexico
- Born: 30 January 1984 (age 42) Durango, Mexico
- Prize money: $79,402

Singles
- Career record: 173–177
- Career titles: 4 ITF
- Highest ranking: No. 328 (8 October 2007)

Grand Slam singles results
- US Open: Q1 (2008)

Doubles
- Career record: 182–141
- Career titles: 21 ITF
- Highest ranking: No. 280 (14 September 2009)

Team competitions
- Fed Cup: 14–14

Daniela Múñoz Gallegos (born 30 January 1984) is a Mexican former tennis player.

Múñoz Gallegos has career-high WTA rankings of 328 in singles, reached on 8 October 2007, and 280 in doubles, achieved on 14 September 2009. She won four singles titles and 21 doubles titles at tournaments of the ITF Women's Circuit.

Playing for Mexico Fed Cup team, Múñoz Gallegos has a win–loss record of 14–14.

She made her WTA Tour main-draw debut at the 2010 Abierto Mexicano in the doubles event, partnering Ximena Hermoso.

== ITF finals ==
$25,000 tournaments
$10,000 tournaments

=== Singles (4–2) ===
Result	Date	Tier	Tournament	Surface	Opponent	Score
Win	Aug 2002	10,000	ITF Poza Rica, Mexico	Hard	(Venezuela) Stephanie Schaer	5–7, 6–1, 6–4
Win	May 2005	10,000	ITF Obregón, Mexico	Hard	(United States) Lauren Barnikow	7–6^{(5)}, 2–6, 6–0
Loss	May 2005	10,000	ITF Monterrey, Mexico	Hard	(Argentina) Andrea Benítez	w/o
Win	Sep 2005	10,000	ITF Matamoros, Mexico	Hard	(United States) Raquel Kops-Jones	4–6, 6–2, 6–4
Loss	Sep 2006	10,000	ITF Tampico, Mexico	Hard	(Argentina) Betina Jozami	3–6, 0–6
Win	Dec 2007	10,000	ITF Havana, Cuba	Hard	(Austria) Franziska Klotz	7–6^{(5)}, 6–1

=== Doubles: 31 (21–10) ===
Result	Date	Tier	Tournament	Surface	Partner	Opponents	Score
Loss	14 July 2003	10,000	Puerto Ordaz, Venezuela	Hard	(Argentina) Micaela Moran	(Czech Republic) Zuzana Černá (Germany) Caroline Korsawe	3–6, 6–1, 2–6
Loss	27 October 2003	10,000	Obregón, Mexico	Clay	(Uruguay) Ana Lucía Migliarini de León	(Argentina) Melisa Arévalo (France) Kildine Chevalier	6–1, 2–6, 4–6
Loss	3 November 2003	10,000	Los Mochis, Mexico	Clay	(Uruguay) Ana Lucía Migliarini de León	(Argentina) Soledad Esperón (Argentina) Flavia Mignola	2–6, 1–6
Win	24 May 2005	10,000	León, Mexico	Hard (i)	(Argentina) Andrea Benítez	(United States) Elizabeth Kaufman (Japan) Mari Tanaka	6–4, 1–6, 6–1
Win	31 May 2005	10,000	León, Mexico	Hard	(Argentina) Andrea Benítez	(Mexico) Lorena Arias (Mexico) Erika Clarke	7–5, 6–3
Win	12 September 2005	10,000	Matamoros, Mexico	Hard	(Colombia) Paula Zabala	(Serbia and Montenegro) Ana Četnik (United States) Story Tweedie-Yates	6–4, 6–4
Win	27 September 2005	10,000	Morelia, Mexico	Hard	(Mexico) Valeria Pulido	(Poland) Olga Brózda (United States) Jessica Williams	6–2, 6–0
Loss	12 February 2006	10,000	Mérida, Mexico	Hard	(Mexico) Erika Clarke	(Argentina) Betina Jozami (Argentina) Agustina Lepore	1–6, 2–6
Win	2 May 2006	10,000	Mazatlan, Mexico	Hard	(Colombia) Paula Zabala	(Slovenia) Jelena Durisic (United States) Andrea Remynse	5–7, 6–3, 6–1
Win	11 June 2006	10,000	Xalapa, Mexico	Hard	(Argentina) Betina Jozami	(Argentina) María Irigoyen (Argentina) Flavia Mignola	7–6^{(8)}, 3–6, 6–1
Win	17 September 2006	10,000	Tampico, Mexico	Hard	(Argentina) Betina Jozami	(Mexico) Erika Clarke (United States) Courtney Nagle	w/o
Win	24 September 2006	10,000	Guadalajara, Mexico	Clay	(Argentina) Betina Jozami	(Romania) Alexandra Dulgheru (Mexico) Valeria Pulido	7–5, 6–4
Win	27 March 2007	10,000	Xalapa, Mexico	Hard	(Argentina) Andrea Benítez	(Mexico) Lorena Arias (Mexico) Erika Clarke	6–4, 4–6, 6–1
Win	23 April 2007	10,000	Obregón, Mexico	Hard	(Mexico) Valeria Pulido	(Mexico) Lorena Arias (Mexico) Erika Clarke	6–3, 3–6, 6–1
Loss	7 May 2007	10,000	Mazatlán, Mexico	Hard	(Mexico) Valeria Pulido	(United States) Courtney Nagle (United States) Robin Stephenson	5–7, 4–6
Win	28 May 2007	10,000	Monterrey, Mexico	Hard	(Mexico) Valeria Pulido	(Slovakia) Dominika Diešková (United States) Courtney Nagle	6–3, 0–6, 6–3
Win	17 September 2007	10,000	Chihuahua, Mexico	Clay	(Mexico) Valeria Pulido	(Chile) Melisa Miranda (Ecuador) Hilda Zuleta Cabrera	7–6^{(1)}, 7–5
Loss	19 November 2007	25,000	Mexico City	Hard	(Mexico) Valeria Pulido	(South Africa) Surina De Beer (Paraguay) Rossana de los Ríos	3–6, 1–6
Win	10 December 2007	10,000	Havana, Cuba	Hard	(Mexico) Valeria Pulido	(Austria) Lisa-Maria Moser (Austria) Nicole Rottmann	6–3, 6–4
Win	8 September 2008	10,000	Celaya, Mexico	Clay	(Mexico) Erika Clarke	(Mexico) Lorena Arias (Mexico) Angelica Chavez	1–6, 6–1, [10–5]
Loss	15 September 2008	10,000	Chihuahua, Mexico	Clay	(Mexico) Erika Clarke	(Mexico) Lorena Arias (Colombia) Paula Zabala	6–2, 4–6, [5–10]
Win	10 November 2008	10,000	Querétaro, Mexico	Hard	(Mexico) Erika Clarke	(Croatia) Indire Akiki (Bolivia) María Fernanda Álvarez Terán	7–6^{(2)}, 3–6, [10–6]
Win	24 November 2008	10,000	Córdoba, Mexico	Hard	(Mexico) Erika Clarke	(United States) Sabrina Capannolo (Slovakia) Dominika Diešková	6–3, 6–3
Winner	31 May 2009	10,000	Braga, Portugal	Clay	(Mexico) Ximena Hermoso	(Slovakia) Martina Babáková (Belgium) Davinia Lobbinger	6–3, 6–4
Win	13 June 2009	10,000	Montemor-o-Novo, Portugal	Hard	(Canada) Mélanie Gloria	(Australia) Lucia Gonzalez (Australia) Renee Lampret	7–5, 7–6^{(5)}
Loss	12 September 2009	10,000	Mazatlán, Mexico	Hard	(Mexico) Erika Clarke	(Argentina) Mailen Auroux (Brazil) Fernanda Hermenegildo	3–6, 6–3, [10–12]
Win	12 October 2009	10,000	Mexico City	Clay	(Slovakia) Dominika Diešková	(Chile) Andrea Koch Benvenuto (Colombia) Paula Zabala	w/o
Loss	8 March 2010	10,000	Metepec, Mexico	Clay	(Brazil) Maria Fernanda Alves	(United States) Amanda Fink (United States) Elizabeth Lumpkin	3–6, 7–5, [8–10]
Win	7 June 2010	10,000	Amarante, Portugal	Hard	(Canada) Mélanie Gloria	(Portugal) Magali de Lattre (Australia) Jade Hopper	6–4, 6–2
Win	14 June 2010	10,000	Montemor-o-Novo, Portugal	Hard	(Canada) Mélanie Gloria	(Germany) Kim Grajdek (Bulgaria) Julia Stamatova	7–6^{(3)}, 6–1
Loss	21 June 2010	10,000	ITF Alcobaça, Portugal	Hard	(Canada) Mélanie Gloria	(United Kingdom) Anna Fitzpatrick (United Kingdom) Jade Windley	2–6, 1–6
