= 2007 Fed Cup Europe/Africa Zone Group II – Pool B =

International tennis competition

Group B of the 2007 Fed Cup Europe/Africa Zone Group II was one of two pools in the Europe/Africa Zone Group II of the 2007 Fed Cup. Three teams competed in a round robin competition, with the top team and the bottom two teams proceeding to their respective sections of the play-offs: the top teams played for advancement to Group I, while the bottom team faced potential relegation to Group III.

		(Georgia (country)) GEO	(Portugal) POR	(Bosnia and Herzegovina) BIH	(Norway) NOR	RR; W–L	Set; W–L	Game; W–L	Standings
52	Georgia		0–3	2–0	2–0	2–1	9–6	78–65	2
55	Portugal	3–0		2–0	2–0	3–0	14–1	88–41	1
59	Bosnia and Herzegovina	0–2	0–2		3–0	1–2	6–9	64–71	3
63	Norway	0–2	0–2	0–3		0–3	1–14	39–92	4

== Georgia vs. Norway ==
Georgia
2
National Tennis Centre, Vacoas-Phoenix, Mauritius
17–18 April 2007
Hard (outdoors)

Norway
0

			1	2	3
1	(Georgia (country)) (Norway)	Oksana Kalashnikova; Idunn Hertzberg	6; 1	6; 2
2	(Georgia (country)) (Norway)	Margalita Chakhnashvili; Karoline Steiro	7; 5	6; 4
3	(Georgia (country)) (Norway)	Margalita Chakhnashvili / Oksana Kalashnikova; Idunn Hertzberg / Karoline Steiro				not played

== Portugal vs. Bosnia and Herzegovina ==
Portugal
2
National Tennis Centre, Vacoas-Phoenix, Mauritius
17–18 April 2007
Hard (outdoors)

Bosnia and Herzegovina
0

			1	2	3
1	(Portugal) (Bosnia and Herzegovina)	Neuza Silva; Dijana Stojić	6; 3	6; 3
2	(Portugal) (Bosnia and Herzegovina)	Frederica Piedade; Sandra Martinović	6; 1	6; 2
3	(Portugal) (Bosnia and Herzegovina)	Frederica Piedade / Neuza Silva; Sandra Martinović / Dijana Stojić				not played

== Georgia vs. Portugal ==
Georgia
0
National Tennis Centre, Vacoas-Phoenix, Mauritius
18 April 2007
Hard (outdoors)

Portugal
3

			1	2	3
1	(Georgia (country)) (Portugal)	Oksana Kalashnikova; Neuza Silva	5; 7	4; 6
2	(Georgia (country)) (Portugal)	Margalita Chakhnashvili; Frederica Piedade	2; 6	4; 6
3	(Georgia (country)) (Portugal)	Ekaterine Gorgodze / Sofia Kvatsabaia; Magali de Lattre / Ana Catarina Nogueira	4; 6	6; 3	3; 6

== Bosnia and Herzegovina vs. Norway ==
Bosnia and Herzegovina
3
National Tennis Centre, Vacoas-Phoenix, Mauritius
18 April 2007
Hard (outdoors)

Norway
0

			1	2	3
1	(Bosnia and Herzegovina) (Norway)	Dijana Stojić; Idunn Hertzberg	6; 0	6; 2
2	(Bosnia and Herzegovina) (Norway)	Sandra Martinović; Karoline Steiro	7; 5	6^{4} 7^{7}	6; 1
3	(Bosnia and Herzegovina) (Norway)	Nadina Šećerbegović / Dijana Stojić; Helene Auensen / Emma Flood	6; 3	6; 4

== Georgia vs. Bosnia and Herzegovina ==
Georgia
2
National Tennis Centre, Vacoas-Phoenix, Mauritius
19 April 2007
Hard (outdoors)

Bosnia and Herzegovina
0

			1	2	3
1	(Georgia (country)) (Bosnia and Herzegovina)	Oksana Kalashnikova; Dijana Stojić	6; 2	6; 3
2	(Georgia (country)) (Bosnia and Herzegovina)	Margalita Chakhnashvili; Sandra Martinović	6; 2	7^{8} 6^{6}
3	(Georgia (country)) (Bosnia and Herzegovina)	Margalita Chakhnashvili / Oksana Kalashnikova; Sandra Martinović / Dijana Stojić				not played

== Portugal vs. Norway ==
Portugal
2
National Tennis Centre, Vacoas-Phoenix, Mauritius
19 April 2007
Hard (outdoors)

Norway
0

			1	2	3
1	(Portugal) (Norway)	Magali de Lattre; Helene Auensen	6; 1	6; 1
2	(Portugal) (Norway)	Neuza Silva; Karoline Steiro	6; 2	6; 1
3	(Portugal) (Norway)	Magali de Lattre / Neuza Silva; Helene Auensen / Karoline Steiro				not played

== See also ==
- Fed Cup structure
