= 2007 Fed Cup Europe/Africa Zone Group II – play-offs =

International tennis competition play-offs

The play-offs of the 2007 Fed Cup Europe/Africa Zone Group II were the final stages of the Group II Zonal Competition involving teams from Europe and Africa. Using the positions determined in their pools, the seven teams faced off to determine their placing in the 2007 Fed Cup Europe/Africa Zone Group II. The top two teams advanced to Group I, and the bottom two teams were relegated down to the Group III for the next year.

Placing	Pool A	Pool B
1	South Africa	Georgia
2	Greece	Portugal
3	Finland	Bosnia and Herzegovina
4		Norway

== Promotion play-offs ==
The top two teams of each pool were placed against each other in two head-to-head rounds. The winner of the rounds advanced to Group I for next year.

=== South Africa vs. Georgia ===
South Africa
1
National Tennis Centre, Vacoas-Phoenix, Mauritius
20 April 2007
Hard (outdoors)

Georgia
2

			1	2	3
1	(South Africa) (Georgia (country))	Lizaan du Plessis; Oksana Kalashnikova	6; 3	3; 6	6; 4
2	(South Africa) (Georgia (country))	Surina De Beer; Margalita Chakhnashvili	5; 7	2; 6
3	(South Africa) (Georgia (country))	Kelly Anderson / Surina De Beer; Margalita Chakhnashvili / Ekaterine Gorgodze	6^{2} 7^{7}	5; 7

=== Greece vs. Portugal ===
Greece
0
National Tennis Centre, Vacoas-Phoenix, Mauritius
20 April 2007
Hard (outdoors)

Portugal
2

			1	2	3
1	(Greece) (Portugal)	Asimina Kaplani; Neuza Silva	2; 6	0; 6
2	(Greece) (Portugal)	Anna Gerasimou; Frederica Piedade	2; 6	2; 6
3	(Greece) (Portugal)	Anna Gerasimou / Asimina Kaplani; Frederica Piedade / Neuza Silva				not played

== Relegation play-offs ==
Because there was one extra player in Pool B, the last-placed team of that pool (Norway) was automatically relegated down to Group III. The third-placed teams of each pool were then placed against each other in a tie, where the losing team would join the Norwegians in relegation.

=== Finland vs. Bosnia and Herzegovina ===
Finland
0
National Tennis Centre, Vacoas-Phoenix, Mauritius
20 April 2007
Hard (outdoors)

Bosnia and Herzegovina
2

			1	2	3
1	(Finland) (Bosnia and Herzegovina)	Emma-Sofia Helisten; Dijana Stojić	1; 6	3; 6
2	(Finland) (Bosnia and Herzegovina)	Piia Suomalainen; Sandra Martinović	5; 7	6; 3	4; 6
3	(Finland) (Bosnia and Herzegovina)	Emma-Sofia Helisten / Piia Suomalainen; Sandra Martinović / Dijana Stojić				not played

== Final Placements ==
Placing	Teams
Promoted	Georgia
Promoted	Portugal
Third	South Africa
Third	Greece
Fifth	Bosnia and Herzegovina
Relegated	Finland
Relegated	Norway

- Georgia and Portugal advanced to the Europe/Africa Zone Group I for the next year. Both teams came last in their pools and lost their play-offs, however, and thus fell back to Group II for 2009.
- Finland and Norway were relegated down to Europe/Africa Zone Group III for the next year. The Finns placed third in their pool of six, while the Norwegians placed second in the pool of five.

== See also ==
- Fed Cup structure
