= Emma Helistén =

Finnish tennis player

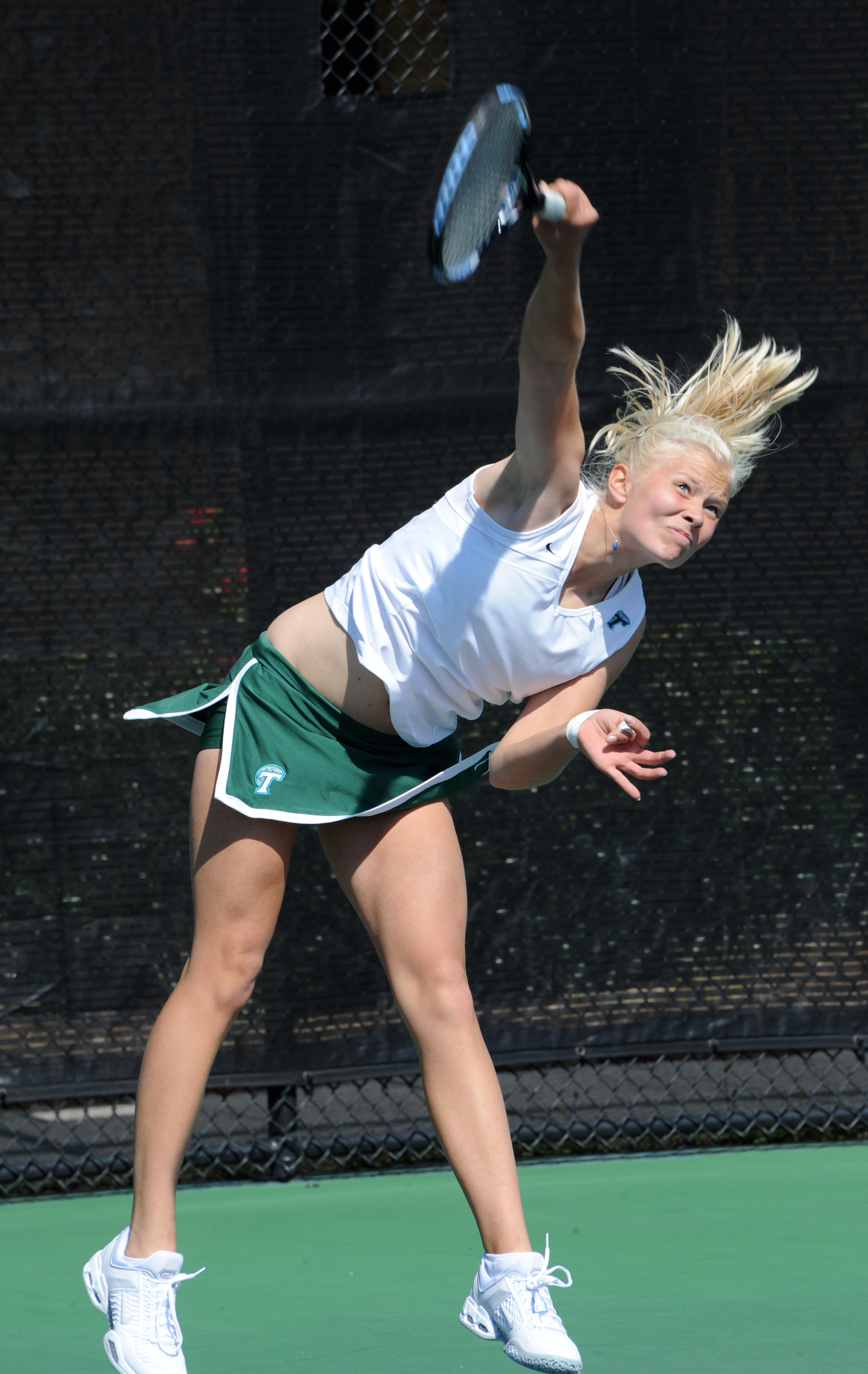
- Helistén in 2010
- Full name: Emma Sofia Helistén
- Country (sports): Finland
- Born: 11 May 1989 (age 35); Helsinki, Finland
- Height: 1.70 m (5 ft 7 in)
- Prize money: $698

Singles
- Career record: 1–5
- Career titles: 0

Doubles
- Career record: 1–5
- Career titles: 0

Team competitions
- Fed Cup: 0–1

Emma Sofia Helistén (born 11 May 1989 in Helsinki) is a Finnish tennis player.

Helistén played one rubber for Finland at the 2007 Fed Cup, a play-off match in which she lost in straight sets to Bosnia's Dijana Stojić.

== Fed Cup participation ==
=== Singles ===
Edition	Stage	Date	Location	Against	Surface	Opponent	W/L	Score
2007 Fed Cup; Europe/Africa Zone Group II	P/O	20 April 2007	Vacoas-Phoenix, Mauritius	Bosnia and Herzegovina	Hard	(Bosnia and Herzegovina) Dijana Stojić	L	1–6, 3–6
