= Jenifer Widjaja =

Brazilian tennis player (born 1986)

- Country (sports): Brazil
- Born: 7 December 1986 (age 39) São Roque, São Paulo, Brazil
- Plays: Right-handed
- Prize money: $78,622

Singles
- Career record: 157–96
- Career titles: 5 ITF
- Highest ranking: No. 186 (8 October 2007)

Doubles
- Career record: 64–64
- Career titles: 2 ITF
- Highest ranking: No. 179 (6 November 2006)

Jenifer Widjaja (born 7 December 1986) is a Brazilian former professional tennis player.

== Biography ==
Widjaja, a right-handed player, is originally from São Roque near the city of São Paulo and is of Indonesian descent.

Coached by her father Tony, she was only 14 when she began competing in local ITF Women's Circuit tournaments. In 2004, she had her breakthrough year when she won three $10k events in the space of a month, at Guayaquil, La Paz and Asunción. Her biggest tournament win was a $25k tournament in San Luis Potosi in 2006.

She featured in a WTA Tour main draw for the first time at the 2007 Copa Colsanitas (Bogota), in the women's doubles with Larissa Carvalho. They were defeated in the first round by Flavia Pennetta and Roberta Vinci. Straight after that, she travelled to Acapulco and made the singles main draw of the Abierto Mexicano, as a lucky loser from qualifying, where she was beaten again in the opening round, by sixth seed Gisela Dulko. She played in the singles qualifying draws for the 2007 French Open, Wimbledon Championships and US Open major events, as well as competing for Brazil at the Pan American Games in Rio de Janeiro.

Despite ending 2007 at a career-best of No. 186 in the world, she decided to retire from professional tennis. Over the next few years, she instead attended college in the United States and played collegiate tennis for the Pacific Tigers in Stockton, California.

She represented Brazil in a total of ten Fed Cup ties for a 6–4 overall record, with all six wins coming in singles.

== ITF finals ==
$25,000 tournaments
$10,000 tournaments

=== Singles (5–5) ===
Result	No.	Date	Tournament	Surface	Opponent	Score
Loss	1.	24 August 2003	La Paz, Bolivia	Clay	(Brazil) Letícia Sobral	2–6, 3–6
Loss	2.	8 September 2003	Santiago, Chile	Clay	(Argentina) María José Argeri	5–7, 1–6
Loss	3.	27 October 2003	Obregón, Mexico	Clay	(France) Kildine Chevalier	0–6, 2–6
Win	1.	22 August 2004	Guayaquil, Ecuador	Hard	(Argentina) Soledad Esperón	6–3, 6–2
Win	2.	29 August 2004	La Paz, Bolivia	Clay	(Chile) Andrea Koch Benvenuto	3–6, 6–4, 6–0
Win	3.	5 September 2004	Asunción, Paraguay	Clay	(Brazil) Larissa Carvalho	5–7, 7–6^{(3)}, 6–3
Win	4.	20 March 2005	Morelia, Mexico	Hard	(Portugal) Frederica Piedade	1–6, 6–4, 7–5
Loss	4.	4 September 2005	Santa Cruz, Bolivia	Clay	(Argentina) Natalia Garbellotto	7–6^{(1)}, 3–6, 3–6
Loss	5.	15 November 2005	Puebla, Mexico	Clay	(Switzerland) Romina Oprandi	1–6, 1–6
Win	5.	3 October 2006	San Luis Potosí, Mexico	Hard	(Brazil) Larissa Carvalho	6–2, 7–5

=== Doubles (2–6) ===
Result	No.	Date	Tournament	Surface	Partner	Opponents	Score
Loss	1.	11 October 2004	Mexico City	Hard	(Brazil) Larissa Carvalho	(France) Kildine Chevalier (Czech Republic) Olga Vymetálková	3–6, 2–6
Loss	2.	24 October 2004	Florianópolis, Brazil	Clay	(Brazil) Larissa Carvalho	(Brazil) Letícia Sobral (Argentina) María José Argeri	6–2, 4–6, 5–7
Win	1.	13 November 2005	Mexico City	Clay	(Brazil) Carla Tiene	(Italy) Francesca Lubiani (Italy) Valentina Sassi	7–6^{(5)}, 6–3
Loss	3.	22 November 2005	San Luis Potosí, Mexico	Hard	(Poland) Olga Brózda	(Italy) Francesca Lubiani (Italy) Valentina Sassi	3–6, 6–4, 5–7
Loss	4.	4 April 2006	Coatzacoalcos, Mexico	Hard	(Brazil) Carla Tiene	(Argentina) María José Argeri (Brazil) Letícia Sobral	4–6, 5–7
Loss	5.	11 June 2006	Móstoles, Spain	Hard	(Brazil) Carla Tiene	(Brazil) Joana Cortez (Spain) María José Martínez Sánchez	3–6, 2–6
Loss	6.	16 July 2006	Campos do Jordão, Brazil	Hard	(Brazil) Carla Tiene	(Argentina) María José Argeri (Brazil) Letícia Sobral	3–6, 3–6
Win	2.	21 October 2006	Ciudad Victoria, Mexico	Hard	(Brazil) Carla Tiene	(Argentina) Jorgelina Cravero (Portugal) Frederica Piedade	5–7, 6–4, 6–4
