= Joana Cortez =

Brazilian tennis player

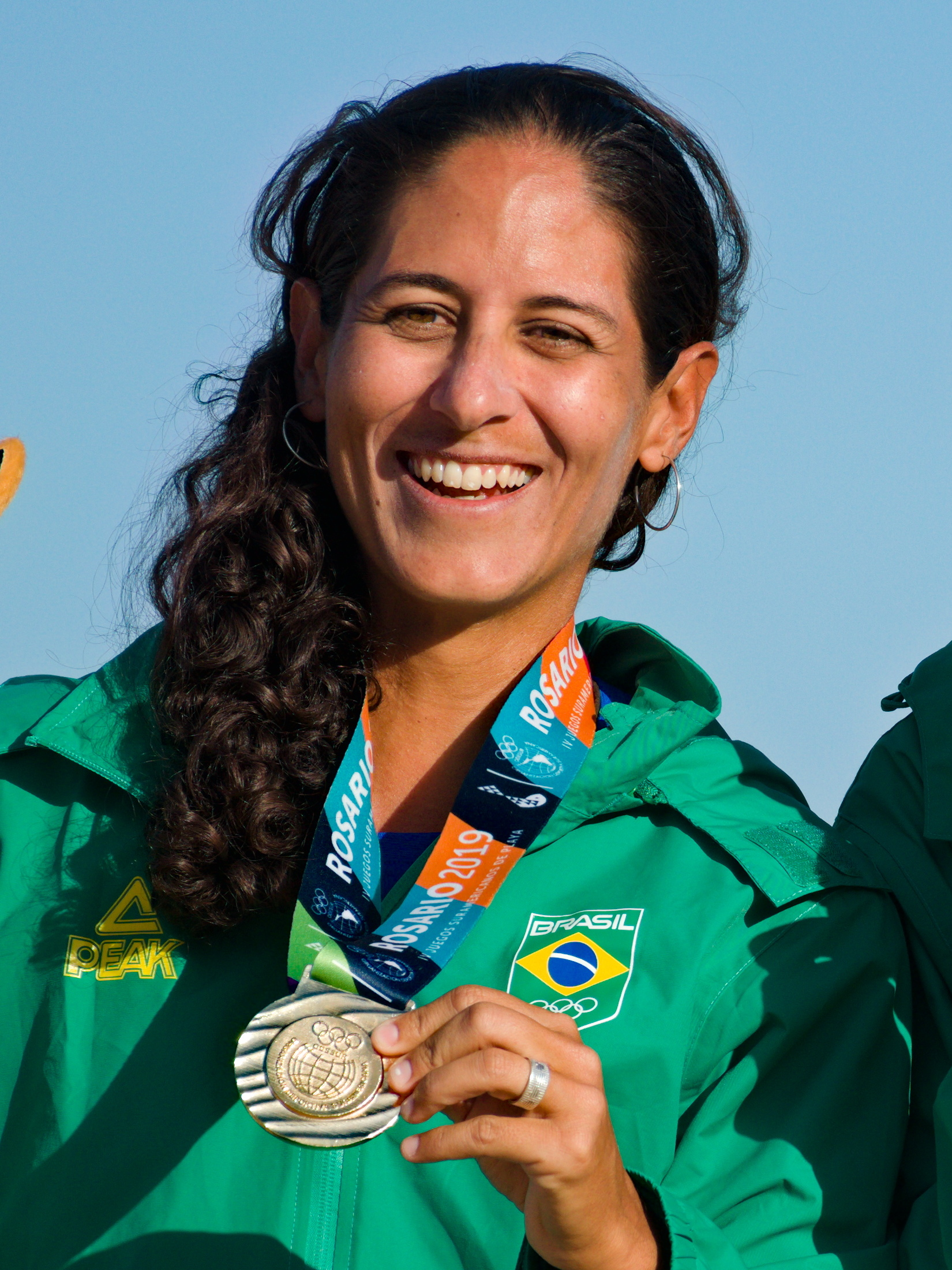
- Full name: Joana Amorim Cortez dos Santos
- Country (sports): Brazil
- Born: 11 January 1979 (age 47) Rio de Janeiro
- Height: 1.70 m (5 ft 7 in)
- Turned pro: 1997
- Retired: 2008
- Plays: Left (two-handed backhand)
- Prize money: $140,665

Singles
- Career record: 231–217
- Career titles: 7 ITF
- Highest ranking: No. 204 (17 September 2001)

Grand Slam singles results
- Australian Open: Q1 (2002)
- US Open: Q1 (2002)

Doubles
- Career record: 313–179
- Career titles: 26 ITF
- Highest ranking: No. 115 (5 November 2001)

Grand Slam doubles results
- Australian Open: 1R (2002)
- US Open: 1R (2001)

Other doubles tournaments
- Olympic Games: 2R (2000)

Team competitions
- Fed Cup: 23–14

Joana Amorim Cortez dos Santos (born 11 January 1979) is a former professional Brazilian tennis player.

== Career ==
In her career, Cortez won seven singles and 26 doubles titles on the ITF Women's Circuit. On 17 September 2001, she reached her best singles ranking of world No. 204. On 5 November 2001, she peaked at No. 115 in the doubles rankings.

Cortez represented Brazil at the 2000 Summer Olympics in women's doubles, reaching the second round with Vanessa Menga. A year previously, the pair won gold at the 1999 Pan American Games. Cortez won gold again in 2003, partnering Bruna Colósio, and in 2007 won bronze with Teliana Pereira in Rio.

Playing for Brazil in the Fed Cup, Cortez has a win–loss record of 23–14.

Cortez played and lost two doubles matches in major events, at the 2001 US Open and in 2002 in Australia.

After retiring from the tour, she became a beach tennis player.

== ITF finals ==
Legend
$40,000 tournaments
$25,000 tournaments
$10,000 tournaments

=== Singles: 15 (7–8) ===
Result	No.	Date	Tournament	Surface	Opponent	Score
Loss	1.	29 November 1998	ITF Rio de Janeiro, Brazil	Hard	(Italy) Valentina Sassi	6–7, 6–3, 3–6
Win	2.	9 May 1999	ITF Poza Rica, Mexico	Hard	(Australia) Nadia Johnston	6–3, 3–6, 6–2
Win	3.	16 May 1999	ITF Tampico, Mexico	Hard	(Australia) Kylie Hunt	6–3, 6–3
Win	4.	30 August 1999	ITF Querétaro City, Mexico	Clay	(Serbia and Montenegro) Katarina Mišić	4–6, 7–6^{(5)}, 6–2
Win	5.	16 April 2000	ITF Belo Horizonte, Brazil	Hard	(United States) Betsy Miringoff	6–3, 6–7^{(5)}, 6–3
Loss	6.	1 May 2000	ITF Coatzacoalcos, Mexico	Hard	(Brazil) Miriam D'Agostini	4–6, 6–2, 1–6
Win	7.	1 April 2001	ITF Santiago, Chile	Clay	(Argentina) Vanina García Sokol	6–3, 6–3
Loss	8.	28 May 2001	ITF Biella, Italy	Clay	(Madagascar) Dally Randriantefy	1–6, 1–6
Loss	9.	10 March 2003	ITF Matamoros, Mexico	Hard	(Brazil) Maria Fernanda Alves	6–3, 4–6, 2–6
Loss	10.	24 March 2003	ITF Monterrey, Mexico	Hard	(Brazil) Maria Fernanda Alves	6–4, 6–7^{(3)}, 4–6
Win	11.	11 October 2004	ITF Campo Grande, Brazil	Clay	(Uruguay) Estefanía Craciún	6–1, 6–1
Loss	12.	28 November 2004	ITF Florianópolis, Brazil	Clay	(Argentina) Micaela Moran	6–2, 2–6, 2–6
Loss	13.	12 June 2005	ITF Nazaré, Portugal	Hard	(Argentina) Florencia Molinero	5–7, 6–3, 0–6
Loss	14.	7 November 2005	ITF São Paulo, Brazil	Hard	(Argentina) Florencia Molinero	5–7, 6–7^{(3)}
Win	15.	11 November 2006	ITF Caracas, Venezuela	Clay	(Venezuela) Marina Giral Lores	7–5, 7–6^{(4)}

=== Doubles: 61 (26–35) ===
Result	No.	Date	Tournament	Surface	Partner	Opponents	Score
Loss	1.	10 November 1996	ITF Campinas, Brazil	Clay	(Brazil) Roberta Burzagli	(Paraguay) Larissa Schaerer (Argentina) Cintia Tortorella	7–5, 3–6, 3–6
Win	2.	20 October 1997	ITF Novo Hamburgo, Brazil	Clay	(Brazil) Ana-Paula Zannoni	(Brazil) Miriam D'Agostini (Brazil) Vanessa Menga	6–3, 6–7^{(4)}, 6–1
Loss	3.	5 October 1998	ITF Montevideo, Uruguay	Hard	(Brazil) Eugenia Maia	(Hungary) Zsófia Gubacsi (Argentina) Mariana López Palacios	6–3, 3–6, 4–6
Loss	4.	30 November 1998	Rio de Janeiro, Brazil	Clay	(Argentina) Sabrina Valenti	(France) Kildine Chevalier (Slovakia) Silvia Uríčková	2–6, 6–3, 3–6
Loss	5.	16 May 1999	Tampico, Mexico	Hard	(Brazil) Carla Tiene	(Mexico) Melody Falcó (Dominican Republic) Joelle Schad	3–6, 6–4, 4–6
Loss	6.	30 August 1999	Querétaro, Mexico	Clay	(Brazil) Carla Tiene	(Brazil) Milagros Sequera (Slovakia) Gabriela Voleková	6–4, 3–6, 4–6
Win	7.	12 September 1999	Mexico City, Mexico	Clay	(Brazil) Vanessa Menga	(Mexico) Melody Falcó (Dominican Republic) Joelle Schad	6–4, 6–2
Win	8.	28 November 1999	Rio de Janeiro, Brazil	Clay	(Argentina) Celeste Contín	(Brazil) Miriam D'Agostini (Brazil) Carla Tiene	6–1, 3–6, 6–3
Loss	9.	28 February 2000	Chengdu City, China	Hard	(Hungary) Katalin Marosi	(China) Li Na (China) Li Ting	1–6, 3–6
Win	10.	16 April 2000	Belo Horizonte, Brazil	Hard	(Brazil) Miriam D'Agostini	(Brazil) Tassia Sono (Brazil) Carla Tiene	6–4, 6–1
Loss	11.	1 May 2000	Coatzacoalcos, Mexico	Hard	(Brazil) Miriam D'Agostini	(Venezuela) Milagros Sequera (Slovakia) Gabriela Voleková	6–4, 3–6, 5–7
Loss	12.	14 May 2000	Midlothian, United States	Clay	(Brazil) Miriam D'Agostini	(United States) Dawn Buth (United States) Julie Scott	3–6, 2–6
Win	13.	21 May 2000	Jackson, United States	Clay	(Brazil) Miriam D'Agostini	(United States) Karin Miller (South Africa) Jessica Steck	6–4, 5–7, 6–1
Loss	14.	11 June 2000	Galatina, Italy	Clay	(Brazil) Miriam D'Agostini	(Italy) Alice Canepa (Argentina) Mariana Díaz-Oliva	4–6, 6–4, 4–6
Loss	15.	2 July 2000	Orbetello, Italy	Clay	(Brazil) Miriam D'Agostini	(China) Li Ting (China) Li Na	3–6, 6–7^{(3)}
Win	16.	9 October 2000	Mexico City, Mexico	Hard	(Brazil) Vanessa Menga	(Germany) Kirstin Freye (Republic of Ireland) Kelly Liggan	5–3, 5–4^{(6–4)}, 4–0
Win	17.	10 December 2000	Bogotá, Colombia	Hard	(Argentina) Mariana Díaz Oliva	(Argentina) Clarisa Fernández (Spain) Conchita Martínez Granados	3–6, 6–1, 6–2
Win	18.	29 January 2001	Clearwater, United States	Hard	(Argentina) Clarisa Fernández	(Russia) Evgenia Kulikovskaya (United States) Jolene Watanabe	6–1, 7–5
Loss	19.	15 April 2001	San Luis Potosí, Mexico	Clay	(Argentina) Clarisa Fernández	(Argentina) Eugenia Chialvo (Spain) Conchita Martínez Granados	7–6^{(3)}, 1–6, 1–6
Win	20.	28 May 2001	Biella, Italy	Clay	(Brazil) Vanessa Menga	(Austria) Daniela Klemenschits (Austria) Sandra Klemenschits	7–6^{(4)}, 4–6, 6–3
Win	21.	25 June 2001	Fontanafredda, Italy	Clay	(Brazil) Vanessa Menga	(Argentina) Melisa Arévalo (Argentina) Natalia Gussoni	6–3, 6–3
Loss	22.	5 August 2001	Alghero, Italy	Hard	(Estonia) Maret Ani	(Australia) Trudi Musgrave (United Kingdom) Julie Pullin	4–6, 5–7
Loss	23.	17 September 2001	São José dos Campos, Brazil	Clay	(Spain) Conchita Martínez Granados	(Brazil) Vanessa Menga (Uruguay) Daniela Olivera	6–4, 5–7, 3–6
Loss	24.	13 May 2002	Bromma, Sweden	Clay	(United States) Tiffany Dabek	(Serbia and Montenegro) Katarina Mišić (Federal Republic of Yugoslavia) Dragana Zarić	4–6, 4–6
Win	25.	24 November 2002	Mallorca, Spain	Clay	(Spain) Rosa María Andrés Rodríguez	(Czech Republic) Ema Janašková (Czech Republic) Vladimíra Uhlířová	6–3, 6–1
Loss	26.	23 February 2003	Columbus, United States	Hard (i)	(Brazil) Bruna Colósio	(China) Li Ting (China) Sun Tiantian	3–6, 1–6
Loss	27.	10 March 2003	Matamoros, Mexico	Hard	(Brazil) Carla Tiene	(Argentina) Melisa Arévalo (Brazil) Maria Fernanda Alves	0–6, 5–7
Loss	28.	17 March 2003	Monterrey, Mexico	Hard	(Brazil) Carla Tiene	(Germany) Caroline-Ann Basu (France) Kildine Chevalier	4–6, 6–3, 5–7
Win	29.	25 May 2003	Catania, Italy	Clay	(Brazil) Bruna Colósio	(France) Aurélie Védy (Greece) Christina Zachariadou	6–1, 6–1
Loss	30.	31 August 2003	Asunción, Paraguay	Clay	(Brazil) Marina Tavares	(Argentina) Jorgelina Cravero (Brazil) Carla Tiene	3–6, 4–6
Win	31.	5 October 2003	Greenville, United States	Clay	(Brazil) Bruna Colósio	(United States) Kelly McCain (United States) Kristen Schlukebir	6–2, 7–5
Loss	32.	9 November 2003	Belo Horizonte, Brazil	Hard	(Brazil) Bruna Colósio	(Brazil) Marcela Evangelista (Brazil) Carla Tiene	3–6, 6–7^{(4)}
Win	33.	16 November 2003	Mexico City, Mexico	Hard	(Brazil) Bruna Colósio	(Brazil) Maria Fernanda Alves (Brazil) Carla Tiene	1–6, 6–3, 6–3
Loss	34.	16 May 2004	Monzón, Spain	Hard	(Brazil) Marina Tavares	(Brazil) Larissa Carvalho (Portugal) Neuza Silva	2–6, 4–6
Loss	35.	14 June 2004	Lenzerheide, Switzerland	Clay	(Brazil) Marina Tavares	(Argentina) Erica Krauth (France) Aurélie Védy	2–6, 4–6
Loss	36.	18 October 2004	Goiânia, Brazil	Clay	(Brazil) Marcela Evangelista	(Argentina) María José Argeri (Brazil) Letícia Sobral	3–6, 3–6
Win	37.	28 November 2004	Florianópolis, Brazil	Clay	(Brazil) Marcela Evangelista	(Brazil) Fernanda Hermenegildo (Paraguay) Sarah Tami Masi	6–4, 6–4
Loss	38.	1 February 2005	Rockford, United States	Hard (i)	(Bulgaria) Svetlana Krivencheva	(United States) Julie Ditty (Czech Republic) Vladimíra Uhlířová	6–3, 5–7, 5–7
Loss	39.	27 March 2005	San Luis Potosi, Mexico	Clay	(Japan) Tomoko Yonemura	(Spain) Lourdes Domínguez Lino (Argentina) Clarisa Fernández	2–6, 2–6
Win	40.	15 May 2005	Casale Monferrato, Italy	Clay	(Brazil) Roxane Vaisemberg	(Hungary) Katalin Marosi (Italy) Gloria Pizzichini	6–2, 6–0
Win	41.	6 June 2005	Nazaré, Portugal	Hard	(Italy) Silvia Disderi	(Georgia (country)) Nana Urotadze (Turkey) Pemra Özgen	6–7^{(3)}, 6–1, 6–4
Win	42.	26 June 2005	Alcobaça, Portugal	Hard	(Germany) Laura Zelder	(United Kingdom) Rebecca Fong (United Kingdom) Kirsty Woolley	w/o
Win	43.	29 August 2005	Amarante, Portugal	Hard	(Portugal) Neuza Silva	(Argentina) Flavia Mignola (Spain) Gabriela Velasco Andreu	6–2, 6–3
Loss	44.	18 September 2005	Sofia, Bulgaria	Clay	(Poland) Karolina Kosińska	(Croatia) Sanja Ančić (Austria) Tamira Paszek	7–6^{(9)}, 2–6, 4–6
Loss	45.	26 February 2006	Portimão, Portugal	Hard	(Portugal) Magali de Lattre	(Netherlands) Sanne van den Biggelaar (Netherlands) Suzanne van Hartingsveldt	w/o
Loss	46.	15 April 2006	San Luis Potosí, Mexico	Clay	(Spain) María José Martínez Sánchez	(Hungary) Zsófia Gubacsi (Croatia) Matea Mezak	6–4, 4–6, 4–6
Win	47.	11 June 2006	Móstoles, Spain	Hard	(Spain) María José Martínez Sánchez	(Brazil) Carla Tiene (Brazil) Jenifer Widjaja	6–3, 6–2
Loss	48.	10 July 2006	Brussels, Belgium	Clay	(Sweden) Aleksandra Srndovic	(Czech Republic) Iveta Gerlová (Germany) Carmen Klaschka	3–6, 2–6
Loss	49.	6 August 2006	Vigo, Spain	Clay	(Brazil) Larissa Carvalho	(Argentina) María José Argeri (Brazil) Letícia Sobral	4–6, 3–6
Loss	50.	8 August 2006	Coimbra, Portugal	Hard	(Portugal) Neuza Silva	(Argentina) María José Argeri (Brazil) Letícia Sobral	6–7^{(4)}, 6–7^{(5)}
Win	51.	13 October 2006	Saltillo, Mexico	Hard	(Brazil) Larissa Carvalho	(Canada) Monique Adamczak (Canada) Marie-Ève Pelletier	6–2, 7–5
Win	52.	30 October 2006	Santa Cruz, Bolivia	Clay	(Argentina) Jorgelina Cravero	(Argentina) Soledad Esperón (Brazil) Carla Tiene	6–2, 4–6, 6–4
Loss	53.	11 November 2006	Caracas, Venezuela	Clay	(Brazil) Fabiana Mak	(Venezuela) Marina Giral Lores (Venezuela) Mariana Muci	6–4, 5–7, 5–7
Win	54.	18 November 2006	Mexico City, Mexico	Clay	(Brazil) Larissa Carvalho	(Croatia) Ivana Abramović (Croatia) Maria Abramović	7–5, 6–2
Loss	55.	8 July 2007	Mont-de-Marsan, France	Clay	(Brazil) Teliana Pereira	(Russia) Nina Bratchikova (Portugal) Neuza Silva	6–3, 7–6^{(3)}
Win	56.	4 August 2007	Campos do Jordão, Brazil	Hard	(Brazil) Roxane Vaisemberg	(Argentina) María José Argeri (Brazil) Letícia Sobral	7–5, 6–0
Win	57.	18 August 2007	Bogotá, Colombia	Clay	(Brazil) Roxane Vaisemberg	(Brazil) Ana Clara Duarte (Brazil) Teliana Pereira	5–7, 6–4, 6–4
Loss	58.	13 September 2007	Sofia, Bulgaria	Clay	(Brazil) Teliana Pereira	(Romania) Mihaela Buzărnescu (Poland) Magdalena Kiszczyńska	6–4, 6–7^{(2)}, [10–4]
Loss	59.	25 November 2007	ITF Sintra, Portugal	Clay	(Brazil) Roxane Vaisemberg	(Italy) Nicole Clerico (Brazil) Teliana Pereira	4–6, 2–6
Loss	60.	28 April 2008	ITF Bell Ville, Argentina	Clay	(Brazil) Natalia Guitler	(Argentina) Tatiana Búa (Colombia) Karen Castiblanco	4–6, 6–1, [7–10]
Win	61.	13 September 2008	ITF Santos, Brazil	Clay	(Brazil) Natalia Guitler	(Brazil) Ana Clara Duarte (Brazil) Fernanda Hermenegildo	6–1, 6–3
