= María José Argeri =

Argentine tennis player

- Country (sports): Argentina
- Born: 16 July 1984 (age 40); Tandil, Argentina
- Turned pro: 1999
- Retired: 2012
- Plays: Right (two-handed backhand)
- Prize money: $137,965

Singles
- Career record: 203–126
- Career titles: 10 ITF
- Highest ranking: No. 149 (11 September 2006)

Grand Slam singles results
- Australian Open: Q3 (2007)
- French Open: Q1 (2006, 2007)
- Wimbledon: Q2 (2006)
- US Open: Q2 (2006, 2007)

Doubles
- Career record: 166–87
- Career titles: 25 ITF
- Highest ranking: No. 105 (25 September 2006)

Team competitions
- Fed Cup: 4–2

María José Argeri (born 16 July 1984) is an Argentine retired tennis player.

On 11 September 2006, she reached her best singles ranking of world No. 149. On 25 September 2006, she peaked at No. 105 in the doubles rankings. Argeri started playing tennis at the age of seven and won ten singles titles and 25 doubles titles on the ITF Women's Circuit in her career.

She made her WTA Tour main-draw debut at the 2007 Copa Colsanitas in the doubles draw, partnering with Letícia Sobral.

Competing for Argentina in the Fed Cup, Argeri has a win–loss record of 4–2.

== ITF finals ==
=== Singles: 18 (10–8) ===
Legend $100,000 tournaments $75,000 tournaments $50,000 tournaments $25,000 tournaments $10,000 tournaments	Finals by surface Hard (6–4) Clay (4–4)

Outcome	Date	Location	Surface	Opponent	Score
Winner	16 June 2002	Canet-en-Roussillon, France	Clay	(France) Laura Rocchi	w/o
Winner	28 July 2003	Pontevedra, Spain	Hard	(Spain) Lourdes Domínguez Lino	6–3, 2–6, 6–2
Winner	8 September 2003	Santiago, Chile	Clay	(Brazil) Jenifer Widjaja	7–5, 6–1
Winner	19 October 2003	Valencia, Venezuela	Hard	(Germany) Jacqueline Froehlich	6–2, 6–3
Winner	9 August 2004	Caracas, Venezuela	Hard	(Argentina) Soledad Esperón	6–4, 6–2
Winner	12 September 2004	Santiago, Chile	Clay	(Argentina) Betina Jozami	6–4, 7–5
Runner-up	4 October 2004	Ciudad Juárez, Mexico	Clay	(Brazil) Maria Fernanda Alves	5–7, 3–6
Winner	18 October 2004	Goiânia, Brazil	Clay	(Ecuador) Estefania Balda Álvarez	6–2, 6–4
Runner-up	24 October 2004	Florianópolis, Brazil	Clay	(Brazil) Larissa Carvalho	6–2, 2–6, 5–7
Winner	4 April 2005	Porto, Portugal	Hard	(Germany) Mareike Biglmaier	6–3, 6–1
Runner-up	17 July 2005	Hamilton, Canada	Clay	(Canada) Aleksandra Wozniak	1–6, 2–6
Runner-up	24 July 2005	Campos do Jordão, Brazil	Hard	(Brazil) Maria Fernanda Alves	3–6, 5–7
Runner-up	25 September 2005	Mackay, Australia	Hard	(Australia) Casey Dellacqua	6–1, 3–6, 0–6
Winner	23 October 2005	Mexico City, Mexico	Hard	(Canada) Aleksandra Wozniak	6–4, 4–0 ret.
Runner-up	16 April 2006	San Luis Potosí, Mexico	Clay	(Spain) María José Martínez Sánchez	2–6, 6–4, 2–6
Winner	23 July 2006	Campos do Jordão, Brazil	Hard	(Argentina) Betina Jozami	4–6, 6–2, 6–3
Runner-up	14 October 2007	Saltillo, Mexico	Hard	(Ukraine) Tetiana Luzhanska	3–6, 5–7
Runner-up	11 November 2007	Toronto, Canada	Hard (i)	(Germany) Sabine Lisicki	4–6, 4–6

=== Doubles: 34 (25–9) ===
Legend $75,000 tournaments $50,000 tournaments $25,000 tournaments $10,000 tournaments	Finals by surface Hard (14–5) Clay (11–4)

Outcome	Date	Location	Surface	Partner	Opponents	Score
Runner-up	16 June 2002	Canet-en-Roussillon, France	Clay	(Federal Republic of Yugoslavia) Dragica Joksimović	(France) Olivia Crouchent (France) Claire Jalade	6–3, 6–7^{(4–7)}, 1–6
Winner	30 June 2003	Camargo, Spain	Clay	(Argentina) Verónica Spiegel	(Spain) Lourdes Pascual-Rodriguez (Israel) Danielle Steinberg	6–2, 6–3
Winner	27 July 2003	Ancona, Italy	Clay	(Italy) Giulia Meruzzi	(Croatia) Petra Dizdar (Croatia) Matea Mezak	6–3, 6–3
Winner	8 September 2003	Santiago, Chile	Clay	(Brazil) Letícia Sobral	(Argentina) Andrea Benítez (Argentina) Virginia Donda	6–2, 6–2
Runner-up	26 October 2003	Caracas, Venezuela	Hard	(Brazil) Letícia Sobral	(Czech Republic) Zuzana Černá (Czech Republic) Eva Hrdinová	w/o
Winner	23 February 2004	Las Palmas, Spain	Clay	(Brazil) Letícia Sobral	(Hungary) Eszter Molnár (Sweden) Maria Wolfbrandt	6–3, 6–3
Winner	25 May 2004	Campobasso, Italy	Clay	(Brazil) Letícia Sobral	(Italy) Emilia Desiderio (Italy) Claudia Ivone	6–0, 6–1
Winner	9 August 2004	Caracas, Venezuela	Hard	(Brazil) Letícia Sobral	(Brazil) Marcela Evangelista (Brazil) Carla Tiene	6–4, 6–3
Winner	16 August 2004	Guayaquil, Ecuador	Hard	(Brazil) Letícia Sobral	(Brazil) Marcela Evangelista (Brazil) Carla Tiene	6–3, 6–1
Winner	23 August 2004	La Paz, Bolivia	Clay	(Brazil) Letícia Sobral	(Brazil) Marcela Evangelista (Brazil) Carla Tiene	6–1, 6–3
Winner	6 September 2004	Santiago, Chile	Clay	(Brazil) Letícia Sobral	(Brazil) Bruna Colósio (Uruguay) Ana Lucía Migliarini de León	6–2, 6–0
Winner	18 October 2004	Goiânia, Brazil	Clay	(Brazil) Letícia Sobral	(Brazil) Joana Cortez (Brazil) Marcela Evangelista	6–3, 6–3
Winner	24 October 2004	Florianópolis, Brazil	Clay	(Brazil) Letícia Sobral	(Brazil) Larissa Carvalho (Brazil) Jenifer Widjaja	2–6, 6–4, 7–5
Winner	4 April 2005	Porto, Portugal	Hard	(Brazil) Letícia Sobral	(Germany) Annette Kolb (Germany) Laura Zelder	7–6^{(8–6)}, 6–1
Winner	11 April 2005	Porto, Portugal	Hard	(Brazil) Letícia Sobral	(Netherlands) Lisanne Balk (South Africa) Surina De Beer	6–4, 4–6, 7–6^{(15–13)}
Runner-up	15 May 2005	Saint-Gaudens, France	Clay	(Brazil) Letícia Sobral	(United Kingdom) Claire Curran (South Africa) Natalie Grandin	3–6, 1–6
Runner-up	5 June 2005	Nanjing, China	Hard	(Brazil) Letícia Sobral	(Chinese Taipei) Chuang Chia-jung (China) Xie Yanze	3–6, 7–6^{(7–5)}, 2–6
Winner	9 July 2005	College Park, United States	Hard	(Brazil) Letícia Sobral	(United States) Ashley Harkleroad (Bulgaria) Svetlana Krivencheva	6–4, 3–6, 7–6^{(7–1)}
Winner	23 July 2005	Campos do Jordão, Brazil	Hard	(Brazil) Letícia Sobral	(Brazil) Maria Fernanda Alves (Portugal) Frederica Piedade	6–0, 6–2
Winner	8 October 2005	Ciudad Juárez, Mexico	Clay	(Brazil) Letícia Sobral	(Argentina) Soledad Esperón (Czech Republic) Olga Vymetálková	7–6^{(7–1)}, 6–3
Winner	15 October 2005	Ciudad Victoria, Mexico	Hard	(Brazil) Letícia Sobral	(Argentina) Soledad Esperón (Italy) Valentina Sassi	6–3, 6–4
Winner	22 October 2005	Mexico City, Mexico	Hard	(Brazil) Letícia Sobral	(Argentina) Soledad Esperón (Republic of Ireland) Kelly Liggan	7–6^{(7–2)}, 2–6, 6–0
Runner-up	12 February 2006	Midland, United States	Hard (i)	(Brazil) Letícia Sobral	(Venezuela) Milagros Sequera (United States) Meilen Tu	6–4, 5–7, 4–6
Winner	8 April 2006	Coatzacoalcos, Mexico	Hard	(Brazil) Letícia Sobral	(Brazil) Carla Tiene (Brazil) Jenifer Widjaja	6–4, 7–5
Runner-up	14 May 2006	Jounieh, Lebanon	Clay	(Brazil) Letícia Sobral	(Belarus) Tatiana Poutchek (Belarus) Anastasiya Yakimova	4–6, 6–7^{(5–7)}
Runner-up	21 May 2006	Saint-Gaudens, France	Clay	(Brazil) Letícia Sobral	(Croatia) Ivana Abramović (Russia) Alla Kudryavtseva	2–6, 0–6
Winner	22 July 2006	Campos do Jordão, Brazil	Hard	(Brazil) Letícia Sobral	(Brazil) Carla Tiene (Brazil) Jenifer Widjaja	6–3, 6–3
Winner	6 August 2006	Vigo, Spain	Hard	(Brazil) Letícia Sobral	(Brazil) Larissa Carvalho (Brazil) Joana Cortez	6–4, 6–3
Winner	13 August 2006	Coimbra, Portugal	Hard	(Brazil) Letícia Sobral	(Brazil) Joana Cortez (Portugal) Neuza Silva	7–6^{(7–4)}, 7–6^{(7–5)}
Runner-up	8 October 2006	San Luis Potosí, Mexico	Hard	(Brazil) Carla Tiene	(Australia) Monique Adamczak (Canada) Marie-Ève Pelletier	7–6^{(7–2)}, 4–6, 4–6
Winner	4 November 2006	Mexico City	Hard	(Brazil) Letícia Sobral	(Brazil) Maria Fernanda Alves (South Africa) Chanelle Scheepers	6–3, 7–5
Winner	11 November 2006	Mexico City	Hard	(Brazil) Letícia Sobral	(Austria) Patricia Mayr-Achleitner (Austria) Yvonne Meusburger	6–4, 6–2
Winner	16 June 2007	Campobasso, Italy	Clay	(Brazil) Letícia Sobral	(United States) Story Tweedie-Yates (Australia) Christina Wheeler	7–5, 6–3
Runner-up	5 August 2007	Campos do Jordão, Brazil	Hard	(Brazil) Letícia Sobral	(Brazil) Joana Cortez (Brazil) Roxane Vaisemberg	5–7, 0–6
