= Marina Tavares =

Brazilian tennis player

- Country (sports): Brazil
- Born: 17 November 1984 (age 41) Maceió, Brazil
- Plays: Right-handed
- Prize money: $15,720

Singles
- Career titles: 0
- Highest ranking: No. 864 (21 July 2003)

Doubles
- Career record: 80–70
- Career titles: 7 ITF
- Highest ranking: No. 226 (22 June 2009)

Marina Tavares (born 17 November 1984) is a Brazilian former professional tennis player.

== Biography ==
Tavares was born in the city of Maceió in Brazil's northeast. She was a top-100 junior in singles and made a Wimbledon semifinal for girls' doubles in 2002.

A right-handed player, Tavares only had success on the professional tour as a doubles player, with seven ITF titles, including a $50k title in Saguenay. She featured in the main draw of six WTA Tour tournaments, between 2004 and 2009.

She now runs her own tennis school for students in her home state of Alagoas.

== ITF finals ==
Legend
$50,000 tournaments
$25,000 tournaments
$10,000 tournaments

=== Doubles (7–9) ===
Result	No.	Date	Tournament	Surface	Partner	Opponents	Score
Loss	1.	31 August 2003	Asunción, Paraguay	Clay	(Brazil) Joana Cortez	(Argentina) Jorgelina Cravero (Brazil) Carla Tiene	3–6, 4–6
Loss	2.	29 September 2003	Guadalajara, Mexico	Clay	(Uruguay) Ana Lucía Migliarini de León	(Brazil) Marcela Evangelista (Brazil) Carla Tiene	0–6, 6–3, 3–6
Loss	3.	30 November 2003	Florianópolis, Brazil	Hard	(Brazil) Gabriela Ziliotto	(Brazil) Marcela Evangelista (Brazil) Carla Tiene	2–6, 3–6
Loss	4.	16 May 2004	Monzón, Spain	Hard	(Brazil) Joana Cortez	(Brazil) Larissa Carvalho (Portugal) Neuza Silva	2–6, 4–6
Loss	5.	14 June 2004	Lenzerheide, Switzerland	Clay	(Brazil) Joana Cortez	(Argentina) Erica Krauth (France) Aurélie Védy	2–6, 4–6
Win	1.	16 August 2004	Kędzierzyn-Koźle, Poland	Clay	(Hungary) Katalin Marosi	(Czech Republic) Iveta Gerlová (Czech Republic) Sandra Záhlavová	1–6, 6–4, 6–2
Loss	6.	31 August 2004	Mestre, Italy	Clay	(Hungary) Katalin Marosi	(Spain) Rosa María Andrés Rodríguez (Spain) Lourdes Domínguez Lino	1–6, 2–6
Win	2.	19 June 2005	Montemor-o-Novo, Portugal	Hard	(Brazil) Carla Tiene	(Germany) Sarah Raab (Germany) Laura Zelder	6–4, 6–3
Loss	7.	23 August 2005	Maribor, Slovenia	Clay	(Hungary) Katalin Marosi	(Sweden) Mari Andersson (Sweden) Kristina Andlovic	6–7^{(2)}, 3–6
Loss	8.	27 September 2005	Volos, Greece	Carpet	(Hungary) Katalin Marosi	(Italy) Nicole Clerico (Finland) Katariina Tuohimaa	4–6, 2–6
Win	3.	4 October 2005	Rome, Italy	Clay	(Hungary) Katalin Marosi	(Italy) Giulia Meruzzi (Italy) Nancy Rustignoli	walkover
Win	4.	26 June 2006	Salzburg, Austria	Clay	(Hungary) Katalin Marosi	(Austria) Daniela Klemenschits (Austria) Sandra Klemenschits	3–6, 7–6^{(2)}, 6–3
Win	5.	16 June 2008	Davos, Switzerland	Clay	(Hungary) Katalin Marosi	(Czech Republic) Kateřina Kramperová (Austria) Janina Toljan	5–7, 6–4, [10–7]
Loss	9.	30 June 2008	Stuttgart, Germany	Clay	(Hungary) Katalin Marosi	(Germany) Kristina Barrois (Germany) Laura Siegemund	3–6, 4–6
Win	6.	20 October 2008	Saguenay, Canada	Hard (i)	(Hungary) Katalin Marosi	(Canada) Gabriela Dabrowski (Canada) Sharon Fichman	2–6, 6–4, [10–4]
Win	7.	23 March 2009	Latina, Italy	Clay	(Hungary) Katalin Marosi	(Russia) Ekaterina Lopes (Russia) Marina Shamayko	6–2, 6–0
