= Larissa Carvalho =

Brazilian tennis player (born 1985)

- Country (sports): Brazil
- Born: 9 March 1985 (age 40) Brasília, Brazil
- Plays: Right-handed
- Prize money: $55,988

Singles
- Career titles: 5 ITF
- Highest ranking: No. 240 (13 November 2006)

Doubles
- Career titles: 7 ITF
- Highest ranking: No. 194 (4 December 2006)

Team competitions
- Fed Cup: 9–2

Larissa Carvalho (born 9 March 1985) is a Brazilian former professional tennis player.

== Biography ==
Carvalho, a right-handed player from Brasília, was a top-50 ranked junior.

From 2004 to 2007, Carvalho appeared in eleven Fed Cup ties for Brazil, winning four singles and five doubles rubbers.

Carvalho reached a best singles ranking of 240 on the professional tour and won five ITF titles. As a doubles player, she won a further seven ITF tournaments and made a WTA Tour main draw appearance at the 2007 Copa Colsanitas in Bogotá, partnering Jenifer Widjaja.

Her brother Raony Carvalho also played professionally.

== ITF finals ==
$25,000 tournaments
$10,000 tournaments

=== Singles: 8 (5–3) ===
Outcome	No.	Date	Tournament	Surface	Opponent	Score
Winner	1.	17 November 2002	Florianópolis, Brazil	Clay	(Brazil) Bruna Colósio	2–6, 6–4, 7–5
Winner	2.	25 May 2003	Catania, Italy	Clay	(Greece) Christina Zachariadou	6–1, 4–0 ret.
Winner	3.	26 October 2003	Caracas, Venezuela	Hard	(Brazil) Letícia Sobral	6–3, 7–5
Runner-up	1.	30 August 2004	Asunción, Paraguay	Clay	(Brazil) Jenifer Widjaja	7–5, 6–7^{(3)}, 3–6
Winner	4.	24 October 2004	Florianópolis, Brazil	Clay	(Argentina) María José Argeri	2–6, 6–2, 7–5
Winner	5.	13 March 2005	Toluca, Mexico	Hard	(United States) Julia Cohen	6–2, 6–2
Runner-up	2.	3 October 2006	San Luis Potosí, Mexico	Hard	(Brazil) Jenifer Widjaja	2–6, 5–7
Runner-up	3.	5 November 2006	Mexico City	Hard	(France) Mathilde Johansson	1–6, 6–7^{(7)}

=== Doubles: 15 (7–8) ===
Outcome	No.	Date	Tournament	Surface	Partner	Opponents	Score
Runner-up	1.	1 September 2002	Santiago, Chile	Clay	(Argentina) Soledad Esperón	(Brazil) Bruna Colósio (Argentina) Celeste Contín	w/o
Winner	1.	17 November 2002	Florianópolis, Brazil	Clay	(Brazil) Bruna Colósio	(Brazil) Marcela Evangelista (Brazil) Letícia Sobral	6–4, 6–4
Runner-up	2.	28 September 2003	Aguascalientes, Mexico	Clay	(Argentina) Melisa Arévalo	(Brazil) Carla Tiene (Brazil) Marcela Evangelista	3–6, 6–2, 2–6
Winner	2.	10 May 2004	Monzón, Spain	Hard	(Portugal) Neuza Silva	(Brazil) Joana Cortez (Brazil) Marina Tavares	6–2, 6–4
Winner	3.	15 May 2004	Santa Cruz, Spain	Hard	(United Kingdom) Anna Hawkins	(Austria) Eva-Maria Hoch (Germany) Martina Pavelec	2–6, 6–1, 7–6^{(4)}
Runner-up	3.	22 August 2004	Jesi, Italy	Clay	(Italy) Elena Vianello	(Italy) Stefania Chieppa (Italy) Valentina Sulpizio	3–6, 5–7
Runner-up	4.	11 October 2004	Mexico City	Hard	(Brazil) Jenifer Widjaja	(France) Kildine Chevalier (Czech Republic) Olga Vymetálková	3–6, 2–6
Runner-up	5.	24 October 2004	Florianópolis, Brazil	Clay	(Brazil) Jenifer Widjaja	(Brazil) Letícia Sobral (Argentina) María José Argeri	6–2, 4–6, 5–7
Winner	4.	30 August 2005	Mollerusa, Spain	Hard	(Spain) Núria Roig	(Spain) Anna Boada-Plade Llorens (Spain) Rebeca Bou Nogueiro	6–0, 6–1
Runner-up	6.	26 June 2006	Padua, Italy	Clay	(Slovenia) Andreja Klepač	(Croatia) Darija Jurak (Czech Republic) Renata Voráčová	4–6, 3–6
Runner-up	7.	6 August 2006	Vigo, Spain	Clay	(Brazil) Joana Cortez	(Argentina) María José Argeri (Brazil) Letícia Sobral	4–6, 3–6
Winner	5.	13 October 2006	Saltillo, Mexico	Hard	(Brazil) Joana Cortez	(Canada) Monique Adamczak (Canada) Marie-Ève Pelletier	6–2, 7–5
Winner	6.	18 November 2006	Mexico City	Clay	(Brazil) Joana Cortez	(Croatia) Ivana Abramović (Croatia) Maria Abramović	7–5, 6–2
Runner-up	8.	10 September 2007	Santo Andre, Brazil	Hard	(Brazil) Carla Tiene	(Argentina) Soledad Esperón (Argentina) María Irigoyen	6–4, 2–6, [7–10]
Winner	7.	1 August 2009	Campos do Jordão, Brazil	Hard	(Brazil) Vivian Segnini	(Brazil) Monique Albuquerque (Brazil) Paula Cristina Gonçalves	3–6, 6–1, [10–7]
