= Maria Fernanda Alves =

Brazilian tennis player

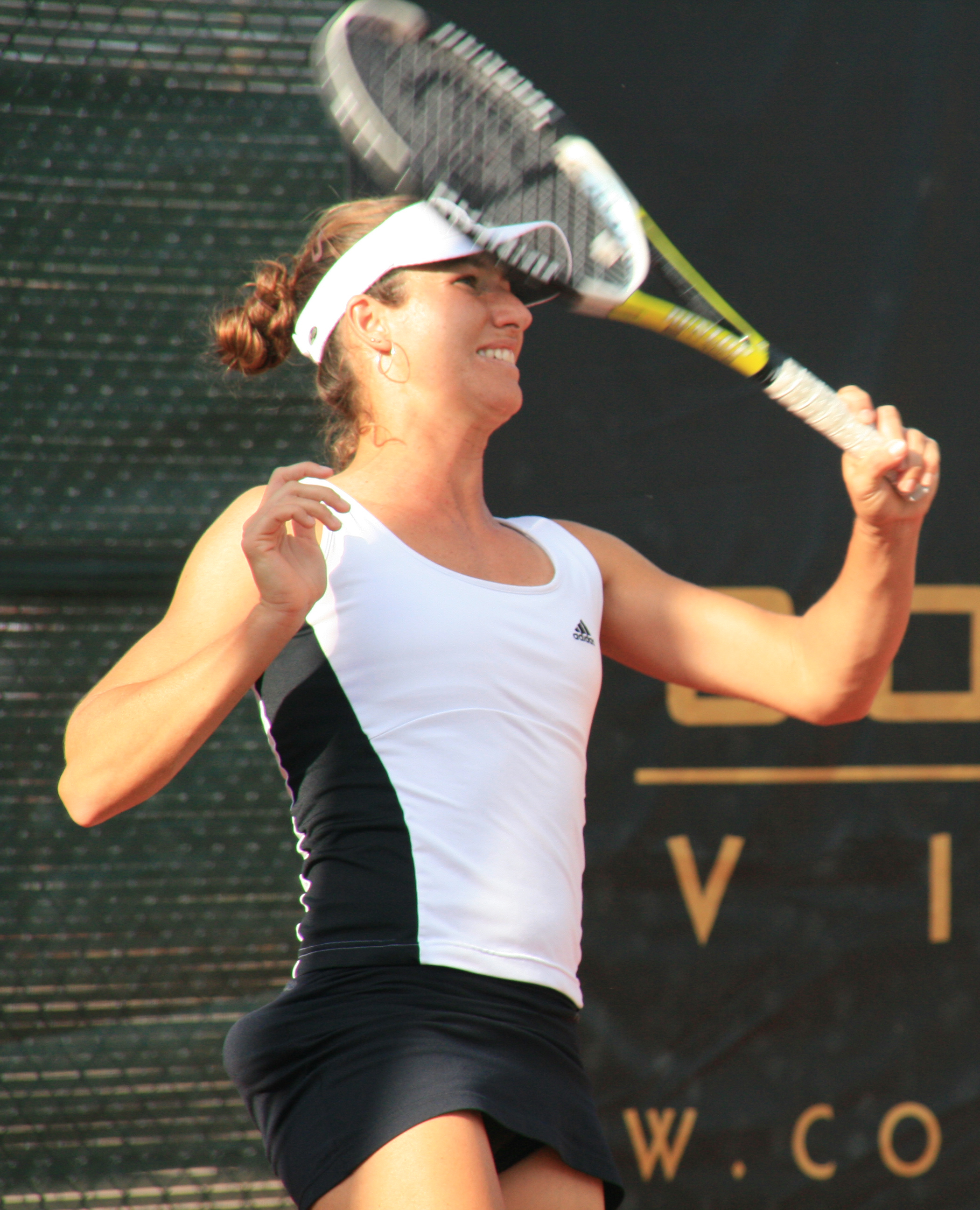
- Full name: Maria Fernanda Barbato Alves
- Country (sports): Brazil
- Residence: Florianópolis, Brazil
- Born: 17 April 1983 (age 43) Florianópolis
- Height: 1.74 m (5 ft 9 in)
- Retired: 2016
- Plays: Left-handed (two-handed backhand)
- Prize money: $405,862

Singles
- Career record: 489–437
- Career titles: 23 ITF
- Highest ranking: No. 132 (12 September 2005)

Grand Slam singles results
- Australian Open: Q2 (2005, 2006)
- French Open: Q3 (2005)
- Wimbledon: Q1 (2005, 2006, 2008)
- US Open: Q3 (2005)

Doubles
- Career record: 611–354
- Career titles: 58 ITF
- Highest ranking: No. 109 (3 April 2006)

Grand Slam doubles results
- Australian Open: 1R (2005)
- Wimbledon: Q1 (2008)

Maria Fernanda Barbato Alves (Brazilian Portuguese: [maˈɾi.ɐ feʁˈnɐ̃dɐ ˈawvis]; born 17 April 1983), also known as Nanda Alves, is a Brazilian former tennis player.

As of 1 March 2010, Alves was ranked world No. 262, and was the highest ranked Brazilian player. She enjoyed success on the ITF Circuit, winning 23 singles and 58 doubles titles. Alves made her WTA Tour debut at Copa Colsanitas in 2004, and played qualifications for all four Grand Slam events. Partnering with Vanessa Henke, she took part in the 2005 Australian Open doubles event, but they lost to Daniela Hantuchová and Martina Navratilova in the first round. After 2016 Brasil Tennis Cup, Alves retired from professional tennis.

== Personal life ==
Alves was born on 17 April 1983 to Carlos José Alves and Maria Cristina Barbato Alves, who were both professional tennis players. She resides in her hometown Florianópolis, Santa Catarina. Alves began playing tennis aged four, along with her older sister Maria Cláudia. She cites Jennifer Capriati (of whom she said, "Capriati, because she played really well; she had problems with drugs and she escaped. I admire her determination to get out of that hole."), Roger Federer and Steffi Graf as her role models, and clay as her favourite surface.

Alves often works with kids in her father's tennis camp in Florida. Some of the players who practised in that camp are former world No. 1 player Gustavo Kuerten, Marcelo Melo, André Sá and others. She was coached by her father Carlos and former tennis professional Thomaz Koch.

== Equipment ==
Alves played in Solfire gear and used a Dunlop racket, the model Aerogel 500 Tour.

== ITF Circuit finals ==
=== Singles: 40 (23 titles, 17 runner-ups) ===
Legend $100,000 tournaments $75,000 tournaments $50,000 tournaments $40,000 tournaments $25,000 tournaments $15,000 tournaments $10,000 tournaments	Finals by surface Hard (15–9) Clay (8–8)

Result	No.	Date	Tournament	Surface	Opponent	Score
Win	1.	24 July 2000	ITF Caracas, Venezuela	Hard	(Venezuela) Stephanie Schaer	6–3, 6–2
Win	2.	13 November 2000	ITF San Salvador, El Salvador	Clay	(Mexico) Alejandra Rivero	4–2, 4–2
Win	3.	25 June 2001	ITF Elvas, Portugal	Hard	(Ukraine) Oleksandra Kravets	6–3, 6–2
Loss	1.	8 July 2001	ITF Getxo, Spain	Clay	(Germany) Sandra Klösel	3–6, 2–6
Loss	2.	23 September 2001	ITF São Paulo, Brazil	Hard	(Brazil) Carla Tiene	3–6, 5–7
Win	4.	6 April 2002	ITF Belo Horizonte, Brazil	Hard	(Argentina) Vanina García Sokol	6–3, 6–1
Loss	3.	15 July 2002	ITF Campos do Jordão, Brazil	Hard	(Netherlands) Jolanda Mens	2–6, 6–4, 2–6
Win	5.	19 August 2002	ITF Asunción, Paraguay	Clay	(Argentina) Celeste Contín	6–1, 6–1
Win	6.	10 March 2003	ITF Matamoros, Mexico	Hard	(Brazil) Joana Cortez	3–6, 6–4, 6–2
Loss	4.	17 March 2003	ITF Monterrey, Mexico	Hard	(France) Kildine Chevalier	6–3, 0–6, 3–6
Win	7.	24 March 2003	ITF Monterrey, Mexico	Hard	(Brazil) Joana Cortez	4–6, 7–6^{(7)}, 6–4
Win	8.	16 June 2003	ITF Poza Rica, Mexico	Hard	(Brazil) Carla Tiene	6–4, 7–5
Win	9.	30 June 2003	ITF Monterrey, Mexico	Hard	(Brazil) Carla Tiene	7–5, 6–3
Loss	5.	14 July 2003	ITF Campos do Jordão, Brazil	Hard	(Portugal) Frederica Piedade	3–6, 6–2, 4–6
Win	10.	21 June 2004	ITF Périgueux, France	Clay	(Sweden) Maria Wolfbrandt	6–3, 6–3
Win	11.	12 July 2004	ITF Campos do Jordão, Brazil	Hard	(Hungary) Katalin Marosi	7–5, 7–6^{(7)}
Win	12.	4 October 2004	ITF Juárez, Mexico	Clay	(Argentina) María José Argeri	7–5, 6–3
Win	13.	18 July 2005	ITF Campos do Jordão, Brazil	Hard	(Argentina) María José Argeri	6–3, 7–5
Win	14.	1 May 2007	ITF Los Mochis, Mexico	Hard	(United States) Irina Falconi	6–2, 6–0
Win	15.	7 May 2007	ITF Mazatlán, Mexico	Hard	(United States) Jennifer Elie	6–1, 6–4
Win	16.	14 May 2007	ITF Irapuato, Mexico	Hard	(Colombia) Viky Núñez Fuentes	6–3, 7–5
Loss	6.	25 June 2007	ITF Istanbul, Turkey	Hard	(Hungary) Kira Nagy	7–6, 5–7, 1–6
Loss	7.	30 July 2007	ITF Campos do Jordão, Brazil	Hard	(Brazil) Teliana Pereira	4–6, 2–6
Win	17.	1 September 2008	ITF Barueri, Brazil	Hard	(Brazil) Carla Tiene	6–3, 7–5
Win	18.	15 June 2009	ITF Belém, Brazil	Hard	(Brazil) Nathalia Rossi	6–3, 6–3
Loss	8.	27 July 2009	ITF Campos do Jordão, Brazil	Hard	(Bolivia) María Fernanda Álvarez	3–6, 3–6
Loss	9.	8 March 2010	ITF Metepec, Mexico	Hard	(United States) Macall Harkins	1–6, 3–6
Loss	10.	11 October 2010	ITF Lima, Peru	Clay	(Argentina) Lucía Jara Lozano	7–6, 3–6, 3–6
Loss	11.	13 June 2011	ITF Bethany Beach, United States	Clay	(United States) Lena Litvak	6–7, 6–4, 3–6
Win	19.	27 June 2011	ITF São José dos Campos, Brazil	Clay	(Brazil) Nathaly Kurata	6–4, 7–5
Win	20.	1 August 2011	ITF São Paulo, Brazil	Hard	(Brazil) Beatriz Haddad Maia	4–6, 7–5, 6–3
Win	21.	22 August 2011	ITF Mogi das Cruzes, Brazil	Clay	(Brazil) Nathalia Rossi	6–1, 6–4
Loss	12.	10 October 2011	ITF São Paulo, Brazil	Clay	(Argentina) Carolina Zeballos	4–6, 4–6
Win	22.	17 October 2011	ITF Goiânia, Brazil	Clay	(Argentina) Carla Lucero	6–2, 6–4
Loss	13.	20 August 2012	ITF Lima, Peru	Clay	(Peru) Patricia Kú Flores	4–6, 4–6
Loss	14.	10 September 2012	ITF São José dos Campos, Brazil	Clay	(Brazil) Laura Pigossi	2–6, 6–0, 5–7
Loss	15.	1 October 2012	ITF Gainesville, United States	Clay	(Bolivia) María Fernanda Álvarez	6–2, 0–6, 5–7
Win	23.	21 January 2013	ITF Lima, Peru	Clay	(Sweden) Hilda Melander	6–2, 6–2
Loss	16.	31 March 2014	ITF São José dos Campos, Brazil	Clay	(Brazil) Paula Cristina Gonçalves	2–6, 6–3, 2–6
Loss	17.	23 March 2015	ITF Metepec, Mexico	Hard	(Mexico) Marcela Zacarías	4–6, 5–7

=== Doubles: 104 (58 titles, 46 runner-ups) ===
Result	No.	Date	Tournament	Surface	Partner	Opponents	Score
Loss	1.	30 April 2001	ITF Florianópolis, Brazil	Clay	(Brazil) Tassia Sono	(Uruguay) Ana Lucía Migliarini de León (Uruguay) Claudia Salgues	3–6, 6–3, 4–6
Win	1.	25 June 2001	ITF Elvas, Portugal	Hard	(Portugal) Ana Catarina Nogueira	(Ukraine) Oleksandra Kravets (Spain) Arantxa Parra Santonja	6–3, 6–4
Win	2.	6 August 2001	ITF Lima, Peru	Clay	(Brazil) Carla Tiene	(Bolivia) Daniela Álvarez (Uruguay) Ana Lucía Migliarini de León	0–6, 6–3, 6–2
Win	3.	27 August 2001	ITF Asunción, Paraguay	Clay	(Brazil) Carla Tiene	(Argentina) Natalia Gussoni (Uruguay) Claudia Salgues	2–6, 6–3, 6–3
Win	4.	25 November 2001	ITF Cali, Colombia	Clay	(Brazil) Livia Azzi	(Ecuador) Mariana Correa (Colombia) Romy Farah	7–5, 6–1
Loss	2.	6 April 2002	ITF Monterrey, Mexico	Hard	(Russia) Olga Kalyuzhnaya	(Argentina) Melisa Arévalo (Brazil) Vanessa Menga	2–6, 1–6
Loss	3.	6 April 2002	ITF Belo Horizonte, Brazil	Hard	(Brazil) Vanessa Menga	(Argentina) Celeste Contín (Argentina) Romina Ottoboni	4–6, 6–2, 5–7
Win	5.	5 August 2002	ITF Rimini, Italy	Clay	(Brazil) Carla Tiene	(Slovakia) Eva Fislová (Slovakia) Stanislava Hrozenská	6–4, 6–4
Loss	4.	12 August 2002	ITF Aosta, Italy	Clay	(Romania) Andreea Ehritt-Vanc	(Serbia and Montenegro) Katarina Mišić (Serbia and Montenegro) Dragana Zarić	5–7, 6–7
Win	6.	10 March 2003	ITF Matamoros, Mexico	Hard	(Argentina) Melisa Arévalo	(Brazil) Joana Cortez (Brazil) Carla Tiene	6–0, 7–5
Loss	5.	9 June 2003	ITF Hamilton, Canada	Clay	(Canada) Aneta Soukup	(United States) Alyssa Cohen (Canada) Diana Srebrovic	1–6, 6–3, 3–6
Loss	6.	16 June 2003	ITF Poza Rica, Mexico	Hard	(Argentina) Melisa Arévalo	(Argentina) Florencia Rivolta (Brazil) Carla Tiene	3–6, 3–6
Loss	7.	23 June 2003	ITF Victoria, Mexico	Hard	(Brazil) Carla Tiene	(Argentina) Soledad Esperón (Argentina) Flavia Mignola	7–5, 6–7, 5–7
Win	7.	30 June 2003	ITF Monterrey, Mexico	Hard	(Brazil) Carla Tiene	(Argentina) Melisa Arévalo (Argentina) Micaela Moran	7–6^{(7)}, 6–2
Win	8.	14 July 2003	ITF Campos do Jordão, Brazil	Hard	(Brazil) Carla Tiene	(Argentina) Melisa Arévalo (Portugal) Frederica Piedade	7–6^{(7)}, 6–2
Win	9.	22 September 2003	ITF Raleigh, United States	Clay	(United States) Tiffany Dabek	(Canada) Maureen Drake (Romania) Edina Gallovits-Hall	2–6, 6–3, 6–1
Loss	8.	10 November 2003	ITF Mexico City	Hard	(Brazil) Carla Tiene	(Brazil) Bruna Colósio (Brazil) Joana Cortez	6–1, 3–6, 1–6
Win	10.	29 March 2004	ITF Rabat, Morocco	Clay	(Brazil) Carla Tiene	(Austria) Daniela Klemenschits (Austria) Sandra Klemenschits	6–1, 7–6^{(7)}
Win	11.	21 June 2004	ITF Périgueux, France	Clay	(Argentina) Natalia Gussoni	(Canada) Erica Biro (United States) Sarah Riske	6–1, 6–2
Win	12.	4 October 2004	ITF Juárez, Mexico	Clay	(Brazil) Carla Tiene	(Czech Republic) Andrea Hlaváčková (Czech Republic) Jana Hlaváčková	6–4, 6–0
Loss	9.	1 May 2005	ITF Lafayette, United States	Clay	(Canada) Marie-Ève Pelletier	(Australia) Beti Sekulovski (Australia) Cindy Watson	6–4, 4–6, 3–6
Loss	10.	8 May 2005	ITF Raleigh, United States	Clay	(Canada) Stéphanie Dubois	(United States) Ashley Harkleroad (United States) Lindsay Lee-Waters	2–6, 6–0, 3–6
Loss	11.	12 June 2005	Open de Marseille, France	Clay	(Canada) Marie-Ève Pelletier	(Latvia) Līga Dekmeijere (France) Caroline Dhenin	2–6, 6–1, 2–6
Loss	12.	18 July 2005	ITF Campos do Jordão, Brazil	Hard	(Portugal) Frederica Piedade	(Brazil) Letícia Sobral (Argentina) María José Argeri	0–6, 2–6
Loss	13.	27 September 2005	ITF Ashland, United States	Hard	(United States) Ahsha Rolle	(United States) Teryn Ashley (United States) Amy Frazier	1–6, 4–6
Loss	14.	15 November 2005	ITF Tucson, United States	Hard	(Hungary) Melinda Czink	(Belarus) Victoria Azarenka (Belarus) Tatiana Poutchek	6–4, 6–7, 1–6
Winner	13.	31 January 2006	ITF Rockford, United States	Hard	(Argentina) María Emilia Salerni	(Czech Republic) Michaela Paštiková (United States) Abigail Spears	0–6, 6–4, 6–2
Loss	15.	28 February 2006	Las Vegas Open, United States	Hard	(Ukraine) Tatiana Perebiynis	(Australia) Casey Dellacqua (Australia) Nicole Pratt	w/o
Loss	16.	2 May 2006	ITF Charlottesville, United States	Clay	(United States) Lilia Osterloh	(Canada) Marie-Ève Pelletier (United States) Sunitha Rao	7–6^{(6)}, 2–6, 3–6
Loss	17.	14 May 2006	ITF Indian Harbour Beach, United States	Clay	(Canada) Marie-Ève Pelletier	(Romania) Edina Gallovits-Hall (United States) Jessica Kirkland	3–6, 2–6
Loss	18.	31 October 2006	ITF Mexico City	Hard	(South Africa) Chanelle Scheepers	(Argentina) María José Argeri (Brazil) Letícia Sobral	3–6, 5–7
Winner	14.	21 November 2006	ITF Puebla, Mexico	Hard	(Czech Republic) Hana Šromová	(Croatia) Ivana Abramović (Croatia) Maria Abramović	6–4, 6–3
Win	15.	13 March 2007	ITF Mérida, Mexico	Hard	(Argentina) Vanina García Sokol	(South Africa) Chanelle Scheepers (United States) Robin Stephenson	6–3, 6–2
Win	16.	21 May 2007	ITF Los Mochis, Mexico	Hard	(United States) Jennifer Elie	(United Kingdom) Danielle Brown (United Kingdom) Emily Webley-Smith	6–3, 6–0
Win	17.	21 May 2007	ITF Monterrey, Mexico	Hard	(United States) Courtney Nagle	(Mexico) Lorena Arias (Mexico) Erika Clarke	6–4, 6–4
Win	18.	24 September 2007	ITF Ashland, United States	Hard	(Czech Republic) Eva Hrdinová	(Estonia) Maret Ani (Germany) Sandra Klösel	7–6^{(5)}, 6–2
Loss	19.	5 November 2007	ITF Toronto, Canada	Hard	(Australia) Christina Wheeler	(Canada) Gabriela Dabrowski (Canada) Sharon Fichman	3–6, 0–6
Loss	20.	14 January 2008	ITF Surprise, United States	Hard	(Argentina) Betina Jozami	(United States) Carly Gullickson (United States) Shenay Perry	4–6, 5–7
Win	19.	27 January 2008	ITF Waikoloa Village, United States	Hard	(Argentina) Betina Jozami	(United States) Angela Haynes (United States) Mashona Washington	7–5, 6–4
Win	20.	6 October 2008	ITF Palm Beach Gardens, United States	Clay	(Czech Republic) Michaela Paštiková	(Russia) Ekaterina Afinogenova (United States) Lauren Albanese	3–6, 6–3, [10–5]
Loss	21.	27 April 2008	Dothan Pro Classic, United States	Clay	(Canada) Stéphanie Dubois	(United States) Tetiana Luzhanska (Czech Republic) Michaela Paštiková	1–6, 3–6
Loss	22.	30 May 2008	ITF Galatina, Italy	Clay	(Argentina) María Irigoyen	(Austria) Melanie Klaffner (Australia) Jessica Moore	6–3, 1–6, [6–10]
Win	21.	1 September 2008	ITF Barueri, Brazil	Hard	(Brazil) Carla Tiene	(Brazil) Ana Clara Duarte (Brazil) Fernanda Hermenegildo	6–2, 6–3
Win	22.	6 October 2008	ITF San Luis Potosí, Mexico	Hard	(Portugal) Frederica Piedade	(Argentina) Soledad Esperón (Argentina) Florencia Molinero	5–7, 6–1, [10–8]
Loss	23.	23 March 2009	ITF Metepec, Mexico	Hard	(United States) Jennifer Elie	(Slovakia) Dominika Diešková (Czech Republic) Kateřina Kramperová	1–6, 6–7
Loss	24.	13 April 2009	ITF Buenos Aires, Argentina	Clay	(Brazil) Carla Tiene	(Argentina) Mailen Auroux (Argentina) Veronica Spiegel	2–6, 2–6
Loss	25.	20 April 2009	ITF Buenos Aires, Argentina	Clay	(Brazil) Carla Tiene	(Argentina) Luciana Sarmenti (Argentina) Emilia Yorio	6–7, 4–6
Win	23.	27 April 2009	ITF Buenos Aires, Argentina	Clay	(Brazil) Carla Tiene	(Colombia) Karen Castiblanco (Chile) Andrea Koch Benvenuto	6–3, 6–3
Loss	26.	8 June 2009	ITF El Paso, United States	Hard	(United States) Tetiana Luzhanska	(United States) Christina Fusano (India) Shikha Uberoi	3–6, 5–7
Win	24.	15 June 2009	ITF Belém, Brazil	Hard	(Brazil) Carla Tiene	(Brazil) Ana Clara Duarte (United States) Megan Moulton-Levy	7–6^{(7)}, 7–5
Win	25.	29 June 2009	ITF Baston, United States	Hard	(United States) Ahsha Rolle	(United States) Mallory Cecil (United States) Megan Moulton-Levy	6–1, 4–6, [10–6]
Loss	27.	18 July 2009	ITF Bogotá, Colombia	Clay	(Italy) Nicole Clerico	(Colombia) Karen Castiblanco (Colombia) Paula Zabala	6–1, 1–6, [7–10]
Loss	28.	23 November 2009	ITF Puebla, Mexico	Hard	(Argentina) Florencia Molinero	(United States) Amanda Fink (United States) Elizabeth Lumpkin	4–6, 7–6, [8–10]
Win	26.	30 November 2009	ITF Poza Rica, Mexico	Clay	(Colombia) Paula Zabala	(Italy) Alessia Camplone (Belarus) Viktoryia Kisialeva	6–2, 6–0
Loss	29.	18 January 2010	ITF Lutz, United States	Clay	(Argentina) Florencia Molinero	(France) Aurélie Védy (United States) Mashona Washington	3–6, 3–6
Loss	30.	8 March 2010	ITF Metepec, Mexico	Clay	(Mexico) Daniela Múñoz Gallegos	(United States) Amanda Fink (United States) Elizabeth Lumpkin	3–6, 7–5, [8–10]
Win	27.	10 April 2010	ITF Jackson, United States	Clay	(Brazil) Ana Clara Duarte	(Argentina) María Irigoyen (Argentina) Florencia Molinero	6–4, 3–6, [10–5]
Win	28.	10 May 2010	ITF Rio de Janeiro, Brazil	Clay	(Argentina) Florencia Molinero	(Argentina) Mailen Auroux (Brazil) Fernanda Hermenegildo	6–2, 6–4
Win	29.	20 May 2010	ITF İzmir, Turkey	Hard	(Austria) Tamira Paszek	(Turkey) Çağla Büyükakçay (Turkey) Pemra Özgen	6–1, 6–2
Loss	31.	13 September 2010	ITF Itapema, Brazil	Clay	(Brazil) Natalia Cheng	(Brazil) Monique Albuquerque (Brazil) Roxane Vaisemberg	3–6, 3–6
Loss	32.	20 September 2010	ITF Mogi das Cruzes, Brazil	Clay	(Brazil) Natasha Lotuffo	(Brazil) Flávia Guimarães Bueno (Brazil) Beatriz Haddad Maia	1–6, 3–6
Win	30.	11 October 2010	ITF Lima, Peru	Clay	(Brazil) Isabela Miró	(Colombia) Karen Castiblanco (Chile) Andrea Koch Benvenuto	6–4, 6–4
Win	31.	18 October 2010	ITF Rock Hill, United States	Clay	(Colombia) Mariana Duque Mariño	(United States) Sanaz Marand (United States) Caitlin Whoriskey	6–1, 4–6, [10–4]
Win	32.	30 October 2010	ITF Bayamón, Puerto Rico	Hard	(Canada) Marie-Ève Pelletier	(Argentina) María Irigoyen (Argentina) Florencia Molinero	7–6^{(5)}, 6–4
Win	33.	15 November 2010	ITF Niterói, Brazil	Clay	(Brazil) Ana Clara Duarte	(Brazil) Monique Albuquerque (Brazil) Fernanda Hermenegildo	6–4, 6–4
Win	34.	4 December 2010	ITF Rio de Janeiro, Brazil	Clay	(Brazil) Ana Clara Duarte	(France) Alizé Lim (Argentina) Paula Ormaechea	w/o
Win	35.	18 March 2011	ITF Santiago, Chile	Clay	(Argentina) Paula Ormaechea	(Argentina) Barbara Rush (Argentina) Carolina Zeballos	6–3, 7–6^{(2)}
Loss	33.	13 June 2011	ITF Bethany Beach, United States	Clay	(Russia) Angelina Gabueva	(United States) Alexandra Hirsch (United States) Lena Litvak	5–7, 6–3, 4–6
Win	36.	27 June 2011	ITF São José dos Campos, Brazil	Clay	(Brazil) Carla Forte	(Brazil) Monique Albuquerque (Brazil) Fernanda Faria	6–4, 0–6, 6–4
Loss	34.	30 July 2011	ITF Campos do Jordão, Brazil	Hard	(Brazil) Roxane Vaisemberg	(Brazil) Fernanda Hermenegildo (Brazil) Teliana Pereira	6–3, 6–7^{(5)}, [9–11]
Win	37.	8 August 2011	ITF São Paulo, Brazil	Clay	(Brazil) Fernanda Hermenegildo	(Brazil) Eduarda Piai (Brazil) Karina Venditti	7–6^{(6)}, 4–6, [14–12]
Win	38.	5 September 2011	ITF Alice Springs, Australia	Hard	(United Kingdom) Samantha Murray	(Australia) Brooke Rischbieth (Australia) Storm Sanders	3–6, 7–5, [10–3]
Loss	35.	12 September 2011	ITF Cairns, Australia	Hard	(United Kingdom) Samantha Murray	(Indonesia) Ayu Fani Damayanti (Indonesia) Jessy Rompies	3–6, 3–6
Win	39.	19 September 2011	ITF Darwin, Australia	Hard	(United Kingdom) Samantha Murray	(Australia) Stephanie Bengson (Australia) Tyra Calderwood	6–4, 6–2
Win	40.	10 October 2011	ITF São Paulo, Brazil	Clay	(Brazil) Gabriela Cé	(Brazil) Flavia Dechandt Araujo (Brazil) Paula Cristina Gonçalves	6–2, 6–4
Win	41.	10 October 2011	ITF São Paulo, Brazil	Clay	(Brazil) Karina Venditti	(Brazil) Gabriela Cé (Chile) Cecilia Costa Melgar	6–2, 6–4
Loss	36.	17 October 2011	ITF Goiânia, Brazil	Clay	(Brazil) Gabriela Cé	(Paraguay) Jazmin Britos (Argentina) Carla Lucero	6–0, 4–6, 4–6
Win	42.	30 April 2012	ITF Indian Harbour Beach, United States	Clay	(Australia) Jessica Moore	(Canada) Marie-Ève Pelletier (Ukraine) Alyona Sotnikova	6–7^{(6)}, 6–3, [10–8]
Win	43.	16 July 2012	ITF Campos do Jordão, Brazil	Hard	(Australia) Monique Adamczak	(Brazil) Paula Cristina Gonçalves (Brazil) Roxane Vaisemberg	4–6, 6–3, [10–3]
Win	44.	10 September 2012	ITF São José dos Campos, Brazil	Clay	(Brazil) Laura Pigossi	(Brazil) Paula Feitosa (Brazil) Nathalia Rossi	6–0, 6–3
Win	45.	24 September 2012	ITF Amelia Island, United States	Clay	(Bolivia) María Fernanda Álvarez	(United States) Elizabeth Ferris (Ukraine) Anastasia Kharchenko	6–2, 6–2
Loss	37.	29 October 2012	ITF Buenos Aires, Argentina	Clay	(Bolivia) María Fernanda Álvarez	(Romania) Elena Bogdan (Romania) Raluca Olaru	6–1, 2–6, [7–10]
Win	46.	21 January 2013	ITF Lima, Peru	Clay	(Argentina) Vanesa Furlanetto	(Peru) Patricia Kú Flores (Peru) Katherine Miranda Chang	6–1, 6–4
Loss	38.	4 February 2013	Midland Tennis Classic, United States	Hard (i)	(United Kingdom) Samantha Murray	(Hungary) Melinda Czink (Croatia) Mirjana Lučić-Baroni	7–5, 4–6, [7–10]
Win	47.	8 April 2013	ITF Poza Rica, Mexico	Hard	(Bolivia) María Fernanda Álvarez	(Canada) Stéphanie Dubois (Ukraine) Olga Savchuk	6–2, 6–3
Loss	39.	30 July 2013	ITF Campos do Jordão, Brazil	Hard	(Bolivia) María Fernanda Álvarez	(Brazil) Paula Cristina Gonçalves (Argentina) María Irigoyen	5–7, 3–6
Win	48.	29 September 2013	ITF Amelia Island, United States	Clay	(United States) Alexandra Mueller	(United States) Roxanne Ellison (United States) Sierra Ellison	7–5, 6–3
Win	49.	24 March 2014	ITF Ribeirão Preto, Brazil	Clay	(Brazil) Ana Clara Duarte	(Brazil) Gabriela Cé (Brazil) Eduarda Piai	6–4, 4–6, [11–9]
Win	50.	31 March 2014	ITF São José dos Campos, Brazil	Clay	(Brazil) Paula Cristina Gonçalves	(Brazil) Gabriela Cé (Brazil) Eduarda Piai	7–6^{(0)}, 7–5
Win	51.	7 April 2014	ITF São José do Rio Preto, Brazil	Clay	(Brazil) Paula Cristina Gonçalves	(Brazil) Carolina Alves (Brazil) Ingrid Martins	6–2, 6–0
Loss	40.	24 August 2014	ITF Winnipeg, Canada	Hard	(United States) Anamika Bhargava	(Canada) Rosie Johanson (Canada) Charlotte Petrick	3–6, 3–6
Win	52.	22 September 2014	ITF Amelia Island, United States	Clay	(United States) Keri Wong	(United States) Sophie Chang (United States) Andie Daniell	7–6^{(6)}, 7–6^{(4)}
Win	53.	29 September 2014	ITF Hilton Head, United States	Clay	(United States) Keri Wong	(United States) Emily Harman (United States) Madeleine Kobelt	6–1, 7–6^{(5)}
Win	54.	25 October 2014	ITF Victoria, Mexico	Hard	(Romania) Patricia Maria Țig	(Mexico) Carolina Betancourt (Slovakia) Lenka Wienerová	6–1, 6–2
Win	55.	23 March 2015	ITF Metepec, Mexico	Hard	(United States) Kaitlyn Christian	(Mexico) Victoria Rodríguez (Mexico) Marcela Zacarías	2–6, 6–1, [15–13]
Win	56.	6 April 2015	ITF León, Mexico	Hard	(United States) Danielle Lao	(Germany) Kim Grajdek (Japan) Mayo Hibi	5–7, 7–6^{(5)}, [10–4]
Loss	41.	24 April 2015	ITF Guadalajara, Mexico	Hard	(Mexico) Renata Zarazúa	(Mexico) Marcela Zacarías (Brazil) Laura Pigossi	1–6, 2–6
Loss	42.	4 May 2015	ITF Puszczykowo, Poland	Hard	(Slovakia) Zuzana Zlochová	(Russia) Margarita Lazareva (Philippines) Katharina Lehnert	3–6, 3–6
Loss	43.	25 May 2015	ITF Bol, Croatia	Clay	(Argentina) Ailen Crespo Azconzábal	(Croatia) Tena Lukas (Croatia) Iva Primorac	6–4, 1–6, [7–10]
Win	57.	14 June 2015	ITF Charlotte, United States	Hard	(Mexico) Renata Zarazúa	(United States) Lauren Herring (Australia) Ellen Perez	6–4, 6–7^{(6)}, [10–8]
Loss	44.	24 August 2015	ITF San Luis Potosí, Mexico	Hard	(Brazil) Laura Pigossi	(Paraguay) Montserrat González (Mexico) Ana Sofía Sánchez	6–4, 3–6, [8–10]
Win	58.	16 May 2016	ITF Galați, Romania	Clay	(Argentina) Guadalupe Pérez Rojas	(Armenia) Ani Amiraghyan (Moldova) Alexandra Perper	6–4, 2–6, [10–8]
Loss	45.	23 May 2016	ITF Galați, Romania	Clay	(Argentina) Guadalupe Pérez Rojas	(Moldova) Alexandra Perper (Moldova) Anastasia Vdovenco	3–6, 3–6
Loss	46.	29 July 2016	ITF Campos do Jordão, Brazil	Hard	(Brazil) Luisa Stefani	(Brazil) Ingrid Martins (Brazil) Laura Pigossi	3–6, 6–3, [8–10]
