= Letícia Sobral =

Brazilian tennis player

- Country (sports): Brazil
- Born: 6 December 1980 (age 45) Rio de Janeiro, Brazil
- Prize money: $84,960

Singles
- Career record: 178–181
- Career titles: 1 ITF
- Highest ranking: No. 284 (13 February 2006)

Doubles
- Career record: 215–135
- Career titles: 25 ITF
- Highest ranking: No. 105 (22 May 2006)

Team competitions
- Fed Cup: 3–1

Letícia Sobral (born 6 December 1980) is a former professional tennis player from Brazil.

== Biography ==
Born in Rio de Janeiro, Sobral began competing on the ITF Circuit in the late 1990s and went on to win 25 doubles titles, the first in 2003.

With a best doubles ranking of 105 in the world, she featured in the main draw of several WTA Tour events from 2005 to 2007, all with regular partner María José Argeri.

In 2006, she appeared in four Fed Cup ties for Brazil, winning all three of her completed doubles matches.

Sobral is now based in São Paulo and works as a tennis coach.

== ITF finals ==
$100,000 tournaments
$75,000 tournaments
$50,000 tournaments
$25,000 tournaments
$10,000 tournaments

=== Singles: 4 (1–3) ===
Outcome	No.	Date	Tournament	Surface	Opponent	Score
Runner-up	1.	2 December 2001	Cali, Colombia	Clay	(Argentina) Sabrina Eisenberg	6–7^{(5)}, 4–6
Runner-up	2.	29 June 2003	Victoria, Mexico	Hard	(Brazil) Carla Tiene	6–4, 1–6, 4–6
Winner	3.	24 August 2003	La Paz, Bolivia	Clay	(Brazil) Jenifer Widjaja	6–2, 6–3
Runner-up	4.	26 October 2003	Caracas, Venezuela	Hard	(Brazil) Larissa Carvalho	3–6, 5–7

=== Doubles: 40 (25–15) ===
Outcome	No.	Date	Tournament	Surface	Partner	Opponents	Score
Runner-up	1.	1 May 2000	Itajaí, Brazil	Hard	(Brazil) Nathalia Bellizia	(Argentina) Jorgelina Cravero (Uruguay) Claudia Salgues	3–6, 2–6
Runner-up	2.	1 April 2001	Santiago, Chile	Clay	(Brazil) Marcela Evangelista	(Argentina) Celeste Contín (Argentina) Romina Ottoboni	1–6, 3–6
Runner-up	3.	22 April 2001	Belo Horizonte, Brazil	Hard	(Brazil) Marcela Evangelista	(Brazil) Tassia Sono (Brazil) Carla Tiene	2–6, 3–6
Runner-up	4.	10 June 2001	Durban, South Africa	Hard	(Brazil) Marcela Evangelista	(South Africa) Chanelle Scheepers (South Africa) Lara van Rooyen	2–6, 2–6
Runner-up	5.	9 September 2001	Montevideo, Uruguay	Clay	(Brazil) Marcela Evangelista	(Argentina) Jorgelina Barrera (Argentina) Salome Llaguno	2–6, 7–6^{(4)}, 4–6
Runner-up	6.	28 July 2002	Caracas, Venezuela	Hard	(Brazil) Marcela Evangelista	(Mexico) Alejandra Rivero (Spain) Regina Temez	6–4, 1–6, 1–6
Runner-up	7.	1 October 2002	Mexicali, Mexico	Hard	(Brazil) Marcela Evangelista	(Argentina) Celeste Contín (Uruguay) Ana Lucía Migliarini de León	4–6, 2–6
Runner-up	8.	17 November 2002	Florianópolis, Brazil	Clay	(Brazil) Marcela Evangelista	(Brazil) Larissa Carvalho (Brazil) Bruna Colósio	4–6, 4–6
Winner	9.	24 August 2003	La Paz, Bolivia	Clay	(Brazil) Marcela Evangelista	(Chile) Valentina Castro (Chile) Andrea Koch Benvenuto	3–6, 6–3, 1–0 ret.
Winner	10.	8 September 2003	Santiago, Chile	Clay	(Argentina) María José Argeri	(Argentina) Andrea Benítez (Argentina) Virginia Donda	6–2, 6–2
Runner-up	11.	26 October 2003	Caracas, Venezuela	Hard	(Argentina) María José Argeri	(Czech Republic) Zuzana Černá (Czech Republic) Eva Hrdinová	w/o
Winner	12.	23 February 2004	Las Palmas, Spain	Clay	(Argentina) María José Argeri	(Hungary) Eszter Molnár (Sweden) Maria Wolfbrandt	6–3, 6–3
Winner	13.	25 May 2004	Campobasso, Italy	Clay	(Argentina) María José Argeri	(Italy) Emilia Desiderio (Italy) Claudia Ivone	6–0, 6–1
Winner	14.	9 August 2004	Caracas, Venezuela	Hard	(Argentina) María José Argeri	(Brazil) Marcela Evangelista (Brazil) Carla Tiene	6–4, 6–3
Winner	15.	16 August 2004	Guayaquil, Ecuador	Hard	(Argentina) María José Argeri	(Brazil) Marcela Evangelista (Brazil) Carla Tiene	6–3, 6–1
Winner	16.	23 August 2004	La Paz, Bolivia	Clay	(Argentina) María José Argeri	(Brazil) Marcela Evangelista (Brazil) Carla Tiene	6–1, 6–3
Winner	17.	6 September 2004	Santiago, Chile	Clay	(Argentina) María José Argeri	(Brazil) Bruna Colosio (Uruguay) Ana Lucía Migliarini de León	6–2, 6–0
Winner	18.	18 October 2004	Goiânia, Brazil	Clay	(Argentina) María José Argeri	(Brazil) Joana Cortez (Brazil) Marcela Evangelista	6–3, 6–3
Winner	19.	24 October 2004	Florianapolis, Brazil	Clay	(Argentina) María José Argeri	(Brazil) Larissa Carvalho (Brazil) Jenifer Widjaja	2–6, 6–4, 7–5
Winner	20.	4 April 2005	Porto, Portugal	Hard	(Argentina) María José Argeri	(Germany) Annette Kolb (Germany) Laura Zelder	7–6^{(6)}, 6–1
Winner	21.	11 April 2005	Porto, Portugal	Hard	(Argentina) María José Argeri	(Netherlands) Lisanne Balk (South Africa) Surina De Beer	6–4, 4–6, 7–6^{(13)}
Runner-up	22.	15 May 2005	Saint-Gaudens, France	Clay	(Argentina) María José Argeri	(United Kingdom) Claire Curran (South Africa) Natalie Grandin	3–6, 1–6
Runner-up	23.	5 June 2005	Nanjing, China	Hard	(Argentina) María José Argeri	(Chinese Taipei) Chuang Chia-jung (China) Xie Yanze	3–6, 7–6^{(5)}, 2–6
Winner	24.	4 July 2005	College Park, United States	Hard	(Argentina) María José Argeri	(United States) Ashley Harkleroad (Bulgaria) Svetlana Krivencheva	6–4, 3–6, 7–6^{(1)}
Winner	25.	18 July 2005	Campos do Jordão, Brazil	Hard	(Argentina) María José Argeri	(Brazil) Maria Fernanda Alves (Portugal) Frederica Piedade	6–0, 6–2
Winner	26.	4 October 2005	Ciudad Juárez, Mexico	Clay	(Argentina) María José Argeri	(Argentina) Soledad Esperón (Czech Republic) Olga Vymetálková	7–6^{(1)}, 6–3
Winner	27.	11 October 2005	Ciudad Victoria, Mexico	Hard	(Argentina) María José Argeri	(Argentina) Soledad Esperón (Italy) Valentina Sassi	6–3, 6–4
Winner	28.	18 October 2005	Mexico City	Hard	(Argentina) María José Argeri	(Argentina) Soledad Esperón (Republic of Ireland) Kelly Liggan	7–6^{(2)}, 2–6, 6–0
Runner-up	29.	7 February 2006	Midland, United States	Hard (i)	(Argentina) María José Argeri	(Venezuela) Milagros Sequera (United States) Meilen Tu	6–4, 5–7, 4–6
Winner	30.	4 April 2006	Coatzacoalcos, Mexico	Hard	(Argentina) María José Argeri	(Brazil) Carla Tiene (Brazil) Jenifer Widjaja	6–4, 7–5
Runner-up	31.	8 May 2006	Jounieh, Lebanon	Clay	(Argentina) María José Argeri	(Belarus) Tatiana Poutchek (Belarus) Anastasiya Yakimova	4–6, 6–7^{(5)}
Runner-up	32.	15 May 2006	Saint-Gaudens, France	Clay	(Argentina) María José Argeri	(Croatia) Ivana Abramović (Russia) Alla Kudryavtseva	2–6, 0–6
Winner	33.	16 July 2006	Campos do Jordão, Brazil	Hard	(Argentina) María José Argeri	(Brazil) Carla Tiene (Brazil) Jenifer Widjaja	6–3, 6–3
Winner	34.	31 July 2006	Vigo, Spain	Hard	(Argentina) María José Argeri	(Brazil) Larissa Carvalho (Brazil) Joana Cortez	6–4, 6–3
Winner	35.	8 August 2006	Coimbra, Portugal	Hard	(Argentina) María José Argeri	(Brazil) Joana Cortez (Portugal) Neuza Silva	7–6^{(4)}, 7–6^{(5)}
Winner	36.	31 October 2006	Mexico City	Hard	(Argentina) María José Argeri	(Brazil) Maria Fernanda Alves (South Africa) Chanelle Scheepers	6–3, 7–5
Winner	37.	7 November 2006	Mexico City	Hard	(Argentina) María José Argeri	(Austria) Patricia Mayr-Achleitner (Austria) Yvonne Meusburger	6–4, 6–2
Winner	38.	11 June 2007	Campobasso, Italy	Clay	(Argentina) María José Argeri	(United States) Story Tweedie-Yates (Australia) Christina Wheeler	7–5, 6–3
Runner-up	39.	30 July 2007	Campos do Jordão, Brazil	Hard	(Argentina) María José Argeri	(Brazil) Joana Cortez (Brazil) Roxane Vaisemberg	5–7, 0–6
Winner	40.	3 September 2007	Barueri, Brazil	Hard	(Brazil) Fabiana Chiaparini	(Argentina) Soledad Esperón (Argentina) María Irigoyen	6–7^{(4)}, 6–4, [11–9]
