= Ivana Abramović =

Croatian tennis player (born 1983)

- Country (sports): Croatia
- Residence: Zagreb, Croatia
- Born: 3 September 1983 (age 41); Zagreb, SR Croatia, Yugoslavia
- Height: 1.74 m (5 ft 8 1/2 in)
- Turned pro: 1999
- Retired: 2010
- Plays: Right (two-handed backhand)
- Prize money: $193,921

Singles
- Career record: 206–197
- Career titles: 2 ITF
- Highest ranking: No. 143 (12 January 2004)

Grand Slam singles results
- Australian Open: Q3 (2006)
- French Open: Q2 (2004)
- Wimbledon: 1R (2006)
- US Open: Q2 (2003–2006)

Doubles
- Career record: 117–108
- Career titles: 7 ITF
- Highest ranking: No. 141 (29 January 2007)

Ivana Abramović (Croatian pronunciation: [ǐvana abrǎːmovitɕ]; born 3 September 1983) is a retired Croatian tennis player.

Her career-high WTA rankings are 143 in singles, achieved on 12 January 2004, and 141 in doubles, set on 29 January 2007. Her younger sister, Maria Abramović, also played tennis on ITF Women's Circuit and WTA Tour.

Abramović qualified for the singles draw at the 2006 Wimbledon Championships, and lost to eventual champion Amélie Mauresmo in the first round.

Competing for the Croatia Fed Cup team, she scored a win-loss record of 1–1.

== ITF finals ==
Legend
$50,000 tournaments
$25,000 tournaments
$10,000 tournaments

=== Singles (2–5) ===
Result	No.	Date	Location	Surface	Opponent	Score
Win	1.	20 May 2002	Rijeka, Croatia	Clay	(Bosnia and Herzegovina) Mervana Jugić-Salkić	6–3, 6–3
Win	2.	21 May 2002	Zadar, Croatia	Clay	(Slovakia) Lenka Tvarošková	2–6, 6–2, 7–5
Loss	1.	1 December 2002	Nonthaburi, Thailand	Hard	(Israel) Tzipora Obziler	4–6, 4–6
Loss	2.	18 May 2003	Bromma, Sweden	Clay	(Hungary) Melinda Czink	1–6, 2–6
Loss	3.	7 May 2005	Catania, Italy	Clay	(Australia) Jarmila Gajdošová	3–6, 5–7
Loss	4.	15 May 2006	Saint-Gaudens, France	Clay	(Switzerland) Timea Bacsinszky	5–7, 4–6
Loss	5.	29 November 2006	San Diego, United States	Hard	(Paraguay) Rossana de los Ríos	0–6, 2–6

=== Doubles (7–11) ===
Result	No.	Date	Location	Surface	Partner	Opponents	Score
Loss	1.	15 October 2001	Makarska, Croatia	Clay	(Italy) Raffaella Bindi	(Czech Republic) Petra Raclavská (Czech Republic) Blanka Kumbárová	4–6, 5–7
Win	1.	3 December 2001	Nonthaburi, Thailand	Hard	(South Korea) Kim Jin-hee	(South Korea) Jeon Mi-ra (India) Manisha Malhotra	6–1, 7–5
Loss	2.	8 January 2002	Tallahassee, United States	Hard	(United States) Jacqueline Trail	(United States) Jessica Lehnhoff (Canada) Vanessa Webb	4–6, 3–6
Loss	3.	4 March 2002	Makarska, Croatia	Clay	(Slovakia) Lenka Tvarošková	(Slovenia) Tina Hergold (Israel) Yevgenia Savransky	7–5, 3–6, 5–7
Win	2.	27 May 2002	Makarska, Croatia	Clay	(Australia) Jenny Belobrajdic	(Hungary) Zsuzsanna Fodor (Hungary) Dorottya Magas	6–4, 6–0
Win	3.	1 December 2002	Nonthaburi, Thailand	Hard	(Japan) Remi Tezuka	(United States) Amanda Augustus (Netherlands) Debby Haak	6–2, 6–1
Loss	4.	22 November 2004	San Luis Potosí, Mexico	Hard	(Croatia) Maria Abramović	(United Kingdom) Hannah Collin (United Kingdom) Karen Paterson	4–6, 6–2, 2–6
Loss	5.	21 March 2005	Rome, Italy	Clay	(Austria) Stefanie Haidner	(Italy) Valentina Sulpizio (Czech Republic) Sandra Záhlavová	5–7, 7–5, 1–6
Win	4.	15 November 2005	Puebla, Mexico	Hard	(Croatia) Maria Abramović	(Argentina) Betina Jozami (Argentina) Veronica Spiegel	6–4, 4–6, 6–7
Loss	6.	3 April 2006	Putignano, Italy	Hard	(Croatia) Maria Abramović	(Australia) Anastasia Rodionova (Russia) Arina Rodionova	6–1, 1–6, 5–7
Win	5.	15 May 2006	Saint-Gaudens, France	Clay	(Russia) Alla Kudryavtseva	(Argentina) María José Argeri (Argentina) Letícia Sobral	6–2, 6–0
Win	6.	31 July 2006	Martina Franca, Italy	Clay	(France) Aurélie Védy	(Romania) Edina Gallovits-Hall (Bosnia and Herzegovina) Mervana Jugić-Salkić	6–3, 6–2
Loss	7.	14 November 2006	Mexico City, Mexico	Clay	(Croatia) Maria Abramović	(Brazil) Larissa Carvalho (Brazil) Joana Cortez	5–7, 2–6
Loss	8.	21 November 2006	Puebla, Mexico	Hard	(Croatia) Maria Abramović	(Brazil) Maria Fernanda Alves (Czech Republic) Hana Šromová	4–6, 3–6
Win	7.	29 November 2006	San Diego, United States	Hard	(Czech Republic) Hana Šromová	(United States) Christina Fusano (United States) Aleke Tsoubanos	6–4, 6–3
Loss	9.	16 July 2007	Dnipropetrovsk, Ukraine	Clay	(Croatia) Maria Abramović	(Kazakhstan) Amina Rakhim (Russia) Arina Rodionova	5–7, 6–4, 2–6
Loss	10.	24 September 2007	Podgorica, Montenegro	Clay	(Croatia) Maria Abramović	(Montenegro) Danica Krstajić (Bosnia and Herzegovina) Sandra Martinović	1–6, 2–6
Loss	11.	22 October 2007	Mexico City, Mexico	Hard	(Croatia) Maria Abramović	(Netherlands) Arantxa Rus (Netherlands) Nicole Thyssen	0–6, 1–6
