= Marina Giral Lores =

Venezuelan tennis player

Marina Giral
- Full name: Marina Giral Lores
- Country (sports): Venezuela
- Born: 4 September 1990 (age 34); Maracaibo, Venezuela
- Plays: Right-handed
- Prize money: $37,888

Singles
- Career record: 138–77
- Career titles: 2 ITF
- Highest ranking: No. 283 (19 October 2009)

Doubles
- Career record: 37–47
- Career titles: 1 ITF
- Highest ranking: No. 629 (22 June 2009)

Team competitions
- Fed Cup: 7–1

Marina Giral Lores (Note: In this Spanish name, the first or paternal surname is Giral and the second or maternal family name is Lores.) (born 4 September 1990) is a Venezuelan former professional tennis player.

Born in Maracaibo, Giral Lores represented the Venezuela Fed Cup team in a total of eight ties between 2006 and 2011. She also represented her country at the 2007 Pan American Games.

On the professional tour, she reached a best singles ranking of No. 283 in the world and won two ITF titles, including a $25k tournament in 2009, the Open Bogotá.

Giral, who is based in Miami, retired from professional tennis in 2012.

== ITF Circuit finals ==
Legend
$25,000 tournaments
$10,000 tournaments

=== Singles: 12 (2 titles, 10 runner-ups) ===
Outcome	No.	Date	Location	Surface	Opponent	Score
Runner-up	1.	11 November 2006	ITF Caracas, Venezuela	Clay	(Brazil) Joana Cortez	5–7, 6–7^{(4)}
Runner-up	2.	30 July 2007	ITF Caracas, Venezuela	Hard	(Romania) Patricia Chirea	1–6, 4–6
Runner-up	3.	20 July 2008	ITF Cartagena, Colombia	Hard	(Brazil) Vivian Segnini	6–7^{(8)}, 2–6
Runner-up	4.	4 October 2008	ITF Curitiba, Brazil	Clay	(Brazil) Fernanda Hermenegildo	4–6, 6–1, 3–6
Runner-up	5.	25 October 2008	ITF Lima, Peru	Clay	(Argentina) Vanesa Furlanetto	4–6, 6–2, 4–6
Runner-up	6.	25 May 2009	ITF Villa María, Argentina	Clay	(Argentina) María Irigoyen	2–6, 6–7^{(6)}
Winner	1.	19 July 2009	Open Bogotá, Colombia	Clay	(Bolivia) María Fernanda Álvarez Terán	1–6, 6–4, 6–3
Runner-up	7.	11 October 2009	ITF Mexico City	Hard	(Portugal) Frederica Piedade	1–6, 2–6
Runner-up	8.	18 April 2011	ITF Torrent, Spain	Clay	(Spain) Garbiñe Muguruza	1–6, 3–6
Winner	2.	3 October 2011	ITF Madrid, Spain	Hard	(Spain) Nuria Párrizas Díaz	4–6, 6–4, 6–4
Runner-up	9.	16 January 2012	ITF Antalya, Turkey	Clay	(Georgia (country)) Sofia Kvatsabaia	6–7^{(4)}, 1–6
Runner-up	10.	16 April 2012	ITF Caracas, Venezuela	Hard	(United States) Jennifer Elie	4–6, 6–2, 4–6

=== Doubles: 5 (1 title, 4 runner-ups) ===
Outcome	No.	Date	Tournament	Surface	Partner	Opponents	Score
Runner-up	1.	1 August 2005	ITF Puerto Ordaz, Venezuela	Hard	(Cuba) Lumay Díaz Hernández	(Cuba) Yamile Fors Guerra (Cuba) Yanet Núñez Mojarena	1–6, 2–6
Runner-up	2.	21 October 2006	ITF Santiago, Chile	Clay	(Venezuela) Paola Iovino	(Brazil) Roxane Vaisemberg (Argentina) Jessica Orselli	4–6, 0–6
Winner	1.	11 November 2006	ITF Caracas, Venezuela	Clay	(Venezuela) Mariana Muci	(Brazil) Fabiana Mak (Brazil) Joana Cortez	4–6, 7–5, 7–5
Runner-up	3.	13 October 2008	ITF Lima, Peru	Clay	(Argentina) Paula Ormaechea	(Chile) Andrea Koch Benvenuto (Colombia) Karen Castiblanco	2–6, 1–6
Runner-up	4.	20 October 2008	ITF Lima, Peru	Clay	(Argentina) Paula Ormaechea	(Chile) Andrea Koch Benvenuto (Colombia) Karen Castiblanco	7–6^{(9–7)}, 0–6, [3–10]
