= Neuza Silva =

Portuguese tennis player (born 1983)

- Country (sports): Portugal
- Residence: Lisbon, Portugal
- Born: 4 May 1983 (age 42) Setúbal, Portugal
- Height: 1.70 m (5 ft 7 in)
- Turned pro: 1999
- Retired: 2010
- Plays: Right-handed (one-handed backhand)
- Prize money: $172,509

Singles
- Career record: 226–145
- Career titles: 12 ITF
- Highest ranking: No. 133 (6 July 2009)

Grand Slam singles results
- Australian Open: Q2 (2009)
- French Open: Q2 (2009)
- Wimbledon: 1R (2009)
- US Open: Q3 (2008)

Doubles
- Career record: 145–85
- Career titles: 18 ITF
- Highest ranking: No. 185 (6 July 2008)

Neuza Silva (born 4 May 1983) is a Portuguese former tennis player. Her career-high singles ranking is world No. 133, reached on 6 July 2009;, on 6 July 2008, she peaked at No. 185 in the doubles rankings. Silva regularly competed for the Portugal Fed Cup team with a total win–loss record of 16–6.

== Career ==
Silva debuted in the ITF Women's Circuit in Vila do Conde with a first-round loss. Her first high-level match came in 2002 at the Estoril Open, followed soon by her first presence in the Fed Cup. Both matches resulted in defeat.

Her greatest moment came at home at the 2004 Estoril Open when she defeated Julia Schruff, the previous year finalist, 3–6, 7–6, 7–6, to become the first Portuguese female player to win a singles match at the tournament. She then lost to fourth seed Denisa Chládková, in straight sets.

The year 2009 proved to be a breakthrough year for Silva. In February, she entered her first tour event outside of Portugal in Pattaya and reached the second round, defeating Jessica Moore 6–2, 6–1 before losing in two sets to home player and sixth seed, Tamarine Tanasugarn.

In May, at Estoril, she played first seed Iveta Benešová in the first round, losing in three sets. In doubles, with Alexandra Dulgheru, she reached the quarterfinals.

On 18 June 2009, Silva qualified for her first Grand Slam tournament at Wimbledon, where she lost to second seed Serena Williams, 1–6, 5–7 in the first round.

Her next WTA Tour event was the Tashkent Open in September, where she lost in the first round to eighth seed Galina Voskoboeva.

2010 was an injured filled year for Silva, who missed most of the season. Her last match came in June during the Wimbledon Championships qualifying tournament where she lost in the first round to Michaëlla Krajicek, in straight sets.

Citing constant pain in both of her knees, Silva retired on 12 September 2010.

== ITF Circuit finals ==
$25,000 tournaments
$10,000 tournaments

=== Singles: 20 (12 titles, 8 runner-ups) ===
Result	No.	Date	Tournament	Surface	Opponent	Score
Win	1.	13 June 2004	ITF Alcobaça, Portugal	Hard	(Spain) Lucía Jiménez	7–5, 5–7, 6–1
Win	2.	24 October 2004	ITF Évora, Portugal	Hard	(Germany) Laura Zelder	6–1, 2–6, ret.
Loss	1.	18 June 2006	ITF Montemor-o-Novo, Portugal	Hard	(China) Han Xinyun	2–6, 6–2, 5–7
Win	3.	25 June 2006	ITF Alcobaça, Portugal	Hard	(China) Han Xinyun	6–3, 2–6, 7–5
Win	4.	27 August 2006	ITF Vlaardingen, Netherlands	Clay	(Netherlands) Pauline Wong	6–1, 6–2
Win	5.	17 September 2006	ITF Lleida, Spain	Clay	(Spain) Paula Fondevila Castro	5–7, 6–2, 7–6^{(7–2)}
Loss	2.	25 November 2006	ITF Ramat HaSharon, İsrael	Hard	(Netherlands) Nicole Thyssen	2–6, 4–6
Win	6.	26 February 2007	ITF Portimão, Portugal	Hard	(France) Irena Pavlovic	7–6^{(7–2)}, 6–4
Loss	3.	25 March 2007	ITF Athens, Greece	Hard	(Serbia) Ana Jovanović	3–6, 6–4, 3–6
Loss	4.	25 May 2007	ITF Fuerteventura, Spain	Carpet	(Netherlands) Nicole Thyssen	2–6, 4–6
Win	7.	1 June 2007	ITF Braga, Portugal	Clay	(France) Stéphanie Vongsouthi	6–1, 6–4
Loss	5.	15 July 2007	ITF Felixstowe, Great Britain	Grass	(Czech Republic) Petra Cetkovská	2–6, 4–6
Win	8.	29 July 2007	ITF La Coruña, Spain	Hard	(New Zealand) Marina Erakovic	0–6, 7–5, 6–3
Loss	6.	11 August 2007	ITF Coimbra, Portugal	Hard	(France) Olivia Sanchez	6–7^{(8–10)}, 1–6
Win	9.	27 January 2008	ITF Kaarst, Germany	Carpet (i)	(Netherlands) Renée Reinhard	6–3, 6–1
Win	10.	13 July 2008	ITF Felixstowe, Great Britain	Grass	(United Kingdom) Sarah Borwell	6–3, 6–2
Loss	7.	26 July 2008	ITF La Coruña, Spain	Hard	(Greece) Anna Gerasimou	2–6, 7–6^{(7–5)}, 3–6
Win	11.	3 August 2008	ITF Vigo, Spain	Hard	(Spain) Sílvia Soler Espinosa	6–3, 6–1
Win	12.	11 July 2009	ITF La Coruña, Spain	Hard	(Serbia) Vesna Dolonc	6–3, 6–1
Loss	8.	21 March 2010	ITF St. Petersburg, Russia	Hard (i)	(Russia) Alexandra Panova	1–6, 5–7

=== Doubles: 28 (18 titles, 10 runner-ups) ===
Result	No.	Date	Tournament	Surface	Partner	Opponents	Score
Win	1.	23 June 2002	ITF Montemor-o-Novo, Portugal	Hard	(Portugal) Carlota Santos	(Italy) Alberta Brianti (Portugal) Frederica Piedade	6–4, 6–2
Loss	1.	14 July 2002	ITF Getxo, Spain	Clay	(Ukraine) Irena Nossenko	(Spain) Marta Fraga (Spain) María José Sánchez Alayeto	3–6, 4–6
Win	2.	4 August 2002	ITF Pontevedra, Spain	Hard	(Portugal) Frederica Piedade	(Italy) Alberta Brianti (Turkey) İpek Şenoğlu	6–2, 4–6, 6–2
Win	3.	29 September 2002	ITF Lleida, Spain	Clay	(Portugal) Frederica Piedade	(Germany) Caroline-Ann Basu (Switzerland) Aliénor Tricerri	6–7^{(5)}, 6–2, 6–4
Loss	2.	13 October 2002	ITF Catania, Italy	Clay	(Austria) Susanne Filipp	(France) Kildine Chevalier (New Zealand) Shelley Stephens	2–6, 2–6
Win	4.	25 May 2003	ITF Almería, Spain	Hard	(Turkey) İpek Şenoğlu	(Colombia) Romy Farah (Spain) Astrid Waernes	7–5, 5–7, 6–3
Win	5.	3 August 2003	ITF Pontevedra, Spain	Hard	(Spain) Gabriela Velasco Andreu	(Ukraine) Veronika Litvinskaya (Russia) Elena Poliakova	6–0, 6–1
Loss	3.	30 August 2003	ITF Coimbra, Portugal	Hard	(United Kingdom) Hannah Collin	(New Zealand) Paula Marama (Israel) Danielle Steinberg	4–6, 6–7
Loss	4.	18 October 2003	ITF Carcavelos, Portugal	Clay	(Colombia) Romy Farah	(Spain) Rosa María Andrés Rodríguez (France) Céline Beigbeder	2–6, 0–1 ret.
Win	6.	16 May 2004	ITF Monzón, Spain	Hard	(Brazil) Larissa Carvalho	(Brazil) Joana Cortez (Brazil) Marina Tavares	6–2, 6–4
Loss	5.	13 September 2004	ITF Lleida, Spain	Clay	(France) Kildine Chevalier	(Italy) Elena Vianello (Italy) Elisa Villa	5–7, 5–7
Win	7.	28 August 2005	ITF Amarante, Portugal	Hard	(Brazil) Joana Cortez	(Argentina) Flavia Mignola (Spain) Gabriela Velasco Andreu	6–2, 6–3
Win	8.	9 October 2005	ITF Bolton, Great Britain	Hard (i)	(Austria) Daniela Kix	(Czech Republic) Veronika Chvojková (United Kingdom) Claire Peterzan	6–0, 6–2
Loss	6.	17 June 2006	ITF Montemor-o-Novo	Hard	(Norway) Karoline Steiro	(Greece) Anna Koumantou (Turkey) Pemra Özgen	w/o
Loss	7.	12 August 2006	ITF Coimbra, Portugal	Hard	(Brazil) Joana Cortez	(Argentina) María José Argeri (Brazil) Letícia Sobral	6–7, 6–7
Win	9.	18 November 2006	ITF Mallorca, Spain	Clay	(Spain) Nuria Sánchez García	(Slovenia) Anja Prislan (Germany) Laura Siegemund	6–3, 6–1
Win	10.	27 January 2007	ITF Hull, Great Britain	Hard (i)	(France) Claire de Gubernatis	(United Kingdom) Danielle Brown (United Kingdom) Elizabeth Thomas	6–7^{(2)}, 7–5, 6–4
Win	11.	25 February 2007	ITF Portimão, Portugal	Hard	(Netherlands) Nicole Thyssen	(United States) Jessica Lehnhoff (United States) Robin Stephenson	6–4, 6–2
Win	12.	24 March 2007	ITF Athens, Greece	Hard	(Netherlands) Nicole Thyssen	(Greece) Anna Koumantou (Turkey) Pemra Özgen	6–2, 6–4
Win	13.	24 May 2007	ITF Fuerteventura, Spain	Carpet	(Netherlands) Nicole Thyssen	(Colombia) Mariana Duque Marino (Brazil) Roxane Vaisemberg	6–1, 6–2
Loss	8.	9 June 2007	ITF Madrid, Spain	Clay	(Russia) Nina Bratchikova	(Argentina) Jorgelina Cravero (Argentina) Betina Jozami	4–6, 4–6
Win	14.	7 July 2007	ITF Mont-de-Marsan, France	Clay	(Russia) Nina Bratchikova	(Brazil) Joana Cortez (Brazil) Teliana Pereira	6–3, 7–6^{(3)}
Win	15.	10 August 2007	ITF Coimbra, Portugal	Hard	(Hungary) Kira Nagy	(Poland) Magdalena Kiszczyńska (Belgium) Yanina Wickmayer	6–3, 3–6, 7–5
Loss	9.	2 December 2007	ITF Sintra, Portugal	Clay (i)	(Brazil) Roxane Vaisemberg	(Belgium) Caroline Maes (Serbia) Teodora Mirčić	4–6, 1–6
Loss	10.	9 February 2008	ITF Vale do Lobo, Portugal	Hard	(Netherlands) Danielle Harmsen	(Ukraine) Kateryna Herth (Russia) Nina Bratchikova	4–6, 3–6
Win	16.	5 July 2008	ITF Mont-de-Marsan, France	Clay	(Turkey) İpek Şenoğlu	(Austria) Melanie Klaffner (Portugal) Frederica Piedade	6–4, 6–2
Win	17.	25 July 2008	ITF La Coruña, Spain	Hard	(Netherlands) Nicole Thyssen	(Colombia) Karen Castiblanco (Colombia) Paula Zabala	6–2, 6–2
Win	18.	2 August 2008	ITF Vigo, Spain	Hard	(Netherlands) Nicole Thyssen	(Russia) Nina Bratchikova (Portugal) Frederica Piedade	6–2, 6–4

== Singles performance timeline ==
Key
W	F	SF	QF	#R	RR	Q#	DNQ	A	NH

(W) winner; (F) finalist; (SF) semifinalist; (QF) quarterfinalist; (#R) rounds 4, 3, 2, 1; (RR) round-robin stage; (Q#) qualification round; (DNQ) did not qualify; (A) absent; (NH) not held; (SR) strike rate (events won / competed); (W–L) win–loss record.

Tournament	2002	2003	2004	2005	2006	2007	2008	2009	2010	Career SR	Career W–L
Grand Slam tournaments
Australian Open	A	A	A	A	A	A	LQ	LQ	LQ	0 / 0	0–0
French Open	A	A	A	A	A	A	LQ	LQ	A	0 / 0	0–0
Wimbledon	A	A	A	A	A	A	LQ	1R	LQ	0 / 1	0–1
US Open	A	A	A	A	A	A	LQ	LQ	A	0 / 0	0–0
SR	0 / 0	0 / 0	0 / 0	0 / 0	0 / 0	0 / 0	0 / 0	0 / 1	0 / 0	0 / 0	N/A
Win–loss	0–0	0–0	0–0	0–0	0–0	0–0	0–0	0–1	0–0	N/A	0–1
Premier 5 tournaments
Dubai	Not Tier I							LQ	A	0 / 0	0–0
SR	0 / 0	0 / 0	0 / 0	0 / 0	0 / 0	0 / 0	0 / 0	0 / 0	0 / 0	0 / 0	N/A
Win–loss	0–0	0–0	0–0	0–0	0–0	0–0	0–0	0–0	0–0	N/A	0–0
Premier tournaments
Moscow	A	A	A	A	A	A	A	LQ	A	0 / 0	0–0
SR	0 / 0	0 / 0	0 / 0	0 / 0	0 / 0	0 / 0	0 / 0	0 / 0	0 / 0	0 / 0	N/A
Win–loss	0–0	0–0	0–0	0–0	0–0	0–0	0–0	0–0	0–0	N/A	0–0
SR	0 / 1	0 / 0	0 / 1	0 / 1	0 / 0	0 / 1	0 / 1	0 / 3	0 / 0	0 / 8	N/A
Win–loss	0–1	0–0	1–1	0–1	0–0	0–1	0–1	1–3	0–0	N/A	2–8
Career statistics
Tournaments played	1	0	1	1	0	1	1	4	0	Career total: 9	
Finals reached	0	0	0	0	0	0	0	0	0	Career total: 0	
Tournaments won	0	0	0	0	0	0	0	0	0	Career total: 0	
Statistics by surface
Hardcourt win-loss	0–0	0–0	0–0	0–0	0–0	4–0	0–0	3–1	0–0	N/A	7–1
Clay win-loss	0–2	0–0	1–1	2–1	0–0	0–1	0–1	1–2	0–0	N/A	4–8
Grass win-loss	0–0	0–0	0–0	0–0	0–0	0–0	0–0	0–1	0–0	N/A	0–1
Carpet win-loss	0–0	0–0	0–0	0–0	0–0	0–0	0–2	0–0	0–0	N/A	0–2
Overall win-loss	0–2	0–0	1–1	2–1	0–0	4–1	0–3	4–4	0–0	N/A	11–12
Win (%)	0%	0%	50%	67%	0%	80%	0%	50%	0%	Career win: 48%	
Year-end ranking	710	732	421	468	495	204	162	170	434	N/A	N/A

- Fed Cup matches are included in the statistics; walkovers are neither official wins nor official losses.

== Fed Cup ==
Silva played for the Portugal Fed Cup team from 2002 to 2009. Her singles record is 9–6 and her doubles record is 9–3 (18–9 overall).

=== Participations ===
==== Singles (15) ====
Edition	Round	Date	Against	Surface	Opponent	W–L	Result
2002 Fed Cup; Europe/Africa Group I	RR	24 April 2002	Bulgaria	Clay	(Bulgaria) Desislava Topalova	Loss	6–7^{(4–7)}, 1–6
2005 Fed Cup; Europe/Africa Group III	RR	26 April 2005	Moldova	Clay	(Moldova) Ina Sireteanu	Win	6–1, 6–1
2005 Fed Cup; Europe/Africa Group III	GIII Play-offs	28 April 2005	Bosnia and Herzegovina	Clay	(Bosnia and Herzegovina) Selma Babic	Win	6–3, 6–0
2007 Fed Cup; Europe/Africa Group II	RR	17–19 April 2007	Bosnia and Herzegovina	Hard	(Bosnia and Herzegovina) Dijana Stojić	Win	6–3, 6–3
2007 Fed Cup; Europe/Africa Group II	RR	17–19 April 2007	(Georgia (country)) Georgia	Hard	(Georgia (country)) Oksana Kalashnikova	Win	7–5, 6–4
2007 Fed Cup; Europe/Africa Group II	RR	17–19 April 2007	Norway	Hard	(Norway) Karoline Steiro	Win	6–2, 6–1
2007 Fed Cup; Europe/Africa Group II	GII Play-offs	20 April 2007	Greece	Hard	(Greece) Asimina Kaplani	Win	6–2, 6–1
2008 Fed Cup; Europe/Africa Group I	RR	30 January– 3 February 2008	Bulgaria	Carpet	(Bulgaria) Tsvetana Pironkova	Loss	1–6, 0–6
2008 Fed Cup; Europe/Africa Group I	RR	30 January– 3 February 2008	Netherlands	Carpet	(Netherlands) Arantxa Rus	Loss	5–7, 4–6
2009 Fed Cup; Europe/Africa Group II	RR	22–24 April 2009	Morocco	Hard	(Morocco) Nadia Lalami	Win	6–1, 6–0
2009 Fed Cup; Europe/Africa Group II	RR	22–24 April 2009	Latvia	Hard	(Latvia) Irina Kuzmina	Win	6–2, 6–1
2009 Fed Cup; Europe/Africa Group II	GII Play-offs	25 April 2009	South Africa	Hard	(South Africa) Lizaan du Plessis	Win	6–2, 6–3
2010 Fed Cup; Europe/Africa Group I	RR	4–5 February 2010	Croatia	Hard	(Croatia) Ajla Tomljanović	Loss	6–7^{(6–8)}, 4–6
2010 Fed Cup; Europe/Africa Group I	RR	4–5 February 2010	Switzerland	Hard	(Switzerland) Amra Sadiković	Loss	4–6, 1–6
2010 Fed Cup; Europe/Africa Group I	GI Play-offs	6 February 2010	Bulgaria	Hard	(Bulgaria) Dia Evtimova	Loss	1–6, 1–6

==== Doubles (12) ====
Edition	Round	Date	Partnering	Against	Surface	Opponents	W–L	Result
2002 Fed Cup; Europe/Africa Group I	RR	26 April 2002	(Portugal) Angela Cardoso	(Georgia (country)) Georgia	Clay	(Georgia (country)) Margalita Chakhnashvili (Georgia (country)) Salome Devidze	Loss	4–6, 3–6
2003 Fed Cup; Europe/Africa Group II	RR	29 April– 1 May 2003	(Portugal) Ana Catarina Nogueira	Norway	Clay	(Norway) Karoline Borgersen (Norway) Ina Sartz	Win	6–0, 6–2
2003 Fed Cup; Europe/Africa Group II	RR	29 April– 1 May 2003	(Portugal) Frederica Piedade	Turkey	Clay	(Turkey) Pemra Özgen (Turkey) İpek Şenoğlu	Win	6–3, 2–6, 6–2
2005 Fed Cup; Europe/Africa Group III	RR	29 April 2005	(Portugal) Ana Catarina Nogueira	Kenya	Clay	(Kenya) Caroline Oduor (Kenya) Tamara Orwa	Win	6–0, 6–0
2005 Fed Cup; Europe/Africa Group III	GIII Play-offs	30 April 2005	(Portugal) Ana Catarina Nogueira	Bosnia and Herzegovina	Clay	(Bosnia and Herzegovina) Selma Babic (Bosnia and Herzegovina) Sanja Racic	Win	6–1, 6–3
2006 Fed Cup; Europe/Africa Group II	RR	26–28 April 2006	(Portugal) Ana Catarina Nogueira	Poland	Clay	(Poland) Klaudia Jans (Poland) Alicja Rosolska	Loss	2–6, 2–6
2006 Fed Cup; Europe/Africa Group II	RR	26–28 April 2006	(Portugal) Ana Catarina Nogueira	Latvia	Clay	(Latvia) Anastasija Sevastova (Latvia) Alise Vaidere	Win	6–3, 4–6, 6–2
2006 Fed Cup; Europe/Africa Group II	RR	26–28 April 2006	(Portugal) Ana Catarina Nogueira	Greece	Clay	(Greece) Anna Gerasimou (Greece) Anna Koumantou	Win	6–2, 3–6, 6–4
2009 Fed Cup; Europe/Africa Group II	RR	22–24 April 2009	(Portugal) Frederica Piedade	Morocco	Hard	(Morocco) Fatima El Allami (Morocco) Nadia Lalami	Win	6–0, 6–1
2009 Fed Cup; Europe/Africa Group II	RR	22–24 April 2009	(Portugal) Frederica Piedade	Latvia	Hard	(Latvia) Līga Dekmeijere (Latvia) Anastasija Sevastova	Loss	1–6, 1–6
2010 Fed Cup; Europe/Africa Group I	RR	4–5 February 2010	(Portugal) Michelle Larcher de Brito	Croatia	Hard	(Croatia) Jelena Kostanić Tošić (Croatia) Silvia Njirić	Win	7–5, 6–4
2010 Fed Cup; Europe/Africa Group I	RR	4–5 February 2010	(Portugal) Maria João Koehler	Romania	Hard	(Romania) Irina-Camelia Begu (Romania) Ioana Raluca Olaru	Win	7–5, 7–5
