= Frederica Piedade =

Portuguese tennis player (born 1982)

- Country (sports): Portugal
- Residence: Buenos Aires, Argentina
- Born: 5 June 1982 (age 43) Faro, Portugal
- Turned pro: 1997
- Retired: 2014
- Prize money: $213,411

Singles
- Career record: 305–241
- Career titles: 11 ITF
- Highest ranking: No. 142 (15 May 2006)

Grand Slam singles results
- Australian Open: Q2 (2006)
- French Open: Q2 (2009)
- Wimbledon: Q3 (2005, 2006)
- US Open: Q1 (2005, 2006, 2009)

Doubles
- Career record: 190–125
- Career titles: 19 ITF
- Highest ranking: No. 158 (16 February 2009)

Frederica Piedade (born 5 June 1982) is a former Portuguese tennis player.

Her career-high WTA singles ranking is 142, which she reached on 15 May 2006; her best doubles ranking is No. 158, achieved on 16 February 2009. Piedade has competed for the Portugal Fed Cup team, having a total win–loss record of 12–4.

Though not officially retired, she hasn't played in the professional circuit since 2009. In the summer of 2014, Frederica toured the Portuguese communities on Long Island, New York as she prepared for the US Open.

== ITF Circuit finals ==
Legend
$50,000 tournaments
$25,000 tournaments
$10,000 tournaments

=== Singles: 23 (11 titles, 12 runner-ups) ===
Result	No.	Date	Tournament	Surface	Opponent	Score
Loss	1.	4 August 2002	ITF Pontevedra, Spain	Hard	(Italy) Alberta Brianti	4–6, 6–3, 0–6
Loss	2.	11 August 2002	ITF Vigo, Spain	Hard	(Italy) Alberta Brianti	2–6, 5–7
Win	1.	8 September 2002	ITF Mollerussa, Spain	Hard	(Switzerland) Aliénor Tricerri	6–4, 6–2
Loss	3.	9 March 2003	ITF Cairo, Egypt	Clay	(Netherlands) Amanda Hopmans	6–7, 4–6
Win	2.	23 March 2003	ITF Cairo, Egypt	Clay	(Slovakia) Michaela Michálková	6–2, 3–6, 6–4
Win	3.	18 May 2003	ITF Monzón, Spain	Hard	(France) Kildine Chevalier	6–4, 6–3
Win	4.	22 June 2003	ITF Montemor-o-Novo, Portugal	Hard	(United Kingdom) Chantal Coombs	6–3, 6–3
Win	5.	20 July 2003	ITF Campos do Jordão, Brazil	Hard	(Brazil) Maria Fernanda Alves	6–2, 6–1
Loss	4.	23 January 2004	ITF Manama, Bahrain	Hard	(Austria) Jennifer Schmidt	4–6, 3–6
Loss	5.	7 March 2004	ITF Melilla, Spain	Hard	(Russia) Nina Bratchikova	2–6, 4–6
Win	6.	21 March 2004	ITF Tel Aviv, Israel	Hard	(Israel) Cheli Bargil	4–6, 6–1, 6–0
Loss	6.	25 April 2004	ITF Poza Rica, Mexico	Hard	(United States) Jessica Kirkland	3–6, 2–6
Win	7.	8 August 2004	ITF Vigo, Spain	Hard	(Spain) Lucía Jiménez	6–1, 6–3
Win	8.	17 October 2004	ITF Mexico City	Hard	(Mexico) Melissa Torres Sandoval	7–5, 6–2
Loss	7.	20 March 2005	ITF Morelia, Spain	Hard	(Brazil) Jenifer Widjaja	6–1, 4–6, 5–7
Loss	8.	9 October 2005	ITF Juárez, Mexico	Clay	(Czech Republic) Olga Vymetálková	6–7, 2–6
Win	9.	28 November 2005	ITF San Luis Potosí, Mexico	Hard	(Argentina) Jorgelina Cravero	6–3, 6–1
Loss	9.	15 October 2006	ITF Saltillo, Mexico	Hard	(Argentina) Jorgelina Cravero	2–6, 2–6
Loss	10.	19 August 2007	ITF Bogotá, Colombia	Clay	(Brazil) Teliana Pereira	6–7, 2–6
Win	10.	27 April 2008	ITF Toluca, Mexico	Hard	(Netherlands) Bo Verhulsdonk	6–3, 6–3
Loss	11.	13 July 2008	ITF Valladolid, Spain	Hard	(Spain) Estrella Cabeza Candela	4–6, 6–7
Loss	12.	12 October 2008	ITF San Luis Potosí, Mexico	Hard	(Georgia (country)) Oksana Kalashnikova	5–7, 6–4, 4–6
Win	11.	11 October 2009	ITF Mexico City	Hard	(Venezuela) Marina Giral Lores	6–1, 6–2

=== Doubles: 38 (19 titles, 19 runner-ups) ===
Result	No.	Date	Tournament	Surface	Partner	Opponents	Score
Loss	1.	13 September 1998	ITF Póvoa de Varzim, Portugal	Hard	(Portugal) Ana Gaspar	(Spain) Marta Marrero (Sweden) Aleksandra Srndovic	1–6, 0–6
Loss	2.	2 July 2000	ITF Elvas, Portugal	Hard	(Portugal) Carlota Santos	(France) Diana Brunel (France) Edith Nunes	5–7, 2–6
Loss	3.	23 June 2002	ITF Montemor-o-Novo, Portugal	Hard	(Italy) Alberta Brianti	(Portugal) Carlota Santos (Portugal) Neuza Silva	4–6, 2–6
Win	4.	5 August 2002	ITF Pontevedra, Spain	Hard	(Portugal) Neuza Silva	(Italy) Alberta Brianti (Turkey) İpek Şenoğlu	6–2, 4–6, 6–2
Win	5.	22 September 2002	ITF Barcelona, Spain	Hard	(Czech Republic) Iveta Gerlová	(Spain) Marta Fraga (France) Adriana González-Peñas	6–4, 6–4
Win	6.	29 September 2002	ITF Lleida, Spain	Clay	(Portugal) Neuza Silva	(Germany) Caroline-Ann Basu (Switzerland) Aliénor Tricerri	6–7^{(5–7)}, 6–2, 6–4
Loss	7.	23 March 2003	ITF Cairo, Egypt	Clay	(Serbia and Montenegro) Borka Majstorović	(Serbia and Montenegro) Daniela Berček (Czech Republic) Vladimíra Uhlířová	w/o
Win	8.	11 May 2003	ITF Tortosa, Spain	Clay	(Turkey) İpek Şenoğlu	(Romania) Liana Ungur (Spain) María Pilar Sánchez Alayeto	6–4, 7–6
Loss	9.	14 July 2003	ITF Campos do Jordão, Brazil	Hard	(Argentina) Melisa Arévalo	(Brazil) Carla Tiene (Brazil) Maria Fernanda Alves	6–7, 2–6
Loss	10.	24 January 2004	ITF Manama, Bahrain	Hard	(Greece) Christina Zachariadou	(Russia) Raissa Gourevitch (Russia) Ekaterina Kozhokina	4–6, 4–6
Win	11.	8 February 2004	ITF Vale do Lobo, Portugal	Clay	(France) Kildine Chevalier	(Argentina) Soledad Esperón (Argentina) Flavia Mignola	2–6, 6–3, 6–4
Loss	12.	15 February 2004	ITF Albufeira, Portugal	Clay	(France) Kildine Chevalier	(Czech Republic) Zuzana Černá (Czech Republic) Vladimíra Uhlířová	7–6, 4–6, 5–7
Win	13.	21 March 2004	ITF Ramat Hasharon, Israel	Hard	(Czech Republic) Iveta Gerlová	(Spain) Julia Gandia (Spain) Gabriela Velasco Andreu	6–2, 4–6, 6–2
Win	14.	28 March 2004	ITF Elda, Spain	Clay	(Spain) Lourdes Domínguez Lino	(Czech Republic) Andrea Hlaváčková (Czech Republic) Jana Hlaváčková	w/o
Win	15.	25 April 2004	ITF Poza Rica, Mexico	Hard	(Spain) Lourdes Domínguez Lino	(Argentina) Jorgelina Cravero (Turkey) İpek Şenoğlu	7–5, 6–0
Win	16.	20 June 2004	ITF Montemor-o-Novo, Portugal	Hard	(Switzerland) Alienor Tricerri	(Jamaica) Alanna Broderick (United States) Megan Moulton-Levy	6–4, 6–3
Loss	17.	28 June 2004	ITF Mont-de-Marsan, France	Clay	(Russia) Nina Bratchikova	(Spain) Lourdes Domínguez Lino (Spain) Paula García	3–6, 6–3, 4–6
Win	18.	1 August 2004	ITF Pontevedra, Spain	Hard	(Switzerland) Alienor Tricerri	(United States) Julianna Gates (Australia) Natasha Kersten	7–5, 6–4
Loss	19.	26 September 2004	ITF Jounieh, Lebanon	Clay	(Spain) Nuria Llagostera Vives	(Czech Republic) Petra Cetkovská (Czech Republic) Hana Šromová	4–6, 2–6
Win	20.	3 July 2005	ITF Mont-de-Marsan, France	Hard	(Argentina) Natalia Gussoni	(France) Émilie Bacquet (France) Violette Huck	6–1, 7–6
Loss	21.	18 July 2005	ITF Campos do Jordão, Brazil	Hard	(Brazil) Maria Fernanda Alves	(Brazil) Letícia Sobral (Argentina) María José Argeri	0–6, 2–6
Win	22.	29 July 2006	ITF Pétange, Luxembourg	Clay	(Argentina) Erica Krauth	(Lithuania) Lina Stančiūtė (Luxembourg) Claudine Schaul	6–3, 6–3
Win	23.	6 August 2006	ITF Baden-Baden, Germany	Clay	(Australia) Jarmila Gajdošová	(Czech Republic) Libuše Průšová (Czech Republic) Barbora Záhlavová-Strýcová	7–5, 4–6, 7–6^{(8–6)}
Loss	24.	21 October 2006	ITF Victoria, Mexico	Hard	(Argentina) Jorgelina Cravero	(Brazil) Carla Tiene (Argentina) Jenifer Widjaja	7–5, 4–6, 4–6
Win	25.	14 April 2007	ITF Gran Canaria, Spain	Clay	(United Kingdom) Anne Keothavong	(Spain) Marta Marrero (Spain) Carla Suárez Navarro	w/o
Loss	26.	6 October 2007	ITF Monterrey, Mexico	Hard	(Brazil) Roxane Vaisemberg	(Argentina) Florencia Molinero (Mexico) Melissa Torres Sandoval	1–6, 5–7
Win	27.	13 January 2008	ITF St. Leo, United States	Hard	(Argentina) Soledad Esperón	(Italy) Corinna Dentoni (Russia) Anastasia Pivovarova	6–2, 6–7, [10–7]
Win	28.	26 April 2008	ITF Toluca, Mexico	Hard	(Argentina) Agustina Lepore	(United States) Lena Litvak (Canada) Rebecca Marino	6–4, 6–2
Loss	29.	30 June 2008	ITF Mont-de-Marsan, France	Clay	(Austria) Melanie Klaffner	(Turkey) İpek Şenoğlu (Portugal) Neuza Silva	4–6, 2–6
Loss	30.	3 August 2008	ITF Vigo, Spain	Hard	(Russia) Nina Bratchikova	(Portugal) Neuza Silva (Netherlands) Nicole Thijssen	2–6, 4–6
Win	31.	6 October 2008	ITF San Luis Potosí, Mexico	Hard	(Brazil) Maria Fernanda Alves	(Argentina) Soledad Esperón (Argentina) Florencia Molinero	5–7, 6–1, [10–8]
Loss	32.	18 October 2008	ITF Mexico City	Hard	(Spain) Sara del Barrio Aragón	(Argentina) Jorgelina Cravero (Argentina) Veronica Spiegel	4–6, 5–7
Loss	33.	9 November 2008	ITF Auburn, United States	Hard	(Brazil) Roxane Vaisemberg	(United States) Raquel Kops-Jones (United States) Abigail Spears	5–7, 1–6
Loss	34.	9 February 2009	ITF Cali, Colombia	Clay	(Belarus) Anastasiya Yakimova	(Argentina) Betina Jozami (Spain) Arantxa Parra Santonja	3–6, 1–6
Loss	35.	4 April 2009	ITF Pelham, United States	Clay	(Canada) Marie-Ève Pelletier	(Netherlands) Danielle Harmsen (Netherlands) Kim Kilsdonk	4–6, 7–5, [9–11]
Win	36.	13 June 2009	ITF Campobasso, Italy	Clay	(Argentina) Jorgelina Cravero	(Italy) Anna Floris (Italy) Valentina Sulpizio	6–3, 6–4
Loss	37.	22 June 2009	ITF Getxo, Spain	Clay	(Argentina) Agustina Lepore	(Russia) Anastasia Poltoratskaya (Russia) Maria Kondratieva	3–6, 1–6
Win	38.	5 October 2009	ITF Mexico City	Hard	(Bolivia) María Fernanda Álvarez Terán	(Colombia) Karen Castiblanco (Russia) Alina Jidkova	6–3, 6–4

== See also ==
- Luso Ténis Profile (in Portuguese)
