= Dijana Stojić =

Bosnian-born Croatian tennis player

- Country (sports): Croatia; Bosnia and Herzegovina
- Born: 16 July 1988 (age 37) Tuzla, SR Bosnia and Herzegovina, SFR Yugoslavia
- Height: 1.65 m (5 ft 5 in)
- Plays: Right-handed
- Prize money: $12,065

Singles
- Career record: 44–28
- Career titles: 2 ITF
- Highest ranking: No. 554 (17 July 2006)

Doubles
- Career record: 18–16
- Career titles: 1 ITF
- Highest ranking: No. 669 (17 April 2006)

Team competitions
- Fed Cup: 11-5

Dijana Stojić (born 16 July 1988) is a Bosnian-born Croatian former professional tennis player.

Stojić is originally from Tuzla in Bosnia and Herzegovina, but also grew up in the Croatian city of Makarska, having relocated there due to the war. She received her tertiary education at the University of South Carolina, where she competed on the varsity tennis team and retired ranked eighth for career SEC singles wins.

Between 2003 and 2009, Stojić represented the Bosnia and Herzegovina Fed Cup team in a total of 15 ties, winning ten of her 14 singles rubbers and one of her two doubles rubbers. During this time, she also appeared on the ITF Women's Circuit and won two singles titles, at Mostar in 2004 and Podgorica in 2005.

== ITF Circuit finals ==
=== Singles (2–3) ===
Result	No.	Date	Tournament	Surface	Opponent	Score
Win	1	2 May 2004	ITF Mostar, Bosnia and Herzegovina	Clay	(Bosnia and Herzegovina) Adriana Basarić	6–4, 6–3
Loss	1	5 September 2004	ITF Kranjska Gora, Slovenia	Clay	(Slovenia) Maša Zec Peškirič	4–6, 3–6
Win	2	2 October 2005	Royal Cup, Montenegro	Clay	(Serbia and Montenegro) Neda Kozić	4–6, 7–5, 6–3
Loss	2	16 April 2006	ITF Hvar, Croatia	Clay	(Serbia and Montenegro) Nataša Zorić	2–6, 1–6
Loss	3	23 April 2006	ITF Bol, Croatia	Clay	(Slovakia) Lenka Wienerová	2–6, 0–6

=== Doubles (1–1) ===
Result	No.	Date	Tournament	Surface	Partner	Opponents	Score
Win	1	2 October 2005	Royal Cup, Montenegro	Clay	(Croatia) Ani Mijačika	(Serbia and Montenegro) Neda Kozić (Serbia and Montenegro) Vesna Dolonc	1–6, 6–3, 6–4
Loss	1	13 May 2007	ITF Mostar, Bosnia and Herzegovina	Clay	(Croatia) Jelena Stanivuk	(Italy) Elena Pioppo (Italy) Gabriella Polito	2–6, 4–6
