= 2013 Brasil Tennis Cup – Singles =

Singles
- 2013 Brasil Tennis Cup

Final
- Champion: (Romania) Monica Niculescu
- Runner-up: (Russia) Olga Puchkova
- Score: 6–2, 4–6, 6–4

Details
- Draw: 32
- Seeds: 8

Events
Singles	Doubles
- Brasil Tennis Cup

This was the first edition of the tournament since 2002. Venus Williams was the top seed, but lost in the semifinals to Olga Puchkova.
Monica Niculescu won the title, defeating Puchkova in three sets, 6–2, 4–6, 6–4. It was her first WTA Tour singles title.

== Seeds ==
1. (United States) Venus Williams (semifinals)
2. (Kazakhstan) Yaroslava Shvedova (first round)
3. (Belgium) Kirsten Flipkens (first round)
4. (South Africa) Chanelle Scheepers (second round)
5. (Slovakia) Magdaléna Rybáriková (quarterfinals)
6. (Spain) Anabel Medina Garrigues (first round)
7. (France) Kristina Mladenovic (semifinals)
8. (Germany) Annika Beck (second round)

== Draw ==
=== Finals ===
Semifinals
1	(United States) Venus Williams	6	4	5
(Russia) Olga Puchkova	4	6	7
(Romania) Monica Niculescu	6	6
7	(France) Kristina Mladenovic	0	2

Final
(Russia) Olga Puchkova	2	6	4
(Romania) Monica Niculescu	6	4	6

=== Top half ===
First round
1	(United States) V Williams	6	6
(Croatia) M Lučić-Baroni	3	3
(Spain) G Muguruza	6	6
Q	(Germany) K Barrois	2	2
Q	(Spain) B García Vidagany	6	6
(Russia) N Bratchikova	4	2
(Japan) K Date-Krumm	3	0
5	(Slovakia) M Rybáriková	6	6
3	(Belgium) K Flipkens	6	4	4
(Russia) O Puchkova	2	6	6
(France) C Garcia	6	6
Q	(Argentina) M Irigoyen	1	4
WC	(Brazil) PC Gonçalves	6^{4}	2
(Slovakia) J Čepelová	7^{7}	6
WC	(Brazil) MF Alves	2	6	0
8	(Germany) A Beck	6	3	6

Second round
1	(United States) V Williams	6	2	7
(Spain) G Muguruza	4	6	5
Q	(Spain) B García Vidagany	4	6	4
5	(Slovakia) M Rybáriková	6	3	6
(Russia) O Puchkova	3	6	6
(France) C Garcia	6	3	3
(Slovakia) J Čepelová	7^{8}	6
8	(Germany) A Beck	6^{6}	4

Quarterfinals
1	(United States) V Williams	6	6
5	(Slovakia) M Rybáriková	4	0
(Russia) O Puchkova	6	6
(Slovakia) J Čepelová	1	1

Semifinals
1	(United States) V Williams	6	4	5
(Russia) O Puchkova	4	6	7

=== Bottom half ===
First round
6	(Spain) A Medina Garrigues	7	6^{7}	1
(Romania) M Niculescu	5	7^{9}	6
(Israel) S Pe'er	0	3
Q	(Croatia) T Mrdeža	6	6
(Russia) V Savinykh	6^{5}	7^{7}	2
(Hungary) T Babos	7^{7}	6^{3}	6
Q	(Venezuela) A Pérez	6	4	0
4	(South Africa) C Scheepers	2	6	6
7	(France) K Mladenovic	6	6
(United Kingdom) A Keothavong	3	4
(Germany) T Malek	6	6
(Brazil) T Pereira	4	2
Q	(United States) C-Y Hsu	1	2
WC	(Brazil) B Haddad Maia	6	6
(Hungary) M Czink	2	6	6
2	(Kazakhstan) Y Shvedova	6	4	2

Second round
(Romania) M Niculescu	6	6
Q	(Croatia) T Mrdeža	1	1
(Hungary) T Babos	6	6
4	(South Africa) C Scheepers	1	2
7	(France) K Mladenovic	6	6
(Germany) T Malek	2	1
WC	(Brazil) B Haddad Maia	6	2	6^{3}
(Hungary) M Czink	1	6	7^{7}

Quarterfinals
(Romania) M Niculescu	6	6
(Hungary) T Babos	3	2
7	(France) K Mladenovic	6	6
(Hungary) M Czink	4	3

Semifinals
(Romania) M Niculescu	6	6
7	(France) K Mladenovic	0	2

== Qualifying ==
=== Seeds ===
The top three seeds received a bye into the qualifying competition.

1. (Croatia) Petra Martić (qualifying competition)
2. (Israel) Julia Glushko (qualifying competition)
3. (Croatia) Tereza Mrdeža (qualified)
4. (Paraguay) Verónica Cepede Royg (first round)
5. (Argentina) María Irigoyen (qualified)
6. (Poland) Paula Kania (qualifying competition)
7. (Argentina) Florencia Molinero (qualifying competition)
8. (Venezuela) Adriana Pérez (qualified)
9. (Slovakia) Michaela Hončová (first round)
10. (Germany) Kristina Barrois (qualified)
11. (Spain) Beatriz García Vidagany (qualified)
12. (United States) Hsu Chieh-yu (qualified)

=== Qualifiers ===
1. (Spain) Beatriz García Vidagany
2. (United States) Hsu Chieh-yu
3. (Croatia) Tereza Mrdeža
4. (Germany) Kristina Barrois
5. (Argentina) María Irigoyen
6. (Venezuela) Adriana Pérez

=== Draw ===
==== First qualifier ====
First round				Qualifying competition
				1	(Croatia) Petra Martić	3	4
WC	(Brazil) Fernanda Hermenegildo	1	2	11	(Spain) Beatriz García Vidagany	6	6
11	(Spain) Beatriz García Vidagany	6	6

==== Second qualifier ====
First round				Qualifying competition
				2	(Israel) Julia Glushko	6	1	3
WC	(Brazil) Samantha Czarniak Rego	0	2	12	(United States) Hsu Chieh-yu	4	6	6
12	(United States) Hsu Chieh-yu	6	6

==== Third qualifier ====
First round				Qualifying competition
				3	(Croatia) Tereza Mrdeža	1	6	6
	(Brazil) Laura Pigossi	1	2	7	(Argentina) Florencia Molinero	6	0	4
7	(Argentina) Florencia Molinero	6	6

==== Fourth qualifier ====
First round
4	(Paraguay) Verónica Cepede Royg	4	3
(Georgia (country)) Oksana Kalashnikova	6	6
WC	(Brazil) Carla Forte	7^{7}	2	1
10	(Germany) Kristina Barrois	6^{1}	6	6

Qualifying competition
(Georgia (country)) Oksana Kalashnikova	3	2
10	(Germany) Kristina Barrois	6	6

=== Fifth qualifier ===
First round
5	(Argentina) María Irigoyen	2	6	6
(Brazil) Roxane Vaisemberg	6	0	1
(Venezuela) Andrea Gámiz	6	6
9	(Slovakia) Michaela Hončová	4	4

Qualifying competition
5	(Argentina) María Irigoyen	6	6
(Venezuela) Andrea Gámiz	4	4

=== Sixth qualifier ===
First round
6	(Poland) Paula Kania	4	7	6
(Argentina) Mailen Auroux	6	5	4
WC	(Brazil) Ingrid Gamarra Martins	0	2
8	(Venezuela) Adriana Pérez	6	6

Qualifying competition
6	(Poland) Paula Kania	2	3
8	(Venezuela) Adriana Pérez	6	6
