= 2013 Brasil Tennis Cup – Doubles =

Doubles
- 2013 Brasil Tennis Cup

Final
- Champions: (Spain) Anabel Medina Garrigues (Kazakhstan) Yaroslava Shvedova
- Runners-up: (United Kingdom) Anne Keothavong (Russia) Valeria Savinykh
- Score: 6–0, 6–4

Details
- Draw: 16
- Seeds: 4

Events
Singles	Doubles
- Brasil Tennis Cup

2013 Brasil Tennis Cup - Doubles was the first edition of a new event on the WTA Tour. Anabel Medina Garrigues and Yaroslava Shvedova won the title, defeating Anne Keothavong and Valeria Savinykh in the final, 6–0, 6–4.

== Seeds ==
1. (Spain) Anabel Medina Garrigues / (Kazakhstan) Yaroslava Shvedova (champions)
2. (Croatia) Petra Martić / (France) Kristina Mladenovic (first round)
3. (Hungary) Tímea Babos / (Japan) Kimiko Date-Krumm (semifinals)
4. (Russia) Nina Bratchikova / (Georgia (country)) Oksana Kalashnikova (first round)

== Draw ==
Key

- Q = Qualifier
- WC = Wild card
- LL = Lucky loser
- Alt = Alternate
- ITF = ITF entry
- PR = Protected ranking
- SR = Special ranking
- SE = Special exempt
- JE = Junior exempt
- JR = Junior Accelerator Programme entrant
- CO = College Accelerator Programme entrant
- NG = Next Gen Accelerator Program entrant
- w/o = Walkover
- r = Retired
- d = Defaulted

=== Draw ===
First round
1	(Spain) A Medina Garrigues (Kazakhstan) Y Shvedova	6	7
(France) C Garcia (Spain) G Muguruza	3	5
(Brazil) PC Gonçalves (Brazil) L Pigossi	4	4
(Argentina) F Molinero (Venezuela) A Pérez	6	6
3	(Hungary) T Babos (Japan) K Date-Krumm	6	6
(Israel) J Glushko (Poland) P Kania	4	2
(Israel) S Pe'er (South Africa) C Scheepers	6	6
(Slovakia) M Hončová (United States) C-y Hsu	2	3
(Hungary) M Czink (Romania) M Niculescu	5	4
(Brazil) MF Alves (Croatia) M Lučić-Baroni	7	6
(United Kingdom) A Keothavong (Russia) V Savinykh	6	2	[10]
4	(Russia) N Bratchikova (Georgia (country)) O Kalashnikova	4	6	[7]
WC	(Brazil) C Forte (Brazil) B Haddad Maia	6	7
(Argentina) M Auroux (Argentina) M Irigoyen	2	5
(Germany) K Barrois (Germany) T Malek	6	7
2	(Croatia) P Martić (France) K Mladenovic	3	5

Quarterfinals
1	(Spain) A Medina Garrigues (Kazakhstan) Y Shvedova	6	6
(Argentina) F Molinero (Venezuela) A Pérez	1	1
3	(Hungary) T Babos (Japan) K Date-Krumm	6	6
(Israel) S Pe'er (South Africa) C Scheepers	2	2
(Brazil) MF Alves (Croatia) M Lučić-Baroni	2	6	[9]
(United Kingdom) A Keothavong (Russia) V Savinykh	6	1	[11]
WC	(Brazil) C Forte (Brazil) B Haddad Maia	3	2
(Germany) K Barrois (Germany) T Malek	6	6

Semifinals
1	(Spain) A Medina Garrigues (Kazakhstan) Y Shvedova	6	4	[10]
3	(Hungary) T Babos (Japan) K Date-Krumm	3	6	[5]
(United Kingdom) A Keothavong (Russia) V Savinykh	6	1	[10]
(Germany) K Barrois (Germany) T Malek	4	6	[6]

Final
1	(Spain) A Medina Garrigues (Kazakhstan) Y Shvedova	6	6
(United Kingdom) A Keothavong (Russia) V Savinykh	0	4
