= 2013 Brasil Tennis Cup =

- Date: February 25 – March 3
- Edition: 1st
- Category: WTA International
- Draw: 32S / 16D
- Prize money: $235,000
- Surface: Hard
- Location: Florianópolis, Brazil

Champions

Singles
- (Romania) Monica Niculescu

Doubles
- (Spain) Anabel Medina Garrigues / (Kazakhstan) Yaroslava Shvedova
- Brasil Tennis Cup

The 2013 Brasil Tennis Cup is a women's tennis tournament played on outdoor hard courts. It was the 1st edition of the Brasil Tennis Cup since 2002, and is on the International category of the 2013 WTA Tour. It took place in Florianópolis, Brazil, from February 24 through March 3, 2013. Unseeded Monica Niculescu won the singles title.

== Finals ==
=== Singles ===
- (Romania) Monica Niculescu defeated (Russia) Olga Puchkova, 6–2, 4–6, 6–4

=== Doubles ===
- (Spain) Anabel Medina Garrigues / (Kazakhstan) Yaroslava Shvedova defeated (United Kingdom) Anne Keothavong / (Russia) Valeria Savinykh, 6–0, 6–4

== Singles main-draw entrants ==
=== Seeds ===
Country	Player	Rank^{1}	Seed
USA	Venus Williams	21	1
KAZ	Yaroslava Shvedova	32	2
BEL	Kirsten Flipkens	34	3
RSA	Chanelle Scheepers	58	4
SVK	Magdaléna Rybáriková	59	5
ESP	Anabel Medina Garrigues	61	6
FRA	Kristina Mladenovic	63	7
GER	Annika Beck	65	8

- Rankings are as of February 18, 2013.

=== Other entrants ===
The following players received wildcards into the singles main draw:

- (Brazil) Maria Fernanda Alves
- (Brazil) Paula Cristina Gonçalves
- (Brazil) Beatriz Haddad Maia

The following players received entry from the qualifying draw:

- (Germany) Kristina Barrois
- (Spain) Beatriz García Vidagany
- (United States) Hsu Chieh-yu
- (Argentina) María Irigoyen
- (Croatia) Tereza Mrdeža
- (Venezuela) Adriana Pérez

=== Withdrawals ===
Before the tournament

- (Czech Republic) Petra Cetkovská
- (Italy) Camila Giorgi (shoulder injury)
- (United Kingdom) Laura Robson
- (Switzerland) Stefanie Vögele
- (Kazakhstan) Galina Voskoboeva

== Doubles main-draw entrants ==
=== Seeds ===
Country	Player	Country	Player	Rank^{1}	Seed
ESP	Anabel Medina Garrigues	KAZ	Yaroslava Shvedova	50	1
CRO	Petra Martić	FRA	Kristina Mladenovic	124	2
HUN	Tímea Babos	JPN	Kimiko Date-Krumm	149	3
RUS	Nina Bratchikova	GEO	Oksana Kalashnikova	162	4

- Rankings are as of February 18, 2013.

=== Other entrants ===
The following pair received a wildcard into the doubles main draw:

- (Brazil) Carla Forte / (Brazil) Beatriz Haddad Maia
