= 2015 Brasil Tennis Cup – Doubles =

Doubles
- 2015 Brasil Tennis Cup

Final
- Champions: (Germany) Annika Beck (Germany) Laura Siegemund
- Runners-up: (Argentina) María Irigoyen (Poland) Paula Kania
- Score: 6–3, 7–6^{(7–1)}

Events
Singles	Doubles
← 2014 ·	Brasil Tennis Cup	· 2016 →

Anabel Medina Garrigues and Yaroslava Shvedova were the two-time defending champions, but chose not to participate this year.
Annika Beck and Laura Siegemund won the title, defeating María Irigoyen and Paula Kania in the final, 6–3, 7–6^{(7–1)}.

== Seeds ==
1. (Luxembourg) Mandy Minella / (Spain) María Teresa Torró Flor (semifinals)
2. (Argentina) María Irigoyen / (Poland) Paula Kania (final)
3. (Romania) Elena Bogdan / (United States) Nicole Melichar (first round)
4. (Germany) Annika Beck / (Germany) Laura Siegemund (champions)

== Draw ==
=== Key ===
- Q = Qualifier
- WC = Wild card
- LL = Lucky loser
- Alt = Alternate
- SE = Special exempt
- PR = Protected ranking
- ITF = ITF entry
- JE = Junior exempt
- w/o = Walkover
- r = Retired
- d = Defaulted
- SR = Special ranking

First round
1	(Luxembourg) M Minella (Spain) MT Torró Flor	6	6
WC	(Brazil) C Alves (Brazil) L Stefani	4	2
(Sweden) S Celik (Netherlands) Q Lemoine	0	6	[3]
(Brazil) G Cé (Venezuela) A Gámiz	6	3	[10]
4	(Germany) A Beck (Germany) L Siegemund	6	6
(Romania) A Bogdan (Czech Republic) T Martincová	1	1
(Argentina) P Ormaechea (Russia) A Pivovarova	3	1
(France) A Lim (Latvia) A Sevastova	6	6
(Russia) M Melnikova (Spain) L Pous Tió	6	6
(Paraguay) V Cepede Royg (Sweden) R Peterson	2	3
(Brazil) MF Alves (Brazil) L Pigossi	6	6
3	(Romania) E Bogdan (United States) N Melichar	4	3
(Netherlands) C Burger (Bulgaria) E Kostova	6	6
(United States) L Chirico (Brazil) PC Gonçalves	1	2
WC	(Brazil) E Drozd Pereira (Brazil) I Gamarra Martins	3	2
2	(Argentina) M Irigoyen (Poland) P Kania	6	6

Quarterfinals
1	(Luxembourg) M Minella (Spain) MT Torró Flor	6	6
(Brazil) G Cé (Venezuela) A Gámiz	2	3
4	(Germany) A Beck (Germany) L Siegemund	6	6
(France) A Lim (Latvia) A Sevastova	4	1
(Russia) M Melnikova (Spain) L Pous Tió	6	6
(Brazil) MF Alves (Brazil) L Pigossi	4	4
(Netherlands) C Burger (Bulgaria) E Kostova
2	(Argentina) M Irigoyen (Poland) P Kania	w/o

Semifinals
1	(Luxembourg) M Minella (Spain) MT Torró Flor	2	4
4	(Germany) A Beck (Germany) L Siegemund	6	6
(Russia) M Melnikova (Spain) L Pous Tió	4	2
2	(Argentina) M Irigoyen (Poland) P Kania	6	6

Final
4	(Germany) A Beck (Germany) L Siegemund	6	7^{7}
2	(Argentina) M Irigoyen (Poland) P Kania	3	6^{1}
