= 2015 Brasil Tennis Cup =

- Date: July 27 – August 1
- Edition: 3rd
- Category: WTA International
- Draw: 32S / 16D
- Prize money: $250,000
- Surface: Clay
- Location: Florianópolis, Brazil
- Venue: Costão do Santinho

Champions

Singles
- (Brazil) Teliana Pereira

Doubles
- (Germany) Annika Beck / (Germany) Laura Siegemund
- Brasil Tennis Cup

The 2015 Brasil Tennis Cup was a women's tennis tournament played on outdoor clay courts. It was the 3rd edition of the Brasil Tennis Cup, in the International category of the 2015 WTA Tour. It took place in Florianópolis, Brazil, from July 27 through August 1, 2015.

== Points and prize money ==
=== Point distribution ===
Event	W	F	SF	QF	Round of 16	Round of 32	Q	Q2	Q1
Singles	280	180	110	60	30	1	18	12	1
Doubles	280	180	110	60	1	—N/a	—N/a	—N/a	—N/a

=== Prize money ===
Event	W	F	SF	QF	Round of 16	Round of 32	Q2	Q1
Singles	$43,000	$21,400	$11,500	$6,175	$3,400	$2,100	$1,020	$600
Doubles	$12,300	$6,400	$3,435	$1,820	$960	—N/a	—N/a	—N/a

== Singles main draw entrants ==
=== Seeds ===
Country	Player	Rank^{1}	Seed
GER	Tatjana Maria	64	1
CRO	Ajla Tomljanović	69	2
GER	Annika Beck	77	3
BRA	Teliana Pereira	80	4
USA	Bethanie Mattek-Sands	115	5
USA	Louisa Chirico	128	6
GER	Laura Siegemund	130	7
POL	Paula Kania	136	8

- Rankings are as of July 20, 2015.

=== Other entrants ===
The following players received wildcards into the singles main draw:

- (Brazil) Carolina Alves
- (Brazil) Maria Fernanda Alves
- (Brazil) Luisa Stefani

The following players received entry from the qualifying draw:

- (Netherlands) Cindy Burger
- (Sweden) Susanne Celik
- (Venezuela) Andrea Gámiz
- (Netherlands) Quirine Lemoine
- (Russia) Anastasia Pivovarova
- (Spain) Laura Pous Tió

=== Withdrawals ===
Before the tournament

- (Brazil) Beatriz Haddad Maia → replaced by (Latvia) Anastasija Sevastova
- (Sweden) Johanna Larsson → replaced by (Argentina) Paula Ormaechea
- (Kazakhstan) Yulia Putintseva → replaced by (Czech Republic) Tereza Martincová
- (Spain) Sara Sorribes Tormo → replaced by (Brazil) Gabriela Cé

== Doubles main draw entrants ==
=== Seeds ===
Country	Player	Country	Player	Rank^{1}	Seed
LUX	Mandy Minella	ESP	María Teresa Torró Flor	153	1
ARG	María Irigoyen	POL	Paula Kania	176	2
ROU	Elena Bogdan	USA	Nicole Melichar	198	3
GER	Annika Beck	GER	Laura Siegemund	230	4

- Rankings are as of July 20, 2015.

=== Other entrants ===
The following pairs received wildcards into the doubles main draw:

- (Brazil) Erika Drozd Pereira / (Brazil) Ingrid Gamarra Martins
- (Brazil) Carolina Alves / (Brazil) Luisa Stefani

=== Withdrawals ===
During the tournament

- (Netherlands) Cindy Burger (right elbow injury)

== Champions ==
=== Singles ===
- (Brazil) Teliana Pereira def. (Germany) Annika Beck, 6–4, 4–6, 6–1

=== Doubles ===
- (Germany) Annika Beck / (Germany) Laura Siegemund def. (Argentina) María Irigoyen / (Poland) Paula Kania, 6–3, 7–6^{(7–1)}
