= 2015 Brasil Tennis Cup – Singles =

Singles
- 2015 Brasil Tennis Cup

Final
- Champion: (Brazil) Teliana Pereira
- Runner-up: (Germany) Annika Beck
- Score: 6–4, 4–6, 6–1

Events
Singles	Doubles
- Brasil Tennis Cup

Klára Koukalová was the defending champion, but chose not to participate this year.

Teliana Pereira won the title, defeating Annika Beck in the final, 6–4, 4–6, 6–1.

== Seeds ==
1. (Germany) Tatjana Maria (second round)
2. (Croatia) Ajla Tomljanović (second round)
3. (Germany) Annika Beck (final)
4. (Brazil) Teliana Pereira (champion)
5. (United States) Bethanie Mattek-Sands (semifinals)
6. (United States) Louisa Chirico (first round)
7. (Germany) Laura Siegemund (quarterfinals)
8. (Poland) Paula Kania (second round)

== Draw ==
Key

- Q = Qualifier
- WC = Wild card
- LL = Lucky loser
- Alt = Alternate
- ITF = ITF entry
- PR = Protected ranking
- SR = Special ranking
- SE = Special exempt
- JE = Junior exempt
- JR = Junior Accelerator Programme entrant
- CO = College Accelerator Programme entrant
- NG = Next Gen Accelerator Program entrant
- w/o = Walkover
- r = Retired
- d = Defaulted

=== Finals ===
Semifinals
(Latvia) Anastasija Sevastova	3	5
4	(Brazil) Teliana Pereira	6	7
3	(Germany) Annika Beck	7^{10}	4	6
5	(United States) Bethanie Mattek-Sands	6^{8}	6	3

Final
4	(Brazil) Teliana Pereira	6	4	6
3	(Germany) Annika Beck	4	6	1

=== Top half ===
First round
1	(Germany) T Maria	6	6
WC	(Brazil) MF Alves	2	3
(Sweden) R Peterson	3	5
(Spain) MT Torró Flor	6	7
(Paraguay) V Cepede Royg	6	6
(Brazil) PC Gonçalves	0	3
(Latvia) A Sevastova	6	6
6	(United States) L Chirico	1	4
4	(Brazil) T Pereira	6^{3}	6	7
(Argentina) M Irigoyen	7^{7}	3	5
(Japan) R Ozaki	6^{8}	6	6
Q	(Venezuela) A Gámiz	7^{10}	4	3
Q	(Russia) A Pivovarova	4	6	1
(Bulgaria) E Kostova	6	4	6
(Russia) M Melnikova	2	1
7	(Germany) L Siegemund	6	6

Second round
1	(Germany) T Maria	3	1
(Spain) MT Torró Flor	6	6
(Paraguay) V Cepede Royg	6^{4}	6	4
(Latvia) A Sevastova	7^{7}	4	6
4	(Brazil) T Pereira	6	6
(Japan) R Ozaki	4	1
(Bulgaria) E Kostova	3	1
7	(Germany) L Siegemund	6	6

Quarterfinals
(Spain) MT Torró Flor	6^{4}	4
(Latvia) A Sevastova	7^{7}	6
4	(Brazil) T Pereira	6	7
7	(Germany) L Siegemund	3	5

Semifinals
(Latvia) A Sevastova	3	5
4	(Brazil) T Pereira	6	7

=== Bottom half ===
First round
8	(Poland) P Kania	6	6
Q	(Sweden) S Celik	4	1
Q	(Netherlands) C Burger	6	6^{6}	2
(Brazil) G Cé	4	7^{8}	6
(Argentina) P Ormaechea	4	7^{8}	6^{2}
(France) A Lim	6	6^{6}	7^{7}
WC	(Brazil) C Alves	1	2
3	(Germany) A Beck	6	6
5	(United States) B Mattek-Sands	5	6	6
(Luxembourg) M Minella	7	3	4
(Romania) A Bogdan	6	6
WC	(Brazil) L Stefani	3	2
Q	(Netherlands) Q Lemoine	5	5
(Czech Republic) T Martincová	7	7
Q	(Spain) L Pous Tió	5	6^{6}
2	(Croatia) A Tomljanović	7	7^{8}

Second round
8	(Poland) P Kania	2	6^{7}
(Brazil) G Cé	6	7^{9}
(France) A Lim	1	2
3	(Germany) A Beck	6	6
5	(United States) B Mattek-Sands	6	6
(Romania) A Bogdan	2	3
(Czech Republic) T Martincová	6	4	6
2	(Croatia) A Tomljanović	1	6	1

Quarterfinals
(Brazil) G Cé	3	3
3	(Germany) A Beck	6	6
5	(United States) B Mattek-Sands	7^{7}	4	6
(Czech Republic) T Martincová	6^{2}	6	1

Semifinals
3	(Germany) A Beck	7^{10}	4	6
5	(United States) B Mattek-Sands	6^{8}	6	3

== Qualifying ==
=== Seeds ===
1. (Spain) Laura Pous Tió (qualified)
2. (Netherlands) Cindy Burger (qualified)
3. (Russia) Anastasia Pivovarova (qualified)
4. (Netherlands) Quirine Lemoine (qualified)
5. (Sweden) Susanne Celik (qualified)
6. (Venezuela) Andrea Gámiz (qualified)
7. (Romania) Elena Bogdan (qualifying competition)
8. (Italy) Gaia Sanesi (qualifying competition)
9. (Brazil) Laura Pigossi (qualifying competition)
10. (United States) Nicole Melichar (qualifying competition)
11. (Brazil) Ingrid Gamarra Martins (qualifying competition)
12. (Brazil) Amanda Andrade Silva (first round)

=== Qualifiers ===
1. (Spain) Laura Pous Tió
2. (Netherlands) Cindy Burger
3. (Russia) Anastasia Pivovarova
4. (Netherlands) Quirine Lemoine
5. (Sweden) Susanne Celik
6. (Venezuela) Andrea Gámiz

=== Draw ===
==== First qualifier ====
First round					Qualifying competition
					1	(Spain) Laura Pous Tió	6	6
WC	(Spain) Blanca Puig Caballero	3	6	6	WC	(Spain) Blanca Puig Caballero	0	2
12/WC	(Brazil) Amanda Andrade Silva	6	2	1

==== Second qualifier ====
Qualifying competition
2	(Netherlands) Cindy Burger	6	7
7	(Romania) Elena Bogdan	1	5

==== Third qualifier ====
Qualifying competition
3	(Russia) Anastasia Pivovarova	6	2	7^{7}
9	(Brazil) Laura Pigossi	2	6	6^{4}

==== Fourth qualifier ====
Qualifying competition
4	(Netherlands) Quirine Lemoine	6	6
8	(Italy) Gaia Sanesi	1	2

==== Fifth qualifier ====
Qualifying competition
5	(Sweden) Susanne Celik	6	7^{7}
10	(United States) Nicole Melichar	4	6^{3}

==== Sixth qualifier ====
First round				Qualifying competition
				6	(Venezuela) Andrea Gámiz	6	1	6
WC	(Brazil) Erika Drozd Pereira	2	0	11/WC	(Brazil) Ingrid Gamarra Martins	4	6	3
11/WC	(Brazil) Ingrid Gamarra Martins	6	6

== Bibliography ==
- Main draw
- Qualifying draw
