= Carla Forte =

Brazilian tennis player

- Full name: Carla Dragone Forte
- Country (sports): Brazil
- Born: 11 January 1994 (age 31); São Paulo
- Plays: Right (two-handed backhand)
- Prize money: $30,871

Singles
- Career record: 89–79
- Career titles: 1 ITF
- Highest ranking: No. 421 (20 August 2012)

Doubles
- Career record: 87–50
- Career titles: 11 ITF
- Highest ranking: No. 303 (28 October 2013)

Carla Dragone Forte (born 11 January 1994) is a Brazilian former professional tennis player.

Forte has career-high WTA rankings of 421 in singles, achieved in August 2012, and 303 in doubles, reached in October 2013. She won one singles title and eleven doubles titles on the ITF Women's Circuit.

Forte made her WTA Tour main-draw debut at the 2013 Brasil Tennis Cup in the doubles event, partnering Beatriz Haddad Maia. The pair reached the quarterfinals, losing to Kristina Barrois and Tatjana Malek.

== ITF Circuit finals ==
Legend
$25,000 tournaments
$10,000 tournaments

=== Singles: 3 (1 title, 2 runner-ups) ===
Result	W–L	Date	Tournament	Tier	Surface	Opponent	Score
Loss	0–1	Jun 2011	ITF Santos, Brazil	10,000	Clay	(Argentina) Andrea Benítez	0–6, 1–6
Win	1–1	May 2013	ITF Antalya, Turkey	10,000	Hard	(United States) Caitlin Whoriskey	7–6^{(7–3)}, 7–5
Loss	1–2	Sep 2013	ITF Antalya	10,000	Hard	(Ukraine) Vladyslava Zanosiyenko	5–7, 2–6

=== Doubles: 18 (11 titles, 7 runner-ups) ===
Outcome	No.	Date	Tournament	Surface	Partner	Opponents	Score
Winner	1.	27 September 2008	ITF Serra Negra, Brazil	Clay	(Brazil) Carla Tiene	(Brazil) Ana Clara Duarte (Brazil) Fernanda Hermenegildo	6–4, 2–6, [10–8]
Runner-up	2.	25 October 2010	ITF Itu, Brazil	Clay	(Brazil) Flávia Dechandt Araújo	(Brazil) Gabriela Cé (Brazil) Vivian Segnini	0–6, 4–6
Winner	3.	25 April 2011	ITF São Paulo, Brazil	Clay	(Brazil) Gabriela Cé	(Brazil) Isabela Miró (Brazil) Nathália Rossi	7–6^{(7–5)}, 6–4
Winner	4.	27 June 2011	ITF São José dos Campos, Brazil	Clay	(Brazil) Maria Fernanda Alves	(Brazil) Monique Albuquerque (Brazil) Fernanda Faria	6–4, 0–6, 6–4
Winner	5.	1 August 2011	ITF São Paulo, Brazil	Clay	(Brazil) Beatriz Haddad Maia	(Paraguay) Isabella Robbiani (India) Kyra Shroff	6–7^{(5–7)}, 6–3, [10–7]
Runner-up	6.	21 November 2011	ITF Rancagua, Chile	Clay	(Brazil) Flávia Guimarães Bueno	(Chile) Belén Ludueña (Chile) Daniela Seguel	4–6, 6–4, [5–10]
Winner	7.	26 March 2012	ITF Ribeirão Preto, Brazil	Clay	(Brazil) Gabriela Cé	(Paraguay) Isabella Robbiani (Argentina) Carolina Zeballos	6–1, 3–6, [10–7]
Runner-up	8.	2 April 2012	ITF Ribeirão Preto	Hard	(Brazil) Gabriela Cé	(Chile) Fernanda Brito (Brazil) Raquel Piltcher	3–6, 7–5, [7–10]
Runner-up	9.	23 April 2012	ITF São Paulo	Clay	(Brazil) Gabriela Cé	(Brazil) Ana Clara Duarte (Venezuela) Gabriela Paz	7–5, 3–6, [5–10]
Runner-up	10.	30 April 2012	ITF São José dos Campos, Brazil	Clay	(Brazil) Laura Pigossi	(Bolivia) María Fernanda Álvarez Terán (Venezuela) Gabriela Paz	0–6, 3–6
Winner	11.	25 March 2013	ITF Ribeirão Preto, Brazil	Clay	(Argentina) Andrea Benítez	(Brazil) Eduarda Piai (Brazil) Karina Venditti	7–6^{(7–2)}, 6–1
Winner	12.	15 April 2013	ITF Antalya, Turkey	Hard	(Argentina) Andrea Benítez	(Romania) Irina Bara (Romania) Diana Buzean	6–2, 6–4
Winner	13.	22 April 2013	ITF Antalya	Hard	(Argentina) Andrea Benítez	(Belgium) Catherine Chantraine (Russia) Angelina Gabueva	6–1, 6–4
Winner	14.	29 April 2013	ITF Antalya	Hard	(Argentina) Andrea Benítez	(United States) Rosalia Alda (United States) Caitlin Whoriskey	4–6, 7–5, [10–4]
Runner-up	15.	6 May 2013	ITF Antalya	Hard	(Argentina) Andrea Benítez	(Russia) Shakhlo Saidova (Ukraine) Anna Shkudun	6–4, 2–6, [8–10]
Runner-up	16.	20 May 2013	ITF Antalya	Hard	(Argentina) Andrea Benítez	(China) Gai Ao (Turkey) Sultan Gönen	6–3, 5–7, [6–10]
Winner	17.	3 June 2013	ITF Santos, Brazil	Clay	(Argentina) Andrea Benítez	(Brazil) Ana Clara Duarte (Brazil) Nathaly Kurata	6–4, 6–1
Winner	18.	26 August 2013	ITF Antalya	Clay	(Argentina) Andrea Benítez	(Finland) Emma Laine (United Kingdom) Melanie South	4–6, 6–3, [10–8]
