= Yaroslava Shvedova =

Kazakhstani tennis player (born 1987)

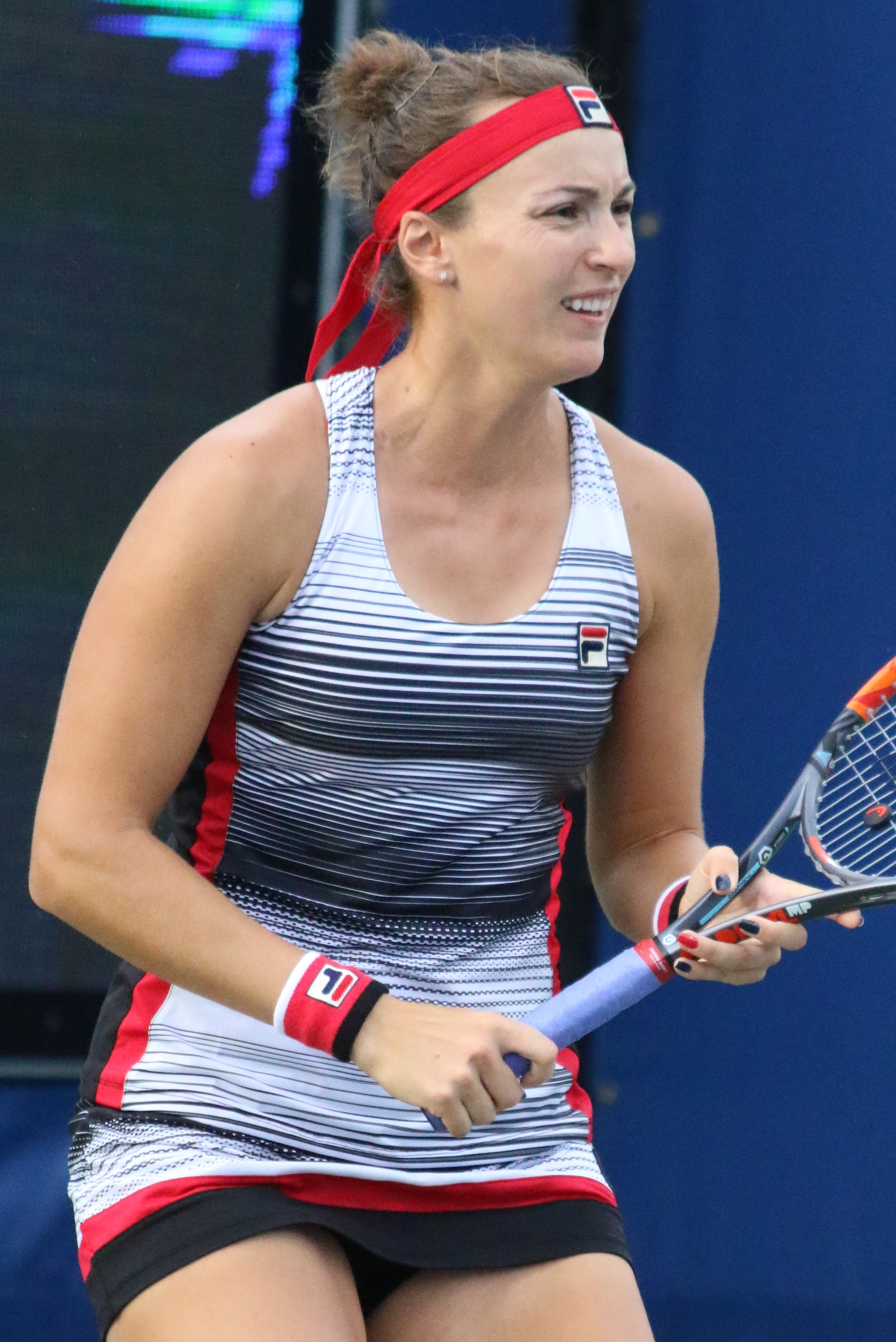
- Shvedova at the 2016 US Open
- Country (sports): Russia (2002–2008); Kazakhstan (2008–2021)
- Residence: Astana, Kazakhstan
- Born: 12 September 1987 (age 39) Moscow, Russian SFSR, Soviet Union
- Height: 1.80 m (5 ft 11 in)
- Turned pro: September 2005
- Retired: 1 October 2021
- Plays: Right-handed (two-handed backhand)
- Prize money: US$ 6,717,223

Singles
- Career record: 357–278
- Career titles: 1
- Highest ranking: No. 25 (29 October 2012)

Grand Slam singles results
- Australian Open: 3R (2015)
- French Open: QF (2010, 2012)
- Wimbledon: QF (2016)
- US Open: 4R (2016)

Other tournaments
- Olympic Games: 1R (2021)

Doubles
- Career record: 286–187
- Career titles: 13
- Highest ranking: No. 3 (22 February 2016)

Grand Slam doubles results
- Australian Open: QF (2012)
- French Open: F (2015)
- Wimbledon: W (2010)
- US Open: W (2010)

Grand Slam mixed doubles results
- Australian Open: SF (2013)
- French Open: F (2010)
- Wimbledon: SF (2016)
- US Open: QF (2015, 2016, 2021)

Team competitions
- Fed Cup: 25–18
Medal record
Women's tennis
Representing Kazakhstan
Asian Games
| Bronze medal – third place | 2014 Incheon | Team event |

Yaroslava Vyacheslavovna Shvedova (Яросла́ва Вячесла́вовна Шве́дова; born 12 September 1987) is a Kazakhstani former professional tennis player. Before 2008, she represented her country of birth, Russia.

She won one singles title on the WTA Tour and 13 career doubles titles, plus one singles and one doubles title on WTA 125 tournaments, as well as four singles and three doubles titles on the ITF Circuit. On 29 October 2012, she reached her best singles ranking of world No. 25. On 22 February 2016, she peaked at No. 3 in the WTA doubles rankings.

Shvedova made three major singles quarterfinals: at the 2010 and the 2012 French Open, and also at the 2016 Wimbledon Championships. She won two Grand Slam women's doubles titles, at the 2010 Wimbledon Championships and the 2010 US Open, partnering American player Vania King in both. Shvedova is also one of only seven players to record a golden set (i.e. a set in which every point is won by the same player) in the Open era. She achieved this feat in 2012 at Wimbledon in her match against Sara Errani, the only time a golden set was recorded in a Grand Slam championship.

== Career ==
=== 2006–2008: Major debut, maiden career title, top 100 ===
In February 2007, she unexpectedly reached the final of the Bangalore Open, beating home-crowd favourite and No. 2 seed Sania Mirza in the quarterfinals. In the final, she defeated top-seeded defending champion Mara Santangelo in straight sets, to win her first WTA Tour title. This win caused her to be in the top 100 for the first time, at 78.

At the 2007 Miami Open, she came through qualifying and impressively recorded her first-ever top 20 win over future No. 1, Ana Ivanovic, in the second round, beating her in two sets. However, Tathiana Garbin beat her in the third round.

In August 2008, she won an ITF Circuit title in Monterrey, Mexico, defeating Magdaléna Rybáriková in the final in two sets. Just over a week later, she won through the qualifying rounds for US Open, but lost to Agnieszka Radwańska in the first round.

=== 2009: French Open and US Open third rounds ===
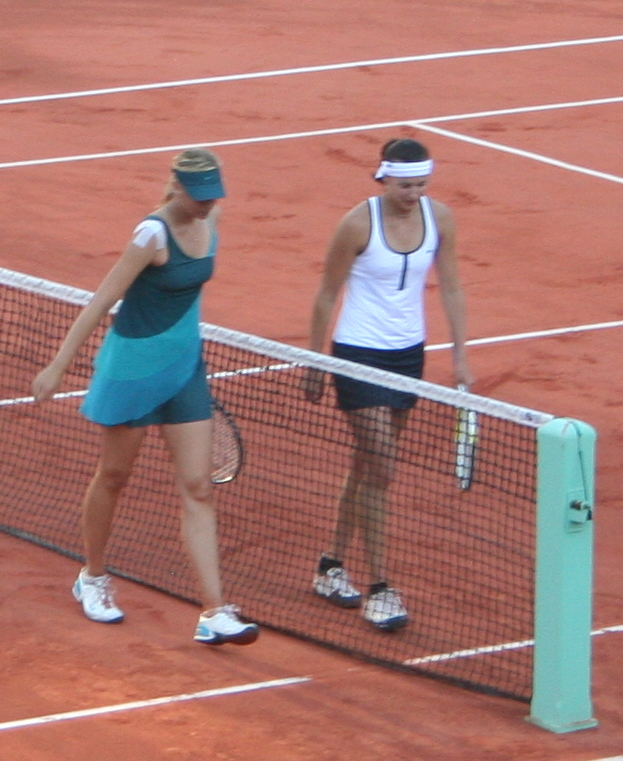
Shvedova after her match against Maria Sharapova at the 2009 French Open

In 2009, Shvedova qualified for the main draw at Roland Garros, defeating Americans Shenay Perry in the first qualifying round and Angela Haynes in the second. She then beat Elena Baltacha in the final qualifying round to enter the main draw. She beat Kaia Kanepi and advanced to the third round after defeating Arantxa Rus, also a qualifier. There, she lost in a close three-sets match to former world No. 1, Maria Sharapova, returning from a long-lasting shoulder injury and then ranked 102.

At Wimbledon, she faced Monica Niculescu in the first round and defeated her with the loss of just one game, but lost to American teenager Melanie Oudin in the second. At the US Open, Shvedova pulled off the biggest win of her career by beating then No. 5 Jelena Janković in three sets, in a match where she saved two match points.

=== 2010: Two major doubles titles & one singles quarterfinal ===
Shvedova experienced a good run at the Miami Open. She gained direct entry into the main draw and won a tight first-round match against wildcard Ajla Tomljanović. She then defeated 23rd seed Sabine Lisicki in the second round after she retired whilst trailing 3–6, 1–0. In the third round, Shvedova advanced against unseeded Andrea Petkovic by winning another close match. She fell to sixth seed Agnieszka Radwańska in the fourth round, in straight sets.

At the Barcelona Open, Shvedova defeated Anabel Medina Garrigues in the first round before upsetting fourth-seeded Maria Kirilenko in the second. Next, she defeated Iveta Benešová, before falling to eventual tournament and the eventual French Open champion Francesca Schiavone in the semifinals.

Shvedova enjoyed arguably her best career result at the French Open. There, she advanced to the quarterfinals in the singles competition. She defeated eighth seed Agnieszka Radwańska, avenging her loss to her in Miami, en route to the quarterfinals. As the last unseeded player in the tournament, Shvedova was defeated by fourth seed Jelena Janković in the quarterfinal. In mixed doubles, she partnered with Julian Knowle to reach the final, beating doubles legends Cara Black and Leander Paes, the second seeds, along the way. They fell in a close final to sixth seeds Katarina Srebotnik and Nenad Zimonjić.

At the Wimbledon Championships, Shvedova entered the doubles competition unseeded with partner Vania King. The two began playing together at the start of the grass-court season two weeks before, and were only in their third event together. In a stunning string of upsets, Shvedova and King won the tournament, beating Elena Vesnina and Vera Zvonareva (who themselves beat Serena and Venus Williams in the quarterfinals) in the final.

Both Shvedova and King continued their good form onto the hardcourts of the US Open. Seeded sixth, the team continued to win match after match, before taking a spot in their second consecutive major final, this time facing Liezel Huber and Nadia Petrova. King and Shvedova won in three sets; the match was played over two days due to heavy rainfall.

=== 2011 ===
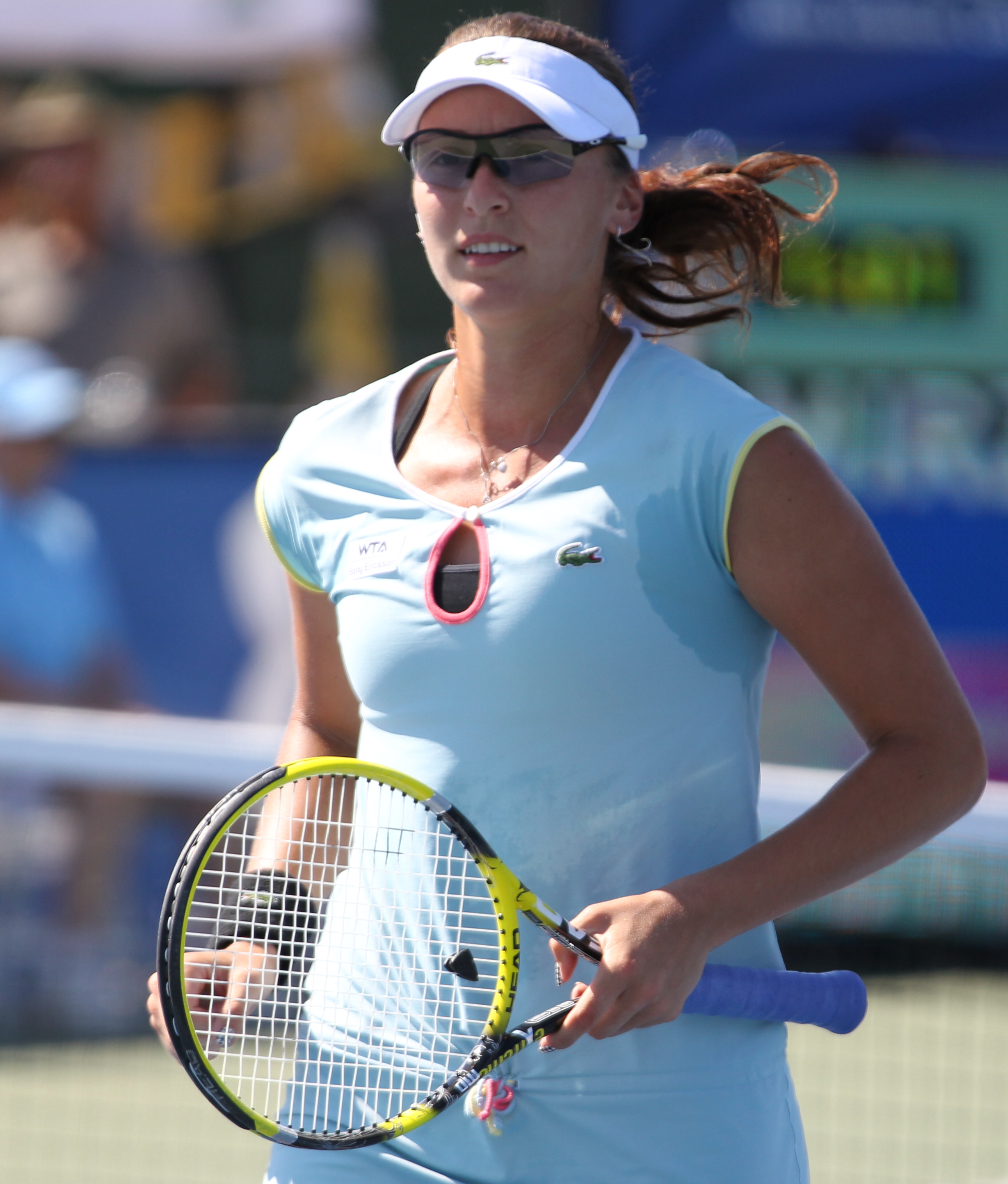
Shvedova at the 2011 Washington Open

Shvedova began her season representing Kazakhstan at the Hopman Cup. She lost her first match to Ana Ivanovic in two sets. During her match against Ivanovic, Shvedova injured her right knee which caused her to pull out of the Hopman Cup. Shvedova also missed the Australian Open due to the same right knee injury.

She returned from injury in February to play at Dubai where she lost in the first round to Zhang Shuai. She went to play at the Qatar Open; seeded fifth for qualifying, she was defeated in the first round by wildcard Elena Vesnina. In March, she travelled to Indian Wells where she lost in the first round to Kimiko Date-Krumm. At the Miami Open, after beating Sara Errani Shvedova retired in her second-round match against 28th seed Jarmila Groth due to a left thigh muscle strain.

She began her clay-court season in Morocco at the Rabat Grand Prix. Seeded second, she was defeated in the second round by Anastasia Pivovarova. At the Barcelona Open, Shvedova lost in the second round to sixth seed and eventual champion Roberta Vinci. Playing at the Madrid Open, Shvedova lost in the first round to 10th seed Agnieszka Radwańska. At the Italian Open, she lost in the first round to qualifier Anastasia Rodionova in straight sets. In doubles, she and Vania King reached the final where they lost to Peng Shuai and Zheng Jie, also in straight sets. Shvedova entered the French Open ranked No. 54 and lost in the first round to 14th seed Anastasia Pavlyuchenkova. As a result of not defending her quarterfinalist points from the previous year, her ranking dropped to No. 115. In doubles, she and her regular doubles partner, Vania King, reached the semifinals where they fell to eventual champions Andrea Hlaváčková/Lucie Hradecká in two sets.

Shvedova began grass-court season at the Birmingham Classic seeded 11th, and lost in the second round to Marina Erakovic. At the Eastbourne International, she lost in the first round of qualifying to Mirjana Lučić-Baroni. Ranked world No. 123 at Wimbledon, she was easily defeated in the first round by qualifier Tamarine Tanasugarn.

Shvedova began wearing prescription sports glasses, after seeking medical advice about a nervous tic in one eye.

She started her US Open Series at the Washington Open and was defeated in the first round by sixth seed Elena Baltacha. In doubles, Shvedova and Sania Mirza won the title defeating Olga Govortsova/Alla Kudryavtseva in the final. Ranked world No. 143 at the Vancouver Open, Shvedova lost in the first round to seventh seed Stéphanie Dubois. She then played at the Bronx Open where she reached the second round and lost to Romina Oprandi, after retiring early in the second set. Due to her ranking of 212, Shvedova had to play qualifying in order to make it into the main draw of the US Open. She lost in the first round of qualifying to Ekaterina Bychkova in two tie-breakers. In doubles, she and Vania King were the defending champions; they reached the final for a second year in a row but lost to Liezel Huber and Lisa Raymond.

Seeded eighth for qualifying at the Korea Open, Shvedova qualified for the main draw beating wildcard Choi Ji-hee, Han Sung-hee, and third seed Rika Fujiwara. In the first round, she upset Tamarine Tanasugarn. In the second round, Shvedova retired after losing the first set 6–7 to fourth seed Dominika Cibulková. She qualified for the Japan Women's Open, defeating sixth seed Kristina Mladenovic, wildcard Risa Ozaki, and Hsieh Su-wei. Shvedova was defeated in the second round by seventh seed Chanelle Scheepers. In doubles, she and Vania King advanced to the final where they lost to Date-Krumm/Zhang. Shvedova played her final tournament of the year at the Taipei Ladies Open. She reached the quarterfinals but lost to eighth seed Chang Kai-chen, in straight sets.

Shvedova ended the year as No. 206, her lowest year-end singles ranking since 2005. She also won four WTA Tour doubles titles. Her decline in form in singles was explained by a knee injury that required surgery.

=== 2012 ===
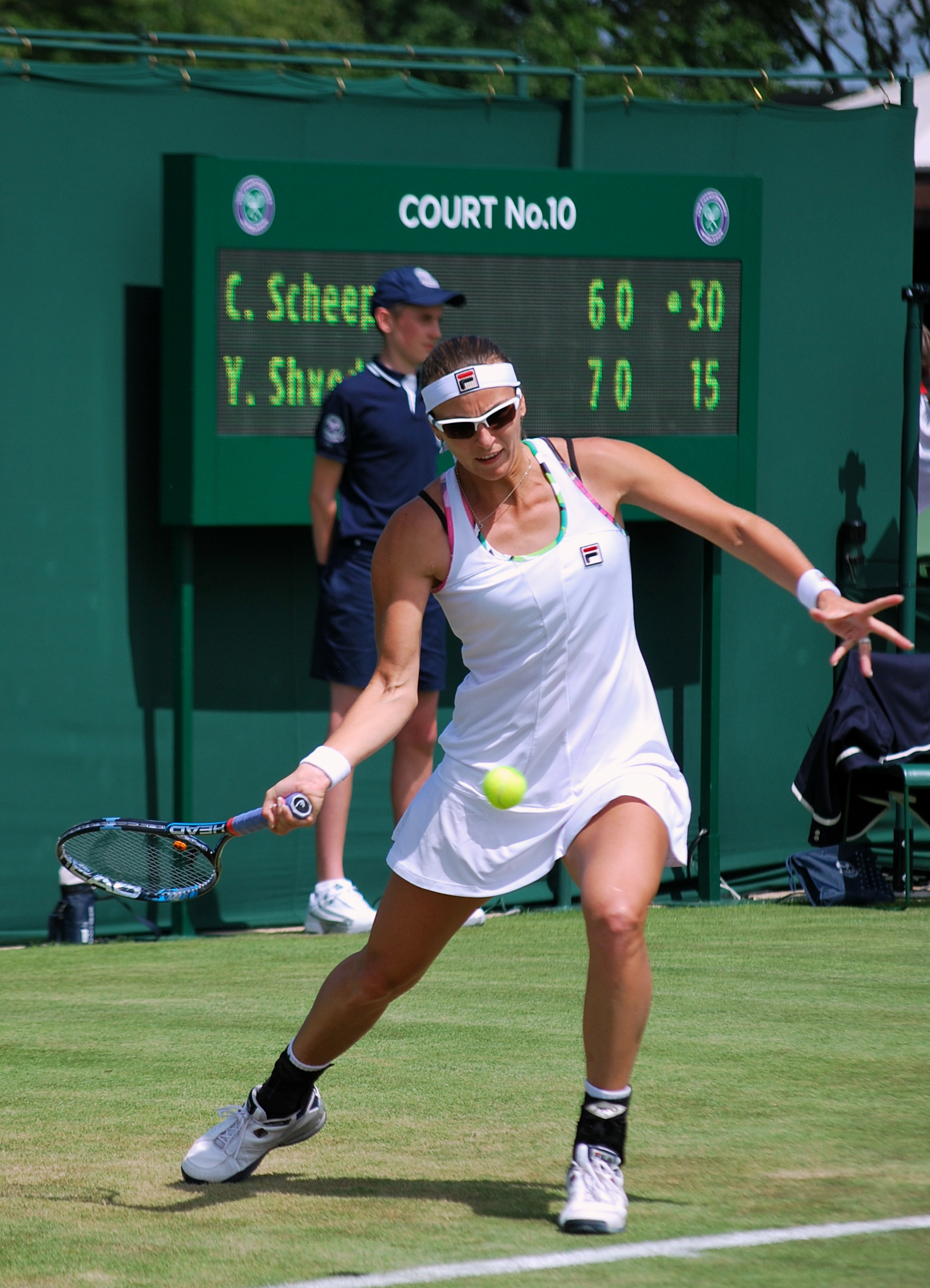
Shvedova at the 2012 Wimbledon Championships

Shvedova started the year playing qualifying at the Australian Open. She lost in the first round of qualifying to Bibiane Schoofs in a marathon three-set match.

She then rebounded, qualifying into the main draw at Copa Colsanitas defeating Raluca Olaru and Leticia Costas. In the main draw, Shvedova reached the quarterfinals where she fell to Tímea Babos. Receiving a wildcard to play at the Monterrey Open, she beat countrywoman Sesil Karatantcheva in the first round. She lost to Mandy Minella in the second round in three sets. At the Abierto Mexicano, Shvedova retired due to a left thigh injury in the final round of qualifying to top seed Edina Gallovits-Hall. Seeded fourth at the $25k event in Irapuato, she reached the final where she lost to sixth seed Kiki Bertens. Shvedova continued her rise in form at another $25K event in Poza Rica, where she won the title beating Monica Puig in the final.

Shvedova started her clay-court season by playing qualifying at the Charleston Open. Seeded 20th for qualifying, she qualified for the main draw defeating Jessica Pegula and tenth seed Andrea Hlaváčková. In the main draw, she reached the third round by defeating Alexandra Panova and 12th seed Yanina Wickmayer. In the third round, she lost to sixth seed Sabine Lisicki. Seeded seventh for qualifying at the Rabat Grand Prix, Shvedova lost in the second round of qualifying to Bianca Botto. At the Portugal Open, she was defeated in the first round of qualifying by Bianca Botto. Due to having a low ranking, Shvedova played qualifying at the French Open and won against Ajla Tomljanović, CoCo Vandeweghe, and Elena Bogdan. In the main draw, she defeated Mandy Minella, Sofia Arvidsson, and Carla Suárez Navarro in the first three rounds. In the fourth round, she upset seventh seed and defending champion Li Na, 3–6, 6–2, 6–0, the biggest win of her career in singles, to advance to her second French Open quarterfinal. There, she lost to fourth seed and reigning Wimbledon champion, Petra Kvitová, in three sets. Due to making the quarterfinals at the French Open, Shvedova's ranking went from 142 to 62. In doubles, she and Vania King reached the quarterfinals, before losing to seventh seeds and eventual finalists Maria Kirilenko/Nadia Petrova.

On 15 June 2012, Shvedova and her partner, Sania Mirza, made a shock first-round exit from the Birmingham Classic losing to Iveta Benešová/Alla Kudryavtseva in two sets. At the Wimbledon Championships, Shvedova received a wildcard into the main draw, and defeated Chanelle Scheepers and Kiki Bertens to reach the third round. There she faced tenth seed Sara Errani and won the fourth "Golden Set" in the history of tennis. She won all 24 points in the 15-minute-long first set, blasting 14 winners and making no unforced errors before losing the first point of the second set to break the sequence. She went on to win the match in straight sets 6–0, 6–4 reaching the second week of Wimbledon for the first time. In the fourth round, she was defeated by sixth seed and eventual champion, Serena Williams.

Representing Kazakhstan at the 2012 London Olympics, she reached the second round of the women's singles where she lost to 15th seed Sabine Lisicki. In doubles, she reached the second round with partner Galina Voskoboeva.

As the top seed for qualifying at the Cincinnati Open, Shvedova qualified for the main draw beating wildcard Lauren Davis and 14th seed Anna Tatishvili. She beat 16th seed Lucie Šafářová in the first round. In the second round, Shvedova was up against qualifier Urszula Radwańska and won the first set 6–4; Urszula was leading 4–1 in the second set when Shvedova retired due to heat illness. At the Texas Tennis Open, Shvedova lost in the first round in a tough three set match to second seed and eventual finalist Jelena Janković. Ranked 45 at the US Open, Shvedova was defeated in the second round by 20th seed and eventual quarterfinalist Roberta Vinci.

At the Pan Pacific Open, Shvedova lost in the first round to 2010 French Open champion Francesca Schiavone. At the China Open, Shvedova faced 12th seed Dominika Cibulková in the first round. Shvedova won the first set 6–4 and was leading 4–1 in the second set when Cibulková retired due to a left hip injury. In the second round, she was defeated by Peng Shuai. Seeded fifth at Osaka, she lost in the first round to wildcard Tamarine Tanasugarn. Shvedova played her final tournament of the year at the Kremlin Cup. She beat Anastasia Pavlyuchenkova but in the second round, she was defeated by seventh seed Maria Kirilenko.

Shvedova ended the year ranked 29 in singles and 26 in doubles.

=== 2013 ===
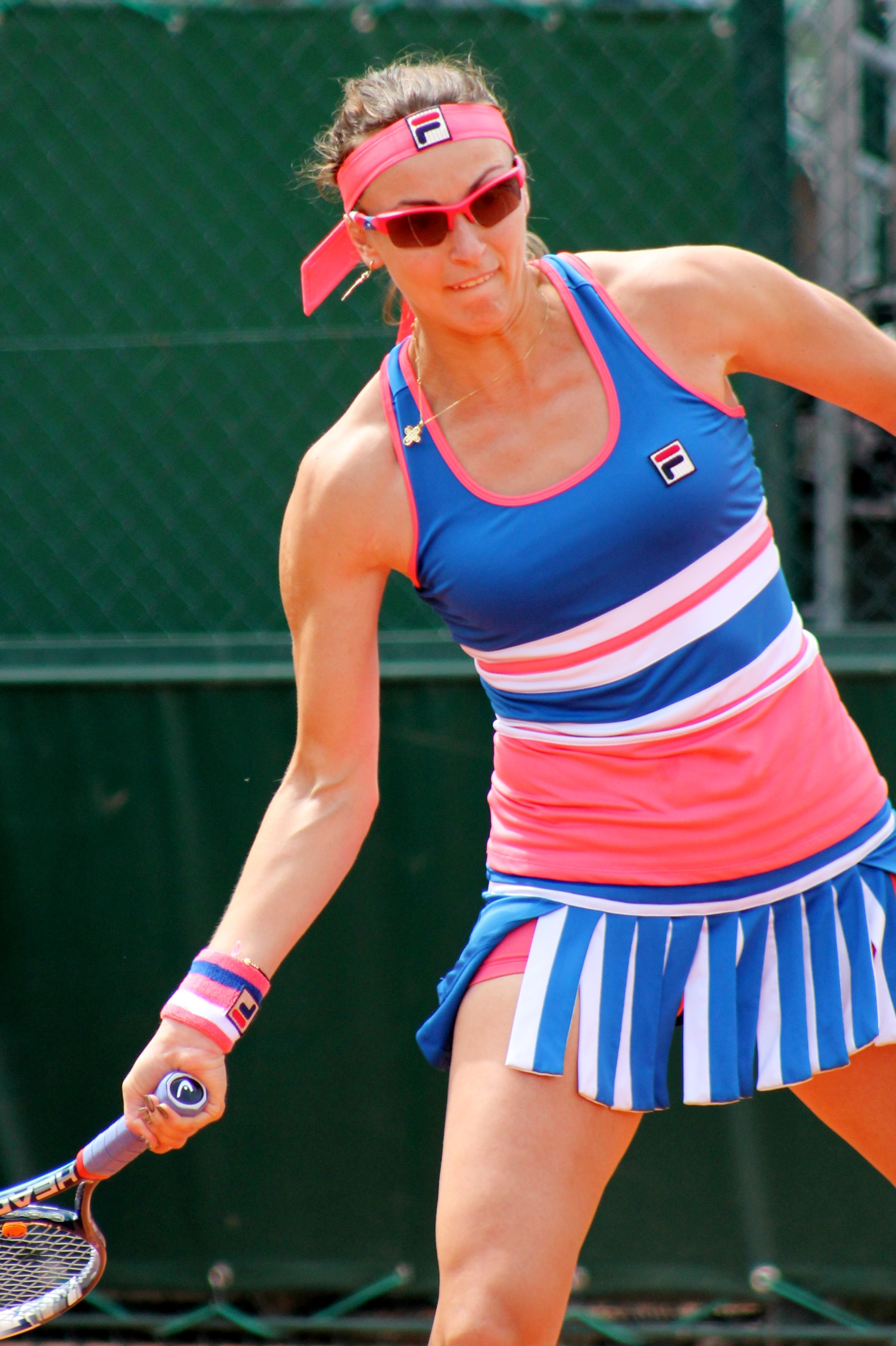
Shvedova at the 2013 French Open

Shvedova began her year at the Auckland Open. Seeded sixth, she defeated Lara Arruabarrena in the first round, but lost in the second round to Elena Vesnina. In doubles, Shvedova and her partner Julia Görges both reached the final, but they lost to Cara Black/Anastasia Rodionova. Seeded fourth at the Hobart International, Shvedova was defeated in the second round to eventual champion Elena Vesnina. Seeded 28th at the Australian Open, Shvedova lost in the first round to Annika Beck.

Seeded second at the first edition of the Brasil Tennis Cup, Shvedova was defeated in the first round by Melinda Czink in three sets. However, in doubles, she and her partner Medina Garrigues won the title defeating Anne Keothavong/Valeria Savinykh in the final. Seeded 31st at the Indian Wells Open, Shvedova got a bye into the second round where she lost to qualifier Lesia Tsurenko. At the Miami Open, Shvedova lost in the first round to Zheng Jie.

Shvedova started her clay-court season at the Charleston Open. As the 14th seed, she lost in the first round to qualifier Vania King. At the Porsche Tennis Grand Prix, Shvedova reached the quarterfinals with wins over Roberta Vinci and Carla Suárez Navarro. In the quarterfinals, she lost to third seed Angelique Kerber. Shvedova stunned tenth seed and former world No. 1, Caroline Wozniacki, in the first round at the Madrid Open, 6–2, 6–4, and beat Kirsten Flipkens in the second. Shvedova withdrew from her third-round match against wildcard Medina Garrigues due to a right arm injury. Seeded 27th at the French Open, Shvedova had quarterfinalist points to defend from last year. In the first round, she defeated CoCo Vandeweghe. However, she was defeated in the second round by qualifier Paula Ormaechea. As a result, Shvedova failed to defend her quarterfinalist points from last year, and her ranking dropped from 31 to 52.

Ranked 55 at Wimbledon, Shvedova beat Kiki Bertens and then withdrew from her second-round match against 2011 Wimbledon champion, Petra Kvitová, due to an arm injury.

She returned to action at the New Haven Open and retired in the final round of qualifying to fifth seed Stefanie Vögele. Ranked 78 at the US Open, Shvedova reached the third round defeating Olga Puchkova and lucky loser Patricia Mayr-Achleitner. She lost in the third round to world No. 1 and eventual champion, Serena Williams, in straight sets.

Seeded eighth at the Tashkent Open, Shvedova lost in the first round to Vesna Dolonc. In doubles, she and Tímea Babos won the title defeating Mandy Minella/Olga Govortsova in the final. At the Guangzhou International Open, she lost to Zheng Jie in the first round. Seeded seventh at the Ningbo International Open, Shvedova reached the quarterfinals defeating Tímea Babos and wildcard Zheng Saisai. She then lost in the quarterfinals to fourth seed Yvonne Meusburger. Seeded tenth for qualifying at the China Open, Shvedova lost in the second round of qualifying to Sharon Fichman. At the Kremlin Cup, she was defeated in the first round by Elena Vesnina, 6–1, 6–2. Competing at the first edition of the Nanjing Ladies Open, Shvedova lost in the first round to second seed Yanina Wickmayer. She played her final tournament of the year at the Taipei Ladies Open. In the first round, she upset fourth seed Ayumi Morita in the first round. However, in doubles, Shvedova and Caroline Garcia won the title defeating Anna-Lena Friedsam/Alison Van Uytvanck in the final.

Shvedova ended the year ranked 81 in singles and 59 in doubles.

=== 2014 ===
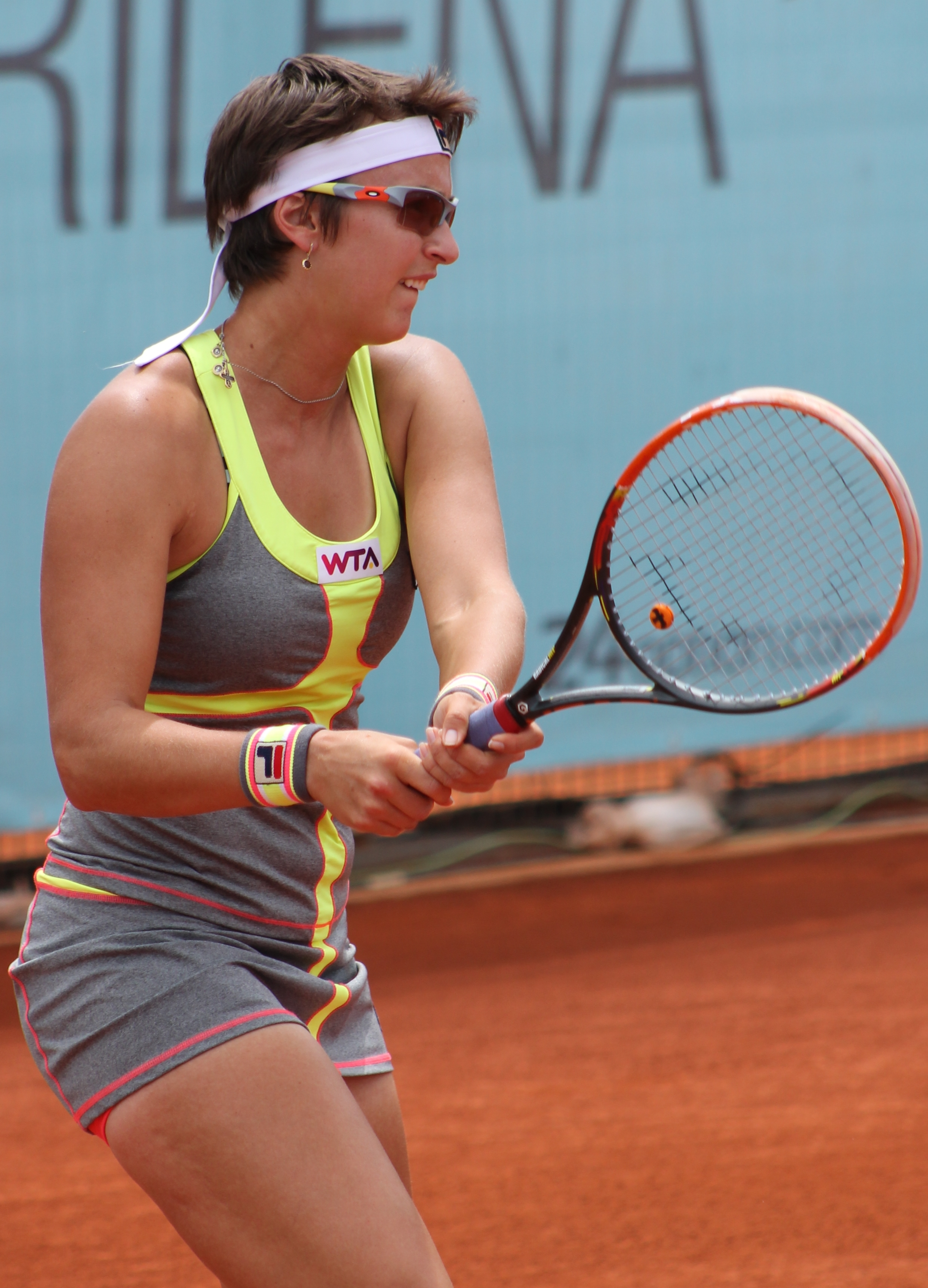
Shvedova at the 2014 Madrid Open

Shvedova began the year at the Brisbane International. As the top seed for qualifying, she lost in the second round of qualifying to Anastasia Rodionova. Seeded 12th in qualifying at the Sydney International, Shvedova was defeated in the final round of qualifying by fifth seed Christina McHale. At the Australian Open, she lost in the first round to 13th seed Sloane Stephens.

At the first edition of the Rio Open, Shvedova lost in the first round to Patricia Mayr-Achleitner. At the Brasil Tennis Cup, Shvedova reached the semifinals with wins over Sílvia Soler Espinosa, Barbora Záhlavová-Strýcová, and sixth seed Alexandra Cadanţu. She lost in the semifinals to second seed Garbiñe Muguruza. In doubles, she and her partner Medina Garrigues won the title defeating Schiavone/Soler Espinosa in the final.

Shvedova, as the third seed, qualified for the Indian Wells Open by beating Magda Linette and 13th seed Kimiko Date-Krumm. In the main draw, she reached the third round defeating Chanelle Scheepers and 24th seed Kaia Kanepi. In the third round, she lost to tenth seed and former world No. 1, Caroline Wozniacki. At the Miami Open, Shvedova defeated 2010 French Open Champion Francesca Schiavone in the first round. In the second round, Shvedova lost to world No. 1 and eventual champion, Serena Williams.

Shvedova began her clay-court season at the Charleston Open. She defeated qualifier Zheng Saisai in the first round but lost in the second round to seventh seed Samantha Stosur. In doubles, she and Medina Garrigues won the title defeating Chan Hao-ching/Chan Yung-jan in the final. At the Portugal Open, Shvedova defeated Karin Knapp in the first round. She lost in the second round to second seed Eugenie Bouchard, 4–6, 2–6. Seeded seventh for qualifying at the Madrid Open, she lost in the first round to Mariana Duque Mariño. Shvedova reached the quarterfinals at the Nürnberger Versicherungscup defeating Patricia Mayr-Achleitner and sixth seed Kurumi Nara. She lost to second seed and eventual champion Eugenie Bouchard in the quarterfinals. Ranked world No. 69 at the French Open, Shvedova won her first-round match over Lauren Davis. In the second round, she lost to wild card Pauline Parmentier.

Shvedova played at the Rosmalen Open, her only grass-court tune-up tournament before Wimbledon. She upset second seed Dominika Cibulková in the first round. In the second round, she defeated in a tight match wild card Michaëlla Krajicek. Shvedova lost in the quarterfinals to eighth seed Klára Koukalová, 2–6, 4–6. At Wimbledon, Shvedova defeated wildcard Kristýna Plíšková in a first-round thriller. In the second round, she beat last year quarterfinalist Kaia Kanepi. In the third round, she faced Madison Keys. Shvedova won the first set 7–6; the second set was tied 6–6 when Keys retired due to a right thigh injury. In the fourth round, Shvedova lost to 19th seed and last year finalist Sabine Lisicki.

Seeded fourth at the Swedish Open, Shvedova was upset in the first round by qualifier Laura Siegemund.

Seeded tenth for qualifying at the Cincinnati Open, she lost in the first round of qualifying to American wildcard Nicole Gibbs. At the US Open, Shvedova lost in the first round to Monica Niculescu.

Shvedova had a first-round loss at the Korea Open to Anna-Lena Friedsam. She played her final tournament of the year at the China Open and was defeated in the first round by Roberta Vinci.

Shvedova ended the year ranked 66.

=== 2015 ===
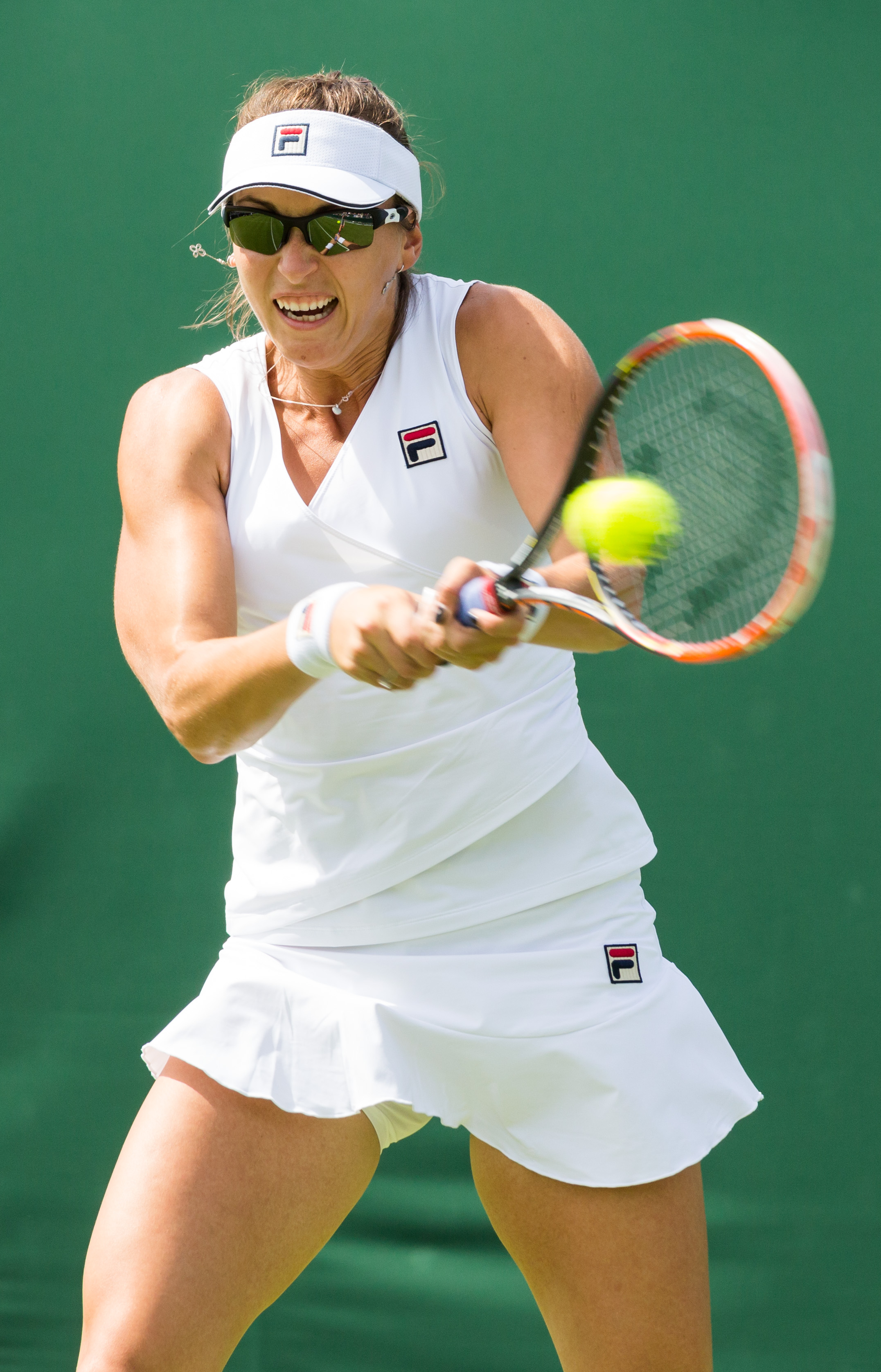
Shvedova at the 2015 Wimbledon Championships

Shvedova began her 2015 year at the Brisbane International. Getting past qualifying, she beat Sabine Lisicki in the first round. In the second round, she lost to top seed and eventual champion Maria Sharapova. At the Sydney International, Shvedova was defeated in the first round of qualifying by Kateřina Siniaková. In Melbourne at the Australian Open, Shvedova upset 16th seed Lucie Šafářová in a first-round thriller. She then beat Monica Puig in the second round. In the third round, Shvedova lost to 21st seed Peng Shuai.

At the Miami Open, Shvedova was defeated in the first round by Johanna Larsson.

Shvedova began her clay-court season at the Charleston Open. In the first round, she beat Stefanie Vögele. In the second round, Shvedova lost to 13th seed Irina-Camelia Begu. Seeded fifth at the Copa Colsanitas, Shvedova reached her first WTA singles final since 2007 defeating Maryna Zanevska, qualifier Sachia Vickery, second seed Monica Puig, and Mariana Duque Mariño. In the final, Shvedova lost to Teliana Pereira. At the Madrid Open, she lost in the first round of qualifying to Sesil Karatantcheva. However, in doubles, she and Casey Dellacqua won the title defeating Muguruza/Suárez Navarro in the final. At the Nürnberger Versicherungscup, Shvedova was defeated in the first round by Kiki Bertens. Ranked 69 at the French Open, she lost in the first round to seventh seed and 2008 champion, Ana Ivanovic. In doubles, she and her partner, Casey Dellacqua, reached the final where they lost to Mattek-Sands/Šafářová.

Shvedova only played one grass-court warm-up tournament before Wimbledon. At the Rosmalen Open, she stunned top seed Eugenie Bouchard in the first round. In the second round, she beat Marina Erakovic. In the quarterfinals, Shvedova was defeated by fifth seed and eventual champion, Camila Giorgi. Ranked 79 at Wimbledon, Shvedova lost in the first round to Mirjana Lučić-Baroni.

At the Bucharest Open, she lost in the final round of qualifying to Cristina Dinu. In Turkey at the İstanbul Cup, Shvedova lost in the first round to Bojana Jovanovski.

Shvedova began her US Open Series at the Rogers Cup. She lost in the second round of qualifying to Monica Puig. At the Cincinnati Open, Shvedova qualified for the main draw defeating Jarmila Gajdošová and Mariana Duque Mariño. In the first round, she upset ninth seed Garbiñe Muguruza. In the second round, she was defeated by Anastasia Pavlyuchenkova. In doubles, she and Dellacqua reached the final but lost to Chan Hao-ching/Chan Yung-jan. Seeded second for qualifying at the US Open, Shvedova lost in the final round of qualifying to Tereza Mrdeža. In doubles, Shvedova and Dellacqua advanced to the final where they were defeated by Hingis/Mirza.

At the Korea Open, Shvedova faced Christina McHale in her first-round match. McHale won the first set 6–4; Shvedova led 2–1 in the second set when she abandoned the match. At the Tashkent Open, Shvedova beat eighth seed Andreea Mitu in the first round. In the second round, she lost to Evgeniya Rodina. At the China Open, Shvedova lost in the final round of qualifying to eighth seed Irina Falconi. Shvedova then played for the first time at the Hong Kong Open where she beat Jarmila Gajdošová in the first round. In the second, she was defeated by eighth seed and doubles partner, Alizé Cornet. In doubles, Shvedova and Cornet won the title beating Lara Arruabarrena/Andreja Klepač. Seeded fourth at the first edition of the Hua Hin Championships, Shvedova reached the final defeating wildcard Kamonwan Buayam, qualifier Liu Chang, Duan Yingying, and Wang Qiang. In the final, Shvedova beat Naomi Osaka for her first WTA 125 title. Shvedova played her final tournament of the year at the Taipei Challenger. Seeded second, she made it to the quarterfinals beating Marina Melnikova and Amandine Hesse. In the quarterfinals, Shvedova faced fifth seed Kirsten Flipkens. Shvedova won the first set 6–4; Flipkens was leading 2–1 in the second set when Shvedova pulled out of the tournament.

Shvedova ended the year ranked 82 in singles and No. 6 in doubles.

=== 2016 ===
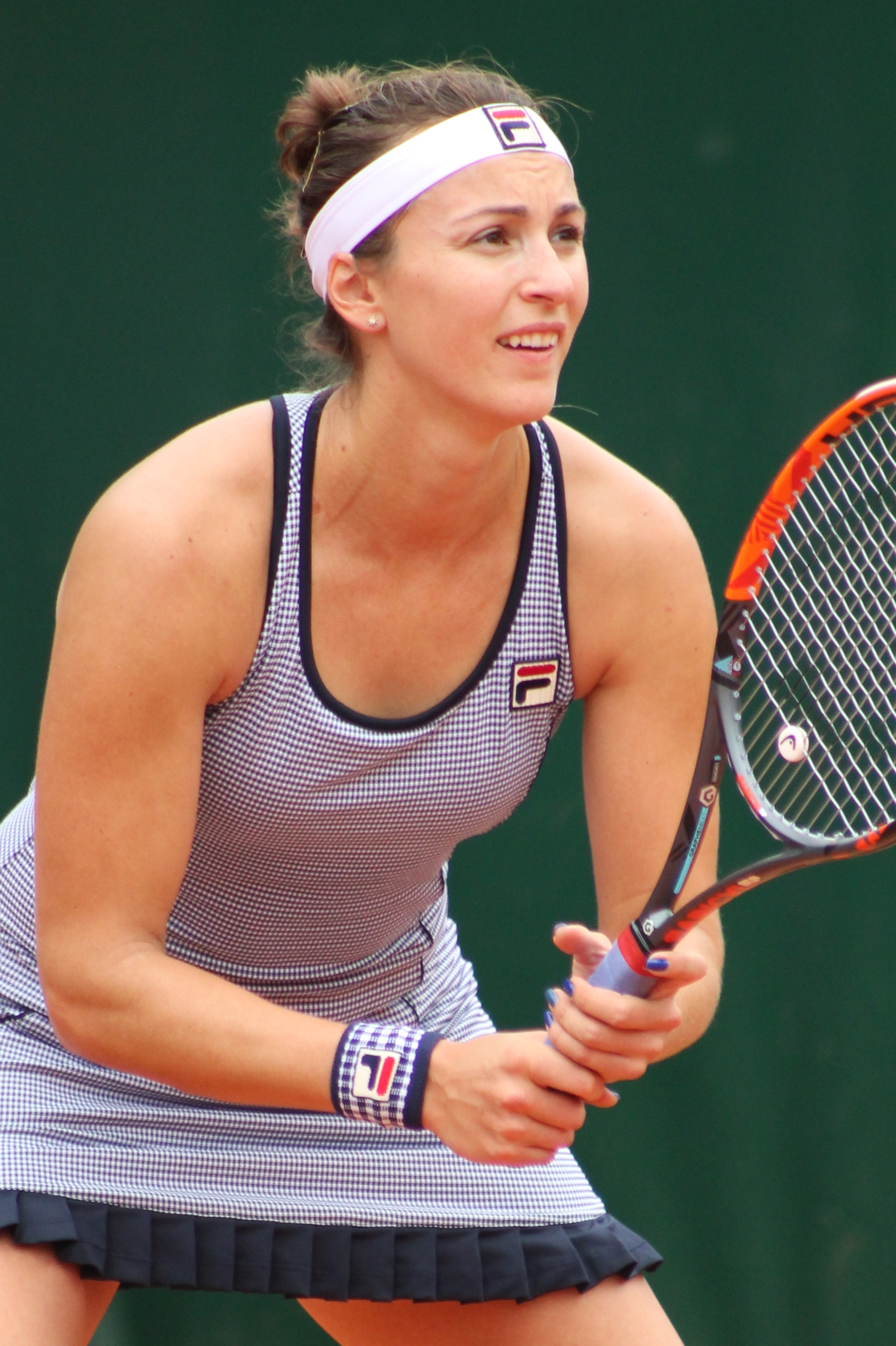
Shvedova at the 2016 French Open

Shvedova started the year at the Shenzhen Open. Coming through qualifying, she lost in the first round to Anett Kontaveit. At the Sydney International, Shvedova retired during her qualifying first-round match against Sesil Karatantcheva. At the Australian Open, she won her first-round match over Tsvetana Pironkova. In the second round, she lost to 15th seed Madison Keys.

Getting past qualifying at the DubaiChampionships, Shvedova stunned seventh seed Roberta Vinci in the first round, before she was defeated by eventual champion Sara Errani. At the Qatar Ladies Open, Shvedova lost in the first round to Nao Hibino. At the Indian Wells Open, she won her first two rounds over qualifier Kristýna Plíšková and 11th seed Lucie Šafářová. In the third round, she was defeated by qualifier Nicole Gibbs. At the Miami Open, Shvedova lost in the final round of qualifying to Kristýna Plíšková. In doubles, she and Tímea Babos reached the final where they lost to Mattek-Sands/Šafářová.

Shvedova started her clay-court season at the Charleston Open where she was defeated in the second round by fifth seed Sara Errani. Playing at the Madrid Open, she lost in the first round of qualifying to Mariana Duque. At the Italian Open, Shvedova was defeated in the first round of qualifying by Ana Konjuh. She played her final tournament before the French Open at Internationaux de Strasbourg and lost in the first round to lucky loser Virginie Razzano. At the French Open, Shvedova was defeated in the first round by 13th seed and 2009 French Open champion Svetlana Kuznetsova.

She began her grass-court season at the Rosmalen Open where she was defeated in the first round by third seed and eventual finalist Kristina Mladenovic. However, in doubles, Shvedova and Oksana Kalashnikova won the title defeating Xenia Knoll and Aleksandra Krunić in the final. Playing at the first edition of the Mallorca Open, Shvedova lost in the first round to Daniela Hantuchová. At the Eastbourne International, she lost in the second round of qualifying to Alison Van Uytvanck. Competing at the Wimbledon Championships, Shvedova reached the quarterfinals in singles for the first time in her career defeating Julia Görges, 17th seed Elina Svitolina, 2013 Wimbledon finalist Sabine Lisicki, and 28th seed Lucie Šafářová. In her quarterfinal match, she lost to eighth seed, five-time Wimbledon champion, and former world No. 1, Venus Williams. In doubles, Shvedova and Tímea Babos reached the final upsetting top seeds Hingis/Mirza en route to the final. In the final, Shvedova and Babos lost to the Williams sisters. Due to her quarterfinals result at Wimbledon, Shvedova's singles ranking improved from 96 to 49.

Seeded seventh at the Swedish Open, Shvedova retired during her first-round match against Mona Barthel due to a mid-back injury. Representing Kazakhstan at the 2016 Rio Olympics, Shvedova lost in the first round to Misaki Doi of Japan. In doubles, she and her compatriot, Galina Voskoboeva, faced Kirsten Flipkens/Yanina Wickmayer in the first round. Flipkens/Wickmayer won the first set 6–1. The match was not continued because Shvedova and Voskoboeva pulled out of the doubles event at the Olympics.

In Cincinnati at the Western & Southern Open, Shvedova lost in the first round of qualifying to Ana Konjuh. At the US Open, Shvedova made it to the fourth round for the first time in her career defeating Lara Arruabarrena, Wang Qiang, and Zhang Shuai. In the fourth round, she was defeated by top seed Serena Williams.

In China at the Wuhan Open, Shvedova reached the third round with wins over wildcard Zheng Saisai and 13th seed Roberta Vinci. She lost in the third round to fourth seed Simona Halep. In Beijing at the China Open, Shvedova advanced to the quarterfinals defeating seventh seed Carla Suárez Navarro, Belinda Bencic, and Alizé Cornet. She lost in her quarterfinal match to third seed and eventual champion, Agnieszka Radwańska. Seeded eighth at her final tournament of the year at the Tianjin Open, Shvedova was defeated in the first round by Naomi Osaka.

She ended the year ranked 33.

=== 2017 ===
Shvedova withdrew from the Shenzhen Open due to a left foot injury. She started at the Sydney International where she lost in the first round of qualifying to Naomi Broady. At the Australian Open, she suffered a first-round loss by 27th seed Irina-Camelia Begu.

Competing at the St. Petersburg Trophy, Shvedova lost in the first round to Russian wildcard Natalia Vikhlyantseva. At Dubai, she was defeated in the first round by Monica Puig. In March, she played at Indian Wells where she again lost in the first round, to American qualifier Varvara Lepchenko. In Miami, she had her first win of the year when she beat Jelena Janković. In the second round, she was defeated by 17th seed Anastasia Pavlyuchenkova.

Shvedova started on clay court at the Morocco Open where she was eliminated in the second round by Tatjana Maria. At the Madrid Open, she was defeated in the first round by eighth seed Svetlana Kuznetsova. In Rome, she lost in the first round to ninth seed Venus Williams. Seeded seventh at the Nürnberger Versicherungscup, she retired from her quarterfinal match due to an injury, after losing the first set to Misaki Doi. At the French Open, she lost in the first round to fifth seed Elina Svitolina.

Shvedova missed the Wimbledon Championships due to undergoing ankle surgery. As a result of this surgery, she missed the rest of the season.

She ended the year ranked 292.

=== 2020: Comeback ===
Following surgery and childbirth, Shvedova began her comeback in February at the Dubai Championships. Using a protected ranking, she played doubles alongside Darija Jurak. They lost in the first round to sisters Lyudmyla/Nadiia Kichenok. Shvedova played her first singles match since 2017 at Doha where she was defeated in the first round by qualifier Laura Siegemund. In doubles, she and Jurak lost in the first round to Russian team of Ekaterina Alexandrova and Anna Blinkova.

In March, she became the first player to face mandated quarantine during the COVID-19 pandemic.

Shvedova didn't play any more matches for the rest of the season. She ended the year without a ranking.

=== 2021: Olympic Games & retirement ===
Shvedova started her season in Dubai at the first edition of the Abu Dhabi Open and lost in the first round to qualifier Bianca Turati. At the first edition of the Yarra Valley Classic, she was beaten in her first-round match by Vera Lapko. Competing at the Australian Open for the first time since 2017, she fell in the first round to Camila Giorgi.

In March, Shvedova played at the Qatar Ladies Open but was eliminated in the second round of qualifying by Bethanie Mattek-Sands. At Dubai, she was beaten in the first round by Jessica Pegula. Playing at the Miami Open for the first time since 2017, she again lost in round one, to qualifier Tereza Martincová.

After Miami, Shvedova moved on toward the clay-court season. Playing at the Charleston Open for the first time since 2016, she was defeated in the first round by Misaki Doi. Competing in Madrid for the first time since 2017, she lost her first-round match to Ons Jabeur. At the Italian Open, she scored her first WTA Tour main-draw win since reaching the 2017 Nuremberg quarterfinals with a remarkable victory over Italian wildcard Martina Trevisan. She then was knocked out in the second round by top seed Ashleigh Barty.

Representing Kazakhstan at the Summer Olympics, Shvedova retired during her first-round match against Ajla Tomljanović due to heat illness. In August, at the Cincinnati Open, she lost in the first round of qualifying to Zhang Shuai. At the first edition of the Cleveland Open, she was defeated in the first round of qualifying by Linda Fruhvirtová. And again, at the US Open, she was eliminated in round one, by Jasmine Paolini.

On 1 October 2021, in a ceremony at the Astana Open, Shvedova announced her retirement from tennis. There was a celebration of her career as well.

== Playing style ==
Shvedova is noted for her powerful serve, groundstrokes, and proficient net play. Her favorite serve is the flat serve down the T, her weakness is her consistency on the forehand side.

== Personal life ==
Shvedova was born to Russian father Vyacheslav and Bashkir mother Nurzia, who used to be a professional runner (winner of the International Association of Ultra Runners 100 km World Championships, 1992). Shvedova has one brother. She began playing tennis at age 8 when her father introduced her to the sport in Chernogolovka (Moscow region). Shvedova changed her nationality from Russian to Kazakhstani in 2008 as part of the country's attempts to boost its sporting profile. Shvedova gave birth to twins in October 2018.

== Performance timeline ==
Key
| W | F | SF | QF | #R | RR | Q# | P# | DNQ | A | Z# | PO | G | S | B | NMS | NTI | P | NH |

(W) winner; (F) finalist; (SF) semifinalist; (QF) quarterfinalist; (#R) rounds 4, 3, 2, 1; (RR) round-robin stage; (Q#) qualification round; (P#) preliminary round; (DNQ) did not qualify; (A) absent; (Z#) Davis/Fed Cup Zonal Group (with number indication) or (PO) play-off; (G) gold, (S) silver or (B) bronze Olympic/Paralympic medal; (NMS) not a Masters tournament; (NTI) not a Tier I tournament; (P) postponed; (NH) not held; (SR) strike rate (events won / competed); (W–L) win–loss record.
To avoid confusion and double counting, these charts are updated at the conclusion of a tournament or when the player's participation has ended.

Only main-draw results in WTA Tour, Grand Slam tournaments, Fed Cup/Billie Jean King Cup and Olympic Games are included in win–loss records.

=== Singles ===
| | Russia | | | Kazakhstan | | | | | | | | | | | | | | | | |
| Tournament | 2005 | 2006 | 2007 | 2008 | 2009 | 2010 | 2011 | 2012 | 2013 | 2014 | 2015 | 2016 | 2017 | 2018 | 2019 | 2020 | 2021 | SR | W–L | Win% |
Grand Slam tournaments
| Australian Open | A | A | Q3 | 2R | 1R | 2R | A | Q1 | 1R | 1R | 3R | 2R | 1R | A | A | A | 1R | 0 / 9 | 5–9 | 36% |
| French Open | A | Q1 | 1R | Q1 | 3R | QF | 1R | QF | 2R | 2R | 1R | 1R | 1R | A | A | A | A | 0 / 10 | 12–10 | 55% |
| Wimbledon | A | 1R | 1R | Q2 | 2R | 2R | 1R | 4R | 2R | 4R | 1R | QF | A | A | A | NH | A | 0 / 10 | 13–10 | 57% |
| US Open | A | Q3 | 1R | 1R | 3R | 1R | Q1 | 2R | 3R | 1R | Q3 | 4R | A | A | A | A | 1R | 0 / 9 | 8–9 | 47% |
| Win–loss | 0–0 | 0–1 | 0–3 | 1–2 | 5–4 | 6–4 | 0–2 | 8–3 | 4–4 | 4–4 | 2–3 | 8–4 | 0–2 | 0–0 | 0–0 | 0–0 | 0–2 | 0 / 38 | 38–38 | 50% |
WTA 1000
| Dubai / Qatar Open (Note: The first Premier 5 event of the year has switched back and forth between the Dubai Tennis Championships and the Qatar Ladies Open since 2009. Dubai was classified as a Premier 5 event from 2009 to 2011 before being succeeded by Doha for the 2012–2014 period. In 2015, Dubai regained its Premier 5 status while Doha was demoted to Premier status. The Premier 5 tournaments were reclassified as WTA 1000 tournaments in 2021.) | NT1 | | | 2R | A | 1R | 1R | A | A | A | A | 1R | 1R | A | A | 1R | 1R | 0 / 7 | 1–7 | 13% |
| Indian Wells Open | A | A | Q1 | 1R | 2R | 1R | 1R | A | 2R | 3R | A | 3R | 1R | A | A | NH | A | 0 / 8 | 5–8 | 38% |
| Miami Open | A | A | 3R | 1R | A | 4R | 2R | A | 1R | 2R | 1R | Q2 | 2R | A | A | NH | 1R | 0 / 9 | 8–9 | 47% |
| Madrid Open | NH | | | | A | 1R | 1R | A | 3R | Q1 | Q1 | Q1 | 1R | A | A | NH | 1R | 0 / 5 | 2–4 | 33% |
| Italian Open | A | A | A | Q1 | 2R | 2R | 1R | A | A | A | A | Q1 | 1R | A | A | A | 2R | 0 / 5 | 3–5 | 38% |
| Canadian Open | A | A | A | A | 2R | 2R | A | A | A | A | Q2 | A | A | A | A | NH | A | 0 / 2 | 2–2 | 50% |
| Cincinnati Open | NT1 | | | | 1R | 2R | A | 2R | A | Q1 | 2R | Q1 | A | A | A | A | Q1 | 0 / 4 | 3–4 | 43% |
| Pan Pacific / Wuhan Open (Note: In 2014, the Pan Pacific Open was downgraded to a Premier event and replaced by the Wuhan Open. The Premier 5 tournaments were reclassified as WTA 1000 tournaments in 2021.) | A | A | A | Q1 | A | 2R | A | 1R | A | A | A | 3R | A | A | A | NH | | 0 / 3 | 3–3 | 50% |
| China Open | NT1 | | | | 1R | 1R | A | 2R | Q2 | 1R | Q2 | QF | A | A | A | NH | | 0 / 5 | 4–5 | 44% |
Career statistics
| | 2005 | 2006 | 2007 | 2008 | 2009 | 2010 | 2011 | 2012 | 2013 | 2014 | 2015 | 2016 | 2017 | 2018 | 2019 | 2020 | 2021 | Career | | |
| Tournaments | 1 | 2 | 15 | 13 | 17 | 22 | 13 | 13 | 15 | 15 | 14 | 17 | 10 | 0 | 0 | 1 | 10 | Career total: 178 | | |
| Titles | 0 | 0 | 1 | 0 | 0 | 0 | 0 | 0 | 0 | 0 | 0 | 0 | 0 | 0 | 0 | 0 | 0 | Career total: 1 | | |
| Finals | 0 | 0 | 1 | 0 | 0 | 0 | 0 | 0 | 0 | 0 | 1 | 0 | 0 | 0 | 0 | 0 | 0 | Career total: 2 | | |
| Hard win–loss | 1–1 | 1–1 | 8–9 | 4–12 | 8–10 | 12–14 | 3–6 | 5–8 | 4–10 | 6–7 | 6–8 | 12–10 | 1–5 | 0–0 | 0–0 | 0–1 | 0–7 | 1 / 110 | 71–109 | 39% |
| Clay win–loss | 0–0 | 0–0 | 1–3 | 0–0 | 8–4 | 8–5 | 2–5 | 8–3 | 5–3 | 5–6 | 5–4 | 1–4 | 3–5 | 0–0 | 0–0 | 0–0 | 1–3 | 0 / 46 | 47–45 | 51% |
| Grass win–loss | 0–0 | 0–1 | 1–2 | 2–1 | 2–3 | 3–3 | 1–2 | 4–2 | 1–0 | 5–2 | 2–2 | 4–3 | 0–0 | 0–0 | 0–0 | 0–0 | 0–0 | 0 / 22 | 25–21 | 54% |
| Overall win–loss | 1–1 | 1–2 | 10–14 | 6–13 | 18–17 | 23–22 | 6–13 | 17–13 | 10–13 | 16–15 | 13–14 | 17–17 | 4–10 | 0–0 | 0–0 | 0–1 | 1–10 | 1 / 178 | 143–175 | 45% |
| Win% | 50% | 33% | 42% | 32% | 51% | 51% | 32% | 57% | 43% | 52% | 48% | 50% | 29% | – | – | 0% | 9% | Career total: 45% | | |
| Year-end ranking | 315 | 132 | 89 | 91 | 53 | 39 | 206 | 29 | 81 | 66 | 82 | 33 | 292 | – | – | – | 433 | $6,451,455 | | |

=== Doubles ===
| | Russia | | Kazakhstan | | | | | | | | | | | | | | | |
| Tournament | 2006 | 2007 | 2008 | 2009 | 2010 | 2011 | 2012 | 2013 | 2014 | 2015 | 2016 | 2017 | ... | 2020 | 2021 | SR | W–L | Win% |
Grand Slam tournaments
| Australian Open | A | A | 1R | 1R | 1R | A | QF | 1R | 2R | 2R | 2R | 3R | | A | 1R | 0 / 10 | 8–10 | 44% |
| French Open | A | 1R | 1R | 1R | 1R | SF | QF | 2R | 1R | F | 3R | 1R | | A | A | 0 / 11 | 15–11 | 58% |
| Wimbledon | A | A | 2R | 2R | W | 2R | 3R | A | 3R | QF | F | A | | NH | A | 1 / 8 | 21–7 | 75% |
| US Open | A | QF | 1R | 2R | W | F | 3R | 1R | 2R | F | 3R | A | | A | 1R | 1 / 11 | 24–10 | 71% |
| Win–loss | 0–0 | 2–2 | 1–4 | 2–4 | 12–2 | 10–3 | 10–4 | 1–3 | 4–4 | 14–4 | 10–4 | 2–2 | | 0–0 | 0–2 | 2 / 40 | 68–38 | 64% |
Year-end championships
| WTA Finals | DNQ | | | | SF | SF | DNQ | | | | QF | DNQ | | NH | DNQ | 0 / 3 | 0–3 | 0% |
WTA 1000
| Dubai / Qatar Open | NT1 | | 2R | A | 1R | 1R | A | A | A | A | QF | SF | | 1R | 1R | 0 / 7 | 5–7 | 42% |
| Indian Wells Open | A | A | A | 1R | 1R | QF | A | 2R | 2R | A | SF | 2R | | NH | A | 0 / 7 | 8–7 | 53% |
| Miami Open | A | A | 2R | 2R | 1R | 1R | 2R | QF | QF | A | F | QF | | NH | 1R | 0 / 10 | 13–10 | 57% |
| Madrid Open | NH | | | A | 2R | SF | QF | 1R | SF | W | QF | QF | | NH | 1R | 1 / 9 | 15–8 | 65% |
| Italian Open | A | A | 1R | SF | QF | F | A | A | SF | 2R | QF | SF | | A | 1R | 0 / 9 | 13–9 | 59% |
| Canadian Open | A | A | A | 2R | 2R | A | A | A | 1R | 1R | A | A | | NH | A | 0 / 5 | 1–5 | 17% |
| Cincinnati Open | NT1 | | | 2R | 2R | W | A | A | QF | F | QF | A | | A | 1R | 1 / 5 | 12–5 | 71% |
| Pan Pacific / Wuhan Open | A | A | QF | A | 1R | SF | 1R | A | A | A | QF | A | | NH | | 0 / 5 | 5–5 | 50% |
| China Open | NT1 | | | 1R | SF | SF | 2R | 1R | 1R | SF | 2R | A | | NH | | 0 / 8 | 6–8 | 43% |
Career statistics
| Tournaments | 2 | 4 | 19 | 21 | 21 | 17 | 13 | 15 | 17 | 13 | 20 | 10 | | 2 | 11 | Career total: 175 | | |
| Titles | 0 | 0 | 0 | 1 | 2 | 3 | 0 | 2 | 2 | 2 | 1 | 0 | | 0 | 0 | Career total: 13 | | |
| Finals | 0 | 0 | 1 | 1 | 4 | 6 | 2 | 3 | 2 | 5 | 3 | 1 | | 0 | 0 | Career total: 28 | | |
| Overall win–loss | 2–1 | 5–4 | 18–18 | 16–20 | 27–19 | 37–13 | 19–13 | 16–12 | 26–15 | 32–11 | 35–19 | 14–10 | | 0–2 | 1–11 | 13 / 175 | 238–169 | 58% |
| Year-end ranking | 242 | 111 | 42 | 49 | 7 | 5 | 26 | 59 | 24 | 6 | 14 | 37 | | – | 827 | | | |

=== Mixed doubles ===
| | Kazakhstan | | | | | | | | | | | | | | |
| Tournament | 2009 | 2010 | 2011 | 2012 | 2013 | 2014 | 2015 | 2016 | 2017 | 2018 | 2019 | 2020 | 2021 | W–L | Win% |
| Australian Open | A | A | A | 2R | SF | A | 1R | 2R | A | A | A | A | 1R | 5–5 | 50% |
| French Open | 1R | F | A | 1R | A | SF | 1R | 2R | 2R | A | A | NH | A | 9–7 | 56% |
| Wimbledon | 2R | QF | 2R | 3R | A | A | A | SF | A | A | A | NH | A | 9–5 | 64% |
| US Open | A | 2R | 1R | A | A | A | QF | QF | A | A | A | NH | QF | 7–5 | 58% |

== Grand Slam tournament finals ==
=== Doubles: 6 (2 titles, 4 runner-ups) ===
| Result | Year | Championship | Surface | Partner | Opponents | Score |
|---|---|---|---|---|---|---|
| Win | 2010 | Wimbledon | Grass | (United States) Vania King | (Russia) Elena Vesnina (Russia) Vera Zvonareva | 7–6^{(8–6)}, 6–2 |
| Win | 2010 | US Open | Hard | (United States) Vania King | (United States) Liezel Huber (Russia) Nadia Petrova | 2–6, 6–4, 7–6^{(7–4)} |
| Loss | 2011 | US Open | Hard | (United States) Vania King | (United States) Liezel Huber (United States) Lisa Raymond | 6–4, 6–7^{(5–7)}, 6–7^{(3–7)} |
| Loss | 2015 | French Open | Clay | (Australia) Casey Dellacqua | (United States) Bethanie Mattek-Sands (Czech Republic) Lucie Šafářová | 6–3, 4–6, 2–6 |
| Loss | 2015 | US Open | Hard | (Australia) Casey Dellacqua | (Switzerland) Martina Hingis (India) Sania Mirza | 3–6, 3–6 |
| Loss | 2016 | Wimbledon | Grass | (Hungary) Tímea Babos | (United States) Serena Williams (United States) Venus Williams | 4–6, 3–6 |

=== Mixed doubles: 1 (runner-up) ===
| Result | Year | Championship | Surface | Partner | Opponents | Score |
|---|---|---|---|---|---|---|
| Loss | 2010 | French Open | Clay | (Austria) Julian Knowle | (Slovenia) Katarina Srebotnik (Serbia) Nenad Zimonjić | 6–4, 6–7^{(5–7)}, [9–11] |

== Other significant finals ==
=== Premier Mandatory/Premier 5 tournaments ===
==== Doubles: 5 (2 titles, 3 runner-ups) ====
| Result | Year | Tournament | Surface | Partner | Opponents | Score |
|---|---|---|---|---|---|---|
| Loss | 2011 | Italian Open | Clay | (United States) Vania King | (China) Peng Shuai (China) Zheng Jie | 2–6, 3–6 |
| Win | 2011 | Cincinnati Open | Hard | (United States) Vania King | (South Africa) Natalie Grandin (Czech Republic) Vladimíra Uhlířová | 6–4, 3–6, [11–9] |
| Win | 2015 | Madrid Open | Clay | (Australia) Casey Dellacqua | (Spain) Garbiñe Muguruza (Spain) Carla Suárez Navarro | 6–3, 6–7^{(4–7)}, [10–5] |
| Loss | 2015 | Cincinnati Open | Hard | (Australia) Casey Dellacqua | (Chinese Taipei) Chan Hao-ching (Chinese Taipei) Chan Yung-jan | 5–7, 4–6 |
| Loss | 2016 | Miami Open | Hard | (Hungary) Tímea Babos | (United States) Bethanie Mattek-Sands (Czech Republic) Lucie Šafářová | 3–6, 4–6 |

== WTA Tour finals ==
=== Singles: 2 (1 title, 1 runner-up) ===
| Legend WTA 500 Tier III / International (1–1) | Finals by surface Hard (1–0) Clay (0–1) |

| Result | W–L | Date | Tournament | Tier | Surface | Opponent | Score |
|---|---|---|---|---|---|---|---|
| Win | 1–0 | Feb 2007 | Bangalore Open, India | Tier III | Hard | (Italy) Mara Santangelo | 6–4, 6–4 |
| Loss | 1–1 | Apr 2015 | Copa Colsanitas, Colombia | International | Clay | (Brazil) Teliana Pereira | 6–7^{(2–7)}, 1–6 |

=== Doubles: 28 (13 titles, 15 runner-ups) ===
| Legend Grand Slam tournaments (2–4) Premier 5 & M / WTA 1000 (2–3) Premier / WTA 500 (2–2) Tier III / International (7–6) | Finals by surface Hard (9–9) Grass (2–2) Clay (2–4) |

| Result | W–L | Date | Tournament | Tier | Surface | Partner | Opponents | Score |
|---|---|---|---|---|---|---|---|---|
| Loss | 0–1 | Sep 2008 | Cincinnati Open, United States | Tier III | Hard | (Chinese Taipei) Hsieh Su-wei | (Russia) Maria Kirilenko (Russia) Nadia Petrova | 3–6, 6–4, [8–10] |
| Win | 1–1 | Feb 2009 | Pattaya Open, Thailand | International | Hard | (Thailand) Tamarine Tanasugarn | (Ukraine) Yuliya Beygelzimer (Russia) Vitalia Diatchenko | 6–3, 6–2 |
| Loss | 1–2 | Apr 2010 | Andalucia Experience, Spain | International | Clay | (Russia) Maria Kondratieva | (Italy) Sara Errani (Italy) Roberta Vinci | 4–6, 2–6 |
| Loss | 1–3 | Jun 2010 | Rosmalen Open, Netherlands | International | Grass | (United States) Vania King | (Russia) Alla Kudryavtseva (Australia) Anastasia Rodionova | 6–3, 3–6, [6–10] |
| Win | 2–3 | Jul 2010 | Wimbledon, UK | Grand Slam | Grass | (United States) Vania King | (Russia) Elena Vesnina (Russia) Vera Zvonareva | 7–6^{(8–6)}, 6–2 |
| Win | 3–3 | Sep 2010 | US Open, United States | Grand Slam | Hard | (United States) Vania King | (United States) Liezel Huber (Russia) Nadia Petrova | 2–6, 6–4, 7–6^{(7–4)} |
| Loss | 3–4 | May 2011 | Italian Open, Italy | Premier 5 | Clay | (United States) Vania King | (China) Peng Shuai (China) Zheng Jie | 2–6, 3–6 |
| Win | 4–4 | Jul 2011 | Washington Open, United States | International | Hard | (India) Sania Mirza | (Belarus) Olga Govortsova (Russia) Alla Kudryavtseva | 6–3, 6–3 |
| Win | 5–4 | Aug 2011 | Cincinnati Open, United States | Premier 5 | Hard | (United States) Vania King | (South Africa) Natalie Grandin (Czech Republic) Vladimíra Uhlířová | 6–4, 3–6, [11–9] |
| Loss | 5–5 | Sep 2011 | US Open, United States | Grand Slam | Hard | (United States) Vania King | (United States) Liezel Huber (United States) Lisa Raymond | 6–4, 6–7^{(5–7)}, 6–7^{(3–7)} |
| Loss | 5–6 | Oct 2011 | Japan Women's Open | International | Hard | (United States) Vania King | (Japan) Kimiko Date-Krumm (China) Zhang Shuai | 5–7, 6–3, [9–11] |
| Win | 6–6 | Oct 2011 | Kremlin Cup, Russia | Premier | Hard (i) | (United States) Vania King | (Australia) Anastasia Rodionova (Kazakhstan) Galina Voskoboeva | 7–6^{(7–3)}, 6–3 |
| Loss | 6–7 | Apr 2012 | Charleston Open, United States | Premier | Clay (green) | (Spain) Anabel Medina Garrigues | (Russia) Anastasia Pavlyuchenkova (Czech Republic) Lucie Šafářová | 7–5, 4–6, [6–10] |
| Loss | 6–8 | May 2012 | Estoril Open, Portugal | International | Clay | (Kazakhstan) Galina Voskoboeva | (Chinese Taipei) Chuang Chia-jung (China) Zhang Shuai | 6–4, 1–6, [9–11] |
| Loss | 6–9 | Jan 2013 | Auckland Open, New Zealand | International | Hard | (Germany) Julia Görges | (Zimbabwe) Cara Black (Australia) Anastasia Rodionova | 6–2, 2–6, [5–10] |
| Win | 7–9 | Mar 2013 | Brasil Tennis Cup, Brazil | International | Hard | (Spain) Anabel Medina Garrigues | (United Kingdom) Anne Keothavong (Russia) Valeria Savinykh | 6–0, 6–4 |
| Win | 8–9 | Sep 2013 | Tashkent Open, Uzbekistan | International | Hard | (Hungary) Tímea Babos | (Luxembourg) Mandy Minella (Belarus) Olga Govortsova | 6–3, 6–3 |
| Win | 9–9 | Feb 2014 | Brasil Tennis Cup | International | Hard | (Spain) Anabel Medina Garrigues | (Italy) Francesca Schiavone (Spain) Sílvia Soler Espinosa | 7–6^{(7–1)}, 2–6, [10–3] |
| Win | 10–9 | Apr 2014 | Charleston Open, United States | Premier | Clay | (Spain) Anabel Medina Garrigues | (Chinese Taipei) Chan Hao-ching (Chinese Taipei) Chan Yung-jan | 7–6^{(7–4)}, 6–2 |
| Win | 11–9 | May 2015 | Madrid Open, Spain | Premier M | Clay | (Australia) Casey Dellacqua | (Spain) Garbiñe Muguruza (Spain) Carla Suárez Navarro | 6–3, 6–7^{(4–7)}, [10–5] |
| Loss | 11–10 | Jun 2015 | French Open, France | Grand Slam | Clay | (Australia) Casey Dellacqua | (United States) Bethanie Mattek-Sands (Czech Republic) Lucie Šafářová | 6–3, 4–6, 2–6 |
| Loss | 11–11 | Aug 2015 | Cincinnati Open, United States | Premier 5 | Hard | (Australia) Casey Dellacqua | (Chinese Taipei) Chan Hao-ching (Chinese Taipei) Chan Yung-jan | 5–7, 4–6 |
| Loss | 11–12 | Sep 2015 | US Open, United States | Grand Slam | Hard | (Australia) Casey Dellacqua | (Switzerland) Martina Hingis (India) Sania Mirza | 3–6, 3–6 |
| Win | 12–12 | Oct 2015 | Hong Kong Open, China | International | Hard | (France) Alizé Cornet | (Spain) Lara Arruabarrena (Slovenia) Andreja Klepač | 7–5, 6–4 |
| Loss | 12–13 | Apr 2016 | Miami Open, United States | Premier M | Hard | (Hungary) Tímea Babos | (United States) Bethanie Mattek-Sands (Czech Republic) Lucie Šafářová | 3–6, 4–6 |
| Win | 13–13 | Jun 2016 | Rosmalen Open, Netherlands | International | Grass | (Georgia (country)) Oksana Kalashnikova | (Switzerland) Xenia Knoll (Serbia) Aleksandra Krunić | 6–1, 6–1 |
| Loss | 13–14 | Jul 2016 | Wimbledon, UK | Grand Slam | Grass | (Hungary) Tímea Babos | (United States) Serena Williams (United States) Venus Williams | 3–6, 4–6 |
| Loss | 13–15 | Feb 2017 | Qatar Ladies Open | Premier | Hard | (Ukraine) Olga Savchuk | (United States) Abigail Spears (Slovenia) Katarina Srebotnik | 3–6, 6–7^{(7–9)} |

== WTA 125 finals ==
=== Singles: 1 (title) ===
| Result | Date | Tournament | Surface | Opponent | Score |
|---|---|---|---|---|---|
| Win | Nov 2015 | Hua Hin Challenger, Thailand | Hard | (Japan) Naomi Osaka | 6–4, 6–7^{(8–10)}, 6–4 |

=== Doubles: 2 (1 title, 1 runner-up) ===
| Result | W–L | Date | Tournament | Surface | Partner | Opponents | Score |
|---|---|---|---|---|---|---|---|
| Loss | 0–1 | Nov 2013 | Nanjing Ladies Open, China | Hard | (China) Zhang Shuai | (Japan) Misaki Doi; (China) Xu Yifan | 1–6, 4–6 |
| Win | 1–1 | Nov 2013 | Taipei Ladies Open, Taiwan | Carpet (i) | (France) Caroline Garcia | (Germany) Anna-Lena Friedsam; (Belgium) Alison Van Uytvanck | 6–3, 6–3 |

== ITF Circuit finals ==
=== Singles: 7 (4 titles, 3 runner-ups) ===
Legend
$100,000 tournaments (1–0)
$75,000 tournaments (0–1)
$25,000 tournaments (1–2)
$10,000 tournaments (2–0)

| Result | W–L | Date | Tournament | Tier | Surface | Opponent | Score |
|---|---|---|---|---|---|---|---|
| Win | 1–0 | Jun 2005 | ITF Warsaw, Poland | 10,000 | Clay | (Slovakia) Dominika Nociarová | 6–2, 7–6^{(6)} |
| Loss | 1–1 | Oct 2005 | ITF Bolton, UK | 25,000 | Hard (i) | (Czech Republic) Sandra Kleinová | 6–0, 3–6, 3–6 |
| Win | 2–1 | Mar 2006 | ITF Amiens, France | 10,000 | Hard (i) | (France) Julie Coin | 2–6, 7–5, 6–4 |
| Loss | 2–2 | Apr 2006 | ITF Dinan, France | 75,000 | Hard (i) | (Switzerland) Timea Bacsinszky | 6–4, 5–7, 2–6 |
| Win | 3–2 | Aug 2008 | ITF Monterrey, Mexico | 100,000 | Hard | (Slovakia) Magdaléna Rybáriková | 6–4, 6–1 |
| Loss | 3–3 | Mar 2012 | ITF Irapuato, Mexico | 25,000 | Hard | (Netherlands) Kiki Bertens | 4–6, 6–2, 1–6 |
| Win | 4–3 | Mar 2012 | ITF Poza Rica, Mexico | 25,000 | Hard | (Puerto Rico) Monica Puig | 6–1, 6–2 |

=== Doubles: 4 (3 titles, 1 runner-up) ===
Legend
$100,000 tournaments (1–0)
$25,000 tournaments (1–1)
$10,000 tournaments (1–0)

| Result | W–L | Date | Tournament | Tier | Surface | Partner | Opponents | Score |
|---|---|---|---|---|---|---|---|---|
| Loss | 0–1 | Jul 2005 | ITF Darmstadt, Germany | 25,000 | Clay | (Russia) Vasilisa Bardina | (Germany) Vanessa Henke; (Germany) Laura Siegemund | 4–6, 2–6 |
| Win | 1–1 | Mar 2006 | ITF Amiens, France | 10,000 | Clay (i) | (Russia) Olga Panova | (France) Julie Coin (France) Karla Mraz | 6–4, 6–1 |
| Win | 2–1 | Apr 2006 | Open de Biarritz, France | 25,000 | Clay | (Russia) Nina Bratchikova | (Poland) Klaudia Jans (Poland) Alicja Rosolska | 6–3, 6–2 |
| Win | 3–1 | Oct 2008 | ITF Ortisei, Italy | 100,000 | Carpet | (Ukraine) Mariya Koryttseva | (Estonia) Maret Ani (Kazakhstan) Galina Voskoboeva | 6–2, 6–1 |

== Records ==
| Tournament | Year | Record accomplished | Player tied |
|---|---|---|---|
| Wimbledon | 2012 | Achieved a Golden Set | Pauline Betz (1943) Tine Scheuer-Larsen (1995) |

== Best Grand Slam results details ==
=== Singles ===
| | Australian Open | | | |
2015 Australian Open
| Round | Opponent | Rank | Score | YSR |
|---|---|---|---|---|
| 1R | (Czech Republic) Lucie Šafářová (16) | No. 16 | 6–4, 2–6, 8–6 | No. 66 |
| 2R | (Puerto Rico) Monica Puig | No. 60 | 6–2, 7–6^{(8–6)} | No. 66 |
| 3R | (China) Peng Shuai (21) | No. 22 | 6–7^{(7–9)}, 3–6 | No. 66 |

| | French Open | | | |
2010 French Open
| Round | Opponent | Rank | Score | YSR |
|---|---|---|---|---|
| 1R | (Italy) Sara Errani | No. 33 | 6–1, 7–5 | No. 36 |
| 2R | (Poland) Agnieszka Radwańska (8) | No. 8 | 7–5, 6–3 | No. 36 |
| 3R | (Russia) Alisa Kleybanova (28) | No. 28 | 6–2, 4–6, 6–0 | No. 36 |
| 4R | (Australia) Jarmila Groth (WC) | No. 107 | 6–4, 6–3 | No. 36 |
| QF | (Serbia) Jelena Janković (4) | No. 4 | 5–7, 4–6 | No. 36 |
2012 French Open (qualifier)
| Round | Opponent | Rank | Score | YSR |
| Q1 | (Croatia) Ajla Tomljanović | No. 198 | 6–4, 6–4 | No. 142 |
| Q2 | (United States) CoCo Vandeweghe | No. 156 | 6–1, 6–2 | No. 142 |
| Q3 | (Romania) Elena Bogdan | No. 200 | 6–1, 6–1 | No. 142 |
| 1R | (Luxembourg) Mandy Minella | No. 87 | 6–3, 6–4 | No. 142 |
| 2R | (Sweden) Sofia Arvidsson | No. 54 | 6–1, 6–0 | No. 142 |
| 3R | (Spain) Carla Suárez Navarro | No. 46 | 6–4, 7–5 | No. 142 |
| 4R | (China) Li Na (7) | No. 7 | 3–6, 6–2, 6–0 | No. 142 |
| QF | (Czech Republic) Petra Kvitová (4) | No. 4 | 6–3, 2–6, 4–6 | No. 142 |

| | Wimbledon Championships | | | |
2016 Wimbledon
| Round | Opponent | Rank | Score | YSR |
|---|---|---|---|---|
| 1R | (Germany) Julia Görges | No. 78 | 7–5, 6–4 | No. 96 |
| 2R | (Ukraine) Elina Svitolina (17) | No. 20 | 6–2, 3–6, 6–4 | No. 96 |
| 3R | (Germany) Sabine Lisicki | No. 81 | 7–6^{(7–2)}, 6–1 | No. 96 |
| 4R | (Czech Republic) Lucie Šafářová (28) | No. 29 | 6–2, 6–4 | No. 96 |
| QF | (United States) Venus Williams (8) | No. 8 | 6–7^{(5–7)}, 2–6 | No. 96 |

| | US Open | | | |
2016 US Open
| Round | Opponent | Rank | Score | YSR |
|---|---|---|---|---|
| 1R | (Spain) Lara Arruabarrena | No. 91 | 6–2, 6–3 | No. 52 |
| 2R | (China) Wang Qiang | No. 62 | 6–0, 6–1 | No. 52 |
| 3R | (China) Zhang Shuai | No. 51 | 6–2, 7–5 | No. 52 |
| 4R | (United States) Serena Williams (1) | No. 1 | 2–6, 3–6 | No. 52 |

=== Doubles ===
| | Australian Open | | | |
2012 Australian Open
with (United States) Vania King (3rd seed)
| Round | Opponents | Rank | Score | YSR |
|---|---|---|---|---|
| 1R | (Germany) Kristina Barrois (Germany) Anna-Lena Grönefeld | No. 63; No. 53 | 1–6, 6–3, 6–1 | No. 5 |
| 2R | (Australia) Sacha Jones (WC) (Australia) Bojana Bobusic (WC) | No. 958; No. 386 | 6–1, 6–0 | No. 5 |
| 3R | (Croatia) Petra Martić (France) Kristina Mladenovic | No. 114; No. 83 | 6–2, 2–6, 6–2 | No. 5 |
| QF | (Czech Republic) Andrea Hlaváčková (7) (Czech Republic) Lucie Hradecká (7) | No. 14; No. 15 | 5–7, 2–6 | No. 5 |

| | French Open | | | |
2015 French Open
with (Australia) Casey Dellacqua (12th seed)
| Round | Opponents | Rank | Score | YSR |
|---|---|---|---|---|
| 1R | (Chinese Taipei) Chan Chin-wei (United States) Lauren Davis | No. 76; No. 264 | 6–1, 6–2 | No. 34 |
| 2R | (France) Alizé Cornet (Poland) Magda Linette | No. 137; No. 120 | 6–2, 6–1 | No. 34 |
| 3R | (France) Caroline Garcia (8) (Slovenia) Katarina Srebotnik (8) | No. 23; No. 20 | 6–1, 6–1 | No. 34 |
| QF | (Netherlands) Michaëlla Krajicek (13) (Czech Republic) Barbora Strýcová (13) | No. 26; No. 31 | 6–3, 7–5 | No. 34 |
| SF | (Russia) Ekaterina Makarova (2) (Russia) Elena Vesnina (2) | No. 7 No. 7 | 6–3, 6–2 | No. 34 |
| F | (United States) Bethanie Mattek-Sands (7) (Czech Republic) Lucie Šafářová (7) | No. 19; No. 18 | 6–3, 4–6, 2–6 | No. 34 |

| | Wimbledon Championships | | | |
2010 Wimbledon
with (United States) Vania King
| Round | Opponents | Rank | Score | YSR |
|---|---|---|---|---|
| 1R | (Italy) Alberta Brianti (Romania) Alexandra Dulgheru | No. 220; No. 120 | 6–1, 6–2 | No. 49 |
| 2R | (Romania) Monica Niculescu (7) (Israel) Shahar Pe'er (7) | No. 26; No. 37 | 6–0, 3–6, 6–2 | No. 49 |
| 3R | (Russia) Nadia Petrova (3) (Australia) Samantha Stosur (3) | No. 11; No. 8 | 6–4, 6–4 | No. 49 |
| QF | (Czech Republic) Květa Peschke (6) (Slovenia) Katarina Srebotnik (6) | No. 13; No. 12 | 3–6, 7–5, 6–3 | No. 49 |
| SF | (United States) Liezel Huber (5) (United States) Bethanie Mattek-Sands (5) | No. 3 No. 21 | 6–4, 6–2 | No. 49 |
| F | (Russia) Elena Vesnina (Russia) Vera Zvonareva | No. 41; No. 193 | 7–6^{(8–6)}, 6–2 | No. 49 |

| | US Open | | | |
2010 US Open
with (United States) Vania King (6th seed)
| Round | Opponents | Rank | Score | YSR |
|---|---|---|---|---|
| 1R | (Croatia) Jelena Kostanić Tošić (Italy) Romina Oprandi | No. 1,001; No. 211 | 6–3, 6–0 | No. 21 |
| 2R | (Australia) Jarmila Groth (Czech Republic) Klára Zakopalová | No. 328; No. 87 | 7–5, 4–6, 6–2 | No. 21 |
| 3R | (Czech Republic) Iveta Benešová (12) (Czech Republic) Barbora Záhlavová-Strýcová (12) | No. 28; No. 26 | 7–6^{(11–9)}, 3–6, 7–6^{(11–9)} | No. 21 |
| QF | (Argentina) Gisela Dulko (1) (Italy) Flavia Pennetta (1) | No. 4 No. 5 | 6–3, 6–3 | No. 21 |
| SF | (Zimbabwe) Cara Black (9) (Australia) Anastasia Rodionova (9) | No. 6 No. 39 | 6–3, 4–6, 6–4 | No. 21 |
| F | (United States) Liezel Huber (2) (Russia) Nadia Petrova (2) | No. 1 No. 12 | 2–6, 6–4, 7–6^{(7–4)} | No. 21 |

=== Mixed doubles ===
| | Australian Open | |
2013 Australian Open
with (Uzbekistan) Denis Istomin
| Round | Opponents | Score |
|---|---|---|
| 1R | (United States) Vania King (Brazil) Marcelo Melo | 2–6, 6–4, [10–7] |
| 2R | (China) Yan Zi (Alt) (Mexico) Santiago González (Alt) | 6–2, 6–1 |
| QF | (Spain) Nuria Llagostera Vives (Spain) David Marrero | 6–4, 7–5 |
| SF | (Australia) Jarmila Gajdošová (WC) (Australia) Matthew Ebden (WC) | 5–7, 6–7^{(5–7)} |

| | French Open | |
2010 French Open
with (Austria) Julian Knowle
| Round | Opponents | Score |
|---|---|---|
| 1R | (China) Yan Zi (8) (Poland) Mariusz Fyrstenberg (8) | 6–4, 6–4 |
| 2R | (Czech Republic) Barbora Záhlavová-Strýcová (Czech Republic) František Čermák | 6–3, 6–3 |
| QF | (Zimbabwe) Cara Black (2) (India) Leander Paes (2) | 6–3, 6–7^{(2–7)}, [10–7] |
| SF | (United States) Vania King (Germany) Christopher Kas | 6–4, 6–4 |
| F | (Slovenia) Katarina Srebotnik (6) (Serbia) Nenad Zimonjić (6) | 6–4, 6–7^{(5–7)}, [9–11] |

| | Wimbledon Championships | |
2016 Wimbledon
with (Pakistan) Aisam-ul-Haq Qureshi (14th seed)
| Round | Opponents | Score |
|---|---|---|
| 1R | bye | |
| 2R | (China) Zhang Shuai (Austria) Julian Knowle | 6–3, 7–6^{(7–4)} |
| 3R | (United Kingdom) Anna Smith (WC) (United Kingdom) Neal Skupski (WC) | 6–3, 6–4 |
| QF | (Slovenia) Katarina Srebotnik (11) (Poland) Marcin Matkowski (11) | 6–3, 3–6, 7–5 |
| SF | (Germany) Anna-Lena Grönefeld (15) (Colombia) Robert Farah (15) | 4–6, 6–2, 5–7 |

| | US Open | |
2015 US Open
with (Colombia) Juan Sebastián Cabal (6th seed)
| Round | Opponents | Score |
|---|---|---|
| 1R | (Slovenia) Andreja Klepač (Colombia) Robert Farah | 6–2, 6–2 |
| 2R | (United States) Lisa Raymond (Alt) (United Kingdom) Jamie Murray (Alt) | 7–5, 2–6, [10–8] |
| QF | (United States) Bethanie Mattek-Sands (United States) Sam Querrey | 6–3, 4–6, [6–10] |
2016 US Open
with (Brazil) Bruno Soares (2nd seed)
| Round | Opponents | Score |
| 1R | (China) Xu Yifan (Pakistan) Aisam-ul-Haq Qureshi | 6–4, 3–6, [10–8] |
| 2R | (Hungary) Tímea Babos (United States) Eric Butorac | 6–3, 7–5 |
| QF | (Chinese Taipei) Chan Yung-jan (Serbia) Nenad Zimonjić | 6–1, 3–6, [11–13] |
2021 US Open
with (France) Fabrice Martin (Protected ranking)
| Round | Opponents | Score |
| 1R | (Chinese Taipei) Chan Hao-ching (7) (New Zealand) Michael Venus (7) | 6–4, 3–6, [10–7] |
| 2R | (United States) Sachia Vickery (WC) (United States) Nathan Pasha (WC) | 6–4, 4–6, [11–9] |
| QF | (Ukraine) Dayana Yastremska (Alt) (Australia) Max Purcell (Alt) | 2–6, 3–6 |

== Top-10 wins ==
| # | Player | Rank | Event | Surface | Rd | Score |
|---|---|---|---|---|---|---|
2009
| 1. | (Serbia) Jelena Janković | No. 5 | US Open | Hard | 2R | 6–3, 6–7^{(4)}, 7–6^{(6)} |
2010
| 2. | (Poland) Agnieszka Radwańska | No. 8 | French Open | Clay | 2R | 7–5, 6–3 |
2012
| 3. | (China) Li Na | No. 7 | French Open | Clay | 4R | 3–6, 6–2, 6–0 |
| 4. | (Italy) Sara Errani | No. 8 | Wimbledon | Grass | 3R | 6–0, 6–4 |
2013
| 5. | (Denmark) Caroline Wozniacki | No. 10 | Madrid Open | Clay | 1R | 6–2, 6–4 |
2014
| 6. | (Slovakia) Dominika Cibulková | No. 10 | Rosmalen Open | Grass | 1R | 6–2, 3–6, 6–3 |
2015
| 7. | (Spain) Garbiñe Muguruza | No. 8 | Cincinnati Open | Hard | 1R | 6–4, 7–6^{(0)} |

== Notes ==
Awards
| Preceded by (Germany) Sabine Lisicki | WTA Comeback Player of the Year; 2012 | Succeeded by (Russia) Alisa Kleybanova |
