= Olga Puchkova =

Russian tennis player (born 1987)

Olga Puchkova Ольга Пучкова
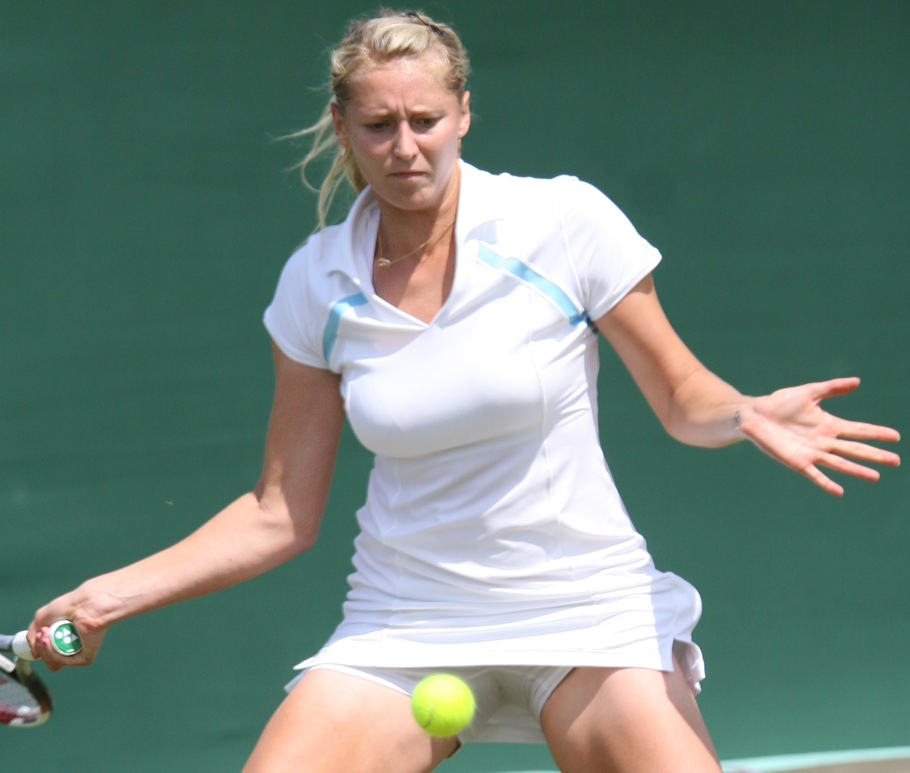
- Puchkova at the 2008 Wimbledon Championships
- Country (sports): Russia (2002–); Belarus (–2002)
- Residence: Miami Shores, Florida, U.S.
- Born: 27 September 1987 (age 38) Moscow, Russia
- Height: 1.80 m (5 ft 11 in)
- Turned pro: 2002
- Plays: Right-handed (two-handed backhand)
- Prize money: $846,870

Singles
- Career record: 374–320
- Career titles: 7 ITF
- Highest ranking: No. 32 (11 June 2007)

Grand Slam singles results
- Australian Open: 2R (2007, 2008)
- French Open: 2R (2007)
- Wimbledon: 2R (2013)
- US Open: 3R (2012)

Doubles
- Career record: 59–87
- Career titles: 0
- Highest ranking: No. 247 (13 August 2012)

Grand Slam doubles results
- Australian Open: 1R (2007, 2008)
- French Open: 1R (2007)
- Wimbledon: 1R (2007)
- US Open: 1R (2007)

Olga Alekseyevna Puchkova (also Poutchkova; Russian: Ольга Алексеевна Пучкова; Belarusian: Вольга Аляксееўна Пучкова; born 27 September 1987) is a Russian former professional tennis player. As a junior, she played for Belarus, and was sometimes listed as Belarusian professional.

== Career ==
=== Early years ===
Olga Puchkova, coached by her father Alex Poutchkov, was No. 1 in the world in the ITF U12 rankings in 1999. She won the U12 category in the Eddie Herr in 1999, where she beat Shahar Pe'er 6–2, 6–2 in the final, and a week later was runner up in the U12 category at the Orange Bowl, where qualifier Tatiana Golovin beat her 6–4, 3–6, 6–4.

Puchkova made her debut on the U18 circuit 13 August 2000 at the USTA Junior International Grass Court Championships where she was defeated in the first round. Just a week later, at the USTA Junior International Hard Court Championships she secured her first win in a U18 doubles match playing alongside Brazilian Caroline Neves. Alongside American Nicole Pitts, she won her first U18 tournament (out of two in doubles) in Ecuador, January 2001. She won her only U18 title in singles at the US Junior International Hard Court Championships in 2003, beating Jessi Robinson 6–2, 6–2 in the final.

=== ITF Circuit ===
Puchkova started her ITF Women's Circuit career in March 2002 when she played in four tournaments in Australia, reaching the quarterfinals at Warrnambool and Benalla. In 2003, she reached the final at Miami in January and the semifinal at Houston in June, and won her first professional tournament at Baltimore in July 2003 when she beat Jewel Peterson 6–2, 6–4 in the final. She won her second professional title 11 July 2004 in College Park, Maryland. She defeated top-seeded Maureen Drake in the second round and Rossana de los Ríos in the final. In Pelham, Alabama, she reached another final, but was defeated by Slovak Zuzana Zemenová in three sets. She reached her fifth ITF final in August 2005, beating Stéphanie Dubois en route. In the final, Ashley Harkleroad was too strong as she beat Puchkova to claim the Washington, D.C. title.

=== 2006: Breakthrough ===
In 2006, she made her WTA Tour main-draw debut in Hobart, Australia as a qualifier; however she lost in the first round to Mara Santangelo. Afterwards she tried to qualify for the 2006 Australian Open, but failed. She returned to the ITF Circuit and reached another final in Hammond, Louisiana at the end of March. She comfortably won the final, beating Andrea Hlaváčková for her third ITF title.

Her first WTA Tour main-draw win in Birmingham followed in June, beating fellow qualifier Viktoriya Kutuzova. She then lost her second-round match against fourth seed fellow Russian Elena Likhovtseva. Back in the ITF Circuit, she cruised to the final in Felixstowe's grass tournament, where she turned out to be way too strong for Australian Trudi Musgrave who was beaten in straight sets. As the second seed in the Bronx, New York, she won yet another ITF title. Top seed Melinda Czink was already beaten in the first round by Dutch Elise Tamaëla. Puchkova herself won all her matches and faced Belarusian Tatiana Poutchek in the final, which was easily won by Puchkova.

After failing to qualify for the Australian Open, Roland Garros and Wimbledon earlier in 2006, she qualified for the US Open, beating Virginie Pichet, Stéphanie Cohen-Aloro and Ryōko Fuda. She then faced Marion Bartoli in the first round and was not able to excel against the 26th seed (6–4, 6–0).

Puchkova reached her first tour final in Kolkata, India, in September 2006, losing to Martina Hingis but beating seventh seed Nicole Pratt en route. A week previously she had reached her first Tour singles quarterfinal at the Tier III Bali, Indonesia notching up her first top 20 victory along the way when beating Ana Ivanovic.

At the end of the season, Puchkova reached her second career final in Quebec City, Canada. She lost to Marion Bartoli 0–6, 0–6, becoming the first woman since 1993 to lose by that scoreline in a tour final, although she was injured during the final.

=== 2007–2009 ===
Puchkova made her top 100 debut in 2006, and peaked at a high of world No. 32 on 17 June 2007. However, her results soon began to tail off, and she didn't reach another quarterfinal until her last tournament of the 2007 season in Quebec City. Prior to that, she failed to win back-to-back matches on the season, although after the Bell Challenge she managed to reach the final of an ITF event in Pittsburgh, losing to Ashley Harkleroad in three sets. By the end of the season, Puchkova's ranking had fallen to 92.

At the 2008 Australian Open, she won her first-round match, but lost 1–6, 5–7 to world No. 1, Justine Henin, in the second round. Her year would improve slightly as she finished runner-up in the Charlottesville ITF event, falling to Alexis King ranked 640 in the world. She had to attempt to qualify for the French Open before falling to eventual quarterfinalist Carla Suárez Navarro of Spain in the qualifying playoff round. She then fell at the same stage in Wimbledon qualifying to Eva Hrdinová. She failed to qualify for another main draw of a tour-level tournament in 2008, but did receive direct entry into the Bell Challenge, before losing in the second round to Melanie Oudin. Her last event ended in a first-round loss in San Diego, and her ranking dipped to 159. She went 15–28 on the season.

She fell in the final round of qualifying yet again in the 2009 Australian Open, and didn't enter into a WTA tournament until she was given the opportunity to qualify for the Bell Challenge. She did manage to qualify, but lost to Amra Sadiković in the opening main-draw round. 19–22 by the end of the season, Puchkova's woes continued and she was ranked 226 in her last tournament of the year in Toronto.

=== 2012–2013 ===
After a couple of years struggling with injuries and personal problems, Puchkova managed to finish 2012 in top 100 with a semifinal in Baku and reaching third round at the 2012 US Open. In 2013, she experienced some tough draws and had four first-round losses. But she turned tables around at the 2013 Brasil Tennis Cup, where she reached the final, beating Venus Williams en route. She lost to Monica Niculescu, in a three-setter.

== Grand Slam singles performance timeline ==
Key
W	F	SF	QF	#R	RR	Q#	P#	DNQ	A	Z#	PO	G	S	B	NMS	NTI	P	NH

(W) winner; (F) finalist; (SF) semifinalist; (QF) quarterfinalist; (#R) rounds 4, 3, 2, 1; (RR) round-robin stage; (Q#) qualification round; (P#) preliminary round; (DNQ) did not qualify; (A) absent; (Z#) Davis/Fed Cup Zonal Group (with number indication) or (PO) play-off; (G) gold, (S) silver or (B) bronze Olympic/Paralympic medal; (NMS) not a Masters tournament; (NTI) not a Tier I tournament; (P) postponed; (NH) not held; (SR) strike rate (events won / competed); (W–L) win–loss record.
To avoid confusion and double counting, these charts are updated at the conclusion of a tournament or when the player's participation has ended.

Tournament	2006	2007	2008	2009	2010	2011	2012	2013	2014	W–L
Australian Open	Q1	2R	2R	Q3	A	A	Q2	1R	A	5–6
French Open	Q2	2R	Q3	Q1	A	A	Q2	1R	A	5–6
Wimbledon	Q3	1R	Q3	Q1	A	A	Q1	2R	A	5–6
US Open	1R	1R	Q1	A	A	A	3R	1R	A	8–5
Win–loss	0–1	2–4	1–1	0–0	0–0	0–0	2–1	1–4	0–0	6–11

== WTA Tour finals ==
=== Singles: 3 (runner-ups) ===
Legend
International (0–3)

Result	W–L	Date	Tournament	Tier	Surface	Opponent	Score
Loss	0–1	Sep 2006	Sunfeast Open, India	Tier III	Hard (i)	(Switzerland) Martina Hingis	0–6, 4–6
Loss	0–2	Nov 2006	Bell Challenge, Canada	Tier III	Hard (i)	(France) Marion Bartoli	0–6, 0–6
Loss	0–3	Mar 2013	Brasil Tennis Cup	International	Hard	(Romania) Monica Niculescu	2–6, 6–4, 4–6

== ITF Circuit finals ==
Legend
$100,000 tournaments
$75,000 tournaments
$50,000 tournaments
$25,000 tournaments
$10/15,000 tournaments

=== Singles: 13 (7 titles, 6 runner-ups) ===
Result	W–L	Date	Tournament	Tier	Surface	Opponent	Score
Loss	0–1	Jan 2003	ITF Miami, United States	10,000	Hard	(Latvia) Anžela Žguna	4–6, 2–6
Win	1–1	Jul 2003	ITF Baltimore, U.S.	10,000	Hard	(United States) Jewel Peterson	6–2, 6–4
Win	2–1	Jul 2004	ITF College Park, U.S.	25,000	Hard	(Paraguay) Rossana de los Ríos	7–5, 4–6, 6–2
Loss	2–2	Sep 2004	ITF Pelham, U.S.	25,000	Clay	(Slovakia) Zuzana Zemenová	6–4, 4–6, 0–6
Loss	2–3	Aug 2005	ITF Washington, U.S.	75,000	Hard	(United States) Ashley Harkleroad	2–6, 1–6
Win	3–3	Mar 2006	ITF Hammond, U.S.	25,000	Hard	(Czech Republic) Andrea Hlaváčková	6–3, 6–4
Win	4–3	Jul 2006	ITF Felixstowe, UK	25,000	Grass	(Australia) Trudi Musgrave	6–2, 6–1
Win	5–3	Aug 2006	Bronx Open, U.S.	50,000	Hard	(Belarus) Tatiana Poutchek	6–3, 6–1
Loss	5–4	Nov 2007	ITF Pittsburgh, U.S.	75,000	Hard (i)	(United States) Ashley Harkleroad	6–4, 4–6, 3–6
Loss	5–5	Apr 2008	ITF Charlottesville, U.S.	50,000	Clay	(United States) Alexis King	3–6, 3–6
Win	6–5	Apr 2011	ITF Minsk, Belarus	25,000	Hard (i)	(Ukraine) Nadiia Kichenok	6–2, 7–5
Loss	6–6	Sep 2011	ITF Redding, U.S.	25,000	Hard	(United States) Julia Boserup	4–6, 6–2, 3–6
Win	7–6	Apr 2012	ITF Namangan, Uzbekistan	25,000	Hard	(Croatia) Donna Vekić	3–6, 6–3, 6–2

=== Doubles: 3 (runner-ups) ===
Result	Date	Tournament	Tier	Surface	Partner	Opponents	Score
Loss	Oct 2002	ITF Minsk, Belarus	10,000	Carpet (i)	(Belarus) Tatsiana Uvarova	(Russia) Daria Chemarda (Russia) Vera Dushevina	1–6, 4–6
Loss	Mar 2017	ITF Nanjing, China	15,000	Hard	(Russia) Angelina Gabueva	(China) Sun Xuliu (China) Sun Ziyue	3–6, 1–6
Loss	Mar 2017	ITF Heraklion, Greece	15,000	Hard	(Russia) Angelina Gabueva	(Canada) Charlotte Robillard-Millette (Canada) Carol Zhao	6–7^{(2)}, 6–4, [5–10]
