= Brasil Tennis Cup =

Defunct tennis tournament
- Founded: 2013
- Abolished: 2016
- Editions: 4
- Location: Florianópolis; Brazil
- Category: International
- Surface: Hard / outdoor

The Brasil Tennis Cup was a professional women's tennis tournament played on outdoor hard courts in Florianópolis, Brazil. In 2015, the tournament was held on clay courts. The event was affiliated with the Women's Tennis Association (WTA), and was an International-level tournament on the WTA Tour.

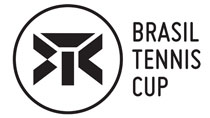
The Brasil Tennis Cup logo

== Results ==
=== Singles ===
Year	Champion	Runner-up	Score	Ref
2013	(Romania) Monica Niculescu	(Russia) Olga Puchkova	6–2, 4–6, 6–4	
2014	(Czech Republic) Klára Zakopalová	(Spain) Garbiñe Muguruza	4–6, 7–5, 6–0	
2015	(Brazil) Teliana Pereira	(Germany) Annika Beck	6–4, 4–6, 6–1	
2016	(Romania) Irina-Camelia Begu	(Hungary) Tímea Babos	2–6, 6–4, 6–3	

=== Doubles ===
Year	Champions	Runners-up	Score	Ref
2013	(Spain) Anabel Medina Garrigues (Kazakhstan) Yaroslava Shvedova	(Russia) Valeria Savinykh (United Kingdom) Anne Keothavong	6–0, 6–4	
2014	(Spain) Anabel Medina Garrigues (2) (Kazakhstan) Yaroslava Shvedova (2)	(Italy) Francesca Schiavone (Spain) Silvia Soler Espinosa	7–6^{(7–1)}, 2–6, [10–3]	
2015	(Germany) Annika Beck (Germany) Laura Siegemund	(Argentina) María Irigoyen (Poland) Paula Kania	6–3, 7–6^{(7–1)}	
2016	(Ukraine) Lyudmyla Kichenok (Ukraine) Nadiia Kichenok	(Hungary) Tímea Babos (Hungary) Réka Luca Jani	6–3, 6–1	

== See also ==
- WTA Brasil Open
