= 2001 Fed Cup Americas Zone =

Subsection of tennis competition

The Americas Zone was one of three zones of regional competition in the 2001 Fed Cup.

== Group I ==
- Venue: Montevideo, Uruguay (outdoor clay)
- Date: 23–28 April

The nine teams were divided into two pools of four and five teams. The teams that finished first in the pools played-off to determine which team would partake in the World Group play-offs. The two nations coming last in the pools were relegated to Group II for 2002.

=== Pools ===
	Pool A	CAN	BRA	PAR	ECU
1	Canada (3–0)		2–1	3–0	3–0
2	Brazil (2–1)	1–2		3–0	3–0
3	Paraguay (1–2)	0–3	0–3		3–0
4	Ecuador (0–3)	0–3	0–3	0–3	

	Pool B	VEN	MEX	COL	URU	DOM
1	Venezuela (3–1)		1–2	2–1	3–0	3–0
2	Mexico (3–1)	2–1		1–2	3–0	2–1
3	Colombia (3–1)	1–2	2–1		2–1	3–0
4	Uruguay (1–3)	0–3	0–3	1–2		2–1
5	Dominican Republic (0–4)	0–3	1–2	0–3	1–2	

=== Play-off ===
Canada
1
Montevideo, Uruguay
28 April 2001
Red clay (outdoors)

Venezuela
2

			1	2	3
1	(Canada) (Venezuela)	Sonya Jeyaseelan; Milagros Sequera	5; 7	2; 6
2	(Canada) (Venezuela)	Jana Nejedly; María Vento	6; 2	6; 0
3	(Canada) (Venezuela)	Renata Kolbovic / Jana Nejedly; Milagros Sequera / María Vento	6; 2	3; 6	1; 6

- Venezuela advanced to 2001 World Group play-offs.
- Ecuador and Dominican Republic relegated to Group II in 2002.

== Group II ==
- Venue: St. John's, Antigua and Barbuda (outdoor hard)
- Date: 15–19 May

The fourteen teams were randomly divided into four pools of three and four teams to compete in round-robin competitions. The teams then competed in knockout tournaments with teams that had taken equal placements in their pools to determine overall placings for the group. Teams finishing first and second advanced to Group I for 2002.

=== Pools ===
	Pool A	PUR	BOL	JAM
1	Puerto Rico (2–0)		3–0	3–0
2	Bolivia (1–1)	0–3		2–1
3	Jamaica (0–2)	0–3	1–2	

	Pool B	BAH	CHI	TRI
1	Bahamas (2–0)		2–1	3–0
2	Chile (1–1)	1–2		3–0
3	Trinidad and Tobago (0–2)	0–3	0–3	

	Pool C	CRC	BER	PAN	ATG
1	Costa Rica (3–0)		3–0	3–0	3–0
2	Bermuda (2–1)	0–3		3–0	2–1
3	Panama (1–2)	0–3	0–3		2–1
4	Antigua and Barbuda (0–3)	0–3	1–2	1–2	

	Pool D	CUB	GUA	ESA	BAR
1	Cuba (3–0)		3–0	3–0	3–0
2	Guatemala (2–1)	0–3		2–1	3–0
3	El Salvador (1–2)	0–3	1–2		3–0
4	Barbados (0–3)	0–3	0–3	0–3	

=== Play-offs ===
Play-offs
Cuba	2
Costa Rica	0

First round
Puerto Rico	2
Cuba	1
Costa Rica	1
Bahamas	2

Second round
Puerto Rico	2
Bahamas	0

Play-offs
Bermuda	0
Guatemala	3

First round
Bolivia	3
Bermuda	0
Guatemala	1
Chile	2

Second round
Bolivia	0
Chile	2

Play-offs
Trinidad and Tobago	2
Panama	0

First round
Jamaica	2
Trinidad and Tobago	0
El Salvador	2
Panama	0

Second round
Jamaica	2
El Salvador	1

First round 18 May
Antigua and Barbuda	2
Barbados	1

- Puerto Rico and Bahamas advanced to Group I in 2002.

== See also ==
- Fed Cup structure
