= 2001 Fed Cup Americas Zone Group II – play-offs =

International tennis competition play-offs

The play-offs of the 2001 Fed Cup Americas Zone Group II were the final stages of the Group II Zonal Competition involving teams from the Americas. Using the positions determined in their pools, the eight teams faced off to determine their overall placing in the 2001 Fed Cup Americas Group II. The top two teams (i.e. the teams that won matches in the first round of the top quarter) advanced to Group I next year.

Placing	Pool A	Pool B	Pool C	Pool D
1	Puerto Rico	Bahamas	Costa Rica	Cuba
2	Bolivia	Chile	Bermuda	Guatemala
3	Jamaica	Trinidad and Tobago	Panama	El Salvador
4			Antigua and Barbuda	Barbados

== Draw ==
Play-offs
Cuba	2
Costa Rica	0

First round
Puerto Rico	2
Cuba	1
Costa Rica	1
Bahamas	2

Second round
Puerto Rico	2
Bahamas	0

Play-offs
Bermuda	0
Guatemala	3

First round
Bolivia	3
Bermuda	0
Guatemala	1
Chile	2

Second round
Bolivia	0
Chile	2

Play-offs
Trinidad and Tobago	2
Panama	0

First round
Jamaica	2
Trinidad and Tobago	0
El Salvador	2
Panama	0

Second round
Jamaica	2
El Salvador	1

First round 18 May
Antigua and Barbuda	2
Barbados	1

=== First round ===
==== Puerto Rico vs. Cuba ====
Puerto Rico
2
St. John's, Antigua and Barbuda
18 May 2001
Laykold hard (outdoors)

Cuba
1

			1	2	3
1	(Puerto Rico) (Cuba)	Jessica Roland-Rosario; Yamile Fors Guerra	1; 6	3; 6
2	(Puerto Rico) (Cuba)	Mari Toró; Yanet Núñez Mojarena	6; 2	6; 4
3	(Puerto Rico) (Cuba)	Jessica Roland-Rosario / Mari Toró; Yamile Fors Guerra / Yanet Núñez Mojarena	7; 5	4; 6	6; 3

==== Costa Rica vs. Bahamas ====
Costa Rica
1
St. John's, Antigua and Barbuda
18 May 2001
Laykold hard (outdoors)

Bahamas
2

			1	2	3
1	(Costa Rica) (The Bahamas)	Melissa Mendieta; Larikah Russell	1; 6	2; 6
2	(Costa Rica) (The Bahamas)	Érika Villalobos Morsink; Nikkita Fountain	6; 2	6; 4
3	(Costa Rica) (The Bahamas)	Melissa Mendieta / Érika Villalobos Morsink; Nikkita Fountain / Larikah Russell	2; 6	3; 6

==== Bolivia vs. Bermuda ====
Bolivia
3
St. John's, Antigua and Barbuda
18 May 2001
Laykold hard (outdoors)

Bermuda
0

			1	2	3
1	(Bolivia) (Bermuda)	Viviana Rivero; Sasha Fisher	6; 3	6; 3
2	(Bolivia) (Bermuda)	Mónica Poveda; Shonette Wilson	6; 0	6; 2
3	(Bolivia) (Bermuda)	Claudia Herbas / Viviana Rivero; Tara Lambert / Shonette Wilson	6; 2	7^{7} 6^{0}

==== Guatemala vs. Chile ====
Guatemala
1
St. John's, Antigua and Barbuda
18 May 2001
Laykold hard (outdoors)

Chile
2

			1	2	3
1	(Guatemala) (Chile)	Lucía Henkle Gómez; Ignacia Marín	6; 2	6; 4
2	(Guatemala) (Chile)	Luise-Elfride López; Valentina Castro	1; 6	6; 0	2; 6
3	(Guatemala) (Chile)	Luise-Elfride López / Mariola Prado; Suheil Lizana / Ignacia Marín	5; 7	0; 6

==== Jamaica vs. Trinidad and Tobago ====
Jamaica
2
St. John's, Antigua and Barbuda
18 May 2001
Laykold hard (outdoors)

Trinidad and Tobago
0

			1	2	3
1	(Jamaica) (Trinidad and Tobago)	Tinesta Rowe; Tenille Elias	6; 2	6; 4
2	(Jamaica) (Trinidad and Tobago)	Kadija Richards; Lisa Fung-Kee-Fung	6; 2	6; 3
3	(Jamaica) (Trinidad and Tobago)					not played

==== El Salvador vs. Panama ====
El Salvador
2
St. John's, Antigua and Barbuda
18 May 2001
Laykold hard (outdoors)

Panama
0

			1	2	3
1	(El Salvador) (Panama)	Ingrid González; María Elena Gittens	6; 0	6; 0
2	(El Salvador) (Panama)	Claudia Argumedo; Anais Marie Moreno	6; 0	6; 0
3	(El Salvador) (Panama)					not played

==== Antigua and Barbuda vs. Barbados ====
Antigua and Barbuda
2
St. John's, Antigua and Barbuda
18 May 2001
Laykold hard (outdoors)

Barbados
1

			1	2	3
1	(Antigua and Barbuda) (Barbados)	Francine Harvey; Elena Branker	6^{3} 7^{7}	2; 6
2	(Antigua and Barbuda) (Barbados)	Niki Williams; Kyla Hunte	3; 6	6; 1	8; 6
3	(Antigua and Barbuda) (Barbados)	Isoke Perry / Niki Williams; Elena Branker / Kyla Hunte	6; 4	4; 6	7; 5

=== Repchage Round ===
==== Cuba vs. Costa Rica ====
Cuba
2
St. John's, Antigua and Barbuda
19 May 2001
Laykold hard (outdoors)

Costa Rica
0

			1	2	3
1	(Cuba) (Costa Rica)	Yamile Fors Guerra; Melissa Mendieta	3; 6	6; 3	6; 0
2	(Cuba) (Costa Rica)	Yanet Núñez Mojarena; Érika Villalobos Morsink	6; 3	6; 0
3	(Cuba) (Costa Rica)					not played

==== Bermuda vs. Guatemala ====
Bermuda
0
St. John's, Antigua and Barbuda
19 May 2001
Laykold hard (outdoors)

Guatemala
3

			1	2	3
1	(Bermuda) (Guatemala)	Sasha Fisher; Mariola Prado	0; 6	3; 6
2	(Bermuda) (Guatemala)	Zarah De Silva; Luise-Elfride López	4; 6	0; 6
3	(Bermuda) (Guatemala)	Sasha Fisher / Shonette Wilson; Lucía Henkle Gómez / Karen Saravia	2; 6	6^{1} 7^{7}

==== Trinidad and Tobago vs. Panama ====
Trinidad and Tobago
2
St. John's, Antigua and Barbuda
19 May 2001
Laykold hard (outdoors)

Panama
0

			1	2	3
1	(Trinidad and Tobago) (Panama)	Tenille Elias; Alexia Llysel Márquez	6; 2	6; 0
2	(Trinidad and Tobago) (Panama)	Lisa Fung-Kee-Fung; Anais Marie Moreno	6; 0	6; 0
3	(Trinidad and Tobago) (Panama)					not played

=== Second round ===
==== Puerto Rico vs. Bahamas ====
Puerto Rico
2
St. John's, Antigua and Barbuda
19 May 2001
Laykold hard (outdoors)

Bahamas
0

			1	2	3
1	(Puerto Rico) (The Bahamas)	Jessica Roland-Rosario; Larikah Russell	6; 4	6; 1
2	(Puerto Rico) (The Bahamas)	Mari Toró; Nikkita Fountain	6; 1	6; 1
3	(Puerto Rico) (The Bahamas)					not played

==== Bolivia vs. Chile ====
Bolivia
0
St. John's, Antigua and Barbuda
19 May 2001
Laykold hard (outdoors)

Chile
2

			1	2	3
1	(Bolivia) (Chile)	Mónica Poveda; Suheil Lizana	1; 6	4; 6
2	(Bolivia) (Chile)	Daniela Álvarez; Valentina Castro	0; 5			retired
3	(Bolivia) (Chile)					not played

==== Jamaica vs. El Salvador ====
Jamaica
2
St. John's, Antigua and Barbuda
19 May 2001
Laykold hard (outdoors)

El Salvador
1

			1	2	3
1	(Jamaica) (El Salvador)	Tinesta Rowe; Ingrid González	3; 6	6; 2	8; 6
2	(Jamaica) (El Salvador)	Kadija Richards; Claudia Argumedo	6^{7} 7^{9}	1; 6
3	(Jamaica) (El Salvador)	Alexandra Chong / Tinesta Rowe; Ingrid González / Ana Osorio	6; 3	6; 3

== Final Placements ==
Placing	Teams
First	Puerto Rico
Second	Bahamas
Third	Cuba
Fourth	Costa Rica
Fifth	Chile
Sixth	Bolivia
Seventh	Guatemala
Eighth	Bermuda
Ninth	Jamaica
Tenth	El Salvador
Eleventh	Trinidad and Tobago
Twelfth	Panama
Thirteenth	Antigua and Barbuda
Fourteenth	Barbados

- Puerto Rico and Bahamas advanced to Group I for next year, where they respectively placed last and third in the same pool of four. Puerto Rico, thus, was relegated back down to Group II for 2003.

== See also ==
- Fed Cup structure
