= 1997 Fed Cup Americas Zone =

Subsection of tennis competition

The Americas Zone was one of three zones of regional competition in the 1997 Fed Cup.

== Group I ==
- Venue: Colombian Tennis Academy, Bogotá, Colombia (outdoor clay)
- Date: 29 April – 4 May

The nine teams were divided into one pool of five and one pool of four teams. The top two teams from each pool then moved on to the play-off stage of the competition. The four teams that won one match from the play-off stage would advance to Group I for 1998.

=== Pools ===
	Pool A	CAN	BRA	ECU	MEX
1	Canada (3–0)		3–0	3–0	3–0
2	Brazil (2–1)	0–3		3–0	2–1
3	Ecuador (1–2)	0–3	0–3		2–1
4	Mexico (0–3)	0–3	1–2	1–2	

	Pool B	COL	PER	CHI	VEN	PUR
1	Colombia (3–0)		3–0	w/o	3–0	3–0
2	Peru (2–2)	0–3		2–1	1–2	2–1
3	Chile (2–1)	w/o	1–2		2–1	3–0
4	Venezuela (1–3)	0–3	2–1	1–2		1–2
5	Puerto Rico (1–3)	0–3	1–2	0–3	2–1	

=== Knockout stage ===
Semifinals; 3 May
Canada	3
Peru	0
Brazil	0
Colombia	3

Final; 4 May
Canada	2
Colombia	1

- Canada advanced to World Group II Play-offs.
- Mexico and Puerto Rico relegated to Group II in 1998.

== Group II ==
- Venue: Casa de Campo, Santo Domingo, Dominican Republic (outdoor clay)
- Date: 12–18 May

The fifteen teams were divided into two pools of seven and eight. The top team from each pool then moved would advance to Group I for 1998.

=== Pools ===
	Pool A	PAR	DOM	TRI	PAN	GUA	BAH	BAR
1	Paraguay (6–0)		2–1	3–0	3–0	3–0	3–0	3–0
2	Dominican Republic (5–1)	1–2		2–1	3–0	3–0	3–0	3–0
3	Trinidad and Tobago (4–2)	0–3	1–2		3–0	3–0	3–0	2–1
4	Panama (3–3)	0–3	0–3	0–3		2–1	2–1	3–0
5	Guatemala (2–4)	0–3	0–3	0–3	1–2		2–1	2–1
6	Bahamas (1–5)	0–3	0–3	0–3	1–2	1–2		2–1
7	Barbados (0–6)	0–3	0–3	1–2	0–3	1–2	1–2	

	Pool B	URU	CUB	JAM	BOL	CRC	ESA	BER	ATG
1	Uruguay (7–0)		2–1	3–0	2–1	3–0	3–0	3–0	3–0
2	Cuba (6–1)	1–2		2–1	2–1	3–0	3–0	3–0	3–0
3	Jamaica (5–2)	0–3	1–2		2–1	3–0	3–0	3–0	3–0
4	Bolivia (4–3)	1–2	1–2	1–2		2–1	2–1	3–0	3–0
5	Costa Rica (3–4)	0–3	0–3	0–3	1–2		2–1	3–0	3–0
6	El Salvador (2–5)	0–3	0–3	1–2	1–2	1–2		3–0	3–0
7	Bermuda (1–6)	0–3	0–3	0–3	0–3	0–3	0–3		3–0
8	Antigua and Barbuda (0–7)	0–3	0–3	0–3	0–3	0–3	0–3	0–3	

- Paraguay and Uruguay advanced to Group I in 1998.

== See also ==
- Fed Cup structure
