= 1998 Fed Cup Americas Zone Group II – Pool A =

International tennis competition

Group A was one of two pools in the Americas Zone Group II of the 1998 Fed Cup. Eight teams competed in a round robin competition, with the top team advancing to Group I in 1999.

	(Mexico) MEX	(El Salvador) ESA	(Haiti) HAI	(Guatemala) GUA	(Costa Rica) CRC	(Barbados) BAR	(Bermuda) BER	(Antigua and Barbuda) ATG	Match; W–L	Set; W–L	Game; W–L	Standings
Mexico		3–0	3–0	3–0	3–0	3–0	3–0	3–0	7–0	42–0	252–56	1
El Salvador	0–3		3–0	2–1	3–0	3–0	3–0	3–0	6–1	34–12	202–144	2
Haiti	0–3	0–3		3–0	1–2	2–1	3–0	3–0	4–3	28–21	235–208	3
Guatemala	0–3	1–2	0–3		2–1	3–0	2–1	3–0	4–3	25–20	212–188	4
Costa Rica	0–3	0–3	2–1	1–2		3–0	3–0	3–0	4–3	25–21	233–191	5
Barbados	0–3	0–3	1–2	0–3	0–3		2–1	3–0	2–5	15–33	163–234	6
Bermuda	0–3	0–3	0–3	1–2	0–3	1–2		2–1	1–6	9–39	160–250	7
Antigua and Barbuda	0–3	0–3	0–3	0–3	0–3	0–3	1–2		0–7	3–41	53–256	8

== Mexico vs. Bermuda ==
Mexico
3
Chipinque Racquet Club, Monterrey, Mexico
27 April 1998
Hard (outdoors)

Bermuda
0

			1	2	3
1	(Mexico) (Bermuda)	Karin Palme; Kelly Holland	6; 0	6; 0
2	(Mexico) (Bermuda)	Jessica Fernández; Danielle Paynter	6; 0	6; 0
3	(Mexico) (Bermuda)	Melody Falcó / Paola Palencia; Elizabeth Osborne / Allison Tolson	6; 1	6; 1

== El Salvador vs. Barbados ==
El Salvador
3
Chipinque Racquet Club, Monterrey, Mexico
27 April 1998
Hard (outdoors)

Barbados
0

			1	2	3
1	(El Salvador) (Barbados)	Ingrid González; Kim Brandford	6; 1	7; 5
2	(El Salvador) (Barbados)	Claudia Castro; Richele Le Saldo	7^{7} 6^{4}	6; 1
3	(El Salvador) (Barbados)	Claudia Castro / Ingrid González; Kim Brandford / Richele Le Saldo	6; 4	7^{9} 6^{7}

== Haiti vs. Guatemala ==
Haiti
3
Chipinque Racquet Club, Monterrey, Mexico
27 April 1998
Hard (outdoors)

Guatemala
0

			1	2	3
1	(Haiti) (Guatemala)	Jennifer Adrien; María Fernanda Carrillo	1; 6	7^{9} 6^{7}	6; 4
2	(Haiti) (Guatemala)	Neyssa Etienne; Luise-Elfride López	6; 3	6; 0
3	(Haiti) (Guatemala)	Emmanuelle Duval / Neyssa Etienne; Karla Lehnoff / Luise-Elfride López	7^{7} 6^{3}	5; 7	8; 6

== Costa Rica vs. Antigua and Barbuda ==
Costa Rica
3
Chipinque Racquet Club, Monterrey, Mexico
27 April 1998
Hard (outdoors)

Antigua and Barbuda
0

			1	2	3
1	(Costa Rica) (Antigua and Barbuda)	Melissa Mendieta; Isoke Perry	6; 1	6; 1
2	(Costa Rica) (Antigua and Barbuda)	Melissa Golfin; Niki Williams	6; 0	6; 0
3	(Costa Rica) (Antigua and Barbuda)	Paola Almeida / Paula Umaña; Francine Harvey / Cheryl Lewis	6; 0	6; 1

== Mexico vs. Antigua and Barbuda ==
Mexico
3
Chipinque Racquet Club, Monterrey, Mexico
28 April 1998
Hard (outdoors)

Antigua and Barbuda
0

			1	2	3
1	(Mexico) (Antigua and Barbuda)	Karin Palme; Cheryl Lewis	6; 0	6; 0
2	(Mexico) (Antigua and Barbuda)	Jessica Fernández; Isoke Perry	6; 0	6; 0
3	(Mexico) (Antigua and Barbuda)	Melody Falcó / Paola Palencia; Francine Harvey / Niki Williams	6; 0	6; 0

== El Salvador vs. Haiti ==
El Salvador
3
Chipinque Racquet Club, Monterrey, Mexico
28 April 1998
Hard (outdoors)

Haiti
0

			1	2	3
1	(El Salvador) (Haiti)	Ingrid González; Jennifer Adrien	6; 4	6^{6} 7^{8}	6; 1
2	(El Salvador) (Haiti)	Claudia Castro; Neyssa Etienne	6; 2	6; 4
3	(El Salvador) (Haiti)	Claudia Castro / Ingrid González; Jennifer Adrien / Neyssa Etienne	6^{4} 7^{7}	6; 2	6; 3

== Guatemala vs. Costa Rica ==
Guatemala
2
Chipinque Racquet Club, Monterrey, Mexico
28 April 1998
Hard (outdoors)

Costa Rica
1

			1	2	3
1	(Guatemala) (Costa Rica)	Karla Lehnoff; Karla Umaña	7^{7} 6^{4}	6; 4
2	(Guatemala) (Costa Rica)	María Fernanda Carrillo; Melissa Golfin	7; 5	6; 4
3	(Guatemala) (Costa Rica)	María Fernanda Carrillo / Luise-Elfride López; Paola Almeida / Melissa Mendieta	6^{3} 7^{7}	6^{4} 7^{7}

== Barbados vs. Bermuda ==
Barbados
2
Chipinque Racquet Club, Monterrey, Mexico
28 April 1998
Hard (outdoors)

Bermuda
1

			1	2	3
1	(Barbados) (Bermuda)	Marisa Howell; Kelly Holland	6; 4	6^{3} 7^{7}	5; 7
2	(Barbados) (Bermuda)	Richele Le Saldo; Danielle Paynter	6^{4} 7^{7}	6; 1	6; 4
3	(Barbados) (Bermuda)	Kim Brandford / Richele Le Saldo; Danielle Paynter / Allison Tolson	6; 3	1; 6	8; 6

== Mexico vs. Barbados ==
Mexico
3
Chipinque Racquet Club, Monterrey, Mexico
29 April 1998
Hard (outdoors)

Barbados
0

			1	2	3
1	(Mexico) (Barbados)	Karin Palme; Donna Fields-Gibbs	6; 0	6; 0
2	(Mexico) (Barbados)	Jessica Fernández; Richele Le Saldo	6; 2	6; 3
3	(Mexico) (Barbados)	Melody Falcó / Paola Palencia; Kim Brandford / Richele Le Saldo	6; 0	6; 2

== El Salvador vs. Costa Rica ==
El Salvador
3
Chipinque Racquet Club, Monterrey, Mexico
29 April 1998
Hard (outdoors)

Costa Rica
0

			1	2	3
1	(El Salvador) (Costa Rica)	Ingrid González; Paula Umaña	6; 2	6; 3
2	(El Salvador) (Costa Rica)	Claudia Castro; Melissa Mendieta	7; 5	6; 2
3	(El Salvador) (Costa Rica)	Claudia Castro / Ingrid González; Paola Almeida / Melissa Golfin	4; 6	6; 1	6; 2

== Haiti vs. Bermuda ==
Haiti
3
Chipinque Racquet Club, Monterrey, Mexico
29 April 1998
Hard (outdoors)

Bermuda
0

			1	2	3
1	(Haiti) (Bermuda)	Jennifer Adrien; Allison Tolson	6; 4	6; 1
2	(Haiti) (Bermuda)	Neyssa Etienne; Danielle Paynter	6; 2	6; 1
3	(Haiti) (Bermuda)	Emmanuelle Duval / Neyssa Etienne; Elizabeth Osborne / Allison Tolson	6; 0	6; 2

== Guatemala vs. Antigua and Barbuda ==
Guatemala
3
Chipinque Racquet Club, Monterrey, Mexico
29 April 1998
Hard (outdoors)

Antigua and Barbuda
0

			1	2	3
1	(Guatemala) (Antigua and Barbuda)	Karla Lehnoff; Cheryl Lewis	6; 0	6; 1
2	(Guatemala) (Antigua and Barbuda)	María Fernanda Carrillo; Niki Williams	6; 0	6; 2
3	(Guatemala) (Antigua and Barbuda)	María Fernanda Carrillo / Luise-Elfride López; Isoke Perry / Niki Williams	6; 0	6; 1

== Mexico vs. Guatemala ==
Mexico
3
Chipinque Racquet Club, Monterrey, Mexico
30 April 1998
Hard (outdoors)

Guatemala
0

			1	2	3
1	(Mexico) (Guatemala)	Karin Palme; Karla Lehnoff	6; 0	6; 1
2	(Mexico) (Guatemala)	Jessica Fernández; Luise-Elfride López	6; 0	6; 0
3	(Mexico) (Guatemala)	Melody Falcó / Paola Palencia; María Fernanda Carrillo / Luise-Elfride López	6; 1	6; 2

== El Salvador vs. Antigua and Barbuda ==
El Salvador
3
Chipinque Racquet Club, Monterrey, Mexico
30 April 1998
Hard (outdoors)

Antigua and Barbuda
0

			1	2	3
1	(El Salvador) (Antigua and Barbuda)	Claudia Argumedo; Cheryl Lewis	6; 2	6; 1
2	(El Salvador) (Antigua and Barbuda)	Claudia Castro; Isoke Perry	6; 0	6; 0
3	(El Salvador) (Antigua and Barbuda)	Claudia Argumedo / Claudia Castro; Cheryl Lewis / Isoke Perry	6; 2	6; 0

== Haiti vs. Barbados ==
Haiti
2
Chipinque Racquet Club, Monterrey, Mexico
30 April 1998
Hard (outdoors)

Barbados
1

			1	2	3
1	(Haiti) (Barbados)	Jennifer Adrien; Marisa Howell	6; 1	6; 2
2	(Haiti) (Barbados)	Neyssa Etienne; Richele Le Saldo	6; 0	6; 1
3	(Haiti) (Barbados)	Jennifer Adrien / Emmanuelle Duval; Kim Brandford / Donna Fields-Gibbs	6; 3	2; 6	1; 6

== Costa Rica vs. Bermuda ==
Costa Rica
3
Chipinque Racquet Club, Monterrey, Mexico
30 April 1998
Hard (outdoors)

Bermuda
0

			1	2	3
1	(Costa Rica) (Bermuda)	Melissa Mendieta; Elizabeth Osborne	6; 3	6; 0
2	(Costa Rica) (Bermuda)	Melissa Golfin; Danielle Paynter	6; 1	6; 0
3	(Costa Rica) (Bermuda)	Paola Almeida / Melissa Mendieta; Danielle Paynter / Allison Tolson	6; 4	5; 7	6; 4

== Mexico vs. Haiti ==
Mexico
3
Chipinque Racquet Club, Monterrey, Mexico
1 May 1998
Hard (outdoors)

Haiti
0

			1	2	3
1	(Mexico) (Haiti)	Karin Palme; Jennifer Adrien	6; 0	6; 3
2	(Mexico) (Haiti)	Jessica Fernández; Neyssa Etienne	6; 4	7^{7} 6^{1}
3	(Mexico) (Haiti)	Melody Falcó / Paola Palencia; Jennifer Adrien / Neyssa Etienne	6; 1	6; 0

== El Salvador vs. Guatemala ==
El Salvador
2
Chipinque Racquet Club, Monterrey, Mexico
1 May 1998
Hard (outdoors)

Guatemala
1

			1	2	3
1	(El Salvador) (Guatemala)	Ingrid González; María Fernanda Carrillo	6; 0	6; 2
2	(El Salvador) (Guatemala)	Claudia Castro; Luise-Elfride López	2; 6	5; 7
3	(El Salvador) (Guatemala)	Claudia Castro / Ingrid González; María Fernanda Carrillo / Luise-Elfride López	4; 6	6; 2	6; 3

== Costa Rica vs. Barbados ==
Costa Rica
3
Chipinque Racquet Club, Monterrey, Mexico
1 May 1998
Hard (outdoors)

Barbados
0

			1	2	3
1	(Costa Rica) (Barbados)	Melissa Mendieta; Kim Brandford	6; 1	6; 3
2	(Costa Rica) (Barbados)	Melissa Golfin; Richele Le Saldo	6; 2	6; 1
3	(Costa Rica) (Barbados)	Melissa Mendieta / Paula Umaña; Kim Brandford / Donna Fields-Gibbs	6^{5} 7^{7}	6; 2	6; 1

== Bermuda vs. Antigua and Barbuda ==
Bermuda
2
Chipinque Racquet Club, Monterrey, Mexico
1 May 1998
Hard (outdoors)

Antigua and Barbuda
1

			1	2	3
1	(Bermuda) (Antigua and Barbuda)	Elizabeth Osborne; Isoke Perry	6; 0	6; 4
2	(Bermuda) (Antigua and Barbuda)	Kelly Holland; Niki Williams	4; 6	6; 4	4; 6
3	(Bermuda) (Antigua and Barbuda)	Kelly Holland / Allison Tolson; Francine Harvey / Isoke Perry	6; 0	6; 0

== Mexico vs. El Salvador ==
Mexico
3
Chipinque Racquet Club, Monterrey, Mexico
2 May 1998
Hard (outdoors)

El Salvador
0

			1	2	3
1	(Mexico) (El Salvador)	Karin Palme; Ingrid González	6; 0	6; 0
2	(Mexico) (El Salvador)	Jessica Fernández; Claudia Castro	7; 5	6; 2
3	(Mexico) (El Salvador)	Melody Falcó / Paola Palencia; Claudia Argumedo / Ingrid González	6; 1	6; 1

== Haiti vs. Costa Rica ==
Haiti
1
Chipinque Racquet Club, Monterrey, Mexico
2 May 1998
Hard (outdoors)

Costa Rica
2

			1	2	3
1	(Haiti) (Costa Rica)	Jennifer Adrien; Melissa Mendieta	4; 6	4; 6
2	(Haiti) (Costa Rica)	Neyssa Etienne; Melissa Golfin	6; 4	7^{7} 6^{1}
3	(Haiti) (Costa Rica)	Jennifer Adrien / Neyssa Etienne; Melissa Golfin / Paula Umaña	7^{7} 6^{2}	2; 6	5; 7

== Guatemala vs. Bermuda ==
Guatemala
2
Chipinque Racquet Club, Monterrey, Mexico
2 May 1998
Hard (outdoors)

Bermuda
1

			1	2	3
1	(Guatemala) (Bermuda)	Karla Lehnoff; Elizabeth Osborne	6; 3	6; 1
2	(Guatemala) (Bermuda)	María Fernanda Carrillo; Danielle Paynter	6^{3} 7^{7}	3; 6
3	(Guatemala) (Bermuda)	María Fernanda Carrillo / Luise-Elfride López; Kelly Holland / Allison Tolson	6; 2	6; 4

== Barbados vs. Antigua and Barbuda ==
Barbados
3
Chipinque Racquet Club, Monterrey, Mexico
2 May 1998
Hard (outdoors)

Antigua and Barbuda
0

			1	2	3
1	(Barbados) (Antigua and Barbuda)	Donna Fields-Gibbs; Isoke Perry	6; 0	6; 0
2	(Barbados) (Antigua and Barbuda)	Richele Le Saldo; Niki Williams	6; 0	6; 0
3	(Barbados) (Antigua and Barbuda)	Kim Brandford / Marisa Howell; Francine Harvey / Niki Williams	6; 2	6; 1

== Mexico vs. Costa Rica ==
Mexico
3
Chipinque Racquet Club, Monterrey, Mexico
3 May 1998
Hard (outdoors)

Costa Rica
0

			1	2	3
1	(Mexico) (Costa Rica)	Melody Falcó; Melissa Mendieta	7; 5	6; 2
2	(Mexico) (Costa Rica)	Paola Palencia; Melissa Golfin	6; 4	6; 3
3	(Mexico) (Costa Rica)	Jessica Fernández / Karin Palme; Melissa Mendieta / Paula Umaña	7; 5	6; 0

== El Salvador vs. Bermuda ==
El Salvador
3
Chipinque Racquet Club, Monterrey, Mexico
3 May 1998
Hard (outdoors)

Bermuda
0

			1	2	3
1	(El Salvador) (Bermuda)	Ingrid González; Elizabeth Osborne	6; 0	6; 2
2	(El Salvador) (Bermuda)	Claudia Castro; Danielle Paynter	6; 0	6; 1
3	(El Salvador) (Bermuda)	Claudia Argumedo / Ingrid González; Danielle Paynter / Allison Tolson	6; 1	6; 4

== Haiti vs. Antigua and Barbuda ==
Haiti
3
Chipinque Racquet Club, Monterrey, Mexico
3 May 1998
Hard (outdoors)

Antigua and Barbuda
0

			1	2	3
1	(Haiti) (Antigua and Barbuda)	Emmanuelle Duval; Isoke Perry	6^{2} 7^{7}	6; 3	6; 3
2	(Haiti) (Antigua and Barbuda)	Neyssa Etienne; Niki Williams	6; 1	6; 1
3	(Haiti) (Antigua and Barbuda)	Emmanuelle Duval / Neyssa Etienne; Isoke Perry / Niki Williams	6; 1	6; 2

== Guatemala vs. Barbados ==
Guatemala
3
Chipinque Racquet Club, Monterrey, Mexico
3 May 1998
Hard (outdoors)

Barbados
0

			1	2	3
1	(Guatemala) (Barbados)	Karla Lehnoff; Marisa Howell	6; 2	6; 0
2	(Guatemala) (Barbados)	María Fernanda Carrillo; Richele Le Saldo	6; 3	6; 0
3	(Guatemala) (Barbados)	María Fernanda Carrillo / Luise-Elfride López; Kim Brandford / Donna Fields-Gibbs	6; 2	6; 4

- Mexico placed first in the pool, and thus advanced to Group I in 1999, where they placed fourth in their pool of five.

== See also ==
- Fed Cup structure
