= 2013 Fed Cup Americas Zone =

Subsection of tennis competition

The Americas Zone was one of three zones of regional competition in the 2013 Fed Cup.

== Group I ==
- Venue: Country Club de Ejecutivos, Medellín, Colombia (outdoor clay)
- Dates: 6–9 February

The eight teams were divided into two pools of four teams. The two pool winners took part in play-offs to determine the nation advancing to the World Group II Play-offs. The nations in second place in each pool played off against each other to determine the final positions within the group. For the relegation Play-off, the nations in third place in each pool played off against the nations in fourth position in the other pool to determine which two nations were relegated to Americas Zone Group II in 2014.

=== Pools ===
	Pool A	CAN	COL	VEN	PER
1	Canada (3–0)		2–0	3–0	3–0
2	Colombia (2–1)	0–2		3–0	3–0
3	Venezuela (1–2)	0–3	0–3		2–1
4	Peru (0–3)	0–3	0–3	1–2	

	Pool B	BRA	PAR	MEX	CHI
1	Brazil (3–0)		2–0	3–0	3–0
2	Paraguay (2–1)	0–2		3–0	2–1
3	Mexico (1–2)	0–3	0–3		2–0
4	Chile (0–3)	0–3	1–2	0–2	

=== Play-offs ===
Placing	A Team	Score	B Team
Promotion	Canada	2–1	Brazil
3rd–4th	Colombia	1–2	Paraguay
Relegation	Venezuela	2–1	Chile
Relegation	Peru	0–3	Mexico

- Canada advanced to World Group II play-offs.
- Chile and Peru were relegated to Americas Zone Group II in 2014.

== Group II ==
- Venue: Maya Country Club, Santa Tecla, El Salvador
- Dates: 16–20 July

The eleven teams were divided into two pools of five and six teams. The winner of each pool was promoted to Americas Zone Group I in 2014.

=== Pools ===
	Pool A	ECU	BOL	GUA	PUR	HON
1	Ecuador (4–0)		2–1	2–1	3–0	3–0
2	Bolivia (3–1)	1–2		2–1	2–1	3–0
3	Guatemala (2–2)	1–2	1–2		2–1	3–0
4	Puerto Rico (1–3)	0–3	1–2	1–2		2–1
5	Honduras (0–4)	0–3	0–3	0–3	1–2	

	Pool B	BAH	DOM	URU	ESA	TRI	CRC
1	Bahamas (5–0)		2–1	3–0	3–0	2–1	3–0
2	Dominican Republic (4–1)	1–2		2–1	2–1	2–1	3–0
3	Uruguay (3–2)	0–3	1–2		2–1	2–1	2–1
4	El Salvador (2–3)	0–3	1–2	1–2		2–1	2–1
5	Trinidad and Tobago (1–4)	1–2	1–2	1–2	1–2		3–0
6	Costa Rica (0–5)	0–3	0–3	1–2	1–2	0–3	

- Ecuador and Bahamas were promoted to Americas Zone Group I in 2014.

== See also ==
- Fed Cup structure
