= 1997 Fed Cup =

International women's tennis competition

Details
- Duration: 1 March – 5 October
- Edition: 35th

Achievements (singles)

The 1997 Fed Cup was the 35th edition of the most important competition between national teams in women's tennis. The final took place at Brabant Hall in 's-Hertogenbosch in the Netherlands on 4–5 October, with France defeating the Netherlands to win their first title.

== World Group ==
Participating teams
Belgium	Czech Republic	France	Germany
Japan	Netherlands	Spain	United States

=== Draw ===
Quarterfinals; 1–2 March
Haarlem, Netherlands (Indoor carpet)
1	United States	2
Netherlands	3
Mannheim, Germany (Indoor hard)
Czech Republic	3
4	Germany	2
Tokyo, Japan (Indoor hard)
3	France	4
Japan	1
Sprimont, Belgium (Indoor hard)
Belgium	5
2	Spain	0

Semifinals; 12–13 July
Prague, Czech Republic (Outdoor clay)
Netherlands	3
Czech Republic	2
Nice, France (Outdoor clay)
3	France	3
Belgium	2

Final; 4–5 October
's-Hertogenbosch, Netherlands (Indoor carpet)
Netherlands	1
3	France	4

== World Group play-offs ==
The four losing teams in the World Group first round ties (Germany, Japan, Spain and United States), and four winners of the World Group II ties (Argentina, Australia, Croatia and Switzerland) entered the draw for the World Group play-offs.

Date: 12–13 July

Venue	Surface	Home team	Score	Visiting team
Hope Island, Australia	Outdoor hard	Australia	2–3	Spain
Zürich, Switzerland	Indoor carpet	Switzerland	5–0	Argentina
Frankfurt, Germany	Outdoor carpet	Germany	3–2	Croatia
Chestnut Hill, MA, United States	Outdoor hard	United States	5–0	Japan

== World Group II ==
The World Group II was the second highest level of Fed Cup competition in 1997. Winners advanced to the World Group play-offs, and loser played in the World Group II play-offs.

Date: 1–2 March

Venue	Surface	Home team	Score	Visiting team
Zagreb, Croatia	Indoor hard	Croatia	4–1	Austria
Košice, Slovakia	Indoor carpet	Slovakia	2–3	Switzerland
Seoul, South Korea	Outdoor hard	South Korea	1–4	Argentina
Durban, South Africa	Outdoor hard	South Africa	2–3	Australia

== World Group II play-offs ==
The four losing teams from World Group II (Austria, Slovakia, South Africa and South Korea) played off against qualifiers from Zonal Group I. Two teams qualified from Europe/Africa Zone (Italy and Russia), one team from the Asia/Oceania Zone (Indonesia), and one team from the Americas Zone (Canada).

Date: 12–13 July

Venue	Surface	Home team	Score	Visiting team
Pörtschach, Austria	Outdoor clay	Austria	3–2	South Africa
Seoul, South Korea	Outdoor clay	South Korea	1–4	Russia
Jakarta, Indonesia	Outdoor clay	Indonesia	0–5	Italy
Bratislava, Slovakia	Outdoor clay	Slovakia	5–0	Canada

== Americas Zone ==
- Nations in **bold** advanced to the higher level of competition.
- Nations in italics were relegated down to a lower level of competition.

=== Group I ===
Venue: Colombian Tennis Academy, Bogotá, Colombia (outdoor clay)

Dates: 29 April – 4 May

Participating teams

- Brazil
- **Canada**
- Chile
- Colombia
- Ecuador
- Mexico
- Peru
- Puerto Rico
- Venezuela

=== Group II ===
Venue: Casa de Campo, San Domingo, Dominican Republic (outdoor clay)

Dates: 12–18 May

Participating teams

- Antigua and Barbuda
- Bahamas
- Barbados
- Bermuda
- Bolivia
- Costa Rica
- Cuba
- Dominican Republic
- El Salvador
- Guatemala
- Jamaica
- Panama
- **Paraguay**
- Trinidad and Tobago
- **Uruguay**

== Asia/Oceania Zone ==
- Nations in **bold** advanced to the higher level of competition.
- Nations in italics were relegated down to a lower level of competition.

=== Group I ===
Venue: Renouf Centre, Wellington, New Zealand (outdoor hard)

Dates: 11–15 March

Participating teams

- China
- Chinese Taipei
- Hong Kong
- India
- **Indonesia**
- Kazakhstan
- New Zealand
- Thailand

=== Group II ===
Venue: Renouf Centre, Wellington, New Zealand (outdoor hard)

Dates: 11–15 March

Participating teams

- Malaysia
- Pacific Oceania
- Pakistan
- **Philippines**
- Singapore
- Sri Lanka
- Syria
- **Uzbekistan**

== Europe/Africa Zone ==
- Nations in **bold** advanced to the higher level of competition.
- Nations in italics were relegated down to a lower level of competition.

=== Group I ===
Venue: Bari T.C., Bari, Italy (outdoor clay)

Dates: 22–26 April

Participating teams

- Belarus
- Bulgaria
- Finland
- Georgia
- Greece
- Hungary
- Israel
- **Italy**
- Latvia
- Poland
- Romania
- **Russia**
- Slovenia
- Sweden
- Ukraine

=== Group II ===
Venue: Ali Bey Club, Manavgat, Turkey (outdoor clay)

Dates: 5–11 May

Participating teams

- Algeria
- Armenia
- Bosnia and Herzegovina
- Botswana
- Cameroon
- Cyprus
- Denmark
- Egypt
- Estonia
- Ethiopia
- **Great Britain**
- Ireland
- Iceland
- Liechtenstein
- Lithuania
- Luxembourg
- Macedonia
- **Madagascar**
- Malta
- Norway
- **Portugal**
- San Marino
- Tunisia
- Turkey
- **FR Yugoslavia**
