= 1996 Fed Cup Americas Zone Group II – Pool A =

Group A of the 1996 Fed Cup Americas Zone Group II was one of two pools in the Americas Zone Group II of the 1996 Fed Cup. Six teams competed in a round robin competition, with the teams coming first advancing to Group I in 1997.

	(Ecuador) ECU	(Bolivia) BOL	(El Salvador) ESA	(Guatemala) GUA	(The Bahamas) BAH	(Barbados) BAR	Match; W–L	Set; W–L	Game; W–L	Standings
Ecuador		3–0	3–0	3–0	3–0	3–0	5–0	30–0	182–57	1
Bolivia	0–3		3–0	3–0	3–0	3–0	4–1	24–12	176–130	2
El Salvador	0–3	0–3		3–0	3–0	3–0	3–2	20–16	164–142	3
Guatemala	0–3	0–3	0–3		2–1	3–0	2–3	15–21	136–160	4
Bahamas	0–3	0–3	0–3	1–2		2–1	1–4	9–25	111–177	5
Barbados	0–3	0–3	0–3	0–3	1–2		0–5	4–28	84–187	6

== Ecuador vs. Barbados ==
Ecuador
3
Santo Domingo, Dominican Republic
7 May 1996
Har-Tru clay (outdoors)

Barbados
0

			1	2	3
1	(Ecuador) (Barbados)	Alexandra Guzmán; Kyla Hunte	6; 3	6; 1
2	(Ecuador) (Barbados)	María Dolores Campana; Jennifer Carter	6; 2	6; 0
3	(Ecuador) (Barbados)	Nuria Niemes / María de los Ángeles Ycaza; Jennifer Carter / Susan King	6; 2	6; 0

== Bolivia vs. Guatemala ==
Bolivia
3
Santo Domingo, Dominican Republic
7 May 1996
Har-Tru clay (outdoors)

Guatemala
0

			1	2	3
1	(Bolivia) (Guatemala)	María Alejandra Claure; Florea de María Urrea	6; 3	6; 1
2	(Bolivia) (Guatemala)	Mónica Poveda; Mónica Agüero	4; 6	6; 1	7; 5
3	(Bolivia) (Guatemala)	Gabriela Calderón / María Alejandra Claure; Mariola Prado / Florea de María Urrea	3; 6	6; 4	6; 1

== El Salvador vs. Bahamas ==
El Salvador
3
Santo Domingo, Dominican Republic
7 May 1996
Har-Tru clay (outdoors)

Bahamas
0

			1	2	3
1	(El Salvador) (The Bahamas)	Annette Falkenberg; Ann Simons	6; 0	6; 3
2	(El Salvador) (The Bahamas)	Ingrid González; Kim Cartwright	2; 6	6; 3	6; 2
3	(El Salvador) (The Bahamas)	Annette Falkenberg / Renate Wachtler; Chris-Anne Aston / Dyphany Wilkinson	6; 1	6; 2

== Ecuador vs. El Salvador ==
Ecuador
3
Santo Domingo, Dominican Republic
8 May 1996
Har-Tru clay (outdoors)

El Salvador
0

			1	2	3
1	(Ecuador) (El Salvador)	Alexandra Guzmán; Annette Falkenberg	6; 1	6; 4
2	(Ecuador) (El Salvador)	María Dolores Campana; Ingrid González	6; 1	6; 3
3	(Ecuador) (El Salvador)	María Dolores Campana / Nuria Niemes; Annette Falkenberg / Renate Wachtler	7; 5	6; 0

== Bolivia vs. Bahamas ==
Bolivia
3
Santo Domingo, Dominican Republic
8 May 1996
Har-Tru clay (outdoors)

Bahamas
0

			1	2	3
1	(Bolivia) (The Bahamas)	María Alejandra Claure; Ann Simons	6; 1	6; 4
2	(Bolivia) (The Bahamas)	Mónica Poveda; Kim Cartwright	6; 2	6; 1
3	(Bolivia) (The Bahamas)	Gabriela Calderón / María Alejandra Claure; Chris-Anne Aston / Kim Cartwright	6; 4	4; 6	6; 1

== Guatemala vs. Barbados ==
Guatemala
3
Santo Domingo, Dominican Republic
8 May 1996
Har-Tru clay (outdoors)

Barbados
0

			1	2	3
1	(Guatemala) (Barbados)	Florea de María Urrea; Kyla Hunte	7; 5	6; 1
2	(Guatemala) (Barbados)	Mónica Agüero; Jennifer Carter	6; 0	6; 0
3	(Guatemala) (Barbados)	Mariola Prado / Florea de María Urrea; Donna Fields-Gibbs / Susan King	6; 0	6; 3

== El Salvador vs. Guatemala ==
El Salvador
3
Santo Domingo, Dominican Republic
9 May 1996
Har-Tru clay (outdoors)

Guatemala
0

			1	2	3
1	(El Salvador) (Guatemala)	Annette Falkenberg; Florea de María Urrea	6; 4	4; 6	6; 2
2	(El Salvador) (Guatemala)	Ingrid González; Mónica Agüero	6; 3	0; 6	7; 5
3	(El Salvador) (Guatemala)	Annette Falkenberg / Renate Wachtler; Mariola Prado / Florea de María Urrea	6; 2	2; 6	7; 5

== Ecuador vs. Bolivia ==
Ecuador
3
Santo Domingo, Dominican Republic
10 May 1996
Har-Tru clay (outdoors)

Bolivia
0

			1	2	3
1	(Ecuador) (Bolivia)	María de los Ángeles Ycaza; María Alejandra Claure	6; 1	6; 3
2	(Ecuador) (Bolivia)	María Dolores Campana; Mónica Poveda	7; 5	6; 4
3	(Ecuador) (Bolivia)	Nuria Niemes / María de los Ángeles Ycaza; Gabriela Calderón / Mónica Poveda	6; 0	6; 2

== El Salvador vs. Barbados ==
El Salvador
3
Santo Domingo, Dominican Republic
10 May 1996
Har-Tru clay (outdoors)

Barbados
0

			1	2	3
1	(El Salvador) (Barbados)	Annette Falkenberg; Donna Fields-Gibbs	6; 1	6; 4
2	(El Salvador) (Barbados)	Ingrid González; Jennifer Carter	6; 3	7; 5
3	(El Salvador) (Barbados)	Ingrid González / Renate Wachtler; Jennifer Carter / Donna Fields-Gibbs	6; 0	7; 5

== Guatemala vs. Bahamas ==
Guatemala
2
Santo Domingo, Dominican Republic
10 May 1996
Har-Tru clay (outdoors)

Bahamas
1

			1	2	3
1	(Guatemala) (The Bahamas)	Florea de María Urrea; Ann Simons	6; 2	6; 1
2	(Guatemala) (The Bahamas)	Mónica Agüero; Kim Cartwright	3; 6	6; 3	6; 3
3	(Guatemala) (The Bahamas)	Mariola Prado / Florea de María Urrea; Chris-Anne Aston / Ann Simons	1; 6	3; 6

== Ecuador vs. Guatemala ==
Ecuador
3
Santo Domingo, Dominican Republic
11 May 1996
Har-Tru clay (outdoors)

Guatemala
0

			1	2	3
1	(Ecuador) (Guatemala)	María de los Ángeles Ycaza; Florea de María Urrea	6; 1	6; 4
2	(Ecuador) (Guatemala)	María Dolores Campana; Mónica Agüero	6; 0	6; 3
3	(Ecuador) (Guatemala)	Nuria Niemes / María de los Ángeles Ycaza; Mónica Agüero / Florea de María Urrea	6; 1	6; 2

== Bolivia vs. El Salvador ==
Bolivia
3
Santo Domingo, Dominican Republic
11 May 1996
Har-Tru clay (outdoors)

El Salvador
0

			1	2	3
1	(Bolivia) (El Salvador)	Gabriela Calderón; Annette Falkenberg	6^{4} 7^{7}	6; 3	6; 4
2	(Bolivia) (El Salvador)	Mónica Poveda; Ingrid González	6; 1	6; 3
3	(Bolivia) (El Salvador)	María Alejandra Claure / Mónica Poveda; Ingrid González / Renate Wachtler	1; 6	6; 3	6; 3

== Bahamas vs. Barbados ==
Bahamas
2
Santo Domingo, Dominican Republic
11 May 1996
Har-Tru clay (outdoors)

Barbados
1

			1	2	3
1	(The Bahamas) (Barbados)	Chris-Anne Aston; Kyla Hunte	6; 4	5; 7	6; 3
2	(The Bahamas) (Barbados)	Kim Cartwright; Jennifer Carter	6; 3	6; 2
3	(The Bahamas) (Barbados)	Ann Simons / Dyphany Wilkinson; Donna Fields-Gibbs / Kyla Hunte	1; 6	6^{2} 7^{7}

== Ecuador vs. Bahamas ==
Ecuador
3
Santo Domingo, Dominican Republic
12 May 1996
Har-Tru clay (outdoors)

Bahamas
0

			1	2	3
1	(Ecuador) (The Bahamas)	Alexandra Guzmán; Ann Simons	6; 2	6; 2
2	(Ecuador) (The Bahamas)	María Dolores Campana; Kim Cartwright	6; 1	6; 1
3	(Ecuador) (The Bahamas)	Nuria Niemes / María de los Ángeles Ycaza; Chris-Anne Aston / Kim Cartwright	6; 3	6; 3

== Bolivia vs. Barbados ==
Bolivia
3
Santo Domingo, Dominican Republic
12 May 1996
Har-Tru clay (outdoors)

Barbados
0

			1	2	3
1	(Bolivia) (Barbados)	Gabriela Calderón; Kyla Hunte	4; 6	6; 1	6; 3
2	(Bolivia) (Barbados)	María Alejandra Claure; Donna Fields-Gibbs	6; 1	6; 4
3	(Bolivia) (Barbados)	María Alejandra Claure / Mónica Poveda; Jennifer Carter / Kyla Hunte	6; 1	6; 1

- Ecuador placed first in the pool, and thus advanced to Group I in 1997, where they placed third in their pool of four.

== See also ==
- Fed Cup structure
