= 2001 Fed Cup Americas Zone Group II – Pool D =

Group D of the 2001 Fed Cup Americas Zone Group II was one of four pools in the Americas Zone Group II of the 2001 Fed Cup. Three teams competed in a round robin competition, with each team being assigned to its respective play-off region.

| | (Cuba) CUB | (Guatemala) GUA | (El Salvador) ESA | (Barbados) BAR | RR; W–L | Set; W–L | Game; W–L | Standings |
| Cuba | | 3–0 | 3–0 | 3–0 | 3–0 | 18–0 | 109–25 | 1 |
| Guatemala | 0–3 | | 2–1 | 3–0 | 2–1 | 10–9 | 75–83 | 2 |
| El Salvador | 0–3 | 1–2 | | 3–0 | 1–2 | 9–10 | 74–76 | 3 |
| Barbados | 0–3 | 0–3 | 0–3 | | 0–3 | 0–18 | 35–109 | 4 |

== Cuba vs. Barbados ==
Cuba
3
St. John's, Antigua and Barbuda
15 May 2001
Laykold hard (outdoors)

Barbados
0

| | | | 1 | 2 | 3 |
|---|---|---|---|---|---|
| 1 | (Cuba) (Barbados) | Yamile Fors Guerra; Elena Branker | 6; 1 | 6; 1 |
| 2 | (Cuba) (Barbados) | Yanet Núñez Mojarena; Kyla Hunte | 6; 0 | 6; 2 |
| 3 | (Cuba) (Barbados) | Wendy Galán Domínguez / Yanet Núñez Mojarena; Anna-Lee Bryant / Kyla Hunte | 6; 0 | 6; 2 |

== Guatemala vs. El Salvador ==
Guatemala
2
St. John's, Antigua and Barbuda
15 May 2001
Laykold hard (outdoors)

El Salvador
1

| | | | 1 | 2 | 3 |
|---|---|---|---|---|---|
| 1 | (Guatemala) (El Salvador) | Mariola Prado; Ingrid González | 1; 6 | 1; 6 |
| 2 | (Guatemala) (El Salvador) | Luise-Elfride López; Claudia Argumedo | 6; 3 | 6; 3 |
| 3 | (Guatemala) (El Salvador) | Lucía Henkle Gómez / Luise-Elfride López; Claudia Argumedo / Ingrid González | 6; 2 | 1; 6 | 6; 4 |

== Cuba vs. Guatemala ==
Cuba
3
St. John's, Antigua and Barbuda
16 May 2001
Laykold hard (outdoors)

Guatemala
0

| | | | 1 | 2 | 3 |
|---|---|---|---|---|---|
| 1 | (Cuba) (Guatemala) | Yamile Fors Guerra; Lucía Henkle Gómez | 6; 4 | 6; 1 |
| 2 | (Cuba) (Guatemala) | Yanet Núñez Mojarena; Luise-Elfride López | 6; 1 | 6; 4 |
| 3 | (Cuba) (Guatemala) | Yamile Fors Guerra / Yanet Núñez Mojarena; Mariola Prado / Karen Saravia | 6; 1 | 6; 0 |

== El Salvador vs. Barbados ==
El Salvador
3
St. John's, Antigua and Barbuda
16 May 2001
Laykold hard (outdoors)

Barbados
0

| | | | 1 | 2 | 3 |
|---|---|---|---|---|---|
| 1 | (El Salvador) (Barbados) | Ingrid González; Elena Branker | 6; 0 | 6; 1 |
| 2 | (El Salvador) (Barbados) | Claudia Argumedo; Kyla Hunte | 6; 3 | 6; 4 |
| 3 | (El Salvador) (Barbados) | Ingrid González / Ana Osorio; Elena Branker / Anna-Lee Bryant | 6; 2 | 6; 2 |

== Cuba vs. El Salvador ==
Cuba
3
St. John's, Antigua and Barbuda
17 May 2001
Laykold hard (outdoors)

El Salvador
0

| | | | 1 | 2 | 3 |
|---|---|---|---|---|---|
| 1 | (Cuba) (El Salvador) | Yamile Fors Guerra; Ingrid González | 6; 1 | 6; 1 |
| 2 | (Cuba) (El Salvador) | Yanet Núñez Mojarena; Claudia Argumedo | 6; 0 | 6; 0 |
| 3 | (Cuba) (El Salvador) | Yamile Fors Guerra / Wendy Galán Domínguez; Claudia Argumedo / Ingrid González | 6; 0 | 7^{7} 6^{5} |

== Guatemala vs. Barbados ==
Guatemala
3
St. John's, Antigua and Barbuda
17 May 2001
Laykold hard (outdoors)

Barbados
0

| | | | 1 | 2 | 3 |
|---|---|---|---|---|---|
| 1 | (Guatemala) (Barbados) | Lucía Henkle Gómez; Elena Branker | 6; 1 | 6; 2 |
| 2 | (Guatemala) (Barbados) | Luise-Elfride López; Kyla Hunte | 6; 3 | 6; 2 |
| 3 | (Guatemala) (Barbados) | Mariola Prado / Karen Saravia; Kyla Hunte / Elena Branker | 6; 4 | 7; 5 |

== See also ==
- Fed Cup structure
