= 2001 Fed Cup Americas Zone Group I – Pool B =

Group B of the 2001 Fed Cup Americas Zone Group I was one of two pools in the Americas Zone Group I of the 2001 Fed Cup. Four teams competed in a round robin competition, with the top team advancing to the Group I play-off, the winner of which would advance to the bottom section of the World Group play-offs, and the bottom team being relegated down to 2002 Group II.

	(Venezuela) VEN	(Mexico) MEX	(Colombia) COL	(Uruguay) URU	(Dominican Republic) DOM	RR; W–L	Set; W–L	Game; W–L	Standings
Venezuela		1–2	2–1	3–0	3–0	3–1	19–11	145–103	1
Mexico	2–1		1–2	3–0	2–1	3–1	18–10	180–122	2
Colombia	1–2	2–1		2–1	3–0	3–1	16–9	120–87	3
Uruguay	0–3	0–3	1–2		2–1	1–3	10–20	81–150	4
Dominican Republic	0–3	1–2	0–3	1–2		0–4	7–21	82–146	5

== Venezuela vs. Colombia ==
Venezuela
2
Montevideo, Uruguay
23 April 2001
Red clay (outdoors)

Colombia
1

			1	2	3
1	(Venezuela) (Colombia)	Milagros Sequera; Romy Farah	5; 7	6; 1	6; 4
2	(Venezuela) (Colombia)	María Vento; Catalina Castaño	2; 6	3; 6
3	(Venezuela) (Colombia)	Milagros Sequera / María Vento; Catalina Castaño / Carolina Mayorga	6; 2	6; 4

== Mexico vs. Dominican Republic ==
Mexico
2
Montevideo, Uruguay
23 April 2001
Red clay (outdoors)

Dominican Republic
1

			1	2	3
1	(Mexico) (Dominican Republic)	Lourdes López; Joelle Schad	3; 6	6; 4	6; 4
2	(Mexico) (Dominican Republic)	Jessica Fernández; Glenny Cepeda	6; 1	6; 1
3	(Mexico) (Dominican Republic)	María José López Herrera / Melissa Torres Sandoval; Joelle Schad / Madeleine Sánchez	7; 5	2; 6	5; 7

== Venezuela vs. Mexico ==
Venezuela
1
Montevideo, Uruguay
24 April 2001
Red clay (outdoors)

Mexico
2

			1	2	3
1	(Venezuela) (Mexico)	Milagros Sequera; Lourdes López	1; 6	6; 3	6; 4
2	(Venezuela) (Mexico)	María Vento; Jessica Fernández	3; 6	6^{3} 7^{7}
3	(Venezuela) (Mexico)	Milagros Sequera / María Vento; Lourdes López / Melissa Torres Sandoval	5; 7	6; 1	1; 6

== Colombia vs. Uruguay ==
Colombia
2
Montevideo, Uruguay
24 April 2001
Red clay (outdoors)

Uruguay
1

			1	2	3
1	(Colombia) (Uruguay)	Romy Farah; Ana Lucía Migliarini de León	6; 1	1; 6	1; 6
2	(Colombia) (Uruguay)	Catalina Castaño; Daniela Olivera	6; 2	6; 1
3	(Colombia) (Uruguay)	Catalina Castaño / Carolina Mayorga; Ana Lucía Migliarini de León / Daniela Olivera	3; 6	6; 4	6; 1

== Venezuela vs. Dominican Republic ==
Venezuela
3
Montevideo, Uruguay
25 April 2001
Red clay (outdoors)

Dominican Republic
0

			1	2	3
1	(Venezuela) (Dominican Republic)	Milagros Sequera; Joelle Schad	6; 1	6; 3
2	(Venezuela) (Dominican Republic)	María Vento; Madeleine Sánchez	2; 6	6; 2	6; 0
3	(Venezuela) (Dominican Republic)	Milagros Sequera / María Vento; Madeleine Sánchez / Joelle Schad	6; 3	6; 2

== Mexico vs. Uruguay ==
Mexico
3
Montevideo, Uruguay
25 April 2001
Red clay (outdoors)

Uruguay
0

			1	2	3
1	(Mexico) (Uruguay)	Lourdes López; Ana Lucía Migliarini de León	6; 2	5; 7	6; 0
2	(Mexico) (Uruguay)	Jessica Fernández; Daniela Olivera	6^{1} 7^{7}	6; 3	10; 8
3	(Mexico) (Uruguay)	Lourdes López / Melissa Torres Sandoval; Virginia Sadi / Claudia Salgues	6; 1	7^{8} 6^{6}

== Mexico vs. Colombia ==
Mexico
1
Montevideo, Uruguay
26 April 2001
Red clay (outdoors)

Colombia
2

			1	2	3
1	(Mexico) (Colombia)	Lourdes López; Romy Farah	6; 2	6; 0
2	(Mexico) (Colombia)	Jessica Fernández; Catalina Castaño	0; 4			retired
3	(Mexico) (Colombia)	Lourdes López / Melissa Torres Sandoval; Catalina Castaño / Carolina Mayorga	3; 6	5; 7

== Uruguay vs. Dominican Republic ==
Uruguay
2
Montevideo, Uruguay
26 April 2001
Red clay (outdoors)

Dominican Republic
1

			1	2	3
1	(Uruguay) (Dominican Republic)	Ana Lucía Migliarini de León; Joelle Schad	4; 6	6; 1	6; 1
2	(Uruguay) (Dominican Republic)	Claudia Salgues; Madeleine Sánchez	2; 6	1; 6
3	(Uruguay) (Dominican Republic)	Virginia Sadi / Claudia Salgues; Glenny Cepeda / Madeleine Sánchez	6; 2	6; 2

== Venezuela vs. Uruguay ==
Venezuela
3
Montevideo, Uruguay
27 April 2001
Red clay (outdoors)

Uruguay
0

			1	2	3
1	(Venezuela) (Uruguay)	Milagros Sequera; Virginia Sadi	3; 6	6; 1	6; 2
2	(Venezuela) (Uruguay)	María Vento; Claudia Salgues	6; 0	6; 2
3	(Venezuela) (Uruguay)	Milagros Sequera / María Vento; Ana Lucía Migliarini de León / Virginia Sadi	6; 2	6; 3

== Colombia vs. Dominican Republic ==
Colombia
3
Montevideo, Uruguay
27 April 2001
Red clay (outdoors)

Dominican Republic
0

			1	2	3
1	(Colombia) (Dominican Republic)	Romy Farah; Daysi Espinal	6; 1	6; 3
2	(Colombia) (Dominican Republic)	Catalina Castaño; Glenny Cepeda	6; 0	6; 1
3	(Colombia) (Dominican Republic)	Catalina Castaño / Carolina Mayorga; Glenny Cepeda / Daysi Espinal	6; 1	6; 0

- Dominican Republic failed to win any ties in the pool, and thus was relegated to Group II in 2002, where they placed third in their pool of six.

== See also ==
- Fed Cup structure
