= 2001 Fed Cup Americas Zone Group I – Pool A =

Group A of the 2001 Fed Cup Americas Zone Group I was one of two pools in the Americas Zone Group I of the 2001 Fed Cup. Four teams competed in a round robin competition, with the top team advancing to the Group I play-off, the winner of which would advance to the bottom section of the World Group play-offs, and the bottom team being relegated down to 2002 Group II.

| | (Canada) CAN | (Brazil) BRA | (Paraguay) PAR | (Ecuador) ECU | RR; W–L | Set; W–L | Game; W–L | Standings |
| Canada | | 2–1 | 3–0 | 3–0 | 3–0 | 17–3 | 120–71 | 1 |
| Brazil | 1–2 | | 3–0 | 3–0 | 2–1 | 15–5 | 112–73 | 2 |
| Paraguay | 0–3 | 0–3 | | 3–0 | 1–2 | 5–13 | 73–94 | 3 |
| Ecuador | 0–3 | 0–3 | 0–3 | | 0–3 | 1–17 | 42–109 | 4 |

== Canada vs. Ecuador ==
Canada
3
Montevideo, Uruguay
24 April 2001
Red clay (outdoors)

Ecuador
0

| | | | 1 | 2 | 3 |
|---|---|---|---|---|---|
| 1 | (Canada) (Ecuador) | Sonya Jeyaseelan; Nuria Niemes | 6; 1 | 6; 0 |
| 2 | (Canada) (Ecuador) | Jana Nejedly; Candice de la Torre | 6; 4 | 6; 3 |
| 3 | (Canada) (Ecuador) | Sonya Jeyaseelan / Renata Kolbovic; Candice de la Torre / Nuria Niemes | 6; 3 | 6; 1 |

== Brazil vs. Paraguay ==
Brazil
3
Montevideo, Uruguay
24 April 2001
Red clay (outdoors)

Paraguay
0

| | | | 1 | 2 | 3 |
|---|---|---|---|---|---|
| 1 | (Brazil) (Paraguay) | Bruna Colósio; Laura Bernal | 6; 2 | 6; 1 |
| 2 | (Brazil) (Paraguay) | Joana Cortez; Larissa Schaerer | 7^{7} 6^{5} | 6; 3 |
| 3 | (Brazil) (Paraguay) | Joana Cortez / Vanessa Menga; Laura Bernal / Larissa Schaerer | 6; 0 | 6; 4 |

== Canada vs. Paraguay ==
Canada
3
Montevideo, Uruguay
25 April 2001
Red clay (outdoors)

Paraguay
0

| | | | 1 | 2 | 3 |
|---|---|---|---|---|---|
| 1 | (Canada) (Paraguay) | Sonya Jeyaseelan; Sarah Tami Masi | 6; 0 | 6; 3 |
| 2 | (Canada) (Paraguay) | Jana Nejedly; Larissa Schaerer | 7^{13} 6^{11} | 6; 2 |
| 3 | (Canada) (Paraguay) | Sonya Jeyaseelan / Renata Kolbovic; Laura Bernal / Larissa Schaerer | 7^{7} 6^{1} | 6; 3 |

== Brazil vs. Ecuador ==
Brazil
3
Montevideo, Uruguay
25 April 2001
Red clay (outdoors)

Ecuador
0

| | | | 1 | 2 | 3 |
|---|---|---|---|---|---|
| 1 | (Brazil) (Ecuador) | Vanessa Menga; Alexandra Guzmán | 6; 1 | 6; 3 |
| 2 | (Brazil) (Ecuador) | Joana Cortez; Paola Guerrero | 7; 1 | 6; 2 |
| 3 | (Brazil) (Ecuador) | Joana Cortez / Vanessa Menga; Candice de la Torre / Paola Guerrero | 6; 4 | 6; 0 |

== Canada vs. Brazil ==
Canada
2
Montevideo, Uruguay
26 April 2001
Red clay (outdoors)

Brazil
1

| | | | 1 | 2 | 3 |
|---|---|---|---|---|---|
| 1 | (Canada) (Brazil) | Sonya Jeyaseelan; Vanessa Menga | 6; 1 | 6; 2 |
| 2 | (Canada) (Brazil) | Jana Nejedly; Joana Cortez | 2; 6 | 7; 5 | 7; 9 |
| 3 | (Canada) (Brazil) | Sonya Jeyaseelan / Renata Kolbovic; Bruna Colósio / Vanessa Menga | 4; 6 | 6; 4 | 8; 6 |

== Paraguay vs. Ecuador ==
Paraguay
3
Montevideo, Uruguay
26 April 2001
Red clay (outdoors)

Ecuador
0

| | | | 1 | 2 | 3 |
|---|---|---|---|---|---|---|
| 1 | (Paraguay) (Ecuador) | Laura Bernal; Alexandra Guzmán | 6; 3 | 6; 2 |
| 2 | (Paraguay) (Ecuador) | Larissa Schaerer; Candice de la Torre | 4; 6 | 6; 2 | 6; 2 |
| 3 | (Paraguay) (Ecuador) | María Alejandra García / Sarah Tami Masi; Paola Guerrero / Alexandra Guzmán | 6; 4 | 3; 0 | | retired |

- Ecuador failed to win any ties in the pool, and thus was relegated to Group II in 2002. However, they did not compete next year.

== See also ==
- Fed Cup structure
