= 2002 Fed Cup Americas Zone =

Subsection of tennis competition

The Americas Zone was one of three zones of regional competition in the 2002 Fed Cup.

== Group I ==
- Venue: San Luis Potosí, Mexico (outdoor hard)
- Date: 23–27 April

The nine teams were divided into two pools of four and five teams. The teams that finished first in the pools played-off against those that placed second to determine which team would partake in the World Group play-offs. The two nations coming last in the pools were relegated to Group II for 2003.

=== Pools ===
	Pool A	CAN	MEX	BAH	PUR
1	Canada (3–0)		3–0	3–0	3–0
2	Mexico (2–1)	0–3		2–1	3–0
3	Bahamas (1–2)	0–3	1–2		2–1
4	Puerto Rico (0–3)	0–3	0–3	1–2	

	Pool B	COL	URU	PAR	BRA	VEN
1	Colombia (4–0)		2–1	3–0	3–0	3–0
2	Uruguay (3–1)	1–2		3–0	2–1	2–1
3	Paraguay (2–2)	0–3	0–3		2–1	2–1
4	Brazil (1–3)	0–3	1–2	1–2		3–0
5	Venezuela (0–4)	0–3	1–2	1–2	0–3	

=== Play-offs ===
A Team	Score	B Team
Canada	2–0	Uruguay
Mexico	0–2	Colombia

- Canada and Colombia advanced to 2002 World Group play-offs.
- Puerto Rico and Venezuela were relegated to Group II for 2003.

== Group II ==
- Venue: Havana, Cuba (outdoor hard)
- Date: 14–18 May

The twelve teams were divided into two pools of six. The top team from each pool then advanced to Group I for 2003.

=== Pools ===
	Pool A	ESA	DOM	BOL	CHI	PAN	BER
1	El Salvador (4–1)		3–0	1–2	3–0	3–0	3–0
2	Dominican Republic (4–1)	0–3		2–1	2–1	3–0	3–0
3	Bolivia (4–1)	2–1	1–2		3–0	3–0	3–0
4	Chile (2–3)	0–3	1–2	0–3		2–1	3–0
5	Panama (1–4)	0–3	0–3	0–3	1–2		2–1
6	Bermuda (0–5)	0–3	0–3	0–3	0–3	1–2	

	Pool B	CUB	JAM	CRC	GUA	TRI	ECA
1	Cuba (5–0)		2–1	3–0	3–0	2–1	3–0
2	Jamaica (3–2)	1–2		2–1	1–2	2–1	3–0
3	Costa Rica (3–2)	0–3	1–2		2–1	2–1	3–0
4	Guatemala (2–3)	0–3	2–1	1–2		1–2	3–0
5	Trinidad and Tobago (2–3)	1–2	1–2	1–2	2–1		2–1
6	Eastern Caribbean (0–5)	0–3	0–3	0–3	0–3	1–2	

- El Salvador and Cuba advanced to Group I in 2003.

== See also ==
- Fed Cup structure
