= 2013 Fed Cup Americas Zone Group II – Pool B =

Group B of the 2013 Fed Cup Americas Zone Group II was one of two pools in the Americas zone of the 2013 Fed Cup. Five teams competed in a round robin competition, with the teams proceeding to their respective sections of the play-offs: the top team played for advancement to the 2014 Group I.

== Standings ==
		(The Bahamas) BAH	(Uruguay) URU	(Dominican Republic) DOM	(Costa Rica) CRC	(El Salvador) ESA	(Trinidad and Tobago) TRI	RR; W–L	Match; W–L	Set; W–L	Game; W–L
60	Bahamas		3–0	2–1	3–0	3–0	2–1	13–2	26–6	178–112	1
64	Uruguay	0–3		1–2	2–1	2–1	3–0	8–7	19–17	151–139	3
75	Dominican Republic	1–2	2–1		3–0	2–1	2–1	10–5	21–14	176–136	2
79	Costa Rica	0–3	1–2	0–3		1–2	0–3	2–13	7–26	117–170	6
	El Salvador	0–3	1–2	1–2	2–1		2–1	6–9	13–17	135–145	4
	Trinidad and Tobago	1–2	0–3	1–2	3–0	1–2		6–9	12–18	116–155	5

== Round-robin ==
=== Bahamas vs. Trinidad and Tobago ===
Bahamas
2
Maya Country Club, Santa Tecla, El Salvador
16 July 2013
Red clay (outdoors)

Trinidad and Tobago
1

			1	2	3
1	(The Bahamas) (Trinidad and Tobago)	Simone Pratt; Yolande Leacock	6; 3	6; 4
2	(The Bahamas) (Trinidad and Tobago)	Kerrie Cartwright; Anneliese Rose	7; 5	6; 0
3	(The Bahamas) (Trinidad and Tobago)	Kerrie Cartwright / Simone Pratt; Anneliese Rose / Breana Stampfli	1; 6	4; 6

=== Uruguay vs. El Salvador ===
Uruguay
2
Maya Country Club, Santa Tecla, El Salvador
16 July 2013
Red clay (outdoors)

El Salvador
1

			1	2	3
1	(Uruguay) (El Salvador)	Magdalena Boado; Jennifer Paola Artiga Henríquez	7; 5	0; 6	3; 6
2	(Uruguay) (El Salvador)	Carolina de los Santos; Rosalinda Calderón Recinos	6; 1	6; 2
3	(Uruguay) (El Salvador)	Magdalena Boado / Carolina de los Santos; Rosalinda Calderón Recinos / Gabriela Chinchilla	1; 6	6; 1	6; 4

=== Dominican Republic vs. Costa Rica ===
Dominican Republic
3
Maya Country Club, Santa Tecla, El Salvador
16 July 2013
Red clay (outdoors)

Costa Rica
0

			1	2	3
1	(Dominican Republic) (Costa Rica)	Francesca Segarelli; Mariella Calderon	6; 1	6; 3
2	(Dominican Republic) (Costa Rica)	Michelle Marie Valdez; Andrea Brenes	5; 7	7; 5	6; 3
3	(Dominican Republic) (Costa Rica)	Joelle Schad / Francesca Segarelli; Juli Raventós / Laura Víquez	6; 2	6; 2

=== Bahamas vs. Uruguay ===
Bahamas
3
Maya Country Club, Santa Tecla, El Salvador
17 July 2013
Red clay (outdoors)

Uruguay
0

			1	2	3
1	(The Bahamas) (Uruguay)	Kerrie Cartwright; Carolina de los Santos	1; 6	6; 4	7; 5
2	(The Bahamas) (Uruguay)	Simone Pratt; Inés Canepa	6; 1	6; 1
3	(The Bahamas) (Uruguay)	Larikah Russell / Danielle Andrea Thompson; Magdalena Boado / Margot Mercier	6; 3	6; 3

=== Dominican Republic vs. El Salvador ===
Dominican Republic
2
Maya Country Club, Santa Tecla, El Salvador
17 July 2013
Red clay (outdoors)

El Salvador
1

			1	2	3
1	(Dominican Republic) (El Salvador)	Michelle Marie Valdez; Rosalinda Calderón Recinos	3; 6	4; 6
2	(Dominican Republic) (El Salvador)	Francesca Segarelli; Jennifer Paola Artiga Henríquez	6; 4	5; 7	6; 4
3	(Dominican Republic) (El Salvador)	Francesca Segarelli / Michelle Marie Valdez; Jennifer Paola Artiga Henríquez / Gabriela Chinchilla	6; 4	6; 3

=== Costa Rica vs. Trinidad and Tobago ===
Costa Rica
0
Maya Country Club, Santa Tecla, El Salvador
17 July 2013
Red clay (outdoors)

Trinidad and Tobago
3

			1	2	3
1	(Costa Rica) (Trinidad and Tobago)	Andrea Brenes; Anneliese Rose	2; 6	5; 7
2	(Costa Rica) (Trinidad and Tobago)	Mariella Calderon; Yolande Leacock	1; 6	2; 6
3	(Costa Rica) (Trinidad and Tobago)	Andrea Brenes / Juli Raventós; Anneliese Rose / Breana Stampfli	3; 6	6; 4	3; 6

=== Bahamas vs. Costa Rica ===
Bahamas
3
Maya Country Club, Santa Tecla, El Salvador
18 July 2013
Red clay (outdoors)

Costa Rica
0

			1	2	3
1	(The Bahamas) (Costa Rica)	Kerrie Cartwright; Juli Raventós	6; 1	6; 3
2	(The Bahamas) (Costa Rica)	Simone Pratt; Mariella Calderon	6; 1	7^{7} 6^{3}
3	(The Bahamas) (Costa Rica)	Kerrie Cartwright / Larikah Russell; Mariella Calderon / Laura Víquez	6; 0	6; 0

=== Uruguay vs. Dominican Republic ===
Uruguay
1
Maya Country Club, Santa Tecla, El Salvador
18 July 2013
Red clay (outdoors)

Dominican Republic
2

			1	2	3
1	(Uruguay) (Dominican Republic)	Carolina de los Santos; Karla Portalatín	6; 2	6; 1
2	(Uruguay) (Dominican Republic)	Magdalena Boado; Francesca Segarelli	6^{8} 7^{10}	0; 6
3	(Uruguay) (Dominican Republic)	Magdalena Boado / Carolina de los Santos; Joelle Schad / Francesca Segarelli	6; 4	4; 6	0; 6

=== El Salvador vs. Trinidad and Tobago ===
El Salvador
2
Maya Country Club, Santa Tecla, El Salvador
18 July 2013
Red clay (outdoors)

Trinidad and Tobago
1

			1	2	3
1	(El Salvador) (Trinidad and Tobago)	Rosalinda Calderón Recinos; Breana Stampfli	6; 4	6; 1
2	(El Salvador) (Trinidad and Tobago)	Jennifer Paola Artiga Henríquez; Yolande Leacock	6; 3	1; 1		retired
3	(El Salvador) (Trinidad and Tobago)	Astrid Liliana Araya Santos / Gabriela Chinchilla; Anneliese Rose / Breana Stampfli				w/o

=== Bahamas vs. El Salvador ===
Bahamas
3
Maya Country Club, Santa Tecla, El Salvador
19 July 2013
Red clay (outdoors)

El Salvador
0

			1	2	3
1	(The Bahamas) (El Salvador)	Kerrie Cartwright; Rosalinda Calderón Recinos	6; 4	6; 2
2	(The Bahamas) (El Salvador)	Simone Pratt; Jennifer Paola Artiga Henríquez	7; 5	6; 3
3	(The Bahamas) (El Salvador)	Kerrie Cartwright / Larikah Russell; Astrid Liliana Araya Santos / Jennifer Paola Artiga Henríquez	7; 5	6; 3

=== Uruguay vs. Costa Rica ===
Uruguay
2
Maya Country Club, Santa Tecla, El Salvador
19 July 2013
Red clay (outdoors)

Costa Rica
1

			1	2	3
1	(Uruguay) (Costa Rica)	Margot Mercier; Andrea Brenes	6; 0	4; 6	6; 0
2	(Uruguay) (Costa Rica)	Carolina de los Santos; Mariella Calderon	6; 1	6; 2
3	(Uruguay) (Costa Rica)	Inés Canepa / Carolina de los Santos; Andrea Brenes / Juli Raventós	3; 6	3; 6

=== Dominican Republic vs. Trinidad and Tobago ===
Dominican Republic
2
Maya Country Club, Santa Tecla, El Salvador
19 July 2013
Red clay (outdoors)

Trinidad and Tobago
1

			1	2	3
1	(Dominican Republic) (Trinidad and Tobago)	Karla Portalatín; Anneliese Rose	3; 6	4; 6
2	(Dominican Republic) (Trinidad and Tobago)	Michelle Marie Valdez; Yolande Leacock	3; 6	6; 4	6; 0
3	(Dominican Republic) (Trinidad and Tobago)	Joelle Schad / Francesca Segarelli; Breana Stampfli / Anneliese Rose	6; 1	6; 2

=== Bahamas vs. Dominican Republic ===
Bahamas
2
Maya Country Club, Santa Tecla, El Salvador
20 July 2013
Red clay (outdoors)

Dominican Republic
1

			1	2	3
1	(The Bahamas) (Dominican Republic)	Kerrie Cartwright; Michelle Marie Valdez	6; 2	7; 5
2	(The Bahamas) (Dominican Republic)	Simone Pratt; Francesca Segarelli	0; 6	5; 7
3	(The Bahamas) (Dominican Republic)	Kerrie Cartwright / Larikah Russell; Joelle Schad / Francesca Segarelli	6; 3	5; 7	6; 2

=== Uruguay vs. Trinidad and Tobago ===
Uruguay
3
Maya Country Club, Santa Tecla, El Salvador
20 July 2013
Red clay (outdoors)

Trinidad and Tobago
0

			1	2	3
1	(Uruguay) (Trinidad and Tobago)	Margot Mercier; Breana Stampfli	6; 2	4; 6	6; 4
2	(Uruguay) (Trinidad and Tobago)	Carolina de los Santos; Anneliese Rose	6; 1	6; 0
3	(Uruguay) (Trinidad and Tobago)	Magdalena Boado / Carolina de los Santos; Anneliese Rose / Breana Stampfli	6; 2	6; 2

=== Costa Rica vs. El Salvador ===
Costa Rica
1
Maya Country Club, Santa Tecla, El Salvador
20 July 2013
Red clay (outdoors)

El Salvador
2

			1	2	3
1	(Costa Rica) (El Salvador)	Andrea Brenes; Rosalinda Calderón Recinos	2; 6	5; 7
2	(Costa Rica) (El Salvador)	Mariella Calderon; Jennifer Paola Artiga Henríquez	4; 6	4; 6
3	(Costa Rica) (El Salvador)	Andrea Brenes / Juli Raventós; Astrid Liliana Araya Santos / Rosalinda Calderón Recinos	6; 3	6; 1

== See also ==
- Fed Cup structure
