= 2001 Fed Cup Americas Zone Group II – Pool C =

Group C of the 2001 Fed Cup Americas Zone Group II was one of four pools in the Americas Zone Group II of the 2001 Fed Cup. Three teams competed in a round robin competition, with each team being assigned to its respective play-off region.

| | (Costa Rica) CRC | (Bermuda) BER | (Panama) PAN | (Antigua and Barbuda) ATG | RR; W–L | Set; W–L | Game; W–L | Standings |
| Costa Rica | | 3–0 | 3–0 | 3–0 | 3–0 | 18–1 | 108–25 | 1 |
| Bermuda | 0–3 | | 3–0 | 2–1 | 2–1 | 11–10 | 92–99 | 2 |
| Panama | 0–3 | 0–3 | | 2–1 | 1–2 | 6–14 | 63–100 | 3 |
| Antigua and Barbuda | 0–3 | 1–2 | 1–2 | | 0–3 | 5–15 | 63–102 | 4 |

== Costa Rica vs. Bermuda ==
Costa Rica
3
St. John's, Antigua and Barbuda
15 May 2001
Laykold hard (outdoors)

Bermuda
0

| | | | 1 | 2 | 3 |
|---|---|---|---|---|---|
| 1 | (Costa Rica) (Bermuda) | Melissa Mendieta; Tara Lambert | 6; 0 | 6; 0 |
| 2 | (Costa Rica) (Bermuda) | Érika Villalobos Morsink; Zarah De Silva | 6; 3 | 6; 1 |
| 3 | (Costa Rica) (Bermuda) | Julia Roca Valverde / Érika Villalobos Morsink; Zarah De Silva / Tara Lambert | 6; 4 | 6; 1 |

== Panama vs. Antigua and Barbuda ==
Panama
2
St. John's, Antigua and Barbuda
15 May 2001
Laykold hard (outdoors)

Antigua and Barbuda
1

| | | | 1 | 2 | 3 |
|---|---|---|---|---|---|
| 1 | (Panama) (Antigua and Barbuda) | María Elena Gittens; Isoke Perry | 6; 1 | 6; 4 |
| 2 | (Panama) (Antigua and Barbuda) | Anais Marie Moreno; Niki Williams | 0; 6 | 1; 6 |
| 3 | (Panama) (Antigua and Barbuda) | María Elena Gittens / Alexia Llysel Márquez; Francine Harvey / Niki Williams | 6; 4 | 6; 1 |

== Costa Rica vs. Antigua and Barbuda ==
Costa Rica
3
St. John's, Antigua and Barbuda
16 May 2001
Laykold hard (outdoors)

Antigua and Barbuda
0

| | | | 1 | 2 | 3 |
|---|---|---|---|---|---|
| 1 | (Costa Rica) (Antigua and Barbuda) | Melissa Mendieta; Isoke Perry | 6; 0 | 6; 1 |
| 2 | (Costa Rica) (Antigua and Barbuda) | Érika Villalobos Morsink; Niki Williams | 6; 2 | 6; 2 |
| 3 | (Costa Rica) (Antigua and Barbuda) | Julia Roca Valverde / Érika Villalobos Morsink; Francine Harvey / Isoke Perry | 6; 0 | 6; 2 |

== Bermuda vs. Panama ==
Bermuda
3
St. John's, Antigua and Barbuda
16 May 2001
Laykold hard (outdoors)

Panama
0

| | | | 1 | 2 | 3 |
|---|---|---|---|---|---|
| 1 | (Bermuda) (Panama) | Tara Lambert; María Elena Gittens | 7; 5 | 7^{7} 6^{3} |
| 2 | (Bermuda) (Panama) | Zarah De Silva; Anais Marie Moreno | 6; 1 | 6; 3 |
| 3 | (Bermuda) (Panama) | Zarah De Silva / Sasha Fisher; María Elena Gittens / Alexia Llysel Márquez | 7^{7} 6^{3} | 3; 6 | 6; 2 |

== Costa Rica vs. Panama ==
Costa Rica
3
St. John's, Antigua and Barbuda
17 May 2001
Laykold hard (outdoors)

Panama
0

| | | | 1 | 2 | 3 |
|---|---|---|---|---|---|
| 1 | (Costa Rica) (Panama) | Melissa Mendieta; Alexia Llysel Márquez | 6; 0 | 6; 1 |
| 2 | (Costa Rica) (Panama) | Érika Villalobos Morsink; Anais Marie Moreno | 6; 0 | 6; 0 |
| 3 | (Costa Rica) (Panama) | Julia Roca Valverde / Laura Víquez; María Elena Gittens / Alexia Llysel Márquez | 0; 6 | 6; 1 | 6; 1 |

== Bermuda vs. Antigua and Barbuda ==
Bermuda
2
St. John's, Antigua and Barbuda
17 May 2001
Laykold hard (outdoors)

Antigua and Barbuda
1

| | | | 1 | 2 | 3 |
|---|---|---|---|---|---|
| 1 | (Bermuda) (Antigua and Barbuda) | Sasha Fisher; Francine Harvey | 4; 6 | 7; 5 | 7; 5 |
| 2 | (Bermuda) (Antigua and Barbuda) | Zarah De Silva; Niki Williams | 6; 4 | 4; 6 | 1; 6 |
| 3 | (Bermuda) (Antigua and Barbuda) | Tara Lambert / Shonette Wilson; Lorna-May Lewis / Niki Williams | 6; 2 | 6; 0 |

== See also ==
- Fed Cup structure
