= Canada Billie Jean King Cup team =

Canadian national women's tennis team

Canada
- Captain: Heidi El Tabakh
- ITF ranking: 1 ▲ (November 15, 2023)
- Highest ITF ranking: 1 (November 15, 2023)
- Colors: Red & White
- First year: 1963
- Years played: 55
- Ties played (W–L): 170 (101–69)
- Years in World Group: 22 (13–20)
- Titles: 1 (2023)
- Most total wins: Aleksandra Wozniak (40–12)
- Most singles wins: Aleksandra Wozniak (32–11)
- Most doubles wins: Sonya Jeyaseelan (17–2)
- Best doubles team: Sonya Jeyaseelan / Rene Simpson (6–1); Sharon Fichman / Marie-Ève Pelletier (6–3)
- Most ties played: Aleksandra Wozniak (36)
- Most years played: Jill Hetherington (14)

The Canada women's national tennis team represents Canada in the Billie Jean King Cup (previously known as the Federation Cup and the Fed Cup) tennis competition since 1963. They are overseen by Tennis Canada, the governing body of tennis in Canada.

Canada is the reigning Billie Jean King Cup champion, winning the tournament in 2023. They also reached the semifinals in 1988, and the quarterfinals on four occasions in 1964, 1967, 1987 and 2015. They have only missed one competition since the inaugural edition in 1963.

== History ==
=== 1963–1994: Appearances in the World Group quarterfinals and semifinals ===
Canada played its first tie in 1963 when the team of Ann Barclay and Louise Brown was defeated 0–3 by Great Britain in World Group first round. Canada and its team of Benita Senn, Vicki Berner and Louise Brown reached the World Group quarterfinals in 1964 with a 2–1 victory over Sweden in the second round, but was defeated 0–3 the next round by Australia. In 1967, Canada made it again to the World Group quarterfinals after beating Switzerland 2–1 in the opening round, but was defeated this time 0–3 by Germany. Team members were Susan Butt, Vicki Berner and Faye Urban.

In 1987, Canada reached the third World Group quarterfinal of its history. The team of Helen Kelesi, Carling Bassett-Seguso and Jill Hetherington defeated Netherlands 3–0 in the first round and the Soviet Union 2–1 in the second round. They were however eliminated 1–2 by Czechoslovakia. Canada had its better run to date when Rene Simpson, Helen Kelesi and Jill Hetherington helped the country reach the World Group semifinals in 1988. Canada beat South Korea 2–1 and Finland 3–0 in the first and second rounds respectively, and then Sweden 3–0 in the quarterfinals. Their run was ended by Czechoslovakia with a score of 0–3.

=== 1995–2009: Moderate success ===
In 1995, Canada had its second best result with the new World Group format when they made it to the World Group I playoffs after beating Italy 3–2 in the World Group II first round. The squad of Jana Nejedly, Patricia Hy-Boulais, Jill Hetherington and Rene Simpson were then defeated 0–5 by Japan.

In 2006, Canada earned its spot back in the World Group II when team members Aleksandra Wozniak, Stéphanie Dubois and Marie-Ève Pelletier beat Argentina 3–2 in the World Group II playoffs. They were eliminated in the first round the next year by Israel 2–3. Canada was not able to secure its place in the World Group II for the second straight year as the team was eliminated by Argentina in the World Group II playoffs later that year.

=== 2010–13: World Group II contender ===
In 2010, Canada (team members were Aleksandra Wozniak, Marie-Ève Pelletier, Valérie Tétreault and Sharon Fichman) won the World Group II playoff over Argentina by the convincing score of 5–0 and regained the World Group II.

In the World Group II first round in 2011, Rebecca Marino won the opening match over Aleksandra Krunić and Aleksandra Wozniak lost the second one to Bojana Jovanovski. The next day, Marino lost the third rubber to Jovanovski, but Wozniak tied the meeting thanks to a win over Ana Jovanović. Canada's doubles team of Sharon Fichman and Marie-Ève Pelletier was however eliminated by Jovanovski and Krunić to give the win 3–2 to Serbia. Canada then had to play a playoff to stay in the World Group II for the second straight year, but lost a close tie to Slovenia 2–3.

In 2013, Canada was promoted to the World Group II for the first time since 2011 when the team of Eugenie Bouchard, Gabriela Dabrowski, Sharon Fichman and Stéphanie Dubois beat Ukraine 3–2 in the World Group II playoffs.

=== 2014–15: Run to the World Group ===
In the first round of the World Group II in 2014, Wozniak won the first rubber over Vesna Dolonc. Bouchard then gave Canada a 2–0 lead after the first day when she beat Jovana Jakšić. In the third rubber the next day, Bouchard defeated Dolonc and secured the victory for Canada. Canadians Dabrowski and Fichman lost the doubles match to Jakšić and Stojanović to end the tie with a 3–1 score in favour of Canada. Canada next played a World Group I playoff in April against Slovakia, the first time since 2004. The first day, Wozniak upset No. 52 Jana Čepelová and Bouchard won her match over Kristína Kučová to end day one with a 2–0 lead for Canada. Bouchard then won her next match the following day over Čepelová to clinch the tie for the host country with an insurmountable 3–0 lead. The win means Canada has its place in the World Group I next year, the first time ever for the country since the introduction of the new World Group format in 1995. Slovaks Janette Husárová and Anna Karolína Schmiedlová beat the Canadian duo of Dabrowski and Fichman to close the meeting with a 3–1 score for Canada.

Canada played their 2015 World Group first round against the reigning champions and number one seed the Czech Republic at home. The team, without its two best players Bouchard and Wozniak in its ranks, lost the four matches of the meeting. Canada had to host Romania in a World Group playoff in April to stay in the World Group for the next year. Françoise Abanda surprised No. 33 Irina-Camelia Begu in the first match, her first Fed Cup win, but Bouchard was upset by Alexandra Dulgheru in the second to end day one in a 1–1 tie. Bouchard and Abanda both lost their matches the next day (to Mitu and Dulgheru respectively) to give the win to Romania. Dabrowski and Fichman defeated the Romanian doubles team of Mitu and Olaru to end the meeting with a 3–2 score in favour of Romania.

=== 2016 to present: Short relegation to the Americas Zone and return to the World Group II ===
Canada next played a World Group II first round tie at home against Belarus in February 2016, but lost the meeting by a score of 2–3. Canada then played a playoff in April 2016 to secure its place in the World Group II for the next year, but lost a fourth tie in a row with a score of 3–2 for Slovakia. They were relegated in the Americas Zone Group I for 2017, the first time since 2013.

In February 2017, the team of Bianca Andreescu, Charlotte Robillard-Millette, Katherine Sebov and Carol Zhao defeated respectively Venezuela, Bolivia and Paraguay in the Round Robin, and Chile in the promotional playoff. Canada next played in April 2017 at the World Group II play-offs against Kazakhstan. Françoise Abanda won her two singles matches over world No. 51 Yaroslava Shvedova and world No. 31 Yulia Putintseva. 16-year-old Bianca Andreescu lost her first rubber to Putintseva but defeated Shvedova in the second. The doubles team of Gabriela Dabrowski and Katherine Sebov lost the final rubber to Kamila Kerimbayeva and Galina Voskoboeva. Canada won the tie 3-2 and will be back in the World Group II in 2018.

In 2018, the team of Bianca Andreescu, Gabriela Dabrowski, Katherine Sebov and Carol Zhao lost in the first round of the World Group II first round to Romania by the score of 1–3. Zhao and Andreescu lost the two singles matches the first day, respectively to Sorana Cîrstea and Irina-Camelia Begu. The second day, Sebov was defeated by Begu and Canada's doubles team of Dabrowski and Zhao won over Ana Bogdan and Raluca Olaru. In the World Group II play-offs, Andreescu lost the first rubber in three sets to world No. 40 Lesia Tsurenko and Bouchard won her two singles matches over Kateryna Bondarenko and Tsurenko. Dabrowski lost the fourth singles match to Bondarenko, sending the tie to a decisive doubles match. The team of Andreescu and Dabrowski won over Bondarenko and Olga Savchuk to secure Canada's place in the World Group II for a second straight year.

== Current team ==
‘‘Rankings as of April 14, 2025’’

Players representing Canada in 2025
Name	Born	First	Last		Ties	Win/Loss			Rankings
Name	Born	First	Year	Tie	Ties	Sin	Dou	Tot	Sin	Dou
Rebecca Marino	December 16, 1990	2011	2025	Japan	14	5–8	2–2	7–10	107	—
Marina Stakusic	November 27, 2004	2023	2025	Japan	3	3–1	0–0	3–1	126	—
Victoria Mboko	July 18, 2006	2025	2025	Japan	1	2–0	0–0	2–0	156	—
Kayla Cross	March 21, 2005	2025	2025	Japan	1	0–0	0–1	0–1	221	181
Ariana Arseneault	June 15, 2002	2025	2025	Japan	1	0–0	0–1	0–1	—	129

== Players ==
=== Most ties played ===
#	Name	CAN career	Ties	Tot W/L
1.	**Aleksandra Wozniak**	2004–2016	36	40–12
2.	Marie-Ève Pelletier	2002–2012	30	25–16
2.	Jill Hetherington	1983–1996	30	16–20
4.	**Sharon Fichman**	2005–2021	28	24–10
5.	Sonya Jeyaseelan	1997–2003	24	29–7
5.	Rene Simpson	1988–1998	24	20–16
6.	Gabriela Dabrowski	2013–Present	23	15-12
6.	Jana Nejedly	1995–2003	23	20–6
7.	Stéphanie Dubois	2004–2013	22	23–11
8.	Patricia Hy-Boulais	1991–1998	19	14–15

=== Most singles wins ===
#	Name	CAN career	Ties	Sin W/L	Dou W/L
1.	**Aleksandra Wozniak**	2004–2016	36	32–11	8–1
2.	Jana Nejedly	1995–2003	23	19–5	1–1
3.	**Eugenie Bouchard**	2011–present	10	12–4	1–0
3.	Sonya Jeyaseelan	1997–2003	24	12–5	17–2
3.	Stéphanie Dubois	2004–2013	22	12–8	11–3
6.	Helen Kelesi	1986–1994	17	11–5	4–5
7.	Maureen Drake	2000–2003	15	10–3	6–1
7.	Carling Bassett-Seguso	1982–1987	15	10–5	2–4
7.	Marjorie Blackwood	1976–1982	18	10–7	6–4
7.	Rene Simpson	1988–1998	24	10–7	10–9
7.	Patricia Hy-Boulais	1991–1998	19	10–12	4–3

=== Most doubles wins ===
#	Name	CAN career	Ties	Dou W/L	Sin W/L
1.	Sonya Jeyaseelan	1997–2003	24	17–2	12–5
2.	Marie-Ève Pelletier	2002–2012	30	16–7	9–9
3.	Gabriela Dabrowski	2013–Present	23	15-7	0-5
3.	**Sharon Fichman**	2005–2021	28	15–7	9–3
4.	Jill Hetherington	1983–1996	30	13–15	3–5
5.	Stéphanie Dubois	2004–2013	22	11–3	12–8
6.	Rene Simpson	1988–1998	24	10–9	10–7
7.	**Aleksandra Wozniak**	2004–2019	36	8–1	32–11
8.	Renata Kolbovic	1999–2001	8	7–1	1–0
8.	Vanessa Webb	2000–2003	8	7–1	0–0
9.	Maureen Drake	2000–2003	15	6–1	10–3
9.	Marjorie Blackwood	1976–1982	18	6–4	10–7
9.	Jane O'Hara	1969–1975	18	6–6	8–8
9.	Hélène Pelletier	1981–1985	12	6–6	2–0

*Active players in bold, statistics as of September 9, 2019

== Recent performances ==
Here is the list of all match-ups since 1995, when the competition started being held in the current World Group format.

=== 1990s ===
Year	Competition	Date	Surface	Location	Opponent	Score	Result
1995	World Group II, 1st Round	22–23 Apr	Clay	Ancona (ITA)	Italy	3–2	Win
1995	World Group, relegation play-offs	22–23 Jul	Carpet (i)	Gifu (JPN)	Japan	0–5	Loss
1996	World Group II, 1st Round	27–28 Apr	Hard	Vancouver (CAN)	Czech Republic	0–3	Loss
1996	World Group II, Relegation Play-offs	13–14 Jul	Clay	Aurora (CAN)	Australia	2–3	Loss
1997	Americas Zone Group I, Round Robin	29 Apr	Clay	Bogotá (COL)	Ecuador	3–0	Win
1997	Americas Zone Group I, Round Robin	30 Apr	Clay	Bogotá (COL)	Brazil	3–0	Win
1997	Americas Zone Group I, Round Robin	2 May	Clay	Bogotá (COL)	Mexico	3–0	Win
1997	Americas Zone Group I, 1st Round	3 May	Clay	Bogotá (COL)	Peru	3–0	Win
1997	Americas Zone Group I, Final	4 May	Clay	Bogotá (COL)	Colombia	2–1	Win
1997	World Group II, Relegation Play-offs	12–13 Jul	Clay	Bratislava (SVK)	Slovakia	0–5	Loss
1998	Americas Zone Group I, Round Robin	13 Apr	Clay	Brasília (BRA)	Paraguay	1–2	Loss
1998	Americas Zone Group I, Round Robin	15 Apr	Clay	Brasília (BRA)	Uruguay	3–0	Win
1998	Americas Zone Group I, Placement Play-offs	17 Apr	Clay	Brasília (BRA)	Ecuador	3–0	Win
1998	Americas Zone Group I, Placement Play-offs	18 Apr	Clay	Brasília (BRA)	Brazil	3–0	Win
1999	Americas Zone Group I, Round Robin	14 Apr	Clay	Buenos Aires (ARG)	Chile	3–0	Win
1999	Americas Zone Group I, Round Robin	15 Apr	Clay	Buenos Aires (ARG)	Venezuela	1–2	Loss
1999	Americas Zone Group I, Round Robin	16 Apr	Clay	Buenos Aires (ARG)	Puerto Rico	3–0	Win
1999	Americas Zone Group I, Round Robin	17 Apr	Clay	Buenos Aires (ARG)	Brazil	2–1	Win

=== 2000s ===
Year	Competition	Date	Surface	Location	Opponent	Score	Result
2000	Americas Zone Group I, Round Robin	25 Apr	Clay	Florianópolis (BRA)	Chile	3–0	Win
2000	Americas Zone Group I, Round Robin	27 Apr	Clay	Florianópolis (BRA)	Uruguay	3–0	Win
2000	Americas Zone Group I, Round Robin	28 Apr	Clay	Florianópolis (BRA)	Brazil	3–0	Win
2000	Americas Zone Group I, Round Robin	29 Apr	Clay	Florianópolis (BRA)	Venezuela	2–1	Win
2000	Americas Zone Group I, Final	29 Apr	Clay	Florianópolis (BRA)	Argentina	1–2	Loss
2001	Americas Zone Group I, Round Robin	24 Apr	Clay	Montevideo (URU)	Ecuador	3–0	Win
2001	Americas Zone Group I, Round Robin	25 Apr	Clay	Montevideo (URU)	Paraguay	3–0	Win
2001	Americas Zone Group I, Round Robin	26 Apr	Clay	Montevideo (URU)	Brazil	2–1	Win
2001	Americas Zone Group I, Final	28 Apr	Clay	Montevideo (URU)	Venezuela	1–2	Loss
2002	Americas Zone Group I, Round Robin	23 Apr	Hard	San Luis Potosí (MEX)	Puerto Rico	3–0	Win
2002	Americas Zone Group I, Round Robin	24 Apr	Hard	San Luis Potosí (MEX)	Bahamas	3–0	Win
2002	Americas Zone Group I, Round Robin	25 Apr	Hard	San Luis Potosí (MEX)	Mexico	3–0	Win
2002	Americas Zone Group I, Final	27 Apr	Hard	San Luis Potosí (MEX)	Uruguay	2–0	Win
2002	World Group, relegation play-offs	20–21 Jul	Clay	Přerov (CZE)	Czech Republic	0–5	Loss
2003	Americas Zone Group I, Round Robin	23 Apr	Clay	Campinas (BRA)	Bahamas	3–0	Win
2003	Americas Zone Group I, Round Robin	24 Apr	Clay	Campinas (BRA)	Uruguay	3–0	Win
2003	Americas Zone Group I, Round Robin	25 Apr	Clay	Campinas (BRA)	Mexico	3–0	Win
2003	Americas Zone Group I, Final	26 Apr	Clay	Campinas (BRA)	El Salvador	2–0	Win
2003	World Group, relegation play-offs	19–20 Jul	Clay	Neudörfl (AUT)	Austria	1–4	Loss
2004	Americas Zone Group I, Round Robin	19 Apr	Clay	Porto Seguro (BRA)	Cuba	3–0	Win
2004	Americas Zone Group I, Round Robin	21 Apr	Clay	Porto Seguro (BRA)	Uruguay	3–0	Win
2004	Americas Zone Group I, Round Robin	22 Apr	Clay	Porto Seguro (BRA)	Brazil	2–1	Win
2004	Americas Zone Group I, Round Robin	23 Apr	Clay	Porto Seguro (BRA)	Chile	2–0	Win
2004	Americas Zone Group I, Final	24 Apr	Clay	Porto Seguro (BRA)	El Salvador	2–0	Win
2004	World Group, relegation play-offs	10–11 Jul	Clay	Dorval (CAN)	Switzerland	2–3	Loss
2005	Americas Zone Group I, Round Robin	20 Apr	Clay	Carrasco (URU)	Cuba	3–0	Win
2005	Americas Zone Group I, Round Robin	21 Apr	Clay	Porto Seguro (BRA)	Brazil	3–0	Win
2005	Americas Zone Group I, Round Robin	22 Apr	Clay	Porto Seguro (BRA)	Paraguay	3–0	Win
2005	Americas Zone Group I, Final	23 Apr	Clay	Porto Seguro (BRA)	Puerto Rico	0–2	Loss
2006	Americas Zone Group I, Round Robin	19 Apr	Clay	Medellín (COL)	Uruguay	3–0	Win
2006	Americas Zone Group I, Round Robin	20 Apr	Clay	Medellín (COL)	Chile	3–0	Win
2006	Americas Zone Group I, Round Robin	21 Apr	Clay	Medellín (COL)	Mexico	3–0	Win
2006	Americas Zone Group I, Final	22 Apr	Clay	Medellín (COL)	Brazil	3–0	Win
2006	World Group II, Relegation Play-offs	15–16 Jul	Hard	Edmonton (CAN)	Argentina	3–2	Win
2007	World Group II, 1st Round	21–22 Apr	Carpet (i)	Kamloops (CAN)	Israel	2–3	Loss
2007	World Group II, Relegation Play-offs	14–15 Jul	Clay	Córdoba (ARG)	Argentina	1–4	Loss
2008	Americas Zone Group I, Round Robin	31 Jan	Clay	Medellín (COL)	Mexico	3–0	Win
2008	Americas Zone Group I, Round Robin	1 Feb	Clay	Medellín (COL)	Colombia	1–2	Loss
2008	Americas Zone Group I, 3rd To 4th Play-offs	2 Feb	Clay	Medellín (COL)	Puerto Rico	3–0	Win
2009	Americas Zone Group I, Round Robin	5 Feb	Hard (i)	Montreal (CAN)	Bahamas	3–0	Win
2009	Americas Zone Group I, Round Robin	6 Feb	Hard (i)	Montreal (CAN)	Puerto Rico	3–0	Win
2009	Americas Zone Group I, Final	7 Feb	Hard (i)	Montreal (CAN)	Paraguay	3–0	Win
2009	World Group II, Relegation Play-offs	25–26 Apr	Clay (i)	Hasselt (BEL)	Belgium	2–3	Loss

=== 2010s ===
Year	Competition	Date	Surface	Location	Opponent	Score	Result
2010	Americas Zone Group I, Round Robin	3 Feb	Clay	Lambaré (PAR)	Cuba	3–0	Win
2010	Americas Zone Group I, Round Robin	4 Feb	Clay	Lambaré (PAR)	Puerto Rico	3–0	Win
2010	Americas Zone Group I, Round Robin	5 Feb	Clay	Lambaré (PAR)	Brazil	2–1	Win
2010	Americas Zone Group I, Final	6 Feb	Clay	Lambaré (PAR)	Colombia	2–0	Win
2010	World Group II, Relegation Play-offs	24–25 Apr	Carpet (i)	Montreal (CAN)	Argentina	5–0	Win
2011	World Group II, 1st Round	5–6 Feb	Hard (i)	Novi Sad (SRB)	Serbia	2–3	Loss
2011	World Group II, Relegation Play-offs	16–17 Apr	Clay	Koper (SLO)	Slovenia	2–3	Loss
2012	Americas Zone Group I, Round Robin	1 Feb	Clay	Curitiba (BRA)	Peru	2–1	Win
2012	Americas Zone Group I, Round Robin	2 Feb	Clay	Curitiba (BRA)	Argentina	0–3	Loss
2012	Americas Zone Group I, Round Robin	3 Feb	Clay	Curitiba (BRA)	Bahamas	3–0	Win
2012	Americas Zone Group I, 3rd To 4th Play-offs	4 Feb	Clay	Curitiba (BRA)	Paraguay	0–2	Loss
2013	Americas Zone Group I, Round Robin	6 Feb	Clay	Medellín (COL)	Peru	3–0	Win
2013	Americas Zone Group I, Round Robin	7 Feb	Clay	Medellín (COL)	Venezuela	3–0	Win
2013	Americas Zone Group I, Round Robin	8 Feb	Clay	Medellín (COL)	Colombia	2–0	Win
2013	Americas Zone Group I, Final	9 Feb	Clay	Medellín (COL)	Brazil	2–1	Win
2013	World Group II, Relegation Play-offs	20–21 Apr	Clay (i)	Kyiv (UKR)	Ukraine	3–0	Win
2014	World Group II, 1st Round	8–9 Feb	Hard (i)	Montreal (CAN)	Serbia	3–1	Win
2014	World Group, relegation play-offs	19–20 Apr	Hard (i)	Quebec City (CAN)	Slovakia	3–1	Win
2015	World Group, 1st Round	7–8 Feb	Hard (i)	Quebec City (CAN)	Czech Republic	0–4	Loss
2015	World Group, relegation play-offs	18–19 Apr	Hard (i)	Montreal (CAN)	Romania	2–3	Loss
2016	World Group II, 1st Round	6–7 Feb	Hard (i)	Quebec City (CAN)	Belarus	2–3	Loss
2016	World Group II, Relegation Play-offs	16–17 Apr	Clay (i)	Bratislava (SVK)	Slovakia	2–3	Loss
2017	Americas Zone Group I, Round Robin	7 Feb	Hard	Metepec (MEX)	Venezuela	2–1	Win
2017	Americas Zone Group I, Round Robin	8 Feb	Hard	Metepec (MEX)	Bolivia	3–0	Win
2017	Americas Zone Group I, Round Robin	9 Feb	Hard	Metepec (MEX)	Paraguay	3–0	Win
2017	Americas Zone Group I, Final	11 Feb	Hard	Metepec (MEX)	Chile	2–0	Win
2017	World Group II, Relegation Play-offs	22–23 Apr	Hard (i)	Montreal (CAN)	Kazakhstan	3–2	Win
2018	World Group II, 1st Round	10–11 Feb	Hard (i)	Cluj-Napoca (ROU)	Romania	1–3	Loss
2018	World Group II, Relegation Play-offs	21–22 Apr	Hard (i)	Montreal (CAN)	Ukraine	3–2	Win
2019	World Group II, 1st Round	9–10 Feb	Clay (i)	Den Bosch (NED)	Netherlands	4–0	Win
2019	World Group play-offs	20–21 Apr	Clay (i)	Prostějov (CZE)	Czech Republic	0–4	Loss

=== 2020s ===
Year	Competition	Date	Surface	Location	Opponent	Score	Result
2020–21	Qualifying round	7–8 Feb	Hard (i)	Biel/Bienne (SUI)	Switzerland	0–4	Loss
2020–21	Play-offs	16–17 Apr	Hard (i)	Kraljevo (SRB)	Serbia	4–0	Win
2020–21	Finals (Group A)	1 Nov	Hard (i)	Prague (CZE)	France	2–1	Win
2020–21	Finals (Group A)	2 Nov	Hard (i)	Prague (CZE)	Russia	0–3	Loss
2022	Qualifying round	15–16 Apr	Hard (i)	Vancouver (CAN)	Latvia	4–0	Win
2022	Finals (Group A)	10 Nov	Hard (i)	Glasgow (SCO)	Italy	3–0	Win
2022	Finals (Group A)	11 Nov	Hard (i)	Glasgow (SCO)	Switzerland	1–2	Loss
2023	Qualifying round	14–15 Apr	Hard (i)	Vancouver (CAN)	Belgium	3–2	Win
2023	Finals (Group C)	8 Nov	Hard (i)	Seville (ESP)	Spain	3–0	Win
2023	Finals (Group C)	9 Nov	Hard (i)	Seville (ESP)	Poland	3–0	Win
2023	Finals (Semifinals)	11 Nov	Hard (i)	Seville (ESP)	Czech Republic	2–1	Win
2023	Finals (Final)	12 Nov	Hard (i)	Seville (ESP)	Italy	2–0	Champion

== Head-to-head record ==
**Country**	**Record**	**W%**	**Hard**	**Clay**	**Grass**	**Carpet**
Brazil	12–0	100%	1–0	10–0	1–0	0–0
Uruguay	7–0	100%	1–0	6–0	0–0	0–0
Mexico	7–1	88%	1–1	6–0	0–0	0–0
Chile	6–0	100%	1–0	5–0	0–0	0–0
Puerto Rico	5–1	83%	2–0	3–1	0–0	0–0
Bahamas	4–0	100%	2–0	2–0	0–0	0–0
Paraguay	4–2	67%	2–0	2–2	0–0	0–0
Netherlands	4–3	57%	1–0	3–2	0–1	0–0
Cuba	3–0	100%	0–0	3–0	0–0	0–0
Denmark	3–0	100%	2–0	1–0	0–0	0–0
Ecuador	3–0	100%	0–0	3–0	0–0	0–0
Peru	3–0	100%	0–0	3–0	0–0	0–0
Colombia	3–1	75%	0–0	3–1	0–0	0–0
Sweden	3–1	75%	2–0	0–1	1–0	0–0
Switzerland	3–2	60%	0–0	2–1	1–0	0–1
Venezuela	3–2	60%	1–0	2–2	0–0	0–0
Argentina	3–4	43%	2–0	0–4	0–0	1–0
El Salvador	2–0	100%	0–0	2–0	0–0	0–0
Norway	2–0	100%	0–0	2–0	0–0	0–0
Ukraine	2–0	100%	1–0	1–0	0–0	0–0
**Italy**	2–1	67%	0–0	1–1	1–0	0–0
Bolivia	1–0	100%	1–0	0–0	0–0	0–0
Bulgaria	1–0	100%	0–0	1–0	0–0	0–0
Chinese Taipei	1–0	100%	0–0	1–0	0–0	0–0
Finland	1–0	100%	1–0	0–0	0–0	0–0
Greece	1–0	100%	0–0	1–0	0–0	0–0

**Country**	**Record**	**W%**	**Hard**	**Clay**	**Grass**	**Carpet**
Ireland	1–0	100%	0–0	0–0	1–0	0–0
Kazakhstan	1–0	100%	1–0	0–0	0–0	0–0
Poland	1–0	100%	0–0	1–0	0–0	0–0
South Korea	1–0	100%	1–0	0–0	0–0	0–0
Israel	1–1	50%	1–0	0–0	0–0	0–1
**South Africa**	1–1	50%	0–0	1–1	0–0	0–0
Hungary	1–2	33%	0–1	1–1	0–0	0–0
**Russia**	1–2	33%	1–1	0–1	0–0	0–0
Serbia	1–2	33%	1–1	0–1	0–0	0–0
**Slovakia**	1–2	33%	1–0	0–2	0–0	0–0
**France**	1–3	25%	0–1	1–2	0–0	0–0
Japan	1–3	25%	1–0	0–1	0–1	0–1
**Spain**	1–3	25%	1–1	0–2	0–0	0–0
Belarus	0–1	0%	0–1	0–0	0–0	0–0
New Zealand	0–1	0%	0–0	0–0	0–1	0–0
Slovenia	0–1	0%	0–0	0–1	0–0	0–0
**United States**	0–1	0%	0–0	0–1	0–0	0–0
Austria	0–2	0%	0–0	0–2	0–0	0–0
Indonesia	0–2	0%	0–1	0–0	0–1	0–0
**Belgium**	0–3	0%	0–0	0–3	0–0	0–0
Great Britain	0–3	0%	0–0	0–2	0–1	0–0
Romania	0–3	0%	0–2	0–1	0–0	0–0
**Australia**	0–4	0%	0–1	0–2	0–1	0–0
**Germany**	0–5	0%	0–1	0–3	0–1	0–0
**Czech Republic**	0–7	0%	0–5	0–2	0–0	0–0
Overall win–loss	102–70	59%	29–17	67–43	5–7	1–3

*Previous champions in bold. Teams that have been ranked No. 1 in italics. Statistics as of September 9, 2019

== See also ==
- List of Canada Fed Cup team representatives
- Billie Jean King Cup
- Canada Davis Cup team
- Canada at the Hopman Cup
- Tennis Canada
