= 2001 Fed Cup Americas Zone Group II – Pool A =

Group A of the 2001 Fed Cup Americas Zone Group II was one of four pools in the Americas Zone Group II of the 2001 Fed Cup. Three teams competed in a round robin competition, with each team being assigned to its respective play-off region.

	(Puerto Rico) PUR	(Bolivia) BOL	(Jamaica) JAM	RR; W–L	Set; W–L	Game; W–L	Standings
Puerto Rico		3–0	3–0	2–0	12–1	81–43	1
Bolivia	0–3		2–1	1–1	6–8	60–71	2
Jamaica	0–3	1–2		0–2	2–11	48–75	3

== Puerto Rico vs. Bolivia ==
Puerto Rico
3
St. John's, Antigua and Barbuda
15 May 2001
Laykold hard (outdoors)

Bolivia
0

			1	2	3
1	(Puerto Rico) (Bolivia)	Jessica Roland-Rosario; Mónica Poveda	6; 3	6; 1
2	(Puerto Rico) (Bolivia)	Mari Toró; Daniela Álvarez	7; 5	6; 1
3	(Puerto Rico) (Bolivia)	Jessica Roland-Rosario / Mari Toró; Mónica Poveda / Viviana Rivero	6^{6} 7^{8}	6; 2	6; 4

== Bolivia vs. Jamaica ==
Bolivia
2
St. John's, Antigua and Barbuda
16 May 2001
Laykold hard (outdoors)

Jamaica
1

			1	2	3
1	(Bolivia) (Jamaica)	Viviana Rivero; Alexandra Chong	6; 4	6; 1
2	(Bolivia) (Jamaica)	Daniela Álvarez; Kadija Richards	6; 2	6; 4
3	(Bolivia) (Jamaica)	Daniela Álvarez / Mónica Poveda; Kadija Richards / Tinesta Rowe	6; 4	6^{5} 7^{7}	1; 6

== Puerto Rico vs. Jamaica ==
Puerto Rico
3
St. John's, Antigua and Barbuda
17 May 2001
Laykold hard (outdoors)

Jamaica
0

			1	2	3
1	(Puerto Rico) (Jamaica)	Jessica Roland-Rosario; Tinesta Rowe	6; 2	6; 4
2	(Puerto Rico) (Jamaica)	Mari Toró; Kadija Richards	7; 5	6; 0
3	(Puerto Rico) (Jamaica)	Tania Rivera / Edna Vásquez; Alexandra Chong / Alexis Panton	6; 4	7; 5

== See also ==
- Fed Cup structure
