= 2001 Fed Cup Americas Zone Group II – Pool B =

Group B of the 2001 Fed Cup Americas Zone Group II was one of four pools in the Americas Zone Group II of the 2001 Fed Cup. Three teams competed in a round robin competition, with each team being assigned to its respective play-off region.

	(The Bahamas) BAH	(Chile) CHI	(Trinidad and Tobago) TRI	RR; W–L	Set; W–L	Game; W–L	Standings
Bahamas		2–1	3–0	2–0	10–2	68–40	1
Chile	1–2		3–0	1–1	7–4	58–41	2
Trinidad and Tobago	0–3	0–3		0–2	0–11	23–68	3

== Bahamas vs. Trinidad and Tobago ==
Bahamas
3
St. John's, Antigua and Barbuda
15 May 2001
Laykold hard (outdoors)

Trinidad and Tobago
0

			1	2	3
1	(The Bahamas) (Trinidad and Tobago)	Larikah Russell; Leeza Rooks	6; 0	6; 0
2	(The Bahamas) (Trinidad and Tobago)	Nikkita Fountain; Lisa Fung-Kee-Fung	6; 2	7; 5
3	(The Bahamas) (Trinidad and Tobago)	Nikkita Fountain / Larikah Russell; Tenille Elias / Lisa Fung-Kee-Fung	6; 4	6; 2

== Bahamas vs. Chile ==
Bahamas
2
St. John's, Antigua and Barbuda
16 May 2001
Laykold hard (outdoors)

Chile
1

			1	2	3
1	(The Bahamas) (Chile)	Larikah Russell; Carolina Aravena	6; 4	6; 2
2	(The Bahamas) (Chile)	Nikkita Fountain; Valentina Castro	1; 6	5; 7
3	(The Bahamas) (Chile)	Nikkita Fountain / Larikah Russell; Valentina Castro / Suheil Lizana	7^{7} 6^{4}	6; 2

== Chile vs. Trinidad and Tobago ==
Chile
3
St. John's, Antigua and Barbuda
17 May 2001
Laykold hard (outdoors)

Trinidad and Tobago
0

			1	2	3
1	(Chile) (Trinidad and Tobago)	Carolina Aravena; Tenille Elias	6; 2	1; 0		retired
2	(Chile) (Trinidad and Tobago)	Valentina Castro; Lisa Fung-Kee-Fung	6; 1	6; 4
3	(Chile) (Trinidad and Tobago)	Suheil Lizana / Ignacia Marín; Lisa Fung-Kee-Fung / Natasha Kelly	6; 1	6; 2

== See also ==
- Fed Cup structure
