= 2002 Fed Cup Americas Zone Group II – Pool B =

International tennis competition

Group B of the 2002 Fed Cup Americas Zone Group II was one of two pools in the Americas Zone Group II of the 2002 Fed Cup. Six teams competed in a round robin competition, with the top team advancing to Group I in 2003.

| | (Cuba) CUB | (Jamaica) JAM | (Costa Rica) CRC | (Guatemala) GUA | (Trinidad and Tobago) TRI | ECA | Match; W–L | Set; W–L | Game; W–L | Standings |
| Cuba | | 2–1 | 3–0 | 3–0 | 2–1 | 3–0 | 5–0 | 26–4 | 173–72 | 1 |
| Jamaica | 1–2 | | 2–1 | 1–2 | 2–1 | 3–0 | 3–2 | 22–13 | 181–127 | 2 |
| Costa Rica | 0–3 | 1–2 | | 2–1 | 2–1 | 3–0 | 3–2 | 15–17 | 143–149 | 3 |
| Guatemala | 0–3 | 2–1 | 1–2 | | 1–2 | 3–0 | 2–3 | 18–16 | 164–153 | 4 |
| Trinidad and Tobago | 1–2 | 1–2 | 1–2 | 2–1 | | 2–1 | 2–3 | 13–17 | 115–142 | 5 |
| Eastern Caribbean | 0–3 | 0–3 | 0–3 | 0–3 | 1–2 | | 0–5 | 2–29 | 35–180 | 6 |

== Cuba vs. Trinidad and Tobago ==
Cuba
2
Havana, Cuba
14 May 2002
Hard (outdoors)

Trinidad and Tobago
1

| | | | 1 | 2 | 3 |
|---|---|---|---|---|---|
| 1 | (Cuba) (Trinidad and Tobago) | Yamile Fors Guerra; Lisa Fung-Kee-Fung | 6; 0 | 6; 2 |
| 2 | (Cuba) (Trinidad and Tobago) | Yanet Núñez Mojarena; Anneliese Rose | 6^{4} 7^{7} | 2; 6 |
| 3 | (Cuba) (Trinidad and Tobago) | Yamile Fors Guerra / Yanet Núñez Mojarena; Lisa Fung-Kee-Fung / Anneliese Rose | 6; 2 | 6; 1 |

== Eastern Caribbean vs. Jamaica ==
0
Havana, Cuba
14 May 2002
Hard (outdoors)

Jamaica
3

| | | | 1 | 2 | 3 |
|---|---|---|---|---|---|
| 1 | (Jamaica) | Masika Williams; Kadija Richards | 0; 6 | 1; 6 |
| 2 | (Jamaica) | Sylma Phillip; Alanna Broderick | 1; 6 | 2; 6 |
| 3 | (Jamaica) | Sylma Phillip / Masika Williams; Alanna Broderick / Tinesta Rowe | 1; 6 | 0; 6 |

== Costa Rica vs. Guatemala ==
Costa Rica
2
Havana, Cuba
14 May 2002
Hard (outdoors)

Guatemala
1

| | | | 1 | 2 | 3 |
|---|---|---|---|---|---|
| 1 | (Costa Rica) (Guatemala) | Laura Víquez; Luise-Elfride López | 2; 6 | 4; 6 |
| 2 | (Costa Rica) (Guatemala) | Karla Golfin; Saira Sanchinelli | 4; 6 | 6; 2 | 6; 2 |
| 3 | (Costa Rica) (Guatemala) | Karla Golfin / Milena Leiva; Mónica Agüero / Luise-Elfride López | 6; 4 | 6^{3} 7^{7} | 6; 3 |

== Cuba vs. Guatemala ==
Cuba
3
Havana, Cuba
15 May 2002
Hard (outdoors)

Guatemala
0

| | | | 1 | 2 | 3 |
|---|---|---|---|---|---|
| 1 | (Cuba) (Guatemala) | Yamile Fors Guerra; Luise-Elfride López | 7; 5 | 6; 0 |
| 2 | (Cuba) (Guatemala) | Yanet Núñez Mojarena; Saira Sanchinelli | 6; 2 | 6; 2 |
| 3 | (Cuba) (Guatemala) | Yamile Fors Guerra / Yanet Núñez Mojarena; Mónica Agüero / Luise-Elfride López | 6; 0 | 6; 1 |

== Jamaica vs. Costa Rica ==
Jamaica
2
Havana, Cuba
15 May 2002
Hard (outdoors)

Costa Rica
1

| | | | 1 | 2 | 3 |
|---|---|---|---|---|---|
| 1 | (Jamaica) (Costa Rica) | Kadija Richards; Laura Víquez | 6; 3 | 6^{4} 7^{7} | 6; 0 |
| 2 | (Jamaica) (Costa Rica) | Alanna Broderick; Karla Golfin | 2; 6 | 6; 2 | 4; 6 |
| 3 | (Jamaica) (Costa Rica) | Alanna Broderick / Kadija Richards; Karla Golfin / Milena Leiva | 6; 3 | 6; 3 |

== Eastern Caribbean vs. Trinidad and Tobago ==
1
Havana, Cuba
15 May 2002
Hard (outdoors)

Trinidad and Tobago
2

| | | | 1 | 2 | 3 |
|---|---|---|---|---|---|
| 1 | (Trinidad and Tobago) | Lerissa Maurice; Lisa Fung-Kee-Fung | 2; 6 | 1; 6 |
| 2 | (Trinidad and Tobago) | Sylma Phillip; Anneliese Rose | 2; 6 | 0; 6 |
| 3 | (Trinidad and Tobago) | Sylma Phillip / Masika Williams; Nicole Agostini / Tenille Elias | 7; 5 | 2; 6 | 6; 1 |

== Cuba vs. Costa Rica ==
Cuba
3
Havana, Cuba
16 May 2002
Hard (outdoors)

Costa Rica
0

| | | | 1 | 2 | 3 |
|---|---|---|---|---|---|
| 1 | (Cuba) (Costa Rica) | Yamile Fors Guerra; Laura Víquez | 7; 0 | 6; 2 |
| 2 | (Cuba) (Costa Rica) | Yanet Núñez Mojarena; Karla Golfin | 6; 3 | 6; 4 |
| 3 | (Cuba) (Costa Rica) | Lumay Díaz Hernández / Elsa Serrano Eduards; Karla Golfin / Ivonne Sonderegger | 7^{7} 6^{0} | 6; 0 |

== Jamaica vs. Trinidad and Tobago ==
Jamaica
2
Havana, Cuba
16 May 2002
Hard (outdoors)

Trinidad and Tobago
1

| | | | 1 | 2 | 3 |
|---|---|---|---|---|---|
| 1 | (Jamaica) (Trinidad and Tobago) | Kadija Richards; Lisa Fung-Kee-Fung | 6; 0 | 6; 0 |
| 2 | (Jamaica) (Trinidad and Tobago) | Alanna Broderick; Anneliese Rose | 4; 6 | 7; 5 | 3; 6 |
| 3 | (Jamaica) (Trinidad and Tobago) | Alanna Broderick / Kadija Richards; Nicole Agostini / Lisa Fung-Kee-Fung | 6; 1 | 6; 1 |

== Eastern Caribbean vs. Guatemala ==
0
Havana, Cuba
16 May 2002
Hard (outdoors)

Guatemala
3

| | | | 1 | 2 | 3 |
|---|---|---|---|---|---|
| 1 | (Guatemala) | Masika Williams; Luise-Elfride López | 0; 6 | 1; 6 |
| 2 | (Guatemala) | Sylma Phillip; Saira Sanchinelli | 4; 6 | 0; 6 |
| 3 | (Guatemala) | Sylma Phillip / Masika Williams; Luise-Elfride López / Saira Sanchinelli | 2; 6 | 3; 6 |

== Eastern Caribbean vs. Cuba ==
0
Havana, Cuba
17 May 2002
Hard (outdoors)

Cuba
3

| | | | 1 | 2 | 3 |
|---|---|---|---|---|---|
| 1 | (Cuba) | Masika Williams; Yamile Fors Guerra | 0; 6 | 1; 6 |
| 2 | (Cuba) | Sylma Phillip; Yanet Núñez Mojarena | 1; 6 | 3; 6 |
| 3 | (Cuba) | Lerissa Maurice / Sylma Phillip; Lumay Díaz Hernández / Elsa Serrano Eduards | 2; 6 | 2; 6 |

== Jamaica vs. Guatemala ==
Jamaica
1
Havana, Cuba
17 May 2002
Hard (outdoors)

Guatemala
2

| | | | 1 | 2 | 3 |
|---|---|---|---|---|---|
| 1 | (Jamaica) (Guatemala) | Kadija Richards; Luise-Elfride López | 4; 6 | 7^{7} 6^{4} | 6; 8 |
| 2 | (Jamaica) (Guatemala) | Alanna Broderick; Saira Sanchinelli | 7^{7} 6^{4} | 3; 6 | 6; 8 |
| 3 | (Jamaica) (Guatemala) | Alanna Broderick / Tinesta Rowe; Mónica Agüero / Luise-Elfride López | 6; 4 | 6; 0 |

== Costa Rica vs. Trinidad and Tobago ==
Costa Rica
2
Havana, Cuba
17 May 2002
Hard (outdoors)

Trinidad and Tobago
1

| | | | 1 | 2 | 3 |
|---|---|---|---|---|---|---|
| 1 | (Costa Rica) (Trinidad and Tobago) | Laura Víquez; Nicole Agostini | 4; 1 | | | retired |
| 2 | (Costa Rica) (Trinidad and Tobago) | Karla Golfin; Anneliese Rose | 2; 6 | 4; 6 |
| 3 | (Costa Rica) (Trinidad and Tobago) | Karla Golfin / Milena Leiva; Lisa Fung-Kee-Fung / Anneliese Rose | 6; 4 | 6; 4 |

== Cuba vs. Jamaica ==
Cuba
3
Havana, Cuba
18 May 2002
Hard (outdoors)

Jamaica
0

| | | | 1 | 2 | 3 |
|---|---|---|---|---|---|
| 1 | (Cuba) (Jamaica) | Yamile Fors Guerra; Tinesta Rowe | 7; 3 | 6; 0 |
| 2 | (Cuba) (Jamaica) | Yanet Núñez Mojarena; Kadija Richards | 6; 3 | 6; 1 |
| 3 | (Cuba) (Jamaica) | Lumay Díaz Hernández / Elsa Serrano Eduards; Alanna Broderick / Tinesta Rowe | 2; 6 | 5; 7 |

== Eastern Caribbean vs. Costa Rica ==
0
Havana, Cuba
18 May 2002
Hard (outdoors)

Costa Rica
3

| | | | 1 | 2 | 3 |
|---|---|---|---|---|---|
| 1 | (Costa Rica) | Masika Williams; Laura Víquez | 1; 6 | 0; 6 |
| 2 | (Costa Rica) | Sylma Phillip; Karla Golfin | 3; 6 | 3; 6 |
| 3 | (Costa Rica) | Lerissa Maurice / Sylma Phillip; Milena Leiva / Ivonne Sonderegger | 3; 6 | 3; 6 |

== Guatemala vs. Trinidad and Tobago ==
Guatemala
1
Havana, Cuba
18 May 2002
Hard (outdoors)

Trinidad and Tobago
2

| | | | 1 | 2 | 3 |
|---|---|---|---|---|---|
| 1 | (Guatemala) (Trinidad and Tobago) | Luise-Elfride López; Lisa Fung-Kee-Fung | 6; 4 | 6; 2 |
| 2 | (Guatemala) (Trinidad and Tobago) | Saira Sanchinelli; Anneliese Rose | 3; 6 | 2; 6 |
| 3 | (Guatemala) (Trinidad and Tobago) | Mónica Agüero / Luise-Elfride López; Lisa Fung-Kee-Fung / Anneliese Rose | 2; 6 | 2; 6 |

- Cuba placed first in the pool, and thus advanced to Group I in 2003, where they placed third in their pool of four.

== See also ==
- Fed Cup structure
