= 2001 Fed Cup =

International women's tennis competition

Details
- Duration: 9 April – 11 November
- Edition: 39th

Achievements (singles)

The 2001 Fed Cup was the 39th edition of the most important competition between national teams in women's tennis.

The World Group was held at the Parque Ferial Juan Carlos I in Madrid, Spain, from 7–11 November. It was reduced from thirteen to eight teams, divided into two pools, with the winners meeting in the finals. In the final, Belgium defeated Russia, giving Belgium their first title.

== World Group play-offs ==
=== First round ===
Dates: 28–29 April

The winners of Zonal Competition from the last year (Argentina, Hungary, Japan) were randomly drawn against five teams from the 2000 World Group pools. The winners were guaranteed a spot in the World Group next year.

Venue	Surface	Home team	Score	Visiting team
Bassano del Grappa, Italy	Indoor carpet	Italy	4–1	Croatia
Tokyo, Japan	Indoor hard	Japan	1–4	Argentina
Bratislava, Slovakia	Outdoor clay	Slovakia	4–1	Hungary
Adelaide, Australia	Outdoor grass	Australia	5–0	Austria

=== Second Rounds ===
Dates: 21–22 July

The winners of the first round played off against four other teams from the 2000 World Group pools, with the winners proceeding to the World Group. The losers of the first round played off against this year's zonal competition winners, with the winners remaining in World Group for next year, and the losers proceeding to Zonal Competition for next year.

First Round	Score	Challenger
Italy	1–4	France
Argentina	4–1	Germany
Slovakia	2–3	Russia
Australia	4–1	Switzerland

First Round	Score	Zonal Competition
Croatia	4–1	Venezuela
Japan	2–3	Sweden
Hungary	3–0	Israel
Austria	3–2	Indonesia

Note: Germany, as the highest-ranked of the 2nd round losers in the ITF's Fed Cup rankings, replaced the defending champions United States in the World Group after the US withdrew citing security risks following the September 11 attacks.

== World Group ==
All ties were played at the Parque Ferial Juan Carlos I, Madrid, Spain, on indoor clay courts.

- Nations in **bold** advanced to the higher level of competition.

Pool A

1. **Russia**
2. France
3. Argentina
4. Czech Republic

Pool B

1. **Belgium**
2. Spain
3. Germany
4. Australia

=== Final ===
Russia
1
Parque Ferial Juan Carlos I, Madrid, Spain
11 November 2001
Red clay (indoors)

Belgium
2

			1	2	3
1	(Russia) (Belgium)	Nadia Petrova; **Justine Henin**	0; **6**	3; **6**
2	(Russia) (Belgium)	Elena Dementieva; **Kim Clijsters**	0; **6**	4; **6**
3	(Russia) (Belgium)	**Elena Likhovtseva / Nadia Petrova**; Els Callens / Laurence Courtois	**7**; 5	**7^{7}** 6^{2}

== Americas Zone ==
- Nations in **bold** advanced to the higher level of competition.
- Nations in italics were relegated down to a lower level of competition.

=== Group I ===
Venue: Montevideo, Uruguay (outdoor clay)

Dates: 23–28 April

Participating teams

- Brazil
- Canada
- Colombia
- Dominican Republic
- Ecuador
- Mexico
- Paraguay
- Uruguay
- **Venezuela**

=== Group II ===
Venue: St. John's, Antigua and Barbuda (outdoor hard)

Dates: 15–19 May

Participating teams

- Antigua and Barbuda
- **Bahamas**
- Barbados
- Bermuda
- Bolivia
- Chile
- Costa Rica
- Cuba
- El Salvador
- Guatemala
- Jamaica
- Panama
- **Puerto Rico**
- Trinidad and Tobago

== Asia/Oceania Zone ==
- Nations in **bold** advanced to the higher level of competition.
- Nations in italics were relegated down to a lower level of competition.

=== Group I ===
Venue: Kaohsiung, Chinese Taipei (outdoor hard)

Dates: 9–14 April

Participating teams

- China
- Chinese Taipei
- India
- **Indonesia**
- Kazakhstan
- New Zealand
- Pacific Oceania
- South Korea
- Thailand
- Uzbekistan

=== Group II ===
Venue: Kaohsiung, Chinese Taipei (outdoor hard)

Dates: 9–14 April

Participating teams

- Fiji
- **Hong Kong**
- Malaysia
- **Philippines**
- Singapore
- Sri Lanka
- Syria

== Europe/Africa Zone ==
- Nations in **bold** advanced to the higher level of competition.
- Nations in italics were relegated down to a lower level of competition.

=== Group I ===
Venue: Murcia, Spain (outdoor clay)

Dates: 24–28 April

Participating teams

- Belarus
- Bulgaria
- Denmark
- Estonia
- Great Britain
- Greece
- **Israel**
- Luxembourg
- Macedonia
- Netherlands
- Poland
- Romania
- Slovenia
- South Africa
- **Sweden**
- Ukraine
- Yugoslavia

=== Group II ===
Venue: Belek, Antalya, Turkey (outdoor clay)

Dates: 14–17 May

Participating teams

- Algeria
- Armenia
- **Bosnia and Herzegovina**
- Botswana
- Egypt
- Finland
- **Georgia**
- Ireland
- Kenya
- Latvia
- Lesotho
- Lithuania
- Malta
- Moldova
- Morocco
- **Portugal**
- Tunisia
- **Turkey**
