= Jessica Roland-Pratt =

Puerto Rican tennis player

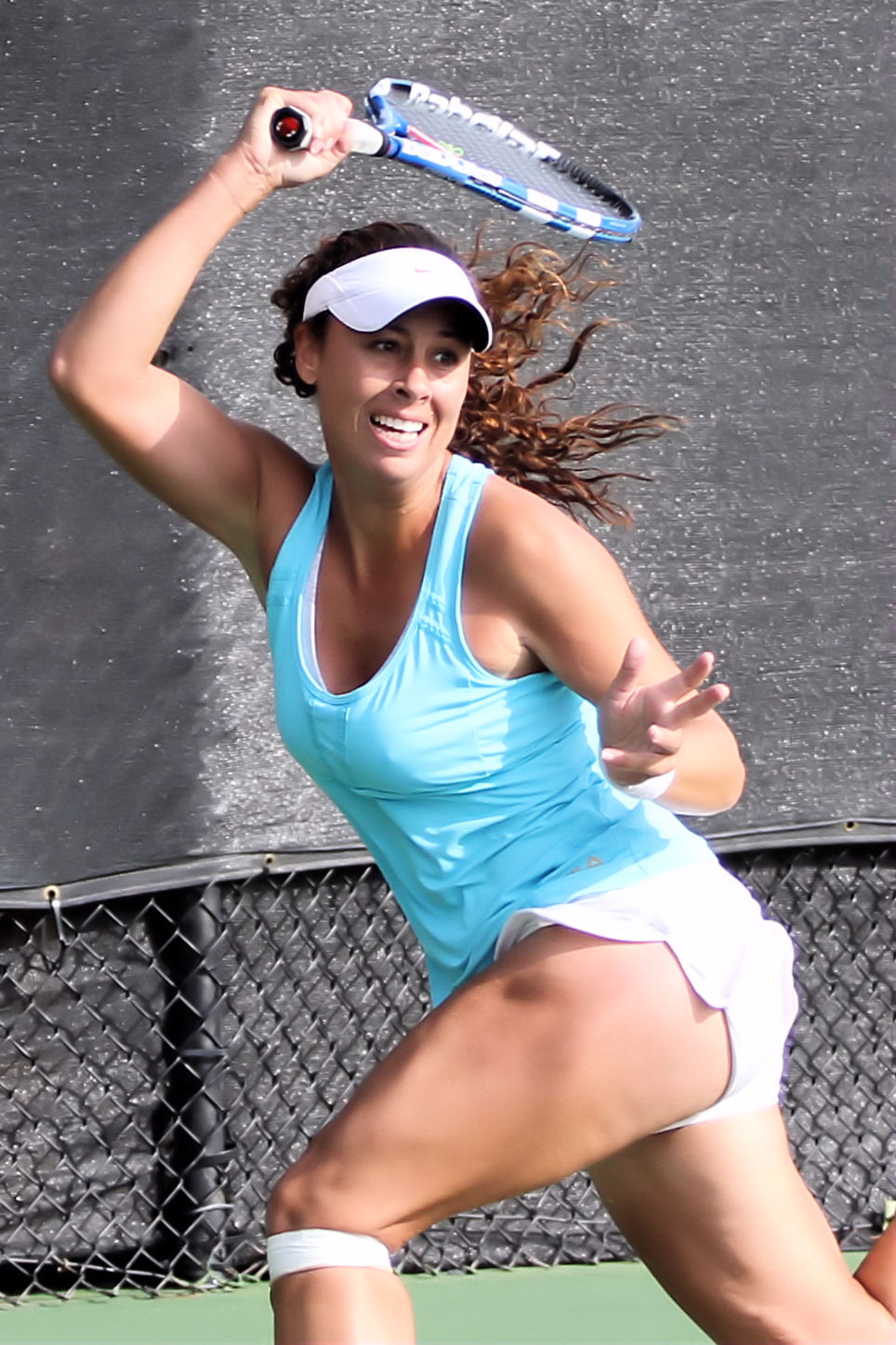
- Full name: Jessica Julia Roland-Rosario
- Country (sports): Puerto Rico
- Born: June 1, 1982 (age 43); Hollywood, California, U.S.
- Height: 5 ft 6 in (168 cm)
- Plays: Right-handed
- Prize money: $11,667

Singles
- Highest ranking: No. 635 (December 19, 2011)

Doubles
- Career titles: 3 ITF
- Highest ranking: No. 585 (June 18, 2012)

Jessica Julia Roland-Pratt (born June 1, 1982) is a former professional tennis player from Puerto Rico.

== Biography ==
Born in Hollywood, California, Roland is a graduate of Hollywood High School, where she was a two-time Los Angeles City singles champion. She is of Puerto Rican descent on her mother's side, which she chose to represent in international competition, making her first Fed Cup appearance in 2000.

From 2000 to 2004 she attended Texas A&M on a tennis scholarship, earning All-American honors in her senior year.

Roland, a right-handed player, continued to play Fed Cup tennis for Puerto Rico until 2010 and finished with 26 ties to her name, for a 16/18 overall win–loss record. At the 2010 Central American and Caribbean Games she partnered Monica Puig in the women's doubles and at the 2011 Pan American Games she was a quarter-finalist in the women's singles competition.

During her professional career, she won three $10,000 ITF doubles titles and played her last tournament in 2012.

She was previously known as Jessica Roland-Rosario.

Jessica Roland Pratt is now the Owner and Executive Director of The Tennis Place - Fit Fun Tennis Community Programs with a mission to bring organized tennis programming to public parks for all to enjoy.

== ITF finals ==
=== Singles (0–3) ===
Outcome	No.	Date	Tournament	Surface	Opponent	Score
Runner-up	1.	August 1, 2004	St. Joseph, United States	Hard	(Austria) Nicole Melch	4–6, 3–6
Runner-up	2.	June 19, 2011	Coatzacoalcos, Mexico	Hard	(United States) Noel Scott	1–6, 1–6
Runner-up	3.	June 26, 2011	Zacatecas, Mexico	Hard	(Mexico) Ana Sofía Sánchez	2–6, 6–1, 3–6

=== Doubles (3–0) ===
Outcome	No.	Date	Tournament	Surface	Partner	Opponents	Score
Winner	1.	August 1, 2004	St. Joseph, United States	Hard	(United States) Kelly Schmandt	(United States) Arpi Kojian (Austria) Nicole Melch	4–6, 6–3, 7–6^{(2)}
Winner	2.	June 13, 2011	Coatzacoalcos, Mexico	Hard	(Mexico) Carolina Betancourt	(United States) Yawna Allen (United States) Whitney Jones	6–1, 6–0
Winner	3.	July 31, 2011	St. Joseph, United States	Hard	(United States) Yawna Allen	(Poland) Paulina Bigos (United States) Erin Clark	2–6, 6–2, [10–5]
