= Ingrid González =

Salvadoran tennis player

- Full name: Ingrid González
- Country (sports): El Salvador
- Born: 13 April 1971 (age 53); El Salvador

Singles
- Career record: 19–28
- Highest ranking: 1173 (10 December 2001)

Doubles
- Career record: 14–25
- Highest ranking: 945 (28 January 2002)

Team competitions
- Fed Cup: 28–35

Ingrid González (born 13 April 1971) is a former Salvadoran tennis player.

González holds the national records for the El Salvador Fed Cup team in most wins and most ties played for her country.
