= Antigua and Barbuda Billie Jean King Cup team =

Antiguan and Barbudan women's tennis team

Antigua and Barbuda
- ITF ranking: NR
- First year: 1997
- Years played: 5
- Ties played (W–L): 25 (1–24)
- Best finish: Zonal Group I RR
- Most total wins: Niki Williams (7–32)
- Most singles wins: Niki Williams (6–16)
- Most doubles wins: Isoke Perry (1–9) / Niki Williams (1–16)
- Best doubles team: Isoke Perry / Niki Williams (1–5)
- Most ties played: Niki Williams (23)
- Most years played: Niki Williams (5) / Francine Harvey (5)

The Antigua and Barbuda Billie Jean King Cup team represents Antigua and Barbuda in Billie Jean King Cup tennis competition and are governed by the Antigua and Barbuda Tennis Association. They have not competed since 2001.

== History ==
Antigua and Barbuda competed in its first Fed Cup in 1997. They have won only one tie to date (vs. Barbados in 2001).

== See also ==
- Billie Jean King Cup
- Antigua and Barbuda Davis Cup team
