= Bermuda Billie Jean King Cup team =

Bermudian women's tennis team

Bermuda
- ITF ranking: 96 (16 November 2015)
- Colors: blue & white
- First year: 1996
- Years played: 14
- Ties played (W–L): 63 (12–51)
- Best finish: Zonal Group II RR
- Most total wins: Danielle Paynter (7–27)
- Most singles wins: Danielle Paynter (5–16)
- Most doubles wins: Jacklyn Lambert (5–10)/ Tara Lambert (5–18)
- Best doubles team: Jacklyn Lambert / Tara Lambert (3–5)
- Most ties played: Tara Lambert (26)
- Most years played: Tara Lambert (7)

The Bermuda Billie Jean King Cup team represents Bermuda in Billie Jean King Cup tennis competition and are governed by the Bermuda Lawn Tennis Association. They have not competed since 2018.

== History ==
Bermuda competed in its first Fed Cup in 1996. Their best result was finishing fifth in Group II in 2006.

== See also ==
- Billie Jean King Cup
- Bermuda Davis Cup team
