= Barbados Billie Jean King Cup team =

Barbadian women's tennis team

Barbados
- Captain: Andrew Thornton
- ITF ranking: 85 (16 November 2015)
- First year: 1993
- Years played: 12
- Ties played (W–L): 49 (5–44)
- Best finish: Zonal Group I RR
- Most total wins: Richele le Saldo (7–20)
- Most singles wins: Kiana Marshall (3–3) / Richele le Saldo (3–12)
- Most doubles wins: Kim Brandford (4–5) / Richele le Saldo (4–8)
- Best doubles team: Kim Brandford / Richele le Saldo (2–2) / Tricia-Ann Greaves / Richele le Saldo (2–5)
- Most ties played: Richele le Saldo (18)
- Most years played: Jennifer Carter (4) / Richele le Saldo (4) / Kyla Hunte (4)

The Barbados Billie Jean King Cup team represents Barbados in Billie Jean King Cup tennis competition and are governed by the Barbados Tennis Association. They currently compete in the Americas Zone of Group II.

== History ==
Barbados competed in its first Fed Cup in 1993. Their best result was finishing fifth in Group II in 1999.

== See also ==
- Billie Jean King Cup
- Barbados Davis Cup team
