= Uruguay Billie Jean King Cup team =

Uruguayan national women's tennis team

Uruguay
- Captain: Virginia Sadi
- Nations Ranking: 73 ▼4 (16 November 2015)
- Colors: blue & white
- First year: 1972
- Years played: 32
- Ties played (W–L): 120 (56-64)
- Years in World Group: 8 (1–8)
- Best finish: World Group 2R (1972, 1976)
- Most total wins: Claudia Brause (20–25)
- Most singles wins: Ana Lucía Migliarini de León (12–10)
- Most doubles wins: Claudia Brause (11–11)
- Best doubles team: Claudia Brause / María Eugenia Fernández (4–3); Claudia Brause / Patricia Miller (4–4)
- Most ties played: Ana Lucía Migliarini de León (29)
- Most years played: Claudia Brause (8); Ana Lucía Migliarini de León (8)

The Uruguay Billie Jean King Cup team represents Uruguay in the Billie Jean King Cup tennis competition and are governed by the Asociación Uruguaya de Tenis. They currently compete in the Americas Zone Group II.

== History ==
Uruguay competed in its first Fed Cup in 1972. Their best result was reaching the round of 16 in 1972 and 1976.

== See also ==
- Billie Jean King Cup
- Uruguay Davis Cup team
