= Costa Rica Billie Jean King Cup team =

Costa Rican women's tennis team

Costa Rica
- Captain: Andrea Brenes
- ITF ranking: 64 (16 November 2015)
- Colors: red & blue
- First year: 1992
- Years played: 19
- Ties played (W–L): 83 (30–53)
- Best finish: Zonal Group II RR
- Most total wins: Melissa Golfin (22–27)
- Most singles wins: Melissa Golfin (15–14)
- Most doubles wins: Paula Umaña (10–16)
- Best doubles team: Melissa Golfin / Paula Umaña (4–7)
- Most ties played: Melissa Golfin (38)
- Most years played: Melissa Golfin (9)

The Costa Rica Billie Jean King Cup team represents Costa Rica in Billie Jean King Cup tennis competition and are governed by the Federación Costarricense de Tenis. They have not competed since 2018.

== History ==
Costa Rica competed in its first Fed Cup in 1992. Their best result was finishing fourth in Group II in 2001.

== See also ==
- Billie Jean King Cup
- Costa Rica Davis Cup team
