= Bahamas Billie Jean King Cup team =

Bahamian women's tennis team

Bahamas
- Captain: Ricardo Demerite
- ITF ranking: 70 (16 November 2015)
- Colors: blue & white
- First year: 1990
- Years played: 22
- Ties played (W–L): 87 (30–57)
- Best finish: Zonal Group II RR
- Most total wins: Larika Russell (31–17)
- Most singles wins: Kerrie Cartwright (14–6) / Larika Russell (14–8)
- Most doubles wins: Larika Russell (17–6)
- Best doubles team: Nikkita Fountain / Larikah Russell (11–9)
- Most ties played: Nikkita Fountain (36)
- Most years played: Nikkita Fountain (10)

The Bahamas Billie Jean King Cup team represents the Bahamas in Billie Jean King Cup tennis competition and are governed by the Bahamas Lawn Tennis Association.

== History ==
The Bahamas competed in its first Fed Cup in 1990. Their best result was finishing third in their Group I pool in 2002.

== See also ==
- Billie Jean King Cup
- Bahamas Davis Cup team
