= El Salvador Billie Jean King Cup team =

Salvadoran women's tennis team

El Salvador
- Captain: Cesar Nolasco
- ITF ranking: 93 (16 November 2015)
- Colors: blue & white
- First year: 1992
- Years played: 14
- Ties played (W–L): 60 (28–32)
- Best finish: Zonal Group I RR
- Most total wins: Ingrid González (28–35)
- Most singles wins: Ingrid González (17–19)
- Most doubles wins: Ingrid González (11–16)
- Best doubles team: Claudia Castro / Ingrid González (4–0) Liz Cruz / Ana Osorio (4–0) Liz Cruz / Marcela Rodezno (4–3)
- Most ties played: Ingrid González (36)
- Most years played: Ingrid González (9)

The El Salvador Billie Jean King Cup team represents El Salvador in tennis Billie Jean King Cup competition and are governed by the Federación Salvadorena de Tenis. They have not competed since 2013.

== History ==
El Salvador competed in its first Fed Cup in 1992. Their best result was reaching the Group I promotion play-offs in 2003 and 2004.

== See also ==
- Billie Jean King Cup
- El Salvador Davis Cup team
