= Guillermina Grant =

Uruguayan junior tennis player (born 22-06-2002)

- Country (sports): Uruguay
- Residence: Montevideo
- Born: 22 June 2002 (age 22); Montevideo, Uruguay
- Height: 1,72m
- Plays: Right-handed (two-handed backhand)
- College: Georgia (2021-)

Singles

Grand Slam singles results
- Australian Open Junior: 1R (2020)
- French Open Junior: 1R (2020)

Doubles

Grand Slam doubles results
- Australian Open Junior: 1R (2020)
- French Open Junior: SF (2020)

Team competitions
- Fed Cup: 16–9
- Last updated on: 29 August 2022.

Guillermina Grant (born 22 June 2002) is a Uruguayan tennis player, who played at the Uruguay on the Fed Cup since 2017.

Grant has a career-high ITF juniors ranking of 31, achieved on 2 March 2020.

In December 2020, Grant signed with the Georgia Bulldogs college team for the 2021-22 season.

== ITF junior finals ==
Grand Slam
Category GA
Category G1
Category G2
Category G3
Category G4
Category G5

=== Singles (5–2) ===
Outcome	W–L	Date	Tournament	Grade	Surface	Opponent	Score
Winner	1–0	Jul 2017	Curitiba, Brazil	G5	Clay	(Brazil) Marina Figueiredo	7–5, 6–1
Winner	2–0	Dec 2017	Punta del Este, Uruguay	G5	Clay	(Portugal) Rebeca C. Silva	7–6^{(7–4)}, 6–4
Winner	3–0	Jul 2018	Montevideo, Uruguay	G5	Clay	(Argentina) Maria Florencia Urrutia	6–1, 6–0
Runner-up	3–1	Mar 2019	Mendoza, Argentina	G3	Clay	(Ecuador) Mell Reasco	3–6, 3–6
Runner-up	3–2	Sep 2019	Salvador, Brazil	G3	Hard	(Brazil) Sofia Da Cruz Mendonça	6–4, 4–6, 4–6
Winner	4–2	Sep 2019	Itajaí, Brazil	G4	Clay	(Belgium) Amelie Van Impe	6–2, 6–0
Winner	5–2	Oct 2019	Montevideo, Uruguay	G2	Clay	(Argentina) Juana Larranaga	6–2, 3–6, 6–1

=== Doubles (7–5) ===
Outcome	W–L	Date	Tournament	Grade	Surface	Partner	Opponents	Score
Winner	1–0	Sep 2017	Biel, Switzerland	G5	Clay	(Uruguay) Agustina Cuestas	(Italy) Linda Alessi (Switzerland) Katerina Tsygourova	6–4, 6–3
Winner	2–0	Dec 2017	Punta del Este, Uruguay	G5	Clay	(Russia) Anfisa Danilchenko	(Portugal) Rebeca C. Silva (Uruguay) Fernanda Secinaro	6–4, 6–4
Winner	3–0	Jul 2018	Aarhus, Denmark	G5	Clay	(Brazil) Nalanda Da Silva	(Brazil) Camilla Bossi (Peru) Daianne Hayashida	6–3, 4–6, [10–4]
Runner-up	3–1	Jul 2018	Montevideo, Uruguay	G5	Clay	(Uruguay) Belen Deus	(Argentina) Pilar Traiber (Argentina) Maria Florencia Urrutia	5–7, 1–6
Runner-up	3–2	Nov 2018	La Paz, Bolivia	G2	Clay	(Chile) Jimar Geraldine Gerald González	(Peru) Romina Ccuno (Bolivia) Paola Cortez Vargas	6–4, 5–7, [7–10]
Runner-up	3–3	Mar 2019	Mendoza, Argentina	G3	Clay	(Brazil) Nalanda Da Silva	(Ecuador) Mell Reasco (Colombia) Antonia Samudio	5–7, 5–7
Runner-up	3–4	Jun 2019	Derendingen, Switzerland	G3	Clay	(Colombia) Gabriela Macias	(United States) Rosie Garcia Gross (United States) Katja Wiersholm	6–2, 5–7, [7–10]
Winner	4–4	Oct 2019	Montevideo, Uruguay	G2	Clay	(United States) Madison Sieg	(France) Océane Babel (France) Anaëlle Leclercq	6–4, 5–7, [10–8]
Runner-up	4–5	Oct 2019	Rosario, Argentina	G2	Clay	(United States) Madison Sieg	(France) Océane Babel (France) Anaëlle Leclercq	4–6, 6–0, [7–10]
Winner	5–5	Dec 2019	Mérida, Mexico	GA	Clay	(United States) Elizabeth Coleman	(United States) Savannah Broadus (United States) Robin Montgomery	6–4, 6–2
Winner	6–5	Feb 2020	Criciúma, Brazil	GA	Clay	(Argentina) Ana Geller	(Ecuador) Mell Reasco (Argentina) Solana Sierra	6–4, 6–4
Runner-up	6–6	Feb 2020	Brasília, Brazil	B1	Clay	(Peru) Camila Soares	(Peru) Dana Guzmán (Peru) Daianne Hayashida	2–6, 2–6

== National representation ==
=== Fed Cup ===
Grant made her Fed Cup debut for Uruguay in 2017, while the team was competing in the Americas Zone Group II, when she was 15 years and 27 days old.

==== Fed Cup (16–9) ====
Group membership World Group (0–0) World Group Play-off (0–0) World Group II (0–0) World Group II Play-off (0–0) Americas Group (16–9)	Matches by surface Hard (12–5) Clay (4–4) Grass (0–0) Carpet (0–0)	Matches by type Singles (9–5) Doubles (7–4)	Matches by setting Indoors (0–0) Outdoors (16–9)

===== Singles (9–5) =====
Edition	Stage	Date	Location	Against	Surface	Opponent	W/L	Score
2017 Fed Cup; Americas Zone Group II	Pool A	19 July 2017	Panama City, Panama	Cuba	Clay	Yusleydis Smith Dias	L	6–4, 1–6, 2–6
2017 Fed Cup; Americas Zone Group II	9th-12th Playoff	22 July 2017	Panama City, Panama	Honduras	Clay	Natalie Espinal	L	5–7, 6–1, 6–7^{(5–7)}
2019 Fed Cup; Americas Zone Group II	Pool A	16 April 2019	Santo Domingo, Dominican Republic	Venezuela	Hard	Aymet Uzcátegui	L	6–4, 1–6, 4–6
2019 Fed Cup; Americas Zone Group II	Pool A	17 April 2019	Santo Domingo, Dominican Republic	Dominican Republic	Hard	Ana Julissa de Mata	W	4–6, 6–1, 6–2
2019 Fed Cup; Americas Zone Group II	Pool A	18 April 2019	Santo Domingo, Dominican Republic	Cuba	Hard	Isid Hernández	W	6–4, 6–1
2019 Fed Cup; Americas Zone Group II	Pool A	19 April 2019	Santo Domingo, Dominican Republic	Guatemala	Hard	Melissa Morales	L	5–7, 7–5, 4–6
2021 BJK Cup; Americas Zone Group II	Pool A	24 June 2021	Panama City, Panama	Costa Rica	Clay	Ariana Rahmanparast	W	6–3, 6–2
2021 BJK Cup; Americas Zone Group II	Pool A	25 June 2021	Panama City, Panama	(The Bahamas) Bahamas	Clay	Sydney Clarke	W	6–2, 6–3
2021 BJK Cup; Americas Zone Group II	Promotional playoff	26 June 2021	Panama City, Panama	Ecuador	Clay	Charlotte Römer	L	5–7, 6–3, 3–6
2022 BJK Cup; Americas Zone Group II	Pool D	25 July 2022	Santo Domingo, Dominican Republic	Barbados	Hard	Hannah Chambers	W	6–3, 6–3
2022 BJK Cup; Americas Zone Group II	Pool D	26 July 2022	Santo Domingo, Dominican Republic	Honduras	Hard	Natalie Espinal	W	7–6^{(7–3)}, 6–3
2022 BJK Cup; Americas Zone Group II	Pool D	27 July 2022	Santo Domingo, Dominican Republic	Jamaica	Hard	Junmoke James	W	6–2, 6–0
2022 BJK Cup; Americas Zone Group II	Pool D	28 July 2022	Santo Domingo, Dominican Republic	Costa Rica	Hard	Ariana Rahmanparast	W	6–0, 6–0
2022 BJK Cup; Americas Zone Group II	Promotional playoff	30 July 2022	Santo Domingo, Dominican Republic	Peru	Hard	Romina Ccuno	W	6–3, 6–3

===== Doubles (7–3) =====
Edition	Stage	Date	Location	Against	Surface	Partner	Opponents	W/L	Score
2017 Fed Cup; Americas Zone Group II	Pool A	21 July 2017	Panama City, Panama	Ecuador	Clay	Florencia Rossi	Camila Romero; Luisa Uscocovich	L	3–6, 4–6
2019 Fed Cup; Americas Zone Group II	Pool A	16 April 2019	Santo Domingo, Dominican Republic	Venezuela	Hard	Lucía de Santa Ana	Andrea Gámiz; Aymet Uzcátegui	L	1–6, 1–6
2019 Fed Cup; Americas Zone Group II	Pool A	17 April 2019	Santo Domingo, Dominican Republic	Dominican Republic	Hard	Lucía de Santa Ana	Laura Quezada; Kelly Williford	W	6–3, 1–6, 6–0
2019 Fed Cup; Americas Zone Group II	Pool A	18 April 2019	Santo Domingo, Dominican Republic	Cuba	Hard	Lucía de Santa Ana	Yoryana Delgado Herrera; Isid Hernández	W	6–0, 6–2
2019 Fed Cup; Americas Zone Group II	Pool A	19 April 2019	Santo Domingo, Dominican Republic	Guatemala	Hard	Agustina Cuestas	Rut Galindo; Gabriela Rivera	L	2–6, 6–3, 4–6
2021 BJK Cup; Americas Zone Group II	Pool A	24 June 2021	Panama City, Panama	Costa Rica	Clay	Juliana Rodríguez	Sofía Pérez; Ariana Rahmanparast	W	6–2, 6–2
2021 BJK Cup; Americas Zone Group II	Pool A	25 June 2021	Panama City, Panama	(The Bahamas) Bahamas	Clay	Juliana Rodríguez	Kerrie Cartwright; Sydney-Nicole Clarke	W	3–6, 6–3, 6–2
2022 BJK Cup; Americas Zone Group II	Pool D	25 July 2022	Santo Domingo, Dominican Republic	Barbados	Hard	Juliana Rodríguez	Hannah Chambers; Cherise Slocombe	W	6–1, 6–0
2022 BJK Cup; Americas Zone Group II	Pool D	26 July 2022	Santo Domingo, Dominican Republic	Honduras	Hard	Juliana Rodríguez	Isabella Álvarez Fu; Gabriela del Campo	W	6–1, 6–1
2022 BJK Cup; Americas Zone Group II	Pool D	28 July 2022	Santo Domingo, Dominican Republic	Costa Rica	Hard	Juliana Rodríguez	Nicole Alfaro; Ariana Rahmanparast	W	6–2, 6–2
