= Naomi Osaka career statistics =

Career finals
Discipline	Type	Won	Lost	Total
Singles	Grand Slam	4	0	4
Singles	WTA Finals	–	–	–
Singles	WTA 1000	2	3	5
Singles	WTA 500	1	3	4
Singles	WTA 250	0	1	1
Singles	Olympics	–	–	–
Singles	Total	7	7	14
Doubles	Grand Slam	–	–	–
Doubles	WTA Finals	–	–	–
Doubles	WTA 1000	–	–	–
Doubles	WTA Tour	–	–	–
Doubles	Olympics	–	–	–
Doubles	Total	–	–	–

This is a list of the main career statistics of professional tennis player Naomi Osaka. She was the champion of the 2018 US Open, 2019 Australian Open, 2020 US Open, and 2021 Australian Open.

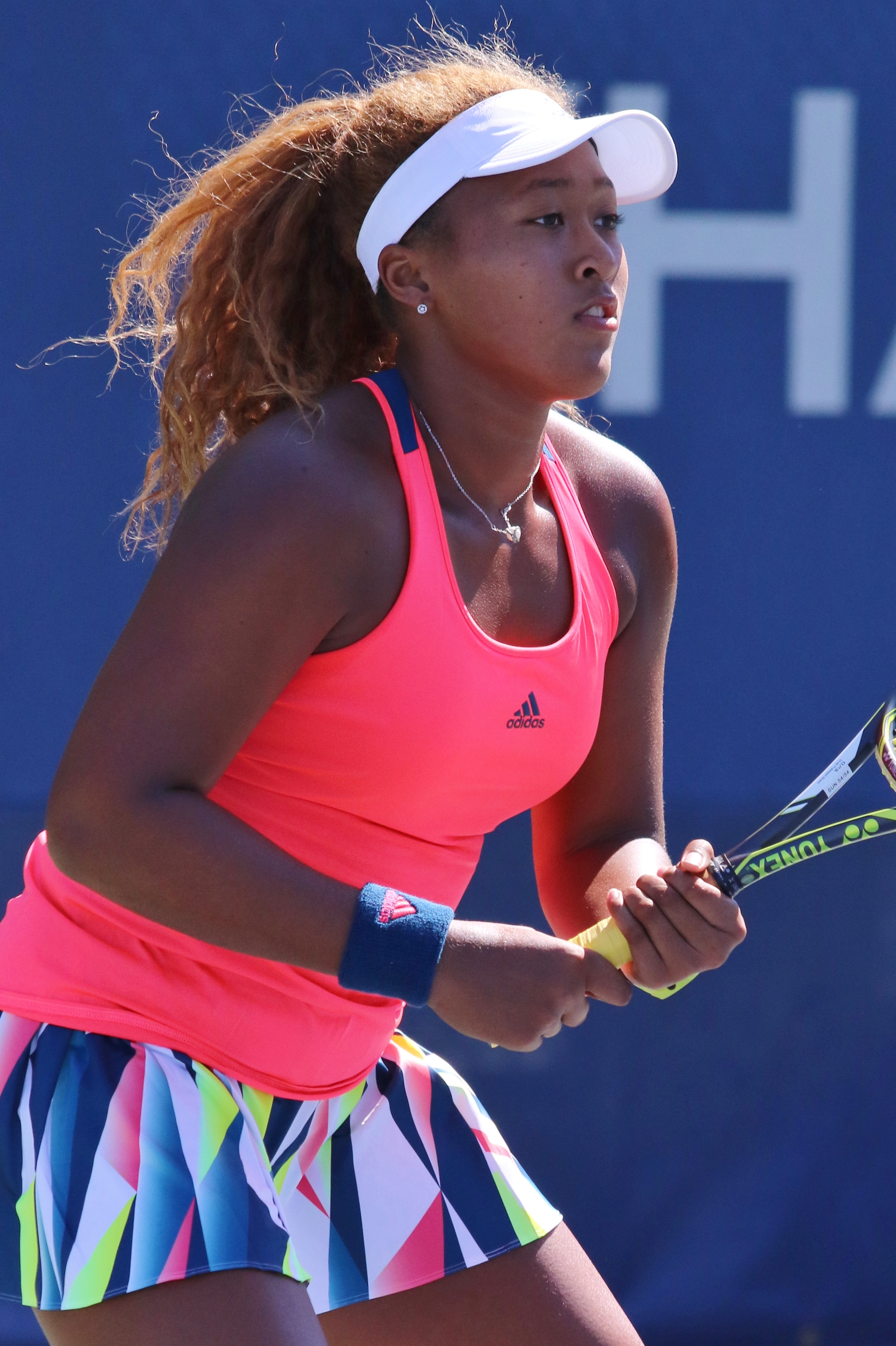
Osaka at the 2016 US Open.

== Performance timelines ==
Key
W	F	SF	QF	#R	RR	Q#	P#	DNQ	A	Z#	PO	G	S	B	NMS	NTI	P	NH

(W) winner; (F) finalist; (SF) semifinalist; (QF) quarterfinalist; (#R) rounds 4, 3, 2, 1; (RR) round-robin stage; (Q#) qualification round; (P#) preliminary round; (DNQ) did not qualify; (A) absent; (Z#) Davis/Fed Cup Zonal Group (with number indication) or (PO) play-off; (G) gold, (S) silver or (B) bronze Olympic/Paralympic medal; (NMS) not a Masters tournament; (NTI) not a Tier I tournament; (P) postponed; (NH) not held; (SR) strike rate (events won / competed); (W–L) win–loss record.
To avoid confusion and double counting, these charts are updated at the conclusion of a tournament or when the player's participation has ended.

Only main-draw results in WTA Tour, Grand Slam tournaments, Billie Jean King Cup, United Cup, Hopman Cup and Olympic Games are included in win–loss records.

=== Singles ===
Current through the 2026 Bad Homburg Open.

Tournament	2013	2014	2015	2016	2017	2018	2019	2020	2021	2022	2023	2024	2025	2026	SR	W–L	Win %
Grand Slam tournaments
Australian Open	A	A	A	3R	2R	4R	W	3R	W	3R	A	1R	3R	3R (Note: Withdrew during the tournament. Not counted as a loss.)	2 / 10	28–7	80%
French Open	A	A	A	3R	1R	3R	3R	A	2R	1R	A	2R	1R	4R	0 / 9	11–8	58%
Wimbledon	A	A	Q1	A	3R	3R	1R	NH	A	A	A	2R	3R	QF	0 / 6	11–6	65%
US Open	A	A	Q2	3R	3R	W	4R	W	3R	1R	A	2R	SF	4R	2 / 10	31–8	79%
Win–Loss	0–0	0–0	0–0	6–3	5–4	14–3	12–3	9–1	9–1	2–3	0–0	3–4	9–4	12–3	4 / 35	81–29	74%
Year-end championship
WTA Finals	Did Not Qualify					RR	RR	NH	Did Not Qualify						0 / 2	1–3	25%
National representation
Billie Jean King Cup (Note: Formerly known as Fed Cup until 2020.)	A	A	A	A	Z1	PO	A	QR		A	A	A	A		0 / 0	5–2	71%
Summer Olympics	Not Held			A	Not Held				3R	Not Held		1R	Not Held		0 / 2	2–2	50%
WTA 1000 tournaments
Qatar Open	A	A	NTI	A	NTI	2R	NTI	A	NTI	A	NTI	QF	A	A	0 / 2	3–2	60%
Dubai Championships	NTI		A	NTI	2R	NTI	2R	NTI	A	NTI	A	A	A	A	0 / 2	1–2	33%
Indian Wells Open	A	A	A	Q2	3R	W	4R	NH	A	2R	A	3R	1R	4R	1 / 7	16–6	73%
Miami Open	A	A	A	3R	2R	2R	3R	NH	QF	F	A	3R	4R	2R	0 / 9	17–9	65%
Madrid Open	A	A	A	Q2	A	1R	QF	NH	2R	2R	A	2R	1R	4R	0 / 6	6–6	50%
Italian Open	A	A	A	A	1R	2R	QF	A	2R	A	A	4R	4R	4R	0 / 6	9–6	60%
Canadian Open	A	A	A	Q1	3R	1R	QF	NH	A	1R	A	2R	F	QF	0 / 7	14–7	67%
Cincinnati Open	A	A	A	Q2	A	1R	QF	F	3R	1R	A	Q2	A	A	0 / 5	7–4	64%
China Open	A	A	A	Q1	1R	SF	W	Not Held			A	4R	2R	4R	1 / 6	15–4	79%
Wuhan Open (Note: In 2014, the Pan Pacific Open was downgraded to a Premier event and replaced by the Wuhan Open. The Premier 5 tournaments were reclassified as WTA 1000 tournaments in 2021.)	Q1	A	A	A	1R	A	A	Not Held				A	2R	A	0 / 1	1–2	0%
Career statistics
	2013	2014	2015	2016	2017	2018	2019	2020	2021	2022	2023	2024	2025	2026	Career		
Tournaments	0	2	2	13	22	20	17	4	8	11	0	16	13	11	Career total: 139		
Titles	0	0	0	0	0	2	3	1	1	0	0	0	0	0	Career total: 7		
Finals	0	0	0	1	0	3	3	2	1	1	0	0	2	1	Career total: 13		
Hard Win–Loss	0–0	2–2	0–2	18–11	12–13	29–13	30–7	16–2	16–4	12–7	0–0	12–8	21–7	15–7	7 / 93	183–82	69%
Clay Win–Loss	0–0	0–0	0–0	2–2	2–5	5–4	9–2	0–1	3–2	1–2	0–0	5–5	3–3	7–3	0 / 30	37–29	56%
Grass Win–Loss	0–0	0–0	0–0	0–0	4–4	6–3	1–2	0–0	0–0	0–0	0–0	3–3	3–3	8–2	0 / 17	25–17	60%
Overall Win–Loss	0–0	2–2	0–2	20–13	18–22	40–20	40–11	16–3	19–6	13–9	0–0	20–16	27–13	30–12	7 / 140	245–128	66%
Win %	–	50%	0%	61%	45%	67%	78%	84%	76%	59%	–	56%	68%	72%	Career total: 66%		
Year-end ranking (Note: 2012: WTA ranking–1028.)	430	250	203	40	68	5	3	3	13	42	–	59	16		$25,277,608		

=== Doubles ===
Tournament	2016	2017	...	2024	SR	W–L	Win %
Grand Slam tournaments
Australian Open	A	1R		A	0 / 1	0–1	0%
French Open	2R	A		A	0 / 1	1–1	50%
Wimbledon	A	1R			0 / 1	0–1	0%
US Open	1R	1R			0 / 2	0–2	0%
Win–Loss	1–2	0–3		0–0	0 / 5	1–5	17%
WTA 1000 tournaments
Miami Open	A	1R		A	0 / 0	0–0	–
Career statistics
Tournaments	2	5		1	Career total: 8		
Overall Win–Loss	1–2	0–5		0–1	0 / 8	1–8	11%
Win %	33%	0%		0%	Career total: 11%		
Year-end ranking	374	699					

== Grand Slam tournaments finals ==
=== Singles: 4 (4 titles) ===
Result	Year	Tournament	Surface	Opponent	Score
Win	2018	US Open	Hard	(United States) Serena Williams	6–2, 6–4
Win	2019	Australian Open	Hard	(Czech Republic) Petra Kvitová	7–6^{(7–2)}, 5–7, 6–4
Win	2020	US Open (2)	Hard	(Belarus) Victoria Azarenka	1–6, 6–3, 6–3
Win	2021	Australian Open (2)	Hard	(United States) Jennifer Brady	6–4, 6–3

== Other significant finals ==
=== WTA 1000 tournaments ===
==== Singles: 5 (2 titles, 3 runner-ups) ====
Result	Year	Tournament	Surface	Opponent	Score
Win	2018	Indian Wells Open	Hard	(Russia) Daria Kasatkina	6–3, 6–2
Win	2019	China Open	Hard	(Australia) Ashleigh Barty	3–6, 6–3, 6–2
Loss	2020	Cincinnati Open	Hard	(Belarus) Victoria Azarenka	walkover
Loss	2022	Miami Open	Hard	(Poland) Iga Świątek	4–6, 0–6
Loss	2025	Canadian Open	Hard	(Canada) Victoria Mboko	6–2, 4–6, 1–6

== WTA Tour finals ==
=== Singles: 14 (7 titles, 7 runner-ups) ===
Legend Grand Slam (4–0) Premier 5 & Premier M / WTA 1000 (2–3) Premier / WTA 500 (1–3) WTA 250 (0–1)	Finals by surface Hard (7–6) Grass (0–1)	Finals by setting Outdoor (7–6) Indoor (0–1)

Result	W–L	Date	Tournament	Tier	Surface	Opponent	Score
Loss	0–1	Sep 2016	Pan Pacific Open, Japan	Premier	Hard	(Denmark) Caroline Wozniacki	5–7, 3–6
Win	1–1	Mar 2018	Indian Wells Open, US	Premier M	Hard	(Russia) Daria Kasatkina	6–3, 6–2
Win	2–1	Sep 2018	US Open, US	Grand Slam	Hard	(United States) Serena Williams	6–2, 6–4
Loss	2–2	Sep 2018	Pan Pacific Open, Japan	Premier	Hard (i)	(Czech Republic) Karolína Plíšková	4–6, 4–6
Win	3–2	Jan 2019	Australian Open, Australia	Grand Slam	Hard	(Czech Republic) Petra Kvitová	7–6^{(7–2)}, 5–7, 6–4
Win	4–2	Sep 2019	Pan Pacific Open, Japan	Premier	Hard	(Russia) Anastasia Pavlyuchenkova	6–2, 6–3
Win	5–2	Oct 2019	China Open, China	Premier M	Hard	(Australia) Ashleigh Barty	3–6, 6–3, 6–2
Loss	5–3	Aug 2020	Cincinnati Open, US	Premier 5	Hard	(Belarus) Victoria Azarenka	walkover
Win	6–3	Sep 2020	US Open, US (2)	Grand Slam	Hard	(Belarus) Victoria Azarenka	1–6, 6–3, 6–3
Win	7–3	Feb 2021	Australian Open, Australia (2)	Grand Slam	Hard	(United States) Jennifer Brady	6–4, 6–3
Loss	7–4	Apr 2022	Miami Open, US	WTA 1000	Hard	(Poland) Iga Świątek	4–6, 0–6
Loss	7–5	Jan 2025	Auckland Open, New Zealand	WTA 250	Hard	(Denmark) Clara Tauson	6–4, ret.
Loss	7–6	Aug 2025	Canadian Open, Canada	WTA 1000	Hard	(Canada) Victoria Mboko	6–2, 4–6, 1–6
Loss	7–7	Jun 2026	Bad Homburg Open, Germany	WTA 500	Grass	(Czech Republic) Karolína Muchová	1–6, 0–1 ret.

== WTA 125 finals ==
=== Singles: 2 (1 title, 1 runner-up) ===
Result	W–L	Date	Tournament	Surface	Opponent	Score
Loss	0–1	Nov 2015	Hua Hin Challenger, Thailand	Hard (i)	(Kazakhstan) Yaroslava Shvedova	4–6, 7–6^{(10–8)}, 4–6
Win	1–1	May 2025	Open de Saint-Malo, France	Clay	(Slovenia) Kaja Juvan	6–1, 7–5

== ITF Circuit finals ==
=== Singles: 4 (4 runner-ups) ===
Legend $75,000 tournaments (0–1) $50,000 tournaments (0–1) $25,000 tournaments (0–2)	Finals by surface Hard (0–3) Grass (0–1)

Result	W–L	Date	Tournament	Tier	Surface	Opponent	Score
Loss	0–1	Jun 2013	ITF El Paso, United States	25,000	Hard	(United States) Sanaz Marand	4–6, 4–6
Loss	0–2	Mar 2014	ITF Irapuato, Mexico	25,000	Hard	(Netherlands) Indy de Vroome	6–3, 4–6, 1–6
Loss	0–3	May 2015	Kangaroo Cup Gifu, Japan	75,000	Hard	(China) Zheng Saisai	6–3, 5–7, 4–6
Loss	0–4	Jun 2015	Surbiton Trophy, United Kingdom	50,000	Grass	(Russia) Vitalia Diatchenko	6–7^{(5–7)}, 0–6

== WTA Tour career earnings ==
Current as of 26 August 2024

Year	Grand Slam singles titles	WTA singles titles	Total singles titles	Earnings ($)	Money list rank
2014	0	0	0	22,166	319
2015	0	0	0	45,820	248
2016	0	0	0	548,680	62
2017	0	0	0	593,912	56
2018	1	1	2	6,394,289	2
2019	1	2	3	6,788,282	3
2020	1	0	1	3,352,755	2
2021	1	0	1	2,306,222	8
2022	0	0	0	1,100,796	30
2024	0	0	0	869,911	65
Career	4	3	7	22,047,163	20

== Career Grand Slam tournament seedings ==
The tournaments won by Naomi Osaka are in boldface.

Legend (slams won / times seeded) seeded No. 1 (0 / 2) seeded No. 2 (0 / 2) seeded No. 3 (**1** / 3) seeded No. 4–10 (**2** / 2) seeded No. 11–32 (**1** / 8) unseeded/WC (0 / 17)	Longest streak 1 1 1 1 4 7

Year	Australian Open	French Open	Wimbledon	US Open
2015	did not play	did not play	did not play	did not play
2016	not seeded	not seeded	did not play	not seeded
2017	not seeded	not seeded	not seeded	not seeded
2018	not seeded	21st	18th	**20th (1)**
2019	**4th (2)**	1st	2nd	1st
2020	3rd	did not play	cancelled	**4th (3)**
2021	**3rd (4)**	2nd	did not play	3rd
2022	13th	not seeded	did not play	not seeded
2023	did not play	did not play	did not play	did not play
2024	not seeded	not seeded	not seeded	not seeded
2025	not seeded	not seeded	not seeded	23rd
2026	16th	16th	14th	

== Wins against top 10 players ==
- Osaka has a 15–34 record against players who were, at the time the match was played, ranked in the top 10.

Season	2017	2018	2019	2020	2021	2022	2023	2024	2025	2026	Total
Wins	2	3	6	1	0	0	0	1	1	1	15

No.	Player	Rk	Event	Surface	Rd	Score	Rk	Years	Ref
1.	(Germany) Angelique Kerber	6	US Open, United States	Hard	1R	6–3, 6–1	45	2017	
2.	(United States) Venus Williams	5	Hong Kong Open, China	Hard	2R	7–5, 6–2	64	2017	
3.	(Czech Republic) Karolína Plíšková	5	Indian Wells Open, United States	Hard	QF	6–2, 6–3	44	2018	
4.	(Romania) Simona Halep	1	Indian Wells Open, United States	Hard	SF	6–3, 6–0	44	2018	
5.	(Germany) Julia Görges	10	China Open, China	Hard	3R	6–1, 6–2	6	2018	
6.	(Ukraine) Elina Svitolina	7	Australian Open, Australia	Hard	QF	6–4, 6–1	4	2019	
7.	(Czech Republic) Karolína Plíšková	8	Australian Open, Australia	Hard	SF	6–2, 4–6, 6–4	4	2019	
8.	(Czech Republic) Petra Kvitová	6	Australian Open, Australia	Hard	F	7–6^{(7–2)}, 5–7, 6–4	4	2019	
9.	(Canada) Bianca Andreescu	6	China Open, China	Hard	QF	5–7, 6–3, 6–4	4	2019	
10.	(Australia) Ashleigh Barty	1	China Open, China	Hard	F	3–6, 6–3, 6–2	4	2019	
11.	(Czech Republic) Petra Kvitová	6	WTA Finals, China	Hard (i)	RR	7–6^{(7–1)}, 4–6, 6–4	3	2019	
12.	(Netherlands) Kiki Bertens	9	Brisbane International, Australia	Hard	QF	6–3, 3–6, 6–3	4	2020	
13.	(Latvia) Jeļena Ostapenko	10	US Open, United States	Hard	1R	6–3, 6–2	88	2024	
14.	(United States) Coco Gauff	3	US Open, United States	Hard	4R	6–3, 6–2	23	2025	
15.	Aryna Sabalenka	1	Wimbledon, United Kingdom	Grass	4R	6–2, 7–6^{(7–2)}	14	2026	

- Key: (Rk) first use, opponent rank; (Rd) round; (Rk) 2nd use, player rank; (Ref) reference; (F) final; (SF) semifinal; (QF) quarterfinal; (#R) rounds 4, 3, 2, 1; (RR) round-robin stage; (Q#) qualifying rounds or stages (3), 2, 1.

== Double bagel matches (6–0, 6–0) ==
Result	Year	No.	Tournament	Tier	Surface	Opponent	Rk	Rd	Rk
Win	2013	1.	ITF Rock Hill, U.S.	25,000	Hard	(United States) Gail Falkenberg	–	Q1	501
Win	2018	2.	US Open	Grand Slam	Hard	(Belarus) Aliaksandra Sasnovich	33	3R	19

== National and international representation ==
=== Fed Cup: 6 (5–1) ===
Group membership World Group 2 Play-off (1–1) Asia/Oceania Group (4–0)	Matches by surface Hard (5–1)	Matches by type Singles (5–1)	Matches by setting Indoors (5–1)

==== Singles: 6 (5 victories, 1 defeat) ====
Edition	Stage	Date	Location	Against	Surface	Opponent	W/L	Score
2017	Z1 RR	8 Feb 2017	Astana (KAZ)	India	Hard (i)	Karman Thandi	W	6–2, 6–2
2017	Z1 RR	9 Feb 2017	Astana (KAZ)	Philippines	Hard (i)	Khim Iglupas	W	6–2, 6–1
2017	Z1 RR	10 Feb 2017	Astana (KAZ)	China	Hard (i)	Zhang Kailin	W	1–6, 6–2, 6–3
2017	Z1 P/O	11 Feb 2017	Astana (KAZ)	Kazakhstan	Hard (i)	Galina Voskoboeva	W	4–6, 6–1, 6–2
2018	WG2 P/O	21 Apr 2018	Miki (JPN)	(United Kingdom) Great Britain	Hard (i)	Heather Watson	W	6–2, 6–3
2018	WG2 P/O	22 Apr 2018	Miki (JPN)	(United Kingdom) Great Britain	Hard (i)	Johanna Konta	L	3–6, 3–6

== Longest winning streaks ==
=== 23 match win streak (2020–21) ===
#	Tournament	Category	Start date	Surface	Rd	Opponent	Rank	Score
–	Billie Jean King Cup	Billie Jean King Cup	7 February 2020	Clay	QR	(Spain) Sara Sorribes Tormo	No. 78	0–6, 3–6
1	Cincinnati Open	Premier 5	24 August 2020	Hard	2R	(Czech Republic) Karolína Muchová	No. 26	6–7^{(5–7)}, 6–4, 6–2
2	Cincinnati Open	Premier 5	24 August 2020	Hard	3R	(Ukraine) Dayana Yastremska (16)	No. 25	6–3, 6–1
3	Cincinnati Open	Premier 5	24 August 2020	Hard	QF	(Estonia) Anett Kontaveit (12)	No. 20	4–6, 6–2, 7–5
4	Cincinnati Open	Premier 5	24 August 2020	Hard	SF	(Belgium) Elise Mertens (14)	No. 22	6–2, 7–6^{(7–5)}
–	Cincinnati Open	Premier 5	24 August 2020	Hard	F	(Belarus) Victoria Azarenka	No. 59	w/o
5	US Open	Grand Slam	31 August 2020	Hard	1R	(Japan) Misaki Doi	No. 81	6–2, 5–7, 6–2
6	US Open	Grand Slam	31 August 2020	Hard	2R	(Italy) Camila Giorgi	No. 74	6–1, 6–2
7	US Open	Grand Slam	31 August 2020	Hard	3R	(Ukraine) Marta Kostyuk	No. 137	6–3, 6–7^{(4–7)}, 6–2
8	US Open	Grand Slam	31 August 2020	Hard	4R	(Estonia) Anett Kontaveit (14)	No. 21	6–3, 6–4
9	US Open	Grand Slam	31 August 2020	Hard	QF	(United States) Shelby Rogers	No. 93	6–3, 6–4
10	US Open	Grand Slam	31 August 2020	Hard	SF	(United States) Jennifer Brady (28)	No. 41	7–6^{(7–1)}, 3–6, 6–3
11	US Open	Grand Slam	31 August 2020	Hard	F	(Belarus) Victoria Azarenka	No. 27	1–6, 6–3, 6–3
12	Gippsland Trophy	WTA 500	31 January 2021	Hard	2R	(France) Alizé Cornet	No. 53	6–2, 6–2
13	Gippsland Trophy	WTA 500	31 January 2021	Hard	3R	(United Kingdom) Katie Boulter (PR)	No. 371	3–6, 6–3, 6–1
14	Gippsland Trophy	WTA 500	31 January 2021	Hard	QF	(Romania) Irina-Camelia Begu	No. 79	7–5, 6–1
–	Gippsland Trophy	WTA 500	31 January 2021	Hard	SF	(Belgium) Elise Mertens (7)	No. 20	w/o
15	Australian Open	Grand Slam	8 February 2021	Hard	1R	(Russia) Anastasia Pavlyuchenkova	No. 39	6–1, 6–2
16	Australian Open	Grand Slam	8 February 2021	Hard	2R	(France) Caroline Garcia	No. 43	6–2, 6–3
17	Australian Open	Grand Slam	8 February 2021	Hard	3R	(Tunisia) Ons Jabeur (27)	No. 30	6–3, 6–2
18	Australian Open	Grand Slam	8 February 2021	Hard	4R	(Spain) Garbiñe Muguruza (14)	No. 14	4–6, 6–4, 7–5
19	Australian Open	Grand Slam	8 February 2021	Hard	QF	(Chinese Taipei) Hsieh Su-wei	No. 71	6–2, 6–2
20	Australian Open	Grand Slam	8 February 2021	Hard	SF	(United States) Serena Williams (10)	No. 11	6–3, 6–4
21	Australian Open	Grand Slam	8 February 2021	Hard	F	(United States) Jennifer Brady (22)	No. 24	6–4, 6–3
22	Miami Open	WTA 1000	23 March 2021	Hard	2R	(Australia) Ajla Tomljanović	No. 77	7–6^{(7–3)}, 6–4
–	Miami Open	WTA 1000	23 March 2021	Hard	3R	(Serbia) Nina Stojanović (Q)	No. 95	w/o
23	Miami Open	WTA 1000	23 March 2021	Hard	4R	(Belgium) Elise Mertens (16)	No. 17	6–3, 6–3
–	Miami Open	WTA 1000	23 March 2021	Hard	QF	(Greece) Maria Sakkari (23)	No. 25	0–6, 4–6
