= 2017 Fed Cup Asia/Oceania Zone Group I – Pool A =

Subsection of tennis competition

Pool A of the 2017 Fed Cup Asia/Oceania Zone Group I was one of two pools in the Asia/Oceania zone of the 2017 Fed Cup. Three teams competed in a round robin competition, with the top team and the bottom team proceeding to their respective sections of the play-offs: the top team played for advancement to the World Group II Play-offs, while the bottom team faced potential relegation to Group II.

== Standings ==
		THA	KAZ	KOR	RR; W–L	Set; W–L	Game; W–L	Standings
25	Thailand		0–3	0–3	0–2	1–12 (8%)	36–78 (32%)	3
27	Kazakhstan	3–0		2–1	2–0	10–2 (83%)	69–38 (64%)	1
40	South Korea	3–0	1–2		1–1	8–5 (62%)	66–55 (55%)	2

Standings are determined by: 1. number of wins; 2. number of matches; 3. in two-team ties, head-to-head records; 4. in three-team ties, (a) percentage of sets won (head-to-head records if two teams remain tied), then (b) percentage of games won (head-to-head records if two teams remain tied), then (c) Fed Cup rankings.

== Round-robin ==
=== Kazakhstan vs. South Korea ===
Kazakhstan
2
Daulet National Tennis Centre, Astana, Kazakhstan
8 February 2017
Hard (indoors)

South Korea
1

			1	2	3
1	(Kazakhstan) (South Korea)	Galina Voskoboeva; Han Na-lae	7; 5	6; 1
2	(Kazakhstan) (South Korea)	Yaroslava Shvedova; Jang Su-jeong	5; 7	2; 6
3	(Kazakhstan) (South Korea)	Yaroslava Shvedova / Galina Voskoboeva; Han Na-lae / Kim Na-ri	6; 2	6; 4

=== Thailand vs. South Korea ===
Thailand
0
Daulet National Tennis Centre, Astana, Kazakhstan
9 February 2017
Hard (indoors)

South Korea
3

			1	2	3
1	(Thailand) (South Korea)	Peangtarn Plipuech; Kim Na-ri	4; 6	3; 6
2	(Thailand) (South Korea)	Luksika Kumkhum; Jang Su-jeong	7; 5	2; 6	2; 6
3	(Thailand) (South Korea)	Nicha Lertpitaksinchai / Peangtarn Plipuech; Han Na-lae / Kim Na-ri	2; 6	3; 6

=== Thailand vs. Kazakhstan ===
Thailand
0
Daulet National Tennis Centre, Astana, Kazakhstan
10 February 2017
Hard (indoors)

Kazakhstan
3

			1	2	3
1	(Thailand) (Kazakhstan)	Nicha Lertpitaksinchai; Galina Voskoboeva	1; 6	1; 6
2	(Thailand) (Kazakhstan)	Luksika Kumkhum; Yulia Putintseva	1; 6	3; 6
3	(Thailand) (Kazakhstan)	Kamonwan Buayam / Peangtarn Plipuech; Kamila Kerimbayeva / Yaroslava Shvedova	2; 6	5; 7
