= 2016 Fed Cup Americas Zone Group II – Pool A =

Group A of the 2016 Fed Cup Americas Zone Group II was one of two pools in the Americas zone of the 2016 Fed Cup. Four teams competed in a round robin competition, with the top two teams proceeding to the play-offs where they played for promotion to Group I.

== Standings ==
		(Venezuela) VEN	(Chile) CHI	(Costa Rica) CRC	(Honduras) HON	RR; W–L	Match; W–L	Set; W–L	Game; W–L
45	Venezuela		2–1	3–0	3–0	3–0	16–3	105–54	1
57	Chile	1–2		3–0	2–1	2–1	10–6	92–55	2
62	Costa Rica	0–3	0–3		1–2	0–3	3–13	60–101	4
100	Honduras	0–3	1–2	2–1		1–2	4–13	49–98	3

== Round-robin ==
=== Venezuela vs. Costa Rica ===
Venezuela
3
Centro de Tenis Honda, Bayamón, Puerto Rico
3 February 2016
Hard (outdoor)

Costa Rica
0

			1	2	3
1	(Venezuela) (Costa Rica)	Aymet Uzcátegui; Mariela Calderón	6; 4	6; 1
2	(Venezuela) (Costa Rica)	Andrea Gámiz; Camila Quesada	6; 1	6; 3
3	(Venezuela) (Costa Rica)	Maria Gabriela Linares de Faría / Luicelena Pérez; Mariela Calderón / Camila Quesada	6; 4	7^{7} 6^{5}

=== Chile vs. Honduras ===
Chile
2
Centro de Tenis Honda, Bayamón, Puerto Rico
3 February 2016
Hard (outdoor)

Honduras
1

			1	2	3
1	(Chile) (Honduras)	Andrea Koch Benvenuto; Natalie Gabriela Espinal Sánchez	6; 0	6; 0
2	(Chile) (Honduras)	Daniela Seguel; Alejandra Obando	6; 0	6; 0
3	(Chile) (Honduras)	Bárbara Gatica / Ivania Martinich; Daniela Obando / Ana Gabriela Zavala Mata	2; 6	5; 7

=== Venezuela vs. Chile ===
Venezuela
2
Centro de Tenis Honda, Bayamón, Puerto Rico
4 February 2016
Hard (outdoor)

Chile
1

			1	2	3
1	(Venezuela) (Chile)	Aymet Uzcátegui; Andrea Koch Benvenuto	2; 6	3; 6
2	(Venezuela) (Chile)	Andrea Gámiz; Daniela Seguel	6; 1	6; 3
3	(Venezuela) (Chile)	Andrea Gámiz / Aymet Uzcátegui; Andrea Koch Benvenuto / Daniela Seguel	6; 3	3; 6	6; 2

=== Costa Rica vs. Honduras ===
Costa Rica
1
Centro de Tenis Honda, Bayamón, Puerto Rico
4 February 2016
Hard (outdoor)

Honduras
2

			1	2	3
1	(Costa Rica) (Honduras)	Mariela Calderón; Alejandra Obando	4; 6	1; 6
2	(Costa Rica) (Honduras)	Camila Quesada; Natalie Gabriela Espinal Sánchez	6; 3	6; 1
3	(Costa Rica) (Honduras)	Mariela Calderón / Camila Quesada; Alejandra Obando / Ana Gabriela Zavala Mata	4; 6	6; 0	4; 6

=== Venezuela vs. Honduras ===
Venezuela
3
Centro de Tenis Honda, Bayamón, Puerto Rico
5 February 2016
Hard (outdoor)

Honduras
0

			1	2	3
1	(Venezuela) (Honduras)	Aymet Uzcátegui; Ana Gabriela Zavala Mata	6; 0	6; 0
2	(Venezuela) (Honduras)	Andrea Gámiz; Alejandra Obando	6; 1	6; 0
3	(Venezuela) (Honduras)	María Gabriela Linares de Faría / Luicelena Pérez; Natalie Gabriela Espinal Sánchez / Alejandra Obando	6; 3	6; 4

=== Chile vs. Costa Rica ===
Chile
3
Centro de Tenis Honda, Bayamón, Puerto Rico
5 February 2016
Hard (outdoor)

Costa Rica
0

			1	2	3
1	(Chile) (Costa Rica)	Andrea Koch Benvenuto; Mariela Calderón	6; 3	6; 2
2	(Chile) (Costa Rica)	Daniela Seguel; Eugenia Camacho	6; 1	6; 1
3	(Chile) (Costa Rica)	Bárbara Gatica / Ivania Martinich; Eugenia Camacho / Camila Quesada	6; 2	6; 1
