= 2017 Fed Cup Americas Zone Group I – play-offs =

Tennis sports

The play-offs of the 2017 Fed Cup Americas Zone Group I were the final stages of the Group I Zonal Competition involving teams from the Americas. Using the positions determined in their pools, the nine teams faced off to determine their placing in the 2017 Fed Cup Americas Zone Group I. The winner of the promotion play-off advanced to World Group II play-offs, and the losers of the relegation play-off were relegated down to the Americas Zone Group II.

== Pool results ==
Placing	Pool A	Pool B
1	Canada	Chile
2	Paraguay	Argentina
3	—	Colombia
4	Venezuela	Brazil
5	Bolivia	Mexico

== Promotion play-off ==
The first placed teams of the two pools were drawn in head-to-head rounds. The winner advanced to the World Group II play-offs.

=== Canada vs. Chile ===
Canada
2
Club Deportivo la Asunción, Metepec, Mexico
11 February 2016
Hard

Chile
0

			1	2	3
1	(Canada) (Chile)	Katherine Sebov; Bárbara Gatica	6; 2	6; 2
2	(Canada) (Chile)	Bianca Andreescu; Daniela Seguel	6; 1	6; 3
3	(Canada) (Chile)	Bianca Andreescu / Charlotte Robillard-Millette; Bárbara Gatica / Daniela Seguel				not played

== Third place play-off ==
The runner-up teams of the two pools were drawn in head-to-head to determine the third and fourth placings.

=== Paraguay vs. Argentina ===
Paraguay
2
Club Deportivo la Asunción, Metepec, Mexico
11 February 2016
Hard

Argentina
0

			1	2	3
1	(Paraguay) (Argentina)	Montserrat González; María Irigoyen	6; 3	6; 4
2	(Paraguay) (Argentina)	Verónica Cepede Royg; Guadalupe Pérez Rojas	6; 4	6; 0
3	(Paraguay) (Argentina)	Verónica Cepede Royg / Montserrat González; María Irigoyen / Guadalupe Pérez Rojas				not played

== Relegation play-offs ==
The bottom two teams of the two pools were drawn in head-to-head. The loser was relegated down to Americas Zone Group II in 2018.

=== Venezuela vs. Mexico ===
Venezuela
2
Club Deportivo la Asunción, Metepec, Mexico
11 February 2016
Hard

Mexico
0

			1	2	3
1	(Venezuela) (Mexico)	Adriana Pérez; Giuliana Olmos	4; 6	6; 4	6; 2
2	(Venezuela) (Mexico)	Andrea Gámiz; Renata Zarazúa	6; 3	7; 5
3	(Venezuela) (Mexico)	Andrea Gámiz / Adriana Pérez; Giuliana Olmos / Renata Zarazúa				not played

=== Bolivia vs. Brazil ===
Bolivia
0
Club Deportivo la Asunción, Metepec, Mexico
11 February 2016
Hard

Brazil
2

			1	2	3
1	(Bolivia) (Brazil)	María Fernanda Álvarez Terán; Luisa Stefani	4; 6	7^{7} 6^{0}	6^{3} 7^{7}
2	(Bolivia) (Brazil)	Noelia Zeballos; Gabriela Cé	3; 6	3; 6
3	(Bolivia) (Brazil)	María Fernanda Álvarez Terán / Noelia Zeballos; Gabriela Cé / Luisa Stefani				not played

== Final placements ==
Placing	Teams	
Promoted	Canada	
Second	Chile	
Third	Paraguay	
Fourth	Argentina	
Fifth	Colombia	
Sixth	Venezuela	Brazil
Relegated	Mexico	Bolivia

- Canada advanced to World Group II play-offs.
- Mexico and Bolivia were relegated to Americas Zone Group II in 2018.
