= 2017 Fed Cup Americas Zone Group II – play-offs =

Subsection of tennis competition

The play-offs of the 2017 Fed Cup Americas Zone Group II were the final stages of the Group II Zonal Competition involving teams from the Americas. Using the positions determined in their pools, the thirteen teams faced off to determine their placing in the 2017 Fed Cup Americas Zone Group II. The top two teams advanced to Group I in 2018.

== Pool results ==
Placing	Pool A	Pool B	Pool C	Pool D
1	Ecuador	Guatemala	Puerto Rico	Peru
2	Cuba	Dominican Republic	Trinidad and Tobago	Costa Rica
3	Uruguay	Barbados	Honduras	Bahamas
4	—			Panama

== Promotional play-offs ==
The first placed teams of the four pools were drawn in head-to-head rounds. The winners advanced to Group I.

=== Ecuador vs. Puerto Rico ===
Ecuador
0
Centro de Alto Rendimiento Fred Maduro, Panama City, Panama
22 July 2017
Clay

Puerto Rico
2

			1	2	3
1	(Ecuador) (Puerto Rico)	Luisa Uscocovich; Mónica Matías	5; 7	1; 6
2	(Ecuador) (Puerto Rico)	Camila Romero; Monica Puig	0; 6	3; 6
3	(Ecuador) (Puerto Rico)	Camila Romero / Luisa Uscocovich; Mónica Matías / Monica Puig				not played

=== Guatemala vs. Peru ===
Guatemala
2
Centro de Alto Rendimiento Fred Maduro, Panama City, Panama
22–23 July 2017
Clay

Peru
1

			1	2	3
1	(Guatemala) (Peru)	Melissa Morales; Ferny Ángeles Paz	2; 6	6; 4	7^{7} 6^{3}
2	(Guatemala) (Peru)	Andrea Weedon; Dominique Schaefer	3; 6	1; 6
3	(Guatemala) (Peru)	Melissa Morales / Daniela Schippers; Anastasia Iamachkine / Dominique Schaefer	6; 2	7; 5

== Fifth to Eighth place play-offs ==
The second placed teams of the four pools were drawn in head-to-head rounds to determine the 5th to 8th placings.

=== Cuba vs. Trinidad and Tobago ===
Cuba
2
Centro de Alto Rendimiento Fred Maduro, Panama City, Panama
22 July 2017
Clay

Trinidad and Tobago
1

			1	2	3
1	(Cuba) (Trinidad and Tobago)	Yusleydis Smith Dias; Shenelle Mohammed	6; 0	6; 2
2	(Cuba) (Trinidad and Tobago)	Isid Hernández; Breana Stampfli	2; 6	2; 6
3	(Cuba) (Trinidad and Tobago)	Yamile Fors Guerra / Yusleydis Smith Dias; Anneliese Rose / Breana Stampfli	6; 3	6; 1

=== Dominican Republic vs. Costa Rica ===
Dominican Republic
1
Centro de Alto Rendimiento Fred Maduro, Panama City, Panama
22 July 2017
Clay

Costa Rica
1

			1	2	3
1	(Dominican Republic) (Costa Rica)	Kelly Williford; Tania Lea Aizenman Sánchez	6; 1	6; 2
2	(Dominican Republic) (Costa Rica)	Michelle Marie Valdez; Ariana Rahmanparast	1; 6	4; 6
3	(Dominican Republic) (Costa Rica)	Karla Portalatin / Michelle Marie Valdez; Eugenia Camacho / Ariana Rahmanparast	6; 3	4; 6	3; 2	not completed

== Ninth to Twelfth place play-offs ==
The third placed teams of the four pools were drawn in head-to-head rounds to determine the 9th to 12th placings.

=== Uruguay vs. Honduras ===
Uruguay
1
Centro de Alto Rendimiento Fred Maduro, Panama City, Panama
22 July 2017
Clay

Honduras
1

			1	2	3
1	(Uruguay) (Honduras)	Guillermina Grant; Natalie Gabriela Espinal Sánchez	5; 7	6; 1	6^{5} 7^{7}
2	(Uruguay) (Honduras)	Florencia Rossi; Alejandra Obando	6; 0	6; 3
3	(Uruguay) (Honduras)	Florencia Rossi / Fernanda Secinaro; Daniela Obando / Ana Gabriela Zavala Mata	1; 0			not completed

=== Barbados vs. Bahamas ===
Barbados
1
Centro de Alto Rendimiento Fred Maduro, Panama City, Panama
22 July 2017
Clay

Bahamas
1

			1	2	3
1	(Barbados) (The Bahamas)	Cherise Slocombe; Sydney Clarke	6; 3	3; 6	6^{4} 7^{7}
2	(Barbados) (The Bahamas)	Kiana Marshall; Iesha Shepherd	2; 6	6; 2	6; 1
3	(Barbados) (The Bahamas)	Kiana Marshall / Cherise Slocombe; Sydney Clarke / Iesha Shepherd				not played

== Final placements ==
Placing	Teams			
Promoted	Puerto Rico		Guatemala	
Third	Ecuador		Peru	
Fifth	Cuba			
Sixth	Dominican Republic		Costa Rica	
Eighth	Trinidad and Tobago			
Ninth	Uruguay	Honduras	Barbados	Bahamas
Thirteenth	Panama			

- Guatemala and Puerto Rico advanced to Americas Zone Group I in 2018.

== See also ==
- Fed Cup structure
