= 2016 Fed Cup Americas Zone Group II – play-offs =

The play-offs of the 2016 Fed Cup Americas Zone Group II were the final stages of the Group II Zonal Competition involving teams from the Americas. Using the positions determined in their pools, the nine teams faced off to determine their placing in the 2016 Fed Cup Americas Zone Group II. The top two teams advanced to Group I for the next year.

Placing	Pool A	Pool B
1	Venezuela	Puerto Rico
2	Chile	Guatemala
3	Honduras	Uruguay
4	Costa Rica	Dominican Republic
5	—N/a	Bahamas

== Promotional play-offs ==
The first and second placed teams of the two pools were drawn in head-to-head rounds. The winners advanced to Group I.

=== Venezuela vs. Guatemala ===
Venezuela
2
Centro de Tenis Honda, Bayamón, Puerto Rico
6 February 2016
Hard (outdoors)

Guatemala
0

			1	2	3
1	(Venezuela) (Guatemala)	Aymet Uzcátegui; Kirsten-Andrea Weedon	6; 2	6; 3
2	(Venezuela) (Guatemala)	Andrea Gámiz; Melissa Morales	6; 1	6; 3
3	(Venezuela) (Guatemala)	Andrea Gámiz / Aymet Uzcátegui; Melissa Morales / Kirsten-Andrea Weedon				not played

=== Puerto Rico vs. Chile ===
Puerto Rico
1
Centro de Tenis Honda, Bayamón, Puerto Rico
6 February 2016
Hard (outdoors)

Chile
2

			1	2	3
1	(Puerto Rico) (Chile)	Julieanne Bou; Andrea Koch Benvenuto	2; 6	0; 6
2	(Puerto Rico) (Chile)	Monica Puig; Daniela Seguel	6; 1	6; 2
3	(Puerto Rico) (Chile)	Ana Sofía Cordero / Monica Puig; Andrea Koch Benvenuto / Daniela Seguel	1; 6	6; 3	5; 7

== Fifth place play-off ==
The third placed teams of the two pools were drawn in head-to-head rounds to determine the 5th and 6th placings.

=== Honduras vs. Uruguay ===
Honduras
0
Centro de Tenis Honda, Bayamón, Puerto Rico
6 February 2016
Hard (outdoors)

Uruguay
2

			1	2	3
1	(Honduras) (Uruguay)	Daniela Obando; Florencia Rossi	2; 6	0; 6
2	(Honduras) (Uruguay)	Alejandra Obando; Margot Mercier	6^{4} 7^{7}	6; 3	6^{2} 7^{7}
3	(Honduras) (Uruguay)	Natalie Gabriela Espinal Sánchez / Ana Gabriela Zavala Mata; Margot Mercier / Florencia Rossi				not played

== Seventh place play-off ==
The fourth placed teams of the two pools were drawn in head-to-head rounds to determine the 7th and 8th placings.

=== Costa Rica vs. Dominican Republic ===
Costa Rica
2
Centro de Tenis Honda, Bayamón, Puerto Rico
6 February 2016
Hard (outdoors)

Dominican Republic
0

			1	2	3
1	(Costa Rica) (Dominican Republic)	Mariella Calderón; Penélope Abreu	6; 1	6; 1
2	(Costa Rica) (Dominican Republic)	Camila Quesada; Luisanna Rodríguez	6; 1	6; 1
3	(Costa Rica) (Dominican Republic)	Mariella Calderón / Camila Quesada; Penélope Abreu / Luisanna Rodríguez				not played

== Final placements ==
Placing	Teams	
Promoted	Venezuela	Chile
Third	Guatemala	Puerto Rico
Fifth	Uruguay	
Sixth	Honduras	
Seventh	Costa Rica	
Eighth	Dominican Republic	
Ninth	Bahamas	

- Venezuela and Chile advanced to Group I.

== See also ==
- Fed Cup structure
