= 2022 Billie Jean King Cup Americas Zone Group II – Pool D =

Subsection of tennis competition

Pool D of the 2022 Billie Jean King Cup Americas Zone Group II was one of four pools in the Americas zone of the 2022 Billie Jean King Cup. Five teams competed in a round robin competition, with each team proceeding to their respective sections of the play-offs: the top team played for advancement to Group I in 2023.

== Standings ==
		URU	HON	CRC	JAM	BAR	RR; W–L	Set; W–L	Game; W–L	Standings
4	Uruguay		3–0	3–0	3–0	3–0	12–0	24–2 (92%)	153–60 (72%)	1
7	Honduras	0–3		3–0	3–0	3–0	9–3	19–8 (70%)	137–83 (62%)	2
9	Costa Rica	0–3	0–3		3–0	2–1	5–7	14–14 (50%)	114–122 (48%)	3
13	Jamaica	0–3	0–3	0–3		2–1	2–10	4–20 (17%)	56–135 (29%)	4
14	Barbados	0–3	0–3	1–2	1–2		2–10	4–21 (16%)	71–131 (35%)	5

Standings are determined by: 1. number of wins; 2. number of matches; 3. in two-team ties, head-to-head records; 4. in three-team ties, (a) percentage of matches won (head-to-head records if two teams remain tied), then (b) percentage of sets won (head-to-head records if two teams remain tied), then (c) percentage of games won (head-to-head records if two teams remain tied), then (d) Billie Jean King Cup rankings.

== Round-robin ==
=== Uruguay vs. Barbados ===
Uruguay
3
Centro Nacional de Tenis Parque del Este, Santo Domingo Este, Dominican Republic
25 July 2022
Hard

Barbados
0

			1	2	3
1	(Uruguay) (Barbados)	Agustina Cuestas; Serena Bryan	6; 2	6; 1
2	(Uruguay) (Barbados)	Guillermina Grant; Hannah Chambers	6; 3	6; 3
3	(Uruguay) (Barbados)	Guillermina Grant / Juliana Rodríguez; Hannah Chambers / Cherise Slocombe	6; 1	6; 0

=== Honduras vs. Costa Rica ===
Honduras
3
Centro Nacional de Tenis Parque del Este, Santo Domingo Este, Dominican Republic
25 July 2022
Hard

Costa Rica
0

			1	2	3
1	(Honduras) (Costa Rica)	Daniela Obando; Nicole Alfaro	6; 4	3; 6	6; 0
2	(Honduras) (Costa Rica)	Natalie Gabriela Espinal Sánchez; Ariana Rahmanparast	6; 3	4; 6	2; 1	retired
3	(Honduras) (Costa Rica)	Alejandra Obando / Daniela Obando; Nicole Alfaro / Eugenia Camacho	7^{7} 6^{4}	6; 4

=== Uruguay vs. Honduras ===
Uruguay
3
Centro Nacional de Tenis Parque del Este, Santo Domingo Este, Dominican Republic
26 July 2022
Hard

Honduras
0

			1	2	3
1	(Uruguay) (Honduras)	Agustina Cuestas; Alejandra Obando	4; 6	6; 2	6; 2
2	(Uruguay) (Honduras)	Guillermina Grant; Natalie Gabriela Espinal Sánchez	7^{7} 6^{3}	6; 3
3	(Uruguay) (Honduras)	Guillermina Grant / Juliana Rodríguez; Isabella Álvarez Fu / Gabriela del Campo	6; 1	6; 1

=== Costa Rica vs. Jamaica ===
Costa Rica
3
Centro Nacional de Tenis Parque del Este, Santo Domingo Este, Dominican Republic
26 July 2022
Hard

Jamaica
0

			1	2	3
1	(Costa Rica) (Jamaica)	Nicole Alfaro; Pauline Hylton	6; 2	6; 1
2	(Costa Rica) (Jamaica)	Eugenia Camacho; Katherine Dibbs	6; 2	6; 2
3	(Costa Rica) (Jamaica)	Nicole Alfaro / Eugenia Camacho; Katherine Dibbs / Pauline Hylton	6; 2	6; 3

=== Uruguay vs. Jamaica ===
Uruguay
3
Centro Nacional de Tenis Parque del Este, Santo Domingo Este, Dominican Republic
27 July 2022
Hard

Jamaica
0

			1	2	3
1	(Uruguay) (Jamaica)	Juliana Rodríguez; Katherine Dibbs	6; 2	6; 2
2	(Uruguay) (Jamaica)	Guillermina Grant; Junmoke James	6; 2	6; 0
3	(Uruguay) (Jamaica)	Agustina Cuestas / Juliana Rodríguez; Katherine Dibbs / Junmoke James	6; 4	6; 4

=== Honduras vs. Barbados ===
Honduras
3
Centro Nacional de Tenis Parque del Este, Santo Domingo Este, Dominican Republic
27 July 2022
Hard

Barbados
0

			1	2	3
1	(Honduras) (Barbados)	Daniela Obando; Serena Bryan	6; 1	6; 2
2	(Honduras) (Barbados)	Natalie Gabriela Espinal Sánchez; Hannah Chambers	6; 1	6; 0
3	(Honduras) (Barbados)	Natalie Gabriela Espinal Sánchez / Daniela Obando; Hannah Chambers / Cherise Slocombe	6; 2	6; 2

=== Uruguay vs. Costa Rica ===
Uruguay
3
Centro Nacional de Tenis Parque del Este, Santo Domingo Este, Dominican Republic
28 July 2022
Hard

Costa Rica
0

			1	2	3
1	(Uruguay) (Costa Rica)	Agustina Cuestas; Nicole Alfaro	4; 6	6; 4	6; 1
2	(Uruguay) (Costa Rica)	Guillermina Grant; Ariana Rahmanparast	6; 0	6; 0
3	(Uruguay) (Costa Rica)	Guillermina Grant / Juliana Rodríguez; Nicole Alfaro / Ariana Rahmanparast	6; 2	6; 2

=== Barbados vs. Jamaica ===
Barbados
1
Centro Nacional de Tenis Parque del Este, Santo Domingo Este, Dominican Republic
28 July 2022
Hard

Jamaica
2

			1	2	3
1	(Barbados) (Jamaica)	Cherise Slocombe; Katherine Dibbs	6^{3} 7^{7}	4; 6
2	(Barbados) (Jamaica)	Hannah Chambers; Junmoke James	2; 6	3; 6
3	(Barbados) (Jamaica)	Hannah Chambers / Cherise Slocombe; Courtney Chin / Pauline Hylton	6; 0	6; 0

=== Honduras vs. Jamaica ===
Honduras
3
Centro Nacional de Tenis Parque del Este, Santo Domingo Este, Dominican Republic
29 July 2022
Hard

Jamaica
0

			1	2	3
1	(Honduras) (Jamaica)	Daniela Obando; Katherine Dibbs	6; 2	6; 1
2	(Honduras) (Jamaica)	Natalie Gabriela Espinal Sánchez; Junmoke James	6; 0	6; 1
3	(Honduras) (Jamaica)	Natalie Gabriela Espinal Sánchez / Alejandra Obando; Katherine Dibbs / Pauline Hylton	6; 1	6; 0

=== Costa Rica vs. Barbados ===
Costa Rica
2
Centro Nacional de Tenis Parque del Este, Santo Domingo Este, Dominican Republic
29 July 2022
Hard

Barbados
1

			1	2	3
1	(Costa Rica) (Barbados)	Nicole Alfaro; Serena Bryan	6; 2	6; 4
2	(Costa Rica) (Barbados)	Ariana Rahmanparast; Hannah Chambers	4; 6	6; 2	0; 6
3	(Costa Rica) (Barbados)	Nicole Alfaro / Eugenia Camacho; Serena Bryan / Hannah Chambers	6; 2	6; 4
