= 2017 Fed Cup Asia/Oceania Zone Group I – Pool B =

Subsection of tennis competition

Pool B of the 2017 Fed Cup Asia/Oceania Zone Group I was one of two pools in the Asia/Oceania zone of the 2017 Fed Cup. Four teams competed in a round robin competition, with the top team and the bottom team proceeding to their respective sections of the play-offs: the top team played for advancement to the World Group II Play-offs, while the bottom team faced potential relegation to Group II.

== Standings ==
		CHN	JPN	IND	PHI	RR; W–L	Set; W–L	Game; W–L	Standings
26	China		0–3	3–0	3–0	2–1	13–7 (65%)	108–89 (55%)	2
28	Japan	3–0		3–0	3–0	3–0	18–1 (95%)	116–53 (69%)	1
35	India	0–3	0–3		2–1	1–2	5–14 (26%)	69–101 (41%)	3
37	Philippines	0–3	0–3	1–2		0–3	2–16 (11%)	60–105 (36%)	4

Standings are determined by: 1. number of wins; 2. number of matches; 3. in two-team ties, head-to-head records; 4. in three-team ties, (a) percentage of sets won (head-to-head records if two teams remain tied), then (b) percentage of games won (head-to-head records if two teams remain tied), then (c) Fed Cup rankings.

== Round-robin ==
=== China vs. Philippines ===
China
3
Daulet National Tennis Centre, Astana, Kazakhstan
8 February 2017
Hard (indoors)

Philippines
0

			1	2	3
1	(China) (Philippines)	Zhang Kailin; Anna Clarice Patrimonio	6; 2	6; 2
2	(China) (Philippines)	Zhu Lin; Katharina Lehnert	7^{7} 6^{5}	6; 4
3	(China) (Philippines)	Yang Zhaoxuan / Zhang Kailin; Khim Iglupas / Katharina Lehnert	6; 3	6; 2

=== Japan vs. India ===
Japan
3
Daulet National Tennis Centre, Astana, Kazakhstan
8 February 2017
Hard (indoors)

India
0

			1	2	3
1	(Japan) (India)	Naomi Osaka; Karman Kaur Thandi	6; 2	6; 2
2	(Japan) (India)	Misaki Doi; Ankita Raina	6; 0	6; 3
3	(Japan) (India)	Shuko Aoyama / Eri Hozumi; Ankita Raina / Karman Kaur Thandi	6; 1	6; 3

=== China vs. India ===
China
3
Daulet National Tennis Centre, Astana, Kazakhstan
9 February 2017
Hard (indoors)

India
0

			1	2	3
1	(China) (India)	Zhang Kailin; Karman Kaur Thandi	6; 4	6; 4
2	(China) (India)	Zhu Lin; Ankita Raina	6; 3	3; 6	6; 4
3	(China) (India)	Yang Zhaoxuan / Zhang Kailin; Riya Bhatia / Snehadevi Reddy	6; 2	6; 3

=== Japan vs. Philippines ===
Japan
3
Daulet National Tennis Centre, Astana, Kazakhstan
9 February 2017
Hard (indoors)

Philippines
0

			1	2	3
1	(Japan) (Philippines)	Naomi Osaka; Khim Iglupas	6; 2	6; 1
2	(Japan) (Philippines)	Misaki Doi; Katharina Lehnert	6; 2	6; 1
3	(Japan) (Philippines)	Shuko Aoyama / Eri Hozumi; Khim Iglupas / Anna Clarice Patrimonio	6; 2	6; 1

=== China vs. Japan ===
China
0
Daulet National Tennis Centre, Astana, Kazakhstan
10 February 2017
Hard (indoors)

Japan
3

			1	2	3
1	(China) (Japan)	Zhang Kailin; Naomi Osaka	6; 4	1; 6	2; 6
2	(China) (Japan)	Zhu Lin; Misaki Doi	6^{4} 7^{7}	6^{11} 7^{13}
3	(China) (Japan)	Duan Yingying / Yang Zhaoxuan; Shuko Aoyama / Eri Hozumi	6^{3} 7^{7}	5; 7

=== India vs. Philippines ===
India
2
Daulet National Tennis Centre, Astana, Kazakhstan
10 February 2017
Hard (indoors)

Philippines
1

			1	2	3
1	(India) (Philippines)	Karman Kaur Thandi; Khim Iglupas	6; 1	6; 4
2	(India) (Philippines)	Ankita Raina; Katharina Lehnert	3; 6	4; 6
3	(India) (Philippines)	Ankita Raina / Karman Kaur Thandi; Khim Iglupas / Katharina Lehnert	6; 4	7; 5
