= 2016 Fed Cup =

International women's tennis competition

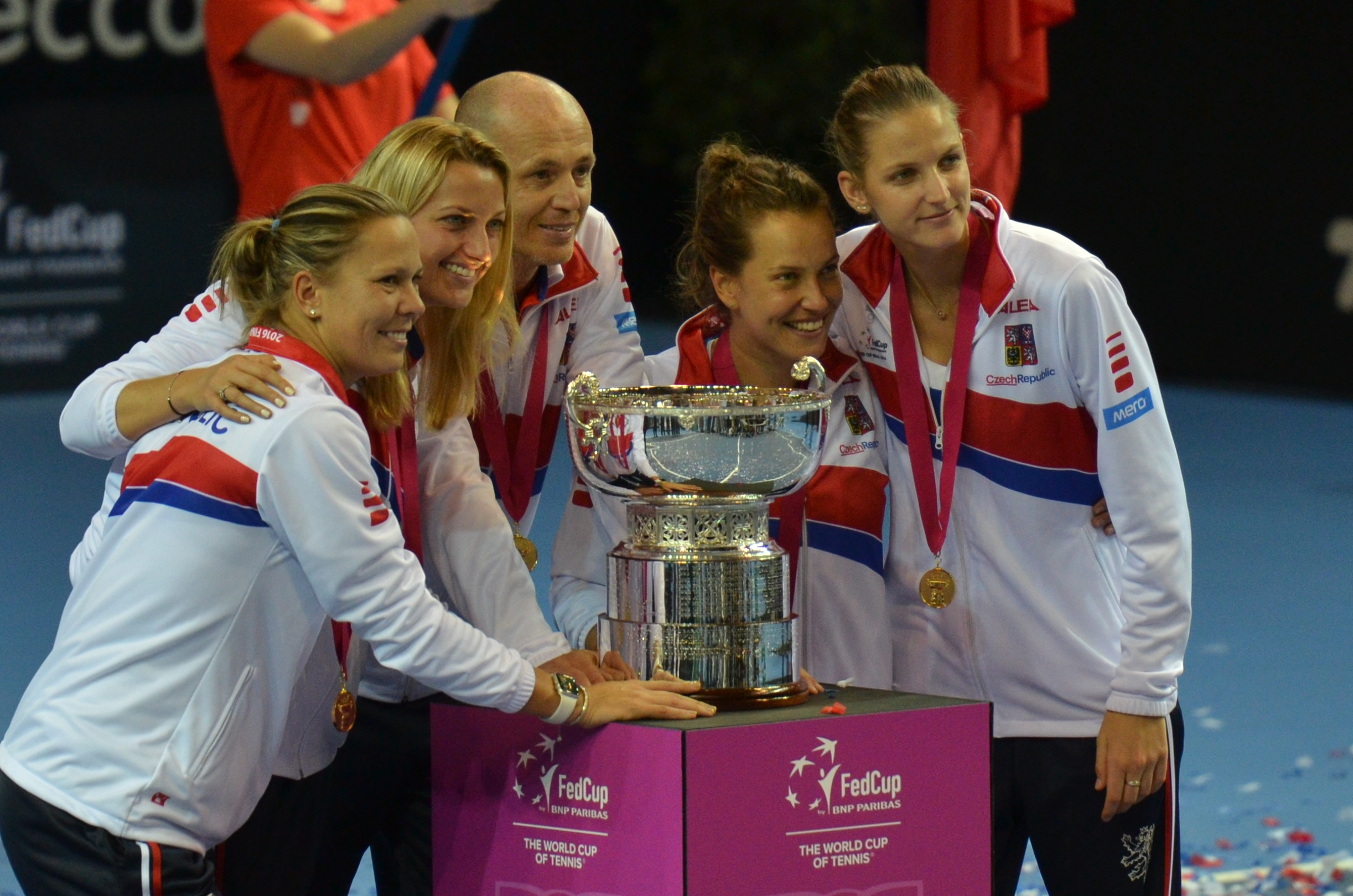

Details
- Duration: 6 February – 13 November
- Edition: 54th

Achievements (singles)

The 2016 Fed Cup was the 54th edition of the tournament between national teams in women's tennis. The final took place on 12–13 November and was won by the Czech Republic for the third year in a row, and for the fifth time in six years.

Bahrain and Kosovo made their first appearances in the tournament.

== World Group ==
Participating teams
Czech Republic	France	Germany	Italy
Netherlands	Romania	Russia	Switzerland

=== Seeds ===
1. Czech Republic (champions)
2. Russia (first round)
3. Germany (first round)
4. Italy (first round)

=== Draw ===
Quarterfinals
Cluj-Napoca, Romania
1	Czech Republic	3
Romania	2
Leipzig, Germany
Switzerland	3
3	Germany	2
Marseille, France
4	Italy	1
France	4
Moscow, Russia
Netherlands	3
2	Russia	1

Semifinals
Lucerne, Switzerland
1	Czech Republic	3
Switzerland	2
Trélazé, France
France	3
Netherlands	2

Final
Strasbourg, France
1	Czech Republic	3
France	2

=== Final ===
==== France vs. Czech Republic ====
France
2
Strasbourg, France
12–13 November 2016
Hard (indoors)

Czech Republic
3

			1	2	3
1	(France) (Czech Republic)	Kristina Mladenovic; Karolína Plíšková	3; 6	6; 4	14; 16
2	(France) (Czech Republic)	Caroline Garcia; Petra Kvitová	7; 6	6; 3
3	(France) (Czech Republic)	Caroline Garcia; Karolína Plíšková	6; 3	3; 6	6; 3
4	(France) (Czech Republic)	Alizé Cornet; Barbora Strýcová	2; 6	6; 7
5	(France) (Czech Republic)	Caroline Garcia / Kristina Mladenovic; Karolína Plíšková / Barbora Strýcová	5; 7	5; 7

== World Group play-offs ==
The four losing teams in the World Group first round ties, and four winners of the World Group II ties entered the draw for the World Group play-offs. Four seeded teams, based on the latest Fed Cup ranking, were drawn against four unseeded teams.

Venue	Surface	Home team	Score	Visiting team
Moscow, Russia	Clay (i)	Russia (1)	2–3	Belarus
Lleida, Spain	Clay	Spain	4–0	Italy (2)
Cluj-Napoca, Romania	Clay (i)	Romania	1–4	Germany (3)
Brisbane, Australia	Clay	Australia (4)	0–4	United States

- Germany will remain in World Group for 2017.
- Belarus, Spain and United States are promoted to the World Group for 2017.
- Australia will remain in World Group II for 2017.
- Italy, Romania and Russia are relegated to World Group II for 2017.

== World Group II ==
The World Group II was the second highest level of Fed Cup competition in 2016. Winners advanced to the World Group play-offs, and losers played in the World Group II play-offs.

Date: 6–7 February

Participating teams
Australia	Belarus	Canada	Poland
Serbia	Slovakia	Spain	United States

=== Seeds ===
1. Australia
2. Serbia (World Group II play-off)
3. Poland (World Group II play-off)
4. Canada (World Group II play-off)

Date: 6–7 February

Venue	Surface	Home team	Score	Visiting team
Bratislava, Slovakia	Hard (i)	Slovakia	2–3	Australia (1)
Kraljevo, Serbia	Hard (i)	Serbia (2)	0–4	Spain
Kailua Kona, USA	Hard	United States	4–0	Poland (3)
Québec City, Canada	Hard (i)	Canada (4)	2–3	Belarus

== World Group II play-offs ==
The four losing teams from World Group II played off against qualifiers from Zonal Group I.

Venue	Surface	Home team	Score	Visiting team
Belgrade, Serbia	Clay (i)	Serbia (1)	2–3	Belgium
Bratislava, Slovakia	Clay (i)	Slovakia	3–2	Canada (2)
Inowrocław, Poland	Hard (i)	Poland (3)	1–4	Chinese Taipei
Kyiv, Ukraine	Hard	Ukraine	4–0	Argentina (4)

- Slovakia will remain in World Group II in 2017.
- Belgium, Chinese Taipei and Ukraine are promoted to World Group II in 2017.
- Argentina will remain in Zonal Group I in 2017.
- Canada, Poland and Serbia are relegated to Zonal Group I in 2017.

== Americas Zone ==
=== Group I ===
Venue: Country Club Las Palmas, Santa Cruz, Bolivia (outdoor clay)

Dates: 3–6 February

Participating teams

Pool A

- Bolivia
- Colombia
- Mexico
- Paraguay

Pool B

- Argentina
- Brazil
- Ecuador
- Peru

==== Play-offs ====
- Argentina was promoted to the 2016 Fed Cup World Group II play-offs.
- Ecuador and Peru were relegated to Americas Zone Group II in 2017.

=== Group II ===
Venue: Centro de Tenis Honda, Bayamón, Puerto Rico (outdoor hard)

Dates: 1–6 February

Participating teams

Pool A

- Chile
- Costa Rica
- Honduras
- Venezuela

Pool B

- Bahamas
- Dominican Republic
- Guatemala
- Puerto Rico
- Uruguay

Withdrawn

- Barbados
- Bermuda
- Trinidad and Tobago

Inactive teams

- Antigua and Barbuda
- Cuba
- El Salvador
- Eastern Caribbean
- Haiti
- Jamaica
- Panama

==== Play-offs ====
- Chile and Venezuela were promoted to Americas Zone Group I in 2017.

== Asia/Oceania Zone ==
=== Group I ===
Venue: Hua Hin Centennial Sports Club, Hua Hin, Thailand (outdoor hard)

Dates: 3–6 February

Participating teams

Pool A

- India
- Japan
- Thailand
- Uzbekistan

Pool B

- China
- Chinese Taipei
- Kazakhstan
- South Korea

==== Play-offs ====
- Chinese Taipei was promoted to the 2016 Fed Cup World Group II play-offs.
- Uzbekistan was relegated to Asia/Oceania Zone Group II in 2017.

=== Group II ===
Venue: Centennial Sports Club, Hua Hin, Thailand (outdoor hard)

Dates: 11–16 April

Participating teams

Pool A

- Bahrain
- Hong Kong
- Iran
- Pacific Oceania
- Philippines

Pool B

- Indonesia
- Kyrgyzstan
- Malaysia
- Pakistan
- Singapore
- Sri Lanka

Withdrawn

- Turkmenistan

Inactive teams

- Brunei
- Iraq
- Jordan
- Lebanon
- New Zealand
- Oman
- Syria
- Tajikistan
- Vietnam

==== Play-offs ====
- Philippines were promoted to Asia/Oceania Group I in 2017.

== Europe/Africa Zone ==
=== Group I ===
Venue: Municipal Tennis Centre, Eilat, Israel (outdoor hard)

Dates: 3–6 February

Participating teams

Pool A

- Portugal
- Sweden
- Ukraine

Pool C

- Croatia
- Estonia
- Israel
- Turkey

Pool B

- Georgia
- Great Britain
- South Africa

Pool D

- Belgium
- Bulgaria
- Hungary
- Latvia

==== Play-offs ====
- Belgium and Ukraine were promoted to 2016 Fed Cup World Group II play-offs
- South Africa and Sweden were relegated to Europe/Africa Zone Group II in 2017

=== Group II ===
Venue: Gezira Sporting Club, Cairo, Egypt (outdoor clay)

Dates: 13–16 April

Participating teams

Pool A

- Denmark
- Finland
- Lithuania

Pool B

- Austria
- Bosnia and Herzegovina
- Egypt
- Liechtenstein

==== Play-offs ====
- Austria and Bosnia and Herzegovina were promoted to Europe/Africa Zone Group I in 2017.
- Finland and Liechtenstein were relegated to Europe/Africa Zone Group III in 2017.

=== Group III ===
Venue: Bellevue, Ulcinj, Montenegro (outdoor clay)

Dates: 11–16 April

Participating teams

Pool A

- Tunisia
- Greece
- Malta
- Luxembourg

Pool C

- Moldova
- Cyprus
- Algeria
- Madagascar

Pool B

- Ireland
- Armenia
- Macedonia
- Iceland

Pool D

- Montenegro
- Norway
- Morocco
- Kosovo
- Mozambique

Withdrawn

- Namibia

Inactive teams

- Azerbaijan
- Botswana
- Cameroon
- Congo
- Ethiopia
- Kenya
- Lesotho
- Mauritius
- San Marino
- Senegal
- Zimbabwe

==== Play-offs ====
- Luxembourg and Norway were promoted to Europe/Africa Zone Group II in 2017.
