= 2016 Fed Cup Americas Zone Group II – Pool B =

Group B of the 2016 Fed Cup Americas Zone Group II was one of two pools in the Americas zone of the 2016 Fed Cup. Four teams competed in a round robin competition, with the top two teams proceeding to the play-offs where they played for promotion to Group I.

== Standings ==
		(Dominican Republic) DOM	(Guatemala) GUA	(Puerto Rico) PUR	(The Bahamas) BAH	(Uruguay) URU	RR; W–L	Set; W–L	Game; W–L	Standings
50	Dominican Republic		0–3	0–3	2–1	0–3	2–10	4–21	50–138	4
56	Guatemala	3–0		1–2	3–0	2–1	9–3	19–7	140–74	2
61	Puerto Rico	3–0	2–1		3–0	2–1	10–2	21–4	145–62	1
71	Bahamas	1–2	0–3	0–3		1–2	2–10	5–20	61–131	5
73	Uruguay	3–0	1–2	1–2	2–1		7–5	14–12	120–115	3

== Round-robin ==
=== Dominican Republic vs. Uruguay ===
Dominican Republic
0
Centro de Tenis Honda, Bayamón, Puerto Rico
1 February 2016
Hard (outdoor)

Uruguay
3

			1	2	3
1	(Dominican Republic) (Uruguay)	Penélope Abreu; Florencia Rossi	1; 6	0; 6
2	(Dominican Republic) (Uruguay)	Laura Lissette Quezada Martínez; Margot Mercier	3; 6	3; 6
3	(Dominican Republic) (Uruguay)	Laura Lissette Quezada Martínez / Luisanna Rodríguez; Margot Mercier / Fernanda Secinaro	3; 6	3; 6

=== Guatemala vs. Bahamas ===
Guatemala
3
Centro de Tenis Honda, Bayamón, Puerto Rico
1 February 2016
Hard (outdoor)

Bahamas
0

			1	2	3
1	(Guatemala) (The Bahamas)	Kirsten-Andrea Weedon; Isabel Donaldson	6; 0	6; 0
2	(Guatemala) (The Bahamas)	Melissa Morales; Iesha Shepherd	6; 3	6; 1
3	(Guatemala) (The Bahamas)	Melissa Morales / Kirsten-Andrea Weedon; Lauryn Daxon / Sierra Donaldson	6; 0	6; 0

=== Dominican Republic vs. Bahamas ===
Dominican Republic
2
Centro de Tenis Honda, Bayamón, Puerto Rico
2 February 2016
Hard (outdoor)

Bahamas
1

			1	2	3
1	(Dominican Republic) (The Bahamas)	Laura Lissette Quezada Martínez; Isabel Donaldson	6; 2	1; 6	6; 2
2	(Dominican Republic) (The Bahamas)	Luisanna Rodríguez; Iesha Shepherd	1; 6	1; 6
3	(Dominican Republic) (The Bahamas)	Laura Lissette Quezada Martínez / Luisanna Rodríguez; Isabel Donaldson / Iesha Shepherd	7^{9} 6^{7}	6; 2

=== Puerto Rico vs. Guatemala ===
Puerto Rico
2
Centro de Tenis Honda, Bayamón, Puerto Rico
2 February 2016
Hard (outdoor)

Guatemala
1

			1	2	3
1	(Puerto Rico) (Guatemala)	Ana Sofía Cordero; Kirsten-Andrea Weedon	7; 5	3; 6	1; 6
2	(Puerto Rico) (Guatemala)	Monica Puig; Melissa Morales	6; 0	6; 1
3	(Puerto Rico) (Guatemala)	Ana Sofía Cordero / Monica Puig; Melissa Morales / Kirsten-Andrea Weedon	6; 4	6; 3

=== Dominican Republic vs. Guatemala ===
Dominican Republic
0
Centro de Tenis Honda, Bayamón, Puerto Rico
3 February 2016
Hard (outdoor)

Guatemala
3

			1	2	3
1	(Dominican Republic) (Guatemala)	Penélope Abreu; Kirsten-Andrea Weedon	0; 6	2; 6
2	(Dominican Republic) (Guatemala)	Laura Lissette Quezada Martínez; Melissa Morales	1; 6	0; 6
3	(Dominican Republic) (Guatemala)	Penélope Abreu / Laura Lissette Quezada Martínez; Rut Galindo / Melissa Morales	0; 6	0; 6

=== Puerto Rico vs. Uruguay ===
Puerto Rico
2
Centro de Tenis Honda, Bayamón, Puerto Rico
3 February 2016
Hard (outdoor)

Uruguay
1

			1	2	3
1	(Puerto Rico) (Uruguay)	Ana Sofía Cordero; Florencia Rossi	1; 6	6; 3	6^{5} 7^{7}
2	(Puerto Rico) (Uruguay)	Monica Puig; Margot Mercier	6; 0	6; 0
3	(Puerto Rico) (Uruguay)	Ana Sofía Cordero / Monica Puig; Margot Mercier / Florencia Rossi	7^{7} 6^{3}	6; 3

=== Guatemala vs. Uruguay ===
Guatemala
2
Centro de Tenis Honda, Bayamón, Puerto Rico
4 February 2016
Hard (outdoor)

Uruguay
1

			1	2	3
1	(Guatemala) (Uruguay)	Kirsten-Andrea Weedon; Florencia Rossi	7; 5	6^{3} 7^{7}	6^{5} 7^{7}
2	(Guatemala) (Uruguay)	Melissa Morales; Margot Mercier	6; 2	6; 2
3	(Guatemala) (Uruguay)	Melissa Morales / Kirsten-Andrea Weedon; Margot Mercier / Florencia Rossi	6; 1	6; 4

=== Puerto Rico vs. Bahamas ===
Puerto Rico
3
Centro de Tenis Honda, Bayamón, Puerto Rico
4 February 2016
Hard (outdoor)

Bahamas
0

			1	2	3
1	(Puerto Rico) (The Bahamas)	Julieanne Bou; Isabel Donaldson	6; 0	6; 1
2	(Puerto Rico) (The Bahamas)	Monica Puig; Iesha Shepherd	6; 0	6; 0
3	(Puerto Rico) (The Bahamas)	Julieanne Bou / Ana Sofía Cordero; Isabel Donaldson / Iesha Shepherd	6; 4	6; 1

=== Puerto Rico vs. Dominican Republic ===
Puerto Rico
3
Centro de Tenis Honda, Bayamón, Puerto Rico
5 February 2016
Hard (outdoor)

Dominican Republic
0

			1	2	3
1	(Puerto Rico) (Dominican Republic)	Julieanne Bou; Penélope Abreu	6; 3	6; 0
2	(Puerto Rico) (Dominican Republic)	Monica Puig; Luisanna Rodríguez	6; 0	6; 1
3	(Puerto Rico) (Dominican Republic)	Ana Sofía Cordero / Monica Puig; Penélope Abreu / Luisanna Rodríguez	6; 1	6; 1

=== Bahamas vs. Uruguay ===
Bahamas
1
Centro de Tenis Honda, Bayamón, Puerto Rico
5 February 2016
Hard (outdoor)

Uruguay
2

			1	2	3
1	(The Bahamas) (Uruguay)	Isabel Donaldson; Fernanda Secinaro	6; 1	7^{7} 6^{5}
2	(The Bahamas) (Uruguay)	Iesha Shepherd; Florencia Rossi	2; 6	1; 6
3	(The Bahamas) (Uruguay)	Lauryn Daxon / Iesha Shepherd; Margot Mercier / Florencia Rossi	4; 6	1; 6
