= 2017 Fed Cup Americas Zone =

Subsection of tennis competition

The Americas Zone was one of three zones of regional competition in the 2017 Fed Cup.

== Group I ==
- Venue: Club Deportivo la Asunción, Metepec, Mexico (outdoor hard)
- Date: 6–11 February

The nine teams were divided into two pools of four and five teams. The two pool winners took part in a play-off to determine the nation advancing to the World Group II play-offs. The four nations finishing last and second last in their pools took part in relegation play-offs, with the two losing nations being relegated to Group II for 2018.

Seeding: The seeding was based on the Fed Cup Rankings of 14 November 2016 (shown in parentheses below).

Pot 1	Pot 2	Pot 3	Pot 4
1. Canada (17); 2. Argentina (19)	3. Paraguay (20); 4. Brazil (21)	5. Mexico (32); 6. Bolivia (36)	7. Colombia (39); 8. Venezuela (43); 9. Chile (51)

=== Pools ===
	Pool A	CAN	PAR	VEN	BOL
1	Canada (3–0)		3–0	2–1	3–0
2	Paraguay (2–1)	0–3		2–1	3–0
3	Venezuela (1–2)	1–2	1–2		3–0
4	Bolivia (0–3)	0–3	0–3	0–3	

	Pool B	CHI	ARG	COL	BRA	MEX
1	Chile (3–1)		2–1	1–2	2–1	2–1
2	Argentina (3–1)	1–2		3–0	2–1	2–1
3	Colombia (2–2)	2–1	0–3		2–1	1–2
4	Brazil (1–3)	1–2	1–2	1–2		3–0
5	Mexico (1–3)	1–2	1–2	2–1	0–3	

=== Play-offs ===
Placing	A Team	Score	B Team
Promotional	Canada	2–0	Chile
3rd–4th	Paraguay	2–0	Argentina
5th	—		Colombia
Relegation	Venezuela	2–0	Mexico
Relegation	Bolivia	0–2	Brazil

=== Final placements ===
Placing	Teams	
Promoted/First	Canada	
Second	Chile	
Third	Paraguay	
Fourth	Argentina	
Fifth	Colombia	
Sixth	Venezuela	Brazil
Relegated/Eighth	Mexico	Bolivia

- Canada was promoted to the 2017 Fed Cup World Group II Play-offs.
- Mexico and Bolivia were relegated to Americas Zone Group II in 2018.

== Group II ==
- Venue: Centro de Alto Rendimiento Fred Maduro, Panama City, Panama (outdoor clay)
- Date: 19–22 July

The thirteen teams were divided into three pools of three teams and one pool of four teams. The four pool winners took part in a play-off to determine the two nations advancing to Group I in 2018.

Seeding: The seeding was based on the Fed Cup Rankings of 24 April 2017 (shown in parentheses below).

Pot 1	Pot 2	Pot 3
1. Ecuador (43); 2. Guatemala (51); 3. Puerto Rico (52); 4. Peru (55)	5. Dominican Republic (58); 6. Uruguay (62); 7. Trinidad and Tobago (65); 8. Costa Rica (67)	9. Bahamas (75); 10. Barbados (80); 11. Honduras (86); 12. Panama (97); 13. Cuba (-)

=== Pools ===
	Pool A	ECU	CUB	URU
1	Ecuador (2–0)		2–1	2–1
2	Cuba (1–1)	1–2		2–1
3	Uruguay (0–2)	1–2	1–2	

	Pool B	GUA	DOM	BAR
1	Guatemala (2–0)		3–0	3–0
2	Dominican Republic (1–1)	0–3		3–0
3	Barbados (0–2)	0–3	0–3	

	Pool C	PUR	TTO	HON
1	Puerto Rico (2–0)		2–1	3–0
2	Trinidad and Tobago (1–1)	1–2		2–1
3	Honduras (0–2)	0–3	1–2	

	Pool D	PER	CRC	BAH	PAN
1	Peru (3–0)		3–0	3–0	3–0
2	Costa Rica (2–1)	0–3		3–0	2–1
3	Bahamas (1–2)	0–3	0–3		2–1
4	Panama (0–3)	0–3	1–2	1–2	

=== Play-offs ===
Placing	A Team	Score	C Team
Promotional	Ecuador	0–2	Puerto Rico
5th–8th	Cuba	2–1	Trinidad and Tobago
9th–12th	Uruguay	1–1	Honduras

Placing	B Team	Score	D Team
Promotional	Guatemala	2–1	Peru
5th–8th	Dominican Republic	1–1	Costa Rica
9th–12th	Barbados	1–1	Bahamas
13th	—		Panama

=== Final placements ===
Placing	Teams			
Promoted	Puerto Rico		Guatemala	
Third	Ecuador		Peru	
Fifth	Cuba			
Sixth	Dominican Republic		Costa Rica	
Eighth	Trinidad and Tobago			
Ninth	Uruguay	Honduras	Barbados	Bahamas
Thirteenth	Panama			

- Puerto Rico and Guatemala advanced to Americas Zone Group I in 2018.
