= 2017 Fed Cup Americas Zone Group I – Pool A =

Subsection of tennis competition

Pool A of the 2017 Fed Cup Americas Zone Group I was one of two pools in the Americas zone of the 2017 Fed Cup. Four teams competed in a round robin competition, with the top team and the bottom two teams proceeding to their respective sections of the play-offs: the top team played for advancement to the World Group II Play-offs, while the bottom two teams faced potential relegation to Group II.

== Standings ==
		CAN	PAR	BOL	VEN	RR; W–L	Set; W–L	Game; W–L	Standings
17	Canada		3–0	3–0	2–1	3–0	16–2 (88%)	103–41 (72%)	1
20	Paraguay	0–3		3–0	2–1	2–1	11–10 (52%)	90–83 (52%)	2
36	Bolivia	0–3	0–3		0–3	0–3	0–18 (0%)	43–109 (28%)	4
43	Venezuela	1–2	1–2	3–0		1–2	12–9 (57%)	93–96 (49%)	3

Standings are determined by: 1. number of wins; 2. number of matches; 3. in two-team ties, head-to-head records; 4. in three-team ties, (a) percentage of sets won (head-to-head records if two teams remain tied), then (b) percentage of games won (head-to-head records if two teams remain tied), then (c) Fed Cup rankings.

== Round-robin ==
=== Canada vs. Venezuela ===
Canada
2
Club Deportivo la Asunción, Metepec, Mexico
7 February 2017
Hard

Venezuela
1

			1	2	3
1	(Canada) (Venezuela)	Charlotte Robillard-Millette; Adriana Pérez	3; 6	4; 6
2	(Canada) (Venezuela)	Bianca Andreescu; Andrea Gámiz	6; 4	6; 0
3	(Canada) (Venezuela)	Bianca Andreescu / Charlotte Robillard-Millette; Andrea Gámiz / Adriana Pérez	6; 3	6; 1

=== Paraguay vs. Bolivia ===
Paraguay
3
Club Deportivo la Asunción, Metepec, Mexico
7 February 2017
Hard

Bolivia
0

			1	2	3
1	(Paraguay) (Bolivia)	Montserrat González; Hortencia Birnbaumer	6; 2	6; 4
2	(Paraguay) (Bolivia)	Verónica Cepede Royg; Noelia Zeballos	6; 0	6; 4
3	(Paraguay) (Bolivia)	Verónica Cepede Royg / Montserrat González; Hortencia Birnbaumer / Paola Cortez Vargas	6; 2	6; 1

=== Canada vs. Bolivia ===
Canada
3
Club Deportivo la Asunción, Metepec, Mexico
8 February 2017
Hard

Bolivia
0

			1	2	3
1	(Canada) (Bolivia)	Katherine Sebov; María Fernanda Álvarez Terán	6; 3	6; 2
2	(Canada) (Bolivia)	Bianca Andreescu; Noelia Zeballos	6; 3	6; 1
3	(Canada) (Bolivia)	Charlotte Robillard-Millette / Katherine Sebov; Hortencia Birnbaumer / Paola Cortez Vargas	6; 2	6; 1

=== Paraguay vs. Venezuela ===
Paraguay
2
Club Deportivo la Asunción, Metepec, Mexico
8 February 2017
Hard

Venezuela
1

			1	2	3
1	(Paraguay) (Venezuela)	Montserrat González; Aymet Uzcátegui	4; 6	6; 1	6; 2
2	(Paraguay) (Venezuela)	Verónica Cepede Royg; Andrea Gámiz	2; 6	6; 4	6; 2
3	(Paraguay) (Venezuela)	Camila Giangreco Campiz / Montserrat González; María Gabriela Linares de Faría / Aymet Uzcátegui	6^{4} 7^{7}	6; 2	3; 6

=== Canada vs. Paraguay ===
Canada
3
Club Deportivo la Asunción, Metepec, Mexico
9 February 2017
Hard

Paraguay
0

			1	2	3
1	(Canada) (Paraguay)	Katherine Sebov; Montserrat González	6; 3	6; 1
2	(Canada) (Paraguay)	Bianca Andreescu; Verónica Cepede Royg	6; 1	6; 1
3	(Canada) (Paraguay)	Bianca Andreescu / Charlotte Robillard-Millette; Verónica Cepede Royg / Camila Giangreco Campiz	6; 0	6; 4

=== Bolivia vs. Venezuela ===
Bolivia
0
Club Deportivo la Asunción, Metepec, Mexico
9 February 2017
Hard

Venezuela
3

			1	2	3
1	(Bolivia) (Venezuela)	Hortencia Birnbaumer; Adriana Pérez	4; 6	4; 6
2	(Bolivia) (Venezuela)	Noelia Zeballos; Andrea Gámiz	0; 6	6^{3} 7^{7}
3	(Bolivia) (Venezuela)	María Fernanda Álvarez Terán / Paola Cortez Vargas; María Gabriela Linares de Faría / Aymet Uzcátegui	3; 6	3; 6
