= 2016 Fed Cup Americas Zone Group I – Pool A =

International tennis competition

Pool A of the 2016 Fed Cup Americas Zone Group I was one of two pools in the Americas zone of the 2016 Fed Cup. Four teams competed in a round robin competition, with the top team and the bottom two teams proceeding to their respective sections of the play-offs: the top team played for advancement to the World Group II Play-offs, while the bottom two teams faced potential relegation to Group II.

== Standings ==
| | | (Paraguay) PAR | (Colombia) COL | (Mexico) MEX | (Bolivia) BOL | RR; W–L | Set; W–L | Game; W–L | Standings |
| 17 | Paraguay | | 2–1 | 2–1 | 2–1 | 3–0 | 13–8 | 109–80 | 1 |
| 28 | Colombia | 1–2 | | 0–3 | 1–2 | 0–3 | 6–15 | 72–103 | 4 |
| 36 | Mexico | 1–2 | 3–0 | | 2–1 | 2–1 | 13–9 | 105–102 | 2 |
| 41 | Bolivia | 1–2 | 2–1 | 1–2 | | 1–2 | 12–12 | 107–108 | 3 |

== Round-robin ==
=== Paraguay vs. Mexico ===
Paraguay
2
Country Club Las Palmas, Santa Cruz, Bolivia
3 February 2016
Clay (outdoor)

Mexico
1

| | | | 1 | 2 | 3 |
|---|---|---|---|---|---|
| 1 | (Paraguay) (Mexico) | Camila Giangreco Campiz; Ana Sofía Sánchez | 6^{6} 7^{8} | 4; 6 |
| 2 | (Paraguay) (Mexico) | Montserrat González; Victoria Rodríguez | 5; 7 | 6; 2 | 6; 4 |
| 3 | (Paraguay) (Mexico) | Camila Giangreco Campiz / Montserrat González; Victoria Rodríguez / Renata Zarazúa | 6; 2 | 6; 2 |

=== Bolivia vs. Colombia ===
Bolivia
2
Country Club Las Palmas, Santa Cruz, Bolivia
3 February 2016
Clay (outdoor)

Colombia
1

| | | | 1 | 2 | 3 |
|---|---|---|---|---|---|
| 1 | (Bolivia) (Colombia) | Noelia Zeballos; Emiliana Arango | 6; 3 | 5; 7 | 1; 6 |
| 2 | (Bolivia) (Colombia) | María Fernanda Álvarez Terán; María Fernanda Herazo | 7; 5 | 6; 1 |
| 3 | (Bolivia) (Colombia) | María Fernanda Álvarez Terán / Noelia Zeballos; María Fernanda Herazo / María Paulina Pérez | 2; 6 | 6; 4 | 1; 0 |

=== Bolivia vs. Paraguay ===
Bolivia
1
Country Club Las Palmas, Santa Cruz, Bolivia
4 February 2016
Clay (outdoor)

Paraguay
2

| | | | 1 | 2 | 3 |
|---|---|---|---|---|---|
| 1 | (Bolivia) (Paraguay) | Noelia Zeballos; Camila Giangreco Campiz | 6; 4 | 4; 6 | 6; 3 |
| 2 | (Bolivia) (Paraguay) | María Fernanda Álvarez Terán; Montserrat González | 2; 6 | 1; 6 |
| 3 | (Bolivia) (Paraguay) | María Fernanda Álvarez Terán / Noelia Zeballos; Camila Giangreco Campiz / Montserrat González | 6; 2 | 3; 6 | 2; 6 |

=== Colombia vs. Mexico ===
Colombia
0
Country Club Las Palmas, Santa Cruz, Bolivia
4 February 2016
Clay (outdoor)

Mexico
3

| | | | 1 | 2 | 3 |
|---|---|---|---|---|---|
| 1 | (Colombia) (Mexico) | Emiliana Arango; Ana Sofía Sánchez | 3; 6 | 0; 6 |
| 2 | (Colombia) (Mexico) | María Paulina Pérez; Victoria Rodríguez | 1; 6 | 4; 6 |
| 3 | (Colombia) (Mexico) | María Fernanda Herazo / María Paulina Pérez; Victoria Rodríguez / Renata Zarazúa | 6; 2 | 4; 6 | 2; 6 |

=== Paraguay vs. Colombia ===
Paraguay
2
Country Club Las Palmas, Santa Cruz, Bolivia
5 February 2016
Clay (outdoor)

Colombia
1

| | | | 1 | 2 | 3 |
|---|---|---|---|---|---|
| 1 | (Paraguay) (Colombia) | Camila Giangreco Campiz; Camila Osorio | 4; 6 | 3; 6 |
| 2 | (Paraguay) (Colombia) | Montserrat González; María Paulina Pérez | 6; 0 | 6; 2 |
| 3 | (Paraguay) (Colombia) | Camila Giangreco Campiz / Montserrat González; Emiliana Arango / Camila Osorio | 6; 3 | 6; 3 |

=== Bolivia vs. Mexico ===
Bolivia
1
Country Club Las Palmas, Santa Cruz, Bolivia
5 February 2016
Clay (outdoor)

Mexico
2

| | | | 1 | 2 | 3 |
|---|---|---|---|---|---|
| 1 | (Bolivia) (Mexico) | Noelia Zeballos; Ana Sofía Sánchez | 3; 6 | 7; 5 | 5; 7 |
| 2 | (Bolivia) (Mexico) | María Fernanda Álvarez Terán; Victoria Rodríguez | 6; 3 | 6; 2 |
| 3 | (Bolivia) (Mexico) | María Fernanda Álvarez Terán / Noelia Zeballos; Ana Sofía Sánchez / Renata Zarazúa | 4; 6 | 6; 1 | 6^{3} 7^{7} |
