= 2017 Fed Cup Americas Zone Group I – Pool B =

Subsection of tennis competition

Pool B of the 2017 Fed Cup Americas Zone Group I was one of two pools in the Americas zone of the 2017 Fed Cup. Five teams competed in a round robin competition, with the top team and the bottom two teams proceeding to their respective sections of the play-offs: the top team played for advancement to the World Group II Play-offs, while the bottom two teams faced potential relegation to Group II.

== Standings ==
		ARG	BRA	MEX	COL	CHI	RR; W–L	Set; W–L	Game; W–L	Standings
19	Argentina		2–1	2–1	3–0	1–2	3–1	18–11 (62%)	148–121 (55%)	2
21	Brazil	1–2		3–0	1–2	1–2	1–3	15–18 (45%)	155–156 (50%)	4
32	Mexico	1–2	0–3		2–1	1–2	1–3	12–16 (43%)	122–132 (48%)	5
39	Colombia	0–3	2–1	1–2		2–1	2–2	12–16 (43%)	119–131 (47%)	3
51	Chile	2–1	2–1	2–1	1–2		3–1	16–12 (57%)	126–130 (49%)	1

Standings are determined by: 1. number of wins; 2. number of matches; 3. in two-team ties, head-to-head records; 4. in three-team ties, (a) percentage of sets won (head-to-head records if two teams remain tied), then (b) percentage of games won (head-to-head records if two teams remain tied), then (c) Fed Cup rankings.

== Round-robin ==
=== Argentina vs. Chile ===
Argentina
1
Club Deportivo la Asunción, Metepec, Mexico
6 February 2017
Hard

Chile
2

			1	2	3
1	(Argentina) (Chile)	Nadia Podoroska; Fernanda Brito	6; 0	6; 2
2	(Argentina) (Chile)	Catalina Pella; Daniela Seguel	3; 6	4; 6
3	(Argentina) (Chile)	María Irigoyen / Nadia Podoroska; Bárbara Gatica / Daniela Seguel	6; 4	6^{4} 7^{7}	6^{6} 7^{8}

=== Brazil vs. Colombia ===
Brazil
1
Club Deportivo la Asunción, Metepec, Mexico
6 February 2017
Hard

Colombia
2

			1	2	3
1	(Brazil) (Colombia)	Gabriela Cé; Camila Osorio	6; 4	3; 6	6^{15} 7^{17}
2	(Brazil) (Colombia)	Teliana Pereira; Mariana Duque Mariño	4; 6	1; 6
3	(Brazil) (Colombia)	Carolina Alves / Luisa Stefani; María Fernanda Herazo / María Paulina Pérez	4; 6	6; 4	6; 2

=== Argentina vs. Colombia ===
Argentina
3
Club Deportivo la Asunción, Metepec, Mexico
7 February 2017
Hard

Colombia
0

			1	2	3
1	(Argentina) (Colombia)	Nadia Podoroska; Camila Osorio	6; 2	6; 2
2	(Argentina) (Colombia)	Catalina Pella; Mariana Duque Mariño	1; 6	6; 3	7^{7} 6^{1}
3	(Argentina) (Colombia)	María Irigoyen / Guadalupe Pérez Rojas; María Fernanda Herazo / María Paulina Pérez	6; 2	6; 3

=== Brazil vs. Mexico ===
Brazil
3
Club Deportivo la Asunción, Metepec, Mexico
7 February 2017
Hard

Mexico
0

			1	2	3
1	(Brazil) (Mexico)	Gabriela Cé; Marcela Zacarías	5; 7	6; 1	7^{9} 6^{7}
2	(Brazil) (Mexico)	Teliana Pereira; Renata Zarazúa	4; 6	6; 3	6; 3
3	(Brazil) (Mexico)	Gabriela Cé / Teliana Pereira; Giuliana Olmos / Renata Zarazúa	6; 4	3; 6	6; 4

=== Argentina vs. Mexico ===
Argentina
2
Club Deportivo la Asunción, Metepec, Mexico
8 February 2017
Hard

Mexico
1

			1	2	3
1	(Argentina) (Mexico)	Nadia Podoroska; Giuliana Olmos	6; 4	6; 2
2	(Argentina) (Mexico)	Catalina Pella; Renata Zarazúa	3; 6	0; 6
3	(Argentina) (Mexico)	María Irigoyen / Catalina Pella; Giuliana Olmos / Renata Zarazúa	6^{2} 7^{7}	7; 5	6; 2

=== Colombia vs. Chile ===
Colombia
2
Club Deportivo la Asunción, Metepec, Mexico
8 February 2017
Hard

Chile
1

			1	2	3
1	(Colombia) (Chile)	Camila Osorio; Bárbara Gatica	6; 2	6; 2
2	(Colombia) (Chile)	Mariana Duque Mariño; Daniela Seguel	6; 4	3; 6	6; 4
3	(Colombia) (Chile)	María Fernanda Herazo / María Paulina Pérez; Bárbara Gatica / Daniela Seguel	4; 6	2; 6

=== Argentina vs. Brazil ===
Argentina
2
Club Deportivo la Asunción, Metepec, Mexico
9 February 2017
Hard

Brazil
1

			1	2	3
1	(Argentina) (Brazil)	Nadia Podoroska; Gabriela Cé	6; 3	6; 4
2	(Argentina) (Brazil)	Catalina Pella; Teliana Pereira	6; 3	4; 6	2; 6
3	(Argentina) (Brazil)	María Irigoyen / Catalina Pella; Gabriela Cé / Teliana Pereira	6; 2	3; 6	6; 3

=== Mexico vs. Chile ===
Mexico
1
Club Deportivo la Asunción, Metepec, Mexico
9 February 2017
Hard

Chile
2

			1	2	3
1	(Mexico) (Chile)	Marcela Zacarías; Bárbara Gatica	6; 3	6; 1
2	(Mexico) (Chile)	Renata Zarazúa; Daniela Seguel	1; 6	3; 6
3	(Mexico) (Chile)	Giuliana Olmos / Marcela Zacarías; Bárbara Gatica / Daniela Seguel	4; 6	3; 6

=== Brazil vs. Chile ===
Brazil
1
Club Deportivo la Asunción, Metepec, Mexico
10 February 2017
Hard

Chile
2

			1	2	3
1	(Brazil) (Chile)	Gabriela Cé; Bárbara Gatica	2; 6	6; 3	6; 0
2	(Brazil) (Chile)	Teliana Pereira; Daniela Seguel	5; 7	5; 7
3	(Brazil) (Chile)	Gabriela Cé / Teliana Pereira; Bárbara Gatica / Daniela Seguel	6^{3} 7^{7}	6; 0	1; 6

=== Mexico vs. Colombia ===
Mexico
2
Club Deportivo la Asunción, Metepec, Mexico
10 February 2017
Hard

Colombia
1

			1	2	3
1	(Mexico) (Colombia)	Giuliana Olmos; Camila Osorio	6; 3	6; 1
2	(Mexico) (Colombia)	Renata Zarazúa; Mariana Duque Mariño	2; 6	1; 6
3	(Mexico) (Colombia)	Giuliana Olmos / Renata Zarazúa; Mariana Duque Mariño / Camila Osorio	6; 2	6; 3
