= 2017 Fed Cup Europe/Africa Zone Group III – Pool A =

Subsection of tennis competition

Pool A of the 2017 Fed Cup Europe/Africa Group III was one of four pools in the Europe/Africa Group III of the 2017 Fed Cup. Three teams competed in a round robin competition, with the top team and bottom teams proceeding to their respective section of the play-offs: the top team played for advancement to Group II.

== Standings ==
| | | GRE | MLT | ARM | RR; W–L | Set; W–L | Game; W–L | Standings |
| 70 | Greece | | 2–1 | 3–0 | 2–0 | 10–4 (71%) | 79–56 (59%) | 1 |
| 93 | Malta | 1–2 | | 3–0 | 1–1 | 9–4 (69%) | 69–46 (60%) | 2 |
| 84 | Armenia | 0–3 | 0–3 | | 0–2 | 1–12 (8%) | 33–79 (29%) | 3 |

Standings are determined by: 1. number of wins; 2. if two teams have the same number of wins, head-to-head record; 3. if three teams have the same number of wins, (a) number of matches won in the group, then (b) percentage of sets won in the group, then (c) percentage of games won in the group, then (d) Fed Cup rankings.

== Round-robin ==
=== Armenia vs. Malta ===
Armenia
0
National Tennis School & Tennis Club Acvila, Chișinău, Moldova
13 June 2017
Clay

Malta
3

| | | | 1 | 2 | 3 |
|---|---|---|---|---|---|
| 1 | (Armenia) (Malta) | Anna Movsisyan; Helene Pellicano | 0; 6 | 3; 6 |
| 2 | (Armenia) (Malta) | Gabriella Akopyan; Elaine Genovese | 1; 6 | 0; 6 |
| 3 | (Armenia) (Malta) | Marina Davtyan / Anna Movsisyan; Elaine Genovese / Helene Pellicano | 4; 6 | 2; 6 |

=== Greece vs. Malta ===
Greece
2
National Tennis School & Tennis Club Acvila, Chișinău, Moldova
14 June 2017
Clay

Malta
1

| | | | 1 | 2 | 3 |
|---|---|---|---|---|---|
| 1 | (Greece) (Malta) | Eleni Kordolaimi; Helene Pellicano | 7^{7} 6^{3} | 6; 2 |
| 2 | (Greece) (Malta) | Valentini Grammatikopoulou; Elaine Genovese | 4; 6 | 7; 5 | 6; 2 |
| 3 | (Greece) (Malta) | Eleni Kordolaimi / Danai Petroula; Francesca Curmi / Helene Pellicano | 4; 6 | 2; 6 |

=== Greece vs. Armenia ===
Greece
3
National Tennis School & Tennis Club Acvila, Chișinău, Moldova
15 June 2017
Clay

Armenia
0

| | | | 1 | 2 | 3 |
|---|---|---|---|---|---|
| 1 | (Greece) (Armenia) | Danai Petroula; Marina Davtyan | 6; 3 | 6^{5} 7^{7} | 6; 2 |
| 2 | (Greece) (Armenia) | Eleni Kordolaimi; Gabriella Akopyan | 6; 2 | 6; 0 |
| 3 | (Greece) (Armenia) | Valentini Grammatikopoulou / Danai Petroula; Marina Davtyan / Anna Movsisyan | 7; 5 | 6; 4 |

== See also ==
- Fed Cup structure
