= 2017 Fed Cup Americas Zone Group II – Pool C =

Subsection of tennis competition

Pool C of the 2017 Fed Cup Americas Group II was one of four pools in the Americas Group II of the 2017 Fed Cup. Three teams competed in a round robin competition, with the top team and bottom teams proceeding to their respective sections of the play-offs: the top team played for advancement to Group I.

== Standings ==
| | | PUR | TTO | HON | RR; W–L | Set; W–L | Game; W–L | Standings |
| 52 | Puerto Rico | | 2–1 | 3–0 | 2–0 | 10–3 (77%) | 68–35 (66%) | 1 |
| 65 | Trinidad and Tobago | 1–2 | | 2–1 | 1–1 | 6–8 (43%) | 46–69 (40%) | 2 |
| 86 | Honduras | 0–3 | 1–2 | | 0–2 | 5–10 (33%) | 58–68 (46%) | 3 |

Standings are determined by: 1. number of wins; 2. number of matches; 3. in two-team ties, head-to-head records; 4. in three-team ties, (a) percentage of sets won (head-to-head records if two teams remain tied), then (b) percentage of games won (head-to-head records if two teams remain tied), then (c) Fed Cup rankings.

== Round-robin ==
=== Trinidad and Tobago vs. Honduras ===
Trinidad and Tobago
2
Centro de Alto Rendimiento Fred Maduro, Panama City, Panama
19 July 2017
Clay

Honduras
1

| | | | 1 | 2 | 3 |
|---|---|---|---|---|---|
| 1 | (Trinidad and Tobago) (Honduras) | Breana Stampfli; Daniela Obando | 0; 6 | 7^{7} 6^{5} | 6; 2 |
| 2 | (Trinidad and Tobago) (Honduras) | Anneliese Rose; Natalie Gabriela Espinal Sánchez | 1; 6 | 2; 6 |
| 3 | (Trinidad and Tobago) (Honduras) | Anneliese Rose / Breana Stampfli; Daniela Obando / Ana Gabriela Zavala Mata | 6; 2 | 4; 6 | 6; 3 |

=== Puerto Rico vs. Honduras ===
Puerto Rico
3
Centro de Alto Rendimiento Fred Maduro, Panama City, Panama
20 July 2017
Clay

Honduras
0

| | | | 1 | 2 | 3 |
|---|---|---|---|---|---|
| 1 | (Puerto Rico) (Honduras) | Mónica Matías; Natalie Gabriela Espinal Sánchez | 6; 3 | 0; 6 | 6; 4 |
| 2 | (Puerto Rico) (Honduras) | Monica Puig; Alejandra Obando | 6; 1 | 6; 0 |
| 3 | (Puerto Rico) (Honduras) | Lauren Anzalotta Kynoch / Chantal Martínez Blanco; Daniela Obando / Ana Gabriela Zavala Mata | 6; 3 | 6; 4 |

=== Puerto Rico vs. Trinidad and Tobago ===
Puerto Rico
2
Centro de Alto Rendimiento Fred Maduro, Panama City, Panama
21 July 2017
Clay

Trinidad and Tobago
1

| | | | 1 | 2 | 3 |
|---|---|---|---|---|---|
| 1 | (Puerto Rico) (Trinidad and Tobago) | Mónica Matías; Breana Stampfli | 6; 2 | 6; 2 |
| 2 | (Puerto Rico) (Trinidad and Tobago) | Monica Puig; Anneliese Rose | 6; 0 | 6; 0 |
| 3 | (Puerto Rico) (Trinidad and Tobago) | Lauren Anzalotta Kynoch / Chantal Martínez Blanco; Anneliese Rose / Breana Stampfli | 4; 6 | 4; 6 |

== See also ==
- Fed Cup structure
