= 2017 Fed Cup =

International women's tennis competition

Details
- Duration: 11 February – 12 November
- Edition: 55th

Achievements (singles)

The 2017 Fed Cup was the 55th edition of the most important tournament between national teams in women's tennis. The final took place on 11–12 November and was won by the United States .

== World Group ==
Participating teams
Belarus	Czech Republic	France	Germany
Netherlands	Spain	Switzerland	United States

=== Seeds ===
1. Czech Republic (semifinals)
2. France (first round)
3. Germany (first round)
4. Netherlands (first round)

=== Draw ===
Quarterfinals; 11–12 February
Ostrava, Czech Republic (hard, indoor)
1	Czech Republic	3
Spain	2
Maui, Hawaii, United States (hard, outdoor)
3	Germany	0
United States	4
Minsk, Belarus (hard, indoor)
Belarus	4
4	Netherlands	1
Geneva, Switzerland (hard, indoor)
Switzerland	4
2	France	1

Semifinals; 22–23 April
Tampa, United States (clay, outdoor)
1	Czech Republic	2
United States	3
Minsk, Belarus (hard, indoor)
Belarus	3
Switzerland	2

Final; 11–12 November
Minsk, Belarus (hard, indoor)
United States	3
Belarus	2

=== Final ===
==== Belarus vs. United States ====
Belarus
2
Chizhovka-Arena, Minsk, Belarus
11–12 November 2017
Hard (indoors)

United States
3

			1	2	3
1	(Belarus) (United States)	Aliaksandra Sasnovich; Coco Vandeweghe	4; 6	4; 6
2	(Belarus) (United States)	Aryna Sabalenka; Sloane Stephens	6; 3	3; 6	6; 4
3	(Belarus) (United States)	Aryna Sabalenka; Coco Vandeweghe	6^{5} 7^{7}	1; 6
4	(Belarus) (United States)	Aliaksandra Sasnovich; Sloane Stephens	4; 6	6; 1	8; 6
5	(Belarus) (United States)	Aryna Sabalenka / Aliaksandra Sasnovich; Shelby Rogers / Coco Vandeweghe	3; 6	6^{3} 7^{7}

== World Group play-offs ==
The four losing teams in the World Group first round ties, and four winners of the World Group II ties entered the draw for the World Group play-offs. Four seeded teams, based on the latest Fed Cup ranking, were drawn against four unseeded teams.

Participating teams
Belgium	France	Germany	Netherlands
Russia	Slovakia	Spain	Ukraine

=== Seeds ===
1. France
2. Russia
3. Germany
4. Netherlands

Venue	Surface	Home team	Score	Visiting team
Roanne, France	Clay (i)	France	4–0	Spain
Moscow, Russia	Clay (i)	Russia	2–3	Belgium
Stuttgart, Germany	Clay (i)	Germany	3–2	Ukraine
Bratislava, Slovakia	Clay (i)	Slovakia	2–3	Netherlands

== World Group II ==
The World Group II was the second highest level of Fed Cup competition in 2017. Winners advanced to the World Group play-offs, and losers played in the World Group II play-offs.

Participating teams
Australia	Belgium	Chinese Taipei	Italy
Romania	Russia	Slovakia	Ukraine

=== Seeds ===
1. Russia
2. Italy (World Group II play-off)
3. Australia (World Group II play-off)
4. Romania (World Group II play-off)

Venue	Surface	Home team	Score	Visiting team
Moscow, Russia	Hard (i)	Russia	4–1	Chinese Taipei
Bucharest, Romania	Hard (i)	Romania	1–3	Belgium
Kharkiv, Ukraine	Hard (i)	Ukraine	3–1	Australia
Forlì, Italy	Clay (i)	Italy	2–3	Slovakia

== World Group II play-offs ==
The four losing teams in World Group II play off against qualifiers from Zonal Group I.

Participating teams
Australia	Canada	Chinese Taipei	Great Britain
Italy	Kazakhstan	Romania	Serbia

=== Seeds ===
1. Italy
2. Romania
3. Australia
4. Canada

Venue	Surface	Home team	Score	Visiting team
Barletta, Italy	Clay	Italy	3–1	Chinese Taipei
Mamaia, Romania	Clay	Romania	3–2	Great Britain
Zrenjanin, Serbia	Hard (i)	Serbia	0–4	Australia
Montreal, Canada	Hard (i)	Canada	3–2	Kazakhstan

== Americas Zone ==
=== Group I ===
Location: Club Deportivo la Asunción, Metepec, Mexico (outdoor hard)

Dates: 6–11 February

Participating teams

Pool A

- Bolivia
- Canada
- Paraguay
- Venezuela

Pool B

- Argentina
- Brazil
- Chile
- Colombia
- Mexico

==== Play-offs ====
- Canada was promoted to the 2017 Fed Cup World Group II play-offs.
- Mexico and Bolivia were relegated to Americas Zone Group II in 2018.

=== Group II ===
Venue: Centro de Alto Rendimiento Fred Maduro, Panama City, Panama (outdoor clay)

Dates: 19–22 July

Participating teams

Pool A

- Cuba
- Ecuador
- Uruguay

Pool B

- Barbados
- Dominican Republic
- Guatemala

Pool C

- Honduras
- Puerto Rico
- Trinidad and Tobago

Pool D

- Bahamas
- Costa Rica
- Panama
- Peru

Inactive teams

- Antigua and Barbuda
- Bermuda
- El Salvador
- Eastern Caribbean
- Haiti
- Jamaica

==== Play-offs ====
- Guatemala and Puerto Rico were promoted to Americas Zone Group I in 2018.

== Asia/Oceania Zone ==
=== Group I ===
Venue: Daulet National Tennis Centre, Astana, Kazakhstan (indoor hard)

Dates: 8–11 February

Participating teams

Pool A

- Kazakhstan
- South Korea
- Thailand

Pool B

- China
- India
- Japan
- Philippines

==== Play-offs ====
- Kazakhstan was promoted to the 2017 Fed Cup World Group II play-offs.
- Philippines were relegated to Asia/Oceania Zone Group II in 2018.

=== Group II ===
Venue: Pamir Stadium, Dushanbe, Tajikistan (outdoor hard)

Dates: 18–23 July

Participating teams

Pool A

- New Zealand
- Turkmenistan
- Uzbekistan

Pool B

- Hong Kong
- Iran
- Pacific Oceania

Pool C

- Malaysia
- Pakistan
- Singapore

Pool D

- Indonesia
- Kyrgyzstan
- Sri Lanka
- Tajikistan

Withdrawn

- Bahrain

Inactive teams

- Brunei
- Iraq
- Jordan
- Lebanon
- Oman
- Syria
- Vietnam

==== Play-offs ====
- Hong Kong was promoted to Asia/Oceania Zone Group I in 2018.

== Europe/Africa Zone ==
=== Group I ===
Venue: Tallink Tennis Centre, Tallinn, Estonia (indoor hard)

Dates: 8–11 February

Participating teams

Pool A

- Austria
- Georgia
- Poland

Pool C

- Great Britain
- Latvia
- Portugal
- Turkey

Pool B

- Bosnia and Herzegovina
- Croatia
- Hungary

Pool D

- Bulgaria
- Estonia
- Israel
- Serbia

==== Play-offs ====
- Great Britain and Serbia were promoted to the 2017 Fed Cup World Group II play-offs.
- Israel and Bosnia and Herzegovina were relegated to Europe/Africa Zone Group II in 2018.

=== Group II ===
Venue: Šiauliai Tennis School, Šiauliai, Lithuania (indoor hard)

Dates: 19–22 April

Participating teams

Pool A

- Norway
- Slovenia
- South Africa
- Sweden

Pool B

- Denmark
- Egypt
- Lithuania
- Luxembourg

==== Play-offs ====
- Slovenia and Sweden were promoted to Europe/Africa Zone Group I in 2018.
- Lithuania and South Africa were relegated to Europe/Africa Zone Group III in 2018.

=== Group III ===
Venue: National Tennis School & Tennis Club Acvila, Chișinău, Moldova (outdoor clay)

Dates: 13–17 June

Participating teams

Pool A

- Armenia
- Greece
- Malta

Pool C

- Cameroon
- Finland
- Macedonia
- Tunisia

Pool B

- Cyprus
- Iceland
- Ireland
- Kenya

Pool D

- Algeria
- Moldova
- Morocco
- Mozambique

Withdrawn

- Kosovo
- Liechtenstein
- Madagascar
- Montenegro

Inactive teams

- Azerbaijan
- Botswana
- Congo
- Ethiopia
- Lesotho
- Mauritius
- Namibia
- San Marino
- Senegal
- Zimbabwe

==== Play-offs ====
- Greece and Moldova were promoted to Europe/Africa Zone Group II in 2018.
