= 2019 Fed Cup Americas Zone Group II – Pool A (Santo Domingo) =

Subsection of tennis competition

Pool A (Santo Domingo) of the 2019 Fed Cup Americas Group II was one of three pools in the Americas Group II of the 2019 Fed Cup. Five teams competed in a round robin competition, with the top team winning advancement to Group I.

== Standings ==
		VEN	GUA	URU	DOM	CUB	RR; W–L	Set; W–L	Game; W–L	Standings
2	Venezuela		2–1	3–0	3–0	3–0	4–0	22–3 (88%)	138–53 (72%)	1
3	Guatemala	1–2		3–0	3–0	3–0	3–1	20–8 (71%)	143–88 (62%)	2
10	Uruguay	0–3	0–3		2–1	2–1	2–2	12–18 (40%)	114–136 (46%)	3
8	Dominican Republic	0–3	0–3	1–2		2–0	1–3	10–18 (36%)	94–135 (41%)	4
5	Cuba	0–3	0–3	1–2	0–2		0–4	5–20 (13%)	58–135 (30%)	5

Standings are determined by: 1. number of wins; 2. number of matches; 3. in two-team ties, head-to-head records; 4. in three-team ties, (a) percentage of sets won (head-to-head records if two teams remain tied), then (b) percentage of games won (head-to-head records if two teams remain tied), then (c) Fed Cup rankings.

== Round-robin ==
=== Venezuela vs. Uruguay ===
Venezuela
3
Centro Nacional de Tenis, Santo Domingo, Dominican Republic
Hard
16 April 2019

Uruguay
0

			1	2	3
1	(Venezuela) (Uruguay)	Aymet Uzcátegui; Guillermina Grant	4; 6	6; 1	6; 4
2	(Venezuela) (Uruguay)	Andrea Gámiz; Lucía de Santa Ana	6; 0	6; 1
3	(Venezuela) (Uruguay)	Andrea Gámiz / Aymet Uzcátegui; Lucía de Santa Ana / Guillermina Grant	6; 1	6; 1

=== Guatemala vs. Dominican Republic ===
Guatemala
3
Centro Nacional de Tenis, Santo Domingo, Dominican Republic
Hard
16 April 2019

Dominican Republic
0

			1	2	3
1	(Guatemala) (Dominican Republic)	Melissa Morales; Laura Lissette Quezada Martínez	6; 0	6; 3
2	(Guatemala) (Dominican Republic)	Kirsten-Andrea Weedon; Kelly Williford	4; 6	6; 3	6; 4
3	(Guatemala) (Dominican Republic)	Rut Galindo / María Gabriela Rivera Corado; Ana Julissa de Mata / Ana Carmen Zamburek	6; 2	3; 6	6; 0

=== Guatemala vs. Cuba ===
Guatemala
3
Centro Nacional de Tenis, Santo Domingo, Dominican Republic
Hard
17 April 2019

Cuba
0

			1	2	3
1	(Guatemala) (Cuba)	Melissa Morales; Isid Hernández	7; 5	6; 1
2	(Guatemala) (Cuba)	Kirsten-Andrea Weedon; Yoryana Delgado Herrera	6; 0	6; 0
3	(Guatemala) (Cuba)	Rut Galindo / María Gabriela Rivera Corado; Yoryana Delgado Herrera / Isid Hernández	6; 0	6; 2

=== Dominican Republic vs. Uruguay ===
Dominican Republic
1
Centro Nacional de Tenis, Santo Domingo, Dominican Republic
Hard
17 April 2019

Uruguay
2

			1	2	3
1	(Dominican Republic) (Uruguay)	Ana Julissa de Mata; Guillermina Grant	6; 4	1; 6	2; 6
2	(Dominican Republic) (Uruguay)	Kelly Williford; Lucía de Santa Ana	1; 6	6; 0	6; 3
3	(Dominican Republic) (Uruguay)	Laura Lissette Quezada Martínez / Kelly Williford; Lucía de Santa Ana / Guillermina Grant	3; 6	6; 1	0; 6

=== Venezuela vs. Dominican Republic ===
Venezuela
3
Centro Nacional de Tenis, Santo Domingo, Dominican Republic
Hard
18 April 2019

Dominican Republic
0

			1	2	3
1	(Venezuela) (Dominican Republic)	Aymet Uzcátegui; Nika Khmolovska	6; 0	6; 1
2	(Venezuela) (Dominican Republic)	Andrea Gámiz; Ana Carmen Zamburek	6; 2	6; 3
3	(Venezuela) (Dominican Republic)	Luniuska Delgado / Aymet Uzcátegui; Ana Julissa de Mata / Kelly Williford	6; 0	6; 3

=== Cuba vs. Uruguay ===
Cuba
1
Centro Nacional de Tenis, Santo Domingo, Dominican Republic
Hard
18 April 2019

Uruguay
2

			1	2	3
1	(Cuba) (Uruguay)	Isid Hernández; Guillermina Grant	4; 6	1; 6
2	(Cuba) (Uruguay)	Yoryana Delgado Herrera; Lucía de Santa Ana	7; 5	6; 3
3	(Cuba) (Uruguay)	Yoryana Delgado Herrera / Isid Hernández; Lucía de Santa Ana / Guillermina Grant	0; 6	2; 6

=== Venezuela vs. Cuba ===
Venezuela
3
Centro Nacional de Tenis, Santo Domingo, Dominican Republic
Hard
19 April 2019

Cuba
0

			1	2	3
1	(Venezuela) (Cuba)	Aymet Uzcátegui; Isid Hernández	6; 4	6; 1
2	(Venezuela) (Cuba)	Andrea Gámiz; Yoryana Delgado Herrera	6; 4	6; 0
3	(Venezuela) (Cuba)	Sofía Elena Cabezas Domínguez / Aymet Uzcátegui; Isid Hernández / Yeleidis Luzardo	6; 2	6; 1

=== Guatemala vs. Uruguay ===
Guatemala
3
Centro Nacional de Tenis, Santo Domingo, Dominican Republic
Hard
19 April 2019

Uruguay
0

			1	2	3
1	(Guatemala) (Uruguay)	Melissa Morales; Guillermina Grant	7; 5	5; 7	6; 4
2	(Guatemala) (Uruguay)	Kirsten-Andrea Weedon; Lucía de Santa Ana	6; 1	6; 1
3	(Guatemala) (Uruguay)	Rut Galindo / María Gabriela Rivera Corado; Agustina Cuestas / Guillermina Grant	6; 2	3; 6	6; 4

=== Venezuela vs. Guatemala ===
Venezuela
2
Centro Nacional de Tenis, Santo Domingo, Dominican Republic
Hard
20 April 2019

Guatemala
1

			1	2	3
1	(Venezuela) (Guatemala)	Aymet Uzcátegui; Melissa Morales	2; 6	0; 6
2	(Venezuela) (Guatemala)	Andrea Gámiz; Kirsten-Andrea Weedon	6; 0	6; 1
3	(Venezuela) (Guatemala)	Andrea Gámiz / Aymet Uzcátegui; Melissa Morales / Kirsten-Andrea Weedon	6; 1	6; 4

=== Cuba vs. Dominican Republic ===
Cuba
0
Centro Nacional de Tenis, Santo Domingo, Dominican Republic
Hard
20 April 2019

Dominican Republic
2

			1	2	3
1	(Cuba) (Dominican Republic)	Isid Hernández; Ana Carmen Zamburek	7^{8} 6^{6}	4; 6	4; 6
2	(Cuba) (Dominican Republic)	Yoryana Delgado Herrera; Kelly Williford	3; 6	0; 6
3	(Cuba) (Dominican Republic)	Isid Hernández / Yeleidis Luzardo; Ana Julissa de Mata / Nika Khmolovska				not played

== See also ==
- Fed Cup structure
