= 2017 Fed Cup Asia/Oceania Zone Group I – play-offs =

Subsection of tennis competition

The play-offs of the 2017 Fed Cup Asia/Oceania Zone Group I were the final stages of the Group I Zonal Competition involving teams from Asia and Oceania. Using the positions determined in their pools, the six teams faced off to determine their placing in the 2017 Fed Cup Asia/Oceania Zone Group I. Kazakhstan advanced to World Group II play-offs, and Philippines was relegated to the Asia/Oceania Zone Group II in 2018.

== Pool results ==
Placing	Pool A	Pool B
1	Kazakhstan	Japan
2	South Korea	China
3	—	India
4	Thailand	Philippines

== Promotion play-off ==
The first placed teams of the two pools were drawn in head-to-head rounds. The winner advanced to the World Group II play-offs.

=== Kazakhstan vs. Japan ===
Kazakhstan
2
Daulet National Tennis Centre, Astana, Kazakhstan
11 February 2017
Hard (indoors)

Japan
1

			1	2	3
1	(Kazakhstan) (Japan)	Galina Voskoboeva; Naomi Osaka	6; 1	2; 6	3; 6
2	(Kazakhstan) (Japan)	Yulia Putintseva; Misaki Doi	7^{7} 6^{4}	6; 2
3	(Kazakhstan) (Japan)	Yaroslava Shvedova / Galina Voskoboeva; Shuko Aoyama / Eri Hozumi	6; 3	7^{7} 6^{2}

== 3rd place play-off ==
The second placed teams of the two pools were drawn in head-to-head rounds to find third place teams.

=== China vs. South Korea ===
China
2
Daulet National Tennis Centre, Astana, Kazakhstan
11 February 2017
Hard (indoors)

South Korea
0

			1	2	3
1	(China) (South Korea)	Yang Zhaoxuan; Choi Ji-hee	6; 0	6; 0
2	(China) (South Korea)	Zhu Lin; Han Na-lae	7^{8} 6^{6}	5; 7	7; 5
3	(China) (South Korea)	Yang Zhaoxuan / Zhang Kailin; Choi Ji-hee / Kim Na-ri				not played

== Relegation play-off ==
The last placed teams of the two pools were drawn in head-to-head rounds. The loser was relegated to Asia/Oceania Zone Group II in 2018.

=== Thailand vs. Philippines ===
Thailand
2
Daulet National Tennis Centre, Astana, Kazakhstan
11 February 2017
Hard (indoors)

Philippines
0

			1	2	3
1	(Thailand) (Philippines)	Peangtarn Plipuech; Khim Iglupas	6; 0	6; 0
2	(Thailand) (Philippines)	Luksika Kumkhum; Katharina Lehnert	6; 2	5; 7	6; 3
3	(Thailand) (Philippines)	Kamonwan Buayam / Nicha Lertpitaksinchai; Khim Iglupas / Anna Clarice Patrimonio				not played

== Final placements ==
Placing	Teams
Promoted/First	Kazakhstan
Second	Japan
Third	China
Fourth	South Korea
Fifth	India
Sixth	Thailand
Relegated/Seventh	Philippines

- Kazakhstan advanced to World Group II play-offs.
- Philippines was relegated to Asia/Oceania Group II in 2018.

== See also ==
- Fed Cup structure
