= 2017 Fed Cup Americas Zone Group II – Pool A =

Subsection of tennis competition

Pool A of the 2017 Fed Cup Americas Group II was one of four pools in the Americas Group II of the 2017 Fed Cup. Three teams competed in a round robin competition, with the top team and bottom teams proceeding to their respective sections of the play-offs: the top team played for advancement to Group I.

== Standings ==
		ECU	CUB	URU	RR; W–L	Set; W–L	Game; W–L	Standings
43	Ecuador		2–1	2–1	2–0	10–5 (67%)	67–55 (55%)	1
NR	Cuba	1–2		2–1	1–1	7–8 (47%)	61–62 (50%)	2
62	Uruguay	1–2	1–2		0–2	5–9 (36%)	53–64 (45%)	3

Standings are determined by: 1. number of wins; 2. number of matches; 3. in two-team ties, head-to-head records; 4. in three-team ties, (a) percentage of sets won (head-to-head records if two teams remain tied), then (b) percentage of games won (head-to-head records if two teams remain tied), then (c) Fed Cup rankings.

== Round-robin ==
=== Uruguay vs. Cuba ===
Uruguay
1
Centro de Alto Rendimiento Fred Maduro, Panama City, Panama
19 July 2017
Clay

Cuba
2

			1	2	3
1	(Uruguay) (Cuba)	Guillermina Grant; Yusleydis Smith Dias	6; 4	1; 6	2; 6
2	(Uruguay) (Cuba)	Florencia Rossi; Isid Hernández	6; 2	6; 2
3	(Uruguay) (Cuba)	Florencia Rossi / Fernanda Secinaro; Yamile Fors Guerra / Yusleydis Smith Dias	4; 6	2; 6

=== Ecuador vs. Cuba ===
Ecuador
2
Centro de Alto Rendimiento Fred Maduro, Panama City, Panama
20 July 2017
Clay

Cuba
1

			1	2	3
1	(Ecuador) (Cuba)	Luisa Uscocovich; Yusleydis Smith Dias	6; 3	2; 6	1; 6
2	(Ecuador) (Cuba)	Camila Romero; Isid Hernández	6; 0	6; 1
3	(Ecuador) (Cuba)	Camila Romero / Luisa Uscocovich; Yamile Fors Guerra / Yusleydis Smith Dias	2; 6	6; 3	6; 4

=== Ecuador vs. Uruguay ===
Ecuador
2
Centro de Alto Rendimiento Fred Maduro, Panama City, Panama
21 July 2017
Clay

Uruguay
1

			1	2	3
1	(Ecuador) (Uruguay)	Mikaela Molina Bugarija; Florencia Rossi	6; 1	1; 6	1; 6
2	(Ecuador) (Uruguay)	Camila Romero; Fernando Secinaro	6; 4	6; 2
3	(Ecuador) (Uruguay)	Camila Romero / Luisa Uscocovich; Guillermina Grant / Florencia Rossi	6; 3	6; 4

== See also ==
- Fed Cup structure
