= 2017 Fed Cup Americas Zone Group II – Pool D =

Subsection of tennis competition

Pool D of the 2017 Fed Cup Americas Group II was one of four pools in the Americas Group II of the 2017 Fed Cup. Four teams competed in a round robin competition, with the top team and bottom teams proceeding to their respective sections of the play-offs: the top team played for advancement to Group I.

== Standings ==
		PER	CRC	BAH	PAN	RR; W–L	Set; W–L	Game; W–L	Standings
55	Peru		3–0	3–0	3–0	3–0	18–1 (95%)	109–21 (84%)	1
67	Costa Rica	0–3		3–0	2–1	2–1	12–9 (57%)	98–75 (57%)	2
75	Bahamas	0–3	0–3		2–1	1–2	5–14 (26%)	52–91 (36%)	3
97	Panama	0–3	1–2	1–2		0–3	5–16 (24%)	44–116 (28%)	4

Standings are determined by: 1. number of wins; 2. number of matches; 3. in two-team ties, head-to-head records; 4. in three-team ties, (a) percentage of sets won (head-to-head records if two teams remain tied), then (b) percentage of games won (head-to-head records if two teams remain tied), then (c) Fed Cup rankings.

== Round-robin ==
=== Peru vs. Panama ===
Peru
3
Centro de Alto Rendimiento Fred Maduro, Panama City, Panama
19 July 2017
Clay

Panama
0

			1	2	3
1	(Peru) (Panama)	Ferny Ángeles Paz; Rosaline Zafir Chávez Tello	6; 0	6; 1
2	(Peru) (Panama)	Dominique Schaefer; Karen Esther Contreras	6; 1	6; 0
3	(Peru) (Panama)	Bianca Botto / Anastasia Iamachkine; Aranza Lailu Benítez Ellis / Daniela Díez	6; 0	6; 0

=== Costa Rica vs. Bahamas ===
Costa Rica
3
Centro de Alto Rendimiento Fred Maduro, Panama City, Panama
19 July 2017
Clay

Bahamas
0

			1	2	3
1	(Costa Rica) (The Bahamas)	Ariana Rahmanparast; Sydney Clarke	6; 0	6; 1
2	(Costa Rica) (The Bahamas)	Eugenia Camacho; Iesha Shepherd	6; 3	7^{7} 6^{4}
3	(Costa Rica) (The Bahamas)	Eugenia Camacho / Ariana Rahmanparast; Sierra Donaldson / Iesha Shepherd	6; 1	6; 3

=== Peru vs. Bahamas ===
Peru
3
Centro de Alto Rendimiento Fred Maduro, Panama City, Panama
20 July 2017
Clay

Bahamas
0

			1	2	3
1	(Peru) (The Bahamas)	Bianca Botto; Sydney Clarke	6; 0	6; 0
2	(Peru) (The Bahamas)	Ferny Ángeles Paz; Iesha Shepherd	6; 0	6; 0
3	(Peru) (The Bahamas)	Bianca Botto / Anastasia Iamachkine; Sierra Donaldson / Elana Mackey	6; 0	6; 0

=== Costa Rica vs. Panama ===
Costa Rica
2
Centro de Alto Rendimiento Fred Maduro, Panama City, Panama
20 July 2017
Clay

Panama
1

			1	2	3
1	(Costa Rica) (Panama)	Ariana Rahmanparast; Aranza Lailu Benítez Ellis	6; 0	6; 1
2	(Costa Rica) (Panama)	Eugenia Camacho; Rosaline Zefir Chávez Tello	6; 3	0; 6	6^{3} 7^{7}
3	(Costa Rica) (Panama)	Tania Lea Aizenman Sánchez / Ariana Rahmanparast; Rosaline Zefir Chávez Tello / Daniela Díez	6^{10} 7^{12}	6; 0	6; 0

=== Peru vs. Costa Rica ===
Peru
3
Centro de Alto Rendimiento Fred Maduro, Panama City, Panama
21 July 2017
Clay

Costa Rica
0

			1	2	3
1	(Peru) (Costa Rica)	Anastasia Iamachkine; Ariana Rahmanparast	6; 0	1; 6	6; 4
2	(Peru) (Costa Rica)	Dominique Schaefer; Eugenia Camacho	6; 2	6; 1
3	(Peru) (Costa Rica)	Ferny Ángeles Paz / Bianca Botto; Tania Lea Aizenman Sánchez / Eugenia Camacho	6; 2	6; 4

=== Bahamas vs. Panama ===
Bahamas
2
Centro de Alto Rendimiento Fred Maduro, Panama City, Panama
21 July 2017
Clay

Panama
1

			1	2	3
1	(The Bahamas) (Panama)	Sydney Clarke; Rosaline Zafir Chávez Tello	6; 1	5; 7	3; 6
2	(The Bahamas) (Panama)	Iesha Shepherd; Karen Esther Contreras	6; 1	6; 0
3	(The Bahamas) (Panama)	Sydney Clarke / Iesha Shepherd; Rosaline Zafir Chávez Tello / Daniela Díez	6; 2	6; 1

== See also ==
- Fed Cup structure
