= Daulet National Tennis Centre =

Sports venue in Kazakhstan

- Interactive map of Daulet National Tennis Centre
- Location: Astana, Kazakhstan
- Coordinates: 51°09′09″N 71°25′13″E
- Owner: City of Astana
- Operator: Kazakhstan Tennis Federation
- Capacity: 2,700

Construction
- Opened: 8 July 2008

Tenants
- Kazakhstan Fed Cup team Kazakhstan Davis Cup team

The Daulet National Tennis Centre (Kazakh: "Дәулет" Ұлттық Теннис Орталығы, romanized: "Däulet" Ūlttyq Tennis Ortalyğy; Russian: Национальный Теннисный Центр "Даулет", romanized: Natsional'nyy Tennisnyy Tsentr "Daulet") is a sports venue that is part of the National Tennis Centre at Central Park in Astana, Kazakhstan.
