= 2017 Fed Cup World Group II play-offs =

Part of tennis tournament

The World Group II play-offs were four ties which involved the losing nations of the World Group II and four nations from the three Zonal Group I competitions. Nations that won their play-off ties entered the 2018 World Group II, while losing nations joined their respective zonal groups.

Participating Teams
Australia	Canada	Chinese Taipei	Great Britain
Italy	Kazakhstan	Romania	Serbia

== Italy vs. Chinese Taipei ==
Italy
3
Circolo Tennis Barletta, Barletta, Italy
22–23 April 2017
Clay

Chinese Taipei
1

			1	2	3
1	(Italy) (Chinese Taipei)	Martina Trevisan; Lee Ya-hsuan	2; 6	6; 3	12; 10
2	(Italy) (Chinese Taipei)	Sara Errani; Hsu Chieh-yu	6; 0	6; 2
3	(Italy) (Chinese Taipei)	Sara Errani; Lee Ya-hsuan	3; 6	6; 2	6; 3
4	(Italy) (Chinese Taipei)	Martina Trevisan; Hsu Chieh-yu				not played
5	(Italy) (Chinese Taipei)	Jasmine Paolini / Camilla Rosatello; Chuang Chia-jung / Hsu Ching-wen	4; 6	4; 6

== Romania vs. Great Britain ==
Romania
3
Tenis Club IDU, Constanța, Romania
22–23 April 2017
Clay

Great Britain
2

			1	2	3
1	(Romania) (United Kingdom)	Simona Halep; Heather Watson	6; 4	6; 1
2	(Romania) (United Kingdom)	Sorana Cîrstea; Johanna Konta	2; 6	3; 6
3	(Romania) (United Kingdom)	Simona Halep; Johanna Konta	6; 1	6; 3
4	(Romania) (United Kingdom)	Irina-Camelia Begu; Heather Watson	6; 4	7; 5
5	(Romania) (United Kingdom)	Simona Halep / Monica Niculescu; Jocelyn Rae / Laura Robson	3; 6	6; 1	8; 10

== Serbia vs. Australia ==
Serbia
0
Kristalna Dvorana Sports Hall, Zrenjanin, Serbia
22–23 April 2017
Hard (indoors)

Australia
4

			1	2	3
1	(Serbia) (Australia)	Aleksandra Krunić; Ashleigh Barty	4; 6	3; 6
2	(Serbia) (Australia)	Ivana Jorović; Daria Gavrilova	2; 6	2; 6
3	(Serbia) (Australia)	Nina Stojanović; Daria Gavrilova	0; 6	3; 6
4	(Serbia) (Australia)	Ivana Jorović; Ashleigh Barty				not played
5	(Serbia) (Australia)	Ivana Jorović / Nina Stojanović; Ashleigh Barty / Casey Dellacqua	1; 6	5; 7

== Canada vs. Kazakhstan ==
Canada
3
Uniprix Stadium, Montreal, Canada
22–23 April 2017
Hard (indoor)

Kazakhstan
2

			1	2	3
1	(Canada) (Kazakhstan)	Bianca Andreescu; Yulia Putintseva	4; 6	6; 4	4; 6
2	(Canada) (Kazakhstan)	Françoise Abanda; Yaroslava Shvedova	6; 3	6; 4
3	(Canada) (Kazakhstan)	Françoise Abanda; Yulia Putintseva	6; 3	6; 3
4	(Canada) (Kazakhstan)	Bianca Andreescu; Yaroslava Shvedova	7^{7} 6^{1}	6; 4
5	(Canada) (Kazakhstan)	Gabriela Dabrowski / Katherine Sebov; Kamila Kerimbayeva / Galina Voskoboeva	7^{8} 6^{6}	6^{6} 7^{8}	5; 10
