= Honduras Billie Jean King Cup team =

Honduras Fed Cup team
- Captain: Elvin Obando
- ITF ranking: 100 ▼1 (16 November 2015)
- Colors: blue & white
- First year: 2007
- Years played: 4
- Ties played (W–L): 14 (1–13)
- Best finish: Zonal Group II RR
- Most total wins: Marisela Avilés (2–7); Zulema Zelaya (2–11)
- Most singles wins: Zulema Zelaya (2–6)
- Most doubles wins: Marisela Avilés (1–2); Sofía Barletta (1–2); Raquel Argeñal Matheu (1–2); Daniela Obando (1–4)
- Best doubles team: Marisela Avilés / Sofía Barletta (1–0); Raquel Argeñal Matheu / Daniela Obando (1–1)
- Most ties played: Zulema Zelaya (10)
- Most years played: Zulema Zelaya (3)

The Honduras Fed Cup team represents Honduras in Fed Cup tennis competition and are governed by the Federación Hondurena de Tenis. They have not competed since 2018.

== History ==
Honduras competed in its first Fed Cup in 2007, finishing eighth in Group II.

== Current Team ==
- Sofia Barletta
- Marisela Aviles
- Zulema Zelaya
- Maria de los Angeles Cardenas

== See also ==
- Billie Jean King Cup
- Honduras Davis Cup team
