= 2022 Billie Jean King Cup Americas Zone =

Subsection of tennis competition

The Americas Zone is one of three zones of regional competition in the 2022 Billie Jean King Cup.

== Group I ==
- Venue: Salinas Golf and Tennis Club, Salinas, Ecuador (hard)
- Date: 13–16 April 2022

The eight teams were divided into two pools of four teams. The four nations finishing 1st and 2nd in their pools took part in play-offs to determine the nations advancing to the 2022 Billie Jean King Cup play-offs. The nations finishing third and last took part in a relegation play-offs, with the losing nations relegated to Group II for 2023.

=== Seeding ===
Pot	Nation	Rank^{1}	Seed
1	Brazil	21	1
1	Paraguay	23	2
2	Argentina	25	3
2	Mexico	27	4
3	Chile	29	5
3	Colombia	31	6
4	Guatemala	44	7
4	Ecuador	48	8

- ^{1}Billie Jean King Cup Rankings as of 8 November 2021

=== Pools ===
	Pool A	BRA	ARG	COL	GUA
1	Brazil (3–0)		2–1	3–0	3–0
2	Argentina (2–1)	1–2		3–0	3–0
3	Colombia (1–2)	0–3	0–3		3–0
4	Guatemala (0–3)	0–3	0–3	0–3	

	Pool B	MEX	CHI	ECU	PAR
1	Mexico (3–0)		2–1	3–0	3–0
2	Chile (2–1)	1–2		3–0	3–0
3	Ecuador (1–2)	0–3	0–3		2–1
4	Paraguay (0–3)	0–3	0–3	1–2	

=== Play-offs ===
Placing	A Team	Score	B Team
Promotional	Brazil	2–0	Chile
Promotional	Argentina	2–0	Mexico
Relegation	Colombia	2–0	Paraguay
Relegation	Guatemala	2–1	Ecuador

=== Final placements ===
Placing	Teams	
Promoted/First	Brazil	Argentina
Third	Chile	Mexico
Fifth	Colombia	Guatemala
Seventh/Relegated	Paraguay	Ecuador

- Brazil, Argentina, and Mexico were promoted to the 2022 Billie Jean King Cup play-offs.
  - Mexico was added based on ranking (27th) when the ITF disqualified Russia and Belarus for violations of the Olympic Truce.
- Paraguay and Ecuador were relegated to Americas Zone Group II in 2023.

== Group II ==
- Venue: Centro Nacional de Tenis Parque del Este, Santo Domingo Este, Dominican Republic (hard)
- Dates: 25–30 July 2022

The seventeen teams were divided into three pools of four teams and one pool of five teams. The four nations finishing 1st in their pools took part in play-offs to determine the two nations promoted to Group I in 2023.

=== Seeding ===
Pot	Nation	Rank^{1}	Seed
1	Bahamas	53	1
1	Peru	54	2
1	Bolivia	55	3
1	Uruguay	59	4
2	Venezuela	62	5
2	Dominican Republic	65	6
2	Honduras	70	7
2	Panama	72	8
3	Costa Rica	75	9
3	Cuba	80	10
3	El Salvador	88	11
3	Puerto Rico	90	12
4	Jamaica	99	13
4	Barbados	102	14
4	Bermuda	107	15
4	Aruba	NR	–
4	U.S. Virgin Islands	NR	–

- ^{1}Billie Jean King Cup Rankings as of 19 April 2022

=== Pools ===
	Pool A	DOM	BAH	ESA	BER
1	Dominican Republic (3–0)		3–0	3–0	3–0
2	Bahamas (2–1)	0–3		3–0	3–0
3	El Salvador (1–2)	0–3	0–3		3–0
4	Bermuda (0–3)	0–3	0–3	0–3	

	Pool B	PER	VEN	CUB	ISV
1	Peru (3–0)		3–0	3–0	3–0
2	Venezuela (2–1)	0–3		3–0	3–0
3	Cuba (1–2)	0–3	0–3		3–0
4	U.S. Virgin Islands (0–3)	0–3	0–3	0–3	

	Pool C	BOL	PUR	ARU	PAN
1	Bolivia (3–0)		3–0	3–0	3–0
2	Puerto Rico (2–1)	0–3		3–0	3–0
3	Aruba (1–2)	0–3	0–3		3–0
4	Panama (0–3)	0–3	0–3	0–3	

	Pool D	URU	HON	CRC	JAM	BAR
1	Uruguay (4–0)		3–0	3–0	3–0	3–0
2	Honduras (3–1)	0–3		3–0	3–0	3–0
3	Costa Rica (2–2)	0–3	0–3		3–0	2–1
4	Jamaica (1–3)	0–3	0–3	0–3		2–1
5	Barbados (0–4)	0–3	0–3	1–2	1–2	

=== Play-offs ===
Placing	A Team	Score	C Team
Promotional	Dominican Republic	0–2	Bolivia
5th–8th	Bahamas	1–2	Puerto Rico
9th–12th	El Salvador	2–0	Aruba
13th–16th	Bermuda	0–2	Panama

Placing	B Team	Score	D Team
Promotional	Peru	2–1	Uruguay
5th–8th	Venezuela	2–0	Honduras
9th–12th	Cuba	1–2	Costa Rica
13th–16th	U.S. Virgin Islands	1–2	Jamaica
17th	—N/a		Barbados

=== Final placements ===
Placing	Teams	
Promoted/First	Bolivia	Peru
Third	Dominican Republic	Uruguay
Fifth	Puerto Rico	Venezuela
Seventh	Bahamas	Honduras
Ninth	El Salvador	Costa Rica
Eleventh	Aruba	Cuba
Thirteenth	Panama	Jamaica
Fifteenth	Bermuda	U.S. Virgin Islands
Seventeenth	Barbados	

- Bolivia and Peru were promoted to Americas Zone Group I in 2023.
