= 2022 Billie Jean King Cup Americas Zone Group I – play-offs =

Subsection of tennis competition

The play-offs of the 2022 Billie Jean King Cup Americas Zone Group I were the final stages of the Group I zonal competition involving teams from the Americas. Using the positions determined in their pools, the eight teams faced off to determine their placing in the 2022 Billie Jean King Cup Americas Zone Group I. The top two teams advanced to the 2022 Billie Jean King Cup play-offs, while the bottom two teams were relegated to Americas Zone Group II for 2023.

== Pool results ==
Placing	Pool A	Pool B
1	Brazil	Mexico
2	Argentina	Chile
3	Colombia	Ecuador
4	Guatemala	Paraguay

== Promotion play-off ==
The first and second-placed teams of each pool played against one another in head-to-head rounds. The winners of each tie advanced to the 2022 Billie Jean King Cup play-offs.

=== Brazil vs. Chile ===
Brazil
2
Salinas Golf and Tennis Club, Salinas, Ecuador
16 April 2022
Hard

Chile
0

			1	2	3
1	(Brazil) (Chile)	Laura Pigossi; Bárbara Gatica	6; 4	6; 2
2	(Brazil) (Chile)	Beatriz Haddad Maia; Daniela Seguel	6; 2	6; 3
3	(Brazil) (Chile)	Beatriz Haddad Maia / Laura Pigossi; Bárbara Gatica / Alexa Guarachi				not played

=== Mexico vs. Argentina ===
Mexico
0
Salinas Golf and Tennis Club, Salinas, Ecuador
16 April 2022
Hard

Argentina
2

			1	2	3
1	(Mexico) (Argentina)	Marcela Zacarías; Solana Sierra	5; 7	1; 6
2	(Mexico) (Argentina)	Renata Zarazúa; María Lourdes Carlé	3; 6	0; 6
3	(Mexico) (Argentina)	Fernanda Contreras Gómez / Marcela Zacarías; Jazmín Ortenzi / Julia Riera				not played

== Relegation play-offs ==
The third and last-placed teams of each pool played against one another in head-to-head rounds. The losers of each tie were relegated to Americas Zone Group II in 2023.

=== Colombia vs. Paraguay ===
Colombia
2
Salinas Golf and Tennis Club, Salinas, Ecuador
16 April 2022
Hard

Paraguay
0

			1	2	3
1	(Colombia) (Paraguay)	Yuliana Lizarazo; Leyla Fiorella Brítez Risso	5; 7	6; 4	6; 2
2	(Colombia) (Paraguay)	María Herazo González; Heydi Doldán	6; 0	6; 0
3	(Colombia) (Paraguay)	María Paulina Pérez / Antonia Samudio; Leyla Fiorella Brítez Risso / Paulina Franco Martinessi				not played

=== Guatemala vs. Ecuador ===
Guatemala
2
Salinas Golf and Tennis Club, Salinas, Ecuador
16 April 2022
Hard

Ecuador
1

			1	2	3
1	(Guatemala) (Ecuador)	Gabriela Rivera; Charlotte Römer	6; 3	6; 3
2	(Guatemala) (Ecuador)	Kirsten-Andrea Weedon; Mell Reasco	1; 6	2; 6
3	(Guatemala) (Ecuador)	Melissa Morales / Gabriela Rivera; Domenica González / Mell Reasco	6; 3	7; 5

== Final placements ==
Placing	Teams	
Promoted/First	Brazil	Argentina
Third	Chile	Mexico
Fifth	Colombia	Guatemala
Seventh/Relegated	Paraguay	Ecuador

- Brazil, Argentina, and Mexico were promoted to the 2022 Billie Jean King Cup play-offs.
  - Mexico was promoted based on ranking after Russia and Belarus were disqualified for violations of the Olympic Truce.
- Paraguay and Ecuador were relegated to Americas Zone Group II in 2023.
