= 2018 Fed Cup Americas Zone =

Subsection of tennis competition

The Americas Zone was one of three zones of regional competition in the 2018 Fed Cup.

== Group I ==
- Venue: Club Internacional de Tenis, Asunción, Paraguay (clay)
- Date: 7–10 February

The seven teams were divided into two pools of three and four teams. The two pool winners took part in a play-off to determine the nation advancing to the World Group II play-offs. The two nations finishing last and second last in their pools took part in relegation play-offs, with the two losing nations being relegated to Group II for 2019. Puerto Rico withdrew before the tournament due to the economic circumstances caused by Hurricane Maria.

=== Seeding ===
Pot	Nation	Rank^{1}	Seed
1	Paraguay	19	1
1	Argentina	20	2
2	Brazil	27	3
2	Chile	30	4
3	Colombia	38	5
3	Venezuela	41	6
3	Guatemala	45	7

- ^{1}Fed Cup Rankings as of 13 November 2017

=== Pools ===
	Pool A	PAR	COL	CHI
1	Paraguay (2–0)		3–0	2–1
2	Colombia (1–1)	0–3		3–0
3	Chile (0–2)	1–2	0–3	

	Pool B	BRA	ARG	VEN	GUA
1	Brazil (3–0)		2–1	2–1	3–0
2	Argentina (2–1)	1–2		3–0	3–0
3	Venezuela (1–2)	1–2	0–3		3–0
4	Guatemala (0–3)	0–3	0–3	0–3	

=== Play-offs ===
Placing	A Team	Score	B Team
Promotional	Paraguay	2–0	Brazil
3rd–4th	Colombia	0–2	Argentina
Relegation	Chile	2–0	Venezuela
Relegation	—		Guatemala

=== Final placements ===
Placing	Teams	
Promoted/First	Paraguay	
Second	Brazil	
Third	Argentina	
Fourth	Colombia	
Fifth	Chile	
Relegated/Sixth	Venezuela	Guatemala

- Paraguay was promoted to the 2018 Fed Cup World Group II Play-offs.
- Venezuela and Guatemala were relegated to Americas Zone Group II in 2019.

== Group II ==
- Venue 1: Club Deportivo La Asunción, Metepec, Mexico (hard)
- Venue 2: Centro Nacional de Tenis de la FET, Guayaquil, Ecuador (clay)
- Dates: 20–23 June and 18–21 July

=== Seeding ===
Pot	Nation	Rank^{1}	Seed
1	Ecuador	51	1
1	Mexico	53	2
1	Peru	56	3
1	Bolivia	65	4
2	Costa Rica	67	5
2	Trinidad and Tobago	70	6
2	Dominican Republic	71	7
2	Cuba	75	8
3	Uruguay	84	9
3	Bahamas	88	10
3	Barbados	90	11
3	Honduras	94	12
3	Bermuda	99	13

- ^{1}Fed Cup Rankings as of 23 April 2018

=== Pools ===
	Pool A (Metepec)	MEX	DOM	BAR
1	Mexico (2–0)		3–0	3–0
2	Dominican Republic (1–1)	0–3		2–1
3	Barbados (0–2)	0–3	1–2	

	Pool B (Metepec)	PER	CUB	URU
1	Peru (2–0)		2–1	3–0
2	Cuba (1–1)	1–2		2–1
3	Uruguay (0–2)	0–3	1–2	

	Pool A (Guayaquil)	ECU	CRC	HON
1	Ecuador (2–0)		3–0	3–0
2	Costa Rica (1–1)	0–3		2–1
3	Honduras (0–2)	0–3	1–2	

	Pool B (Guayaquil)	BAH	BOL	TTO	BER
1	Bahamas (3–0)		2–1	2–1	3–0
2	Bolivia (2–1)	1–2		2–1	3–0
3	Trinidad and Tobago (1–2)	1–2	1–2		3–0
4	Bermuda (0–3)	0–3	0–3	0–3	

=== Play-offs ===
Placing (Metepec)	A Team	Score	B Team
Promotional	Mexico	2–0	Peru
3rd–4th	Dominican Republic	0–2	Cuba
5th–6th	Barbados	0–3	Uruguay

Placing (Guayaquil)	A Team	Score	B Team
Promotional	Ecuador	2–0	Bahamas
3rd–4th	Costa Rica	2–1	Bolivia
5th–6th	Honduras	2–1	Trinidad and Tobago
7th	—		Bermuda

=== Final placements ===
Placing	Teams	
Promoted	Mexico	Ecuador
Second	Peru	Bahamas
Third	Cuba	Costa Rica
Fourth	Dominican Republic	Bolivia
Fifth	Uruguay	Honduras
Sixth	Barbados	Trinidad and Tobago
Seventh	Bermuda	

- Mexico and Ecuador were promoted to Americas Zone Group I in 2019.
