= 2022 Billie Jean King Cup Americas Zone Group II – play-offs =

Subsection of tennis competition

The play-offs of the 2022 Billie Jean King Cup Americas Zone Group II were the final stages of the Group II zonal competition involving teams from the Americas. Using the positions determined in their pools, the seventeen teams faced off to determine their placing in the 2022 Billie Jean King Cup Americas Zone Group II. The top two teams advanced to Billie Jean King Cup Americas Zone Group I.

Placing	Pool A	Pool B	Pool C	Pool D
1	Dominican Republic	Peru	Bolivia	Uruguay
2	Bahamas	Venezuela	Puerto Rico	Honduras
3	El Salvador	Cuba	Aruba	Costa Rica
4	Bermuda	U.S. Virgin Islands	Panama	Bahamas
5	—N/a			Barbados

== Promotional play-offs ==
The first placed teams of each pool were drawn in head-to-head round. The winners advanced to Group I in 2023.

=== Dominican Republic vs. Bolivia ===
Dominican Republic
0
Centro Nacional de Tenis Parque del Este, Santo Domingo Este, Dominican Republic
30 July 2022
Hard

Bolivia
2

			1	2	3
1	(Dominican Republic) (Bolivia)	Ana Carmen Zamburek; María Olivia Castedo	4; 6	6; 3	1; 6
2	(Dominican Republic) (Bolivia)	Kelly Williford; Noelia Zeballos	3; 6	0; 6
3	(Dominican Republic) (Bolivia)	Kelly Williford / Ana Carmen Zamburek; María Olivia Castedo / Noelia Zeballos				not played

=== Peru vs. Uruguay ===
Peru
2
Centro Nacional de Tenis Parque del Este, Santo Domingo Este, Dominican Republic
30 July 2022
Hard

Uruguay
1

			1	2	3
1	(Peru) (Uruguay)	Anastasia Iamachkine; Agustina Cuestas	6; 0	6; 2
2	(Peru) (Uruguay)	Romina Ccuno; Guillermina Grant	3; 6	3; 6
3	(Peru) (Uruguay)	Anastasia Iamachkine / Camila Soares; Agustina Cuestas / Guillermina Grant	6; 2	6; 3

== 5th to 8th play-offs ==
The second placed teams of each pool were drawn in head-to-head rounds to find the 5th placed teams.

=== Bahamas vs. Puerto Rico ===
Bahamas
1
Centro Nacional de Tenis Parque del Este, Santo Domingo Este, Dominican Republic
30 July 2022
Hard

Puerto Rico
2

			1	2	3
1	(The Bahamas) (Puerto Rico)	Elana Mackey; Julieanne Bou	7^{7} 6^{4}	6; 4
2	(The Bahamas) (Puerto Rico)	Sydney Clarke; Sara Isabel Snyder	2; 6	7^{7} 6^{1}	3; 6
3	(The Bahamas) (Puerto Rico)	Sydney Clarke / Elana Mackey; Daniella O'Neill García / Sara Isabel Snyder	4; 6	4; 6

=== Venezuela vs. Honduras ===
Venezuela
2
Centro Nacional de Tenis Parque del Este, Santo Domingo Este, Dominican Republic
30 July 2022
Hard

Honduras
0

			1	2	3
1	(Venezuela) (Honduras)	Vanesa Suárez; Alejandra Obando	7; 5	6; 0
2	(Venezuela) (Honduras)	Nadia Echeverría Alam; Natalie Gabriela Espinal Sánchez	6; 1	6; 2
3	(Venezuela) (Honduras)	Isabella Colmenares / Daniela Rivera; Natalie Gabriela Espinal Sánchez / Daniela Obando				not played

== 9th to 12th play-offs ==
The third placed teams of each pool were drawn in head-to-head rounds to find the 9th placed teams.

=== El Salvador vs. Aruba ===
El Salvador
2
Centro Nacional de Tenis Parque del Este, Santo Domingo Este, Dominican Republic
30 July 2022
Hard

Aruba
0

			1	2	3
1	(El Salvador) (Aruba)	Daniela Aguilar; Danna Nunez	6; 2	6; 2
2	(El Salvador) (Aruba)	Michelle Irigoyen; Jelsyvette Kaylyn Croes	6; 2	6; 3
3	(El Salvador) (Aruba)	Daniela Aguilar / Michelle Irigoyen; Jelsyvette Kaylyn Croes / Kayla Solagnier				not played

=== Costa Rica vs. Cuba ===
Costa Rica
2
Centro Nacional de Tenis Parque del Este, Santo Domingo Este, Dominican Republic
30 July 2022
Hard

Cuba
1

			1	2	3
1	(Costa Rica) (Cuba)	Nicole Alfaro; Roxana Valdez	7; 5	6^{6} 7^{8}	6; 3
2	(Costa Rica) (Cuba)	Eugenia Camacho; Sachely Carrera	3; 6	7; 5	1; 6
3	(Costa Rica) (Cuba)	Nicole Alfaro / Ariana Rahmanparast; Sachely Carrera / Roxana Valdez	4; 6	6; 1	6; 3

== 13th to 16th play-offs ==
The fourth placed teams of each pool were drawn in head-to-head rounds to find the 13th placed teams.

=== Bermuda vs. Panama ===
Bermuda
0
Centro Nacional de Tenis Parque del Este, Santo Domingo Este, Dominican Republic
30 July 2022
Hard

Panama
2

			1	2	3
1	(Bermuda) (Panama)	Asia-Leigh Hollis; Anna Louise Bjørnestad	2; 6	1; 6
2	(Bermuda) (Panama)	Shelby Madeiros; Rosaline Zafir Chávez Tello	2; 6	0; 6
3	(Bermuda) (Panama)	Asia-Leigh Hollis / Shelby Madeiros; Anna Louise Bjørnestad / Rosaline Zafir Chávez Tello				not played

=== Jamaica vs. U.S. Virgin Islands ===
Jamaica
2
Centro Nacional de Tenis Parque del Este, Santo Domingo Este, Dominican Republic
30 July 2022
Hard

U.S. Virgin Islands
1

			1	2	3
1	(Jamaica) (United States Virgin Islands)	Katherine Dibbs; Malena del Olmo	6; 4	4; 6	1; 6
2	(Jamaica) (United States Virgin Islands)	Junmoke James; Lisa Messier	6; 2	6; 0
3	(Jamaica) (United States Virgin Islands)	Katherine Dibbs / Junmoke James; Malena del Olmo / Lisa Messier	6; 3	6; 4

== Final placements ==
Placing	Teams	
Promoted/First	Bolivia	Peru
Third	Dominican Republic	Uruguay
Fifth	Puerto Rico	Venezuela
Seventh	Bahamas	Honduras
Ninth	El Salvador	Costa Rica
Eleventh	Aruba	Cuba
Thirteenth	Panama	Jamaica
Fifteenth	Bermuda	U.S. Virgin Islands
Seventeenth	Barbados	

- Bolivia and Peru were promoted to Americas Zone Group I in 2023.
