= 2018 Fed Cup Americas Zone Group II – play-offs =

Subsection of tennis competition

The play-offs of the 2018 Fed Cup Americas Zone Group II were the final stages of the Group II Zonal Competition involving teams from the Americas. Using the positions determined in their pools, the thirteen teams faced off to determine their placing in the 2018 Fed Cup Americas Zone Group II. The top two teams advanced to Group I in 2019.

== Pool results ==
Placing	Pool A (Metepec)	Pool B (Metepec)	Pool A (Guayaquil)	Pool B (Guayaquil)
1	Mexico	Peru	Ecuador	Bahamas
2	Dominican Republic	Cuba	Costa Rica	Bolivia
3	Barbados	Uruguay	Honduras	Trinidad and Tobago
4	—			Bermuda

== Promotional play-offs ==
The first placed teams of the four pools were drawn in head-to-head rounds. The winners advanced to Group I.

=== Mexico vs. Peru ===
Mexico
2
Club Deportivo La Asunción, Metepec, Mexico
23 June
Hard

Peru
0

			1	2	3
1	(Mexico) (Peru)	Fernanda Contreras Gómez; Dana Guzmán	6; 0	7; 5
2	(Mexico) (Peru)	Marcela Zacarías; Anastasia Iamachkine	7; 5	6; 1
3	(Mexico) (Peru)	Fernanda Contreras Gómez / María José Portillo Ramírez; Anastasia Iamachkine / Camila Soares				not played

=== Ecuador vs. Bahamas ===
Ecuador
2
Centro Nacional de Tenis de la FET, Guayaquil, Ecuador
21 July
Clay

Bahamas
0

			1	2	3
1	(Ecuador) (The Bahamas)	Camila Romero; Danielle Andrea Thompson	6; 3	6; 3
2	(Ecuador) (The Bahamas)	Charlotte Römer; Kerrie Cartwright	6; 3	6; 3
3	(Ecuador) (The Bahamas)	Domenica González / Charlotte Römer; Kerrie Cartwright / Danielle Andrea Thompson				not played

== Third to fourth place play-offs ==
The second placed teams of the four pools were drawn in head-to-head rounds to determine the 3rd to 4th placings.

=== Dominican Republic vs. Cuba ===
Dominican Republic
0
Club Deportivo La Asunción, Metepec, Mexico
23 June
Hard

Cuba
2

			1	2	3
1	(Dominican Republic) (Cuba)	Laura Lisette Quezada Martínez; Isid Hernández	6; 2	5; 7	4; 6
2	(Dominican Republic) (Cuba)	Kelly Williford; Yusleydis Smith Dias	3; 6	5; 7
3	(Dominican Republic) (Cuba)	Karla Portalatin / Francesca Segarelli; Yamile Fors Guerra / Yusleydis Smith Dias				not played

=== Costa Rica vs. Bolivia ===
Costa Rica
2
Centro Nacional de Tenis de la FET, Guayaquil, Ecuador
21 July
Clay

Bolivia
1

			1	2	3
1	(Costa Rica) (Bolivia)	Sofía Pérez; Daniela Alejandra la Fuente Strassburger	6; 4	6; 4
2	(Costa Rica) (Bolivia)	Ariana Rahmanparast; Noelia Zeballos	5; 7	2; 6
3	(Costa Rica) (Bolivia)	Sofía Pérez / Ariana Rahmanparast; Daniela Alejandra la Fuente Strassburger / Noelia Zeballos	6; 0	7; 5

== Fifth to sixth place play-offs ==
The third placed teams of the four pools were drawn in head-to-head rounds to determine the 5th to 6th placings.

=== Uruguay vs. Barbados ===
Uruguay
3
Club Deportivo La Asunción, Metepec, Mexico
23 June
Hard

Barbados
0

			1	2	3
1	(Uruguay) (Barbados)	Fernanda Secinaro; Gabrielle Leslie	6; 2	6; 0
2	(Uruguay) (Barbados)	Florencia Rossi; Hannah Chambers	6; 3	6; 0
3	(Uruguay) (Barbados)	Fernanda Secinaro / Isabella Tiscornia; Hannah Chambers / Tangia Riley-Codrington	6; 4	7^{7} 6^{5}

=== Honduras vs. Triniad and Tobago ===
Honduras
2
Centro Nacional de Tenis de la FET, Guayaquil, Ecuador
21 July
Clay

Trinidad and Tobago
1

			1	2	3
1	(Honduras) (Trinidad and Tobago)	Daniela Obando; Carlista Mohammed	6; 1	6; 1
2	(Honduras) (Trinidad and Tobago)	Natalie Gabriela Espinal Sánchez; Breana Stampfli	1; 6	2; 6
3	(Honduras) (Trinidad and Tobago)	Daniela Obando / Ana Gabriela Zavala Mata; Carlista Mohammed / Breana Stampfli	6; 2	6; 3

== Final placements ==
Placing	Teams	
Promoted	Mexico	Ecuador
Second	Peru	Bahamas
Third	Cuba	Costa Rica
Fourth	Dominican Republic	Bolivia
Fifth	Uruguay	Honduras
Sixth	Barbados	Trinidad and Tobago
Seventh	Bermuda	

- Mexico and Ecuador advanced to Americas Zone Group I in 2019.

== See also ==
- Fed Cup structure
