= Anastasia Iamachkine =

Peruvian tennis player (born 2000)

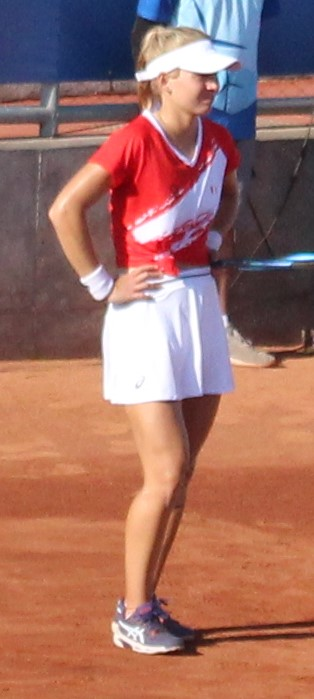
- Iamachkine at the 2023 Pan American Games
- Country (sports): Peru
- Born: 12 September 2000 (age 26) Lima, Peru
- Retired: 2026
- Plays: Right (two-handed backhand)
- Prize money: $25,755

Singles
- Career record: 75–66
- Highest ranking: No. 713 (31 July 2023)

Doubles
- Career record: 45–26
- Highest ranking: No. 439 (28 August 2023)
Medal record
Representing Peru
Pan American Games
Bronze medal – third place	2019 Lima	Mixed doubles
- Last updated on: 7 September 2026.

Anastasia Iamachkine (born 12 September 2000) is a former Peruvian tennis player.

She has a career-high doubles ranking by the WTA of No. 439, achieved on 28 August 2023.

She studied at Pepperdine University in Malibu and competed for the Pepperdine Waves team.

Born in Lima, Iamachkine began playing tennis at the age of five. Of Russian descent, she attended the Russian Embassy School between 2005 and 2016 and is fluent in both Spanish and Russian.

The player who inspires her in tennis is Maria Sharapova. She won a bronze medal in mixed doubles at the 2019 Pan American Games. In November 2017 she won a silver medal in the women's doubles at the Bolivarian Games. Iamachkine announced her retirement in July 2026.

== ITF Circuit finals ==
=== Singles: 1 (runner–up) ===
Legend W15 tournaments (0–1)	Finals by surface Clay (0–1)

Result	W–L	Date	Tournament	Tier	Surface	Opponent	Score
Loss	0–1	Jun 2023	ITF Kočevje, Slovenia	W15	Clay	Anna Zyryanova	1–6, 4–6

=== Doubles: 12 (4 titles, 8 runner–ups) ===
Legend W40 tournaments (0–1) W25/35 tournaments (0–2) W15 tournaments (4–5)	Finals by surface Hard (0–4) Clay (3–4) Carpet (1–0)

Result	W–L	Date	Tournament	Tier	Surface	Partner	Opponents	Score
Loss	0–1	Oct 2017	ITF Telde, Spain	W15	Clay	(Spain) Ana Lantigua de la Nuez	(Netherlands) Chayenne Ewijk (Switzerland) Lisa Sabino	1–6, 1–6
Loss	0–2	Jan 2020	ITF Malibu, United States	W25	Hard	(Norway) Astrid Wanja Brune Olsen	(Brazil) Laura Pigossi (Netherlands) Rosalie van der Hoek	4–6, 6–7^{(4)}
Loss	0–3	Sep 2022	ITF Monastir, Tunisia	W15	Hard	(United States) Teja Tirunelveli	(Japan) Honoka Kobayashi (India) Jennifer Luikham	3–6, 6–0, [5–10]
Win	1–3	Nov 2022	ITF Lima, Peru	W15	Clay	(Peru) Lucciana Pérez Alarcón	(Peru) Romina Ccuno (Colombia) María Camila Torres Murcia	6–2, 6–4
Loss	1–4	Nov 2022	ITF Lima, Peru	W15	Clay	(Peru) Leslie Espinoza Gamarra	(Peru) Romina Ccuno (Colombia) María Herazo González	1–6, 3–6
Win	2–4	Nov 2022	ITF Mar del Plata, Argentina	W15	Clay	(Brazil) Ana Candiotto	(Argentina) Luciana Blatter (Argentina) Josefina Estévez	6–3, 6–3
Win	3–4	Dec 2022	ITF Buenos Aires, Argentina	W15	Clay	(Chile) Fernanda Astete	(Mexico) Marian Gomez Pezuela Cano (Argentina) Maria Victoria Marchesini	7-5, 6-4
Loss	3–5	Jun 2023	ITF Kursumlijska Banja, Serbia	W15	Clay	(Brazil) Ana Candiotto	(Greece) Eleni Christofi (Serbia) Natalija Senić	6–7^{(5)}, 3–6
Win	4–5	Jul 2023	ITF Don Benito, Spain	W25	Carpet	(Colombia) María Herazo González	(Spain) Lucía Cortez Llorca (Spain) Olga Parres Azcoitia	7–6^{(8)}, 6–3
Loss	4–6	Aug 2023	ITF Arequipa, Peru	W40	Clay	(Brazil) Ana Candiotto	(Germany) Natalia Siedliska (Bolivia) Noelia Zeballos	7–5, 2–6, [8–10]
Loss	4–7	Apr 2024	ITF Yecla, Spain	W35	Hard	(United States) Jessica Failla	(Hungary) Adrienn Nagy (Germany) Joëlle Steur	3–6, 4–6
Loss	4–8	Jun 2024	ITF Madrid, Spain	W15	Hard	(Brazil) Ana Candiotto	(United Kingdom) Holly Hutchinson (United Kingdom) Ella McDonald	4–6, 1–6

== Fed Cup/Billie Jean King Cup results ==
=== Singles (10–8) ===
Matches by surface
Hard (6–1)
Clay (4–7)

Result	W–L	Date	Tournament	Surface	Opponent	Score
Loss	0–1	2016	Americas Zone Group I Santa Cruz, Bolivia	Clay	(Brazil) Beatriz Haddad Maia	1–6, 6–7^{(2–7)}
Loss	0–2	2016	Americas Zone Group I Santa Cruz, Bolivia	Clay	(Argentina) Nadia Podoroska	2–6, 1–6
Loss	0–3	2016	Americas Zone Group I Santa Cruz, Bolivia	Clay	(Ecuador) Rafaella Baquerizo	3–6, 1–6
Loss	0–4	2016	Americas Zone Group I Play-offs Santa Cruz, Bolivia	Clay	(Bolivia) Noelia Zeballos	6–4, 5–7, 1–6
Win	1–4	2017	Americas Zone Group II Panama City, Panama	Clay	(Costa Rica) Ariana Rahmanparast	6–0, 1–6, 6–4
Win	2–4	2018	Americas Zone Group II Metepec, Mexico	Hard	(Uruguay) Isabella Tiscornia	6–1, 6–2
Win	3–4	2018	Americas Zone Group II Metepec, Mexico	Hard	(Cuba) Yusleydis Smith Dias	6–3, 6–2
Loss	3–5	2018	Americas Zone Group II Play-offs Metepec, Mexico	Hard	(Mexico) Marcela Zacarías	5–7, 1–6
Win	4–5	2019	Americas Zone Group II Lima, Peru	Clay	(Panama) Zulay Castañeda	6–2, 6–0
Win	5–5	2019	Americas Zone Group II Lima, Peru	Clay	(Bolivia) María Fernanda Álvarez Terán	4–6, 6–1, 6–1
Win	6–5	2019	Americas Zone Group II Play-off Lima, Peru	Clay	(The Bahamas) Danielle Andrea Thompson	6–2, 6–1
Win	7–5	2022	Americas Zone Group II Santo Domingo, Dominican Republic	Hard	(Cuba) Roxana Valdez	6–1, 6–2
Win	8–5	2022	Americas Zone Group II Santo Domingo, Dominican Republic	Hard	(United States Virgin Islands) Natasha Messier	6–0, 6–1
Win	9–5	2022	Americas Zone Group II Santo Domingo, Dominican Republic	Hard	(Venezuela) Vanesa Suárez	5–7, 7–6^{(0)}, 6–2
Win	10–5	2022	Americas Zone Group II play-offs Santo Domingo, Dominican Republic	Hard	(Uruguay) Agustina Cuestas	6–0, 6–2
Loss	10–6	2023	Americas Zone I Cúcuta, Colombia	Clay	(Colombia) Emiliana Arango	4–6, 2–6
Loss	10–7	2023	Americas Zone I Cúcuta, Colombia	Clay	(Bolivia) Noelia Zeballos	2–6, 4–6
Loss	10–8	2023	Americas Zone I Cúcuta, Colombia	Clay	(Guatemala) Gabriela Rivera	6–6, 2–6, 6–7^{(5)}

=== Doubles (8–5) ===
Matches by surface
Hard (2–0)
Clay (6–5)

Result	W–L	Date	Tournament	Surface	Partner	Opponents	Score
Loss	0–1	2016	Americas Zone Group I Santa Cruz, Bolivia	Clay	(Peru) Dominique Schaefer	(Brazil) Paula Cristina Gonçalves (Brazil) Beatriz Haddad Maia	1–6, 1–6
Loss	0–2	2016	Americas Zone Group I Santa Cruz, Bolivia	Clay	(Peru) Bianca Botto	(Ecuador) Rafaella Baquerizo (Ecuador) Camila Romero	4–6, 0–6
Win	1–2	2017	Americas Zone Group II Panama City, Panama	Clay	(Peru) Bianca Botto	(Panama) Aranza Lailu Benítez Ellis (Panama) Daniela Díez	6–0, 6–0
Win	2–2	2017	Americas Zone Group II Panama City, Panama	Clay	(Peru) Bianca Botto	(The Bahamas) Sierra Donaldson (The Bahamas) Elana Mackey	6–0, 6–0
Loss	2–3	2017	Americas Zone Group II – play-offs, Panama City, Panama	Clay	(Peru) Bianca Botto	(Guatemala) Melissa Morales (Guatemala) Daniela Schippers	2–6, 5–7
Win	3–3	2019	Americas Zone Group II Lima, Peru	Clay	(Peru) Camila Soares	(Panama) Zulay Castañeda (Panama) Yeniseik Gómez	6–2, 6–0
Win	4–3	2019	Americas Zone Group II Lima, Peru	Clay	(Peru) Camila Soares	(Bolivia) María Fernanda Álvarez Terán (Bolivia) Noelia Zeballos	6–3, 7–5
Win	5–3	2022	Americas Zone Group II Santo Domingo, Dominican Republic	Hard	(Peru) Camila Soares	(Cuba) Sachely Carrera (Cuba) Roxana Valdez	6–3, 6–3
Win	6–3	2022	Americas Zone Group II play-offs Santo Domingo, Dominican Republic	Hard	(Peru) Camila Soares	(Uruguay) Agustina Cuestas (Uruguay) Guillermina Grant	6–2, 6–3
Loss	6–4	2023	Americas Zone Group I Cúcuta, Colombia	Clay	(Peru) Romina Ccuno	(Chile) Alexa Guarachi (Chile) Daniela Seguel	1–6, 3–6
Win	7–4	2023	Americas Zone Group I Cúcuta, Colombia	Clay	(Peru) Lucciana Pérez	(Bolivia) Natalia Trigosso (Bolivia) Noelia Zeballos	6–4, 6–4
Loss	7–5	2023	Americas Zone Group I Cúcuta, Colombia	Clay	(Peru) Lucciana Pérez	(Argentina) Guillermina Naya (Argentina) Julia Riera	4–6, 4–6
Win	8–5	2023	Americas Zone Group I Cúcuta, Colombia	Clay	(Peru) Lucciana Pérez	(Guatemala) Melissa Morales (Guatemala) Gabriela Rivera	6–0, 6–1

== National representation ==
=== Womens Doubles: 1 (1 Silver Medal) ===
Result	Date	Tournament	Partner	Opponents	Score
Silver	November 2017	2017 Bolivarian Games, Santa Marta, Colombia	(Peru) Dominique Schaefer	(Chile) Daniela Seguel (Chile) Alexa Guarachi	3–6, 2–6

=== Mixed Doubles: 1 (1 Bronze Medal) ===
Result	Date	Tournament	Partner	Opponents	Score
Bronze	August 2019	2019 Pan American Games, Lima, Peru	(Peru) Sergio Galdós	(Guatemala) Kirsten-Andrea Weedon (Guatemala) Wilfredo González	7–5, 6–1
