= 2023 Billie Jean King Cup Americas Zone =

Subsection of tennis competition

The Americas Zone is one of three zones of regional competition in the 2023 Billie Jean King Cup.

== Group I ==
- Date: 11–15 April 2023
- Venue: Tennis Golf Club, Cúcuta, Colombia (clay, outdoors)

The two nations finishing 1st and 2nd in the pool advanced to the 2023 Billie Jean King Cup play-offs. The nations finishing fifth and last were relegated to Group II for 2024.

=== Seeding ===
Nation	Rank^{1}	Seed
Argentina	24	1
Colombia	31	2
Chile	33	3
Peru	35	4
Bolivia	37	5
Guatemala	49	6

- ^{1}Billie Jean King Cup Rankings as of 16 November 2022

=== Pools ===
	Pool A	ARG	COL	CHI	PER	GUA	BOL
1	Argentina (5–0)		3–0	3–0	2–1	3–0	3–0
2	Colombia (4–1)	0–3		3–0	2–1	3–0	3–0
3	Chile (3–2)	0–3	0–3		2–1	3–0	2–0
4	Peru (2–3)	1–2	1–2	1–2		2–1	2–1
5	Guatemala (1–4)	0–3	0–3	0–3	1–2		2–1
6	Bolivia (0–5)	0–3	0–3	0–2	1–2	1–2	

=== Final placements ===
Placing	Teams
Promoted/First	Argentina
Promoted/Second	Colombia
Third	Chile
Fourth	Peru
Relegated/Fifth	Guatemala
Relegated/Sixth	Bolivia

- Argentina and Colombia were promoted to the 2023 Billie Jean King Cup play-offs.
- Guatemala and Bolivia were relegated to Americas Zone Group II in 2024.

== Group II ==
- Date: 26–29 July 2023
- Venue: Centro Nacional De Tenis Parque Del Este, Santo Domingo Este, Dominican Republic (hard, outdoors)

Eight teams will take part in this Group. Two nations will be promoted to Group I in 2024, and two will be relegated to Group III.

=== Seeding ===
Nation	Rank^{1}	Seed
Uruguay	59	1
Paraguay	60	2
Venezuela	62	3
Dominican Republic	63	4
Bahamas	64	5
Ecuador	65	6
Honduras	72	7
Costa Rica	78	8

- ^{1}Billie Jean King Cup Rankings as of 17 April 2023

== Group III ==
- Date: 18–22 July 2023
- Venue: Federación Panameña de Tenis, Panama City, Panama (clay, outdoors)

Eleven teams will take part in this Group. Two nations will be promoted to Group II in 2024.

Nation	Rank^{1}	Seed
Puerto Rico	68	1
El Salvador	76=	2
Panama	79	3
Cuba	87	4
Jamaica	89	5
Barbados	96	6
Aruba	97	7
Bermuda	102=	8
U.S. Virgin Islands	102=	9
Antigua and Barbuda	NR	10
