= 2022 Billie Jean King Cup Americas Zone Group I – Pool A =

Subsection of tennis competition

Pool A of the 2022 Billie Jean King Cup Americas Zone Group I was one of two pools in the Americas zone of the 2020–21 Billie Jean King Cup. Four teams competed in a round robin competition, with the top teams and the bottom teams proceeding to their respective sections of the play-offs: the top teams played for advancement to 2022 Billie Jean King Cup Play-offs.

== Standings ==
		BRA	ARG	COL	GUA	RR; W–L	Set; W–L	Game; W–L	Standings
1	Brazil		2–1	3–0	3–0	8–1	17–4 (81%)	126–71 (64%)	1
3	Argentina	1–2		3–0	3–0	7–2	16–7 (70%)	124–101 (55%)	2
6	Colombia	0–3	0–3		3–0	3–6	7–12 (37%)	84–98 (46%)	3
7	Guatemala	0–3	0–3	0–3		0–9	1–18 (5%)	50–114 (30%)	4

Standings are determined by: 1. number of wins; 2. number of matches; 3. in two-team ties, head-to-head records; 4. in three-team ties, (a) percentage of matches won (head-to-head records if two teams remain tied), then (b) percentage of sets won (head-to-head records if two teams remain tied), then (c) percentage of games won (head-to-head records if two teams remain tied), then (d) Billie Jean King Cup rankings.

== Round-robin ==
=== Brazil vs. Guatemala ===
Brazil
3
Salinas Golf and Tennis Club, Salinas, Ecuador
13 April 2022
Hard

Guatemala
0

			1	2	3
1	(Brazil) (Guatemala)	Carolina Alves; Melissa Morales	6; 0	6; 2
2	(Brazil) (Guatemala)	Beatriz Haddad Maia; Kirsten-Andrea Weedon	6; 0	6; 0
3	(Brazil) (Guatemala)	Beatriz Haddad Maia / Laura Pigossi; Gabriela Rivera / Kirsten-Andrea Weedon	6; 3	6; 1

=== Argentina vs. Colombia ===
Argentina
3
Salinas Golf and Tennis Club, Salinas, Ecuador
13 April 2022
Hard

Colombia
0

			1	2	3
1	(Argentina) (Colombia)	Solana Sierra; Yuliana Lizarazo	6; 2	6; 3
2	(Argentina) (Colombia)	María Lourdes Carlé; María Herazo González	3; 6	7; 5	6; 2
3	(Argentina) (Colombia)	Jazmín Ortenzi / Julia Riera; Yuliana Lizarazo / María Paulina Pérez	6; 4	6; 3

=== Brazil vs. Argentina ===
Brazil
2
Salinas Golf and Tennis Club, Salinas, Ecuador
14 April 2022
Hard

Argentina
1

			1	2	3
1	(Brazil) (Argentina)	Laura Pigossi; Solana Sierra	6^{1} 7^{7}	6; 4	6^{12} 7^{14}
2	(Brazil) (Argentina)	Beatriz Haddad Maia; María Lourdes Carlé	6^{10} 7^{12}	6; 3	7^{7} 6^{5}
3	(Brazil) (Argentina)	Carolina Alves / Beatriz Haddad Maia; Jazmín Ortenzi / Julia Riera	6; 3	3; 6	6; 1

=== Colombia vs. Guatemala ===
Colombia
3
Salinas Golf and Tennis Club, Salinas, Ecuador
14 April 2022
Hard

Guatemala
0

			1	2	3
1	(Colombia) (Guatemala)	Yuliana Lizarazo; Gabriela Rivera	6; 3	7; 5
2	(Colombia) (Guatemala)	María Herazo González; Kirsten-Andrea Weedon	7^{9} 6^{7}	6; 4
3	(Colombia) (Guatemala)	María Herazo González / María Paulina Pérez; Melissa Morales / Gabriela Rivera	6; 1	6; 1

=== Brazil vs. Colombia ===
Brazil
3
Salinas Golf and Tennis Club, Salinas, Ecuador
15 April 2022
Hard

Colombia
0

			1	2	3
1	(Brazil) (Colombia)	Carolina Alves; Yuliana Lizarazo	7; 5	7; 5
2	(Brazil) (Colombia)	Laura Pigossi; María Herazo González	6; 0	6; 4
3	(Brazil) (Colombia)	Gabriela Cé / Rebeca Pereira; María Paulina Pérez / Antonia Samudio	6; 4	6; 3

=== Argentina vs. Guatemala ===
Argentina
3
Salinas Golf and Tennis Club, Salinas, Ecuador
15 April 2022
Hard

Guatemala
0

			1	2	3
1	(Argentina) (Guatemala)	Solana Sierra; Melissa Morales	6; 4	6; 0
2	(Argentina) (Guatemala)	Jazmín Ortenzi; Kirsten-Andrea Weedon	3; 6	6; 3	6; 3
3	(Argentina) (Guatemala)	Jazmín Ortenzi / Julia Riera; Gabriela Rivera / Kirsten-Andrea Weedon	7; 5	6; 3
