= 2019 Fed Cup Americas Zone Group II – play-offs =

Subsection of tennis competition

The play-offs of the 2019 Fed Cup Americas Zone Group II were the final stages of the Group II Zonal Competition involving teams from the Americas. Using the positions determined in their pools, the six teams in Lima faced off to determine their placing in the 2019 Fed Cup Americas Zone Group II. The winning team advanced to Group I in 2020, alongside the winning team from Pool A in Santo Domingo.

== Pool results ==
Placing	Pool A (Lima)	Pool B (Lima)	Pool A (Santo Domingo)
1	Peru	Bahamas	Venezuela
2	Bolivia	Trinidad and Tobago	Guatemala
3	Panama	Barbados	Uruguay
4	—		Dominican Republic
5	—		Cuba

== Promotional play-offs ==
The first placed teams of the two pools in Lima were drawn in head-to-head rounds. The winners advanced to Group I, alongside the winning team from Pool A in Santo Domingo.

=== Peru vs. Bahamas ===
Peru
2
Tennis Club Las Terrazas Miraflores, Lima, Peru
20 April 2019
Clay

Bahamas
0

			1	2	3
1	(Peru) (The Bahamas)	Anastasia Iamachkine; Danielle Andrea Thompson	6; 2	6; 1
2	(Peru) (The Bahamas)	Dana Guzmán; Kerrie Cartwright	6; 4	6; 2
3	(Peru) (The Bahamas)	Anastasia Iamachkine / Camila Soares; Kerrie Cartwright / Danielle Andrea Thompson				not played

== Third to fourth place play-offs ==
The second placed teams of the two pools in Lima were drawn in head-to-head rounds to determine the 3rd to 4th placings.

=== Bolivia vs. Trinidad and Tobago ===
Bolivia
2
Tennis Club Las Terrazas Miraflores, Lima, Peru
20 April 2019
Clay

Trinidad and Tobago
0

			1	2	3
1	(Bolivia) (Trinidad and Tobago)	Gabriela Cortés Flores; Anneliese Rose	6; 2	6; 3
2	(Bolivia) (Trinidad and Tobago)	Noelia Zeballos; Anya King	6; 0	6; 0
3	(Bolivia) (Trinidad and Tobago)	Gabriela Cortés Flores / Paola Cortez Vargas; Anya King / Anneliese Rose				not played

== Fifth to sixth place play-offs ==
The third placed teams of the two pools in Lima were drawn in head-to-head rounds to determine the 5th to 6th placings.

=== Barbados vs. Panama ===
Barbados
0
Tennis Club Las Terrazas Miraflores, Lima, Peru
20 April 2019
Clay

Panama
3

			1	2	3
1	(Barbados) (Panama)	Chloe Weekes; Zulay Castañeda	0; 6	1; 6
2	(Barbados) (Panama)	Tangia Riley-Codrington; Karen Esther Contreras	3; 6	1; 6
3	(Barbados) (Panama)	Melena Lopez / Chloe Weekes; Zulay Castañeda / Yeniseik Gómez	5; 7	0; 5		retired

== Final placements ==
Placing	Teams	
Promoted/First	Peru	Venezuela
Second	Bahamas	Guatemala
Third	Bolivia	Uruguay
Fourth	Trinidad and Tobago	Dominican Republic
Fifth	Panama	Cuba
Sixth	Barbados	

- Peru and Venezuela were promoted to Americas Zone Group I in 2020.

== See also ==
- Fed Cup structure
