= Ensanche Isabelita =

- Location within the Dominican Republic
- Coordinates: 18°28′N 69°51′W
- Country: Dominican Republic
- Province: Santo Domingo
- Municipalities: Santo Domingo Este

Government
  - Mayor: Dío Astacio

Population (2009)
  - Total: 79,543
- Time zone: UTC-4 (AST)
- Area code: 1-809 1-829 1-849
- ISO 3166-2: DO-01
- Postal Code: 11501 to 11906

Ensanche Isabelita is a sector or neighborhood in the city of Santo Domingo Este in the province of Santo Domingo of the Dominican Republic. This neighborhood is populated in particular by individuals from the middle classes.
