= Los Mameyes =

- Location within the Dominican Republic
- Coordinates: 18°28′N 69°51′W
- Country: Dominican Republic
- Province: Santo Domingo
- Municipalities: Santo Domingo Este

Government
  - Mayor: Dío Astacio

Population (2008)
  - Total: 98,548
- Time zone: UTC-4 (AST)
- Area code: 1-809 1-829 1-849
- ISO 3166-2: DO-01
- Postal code: 11501–11906

Los Mameyes is a neighbourhood in the city of Santo Domingo Este in the province of Santo Domingo of the Dominican Republic. This neighbourhood is populated in particular by individuals from the middle classes.

== History ==
The name Los Mameyes came about because of a mango plantation called mameyitos.

It is located in the south coastal park where one of the most important maritime entrances for tourism is the Sans Souci Tourist Port. The geographical area of this sector is from the 27 de Febrero Naval Base to Las Americas Avenue, it also goes around the Columbus Lighthouse Monument as well as the Mirador del Este Park.

Before being urbanized, only a mango plantation and cattle farms were observed, the cattle farms were jealously guarded by two military men on horseback, called Guardia Viejo and Kiclan, there were only two houses at long distances, one was inhabited by a man named Dionico and the other by another man named Bartola, both were a kind of supervisors and mayors.

The first housing occupation dates back to the first third of the 20th century, inhabited by the dictator Rafael Leónidas Trujillo Molina, who ordered the construction of Los Mameyes neighborhood, the military men who lived in those houses, only had the right to them, while they were enlisted, that is to say, After the death of Rafael Leónidas Trujillo Molina, Joaquín Balaguer came to power and decided to donate the houses to the soldiers who occupied them at the time.

There was also the Embassy of Israel, which later became the summer home of the presidents, which today is known as the "National Aquarium".

== Notable people ==
=== Actors, artists, musicians, writers ===
- Veronica Medina – merengue singer
- Denicher Pol – gospel singer

=== Journalists ===
- Franklin Mirabal – sports commentator
- Luther Yonel – announcer

=== Athletes ===
- Gilberto Reyes – baseball player
- Carlos Santana – baseball player
- Amed Rosario – baseball player
- Rosell Herrera – baseball player
- Michael De León – baseball player
- Gelvis Solano – basketball player
- Lewis Duarte – basketball player
- Yenebier Guillén – boxer
- Heidy Rodríguez – karateka

=== Politicians ===
- Juan de los Santos – former mayor
- Elvin Fulgencio (Pilo) – former deputy
- Amado Díaz – deputy
