= 2022 Billie Jean King Cup Americas Zone Group II – Pool A =

Subsection of tennis competition

Pool A of the 2022 Billie Jean King Cup Americas Zone Group II was one of four pools in the Americas zone of the 2022 Billie Jean King Cup. Four teams competed in a round robin competition, with each team proceeding to their respective sections of the play-offs: the top team played for advancement to Group I in 2023.

== Standings ==
| | | DOM | BAH | ESA | BER | RR; W–L | Set; W–L | Game; W–L | Standings |
| 6 | Dominican Republic | | 3–0 | 3–0 | 3–0 | 9–0 | 18–0 (100%) | 110–25 (81%) | 1 |
| 1 | Bahamas | 0–3 | | 3–0 | 3–0 | 6–3 | 12–6 (67%) | 82–51 (62%) | 2 |
| 11 | El Salvador | 0–3 | 0–3 | | 3–0 | 3–6 | 6–12 (33%) | 57–85 (40%) | 3 |
| 15 | Bermuda | 0–3 | 0–3 | 0–3 | | 0–9 | 0–18 (0%) | 20–108 (16%) | 4 |

Standings are determined by: 1. number of wins; 2. number of matches; 3. in two-team ties, head-to-head records; 4. in three-team ties, (a) percentage of matches won (head-to-head records if two teams remain tied), then (b) percentage of sets won (head-to-head records if two teams remain tied), then (c) percentage of games won (head-to-head records if two teams remain tied), then (d) Billie Jean King Cup rankings.

== Round-robin ==
=== Bahamas vs. El Salvador ===
Bahamas
3
Centro Nacional de Tenis Parque del Este, Santo Domingo Este, Dominican Republic
25 July 2022
Hard

El Salvador
0

| | | | 1 | 2 | 3 |
|---|---|---|---|---|---|
| 1 | (The Bahamas) (El Salvador) | Elana Mackey; Daniela Aguilar | 6; 2 | 6; 0 |
| 2 | (The Bahamas) (El Salvador) | Sydney Clarke; Michelle Irigoyen | 6; 3 | 6; 1 |
| 3 | (The Bahamas) (El Salvador) | Sydney Clarke / Simone Pratt; Michelle Irigoyen / Raquel Alejandra Santos Marmol | 6; 0 | 6; 3 |

=== Dominican Republic vs. Bermuda ===
Dominican Republic
3
Centro Nacional de Tenis Parque del Este, Santo Domingo Este, Dominican Republic
25 July 2022
Hard

Bermuda
0

| | | | 1 | 2 | 3 |
|---|---|---|---|---|---|
| 1 | (Dominican Republic) (Bermuda) | Ana Carmen Zamburek; Asia-Leigh Hollis | 6; 1 | 6; 0 |
| 2 | (Dominican Republic) (Bermuda) | Kelly Williford; Shelby Madeiros | 6; 0 | 6; 2 |
| 3 | (Dominican Republic) (Bermuda) | Kelly Williford / Ana Carmen Zamburek; Nadhira Durham / Amaya Rollins | 6; 0 | 6; 0 |

=== Bahamas vs. Bermuda ===
Bahamas
3
Centro Nacional de Tenis Parque del Este, Santo Domingo Este, Dominican Republic
26 July 2022
Hard

Bermuda
0

| | | | 1 | 2 | 3 |
|---|---|---|---|---|---|
| 1 | (The Bahamas) (Bermuda) | Elana Mackey; Asia Leigh Hollis | 6; 1 | 6; 1 |
| 2 | (The Bahamas) (Bermuda) | Sydney Clarke; Shelby Madeiros | 6; 0 | 6; 2 |
| 3 | (The Bahamas) (Bermuda) | Sydney Clarke / Simone Pratt; Nadhira Durham / Kumaini Jackson | 6; 1 | 6; 0 |

=== Dominican Republic vs. El Salvador ===
Dominican Republic
3
Centro Nacional de Tenis Parque del Este, Santo Domingo Este, Dominican Republic
26 July 2022
Hard

El Salvador
0

| | | | 1 | 2 | 3 |
|---|---|---|---|---|---|
| 1 | (Dominican Republic) (El Salvador) | Carolina Isabel Chiatti Reynoso; Raquel Alejandra Santos Marmol | 6; 1 | 6; 2 |
| 2 | (Dominican Republic) (El Salvador) | Kelly Williford; Michelle Irigoyen | 6; 0 | 6; 2 |
| 3 | (Dominican Republic) (El Salvador) | Feidi Abreu / Carolina Isabel Chiatti Reynoso; Daniela Aguilar / Michelle Irigoyen | 6; 1 | 7^{7} 6^{5} |

=== Bahamas vs. Dominican Republic ===
Bahamas
0
Centro Nacional de Tenis Parque del Este, Santo Domingo Este, Dominican Republic
28 July 2022
Hard

Dominican Republic
3

| | | | 1 | 2 | 3 |
|---|---|---|---|---|---|
| 1 | (The Bahamas) (Dominican Republic) | Elana Mackey; Ana Carmen Zamburek | 1; 6 | 5; 7 |
| 2 | (The Bahamas) (Dominican Republic) | Sydney Clarke; Kelly Williford | 0; 6 | 2; 6 |
| 3 | (The Bahamas) (Dominican Republic) | Sydney Clarke / Sierra Rodgers; Carolina Isabel Chiatti Reynoso / Kelly Williford | 2; 6 | 0; 6 |

=== El Salvador vs. Bermuda ===
El Salvador
3
Centro Nacional de Tenis Parque del Este, Santo Domingo Este, Dominican Republic
28 July 2022
Hard

Bermuda
0

| | | | 1 | 2 | 3 |
|---|---|---|---|---|---|
| 1 | (El Salvador) (Bermuda) | Daniela Aguilar; Asia-Leigh Hollis | 6; 0 | 6; 3 |
| 2 | (El Salvador) (Bermuda) | Michelle Irigoyen; Shelby Madeiros | 6; 0 | 6; 4 |
| 3 | (El Salvador) (Bermuda) | Daniela Aguilar / Raquel Alejandra Santos Marmol; Kumaini Jackson / Amaya Rollins | 6; 1 | 6; 4 |
