= Los Tres Ojos National Park =

Open-air limestone cave in the Dominican Republic

Coordinates: 18.480°N 69.843°W

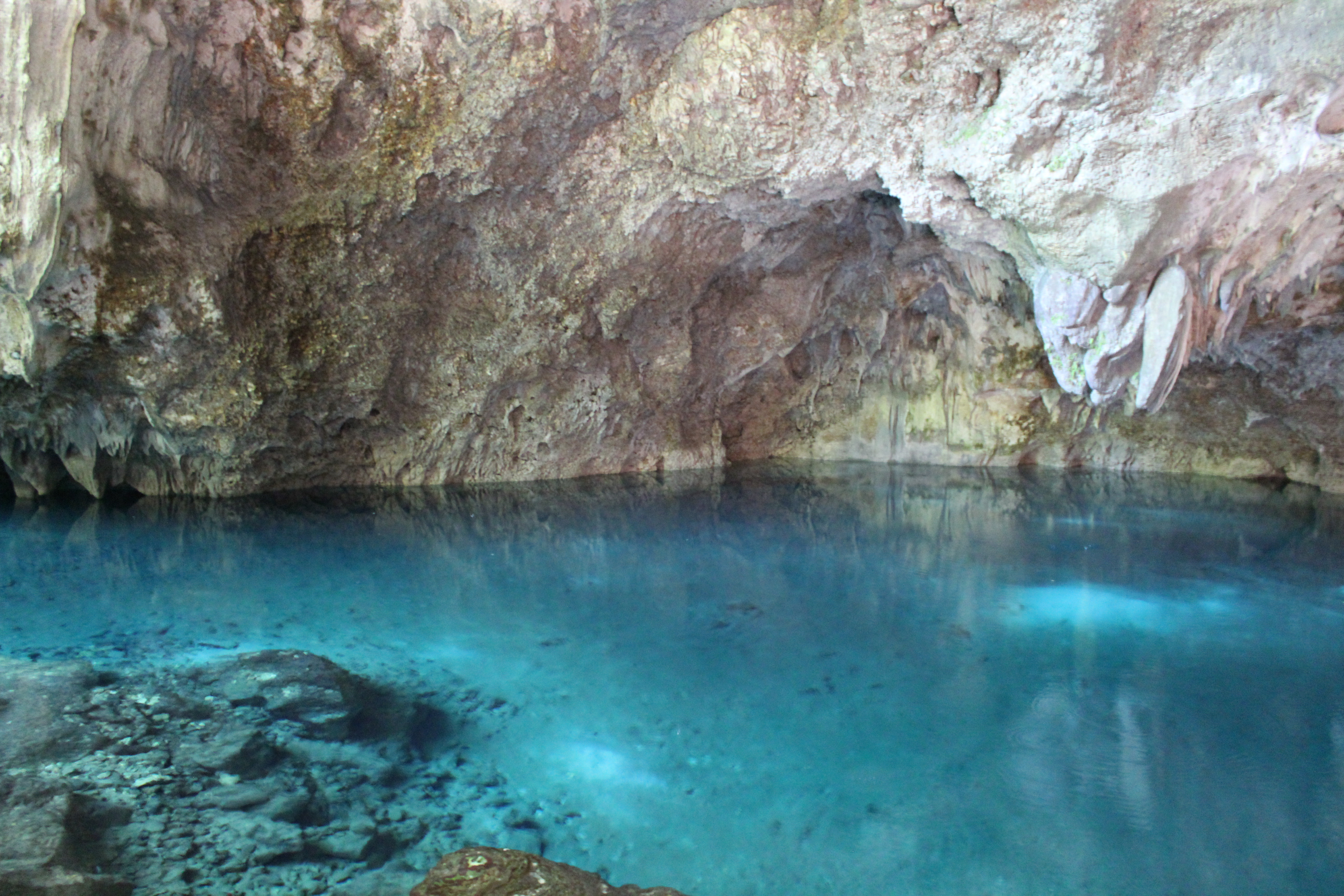
Lago de Azufre

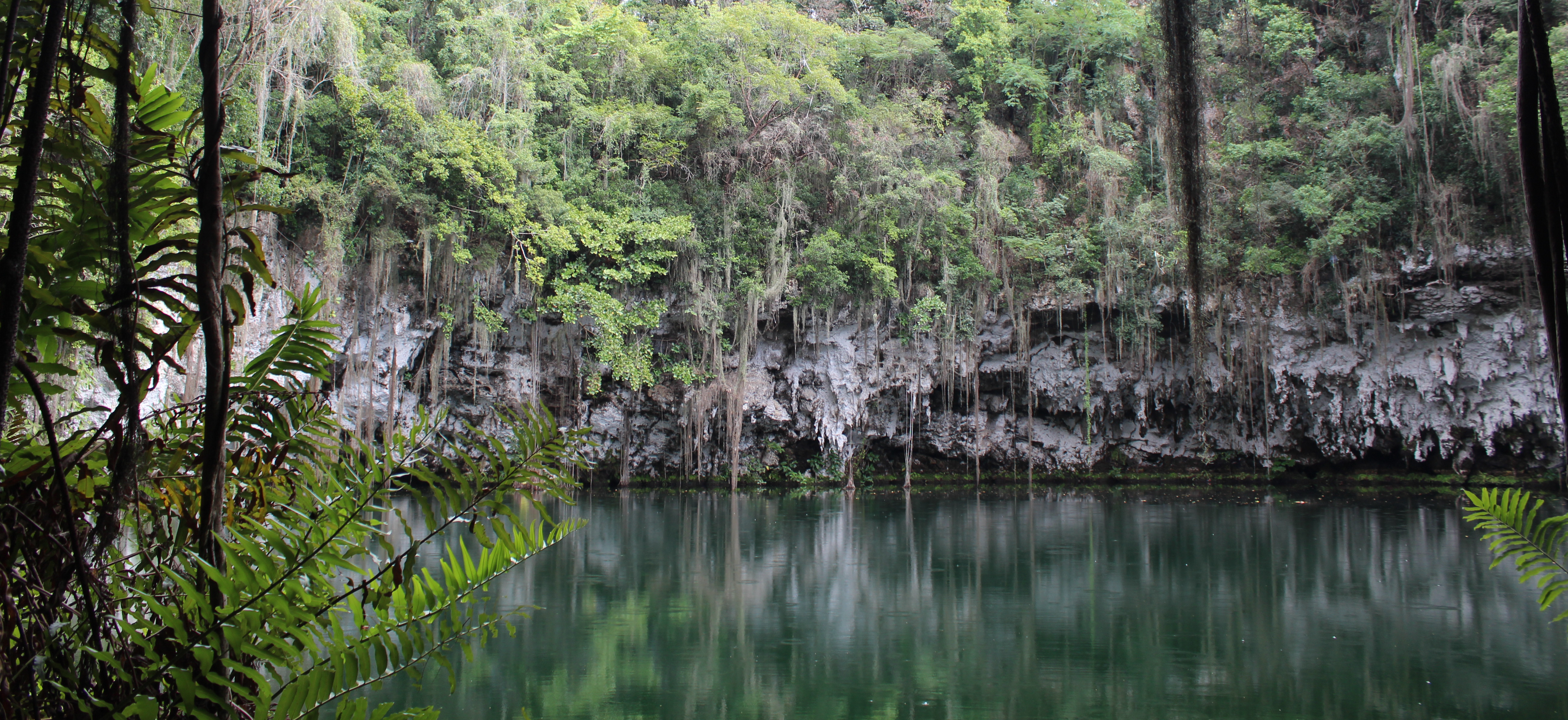
Los Zaramagullones

The Three Eyes National Park (Spanish: Parque Nacional Los Tres Ojos) is a 50-yard open-air limestone cave located in Mirador del Este park, within the Santo Domingo Este municipality of the Dominican Republic. The park features a series of three lakes, or ojos, and is one of the country's most popular tourist attractions.

== History ==
The site was created centuries ago as a result of tectonic fractures when caves collapsed, forming a bowl-shaped depression which subsequently filled with water. Initially, the cave was used by the Indigenous peoples for religious rituals and fertility rites. The three main lakes are called "Lago de Azufre" (discovered in 1916), "La Nevera" and "El Lago de las Damas". Some of the lakes also have openings on the outside. A staircase carved into the rock gives access to the first cave while a boat takes visitors across the second lake to give access to a fourth lake called "Los Zaramagullones". This lake is not considered one of the three "eyes" or main lakes, as it has an opening to the outside.

== Description ==
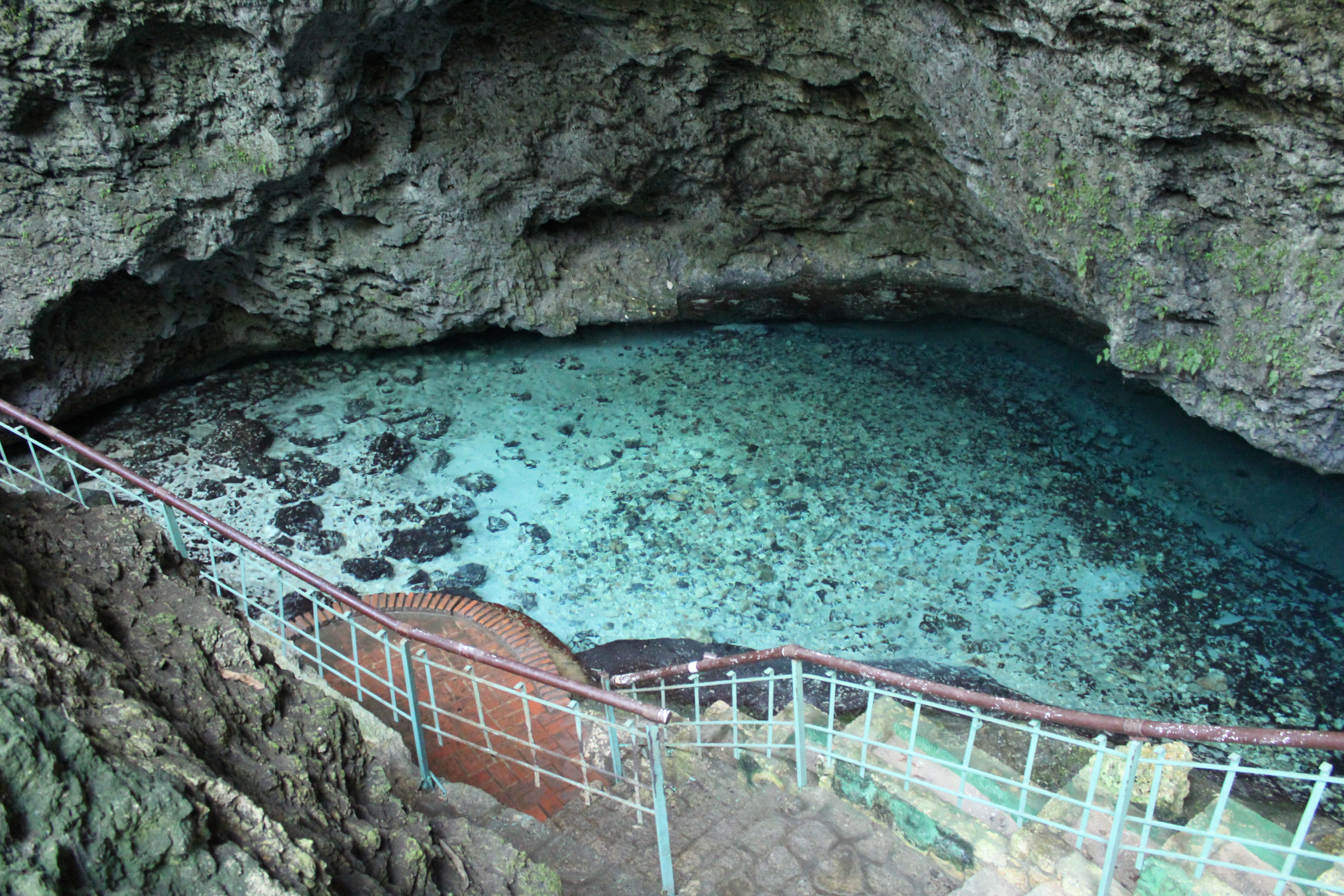
El Lago de las Damas

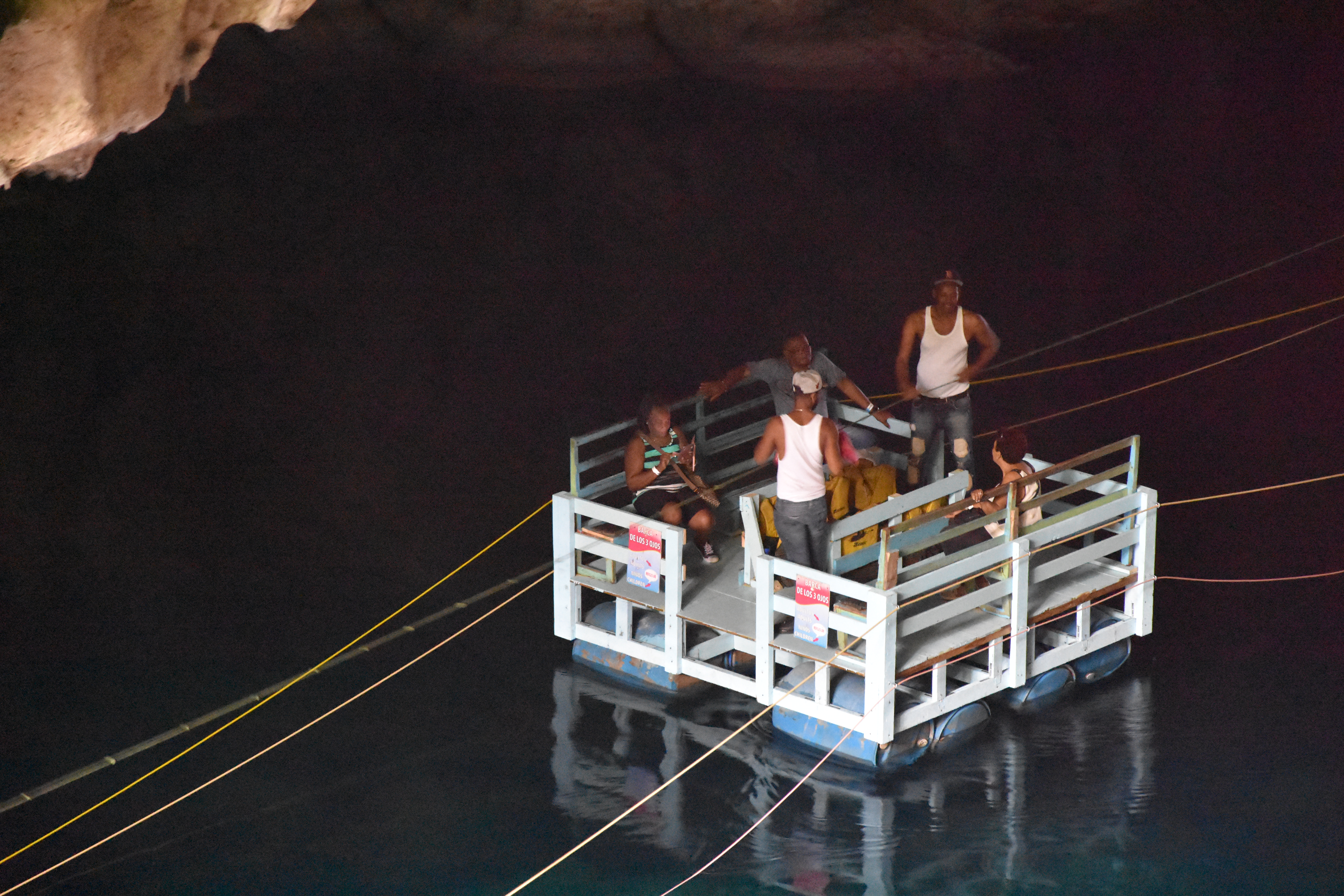
The "ferry" on La Nevera lake

The caves are fed by water from an underground river and surrounded by stalactites and stalagmites. The composition of the water varies. Early explorers believed that the first pond was made up of sulphurous water because of its blue hue. However, after testing, it was discovered that Lago Azufre is actually composed of calcium minerals.

The fourth and deepest lagoon is freshwater. It was stocked with fish back in the 1940s.

The temperature of the lagoons varies between 20 °C to 29 °C, depending on the site. There varying depths create different colored reflections—blue, green, and sometimes yellow. The depth of the shallowest lagoon, Lago de las Damas, has a depth of 8 feet, while the deepest, Los Zaramagullones, reaches 25 feet.

The fauna is also very varied and includes fish, bats and turtles, while the surrounding vegetation is lush and abundant.

To visit all four lagoons, one needs to be able to climb stairs. There are a total of 346 steps connecting the four lagoons.

The furthest lagoon, Lago Los Zaramagullones, can only be accessed by a small ferry raft pulled via rope across Lago La Nevera. Access to the lagoon is free, but you will have to pay a small fee (50 peso or $1 USD per person) by to get out. Los Zaramagullones is often considered the most tranquil and beautiful of the four lagoons. Many production companies have filmed footage here for there movies including: Tarzan, Combat Shock, Jurassic Park III, Oro y Polvo, to mention only a few.

The caves are open from 9 am to 5 pm, and are illuminated at night by many colorful lights.

== See also ==
- Santo Domingo Este
- Cenote
