= 2022 Billie Jean King Cup Americas Zone Group II – Pool C =

Subsection of tennis competition

Pool C of the 2022 Billie Jean King Cup Americas Zone Group II was one of four pools in the Americas zone of the 2022 Billie Jean King Cup. Four teams competed in a round robin competition, with each team proceeding to their respective sections of the play-offs: the top team played for advancement to Group I in 2023.

== Standings ==
		BOL	PUR	ARU	PAN	RR; W–L	Set; W–L	Game; W–L	Standings
3	Bolivia		3–0	3–0	3–0	9–0	18–2 (90%)	118–42 (74%)	1
12	Puerto Rico	0–3		3–0	3–0	6–3	14–6 (70%)	106–52 (67%)	2
–	Aruba	0–3	0–3		3–0	3–6	6–12 (33%)	45–80 (36%)	3
8	Panama	0–3	0–3	0–3		0–9	0–18 (0%)	13–108 (11%)	4

Standings are determined by: 1. number of wins; 2. number of matches; 3. in two-team ties, head-to-head records; 4. in three-team ties, (a) percentage of matches won (head-to-head records if two teams remain tied), then (b) percentage of sets won (head-to-head records if two teams remain tied), then (c) percentage of games won (head-to-head records if two teams remain tied), then (d) Billie Jean King Cup rankings.

== Round-robin ==
=== Bolivia vs. Puerto Rico ===
Bolivia
3
Centro Nacional de Tenis, Santo Domingo Este, Dominican Republic
26 July 2022
Hard

Puerto Rico
0

			1	2	3
1	(Bolivia) (Puerto Rico)	María Olivia Castedo; Julieanne Bou	6; 4	6^{2} 7^{7}	7; 5
2	(Bolivia) (Puerto Rico)	Noelia Zeballos; Sara Isabel Snyder	6; 1	6; 2
3	(Bolivia) (Puerto Rico)	María Fernanda Álvarez Terán / Masha Vrsalovic Giménez; Daniella O'Neill García / Natalia Pérez	2; 6	6; 4	7; 5

=== Panama vs. Aruba ===
Panama
0
Centro Nacional de Tenis, Santo Domingo Este, Dominican Republic
26 July 2022
Hard

Aruba
3

			1	2	3
1	(Panama) (Aruba)	Paola Alejandra Testa Rodríguez; Jelsyvette Kaylyn Croes	1; 6	1; 6
2	(Panama) (Aruba)	Anna Louise Bjørnestad; Kayla Solagnier	1; 6	1; 6
3	(Panama) (Aruba)	Rosaline Zafir Chávez Tello / Paola Alejandra Testa Rodríguez; Danna Nunez / Kayla Solagnier	0; 6	4; 6

=== Bolivia vs. Panama ===
Bolivia
3
Centro Nacional de Tenis, Santo Domingo Este, Dominican Republic
27 July 2022
Hard

Panama
0

			1	2	3
1	(Bolivia) (Panama)	María Olivia Castedo; Anna Louise Bjørnestad	6; 2	6; 0
2	(Bolivia) (Panama)	Noelia Zeballos; Rosaline Zafir Chávez Tello	6; 0	6; 0
3	(Bolivia) (Panama)	Masha Vrsalovic Giménez / Noelia Zeballos; Anna Louise Bjørnestad / Rosaline Zafir Chávez Tello	6; 0	6; 0

=== Puerto Rico vs. Aruba ===
Puerto Rico
3
Centro Nacional de Tenis, Santo Domingo Este, Dominican Republic
27 July 2022
Hard

Aruba
0

			1	2	3
1	(Puerto Rico) (Aruba)	Sara Isabel Snyder; Jelsyvette Kaylyn Croes	6; 1	6; 1
2	(Puerto Rico) (Aruba)	Daniella O'Neill García; Kayla Solagnier	6; 1	6; 0
3	(Puerto Rico) (Aruba)	Julieanne Bou / Natalia Pérez; Jelsyvette Kaylyn Croes / Danna Nunez	6; 0	6; 0

=== Bolivia vs. Aruba ===
Bolivia
3
Centro Nacional de Tenis, Santo Domingo Este, Dominican Republic
29 July 2022
Hard

Aruba
0

			1	2	3
1	(Bolivia) (Aruba)	María Olivia Castedo; Danna Nunez	6; 1	6; 3
2	(Bolivia) (Aruba)	Noelia Zeballos; Kayla Solagnier	6; 0	6; 0
3	(Bolivia) (Aruba)	María Fernanda Álvarez Terán / Masha Vrsalovic Giménez; Jelsyvette Kaylyn Croes / Kayla Solagnier	6; 2	6; 0

=== Panama vs. Puerto Rico ===
Panama
0
Centro Nacional de Tenis, Santo Domingo Este, Dominican Republic
29 July 2022
Hard

Puerto Rico
3

			1	2	3
1	(Panama) (Puerto Rico)	Paola Alejandra Testa Rodríguez; Natalia Pérez	1; 6	0; 6
2	(Panama) (Puerto Rico)	Anna Louise Bjørnestad; Daniella O'Neill García	0; 6	1; 6
3	(Panama) (Puerto Rico)	Rosaline Zafir Chávez Tello / Karla Ching; Julieanne Bou / Sara Isabel Snyder	1; 6	0; 6
