= 2018 Fed Cup Americas Zone Group II – Pool B (Metepec) =

Subsection of tennis competition

Pool B (Metepec) of the 2018 Fed Cup Americas Group II was one of four pools in the Americas Group II of the 2018 Fed Cup. Three teams competed in a round robin competition, with the top team and bottom teams proceeding to their respective sections of the play-offs: the top team played for advancement to Group I.

== Standings ==
		PER	CUB	URU	RR; W–L	Set; W–L	Game; W–L	Standings
3	Peru		2–1	3–0	2–0	11–2 (85%)	72–30 (71%)	1
8	Cuba	1–2		2–1	1–1	6–7 (46%)	54–60 (47%)	2
9	Uruguay	0–3	1–2		0–2	2–10 (17%)	31–67 (32%)	3

Standings are determined by: 1. number of wins; 2. number of matches; 3. in two-team ties, head-to-head records; 4. in three-team ties, (a) percentage of sets won (head-to-head records if two teams remain tied), then (b) percentage of games won (head-to-head records if two teams remain tied), then (c) Fed Cup rankings.

== Round-robin ==
=== Cuba vs. Uruguay ===
Cuba
2
Club Deportivo La Asunción, Metepec, Mexico
20 June
Hard

Uruguay
1

			1	2	3
1	(Cuba) (Uruguay)	Isid Hernández; Fernanda Secinaro	4; 6	2; 6
2	(Cuba) (Uruguay)	Yusleydis Smith Dias; Isabella Tiscornia	6; 4	6; 1
3	(Cuba) (Uruguay)	Yamile Fors Guerra / Yusleydis Smith Dias; Florencia Rossi / Fernanda Secinaro	7; 5	6; 2

=== Peru vs. Uruguay ===
Peru
3
Club Deportivo La Asunción, Metepec, Mexico
21 June
Hard

Uruguay
0

			1	2	3
1	(Peru) (Uruguay)	Dana Guzmán; Fernanda Secinaro	6; 1	6; 2
2	(Peru) (Uruguay)	Anastasia Iamachkine; Isabella Tiscornia	6; 1	6; 2
3	(Peru) (Uruguay)	Dana Guzmán / Camila Soares; Fernanda Secinaro / Isabella Tiscornia	6; 1	6; 0

=== Peru vs. Cuba ===
Peru
2
Club Deportivo La Asunción, Metepec, Mexico
22 June
Hard

Cuba
1

			1	2	3
1	(Peru) (Cuba)	Dana Guzmán; Yoryana Delgado Herrera	6; 1	6; 0
2	(Peru) (Cuba)	Anastasia Iamachkine; Yusleydis Smith Dias	6; 3	6; 2
3	(Peru) (Cuba)	Dana Guzmán / Camila Soares; Yamile Fors Guerra / Yusleydis Smith Dias	6^{2} 7^{7}	6; 4	0; 6

== See also ==
- Fed Cup structure
