= 2018 Fed Cup Americas Zone Group II – Pool A (Metepec) =

Subsection of tennis competition

Pool A (Metepec) of the 2018 Fed Cup Americas Group II was one of four pools in the Americas Group II of the 2018 Fed Cup. Three teams competed in a round robin competition, with the top team and bottom teams proceeding to their respective sections of the play-offs: the top team played for advancement to Group I.

== Standings ==
		MEX	DOM	BAR	RR; W–L	Set; W–L	Game; W–L	Standings
2	Mexico		3–0	3–0	2–0	12–0 (100%)	72–14 (84%)	1
7	Dominican Republic	0–3		2–1	1–1	5–8 (38%)	52–59 (47%)	2
11	Barbados	0–3	1–2		0–2	2–11 (15%)	25–76 (25%)	3

Standings are determined by: 1. number of wins; 2. number of matches; 3. in two-team ties, head-to-head records; 4. in three-team ties, (a) percentage of sets won (head-to-head records if two teams remain tied), then (b) percentage of games won (head-to-head records if two teams remain tied), then (c) Fed Cup rankings.

== Round-robin ==
=== Dominican Republic vs. Barbados ===
Dominican Republic
2
Club Deportivo La Asunción, Metepec, Mexico
20 June
Hard

Barbados
1

			1	2	3
1	(Dominican Republic) (Barbados)	Laura Lisette Quezada Martínez; Gabrielle Leslie	6; 2	4; 6	6^{3} 7^{7}
2	(Dominican Republic) (Barbados)	Francesca Segarelli; Hannah Chambers	6; 2	6; 3
3	(Dominican Republic) (Barbados)	Karla Portalatin / Kelly Williford; Gabrielle Leslie / Tangia Riley-Codrington	6; 2	6; 1

=== Mexico vs. Barbados ===
Mexico
3
Club Deportivo La Asunción, Metepec, Mexico
21 June
Hard

Barbados
0

			1	2	3
1	(Mexico) (Barbados)	María José Portillo Ramírez; Tangia Riley-Codrington	6; 0	6; 0
2	(Mexico) (Barbados)	Marcela Zacarías; Gabrielle Leslie	6; 0	6; 0
3	(Mexico) (Barbados)	Fernanda Contreras Gómez / María José Portillo Ramírez; Hannah Chambers / Tangia Riley-Codrington	6; 2	6; 0

=== Mexico vs. Dominican Republic ===
Mexico
3
Club Deportivo La Asunción, Metepec, Mexico
22 June
Hard

Dominican Republic
0

			1	2	3
1	(Mexico) (Dominican Republic)	Fernanda Contreras Gómez; Francesca Segarelli	6; 1	6; 2
2	(Mexico) (Dominican Republic)	Marcela Zacarías; Kelly Williford	6; 4	6; 1
3	(Mexico) (Dominican Republic)	Daniela Morales Beckmann / María José Portillo Ramírez; Karla Portalatin / Kelly Williford	6; 1	6; 3

== See also ==
- Fed Cup structure
