= 2018 Fed Cup Americas Zone Group II – Pool A (Guayaquil) =

Subsection of tennis competition

Pool A (Guayaquil) of the 2018 Fed Cup Americas Group II was one of four pools in the Americas Group II of the 2018 Fed Cup. Three teams competed in a round robin competition, with the top team and bottom teams proceeding to their respective sections of the play-offs: the top team played for advancement to Group I.

== Standings ==
		ECU	CRC	HON	RR; W–L	Set; W–L	Game; W–L	Standings
1	Ecuador		3–0	3–0	2–0	12–0 (100%)	73–22 (77%)	1
5	Costa Rica	0–3		2–1	1–1	4–9 (31%)	43–67 (39%)	2
12	Honduras	0–3	1–2		0–2	3–10 (23%)	40–67 (37%)	3

Standings are determined by: 1. number of wins; 2. number of matches; 3. in two-team ties, head-to-head records; 4. in three-team ties, (a) percentage of sets won (head-to-head records if two teams remain tied), then (b) percentage of games won (head-to-head records if two teams remain tied), then (c) Fed Cup rankings.

== Round-robin ==
=== Ecuador vs. Honduras ===
Ecuador
3
Centro Nacional de Tenis de la FET, Guayaquil, Ecuador
18 July
Clay

Honduras
0

			1	2	3
1	(Ecuador) (Honduras)	Camila Romero; Daniela Obando	6; 1	6; 1
2	(Ecuador) (Honduras)	Charlotte Römer; Natalie Gabriela Espinal Sánchez	6; 2	6; 4
3	(Ecuador) (Honduras)	Domenica González / Charlotte Römer; Alejandra Obando / Ana Gabriela Zavala Mata	6; 0	6; 2

=== Costa Rica vs. Honduras ===
Costa Rica
2
Centro Nacional de Tenis de la FET, Guayaquil, Ecuador
19 July
Clay

Honduras
1

			1	2	3
1	(Costa Rica) (Honduras)	Eugenia Camacho; Daniela Obando	1; 6	2; 6
2	(Costa Rica) (Honduras)	Ariana Rahmanparast; Natalie Gabriela Espinal Sánchez	6; 4	6; 3
3	(Costa Rica) (Honduras)	Sofía Pérez / Ariana Rahmanparast; Natalie Gabriela Espinal Sánchez / Daniela Obando	6; 1	4; 6	6; 4

=== Ecuador vs. Costa Rica ===
Ecuador
3
Centro Nacional de Tenis de la FET, Guayaquil, Ecuador
20 July
Clay

Costa Rica
0

			1	2	3
1	(Ecuador) (Costa Rica)	Camila Romero; Sofía Pérez	7; 5	6; 2
2	(Ecuador) (Costa Rica)	Charlotte Römer; Ariana Rahmanparast	6; 0	6; 3
3	(Ecuador) (Costa Rica)	Domenica González / Charlotte Römer; Eugenia Camacho / Sofía Pérez	6; 0	6; 2

== See also ==
- Fed Cup structure
