= 2018 Fed Cup Americas Zone Group II – Pool B (Guayaquil) =

Subsection of tennis competition

Pool B (Guayaquil) of the 2018 Fed Cup Americas Group II was one of four pools in the Americas Group II of the 2018 Fed Cup. Four teams competed in a round robin competition, with the top team and bottom teams proceeding to their respective sections of the play-offs: the top team played for advancement to Group I.

== Standings ==
		BAH	BOL	TTO	BER	RR; W–L	Set; W–L	Game; W–L	Standings
10	Bahamas		2–1	2–1	3–0	3–0	14–5 (74%)	100–51 (66%)	1
4	Bolivia	1–2		2–1	3–0	2–1	13–6 (68%)	95–76 (56%)	2
6	Trinidad and Tobago	1–2	1–2		3–0	1–2	11–9 (55%)	100–78 (56%)	3
13	Bermuda	0–3	0–3	0–3		0–3	0–18 (0%)	18–108 (14%)	4

Standings are determined by: 1. number of wins; 2. number of matches; 3. in two-team ties, head-to-head records; 4. in three-team ties, (a) percentage of sets won (head-to-head records if two teams remain tied), then (b) percentage of games won (head-to-head records if two teams remain tied), then (c) Fed Cup rankings.

== Round-robin ==
=== Bolivia vs. Bahamas ===
Bolivia
1
Centro Nacional de Tenis de la FET, Guayaquil, Ecuador
18 July
Clay

Bahamas
2

			1	2	3
1	(Bolivia) (The Bahamas)	Daniela Alejandra la Fuente Strassburger; Danielle Andrea Thompson	3; 6	2; 6
2	(Bolivia) (The Bahamas)	Noelia Zeballos; Kerrie Cartwright	0; 6	3; 6
3	(Bolivia) (The Bahamas)	Daniela Alejandra la Fuente Strassburger / Noelia Zeballos; Sierra Donaldson / Simone Pratt	7; 5	6; 2

=== Trinidad and Tobago vs. Bermuda ===
Trinidad and Tobago
3
Centro Nacional de Tenis de la FET, Guayaquil, Ecuador
18 July
Clay

Bermuda
0

			1	2	3
1	(Trinidad and Tobago) (Bermuda)	Breana Stampfli; Shelby Madeiros	6; 0	6; 0
2	(Trinidad and Tobago) (Bermuda)	Yolande Leacock; Ashley Brooks	6; 1	6; 3
3	(Trinidad and Tobago) (Bermuda)	Anneliese Rose / Breana Stampfli; Ashley Brooks / Kirstin Saltus	6; 0	6; 3

=== Bolivia vs. Bermuda ===
Bolivia
3
Centro Nacional de Tenis de la FET, Guayaquil, Ecuador
19 July
Clay

Bermuda
0

			1	2	3
1	(Bolivia) (Bermuda)	Daniela Alejandra la Fuente Strassburger; Shelby Madeiros	6; 0	6; 4
2	(Bolivia) (Bermuda)	Noelia Zeballos; Ashley Brooks	6; 3	6; 1
3	(Bolivia) (Bermuda)	Daniela Alejandra la Fuente Strassburger / Noelia Zeballos; Jahzuena Bradshaw-Douglas / Kirstin Saltus	6; 0	6; 0

=== Trinidad and Tobago vs. Bahamas ===
Trinidad and Tobago
1
Centro Nacional de Tenis de la FET, Guayaquil, Ecuador
19 July
Clay

Bahamas
2

			1	2	3
1	(Trinidad and Tobago) (The Bahamas)	Breana Stampfli; Danielle Andrea Thompson	6; 3	6; 2
2	(Trinidad and Tobago) (The Bahamas)	Yolande Leacock; Kerrie Cartwright	6; 4	2; 6	0; 0	retired
3	(Trinidad and Tobago) (The Bahamas)	Anneliese Rose / Breana Stampfli; Kerrie Cartwright / Simone Pratt	4; 6	3; 6

=== Bolivia vs. Trinidad and Tobago ===
Bolivia
2
Centro Nacional de Tenis de la FET, Guayaquil, Ecuador
20 July
Clay

Trinidad and Tobago
1

			1	2	3
1	(Bolivia) (Trinidad and Tobago)	Daniela Alejandra la Fuente Strassburger; Carlista Mohammed	6; 4	6; 3
2	(Bolivia) (Trinidad and Tobago)	Noelia Zeballos; Breana Stampfli	7; 5	7^{9} 6^{7}
3	(Bolivia) (Trinidad and Tobago)	Susan Salinas / Sofía Cristina Taborga Rollano; Carlista Mohammed / Breana Stampfli	5; 7	7^{7} 6^{5}	0; 6

=== Bahamas vs. Bermuda ===
Bahamas
3
Centro Nacional de Tenis de la FET, Guayaquil, Ecuador
20 July
Clay

Bermuda
0

			1	2	3
1	(The Bahamas) (Bermuda)	Danielle Andrea Thompson; Shelby Madeiras	6; 0	6; 1
2	(The Bahamas) (Bermuda)	Kerrie Cartwright; Ashley Brooks	6; 0	6; 0
3	(The Bahamas) (Bermuda)	Sierra Donaldson / Simone Pratt; Jahzuena Bradshaw-Douglas / Kirstin Saltus	6; 1	6; 1

== See also ==
- Fed Cup structure
