= 2022 Billie Jean King Cup Americas Zone Group I – Pool B =

Subsection of tennis competition

Pool B of the 2022 Billie Jean King Cup Americas Zone Group I was one of two pools in the Americas zone of the 2020–21 Billie Jean King Cup. Four teams competed in a round robin competition, with the top teams and the bottom teams proceeding to their respective sections of the play-offs: the top teams played for advancement to 2022 Billie Jean King Cup Play-offs.

== Standings ==
		MEX	CHI	ECU	PAR	RR; W–L	Set; W–L	Game; W–L	Standings
4	Mexico		2–1	3–0	3–0	8–1	17–3 (85%)	115–57 (67%)	1
5	Chile	1–2		3–0	3–0	7–2	15–5 (75%)	110–71 (61%)	2
8	Ecuador	0–3	0–3		2–1	2–7	4–14 (22%)	58–96 (38%)	3
2	Paraguay	0–3	0–3	1–2		1–8	2–16 (11%)	44–103 (30%)	4

Standings are determined by: 1. number of wins; 2. number of matches; 3. in two-team ties, head-to-head records; 4. in three-team ties, (a) percentage of matches won (head-to-head records if two teams remain tied), then (b) percentage of sets won (head-to-head records if two teams remain tied), then (c) percentage of games won (head-to-head records if two teams remain tied), then (d) Billie Jean King Cup rankings.

== Round-robin ==
=== Paraguay vs. Ecuador ===
Paraguay
1
Salinas Golf and Tennis Club, Salinas, Ecuador
13 April 2022
Hard

Ecuador
2

			1	2	3
1	(Paraguay) (Ecuador)	Leyla Fiorella Brítez Risso; Charlotte Römer	6; 4	6; 2
2	(Paraguay) (Ecuador)	Susan Doldán; Mell Reasco	1; 6	0; 6
3	(Paraguay) (Ecuador)	Leyla Fiorella Brítez Risso / Paulina Franco Martinessi; Domenica González / Mell Reasco	5; 7	4; 6

=== Mexico vs. Chile ===
Mexico
2
Salinas Golf and Tennis Club, Salinas, Ecuador
13 April 2022
Hard

Chile
1

			1	2	3
1	(Mexico) (Chile)	Marcela Zacarías; Bárbara Gatica	6; 3	6; 4
2	(Mexico) (Chile)	Renata Zarazúa; Daniela Seguel	5; 7	6; 4	6; 3
3	(Mexico) (Chile)	Fernanda Contreras Gómez / Giuliana Olmos; Bárbara Gatica / Alexa Guarachi	2; 6	6; 3	5; 7

=== Paraguay vs. Chile ===
Paraguay
0
Salinas Golf and Tennis Club, Salinas, Ecuador
14 April 2022
Hard

Chile
3

			1	2	3
1	(Paraguay) (Chile)	Paulina Franco Martinessi; Fernanda Labraña	2; 6	3; 6
2	(Paraguay) (Chile)	Leyla Fiorella Brítez Risso; Bárbara Gatica	3; 6	2; 6
3	(Paraguay) (Chile)	Heydi Doldán / Susan Doldán; Fernanda Astete / Alexa Guarachi	3; 6	4; 6

=== Mexico vs. Ecuador ===
Mexico
3
Salinas Golf and Tennis Club, Salinas, Ecuador
14 April 2022
Hard

Ecuador
0

			1	2	3
1	(Mexico) (Ecuador)	Giuliana Olmos; Tania Isabel Andrade Sabando	7^{7} 6^{5}	6; 1
2	(Mexico) (Ecuador)	Fernanda Contreras Gómez; Mell Reasco	6; 1	6; 4
3	(Mexico) (Ecuador)	Fernanda Contreras Gómez / Giuliana Olmos; Tania Isabel Andrade Sabando / Charlotte Römer	6; 2	6; 1

=== Paraguay vs. Mexico ===
Paraguay
0
Salinas Golf and Tennis Club, Salinas, Ecuador
15 April 2022
Hard

Mexico
3

			1	2	3
1	(Paraguay) (Mexico)	Leyla Fiorella Brítez Risso; Marcela Zacarías	1; 6	1; 6
2	(Paraguay) (Mexico)	Susan Doldán; Fernanda Contreras Gómez	0; 6	0; 6
3	(Paraguay) (Mexico)	Leyla Fiorella Brítez Risso / Paulina Franco Martinessi; Fernanda Contreras Gómez / Giuliana Olmos	0; 6	3; 6

=== Chile vs. Ecuador ===
Chile
3
Salinas Golf and Tennis Club, Salinas, Ecuador
15 April 2022
Hard

Ecuador
0

			1	2	3
1	(Chile) (Ecuador)	Bárbara Gatica; Valeska Alexandra San Martín Ramírez	6; 1	6; 0
2	(Chile) (Ecuador)	Daniela Seguel; Charlotte Römer	7; 5	6; 2
3	(Chile) (Ecuador)	Bárbara Gatica / Alexa Guarachi; Domenica González / Mell Reasco	6; 1	6; 3
