= Club Deportivo Potosino =

Sports club located in San Luis Potosí

- Formation: 1940
- Type: Private Members Club
- Location: San Luis Potosí, Mexico
- Official language: Spanish
- Website: Official website

The Club Deportivo Potosino is a sports club located in the city of San Luis Potosí, in the Mexican state of the same name. Founded in 1940, it is the oldest sports club in the city, nationally renowned for its high performance in various sports disciplines such as swimming and tennis. The club is commonly referenced as the birthplace of the Michelada, with claims stating that a member called Michel Ésper used to order his daily beer with salt and lemon juice, eventually giving origin to the name.

The Club Deportivo Potosino also hosts the San Luis Tennis Open, an annual ATP Challenger Tour tournament, that counts among its winners international top athletes such as Joaquín Loyo-Mayo, Leonardo Lavalle, Dick Norman, Guido Pella, Marcelo Arévalo.
