= 2022 Billie Jean King Cup Americas Zone Group II – Pool B =

Subsection of tennis competition

Pool B of the 2022 Billie Jean King Cup Americas Zone Group II was one of four pools in the Americas zone of the 2022 Billie Jean King Cup. Four teams competed in a round robin competition, with each team proceeding to their respective sections of the play-offs: the top team played for advancement to Group I in 2023.

== Standings ==
		PER	VEN	CUB	ISV	RR; W–L	Set; W–L	Game; W–L	Standings
2	Peru		3–0	3–0	3–0	9–0	18–1 (95%)	115–42 (73%)	1
5	Venezuela	0–3		3–0	3–0	6–3	13–6 (68%)	100–58 (63%)	2
10	Cuba	0–3	0–3		3–0	3–6	6–12 (33%)	56–79 (41%)	3
–	U.S. Virgin Islands	0–3	0–3	0–3		0–9	0–18 (0%)	16–108 (13%)	4

Standings are determined by: 1. number of wins; 2. number of matches; 3. in two-team ties, head-to-head records; 4. in three-team ties, (a) percentage of matches won (head-to-head records if two teams remain tied), then (b) percentage of sets won (head-to-head records if two teams remain tied), then (c) percentage of games won (head-to-head records if two teams remain tied), then (d) Billie Jean King Cup rankings.

== Round-robin ==
=== Peru vs. Cuba ===
Peru
3
Centro Nacional de Tenis Parque del Este, Santo Domingo, Dominican Republic
25 July 2022
Hard

Cuba
0

			1	2	3
1	(Peru) (Cuba)	Anastasia Iamachkine; Roxana Valdez	6; 1	6; 2
2	(Peru) (Cuba)	Romina Ccuno; Sachely Carrera	6; 1	6; 2
3	(Peru) (Cuba)	Anastasia Iamachkine / Camila Soares; Sachely Carrera / Roxana Valdez	6; 3	6; 3

=== Venezuela vs. U.S. Virgin Islands ===
Venezuela
3
Centro Nacional de Tenis Parque del Este, Santo Domingo, Dominican Republic
25 July 2022
Hard

U.S. Virgin Islands
0

			1	2	3
1	(Venezuela) (United States Virgin Islands)	Daniela Rivera; Malena del Olmo	6; 2	6; 0
2	(Venezuela) (United States Virgin Islands)	Isabella Colmenares; Lisa Messier	6; 2	6; 1
3	(Venezuela) (United States Virgin Islands)	Nadia Echeverría Alam / Vanesa Suárez; Malena del Olmo / Lisa Messier	6; 2	6; 0

=== Peru vs. U.S. Virgin Islands ===
Peru
3
Centro Nacional de Tenis Parque del Este, Santo Domingo, Dominican Republic
27 July 2022
Hard

U.S. Virgin Islands
0

			1	2	3
1	(Peru) (United States Virgin Islands)	Anastasia Iamachkine; Natasha Messier	6; 0	6; 1
2	(Peru) (United States Virgin Islands)	Romina Ccuno; Maykayla Ramos	6; 0	6; 0
3	(Peru) (United States Virgin Islands)	Dana Guzmán / Lucciana Pérez Alarcón; Malena del Olmo / Lisa Messier	6; 0	6; 1

=== Venezuela vs. Cuba ===
Venezuela
3
Centro Nacional de Tenis Parque del Este, Santo Domingo, Dominican Republic
27 July 2022
Hard

Cuba
0

			1	2	3
1	(Venezuela) (Cuba)	Vanesa Suárez; Roxana Valdez	6; 2	6; 2
2	(Venezuela) (Cuba)	Nadia Echeverría Alam; Sachely Carrera	6; 0	6; 0
3	(Venezuela) (Cuba)	Isabella Colmenares / Daniela Rivera; Sachely Carrera / Yasmin Reyes	6; 2	6; 2

=== Peru vs. Venezuela ===
Peru
3
Centro Nacional de Tenis Parque del Este, Santo Domingo, Dominican Republic
28 July 2022
Hard

Venezuela
0

			1	2	3
1	(Peru) (Venezuela)	Anastasia Iamachkine; Vanesa Suárez	5; 7	7^{7} 6^{0}	6; 2
2	(Peru) (Venezuela)	Romina Ccuno; Nadia Echeverría Alam	6; 3	6; 4
3	(Peru) (Venezuela)	Dana Guzmán / Lucciana Pérez Alarcón; Isabella Colmenares / Daniela Rivera	7; 5	6; 1

=== Cuba vs. U.S. Virgin Islands ===
Cuba
3
Centro Nacional de Tenis Parque del Este, Santo Domingo, Dominican Republic
28 July 2022
Hard

U.S. Virgin Islands
0

			1	2	3
1	(Cuba) (United States Virgin Islands)	Roxana Valdez; Malena del Olmo	6; 3	6; 2
2	(Cuba) (United States Virgin Islands)	Sachely Carrera; Lisa Messier	6; 0	6; 2
3	(Cuba) (United States Virgin Islands)	Sachely Carrera / Roxana Valdez; Malena del Olmo / Lisa Messier	6; 0	6; 0
