= 2019 Fed Cup Americas Zone Group II – Pool A (Lima) =

Subsection of tennis competition

Pool A (Lima) of the 2019 Fed Cup Americas Group II was one of three pools in the Americas Group II of the 2018 Fed Cup. Three teams competed in a round robin competition, with the top team and bottom teams proceeding to their respective sections of the play-offs: the top team played for advancement to Group I.

== Standings ==
		PER	BOL	PAN	RR; W–L	Set; W–L	Game; W–L	Standings
1	Peru		2–1	3–0	2–0	10–3 (77%)	69–32 (68%)	1
7	Bolivia	1–2		3–0	1–1	9–5 (64%)	68–43 (61%)	2
12	Panama	0–3	0–3		0–2	1–12 (8%)	14–76 (16%)	3

Standings are determined by: 1. number of wins; 2. number of matches; 3. in two-team ties, head-to-head records; 4. in three-team ties, (a) percentage of sets won (head-to-head records if two teams remain tied), then (b) percentage of games won (head-to-head records if two teams remain tied), then (c) Fed Cup rankings.

== Round-robin ==
=== Peru vs. Panama ===
Peru
3
Tennis Club Las Terrazas Miraflores, Lima, Peru
17 April 2019
Clay

Panama
0

			1	2	3
1	(Peru) (Panama)	Anastasia Iamachkine; Zulay Castañeda	6; 2	6; 0
2	(Peru) (Panama)	Dana Guzmán; Karen Esther Contreras	6; 0	6; 0
3	(Peru) (Panama)	Anastasia Iamachkine / Camila Soares; Zulay Castañeda / Yeniseik Gómez	6; 2	6; 0

=== Bolivia vs. Panama ===
Bolivia
3
Tennis Club Las Terrazas Miraflores, Lima, Peru
18 April 2019
Clay

Panama
0

			1	2	3
1	(Bolivia) (Panama)	Paola Cortez Vargas; Zulay Castañeda	4; 6	6; 1	6; 0
2	(Bolivia) (Panama)	Noelia Zeballos; Karen Esther Contreras	6; 2	6; 0
3	(Bolivia) (Panama)	María Fernanda Álvarez Terán / Noelia Zeballos; Yeniseik Gómez / Paola Alejandra Testa Rodríguez	6; 1	6; 0

=== Peru vs. Bolivia ===
Peru
2
Tennis Club Las Terrazas Miraflores, Lima, Peru
19 April 2019
Clay

Bolivia
1

			1	2	3
1	(Peru) (Bolivia)	Anastasia Iamachkine; María Fernanda Álvarez Terán	4; 6	6; 1	6; 1
2	(Peru) (Bolivia)	Dana Guzmán; Noelia Zeballos	4; 6	0; 6
3	(Peru) (Bolivia)	Anastasia Iamachkine / Camila Soares; María Fernanda Álvarez Terán / Noelia Zeballos	6; 3	7; 5

== See also ==
- Fed Cup structure
