= 2019 Fed Cup Americas Zone Group II – Pool B (Lima) =

Subsection of tennis competition

Pool B (Lima) of the 2019 Fed Cup Americas Group II was one of three pools in the Americas Group II of the 2018 Fed Cup. Three teams competed in a round robin competition, with the top team and bottom teams proceeding to their respective sections of the play-offs: the top team played for advancement to Group I.

== Standings ==
		BAH	TTO	BAR	RR; W–L	Set; W–L	Game; W–L	Standings
6	Bahamas		2–1	3–0	2–0	10–3 (77%)	83–41 (67%)	1
9	Trinidad and Tobago	1–2		3–0	1–1	9–4 (69%)	60–41 (59%)	2
11	Barbados	0–3	0–3		0–2	1–12 (8%)	19–80 (19%)	3

Standings are determined by: 1. number of wins; 2. number of matches; 3. in two-team ties, head-to-head records; 4. in three-team ties, (a) percentage of sets won (head-to-head records if two teams remain tied), then (b) percentage of games won (head-to-head records if two teams remain tied), then (c) Fed Cup rankings.

== Round-robin ==
=== Bahamas vs. Barbados ===
Bahamas
3
Tennis Club Las Terrazas Miraflores, Lima, Peru
17 April 2019
Clay

Barbados
0

			1	2	3
1	(The Bahamas) (Barbados)	Danielle Andrea Thompson; Melena Lopez	6; 0	6; 0
2	(The Bahamas) (Barbados)	Kerrie Cartwright; Tangia Riley-Codrington	6; 0	6; 0
3	(The Bahamas) (Barbados)	Sydney Clarke / Sierra Donaldson; Melena Lopez / Chloe Weekes	7; 5	6^{1} 7^{7}	7; 5

=== Trinidad and Tobago vs. Barbados ===
Trinidad and Tobago
3
Tennis Club Las Terrazas Miraflores, Lima, Peru
18 April 2019
Clay

Barbados
0

			1	2	3
1	(Trinidad and Tobago) (Barbados)	Breana Stampfli; Chloe Weekes	6; 0	6; 1
2	(Trinidad and Tobago) (Barbados)	Yolande Leacock; Tangia Riley-Codrington	6; 0	6; 0
3	(Trinidad and Tobago) (Barbados)	Anneliese Rose / Breana Stampfli; Tangia Riley-Codrington / Chloe Weekes	6; 0	6; 1

=== Bahamas vs. Trinidad and Tobago ===
Bahamas
2
Tennis Club Las Terrazas Miraflores, Lima, Peru
19 April 2019
Clay

Trinidad and Tobago
1

			1	2	3
1	(The Bahamas) (Trinidad and Tobago)	Danielle Andrea Thompson; Breana Stampfli	6^{4} 7^{7}	5; 7
2	(The Bahamas) (Trinidad and Tobago)	Kerrie Cartwright; Anya King	6; 0	6; 0
3	(The Bahamas) (Trinidad and Tobago)	Kerrie Cartwright / Sierra Donaldson; Anneliese Rose / Breana Stampfli	6; 1	4; 6	6; 3

== See also ==
- Fed Cup structure
