= Aruba Billie Jean King Cup team =

Aruban women's tennis team

Aruba
- First year: 2022
- Years played: 1
- Ties played (W–L): 4 (1–3)
- Best finish: Zonal Group II RR
- Most total wins: Kayla Solagnier (2–3)
- Most singles wins: Jelsyvette Kaylyn Croes (1–1), Kayla Solagnier (1–2)
- Most doubles wins: Kayla Solagnier (1–1), Danna Nunez (1–1)
- Best doubles team: Danna Nunez & Kayla Solagnier (1–0)
- Most ties played: Danna Nunez, Kayla Solagnier, Jelsyvette Kaylyn Croes (4)
- Most years played: Kayla Solaniger (1); Jelsyvette Kaylyn Croes (1); Danna Nunez (1)

The Aruba Billie Jean King Cup team represents Aruba in Billie Jean King Cup tennis competition and are governed by the Aruba Lawn Tennis Bond. They currently compete in the Americas Zone of Group II.

== History ==
Aruba competed in its first Billie Jean King Cup in 2022. Their best result was finishing third in their Group II pool in 2022.

== Players ==
Player	W-L (Total)	W-L (Singles)	W-L (Doubles)	Ties	Debut	Ref
Jelsyvette Kaylyn Croes	1–3	1–1	0–2	4	2022	
Danna Nunez	1–3	0–2	1–1	4	2022	
Kayla Solagnier	2–3	1–2	1–1	4	2022	

== Recent performances ==
Here is the list of all match-ups of the Aruba participation in the Billie Jean King Cup in 2022.

Year	Competition	Date	Surface	Venue	Opponent	Score	Result
2022	Americas Zone Group II, Pool C	26 July	Hard	Centro Nacional de Tenis Parque del Este (DOM)	Panama	3–0	Win
2022	Americas Zone Group II, Pool C	27 July	Hard	Centro Nacional de Tenis Parque del Este (DOM)	Puerto Rico	0–3	Loss
2022	Americas Zone Group II, Pool C	29 July	Hard	Centro Nacional de Tenis Parque del Este (DOM)	Bolivia	0–3	Loss
2022	Americas Zone Group II, 9th place play-off	30 July	Hard	Centro Nacional de Tenis Parque del Este (DOM)	El Salvador	0–2	Loss

== See also ==
- Billie Jean King Cup
- Aruba Davis Cup team
