= U.S. Virgin Islands Billie Jean King Cup team =

U.S. Virgin Islands
- First year: 2022
- Years played: 2
- Ties played (W–L): 9 (2-7)
- Best finish: Zonal Group III 7th Place
- Most total wins: Malena del Olmo (5-10)
- Most singles wins: Malena del Olmo (3–5)
- Most ties played: Malena del Olmo (9)
- Most years played: Maykayla Ramos (2); Malena del Olmo (2); Lisa Messier (2); Natasha Messier (2)

The U.S. Virgin Islands Billie Jean King Cup team represents the United States Virgin Islands in Billie Jean King Cup tennis competition and are governed by the Virgin Islands Tennis Association. They currently compete in the Americas Zone of Group III.

== History ==
The U.S. Virgin Islands competed in its first Billie Jean King Cup in 2022. Their best result was finishing third in their Group III pool in 2023.

== Players ==
Player	W-L (Total)	W-L (Singles)	W-L (Doubles)	Ties	Debut	Ref
Malena del Olmo	5-10	3-5	2-5	9	2022	
Lisa Messier	3–9	2–5	1–4	8	2022	
Natasha Messier	1–2	0–1	1-1	3	2022	
Maykayla Ramos	0–4	0–2	0-2	4	2022	

== Recent performances ==
Here is the list of all match-ups of the U.S. Virgin Islands participation in the Billie Jean King Cup.

Year	Competition	Date	Surface	Venue	Opponent	Score	Result
2023	Americas Zone Group III, Pool B	17 July	Clay	Federación Panameña de Tenis, Panama City, Panama	Panama	0-3	Loss
2023	Americas Zone Group III, Pool B	18 July	Clay	Federación Panameña de Tenis, Panama City, Panama	Jamaica	0-3	Loss
2023	Americas Zone Group III, Pool B	20 July	Clay	Federación Panameña de Tenis, Panama City, Panama	Aruba	3-0	Win
2023	Americas Zone Group III, Pool B	21 July	Clay	Federación Panameña de Tenis, Panama City, Panama	El Salvador	3-0	Win
2023	Americas Zone Group III, Americas III 5th to 8th Play-Off	22 July	Clay	Federación Panameña de Tenis, Panama City, Panama	Barbados	0-2	Loss
2022	Americas Zone Group II, Pool B	25 July	Hard	Centro Nacional de Tenis Parque del Este (DOM)	Venezuela	0–3	Loss
2022	Americas Zone Group II, Pool B	27 July	Hard	Centro Nacional de Tenis Parque del Este (DOM)	Peru	0–3	Loss
2022	Americas Zone Group II, Pool B	29 July	Hard	Centro Nacional de Tenis Parque del Este (DOM)	Cuba	0–3	Loss
2022	Americas Zone Group II, 13th place play-off	30 July	Hard	Centro Nacional de Tenis Parque del Este (DOM)	Jamaica	1–2	Loss

== See also ==
- Billie Jean King Cup
- U.S. Virgin Islands Davis Cup team
