= 2022 Billie Jean King Cup play-offs =

Part of tennis tournament

The 2022 Billie Jean King Cup play-offs were held from 11 to 12 November 2022.

== Teams ==
Sixteen teams played for eight spots in the 2023 qualifying round, in series decided on a home and away basis.

These sixteen teams were:

- 6 losing teams from qualifying round.
- 7 winning teams from their Group I zone.
- 2 later promoted teams from Zonal Group I (Serbia and Mexico) to fill the vacancy of Russia and Belarus.
- 1 later promoted team from Zonal Group I (Austria) to fill the vacancy of Great Britain, which was announced as Final hosts.

The eight winners of this round qualify for the 2023 qualifying round while the eight losers will contest their respective regional Group I event in 2023.

Seeded teams

1. France (#2)
2. Germany (#10)
3. Romania (#13)
4. Latvia (#16)
5. Japan (#18)
6. Brazil (#19)
7. China (#20)
8. Serbia (#21)

Unseeded teams

- Mexico (#22)
- Argentina (#23)
- Hungary (#24)
- Ukraine (#26)
- Croatia (#29)
- Austria (#33)
- Slovenia (#36)
- Netherlands (#37)

== Results summary ==
Home team	Score	Away team	Location	Venue	Surface
France [1]	3–1	Netherlands	Le Portel	Le Chaudron	Hard (i)
Croatia	1–3	Germany [2]	Rijeka	Sportska Dvorana Zamet	Hard (i)
Romania [3]	4–0	Hungary	Oradea	Sala Polivalentă	Hard (i)
Austria	3–2	Latvia [4]	Schwechat	Multiversum	Clay (i)
Japan [5]	1–3	Ukraine	Tokyo	Ariake Coliseum	Hard (i)
Argentina	1–3	Brazil [6]	Tucumán	Lawn Tennis Club	Clay
Slovenia	3–1	China [7]	Velenje	Bela Dvorana	Clay (i)
Mexico	4–0	Serbia [8]	San Luis Potosí	Club Deportivo Potosino	Clay

== Results ==
=== France vs. Netherlands ===
France
3
Le Chaudron, Le Portel, France
11–12 November 2022
Hard (i)

Netherlands
1

			1	2	3
1	(France) (Netherlands)	Alizé Cornet; Lesley Pattinama Kerkhove	6; 2	6; 0
2	(France) (Netherlands)	Diane Parry; Suzan Lamens	6^{5} 7^{7}	6; 2	7^{7} 6^{3}
3	(France) (Netherlands)	Caroline Garcia; Lesley Pattinama Kerkhove	6; 2	6; 3
4	(France) (Netherlands)	Alizé Cornet; Suzan Lamens				not played
5	(France) (Netherlands)	Chloé Paquet / Diane Parry; Suzan Lamens / Demi Schuurs	1; 6	1; 6

=== Croatia vs. Germany ===
Croatia
1
Sportska Dvorana Zamet, Rijeka, Croatia
11–12 November 2022
Hard (i)

Germany
3

			1	2	3
1	(Croatia) (Germany)	Petra Martić; Eva Lys	1; 6	4; 6
2	(Croatia) (Germany)	Petra Marčinko; Jule Niemeier	6; 3	6; 2
3	(Croatia) (Germany)	Ana Konjuh; Jule Niemeier	2; 6	1; 6
4	(Croatia) (Germany)	Petra Marčinko; Anna-Lena Friedsam	4; 6	1; 6
5	(Croatia) (Germany)	Ana Konjuh / Petra Martić; Anna-Lena Friedsam / Laura Siegemund				not played

=== Romania vs. Hungary ===
Romania
4
Sala Polivalentă, Oradea, Romania
11–12 November 2022
Hard (i)

Hungary
0

			1	2	3
1	(Romania) (Hungary)	Ana Bogdan; Dalma Gálfi	6; 1	6; 4
2	(Romania) (Hungary)	Jaqueline Cristian; Anna Bondár	6; 2	4; 6	7^{7} 6^{3}
3	(Romania) (Hungary)	Ana Bogdan; Panna Udvardy	6; 0	6; 2
4	(Romania) (Hungary)	Jaqueline Cristian; Dalma Gálfi				not played
5	(Romania) (Hungary)	Jaqueline Cristian / Monica Niculescu; Réka Luca Jani / Panna Udvardy	5; 7	6; 4	[10] [4]

=== Austria vs. Latvia ===
Austria
3
Multiversum, Schwechat, Austria
11–12 November 2022
Clay (i)

Latvia
2

			1	2	3
1	(Austria) (Latvia)	Tamira Paszek; Jeļena Ostapenko	6; 3	2; 6	6^{9} 7^{11}
2	(Austria) (Latvia)	Sinja Kraus; Daniela Vismane	6; 3	6; 1
3	(Austria) (Latvia)	Sinja Kraus; Jeļena Ostapenko	0; 6	6; 3	1; 6
4	(Austria) (Latvia)	Tamira Paszek; Diāna Marcinkēviča	6; 2	6; 3
5	(Austria) (Latvia)	Melanie Klaffner / Sinja Kraus; Diāna Marcinkēviča / Jeļena Ostapenko	7; 5	6; 3

=== Japan vs. Ukraine ===
Japan
1
Ariake Coliseum, Tokyo, Japan
11–12 November 2022
Hard (i)

Ukraine
3

			1	2	3
1	(Japan) (Ukraine)	Misaki Doi; Marta Kostyuk	6^{1} 7^{7}	4; 6
2	(Japan) (Ukraine)	Moyuka Uchijima; Katarina Zavatska	6^{3} 7^{7}	2; 6
3	(Japan) (Ukraine)	Moyuka Uchijima; Marta Kostyuk	0; 6	3; 6
4	(Japan) (Ukraine)	Misaki Doi; Katarina Zavatska				not played
5	(Japan) (Ukraine)	Shuko Aoyama / Ena Shibahara; Lyudmyla Kichenok / Katarina Zavatska	6; 2	6; 3

=== Argentina vs. Brazil ===
Argentina
1
Lawn Tennis Club, Tucumán, Argentina
11–12 November 2022
Clay

Brazil
3

			1	2	3
1	(Argentina) (Brazil)	Nadia Podoroska; Beatriz Haddad Maia	1; 6	3; 6
2	(Argentina) (Brazil)	Paula Ormaechea; Laura Pigossi	6; 2	7; 5
3	(Argentina) (Brazil)	María Lourdes Carlé; Beatriz Haddad Maia	3; 6	3; 6
4	(Argentina) (Brazil)	Solana Sierra; Laura Pigossi	2; 6	0; 6
5	(Argentina) (Brazil)	María Lourdes Carlé / Julia Riera; Beatriz Haddad Maia / Luisa Stefani				not played

=== Slovenia vs. China ===
Slovenia
3
Bela Dvorana, Velenje, Slovenia
11–12 November 2022
Clay (i)

China
1

			1	2	3
1	(Slovenia) (China)	Nina Potočnik; Zheng Qinwen	6^{1} 7^{7}	2; 6
2	(Slovenia) (China)	Kaja Juvan; Wang Xinyu	6; 3	6; 1
3	(Slovenia) (China)	Kaja Juvan; Zheng Qinwen	2; 6	7^{8} 6^{6}	6; 3
4	(Slovenia) (China)	Nina Potočnik; Wang Xiyu	6; 3	6; 2
5	(Slovenia) (China)	Kaja Juvan / Nina Potočnik; Wang Xiyu / Yuan Yue				not played

=== Mexico vs. Serbia ===
Mexico
4
Club Deportivo Potosino, San Luis Potosí, Mexico
11–12 November 2022
Clay

Serbia
0

			1	2	3
1	(Mexico) (Serbia)	Renata Zarazúa; Olga Danilović	7^{10} 6^{8}	6; 4
2	(Mexico) (Serbia)	Marcela Zacarías; Lola Radivojević	5; 7	6; 3	6; 2
3	(Mexico) (Serbia)	Marcela Zacarías; Natalija Stevanović	6; 0	6; 4
4	(Mexico) (Serbia)	Renata Zarazúa; Lola Radivojević				not played
5	(Mexico) (Serbia)	Giuliana Olmos / Renata Zarazúa; Katarina Jokić / Katarina Kozarov	6; 4	6; 1
