= Gabriela Rivera =

Guatemalan tennis player

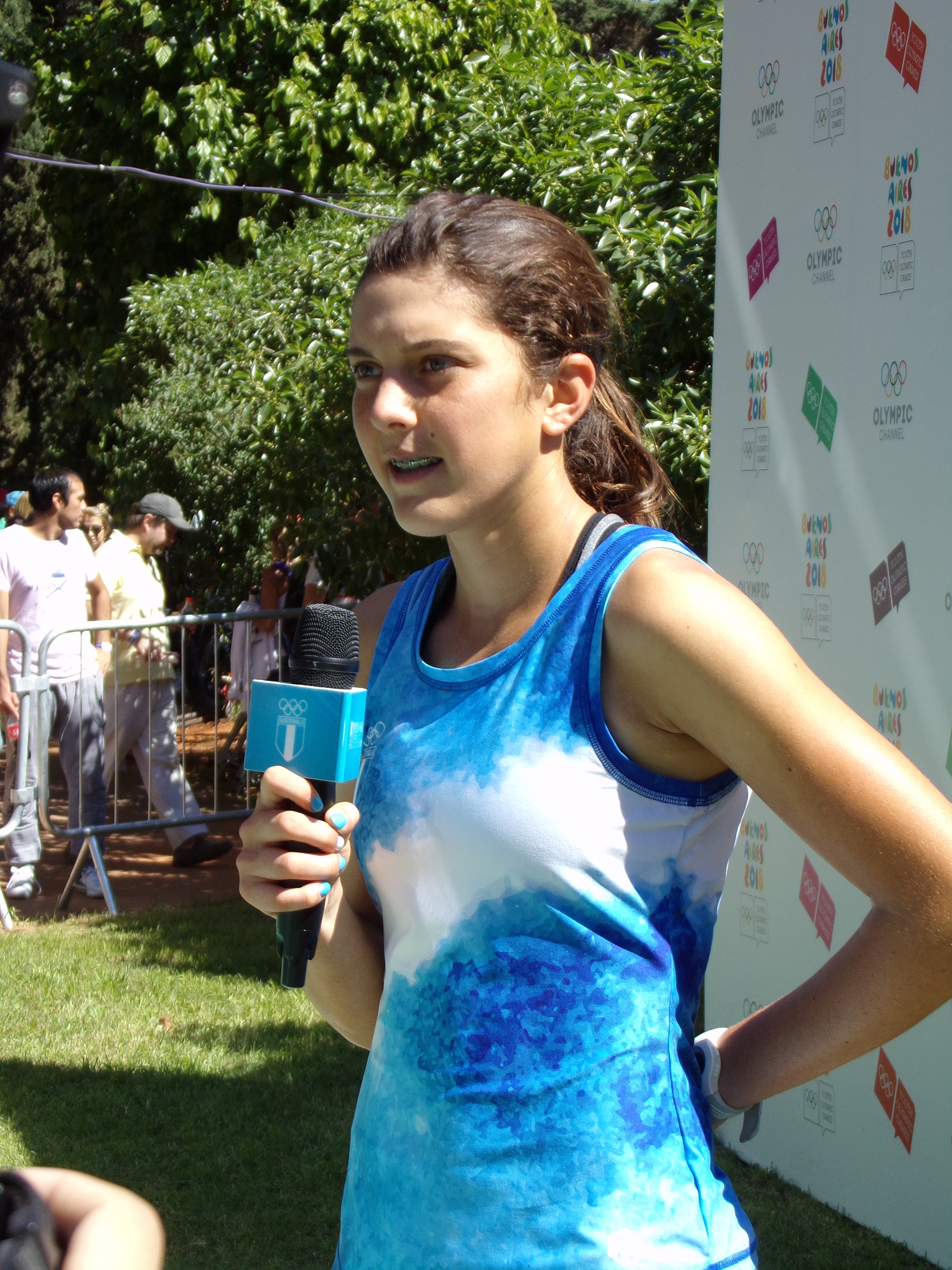
- Rivera at the 2018 Summer Youth Olympics
- Full name: María Gabriela Rivera Corado
- Country (sports): Guatemala
- Born: 22 December 2001 (age 24)
- Plays: Right-handed (two-handed backhand)
- Prize money: $11,716

Singles
- Career record: 2–1
- Career titles: 0

Doubles
- Career record: 0–1

Team competitions
- Fed Cup: 1–2
- Last updated on: 16 April 2019.

María Gabriela Rivera Corado (Note: In this Spanish name, the first or paternal surname is Rivera and the second or maternal family name is Corado.) (born 22 December 2001), known as Gabriela Rivera, is a Guatemalan tennis player.

On the juniors tour, Rivera has a career high ITF junior combined ranking of 35, achieved on 26 February 2018.

As of October 2021, she was ranked n. 1383 in the world by the WTA. Her highest WTA ranking was 690 on 2023.

Rivera represents Guatemala in the Fed Cup.

== ITF Finals ==
=== Singles: 1 title ===
Result	W-L	Date	Tournament	Tier	Surface	Opponent	Score
Win	1-0	Sep 2022	Cancun	15,000	Hard	(United States) Salma Ewing	4-3 ret.
