= 2019 Fed Cup Americas Zone =

Subsection of tennis competition

The Americas Zone is one of three zones of regional competition in the 2019 Fed Cup.

== Group I ==
- Venue: Club Campestre Sede Llanogrande, Medellín, Colombia (clay)
- Date: 6–9 February

The eight teams were divided into two pools of four teams. The two pool winners took part in a play-off to determine the nation advancing to the World Group II play-offs. The two nations finishing last and second last in their pools took part in relegation play-offs, with the two losing nations being relegated to Group II for 2020.

=== Seeding ===
Pot	Nation	Rank^{1}	Seed
1	Paraguay	19	1
1	Argentina	23	2
2	Brazil	25	3
2	Mexico	33	4
3	Colombia	35	5
3	Chile	38	6
4	Ecuador	39	7
4	Puerto Rico	52	8

- ^{1}Fed Cup Rankings as of 12 November 2018

=== Pools ===
	Pool A	PAR	MEX	COL	ECU
1	Paraguay (2–1)		2–1	1–2	3–0
2	Mexico (2–1)	1–2		2–1	3–0
3	Colombia (2–1)	2–1	1–2		2–1
4	Ecuador (0–3)	0–3	0–3	1–2	

	Pool B	BRA	CHI	ARG	PUR
1	Brazil (3–0)		3–0	2–1	2–1
2	Chile (2–1)	0–3		3–0	3–0
3	Argentina (1–2)	1–2	0–3		2–1
4	Puerto Rico (0–3)	1–2	0–3	1–2	

=== Play-offs ===
Placing	A Team	Score	B Team
Promotional	Paraguay	0–2	Brazil
3rd–4th	Mexico	1–2	Chile
Relegation	Colombia	2–1	Puerto Rico
Relegation	Ecuador	1–2	Argentina

=== Final placements ===
Placing	Teams	
Promoted/First	Brazil	
Second	Paraguay	
Third	Chile	
Fourth	Mexico	
Fifth	Colombia	Argentina
Relegated/Sixth	Puerto Rico	Ecuador

- Brazil was promoted to the 2019 Fed Cup World Group II Play-offs.
- Puerto Rico and Ecuador were relegated to Americas Zone Group II in 2020.

== Group II ==
- Venue 1: Tennis Club Las Terrazas Miraflores, Lima, Peru (clay)
- Venue 2: Centro Nacional de Tenis, Santo Domingo, Dominican Republic (hard)
- Dates: 16–20 April

The twelve teams will compete across two different venues, with 6 nations taking part in Lima, and 5 nations taking part in Santo Domingo. In Lima, the six teams will be divided into two pools of 3 teams. The winners of each pool will play-off to determine the nation advancing to Group I in 2020. In Santo Domingo, five nations will compete in one pool, with the winning nation promoted to Group I in 2020.

=== Seeding ===
Pot	Nation	Rank^{1}	Seed
1	Peru	48	1
1	Venezuela	52	2
2	Guatemala	55	3
2	~~Costa Rica~~	~~59~~	~~4~~
3	Cuba	61	5
3	Bahamas	62	6
4	Bolivia	68	7
4	Dominican Republic	70	8
5	Trinidad and Tobago	72	9
5	Uruguay	84	10
6	Barbados	96	11
6	Panama	99	12

- ^{1}Fed Cup Rankings as of 11 February 2019

=== Pools ===
	Pool A (Lima)	PER	BOL	PAN
1	Peru (2–0)		2–1	3–0
2	Bolivia (1–1)	1–2		3–0
3	Panama (0–2)	0–3	0–3	

	Pool B (Lima)	BAH	TTO	BAR
1	Bahamas (2–0)		2–1	3–0
2	Trinidad and Tobago (1–1)	1–2		3–0
3	Barbados (0–2)	0–3	0–3	

	Pool A (Santo Domingo)	VEN	GUA	URU	DOM	CUB
1	Venezuela (4–0)		2–1	3–0	3–0	3–0
2	Guatemala (3–1)	1–2		3–0	3–0	3–0
3	Uruguay (2–2)	0–3	0–3		2–1	2–1
4	Dominican Republic (1–3)	0–3	0–3	1–2		2–0
5	Cuba (0–4)	0–3	0–3	1–2	0–2	

=== Play-offs ===
Placing (Lima)	A Team	Score	B Team
Promotional	Peru	2–0	Bahamas
3rd–4th	Bolivia	2–0	Trinidad and Tobago
5th–6th	Panama	0–3	Barbados

=== Final placements ===
Placing	Teams	
Promoted/First	Peru	Venezuela
Second	Bahamas	Guatemala
Third	Bolivia	Uruguay
Fourth	Trinidad and Tobago	Dominican Republic
Fifth	Panama	Cuba
Sixth	Barbados	

- Peru and Venezuela were promoted to Americas Zone Group I in 2020.
