= Santo Domingo Este =

- Municipality
- Municipality of Santo Domingo Este
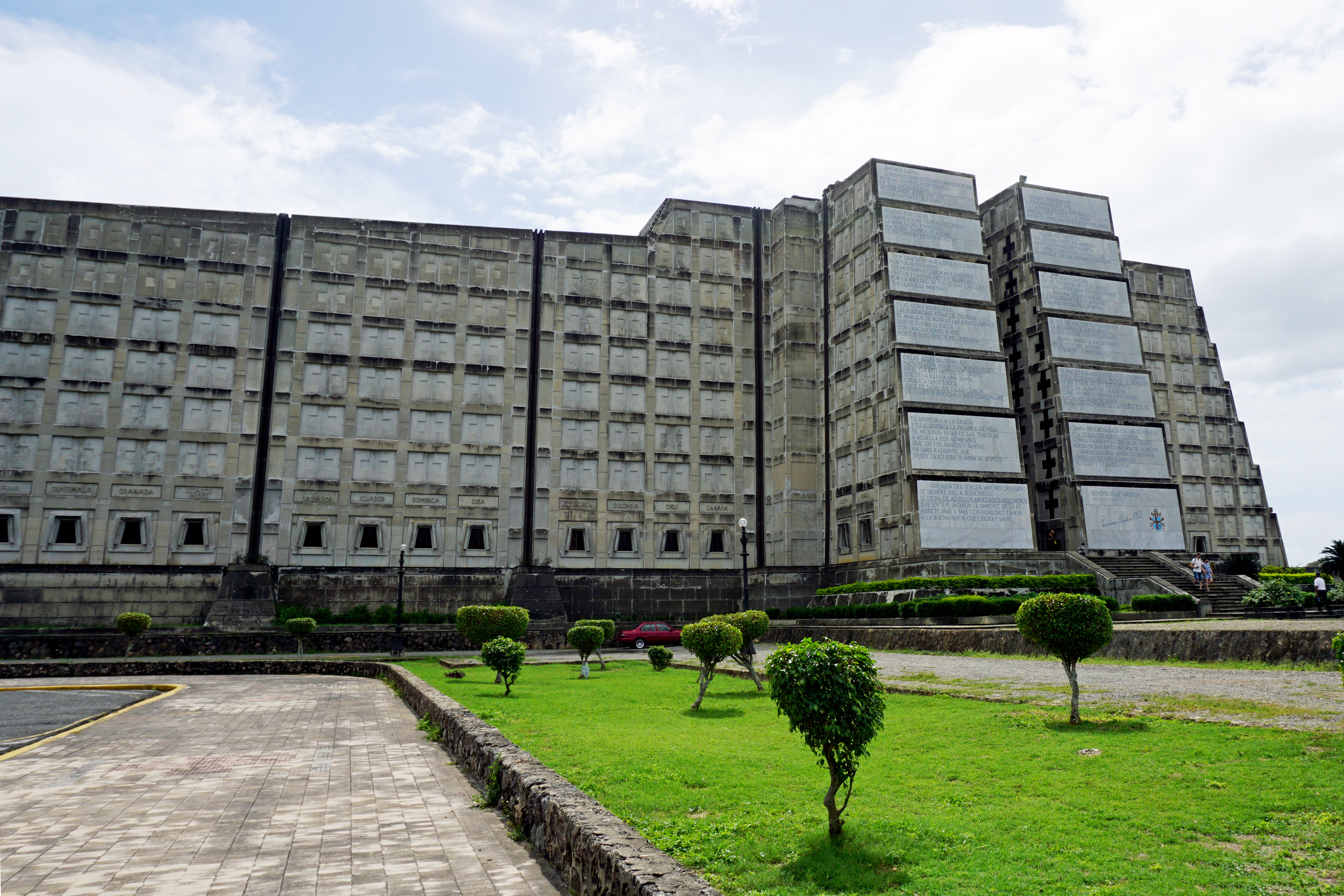
- View of Faro a Colón monument which splits the Distrito Nacional and Santo Domingo Este

- Flag

- Santo Domingo Este in the Dominican Republic
- Coordinates: 18°29′7.79″N 69°52′24.26″W
- Country: Dominican Republic
- Province: Santo Domingo
- Municipality since: 2001

Government
  - Mayor: Dío Astacio (PRM)

Area
  - Total: 106.29 km^{2} (41.04 sq mi)

Population (2022 census)
  - Total: 1,029,117
  - Density: 9,682.2/km^{2} (25,077/sq mi)
- Municipal Districts: 1
- Website: ayuntamientosde.gob.do (in Spanish)

Santo Domingo Este is a municipality and the provincial capital of the Santo Domingo province in the Dominican Republic. It has one municipal district (distrito municipal), San Luis.

Santo Domingo Este is across the Ozama River which divides the east and west sections of metropolitan Santo Domingo. This eastern side is more residential and less commercially developed, but it too has experienced growth, though at a slower pace than Santo Domingo itself, with new malls and department stores.

== History ==
Santo Domingo Este was created as a separate municipality in 2001 by Law 163-01, which split the Santo Domingo province from the Distrito Nacional.

Plans for local government separate from the National District were first floated in the 1970s. Congress considered a bill in 1984 that would have created the province of Santo Domingo Oriental, which was rejected on grounds that the creation of a new province would be unconstitutional.

== Culture ==
Santo Domingo Este has a variety of shopping centers, some of them among the largest in the country, such as Mega Centro and Coral Mall. There are also commercial districts in the Venezuela Avenue and St. Vincent de Paul areas, which feature active nightlife and restaurants.

The municipality also includes the Villa Panamericana, a housing complex built for the athletes of the 2003 Pan American Games.

== Economy ==
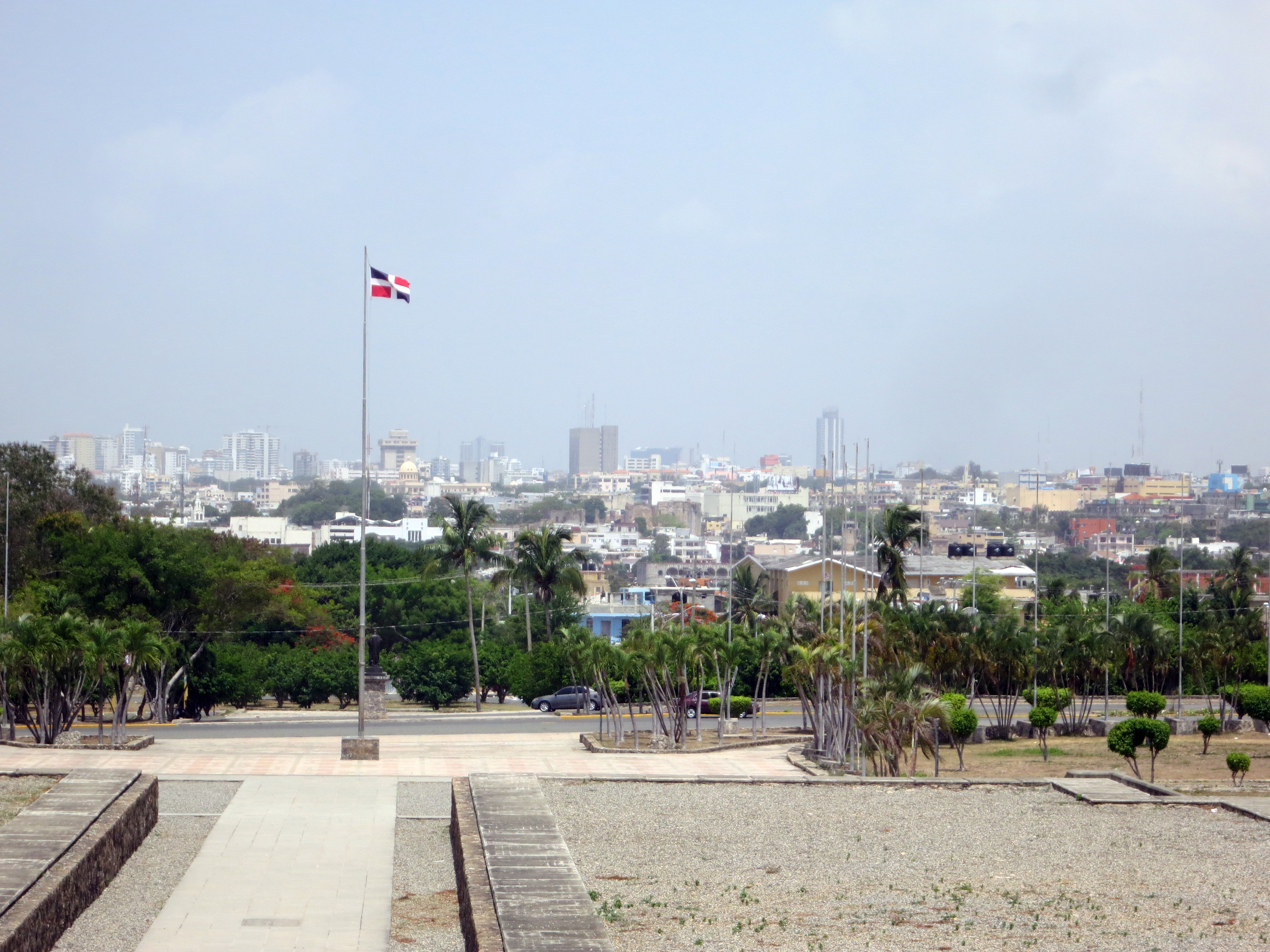
Santo Domingo Este

Santo Domingo Este has three duty-free zones. Hainamosa is home to 11 businesses and 3,000 employees; San Isidro houses 26 businesses and 7,470 employees; and Los Mina has just one business and 6,000 employees. The New Isabela Industrial Park is also located in the municipality.

Companies with a presence in the area include Barceló, Manufacturera Sociedad Industrial, Lácteos Dominicanos, Parmalat, Telever, Codetel, Tricom, as well as construction, energy, and agricultural businesses.

== Sectors ==
When the city was created, these sectors were also divided:

- Alma Rosa I
- Alma Rosa II
- Ana Teresa Balaguer
- Arismar
- Barrio Ámbar
- Barrio La Isla
- Brisas del Este
- Brisas del Edén
- Cansino Adentro
- Corales del Este
- El Almirante
- El Brisal
- El Paredón
- El Rosal
- Ensanche Isabelita
- Hainamosa
- Invimosa
- Invivienda
- Jardínes de Alma Rosa
- Las Américas
- Los Coquitos
- Los Farallones
- Los Frailes I
- Los Frailes II
- Los Mameyes
- Los Minas
- Los Minas Sur
- Los Molinos
- Los Tres Ojos
- Los Trinitarios
- Lotificación del Este
- Lucerna
- Maquitería
- Matías Ramón Mella
- Mendoza
- Milagrosa
- Mirador del Este
- Ozama
- Paraíso Oriental
- Ralma
- Reparto Alma Rosa
- Residencial del Este
- Residencial Don Oscar
- Residencial Doña Hilaria
- Residencial Tito IV
- San Isidro
- San Luis
- Sans Souci
- Tropical del Este
- Urbanización Italia
- Urbanización San Cirilo
- Urbanizacion Mi Hogar
- Valle del Este
- Villa Carmen
- Villa Cumbre
- Villa Duarte
- Villa Eloisa
- Villa Olímpica
- Villa Faro
- Vista Hermosa

== Tourist attractions ==
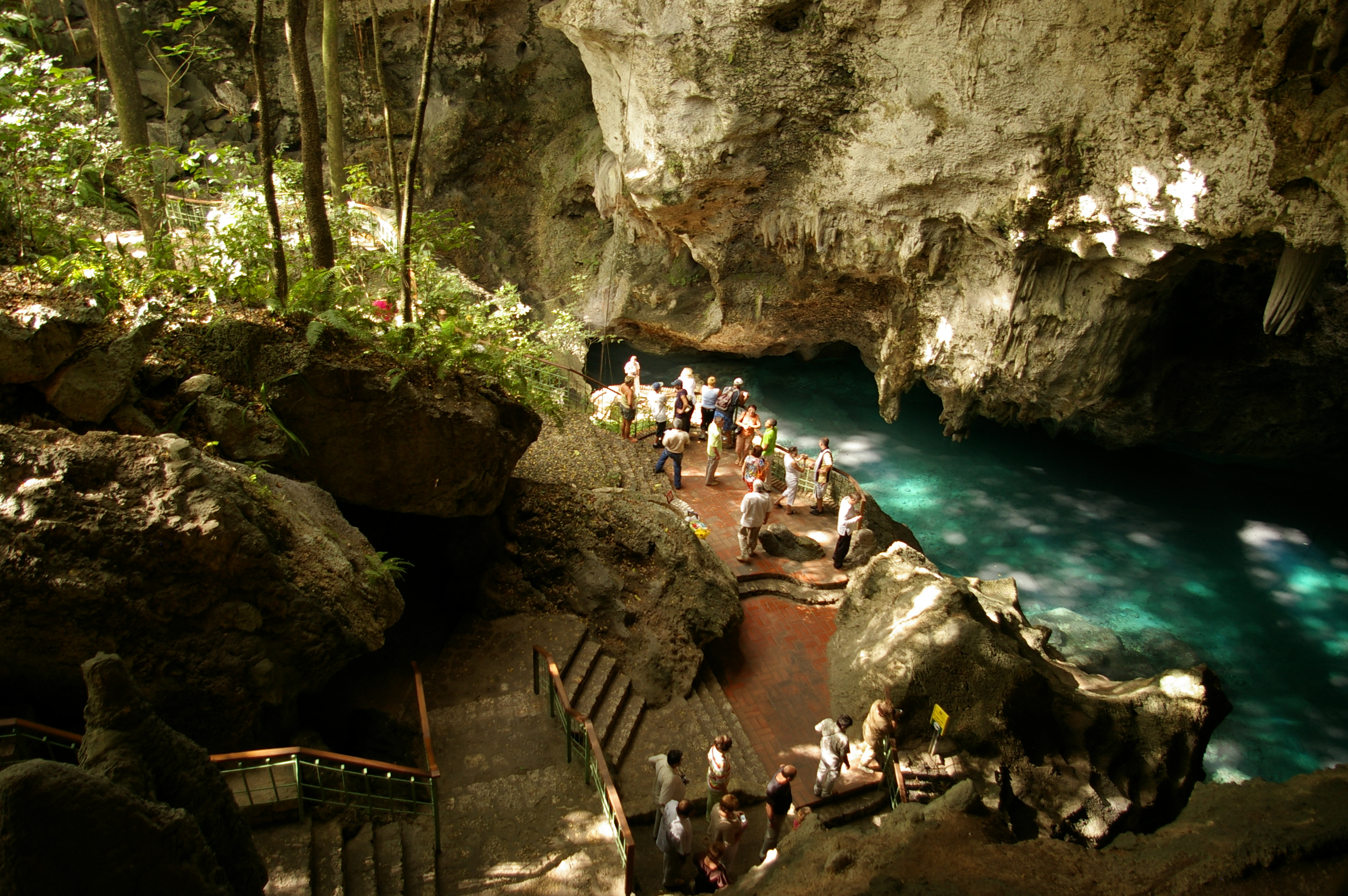
Los Tres Ojos national park

- Faro a Colón
- Parque Mirador Este
- Acuario
- Los Tres Ojos
- Hipódromo V Centenario
- Agua Splash
