= 1999 Fed Cup Americas Zone Group II – Knockout Stage =

The Knockout Stage of the 1999 Fed Cup Americas Zone Group II was the final stage of the Zonal Competition involving teams from the Americas. Those that qualified for this stage placed first and second in their respective pools.

Placing	Pool A	Pool B	Pool C	Pool D
1	Uruguay	Cuba	Bolivia	Peru
2	Dominican Republic	Bahamas	Barbados	Jamaica
3	Costa Rica	El Salvador	Trinidad and Tobago	Bermuda
4	Guatemala	Haiti	Panama	Antigua and Barbuda

The eight teams were then randomly drawn into two two-stage knockout tournaments, with the winners advancing to next year's Americas Zone Group I.

Semifinals
Uruguay	3
Bahamas	0
Jamaica	0
Bolivia	3
Cuba	3
Barbados	0
Dominican Republic	0
Peru	3

Finals
Uruguay	2
Bolivia	1
Cuba	2
Peru	1

== Semifinals ==
=== Uruguay vs. Bahamas ===
Uruguay
3
Costa Rica Country Club, San José, Costa Rica
26 February 1999
Hard (outdoors)

Bahamas
0

			1	2	3
1	(Uruguay) (The Bahamas)	Cecilia Guillenea; Nikkita Fountain	6; 4	6; 1
2	(Uruguay) (The Bahamas)	Daniela Olivera; Kim Cartwright	7; 5	6; 0
3	(Uruguay) (The Bahamas)	Cecilia Guillenea / Daniela Peyrot; Nikkita Fountain / Jodi Saunders	6; 2	6; 1

=== Jamaica vs. Bolivia ===
Jamaica
0
Costa Rica Country Club, San José, Costa Rica
26 February 1999
Hard (outdoors)

Bolivia
3

			1	2	3
1	(Jamaica) (Bolivia)	Alexandra Chong; Viviana Rivero	1; 6	3; 6
2	(Jamaica) (Bolivia)	Amira Samara; Mónica Poveda	1; 6	2; 6
3	(Jamaica) (Bolivia)	Alexandra Chong / Amira Samara; Eunice Paravicini / Mónica Poveda	4; 6	6; 1	2; 6

=== Cuba vs. Barbados ===
Cuba
3
Costa Rica Country Club, San José, Costa Rica
26 February 1999
Hard (outdoors)

Barbados
0

			1	2	3
1	(Cuba) (Barbados)	Yamile Fors Guerra; Tricia-Ann Greaves	6; 1	6; 1
2	(Cuba) (Barbados)	Yoannis Montesino; Richele Le Saldo	6; 1	6; 3
3	(Cuba) (Barbados)	Yamile Cordova / Yoannis Montesino; Tricia-Ann Greaves / Richele Le Saldo	6; 1	6; 3

=== Dominican Republic vs. Peru ===
Dominican Republic
0
Costa Rica Country Club, San José, Costa Rica
26 February 1999
Hard (outdoors)

Peru
3

			1	2	3
1	(Dominican Republic) (Peru)	Carla Prieto; Lorena Rodríguez di Laura	3; 6	4; 6
2	(Dominican Republic) (Peru)	Glenny Cepeda; Carla Rodríguez	0; 6	7^{7} 6^{4}	4; 6
3	(Dominican Republic) (Peru)	Kristel Izquierdo / Carla Prieto; Lorena Rodríguez di Laura / Ariana Rojas	3; 6	2; 6

== Finals ==
=== Uruguay vs. Bolivia ===
Uruguay
2
Costa Rica Country Club, San José, Costa Rica
27 February 1999
Hard (outdoors)

Bolivia
1

			1	2	3
1	(Uruguay) (Bolivia)	Cecilia Guillenea; Daniela Álvarez	6; 3	3; 6	6; 4
2	(Uruguay) (Bolivia)	Daniela Olivera; Mónica Poveda	6; 2	2; 6	1; 6
3	(Uruguay) (Bolivia)	Daniela Olivera / Virginia Sadi; Daniela Álvarez / Mónica Poveda	6; 2	6; 2

- Uruguay advanced to Group I for 2000, where they placed fourth in their pool of five.

=== Cuba vs. Peru ===
Cuba
2
Costa Rica Country Club, San José, Costa Rica
27 February 1999
Hard (outdoors)

Peru
1

			1	2	3
1	(Cuba) (Peru)	Yamile Fors Guerra; Ariana Rojas	6; 2	2; 6	6; 4
2	(Cuba) (Peru)	Yoannis Montesino; Carla Rodríguez	6; 2	5; 7	2; 6
3	(Cuba) (Peru)	Yamile Cordova / Yoannis Montesino; Carla Rodríguez / Lorena Rodríguez di Laura	3; 6	6; 3	7; 5

- Cuba advanced to Group I for 2000, where they placed last in their pool of five and was thus relegated back to Group II for 2001.

== See also ==
- Fed Cup structure
