= 1997 Fed Cup Americas Zone Group II – Pool B =

International tennis competition

Group B was one of two pools in the Americas Zone Group II of the 1997 Fed Cup. Seven teams competed in a round robin competition, with the top team advancing to Group I in 1998.

	(Uruguay) URU	(Cuba) CUB	(Jamaica) JAM	(Bolivia) BOL	(Costa Rica) CRC	(El Salvador) ESA	(Bermuda) BER	(Antigua and Barbuda) ATG	Match; W–L	Set; W–L	Game; W–L	Standings
Uruguay		2–1	3–0	2–1	3–0	3–0	3–0	3–0	7–0	40–5	269–110	1
Cuba	1–2		2–1	2–1	3–0	3–0	3–0	3–0	6–1	36–11	256–151	2
Jamaica	0–3	1–2		2–1	3–0	3–0	3–0	3–0	5–2	32–17	250–186	3
Bolivia	1–2	1–2	1–2		2–1	2–1	3–0	3–0	4–3	28–20	218–184	4
Costa Rica	0–3	0–3	0–3	1–2		2–1	3–0	3–0	3–4	19–26	191–192	5
El Salvador	0–3	0–3	0–3	1–2	1–2		3–0	3–0	2–5	20–27	188–215	6
Bermuda	0–3	0–3	0–3	0–3	0–3	0–3		3–0	1–6	9–36	104–234	7
Antigua and Barbuda	0–3	0–3	0–3	1–2	0–3	0–3	0–3		0–7	0–42	35–252	8

== Uruguay vs. Jamaica ==
Uruguay
3
Casa de Campo, Santo Domingo, Dominican Republic
12 May 1997
Har-Tru clay (outdoors)

Jamaica
0

			1	2	3
1	(Uruguay) (Jamaica)	Nannette Duxin; Camille Walter	6; 4	6; 4
2	(Uruguay) (Jamaica)	Elena Juricich; Sasha Hanna	6; 0	6; 1
3	(Uruguay) (Jamaica)	Nannette Duxin / Elena Juricich; Amira Samara / Camille Walter	6; 2	6; 3

== Cuba vs. Bermuda ==
Cuba
3
Casa de Campo, Santo Domingo, Dominican Republic
12 May 1997
Har-Tru clay (outdoors)

Bermuda
0

			1	2	3
1	(Cuba) (Bermuda)	Yamile Fors Guerra; Kim Simmons	6; 2	6; 3
2	(Cuba) (Bermuda)	Yoannis Montesino; Debra Darrell	6; 0	6; 0
3	(Cuba) (Bermuda)	Yamile Fors Guerra / Yoannis Montesino; Kelly Holland / Danielle Paynter	6; 1	6; 1

== Bolivia vs. Costa Rica ==
Bolivia
2
Casa de Campo, Santo Domingo, Dominican Republic
12 May 1997
Har-Tru clay (outdoors)

Costa Rica
1

			1	2	3
1	(Bolivia) (Costa Rica)	Mónica Poveda; Melissa Golfin	7; 5	6; 1
2	(Bolivia) (Costa Rica)	Carla Jiménez; Paula Umaña	3; 6	3; 6
3	(Bolivia) (Costa Rica)	María Alejandra Claure / Mónica Poveda; Milena Leiva / Paula Umaña	6; 3	6; 2

== El Salvador vs. Antigua and Barbuda ==
El Salvador
3
Casa de Campo, Santo Domingo, Dominican Republic
12 May 1997
Har-Tru clay (outdoors)

Antigua and Barbuda
0

			1	2	3
1	(El Salvador) (Antigua and Barbuda)	Caroline Monlins; Niki Williams	6; 1	6; 3
2	(El Salvador) (Antigua and Barbuda)	Annette Falkenberg; Wendy Brown	6; 1	6; 2
3	(El Salvador) (Antigua and Barbuda)	Annette Falkenberg / Caroline Monlins; Francine Harvey / Niki Williams	6; 2	6; 0

== Uruguay vs. Antigua and Barbuda ==
Uruguay
3
Casa de Campo, Santo Domingo, Dominican Republic
13 May 1997
Har-Tru clay (outdoors)

Antigua and Barbuda
0

			1	2	3
1	(Uruguay) (Antigua and Barbuda)	Daniela Olivera; Niki Williams	6; 0	6; 0
2	(Uruguay) (Antigua and Barbuda)	Elena Juricich; Wendy Brown	6; 0	6; 0
3	(Uruguay) (Antigua and Barbuda)	Nannette Duxin / Daniela Olivera; Wendy Brown / Francine Harvey	6; 2	6; 1

== Cuba vs. El Salvador ==
Cuba
3
Casa de Campo, Santo Domingo, Dominican Republic
13 May 1997
Har-Tru clay (outdoors)

El Salvador
0

			1	2	3
1	(Cuba) (El Salvador)	Yamile Fors Guerra; Annette Falkenberg	6; 3	6; 4
2	(Cuba) (El Salvador)	Yoannis Montesino; Ingrid González	6; 2	6; 1
3	(Cuba) (El Salvador)	Yamile Cordova / Yoannis Montesino; Annette Falkenberg / Caroline Monlins	6; 3	7; 5

== Jamaica vs. Costa Rica ==
Jamaica
3
Casa de Campo, Santo Domingo, Dominican Republic
13 May 1997
Har-Tru clay (outdoors)

Costa Rica
0

			1	2	3
1	(Jamaica) (Costa Rica)	Amira Samara; Melissa Golfin	7^{7} 6^{5}	6; 2
2	(Jamaica) (Costa Rica)	Sasha Hanna; Paula Umaña	6; 2	5; 7	6; 2
3	(Jamaica) (Costa Rica)	Kadija Richards / Camille Walter; Paola Almeida / Milena Leiva	7^{9} 6^{7}	6; 3

== Bolivia vs. Bermuda ==
Bolivia
3
Casa de Campo, Santo Domingo, Dominican Republic
13 May 1997
Har-Tru clay (outdoors)

Bermuda
0

			1	2	3
1	(Bolivia) (Bermuda)	María Alejandra Claure; Danielle Paynter	6; 1	7^{7} 6^{3}
2	(Bolivia) (Bermuda)	Carla Jiménez; Debra Darrell	6; 2	6; 1
3	(Bolivia) (Bermuda)	María Alejandra Claure / Mónica Poveda; Kelly Holland / Kim Simmons	6; 2	6; 0

== Uruguay vs. Costa Rica ==
Uruguay
3
Casa de Campo, Santo Domingo, Dominican Republic
14 May 1997
Har-Tru clay (outdoors)

Costa Rica
0

			1	2	3
1	(Uruguay) (Costa Rica)	Nannette Duxin; Melissa Golfin	6; 1	6; 2
2	(Uruguay) (Costa Rica)	Elena Juricich; Paula Umaña	6; 4	6; 3
3	(Uruguay) (Costa Rica)	Cecilia Guillenea / Daniela Olivera; Milena Leiva / Paula Umaña	6; 2	6; 1

== Cuba vs. Antigua and Barbuda ==
Cuba
3
Casa de Campo, Santo Domingo, Dominican Republic
14 May 1997
Har-Tru clay (outdoors)

Antigua and Barbuda
0

			1	2	3
1	(Cuba) (Antigua and Barbuda)	Yamile Cordova; Niki Williams	6; 0	6; 0
2	(Cuba) (Antigua and Barbuda)	Yoannis Montesino; Wendy Brown	6; 1	6; 0
3	(Cuba) (Antigua and Barbuda)	Yamile Cordova / Yoannis Montesino; Wendy Brown / Niki Williams	6; 3	6; 0

== Jamaica vs. Bermuda ==
Jamaica
3
Casa de Campo, Santo Domingo, Dominican Republic
14 May 1997
Har-Tru clay (outdoors)

Bermuda
0

			1	2	3
1	(Jamaica) (Bermuda)	Amira Samara; Kim Simmons	6; 3	6; 0
2	(Jamaica) (Bermuda)	Kadija Richards; Debra Darrell	2; 6	6; 0	6; 1
3	(Jamaica) (Bermuda)	Sasha Hanna / Camille Walter; Kelly Holland / Danielle Paynter	6; 2	6; 1

== Bolivia vs. El Salvador ==
Bolivia
2
Casa de Campo, Santo Domingo, Dominican Republic
14 May 1997
Har-Tru clay (outdoors)

El Salvador
1

			1	2	3
1	(Bolivia) (El Salvador)	Mónica Poveda; Annette Falkenberg	2; 6	6; 2	6; 1
2	(Bolivia) (El Salvador)	Carla Jiménez; Ingrid González	3; 6	2; 6
3	(Bolivia) (El Salvador)	María Alejandra Claure / Mónica Poveda; Annette Falkenberg / Caroline Monlins	6; 2	6; 4

== Uruguay vs. Cuba ==
Uruguay
2
Casa de Campo, Santo Domingo, Dominican Republic
15 May 1997
Har-Tru clay (outdoors)

Cuba
1

			1	2	3
1	(Uruguay) (Cuba)	Nannette Duxin; Yamile Fors Guerra	6^{5} 7^{7}	7; 5	6; 3
2	(Uruguay) (Cuba)	Elena Juricich; Yoannis Montesino	6; 4	6^{5} 7^{7}	2; 6
3	(Uruguay) (Cuba)	Nannette Duxin / Elena Juricich; Yamile Cordova / Yoannis Montesino	6; 1	7^{7} 6^{4}

== Jamaica vs. El Salvador ==
Jamaica
3
Casa de Campo, Santo Domingo, Dominican Republic
15 May 1997
Har-Tru clay (outdoors)

El Salvador
0

			1	2	3
1	(Jamaica) (El Salvador)	Kadija Richards; Annette Falkenberg	6; 4	1; 6	9; 7
2	(Jamaica) (El Salvador)	Sasha Hanna; Ingrid González	6; 3	2; 6	6; 1
3	(Jamaica) (El Salvador)	Amira Samara / Camille Walter; Ingrid González / Caroline Monlins	6; 3	6; 4

== Bolivia vs. Antigua and Barbuda ==
Bolivia
3
Casa de Campo, Santo Domingo, Dominican Republic
15 May 1997
Har-Tru clay (outdoors)

Antigua and Barbuda
0

			1	2	3
1	(Bolivia) (Antigua and Barbuda)	María Alejandra Claure; Niki Williams	6; 0	6; 0
2	(Bolivia) (Antigua and Barbuda)	Claudia Herbas; Wendy Brown	6; 1	6; 1
3	(Bolivia) (Antigua and Barbuda)	María Alejandra Claure / Claudia Herbas; Francine Harvey / Niki Williams	6; 0	6; 0

== Costa Rica vs. Bermuda ==
Costa Rica
3
Casa de Campo, Santo Domingo, Dominican Republic
15 May 1997
Har-Tru clay (outdoors)

Bermuda
0

			1	2	3
1	(Costa Rica) (Bermuda)	Melissa Golfin; Danielle Paynter	6; 0	6; 1
2	(Costa Rica) (Bermuda)	Paula Umaña; Kim Simmons	6; 1	6; 1
3	(Costa Rica) (Bermuda)	Paola Almeida / Milena Leiva; Kelly Holland / Kim Simmons	3; 6	6; 4	6; 2

== Uruguay vs. Bermuda ==
Uruguay
3
Casa de Campo, Santo Domingo, Dominican Republic
16 May 1997
Har-Tru clay (outdoors)

Bermuda
0

			1	2	3
1	(Uruguay) (Bermuda)	Nannette Duxin; Kelly Holland	6; 0	6; 0
2	(Uruguay) (Bermuda)	Elena Juricich; Debra Darrell	6; 1	6; 1
3	(Uruguay) (Bermuda)	Cecilia Guillenea / Daniela Olivera; Danielle Paynter / Kim Simmons	6; 1	6; 0

== Cuba vs. Bolivia ==
Cuba
2
Casa de Campo, Santo Domingo, Dominican Republic
16 May 1997
Har-Tru clay (outdoors)

Bolivia
1

			1	2	3
1	(Cuba) (Bolivia)	Yamile Fors Guerra; Claudia Herbas	6; 3	4; 6	6; 2
2	(Cuba) (Bolivia)	Yoannis Montesino; Mónica Poveda	6; 3	2; 6	0; 6
3	(Cuba) (Bolivia)	Yamile Cordova / Yoannis Montesino; María Alejandra Claure / Mónica Poveda	6; 0	6; 1

== Jamaica vs. Antigua and Barbuda ==
Jamaica
3
Casa de Campo, Santo Domingo, Dominican Republic
16 May 1997
Har-Tru clay (outdoors)

Antigua and Barbuda
0

			1	2	3
1	(Jamaica) (Antigua and Barbuda)	Camille Walter; Tara-Deen Moore	6; 0	6; 0
2	(Jamaica) (Antigua and Barbuda)	Sasha Hanna; Wendy Brown	6; 0	6; 1
3	(Jamaica) (Antigua and Barbuda)	Sasha Hanna / Amira Samara; Wendy Brown / Francine Harvey	6; 0	6; 2

== Costa Rica vs. El Salvador ==
Costa Rica
2
Casa de Campo, Santo Domingo, Dominican Republic
16 May 1997
Har-Tru clay (outdoors)

El Salvador
1

			1	2	3
1	(Costa Rica) (El Salvador)	Melissa Golfin; Annette Falkenberg	6; 3	6; 0
2	(Costa Rica) (El Salvador)	Paula Umaña; Ingrid González	4; 6	2; 6
3	(Costa Rica) (El Salvador)	Melissa Golfin / Paula Umaña; Annette Falkenberg / Ingrid González	5; 7	6; 1	6; 3

== Uruguay vs. Bolivia ==
Uruguay
2
Casa de Campo, Santo Domingo, Dominican Republic
17 May 1997
Har-Tru clay (outdoors)

Bolivia
1

			1	2	3
1	(Uruguay) (Bolivia)	Nannette Duxin; Claudia Herbas	6; 3	6^{9} 7^{11}	6; 8
2	(Uruguay) (Bolivia)	Elena Juricich; Mónica Poveda	6; 0	6; 3
3	(Uruguay) (Bolivia)	Cecilia Guillenea / Elena Juricich; Carla Jiménez / Mónica Poveda	7; 5	6; 1

== Cuba vs. Jamaica ==
Cuba
3
Casa de Campo, Santo Domingo, Dominican Republic
17 May 1997
Har-Tru clay (outdoors)

Jamaica
0

			1	2	3
1	(Cuba) (Jamaica)	Yamile Fors Guerra; Amira Samara	5; 7	5; 7
2	(Cuba) (Jamaica)	Yamile Cordova; Sasha Hanna	7^{7} 6^{2}	6; 2
3	(Cuba) (Jamaica)	Yamile Cordova / Yoannis Montesino; Sasha Hanna / Camille Walter	6; 3	1; 6	6; 2

== Costa Rica vs. Antigua and Barbuda ==
Costa Rica
3
Casa de Campo, Santo Domingo, Dominican Republic
17 May 1997
Har-Tru clay (outdoors)

Antigua and Barbuda
0

			1	2	3
1	(Costa Rica) (Antigua and Barbuda)	Paola Almeida; Niki Williams	6; 1	6; 1
2	(Costa Rica) (Antigua and Barbuda)	Melissa Golfin; Wendy Brown	6; 0	6; 0
3	(Costa Rica) (Antigua and Barbuda)	Paola Almeida / Milena Leiva; Francine Harvey / Niki Williams	6; 3	6; 0

== El Salvador vs. Bermuda ==
El Salvador
3
Casa de Campo, Santo Domingo, Dominican Republic
17 May 1997
Har-Tru clay (outdoors)

Bermuda
0

			1	2	3
1	(El Salvador) (Bermuda)	Annette Falkenberg; Kim Simmons	3; 6	6; 3	6; 0
2	(El Salvador) (Bermuda)	Ingrid González; Debra Darrell	6; 2	6; 2
3	(El Salvador) (Bermuda)	Ingrid González / Caroline Monlins; Debra Darrell / Kelly Holland	6; 3	6; 2

== Uruguay vs. El Salvador ==
Uruguay
3
Casa de Campo, Santo Domingo, Dominican Republic
18 May 1997
Har-Tru clay (outdoors)

El Salvador
0

			1	2	3
1	(Uruguay) (El Salvador)	Daniela Olivera; Annette Falkenberg	6; 3	6; 0
2	(Uruguay) (El Salvador)	Elena Juricich; Ingrid González	6; 1	6; 1
3	(Uruguay) (El Salvador)	Elena Juricich / Daniela Olivera; Annette Falkenberg / Caroline Monlins	6; 0	7^{7} 6^{5}

== Cuba vs. Costa Rica ==
Cuba
3
Casa de Campo, Santo Domingo, Dominican Republic
18 May 1997
Har-Tru clay (outdoors)

Costa Rica
0

			1	2	3
1	(Cuba) (Costa Rica)	Yamile Fors Guerra; Milena Leiva	6; 4	6; 2
2	(Cuba) (Costa Rica)	Yamile Cordova; Paula Umaña	6; 4	6; 4
3	(Cuba) (Costa Rica)	Yamile Fors Guerra / Yoannis Montesino; Melissa Golfin / Paula Umaña	6; 2	6; 1

== Jamaica vs. Bolivia ==
Jamaica
2
Casa de Campo, Santo Domingo, Dominican Republic
18 May 1997
Har-Tru clay (outdoors)

Bolivia
1

			1	2	3
1	(Jamaica) (Bolivia)	Kadija Richards; Claudia Herbas	2; 6	6; 0	6; 2
2	(Jamaica) (Bolivia)	Sasha Hanna; Mónica Poveda	6; 4	6; 2
3	(Jamaica) (Bolivia)	Sasha Hanna / Camille Walter; María Alejandra Claure / Mónica Poveda	6; 2	6^{8} 7^{10}	4; 6

== Bermuda vs. Antigua and Barbuda ==
Bermuda
3
Casa de Campo, Santo Domingo, Dominican Republic
18 May 1997
Har-Tru clay (outdoors)

Antigua and Barbuda
0

			1	2	3
1	(Bermuda) (Antigua and Barbuda)	Debra Darrell; Niki Williams	6; 3	6; 0
2	(Bermuda) (Antigua and Barbuda)	Kim Simmons; Francine Harvey	6; 4	6; 0
3	(Bermuda) (Antigua and Barbuda)	Debra Darrell / Kelly Holland; Francine Harvey / Niki Williams	6; 1	6; 1

- Uruguay placed first in the pool, and thus advanced to Group I in 1998. However, they placed eighth overall were thus relegated back to Group II for 1999.

== See also ==
- Fed Cup structure
