= 1998 Fed Cup Americas Zone Group II – Pool B =

International tennis competition

For tennis tournaments, Group B was one of two pools in the Americas Zone Group II of the 1998 Fed Cup. Eight teams competed in a round robin competition, with the top team advancing to Group I in 1999.

	(Puerto Rico) PUR	(Cuba) CUB	(Dominican Republic) DOM	(Trinidad and Tobago) TRI	(Panama) PAN	(Bolivia) BOL	(Jamaica) JAM	(The Bahamas) BAH	Match; W–L	Set; W–L	Game; W–L	Standings
Puerto Rico		2–1	2–1	3–0	2–1	3–0	3–0	3–0	7–0	32–10	256–139	1
Cuba	1–2		2–1	3–0	3–0	3–0	3–0	3–0	6–1	37–7	208–109	2
Dominican Republic	1–2	1–2		2–1	2–1	2–1	3–0	2–1	5–2	25–22	213–189	3
Trinidad and Tobago	0–3	0–3	1–2		2–1	2–1	2–1	3–0	4–3	21–24	182–191	4
Panama	1–2	0–3	1–2	1–2		2–1	3–0	2–1	3–4	21–26	178–217	5
Bolivia	0–3	0–3	1–2	1–2	1–2		2–1	1–2	1–6	18–29	169–240	6
Jamaica	0–3	0–3	0–3	1–2	0–3	1–2		3–0	1–6	13–32	159–211	7
Bahamas	0–3	0–3	1–2	0–3	1–2	2–1	0–3		1–6	11–35	142–241	8

== Puerto Rico vs. Jamaica ==
Puerto Rico
3
Chipinque Racquet Club, Monterrey, Mexico
27 April 1998
Hard (outdoors)

Jamaica
0

			1	2	3
1	(Puerto Rico) (Jamaica)	Joanne Bauzà; Tamara Davis	7; 5	6; 1
2	(Puerto Rico) (Jamaica)	Mari Toró; Alexandra Chong	6; 0	6; 2
3	(Puerto Rico) (Jamaica)	Joanne Bauzà / Mari Toró; Alexandra Chong / Tamara Davis	6; 1	6; 2

== Cuba vs. Bahamas ==
Cuba
3
Chipinque Racquet Club, Monterrey, Mexico
27 April 1998
Hard (outdoors)

Bahamas
0

			1	2	3
1	(Cuba) (The Bahamas)	Yamile Cordova; Janelle Watson	6; 1	3; 1
2	(Cuba) (The Bahamas)	Yoannis Montesino; Kim Cartwright	6; 2	6; 4
3	(Cuba) (The Bahamas)	Yamile Cordova / Yoannis Montesino; Kim Cartwright / Jodi Saunders	6; 3	6; 1

== Dominican Republic vs. Bolivia ==
Dominican Republic
2
Chipinque Racquet Club, Monterrey, Mexico
27 April 1998
Hard (outdoors)

Bolivia
1

			1	2	3
1	(Dominican Republic) (Bolivia)	Mónika Pimentel; Daniela Álvarez	3; 6	3; 6
2	(Dominican Republic) (Bolivia)	Joelle Schad; Morya Peres	5; 7	6; 2	6; 3
3	(Dominican Republic) (Bolivia)	Glenny Cepeda / Joelle Schad; Claudia Herbas / Mónica Ribero	6; 1	6; 0

== Trinidad and Tobago vs. Panama ==
Trinidad and Tobago
2
Chipinque Racquet Club, Monterrey, Mexico
27 April 1998
Hard (outdoors)

Panama
1

			1	2	3
1	(Trinidad and Tobago) (Panama)	Jeanine Baillie; Anabelle Espinosa Rodríguez	3; 6	1; 6
2	(Trinidad and Tobago) (Panama)	Anneliese Rose; Lorena Porras	6; 1	6; 1
3	(Trinidad and Tobago) (Panama)	Jeanine Baillie / Anneliese Rose; Anabelle Espinosa Rodríguez / Lorena Porras	6; 0	7^{7} 6^{5}

== Puerto Rico vs. Bahamas ==
Puerto Rico
3
Chipinque Racquet Club, Monterrey, Mexico
28 April 1998
Hard (outdoors)

Bahamas
0

			1	2	3
1	(Puerto Rico) (The Bahamas)	Joanne Bauzà; Jodi Saunders	3; 6	6; 3	7; 5
2	(Puerto Rico) (The Bahamas)	Mari Toró; Kim Cartwright	6; 0	6; 1
3	(Puerto Rico) (The Bahamas)	Mari Toró / Edna Vásquez; Kim Cartwright / Janelle Watson	6; 0	6; 2

== Cuba vs. Panama ==
Cuba
3
Chipinque Racquet Club, Monterrey, Mexico
28 April 1998
Hard (outdoors)

Panama
0

			1	2	3
1	(Cuba) (Panama)	Yamile Cordova; Anabelle Espinosa Rodríguez	6; 2	6; 2
2	(Cuba) (Panama)	Yoannis Montesino; Lorena Porras	6; 0	6; 2
3	(Cuba) (Panama)	Yanelis Jiménez Estévez / Yanet Núñez Mojarena; Anabelle Espinosa Rodríguez / Ivonne Lorher	6; 4	6; 3

== Dominican Republic vs. Trinidad and Tobago ==
Dominican Republic
2
Chipinque Racquet Club, Monterrey, Mexico
28 April 1998
Hard (outdoors)

Trinidad and Tobago
1

			1	2	3
1	(Dominican Republic) (Trinidad and Tobago)	Glenny Cepeda; Jeanine Baillie	6; 3	6; 0
2	(Dominican Republic) (Trinidad and Tobago)	Joelle Schad; Anneliese Rose	6; 4	6; 3
3	(Dominican Republic) (Trinidad and Tobago)	Mónika Pimentel / Carla Prieto; Jeanine Baillie / Anneliese Rose	1; 6	0; 6

== Bolivia vs. Jamaica ==
Bolivia
2
Chipinque Racquet Club, Monterrey, Mexico
28 April 1998
Hard (outdoors)

Jamaica
1

			1	2	3
1	(Bolivia) (Jamaica)	Morya Peres; Alexandra Chong	7; 5	6; 1
2	(Bolivia) (Jamaica)	Claudia Herbas; Camille Walter	4; 6	1; 6
3	(Bolivia) (Jamaica)	Daniela Álvarez / Morya Peres; Alexandra Chong / Camille Walter	6; 4	2; 6	6; 3

== Puerto Rico vs. Bolivia ==
Puerto Rico
3
Chipinque Racquet Club, Monterrey, Mexico
29 April 1998
Hard (outdoors)

Bolivia
0

			1	2	3
1	(Puerto Rico) (Bolivia)	Joanne Bauzà; Daniela Álvarez	6; 2	4; 6	6; 3
2	(Puerto Rico) (Bolivia)	Mari Toró; Morya Peres	6; 2	6; 2
3	(Puerto Rico) (Bolivia)	Joanne Bauzà / Mari Toró; Claudia Herbas / Mónica Ribero	6; 1	6; 3

== Cuba vs. Dominican Republic ==
Cuba
2
Chipinque Racquet Club, Monterrey, Mexico
29 April 1998
Hard (outdoors)

Dominican Republic
1

			1	2	3
1	(Cuba) (Dominican Republic)	Yamile Cordova; Glenny Cepeda	6; 0	6; 0
2	(Cuba) (Dominican Republic)	Yoannis Montesino; Joelle Schad	6; 3	6; 2
3	(Cuba) (Dominican Republic)	Yanelis Jiménez Estévez / Yanet Núñez Mojarena; Glenny Cepeda / Carla Prieto	3; 6	6^{4} 7^{7}

== Trinidad and Tobago vs. Jamaica ==
Trinidad and Tobago
2
Chipinque Racquet Club, Monterrey, Mexico
29 April 1998
Hard (outdoors)

Jamaica
1

			1	2	3
1	(Trinidad and Tobago) (Jamaica)	Jeanine Baillie; Tamara Davis	6; 2	2; 6	7; 5
2	(Trinidad and Tobago) (Jamaica)	Anneliese Rose; Camille Walter	6; 1	6; 4
3	(Trinidad and Tobago) (Jamaica)	Nisha Naraynsingh / Camille Sesanker; Tamara Davis / Camille Walter	1; 6	1; 6

== Panama vs. Bahamas ==
Panama
2
Chipinque Racquet Club, Monterrey, Mexico
29 April 1998
Hard (outdoors)

Bahamas
1

			1	2	3
1	(Panama) (The Bahamas)	Anabelle Espinosa Rodríguez; Jodi Saunders	7^{7} 6^{4}	4; 6	7; 5
2	(Panama) (The Bahamas)	Lorena Porras; Janelle Watson	6; 1	6; 0
3	(Panama) (The Bahamas)	Ivonne Lorher / Lorena Porras; Kim Cartwright / Jodi Saunders	2; 6	4; 6

== Puerto Rico vs. Panama ==
Puerto Rico
2
Chipinque Racquet Club, Monterrey, Mexico
30 April 1998
Hard (outdoors)

Panama
1

			1	2	3
1	(Puerto Rico) (Panama)	María Elena del Valle; Anabelle Espinosa Rodríguez	6; 3	7; 5
2	(Puerto Rico) (Panama)	Mari Toró; Lorena Porras	4; 6	6; 1	4; 6
3	(Puerto Rico) (Panama)	Joanne Bauzà / Mari Toró; Anabelle Espinosa Rodríguez / Lorena Porras	6; 2	6; 4

== Cuba vs. Jamaica ==
Cuba
3
Chipinque Racquet Club, Monterrey, Mexico
30 April 1998
Hard (outdoors)

Jamaica
0

			1	2	3
1	(Cuba) (Jamaica)	Yamile Cordova; Tamara Davis	6; 3	6; 3
2	(Cuba) (Jamaica)	Yoannis Montesino; Alexandra Chong	6; 1	6; 2
3	(Cuba) (Jamaica)	Yanelis Jiménez Estévez / Yanet Núñez Mojarena; Alexandra Chong / Tamara Davis	6; 0	6; 4

== Dominican Republic vs. Bahamas ==
Dominican Republic
2
Chipinque Racquet Club, Monterrey, Mexico
30 April 1998
Hard (outdoors)

Bahamas
1

			1	2	3
1	(Dominican Republic) (The Bahamas)	Mónika Pimentel; Janelle Watson	6; 3	4; 6	2; 6
2	(Dominican Republic) (The Bahamas)	Joelle Schad; Kim Cartwright	6; 0	6; 0
3	(Dominican Republic) (The Bahamas)	Mónika Pimentel / Joelle Schad; Kim Cartwright / Janelle Watson	7; 5	6; 4

== Trinidad and Tobago vs. Bolivia ==
Trinidad and Tobago
2
Chipinque Racquet Club, Monterrey, Mexico
30 April 1998
Hard (outdoors)

Bolivia
1

			1	2	3
1	(Trinidad and Tobago) (Bolivia)	Jeanine Baillie; Mónica Ribero	4; 6	6^{3} 7^{7}
2	(Trinidad and Tobago) (Bolivia)	Anneliese Rose; Claudia Herbas	6; 2	6; 2
3	(Trinidad and Tobago) (Bolivia)	Jeanine Baillie / Anneliese Rose; Morya Peres / Mónica Ribero	6; 2	6; 4

== Puerto Rico vs. Trinidad and Tobago ==
Puerto Rico
3
Chipinque Racquet Club, Monterrey, Mexico
1 May 1998
Hard (outdoors)

Trinidad and Tobago
0

			1	2	3
1	(Puerto Rico) (Trinidad and Tobago)	Joanne Bauzà; Jeanine Baillie	6; 1	6; 1
2	(Puerto Rico) (Trinidad and Tobago)	Mari Toró; Anneliese Rose	6; 2	7^{7} 6^{2}
3	(Puerto Rico) (Trinidad and Tobago)	Joanne Bauzà / Mari Toró; Jeanine Baillie / Anneliese Rose	6; 3	6; 2

== Cuba vs. Bolivia ==
Cuba
3
Chipinque Racquet Club, Monterrey, Mexico
1 May 1998
Hard (outdoors)

Bolivia
0

			1	2	3
1	(Cuba) (Bolivia)	Yamile Cordova; Daniela Álvarez	6; 2	6; 2
2	(Cuba) (Bolivia)	Yoannis Montesino; Morya Peres	6; 2	6; 1
3	(Cuba) (Bolivia)	Yamile Cordova / Yoannis Montesino; Morya Peres / Mónica Ribero	6; 3	6; 3

== Dominican Republic vs. Panama ==
Dominican Republic
2
Chipinque Racquet Club, Monterrey, Mexico
1 May 1998
Hard (outdoors)

Panama
1

			1	2	3
1	(Dominican Republic) (Panama)	Carla Prieto; Anabelle Espinosa Rodríguez	1; 6	3; 6
2	(Dominican Republic) (Panama)	Joelle Schad; Lorena Porras	6; 1	6; 4
3	(Dominican Republic) (Panama)	Glenny Cepeda / Joelle Schad; Anabelle Espinosa Rodríguez / Lorena Porras	6; 2	4; 6	6; 1

== Jamaica vs. Bahamas ==
Jamaica
3
Chipinque Racquet Club, Monterrey, Mexico
1 May 1998
Hard (outdoors)

Bahamas
0

			1	2	3
1	(Jamaica) (The Bahamas)	Tamara Davis; Jodi Saunders	6; 0	3; 4		retired
2	(Jamaica) (The Bahamas)	Camille Walter; Janelle Watson	6; 2	6; 1
3	(Jamaica) (The Bahamas)	Alexandra Chong / Camille Walter; Kim Cartwright / Janelle Watson	6; 1	6; 2

== Puerto Rico vs. Dominican Republic ==
Puerto Rico
2
Chipinque Racquet Club, Monterrey, Mexico
2 May 1998
Hard (outdoors)

Dominican Republic
1

			1	2	3
1	(Puerto Rico) (Dominican Republic)	Joanne Bauzà; Mónika Pimentel	6; 0	6; 0
2	(Puerto Rico) (Dominican Republic)	Mari Toró; Joelle Schad	6; 3	2; 6	6; 2
3	(Puerto Rico) (Dominican Republic)	María Elena del Valle / Edna Vásquez; Glenny Cepeda / Carla Prieto	3; 6	6^{5} 7^{7}

== Cuba vs. Trinidad and Tobago ==
Cuba
3
Chipinque Racquet Club, Monterrey, Mexico
2 May 1998
Hard (outdoors)

Trinidad and Tobago
0

			1	2	3
1	(Cuba) (Trinidad and Tobago)	Yamile Cordova; Camille Sesanker	6; 0	6; 1
2	(Cuba) (Trinidad and Tobago)	Yoannis Montesino; Anneliese Rose	6; 1	5; 7	6; 2
3	(Cuba) (Trinidad and Tobago)	Yamile Cordova / Yanet Núñez Mojarena; Jeanine Baillie / Nisha Naraynsingh	6; 1	6; 0

== Panama vs. Jamaica ==
Panama
3
Chipinque Racquet Club, Monterrey, Mexico
2 May 1998
Hard (outdoors)

Jamaica
0

			1	2	3
1	(Panama) (Jamaica)	Anabelle Espinosa Rodríguez; Alexandra Chong	6; 3	6; 3
2	(Panama) (Jamaica)	Lorena Porras; Camille Walter	1; 6	6; 1	6; 3
3	(Panama) (Jamaica)	Anabelle Espinosa Rodríguez / Lorena Porras; Alexandra Chong / Tamara Davis	6; 2	6; 2

== Bolivia vs. Bahamas ==
Bolivia
1
Chipinque Racquet Club, Monterrey, Mexico
2 May 1998
Hard (outdoors)

Bahamas
2

			1	2	3
1	(Bolivia) (The Bahamas)	Daniela Álvarez; Janelle Watson	6; 4	7; 5
2	(Bolivia) (The Bahamas)	Morya Peres; Kim Cartwright	6; 1	2; 6	2; 6
3	(Bolivia) (The Bahamas)	Daniela Álvarez / Claudia Herbas; Kim Cartwright / Jodi Saunders	3; 6	0; 6

== Puerto Rico vs. Cuba ==
Puerto Rico
2
Chipinque Racquet Club, Monterrey, Mexico
3 May 1998
Hard (outdoors)

Cuba
1

			1	2	3
1	(Puerto Rico) (Cuba)	Joanne Bauzà; Yamile Cordova	1; 6	1; 6
2	(Puerto Rico) (Cuba)	Mari Toró; Yoannis Montesino	6; 4	6; 0
3	(Puerto Rico) (Cuba)	Joanne Bauzà / Mari Toró; Yamile Cordova / Yoannis Montesino	6; 1	2; 6	6; 3

== Dominican Republic vs. Jamaica ==
Dominican Republic
3
Chipinque Racquet Club, Monterrey, Mexico
3 May 1998
Hard (outdoors)

Jamaica
0

			1	2	3
1	(Dominican Republic) (Jamaica)	Glenny Cepeda; Tamara Davis	6; 2	6; 0
2	(Dominican Republic) (Jamaica)	Joelle Schad; Camille Walter	7; 5	6; 0
3	(Dominican Republic) (Jamaica)	Glenny Cepeda / Carla Prieto; Alexandra Chong / Camille Walter	7^{11} 6^{9}	3; 6	7; 5

== Trinidad and Tobago vs. Bahamas ==
Trinidad and Tobago
3
Chipinque Racquet Club, Monterrey, Mexico
3 May 1998
Hard (outdoors)

Bahamas
0

			1	2	3
1	(Trinidad and Tobago) (The Bahamas)	Jeanine Baillie; Janelle Watson	6; 2	6; 0
2	(Trinidad and Tobago) (The Bahamas)	Anneliese Rose; Kim Cartwright	6; 1	6; 2
3	(Trinidad and Tobago) (The Bahamas)	Jeanine Baillie / Anneliese Rose; Kim Cartwright / Jodi Saunders	5; 7	6; 2	6; 1

== Panama vs. Bolivia ==
Panama
2
Chipinque Racquet Club, Monterrey, Mexico
3 May 1998
Hard (outdoors)

Bolivia
1

			1	2	3
1	(Panama) (Bolivia)	Anabelle Espinosa Rodríguez; Daniela Álvarez	2; 6	2; 6
2	(Panama) (Bolivia)	Lorena Porras; Morya Peres	6; 3	1; 6	6; 2
3	(Panama) (Bolivia)	Anabelle Espinosa Rodríguez / Lorena Porras; Daniela Álvarez / Morya Peres	7; 5	6; 3

- Puerto Rico placed first in the pool, and thus advanced to Group I in 1999, where they placed last in their pool of five and thus was relegated back to Group II for 2000.

== See also ==
- Fed Cup structure
