= 1999 Fed Cup Americas Zone =

Subsection of tennis competition

The Americas Zone was one of three zones of regional competition in the 1999 Fed Cup.

== Group I ==
- Venue: Buenos Aires T.C., Buenos Aires, Argentina (outdoor clay)
- Date: 13–18 April

The ten teams were randomly divided into two pools of five teams to compete in round-robin competitions. The teams that finished first in the pools played-off to determine which team would partake in the World Group II Play-offs, while the teams that finished last in the pools would be relegated to Group II for 2000.

=== Pools ===
	Pool A	ARG	COL	PAR	MEX	ECU
1	Argentina (4–0)		3–0	3–0	3–0	3–0
2	Colombia (3–1)	0–3		3–0	3–0	3–0
3	Paraguay (2–2)	0–3	0–3		2–1	2–1
4	Mexico (1–3)	0–3	0–3	1–2		2–1
5	Ecuador (0–4)	0–3	0–3	1–2	1–2	

	Pool B	VEN	CAN	BRA	CHI	PUR
1	Venezuela (4–0)		2–1	3–0	2–1	3–0
2	Canada (3–1)	1–2		2–1	3–0	3–0
3	Brazil (2–2)	0–3	1–2		2–1	3–0
4	Chile (1–3)	1–2	0–3	1–2		3–0
5	Puerto Rico (0–4)	0–3	0–3	0–3	0–3	

=== Play-off ===
Argentina
3
Buenos Aires T.C., Buenos Aires, Argentina
18 April 1999
Clay (outdoors)

Venezuela
0

			1	2	3
1	(Argentina) (Venezuela)	Mariana Díaz Oliva; Milagros Sequera	6; 0	6; 3
2	(Argentina) (Venezuela)	Paola Suárez; María Vento	7; 5	3; 6	6; 2
3	(Argentina) (Venezuela)	Inés Gorrochategui / Patricia Tarabini; Milagros Sequera / María Vento	7^{7} 6^{5}	6; 1

- Argentina advanced to World Group II Play-offs.
- Ecuador and Puerto Rico relegated to Group II in 2000.

== Group II ==
- Venue: Costa Rica Country Club, San José, Costa Rica (outdoor hard)
- Date: 23–27 February

The sixteen teams were randomly divided into four pools of four teams to compete in round-robin competitions. The top teams of each pool play-off in a two-round knockout stage with the two winners advancing to Group I for 2000.

=== Pools ===
	Pool A	URU	DOM	CRC	GUA
1	Uruguay (3–0)		2–1	3–0	3–0
2	Dominican Republic (1–2)	1–2		1–2	2–1
3	Costa Rica (1–2)	0–3	2–1		1–2
4	Guatemala (1–2)	0–3	1–2	2–1	

	Pool B	CUB	BAH	ESA	HAI
1	Cuba (3–0)		3–0	3–0	3–0
2	Bahamas (2–1)	0–3		3–0	2–1
3	El Salvador (1–2)	0–3	0–3		3–0
4	Haiti (0–3)	0–3	1–2	0–3	

	Pool C	BOL	BAR	TRI	PAN
1	Bolivia (3–0)		3–0	3–0	3–0
2	Barbados (2–1)	0–3		2–1	2–1
3	Trinidad and Tobago (1–2)	0–3	1–2		2–1
4	Panama (0–3)	0–3	1–2	1–2	

	Pool D	PER	JAM	BER	ATG
1	Peru (3–0)		3–0	3–0	3–0
2	Jamaica (2–1)	0–3		3–0	3–0
3	Bermuda (1–2)	0–3	0–3		2–1
4	Antigua and Barbuda (0–3)	0–3	0–3	1–2	

=== Knockout stage ===
Semifinals
Uruguay	3
Bahamas	0
Jamaica	0
Bolivia	3
Cuba	3
Barbados	0
Dominican Republic	0
Peru	3

Finals
Uruguay	2
Bolivia	1
Cuba	2
Peru	1

- Uruguay and Cuba advanced to Group I for 2000.

== See also ==
- Fed Cup structure
