= 1996 Fed Cup Americas Zone Group II – Pool B =

1996 Fed Cup Americas Zone Group II: Group B

Group B of the 1996 Fed Cup Americas Zone Group II was one of two pools in the Americas Zone Group II of the 1996 Fed Cup. Six teams competed in a round robin competition, with the teams coming first advancing to Group I in 1997.

	(Peru) PER	(Cuba) CUB	(Dominican Republic) DOM	(Costa Rica) CRC	(Trinidad and Tobago) TRI	(Jamaica) JAM	(Bermuda) BER	Match; W–L	Set; W–L	Game; W–L	Standings
Peru		1–2	3–0	3–0	2–1	3–0	3–0	5–1	31–8	220–124	1
Cuba	2–1		1–2	3–0	3–0	3–0	3–0	5–1	30–9	207–113	2
Dominican Republic	0–3	2–1		2–1	3–0	2–1	3–0	5–1	27–13	196–122	3
Costa Rica	0–3	0–3	1–2		3–0	2–1	2–1	3–3	16–23	152–171	4
Trinidad and Tobago	1–2	0–3	0–3	0–3		2–1	3–0	2–4	14–26	138–201	5
Jamaica	0–3	0–3	1–2	1–2	1–2		3–0	1–5	18–25	171–196	6
Bermuda	0–3	0–3	0–3	1–2	0–3	0–3		0–6	2–34	57–212	7

== Cuba vs. Trinidad and Tobago ==
Cuba
3
Santo Domingo, Dominican Republic
6 May 1996
Har-Tru clay (outdoors)

Trinidad and Tobago
0

			1	2	3
1	(Cuba) (Trinidad and Tobago)	Belkis Rodríguez; Jeanine Baillie	6; 0	6; 2
2	(Cuba) (Trinidad and Tobago)	Yoannis Montesino; Anneliese Rose	6; 2	6; 1
3	(Cuba) (Trinidad and Tobago)	Yoannis Montesino / Belkis Rodríguez; Jeanine Baillie / Anneliese Rose	6; 2	6; 1

== Dominican Republic vs. Bermuda ==
Dominican Republic
3
Santo Domingo, Dominican Republic
6 May 1996
Har-Tru clay (outdoors)

Bermuda
0

			1	2	3
1	(Dominican Republic) (Bermuda)	Glenny Cepeda; Kim Simmons	6; 1	6; 1
2	(Dominican Republic) (Bermuda)	Joelle Schad; Donna Bradshaw	6; 0	6; 1
3	(Dominican Republic) (Bermuda)	Glenny Cepeda / Mónika Pimentel; Gill Butterfield / Kelly Holland	6; 2	6; 2

== Costa Rica vs. Jamaica ==
Costa Rica
2
Santo Domingo, Dominican Republic
6 May 1996
Har-Tru clay (outdoors)

Jamaica
1

			1	2	3
1	(Costa Rica) (Jamaica)	Melissa Golfin; Camille Walter	6; 2	6; 3
2	(Costa Rica) (Jamaica)	Paula Umaña; Sasha Hanna	6; 3	3; 6	6; 4
3	(Costa Rica) (Jamaica)	Paola Almeida / Melania Mirambell; Alanna Broderick / Camille Walter	1; 6	1; 6

== Peru vs. Bermuda ==
Peru
3
Santo Domingo, Dominican Republic
7 May 1996
Har-Tru clay (outdoors)

Bermuda
0

			1	2	3
1	(Peru) (Bermuda)	María Eugenia Rojas; Kim Simmons	6; 1	6; 1
2	(Peru) (Bermuda)	Déborah Gaviria; Donna Bradshaw	6; 2	6; 1
3	(Peru) (Bermuda)	María Eugenia Rojas / Nanely Vallejo; Donna Bradshaw / Kelly Holland	6; 0	6; 1

== Cuba vs. Costa Rica ==
Cuba
3
Santo Domingo, Dominican Republic
7 May 1996
Har-Tru clay (outdoors)

Costa Rica
0

			1	2	3
1	(Cuba) (Costa Rica)	Belkis Rodríguez; Melissa Golfin	6; 2	6; 1
2	(Cuba) (Costa Rica)	Yoannis Montesino; Paula Umaña	6; 1	6; 2
3	(Cuba) (Costa Rica)	Yamile Cordova / Belkis Rodríguez; Melissa Golfin / Paula Umaña	6; 4	6; 3

== Dominican Republic vs. Trinidad and Tobago ==
Dominican Republic
3
Santo Domingo, Dominican Republic
7 May 1996
Har-Tru clay (outdoors)

Trinidad and Tobago
0

			1	2	3
1	(Dominican Republic) (Trinidad and Tobago)	Mónika Pimentel; Jeanine Baillie	6; 3	5; 7	6; 2
2	(Dominican Republic) (Trinidad and Tobago)	Joelle Schad; Anneliese Rose	6; 0	6; 4
3	(Dominican Republic) (Trinidad and Tobago)	Glenny Cepeda / Joelle Schad; Tiffini Huggins / Camille Sesanker	6; 1	6; 0

== Peru vs. Cuba ==
Peru
1
Santo Domingo, Dominican Republic
8 May 1996
Har-Tru clay (outdoors)

Cuba
2

			1	2	3
1	(Peru) (Cuba)	María Eugenia Rojas; Belkis Rodríguez	4; 6	6; 1	4; 6
2	(Peru) (Cuba)	Déborah Gaviria; Yoannis Montesino	6; 4	6; 4
3	(Peru) (Cuba)	Déborah Gaviria / María Eugenia Rojas; Yoannis Montesino / Belkis Rodríguez	1; 6	6^{5} 7^{7}

== Dominican Republic vs. Jamaica ==
Dominican Republic
2
Santo Domingo, Dominican Republic
8 May 1996
Har-Tru clay (outdoors)

Jamaica
1

			1	2	3
1	(Dominican Republic) (Jamaica)	Glenny Cepeda; Alanna Broderick	2; 6	6; 2	7; 9
2	(Dominican Republic) (Jamaica)	Joelle Schad; Sasha Hanna	6; 0	6; 1
3	(Dominican Republic) (Jamaica)	Glenny Cepeda / Joelle Schad; Sasha Hanna / Camille Walter	6; 1	6; 3

== Costa Rica vs. Jamaica ==
Costa Rica
3
Santo Domingo, Dominican Republic
8 May 1996
Har-Tru clay (outdoors)

Jamaica
0

			1	2	3
1	(Costa Rica) (Jamaica)	Melissa Golfin; Jeanine Baillie	4; 6	6; 2	6; 0
2	(Costa Rica) (Jamaica)	Paula Umaña; Anneliese Rose	6; 4	6; 4
3	(Costa Rica) (Jamaica)	Paola Almeida / Melania Mirambell; Tiffini Huggins / Camille Sesanker	6; 4	6; 2

== Peru vs. Trinidad and Tobago ==
Peru
2
Santo Domingo, Dominican Republic
9 May 1996
Har-Tru clay (outdoors)

Trinidad and Tobago
1

			1	2	3
1	(Peru) (Trinidad and Tobago)	María Eugenia Rojas; Jeanine Baillie	6; 0	6; 0
2	(Peru) (Trinidad and Tobago)	Déborah Gaviria; Anneliese Rose	1; 6	6^{2} 7^{7}
3	(Peru) (Trinidad and Tobago)	Déborah Gaviria / Nanely Vallejo; Jeanine Baillie / Anneliese Rose	6; 2	7; 5

== Cuba vs. Jamaica ==
Cuba
3
Santo Domingo, Dominican Republic
9 May 1996
Har-Tru clay (outdoors)

Jamaica
0

			1	2	3
1	(Cuba) (Jamaica)	Belkis Rodríguez; Alanna Broderick	4; 6	6; 2	6; 1
2	(Cuba) (Jamaica)	Yoannis Montesino; Camille Walter	6; 2	6; 0
3	(Cuba) (Jamaica)	Yamile Cordova / Yoannis Montesino; Sasha Hanna / Camille Walter	4; 6	6; 2	6; 4

== Costa Rica vs. Bermuda ==
Costa Rica
2
Santo Domingo, Dominican Republic
9 May 1996
Har-Tru clay (outdoors)

Bermuda
1

			1	2	3
1	(Costa Rica) (Bermuda)	Melissa Golfin; Kim Simmons	6; 0	6; 1
2	(Costa Rica) (Bermuda)	Paula Umaña; Donna Bradshaw	6; 0	6; 0
3	(Costa Rica) (Bermuda)	Paola Almeida / Melania Mirambell; Gill Butterfield / Kelly Holland	3; 6	3; 6

== Peru vs. Costa Rica ==
Peru
3
Santo Domingo, Dominican Republic
10 May 1996
Har-Tru clay (outdoors)

Costa Rica
0

			1	2	3
1	(Peru) (Costa Rica)	María Eugenia Rojas; Melissa Golfin	6; 4	6; 2
2	(Peru) (Costa Rica)	Déborah Gaviria; Paula Umaña	6; 3	6; 3
3	(Peru) (Costa Rica)	María Eugenia Rojas / Nanely Vallejo; Melissa Golfin / Paula Umaña	7; 5	6; 4

== Cuba vs. Dominican Republic ==
Cuba
1
Santo Domingo, Dominican Republic
10 May 1996
Har-Tru clay (outdoors)

Dominican Republic
2

			1	2	3
1	(Cuba) (Dominican Republic)	Belkis Rodríguez; Mónika Pimentel	6; 2	6; 3
2	(Cuba) (Dominican Republic)	Yoannis Montesino; Joelle Schad	2; 6	0; 6
3	(Cuba) (Dominican Republic)	Yoannis Montesino / Belkis Rodríguez; Glenny Cepeda / Joelle Schad	2; 6	3; 6

== Jamaica vs. Bermuda ==
Jamaica
3
Santo Domingo, Dominican Republic
10 May 1996
Har-Tru clay (outdoors)

Bermuda
0

			1	2	3
1	(Jamaica) (Bermuda)	Kadija Richards; Kim Simmons	6; 3	6; 1
2	(Jamaica) (Bermuda)	Sasha Hanna; Donna Bradshaw	6; 1	6; 1
3	(Jamaica) (Bermuda)	Sasha Hanna / Camille Richards; Gill Butterfield / Kelly Holland	6; 1	6; 0

- Gill Butterfield, who with played for Bermuda in the doubles rubber with Kelly Holland, holds the Fed Cup record for the oldest player at 52 years and 162 days.

== Peru vs. Jamaica ==
Peru
3
Santo Domingo, Dominican Republic
11 May 1996
Har-Tru clay (outdoors)

Jamaica
0

			1	2	3
1	(Peru) (Jamaica)	María Eugenia Rojas; Alanna Broderick	6; 3	6; 1
2	(Peru) (Jamaica)	Déborah Gaviria; Sasha Hanna	7; 5	7; 5
3	(Peru) (Jamaica)	María Eugenia Rojas / Nanely Vallejo; Sasha Hanna / Camille Walter	6; 0	6^{3} 7^{7}	6; 4

== Dominican Republic vs. Costa Rica ==
Dominican Republic
2
Santo Domingo, Dominican Republic
11 May 1996
Har-Tru clay (outdoors)

Costa Rica
1

			1	2	3
1	(Dominican Republic) (Costa Rica)	Mónika Pimentel; Melissa Golfin	6; 3	1; 6	2; 6
2	(Dominican Republic) (Costa Rica)	Joelle Schad; Paula Umaña	6; 0	6; 1
3	(Dominican Republic) (Costa Rica)	Glenny Cepeda / Joelle Schad; Melissa Golfin / Paula Umaña	6; 0	6; 3

== Trinidad and Tobago vs. Bermuda ==
Trinidad and Tobago
3
Santo Domingo, Dominican Republic
11 May 1996
Har-Tru clay (outdoors)

Bermuda
0

			1	2	3
1	(Trinidad and Tobago) (Bermuda)	Tiffini Huggins; Kim Simmons	6; 2	6; 2
2	(Trinidad and Tobago) (Bermuda)	Anneliese Rose; Donna Bradshaw	6; 3	6; 0
3	(Trinidad and Tobago) (Bermuda)	Jeanine Baillie / Camille Sesanker; Donna Bradshaw / Kelly Holland	7; 5	7; 5

== Peru vs. Dominican Republic ==
Peru
3
Santo Domingo, Dominican Republic
12 May 1996
Har-Tru clay (outdoors)

Dominican Republic
0

			1	2	3
1	(Peru) (Dominican Republic)	María Eugenia Rojas; Glenny Cepeda	6; 3	6; 1
2	(Peru) (Dominican Republic)	Déborah Gaviria; Joelle Schad	6; 4	2; 6	6; 4
3	(Peru) (Dominican Republic)	Déborah Gaviria / Nanely Vallejo; Glenny Cepeda / Joelle Schad	6; 0	6; 4

== Cuba vs. Bermuda ==
Cuba
3
Santo Domingo, Dominican Republic
12 May 1996
Har-Tru clay (outdoors)

Bermuda
0

			1	2	3
1	(Cuba) (Bermuda)	Yamile Cordova; Kim Simmons	6; 0	6; 0
2	(Cuba) (Bermuda)	Yoannis Montesino; Donna Bradshaw	6; 1	6; 2
3	(Cuba) (Bermuda)	Yoannis Montesino / Belkis Rodríguez; Donna Bradshaw / Kelly Holland	6; 3	6; 1

== Trinidad and Tobago vs. Jamaica ==
Trinidad and Tobago
3
Santo Domingo, Dominican Republic
12 May 1996
Har-Tru clay (outdoors)

Jamaica
0

			1	2	3
1	(Trinidad and Tobago) (Jamaica)	Jeanine Baillie; Alanna Broderick	0; 6	2; 6
2	(Trinidad and Tobago) (Jamaica)	Anneliese Rose; Camille Walter	4; 6	7; 5	6; 0
3	(Trinidad and Tobago) (Jamaica)	Jeanine Baillie / Anneliese Rose; Alanna Broderick / Camille Walter	6; 1	1; 6	7; 5

- Peru placed first in the pool, and thus advanced to Group I in 1997, where they placed second in their pool of five.

== See also ==
- Fed Cup structure
