= 1999 Fed Cup Americas Zone Group II – Pool B =

International tennis competition

Group B of the 1999 Fed Cup Americas Zone Group II was one of two pools in the Americas Zone Group II of the 1999 Fed Cup. Four teams competed in a round robin competition, with the top two teams advancing to the knockout stage.

| | (Cuba) CUB | (The Bahamas) BAH | (El Salvador) ESA | (Haiti) HAI | RR; W–L | Set; W–L | Game; W–L | Standings |
| Cuba | | 3–0 | 3–0 | 3–0 | 3–0 | 18–0 | 110–45 | 1 |
| Bahamas | 0–3 | | 3–0 | 2–1 | 2–1 | 11–10 | 91–95 | 2 |
| El Salvador | 0–3 | 0–3 | | 3–0 | 1–2 | 8–13 | 86–101 | 3 |
| Haiti | 0–3 | 1–2 | 0–3 | | 0–3 | 3–17 | 64–110 | 4 |

== Cuba vs. El Salvador ==
Cuba
3
Costa Rica Country Club, San José, Costa Rica
23 February 1999
Hard (outdoors)

El Salvador
0

| | | | 1 | 2 | 3 |
|---|---|---|---|---|---|
| 1 | (Cuba) (El Salvador) | Yamile Cordova; Claudia Argumedo | 6; 1 | 6; 1 |
| 2 | (Cuba) (El Salvador) | Yoannis Montesino; Ingrid González | 6; 2 | 6; 0 |
| 3 | (Cuba) (El Salvador) | Yamile Cordova / Yoannis Montesino; Annette Falkenberg / Ingrid González | 6; 4 | 7; 5 |

== Bahamas vs. Haiti ==
Bahamas
2
Costa Rica Country Club, San José, Costa Rica
23 February 1999
Hard (outdoors)

Haiti
1

| | | | 1 | 2 | 3 |
|---|---|---|---|---|---|
| 1 | (The Bahamas) (Haiti) | Jodi Saunders; Stephanie Bernadel | 6; 2 | 6; 0 |
| 2 | (The Bahamas) (Haiti) | Kim Cartwright; Jennifer Adrien | 6; 4 | 7; 5 |
| 3 | (The Bahamas) (Haiti) | Nikkita Fountain / Sharon Green; Jennifer Adrien / Genevieve Etienne | 6; 2 | 3; 6 | 0; 6 |

== Cuba vs. Bahamas ==
Cuba
3
Costa Rica Country Club, San José, Costa Rica
24 February 1999
Hard (outdoors)

Bahamas
0

| | | | 1 | 2 | 3 |
|---|---|---|---|---|---|
| 1 | (Cuba) (The Bahamas) | Yamile Fors Guerra; Jodi Saunders | 6; 2 | 6; 1 |
| 2 | (Cuba) (The Bahamas) | Yoannis Montesino; Kim Cartwright | 6; 2 | 6; 1 |
| 3 | (Cuba) (The Bahamas) | Yamile Cordova / Yoannis Montesino; Kim Cartwright / Jodi Saunders | 6; 4 | 6; 3 |

== El Salvador vs. Haiti ==
El Salvador
3
Costa Rica Country Club, San José, Costa Rica
24 February 1999
Hard (outdoors)

Haiti
0

| | | | 1 | 2 | 3 |
|---|---|---|---|---|---|
| 1 | (El Salvador) (Haiti) | Claudia Argumedo; Genevieve Etienne | 6; 1 | 2; 6 | 6; 2 |
| 2 | (El Salvador) (Haiti) | Ingrid González; Jennifer Adrien | 7; 5 | 6; 2 |
| 3 | (El Salvador) (Haiti) | Claudia Argumedo / Ingrid González; Stephanie Bernadel / Genevieve Etienne | 6; 3 | 6; 1 |

== Cuba vs. Haiti ==
Cuba
3
Costa Rica Country Club, San José, Costa Rica
25 February 1999
Hard (outdoors)

Haiti
0

| | | | 1 | 2 | 3 |
|---|---|---|---|---|---|
| 1 | (Cuba) (Haiti) | Yamile Fors Guerra; Genevieve Etienne | 6; 0 | 6; 4 |
| 2 | (Cuba) (Haiti) | Yamile Cordova; Stephanie Bernadel | 6; 4 | 6; 1 |
| 3 | (Cuba) (Haiti) | Yamile Fors Guerra / Wendy Galán Domínguez; Jennifer Adrien / Genevieve Etienne | 6; 4 | 7^{7} 6^{4} |

== Bahamas vs. El Salvador ==
Bahamas
3
Costa Rica Country Club, San José, Costa Rica
25 February 1999
Hard (outdoors)

El Salvador
0

| | | | 1 | 2 | 3 |
|---|---|---|---|---|---|
| 1 | (The Bahamas) (El Salvador) | Nikkita Fountain; Claudia Argumedo | 4; 6 | 6; 2 | 6; 4 |
| 2 | (The Bahamas) (El Salvador) | Kim Cartwright; Ingrid González | 6; 3 | 3; 6 | 6; 4 |
| 3 | (The Bahamas) (El Salvador) | Sharon Green / Jodi Saunders; Annette Falkenberg / Ingrid González | 6; 3 | 7^{7} 6^{3} |

== See also ==
- Fed Cup structure
