= 1999 Fed Cup Americas Zone Group II – Pool A =

Group A of the 1999 Fed Cup Americas Zone Group II was one of two pools in the Americas Zone Group II of the 1999 Fed Cup. Four teams competed in a round robin competition, with the top two teams advancing to the knockout stage.

| | (Uruguay) URU | (Dominican Republic) DOM | (Costa Rica) CRC | (Guatemala) GUA | RR; W–L | Set; W–L | Game; W–L | Standings |
| Uruguay | | 2–1 | 3–0 | 3–0 | 3–0 | 17–2 | 105–52 | 1 |
| Dominican Republic | 1–2 | | 1–2 | 2–1 | 1–2 | 10–12 | 99–100 | 2 |
| Costa Rica | 0–3 | 2–1 | | 1–2 | 1–2 | 9–13 | 94–108 | 3 |
| Guatemala | 0–3 | 1–2 | 2–1 | | 1–2 | 6–15 | 70–118 | 4 |

== Uruguay vs. Dominican Republic ==
Uruguay
2
Costa Rica Country Club, San José, Costa Rica
23 February 1999
Hard (outdoors)

Dominican Republic
1

| | | | 1 | 2 | 3 |
|---|---|---|---|---|---|
| 1 | (Uruguay) (Dominican Republic) | Cecilia Guillenea; Carla Prieto | 6; 1 | 4; 6 | 2; 6 |
| 2 | (Uruguay) (Dominican Republic) | Daniela Olivera; Glenny Cepeda | 6; 4 | 6; 0 |
| 3 | (Uruguay) (Dominican Republic) | Daniela Olivera / Virginia Sadi; Glenny Cepeda / Carla Prieto | 7; 5 | 7^{7} 6^{3} |

== Costa Rica vs. Guatemala ==
Costa Rica
1
Costa Rica Country Club, San José, Costa Rica
23 February 1999
Hard (outdoors)

Guatemala
2

| | | | 1 | 2 | 3 |
|---|---|---|---|---|---|
| 1 | (Costa Rica) (Guatemala) | Melissa Golfin; Mariola Prado | 6; 2 | 6; 4 |
| 2 | (Costa Rica) (Guatemala) | Érika Villalobos Morsink; Luise-Elfride López | 6^{4} 7^{7} | 7^{7} 6^{5} | 1; 6 |
| 3 | (Costa Rica) (Guatemala) | Melissa Mendieta / Érika Villalobos Morsink; Luise-Elfride López / Mariola Prado | 0; 6 | 6; 1 | 2; 6 |

== Uruguay vs. Guatemala ==
Uruguay
3
Costa Rica Country Club, San José, Costa Rica
24 February 1999
Hard (outdoors)

Guatemala
0

| | | | 1 | 2 | 3 |
|---|---|---|---|---|---|
| 1 | (Uruguay) (Guatemala) | Cecilia Guillenea; Mariola Prado | 6; 0 | 6; 2 |
| 2 | (Uruguay) (Guatemala) | Daniela Olivera; Luise-Elfride López | 6; 1 | 6; 0 |
| 3 | (Uruguay) (Guatemala) | Daniela Peyrot / Virginia Sadi; Johanna Bihr / María Fernanda Carrillo | 6; 2 | 6; 2 |

== Dominican Republic vs. Costa Rica ==
Dominican Republic
1
Costa Rica Country Club, San José, Costa Rica
24 February 1999
Hard (outdoors)

Costa Rica
2

| | | | 1 | 2 | 3 |
|---|---|---|---|---|---|
| 1 | (Dominican Republic) (Costa Rica) | Carla Prieto; Melissa Golfin | 3; 6 | 6; 2 | 0; 6 |
| 2 | (Dominican Republic) (Costa Rica) | Glenny Cepeda; Melissa Mendieta | 3; 6 | 3; 6 |
| 3 | (Dominican Republic) (Costa Rica) | Glenny Cepeda / Carla Prieto; Melissa Golfin / Érika Villalobos Morsink | 3; 6 | 6; 4 | 9; 7 |

== Uruguay vs. Costa Rica ==
Uruguay
3
Costa Rica Country Club, San José, Costa Rica
25 February 1999
Hard (outdoors)

Costa Rica
0

| | | | 1 | 2 | 3 |
|---|---|---|---|---|---|
| 1 | (Uruguay) (Costa Rica) | Virginia Sadi; Melissa Golfin | 6; 2 | 6; 3 |
| 2 | (Uruguay) (Costa Rica) | Daniela Olivera; Melissa Mendieta | 6; 3 | 6; 1 |
| 3 | (Uruguay) (Costa Rica) | Cecilia Guillenea / Daniela Peyrot; Melissa Golfin / Érika Villalobos Morsink | 6; 2 | 7^{8} 6^{6} |

== Dominican Republic vs. Guatemala ==
Dominican Republic
2
Costa Rica Country Club, San José, Costa Rica
25 February 1999
Hard (outdoors)

Guatemala
1

| | | | 1 | 2 | 3 |
|---|---|---|---|---|---|
| 1 | (Dominican Republic) (Guatemala) | Daysi Espinal; Mariola Prado | 6; 1 | 6; 2 |
| 2 | (Dominican Republic) (Guatemala) | Glenny Cepeda; Luise-Elfride López | 5; 7 | 6; 3 | 3; 6 |
| 3 | (Dominican Republic) (Guatemala) | Glenny Cepeda / Carla Prieto; Luise-Elfride López / Mariola Prado | 6; 2 | 6; 4 |

== See also ==
- Fed Cup structure
