= 1999 Fed Cup Americas Zone Group II – Pool D =

Group D of the 1999 Fed Cup Americas Zone Group II was one of two pools in the Americas Zone Group II of the 1999 Fed Cup. Four teams competed in a round robin competition, with the top two teams advancing to the knockout stage.

	(Peru) PER	(Jamaica) JAM	(Bermuda) BER	(Antigua and Barbuda) ATG	RR; W–L	Set; W–L	Game; W–L	Standings
Peru		3–0	3–0	3–0	3–0	18–1	121–25	1
Jamaica	0–3		3–0	3–0	2–1	13–6	89–68	2
Bermuda	0–3	0–3		2–1	1–2	4–14	49–99	3
Antigua and Barbuda	0–3	0–3	1–2		0–3	2–16	43–100	4

== Peru vs. Antigua and Barbuda ==
Peru
3
Costa Rica Country Club, San José, Costa Rica
23 February 1999
Hard (outdoors)

Antigua and Barbuda
0

			1	2	3
1	(Peru) (Antigua and Barbuda)	Ariana Rojas; Niki Williams	6; 1	6; 3
2	(Peru) (Antigua and Barbuda)	Carla Rodríguez; Isoke Perry	6; 0	6; 0
3	(Peru) (Antigua and Barbuda)	Carla Rodríguez / Lorena Rodríguez di Laura; Francine Harvey / Niki Williams	6; 0	6; 0

== Jamaica vs. Bermuda ==
Jamaica
3
Costa Rica Country Club, San José, Costa Rica
23 February 1999
Hard (outdoors)

Bermuda
0

			1	2	3
1	(Jamaica) (Bermuda)	Alexandra Chong; Zarah De Silva	6; 1	6; 1
2	(Jamaica) (Bermuda)	Amira Samara; Danielle Paynter	6; 3	6; 4
3	(Jamaica) (Bermuda)	Alexandra Chong / Amira Samara; Anneliese Rose / Camille Sesanker	6; 2	7; 5

== Peru vs. Jamaica ==
Peru
3
Costa Rica Country Club, San José, Costa Rica
24 February 1999
Hard (outdoors)

Jamaica
0

			1	2	3
1	(Peru) (Jamaica)	Lorena Rodríguez di Laura; Tamara Davis	6; 3	6; 3
2	(Peru) (Jamaica)	Carla Rodríguez; Amira Samara	6; 2	6; 0
3	(Peru) (Jamaica)	Lorena Rodríguez di Laura / Ariana Rojas; Alexandra Chong / Amira Samara	3; 6	6; 1	6; 1

== Bermuda vs. Antigua and Barbuda ==
Bermuda
2
Costa Rica Country Club, San José, Costa Rica
24 February 1999
Hard (outdoors)

Antigua and Barbuda
1

			1	2	3
1	(Bermuda) (Antigua and Barbuda)	Tara Lambert; Niki Williams	3; 6	1; 6
2	(Bermuda) (Antigua and Barbuda)	Danielle Paynter; Isoke Perry	6; 4	6; 4
3	(Bermuda) (Antigua and Barbuda)	Tara Lambert / Danielle Paynter; Isoke Perry / Niki Williams	6; 4	6; 2

== Peru vs. Bermuda ==
Peru
3
Costa Rica Country Club, San José, Costa Rica
25 February 1999
Hard (outdoors)

Bermuda
0

			1	2	3
1	(Peru) (Bermuda)	Ariana Rojas; Tara Lambert	6; 1	6; 1
2	(Peru) (Bermuda)	Carla Rodríguez; Danielle Paynter	6; 0	6; 2
3	(Peru) (Bermuda)	Lorena Rodríguez di Laura / Ariana Rojas; Danielle Downey / Danielle Paynter	6; 1	6; 0

== Jamaica vs. Antigua and Barbuda ==
Jamaica
3
Costa Rica Country Club, San José, Costa Rica
25 February 1999
Hard (outdoors)

Antigua and Barbuda
0

			1	2	3
1	(Jamaica) (Antigua and Barbuda)	Alexandra Chong; Francine Harvey	6; 0	6; 3
2	(Jamaica) (Antigua and Barbuda)	Amira Samara; Niki Williams	6; 4	6; 2
3	(Jamaica) (Antigua and Barbuda)	Alexandra Chong / Amira Samara; Charisma Billings / Francine Harvey	6; 3	6; 1

== See also ==
- Fed Cup structure
