= 1999 Fed Cup Americas Zone Group I – Pool A =

International tennis competition

Group A of the 1999 Fed Cup Americas Zone Group I was one of two pools in the Americas Zone Group I of the 1999 Fed Cup. Five teams competed in a round robin competition, with the top team advancing to the Group I play-off, the winner of which would advance to World Group II Play-offs, and the bottom team being relegated down to 2000 Group II.

	(Argentina) ARG	(Colombia) COL	(Paraguay) PAR	(Mexico) MEX	(Ecuador) ECU	RR; W–L	Set; W–L	Game; W–L	Standings
Argentina		3–0	3–0	3–0	3–0	4–0	24–2	148–61	1
Colombia	0–3		3–0	3–0	3–0	3–1	18–6	129–76	2
Paraguay	0–3	0–3		2–1	2–1	2–2	8–18	99–124	3
Mexico	0–3	0–3	1–2		2–1	1–3	8–17	87–125	4
Ecuador	0–3	0–3	1–2	1–2		0–4	6–21	76–153	5

== Colombia vs. Mexico ==
Colombia
3
Buenos Aires T.C., Buenos Aires, Argentina
13 April 1999
Clay (outdoors)

Mexico
0

			1	2	3
1	(Colombia) (Mexico)	Catalina Castaño; Melissa Torres Sandoval	6; 3	6; 2
2	(Colombia) (Mexico)	Fabiola Zuluaga; Erika Valdés	6; 2	6; 4
3	(Colombia) (Mexico)	Mariana Mesa / Fabiola Zuluaga; Karin Palme / Graciela Vélez	6; 3	6; 4

== Paraguay vs. Ecuador ==
Paraguay
2
Buenos Aires T.C., Buenos Aires, Argentina
13 April 1999
Clay (outdoors)

Ecuador
1

			1	2	3
1	(Paraguay) (Ecuador)	Laura Bernal; María Dolores Campana	4; 6	6^{6} 7^{8}
2	(Paraguay) (Ecuador)	Larissa Schaerer; Nuria Niemes	6; 3	6; 0
3	(Paraguay) (Ecuador)	Laura Bernal / Larissa Schaerer; María Dolores Campana / Nuria Niemes	6^{6} 7^{8}	6; 1	6; 1

== Argentina vs. Mexico ==
Argentina
3
Buenos Aires T.C., Buenos Aires, Argentina
14 April 1999
Clay (outdoors)

Mexico
0

			1	2	3
1	(Argentina) (Mexico)	Mariana Díaz Oliva; Graciela Vélez	6; 2	6; 1
2	(Argentina) (Mexico)	Paola Suárez; Karin Palme	6; 1	6; 3
3	(Argentina) (Mexico)	Inés Gorrochategui / Patricia Tarabini; Karin Palme / Graciela Vélez	6; 1	6; 1

== Colombia vs. Ecuador ==
Colombia
3
Buenos Aires T.C., Buenos Aires, Argentina
14 April 1999
Clay (outdoors)

Ecuador
0

			1	2	3
1	(Colombia) (Ecuador)	Catalina Castaño; Myriam Cuevas	6; 4	6; 0
2	(Colombia) (Ecuador)	Fabiola Zuluaga; Paola Guerrero	6; 2	6; 0
3	(Colombia) (Ecuador)	Catalina Castaño / Fabiola Zuluaga; María Dolores Campana / Nuria Niemes	6; 1	6; 3

== Argentina vs. Paraguay ==
Argentina
3
Buenos Aires T.C., Buenos Aires, Argentina
15 April 1999
Clay (outdoors)

Paraguay
0

			1	2	3
1	(Argentina) (Paraguay)	Mariana Díaz Oliva; Laura Bernal	6; 0	6; 3
2	(Argentina) (Paraguay)	Paola Suárez; Larissa Schaerer	6; 2	6; 4
3	(Argentina) (Paraguay)	Inés Gorrochategui / Patricia Tarabini; Laura Bernal / Larissa Schaerer	6; 2	6; 4

== Mexico vs. Ecuador ==
Mexico
2
Buenos Aires T.C., Buenos Aires, Argentina
15 April 1999
Clay (outdoors)

Ecuador
1

			1	2	3
1	(Mexico) (Ecuador)	Erika Valdés; María Dolores Campana	7; 5	3; 6	2; 6
2	(Mexico) (Ecuador)	Karin Palme; Nuria Niemes	6; 2	6; 0
3	(Mexico) (Ecuador)	Karin Palme / Graciela Vélez; María Dolores Campana / Nuria Niemes	7^{7} 6^{4}	4; 6	6; 3

== Argentina vs. Ecuador ==
Argentina
3
Buenos Aires T.C., Buenos Aires, Argentina
16 April 1999
Clay (outdoors)

Ecuador
0

			1	2	3
1	(Argentina) (Ecuador)	Mariana Díaz Oliva; Myriam Cuevas	6; 1	6; 0
2	(Argentina) (Ecuador)	Paola Suárez; Paola Guerrero	6; 3	6; 1
3	(Argentina) (Ecuador)	Inés Gorrochategui / Patricia Tarabini; Myriam Cuevas / Paola Guerrero	6; 1	6; 1

== Colombia vs. Paraguay ==
Colombia
3
Buenos Aires T.C., Buenos Aires, Argentina
16 April 1999
Clay (outdoors)

Paraguay
0

			1	2	3
1	(Colombia) (Paraguay)	Catalina Castaño; Laura Bernal	6; 3	6; 2
2	(Colombia) (Paraguay)	Fabiola Zuluaga; Larissa Schaerer	6; 2	6; 4
3	(Colombia) (Paraguay)	Catalina Castaño / Mariana Mesa; Laura Bernal / Larissa Schaerer	6; 3	6; 4

== Argentina vs. Colombia ==
Argentina
3
Buenos Aires T.C., Buenos Aires, Argentina
17 April 1999
Clay (outdoors)

Colombia
0

			1	2	3
1	(Argentina) (Colombia)	Mariana Díaz Oliva; Catalina Castaño	0; 6	7; 5	7; 5
2	(Argentina) (Colombia)	Paola Suárez; Fabiola Zuluaga	2; 6	6; 4	6; 1
3	(Argentina) (Colombia)	Inés Gorrochategui / Patricia Tarabini; Catalina Castaño / Mariana Mesa	6; 2	6; 1

== Paraguay vs. Mexico ==
Paraguay
2
Buenos Aires T.C., Buenos Aires, Argentina
17 April 1999
Clay (outdoors)

Mexico
1

			1	2	3
1	(Paraguay) (Mexico)	Laura Bernal; Erika Valdés	6; 2	1; 6	3; 6
2	(Paraguay) (Mexico)	Larissa Schaerer; Karin Palme	6; 1	6; 4
3	(Paraguay) (Mexico)	Mónica Acosta / María Alejandra García; Karin Palme / Graciela Vélez	6; 2	6; 0

- Ecuador failed to win any ties in the pool, and thus was relegated to Group II in 2000, where they placed first overall, and thus advanced back to Group I for 2001.

== See also ==
- Fed Cup structure
