= 1991 Federation Cup (tennis) =

International women's tennis competition

Details
- Duration: 18 – 28 July
- Edition: 29th

Champion
- Winning nation: Spain

The 1991 Federation Cup was the 29th edition of the most important competition between national teams in women's tennis. The tournament was held at the Nottingham Tennis Centre in Nottingham, United Kingdom from 18–28 July. Spain defeated the United States in the final (in what was a rematch of the 1989 Federation Cup final), giving Spain its first title.

== World Group Qualifying ==
First Round
Paraguay	3
Jamaica	0
Philippines	1
Chile	2
Trinidad and Tobago	0
Malta	3
Ireland	1
Greece	2
Malaysia	0
Mexico	3
Sri Lanka	0
Denmark	3
Portugal	3
Bahamas	0
Chinese Taipei	3
Dominican Republic	0

Qualifying Round
Paraguay	2
Chile	1
Malta	1
Greece	2
Mexico	0
Denmark	3
Portugal	2
Chinese Taipei	1

First Round
Romania	2
Thailand	1
Cuba	3
India	0
Luxembourg	3
Bolivia	0
Norway	1
China	2
Israel	2
South Korea	1
Hong Kong	0
Venezuela	3
Uruguay	3
Turkey	0
Kenya	0
Poland	3

Qualifying Round
Romania	3
Cuba	0
Luxembourg	1
China	2
Israel	3
Venezuela	0
Uruguay	0
Poland	3

Winning nations advanced to World Group, nations that lost in the first round played in consolation rounds.

== World Group ==
Participating Teams
Argentina	Australia	Austria	Belgium	Brazil	Bulgaria	Canada	China
Czechoslovakia	Denmark	Finland	France	Germany	Great Britain	Greece	Hungary
Indonesia	Israel	Italy	Japan	Netherlands	New Zealand	Paraguay	Poland
Portugal	Romania	Soviet Union	Spain	Sweden	Switzerland	United States	Yugoslavia

=== Draw ===
First Round; 22–23 July
United States	2
Netherlands	0
Hungary	0
Bulgaria	3
Finland	3
Q	Romania	0
Q	Portugal	0
Austria	3
Switzerland	2
Argentina	0
Brazil	0
Q	China	3
Czechoslovakia	2
Sweden	0
Q	Paraguay	0
Soviet Union	3
Great Britain	2
New Zealand	0
Q	Israel	1
Italy	2
Canada	2
Q	Denmark	1
Q	Greece	0
Germany	3
France	1
Q	Poland	2
Yugoslavia	0
Indonesia	3
Australia	2
Japan	1
Belgium	0
Spain	2

Second Round; 24 July
United States	3
Bulgaria	0
Finland	1
Austria	2
Switzerland	2
Q	China	1
Czechoslovakia	2
Soviet Union	1
Great Britain	0
Italy	2
Canada	1
Germany	2
Q	Poland	1
Indonesia	2
Australia	0
Spain	3

Quarterfinals; 25–26 July
United States	2
Austria	1
Switzerland	1
Czechoslovakia	2
Italy	1
Germany	2
Indonesia	0
Spain	2

Semifinals; 27 July
United States	3
Czechoslovakia	0
Germany	0
Spain	3

Final; 28 July
United States	1
Spain	2

== World Group play-offs ==
The sixteen losing teams in the World Group first round ties played off against each other in the first round. The losing teams then went to play-off again, with those that lost twice being relegated to Zonal Competition in 1992.

Repechage Round; 24–25 July
Brazil	1
Paraguay	2
Portugal	0
Hungary	2
Greece	0
New Zealand	2
Belgium	3
Yugoslavia	0

First Round; 25–26 July
Brazil	1
Argentina	2
Sweden	3
Paraguay	0
Romania	2
Portugal	0
Netherlands	2
Hungary	0
Denmark	2
Greece	1
Israel	2
New Zealand	0
Japan	2
Belgium	1
France	2
Yugoslavia	0

== Consolation Rounds ==
First Round; 19–20 July
South Korea	3
Hong Kong	0
Bolivia	1
Norway	2
Thailand	3
India	0
Turkey	3
Kenya	0
Jamaica	1
Philippines	2
Malaysia	0
Sri Lanka	3
Bahamas	1
Dominican Republic	2
Trinidad and Tobago	0
Ireland	3

Quarterfinals; 21 July
South Korea	1
Norway	2
Thailand	3
Turkey	0
Philippines	2
Sri Lanka	1
Dominican Republic	1
Ireland	2

Semifinals; 22 July
Norway	3
Thailand	0
Philippines	1
Ireland	2

Final; 23 July
Norway	2
Ireland	1
