= 1999 Fed Cup Americas Zone Group II – Pool C =

Group C of the 1999 Fed Cup Americas Zone Group II was one of two pools in the Americas Zone Group II of the 1999 Fed Cup. Four teams competed in a round robin competition, with the top two teams advancing to the knockout stage.

	(Bolivia) BOL	(Barbados) BAR	(Trinidad and Tobago) TRI	(Panama) PAN	RR; W–L	Set; W–L	Game; W–L	Standings
Bolivia		3–0	3–0	3–0	3–0	18–1	114–57	1
Barbados	0–3		2–1	2–1	1–2	8–12	81–87	2
Trinidad and Tobago	0–3	1–2		2–1	1–2	10–12	100–113	3
Panama	0–3	1–2	1–2		1–2	5–17	82–121	4

== Bolivia vs. Trinidad and Tobago ==
Bolivia
3
Costa Rica Country Club, San José, Costa Rica
23 February 1999
Hard (outdoors)

Trinidad and Tobago
0

			1	2	3
1	(Bolivia) (Trinidad and Tobago)	Daniela Álvarez; Camille Sesanker	6; 3	6; 0
2	(Bolivia) (Trinidad and Tobago)	Mónica Poveda; Anneliese Rose	3; 6	7^{10} 6^{8}	8; 6
3	(Bolivia) (Trinidad and Tobago)	Eunice Paravicini / Viviana Rivero; Nisha Naraynsingh / Leeza Rooks	6; 1	6; 2

== Barbados vs. Panama ==
Barbados
2
Costa Rica Country Club, San José, Costa Rica
23 February 1999
Hard (outdoors)

Panama
1

			1	2	3
1	(Barbados) (Panama)	Tricia-Ann Greaves; Karla Hall González	6; 0	6; 2
2	(Barbados) (Panama)	Richele Le Saldo; Anabelle Espinosa Rodríguez	2; 6	6; 3	2; 6
3	(Barbados) (Panama)	Tricia-Ann Greaves / Richele Le Saldo; Anabelle Espinosa Rodríguez / Yimara Figueroa	6; 2	6; 3

== Bolivia vs. Barbados ==
Bolivia
3
Costa Rica Country Club, San José, Costa Rica
24 February 1999
Hard (outdoors)

Barbados
0

			1	2	3
1	(Bolivia) (Barbados)	Daniela Álvarez; Tricia-Ann Greaves	6; 4	6; 4
2	(Bolivia) (Barbados)	Mónica Poveda; Richele Le Saldo	6; 3	6; 0
3	(Bolivia) (Barbados)	Eunice Paravicini / Viviana Rivero; Kim Brandford / Donna Fields-Gibbs	6; 3	6; 3

== Trinidad and Tobago vs. Panama ==
Trinidad and Tobago
2
Costa Rica Country Club, San José, Costa Rica
24 February 1999
Hard (outdoors)

Panama
1

			1	2	3
1	(Trinidad and Tobago) (Panama)	Camille Sesanker; Lilly Cal Fong	6; 1	4; 6	6; 4
2	(Trinidad and Tobago) (Panama)	Anneliese Rose; Anabelle Espinosa Rodríguez	6^{4} 7^{7}	6; 1	9; 11
3	(Trinidad and Tobago) (Panama)	Anneliese Rose / Camille Sesanker; Anabelle Espinosa Rodríguez / Karla Hall González	7; 5	7^{7} 6^{1}

== Bolivia vs. Panama ==
Bolivia
3
Costa Rica Country Club, San José, Costa Rica
25 February 1999
Hard (outdoors)

Panama
0

			1	2	3
1	(Bolivia) (Panama)	Daniela Álvarez; Lilly Cal Fong	6; 3	6; 4
2	(Bolivia) (Panama)	Mónica Poveda; Anabelle Espinosa Rodríguez	6; 3	6; 3
3	(Bolivia) (Panama)	Daniela Álvarez / Mónica Poveda; Yimara Figueroa / Karla Hall González	6; 3	6; 0

== Barbados vs. Trinidad and Tobago ==
Barbados
2
Costa Rica Country Club, San José, Costa Rica
25 February 1999
Hard (outdoors)

Trinidad and Tobago
1

			1	2	3
1	(Barbados) (Trinidad and Tobago)	Tricia-Ann Greaves; Camille Sesanker	6; 0	6; 0
2	(Barbados) (Trinidad and Tobago)	Richele Le Saldo; Anneliese Rose	1; 6	2; 6
3	(Barbados) (Trinidad and Tobago)	Kim Brandford / Richele Le Saldo; Anneliese Rose / Camille Sesanker	6; 3	3; 6	6; 4

== See also ==
- Fed Cup structure
