= Melisa Arévalo =

Argentine tennis player

- Country (sports): Argentina
- Born: 9 January 1980 (age 46)
- Prize money: $63,232

Singles
- Career record: 184–148
- Career titles: 4 ITF
- Highest ranking: No. 268 (17 July 2000)

Doubles
- Career record: 156–111
- Career titles: 15 ITF
- Highest ranking: No. 240 (26 November 2001)

Melisa Arévalo (born 9 January 1980) is an Argentine former professional tennis player.

Arévalo won 19 ITF tournaments during her career, four in singles and 15 in doubles. She made two WTA Tour main-draw appearances, both in doubles, at the 1999 Copa Colsanitas and the 2002 Casablanca Grand Prix.

== ITF Circuit finals ==
Legend
$40,000 tournaments
$25,000 tournaments
$10,000 tournaments

=== Singles: 10 (4–6) ===
Result	No.	Date	Tournament	Surface	Opponent	Score
Win	1.	23 August 1998	ITF Ibarra, Ecuador	Clay	(Uruguay) Daniela Olivera	6–4, 6–1
Win	2.	6 September 1998	ITF Guayaquil, Ecuador	Clay	(Argentina) Natalia Gussoni	3–6, 6–3, 6–3
Loss	1.	29 August 1999	ITF La Paz, Bolivia	Clay	(Colombia) Mariana Mesa	1–6, 4–6
Loss	2.	12 September 1999	ITF Buenos Aires, Argentina	Clay	(Paraguay) Rossana de los Ríos	0–6, 2–6
Win	3.	2 April 2000	ITF Santiago, Chile	Clay	(Brazil) Miriam D'Agostini	6–3, 6–3
Loss	3.	15 May 2000	ITF Poza Rica, Mexico	Hard	(Uruguay) Daniela Olivera	1–6, 4–6
Loss	4.	12 August 2001	ITF Lima, Peru	Clay	(Brazil) Carla Tiene	3–6, 4–6
Loss	5.	26 August 2001	ITF Buenos Aires, Argentina	Clay	(Argentina) Natalia Gussoni	4–6, 0–6
Win	4.	11 November 2001	ITF San Salvador, El Salvador	Clay	(Brazil) Carla Tiene	2–6, 6–3, 6–2
Loss	6.	17 February 2002	ITF Matamoros, Mexico	Hard	(Hungary) Melinda Czink	2–6, 3–6

=== Doubles: 32 (15–17) ===
Result	No.	Date	Tournament	Surface	Partner	Opponents	Score
Win	1.	6 April 1998	ITF Viña del Mar, Chile	Clay	(Argentina) Daniela Muscolino	(Chile) Paula Cabezas (Argentina) Celeste Contín	6–3, 6–4
Win	2.	31 August 1998	ITF Guayaquil, Ecuador	Clay	(Argentina) Florencia Basile	(Uruguay) Elena Juricich (Peru) María Eugenia Rojas	6–2, 6–2
Win	3.	4 April 1999	ITF Santiago, Chile	Clay	(Argentina) Jorgelina Tor	(Paraguay) Laura Bernal (Argentina) Paula Racedo	6–4, 4–6, 6–4
Win	4.	9 May 1999	Verona, Italy	Clay	(Argentina) Sabrina Valenti	(Slovenia) Maja Matevžič (Federal Republic of Yugoslavia) Dragana Ilić	7–6, 7–6
Loss	1.	23 May 1999	Zaragoza, Spain	Clay	(Argentina) Jorgelina Torti	(Spain) Lourdes Domínguez Lino (Colombia) Mariana Mesa	w/o
Win	5.	2 August 1999	Caracas, Venezuela	Hard	(Colombia) Mariana Mesa	(Slovakia) Gabriela Voleková (Switzerland) Aliénor Tricerri	7–5, 7–6^{(1)}
Win	6.	23 August 1999	La Paz, Bolivia	Clay	(Colombia) Mariana Mesa	(Portugal) Helga Vieira (Brazil) Ana Paula Novaes	6–1, 6–4
Loss	2.	15 November 1999	Campos, Brazil	Clay	(Argentina) Jorgelina Torti	(Italy) Alice Canepa (Argentina) Paula Racedo	7–5, 4–6, 1–6
Loss	3.	2 April 2000	Santiago, Chile	Clay	(Argentina) Paula Racedo	(Brazil) Miriam D'Agostini (Argentina) Jorgelina Torti	3–6, 6–7^{(3)}
Loss	4.	27 August 2000	Buenos Aires, Argentina	Clay	(Argentina) Paula Racedo	(Argentina) Geraldine Aizenberg (Argentina) Luciana Masante	2–6, 2–6
Win	7.	3 September 2000	Buenos Aires, Argentina	Clay	(Argentina) Paula Racedo	(Paraguay) Larissa Schaerer (Colombia) Mariana Mesa	6–3, 7–5
Win	8.	5 March 2001	Saltillo, Mexico	Hard	(Spain) Conchita Martínez Granados	(United States) Courtenay Chapman (United States) Melissa Middleton	7–6^{(3)}, 0–6, 6–1
Loss	5.	26 March 2001	Ciudad Victoria, Mexico	Hard	(Spain) Conchita Martínez Granados	(Uruguay) Daniela Olivera (Argentina) Luciana Masante	4–6, 5–7
Win	9.	14 May 2001	Turin, Italy	Clay	(Brazil) Vanessa Menga	(Uruguay) Daniela Olivera (Argentina) Luciana Masante	7–5, 6–2
Loss	6.	25 June 2001	Fontanafredda, Italy	Clay	(Argentina) Natalia Gussoni	(Brazil) Joana Cortez (Brazil) Vanessa Menga	3–6, 3–6
Win	10.	8 July 2001	Camaiore, Italy	Clay	(South Africa) Nicole Rencken	(Croatia) Petra Dizdar (Croatia) Mia Marovic	4–5 ret.
Loss	7.	22 July 2001	São José dos Campos, Brazil	Hard	(Brazil) Vanessa Menga	(Brazil) Carla Tiene (Brazil) Bruna Colósio	3–6, 5–7
Win	11.	19 August 2001	La Paz, Bolivia	Clay	(Brazil) Carla Tiene	(Bolivia) Daniela Álvarez (Uruguay) Ana Lucía Migliarini de León	4–2 ret.
Loss	8.	26 August 2001	Paraná, Argentina	Clay	(Argentina) Natalia Gussoni	(Argentina) Jorgelina Cravero (Argentina) Erica Krauth	2–6, 3–6
Loss	9.	30 September 2001	São Paulo, Brazil	Hard	(Argentina) Jorgelina Cravero	(Brazil) Carla Tiene (Brazil) Vanessa Menga	3–6, 1–6
Win	12.	29 January 2002	Saltillo, Mexico	Hard	(Brazil) Vanessa Menga	(Uruguay) Daniela Olivera (Germany) Caroline-Ann Basu	4–6, 6–4, 7–5
Loss	10.	11 February 2002	Matamoros, Mexico	Hard	(Brazil) Vanessa Menga	(Brazil) Carla Tiene (Argentina) Jorgelina Cravero	2–6, 6–2, 5–7
Loss	11.	18 February 2002	Ciudad Victoria, Mexico	Hard	(Brazil) Vanessa Menga	(Brazil) Carla Tiene (Argentina) Jorgelina Cravero	2–6, 5–7
Win	13.	10 April 2002	Monterrey, Mexico	Hard	(Brazil) Vanessa Menga	(Russia) Olga Kalyuzhnaya (Brazil) Maria Fernanda Alves	6–2, 6–1
Loss	12.	13 May 2002	Casale Monferrato, Italy	Clay	(Argentina) Erica Krauth	(Australia) Melissa Dowse (Australia) Rochelle Rosenfield	6–3, 6–7^{(5)}, 1–6
Loss	13.	27 May 2002	Campobasso, Italy	Clay	(Argentina) Natalia Gussoni	(Germany) Caroline-Ann Basu (Uruguay) Daniela Olivera	4–6, 5–7
Win	14.	10 March 2003	Matamoros, Mexico	Hard	(Brazil) Maria Fernanda Alves	(Brazil) Carla Tiene (Brazil) Joana Cortez	6–0, 7–5
Loss	14.	16 June 2003	ITF Poza Rica, Mexico	Hard	(Brazil) Maria Fernanda Alves	(Brazil) Carla Tiene (Argentina) Florencia Rivolta	3–6, 3–6
Loss	15.	30 June 2003	ITF Monterrey, Mexico	Hard	(Argentina) Micaela Moran	(Brazil) Carla Tiene (Brazil) Maria Fernanda Alves	6–7^{(7)}, 2–6
Loss	16.	14 July 2003	ITF Campos, Brazil	Hard	(Portugal) Frederica Piedade	(Brazil) Carla Tiene (Brazil) Maria Fernanda Alves	6–7, 2–6
Loss	17.	28 September 2003	ITF Aguascalientes, Mexico	Clay	(Brazil) Larissa Carvalho	(Brazil) Carla Tiene (Brazil) Marcela Evangelista	3–6, 6–2, 2–6
Win	15.	27 October 2003	ITF Obregón, Mexico	Clay	(France) Kildine Chevalier	(Uruguay) Ana Lucía Migliarini de León (Mexico) Daniela Múñoz Gallegos	1–6, 6–2, 6–4
