= 1999 Fed Cup Americas Zone Group I – Pool B =

Regional competition in the 1999 Fed Cup

Group B of the 1999 Fed Cup Americas Zone Group I was one of two pools in the Americas Zone Group I of the 1999 Fed Cup. Five teams competed in a round robin competition, with the top team advancing to the Group I play-off, the winner of which would advance to World Group II Play-offs, and the bottom team being relegated down to 2000 Group II.

	(Venezuela) VEN	(Canada) CAN	(Brazil) BRA	(Chile) CHI	(Puerto Rico) PUR	RR; W–L	Set; W–L	Game; W–L	Standings
Venezuela		2–1	3–0	2–1	3–0	4–0	20–5	136–84	1
Canada	1–2		2–1	3–0	3–0	3–1	19–6	139–71	2
Brazil	0–3	1–2		2–1	3–0	2–2	13–14	118–117	3
Chile	1–2	0–3	1–2		3–0	1–3	11–15	95–126	4
Puerto Rico	0–3	0–3	0–3	0–3		0–4	1–24	62–152	5

== Venezuela vs. Puerto Rico ==
Venezuela
3
Buenos Aires T.C., Buenos Aires, Argentina
13 April 1999
Red clay (outdoors)

Puerto Rico
0

			1	2	3
1	(Venezuela) (Puerto Rico)	Milagros Sequera; Mari Toró	6; 1	6; 4
2	(Venezuela) (Puerto Rico)	María Vento; Vilmarie Castellvi	6; 1	6; 3
3	(Venezuela) (Puerto Rico)	Milagros Sequera / María Vento; Vilmarie Castellvi / Mari Toró	6; 2	6; 1

== Brazil vs. Chile ==
Brazil
2
Buenos Aires T.C., Buenos Aires, Argentina
13 April 1999
Red clay (outdoors)

Chile
1

			1	2	3
1	(Brazil) (Chile)	Miriam D'Agostini; Bárbara Castro	1; 6	3; 6
2	(Brazil) (Chile)	Vanessa Menga; Karem Harboe	6; 0	3; 6	6; 3
3	(Brazil) (Chile)	Joana Cortez / Vanessa Menga; Bárbara Castro / María-Alejandra Quezada	6; 0	6; 1

== Canada vs. Chile ==
Canada
3
Buenos Aires T.C., Buenos Aires, Argentina
14 April 1999
Red clay (outdoors)

Chile
0

			1	2	3
1	(Canada) (Chile)	Martina Nejedly; Bárbara Castro	6; 2	6; 0
2	(Canada) (Chile)	Sonya Jeyaseelan; Karem Harboe	6; 2	6; 0
3	(Canada) (Chile)	Renata Kolbovic / Sonya Jeyaseelan; Valentina Castro / María-Alejandra Quezada	6; 1	6; 1

== Brazil vs. Puerto Rico ==
Brazil
3
Buenos Aires T.C., Buenos Aires, Argentina
14 April 1999
Red clay (outdoors)

Puerto Rico
0

			1	2	3
1	(Brazil) (Puerto Rico)	Miriam D'Agostini; Mari Toró	6; 3	6; 1
2	(Brazil) (Puerto Rico)	Vanessa Menga; Vilmarie Castellvi	6; 3	7; 5
3	(Brazil) (Puerto Rico)	Joana Cortez / Vanessa Menga; Vilmarie Castellvi / Mari Toró	6; 1	6; 1

== Venezuela vs. Canada ==
Venezuela
2
Buenos Aires T.C., Buenos Aires, Argentina
15 April 1999
Red clay (outdoors)

Canada
1

			1	2	3
1	(Venezuela) (Canada)	Milagros Sequera; Martina Nejedly	6; 4	6; 3
2	(Venezuela) (Canada)	María Vento; Sonya Jeyaseelan	6; 4	6; 3
3	(Venezuela) (Canada)	Stephanie Schaer / Fabiana Taverna; Renata Kolbovic / Martina Nejedly	0; 6	0; 6

== Chile vs. Puerto Rico ==
Chile
3
Buenos Aires T.C., Buenos Aires, Argentina
15 April 1999
Red clay (outdoors)

Puerto Rico
0

			1	2	3
1	(Chile) (Puerto Rico)	Bárbara Castro; Mari Toró	6; 3	6; 1
2	(Chile) (Puerto Rico)	Karem Harboe; Vilmarie Castellvi	5; 7	7; 5	7; 5
3	(Chile) (Puerto Rico)	Valentina Castro / María-Alejandra Quezada; Joanne Bauzà / Mari Toró	6; 0	6; 2

== Venezuela vs. Brazil ==
Venezuela
3
Buenos Aires T.C., Buenos Aires, Argentina
16 April 1999
Red clay (outdoors)

Brazil
0

			1	2	3
1	(Venezuela) (Brazil)	Milagros Sequera; Miriam D'Agostini	3; 6	6; 4	7; 5
2	(Venezuela) (Brazil)	María Vento; Vanessa Menga	6; 3	6; 2
3	(Venezuela) (Brazil)	Milagros Sequera / María Vento; Joana Cortez / Carla Tiene	6; 1	6; 1

== Canada vs. Puerto Rico ==
Canada
3
Buenos Aires T.C., Buenos Aires, Argentina
16 April 1999
Red clay (outdoors)

Puerto Rico
0

			1	2	3
1	(Canada) (Puerto Rico)	Renata Kolbovic; Mari Toró	6; 3	6; 2
2	(Canada) (Puerto Rico)	Sonya Jeyaseelan; Vilmarie Castellvi	6; 3	6; 4
3	(Canada) (Puerto Rico)	Renata Kolbovic / Martina Nejedly; Joanne Bauzà / Olga Nin	6; 1	6; 0

== Venezuela vs. Chile ==
Venezuela
2
Buenos Aires T.C., Buenos Aires, Argentina
17 April 1999
Red clay (outdoors)

Chile
1

			1	2	3
1	(Venezuela) (Chile)	Milagros Sequera; Bárbara Castro	6; 1	6; 4
2	(Venezuela) (Chile)	María Vento; Karem Harboe	7; 5	7^{7} 6^{3}
3	(Venezuela) (Chile)	Stephanie Schaer / Fabiana Taverna; Valentina Castro / María-Alejandra Quezada	5; 7	5; 7

== Canada vs. Brazil ==
Canada
2
Buenos Aires T.C., Buenos Aires, Argentina
17 April 1999
Red clay (outdoors)

Brazil
1

			1	2	3
1	(Canada) (Brazil)	Martina Nejedly; Carla Tiene	6; 4	6^{3} 7^{7}	5; 7
2	(Canada) (Brazil)	Sonya Jeyaseelan; Joana Cortez	6; 2	6; 1
3	(Canada) (Brazil)	Sonya Jeyaseelan / Renata Kolbovic; Joana Cortez / Carla Tiene	6; 3	6; 4

- Puerto Rico failed to win any ties in the pool, and thus was relegated to Group II in 2000, where they placed fourth overall.

== See also ==
- Fed Cup structure
