= Caroline-Ann Basu =

German tennis player

- Country (sports): Germany
- Born: 11 July 1983 (age 41); Wolfsburg, Germany
- Retired: 2004
- Plays: Right-handed
- Prize money: $24,888

Singles
- Career record: 91–91
- Highest ranking: No. 396 (15 September 2003)

Grand Slam singles results
- French Open Junior: 1R (1999)
- Wimbledon Junior: 1R (1999)

Doubles
- Career record: 71–75
- Career titles: 4 ITF
- Highest ranking: No. 270 (14 April 2003)

Grand Slam doubles results
- French Open Junior: 1R (1999)
- Last updated on: 9 March 2024.

Caroline-Ann Basu (born 11 July 1983) is a former professional tennis player from Germany.

Basu has a career high WTA singles ranking of 396 achieved on 15 September 2003. She also has a career high WTA doubles ranking of 270 achieved on 14 April 2003.

Partnering Kildine Chevalier, Basu won her first $40k tournament in March 2003 at the ITF Monterrey in Mexico.

Basu played college tennis in the USA. She played for the Georgia Bulldogs of University of Georgia.Basu was born in Wolfsburg Her mother and father are doctors. She has two brothers and can speak five languages.

In 1999 she won the Junior tournament Copa del Cafe in San José, Costa Rica.

== ITF Circuit finals ==
=== Singles: 2 (0 titles, 2 runner-up) ===
Legend W40 tournaments W10 tournaments	Finals by surface Hard (0–2)

Result	W–L	Date	Tournament	Tier	Surface	Opponent	Score
Loss	0–1	Feb 2003	ITF Vale do Lobo, Portugal	W10	Hard	(Belarus) Anastasiya Yakimova	3–6, 1–6
Loss	0–2	Mar 2003	ITF Nuevo Laredo, Mexico	W40	Hard	(Romania) Liana Ungur	6–7^{(4)}, 2–6

=== Doubles: 10 (4 titles, 6 runner-up) ===
Legend W40 tournaments W10 tournaments	Finals by surface Hard (3–3) Clay (1–3)

Result	W–L	Date	Tournament	Tier	Surface	Partner	Opponents	Score
Loss	0–1	Oct 2000	ITF Lerida, Spain	W10	Clay	(Serbia) Ana Timotić	(Spain) Patricia Aznar (Spain) Bárbara Navarro	1–6, 3–6
Loss	0–2	Jan 2002	ITF Saltillo, Mexico	W40	Hard	(Uruguay) Daniela Olivera	(Argentina) Melisa Arévalo (Brazil) Vanessa Menga	6–4, 4–6, 5–7
Loss	0–3	Mar 2002	ITF Rome, Italy	W10	Clay	(Estonia) Margit Rüütel	(Italy) Claudia Ivone (Italy) Flavia Pennetta	3–6, 4–6
Win	1–3	May 2002	ITF Campobasso, Italy	W10	Clay	(Uruguay) Daniela Olivera	(Argentina) Melisa Arévalo (Argentina) Natalia Gussoni	6–4, 7–5
Win	2–3	Aug 2002	ITF Vigo, Spain	W10	Hard	(France) Kildine Chevalier	(Spain) Laura Figuerola (Spain) María Pilar Sánchez Alayeto	6–2, 6–1
Win	3–3	Sep 2002	ITF Mollerussa, Spain	W10	Hard	(France) Kildine Chevalier	(Spain) Núria Roig (Spain) Laura Vallverdu-Zaira	6–3, 3–6, 7–6^{(5)}
Loss	3–4	Sep 2002	ITF Lleida, Spain	W10	Clay	(Switzerland) Aliénor Tricerri	(Portugal) Frederica Piedade (Portugal) Neuza Silva	7–6^{(5)}, 2–6, 4–6
Loss	3–5	Mar 2003	ITF Nuevo Laredo, Mexico	W40	Hard	(France) Kildine Chevalier	(United Kingdom) Helen Crook (Greece) Christina Zachariadou	3–6, 6–4, 2–6
Loss	3–6	Mar 2003	ITF Matamoros, Mexico	W40	Hard	(France) Kildine Chevalier	(United Kingdom) Helen Crook (Greece) Christina Zachariadou	2–6, 0–6
Win	4–6	Mar 2003	ITF Monterrey, Mexico	W40	Hard	(France) Kildine Chevalier	(Brazil) Joana Cortez (Brazil) Carla Tiene	6–4, 3–6, 7–5
