= María Eugenia Rojas (tennis) =

Peruvian tennis player (born 1977)

- Country (sports): Peru
- Born: 27 December 1977 (age 47)
- Height: 168 cm (5 ft 6 in)
- Prize money: $15,775

Singles
- Career titles: 0
- Highest ranking: No. 504 (2 February 1998)

Doubles
- Career titles: 1 ITF
- Highest ranking: No. 336 (11 May 1998)

María Eugenia Rojas (born 27 December 1977) is a Peruvian former professional tennis player.

Rojas competed on the professional tour in the 1990s and reached a best singles ranking of 504 in the world. Between 1995 and 1998, Rojas represented the Peru Fed Cup team in a total of 13 ties, winning six singles and five doubles matches. Her only professional title came in 1998, when she partnered with Uruguay's Elena Juricich to win an ITF doubles tournament in Nuevo Laredo.

== ITF finals ==
=== Doubles (1–7) ===
| Legend $25,000 tournaments $10,000 tournaments | Finals by surface Hard (0–6) Clay (1–1) |

| Result | No. | Date | Tournament | Surface | Partner | Opponents | Score |
|---|---|---|---|---|---|---|---|
| Loss | 1. | 26 September 1994 | Lima, Peru | Clay | (Peru) Laura Arraya | (Brazil) Luciana Tella (Brazil) Vanessa Menga | 4–6, 3–6 |
| Loss | 2. | 15 September 1996 | Buenos Aires, Argentina | Clay | (Brazil) Renata Brito | (Argentina) Celeste Contín (Argentina) Romina Ottoboni | 4–6, 6–4, 6–7 |
| Loss | 3. | 1 June 1997 | San Salvador, El Salvador | Clay | (Israel) Jacquelyn Rosen | (Argentina) Cintia Tortorella (Brazil) Miriam D'Agostini | 4–6, 0–6 |
| Loss | 4. | 7 September 1997 | Lima, Peru | Clay | (Israel) Jacquelyn Rosen | (Argentina) Romina Ottoboni (Argentina) Paula Racedo | 0–6, 4–6 |
| Win | 1. | 9 March 1998 | Nuevo Laredo, Mexico | Hard | (Uruguay) Elena Juricich | (Japan) Hiromi Bethard (Canada) Ioana Plesu | 6–3, 6–4 |
| Loss | 5. | 17 August 1998 | Ibarra, Ecuador | Clay | (Uruguay) Elena Juricich | (Chile) Paula Cabezas (United Kingdom) Joanne Moore | 3–6, 4–6 |
| Loss | 6. | 31 August 1998 | Guayaquil, Ecuador | Clay | (Uruguay) Elena Juricich | (Argentina) Florencia Basile (Argentina) Melisa Arévalo | 2–6, 2–6 |
| Loss | 7. | 15 March 1999 | Victoria, Mexico | Hard | (United States) Kylene Wong Simunyola | (Cuba) Yamilé Córdova (Cuba) Yoannis Montesino | 6–1, 6–7^{(6–8)}, 0–6 |
