= Alanna Broderick =

Jamaican tennis player

- Country (sports): Jamaica
- Born: 18 August 1980 (age 46) Kingston, Jamaica
- Turned pro: 2002
- Retired: 2014
- Plays: Right-handed (one-handed backhand)
- Prize money: $6,145

Singles
- Career record: 9–22
- Career titles: 0
- Highest ranking: No. 724 (1 November 2004)

Doubles
- Career record: 38–29
- Career titles: 4 ITF
- Highest ranking: No. 364 (15 November 2004)

Alanna Aimee Broderick (born 18 August 1980) is a retired Jamaican tennis player. She was born in Kingston, Jamaica to John Broderick and Kerry Broderick. In High School, she studied marketing.

Broderick won four doubles titles on the ITF Circuit. Her career-high WTA singles ranking is No. 724, which she reached on 1 November 2004. Her career high doubles ranking is world No. 364, which she reached on 15 November 2004.

Playing for Jamaica Fed Cup team, Broderick has a win–loss record of 17–12.

She now lives in Westport, Connecticut with her husband, Chris.

== ITF finals ==
=== Doubles (4–2) ===
Legend $100,000 tournaments $75,000 tournaments $50,000 tournaments $25,000 tournaments $10,000 tournaments	Finals by surface Hard (4–2) Clay (0–0) Grass (0–0) Carpet (0–0)

Result	Date	Category	Tournament	Surface	Partner	Opponents	Score
Winner	30 June 2003	10,000	ITF Waco, United States	Hard	(United States) Ahsha Rolle	(Germany) Kim Niggemeyer (Argentina) Cintia Tortorella	7–6^{(7)}, 6–2
Winner	7 March 2004	10,000	ITF Benin City, Nigeria	Hard	(South Africa) Chanelle Scheepers	(Czech Republic) Zuzana Černá (Germany) Franziska Etzel	6–2, 6–2
Winner	7 June 2004	10,000	ITF Alcobaça, Portugal	Hard	(United States) Megan Moulton-Levy	(Italy) Krizia Borgarello (Italy) Silvia Disderi	7–5, 6–1
Runner-up	14 June 2004	10,000	ITF Montemor-o-Novo, Portugal	Hard	(United States) Megan Moulton-Levy	(Portugal) Frederica Piedade (Switzerland) Aliénor Tricerri	6–4, 6–3
Winner	22 October 2004	10,000	ITF Lagos, Nigeria	Hard	(South Africa) Surina De Beer	(Israel) Yevgenia Savranska (Switzerland) Karin Schlapbach	7–5, 6–2
Runner-up	30 October 2004	10,000	ITF Lagos, Nigeria	Hard	(South Africa) Surina De Beer	(Germany) Franziska Etzel (Austria) Jennifer Schmidt	5–7, 2–6
