= Laura Bernal (tennis) =

Paraguayan tennis player

- Country (sports): Paraguay
- Born: 27 January 1978 (age 47)
- Prize money: $10,051

Singles
- Career record: 35–28
- Career titles: 1 ITF
- Highest ranking: No. 478 (28 September 1998)

Doubles
- Career record: 39–29
- Career titles: 3 ITF
- Highest ranking: No. 287 (9 November 1998)

Team competitions
- Fed Cup: 17–14

Laura Bernal (born 27 January 1978) is a Paraguayan former professional tennis player.

Bernal represented the Paraguay Fed Cup team in a total of 20 ties from 1996 to 2001. She reached a best singles ranking of 478 on the professional tour, winning an ITF tournament in La Paz in 1998. As a doubles player, she won a further three ITF titles and was ranked as high as 287 in the world.

== ITF finals ==
=== Singles (1–0) ===
Result	No.	Date	Tournament	Surface	Opponent	Score
Win	1.	14 September 1998	ITF La Paz, Bolivia	Clay	(Portugal) Helga Vieira	6–4, 6–2

=== Doubles (3–4) ===
Result	No.	Date	Tournament	Surface	Partner	Opponents	Score
Loss	1.	9 October 1995	ITF La Paz, Bolivia	Clay	(Argentina) Paula Racedo	(Sweden) Maria-Farnes Capistrano (Finland) Linda Jansson	5–7, 2–6
Loss	2.	6 October 1997	ITF Montevideo, Uruguay	Clay	(Brazil) Vanessa Menga	(Czech Republic) Monika Maštalířová (Argentina) Paula Racedo	1–6, 6–4, 4–6
Win	1.	9 November 1997	ITF Suzano, Brazil	Clay	(Paraguay) Larissa Schaerer	(Spain) Conchita Martínez Granados (Spain) Gisela Riera	3–6, 6–3, 7–6
Win	2.	14 September 1998	ITF La Paz, Bolivia	Clay	(Uruguay) Daniela Olivera	(Colombia) Catalina Castaño (Colombia) Carolina Mayorga	7–5, 6–7^{(5)}, 6–1
Win	3.	12 October 1998	ITF Asuncion, Paraguay	Clay	(Paraguay) Larissa Schaerer	(Hungary) Zsófia Gubacsi (Switzerland) Aliénor Tricerri	3–6, 7–6^{(3)}, 6–4
Loss	3.	23 November 1998	ITF São Paulo, Brazil	Clay	(Argentina) Paula Racedo	(Slovakia) Silvia Uríčková (France) Kildine Chevalier	3–6, 6–7^{(7)}
Loss	4.	4 April 1999	ITF Santiago, Chile	Clay	(Argentina) Paula Racedo	(Argentina) Jorgelina Torti (Argentina) Melisa Arévalo	4–6, 6–4, 4–6
