= Elena Juricich =

Uruguayan tennis player

- Full name: Elena Juricich-Sandler
- Country (sports): Uruguay
- Born: 6 September 1979 (age 45)
- Prize money: $14,667

Singles
- Career titles: 0
- Highest ranking: No. 429 (26 October 1998)

Doubles
- Career titles: 2 ITF
- Highest ranking: No. 341 (22 June 1998)

Elena Juricich-Sandler (born 6 September 1979) is a Uruguayan former professional tennis player.

Juricich represented the Uruguay Fed Cup team in a total of 14 ties, between 1994 and 1998. Playing on the professional tour, she reached a best singles ranking of 429 in the world and won two ITF doubles titles.

== ITF finals ==
=== Doubles: 6 (2–4) ===
Outcome	No.	Date	Tournament	Surface	Partner	Opponents	Score
Runner-up	1.	16 June 1997	Klosters-Serneus, Switzerland	Clay	(Venezuela) Milagros Sequera	(Netherlands) Kim Kilsdonk (Netherlands) Jolanda Mens	7–6^{(8)}, 4–6, 2–6
Winner	1.	18 August 1997	Margarita, Venezuela	Clay	(Venezuela) Milagros Sequera	(Argentina) Mariana López Palacios (Argentina) Jorgelina Torti	7–6^{(4)}, 7–5
Winner	2.	9 March 1998	Nuevo Laredo, Mexico	Hard	(Peru) María Eugenia Rojas	(Japan) Hiromi Bethard (Canada) Ioana Plesu	6–3, 6–4
Runner-up	2.	17 August 1998	Ibarra, Ecuador	Clay	(Peru) María Eugenia Rojas	(Chile) Paula Cabezas (United Kingdom) Joanne Moore	3–6, 4–6
Runner-up	3.	31 August 1998	Guayaquil, Ecuador	Clay	(Peru) María Eugenia Rojas	(Argentina) Florencia Basile (Argentina) Melisa Arévalo	2–6, 2–6
Runner-up	4.	8 November 1999	San Salvador, El Salvador	Clay	(Venezuela) Stephanie Schaer	(United Kingdom) Joanne Moore (Switzerland) Aliénor Tricerri	5–7, 1–2 ret.
