= Daniela Álvarez (tennis) =

Bolivian tennis player

- Country (sports): Bolivia
- Born: 28 December 1983 (age 41) Santa Cruz, Bolivia

Singles
- Career record: 13–18
- Highest ranking: No. 749 (26 August 2002)

Doubles
- Career record: 36–15
- Career titles: 4 ITF
- Highest ranking: No. 461 (17 September 2001)

Team competitions
- Fed Cup: 21–13

Daniela Álvarez (born 28 December 1983) is a Bolivian former professional tennis player.

== Biography ==
Born in Santa Cruz, Álvarez debuted for the Bolivia Fed Cup team at the age of 14 and was a junior doubles quarter-finalist at the 2001 French Open. She competed on the ITF circuit until 2002, winning four doubles titles. In 2003 she represented Bolivia at the Santo Domingo Pan American Games.

Álvarez retired from the tour in 2003 and played college tennis at South Carolina's Clemson University for four years, graduating with a sports management degree in 2006. She never returned to the circuit but did play another year of Fed Cup tennis for Bolivia in 2007 and ended her Fed Cup career having appeared in a total of 27 ties.

Her younger sister, María Fernanda Álvarez, was also a tennis player.

== ITF finals ==
=== Doubles: 7 (4–3) ===
Outcome	No.	Date	Tournament	Surface	Partner	Opponents	Score
Winner	1.	13 November 2000	San Salvador, El Salvador	Clay	(Mexico) Zerene Reyes	(Mexico) María Eugenia Brito (Mexico) Erika Clarke	5–4^{(3)}, 4–1, 5–3
Winner	2.	29 July 2001	Guayaquil, Ecuador	Clay	(Uruguay) Ana Lucía Migliarini de León	(Paraguay) María Alejandra García (Paraguay) Larissa Schaerer	6–2, 6–2
Runner-up	1.	6 August 2001	Lima, Peru	Clay	(Uruguay) Ana Lucía Migliarini de León	(Brazil) Maria Fernanda Alves (Brazil) Carla Tiene	6–0, 3–6, 2–6
Runner-up	2.	13 August 2001	La Paz, Bolivia	Clay	(Uruguay) Ana Lucía Migliarini de León	(Argentina) Melisa Arévalo (Brazil) Carla Tiene	2–4 ret.
Winner	3.	4 August 2002	Manta, Ecuador	Clay	(Uruguay) Ana Lucía Migliarini de León	(Mexico) María Eugenia Brito (Mexico) Regina Temez	6–2, 4–6, 6–3
Winner	4.	12 August 2002	La Paz, Bolivia	Clay	(Uruguay) Ana Lucía Migliarini de León	(Brazil) Lívia Azzi (Brazil) Bruna Colósio	1–6, 6–3, 6–0
Runner-up	3.	19 August 2002	Asunción, Paraguay	Clay	(Uruguay) Ana Lucía Migliarini de León	(Brazil) Maria Cláudia Alves (Brazil) Bruna Colósio	4–6, 6–1, 2–6
