= Haiti Billie Jean King Cup team =

Team representing Haiti in Fed Cup tennis competitions

Haiti
- Years played: 2
- Ties played (W–L): 10 (4–6)
- Best finish: Zonal Group II RR (1998, 1999)
- Most total wins: Neyssa Etienne (8–5)
- Most singles wins: Neyssa Etienne (5–2)
- Most doubles wins: Emmanuelle Duval (3–1); Neyssa Etienne (3–3)
- Best doubles team: Emmanuelle Duval / Neyssa Etienne (3–0)
- Most ties played: Jennifer Adrien (9)
- Most years played: Jennifer Adrien (2)

The Haiti Fed Cup team represents Haiti in Fed Cup tennis competition and are governed by the Fédération Haïtienne de Tennis. They have not competed since 1999.

== History ==
Haiti competed in its first Fed Cup in 1998. Their best result was finishing seventh in Group II in their debut year.

== See also ==
- Billie Jean King Cup
- Haiti Davis Cup team
