= Alexandra Chong =

Jamaican entrepreneur

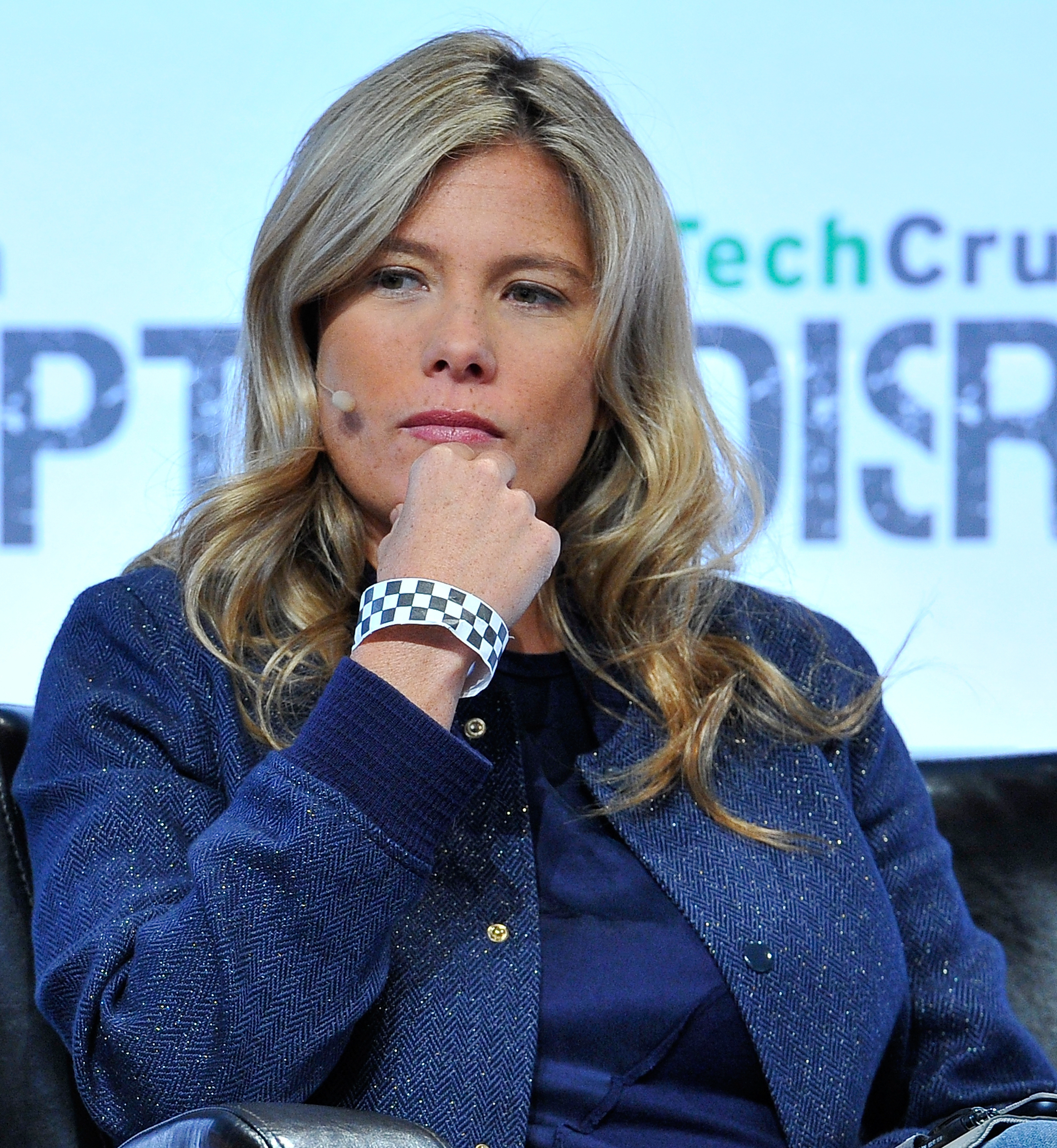
- Alexandra Chong at TechCrunch Disrupt SF 2015
- Born: Spanish Town, Jamaica
- Education: London School of Economics
- Occupations: Founder and CEO of Jacana; Founder of Lulu
- Spouse: Jack Brockway (m. 2015)

Alexandra Chong is a Jamaican entrepreneur. She is the founder and CEO of Jacana, a global wellness company. Jacana cultivates, develops and distributes wellness products internationally.

She was previously the founder and CEO of Lulu, a mobile app for dating intelligence. Business Insider and AdWeek have recognized her as one of the top entrepreneurs in New York. She launched Luluvise in 2011 and Lulu was released in the US by 2013. It was nominated as TechCrunch's 2013 "Fastest Rising Startup". Lulu was acquired in 2016 by Badoo.

Chong was born in Jamaica to a Canadian mother and Chinese-Jamaican father, who won the lottery and started a successful tourism company with the money. She grew up in Ocho Rios. In the 1990s, she played tennis in the women-only Federation Cup. She attended Florida International University on a sports scholarship, and Florida was one of the main sites for Lulu's launch in the US. She is a former member of the Jamaica Fed Cup tennis team and has a law degree from the London School of Economics.

After graduation, she worked in the legal department of a music licensing start-up. Before founding Lulu, Chong had a position in Upstream, a London-based mobile marketing firm.

Lulu was a highly controversial app, with its functionalities frequently described negatively in the popular press as "sexist and objectifying", "nonconsensual", and "shallow and mean". The release of Lulu caused notable social "recoil" and received significant negative coverage in the press for its violation of Facebook's policies on the use of user data.

In February 2016, it was reported that Lulu had been bought by Badoo, which is the biggest dating company in the world. Chong had known Badoo's CEO, Andrey Andreev, since 2011, which is before Lulu had launched. Chong became Badoo's president as part of the deal and moved back to London. The app was subsequently shut down, and she left Badoo in July 2016.

== Personal life ==
Chong married Jack Brockway, the nephew of the British businessman Richard Branson, in June 2015 in Jamaica. Brockway is the brother of Ned Rocknroll.
