= Cecilia Guillenea =

Uruguayan tennis player

- Full name: Cecilia Guillenea
- Country (sports): Uruguay
- Born: 24 January 1981 (age 45)
- Prize money: $12,222

Singles
- Career record: 44–32
- Highest ranking: No. 425 (9 Oct 2000)

Doubles
- Career record: 34–29
- Highest ranking: No. 395 (18 Sep 2000)
Medal record
South American Games
Bronze medal – third place	1998 Cuenca	Women's doubles

Cecilia Guillenea (born 24 January 1981) is an Uruguayan former professional tennis player.

Guillenea played for the Uruguay Fed Cup team between 1997 and 2000, winning four singles and six doubles rubbers, from a total of 15 ties. She also represented Uruguay at the 1998 World Youth Games and was a bronze medalist at the 1998 South American Games in Ecuador, partnering Daniela Peyrot in the women's doubles.

Competing on the ITF Women's Circuit, Guillenea reached her best singles ranking of 425 in the world in 2000 and won both of her two career titles that year, at Lima and La Paz. She won a further two ITF tournaments in doubles and had a career high doubles ranking of 395.

== ITF finals ==
=== Singles: 2 (2–0) ===
Outcome	No.	Date	Tournament	Surface	Opponent	Score
Winner	1.	13 August 2000	Lima, Peru	Hard	(United States) Paloma Collantes	6–2, 6–1
Winner	2.	20 August 2000	La Paz, Bolivia	Clay	(Argentina) Sabrina Eisenberg	2–6, 6–2, 6–3

=== Doubles: 2 (2–0) ===
Outcome	No.	Date	Tournament	Surface	Partner	Opponents	Score
Winner	1.	13 August 2000	Lima, Peru	Clay	(United States) Tiffany Dabek	(Argentina) Vanina García Sokol (Uruguay) Claudia Salgues	7–6, 6–2
Winner	2.	20 August 2000	La Paz, Bolivia	Clay	(United States) Tiffany Dabek	(Brazil) Nathália Bellizia (Brazil) Ana Paula Novaes	6–3, 6–3
