= Daniela Olivera =

Uruguayan tennis player

- Country (sports): Uruguay
- Born: 10 December 1980 (age 44)
- Turned pro: 1997
- Retired: 2009
- Prize money: $48,495

Singles
- Career record: 124–92
- Career titles: 1 ITF
- Highest ranking: 222 (16 April 2001)

Grand Slam singles results
- US Open: Q1 (2001)

Doubles
- Career record: 79–77
- Career titles: 7 ITF
- Highest ranking: 224 (3 December 2001)

Team competitions
- Fed Cup: 19–14

Daniela Olivera (born 10 December 1980) is a Uruguayan retired tennis player.

Olivera won one single titles and seven doubles titles on the ITF Circuit. On 16 April 2001, she reached her best singles ranking of world number 222. On 3 December 2001, she peaked at world number 224 in the doubles rankings.

Playing for Uruguay in Fed Cup, Olivera has accumulated a win/loss record of 19–14.

== ITF Circuit finals ==
=== Singles: 8 (1–7) ===
Legend $100,000 tournaments $80,000 tournaments $60,000 tournaments $40,000 tournaments $25,000 tournaments $10,000 tournaments	Finals by surface Hard (1–4) Clay (0–3) Grass (0–0) Carpet (0–0)

Outcome	Date	Tournament	Surface	Opponent	Score
Runner-up	17 August 1998	ITF Ibarra, Ecuador	Clay	(Mexico) Olga Arevalo	4–6, 1–6
Runner-up	16 November 1998	ITF Campos dos Goytacazes, Brazil	Clay	(Slovakia) Andrea Šebová	4–6, 3–6
Runner-up	8 May 2000	ITF Tampico, Mexico	Hard	(Australia) Nadia Johnston	3–6, 0–6
Winner	15 May 2000	ITF Poza Rica, Mexico	Hard	(Argentina) Melisa Arévalo	6–1, 6–4
Runner-up	5 March 2001	ITF Saltillo, Mexico	Hard	(Spain) Conchita Martínez Granados	6–2, 4–6, 1–6
Runner-up	26 March 2001	ITF Victoria, Mexico	Hard	(Austria) Petra Russegger	6–2, 4–6, 2–6
Runner-up	2 July 2001	ITF Périgueux, France	Clay	(France) Séverine Beltrame	4–6, 1–6
Runner-up	18 February 2002	ITF Victoria, Mexico	Hard	(Russia) Olga Kalyuzhnaya	5–7, 2–6

=== Doubles: 12 (7–5) ===
Legend $100,000 tournaments $80,000 tournaments $60,000 tournaments $40,000 tournaments $25,000 tournaments $10,000 tournaments	Finals by surface Hard (2–1) Clay (5–4) Grass (0–0) Carpet (0–0)

Result	Date	Tier	Tournament	Surface	Partner	Opponents	Score
Winner	14 September 1998	10,000	ITF La Paz, Bolivia	Clay	(Paraguay) Laura Bernal	(Colombia) Catalina Castaño (Colombia) Carolina Mayorga	7–5, 6–7^{(5)}, 6–1
Runner-up	30 August 1999	10,000	ITF San Juan, Argentina	Clay	(Uruguay) Virginia Sadi	(Brazil) Eugenia Maia (Argentina) Romina Ottoboni	2–6, 2–6
Winner	19 March 2001	40,000	ITF Matamoros, Mexico	Hard	(Argentina) Luciana Masante	(Austria) Bianca Kamper (Austria) Nadine Schlotterer	6–2, 6–2
Winner	26 March 2001	40,000	ITF Victoria, Mexico	Hard	(Argentina) Luciana Masante	(Argentina) Melisa Arévalo (Spain) Conchita Martínez Granados	6–4, 7–5
Runner-up	14 May 2001	10,000	ITF Turin, Italy	Clay	(Argentina) Luciana Masante	(Argentina) Melisa Arévalo (Brazil) Vanessa Menga	5–7, 2–6
Runner-up	8 July 2001	10,000	ITF Périgueux, France	Clay	(France) Kildine Chevalier	(Latvia) Līga Dekmeijere (Estonia) Margit Rüütel	4–6, 1–6
Winner	8 July 2001	10,000	ITF Getxo, Spain	Clay	(Argentina) Luciana Masante	(Spain) Anna Font (Russia) Raissa Gourevitch	6–2, 6–3
Winner	17 September 2001	25,000	ITF São José dos Campos, Brazil	Clay	(Brazil) Vanessa Menga	(Brazil) Joana Cortez (Spain) Conchita Martínez Granados	4–6, 7–5, 6–3
Winner	5 November 2001	10,000	ITF Villenave-d'Ornon, France	Clay (i)	(Madagascar) Natacha Randriantefy	(Belgium) Leslie Butkiewicz (Belgium) Caroline Maes	6–4, 6–2
Runner-up	11 November 2001	10,000	ITF Le Havre, France	Clay	(Madagascar) Natacha Randriantefy	(Latvia) Līga Dekmeijere (Russia) Maria Kondratieva	4–6, 3–6
Runner-up	29 January 2002	40,000	ITF Saltillo, Mexico	Hard	(Germany) Caroline-Ann Basu	(Argentina) Melisa Arévalo (Brazil) Vanessa Menga	6–4, 4–6, 5–7
Winner	27 May 2002	10,000	ITF Campobasso, Italy	Clay	(Germany) Caroline-Ann Basu	(Argentina) Melisa Arévalo (Argentina) Natalia Gussoni	6–4, 7–5
