= Glenny Cepeda =

Dominican former tennis player

- Country (sports): Dominican Republic
- Born: 13 April 1981 (age 44) San Pedro de Macorís, Dominican Republic
- Plays: Right-handed
Medal record
Central American and Caribbean Games
Bronze medal – third place	2002 San Salvador	Women's team

Glenny Sofía Cepeda Gabriel (born 13 April 1981) is a Dominican former tennis player.

A native of San Pedro de Macorís, Cepeda earned ITA All-American honours as a collegiate tennis player for Shorter University, where she also competed on the volleyball team. She was a 2011 inductee to the Shorter University Athletic Hall of Fame, for her contributions to both sports.

Cepeda was a regular member of the Dominican Republic Fed Cup team from 1996 to 2002, later playing a further year in 2014. She helped her side qualify for Group I of the Americas Zone in 2000 and appeared in a total of 34 ties during her career. Her 21 wins in doubles rubbers set a team record.

Outside of the Fed Cup, Cepeda also represented the Dominican Republic at the 1998 Central American and Caribbean Games, 2002 Central American and Caribbean Games and 2003 Pan American Games.
