= Cuba Billie Jean King Cup team =

Cuban women's tennis team

Cuba
- ITF ranking: NR
- First year: 1991
- Years played: 18
- Ties played (W–L): 80 (51–29)
- Years in World Group: 1 (0-1)
- Best finish: World Group (1994)
- Most total wins: Yamile Fors Guerra (46–33)
- Most singles wins: Yamile Fors Guerra (28–17)
- Most doubles wins: Yoannis Montesino (28–8)
- Best doubles team: Yamile Cordova / Yoannis Montesino (12–3)
- Most ties played: Yamile Fors Guerra (51)
- Most years played: Yamile Fors Guerra (12)

The Cuba Billie Jean King Cup team represents Cuba in the Billie Jean King Cup tennis competition and are governed by the Federación Cubana de Tenis de Campo. They have not competed since 2010.

== History ==
Cuba competed in its first Fed Cup in 1991. Their best result was reaching the 32-team main draw in 1994.

== See also ==
- Billie Jean King Cup
- Cuba Davis Cup team
