= Yamilé Córdova =

Cuban tennis player

- Country (sports): Cuba
- Born: 7 September 1972 (age 52)

Singles
- Career record: 14–0 (Fed Cup)
- Highest ranking: No. 802 (12 Jun 1995)

Doubles
- Career record: 15–3
- Career titles: 1 ITF (Fed Cup)
- Highest ranking: No. 550 (10 May 1999)
Medal record
Central American and Caribbean Games
Bronze medal – third place	1993 Ponce	Women's team
Bronze medal – third place	1998 Maracaibo	Women's doubles
Bronze medal – third place	1998 Maracaibo	Women's team

Yamilé Córdova (born 7 September 1972) is a Cuban former professional tennis player.

Active in the 1990s, Cordova competed in ITF events and was a regular fixture in the Cuba Fed Cup team, appearing in a total of 25 ties. She has the distinction of having won all 14 of her Fed Cup singles rubbers. In doubles she won a further 15 rubbers, of which 12 came in partnership with Yoannis Montesino, setting a team record.

== ITF finals ==
=== Doubles: 1 (1–0) ===
Result	No.	Date	Tournament	Surface	Partner	Opponents	Score
Win	1.	Mar 1999	Victoria, Mexico	Hard	(Cuba) Yoannis Montesino	(United States) Kylene Wong Simunyola (Peru) María Eugenia Rojas	1–6, 7–6^{(6)}, 6–0
