= Bolivia Billie Jean King Cup team =

Bolivian women's tennis team

Bolivia
- Captain: Rolando Nieva
- ITF ranking: 41 ▼3 (16 November 2015)
- First year: 1991
- Years played: 25
- Ties played (W–L): 104 (53–51)
- Best finish: Zonal Group I
- Most total wins: María Fernanda Álvarez Terán (31–31)
- Most singles wins: María Fernanda Álvarez Terán (19–18)
- Most doubles wins: Maria-Alejandra Claure (12–1); Monica Poveda (12–8); María Fernanda Álvarez Terán (12–13)
- Best doubles team: Monica Poveda / Maria-Alejandra Claure (6–1)
- Most ties played: María Fernanda Álvarez Terán (38)
- Most years played: María Fernanda Álvarez Terán (10)

The Bolivia Billie Jean King Cup team represents Bolivia in Billie Jean King Cup tennis competition and are governed by the Federación Boliviana de Tenis. They currently compete in the Americas Zone of Group II.

== History ==
Bolivia competed in its first Fed Cup in 1991. Their best result was reaching Group I in 2005.

== Current team (2017) ==
- Noelia Zeballos
- Hortência Birnbaumer
- María Fernanda Álvarez Terán
- Paola Cortez Vargas

== See also ==
- Billie Jean King Cup
- Bolivia Davis Cup team
