= Yoannis Montesino =

Cuban tennis player

- Country (sports): Cuba
- Born: June 26, 1971 (age 53)
- Prize money: $10,117

Singles
- Career record: 38–33
- Highest ranking: No. 399 (10 July 1995)

Doubles
- Career record: 41–35
- Career titles: 4 ITF
- Highest ranking: No. 314 (1 May 1995)

Yoannis Montesino (born 26 June 1971) is a Cuban former professional tennis player.

Montesino appeared in 38 Federation Cup ties for Cuba, from 1992 to 2000, winning 21 singles and 22 doubles rubbers. Her professional career was limited to satellite tournaments across Latin America, where she won four ITF doubles titles.

== ITF finals ==
=== Doubles: 8 (4–4) ===
Result	No.	Date	Tournament	Surface	Partner	Opponents	Score
Win	1.	4 March 1990	León, Mexico	Clay	(Cuba) Rita Pichardo	(Mexico) Hortensia Hernandez (Mexico) Alicia Meraz	6–0, 6–4
Win	2.	16 November 1992	San Salvador, El Salvador	Hard	(Cuba) Belkis Rodríguez	(Colombia) Adriana Garcia (Colombia) Cecilia Hincapié	6–2, 6–2
Win	3.	6 September 1993	Caracas, Venezuela	Clay	(Cuba) Belkis Rodríguez	(Ecuador) María Dolores Campana (Venezuela) Eleonora Vegliante	6–0, 6–1
Loss	1.	20 September 1993	Guadalajara, Mexico	Clay	(Colombia) Adriana García	(Cuba) Rita Pichardo (Cuba) Belkis Rodríguez	3–6, 1–6
Loss	2.	4 October 1993	Zacatecas City, Mexico	Hard	(Colombia) Adriana García	(Mexico) Lucila Becerra (Mexico) Xóchitl Escobedo	1–6, 4–6
Loss	3.	19 September 1994	Guadalajara, Mexico	Clay	(Cuba) Belkis Rodríguez	(Mexico) Lucila Becerra (Mexico) Xóchitl Escobedo	3–6, 3–6
Loss	4.	1 April 1996	Tampico, Mexico	Clay	(Cuba) Belkis Rodríguez	(Mexico) Claudia Muciño (Dominican Republic) Joelle Schad	2–6, 3–6
Win	4.	15 March 1999	Victoria, Mexico	Hard	(Cuba) Yamilé Córdova	(United States) Kylene Wong Simunyola (Peru) María Eugenia Rojas	1–6, 7–6^{(6)}, 6–0
