= Jamaica Billie Jean King Cup team =

National tennis team

Jamaica
- Colors: yellow & black
- First year: 1976
- Years played: 19
- Ties played (W–L): 68 (24–44)
- Years in World Group: 1 (0–1)
- Best finish: World Group 1R (1987)
- Most total wins: Alanna Broderick (17–12)
- Most singles wins: Sasha Hanna (10–8)
- Most doubles wins: Alanna Broderick (11–3)
- Best doubles team: Alanna Broderick / Megan Moulton-Levy (4–2)
- Most ties played: Joni Van Ryck De Groot (22)
- Most years played: Joni Van Ryck De Groot (9)

The Jamaica Fed Cup team represents Jamaica in Fed Cup tennis competition and are governed by Tennis Jamaica. They have not competed since 2004.

== History ==
Jamaica competed in its first Fed Cup in 1976. Their best result was reaching the 32-team main draw in 1987.

== See also ==
- Billie Jean King Cup
- Jamaica Davis Cup team
