= 2024 ITF Women's World Tennis Tour (April–June) =

The 2024 ITF Women's World Tennis Tour was the 2024 edition of the second-tier tour for women's professional tennis. It was organised by the International Tennis Federation and was a tier below the WTA Tour. The ITF Women's World Tennis Tour included tournaments in five categories with prize money ranging from $15,000 up to $100,000.

== Key ==
Category
W100 tournaments ($100,000)
W75 tournaments ($60,000)
W50 tournaments ($40,000)
W35 tournaments ($25,000)
W15 tournaments ($15,000)

== Month ==
=== April ===
Week of	Tournament	Winner	Runners-up	Semifinalists	Quarterfinalists
April 1	Split Open; Split, Croatia; Clay; W75; Singles – Doubles	(Croatia) Jana Fett; 6–0, 6–4	(Turkey) İpek Öz	(Germany) Stephanie Wagner (Hungary) Panna Udvardy	(Sweden) Rebecca Peterson (Czech Republic) Barbora Palicová (Greece) Valentini Grammatikopoulou (Slovenia) Veronika Erjavec
April 1	Split Open; Split, Croatia; Clay; W75; Singles – Doubles	(Greece) Valentini Grammatikopoulou (India) Prarthana Thombare; 6–4, 6–1	(Slovenia) Veronika Erjavec (Lithuania) Justina Mikulskytė	(Germany) Stephanie Wagner (Hungary) Panna Udvardy	(Sweden) Rebecca Peterson (Czech Republic) Barbora Palicová (Greece) Valentini Grammatikopoulou (Slovenia) Veronika Erjavec
April 1	Engie Open Florianópolis; Florianópolis, Brazil; Clay; W75; Singles – Doubles	(Cyprus) Raluca Șerban; 7–5, 6–2	(France) Séléna Janicijevic	(Australia) Kaylah McPhee (Italy) Giorgia Pedone	(Romania) Irina Fetecău (Italy) Miriana Tona (Argentina) Solana Sierra (Czech Republic) Michaela Bayerlová
April 1	Engie Open Florianópolis; Florianópolis, Brazil; Clay; W75; Singles – Doubles	Maria Kononova; Maria Kozyreva; 6–4, 6–3	(Serbia) Katarina Jokić (Brazil) Rebeca Pereira	(Australia) Kaylah McPhee (Italy) Giorgia Pedone	(Romania) Irina Fetecău (Italy) Miriana Tona (Argentina) Solana Sierra (Czech Republic) Michaela Bayerlová
April 1	Kashiwa, Japan; Hard; W50; Singles and doubles draws	(China) Wei Sijia; 6–1, 7–5	(Chinese Taipei) Lee Ya-hsuan	(Netherlands) Arianne Hartono (Japan) Ena Shibahara	(Japan) Sayaka Ishii (Hong Kong) Cody Wong (Japan) Aoi Ito (Belgium) Sofia Costoulas
April 1	Kashiwa, Japan; Hard; W50; Singles and doubles draws	(India) Ankita Raina (Chinese Taipei) Tsao Chia-yi; 6–4, 6–4	(United Kingdom) Madeleine Brooks (Hong Kong) Eudice Chong	(Netherlands) Arianne Hartono (Japan) Ena Shibahara	(Japan) Sayaka Ishii (Hong Kong) Cody Wong (Japan) Aoi Ito (Belgium) Sofia Costoulas
April 1	Bujumbura, Burundi; Clay; W35; Singles and doubles draws	(France) Alice Tubello; 6–2, 6–7^{(5–7)}, 6–3	Ksenia Laskutova	(France) Alice Robbe (Netherlands) Lian Tran	(Netherlands) Merel Hoedt (France) Maëlys Bougrat (Netherlands) Jasmijn Gimbrère (Poland) Anna Hertel
April 1	Bujumbura, Burundi; Clay; W35; Singles and doubles draws	(Poland) Weronika Falkowska (Netherlands) Stéphanie Visscher; 6–3, 4–6, [10–5]	(Latvia) Kamilla Bartone (Burundi) Sada Nahimana	(France) Alice Robbe (Netherlands) Lian Tran	(Netherlands) Merel Hoedt (France) Maëlys Bougrat (Netherlands) Jasmijn Gimbrère (Poland) Anna Hertel
April 1	Santa Margherita di Pula, Italy; Clay; W35; Singles and doubles draws	(Ukraine) Anastasiya Soboleva; 6–1, 6–1	(Italy) Diletta Cherubini	(Italy) Jessica Pieri (Italy) Tatiana Pieri	(Italy) Deborah Chiesa (Turkey) Çağla Büyükakçay (Belgium) Marie Benoît (Italy) Aurora Zantedeschi
April 1	Santa Margherita di Pula, Italy; Clay; W35; Singles and doubles draws	(Poland) Martyna Kubka (Greece) Sapfo Sakellaridi; 6–3, 3–6, [10–6]	(Italy) Anastasia Abbagnato (Netherlands) Eva Vedder	(Italy) Jessica Pieri (Italy) Tatiana Pieri	(Italy) Deborah Chiesa (Turkey) Çağla Büyükakçay (Belgium) Marie Benoît (Italy) Aurora Zantedeschi
April 1	Hammamet, Tunisia; Clay; W35; Singles and doubles draws	(France) Sara Cakarevic; 6–3, 6–1	(Canada) Carson Branstine	(France) Margaux Rouvroy (Bulgaria) Gergana Topalova	(Romania) Ilinca Amariei (Italy) Silvia Ambrosio (Bulgaria) Isabella Shinikova; Ekaterina Reyngold
April 1	Hammamet, Tunisia; Clay; W35; Singles and doubles draws	(Canada) Carson Branstine; Ekaterina Reyngold; 6–3, 6–0	(France) Émeline Dartron (France) Margaux Rouvroy	(France) Margaux Rouvroy (Bulgaria) Gergana Topalova	(Romania) Ilinca Amariei (Italy) Silvia Ambrosio (Bulgaria) Isabella Shinikova; Ekaterina Reyngold
April 1	Jackson, United States; Clay; W35; Singles and doubles draws	(United States) Katrina Scott; 7–6^{(11–9)}, 7–6^{(8–6)}	(United States) Jamie Loeb	(United States) Akasha Urhobo (Australia) Maya Joint	(United States) Adriana Reami (United States) Allura Zamarripa (Argentina) Melany Krywoj (United States) Ashton Bowers
April 1	Jackson, United States; Clay; W35; Singles and doubles draws	(Spain) Alicia Herrero Liñana (Argentina) Melany Krywoj; 6–3, 2–6, [10–7]	(United States) Victoria Flores (Japan) Hiroko Kuwata	(United States) Akasha Urhobo (Australia) Maya Joint	(United States) Adriana Reami (United States) Allura Zamarripa (Argentina) Melany Krywoj (United States) Ashton Bowers
April 1	Sharm El Sheikh, Egypt; Hard; W15; Singles and doubles draws	(Germany) Fabienne Gettwart; 7–5, 6–2	(Slovakia) Katarína Kužmová	(Poland) Weronika Ewald (Slovakia) Salma Drugdová	(Romania) Elena-Teodora Cadar (Cyprus) Daria Frayman; Evgeniya Burdina (United Kingdom) Talia Neilson-Gatenby
April 1	Sharm El Sheikh, Egypt; Hard; W15; Singles and doubles draws	Victoria Mikhaylova (Ukraine) Anastasiia Poplavska; 6–3, 2–6, [14–12]	(Poland) Weronika Ewald (Poland) Daria Kuczer	(Poland) Weronika Ewald (Slovakia) Salma Drugdová	(Romania) Elena-Teodora Cadar (Cyprus) Daria Frayman; Evgeniya Burdina (United Kingdom) Talia Neilson-Gatenby
April 1	Telde, Spain; Clay; W15; Singles and doubles draws	(Spain) Ariana Geerlings; 2–6, 7–5, 7–5	(Germany) Caroline Werner	(Hungary) Adrienn Nagy (Poland) Marcelina Podlińska	(Spain) Paula Arias Manjón (Netherlands) Annelin Bakker (Romania) Maria Toma (Belgium) Tilwith Di Girolami
April 1	Telde, Spain; Clay; W15; Singles and doubles draws	(Belgium) Tilwith Di Girolami (France) Laïa Petretic; 6–4, 6–3	(Netherlands) Loes Ebeling Koning (Latvia) Marina Markina	(Hungary) Adrienn Nagy (Poland) Marcelina Podlińska	(Spain) Paula Arias Manjón (Netherlands) Annelin Bakker (Romania) Maria Toma (Belgium) Tilwith Di Girolami
April 1	Monastir, Tunisia; Hard; W15; Singles and doubles draws	(United States) Hina Inoue; 6–2, 3–2 ret.	(Finland) Anastasia Kulikova	(South Korea) Jang Ga-eul; Mariia Tkacheva	(Belgium) Eliessa Vanlangendonck (Italy) Lara Pfeifer (France) Nina Radovanovic (Austria) Arabella Koller
April 1	Monastir, Tunisia; Hard; W15; Singles and doubles draws	(South Korea) Jang Ga-eul; Mariia Tkacheva; 7–5, 6–3	(Germany) Tessa Johanna Brockmann (Belgium) Ema Kovacevic	(South Korea) Jang Ga-eul; Mariia Tkacheva	(Belgium) Eliessa Vanlangendonck (Italy) Lara Pfeifer (France) Nina Radovanovic (Austria) Arabella Koller
April 1	Antalya, Turkey; Clay; W15; Singles and doubles draws	Alexandra Shubladze; 6–2, 6–1	(Germany) Chantal Sauvant	Daria Egorova (Germany) Lara Schmidt	(Turkey) İlay Yörük; Anastasiia Grechkina (Switzerland) Katerina Tsygourova (Romania) Bianca Bulat
April 1	Antalya, Turkey; Clay; W15; Singles and doubles draws	(Japan) Nana Kawagishi; Anastasia Zolotareva; 7–5, 1–6, [10–6]	(Germany) Nicole Rivkin (Switzerland) Katerina Tsygourova	Daria Egorova (Germany) Lara Schmidt	(Turkey) İlay Yörük; Anastasiia Grechkina (Switzerland) Katerina Tsygourova (Romania) Bianca Bulat
April 8	Zaragoza Open; Zaragoza, Spain; Clay; W100; Singles – Doubles	(Japan) Moyuka Uchijima; 6–1, 6–2	(Spain) Jéssica Bouzas Maneiro	Oksana Selekhmeteva (Spain) Irene Burillo Escorihuela	Iryna Shymanovich (Spain) Carlota Martínez Círez (Spain) Leyre Romero Gormaz (Italy) Martina Trevisan
April 8	Zaragoza Open; Zaragoza, Spain; Clay; W100; Singles – Doubles	(Czech Republic) Miriam Kolodziejová (Czech Republic) Anna Sisková; 6–2, 6–3	(Italy) Angelica Moratelli (Italy) Camilla Rosatello	Oksana Selekhmeteva (Spain) Irene Burillo Escorihuela	Iryna Shymanovich (Spain) Carlota Martínez Círez (Spain) Leyre Romero Gormaz (Italy) Martina Trevisan
April 8	Bellinzona Ladies Open; Bellinzona, Switzerland; Clay; W75; Singles – Doubles	(France) Loïs Boisson; 6–3, 2–6, 6–4	(Hungary) Anna Bondár	(United States) Kayla Day (France) Chloé Paquet	(Netherlands) Lesley Pattinama Kerkhove (Switzerland) Susan Bandecchi (Italy) Lucrezia Stefanini (Serbia) Dejana Radanović
April 8	Bellinzona Ladies Open; Bellinzona, Switzerland; Clay; W75; Singles – Doubles	(Czech Republic) Jesika Malečková (Switzerland) Conny Perrin; 6–7^{(4–7)}, 7–6^{(9–7)}, [10–7]	(United States) Carmen Corley (United States) Ivana Corley	(United States) Kayla Day (France) Chloé Paquet	(Netherlands) Lesley Pattinama Kerkhove (Switzerland) Susan Bandecchi (Italy) Lucrezia Stefanini (Serbia) Dejana Radanović
April 8	Shenzhen, China; Hard; W50; Singles and doubles draws	(China) Gao Xinyu; 6–4, 6–4	(China) Wei Sijia	(China) Shi Han; Valeria Savinykh	(China) Wang Meiling (China) Wang Qiang (China) Liu Fangzhou (China) Zheng Wushuang
April 8	Shenzhen, China; Hard; W50; Singles and doubles draws	(Chinese Taipei) Cho I-hsuan (Chinese Taipei) Cho Yi-tsen; 6–3, 6–4	(China) Feng Shuo (China) Wang Jiaqi	(China) Shi Han; Valeria Savinykh	(China) Wang Meiling (China) Wang Qiang (China) Liu Fangzhou (China) Zheng Wushuang
April 8	Bujumbura, Burundi; Clay; W35; Singles and doubles draws	(Poland) Weronika Falkowska; 6–4, 6–1	(France) Alice Tubello	(France) Maëlys Bougrat (France) Tiantsoa Sarah Rakotomanga Rajaonah	(France) Alice Robbe (Netherlands) Merel Hoedt (Burundi) Sada Nahimana (Netherlands) Jasmijn Gimbrère
April 8	Bujumbura, Burundi; Clay; W35; Singles and doubles draws	(Latvia) Kamilla Bartone (Burundi) Sada Nahimana; 4–6, 6–3, [10–7]	(Switzerland) Naïma Karamoko (Latvia) Diāna Marcinkēviča	(France) Maëlys Bougrat (France) Tiantsoa Sarah Rakotomanga Rajaonah	(France) Alice Robbe (Netherlands) Merel Hoedt (Burundi) Sada Nahimana (Netherlands) Jasmijn Gimbrère
April 8	Sharm El Sheikh, Egypt; Hard; W35; Singles and doubles draws	(Czech Republic) Tereza Valentová; 7–5, 6–2	(Czech Republic) Linda Klimovičová	(Germany) Fabienne Gettwart (Slovakia) Katarína Kužmová	(Belgium) Clara Vlasselaer (Poland) Weronika Ewald (Germany) Angelina Wirges (Romania) Elena-Teodora Cadar
April 8	Sharm El Sheikh, Egypt; Hard; W35; Singles and doubles draws	(Slovakia) Salma Drugdová (Poland) Zuzanna Pawlikowska; 6–4, 6–2	Elizaveta Shebekina; Daria Zelinskaya	(Germany) Fabienne Gettwart (Slovakia) Katarína Kužmová	(Belgium) Clara Vlasselaer (Poland) Weronika Ewald (Germany) Angelina Wirges (Romania) Elena-Teodora Cadar
April 8	Santa Margherita di Pula, Italy; Clay; W35; Singles and doubles draws	(Ukraine) Anastasiya Soboleva; 7–5, 6–3	(Czech Republic) Lucie Havlíčková	(Italy) Jennifer Ruggeri (Andorra) Victoria Jiménez Kasintseva	(Spain) Yvonne Cavallé Reimers (Italy) Lisa Pigato (Finland) Laura Hietaranta (Italy) Georgia Pedone
April 8	Santa Margherita di Pula, Italy; Clay; W35; Singles and doubles draws	(Spain) Yvonne Cavallé Reimers (Italy) Aurora Zantedeschi; 3–6, 6–4, [11–9]	(Greece) Sapfo Sakellaridi (India) Vasanti Shinde	(Italy) Jennifer Ruggeri (Andorra) Victoria Jiménez Kasintseva	(Spain) Yvonne Cavallé Reimers (Italy) Lisa Pigato (Finland) Laura Hietaranta (Italy) Georgia Pedone
April 8	Osaka, Japan; Hard; W35; Singles and doubles draws	(Japan) Sayaka Ishii; 6–1, 3–6, 6–3	(Canada) Stacey Fung	(Australia) Destanee Aiava (Thailand) Mananchaya Sawangkaew	(Japan) Haruka Kaji (United States) Hanna Chang (Chinese Taipei) Lee Ya-hsuan (Japan) Aoi Ito
April 8	Osaka, Japan; Hard; W35; Singles and doubles draws	(Japan) Natsuho Arakawa (Japan) Miho Kuramochi; 6–4, 3–6, [10–7]	(Australia) Lizette Cabrera (United States) Dalayna Hewitt	(Australia) Destanee Aiava (Thailand) Mananchaya Sawangkaew	(Japan) Haruka Kaji (United States) Hanna Chang (Chinese Taipei) Lee Ya-hsuan (Japan) Aoi Ito
April 8	Hammamet, Tunisia; Clay; W35; Singles and doubles draws	(Germany) Katharina Hobgarski; 6–2, 1–6, 6–2	(Italy) Sofia Rocchetti	(Romania) Cristina Dinu (France) Emma Léné	Ekaterina Reyngold (Australia) Kaylah McPhee (Germany) Franziska Sziedat (Romania) Ilinca Amariei
April 8	Hammamet, Tunisia; Clay; W35; Singles and doubles draws	(France) Emma Léné (France) Yasmine Mansouri; 7–6^{(8–6)}, 7–6^{(7–2)}	(Italy) Gloria Ceschi (Italy) Giorgia Pinto	(Romania) Cristina Dinu (France) Emma Léné	Ekaterina Reyngold (Australia) Kaylah McPhee (Germany) Franziska Sziedat (Romania) Ilinca Amariei
April 8	Boca Raton, United States; Clay; W35; Singles and doubles draws	(United States) Liv Hovde; 3–6, 6–4, 6–2	(United States) Akasha Urhobo	(United States) Katrina Scott (Australia) Maya Joint	(Mexico) Ana Sofía Sánchez (United States) Ashton Bowers (United States) Varvara Lepchenko (Japan) Hiroko Kuwata
April 8	Boca Raton, United States; Clay; W35; Singles and doubles draws	(United States) Robin Anderson (Australia) Elysia Bolton; 3–6, 6–4, [10–8]	(United States) Rasheeda McAdoo (United States) Maribella Zamarripa	(United States) Katrina Scott (Australia) Maya Joint	(Mexico) Ana Sofía Sánchez (United States) Ashton Bowers (United States) Varvara Lepchenko (Japan) Hiroko Kuwata
April 8	Telde, Spain; Clay; W15; Singles and doubles draws	(Spain) Ariana Geerlings; 6–1, 6–1	(Switzerland) Leonie Küng	(Japan) Rinko Matsuda (Netherlands) Sarah van Emst	(Romania) Maria Toma (United States) Amy Zhu (Belgium) Tilwith Di Girolami (Spain) Paula Arias Manjón
April 8	Telde, Spain; Clay; W15; Singles and doubles draws	(Sweden) Ida Johansson (Sweden) Jacquline Nylander Altelius; 6–3, 6–2	(Poland) Marcelina Podlińska (Germany) Caroline Werner	(Japan) Rinko Matsuda (Netherlands) Sarah van Emst	(Romania) Maria Toma (United States) Amy Zhu (Belgium) Tilwith Di Girolami (Spain) Paula Arias Manjón
April 8	Monastir, Tunisia; Hard; W15; Singles and doubles draws	(France) Jenny Lim; 6–3, 6–1	(Austria) Arabella Koller	(Germany) Anja Wildgruber (Belgium) Eliessa Vanlangendonck	(Finland) Anastasia Kulikova; Mariia Tkacheva (Italy) Camilla Zanolini (France) Marie Villet
April 8	Monastir, Tunisia; Hard; W15; Singles and doubles draws	(Vietnam) Savanna Lý-Nguyễn (Japan) Michika Ozeki; 6–1, 6–1	(United States) Paris Corley (United States) Dasha Ivanova	(Germany) Anja Wildgruber (Belgium) Eliessa Vanlangendonck	(Finland) Anastasia Kulikova; Mariia Tkacheva (Italy) Camilla Zanolini (France) Marie Villet
April 8	Antalya, Turkey; Clay; W15; Singles and doubles draws	(Kazakhstan) Sonja Zhiyenbayeva; 7–6^{(7–4)}, 6–4	(Turkey) İlay Yörük	(Slovakia) Karolína Mráziková (Czech Republic) Denisa Hindová	(Austria) Mavie Österreicher (Slovakia) Irina Balus (Germany) Nicole Rivkin; Anastasia Zolotareva
April 8	Antalya, Turkey; Clay; W15; Singles and doubles draws	(Czech Republic) Linda Ševčíková (Czech Republic) Karolína Vlčková; 6–3, 6–3	Anastasia Zolotareva; Rada Zolotareva	(Slovakia) Karolína Mráziková (Czech Republic) Denisa Hindová	(Austria) Mavie Österreicher (Slovakia) Irina Balus (Germany) Nicole Rivkin; Anastasia Zolotareva
April 15	Koper Open; Koper, Slovenia; Clay; W75; Singles – Doubles	(Slovenia) Veronika Erjavec; 6–4, 6–3	(Slovenia) Polona Hercog	(Australia) Jaimee Fourlis (France) Chloé Paquet	(Italy) Deborah Chiesa (Croatia) Antonia Ružić (Slovenia) Pia Lovrič (Lithuania) Justina Mikulskytė
April 15	Koper Open; Koper, Slovenia; Clay; W75; Singles – Doubles	(Slovenia) Veronika Erjavec (Czech Republic) Dominika Šalková; 6–1, 6–3	(Greece) Sapfo Sakellaridi (Italy) Aurora Zantedeschi	(Australia) Jaimee Fourlis (France) Chloé Paquet	(Italy) Deborah Chiesa (Croatia) Antonia Ružić (Slovenia) Pia Lovrič (Lithuania) Justina Mikulskytė
April 15	Chiasso Open; Chiasso, Switzerland; Clay; W75; Singles – Doubles	(Argentina) Julia Riera; 6–3, 7–6^{(7–2)}	(Hungary) Anna Bondár	(Turkey) Berfu Cengiz (France) Loïs Boisson	(United States) Kayla Day (Switzerland) Simona Waltert (Malta) Francesca Curmi (Spain) Irene Burillo Escorihuela
April 15	Chiasso Open; Chiasso, Switzerland; Clay; W75; Singles – Doubles	(United Kingdom) Emily Appleton (Germany) Lena Papadakis; 4–6, 6–4, [10–6]	(Greece) Despina Papamichail (Switzerland) Simona Waltert	(Turkey) Berfu Cengiz (France) Loïs Boisson	(United States) Kayla Day (Switzerland) Simona Waltert (Malta) Francesca Curmi (Spain) Irene Burillo Escorihuela
April 15	Shenzhen, China; Hard; W50; Singles and doubles draws	(Thailand) Lanlana Tararudee; 6–7^{(5–7)}, 6–3, 6–2	(China) Ren Yufei	(China) Wang Qiang (China) Li Zongyu	(Hong Kong) Cody Wong (China) Lu Jiajing (China) Liu Fangzhou (China) Yao Xinxin
April 15	Shenzhen, China; Hard; W50; Singles and doubles draws	(Netherlands) Arianne Hartono (India) Prarthana Thombare; 6–3, 6–2	(United Kingdom) Madeleine Brooks (Hong Kong) Eudice Chong	(China) Wang Qiang (China) Li Zongyu	(Hong Kong) Cody Wong (China) Lu Jiajing (China) Liu Fangzhou (China) Yao Xinxin
April 15	Calvi, France; Hard; W50+H; Singles and doubles draws	(Ukraine) Daria Snigur; 6–3, 6–2	(Switzerland) Valentina Ryser	(Uzbekistan) Nigina Abduraimova (Germany) Mona Barthel	Victoria Kan (Czech Republic) Linda Klimovičová (France) Irina Ramialison (United Kingdom) Sarah Beth Grey
April 15	Calvi, France; Hard; W50+H; Singles and doubles draws	(Poland) Urszula Radwańska (Switzerland) Valentina Ryser; 6–3, 6–2	(United Kingdom) Sarah Beth Grey (France) Amandine Hesse	(Uzbekistan) Nigina Abduraimova (Germany) Mona Barthel	Victoria Kan (Czech Republic) Linda Klimovičová (France) Irina Ramialison (United Kingdom) Sarah Beth Grey
April 15	Santa Margherita di Pula, Italy; Clay; W35; Singles and doubles draws	(Turkey) Ayla Aksu; Walkover	(Czech Republic) Lucie Havlíčková	(Italy) Beatrice Ricci (Germany) Stephanie Wagner	(Georgia (country)) Sofia Shapatava (France) Nahia Berecoechea (Finland) Laura Hietaranta (Italy) Jennifer Ruggeri
April 15	Santa Margherita di Pula, Italy; Clay; W35; Singles and doubles draws	(Greece) Eleni Christofi (Bulgaria) Lia Karatancheva; 6–0, 6–4	(Italy) Eleonora Alvisi (Italy) Federica Urgesi	(Italy) Beatrice Ricci (Germany) Stephanie Wagner	(Georgia (country)) Sofia Shapatava (France) Nahia Berecoechea (Finland) Laura Hietaranta (Italy) Jennifer Ruggeri
April 15	Hammamet, Tunisia; Clay; W35; Singles and doubles draws	(Belgium) Alison Van Uytvanck; 6–4, 6–2	(Burundi) Sada Nahimana	(Norway) Malene Helgø (Italy) Sofia Rocchetti	(Germany) Antonia Schmidt (Italy) Gloria Ceschi (France) Emma Léné (Poland) Weronika Falkowska
April 15	Hammamet, Tunisia; Clay; W35; Singles and doubles draws	(Czech Republic) Julie Štruplová; Ksenia Zaytseva; 4–6, 6–4, [10–4]	(Colombia) María Herazo González (Australia) Kaylah McPhee	(Norway) Malene Helgø (Italy) Sofia Rocchetti	(Germany) Antonia Schmidt (Italy) Gloria Ceschi (France) Emma Léné (Poland) Weronika Falkowska
April 15	Shymkent, Kazakhstan; Clay; W15; Singles and doubles draws	Ksenia Laskutova; 6–0, 6–2	Valeriya Yushchenko	Anna Ureke; Anastasia Sukhotina	(Italy) Irene Lavino (Slovakia) Irina Balus; Alisa Kummel (Kazakhstan) Gozal Ainitdinova
April 15	Shymkent, Kazakhstan; Clay; W15; Singles and doubles draws	(Kazakhstan) Asylzhan Arystanbekova (Kazakhstan) Sandugash Kenzhibayeva; 6–4, 6–4	(Italy) Irene Lavino (Japan) Haine Ogata	Anna Ureke; Anastasia Sukhotina	(Italy) Irene Lavino (Slovakia) Irina Balus; Alisa Kummel (Kazakhstan) Gozal Ainitdinova
April 15	Kuršumlijska Banja, Serbia; Clay; W15; Singles and doubles draws	(Germany) Luisa Meyer auf der Heide; 6–0, 6–2	(Serbia) Anja Stanković	(Romania) Carmen Andreea Herea (Romania) Eva Maria Ionescu	(Bulgaria) Julia Terziyska (Netherlands) Madelief Hageman (Serbia) Natalija Senić (Canada) Ana Grubor
April 15	Kuršumlijska Banja, Serbia; Clay; W15; Singles and doubles draws	(Serbia) Bojana Marinković (Bulgaria) Julia Terziyska; 6–3, 1–6, [10–5]	(Netherlands) Rikke de Koning (Netherlands) Madelief Hageman	(Romania) Carmen Andreea Herea (Romania) Eva Maria Ionescu	(Bulgaria) Julia Terziyska (Netherlands) Madelief Hageman (Serbia) Natalija Senić (Canada) Ana Grubor
April 15	Telde, Spain; Clay; W15; Singles and doubles draws	(Poland) Gina Feistel; 6–3, 2–6, 7–6^{(7–4)}	(Germany) Emily Seibold	(Netherlands) Isis Louise van den Broek (Germany) Joëlle Steur	(United Kingdom) Isabelle Cherny; Maria Andrienko (Hungary) Adrienn Nagy (Germany) Caroline Werner
April 15	Telde, Spain; Clay; W15; Singles and doubles draws	(Netherlands) Isis Louise van den Broek (Netherlands) Sarah van Emst; 6–4, 2–6, [10–2]	(Belgium) Tilwith Di Girolami (France) Laïa Petretic	(Netherlands) Isis Louise van den Broek (Germany) Joëlle Steur	(United Kingdom) Isabelle Cherny; Maria Andrienko (Hungary) Adrienn Nagy (Germany) Caroline Werner
April 15	Monastir, Tunisia; Hard; W15; Singles and doubles draws	(United States) Hina Inoue; 2–6, 7–6^{(7–2)}, 6–4	(United States) Sara Daavettila	Milana Zhabrailova (France) Nina Radovanovic	(France) Marie Villet (Italy) Lara Pfeifer (Japan) Shiho Akita (United States) Dasha Ivanova
April 15	Monastir, Tunisia; Hard; W15; Singles and doubles draws	Mariia Tkacheva; Milana Zhabrailova; 6–3, 6–1	(Belgium) Eliessa Vanlangendonck (Germany) Emily Welker	Milana Zhabrailova (France) Nina Radovanovic	(France) Marie Villet (Italy) Lara Pfeifer (Japan) Shiho Akita (United States) Dasha Ivanova
April 15	Antalya, Turkey; Clay; W15; Singles and doubles draws	(Czech Republic) Denisa Hindová; 6–2, 6–7^{(3–7)}, 7–6^{(7–5)}	(Germany) Chantal Sauvant	(Turkey) İlay Yörük (Slovakia) Radka Zelníčková	(Turkey) Başak Eraydın (Turkey) Defne Çırpanlı (Kazakhstan) Sonja Zhiyenbayeva (Czech Republic) Linda Ševčíková
April 15	Antalya, Turkey; Clay; W15; Singles and doubles draws	(Germany) Chantal Sauvant (Germany) Natalia Siedliska; 6–0, 6–0	(Italy) Giuliana Bestetti (Italy) Beatrice Stagno	(Turkey) İlay Yörük (Slovakia) Radka Zelníčková	(Turkey) Başak Eraydın (Turkey) Defne Çırpanlı (Kazakhstan) Sonja Zhiyenbayeva (Czech Republic) Linda Ševčíková
April 22	Ando Securities Open; Tokyo, Japan; Hard; W100; Singles – Doubles	(Australia) Maddison Inglis; 6–4, 3–6, 6–2	(Japan) Ena Shibahara	(Japan) Mai Hontama (China) Ma Yexin	(United States) Emina Bektas (Canada) Rebecca Marino (Japan) Moyuka Uchijima (Australia) Kimberly Birrell
April 22	Ando Securities Open; Tokyo, Japan; Hard; W100; Singles – Doubles	(Australia) Kimberly Birrell (South Korea) Jang Su-jeong; 7–5, 3–6, [10–8]	(Serbia) Aleksandra Krunić (Australia) Arina Rodionova	(Japan) Mai Hontama (China) Ma Yexin	(United States) Emina Bektas (Canada) Rebecca Marino (Japan) Moyuka Uchijima (Australia) Kimberly Birrell
April 22	Oeiras CETO Open; Oeiras, Portugal; Clay; W100; Singles – Doubles	(Croatia) Jana Fett; 6–0, 6–2	(Hungary) Panna Udvardy	(Ukraine) Yulia Starodubtseva; Polina Kudermetova	(Germany) Ella Seidel (Romania) Irina Bara (Italy) Camilla Rosatello (France) Carole Monnet
April 22	Oeiras CETO Open; Oeiras, Portugal; Clay; W100; Singles – Doubles	(Portugal) Francisca Jorge (Portugal) Matilde Jorge; 6–2, 6–0	Yana Sizikova (Chinese Taipei) Wu Fang-hsien	(Ukraine) Yulia Starodubtseva; Polina Kudermetova	(Germany) Ella Seidel (Romania) Irina Bara (Italy) Camilla Rosatello (France) Carole Monnet
April 22	Boar's Head Resort Women's Open; Charlottesville, United States; Clay; W75; Singles – Doubles	(United States) Louisa Chirico; 6–1, 7–5	(United States) Kayla Day	(New Zealand) Lulu Sun (Australia) Maya Joint	(United States) Varvara Lepchenko (United States) Elvina Kalieva (Greece) Valentini Grammatikopoulou (United States) Hanna Chang
April 22	Boar's Head Resort Women's Open; Charlottesville, United States; Clay; W75; Singles – Doubles	(United Kingdom) Emily Appleton (United States) Quinn Gleason; 7–6^{(7–5)}, 6–1	Maria Kononova; Maria Kozyreva	(New Zealand) Lulu Sun (Australia) Maya Joint	(United States) Varvara Lepchenko (United States) Elvina Kalieva (Greece) Valentini Grammatikopoulou (United States) Hanna Chang
April 22	Wuning, China; Hard; W50; Singles and doubles draws	(China) Wang Qiang; 1–6, 6–3, 4–3 ret.	(Thailand) Lanlana Tararudee	(China) You Xiaodi; Anastasia Gasanova	Alevtina Ibragimova (China) Lu Jiajing (China) Yao Xinxin (China) Zheng Wushuang
April 22	Wuning, China; Hard; W50; Singles and doubles draws	(India) Rutuja Bhosale (New Zealand) Paige Hourigan; 5–7, 7–6^{(7–5)}, [12–10]	(Chinese Taipei) Cho I-hsuan (Chinese Taipei) Cho Yi-tsen	(China) You Xiaodi; Anastasia Gasanova	Alevtina Ibragimova (China) Lu Jiajing (China) Yao Xinxin (China) Zheng Wushuang
April 22	Lopota, Georgia; Hard; W50; Singles and doubles draws	Evialina Laskevich; 6–4, 6–1	(Israel) Lina Glushko	Alexandra Shubladze; Daria Kudashova	Anastasia Zolotareva; Ekaterina Maklakova (Czech Republic) Tereza Valentová (United States) Hina Inoue
April 22	Lopota, Georgia; Hard; W50; Singles and doubles draws	(Slovakia) Viktória Hrunčáková (Czech Republic) Tereza Valentová; 6–2, 6–1	(Japan) Nagi Hanatani (Poland) Urszula Radwańska	Alexandra Shubladze; Daria Kudashova	Anastasia Zolotareva; Ekaterina Maklakova (Czech Republic) Tereza Valentová (United States) Hina Inoue
April 22	Mosquera, Colombia; Clay; W35; Singles and doubles draws	(Colombia) Yuliana Lizarazo; 6–1, 6–1	(Argentina) Jazmín Ortenzi	(Italy) Nicole Fossa Huergo (Brazil) Carolina Alves	(Serbia) Katarina Kozarov (Mexico) María Portillo Ramírez (Paraguay) Ana Paula Neffa de los Ríos (Italy) Miriana Tona
April 22	Mosquera, Colombia; Clay; W35; Singles and doubles draws	(Argentina) Jazmín Ortenzi (Mexico) María Portillo Ramírez; 6–3, 6–2	(Italy) Nicole Fossa Huergo (Italy) Miriana Tona	(Italy) Nicole Fossa Huergo (Brazil) Carolina Alves	(Serbia) Katarina Kozarov (Mexico) María Portillo Ramírez (Paraguay) Ana Paula Neffa de los Ríos (Italy) Miriana Tona
April 22	Santa Margherita di Pula, Italy; Clay; W35; Singles and doubles draws	(Spain) Andrea Lázaro García; 7–6^{(7–4)}, 6–3	(Italy) Lisa Pigato	(Ukraine) Oleksandra Oliynykova (Switzerland) Jil Teichmann	(Germany) Carolina Kuhl (Italy) Tatiana Pieri (Slovenia) Ela Nala Milić (Germany) Nastasja Schunk
April 22	Santa Margherita di Pula, Italy; Clay; W35; Singles and doubles draws	(Poland) Martyna Kubka (Netherlands) Eva Vedder; 7–5, 6–3	(Greece) Eleni Christofi (Greece) Sapfo Sakellaridi	(Ukraine) Oleksandra Oliynykova (Switzerland) Jil Teichmann	(Germany) Carolina Kuhl (Italy) Tatiana Pieri (Slovenia) Ela Nala Milić (Germany) Nastasja Schunk
April 22	Hammamet, Tunisia; Clay; W35; Singles and doubles draws	(Slovakia) Nina Vargová; 6–3, 2–6, 6–2	(Belgium) Marie Benoît	(Czech Republic) Julie Štruplová (France) Audrey Albié	(France) Alice Ramé (France) Sara Cakarevic (Belgium) Hanne Vandewinkel (Bulgaria) Isabella Shinikova
April 22	Hammamet, Tunisia; Clay; W35; Singles and doubles draws	(Netherlands) Jasmijn Gimbrère (Kazakhstan) Zhibek Kulambayeva; 6–4, 7–5	(Australia) Kaylah McPhee; Ksenia Zaytseva	(Czech Republic) Julie Štruplová (France) Audrey Albié	(France) Alice Ramé (France) Sara Cakarevic (Belgium) Hanne Vandewinkel (Bulgaria) Isabella Shinikova
April 22	Nottingham, United Kingdom; Hard; W35; Singles and doubles draws	(United Kingdom) Mika Stojsavljevic; 7–6^{(9–7)}, 6–3	(France) Julie Belgraver	(Austria) Tamira Paszek (Luxembourg) Marie Weckerle	(Japan) Hikaru Sato (United States) Jessica Failla (Denmark) Johanne Svendsen (Japan) Akiko Omae
April 22	Nottingham, United Kingdom; Hard; W35; Singles and doubles draws	(Austria) Tamira Paszek (Switzerland) Valentina Ryser; 6–2, 5–7, [10–5]	(Japan) Akiko Omae (Japan) Hikaru Sato	(Austria) Tamira Paszek (Luxembourg) Marie Weckerle	(Japan) Hikaru Sato (United States) Jessica Failla (Denmark) Johanne Svendsen (Japan) Akiko Omae
April 22	Shymkent, Kazakhstan; Clay; W15; Singles and doubles draws	Valeriya Yushchenko; 6–3, 2–6, 6–0	Ksenia Laskutova	Anna Ureke (Italy) Irene Lavino	(Kazakhstan) Gozal Ainitdinova (Japan) Haine Ogata; Alisa Kummel (South Korea) Shin Ji-ho
April 22	Shymkent, Kazakhstan; Clay; W15; Singles and doubles draws	Anna Ureke; Valeriya Yushchenko; 6–1, 6–0	(Kazakhstan) Dana Baidaulet; Varvara Bernovich	Anna Ureke (Italy) Irene Lavino	(Kazakhstan) Gozal Ainitdinova (Japan) Haine Ogata; Alisa Kummel (South Korea) Shin Ji-ho
April 22	Kuršumlijska Banja, Serbia; Clay; W15; Singles and doubles draws	(Greece) Dimitra Pavlou; 4–6, 6–3, 6–1	(Serbia) Anja Stanković	(Serbia) Natalija Senić (Turkey) Pemra Özgen	(Bulgaria) Lidia Encheva (Slovakia) Ingrid Vojčináková (Italy) Isabella Maria Șerban (Spain) Ana Giraldi Requena
April 22	Kuršumlijska Banja, Serbia; Clay; W15; Singles and doubles draws	(Romania) Karola Patricia Bejenaru (Montenegro) Tea Nikčević; 7–6^{(7–5)}, 6–4	(Poland) Zuzanna Kolonus (Ukraine) Daria Yesypchuk	(Serbia) Natalija Senić (Turkey) Pemra Özgen	(Bulgaria) Lidia Encheva (Slovakia) Ingrid Vojčináková (Italy) Isabella Maria Șerban (Spain) Ana Giraldi Requena
April 22	Telde, Spain; Clay; W15; Singles and doubles draws	(Slovakia) Renáta Jamrichová; 6–3, 6–7^{(4–7)}, 6–2	(Spain) María García Cid	Maria Andrienko (Switzerland) Marie Mettraux	(Sweden) June Björk (United States) Amy Zhu (South Korea) Son Ha-yoon (Netherlands) Stéphanie Visscher
April 22	Telde, Spain; Clay; W15; Singles and doubles draws	(Czech Republic) Michaela Bayerlová (Netherlands) Stéphanie Visscher; 6–4, 6–2	(Belgium) Tilwith Di Girolami (Netherlands) Sarah van Emst	Maria Andrienko (Switzerland) Marie Mettraux	(Sweden) June Björk (United States) Amy Zhu (South Korea) Son Ha-yoon (Netherlands) Stéphanie Visscher
April 22	Monastir, Tunisia; Hard; W15; Singles and doubles draws	(Lithuania) Patricija Paukštytė; 7–6^{(7–4)}, 6–2	Mariia Tkacheva	(Belgium) Eliessa Vanlangendonck (Germany) Anja Wildgruber	(South Korea) Back Da-yeon (South Korea) Lee Gyeong-seo (South Korea) Ahn Yu-jin (Japan) Hiromi Abe
April 22	Monastir, Tunisia; Hard; W15; Singles and doubles draws	(United States) Paris Corley (United States) Dasha Ivanova; 7–6^{(9–7)}, 6–2	(Lithuania) Patricija Paukštytė (Poland) Zuzanna Pawlikowska	(Belgium) Eliessa Vanlangendonck (Germany) Anja Wildgruber	(South Korea) Back Da-yeon (South Korea) Lee Gyeong-seo (South Korea) Ahn Yu-jin (Japan) Hiromi Abe
April 22	Antalya, Turkey; Clay; W15; Singles and doubles draws	(Finland) Laura Hietaranta; 6–1, 6–1	(Bulgaria) Rositsa Dencheva	(Germany) Chantal Sauvant (Turkey) Başak Eraydın	(Bulgaria) Julia Stamatova (Finland) Ella Haavisto (Slovakia) Radka Zelníčková (Japan) Nana Kawagishi
April 22	Antalya, Turkey; Clay; W15; Singles and doubles draws	(Germany) Natalia Siedliska (Slovakia) Radka Zelníčková; 6–2, 6–2	(Morocco) Aya El Aouni (Switzerland) Alina Granwehr	(Germany) Chantal Sauvant (Turkey) Başak Eraydın	(Bulgaria) Julia Stamatova (Finland) Ella Haavisto (Slovakia) Radka Zelníčková (Japan) Nana Kawagishi
April 29	Wiesbaden Tennis Open; Wiesbaden, Germany; Clay; W100; Singles – Doubles	(Argentina) Julia Riera; 3–6, 6–3, 6–2	(Germany) Jule Niemeier	(Latvia) Darja Semeņistaja (Romania) Irina-Camelia Begu	(Spain) Leyre Romero Gormaz (Slovenia) Veronika Erjavec (Czech Republic) Tereza Martincová (Ukraine) Katarina Zavatska
April 29	Wiesbaden Tennis Open; Wiesbaden, Germany; Clay; W100; Singles – Doubles	(United Kingdom) Samantha Murray Sharan (Brazil) Laura Pigossi; 7–5, 6–2	(Japan) Himeno Sakatsume (Bosnia and Herzegovina) Anita Wagner	(Latvia) Darja Semeņistaja (Romania) Irina-Camelia Begu	(Spain) Leyre Romero Gormaz (Slovenia) Veronika Erjavec (Czech Republic) Tereza Martincová (Ukraine) Katarina Zavatska
April 29	Kangaroo Cup; Gifu, Japan; Hard; W100; Singles – Doubles	(Japan) Moyuka Uchijima; 6–3, 6–3	(Australia) Arina Rodionova	(Japan) Mai Hontama (Netherlands) Arianne Hartono	(South Korea) Jang Su-jeong (Chinese Taipei) Lee Ya-hsuan (Japan) Eri Shimizu (Japan) Sara Saito
April 29	Kangaroo Cup; Gifu, Japan; Hard; W100; Singles – Doubles	(Chinese Taipei) Liang En-shuo (China) Tang Qianhui; 6–0, 6–3	(Australia) Kimberly Birrell (Canada) Rebecca Marino	(Japan) Mai Hontama (Netherlands) Arianne Hartono	(South Korea) Jang Su-jeong (Chinese Taipei) Lee Ya-hsuan (Japan) Eri Shimizu (Japan) Sara Saito
April 29	FineMark Women's Pro Tennis Championship; Bonita Springs, United States; Clay; W100; Singles – Doubles	(New Zealand) Lulu Sun; 6–1, 6–3	(Australia) Maya Joint	(Liechtenstein) Kathinka von Deichmann (United States) Ann Li	(United States) Iva Jovic (Hungary) Tímea Babos (United States) Louisa Chirico (United States) Akasha Urhobo
April 29	FineMark Women's Pro Tennis Championship; Bonita Springs, United States; Clay; W100; Singles – Doubles	(Hungary) Fanny Stollár (New Zealand) Lulu Sun; 6–4, 7–5	(Greece) Valentini Grammatikopoulou (Ukraine) Valeriya Strakhova	(Liechtenstein) Kathinka von Deichmann (United States) Ann Li	(United States) Iva Jovic (Hungary) Tímea Babos (United States) Louisa Chirico (United States) Akasha Urhobo
April 29	Lopota, Georgia; Hard; W50; Singles and doubles draws	(Ukraine) Daria Snigur; 6–1, 6–1	Kira Pavlova	Anastasia Zolotareva (Georgia (country)) Ekaterine Gorgodze	(United States) Catherine Harrison (Poland) Urszula Radwańska (Israel) Lina Glushko; Maria Kalyakina
April 29	Lopota, Georgia; Hard; W50; Singles and doubles draws	(Australia) Elysia Bolton (United States) Catherine Harrison; 6–4, 6–2	Anastasia Zolotareva; Rada Zolotareva	Anastasia Zolotareva (Georgia (country)) Ekaterine Gorgodze	(United States) Catherine Harrison (Poland) Urszula Radwańska (Israel) Lina Glushko; Maria Kalyakina
April 29	Anapoima, Colombia; Clay; W35; Singles and doubles draws	Daria Lodikova; 6–4, 4–6, 6–4	(Brazil) Carolina Alves	(France) Alice Tubello (Italy) Miriana Tona	(Paraguay) Ana Paula Neffa de los Ríos (Argentina) Julieta Lara Estable (Colombia) Yuliana Monroy (Canada) Cadence Brace
April 29	Anapoima, Colombia; Clay; W35; Singles and doubles draws	(Argentina) Jazmín Ortenzi (Mexico) María Portillo Ramírez; 6–4, 6–3	(Italy) Nicole Fossa Huergo (Italy) Miriana Tona	(France) Alice Tubello (Italy) Miriana Tona	(Paraguay) Ana Paula Neffa de los Ríos (Argentina) Julieta Lara Estable (Colombia) Yuliana Monroy (Canada) Cadence Brace
April 29	Santa Margherita di Pula, Italy; Clay; W35; Singles and doubles draws	(Switzerland) Jil Teichmann; 6–3, 6–4	(Spain) Andrea Lázaro García	(Italy) Nuria Brancaccio (Netherlands) Eva Vedder	(Germany) Carolina Kuhl (Switzerland) Katerina Tsygourova (Hungary) Natália Szabanin (Finland) Laura Hietaranta
April 29	Santa Margherita di Pula, Italy; Clay; W35; Singles and doubles draws	(Venezuela) Andrea Gámiz (Netherlands) Eva Vedder; 2–6, 6–2, [10–4]	(Finland) Laura Hietaranta (Greece) Sapfo Sakellaridi	(Italy) Nuria Brancaccio (Netherlands) Eva Vedder	(Germany) Carolina Kuhl (Switzerland) Katerina Tsygourova (Hungary) Natália Szabanin (Finland) Laura Hietaranta
April 29	Yecla, Spain; Hard; W35; Singles and doubles draws	(France) Amandine Hesse; 6–4, 3–6, 6–4	(Austria) Tamara Kostic	(Switzerland) Valentina Ryser (Italy) Lara Pfeifer	(Spain) Noelia Bouzó Zanotti (United States) Jessica Failla (Spain) Lucía Cortez Llorca (Switzerland) Sebastianna Scilipoti
April 29	Yecla, Spain; Hard; W35; Singles and doubles draws	(Hungary) Adrienn Nagy (Germany) Joëlle Steur; 6–3, 6–4	(United States) Jessica Failla (Peru) Anastasia Iamachkine	(Switzerland) Valentina Ryser (Italy) Lara Pfeifer	(Spain) Noelia Bouzó Zanotti (United States) Jessica Failla (Spain) Lucía Cortez Llorca (Switzerland) Sebastianna Scilipoti
April 29	Hammamet, Tunisia; Clay; W35; Singles and doubles draws	(Belgium) Hanne Vandewinkel; 6–1, 6–1	(Japan) Ikumi Yamazaki	(Kazakhstan) Zhibek Kulambayeva (Belgium) Marie Benoît	(Bulgaria) Isabella Shinikova; Diana Demidova (France) Audrey Albié (Colombia) María Herazo González
April 29	Hammamet, Tunisia; Clay; W35; Singles and doubles draws	(Spain) Kaitlin Quevedo (Japan) Ikumi Yamazaki; 6–3, 7–6^{(7–5)}	(Colombia) María Herazo González (France) Yasmine Mansouri	(Kazakhstan) Zhibek Kulambayeva (Belgium) Marie Benoît	(Bulgaria) Isabella Shinikova; Diana Demidova (France) Audrey Albié (Colombia) María Herazo González
April 29	Nottingham, United Kingdom; Hard; W35; Singles and doubles draws	(United Kingdom) Sonay Kartal; 6–1, 6–4	(Lithuania) Klaudija Bubelytė	(Japan) Hikaru Sato (Austria) Tamira Paszek	(United Kingdom) Naiktha Bains (France) Lucie Nguyen Tan (Kosovo) Arlinda Rushiti (France) Amandine Monnot
April 29	Nottingham, United Kingdom; Hard; W35; Singles and doubles draws	(United Kingdom) Holly Hutchinson (United Kingdom) Ella McDonald; 7–6^{(7–4)}, 7–6^{(7–5)}	(United Kingdom) Ali Collins (United Kingdom) Lauryn John-Baptiste	(Japan) Hikaru Sato (Austria) Tamira Paszek	(United Kingdom) Naiktha Bains (France) Lucie Nguyen Tan (Kosovo) Arlinda Rushiti (France) Amandine Monnot
April 29	Boca Raton, United States; Clay; W35; Singles and doubles draws	(Sweden) Kajsa Rinaldo Persson; 7–5, 7–6^{(10–8)}	(Japan) Mayu Crossley	(United States) Allie Kiick (Australia) Alexandra Bozovic	(Kenya) Angella Okutoyi (United States) Christasha McNeil (United States) Rasheeda McAdoo (Canada) Kayla Cross
April 29	Boca Raton, United States; Clay; W35; Singles and doubles draws	Maria Kononova (United States) Rasheeda McAdoo; 2–6, 6–4, [10–5]	(Spain) Alicia Herrero Liñana (Argentina) Melany Krywoj	(United States) Allie Kiick (Australia) Alexandra Bozovic	(Kenya) Angella Okutoyi (United States) Christasha McNeil (United States) Rasheeda McAdoo (Canada) Kayla Cross
April 29	Osijek, Croatia; Clay; W15; Singles and doubles draws	(Hungary) Amarissa Kiara Tóth; 6–2, 6–1	(Czech Republic) Denisa Hindová	(Germany) Luisa Meyer auf der Heide (Serbia) Luna Vujović	(Czech Republic) Denise Hrdinková (Czech Republic) Ivana Šebestová (Serbia) Dunja Marić (Czech Republic) Karolína Vlčková
April 29	Osijek, Croatia; Clay; W15; Singles and doubles draws	(Slovakia) Salma Drugdová (Czech Republic) Ivana Šebestová; 6–0, 6–2	(Croatia) Ria Derniković (Croatia) Luna Ivković	(Germany) Luisa Meyer auf der Heide (Serbia) Luna Vujović	(Czech Republic) Denise Hrdinková (Czech Republic) Ivana Šebestová (Serbia) Dunja Marić (Czech Republic) Karolína Vlčková
April 29	Kuršumlijska Banja, Serbia; Clay; W15; Singles and doubles draws	(Romania) Carmen Andreea Herea; 7–6^{(8–6)}, 4–6, 6–4	(Japan) Wakana Sonobe	(Netherlands) Madelief Hageman (Bosnia and Herzegovina) Suana Tucaković	(Greece) Dimitra Pavlou (Slovenia) Živa Falkner (Serbia) Anja Stanković (Serbia) Mila Mašić
April 29	Kuršumlijska Banja, Serbia; Clay; W15; Singles and doubles draws	(Serbia) Anastasija Cvetković (Serbia) Anja Stanković; 6–3, 7–5	(Romania) Carmen Andreea Herea (Ukraine) Daria Yesypchuk	(Netherlands) Madelief Hageman (Bosnia and Herzegovina) Suana Tucaković	(Greece) Dimitra Pavlou (Slovenia) Živa Falkner (Serbia) Anja Stanković (Serbia) Mila Mašić
April 29	Varberg, Sweden; Clay; W15; Singles and doubles draws	(Sweden) Caijsa Hennemann; 6–0, 6–1	(Estonia) Elena Malõgina	(Switzerland) Naïma Karamoko (Germany) Sina Herrmann	(Sweden) Linea Bajraliu (Sweden) Jacquline Nylander Altelius (Netherlands) Merel Hoedt (Poland) Marcelina Podlińska
April 29	Varberg, Sweden; Clay; W15; Singles and doubles draws	(Germany) Sina Herrmann (Poland) Marcelina Podlińska; 6–4, 6–1	(Sweden) Ida Johansson (Sweden) Jacquline Nylander Altelius	(Switzerland) Naïma Karamoko (Germany) Sina Herrmann	(Sweden) Linea Bajraliu (Sweden) Jacquline Nylander Altelius (Netherlands) Merel Hoedt (Poland) Marcelina Podlińska
April 29	Monastir, Tunisia; Hard; W15; Singles and doubles draws	Mariia Tkacheva; 6–4, 6–3	(South Korea) Back Da-yeon	(Indonesia) Priska Madelyn Nugroho (India) Vaishnavi Adkar	(France) Marie Villet (South Korea) Lee Gyeong-seo (China) Zou Ruirui (Japan) Hiromi Abe
April 29	Monastir, Tunisia; Hard; W15; Singles and doubles draws	(Japan) Hiromi Abe (Japan) Natsuho Arakawa; 3–6, 7–6^{(7–3)}, [10–3]	(China) Aitiyaguli Aixirefu (China) Xiao Zhenghua	(Indonesia) Priska Madelyn Nugroho (India) Vaishnavi Adkar	(France) Marie Villet (South Korea) Lee Gyeong-seo (China) Zou Ruirui (Japan) Hiromi Abe
April 29	Antalya, Turkey; Clay; W15; Singles and doubles draws	(Morocco) Aya El Aouni; 2–6, 7–6^{(7–5)}, 6–3	Valeriya Yushchenko	(Switzerland) Alina Granwehr (Czech Republic) Alena Kovačková	(Turkey) İlay Yörük; Daria Egorova (Japan) Rinon Okuwaki (Turkey) Başak Eraydın
April 29	Antalya, Turkey; Clay; W15; Singles and doubles draws	(Germany) Laura Böhner (Turkey) Doğa Türkmen; 7–5, 6–7^{(4–7)}, [10–7]	(Japan) Anri Nagata (Japan) Rinon Okuwaki	(Switzerland) Alina Granwehr (Czech Republic) Alena Kovačková	(Turkey) İlay Yörük; Daria Egorova (Japan) Rinon Okuwaki (Turkey) Başak Eraydın

=== May ===
Week of	Tournament	Winner	Runners-up	Semifinalists	Quarterfinalists
May 6	Jin'an Open; Lu'an, China; Hard; W75; Singles – Doubles	(China) Wang Meiling; 7–5, 6–2	(China) Yao Xinxin	(Thailand) Peangtarn Plipuech (China) Lu Jiajing	(China) Wang Qiang (Slovakia) Viktória Morvayová (China) Wang Jiaqi (Thailand) Lanlana Tararudee
May 6	Jin'an Open; Lu'an, China; Hard; W75; Singles – Doubles	(China) Tang Qianhui (China) Zheng Wushuang; 6–1, 6–2	(Thailand) Luksika Kumkhum (Thailand) Peangtarn Plipuech	(Thailand) Peangtarn Plipuech (China) Lu Jiajing	(China) Wang Qiang (Slovakia) Viktória Morvayová (China) Wang Jiaqi (Thailand) Lanlana Tararudee
May 6	Advantage Cars Prague Open; Prague, Czech Republic; Clay; W75; Singles – Doubles	(Czech Republic) Dominika Šalková; 6–3, 6–0	(Poland) Maja Chwalińska	(Czech Republic) Jesika Malečková (Turkey) İpek Öz	(Spain) Leyre Romero Gormaz (Ukraine) Kateryna Baindl (Canada) Marina Stakusic (Germany) Stephanie Wagner
May 6	Advantage Cars Prague Open; Prague, Czech Republic; Clay; W75; Singles – Doubles	(Australia) Jaimee Fourlis (Czech Republic) Dominika Šalková; 5–7, 7–5, [10–4]	(Germany) Noma Noha Akugue (Germany) Ella Seidel	(Czech Republic) Jesika Malečková (Turkey) İpek Öz	(Spain) Leyre Romero Gormaz (Ukraine) Kateryna Baindl (Canada) Marina Stakusic (Germany) Stephanie Wagner
May 6	Open Saint-Gaudens Occitanie; Saint-Gaudens, France; Clay; W75+H; Singles – Doubles	(United States) Claire Liu; 6–1, 6–7^{(3–7)}, 6–0	(France) Séléna Janicijevic	(France) Jessika Ponchet (France) Elsa Jacquemot	(France) Émeline Dartron (France) Jenny Lim (Australia) Olivia Gadecki; Ekaterina Makarova
May 6	Open Saint-Gaudens Occitanie; Saint-Gaudens, France; Clay; W75+H; Singles – Doubles	(France) Émeline Dartron (France) Tiantsoa Sarah Rakotomanga Rajaonah; 6–3, 1–6, [12–10]	(France) Estelle Cascino (France) Carole Monnet	(France) Jessika Ponchet (France) Elsa Jacquemot	(France) Émeline Dartron (France) Jenny Lim (Australia) Olivia Gadecki; Ekaterina Makarova
May 6	Fukuoka International Women's Cup; Fukuoka, Japan; Carpet; W75; Singles – Doubles	(Australia) Kimberly Birrell; 6–2, 6–4	(United States) Emina Bektas	(Japan) Ayano Shimizu (South Korea) Jang Su-jeong	(Australia) Arina Rodionova (Japan) Aoi Ito (China) Ma Yexin (Canada) Carol Zhao
May 6	Fukuoka International Women's Cup; Fukuoka, Japan; Carpet; W75; Singles – Doubles	(India) Rutuja Bhosale (New Zealand) Paige Hourigan; 3–6, 6–3, [10–6]	(Japan) Haruna Arakawa (Japan) Aoi Ito	(Japan) Ayano Shimizu (South Korea) Jang Su-jeong	(Australia) Arina Rodionova (Japan) Aoi Ito (China) Ma Yexin (Canada) Carol Zhao
May 6	Empire Slovak Open; Trnava, Slovakia; Clay; W75; Singles – Doubles	(Japan) Moyuka Uchijima; 7–6^{(7–3)}, 6–3	(Germany) Mona Barthel	(Slovenia) Veronika Erjavec (Czech Republic) Julie Štruplová	(North Macedonia) Lina Gjorcheska (Slovakia) Renáta Jamrichová (Slovenia) Tamara Zidanšek (Ukraine) Anastasiya Soboleva
May 6	Empire Slovak Open; Trnava, Slovakia; Clay; W75; Singles – Doubles	(Slovenia) Veronika Erjavec (Slovenia) Tamara Zidanšek; 6–4, 6–4	(Slovenia) Dalila Jakupović (United States) Sabrina Santamaria	(Slovenia) Veronika Erjavec (Czech Republic) Julie Štruplová	(North Macedonia) Lina Gjorcheska (Slovakia) Renáta Jamrichová (Slovenia) Tamara Zidanšek (Ukraine) Anastasiya Soboleva
May 6	Florida's Sports Coast Open; Zephyrhills, United States; Clay; W75; Singles – Doubles	(United States) Akasha Urhobo; 6–3, 6–1	(United States) Iva Jovic	(United States) Kayla Day (United States) Hanna Chang	(Canada) Eugenie Bouchard (Hungary) Tímea Babos (United States) Ann Li (United States) Maria Mateas
May 6	Florida's Sports Coast Open; Zephyrhills, United States; Clay; W75; Singles – Doubles	(Lithuania) Justina Mikulskytė (United States) Christina Rosca; 6–4, 6–4	(United States) Anna Rogers (United States) Alana Smith	(United States) Kayla Day (United States) Hanna Chang	(Canada) Eugenie Bouchard (Hungary) Tímea Babos (United States) Ann Li (United States) Maria Mateas
May 6	Sopó, Colombia; Clay; W35; Singles and doubles draws	(France) Alice Tubello; 6–4, 6–2	(Argentina) Jazmín Ortenzi	(Mexico) María Portillo Ramírez (Italy) Miriana Tona	(Serbia) Katarina Kozarov (Italy) Nicole Fossa Huergo (Colombia) Yuliana Lizarazo (Paraguay) Ana Paula Neffa de los Ríos
May 6	Sopó, Colombia; Clay; W35; Singles and doubles draws	(Mexico) María Portillo Ramírez (Bolivia) Noelia Zeballos; 6–4, 6–4	(Colombia) Yuliana Lizarazo (Brazil) Rebeca Pereira	(Mexico) María Portillo Ramírez (Italy) Miriana Tona	(Serbia) Katarina Kozarov (Italy) Nicole Fossa Huergo (Colombia) Yuliana Lizarazo (Paraguay) Ana Paula Neffa de los Ríos
May 6	Platja d'Aro, Spain; Clay; W35; Singles and doubles draws	(France) Audrey Albié; 2–6, 6–4, 7–5	(Germany) Caroline Werner	(France) Nahia Berecoechea (Spain) Ruth Roura Llaverias	(Spain) Charo Esquiva Bañuls (Austria) Tamira Paszek (Mexico) Ana Sofía Sánchez (Germany) Mina Hodzic
May 6	Platja d'Aro, Spain; Clay; W35; Singles and doubles draws	(Greece) Eleni Christofi (Latvia) Daniela Vismane; 6–4, 6–2	(Portugal) Matilde Jorge (Latvia) Diāna Marcinkēviča	(France) Nahia Berecoechea (Spain) Ruth Roura Llaverias	(Spain) Charo Esquiva Bañuls (Austria) Tamira Paszek (Mexico) Ana Sofía Sánchez (Germany) Mina Hodzic
May 6	Båstad, Sweden; Clay; W35; Singles and doubles draws	(Turkey) Berfu Cengiz; 6–4, 6–2	(Bulgaria) Gergana Topalova	(Sweden) Nellie Taraba Wallberg (Romania) Irina Fetecău	(Germany) Antonia Schmidt (Egypt) Sandra Samir (Sweden) Caijsa Hennemann (United States) Madison Sieg
May 6	Båstad, Sweden; Clay; W35; Singles and doubles draws	(Sweden) Linea Bajraliu (Sweden) Bella Bergkvist Larsson; 4–6, 6–2, [10–2]	(Sweden) Jacqueline Cabaj Awad (Sweden) Caijsa Hennemann	(Sweden) Nellie Taraba Wallberg (Romania) Irina Fetecău	(Germany) Antonia Schmidt (Egypt) Sandra Samir (Sweden) Caijsa Hennemann (United States) Madison Sieg
May 6	Bucharest, Romania; Clay; W15; Singles and doubles draws	(Romania) Lavinia Tănăsie; 6–2, 2–6, 6–1	(Romania) Karola Patricia Bejenaru	(Romania) Ioana Zvonaru (Romania) Anamaria Federica Oana	(Romania) Maria Sara Popa (Romania) Georgia Crăciun (Romania) Oana Georgeta Simion (Italy) Jessica Bertoldo
May 6	Bucharest, Romania; Clay; W15; Singles and doubles draws	(Switzerland) Naïma Karamoko (Netherlands) Stéphanie Visscher; 6–4, 6–1	(Romania) Iulia Andreea Ionescu (Romania) Ștefana Lazăr	(Romania) Ioana Zvonaru (Romania) Anamaria Federica Oana	(Romania) Maria Sara Popa (Romania) Georgia Crăciun (Romania) Oana Georgeta Simion (Italy) Jessica Bertoldo
May 6	Kuršumlijska Banja, Serbia; Clay; W15; Singles and doubles draws	(Serbia) Anja Stanković; 6–3, 6–0	(Poland) Daria Kuczer	(Serbia) Teodora Kostović (Serbia) Mila Mašić	(Serbia) Natalija Senić (Belgium) Vicky Van de Peer (China) Ni Ma Zhuoma (Switzerland) Jenny Dürst
May 6	Kuršumlijska Banja, Serbia; Clay; W15; Singles and doubles draws	(Switzerland) Jenny Dürst (Poland) Daria Kuczer; 6–3, 6–1	(Germany) Tea Lukic (Serbia) Natalija Senić	(Serbia) Teodora Kostović (Serbia) Mila Mašić	(Serbia) Natalija Senić (Belgium) Vicky Van de Peer (China) Ni Ma Zhuoma (Switzerland) Jenny Dürst
May 6	Nova Gorica, Slovenia; Clay; W15; Singles and doubles draws	(Brazil) Gabriela Cé; 7–6^{(7–4)}, 7–5	(Ukraine) Veronika Podrez	(Italy) Enola Chiesa (Slovakia) Kali Šupová	(Italy) Giorgia Pinto (Austria) Claudia Gasparovic (Benin) Gloriana Nahum (Italy) Chiara Girelli
May 6	Nova Gorica, Slovenia; Clay; W15; Singles and doubles draws	(Japan) Hayu Kinoshita (Montenegro) Tea Nikčević; 6–4, 6–7^{(1–7)}, [10–7]	(Latvia) Margarita Ignatjeva (Czech Republic) Karolína Vlčková	(Italy) Enola Chiesa (Slovakia) Kali Šupová	(Italy) Giorgia Pinto (Austria) Claudia Gasparovic (Benin) Gloriana Nahum (Italy) Chiara Girelli
May 6	Monastir, Tunisia; Hard; W15; Singles and doubles draws	(South Korea) Back Da-yeon; 6–3, 6–0	(Slovakia) Katarína Kužmová	(China) Zhang Ying (Egypt) Merna Refaat	Diana Demidova (Indonesia) Priska Madelyn Nugroho (South Korea) Lee Eun-ji (Colombia) María Herazo González
May 6	Monastir, Tunisia; Hard; W15; Singles and doubles draws	(South Korea) Back Da-yeon (Colombia) María Herazo González; 6–4, 6–4	(Japan) Natsuho Arakawa (China) Zhang Ying	(China) Zhang Ying (Egypt) Merna Refaat	Diana Demidova (Indonesia) Priska Madelyn Nugroho (South Korea) Lee Eun-ji (Colombia) María Herazo González
May 6	Antalya, Turkey; Clay; W15; Singles and doubles draws	(Morocco) Aya El Aouni; 6–2, 2–0 ret.	Valeriya Yushchenko	(Slovakia) Anika Jašková (Kazakhstan) Sandugash Kenzhibayeva	(Turkey) İlay Yörük (Italy) Verena Meliss (Spain) Claudia Hoste Ferrer (Germany) Natalia Siedliska
May 6	Antalya, Turkey; Clay; W15; Singles and doubles draws	(Bulgaria) Dia Evtimova (Italy) Verena Meliss; 6–4, 7–6^{(7–2)}	(Morocco) Aya El Aouni (Italy) Francesca Pace	(Slovakia) Anika Jašková (Kazakhstan) Sandugash Kenzhibayeva	(Turkey) İlay Yörük (Italy) Verena Meliss (Spain) Claudia Hoste Ferrer (Germany) Natalia Siedliska
May 13	Open Villa de Madrid; Madrid, Spain; Clay; W100; Singles – Doubles	(Japan) Moyuka Uchijima; 5–7, 6–4, 7–5	(Spain) Leyre Romero Gormaz	(Spain) Rebeka Masarova (Andorra) Victoria Jiménez Kasintseva	(Spain) Jéssica Bouzas Maneiro (Hungary) Anna Bondár (Romania) Anca Todoni; Oksana Selekhmeteva
May 13	Open Villa de Madrid; Madrid, Spain; Clay; W100; Singles – Doubles	(Australia) Destanee Aiava (Greece) Eleni Christofi; 6–3, 2–6, [10–5]	(Venezuela) Andrea Gámiz (Netherlands) Eva Vedder	(Spain) Rebeka Masarova (Andorra) Victoria Jiménez Kasintseva	(Spain) Jéssica Bouzas Maneiro (Hungary) Anna Bondár (Romania) Anca Todoni; Oksana Selekhmeteva
May 13	Zagreb Ladies Open; Zagreb, Croatia; Clay; W75; Singles – Doubles	(Croatia) Tara Würth; 7–5, 6–3	(Serbia) Lola Radivojević	(Switzerland) Jil Teichmann (Bulgaria) Gergana Topalova	(Croatia) Iva Primorac (Kazakhstan) Zhibek Kulambayeva (France) Léolia Jeanjean (Argentina) Martina Capurro Taborda
May 13	Zagreb Ladies Open; Zagreb, Croatia; Clay; W75; Singles – Doubles	(Switzerland) Céline Naef (Brazil) Laura Pigossi; 4–6, 6–1, [10–8]	(United Kingdom) Emily Appleton (India) Prarthana Thombare	(Switzerland) Jil Teichmann (Bulgaria) Gergana Topalova	(Croatia) Iva Primorac (Kazakhstan) Zhibek Kulambayeva (France) Léolia Jeanjean (Argentina) Martina Capurro Taborda
May 13	Kurume Cup; Kurume, Japan; Carpet; W75; Singles – Doubles	(United States) Emina Bektas; 7–6^{(7–1)}, 3–6, 6–3	(Australia) Arina Rodionova	(Japan) Mei Yamaguchi (Thailand) Mananchaya Sawangkaew	(South Korea) Jang Su-jeong (Canada) Carol Zhao (Japan) Miho Kuramochi (India) Rutuja Bhosale
May 13	Kurume Cup; Kurume, Japan; Carpet; W75; Singles – Doubles	(United Kingdom) Madeleine Brooks (United Kingdom) Sarah Beth Grey; 6–4, 6–0	(Japan) Momoko Kobori (Japan) Ayano Shimizu	(Japan) Mei Yamaguchi (Thailand) Mananchaya Sawangkaew	(South Korea) Jang Su-jeong (Canada) Carol Zhao (Japan) Miho Kuramochi (India) Rutuja Bhosale
May 13	Kunming Open; Anning, China; Clay; W50; Singles and doubles draws	(China) Shi Han; 6–4, 6–3	(China) Li Zongyu	(South Korea) Park So-hyun (China) Lu Jiajing	(China) Ren Yufei (China) Wang Jiaqi (China) Wang Meiling (Slovakia) Viktória Morvayová
May 13	Kunming Open; Anning, China; Clay; W50; Singles and doubles draws	(United States) Haley Giavara (Chinese Taipei) Li Yu-yun; 6–3, 6–1	(China) Feng Shuo (South Korea) Park So-hyun	(South Korea) Park So-hyun (China) Lu Jiajing	(China) Ren Yufei (China) Wang Jiaqi (China) Wang Meiling (Slovakia) Viktória Morvayová
May 13	Villach, Austria; Clay; W35; Singles and doubles draws	(Italy) Tatiana Pieri; 6–4, 7–5	(Ukraine) Valeriya Strakhova	(Japan) Ena Shibahara (Austria) Tamara Kostic	(Slovenia) Dalila Jakupović (Slovenia) Nika Radišić (Argentina) Paula Ormaechea (Australia) Tina Nadine Smith
May 13	Villach, Austria; Clay; W35; Singles and doubles draws	(Czech Republic) Aneta Kučmová (Slovenia) Nika Radišić; 6–1, 6–4	(Czech Republic) Karolína Kubáňová (Czech Republic) Renata Voráčová	(Japan) Ena Shibahara (Austria) Tamara Kostic	(Slovenia) Dalila Jakupović (Slovenia) Nika Radišić (Argentina) Paula Ormaechea (Australia) Tina Nadine Smith
May 13	Torneo Conchita Martínez; Monzón, Spain; Clay; W35; Singles and doubles draws	(United Kingdom) Sonay Kartal; 6–1, 6–0	(Czech Republic) Linda Klimovičová	(Australia) Elena Micic (Japan) Mana Kawamura	(Serbia) Mia Ristić (Austria) Tamira Paszek (Finland) Anastasia Kulikova (Mexico) Victoria Rodriguez
May 13	Torneo Conchita Martínez; Monzón, Spain; Clay; W35; Singles and doubles draws	(Brazil) Ana Candiotto (France) Tiphanie Lemaître; 2–6, 6–0, [10–5]	(Austria) Tamira Paszek (Switzerland) Valentina Ryser	(Australia) Elena Micic (Japan) Mana Kawamura	(Serbia) Mia Ristić (Austria) Tamira Paszek (Finland) Anastasia Kulikova (Mexico) Victoria Rodriguez
May 13	Bethany Beach, United States; Clay; W35; Singles and doubles draws	(Sweden) Kajsa Rinaldo Persson; 4–6, 6–3, 6–2	(United States) Akasha Urhobo	(United States) Maria Mateas (Canada) Kayla Cross	(United States) Jaeda Daniel; Kira Matushkina (Argentina) Melany Krywoj (Kenya) Angella Okutoyi
May 13	Bethany Beach, United States; Clay; W35; Singles and doubles draws	(Canada) Kayla Cross (United States) Jaeda Daniel; 7–6^{(7–3)}, 7–6^{(7–2)}	(United States) Ashton Bowers (United States) Mia Yamakita	(United States) Maria Mateas (Canada) Kayla Cross	(United States) Jaeda Daniel; Kira Matushkina (Argentina) Melany Krywoj (Kenya) Angella Okutoyi
May 13	Toyama, Japan; Hard; W15; Singles and doubles draws	(Japan) Kayo Nishimura; 6–4, 7–5	(Hong Kong) Wu Ho-ching	(South Korea) Kim Yu-jin (Japan) Funa Kozaki	(Japan) Shiho Akita (Japan) Hiromi Abe (Japan) Michika Ozeki (Japan) Yui Ohwaki
May 13	Toyama, Japan; Hard; W15; Singles and doubles draws	(Japan) Hiromi Abe (Japan) Anri Nagata; 6–2, 6–3	(Japan) Rinko Matsuda (Japan) Sera Nishimoto	(South Korea) Kim Yu-jin (Japan) Funa Kozaki	(Japan) Shiho Akita (Japan) Hiromi Abe (Japan) Michika Ozeki (Japan) Yui Ohwaki
May 13	Kuršumlijska Banja, Serbia; Clay; W15; Singles and doubles draws	(Spain) Ariana Geerlings; 7–6^{(7–2)}, 6–7^{(2–7)}, 6–4	(Serbia) Anja Stanković	Ekaterina Kazionova (Serbia) Natalija Senić	(Greece) Michaela Laki (Belgium) Vicky Van de Peer; Alexandra Vasilyeva (Italy) Virginia Ferrara
May 13	Kuršumlijska Banja, Serbia; Clay; W15; Singles and doubles draws	(Serbia) Natalija Senić (Serbia) Nina Stojanović; 7–5, 7–5	(Poland) Daria Kuczer (Belgium) Vicky Van de Peer	Ekaterina Kazionova (Serbia) Natalija Senić	(Greece) Michaela Laki (Belgium) Vicky Van de Peer; Alexandra Vasilyeva (Italy) Virginia Ferrara
May 13	Kranjska Gora, Slovenia; Clay; W15; Singles and doubles draws	(Czech Republic) Laura Samson; 6–1, 6–4	(Romania) Oana Gavrilă	(Czech Republic) Denisa Hindová (Slovakia) Laura Svatíková	(Italy) Maria Viviani (Slovakia) Nina Vargová (Serbia) Luna Vujović (Japan) Mayu Crossley
May 13	Kranjska Gora, Slovenia; Clay; W15; Singles and doubles draws	(Czech Republic) Ivana Šebestová (Czech Republic) Linda Ševčíková; 6–0, 2–6, [10–3]	Anastasia Kovaleva (Germany) Emily Welker	(Czech Republic) Denisa Hindová (Slovakia) Laura Svatíková	(Italy) Maria Viviani (Slovakia) Nina Vargová (Serbia) Luna Vujović (Japan) Mayu Crossley
May 13	Monastir, Tunisia; Hard; W15; Singles and doubles draws	Ekaterina Khayrutdinova; 6–4, 6–3	(Egypt) Merna Refaat	(Slovakia) Katarína Kužmová (Egypt) Lamis Alhussein Abdel Aziz	(China) Hou Yanan (United Kingdom) Ella McDonald (Italy) Camilla Zanolini (Brazil) Luiza Fullana
May 13	Monastir, Tunisia; Hard; W15; Singles and doubles draws	(United Kingdom) Ella McDonald (United Kingdom) Talia Neilson Gatenby; 6–4, 6–2	(China) Xu Jiayu (China) Zhang Ying	(Slovakia) Katarína Kužmová (Egypt) Lamis Alhussein Abdel Aziz	(China) Hou Yanan (United Kingdom) Ella McDonald (Italy) Camilla Zanolini (Brazil) Luiza Fullana
May 13	Antalya, Turkey; Clay; W15; Singles and doubles draws	(Turkey) Duru Söke; 3–6, 6–4, 6–2	(Italy) Federica Urgesi	(Italy) Verena Meliss (Japan) Rinon Okuwaki	(Italy) Francesca Pace; Valeriya Yushchenko; Felitsata Dorofeeva-Rybas (Bulgaria) Dia Evtimova
May 13	Antalya, Turkey; Clay; W15; Singles and doubles draws	Ekaterina Agureeva; Felitsata Dorofeeva-Rybas; 7–6^{(7–5)}, 6–3	Evgeniya Burdina; Anastasiia Grechkina	(Italy) Verena Meliss (Japan) Rinon Okuwaki	(Italy) Francesca Pace; Valeriya Yushchenko; Felitsata Dorofeeva-Rybas (Bulgaria) Dia Evtimova
May 20	Città di Grado Tennis Cup; Grado, Italy; Clay; W75; Singles – Doubles	(United Kingdom) Francesca Jones; 6–1, 7–5	(Liechtenstein) Kathinka von Deichmann	(Ukraine) Anastasiya Soboleva; Elena Pridankina	(United States) Louisa Chirico (Israel) Lina Glushko (Italy) Aurora Zantedeschi (Italy) Beatrice Ricci
May 20	Città di Grado Tennis Cup; Grado, Italy; Clay; W75; Singles – Doubles	(United States) Jessie Aney (Germany) Lena Papadakis; 6–4, 7–5	(Spain) Yvonne Cavallé Reimers (Italy) Aurora Zantedeschi	(Ukraine) Anastasiya Soboleva; Elena Pridankina	(United States) Louisa Chirico (Israel) Lina Glushko (Italy) Aurora Zantedeschi (Italy) Beatrice Ricci
May 20	Otočec, Slovenia; Clay; W50; Singles and doubles draws	(Netherlands) Anouk Koevermans; 1–6, 6–4, 7–5	(Andorra) Victoria Jiménez Kasintseva	(Switzerland) Jenny Dürst (Canada) Victoria Mboko	(Australia) Maya Joint (Bulgaria) Gergana Topalova (Poland) Gina Feistel (Spain) Ángela Fita Boluda
May 20	Otočec, Slovenia; Clay; W50; Singles and doubles draws	(Georgia (country)) Ekaterine Gorgodze (Ukraine) Valeriya Strakhova; 3–6, 6–4, [10–5]	(Australia) Maya Joint (United States) Rasheeda McAdoo	(Switzerland) Jenny Dürst (Canada) Victoria Mboko	(Australia) Maya Joint (Bulgaria) Gergana Topalova (Poland) Gina Feistel (Spain) Ángela Fita Boluda
May 20	Goyang, South Korea; Hard; W50; Singles and doubles draws	(United States) Hanna Chang; 7–6^{(7–2)}, 6–4	(Japan) Aoi Ito	(Japan) Naho Sato (Japan) Haruka Kaji	(Japan) Kyōka Okamura (Chinese Taipei) Liang En-shuo (United States) Hina Inoue (Australia) Maddison Inglis
May 20	Goyang, South Korea; Hard; W50; Singles and doubles draws	(Hong Kong) Eudice Chong (Chinese Taipei) Liang En-shuo; 7–5, 6–4	(Thailand) Luksika Kumkhum (Thailand) Peangtarn Plipuech	(Japan) Naho Sato (Japan) Haruka Kaji	(Japan) Kyōka Okamura (Chinese Taipei) Liang En-shuo (United States) Hina Inoue (Australia) Maddison Inglis
May 20	Annenheim, Austria; Clay; W35; Singles and doubles draws	(Belgium) Marie Benoît; 7–5, 3–6, 7–5	(Czech Republic) Tereza Valentová	(Belgium) Sofia Costoulas (Hungary) Amarissa Kiara Tóth	(Slovenia) Nika Radišić (Slovenia) Manca Pislak (United Kingdom) Lauryn John-Baptiste (Finland) Laura Hietaranta
May 20	Annenheim, Austria; Clay; W35; Singles and doubles draws	(Finland) Laura Hietaranta (Estonia) Elena Malõgina; 3–6, 6–3, [10–6]	(Slovenia) Nika Radišić (Latvia) Daniela Vismane	(Belgium) Sofia Costoulas (Hungary) Amarissa Kiara Tóth	(Slovenia) Nika Radišić (Slovenia) Manca Pislak (United Kingdom) Lauryn John-Baptiste (Finland) Laura Hietaranta
May 20	Santo Domingo, Dominican Republic; Hard; W35; Singles and doubles draws	(United States) Victoria Hu; 5–7, 6–3, 6–1	(Bolivia) Noelia Zeballos	(Japan) Hiroko Kuwata (Australia) Elysia Bolton	(Ecuador) Mell Reasco (United States) Catherine Harrison (Belgium) Clara Vlasselaer (United States) Lea Ma
May 20	Santo Domingo, Dominican Republic; Hard; W35; Singles and doubles draws	(Australia) Alexandra Bozovic (Hong Kong) Cody Wong; 6–7^{(5–7)}, 7–5, [11–9]	(Mexico) Jessica Hinojosa Gómez (Ecuador) Mell Reasco	(Japan) Hiroko Kuwata (Australia) Elysia Bolton	(Ecuador) Mell Reasco (United States) Catherine Harrison (Belgium) Clara Vlasselaer (United States) Lea Ma
May 20	Kuršumlijska Banja, Serbia; Clay; W35; Singles and doubles draws	(Serbia) Lola Radivojević; 6–3, 6–4	(France) Sara Cakarevic	(Serbia) Natalija Senić (Poland) Daria Kuczer	(Serbia) Nina Stojanović (Czech Republic) Michaela Bayerlová (Romania) Andreea Prisăcariu (Romania) Karola Bejenaru
May 20	Kuršumlijska Banja, Serbia; Clay; W35; Singles and doubles draws	Ksenia Laskutova (Slovakia) Radka Zelníčková; 5–7, 7–6^{(7–3)}, [11–9]	(Czech Republic) Michaela Bayerlová (Bulgaria) Lia Karatancheva	(Serbia) Natalija Senić (Poland) Daria Kuczer	(Serbia) Nina Stojanović (Czech Republic) Michaela Bayerlová (Romania) Andreea Prisăcariu (Romania) Karola Bejenaru
May 20	Bol, Croatia; Clay; W15; Singles and doubles draws	(Czech Republic) Laura Samson; 6–1, 6–2	(Croatia) Sara Svetac	(Czech Republic) Aneta Laboutková (Italy) Gaia Squarcialupi	(Germany) Selina Dal (Greece) Eleni Christofi (Poland) Anna Hertel (Netherlands) Stéphanie Visscher
May 20	Bol, Croatia; Clay; W15; Singles and doubles draws	(Switzerland) Marie Mettraux (Netherlands) Stéphanie Visscher; 6–4, 6–1	(Poland) Xenia Bandurowska (Hungary) Panna Bartha	(Czech Republic) Aneta Laboutková (Italy) Gaia Squarcialupi	(Germany) Selina Dal (Greece) Eleni Christofi (Poland) Anna Hertel (Netherlands) Stéphanie Visscher
May 20	Fukui, Japan; Hard; W15; Singles and doubles draws	(Japan) Mio Mushika; 7–5, 6–4	(Japan) Shiho Akita	(Japan) Ikumi Yamazaki (Japan) Kayo Nishimura	(Japan) Yui Chikaraishi (Hong Kong) Wu Ho-ching (Japan) Yui Ohwaki (Slovakia) Viktória Morvayová
May 20	Fukui, Japan; Hard; W15; Singles and doubles draws	(Japan) Hiromi Abe (Japan) Anri Nagata; 6–4, 6–0	(Chinese Taipei) Lin Fang-an (South Korea) Kim Yu-jin	(Japan) Ikumi Yamazaki (Japan) Kayo Nishimura	(Japan) Yui Chikaraishi (Hong Kong) Wu Ho-ching (Japan) Yui Ohwaki (Slovakia) Viktória Morvayová
May 20	Bucharest, Romania; Clay; W15; Singles and doubles draws	(Germany) Emily Welker; 6–1, 6–3	(Romania) Eva Maria Ionescu	Kristiana Sidorova (Germany) Nicole Rivkin	(Romania) Patricia Maria Țig (Romania) Arina Gabriela Vasilescu (Romania) Sofia Maria Bărbulescu (Romania) Georgia Crăciun
May 20	Bucharest, Romania; Clay; W15; Singles and doubles draws	(Romania) Ștefania Bojică (Romania) Cara Maria Meșter; 0–6, 6–4, [10–8]	(Bulgaria) Yoana Konstantinova; Kristiana Sidorova	Kristiana Sidorova (Germany) Nicole Rivkin	(Romania) Patricia Maria Țig (Romania) Arina Gabriela Vasilescu (Romania) Sofia Maria Bărbulescu (Romania) Georgia Crăciun
May 20	Estepona, Spain; Hard; W15; Singles and doubles draws	(Sweden) Jacqueline Cabaj Awad; 6–2, 6–4	(United Kingdom) Alice Gillan	(Finland) Anastasia Kulikova (Switzerland) Sebastianna Scilipoti	(Australia) Elena Micic (Slovakia) Katarína Strešnáková (Spain) María Martínez Vaquero (Luxembourg) Marie Weckerle
May 20	Estepona, Spain; Hard; W15; Singles and doubles draws	(Sweden) Jacqueline Cabaj Awad (Luxembourg) Marie Weckerle; 6–4, 6–4	(Kazakhstan) Gozal Ainitdinova; Elina Nepliy	(Finland) Anastasia Kulikova (Switzerland) Sebastianna Scilipoti	(Australia) Elena Micic (Slovakia) Katarína Strešnáková (Spain) María Martínez Vaquero (Luxembourg) Marie Weckerle
May 20	Monastir, Tunisia; Hard; W15; Singles and doubles draws	(United Kingdom) Ella McDonald; 6–4, 6–2	Daria Khomutsianskaya	(India) Zeel Desai (Indonesia) Priska Nugroho	(Slovakia) Katarína Kužmová (Colombia) María Herazo González; Diana Demidova; Daria Kudashova
May 20	Monastir, Tunisia; Hard; W15; Singles and doubles draws	(Kenya) Angella Okutoyi (Egypt) Merna Refaat; 6–2, 6–2	(China) Liu Leyi (China) Xu Jiayu	(India) Zeel Desai (Indonesia) Priska Nugroho	(Slovakia) Katarína Kužmová (Colombia) María Herazo González; Diana Demidova; Daria Kudashova
May 27	Internazionali Femminili di Brescia; Brescia, Italy; Clay; W75; Singles – Doubles	(Ukraine) Katarina Zavatska; 6–2, 6–3	(United States) Varvara Lepchenko	(United States) Ann Li; Polina Kudermetova	(Italy) Nuria Brancaccio (France) Alice Ramé (Ukraine) Kateryna Baindl (Germany) Ella Seidel
May 27	Internazionali Femminili di Brescia; Brescia, Italy; Clay; W75; Singles – Doubles	(Spain) Yvonne Cavallé Reimers (Italy) Aurora Zantedeschi; 3–6, 7–5, [10–6]	(Kazakhstan) Zhibek Kulambayeva; Ekaterina Reyngold	(United States) Ann Li; Polina Kudermetova	(Italy) Nuria Brancaccio (France) Alice Ramé (Ukraine) Kateryna Baindl (Germany) Ella Seidel
May 27	Troisdorf, Germany; Clay; W50; Singles and doubles draws	(Turkey) Berfu Cengiz; 6–1, 2–6, 6–3	(Switzerland) Susan Bandecchi	(Romania) Anca Todoni (Cyprus) Raluca Șerban	(France) Audrey Albié (Germany) Mona Barthel (United States) Elvina Kalieva (Poland) Gina Feistel
May 27	Troisdorf, Germany; Clay; W50; Singles and doubles draws	(Cyprus) Raluca Șerban (Romania) Anca Todoni; 6–0, 6–3	(Germany) Yana Morderger (United States) Chiara Scholl	(Romania) Anca Todoni (Cyprus) Raluca Șerban	(France) Audrey Albié (Germany) Mona Barthel (United States) Elvina Kalieva (Poland) Gina Feistel
May 27	Montemor-o-Novo, Portugal; Hard; W50; Singles and doubles draws	(Italy) Lucrezia Stefanini; 6–4, 6–0	(Australia) Talia Gibson	(Switzerland) Valentina Ryser (India) Ankita Raina	(Australia) Kimberly Birrell (Switzerland) Leonie Küng (Australia) Destanee Aiava (Finland) Anastasia Kulikova
May 27	Montemor-o-Novo, Portugal; Hard; W50; Singles and doubles draws	(United Kingdom) Madeleine Brooks (Hong Kong) Eudice Chong; 6–4, 6–4	(Switzerland) Leonie Küng; Evialina Laskevich	(Switzerland) Valentina Ryser (India) Ankita Raina	(Australia) Kimberly Birrell (Switzerland) Leonie Küng (Australia) Destanee Aiava (Finland) Anastasia Kulikova
May 27	Otočec, Slovenia; Clay; W50; Singles and doubles draws	(Czech Republic) Barbora Palicová; 6–1, 2–6, 6–4	(Canada) Victoria Mboko	(Serbia) Lola Radivojević (Australia) Maya Joint	(Turkey) Ayla Aksu (Croatia) Iva Primorac (Romania) Miriam Bulgaru (Poland) Maja Chwalińska
May 27	Otočec, Slovenia; Clay; W50; Singles and doubles draws	(Georgia (country)) Ekaterine Gorgodze (Ukraine) Valeriya Strakhova; 4–6, 6–2, [10–4]	Anastasiia Gureva; Anastasia Kovaleva	(Serbia) Lola Radivojević (Australia) Maya Joint	(Turkey) Ayla Aksu (Croatia) Iva Primorac (Romania) Miriam Bulgaru (Poland) Maja Chwalińska
May 27	Klagenfurt, Austria; Clay; W35; Singles and doubles draws	(Belgium) Marie Benoît; 6–1, 6–3	(Belgium) Sofia Costoulas	(Turkey) Çağla Büyükakçay (Germany) Stephanie Wagner	(Japan) Wakana Sonobe (Slovakia) Eszter Méri (Finland) Laura Hietaranta (France) Julie Belgraver
May 27	Klagenfurt, Austria; Clay; W35; Singles and doubles draws	(Czech Republic) Aneta Kučmová (Slovenia) Nika Radišić; 6–3, 7–5	(Australia) Kaylah McPhee (Slovakia) Nina Vargová	(Turkey) Çağla Büyükakçay (Germany) Stephanie Wagner	(Japan) Wakana Sonobe (Slovakia) Eszter Méri (Finland) Laura Hietaranta (France) Julie Belgraver
May 27	Santo Domingo, Dominican Republic; Hard; W35; Singles and doubles draws	(United States) Victoria Hu; 6–4, 6–7^{(6–8)}, 6–4	(United States) Catherine Harrison	(Mexico) María Portillo Ramírez (Australia) Alexandra Bozovic	(Belgium) Clara Vlasselaer (United States) Katrina Scott (India) Sahaja Yamalapalli (United States) Jessica Failla
May 27	Santo Domingo, Dominican Republic; Hard; W35; Singles and doubles draws	(Mexico) Julia García (Dominican Republic) Ana Carmen Zamburek; 6–4, 2–6, [10–4]	(Ecuador) Mell Reasco (Germany) Antonia Schmidt	(Mexico) María Portillo Ramírez (Australia) Alexandra Bozovic	(Belgium) Clara Vlasselaer (United States) Katrina Scott (India) Sahaja Yamalapalli (United States) Jessica Failla
May 27	Changwon, South Korea; Hard; W35; Singles and doubles draws	(United States) Hanna Chang; 6–4, 6–4	(Australia) Petra Hule	(South Korea) Back Da-yeon (Japan) Kyoka Okamura	(Australia) Gabriella Da Silva-Fick (Japan) Haruna Arakawa (Japan) Haruka Kaji (Japan) Hikaru Sato
May 27	Changwon, South Korea; Hard; W35; Singles and doubles draws	(New Zealand) Paige Hourigan (Japan) Erika Sema; 6–4, 4–6, [10–4]	(China) Li Zongyu (China) Shi Han	(South Korea) Back Da-yeon (Japan) Kyoka Okamura	(Australia) Gabriella Da Silva-Fick (Japan) Haruna Arakawa (Japan) Haruka Kaji (Japan) Hikaru Sato
May 27	La Marsa, Tunisia; Hard; W35; Singles and doubles draws	(France) Manon Léonard; 6–1, 6–3	(Belgium) Lara Salden	(China) Mi Lan (Austria) Tamara Kostic	(Bulgaria) Isabella Shinikova; Mariia Tkacheva (Switzerland) Tess Sugnaux (France) Tiphanie Lemaître
May 27	La Marsa, Tunisia; Hard; W35; Singles and doubles draws	(Belgium) Magali Kempen (Belgium) Lara Salden; 6–4, 7–6^{(7–5)}	(Slovakia) Katarína Kužmová (Slovakia) Radka Zelníčková	(China) Mi Lan (Austria) Tamara Kostic	(Bulgaria) Isabella Shinikova; Mariia Tkacheva (Switzerland) Tess Sugnaux (France) Tiphanie Lemaître
May 27	Rio Claro, Brazil; Clay; W15; Singles and doubles draws	(Argentina) Jazmín Ortenzi; 6–1, 6–2	(United States) Amy Zhu	(Brazil) Thaísa Grana Pedretti (Argentina) Luisina Giovannini	(Argentina) Candela Vázquez (Argentina) Sol Ailin Larraya Guidi (Brazil) Júlia Konishi Camargo Silva (Argentina) Francesca Mattioli
May 27	Rio Claro, Brazil; Clay; W15; Singles and doubles draws	(Brazil) Rebeca Pereira (Ecuador) Camila Romero; 6–3, 6–1	(Argentina) Jazmín Ortenzi (Peru) Lucciana Pérez Alarcón	(Brazil) Thaísa Grana Pedretti (Argentina) Luisina Giovannini	(Argentina) Candela Vázquez (Argentina) Sol Ailin Larraya Guidi (Brazil) Júlia Konishi Camargo Silva (Argentina) Francesca Mattioli
May 27	Bol, Croatia; Clay; W15; Singles and doubles draws	(Germany) Sina Herrmann; 7–5, 6–4	(Poland) Weronika Ewald	(Germany) Selina Dal (Croatia) Dora Mišković	(Czech Republic) Denisa Hindová (Switzerland) Marie Mettraux (Italy) Anastasia Bertacchi (France) Eleejah Inisan
May 27	Bol, Croatia; Clay; W15; Singles and doubles draws	(Czech Republic) Denisa Hindová (Czech Republic) Aneta Laboutková; 6–3, 6–4	(Switzerland) Marie Mettraux (Netherlands) Stéphanie Visscher	(Germany) Selina Dal (Croatia) Dora Mišković	(Czech Republic) Denisa Hindová (Switzerland) Marie Mettraux (Italy) Anastasia Bertacchi (France) Eleejah Inisan
May 27	Tokyo, Japan; Hard; W15; Singles and doubles draws	(Japan) Akiko Omae; 6–2, 7–6^{(7–2)}	(Japan) Hiromi Abe	(China) Ye Shiyu (Japan) Nana Kawagishi	(Slovakia) Viktória Morvayová (Japan) Kanako Morisaki (Japan) Nanari Katsumi (Japan) Hayu Kinoshita
May 27	Tokyo, Japan; Hard; W15; Singles and doubles draws	(Japan) Hiromi Abe (Japan) Kanako Morisaki; 6–2, 6–2	(Japan) Yuka Hosoki (Japan) Funa Kozaki	(China) Ye Shiyu (Japan) Nana Kawagishi	(Slovakia) Viktória Morvayová (Japan) Kanako Morisaki (Japan) Nanari Katsumi (Japan) Hayu Kinoshita
May 27	Galați, Romania; Clay; W15; Singles and doubles draws	(Spain) Cristina Díaz Adrover; 2–6, 6–4, 6–1	(Romania) Georgia Crăciun	(Romania) Patricia Maria Țig (Romania) Lavinia Tănăsie	(Romania) Eva Maria Ionescu (Romania) Arina Vasilescu (Italy) Lavinia Luciano (Romania) Anamaria Oana
May 27	Galați, Romania; Clay; W15; Singles and doubles draws	(Argentina) Victoria Bosio (Romania) Patricia Maria Țig; 7–5, 7–5	(Romania) Alexandra Anghel (Romania) Cristiana Todoni	(Romania) Patricia Maria Țig (Romania) Lavinia Tănăsie	(Romania) Eva Maria Ionescu (Romania) Arina Vasilescu (Italy) Lavinia Luciano (Romania) Anamaria Oana
May 27	Kuršumlijska Banja, Serbia; Clay; W15; Singles and doubles draws	(Romania) Andreea Prisăcariu; 5–7, 6–4, 7–5	(Romania) Ioana Zvonaru	(Serbia) Dunja Marić (Romania) Patricia Georgiana Goina	(Netherlands) Madelief Hageman (Italy) Denise Valente; Ekaterina Ovcharenko (Italy) Virginia Ferrara
May 27	Kuršumlijska Banja, Serbia; Clay; W15; Singles and doubles draws	(Romania) Karola Patricia Bejenaru (Algeria) Inès Ibbou; 7–6^{(10–8)}, 6–7^{(6–8)}, [10–5]	(Serbia) Elena Milovanović (Romania) Andreea Prisăcariu	(Serbia) Dunja Marić (Romania) Patricia Georgiana Goina	(Netherlands) Madelief Hageman (Italy) Denise Valente; Ekaterina Ovcharenko (Italy) Virginia Ferrara
May 27	Monastir, Tunisia; Hard; W15; Singles and doubles draws	(Cyprus) Daria Frayman; 6–3, 6–1	(China) Zhang Ying	(Italy) Samira De Stefano (Belgium) Eliessa Vanlangendonck	(India) Zeel Desai (Spain) Noelia Bouzó Zanotti (United Kingdom) Ella McDonald (France) Alyssa Réguer
May 27	Monastir, Tunisia; Hard; W15; Singles and doubles draws	(China) Xiao Zhenghua (China) Xu Jiayu; 7–6^{(9–7)}, 7–5	(India) Zeel Desai (Switzerland) Naïma Karamoko	(Italy) Samira De Stefano (Belgium) Eliessa Vanlangendonck	(India) Zeel Desai (Spain) Noelia Bouzó Zanotti (United Kingdom) Ella McDonald (France) Alyssa Réguer
May 27	San Diego, United States; Hard; W15; Singles and doubles draws	(South Africa) Gabriella Broadfoot; 6–2, 7–6 ^{(7–2)}	(Sweden) Lisa Zaar	(United States) Haley Giavara (France) Chloé Noël	(United States) Aspen Schuman (Paraguay) Leyla Fiorella Britez Risso (Australia) Lily Fairclough (United States) Dasha Ivanova
May 27	San Diego, United States; Hard; W15; Singles and doubles draws	(United States) Haley Giavara (United States) Kelly Keller; 2–6, 6–2, [10–5]	(United States) Dasha Ivanova (Sweden) Lisa Zaar	(United States) Haley Giavara (France) Chloé Noël	(United States) Aspen Schuman (Paraguay) Leyla Fiorella Britez Risso (Australia) Lily Fairclough (United States) Dasha Ivanova

=== June ===
Week of	Tournament	Winner	Runners-up	Semifinalists	Quarterfinalists
June 3	Surbiton Trophy; Surbiton, United Kingdom; Grass; W100; Singles – Doubles	(Belgium) Alison Van Uytvanck; 6–7^{(5–7)}, 6–1, 6–2	(Germany) Tatjana Maria	(France) Harmony Tan (Australia) Olivia Gadecki	(United Kingdom) Emily Appleton (Belgium) Greet Minnen (Australia) Ajla Tomljanović (Australia) Kimberly Birrell
June 3	Surbiton Trophy; Surbiton, United Kingdom; Grass; W100; Singles – Doubles	(United States) Emina Bektas (Serbia) Aleksandra Krunić; 6–1, 6–1	(United Kingdom) Sarah Beth Grey (United Kingdom) Tara Moore	(France) Harmony Tan (Australia) Olivia Gadecki	(United Kingdom) Emily Appleton (Belgium) Greet Minnen (Australia) Ajla Tomljanović (Australia) Kimberly Birrell
June 3	Internazionali Femminili di Tennis Città di Caserta; Caserta, Italy; Clay; W75; Singles – Doubles	(Spain) Leyre Romero Gormaz; 6–2, 4–6, 6–4	(Switzerland) Jil Teichmann	(Brazil) Laura Pigossi (Japan) Sara Saito	(Italy) Anastasia Abbagnato (Italy) Tatiana Pieri (France) Amandine Hesse (Greece) Martha Matoula
June 3	Internazionali Femminili di Tennis Città di Caserta; Caserta, Italy; Clay; W75; Singles – Doubles	(Colombia) Yuliana Lizarazo (Greece) Despina Papamichail; 4–6, 6–3, [10–3]	(United Kingdom) Ali Collins (Colombia) María Paulina Pérez	(Brazil) Laura Pigossi (Japan) Sara Saito	(Italy) Anastasia Abbagnato (Italy) Tatiana Pieri (France) Amandine Hesse (Greece) Martha Matoula
June 3	Palmetto Pro Open; Sumter, United States; Hard; W75; Singles – Doubles	(Canada) Carson Branstine; 7–6^{(8–6)}, 6–7^{(6–8)}, 6–1	(United States) Sophie Chang	(United States) Maria Mateas (United States) Allie Kiick	(India) Sahaja Yamalapalli (United States) Anna Rogers (United States) Catherine Harrison (United States) Jessica Failla
June 3	Palmetto Pro Open; Sumter, United States; Hard; W75; Singles – Doubles	(Spain) Alicia Herrero Liñana (Argentina) Melany Krywoj; 6–3, 6–3	(United States) Sophie Chang (United States) Dalayna Hewitt	(United States) Maria Mateas (United States) Allie Kiick	(India) Sahaja Yamalapalli (United States) Anna Rogers (United States) Catherine Harrison (United States) Jessica Failla
June 3	Montemor-o-Novo, Portugal; Hard; W50; Singles and doubles draws	(Hong Kong) Eudice Chong; 3–6, 6–2, 6–1	(Czech Republic) Gabriela Knutson	(Sweden) Jacqueline Cabaj Awad (Portugal) Angelina Voloshchuk	(Luxembourg) Marie Weckerle (Canada) Katherine Sebov (India) Ankita Raina; Sofya Lansere
June 3	Montemor-o-Novo, Portugal; Hard; W50; Singles and doubles draws	(Australia) Elena Micic (Australia) Alana Parnaby; 7–6^{(8–6)}, 6–4	(Hong Kong) Eudice Chong (Italy) Lucrezia Musetti	(Sweden) Jacqueline Cabaj Awad (Portugal) Angelina Voloshchuk	(Luxembourg) Marie Weckerle (Canada) Katherine Sebov (India) Ankita Raina; Sofya Lansere
June 3	La Marsa, Tunisia; Hard; W50; Singles and doubles draws	(China) Gao Xinyu; 5–7, 6–3, 6–3	(Poland) Martyna Kubka	(France) Manon Léonard (United States) Madison Sieg	(Georgia (country)) Mariam Bolkvadze; Mariia Tkacheva (Mexico) Ana Sofía Sánchez (France) Yasmine Mansouri
June 3	La Marsa, Tunisia; Hard; W50; Singles and doubles draws	Aglaya Fedorova; Kira Pavlova; 6–7^{(5–7)}, 6–1, [10–3]	(Slovakia) Katarína Kužmová (France) Yasmine Mansouri	(France) Manon Léonard (United States) Madison Sieg	(Georgia (country)) Mariam Bolkvadze; Mariia Tkacheva (Mexico) Ana Sofía Sánchez (France) Yasmine Mansouri
June 3	Kuršumlijska Banja, Serbia; Clay; W35; Singles and doubles draws	(Serbia) Nina Stojanović; 6–2, 6–4	(United States) Vivian Wolff	(Japan) Yuki Naito; Ksenia Laskutova	(France) Émeline Dartron (Serbia) Anja Stanković (Sweden) Caijsa Hennemann (Serbia) Mia Ristić
June 3	Kuršumlijska Banja, Serbia; Clay; W35; Singles and doubles draws	(Japan) Mana Kawamura (Japan) Yuki Naito; 6–4, 6–4	(Algeria) Inès Ibbou (Serbia) Elena Milovanović	(Japan) Yuki Naito; Ksenia Laskutova	(France) Émeline Dartron (Serbia) Anja Stanković (Sweden) Caijsa Hennemann (Serbia) Mia Ristić
June 3	Daegu, South Korea; Hard; W35; Singles and doubles draws	(South Korea) Back Da-yeon; 4–6, 6–2, 6–3	(Japan) Eri Shimizu	(Japan) Sakura Hosogi (United States) Hina Inoue	(Japan) Rina Saigo (Japan) Ayano Shimizu (Australia) Petra Hule (South Korea) Cherry Kim
June 3	Daegu, South Korea; Hard; W35; Singles and doubles draws	(Japan) Ayano Shimizu (Japan) Kisa Yoshioka; 6–4, 6–3	(South Korea) Kim Da-bin (South Korea) Kim Na-ri	(Japan) Sakura Hosogi (United States) Hina Inoue	(Japan) Rina Saigo (Japan) Ayano Shimizu (Australia) Petra Hule (South Korea) Cherry Kim
June 3	Banja Luka, Bosnia and Herzegovina; Clay; W15; Singles and doubles draws	(Slovenia) Živa Falkner; 6–4, 6–4	(Serbia) Luna Vujović	(Czech Republic) Denise Hrdinková (Czech Republic) Amélie Šmejkalová	(Switzerland) Marie Mettraux (Serbia) Andrea Obradović (Turkey) Doğa Türkmen (Switzerland) Katerina Tsygourova
June 3	Banja Luka, Bosnia and Herzegovina; Clay; W15; Singles and doubles draws	(Czech Republic) Denisa Hindová (Italy) Vittoria Modesti; 6–2, 3–6, [10–7]	(Switzerland) Marie Mettraux (Turkey) Doğa Türkmen	(Czech Republic) Denise Hrdinková (Czech Republic) Amélie Šmejkalová	(Switzerland) Marie Mettraux (Serbia) Andrea Obradović (Turkey) Doğa Türkmen (Switzerland) Katerina Tsygourova
June 3	Maringá, Brazil; Clay; W15; Singles and doubles draws	(Argentina) Jazmín Ortenzi; 6–4, 6–3	(Peru) Lucciana Pérez Alarcón	(Argentina) Sol Ailin Larraya Guidi (Argentina) Berta Bonardi	(Ecuador) Camila Romero (Brazil) Geórgia Gulin (United States) Amy Zhu (Argentina) Luisina Giovannini
June 3	Maringá, Brazil; Clay; W15; Singles and doubles draws	(Argentina) Jazmín Ortenzi (Peru) Lucciana Pérez Alarcón; 6–2, 6–1	(Brazil) Camilla Bossi (Brazil) Letícia Garcia Vidal	(Argentina) Sol Ailin Larraya Guidi (Argentina) Berta Bonardi	(Ecuador) Camila Romero (Brazil) Geórgia Gulin (United States) Amy Zhu (Argentina) Luisina Giovannini
June 3	Santo Domingo, Dominican Republic; Hard; W15; Singles and doubles draws	(Germany) Antonia Schmidt; 4–6, 6–2, 7–5	(Czech Republic) Darja Viďmanová	(Ecuador) Mell Reasco (Dominican Republic) Ana Carmen Zamburek	(Mexico) Jessica Hinojosa Gómez (Bolivia) Noelia Zeballos (India) Riya Bhatia (Poland) Olivia Lincer
June 3	Santo Domingo, Dominican Republic; Hard; W15; Singles and doubles draws	(Mexico) Julia García (United States) Sofía Camila Rojas; 6–4, 7–6^{(8–6)}	(Mexico) Jessica Hinojosa Gómez (Bolivia) Noelia Zeballos	(Ecuador) Mell Reasco (Dominican Republic) Ana Carmen Zamburek	(Mexico) Jessica Hinojosa Gómez (Bolivia) Noelia Zeballos (India) Riya Bhatia (Poland) Olivia Lincer
June 3	Kawaguchi, Japan; Hard; W15; Singles and doubles draws	(Japan) Aoi Ito; 6–1, 6–4	(Japan) Mao Mushika	(Japan) Funa Kozaki (Japan) Kanako Morisaki	(Japan) Kurumi Tamura (Japan) Chihiro Muramatsu (Japan) Ayumi Miyamoto (Japan) Shiho Akita
June 3	Kawaguchi, Japan; Hard; W15; Singles and doubles draws	(Japan) Mao Mushika (Japan) Mio Mushika; 6–2, 6–2	(Japan) Anri Nagata (China) Yuan Chengyiyi	(Japan) Funa Kozaki (Japan) Kanako Morisaki	(Japan) Kurumi Tamura (Japan) Chihiro Muramatsu (Japan) Ayumi Miyamoto (Japan) Shiho Akita
June 3	Focșani, Romania; Clay; W15; Singles and doubles draws	(Romania) Patricia Maria Țig; 6–4, 6–4	(Romania) Bianca Bărbulescu	(Romania) Briana Szabó (Italy) Anastasia Bertacchi	(Romania) Lavinia Tănăsie (Czech Republic) Kateřina Mandelíková (Romania) Eva Maria Ionescu (Romania) Anamaria Oana
June 3	Focșani, Romania; Clay; W15; Singles and doubles draws	(Czech Republic) Kateřina Mandelíková (Romania) Briana Szabó; 7–6^{(7–3)}, 6–0	(Argentina) Victoria Bosio (Romania) Patricia Maria Țig	(Romania) Briana Szabó (Italy) Anastasia Bertacchi	(Romania) Lavinia Tănăsie (Czech Republic) Kateřina Mandelíková (Romania) Eva Maria Ionescu (Romania) Anamaria Oana
June 3	Madrid, Spain; Hard; W15; Singles and doubles draws	(France) Lucie Nguyen Tan; 6–1, 6–4	(Switzerland) Alina Granwehr	(Peru) Anastasia Iamachkine (United States) Kennedy Gibbs	(United Kingdom) Ella McDonald; Maria Andrienko (Spain) Cayetana Gay (Republic of Ireland) Celine Simunyu
June 3	Madrid, Spain; Hard; W15; Singles and doubles draws	(United Kingdom) Holly Hutchinson (United Kingdom) Ella McDonald; 6–4, 6–1	(Brazil) Ana Candiotto (Peru) Anastasia Iamachkine	(Peru) Anastasia Iamachkine (United States) Kennedy Gibbs	(United Kingdom) Ella McDonald; Maria Andrienko (Spain) Cayetana Gay (Republic of Ireland) Celine Simunyu
June 3	Monastir, Tunisia; Hard; W15; Singles and doubles draws	(Indonesia) Janice Tjen; 6–1, 7–6^{(7–1)}	(Lithuania) Patricija Paukštytė	(India) Zeel Desai (Italy) Samira De Stefano	(Thailand) Salakthip Ounmuang (Belgium) Eliessa Vanlangendonck (Germany) Gina Marie Dittmann; Anna Kubareva
June 3	Monastir, Tunisia; Hard; W15; Singles and doubles draws	(Canada) Leena Bennetto (Indonesia) Janice Tjen; 6–4, 6–1	(Lithuania) Patricija Paukštytė (Slovakia) Alica Rusová	(India) Zeel Desai (Italy) Samira De Stefano	(Thailand) Salakthip Ounmuang (Belgium) Eliessa Vanlangendonck (Germany) Gina Marie Dittmann; Anna Kubareva
June 3	San Diego, United States; Hard; W15; Singles and doubles draws	(United States) Sara Daavettila; 6–0, 6–0	(United States) Maya Iyengar	(United States) Carolyn Campana (United States) Aspen Schuman	(United States) Dasha Ivanova (United States) Julieta Pareja (United States) Katie Codd (United States) Anna Campana
June 3	San Diego, United States; Hard; W15; Singles and doubles draws	(United States) Carolyn Campana (Sweden) Lisa Zaar; 6–7^{(3–7)}, 6–4, [11–9]	(United States) Eryn Cayetano (Australia) Lily Fairclough	(United States) Carolyn Campana (United States) Aspen Schuman	(United States) Dasha Ivanova (United States) Julieta Pareja (United States) Katie Codd (United States) Anna Campana
June 10	Open de Biarritz; Biarritz, France; Clay; W100; Singles – Doubles	(Japan) Sara Saito; 5–7, 6–3, 6–3	(France) Margaux Rouvroy	(Greece) Despina Papamichail (France) Amandine Hesse	(Romania) Andreea Mitu (Andorra) Victoria Jiménez Kasintseva (France) Elsa Jacquemot (China) You Xiaodi
June 10	Open de Biarritz; Biarritz, France; Clay; W100; Singles – Doubles	(Romania) Irina Bara (Romania) Andreea Mitu; 6–3, 3–6, [10–7]	(France) Estelle Cascino (France) Carole Monnet	(Greece) Despina Papamichail (France) Amandine Hesse	(Romania) Andreea Mitu (Andorra) Victoria Jiménez Kasintseva (France) Elsa Jacquemot (China) You Xiaodi
June 10	Guimarães Ladies Open; Guimarães, Portugal; Hard; W75; Singles – Doubles	(Portugal) Francisca Jorge; 6–3, 6–4	(United States) Liv Hovde	(Canada) Katherine Sebov (Georgia (country)) Mariam Bolkvadze	(Netherlands) Arianne Hartono (Czech Republic) Gabriela Knutson (France) Tessah Andrianjafitrimo (Portugal) Matilde Jorge
June 10	Guimarães Ladies Open; Guimarães, Portugal; Hard; W75; Singles – Doubles	(United States) Sophie Chang (United States) Rasheeda McAdoo; 7–6^{(8–6)}, 6–7^{(2–7)}, [10–5]	(Portugal) Francisca Jorge (Portugal) Matilde Jorge	(Canada) Katherine Sebov (Georgia (country)) Mariam Bolkvadze	(Netherlands) Arianne Hartono (Czech Republic) Gabriela Knutson (France) Tessah Andrianjafitrimo (Portugal) Matilde Jorge
June 10	Taizhou, China; Hard; W50; Singles and doubles draws	(China) Shi Han; 2–6, 7–5, 6–2	(China) Lu Jiajing	(South Korea) Park So-hyun (China) Wang Qiang	(China) Yang Yidi (China) Liu Fangzhou (China) Guo Meiqi (Chinese Taipei) Liang En-shuo
June 10	Taizhou, China; Hard; W50; Singles and doubles draws	(Chinese Taipei) Cho I-hsuan (Chinese Taipei) Cho Yi-tsen; 2–6, 7–6^{(7–5)}, [10–7]	(China) Wang Meiling (China) Yao Xinxin	(South Korea) Park So-hyun (China) Wang Qiang	(China) Yang Yidi (China) Liu Fangzhou (China) Guo Meiqi (Chinese Taipei) Liang En-shuo
June 10	Gdańsk, Poland; Clay; W35; Singles and doubles draws	(Czech Republic) Barbora Palicová; 6–2, 1–0 ret.	(Sweden) Kajsa Rinaldo Persson	(Switzerland) Jenny Dürst (Japan) Yuki Naito	(Belgium) Hanne Vandewinkel (Turkey) Berfu Cengiz (France) Alice Tubello (Poland) Marcelina Podlińska
June 10	Gdańsk, Poland; Clay; W35; Singles and doubles draws	(Czech Republic) Karolína Kubáňová (Czech Republic) Renata Voráčová; 3–6, 7–6^{(7–5)}, [10–7]	(Australia) Jaimee Fourlis (Australia) Petra Hule	(Switzerland) Jenny Dürst (Japan) Yuki Naito	(Belgium) Hanne Vandewinkel (Turkey) Berfu Cengiz (France) Alice Tubello (Poland) Marcelina Podlińska
June 10	Santo Domingo, Dominican Republic; Hard; W15; Singles and doubles draws	(Poland) Olivia Lincer; 7–6^{(7–4)}, 6–1	(United States) Katja Wiersholm	(United States) Esther Vyrlan (Mexico) Julia García	(United States) Kolie Allen (Dominican Republic) Ana Carmen Zamburek (United States) Christasha McNeil (Czech Republic) Darja Viďmanová
June 10	Santo Domingo, Dominican Republic; Hard; W15; Singles and doubles draws	(Canada) Raphaëlle Lacasse (Dominican Republic) Ana Carmen Zamburek; 6–3, 6–4	(India) Sharmada Balu (India) Riya Bhatia	(United States) Esther Vyrlan (Mexico) Julia García	(United States) Kolie Allen (Dominican Republic) Ana Carmen Zamburek (United States) Christasha McNeil (Czech Republic) Darja Viďmanová
June 10	Norges-la-Ville, France; Hard; W15; Singles and doubles draws	(Switzerland) Alina Granwehr; 5–7, 6–3, 7–6^{(7–5)}	Ekaterina Ovcharenko	(France) Léa Tholey (France) Marine Szostak	(United Kingdom) Holly Hutchinson (Spain) Berta Passola (Italy) Chiara Girelli (Switzerland) Fiona Ganz
June 10	Norges-la-Ville, France; Hard; W15; Singles and doubles draws	Ekaterina Ovcharenko; Kristiana Sidorova; 6–4, 6–3	(Switzerland) Alina Granwehr (Republic of Ireland) Celine Simunyu	(France) Léa Tholey (France) Marine Szostak	(United Kingdom) Holly Hutchinson (Spain) Berta Passola (Italy) Chiara Girelli (Switzerland) Fiona Ganz
June 10	Tokyo, Japan; Hard; W15; Singles and doubles draws	(Japan) Rina Saigo; 4–6, 7–6^{(7–5)}, 7–5	(Japan) Shiho Akita	(Japan) Lisa-Marie Rioux (Japan) Akiko Omae	(Japan) Kisa Yoshioka (Japan) Chihiro Muramatsu (Japan) Mio Mushika (Japan) Hikaru Sato
June 10	Tokyo, Japan; Hard; W15; Singles and doubles draws	(Japan) Akari Inoue (Japan) Michika Ozeki; 2–6, 7–5, [10–8]	(Japan) Ayumi Miyamoto (Japan) Anri Nagata	(Japan) Lisa-Marie Rioux (Japan) Akiko Omae	(Japan) Kisa Yoshioka (Japan) Chihiro Muramatsu (Japan) Mio Mushika (Japan) Hikaru Sato
June 10	Kuršumlijska Banja, Serbia; Clay; W15; Singles and doubles draws	(Sweden) Caijsa Hennemann; 2–6, 6–4, 6–1	(Australia) Kaylah McPhee	(Serbia) Anja Stanković; Ksenia Laskutova	(France) Yaroslava Bartashevich; Alexandra Shubladze (Ukraine) Kateryna Lazarenko (Turkey) Pemra Özgen
June 10	Kuršumlijska Banja, Serbia; Clay; W15; Singles and doubles draws	Ksenia Laskutova; Alexandra Shubladze; 6–4, 7–5	(Australia) Kaylah McPhee (Poland) Zuzanna Pawlikowska	(Serbia) Anja Stanković; Ksenia Laskutova	(France) Yaroslava Bartashevich; Alexandra Shubladze (Ukraine) Kateryna Lazarenko (Turkey) Pemra Özgen
June 10	Madrid, Spain; Clay; W15; Singles and doubles draws	(Spain) Kaitlin Quevedo; 6–3, 2–0 ret.	(Spain) Noelia Bouzó Zanotti	(Germany) Carolina Kuhl (Italy) Francesca Pace	(France) Eleejah Inisan (Italy) Angelica Raggi (Spain) Cristina Ramos Sierra (France) Lucie Nguyen Tan
June 10	Madrid, Spain; Clay; W15; Singles and doubles draws	(Colombia) María Herazo González (Italy) Francesca Pace; 6–3, 7–5	(Italy) Diletta Cherubini (Germany) Carolina Kuhl	(Germany) Carolina Kuhl (Italy) Francesca Pace	(France) Eleejah Inisan (Italy) Angelica Raggi (Spain) Cristina Ramos Sierra (France) Lucie Nguyen Tan
June 10	Monastir, Tunisia; Hard; W15; Singles and doubles draws	(Indonesia) Janice Tjen; 6–2, 6–3	Anna Kubareva	(Slovakia) Katarína Kužmová (France) Yasmine Mansouri	(United Kingdom) Eleanor Dean; Mariia Tkacheva (Lithuania) Patricija Paukštytė (United States) Kate Mansfield
June 10	Monastir, Tunisia; Hard; W15; Singles and doubles draws	(Slovakia) Katarína Kužmová; Mariia Tkacheva; 6–1, 6–1	(Lithuania) Patricija Paukštytė (Egypt) Merna Refaat	(Slovakia) Katarína Kužmová (France) Yasmine Mansouri	(United Kingdom) Eleanor Dean; Mariia Tkacheva (Lithuania) Patricija Paukštytė (United States) Kate Mansfield
June 10	San Diego, United States; Hard; W15; Singles and doubles draws	(United States) Fiona Crawley; 6–4, 1–6, 6–3	(United States) Sara Daavettila	(United States) Eryn Cayetano (United States) Alyssa Ahn	(Turkey) Başak Eraydın (United States) Anne-Christine Lütkemeyer (Hong Kong) Cody Wong (United States) Haley Giavara
June 10	San Diego, United States; Hard; W15; Singles and doubles draws	(Turkey) Başak Eraydın (Ukraine) Anita Sahdiieva; 0–6, 6–3, [10–8]	(United States) Anna Campana (United States) Carolyn Campana	(United States) Eryn Cayetano (United States) Alyssa Ahn	(Turkey) Başak Eraydın (United States) Anne-Christine Lütkemeyer (Hong Kong) Cody Wong (United States) Haley Giavara
June 17	Ilkley Trophy; Ilkley, United Kingdom; Grass; W100; Singles – Doubles	(Canada) Rebecca Marino; 4–6, 6–1, 6–4	(France) Jessika Ponchet	(Australia) Kimberly Birrell (France) Elsa Jacquemot	(United Kingdom) Sonay Kartal (Ukraine) Daria Snigur (Canada) Marina Stakusic (United Kingdom) Ella McDonald
June 17	Ilkley Trophy; Ilkley, United Kingdom; Grass; W100; Singles – Doubles	(France) Kristina Mladenovic (Romania) Elena-Gabriela Ruse; 6–2, 6–2	(United States) Quinn Gleason (China) Tang Qianhui	(Australia) Kimberly Birrell (France) Elsa Jacquemot	(United Kingdom) Sonay Kartal (Ukraine) Daria Snigur (Canada) Marina Stakusic (United Kingdom) Ella McDonald
June 17	ITS Cup; Olomouc, Czech Republic; Clay; W75; Singles – Doubles	(Hungary) Anna Bondár; 6–3, 7–6^{(7–4)}	(South Korea) Jang Su-jeong	(Germany) Carolina Kuhl (Czech Republic) Julie Paštiková	(Liechtenstein) Kathinka von Deichmann (Greece) Valentini Grammatikopoulou (Spain) Leyre Romero Gormaz (Hungary) Panna Udvardy
June 17	ITS Cup; Olomouc, Czech Republic; Clay; W75; Singles – Doubles	Amina Anshba (Greece) Valentini Grammatikopoulou; 6–2, 6–4	(United States) Jessie Aney (Germany) Lena Papadakis	(Germany) Carolina Kuhl (Czech Republic) Julie Paštiková	(Liechtenstein) Kathinka von Deichmann (Greece) Valentini Grammatikopoulou (Spain) Leyre Romero Gormaz (Hungary) Panna Udvardy
June 17	Ystad, Sweden; Clay; W50; Singles and doubles draws	(Turkey) Berfu Cengiz; 6–3, 3–6, 6–3	(Spain) Irene Burillo Escorihuela	(Australia) Seone Mendez (Spain) Andrea Lázaro García	(France) Séléna Janicijevic (Spain) Ángela Fita Boluda (France) Alice Tubello (Belgium) Marie Benoît
June 17	Ystad, Sweden; Clay; W50; Singles and doubles draws	(Belgium) Marie Benoît (Netherlands) Lesley Pattinama Kerkhove; 6–3, 6–1	Alevtina Ibragimova; Anna Zyryanova	(Australia) Seone Mendez (Spain) Andrea Lázaro García	(France) Séléna Janicijevic (Spain) Ángela Fita Boluda (France) Alice Tubello (Belgium) Marie Benoît
June 17	Luzhou, China; Hard; W35; Singles and doubles draws	Anastasia Zolotareva; 6–2, 6–4	(China) Yao Xinxin	(Slovakia) Viktória Morvayová (China) Liu Fangzhou	Tatiana Prozorova (China) Huang Jiaqi (China) Yang Yidi (China) Lu Jiajing
June 17	Luzhou, China; Hard; W35; Singles and doubles draws	(China) Huang Yujia (China) Xiao Zhenghua; 7–6^{(7–5)}, 6–0	(China) Sun Yufan (China) Wang Meiling	(Slovakia) Viktória Morvayová (China) Liu Fangzhou	Tatiana Prozorova (China) Huang Jiaqi (China) Yang Yidi (China) Lu Jiajing
June 17	Tauste, Spain; Hard; W35+H; Singles and doubles draws	(Australia) Melisa Ercan; 6–3, 6–0	(Mexico) Victoria Rodríguez	(China) Tian Fangran (Japan) Sayaka Ishii	(India) Rutuja Bhosale (Netherlands) Eva Vedder (Austria) Tamara Kostic (Spain) Lucía Cortez Llorca
June 17	Tauste, Spain; Hard; W35+H; Singles and doubles draws	(India) Rutuja Bhosale (China) Tian Fangran; 6–2, 6–4	(Australia) Alana Parnaby (Mexico) Victoria Rodríguez	(China) Tian Fangran (Japan) Sayaka Ishii	(India) Rutuja Bhosale (Netherlands) Eva Vedder (Austria) Tamara Kostic (Spain) Lucía Cortez Llorca
June 17	Taipei, Taiwan; Hard; W35; Singles and doubles draws	(Japan) Himeno Sakatsume; 6–4, 6–0	(Japan) Kyōka Okamura	(Australia) Lizette Cabrera (Thailand) Thasaporn Naklo	(South Korea) Park So-hyun (Japan) Misaki Matsuda (Japan) Haruna Arakawa (Chinese Taipei) Liang En-shuo
June 17	Taipei, Taiwan; Hard; W35; Singles and doubles draws	(Japan) Eri Shimizu (Japan) Ikumi Yamazaki; 4–6, 6–1, [10–5]	(Japan) Funa Kozaki (Japan) Misaki Matsuda	(Australia) Lizette Cabrera (Thailand) Thasaporn Naklo	(South Korea) Park So-hyun (Japan) Misaki Matsuda (Japan) Haruna Arakawa (Chinese Taipei) Liang En-shuo
June 17	Wichita, United States; Hard; W35; Singles and doubles draws	(Canada) Cadence Brace; 7–5, 4–6, 6–3	(United States) Victoria Hu	(India) Sahaja Yamalapalli (United States) Jessica Failla	(Japan) Hiroko Kuwata (Poland) Olivia Lincer (Canada) Kayla Cross (United States) Kate Fakih
June 17	Wichita, United States; Hard; W35; Singles and doubles draws	(Spain) Alicia Herrero Liñana (Argentina) Melany Krywoj; 6–3, 6–3	(United States) Ashton Bowers (United States) Sophia Webster	(India) Sahaja Yamalapalli (United States) Jessica Failla	(Japan) Hiroko Kuwata (Poland) Olivia Lincer (Canada) Kayla Cross (United States) Kate Fakih
June 17	Bucharest, Romania; Clay; W15; Singles and doubles draws	(Romania) Georgia Crăciun; 6–1 ret.	(Romania) Patricia Maria Țig	(Italy) Camilla Gennaro (Bulgaria) Lidia Encheva	(Latvia) Kamilla Bartone (Romania) Oana Gavrilă (Bulgaria) Iva Ivanova (Romania) Maia Ilinca Burcescu
June 17	Bucharest, Romania; Clay; W15; Singles and doubles draws	(Bulgaria) Iva Ivanova (United States) Mia Slama; 4–6, 6–2, [10–4]	(Romania) Diana Maria Mihail (Romania) Patricia Maria Țig	(Italy) Camilla Gennaro (Bulgaria) Lidia Encheva	(Latvia) Kamilla Bartone (Romania) Oana Gavrilă (Bulgaria) Iva Ivanova (Romania) Maia Ilinca Burcescu
June 17	Kuršumlijska Banja, Serbia; Clay; W15; Singles and doubles draws	Alexandra Shubladze; 6–2, 1–0 ret.	(Serbia) Natalija Senić	(Serbia) Petra Konjikušić (Bosnia and Herzegovina) Suana Tucaković	(Serbia) Teodora Kostović (Serbia) Anja Stanković (Serbia) Draginja Vuković (Germany) Amelie Justine Hejtmanek
June 17	Kuršumlijska Banja, Serbia; Clay; W15; Singles and doubles draws	(Serbia) Natalija Senić (Serbia) Anja Stanković; 7–6^{(7–5)}, 7–6^{(7–4)}	Ksenia Laskutova; Alexandra Shubladze	(Serbia) Petra Konjikušić (Bosnia and Herzegovina) Suana Tucaković	(Serbia) Teodora Kostović (Serbia) Anja Stanković (Serbia) Draginja Vuković (Germany) Amelie Justine Hejtmanek
June 17	Hillcrest, South Africa; Hard; W15; Singles and doubles draws	(Italy) Matilde Mariani; 6–2, 6–3	(Denmark) Elena Jamshidi	(Sweden) Jacqueline Cabaj Awad (Italy) Lara Pfeifer	(Japan) Haine Ogata (Japan) Michika Ozeki (South Africa) Jahnie van Zyl (Japan) Nagomi Higashitani
June 17	Hillcrest, South Africa; Hard; W15; Singles and doubles draws	(Italy) Matilde Mariani (Italy) Beatrice Stagno; 7–5, 4–6, [10–6]	(Japan) Nagomi Higashitani (Japan) Michika Ozeki	(Sweden) Jacqueline Cabaj Awad (Italy) Lara Pfeifer	(Japan) Haine Ogata (Japan) Michika Ozeki (South Africa) Jahnie van Zyl (Japan) Nagomi Higashitani
June 17	Monastir, Tunisia; Hard; W15; Singles and doubles draws	(Indonesia) Janice Tjen; 6–1, 6–0	(France) Marine Szostak	(United States) Kate Mansfield (Japan) Rinko Matsuda	(Belgium) Margaux Maquet (Egypt) Lamis Alhussein Abdel Aziz (Egypt) Merna Refaat (France) Yasmine Mansouri
June 17	Monastir, Tunisia; Hard; W15; Singles and doubles draws	(United States) Julia Adams (Canada) Leena Bennetto; 4–6, 7–5, [10–4]	(Egypt) Lamis Alhussein Abdel Aziz (Egypt) Merna Refaat	(United States) Kate Mansfield (Japan) Rinko Matsuda	(Belgium) Margaux Maquet (Egypt) Lamis Alhussein Abdel Aziz (Egypt) Merna Refaat (France) Yasmine Mansouri
June 17	Rancho Santa Fe, United States; Hard; W15; Singles and doubles draws	(United States) Julieta Pareja; 5–7, 6–1, 6–4	(United States) Kimmi Hance	(United States) Anne-Christine Lütkemeyer (Australia) Lily Fairclough	(United States) Anna Campana (Turkey) Başak Eraydın (United States) Brandy Walker (United States) Sara Daavettila
June 17	Rancho Santa Fe, United States; Hard; W15; Singles and doubles draws	(United States) Anna Campana (United States) Carolyn Campana; 6–2, 6–3	(Canada) Jessica Luisa Alsola (United States) Brandy Walker	(United States) Anne-Christine Lütkemeyer (Australia) Lily Fairclough	(United States) Anna Campana (Turkey) Başak Eraydın (United States) Brandy Walker (United States) Sara Daavettila
June 24	Macha Lake Open; Staré Splavy, Czech Republic; Clay; W75; Singles – Doubles	(Czech Republic) Tereza Valentová; 6–3, 7–5	(Czech Republic) Aneta Kučmová	(South Korea) Jang Su-jeong (Spain) Guiomar Maristany	Kristina Dmitruk (Andorra) Victoria Jiménez Kasintseva (Netherlands) Anouk Koevermans (Poland) Maja Chwalińska
June 24	Macha Lake Open; Staré Splavy, Czech Republic; Clay; W75; Singles – Doubles	(Poland) Maja Chwalińska (Czech Republic) Anastasia Dețiuc; 6–3, 2–6, [10–6]	(China) Feng Shuo (Greece) Sapfo Sakellaridi	(South Korea) Jang Su-jeong (Spain) Guiomar Maristany	Kristina Dmitruk (Andorra) Victoria Jiménez Kasintseva (Netherlands) Anouk Koevermans (Poland) Maja Chwalińska
June 24	Palma del Río, Spain; Hard; W50; Singles and doubles draws	(Czech Republic) Linda Klimovičová; 7–5, 6–4	(Switzerland) Leonie Küng	(Australia) Melisa Ercan (China) Tian Fangran	(France) Nahia Berecoechea (Japan) Sayaka Ishii; Anastasiia Gureva (Germany) Caroline Werner
June 24	Palma del Río, Spain; Hard; W50; Singles and doubles draws	(Poland) Martyna Kubka (Belgium) Lara Salden; 6–2, 6–1	(India) Rutuja Bhosale (United States) Sophie Chang	(Australia) Melisa Ercan (China) Tian Fangran	(France) Nahia Berecoechea (Japan) Sayaka Ishii; Anastasiia Gureva (Germany) Caroline Werner
June 24	Périgueux, France; Clay; W35; Singles and doubles draws	(France) Emma Léné; 3–6, 6–4, 6–4	(France) Alice Tubello	(Belgium) Marie Benoît; Alevtina Ibragimova	(France) Yaroslava Bartashevich (France) Amandine Monnot (France) Émeline Dartron (Greece) Michaela Laki
June 24	Périgueux, France; Clay; W35; Singles and doubles draws	(Croatia) Mariana Dražić; Alevtina Ibragimova; 7–5, 2–6, [10–5]	(France) Émeline Dartron (France) Jenny Lim	(Belgium) Marie Benoît; Alevtina Ibragimova	(France) Yaroslava Bartashevich (France) Amandine Monnot (France) Émeline Dartron (Greece) Michaela Laki
June 24	Tarvisio, Italy; Clay; W35; Singles and doubles draws	(Italy) Nuria Brancaccio; 6–4, 6–2	(Italy) Dalila Spiteri	(Italy) Nicole Fossa Huergo (Ukraine) Oleksandra Oliynykova	Maria Kozyreva (Italy) Miriana Tona (Italy) Diletta Cherubini (Brazil) Gabriela Cé
June 24	Tarvisio, Italy; Clay; W35; Singles and doubles draws	Anastasia Sukhotina; Anna Zyryanova; 7–6^{(7–3)}, 6–2	(Slovenia) Živa Falkner (Italy) Miriana Tona	(Italy) Nicole Fossa Huergo (Ukraine) Oleksandra Oliynykova	Maria Kozyreva (Italy) Miriana Tona (Italy) Diletta Cherubini (Brazil) Gabriela Cé
June 24	Klosters, Switzerland; Clay; W35; Singles and doubles draws	(Poland) Gina Feistel; 6–7^{(9–11)}, 6–2, 6–1	(Switzerland) Jenny Dürst	(France) Diana Martynov (Germany) Alexandra Vecic	(Netherlands) Jasmijn Gimbrère (Italy) Lisa Pigato (Germany) Katharina Hobgarski (Australia) Tina Nadine Smith
June 24	Klosters, Switzerland; Clay; W35; Singles and doubles draws	(Switzerland) Jenny Dürst (Slovakia) Nina Vargová; 6–2, 4–6, [10–8]	(Germany) Katharina Hobgarski (Germany) Antonia Schmidt	(France) Diana Martynov (Germany) Alexandra Vecic	(Netherlands) Jasmijn Gimbrère (Italy) Lisa Pigato (Germany) Katharina Hobgarski (Australia) Tina Nadine Smith
June 24	Taipei, Taiwan; Hard; W35; Singles and doubles draws	(India) Vaidehi Chaudari; 3–6, 7–5, 6–3	(Japan) Kyōka Okamura	(New Zealand) Monique Barry (Japan) Ayano Shimizu	(Japan) Himeno Sakatsume; Tatiana Prozorova (Japan) Mei Yamaguchi (Japan) Lisa-Marie Rioux
June 24	Taipei, Taiwan; Hard; W35; Singles and doubles draws	(Chinese Taipei) Cho I-hsuan (Chinese Taipei) Cho Yi-tsen; 6–2, 1–6, [10–5]	(Chinese Taipei) Hsieh Yu-Chieh (Chinese Taipei) Lin Fang An	(New Zealand) Monique Barry (Japan) Ayano Shimizu	(Japan) Himeno Sakatsume; Tatiana Prozorova (Japan) Mei Yamaguchi (Japan) Lisa-Marie Rioux
June 24	Tianjin, China; Hard; W15; Singles and doubles draws	(China) Yang Yidi; 6–1, 6–4	Elina Nepliy	(China) Aitiyaguli Aixirefu (South Korea) Ahn Yu-jin	(China) Zhou Yehua (China) Huang Jiaqi (South Korea) Kim Na-ri (China) Wang Xintong
June 24	Tianjin, China; Hard; W15; Singles and doubles draws	(South Korea) Kim Da-bin (South Korea) Kim Na-ri; 6–2, 6–1	(China) Xun Fangying (China) Yuan Chengyiyi	(China) Aitiyaguli Aixirefu (South Korea) Ahn Yu-jin	(China) Zhou Yehua (China) Huang Jiaqi (South Korea) Kim Na-ri (China) Wang Xintong
June 24	Kamen, Germany; Clay; W15; Singles and doubles draws	(Netherlands) Stéphanie Visscher; 6–2, 6–2	(Germany) Eva Bennemann	(Germany) Julia Middendorf (Germany) Luisa Meyer auf der Heide	(Germany) Tessa Brockmann (Italy) Gaia Squarcialupi (Germany) Josy Daems (Germany) Paula Rumpf
June 24	Kamen, Germany; Clay; W15; Singles and doubles draws	(Germany) Josy Daems (Ukraine) Anastasiia Firman; 6–3, 6–3	(Germany) Marie Vogt (Germany) Eva Marie Voracek	(Germany) Julia Middendorf (Germany) Luisa Meyer auf der Heide	(Germany) Tessa Brockmann (Italy) Gaia Squarcialupi (Germany) Josy Daems (Germany) Paula Rumpf
June 24	Hong Kong, Hong Kong; Hard; W15; Singles and doubles draws	(Indonesia) Priska Nugroho; 6–3, 6–4	(Japan) Saki Imamura	(Japan) Mio Mushika; Anastasia Zolotareva	(Japan) Mao Mushika (Hong Kong) Maggie Ng (Hong Kong) Cody Wong; Anastasia Kovaleva
June 24	Hong Kong, Hong Kong; Hard; W15; Singles and doubles draws	(Japan) Hiromi Abe (Japan) Saki Imamura; 6–4, 6–1	(China) Dang Yiming; Anastasia Zolotareva	(Japan) Mio Mushika; Anastasia Zolotareva	(Japan) Mao Mushika (Hong Kong) Maggie Ng (Hong Kong) Cody Wong; Anastasia Kovaleva
June 24	Alkmaar, Netherlands; Clay; W15; Singles and doubles draws	(Germany) Fabienne Gettwart; 7–6^{(7–2)}, 7–5	(Poland) Daria Kuczer	(Germany) Angelina Wirges (Germany) Selina Dal	(New Zealand) Valentina Ivanov (Belgium) Tilwith Di Girolami (Spain) Cristina Díaz Adrover (Netherlands) Rose Marie Nijkamp
June 24	Alkmaar, Netherlands; Clay; W15; Singles and doubles draws	(Netherlands) Michaëlla Krajicek (Netherlands) Sarah van Emst; 6–4, 6–4	(New Zealand) Valentina Ivanov (Denmark) Rebecca Munk Mortensen	(Germany) Angelina Wirges (Germany) Selina Dal	(New Zealand) Valentina Ivanov (Belgium) Tilwith Di Girolami (Spain) Cristina Díaz Adrover (Netherlands) Rose Marie Nijkamp
June 24	Kuršumlijska Banja, Serbia; Clay; W15; Singles and doubles draws	(Serbia) Natalija Senić; 6–3, 6–2	(Serbia) Anja Stanković	(Bulgaria) Julia Stamatova (Bulgaria) Dia Evtimova	(Spain) Lucía Natal (Ukraine) Anastasiya Zaparyniuk (Spain) Claudia Hoste Ferrer (Romania) Oana Gavrilă
June 24	Kuršumlijska Banja, Serbia; Clay; W15; Singles and doubles draws	(Slovakia) Laura Cíleková (Slovakia) Natália Kročková; 6–4, 5–7, [10–3]	Victoria Borodulina; Ekaterina Kazionova	(Bulgaria) Julia Stamatova (Bulgaria) Dia Evtimova	(Spain) Lucía Natal (Ukraine) Anastasiya Zaparyniuk (Spain) Claudia Hoste Ferrer (Romania) Oana Gavrilă
June 24	Hillcrest, South Africa; Hard; W15; Singles and doubles draws	(South Africa) Isabella Kruger; 6–2, 6–4	(Japan) Michika Ozeki	(Japan) Nagomi Higashitani (Belgium) Eliessa Vanlangendonck	(South Africa) Jahnie van Zyl (Italy) Beatrice Stagno (Japan) Haine Ogata (Denmark) Elena Jamshidi
June 24	Hillcrest, South Africa; Hard; W15; Singles and doubles draws	(Italy) Matilde Mariani (Italy) Beatrice Stagno; 6–4, 6–2	(Mexico) Amanda Carolina Nava Elkin (Japan) Haine Ogata	(Japan) Nagomi Higashitani (Belgium) Eliessa Vanlangendonck	(South Africa) Jahnie van Zyl (Italy) Beatrice Stagno (Japan) Haine Ogata (Denmark) Elena Jamshidi
June 24	Monastir, Tunisia; Hard; W15; Singles and doubles draws	Anastasia Gasanova; 6–2, 6–4	(Egypt) Lamis Alhussein Abdel Aziz	(United Kingdom) Esther Adeshina (Germany) Anja Wildgruber	(United States) Michaela Gordon (United States) Julia Adams; Ekaterina Ivanova (Poland) Monika Stankiewicz
June 24	Monastir, Tunisia; Hard; W15; Singles and doubles draws	(Kyrgyzstan) Vladislava Andreevskaya; Anastasia Gasanova; 6–2, 6–4	(Australia) Ella Simmons (Indonesia) Janice Tjen	(United Kingdom) Esther Adeshina (Germany) Anja Wildgruber	(United States) Michaela Gordon (United States) Julia Adams; Ekaterina Ivanova (Poland) Monika Stankiewicz
June 24	Los Angeles, United States; Hard; W15; Singles and doubles draws	(India) Sahaja Yamalapalli; 6–4, 7–6^{(7–4)}	(United States) Amy Zhu	(United States) Rachel Gailis (United States) Victoria Flores	(United States) Kate Fakih (United States) Amelia Honer (Canada) Ana Grubor (United States) Jessica Failla
June 24	Los Angeles, United States; Hard; W15; Singles and doubles draws	(Ukraine) Anita Sahdiieva (Australia) Stefani Webb; 7–5, 4–6, [10–6]	(Australia) Lily Fairclough (Australia) Tenika McGiffin	(United States) Rachel Gailis (United States) Victoria Flores	(United States) Kate Fakih (United States) Amelia Honer (Canada) Ana Grubor (United States) Jessica Failla
