= 2024 Engie Open de Biarritz – Singles =

Singles
- 2024 Engie Open de Biarritz

Final
- Champion: (Japan) Sara Saito
- Runner-up: (France) Margaux Rouvroy
- Score: 5–7, 6–3, 6–3

Events
Singles	Doubles
← 2023 ·	Open de Biarritz	· 2025 →

The 2024 Engie Open de Biarritz – Singles was the singles event of the Open de Biarritz, a professional women's tennis tournament played on outdoor clay courts in Biarritz, France.

Fiona Ferro was the defending champion of the 2024 Engie Open de Biarritz but chose not to participate.

Sara Saito won the singles title, after defeating Margaux Rouvroy in the final, 5–7, 6–3, 6–3.

== Seeds ==
1. (Hungary) Panna Udvardy (second round)
2. (France) Chloé Paquet (first round)
3. (France) Léolia Jeanjean (second round)
4. (France) Elsa Jacquemot (quarterfinals)
5. (Ukraine) Kateryna Baindl (second round)
6. (Switzerland) Simona Waltert (first round)
7. Ekaterina Makarova (second round)
8. (France) Carole Monnet (first round)

== Draw ==
=== Key ===
- Q = Qualifier
- WC = Wild card
- LL = Lucky loser
- Alt = Alternate
- SE = Special exempt
- PR = Protected ranking
- ITF = ITF entry
- JE = Junior exempt
- w/o = Walkover
- r = Retired
- d = Defaulted
- SR = Special ranking

=== Finals ===
Semifinals
(Japan) Sara Saito	6	7
(Greece) Despina Papamichail	4	5
(France) Amandine Hesse	6	4	6^{4}
WC	(France) Margaux Rouvroy	1	6	7^{7}

Final
(Japan) Sara Saito	5	6	6
WC	(France) Margaux Rouvroy	7	3	3

=== Top half ===
First round
1	(Hungary) P Udvardy	6	6^{4}	6
Q	(Malta) F Curmi	3	7^{7}	2
Q	(France) A Ramé	4	4
(Romania) A Mitu	6	6
(Japan) S Saito	4	6	6
(France) K Mladenovic	6	3	0
(France) S Janicijevic	2	1
5	(Ukraine) K Baindl	6	6
3	(France) L Jeanjean	6	2
(Switzerland) J Teichmann	1	1^{r}
Q	(Andorra) V Jiménez Kasintseva	6	6
Q	(France) TS Rakotomanga Rajaonah	2	2
(Greece) D Papamichail	6	0
Q	(Canada) V Mboko	1	0^{r}
(Greece) S Sakellaridi	7	6
8	(France) C Monnet	5	2

Second round
1	(Hungary) P Udvardy	1	3
(Romania) A Mitu	6	6
(Japan) S Saito	6	6
5	(Ukraine) K Baindl	4	3
3	(France) L Jeanjean	2	3
Q	(Andorra) V Jiménez Kasintseva	6	6
(Greece) D Papamichail	6	6
(Greece) S Sakellaridi	4	0

Quarterfinals
(Romania) A Mitu	4	3
(Japan) S Saito	6	6
Q	(Andorra) V Jiménez Kasintseva	4	3
(Greece) D Papamichail	6	6

Semifinals
(Japan) S Saito	6	7
(Greece) D Papamichail	4	5

=== Bottom half ===
First round
6	(Switzerland) S Waltert	3	7	4
(France) A Hesse	6	5	6
(Croatia) P Marčinko	4	6	6
(Turkey) İ Öz	6	2	2
(Bulgaria) G Topalova	3	6	3
Q	(Italy) D Spiteri	6	3	6
Q	(Liechtenstein) K von Deichmann	4	0
4	(France) E Jacquemot	6	6
7	E Makarova	6	6
WC	(France) N Berecoechea	1	3
WC	(France) M Rouvroy	6	6
Q	(France) A Rezaï	3	3
WC	(France) A Albié	3	1
(China) X You	6	6
(Romania) I Bara	0	6	6
2	(France) C Paquet	6	3	2

Second round
(France) A Hesse	3	7^{7}	6
(Croatia) P Marčinko	6	6^{2}	1
Q	(Italy) D Spiteri	7^{10}	1	3
4	(France) E Jacquemot	6^{8}	6	6
7	E Makarova	3	3
WC	(France) M Rouvroy	6	6
(China) X You	2	6	6
(Romania) I Bara	6	4	4

Quarterfinals
(France) A Hesse	6	6
4	(France) E Jacquemot	3	2
WC	(France) M Rouvroy	6	6
(China) X You	0	4

Semifinals
(France) A Hesse	6	4	6^{4}
WC	(France) M Rouvroy	1	6	7^{7}
