= 2024 Engie Open de Biarritz – Doubles =

Doubles
- 2024 Engie Open de Biarritz

Final
- Champions: (Romania) Irina Bara (Romania) Andreea Mitu
- Runners-up: (France) Estelle Cascino (France) Carole Monnet
- Score: 6–3, 3–6, [10–7]

Events
Singles	Doubles
← 2023 ·	Open de Biarritz	· 2025 →

The 2024 Engie Open de Biarritz – Doubles was the doubles event of the Open de Biarritz, a professional women's tennis tournament played on outdoor clay courts.

Weronika Falkowska and Katarzyna Kawa were the defending champions for the 2024 Engie Open de Biarritz – Doubles but Falkowska chose to compete in Gdańsk instead, and Kawa chose not to participate.

Irina Bara and Andreea Mitu won the title, defeating Estelle Cascino and Carole Monnet in the final, 6–3, 3–6, [10–7].

== Seeds ==
1. Maria Kozyreva / (Kazakhstan) Zhibek Kulambayeva (quarterfinals)
2. (France) Estelle Cascino / (France) Carole Monnet (final)
3. (United States) Carmen Corley / (United States) Ivana Corley (quarterfinals)
4. (United States) Jessie Aney / (United States) Christina Rosca (semifinals)

== Draw ==
=== Key ===
- Q = Qualifier
- WC = Wild card
- LL = Lucky loser
- Alt = Alternate
- SE = Special exempt
- PR = Protected ranking
- ITF = ITF entry
- JE = Junior exempt
- w/o = Walkover
- r = Retired
- d = Defaulted
- SR = Special ranking

First round
1	M Kozyreva (Kazakhstan) Z Kulambayeva	6	6
(Japan) E Koike (Japan) S Saito	4	1
(Romania) I Bara (Romania) A Mitu	6	6
(Ukraine) M Kolb (Ukraine) N Kolb	1	2
4	(United States) J Aney (United States) C Rosca	6	6
(United Kingdom) A Collins (Colombia) MP Pérez	4	3
Alt	(United Kingdom) S Anane (Ukraine) M Kostiuk	4	0
(Greece) E Christofi; E Makarova	6	6
(France) A Albié (France) N Berecoechea	3	6	[5]
(France) É Dartron (France) TS Rakotomanga Rajaonah	6	2	[10]
(France) A Hesse (France) S Janicijevic	6	2	[10]
3	(United States) C Corley (United States) I Corley	2	6	[12]
(France) J Lim (France) M Rouvroy	1	1
(Malta) F Curmi (Greece) D Papamichail	6	6
WC	(France) L De Ezcurra (France) A Martial	2	1
2	(France) E Cascino (France) C Monnet	6	6

Quarterfinals
1	M Kozyreva (Kazakhstan) Z Kulambayeva	3	6	[7]
(Romania) I Bara (Romania) A Mitu	6	4	[10]
4	(United States) J Aney (United States) C Rosca	6	7
(Greece) E Christofi; E Makarova	4	5
(France) É Dartron (France) TS Rakotomanga Rajaonah	7	4	[10]
3	(United States) C Corley (United States) I Corley	5	6	[3]
(Malta) F Curmi (Greece) D Papamichail	4	3
2	(France) E Cascino (France) C Monnet	6	6

Semifinals
(Romania) I Bara (Romania) A Mitu	6	6
4	(United States) J Aney (United States) C Rosca	3	3
(France) É Dartron (France) TS Rakotomanga Rajaonah	6^{3}	5
2	(France) E Cascino (France) C Monnet	7^{7}	7

Final
(Romania) I Bara (Romania) A Mitu	6	3	[10]
2	(France) E Cascino (France) C Monnet	3	6	[7]
