= 2024 Engie Open de Biarritz =

Tennis tournament

- Date: 10–16 June 2024
- Edition: 21st
- Category: ITF Women's World Tennis Tour
- Prize money: $100,000
- Surface: Clay / Outdoor
- Location: Biarritz, France

Champions

Singles
- (Japan) Sara Saito

Doubles
- (Romania) Irina Bara / (Romania) Andreea Mitu
← 2023 ·	Open de Biarritz	· 2025 →

The 2024 Engie Open de Biarritz was the 21st edition of the Open de Biarritz, a professional women's tennis tournament played on outdoor clay courts. The tournament was part of the 2024 ITF Women's World Tennis Tour. It took place in Biarritz, France, between 10 and 16 June 2024. This year the tournament prize money was raised to $100,000.

== Champions ==
=== Singles ===
- (Japan) Sara Saito def. (France) Margaux Rouvroy, 5–7, 6–3, 6–3

=== Doubles ===
- (Romania) Irina Bara / (Romania) Andreea Mitu def. (France) Estelle Cascino / (France) Carole Monnet, 6–3, 3–6, [10–7]

== Singles main draw entrants ==
=== Seeds ===
Country	Player	Rank	Seed
HUN	Panna Udvardy	132	1
FRA	Chloé Paquet	136	2
FRA	Léolia Jeanjean	148	3
FRA	Elsa Jacquemot	149	4
UKR	Kateryna Baindl	167	5
SUI	Simona Waltert	171	6
	Ekaterina Makarova	172	7
FRA	Carole Monnet	190	8

- Rankings are as of 27 May 2024.

=== Other entrants ===
The following players received wildcards into the singles main draw:

- (France) Audrey Albié
- (France) Nahia Berecoechea
- (France) Margaux Rouvroy

The following players received entry from the qualifying draw:

- (Malta) Francesca Curmi
- (Andorra) Victoria Jiménez Kasintseva
- (Canada) Victoria Mboko
- (France) Tiantsoa Sarah Rakotomanga Rajaonah
- (France) Alice Ramé
- (France) Aravane Rezaï
- (Italy) Dalila Spiteri
- (Liechtenstein) Kathinka von Deichmann
