= 2018 Engie Open de Biarritz =

Women's tennis tournament

- Date: 10–16 September
- Edition: 16th
- Category: ITF Women's Circuit
- Prize money: $80,000
- Surface: Clay
- Location: Biarritz, France

Champions

Singles
- (Germany) Tamara Korpatsch

Doubles
- (Romania) Irina Bara / (Russia) Valentyna Ivakhnenko
← 2017 ·	Open de Biarritz	· 2019 →

The 2018 Open de Biarritz was the 16th edition of the Open de Biarritz, a professional tennis tournament played on outdoor clay courts. This edition of the tournament was part of the 2018 ITF Women's Circuit. It took place in Biarritz, France, on 10–16 September 2018.

== Singles main draw entrants ==
=== Seeds ===
Country	Player	Rank^{1}	Seed
GER	Carina Witthöft	101	1
UZB	Sabina Sharipova	123	2
BEL	Ysaline Bonaventure	124	3
UKR	Anhelina Kalinina	134	4
ROU	Irina Bara	139	5
GER	Laura Siegemund	146	6
SUI	Conny Perrin	148	7
RUS	Irina Khromacheva	149	8

- ^{1} Rankings as of 27 August 2018.

=== Other entrants ===
The following players received a wildcard into the singles main draw:

- (Switzerland) Timea Bacsinszky
- (France) Chloé Paquet
- (France) Jessika Ponchet
- (France) Harmony Tan

The following player received entry using a protected ranking:

- (Russia) Alexandra Panova

The following players received entry by special exempts:

- (Argentina) Paula Ormaechea
- (Belgium) Kimberley Zimmermann

The following players received entry from the qualifying draw:

- (France) Marine Partaud
- (Spain) Olga Sáez Larra
- (Bulgaria) Isabella Shinikova
- (Slovakia) Rebecca Šramková

== Champions ==
=== Singles ===
- (Germany) Tamara Korpatsch def. (Switzerland) Timea Bacsinszky, 6–2, 7–5

=== Doubles ===
- (Romania) Irina Bara / (Russia) Valentyna Ivakhnenko def. (Belgium) Ysaline Bonaventure / (Belgium) Hélène Scholsen, 6–4, 6–1
