= 2017 Engie Open de Biarritz – Singles =

Singles
- 2017 Engie Open de Biarritz

Final
- Champion: (Romania) Mihaela Buzărnescu
- Runner-up: (Switzerland) Patty Schnyder
- Score: 6–4, 6–3

Events
Singles	Doubles
← 2016 ·	Open de Biarritz	· 2018 →

The 2017 Engie Open de Biarritz – Singles was the singles event of the Open de Biarritz, which is a professional women's tennis tournament played on outdoor clay courts in Biarritz, France.

Rebecca Šramková was the defending champion, but chose not to participate.

Mihaela Buzărnescu won the title, defeating Patty Schnyder in the final, 6–4, 6–3.

== Seeds ==
1. (Belgium) Maryna Zanevska (first round; retired)
2. (Romania) Mihaela Buzărnescu (champion)
3. (Germany) Tamara Korpatsch (first round)
4. (Italy) Martina Trevisan (semifinals)
5. (Bulgaria) Viktoriya Tomova (second round)
6. (Turkey) Çağla Büyükakçay (quarterfinals)
7. (Romania) Alexandra Cadanțu (first round; retired)
8. (Switzerland) Jil Teichmann (semifinals)

== Draw ==
=== Key ===
- Q = Qualifier
- WC = Wild card
- LL = Lucky loser
- Alt = Alternate
- SE = Special exempt
- PR = Protected ranking
- ITF = ITF entry
- JE = Junior exempt
- w/o = Walkover
- r = Retired
- d = Defaulted
- SR = Special ranking

=== Finals ===
Semifinals
(Switzerland) Patty Schnyder	6	6
8	(Switzerland) Jil Teichmann	2	2
4	(Italy) Martina Trevisan	4	3
2	(Romania) Mihaela Buzărnescu	6	6

Final
(Switzerland) Patty Schnyder	4	3
2	(Romania) Mihaela Buzărnescu	6	6

=== Top half ===
First round
1	(Belgium) M Zanevska	6^{2}	0^{r}
Q	(United States) C Scholl	7^{7}	0
(Australia) I Wallace	6	4	6^{0}
(Switzerland) P Schnyder	3	6	7^{7}
(Ukraine) G Poznikhirenko	6	6
WC	(France) V Razzano	0	0
(Russia) V Kamenskaya	6	4
7	(Romania) A Cadanțu	0	0^{r}
3	(Germany) T Korpatsch	3	3
(Slovenia) P Hercog	6	6
(Germany) A Zaja	3	4
(Chile) D Seguel	6	6
(Spain) S Soler Espinosa	6	6
(France) C Paquet	1	4
(Netherlands) B Schoofs	3	1
8	(Switzerland) J Teichmann	6	6

Second round
Q	(United States) C Scholl	4	6^{9}
(Switzerland) P Schnyder	6	7^{11}
(Ukraine) G Poznikhirenko	3	3
(Russia) V Kamenskaya	6	6
(Slovenia) P Hercog	6	6
(Chile) D Seguel	4	2
(Spain) S Soler Espinosa	4	4
8	(Switzerland) J Teichmann	6	6

Quarterfinals
(Switzerland) P Schnyder	6	7
(Russia) V Kamenskaya	4	5
(Slovenia) P Hercog	4	7	4
8	(Switzerland) J Teichmann	6	5	6

Semifinals
(Switzerland) P Schnyder	6	6
8	(Switzerland) J Teichmann	2	2

=== Bottom half ===
First round
6	(Turkey) C Büyükakçay	6	6
(France) F Ferro	4	1
(Netherlands) C Burger	7^{8}	2	1
Q	(France) A Albié	6^{6}	6	6
(Russia) V Ivakhnenko	2	1
WC	(France) A Lim	6	6
(Switzerland) S Vögele	1	5
4	(Italy) M Trevisan	6	7
5	(Bulgaria) V Tomova	6^{4}	6	6
(Spain) O Sáez Larra	7^{7}	4	4
WC	(France) L Bencheikh	3	2
(Romania) I Bara	6	6
Q	(Spain) Y Cavallé Reimers	6	1	3
WC	(France) J Ponchet	2	6	6
Q	(France) M Noël	6	3	2
2	(Romania) M Buzărnescu	2	6	6

Second round
6	(Turkey) C Büyükakçay	6	6
Q	(France) A Albié	3	3
WC	(France) A Lim	3	5
4	(Italy) M Trevisan	6	7
5	(Bulgaria) V Tomova	2	5
(Romania) I Bara	6	7
WC	(France) J Ponchet	5	6	1
2	(Romania) M Buzărnescu	7	3	6

Quarterfinals
6	(Turkey) C Büyükakçay	6	6^{5}	5
4	(Italy) M Trevisan	4	7^{7}	7
(Romania) I Bara	4	0
2	(Romania) M Buzărnescu	6	6

Semifinals
4	(Italy) M Trevisan	4	3
2	(Romania) M Buzărnescu	6	6
