= 2012 Open GDF Suez de Biarritz =

- Date: July 9–15
- Edition: 10th
- Surface: Clay – Outdoor
- Location: Biarritz, France

Champions

Singles
- (Switzerland) Romina Oprandi

Doubles
- (France) Séverine Beltrame / (France) Laura Thorpe
← 2011 ·	Open GDF Suez de Biarritz	· 2013 →

The 2012 Open GDF Suez de Biarritz was a professional tennis tournament for women played on outdoor clay courts. It was the 10th edition of the tournament and was part of the 2012 ITF Women's Circuit. It took place in Biarritz, France between 9 and 15 July 2012. The singles championship was won by Romina Oprandi and the doubles championship by Séverine Beltrame and Laura Thorpe.

== WTA entrants ==
=== Seeds ===
Country	Player	Rank^{1}	Seed
FRA	Pauline Parmentier	70	1
NED	Arantxa Rus	72	2
FRA	Mathilde Johansson	81	3
LUX	Mandy Minella	83	4
SUI	Romina Oprandi	87	5
FRA	Virginie Razzano	91	6
CZE	Eva Birnerová	106	7
ITA	Alberta Brianti	113	8

- Rankings are as of June 25, 2012.

=== Other entrants ===
The following players received wildcards into the singles main draw:

- (France) Kristina Mladenovic

The following players received entry from the qualifying draw:

- (Norway) Ulrikke Eikeri
- (Bosnia and Herzegovina) Mervana Jugić-Salkić
- (Poland) Patrycja Sanduska
- (Georgia (country)) Sofia Shapatava

The following players received entry through a Lucky loser spot:

- (Russia) Angelina Gabueva
- (France) Amandine Hesse

== Champions ==
=== Singles ===
- (Switzerland) Romina Oprandi def. (Luxembourg) Mandy Minella, 7–5, 7–5

=== Doubles ===
- (France) Séverine Beltrame / (France) Laura Thorpe def. (Spain) Lara Arruabarrena Vecino / (Puerto Rico) Monica Puig, 6–2, 6–3
