= 2016 Engie Open de Biarritz – Singles =

Singles
- 2016 Engie Open de Biarritz

Final
- Champion: (Slovakia) Rebecca Šramková
- Runner-up: (Italy) Martina Trevisan
- Score: 6–3, 4–6, 6–1

Events
Singles	Doubles
← 2015 ·	Engie Open de Biarritz	· 2017 →

The 2016 Engie Open de Biarritz – Singles was the singles event of the Open de Biarritz, a professional women's tennis tournament played on outdoor clay courts in Biarritz, France.

Laura Siegemund was the defending champion, but chose not to participate.

Rebecca Šramková won the title, defeating Martina Trevisan in the final, 6–3, 4–6, 6–1.

== Seeds ==
1. (France) Pauline Parmentier (quarterfinals)
2. (Romania) Sorana Cîrstea (semifinals)
3. (Germany) Carina Witthöft (quarterfinals)
4. (Russia) Irina Khromacheva (quarterfinals)
5. (Spain) Sílvia Soler Espinosa (first round)
6. (Brazil) Teliana Pereira (first round)
7. (Netherlands) Cindy Burger (first round)
8. (Slovakia) Rebecca Šramková (champion)

== Main draw ==
=== Key ===
- Q = Qualifier
- WC = Wild card
- LL = Lucky loser
- Alt = Alternate
- SE = Special exempt
- PR = Protected ranking
- ITF = ITF entry
- JE = Junior exempt
- w/o = Walkover
- r = Retired
- d = Defaulted
- SR = Special ranking

=== Finals ===
Semifinals
Q	(Italy) Martina Trevisan	7^{7}	6
WC	(France) Chloé Paquet	6^{4}	3
8	(Slovakia) Rebecca Šramková	6	7
2	(Romania) Sorana Cîrstea	3	5

Final
Q	(Italy) Martina Trevisan	3	6	1
8	(Slovakia) Rebecca Šramková	6	4	6

=== Top half ===
First round
1	(France) P Parmentier	6	6
(France) M Georges	2	2
Q	(Italy) J Paolini	4	6	6
(France) F Ferro	6	4	0
PR	(France) C Feuerstein	4	2
(Spain) O Sáez Larra	6	6
Q	(Italy) M Trevisan	3	6	7^{7}
7	(Netherlands) C Burger	6	3	6^{3}
4	(Russia) I Khromacheva	6	1	6
WC	(France) H Tan	0	6	2
Q	(Russia) V Flink	6	6
(Czech Republic) T Smitková	3	3
WC	(France) C Paquet	6	6^{4}	6
WC	(France) J Ponchet	4	7^{7}	4
(Argentina) C Pella	5	6	6
5	(Spain) S Soler Espinosa	7	2	2

Second round
1	(France) P Parmentier	6	6
Q	(Italy) J Paolini	2	2
(Spain) O Sáez Larra	4	4
Q	(Italy) M Trevisan	6	6
4	(Russia) I Khromacheva	6	6
Q	(Russia) V Flink	2	4
WC	(France) C Paquet	0
(Argentina) C Pella	1^{r}

Quarterfinals
1	(France) P Parmentier	4	1
Q	(Italy) M Trevisan	6	6
4	(Russia) I Khromacheva	1	3
WC	(France) C Paquet	6	6

Semifinals
Q	(Italy) M Trevisan	7^{7}	6
WC	(France) C Paquet	6^{4}	3

=== Bottom half ===
First round
8	(Slovakia) R Šramková	6	6
(Spain) L Pous Tió	3	2
WC	(France) S Cakarevic	2	6	2
(Serbia) N Stojanović	6	4	6
(United Kingdom) A Carreras	7^{7}	6
(Russia) N Vikhlyantseva	6^{5}	2
(France) V Razzano	4	1
3	(Germany) C Witthöft	6	6
6	(Brazil) T Pereira	3	6	5
(Russia) V Kudermetova	6	2	7
(Ukraine) M Zanevska	7^{7}	6
(Germany) T Korpatsch	6^{2}	3
(Chile) D Seguel	6	6
(Russia) P Leykina	2	2
Q	(Brazil) B Haddad Maia	1	6	2
2	(Romania) S Cîrstea	6	2	6

Second round
8	(Slovakia) R Šramková	6	7^{7}
(Serbia) N Stojanović	4	6^{4}
(United Kingdom) A Carreras	2	5
3	(Germany) C Witthöft	6	7
(Russia) V Kudermetova	4	6	6
(Ukraine) M Zanevska	6	4	2
(Chile) D Seguel	1	1
2	(Romania) S Cîrstea	6	6

Quarterfinals
8	(Slovakia) R Šramková	6	6
3	(Germany) C Witthöft	2	3
(Russia) V Kudermetova	1	4
2	(Romania) S Cîrstea	6	6

Semifinals
8	(Slovakia) R Šramková	6	7
2	(Romania) S Cîrstea	3	5
