= 2017 Engie Open de Biarritz =

- Date: 11–17 September
- Edition: 15th
- Category: ITF Women's Circuit
- Prize money: $80,000
- Surface: Clay
- Location: Biarritz, France

Champions

Singles
- (Romania) Mihaela Buzărnescu

Doubles
- (Romania) Irina Bara / (Romania) Mihaela Buzărnescu
← 2016 ·	Open de Biarritz	· 2018 →

The 2017 Engie Open de Biarritz was a professional women's tennis tournament played on outdoor clay courts. It was the fifteenth edition of the tournament and was part of the 2017 ITF Women's Circuit. It took place in Biarritz, France, on 11–17 September 2017.

== Singles main draw entrants ==
=== Seeds ===
Country	Player	Rank^{1}	Seed
BEL	Maryna Zanevska	105	1
ROU	Mihaela Buzărnescu	133	2
GER	Tamara Korpatsch	138	3
ITA	Martina Trevisan	144	4
BUL	Viktoriya Tomova	155	5
TUR	Çağla Büyükakçay	156	6
ROU	Alexandra Cadanțu	164	7
SUI	Jil Teichmann	181	8

- ^{1} Rankings as of 28 August 2017.

=== Other entrants ===
The following players received a wildcard into the singles main draw:

- (France) Loudmilla Bencheikh
- (France) Alizé Lim
- (France) Jessika Ponchet
- (France) Virginie Razzano

The following players received entry from the qualifying draw:

- (France) Audrey Albié
- (Spain) Yvonne Cavallé Reimers
- (France) Mallaurie Noël
- (United States) Chiara Scholl

== Champions ==
=== Singles ===
- (Romania) Mihaela Buzărnescu def. (Switzerland) Patty Schnyder, 6–4, 6–3

=== Doubles ===
- (Romania) Irina Bara / (Romania) Mihaela Buzărnescu def. (Spain) Cristina Bucșa / (Australia) Isabelle Wallace, 6–3, 6–1
