= 2018 Engie Open de Biarritz – Singles =

Singles
- 2018 Engie Open de Biarritz

Final
- Champion: (Germany) Tamara Korpatsch
- Runner-up: (Switzerland) Timea Bacsinszky
- Score: 6–2, 7–5

Events
Singles	Doubles
- Open de Biarritz

The 2018 Engie Open de Biarritz – Singles was the singles event of the Open de Biarritz, a professional women's tennis tournament played on outdoor clay courts in the city of Biarritz, in France.

Mihaela Buzărnescu was the defending champion but chose not to participate.

Tamara Korpatsch won the title, defeating Timea Bacsinszky in the final, 6–2, 7–5.

== Seeds ==
1. (Germany) Carina Witthöft (second round)
2. (Uzbekistan) Sabina Sharipova (first round, retired)
3. (Belgium) Ysaline Bonaventure (quarterfinals)
4. (Ukraine) Anhelina Kalinina (quarterfinals)
5. (Romania) Irina Bara (second round)
6. (Germany) Laura Siegemund (first round)
7. (Switzerland) Conny Perrin (second round)
8. (Russia) Irina Khromacheva (first round)

== Draw ==
Key

- Q = Qualifier
- WC = Wild card
- LL = Lucky loser
- Alt = Alternate
- ITF = ITF entry
- PR = Protected ranking
- SR = Special ranking
- SE = Special exempt
- JE = Junior exempt
- JR = Junior Accelerator Programme entrant
- CO = College Accelerator Programme entrant
- NG = Next Gen Accelerator Program entrant
- w/o = Walkover
- r = Retired
- d = Defaulted

=== Finals ===
Semifinals
WC	(Switzerland) Timea Bacsinszky	7	6
SE	(Argentina) Paula Ormaechea	5	3
(Czech Republic) Tereza Smitková	4	5
(Germany) Tamara Korpatsch	6	7

Final
WC	(Switzerland) Timea Bacsinszky	2	5
(Germany) Tamara Korpatsch	6	7

=== Top half ===
First round
1	(Germany) C Witthöft	6	7^{7}
(Bulgaria) E Kostova	4	6^{2}
WC	(France) M Georges	3	3
Q	(Slovakia) R Šramková	6	6
WC	(Switzerland) T Bacsinszky	5	6	6
(Ukraine) K Zavatska	7	3	2
(Russia) V Ivakhnenko	4	4
5	(Romania) I Bara	6	6
3	(Belgium) Y Bonaventure	7^{7}	6
(France) J Ponchet	6^{2}	1
(Turkey) Ç Büyükakçay	6	6
(Slovakia) J Čepelová	4	3
(Paraguay) V Cepede Royg	6	4	4
SE	(Argentina) P Ormaechea	4	6	6
(Georgia (country)) E Gorgodze	6	6^{8}	6
8	(Russia) I Khromacheva	3	7^{10}	0

Second round
1	(Germany) C Witthöft	6^{5}	6^{2}
Q	(Slovakia) R Šramková	7^{7}	7^{7}
WC	(Switzerland) T Bacsinszky	6	7
5	(Romania) I Bara	2	5
3	(Belgium) Y Bonaventure	7	6^{3}	7^{8}
(Turkey) Ç Büyükakçay	5	7^{7}	6^{6}
SE	(Argentina) P Ormaechea	7	6
(Georgia (country)) E Gorgodze	5	4

Quarterfinals
Q	(Slovakia) R Šramková	2	2^{r}
WC	(Switzerland) T Bacsinszky	6	1
3	(Belgium) Y Bonaventure	4	4
SE	(Argentina) P Ormaechea	6	6

Semifinals
WC	(Switzerland) T Bacsinszky	7	6
SE	(Argentina) P Ormaechea	5	3

=== Bottom half ===
First round
7	(Switzerland) C Perrin	6	2	6
PR	(Russia) A Panova	3	6	2
Q	(France) M Partaud	6	3	2
(Czech Republic) T Smitková	1	6	6
(Spain) A Bolsova Zadoinov	4	6	6
(Liechtenstein) K von Deichmann	6	2	3
WC	(France) C Paquet	0	3
4	(Ukraine) A Kalinina	6	6
6	(Germany) L Siegemund	6	4	6^{0}
Q	(Bulgaria) I Shinikova	3	6	7^{7}
SE	(Belgium) K Zimmermann	6	6
(Italy) M Di Giuseppe	4	3
(Germany) T Korpatsch	7	7
WC	(France) H Tan	5	5
Q	(Spain) O Sáez Larra	6	3	4
2	(Uzbekistan) S Sharipova	2	6	2^{r}

Second round
7	(Switzerland) C Perrin	3	6	3
(Czech Republic) T Smitková	6	4	6
(Spain) A Bolsova Zadoinov	6	5	2
4	(Ukraine) A Kalinina	4	7	6
Q	(Bulgaria) I Shinikova	4	6	3
SE	(Belgium) K Zimmermann	6	2	6
(Germany) T Korpatsch	6	6
Q	(Spain) O Sáez Larra	1	2

Quarterfinals
(Czech Republic) T Smitková	7	6
4	(Ukraine) A Kalinina	5	3
SE	(Belgium) K Zimmermann	2	3
(Germany) T Korpatsch	6	6

Semifinals
(Czech Republic) T Smitková	4	5
(Germany) T Korpatsch	6	7
