= 2013 Open GDF Suez de Biarritz – Doubles =

Doubles
- 2013 Open GDF Suez de Biarritz

Final
- Champions: (Ukraine) Yuliya Beygelzimer (Ukraine) Olga Savchuk
- Runners-up: (Russia) Vera Dushevina (Croatia) Ana Vrljić
- Score: 2–6, 6–4, [10–8]

Events
Singles	Doubles
← 2012 ·	Open GDF Suez de Biarritz	· 2014 →

Séverine Beltrame and Laura Thorpe were the defending champions, having won the event in 2012. Beltrame chose not to defend her title; Thorpe partnered up with Stephanie Vogt but lost in the semifinals to fourth seeds Yuliya Beygelzimer and Olga Savchuk.

Beygelzimer and Savchuk won the title, defeating Vera Dushevina and Ana Vrljić in the final, 2–6, 6–4, [10–8].

== Seeds ==
1. (Luxembourg) Mandy Minella / (Russia) Alexandra Panova (first round)
2. (Russia) Vera Dushevina / (Croatia) Ana Vrljić (final)
3. (Bosnia and Herzegovina) Mervana Jugić-Salkić / (France) Irena Pavlovic (first round; retired)
4. (Ukraine) Yuliya Beygelzimer / (Ukraine) Olga Savchuk (champions)

== Draw ==
=== Key ===
- Q = Qualifier
- WC = Wild card
- LL = Lucky loser
- Alt = Alternate
- SE = Special exempt
- PR = Protected ranking
- ITF = ITF entry
- JE = Junior exempt
- w/o = Walkover
- r = Retired
- d = Defaulted
- SR = Special ranking

First round
1	(Luxembourg) M Minella (Russia) A Panova	7^{12}	6^{1}	[8]
(France) L Thorpe (Liechtenstein) S Vogt	6^{10}	7^{7}	[10]
WC	(France) I Ramialison (France) C Sibille	4	3
(Bulgaria) A Naydenova (Georgia (country)) S Shapatava	6	6
4	(Ukraine) Y Beygelzimer (Ukraine) O Savchuk	7	6
(Belgium) M Boev (France) A Hesse	5	2
(Romania) A Mitu (Slovakia) AK Schmiedlová	6	0	[7]
(Romania) L-I Andrei (Czech Republic) N Fraňková	4	6	[10]
WC	(France) C Maisonnave (France) L Maisonnave	3	6^{6}
(Venezuela) MA Cárdenas (Japan) K Onishi	6	7^{8}
(Russia) E Bychkova (Ukraine) N Kichenok	3
3	(Bosnia and Herzegovina) M Jugić-Salkić (France) I Pavlovic	0^{r}
(Italy) C Coppola (Germany) A Schäfer	6	6
WC	(France) E Morin Kougoucheff (France) J Ponchet	4	3
(Russia) M Kondratieva (United Kingdom) N Slater	4	6^{3}
2	(Russia) V Dushevina (Croatia) A Vrljić	6	7^{7}

Quarterfinals
(France) L Thorpe (Liechtenstein) S Vogt	6	1	[10]
(Bulgaria) A Naydenova (Georgia (country)) S Shapatava	4	6	[2]
4	(Ukraine) Y Beygelzimer (Ukraine) O Savchuk	7	6
(Romania) L-I Andrei (Czech Republic) N Fraňková	5	2
(Venezuela) MA Cárdenas (Japan) K Onishi	1	4
(Russia) E Bychkova (Ukraine) N Kichenok	6	6
(Italy) C Coppola (Germany) A Schäfer	4	4
2	(Russia) V Dushevina (Croatia) A Vrljić	6	6

Semifinals
(France) L Thorpe (Liechtenstein) S Vogt	6	1	[6]
4	(Ukraine) Y Beygelzimer (Ukraine) O Savchuk	1	6	[10]
(Russia) E Bychkova (Ukraine) N Kichenok	6	1	[7]
2	(Russia) V Dushevina (Croatia) A Vrljić	3	6	[10]

Final
4	(Ukraine) Y Beygelzimer (Ukraine) O Savchuk	2	6	[10]
2	(Russia) V Dushevina (Croatia) A Vrljić	6	4	[8]
