= 2011 Open GDF Suez de Biarritz =

- Date: July 4–10
- Edition: 9th
- Location: Biarritz, France

Champions

Singles
- (France) Pauline Parmentier

Doubles
- (Russia) Alexandra Panova / (Poland) Urszula Radwańska
← 2010 ·	Open GDF Suez de Biarritz	· 2012 →

The 2011 Open GDF Suez de Biarritz was a professional women's tennis tournament played on outdoor clay courts in Biarritz, France from 4 to 10 July. It was part of the 2011 ITF Women's Circuit. The singles championship was won by Pauline Parmentier and the doubles championship was won by Alexandra Panova and Urszula Radwańska.

== WTA entrants ==
=== Seeds ===
Nationality	Player	Ranking*	Seeding
FRA	Pauline Parmentier	74	1
TPE	Chan Yung-jan	94	2
AUT	Patricia Mayr-Achleitner	113	3
ESP	Carla Suárez Navarro	119	4
ITA	Maria Elena Camerin	120	5
ROU	Edina Gallovits-Hall	125	6
CZE	Renata Voráčová	128	7
FRA	Iryna Brémond	129	8

- Rankings are as of June 20, 2011.

=== Other entrants ===
The following players received wildcards into the singles main draw:

- (Italy) Maria Elena Camerin
- (France) Jessica Ginier
- (France) Kristina Mladenovic
- (France) Nathalie Piquion

The following players received entry from the qualifying draw:

- (Uzbekistan) Vlada Ekshibarova
- (Spain) Inés Ferrer-Suárez
- (Portugal) Maria João Koehler
- (Brazil) Roxane Vaisemberg

== Champions ==
=== Singles ===
(France) Pauline Parmentier def. (Austria) Patricia Mayr-Achleitner, 1–6, 6–4, 6–4

=== Doubles ===
(Russia) Alexandra Panova / (Poland) Urszula Radwańska def. (Japan) Erika Sema / (Brazil) Roxane Vaisemberg, 6–2, 6–1
