= 2011 Open GDF Suez de Biarritz – Doubles =

Doubles
- 2011 Open GDF Suez de Biarritz

Final
- Champion: (Russia) Alexandra Panova (Poland) Urszula Radwańska
- Runner-up: (Japan) Erika Sema (Brazil) Roxane Vaisemberg
- Score: 6–2, 6–1

Events
Singles	Doubles
← 2010 ·	Open GDF Suez de Biarritz	· 2012 →

The 2011 Open GDF Suez de Biarritz – Doubles was the doubles event of the Open GDF Suez de Biarritz, a professional women's tennis tournament played on outdoor clay courts in the city of Biarritz, in France.

The defending champions Sharon Fichman and Julia Görges both chose not to participate.

Alexandra Panova and Urszula Radwańska won the tournament defeating Erika Sema and Roxane Vaisemberg in the final 6–2, 6–1.

== Seeds ==
1. (Chinese Taipei) Chan Hao-ching / (Chinese Taipei) Chan Yung-jan (quarterfinals)
2. (Italy) Maria Elena Camerin / (Turkey) İpek Şenoğlu (semifinals)
3. (Ukraine) Yulia Beygelzimer / (Romania) Edina Gallovits-Hall (semifinals)
4. (France) Stéphanie Foretz Gacon / (Germany) Kathrin Wörle (quarterfinals)

== Draw ==
=== Key ===
- Q = Qualifier
- WC = Wild card
- LL = Lucky loser
- Alt = Alternate
- SE = Special exempt
- PR = Protected ranking
- ITF = ITF entry
- JE = Junior exempt
- w/o = Walkover
- r = Retired
- d = Defaulted
- SR = Special ranking

=== Draw ===
First round
(Russia) A Panova (Poland) U Radwańska	6	4	[10]
(Georgia (country)) M Chakhnashvili (France) L Thorpe	1	6	[8]
3	(Ukraine) Y Beygelzimer (Romania) E Gallovits-Hall	6	1	[12]
(Poland) M Linette (France) K Mladenovic	2	6	[10]
(Russia) R Kulikova (Russia) O Panova	6	4	[7]
(Bulgaria) E Kostova (Luxembourg) M Minella	3	6	[10]
(France) I Brémond (France) C Feuerstein	1	4
(Japan) E Sema (Brazil) R Vaisemberg	6	6
WC	(France) C Maisonnave (France) A Tisset	2	1
4	(France) S Foretz Gacon (Germany) K Wörle	6	6
(Spain) L Costas-Moreira (Spain) I Ferrer-Suárez	7	6
(Uzbekistan) V Ekshibarova (France) N Piquion	5	4
(Belarus) L Marozava (Belarus) P Pekhova	4	3
2	(Italy) ME Camerin (Turkey) İ Şenoğlu	6	6

Quarterfinals
1	(Chinese Taipei) H-c Chan (Chinese Taipei) Y-j Chan	3	2
(Russia) A Panova (Poland) U Radwańska	6	6
3	(Ukraine) Y Beygelzimer (Romania) E Gallovits-Hall	6	6
(Bulgaria) E Kostova (Luxembourg) M Minella	1	2
(Japan) E Sema (Brazil) R Vaisemberg	6	7
4	(France) S Foretz Gacon (Germany) K Wörle	3	6^{8}
(Spain) L Costas-Moreira (Spain) I Ferrer-Suárez	6	2	[7]
2	(Italy) ME Camerin (Turkey) İ Şenoğlu	2	6	[10]

Semifinals
(Russia) A Panova (Poland) U Radwańska	6	6
3	(Ukraine) Y Beygelzimer (Romania) E Gallovits-Hall	1	3
(Japan) E Sema (Brazil) R Vaisemberg	6	6
2	(Italy) ME Camerin (Turkey) İ Şenoğlu	2	1

Final
(Russia) A Panova (Poland) U Radwańska	6	6
(Japan) E Sema (Brazil) R Vaisemberg	2	1
