= 2011 Open GDF Suez de Biarritz – Singles =

Singles
- 2011 Open GDF Suez de Biarritz

Final
- Champions: (France) Pauline Parmentier
- Runners-up: (Austria) Patricia Mayr-Achleitner
- Score: 1–6, 6–4, 6–4

Events
Singles	Doubles
← 2010 ·	Open GDF Suez de Biarritz	· 2012 →

The 2011 Open GDF Suez de Biarritz – Singles was the singles event of the Open GDF Suez de Biarritz, a professional women's tennis tournament played on outdoor clay courts in Biarritz, France.

Julia Görges, the defending champion, chose not to participate.

Pauline Parmentier won the singles final, defeating Patricia Mayr-Achleitner 1–6, 6–4, 6–4.

== Seeds ==
1. (France) Pauline Parmentier (champion)
2. (Chinese Taipei) Chan Yung-jan (first round)
3. (Austria) Patricia Mayr-Achleitner (final)
4. (Spain) Carla Suárez Navarro (semifinals)
5. (Italy) Maria Elena Camerin (second round)
6. (Romania) Edina Gallovits-Hall (quarterfinals)
7. (Czech Republic) Renata Voráčová (first round)
8. (France) Iryna Brémond (quarterfinals)

== Draw ==
=== Key ===
- Q = Qualifier
- WC = Wild card
- LL = Lucky loser
- Alt = Alternate
- SE = Special exempt
- PR = Protected ranking
- ITF = ITF entry
- JE = Junior exempt
- w/o = Walkover
- r = Retired
- d = Defaulted
- SR = Special ranking

=== Finals ===
Semifinals
1	(France) Pauline Parmentier	6	3	6
4	(Spain) Carla Suárez Navarro	1	6	3
3	(Austria) Patricia Mayr-Achleitner	1	6	6
(Luxembourg) Mandy Minella	6	0	1

Final
1	(France) Pauline Parmentier	1	6	6
3	(Austria) Patricia Mayr-Achleitner	6	4	4

=== Top half ===
First round
1	(France) P Parmentier	6	6
(China) J Lu	3	4
(Poland) U Radwańska	3	4
(Russia) R Kulikova	6	6
Q	(Uzbekistan) V Ekshibarova	2	7	6
(Poland) M Linette	6	6^{6}	1
(Russia) A Panova	7	2	3
8	(France) I Brémond	5	6	6
4	(Spain) C Suárez Navarro	6	6
Q	(Portugal) MJ Koehler	3	4
(France) C Feuerstein	2	5
(Ukraine) Y Beygelzimer	6	7
(France) L Thorpe	6	1	1
(France) S Foretz Gacon	4	6	6
(Georgia (country)) M Chakhnashvili	6^{1}	7	1
5/WC	(Italy) ME Camerin	7	5	6

Second round
1	(France) P Parmentier	7	6
(Russia) R Kulikova	6^{4}	3
Q	(Uzbekistan) V Ekshibarova	5	2
8	(France) I Brémond	7	6
4	(Spain) C Suárez Navarro	1	6	6
(Ukraine) Y Beygelzimer	6	1	1
(France) S Foretz Gacon	7	6
5/WC	(Italy) ME Camerin	6^{7}	1

Quarterfinals
1	(France) P Parmentier	6	2	6
8	(France) I Brémond	3	6	1
4	(Spain) C Suárez Navarro	3	7	6
(France) S Foretz Gacon	6	5	2

Semifinals
1	(France) P Parmentier	6	3	6
4	(Spain) C Suárez Navarro	1	6	3

=== Bottom half ===
First round
6	(Romania) E Gallovits-Hall	6	7
WC	(France) N Piquion	0	5
(Bulgaria) E Kostova	1	6	6
(Italy) A Floris	6	1	2
(Germany) K Wörle	2	6	2
Q	(Spain) I Ferrer-Suárez	6	3	6
Q	(Brazil) R Vaisemberg	7	3	3
3	(Austria) P Mayr-Achleitner	5	6	6
7	(Czech Republic) R Voráčová	6	4	6^{1}
WC	(France) K Mladenovic	0	6	7
(Japan) E Sema	4	3
(Spain) L Costas-Moreira	6	6
(Luxembourg) M Minella	6	6
WC	(France) J Ginier	4	1
(Spain) S Soler Espinosa	7	7
2	(Chinese Taipei) Y-j Chan	5	5

Second round
6	(Romania) E Gallovits-Hall	6	5	6
(Bulgaria) E Kostova	1	7	0
Q	(Spain) I Ferrer-Suárez	2	1
3	(Austria) P Mayr-Achleitner	6	6
WC	(France) K Mladenovic	3	6^{1}
(Spain) L Costas-Moreira	6	7
(Luxembourg) M Minella	6	4	7
(Spain) S Soler Espinosa	2	6	5

Quarterfinals
6	(Romania) E Gallovits-Hall	1	4
3	(Austria) P Mayr-Achleitner	6	6
(Spain) L Costas-Moreira	3	4
(Luxembourg) M Minella	6	6

Semifinals
3	(Austria) P Mayr-Achleitner	1	6	6
(Luxembourg) M Minella	6	0	1
