= 2016 Engie Open de Biarritz =

- Date: 12–18 September
- Edition: 14th
- Category: ITF Women's Circuit
- Prize money: $100,000
- Surface: Clay
- Location: Biarritz, France

Champions

Singles
- (Slovakia) Rebecca Šramková

Doubles
- (Russia) Irina Khromacheva / (Ukraine) Maryna Zanevska
← 2015 ·	Engie Open de Biarritz	· 2017 →

The 2016 Engie Open de Biarritz Pays Basque was a professional women's tennis tournament played on outdoor clay courts. It was the 14th edition of the tournament and part of the 2016 ITF Women's Circuit, offering a total of $100,000 in prize money. It took place in Biarritz, France, on 12–18 September 2016.

== Singles main draw entrants ==
=== Seeds ===
Country	Player	Rank^{1}	Seed
FRA	Pauline Parmentier	63	1
ROU	Sorana Cîrstea	86	2
GER	Carina Witthöft	102	3
RUS	Irina Khromacheva	118	4
ESP	Sílvia Soler Espinosa	129	5
BRA	Teliana Pereira	136	6
NED	Cindy Burger	147	7
SVK	Rebecca Šramková	157	8

- ^{1} Rankings as of 29 August 2016.

=== Other entrants ===
The following player received a wildcard into the singles main draw:

- (France) Sara Cakarevic
- (France) Chloé Paquet
- (France) Jessika Ponchet
- (France) Harmony Tan

The following players received entry from the qualifying draw:

- (Russia) Varvara Flink
- (Brazil) Beatriz Haddad Maia
- (Italy) Jasmine Paolini
- (Italy) Martina Trevisan

The following player received entry by a protected ranking:

- (France) Claire Feuerstein

== Champions ==
=== Singles ===
- (Slovakia) Rebecca Šramková def. (Italy) Martina Trevisan, 6–3, 4–6, 6–1

=== Doubles ===
- (Russia) Irina Khromacheva / (Ukraine) Maryna Zanevska def. (Sweden) Cornelia Lister / (Serbia) Nina Stojanović, 4–6, 7–5, [10–8]
