= 2013 Open GDF Suez de Biarritz – Singles =

Singles
- 2013 Open GDF Suez de Biarritz

Final
- Champion: (Liechtenstein) Stephanie Vogt
- Runner-up: (Slovakia) Anna Karolína Schmiedlová
- Score: 1–6, 6–3, 6–2

Events
Singles	Doubles
← 2012 ·	Open GDF Suez de Biarritz	· 2014 →

The 2013 Engie Open de Biarritz – Singles was the singles event of the Open de Biarritz, a professional women's tennis tournament played on outdoor clay courts in Biarritz, in France.

Romina Oprandi was the defending champion, having won the event in 2012, but chose not to defend her title.

Stephanie Vogt won the title, defeating Anna Karolína Schmiedlová in the final, 1–6, 6–3, 6–2.

== Seeds ==
1. (Luxembourg) Mandy Minella (first round)
2. (France) Pauline Parmentier (quarterfinals)
3. (Slovakia) Anna Karolína Schmiedlová (final)
4. (Russia) Alexandra Panova (second round)
5. (Russia) Ekaterina Bychkova (second round)
6. (France) Claire Feuerstein (second round)
7. (France) Virginie Razzano (second round)
8. (Russia) Vera Dushevina (first round; retired)

== Main draw ==
=== Key ===
- Q = Qualifier
- WC = Wild card
- LL = Lucky loser
- Alt = Alternate
- SE = Special exempt
- PR = Protected ranking
- ITF = ITF entry
- JE = Junior exempt
- w/o = Walkover
- r = Retired
- d = Defaulted
- SR = Special ranking

=== Finals ===
Semifinals
WC	(France) Laura Thorpe	4	2
3	(Slovakia) Anna Karolína Schmiedlová	6	6
(France) Alizé Lim	4	7	2
(Liechtenstein) Stephanie Vogt	6	5	6

Final
3	(Slovakia) Anna Karolína Schmiedlová	6	3	2
(Liechtenstein) Stephanie Vogt	1	6	6

=== Top half ===
First round
1	(Luxembourg) M Minella	6	2	3
WC	(France) I Ramialison	4	6	6
(Georgia (country)) S Shapatava	2	1
WC	(France) L Thorpe	6	6
Q	(Argentina) V Furlanetto	2	6	4
(Germany) A Schäfer	6	1	6
(Germany) C Witthöft	4	6	3
7	(France) V Razzano	6	2	6
3	(Slovakia) AK Schmiedlová	6	6
(Romania) L-I Andrei	2	0
Q	(Ukraine) S Kovalets	6	6
Q	(Belgium) M Boev	1	1
(Ukraine) O Savchuk	7	6
(Romania) A Mitu	5	4
(France) I Pavlovic	2	0
5	(Russia) E Bychkova	6	6

Second round
WC	(France) I Ramialison	3	1
WC	(France) L Thorpe	6	6
(Germany) A Schäfer	6	6
7	(France) V Razzano	3	4
3	(Slovakia) AK Schmiedlová	7	6
Q	(Ukraine) S Kovalets	5	2
(Ukraine) O Savchuk	0	7^{7}	7^{7}
5	(Russia) E Bychkova	6	6^{3}	6^{3}

Quarterfinals
WC	(France) L Thorpe	6	6
(Germany) A Schäfer	1	4
3	(Slovakia) AK Schmiedlová	6	6
(Ukraine) O Savchuk	2	3

Semifinals
WC	(France) L Thorpe	4	2
3	(Slovakia) AK Schmiedlová	6	6

=== Bottom half ===
First round
6	(France) C Feuerstein	6	4	6
(Bosnia and Herzegovina) M Jugić-Salkić	1	6	2
(France) A Lim	6	6
(Croatia) A Vrljić	2	3
(Ukraine) N Kichenok	6	6
WC	(France) E Cascino	4	2
Q	(Russia) V Flink	6	3	4
4	(Russia) A Panova	2	6	6
8	(Russia) V Dushevina	5	2^{r}
WC	(France) C Sibille	7	3
(Bulgaria) A Naydenova	3	3
(Liechtenstein) S Vogt	6	6
(Czech Republic) P Cetkovská	6	1	0^{r}
(Ukraine) Y Beygelzimer	2	6	1
(France) A Hesse	3	4
2	(France) P Parmentier	6	6

Second round
6	(France) C Feuerstein	6	2	2
(France) A Lim	4	6	6
(Ukraine) N Kichenok	6	6
4	(Russia) A Panova	4	4
WC	(France) C Sibille	4	6	5
(Liechtenstein) S Vogt	6	4	7
(Ukraine) Y Beygelzimer	4	6^{3}
2	(France) P Parmentier	6	7^{7}

Quarterfinals
(France) A Lim	6	6
(Ukraine) N Kichenok	4	2
(Liechtenstein) S Vogt	6	6
2	(France) P Parmentier	0	4

Semifinals
(France) A Lim	4	7	2
(Liechtenstein) S Vogt	6	5	6
