= 2016 Engie Open de Biarritz – Doubles =

Doubles
- 2016 Engie Open de Biarritz

Final
- Champions: (Russia) Irina Khromacheva (Ukraine) Maryna Zanevska
- Runners-up: (Sweden) Cornelia Lister (Serbia) Nina Stojanović
- Score: 4–6, 7–5, [10–8]

Events
Singles	Doubles
← 2015 ·	Engie Open de Biarritz	· 2017 →

The 2016 Engie Open de Biarritz – Doubles was the doubles event of the Open de Biarritz, a professional women's tennis tournament played on outdoor clay courts.

Başak Eraydın and Lidziya Marozava were the defending champions, but chose not to participate.

Irina Khromacheva and Maryna Zanevska won the title, defeating Cornelia Lister and Nina Stojanović in the final, 4–6, 7–5, [10–8].

== Seeds ==
1. (Spain) Laura Pous Tió / (India) Prarthana Thombare (first round)
2. (Argentina) Catalina Pella / (Chile) Daniela Seguel (quarterfinals, withdrew)
3. (Russia) Irina Khromacheva / (Ukraine) Maryna Zanevska (champions)
4. (Netherlands) Cindy Burger / (Spain) Sílvia Soler Espinosa (first round)

== Draw ==
=== Key ===
- Q = Qualifier
- WC = Wild card
- LL = Lucky loser
- Alt = Alternate
- SE = Special exempt
- PR = Protected ranking
- ITF = ITF entry
- JE = Junior exempt
- w/o = Walkover
- r = Retired
- d = Defaulted
- SR = Special ranking

First round
1	(Spain) L Pous Tió (India) P Thombare	3	6	[8]
(Russia) P Leykina (Latvia) D Marcinkēviča	6	2	[10]
(France) F Ferro (France) M Yerolymos	6	6^{2}	[4]
(Brazil) B Haddad Maia (Slovakia) R Šramková	4	7^{7}	[10]
4	(Netherlands) C Burger (Spain) S Soler Espinosa	4	2
(Sweden) C Lister (Serbia) N Stojanović	6	6
(Spain) O Parres Azcoitia (Italy) C Rosatello	7	4	[2]
WC	(France) M Georges (France) J Suvrijn	5	6	[10]
WC	(France) J Ponchet (France) H Tan	5	6	[4]
WC	(France) A Albié (France) L Tholey	7	4	[10]
(France) C Paquet (Russia) N Vikhlyantseva	7^{7}	2	[6]
3	(Russia) I Khromacheva (Ukraine) M Zanevska	6^{5}	6	[10]
(United Kingdom) A Carreras (Italy) A Savoretti	3	7^{7}	[9]
(Belgium) E Boeykens (Germany) N Geuer	6	6^{5}	[11]
(France) P Parmentier (Germany) C Witthöft	5	0
2	(Argentina) C Pella (Chile) D Seguel	7	6

Quarterfinals
(Russia) P Leykina (Latvia) D Marcinkēviča	w/o
(Brazil) B Haddad Maia (Slovakia) R Šramková
(Sweden) C Lister (Serbia) N Stojanović	6	2	[10]
WC	(France) M Georges (France) J Suvrijn	4	6	[6]
WC	(France) A Albié (France) L Tholey	2	4
3	(Russia) I Khromacheva (Ukraine) M Zanevska	6	6
(Belgium) E Boeykens (Germany) N Geuer	w/o
2	(Argentina) C Pella (Chile) D Seguel

Semifinals
(Russia) P Leykina (Latvia) D Marcinkēviča	3	5
(Sweden) C Lister (Serbia) N Stojanović	6	7
3	(Russia) I Khromacheva (Ukraine) M Zanevska	6	6
(Belgium) E Boeykens (Germany) N Geuer	3	2

Final
(Sweden) C Lister (Serbia) N Stojanović	6	5	[8]
3	(Russia) I Khromacheva (Ukraine) M Zanevska	4	7	[10]
