= 2018 Engie Open de Biarritz – Doubles =

Doubles
- 2018 Engie Open de Biarritz

Final
- Champions: (Romania) Irina Bara (Russia) Valentyna Ivakhnenko
- Runners-up: (Belgium) Ysaline Bonaventure (Belgium) Hélène Scholsen
- Score: 6–4, 6–1

Events
Singles	Doubles
← 2017 ·	Open de Biarritz	· 2019 →

The 2018 Engie Open de Biarritz – Doubles was the doubles event of the Open de Biarritz, a professional women's tennis tournament played on outdoor clay courts.

Irina Bara and Mihaela Buzărnescu were the defending champions, but Buzărnescu chose not to participate.

Bara partnered with Valentyna Ivakhnenko and successfully defended her title, defeating Ysaline Bonaventure and Hélène Scholsen in the final in straight sets, 6–4, 6–1.

== Seeds ==
1. (Russia) Irina Khromacheva / (Brazil) Laura Pigossi (first round)
2. (Belgium) An-Sophie Mestach / (Russia) Alexandra Panova (first round)
3. (Belgium) Ysaline Bonaventure / (Belgium) Hélène Scholsen (final)
4. (Italy) Giorgia Marchetti / (Italy) Camilla Rosatello (first round)

== Draw ==
=== Key ===
- Q = Qualifier
- WC = Wild card
- LL = Lucky loser
- Alt = Alternate
- SE = Special exempt
- PR = Protected ranking
- ITF = ITF entry
- JE = Junior exempt
- w/o = Walkover
- r = Retired
- d = Defaulted
- SR = Special ranking

=== Draw ===
First round
1	(Russia) I Khromacheva (Brazil) L Pigossi	5	1
(Uzbekistan) A Amanmuradova (Georgia (country)) E Gorgodze	7	6
(Argentina) P Ormaechea (Belarus) S Pirazhenka	6	2	[8]
(Romania) I Bara (Russia) V Ivakhnenko	1	6	[10]
4	(Italy) G Marchetti (Italy) C Rosatello	4	0
WC	(France) M Georges (France) L Thorpe	6	6
WC	(France) A Albié (France) H Tan	2	6^{4}
(Spain) E Guerrero Álvarez (Spain) G Maristany	6	7^{7}
(Spain) C Bucșa (Colombia) MF Herazo	6	6
(Russia) K Bekker (Bulgaria) I Shinikova	0	0
WC	(France) J Bousseau (France) K Marthiens	2	0
3	(Belgium) Y Bonaventure (Belgium) H Scholsen	6	6
(France) J Ponchet (Belgium) K Zimmermann	6	7^{7}
(Switzerland) C Perrin (France) S Reix	4	6^{5}
(Czech Republic) T Smitková (India) P Thombare	6	2	[10]
2	(Belgium) A-S Mestach (Russia) A Panova	1	6	[8]

Quarterfinals
(Uzbekistan) A Amanmuradova (Georgia (country)) E Gorgodze	6	3	[3]
(Romania) I Bara (Russia) V Ivakhnenko	2	6	[10]
WC	(France) M Georges (France) L Thorpe	6	5	[8]
(Spain) E Guerrero Álvarez (Spain) G Maristany	2	7	[10]
(Spain) C Bucșa (Colombia) MF Herazo	1	5
3	(Belgium) Y Bonaventure (Belgium) H Scholsen	6	7
(France) J Ponchet (Belgium) K Zimmermann	7^{7}	6
(Czech Republic) T Smitková (India) P Thombare	6^{4}	2

Semifinals
(Romania) I Bara (Russia) V Ivakhnenko	6	6
(Spain) E Guerrero Álvarez (Spain) G Maristany	1	1
3	(Belgium) Y Bonaventure (Belgium) H Scholsen	6	6
(France) J Ponchet (Belgium) K Zimmermann	2	3

Final
(Romania) I Bara (Russia) V Ivakhnenko	6	6
3	(Belgium) Y Bonaventure (Belgium) H Scholsen	4	1
