= 2013 Open GDF Suez de Biarritz =

Women's Circuit tennis tournament

- Date: 8–14 July
- Edition: 11th
- Draw: 32S / 16D
- Prize money: $100,000
- Surface: Clay
- Location: Biarritz, France

Champions

Singles
- (Liechtenstein) Stephanie Vogt

Doubles
- (Ukraine) Yuliya Beygelzimer / (Ukraine) Olga Savchuk
- Open GDF Suez de Biarritz

The 2013 Open GDF Suez de Biarritz was a professional tennis tournament played on outdoor clay courts in the city of Biarritz, France, on 8–14 July. It was the eleventh edition of the tournament which was part of the 2013 ITF Women's Circuit, offering a total of $100,000 in prize money. The singles championship was won by Stephanie Vogt and the doubles championship was won by Yuliya Beygelzimer and Olga Savchuk.

== WTA entrants ==
=== Seeds ===
Country	Player	Rank^{1}	Seed
LUX	Mandy Minella	92	1
FRA	Pauline Parmentier	110	2
SVK	Anna Karolína Schmiedlová	119	3
RUS	Alexandra Panova	150	4
RUS	Ekaterina Bychkova	151	5
FRA	Claire Feuerstein	155	6
FRA	Virginie Razzano	158	7
RUS	Vera Dushevina	163	8

- ^{1} Rankings as of 24 June 2013

=== Other entrants ===
The following players received wildcards into the singles main draw:

- (France) Estelle Cascino
- (France) Irina Ramialison
- (France) Constance Sibille
- (France) Laura Thorpe

The following players received entry from the qualifying draw:

- (Belgium) Michaela Boev
- (Russia) Varvara Flink
- (Argentina) Vanesa Furlanetto
- (Ukraine) Sofiya Kovalets

== Champions ==
=== Women's singles ===
- (Liechtenstein) Stephanie Vogt def. (Slovakia) Anna Karolína Schmiedlová 1–6, 6–3, 6–2

=== Women's doubles ===
- (Ukraine) Yuliya Beygelzimer / (Ukraine) Olga Savchuk def. (Russia) Vera Dushevina / (Croatia) Ana Vrljić 2–6, 6–4, [10–8]
