= 2017 Engie Open de Biarritz – Doubles =

Doubles
- 2017 Engie Open de Biarritz

Final
- Champion: (Romania) Irina Bara (Romania) Mihaela Buzărnescu
- Runner-up: (Spain) Cristina Bucșa (Australia) Isabelle Wallace
- Score: 6–3, 6–1

Events
Singles	Doubles
← 2016 ·	Open de Biarritz	· 2018 →

The 2017 Engie Open de Biarritz – Doubles was the doubles event of the Open de Biarritz, a professional women's tennis tournament held in Biarritz, France, on outdoor clay courts.

Irina Khromacheva and Maryna Zanevska were the defending champions, but Khromacheva chose not to participate. Zanevska partnered Alizé Lim, but they lost in the first round to Audrey Albié and Marine Partaud.

Irina Bara and Mihaela Buzărnescu won the title after defeating Cristina Bucșa and Isabelle Wallace 6–3, 6–1 in the final.

== Seeds ==
1. (Romania) Alexandra Cadanțu / (Sweden) Cornelia Lister (first round)
2. (Romania) Irina Bara / (Romania) Mihaela Buzărnescu (champions)
3. (Brazil) Laura Pigossi / (Spain) Sílvia Soler Espinosa (semifinals)
4. (Brazil) Gabriela Cé / (Chile) Daniela Seguel (first round)

== Draw ==
=== Key ===
- Q = Qualifier
- WC = Wild card
- LL = Lucky loser
- Alt = Alternate
- SE = Special exempt
- PR = Protected ranking
- ITF = ITF entry
- JE = Junior exempt
- w/o = Walkover
- r = Retired
- d = Defaulted
- SR = Special ranking

First round
1	(Romania) A Cadanțu (Sweden) C Lister	2	6^{3}
(Russia) V Ivakhnenko (Ukraine) A Vasylyeva	6	7^{7}
WC	(Germany) T Korpatsch (France) J Ponchet	6	6
WC	(France) I Ramialison (France) L Tholey	4	4
4	(Brazil) G Cé (Chile) D Seguel	0	3
(Spain) C Bucșa (Australia) I Wallace	6	6
(France) F Ferro (France) C Paquet	6	4	[4]
(Spain) I Burillo Escorihuela (Spain) Y Cavallé Reimers	4	6	[10]
(Ukraine) G Poznikhirenko (France) J Suvrijn	3	3
(Greece) E Kordolaimi (Australia) S Mendez	6	6
(France) M Armitano (France) E Lechemia	3	6	[6]
3	(Brazil) L Pigossi (Spain) S Soler Espinosa	6	3	[10]
(France) A Lim (Belgium) M Zanevska	4	6	[9]
WC	(France) A Albié (France) M Partaud	6	2	[11]
(United States) C Scholl (Netherlands) B Schoofs	4	2
2	(Romania) I Bara (Romania) M Buzărnescu	6	6

Quarterfinals
(Russia) V Ivakhnenko (Ukraine) A Vasylyeva	7^{7}	2	[10]
WC	(Germany) T Korpatsch (France) J Ponchet	6^{0}	6	[6]
(Spain) C Bucșa (Australia) I Wallace	6	6
(Spain) I Burillo Escorihuela (Spain) Y Cavallé Reimers	2	2
(Greece) E Kordolaimi (Australia) S Mendez	4	2
3	(Brazil) L Pigossi (Spain) S Soler Espinosa	6	6
WC	(France) A Albié (France) M Partaud	2	6	[7]
2	(Romania) I Bara (Romania) M Buzărnescu	6	3	[10]

Semifinals
(Russia) V Ivakhnenko (Ukraine) A Vasylyeva	4	3
(Spain) C Bucșa (Australia) I Wallace	6	6
3	(Brazil) L Pigossi (Spain) S Soler Espinosa	1	2
2	(Romania) I Bara (Romania) M Buzărnescu	6	6

Final
(Spain) C Bucșa (Australia) I Wallace	3	1
2	(Romania) I Bara (Romania) M Buzărnescu	6	6
