= 2012 Open GDF Suez de Biarritz – Doubles =

Doubles
- 2012 Open GDF Suez de Biarritz

Final
- Champions: (France) Séverine Beltrame (France) Laura Thorpe
- Runners-up: (Spain) Lara Arruabarrena Vecino (Puerto Rico) Monica Puig
- Score: 6–2, 6–3

Events
| Singles | Doubles |
- Open GDF Suez de Biarritz

The 2012 Open GDF Suez de Biarritz – Doubles was the doubles event of the Open GDF Suez de Biarritz, an outdoor clay tournament of professional women's tennis.

Alexandra Panova and Urszula Radwańska were the defending champions, but both players chose not to participate.

== Seeds ==
1. (Luxembourg) Mandy Minella / (Switzerland) Stefanie Vögele (first round)
2. (Czech Republic) Eva Hrdinová / (Bosnia and Herzegovina) Mervana Jugić-Salkić (semifinals)
3. (France) Pauline Parmentier / (France) Virginie Razzano (first round)
4. (Czech Republic) Eva Birnerová / (Slovakia) Magdaléna Rybáriková (quarterfinals)

== Draw ==
Key

- Q = Qualifier
- WC = Wild card
- LL = Lucky loser
- Alt = Alternate
- ITF = ITF entry
- PR = Protected ranking
- SR = Special ranking
- SE = Special exempt
- JE = Junior exempt
- JR = Junior Accelerator Programme entrant
- CO = College Accelerator Programme entrant
- NG = Next Gen Accelerator Program entrant
- w/o = Walkover
- r = Retired
- d = Defaulted

=== Draw ===
First round
1 | (Luxembourg) M Minella (Switzerland) S Vögele | 7^{7} | 3 | [7]
(France) K Mladenovic (Switzerland) A Sadiković | 6^{4} | 6 | [10]
(France) E Morin Kougoucheff (France) J Ponchet | 6 | 6
(Russia) J Kushnereva (Italy) P Orlini Campos | 2 | 0
3 | (France) P Parmentier (France) V Razzano | 4 | 4
(Spain) L Arruabarrena Vecino (Puerto Rico) M Puig | 6 | 6
(Russia) A Gabueva (Georgia (country)) S Shapatava | w/o
(Germany) K Grajdek (France) A Hesse
(France) S Beltrame (France) L Thorpe | 6 | 6
(France) C Feuerstein (France) C Garcia | 4 | 4
(France) L Godallier (France) C Maisonnave | 1 | 2
4 | (Czech Republic) E Birnerová (Slovakia) M Rybáriková | 6 | 6
(France) A Cazeaux (France) S Sagaspe | 1 | 6 | [10]
(Spain) A Atucha Gómez (France) C Seateun | 6 | 4 | [5]
(Spain) L Costas (Spain) E Fernández-Brugués | 1 | 1
2 | (Czech Republic) E Hrdinová (Bosnia and Herzegovina) M Jugić-Salkić | 6 | 6

Quarterfinals
(France) K Mladenovic (Switzerland) A Sadiković | 6 | 6
(France) E Morin Kougoucheff (France) J Ponchet | 1 | 2
(Spain) L Arruabarrena Vecino (Puerto Rico) M Puig | 6 | 6
(Russia) A Gabueva (Georgia (country)) S Shapatava | 3 | 4
(France) S Beltrame (France) L Thorpe | 6 | 6
4 | (Czech Republic) E Birnerová (Slovakia) M Rybáriková | 2 | 3
(France) A Cazeaux (France) S Sagaspe
2 | (Czech Republic) E Hrdinová (Bosnia and Herzegovina) M Jugić-Salkić | w/o

Semifinals
(France) K Mladenovic (Switzerland) A Sadiković | 3 | 4
(Spain) L Arruabarrena Vecino (Puerto Rico) M Puig | 6 | 6
(France) S Beltrame (France) L Thorpe | 7^{7} | 6
2 | (Czech Republic) E Hrdinová (Bosnia and Herzegovina) M Jugić-Salkić | 6^{3} | 4

Finals
(Spain) L Arruabarrena Vecino (Puerto Rico) M Puig | 2 | 3
(France) S Beltrame (France) L Thorpe | 6 | 6
