= Amanda Carreras =

British tennis player

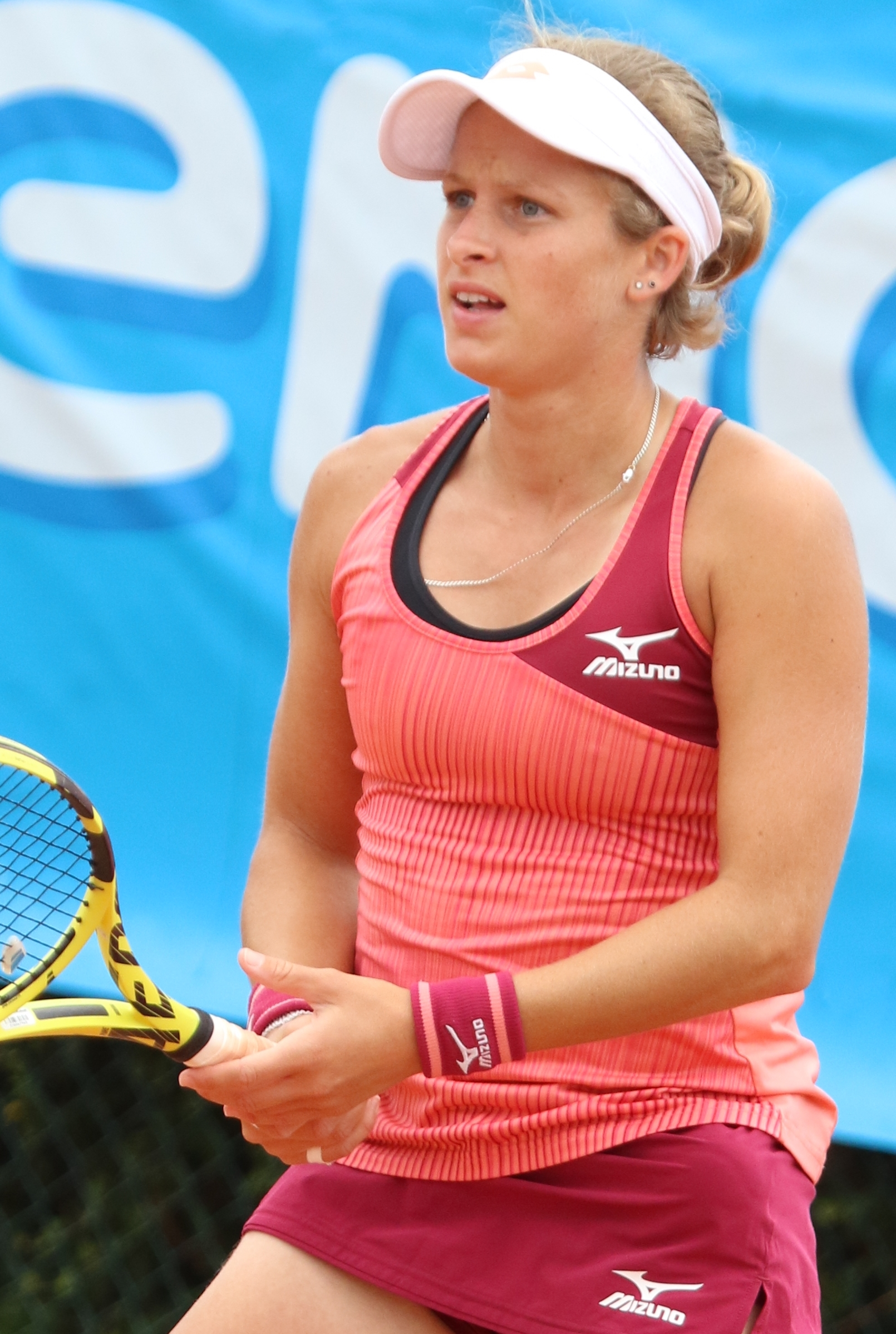
- Amanda Carreras at Biarritz, 2021
- Country (sports): United Kingdom; Gibraltar
- Born: 16 May 1990 (age 35); Gibraltar
- Turned pro: 2008
- Plays: Right-handed (two-handed backhand)
- Prize money: US$ 167,336

Singles
- Career record: 454–300
- Career titles: 11 ITF
- Highest ranking: No. 236 (24 April 2017)

Grand Slam singles results
- Wimbledon: Q1 (2013, 2015)

Doubles
- Career record: 136–96
- Career titles: 15 ITF
- Highest ranking: No. 279 (24 April 2017)
Medal record
Representing Gibraltar
Island Games
Gold medal – first place	2007 Rhodes	Women's singles
Gold medal – first place	2007 Rhodes	Women's team
Gold medal – first place	2011 Isle of Wight	Women's singles
Gold medal – first place	2011 Isle of Wight	Women's doubles
Gold medal – first place	2011 Isle of Wight	Women's team
Gold medal – first place	2019 Gibraltar	Women's singles
Gold medal – first place	2019 Gibraltar	Women's doubles
Gold medal – first place	2019 Gibraltar	Women's team
Silver medal – second place	2007 Rhodes	Mixed doubles
- Last updated on: 29 August 2024.

Amanda Carreras (born 16 May 1990) is an inactive British tennis player from Gibraltar.

Carreras has won 11 singles and 15 doubles titles on the ITF Women's Circuit. On 24 April 2017, she reached her best singles ranking of world No. 236, and peaked at No. 279 in the doubles rankings.

Due to Carreras winning her first two singles and doubles titles back-to-back, the ITF website wrote a "Spotlight On…" article on Carreras in May 2009.

On 24 July 2012, Carreras carried the Olympic flame in the torch relay in Ealing, London. Nicola Bosio (another Gibraltarian athlete) passed on the flame to Amanda who was described as one of Gibraltar's finest sportswomen.

The three additional gold medals, she won at her home Island Games in 2019, pushed her total up to nine medals, eight of them gold, and made her the most decorated athlete in the history of the games. As well as this, she holds a 12–0 record in singles and has won half of all her singles matches without the loss of a single game, twice in 2011, and in all four of her matches in 2019.

With a total of 401 singles match-wins, Carreras is ranked fourth all time amongst female British tennis players, and second amongst active players for most single wins. As well as 353 of those wins being on clay, she has won more matches on the surface out of any British player, male or female. With this impressive feat it is surprising, she has never been nominated to play in a Fed Cup tie, especially given the GB is 0–3 in Fed Cup ties since Carreras professional debut back in 2008 and has a win/loss total of 4–9 on clay.

In addition, Carreras competed in the 2010 Commonwealth games held in Delhi where she reached the round of 16 in singles, after winning her opening-round match 6–0, 6–0 against Tiriata Keeba of Kiribati, but then lost to eventual fourth placer and sixth seed, Olivia Rogowska of Australia, 2–6, 4–6. Thus far, 2010 has been the only time tennis has ever been included in the games' program.

She has twice beaten Garbiñe Muguruza on the ITF Circuit, including back in May 2009 to win her first title in Ankara, Turkey with a score of 7–5, 7–5. Muguruza would later go on to become world No. 1 in 2017, and capture two Grand Slam titles at Roland Garros and Wimbledon.

== Career ==
=== Junior career (2004–2008) ===
Carreras only competed in a total of nine tournaments over the course of her junior career, reaching the quarterfinals in only one of them. As a doubles competitor she reached two semifinals and two quarterfinals. By July 2008, when she played in her last junior tournament, she had accumulated win–loss records of 8–9 in singles and 8–8 in doubles. Her career-high combined junior ranking was world No. 548 (achieved on 18 July 2005).

=== 2006–2007 ===
Carreras first competed on senior events in February 2006, but during the rest of the year she failed to pass the second round in any of her tournaments. She ended 2006 without a world ranking.

She continued competing on the ITF Women's Circuit in 2007 and reached her first ever quarterfinal as a qualifier in July at a $10k clay-court event in Tampere, Finland. In her very next tournament (also a $10k clay-court event), she again managed to qualify and this time she reached her very first ITF semifinal. She ended the 2007 season with a ranking of world No. 873.

=== 2008 ===
In March 2008, Carreras reached another ITF quarterfinal, this time in Antalya. In May, she reached her first ever ITF final in a $10k event in Tortosa where she was beaten by Beatriz García Vidagany. She reached the final in her very next tournament where she lost to Elitsa Kostova, in three sets. In August she reached another semifinal and in September and October she reached three more quarterfinals. In November, she again fell just short of winning a tournament when she lost in the final of a $10k event in El Menzah, Tunisia. Her ranking at the end of 2008 had risen almost 300 places to world No. 591.

=== 2009 ===
Carreras began her 2009 season on clay courts and reached another $10k semifinal in March. She followed this up by reaching the quarterfinals of her following tournament which was also a $10k event. Carreras continued competing on the ITF Circuit without any notable result until May, when she reached the semifinals of a $10k tournament in Badalona, Spain. She then headed to Antalya where she won both the singles and doubles in two consecutive events, giving her the first four ITF titles of her career and prompting the official ITF website to feature her in their "Spotlight On…" article for May. This momentum then carried her to another semifinal in her next tournament, when Nataša Zorić from Serbia ended her winning streak of 13 singles matches. Despite this promising first part of the year, Carreras did not pass the second round in any of her remaining tournaments in 2009 with the exception of one quarterfinal showing in late October and one runner-up position in another $10k clay-court event in late November. By the end of 2009, her singles ranking was world No. 423.

== ITF Circuit finals ==
=== Singles: 24 (11 titles, 13 runner–ups) ===
Legend $25,000 tournaments $15,000 tournaments $10,000 tournaments	Finals by surface Hard (0–3) Clay (10–10) Carpet (1–0)

Result	W–L	Date	Tournament	Tier	Surface	Opponent	Score
Loss	0–1	May 2008	ITF Tortosa, Spain	10,000	Clay	(Spain) Beatriz García Vidagany	2–6, 3–6
Loss	0–2	Jun 2008	ITF Alcobaça, Portugal	10,000	Hard	(Bulgaria) Elitsa Kostova	6–3, 2–6, 2–6
Loss	0–3	Nov 2008	ITF El Menzah, Tunisia	10,000	Hard	(Italy) Federica Grazioso	6–2, 6–7^{(5)}, 4–6
Win	1–3	May 2009	ITF Antalya, Turkey	10,000	Clay	(Spain) Garbiñe Muguruza	7–5, 7–5
Win	2–3	May 2009	ITF Antalya, Turkey	10,000	Clay	(Sweden) Sandra Roma	7–6^{(7)}, 6–7^{(2)}, 6–4
Loss	2–4	Nov 2009	ITF La Vall d'Uixó, Spain	10,000	Clay	(France) Laura Thorpe	2–6, 2–6
Win	3–4	Nov 2010	ITF La Marsa, Tunisia	10,000	Clay	(Italy) Erika Zanchetta	7–6^{(4)}, 6–0
Win	4–4	May 2012	ITF Getxo, Spain	10,000	Clay	(Spain) Yvonne Cavallé Reimers	6–3, 4–6, 6–4
Loss	4–5	Sep 2012	ITF Madrid, Spain	10,000	Clay (i)	(Argentina) Tatiana Búa	3–6, 5–7
Loss	4–6	Oct 2012	ITF Buenos Aires, Argentina	25,000	Clay	(Brazil) Teliana Pereira	1–6, 2–6
Win	5–6	Nov 2014	ITF Vinaròs, Spain	10,000	Clay	(Czech Republic) Diana Šumová	6–4, 6–1
Loss	5–7	Nov 2014	ITF Castellón, Spain	10,000	Clay	(Spain) Olga Sáez Larra	6–3, 1–6, 2–6
Win	6–7	Feb 2015	ITF Palma Nova, Spain	10,000	Clay	(Spain) Olga Sáez Larra	6–4, 7–6^{(3)}
Win	7–7	Feb 2015	ITF Palma Nova, Spain	10,000	Clay	(Spain) Cristina Bucșa	7–5, 6–0
Loss	7–8	Apr 2015	ITF Cairo, Egypt	15,000	Clay	(Poland) Katarzyna Kawa	5–7, 1–6
Win	8–8	Sep 2015	ITF Pula, Italy	10,000	Clay	(Italy) Jessica Pieri	6–4, 6–3
Win	9–8	Nov 2015	ITF Benicarló, Spain	10,000	Clay	(Czech Republic) Diana Šumová	6–3, 6–2
Loss	9–9	May 2016	Chiasso Open, Switzerland	25,000	Clay	(Bulgaria) Isabella Shinikova	3–6, 6–7^{(1)}
Loss	9–10	Nov 2016	ITF Oslo, Norway	10,000	Hard (i)	(Sweden) Jacqueline Cabaj Awad	3–6, 3–6
Loss	9–11	Nov 2016	ITF Benicarló, Spain	10,000	Clay	(France) Jessika Ponchet	0–6, 6–7^{(6)}
Win	10–11	Nov 2018	ITF Solarino, Italy	15,000	Carpet	(Argentina) Catalina Pella	6–4, 3–6, 7–5
Win	11–11	Mar 2019	ITF Le Havre, France	15,000	Clay (i)	(France) Émeline Dartron	4–6, 6–3, 6–1
Loss	11–12	Apr 2019	ITF Tabarka, Tunisia	15,000	Clay	(Spain) Rosa Vicens Mas	4–6, 2–6
Loss	11–13	Oct 2020	ITF Platja d'Aro, Spain	15,000	Clay	(Switzerland) Sebastianna Scilipoti	4–6, 4–6

=== Doubles: 26 (15 titles, 11 runner–ups) ===
Legend $25,000 tournaments $15,000 tournaments $10,000 tournaments	Finals by surface Hard (1–2) Clay (14–9)

Result	W–L	Date	Tournament	Tier	Surface	Partner	Opponents	Score
Loss	0–1	May 2008	ITF Badalona, Spain	10,000	Clay	(Spain) Maite Gabarrús-Alonso	(Italy) Benedetta Davato (Italy) Lisa Sabino	6–2, 2–6, [8–10]
Win	1–1	May 2009	ITF Antalya, Turkey	10,000	Clay	(Italy) Valentina Sulpizio	(Belgium) An-Sophie Mestach (Belgium) Sofie Oyen	4–6, 6–3, [10–4]
Win	2–1	May 2009	ITF Antalya, Turkey	10,000	Clay	(Italy) Valentina Sulpizio	(Sweden) Julia Klackenberg (Sweden) Sandra Roma	6–0, 6–3
Loss	2–2	Aug 2009	ITF Vienna, Austria	10,000	Clay	(Austria) Raphaela Zotta	(Czech Republic) Jana Jandová (Slovakia) Monika Kochanová	5–7, 7–5, [14–16]
Loss	2–3	Oct 2009	ITF Antalya, Turkey	10,000	Clay	(Italy) Valentine Confalonieri	(Turkey) Çağla Büyükakçay (Uzbekistan) Albina Khabibulina	6–2, 5–7, [7–10]
Win	3–3	Nov 2009	ITF La Vall d'Uixó, Spain	10,000	Clay	(Spain) Lara Arruabarrena	(Spain) Yera Campos Molina (Spain) Sandra Soler Sola	6–4, 3–6, [11–9]
Win	4–3	May 2010	ITF Rio de Janeiro, Brazil	25,000	Clay	(Peru) Bianca Botto	(Bolivia) María Fernanda Álvarez Terán (Slovenia) Andreja Klepač	3–6, 6–4, [10–8]
Win	5–3	Nov 2010	ITF La Marsa, Tunisia	10,000	Clay	(Spain) Sheila Solsona Carcasona	(Mexico) Ximena Hermoso (Mexico) Ivette López	6–4, 7–5
Win	6–3	Nov 2010	ITF La Vall d'Uixó, Spain	10,000	Clay	(Venezuela) Andrea Gámiz	(Spain) Lara Arruabarrena (Italy) Benedetta Davato	7–6^{(5)}, 6–3
Win	7–3	Jun 2011	ITF Montemor-o-Novo, Portugal	10,000	Hard	(Venezuela) Andrea Gámiz	(Mexico) Ximena Hermoso (Mexico) Ivette López	6–3, 6–4
Loss	7–4	Aug 2011	ITF Gijón, Spain	10,000	Hard	(Venezuela) Andrea Gámiz	(Republic of Ireland) Amy Bowtell (United Kingdom) Lucy Brown	w/o
Loss	7–5	Nov 2011	ITF Vinaròs, Spain	10,000	Clay	(Spain) Carolina Prats Millán	(Italy) Anastasia Grymalska (Russia) Evgeniya Pashkova	3–6, 1–6
Loss	7–6	Apr 2012	ITF Vic, Spain	10,000	Clay	(Mexico) Ximena Hermoso	(Russia) Evgeniya Pashkova (Bulgaria) Isabella Shinikova	1–6, 2–6
Loss	7–7	Oct 2013	ITF Sant Cugat del Vallès, Spain	25,000	Clay	(Spain) Lara Arruabarrena	(Argentina) Tatiana Búa (Venezuela) Andrea Gámiz	6–4, 2–6, [7–10]
Win	8–7	Feb 2015	ITF Palma Nova, Spain	10,000	Clay	(Italy) Alice Savoretti	(Romania) Irina Bara (Hungary) Ágnes Bukta	6–4, 6–1
Win	9–7	Jul 2015	ITF Viserba, Italy	10,000	Clay	(Italy) Alice Savoretti	(Italy) Martina di Giuseppe (Italy) Giorgia Marchetti	6–3, 3–6, [10–3]
Win	10–7	Oct 2015	ITF La Vall d'Uixó, Spain	10,000	Clay	(Italy) Alice Savoretti	(Spain) María Cañero Pérez (Spain) María Gutiérrez Carrasco	6–1, 6–2
Win	11–7	Nov 2015	ITF Benicarló, Spain	10,000	Clay	(Italy) Alice Savoretti	(Ukraine) Oleksandra Korashvili (Romania) Ioana Loredana Roșca	6–3, 6–2
Loss	11–8	Feb 2016	ITF Palma Nova, Spain	10,000	Clay	(Italy) Alice Savoretti	(Russia) Valeria Savinykh (Ukraine) Alyona Sotnikova	6–2, 4–6, [6–10]
Loss	11–9	Mar 2016	ITF Heraklion, Greece	10,000	Hard	(Italy) Alice Savoretti	(Russia) Aleksandra Pospelova (Russia) Alina Silich	2–6, 2–6
Win	12–9	May 2016	ITF Caserta, Italy	25,000	Clay	(Italy) Alice Savoretti	(Ukraine) Oleksandra Korashvili (Russia) Maria Marfutina	6–7^{(9)}, 7–6^{(5)}, [10–6]
Win	13–9	Jun 2016	ITF Nieuwpoort, Belgium	10,000	Clay	(Italy) Alice Savoretti	(Belgium) Steffi Distelmans (Netherlands) Quirine Lemoine	6–2, 6–7^{(4)}, [10–8]
Loss	13–10	Jul 2016	ITF Denain, France	25,000	Clay	(Italy) Alice Savoretti	(Slovakia) Michaela Hončová (France) Shérazad Reix	1–6, 3–6
Win	14–10	Nov 2016	ITF Benicarló, Spain	10,000	Clay	(Ecuador) Charlotte Römer	(Ukraine) Oleksandra Korashvili (Australia) Isabelle Wallace	5–7, 6–3, [10–7]
Loss	14–11	Apr 2017	ITF Pelham, United States	25,000	Clay	(Croatia) Tena Lukas	(United States) Emina Bektas (United States) Sanaz Marand	w/o
Win	15–11	Apr 2019	ITF Tabarka, Tunisia	15,000	Clay	(Spain) Ángela Fita Boluda	(United States) Sarah Lee (Belgium) Chelsea Vanhoutte	6–2, 6–3
