= 2012 Open GDF Suez de Biarritz – Singles =

Singles
- 2012 Open GDF Suez de Biarritz

Final
- Champion: (Switzerland) Romina Oprandi
- Runner-up: (Luxembourg) Mandy Minella
- Score: 7–5, 7–5

Events
Singles	Doubles
- Open GDF Suez de Biarritz

The 2012 Open GDF Suez de Biarritz – Singles was the singles event of the Open GDF Suez de Biarritz, a professional women's tennis tournament played on outdoor clay courts in the city of Biarritz, in France.

Pauline Parmentier, the defending champion, was eliminated in the semi-finals.

== Seeds ==
1. (France) Pauline Parmentier (semifinals)
2. (Netherlands) Arantxa Rus (semifinals)
3. (France) Mathilde Johansson (first round)
4. (Luxembourg) Mandy Minella (final)
5. (Switzerland) Romina Oprandi (champion)
6. (France) Virginie Razzano (quarterfinals)
7. (Czech Republic) Eva Birnerová (quarterfinals)
8. (Italy) Alberta Brianti (second round)

== Main draw ==
Key

- Q = Qualifier
- WC = Wild card
- LL = Lucky loser
- Alt = Alternate
- ITF = ITF entry
- PR = Protected ranking
- SR = Special ranking
- SE = Special exempt
- JE = Junior exempt
- JR = Junior Accelerator Programme entrant
- CO = College Accelerator Programme entrant
- NG = Next Gen Accelerator Program entrant
- w/o = Walkover
- r = Retired
- d = Defaulted

=== Finals ===
Semifinals
1	(France) Pauline Parmentier	2	3
4	(Luxembourg) Mandy Minella	6	6
5	(Switzerland) Romina Oprandi	6	6
2	(Netherlands) Arantxa Rus	2	3

Final
4	(Luxembourg) Mandy Minella	5	5
5	(Switzerland) Romina Oprandi	7	7

=== Top half ===
First round
1	(France) P Parmentier	6	6
Q	(Norway) U Eikeri	1	1
(Puerto Rico) M Puig	4	6	5
(Portugal) MJ Koehler	6	4	7
WC	(France) K Mladenovic	6	6
(Germany) T Malek	3	1
LL	(Russia) A Gabueva	4	1
7	(Czech Republic) E Birnerová	6	6
4	(Luxembourg) M Minella	6	6
(France) C Garcia	3	3
(Spain) G Muguruza	3	6	3
(Spain) L Costas	6	4	6
(France) L Thorpe	6	3	2
(France) C Feuerstein	0	6	6
Q	(Georgia (country)) S Shapatava	4	6	1
6	(France) V Razzano	6	2	6

Second round
1	(France) P Parmentier	6	6
(Portugal) MJ Koehler	3	3
WC	(France) K Mladenovic	7	2	3
7	(Czech Republic) E Birnerová	5	6	6
4	(Luxembourg) M Minella	3	7	7
(Spain) L Costas	6	5	5
(France) C Feuerstein	2	1
6	(France) V Razzano	6	6

Quarterfinals
1	(France) P Parmentier	7^{7}	6
7	(Czech Republic) E Birnerová	6^{4}	2
4	(Luxembourg) M Minella	6	3	7
6	(France) V Razzano	3	6	5

Semifinals
1	(France) P Parmentier	2	3
4	(Luxembourg) M Minella	6	6

=== Bottom half ===
First round
5	(Switzerland) R Oprandi	6	6
Q	(Poland) P Sanduska	4	1
(Switzerland) A Sadiković	6	5	5
(Switzerland) S Vögele	1	7	7
(Slovakia) M Rybáriková	6	3	6
(Spain) L Arruabarrena Vecino	4	6	3
(Argentina) P Ormaechea	6	7
3	(France) M Johansson	3	5
8	(Italy) A Brianti	6	6
(United States) J Craybas	2	0
Q	(Bosnia and Herzegovina) M Jugić-Salkić	6	6
(Spain) E Fernández-Brugués	1	2
(France) A Rezaï	3	6	0
(France) S Beltrame	6	4	6
LL	(France) A Hesse	2	1
2	(Netherlands) A Rus	6	6

Second round
5	(Switzerland) R Oprandi	6	6
(Switzerland) S Vögele	4	3
(Slovakia) M Rybáriková	6	6
(Argentina) P Ormaechea	2	2
8	(Italy) A Brianti	6^{4}	1
Q	(Bosnia and Herzegovina) M Jugić-Salkić	7^{7}	6
(France) S Beltrame	3	1
2	(Netherlands) A Rus	6	6

Quarterfinals
5	(Switzerland) R Oprandi	6^{3}	6	6
(Slovakia) M Rybáriková	7^{7}	3	3
Q	(Bosnia and Herzegovina) M Jugić-Salkić	3	7	1
2	(Netherlands) A Rus	6	5	6

Semifinals
5	(Switzerland) R Oprandi	6	6
2	(Netherlands) A Rus	2	3
