= Olga Sáez Larra =

Spanish tennis player (born 1994)

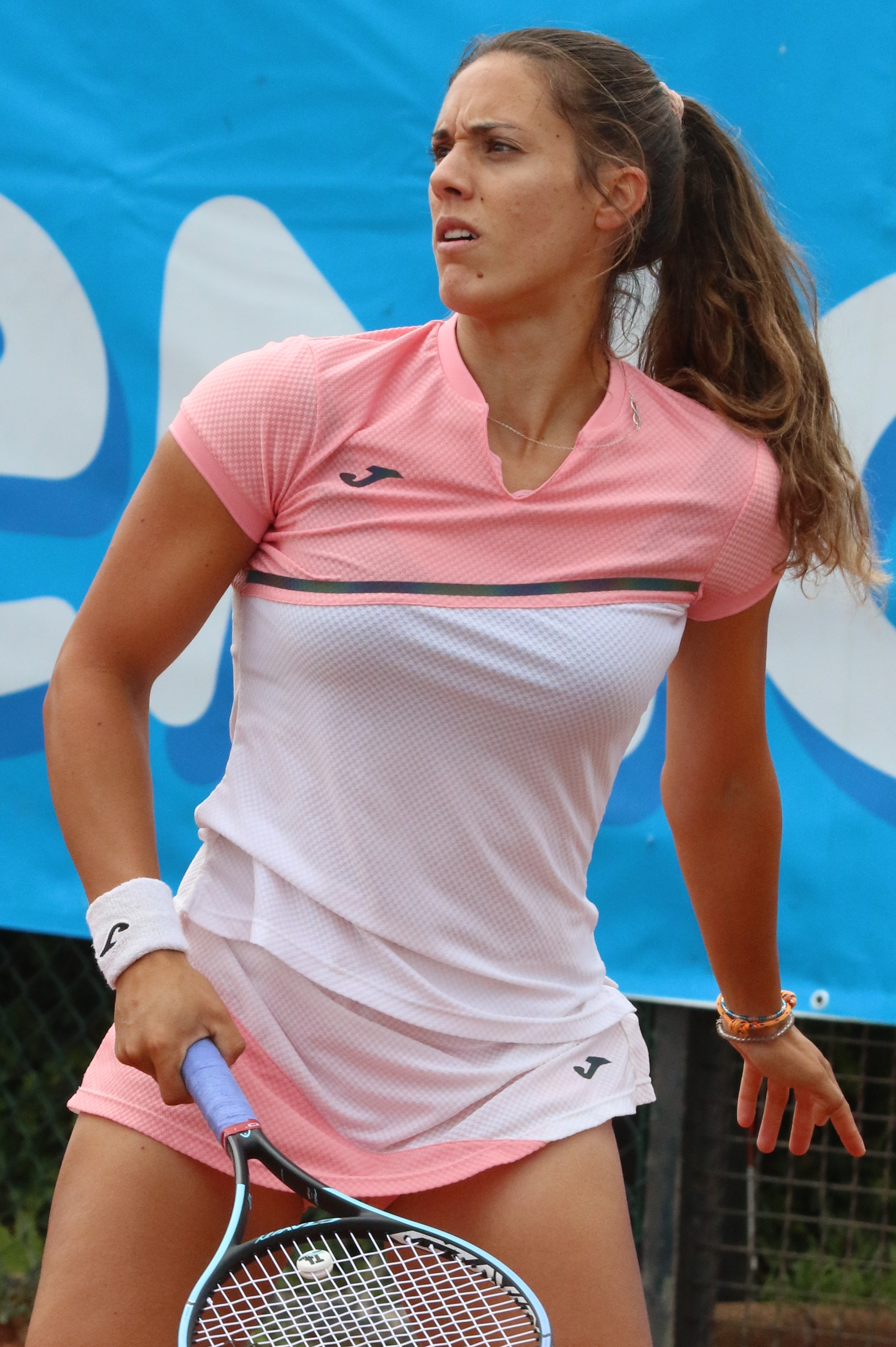
- Country (sports): Spain
- Born: 18 September 1994 (age 30)
- Retired: 2022
- Plays: Right (two-handed backhand)
- Prize money: $144,574

Singles
- Career record: 392–266
- Career titles: 11 ITF
- Highest ranking: No. 231 (22 May 2017)

Doubles
- Career record: 93–45
- Career titles: 14 ITF
- Highest ranking: No. 356 (17 April 2017)

Olga Sáez Larra (Spanish pronunciation: [ˈolɣa ˈsaeθ ˈlara]; born 18 September 1994) is a Spanish former tennis player.

Sáez Larra has career-high WTA rankings of 231 in singles and 356 in doubles. In her career, she won 11 singles and 14 doubles titles at tournaments of the ITF Women's Circuit.

Sáez Larra represented Spain in Fed Cup competition in 2017, when she lost her first and also last match.

== ITF Circuit finals ==
=== Singles: 23 (11 titles, 12 runner–ups) ===
Legend $25,000 tournaments $10/15,000 tournaments	Finals by surface Clay (11–11) Carpet (0–1)

Result	W–L	Date	Tournament	Tier	Surface	Opponent	Score
Loss	0–1	May 2012	ITF Cantanhede, Portugal	10,000	Carpet	(France) Charlène Seateun	6–4, 3–6, 4–6
Loss	0–2	Nov 2012	ITF La Vall d'Uixó, Spain	10,000	Clay	(Spain) Sara Sorribes Tormo	1–6, 1–6
Win	1–2	Nov 2013	ITF Vinaròs, Spain	10,000	Clay	(Egypt) Mayar Sherif	4–6, 7–5, 6–4
Loss	1–3	Nov 2013	ITF Castellón, Spain	10,000	Clay	(Spain) Lucía Cervera Vázquez	1–6, 0–6
Win	2–3	Nov 2013	ITF Nules, Spain	10,000	Clay	(Switzerland) Lisa Sabino	6–3, 6–2
Win	3–3	Jun 2014	ITF Madrid, Spain	10,000	Clay (i)	(Spain) Lucía Cervera Vázquez	6–4, 3–6, 7–5
Loss	3–4	Jun 2014	ITF Madrid, Spain	10,000	Clay	(Spain) Lucía Cervera Vázquez	6–7^{(5)}, 3–6
Loss	3–5	Jul 2014	ITF Getxo, Spain	10,000	Clay	(Spain) Laura Pous Tió	7–6^{(4)}, 3–6, 5–7
Loss	3–6	Aug 2014	ITF Rotterdam, Netherlands	10,000	Clay	(Netherlands) Quirine Lemoine	3–6, 6–3, 2–6
Loss	3–7	Sep 2014	ITF Madrid, Spain	10,000	Clay	(Spain) Lucía Cervera Vázquez	3–6, 3–6
Win	4–7	Nov 2014	ITF Castellón, Spain	10,000	Clay	(United Kingdom) Amanda Carreras	3–6, 6–1, 6–2
Win	5–7	Nov 2014	ITF Nules, Spain	10,000	Clay	(Spain) Yvonne Cavallé Reimers	6–2, 6–4
Loss	5–8	Feb 2015	ITF Palma Nova, Spain	10,000	Clay	(United Kingdom) Amanda Carreras	4–6, 6–7^{(3)}
Win	6–8	Jun 2015	ITF Madrid, Spain	10,000	Clay	(Spain) Estrella Cabeza Candela	6–4, 6–0
Win	7–8	Feb 2016	ITF Palma Nova, Spain	10,000	Clay	(Australia) Isabelle Wallace	6–2, 6–4
Loss	7–9	Mar 2016	ITF Gonesse, France	10,000	Clay (i)	(Liechtenstein) Kathinka von Deichmann	3–6, 6–3, 4–6
Loss	7–10	Jun 2016	ITF Périgueux, France	25,000	Clay	(Switzerland) Jil Teichmann	3–6, 3–6
Win	8–10	Dec 2016	ITF Nules, Spain	10,000	Clay	(Ukraine) Oleksandra Korashvili	6–2, 4–6, 6–2
Win	9–10	Feb 2017	ITF Palma Nova, Spain	15,000	Clay	(Spain) Irene Burillo Escorihuela	6–4, 6–7^{(3)}, 6–2
Win	10–10	May 2017	ITF Lleida, Spain	25,000	Clay	(Spain) Georgina García Pérez	6–4, 7–6^{(6)}
Loss	10–11	Aug 2017	ITF Braunschweig, Germany	25,000	Clay	(Poland) Magdalena Fręch	2–6, 6–2, 6–7^{(3)}
Loss	10–12	Jul 2018	ITF Getxo, Spain	25,000	Clay	(Spain) Aliona Bolsova	0–6, 1–6
Win	11–12	Nov 2018	ITF Sant Cugat, Spain	25,000	Clay	(Romania) Andreea Roșca	6–1, 1–0 ret.

=== Doubles: 20 (14 titles, 6 runner–ups) ===
Legend $25,000 tournaments $10/15,000 tournaments	Finals by surface Hard (4–0) Clay (10–6)

Result	W–L	Date	Tournament	Tier	Surface	Partner	Opponents	Score
Win	1–0	Feb 2011	ITF Vale do Lobo, Portugal	10,000	Hard	(Spain) Rocío de la Torre Sánchez	(Norway) Ulrikke Eikeri (United Kingdom) Anna Fitzpatrick	w/o
Win	2–0	Jun 2011	ITF Madrid, Spain	10,000	Hard	(Spain) Rocío de la Torre Sánchez	(Bulgaria) Isabella Shinikova (Bulgaria) Julia Stamatova	6–4, 4–6, [10–8]
Win	3–0	Jun 2011	ITF Madrid, Spain	10,000	Hard	(Spain) Rocío de la Torre Sánchez	(Switzerland) Lisa Sabino (Italy) Andreea Văideanu	7–6^{(2)}, 6–4
Win	4–0	Mar 2014	ITF Pula, Italy	10,000	Clay	(Australia) Alexandra Nancarrow	(Greece) Despina Papamichail (Netherlands) Rosalie van der Hoek	6–3, 4–6, [10–8]
Loss	4–1	Apr 2014	ITF Pula, Italy	10,000	Clay	(Spain) Yvonne Cavallé Reimers	(Latvia) Jeļena Ostapenko (Netherlands) Rosalie van der Hoek	1–6, 6–2, [6–10]
Win	5–1	Jun 2014	ITF Madrid, Spain	10,000	Clay (i)	(Spain) Silvia García Jiménez	(Spain) Yvonne Cavallé Reimers (Spain) Lucía Cervera Vázquez	6–4, 6–3
Loss	5–2	Jun 2014	ITF Madrid, Spain	10,000	Clay	(Ecuador) Charlotte Römer	(Spain) Yvonne Cavallé Reimers (Spain) Lucía Cervera Vázquez	2–6, 6–4, [5–10]
Win	6–2	Jul 2014	ITF Getxo, Spain	10,000	Clay	(Ecuador) Charlotte Römer	(Australia) Alexandra Nancarrow (Spain) Olga Parres Azcoitia	6–4, 7–5
Win	7–2	Sep 2014	ITF Madrid, Spain	10,000	Clay	(Spain) Aliona Bolsova	(Spain) Marta Huqi González (Spain) Estela Pérez-Somarriba	6–1, 6–4
Win	8–2	Nov 2014	ITF Nules, Spain	10,000	Clay	(Australia) Alexandra Nancarrow	(Spain) Yvonne Cavallé Reimers (Spain) Aina Schaffner Riera	7–6^{(5)}, 7–6^{(5)}
Loss	8–3	Jun 2015	ITF Madrid, Spain	10,000	Clay	(Spain) Sílvia García Jiménez	(Spain) Estrella Cabeza Candela (Spain) Cristina Sánchez Quintanar	6–4, 4–6, [7–10]
Loss	8–4	Sep 2015	ITF Madrid, Spain	10,000	Clay	(Spain) María Martínez	(Spain) Estrella Cabeza Candela (Spain) Cristina Sánchez Quintanar	4–6, 3–6
Win	9–4	Nov 2015	ITF Castellón, Spain	10,000	Clay	(Spain) Noelia Bouzó Zanotti	(Ukraine) Oleksandra Korashvili (Romania) Ioana Loredana Roșca	6–3, 7–5
Win	10–4	Nov 2015	ITF Nules, Spain	10,000	Clay	(Ecuador) Charlotte Römer	(Spain) Ariadna Martí Riembau (Spain) Marta Sexmilo Pascual	6–2, 6–3
Loss	10–5	Feb 2016	ITF Tarragona, Spain	10,000	Clay	(Spain) Georgina García Pérez	(Romania) Irina Bara (Ukraine) Alyona Sotnikova	5–7, 6–3, [8–10]
Win	11–5	Sep 2016	ITF Clermont-Ferrand, France	25,000	Hard (i)	(Spain) Georgina García Pérez	(France) Manon Arcangioli (Croatia) Silvia Njirić	6–2, 3–6, [10–2]
Win	12–5	Dec 2016	ITF Nules, Spain	10,000	Clay	(Ecuador) Charlotte Römer	(Ukraine) Oleksandra Korashvili (Brazil) Laura Pigossi	6–4, 6–2
Win	13–5	Feb 2017	ITF Manacor, Spain	15,000	Clay	(Spain) María Teresa Torró Flor	(Spain) Yvonne Cavallé Reimers (Ecuador) Charlotte Römer	6–3, 6–2
Loss	13–6	Feb 2017	ITF Palma Nova, Spain	15,000	Clay	(Spain) Yvonne Cavallé Reimers	(Germany) Katharina Gerlach (Germany) Katharina Hobgarski	4–6, 4–6
Win	14–6	Dec 2017	ITF Nules, Spain	25,000	Clay	(Ecuador) Charlotte Römer	(Netherlands) Cindy Burger (Russia) Yana Sizikova	2–6, 6–1, [10–7]

== Fed Cup participation ==
=== Doubles (0–1) ===
Edition	Stage	Date	Location	Against	Surface	Partner	Opponents	W/L	Score
2017 Fed Cup	WG P/O	23 Apr 2017	Roanne, France	France	Clay (i)	(Spain) María José Martínez Sánchez	(France) Alizé Cornet (France) Amandine Hesse	L	1–6, 6–3, [7–10]
