= Irina Bara =

Romanian tennis player (born 1995)

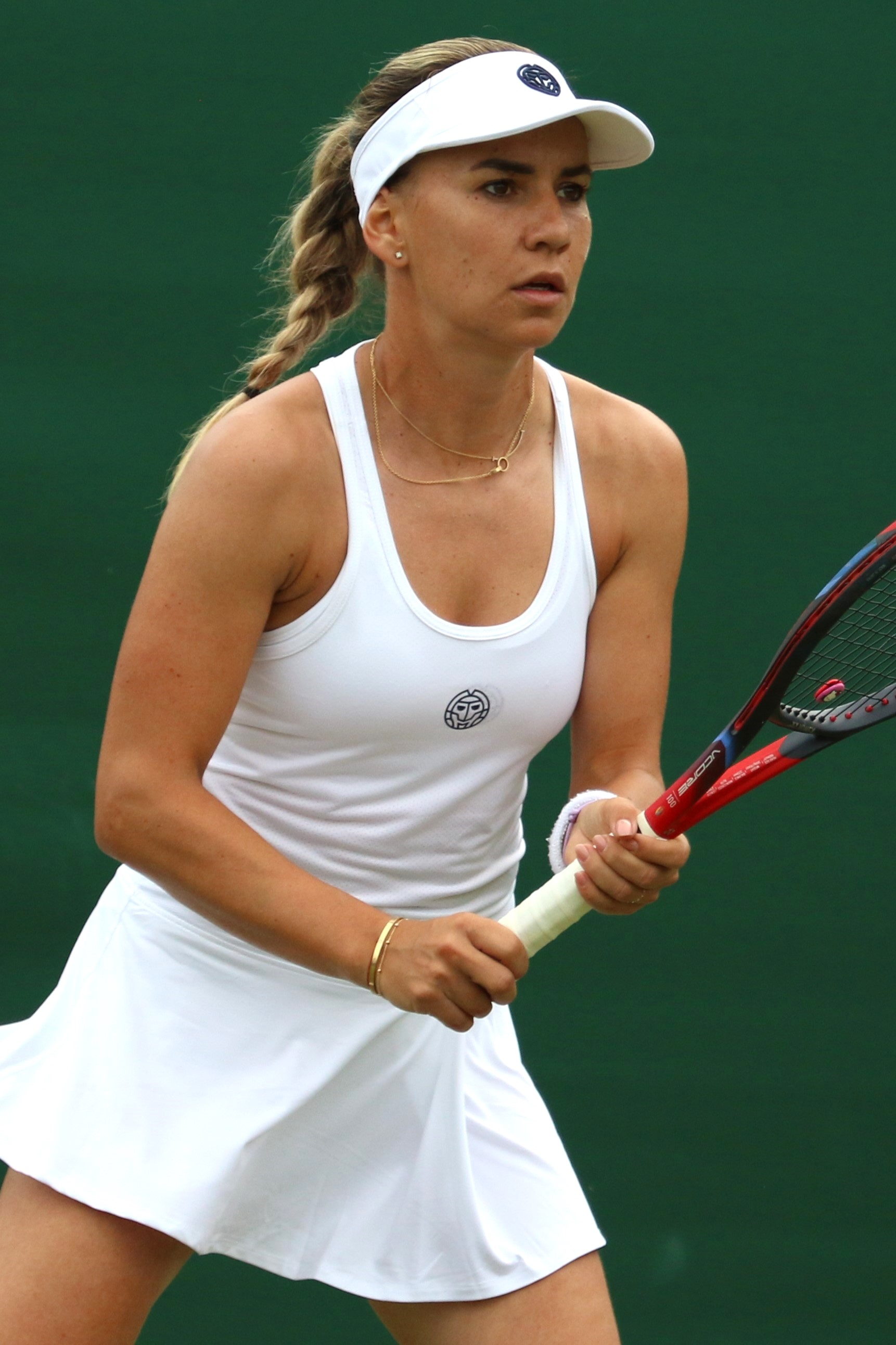
- Bara at the 2023 Wimbledon Championships
- Full name: Irina Maria Bara
- Country (sports): Romania
- Born: 18 March 1995 (age 31) Ștei, Romania
- Height: 1.64 m (5 ft 5 in)
- Plays: Right (two-handed backhand)
- Prize money: US$ 1,631,763

Singles
- Career record: 440–324
- Career titles: 11 ITF
- Highest ranking: No. 104 (18 April 2022)

Grand Slam singles results
- Australian Open: 1R (2022)
- French Open: 3R (2020)
- Wimbledon: 2R (2022)
- US Open: Q2 (2017, 2023, 2024)

Doubles
- Career record: 371–207
- Career titles: 1 WTA, 5 WTA 125
- Highest ranking: No. 56 (13 May 2019)
- Current ranking: No. 158 (26 October 2026

Grand Slam doubles results
- Australian Open: 3R (2019)
- French Open: QF (2018)
- Wimbledon: 1R (2018, 2019, 2022)
- US Open: 1R (2018, 2022)

Team competitions
- Fed Cup: 0–2
- Last updated on: 29 October 2026.

Irina Maria Bara (born 18 March 1995) is a professional tennis player from Romania.

She has a career-high singles ranking of world No. 104, achieved on 18 April 2022. On 13 May 2019, she peaked at No. 56 in the WTA doubles rankings. She won her maiden WTA Tour doubles title at the 2021 Transylvania Open, partnering Ekaterine Gorgodze. Bara has also won five doubles titles on the WTA Challenger Tour, with 11 singles and 36 doubles titles on the ITF Circuit, most of them on clay.

In singles, she reached a 100k and an 80k finals, three finals at 60k events, but lost all of them, having 25k as the highest category tournament that she won. In doubles, she won a couple of 60k and 80k tournaments, but also won one 100k event, the 2016 Soho Square Tournament in Sharm El Sheik, Egypt.

Bara is better known for her performances in doubles, reaching the top 100. Her most significant result so far is a quarterfinal at the 2018 French Open, partnering with Mihaela Buzărnescu. In 2019, she also reached quarterfinals of the Madrid Open, again with Buzărnescu. In singles, her best result so far is a third round at the 2020 French Open on her Grand Slam singles debut, also her first major singles match win. The highest round she reached in singles is the quarterfinals, at the 2019 Baltic Open, while in doubles, she reached a couple of semifinals, but never a final. She made her WTA Tour main-draw debut at the 2015 Bucharest Open in the doubles event, partnering Buzărnescu, while her first match in a singles event was two years later, at the same tournament, when she, as a wildcard player, lost in the first round to Aliaksandra Sasnovich.

== Career ==
=== 2017–19: WTA Tour debut, first quarterfinal & top 200 ===
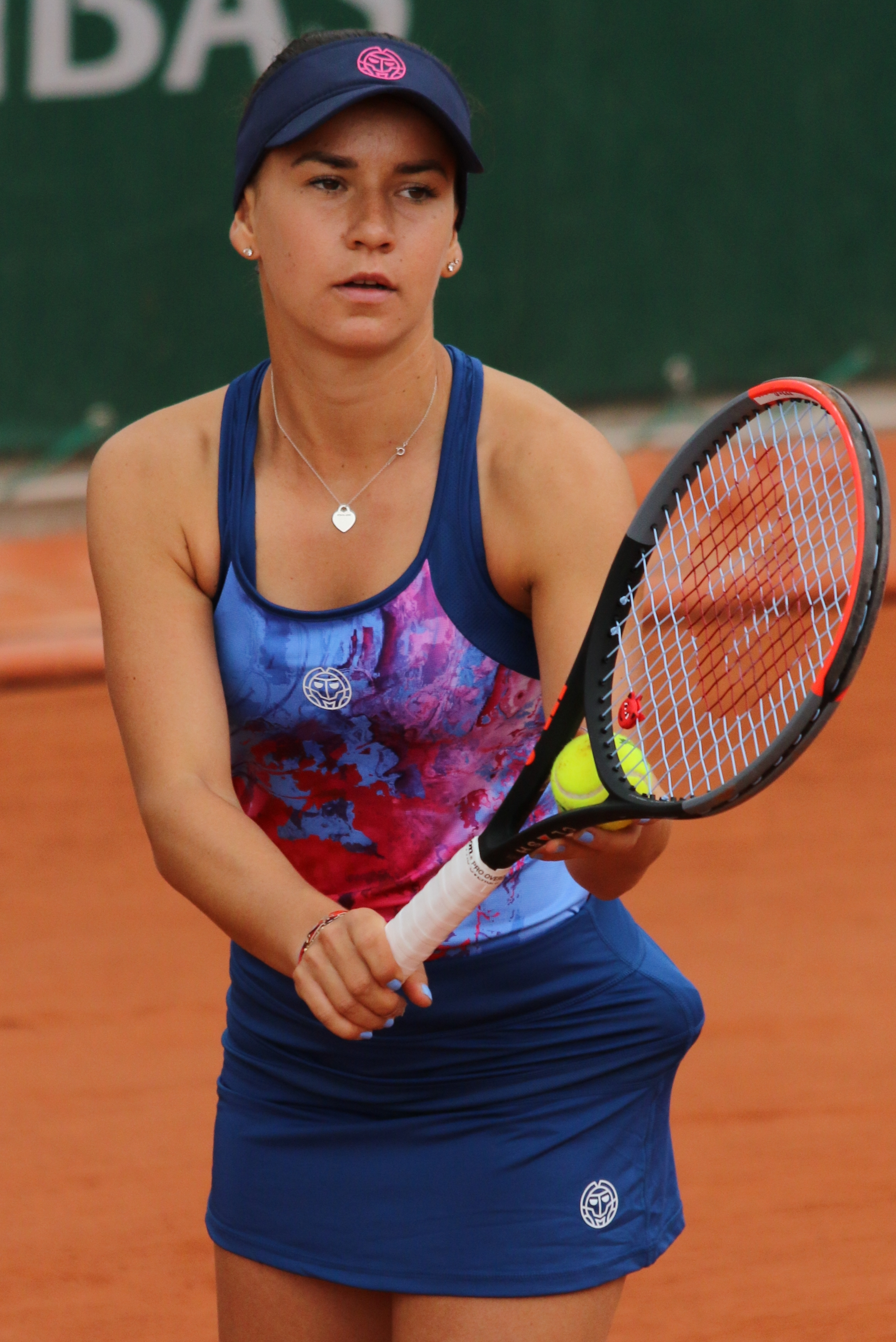
Bara at the 2019 French Open

Bara made her WTA Tour debut in singles at the 2017 Bucharest Open, when she lost as a wildcard player in the first round to Aliaksandra Sasnovich.

Her next WTA tournament was also there, in 2018; she realized her first WTA Tour singles match-win, defeating Viktoriya Tomova in the first round, and then lost to Polona Hercog. At the 2018 Moscow River Cup, she defeated Ekaterina Alexandrova before she was eliminated by Anastasija Sevastova in the second round.

In 2019, at the Baltic Open in Jūrmala, she reached her first and so far only quarterfinal, where she beat two Russian players, Margarita Gasparyan and Valentina Ivakhnenko, in the first two rounds, before losing to Sevastova. Her other WTA Tour performances that year were unsuccessful, losing in the first round in Acapulco to Beatriz Haddad Maia, in Bogotá to Sara Errani, in İstanbul to fellow Romanian Sorana Cîrstea, in Rabat to Hercog, and finally in Bucharest to Jaimee Fourlis.

On 17 July 2017, Bara entered top 200 for the first time, getting to No. 199. On 2 July 2018, she entered the top 150, reaching No. 150. On 13 August 2018, she rose to No. 139, her highest singles ranking until 2020. Until 2020, Bara did not reach a main-draw at any Grand Slam tournament. She failed in qualifying at all four events, in both 2018 and 2019, as well as at Wimbledon and the US Open in 2017.

=== 2020: Major debut & third round at the French Open ===
In March, Bara entered the main draw of the Lyon Open, passing through qualifying. In the main draw, she beat Tímea Babos, and then lost to Daria Kasatkina in the second round. In late September, Bara played the qualifying for the French Open, where she qualified for the first time for the main draw of a Grand Slam tournament. The other significant thing there was that she also recorded her first win, defeating 26th seed Donna Vekić in straight sets. She passed the second round due to the retirement of Alison Van Uytvanck. In the third round, against No. 3 seed Sofia Kenin, she won only two games. Two weeks later, Bara reached a new career-high singles ranking, as world No. 115.

=== 2021: First WTA Tour doubles & three more Challenger titles ===
In May, Bara played her first 100k final in Bonita Springs which she lost to Katie Volynets. She played in the main draw at the French Open but lost to Astra Sharma. As a result, she reached a new career-high singles ranking of world No. 112. In September, Irina won her first out of three WTA 125 titles in the season, partnering with Ekaterine Gorgodze. In October, Bara won her first WTA Tour title, playing again with Gorgodze at the Transylvania Open in her home country.

=== 2022: WTA 125 doubles title ===
Partnered with Sara Errani, Bara won the doubles title at the WTA 125 Argentina Open, defeating Jang Su-jeong and You Xiaodi in the final.

== Performance timelines ==
Key
| W | F | SF | QF | #R | RR | Q# | P# | DNQ | A | Z# | PO | G | S | B | NMS | NTI | P | NH |

(W) winner; (F) finalist; (SF) semifinalist; (QF) quarterfinalist; (#R) rounds 4, 3, 2, 1; (RR) round-robin stage; (Q#) qualification round; (P#) preliminary round; (DNQ) did not qualify; (A) absent; (Z#) Davis/Fed Cup Zonal Group (with number indication) or (PO) play-off; (G) gold, (S) silver or (B) bronze Olympic/Paralympic medal; (NMS) not a Masters tournament; (NTI) not a Tier I tournament; (P) postponed; (NH) not held; (SR) strike rate (events won / competed); (W–L) win–loss record.
To avoid confusion and double counting, these charts are updated at the conclusion of a tournament or when the player's participation has ended.

Only main-draw results in WTA Tour, Grand Slam tournaments, Billie Jean King Cup, United Cup, Hopman Cup and Olympic Games are included in win–loss records.

=== Singles ===
current through the 2025 WTA Tour

| Tournament | 2017 | 2018 | 2019 | 2020 | 2021 | 2022 | 2023 | 2024 | 2025 | SR | W–L |
|---|---|---|---|---|---|---|---|---|---|---|---|
Grand Slam tournaments
| Australian Open | A | Q2 | Q1 | Q1 | Q1 | 1R | Q1 | Q2 | A | 0 / 1 | 0–1 |
| French Open | A | Q3 | Q1 | 3R | 1R | 1R | A | Q1 | A | 0 / 3 | 2–3 |
| Wimbledon | Q1 | Q2 | Q2 | NH | Q1 | 2R | Q1 | Q1 | A | 0 / 1 | 1–1 |
| US Open | Q2 | Q1 | Q1 | A | Q1 | Q1 | Q2 | Q2 | A | 0 / 0 | 0–0 |
| Win–Loss | 0–0 | 0–0 | 0–0 | 2–1 | 0–1 | 1–3 | 0–0 | 0–0 | 0–0 | 0 / 4 | 3–5 |
National representation
| Billie Jean King Cup (Note: Formerly known as Fed Cup until 2020.) | A | A | A | QR (Note: Edition is split into the two years due to COVID-19.) | | A | QR | | | 0 / 0 | 0–1 |
WTA 1000
| Dubai / Qatar Open (Note: The first Premier 5 event of the year has switched back and forth between the Dubai Tennis Championships and the Qatar Ladies Open since 2009. Dubai was classified as a Premier 5 event from 2009 to 2011 before being succeeded by Doha for the 2012–2014 period. In 2015, Dubai regained its Premier 5 status while Doha was demoted to Premier status. The Premier 5 tournaments were reclassified as WTA 1000 tournaments in 2021.) | A | A | Q1 | A | A | Q1 | A | A | A | 0 / 0 | 0–0 |
| Indian Wells Open | A | A | A | NH | A | Q1 | A | A | A | 0 / 0 | 0–0 |
| Miami Open | A | A | A | NH | A | A | A | A | A | 0 / 0 | 0–0 |
| Madrid Open | A | Q1 | Q2 | NH | A | A | A | A | A | 0 / 0 | 0–0 |
| Italian Open | A | A | A | A | A | A | A | A | A | 0 / 0 | 0–0 |
Career statistics
| | 2017 | 2018 | 2019 | 2020 | 2021 | 2022 | 2023 | 2024 | 2025 | SR | W–L |
| Tournaments | 2 | 2 | 6 | 2 | 10 | 7 | 0 | 2 | 0 | Career total: 29 | |
| Titles | 0 | 0 | 0 | 0 | 0 | 0 | 0 | 0 | 0 | Career total: 0 | |
| Finals | 0 | 0 | 0 | 0 | 0 | 0 | 0 | 0 | 0 | Career total: 0 | |
| Hard win–loss | 0–0 | 0–0 | 0–1 | 1–1 | 1–5 | 0–3 | 0–0 | 0–0 | 0–0 | 0 / 9 | 2–10 |
| Clay win–loss | 0–2 | 2–2 | 2–5 | 2–1 | 3–6 | 2–3 | 0–0 | 2–2 | 0–0 | 0 / 21 | 13–21 |
| Grass win–loss | 0–0 | 0–0 | 0–0 | 0–0 | 0–0 | 1–1 | 0–0 | 0–0 | 0–0 | 0 / 1 | 1–1 |
| Overall win–loss | 0–2 | 2–2 | 2–6 | 3–2 | 4–11 | 3–7 | 0–0 | 2-2 | 0–0 | 0 / 32 | 16–32 |
| Year-end ranking (Note: 2012: WTA ranking-1018, 2013: WTA ranking-663, 2014: WTA ranking-443, 2015: WTA ranking-337, 2016: WTA ranking-242.) | 214 | 141 | 161 | 119 | 132 | 173 | 173 | 260 | 334 | $1,631,763 | |

=== Doubles ===
current through the 2023 season

| Tournament | 2015 | 2016 | 2017 | 2018 | 2019 | 2020 | 2021 | 2022 | 2023 | SR | W–L | Win % |
|---|---|---|---|---|---|---|---|---|---|---|---|---|
Grand Slam tournaments
| Australian Open | A | A | A | A | 3R | 1R | A | 1R | A | 0 / 3 | 2–3 | 40% |
| French Open | A | A | A | QF | 1R | 1R | A | 1R | A | 0 / 4 | 3–4 | 43% |
| Wimbledon | A | A | A | 1R | 1R | NH | A | 1R | A | 0 / 3 | 0–3 | 0% |
| US Open | A | A | A | 1R | A | A | A | 1R | A | 0 / 2 | 0–2 | 0% |
| Win–Loss | 0–0 | 0–0 | 0–0 | 3–3 | 2–3 | 0–2 | 0–0 | 0–4 | 0–0 | 0 / 12 | 5–12 | 29% |
National representation
| Billie Jean King Cup | A | A | A | A | A | QR | | A | QR | 0 / 0 | 0–1 | 0% |
WTA 1000
| Dubai / Qatar Open | A | A | A | A | 2R | A | A | 1R | A | 0 / 2 | 1–2 | 33% |
| Indian Wells Open | A | A | A | A | A | NH | A | A | A | 0 / 0 | 0–0 | – |
| Miami Open | A | A | A | A | A | NH | A | A | A | 0 / 0 | 0–0 | – |
| Madrid Open | A | A | A | A | QF | NH | A | A | A | 0 / 1 | 2–1 | 67% |
| Italian Open | A | A | A | A | A | A | A | A | A | 0 / 0 | 0–0 | – |
| Win–Loss | 0–0 | 0–0 | 0–0 | 0–0 | 3–2 | 0–0 | 0–0 | 0–1 | 0–0 | 0 / 3 | 3–3 | 50% |
Career statistics
| | 2015 | 2016 | 2017 | 2018 | 2019 | 2020 | 2021 | 2022 | 2023 | SR | W–L | Win % |
| Tournaments | 1 | 1 | 1 | 9 | 13 | 4 | 8 | 11 | 1 | Career total: 49 | | |
| Titles | 0 | 0 | 0 | 0 | 0 | 0 | 1 | 0 | 0 | Career total: 1 | | |
| Finals | 0 | 0 | 0 | 0 | 0 | 0 | 1 | 0 | 0 | Career total: 1 | | |
| Overall win–loss | 0–1 | 0–1 | 1–3 | 10–9 | 10–12 | 1–4 | 8–5 | 3–11 | 2–2 | 1 / 49 | 35–48 | 42% |
| Year-end ranking (Note: 2011: WTA ranking-1165, 2012: WTA ranking-564, 2013: WTA ranking-397, 2014: WTA ranking-288.) | 290 | 152 | 132 | 77 | 85 | 106 | 96 | 108 | 120 | | | |

== WTA Tour finals ==
=== Doubles: 2 (1 title, 1 runner-up) ===
| Legend WTA 500 WTA 250 (1–1) | Finals by surface Hard (1–0) Clay (0–1) |

| Result | W–L | Date | Tournament | Tier | Surface | Partner | Opponents | Score |
|---|---|---|---|---|---|---|---|---|
| Win | 1–0 | Oct 2021 | Transylvania Open, Romania | WTA 250 | Hard (i) | (Georgia (country)) Ekaterine Gorgodze | (Serbia) Aleksandra Krunić (Netherlands) Lesley Pattinama Kerkhove | 4–6, 6–1, [11–9] |
| Loss | 1–1 | Mar 2025 | Copa Colsanitas, Colombia | WTA 250 | Clay | (Brazil) Laura Pigossi | (Spain) Cristina Bucșa (Spain) Sara Sorribes Tormo | 7–5, 2–6, [5–10] |

== WTA 125 finals ==
=== Doubles: 8 (5 titles, 3 runner-ups) ===
| Result | W–L | Date | Tournament | Surface | Partner | Opponents | Score |
|---|---|---|---|---|---|---|---|
| Win | 1–0 | Sep 2021 | Karlsruhe Open, Germany | Clay | (Georgia (country)) Ekaterine Gorgodze | (Poland) Katarzyna Piter (Egypt) Mayar Sherif | 6–3, 2–6, [10–7] |
| Win | 2–0 | Nov 2021 | Buenos Aires Open, Argentine | Clay | (Georgia (country)) Ekaterine Gorgodze | (Argentina) María Lourdes Carlé (Greece) Despina Papamichail | 5–7, 7–5, [10–4] |
| Win | 3–0 | Nov 2021 | Montevideo Open, Uruguay | Clay | (Georgia (country)) Ekaterine Gorgodze | (Brazil) Carolina Alves (Spain) Marina Bassols Ribera | 6–4, 6–3 |
| Win | 4–0 | Apr 2022 | Marbella Open, Spain | Clay | (Georgia (country)) Ekaterine Gorgodze | (Germany) Vivian Heisen (Poland) Katarzyna Kawa | 6–4, 3–6, [10–6] |
| Win | 5–0 | Nov 2022 | Buenos Aires Open, Argentine (2) | Clay | (Italy) Sara Errani | (South Korea) Jang Su-jeong (China) You Xiaodi | 6–1, 7–5 |
| Loss | 5–1 | Jul 2023 | Iași Open, Romania | Clay | (Romania) Monica Niculescu | (Slovenia) Veronika Erjavec (Slovenia) Dalila Jakupović | 4–6, 4–6 |
| Loss | 5–2 | Apr 2026 | Open Villa de Madrid, Spain | Clay | (Latvia) Darja Semeņistaja | (Spain) Irene Burillo; Elena Pridankina | 6–4, 3–6, [3–10] |
| Loss | 5–3 | Jun 2026 | Internazionali di Brescia, Italy | Clay | (Switzerland) Naïma Karamoko | (Slovenia) Dalila Jakupović (Slovenia) Nika Radišić | 4–6, 5–7 |

== ITF Circuit finals ==
=== Singles: 29 (11 titles, 18 runner-ups) ===
| Legend W100 tournaments (0–2) W80 tournaments (0–1) W60 tournaments (1–5) W25/35 tournaments (4–4) W10 tournaments (6–6) | Finals by surface Clay (11–18) |

| Result | W–L | Date | Tournament | Tier | Surface | Opponent | Score |
|---|---|---|---|---|---|---|---|
| Win | 1–0 | Jun 2013 | ITF Bucharest, Romania | W10 | Clay | (Romania) Laura Ioana Andrei | 6–4, 6–4 |
| Win | 2–0 | Dec 2013 | ITF Antalya, Turkey | W10 | Clay | (Japan) Hikari Yamamoto | 6–4, 6–1 |
| Loss | 2–1 | Jul 2014 | ITF Galați, Romania | W10 | Clay | (Romania) Patricia Maria Țig | 6–7^{(3)}, 6–3, 2–6 |
| Win | 3–1 | Nov 2014 | ITF Antalya, Turkey | W10 | Clay | (Turkey) Melis Sezer | 6–3, 6–2 |
| Loss | 3–2 | Nov 2014 | ITF Antalya, Turkey | W10 | Clay | (Slovakia) Kristína Schmiedlová | 3–6, 2–6 |
| Win | 4–2 | Apr 2015 | ITF Santa Margherita di Pula, Italy | W10 | Clay | (Italy) Stefania Rubini | 6–1, 7–5 |
| Win | 5–2 | May 2015 | ITF Antalya, Turkey | W10 | Clay | (Bolivia) María Fernanda Álvarez Terán | 6–7^{(3)}, 6–1, 6–0 |
| Loss | 5–3 | Jun 2015 | ITF Galați, Romania | W10 | Clay | (Romania) Diana Buzean | 3–6, 6–4, 3–6 |
| Loss | 5–4 | Sep 2015 | ITF Varna, Bulgaria | W10 | Clay | (Bulgaria) Isabella Shinikova | 6–7^{(2)}, 4–6 |
| Loss | 5–5 | Mar 2016 | ITF Tarragona, Spain | W10 | Clay | (France) Joséphine Boualem | 6–7^{(4)}, 7–6^{(1)}, 2–6 |
| Loss | 5–6 | Mar 2016 | ITF Hammamet, Tunisia | W10 | Clay | (Bulgaria) Isabella Shinikova | 1–6, 6–4, 6–7^{(2)} |
| Win | 6–6 | Apr 2016 | ITF Hammamet, Tunisia | W10 | Clay | (Slovenia) Tamara Zidanšek | 6–3, 6–3 |
| Win | 7–6 | Sep 2016 | ITF Hódmezővásárhely, Hungary | W25 | Clay | (Serbia) Dejana Radanović | 7–5, 6–4 |
| Loss | 7–7 | Apr 2017 | ITF Santa Margherita di Pula, Italy | W25 | Clay | (Italy) Giulia Gatto-Monticone | 6–3, 5–7, 4–6 |
| Win | 8–7 | May 2017 | ITF Båstad, Sweden | W25 | Clay | (Liechtenstein) Kathinka von Deichmann | 7–6^{(6)}, 4–6, 6–2 |
| Win | 9–7 | Nov 2017 | Open de Valencia, Spain | W25 | Clay | (Serbia) Olga Danilović | 5–7, 6–4, 6–0 |
| Loss | 9–8 | Apr 2018 | ITF Indian Harbour Beach, US | W60 | Clay | (United States) Caroline Dolehide | 4–6, 5–7 |
| Loss | 9–9 | Jun 2018 | Hódmezővásárhely Ladies Open, Hungary | W60 | Clay | (Colombia) Mariana Duque Mariño | 6–4, 5–7, 2–6 |
| Loss | 9–10 | Oct 2019 | Kiskút Open, Hungary | W60 | Clay (i) | (Romania) Nicoleta Dascălu | 5–7, 2–6 |
| Loss | 9–11 | Sep 2020 | Open de Cagnes-sur-Mer, France | W80 | Clay | (Spain) Sara Sorribes Tormo | 3–6, 4–6 |
| Loss | 9–12 | May 2021 | Bonita Springs Championship, US | W100 | Clay | (United States) Katie Volynets | 7–6^{(4)}, 6–7^{(2)}, 1–6 |
| Loss | 9–13 | Apr 2023 | Koper Open, Slovenia | W60 | Clay | (Spain) Aliona Bolsova | 6–3, 2–6, 1–4 ret. |
| Win | 10–13 | Apr 2023 | ITF Istanbul, Turkiye | W60 | Clay | (Turkey) Berfu Cengiz | 6–7^{(2)}, 6–4, 6–1 |
| Loss | 10–14 | May 2023 | Bodrum Tennis Cup, Turkiye | W60 | Clay | (Argentina) María Lourdes Carlé | 4–6, 4–6 |
| Win | 11–14 | Oct 2023 | ITF Heraklion, Greece | W25 | Clay | (Romania) Andreea Mitu | 6–2, 6–1 |
| Loss | 11–15 | Oct 2024 | ITF Santa Margherita di Pula, Italy | W35 | Clay | (Italy) Matilde Paoletti | 6–3, 2–6, 2–6 |
| Loss | 11–16 | Oct 2024 | ITF Heraklion, Greece | W35 | Clay | (Ukraine) Oleksandra Oliynykova | 4–6, 1–6 |
| Loss | 11–17 | Feb 2025 | ITF Antalya, Turkiye | W35 | Clay | (Hungary) Amarissa Toth | 3–6, 3–6 |
| Loss | 11–18 | Apr 2025 | Charlottesville Open, US | W100 | Clay | (United States) Iva Jovic | 0–6, 1–6 |

=== Doubles: 56 (36 titles, 20 runner-ups) ===
| Legend W100 tournaments (2–1) W80 tournaments (2–0) W60 tournaments (8–1) W40/50 tournaments (1–2) W25/35 tournaments (8–6) W10 tournaments (15–10) | Finals by surface Hard (2–3) Clay (34–17) |

| Result | W–L | Date | Tournament | Tier | Surface | Partner | Opponents | Score |
|---|---|---|---|---|---|---|---|---|
| Loss | 0–1 | Dec 2012 | ITF Antalya, Turkey | W10 | Clay | (Romania) Ioana Loredana Roșca | (Belgium) Justine De Sutter (United States) Katerina Stewart | 5–7, 4–6 |
| Win | 1–1 | Apr 2013 | ITF Antalya, Turkey | W10 | Hard | (Romania) Diana Buzean | (Brazil) Beatriz Haddad Maia (Portugal) Bárbara Luz | 7–5, 6–1 |
| Loss | 1–2 | Apr 2013 | ITF Antalya, Turkey | W10 | Hard | (Romania) Diana Buzean | (Argentina) Andrea Benítez (Brazil) Carla Forte | 2–6, 4–6 |
| Win | 2–2 | Jul 2013 | ITF Iași, Romania | W10 | Clay | (Romania) Diana Buzean | (Bosnia and Herzegovina) Anita Husarić (Ukraine) Kateryna Sliusar | 6–2, 6–1 |
| Win | 3–2 | Aug 2013 | ITF Arad, Romania | W10 | Clay | (Romania) Diana Buzean | (Romania) Cristina Adamescu (Romania) Ana Bianca Mihăilă | 6–4, 6–3 |
| Win | 4–2 | Aug 2013 | ITF Bucharest, Romania | W10 | Clay | (Romania) Ioana Loredana Roșca | (Romania) Raluca Elena Platon (Romania) Patricia Maria Țig | 6–4, 6–4 |
| Win | 5–2 | Oct 2013 | ITF Ruse, Bulgaria | W10 | Clay | (Netherlands) Eva Wacanno | (North Macedonia) Lina Gjorcheska (Romania) Camelia Hristea | 6–1, 6–2 |
| Win | 6–2 | Dec 2013 | ITF Antalya, Turkey | W10 | Clay | (Switzerland) Conny Perrin | (Romania) Gabriela Talabă (Romania) Patricia Maria Țig | 6–3, 6–1 |
| Loss | 6–3 | Jan 2014 | ITF Antalya, Turkey | W10 | Clay | (Romania) Diana Buzean | (Belarus) Sviatlana Pirazhenka (Ukraine) Alyona Sotnikova | 5–7, 6–1, [7–10] |
| Loss | 6–4 | May 2014 | ITF Bol, Croatia | W10 | Clay | (Romania) Raluca Elena Platon | (Czech Republic) Pernilla Mendesova (Romania) Patricia Maria Țig | w/o |
| Loss | 6–5 | Jul 2014 | Palić Open, Serbia | W10 | Clay | (Romania) Camelia Hristea | (North Macedonia) Lina Gjorcheska (Ukraine) Elizaveta Ianchuk | 4–6, 1–6 |
| Win | 7–5 | Aug 2014 | ITF Arad, Romania | W10 | Clay | (Romania) Diana Buzean | (North Macedonia) Lina Gjorcheska (Romania) Camelia Hristea | 4–6, 7–5, [10–6] |
| Win | 8–5 | Aug 2014 | ITF Mamaia, Romania | W25 | Clay | (Romania) Andreea Mitu | (Romania) Georgia Crăciun (Romania) Patricia Maria Țig | 6–4, 6–1 |
| Win | 9–5 | Sep 2014 | ITF Dobrich, Bulgaria | W25 | Clay | (Romania) Andreea Mitu | (Hungary) Réka Luca Jani (Bulgaria) Isabella Shinikova | 7–5, 7–6 |
| Win | 10–5 | Nov 2014 | ITF Antalya, Turkey | W10 | Clay | (Turkey) Melis Sezer | (Germany) Lisa Ponomar (Russia) Shakhlo Saidova | w/o |
| Loss | 10–6 | Nov 2014 | ITF Antalya, Turkey | W10 | Clay | (Turkey) Melis Sezer | (Italy) Valeria Prosperi (Uzbekistan) Arina Folts | 6–3, 6–7^{(4)}, [5–10] |
| Win | 11–6 | Dec 2014 | ITF Antalya, Turkey | W10 | Clay | (Romania) Diana Buzean | (North Macedonia) Magdalena Stoilkovska (Netherlands) Elke Tiel | 6–2, 6–4 |
| Loss | 11–7 | Feb 2015 | ITF Palmanova, Spain | W10 | Clay | (Hungary) Ágnes Bukta | (United Kingdom) Amanda Carreras (Italy) Alice Savoretti | 4–6, 1–6 |
| Win | 12–7 | Feb 2015 | ITF Palmanova, Spain | W10 | Clay | (Hungary) Ágnes Bukta | (Romania) Ana Bianca Mihăilă (Czech Republic) Gabriela Pantůčková | 6–1, 6–1 |
| Win | 13–7 | Feb 2015 | ITF Palmanova, Spain | W10 | Clay | (Hungary) Ágnes Bukta | (Germany) Kim Grajdek (Lithuania) Akvilė Paražinskaitė | 6–2, 6–4 |
| Loss | 13–8 | Mar 2015 | ITF Santa Margherita di Pula, Italy | W10 | Clay | (Hungary) Lilla Barzó | (Italy) Claudia Giovine (Belgium) Kimberley Zimmermann | 6–7^{(4)}, 3–6 |
| Win | 14–8 | Apr 2015 | ITF Santa Margherita di Pula | W10 | Clay | (Romania) Oana Georgeta Simion | (France) Margot Yerolymos (Belgium) Kimberley Zimmermann | 7–5, 6–4 |
| Win | 15–8 | Apr 2015 | ITF Santa Margherita di Pula | W25 | Clay | (Romania) Mihaela Buzărnescu | (Italy) Corinna Dentoni (Italy) Claudia Giovine | 6–3, 2–6, [10–4] |
| Loss | 15–9 | May 2015 | ITF Antalya, Turkey | W10 | Clay | (Croatia) Tea Faber | (Italy) Francesca Palmigiano (France) Carla Touly | 4–6, 0–6 |
| Loss | 15–10 | Jun 2015 | ITF Galați, Romania | W25 | Clay | (Romania) Diana Buzean | (Romania) Cristina Dinu (North Macedonia) Lina Gjorcheska | 4–6, 2–6 |
| Win | 16–10 | Sep 2015 | ITF Varna, Bulgaria | W10 | Clay | (Bulgaria) Isabella Shinikova | (Argentina) Julieta Lara Estable (Argentina) Ana Victoria Gobbi Monllau | 7–5, 4–6, [10–4] |
| Win | 17–10 | Mar 2016 | ITF Tarragona, Spain | W10 | Clay | (Ukraine) Alyona Sotnikova | (Spain) Georgina García Pérez (Spain) Olga Sáez Larra | 7–5, 3–6, [10–8] |
| Win | 18–10 | Apr 2016 | ITF Hammamet, Tunisia | W10 | Clay | (France) Alice Bacquie | (Algeria) Inès Ibbou (France) Kelia Le Bihan | 6–1, 6–0 |
| Loss | 18–11 | May 2016 | ITF Båstad, Sweden | W10 | Clay | (Norway) Melanie Stokke | (Denmark) Emilie Francati (Sweden) Cornelia Lister | 2–6, 4–6 |
| Loss | 18–12 | Jun 2016 | ITF Hódmezővásárhely, Hungary | W25 | Clay | (North Macedonia) Lina Gjorcheska | (Brazil) Laura Pigossi (Argentina) Nadia Podoroska | 3–6, 0–6 |
| Loss | 18–13 | Jun 2016 | ITF Lenzerheide, Switzerland | W25 | Clay | (Belgium) Elyne Boeykens | (Slovenia) Tadeja Majerič (Bulgaria) Aleksandrina Naydenova | 5–7, 6–1, [8–10] |
| Win | 19–13 | Jul 2016 | Bella Cup Toruń, Poland | W25 | Clay | (Russia) Valeria Savinykh | (Uzbekistan) Akgul Amanmuradova (Russia) Valentina Ivakhnenko | 6–3, 4–6, [10–7] |
| Win | 20–13 | Aug 2016 | ITF Bad Saulgau, Germany | W25 | Clay | (Ukraine) Oleksandra Korashvili | (Germany) Nicola Geuer (Germany) Anna Zaja | 7–5, 4–6, [10–4] |
| Loss | 20–14 | Sep 2016 | ITF Mamaia, Romania | W25 | Clay | (Romania) Mihaela Buzărnescu | (Slovakia) Vivien Juhászová (Czech Republic) Kateřina Kramperová | 6–7^{(3)}, 6–2, [7–10] |
| Loss | 20–15 | Sep 2016 | ITF Hódmezővásárhely, Hungary | W25 | Clay | (Romania) Elena Bogdan | (Switzerland) Conny Perrin (Slovakia) Chantal Škamlová | 4–6, 2–6 |
| Win | 21–15 | Oct 2016 | Soho Square Tournament, Egypt | W100 | Hard | (Ukraine) Alena Fomina | (Argentina) Guadalupe Pérez Rojas (Switzerland) Jil Teichmann | 6–2, 6–1 |
| Loss | 21–16 | Feb 2017 | ITF Perth, Australia | W25 | Hard | (India) Prarthana Thombare | (Japan) Junri Namigata (Japan) Riko Sawayanagi | 6–7^{(5)}, 6–4, [9–11] |
| Win | 22–16 | Apr 2017 | ITF Santa Margherita di Pula, Italy | W25 | Clay | (Croatia) Tereza Mrdeža | (France) Sara Cakarevic (Romania) Nicoleta Dascălu | 6–4, 6–2 |
| Win | 23–16 | May 2017 | ITF Dunakeszi, Hungary | W25 | Clay | (Romania) Mihaela Buzărnescu | (Romania) Daiana Negreanu (Romania) Oana Georgeta Simion | 1–6, 6–1, [10–3] |
| Win | 24–16 | Sep 2017 | Ladies Open Dunakeszi, Hungary | W60 | Clay | (Slovakia) Chantal Škamlová | (Romania) Alexandra Cadanțu (Czech Republic) Tereza Smitková | 7–6^{(7)}, 6–4 |
| Win | 25–16 | Sep 2017 | Open de Biarritz, France | W80 | Clay | (Romania) Mihaela Buzărnescu | (Spain) Cristina Bucșa (Australia) Isabelle Wallace | 6–3, 6–1 |
| Loss | 25–17 | Sep 2017 | Open de Saint-Malo, France | W60 | Clay | (Romania) Mihaela Buzărnescu | (Latvia) Diāna Marcinkēviča (Chile) Daniela Seguel | 3–6, 3–6 |
| Win | 26–17 | Apr 2018 | ITF Indian Harbor Beach, United States | W60 | Clay | (Spain) Sílvia Soler Espinosa | (United States) Jessica Pegula (United States) Maria Sanchez | 6–4, 6–2 |
| Win | 27–17 | Sep 2018 | Open de Biarritz, France (2) | W80 | Clay | (Russia) Valentina Ivakhnenko | (Belgium) Ysaline Bonaventure (Belgium) Helène Scholsen | 6–4, 6–1 |
| Win | 28–17 | Sep 2019 | Open de Valencia, Spain | W60 | Clay | (Spain) Rebeka Masarova | (Venezuela) Andrea Gámiz (Australia) Seone Mendez | 6–4, 7–6^{(2)} |
| Win | 29–17 | Oct 2019 | Kiskút Open, Hungary | W60 | Clay (i) | (Belgium) Maryna Zanevska | (Uzbekistan) Akgul Amanmuradova (Romania) Elena Bogdan | 3–6, 6–2, [10–8] |
| Loss | 29–18 | Apr 2022 | Clay Court Championships, US | W100 | Clay | (Italy) Lucrezia Stefanini | (United States) Sophie Chang (United States) Angela Kulikov | 4–6, 6–3, [8–10] |
| Loss | 29–19 | Mar 2023 | Branik Maribor Open, Slovenia | W40 | Hard (i) | (Romania) Andreea Mitu | (Russia) Sofya Lansere (Russia) Anastasia Tikhonova | 3–6, 2–6 |
| Win | 30–19 | Apr 2023 | Koper Open, Slovenia | W60 | Clay | (Romania) Andreea Mitu | (Netherlands) Suzan Lamens (Australia) Kaylah McPhee | 6–2, 6–3 |
| Win | 31–19 | Sep 2023 | Alpstars Open Vienna, Austria | W60 | Clay | (Poland) Weronika Falkowska | (Austria) Melanie Klaffner (Austria) Sinja Kraus | 6–3, 2–6, [13–11] |
| Win | 32–19 | Nov 2023 | ITF Heraklion, Greece | W40 | Clay | (Slovenia) Dalila Jakupović | (Romania) Oana Gavrilă (Greece) Sapfo Sakellaridi | 3–6, 7–6^{(6)}, [10–8] |
| Win | 33–19 | Mar 2024 | ITF Nagpur, India | W35 | Clay | (Slovenia) Dalila Jakupović | (South Korea) Ku Yeon-woo (Lithuania) Justina Mikulskytė | 6–7^{(8)}, 7–6^{(5)}, [10–7] |
| Win | 34–19 | Jun 2024 | Open de Biarritz, France | W100 | Clay | (Romania) Andreea Mitu | (France) Estelle Cascino (France) Carole Monnet | 6–3, 3–6, [10-7] |
| Loss | 34–20 | Sep 2024 | ITF Slobozia, Romania | W50 | Clay | (Georgia (country)) Ekaterine Gorgodze | (Romania) Briana Szabó (Romania) Patricia Maria Țig | 4–6, 5–7 |
| Win | 35–20 | Mar 2025 | Székesfehérvár Open, Hungary | W75 | Clay (i) | (Georgia (country)) Ekaterine Gorgodze | (Hungary) Luca Udvardy (Hungary) Panna Udvardy | 6–7^{(7)}, 6–3, [10–3] |
| Win | 36–20 | May 2026 | Slovak Open, Slovakia | W75 | Clay | (United Kingdom) Madeleine Brooks | (Poland) Martyna Kubka (Lithuania) Justina Mikulskytė | 7–5, 6–2 |

== Head-to-head record ==
=== Record against top 10 players ===
- She has a 0–3 record against players who were, at the time the match was played, ranked in the top 10.

| Result | W–L | Opponent | Rank | Event | Surface | Round | Score | Rank | H2H |
|---|---|---|---|---|---|---|---|---|---|
2020
| Loss | 0–1 | (United States) Sofia Kenin | No. 6 | French Open | Clay | 3R | 2–6, 0–6 | No. 142 | |
2022
| Loss | 0–2 | (Spain) Paula Badosa | No. 4 | Wimbledon, UK | Grass | 2R | 3–6, 2–6 | No. 122 | |
| Loss | 0–3 | (Estonia) Anett Kontaveit | No. 2 | Hamburg Open, Germany | Clay | 1R | 3–6, 6–7^{(3–7)} | No. 125 | |
