= Open de Biarritz =

ENGIE OPEN Biarritz Pays Basque
- 2024 Engie Open de Biarritz

ITF Women's Tour
- Event name: Biarritz
- Location: Biarritz, France
- Venue: Biarritz Olympique Tennis
- Category: ITF Women's Circuit
- Surface: Clay
- Draw: 32S/32Q/16D
- Prize money: $100,000
- Website: http://www.engie-open-biarritz.fr

The ENGIE OPEN Biarritz (previously known as the Open GDF Suez de Biarritz) is a tournament for professional female tennis players played on outdoor clay courts. The event is classified as a $60,000 ITF Women's Circuit tournament and has been held in Biarritz, France, since 2003 (then a $25,000 category tournament). The 2024 Engie Open de Biarritz was upgraded to a $100,000 tournament.

== Past finals ==
=== Singles ===
Year	Champion	Runner-up	Score
2025	(Egypt) Mayar Sherif	(France) Tiantsoa Sarah Rakotomanga Rajaonah	7–5, 6–4
2024	(Japan) Sara Saito	(France) Margaux Rouvroy	5–7, 6–3, 6–3
2023	(France) Fiona Ferro	(Turkey) İpek Öz	7–5, 6–3
2022	(Germany) Mina Hodzic	(France) Lucie Nguyen Tan	6–3, 6–3
2021	(United Kingdom) Francesca Jones	(Russia) Oksana Selekhmeteva	6–4, 7–6^{(7–4)}
2020	Tournament cancelled due to the COVID-19 pandemic		
2019	(Bulgaria) Viktoriya Tomova	(Montenegro) Danka Kovinić	6–2, 5–7, 7–5
2018	(Germany) Tamara Korpatsch	(Switzerland) Timea Bacsinszky	6–2, 7–5
2017	(Romania) Mihaela Buzărnescu	(Switzerland) Patty Schnyder	6–4, 6–3
2016	(Slovakia) Rebecca Šramková	(Italy) Martina Trevisan	6–3, 4–6, 6–1
2015	(Germany) Laura Siegemund	(Switzerland) Romina Oprandi	7–5, 6–3
2014	(Estonia) Kaia Kanepi	(Brazil) Teliana Pereira	6–2, 6–4
2013	(Liechtenstein) Stephanie Vogt	(Slovakia) Anna Karolína Schmiedlová	1–6, 6–3, 6–2
2012	(Switzerland) Romina Oprandi	(Luxembourg) Mandy Minella	7–5, 7–5
2011	(France) Pauline Parmentier	(Austria) Patricia Mayr-Achleitner	1–6, 6–4, 6–4
2010	(Germany) Julia Görges	(Australia) Sophie Ferguson	6–2, 6–2
2009	(Germany) Julia Görges	(Belarus) Ekaterina Dzehalevich	7–5, 6–0
2008	(Germany) Kathrin Wörle	(Tunisia) Selima Sfar	6–1, 6–3
2007	(France) Pauline Parmentier	(Tunisia) Selima Sfar	6–2, 6–4
2006	(France) Stéphanie Cohen-Aloro	(Romania) Mădălina Gojnea	6–7^{(1–7)}, 6–4, 6–4
2005	(Germany) Martina Müller	(Switzerland) Timea Bacsinszky	4–6, 7–6^{(7–2)}, 6–2
2004	(Morocco) Bahia Mouhtassine	(Spain) Laura Pous Tió	6–4, 7–6^{(7–4)}
2003	(Czech Republic) Zuzana Ondrášková	(Argentina) Natalia Gussoni	6–0, 6–3

=== Doubles ===
Year	Champions	Runners-up	Score
2025	(Spain) Irene Burillo Escorihuela (Mexico) María Portillo Ramírez	(United States) Jessie Aney (Lithuania) Justina Mikulskytė	4–6, 6–1, [10–5]
2024	(Romania) Irina Bara (Romania) Andreea Mitu	(France) Estelle Cascino (France) Carole Monnet	6–3, 3–6, [10–7]
2023	(Poland) Weronika Falkowska (Poland) Katarzyna Kawa	(Switzerland) Conny Perrin (Czech Republic) Anna Sisková	7–6^{(7–2)}, 7–5
2022	(Kazakhstan) Anna Danilina (Ukraine) Valeriya Strakhova	(Argentina) María Carlé; Maria Timofeeva	2–6, 6–3, [14–12]
2021	(Russia) Oksana Selekhmeteva (Latvia) Daniela Vismane	(United Kingdom) Sarah Beth Grey (Belgium) Magali Kempen	6–3, 7–6^{(7–5)}
2020	Tournament cancelled due to the COVID-19 pandemic		
2019	(France) Manon Arcangioli (Belgium) Kimberley Zimmermann	(Mexico) Victoria Rodríguez (Romania) Ioana Loredana Roșca	2–6, 6–3, [10–6]
2018	(Romania) Irina Bara (Russia) Valentyna Ivakhnenko	(Belgium) Ysaline Bonaventure (Belgium) Hélène Scholsen	6–4, 6–1
2017	(Romania) Irina Bara (Romania) Mihaela Buzărnescu	(Spain) Cristina Bucșa (Australia) Isabelle Wallace	6–3, 6–1
2016	(Russia) Irina Khromacheva (Ukraine) Maryna Zanevska	(Sweden) Cornelia Lister (Serbia) Nina Stojanović	4–6, 7–5, [10–8]
2015	(Turkey) Başak Eraydın (Belarus) Lidziya Marozava	(Hungary) Réka-Luca Jani (Liechtenstein) Stephanie Vogt	6–4, 6–4
2014	(Argentina) Florencia Molinero (Liechtenstein) Stephanie Vogt	(Spain) Lourdes Domínguez Lino (Brazil) Teliana Pereira	6–2, 6–2
2013	(Ukraine) Yuliya Beygelzimer (Ukraine) Olga Savchuk	(Russia) Vera Dushevina (Croatia) Ana Vrljić	2–6, 6–4, [10–8]
2012	(France) Séverine Beltrame (France) Laura Thorpe	(Spain) Lara Arruabarrena (Puerto Rico) Monica Puig	6–2, 6–3
2011	(Russia) Alexandra Panova (Poland) Urszula Radwańska	(Japan) Erika Sema (Brazil) Roxane Vaisemberg	6–2, 6–1
2010	(Canada) Sharon Fichman (Germany) Julia Görges	(Spain) Lourdes Domínguez Lino (Romania) Monica Niculescu	7–5, 6–4
2009	(Chinese Taipei) Chan Yung-jan (Russia) Anastasia Rodionova	(Uzbekistan) Akgul Amanmuradova (Belarus) Darya Kustova	3–6, 6–4, [10–7]
2008	(Germany) Martina Müller (Australia) Christina Wheeler	(Argentina) Jorgelina Cravero (Argentina) Betina Jozami	7–6^{(7–5)}, 3–6, [10–8]
2007	(Russia) Evgeniya Rodina (Israel) Yevgenia Savransky	(Russia) Ekaterina Ivanova (Belarus) Iryna Kuryanovich	2–6, 6–1, 6–3
2006	(Russia) Nina Bratchikova (Russia) Yaroslava Shvedova	(Poland) Klaudia Jans (Poland) Alicja Rosolska	6–3, 6–2
2005	(France) Stéphanie Cohen-Aloro (Tunisia) Selima Sfar	(Switzerland) Timea Bacsinszky (France) Aurélie Védy	6–2, 6–1
2004	(Ukraine) Mariya Koryttseva (Ukraine) Elena Tatarkova	(Ukraine) Alona Bondarenko (Ukraine) Valeria Bondarenko	7–5, 6–0
2003	(United Kingdom) Lucie Ahl (Tunisia) Selima Sfar	(Ukraine) Yuliya Beygelzimer (Ukraine) Anna Zaporozhanova	6–1, 6–1
