= 2014 CIT Paraguay Open – Singles =

Singles
- 2014 CIT Paraguay Open

Final
- Champion: (Peru) Bianca Botto
- Runner-up: (Argentina) Florencia Molinero
- Score: 6–3, 6–2

Events
Singles	Doubles
← 2013 ·	CIT Paraguay Open	· 2015 →

The tournament in Asunción was a new addition to the ITF Women's Circuit.

Bianca Botto won the title, defeating Florencia Molinero in the final, 6–3, 6–2.

== Seeds ==
1. (Spain) Lourdes Domínguez Lino (first round)
2. (Paraguay) Verónica Cepede Royg (quarterfinals)
3. (Argentina) María Irigoyen (second round)
4. (Paraguay) Montserrat González (semifinals)
5. (Brazil) Gabriela Cé (second round)
6. (Romania) Patricia Maria Țig (second round)
7. (Argentina) Florencia Molinero (final)
8. (Mexico) Ana Sofía Sánchez (second round)

== Main draw ==
=== Key ===
- Q = Qualifier
- WC = Wild card
- LL = Lucky loser
- Alt = Alternate
- SE = Special exempt
- PR = Protected ranking
- ITF = ITF entry
- JE = Junior exempt
- w/o = Walkover
- r = Retired
- d = Defaulted
- SR = Special ranking

=== Finals ===
Semifinals
(Russia) Anastasia Pivovarova	6	3	4
(Peru) Bianca Botto	4	6	6
4	(Paraguay) Montserrat González	2	1
7	(Argentina) Florencia Molinero	6	6

Final
(Peru) Bianca Botto	6	6
7	(Argentina) Florencia Molinero	3	2

=== Top half ===
First round
1	(Spain) L Domínguez Lino	6	4	4
(Russia) A Pivovarova	3	6	6
(Brazil) L Pigossi	6	6
WC	(Paraguay) C Oest	1	0
Q	(Hungary) C Argyelán	0	1
(Brazil) B Haddad Maia	6	6
(Brazil) N Rossi	2	2
6	(Romania) PM Țig	6	6
3	(Argentina) M Irigoyen	6	6
(Brazil) N Kurata	1	2
Q	(Argentina) S Luini	0	1
(Dominican Republic) F Segarelli	6	6
(Peru) B Botto	7^{8}	7^{7}
(Argentina) C Pella	6^{6}	6^{2}
Q	(United States) L Albanese	2	2
5	(Brazil) G Cé	6	6

Second round
(Russia) A Pivovarova	6	6
(Brazil) L Pigossi	2	2
(Brazil) B Haddad Maia	7	1	6
6	(Romania) PM Țig	5	6	4
3	(Argentina) M Irigoyen	6	5	6^{3}
(Dominican Republic) F Segarelli	3	7	7^{7}
(Peru) B Botto	7^{7}	6
5	(Brazil) G Cé	6^{3}	2

Quarterfinals
(Russia) A Pivovarova	7	6
(Brazil) B Haddad Maia	5	2
(Dominican Republic) F Segarelli	6^{4}	2
(Peru) B Botto	7^{7}	6

Semifinals
(Russia) A Pivovarova	6	3	4
(Peru) B Botto	4	6	6

=== Bottom half ===
First round
8	(Mexico) AS Sánchez	7^{9}	6
(Argentina) V Furlanetto	6^{7}	3
Q	(Brazil) C Alves	6	6
WC	(Paraguay) S Giménez	0	0
(Brazil) E Piai	6	6
WC	(Paraguay) G Ferreira Sanabria	3	2
WC	(Paraguay) AM Stagni Lailla	0	0
4	(Paraguay) M González	6	6
7	(Argentina) F Molinero	7	6
(Italy) G Sanesi	5	0
(Argentina) G Pérez Rojas	4	6	6
(Chile) A Koch Benvenuto	6	3	3
(Argentina) S Blanco	1	3
(Brazil) PC Gonçalves	6	6
(Chile) C Costa Melgar	2	0
2	(Paraguay) V Cepede Royg	6	6

Second round
8	(Mexico) AS Sánchez	3	6	4
Q	(Brazil) C Alves	6	3	6
(Brazil) E Piai	1	1
4	(Paraguay) M González	6	6
7	(Argentina) F Molinero	7^{7}	1	7^{7}
(Argentina) G Pérez Rojas	6^{4}	6	6^{2}
(Brazil) PC Gonçalves	4	1
2	(Paraguay) V Cepede Royg	6	6

Quarterfinals
Q	(Brazil) C Alves	4	2
4	(Paraguay) M González	6	6
7	(Argentina) F Molinero	3	6	6
2	(Paraguay) V Cepede Royg	6	3	0

Semifinals
4	(Paraguay) M González	2	1
7	(Argentina) F Molinero	6	6
