= 2014 CIT Paraguay Open =

- Date: 17–23 November
- Edition: 1st
- Category: ITF Women's Circuit
- Prize money: $50,000
- Surface: Clay
- Location: Asunción, Paraguay
- Venue: Club Internacional de Tenis

Champions

Singles
- (Peru) Bianca Botto

Doubles
- (Argentina) Sofía Luini / (Argentina) Guadalupe Pérez Rojas
| CIT Paraguay Open | · 2015 → |

The 2014 CIT Paraguay Open was a professional tennis tournament played on outdoor clay courts. It was the first edition of the tournament which was part of the 2014 ITF Women's Circuit, offering a total of $50,000 in prize money. It took place in Asunción, Paraguay, on 17–23 November 2014.

== Singles entrants ==
=== Seeds ===
| Country | Player | Rank^{1} | Seed |
|---|---|---|---|
| ESP | Lourdes Domínguez Lino | 112 | 1 |
| PAR | Verónica Cepede Royg | 147 | 2 |
| ARG | María Irigoyen | 172 | 3 |
| PAR | Montserrat González | 222 | 4 |
| BRA | Gabriela Cé | 227 | 5 |
| ROU | Patricia Maria Țig | 249 | 6 |
| ARG | Florencia Molinero | 270 | 7 |
| MEX | Ana Sofía Sánchez | 290 | 8 |

- ^{1} Rankings as of 10 November 2014

=== Other entrants ===
The following players received wildcards into the singles main draw:

- (Paraguay) Gabriela Ferreira Sanabria
- (Paraguay) Sara Giménez
- (Paraguay) Cindy Oest
- (Paraguay) Arianna María Stagni Lailla

The following players received entry from the qualifying draw:

- (United States) Lauren Albanese
- (Brazil) Carolina Alves
- (Hungary) Csilla Argyelán
- (Argentina) Sofía Luini

== Champions ==
=== Singles ===
- (Peru) Bianca Botto def. (Argentina) Florencia Molinero 6–3, 6–2

=== Doubles ===
- (Argentina) Sofía Luini / (Argentina) Guadalupe Pérez Rojas def. (Russia) Anastasia Pivovarova / (Romania) Patricia Maria Țig 6–3, 6–3
