= 2014 CIT Paraguay Open – Doubles =

Doubles
- 2014 CIT Paraguay Open

Final
- Champions: (Argentina) Sofía Luini (Argentina) Guadalupe Pérez Rojas
- Runners-up: (Russia) Anastasia Pivovarova (Romania) Patricia Maria Țig
- Score: 6–3, 6–3

Events
Singles	Doubles
← 2013 ·	CIT Paraguay Open	· 2015 →

The tournament in Asunción was a new addition to the ITF Women's Circuit.

Argentinian-duo Sofía Luini and Guadalupe Pérez Rojas won the title, defeating Anastasia Pivovarova and Patricia Maria Țig in the final, 6–3, 6–3.

== Seeds ==
1. (Argentina) Florencia Molinero / (Brazil) Laura Pigossi (semifinals)
2. (Paraguay) Montserrat González / (Mexico) Ana Sofía Sánchez (semifinals; withdrew)
3. (Argentina) Vanesa Furlanetto / (Argentina) Catalina Pella (first round)
4. (Argentina) María Irigoyen / (Italy) Gaia Sanesi (quarterfinals)

== Draw ==
=== Key ===
- Q = Qualifier
- WC = Wild card
- LL = Lucky loser
- Alt = Alternate
- SE = Special exempt
- PR = Protected ranking
- ITF = ITF entry
- JE = Junior exempt
- w/o = Walkover
- r = Retired
- d = Defaulted
- SR = Special ranking

First round
1	(Argentina) F Molinero (Brazil) L Pigossi	6	6
(Argentina) A Crespo Azconzábal (Paraguay) AP Neffa de los Ríos	2	1
(Chile) C Costa Melgar (Mexico) C Fuentes	7^{9}	5	[10]
(Brazil) F Guimarães Bueno (Brazil) M Guimarães Bueno	6^{7}	7	[8]
4	(Argentina) M Irigoyen (Italy) G Sanesi	6	7^{7}
(Argentina) D Farfán (Paraguay) S Giménez	3	6^{4}
(Russia) A Pivovarova (Romania) PM Țig	6	6
(Paraguay) EA Froch Gauto (United States) K Rizzolo	4	0
(Uruguay) M Mercier (Paraguay) C Oest	1	1
(Argentina) S Luini (Argentina) G Pérez Rojas	6	6
(Brazil) N Kurata (Brazil) E Piai	6^{3}	6	[10]
3	(Argentina) V Furlanetto (Argentina) C Pella	7^{7}	3	[6]
(Brazil) N Rossi (Dominican Republic) F Segarelli	1	4
(United States) L Albanese (Argentina) S Blanco	6	6
(Brazil) C Alves (Paraguay) G Ferreira Sanabria	1	2
2	(Paraguay) M González (Mexico) AS Sánchez	6	6

Quarterfinals
1	(Argentina) F Molinero (Brazil) L Pigossi	6	6
(Chile) C Costa Melgar (Mexico) C Fuentes	4	4
4	(Argentina) M Irigoyen (Italy) G Sanesi	7	1	[5]
(Russia) A Pivovarova (Romania) PM Țig	5	6	[10]
(Argentina) S Luini (Argentina) G Pérez Rojas	6^{4}	6	[10]
(Brazil) N Kurata (Brazil) E Piai	7^{7}	4	[8]
(United States) L Albanese (Argentina) S Blanco	7^{7}	3	[6]
2	(Paraguay) M González (Mexico) AS Sánchez	6^{5}	6	[10]

Semifinals
1	(Argentina) F Molinero (Brazil) L Pigossi	4	3
(Russia) A Pivovarova (Romania) PM Țig	6	6
(Argentina) S Luini (Argentina) G Pérez Rojas	w/o
2	(Paraguay) M González (Mexico) AS Sánchez

Final
(Russia) A Pivovarova (Romania) PM Țig	3	3
(Argentina) S Luini (Argentina) G Pérez Rojas	6	6
