= 2015 Engie Open de Biarritz – Doubles =

Doubles
- 2015 Engie Open de Biarritz

Final
- Champions: (Turkey) Başak Eraydın (Belarus) Lidziya Marozava
- Runners-up: (Hungary) Réka-Luca Jani (Liechtenstein) Stephanie Vogt
- Score: 6–4, 6–4

Events
Singles	Doubles
← 2014 ·	Engie Open de Biarritz	· 2016 →

Florencia Molinero and Stephanie Vogt were the defending champions, but Molinero chose not to participate. Vogt partnered Réka-Luca Jani, but lost in the final to Başak Eraydın and Lidziya Marozava, 6–4, 6–4.

== Seeds ==
1. (Russia) Irina Khromacheva / (Switzerland) Xenia Knoll (first round)
2. (Netherlands) Cindy Burger / (Sweden) Rebecca Peterson (quarterfinals)
3. (France) Pauline Parmentier / (France) Laura Thorpe (first round)
4. (Hungary) Réka-Luca Jani / (Liechtenstein) Stephanie Vogt (final)

== Draw ==
=== Key ===
- Q = Qualifier
- WC = Wild card
- LL = Lucky loser
- Alt = Alternate
- SE = Special exempt
- PR = Protected ranking
- ITF = ITF entry
- JE = Junior exempt
- w/o = Walkover
- r = Retired
- d = Defaulted
- SR = Special ranking

First round
1	(Russia) I Khromacheva (Switzerland) X Knoll	6	0	[7]
(Argentina) T Búa (Spain) G García Pérez	1	6	[10]
(Brazil) T Pereira (Brazil) L Pigossi	6	6
WC	(France) J Suvrijn (France) H Tan	0	2
3	(France) P Parmentier (France) L Thorpe	2	3
(Turkey) B Eraydın (Belarus) L Marozava	6	6
(France) S Foretz (France) C Sibille
(Italy) G Sanesi (Switzerland) J Teichmann	w/o
(France) A Cazeaux (France) J Ponchet	6	6
WC	(France) F Codino (France) T Gravouil	1	2
(Spain) O Parres Azcoitia (Italy) C Rosatello	4	4
4	(Hungary) R-L Jani (Liechtenstein) S Vogt	6	6
(France) M Georges (Spain) C Sánchez Quintanar	1	0
(Slovenia) N Kolar (Sweden) C Lister	6	6
WC	(France) C Maisonnave (France) L Maisonnave	4	2
2	(Netherlands) C Burger (Sweden) R Peterson	6	6

Quarterfinals
(Argentina) T Búa (Spain) G García Pérez	7	6
(Brazil) T Pereira (Brazil) L Pigossi	5	4
(Turkey) B Eraydın (Belarus) L Marozava	7^{7}	4	[10]
(Italy) G Sanesi (Switzerland) J Teichmann	6^{3}	6	[5]
(France) A Cazeaux (France) J Ponchet	0	3
4	(Hungary) R-L Jani (Liechtenstein) S Vogt	6	6
(Slovenia) N Kolar (Sweden) C Lister	6^{7}	6	[10]
2	(Netherlands) C Burger (Sweden) R Peterson	7^{9}	2	[6]

Semifinals
(Argentina) T Búa (Spain) G García Pérez	0	7	[9]
(Turkey) B Eraydın (Belarus) L Marozava	6	5	[11]
4	(Hungary) R-L Jani (Liechtenstein) S Vogt	6	6
(Slovenia) N Kolar (Sweden) C Lister	3	2

Final
(Turkey) B Eraydın (Belarus) L Marozava	6	6
4	(Hungary) R-L Jani (Liechtenstein) S Vogt	4	4
