= 2015 Engie Open de Biarritz – Singles =

Singles
- 2015 Engie Open de Biarritz

Final
- Champion: (Germany) Laura Siegemund
- Runner-up: (Switzerland) Romina Oprandi
- Score: 7–5, 6–3

Events
Singles	Doubles
← 2014 ·	Engie Open de Biarritz	· 2016 →

Kaia Kanepi was the defending champion, but lost in the first round to Amra Sadiković.

Laura Siegemund won the title, defeating Romina Oprandi in the final, 7–5, 6–3.

== Seeds ==
1. (Romania) Alexandra Dulgheru (second round)
2. (Brazil) Teliana Pereira (semifinals)
3. (Estonia) Kaia Kanepi (first round)
4. (Spain) Lourdes Domínguez Lino (second round)
5. (Czech Republic) Klára Koukalová (semifinals)
6. (Germany) Laura Siegemund (champion)
7. (Switzerland) Romina Oprandi (final)
8. (France) Océane Dodin (second round)

== Main draw ==
=== Key ===
- Q = Qualifier
- WC = Wild card
- LL = Lucky loser
- Alt = Alternate
- SE = Special exempt
- PR = Protected ranking
- ITF = ITF entry
- JE = Junior exempt
- w/o = Walkover
- r = Retired
- d = Defaulted
- SR = Special ranking

=== Finals ===
Semifinals
6	(Germany) Laura Siegemund	7	6
5	(Czech Republic) Klára Koukalová	5	4
7	(Switzerland) Romina Oprandi	6	6
2	(Brazil) Teliana Pereira	3	2

Final
6	(Germany) Laura Siegemund	7	6
7	(Switzerland) Romina Oprandi	5	3

=== Top half ===
First round
1	(Romania) A Dulgheru	6	7
(Liechtenstein) S Vogt	2	5
(Ukraine) M Zanevska	6	6
(France) V Razzano	3	3
(Russia) I Khromacheva	6	1
WC	(France) C Sibille	1	0^{r}
WC	(France) J Suvrijn	6^{6}	3
6	(Germany) L Siegemund	7^{8}	6
3	(Estonia) K Kanepi	6	3	6^{4}
Q	(Switzerland) A Sadiković	4	6	7^{7}
(France) M Georges	4	6	5
(Latvia) A Sevastova	6	2	7
(France) P Parmentier	2	6	4
LL	(Spain) O Sáez Larra	6	1	6
Q	(Turkey) B Eraydın	2	4
5	(Czech Republic) K Koukalová	6	6

Second round
1	(Romania) A Dulgheru	3	2
(Ukraine) M Zanevska	6	6
(Russia) I Khromacheva	6	2	3
6	(Germany) L Siegemund	3	6	6
Q	(Switzerland) A Sadiković	0	0^{r}
(Latvia) A Sevastova	6	3
LL	(Spain) O Sáez Larra	2	4
5	(Czech Republic) K Koukalová	6	6

Quarterfinals
(Ukraine) M Zanevska
6	(Germany) L Siegemund	w/o
(Latvia) A Sevastova	1	4
5	(Czech Republic) K Koukalová	6	6

Semifinals
6	(Germany) L Siegemund	7	6
5	(Czech Republic) K Koukalová	5	4

=== Bottom half ===
First round
7	(Switzerland) R Oprandi	3	7^{7}	6
(Sweden) R Peterson	6	6^{4}	1
(Belgium) Y Bonaventure	7	7^{9}
LL	(Italy) G Sanesi	5	6^{7}
(France) S Foretz	6	7^{7}
(Slovenia) N Kolar	3	6^{2}
(Spain) S Soler Espinosa	2	4
4	(Spain) L Domínguez Lino	6	6
8	(France) O Dodin	6	6
WC	(France) H Tan	1	1
(Netherlands) C Burger	6	3	6
Q	(Spain) C Sánchez Quintanar	2	6	3
Q	(Argentina) T Búa	1	4
(Hungary) R-L Jani	6	6
(Russia) N Vikhlyantseva	7^{7}	1	1
2	(Brazil) T Pereira	6^{5}	6	6

Second round
7	(Switzerland) R Oprandi	6	6
(Belgium) Y Bonaventure	2	3
(France) S Foretz	7^{7}	6
4	(Spain) L Domínguez Lino	6^{3}	4
8	(France) O Dodin	7	5	4
(Netherlands) C Burger	5	7	6
(Hungary) R-L Jani	6	4	4
2	(Brazil) T Pereira	3	6	6

Quarterfinals
7	(Switzerland) R Oprandi	6	6
(France) S Foretz	2	1
(Netherlands) C Burger	2	0
2	(Brazil) T Pereira	6	6

Semifinals
7	(Switzerland) R Oprandi	6	6
2	(Brazil) T Pereira	3	2
