= Tennis at the 2013 Bolivarian Games =

Tennis at the 2013 Bolivarian Games took place from 17 to 24 November 2013.

== Medal table ==
Key:

* Host nation (Peru)

Rank	Nation	Gold	Silver	Bronze	Total
1	Chile (CHI)	3	0	0	3
2	Paraguay (PAR)	2	2	0	4
3	Peru (PER)*	1	1	1	3
4	Bolivia (BOL)	1	0	0	1
5	Ecuador (ECU)	0	3	3	6
6	Venezuela (VEN)	0	1	0	1
7	Colombia (COL)	0	0	2	2
8	Guatemala (GUA)	0	0	1	1
Totals (8 entries)		7	7	7	21

== Medalists ==
Event	Gold	Silver	Bronze
Men's singles	Guillermo Matias Nuñez Beltran (CHI)	Gonzalo Escobar (ECU)	Emilio Gómez (ECU)
Men's doubles	Bolivia; Murkel Dellien; Federico Zeballos	Ecuador; Emilio Gabriel Gómez Estrada; Gonzalo Escobar	Peru; Sergio Galdós Leon; Duilio Beretta Avalos
Men's nations cup	Chile; Jorge Aguilar; Nicolás Jarry; Guillermo Matias Nuñez Beltran	Peru; Duilio Beretta Avalos; Mauricio Echazú Puente; Sergio Galdós Leon	Ecuador; Gonzalo Escobar; Emilio Gabriel Gómez Estrada
Women's singles	Montserrat González (PAR)	Verónica Cepede Royg (PAR)	Doménica González (ECU)
Women's doubles	Paraguay; Verónica Cepede Royg; Sara Giménez	Ecuador; Doménica González; Rafaella Baquerizo	Colombia; María Herazo González; María Paulina Pérez
Women's nations cup	Peru; Bianca Botto; Patricia Kú Flores; Katherine Miranda Chang	Paraguay; Verónica Cepede Royg; Sara Giménez; Montserrat González	Colombia; María Herazo González; María Paulina Pérez; Paula Andrea Pérez
Mixed doubles	Chile; Ivania Martinich; Guillermo Matias Nuñez Beltran	Venezuela; Cristofer Daniel Goncalves Jimenez	Guatemala; Kirsten-Andrea Weedon; Christopher Moises Díaz Figueroa
