= 2014 Open GDF Suez de Biarritz =

- Date: 7–13 July
- Edition: 12th
- Category: ITF Women's Circuit
- Prize money: $100,000
- Surface: Clay
- Location: Biarritz, France

Champions

Singles
- (Estonia) Kaia Kanepi

Doubles
- (Argentina) Florencia Molinero / (Liechtenstein) Stephanie Vogt
← 2013 ·	Open GDF Suez de Biarritz	· 2015 →

The 2014 Open GDF Suez de Biarritz is a professional tennis tournament played on outdoor clay courts. It is the twelfth edition of the tournament which is part of the 2014 ITF Women's Circuit, offering a total of $100,000 in prize money. It takes place in Biarritz, France, on 7–13 July 2014.

== Singles main draw entrants ==
=== Seeds ===
Country	Player	Rank^{1}	Seed
EST	Kaia Kanepi	42	1
BRA	Teliana Pereira	88	2
HUN	Tímea Babos	92	3
FRA	Pauline Parmentier	93	4
~~GER~~	~~Anna-Lena Friedsam~~	~~110~~	~~5~~
ESP	Lourdes Domínguez Lino	131	6
LUX	Mandy Minella	136	7
UKR	Anastasiya Vasylyeva	145	8
RUS	Ekaterina Bychkova	157	9

- ^{1} Rankings as of 23 June 2014

=== Other entrants ===
The following players received wildcards into the singles main draw:

- (France) Manon Arcangioli
- (France) Fiona Ferro
- (France) Chloé Paquet
- (France) Jessika Ponchet

The following players received entry from the qualifying draw:

- (France) Audrey Albié
- (Italy) Martina Caregaro
- (Spain) Inés Ferrer Suárez
- (Italy) Gaia Sanesi

The following players received entry by a lucky loser spot:

- (United Kingdom) Amanda Carreras
- (Bulgaria) Viktoriya Tomova

The following players received entry with a protected ranking:

- (Uzbekistan) Akgul Amanmuradova
- (Russia) Evgeniya Rodina
- (Croatia) Ana Savić

== Champions ==
=== Singles ===
- (Estonia) Kaia Kanepi def. (Brazil) Teliana Pereira 6–2, 6–4

=== Doubles ===
- (Argentina) Florencia Molinero / (Liechtenstein) Stephanie Vogt def. (Spain) Lourdes Domínguez Lino / (Brazil) Teliana Pereira 6–2, 6–2
