= CIT Paraguay Open =

Tournament information
- Tour: ITF Women's Circuit
- Location: Asunción, Paraguay
- Venue: Club Internacional de Tenis
- Surface: Clay
- Draw: 32S/32Q/16D
- Prize money: $50,000

The CIT Paraguay Open was a tournament for professional female tennis players played on outdoor clay courts. The event was classified as a $50,000 ITF Women's Circuit tournament and was first and only held in Asunción, Paraguay, in 2014.

== Past finals ==
=== Singles ===
Year	Champion	Runner-up	Score
2014	(Peru) Bianca Botto	(Argentina) Florencia Molinero	6–3, 6–2

=== Doubles ===
Year	Champions	Runners-up	Score
2014	(Argentina) Sofía Luini (Argentina) Guadalupe Pérez Rojas	(Russia) Anastasia Pivovarova (Romania) Patricia Maria Țig	6–3, 6–3
