= 2014 Open GDF Suez de Biarritz – Singles =

Singles
- 2014 Open GDF Suez de Biarritz

Final
- Champion: (Estonia) Kaia Kanepi
- Runner-up: (Brazil) Teliana Pereira
- Score: 6–2, 6–4

Events
Singles	Doubles
← 2013 ·	Open GDF Suez de Biarritz	· 2015 →

Stephanie Vogt was the defending champion, but lost to top seed Kaia Kanepi in the second round.

Top seed Kanepi went on to win the title, defeating Teliana Pereira in the final, 6–2, 6–4.

== Seeds ==
1. (Estonia) Kaia Kanepi (champion)
2. (Brazil) Teliana Pereira (final)
3. (Hungary) Tímea Babos (quarterfinals)
4. (France) Pauline Parmentier (second round)
5. (Germany) ~~Anna-Lena Friedsam~~ (withdrew)
6. (Spain) Lourdes Domínguez Lino (second round)
7. (Luxembourg) Mandy Minella (semifinals)
8. (Ukraine) Anastasiya Vasylyeva (first round)
9. (Russia) Ekaterina Bychkova (first round)

== Main draw ==
=== Key ===
- Q = Qualifier
- WC = Wild card
- LL = Lucky loser
- Alt = Alternate
- SE = Special exempt
- PR = Protected ranking
- ITF = ITF entry
- JE = Junior exempt
- w/o = Walkover
- r = Retired
- d = Defaulted
- SR = Special ranking

=== Finals ===
Semifinals
1	(Estonia) Kaia Kanepi	6	6
7	(Luxembourg) Mandy Minella	2	4
PR	(Russia) Evgeniya Rodina	6	1	4
2	(Brazil) Teliana Pereira	3	6	6

Final
1	(Estonia) Kaia Kanepi	6	6
2	(Brazil) Teliana Pereira	2	4

=== Top half ===
First round
1	(Estonia) K Kanepi	7	6
LL	(Bulgaria) V Tomova	5	3
(Italy) G Gatto-Monticone	3	1
(Liechtenstein) S Vogt	6	6
(India) A Raina	5	2
(France) L Thorpe	7	6
Q	(Spain) I Ferrer Suárez	4	7^{8}	7
8	(Ukraine) A Vasylyeva	6	6^{6}	5
3	(Hungary) T Babos	6	6
WC	(France) C Paquet	3	2
WC	(France) J Ponchet	2	2
(Turkey) P Özgen	6	6
(France) M Johansson	3	4
PR	(Uzbekistan) A Amanmuradova	6	6
LL	(United Kingdom) A Carreras	4	1
7	(Luxembourg) M Minella	6	6

Second round
1	(Estonia) K Kanepi	2	7	6
(Liechtenstein) S Vogt	6	5	3
(France) L Thorpe	6	6
Q	(Spain) I Ferrer Suárez	4	2
3	(Hungary) T Babos	4	6	6
(Turkey) P Özgen	6	4	2
PR	(Uzbekistan) A Amanmuradova	2	6^{1}
7	(Luxembourg) M Minella	6	7^{7}

Quarterfinals
1	(Estonia) K Kanepi	6	6
(France) L Thorpe	0	1
3	(Hungary) T Babos	3	7	0
7	(Luxembourg) M Minella	6	5	6

Semifinals
1	(Estonia) K Kanepi	6	6
7	(Luxembourg) M Minella	2	4

=== Bottom half ===
First round
9	(Russia) E Bychkova	5	2
(Ukraine) L Tsurenko	7	6
WC	(France) M Arcangioli	3	6	4
Q	(Italy) G Sanesi	6	4	6
(Argentina) F Molinero	6	2	1
PR	(Russia) E Rodina	4	6	6
WC	(France) F Ferro	2	5
4	(France) P Parmentier	6	7
6	(Spain) L Domínguez Lino	7^{7}	6
(Russia) M Gasparyan	6^{2}	2
(France) A Hesse	6	6
Q	(France) A Albié	3	2
Q	(Italy) M Caregaro	1	0
(Czech Republic) E Birnerová	6	6
PR	(Croatia) A Savić	6	6^{4}	3
2	(Brazil) T Pereira	3	7^{7}	6

Second round
(Ukraine) L Tsurenko	3	1
Q	(Italy) G Sanesi	6	6
PR	(Russia) E Rodina	6	7
4	(France) P Parmentier	2	5
6	(Spain) L Domínguez Lino	3	6	4
(France) A Hesse	6	3	6
(Czech Republic) E Birnerová	2	1
2	(Brazil) T Pereira	6	6

Quarterfinals
Q	(Italy) G Sanesi	1	1
PR	(Russia) E Rodina	6	6
(France) A Hesse	0	6	1
2	(Brazil) T Pereira	6	4	6

Semifinals
PR	(Russia) E Rodina	6	1	4
2	(Brazil) T Pereira	3	6	6
