= 2015 Engie Open de Biarritz =

- Date: 7–13 September
- Edition: 13th
- Category: ITF Women's Circuit
- Prize money: $100,000
- Surface: Clay
- Location: Biarritz, France

Champions

Singles
- (Germany) Laura Siegemund

Doubles
- (Turkey) Başak Eraydın / (Belarus) Lidziya Marozava
| ← 2014 · | Engie Open de Biarritz | · 2016 → |

The 2015 Engie Open de Biarritz was a professional tennis tournament played on outdoor clay courts. It was the thirteenth edition of the tournament and part of the 2015 ITF Women's Circuit, offering a total of $100,000 in prize money. It took place in Biarritz, France, on 7–13 September 2015.

== Singles main draw entrants ==
=== Seeds ===
| Country | Player | Rank^{1} | Seed |
|---|---|---|---|
| ROU | Alexandra Dulgheru | 52 | 1 |
| BRA | Teliana Pereira | 54 | 2 |
| EST | Kaia Kanepi | 89 | 3 |
| ESP | Lourdes Domínguez Lino | 105 | 4 |
| CZE | Klára Koukalová | 109 | 5 |
| GER | Laura Siegemund | 126 | 6 |
| SUI | Romina Oprandi | 127 | 7 |
| FRA | Océane Dodin | 128 | 8 |

- ^{1} Rankings as of 31 August 2015

=== Other entrants ===
The following players received wildcards into the singles main draw:

- (France) Constance Sibille
- (France) Jade Suvrijn
- (France) Harmony Tan

The following players received entry from the qualifying draw:

- (Argentina) Tatiana Búa
- (Turkey) Başak Eraydın
- (Switzerland) Amra Sadiković
- (Spain) Cristina Sánchez Quintanar

The following players received entry by a lucky loser spot:

- (Spain) Olga Sáez Larra
- (Italy) Gaia Sanesi

== Champions ==
=== Singles ===
- (Germany) Laura Siegemund def. (Switzerland) Romina Oprandi, 7–5, 6–3

=== Doubles ===
- (Turkey) Başak Eraydın / (Belarus) Lidziya Marozava def. (Hungary) Réka-Luca Jani / (Liechtenstein) Stephanie Vogt, 6–4, 6–4
