= Agustina Lepore =

Argentine tennis player

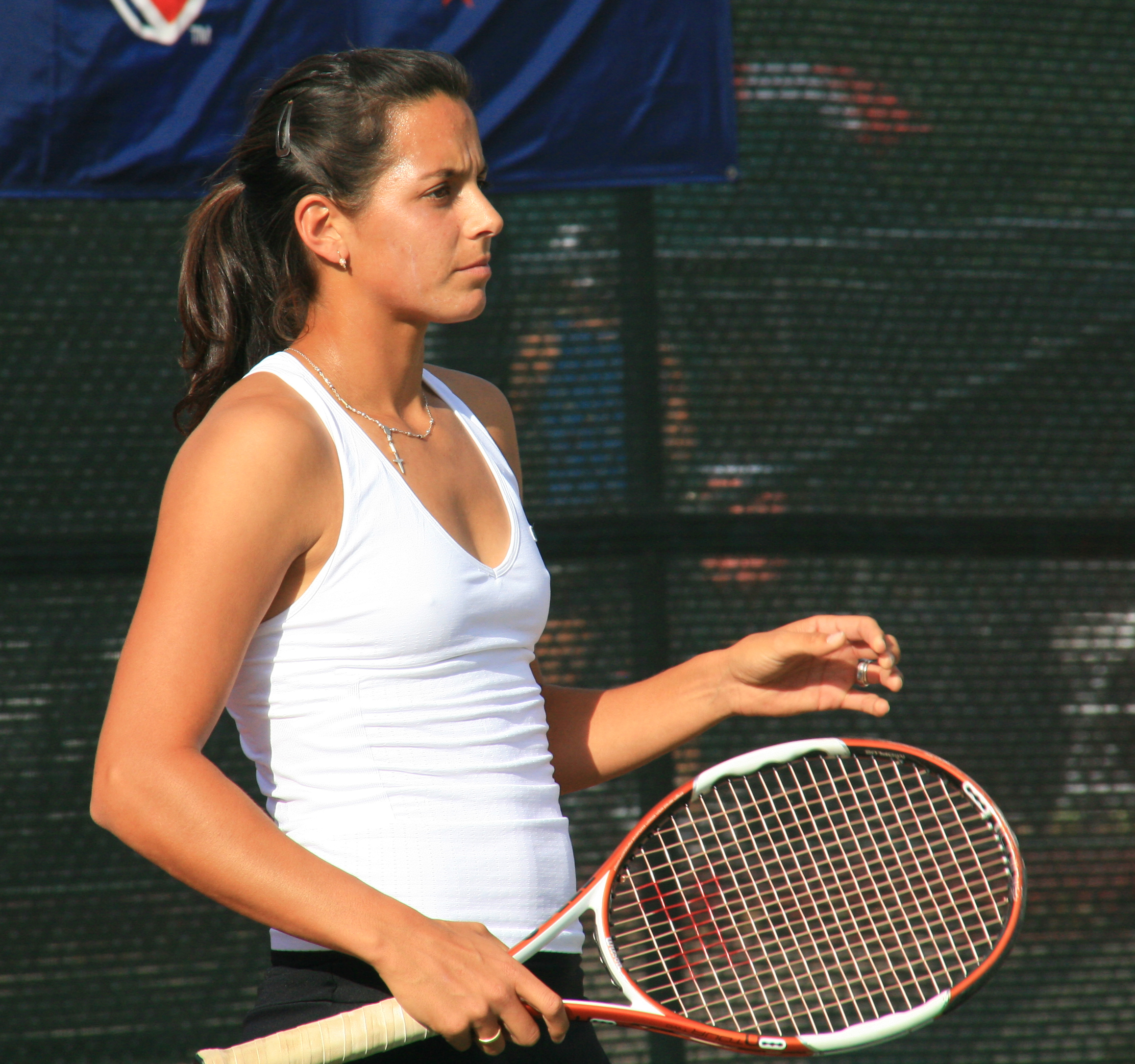
- Lepore in Albuquerque, 2008
- Country (sports): Argentina
- Born: 8 September 1988 (age 37) El Trébol, Argentina
- Turned pro: 2004
- Retired: 2012
- Plays: Right-handed (two-handed backhand)
- Prize money: $63,397

Singles
- Career record: 152-101
- Career titles: 6 ITF
- Highest ranking: No. 227 (13 July 2009)

Doubles
- Career record: 125-76
- Career titles: 10 ITF
- Highest ranking: 239 (7 July 2008)

Agustina Lepore (born 8 September 1988) is a retired Argentine tennis player.

In her career, Lepore won six singles and ten doubles titles on the ITF circuit. On 13 July 2009, she reached her career-high singles ranking of world No. 227. On 7 July 2008, she peaked at No. 239 in the doubles rankings.

Partnering Anikó Kapros, Lepore won her first $50,000 tournament in September 2009 at the Red Rock Pro Open, defeating Kimberly Couts and Lindsay Lee-Waters in the final.

== ITF finals ==
=== Singles: 11 (6–5) ===
Legend $100,000 tournaments $75,000 tournaments $50,000 tournaments $25,000 tournaments $10,000 tournaments	Finals by surface Hard (2–2) Clay (4–3) Grass (0–0) Carpet (0–0)

Result	No.	Date	Tournament	Surface	Opponent	Score
Loss	1.	9 March 2006	Los Mochis, Mexico	Clay	(Colombia) Mariana Duque	2–6, 1–6
Loss	2.	4 June 2006	León, Mexico	Hard	(Argentina) Betina Jozami	3–6, 1–6
Win	1.	5 May 2007	Buenos Aires, Argentina	Clay	(Argentina) Mailen Auroux	7–5, 2–0 ret.
Win	2.	12 May 2007	Córdoba, Argentina	Clay	(Argentina) Florencia Molinero	1–6, 6–0, 6–4
Win	3.	3 September 2007	Barueri, Brazil	Hard	(Argentina) Veronica Spiegel	6–1, 3–6, 7–6^{(7–4)}
Loss	3.	5 November 2007	Córdoba, Argentina	Clay	(Argentina) Soledad Esperón	1–6, 4–6
Win	4.	24 November 2007	Buenos Aires, Argentina	Clay	(Argentina) María Irigoyen	6–3, 4–6, 6–2
Win	5.	28 April 2008	Coatzacoalcos, Mexico	Hard	(Argentina) Soledad Esperón	6–4, 6–4
Loss	4.	27 July 2008	Les Contamines, France	Hard	(Latvia) Anastasija Sevastova	4–6, 6–3, 3–6
Win	6.	22 June 2009	Getxo, Spain	Clay	(Spain) Sílvia Soler Espinosa	6–7^{(3–7)}, 6–4, 6–0
Loss	5.	12 June 2010	Córdoba, Argentina	Clay	(Argentina) Mailen Auroux	3–5 ret.

=== Doubles: 20 (10–10) ===
Legend $100,000 tournaments $75,000 tournaments $50,000 tournaments $25,000 tournaments $10,000 tournaments	Finals by surface Hard (4–3) Clay (6–7) Grass (0–0) Carpet (0–0)

Result	No.	Date	Tournament	Surface	Partner	Opponents	Score
Win	1.	10 October 2005	Tucumán, Argentina	Clay	(Netherlands) Bibiane Weijers	(Argentina) Lucía Jara Lozano (Argentina) Denise Kirbijikian	6–1, 7–5
Win	2.	12 February 2006	Mérida, Mexico	Hard	(Argentina) Betina Jozami	(Mexico) Erika Clarke (Mexico) Daniela Múñoz Gallegos	6–1, 6–2
Loss	1.	9 May 2006	Los Mochis, Mexico	Clay	(Argentina) María Irigoyen	(Colombia) Mariana Duque (Colombia) Viky Núñez Fuentes	5–7, 3–6
Win	3.	20 May 2006	Obregón, Mexico	Clay	(Argentina) María Irigoyen	(Mexico) Erika Clarke (United States) Courtney Nagle	6–2, 6–1
Win	4.	28 May 2006	Monterrey, Mexico	Hard	(Argentina) Betina Jozami	(Canada) Valérie Tétreault (Mexico) Lorena Villalobos Cruz	4–6, 6–1, 6–2
Win	5.	2 October 2006	Tucumán, Argentina	Clay	(Venezuela) Mariana Muci	(Argentina) Flavia Mignola (Argentina) Luciana Sarmenti	6–4, 6–3
Win	6.	9 October 2006	Córdoba, Argentina	Clay	(Argentina) Veronica Spiegel	(Argentina) Tatiana Búa (Brazil) Roxane Vaisemberg	7–5, 6–4
Win	7.	13 November 2006	Florianópolis, Brazil	Clay	(Argentina) Veronica Spiegel	(Colombia) Karen Castiblanco (Argentina) Jesica Orselli	6–4, 7–5
Win	8.	11 May 2007	Córdoba, Argentina	Clay	(Argentina) Soledad Esperón	(Argentina) Florencia Molinero (Argentina) Luciana Sarmenti	6–1, 6–2
Loss	2.	21 May 2007	Córdoba, Argentina	Clay	(Argentina) Soledad Esperón	(Argentina) Andrea Benítez (Argentina) María Irigoyen	4–6, 6–2, 4–6
Loss	3.	23 July 2007	Calgary, Canada	Hard	(Argentina) Soledad Esperón	(United Kingdom) Anna Fitzpatrick (Montenegro) Ana Veselinović	4–6, 3–6
Loss	4.	4 August 2007	Vancouver, Canada	Hard	(Argentina) Soledad Esperón	(Canada) Stéphanie Dubois (Canada) Marie-Ève Pelletier	4–6, 4–6
Loss	5.	5 November 2007	Córdoba, Argentina	Clay	(Argentina) Veronica Spiegel	(Argentina) Andrea Benítez (Argentina) Soledad Esperón	3–6, 3–6
Loss	6.	12 November 2007	Buenos Aires, Argentina	Clay	(Argentina) Veronica Spiegel	(Argentina) Andrea Benítez (Argentina) Soledad Esperón	5–7, 6–7^{(3–7)}
Loss	7.	19 November 2007	Buenos Aires, Argentina	Clay	(Argentina) Veronica Spiegel	(Argentina) Andrea Benítez (Argentina) Soledad Esperón	2–6, 6–0, [3–10]
Win	9.	26 April 2008	Toluca, Mexico	Hard	(Portugal) Frederica Piedade	(United States) Lena Litvak (Canada) Rebecca Marino	6–4, 6–2
Loss	8.	28 April 2008	Coatzacoalcos, Mexico	Hard	(Argentina) María Irigoyen	(United Kingdom) Anna Fitzpatrick (United Kingdom) Anna Hawkins	2–6, 2–6
Loss	9.	22 June 2009	Getxo, Spain	Clay	(Portugal) Frederica Piedade	(Russia) Maria Kondratieva (Russia) Anastasia Poltoratskaya	3–6, 1–6
Win	10.	28 September 2009	Las Vegas, United States	Hard	(Hungary) Anikó Kapros	(United States) Kimberly Couts (United States) Lindsay Lee-Waters	6–2, 7–5
Loss	10.	13 June 2011	Santa Fe, Argentina	Clay	(Argentina) Betina Jozami	(Argentina) Florencia di Biasi (Argentina) Vanesa Furlanetto	6–3, 4–6, 4–6
