= 2014 Open GDF Suez de Biarritz – Doubles =

Doubles
- 2014 Open GDF Suez de Biarritz

Final
- Champions: (Argentina) Florencia Molinero (Liechtenstein) Stephanie Vogt
- Runners-up: (Spain) Lourdes Domínguez Lino (Brazil) Teliana Pereira
- Score: 6–2, 6–2

Events
Singles	Doubles
← 2013 ·	Open GDF Suez de Biarritz	· 2015 →

Yuliya Beygelzimer and Olga Savchuk were the defending champions, however Beygelzimer chose not to participate and Savchuk chose to compete at the 2014 BRD Bucharest Open instead.

Florencia Molinero and Stephanie Vogt won the title, defeating Lourdes Domínguez Lino and Teliana Pereira in the final, 6–2, 6–2.

== Seeds ==
1. (Luxembourg) Mandy Minella / (France) Laura Thorpe (semifinals)
2. (Argentina) Florencia Molinero / (Liechtenstein) Stephanie Vogt (champions)
3. (Spain) Lourdes Domínguez Lino / (Brazil) Teliana Pereira (final)
4. (Argentina) Vanesa Furlanetto / (France) Amandine Hesse (quarterfinals)

== Draw ==
=== Key ===
- Q = Qualifier
- WC = Wild card
- LL = Lucky loser
- Alt = Alternate
- SE = Special exempt
- PR = Protected ranking
- ITF = ITF entry
- JE = Junior exempt
- w/o = Walkover
- r = Retired
- d = Defaulted
- SR = Special ranking

First round
1	(Luxembourg) M Minella (France) L Thorpe	6	6
(Belgium) M Boev (India) A Raina	4	1
(United States) T Noury (France) J Ponchet	1	1
(United Kingdom) N Slater (Australia) K Wlodarczak	6	6
3	(Spain) L Domínguez Lino (Brazil) T Pereira	6	3	[10]
(Ukraine) G Poznikhirenko (Bulgaria) V Tomova	0	6	[8]
(Russia) M Gasparyan (Russia) E Rodina	6	6
(Italy) M Caregaro (Italy) G Gatto-Monticone	2	1
(France) M Arcangioli (France) C Paquet	3	0
(Russia) E Bychkova (Ukraine) L Tsurenko	6	6
(Uzbekistan) A Amanmuradova (Ukraine) A Vasylyeva	4	6	[7]
4	(Argentina) V Furlanetto (France) A Hesse	6	1	[10]
(Russia) O Doroshina (Spain) I Ferrer Suárez	6	6
(Italy) C Coppola (Germany) A Klasen	0	3
(France) C Maisonnave (France) L Maisonnave	3	5
2	(Argentina) F Molinero (Liechtenstein) S Vogt	6	7

Quarterfinals
1	(Luxembourg) M Minella (France) L Thorpe	6	3	[10]
(United Kingdom) N Slater (Australia) K Wlodarczak	3	6	[6]
3	(Spain) L Domínguez Lino (Brazil) T Pereira	6	6
(Russia) M Gasparyan (Russia) E Rodina	2	1
(Russia) E Bychkova (Ukraine) L Tsurenko	6	6
4	(Argentina) V Furlanetto (France) A Hesse	3	2
(Russia) O Doroshina (Spain) I Ferrer Suárez	3	1
2	(Argentina) F Molinero (Liechtenstein) S Vogt	6	6

Semifinals
1	(Luxembourg) M Minella (France) L Thorpe	4	5
3	(Spain) L Domínguez Lino (Brazil) T Pereira	6	7
(Russia) E Bychkova (Ukraine) L Tsurenko	1	4
2	(Argentina) F Molinero (Liechtenstein) S Vogt	6	6

Final
3	(Spain) L Domínguez Lino (Brazil) T Pereira	2	2
2	(Argentina) F Molinero (Liechtenstein) S Vogt	6	6
