= Patricia Maria Țig =

Romanian tennis player

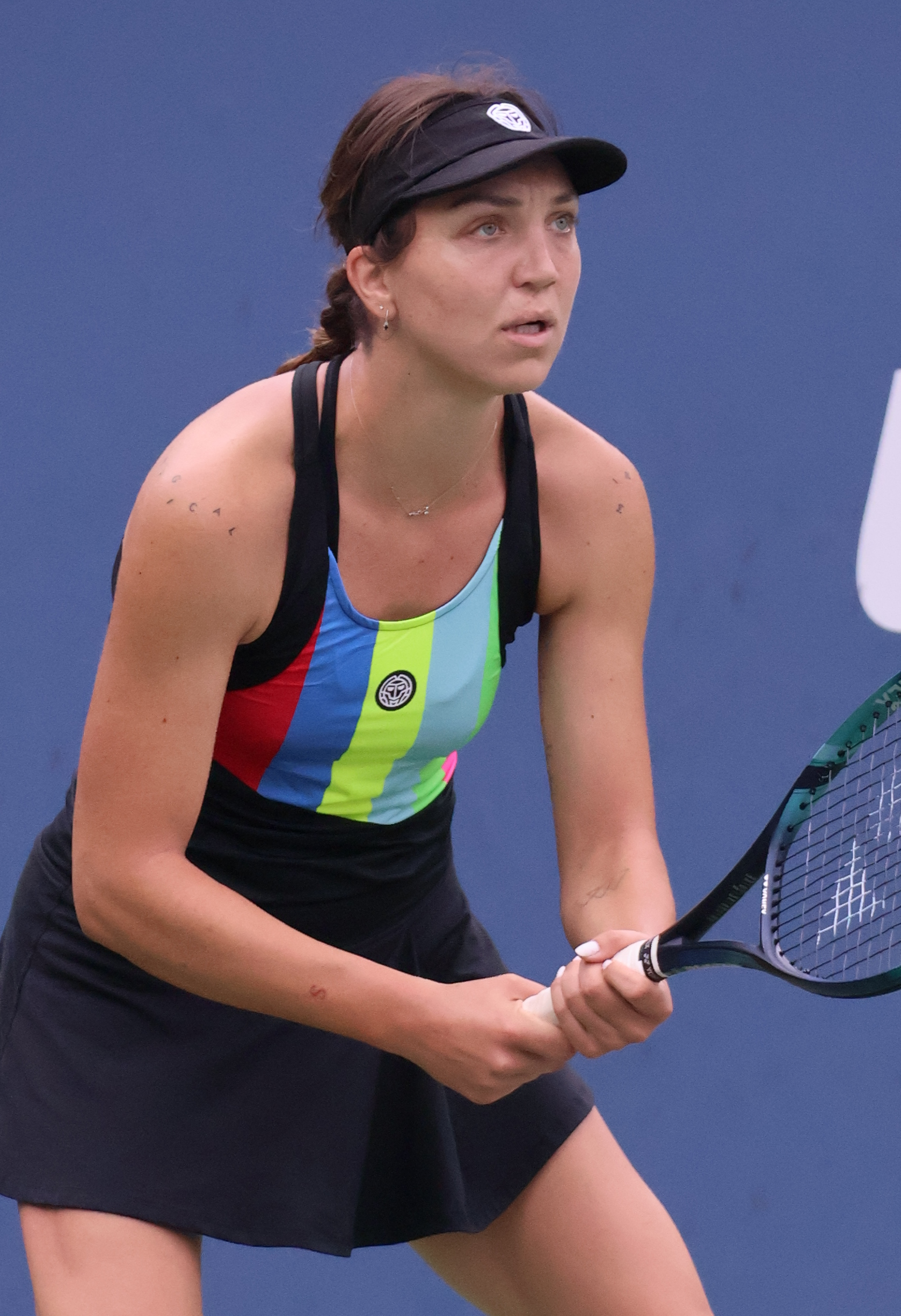
- Țig at the 2023 US Open
- Country (sports): Romania
- Born: 27 July 1994 (age 32) Caransebeş, Romania
- Height: 1.80 m (5 ft 11 in)
- Turned pro: 2009
- Plays: Right (two-handed backhand)
- Prize money: $1,675,087

Singles
- Career record: 400–233
- Career titles: 1 WTA, 1 WTA Challenger
- Highest ranking: No. 56 (26 October 2020)

Grand Slam singles results
- Australian Open: 1R (2017, 2021, 2023)
- French Open: 3R (2020)
- Wimbledon: 1R (2016, 2021)
- US Open: 2R (2020, 2023)

Doubles
- Career record: 128–96
- Career titles: 11 ITF
- Highest ranking: No. 155 (14 November 2016)

Grand Slam doubles results
- Australian Open: 1R (2021)
- French Open: 3R (2020)
- Wimbledon: 1R (2021)
- Last updated on: 17 August 2026.

Patricia Maria Țig (born 27 July 1994) is an inactive Romanian tennis player. Țig has a career-high WTA singles ranking of world No. 56, achieved on 26 October 2020. Her best doubles ranking of No. 155 was achieved on 14 November 2016. Țig has won one singles title on the WTA Tour and one WTA 125 title, as well as twenty-one singles titles and eleven doubles titles on the ITF Circuit.

== Career ==
=== 2015: First WTA Tour finals ===
Țig made her WTA Tour debut at the Bucharest Open where she received a wildcard into the singles main draw, and won against Sílvia Soler Espinosa (retired at 6–4, 3–1) in the first round, before losing 0–6, 2–6 to Polona Hercog. In doubles, paired to co-national Andreea Mitu, Țig reached her first WTA Tour final, but ended runner-up.

She then did much better in Baku by defeating Oksana Kalashnikova 6–1, 6–3 to qualify, and in the main draw qualifiers Olga Ianchuk (6–4, 6–2) and Olga Savchuk (7–5, 6–4), and then Donna Vekić (6–3, 6–2), and in the semifinals top seed and world No. 42, Anastasia Pavlyuchenkova, 6–3, 6–2, thus reaching her first WTA Tour singles final (without losing one set) and entering top 120 in the WTA rankings. She lost the final to Margarita Gasparyan, in three sets.

=== 2017–2018: Break from tour ===
After a period of struggling with her performances in the second half of 2017 season, she decided to focus on her health, citing back pain as the main source of discomfort. Her last played tournament was the (Guangzhou Open) in September 2017. Țig became an inactive player on 24 September 2018, after not playing for 52 consecutive weeks.

=== 2019: Back on the ITF Circuit and to WTA Tour events ===
Țig returned to action in April 2019, after healing her injuries and giving birth to daughter Sofia in November 2018. She played a series of nine $15k tournaments over ten weeks in Cancún, Mexico. She retired or gave her opponent a walkover in three of the first four, as the inactivity led to injuries – including a recurrence of the knee issue. By the fifth tournament, she made the final. She did the same in the seventh, and won the last two.

The Romanian would have preferred to start at the $25k level. But the new pro circuit rules instituted for 2019 made it impossible for her to gain entry with no ranking. She earned no ranking points for those results. "So we went there for nothing. I got, like, 30 points (actually, 37), which means I'm going to be around 500 (in the WTA rankings). So that doesn't get me anywhere", she said in an interview. Țig will find them reinstated in August as the ITF partly rolls back the new circuit rules.

Țig returned to the WTA Tour at the Bucharest Open as a wildcard into qualifying. She won her three rounds of qualifying to make it to the main draw where she defeated Anna Bondár in the first round to advance to the last 16. In the second round, she defeated the top seed and defending champion Anastasija Sevastova, 6–2, 7–5. She went on to defeat Kristýna Plíšková and Laura Siegemund. In the final, she lost to Elena Rybakina. This was the second singles final in her career. She returned to rankings on July 22, at No. 264.

At the Baltic Open, where she used her protected ranking, she defeated Ankita Raina and Anhelina Kalinina, before losing to Anastasia Potapova.

Țig won the Karlsruhe Open, a WTA 125 tournament, defeating Alison Van Uytvanck and advancing back in the top 150, to No. 148. She finished the season in the top 125 at world No. 111 on 4 November 2019.

=== 2020–2022: French Open third round, WTA Tour title & top 60, hiatus ===
After reaching semifinals at the Thailand Open, where she lost to Magda Linette, Țig reentered top 100, reaching world No. 84 on 17 February 2020.

In September 2020, she won her first WTA Tour title at Istanbul. On 26 October 2020, she reached her career-high ranking of world No. 56.

=== 2023–2025: Comeback ===
Țig came back at the 2023 Hobart International and at the 2023 Australian Open, using protected ranking after a year and a half of inactivity on the WTA Tour (since Wimbledon 2021). In June 2023, Țig reached the quarterfinals in Bucharest at an ITF event, then also the quarterfinals in Bacău a month later. In July, Tig entered two WTA 250 tournaments, in Lausanne and Prague, but lost each time in the first round. She also entered the 2023 Transylvania Open with protected ranking. Țig received a wildcard for the doubles competition at the 2025 Transylvania Open, partnering with Briana Szabó.

== Performance timelines ==
Key
W	F	SF	QF	#R	RR	Q#	P#	DNQ	A	Z#	PO	G	S	B	NMS	NTI	P	NH

(W) winner; (F) finalist; (SF) semifinalist; (QF) quarterfinalist; (#R) rounds 4, 3, 2, 1; (RR) round-robin stage; (Q#) qualification round; (P#) preliminary round; (DNQ) did not qualify; (A) absent; (Z#) Davis/Fed Cup Zonal Group (with number indication) or (PO) play-off; (G) gold, (S) silver or (B) bronze Olympic/Paralympic medal; (NMS) not a Masters tournament; (NTI) not a Tier I tournament; (P) postponed; (NH) not held; (SR) strike rate (events won / competed); (W–L) win–loss record.
To avoid confusion and double counting, these charts are updated at the conclusion of a tournament or when the player's participation has ended.

Only main-draw results in WTA Tour, Grand Slam tournaments, Fed Cup/Billie Jean King Cup and Olympic Games are included in win–loss records.

=== Singles ===
Current through the 2025 WTA Tour.

Tournament	2015	2016	2017	2018	2019	2020	2021	2022	2023	2024	2025	SR	W–L	Win
Grand Slam tournaments
Australian Open	Q1	Q1	1R	A	A	Q1	1R	A	1R	A	A	0 / 3	0–3	0%
French Open	Q2	Q1	1R	A	A	3R	1R	A	A	A	Q2	0 / 3	2–3	40%
Wimbledon	Q1	1R	Q1	A	Q1	NH	1R	A	A	A	Q2	0 / 2	0–2	0%
US Open	Q2	1R	Q1	A	Q1	2R	A	A	2R	A	Q1	0 / 3	2–3	40%
Win–loss	0–0	0–2	0–2	0–0	0–0	3–2	0–3	0–0	1–2	0–0	0–0	0 / 11	4–11	27%
WTA 1000
Dubai (Note: The first Premier 5 event of the year has switched back and forth between the Dubai Tennis Championships and the Qatar Total Open since 2009. Dubai was classified as a Premier 5 event from 2009 to 2011 before being succeeded by Doha for the 2012–2014 period. In 2015, Dubai regained its Premier 5 status while Doha was demoted to Premier status. The Premier 5 tournaments were reclassified as WTA 1000 tournaments in 2021.)	A	A	A	A	A	A	1R	A	A	A	A	0 / 1	0–1	0%
Indian Wells Open	A	Q1	1R	A	A	NH	A	A	A	A	A	0 / 1	0–1	0%
Miami Open	A	Q1	3R	A	A	NH	A	A	A	A	A	0 / 1	2–1	0%
Madrid Open	A	QF	A	A	A	NH	A	A	A	A	A	0 / 1	3–1	75%
Italian Open	A	A	A	A	A	A	1R	A	A	A	A	0 / 1	0–1	0%
Canadian Open	A	A	Q2	A	A	NH	A	A	A	A	A	0 / 0	0–0	–
Cincinnati Open	A	A	A	A	A	Q1	A	A	A	A	A	0 / 0	0–0	–
Wuhan Open	1R	A	A	A	A	NH				A	A	0 / 1	0–1	0%
China Open	Q1	A	A	A	A	NH			A	A	A	0 / 0	0–0	–
Career statistics
Tournaments	4	10	10	0	4	6	9	0	2	0	1	Career total: 46		
Titles	0	0	0	0	0	1	0	0	0	0	0	Career total: 1		
Finals	1	0	0	0	1	1	0	0	0	0	0	Career total: 3		
Overall win–loss	5–4	8–10	3–10	0–0	8–4	11–5	3–9	0–0	0–2	0–0	1–1	1 / 45	39–45	46%
Year-end ranking	115	112	175	N/A	111	56	222	796	431	251	348	$1,602,165		

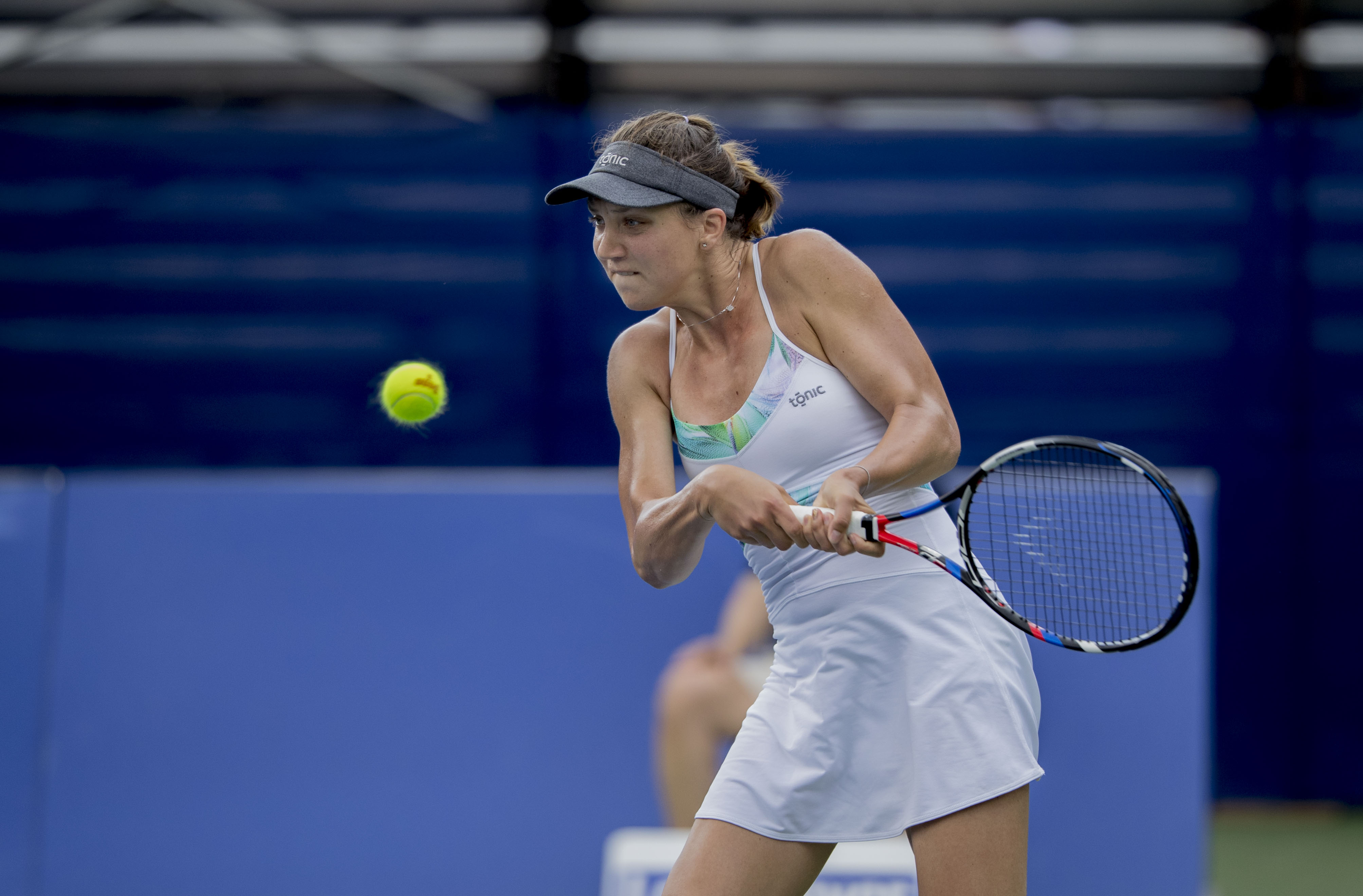
Patricia Țig at the 2017 Washington Open

== WTA Tour finals ==
=== Singles: 3 (1 title, 2 runner-ups) ===
Legend WTA 500 WTA 250 (1–2)	Finals by surface Hard (0–1) Clay (1–1)	Finals by setting Outdoor (1–2)

Result	W–L	Date	Tournament	Tier	Surface	Opponent	Score
Loss	0–1	Aug 2015	Baku Cup, Azerbaijan	International	Hard	(Russia) Margarita Gasparyan	3–6, 7–5, 0–6
Loss	0–2	Jul 2019	Bucharest Open, Romania	International	Clay	(Kazakhstan) Elena Rybakina	2–6, 0–6
Win	1–2	Sep 2020	İstanbul Cup, Turkey	International	Clay	(Canada) Eugenie Bouchard	2–6, 6–1, 7–6^{(7–4)}

=== Doubles: 2 (2 runner-ups) ===
Legend WTA 500 (–) WTA 250 (0–2)	Finals by surface Hard (0–1) Clay (0–1)	Finals by setting Outdoor (0–1) Indoor (0–1)

Result	W–L	Date	Tournament	Tier	Surface	Partner	Opponents	Score
Loss	0–1	Jul 2015	Bucharest Open, Romania	International	Clay	(Romania) Andreea Mitu	(Georgia (country)) Oksana Kalashnikova (Netherlands) Demi Schuurs	2–6, 2–6
Loss	0–2	Oct 2016	Luxembourg Open, Luxembourg	International	Hard (i)	(Romania) Monica Niculescu	(Netherlands) Kiki Bertens (Sweden) Johanna Larsson	6–4, 5–7, [9–11]

== WTA 125 finals ==
=== Singles: 1 (title) ===
Result	W–L	Date	Tournament	Surface	Opponent	Score
Win	1–0	Aug 2019	Karlsruhe Open, Germany	Clay	(Belgium) Alison Van Uytvanck	3–6, 6–1, 6–2

=== Doubles: 1 (runner-up) ===
Result	W–L	Date	Tournament	Surface	Partner	Opponents	Score
Loss	0–1	Apr 2025	Oeiras Ladies Open, Portugal	Clay	(Czech Republic) Anastasia Dețiuc	(Portugal) Francisca Jorge (Portugal) Matilde Jorge	1–6, 2–6

== ITF Circuit finals ==
=== Singles: 35 (21 titles, 14 runner-ups) ===
Legend W100 tournaments W50 tournaments W25/35 tournaments W10/15 tournaments	Finals by surface Hard (4–6) Clay (17–8)

Result	W–L	Date	Tournament	Tier	Surface	Opponent	Score
Loss	0–1	Dec 2011	ITF Antalya, Turkey	W10	Clay	(Ukraine) Viktoriya Kutuzova	6–3, 1–6, 1–6
Win	1–1	Jul 2012	ITF Balș, Romania	W10	Clay	(Romania) Alexandra Damaschin	6–4, 7–5
Win	2–1	Jul 2012	ITF Iași, Romania	W10	Clay	(Romania) Raluca Elena Platon	6–2, 3–6, 6–4
Loss	2–2	Sep 2012	ITF Mamaia, Romania	W25	Clay	(Canada) Sharon Fichman	3–6, 7–6^{(5)}, 3–6
Win	3–2	Nov 2013	ITF Antalya, Turkey	W10	Clay	(Romania) Raluca Elena Platon	6–2, 4–2 ret.
Win	4–2	Nov 2013	ITF Antalya, Turkey	W10	Clay	(Czech Republic) Martina Kubiciková	6–7^{(5)}, 6–2, 6–2
Win	5–2	Dec 2013	ITF Antalya, Turkey	W10	Clay	(Switzerland) Conny Perrin	6–2, 7–5
Win	6–2	Feb 2014	ITF Antalya, Turkey	W10	Clay	(Ukraine) Alyona Sotnikova	5–7, 6–1, 6–3
Win	7–2	Feb 2014	ITF Antalya, Turkey	W10	Clay	(Georgia (country)) Sofia Kvatsabaia	6–3, 6–2
Win	8–2	May 2014	ITF Bol, Croatia	W10	Clay	(Croatia) Tena Lukas	6–2, 7–5
Win	9–2	Jun 2014	ITF Sibiu, Romania	W10	Clay	(Romania) Nicoleta Dascălu	6–2, 6–4
Win	10–2	Jul 2014	ITF Galați, Romania	W10	Clay	(Romania) Irina Bara	7–6^{(3)}, 3–6, 6–2
Win	11–2	Sep 2014	ITF Galați, Romania	W10	Clay	(Ukraine) Elizaveta Ianchuk	6–3, 6–3
Win	12–2	Dec 2014	ITF Mérida, Mexico	W25	Hard	(Brazil) Beatriz Haddad Maia	3–6, 6–3, 6–1
Loss	12–3	Feb 2015	St. Petersburg Trophy, Russia	W50	Hard (i)	(Latvia) Jeļena Ostapenko	6–3, 5–7, 2–6
Loss	12–4	Nov 2016	Shenzhen Longhua Open, China	W100	Hard	(China) Peng Shuai	6–3, 5–7, 4–6
Loss	12–5	May 2019	ITF Cancún, Mexico	W15	Hard	(Mexico) Marcela Zacarías	3–6, 3–6
Loss	12–6	Jun 2019	ITF Cancún, Mexico	W15	Hard	(Brazil) Thaísa Grana Pedretti	4–6, 4–6
Win	13–6	Jun 2019	ITF Cancún, Mexico	W15	Hard	(Mexico) Fernanda Contreras	6–0, 6–0
Win	14–6	Jun 2019	ITF Cancún, Mexico	W15	Hard	(Argentina) Melany Krywoj	6–2, 4–6, 6–3
Loss	14–7	Oct 2019	ITF Seville, Spain	W25	Clay	(Netherlands) Arantxa Rus	4–6, 4–6
Loss	14–8	Jan 2020	Canberra International, Australia (Note: Tournament was moved from Canberra to Bendigo due to the smoke affecting Canberra from the 2019–20 Australian bushfire season.)	W25	Hard	(Poland) Magdalena Fręch	walkover
Loss	14–9	Feb 2020	ITF Nonthaburi, Thailand	W25	Hard	(Romania) Irina Fetecău	3–6, ret.
Win	15–9	Sep 2022	ITF Varna, Bulgaria	W15	Clay	(Croatia) Lucija Ćirić Bagarić	6–1, 6–0
Loss	15–10	Oct 2022	ITF Antalya, Turkey	W15	Clay	(Romania) Anca Todoni	2–6, 6–7^{(4–7)}
Win	16–10	Jun 2024	ITF Focșani, Romania	W15	Clay	(Romania) Bianca Bărbulescu	6–4, 6–4
Loss	16–11	Jun 2024	ITF Bucharest, Romania	W15	Clay	(Romania) Georgia Crăciun	1–6, ret.
Win	17–11	Jul 2024	ITF Galați, Romania	W15	Clay	(Romania) Elena Ruxandra Bertea	6–4, 6–2
Loss	17–12	Jul 2024	ITF Buzău, Romania	W35	Clay	(Spain) Kaitlin Quevedo	6–3, 6–7^{(7)}, 6–7^{(6)}
Win	18–12	Jul 2024	ITF Satu Mare, Romania	W15	Clay	(Romania) Oana Georgeta Simion	6–1, 7–5
Win	19–12	Jul 2024	ITF Brașov, Romania	W15	Clay	(Romania) Georgia Crăciun	6–2, 6–2
Win	20–12	Aug 2024	ITF Bistrița, Romania	W35	Clay	(Ukraine) Oleksandra Oliynykova	6–1, 6–1
Win	21–12	Oct 2024	ITF Istanbul, Turkey	W35	Hard	(Turkey) Ayla Aksu	6-3, 7–6^{(4)}
Loss	21–13	Jul 2025	ITF Buzău, Romania	W35	Clay	(Greece) Despina Papamichail	4–6, 0–1 ret.
Loss	21–14	Jul 2025	ITF Cluj-Napoca, Romania	W15	Clay	(Romania) Ilinca Amariei	5–7, 6–2, 4–6

=== Doubles: 24 (11 titles, 13 runner-ups) ===
Legend W60/75 tournaments W40/50 tournaments W25/35 tournaments W10/15 tournaments	Finals by surface Hard (2–2) Clay (9–11)

Result	W–L	Date	Location	Tier	Surface	Partner	Opponents	Score
Loss	0–1	Jan 2012	Antalya, Turkey	W10	Clay	(Romania) Patricia Chirea	(Russia) Anastasia Frolova (Russia) Eugeniya Pashkova	4–6, 6–7^{(2)}
Loss	0–2	Jun 2012	Arad, Romania	W10	Clay	(Romania) Alexandra Damaschin	(Slovakia) Viktora Malova (North Macedonia) Lina Gjorcheska	walkover
Win	1–2	Jul 2012	Iași, Romania	W10	Clay	(Romania) Alexandra Damaschin	(Czech Republic) Martina Kubicikova (Czech Republic) Tereza Malikova	6–3, 3–6, [11–9]
Loss	1–3	Feb 2013	Sharm El Sheikh, Egypt	W10	Hard	(Romania) Elena-Teodora Cadar	(Italy) Alice Savoretti (Greece) Despina Papamichail	3–6, 4–6
Loss	1–4	Aug 2013	Bucharest, Romania	W10	Clay	(Romania) Raluca Elena Platon	(Romania) Ioana Loredana Roșca (Romania) Irina Bara	4–6, 4–6
Loss	1–5	Dec 2013	Antalya, Turkey	W10	Clay	(Romania) Gabriela Talabă	(Romania) Irina Bara (Switzerland) Conny Perrin	3–6, 1–6
Loss	1–6	Feb 2014	Antalya, Turkey	W10	Hard	(Romania) Gabriela Talabă	(China) Li Yihong (China) Zhu Lin	2–6, ret.
Win	2–6	May 2014	Bol, Croatia	W10	Clay	(Czech Republic) Pernilla Mendesova	(Romania) Raluca Elena Platon (Romania) Irina Bara	walkover
Win	3–6	Jun 2014	Galați, Romania	W10	Clay	(Romania) Camelia Hristea	(Ukraine) Maryna Kolb (Ukraine) Nadiya Kolb	6–3, 6–1
Loss	3–7	Aug 2014	Mamaia, Romania	W25	Clay	(Romania) Georgia Crăciun	(Romania) Irina Bara (Romania) Andreea Mitu	4–6, 1–6
Win	4–7	Oct 2014	Victoria, Mexico	W25	Hard	(Brazil) Maria Fernanda Alves	(Mexico) Carolina Betancourt (Slovakia) Lenka Wienerová	6–1, 6–2
Loss	4–8	Nov 2014	Asunción, Paraguay	W60	Clay	(Russia) Anastasia Pivovarova	(Argentina) Guadalupe Pérez Rojas (Argentina) Sofía Luini	3–6, 3–6
Win	5–8	Sep 2022	Varna, Bulgaria	W15	Clay	(Romania) Maria Toma	(Turkey) Melis Sezer (Bulgaria) Julia Stamatova	6–4, 6–4
Win	6–8	May 2024	Galați, Romania	W15	Clay	(Argentina) Victoria Bosio	(Romania) Alexandra Irina Anghel (Romania) Cristiana Todoni	7–5, 7–5
Loss	6–9	Jun 2024	Focșani, Romania	W15	Clay	(Argentina) Victoria Bosio	(Czech Republic) Kateřina Mandelíková (Romania) Briana Szabó	6–7^{(3)}, 0–6
Loss	6–10	Jun 2024	Bucharest, Romania	W15	Clay	(Romania) Diana Maria Mihail	(Bulgaria) Iva Ivanova (United States) Mia Slama	6–4, 2–6, [4–10]
Loss	6–11	Jul 2024	Buzău, Romania	W35	Clay	(Romania) Briana Szabó	(Finland) Laura Hietaranta (Slovakia) Nina Vargová	3–6, 4–6
Win	7–11	Aug 2024	Bistrita, Romania	W35	Clay	(Romania) Briana Szabó	(Germany) Emily Welker (Romania) Ilinca Amariei	6–3, 6–4
Loss	7–12	Aug 2024	Cluj-Napoca, Romania	W35	Clay	(Romania) Briana Szabó	(Switzerland) Jenny Dürst (Romania) Oana Gavrilă	1–6, 0–6
Win	8–12	Sep 2024	Slobozia, Romania	W50	Clay	(Romania) Briana Szabó	(Romania) Irina Bara (Georgia (country)) Ekaterine Gorgodze	6-4, 7-5
Win	9–12	Oct 2024	Kayseri, Turkiye	W50	Hard	(Romania) Briana Szabó	(Turkey) Melis Sezer (Bulgaria) Isabella Shinikova	3–6, 6–4, [10–8]
Win	10–12	Mar 2025	Antalya, Turkiye	W15	Clay	(Poland) Daria Kuczer	Ekaterina Ovcharenko (United Kingdom) Emily Webley-Smith	6–4, 6–2
Win	11–12	Jun 2025	Bucharest, Romania	W75	Clay	(France) Estelle Cascino	(India) Riya Bhatia (Burundi) Sada Nahimana	4–6, 6–3, [10–6]
Loss	11–13	Jul 2025	Cluj-Napoca, Romania	W15	Clay	(Romania) Lavinia Tănăsie	(Romania) Oana Gavrilă (Czech Republic) Linda Ševčíková	walkover

== Personal life ==
Țig met her future husband Răzvan Sabău when she began coming to his academy for training around 2015. However, as time passed, the two began liking each other and eventually started dating. Born in 1994, Tig is 17 years younger than Sabău. Under his guidance, Tig made tremendous progress despite recurring injuries, which forced her out of the court once for nearly two years in the late 2010s. Tig achieved a career-high WTA singles ranking of No. 56 on 26 October 2020.

They had a daughter named Sofia in November 2018. Tig and Sabău were not married at the time of their daughter’s birth, but they eventually did. The couple ended their relationship in 2021. Although Sabău had initially taken Sofia with him, Tig later won custody of her daughter. Sabău left coaching tennis following this separation from Tig and began living in Cyprus, where he began to play professional poker.
