= Sofía Luini =

Argentine tennis player

- Country (sports): Argentina
- Born: 11 November 1992 (age 33) Buenos Aires, Argentina
- Plays: Right-handed (two-handed backhand)
- Coach: Alejandro Sergio Luini
- Prize money: $48,223

Singles
- Career record: 145–139
- Career titles: 1 ITF
- Highest ranking: No. 492 (22 September 2014)

Doubles
- Career record: 164–123
- Career titles: 10 ITF
- Highest ranking: No. 308 (24 November 2014)

Sofía Luini (Spanish pronunciation: [soˈfi.a ˈlwini]; born 11 November 1992) is an inactive Argentine tennis player.

Luini has won one singles title and ten doubles titles on the ITF Circuit. On 22 September 2014, she reached her best singles ranking of world No. 492. On 24 November 2014, she peaked at No. 308 in the doubles rankings.

Partnering Guadalupe Pérez Rojas, Luini won her first $50k tournament at the Paraguay Open, defeating Anastasia Pivovarova and Patricia Maria Țig in the 2014 final.

== ITF Circuit finals ==
=== Singles: 2 (1 title, 1 runner-up) ===
Legend $25,000 tournaments $10,000 tournaments	Finals by surface Clay (1–1)

Result	W-L	Date	Tournament	Surface	Opponent	Score
Win	1–0	Jun 2014	ITF Villa María, Argentina	Clay	(Argentina) Carla Lucero	6–4, 6–1
Loss	1–1	Sep 2016	ITF Hammamet, Tunisia	Clay	(Belarus) Sviatlana Pirazhenka	1–6, 0–6

=== Doubles: 25 (10 titles, 15 runner-ups) ===
Legend $50,000 tournaments $25,000 tournaments $15,000 tournaments $10,000 tournaments	Finals by surface Hard (1–2) Clay (9–13)

Result	No.	Date	Tier	Tournament	Surface	Partner	Opponents	Score
Runner-up	1.	18 April 2011	10,000	ITF Córdoba, Argentina	Clay	(Argentina) Aranza Salut	(Paraguay) Verónica Cepede Royg (Argentina) Luciana Sarmenti	2–6, 0–6
Runner-up	2.	16 April 2012	10,000	ITF Villa del Dique, Argentina	Clay	(Argentina) Guadalupe Pérez Rojas	(Argentina) Luciana Sarmenti (Chile) Daniela Seguel	4–6, 7–5, [5–10]
Runner-up	3.	10 September 2012	10,000	ITF Buenos Aires, Argentina	Clay	(Argentina) Guadalupe Pérez Rojas	(Chile) Fernanda Brito (Chile) Daniela Seguel	1–6, 3–6
Runner-up	4.	29 October 2012	10,000	ITF Quillota, Chile	Clay	(Argentina) Bárbara Montiel	(Chile) Cecilia Costa Melgar (Chile) Camila Silva	1–6, 1–6
Runner-up	5.	16 September 2013	10,000	ITF Rosario, Argentina	Clay	(Argentina) Guadalupe Pérez Rojas	(Argentina) Vanesa Furlanetto (Argentina) Carolina Zeballos	6–7^{(2)}, 2–6
Runner-up	6.	21 October 2013	10,000	ITF Marcos Juárez, Argentina	Clay	(Argentina) Guadalupe Pérez Rojas	(Argentina) Carla Bruzzesi Avella (Argentina) Carolina Zeballos	2–6, 2–6
Winner	1.	4 November 2013	10,000	ITF Buenos Aires, Argentina	Clay	(Argentina) Catalina Pella	(Chile) Fernanda Brito (Uruguay) Carolina de los Santos	6–4, 6–4
Winner	2.	25 November 2013	10,000	ITF Santiago, Chile	Clay	(Argentina) Ana Madcur	(Argentina) Guadalupe Moreno (Chile) Camila Silva	6–4, 6–7^{(5)}, [10–6]
Runner-up	7.	17 March 2014	10,000	ITF Lima, Peru	Clay	(Argentina) Aranza Salut	(Serbia) Tamara Čurović (Russia) Yana Sizikova	4–6, 5–7
Runner-up	8.	24 March 2014	10,000	ITF Lima, Peru	Clay	(Argentina) Aranza Salut	(Serbia) Tamara Čurović (Russia) Yana Sizikova	2–6, 6–7^{(2)}
Winner	3.	16 June 2014	10,000	ITF Villa María, Argentina	Clay	(Argentina) Ana Madcur	(Brazil) Ingrid Martins (Brazil) Eduarda Piai	6–2, 4–6, [10–7]
Runner-up	9.	28 July 2014	10,000	ITF Santa Cruz, Bolivia	Clay	(Argentina) Guadalupe Pérez Rojas	(Paraguay) Sara Giménez (Bolivia) Noelia Zeballos	7–6^{(3)}, 4–6, [8–10]
Winner	4.	20 October 2014	10,000	ITF Lima, Peru	Clay	(Argentina) Guadalupe Pérez Rojas	(Chile) Cecilia Costa Melgar (Brazil) Nathaly Kurata	6–4, 6–3
Winner	5.	17 November 2014	50,000	Asunción Open, Paraguay	Clay	(Argentina) Guadalupe Pérez Rojas	(Russia) Anastasia Pivovarova (Romania) Patricia Maria Țig	6–3, 6–3
Winner	6.	31 July 2015	10,000	ITF Tunis, Tunisia	Clay	(Bosnia and Herzegovina) Jelena Simić	(Germany) Alina Wessel (Slovakia) Lenka Wienerová	7–6^{(5)}, 3–6, [10–8]
Winner	7.	21 August 2015	10,000	ITF Port El Kantaoui, Tunisia	Hard	(Hungary) Naomi Totka	(Belarus) Darya Chernetsova (Russia) Yana Sizikova	7–5, 1–6, [10–7]
Runner-up	10.	28 August 2015	10,000	ITF Port El Kantaoui, Tunisia	Hard	(Russia) Margarita Lazareva	(Oman) Fatma Al-Nabhani (Slovakia) Michaela Hončová	2–6, 5–7
Runner-up	11.	18 August 2017	15,000	ITF Cuneo, Italy	Hard	(Argentina) Melina Ferrero	(Italy) Federica di Sarra (Italy) Anastasia Grymalska	0–6, 1–6
Runner-up	12.	2 December 2017	15,000	ITF Catanduva, Brazil	Clay	(Argentina) Melina Ferrero	(Brazil) Nathaly Kurata (Brazil) Eduarda Piai	2–6, 3–6
Winner	8.	16 June 2018	15,000	ITF Hammamet, Tunisia	Clay	(Chile) Fernanda Brito	(Spain) Claudia Hoste Ferrer (France) Elixane Lechemia	6–3, 6–2
Runner-up	13.	13 July 2018	15,000	ITF Knokke, Belgium	Clay	(Argentina) Melina Ferrero	(Ukraine) Maryna Chernyshova (Russia) Anna Ukolova	6–1, 1–6, [8–10]
Winner	9.	10 August 2018	15,000	ITF Guayaquil, Ecuador	Clay	(Chile) Fernanda Brito	(Chile) Bárbara Gatica (Brazil) Rebeca Pereira	6–1, 6–0
Winner	10.	17 August 2018	15,000	ITF Guayaquil, Ecuador	Clay	(Chile) Fernanda Brito	(Argentina) Martina Capurro Taborda (Ecuador) Camila Romero	7–6^{(5)}, 6–3
Runner-up	14.	24 August 2019	15,000	ITF Lambare, Paraguay	Clay	(Chile) Fernanda Brito	(Paraguay) Montserrat González (Bolivia) Noelia Zeballos	0–6, 4–6
Runner-up	15.	12 October 2019	15,000	ITF Buenos Aires, Argentina	Clay	(Argentina) Eugenia Ganga	(Argentina) Candela Bugnon (Argentina) Guillermina Naya	6–7^{(4)}, 4–6
