= Guadalupe Pérez Rojas =

Argentine tennis player

- Country (sports): Argentina
- Born: 19 August 1994 (age 31) San Pedro de Jujuy, Argentina
- Plays: Right (two-handed backhand)
- Prize money: $59,446

Singles
- Career record: 161–157
- Career titles: 0
- Highest ranking: No. 410 (18 May 2015)

Doubles
- Career record: 188–126
- Career titles: 13 ITF
- Highest ranking: No. 161 (15 May 2017)

Team competitions
- Fed Cup: 1–2

Guadalupe Pérez Rojas (Latin American Spanish: [ɡwaðaˈlupe ˈpeɾes ˈroxas]; born 19 August 1994) is an Argentine former professional tennis player.

In her career, she won 13 doubles titles on the ITF Women's Circuit. On 18 May 2015, she reached her best singles ranking of world No. 410. On 15 May 2017, she peaked at No. 161 in the WTA doubles rankings.

Partnering Sofía Luini, Pérez Rojas won her first $50k tournament at the Paraguay Open, defeating Anastasia Pivovarova and Patricia Maria Țig in the 2014 final.

Playing for the Argentina Fed Cup team, Pérez Rojas has a win–loss record of 1–2.

== ITF Circuit finals ==
=== Singles: 4 (4 runner-ups) ===
| Legend $10,000 tournaments | Finals by surface Clay (0–4) |

| Result | No. | Date | Tournament | Surface | Opponent | Score |
|---|---|---|---|---|---|---|
| Loss | 1. | 10 August 2013 | ITF Santa Cruz, Bolivia | Clay | (Argentina) Guadalupe Moreno | 0–6, 6–0, 2–6 |
| Loss | 2. | 9 August 2014 | ITF Santa Fe, Argentina | Clay | (Chile) Fernanda Brito | 6–4, 4–6, 4–6 |
| Loss | 3. | 2 May 2015 | ITF Villa del Dique, Argentina | Clay | (Chile) Fernanda Brito | 5–7, 3–6 |
| Loss | 4. | 30 October 2016 | ITF Hammamet, Tunisia | Clay | (Ukraine) Oleksandra Korashvili | 7–5, 2–6, 1–6 |

=== Doubles: 30 (13 titles, 17 runner-ups) ===
| Legend $100,000 tournaments $50/60,000 tournaments $25,000 tournaments $10/15,000 tournaments | Finals by surface Hard (1–2) Clay (12–15) |

| Result | No. | Date | Tier | Tournament | Surface | Partner | Opponents | Score |
|---|---|---|---|---|---|---|---|---|
| Win | 1. | 18 June 2010 | 10,000 | ITF Buenos Aires, Argentina | Clay | (Argentina) Lucía Jara Lozano | (Argentina) Mailen Auroux (Colombia) Karen Castiblanco | 7–6^{(2)}, 1–0 ret. |
| Loss | 1. | 18 November 2011 | 10,000 | ITF Concepción, Chile | Clay | (Argentina) Carla Lucero | (Russia) Alina Mikheeva (Italy) Candelaria Sedano-Acosta | 6–3, 4–6, [3–10] |
| Loss | 2. | 20 April 2012 | 10,000 | ITF Villa del Dique, Argentina | Clay | (Argentina) Sofía Luini | (Argentina) Luciana Sarmenti (Chile) Daniela Seguel | 4–6, 7–5, [5–10] |
| Loss | 3. | 14 September 2012 | 10,000 | ITF Buenos Aires, Argentina | Clay | (Argentina) Sofía Luini | (Chile) Fernanda Brito (Chile) Daniela Seguel | 1–6, 3–6 |
| Win | 2. | 13 October 2012 | 10,000 | ITF São Paulo, Brazil | Clay | (Chile) Fernanda Brito | (Brazil) Flávia Dechandt Araújo (Argentina) Carolina Zeballos | 4–6, 6–2, [10–5] |
| Loss | 4. | 20 September 2013 | 10,000 | ITF Rosario, Argentina | Clay | (Argentina) Sofía Luini | (Argentina) Vanesa Furlanetto (Argentina) Carolina Zeballos | 6–7^{(2)}, 2–6 |
| Loss | 5. | 21 October 2013 | 10,000 | ITF Marcos Juárez, Argentina | Clay | (Argentina) Sofía Luini | (Argentina) Carla Bruzzesi Avella (Argentina) Carolina Zeballos | 2–6, 2–6 |
| Loss | 6. | 1 August 2014 | 10,000 | ITF Santa Cruz, Bolivia | Clay | (Argentina) Sofía Luini | (Paraguay) Sara Giménez (Bolivia) Noelia Zeballos | 7–6^{(3)}, 4–6, [8–10] |
| Win | 3. | 5 September 2014 | 10,000 | ITF Quito, Ecuador | Clay | (Ukraine) Anastasia Kharchenko | (Argentina) Sofía Blanco (Argentina) Ana Madcur | 3–6, 6–4, [10–8] |
| Win | 4. | 24 October 2014 | 10,000 | ITF Lima, Peru | Clay | (Argentina) Sofía Luini | (Chile) Cecilia Costa Melgar (Brazil) Nathaly Kurata | 6–4, 6–3 |
| Win | 5. | 21 November 2014 | 50,000 | Asunción Open, Paraguay | Clay | (Argentina) Sofía Luini | (Russia) Anastasia Pivovarova (Romania) Patricia Maria Țig | 6–3, 6–3 |
| Loss | 7. | 28 March 2015 | 10,000 | ITF São José do Rio Preto, Brazil | Clay | (Argentina) Nadia Podoroska | (Argentina) Ana Victoria Gobbi Monllau (Argentina) Constanza Vega | 3–6, 6–3, [9–11] |
| Win | 6. | 11 April 2015 | 15,000 | ITF Santiago, Chile | Clay | (Argentina) Nadia Podoroska | (Chile) Fernanda Brito (Brazil) Eduarda Piai | 6–4, 6–4 |
| Loss | 8. | 2 August 2015 | 15,000 | ITF Horb, Germany | Clay | (Argentina) Catalina Pella | (Germany) Carolin Daniels (Belarus) Lidziya Marozava | 6–7^{(3)}, 6–4, [7–10] |
| Loss | 9. | 5 March 2016 | 25,000 | ITF Campinas, Brazil | Clay | (Argentina) Nadia Podoroska | (Brazil) Gabriela Cé (Argentina) Florencia Molinero | 6–1, 4–6, [4–10] |
| Loss | 10. | 1 April 2016 | 10,000 | ITF São José dos Campos, Brazil | Clay | (Argentina) Nadia Podoroska | (Paraguay) Camila Giangreco Campiz (Argentina) Constanza Vega | 7–6^{(5)}, 6–7^{(5)}, [8–10] |
| Win | 7. | 30 April 2016 | 10,000 | ITF Győr, Hungary | Clay | (United Kingdom) Francesca Stephenson | (Romania) Daiana Negreanu (Hungary) Rebeka Stolmár | 6–4, 2–6, [10–6] |
| Win | 8. | 20 May 2016 | 10,000 | ITF Galați, Romania | Clay | (Brazil) Maria Fernanda Alves | (Armenia) Ani Amiraghyan (Moldova) Alexandra Perper | 6–4, 2–6, [10–8] |
| Loss | 11. | 27 May 2016 | 10,000 | ITF Galați, Romania | Clay | (Brazil) Maria Fernanda Alves | (Moldova) Alexandra Perper (Moldova) Anastasia Vdovenco | 3–6, 3–6 |
| Loss | 12. | 17 June 2016 | 50,000 | Szeged Open, Hungary | Clay | (Poland) Justyna Jegiołka | (Romania) Cristina Dinu (North Macedonia) Lina Gjorcheska | 6–4, 4–6, [4–10] |
| Loss | 13. | 24 June 2016 | 25,000 | ITF Périgueux, France | Clay | (Argentina) Julieta Estable | (Switzerland) Conny Perrin (Slovakia) Chantal Škamlová | 3–6, 6–3, [7–10] |
| Win | 9. | 24 September 2016 | 10,000 | ITF Sharm El Sheikh, Egypt | Hard | (Romania) Elena-Teodora Cadar | (Romania) Ana Bianca Mihăilă (India) Shweta Chandra Rana | 7–5, 7–6^{(5)} |
| Loss | 14. | 16 October 2016 | 10,000 | ITF Sharm El Sheikh, Egypt | Hard | (Switzerland) Jil Teichmann | (Georgia (country)) Mariam Bolkvadze (Ukraine) Alona Fomina | 2–6, 3–6 |
| Loss | 15. | 23 October 2016 | 100,000 | Soho Square Tournament, Egypt | Hard | (Switzerland) Jil Teichmann | (Romania) Irina Bara (Ukraine) Alona Fomina | 2–6, 1–6 |
| Win | 10. | 5 November 2016 | 10,000 | ITF Hammamet, Tunisia | Clay | (Switzerland) Jil Teichmann | (Serbia) Tamara Čurović (Slovakia) Barbara Kötelesová | 6–1, 4–6, [11–9] |
| Win | 11. | 3 December 2016 | 25,000 | ITF Santiago, Chile | Clay | (Slovenia) Tamara Zidanšek | (United States) Usue Maitane Arconada (Italy) Georgia Brescia | 6–3, 7–6^{(5)} |
| Win | 12. | 29 April 2017 | 60,000 | Nana Trophy, Tunisia | Clay | (Chile) Daniela Seguel | (Hungary) Ágnes Bukta (Slovakia) Vivien Juhászová | 6–7^{(3)}, 6–3, [11–9] |
| Win | 13. | 20 October 2017 | 15,000 | ITF Riba-roja de Túria, Spain | Clay | (Spain) Yvonne Cavallé Reimers | (Spain) Estrella Cabeza Candela (Spain) Ángela Fita Boluda | 6–4, 6–4 |
| Loss | 16. | 2 February 2018 | 15,000 | ITF Hammamet, Tunisia | Clay | (Venezuela) Andrea Gámiz | (Serbia) Natalija Kostić (Bosnia and Herzegovina) Jelena Simić | w/o |
| Loss | 17. | 2 March 2018 | 15,000 | ITF Hammamet, Tunisia | Clay | (Argentina) Guillermina Naya | (Italy) Anastasia Grymalska (Italy) Michele Alexandra Zmău | 2–6, 3–6 |
