= Bianca Botto =

Peruvian tennis player

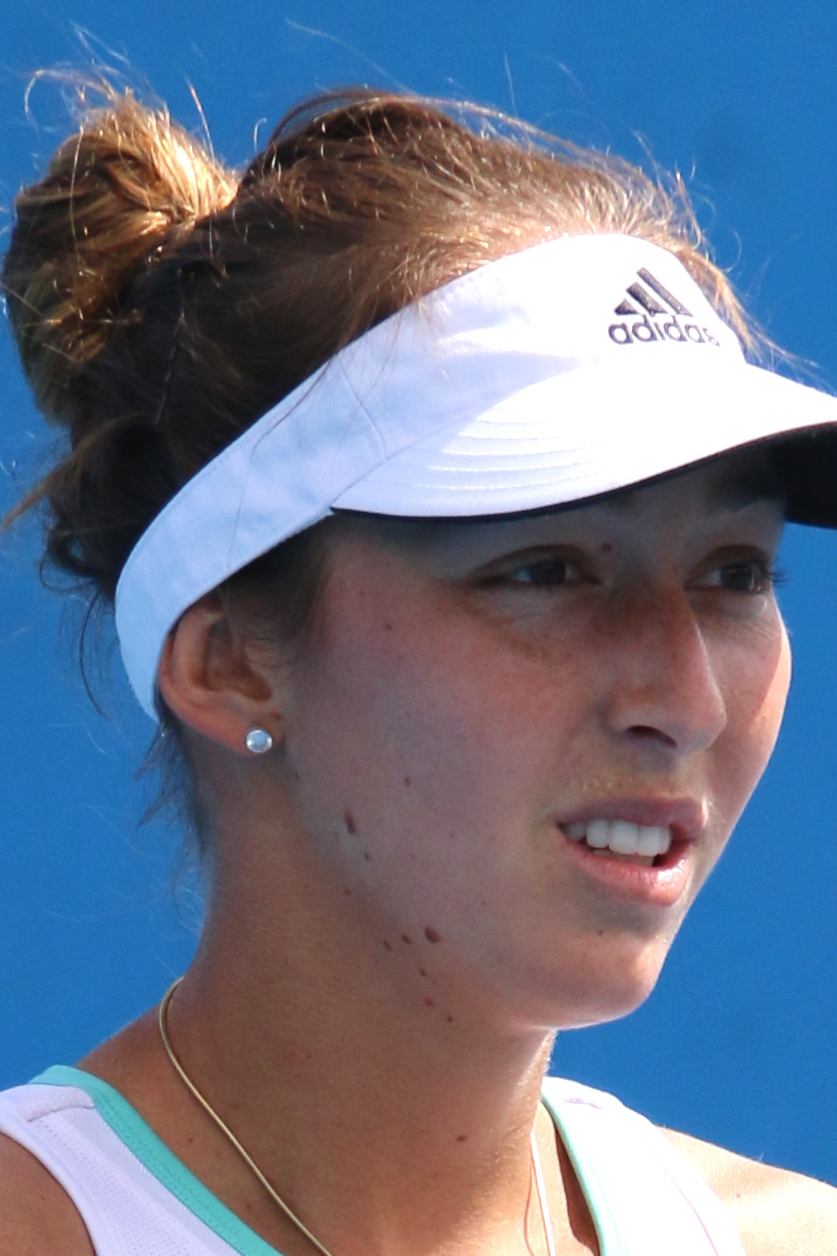
- Country (sports): Peru
- Born: 6 June 1991 (age 34) Lima
- Height: 1.78 m (5 ft 10 in)
- Turned pro: 2007
- Plays: Left (two-handed backhand)
- Prize money: $106,670

Singles
- Career record: 208–97
- Career titles: 15 ITF
- Highest ranking: No. 199 (20 April 2015)

Grand Slam singles results
- Australian Open: Q1 (2015)
- French Open: Q1 (2015)
- US Open: Q1 (2012)

Doubles
- Career record: 55–53
- Career titles: 5 ITF
- Highest ranking: No. 237 (4 October 2010)

Team competitions
- Fed Cup: 28–12
Medal record
Representing Peru
Women's Tennis
South American Games
Bronze medal – third place	2014 Santiago	Singles

Bianca Botto-Arias (born 6 June 1991) is a Peruvian former tennis player.

In her career, Botto won fifteen singles and five doubles titles on the ITF Circuit. On 20 April 2015, she achieved her career-high WTA singles ranking of No. 199. Her career-high in doubles is world No. 237, reached on 4 October 2010.

== ITF Circuit finals ==
$50,000 tournaments
$25,000 tournaments
$10,000 tournaments

=== Singles: 22 (15 titles, 7 runner-ups) ===
Result	No.	Date	Tournament	Surface	Opponent	Score
Loss	1.	28 September 2008	ITF Serra Negra, Brazil	Clay	(Argentina) Aranza Salut	4–6, 4–6
Win	1.	19 October 2008	ITF Lima, Peru	Clay	(Colombia) Karen Castiblanco	6–1, 6–3
Win	2.	2 November 2008	ITF Lima, Peru	Clay	(Russia) Julia Samuseva	6–1, 6–2
Loss	2.	29 November 2008	ITF Buenos Aires, Argentina	Clay	(Argentina) Vanesa Furlanetto	1–3 ret.
Win	3.	29 March 2009	ITF Lima, Peru	Clay	(Italy) Valentine Confalonieri	6–4, 6–2
Win	4.	5 April 2009	ITF Lima, Peru	Clay	(Argentina) Veronica Spiegel	6–3, 7–6^{(3)}
Loss	3.	21 June 2009	ITF Alkmaar, Netherlands	Clay	(Netherlands) Richèl Hogenkamp	6–7^{(5)}, 3–6
Win	5.	9 May 2010	ITF Rio de Janeiro, Brazil	Clay	(France) Olivia Sanchez	6–2, 1–6, 6–4
Loss	4.	16 May 2010	ITF Rio de Janeiro	Clay	(France) Olivia Sanchez	4–6, 3–6
Win	6.	11 September 2011	ITF Casale Monferrato, Italy	Clay	(Italy) Erika Zanchetta	6–2, 6–1
Win	7.	18 September 2011	ITF Mont-de-Marsan, France	Clay	(France) Laura Thorpe	6–2, 6–4
Loss	5.	20 November 2011	ITF Vinaròs, Spain	Clay	(Italy) Anastasia Grymalska	w/o
Loss	6.	12 February 2012	ITF Bertioga, Brazil	Hard	(Brazil) Roxane Vaisemberg	1–6, 1–6
Win	8.	19 May 2012	ITF Caserta, Italy	Clay	(Serbia) Aleksandra Krunić	6–1, 6–0
Win	9.	3 August 2013	ITF São Paulo, Brazil	Clay	(Brazil) Gabriela Cé	7–6^{(7)}, 5–7, 6–2
Win	10.	5 October 2013	ITF Asunción, Paraguay	Clay	(Argentina) Carolina Zeballos	6–7^{(6)}, 6–2, 6–2
Loss	7.	1 June 2014	ITF Bol, Croatia	Clay	(Argentina) Nadia Podoroska	1–6, 7–6^{(6)}, 1–6
Win	11.	8 June 2014	ITF Bol, Croatia	Clay	(Croatia) Tena Lukas	6–1, 6–2
Win	12.	18 October 2014	ITF Lima, Peru	Clay	(Paraguay) Camila Giangreco Campiz	6–3, 6–4
Win	13.	25 October 2014	ITF Lima, Peru	Clay	(Argentina) Constanza Vega	6–3, 6–1
Win	14.	22 November 2014	Asunción Open, Paraguay	Clay	(Argentina) Florencia Molinero	6–3, 6–2
Win	15.	6 December 2014	ITF Santiago, Chile	Clay	(Argentina) Florencia Molinero	3–6, 7–5, 6–1

=== Doubles: 6 (5 titles, 1 runner-up) ===
Result	No.	Date	Tournament	Surface	Partner	Opponents	Score
Win	1.	1 November 2008	ITF Lima, Peru	Clay	(Colombia) Karen Castiblanco	(Argentina) Vanesa Furlanetto (Chile) Andrea Koch Benvenuto	6–1, 6–3
Loss	1.	4 April 2009	ITF Lima, Peru	Clay	(Brazil) Natalia Guitler	(Argentina) Carla Beltrami (Argentina) María Irigoyen	6–4, 3–6, [5–10]
Win	2.	21 June 2009	ITF Alkmaar, Netherlands	Clay	(France) Cindy Chala	(Netherlands) Richèl Hogenkamp (Netherlands) Nicolette van Uitert	7–6^{(4)}, 3–6, [10–2]
Win	3.	8 May 2010	ITF Rio de Janeiro, Brazil	Clay	(United Kingdom) Amanda Carreras	(Bolivia) María Fernanda Álvarez Terán (Slovenia) Andreja Klepač	3–6, 6–4, [10–8]
Win	4.	13 April 2012	ITF Pomezia, Italy	Clay	(Brazil) Teliana Pereira	(Italy) Benedetta Davato (Germany) Anne Schäfer	7–6^{(3)}, 6–2
Win	5.	30 May 2014	ITF Bol, Croatia	Clay	(Finland) Emma Laine	(Czech Republic) Lenka Kunčíková (Czech Republic) Karolína Stuchlá	6–3, 6–3
