= Sara Giménez =

Paraguayan tennis player

- Country (sports): Paraguay
- Born: 4 September 1996 (age 30) Asunción, Paraguay
- Plays: Right-handed
- Prize money: $13,666

Singles
- Highest ranking: No. 719 (11 May 2015)

Doubles
- Career titles: 2 ITF
- Highest ranking: No. 510 (2 Dec 2013)
Medal record
Bolivarian Games
Gold medal – first place	2013 Trujillo	Women's doubles
Silver medal – second place	2013 Trujillo	Women's team

Sara Giménez (born 4 September 1996) is a Paraguayan former professional tennis player.

== Life and career ==
Born in Asunción, Giménez was a women's doubles gold medalist at the 2013 Bolivarian Games (with Verónica Cepede Royg) and also represented Paraguay at the 2014 South American Games.

In 2015 she made a solitary Fed Cup appearance for Paraguay in a doubles rubber against Venezuela, which she and partner Camila Giangreco Campiz won in straight sets.

Competing on the professional tour until 2017, she attained a career high singles world ranking of 719 during her career, while in doubles she had a best ranking of 510 and won two ITF titles.

== ITF finals ==
=== Doubles: 5 (2–3) ===
Outcome	No.	Date	Tournament	Surface	Partner	Opponents	Score
Winner	1.	May 2013	ITF Villa Allende, Argentina	Clay	(Paraguay) Montserrat González	(Argentina) Victoria Bosio (Argentina) Aranza Salut	6–4, 6–0
Runner-up	1.	Aug 2013	ITF La Paz, Bolivia	Clay	(Argentina) Stephanie Petit	(Argentina) Guadalupe Moreno (Argentina) Francesca Rescaldani	2–6, 2–6
Runner-up	2.	Sep 2013	ITF Lambaré, Paraguay	Clay	(Paraguay) Montserrat González	(Argentina) Carla Bruzzesi Avella (Argentina) Carolina Zeballos	2–6, 5–7
Winner	2.	Aug 2014	ITF Santa Cruz, Bolivia	Clay	(Bolivia) Noelia Zeballos	(Argentina) Sofía Luini (Argentina) Guadalupe Pérez Rojas	6–7^{(3)}, 6–4, [10–8]
Runner-up	3.	Sep 2015	ITF Antalya, Turkey	Hard	(Sweden) Fanny Östlund	(Sweden) Jacqueline Cabaj Awad (Sweden) Kajsa Rinaldo Persson	3–6, 4–6
