= Anastasia Pivovarova =

Russian tennis player

Anastasia Pivovarova Анастасия Пивоварова
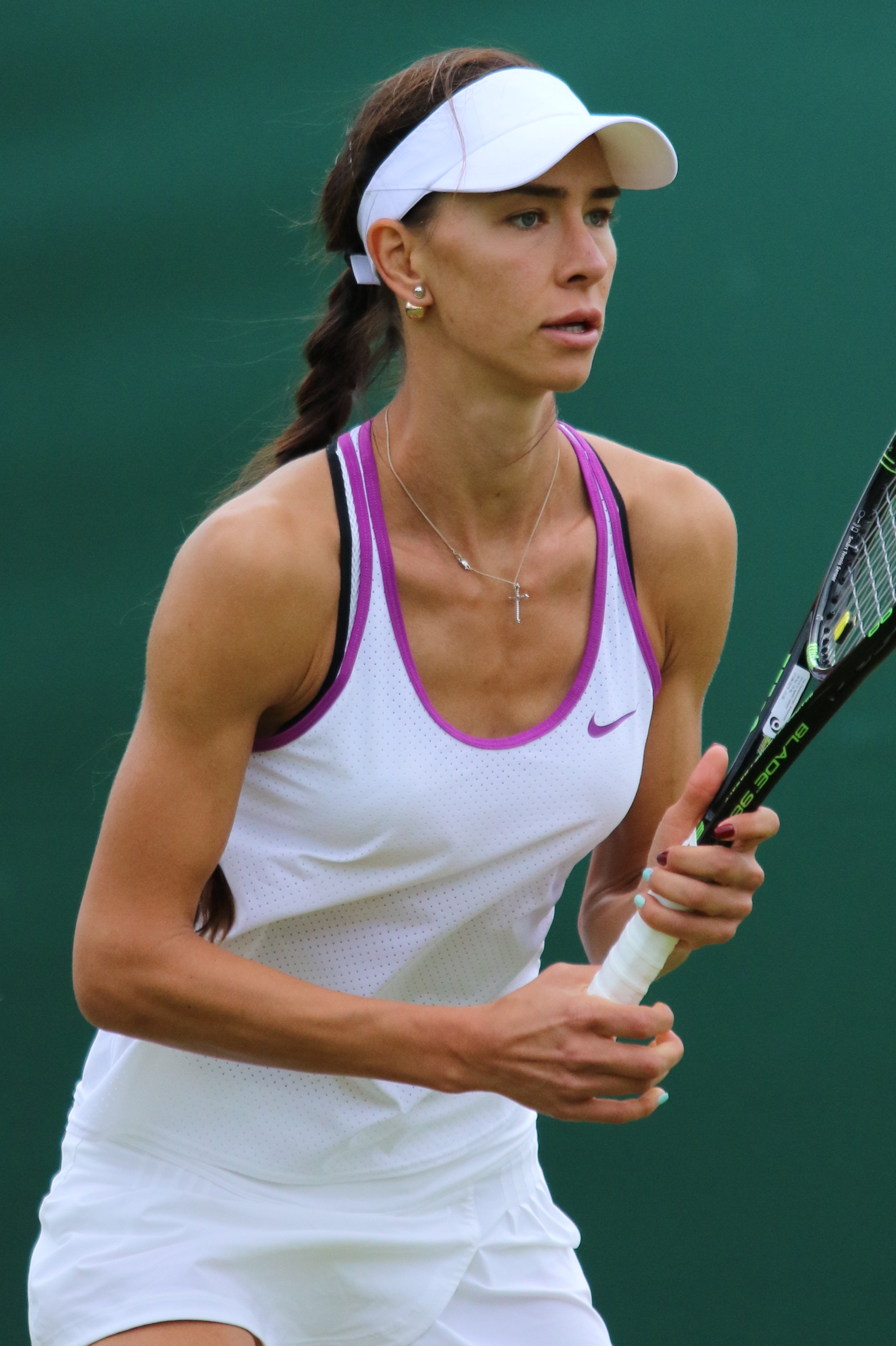
- During 2016 Wimbledon qualifying
- Country (sports): Russia
- Born: 16 June 1990 (age 36) Chita, Zabaykalsky Krai, Russian SFSR, Soviet Union
- Height: 1.81 m (5 ft 11 in)
- Turned pro: July 2007
- Retired: 2012 (comeback 2014–18)
- Plays: Right (two-handed backhand)
- Prize money: $448,256

Singles
- Career record: 287–187
- Career titles: 10 ITF
- Highest ranking: No. 93 (23 May 2011)

Grand Slam singles results
- Australian Open: Q3 (2010, 2011)
- French Open: 3R (2010)
- Wimbledon: 1R (2010, 2011)
- US Open: 1R (2008)

Doubles
- Career record: 110–77
- Career titles: 7 ITF
- Highest ranking: No. 169 (19 July 2010)

Anastasia Olegovna Pivovarova (Russian: Анастасия Олеговна Пивоварова, born 16 June 1990) is a former professional tennis player from Russia. She reached a career-high ranking of 93, in May 2011.

During a successful junior career, she was ranked as high as world No. 2.

== Career ==
Pivovarova 2005 began her professional competing on the ITF Women's Circuit. In only her second tournament, she won the first singles title. In Moscow, she overcame in the final Olga Panova, in straight sets. In 2007, she won three singles titles and one doubles title on the circuit. At the 2008 French Open, she tried to qualify for the first time for the main draw of a Grand Slam tournament, failing to do so. At the US Open, she qualified but then lost against Patty Schnyder, in three sets. In Seoul, she managed her first victory in the main draw of a WTA Tour tournament.

Pivovarova retired in 2012, due to an injury, started to work in the President Administration of Russian Federation right after and opened a tennis club called APcenter in Moscow before doctors allowed her to play again. In March 2014, she made a comeback on the ITF Circuit. Since August 2018, Pivovarova again has been inactive.

== ITF Circuit finals ==
Legend
$100,000 tournaments
$75,000 tournaments
$50,000 tournaments
$25,000 tournaments
$15,000 tournaments
$10,000 tournaments

=== Singles: 16 (10 titles, 6 runner-ups) ===
Result	No.	Date	Tournament	Surface	Opponent	Score
Win	1.	13 August 2005	ITF Moscow, Russia	Clay	(Russia) Olga Panova	7–6, 7–6
Loss	1.	12 November 2006	Ismaning Open, Germany	Carpet (i)	(Italy) Astrid Besser	3–6, 3–6
Win	2.	6 May 2007	ITF Bournemouth, United Kingdom	Clay	(United Kingdom) Amanda Elliott	6–1, 6–0
Win	3.	3 June 2007	ITF Moscow, Russia	Clay	(Russia) Ekaterina Makarova	6–3, 7–5
Win	4.	25 August 2007	ITF Moscow, Russia	Clay	(Russia) Anna Lapushchenkova	6–3, 6–4
Win	5.	13 January 2008	ITF St. Leo, United States	Hard	(United States) Audra Cohen	6–4, 6–0
Loss	2.	4 May 2008	ITF Makarska, Croatia	Clay	(Liechtenstein) Stephanie Vogt	2–6, 3–6
Win	6.	15 May 2011	Open Saint-Gaudens, France	Clay	(Netherlands) Arantxa Rus	7–6, 6–7, 6–2
Loss	3.	17 September 2011	Zagreb Ladies Open, Croatia	Clay	(Bulgaria) Dia Evtimova	2–6, 2–6
Win	7.	1 June 2014	ITF Tarsus, Turkey	Clay	(Turkey) Melis Sezer	6–1, 6–2
Loss	4.	27 July 2014	Tampere Open, Finland	Clay	(Greece) Maria Sakkari	4–6, 5–7
Win	8.	6 March 2016	ITF Mildura, Australia	Grass	(Czech Republic) Barbora Štefková	6–4, 4–6, 7–5
Loss	5.	16 April 2016	Lale Cup İstanbul, Turkey	Hard	(Czech Republic) Barbora Štefková	5–7, 6–2, 1–6
Win	9.	22 May 2016	ITF Zhengzhou, China	Hard	(China) Lu Jingjing	6–4, 6–4
Loss	6.	17 July 2016	ITF Stockton, United States	Hard	(Belgium) Alison Van Uytvanck	3–6, 6–3, 2–6
Win	10.	3 December 2017	ITF Santiago, Chile	Clay	(Chile) Fernanda Brito	6–2, 4–6, 6–3

=== Doubles: 19 (7 titles, 12 runner-ups) ===
Outcome	No.	Date	Tournament	Surface	Partner	Opponents	Score
Runner-up	1.	12 August 2006	ITF Moscow, Russia	Clay	(Russia) Yulia Solonitskaya	(Russia) Anastasia Poltoratskaya (Australia) Arina Rodionova	0–6, 2–6
Runner-up	2.	13 May 2007	ITF Edinburgh, UK	Clay	(Russia) Elena Kulikova	(United Kingdom) Anna Hawkins (United Kingdom) Elizabeth Thomas	6–3, 0–6, 4–6
Winner	3.	1 September 2007	ITF Moscow, Russia	Clay	(Russia) Alisa Kleybanova	(Russia) Vasilisa Davydova (Russia) Maria Kondratieva	6–4, 3–6, 6–2
Runner-up	4.	13 January 2008	ITF St. Leo, United States	Hard	(Italy) Corinna Dentoni	(Argentina) Soledad Esperón (Portugal) Frederica Piedade	2–6, 7–6, [7–10]
Runner-up	5.	6 July 2008	Bella Cup, Poland	Clay	(Romania) Mihaela Buzărnescu	(Poland) Olga Brózda (Poland) Magdalena Kiszczyńska	6–4, 4–6, [2–10]
Winner	6.	27 July 2008	ITF Pétange, Luxembourg	Clay	(Italy) Corinna Dentoni	(France) Stéphanie Foretz (Turkey) İpek Şenoğlu	6–4, 6–1
Runner-up	7.	10 May 2009	Zagreb Ladies Open, Croatia	Clay	(Belarus) Ksenia Milevskaya	(Croatia) Petra Martić (Croatia) Ajla Tomljanović	3–6, 7–6, [5–10]
Winner	8.	14 February 2010	ITF Laguna Niguel, U.S.	Hard	(Germany) Laura Siegemund	(United States) Amanda Fink (United States) Elizabeth Lumpkin	6–2, 6–3
Winner	9.	24 April 2010	ITF Bari, Italy	Clay	(Ukraine) Irina Buryachok	(Italy) Giulia Gatto-Monticone (Italy) Federica Quercia	6–7^{(3)}, 6–4, [10–4]
Winner	10.	2 May 2010	ITF Brescia, Italy	Clay	(United Kingdom) Naomi Cavaday	(France) Iryna Brémond (Russia) Valeria Savinykh	6–3, 6–7^{(5)}, [10–8]
Runner-up	11.	15 May 2011	Open Saint-Gaudens, France	Clay	(Ukraine) Olga Savchuk	(France) Caroline Garcia (France) Aurélie Védy	3–6, 3–6
Runner-up	12.	5 August 2012	ITF Bad Saulgau, Germany	Clay	(France) Laura Thorpe	(Spain) Rocio de la Torre Sanchez (Austria) Nicole Rottmann	5–7, 1–6
Runner-up	13.	25 August 2012	ITF Prague, Czech Republic	Clay	(Australia) Arina Rodionova	(Czech Republic) Jesika Malečková (Czech Republic) Tereza Smitková	1–6, 4–6
Runner-up	14.	1 June 2014	ITF Tarsus, Turkey	Clay	(Turkey) Melis Sezer	(Bosnia and Herzegovina) Anita Husarić (Belgium) Kimberley Zimmermann	4–6, 2–6
Runner-up	15.	27 July 2014	Tampere Open, Finland	Clay	(Finland) Emma Laine	(Australia) Alexandra Nancarrow (Greece) Maria Sakkari	2–6, 3–6
Runner-up	16.	18 August 2014	ITF St. Petersburg, Russia	Clay	(Russia) Natela Dzalamidze	(Russia) Vitalia Diatchenko (Belarus) Ilona Kremen	1–6, 3–6
Runner-up	17.	17 November 2014	Asunción Open, Paraguay	Clay	(Romania) Patricia Maria Țig	(Argentina) Guadalupe Pérez Rojas (Argentina) Sofía Luini	3–6, 3–6
Winner	18.	25 September 2017	ITF Hua Hin, Thailand	Hard	(South Korea) Kim Na-ri	(Serbia) Natalija Kostić (Japan) Michika Ozeki	6–4, 6–2
Winner	19.	9 December 2017	ITF Santiago, Chile	Clay	(Belgium) Tamaryn Hendler	(Brazil) Carolina Alves (Mexico) Ana Sofía Sánchez	7–5, 6–2
