= Gaia Sanesi =

Italian tennis player (born 1992)

- Country (sports): Italy
- Residence: Prato, Italy
- Born: 1 April 1992 (age 33) Florence, Italy
- Height: 1.70 m (5 ft 7 in)
- Plays: Left-handed (two-handed backhand)
- Prize money: US$ 93,939

Singles
- Career record: 241–190
- Career titles: 5 ITF
- Highest ranking: No. 294 (14 July 2014)

Doubles
- Career record: 111–70
- Career titles: 10 ITF
- Highest ranking: No. 388 (14 September 2015)

Gaia Sanesi (born 1 April 1992) is an Italian former professional tennis player.

She has career-high WTA rankings of 294 in singles, achieved on 14 July 2014, and 388 in doubles, reached on 14 September 2015. Sanesi won five singles titles and ten doubles titles on the ITF Women's Circuit.

She made her WTA Tour main-draw debut at the 2015 Rio Open in the doubles tournament, partnering Estrella Cabeza Candela.

== ITF Circuit finals ==
=== Singles: 13 (5–8) ===
| Legend $50,000 tournaments $25,000 tournaments $15,000 tournaments $10,000 tournaments | Finals by surface Hard (0–2) Clay (5–6) Grass (0–0) Carpet (0–0) |

| Result | No. | Date | Tournament | Surface | Opponent | Score |
|---|---|---|---|---|---|---|
| Loss | 1. | 23 July 2012 | ITF Horb, Germany | Clay | (Germany) Laura Siegemund | 3–6, 0–6 |
| Win | 1. | 8 July 2013 | ITF Getxo, Spain | Clay | (Argentina) Tatiana Búa | 7–5, 5–7, 7–5 |
| Win | 2. | 15 July 2013 | ITF Knokke, Belgium | Clay | (Switzerland) Tess Sugnaux | 6–3, 6–3 |
| Loss | 2. | 8 June 2015 | ITF Manzanillo, Mexico | Hard | (Mexico) Giuliana Olmos | 1–6, 2–6 |
| Loss | 3. | 21 November 2016 | ITF Hammamet, Tunisia | Clay | (Germany) Katharina Hobgarski | 1–6, 5–7 |
| Loss | 4. | 4 December 2016 | ITF Hammamet, Tunisia | Clay | (Brazil) Carolina Alves | 3–6, 0–6 |
| Loss | 5. | 20 May 2017 | ITF Oeiras, Portugal | Clay | (Hungary) Panna Udvardy | 7–6^{(5)}, 5–7, 4–6 |
| Win | 3. | 17 July 2017 | ITF Târgu Jiu, Romania | Clay | (Romania) Miriam Bulgaru | 6–1, 6–2 |
| Loss | 6. | 13 August 2017 | ITF Las Palmas, Spain | Clay | (Sweden) Cornelia Lister | 4–6, 4–6 |
| Win | 4. | 12 November 2017 | ITF Hammamet, Tunisia | Clay | (Belgium) Marie Benoît | 6–3, 6–0 |
| Win | 5. | 19 November 2017 | ITF Hammamet, Tunisia | Clay | (Russia) Varvara Gracheva | 6–3, 6–4 |
| Loss | 7. | 18 February 2018 | ITF Antalya, Turkey | Hard | (Canada) Rebecca Marino | 2–6, 1–6 |
| Loss | 8. | 8 April 2018 | ITF Jackson, United States | Clay | (Ukraine) Anhelina Kalinina | 0–6, 1–6 |

=== Doubles: 21 (10–11) ===
| Legend $25,000 tournaments $15,000 tournaments $10,000 tournaments | Finals by surface Hard (1–2) Clay (9–9) Carpet (0–0) |

| Result | No. | Date | Tournament | Surface | Partner | Opponents | Score |
|---|---|---|---|---|---|---|---|
| Loss | 1. | 21 January 2013 | ITF Antalya, Turkey | Clay | (Serbia) Natalija Kostić | (South Korea) Lee Jin-a (South Korea) Yoo Mi | 3–6, 1–6 |
| Loss | 2. | 11 March 2013 | ITF Madrid, Spain | Clay | (Italy) Giulia Sussarello | (Russia) Eugeniya Pashkova (Russia) Yana Sizikova | 6–3, 3–6, [5–10] |
| Win | 1. | 18 March 2013 | ITF Madrid, Spain | Clay (i) | (Spain) Lucía Cervera Vázquez | (Argentina) Tatiana Búa (Spain) Arabela Fernández Rabener | 7–5, 6–3 |
| Loss | 3. | 20 May 2013 | ITF Girona, Spain | Clay | (Italy) Giulia Sussarello | (Spain) Yvonne Cavallé Reimers (Spain) Lucía Cervera Vázquez | 6–7^{(4)}, 4–6 |
| Loss | 4. | 17 June 2013 | ITF Alkmaar, Netherlands | Clay | (United States) Bernarda Pera | (Netherlands) Kim van der Horst (Netherlands) Monique Zuur | 3–6, 6–7^{(5)} |
| Loss | 5. | 23 September 2013 | ITF Seville, Spain | Clay | (Chile) Cecilia Costa Melgar | (Brazil) Paula Cristina Gonçalves (Argentina) Florencia Molinero | 3–6, 5–7 |
| Loss | 6. | 13 January 2014 | ITF Sharm El Sheikh, Egypt | Hard | (Greece) Despina Papamichail | (Turkey) Melis Sezer (Turkey) İpek Soylu | 6–4, 4–6, [3–10] |
| Win | 2. | 24 August 2015 | ITF Braunschweig, Germany | Clay | (Japan) Mana Ayukawa | (Germany) Shaline-Doreen Pipa (Germany) Anastazja Rosnowska | 3–6, 7–6^{(5)}, [10–4] |
| Win | 3. | 31 August 2015 | ITF Barcelona, Spain | Clay | (Spain) Aliona Bolsova | (Spain) Estrella Cabeza Candela (Ukraine) Oleksandra Korashvili | 6–3, 6–4 |
| Win | 4. | 15 January 2016 | ITF Fort de France, Martinique | Hard | (Romania) Jaqueline Cristian | (United States) Emina Bektas (United States) Zoë Gwen Scandalis | 7–6^{(5)}, 7–6^{(5)} |
| Loss | 7. | 22 January 2016 | ITF Petit-Bourg, Guadeloupe | Hard | (Romania) Jaqueline Cristian | (Netherlands) Rosalie van der Hoek (Netherlands) Kelly Versteeg | 6–7^{(5)}, 1–6 |
| Win | 5. | 2 May 2016 | ITF Pula, Italy | Clay | (Italy) Federica Arcidiacono | (Italy) Veronica Napolitano (Italy) Anna Remondina | 6–4, 6–1 |
| Win | 6. | 4 March 2017 | ITF Hammamet, Tunisia | Clay | (Italy) Natasha Piludu | (Netherlands) Dominique Karregat (Poland) Sandra Zaniewska | 6–3, 6–2 |
| Loss | 8. | 9 April 2017 | ITF Hammamet, Tunisia | Clay | (Chile) Fernanda Brito | (Italy) Alice Balducci (Italy) Giorgia Marchetti | 6–2, 3–6, [2–10] |
| Win | 7. | 20 May 2017 | ITF Hammamet, Tunisia | Clay | (Italy) Martina Spigarelli | (United Kingdom) Sarah Beth Grey (United Kingdom) Olivia Nicholls | 6–0, 6–2 |
| Win | 8. | 9 June 2017 | ITF Madrid, Spain | Clay | (Belgium) Michaela Boev | (Spain) Ángela Fita Boluda (Russia) Ksenia Kuznetsova | 6–4, 6–3 |
| Loss | 9. | 6 August 2017 | ITF Porto, Portugal | Clay | (Italy) Lucrezia Stefanini | (United Kingdom) Emily Arbuthnott (Denmark) Emilie Francati | 4–6, 3–6 |
| Loss | 10. | 8 April 2018 | ITF Jackson, United States | Clay | (South Africa) Chanel Simmonds | (United States) Sanaz Marand (United States) Whitney Osuigwe | 1–6, 3–6 |
| Win | 9. | 24 February 2019 | ITF Antalya, Turkey | Clay | (Italy) Camilla Scala | (Romania) Cristina Dinu (Romania) Irina Fetecău | 6–7, 6–4, [10–8] |
| Win | 10. | 23 June 2019 | ITF Klosters, Switzerland | Clay | (Switzerland) Lisa Sabino | (Switzerland) Leonie Küng (Bulgaria) Isabella Shinikova | 3–6, 6–1, [10–6] |
| Loss | 11. | 9 September 2023 | ITF Fiano Romano, Italy | Clay | (Switzerland) Lara Michel | (Italy) Enola Chiesa (Italy) Samira de Stefano | 1–6, 4–6 |
