= Florencia Molinero =

Argentine tennis player

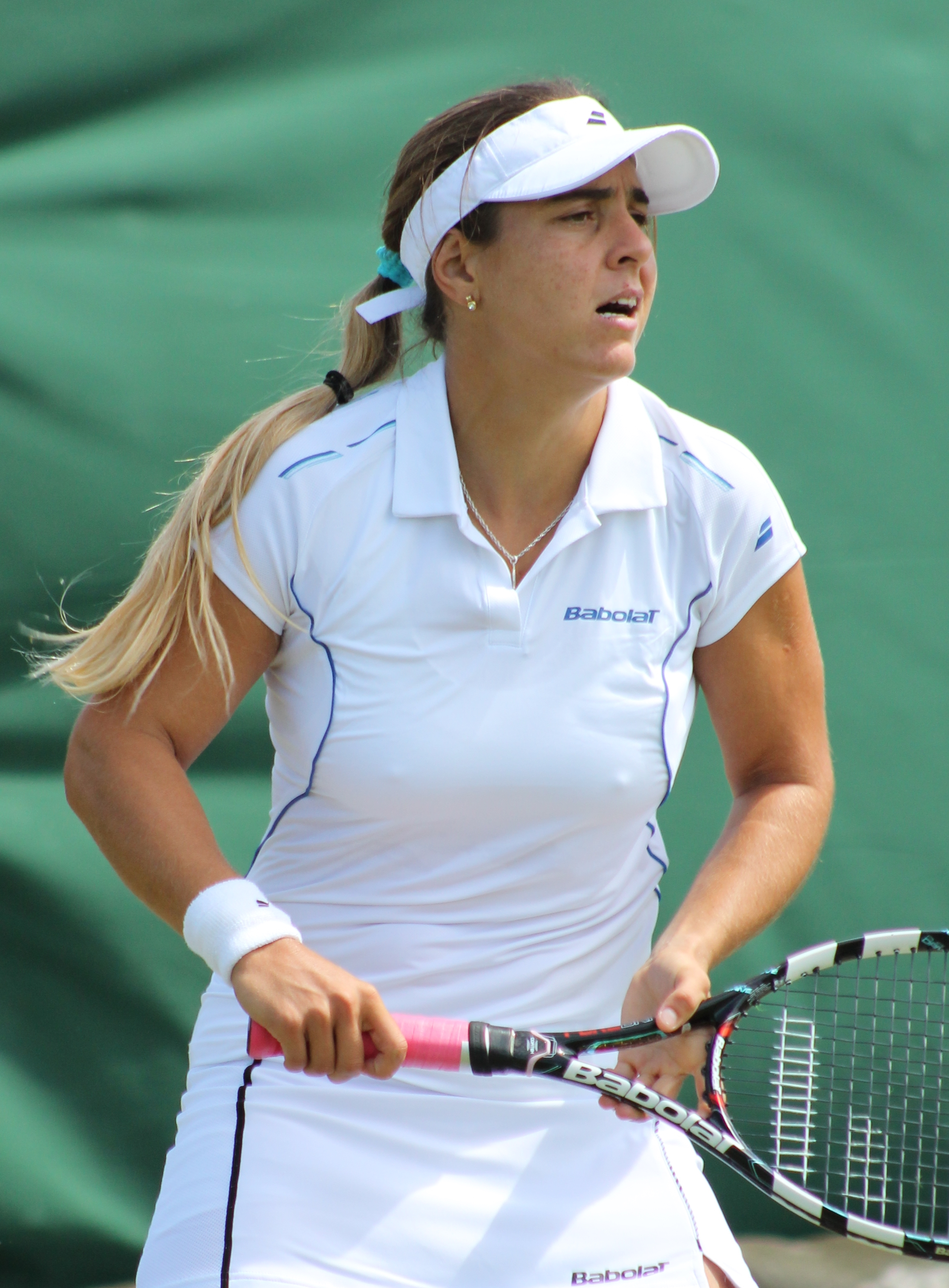
- Country (sports): Argentina
- Residence: Rafaela, Argentina
- Born: 28 November 1988 (age 36); Rafaela, Argentina
- Height: 1.64 m (5 ft 5 in)
- Turned pro: 2004
- Plays: Right (two-handed backhand)
- Prize money: $263,015

Singles
- Career record: 355–222
- Career titles: 9 ITF
- Highest ranking: No. 170 (2 April 2012)

Grand Slam singles results
- Australian Open: Q1 (2011)
- French Open: Q1 (2011, 2012, 2014)
- Wimbledon: Q1 (2011, 2012)
- US Open: Q3 (2010)

Doubles
- Career record: 243–153
- Career titles: 25 ITF
- Highest ranking: 105 (15 September 2014)
Medal record
Representing Argentina
Women's tennis
Pan American Games
Gold medal – first place	2011 Guadalajara	Doubles

Florencia Molinero (Spanish pronunciation: [floˈɾensja moliˈneɾo]; born 28 November 1988) is an Argentine former professional tennis player. She was coached by Leonardo Alonso.

Her highest WTA singles ranking is 170, which she reached on 2 April 2012. Her career-high in doubles is 105, achieved on 15 September 2014.

Playing for Argentina Fed Cup team, Molinero has a win–loss record of 11–4.

== WTA Challenger finals ==
=== Doubles: 1 (runner-up) ===
Result	W–L	Date	Tournament	Surface	Partner	Opponents	Score
Loss	0–1	Feb 2013	Copa Bionaire, Colombia	Clay	(Brazil) Teliana Pereira	(Colombia) Catalina Castaño (Colombia) Mariana Duque	3–6, 6–1, [10–5]

== ITF Circuit finals ==
=== Singles: 23 (9 titles, 14 runner-ups) ===
Legend
$50,000 tournaments
$25,000 tournaments
$10,000 tournaments

Result	No.	Date	Tournament	Surface	Opponent	Score
Win	1.	12 June 2005	ITF Nazaré, Portugal	Hard	(Brazil) Joana Cortez	7–5, 3–6, 6–0
Win	2.	7 November 2005	ITF São Paulo, Brazil	Hard	(Brazil) Joana Cortez	7–5, 7–6
Win	3.	4 December 2005	ITF Havana, Cuba	Hard	(Cuba) Yamile Fors Guerra	6–4, 6–3
Loss	4.	11 September 2006	ITF Caracas, Venezuela	Clay	(Colombia) Mariana Duque Mariño	3–4 ret.
Win	5.	19 March 2007	ITF Coatzacoalcos, Mexico	Hard (i)	(Uruguay) Estefanía Craciún	6–4, 6–3
Loss	6.	12 May 2007	ITF Córdoba, Argentina	Clay	(Argentina) Agustina Lepore	6–1, 0–6, 4–6
Win	7.	19 May 2007	ITF Córdoba	Clay	(Argentina) Soledad Esperón	6–0, 6–2
Loss	8.	3 August 2008	ITF Campos do Jordão, Brazil	Hard	(Argentina) Jorgelina Cravero	3–6, 2–6
Loss	9.	7 September 2008	ITF Alphen aan den Rijn, Netherlands	Clay	(Germany) Stephanie Gehrlein	6–7, 0–6
Loss	10.	18 April 2010	ITF Osprey, United States	Clay	(United States) Jamie Hampton	1–6, 3–6
Loss	11.	3 April 18, 2010	ITF Buenos Aires, Argentina	Clay	(Austria) Patricia Mayr-Achleitner	6–0, 2–6, 2–6
Win	12.	10 July 2011	ITF Aschaffenburg, Germany	Clay	(Liechtenstein) Stephanie Vogt	7–6, 6–1
Loss	13.	4 September 2011	ITF Sarajevo, Bosnia and Herzegovina	Clay	(Croatia) Ani Mijačika	1–6, 6–3, 4–6
Loss	14.	19 November 2011	ITF Asunción, Paraguay	Clay	(Slovakia) Romana Tabak	1–6, 0–6
Loss	15.	1 July 2012	ITF Stuttgart, Germany	Clay	(Ukraine) Kateryna Kozlova	6–3, 5–7, 4–6
Win	16.	23 July 2012	ITF São José do Rio Preto, Brazil	Clay	(Argentina) María Irigoyen	6–3, 6–4
Loss	17.	1 April 2013	ITF Jackson, United States	Clay	(Germany) Laura Siegemund	4–6, 0–6
Win	18.	1 July 2013	ITF São José do Rio Preto	Clay	(Argentina) María Irigoyen	0–6, 6–2, 6–3
Loss	19.	29 September 2013	ITF Seville, Spain	Clay	(Brazil) Teliana Pereira	6–7, 3–6
Win	20.	7 October 2013	ITF Asunción, Paraguay	Clay	(Paraguay) Verónica Cepede Royg	6–3, 7–6
Loss	21.	29 June 2014	ITF Périgueux, France	Clay	(Netherlands) Cindy Burger	5–7, 1–6
Loss	22.	22 November 2014	ITF Asunción, Paraguay	Clay	(Peru) Bianca Botto	3–6, 2–6
Loss	23.	6 December 2014	ITF Santiago, Chile	Clay	(Peru) Bianca Botto	6–3, 5–7, 1–6

=== Doubles: 51 (25 titles, 26 runner-ups) ===
Legend
$100,000 tournaments
$75,000 tournaments
$50,000 tournaments
$25,000 tournaments
$10,000 tournaments

Result	No.	Date	Tournament	Surface	Partner	Opponents	Score
Loss	1.	25 November 2006	ITF Córdoba, Argentina	Clay	(Argentina) Veronica Spiegel	(Brazil) Teliana Pereira (Belgium) Yanina Wickmayer	5–7, 4–6
Loss	2.	11 May 2007	ITF Córdoba	Clay	(Argentina) Luciana Sarmenti	(Argentina) Soledad Esperón (Argentina) Agustina Lepore	1–6, 2–6
Win	3.	6 October 2007	ITF Monterrey, Mexico	Hard	(Mexico) Melissa Torres Sandoval	(Portugal) Frederica Piedade (Brazil) Roxane Vaisemberg	6–1, 7–5
Win	4.	1 September 2008	ITF Alphen aan den Rijn, Netherlands	Clay	(Ukraine) Lesia Tsurenko	(Croatia) Darija Jurak (Serbia) Vojislava Lukić	4–6, 7–5, [10–7]
Loss	5.	4 October 2008	ITF Juárez, Mexico	Clay	(Argentina) Soledad Esperón	(Argentina) Jorgelina Cravero (Argentina) Betina Jozami	0–6, 6–7
Loss	6.	11 October 2008	ITF San Luis Potosí, Mexico	Clay	(Argentina) Soledad Esperón	(Brazil) Maria Fernanda Alves (Portugal) Frederica Piedade	7–5, 1–6, [8–10]
Win	7.	23 May 2009	ITF Santos, Brazil	Clay	(Australia) Monique Adamczak	(Bolivia) María Fernanda Álvarez Terán (Argentina) María Irigoyen	1–6, 6–1, [10–7]
Win	8.	11 July 2009	ITF La Coruña, Spain	Hard	(Argentina) María Irigoyen	(Serbia) Vesna Dolonc (Belarus) Ksenia Milevskaya	6–2, 6–4
Loss	9.	23 November 2009	ITF Puebla, Mexico	Hard	(Brazil) Maria Fernanda Alves	(United States) Amanda Fink (United States) Elizabeth Lumpkin	4–6, 7–6, [8–10]
Loss	10.	18 January 2010	ITF Lutz, United States	Clay	(Brazil) Maria Fernanda Alves	(France) Aurélie Védy (United States) Mashona Washington	3–6, 3–6
Win	11.	20 March 2010	ITF Irapuato, Mexico	Hard	(Argentina) María Irigoyen	(United States) Lena Litvak (Russia) Natalia Ryzhonkova	6–7, 6–2, [10–7]
Loss	12.	10 April 2010	ITF Jackson, United States	Clay	(Argentina) María Irigoyen	(Brazil) Maria Fernanda Alves (Brazil) Ana Clara Duarte	4–6, 6–3, [5–10]
Win	13.	18 April 2010	ITF Osprey, United States	Clay	(Argentina) María Irigoyen	(United States) Madison Brengle (United States) Asia Muhammad	6–1, 7–6
Win	14.	10 May 2010	ITF Rio de Janeiro, Brazil	Clay	(Brazil) Maria Fernanda Alves	(Argentina) Mailen Auroux (Brazil) Fernanda Hermenegildo	6–2, 6–4
Loss	15.	13 June 2010	ITF Budapest, Hungary	Clay	(Germany) Anna Livadaru	(Serbia) Teodora Mirčić (Slovakia) Lenka Wienerová	0–6, 2–6
Loss	16.	26 July 2010	ITF Bucharest, Romania	Clay	(Argentina) María Irigoyen	(Romania) Irina-Camelia Begu (Romania) Elena Bogdan	1–6, 1–6
Win	17.	20 September 2010	ITF Foggia, Italy	Clay	(Argentina) María Irigoyen	(Spain) Estrella Cabeza Candela (Spain) Laura Pous Tió	6–2, 6–2
Loss	18.	25 October 2010	ITF Bayamón, Puerto Rico	Hard	(Argentina) María Irigoyen	(Brazil) Maria Fernanda Alves (Canada) Marie-Ève Pelletier	6–7, 4–6
Loss	19.	28 March 2011	ITF Buenos Aires, Argentina	Clay	(Argentina) María Irigoyen	(Bolivia) María Fernanda Álvarez Terán (Argentina) Paula Ormaechea	6–4, 5–7, 4–6
Win	20.	20 June 2011	ITF Périgueux, France	Clay	(Japan) Erika Sema	(Spain) Leticia Costas-Moreira (Spain) Inés Ferrer Suárez	6–2, 3–6, [10–7]
Loss	21.	27 June 2011	ITF Middelburg, Netherlands	Clay	(United States) Julia Cohen	(Netherlands) Quirine Lemoine (Ukraine) Maryna Zanevska	3–6, 4–6
Loss	22.	3 September 2011	ITF Sarajevo, Bosnia and Herzegovina	Clay	(Portugal) Maria João Koehler	(Croatia) Maria Abramović (Croatia) Ana Vrljić	5–7, 7–6, [10–4]
Win	23.	10 September 2011	ITF Podgorica, Montenegro	Clay	(Italy) Corinna Dentoni	(Montenegro) Danka Kovinic (Montenegro) Danica Krstajić	6–4, 5–7, 6–2
Loss	24.	6 February 2012	ITF Bertioga, Brazil	Hard	(Paraguay) Verónica Cepede Royg	(Argentina) Mailen Auroux (Argentina) María Irigoyen	3–6, 1–6
Win	25.	15 July 2012	ITF Aschaffenburg, Germany	Clay	(Liechtenstein) Stephanie Vogt	(Denmark) Malou Ejdesgaard (Hungary) Réka Luca Jani	6–3, 7–6
Loss	26.	7 January 2013	ITF Innisbrook, United States	Clay	(Venezuela) Adriana Pérez	(Chinese Taipei) Hsu Chieh-yu (Norway) Ulrikke Eikeri	3–6, 0–6
Loss	27.	14 January 2013	ITF Port St. Lucie, United States	Clay	(Venezuela) Adriana Pérez	(United States) Allie Will (Russia) Angelina Gabueva	6–4, 2–6, [7–10]
Loss	28.	14 July 2013	ITF Campinas, Brazil	Clay	(Argentina) Carolina Zeballos	(Paraguay) Verónica Cepede Royg (Venezuela) Adriana Pérez	0–6, 1–6
Win	29.	20 September 2013	ITF Saint-Malo, France	Clay	(Bulgaria) Elitsa Kostova	(Liechtenstein) Kathinka von Deichmann (Germany) Nina Zander	6–2, 6–4
Win	30.	23 September 2013	ITF Sevilla, Spain	Clay	(Brazil) Paula Cristina Gonçalves	(Chile) Cecilia Costa Melgar (Italy) Gaia Sanesi	6–3, 7–5
Win	31.	6 October 2013	ITF La Vall d'Uixó, Spain	Clay	(France) Laura Thorpe	(Netherlands) Cindy Burger (Netherlands) Arantxa Rus	6–1, 6–4
Win	32.	7 October 2013	ITF Asunción, Paraguay	Clay	(Brazil) Laura Pigossi	(Argentina) Vanesa Furlanetto (Argentina) Carolina Zeballos	5–7, 6–4, [10–8]
Loss	33.	28 October 2013	ITF Caracas, Venezuela	Hard	(Brazil) Laura Pigossi	(Paraguay) Verónica Cepede Royg (Venezuela) Adriana Pérez	3–6, 3–6
Win	34.	25 November 2013	ITF Monterrey, Mexico	Hard	(Brazil) Laura Pigossi	(Netherlands) Indy de Vroome (Slovakia) Lenka Wienerová	7–5, 7–5
Win	35.	15 December 2013	ITF Mérida, Mexico	Hard	(Argentina) Vanesa Furlanetto	(Romania) Laura Ioana Andrei (Russia) Marina Melnikova	2–6, 7–6, [10–7]
Loss	36.	26 May 2014	ITF Grado, Italy	Clay	(Spain) Lara Arruabarrena	(Paraguay) Verónica Cepede Royg (Liechtenstein) Stephanie Vogt	4–6, 2–6
Win	37.	2 June 2014	ITF Brescia, Italy	Clay	(United States) Sanaz Marand	(United States) Louisa Chirico (United States) Asia Muhammad	6–4, 4–6, [10–8]
Loss	38.	9 June 2014	ITF Padua, Italy	Clay	(Brazil) Paula Cristina Gonçalves	(Italy) Gioia Barbieri (Georgia (country)) Sofia Shapatava	4–6, 6–0, [12–14]
Loss	39.	23 June 2014	ITF Périgueux, France	Clay	(Brazil) Gabriela Cé	(Venezuela) Andrea Gámiz (Spain) Sara Sorribes Tormo	7–5, 4–6, [8–10]
Win	40.	30 June 2014	ITF Denain, France	Clay	(Brazil) Paula Cristina Gonçalves	(United Kingdom) Nicola Slater (Australia) Karolina Wlodarczak	7–6, 7–6
Win	41.	11 July 2014	Open de Biarritz, France	Clay	(Liechtenstein) Stephanie Vogt	(Spain) Lourdes Domínguez Lino (Brazil) Teliana Pereira	6–2, 6–2
Win	42.	8 August 2014	ITF Caracas, Venezuela	Hard	(Argentina) Vanesa Furlanetto	(France) Clothilde de Bernardi (Japan) Ayaka Okuno	6–0, 6–0
Win	43.	16 August 2014	ITF Bogotá, Colombia	Clay	(Spain) Lara Arruabarrena	(Austria) Melanie Klaffner (Austria) Patricia Mayr-Achleitner	6–2, 6–0
Loss	44.	29 September 2014	ITF Monterrey, Mexico	Hard	(Georgia (country)) Sofia Shapatava	(Slovenia) Nastja Kolar (Slovakia) Chantal Škamlová	3–6, 6–2, [5–10]
Loss	45.	8 March 2015	ITF Curitiba, Brazil	Clay	(Spain) Beatriz García Vidagany	(Belgium) Ysaline Bonaventure (Sweden) Rebecca Peterson	6–4, 3–6, [5–10]
Win	46.	22 June 2015	ITF Périgueux, France	Clay	(Brazil) Gabriela Cé	(Mexico) Victoria Rodríguez (Mexico) Marcela Zacarías	6–3, 6–2
Loss	47.	29 June 2015	ITF Denain, France	Clay	(Switzerland) Xenia Knoll	(Belgium) Elise Mertens (Turkey) İpek Soylu	6–7^{(3–7)}, 3–6
Loss	48.	17 October 2015	ITF Rock Hill, United States	Hard	(Bulgaria) Elitsa Kostova	(Bosnia and Herzegovina) Ema Burgić Bucko (Mexico) Renata Zarazúa	5–7, 2–6
Loss	49.	4 December 2015	ITF Santiago, Chile	Clay	(Brazil) Laura Pigossi	(Mexico) Victoria Rodríguez (Mexico) Renata Zarazúa	2–6, 7–5, [7–10]
Win	50.	6 March 2016	ITF Campinas, Brazil	Clay	(Brazil) Gabriela Cé	(Argentina) Guadalupe Pérez Rojas (Argentina) Nadia Podoroska	1–6, 6–4, [10–4]
Win	51.	2 July 2016	ITF Stuttgart, Germany	Clay	(North Macedonia) Lina Gjorcheska	(Russia) Aminat Kushkhova (Czech Republic) Diana Šumová	1–6, 6–1, [10–7]
