= 2022 Engie Open de Biarritz =

Tennis tournament

- Date: 6–12 June 2022
- Edition: 19th
- Category: ITF Women's World Tennis Tour
- Prize money: $60,000
- Surface: Clay / Outdoor
- Location: Biarritz, France

Champions

Singles
- (Germany) Mina Hodzic

Doubles
- (Kazakhstan) Anna Danilina / (Ukraine) Valeriya Strakhova
| ← 2021 · | Open de Biarritz | · 2023 → |

The 2022 Engie Open de Biarritz was a professional tennis tournament played on outdoor clay courts.

The tournament, which is for professional female tennis players, took place in Biarritz, France from 6 to 12 June 2022. It was the nineteenth edition of the tournament which was part of the 2022 ITF Women's World Tennis Tour.

== Champions ==
=== Singles ===
- (Germany) Mina Hodzic def. (France) Lucie Nguyen Tan, 6–3, 6–3

=== Doubles ===
- (Kazakhstan) Anna Danilina / (Ukraine) Valeriya Strakhova def. (Argentina) María Lourdes Carlé / Maria Timofeeva, 2–6, 6–3, [14–12]

== Singles main draw entrants ==
=== Seeds ===
| Country | Player | Rank^{1} | Seed |
|---|---|---|---|
| FRA | Chloé Paquet | 101 | 1 |
| BEL | Ysaline Bonaventure | 168 | 2 |
| | Erika Andreeva | 169 | 3 |
| ARG | María Lourdes Carlé | 203 | 4 |
| SUI | Joanne Züger | 216 | 5 |
| JPN | Yuki Naito | 219 | 6 |
| LTU | Justina Mikulskytė | 242 | 7 |
| COL | Emiliana Arango | 246 | 8 |

- ^{1} Rankings are as of 23 May 2022.

=== Other entrants ===
The following players received wildcards into the singles main draw:

- (France) Océane Babel
- (France) Lucie Nguyen Tan
- (France) Marine Partaud
- Maria Timofeeva

The following players received entry from the qualifying draw:

- (France) Audrey Albié
- (France) Julie Belgraver
- (France) Sara Cakarevic
- (Germany) Mina Hodzic
- (Netherlands) Merel Hoedt
- (France) Margaux Rouvroy
- (Belgium) Lara Salden
- (Germany) Emily Seibold
