= 2022 Engie Open de Biarritz – Doubles =

Doubles
- 2022 Engie Open de Biarritz

Final
- Champions: (Kazakhstan) Anna Danilina (Ukraine) Valeriya Strakhova
- Runners-up: (Argentina) María Lourdes Carlé; Maria Timofeeva
- Score: 2–6, 6–3, [14–12]

Events
| Singles | Doubles |
| ← 2021 · | Open de Biarritz | · 2023 → |

The 2022 Engie Open de Biarritz – Doubles was the doubles event of the Open de Biarritz, a professional women's tennis tournament played on outdoor clay courts.

Oksana Selekhmeteva and Daniela Vismane were the defending champions the 2022 doubles event of the Open de Biarritz but chose not to participate.

Anna Danilina and Valeriya Strakhova won the title, defeating María Lourdes Carlé and Maria Timofeeva in the final, 2–6, 6–3, [14–12].

== Seeds ==
1. (Kazakhstan) Anna Danilina / (Ukraine) Valeriya Strakhova (champions)
2. (Argentina) María Lourdes Carlé / Maria Timofeeva (final)
3. (Spain) Marina Bassols Ribera / (Switzerland) Conny Perrin (quarterfinals)
4. (Belgium) Marie Benoît / (Belgium) Ysaline Bonaventure (semifinals)

== Draw ==
=== Key ===
- Q = Qualifier
- WC = Wild card
- LL = Lucky loser
- Alt = Alternate
- SE = Special exempt
- PR = Protected ranking
- ITF = ITF entry
- JE = Junior exempt
- w/o = Walkover
- r = Retired
- d = Defaulted
- SR = Special ranking

=== Draw ===
First round
(Belgium) L Salden (India) P Thombare | 6 | 6
(Belgium) M Kempen (France) L Tholey | 2 | 2
4 | (Belgium) M Benoît (Belgium) Y Bonaventure | 6 | 6
E Andreeva; E Kazionova | 2 | 2
(France) M Bannmeyer (France) N Mercadier | 0 | 2
(France) J Belgraver (Netherlands) M Hoedt | 6 | 6
(France) M Partaud (Netherlands) E Vedder | 6 | 7
(France) A Albié (France) M Rouvroy | 3 | 5
(France) O Babel (France) L Nguyen Tan | 6 | 2 | [10]
(Lithuania) J Mikulskytė (Australia) A Osborne | 0 | 6 | [12]

Quarterfinals
1 | (Kazakhstan) A Danilina (Ukraine) V Strakhova | 7 | 6
(Belgium) L Salden (India) P Thombare | 5 | 4
4 | (Belgium) M Benoît (Belgium) Y Bonaventure | 7 | 5 | [10]
(France) J Belgraver (Netherlands) M Hoedt | 5 | 7 | [1]
(France) M Partaud (Netherlands) E Vedder | 3 | 6 | [10]
3 | (Spain) M Bassols Ribera (Switzerland) C Perrin | 6 | 3 | [6]
(Lithuania) J Mikulskytė (Australia) A Osborne | 4 | 4
2 | (Argentina) ML Carlé; M Timofeeva | 6 | 6

Semifinals
1 | (Kazakhstan) A Danilina (Ukraine) V Strakhova | 6 | 6
4 | (Belgium) M Benoît (Belgium) Y Bonaventure | 3 | 2
(France) M Partaud (Netherlands) E Vedder | 4 | 5
2 | (Argentina) ML Carlé; M Timofeeva | 6 | 7

Final
1 | (Kazakhstan) A Danilina (Ukraine) V Strakhova | 2 | 6 | [14]
2 | (Argentina) ML Carlé; M Timofeeva | 6 | 3 | [12]
