= Longest tiebreaker in tennis =

Several tiebreaks have been attributed as the longest tiebreak in tennis.

Match tie-breaks (also referred to as supertiebreakers or champions tie-breaks), where a single game is used to decide a match when the score is one set all, have been in general use in doubles matches on the professional tours since the early 2000s. Although it had previously been used occasionally in tournaments affected by bad weather, from the beginning of 2019 the "10 point" match tie-break also became the official method of deciding singles qualifying matches which had reached one set all in ITF tournaments. From the beginning of 2023, when $40,000 tournaments were added to the ITF women's calendar, this rule was changed to apply only to $15,000 and $25,000 ($30,000 from January 1st 2025) tournaments, with all higher-ranked events reverting to the best of three tie-break sets.

Starting from the 2022 French Open, a rule change was agreed to by every Grand Slam tournament, as well as the Olympic Games from 2024, that a 10-point (rather than 7 point) tie-break would be played once the deciding set became tied at 6 games all.

== Men's singles ==
=== Overall ===
- In August 2013, at the $10,000 Men’s Futures tournament qualifications in Zlatibor, Serbia, Marko Rajic defeated Sasa Vidojevic in a 78-point tiebreak 7–6 (40–38) 6–3. Despite the match being played without any chair umpire or any lines people, its score has been verified by the ITF and ATP
- In January 2013, at the $10,000 Men's Futures tournament qualifications in Plantation, Florida, Benjamin Balleret defeated Guillaume Couillard in a 70-point tiebreak 7–6^{(36–34)}, 6–1. Despite the match being played without any chair umpire or any lines people, its score has been verified by the ITF and ATP. Both players were part of the Monaco Davis Cup team.
- In 23 January 2016, at the $25,000 Kazakhstan F1 Men's Futures tournament in Aktobe, Evgenii Tiurnev defeated Danilo Petrovićin a 48-point tiebreak, 7–6^{(25–23)}, 6–3 in the final.

=== Grand Slam events ===
==== Wimbledon ====
- Björn Borg defeated Premjit Lall 6–3, 6–4, 9–8^{(20–18)} in the first round of the men's singles in 1973.
- John McEnroe and Borg took over 20 minutes to complete a fourth set tiebreaker in the 1980 men's singles final, with McEnroe winning 18–16. Borg eventually won the match 1–6, 7–5, 6–3, 6–7^{(16–18)}, 8–6.
- John Isner won 19–17 in a first set tiebreaker against Jarkko Nieminen in the second round in 2014, eventually winning the match 7–6^{(19–17)}, 7–6^{(7–3)}, 7–5.
- Alexander Zverev won 17–15 in a third-set tiebreaker against Cameron Norrie in the third round in 2024, winning the match 6–4, 6–4, 7–6^{(17–15)}.
- Matteo Berrettini won the second set 7–6^{(18–16)} against Stan Wawrinka in the first round in 2026.

==== US Open ====
- Goran Ivanišević and Daniel Nestor played a 20–18 tiebreaker in their 1993 US Open first round match, won by Ivanišević 6–4, 7–6^{(7–5)}, 7–6^{(20–18)}.
- Ken Flach won the deciding tie-break 17–15 over Darren Cahill during their second round match at the 1987 US Open. Flach survived 1–6, 6–4, 3–6, 6–1, 7–6 saving five match points.
- Novak Djokovic won the first-set tiebreaker 16–14 over Alexandr Dolgopolov during their fourth round matchup at the 2011 US Open. Djokovic won the match in straight sets 7–6^{(16–14)}, 6–4, 6–2, and eventually the tournament.
- In the 2012 US Open men's singles final, Andy Murray won the first set tiebreaker against Djokovic 12–10, which was the longest tiebreak in a US Open final, and went on to win the match 7–6^{(12–10)}, 7–5, 2–6, 3–6, 6–2.

==== Australian Open ====
- Jo-Wilfried Tsonga won a tiebreaker 20–18 in his first round match against Andy Roddick at the 2007 Australian Open, but Roddick eventually won the match, 6–7^{(18–20)}, 7–6^{(7–2)}, 6–3, 6–3.
- Pedro Martínez won a tie break 17–15 in his first round match against Federico Delbonis at the 2022 Australian Open. Martinez won 7–6^{(17–15)}, 3–6, 6–4, 6–2.
- Rafael Nadal 16–14 in a first-set tiebreaker against Adrian Mannarino in the fourth round in 2022, Nadal eventually won 7–6^{(16–14)}, 6–2, 6–2.

==== French Open ====
- Lorenzo Sonego won the third set tiebreaker 19–17 against Taylor Fritz in their third round match at the 2020 French Open. Sonego won 7–6^{(7–5)}, 6–3, 7–6^{(19–17)}. The previous longest tie-break at French Open: 16–14 (twice)

=== Other long tiebreakers ===
- Aki Rahunen won a 24–22 first set tiebreak against Peter Nyborg in the first round of qualifying of the 1992 Copenhagen Open, going on to win the match 7–6^{(24–22)}, 2–6, 6–3.
- Reilly Opelka won a 24–22 second set tiebreak against John Isner in the semifinals of the 2022 Dallas Open, winning the match 7–6^{(9–7)}, 7–6^{(24–22)}. Opelka won on his eighth match point, the first coming at 7–6, and saved 10 set points from Isner, the first of which had come at 6–5.
- Gary Lugassy won a 22–20 second set tiebreak against Igor Zelenay in the first round of the 2008 BH Telecom Indoors, setting the record for the longest main draw tiebreak at an ATP Challenger Tour event. The final score was 6–2, 7–6^{(22–20)}.
- Guillermo Olaso won a 22–20 first set tiebreak against Evgeny Karlovskiy in the final qualifying round of the 2018 RBC Tennis Championships of Dallas, equalling the longest tie break in a Challenger event (as above).
- Romain Faucon won 22–20 in a deciding set tie-break against Max Wiskandt in the first round of a $15k ITF tournament in Manacor on January 10, 2024, winning the match 3–6, 7–6^{(7–2)}, 7–6^{(22–20)}.
- Valentin Royer won a 21–19 second set tiebreak against Arthur Cazaux in the second round of qualifying for the 2022 Open International de Tennis de Roanne. He won on his 12th set point, having saved four match points from Cazaux, and went on to win the match 6–7^{(3–7)}, 7–6^{(21–19)}, 6–3. The tie-break lasted 32 minutes and 44 seconds, Royer winning the final 16 shot rally with a backhand volley.
- Goran Ivanišević won a 20–18 deciding set tiebreak against Greg Rusedski in the semifinals of the 1997 Stella Artois Championships at Queen's Club.
- Roger Federer and Marat Safin played a tiebreaker that lasted 26 minutes in the semifinals of the 2004 Tennis Masters Cup in Houston. Federer won the match 6–3, 7–6^{(20–18)}.
- José Acasuso won 20–18 in a deciding set tiebreak against Björn Phau in the first round of the 2006 Rogers Masters in Canada.
- Andy Murray won 20–18 in a second-set tiebreak against Philipp Kohlschreiber in the quarterfinals of the 2017 Dubai Open in Dubai. The tiebreak lasted 31 minutes, and featured a rule-breaking moment when both players and the umpire forgot to change ends at 15–15.
- Gijs Brouwer won 20–18 in a deciding set tiebreak against Alen Avidzba in the second round of the 2019 $25k USTA Men's Pro Tennis Championships of Calabasas in Calabasas, California, USA.
- Leonardo Mayer won 20–18 in a second-set tiebreak against Marco Cecchinato in the first round of the 2020 ASB Classic in Auckland, but Cecchinato won the match, 7–6^{(8–6)}, 6–7^{(18–20)}, 7–6^{(7–2)}.
- Ryan Storrie won 20–18 in a second set tiebreak against Alexis Gautier in the first round of a $25k ITF tournament in Sunderland on January 16, 2024, winning the match 6–3, 7–6^{(20–18)}.
- Saba Purtseladze won 19–17 in a second set tie-break against Marcello Serafini in a semifinal at the $15k tournament in Sharm El Sheikh, Egypt, on October 8, 2022, winning the match 6–2, 7–6^{(19–17)}. He won on his fifth match point, having saved five set points against him.
- Paul Jubb won 19–17 in a final set tiebreak against Ernesto Escobedo in the first round of the 2022 Knoxville Challenger, winning the match 6–4, 3–6, 7–6^{(19–17)}. He won on his sixth match point, having saved seven against him.
- Elijah Strode won 19–17 in a first set tie-break against Nick Chappell in the first round at the $25k ITF tournament in Xalapa, Mexico, on April 30, 2024, but Chappell won the match 6–7^{(17–19)}, 6–3, 6–4.
- Grégoire Barrère lost the first set tie-break 17–19 when he played Valentin Royer in the quarter-final of the All In Open Challenger in Lyon, France, on November 14, 2024, but went on to win the match 6–7^{(17–19)}, 6–3, 7–6^{(7–5)}.
- Philipp Kohlschreiber won 18–16 in a deciding set tiebreak against Dustin Brown in the quarterfinals of the 2014 Gerry Weber Open in Halle.
- Gilles Müller won 18–16 in a second set tiebreak against John Isner in the second round of the 2016 Aegon Championships at Queen's Club.
- Lorenzo Frigerio won 18–16 in a second set tie-break against Corentin Denolly in the second round of the 2019 $15k Internationaux de Bressuire, and went on to win the match 6–7^{(5–7)}, 7–6^{(18–16)}, 6–3.
- Christopher Eubanks won 18–16 in a second-set tiebreak against Ryan Harrison in the first round of qualifying at the 2021 Hall of Fame Open in Newport, Rhode Island, USA, but Harrison won the match, 7–6^{(7–4)}, 6–7^{(16–18)}, 7–6^{(10–8)}. Eubanks took the second set on his fourth set point, having saved five match points in the tie-break. Harrison needed two more match points in the third set tie-break before completing the win, having saved a match point from Eubanks at 7–8.
- Mattias Southcombe won 18–16 in a second set tie-break against Alex Knaff in the first round of qualifying at the $15k tournament in Monastir, Tunisia, on September 12, 2021, and went on to win the match 2–6, 7–6^{(18–16)}, [10–7].
- Adam Jones won 18–16 in a second set tie-break against Andrés Urrea in the second round of qualifying at the $15k tournament in Cancún, Mexico, on October 4, 2021, winning the match 6–0, 7–6^{(18–16)}.
- Ethan Quinn won 18–16 in a second set tie-break against Juan Pablo Grassi Mazzuchi in the second round of qualifying at the $25k tournament in Austin, Texas, USA, on November 16, 2021, but Grassi Mazzuchi went on to win the match 7–6^{(7–3)}, 6–7^{(16–18)}, [10–7].
- Arthur Rinderknech won 18–16 in a deciding set tie-break against Pablo Carreño Busta in a quarter-final at the Gijón Open on October 14, 2022, winning the match 4–6, 6–3, 7–6^{(18–16)}. He won on his sixth match point, having saved nine match points against him, the first two of which came in the tenth game of the final set.
- Max Batyutenko won 18–16 in a first set tie-break against Issei Okamura in the second round of qualifying at the $15k tournament in Aktobe, Kazakhstan, on February 28, 2023, and went on to win the match 7–6^{(18–16)}, 4–6, [10–7].

=== Longest match tie-break ===
- Ugo Blanchet defeated Edoardo Graziani 6–0, 3–6, [23–21] in the third and final round of qualifying in the $25k tournament in Faro, Portugal, on March 2, 2021. Graziani had the first two match points at 9–7 in the tie-break, and had a further five before Blanchet won on his eighth match point. Graziani lost the last point with an unforced error by smashing the ball to the net. Graziani then got through to the main draw as a Lucky Loser.

=== Other long match tie-breaks ===
- Leonardo Aboian defeated Tristan Boyer 6–3, 4–6, [22–20] in the second round of qualifying at the $15k tournament in Buenos Aires, Argentina, on April 30, 2019.
- Ivan La Cava defeated Credit Chaiyarin 6–2, 3–6, [22–20] in the first round of qualifying at the $15k tournament in Antalya, Turkey, on March 12, 2023.
- Han Cheng defeated Zhao Zhao 2–6, 6–4, [21–19] in the first round of qualifying at the $25k tournament in Shenzhen, China, on June 10, 2019. Each player had six match points in the decider.
- Carles Hernández defeated Sergi Pérez Contri 6–7^{(3–7)}, 6–4, [21–19] in the first round of qualifying at the $25k tournament in Getxo, Spain, on July 3, 2022.
- Alexandre Aubriot defeated Leo Raquillet 6–3, 4–6, [21–19] in the second round of qualifying at the $15k tournament in Grenoble, France, on February 5, 2024.
- Florian Lakat defeated Wilson Leite 4–6, 6–4, [20–18] in the first round of qualifying at the $25k tournament in Palm Coast, Florida, United States, on February 3, 2020.
- Lawrence Bataljin defeated Kosuke Ogura 6–1, 5–7, [20–18] in the first round of qualifying at the $15k tournament in Cairo, Egypt, on April 11, 2021.
- Jordi Mas de Ugarte defeated Hans Albert Schubert 6–2, 4–6, [20–18] in the first round of qualifying at the $15k tournament in Platja d'Aro, Spain, on October 10, 2021.
- Dominic Ducariu defeated Samuil Konov 7–5, 4–6, [20–18] in the third round of qualifying at the $15k tournament in Satu Mare, Romania, on September 12, 2023. Ducariu won on his sixth match point, having saved the first of five against him at 8–9.
- Gabriel Sardo defeated Vito dell'Elba 6–1, 3–6, [20–18] in the first round of qualifying at the $15k tournament in Monastir on October 13, 2024.
- Vojtech Mares defeated Patrik Homola 7–6^{(7–1)}, 6–7^{(1–7)}, [20–18] in the second round of qualifying at the $25k tournament in Trnava, Slovakia, on October 22, 2024.
- Francisco Llanes defeated Zura Tkemaladze 5–7, 6–3, [19–17] in the first round of qualifying at the $15k tournament in Antalya on May 9, 2021.
- Perry Gregg defeated Nicolas Bruna 6–3, 2–6, [19–17] in the first round of qualifying at the $15k tournament in Monastir, Tunisia, on June 13, 2021.
- Matteo Fondriest defeated Daniel Pátý 7–6^{(12–10)}, 4–6, [19–17] in the second round of qualifying at the $15k tournament in Litija, Slovenia, on June 13, 2023.
- Juan Cruz Collardin defeated Tobia Grandinetti 5–7, 6–4, [19–17] in the third round of qualifying at the $25k tournament in Rosario, Argentina, on June 25, 2023.
- Christian Fellin defeated Matias Riva 6–3, 6–7^{(4–7)}, [19–17] in the second round of qualifying at the $15k tournament in Doboj, Bosnia and Herzegovina, on May 6, 2024.
- Anton Shepp defeated Elijah Strode 3–6, 7–6^{(7–2)}, [19–17] in the first round of qualifying at the $15k tournament in San Diego, United States, on June 3, 2024.
- Yang Xiao-yin defeated Cao Yi-tao 6–7^{(3–7)}, 7–6^{(7–3)}, [19–17] in the second round of qualifying at the $25k tournament in Qiandaohu, China, on October 28, 2024.
- Finley Hall defeated Charlie Camus 6–7^{(5–7)}, 6–4, [19–17] in the final round of qualifying at the $25k tournament in Brisbane, Australia, on November 12, 2024. He won on his eighth match point, the first of which came at 9–7, having saved three match points from Camus.
- Tobia Costanzo Baragiola Mordini defeated Gian Matias Di Natale 6–4, 1–6, [19–17] in the first round of qualifying at the $15k tournament in Antalya on December 8, 2024.
- Ivan Liutarevich defeated Grigoriy Korobeynikov 6–3, 5–7, [18–16] in the first round of qualifying at the $25k tournament in Namangan, Uzbekistan, on April 29, 2019. He won on his third match point, having saved seven match points along the way.
- Eric Caleguer defeated Anton Desyatnik 1–6, 7–5, [18–16] in the first round of qualifying at the $15k tournament in Tabarka, Tunisia, on July 15, 2019.
- Tom Hands defeated Josip Krstanović 6–1, 1–6, [18–16] in the first round of qualifying at the $25k tournament in Barnstaple, Great Britain, on February 9, 2020. Krstanović had three match points at 9–6 in the tie-breaker, but lost the lot. He had three further match points before Hands won on his fifth match point.
- Ken Onishi defeated Maikel De Boes 6–4, 3–6, [18–16] in the second round of qualifying at the $15k tournament in Cairo on January 25, 2021.
- Aaron Cohen defeated Osgar O'Hoisin 6–4, 5–7, [18–16] in the third round of qualifying at the $15k tournament in Torelló, Spain, on March 1, 2022.
- Peetu Pohjola defeated Asier Civera Martínez 6–4, 3–6, [18–16] in the first round of qualifying at the $25k tournament in Dénia, Spain, on July 24, 2022.
- Luca Wiedenmann defeated Adam Moundir 1–6, 6–4, [18–16] in the third round of qualifying at the $15k tournament in Oberhaching, Germany, on February 13, 2023.
- Moritz Schroeter defeated Quinten Kleiboer 6–2, 2–6, [18–16] in the first round of qualifying at the $25k tournament in Oldenzaal, the Netherlands, on August 27, 2023.
- Mikel Martinez defeated Leonid Sheyngezikht 3–6, 7–5, [18–16] in the second round of qualifying at the $15k tournament in Madrid, Spain, on December 4, 2023.
- Magd Eldin defeated Zhao Run-yu 6–3, 3–6, [18–16] in the first round of qualifying at the $15k tournament in Sharm el-Sheikh, Egypt, on January 28, 2024.
- Samuel Brosset defeated Robinson le Meur 6–7^{(5–7)}, 6–3, [18–16] in the first round of qualifying at the $25k tournament in Plaisir, France, on September 8, 2024.
- Mikolaj Lorens defeated Mihnea-Lorin Stefan Turcu 1–6, 6–3, [17–15] in the first round of qualifying at the $15k tournament in Antalya on January 28, 2019.
- Marco Brugnerotto defeated Federico Iannaccone 7–6^{(7–3)}, 4–6, [17–15] in the second round of qualifying at the $15k tournament in Sharm el-Sheikh on March 11, 2019.
- Benjamin Fumi defeated Dustin Goldenberg 6–3, 6–7^{(4–7)}, [17–15] in the second round of qualifying at the $25k tournament in Lagos, Nigeria, on October 8, 2019.
- Noah Thurner defeated Annei Laska 6–4, 4–6, [17–15] in the first round of qualifying at the $15k tournament in Sharm El Sheikh on October 13, 2019.
- Li Yuanfeng defeated Vicente Oliver Moratalla 6–2, 2–6, [17–15] in the second round of qualifying at the $25k tournament in Murcia, Spain, on March 2, 2020.
- Dominik Kellovský defeated Lodewijk Weststrate 6–3, 3–6, [17–15] in the first round of qualifying at the $15k tournament in Heraklion, Greece, on November 1, 2020.
- Luca Castagnola defeated Thiago Cigarran 6–1, 6–7^{(6–8)}, [17–15] in the first round of qualifying at the $15k tournament in Antalya on January 28, 2021.
- Pol Amoros Ramos defeated Carlos López Montagud 6–4, 4–6, [17–15] in the second round of qualifying at the $25k tournament in La Nucia, Spain, on March 15, 2021. López Montagud also features in the men's doubles section below.
- Faisal Qamar defeated Anirudh Chandrasekar 6–4, 3–6, [17–15] in the second round of qualifying at the $15k tournament in Pune, India, on March 22, 2020. Qamar had two match points at 9–7 in the tie-breaker, but lost both. He eventually won on his fifth match point, having saved three from Chandrasekar. Both players also have an entry in the doubles section below.
- Lewie Lane defeated Adam Jones 3–6, 6–1, [17–15] in the first round of qualifying at the $15k tournament in Sharm el-Sheikh on March 28, 2021.
- Luigi Castelletti defeated Matthias Uwe Kask 7–5, 2–6, [17–15] in the second round of qualifying at the $15k tournament in Šibenik, Croatia, on April 19, 2021. Castelletti won on his third match point, having saved five from Kask.
- Gabriel Donev defeated Santiago de la Fuente 7–5, 1–6, [17–15] in the second round of qualifying at the $15k tournament in Cairo on May 3, 2021.
- Alexis Boureau defeated Michele Vianello 6–0, 3–6, [17–15] in the first round of qualifying at the $15kF tournament in Huy, Belgium, on August 20, 2021. Boureau won on his fourth match point, having saved the first of four against him at 8–9.
- Yoan Pérez defeated Nicolas Ancedy 5–7, 6–2, [17–15] in the first round of qualifying at the $15k tournament in Santo Domingo, Dominican Republic, on November 28, 2021.
- Mykhailo Mossur defeated Lior Goldenberg 3–6, 6–3, [17–15] in the third round of qualifying at the $15k tournament in Sharm el-Sheikh on February 15, 2022. Mossur won on his sixth match point, the first three of which came at 9–6. He had to save four match points from Goldenberg, the first of which came at 9–10.
- Stefan Frijanic defeated Gao Qun 6–7^{(5–7)}, 7–6^{(7–4)}, [17–15] in the first round of qualifying at the $15k tournament in Monastir on March 27, 2022.
- Nil Regàs Luis defeated Kuzey Çekirge 3–6, 7–6^{(7–5)}, [17–15] in the third round of qualifying at the $25k tournament in Reus, Spain, on April 5, 2022. Regàs Luis won on his seventh match point, the first of which came at 10–9. He had to save only one match point from Çekirge, at 8–9.
- Alexander Hoogmartens defeated Max Wiskandt 6–2, 1–6, [17–15] in the first round of qualifying at the $25k tournament in Arlon, Belgium, on June 20, 2022. Hoogmartens won on his sixth match point, the first of which came at 10–9. He had to save two match points from Wiskandt, at 8–9 and 14–15.
- Jiri Crouzek defeated Radovan Michalik 6–3, 5–7, [17–15] in the first round of qualifying at the $15k tournament in Bad Waltersdorf, Austria, on August 14, 2022.
- Marcel Hornung defeated Ole Bredschneijder 3–6, 6–3, [17–15] in the first round of qualifying at the $25k tournament in Oldenzaal, The Netherlands, on August 21, 2022.
- Mikhail Gorokhov defeated Giulio Colacioppo 6–2, 1–6, [17–15] in the final round of qualifying at the $15k tournament in Antalya on December 6, 2022. Gorokhov won on his second match point, having saved seven match points from Colacioppo, the first two of which came at 7–9.
- Alessandro Pecci defeated Aloys Van Baal 6–1, 5–7, [17–15] in the second round of qualifying at the $15k tournament in Monastir on December 12, 2022.
- Aliaksandr Bulitski defeated Dominik Reček 6–3, 4–6, [17–15] in the final round of qualifying at the $15k tournament in Nußloch, Germany, on January 23, 2023. Bulitski won on his fourth match point, having saved seven match points from Reček, the first two of which came at 7–9.
- Islam Orynbasar defeated Mykhailo Mossur 6–4, 5–7, [17–15] in the final round of qualifying at the $15k tournament in Aktobe, Kazakhstan, on March 7, 2023. Orynbasar won on his seventh match point, the first three of which came at 9–6. He saved three match points from Mossur, the first of which came at 11–10.
- Paul Barbier Gazeu defeated Valentin Lapalu 6–7^{(4–7)}, 6–2, [17–15] in the first round of qualifying at the $25k tournament in Balma, France, on March 20, 2023. Barbier Gazeu won on his ninth match point, the first two of which came at 9–7. Lapalu was unable to create a single match point.
- Stevan Popovic defeated Tilen Kovac 6–1, 3–6, [17–15] in the first round of qualifying at the $15k tournament in Osijek, Croatia, on April 30, 2023.
- Anthony Genov defeated Tomas Vaise 2–6, 6–4, [17–15] in the second round of qualifying at the $25k tournament in Valldoreix, Spain, on May 8, 2023.
- Victorio Marquiselli defeated Ioannis Xilas 6–2, 3–6, [17–15] in the third round of qualifying at the $15k tournament in Pazardzhik, Bulgaria, on May 22, 2023.
- Savelly Ivanov defeated Phillip Jordan 2–6, 6–4, [17–15] in the second round of qualifying at the $15k tournament in Monastir on July 24, 2023.
- Aleksandar Mihailović defeated Shendrit Deari 4–6, 6–4, [17–15] in the first round of qualifying at the $15k tournament in Osijek, Croatia, on August 7, 2023.
- Konstantin Cucka defeated Nicola Senn 6–4, 6–7^{(5–7)}, [17–15] in the first round of qualifying at the $15k tournament in Eupen, Belgium, on August 7, 2023.
- Peter Nad defeated Zalan Sandor Savay 6–3, 5–7, [17–15] in the first round of qualifying at the $15k tournament in Budapest, Hungary, on September 3, 2023.
- Leo Deflandre defeated Lorenzo Lorusso 6–1, 6–7^{(4–7)}, [17–15] in the final round of qualifying at the $25k tournament in Monastir on November 7, 2023. Deflandre won on his fourth match point, the first of which came at 9–8. He saved four match points from Lorusso, the first of which came at 9–10.
- Daniel Vishnick defeated Ignasi Forcano 0–6, 6–3, [17–15] in the first round of qualifying at the $15k tournament in Monastir on December 10, 2023.
- Tai Sach defeated Kosuke Ogura 7–5, 4–6, [17–15] in the second round of qualifying at the $25k tournament in Traralgon, Australia, on February 19, 2024.
- Vardan Manukyan defeated Jovan Bjelobrk 5–7, 6–3, [17–15] in the first round of qualifying at the $15k tournament in Kuršumlijska Banja, Serbia, on April 24, 2024.
- Juan José Bianchi defeated Reece Falck 6–3, 3–6, [17–15] in the second round of qualifying at the $15k tournament in Santo Domingo, Dominican Republic, on June 10, 2024.
- Adam Jones defeated Joshua Charlton 7–6^{(7–2)}, 1–6, [17–15] in the first round of qualifying at the $15k tournament in Lakewood, United States, on July 1, 2024.
- Pranav Kumar defeated Nicolas Buitrago 6–4, 4–6, [17–15] in the second round of qualifying at the $25k tournament in Arequipa, Peru, on August 19, 2024.
- Alejandro Garcia defeated Luis Garcia Paez 3–6, 6–3, [17–15] in the third round of qualifying at the $15k tournament in Madrid, Spain, on September 10, 2024.

== Men's doubles ==
=== Longest regular tiebreaker ===
- Michael Mortensen and Jan Gunnarson defeated John Frawley and Víctor Pecci 6–4, 6–4, 3–6, 7–6^{(26–24)} in the first round at Wimbledon in 1985.

=== Other long tiebreakers ===
- In the Washington 2015 first round Juan Sebastián Cabal and Robert Farah defeated Austin Krajicek and Nicholas Monroe 7–6^{(25–23)}, 6–3.
- In a quarterfinal of the ITF M15 tournament at Metzingen, Germany, on July 21, 2022, Kevin Hümpfner and Mateo Nicolás Martínez defeated Jan Jermář and Štěpán Pecák 7–6^{(21–19)}, 6–3. They won on their tenth set point, all of which were in the tie-break. They had saved ten against them, the first of which came in the ninth game of the set, followed by three more in the tenth game, one more in the twelfth, and five more in the tie-break.
- In the 2019 Davis Cup Finals Group C round-robin in Madrid, Kevin Krawietz and Andreas Mies (Germany) defeated Leonardo Mayer and Máximo González (Argentina) 6–7^{(4–7)}, 7–6^{(7–2)}, 7–6^{(20–18)}.
- Miguel Angel Alonso and Rafael Alonso De Alba Valdes defeated Joao Victor Couto Loureiro and Eduardo Ribeiro 7–6^{(20–18)}, 6–3 in the first round at the $15k ITF tournament in Huamantla, Mexico, on July 25, 2024.

=== Longest match tie-break ===
- In the Marrakech Challenger 2012 first round, Aliaksandr Bury and Mateusz Kowalczyk defeated Jonathan Dasnières de Veigy and Marc Gicquel 7–6^{(7–4)}, 4–6, [27–25].

=== Other long match tie-breaks ===
- Marcus Daniell and Artem Sitak defeated Taro Daniel and Jordan Kerr 6–7^{(4–7)}, 6–2, [24–22] in the first round of the 2014 Comerica Bank Challenger in Aptos, California, USA.
- In the Estoril Open 2007 first round, Albert Montañés and Rubén Ramírez Hidalgo defeated Simon Aspelin and František Čermák 7–6, 1–6, [23–21].
- In the quarter-final of the ITF M15 tournament at Szczawno, Poland, on September 1, 2023, Mateusz Kulakowski and Olaf Pieczkowski defeated Michal Mikula and Yann Wojcik 1–6, 6–2, [23–21]. They won on their sixth match point, the first at 9–8, having saved eight against them.
- In the quarter-final of the Dobrich Challenger on August 22, 2024, Anthony Genov and Vladyslav Orlov defeated David Pichler and Matej Vocel 6–3, 6–7 ^{(5–7)}, [22–20].
- In the first round of the ITF M15 tournament at Monastir, Tunisia, on September 24, 2024, Mert Alkaya and Mert Ozdemir defeated Niccolo Ciavarella and Daniele Minighini 6–7 ^{(6–8)}, 7–5, [22–20].
- In the final of the ITF M15 tournament at Rancho Santa Fe, California, USA, on June 4, 2022, Alexander Cozbinov and August Holmgren defeated Abraham Asaba and Mitchell Harper 6–4, 6–7 ^{(3–7)}, [21–19]. They won on their fourth match point, having saved ten against them, the first three at 6–9.
- In the first round of the ITF M15 tournament at Weston, Florida, USA, on February 14, 2023, Vasil Kirkov and Bruno Kuzuhara defeated Kyle Kang and Aidan Kim 6–7 ^{(6–8)}, 6–2, [21–19]. They won on their sixth match point, having saved six against them, the first at 10–11.
- In the quarter-final of the ITF M15 tournament at San Gregorio di Catania, Italy, on November 7, 2024, Franco Emanuel Egea and Juan Cruz Martin Manzano defeated Jacopo Bilardo and Gianluca Cadenasso 3–6, 7–6^{(7–5)}, [21–19].
- In the first round of the 2015 Czech Republic F7 Futures in Jablonec nad Nisou, Jan Mertl and Karel Svoboda defeated Lubomir Majsajdr and Dominik Recek 6–4, 3–6, [20–18].
- Marc-Andrea Hüsler and Kamil Majchrzak defeated Lloyd Glasspool and Alex Lawson 6–3, 1–6, [20–18] in the final of the 2020 Hamburg Challenger. The remarkable statistic from the match tie-break was that, after Glasspool and Lawson saved the first two match points against them at 7–9, they were unable to take the lead at any time, meaning that the victory for Hüsler and Majchrzak came on their 12th match point. Glasspool also has an entry later in this section.
- Romain Arneodo and Fabrice Martin defeated Luke Saville and John-Patrick Smith 6–4, 4–6, [20–18] in the first round of the 2022 Geneva Open. They won on their seventh match point, having saved five against them.
- In the first round of the ITF M25 tournament at Padua, Italy, on July 8, 2024, Gianluca Carlini and Giulio Perego defeated Filippo and Umberto Maria Giovannini 6–2, 6–7 ^{(3–7)}, [20–18].
- In the quarter-final of the Granby Challenger on July 18, 2024, Nicolas Mejia and Andres Urrea defeated Clément Chidekh and Luca Sanchez 5–7, 7–6 ^{(7–4)}, [20–18].
- Chase Buchanan and Blaž Rola defeated Mitchell Krueger and Eric Quigley 6–4, 4–6, [19–17] in the final of the 2015 Columbus Challenger. They won on their sixth match point, having saved four against them.
- In the first round of the ITF M15 tournament at Sharm El Sheikh, Egypt, on February 16, 2021, Jonáš Forejtek and David Poljak defeated Anirudh Chandrasekar and Niki Kaliyanda Poonacha 3–6, 6–1, [19–17]. They won on their seventh match point, having saved five against them. Chandrasekar also has an entry in the singles section above.
- In the quarter-finals of the 2022 Open de Pozoblanco, Boris Arias and Federico Zeballos defeated Constantin Bittoun Kouzmine and Brandon Walkin 6–4, 4–6, [19–17]. They won on their sixth match point, having saved four against them.
- In the first round of the ITF M25 tournament at Tainan, Taiwan, on August 23, 2023, Tushar Madan and Digvijay Pratap Singh defeated Yamato Sueoka and Naoki Tajima 6–2, 3–6, [19–17]. They won on their fifth match point, the first having come at 9–8, having saved five against them.
- In the quarter-final of the ITF M15 tournament at Nakhon Si Thammarat, Thailand, on August 31, 2023, Ishaque Eqbal and Faisal Qamar defeated Sun Qian and Tang Sheng 1–6, 7–6 ^{(7–5)}, [19–17]. They won on their fifth match point, the first having come at 10–9, having saved four against them, the first having come at 8–9. Qamar also has an entry in the singles section.
- Boris Arias and Federico Zeballos defeated Sander Arends and Matwé Middelkoop 5–7, 7–6 ^{(10–8)}, [19–17] in the first round of the 2024 Madrid Challenger.
- In the quarter-final of the Almaty Open on October 18, 2024, Nicolas Barrientos and Skander Mansouri defeated Nathaniel Lammons and Jackson Withrow 3–6, 6–3, [19–17].
- In the first round of the ITF M25 tournament at Heraklion, Greece, on November 5, 2024, Menelaos Efstathiou and Eleftherios Neos defeated Christos Antonopoulos and Evangelos Kypriotis 0–6, 6–4, [19–17].
- In the first round of the ITF M15 tournament at Nusa Dua, Indonesia, on December 19, 2024, Md Rifqi Fitriadi and Anthony Susanto defeated Nathan Barki and Christopher Rungkat 1–6, 6–4, [19–17].
- Cleeve Harper and Govind Nanda defeated Andre Ilagan and Colin Sinclair 6–1, 3–6, [18–16] in a quarter-final of the ITF M25 tournament at Tulsa, United States on June 20, 2024.
- In the quarter-final of the 2019 ITF M15 tournament at Santa Marta, Colombia, Ignacio Carou and Agustin Riquelme Coppari defeated John Bernard and Sebastian Murillo 6–4, 4–6, [18–16]. They won on their seventh match point, having saved three against them.
- In the quarter-final tie between Australia and Great Britain in the 2020 ATP Cup, Alex de Minaur and Nick Kyrgios defeated Jamie Murray and Joe Salisbury 3–6, 6–3, [18–16]. They won on their fourth match point, having saved four against them.
- In the final of the 2020 Argentina Open, Marcel Granollers and Horacio Zeballos defeated Guillermo Durán and Juan Ignacio Londero 6–4, 5–7, [18–16]. They won on their sixth match point, having saved three against them.
- In the semifinals of the ITF M15 tournament at Santo Domingo, Dominican Republic, on December 5, 2020, Gonzalo Lama and Antonio Cayetano March defeated Alejandro Mendoza and Federico Zeballos 7–6^{(7–4)}, 3–6, [18–16]. They won on their sixth match point, having saved three against them.
- In the final of the first Antalya Challenger on January 31, 2021, Denys Molchanov and Aleksandr Nedovyesov defeated Luis David Martinez and David Vega Hernández 3–6, 6–4, [18–16]. They won on their fourth match point, having saved six against them.
- In the first round of the Orlando Open on April 13, 2021, Alexander Ritschard and Alex Rybakov defeated Sriram Balaji and Jeevan Nedunchezhiyan 6–7^{(4–7)}, 6–4, [18–16]. They won on just their second match point, the first having been at 9–8, having saved seven against them. Vega Hernández also has an entry in the mixed doubles section below.
- In the semi-final of the Eastbourne International on June 24, 2021, Nikola Mektić and Mate Pavić defeated Lloyd Glasspool and Harri Heliövaara 6–4, 6–7^{(5–7)}, [18–16]. They won on their fourth match point, having saved five against them in the match tie-break, the first of those being at 8–9. This is Glasspool's second entry in this section, after his [18–20] loss noted above.
- In the semi-final of the Salzburg Open on July 9, 2021, Facundo Bagnis and Sergio Galdós defeated Andrés Molteni and Andrea Vavassori 3–6, 7–6^{(7–1)}, [18–16]. They won on their third match point, having saved six against them.
- In the semi-final of the Murcia Open on April 8, 2022, Pedro Cachin and Martín Cuevas defeated Carlos López Montagud and Johan Nikles 6–3, 5–7, [18–16]. They won on their fourth match point, having saved five against them. López Montagud also features in the men's singles section above.
- In the quarter-final of the Mallorca Championships on June 22, 2022, Matthew Ebden and Philipp Oswald defeated Pablo Carreño Busta and Jaume Munar 6–3, 2–6, [18–16]. They won on their fifth match point, having saved four against them.
- In the quarter-final of the ITF M15 tournament at Casablanca, Morocco, on July 7, 2022, Mathys Erhard and Lilian Marmousez defeated Louroi and Mirko Martinez 4–6, 6–3, [18–16]. They won on their seventh match point, having saved two against them.
- In the first round of the Prague Open on August 24, 2022, Sanjar Fayziev and Oleksii Krutykh defeated Oriol Roca Batalla and Timo Stodder 6–4, 6–7^{(5–7)}, [18–16]. They won on their fourth match point, the first having been at 9–8, having saved five against them.
- In the quarter-final of the ITF M25 tournament at Kuršumlijska Banja, Serbia, on May 18, 2023, Guy Den Ouden and Samuel Vincent Ruggeri defeated Rithvik Choudary Bollipalli and Sai Karteek Reddy Ganta 6–4, 3–6, [18–16]. They won on their fifth match point, the first two having been at 9–7, and saved five against them.
- In the quarter-final of the ITF M15 tournament at Frankfurt, Germany, on August 10, 2023, Dominik Boehler and Joel Schwaerzler defeated Juan Ignacio Galarza and Imanol Lopez Morillo 4–6, 6–3, [18–16]. They won on their fifth match point, the first having been at 11–10, and saved four against them.
- In the first round of the ITF M25 tournament at Monastir, Tunisia, on November 14, 2023, James Beaven and Toby Martin defeated Jurriaan Bol and Brian Bozemoj 5–7, 7–5, [18–16]. They won on their fifth match point, the first having been at 11–10, and saved four against them, the first coming at 8–9.
- In the final of the Santo Domingo Challenger on August 17, 2024, Diego Hidalgo and Miguel Angel Reyes-Varela defeated Sriram Balaji and Fernando Romboli 6–7^{(2–7)}, 6–4, [18–16].
- In the first round of the ITF M15 tournament at Madrid, Spain, on September 10, 2024, Boris Butulija and Aryan Lakshmanan defeated Tristan McCormick and Joe Tyler 1–6, 6–1, [18–16].

== Women's singles ==
=== Overall ===
- On February 21, 2017, at the $25 Moscow tournament, Akgul Amanmuradova won a second set tiebreak 22–20 against Anna Zaja. However, she lost the match 6–4, 6–7^{(20–22)}, 7–6^{(7–4)}.

=== Grand Slam events ===
==== Australian Open ====
- Anna Blinkova won a final-set tiebreaker 22–20 in her second round match against Elena Rybakina at the 2024 Australian Open, setting the record for the longest Grand Slam tiebreak in the history of women's singles. The final score was 6–4, 4–6, 7–6^{(22–20)}. Blinkova won on her tenth match point, the first two of which came in the last regular game of the match and the next at 9–7 in the tiebreaker. She saved six match points from Rybakina, the first of which came at 12–11.

==== Wimbledon ====
- Lesia Tsurenko won a final-set tiebreaker over Ana Bogdan at the 2023 tournament. The final score was 4–6, 6–3, 7–6^{(20–18)}.

==== French Open ====
- Denisa Allertová won a first set tiebreak in 2015 against Johanna Konta 19–17. Allertová ultimately won the match 7–6^{(19–17)}, 4–6, 6–2.

==== US Open ====
- Maria Kirilenko won a second-set tiebreaker over Samantha Stosur in 2011, but eventually lost the match 2–6, 7–6^{(17–15)}, 3–6. Stosur went on to win the title.

=== Other long tiebreakers ===
- Emmanuelle Gagliardi defeated Tara Snyder 6–7^{(19–21)}, 6–1, 6–1 at the 1999 Madrid Open.
- Nuria Brancaccio won a first-set tiebreaker 21–19 over Lucie Petruzelová in the first round of qualifying for the Ottava Edizione CMG Tennis Cup, a $15,000 ITF tournament in Trieste, Italy, on August 30, 2020. She won the match 7–6^{(21–19)}, 6–1.
- Andreea Prisăcariu won a first-set tiebreaker 20–18 over Diana Demidova in the third and final round of qualifying for the MTA Open series, a $15,000 ITF tournament in Antalya, Turkey, on March 2, 2021. She won the match 7–6^{(20–18)}, 6–2.
- Ilana Kloss won a first-set tiebreaker 19–17 over Kate Latham in the 1979 Crossley Carpets Trophy, but lost the match 7–6, 6–7, 6–2.
- Luisa Meyer auf der Heide won a first-set tiebreaker 19–17 over Dia Evtimova in the second round of qualifying for the GD Tennis Cup series, another $15k tournament in Antalya, on November 4, 2019. She won the match 7–6^{(19–17)}, 6–1.
- Maddison Inglis won a third-set tiebreaker 19–17 against Rebecca Šramková in the first round of qualifying for the 2020 Australian Open. She won the match 6–3, 0–6, 7–6^{(19–17)}. Note, though, that this was a 10-point tie-breaker because it was in the deciding set. Šramková led 7–4 at what would have been the regular finishing point, and then 8–4, before Inglis won five points in a row to lead 9–8. From there points went with serve until Šramková was broken at 17-17, and Inglis then held serve to win on her sixth match point.
- Yana Karpovich (also known as Yana Mogilnitskaya) won a first-set tiebreaker 18–16 over Linda Ševčíková in the second round of qualifying for a $15k tournament in Antalya, Turkey, on March 28, 2022, and went on to win the match 7–6^{(18–16)}, 6–2.
- Alison Riske won a first-set tiebreaker 18–16 over Dayana Yastremska in the Billie Jean King Cup qualifying round in Asheville, North Carolina, United States, on April 15, 2022, on her eighth set point, the first of which had come at 6–5. She had saved four set points from Yastremska. Riske went on to win the match 7–6^{(18–16)}, 7–5. Yastremska also has an entry in the doubles section below.
- Marie Benoit won a second-set tiebreaker 18–16 over Tena Lukas in the first round of a $25k tournament in Šibenik, Croatia, on October 5, 2022, but Lukas went on to win the match 6–4, 6–7^{(16–18)}, 6–1. Benoit had had two set points at 6–5 in the regular games, and had three more in the tie-break, where she saved six match points.
- Anastasia Myskina won a third-set tiebreaker 17–15 against Vera Zvonareva in the 2004 Acura Classic. She won the match 6–2, 6–7^{(4–7)}, 7–6^{(17–15)}.
- Hsieh Su-wei also won a tiebreaker 17–15 against Lesia Tsurenko in a first round encounter in Miami in 2013. She won the match 6–4, 7–6^{(17–15)}.
- Yanina Wickmayer won a first-set tiebreaker 17–15 against Amra Sadiković in a first round encounter in the 2017 Nürnberger Versicherungscup. Wickmayer eventually won the match 7–6^{(17–15)}, 6–7^{(4–7)}, 6–2.
- Ankita Raina won a second-set tiebreaker 17–15 against Liang En-shuo in a second round encounter at the $60k 2018 Jinan Open. Raina ultimately won the match 3–6, 7–6^{(17–15)}, 6–3.
- Madison Bourguignon won a second-set tiebreaker 17–15 against Natalia Orlova in a first round encounter at the Cancún Tennis Cup, a $15k tournament in Cancún, Mexico, on May 8, 2019. Bourguignon ultimately won the match 3–6, 7–6^{(17–15)}, 4–1 when Orlova retired. This match took 3 hours and 43 minutes, and is the longest in women's tennis which was not played to a finish.
- Angelina Gabueva won a first-set tiebreaker 17–15 over Emily Fanning in the second round of qualifying for the 2019 Lexington Challenger, and went on to win the match 7–6^{(17–15)}, 6–0.
- Veronica Miroshnichenko won a second-set tiebreaker 17–15 over Jacqueline Cabaj Awad in the second round of a $40k ITF tournament in Guadalajara, Mexico, on November 22, 2023, and went on to win the match 4–6, 7–6^{(17–15)}, 6–4. Miroshnichenko won the tie-break on her fifth set point, the first of which came at 8–7, having saved five match points, the first of which came at 6–7.
- Victoria Hu won a first-set tiebreaker 17–15 over Alana Smith in the first round of a $25k ITF tournament in Boca Raton, United States, on April 9, 2024, but Smith went on to win the match 6–7^{(15–17)}, 6–2, 6–3.
- Miriana Tona won a third-set tiebreaker 17–15 over Cadence Brace in the quarter-final of a $25k ITF tournament in Anapoima, Colombia, on May 3, 2024, winning the match 2–6, 6–2, 7–6^{(17–15)}.

=== Longest match tie-break ===
- Daria-Maria Munteanu defeated Ștefana Lazar 6–3, 1–6, [22–20] in the second round of qualifying in the $15k tournament in Curtea de Argeș, Romania, on September 3, 2019. Munteanu had the lead in the tie-break at 9–8, and eventually won on her seventh match point, having saved six from Lazar.

=== Other long match tie-breaks ===
- Veronika Pepelyaeva defeated Alina Silich 6–1, 5–7, [21–19] in the final round of qualifying at the $15k tournament in Antalya, Turkey, on December 17, 2019.
- Dana Shakirova defeated Elena Korokozidi 6–2, 0–6, [21–19] in the first round of qualifying at the $25k tournament in Kazan, Russia, on January 20, 2020. Korokozidi had the first of her seven match points in the tie-breaker at 9–8, but Shakirova eventually won on her fifth match point.
- Emiliia Margolina defeated Lucia Ros Parres 6–3, 5–7, [21–19] in the first round of qualifying at the $15k tournament in Baza, Spain, on October 2, 2022.
- Weronika Foryś defeated Jennifer Rosa Dourado 6–4, 2–6, [20–18] in the first round of qualifying at the $15k tournament in Sharm El Sheikh, Egypt, on February 18, 2019.
- Mina Hodzic defeated Valeriya Strakhova 6–3, 1–6, [20–18] in the second round of qualifying at the Open de Biarritz in France on June 6, 2022.
- Beatrice Lombardo defeated Enola Chiesa 6–1, 3–6, [19–17] in the second round of qualifying at the $15k tournament in Schio, Italy, on July 23, 2019. Chiesa had four match points at 9–5 in the tie-breaker, but lost them all. She had a further six as the tie-breaker progressed before Lombardo won on her third match point.
- Sem Wensveen defeated Sylvie Zund 7–5, 6–7^{(5–7)}, [19–17] in the first round of qualifying at the $15k tournament in Sharm El Sheikh on February 21, 2021.
- Mathilde Dury defeated Fitriani Sabatini 2–6, 6–1, [19–17] in the first round of qualifying at the $15k tournament in Monastir, Tunisia, on May 30, 2021.
- Liubov Demidova defeated Meryem Alexandra Guener 7–5, 2–6, [19–17] in the first round of qualifying at the $15k tournament in Antalya on May 31, 2021.
- Hibah Shaikh defeated Humera Baharmus 4–6, 7–5, [19–17] in the first round of qualifying at the $15k tournament in Monastir on July 11, 2021.
- Ada Piestrzynska defeated Viktoria Veleva 6–4, 6–7^{(5–7)}, [19–17] in the final round of qualifying at the $15k tournament in Antalya on December 6, 2022. Piestrzynska won on her third match point, having saved the first of eight match points from Veleva at 7–9.
- Anastasiya Poplavska defeated Hala Khaled 5–7, 6–2, [18–16] in the second round of qualifying at the $15k tournament in Sharm El Sheikh on April 2, 2019.
- Arabella Koller defeated Demi Tran 6–7^{(3–7)}, 6–3, [18–16] in the final round of qualifying at the $15k tournament in Sharm El Sheikh on November 12, 2019.
- Anna Powaska-Kobylarz defeated Jessica Fowler 0–6, 6–0, [18–16] in the second round of qualifying at the $15k tournament in Heraklion, Greece, on November 18, 2019.
- Elisabeth Iila defeated Océanne Lopez 3–6, 6–3, [18–16] in the second round of qualifying at the $15k tournament in Monastir on November 21, 2022.
- Duru Kuscu defeated Florencia Moron 4–6, 6–4, [18–16] in the first round of qualifying at the $15k tournament in Antalya on November 26, 2023.
- Izabelle Persson defeated Zoe Du Pasquier Jensen 7–5, 3–6, [18–16] in the first round of qualifying at the $25k tournament in Køge, Denmark, on July 28, 2024.
- Yana Morderger defeated Hsieh Yu-chieh 6–7^{(3–7)}, 6–1, [17–15] in the second round of qualifying at the $25k tournament in Sunderland, Great Britain, on April 8, 2019.
- Manca Pislak defeated Paula Arias Manjón 6–4, 5–7, [17–15] in the third round of qualifying at the $25k tournament in Vienna, Austria, on August 26, 2019. Arias Manjón had the first of her six match points in the tie-breaker at 9–8, but Pislak eventually won on her second match point.
- Pauline Demel defeated Liubov Demidova 4–6, 6–1, [17–15] in the first round of qualifying at the $15k tournament in Antalya on November 24, 2019.
- Alana Parnaby defeated Ayumi Koshiishi 2–6, 6–4, [17–15] in the first round of qualifying at the $25k tournament in Perth, Western Australia, on February 23, 2020.
- Marie Villet defeated Andre Lukoslute 7–5, 3–6, [17–15] in the third round of qualifying at the $15k tournament in Monastir on July 6, 2021.
- Eliessa Vanlangendonck defeated Mika Dagan Fruchtman 6–1, 1–6, [17–15] in the third round of qualifying at the $25k tournament in Marks Park, Johannesburg, South Africa, on September 13, 2021. Each player had four match points in the tie-break.
- Mariana Dražić defeated Aurora Zantedeschi 6–2, 2–6, [17–15] in the first round of qualifying at the $25k tournament in Lisbon, Portugal, on September 26, 2021.
- Carlotta Mosso defeated Lucia Hanesova 7–5, 4–6, [17–15] in the first round of qualifying at the $15k tournament in Heraklion on November 7, 2021.
- Moyuka Uchijima defeated Clara Vlasselaer 6–4, 0–6, [17–15] in the first round of qualifying at the $25k tournament in Selva Gardena, Italy, on November 28, 2021. Uchijima had the first five of nine match points in the tie-breaker at 9–4, and had to save three from Vlasselaer before completing the win.
- Dakshata Girishkumar Patel defeated Srinidhi Sridhar 6–2, 0–6, [17–15] in the first round of qualifying at the $15k tournament in Jhajjar, India, on February 6, 2022.
- Makenna Thiel defeated Alexandra Ozerets 6–1, 3–6, [17–15] in the first round of qualifying at the $15k tournament in Lakewood, California, United States, on July 10, 2022.
- Oana Gavrilă defeated Lucía Llinares Domingo 6–2, 4–6, [17–15] in the second round of qualifying at the Open Internacional de San Sebastián in Spain on September 26, 2022. Gavrilă won on her fourth match point, having saved the first of four against her at 7–9.
- Marie Cerezo defeated Jana Otzipka 6–2, 4–6, [17–15] in the first round of qualifying at the $15k tournament in Lousada, Portugal, on November 20, 2022.
- Stefanie Auer defeated Sofia Avataneo 0–6, 6–2, [17–15] in the second round of qualifying at the $15k tournament in Heraklion on March 20, 2023.
- Sarah Tatu defeated Astrid Lew Yan Foon 5–7, 6–4, [17–15] in the second round of qualifying at the $15k tournament in Telde, Canary Islands (Spain), on April 10, 2023.
- Taylor Johnson defeated Reece Carter 4–6, 6–4, [17–15] in the first round of qualifying at the $15k tournament in Los Angeles, California, United States, on June 19, 2023.
- Jana Vanik defeated Olga Golas 2–6, 6–0, [17–15] in the first round of qualifying at the $25k tournament in Leipzig, Germany, on August 6, 2023.

== Women's doubles ==
=== Longest regular tiebreaker ===
- Caroline Dolehide and Irina Khromacheva defeated Estelle Cascino and Nicole Fossa Huergo 6-3, 7-6^{(23–21)} in the first round in the 2026 Copa Colsanitas (Bogotá Open).

=== Other long tiebreakers ===
- * Nicole Pratt and Bryanne Stewart defeated Corina Morariu and Rennae Stubbs 7–6^{(7–5)}, 7–6^{(22–20)} in the first round in the 2006 Amelia Island tournament.
- Manisha Malhotra and Sania Mirza won a 21–19 tiebreaker against Vlada Ekshibarova and Ivanna Israilova in their 2004 Fed Cup Asia-Oceania Zone doubles match. Malhotra and Mirza won 7–6^{(21–19)}, 6–1.
- Rosemary Casals and Kathleen Horvath defeated Sandy Collins and Beth Herr 5–7, 6–1, 7–6^{(20–18)} in the second round of the 1984 Lipton WTA Championships.
- Hsieh Yu-chieh and Ekaterina Yashina defeated Priscilla Hon and Yang Ya-yi 7–6^{(19–17)}, 6–4 in the first round of the Hong Kong Open on October 12, 2023. They won on their sixth set point, the first having come at 5–4, 40–40. There were five more in the tie-breaker (the first coming at 11–10), and they saved five from Hon and Yang, the first of which was at 8–9.
- Manon Bollegraf and Zina Garrison won an 18–16 tiebreaker against Christina Singer and Irina Spîrlea in the 1994 Volkswagen Cup. Singer and Spîrlea won the match 7–6^{(7–2)}, 6–7^{(16–18)}, 6–4.
- Lamis Alhussein Abdel Aziz and Anastasia Zolotareva defeated Pia Lovrič and Saumya Vig 7–6^{(18–16)}, 6–3 in the first round of the $15k tournament in Cairo on December 8, 2020. They won the first set on their fourth set point, having saved seven against them.
- Belinda Bencic and Storm Sanders defeated Dalma Gálfi and Dayana Yastremska 6–2, 6–7^{(7–9)}, 7–6^{(18–16)} in the first round of the Wimbledon Championships, the match being completed on July 1, 2022, after rain had stopped play during the second set on the previous day. Bencic and Sanders won on their sixth match point, the first having been at 11–10, after saving the first of three against them at 8–9. Although this was a 10-point tie-break, being in the final set of the match, neither team had managed a two-point advantage between 2–0 and the time the win was completed. Yastremska also has an entry in the singles section above.
- Katarina Jokić and Taylor Ng defeated Rasheeda McAdoo and Ekaterina Ovcharenko 7–5, 7–6^{(18–16)} in the semi-final of the $25k tournament in Selva Gardena, Italy, on November 30, 2022. They won the match on their fourth match point, having saved five set points against them. The only point by point analysis available is from the ITF live scoring website, but this data is normally archived after a few days.

=== Longest match tie-break ===
- Daria Khomutsianskaya and Evialina Laskevich defeated Diana Marcinkevica and Sapfo Sakellaridi 4–6, 7–6^{(8–6)}, [25–23] in the quarter-final of the $25k ITF tournament in Loulé, Portugal, on October 27, 2023. The tiebreaker lasted 41 minutes, with Khomutsianskaya and Laskevich converting their eighth match point. Marcinkevica and Sakellaridi also had eight in the decider, the first at 9–8, but they had also had a match point at 7–6 in the second set tie-break.

=== Other long match tie-breaks ===
- Merel Hoedt and Alexandra Riley defeated Lauren Cooper and Dakota Fordham 4–6, 6–3, [23–21] in the first round of the $15k SA Spring Open in Johannesburg on September 24, 2019. The tiebreaker lasted 34 minutes, with each pair having eight match points. Cooper and Fordham's first three came at 9–6.
- Bethanie Mattek and Vladimíra Uhlířová defeated Jill Craybas and Michaëlla Krajicek 5–7, 6–4, [21–19] in the first round of the 2008 Bausch & Lomb Championships.
- Gisela Dulko and Flavia Pennetta defeated Edina Gallovits and Barbora Záhlavová-Strýcová 4–6, 6–2, [20–18] in the semifinals of the 2009 Copa Sony Ericsson Colsanitas.
- Ingrid Neel and Maria Sanchez defeated Alexa Guarachi and Erin Routliffe 6–2, 1–6, [20–18] in the quarterfinals of the 2018 Boyd Tinsley Clay Court Classic. Routliffe also defeated Alexa Glatch 7–5, 3–6, [16–14] in singles at Rome, Georgia, United States, on January 25, 2021.
- Janette Husárová and Maria Kirilenko defeated Jill Craybas and Alla Kudryavtseva 6–2, 5–7, [19–17] in the first round of the 2009 Aegon International.
- Jacqueline Cabaj Awad and Melanie Klaffner defeated Sowjanya Bavisetti and Wang Danni 2–6, 6–4, [19–17] in the first round of the $25k Gwalior Women's Championship on November 12, 2019. They won on their seventh match point in the tie-breaker (the first coming at 10–9), having saved three from Bavisetti and Wang, the first of which was at 8–9.
- Līga Dekmeijere (see also entry four below this one) and Maria Kononova (see also entry three below this one) defeated Qavia Lopez and Madison Sieg 6–7^{(0–7)}, 6–3, [19–17] in the final of the $15k tournament in Naples, Florida, USA, on March 12, 2022. They won on their seventh match point in the tie-breaker (the first three coming at 9–6), having saved five from Lopez and Sieg, the first of which was at 9–10.
- Amelia Honer and Carla Pacot defeated Lexington Reed and Daria Smetannikov 0–6, 6–3, [19–17] in the first round of the $15k tournament in Irvine, California, USA, on June 27, 2023. They won on their sixth match point in the tie-breaker (the first coming at 9–8), having saved three from Reed and Smetannikov, the first of which was at 12–13.
- Mao Mushika and Himari Sato defeated Nana Kawagishi and Funa Kozaki 4–6, 6–3, [19–17] in the first round of the $15k tournament in Sapporo, Japan, on August 2, 2023. They won on their third match point in the tie-breaker (the first coming at 11–10), having saved seven from Kawagishi and Kozaki, the first two of which were at 7–9.
- Taisiya Pachkaleva and Nicole Rivkin defeated Maria Kononova (see entry three above this one) and Ava Markham 5–7, 6–1, [19–17] in the quarter-final of the $25k tournament in Austin, United States, on November 16, 2023. They won on their seventh match point in the tie-breaker (the first coming at 10–9), having saved five from Kononova and Markham, the first three of which were from 6–9.
- Aiko Nakamura and Camille Pin defeated Līga Dekmeijere (see entry four above this one) and İpek Şenoğlu 1–6, 6–2, [18–16] in the first round of the 2007 Bank of the West Classic.
- Alisa Kleybanova and Ekaterina Makarova defeated Camille Pin and Aurélie Védy 2–6, 6–4, [18–16] in the quarterfinals of the 2009 Grand Prix SAR La Princesse Lalla Meryem.
- Sara Errani and Roberta Vinci defeated Anna-Lena Grönefeld and Květa Peschke 7–5, 2–6, [18–16] in the quarterfinals of the 2013 Apia International Sydney.
- Georgia Crăciun and Jaqueline Cristian defeated Ekaterina Kazionova and Ekaterina Shalimova 6–4, 4–6, [18–16] in the quarterfinals of the $25k Marat Zverev Memorial Cup in Minsk, Belarus, on June 13, 2019. They won on their third match point in the tie-breaker (the first coming at 10–9), having saved six from Kazionova and Shalimova, the first of which was at 8–9.
- Hiroko Kuwata and Kyoka Okamura defeated Abbie Myers and Belinda Woolcock 5–7, 6–2, [18–16] in the quarterfinals of the $25k Brisbane QTC Tennis International on October 2, 2019.They won on their sixth match point in the tie-breaker (the first coming at 10–9), having saved three from Myers and Woolcock, the first of which was at 8–9.
- Barbora Miklová and Karolína Beránková defeated Alena Fomina and Daria Kruzhkova 3–6, 6–3, [18–16] in the quarterfinals of the $15k Milovice Indoor Open on November 28, 2019. They won on their fifth match point in the tie-breaker (the first coming at 10–9), having saved four from Fomina and Kruzhkova, the first of which was at 8–9.
- Catherine Harrison and Sophia Whittle defeated Allura and Maribella Zamarripa 5–7, 6–3, [18–16] in the first round of the $60k Georgia's Rome Tennis Open in Rome, Georgia, USA, on January 26, 2021. They won on their sixth match point in the tie-breaker (the first coming at 10–9), having saved three from the Zamarripa twins, the first of which was at 8–9.
- Elena Milovanović and Noelia Zeballos Melgar defeated Yuka Hosoki and Nana Kawagishi 3–6, 6–3, [18–16] in the semi-finals of the $15k tournament in Monastir, Tunisia, on September 10, 2021. They won on their fourth match point in the tie-breaker (the first coming at 10–9), having saved five from Hosoki and Kawagishi, the first of which was at 8–9.
- Melany Solange Krywoj and Vanda Vargová defeated Brandelyn and Lauren Fulgenzi 6–3, 1–6, [18–16] in the semi-finals of the $15k tournament in Waco, Texas, United States, on November 18, 2022. They won on their sixth match point in the tie-breaker (the first two coming at 9–7), having saved three from the Fulgenzis, the first of which was at 9–10.
- Roisin Gilheany and Alicia Smith defeated Sravya Shivani Chilakalapudi and Erika Sema 3–6, 6–3, [18–16] in the quarter-finals of the $25k tournament in Cairns, Australia, on October 12, 2023. They won on their fifth match point in the tie-breaker (the first coming at 10–9), having saved five from Chilakalapudi and Sema, the first of which was at 7–9.
- Hiroko Kuwata and Maribella Zamarripa defeated Jessica Failla and Martina Okalova 6–4, 4–6, [18–16] in the semi-finals of the $25k tournament in Saskatoon, Canada, on August 23, 2024.

==== Olympic Games ====
- Xu Yifan and Yang Zhaoxuan defeated Aleksandra Krunić and Nina Stojanović 4–6, 6–4, [18–16] in the first round of the 2020 Tokyo Olympics. They won on their seventh match point, having saved two at 8–9 and 10–11.

== Mixed doubles ==
=== Longest regular tiebreaker ===
- Alicia Barnett and Jonny O'Mara defeated Venus Williams and Jamie Murray 3–6, 6–4, 7–6^{(18–16)} in the second round of the 2022 Wimbledon Championships. Barnett and O'Mara got the first two of their five match points at 9–7. Williams and Murray had five match points of their own, the first at 10–9.
- Taylor Townsend and Jamie Murray defeated Nicole Melichar-Martinez and Jan Zielinski 7–6^{(7–2)}, 7–6^{(15–13)} in the first round of the 2023 Wimbledon Championships. Townsend and Murray had to save four set points in all from Melichar-Martinez and Zielinski, the first two of which came at 4–6, with the first of their six match points coming at 7–6.

=== Other long tiebreakers ===
- Meghann Shaughnessy and James Blake won a 15–13 tiebreak in a win against Daniela Hantuchová and Dominik Hrbatý in the group stage of the 2005 Hopman Cup. Final result was 0–6, 7–6^{(15–13)}, 7–6^{(9–7)}.

=== Longest match tie-break ===
- Jaimee Fourlis and Jason Kubler defeated Nina Stojanović and Mate Pavić 3–6, 6–3, [17–15] in the first round of the 2022 Australian Open. Fourlis and Kubler got the first three of their eight match points at 9–6. Stojanović and Pavić had two match points of their own, at 13–12 and 15–14.
- Raluca Olaru and Franko Škugor defeated Katarina Srebotnik and Michael Venus 4–6, 6–4, [16–14] in the second round of the 2018 US Open. The tiebreaker alone lasted 21 minutes. Olaru and Škugor recovered from 4–8 in the tiebreaker to get the first of their five match points at 9–8. Srebotnik and Venus had two match points of their own, at 10–9 and 14–13.
- Luisa Stefani and Rafael Matos defeated Diane Parry and Harold Mayot 6–3, 6–7,^{(5–7)}, [15–13] in the first round of the 2023 French Open. Stefani and Matos got the first of their three match points at 10–9. Parry and Mayot had four match points of their own, the first two at 9–7.
- Hsieh Su-wei and Nicolas Mahut defeated Jeļena Ostapenko and David Vega Hernández 6–4, 1–6, [14–12] in the first round of the 2023 French Open. Hsieh and Mahut got the first of their two match points at 9–8. Ostapenko and Vega Hernández had three match points of their own, the first at 10–9. Vega Hernández also has an entry in the men's doubles section above.
