= 2023 Engie Open de Biarritz – Singles =

Singles
- 2023 Engie Open de Biarritz

Final
- Champion: (France) Fiona Ferro
- Runner-up: (Turkey) İpek Öz
- Score: 7–5, 6–3

Events
Singles	Doubles
← 2022 ·	Open de Biarritz	· 2024 →

Mina Hodzic was the defending champion of the 2023 Engie Open de Biarritz – Singles tournament but lost in the first round of qualifying.

Fiona Ferro won the title, defeating İpek Öz in straight sets in the final, 7–5, 6–3.

== Seeds ==
1. (France) Diane Parry (second round)
2. (France) Séléna Janicijevic (first round)
3. (Czech Republic) Sára Bejlek (second round)
4. (Hungary) Tímea Babos (semifinals)
5. (Spain) Irene Burillo Escorihuela (second round)
6. (Turkey) İpek Öz (final)
7. (Spain) Carlota Martínez Círez (semifinals)
8. (Burundi) Sada Nahimana (first round)

== Draw ==
=== Key ===
- Q = Qualifier
- WC = Wild card
- LL = Lucky loser
- Alt = Alternate
- SE = Special exempt
- PR = Protected ranking
- ITF = ITF entry
- JE = Junior exempt
- w/o = Walkover
- r = Retired
- d = Defaulted
- SR = Special ranking

=== Finals ===
Semifinals
WC	(France) Fiona Ferro	5	6	6
4	(Hungary) Tímea Babos	7	3	3
7	(Spain) Carlota Martínez Círez	0	4
6	(Turkey) İpek Öz	6	6

Final
WC	(France) Fiona Ferro	7	6
6	(Turkey) İpek Öz	5	3

=== Top half ===
First round
1	(France) D Parry	6	6
(Switzerland) C Perrin	0	4
WC	(France) F Ferro	6	1	7
(Switzerland) J Dürst	3	6	5
(Spain) A Lázaro García	1^{r}
(France) M Rouvroy	1
WC	(France) É Dartron	7^{7}	6
8	(Burundi) S Nahimana	6^{5}	3
4	(Hungary) T Babos	4	6	6
Q	(France) N Radovanovic	6	0	3
(Poland) W Falkowska	6	5	0
Q	(Canada) V Mboko	2	7	6
WC	(France) E Léné	4	2
Q	(France) A Hesse	6	6
Q	(Japan) E Koike	5	4
5	(Spain) I Burillo Escorihuela	7	6

Second round
1	(France) D Parry	5	3
WC	(France) F Ferro	7	6
(France) M Rouvroy	6	6
WC	(France) É Dartron	2	3
4	(Hungary) T Babos	6	2	7^{7}
Q	(Canada) V Mboko	3	6	6^{4}
Q	(France) A Hesse	7	5	6
5	(Spain) I Burillo Escorihuela	5	7	4

Quarterfinals
WC	(France) F Ferro	7^{7}	3	6
(France) M Rouvroy	6^{3}	6	1
4	(Hungary) T Babos	1	6	6
Q	(France) A Hesse	6	3	1

Semifinals
WC	(France) F Ferro	5	6	6
4	(Hungary) T Babos	7	3	3

=== Bottom half ===
First round
7	(Spain) C Martínez Círez	7	6
JE	(Japan) S Saito	5	1
Q	A Ureke	2	2
(Poland) K Kawa	6	6
(Serbia) L Radivojević	7	6
Q	(France) L Petretic	5	4
(Ukraine) V Strakhova	2	5
3	(Czech Republic) S Bejlek	6	7
6	(Turkey) İ Öz	6	6
(Malta) F Curmi	3	3
(Czech Republic) A Sisková	6	6
WC	(France) N Berecoechea	1	0
Q	(France) T Andrianjafitrimo	6	6
(France) L Nguyen Tan	2	0
Q	(France) L Boisson	6	7^{13}
2	(France) S Janicijevic	3	6^{11}

Second round
7	(Spain) C Martínez Círez	7	7^{7}
(Poland) K Kawa	5	6^{5}
(Serbia) L Radivojević	6	6^{8}	7
3	(Czech Republic) S Bejlek	1	7^{10}	5
6	(Turkey) İ Öz	6	2	6
(Czech Republic) A Sisková	2	6	4
Q	(France) T Andrianjafitrimo	3	6	6
Q	(France) L Boisson	6	1	2

Quarterfinals
7	(Spain) C Martínez Círez	6	6
(Serbia) L Radivojević	4	4
6	(Turkey) İ Öz	1	6	6
Q	(France) T Andrianjafitrimo	6	3	2

Semifinals
7	(Spain) C Martínez Círez	0	4
6	(Turkey) İ Öz	6	6
