= 2022 Engie Open de Biarritz – Singles =

Singles
- 2022 Engie Open de Biarritz

Final
- Champion: (Germany) Mina Hodzic
- Runner-up: (France) Lucie Nguyen Tan
- Score: 6–3, 6–3

Events
Singles	Doubles
← 2021 ·	Open de Biarritz	· 2023 →

The 2022 Engie Open de Biarritz – Singles was the singles event of the Open de Biarritz, a professional women's tennis tournament played on outdoor clay courts.

Francesca Jones was the defending champion for the 2022 Singles event of the Open de Biarritz but chose not to participate.

Mina Hodzic won the title, defeating Lucie Nguyen Tan in the final, 6–3, 6–3.

== Seeds ==
1. (France) Chloé Paquet (quarterfinals)
2. (Belgium) Ysaline Bonaventure (second round)
3. Erika Andreeva (semifinals)
4. (Argentina) María Lourdes Carlé (semifinals)
5. (Switzerland) Joanne Züger (second round)
6. (Japan) Yuki Naito (quarterfinals)
7. (Lithuania) Justina Mikulskytė (first round)
8. (Colombia) Emiliana Arango (second round)

== Draw ==
=== Key ===
- Q = Qualifier
- WC = Wild card
- LL = Lucky loser
- Alt = Alternate
- SE = Special exempt
- PR = Protected ranking
- ITF = ITF entry
- JE = Junior exempt
- w/o = Walkover
- r = Retired
- d = Defaulted
- SR = Special ranking

=== Finals ===
Semifinals
Q	(Germany) Mina Hodzic	7^{7}	3	7
4	(Argentina) María Lourdes Carlé	6^{5}	6	5
3	Erika Andreeva	3	0
WC	(France) Lucie Nguyen Tan	6	6

Final
Q	(Germany) Mina Hodzic	6	6
WC	(France) Lucie Nguyen Tan	3	3

=== Top half ===
First round
1	(France) C Paquet	6	7^{7}
WC	M Timofeeva	4	6^{4}
D Shnaider	4	6	3
(Belgium) M Kempen	6	3	6
E Kazionova	7	2	1
Q	(Germany) M Hodzic	5	6	6
(Romania) IL Roșca	6	3	4
8	(Colombia) E Arango	3	6	6
4	(Argentina) ML Carlé	6	6
WC	(France) O Babel	2	1
(Netherlands) E Vedder	6^{4}	7^{7}	4
Q	(France) M Rouvroy	7^{7}	6^{3}	6
(Switzerland) C Perrin	2	6	1
Q	(Germany) E Seibold	6	4	6
Q	(France) A Albié	6	4	6
7	(Lithuania) J Mikulskytė	1	6	4

Second round
1	(France) C Paquet	4	6	7
(Belgium) M Kempen	6	3	5
Q	(Germany) M Hodzic	6	6
8	(Colombia) E Arango	3	2
4	(Argentina) ML Carlé	7^{7}	6
Q	(France) M Rouvroy	6^{2}	4
Q	(Germany) E Seibold	2	1
Q	(France) A Albié	6	6

Quarterfinals
1	(France) C Paquet	6^{2}	6	6^{4}
Q	(Germany) M Hodzic	7^{7}	4	7^{7}
4	(Argentina) ML Carlé	6	6
Q	(France) A Albié	4	2

Semifinals
Q	(Germany) M Hodzic	7^{7}	3	7
4	(Argentina) ML Carlé	6^{5}	6	5

=== Bottom half ===
First round
6	(Japan) Y Naito	4	7	6
WC	(France) M Partaud	6	5	2
Q	(Belgium) L Salden	3	3
(France) A Ramé	6	6
(France) S Janicijevic	6	6
(Germany) S Wagner	4	1
Q	(France) J Belgraver	2	0
3	E Andreeva	6	6
5	(Switzerland) J Züger	6	6
(Spain) M Bassols Ribera	1	3
Q	(France) S Cakarevic	7^{9}	3	4
(Kazakhstan) A Danilina	6^{7}	6	6
Q	(Netherlands) M Hoedt	1	6	3
WC	(France) L Nguyen Tan	6	3	6
(Belgium) M Benoît	6	3	3
2	(Belgium) Y Bonaventure	2	6	6

Second round
6	(Japan) Y Naito	7	6
(France) A Ramé	5	0
(France) S Janicijevic	0	1
3	E Andreeva	6	6
5	(Switzerland) J Züger	6	6^{7}	4
(Kazakhstan) A Danilina	4	7^{9}	6
WC	(France) L Nguyen Tan	5	6	6
2	(Belgium) Y Bonaventure	7	3	1

Quarterfinals
6	(Japan) Y Naito	2	6^{4}
3	E Andreeva	6	7^{7}
(Kazakhstan) A Danilina	3	4
WC	(France) L Nguyen Tan	6	6

Semifinals
3	E Andreeva	3	0
WC	(France) L Nguyen Tan	6	6
