= 2021 Engie Open de Biarritz =

Tennis tournament

- Date: 12–18 July 2021
- Edition: 18th
- Category: ITF Women's World Tennis Tour
- Prize money: $60,000
- Surface: Clay
- Location: Biarritz, France

Champions

Singles
- (United Kingdom) Francesca Jones

Doubles
- (Russia) Oksana Selekhmeteva / (Latvia) Daniela Vismane
← 2019 ·	Open de Biarritz	· 2022 →

The 2021 Engie Open de Biarritz was the eighteenth edition of the Engie Open de Biarritz, a professional women's tennis tournament played on outdoor clay courts. The 2021 edition of the tournament was part of the 2021 ITF Women's World Tennis Tour. It took place in Biarritz, France from 12 to 18 July 2021.

Viktoriya Tomova, the defending champion from the previous edition of the tournament, did not participate in the tournament in the 2021 edition.

== Singles main-draw entrants ==
=== Seeds ===
Country	Player	Rank^{1}	Seed
GBR	Francesca Jones	211	1
FRA	Tessah Andrianjafitrimo	212	2
CHI	Daniela Seguel	215	3
FRA	Amandine Hesse	226	4
MEX	Ana Sofía Sánchez	248	5
NED	Richèl Hogenkamp	249	6
FRA	Chloé Paquet	255	7
BUL	Elitsa Kostova	266	8

- ^{1} Rankings are as of 28 June 2021.

=== Other entrants ===
The following players received wildcards into the singles main draw:

- (France) Loïs Boisson
- (France) Séléna Janicijevic
- (France) Margaux Rouvroy
- (France) Léa Tholey

The following player received entry using a protected ranking:

- (United States) Louisa Chirico

The following player received entry using a junior exempt:

- (United States) Emma Navarro

The following players received entry from the qualifying draw:

- (United Kingdom) Amanda Carreras
- (France) Estelle Cascino
- (Germany) Anna Gabric
- (Chinese Taipei) Joanna Garland
- (France) Léolia Jeanjean
- (Italy) Tatiana Pieri
- (France) Alice Robbe
- (Russia) Oksana Selekhmeteva

== Champions ==
=== Singles ===
- (United Kingdom) Francesca Jones def. (Russia) Oksana Selekhmeteva, 6–4, 7–6^{(7–4)}

=== Doubles ===
- (Russia) Oksana Selekhmeteva / (Latvia) Daniela Vismane def. (United Kingdom) Sarah Beth Grey / (Belgium) Magali Kempen, 6–3, 7–6^{(7–5)}
