= 2021 Engie Open de Biarritz – Singles =

Singles
- 2021 Engie Open de Biarritz

Final
- Champion: (United Kingdom) Francesca Jones
- Runner-up: (Russia) Oksana Selekhmeteva
- Score: 6–4, 7–6^{(7–4)}

Events
Singles	Doubles
← 2019 ·	Open de Biarritz	· 2022 →

The 2021 Engie Open de Biarritz – Singles was the singles event in the 18th edition of the Engie Open de Biarritz, a professional women's tennis tournament played on outdoor clay courts.

Viktoriya Tomova was the defending champion, having won the previous edition in 2019, however she chose to compete in Budapest instead.

Francesca Jones won the title, defeating Oksana Selekhmeteva in the final, 6–4, 7–6^{(7–4)}.

== Seeds ==
1. (United Kingdom) Francesca Jones (champion)
2. (France) Tessah Andrianjafitrimo (first round)
3. (Chile) Daniela Seguel (first round)
4. (France) Amandine Hesse (second round)
5. (Mexico) Ana Sofía Sánchez (first round)
6. (Netherlands) Richèl Hogenkamp (second round)
7. (France) Chloé Paquet (second round)
8. (Bulgaria) Elitsa Kostova (first round)

== Draw ==
=== Key ===
- Q = Qualifier
- WC = Wild card
- LL = Lucky loser
- Alt = Alternate
- SE = Special exempt
- PR = Protected ranking
- ITF = ITF entry
- JE = Junior exempt
- w/o = Walkover
- r = Retired
- d = Defaulted
- SR = Special ranking

=== Finals ===
Semifinals
1	(United Kingdom) Francesca Jones	6	6
(Germany) Stephanie Wagner	4	1
(Italy) Lucrezia Stefanini	3	5
Q	(Russia) Oksana Selekhmeteva	6	7

Final
1	(United Kingdom) Francesca Jones	6	7^{7}
Q	(Russia) Oksana Selekhmeteva	4	6^{4}

=== Top half ===
First round
1	(United Kingdom) F Jones	6	6
Q	(United Kingdom) A Carreras	2	4
Q	(Germany) A Gabric	6	3	3
WC	(France) M Rouvroy	4	6	6
(France) M Yerolymos	6	6
Q	(France) A Robbe	4	4
(Netherlands) A Hartono	6	6
5	(Mexico) AS Sánchez	0	2
3	(Chile) D Seguel	1	1
Q	(Chinese Taipei) J Garland	6	6
(Germany) S Wagner	6	6
(United States) K Stewart	0	1
WC	(France) L Tholey	2	1
Q	(France) L Jeanjean	6	6
JE	(United States) E Navarro	4	3
6	(Netherlands) R Hogenkamp	6	6

Second round
1	(United Kingdom) F Jones	7^{13}	6
WC	(France) M Rouvroy	6^{11}	0
(France) M Yerolymos	2	3
(Netherlands) A Hartono	6	6
Q	(Chinese Taipei) J Garland	1	2
(Germany) S Wagner	6	6
Q	(France) L Jeanjean	6	6
6	(Netherlands) R Hogenkamp	2	4

Quarterfinals
1	(United Kingdom) F Jones	6	6
(Netherlands) A Hartono	4	1
(Germany) S Wagner	6	6
Q	(France) L Jeanjean	2	4

Semifinals
1	(United Kingdom) F Jones	6	6
(Germany) S Wagner	4	1

=== Bottom half ===
First round
7	(France) C Paquet	6	6
WC	(France) L Boisson	4	2
(France) D Parry	1	4
(Italy) L Stefanini	6	6
PR	(United States) L Chirico	6	6^{9}	4
(Australia) S Mendez	1	7^{11}	6
(Spain) G Maristany	3	5
4	(France) A Hesse	6	7
8	(Bulgaria) E Kostova	4	3
Q	(France) E Cascino	6	6
Q	(Italy) T Pieri	1	6	0
(Latvia) D Vismane	6	4	6
WC	(France) S Janicijevic	5	1
Q	(Russia) O Selekhmeteva	7	6
(France) A Ramé	4	6	6
2	(France) T Andrianjafitrimo	6	4	4

Second round
7	(France) C Paquet	3	6	6^{2}
(Italy) L Stefanini	6	3	7^{7}
(Australia) S Mendez	6	3	6
4	(France) A Hesse	4	6	4
Q	(France) E Cascino	3	3
(Latvia) D Vismane	6	6
Q	(Russia) O Selekhmeteva	6	7^{7}
(France) A Ramé	1	6^{4}

Quarterfinals
(Italy) L Stefanini	4	6	7
(Australia) S Mendez	6	3	5
(Latvia) D Vismane	1	4
Q	(Russia) O Selekhmeteva	6	6

Semifinals
(Italy) L Stefanini	3	5
Q	(Russia) O Selekhmeteva	6	7
