= 2023 Engie Open de Biarritz – Doubles =

Doubles
- 2023 Engie Open de Biarritz

Final
- Champions: (Poland) Weronika Falkowska (Poland) Katarzyna Kawa
- Runners-up: (Switzerland) Conny Perrin (Czech Republic) Anna Sisková
- Score: 7–6^{(7–2)}, 7–5

Events
Singles	Doubles
← 2022 ·	Open de Biarritz	· 2024 →

The 2023 Engie Open de Biarritz – Doubles was the doubles event of the Open de Biarritz, a professional women's tennis tournament played on outdoor clay courts.

Anna Danilina and Valeriya Strakhova were the defending champions but Danilina chose not to participate. Strakhova partnered alongside Isabelle Haverlag but lost in the semifinals to the eventual champions Weronika Falkowska and Katarzyna Kawa.

Falkowska and Kawa won the title, defeating Conny Perrin and Anna Sisková in the final, 7–6^{(7–2)}, 7–5.

== Seeds ==
1. (Poland) Weronika Falkowska / (Poland) Katarzyna Kawa (champions)
2. (United States) Quinn Gleason / (France) Elixane Lechemia (semifinals)
3. (Netherlands) Isabelle Haverlag / (Ukraine) Valeriya Strakhova (semifinals)
4. (Switzerland) Conny Perrin / (Czech Republic) Anna Sisková (final)

== Draw ==
=== Key ===
- Q = Qualifier
- WC = Wild card
- LL = Lucky loser
- Alt = Alternate
- SE = Special exempt
- PR = Protected ranking
- ITF = ITF entry
- JE = Junior exempt
- w/o = Walkover
- r = Retired
- d = Defaulted
- SR = Special ranking

First round
1	(Poland) W Falkowska (Poland) K Kawa	6	7
WC	(France) T Andrianjafitrimo (France) F Ferro	2	5
(Malta) F Curmi (Algeria) I Ibbou	4	6	[10]
(Burundi) S Nahimana (Turkey) İ Öz	6	3	[4]
3	(Netherlands) I Haverlag (Ukraine) V Strakhova	6^{8}	6	[10]
(France) M Partaud (Serbia) L Radivojević	7^{10}	3	[7]
WC	(France) P Dore (France) C Moga	3	6	[6]
(Japan) N Sato (Bosnia and Herzegovina) A Wagner	6	4	[10]
(France) É Dartron (France) L Nguyen Tan	2	6	[10]
(Spain) I Burillo Escorihuela (France) A Hesse	6	0	[5]
(Switzerland) J Dürst (France) M Rouvroy	0	4
4	(Switzerland) C Perrin (Czech Republic) A Sisková	6	6
(Canada) K Cross (Canada) V Mboko	7	7
WC	(France) V Muntean; A Ureke	5	5
(Indonesia) J Rompies (India) P Thombare	4	4
2	(United States) Q Gleason (France) E Lechemia	6	6

Quarterfinals
1	(Poland) W Falkowska (Poland) K Kawa	6	6
(Malta) F Curmi (Algeria) I Ibbou	2	1
3	(Netherlands) I Haverlag (Ukraine) V Strakhova	6	6
(Japan) N Sato (Bosnia and Herzegovina) A Wagner	3	2
(France) É Dartron (France) L Nguyen Tan	4	6^{5}
4	(Switzerland) C Perrin (Czech Republic) A Sisková	6	7^{7}
(Canada) K Cross (Canada) V Mboko	2	3
2	(United States) Q Gleason (France) E Lechemia	6	6

Semifinals
1	(Poland) W Falkowska (Poland) K Kawa	6	1	[11]
3	(Netherlands) I Haverlag (Ukraine) V Strakhova	3	6	[9]
4	(Switzerland) C Perrin (Czech Republic) A Sisková	6	0	[10]
2	(United States) Q Gleason (France) E Lechemia	3	6	[7]

Final
1	(Poland) W Falkowska (Poland) K Kawa	7^{7}	7
4	(Switzerland) C Perrin (Czech Republic) A Sisková	6^{2}	5
