= 2021 Engie Open de Biarritz – Doubles =

Doubles
- 2021 Engie Open de Biarritz

Final
- Champions: (Russia) Oksana Selekhmeteva (Latvia) Daniela Vismane
- Runners-up: (United Kingdom) Sarah Beth Grey (Belgium) Magali Kempen
- Score: 6–3, 7–6^{(7–5)}

Events
Singles	Doubles
← 2019 ·	Open de Biarritz	· 2022 →

Manon Arcangioli and Kimberley Zimmermann were the defending champions for the 2021 Engie Open de Biarritz, having won the previous edition in 2019. However, both players chose not to participate in the 2021 edition of the women's tennis tournament played on outdoor clay courts in Biarritz, France.

Oksana Selekhmeteva and Daniela Vismane won the title, defeating Sarah Beth Grey and Magali Kempen in the final, 6–3, 7–6^{(7–5)}.

== Seeds ==
1. (Mexico) Ana Sofía Sánchez / (Chile) Daniela Seguel (quarterfinals)
2. (United Kingdom) Sarah Beth Grey / (Belgium) Magali Kempen (final)
3. (France) Estelle Cascino / (Bulgaria) Elitsa Kostova (quarterfinals)
4. (Australia) Seone Mendez / (United States) Katerina Stewart (semifinals)

== Draw ==
=== Key ===
- Q = Qualifier
- WC = Wild card
- LL = Lucky loser
- Alt = Alternate
- SE = Special exempt
- PR = Protected ranking
- ITF = ITF entry
- JE = Junior exempt
- w/o = Walkover
- r = Retired
- d = Defaulted
- SR = Special ranking

=== Draw ===
First round
(Switzerland) L Michel (Australia) TN Smith	6^{3}	1
(Netherlands) I Haverlag (United States) E Navarro	7^{7}	6
(Russia) O Selekhmeteva (Latvia) D Vismane	6	6
(France) S Biolay (France) M Rouvroy	1	2
(Switzerland) J Dürst (Germany) A Gabric	6	7
(Ukraine) M Kostiuk (France) N Mercadier	0	5
(France) S Cakarevic (France) A Ramé	6	0
(France) M Bougrat (France) I Ramialison	1	0^{r}

Quarterfinals
1	(Mexico) AS Sánchez (Chile) D Seguel	3	4
(Netherlands) I Haverlag (United States) E Navarro	6	6
3	(France) E Cascino (Bulgaria) E Kostova	4	6	[4]
(Russia) O Selekhmeteva (Latvia) D Vismane	6	4	[10]
(Switzerland) J Dürst (Germany) A Gabric	0	2
4	(Australia) S Mendez (United States) K Stewart	6	6
(France) S Cakarevic (France) A Ramé	0	6^{6}
2	(United Kingdom) SB Grey (Belgium) M Kempen	6	7^{8}

Semifinals
(Netherlands) I Haverlag (United States) E Navarro	6	1	[5]
(Russia) O Selekhmeteva (Latvia) D Vismane	4	6	[10]
4	(Australia) S Mendez (United States) K Stewart	7	4	[7]
2	(United Kingdom) SB Grey (Belgium) M Kempen	5	6	[10]

Final
(Russia) O Selekhmeteva (Latvia) D Vismane	6	7^{7}
2	(United Kingdom) SB Grey (Belgium) M Kempen	3	6^{5}
