= 2023 Engie Open de Biarritz =

Tennis tournament

- Date: 12–18 June 2023
- Edition: 20th
- Category: ITF Women's World Tennis Tour
- Prize money: $60,000
- Surface: Clay / Outdoor
- Location: Biarritz, France

Champions

Singles
- (France) Fiona Ferro

Doubles
- (Poland) Weronika Falkowska / (Poland) Katarzyna Kawa
← 2022 ·	Open de Biarritz	· 2024 →

The 2023 Engie Open de Biarritz was a professional tennis tournament played on outdoor clay courts, in Biarritz, France, from 12 to 18 June 2023. It was the twentieth edition of the tournament, which was part of the 2023 ITF Women's World Tennis Tour.

== Champions ==
=== Singles ===
- (France) Fiona Ferro def. (Turkey) İpek Öz, 7–5, 6–3

=== Doubles ===
- (Poland) Weronika Falkowska / (Poland) Katarzyna Kawa def. (Switzerland) Conny Perrin / (Czech Republic) Anna Sisková, 7–6^{(7–2)}, 7–5

== Singles main draw entrants ==
=== Seeds ===
Country	Player	Rank	Seed
FRA	Diane Parry	79	1
FRA	Séléna Janicijevic	179	2
CZE	Sára Bejlek	182	3
HUN	Tímea Babos	211	4
ESP	Irene Burillo Escorihuela	244	5
TUR	İpek Öz	246	6
ESP	Carlota Martínez Círez	251	7
BDI	Sada Nahimana	261	8

- Rankings are as of 29 May 2023.

=== Other entrants ===
The following players received wildcards into the singles main draw:

- (France) Nahia Berecoechea
- (France) Émeline Dartron
- (France) Fiona Ferro
- (France) Emma Léné

The following players received entry into the singles main draw using a junior exempt:

- (Japan) Sara Saito

The following players received entry from the qualifying draw:

- (France) Tessah Andrianjafitrimo
- (France) Loïs Boisson
- (France) Amandine Hesse
- (Japan) Ena Koike
- (Canada) Victoria Mboko
- (France) Laïa Petretic
- (France) Nina Radovanovic
- Anna Ureke
