= 2019 Engie Open de Biarritz – Doubles =

Doubles
- 2019 Engie Open de Biarritz

Final
- Champions: (France) Manon Arcangioli (Belgium) Kimberley Zimmermann
- Runners-up: (Mexico) Victoria Rodríguez (Romania) Ioana Loredana Roșca
- Score: 2–6, 6–3, [10–6]

Events
Singles	Doubles
← 2018 ·	Open de Biarritz	· 2021 →

Irina Bara and Valentina Ivakhnenko were the defending champions for the 2019 Engie Open de Biarritz – Doubles, but both players chose not to participate.

Manon Arcangioli and Kimberley Zimmermann won the title, defeating Victoria Rodríguez and Ioana Loredana Roșca in the final, 2–6, 6–3, [10–6].

The tournament was held in Biarritz, France from 15 to 21 July 2019.

== Seeds ==
1. (Spain) Georgina García Pérez / (Hungary) Fanny Stollár (quarterfinals, withdrew)
2. (Montenegro) Danka Kovinić / (Netherlands) Bibiane Schoofs (quarterfinals)
3. (France) Manon Arcangioli / (Belgium) Kimberley Zimmermann (champions)
4. (Mexico) Ana Sofía Sánchez / (Italy) Gaia Sanesi (quarterfinals)

== Draw ==
=== Key ===
- Q = Qualifier
- WC = Wild card
- LL = Lucky loser
- Alt = Alternate
- SE = Special exempt
- PR = Protected ranking
- ITF = ITF entry
- JE = Junior exempt
- w/o = Walkover
- r = Retired
- d = Defaulted
- SR = Special ranking

=== Draw ===
First round
(France) A Devaux (France) E Renard	w/o
(Brazil) G Cé (Brazil) T Pereira
(France) R Azziz (France) M Dury	3	7^{7}	[10]
(France) J Bousseau (France) N Mercadier	6	6^{4}	[4]
(Mexico) V Rodríguez (Romania) IL Roșca	6	6
(France) L Bencheikh (France) S Janicijevic	2	3
(France) S Cakarevic (France) M Yerolymos	6	7^{8}
(Italy) C Ferrando (Georgia (country)) S Shapatava	4	6^{6}

Quarterfinals
1	(Spain) G García Pérez (Hungary) F Stollár
(France) A Devaux (France) E Renard	w/o
3	(France) M Arcangioli (Belgium) K Zimmermann	6	6
(France) R Azziz (France) M Dury	0	4
(Mexico) V Rodríguez (Romania) IL Roșca	6	6
4	(Mexico) AS Sánchez (Italy) G Sanesi	0	3
(France) S Cakarevic (France) M Yerolymos	6	7
2	(Montenegro) D Kovinić (Netherlands) B Schoofs	4	5

Semifinals
(France) A Devaux (France) E Renard	0	0
3	(France) M Arcangioli (Belgium) K Zimmermann	6	6
(Mexico) V Rodríguez (Romania) IL Roșca	6	6
(France) S Cakarevic (France) M Yerolymos	1	1

Final
3	(France) M Arcangioli (Belgium) K Zimmermann	2	6	[10]
(Mexico) V Rodríguez (Romania) IL Roșca	6	3	[6]
