= 2019 Engie Open de Biarritz – Singles =

Singles
- 2019 Engie Open de Biarritz

Final
- Champion: (Bulgaria) Viktoriya Tomova
- Runner-up: (Montenegro) Danka Kovinić
- Score: 6–2, 5–7, 7–5

Events
Singles	Doubles
← 2018 ·	Open de Biarritz	· 2021 →

Tamara Korpatsch was the defending champion for the 2019 Engie Open de Biarritz – Singles, but chose to participate in the 2019 Ladies Open Lausanne instead.

Viktoriya Tomova won the title, defeating Danka Kovinić in the final, 6–2, 5–7, 7–5.

The tournament was held in Biarritz, France from 15 to 21 July 2019.

== Seeds ==
1. (Paraguay) Verónica Cepede Royg (semifinals)
2. (Netherlands) Bibiane Schoofs (quarterfinals)
3. (Montenegro) Danka Kovinić (final)
4. (Bulgaria) Viktoriya Tomova (champion)
5. (France) Jessika Ponchet (semifinals)
6. (Czech Republic) Anastasia Zarycká (quarterfinals)
7. (Bulgaria) Elitsa Kostova (quarterfinals)
8. (Spain) Georgina García Pérez (first round)

== Draw ==
=== Key ===
- Q = Qualifier
- WC = Wild card
- LL = Lucky loser
- Alt = Alternate
- SE = Special exempt
- PR = Protected ranking
- ITF = ITF entry
- JE = Junior exempt
- w/o = Walkover
- r = Retired
- d = Defaulted
- SR = Special ranking

=== Finals ===
Semifinals
1	(Paraguay) Verónica Cepede Royg	6	4	0
4	(Bulgaria) Viktoriya Tomova	2	6	6
3	(Montenegro) Danka Kovinić	3	6	6
5	(France) Jessika Ponchet	6	1	3

Final
4	(Bulgaria) Viktoriya Tomova	6	5	7
3	(Montenegro) Danka Kovinić	2	7	5

=== Top half ===
First round
1	(Paraguay) V Cepede Royg	6	6
(France) A Albié	4	3
(France) T Andrianjafitrimo	1	4
(France) M Yerolymos	6	6
WC	(France) S Janicijevic	5	6	5
Q	(Georgia (country)) S Shapatava	7	3	7
(Hungary) F Stollár	3	1
7	(Bulgaria) E Kostova	6	6
4	(Bulgaria) V Tomova	6	6
Q	(Romania) IL Roșca	0	3
(Brazil) G Cé	6	6
(France) H Tan	3	2
(Belgium) K Zimmermann	4	7	3
(Spain) O Sáez Larra	6	5	6
(Italy) J Pieri	0	2
6	(Czech Republic) A Zarycká	6	6

Second round
1	(Paraguay) V Cepede Royg	6	6^{1}	6
(France) M Yerolymos	1	7^{7}	2
Q	(Georgia (country)) S Shapatava	4	1
7	(Bulgaria) E Kostova	6	6
4	(Bulgaria) V Tomova	6	6
(Brazil) G Cé	1	4
(Spain) O Sáez Larra	3	3
6	(Czech Republic) A Zarycká	6	6

Quarterfinals
1	(Paraguay) V Cepede Royg	6	6^{6}	6
7	(Bulgaria) E Kostova	2	7^{8}	1
4	(Bulgaria) V Tomova	4	6	7^{7}
6	(Czech Republic) A Zarycká	6	4	6^{5}

Semifinals
1	(Paraguay) V Cepede Royg	6	4	0
4	(Bulgaria) V Tomova	2	6	6

=== Bottom half ===
First round
8	(Spain) G García Pérez	3	5
Q	(France) D Parry	6	7
Q	(France) I Ramialison	7^{8}	7
WC	(France) S Cakarevic	6^{6}	5
(France) A Hesse	6^{4}	7	6^{4}
(Argentina) N Podoroska	7^{7}	5	7^{7}
Q	(Mexico) V Rodríguez	1	6	4
3	(Montenegro) D Kovinić	6	4	6
5	(France) J Ponchet	7^{7}	7
(Germany) S Wagner	6^{3}	5
WC	(France) A Lim	6	6
Q	(France) K Le Bihan	2	4
(Italy) G Sanesi	6	6
WC	(France) L Bencheikh	2	4
Q	(Spain) L Cortez Llorca	2	1
2	(Netherlands) B Schoofs	6	6

Second round
Q	(France) D Parry	4	3
Q	(France) I Ramialison	6	6
(Argentina) N Podoroska	2	6	3
3	(Montenegro) D Kovinić	6	0	6
5	(France) J Ponchet	6	7^{7}
WC	(France) A Lim	3	6^{5}
(Italy) G Sanesi	6^{1}	0
2	(Netherlands) B Schoofs	7^{7}	6

Quarterfinals
Q	(France) I Ramialison	6^{3}	1
3	(Montenegro) D Kovinić	7^{7}	6
5	(France) J Ponchet	7	6
2	(Netherlands) B Schoofs	5	2

Semifinals
3	(Montenegro) D Kovinić	3	6	6
5	(France) J Ponchet	6	1	3
