= 2019 Engie Open de Biarritz =

- Date: 15–21 July 2019
- Edition: 17th
- Category: ITF Women's World Tennis Tour
- Prize money: $80,000
- Surface: Clay
- Location: Biarritz, France

Champions

Singles
- (Bulgaria) Viktoriya Tomova

Doubles
- (France) Manon Arcangioli / (Belgium) Kimberley Zimmermann
← 2018 ·	Open de Biarritz	· 2021 →

The 2019 Engie Open de Biarritz was the 17th edition of the Engie Open de Biarritz, a professional women's tennis tournament played on outdoor clay courts.

The 2019 edition of the tournament was part of the 2019 ITF Women's World Tennis Tour. It took place in Biarritz, France between 15 and 21 July 2019.

== Singles main-draw entrants ==
=== Seeds ===
Country	Player	Rank^{1}	Seed
PAR	Verónica Cepede Royg	154	1
NED	Bibiane Schoofs	158	2
MNE	Danka Kovinić	162	3
BUL	Viktoriya Tomova	177	4
FRA	Jessika Ponchet	192	5
CZE	Anastasia Zarycká	206	6
BUL	Elitsa Kostova	220	7
ESP	Georgina García Pérez	227	8

- ^{1} Rankings are as of 1 July 2019.

=== Other entrants ===
The following players received wildcards into the singles main draw:

- (France) Loudmilla Bencheikh
- (France) Sara Cakarevic
- (France) Séléna Janicijevic
- (France) Alizé Lim

The following players received entry from the qualifying draw:

- (Spain) Lucía Cortez Llorca
- (France) Kélia Le Bihan
- (France) Diane Parry
- (France) Irina Ramialison
- (Mexico) Victoria Rodríguez
- (Romania) Ioana Loredana Roșca
- (Italy) Gaia Sanesi
- (Georgia (country)) Sofia Shapatava

== Champions ==
=== Singles ===
- (Bulgaria) Viktoriya Tomova def. (Montenegro) Danka Kovinić, 6–2, 5–7, 7–5

=== Doubles ===
- (France) Manon Arcangioli / (Belgium) Kimberley Zimmermann def. (Mexico) Victoria Rodríguez / (Romania) Ioana Loredana Roșca, 2–6, 6–3, [10–6]
