= Lucie Nguyen Tan =

French tennis player (born 2003)

- Country (sports): France
- Born: May 30, 2003 (age 23) Paris, France
- Plays: Right (two-handed backhand)
- Prize money: $97,388

Singles
- Career record: 168–163
- Highest ranking: No. 366 (October 17, 2022)
- Current ranking: No. 425 (July 20, 2026)

Doubles
- Career record: 85–76
- Highest ranking: No. 371 (July 20, 2026)
- Current ranking: No. 371 (July 20, 2026)
- Last updated on: July 26, 2026.

Lucie Nguyen Tan (born May 30, 2003) is a French tennis player. She has a career-high doubles ranking by the WTA of No. 371, achieved on 20 July 2026.

== Early life ==
Nguyen Tan is of Vietnamese descent was born in Paris, France in 2003. She began playing tennis at the age of three. Her favorite shot is the forehand, and her idol is Roger Federer. She played for the Tennis Club du 16e.

== Career ==
In March 2022, she won the first singles title of her career by defeating German player Nicole Rivkin in the final of the ITF W15 event held in Amiens, France. She also won the doubles title alongside her partner, Océane Babel.

In June 2024, she became the champion at the ITF W15 event held in Madrid, Spain, by defeating Swiss player Alina Granwehr in straight sets in the final.

In October 2025, she won the doubles title with her partner, Spanish player Lucía Cortez Llorca, at the ITF W50 event held in Cherbourg-en-Cotentin, France.

In July 2026, she won the doubles title with her Greek partner, Sapfo Sakellaridi, at the ITF W50 AHG Cup held in Horb, Germany. They became champions by defeating the South Korean duo of Back Da-yeon and Park So-hyun in three sets in the final.

== ITF Circuit finals ==
=== Singles: 6 (2 titles, 4 runner-ups) ===
Legend W60/75 tournaments W15 tournaments	Finals by surface Hard (1–0) Clay (1–4)

Result	W–L	Date	Tournament	Tier	Surface	Opponent	Score
Loss	1–0	Aug 2021	ITF Knokke, Belgium	W15	Clay	(France) Séléna Janicijevic	3–6, 6–7^{(0)}
Win	1–1	Mar 2022	ITF Amiens, France	W15	Clay	(Germany) Nicole Rivkin	6–4, 7–5
Loss	1–2	Jun 2022	Open de Biarritz, France	W60	Clay	(Germany) Mina Hodzic	3–6, 3–6
Loss	1–3	Sep 2023	ITF Dijon, France	W15	Clay	(Switzerland) Fiona Ganz	4–6, 7–6, 2–6
Win	2–3	Jun 2024	ITF Madrid, Spain	W15	Hard	(Switzerland) Alina Granwehr	6–1, 6–4
Loss	2–4	Sep 2025	ITF Nogent-sur-Marne, France	W15	Clay	(Poland) Anna Hertel	7–5, 2–6, 4–6

=== Doubles: 18 (9 titles, 9 runner–ups) ===
Legend W40/50 tournaments (2–0) W25/35 tournaments (2–3) W15 tournaments (5–6)	Finals by surface Hard (2–2) Clay (7–7)

Result	W–L	Date	Tournament	Tier	Surface	Partner	Opponents	Score
Loss	0–1	Sep 2020	ITF Saint Palais sur Mer, France	W15	Clay	(France) Anaëlle Leclercq	(France) Yasmine Mansouri (France) Lucie Wargnier	0–6, 3–6
Loss	0–2	Mar 2021	ITF Le Havre, France	W15	Clay	(France) Anaëlle Leclercq	(Portugal) Francisca Jorge (France) Camilla Rosatello	5–7, 2–6
Loss	0–3	Jul 2021	ITF Almada, Portugal	W15	Hard	(France) Océane Babel	(Brazil) Ingrid Martins (Spain) Olga Parres Azcoitia	6–4, 3–6, [8–10]
Win	1–3	Jul 2021	ITF Amarante, Portugal	W15	Hard	(France) Océane Babel	(Indonesia) Priska Madelyn Nugroho (Italy) Federica Rossi	6–4, 6–2
Loss	1–4	Aug 2021	ITF Knokke, Belgium	W15	Clay	(France) Anaëlle Leclercq	(France) Émeline Dartron (France) Margaux Rouvroy	1–6, 3–6
Loss	1–5	Nov 2021	ITF Roller Open, Luxembourg	W25	Hard (i)	(France) Julie Belgraver	(Switzerland) Xenia Knoll (Switzerland) Joanne Züger	3–6, 3–6
Win	2–5	Mar 2022	ITF Amiens, France	W15+H	Clay (i)	(France) Océane Babel	(Italy) Tatiana Pieri (Italy) Federica Rossi	6–3, 6–4
Loss	2–6	Apr 2022	ITF Cairo, Egypt	W15	Clay	(France) Émeline Dartron	(Italy) Diletta Cherubini; Mariia Tkacheva	6–3, 3–6, [8–10]
Loss	2–7	Jul 2023	Schönbusch Open, Germany	W25	Clay	(France) Manon Léonard	Elena Pridankina (Czech Republic) Ivana Šebestová	6–2, 2–6, [5–10]
Loss	2–8	Mar 2024	ITF Heraklion, Greece	W15	Clay	Ksenia Zaytseva	(Greece) Eleni Christofi (Greece) Sapfo Sakellaridi	3–6, 3–6
Win	3–8	Mar 2024	ITF Heraklion, Greece	W15	Clay	(France) Nina Vargová	(Italy) Laura Mair (Greece) Sapfo Sakellaridi	4–6, 6–4, [11–9]
Win	4–8	Sep 2025	ITF Nogent-sur-Marne, France	W15	Clay	Kseniya Yersh	(Ukraine) Anastasiia Firman (Ukraine) Polina Skliar	6–0, 6–4
Win	5–8	Oct 2025	ITF Cherbourg-en-Cotentin, France	W50	Hard (i)	(Spain) Lucía Cortez Llorca	(France) Manon Léonard (France) Amandine Monnot	6–4, 6–2
Win	6–8	Mar 2026	ITF Gonesse, France	W15	Clay (i)	(Canada) Françoise Abanda	(France) Océane Babel (Czech Republic) Amelie Justine Hejtmanek	6–3, 6–3
Loss	6–9	Jun 2026	ITF Aix-les-Bains, France	W35	Clay	(France) Yara Bartashevich	(Netherlands) Jasmijn Gimbrère (Greece) Sapfo Sakellaridi	7–6^{(4)}, 5–7, [7–10]
Win	7–9	Jul 2026	ITF Horb, Germany	W50	Clay	(Greece) Sapfo Sakellaridi	(South Korea) Back Da-yeon (South Korea) Park So-hyun	6–2, 2–6, [10–7]
Win	8–9	Oct 2026	ITF Seville, Spain	W35	Clay	(France) Marie Mattel	(Morocco) Yasmine Kabbaj (Switzerland) Katerina Tsygourova	6–4, 3–6, [10–6]
Win	9–9	Oct 2026	ITF Santa Margherita di Pula, Italy	W35	Clay	(Ukraine) Daria Yesypchuk	(Greece) Marianna Argyrokastriti (Spain) Lucía Cortez Llorca	6–3, 6–3
