= Océane Babel =

French tennis player (born 2004)

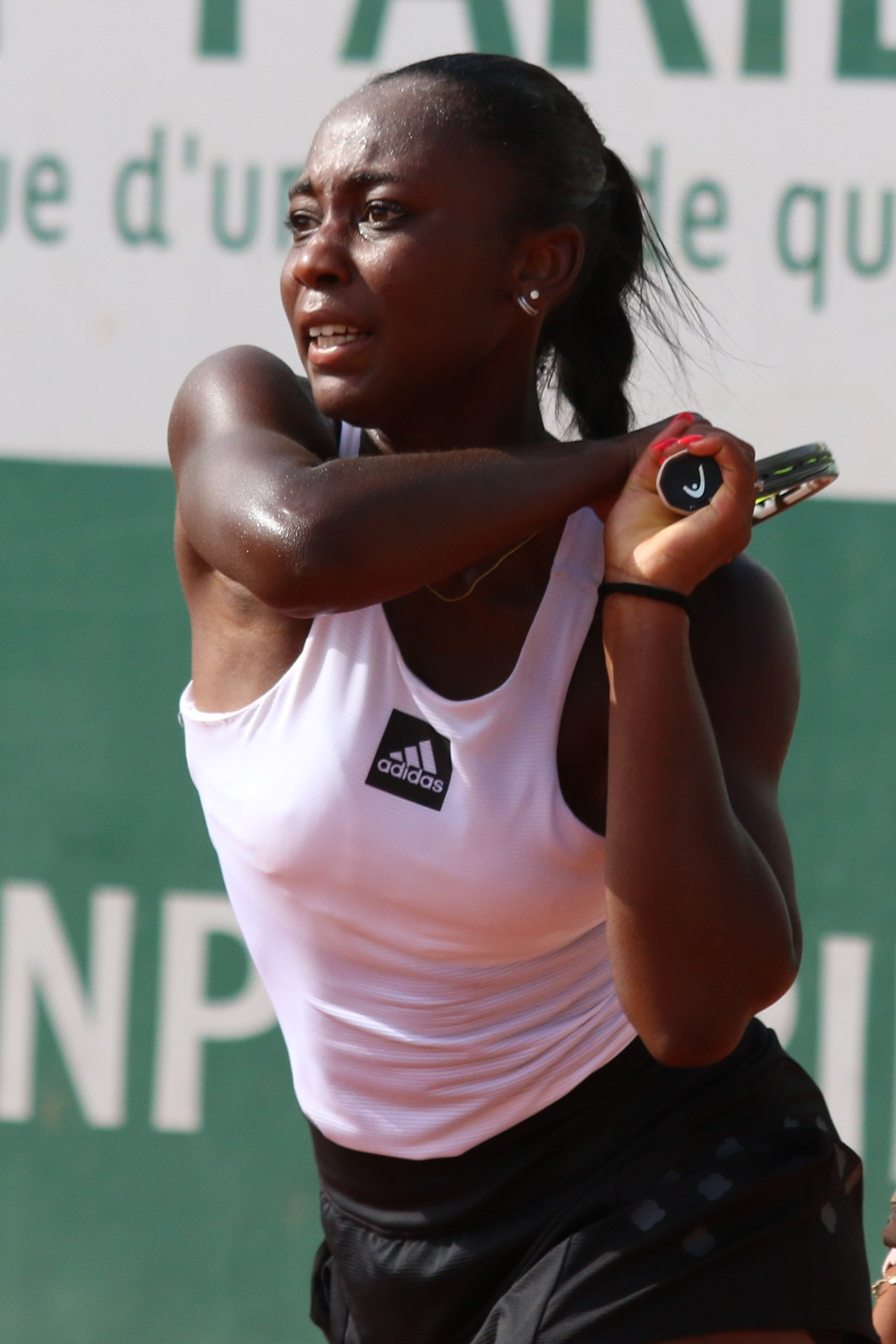
- Babel at the 2022 French Open
- Country (sports): France
- Born: 26 February 2004 (age 22) Paris
- Plays: Left (two-handed backhand)
- Prize money: $135,314

Singles
- Career record: 97–73
- Career titles: 3 ITF
- Highest ranking: No. 442 (2 January 2023)
- Current ranking: No. 785 (22 December 2025)

Grand Slam singles results
- French Open: 1R (2021)

Doubles
- Career record: 48–38
- Career titles: 4 ITF
- Highest ranking: No. 455 (20 February 2023)
- Current ranking: No. 1112 (22 December 2025)
- Last updated on: 22 December 2025.

Océane Babel (born 26 February 2004) is a French tennis player. She was awarded a wildcard into the 2021 French Open, marking her singles debut at major level, losing to Elina Svitolina in the first round.

== Career ==
Babel started playing tennis at five years old after practicing on the Nintendo Wii. After joining the Sarcellois Tennis Club in Val d'Oise, she became France under-13 champion in 2017 and repeated the performance the following year in the under-14 category. She then moved to the National Training Center (CNE) of the Federation in September 2018 where she began to be coached by Noëlle van Lottum.

Babel reached the quarterfinals of the girls' singles draw at the 2020 French Open in which she was defeated by Polina Kudermetova. She then won the opening Grade-A junior tournament of the 2021 season, in Criciúma, Brazil.

In May 2021, she had a junior world ranking of number seven. That month, Babel was awarded a wildcard into the 2021 French Open, marking her singles debut at major level, losing to Elina Svitolina in the first round. She played the girls' singles at the 2021 Wimbledon Championships, and www the only French player in the girls' singles draw. She won 6-4, 3-6, 7-6(7-4) in the first round against the Slovakian Radka Zelnickova, before being drawn against the Belarusian Evialina Laskevich in the second round.

In March 2022, she won an ITF doubles tournament in Amiens alongside compatriot Lucie Nguyen Tan. In May 2022, she defeated Alice Ramé and Ekaterine Gorgodze, to reach the third round of qualifying for the 2022 French Open, before facing Oksana Selekhmeteva.

=== Junior Grand Slam performance ===
Singles:

- Australian Open: –
- French Open: QF (2020)
- Wimbledon: 2R (2021)
- US Open: 2R (2021)

Doubles:

- Australian Open: –
- French Open: 2R (2020)
- Wimbledon: 1R (2021)
- US Open: 1R(2021)

== ITF finals ==
=== Singles: 5 (3 title, 2 runner-ups) ===
Legend W35 tournaments W15 tournaments	Finals by surface Hard (0–1) Clay (3–1)

Result	W–L	Date	Tournament	Tier	Surface	Opponent	Score
Loss	0–1	Nov 2021	ITF Monastir, Tunisia	W15	Hard	(Hungary) Rebeka Stolmár	4–6, 7–5, 4–6
Loss	0–2	Nov 2025	ITF Nules, Spain	W15	Clay	(Spain) Aran Teixidó García	6–7^{(4)}, 1–6
Win	1–2	Dec 2025	ITF Antalya, Turkey	W15	Clay	(Romania) Alesia Breaz	6–2, 6–2
Win	2–2	Jul 2026	ITF Rio Claro, Brazil	W15	Clay	(Brazil) Marjorie Souza	3–6, 6–4, 6–1
Win	3–2	Jul 2026	ITF São Paulo, Brazil	W35	Clay	(Ecuador) Mell Reasco	6–3, 6–4

=== Doubles: 11 (4 titles, 7 runner-ups) ===
Legend W25 tournaments W15 tournaments	Finals by surface Hard (2–2) Clay (2–5)

Result	W–L	Date	Tournament	Tier	Surface	Partner	Opponents	Score
Loss	0–1	Jul 2021	ITF Almada, Portugal	W15	Hard	(France) Lucie Nguyen Tan	(Brazil) Ingrid Martins (Spain) Olga Parres Azcoitia	6–4, 3–6, [8–10]
Win	1–1	Jul 2021	ITF Amarante, Portugal	W15	Hard	(France) Lucie Nguyen Tan	(Indonesia) Priska Madelyn Nugroho (Italy) Federica Rossi	6–4, 6–2
Win	2–1	Mar 2022	ITF Amiens, France	W15+H	Clay (i)	(France) Lucie Nguyen Tan	(Italy) Tatiana Pieri (Italy) Federica Rossi	6–3, 6–4
Win	3–1	May 2022	ITF Cairo, Egypt	W25	Clay	(Poland) Weronika Falkowska	(Sweden) Caijsa Hennemann; Mariia Tkacheva	6–4, 6–1
Loss	3–2	May 2022	ITF Cairo, Egypt	W15	Clay	(Netherlands) Noa Liauw a Fong	(Austria) Melanie Klaffner; Anastasia Zolotareva	1–6, 5–7
Loss	3–3	Nov 2022	ITF Monastir, Tunisia	W15	Hard	(France) Manon Léonard	(Greece) Eleni Kordolaimi (Egypt) Merna Refaat	3–6, 6–0, [8–10]
Win	4–3	Nov 2022	ITF Lousada, Portugal	W15	Hard (i)	(Switzerland) Leonie Küng	(Spain) Celia Cerviño Ruiz (Switzerland) Tess Sugnaux	7–6^{(3)}, 5–7, [10–2]
Loss	4–4	Sep 2025	ITF Dinard, France	W15	Clay	(France) Helena Stevic	(Netherlands) Merel Hoedt (Mexico) Sabastiani Leon	3–6, 7–5, [3–10]
Loss	4–5	Mar 2026	ITF Gonesse, France	W15	Clay (i)	(Czech Republic) Amelie Justine Hejtmanek	(Canada) Françoise Abanda (France) Lucie Nguyen Tan	3–6, 3–6
Loss	4–6	Mar 2026	ITF Le Havre, France	W15	Clay (i)	(Czech Republic) Amelie Justine Hejtmanek	(Italy) Enola Chiesa (Italy) Camilla Gennaro	6–7^{(5)}, 4–6
Loss	4–7	Aug 2026	ITF Bucharest, Romania	W15	Clay	(Italy) Federica Sacco	(Romania) Alesia Breaz (Romania) Cristiana Nicoleta Todoni	6–7^{(5)}, 4–6
