= Merel Hoedt =

Dutch tennis player (born 1999)

- Country (sports): Netherlands
- Born: 20 August 1999 (age 27) Best, Netherlands
- Plays: Right (two-handed backhand)
- Prize money: $90,869
- Official website: https://www.merelhoedt.nl/

Singles
- Career record: 230–193
- Career titles: 3 ITF
- Highest ranking: No. 468 (3 October 2022)
- Current ranking: No. 655 (16 November 2026)

Doubles
- Career record: 162–107
- Career titles: 13 ITF
- Highest ranking: No. 228 (9 November 2026)
- Current ranking: No. 229 (16 November 2026)
- Last updated on: 22 November 2026.

Merel Hoedt (born 20 August 1999) is a Dutch tennis player.

She has a career-high doubles ranking by the WTA of No. 228, achieved on 9 November 2026.

== Early life ==
Born in Best, Hoedt began playing tennis at the age of four. Her mother, Yvonne der Kinderen, is a former tennis player. In 2017, she became the Dutch under-18 champion by defeating Noa Liauw a Fong in the final.

== Career ==
She and Belgian player Eliessa Vanlangendonck won the women's doubles final in March 2021 at the ITF World Tennis Tour event in Monastir.

In August 2023, Hoedt won the singles title at the W15 event held in Eindhoven, Netherlands, by defeating fellow Dutch Isis Louise van den Broek in three sets.

In December 2024, she and Monique Barry from New Zealand won the women's doubles title in Wellington by defeating Japanese pairing of Shiho Akita and Nanari Katsumi in the final.

In April 2026, she and American player Julia Adams won the women's doubles final at the W50 event in Bujumbura against French player Nahia Berecoechea and British Ranah Stoiber. This championship is her first bigger title. The duo became champions again in Bujumbura a week later.

In July 2026, she and American Julia Adams won the doubles title at the W50 event in Knokke-Heist defeating Polish player Daria Kuczer and Egyptian Sandra Samir in the final.

== ITF Circuit finals ==
=== Singles: 3 (3 titles) ===
Legend W35 tournaments W15 tournaments (3–0)	Finals by surface Hard (1–0) Clay (2–0)

Result	W–L	Date	Tournament	Tier	Surface	Opponent	Score
Win	1–0	Sep 2019	ITF Pretoria, South Africa	W15	Hard	(Austria) Yvonne Neuwirth	6–2, 6–1
Win	2–0	Jul 2023	ITF Casablanca, Morocco	W15	Clay	(Serbia) Andrea Obradović	6–3, 6–2
Win	3–0	Aug 2023	ITF Eindhoven, Netherlands	W15	Clay	(Netherlands) Isis Louise van den Broek	3–6, 6–3, 6–2

=== Doubles: 28 (13 titles, 15 runner-ups) ===
Legend W75 tournaments (0–1) W50 tournaments (3–1) W25/35 tournaments (0–3) W15 tournaments (10–10)	Finals by surface Hard (5–8) Clay (8–7)

Result	W–L	Date	Tournament	Tier	Surface	Partner	Opponents	Score
Win	1–0	Aug 2017	ITF Mrągowo, Poland	W15	Clay	(Belgium) Mathilde Devits	(Czech Republic) Diana Šumová (France) Jade Suvrijn	6–4, 6–2
Loss	1–1	Jun 2018	ITF Hammamet, Tunisia	W15	Clay	(Belgium) Eliessa Vanlangendonck	(Greece) Eleni Kordolaimi (France) Alice Ramé	2–6, 2–6
Loss	1–2	Oct 2018	Lagos Open, Nigeria	W25	Hard	(Netherlands) Noa Liauw a Fong	(Bulgaria) Julia Terziyska (Netherlands) Rosalie van der Hoek	4–6, 4–6
Win	2–2	Dec 2018	ITF Djibouti, Djibouti	W15	Hard	(Netherlands) Noa Liauw a Fong	(Germany) Patricia Böntgen (Germany) Katharina Hering	7–6^{(6)}, 6–4
Loss	2–3	Feb 2019	ITF Sharm El Sheikh, Egypt	W15	Hard	(Netherlands) Noa Liauw a Fong	(Croatia) Mariana Dražić (Norway) Malene Helgø	4–6, 3–6
Loss	2–4	Mar 2019	ITF Sharm El Sheikh	W15	Hard	(Netherlands) Noa Liauw a Fong	(Austria) Melanie Klaffner (Germany) Julia Wachaczyk	2–6, 2–6
Loss	2–5	Mar 2019	ITF Tel Aviv, Israel	W15	Hard	(Czech Republic) Anna Sisková	(Uzbekistan) Vlada Ekshibarova (Russia) Daria Kruzhkova	3–6, 2–6
Win	3–5	Aug 2019	ITF Tabarka, Tunisia	W15	Clay	(Australia) Seone Mendez	(Australia) Alicia Smith (Belgium) Chelsea Vanhoutte	6–3, 7–5
Loss	3–6	Sep 2019	ITF Pretoria, South Africa	W15	Hard	(India) Zeel Desai	(France) Caroline Roméo (South Africa) Chanel Simmonds	w/o
Loss	3–7	Oct 2019	ITF Pretoria, South Africa	W15	Hard	(France) Caroline Roméo	(United States) Sarah Lee (Mexico) Sabastiani León	6–4, 4–6, [4–10]
Win	4–7	Mar 2021	ITF Monastir, Tunisia	W15	Hard	(Belgium) Eliessa Vanlangendonck	(Sweden) Jacqueline Cabaj Awad (Netherlands) Suzan Lamens	6–2, 2–6, [10–5]
Loss	4–8	Apr 2021	ITF Cairo, Egypt	W15	Clay	(Netherlands) Isabelle Haverlag	(Armenia) Elina Avanesyan (Russia) Maria Timofeeva	6–1, 4–6, [8–10]
Loss	4–9	Nov 2021	ITF Aparecida de Goiania, Brazil	W25	Clay	(Germany) Luisa Meyer auf der Heide	(Brazil) Laura Pigossi (Czech Republic) Anna Sisková	2–6, 6–7^{(5)}
Win	5–9	Apr 2023	ITF Antalya, Turkiye	W15	Clay	(Italy) Miriana Tona	(Kazakhstan) Asylzhan Arystanbekova (Kazakhstan) Dana Baidaulet	6–4, 6–4
Win	6–9	Jul 2023	ITF Casablanca, Morocco	W15	Clay	(Netherlands) Demi Tran	(Morocco) Manal Ennaciri (Morocco) Salma Loudili	3–6, 6–2, [10–4]
Win	7–9	Dec 2024	ITF Wellington, New Zealand	W15	Hard	(New Zealand) Monique Barry	(Japan) Shiho Akita (Japan) Nanari Katsumi	6–3, 6–3
Win	8–9	Feb 2025	ITF Manacor, Spain	W15	Hard	(France) Alice Robbe	(China) Tian Jialin (Italy) Laura Mair	7–6^{(3)}, 6–2
Loss	8–10	Aug 2025	ITF Bielsko-Biała, Poland	W15	Clay	(Germany) Angelina Wirges	(Poland) Daria Gorska (Czech Republic) Emma Slavíková	6–7^{(6)}, 6–4, [4–10]
Win	9–10	Sep 2025	ITF Dinard, France	W15	Clay	(Mexico) Sabastiani Leon	(France) Océane Babel (France) Helena Stevic	6–3, 5–7, [10–3]
Loss	9–11	Oct 2025	ITF Santa Tecla, El Salvador	W15	Hard	(Colombia) María Herazo González	(Mexico) Jéssica Hinojosa Gómez (Mexico) María Fernanda Navarro Oliva	5–7, 6–2, [7–10]
Loss	9–12	Feb 2026	ITF Manacor, Spain	W15	Hard	(Uzbekistan) Sevil Yuldasheva	(Mexico) Midori Castillo Meza (Colombia) Valentina Mediorreal	5–7, 4–6
Win	10–12	Feb 2026	ITF Manacor, Spain	W15	Hard	(Colombia) Valentina Mediorreal	(United Kingdom) Lauryn John-Baptiste (United Kingdom) Eliz Maloney	6–4, 7–5
Win	11–12	Apr 2026	ITF Bujumbura, Burundi	W50	Clay	(United States) Julia Adams	(France) Nahia Berecoechea (United Kingdom) Ranah Stoiber	6–4, 7–5
Win	12–12	Apr 2026	ITF Bujumbura, Burundi	W50	Clay	(United States) Julia Adams	(India) Vaidehi Chaudhari (Netherlands) Jasmijn Gimbrère	4–6, 7–5, [10–5]
Loss	12–13	Jun 2026	ITF Klosters, Switzerland	W35	Clay	(Hungary) Adrienn Nagy	(Czech Republic) Michaela Bayerlová (Germany) Eva Marie Voracek	6–4, 6–7^{(1)}, [5–10]
Win	13–13	Jul 2026	ITF Knokke-Heist, Belgium	W50	Clay	(United States) Julia Adams	(Poland) Daria Kuczer (Egypt) Sandra Samir	7–6^{(5)}, 6–2
Loss	13–14	Aug 2026	ITF Koksijde, Belgium	W75	Clay	(United States) Julia Adams	(Belgium) Kaat Coppez (Netherlands) Loes Ebeling Koning	5–7, 6–3, [5–10]
Loss	13–15	Sep 2026	Pazardzhik Cup, Bulgaria	W50	Clay	(United States) Julia Adams	(Romania) Oana Gavrilă (Greece) Sapfo Sakellaridi	4–6, 4–6
