= Mina Hodzic =

German tennis player (born 2002)

- Country (sports): Germany
- Born: 6 June 2002 (age 24)
- Plays: Right-handed (two-handed backhand)
- Prize money: US $127,049

Singles
- Career record: 215–159
- Career titles: 3 ITF
- Highest ranking: No. 272 (14 September 2026)
- Current ranking: No. 286 (9 November 2026)

Doubles
- Career record: 37–43
- Career titles: 2 ITF
- Highest ranking: No. 271 (13 July 2026)
- Current ranking: No. 278 (9 November 2026)
- Last updated on: 11 November 2026.

Mina Hodzic (Serbo-Croatian: Hodžić; born 6 June 2002) is a German professional tennis player.

Hodzic has a career high WTA singles ranking of world No. 272, achieved on 14 September 2026, and a best doubles ranking of No. 271, attained on 13 July 2026.

She won her first major ITF title at the 2022 Engie Open de Biarritz in singles.

Ranked at world No. 334, Hodzic qualified to make her WTA Tour main-draw debut at the 2026 Athens Open, losing in the first round to Harriet Dart in a match lasting two hours and 45 minutes which was decided in a third set tiebreak.

== ITF Circuit finals ==
=== Singles: 6 (3 titles, 3 runner-ups) ===
| Legend W60 tournaments (1–0) W15 tournaments (2–3) | Finals by surface Hard (1–0) Clay (2–3) |

| Result | W–L | Date | Tournament | Tier | Surface | Opponent | Score |
|---|---|---|---|---|---|---|---|
| Win | 1–0 | Feb 2020 | ITF Manacor, Spain | W15 | Hard | (Switzerland) Valentina Ryser | 6–0, 6–3 |
| Win | 2–0 | Jun 2022 | Open de Biarritz, France | W60 | Clay | (France) Lucie Nguyen Tan | 6–3, 6–3 |
| Loss | 2–1 | Nov 2023 | ITF Nules, Spain | W15 | Clay | (Spain) Ángela Fita Boluda | 4–6, 3–6 |
| Win | 3–1 | Dec 2024 | ITF Antalya, Turkey | W15 | Clay | (Greece) Sapfo Sakellaridi | 6–2, 4–2 ret. |
| Loss | 3–2 | Feb 2025 | ITF Antalya, Turkey | W15 | Clay | (Argentina) Luisina Giovannini | 1–6, 3–6 |
| Loss | 3–3 | Sep 2025 | ITF Dijon, France | W15 | Clay | (Germany) Luisa Meyer auf der Heide | 6–7^{(1–7)}, 3–6 |

=== Doubles: 9 (2 titles, 7 runner-ups) ===
| Legend W100 tournaments (0–1) W75 tournaments (0–1) W50 tournaments (0–1) W35 tournaments (1–1) W15 tournaments (1–3) | Finals by surface Hard (1–3) Clay (1–4) |

| Result | W–L | Date | Tournament | Tier | Surface | Partner | Opponents | Score |
|---|---|---|---|---|---|---|---|---|
| Loss | 0–1 | Sep 2024 | ITF Haren, Netherlands | W15 | Clay | (Germany) Laura Böhner | (Netherlands) Rose Marie Nijkamp (Netherlands) Isis Louise van den Broek | 6–4, 6–7^{(4–7)}, [6–10] |
| Loss | 0–2 | Sep 2024 | ITF Dijon, France | W15 | Clay | (Germany) Fabienne Gettwart | (Netherlands) Rose Marie Nijkamp (Netherlands) Isis Louise van den Broek | 6–7^{(1–7)}, 4–6 |
| Loss | 0–3 | Oct 2024 | Torneig Els Gorchs, Spain | W100 | Hard | (Germany) Caroline Werner | Alina Charaeva; Ekaterina Reyngold | 2–6, 6–7^{(2–7)} |
| Loss | 0–4 | Jan 2025 | ITF Antalya, Turkey | W15 | Clay | (Switzerland) Marie Mettraux | (Kazakhstan) Sandugash Kenzhibayeva (Turkey) İlay Yörük | 4–6, 7–5, [8–10] |
| Loss | 0–5 | Aug 2025 | ITF Erwitte, Germany | W35 | Clay | (Germany) Laura Böhner | (Belgium) Tilwith Di Girolami (Indonesia) Priska Madelyn Nugroho | 6–7^{(10–12)}, 1–6 |
| Win | 1–5 | Sep 2025 | ITF Dijon, France | W15 | Clay | Polina Bakhmutkina | (Mexico) Sabastiani Leon (Germany) Luisa Meyer auf der Heide | 6–3, 6–7^{(5–7)}, [10–1] |
| Win | 2–5 | Nov 2025 | ITF Faro, Portugal | W35 | Hard | (Germany) Josy Daems | (India) Vasanti Shinde (Latvia) Elza Tomase | 6–3, 6–7^{(5–7)}, [11–9] |
| Loss | 2–6 | Nov 2025 | ITF Funchal, Portugal | W50 | Hard | (Belgium) Polina Bakhmutkina | (United Kingdom) Holly Hutchinson (United Kingdom) Ella McDonald | 2–6, 6–4, [8–10] |
| Loss | 2–7 | Jan 2026 | ITF Manama, Bahrain | W75 | Hard | (Belgium) Polina Bakhmutkina | (Slovakia) Viktória Hrunčáková; Anastasia Tikhonova | 4–6, 3–6 |
