= 2011 Fed Cup Americas Zone Group II – play-offs =

Tennis competition play-offs

The play-offs of the 2011 Fed Cup Americas Zone Group II were the final stages of the Group II Zonal Competition involving teams from the Americas. Using the positions determined in their pools, the seven teams faced off to determine their placing in the 2011 Fed Cup Americas Zone Group II. The top two teams advanced to Group I for the next year.

Placing	Pool A	Pool B
1	Guatemala	Venezuela
2	Uruguay	Bahamas
3	Puerto Rico	Ecuador
4	Dominican Republic	Costa Rica
5	Trinidad and Tobago	Panama

== Promotion play-offs ==
The first placed teams of each pool played against the second-placed teams of the other pool in head-to-head rounds. The winner of each round advanced to the 2012 Americas Zone Group I.

=== Guatemala vs. Bahamas ===
Guatemala
0
Centro Nacional de Tenis, Santo Domingo, Dominican Republic
May 21, 2011
Hard (outdoors)

Bahamas
2

			1	2	3
1	(Guatemala) (The Bahamas)	Daniela Schippers; Simone Pratt	0; 6	3; 6
2	(Guatemala) (The Bahamas)	Kirsten-Andrea Weedon; Kerrie Cartwright	4; 6	4; 6
3	(Guatemala) (The Bahamas)	Daniela Schippers / Paulina Schippers; Nikkita Fountain / Larikah Russell				not played

=== Uruguay vs. Venezuela ===
Uruguay
0
Centro Nacional de Tenis, Santo Domingo, Dominican Republic
May 21, 2011
Hard (outdoors)

Venezuela
2

			1	2	3
1	(Uruguay) (Venezuela)	Leticia Demichelli; Adriana Pérez	3; 6	0; 6
2	(Uruguay) (Venezuela)	Carolina de los Santos; Andrea Gámiz	2; 6	4; 6
3	(Uruguay) (Venezuela)	Carolina de los Santos / Virginia Sadi; Mariana Muci / Adriana Pérez				not played

== 5th to 6th play-off ==
The third placed teams of each pool played in a head-to-head round to find the fifth and sixth placed teams.

=== Puerto Rico vs. Ecuador ===
Puerto Rico
1
Centro Nacional de Tenis, Santo Domingo, Dominican Republic
May 21, 2011
Hard (outdoors)

Ecuador
2

			1	2	3
1	(Puerto Rico) (Ecuador)	Mónica Matías; Ana-María Zuleta	3; 6	3; 6
2	(Puerto Rico) (Ecuador)	Ana Sofía Cordero; Hilda Zuleta-Cabrera	7; 5	7; 5
3	(Puerto Rico) (Ecuador)	Ana Sofía Cordero / Mónica Matías; Alejandra Álvarez / Ana-María Zuleta	3; 6	0; 6

== 7th to 8th play-off ==
The fourth placed teams of each pool played in a head-to-head round to find the seventh and eighth placed teams.

=== Costa Rica vs. Dominican Republic ===
Costa Rica
0
Centro Nacional de Tenis, Santo Domingo, Dominican Republic
May 21, 2011
Hard (outdoors)

Dominican Republic
3

			1	2	3
1	(Costa Rica) (Dominican Republic)	Camila Quesada; Michelle Marie Valdez	0; 6	2; 6
2	(Costa Rica) (Dominican Republic)	Andrea Brenes; Chandra Capozzi	6^{1} 7^{7}	5; 7
3	(Costa Rica) (Dominican Republic)	Andrea Brenes / Mariella Calderon; Daysi Espinal / Joelle Schad	4; 6	6; 4	5; 7

== 9th to 10th play-off ==
The last placed teams of each pool played in a head-to-head round to find the ninth and tenth placed teams.

=== Trinidad and Tobago vs. Panama ===
Trinidad and Tobago
2
Centro Nacional de Tenis, Santo Domingo, Dominican Republic
May 21, 2011
Hard (outdoors)

Panama
1

			1	2	3
1	(Trinidad and Tobago) (Panama)	Trevine Sellier; Gabriela González	5; 7	2; 6
2	(Trinidad and Tobago) (Panama)	Carlista Mohammed; Rosaline Zafir Chávez Tello	6; 3	6; 2
3	(Trinidad and Tobago) (Panama)	Carlista Mohammed / Breana Stampfli; Rosaline Zafir Chávez Tello / Gabriela González	6; 2	6; 3

== Final Placements ==
Placing	Teams
Promoted	Bahamas
Promoted	Venezuela
Third	Guatemala
Third	Uruguay
Fifth	Ecuador
Sixth	Puerto Rico
Seventh	Dominican Republic
Eighth	Costa Rica
Ninth	Trinidad and Tobago
Tenth	Panama

- Bahamas and Venezuela were promoted to Americas Zone Group I for 2012. Both teams were sent to the relegation play-offs, and met in their play-off tie. The Venezuelans won, and thus remained in Group I for 2013 while the Bahamians were relegated back to Group II.

== See also ==
- Fed Cup structure
