= 2010 Fed Cup Americas Zone Group II – play-offs =

Tennis competition play-offs

The play-offs of the 2010 Fed Cup Americas Zone Group II were the final stages of the Group II Zonal Competition involving teams from the Americas. Using the positions determined in their pools, the ten teams faced off to determine their placing in the 2010 Fed Cup Americas Zone Group II. The top two teams advanced to Group I for the next year.

Placing	Pool A	Pool B
1	Ecuador	Peru
2	Bahamas	Mexico
3	Costa Rica	Guatemala
4	Trinidad and Tobago	Bermuda
5	Dominican Republic	Panama

== Promotion play-offs ==
The first and second placed teams of each pool were placed against each other in two head-to-head rounds. The winner of the rounds advanced to Group I for 2011.

=== Ecuador vs. Mexico ===
Ecuador
1
National Tennis Club, Guayaquil, Ecuador
24 April 2010
Clay (outdoors)

Mexico
2

			1	2	3
1	(Ecuador) (Mexico)	Doménica González; Ximena Hermoso	4; 6	4; 6
2	(Ecuador) (Mexico)	Marie Elise Casares; Alejandra Granillo	6; 2	7^{7} 6^{4}
3	(Ecuador) (Mexico)	Mariana Correa / Doménica González; Ximena Hermoso / Daniela Múñoz Gallegos	2; 6	4; 6

=== Bahamas vs. Peru ===
Bahamas
1
National Tennis Club, Guayaquil, Ecuador
24 April 2010
Clay (outdoors)

Peru
2

			1	2	3
1	(The Bahamas) (Peru)	Simone Pratt; Patricia Kú Flores	1; 6	5; 7
2	(The Bahamas) (Peru)	Kerrie Cartwright; Bianca Botto	2; 6	1; 6
3	(The Bahamas) (Peru)	Kerrie Cartwright / Gabrielle Moxey; Bianca Botto / Ximena Siles Luna	2; 0			retired

== Fifth to Sixth play-offs ==
The third-placed teams from each pool were drawn in head-to-head rounds to find the fifth and sixth placed teams.

=== Costa Rica vs. Guatemala ===
Costa Rica
1
National Tennis Club, Guayaquil, Ecuador
24 April 2010
Clay (outdoors)

Guatemala
2

			1	2	3
1	(Costa Rica) (Guatemala)	María Moya; Daniela Schippers	1; 6	0; 6
2	(Costa Rica) (Guatemala)	Camila Quesada; Kirsten Andrea Weedon	1; 6	5; 7
3	(Costa Rica) (Guatemala)	Melissa Golfín / Laura Víquez; Isabella Escobar / Jennifer Pusey	7; 5	2; 6	6; 1

== Seventh to Eighth play-offs ==
The fourth-placed teams from each pool were drawn in head-to-head rounds to find the seventh and eighth placed teams.

=== Trinidad and Tobago vs. Bermuda ===
Trinidad and Tobago
3
National Tennis Club, Guayaquil, Ecuador
24 April 2010
Clay (outdoors)

Bermuda
0

			1	2	3
1	(Trinidad and Tobago) (Bermuda)	Dayna Grazette; Jacklyn Lambert	6; 2	5; 7	7; 5
2	(Trinidad and Tobago) (Bermuda)	Olivia Bennett; Tara Lambert	6; 1	6; 3
3	(Trinidad and Tobago) (Bermuda)	Dayna Grazette / Breana Stampfli; Caitlin Gordon / Jacklyn Lambert	1; 6	6; 4	7^{9} 6^{7}

== Ninth and Tenth play-offs ==
The fifth-placed teams from each pool were drawn in head-to-head rounds to find the ninth and tenth placed teams.

=== Dominican Republic vs. Panama ===
Dominican Republic
0
National Tennis Club, Guayaquil, Ecuador
24 April 2010
Clay (outdoors)

Panama
3

			1	2	3
1	(Dominican Republic) (Panama)	Paloma Castillo; Rosaline Zafir Chávez Tello	0; 6	2; 6
2	(Dominican Republic) (Panama)	Diana Espinal; Alma Michelle Espinosa Rodríguez	0; 6	2; 6
3	(Dominican Republic) (Panama)	Paloma Castillo / Daysi Espinal; Rosaline Zafir Chávez Tello / Yeniseik Gómez	4; 6	4; 6

== Final placements ==
Placing	Teams
Promoted	Mexico
Promoted	Peru
Third	Ecuador
Third	Bahamas
Fifth	Guatemala
Sixth	Costa Rica
Seventh	Trinidad and Tobago
Eighth	Bermuda
Ninth	Panama
Tenth	Dominican Republic

- Mexico and Peru advanced to 2010 Fed Cup Americas Zone Group I. The Peruvians placed fourth overall, while the Mexicans placed last and thus were relegated back to Group II for 2012.

== See also ==
- Fed Cup structure
