= Daniela Schippers =

Guatemalan tennis player

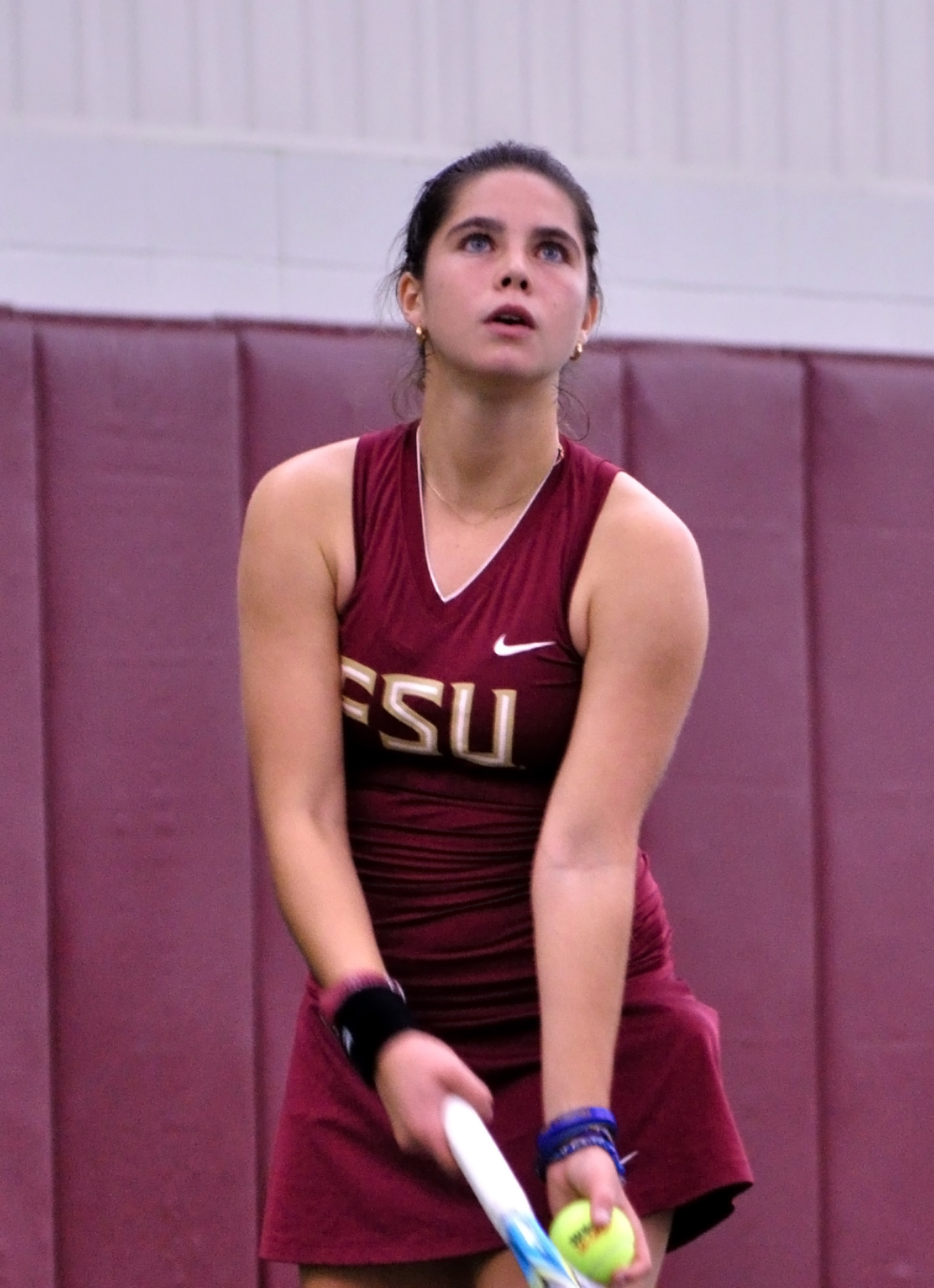
- Schippers playing for the Florida State Seminoles in 2014
- Full name: Daniela Schippers
- Country (sports): Guatemala
- Born: 28 March 1995 (age 30); Guatemala City, Guatemala
- College: Florida State Seminoles
- Prize money: $4,570

Singles
- Career record: 16–21
- Career titles: 0
- Highest ranking: 1103 (11 November 2013)

Grand Slam singles results
- US Open Junior: Q1 (2011)

Doubles
- Career record: 32–23
- Career titles: 2 ITF
- Highest ranking: 531 (18 November 2013)

Team competitions
- Fed Cup: 18–12
Medal record
Representing Guatemala
Central American and Caribbean Games
Bronze medal – third place	2014 Veracruz	Women's doubles
Bronze medal – third place	2014 Veracruz	Team event
Bronze medal – third place	2018 Barranquilla	Team event

Daniela Schippers (born 28 March 1995) is a Guatemalan former tennis player.

On the ITF Junior Circuit, Schippers has a career-high combined ranking of 213, achieved on 23 January 2012.

In her career, Schippers won two doubles titles on the ITF Women's Circuit. On 11 November 2013, she reached her best singles ranking of world No. 1103. On 18 November 2013, she peaked at No. 531 in the doubles rankings.

Since her debut for the Guatemala Fed Cup team in 2010, Schippers has a 18–12 record in international competition.

She was studying at Florida State University, between 2013 and 2017.

Her older sister Paulina is also a tennis player.

== ITF Circuit finals ==
=== Doubles: 5 (2 titles, 3 runner-ups) ===
Legend $100,000 tournaments $75,000 tournaments $50,000 tournaments $25,000 tournaments $10,000 tournaments	Finals by surface Hard (1–2) Clay (1–1) Grass (0–0) Carpet (0–0)

Result	No.	Date	Tier	Tournament	Surface	Partner	Opponents	Score
Loss	1.	Nov 2012	10,000	ITF Temuco, Chile	Clay	(Japan) Sachie Ishizu	(Argentina) Victoria Bosio (Chile) Daniela Seguel	4–6, 2–6
Loss	2.	May 2013	10,000	ITF Quintana Roo, Mexico	Hard	(Mexico) Ana Sofía Sánchez	(United States) Danielle Mills (Dominican Republic) Francesca Segarelli	2–6, 4–6
Loss	3.	Jun 2013	10,000	ITF Quintana Roo	Hard	(Mexico) Ana Sofía Sánchez	(Japan) Akari Inoue (Australia) Julia Moriarty	7–5, 6–7^{(4–7)}, [10–12]
Win	1.	Jul 2013	10,000	ITF São José dos Campos, Brazil	Clay	(Argentina) Victoria Bosio	(Brazil) Laura Pigossi (Argentina) Carolina Zeballos	7–5, 6–4
Win	2.	Oct 2013	10,000	ITF Quintana Roo, Mexico	Hard	(Dominican Republic) Francesca Segarelli	(Mexico) Constanza Gorches (Mexico) Jessica Hinojosa Gómez	7–5, 7–6^{(7–2)}

== National representation ==
=== Fed Cup ===
Schippers made her Fed Cup debut for Guatemala in 2010, while the team was competing in the Americas Zone Group II, when she was 15 years and 22 days old.

==== Fed Cup (18–12) ====
Group membership World Group (0–0) World Group Play-off (0–0) World Group II (0–0) World Group II Play-off (0–0) Americas Group (18–12)	Matches by surface Hard (8–3) Clay (10–9) Grass (0–0) Carpet (0–0)	Matches by type Singles (9–9) Doubles (9–3)	Matches by setting Indoors (0–0) Outdoors (18–12)

===== Singles (9–9) =====
Edition	Stage	Date	Location	Against	Surface	Opponent	W/L	Score
2010 Fed Cup; Americas Zone Group II	Pool B	19 April 2010	Guayaquil, Ecuador	Panama	Clay	Yeniseik Gómez	W	6–0, 6–0
2010 Fed Cup; Americas Zone Group II	Pool B	20 April 2010	Guayaquil, Ecuador	Mexico	Clay	Ximena Hermoso	L	1–6, 2–6
2010 Fed Cup; Americas Zone Group II	Pool B	21 April 2010	Guayaquil, Ecuador	Peru	Clay	Bianca Botto	L	0–6, 1–6
2010 Fed Cup; Americas Zone Group II	5th-6th Play-off	24 April 2010	Guayaquil, Ecuador	Costa Rica	Clay	María Moya	W	6–1, 6–0
2011 Fed Cup; Americas Zone Group II	Pool A	16 May 2011	Santo Domingo, Dominican Republic	Trinidad and Tobago	Hard	Breana Stampfli	W	6–2, 6–2
2011 Fed Cup; Americas Zone Group II	Pool A	17 May 2011	Santo Domingo, Dominican Republic	Dominican Republic	Hard	Daysi Espinal	W	6–0, 6–0
2011 Fed Cup; Americas Zone Group II	Pool A	18 May 2011	Santo Domingo, Dominican Republic	Uruguay	Hard	Leticia Demichelli	W	6–2, 6–2
2011 Fed Cup; Americas Zone Group II	Pool A	20 May 2011	Santo Domingo, Dominican Republic	Puerto Rico	Hard	Yolimar Ogando	L	6–7^{(3–7)}, 5–7
2011 Fed Cup; Americas Zone Group II	Promotional Play-off	21 May 2011	Santo Domingo, Dominican Republic	(The Bahamas) Bahamas	Hard	Simone Pratt	L	0–6, 3–6
2012 Fed Cup; Americas Zone Group II	Pool A	17 April 2012	Guadalajara, Mexico	Dominican Republic	Clay	Michelle Marie Valdez	W	5–7, 7–5, 6–2
2012 Fed Cup; Americas Zone Group II	Pool A	18 April 2012	Guadalajara, Mexico	Ecuador	Clay	Paula Castro	W	6–2, 7–6^{(7–3)}
2012 Fed Cup; Americas Zone Group II	Pool A	19 April 2012	Guadalajara, Mexico	Trinidad and Tobago	Clay	Yolande Leacock	L	2–6, 7–5, 2–6
2012 Fed Cup; Americas Zone Group II	Promotional Play-off	21 April 2012	Guadalajara, Mexico	Chile	Clay	Andrea Koch Benvenuto	L	1–6, 4–6
2015 Fed Cup; Americas Zone Group II	Pool D	24 June 2015	Santo Domingo, Dominican Republic	Bermuda	Hard	Cayla Cross	W	6–0, 6–0
2015 Fed Cup; Americas Zone Group II	Promotional Play-off	27 June 2015	Santo Domingo, Dominican Republic	Ecuador	Hard	Camila Romero	L	6–3, 4–6, 4–6
2017 Fed Cup; Americas Zone Group II	Pool B	21 July 2017	Panama City, Panama	Dominican Republic	Clay	Karla Portalatín	W	6–1, 6–2
2018 Fed Cup; Americas Zone Group I	Pool B	7 February 2018	Asunción, Paraguay	Argentina	Clay	Paula Ormaechea	L	5–7, 2–6
2018 Fed Cup; Americas Zone Group I	Pool B	9 February 2018	Asunción, Paraguay	Venezuela	Clay	Aymet Uzcátegui	L	7–6^{(7–5)}, 3–6, 6–7^{(4–7)}

===== Doubles (9–3) =====
Edition	Stage	Date	Location	Against	Surface	Partner	Opponents	W/L	Score
2010 Fed Cup; Americas Zone Group II	Pool B	19 April 2010	Guayaquil, Ecuador	Mexico	Clay	Isabella Escobar	Ximena Hermoso; Daniela Múñoz Gallegos	L	2–6, 0–6
2010 Fed Cup; Americas Zone Group II	Pool B	23 April 2010	Guayaquil, Ecuador	Bermuda	Clay	Jennifer Pusey	Jacklyn Lambert; Tara Lambert	W	6–1, 7–6^{(7–2)}
2011 Fed Cup; Americas Zone Group II	Pool A	16 May 2011	Santo Domingo, Dominican Republic	Trinidad and Tobago	Hard	Paulina Schippers	Trevine Sellier; Breana Stampfli	W	6–3, 6–2
2011 Fed Cup; Americas Zone Group II	Pool A	17 May 2011	Santo Domingo, Dominican Republic	Dominican Republic	Hard	Paulina Schippers	Daysi Espinal; Joelle Schad	W	6–2, 4–6, 6–3
2011 Fed Cup; Americas Zone Group II	Pool A	18 May 2011	Santo Domingo, Dominican Republic	Uruguay	Hard	Paulina Schippers	Carolina de los Santos; Leticia Demichelli	W	5–7, 7–5, 7–5
2012 Fed Cup; Americas Zone Group II	Pool A	17 April 2012	Guadalajara, Mexico	Dominican Republic	Clay	Camila Ramazzini	Karla Portalatín; Joelle Schad	W	7–5, 6–4
2012 Fed Cup; Americas Zone Group II	Pool A	19 April 2012	Guadalajara, Mexico	Trinidad and Tobago	Clay	Kirsten-Andrea Weedon	Anneliese Rose; Breana Stampfli	L	3–6, 2–6
2015 Fed Cup; Americas Zone Group II	Pool D	26 June 2015	Santo Domingo, Dominican Republic	Puerto Rico	Hard	Kirsten-Andrea Weedon	Mónica Matías; Ariana Rodriguez	W	6–1, 6–2
2017 Fed Cup; Americas Zone Group II	Pool B	20 July 2017	Panama City, Panama	Barbados	Clay	Melissa Morales	Kiana Marshall; Cherise Slocombe	W	6–4, 6–4
2017 Fed Cup; Americas Zone Group II	Pool B	21 July 2017	Panama City, Panama	Dominican Republic	Clay	Melissa Morales	Laura Lissette Quezada Martínez; Michelle Marie Valdez	W	6–3, 6–0
2017 Fed Cup; Americas Zone Group II	Promotional Play-off	22 July 2017	Panama City, Panama	Peru	Clay	Melissa Morales	Bianca Botto; Anastasia Iamachkine	W	6–2, 7–5
2018 Fed Cup; Americas Zone Group I	Pool B	7 February 2018	Asunción, Paraguay	Argentina	Clay	Melissa Morales	María Irigoyen; Stephanie Petit	L	4–6, 1–6
