= 2010 Fed Cup Americas Zone Group II – Pool B =

Group B of the 2010 Fed Cup Americas Zone Group II was one of two pools in the Americas Zone Group II of the 2010 Fed Cup. Five teams competed in a round robin competition, with the teams proceeding to their respective sections of the play-offs: the top two teams played for advancement to the 2011 Group I.

		(Guatemala) GUA	(Mexico) MEX	(Peru) PER	(Panama) PAN	(Bermuda) BER	Match; W–L	Set; W–L	Game; W–L	Standings
55	Guatemala		0–3	0–3	3–0	3–0	2–2	12–12	86–95	3
64	Mexico	3–0		1–2	3–0	3–0	3–1	22–5	148–57	2
66	Peru	3–0	2–1		3–0	3–0	4–0	23–4	153–52	1
82	Panama	0–3	0–3	0–3		1–2	0–4	3–22	57–141	5
85	Bermuda	0–3	0–3	0–3	2–1		1–3	4–21	42–141	4

== Guatemala vs. Panama ==
Guatemala
3
National Tennis Club, Guayaquil, Ecuador
19 April 2010
Clay (outdoors)

Panama
0

			1	2	3
1	(Guatemala) (Panama)	Daniela Schippers; Yeniseik Gómez	6; 0	6; 0
2	(Guatemala) (Panama)	Kirsten Andrea Weedon; Alma Michelle Espinosa Rodríguez	7^{7} 6^{3}	6; 2
3	(Guatemala) (Panama)	Isabella Escobar / Jennifer Pusey; Rosaline Zafir Chávez Tello / Yeniseik Gómez	7^{7} 6^{5}	6; 2

== Mexico vs. Bermuda ==
Mexico
3
National Tennis Club, Guayaquil, Ecuador
19 April 2010
Clay (outdoors)

Bermuda
0

			1	2	3
1	(Mexico) (Bermuda)	Giuliana Olmos; Jacklyn Lambert	6; 0	6; 0
2	(Mexico) (Bermuda)	Alejandra Granillo; Tara Lambert	6; 0	6; 1
3	(Mexico) (Bermuda)	Ximena Hermoso / Daniela Múñoz Gallegos; Jacklyn Lambert / Tara Lambert	6; 0	6; 0

== Guatemala vs. Mexico ==
Guatemala
0
National Tennis Club, Guayaquil, Ecuador
20 April 2010
Clay (outdoors)

Mexico
3

			1	2	3
1	(Guatemala) (Mexico)	Daniela Schippers; Ximena Hermoso	1; 6	2; 6
2	(Guatemala) (Mexico)	Kirsten Andrea Weedon; Alejandra Granillo	2; 6	1; 6
3	(Guatemala) (Mexico)	Isabella Escobar / Daniela Schippers; Ximena Hermoso / Daniela Múñoz Gallegos	2; 6	0; 6

== Peru vs. Panama ==
Peru
3
National Tennis Club, Guayaquil, Ecuador
20 April 2010
Clay (outdoors)

Panama
0

			1	2	3
1	(Peru) (Panama)	Patricia Kú Flores; Rosaline Zafir Chávez Tello	6; 1	6; 2
2	(Peru) (Panama)	Bianca Botto; Alma Michelle Espinosa Rodríguez	6; 0	6; 1
3	(Peru) (Panama)	Bianca Botto / Ximena Siles Luna; Rosaline Zafir Chávez Tello / Yeniseik Gómez	6; 1	6; 1

== Guatemala vs. Peru ==
Guatemala
0
National Tennis Club, Guayaquil, Ecuador
21 April 2010
Clay (outdoors)

Peru
3

			1	2	3
1	(Guatemala) (Peru)	Isabella Escobar; Patricia Kú Flores	1; 6	1; 6
2	(Guatemala) (Peru)	Daniela Schippers; Bianca Botto	0; 6	1; 6
3	(Guatemala) (Peru)	Jennifer Pusey / Kirsten Andrea Weedon; Bianca Botto / Ximena Siles Luna	0; 6	0; 6

== Panama vs. Bermuda ==
Panama
1
National Tennis Club, Guayaquil, Ecuador
21 April 2010
Clay (outdoors)

Bermuda
2

			1	2	3
1	(Panama) (Bermuda)	Rosaline Zafir Chávez Tello; Caitlin Gordon	2; 6	6; 2	0; 6
2	(Panama) (Bermuda)	Alma Michelle Espinosa Rodríguez; Jacklyn Lambert	6; 3	6; 2
3	(Panama) (Bermuda)	Alma Michelle Espinosa Rodríguez / Yeniseik Gómez; Jacklyn Lambert / Tara Lambert	4; 6	2; 6

== Mexico vs. Panama ==
Mexico
3
National Tennis Club, Guayaquil, Ecuador
22 April 2010
Clay (outdoors)

Panama
0

			1	2	3
1	(Mexico) (Panama)	Giuliana Olmos; Yeniseik Gómez	6; 0	6; 2
2	(Mexico) (Panama)	Alejandra Granillo; Alma Michelle Espinosa Rodríguez	6; 0	6; 1
3	(Mexico) (Panama)	Ximena Hermoso / Daniela Múñoz Gallegos; Rosaline Zafir Chávez Tello / Yeniseik Gómez	6; 0	6; 0

== Peru vs. Bermuda ==
Peru
3
National Tennis Club, Guayaquil, Ecuador
22 April 2010
Clay (outdoors)

Bermuda
0

			1	2	3
1	(Peru) (Bermuda)	Mariana Demichelli Vergara; Caitlin Gordon	6; 1	6; 2
2	(Peru) (Bermuda)	Bianca Botto; Tara Lambert	6; 0	6; 0
3	(Peru) (Bermuda)	Mariana Demichelli Vergara / Ximena Siles Luna; Jacklyn Lambert / Tara Lambert	6; 0	6; 0

== Mexico vs. Peru ==
Mexico
1
National Tennis Club, Guayaquil, Ecuador
23 April 2010
Clay (outdoors)

Peru
2

			1	2	3
1	(Mexico) (Peru)	Giuliana Olmos; Patricia Kú Flores	1; 6	6; 1	1; 6
2	(Mexico) (Peru)	Ximena Hermoso; Bianca Botto	4; 6	7^{7} 6^{4}	4; 6
3	(Mexico) (Peru)	Alejandra Granillo / Daniela Múñoz Gallegos; Mariana Demichelli Vergara / Ximena Siles Luna	7; 5	4; 6	6; 3

== Guatemala vs. Bermuda ==
Guatemala
3
National Tennis Club, Guayaquil, Ecuador
23 April 2010
Clay (outdoors)

Bermuda
0

			1	2	3
1	(Guatemala) (Bermuda)	Isabella Escobar; Caitlin Gordon	6; 0	6; 0
2	(Guatemala) (Bermuda)	Kirsten Andrea Weedon; Tara Lambert	6; 0	6; 0
3	(Guatemala) (Bermuda)	Jennifer Pusey / Daniela Schippers; Jacklyn Lambert / Tara Lambert	6; 1	7^{7} 6^{2}

== See also ==
- Fed Cup structure
