= 2012 Fed Cup Americas Zone Group II – play-offs =

The play-offs of the 2012 Fed Cup Americas Zone Group II were the final stages of the Group II Zonal Competition involving teams from the Americas. Using the positions determined in their pools, the seven teams faced off to determine their placing in the 2012 Fed Cup Americas Zone Group II. The top two teams advanced to Group I for the next year.

Placing	Pool A	Pool B
1	Trinidad and Tobago	Chile
2	Guatemala	Mexico
3	Ecuador	Puerto Rico
4	Dominican Republic	Uruguay
5		Costa Rica

== Promotion play-offs ==
The first and second placed teams of each pool were drawn in two head-to-head rounds. The winner of each rounds advanced to Group I for 2013.

=== Trinidad and Tobago vs. Mexico ===
Trinidad and Tobago
0
Club San Javier, Guadalajara, Mexico
21 April 2012
Red clay (outdoors)

Mexico
2

			1	2	3
1	(Trinidad and Tobago) (Mexico)	Anneliese Rose; Marcela Zacarías	1; 6	1; 6
2	(Trinidad and Tobago) (Mexico)	Yolande Leacock; Ana Sofía Sánchez	4; 6	6; 3	1; 6
3	(Trinidad and Tobago) (Mexico)	Yolande Leacock / Anneliese Rose; Ana Paula de la Peña / Marcela Zacarías				not played

=== Chile vs. Guatemala ===
Chile
2
Club San Javier, Guadalajara, Mexico
21 April 2012
Red clay (outdoors)

Guatemala
0

			1	2	3
1	(Chile) (Guatemala)	Cecilia Costa Melgar; Kirsten-Andrea Weedon	6; 4	6; 3
2	(Chile) (Guatemala)	Andrea Koch-Benvenuto; Daniela Schippers	6; 1	6; 4
3	(Chile) (Guatemala)	Cecilia Costa Melgar / Camila Silva; Daniela Schippers / Kirsten-Andrea Weedon				not played

== 5th to 6th play-offs ==
The third placed teams of each pool were drawn in head-to-head rounds to find the fifth and sixth placed teams.

=== Ecuador vs. Puerto Rico ===
Ecuador
1
Club San Javier, Guadalajara, Mexico
21 April 2012
Red clay (outdoors)

Puerto Rico
2

			1	2	3
1	(Ecuador) (Puerto Rico)	Rafaela Gómez; Yolimar Ogando	6; 3	2; 6	1; 6
2	(Ecuador) (Puerto Rico)	Paula Castro; Monica Puig	1; 6	0; 6
3	(Ecuador) (Puerto Rico)	Paula Castro / Joselyn Margarita Tréyes Albarracín; Erica Braschi / Ana Sofía Cordero	1; 6	6; 3	6; 1

== 7th to 8th play-offs ==
The fourth placed teams of each pool were drawn in head-to-head rounds to find the seventh and eighth placed teams.

=== Dominican Republic vs. Uruguay ===
Dominican Republic
1
Club San Javier, Guadalajara, Mexico
21 April 2012
Red clay (outdoors)

Uruguay
2

			1	2	3
1	(Dominican Republic) (Uruguay)	Karla Portalatín; Sara Quiroga	1; 6	0; 6
2	(Dominican Republic) (Uruguay)	Michelle Marie Valdez; María José Pintos	6; 2	6; 2
3	(Dominican Republic) (Uruguay)	Joelle Schad / Michelle Marie Valdez; Sara Quiroga / Virginia Sadi	4; 6	4; 6

== Final Placements ==
Placing	Teams
Promoted	Mexico
Promoted	Chile
Third	Trinidad and Tobago
Third	Guatemala
Fifth	Puerto Rico
Sixth	Ecuador
Seventh	Uruguay
Eighth	Dominican Republic
Ninth	Costa Rica

- Mexico and Chile advanced to 2013 Fed Cup Americas Zone Group I.

== See also ==
- Fed Cup structure
