= 2011 Fed Cup Americas Zone Group II – Pool A =

Group A of the 2011 Fed Cup Americas Zone Group II was one of two pools in the Americas Zone of the 2011 Fed Cup. Five teams competed in a round robin competition, with the teams proceeding to their respective sections of the play-offs: the top two teams play for advancement to the 2012 Group I.

		(Puerto Rico) PUR	(Guatemala) GUA	(Trinidad and Tobago) TRI	(Dominican Republic) DOM	(Uruguay) URU	RR; W–L	Set; W–L	Game; W–L	Standings
47	Puerto Rico		1–2	1–2	2–1	1–2	1–3	10–16	109–138	3
59	Guatemala	2–1		3–0	3–0	2–1	4–0	22–4	148–81	1
65	Trinidad and Tobago	2–1	0–3		1–2	1–2	1–3	9–17	76–127	5
74	Dominican Republic	1–2	0–3	2–1		1–2	1–3	10–16	100–123	4
89	Uruguay	2–1	1–2	2–1	2–1		3–1	14–12	138–102	2

== Puerto Rico vs. Dominican Republic ==
Puerto Rico
2
Centro Nacional de Tenis, Santo Domingo, Dominican Republic
May 16, 2011
Hard (outdoors)

Dominican Republic
1

			1	2	3
1	(Puerto Rico) (Dominican Republic)	Ana Sofía Cordero; Michelle Marie Valdez	0; 6	3; 6
2	(Puerto Rico) (Dominican Republic)	Yolimar Ogando; Chandra Capozzi	6; 4	6; 3
3	(Puerto Rico) (Dominican Republic)	Mara Sofía Martínez-Santori / Yolimar Ogando; Chandra Capozzi / Daysi Espinal	3; 6	6; 3	7^{7} 6^{4}

== Guatemala vs. Trinidad and Tobago ==
Guatemala
3
Centro Nacional de Tenis, Santo Domingo, Dominican Republic
May 16, 2011
Hard (outdoors)

Trinidad and Tobago
0

			1	2	3
1	(Guatemala) (Trinidad and Tobago)	Daniela Schippers; Breana Stampfli	6; 2	6; 2
2	(Guatemala) (Trinidad and Tobago)	Kirsten-Andrea Weedon; Lee-Anne Lingo	6; 0	6; 0
3	(Guatemala) (Trinidad and Tobago)	Daniela Schippers / Paulina Schippers; Trevine Sellier / Breana Stampfli	6; 3	6; 2

== Puerto Rico vs. Uruguay ==
Puerto Rico
1
Centro Nacional de Tenis, Santo Domingo, Dominican Republic
May 17, 2011
Hard (outdoors)

Uruguay
2

			1	2	3
1	(Puerto Rico) (Uruguay)	Monica Matías; Leticia Demichelli	6; 3	7^{7} 6^{2}
2	(Puerto Rico) (Uruguay)	Yolimar Ogando; Carolina de los Santos	6^{5} 7^{7}	6^{5} 7^{7}
3	(Puerto Rico) (Uruguay)	Mara Sofía Martínez-Santori / Yolimar Ogando; Carolina de los Santos / Leticia Demichelli	4; 6	1; 6

== Guatemala vs. Dominican Republic ==
Guatemala
3
Centro Nacional de Tenis, Santo Domingo, Dominican Republic
May 17, 2011
Hard (outdoors)

Dominican Republic
0

			1	2	3
1	(Guatemala) (Dominican Republic)	Daniela Schippers; Davsi Espinal	6; 0	6; 0
2	(Guatemala) (Dominican Republic)	Kirsten-Andrea Weedon; Michelle Marie Valdez	6; 3	6; 1
3	(Guatemala) (Dominican Republic)	Daniela Schippers / Paulina Schippers; Davsi Espinal / Joelle Schad	6; 2	4; 6	6; 3

== Guatemala vs. Uruguay ==
Guatemala
2
Centro Nacional de Tenis, Santo Domingo, Dominican Republic
May 18, 2011
Hard (outdoors)

Uruguay
1

			1	2	3
1	(Guatemala) (Uruguay)	Daniela Schippers; Leticia Demichelli	6; 2	6; 2
2	(Guatemala) (Uruguay)	Kirsten-Andrea Weedon; Carolina de los Santos	4; 6	1; 6
3	(Guatemala) (Uruguay)	Daniela Schippers / Paulina Schippers; Carolina de los Santos / Leticia Demichelli	5; 7	7; 5	7; 5

== Dominican Republic vs. Trinidad and Tobago ==
Dominican Republic
2
Centro Nacional de Tenis, Santo Domingo, Dominican Republic
May 18, 2011
Hard (outdoors)

Trinidad and Tobago
1

			1	2	3
1	(Dominican Republic) (Trinidad and Tobago)	Michelle Marie Valdez; Breana Stampfli	2; 6	3; 6
2	(Dominican Republic) (Trinidad and Tobago)	Chandra Capozzi; Carlista Mohammed	6; 4	6; 1
3	(Dominican Republic) (Trinidad and Tobago)	Daysi Espinal / Joelle Schad; Lee-Anne Lingo / Carlista Mohammed	6; 2	6; 1

== Puerto Rico vs. Trinidad and Tobago ==
Puerto Rico
1
Centro Nacional de Tenis, Santo Domingo, Dominican Republic
May 19, 2011
Hard (outdoors)

Trinidad and Tobago
2

			1	2	3
1	(Puerto Rico) (Trinidad and Tobago)	Monica Matías; Breana Stampfli	1; 6	2; 6
2	(Puerto Rico) (Trinidad and Tobago)	Yolimar Ogando; Carlista Mohammed	4; 6	6; 2	6; 1
3	(Puerto Rico) (Trinidad and Tobago)	Ana Sofía Cordero / Monica Matías; Carlista Mohammed / Breana Stampfli	2; 6	3; 6

== Dominican Republic vs. Uruguay ==
Dominican Republic
1
Centro Nacional de Tenis, Santo Domingo, Dominican Republic
May 19, 2011
Hard (outdoors)

Uruguay
2

			1	2	3
1	(Dominican Republic) (Uruguay)	Daysi Espinal; Carolina de los Santos	2; 6	0; 6
2	(Dominican Republic) (Uruguay)	Chandra Capozzi; Cecilia Mercier	7; 5	6; 2
3	(Dominican Republic) (Uruguay)	Daysi Espinal / Joelle Schad; Carolina de los Santos / Virginia Sadi	5; 7	2; 6

== Puerto Rico vs. Guatemala ==
Puerto Rico
1
Centro Nacional de Tenis, Santo Domingo, Dominican Republic
May 20, 2011
Hard (outdoors)

Guatemala
2

			1	2	3
1	(Puerto Rico) (Guatemala)	Ana Sofía Cordero; Paulina Schippers	3; 6	0; 6
2	(Puerto Rico) (Guatemala)	Yolimar Ogando; Daniela Schippers	7^{7} 6^{4}	7; 5
3	(Puerto Rico) (Guatemala)	Mara Sofía Martínez-Santori / Yolimar Ogando; Paulina Schippers / Kirsten-Andrea Weedon	6^{5} 7^{7}	1; 6

== Trinidad and Tobago vs. Uruguay ==
Trinidad and Tobago
1
Centro Nacional de Tenis, Santo Domingo, Dominican Republic
May 20, 2011
Hard (outdoors)

Uruguay
2

			1	2	3
1	(Trinidad and Tobago) (Uruguay)	Breana Stampfli; Leticia Demichelli	6; 4	2; 6	6; 4
2	(Trinidad and Tobago) (Uruguay)	Carlista Mohammed; Carolina de los Santos	0; 6	0; 6
3	(Trinidad and Tobago) (Uruguay)	Carlista Mohammed / Breana Stampfli; Carolina de los Santos / Virginia Sadi	0; 6	0; 6

== See also ==
- Fed Cup structure
