= 2017 Fed Cup Americas Zone Group II – Pool B =

Subsection of tennis competition

Pool B of the 2017 Fed Cup Americas Group II was one of four pools in the Americas Group II of the 2017 Fed Cup. Three teams competed in a round robin competition, with the top team and bottom teams proceeding to their respective sections of the play-offs: the top team played for advancement to Group I.

== Standings ==
| | | GUA | DOM | BAR | RR; W–L | Set; W–L | Game; W–L | Standings |
| 51 | Guatemala | | 3–0 | 3–0 | 2–0 | 12–1 (92%) | 77–30 (72%) | 1 |
| 58 | Dominican Republic | 0–3 | | 3–0 | 1–1 | 7–6 (54%) | 57–48 (54%) | 2 |
| 80 | Barbados | 0–3 | 0–3 | | 0–2 | 0–12 (0%) | 16–72 (18%) | 3 |

Standings are determined by: 1. number of wins; 2. number of matches; 3. in two-team ties, head-to-head records; 4. in three-team ties, (a) percentage of sets won (head-to-head records if two teams remain tied), then (b) percentage of games won (head-to-head records if two teams remain tied), then (c) Fed Cup rankings.

== Round-robin ==
=== Dominican Republic vs. Barbados ===
Dominican Republic
3
Centro de Alto Rendimiento Fred Maduro, Panama City, Panama
19 July 2017
Clay

Barbados
0

| | | | 1 | 2 | 3 |
|---|---|---|---|---|---|
| 1 | (Dominican Republic) (Barbados) | Kelly Williford; Kayla Frost | 6; 2 | 6; 0 |
| 2 | (Dominican Republic) (Barbados) | Michelle Marie Valdez; Cherise Slocombe | 6; 2 | 6; 1 |
| 3 | (Dominican Republic) (Barbados) | Karla Portalatin / Laura Lissette Quezada Martínez; Kayla Frost / Cherise Slocombe | 6; 1 | 6; 1 |

=== Guatemala vs. Barbados ===
Guatemala
3
Centro de Alto Rendimiento Fred Maduro, Panama City, Panama
20 July 2017
Clay

Barbados
0

| | | | 1 | 2 | 3 |
|---|---|---|---|---|---|
| 1 | (Guatemala) (Barbados) | Melissa Morales; Cherise Slocombe | 6; 0 | 6; 1 |
| 2 | (Guatemala) (Barbados) | Andrea Weedon; Kiana Marshall | 6; 0 | 6; 0 |
| 3 | (Guatemala) (Barbados) | Melissa Morales / Daniela Schippers; Kiana Marshall / Cherise Slocombe | 6; 4 | 6; 4 |

=== Guatemala vs. Dominican Republic ===
Guatemala
3
Centro de Alto Rendimiento Fred Maduro, Panama City, Panama
21 July 2017
Clay

Dominican Republic
0

| | | | 1 | 2 | 3 |
|---|---|---|---|---|---|
| 1 | (Guatemala) (Dominican Republic) | Daniela Schippers; Karla Portalatin | 6; 1 | 6; 2 |
| 2 | (Guatemala) (Dominican Republic) | Andrea Weedon; Kelly Williford | 6; 4 | 4; 6 | 7; 5 |
| 3 | (Guatemala) (Dominican Republic) | Melissa Morales / Daniela Schippers; Laura Lisette Quezada Martínez / Michelle Marie Valdez | 6; 3 | 6; 0 |

== See also ==
- Fed Cup structure
