= Tennis at the 2018 Central American and Caribbean Games =

- Venue: Parque Distrital de Raquetas
- Location: (Colombia) Barranquilla
- Dates: 27 July – 2 August

The tennis competition at the 2018 Central American and Caribbean Games was held in Barranquilla, Colombia from 27 July to 2 August at the Parque Distrital de Raquetas.

== Medal summary ==
=== Men's events ===
Event	Gold	Silver	Bronze
Singles	Víctor Estrella Burgos (DOM)	Roberto Cid Subervi (DOM)	Alejandro González (COL)
Doubles	Dominican Republic (DOM); Roberto Cid Subervi; Víctor Estrella Burgos	Guatemala (GUA); Christopher Díaz Figueroa; Wilfredo González	Colombia (COL); Nicolás Mejía; Eduardo Struvay
Team	Dominican Republic (DOM); Roberto Cid Subervi; Víctor Estrella Burgos; Nick Hardt; José Olivares	Guatemala (GUA); Christopher Díaz Figueroa; Stefan González; Wilfredo González	Colombia (COL); Alejandro González; Sergio Hernández; Nicolás Mejía; Eduardo Struvay

=== Women's events ===
Event	Gold	Silver	Bronze
Singles	Monica Puig (PUR)	Mariana Duque Mariño (COL)	Giuliana Olmos (MEX)
Doubles	Mexico (MEX); Fernanda Contreras; Giuliana Olmos	Colombia (COL); Mariana Duque Mariño; Camila Osorio	Puerto Rico (PUR); Mónica Matías; Monica Puig
Team	Colombia (COL); Mariana Duque Mariño; María Herazo González; Camila Osorio; María Paulina Pérez	Mexico (MEX); Fernanda Contreras; Giuliana Olmos; Andrea Renee Villarreal	Guatemala (GUA); Melissa Morales; María Rivera; Daniela Schippers; Kirsten-Andrea Weedon

=== Mixed event ===
Event	Gold	Silver	Bronze
Doubles	Colombia (COL); Eduardo Struvay; María Paulina Pérez	Dominican Republic (DOM); José Olivares; Kelly Williford	Mexico (MEX); Alan Núñez Aguilera; Andrea Renee Villarreal

=== Medal table ===
* Host nation (Colombia)

Rank	Nation	Gold	Silver	Bronze	Total
1	Dominican Republic (DOM)	3	2	0	5
2	Colombia (COL)*	2	2	3	7
3	Mexico (MEX)	1	1	2	4
4	Puerto Rico (PUR)	1	0	1	2
5	Guatemala (GUA)	0	2	1	3
Totals (5 entries)		7	7	7	21

== Men's singles ==
=== Seeds ===
1. (Dominican Republic) Víctor Estrella Burgos (champion; gold medalist)
2. (Dominican Republic) Roberto Cid Subervi (final; silver medalist)
3. (Colombia) Alejandro González (semifinals; bronze medalist)
4. (Guatemala) Christopher Díaz Figueroa (semifinals; fourth place)
5. (Guatemala) Wilfredo González (quarterfinals)
6. (Antigua and Barbuda) Jody Maginley (first round)
7. (Mexico) Alex Hernández (quarterfinals)
8. (Colombia) Nicolás Mejía (quarterfinals)

=== Draw ===
==== Finals ====
Semifinals
1	(Dominican Republic) Víctor Estrella Burgos	6	1	6
3	(Colombia) Alejandro González	2	6	3
4	(Guatemala) Christopher Díaz Figueroa	4	7	6^{8}
2	(Dominican Republic) Roberto Cid Subervi	6	5	7^{10}

Gold medal match
1	(Dominican Republic) Víctor Estrella Burgos	6	6
2	(Dominican Republic) Roberto Cid Subervi	4	3
Bronze medal match
3	(Colombia) Alejandro González	6^{2}	6	6
4	(Guatemala) Christopher Díaz Figueroa	7^{7}	1	4

==== Top half ====
First round
(El Salvador) L Miralles	4	2
(Panama) W Espinoza	6	6
(Mexico) AF Rubio Fierros	w/o
(Barbados) M Foster-Estwick
(The Bahamas) B Newman	6	7
6	(Antigua and Barbuda) J Maginely	2	5
(Cuba) O Rivera Granja	5	6	[12]
(Curaçao) M-J Every	7	1	[10]
(Grenada) U Ikolo	0	0
(Honduras) A Obando	6	6
(Guadeloupe) N Moinet	0	0
5	(Guatemala) W González	6	6

Second round
1	(Dominican Republic) V Estrella Burgos	6	6
(Panama) W Espinoza	4	4
(Mexico) AF Rubio Fierros	6	6
(The Bahamas) B Newman	1	1
3	(Colombia) A González	6	6
(Cuba) O Rivera Granja	3	0
(Honduras) A Obando	1	4
5	(Guatemala) W González	6	6

Quarterfinals
1	(Dominican Republic) V Estrella Burgos	6	6
(Mexico) A Rubio Fierros	4	4
3	(Colombia) A González	6	6
5	(Guatemala) W González	2	2

Semifinals
1	(Dominican Republic) V Estrella Burgos	6	1	6
3	(Colombia) A González	2	6	3

==== Bottom half ====
First round
7	(Mexico) A Hernández	6	6
(Antigua and Barbuda) C Williams	1	0
(The Bahamas) S Newman	7	3	[10]
(El Salvador) A Alvarado	5	6	[7]
(Panama) M Rodríguez	6	2	[11]
(Grenada) S Alexis	2	6	[9]
8	(Colombia) N Mejía	w/o
(Barbados) X Lawrence
(Honduras) K Turcios	3	7	[10]
(Cuba) O Hernández Moreno	6	6^{5}	6
(Curaçao) R Winklaar	6	6
(Guadeloupe) N Ancedy	3	1

Second round
7	(Mexico) A Hernández	6	6
(The Bahamas) S Newman	4	3
(Panama) M Rodríguez	2	1
4	(Guatemala) C Díaz Figueroa	6	6
8	(Colombia) N Mejía	6	6
(Honduras) K Turcios	0	2
(Curaçao) R Winklaar	2	3
2	(Dominican Republic) R Cid Subervi	6	6

Quarterfinals
7	(Mexico) A Hernández	6^{8}	3
4	(Guatemala) C Díaz Figueroa	7	6
8	(Colombia) N Mejía	2	4
2	(Dominican Republic) R Cid Subervi	6	6

Semifinals
4	(Guatemala) C Díaz Figueroa	4	7	6^{8}
2	(Dominican Republic) R Cid Subervi	6	5	7^{10}

== Women's singles ==
=== Seeds ===
1. (Puerto Rico) Monica Puig (champion; gold medalist)
2. (Colombia) Mariana Duque Mariño (final; silver medalist)
3. (Colombia) María Herazo González (quarterfinals)
4. (Mexico) Giuliana Olmos (semifinals; bronze medalist)
5. (Guatemala) Kirsten-Andrea Weedon (second round)
6. (Grenada) Akilah James (quarterfinals)
7. (The Bahamas) Kerrie Cartwright (quarterfinals)
8. (Dominican Republic) Kelly Williford (second round)

=== Draw ===
==== Finals ====
Semifinals
1	(Puerto Rico) Monica Puig	6	6
(Trinidad and Tobago) Breana Stampfli	1	2
4	(Mexico) Giuliana Olmos	4	2
2	(Colombia) Mariana Duque Mariño	6	6

Gold medal match
1	(Puerto Rico) Monica Puig	6	6
2	(Colombia) Mariana Duque Mariño	1	1
Bronze medal match
(Trinidad and Tobago) Breana Stampfli	1	3
4	(Mexico) Giuliana Olmos	6	6

==== Top half ====
First round
(Antigua and Barbuda) D Raymond	2	1
(Cuba) Y Fors Guerra	6	6
(El Salvador) SV Cruz Bonilla	2	3
(Honduras) NG Espinal Sánchez	6	6
(Trinidad and Tobago) B Stampfli	7	6
(The Bahamas) D Thompson	6^{4}	3

Second round
1	(Puerto Rico) M Puig	6	6
(Cuba) Y Fors Guerra	0	2
(Mexico) F Contreras	3	6	7
5	(Guatemala) K-A Weedon	6	4	5
3	(Colombia) M Herazo	7	6
(Honduras) NG Espinal Sánchez	5	2
(Trinidad and Tobago) B Stampfli	6	4	6
8	(Dominican Republic) K Williford	4	6	0

Quarterfinals
1	(Puerto Rico) M Puig	6	6
(Mexico) F Contreras	4	4
3	(Colombia) M Herazo	1	2
(Trinidad and Tobago) B Stampfli	6	6

Semifinals
1	(Puerto Rico) M Puig	6	6
(Trinidad and Tobago) B Stampfli	1	2

==== Bottom half ====
First round
(Dominican Republic) F Segarelli	5	4
(Puerto Rico) M Matías	7	6
(Guadeloupe) B Mina	5	4
(Guatemala) MG Rivera Corado	7	6
(Antigua and Barbuda) S Kentish	1	0
(Honduras) D Obando	6	6

Second round
7	(The Bahamas) K Cartwright	6	6
(Puerto Rico) M Matías	4	4
(Guatemala) MG Rivera Corado	2	3
4	(Mexico) G Olmos	6	6
6	(Grenada) A James	6	6
(Honduras) D Obando	4	2
(Cuba) I Hernández	0	0
2	(Colombia) M Duque Mariño	6	6

Quarterfinals
7	(The Bahamas) K Cartwright	3	0
4	(Mexico) G Olmos	6	6
6	(Grenada) A James	1	2
2	(Colombia) M Duque Mariño	6	6

Semifinals
4	(Mexico) G Olmos	4	2
2	(Colombia) M Duque Mariño	6	6

== Men's doubles ==
=== Seeds ===
1. (Guatemala) Christopher Díaz Figueroa / Wilfredo González (final; silver medalists)
2. (Dominican Republic) Roberto Cid Subervi / Víctor Estrella Burgos (champions; gold medalists)
3. (Colombia) Nicolás Mejía / Eduardo Struvay (semifinals; bronze medalists)

=== Draw ===
First round
(Guadeloupe) N Ancedy (Guadeloupe) N Moinet	2	2
(The Bahamas) KP Major (The Bahamas) PW Major	6	6
(Honduras) A Obando (Honduras) K Turcios	6^{4}	6	[10]
(Cuba) O Hernández Moreno (Cuba) D Martínez	7	3	[8]
(Panama) W Espinoza (Panama) M Rodríguez	6	6
(El Salvador) A Alvarado (El Salvador) L Miralles	4	0
(Mexico) A Hernández (Mexico) A Núñez Aguilera	4	6	[6]
(Antigua and Barbuda) C Bedminster (Antigua and Barbuda) J Maginley	6	4	[10]
(Barbados) M Foster-Estwick (Barbados) X Lawrence	1	6^{7}
(Curaçao) A Gomez Osorio (Curaçao) M Riebel	6	7

Quarterfinals
1	(Guatemala) C Díaz Figueroa (Guatemala) W González	6	6
(The Bahamas) KP Major (The Bahamas) PW Major	4	4
3	(Colombia) N Mejía (Colombia) E Struvay	6	6
(Honduras) A Obando (Honduras) K Turcios	1	0
(Panama) W Espinoza (Panama) M Rodríguez	6^{6}	4
(Antigua and Barbuda) C Bedminster (Antigua and Barbuda) J Maginley	7	6
(Curaçao) A Gomez Osorio (Curaçao) M Riebel	4	4
2	(Dominican Republic) R Cid Subervi (Dominican Republic) V Estrella Burgos	6	6

Semifinals
1	(Guatemala) C Díaz Figueroa (Guatemala) W González	6	6
3	(Colombia) N Mejía (Colombia) E Struvay	3	3
(Antigua and Barbuda) C Bedminster (Antigua and Barbuda) J Maginley	3	1
2	(Dominican Republic) R Cid Subervi (Dominican Republic) V Estrella Burgos	6	6

Gold medal match
1	(Guatemala) C Díaz Figueroa (Guatemala) W González	3	5
2	(Dominican Republic) R Cid Subervi (Dominican Republic) V Estrella Burgos	6	7
Bronze medal match
3	(Colombia) N Mejía (Colombia) E Struvay	6	6
(Antigua and Barbuda) C Bedminster (Antigua and Barbuda) J Maginley	1	2

== Women's doubles ==
=== Seeds ===
1. (Colombia) Mariana Duque Mariño / Camila Osorio (final; silver medalists)
2. (Guatemala) Melissa Morales / Kirsten-Andrea Weedon (quarterfinals)

=== Draw ===
First round
(Mexico) F Contreras (Mexico) G Olmos	6	6
(Dominican Republic) K Portalatin (Dominican Republic) LL Quezada Martínez	3	1

Quarterfinals
1	(Colombia) M Duque Mariño (Colombia) C Osorio	6	6
(Cuba) Y Fors Guerra (Cuba) Y Smith Dias	2	4
(The Bahamas) S Pratt (The Bahamas) D Thompson	6	6
(Antigua and Barbuda) D Raymond (Antigua and Barbuda) A Williams	4	1
(Mexico) F Contreras (Mexico) G Olmos	6	6
(Honduras) D Obando (Honduras) AG Zavala Mata	2	0
(Puerto Rico) M Matías (Puerto Rico) M Puig	7	6^{4}	[10]
2	(Guatemala) M Morales (Guatemala) K-A Weedon	5	7^{7}	[8]

Semifinals
1	(Colombia) M Duque Mariño (Colombia) C Osorio	6	6
(The Bahamas) S Pratt (The Bahamas) D Thompson	2	1
(Mexico) F Contreras (Mexico) G Olmos	6	7
(Puerto Rico) M Matías (Puerto Rico) M Puig	3	5

Gold medal match
1	(Colombia) M Duque Mariño (Colombia) C Osorio	6	3	[4]
(Mexico) F Contreras (Mexico) G Olmos	4	6	[10]
Bronze medal match
(The Bahamas) S Pratt (The Bahamas) D Thompson	2	0
(Puerto Rico) M Matías (Puerto Rico) M Puig	6	6

== Mixed doubles ==
=== Seeds ===
1. (Dominican Republic) José Olivares / Kelly Williford (final; silver medalists)
2. (Colombia) Eduardo Struvay / María Paulina Pérez (champions; gold medalists)

=== Draw ===
First round
(El Salvador) R González (El Salvador) SV Cruz Bonilla	6	2	[5]
(Mexico) A Núñez Aguilera (Mexico) AR Villarreal	4	6	[10]

Quarterfinals
1	(Dominican Republic) J Olivares (Dominican Republic) K Williford	6	6
(Honduras) J Hernández (Honduras) D Obando	1	2
(Guatemala) SE González (Guatemala) D Schippers	6	7^{7}
(Cuba) O Rivera Granja (Cuba) Y Smith Dias	2	6^{3}
(Mexico) A Núñez Aguilera (Mexico) AR Villarreal	6	6
(Grenada) S Alexis (Grenada) A James	3	2
(The Bahamas) PW Major (The Bahamas) K Cartwright	3	4
2	(Colombia) E Struvay (Colombia) MP Pérez	6	6

Semifinals
1	(Dominican Republic) J Olivares (Dominican Republic) K Williford	7^{7}	6
(Guatemala) SE González (Guatemala) D Schippers	6^{4}	3
(Mexico) A Núñez Aguilera (Mexico) AR Villarreal	3	3
2	(Colombia) E Struvay (Colombia) MP Pérez	6	6

Gold medal match
1	(Dominican Republic) J Olivares (Dominican Republic) K Williford	6^{2}	2
2	(Colombia) E Struvay (Colombia) MP Pérez	7^{7}	6
Bronze medal match
(Guatemala) SE González (Guatemala) D Schippers	6	3	[3]
(Mexico) A Núñez Aguilera (Mexico) AR Villarreal	3	6	[10]

== Men's team ==
=== Seeds ===
1. Dominican Republic (champion; gold medal)
2. Colombia (semifinals; bronze medal)
3. Guatemala (final; silver medal)
4. Mexico (semifinals; fourth place)

=== Draw ===
Quarterfinals
1	Dominican Republic	2
Bahamas	0
4	Mexico	2
Honduras	0
Antigua and Barbuda	0
3	Guatemala	2
Cuba	0
2	Colombia	2

Semifinals
1	Dominican Republic	2
4	Mexico	0
3	Guatemala	2
2	Colombia	1

Gold medal match
1	Dominican Republic	2
3	Guatemala	0
Bronze medal match
4	Mexico	0
2	Colombia	2

=== Quarterfinals ===
Dominican Republic
2

31 July
Hard
Bahamas
0

		1	2	3
1	(Dominican Republic) Nick Hardt (The Bahamas) Phillip Wilbert Major	6; 3	4; 6	6; 3
2	(Dominican Republic) José Olivares (The Bahamas) Baker Newman	6; 4	7; 5
3	(Dominican Republic) Nick Hardt / José Olivares (The Bahamas) Kevin Philip Major / Spencer Newman				not played

Mexico
2

31 July
Hard
Honduras
0

		1	2	3
1	(Mexico) Alan Rubio (Honduras) Keny Turcios	6; 2	6; 2
2	(Mexico) Alex Hernández (Honduras) Alejandro Obando	6; 2	6; 1
3	(Mexico) Alex Hernández / Alan Rubio (Honduras) Justin Hernández / Alejandro Obando				not played

Antigua and Barbuda
0

31 July
Hard
Guatemala
2

		1	2	3
1	(Antigua and Barbuda) Cordell Williams (Guatemala) Wilfredo González	2; 6	0; 6
2	(Antigua and Barbuda) Jody Maginley (Guatemala) Christopher Díaz	4; 6	3; 6
3	(Antigua and Barbuda) Jody Maginley / Cordell Williams (Guatemala) Stefan González / Wilfredo González				not played

Cuba
0

31 July
Hard
Colombia
2

		1	2	3
1	(Cuba) Omar Hernández (Colombia) Nicolás Mejía	2; 6	1; 6
2	(Cuba) Osmel Rivera (Colombia) Sergio Hernández	2; 6	6; 6
3	(Cuba) Denilso Martínez / Osmel Rivera (Colombia) Nicolás Mejía / Eduardo Struvay				not played

=== Semifinals ===
Dominican Republic
2

1 August
Hard
Mexico
0

		1	2	3
1	(Dominican Republic) Roberto Cid (Mexico) Alan Rubio	6; 3	6; 2
2	(Dominican Republic) Víctor Estrella (Mexico) Alex Hernández	6; 3	7^{7} 6^{2}
3	(Dominican Republic) Roberto Cid / Víctor Estrella (Mexico) Alex Hernández / Alan Rubio				not played

Guatemala
2

1 August
Hard
Colombia
1

		1	2	3
1	(Guatemala) Wilfredo González (Colombia) Eduardo Struvay	6; 4	3; 6	6; 0
2	(Guatemala) Christopher Díaz (Colombia) Alejandro González	1; 6	1; 6
3	(Guatemala) Christopher Díaz / Wilfredo González (Colombia) Alejandro González / Nicolás Mejía	6; 3	3; 6	[10] [6]

=== Bronze medal match ===
Mexico
0

2 August
Hard
Colombia
2

		1	2	3
1	(Mexico) Alan Rubio (Colombia) Nicolás Mejía	6^{5} 7^{7}	4; 6
2	(Mexico) Alex Hernández (Colombia) Alejandro González	5; 7	3; 6
3	(Mexico) Alex Hernández / Alan Rubio (Colombia) Nicolás Mejía / Eduardo Struvay				not played

=== Gold medal match ===
Dominican Republic
2

2 August
Hard
Guatemala
0

		1	2	3
1	(Dominican Republic) Roberto Cid (Guatemala) Wilfredo González	6; 2	6; 4
2	(Dominican Republic) Víctor Estrella (Guatemala) Christopher Díaz	6; 2	6; 4
3	(Dominican Republic) Roberto Cid / Víctor Estrella (Guatemala) Christopher Díaz / Wilfredo González				not played

== Women's team ==
=== Seeds ===
1. Colombia (champion; gold medal)
2. Mexico (final; silver medal)
3. Bahamas (semifinals; fourth place)
4. Dominican Republic (quarterfinals)

=== Draw ===
Quarterfinals
1	Colombia	2
Honduras	0
3	Bahamas	2
Antigua and Barbuda	0
Guatemala	2
4	Dominican Republic	0
Cuba	0
2	Mexico	2

Semifinals
1	Colombia	2
3	Bahamas	0
Guatemala	0
2	Mexico	2

Gold medal match
1	Colombia	2
2	Mexico	0
Bronze medal match
3	Bahamas	0
Guatemala	2

=== Quarterfinals ===
Colombia
2

31 July
Hard
Honduras
0

		1	2	3
1	(Colombia) Camila Osorio (Honduras) Daniela Obando	6; 1	6; 3
2	(Colombia) María Herazo González (Honduras) Natalie Espinal	6; 1	6; 3
3	(Colombia) Camila Osorio / María Paulina Pérez (Honduras) Daniela Obando / Ana Zavala				not played

Bahamas
2

31 July
Hard
Antigua and Barbuda
0

		1	2	3
1	(The Bahamas) Danielle Thompson (Antigua and Barbuda) Alicia Williams	6; 1	6; 4
2	(The Bahamas) Kerrie Cartwright (Antigua and Barbuda) D'Jeri Raymond	6; 1	6; 1
3	(The Bahamas) Kerrie Cartwright / Simone Pratt (Antigua and Barbuda) Selene Kentish / D'Jeri Raymond				not played

Guatemala
2

31 July
Hard
Dominican Republic
0

		1	2	3
1	(Guatemala) María Rivera (Dominican Republic) Francesca Segarelli	6; 3	6; 2
2	(Guatemala) Kirsten-Andrea Weedon (Dominican Republic) Kelly Williford	6; 2	6; 2
3	(Guatemala) Melissa Morales / Kirsten-Andrea Weedon (Dominican Republic) Francesca Segarelli / Kelly Williford				not played

Cuba
0

31 July
Hard
Mexico
2

		1	2	3
1	(Cuba) Yamile Fors (Mexico) Fernanda Contreras	0; 6	0; 6
2	(Cuba) Yusleydis Smith (Mexico) Giuliana Olmos	1; 6	3; 6
3	(Cuba) Yamile Fors / Yusleydis Smith (Mexico) Fernanda Contreras / Giuliana Olmos				not played

=== Semifinals ===
Colombia
2

1 August
Hard
Bahamas
0

		1	2	3
1	(Colombia) Camila Osorio (The Bahamas) Simone Pratt	6; 0	6; 0
2	(Colombia) María Herazo González (The Bahamas) Kerrie Cartwright	2; 6	6; 4	6; 2
3	(Colombia) Camila Osorio / María Paulina Pérez (The Bahamas) Kerrie Cartwright / Danielle Thompson				not played

Guatemala
0

1 August
Hard
Mexico
2

		1	2	3
1	(Guatemala) María Rivera (Mexico) Fernanda Contreras	3; 6	2; 6
2	(Guatemala) Kirsten-Andrea Weedon (Mexico) Giuliana Olmos	3; 6	2; 6
3	(Guatemala) Melissa Morales / Kirsten-Andrea Weedon (Mexico) Fernanda Contreras / Giuliana Olmos				not played

=== Bronze medal match ===
Bahamas
0

2 August
Hard
Guatemala
2

		1	2	3
1	(The Bahamas) Danielle Thompson (Guatemala) Melissa Morales	3; 6	6; 3	0; 6
2	(The Bahamas) Kerrie Cartwright (Guatemala) Kirsten-Andrea Weedon	0; 6	0; 6
3	(The Bahamas) Kerrie Cartwright / Simone Pratt (Guatemala) Kirsten-Andrea Weedon / Daniela Schippers				not played

=== Gold medal match ===
Colombia
2

2 August
Hard
Mexico
0

		1	2	3
1	(Colombia) Camila Osorio (Mexico) Fernanda Contreras	6; 2	6; 3
2	(Colombia) Mariana Duque (Mexico) Giuliana Olmos	7^{7} 6^{4}	2; 6	6; 4
3	(Colombia) Mariana Duque / María Paulina Pérez (Mexico) Fernanda Contreras / Giuliana Olmos				not played
