= 2012 Fed Cup Americas Zone Group II – Pool A =

Group A of the 2012 Fed Cup Americas Zone Group II was one of two pools in the Americas zone of the 2012 Fed Cup. Five teams competed in a round robin competition, with the teams proceeding to their respective sections of the play-offs: the top two teams played for advancement to the 2013 Group I.

		(Guatemala) GUA	(Ecuador) ECU	(Trinidad and Tobago) TRI	(Dominican Republic) DOM	RR; W–L	Set; W–L	Game; W–L	Standings
48	Guatemala		3–0	0–3	3–0	2–1	13–7	102–88	2
50	Ecuador	0–3		0–3	2–1	1–2	6–13	83–105	3
60	Trinidad and Tobago	3–0	3–0		3–0	3–0	17–3	118–55	1
66	Dominican Republic	0–3	1–2	0–3		0–3	3–16	56–111	4

== Guatemala vs. Dominican Republic ==
Guatemala
3
Club San Javier, Guadalajara, Mexico
17 April 2012
Red clay (outdoors)

Dominican Republic
0

			1	2	3
1	(Guatemala) (Dominican Republic)	Kirsten-Andrea Weedon; Luisanna Rodríguez	6; 1	6; 2
2	(Guatemala) (Dominican Republic)	Daniela Schippers; Michelle Marie Valdez	5; 7	7; 5	6; 2
3	(Guatemala) (Dominican Republic)	Daniela Schippers / Camila Ramazzini; Karla Portalatín / Joelle Schad	7; 5	6; 4

== Ecuador vs. Trinidad and Tobago ==
Ecuador
0
Club San Javier, Guadalajara, Mexico
17 April 2012
Red clay (outdoors)

Trinidad and Tobago
3

			1	2	3
1	(Ecuador) (Trinidad and Tobago)	Joselyn Margarita Tréyes Albarracín; Anneliese Rose	6; 2	2; 6	2; 6
2	(Ecuador) (Trinidad and Tobago)	Rafaela Gómez; Yolande Leacock	6; 4	5; 7	0; 3
3	(Ecuador) (Trinidad and Tobago)	Paula Castro / Joselyn Margarita Tréyes Albarracín; Anneliese Rose / Breana Stampfli	3; 6	6^{6} 7^{8}

== Guatemala vs. Ecuador ==
Guatemala
3
Club San Javier, Guadalajara, Mexico
18 April 2012
Red clay (outdoors)

Ecuador
0

			1	2	3
1	(Guatemala) (Ecuador)	Kirsten-Andrea Weedon; Joselyn Margarita Tréyes Albarracín	6; 1	6; 1
2	(Guatemala) (Ecuador)	Daniela Schippers; Paula Castro	6; 2	7^{7} 6^{3}
3	(Guatemala) (Ecuador)	Camila Ramazzini / Paulina Schippers; Rafaela Gómez / Joselyn Margarita Tréyes Albarracín	7^{7} 6^{3}	7; 5

== Trinidad and Tobago vs. Dominican Republic ==
Trinidad and Tobago
3
Club San Javier, Guadalajara, Mexico
18 April 2012
Red clay (outdoors)

Dominican Republic
0

			1	2	3
1	(Trinidad and Tobago) (Dominican Republic)	Anneliese Rose; Luisanna Rodríguez	6; 1	6; 0
2	(Trinidad and Tobago) (Dominican Republic)	Yolande Leacock; Michelle Marie Valdez	6; 0	6; 0
3	(Trinidad and Tobago) (Dominican Republic)	Yolande Leacock / Anneliese Rose; Karla Portalatín / Michelle Marie Valdez	6; 4	6; 0

== Guatemala vs. Trinidad and Tobago ==
Guatemala
0
Club San Javier, Guadalajara, Mexico
19 April 2012
Red clay (outdoors)

Trinidad and Tobago
3

			1	2	3
1	(Guatemala) (Trinidad and Tobago)	Kirsten-Andrea Weedon; Anneliese Rose	1; 6	3; 6
2	(Guatemala) (Trinidad and Tobago)	Daniela Schippers; Yolande Leacock	2; 6	7; 5	2; 6
3	(Guatemala) (Trinidad and Tobago)	Daniela Schippers / Kirsten-Andrea Weedon; Anneliese Rose / Breana Stampfli	3; 6	2; 6

== Ecuador vs. Dominican Republic ==
Ecuador
2
Club San Javier, Guadalajara, Mexico
19 April 2012
Red clay (outdoors)

Dominican Republic
1

			1	2	3
1	(Ecuador) (Dominican Republic)	Rafaela Gómez; Karla Portalatín	6; 4	6; 3
2	(Ecuador) (Dominican Republic)	Paula Castro; Michelle Marie Valdez	6; 3	6; 2
3	(Ecuador) (Dominican Republic)	Rafaela Gómez / Joselyn Margarita Tréyes Albarracín; Karla Portalatín / Michelle Marie Valdez	2; 6	6^{4} 7^{7}

== See also ==
- Fed Cup structure
