= 2009 Fed Cup Americas Zone Group II – Pool B =

Group B of the 2009 Fed Cup Americas Zone Group II was one of two pools in Group II of the Americas zone of the 2009 Fed Cup. Four teams competed in a round robin competition, with the top team advancing to Group I for 2010.

		(Dominican Republic) DOM	(Bolivia) BOL	(Guatemala) GUA	(Trinidad and Tobago) TRI	(Cuba) CUB	Match; W–L	Set; W–L	Game; W–L	Standings
54	Dominican Republic		1–2	2–1	1–2	0–3	1–3	10–16	91–120	4
58	Bolivia	2–1		1–2	3–0	0–3	2–2	15–12	118–111	2
62	Guatemala	1–2	2–1		3–0	0–3	2–2	13–14	115–112	3
67	Trinidad and Tobago	2–1	0–3	0–3		0–3	1–3	4–21	64–138	5
70	Cuba	3–0	3–0	3–0	3–0		4–0	24–1	153–60	1

== Dominican Republic vs. Guatemala ==
Dominican Republic
2
Parque del Este, Santo Domingo, Dominican Republic
21 April 2009
Plexipave (outdoors)

Guatemala
1

			1	2	3
1	(Dominican Republic) (Guatemala)	Chandra Capozzi; Ana Lilyan Guzmán	6; 4	6; 4
2	(Dominican Republic) (Guatemala)	Francesca Segarelli; Paulina Schippers	6; 0	6; 4
3	(Dominican Republic) (Guatemala)	Sally Bogaert Morel / Katherine Hoepelman; Ana Lilyan Guzmán / Kirsten Andrea Weedon	0; 6	1; 6

== Trinidad and Tobago vs. Cuba ==
Trinidad and Tobago
0
Parque del Este, Santo Domingo, Dominican Republic
21 April 2009
Plexipave (outdoors)

Cuba
3

			1	2	3
1	(Trinidad and Tobago) (Cuba)	Lee-Anne Lingo; Yamile Fors Guerra	0; 6	0; 6
2	(Trinidad and Tobago) (Cuba)	Carlista Mohammed; Misleydis Díaz González	0; 6	1; 6
3	(Trinidad and Tobago) (Cuba)	Dayna Grazette / Carlista Mohammed; Lumay Díaz Hernández / Yamile Fors Guerra	5; 7	1; 6

== Dominican Republic vs. Cuba ==
Dominican Republic
0
Parque del Este, Santo Domingo, Dominican Republic
22 April 2009
Plexipave (outdoors)

Cuba
3

			1	2	3
1	(Dominican Republic) (Cuba)	Chandra Capozzi; Yamile Fors Guerra	6^{4} 7^{7}	1; 6
2	(Dominican Republic) (Cuba)	Francesca Segarelli; Misleydis Díaz González	7; 5	1; 6	4; 6
3	(Dominican Republic) (Cuba)	Chandra Capozzi / Francesca Segarelli; Lumay Díaz Hernández / Yamile Fors Guerra	0; 6	1; 6

== Bolivia vs. Trinidad and Tobago ==
Bolivia
3
Parque del Este, Santo Domingo, Dominican Republic
22 April 2009
Plexipave (outdoors)

Trinidad and Tobago
0

			1	2	3
1	(Bolivia) (Trinidad and Tobago)	María Paula Deheza; Dayna Grazette	6; 4	6; 2
2	(Bolivia) (Trinidad and Tobago)	Daniela Trigo; Lee-Anne Lingo	6; 3	6; 4
3	(Bolivia) (Trinidad and Tobago)	María Inés Deheza / María Paula Deheza; Lee-Anne Lingo / Carlista Mohammed	6; 1	6; 2

== Bolivia vs. Cuba ==
Bolivia
0
Parque del Este, Santo Domingo, Dominican Republic
23 April 2009
Plexipave (outdoors)

Cuba
3

			1	2	3
1	(Bolivia) (Cuba)	María Inés Deheza; Yamile Fors Guerra	1; 6	2; 6
2	(Bolivia) (Cuba)	Daniela Trigo; Misleydis Díaz González	1; 6	2; 6
3	(Bolivia) (Cuba)	María Inés Deheza / María Paula Deheza; Lumay Díaz Hernández / Yamile Fors Guerra	6^{3} 7^{7}	6^{4} 7^{7}

== Guatemala vs. Trinidad and Tobago ==
Guatemala
3
Parque del Este, Santo Domingo, Dominican Republic
23 April 2009
Plexipave (outdoors)

Trinidad and Tobago
0

			1	2	3
1	(Guatemala) (Trinidad and Tobago)	Paulina Schippers; Dayna Grazette	6; 2	7; 5
2	(Guatemala) (Trinidad and Tobago)	Kirsten Andrea Weedon; Lee-Anne Lingo	6; 0	6; 1
3	(Guatemala) (Trinidad and Tobago)	Ana Lilyan Guzmán / Kirsten Andrea Weedon; Dayna Grazette / Carlista Mohammed	6; 4	6; 0

== Dominican Republic vs. Trinidad and Tobago ==
Dominican Republic
1
Parque del Este, Santo Domingo, Dominican Republic
24 April 2009
Plexipave (outdoors)

Trinidad and Tobago
2

			1	2	3
1	(Dominican Republic) (Trinidad and Tobago)	Katherine Hoepelman; Dayna Grazette	1; 6	0; 6
2	(Dominican Republic) (Trinidad and Tobago)	Francesca Segarelli; Carlista Mohammed	6; 0	6; 2
3	(Dominican Republic) (Trinidad and Tobago)	Katherine Hoepelman / Francesca Segarelli; Dayna Grazette / Carlista Mohammed	6; 2	6^{5} 7^{7}	3; 6

== Bolivia vs. Guatemala ==
Bolivia
1
Parque del Este, Santo Domingo, Dominican Republic
24 April 2009
Plexipave (outdoors)

Guatemala
2

			1	2	3
1	(Bolivia) (Guatemala)	María Paula Deheza; Ana Lilyan Guzmán	2; 6	6; 1	4; 6
2	(Bolivia) (Guatemala)	Daniela Trigo; Paulina Schippers	7^{8} 6^{6}	5; 7	6; 3
3	(Bolivia) (Guatemala)	María Inés Deheza / María Paula Deheza; Ana Lilyan Guzmán / Kirsten Andrea Weedon	0; 6	6; 2	3; 6

== Dominican Republic vs. Bolivia ==
Dominican Republic
1
Parque del Este, Santo Domingo, Dominican Republic
25 April 2009
Plexipave (outdoors)

Bolivia
2

			1	2	3
1	(Dominican Republic) (Bolivia)	Sally Bogaert Morel; María Paula Deheza	0; 6	1; 6
2	(Dominican Republic) (Bolivia)	Francesca Segarelli; Daniela Trigo	6; 1	6; 0
3	(Dominican Republic) (Bolivia)	Sally Bogaert Morel / Francesca Segarelli; María Inés Deheza / María Paula Deheza	1; 6	0; 6

== Guatemala vs. Cuba ==
Guatemala
0
Parque del Este, Santo Domingo, Dominican Republic
25 April 2009
Plexipave (outdoors)

Cuba
3

			1	2	3
1	(Guatemala) (Cuba)	Ana Lilyan Guzmán; Yamile Fors Guerra	2; 6	2; 6
2	(Guatemala) (Cuba)	Kirsten Andrea Weedon; Misleydis Díaz González	4; 6	2; 6
3	(Guatemala) (Cuba)	Isabella Escobar / Paulina Schippers; Misleydis Díaz González / Lumay Díaz Hernández	0; 6	1; 6

- Cuba placed first in this group and thus advanced to Group I for 2010. They placed last overall, and thus was relegated back to Group II for 2011.

== See also ==
- Fed Cup structure
