= 2011 Fed Cup Americas Zone Group II – Pool B =

Group B of the 2011 Fed Cup Americas Zone Group II was one of two pools in the Americas Zone of the 2011 Fed Cup. Five teams competed in a round robin competition, with the teams proceeding to their respective sections of the play-offs: the top two teams play for advancement to the 2012 Group I.

		(The Bahamas) BAH	(Ecuador) ECU	(Costa Rica) CRC	(Venezuela) VEN	(Panama) PAN	RR; W–L	Set; W–L	Game; W–L	Standings
55	Bahamas		2–0	3–0	0–3	3–0	3–1	17–8	188–82	2
57	Ecuador	0–2		3–0	0–3	3–0	2–2	17–10	129–86	3
70	Costa Rica	0–3	0–3		0–3	3–0	1–3	2–18	86–128	4
75	Venezuela	3–0	3–0	3–0		3–0	4–0	24–2	149–50	1
79	Panama	0–3	0–3	0–3	0–3		0–4	0–18	22–144	5

== Bahamas vs. Venezuela ==
Bahamas
0
Centro Nacional de Tenis, Santo Domingo, Dominican Republic
May 16, 2011
Hard (outdoors)

Venezuela
3

			1	2	3
1	(The Bahamas) (Venezuela)	Kerrie Cartwright; Adriana Pérez	1; 6	5; 7
2	(The Bahamas) (Venezuela)	Larikah Russell; Andrea Gámiz	2; 6	1; 6
3	(The Bahamas) (Venezuela)	Nikkita Fountain / Larikah Russell; Marina Giral Lores / Mariana Muci	3; 6	6; 2	4; 6

== Ecuador vs. Costa Rica ==
Ecuador
3
Centro Nacional de Tenis, Santo Domingo, Dominican Republic
May 16, 2011
Hard (outdoors)

Costa Rica
0

			1	2	3
1	(Ecuador) (Costa Rica)	Alejandra Álvarez; Camila Quesada	6; 1	1; 6	7; 5
2	(Ecuador) (Costa Rica)	Hilda Zuleta Cabrera; Andrea Brenes	6; 4	6^{13} 7^{15}	6; 1
3	(Ecuador) (Costa Rica)	Alejandra Álvarez / Hilda Zuleta Cabrera; Mariella Calderón / Ximena Mino	6; 3	7; 5

== Bahamas vs. Panama ==
Bahamas
3
Centro Nacional de Tenis, Santo Domingo, Dominican Republic
May 17, 2011
Hard (outdoors)

Panama
0

			1	2	3
1	(The Bahamas) (Panama)	Kerrie Cartwright; Dania Navarro	6; 1	6; 1
2	(The Bahamas) (Panama)	Larikah Russell; Rosaline Zafir Chávez Tello	6; 0	6; 1
3	(The Bahamas) (Panama)	Nikkita Fountain / Simone Pratt; Rosaline Zafir Chávez Tello / Dania Navarro	6; 2	6; 2

== Ecuador vs. Venezuela ==
Ecuador
0
Centro Nacional de Tenis, Santo Domingo, Dominican Republic
May 17, 2011
Hard (outdoors)

Venezuela
3

			1	2	3
1	(Ecuador) (Venezuela)	Alejandra Álvarez; Marina Giral Lores	3; 6	1; 6
2	(Ecuador) (Venezuela)	Ana Maria Zuleta; Andrea Gámiz	0; 6	2; 6
3	(Ecuador) (Venezuela)	Alejandra Álvarez / Hilda Zuleta Cabrera; Mariana Muci / Adriana Pérez	4; 6	6; 4	2; 6

== Ecuador vs. Panama ==
Ecuador
3
Centro Nacional de Tenis, Santo Domingo, Dominican Republic
May 18, 2011
Hard (outdoors)

Panama
0

			1	2	3
1	(Ecuador) (Panama)	Alejandra Álvarez; Dania Navarro	6; 2	6; 0
2	(Ecuador) (Panama)	Hilda Zuleta Cabrera; Rosaline Zafir Chávez Tello	6; 0	6; 1
3	(Ecuador) (Panama)	Alejandra Álvarez / Ana Maria Zuleta; Ana Gabriela Meis / Dania Navarro	6; 0	6; 0

== Costa Rica vs. Venezuela ==
Costa Rica
0
Centro Nacional de Tenis, Santo Domingo, Dominican Republic
May 18, 2011
Hard (outdoors)

Venezuela
3

			1	2	3
1	(Costa Rica) (Venezuela)	Mariella Calderón; Adriana Pérez	1; 6	1; 6
2	(Costa Rica) (Venezuela)	Andrea Brenes; Andrea Gámiz	3; 6	0; 6
3	(Costa Rica) (Venezuela)	Ximena Mino / Camila Quesada; Marina Giral Lores / Mariana Muci	2; 6	2; 6

== Bahamas vs. Costa Rica ==
Bahamas
3
Centro Nacional de Tenis, Santo Domingo, Dominican Republic
May 19, 2011
Hard (outdoors)

Costa Rica
0

			1	2	3
1	(The Bahamas) (Costa Rica)	Simone Pratt; Ximena Mino	6; 2	6; 1
2	(The Bahamas) (Costa Rica)	Kerrie Cartwright; Andrea Brenes	6; 2	6; 0
3	(The Bahamas) (Costa Rica)	Nikkita Fountain / Larikah Russell; Mariella Calderón / Camila Quesada	6; 2	6; 2

== Venezuela vs. Panama ==
Ecuador
3
Centro Nacional de Tenis, Santo Domingo, Dominican Republic
May 19, 2011
Hard (outdoors)

Panama
0

			1	2	3
1	(Ecuador) (Panama)	Marina Giral Lores; Gabriela González	6; 0	6; 0
2	(Ecuador) (Panama)	Adriana Pérez; Rosaline Zafir Chávez Tello	6; 0	6; 1
3	(Ecuador) (Panama)	Andrea Gámiz / Mariana Muci; Rosaline Zafir Chávez Tello / Dania Navarro	6; 0	6; 0

== Bahamas vs. Ecuador ==
Bahamas
2
Centro Nacional de Tenis, Santo Domingo, Dominican Republic
May 20, 2011
Hard (outdoors)

Ecuador
0

			1	2	3
1	(The Bahamas) (Ecuador)	Kerrie Cartwright; Alejandra Álvarez	4; 6	6; 4	7; 5
2	(The Bahamas) (Ecuador)	Larikah Russell; Hilda Zuleta Cabrera	6; 3	3; 6	7^{7} 6^{4}
3	(The Bahamas) (Ecuador)	Nikkita Fountain / Larikah Russell; Alejandra Álvarez / Ana Maria Zuleta				not played

== Costa Rica vs. Panama ==
Costa Rica
3
Centro Nacional de Tenis, Santo Domingo, Dominican Republic
May 20, 2011
Hard (outdoors)

Panama
0

			1	2	3
1	(Costa Rica) (Panama)	Mariella Calderón; Dania Navarro	6; 0	6; 2
2	(Costa Rica) (Panama)	Andrea Brenes; Rosaline Zafir Chávez Tello	6; 2	6; 1
3	(Costa Rica) (Panama)	Ximena Mino / Camila Quesada; Rosaline Zafir Chávez Tello / Gabriela González	6; 2	6; 4
