= 2015 Fed Cup Americas Zone Group II – Pool D =

Pool D of the 2015 Fed Cup Americas Group II was one of four pools in the Americas Group II of the 2015 Fed Cup. Three teams competed in a round robin competition, with each team proceeding to their respective sections of the play-offs: the top team played for advancement to the Group I.

== Standings ==
		(Guatemala) GUA	(Puerto Rico) PUR	(Bermuda) BER	RR; W–L	Set; W–L	Game; W–L	Standings
4	Guatemala		2–1	3–0	5–1	11–2	74–27	1
	Puerto Rico	1–2		3–0	4–2	8–5	59–42	2
	Bermuda	0–3	0–3		0–6	0–12	8–72	3

== Round-robin ==
=== Guatemala vs. Bermuda ===
Guatemala
3
Centro Nacional de Tenis, Santo Domingo Este, Dominican Republic
24 June 2015
Hard (outdoors)

Bermuda
0

			1	2	3
1	(Guatemala) (Bermuda)	Daniela Schippers; Cayla Cross	6; 0	6; 0
2	(Guatemala) (Bermuda)	Kirsten-Andrea Weedon; Jacklyn Lambert	6; 2	6; 2
3	(Guatemala) (Bermuda)	Melissa Morales / Camila Ramazzini; Jacklyn Lambert / Zaire Simmons	6; 0	6; 0

=== Puerto Rico vs. Bermuda ===
Puerto Rico
3
Centro Nacional de Tenis, Santo Domingo Este, Dominican Republic
25 June 2015
Hard (outdoors)

Bermuda
0

			1	2	3
1	(Puerto Rico) (Bermuda)	Mónica Matías; Zaire Simmons	6; 0	6; 0
2	(Puerto Rico) (Bermuda)	Ariana Rodríguez; Jacklyn Lambert	6; 2	6; 2
3	(Puerto Rico) (Bermuda)	Julieanne Bou / Erica Braschi; Cayla Cross / Kirstin Saltus	6; 0	6; 0

=== Guatemala vs. Puerto Rico ===
Guatemala
2
Centro Nacional de Tenis, Santo Domingo Este, Dominican Republic
26 June 2015
Hard (outdoors)

Puerto Rico
1

			1	2	3
1	(Guatemala) (Puerto Rico)	Melissa Morales; Mónica Matías	2; 6	6; 3	6^{3} 7^{7}
2	(Guatemala) (Puerto Rico)	Kirsten-Andrea Weedon; Ariana Rodríguez	6; 1	6; 3
3	(Guatemala) (Puerto Rico)	Daniela Schippers / Kirsten-Andrea Weedon; Mónica Matías / Ariana Rodríguez	6; 1	6; 2
