= 2011 Fed Cup Americas Zone =

Subsection of tennis competition

The Americas Zone was one of three zones of regional competition in the 2011 Fed Cup.

== Group I ==
- Venue: National Tennis Centre, Buenos Aires, Argentina (clay, outdoors)
- Date: Week of 31 January (ties played 2–4 February)

The eight teams were divided into two pools of four teams. The winners of both pools played off to decide which nation progresses to World Group II play-offs. Nations finished third and fourth in each pool play-off to determine which nation was relegated to Americas Zone Group II for 2012

=== Pools ===
	Pool A	ARG	PER	PAR	BOL
1	Argentina (2–1)		3–0	1–2	3–0
2	Peru (2–1)	0–3		2–1	3–0
3	Paraguay (2–1)	2–1	1–2		2–1
4	Bolivia (0–3)	0–3	0–3	1–2	

	Pool B	COL	BRA	CHI	MEX
1	Colombia (3–0)		2–1	3–0	3–0
2	Brazil (2–1)	1–2		2–1	3–0
3	Chile (1–2)	0–3	1–2		2–1
4	Mexico (0–3)	0–3	0–3	1–2	

=== Play-offs ===
Placing	A Team	Score	B Team
Promotion	Argentina	3–0	Colombia
3rd–4th	Peru	1–2	Brazil
Relegation	Paraguay	2–1	Mexico
Relegation	Bolivia	2–1	Chile

- Argentina advanced to World Group II play-offs.
- Mexico and Chile were relegated to Americas Group II in 2012.

== Group II ==
- Venue: Venue: Centro Nacional de Tenis, Santo Domingo, Dominican Republic (hard, outdoors)
- Date: Week of 16 May (ties played 16–22 May)

The ten teams were divided into two pools of five teams. The top two teams of both pools played off to decide which nation was promoted to the Americas Zone Group I for 2012.

	Pool A	GUA	URU	PUR	DOM	TRI
1	Guatemala (4–0)		2–1	2–1	3–0	3–0
2	Uruguay (3–1)	1–2		2–1	2–1	2–1
3	Puerto Rico (1–3)	1–2	1–2		2–1	1–2
4	Dominican Republic (1–3)	0–3	1–2	1–2		2–1
5	Trinidad and Tobago (1–3)	0–3	1–2	2–1	1–2	

	Pool B	VEN	BAH	ECU	CRC	PAN
1	Venezuela (4–0)		3–0	3–0	3–0	3–0
2	Bahamas (3–1)	0–3		2–0	3–0	3–0
3	Ecuador (2–2)	0–3	0–2		3–0	3–0
4	Costa Rica (1–3)	0–3	0–3	0–3		3–0
5	Panama (0–4)	0–3	0–3	0–3	0–3	

=== Play-offs ===
Placing	A Team	Score	B Team
Promotion	Guatemala	0–2	Bahamas
Promotion	Uruguay	0–2	Venezuela
5th–6th	Puerto Rico	1–2	Ecuador
7th–8th	Dominican Republic	3–0	Costa Rica
9th–10th	Trinidad and Tobago	2–1	Panama

- Bahamas and Venezuela promoted to Americas Group I in 2012.

== See also ==
- Fed Cup structure
