= 2018 Fed Cup Americas Zone Group I – Pool B =

Subsection of tennis competition

Pool B of the 2018 Fed Cup Americas Zone Group I was one of two pools in the Americas zone of the 2018 Fed Cup. Four teams competed in a round robin competition, with the top team and the bottom team proceeding to their respective sections of the play-offs: the top team played for advancement to the World Group II Play-offs, while the bottom team faced potential relegation to Group II.

== Standings ==
		BRA	ARG	VEN	GUA	RR; W–L	Set; W–L	Game; W–L	Standings
3	Brazil		2–1	2–1	3–0	3–0	15–7 (68%)	115–86 (57%)	1
2	Argentina	1–2		3–0	3–0	2–1	16–7 (70%)	119–85 (58%)	2
6	Venezuela	1–2	0–3		3–0	1–2	10–13 (43%)	106–116 (48%)	3
7	Guatemala	0–3	0–3	0–3		0–3	4–18 (18%)	77–130 (37%)	4

Standings are determined by: 1. number of wins; 2. number of matches; 3. in two-team ties, head-to-head records; 4. in three-team ties, (a) percentage of sets won (head-to-head records if two teams remain tied), then (b) percentage of games won (head-to-head records if two teams remain tied), then (c) Fed Cup rankings.

== Round-robin ==
=== Argentina vs. Guatemala ===
Argentina
3
Club Internacional de Tenis, Asunción, Paraguay
7 February
Clay

Guatemala
0

			1	2	3
1	(Argentina) (Guatemala)	Paula Ormaechea; Daniela Schippers	7; 5	6; 2
2	(Argentina) (Guatemala)	Catalina Pella; Kirsten-Andrea Weedon	6; 0	6^{6} 7^{8}	6; 2
3	(Argentina) (Guatemala)	María Irigoyen / Stephanie Mariel Petit; Melissa Morales / Daniela Schippers	6; 4	6; 1

=== Brazil vs. Venezuela ===
Brazil
2
Club Internacional de Tenis, Asunción, Paraguay
7 February
Clay

Venezuela
1

			1	2	3
1	(Brazil) (Venezuela)	Gabriela Cé; Aymet Uzcátegui	2; 6	6; 2	5; 7
2	(Brazil) (Venezuela)	Beatriz Haddad Maia; Andrea Gámiz	7^{7} 6^{4}	6; 4
3	(Brazil) (Venezuela)	Beatriz Haddad Maia / Luisa Stefani; Andrea Gámiz / Adriana Pérez	6; 1	7; 5

=== Argentina vs. Venezuela ===
Argentina
3
Club Internacional de Tenis, Asunción, Paraguay
8 February
Clay

Venezuela
0

			1	2	3
1	(Argentina) (Venezuela)	Paula Ormaechea; Aymet Uzcátegui	6; 4	1; 6	6; 1
2	(Argentina) (Venezuela)	Catalina Pella; Andrea Gámiz	4; 6	6; 0	6; 1
3	(Argentina) (Venezuela)	María Irigoyen / Stephanie Mariel Petit; Adriana Pérez / Lucielena Pérez	7^{8} 6^{6}	6; 4

=== Brazil vs. Guatemala ===
Brazil
3
Club Internacional de Tenis, Asunción, Paraguay
8 February
Clay

Guatemala
0

			1	2	3
1	(Brazil) (Guatemala)	Nathaly Kurata; Melissa Morales	6; 2	6; 2
2	(Brazil) (Guatemala)	Beatriz Haddad Maia; Kirsten-Andrea Weedon	6; 1	6; 1
3	(Brazil) (Guatemala)	Gabriela Cé / Luisa Stefani; Gabriela Rivera / Kirsten-Andrea Weedon	6; 3	3; 6	7^{7} 6^{3}

=== Argentina vs. Brazil ===
Argentina
1
Club Internacional de Tenis, Asunción, Paraguay
9 February
Clay

Brazil
2

			1	2	3
1	(Argentina) (Brazil)	Paula Ormaechea; Nathaly Kurata	7; 5	6; 0
2	(Argentina) (Brazil)	Catalina Pella; Beatriz Haddad Maia	2; 6	6; 4	4; 6
3	(Argentina) (Brazil)	María Irigoyen / Catalina Pella; Beatriz Haddad Maia / Luisa Stefani	1; 6	6; 3	2; 6

=== Venezuela vs. Guatemala ===
Venezuela
3
Club Internacional de Tenis, Asunción, Paraguay
9 February
Clay

Guatemala
0

			1	2	3
1	(Venezuela) (Guatemala)	Aymet Uzcátegui; Daniela Schippers	6^{5} 7^{7}	6; 3	7^{7} 6^{4}
2	(Venezuela) (Guatemala)	Andrea Gámiz; Kirsten-Andrea Weedon	3; 6	6; 4	6; 2
3	(Venezuela) (Guatemala)	Adriana Pérez / Lucielena Pérez; Melissa Morales / Gabriela Rivera	6; 2	7; 5
