= 2010 Fed Cup =

International women's tennis competition

Details
- Duration: 6 February – 7 November
- Edition: 48th

Achievements (singles)

The 2010 Fed Cup (also known as the 2010 Fed Cup by BNP Paribas for sponsorship purposes) was the 48th edition of the tournament between national teams in women's tennis.

The final took place at the San Diego Sports Arena in San Diego, United States, on 6–7 November. Italy successfully defended their title, in a rematch of the previous year's final, against the United States, by three rubbers to one.

== World Group ==
Participating teams
Czech Republic	France	Germany	Italy
Russia	Serbia	Ukraine	United States

=== Draw ===
Quarterfinals; 6–7 February
Kharkiv, Ukraine (Indoor hard)
1	Italy	4
Ukraine	1
Brno, Czech Republic (Indoor hard)
Germany	2
4	Czech Republic	3
Belgrade, Serbia (Indoor hard)
3	Russia	3
Serbia	2
Lievin, France, (Indoor clay)
France	1
2	United States	4

Semifinals; 24–25 April
Rome, Italy (Outdoor clay)
1	Italy	5
4	Czech Republic	0
Birmingham, United States (Indoor hard)
3	Russia	2
2	United States	3

Final; 6–7 November
San Diego, United States (Indoor hard)
1	Italy	3
2	United States	1

== World Group play-offs ==
The four losing teams in the World Group first round ties (France, Germany, Serbia and Ukraine), and four winners of the World Group II ties (Australia, Belgium, Estonia and Slovakia) enter the draw for the World Group play-offs. Four seeded teams, based on the latest Fed Cup ranking, are drawn against four unseeded teams.

Date: 24–25 April

Venue	Surface	Home team	Score	Visiting team
Grenslandhallen – Ethias Arena, Hasselt, Belgium	Indoor clay	Belgium (1)	3–2	Estonia
Palace of Sports "Lokomotiv", Kharkiv, Ukraine	Indoor clay	Ukraine (2)	0–5	Australia
Frankfurter TC 1914 Palmengarten, Frankfurt, Germany	Outdoor clay	Germany (3)	2–3	France
Belgrade Arena, Belgrade, Serbia	Indoor clay	Serbia (4)	2–3	Slovakia

== World Group II ==
The World Group II was the second highest level of Fed Cup competition in 2010. Winners advanced to the World Group play-offs, and losers played in the World Group II play-offs.

Date: 6–7 February

Venue	Surface	Home team	Score	Visiting team
Memorial Drive Park, Adelaide, Australia	Outdoor hard	Australia	3–2	Spain (1)
Łuczniczka, Bydgoszcz, Poland	Indoor carpet	Poland	2–3	Belgium (3)
Tere Sport Tennis Club, Tallinn, Estonia	Indoor hard	Estonia	4–1	Argentina (4)
Sibamac Arena, Bratislava, Slovakia	Indoor hard	Slovakia	3–2	China (2)

== World Group II play-offs ==
The four losing teams from World Group II (Argentina, China, Poland and Spain) played off against qualifiers from Zonal Group I. Two teams qualified from Europe/Africa Zone (Slovenia and Sweden), one team from the Asia/Oceania Zone (Japan), and one team from the Americas Zone (Canada).

Date: 24–25 April

Venue	Surface	Home team	Score	Visiting team
Sopot Tennis Club, Sopot, Poland	Indoor carpet	Poland	1–4	Spain (1)
Idrottens Hus, Helsingborg, Sweden	Indoor hard	Sweden	3–2	China (2)
Uniprix Stadium, Montreal, Canada	Indoor carpet	Canada	5–0	Argentina (3)
Ljudski vrt, Maribor, Slovenia	Indoor clay	Slovenia	4–1	Japan (4)

== Americas Zone ==
- Nations in **bold** advanced to the higher level of competition.
- Nations in italics were relegated down to a lower level of competition.

=== Group I ===
Venue: Yacht y Golf Club Paraguayo, Lambaré, Paraguay (outdoor clay)

Dates: 3–6 February

Participating teams

- Brazil
- Bolivia
- **Canada**
- Chile
- Colombia
- Cuba
- Paraguay
- Puerto Rico

=== Group II ===
Venue: National Tennis Club, Guayaquil, Ecuador (outdoor clay)

Dates: 19–24 April

Participating teams

- Bahamas
- Bermuda
- Costa Rica
- Dominican Republic
- Ecuador
- Guatemala
- **Mexico**
- Panama
- **Peru**
- Trinidad and Tobago

== Asia/Oceania Zone ==
- Nations in **bold** advanced to the higher level of competition.
- Nations in italics were relegated down to a lower level of competition.

=== Group I ===
Venue: National Tennis Centre, Kuala Lumpur, Malaysia (outdoor hard)

Dates: 3–6 February

Participating teams

- Chinese Taipei
- Indonesia
- **Japan**
- Kazakhstan
- New Zealand
- South Korea
- Thailand
- Uzbekistan

=== Group II ===
Venue: National Tennis Centre, Kuala Lumpur, Malaysia (outdoor hard)

Dates: 3–6 February

Participating teams

- Hong Kong
- **India**
- Kyrgyzstan
- Malaysia
- Philippines
- Singapore
- Syria

== Europe/Africa Zone ==
- Nations in **bold** advanced to the higher level of competition.
- Nations in italics were relegated down to a lower level of competition.

=== Group I ===
Venue: Complexo de Tenis do Jamor, Cruz Quebrada, Portugal (indoor hard)

Dates: 3–6 February

Participating teams

- Austria
- Belarus
- Bosnia and Herzegovina
- Bulgaria
- Croatia
- Denmark
- Great Britain
- Hungary
- Israel
- Latvia
- Netherlands
- Portugal
- Romania
- **Slovenia**
- **Sweden**
- Switzerland

=== Group II ===
Venue: Orange Fitness & Tennis Club, Yerevan, Armenia (outdoor clay)

Dates: 28 April – 1 May

Participating teams

- Armenia
- Finland
- Georgia
- **Greece**
- Liechtenstein
- **Luxembourg**
- Norway
- South Africa

=== Group III ===
Venue: Smash Tennis Academy, Cairo, Egypt (outdoor clay)

Dates: 21–24 April

Participating teams

- Algeria
- Egypt
- Ireland
- Malta
- Moldova
- **Morocco**
- **Turkey**

== Rankings ==
The rankings were measured after the three points during the year that play took place, and were collated by combining points earned from the previous four years.

8 February
Rank	Nation	Points	Move
1	Italy	29,957.5	Steady
2	Russia	27,715.0	Steady
3	United States	15,512.5	Steady
4	Czech Republic	10,097.5	▲1
5	Spain	7,752.5	▼1
6	Belgium	5,055.0	▲4
7	Ukraine	5,037.5	▼1
8	Germany	4,825.0	Steady
9	Serbia	4,805.0	▼2
10	Slovakia	4,537.5	▲3

26 April
Rank	Nation	Points	Move
1	Italy	30,972.5	Steady
2	Russia	24,100.0	Steady
3	United States	20,147.5	Steady
4	Czech Republic	9,560.0	Steady
5	Spain	6,790.0	Steady
6	Slovakia	5,862.5	▲4
7	Australia	5,847.5	▲5
8	Belgium	5,065.0	▼2
9	France	4,837.5	▲2
10	Ukraine	4,225.0	▼3

8 November
Rank	Nation	Points	Move
1	Italy	35,062.5	Steady
2	United States	20,147.5	▲1
3	Russia	20,055.0	▼1
4	Czech Republic	9,560.0	Steady
5	Spain	6,790.0	Steady
6	Slovakia	5,862.5	Steady
7	Australia	5,847.5	Steady
8	Belgium	5,065.0	Steady
9	France	4,837.5	Steady
10	Ukraine	4,225.0	Steady
