= 2012 Fed Cup Americas Zone =

Subsection of tennis competition

The Americas Zone was one of three zones of regional competition in the 2012 Fed Cup.

== Group I ==
- Venue: Graciosa Country Club, Curitiba, Brazil (outdoor clay)
- Date: Week of 30 January

The nine teams were divided into two pools of four and five teams. The winners of both pools played off to decide which nation progresses to World Group II play-offs. Nations finishing in the bottom two places in each pool play-off to determine which nation was relegated to Americas Zone Group II for 2012.

=== Pools ===
	Pool A	ARG	CAN	PER	BAH
1	Argentina (3–0)		3–0	3–0	3–0
2	Canada (2–1)	0–3		2–1	3–0
3	Peru (1–2)	0–3	1–2		3–0
4	Bahamas (0–3)	0–3	0–3	0–3	

	Pool B	COL	PAR	BRA	VEN	BOL
1	Colombia (4–0)		2–1	2–1	3–0	3–0
2	Paraguay (3–1)	1–2		2–1	2–1	3–0
3	Brazil (2–1)	1–2	1–2		2–1	3–0
4	Venezuela (1–3)	0–3	1–2	1–2		3–0
5	Bolivia (0–4)	0–3	0–3	0–3	0–3	

=== Play-offs ===
Placing	Team A	Score	Team B
Promotion	Argentina	2–0	Colombia
3rd–4th	Canada	0–2	Paraguay
5th–6th	N/A	–	Brazil
Relegation	Peru	2–0	Bolivia
Relegation	Bahamas	0–2	Venezuela

- Argentina advanced to World Group II play-offs.
- Bolivia and Bahamas were relegated to Americas Group II in 2013.

== Group II ==
- Venue: Club San Javier, Guadalajara, Mexico (clay, outdoors)
- Date: 16–21 April

The nine teams were divided into one pool of four and one pool of five teams. The top two teams of both pools played off to decide which nation was promoted to the Americas Zone Group I for 2012.

	Pool A	TRI	GUA	ECU	DOM
1	Trinidad and Tobago (3–0)		3–0	3–0	3–0
2	Guatemala (2–1)	0–3		3–0	3–0
3	Ecuador (1–2)	0–3	0–3		2–1
4	Dominican Republic (0–3)	0–3	0–3	1–2	

	Pool B	CHI	MEX	PUR	URU	CRC
1	Chile (3–0)		3–0	2–1	3–0	3–0
2	Mexico (2–1)	0–3		2–1	3–0	3–0
3	Puerto Rico (2–2)	1–2	1–2		2–1	3–0
4	Uruguay (1–2)	0–3	0–3	1–2		2–1
5	Costa Rica (0–3)	0–3	0–3	0–3	1–2	

=== Play-offs ===
Placing	Team A	Score	Team B
Promotion	Trinidad and Tobago	0–2	Mexico
Promotion	Guatemala	0–2	Chile
5th–6th	Ecuador	1–2	Puerto Rico
7th–8th	Dominican Republic	1–2	Uruguay
9th	N/A	–	Costa Rica

- Mexico and Chile were promoted to Americas Group I in 2013.

== See also ==
- Fed Cup structure
