= Padel at the 2026 South American Games =

Padel competitions at the 2026 South American Games

- Venue: Estadio Invencible Rafaela
- Dates: September 22–25
- Competitors: 32 from 8 nations

Padel competitions at the 2026 South American Games in Rosario, Santa Fe, and Rafaela, Argentina, were held between September 22 and 25 at Estadio Invencible Rafaela, located within Distrito Joven in Rafaela.

A total of 2 events were contested (one men's and one women's). Held as a demonstration sport during the 2022 games, the sport was included to the games' official program, giving out medals to the events contested during this edition.

== Medal summary ==
=== Medal table ===
* Host nation (Argentina)

Rank	Nation	Gold	Silver	Bronze	Total
1	Argentina*	1	1	0	2
2	Paraguay	1	0	0	1
3	Chile	0	1	0	1
4	Ecuador	0	0	1	1
4	Uruguay	0	0	1	1
Totals (5 entries)		2	2	2	6

=== Medalists ===
Event	Gold	Silver	Bronze
Men's doubles	Paraguay; Martin Abud; Facundo Dehnike	Argentina; Santino Contreras; Ignacio Piotto	Uruguay; Higor Ensslin; Juan Artia
Women's doubles	Argentina; Victoria Vilchez; María Mosca	Chile; Kimberley Ahumada; Catalina Arancibia	Ecuador; Alejandra Álvarez; Marines Holguín

== Participation ==
Eight nations participated in the padel events of the 2026 South American Games.

- Argentina (4)
- Bolivia (4)
- Chile (4)
- Ecuador (4)
- Paraguay (4)
- Peru (4)
- Uruguay (4)
- Venezuela (4)

== Results ==
=== Men's doubles ===
Group A

Pos	Team	Pld	W	D	L	GF	GA	GD	Pts	Qualification	ARG	CHI	PER	BOL
1	Santino Contreras / Ignacio Piotto (Argentina)	3	3	0	0	6	0	+6	9	Semifinals	—	2–0	2–0	2–0
2	Matías Negrete / Daniel Salinas (Chile)	3	2	0	1	4	2	+2	6	Semifinals	0–2	—	2–0	2–0
3	Octavio Ceballos / Sergio Monges (Peru)	3	1	0	2	2	4	−2	3		0–2	0–2	—	2–0
4	Mateo Torrelio / Claudio Oropeza (Bolivia)	3	0	0	3	0	6	−6	0		0–2	0–2	0–2	—

Group B

Pos	Team	Pld	W	D	L	GF	GA	GD	Pts	Qualification	PAR	URU	VEN	ECU
1	Martín Abud / Facundo Dehnike (Paraguay)	3	3	0	0	6	1	+5	9	Semifinals	—	2–1	2–0	2–0
2	Higor Ensslin / Juan Artia (Uruguay)	3	2	0	1	5	2	+3	6	Semifinals	1–2	—	2–0	2–0
3	Eduardo López / Diego González (Venezuela)	3	1	0	2	2	4	−2	3		0–2	0–2	—	2–0
4	Estéfano Montoya / Frederick Armijos (Ecuador)	3	0	0	3	0	6	−6	0		0–2	0–2	0–2	—

Knockout stage

Semifinals
(Argentina) Ignacio Piotto (Argentina) Santino Contreras	2
(Uruguay) Juan Artia (Uruguay) Higor Ensslin	0
(Paraguay) Martín Abud (Paraguay) Facundo Dehnike	2
(Chile) Daniel Salinas (Chile) Matías Negrete	0

Final
(Paraguay) Martín Abud (Paraguay) Facundo Dehnike	2
(Argentina) Ignacio Piotto (Argentina) Santino Contreras	0
Bronze medal match
(Uruguay) Juan Artia (Uruguay) Higor Ensslin	2
(Chile) Daniel Salinas (Chile) Matías Negrete	0

=== Women's doubles ===
Group A

Pos	Team	Pld	W	D	L	GF	GA	GD	Pts	Qualification	CHI	PER	VEN	BOL
1	Kimberley Ahumada / Catalina Arancibia (Chile)	3	3	0	0	6	0	+6	9	Semifinals	—	2–0	2–0	2–0
2	María Torres / Nicole Aragones (Peru)	3	2	0	1	4	2	+2	6	Semifinals	0–2	—	2–0	2–0
3	Luciana Cogorno / Agatha Hernández (Venezuela)	3	1	0	2	2	4	−2	3		0–2	0–2	—	2–0
4	Micaela Meneses / Michelle Doria (Bolivia)	3	0	0	3	0	6	−6	0		0–2	0–2	0–2	—

Group B

Pos	Team	Pld	W	D	L	GF	GA	GD	Pts	Qualification	ARG	ECU	URU	PAN
1	Victoria Vilches / María Mosca (Argentina)	3	3	0	0	6	0	+6	9	Semifinals	—	2–0	2–0	2–0
2	Alejandra Álvarez / Marines Holguín (Ecuador)	3	2	0	1	4	3	+1	6	Semifinals	0–2	—	2–1	2–0
3	David de Lima / Camila Belassi (Uruguay)	3	1	0	2	3	4	−1	3		0–2	1–2	—	2–0
4	Olga Bareiro / Mariana Salsamendi (Paraguay)	3	0	0	3	0	6	−6	0		0–2	0–2	0–2	—

Knockout stage

Semifinals
(Chile) Kimberley Ahumada (Chile) Catalina Arancibia	2
(Ecuador) Alejandra Álvarez (Ecuador) Marines Holguín	0
(Argentina) Victoria Vilche (Argentina) María Mosca	2
(Peru) María Torres (Peru) Nicole Aragones	0

Final
(Chile) Kimberley Ahumada (Chile) Catalina Arancibia	0
(Argentina) Victoria Vilche (Argentina) María Mosca	2
Bronze medal match
(Ecuador) Alejandra Álvarez (Ecuador) Marines Holguín	2
(Peru) María Torres (Peru) Nicole Aragones	0
