= Kelly Williford =

American born-Dominican female tennis player

- Country (sports): Dominican Republic
- Born: October 21, 1994 (age 31) New Jersey, United States
- Plays: Left (two-handed backhand)
- Prize money: US$ 21,709

Singles
- Career record: 34–65
- Career titles: 1 ITF
- Highest ranking: No. 1070 (16 December 2019)

Doubles
- Career record: 42–49
- Career titles: 0
- Highest ranking: No. 598 (13 June 2022)

Team competitions
- Fed Cup: 5–7

Kelly Williford (born October 21, 1994) is an American born-Dominican former tennis player.

On 16 December 2019, she achieved her career-high singles ranking of world No. 1070. On 6 August 2018, she peaked at No. 619 in the doubles rankings.

Williford has represented the Dominican Republic in the Fed Cup, where she has a win–loss record of 5–7.

She is a native of the Basking Ridge section of Bernards Township, New Jersey, where she attended Ridge High School before moving on to play for the Virginia Tech Hokies women's tennis team.

== ITF Circuit finals ==
=== Doubles: 8 (1 title, 7 runner-ups) ===
Legend $25,000 tournaments $15,000 tournaments	Finals by surface Hard (1–5) Clay (0–2)

Result	W-L	Date	Tournament	Tier	Surface	Partner	Opponents	Score
Loss	0–1	Aug 2017	ITF Mrągowo, Poland	15,000	Clay	(United States) Akiko Okuda	(Italy) Angelica Moratelli (France) Marine Partaud	2–6, 3–6
Loss	0–2	Sep 2017	ITF Cairo, Egypt	15,000	Clay	(United States) Akiko Okuda	(Russia) Victoria Kan (Russia) Maria Zotova	3–6, 3–6
Loss	0–3	Oct 2019	ITF Norman, US	15,000	Hard	(United States) Amy Zhu	(Chile) Fernanda Labraña (Italy) Anna Turati	1–6, 5–7
Loss	0–4	Oct 2019	ITF Metepec, Mexico	15,000	Hard	(Guatemala) Kirsten-Andrea Weedon	(United States) Sarah Lee (United States) Amber Washington	1–6, 6–4, [6–10]
Loss	0–5	Jun 2021	ITF Santo Domingo, Dominican Republic	25,000	Hard	(Dominican Republic) Ana Carmen Zamburek	(United States) Emina Bektas (United States) Quinn Gleason	5–7, 4–6
Loss	0–6	Oct 2021	ITF Norman, US	15,000	Hard	(United States) McKenna Schaefbauer	(Finland) Oona Orpana (Italy) Martina Zerulo	2–6, 7–5, [6–10]
Loss	0–7	May 2022	ITF Cancún, Mexico	15,000	Hard	(United States) Kariann Pierre-Louis	(Japan) Saki Imamura (Japan) Miho Kuramochi	6–3, 3–6, [8–10]
Win	1–7	Sep 2022	ITF Cancún, Mexico	15,000	Hard	(United States) Anna Ulyashchenko	(Venezuela) Nadia Echeverría Alam (Mexico) Jessica Hinojosa Gomez	7–6^{(5)}, 4–6, [10–6]
