= Melissa Morales =

Guatemalan tennis player

- Country (sports): Guatemala
- Born: 4 December 1990 (age 35) Escuintla, Guatemala
- Prize money: $25,847

Singles
- Career record: 77–102
- Career titles: 0
- Highest ranking: No. 784 (12 November 2018)

Doubles
- Career record: 82–86
- Career titles: 3 ITF
- Highest ranking: No. 608 (24 September 2018)

Team competitions
- Fed Cup: 25–17
Medal record
Representing Guatemala
Women's Tennis
Central American and Caribbean Games
Bronze medal – third place	2014 Veracruz	Doubles
Bronze medal – third place	2014 Veracruz	Team Event

Melissa Morales (born 4 December 1990) is an inactive Guatemalan tennis player.

On 12 November 2018, Morales reached her best singles ranking of world No. 784. On 24 September 2018, she peaked at No. 608 in the doubles rankings.

Since her debut for the Guatemala Fed Cup team in 2008, Morales has a win–loss record of 25–17 as of August 2024.

== ITF finals ==
=== Singles: 1 (runner–up) ===
Legend $25,000 tournaments $10,000 tournaments	Finals by surface Hard (0–1) Clay (0–0)

Result	W–L	Date	Tournament	Tier	Surface	Opponent	Score
Loss	0–1	Dec 2006	ITF Havana, Cuba	10,000	Hard	(Switzerland) Stefania Boffa	1–6, 6–3, 3–6

=== Doubles: 8 (3 titles, 5 runner–ups) ===
Legend $25,000 tournaments $15,000 tournaments $10,000 tournaments	Finals by surface Hard (2–3) Clay (1–1) Carpet (0–1)

Result	No.	Date	Tier	Tournament	Surface	Partner	Opponents	Score
Loss	1.	27 November 2006	10,000	ITF Havana, Cuba	Hard	(Cuba) Lumay Díaz Hernández	(Cuba) Yamile Fors Guerra (Cuba) Yanet Núñez Mojarena	3–6, 1–6
Loss	1.	2 October 2017	15,000	ITF Sharm El Sheikh, Egypt	Hard	(Guatemala) Kirsten-Andrea Weedon	(Australia) Jelena Stojanovic (Australia) Alexandra Walters	3–6, 1–6
Loss	2.	30 June 2018	15,000	ITF Hammamet, Tunisia	Clay	(Chile) Fernanda Brito	(Spain) Irene Burillo Escorihuela (Spain) Andrea Lázaro García	4–6, 4–6
Win	3.	7 September 2018	15,000+H	ITF Luque, Paraguay	Hard	(Guatemala) Kirsten-Andrea Weedon	(Paraguay) Camila Giangreco Campiz (Paraguay) Sarah Tami-Masi	7–5, 6–4
Loss	4.	10 December 2018	15,000	ITF Solarino, Italy	Carpet	(Guatemala) Kirsten-Andrea Weedon	(Slovenia) Veronika Erjavec (Slovenia) Kristina Novak	3–6, 6–7^{(4)}
Win	2.	6 October 2019	15,000	ITF Santiago, Chile	Clay	(Peru) Romina Ccuno	(Ecuador) Mell Reasco (Colombia) Antonia Samudio	6–3, 6–3
Win	3.	9 November 2019	15,000	ITF Guatemala City	Hard	(Guatemala) Kirsten-Andrea Weedon	(South Africa) Warona Mdlulwa (Argentina) Catalina Pella	6–3, 7–6^{(4)}
Loss	5.	14 May 2022	15,000	ITF Cancún, Mexico	Hard	(Guatemala) Kirsten-Andrea Weedon	(Japan) Saki Imamura (Chinese Taipei) Tsao Chia-yi	3–6, 1–6

== Fed Cup participation ==
=== Singles ===
Edition	Date	Location	Against	Surface	Opponent	W/L	Score
2008 Fed Cup; Americas Zone Group II	24 April 2008	Cochabamba, Bolivia	(Barbados) Barbados	Clay	(Barbados) Alyssa Fuentes	W	6–2, 7–5
2008 Fed Cup; Americas Zone Group II	25 April 2008	Cochabamba, Bolivia	Venezuela	Clay	(Venezuela) Mariana Muci	W	7–5, 6–0
2015 Fed Cup; Americas Zone Group II	26 June 2015	Santo Domingo Este, Dominican Republic	(Puerto Rico) Puerto Rico	Hard	(Puerto Rico) Mónica Matías	L	2–6, 6–3, 6–7^{(3)}
2016 Fed Cup; Americas Zone Group II	1 February 2016	Bayamón, Puerto Rico	(The Bahamas) Bahamas	Hard	(The Bahamas) Iesha Shepherd	W	6–3, 6–1
2016 Fed Cup; Americas Zone Group II	2 February 2016	Bayamón, Puerto Rico	Puerto Rico	Hard	(Puerto Rico) Monica Puig	L	0–6, 1–6
2016 Fed Cup; Americas Zone Group II	3 February 2016	Bayamón, Puerto Rico	Dominican Republic	Hard	(Dominican Republic) Laura Lissette Quezada Martínez	W	6–1, 6–0
2016 Fed Cup; Americas Zone Group II	4 February 2016	Bayamón, Puerto Rico	Uruguay	Hard	(Uruguay) Margot Mercier	W	6–2, 6–2
2016 Fed Cup; Americas Zone Group II	6 February 2016	Bayamón, Puerto Rico	Venezuela	Hard	(Venezuela) Andrea Gámiz	L	1–6, 3–6

=== Doubles ===
Edition	Date	Location	Against	Surface	Partner	Opponents	W/L	Score
2008 Fed Cup; Americas Zone Group II	25 April 2008	Cochabamba, Bolivia	(Venezuela) Venezuela	Clay	(Guatemala) Jessica Lehnhoff	(Venezuela) Mariana Muci (Venezuela) Milagros Sequera	L	3–6, 3–6
2015 Fed Cup; Americas Zone Group II	24 June 2015	Santo Domingo Este, Dominican Republic	(Bermuda) Bermuda	Hard	(Guatemala) Camila Ramazzini	(Bermuda) Jacklyn Lambert (Bermuda) Zaire Simmons	W	6–0, 6–0
2016 Fed Cup; Americas Zone Group II	1 February 2016	Bayamón, Puerto Rico	(The Bahamas) Bahamas	Hard	(Guatemala) Kirsten-Andrea Weedon	(The Bahamas) Lauryn Daxon (The Bahamas) Sierra Donaldson	W	6–0, 6–0
2016 Fed Cup; Americas Zone Group II	2 February 2016	Bayamón, Puerto Rico	Puerto Rico	Hard	(Guatemala) Kirsten-Andrea Weedon	(Puerto Rico) Ana Sofía Cordero (Puerto Rico) Monica Puig	L	4–6, 3–6
2016 Fed Cup; Americas Zone Group II	3 February 2016	Bayamón, Puerto Rico	Dominican Republic	Hard	(Guatemala) Rut Galindo	(Dominican Republic) Penélope Abreu (Dominican Republic) Laura Lissette Quezada Martínez	W	6–0, 6–0
2016 Fed Cup; Americas Zone Group II	4 February 2016	Bayamón, Puerto Rico	Uruguay	Hard	(Guatemala) Kirsten-Andrea Weedon	(Uruguay) Margot Mercier (Uruguay) Florencia Rossi	W	6–1, 6–4
