= Alejandra Álvarez =

Ecuadorian tennis player (born 1994)

- Full name: Alejandra Álvarez
- Country (sports): Ecuador
- Born: 24 July 1994 (age 32) Ecuador
- Prize money: $1,006

Singles
- Career record: 3–4
- Career titles: 0

Doubles
- Career record: 5–4
- Career titles: 0

Team competitions
- Fed Cup: 6–3

Alejandra Álvarez (born 24 July 1994) is an Ecuadorian tennis and padel player.

Playing for Ecuador at the Fed Cup, Álvarez has a win–loss record of 6–3.

Recently, Álvarez competing in padel and won a bronze medal at the 2026 South American Games.

== ITF finals (0–1) ==
=== Doubles (0–1) ===
Legend $100,000 tournaments $75,000 tournaments $50,000 tournaments $25,000 tournaments $15,000 tournaments $10,000 tournaments	Finals by surface Hard (0–0) Clay (0–1) Grass (0–0) Carpet (0–0)

Result	No.	Date	Category	Tournament	Surface	Partner	Opponents	Score
Runner-up	1.	14 December 2009	$10,000	Quito, Ecuador	Clay	(Ecuador) Marie Elise Casares	(Ecuador) Mariana Correa (Chile) Andrea Koch Benvenuto	6–7^{(3–7)}, 2–6
