= Ximena Hermoso =

Mexican tennis player (born 1991)

- Country (sports): Mexico
- Born: April 28, 1991 (age 34); Puebla, Mexico
- Plays: Right (two-handed backhand)
- Prize money: $80,279

Singles
- Career record: 199–180
- Career titles: 3 ITF
- Highest ranking: No. 331 (23 April 2012)

Doubles
- Career record: 104–112
- Career titles: 5 ITF
- Highest ranking: No. 329 (20 May 2013)

Team competitions
- Fed Cup: 15–7

Ximena Hermoso (born April 28, 1991) is a retired tennis player from Mexico.

On 23 April 2012, she reached her highest singles ranking of 331. Her best WTA doubles ranking was world No. 329, achieved 20 May 2013.

Playing for the Mexico Fed Cup team, Hermoso has a win–loss record of 15–7.

== ITF Circuit finals ==
Legend
$100,000 tournaments
$75,000 tournaments
$50,000 tournaments
$25,000 tournaments
$10,000 tournaments

=== Singles (3–4) ===
Result	No.	Date	Tournament	Surface	Opponent	Score
Loss	1.	10 May 2011	ITF Tenerife, Spain	Hard	(France) Victoria Larrière	1–6, 1–6
Win	2.	11 July 2011	ITF Tanger, Morocco	Clay	(Morocco) Fatima El Allami	6–1, 7–6^{(5)}
Loss	3.	21 July 2011	Casablanca, Morocco	Clay	(Spain) Yvonne Cavallé Reimers	5–7, 6–4, 3–6
Win	4.	18 September 2011	Porto Rafti, Greece	Hard	(Israel) Ofri Lankri	4–6, 6–4, 6–2
Win	5.	8 June 2013	Amarante, Portugal	Hard	(Spain) Nuria Párrizas Díaz	6–3, 6–2
Loss	6.	16 June 2013	Guimaraes, Portugal	Hard	(France) Clothilde de Bernardi	0–6, 2–6
Loss	7.	9 June 2014	Coatzacoalcos, Mexico	Hard	(Mexico) Marcela Zacarías	3–6, 6–7^{(3)}

=== Doubles (5–9) ===
Result	No.	Date	Tournament	Surface	Partner	Opponents	Score
Win	1.	31 May 2009	ITF Braga, Portugal	Clay	(Mexico) Daniela Múñoz Gallegos	(Slovakia) Martina Babáková (Belgium) Davinia Lobbinger	6–3, 6–4
Loss	2.	20 September 2009	ITF Lleida, Spain	Clay	(Spain) Garbiñe Muguruza	(Georgia (country)) Sofia Kvatsabaia (Russia) Avgusta Tsybysheva	3–6, 2–6
Win	3.	11 October 2009	ITF Les Franqueses del Vallès, Spain	Clay	(Spain) Garbiñe Muguruza	(Israel) Efrat Mishor (Germany) Anna Zaja	6–2, 6–2
Loss	4.	1 November 2010	ITF La Marsa, Tunisia	Clay	(Mexico) Ivette López	(United Kingdom) Amanda Carreras (Spain) Sheila Solsona Carcasona	4–6, 5–7
Win	5.	7 May 2011	ITF Gran Canaria, Spain	Clay	(Mexico) Ivette López	(Italy) Nicole Clerico (Italy) Martina Caciotti	6–2, 6–3
Win	6.	14 May 2011	ITF Tenerife, Spain	Clay	(Mexico) Ivette López	(Japan) Yuka Mori (Japan) Kaori Onishi	6–4, 7–5
Loss	7.	13 June 2011	ITF Montemor-o-Novo, Portugal	Hard	(Mexico) Ivette López	(Venezuela) Andrea Gámiz (United Kingdom) Amanda Carreras	3–6, 4–6
Loss	8.	23 July 2011	ITF Casablanca, Morocco	Clay	(Mexico) Ivette López	(Tunisia) Nour Abbès (Poland) Agata Barańska	4–6, 2–6
Loss	9.	29 October 2011	ITF Montego Bay, Jamaica	Hard	(Mexico) Ivette López	(United States) Jennifer Brady (Czech Republic) Nikola Hübnerová	3–6, 1–6
Loss	10.	23 April 2012	ITF Vic, Spain	Clay	(United Kingdom) Amanda Carreras	(Russia) Eugeniya Pashkova (Bulgaria) Isabella Shinikova	1–6, 2–6
Win	11.	14 October 2012	ITF Mexico City, Mexico	Hard	(Mexico) Marcela Zacarías	(Russia) Nika Kukharchuk (United States) Jessica Lawrence	6–3, 7–5
Loss	12.	29 April 2013	ITF Heraklion, Greece	Carpet	(Spain) Olga Parres Azcoitia	(Netherlands) Valeria Podda (Serbia) Tamara Čurović	3–6, 2–6
Loss	13.	18 May 2014	ITF Antalya, Turkey	Hard	(Serbia) Barbara Bonic	(United States) Alexa Guarachi (United States) Kate Turvy	3–6, 6–7^{(6)}
Loss	14.	25 May 2014	ITF Antalya, Turkey	Hard	(Romania) Daiana Negreanu	(Bosnia and Herzegovina) Anita Husarić (Italy) Francesca Palmigiano	w/o
