= Alejandra Granillo =

Mexican tennis player (born 1991)

- Country (sports): Mexico
- Born: 1 June 1991 (age 34) Pachuca, Hidalgo, Mexico
- Plays: Right-handed
- Prize money: $13,997

Singles
- Highest ranking: No. 557 (26 July 2010)

Doubles
- Highest ranking: No. 884 (18 May 2009)

Alejandra Granillo (born 1 June 1991) is a Mexican tennis player.

== Biography ==
Granillo was born on 1 June 1991, in Pachuca. A right-handed player, she was taught the sport by her father.

In both 2009 and 2010, Granillo competed for the Mexico Fed Cup team, appearing in a total of seven ties. As a professional player she featured mostly on the ITF circuit, but made a WTA Tour main draw appearance as a wildcard at Acapulco in 2010, where she was beaten in the first round by Kaia Kanepi. She won a singles bronze medal at the 2010 Central American and Caribbean Games.

From 2011 to 2014, she played college tennis with Pepperdine University in the United States. She represented Mexico at the 2011 Summer Universiade. As a freshman she earned All-WCC first team selection for doubles.

== ITF finals ==
=== Singles (0–1) ===
Outcome	Date	Tournament	Surface	Opponent	Score
Runner-up	6 September 2009	Celaya, Mexico	Clay	(Argentina) Mailen Auroux	3–6, 1–6
