= Kerrie Cartwright =

Bahamian tennis player

- Country (sports): Bahamas
- Residence: Nassau, Bahamas
- Born: 11 April 1992 (age 33) Nassau, Bahamas
- Plays: Right-handed (two-handed backhand)
- Prize money: US$7,576

Singles
- Career record: 36–31
- Career titles: 0
- Highest ranking: No. 916 (11 June 2018)

Doubles
- Career record: 24–22
- Career titles: 1 ITF
- Highest ranking: No. 587 (11 June 2018)
- Current ranking: No. 895 (29 July 2018)

Team competitions
- Fed Cup: 27–14
- Last updated on: 29 July 2019.

Kerrie Cartwright (born 11 April 1992) is a Bahamian female professional tennis player.

Cartwright has a career high WTA singles ranking of 916, achieved on 11 June 2018. She also has a career high WTA doubles ranking of 587, achieved on 11 June 2018. Cartwright has won one doubles ITF doubles title.

Cartwright has represented Bahamas at the Fed Cup, where she has a win–loss record of 27–14.

== ITF Finals ==
=== Doubles: 4 (1 titles, 3 runner–ups) ===
Legend
$100,000 tournaments
$75,000 tournaments
$50,000 tournaments
$25,000 tournaments
$10,000 tournaments

Result	W–L	Date	Tournament	Tier	Surface	Partner	Opponents	Score
Loss	0–1	Jul 2017	ITF Les Contamines, France	15,000	Hard	(United States) Kariann Pierre-Louis	(Germany) Tayisiya Morderger (Germany) Yana Morderger	6–2, 4–6, [7–10]
Loss	0–2	Nov 2017	ITF Pereira, Colombia	15,000	Clay	(United States) Kariann Pierre-Louis	(United Kingdom) Emily Appleton (Colombia) María Fernanda Herazo	5–7, 6–2, [7–10]
Win	1–2	Mar 2018	ITF Heraklion, Greece	15,000	Clay	(United States) Kariann Pierre-Louis	(Belgium) Michaela Boev (Romania) Raluca Georgiana Șerban	6–4, 7–5
Loss	1–3	May 2018	ITF Tacarigua, Trinidad and Tobago	15,000	Hard	(United States) Kariann Pierre-Louis	(United Kingdom) Emily Appleton (Mexico) María José Portillo Ramírez	4–6, 3–6

== ITF Junior Finals ==
Legend
Grand Slam
Category GA
Category G1
Category G2
Category G3
Category G4
Category G5

=== Singles: 4 (1 title, 3 runner–ups) ===
Result	W–L	Date	Tournament	Tier	Surface	Opponent	Score
Loss	0–1	Aug 2007	Tampico, Mexico	G4	Hard	(Mexico) Alejandra Granillo	6–7^{(4)}, 5–7
Loss	0–2	Oct 2007	Port of Spain, Trinidad and Tobago	G4	Hard	(Trinidad and Tobago) Olivia Bennett	3–6, 1–6
Loss	0–3	Feb 2008	Jalisco, Mexico	G4	Hard	(United States) Shinann Featherston	1–6, 4–6
Win	1–3	Aug 2009	Santo Domingo, Dominican Republic	G4	Hard	(Netherlands Antilles) Fausthyara Pietersz	6–0, 6–3

=== Doubles: 8 (5 titles, 3 runner–ups) ===
Legend
Grand Slam
Category GA
Category G1
Category G2
Category G3
Category G4
Category G5

Result	W–L	Date	Tournament	Tier	Surface	Partner	Opponents	Score
Win	1–0	Aug 2007	Tampico, Mexico	G4	Hard	(Mexico) Victoria Lozano	(Mexico) Maria Bayon (Mexico) Alejandra Granillo	6–1, 6–3
Loss	1–1	Aug 2007	Tampico, Mexico	G5	Hard	(Mexico) Maria José García Villa	(Mexico) Maria Bayon (Mexico) Alejandra Granillo	2–6, 2–6
Win	2–1	Oct 2007	Port of Spain, Trinidad and Tobago	G4	Hard	(Trinidad and Tobago) Olivia Bennett	(United States) Annie Mulholland (United States) Carleena Sardinha	5–7, 6–4, 6–2
Loss	2–2	Mar 2008	La Libertad, El Salvador	G4	Hard	(Mexico) Victoria Lozano	(United States) Gabriela Mastromarino (United States) Lauren McHale	5–7, 4–6
Win	3–2	Jun 2008	Nassau, Bahamas	G5	Hard	(The Bahamas) Kalotina Klonaris	(Colombia) Melissa Bolívar (Netherlands Antilles) Fausthyara Pietersz	6–3, 6–3
Loss	3–3	Aug 2008	Tampico, Mexico	G4	Hard	(Mexico) Karen Hernandez	(Mexico) Alejandra Granillo (Puerto Rico) Monica Puig	0–6, 3–6
Win	4–3	Jul 2009	Kingston, Jamaica	G4	Hard	(United States) Nadia Echeverría Alam	(United States) Kong Hai-li (United States) Kelsey Laurente	3–6, 6–3 [10–7]
Win	5–3	Jul 2009	Santo Domingo, Dominican Republic	G4	Hard	(Mexico) Karen Hernandez	(Netherlands Antilles) Fausthyara Pietersz (Mexico) Andrea Tabachnik	7–6^{(3)} 4–3 ret.
