= Paulina Schippers =

Guatemalan tennis player

- Country (sports): Guatemala
- Born: 2 April 1991 (age 34); Guatemala City
- Height: 5 ft 5 in (1.65 m)
- Prize money: $221

Singles
- Career record: 1–1

Doubles
- Career record: 0–1

Team competitions
- Fed Cup: 11–3

Paulina Schippers (born 2 April 1991 in Guatemala City) is a Guatemalan former tennis player.

Having played for the Guatemala Fed Cup team between 2007 and 2012, Schippers has a win–loss record of 11–3 in international competition.

Paulina has a younger sister, Daniela, who is also a tennis player.
