= Simone Pratt =

Bahamian tennis player

- Full name: Simone Robin Pratt
- Country (sports): Bahamas
- Born: 6 January 1996 (age 30) Freeport, The Bahamas
- Plays: Right Handed (Double Handed Backhand)

Singles
- Career titles: 0 WTA, 0 ITF
- Highest ranking: No. 953 (29 October 2012)

Grand Slam singles results
- Australian Open: —
- French Open: —
- Wimbledon: —
- US Open: —

Doubles
- Career titles: 0 WTA, 0 ITF
- Highest ranking: No. 1167 (15 April 2013)
- Last updated on: 6 September 2013.

Simone Pratt is a professional Bahamian tennis player. Pratt has been ranked as high as world number 953 in singles by the Women's Tennis Association (WTA). She has also participated in Fed Cup competition, representing The Bahamas, and has an 11–11 win/loss record as of 2013.

On the Junior Circuit, Pratt's world highest world ranking, as of September 2013, was 173rd, which she achieved in 2012. However, she then suffered a drastic drop in the rankings, falling to 649th in March 2013. After that, she made a comeback and the summer of 2013 has seen her win three consecutive singles tournaments which have lifted her ranking to 196th.

Pratt is currently a sophomore at ASA College in Miami. She is of African descent.

== ITF Junior Finals ==
Grand Slam
Category GA
Category G1
Category G2
Category G3
Category G4
Category G5

=== Singles Finals (5–5) ===
Outcome	No.	Date	Tournament	Surface	Opponent	Score
Runner-up	1.	9 April 2011	Port of Spain, Trinidad and Tobago	Hard	(Russia) Renata Arshavskaya	5–7, 2–6
Winner	2.	25 June 2011	Havana, Cuba	Hard	(Canada) Devin Chypyha	6–1, 6–1
Runner-up	3.	2 July 2011	Nassau, Bahamas	Hard	(Russia) Kristina Chasovskikh	2–6, 0–6
Runner-up	4.	13 August 2011	Castries, Saint Lucia	Hard	(Switzerland) Sara Ottomano	3–6, 6–1, 0–6
Winner	5.	20 August 2011	Kingstown, Saint Vincent and the Grenadines	Hard	(United States) Madison Bourguignon	6–4, 6–1
Runner-up	6.	27 August 2011	Scarborough, Trinidad and Tobago	Hard	(United States) Madison Bourguignon	6–4, 3–6, 2–6
Runner-up	7.	20 April 2013	Santo Domingo, Dominican Republic	Hard	(Mexico) Cassandra Vázquez	2–6, 4–6
Winner	8.	13 July 2013	Nassau, Bahamas	Hard	(United States) Sofia Kenin	4–1 ret.
Winner	9.	18 August 2013	Castries, Saint Lucia	Hard	(Trinidad and Tobago) Breana Stampfli	6–1, 6–1
Winner	10.	24 August 2013	Kingstown, Saint Vincent and the Grenadines	Hard	(Trinidad and Tobago) Breana Stampfli	6–2, 6–1

=== Doubles finals (3–4) ===
Outcome	No.	Date	Tournament	Surface	Partner	Opponents in the final	Score in the final
Runner-up	1.	12 September 2009	San Pedro Sula, Honduras	Hard	(Honduras) Leyla Taracena	(Mexico) Covadonga Muradas (Mexico) Victoria Rodríguez	3–6, 2–6
Winner	2.	10 October 2009	Willemstad, Curaçao	Hard	(Mexico) Victoria Rodríguez	(Venezuela) Carmen Blanco (Venezuela) Barbara Rodriguez	6–3, 7–6^{(2)}
Winner	3.	25 June 2011	Havana, Cuba	Hard	(El Salvador) Rosalinda Calderón Recinos	(Canada) Devin Chypyha (Canada) Lauren Chypyha	6–4, 6–2
Winner	4.	23 July 2011	Kingston, Jamaica	Hard	(Mexico) Valeria Salazar	(United States) Johnnise Renaud (United States) Blair Shankle	6–4, 6–3
Runner-up	5.	13 August 2011	Castries, Saint Lucia	Hard	(Germany) Jasmin Jebawy	(United States) Madison Bourguignon (Switzerland) Sara Ottomano	5–7, 1–6
Runner-up	6.	6 May 2012	Puebla, Mexico	Hard	(Guatemala) Daniela Schippers	(Mexico) Alejandra Cisneros (Mexico) Victoria Rodríguez	3–6, 6–2 [5–10]
Runner-up	7.	31 August 2013	Scarborough, Trinidad and Tobago	Hard	(The Bahamas) Danielle Andrea Thompson	(United Kingdom) Mia Smith (Trinidad and Tobago) Breana Stampfli	1–6, 3–6
