= Panama Billie Jean King Cup team =

Panama
- Captain: Alfredo Fawcett
- Nations Ranking: 97 (14 November 2016)
- Colors: red & white
- First year: 1997
- Years played: 12
- Ties played (W–L): 53 (12–41)
- Best finish: Zonal Group II RR
- Most total wins: Anabelle Espinosa Rodríguez (17–19)
- Most singles wins: Anabelle Espinosa Rodríguez (11–9)
- Most doubles wins: Anabelle Espinosa Rodríguez (6–10)
- Best doubles team: Anabelle Espinosa Rodríguez / Lorena Porras (5–6)
- Most ties played: Anabelle Espinosa Rodríguez (20)
- Most years played: Anabelle Espinosa Rodríguez (4)

The Panama Fed Cup team represents Panama in Fed Cup tennis competition and are governed by the Federación Panamena de Tenis. They have not competed since 2014.

== History ==
Panama competed in its first Fed Cup in 1997. Their best result was sixth in Group II in 2006.

== See also ==
- Billie Jean King Cup
- Panama Davis Cup team
