= Kirsten-Andrea Weedon =

Guatemalan tennis player

Andrea Weedon
- Full name: Kirsten-Andrea Weedon
- Country (sports): Guatemala
- Born: 18 February 1989 (age 37)
- Plays: Right-handed (two-handed backhand)
- Prize money: $35,354

Singles
- Career record: 114–110
- Career titles: 0
- Highest ranking: No. 608 (5 August 2019)

Doubles
- Career record: 95–98
- Career titles: 2 ITF
- Highest ranking: No. 634 (24 September 2018)

Team competitions
- Fed Cup: 39–41
- Last updated on: 24 May 2026.

Kirsten-Andrea Weedon (born 18 February 1989) is a Guatemalan inactive tennis player.

She has a career-high WTA singles ranking of 608, achieved on 5 August 2019. She also has a career-high doubles ranking of world No. 634, reached on 24 September 2018.

Playing for Guatemala Fed Cup team, Weedon has a win–loss record of 39–41 as of April 2025.

== ITF Circuit finals ==
=== Singles (0–2) ===
Legend $10,000 tournaments	Finals by surface Hard (0–2)

Result	No.	Date	Tournament	Tier	Surface	Opponent	Score
Loss	0–1	Dec 2017	ITF Manta, Ecuador	10,000	Hard	(Colombia) María Herazo González	3–6, 0–6
Loss	0–2	Nov 2018	ITF Antalya, Turkey	10,000	Hard	(Turkey) Ayla Aksu	5–7, 1–6

=== Doubles (2–6) ===
Legend $25,000 tournaments $15,000 tournaments	Finals by surface Hard (2–5) Carpet (0–1)

Outcome	No.	Date	Tournament	Surface	Partner	Opponents	Score
Runner-up	1.	7 October 2017	ITF Sharm El Sheikh, Egypt	Hard	(Guatemala) Melissa Morales	(Australia) Jelena Stojanovic (Australia) Alexandra Walters	3–6, 1–6
Winner	1.	7 September 2018	ITF Luque, Paraguay	Hard	(Guatemala) Melissa Morales	(Paraguay) Camila Giangreco Campiz (Paraguay) Sarah Tami-Masi	7–5, 6–4
Runner-up	2.	14 December 2018	ITF Solarino, Italy	Carpet	(Guatemala) Melissa Morales	(Slovakia) Veronika Erjavec (Slovakia) Kristina Novak	3–6, 6–7^{(4)}
Runner-up	3.	11 May 2019	ITF Cancún, Mexico	Hard	(Brazil) Eduarda Piai	(Mexico) Marcela Zacarías (Mexico) María Portillo Ramírez	2–6, 2–6
Runner-up	4.	25 May 2019	ITF Cancún, Mexico	Hard	(United States) Amy Zhu	(Brazil) Thaisa Grana Pedretti (Brazil) Eduarda Piai	5–7, 5–7
Runner-up	5.	20 October 2019	ITF Metepec, Mexico	Hard	(Dominican Republic) Kelly Williford	(United States) Sarah Lee (United States) Amber Washington	1–6, 6–4, [6–10]
Winner	2.	9 November 2019	ITF Guatemala City	Hard	(Guatemala) Melissa Morales	(South Africa) Warona Mdlulwa (Argentina) Catalina Pella	6–3, 7–6^{(4)}
Runner-up	6.	14 May 2022	ITF Cancún, Mexico	Hard	(Guatemala) Melissa Morales	(Japan) Saki Imamura (Chinese Taipei) Chia Yi-tsao	3–6, 1–6
