= Puerto Rico Billie Jean King Cup team =

National tennis team

Puerto Rico
- Captain: Juan Carlos Escudero
- Nations Ranking: 52 ▼3 (April 24, 2017)
- Colors: blue & red
- First year: 1992
- Years played: 25
- Ties played (W–L): 99 (51–48)
- Best finish: World Group II Play-offs (2005)
- Most total wins: Vilmarie Castellvi (28–26)
- Most singles wins: Vilmarie Castellvi (19–15)
- Most doubles wins: Mari Toro (11–6)
- Best doubles team: Joanna Bauzá / Mari Toro (5–1)
- Most ties played: Vilmarie Castellvi (34)
- Most years played: Vilmarie Castellvi (9)

The Puerto Rico Billie Jean King Cup team represents Puerto Rico in the Billie Jean King Cup tennis competition and are governed by the Associación de Tenis de Puerto Rico. They currently compete in the Americas Zone of Group II.

== History ==
Puerto Rico competed in its first Fed Cup in 1992. Their best result was reaching the World Group II Play-offs in 2005.

== See also ==
- Billie Jean King Cup
- Puerto Rico Davis Cup team
