= Trinidad and Tobago Billie Jean King Cup team =

Trinidad and Tobago
- Captain: Trinidad and Tobago
- Nations Ranking: 67 (14 November 2016)
- Colors: red & black
- First year: 1990
- Years played: 23
- Ties played (W–L): 95 (37–58)
- Best finish: Zonal Group II RR
- Most total wins: Anneliese Rose (51–27)
- Most singles wins: Anneliese Rose (29–15)
- Most doubles wins: Anneliese Rose (22–12)
- Best doubles team: Anneliese Rose / Breana Stampfli (7–1)
- Most ties played: Anneliese Rose (46)
- Most years played: Anneliese Rose (10)

The Trinidad and Tobago Fed Cup team represents Trinidad and Tobago in Fed Cup tennis competition and are governed by Tennis TT. They have not competed since 2015.

== History ==
Trinidad and Tobago competed in its first Fed Cup in 1990. Their best result was reaching the final regional qualifying round in 1993.

== See also ==
- Billie Jean King Cup
- Trinidad and Tobago Davis Cup team
