= Dominican Republic Billie Jean King Cup team =

Dominican women's tennis team

Dominican Republic
- Captain: Joelle Schad
- ITF ranking: 52 (16 November 2015)
- Colors: red & white
- First year: 1991
- Years played: 27
- Ties played (W–L): 108 (44–64)
- Years in World Group: 1 (0 - 1)
- Best finish: Word Group (1990)
- Most total wins: Joelle Schad (38–21)
- Most singles wins: Joelle Schad (21–10)
- Most doubles wins: Glenny Cepeda (21–6)
- Best doubles team: Glenny Cepeda / Joelle Schad (7–1) Glenny Cepeda / Carla Prieto (7–2)
- Most ties played: Joelle Schad (41)
- Most years played: Joelle Schad (10)

The Dominican Republic Billie Jean King Cup team represents the Dominican Republic in Billie Jean King Cup tennis competition and are governed by the Federación Dominicana de Tenis. They currently compete in the Americas Zone Group II.

== History ==
Dominican Republic competed in its first Fed Cup in 1990. Their best result was qualifying for the 32-team main draw in 1990.

== See also ==
- Billie Jean King Cup
- Dominican Republic Davis Cup team
