= Guatemala Billie Jean King Cup team =

Guatemalan women's tennis team

The Guatemala Billie Jean King Cup team represents Guatemala in Billie Jean King Cup tennis competition and are governed by the Federación Nactional de Tenis de Guatemala.

They currently compete in the Americas Zone Group II.

== History ==
Guatemala competed in its first Fed Cup in 1992. Their best result was finishing fifth in Group II in 2007.

== See also ==
- Billie Jean King Cup
- Guatemala Davis Cup team
