= 2000 Fed Cup Americas Zone Group II – play-offs =

International tennis competition play-offs

The play-offs of the 2000 Fed Cup Americas Zone Group II were the final stages of the Group II Zonal Competition involving teams from the Americas. Using the positions determined in their pools, the fourteen teams faced off to determine their overall placing in the 2000 Fed Cup Americas Group II. The top two teams (i.e. the teams that won matches in the first round of the top quarter) advanced to Group I next year.

Placing	Pool A	Pool B	Pool C	Pool D
1	Dominican Republic	Ecuador	Puerto Rico	Bolivia
2	Trinidad and Tobago	Bahamas	Guatemala	El Salvador
3	Barbados	Panama	Bermuda	Costa Rica
4		Antigua and Barbuda	Jamaica	

== Draw ==
Play-offs
Puerto Rico	0
Bolivia	3

First round
Dominican Republic	2
Puerto Rico	1
Bolivia	0
Ecuador	3

Second round
Dominican Republic	0
Ecuador	3

Play-offs
Trinidad and Tobago	3
Guatemala	0

First round
Trinidad and Tobago	1
El Salvador	2
Guatemala	0
Bahamas	3

Second round
El Salvador	0
Bahamas	3

Play-offs
Barbados	1
Panama	2

First round
Barbados	0
Costa Rica	3
Bermuda	2
Panama	1

Second round
Costa Rica	3
Bermuda	0

First round 12 May
Antigua and Barbuda	1
Jamaica	2

=== First round ===
==== Dominican Republic vs. Puerto Rico ====
Dominican Republic
2
Maya C.C., La Libertad, El Salvador
12 May 2000
Red clay (outdoors)

Puerto Rico
1

			1	2	3
1	(Dominican Republic) (Puerto Rico)	Glenny Cepeda; Jessica Roland-Rosario	7^{8} 6^{6}	6; 1
2	(Dominican Republic) (Puerto Rico)	Joelle Schad; Mari Toró	7^{7} 6^{2}	6; 2
3	(Dominican Republic) (Puerto Rico)	Daysi Espinal / Carla Prieto; Tari Ann Toró / Edna Vásquez	0; 6	1; 6

==== Bolivia vs. Ecuador ====
Bolivia
0
Maya C.C., La Libertad, El Salvador
12 May 2000
Red clay (outdoors)

Ecuador
3

			1	2	3
1	(Bolivia) (Ecuador)	Daniela Álvarez; Alexandra Guzmán	1; 6	2; 6
2	(Bolivia) (Ecuador)	Viviana Rivero; Paola Guerrero	0; 6	1; 6
3	(Bolivia) (Ecuador)	Viviana Rivero / Natasha Villarroel; Paola Guerrero / Nuria Niemes	6; 0	4; 6	1; 6

==== Trinidad and Tobago vs. El Salvador ====
Trinidad and Tobago
1
Maya C.C., La Libertad, El Salvador
12 May 2000
Red clay (outdoors)

El Salvador
2

			1	2	3
1	(Trinidad and Tobago) (El Salvador)	Sheenagh Cosgrove; Marcela Rodezno	1; 6	2; 6
2	(Trinidad and Tobago) (El Salvador)	Anneliese Rose; Claudia Argumedo	6; 4	6; 0
3	(Trinidad and Tobago) (El Salvador)	Sheenagh Cosgrove / Anneliese Rose; Liz Cruz / Marcela Rodezno	6; 4	4; 6	6; 6

==== Guatemala vs. Bahamas ====
Guatemala
0
Maya C.C., La Libertad, El Salvador
12 May 2000
Red clay (outdoors)

Bahamas
3

			1	2	3
1	(Guatemala) (The Bahamas)	María-Paz Orero; Larikah Russell	2; 6	1; 6
2	(Guatemala) (The Bahamas)	Luise-Elfride López; Nikkita Fountain	3; 6	6; 3	5; 7
3	(Guatemala) (The Bahamas)	Lucía Henkle Gómez / Luise-Elfride López; Nikkita Fountain / Larikah Russell	4; 6	3; 6

==== Barbados vs. Costa Rica ====
Barbados
0
Maya C.C., La Libertad, El Salvador
12 May 2000
Red clay (outdoors)

Costa Rica
3

			1	2	3
1	(Barbados) (Costa Rica)	Ariana Marshall; Paula Umaña	4; 6	0; 6
2	(Barbados) (Costa Rica)	Elena Branker; Melissa Mendieta	1; 6	3; 6
3	(Barbados) (Costa Rica)	Anna-Lee Bryant / Ariana Marshall; Milena Leiva / Paula Umaña	4; 6	4; 6

==== Bermuda vs. Panama ====
Bermuda
2
Maya C.C., La Libertad, El Salvador
12 May 2000
Red clay (outdoors)

Panama
1

			1	2	3
1	(Bermuda) (Panama)	Danielle Paynter; Yimara Figueroa	7; 5	6; 4
2	(Bermuda) (Panama)	Zarah De Silva; Karla Hall González	6; 4	1; 6	5; 7
3	(Bermuda) (Panama)	Zarah De Silva / Danielle Paynter; Yimara Figueroa / Karla Hall González	7^{7} 6^{0}	6; 0

==== Antigua and Barbuda vs. Jamaica ====
Antigua and Barbuda
2
Maya C.C., La Libertad, El Salvador
12 May 2000
Red clay (outdoors)

Jamaica
1

			1	2	3
1	(Antigua and Barbuda) (Jamaica)	Niki Williams; Tinesta Rowe	4; 6	4; 6
2	(Antigua and Barbuda) (Jamaica)	Isoke Perry; Asha Jaja	6; 3	6; 3
3	(Antigua and Barbuda) (Jamaica)	Isoke Perry / Niki Williams; Asha Jaja / Tinesta Rowe	4; 6	4; 6

=== Repechage Round ===
==== Puerto Rico vs. Bolivia ====
Puerto Rico
0
Maya C.C., La Libertad, El Salvador
13 May 2000
Red clay (outdoors)

Bolivia
3

			1	2	3
1	(Puerto Rico) (Bolivia)	Edna Vásquez; Daniela Álvarez	0; 6	1; 6
2	(Puerto Rico) (Bolivia)	Jessica Roland-Rosario; Viviana Rivero	0; 6	7^{7} 6^{4}	2; 6
3	(Puerto Rico) (Bolivia)	Tari Ann Toró / Edna Vásquez; Viviana Rivero / Natasha Villarroel	2; 6	2; 6

==== Trinidad and Tobago vs. Guatemala ====
Trinidad and Tobago
3
Maya C.C., La Libertad, El Salvador
13 May 2000
Red clay (outdoors)

Guatemala
0

			1	2	3
1	(Trinidad and Tobago) (Guatemala)	Sheenagh Cosgrove; Lucía Henkle Gómez	6; 2	3; 6	6; 3
2	(Trinidad and Tobago) (Guatemala)	Anneliese Rose; Luise-Elfride López	6; 2	6; 1
3	(Trinidad and Tobago) (Guatemala)	Cindra Maharaj / Lisa Fung-Kee-Fung; Luise-Elfride López / Lucía Henkle Gómez	7; 5	6; 3

==== Barbados vs. Panama ====
Barbados
1
Maya C.C., La Libertad, El Salvador
13 May 2000
Red clay (outdoors)

Panama
2

			1	2	3
1	(Barbados) (Panama)	Ariana Marshall; Yimara Figueroa	6; 4	6; 4
2	(Barbados) (Panama)	Elena Branker; Karla Hall González	0; 6	2; 6
3	(Barbados) (Panama)	Elena Branker / Ariana Marshall; Lilly Cal Fong / Yimara Figueroa	6; 3	5; 7	3; 6

=== Second round ===
==== Dominican Republic vs. Ecuador ====
Dominican Republic
0
Maya C.C., La Libertad, El Salvador
13 May 2000
Red clay (outdoors)

Ecuador
3

			1	2	3
1	(Dominican Republic) (Ecuador)	Glenny Cepeda; Paola Guerrero	2; 6	6; 4	2; 6
2	(Dominican Republic) (Ecuador)	Daysi Espinal; Myriam Cuevas	3; 6	2; 6
3	(Dominican Republic) (Ecuador)	Daysi Espinal / Carla Prieto; Paola Guerrero / Alexandra Guzmán	0; 6	2; 6

==== El Salvador vs. Bahamas ====
El Salvador
0
Maya C.C., La Libertad, El Salvador
13 May 2000
Red clay (outdoors)

Bahamas
3

			1	2	3
1	(El Salvador) (The Bahamas)	Marcela Rodezno; Larikah Russell	1; 6	0; 6
2	(El Salvador) (The Bahamas)	Claudia Argumedo; Nikkita Fountain	3; 6	3; 6
3	(El Salvador) (The Bahamas)	Liz Cruz / Marcela Rodezno; Nikkita Fountain / Larikah Russell	2; 6	2; 6

==== Costa Rica vs. Bermuda ====
Costa Rica
3
Maya C.C., La Libertad, El Salvador
13 May 2000
Red clay (outdoors)

Bermuda
0

			1	2	3
1	(Costa Rica) (Bermuda)	Érika Villalobos Morsink; Danielle Paynter	6; 0	6; 1
2	(Costa Rica) (Bermuda)	Melissa Mendieta; Zarah De Silva	2; 6	6; 3	7; 5
3	(Costa Rica) (Bermuda)	Milena Leiva / Érika Villalobos Morsink; Tara Lambert / Danielle Paynter	6; 1	6; 0

== Final Placements ==
Placing	Teams
First	Ecuador
Second	Dominican Republic
Third	Bolivia
Fourth	Puerto Rico
Fifth	Bahamas
Sixth	El Salvador
Seventh	Trinidad and Tobago
Eighth	Guatemala
Ninth	Costa Rica
Tenth	Bermuda
Eleventh	Panama
Twelfth	Barbados
Thirteenth	Jamaica
Fourteenth	Antigua and Barbuda

- Ecuador and Dominican Republic advanced to Group I for next year, where they both placed last in their respective pools of four and five. Thus both teams were relegated back to Group II for 2002.

== See also ==
- Fed Cup structure
