= 2000 Fed Cup Americas Zone =

Subsection of tennis competition

The Americas Zone was one of three zones of regional competition in the 2000 Fed Cup.

== Group I ==
- Venue: Santinho Coast, Florianópolis, Brazil (outdoor clay)
- Date: 25–30 April

The ten teams were divided into two pools of five teams. The teams that finished first in the pools played-off to determine which team would partake in the World Group play-offs next year. The two nations coming last in the pools were relegated to Group II for 2001.

=== Pools ===
	Pool A	CAN	VEN	BRA	URU	CHI
1	Canada (4–0)		2–1	3–0	3–0	3–0
2	Venezuela (3–1)	1–2		2–1	3–0	3–0
3	Brazil (2–2)	0–3	1–2		2–1	3–0
4	Uruguay (1–3)	0–3	0–3	1–2		3–0
5	Chile (0–4)	0–3	0–3	0–3	0–3	

	Pool B	ARG	COL	MEX	PAR	CUB
1	Argentina (4–0)		3–0	3–0	3–0	3–0
2	Colombia (3–1)	0–3		2–1	3–0	3–0
3	Mexico (2–2)	0–3	1–2		3–0	3–0
4	Paraguay (1–3)	0–3	0–3	0–3		2–1
5	Cuba (0–4)	0–3	0–3	0–3	1–2	

=== Play-off ===
Canada
1
Santinho Coast, Florianópolis, Brazil
18 April 2000
Red clay (outdoors)

Argentina
2

			1	2	3
1	(Canada) (Argentina)	Jana Nejedly; Gisela Dulko	6; 3	7; 5
2	(Canada) (Argentina)	Sonya Jeyaseelan; María Emilia Salerni	4; 6	5; 7
3	(Canada) (Argentina)	Maureen Drake / Sonya Jeyaseelan; Laura Montalvo / María Emilia Salerni	1; 6	3; 6

- Argentina advanced to 2001 World Group play-offs.
- Chile and Cuba relegated to Group II in 2001.

== Group II ==
- Venue: Maya C.C., La Libertad, El Salvador (outdoor clay)
- Date: 9–13 May

The fourteen teams were randomly divided into two pools of four and two pools of three teams to compete in round-robin competitions. The play-off stage of the group was used to determine placings. The top two teams from each pool would be drawn in a knockout stage to determine which teams would be promoted, while the remaining teams played-off to determine the other placings.

=== Pools ===
	Pool A	DOM	TRI	BAR
1	Dominican Republic (2–0)		2–1	3–0
2	Trinidad and Tobago (1–1)	1–2		2–1
3	Barbados (0–2)	0–3	1–2	

	Pool B	ECU	BAH	PAN	ATG
1	Ecuador (3–0)		3–0	3–0	3–0
2	Bahamas (2–1)	0–3		3–0	3–0
3	Panama (1–2)	0–3	0–3		2–1
4	Antigua and Barbuda (0–3)	0–3	0–3	1–2	

	Pool C	PUR	GUA	BER	JAM
1	Puerto Rico (3–0)		3–0	3–0	3–0
2	Guatemala (2–1)	0–3		3–0	2–1
3	Bermuda (1–2)	0–3	0–3		2–1
4	Jamaica (0–3)	0–3	1–2	1–2	

	Pool D	BOL	ESA	CRC
1	Bolivia (2–0)		2–1	3–0
2	El Salvador (1–1)	1–2		2–1
3	Costa Rica (0–2)	0–3	1–2	

=== Play-offs ===
Play-offs
Puerto Rico	0
Bolivia	3

First round
Dominican Republic	2
Puerto Rico	1
Bolivia	0
Ecuador	3

Second round
Dominican Republic	0
Ecuador	3

Play-offs
Puerto Rico	0
Bolivia	3

First round
Dominican Republic	2
Puerto Rico	1
Bolivia	0
Ecuador	3

Second round
Dominican Republic	0
Ecuador	3

Play-offs
Barbados	1
Panama	2

First round
Barbados	0
Costa Rica	3
Bermuda	2
Panama	1

Second round
Costa Rica	3
Bermuda	0

First round 12 May
Antigua and Barbuda	1
Jamaica	2

- Ecuador and Dominican Republic advanced to Group I for 2001.

== See also ==
- Fed Cup structure
