= 2002 Fed Cup Americas Zone Group II – Pool A =

International tennis competition

Group A of the 2002 Fed Cup Americas Zone Group II was one of two pools in the Americas Zone Group II of the 2002 Fed Cup. Six teams competed in a round robin competition, with the top team advancing to Group I in 2003.

	(El Salvador) ESA	(Dominican Republic) DOM	(Bolivia) BOL	(Chile) CHI	(Panama) PAN	(Bermuda) BER	Match; W–L	Set; W–L	Game; W–L	Standings
El Salvador		3–0	1–2	3–0	3–0	3–0	4–1	27–9	198–121	1
Dominican Republic	0–3		2–1	2–1	3–0	3–0	4–1	22–10	167–103	2
Bolivia	2–1	1–2		3–0	3–0	3–0	4–1	21–11	165–119	3
Chile	0–3	1–2	0–3		2–1	3–0	2–3	18–16	154–128	4
Panama	0–3	0–3	0–3	1–2		2–1	1–4	7–23	70–158	5
Bermuda	0–3	0–3	0–3	0–3	1–2		0–5	2–28	53–174	6

== El Salvador vs. Bermuda ==
El Salvador
3
Havana, Cuba
14 May 2002
Hard (outdoors)

Bermuda
0

			1	2	3
1	(El Salvador) (Bermuda)	Marcela Rodezno; Danielle Paynter	6; 1	6; 1
2	(El Salvador) (Bermuda)	Liz Cruz; Zarah De Silva	6; 2	6; 0
3	(El Salvador) (Bermuda)	Miriam Cruz / Ana Osorio; Sasha Fisher / Tara Lambert	6; 2	6; 2

== Dominican Republic vs. Bolivia ==
Dominican Republic
2
Havana, Cuba
14 May 2002
Hard (outdoors)

Bolivia
1

			1	2	3
1	(Dominican Republic) (Bolivia)	Carla Prieto; Daniela Álvarez	5; 7	1; 6
2	(Dominican Republic) (Bolivia)	Glenny Cepeda; Mónica Poveda	6; 0	6; 4
3	(Dominican Republic) (Bolivia)	Glenny Cepeda / Carla Prieto; Daniela Álvarez / Viviana Rivero	6; 4	6; 4

== Chile vs. Panama ==
Chile
2
Havana, Cuba
14 May 2002
Hard (outdoors)

Panama
1

			1	2	3
1	(Chile) (Panama)	Valentina Castro; Yeniseik Gómez	6; 0	6; 3
2	(Chile) (Panama)	Carolina Aravena; Anabelle Espinosa Rodríguez	2; 6	6; 4	4; 6
3	(Chile) (Panama)	Valentina Castro / Macarena Miranda; Anabelle Espinosa Rodríguez / Yimara Figueroa	6; 1	6; 0

== El Salvador vs. Chile ==
El Salvador
3
Havana, Cuba
15 May 2002
Hard (outdoors)

Chile
0

			1	2	3
1	(El Salvador) (Chile)	Marcela Rodezno; Valentina Castro	2; 6	7; 5	6; 4
2	(El Salvador) (Chile)	Liz Cruz; Carolina Aravena	6; 1	2; 6	6; 2
3	(El Salvador) (Chile)	Liz Cruz / Ana Osorio; Valentina Castro / Macarena Miranda	6; 3	6; 2

== Dominican Republic vs. Panama ==
Dominican Republic
2
Havana, Cuba
15 May 2002
Hard (outdoors)

Panama
1

			1	2	3
1	(Dominican Republic) (Panama)	Carla Prieto; Anais Marie Moreno	6; 0	6; 0
2	(Dominican Republic) (Panama)	Glenny Cepeda; Anabelle Espinosa Rodríguez	6; 0	6; 3
3	(Dominican Republic) (Panama)	Daysi Espinal / Carla Prieto; Yimara Figueroa / Yeniseik Gómez	6; 0	6; 1

== Bolivia vs. Bermuda ==
Bolivia
3
Havana, Cuba
15 May 2002
Hard (outdoors)

Bermuda
0

			1	2	3
1	(Bolivia) (Bermuda)	Daniela Álvarez; Danielle Paynter	6; 0	6; 2
2	(Bolivia) (Bermuda)	Mónica Poveda; Zarah De Silva	6; 0	6; 0
3	(Bolivia) (Bermuda)	Mónica Hoz De Vila / Mónica Poveda; Sasha Fisher / Tara Lambert	6; 1	7; 5

== El Salvador vs. Bolivia ==
El Salvador
1
Havana, Cuba
16 May 2002
Hard (outdoors)

Bolivia
2

			1	2	3
1	(El Salvador) (Bolivia)	Marcela Rodezno; Daniela Álvarez	6; 4	1; 6	1; 6
2	(El Salvador) (Bolivia)	Liz Cruz; Mónica Poveda	4; 6	6^{0} 7^{7}
3	(El Salvador) (Bolivia)	Liz Cruz / Ana Osorio; Mónica Hoz De Vila / Viviana Rivero	5; 7	6; 2	9; 7

== Dominican Republic vs. Chile ==
Dominican Republic
2
Havana, Cuba
16 May 2002
Hard (outdoors)

Chile
1

			1	2	3
1	(Dominican Republic) (Chile)	Carla Prieto; Valentina Castro	1; 6	2; 6
2	(Dominican Republic) (Chile)	Glenny Cepeda; Carolina Aravena	6; 4	6; 2
3	(Dominican Republic) (Chile)	Glenny Cepeda / Carla Prieto; Valentina Castro / Macarena Miranda	7; 5	6; 2

== Panama vs. Bermuda ==
Panama
2
Havana, Cuba
16 May 2002
Hard (outdoors)

Bermuda
1

			1	2	3
1	(Panama) (Bermuda)	Yimara Figueroa; Danielle Paynter	2; 6	2; 6
2	(Panama) (Bermuda)	Anabelle Espinosa Rodríguez; Zarah De Silva	6; 4	6; 4
3	(Panama) (Bermuda)	Anabelle Espinosa Rodríguez / Yimara Figueroa; Sasha Fisher / Tara Lambert	7^{8} 6^{6}	6; 3

== El Salvador vs. Dominican Republic ==
El Salvador
3
Havana, Cuba
17 May 2002
Hard (outdoors)

Dominican Republic
0

			1	2	3
1	(El Salvador) (Dominican Republic)	Marcela Rodezno; Daysi Espinal	6; 3	7^{7} 6^{3}
2	(El Salvador) (Dominican Republic)	Liz Cruz; Glenny Cepeda	6; 3	5; 7	6; 2
3	(El Salvador) (Dominican Republic)	Miriam Cruz / Ana Osorio; Glenny Cepeda / Carla Prieto	4; 6	7^{7} 6^{3}	6; 4

== Bolivia vs. Panama ==
Bolivia
3
Havana, Cuba
17 May 2002
Hard (outdoors)

Panama
0

			1	2	3
1	(Bolivia) (Panama)	Daniela Álvarez; Yeniseik Gómez	6; 1	6; 0
2	(Bolivia) (Panama)	Mónica Poveda; Anabelle Espinosa Rodríguez	0; 6	3; 0		retired
3	(Bolivia) (Panama)	Mónica Hoz De Vila / Viviana Rivero; Yimara Figueroa / Yeniseik Gómez	6; 1	6; 1

== Chile vs. Bermuda ==
Chile
3
Havana, Cuba
17 May 2002
Hard (outdoors)

Bermuda
0

			1	2	3
1	(Chile) (Bermuda)	Valentina Castro; Danielle Paynter	6; 1	6; 0
2	(Chile) (Bermuda)	Carolina Aravena; Zarah De Silva	6; 1	6; 0
3	(Chile) (Bermuda)	Valentina Castro / Macarena Miranda; Tara Lambert / Danielle Paynter	6; 0	6; 0

== El Salvador vs. Panama ==
El Salvador
3
Havana, Cuba
17 May 2002
Hard (outdoors)

Panama
0

			1	2	3
1	(El Salvador) (Panama)	Marcela Rodezno; Yeniseik Gómez	6; 0	6; 0
2	(El Salvador) (Panama)	Liz Cruz; Yimara Figueroa	6; 1	6; 1
3	(El Salvador) (Panama)	Miriam Cruz / Ana Osorio; Yimara Figueroa / Anais Marie Moreno	6; 0	6; 0

== Dominican Republic vs. Bermuda ==
Dominican Republic
3
Havana, Cuba
18 May 2002
Hard (outdoors)

Bermuda
0

			1	2	3
1	(Dominican Republic) (Bermuda)	Carla Prieto; Sasha Fisher	6; 2	6; 0
2	(Dominican Republic) (Bermuda)	Glenny Cepeda; Danielle Paynter	6; 0	6; 0
3	(Dominican Republic) (Bermuda)	Yadira Geara / Carla Prieto; Tara Lambert / Danielle Paynter	6; 4	6; 0

== Bolivia vs. Chile ==
Bolivia
2
Havana, Cuba
18 May 2002
Hard (outdoors)

Chile
1

			1	2	3
1	(Bolivia) (Chile)	Daniela Álvarez; Valentina Castro	5; 7	2; 6
2	(Bolivia) (Chile)	Mónica Poveda; Carolina Aravena	6; 2	6; 1
3	(Bolivia) (Chile)	Daniela Álvarez / Mónica Poveda; Valentina Castro / Macarena Miranda	6; 0	5; 7	7; 5

- El Salvador placed first in the pool, and thus advanced to Group I in 2003, where they placed second in their pool of four.

== See also ==
- Fed Cup structure
