= 2002 Fed Cup Americas Zone Group I – Pool A =

International tennis competition

Group A of the 2002 Fed Cup Americas Zone Group I was one of two pools in the Americas Zone Group I of the 2002 Fed Cup. Four teams competed in a round robin competition, with the top teams coming first and second advancing to the play-offs, and the bottom team being relegated down to 2003 Group II.

	(Canada) CAN	(Mexico) MEX	(The Bahamas) BAH	(Puerto Rico) PUR	RR; W–L	Set; W–L	Game; W–L	Standings
Canada		3–0	3–0	3–0	3–0	18–0	110–32	1
Mexico	0–3		2–1	3–0	2–1	9–8	84–61	2
Bahamas	0–3	1–2		2–1	1–2	6–13	50–101	3
Puerto Rico	0–3	0–3	1–2		0–3	2–14	40–90	4

== Canada vs. Puerto Rico ==
Canada
3
San Luis Potosí, Mexico
23 April 2002
Hard (outdoors)

Puerto Rico
0

			1	2	3
1	(Canada) (Puerto Rico)	Maureen Drake; Mari Toró	6; 1	6; 1
2	(Canada) (Puerto Rico)	Jana Nejedly; Karmelina Rivera	6; 3	6; 1
3	(Canada) (Puerto Rico)	Maureen Drake / Vanessa Webb; Karmelina Rivera / Mari Toró	6; 1	6; 0

== Mexico vs. Bahamas ==
Mexico
2
San Luis Potosí, Mexico
23 April 2002
Hard (outdoors)

Bahamas
1

			1	2	3
1	(Mexico) (The Bahamas)	María José López Herrera; Larikah Russell	6; 2	3; 6	4; 6
2	(Mexico) (The Bahamas)	Erika Valdés; Nikkita Fountain	6; 2	6; 1
3	(Mexico) (The Bahamas)	Jessica Fernández / Erika Valdés; Nikkita Fountain / Larikah Russell	6; 1	6; 0

== Canada vs. Bahamas ==
Canada
3
San Luis Potosí, Mexico
24 April 2002
Hard (outdoors)

Bahamas
0

			1	2	3
1	(Canada) (The Bahamas)	Maureen Drake; Larikah Russell	6; 0	6; 0
2	(Canada) (The Bahamas)	Jana Nejedly; Nikkita Fountain	6; 1	6; 0
3	(Canada) (The Bahamas)	Maureen Drake / Vanessa Webb; Nikkita Fountain / Larikah Russell	6; 0	6; 1

== Mexico vs. Puerto Rico ==
Mexico
3
San Luis Potosí, Mexico
24 April 2002
Hard (outdoors)

Puerto Rico
0

			1	2	3
1	(Mexico) (Puerto Rico)	Melissa Torres Sandoval; Mari Toró	6; 3	6; 2
2	(Mexico) (Puerto Rico)	Jessica Fernández; María Calbetó	6; 0	6; 0
3	(Mexico) (Puerto Rico)	Jessica Fernández / Erika Valdés; Karmelina Rivera / Mari Toró				w/o

== Canada vs. Mexico ==
Canada
3
San Luis Potosí, Mexico
25 April 2002
Hard (outdoors)

Mexico
0

			1	2	3
1	(Canada) (Mexico)	Maureen Drake; Melissa Torres Sandoval	7^{7} 6^{4}	6; 3
2	(Canada) (Mexico)	Jana Nejedly; Jessica Fernández	6; 4	6; 1
3	(Canada) (Mexico)	Maureen Drake / Vanessa Webb; Jessica Fernández / Melissa Torres Sandoval	6; 4	7; 5

== Bahamas vs. Puerto Rico ==
Bahamas
2
San Luis Potosí, Mexico
25 April 2002
Hard (outdoors)

Puerto Rico
1

			1	2	3
1	(The Bahamas) (Puerto Rico)	Larikah Russell; Mari Toró	1; 6	3; 6
2	(The Bahamas) (Puerto Rico)	Nikkita Fountain; Karmelina Rivera	7; 5	6; 4
3	(The Bahamas) (Puerto Rico)	Nikkita Fountain / Larikah Russell; Karmelina Rivera / Mari Toró	7^{8} 6^{6}	6; 1

- Puerto Rico failed to win any ties in the pool, and thus was relegated to Group II in 2003. They placed first in their pool of five, and thus immediately advanced back to Group I for 2004.

== See also ==
- Fed Cup structure
