= 2000 Fed Cup Americas Zone Group II – Pool D =

Subsection of tennis competition

Group D of the 2000 Fed Cup Americas Zone Group II was one of four pools in the Americas Zone Group II of the 2000 Fed Cup. Three teams competed in a round robin competition, with each team being assigned to its respective play-off region.

	(Bolivia) BOL	(El Salvador) ESA	(Costa Rica) CRC	RR; W–L	Set; W–L	Game; W–L	Standings
Bolivia		2–1	3–0	2–0	11–3	74–43	1
El Salvador	1–2		2–1	1–1	6–8	62–63	2
Costa Rica	0–3	1–2		0–2	4–10	46–76	3

== El Salvador vs. Costa Rica ==
El Salvador
2
Maya C.C., La Libertad, El Salvador
9 May 2000
Red clay (outdoors)

Costa Rica
1

			1	2	3
1	(El Salvador) (Costa Rica)	Marcela Rodezno; Melissa Mendieta	6; 3	4; 6	6; 2
2	(El Salvador) (Costa Rica)	Claudia Argumedo; Milena Leiva	6; 1	6; 3
3	(El Salvador) (Costa Rica)	Liz Cruz / Marcela Rodezno; Paula Umaña / Érika Villalobos Morsink	3; 6	6^{3} 7^{7}

== Bolivia vs. El Salvador ==
Bolivia
2
Maya C.C., La Libertad, El Salvador
10 May 2000
Red clay (outdoors)

El Salvador
1

			1	2	3
1	(Bolivia) (El Salvador)	Daniela Álvarez; Marcela Rodezno	6; 2	6; 1
2	(Bolivia) (El Salvador)	Mónica Poveda; Claudia Argumedo	6; 0	7^{7} 6^{3}
3	(Bolivia) (El Salvador)	Viviana Rivero / Natasha Villarroel; Liz Cruz / Marcela Rodezno	2; 6	6; 4	2; 6

== Bolivia vs. Costa Rica ==
Bolivia
3
Maya C.C., La Libertad, El Salvador
11 May 2000
Red clay (outdoors)

Costa Rica
0

			1	2	3
1	(Bolivia) (Costa Rica)	Daniela Álvarez; Érika Villalobos Morsnik	6; 1	6; 1
2	(Bolivia) (Costa Rica)	Viviana Rivero; Melissa Mendieta	2; 6	6; 0	6; 3
3	(Bolivia) (Costa Rica)	Viviana Rivero / Natasha Villarroel; Paula Umaña / Érika Villalobos Morsink	7^{7} 6^{5}	6; 1

== See also ==
- Fed Cup structure
