= Tennis at the 2002 Central American and Caribbean Games =

- Location: San Salvador

The tennis competition at the 2002 Central American and Caribbean Games was held in San Salvador, El Salvador.

== Medal summary ==
=== Men's events ===
Event	Gold	Silver	Bronze
Singles	Michael Quintero (COL)	Kepler Orellana (VEN)	Miguel Gallardo (MEX); Marcello Amador (MEX)
Doubles	Bruno Echagaray and Santiago González (MEX)	Alejandro Falla and Carlos Salamanca (COL)	Shane Stone and Troy Stone (TRI); Kepler Orellana and Jimy Szymanski (VEN)
Team Event	Marcello Amador; Bruno Echagaray; Miguel Gallardo; Santiago González (MEX)	Víctor Estrella; Jhonson García (DOM)	Jhonnatan Medina; Kepler Orellana; Jimy Szymanski (VEN); Alejandro Falla; Pablo González; Michael Quintero; Carlos Salamanca (COL)

=== Women's events ===
Event	Gold	Silver	Bronze
Singles	Kristina Brandi (PUR)	Vilmarie Castellvi (PUR)	Karin Palme (MEX); Melissa Torres Sandoval (MEX)
Doubles	Vilmarie Castellvi and Mari Toro (PUR)	Erika Clarke and Melissa Torres Sandoval (MEX)	Mariela Salinas and Stephanie Schaer (VEN); Liz Cruz and Ana Osorio (ESA)
Team Event	Kristina Brandi; Vilmarie Castellvi (PUR)	Karin Palme; Alejandra Rivero; Melissa Torres Sandoval (MEX)	Glenny Cepeda; Daisy Espinal; Diana Espinal (DOM); Liz Cruz; Ana Osorio; Marcela Rodezno (ESA)

=== Mixed event ===
Event	Gold	Silver	Bronze
Doubles	Gabriel Montilla and Kristina Brandi (PUR)	Santiago González and Melissa Torres Sandoval (MEX)	Iphton Louis and Neyssa Etienne (HAI); Jhonnatan Medina and Stephanie Schaer (VEN)
