= 2003 Fed Cup Americas Zone Group I – play-offs =

The play-offs of the 2003 Fed Cup Americas Zone Group I were the final stages of the Group I Zonal Competition involving teams from the Americas. Those that qualified for this stage placed first and second in their respective pools.

Placing	Pool A	Pool B
1	Canada	Brazil
2	Mexico	El Salvador
3	Uruguay	Cuba
4	Bahamas	Paraguay

The four teams were then paired up the team from a different placing of the other group for a play-off tie, with the winners being promoted to the World Group play-offs.

== Canada vs. El Salvador ==
Canada
2
Campinas, Brazil
26 April 2003
Red clay (outdoors)

El Salvador
0

			1	2	3
1	(Canada) (El Salvador)	Jana Nejedly; Marcela Rodezno	6; 0	6; 1
2	(Canada) (El Salvador)	Maureen Drake; Liz Cruz	6; 0	6; 0
3	(Canada) (El Salvador)	Marie-Ève Pelletier / Vanessa Webb; Liz Cruz / Marcela Rodezno				not played

- Canada advanced to the World Group play-offs, where they were drawn against Austria. They lost 1–4, and thus were relegated back to Group I for 2004.

== Mexico vs. Brazil ==
Mexico
0
Campinas, Brazil
26 April 2003
Red clay (outdoors)

Brazil
2

			1	2	3
1	(Mexico) (Brazil)	Jessica Fernández; Bruna Colósio	3; 6	5; 7
2	(Mexico) (Brazil)	Melissa Torres Sandoval; Maria Fernanda Alves	2; 6	3; 6
3	(Mexico) (Brazil)	Jessica Fernández / Melissa Torres Sandoval; Maria Fernanda Alves / Bruna Colósio				not played

- Brazil advanced to the World Group play-offs, where they were drawn against Croatia. They lost 1–4, and thus were relegated back to Group I for 2004.

== See also ==
- Fed Cup structure
