= 2002 Fed Cup Americas Zone Group I – Pool B =

International tennis competition

Group B of the 2002 Fed Cup Americas Zone Group I was one of two pools in the Americas Zone Group I of the 2002 Fed Cup. Four teams competed in a round robin competition, with the top teams coming first and second advancing to the play-offs, and the bottom team being relegated down to 2003 Group II.

	(Colombia) COL	(Uruguay) URU	(Paraguay) PAR	(Brazil) BRA	(Venezuela) VEN	RR; W–L	Set; W–L	Game; W–L	Standings
Colombia		2–1	3–0	3–0	3–0	4–0	22–2	139–53	1
Uruguay	1–2		3–0	2–1	2–1	3–1	16–11	137–122	2
Paraguay	0–3	0–3		2–1	2–1	2–2	8–17	87–135	3
Brazil	0–3	1–2	1–2		3–0	1–3	14–14	136–125	4
Venezuela	0–3	1–2	1–2	0–3		0–4	5–21	95–149	5

== Colombia vs. Venezuela ==
Colombia
3
San Luis Potosí, Mexico
22 April 2002
Hard (outdoors)

Venezuela
0

			1	2	3
1	(Colombia) (Venezuela)	Catalina Castaño; Mariela Salinas	6; 2	6; 3
2	(Colombia) (Venezuela)	Fabiola Zuluaga; Stephanie Schaer	6; 3	6; 3
3	(Colombia) (Venezuela)	Catalina Castaño / Fabiola Zuluaga; Mariela Salinas / Stephanie Schaer	6; 1	6; 4

== Uruguay vs. Paraguay ==
Uruguay
3
San Luis Potosí, Mexico
22 April 2002
Hard (outdoors)

Paraguay
0

			1	2	3
1	(Uruguay) (Paraguay)	Ana Lucía Migliarini de León; Larissa Schaerer	6; 3	6; 3
2	(Uruguay) (Paraguay)	Daniela Olivera; Mónica Acosta	6; 0	6; 1
3	(Uruguay) (Paraguay)	Daniela Olivera / Claudia Salgues; María Alejandra García / Larissa Schaerer	6; 4	6; 3

== Colombia vs. Uruguay ==
Colombia
3
San Luis Potosí, Mexico
23 April 2002
Hard (outdoors)

Uruguay
0

			1	2	3
1	(Colombia) (Uruguay)	Catalina Castaño; Ana Lucía Migliarini de León	6; 0	6; 3
2	(Colombia) (Uruguay)	Fabiola Zuluaga; Daniela Olivera	6; 2	6; 3
3	(Colombia) (Uruguay)	Catalina Castaño / Fabiola Zuluaga; Daniela Olivera / Claudia Salgues	7^{7} 6^{1}	7; 5

== Brazil vs. Venezuela ==
Brazil
3
San Luis Potosí, Mexico
23 April 2002
Hard (outdoors)

Venezuela
0

			1	2	3
1	(Brazil) (Venezuela)	Carla Tiene; Mariela Salinas	5; 7	6; 4	7; 5
2	(Brazil) (Venezuela)	Joana Cortez; Stephanie Schaer	6; 3	6; 2
3	(Brazil) (Venezuela)	Joana Cortez / Vanessa Menga; Stephanie Schaer / Avel-Romaly Coronado	6; 1	6; 1

== Colombia vs. Paraguay ==
Colombia
3
San Luis Potosí, Mexico
24 April 2002
Hard (outdoors)

Paraguay
0

			1	2	3
1	(Colombia) (Paraguay)	Catalina Castaño; María Alejandra García	6; 0	6; 0
2	(Colombia) (Paraguay)	Fabiola Zuluaga; Mónica Acosta	6; 0	6; 4
3	(Colombia) (Paraguay)	Catalina Castaño / Fabiola Zuluaga; Mónica Acosta / María Alejandra García	6; 5	7; 1

== Uruguay vs. Brazil ==
Uruguay
3
San Luis Potosí, Mexico
24 April 2002
Hard (outdoors)

Brazil
0

			1	2	3
1	(Uruguay) (Brazil)	Ana Lucía Migliarini de León; Carla Tiene	7^{7} 6^{3}	4; 6	6; 6
2	(Uruguay) (Brazil)	Daniela Olivera; Joana Cortez	6; 4	7^{11} 6^{9}
3	(Uruguay) (Brazil)	Daniela Olivera / Claudia Salgues; Joana Cortez / Vanessa Menga	6; 4	1; 6	3; 6

== Uruguay vs. Venezuela ==
Uruguay
2
San Luis Potosí, Mexico
25 April 2002
Hard (outdoors)

Venezuela
1

			1	2	3
1	(Uruguay) (Venezuela)	Ana Lucía Migliarini de León; Mariela Salinas	6; 0	7; 5
2	(Uruguay) (Venezuela)	Daniela Olivera; Stephanie Schaer	6; 2	6; 1
3	(Uruguay) (Venezuela)	Ana Lucía Migliarini de León / Claudia Salgues; Mariela Salinas / Stephanie Schaer	6; 4	3; 6	6; 8

== Paraguay vs. Brazil ==
Paraguay
2
San Luis Potosí, Mexico
25 April 2002
Hard (outdoors)

Brazil
1

			1	2	3
1	(Paraguay) (Brazil)	Larissa Schaerer; Maria Fernanda Alves	7; 5	6; 3
2	(Paraguay) (Brazil)	Mónica Acosta; Joana Cortez	1; 6	2; 6
3	(Paraguay) (Brazil)	María Alejandra García / Larissa Schaerer; Vanessa Menga / Carla Tiene	6; 4	4; 6	6; 2

== Colombia vs. Brazil ==
Colombia
2
San Luis Potosí, Mexico
26 April 2002
Hard (outdoors)

Brazil
1

			1	2	3
1	(Colombia) (Brazil)	Catalina Castaño; Carla Tiene	6; 1	6; 2
2	(Colombia) (Brazil)	Fabiola Zuluaga; Joana Cortez	6; 1	6; 2
3	(Colombia) (Brazil)	Catalina Castaño / Romy Farah; Joana Cortez / Vanessa Menga	3; 6	1; 6

== Paraguay vs. Venezuela ==
Paraguay
2
San Luis Potosí, Mexico
26 April 2002
Hard (outdoors)

Venezuela
1

			1	2	3
1	(Paraguay) (Venezuela)	Larissa Schaerer; Mariela Salinas	7; 5	6; 4
2	(Paraguay) (Venezuela)	Mónica Acosta; Stephanie Schaer	4; 6	2; 6
3	(Paraguay) (Venezuela)	María Alejandra García / Larissa Schaerer; Avel-Romaly Coronado / Stephanie Schaer	6; 4	6; 3

- Venezuela failed to win any ties in the pool, and thus was relegated to Group II in 2003. However, they did not partake in the Fed Cup next year.

== See also ==
- Fed Cup structure
