= 2003 Fed Cup Americas Zone =

Subsection of tennis competition

The Americas Zone was one of three zones of regional competition in the 2003 Fed Cup.

== Group I ==
- Venue: Campinas, Brazil (outdoor clay)
- Date: 23–26 April

The eight teams were divided into two pools of four teams. The teams that finished first in the pools played-off against those that placed second to determine which team would partake in the World Group play-offs. The two nations coming last in the pools were relegated to Group II for 2004.

=== Pools ===
	Pool A	CAN	MEX	URU	BAH
1	Canada (3–0)		3–0	3–0	3–0
2	Mexico (2–1)	0–3		2–1	3–0
3	Uruguay (1–2)	0–3	1–2		3–0
4	Bahamas (0–3)	0–3	0–3	0–3	

	Pool B	BRA	ESA	CUB	PAR
1	Brazil (3–0)		3–0	3–0	3–0
2	El Salvador (2–1)	0–3		2–1	2–1
3	Cuba (1–2)	0–3	1–2		2–1
4	Paraguay (0–3)	0–3	1–2	0–3	

=== Play-offs ===
A Team	Score	B Team
Canada	2–0	El Salvador
Mexico	0–2	Brazil

- Canada and Brazil advanced to 2003 World Group play-offs.
- Bahamas and Paraguay was relegated to Group II for 2004.

== Group II ==
- Venue: San Juan, Puerto Rico (outdoor hard)
- Date: 23–27 April

The ten teams were divided into two pools of five. The top team from each pool then advanced to Group I for 2004.

=== Pools ===
	Pool A	PUR	ECU	VEN	DOM	CRC
1	Puerto Rico (4–0)		3–0	2–1	3–0	3–0
2	Ecuador (3–1)	0–3		2–1	2–1	3–0
3	Venezuela (2–2)	1–2	1–2		3–0	3–0
4	Dominican Republic (1–3)	0–3	1–2	0–3		3–0
5	Costa Rica (0–4)	0–3	0–3	0–3	0–3	

	Pool B	CHI	JAM	BOL	BER	TRI
1	Chile (4–0)		2–1	3–0	3–0	3–0
2	Jamaica (3–1)	1–2		3–0	3–0	3–0
3	Bolivia (2–2)	0–3	0–3		2–1	3–0
4	Bermuda (1–3)	0–3	0–3	1–2		3–0
5	Trinidad and Tobago (0–4)	0–3	0–3	0–3	0–3	

- Puerto Rico and Chile advanced to Group I in 2004.

== See also ==
- Fed Cup structure
