= 2003 Davis Cup Americas Zone Group I =

International tennis competition

The Americas Zone was one of the three zones of the regional Davis Cup competition in 2003.

In the Americas Zone there were four different tiers, called groups, in which teams competed against each other to advance to the upper tier. Winners in Group I advanced to the World Group qualifying round, along with losing teams from the World Group first round. Teams who lost their respective ties competed in the relegation play-offs, with winning teams remaining in Group I, whereas teams who lost their play-offs were relegated to the Americas Zone Group II in 2004.

== Participating nations ==
- Bahamas
- Canada
- Chile
- Ecuador
- Peru
- Venezuela

=== Draw ===
Second Round Play-offs
Maracaibo, Venezuela (hard)
Venezuela	4
Bahamas	0

First Round Play-offs
Caracas, Venezuela (hard)
Venezuela	2
Chile	3
bye
Bahamas

First Round
S	Venezuela
bye
Quito, Ecuador (clay)
Chile	2
Ecuador	3
Lima, Peru (clay)
Bahamas	0
Peru	5
bye
S	Canada

Second Round
Salinas, Ecuador (clay)
S	Venezuela	2
Ecuador	3
Calgary, Canada (indoor carpet)
Peru	0
S	Canada	5

- Bahamas relegated to Group II in 2004.
- Ecuador and Canada advance to World Group Play-off.

== First round ==
=== Ecuador vs. Chile ===
Ecuador
3
Club Buena Vista, Quito, Ecuador
7–9 February 2003
Clay

Chile
2

			1	2	3	4	5
1	(Ecuador) (Chile)	Nicolás Lapentti; Hermes Gamonal	6; 2	6; 1	7^{7} 6^{1}
2	(Ecuador) (Chile)	Giovanni Lapentti; Marcelo Ríos	6; 3	7^{7} 6^{5}	6; 3
3	(Ecuador) (Chile)	Giovanni Lapentti / Nicolás Lapentti; Hermes Gamonal / Adrián García	6; 2	6; 4	6^{3} 7^{7}	4; 6	3; 6
4	(Ecuador) (Chile)	Nicolás Lapentti; Marcelo Ríos	6; 3	4; 6	6^{0} 7^{7}	6^{5} 7^{7}
5	(Ecuador) (Chile)	Giovanni Lapentti; Hermes Gamonal	7^{7} 6^{4}	6; 4	6^{4} 7^{7}	6; 3

=== Peru vs. Bahamas ===
Peru
5
Estadio Asia, Lima, Peru
7–9 February 2003
Clay

Bahamas
0

			1	2	3	4	5
1	(Peru) (The Bahamas)	Iván Miranda; Mark Knowles	6; 4	3; 6	6; 1			retired
2	(Peru) (The Bahamas)	Luis Horna; Mark Merklein	6; 2	6; 1	6; 3
3	(Peru) (The Bahamas)	Luis Horna / Iván Miranda; Mark Merklein / Bjorn Munroe	6; 4	6; 4	7^{7} 6^{4}
4	(Peru) (The Bahamas)	Mario Monroy; Marvin Rolle	6; 4	4; 6	7; 5
5	(Peru) (The Bahamas)	William Lock; Bjorn Munroe	6; 1	6; 3

== Second round ==
=== Ecuador vs. Venezuela ===
Ecuador
3
Periferio Este - Calle 55, Salinas, Ecuador
4–6 April 2003
Clay

Venezuela
2

			1	2	3	4	5
1	(Ecuador) (Venezuela)	Giovanni Lapentti; José de Armas	7^{7} 6^{4}	6; 2	6^{4} 7^{7}			retired
2	(Ecuador) (Venezuela)	Nicolás Lapentti; Kepler Orellana	6; 4	6; 3	4; 6	5; 5		retired
3	(Ecuador) (Venezuela)	Giovanni Lapentti / Nicolás Lapentti; José de Armas / Jimy Szymanski	6; 1	6; 3	6; 3
4	(Ecuador) (Venezuela)	Nicolás Lapentti; José de Armas	3; 6	6; 4	6; 3	6; 3
5	(Ecuador) (Venezuela)	Carlos Avellán; Jhonnatan Medina-Álvarez	3; 6	2; 6

=== Canada vs. Peru ===
Canada
5
Stampede Corral, Calgary, Alberta, Canada
4–6 April 2003
Carpet (indoors)

Peru
0

			1	2	3	4	5
1	(Canada) (Peru)	Daniel Nestor; Iván Miranda	6; 2	6; 2	3; 6	6; 4
2	(Canada) (Peru)	Frank Dancevic; Diego Acuña	4; 6	7^{7} 6^{3}	3; 6	6; 3	8; 6
3	(Canada) (Peru)	Simon Larose / Daniel Nestor; Diego Acuña / Iván Miranda	7^{8} 6^{6}	6; 3	6^{5} 7^{7}	4; 6	6; 3
4	(Canada) (Peru)	Matt Klinger; William Lock	7^{7} 6^{4}	7^{9} 6^{7}
5	(Canada) (Peru)	Simon Larose; Juan-Carlos Rebaza-Lozano	6; 0	6; 1

== First round play-offs ==
=== Venezuela vs. Chile ===
Venezuela
2
National Tennis Centre, Caracas, Venezuela
11–13 July 2003
Hard

Chile
3

			1	2	3	4	5
1	(Venezuela) (Chile)	Kepler Orellana; Fernando González	4; 6	2; 6	5; 7
2	(Venezuela) (Chile)	José de Armas; Marcelo Ríos	7; 5	6; 2	3; 6	3; 6	8; 6
3	(Venezuela) (Chile)	José de Armas / Kepler Orellana; Hermes Gamonal / Fernando González	5; 7	4; 6	4; 6
4	(Venezuela) (Chile)	José de Armas; Fernando González	4; 6	4; 6	4; 6
5	(Venezuela) (Chile)	Kepler Orellana; Marcelo Ríos	7^{7} 6^{4}					retired

== Second round play-offs ==
=== Venezuela vs. Bahamas ===
Venezuela
4
Vereda del Lago, Maracaibo, Venezuela
19–21 September 2003
Hard

Bahamas
0

			1	2	3	4	5
1	(Venezuela) (The Bahamas)	Kepler Orellana; Devin Mullings	6; 3	6; 1	6; 1
2	(Venezuela) (The Bahamas)	José de Armas; Christopher Eldon	6; 4	6; 4	7; 5
3	(Venezuela) (The Bahamas)	José de Armas / Kepler Orellana; Christopher Eldon / Devin Mullings	6; 0	6; 4	6; 1
4	(Venezuela) (The Bahamas)	Jhonnatan Medina-Álvarez; Davin Russell	6; 1	6; 1
5	(Venezuela) (The Bahamas)	Kepler Orellana; Christopher Eldon						not played
