= 2000 Fed Cup Americas Zone Group II – Pool C =

Group C of the 2000 Fed Cup Americas Zone Group II was one of four pools in the Americas Zone Group II of the 2000 Fed Cup. Three teams competed in a round robin competition, with each team being assigned to its respective play-off region.

	(Puerto Rico) PUR	(Guatemala) GUA	(Bermuda) BER	(Jamaica) JAM	RR; W–L	Set; W–L	Game; W–L	Standings
Puerto Rico		3–0	3–0	3–0	3–0	18–0	108–35	1
Guatemala	0–3		3–0	2–1	2–1	10–8	81–70	2
Bermuda	0–3	0–3		2–1	1–2	5–14	64–101	3
Jamaica	0–3	1–2	1–2		0–3	4–15	54–101	4

== Puerto Rico vs. Bermuda ==
Puerto Rico
3
Maya C.C., La Libertad, El Salvador
9 May 2000
Red clay (outdoors)

Bermuda
0

			1	2	3
1	(Puerto Rico) (Bermuda)	Tari Ann Toró; Danielle Paynter	6; 0	6; 1
2	(Puerto Rico) (Bermuda)	Mari Toró; Zarah De Silva	6; 4	6; 3
3	(Puerto Rico) (Bermuda)	Mari Toró / Edna Vásquez; Danielle Downey / Tara Lambert	6; 1	6; 3

== Guatemala vs. Jamaica ==
Guatemala
2
Maya C.C., La Libertad, El Salvador
9 May 2000
Red clay (outdoors)

Jamaica
1

			1	2	3
1	(Guatemala) (Jamaica)	María-Paz Orero; Anya Moyston	6; 3	6; 2
2	(Guatemala) (Jamaica)	Luise-Elfride López; Asha Jaja	6; 1	6; 1
3	(Guatemala) (Jamaica)	Lucía Henkle Gómez / María-Paz Orero; Anya Moyston / Tinesta Rowe	3; 6	1; 6

== Puerto Rico vs. Guatemala ==
Puerto Rico
3
Maya C.C., La Libertad, El Salvador
10 May 2000
Red clay (outdoors)

Guatemala
0

			1	2	3
1	(Puerto Rico) (Guatemala)	Tari Ann Toró; María-Paz Orero	6; 2	6; 3
2	(Puerto Rico) (Guatemala)	Mari Toró; Luise-Elfride López	6; 3	6; 4
3	(Puerto Rico) (Guatemala)	Jessica Roland-Rosario / Edna Vásquez; Luise-Elfride López / María-Paz Orero	6; 1	6; 3

== Bermuda vs. Jamaica ==
Bermuda
2
Maya C.C., La Libertad, El Salvador
10 May 2000
Red clay (outdoors)

Jamaica
1

			1	2	3
1	(Bermuda) (Jamaica)	Danielle Paynter; Tinesta Rowe	6; 4	6; 0
2	(Bermuda) (Jamaica)	Zarah De Silva; Asha Jaja	7^{7} 6^{2}	6; 4
3	(Bermuda) (Jamaica)	Tara Lambert / Danielle Paynter; Anya Moyston / Tinesta Rowe	6; 2	2; 6	4; 6

== Puerto Rico vs. Jamaica ==
Puerto Rico
3
Maya C.C., La Libertad, El Salvador
11 May 2000
Red clay (outdoors)

Jamaica
0

			1	2	3
1	(Puerto Rico) (Jamaica)	Tari Ann Toró; Tinesta Rowe	6; 4	6; 0
2	(Puerto Rico) (Jamaica)	Mari Toró; Anya Moyston	6; 0	6; 0
3	(Puerto Rico) (Jamaica)	Jessica Roland-Rosario / Mari Toró; Anya Moyston / Tinesta Rowe	6; 1	6; 2

== Guatemala vs. Bermuda ==
Guatemala
3
Maya C.C., La Libertad, El Salvador
11 May 2000
Red clay (outdoors)

Bermuda
0

			1	2	3
1	(Guatemala) (Bermuda)	María-Paz Orero; Danielle Paynter	6; 2	6; 1
2	(Guatemala) (Bermuda)	Luise-Elfride López; Zarah De Silva	6; 1	7^{7} 6^{5}
3	(Guatemala) (Bermuda)	Lucía Henkle Gómez / Luise-Elfride López; Danielle Downey / Tara Lambert	6; 3	6; 2

== See also ==
- Fed Cup structure
