= 2003 Fed Cup Americas Zone Group I – Pool B =

Group B of the 2003 Fed Cup Americas Zone Group I was one of two pools in the Americas Zone Group I of the 2003 Fed Cup. Four teams competed in a round robin competition, with the top teams coming first and second advancing to the play-offs, and the bottom team being relegated down to 2004 Group II.

		(Brazil) BRA	(Cuba) CUB	(Paraguay) PAR	(El Salvador) ESA	RR; W–L	Set; W–L	Game; W–L	Standings
40	Brazil		3–0	3–0	3–0	3–0	18–0	109–30	1
43	Cuba	0–3		3–0	1–2	1–2	10–11	84–91	3
48	Paraguay	0–3	0–3		1–2	0–3	2–16	39–103	4
56	El Salvador	0–3	2–1	2–1		2–1	9–12	89–97	2

== Brazil vs. Paraguay ==
Brazil
3
Campinas, Brazil
23 April 2003
Red clay (outdoors)

Paraguay
0

			1	2	3
1	(Brazil) (Paraguay)	Bruna Colósio; Amanda Melgarejo	6; 2	6; 1
2	(Brazil) (Paraguay)	Maria Fernanda Alves; María Angela Ferreira	6; 0	6; 1
3	(Brazil) (Paraguay)	Joana Cortez / Carla Tiene; Amanda Melgarejo / Sarah Tami Masi	6; 4	6; 3

== Cuba vs. El Salvador ==
Cuba
1
Campinas, Brazil
23 April 2003
Red clay (outdoors)

El Salvador
2

			1	2	3
1	(Cuba) (El Salvador)	Yamile Fors Guerra; Marcela Rodezno	2; 6	6; 4	2; 6
2	(Cuba) (El Salvador)	Yanet Núñez Mojarena; Liz Cruz	2; 6	6; 4	6; 1
3	(Cuba) (El Salvador)	Yamile Fors Guerra / Yanet Núñez Mojarena; Liz Cruz / Marcela Rodezno	7; 5	5; 7	5; 7

== Brazil vs. El Salvador ==
Brazil
3
Campinas, Brazil
24 April 2003
Red clay (outdoors)

El Salvador
0

			1	2	3
1	(Brazil) (El Salvador)	Joana Cortez; Marcela Rodezno	7; 5	6; 4
2	(Brazil) (El Salvador)	Maria Fernanda Alves; Liz Cruz	6; 1	6; 1
3	(Brazil) (El Salvador)	Bruna Colósio / Joana Cortez; Miriam Cruz / Marcela Rodezno	6; 1	6; 1

== Cuba vs. Paraguay ==
Cuba
3
Campinas, Brazil
24 April 2003
Red clay (outdoors)

Paraguay
0

			1	2	3
1	(Cuba) (Paraguay)	Yamile Fors Guerra; Sarah Tami Masi	7; 5	6; 0
2	(Cuba) (Paraguay)	Yanet Núñez Mojarena; María Angela Ferreira	6; 0	6; 0
3	(Cuba) (Paraguay)	Yanet Núñez Mojarena / Elsa Serrano Eduards; Amanda Melgarejo / Sarah Tami Masi	6; 1	6; 3

== Brazil vs. Cuba ==
Brazil
3
Campinas, Brazil
25 April 2003
Red clay (outdoors)

Cuba
0

			1	2	3
1	(Brazil) (Cuba)	Bruna Colósio; Elsa Serrano Eduards	6; 0	6; 1
2	(Brazil) (Cuba)	Maria Fernanda Alves; Yanet Núñez Mojarena	6; 1	6; 0
3	(Brazil) (Cuba)	Bruna Colósio / Joana Cortez; Yamile Fors Guerra / Yanet Núñez Mojarena	6; 2	6; 2

== Paraguay vs. El Salvador ==
Paraguay
1
Campinas, Brazil
25 April 2003
Red clay (outdoors)

El Salvador
2

			1	2	3
1	(Paraguay) (El Salvador)	Sarah Tami Masi; Marcela Rodezno	2; 6	0; 6
2	(Paraguay) (El Salvador)	Amanda Melgarejo; Liz Cruz	1; 6	4; 6
3	(Paraguay) (El Salvador)	Amanda Melgarejo / Sarah Tami Masi; Miriam Cruz / Liz Cruz	6; 2	6; 4

- Paraguay failed to win any ties in the pool, and thus was relegated to Group II in 2004, where they placed equal first and thus advanced back up to Group I for 2005.

== See also ==
- Fed Cup structure
