= 2000 Fed Cup Americas Zone Group II – Pool B =

Group B of the 2000 Fed Cup Americas Zone Group II was one of four pools in the Americas Zone Group II of the 2000 Fed Cup. Three teams competed in a round robin competition, with each team being assigned to its respective play-off region.

	(Ecuador) ECU	(The Bahamas) BAH	(Panama) PAN	(Antigua and Barbuda) ATG	RR; W–L	Set; W–L	Game; W–L	Standings
Ecuador		3–0	3–0	3–0	3–0	18–0	108–11	1
Bahamas	0–3		3–0	3–0	2–1	12–7	79–70	2
Panama	0–3	0–3		2–1	1–2	5–14	51–98	3
Antigua and Barbuda	0–3	0–3	1–2		0–3	2–16	42–103	4

== Ecuador vs. Bahamas ==
Ecuador
3
Maya C.C., La Libertad, El Salvador
9 May 2000
Red clay (outdoors)

Bahamas
0

			1	2	3
1	(Ecuador) (The Bahamas)	Alexandra Guzmán; Larikah Russell	6; 0	6; 0
2	(Ecuador) (The Bahamas)	Myriam Cuevas; Nikkita Fountain	6; 1	6; 0
3	(Ecuador) (The Bahamas)	Paola Guerrero / Alexandra Guzmán; Nikkita Fountain / Larikah Russell	6; 3	6; 1

== Panama vs. Antigua and Barbuda ==
Panama
2
Maya C.C., La Libertad, El Salvador
9 May 2000
Red clay (outdoors)

Antigua and Barbuda
1

			1	2	3
1	(Panama) (Antigua and Barbuda)	Lilly Cal Fong; Niki Williams	2; 6	4; 6
2	(Panama) (Antigua and Barbuda)	Karla Hall González; Isoke Perry	6; 3	6; 3
3	(Panama) (Antigua and Barbuda)	Lilly Cal Fong / Karla Hall González; Francine Harvey / Niki Williams	6; 1	6; 4

== Ecuador vs. Panama ==
Ecuador
3
Maya C.C., La Libertad, El Salvador
10 May 2000
Red clay (outdoors)

Panama
0

			1	2	3
1	(Ecuador) (Panama)	Alexandra Guzmán; Lilly Cal Fong	6; 0	6; 0
2	(Ecuador) (Panama)	Paola Guerrero; Karla Hall González	6; 0	6; 1
3	(Ecuador) (Panama)	Paola Guerrero / Alexandra Guzmán; Lilly Cal Fong / Yimara Figueroa	6; 0	6; 1

== Bahamas vs. Antigua and Barbuda ==
Bahamas
3
Maya C.C., La Libertad, El Salvador
10 May 2000
Red clay (outdoors)

Antigua and Barbuda
0

			1	2	3
1	(The Bahamas) (Antigua and Barbuda)	Larikah Russell; Niki Williams	6; 1	6; 1
2	(The Bahamas) (Antigua and Barbuda)	Nikkita Fountain; Isoke Perry	6; 4	6; 2
3	(The Bahamas) (Antigua and Barbuda)	Shaniek Pinder / Larikah Russell; Lorna-May Lewis / Isoke Perry	6; 2	7; 5

== Ecuador vs. Antigua and Barbuda ==
Ecuador
3
Maya C.C., La Libertad, El Salvador
11 May 2000
Red clay (outdoors)

Antigua and Barbuda
0

			1	2	3
1	(Ecuador) (Antigua and Barbuda)	Paola Guerrero; Niki Williams	6; 0	6; 0
2	(Ecuador) (Antigua and Barbuda)	Myriam Cuevas; Isoke Perry	6; 1	6; 2
3	(Ecuador) (Antigua and Barbuda)	Paola Guerrero / Alexandra Guzmán; Isoke Perry / Niki Williams	6; 1	6; 0

== Bahamas vs. Panama ==
Bahamas
3
Maya C.C., La Libertad, El Salvador
11 May 2000
Red clay (outdoors)

Panama
0

			1	2	3
1	(The Bahamas) (Panama)	Larikah Russell; Lilly Cal Fong	6; 0	6; 1
2	(The Bahamas) (Panama)	Nikkita Fountain; Karla Hall González	1; 6	6; 2	6; 4
3	(The Bahamas) (Panama)	Shaniek Pinder / Larikah Russell; Lilly Cal Fong / Yimara Figueroa	6; 3	6; 3

== See also ==
- Fed Cup structure
