= 2000 Fed Cup Americas Zone Group I – Pool B =

International tennis competition

Group B of the 2000 Fed Cup Americas Zone Group I was one of two pools in the Americas Zone Group I of the 2000 Fed Cup. Five teams competed in a round robin competition, with the top team advancing to the Group I play-off, the winner of which would advance to 2001 World Group play-offs, and the bottom team being relegated down to 2001 Group II.

	(Argentina) ARG	(Colombia) COL	(Mexico) MEX	(Paraguay) PAR	(Cuba) CUB	RR; W–L	Set; W–L	Game; W–L	Standings
Argentina		3–0	3–0	3–0	3–0	4–0	24–1	153–69	1
Colombia	0–3		2–1	3–0	3–0	3–1	18–10	150–105	2
Mexico	0–3	1–2		3–0	3–0	2–2	14–12	120–117	3
Paraguay	0–3	0–3	0–3		2–1	1–3	6–21	87–153	4
Cuba	0–3	0–3	0–3	1–2		0–4	4–22	82–148	5

== Argentina vs. Mexico ==
Argentina
3
Santinho Coast, Florianópolis, Brazil
25 April 2000
Red clay (outdoors)

Mexico
0

			1	2	3
1	(Argentina) (Mexico)	María Emilia Salerni; Melody Falcó	6; 1	6; 4
2	(Argentina) (Mexico)	Florencia Labat; Jessica Fernández	6; 3	6; 2
3	(Argentina) (Mexico)	Gisela Dulko / Laura Montalvo; Melody Falcó / Jessica Fernández	6; 3	7^{7} 6^{2}

== Paraguay vs. Cuba ==
Paraguay
2
Santinho Coast, Florianópolis, Brazil
25 April 2000
Red clay (outdoors)

Cuba
1

			1	2	3
1	(Paraguay) (Cuba)	María Alejandra García; Yanet Núñez Mojarena	5; 7	1; 6
2	(Paraguay) (Cuba)	Larissa Schaerer; Yoannis Montesino	6; 3	6; 1
3	(Paraguay) (Cuba)	María Alejandra García / Larissa Schaerer; Yamile Fors Guerra / Yoannis Montesino	1; 6	6; 2	10; 8

== Argentina vs. Paraguay ==
Argentina
3
Santinho Coast, Florianópolis, Brazil
26 April 2000
Red clay (outdoors)

Paraguay
0

			1	2	3
1	(Argentina) (Paraguay)	María Emilia Salerni; Sarah Tami Masi	6; 0	6; 3
2	(Argentina) (Paraguay)	Florencia Labat; Larissa Schaerer	6; 2	6; 2
3	(Argentina) (Paraguay)	Florencia Labat / Laura Montalvo; María Alejandra García / Sarah Tami Masi	6; 1	6; 0

== Colombia vs. Mexico ==
Colombia
2
Santinho Coast, Florianópolis, Brazil
26 April 2000
Red clay (outdoors)

Mexico
1

			1	2	3
1	(Colombia) (Mexico)	Catalina Castaño; Melody Falcó	2; 6	6; 0	2; 6
2	(Colombia) (Mexico)	Fabiola Zuluaga; Jessica Fernández	6; 3	6; 1
3	(Colombia) (Mexico)	Mariana Mesa / Fabiola Zuluaga; Melody Falcó / Jessica Fernández	7; 5	6; 1

== Colombia vs. Cuba ==
Colombia
3
Santinho Coast, Florianópolis, Brazil
27 April 2000
Red clay (outdoors)

Cuba
0

			1	2	3
1	(Colombia) (Cuba)	Catalina Castaño; Yamile Fors Guerra	6; 4	6; 1
2	(Colombia) (Cuba)	Fabiola Zuluaga; Yanet Núñez Mojarena	6; 4	6; 2
3	(Colombia) (Cuba)	Mariana Mesa / Fabiola Zuluaga; Yamile Fors Guerra / Yoannis Montesino	6; 2	6; 1

== Mexico vs. Paraguay ==
Mexico
3
Santinho Coast, Florianópolis, Brazil
27 April 2000
Red clay (outdoors)

Paraguay
0

			1	2	3
1	(Mexico) (Paraguay)	Melody Falcó; Sarah Tami Masi	6; 1	6; 1
2	(Mexico) (Paraguay)	Jessica Fernández; Larissa Schaerer	7; 5	7^{7} 6^{5}
3	(Mexico) (Paraguay)	Melody Falcó / Erika Valdés; María Alejandra García / Carolina Ojeda	6; 2	6; 4

== Argentina vs. Cuba ==
Argentina
3
Santinho Coast, Florianópolis, Brazil
28 April 2000
Red clay (outdoors)

Cuba
0

			1	2	3
1	(Argentina) (Cuba)	María Emilia Salerni; Yanet Núñez Mojarena	6; 3	6; 2
2	(Argentina) (Cuba)	Florencia Labat; Yoannis Montesino	6; 2	6; 0
3	(Argentina) (Cuba)	Gisela Dulko / Laura Montalvo; Yamile Fors Guerra / Yanet Núñez Mojarena	6; 1	6; 1

== Colombia vs. Paraguay ==
Colombia
3
Santinho Coast, Florianópolis, Brazil
28 April 2000
Red clay (outdoors)

Paraguay
0

			1	2	3
1	(Colombia) (Paraguay)	Catalina Castaño; María Alejandra García	6; 3	6; 0
2	(Colombia) (Paraguay)	Fabiola Zuluaga; Larissa Schaerer	6; 2	4; 6	6; 1
3	(Colombia) (Paraguay)	Romy Farah / Mariana Mesa; María Alejandra García / Sarah Tami Masi	6; 4	6^{6} 7^{8}	6; 2

== Argentina vs. Colombia ==
Argentina
3
Santinho Coast, Florianópolis, Brazil
29 April 2000
Red clay (outdoors)

Colombia
0

			1	2	3
1	(Argentina) (Colombia)	María Emilia Salerni; Catalina Castaño	6; 4	6; 2
2	(Argentina) (Colombia)	Florencia Labat; Fabiola Zuluaga	7; 5	1; 6	12; 10
3	(Argentina) (Colombia)	Gisela Dulko / Laura Montalvo; Romy Farah / Mariana Mesa	6; 3	6; 3

== Mexico vs. Cuba ==
Mexico
3
Santinho Coast, Florianópolis, Brazil
29 April 2000
Red clay (outdoors)

Cuba
0

			1	2	3
1	(Mexico) (Cuba)	Melody Falcó; Yanet Núñez Mojarena	6; 4	6; 3
2	(Mexico) (Cuba)	Jessica Fernández; Yoannis Montesino	7; 5	6; 4
3	(Mexico) (Cuba)	Jessica Fernández / Erika Valdés; Yamile Fors Guerra / Yanet Núñez Mojarena	6; 3	4; 6	6; 1

- Cuba failed to win any ties in the pool, and thus was relegated to Group II in 2001, where they placed third overall.

== See also ==
- Fed Cup structure
