= 2000 Fed Cup Americas Zone Group II – Pool A =

Group A of the 2000 Fed Cup Americas Zone Group II was one of four pools in the Americas Zone Group II of the 2000 Fed Cup. Three teams competed in a round robin competition, with each team being assigned to its respective play-off region.

	(Dominican Republic) DOM	(Trinidad and Tobago) TRI	(Barbados) BAR	RR; W–L	Set; W–L	Game; W–L	Standings
Dominican Republic		2–1	3–0	2–0	10–2	66–28	1
Trinidad and Tobago	1–2		2–1	1–1	7–6	63–52	2
Barbados	0–3	1–2		0–2	2–11	30–79	3

== Trinidad and Tobago vs. Barbados ==
Trinidad and Tobago
2
Maya C.C., La Libertad, El Salvador
9 May 2000
Red clay (outdoors)

Barbados
1

			1	2	3
1	(Trinidad and Tobago) (Barbados)	Sheenagh Cosgrove; Ariana Marshall	6^{5} 7^{7}	7; 5	6; 8
2	(Trinidad and Tobago) (Barbados)	Anneliese Rose; Elena Branker	6; 0	6; 0
3	(Trinidad and Tobago) (Barbados)	Cindra Maharaj / Anneliese Rose; Elena Branker / Ariana Marshall	6; 1	6; 1

== Dominican Republic vs. Trinidad and Tobago ==
Dominican Republic
2
Maya C.C., La Libertad, El Salvador
10 May 2000
Red clay (outdoors)

Trinidad and Tobago
1

			1	2	3
1	(Dominican Republic) (Trinidad and Tobago)	Glenny Cepeda; Sheenagh Cosgrove	6; 3	6; 2
2	(Dominican Republic) (Trinidad and Tobago)	Joelle Schad; Anneliese Rose	2; 6	4; 6
3	(Dominican Republic) (Trinidad and Tobago)	Glenny Cepeda / Joelle Schad; Cindra Maharaj / Anneliese Rose	6; 0	6; 3

== Dominican Republic vs. Barbados ==
Dominican Republic
3
Maya C.C., La Libertad, El Salvador
11 May 2000
Red clay (outdoors)

Barbados
0

			1	2	3
1	(Dominican Republic) (Barbados)	Carla Prieto; Ariana Marshall	6; 1	6; 1
2	(Dominican Republic) (Barbados)	Joelle Schad; Elena Branker	6; 1	6; 0
3	(Dominican Republic) (Barbados)	Daysi Espinal / Carla Prieto; Elena Branker / Ariana Marshall	6; 3	6; 2

== See also ==
- Fed Cup structure
