= Ana Osorio =

Salvadoran tennis player (born 1987)

- Full name: Ana Gloria Osorio Peña
- Country (sports): El Salvador
- Born: 12 April 1987 (age 38) San Salvador, El Salvador
- Prize money: US$ 2,100

Singles
- Career record: 6–9
- Highest ranking: No. 991 (1 Nov 2004)

Doubles
- Career record: 9–10
- Highest ranking: No. 779 (28 Oct 2002)
Medal record
Central American and Caribbean Games
Bronze medal – third place	2002 San Salvador	Women's Doubles
Bronze medal – third place	2002 San Salvador	Women's Team

Ana Gloria Osorio Peña (born 12 April 1987) is a Salvadoran former professional tennis player.

Osório, who attained the number one ranking in her country, represented El Salvador in seven Fed Cup ties across 2001 and 2002. She featured only as a doubles player, winning six of her seven rubbers. In 2002 she helped El Salvador gain promotion to the American Zone Group I for the first time.

At the 2002 Central American and Caribbean Games she won two medals for El Salvador, in front of a home crowd in San Salvador. She was a bronze medalist partnering Liz Cruz in the women's doubles and won a further bronze medal in the team event, with Cruz and Marcela Rodezno.

== ITF finals ==
=== Doubles: 1 (0–1) ===
Outcome	No.	Date	Tournament	Surface	Partner	Opponents	Score
Runner-up	1.	16 September 2002	Santo Domingo, Dominican Republic	Clay	(El Salvador) Liz Cruz	(Ecuador) Emma Zuleta (Ecuador) Hilda Zuleta Cabrera	4–6, 4–6
