= 2000 Fed Cup Americas Zone Group I – Pool A =

Group A of the 2000 Fed Cup Americas Zone Group I was one of two pools in the Americas Zone Group I of the 2000 Fed Cup. Five teams competed in a round robin competition, with the top team advancing to the Group I play-off, the winner of which would advance to 2001 World Group play-offs, and the bottom team being relegated down to 2001 Group II.

	(Canada) CAN	(Venezuela) VEN	(Brazil) BRA	(Uruguay) URU	(Chile) CHI	RR; W–L	Set; W–L	Game; W–L	Standings
Canada		2–1	3–0	3–0	3–0	4–0	21–5	155–85	1
Venezuela	1–2		2–1	3–0	3–0	3–1	19–11	158–116	2
Brazil	0–3	1–2		2–1	3–0	2–2	14–13	132–130	3
Uruguay	0–3	0–3	1–2		3–0	1–3	10–16	96–127	4
Chile	0–3	0–3	0–3	0–3		0–4	2–22	61–144	5

== Canada vs. Chile ==
Canada
3
Santinho Coast, Florianópolis, Brazil
25 April 2000
Red clay (outdoors)

Chile
0

			1	2	3
1	(Canada) (Chile)	Jana Nejedly; Bárbara Castro	6; 1	6; 3
2	(Canada) (Chile)	Maureen Drake; Valentina Castro	6; 0	6; 1
3	(Canada) (Chile)	Sonya Jeyaseelan / Vanessa Webb; Carolina Aravena / Valentina Castro	6; 1	6; 2

== Venezuela vs. Uruguay ==
Venezuela
3
Santinho Coast, Florianópolis, Brazil
25 April 2000
Red clay (outdoors)

Uruguay
0

			1	2	3
1	(Venezuela) (Uruguay)	Milagros Sequera; Cecilia Guillenea	4; 6	6; 1	6; 4
2	(Venezuela) (Uruguay)	María Vento; Daniela Olivera	1; 6	6; 3	6; 2
3	(Venezuela) (Uruguay)	Milagros Sequera / María Vento; Ana Lucía Migliarini de León / Virginia Sadi	6; 1	6; 1

== Venezuela vs. Brazil ==
Venezuela
2
Santinho Coast, Florianópolis, Brazil
26 April 2000
Red clay (outdoors)

Brazil
1

			1	2	3
1	(Venezuela) (Brazil)	Milagros Sequera; Miriam D'Agostini	7^{7} 6^{5}	6; 2
2	(Venezuela) (Brazil)	María Vento; Joana Cortez	7; 5	3; 6	6; 3
3	(Venezuela) (Brazil)	Milagros Sequera / María Vento; Miriam D'Agostini / Carla Tiene	4; 6	7; 5	4; 6

== Uruguay vs. Chile ==
Uruguay
3
Santinho Coast, Florianópolis, Brazil
26 April 2000
Red clay (outdoors)

Chile
0

			1	2	3
1	(Uruguay) (Chile)	Cecilia Guillenea; Bárbara Castro	7^{8} 6^{6}	6; 3
2	(Uruguay) (Chile)	Daniela Olivera; Valentina Castro	6; 2	6; 1
3	(Uruguay) (Chile)	Daniela Olivera / Virginia Sadi; Carolina Aravena / Valentina Castro	6; 3	6; 2

== Canada vs. Uruguay ==
Canada
3
Santinho Coast, Florianópolis, Brazil
27 April 2000
Red clay (outdoors)

Uruguay
0

			1	2	3
1	(Canada) (Uruguay)	Sonya Jeyaseelan; Cecilia Guillenea	6; 1	6; 2
2	(Canada) (Uruguay)	Maureen Drake; Daniela Olivera	7; 5	6; 2
3	(Canada) (Uruguay)	Maureen Drake / Sonya Jeyaseelan; Ana Lucía Migliarini de León / Virginia Sadi	6; 0	6; 2

== Brazil vs. Chile ==
Brazil
3
Santinho Coast, Florianópolis, Brazil
27 April 2000
Red clay (outdoors)

Chile
0

			1	2	3
1	(Brazil) (Chile)	Carla Tiene; Carolina Aravena	6; 4	4; 6	6; 3
2	(Brazil) (Chile)	Joana Cortez; Bárbara Castro	6; 2	6; 3
3	(Brazil) (Chile)	Joana Cortez / Miriam D'Agostini; Valentina Castro / Karem Harboe	6; 4	6; 2

== Canada vs. Brazil ==
Canada
3
Santinho Coast, Florianópolis, Brazil
28 April 2000
Red clay (outdoors)

Brazil
0

			1	2	3
1	(Canada) (Brazil)	Jana Nejedly; Miriam D'Agostini	7^{7} 6^{5}	6^{5} 7^{7}	3; 0	retired
2	(Canada) (Brazil)	Sonya Jeyaseelan; Joana Cortez	6; 0	6; 4
3	(Canada) (Brazil)	Maureen Drake / Sonya Jeyaseelan; Maria Fernanda Alves / Carla Tiene	6; 1	6; 3

== Venezuela vs. Chile ==
Venezuela
3
Santinho Coast, Florianópolis, Brazil
28 April 2000
Red clay (outdoors)

Chile
0

			1	2	3
1	(Venezuela) (Chile)	Milagros Sequera; Carolina Aravena	4; 6	6; 3	6; 0
2	(Venezuela) (Chile)	María Vento; Bárbara Castro	3; 0			retired
3	(Venezuela) (Chile)	Milagros Sequera / María Vento; Valentina Castro / Karem Harboe	6; 2	6; 1

== Canada vs. Venezuela ==
Canada
2
Santinho Coast, Florianópolis, Brazil
29 April 2000
Red clay (outdoors)

Venezuela
1

			1	2	3
1	(Canada) (Venezuela)	Jana Nejedly; Milagros Sequera	2; 6	7^{7} 6^{1}	6; 3
2	(Canada) (Venezuela)	Sonya Jeyaseelan; María Vento	3; 6	5; 7
3	(Canada) (Venezuela)	Maureen Drake / Sonya Jeyaseelan; Milagros Sequera / María Vento	6^{4} 7^{7}	6; 4	7; 5

== Brazil vs. Uruguay ==
Brazil
2
Santinho Coast, Florianópolis, Brazil
25 April 2000
Red clay (outdoors)

Uruguay
1

			1	2	3
1	(Brazil) (Uruguay)	Carla Tiene; Cecilia Guillenea	6; 3	6; 4
2	(Brazil) (Uruguay)	Joana Cortez; Daniela Olivera	4; 6	4; 6
3	(Brazil) (Uruguay)	Joana Cortez / Miriam D'Agostini; Daniela Olivera / Virginia Sadi	6; 2	6; 3

- Chile failed to win any ties in the pool, and thus was relegated to Group II in 2001, where they placed fifth overall.

== See also ==
- Fed Cup structure
