= 2003 Fed Cup Americas Zone Group II – Pool A =

Group A of the 2003 Fed Cup Americas Zone Group II was one of two pools in the Americas Zone Group II of the 2003 Fed Cup. Five teams competed in a round robin competition, with the top team advancing to Group I in 2004.

		(Venezuela) VEN	(Costa Rica) CRC	(Dominican Republic) DOM	(Puerto Rico) PUR	(Ecuador) ECU	RR; W–L	Set; W–L	Game; W–L	Standings
27	Venezuela		3–0	3–0	1–2	1–2	2–2	15–9	130–79	3
55	Costa Rica	0–3		0–3	0–3	0–3	0–4	3–24	73–157	5
58	Dominican Republic	0–3	3–0		0–3	1–2	1–3	8–17	80–134	4
62	Puerto Rico	2–1	3–0	3–0		3–0	4–0	22–1	136–22	1
82	Ecuador	2–1	3–0	2–1	0–3		3–1	14–11	113–110	2

== Costa Rica vs. Ecuador ==
Costa Rica
0
San Juan, Puerto Rico
23 April 2003
Hard (outdoors)

Ecuador
3

			1	2	3
1	(Costa Rica) (Ecuador)	Julia Roca Valverde; María Teresa Salame	3; 6	5; 7
2	(Costa Rica) (Ecuador)	Karla Golfin; Estefania Balda Álvarez	2; 6	2; 6
3	(Costa Rica) (Ecuador)	Karla Golfin / Julia Roca Valverde; Estefania Balda Álvarez / Pamela Durán Vinueza	3; 6	7^{7} 6^{5}	4; 6

== Dominican Republic vs. Puerto Rico ==
Dominican Republic
0
San Juan, Puerto Rico
23 April 2003
Hard (outdoors)

Puerto Rico
3

			1	2	3
1	(Dominican Republic) (Puerto Rico)	Natalia Báez; Vilmarie Castellvi	1; 6	0; 6
2	(Dominican Republic) (Puerto Rico)	Vanessa Masalles; Kristina Brandi	0; 6	0; 6
3	(Dominican Republic) (Puerto Rico)	Yadira Geara / Vanessa Masalles; Vilmarie Castellvi / Tania Rivera	1; 6	0; 6

== Puerto Rico vs. Ecuador ==
Puerto Rico
3
San Juan, Puerto Rico
24 April 2003
Hard (outdoors)

Ecuador
0

			1	2	3
1	(Puerto Rico) (Ecuador)	Vilmarie Castellvi; María Teresa Salame	6; 2	6; 1
2	(Puerto Rico) (Ecuador)	Kristina Brandi; Estefania Balda Álvarez	6; 0	6; 0
3	(Puerto Rico) (Ecuador)	Kristina Brandi / Vilmarie Castellvi; Estefania Balda Álvarez / María Teresa Salame	6; 1	6; 0

== Venezuela vs. Dominican Republic ==
Venezuela
3
San Juan, Puerto Rico
24 April 2003
Hard (outdoors)

Dominican Republic
0

			1	2	3
1	(Venezuela) (Dominican Republic)	Paola Iovino; Natalia Báez	6; 3	6; 0
2	(Venezuela) (Dominican Republic)	Avel-Romaly Coronado; Vanessa Masalles	6; 4	6; 2
3	(Venezuela) (Dominican Republic)	Stephanie Schaer / Claudia Strauss; Yadira Geara / Vanessa Masalles	6; 3	7; 5

== Venezuela vs. Costa Rica ==
Venezuela
3
San Juan, Puerto Rico
25 April 2003
Hard (outdoors)

Costa Rica
0

			1	2	3
1	(Venezuela) (Costa Rica)	Avel-Romaly Coronado; Julia Roca Valverde	6; 2	6; 3
2	(Venezuela) (Costa Rica)	Stephanie Schaer; Karla Golfin	6; 0	6; 3
3	(Venezuela) (Costa Rica)	Paola Iovino / Claudia Strauss; Karla Golfin / Julia Roca Valverde	6; 1	3; 6	6; 2

== Dominican Republic vs. Ecuador ==
Dominican Republic
1
San Juan, Puerto Rico
25 April 2003
Hard (outdoors)

Ecuador
2

			1	2	3
1	(Dominican Republic) (Ecuador)	Natalia Báez; María Teresa Salame	6; 3	7^{7} 6^{1}
2	(Dominican Republic) (Ecuador)	Vanessa Masalles; Estefania Balda Álvarez	1; 6	1; 6
3	(Dominican Republic) (Ecuador)	Natalia Báez / Vanessa Masalles; Estefania Balda Álvarez / Pamela Durán Vinueza	5; 7	2; 6

== Venezuela vs. Ecuador ==
Venezuela
1
San Juan, Puerto Rico
26 April 2003
Hard (outdoors)

Ecuador
2

			1	2	3
1	(Venezuela) (Ecuador)	Paola Iovino; María Teresa Salame	6; 3	7; 5
2	(Venezuela) (Ecuador)	Stephanie Schaer; Estefania Balda Álvarez	4; 6	3; 6
3	(Venezuela) (Ecuador)	Paola Iovino / Stephanie Schaer; Pamela Durán Vinueza / María Teresa Salame	2; 6	4; 6

== Costa Rica vs. Puerto Rico ==
Costa Rica
0
San Juan, Puerto Rico
26 April 2003
Hard (outdoors)

Puerto Rico
3

			1	2	3
1	(Costa Rica) (Puerto Rico)	Andrea Brenes; Vilmarie Castellvi	0; 6	1; 6
2	(Costa Rica) (Puerto Rico)	Julia Roca Valverde; Kristina Brandi	0; 6	0; 6
3	(Costa Rica) (Puerto Rico)	Andrea Brenes / Karla Golfin; María Calbetó / Vilmarie Castellvi	2; 6	0; 6

== Venezuela vs. Puerto Rico ==
Venezuela
1
San Juan, Puerto Rico
27 April 2003
Hard (outdoors)

Puerto Rico
2

			1	2	3
1	(Venezuela) (Puerto Rico)	Avel-Romaly Coronado; Vilmarie Castellvi	2; 6	0; 6
2	(Venezuela) (Puerto Rico)	Stephanie Schaer; Kristina Brandi				w/o
3	(Venezuela) (Puerto Rico)	Stephanie Schaer / Claudia Strauss; María Calbetó / Vilmarie Castellvi	1; 6	6; 4	4; 6

== Costa Rica vs. Dominican Republic ==
Costa Rica
0
San Juan, Puerto Rico
27 April 2003
Hard (outdoors)

Dominican Republic
3

			1	2	3
1	(Costa Rica) (Dominican Republic)	Andrea Brenes; Natalia Báez	6; 2	3; 6	3; 6
2	(Costa Rica) (Dominican Republic)	Julia Roca Valverde; Vanessa Masalles	4; 6	2; 6
3	(Costa Rica) (Dominican Republic)	Andrea Brenes / Julia Roca Valverde; Natalia Báez / Vanessa Masalles	6^{4} 7^{7}	3; 6

- Puerto Rico placed first in the pool, and thus advanced to Group I in 2004, where they placed equal sixth out of the overall nine.

== See also ==
- Fed Cup structure
