= 2003 Fed Cup Americas Zone Group I – Pool A =

Group A of the 2003 Fed Cup Americas Zone Group I was one of two pools in the Americas Zone Group I of the 2003 Fed Cup. Four teams competed in a round robin competition, with the top teams coming first and second advancing to the play-offs, and the bottom team being relegated down to 2004 Group II.

		(Canada) CAN	(Mexico) MEX	(Uruguay) URU	(The Bahamas) BAH	RR; W–L	Set; W–L	Game; W–L	Standings
18	Canada		3–0	3–0	3–0	3–0	18–1	114–39	1
28	Mexico	0–3		2–1	3–0	2–1	11–10	97–91	2
34	Uruguay	0–3	1–2		3–0	1–2	9–11	89–93	3
54	Bahamas	0–3	0–3	0–3		0–3	2–18	35–112	4

== Canada vs. Bahamas ==
Canada
3
Campinas, Brazil
23 April 2003
Red clay (outdoors)

Bahamas
0

			1	2	3
1	(Canada) (The Bahamas)	Jana Nejedly; Jessica Sweeting	6; 0	6; 1
2	(Canada) (The Bahamas)	Maureen Drake; Nikkita Fountain	6; 0	6; 1
3	(Canada) (The Bahamas)	Jana Nejedly / Marie-Ève Pelletier; Nikkita Fountain / Jessica Sweeting	6; 0	6; 1

== Mexico vs. Uruguay ==
Mexico
2
Campinas, Brazil
23 April 2003
Red clay (outdoors)

Uruguay
1

			1	2	3
1	(Mexico) (Uruguay)	Jessica Fernández; Estefanía Craciun	6; 2	6; 1
2	(Mexico) (Uruguay)	Melissa Torres Sandoval; Ana Lucía Migliarini de León	6^{6} 7^{8}	7; 5	6; 8
3	(Mexico) (Uruguay)	Jessica Fernández / Melissa Torres Sandoval; Estefanía Craciun / Ana Lucía Migliarini de León	6; 4	6; 4

== Canada vs. Uruguay ==
Canada
3
Campinas, Brazil
24 April 2003
Red clay (outdoors)

Uruguay
0

			1	2	3
1	(Canada) (Uruguay)	Jana Nejedly; Estefanía Craciun	6; 3	6; 1
2	(Canada) (Uruguay)	Maureen Drake; Ana Lucía Migliarini de León	6; 2	6; 2
3	(Canada) (Uruguay)	Marie-Ève Pelletier / Vanessa Webb; Estefanía Craciun / Fabiana Gómez	6; 4	6^{3} 7^{7}	6; 3

== Mexico vs. Bahamas ==
Mexico
3
Campinas, Brazil
24 April 2003
Red clay (outdoors)

Bahamas
0

			1	2	3
1	(Mexico) (The Bahamas)	Karin Palme; Jessica Sweeting	6; 4	2; 6	6; 1
2	(Mexico) (The Bahamas)	Jessica Fernández; Nikkita Fountain	6; 0	6; 2
3	(Mexico) (The Bahamas)	Daniela Múñoz Gallegos / Karin Palme; Nikkita Fountain / Jessica Sweeting	6; 1	2; 6	6; 4

== Canada vs. Mexico ==
Canada
3
Campinas, Brazil
25 April 2003
Red clay (outdoors)

Mexico
0

			1	2	3
1	(Canada) (Mexico)	Jana Nejedly; Jessica Fernández	6; 2	6; 2
2	(Canada) (Mexico)	Maureen Drake; Melissa Torres Sandoval	6; 2	6; 4
3	(Canada) (Mexico)	Marie-Ève Pelletier / Vanessa Webb; Daniela Múñoz Gallegos / Karin Palme	6; 1	6; 3

== Uruguay vs. Bahamas ==
Uruguay
3
Campinas, Brazil
25 April 2003
Red clay (outdoors)

Bahamas
0

			1	2	3
1	(Uruguay) (The Bahamas)	Estefanía Craciun; Jessica Sweeting	6; 3	6; 3
2	(Uruguay) (The Bahamas)	Ana Lucía Migliarini de León; Nikkita Fountain	6; 1	6; 1
3	(Uruguay) (The Bahamas)	Fabiana Gómez / Ana Lucía Migliarini de León; Keva Palmer / Jessica Sweeting	6; 0	6; 0

- Bahamas failed to win any ties in the pool, and thus was relegated to Group II in 2004. However, they did not partake next year.

== See also ==
- Fed Cup structure
