= 2002 Fed Cup Americas Zone Group I – play-offs =

International tennis competition play-offs

The play-offs of the 2002 Fed Cup Americas Zone Group I were the final stages of the Group I Zonal Competition involving teams from the Americas. Those that qualified for this stage placed first and second in their respective pools.

Placing	Pool A	Pool B
1	Canada	Colombia
2	Mexico	Uruguay
3	Bahamas	Paraguay
4	Puerto Rico	Brazil
5		Venezuela

The four teams were then paired up the team from a different placing of the other group for a play-off tie, with the winners being promoted to the World Group play-offs.

== Canada vs. Uruguay ==
Canada
2
San Luis Potosí, Mexico
27 April 2002
Hard (outdoors)

Uruguay
0

			1	2	3
1	(Canada) (Uruguay)	Maureen Drake; Ana Lucía Migliarini de León	6; 2	6; 2
2	(Canada) (Uruguay)	Jana Nejedly; Daniela Olivera	6; 4	5; 7	11; 9
3	(Canada) (Uruguay)					not played

- Canada advanced to the World Group play-offs, where they were drawn against Czech Republic. They lost 0–5, and thus were relegated back to Group I for 2003.

== Mexico vs. Colombia ==
Mexico
0
San Luis Potosí, Mexico
27 April 2002
Hard (outdoors)

Colombia
2

			1	2	3
1	(Mexico) (Colombia)	Melissa Torres Sandoval; Catalina Castaño	6; 4	3; 6	1; 6
2	(Mexico) (Colombia)	Jessica Fernández; Fabiola Zuluaga	1; 6	0; 6
3	(Mexico) (Colombia)					not played

- Colombia advanced to the World Group play-offs, where they were drawn against Japan. However, the Japanese withdrew from their tie citing security concerns over the Colombian armed conflict. Colombia thus advanced automatically to the World Group.

== See also ==
- Fed Cup structure
