= Mariela Salinas =

Venezuelan tennis player (born 1980)

- Country (sports): Venezuela
- Born: 12 February 1980 (age 45)

Singles
- Career record: 22–26
- Highest ranking: No. 653 (21 Oct 2002)

Doubles
- Career record: 12–18
- Career titles: 1 ITF
- Highest ranking: No. 472 (30 Nov 1998)
Medal record
Central American and Caribbean Games
Bronze medal – third place	2002 San Salvador	Women's Doubles

Mariela Salinas (born 12 February 1980) is a Venezuelan former professional tennis player.

Salinas made her debut for the Venezuela Fed Cup team as a 17-year old in 1997, appearing in three ties. Her highlight was a singles win over Peru's Silvana Vargas. She didn't feature again in the Fed Cup until 2002, when she played in four further ties for Venezuela.

At the 2002 Central American and Caribbean Games in San Salvador, Salinas partnered with Stephanie Schaer to win a bronze medal in the women's doubles competition.

== ITF finals ==
=== Singles: 2 (0–2) ===
Outcome	No.	Date	Tournament	Surface	Opponent	Score
Runner-up	1.	21 July 2002	Valencia, Venezuela	Hard	(United States) Jacquelyn Rosen	2–6, 1–4 RET
Runner-up	2.	25 August 2002	San Luis Potosí, Mexico	Hard	(Russia) Anastasia Dvornikova	3–6, 5–7

=== Doubles: 1 (1–0) ===
Outcome	No.	Date	Tournament	Surface	Partner	Opponents	Score
Winner	1.	17 May 1998	Caracas, Venezuela	Hard	(United States) Sylvia Schenck	(United States) Lesley Kramer (United States) Kylene Wong Simunyola	6–4, 2–6, 6–3
