= El Palmarcito =

Coordinates: 13.4942°N 89.4143°W

El Palmarcito is a small coastal town on the Pacific coast of El Salvador.

The town's main road is cobblestone.

The climate is similar to that found all along El Salvador's coast, tending towards warm days and cool nights.
