= 2003 Fed Cup Americas Zone Group II – Pool B =

Group B of the 2003 Fed Cup Americas Zone Group II was one of two pools in the Americas Zone Group II of the 2003 Fed Cup. Five teams competed in a round robin competition, with the top team advancing to Group I in 2004.

		(Bolivia) BOL	(Jamaica) JAM	(Chile) CHI	(Trinidad and Tobago) TRI	(Bermuda) BER	RR; W–L	Set; W–L	Game; W–L	Standings
44	Bolivia		0–3	0–3	3–0	2–1	2–2	18–7	122–62	3
65	Jamaica	3–0		1–2	3–0	3–0	3–1	14–10	130–101	2
69	Chile	3–0	2–1		3–0	3–0	4–0	20–3	129–56	1
71	Trinidad and Tobago	0–3	0–3	0–3		0–3	0–4	2–24	64–148	5
77	Bermuda	1–2	0–3	0–3	3–0		1–3	9–20	84–140	4

== Bolivia vs. Trinidad and Tobago ==
Bolivia
3
San Juan, Puerto Rico
23 April 2003
Hard (outdoors)

Trinidad and Tobago
0

			1	2	3
1	(Bolivia) (Trinidad and Tobago)	María Irene Squillaci Sandoval; Danielle Cosgrove	6; 0	6; 2
2	(Bolivia) (Trinidad and Tobago)	María Fernanda Álvarez Terán; Lisa Fung-Kee-Fung	6; 1	6; 4
3	(Bolivia) (Trinidad and Tobago)	María Fernanda Álvarez Terán / Mónica Poveda; Danielle Cosgrove / Lisa Fung-Kee-Fung	6; 0	6; 3

== Jamaica vs. Bermuda ==
Jamaica
3
San Juan, Puerto Rico
23 April 2003
Hard (outdoors)

Bermuda
0

			1	2	3
1	(Jamaica) (Bermuda)	Megan Moulton-Levy; Ashley Brooks	6; 2	6; 1
2	(Jamaica) (Bermuda)	Alanna Broderick; Zarah De Silva	6; 1	6; 2
3	(Jamaica) (Bermuda)	Alanna Broderick / Kadija Richards; Kara Fisher / Sasha Fisher	6; 1	6; 2

== Bolivia vs. Jamaica ==
Bolivia
0
San Juan, Puerto Rico
24 April 2003
Hard (outdoors)

Jamaica
3

			1	2	3
1	(Bolivia) (Jamaica)	María Fernanda Álvarez Terán; Megan Moulton-Levy	2; 6	1; 6
2	(Bolivia) (Jamaica)	Mónica Poveda; Alanna Broderick	2; 6	3; 6
3	(Bolivia) (Jamaica)	María Fernanda Álvarez Terán / Mónica Poveda; Alanna Broderick / Megan Moulton-Levy	2; 6	5; 7

== Chile vs. Bermuda ==
Chile
3
San Juan, Puerto Rico
24 April 2003
Hard (outdoors)

Bermuda
0

			1	2	3
1	(Chile) (Bermuda)	Valentina Castro; Sasha Fisher	6; 1	6; 1
2	(Chile) (Bermuda)	Andrea Koch-Benvenuto; Zarah De Silva	6; 3	6; 3
3	(Chile) (Bermuda)	Valentina Castro / Andrea Koch-Benvenuto; Ashley Brooks / Sasha Fisher	6; 2	6; 1

== Bolivia vs. Bermuda ==
Bolivia
2
San Juan, Puerto Rico
25 April 2003
Hard (outdoors)

Bermuda
1

			1	2	3
1	(Bolivia) (Bermuda)	María Irene Squillaci Sandoval; Ashley Brooks	6; 3	4; 6	3; 6
2	(Bolivia) (Bermuda)	María Fernanda Álvarez Terán; Zarah De Silva	0; 6	6; 0	6; 0
3	(Bolivia) (Bermuda)	María Fernanda Álvarez Terán / Mónica Poveda; Ashley Brooks / Zarah De Silva	6; 1	6; 2

== Chile vs. Trinidad and Tobago ==
Chile
3
San Juan, Puerto Rico
25 April 2003
Hard (outdoors)

Trinidad and Tobago
0

			1	2	3
1	(Chile) (Trinidad and Tobago)	Valentina Castro; Danielle Cosgrove	6; 0	6; 0
2	(Chile) (Trinidad and Tobago)	Andrea Koch-Benvenuto; Lisa Fung-Kee-Fung	6; 4	6; 4
3	(Chile) (Trinidad and Tobago)	Andrea Koch-Benvenuto / Mabel Rodríguez; Danielle Cosgrove / Lisa Fung-Kee-Fung	6; 2	6; 2

== Bolivia vs. Chile ==
Bolivia
0
San Juan, Puerto Rico
26 April 2003
Hard (outdoors)

Chile
3

			1	2	3
1	(Bolivia) (Chile)	María Fernanda Álvarez Terán; Valentina Castro	2; 6	0; 6
2	(Bolivia) (Chile)	Mónica Poveda; Andrea Koch-Benvenuto	2; 6	2; 6
3	(Bolivia) (Chile)	María Fernanda Álvarez Terán / Mónica Poveda; Valentina Castro / Mabel Rodríguez	6; 4			retired

== Jamaica vs. Trinidad and Tobago ==
Jamaica
3
San Juan, Puerto Rico
26 April 2003
Hard (outdoors)

Trinidad and Tobago
0

			1	2	3
1	(Jamaica) (Trinidad and Tobago)	Kadija Richards; Danielle Cosgrove	6; 1	6; 2
2	(Jamaica) (Trinidad and Tobago)	Megan Moulton-Levy; Lisa Fung-Kee-Fung	6; 2	6; 1
3	(Jamaica) (Trinidad and Tobago)	Kadija Richards / Tinesta Rowe; Danielle Cosgrove / Lisa Fung-Kee-Fung	6; 4	6; 1

== Jamaica vs. Chile ==
Jamaica
1
San Juan, Puerto Rico
27 April 2003
Hard (outdoors)

Chile
2

			1	2	3
1	(Jamaica) (Chile)	Megan Moulton-Levy; Valentina Castro	3; 6	4; 6
2	(Jamaica) (Chile)	Alanna Broderick; Andrea Koch-Benvenuto	2; 6	0; 6
3	(Jamaica) (Chile)	Alanna Broderick / Megan Moulton-Levy; Valentina Castro / Mabel Rodríguez	6; 1	6; 4

== Trinidad and Tobago vs. Bermuda ==
Trinidad and Tobago
0
San Juan, Puerto Rico
27 April 2003
Hard (outdoors)

Bermuda
3

			1	2	3
1	(Trinidad and Tobago) (Bermuda)	Danielle Cosgrove; Ashley Brooks	2; 6	4; 6
2	(Trinidad and Tobago) (Bermuda)	Lisa Fung-Kee-Fung; Zarah De Silva	6; 0	3; 6	4; 6
3	(Trinidad and Tobago) (Bermuda)	Danielle Cosgrove / Lisa Fung-Kee-Fung; Ashley Brooks / Sasha Fisher	2; 6	6; 4	4; 6

- Chile placed first in the pool, and thus advanced to Group I in 2004, where they were faced relegation down to Group II for 2005.

== See also ==
- Fed Cup structure
