= Jhonnatan Medina-Álvarez =

Venezuelan tennis player (born 1982)

- Country (sports): Venezuela
- Born: 12 January 1982 (age 44)
- Plays: Left-handed
- Prize money: $41,792

Singles
- Career record: 8–9 (Davis Cup)
- Highest ranking: No. 370 (19 March 2007)

Doubles
- Highest ranking: No. 458 (15 September 2003)
Medal record
Central American and Caribbean Games
Bronze medal – third place	2002 San Salvador	Mixed Doubles
Bronze medal – third place	2002 San Salvador	Men's Team

Jhonnatan Medina-Álvarez (born 12 January 1982) is a Venezuelan former professional tennis player, and current pickleball player.

== Career ==
A left-handed player from Caracas, Medina competed mostly in ITF Futures events, with the occasional appearance on the ATP Challenger Tour. He featured in the qualifying draw for an ATP Tour tournament in Delray Beach in 2005. His career high singles ranking of 370 in the world was attained in 2007.

Between 2001 and 2009, Medina appeared in 13 Davis Cup ties, from which he won eight singles rubbers.

Medina, the winner of two bronze medals at the 2002 Central American and Caribbean Games, also represented Venezuela at both the 2003 Pan American Games and 2007 Pan American Games.

Based in the United States since 2007, Medina became an American citizen in 2016 and is currently the Director of Tennis at Longwood University.
