= Kepler Orellana =

Venezuelan tennis player (born 1977)

- Country (sports): Venezuela
- Residence: Barquisimeto, Venezuela
- Born: 8 October 1977 (age 48) Barquisimeto, Venezuela
- Plays: Right-handed
- Prize money: US$65,350

Singles
- Career record: 3–5
- Highest ranking: No. 304 (7 June 1999)

Doubles
- Career record: 2–2
- Highest ranking: No. 256 (14 June 1999)
Medal record
Central American and Caribbean Games
Silver medal – second place	2002 San Salvador	Men's Singles
Bronze medal – third place	2002 San Salvador	Men's Doubles
Bronze medal – third place	2002 San Salvador	Men's Team

Kepler Orellana (born 8 October 1977) is a male former professional tennis player from Venezuela.

== Career ==
Orellana reached his highest individual ranking on the ATP Tour on June 7, 1999, when he became World number 304. He primarily played on the Futures circuit and the Challenger circuit.

Orellana was a member of the Venezuelan Davis Cup team, having posted a 6–6 record in singles and a 5–2 record in doubles in nine ties played from 1998 to 2004.

Orellana represented Venezuela at the 2002 Central American and Caribbean Games in San Salvador, El Salvador, winning the silver medal in the men's singles event while taking the bronze medal in both the men's doubles and men's team events. Orellana also represented Venezuela at the 2003 Pan American Games in Santo Domingo, Dominican Republic, reaching the third round in the men's singles event and reaching the quarterfinals in the men's doubles event.

== ATP Challenger & ITF Futures ==
=== Singles Titles (6) ===
Legend
ATP Challenger Series
ITF Futures Series (6)

No.	Date	Tournament	Surface	Opponent	Score
1.	23 November 1998	Tucson	Hard	(Germany) Alexander Popp	6–3, 4–6, 6–0
2.	12 November 2001	Curaçao	Hard	(Spain) Antonio Baldellou-Esteva	6–3, 6–2
3.	8 April 2002	Kingston	Hard	(Switzerland) Roman Valent	6–2, 6–4
4.	13 May 2002	Montego Bay	Hard	(Australia) Luke Smith	7–5, 4–6, 7–5
5.	8 September 2003	Montego Bay	Hard	(Sweden) Jacob Adaktusson	6–3, 6–4
6.	20 October 2003	Montego Bay	Hard	(Argentina) Luciano Vitullo	6–3, 6–1
