= Claudia Strauss =

American anthropologist

- Occupations: Cultural anthropologist, academic, and author
- Spouse: James Van Cleve

Academic background
- Education: A.B. A.M. Ph.D.
- Alma mater: Brown University; Harvard University
- Website: https://www.claudiastrauss.org

Claudia Strauss is an American cultural anthropologist, academic, and author. She is Jean M. Pitzer Professor of Anthropology at Pitzer College.

Strauss' work has focused on psychological anthropology, social and culture theory, American political culture, and discourse analysis. Her work spans articles and books, including Human Motives and Cultural Models, A Cognitive Theory of Cultural Meaning, and What Work Means: Beyond the Puritan Work Ethic.

Strauss was the president of the Society for Psychological Anthropology from 2011 to 2013, and received the Lifetime Achievement Award from the Society for Psychological Anthropology in 2025.

== Education and career ==
Strauss completed her A.B. from Brown University in 1976. She subsequently completed her A.M. and Ph.D. in Social Anthropology from Harvard University, in 1979 and 1988, respectively. She began her career as an assistant professor of Anthropology at Duke University from 1990 to 1997. She joined Pitzer College as assistant professor in 2000, becoming associate professor in 2002 and professor in 2007. In 2024, she was appointed as Jean M. Pitzer Professor of Anthropology.

Strauss spent a semester at the Russell Sage Foundation, writing a book on Americans' cultural values and social justice titled Making Sense of Public Opinion: American Discourses about Immigration and Social Programs.

== Works ==
In 1992, Strauss co-edited a book with Roy D'Andrade, Human Motives and Cultural Models, which explored how culture, desire, and knowledge shape human motivation. Academic reviewers called the book a significant contribution but questioned how successful it is in keeping cultural analysis central in the book. Carl Ratner believed the book downplays the influence of culture on psychological processes and focuses too much on personal autonomy. On the other hand, Geoffrey White viewed the book as a forward-thinking effort. David Lipset and Sam Migliore, in separate reviews, noted that the book is "intellectually stimulating" and "cohesive and well-integrated" but is ethnographically narrow in that it has only one chapter that deals with non-American material.

Strauss and Naomi Quinn co-authored the book A Cognitive Theory of Cultural Meaning, in which they presented a new theory of cultural meaning. They drew on connectionist neural network models in the cognitive sciences to show the way dynamic, context-specific meanings can emerge from internalized learning. The book was praised for its core idea. Bradd Shore commended the authors for rejecting culture as text in favor of mental models. Joseph Grady and Axel Aubrun called the book a "refreshing departure" from narrow definitions of culture. However, the book was criticized for relying mostly on American case studies. Reviewers also commented that while the connectionist model is "promising", it may be prematurely applied to complex cultural phenomena.

Strauss authored Making Sense of Public Opinion: American Discourses about Immigration and Social Programs, for which she conducted interviews to demonstrate how diverse discourses on immigration and social welfare shape political culture. The book was praised for her use of cultural models and discourse analysis. Reviewers also praised Strauss' methodology and data collection, but Liam Stanley added that her "rigorous methodology...has some downsides. It gives the empirical parts of the book a catalogue-like feel, with little attempt to embed the discussion within wider analytical narratives."

Strauss co-edited a book with Jack Friedman Political Sentiments and Social Movements: The Person in Politics and Culture, which explored how ordinary people constructed political meanings, formed identities, and engaged with political movements. Her 2024 book What Work Means: Beyond the Puritan Work Ethic examined how Americans viewed work as part of a fulfilling life. Gretchen Gavett, in the Harvard Business Review, said, "the way Strauss frames 'work centrality' in our lives is instructive."

== Awards and honors ==
- 1983 – Stirling Prize, Society for Psychological Anthropology
- 2024 - 2029 – Jean M. Pitzer Endowed Chair, Pitzer College
- 2025 – Lifetime Achievement Award, Society for Psychological Anthropology

== Bibliography ==
=== Books ===
- Human Motives and Cultural Models. 1992. ISBN 9781139166515.
- Strauss, Claudia; Quinn, Naomi (1997). A Cognitive Theory of Cultural Meaning. Cambridge University Press. ISBN 9780521595414.
- Making Sense of Public Opinion: American Discourses about Immigration and Social Programs. 2012. ISBN 9781107019928.
- Strauss, Claudia; Friedman, Jack R. (2018). Political Sentiments and Social Movements: The Person in Politics and Culture. Springer. ISBN 9783319723419.
- What Work Means: Beyond the Puritan Work Ethic. 2024. ISBN 9781501775529.

=== Selected articles ===
- Strauss, Claudia (1992). "Models and motives". In D'Andrade, Roy G.; Strauss, Claudia (eds.). Human motives and cultural models. Cambridge University Press. pp. 1–20. doi:10.1017/CBO9781139166515.002. ISBN 978-0-521-42338-0.
- Strauss, Claudia (1992). "What makes Tony run? Schemas as motives reconsidered". In D'Andrade, Roy G.; Strauss, Claudia (eds.). Human motives and cultural models. Cambridge University Press. pp. 197–224. doi:10.1017/CBO9781139166515.010. ISBN 978-0-521-42338-0.
- Strauss, Claudia (1997). "Partly fragmented, partly integrated: an anthropological examination of "postmodern fragmented subjects"". Cultural Anthropology. 12 (3): 362–404. doi:10.1525/can.1997.12.3.362.
- Strauss, Claudia (2005). "Analyzing discourse for cultural complexity". In Kitayama, Shinobu; Cohen, Dov (eds.). Culture, Mind and Society. Palgrave Macmillan US. pp. 203–242. doi:10.1007/978-1-137-05871-3_6. ISBN 978-1-4039-6915-6.
