= Viviana Rivero =

Argentinian writer (born 1966)

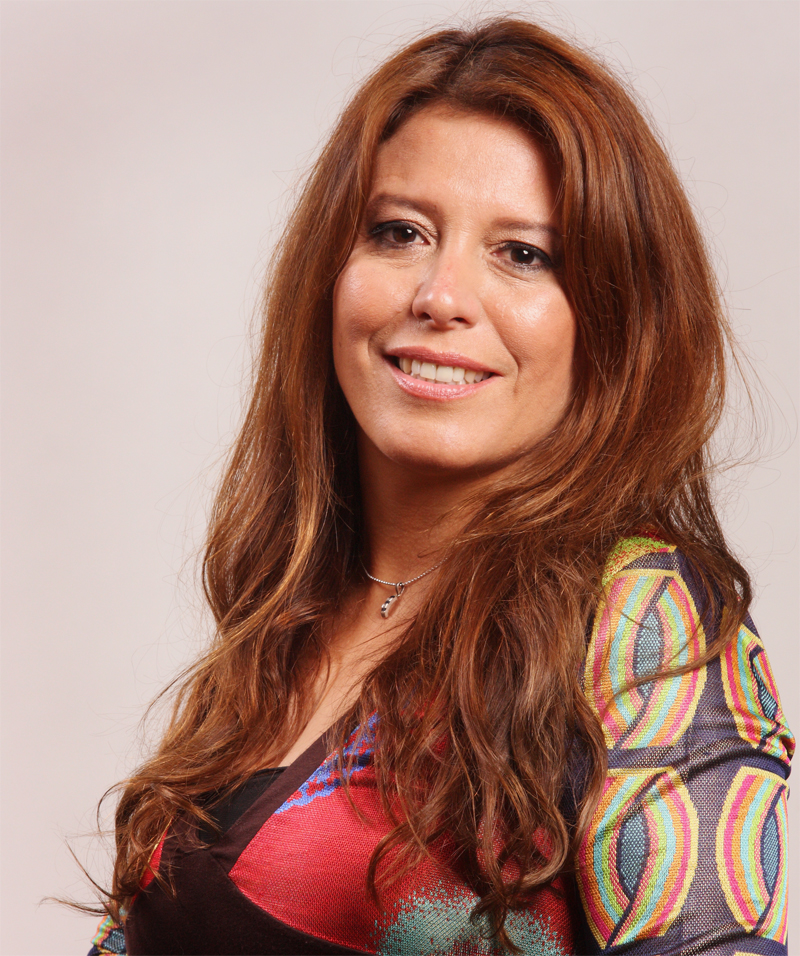
Viviana Rivero (2014)

Viviana Rivero (born February 1, 1966) is an Argentine writer of historical novels and romantic realism.

== Biography ==
Viviana E. Rivero was born in Córdoba, Argentina, February 1, 1966, where she resides with her family. She is the daughter of the writer Pedro Adrián Rivero and Elena Fabris. She has two sons.

Rivero is a lawyer. Before dedicating herself fully to writing literature, she was a litigator, legal advisor for companies, founder and coach of numerous self-leadership groups for the growth and development of women as well as a producer and host of television shows.

Rivero is a columnist for numerous media such as Rumbos magazine, Vanidades magazine, and Para ti magazine. Her first novel, Secreto bien guardado (Well kept secret) was a best seller a few months after it was published. Secreto bien guardado was made into a film with great success, the main characters played by Oriana Sabatini and Victorio D´Alessandro.

Rivero and the historian, Lucia Gálvez, co-authored the book 10 Lugares Mágicos, which is used in schools and institutions. In 2018, Rivero embarked on an unprecedented experience: writing something new to accompany that book live and direct. The “Living Book” project planned by Google with the collaboration of Grupo Planeta, took place at the end of September.3

The magazine Gente included Rivero for the classic cover, "the figures of 2018".

Her books are published in Argentina, Mexico, Colombia, Chile, Uruguay, Spain, Italy and other countries.

== Awards and honours ==
Her novel Mujer y maestra was the winner of the first historical novel prize in a contest organized by the Government of San Luis. In 2011, the Legislature of Córdoba Province awarded her the outstanding artist of the year. In the same year, Rivero was nominated for the Cordovan of the Year award by the newspaper La Voz del Interior for her literary activity, obtaining recognition as an outstanding Cordovan of the year 2011. In 2016, she was the winner of the Reader's Prize for her book Los colores de la felicidad at the 43rd Buenos Aires International Book Fair.

== Works ==
- Secreto bien guardado (novel - 2010)
- Mujer y maestra (novel - 2010)
- Y ellos se fueron (novel - 2011)
- 10 lugares mágicos de la Argentina (2011)
- Lo que no se dice (novel - 2012)
- La dama de noche (novel - 2013)
- Basta (anthology - 2013)
- La magia de la vida (novel - 2014)
- Los colores de la felicidad (novel - 2015)
- Sí (2017)
- Zafiros en la piel (novel - 2018)
- La música del destino (novel - 2018)
- El alma de las flores (novel - 2019)
