= Nikkita Fountain =

Bahamian tennis player (born 1984)

- Country (sports): Bahamas
- Born: 24 March 1984 (age 41); Nassau, Bahamas
- Height: 5 ft 6 in (168 cm)
- Plays: Right-handed

Doubles
- Highest ranking: No. 667 (22 Oct 2012)
Medal record
Central American and Caribbean Games
Gold medal – first place	2010 Mayagüez	Women's Doubles

Nikkita Fountain (born 24 March 1984) is a Bahamian former professional tennis player.

Born in Nassau, Fountain appeared in a national record 36 Fed Cup ties for the Bahamas, winning 10 singles and 12 doubles rubbers. Debuting in 1999, she didn't feature in the side while at college between 2004 and 2007, then returned to the side and played until 2014. She competed in college tennis for Southern Nazarene University and Florida International University.

Fountain was a doubles gold medalist at the 2010 Central American and Caribbean Games, partnering Larika Russell. The final was decided by a third set match tie-break, which they mounted a comeback in to win 13–11 over their Dominican Republic opponents Daysi Espinal and Francesca Segarelli.

At the 2010 Commonwealth Games in Delhi, Fountain was a quarter-finalist in the doubles and lost in the first round of the singles, to eighth seed Marina Erakovic of New Zealand.
