= Mari Toro =

Puerto Rican tennis player

- Country (sports): Puerto Rico
- Born: November 11, 1979 (age 45)
- Height: 5 ft 9 in (175 cm)
- College: Florida International University; University of Miami

Singles
- Career record: 15–11 (Fed Cup)
- Highest ranking: No. 912 (Mar 16, 1998)

Doubles
- Career record: 11–6 (Fed Cup)
- Highest ranking: No. 723 (Mar 16, 1998)
Medal record
Central American and Caribbean Games
Gold medal – first place	2002 San Salvador	Women's doubles
Bronze medal – third place	1998 Maracaibo	Women's team

Mari Toro (born November 11, 1979) is a Puerto Rican former professional tennis player.

Toro began playing tennis at the age of six and was educated in Miami. Undefeated in her only season of high school tennis, she was ranked in the top-five for the 18s category in Florida.

As a collegiate player she had one season at Florida International University, before transferring as a sophomore to the University of Miami, where her elder sister Tari Ann was one of the coaches.

Between 1997 and 2002, Toro appeared in 26 ties for the Puerto Rico Fed Cup team, winning 15 singles rubbers. Her 11 wins in doubles play remains a team record. She was a women's doubles gold medalist at the 2002 Central American and Caribbean Games in San Salvador, partnering Vilmarie Castellvi.
