= La Libertad, El Salvador =

La Libertad
- District
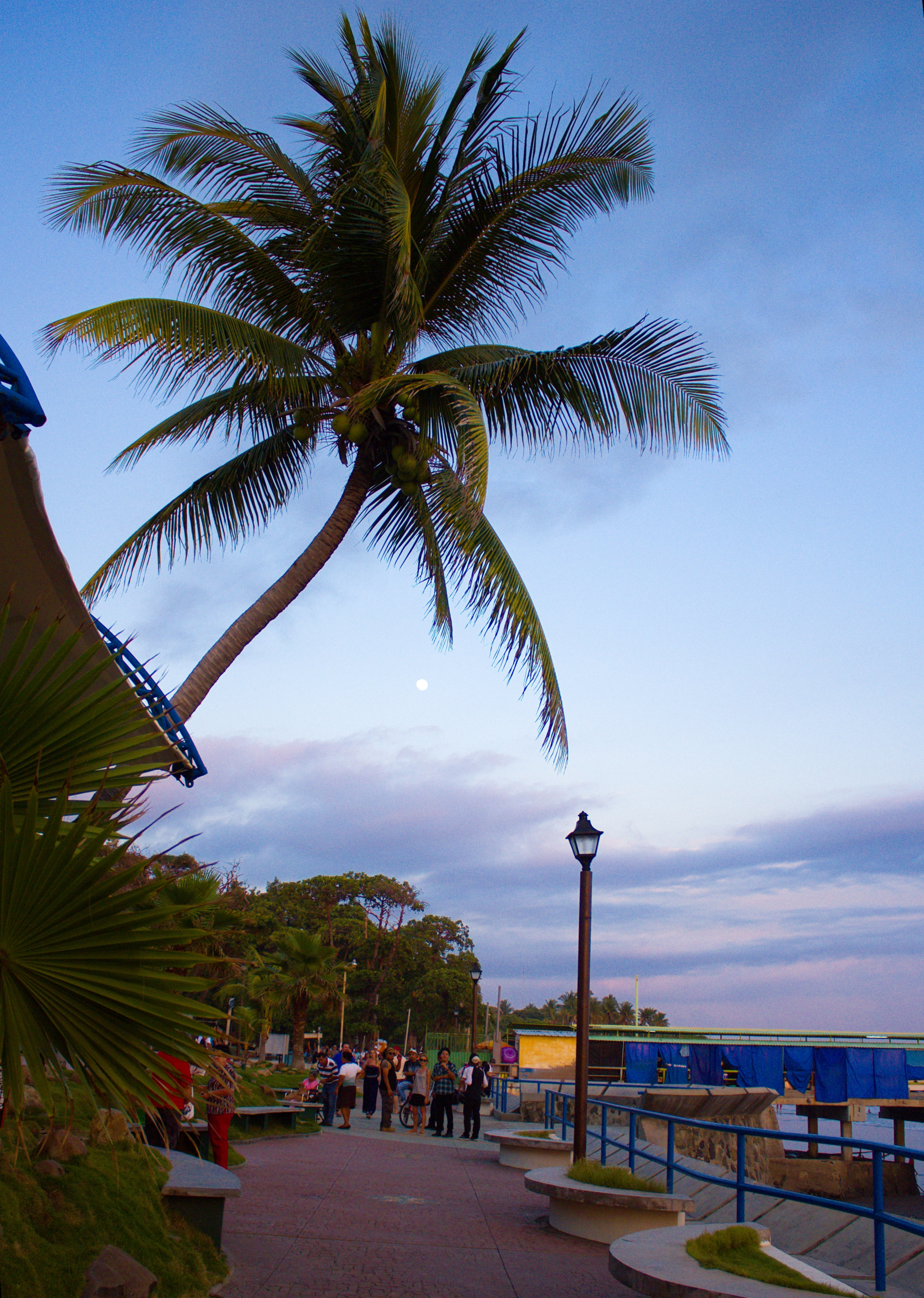
- Nicknames: Puerto de La Libertad; El Puerto
- Location in El Salvador
- Coordinates: 13°29′N 89°19′W
- Country: El Salvador
- Department: La Libertad

Government
  - Mayor: Miguel Jiménez (ARENA)
- Elevation: 98 ft (30 m)

Population (2024)
  - District: 44,761
  - Rank: 32nd in El Salvador
  - Urban: 32,022
  - Rural: 12,739
- Postal code: 1511

La Libertad ('Liberty') also known as the Puerto de La Libertad or simply as El Puerto, is a municipality in the La Libertad Department of El Salvador. It had a population of 35,997 inhabitants in 2007 according to the official census of that year. It is one of the main tourist attractions in the country.

== History ==
In 1770, the area was documented by Pedro Cortés y Larraz, Archbishop of Guatemala from 1776 to 1779, as the Hacienda Tepeahua, one of the largest estates in the parish of San Jacinto. The region was formerly known as Tepehua, a name derived from Nahuatl meaning "mountain of the oak trees". On February 24, 1824, the Congress of the Federal Republic of Central America authorized the name Puerto de La Libertad ("Port of Freedom"). Commercial trade along the Pacific coast was authorized by the National Assembly in 1831, and the first steamboat arrived at La Libertad on June 7, 1857.

La Libertad was officially established as a village by an executive decree issued on July 19, 1858 and approved by Congress on February 11, 1859. The measure aimed to reduce the community's dependence on Huizúcar, which was located at a considerable distance and connected by poor roads.

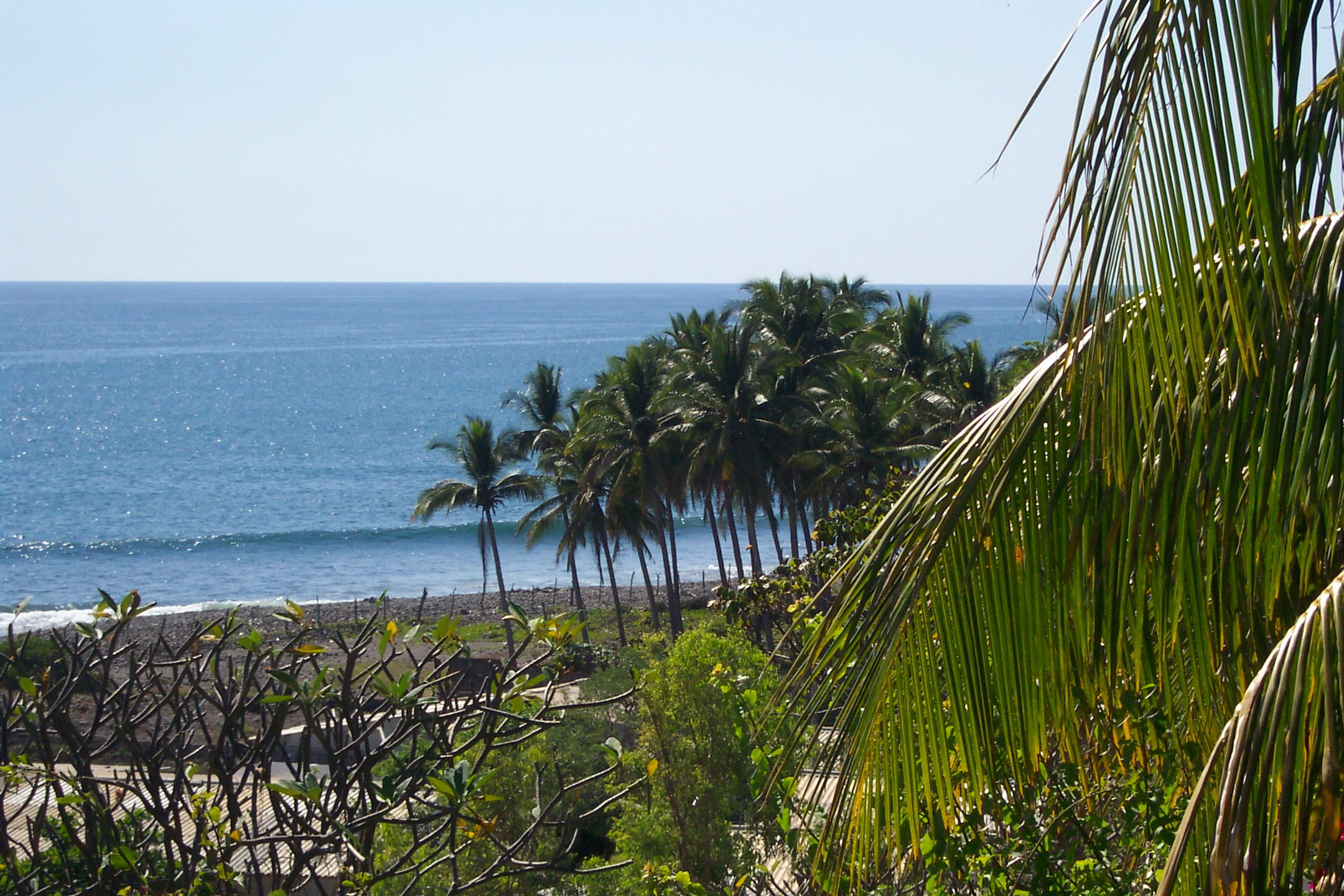
Tropical beach at La Libertad

The town became part of the department of La Libertad on January 28, 1865 and had a population of 266 by 1869. On May 4, 1867, the Salvadoran government awarded a contract to construct an iron pier, which opened on October 7, 1869. Before its construction, barges were unloaded using mooring lines. A telegraph line connecting San Salvador with the port was inaugurated on April 27, 1870. La Libertad was granted villa (town) status on March 10, 1874 and ciudad (city) status on 23 August 1957

The municipality covers an area of 162 km^{2} with a maximum elevation of 10 m above sea level. Its economy is based primarily on agriculture and the service sector. The annual fiestas patronales (patron saint festivals) are held in December in honor of the Immaculate Conception.

== Tourism ==
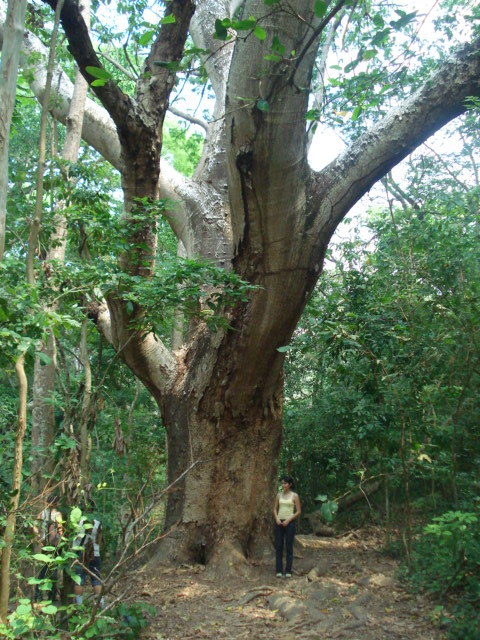
Walter Thilo Deininger National Park

El Puerto de La Libertad is one of the most representative tourist destinations in El Salvador. The resort includes a boardwalk, restaurants and an amphitheater, while small seafood markets and craft shops are located at the wharf. Construction of the first phase of the work was inaugurated on January 6, 2006, and completed in early 2010.

Beaches located in the municipality include Las Flores, San Diego, El Obispo, La Paz and El Majahual. El Palmarcito Beach is located 15 km to the west.

Among the area's highlights is the Parque Nacional Walter Thilo Deininger (Walter Thilo Deininger National Park), situated on the Coastal Highway (CA-2) near Playa San Diego, going east from La Libertad towards the El Salvador International Airport. The Deiningers were the first German immigrants to settle in the La Libertad department. They established dairies, cattle ranches and coffee plantations.

The Sunset Park amusement park opened in La Libertad on 27 August 2022.

== Surfing ==
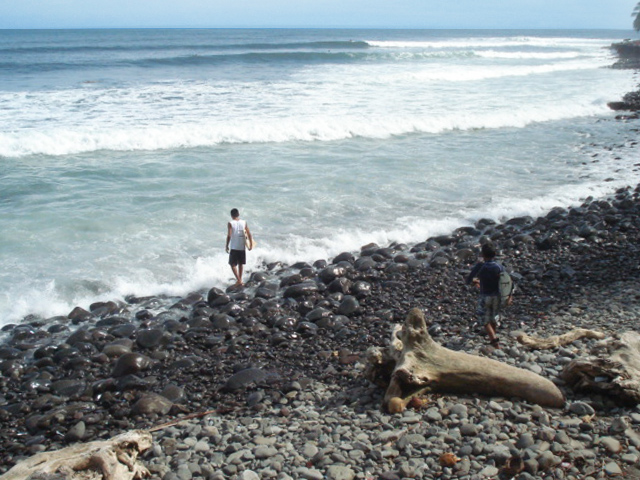
The surf break at Punta Roca

La Libertad has one of the best right hand point breaks in Central America, and is El Salvador's surf capital, with surf shops, board rentals and repair shops. Punta Roca (Rock Point) hosts regional and international surfing championships. It is known for its fast and hollow waves, many of which break for 100–200 yards (90–180m). As recently as the 1970s only a few local surfers ventured there, until it was discovered by a few internationally recognized surfers, including Gerry Lopez, who traveled there frequently. He encouraged a new cadre of locals to adopt the sport. El Salvador went through a civil war in the 1980s, and getting to Punta Roca became dangerous. This slowed the influx of visitors, and resulted in a scarcity of surf boards for the locals, whose only means of obtaining a surf board was by travelers leaving them behind in exchange for guidance and accommodations. The well-known local surfer, "Yepi", was one of the first in his generation to take a leadership role in popularizing the sport among Salvadorans. Other local surfers have helped spread surfing's popularity throughout the country by offering custom surf tours to tourists and other visitors.

The main break extends from La Punta to the township, a distance of about 800m, although single rides do not normally connect the sections through the whole distance. There are three main sections: the top of the point is a hollow and fast wave called "La Punta". The middle section is in front of the cemetery. The inside cove, fronting the town's restaurants, is called "La Paz"; this section is good for longboarding. On a good day, when the swell is 6 to 8 feet high (Hawaiian scale), the upper part of the point produces the best waves, allowing a ride of about 300m or more. It is relatively easy to "drop in" on the long, fast, and powerful walls, which turn into hollow barrels on the best days. The main takeoff is close to a dangerous rock which often sticks out of the water, and has caused injuries. Surfing is good on all tides, although low tide probably produces more barreled waves. The wave form of this break is unusual in that it often breaks at a slight angle to the shoreline, hitting it slightly squarely, creating powerful and fast walls. It can be difficult to get outside in large swells, and the rocky shoreline is notorious for its difficult entry.

Further down the point are a few other breaks, including next to the cemetery and in the town itself. These are less crowded and can produce waist-high waves on occasions, but the world-class section of the point is far outside of town.

Other surf spots in the region include: Conchalio, La Paz, San Diego, El Sunzal, La Bocana, and El Zonte.

== The Pier ==
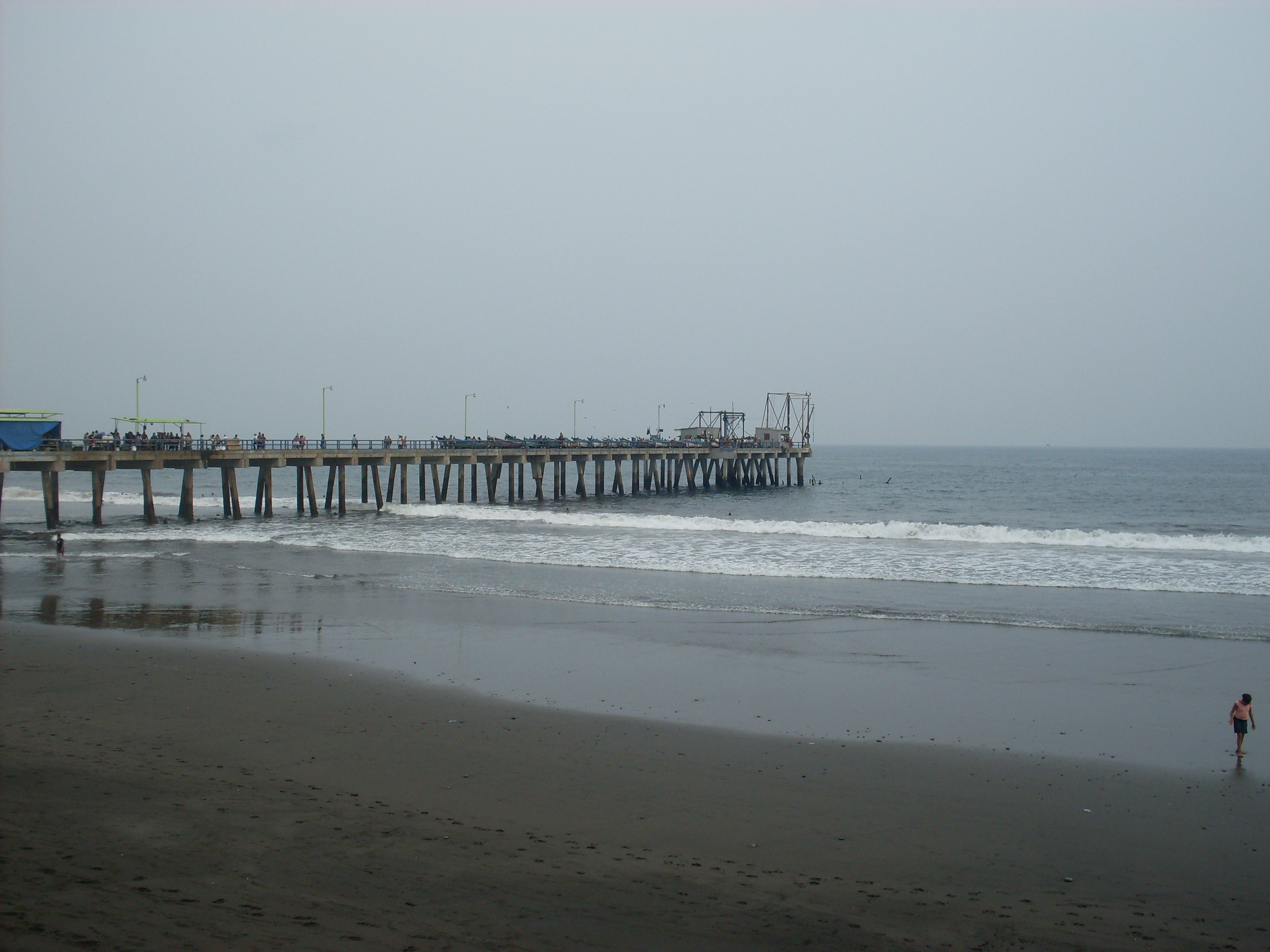
Puerto de La Libertad Pier

El Puerto de La Libertad was the first port built in El Salvador. It has evolved into a fishing boat port, a farmers market, and a tourist attraction. Two newer ports in the country have replaced it economically, La Union and Puerto de Acajutla. The original pier was built in 1869, but over time the structure deteriorated and was replaced by a modern structure, which underwent a major renovation in 2003. Fishing boats are lowered into the ocean by a crane located at its end. Local fishermen sell their catch of the day here; seafood on display includes a variety of fish such as snapper, tuna, and rays, as well as squid, shrimp, lobster, blue crabs (popularly known as "jaibas"), clams, and scallops. During the 2001 series of earthquakes the pier was partially damaged; the damaged section was reconstructed and reinforced.

== Transportation ==
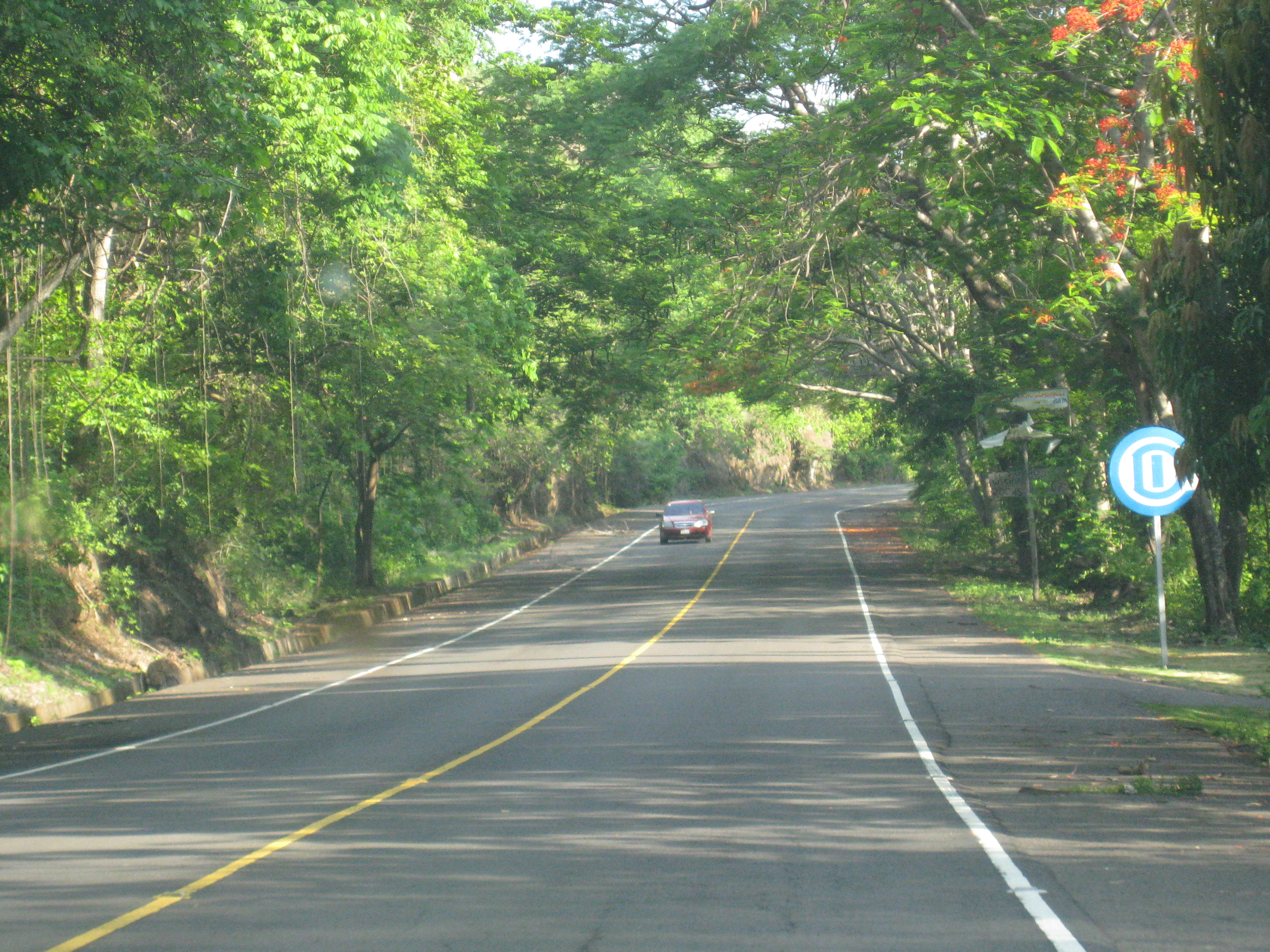
CA-2 Acajutla

Several freeways connect the city of La Libertad with the rest of the country, among these are:

- CA-4 or Carretera al Puerto - Connects to San Salvador
- CA-2 or El Litoral - Connects to Sonsonate, Zacatecoluca, Ahuachapán, and to the international airport.

Other freeways and roads connecting with La Libertad non-directly are:

- CA-5 - detour to CA-2 connects to San Salvador
- CA-11 - detour to CA-2 connects to San Julian, El Salvador
- CA-12 - detour to CA-2 connects to Acajutla, Santa Ana & Sonsonate
- CA-15 - detour to CA-2 connects to Ahuchapan
- CA-6 - detour to CA-2 connects to Santa Cruz, El Salvador
