= Liz Cruz (tennis) =

Salvadoran tennis player (born 1985)

- Country (sports): El Salvador
- Born: 21 July 1985 (age 40) San Salvador, El Salvador
- Retired: 2009
- Plays: Right-handed (two-handed backhand)
- Prize money: $3,593

Singles
- Career record: 9 - 16
- Highest ranking: 805 (26 April 2004)

Doubles
- Career record: 16 - 16
- Highest ranking: 656 (12 April 2004)

Team competitions
- Fed Cup: 14–11

Liz Cruz (born 21 July 1985) is a former Salvadoran tennis player.

Cruz has a WTA singles career high ranking of 805 achieved on 26 April 2004. She also has a WTA doubles career high ranking of 656 achieved on 12 April 2004.

Playing for El Salvador in Fed Cup, Cruz has a W/L record of 14–11.

== ITF finals (0–2) ==
=== Doubles (0–2) ===
| Legend $100,000 tournaments $75,000 tournaments $50,000 tournaments $25,000 tournaments $10,000 tournaments | Finals by surface Hard (0–0) Clay (0–2) Grass (0–0) Carpet (0–0) |

| Result | Date | Category | Tournament | Surface | Partner | Opponents | Score |
|---|---|---|---|---|---|---|---|
| Runner-up | 16 September 2002 | 10,000 | Santo Domingo, Dominican Republic | Clay | (El Salvador) Ana Osorio | (Ecuador) Emma Zuleta (Ecuador) Hilda Zuleta Cabrera | 4–6, 4–6 |
| Runner-up | 6 October 2003 | 10,000 | San Salvador, El Salvador | Clay | (El Salvador) Marcela Rodezno | (Argentina) Soledad Esperón (Argentina) Flavia Mignola | 4–6, 6–2, 2–6 |

== Fed Cup participation ==
=== Singles ===
| Edition | Date | Location | Against | Surface | Opponent | W/L | Score |
|---|---|---|---|---|---|---|---|
| 2002 Fed Cup; Americas Zone Group II | 14 May 2002 | Havana, Cuba | (Bermuda) Bermuda | Hard | (Bermuda) Zarah De Silva | W | 6–2, 6–0 |
| 2002 Fed Cup; Americas Zone Group II | 15 May 2002 | Havana, Cuba | Chile | Hard | (Chile) Carolina Aravena | W | 6–1, 2–6, 6–2 |
| 2002 Fed Cup; Americas Zone Group II | 16 May 2002 | Havana, Cuba | Bolivia | Hard | (Bolivia) Mónica Poveda | L | 4–6, 6–7 |
| 2002 Fed Cup; Americas Zone Group II | 17 May 2002 | Havana, Cuba | Dominican Republic | Hard | (Dominican Republic) Glenny Cepeda | W | 6–3, 5–7, 6–2 |
| 2002 Fed Cup; Americas Zone Group II | 18 May 2002 | Havana, Cuba | Panama | Hard | (Panama) Yimara Figueroa | W | 6–1, 6–1 |
| 2003 Fed Cup; Americas Zone Group I | 23 April 2003 | Campinas, Brazil | (Cuba) Cuba | clay | (Cuba) Yanet Núñez Mojarena | L | 6–2, 4–6, 1–6 |
| 2003 Fed Cup; Americas Zone Group I | 24 April 2003 | Campinas, Brazil | Brazil | clay | (Brazil) Maria Fernanda Alves | L | 1–6, 1–6 |
| 2003 Fed Cup; Americas Zone Group I | 25 April 2003 | Campinas, Brazil | Paraguay | clay | (Paraguay) Amanda Melgarejo | W | 6–1, 6–4 |
| 2003 Fed Cup; Americas Zone Group I | 26 April 2003 | Campinas, Brazil | Canada | clay | (Canada) Maureen Drake | L | 0–6, 0–6 |
| 2004 Fed Cup; Asia/Oceania Zone I | 20 April 2004 | Bahia, Brazil | (Puerto Rico) Puerto Rico | Clay | (Puerto Rico) Vilmarie Castellvi | L | 2–6, 1–6 |
| 2004 Fed Cup; Asia/Oceania Zone I | 21 April 2004 | Bahia, Brazil | Mexico | Clay | (Mexico) Daniela Múñoz Gallegos | L | 5–7, 2–6 |
| 2004 Fed Cup; Asia/Oceania Zone I | 22 April 2004 | Bahia, Brazil | Colombia | Clay | (Colombia) Karen Castiblanco | W | 6–3, 6–1 |
| 2004 Fed Cup; Asia/Oceania Zone I | 23 April 2004 | Bahia, Brazil | Canada | Clay | (Canada) Marie-Ève Pelletier | L | 2–6, 4–6 |
