= Marcela Rodezno =

Salvadoran tennis player (born 1985)

- Full name: Marcela Ivón Rodezno Hernández
- Country (sports): El Salvador
- Born: 8 January 1985 (age 40) La Libertad, El Salvador

Singles
- Career record: 4–11
- Highest ranking: No. 920 (3 Nov 2003)

Doubles
- Career record: 10–12
- Highest ranking: No. 680 (3 Nov 2003)
Medal record
Central American and Caribbean Games
Bronze medal – third place	2002 San Salvador	Women's Team

Marcela Ivón Rodezno Hernández (born 8 January 1985) is a Salvadoran former professional tennis player.

== Tennis career ==
Rodezno made her Fed Cup debut for El Salvador in 2000. She won three gold medals at the 2001 Central American Games and a bronze medal at the 2002 Central American and Caribbean Games. In 2003 she represented El Salvador at the Pan American Games in Santo Domingo and made the quarter-finals of the doubles. She continued to play in the Fed Cup until 2004, for a total of 15 ties, from which she won eight singles and four doubles rubbers.

Between 2004 and 2008 she played collegiate tennis for South Carolina State University.

In 2020 she won the national doubles championships for American platform tennis.

== Personal life ==
Rodezno was born and raised in La Libertad.

In 2010 she married Romanian Johnny Hurduc and they live with their two children in the United States.

== ITF finals ==
=== Doubles: 1 (0–1) ===
Outcome	No.	Date	Tournament	Surface	Partner	Opponents	Score
Runner-up	1.	6 October 2003	San Salvador, El Salvador	Clay	(El Salvador) Liz Cruz	(Argentina) Soledad Esperón (Argentina) Flavia Mignola	4–6, 6–2, 2–6
