= 2008 Fed Cup Americas Zone Group II – play-offs =

The 2008 Fed Cup Americas Zone Group II play-offs were the final stages of the Group II Zonal Competition involving teams from the Americas. Using the positions determined in their pools, the thirteen teams faced off to determine their placing in the 2008 Fed Cup Americas Zone Group II. The top two teams advanced to Group I for next year.

Placing	Pool A	Pool B	Pool C	Pool D
1	Chile	Bolivia	Venezuela	Bahamas
2	Cuba	Ecuador	Guatemala	Dominican Republic
3	Panama	Honduras	Barbados	Trinidad and Tobago
4				Bermuda

== Promotion play-offs ==
The first teams of each pool were placed against each other in two head-to-head rounds. The winner of the rounds advanced to Group I for 2009.

=== Chile vs. Venezuela ===
Chile
1
Country Club Cochabamba, Cochabamba, Bolivia
26 April 2008
Red clay (outdoors)

Venezuela
2

			1	2	3
1	(Chile) (Venezuela)	Melisa Miranda; Marina Giral Lores	3; 6	6; 4	6; 3
2	(Chile) (Venezuela)	Andrea Koch-Benvenuto; Milagros Sequera	6^{5} 7^{7}	2; 6
3	(Chile) (Venezuela)	Andrea Koch-Benvenuto / Melisa Miranda; Mariana Muci / Milagros Sequera	3; 6	3; 6

=== Bolivia vs. Bahamas ===
Bolivia
1
Country Club Cochabamba, Cochabamba, Bolivia
26 April 2008
Red clay (outdoors)

Bahamas
2

			1	2	3
1	(Bolivia) (The Bahamas)	Claudia Herbas; Nikkita Fountain	7; 5	6; 4
2	(Bolivia) (The Bahamas)	Daniela Trigo; Larikah Russell	2; 6	4; 6
3	(Bolivia) (The Bahamas)	Diana Kyllmann / Daniela Trigo; Nikkita Fountain / Larikah Russell	5; 7	2; 6

== Fifth to Seventh play-offs ==
The second-placed teams from each pool were drawn in head-to-head rounds to find the fifth and seventh placed teams.

=== Cuba vs. Guatemala ===
Cuba
2
Country Club Cochabamba, Cochabamba, Bolivia
26 April 2008
Red clay (outdoors)

Guatemala
1

			1	2	3
1	(Cuba) (Guatemala)	Yanet Núñez Mojarena; Ana Lilyan Guzmán	6; 2	6; 3
2	(Cuba) (Guatemala)	Yamile Fors Guerra; Jessica Lehnhoff	6; 1	2; 6	1; 6
3	(Cuba) (Guatemala)	Yamile Fors Guerra / Yanet Núñez Mojarena; Ana Lilyan Guzmán / Jessica Lehnhoff	7^{7} 6^{2}	7; 5

=== Ecuador vs. Dominican Republic ===
Ecuador
3
Country Club Cochabamba, Cochabamba, Bolivia
26 April 2008
Red clay (outdoors)

Dominican Republic
0

			1	2	3
1	(Ecuador) (Dominican Republic)	Marie Elise Casares; Natalia Báez	6; 3	6; 2
2	(Ecuador) (Dominican Republic)	Lorena Avilés; Francesca Segarelli	6; 4	6; 2
3	(Ecuador) (Dominican Republic)	Marie Elise Casares / Gisella Pere; Natalia Báez / Francesca Segarelli	6; 3	6; 2

== Ninth and Eleventh play-offs ==
The third-placed teams from each pool were drawn in head-to-head rounds to find the ninth and eleventh placed teams.

=== Panama vs. Barbados ===
Panama
2
Country Club Cochabamba, Cochabamba, Bolivia
26 April 2008
Red clay (outdoors)

Barbados
1

			1	2	3
1	(Panama) (Barbados)	Elizabeth Tapia; Kristen Lopez	6; 3	7; 5
2	(Panama) (Barbados)	Nicole Stanziola; Alyssa Fuentes	6; 2	6; 2
3	(Panama) (Barbados)	Johanna de León / Nicole Stanziola; Alyssa Fuentes / Kristen Lopez	6; 4	1; 6	3; 6

=== Honduras vs. Trinidad and Tobago ===
Honduras
2
Country Club Cochabamba, Cochabamba, Bolivia
26 April 2008
Red clay (outdoors)

Trinidad and Tobago
1

			1	2	3
1	(Honduras) (Trinidad and Tobago)	Marisela Avilés; Lee-Anne Lingo	7^{7} 6^{2}	7; 5
2	(Honduras) (Trinidad and Tobago)	Zulema Zelaya; Raye-Ann Sandy	6; 0	7; 5
3	(Honduras) (Trinidad and Tobago)	Leyla Taracena / Zulema Zelaya; Carlista Mohammed / Raye-Ann Sandy	5; 7	0; 4		retired

== Thirteenth ==
As there was only three teams from Pools A, B and C as opposed to the four from Pool D, the last-placed team from Pool D (Bermuda) had no equivalent to play against. Thus the Bermudians were automatically allocated thirteenth place.

== Final Placements ==
Placing	Teams	
Promoted	Venezuela	Bahamas
Third	Chile	Bolivia
Fifth	Cuba	Ecuador
Seventh	Guatemala	Dominican Republic
Ninth	Panama	Honduras
Eleventh	Barbados	Trinidad and Tobago
Thirteenth	Bermuda	

- Venezuela and Bahamas advanced to the Americas Zone Group I for the next year. The Bahamians placed fifth overall, meaning that they were relegated back to Group II for 2010, while the Venezuelans did not compete.

== See also ==
- Fed Cup structure
