= 2007 Fed Cup Americas Zone =

Subsection of tennis competition

The Americas Zone was one of three zones of regional competition in the 2007 Fed Cup.

== Group I ==
- Venue: Pilara Tenis Club, Buenos Aires, Argentina (outdoor clay)
- Date: 18–21 April

The seven teams were divided into one pool of three teams and one pool of four. The top team of each pool played-off against each other to decide which two nations progress to the World Group II Play-offs. The four nations coming third in each pool then played-off to determine which team would join the fourth-placed team from the four-team pool in being relegated down to Group II for 2008.

=== Pools ===
	Pool A	BRA	MEX	CHI
1	Brazil (1–1)		2–1	1–2
2	Mexico (1–1)	1–2		2–1
3	Chile (1–1)	2–1	1–2	

	Pool B	ARG	COL	PUR	DOM
1	Argentina (3–0)		3–0	3–0	3–0
2	Colombia (2–1)	0–3		3–0	3–0
3	Puerto Rico (1–2)	0–3	0–3		3–0
4	Dominican Republic (0–3)	0–3	0–3	0–3	

=== Play-offs ===
Placing	A Team	Score	B Team
Promotion	Brazil	0–2	Argentina
3rd–4th	Mexico	0–2	Colombia
Relegation	Chile	0–2	Puerto Rico
Relegation		N/A	Dominican Republic

- Argentina advanced to 2007 World Group II Play-offs.
- Chile and Dominican Republic was relegated to Group II for 2008.

== Group II ==
- Venue: Carrasco Lawn Tennis Club, Montevideo, Uruguay (outdoor clay)
- Date: 16–21 April

The nine teams were divided into one pool of four teams and one pool of five. The top two teams of each pool played-off against each other to decide which two nations progress to the Group I.

=== Pools ===
	Pool A	URU	ECU	BER	HON
1	Uruguay (3–0)		2–1	3–0	3–0
2	Ecuador (2–1)	1–2		3–0	3–0
3	Bermuda (1–2)	0–3	0–3		2–1
4	Honduras (0–3)	0–3	0–3	1–2	

	Pool B	PAR	BOL	GUA	TRI	BAR
1	Paraguay (4–0)		2–1	2–1	3–0	3–0
2	Bolivia (3–1)	1–2		2–1	2–1	3–0
3	Guatemala (2–2)	1–2	1–2		3–0	3–0
4	Trinidad and Tobago (1–3)	0–3	1–2	0–3		3–0
5	Barbados (0–4)	0–3	0–3	0–3	0–3	

=== Play-offs ===
Placing	A Team	Score	B Team
Promotion	Uruguay	2–1	Bolivia
Promotion	Ecuador	1–2	Paraguay
5th–6th	Bermuda	0–3	Guatemala
7th–8th	Honduras	1–2	Trinidad and Tobago
9th		N/A	Barbados

- Uruguay and Paraguay advanced to Group I for 2008.

== See also ==
- Fed Cup structure
