= 2004 Fed Cup Americas Zone Group II – play-offs =

Tennis competition play-offs

The play-offs of the 2004 Fed Cup Americas Zone Group I were the final stages of the Group I Zonal Competition involving teams from the Americas. Using the positions determined in their pools, the seven teams faced off to determine their placing in the 2004 Fed Cup Americas Zone Group II. The top two teams advanced to Group II for the next year.

Placing	Pool A	Pool B
1	Paraguay	Bolivia
2	Jamaica	Venezuela
3	Ecuador	
4	Guatemala	Dominican Republic

== Promotion play-offs ==
The first and second placed teams of each pool were placed against each other in two head-to-head rounds. The winner of the rounds advanced to Group II for 2005.

=== Paraguay vs. Venezuela ===
Paraguay
2
Porto Seguro, Bahia, Brazil
24 April 2004
Red clay (outdoors)

Venezuela
1

			1	2	3
1	(Paraguay) (Venezuela)	Sarah Tami Masi; Paola Iovino	4; 6	7^{8} 6^{6}	5; 7
2	(Paraguay) (Venezuela)	Larissa Schaerer; Mariana Muci	6; 2	6; 2
3	(Paraguay) (Venezuela)	Larissa Schaerer / Sarah Tami Masi; Paola Iovino / Mariana Muci	6; 1	6; 1

=== Jamaica vs. Bolivia ===
Jamaica
1
Porto Seguro, Bahia, Brazil
24 April 2004
Red clay (outdoors)

Bolivia
2

			1	2	3
1	(Jamaica) (Bolivia)	Megan Moulton-Levy; Mónica Hoz De Vila	6; 0	6; 1
2	(Jamaica) (Bolivia)	Alanna Broderick; María Fernanda Álvarez Terán	3; 6	3; 6
3	(Jamaica) (Bolivia)	Alanna Broderick / Megan Moulton-Levy; María Fernanda Álvarez Terán / Mónica Hoz De Vila	7; 5	0; 6	3; 6

== Fifth ==
As there was only three teams from Pool B as opposed to the four from Pool A, the third-placed team from Pool A (Ecuador) had no equivalent to play against. Thus the Ecuadorians were automatically allocated fifth place.

== 6th to 7th play-offs ==
The last-placed teams from each pool were drawn in head-to-head rounds to find the sixth and seventh placed teams.

=== Guatemala vs. Dominican Republic ===
Guatemala
2
Porto Seguro, Bahia, Brazil
24 April 2004
Red clay (outdoors)

Dominican Republic
1

			1	2	3
1	(Guatemala) (Dominican Republic)	Karen Saravia; Chandra Capozzi	1; 6	7^{7} 6^{1}	4; 6
2	(Guatemala) (Dominican Republic)	Luise-Elfride López; Natalia Báez	6; 3	3; 6	6; 2
3	(Guatemala) (Dominican Republic)	Luise-Elfride López / Saira Sanchinelli; Natalia Báez / Chandra Capozzi	7^{9} 6^{7}	2; 6	7; 5

== Final Placements ==
Placing	Teams
Promoted	Paraguay
Promoted	Bolivia
Third	Venezuela
Third	Jamaica
Fifth	Ecuador
Sixth	Guatemala
Seventh	Dominican Republic

- Paraguay and Bolivia advanced to 2005 Fed Cup Americas Zone Group I. However, they both placed equal last and thus were relegated back to Group II for 2006.

== See also ==
- Fed Cup structure
