= 2007 Fed Cup Americas Zone Group I – play-offs =

Tennis competition

The play-offs of the 2007 Fed Cup Americas Zone Group I were the final stages of the group I zonal competition involving teams from the Americas. Using the positions determined in their pools, the seven teams faced off to determine their placing in the 2007 Fed Cup Americas Zone Group I. The team that ended up placing first overall advanced to World Group II play-offs, whilst those coming in sixth and seventh were relegated down to Group II for the next year.

Placing	Pool A	Pool B
1	Brazil	Argentina
2	Mexico	Colombia
3	Chile	Puerto Rico
4		Dominican Republic

== Promotional play-offs ==
The top team of each pool was placed against each other in a head-to-head round. The winner of the round advanced to World Group II for next year.

=== Brazil vs. Argentina ===
Brazil
0
Pilara Tenis Club, Buenos Aires, Argentina
21 April 2007
Red clay (outdoors)

Argentina
2

			1	2	3
1	(Brazil) (Argentina)	Maria Fernanda Alves; Jorgelina Cravero	2; 6	3; 6
2	(Brazil) (Argentina)	Jenifer Widjaja; Gisela Dulko	1; 6	2; 6
3	(Brazil) (Argentina)					not played

== Third to fourth play-off ==
The second placed teams of each pool were placed against each other in a ties. The winner of the tie was allocated third place in the Group while the loser was allocated fourth.

=== Mexico vs. Colombia ===
Mexico
0
Pilara Tenis Club, Buenos Aires, Argentina
21 April 2007
Red clay (outdoors)

Colombia
2

			1	2	3
1	(Mexico) (Colombia)	Erika Clarke; Viky Núñez Fuentes	4; 6	7; 5	0; 6
2	(Mexico) (Colombia)	Melissa Torres Sandoval; Mariana Duque Mariño	0; 1			retired
3	(Mexico) (Colombia)					not played

== Relegation play-offs ==
Because there was one extra player in Pool B, the last-placed team of that pool, Dominican Republic was automatically relegated down to Group II. The third-placed teams of each pool were then placed against each other in a tie, where the losing team would join the Dominicans in relegation.

=== Chile vs. Puerto Rico ===
Chile
0
Pilara Tenis Club, Buenos Aires, Argentina
21 April 2007
Red clay (outdoors)

Puerto Rico
2

			1	2	3
1	(Chile) (Puerto Rico)	Melisa Miranda; Vilmarie Castellvi	1; 6	6; 1	5; 7
2	(Chile) (Puerto Rico)	Andrea Koch-Benvenuto; Kristina Brandi	0; 6	4; 6
3	(Chile) (Puerto Rico)	Andrea Koch-Benvenuto / Melisa Miranda; Kristina Brandi / Vilmarie Castellvi				not played

== Final placements ==
Placing	Teams
Promoted	Argentina
Second	Brazil
Third	Colombia
Fourth	Mexico
Fifth	Puerto Rico
Relegated	Chile
Relegated	Dominican Republic

- Argentina advanced to the World Group II play-offs, and were drawn against Canada, where they won 3–1. The team thus advanced to World Group II for the next year.
- Chile and the Dominican Republic were relegated down to Americas Zone Group II for the next year. The Chileans placed equal third, while the Dominicans placed equal seventh.

== See also ==
- Fed Cup structure
