= 2008 Fed Cup Americas Zone Group I – play-offs =

The play-offs of the 2008 Fed Cup Americas Zone Group I were the final stages of the Group I Zonal Competition involving teams from the Americas. Using the positions determined in their pools, the seven teams faced off to determine their placing in the 2008 Fed Cup Americas Zone Group I. The team that ended up placing first overall advanced to World Group II play-offs, whilst those coming in sixth and seventh were relegated down to Group II for the next year.

Placing	Pool A	Pool B
1	Brazil	Colombia
2	Puerto Rico	Canada
3	Paraguay	Mexico
4	Uruguay	

== Promotion play-offs ==
The top team of each pool was placed against each other in a head-to-head round. The winner of the round advanced to World Group II for next year.

=== Brazil vs. Colombia ===
Brazil
0
Club Deportivo El Rodeo, Medellín, Colombia
2 February 2008
Red clay (outdoors)

Colombia
3

			1	2	3
1	(Brazil) (Colombia)	Maria Fernanda Alves; Mariana Duque Mariño	5; 7	0; 6
2	(Brazil) (Colombia)	Teliana Pereira; Catalina Castaño	2; 6	7; 5	3; 6
3	(Brazil) (Colombia)	Ana-Clara Duarte / Fernanda Hermenegildo; Viky Núñez Fuentes / Mariana Duque Mariño	2; 6	6; 2	4; 6

== Third to Fourth play-off ==
The second placed teams of each pool were placed against each other in a ties. The winner of the tie was allocated third place in the Group while the loser was allocated fourth.

=== Puerto Rico vs. Canada ===
Puerto Rico
0
Club Deportivo El Rodeo, Medellín, Colombia
2 February 2008
Red clay (outdoors)

Canada
3

			1	2	3
1	(Puerto Rico) (Canada)	Monica Puig; Ekaterina Shulaeva	2; 6	4; 6
2	(Puerto Rico) (Canada)	Vilmarie Castellvi; Aleksandra Wozniak	6; 3	1; 6	5; 7
3	(Puerto Rico) (Canada)	Monica Puig / Jessica Roland-Rosario; Stéphanie Dubois / Aleksandra Wozniak	3; 6	0; 6

== Relegation play-offs ==
Because there was one extra player in Pool A, the last-placed team of that pool (Uruguay) was automatically relegated down to Group II. The third-placed teams of each pool were then placed against each other in a tie, where the losing team would join the Uruguayans in relegation.

=== Paraguay vs. Mexico ===
Paraguay
3
Club Deportivo El Rodeo, Medellín, Colombia
2 February 2008
Red clay (outdoors)

Mexico
0

			1	2	3
1	(Paraguay) (Mexico)	Adriana Pereira; Valeria Pulido	7; 5	3; 6	6; 3
2	(Paraguay) (Mexico)	Rossana de los Ríos; Daniela Múñoz Gallegos	6; 0	6; 3
3	(Paraguay) (Mexico)	Rossana de los Ríos / Adriana Pereira; Daniela Múñoz Gallegos / Valeria Pulido				w/o

== Final Placements ==
Placing	Teams
Promoted	Colombia
Second	Brazil
Third	Canada
Fourth	Puerto Rico
Fifth	Paraguay
Relegated	Mexico
Relegated	Uruguay

- Colombia advanced to the World Group II play-offs, and were drawn against Belgium, where they lost 0–5. The team thus fell back to Group I for the next year.
- Mexico and Uruguay were relegated down to Americas Zone Group II for the next year. The Mexicans placed second in their pool of four, while the Uruguayans did not compete.

== See also ==
- Fed Cup structure
