= 2004 Fed Cup Americas Zone =

Subsection of tennis competition

The Americas Zone was one of three zones of regional competition in the 2004 Fed Cup.

== Group I ==
- Venue: Porto Seguro, Bahia, Brazil (outdoor clay)
- Date: 19–24 April

The nine teams were divided into two pools of four and five teams. The teams that finished first in the pools played-off against those that placed second to determine which team would partake in the World Group play-offs. The four nations coming last or second-to-last in the pools also played-off to determine which would be relegated to Group II for 2005.

=== Pools ===
	Pool A	MEX	ESA	COL	PUR
1	Mexico (3–0)		3–0	3–0	3–0
2	El Salvador (2–1)	0–3		2–0	2–1
3	Colombia (1–2)	0–3	0–2		2–1
4	Puerto Rico (0–3)	0–3	1–2	1–2	

	Pool B	CAN	BRA	CUB	CHI	URU
1	Canada (4–0)		2–1	3–0	2–0	3–0
2	Brazil (3–1)	1–2		2–0	3–0	3–0
3	Cuba (2–2)	0–3	0–2		2–1	2–1
4	Chile (1–3)	0–2	0–3	1–2		2–1
5	Uruguay (0–4)	0–3	0–3	1–2	1–2	

=== Play-offs ===
Placing	A Team	Score	B Team
Promotion	Mexico	0–2	Brazil
Promotion	El Salvador	0–2	Canada
5th	N/A		Cuba
Relegation	Colombia	0–2	Uruguay
Relegation	Puerto Rico	2–1	Chile

- Canada and Brazil advanced to 2004 World Group play-offs.
- Colombia and Chile was relegated to Group II for 2005.

== Group II ==
- Venue: Porto Seguro, Bahia, Brazil (outdoor clay)
- Date: 19–24 April

The nine teams were divided into one pool of four and one pool of five teams. The top two teams of both pools play off to decide which nation is promoted to the Americas Zone Group I for 2005, while the rest played against each other to determine overall placings.

=== Pools ===
	Pool A	PAR	JAM	ECU	GUA
1	Paraguay (3–0)		3–0	2–1	2–1
2	Jamaica (2–1)	0–3		2–1	3–0
3	Ecuador (1–2)	1–2	1–2		3–0
4	Guatemala (0–3)	1–2	0–3	0–3	

	Pool B	BOL	VEN	DOM
1	Bolivia (2–0)		2–1	3–0
2	Venezuela (1–1)	1–2		2–0
3	Dominican Republic (0–2)	0–3	0–2	

=== Play-offs ===
Placing	A Team	Score	B Team
Promotion	Paraguay	2–1	Venezuela
Promotion	Jamaica	1–2	Bolivia
5th	Ecuador		N/A
6th–7th	Guatemala	1–2	Dominican Republic

- Paraguay and Bolivia advanced to Group I for 2005.

== See also ==
- Fed Cup structure
