= 2007 Fed Cup Americas Zone Group II – play-offs =

Tennis competition play-offs

The play-offs of the 2007 Fed Cup Americas Zone Group II were the final stages of the Group II Zonal Competition involving teams from the Americas. Using the positions determined in their pools, the nine teams faced off to determine their placing in the 2007 Fed Cup Americas Zone Group II, with the top two teams of each pool playing for first to fourth. The teams finishing first advanced to Group I for the next year.

| Placing | Pool A | Pool B |
|---|---|---|
| 1 | Uruguay | Paraguay |
| 2 | Ecuador | Bolivia |
| 3 | Bermuda | Guatemala |
| 4 | Honduras | Trinidad and Tobago |
| 5 | | Barbados |

== Promotion play-offs ==
The first and second placed teams of each pool were placed against each other in two head-to-head rounds. The winner of the rounds advanced to Group I for 2008.

=== Uruguay vs. Bolivia ===
Uruguay
2
Carrasco Lawn Tennis Club, Montevideo, Uruguay
21 April 2007
Red clay (outdoors)

Bolivia
1

| | | | 1 | 2 | 3 |
|---|---|---|---|---|---|
| 1 | (Uruguay) (Bolivia) | María José Arechavaleta; Daniela Trigo | 2; 6 | 3; 6 |
| 2 | (Uruguay) (Bolivia) | Estefanía Craciun; María Fernanda Álvarez Terán | 6; 2 | 6; 0 |
| 3 | (Uruguay) (Bolivia) | María José Arechavaleta / Estefanía Craciun; Daniela Álvarez / María Fernanda Álvarez Terán | 3; 6 | 6; 4 | 6; 3 |

=== Ecuador vs. Paraguay ===
Ecuador
1
Carrasco Lawn Tennis Club, Montevideo, Uruguay
21 April 2007
Red clay (outdoors)

Paraguay
2

| | | | 1 | 2 | 3 |
|---|---|---|---|---|---|
| 1 | (Ecuador) (Paraguay) | Claudia Hidalgo; Verónica Cepede Royg | 2; 6 | 3; 6 |
| 2 | (Ecuador) (Paraguay) | Claudine Paulson; Rossana de los Ríos | 2; 6 | 1; 6 |
| 3 | (Ecuador) (Paraguay) | Lorena Avilés / Claudine Paulson; Verónica Cepede Royg / Adriana Pereira | 6; 3 | 6^{3} 7^{7} | 7; 5 |

== Fifth to Sixth play-offs ==
The third-placed teams from each pool were drawn in head-to-head rounds to find the fifth and sixth placed teams.

=== Bermuda vs. Guatemala ===
Bermuda
2
Carrasco Lawn Tennis Club, Montevideo, Uruguay
21 April 2007
Red clay (outdoors)

Guatemala
1

| | | | 1 | 2 | 3 |
|---|---|---|---|---|---|
| 1 | (Bermuda) (Guatemala) | Jacklyn Lambert; Ana Lilyan Guzmán | 7^{7} 6^{4} | 0; 6 | 1; 6 |
| 2 | (Bermuda) (Guatemala) | Ashley Brooks; Jessica Lehnhoff | 1; 6 | 1; 6 |
| 3 | (Bermuda) (Guatemala) | Ashley Brooks / Caitlin Gordon; Ana Lilyan Guzmán / Paulina Schippers | 4; 6 | 2; 6 |

== Seventh to Eighth play-offs ==
The fourth-placed teams from each pool were drawn in head-to-head rounds to find the seventh and eighth placed teams.

=== Honduras vs. Trinidad and Tobago ===
Honduras
1
Carrasco Lawn Tennis Club, Montevideo, Uruguay
21 April 2007
Red clay (outdoors)

Trinidad and Tobago
2

| | | | 1 | 2 | 3 |
|---|---|---|---|---|---|
| 1 | (Honduras) (Trinidad and Tobago) | Zulema Zelaya; Shenelle Mohammed | 6; 4 | 6; 3 |
| 2 | (Honduras) (Trinidad and Tobago) | Marisela Avilés; Olivia Bennett | 0; 6 | 0; 6 |
| 3 | (Honduras) (Trinidad and Tobago) | Sofía Barletta / María de los Ángeles Cárdenas; Olivia Bennett / Carlista Mohammed | 0; 6 | 2; 6 |

== Ninth ==
As there was only four teams from Pool A as opposed to the five from Pool B, the last-placed team from Pool B (Barbados) had no equivalent to play against. Thus the Barbadians were automatically allocated ninth place.

== Final Placements ==
| Placing | Teams |
| Promoted | Uruguay |
| Promoted | Paraguay |
| Third | Bolivia |
| Third | Ecuador |
| Fifth | Guatemala |
| Sixth | Bermuda |
| Seventh | Trinidad and Tobago |
| Eighth | Honduras |
| Ninth | Barbados |

- Uruguay and Paraguay advanced to 2008 Fed Cup Americas Zone Group I. The Paraguayans placed fifth overall, while the Uruguayans placed last and thus were relegated back to Group II for 2009.

== See also ==
- Fed Cup structure
