= 2008 Fed Cup Americas Zone Group II – Pool A =

Group A of the 2008 Fed Cup Americas Zone Group II was one of four pools in the Americas Zone Group II of the 2008 Fed Cup. Four teams competed in a round robin competition, with each team proceeding to their respective sections of the play-offs: the top team played for advancement to Group I.

		(Chile) CHI	(Cuba) CUB	(Panama) PAN	RR; W–L	Set; W–L	Game; W–L	Standings
51	Chile		2–1	3–0	2–0	10–3	71–41	1
70	Cuba	1–2		3–0	1–1	9–4	66–42	2
84	Panama	0–3	0–3		0–2	0–12	18–72	3

== Chile vs. Panama ==
Chile
3
Country Club Cochabamba, Cochabamba, Bolivia
23 April 2008
Red clay (outdoors)

Panama
0

			1	2	3
1	(Chile) (Panama)	Melisa Miranda; Elizabeth Tapia	6; 3	6; 1
2	(Chile) (Panama)	Andrea Koch-Benvenuto; Nicole Stanziola	6; 2	6; 2
3	(Chile) (Panama)	Andrea Koch-Benvenuto / Melisa Miranda; Johanna de León / Elizabeth Tapia	6; 2	6; 1

== Cuba vs. Panama ==
Cuba
3
Country Club Cochabamba, Cochabamba, Bolivia
24 April 2008
Red clay (outdoors)

Panama
0

			1	2	3
1	(Cuba) (Panama)	Yenisleydis Calaña Rodríguez; Elizabeth Tapia	6; 2	6; 2
2	(Cuba) (Panama)	Yamile Fors Guerra; Nicole Stanziola	6; 0	6; 0
3	(Cuba) (Panama)	Yamile Fors Guerra / Yanet Núñez Mojarena; Johanna de León / Nicole Stanziola	6; 3	6; 0

== Chile vs. Cuba ==
Chile
2
Country Club Cochabamba, Cochabamba, Bolivia
25 April 2008
Red clay (outdoors)

Cuba
1

			1	2	3
1	(Chile) (Cuba)	Melisa Miranda; Yanet Núñez Mojarena	6; 3	6; 2
2	(Chile) (Cuba)	Andrea Koch-Benvenuto; Yamile Fors Guerra	6; 1	5; 7	7; 5
3	(Chile) (Cuba)	Gabriela Roux / Camila Silva; Yamile Fors Guerra / Yanet Núñez Mojarena	2; 6	3; 6

== See also ==
- Fed Cup structure
