= 2008 Fed Cup Americas Zone Group II – Pool C =

Group C of the 2008 Fed Cup Americas Zone Group II was one of four pools in the Americas Zone Group II of the 2008 Fed Cup. Four teams competed in a round robin competition, with each team proceeding to their respective sections of the play-offs: the top team played for advancement to Group I.

		(Venezuela) VEN	(Guatemala) GUA	(Barbados) BAR	RR; W–L	Set; W–L	Game; W–L	Standings
62	Venezuela		2–1	3–0	2–0	10–2	56–37	1
67	Guatemala	1–2		3–0	1–1	8–4	63–42	2
87	Barbados	0–3	0–3		0–2	0–12	24–74	3

== Venezuela vs. Barbados ==
Venezuela
3
Country Club Cochabamba, Cochabamba, Bolivia
23 April 2008
Red clay (outdoors)

Barbados
0

			1	2	3
1	(Venezuela) (Barbados)	Marina Giral Lores; Alyssa Fuentes	6; 1	6; 1
2	(Venezuela) (Barbados)	Milagros Sequera; Richele Le Saldo	6; 0	6; 0
3	(Venezuela) (Barbados)	Josymar Escalona / Mariana Muci; Alyssa Fuentes / Richele Le Saldo	7; 5	6; 4

== Guatemala vs. Barbados ==
Guatemala
3
Country Club Cochabamba, Cochabamba, Bolivia
24 April 2008
Red clay (outdoors)

Barbados
0

			1	2	3
1	(Guatemala) (Barbados)	Melissa Morales; Alyssa Fuentes	6; 2	7; 5
2	(Guatemala) (Barbados)	Jessica Lehnhoff; Richele Le Saldo	6; 0	6; 1
3	(Guatemala) (Barbados)	Ana Lilyan Guzmán / Paulina Schippers; Alyssa Fuentes / Kristen Lopez	6; 3	6; 2

== Venezuela vs. Guatemala ==
Venezuela
2
Country Club Cochabamba, Cochabamba, Bolivia
25 April 2008
Red clay (outdoors)

Guatemala
1

			1	2	3
1	(Venezuela) (Guatemala)	Mariana Muci; Melissa Morales	5; 7	0; 6
2	(Venezuela) (Guatemala)	Milagros Sequera; Jessica Lehnhoff	6; 3	6; 4
3	(Venezuela) (Guatemala)	Mariana Muci / Milagros Sequera; Jessica Lehnhoff / Melissa Morales	6; 3	6; 3

== See also ==
- Fed Cup structure
