= Buranhém River =

Coordinates: 16°27′24″S 39°03′54″W

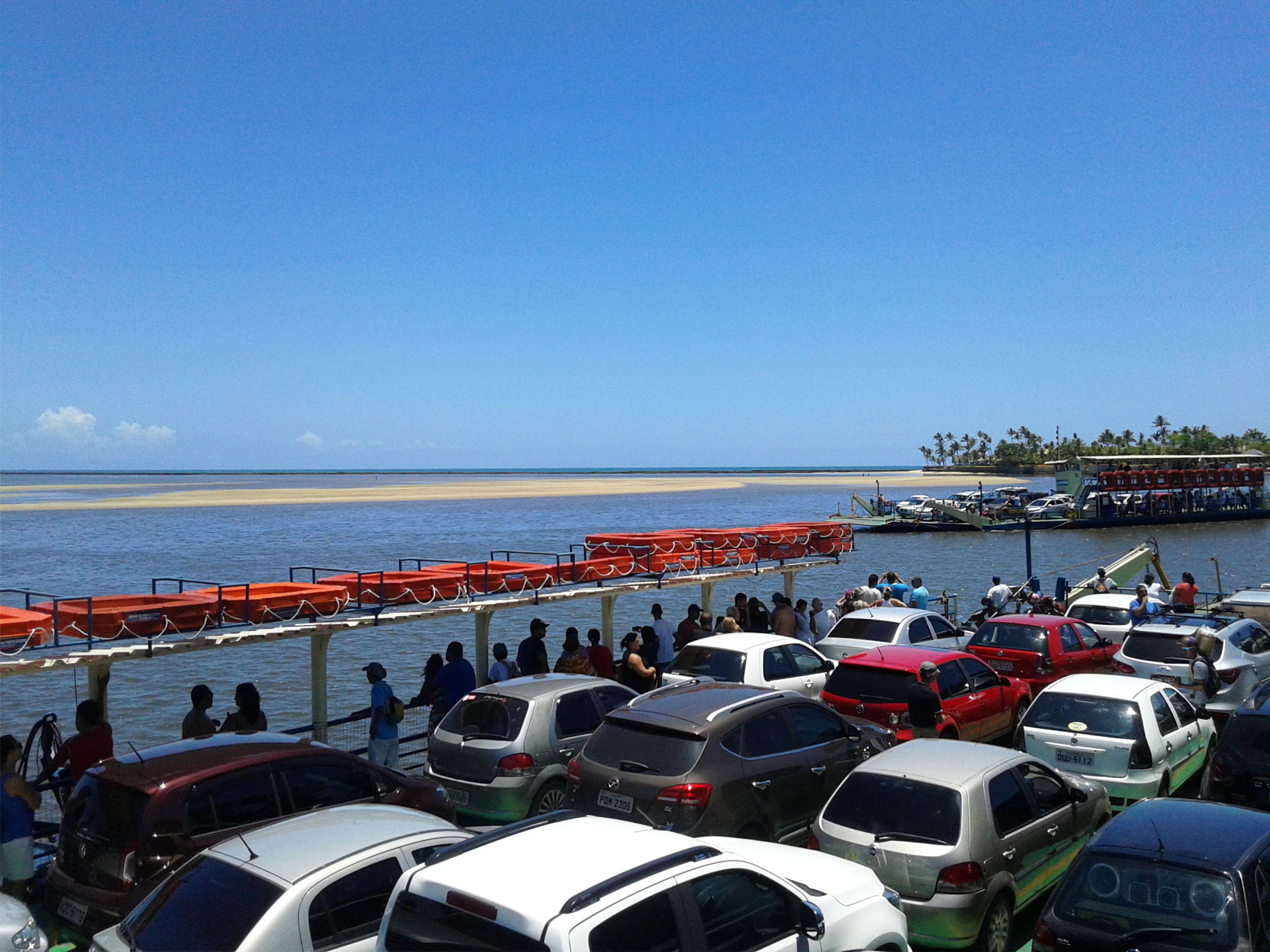
- Ferries in the Buranhém River between Porto Seguro and the Arraial d'Ajuda district

Location
- Country: Brazil

Physical characteristics
- Source
  - location: Bahia state

The Buranhém River - also known as Rio do Peixe - is a watercourse flowing through the states of Minas Gerais (20 km (12 mi)) and Bahia (128 km (80 mi)), in Brazil. It ends its course at the Atlantic Ocean just by the city of Porto Seguro. The city holds a distinctive place in Brazilian history as in 1500 it was the first landing point of Portuguese navigators commanded by Pedro Álvares Cabral, who discovered Brazil.

== See also ==
- List of rivers of Bahia
