= 2007 Fed Cup Americas Zone Group I – Pool A =

International tennis competition

Group A of the 2007 Fed Cup Americas Zone Group I was one of two pools in the Americas Zone Group I of the 2007 Fed Cup. Three teams competed in a round robin competition, with the top team and the bottom two teams proceeding to their respective sections of the play-offs: the top teams played for advancement to the World Group II Play-offs, while the bottom team faced potential relegation to Group II.

		(Brazil) BRA	(Mexico) MEX	(Chile) CHI	RR; W–L	Set; W–L	Game; W–L	Standings
17	Brazil		2–1	1–2	1–1	7–6	60–55	1
27	Mexico	1–2		2–1	1–1	7–7	58–65	2
36	Chile	2–1	1–2		1–1	6–7	58–56	3

== Brazil vs. Chile ==
Brazil
1
Pilara Tenis Club, Buenos Aires, Argentina
18 April 2007
Red clay (outdoors)

Chile
2

			1	2	3
1	(Brazil) (Chile)	Maria Fernanda Alves; Melisa Miranda	5; 7	2; 6
2	(Brazil) (Chile)	Jenifer Widjaja; Andrea Koch-Benvenuto	2; 6	1; 6
3	(Brazil) (Chile)	Larissa Carvalho / Teliana Pereira; Catalina Arancibia / Andrea Koch-Benvenuto	6; 2	6; 4

== Brazil vs. Mexico ==
Brazil
2
Pilara Tenis Club, Buenos Aires, Argentina
19 April 2007
Red clay (outdoors)

Mexico
1

			1	2	3
1	(Brazil) (Mexico)	Teliana Pereira; Daniela Múñoz Gallegos	6; 2	6; 0
2	(Brazil) (Mexico)	Maria Fernanda Alves; Melissa Torres Sandoval	4; 6	7^{7} 6^{4}	3; 6
3	(Brazil) (Mexico)	Larissa Carvalho / Teliana Pereira; Erika Clarke / Daniela Múñoz Gallegos	6; 0	6; 4

== Mexico vs. Chile ==
Mexico
2
Pilara Tenis Club, Buenos Aires, Argentina
20 April 2007
Red clay (outdoors)

Chile
1

			1	2	3
1	(Mexico) (Chile)	Erika Clarke; Melisa Miranda	3; 6	6; 4	1; 6
2	(Mexico) (Chile)	Melissa Torres Sandoval; Andrea Koch-Benvenuto	6; 4	6; 0
3	(Mexico) (Chile)	Erika Clarke / Melissa Torres Sandoval; Andrea Koch-Benvenuto / Melisa Miranda	6; 4	6; 3

== See also ==
- Fed Cup structure
