= 2004 Fed Cup Americas Zone Group II – Pool A =

Group A of the 2004 Fed Cup Americas Zone Group II was one of two pools in the Americas Zone Group II of the 2004 Fed Cup. Four teams competed in a round robin competition, with the top two teams and the bottom two teams proceeding to their respective sections of the play-offs: the top teams play for advancement to the Group I.

		(Jamaica) JAM	(Ecuador) ECU	(Paraguay) PAR	(Guatemala) GUA	RR; W–L	Set; W–L	Game; W–L	Standings
49	Jamaica		2–1	0–3	3–0	2–1	12–8	92–74	2
56	Ecuador	1–2		1–2	3–0	1–2	11–10	100–87	3
63	Paraguay	3–0	2–1		2–1	3–0	15–7	131–86	1
42	Guatemala	0–3	0–3	1–2		0–3	3–16	33–109	4

== Jamaica vs. Guatemala ==
Jamaica
3
Porto Seguro, Bahia, Brazil
20 April 2004
Red clay (outdoors)

Guatemala
0

			1	2	3
1	(Jamaica) (Guatemala)	Megan Moulton-Levy; Luise-Elfride López	6; 2	6; 1
2	(Jamaica) (Guatemala)	Alanna Broderick; Lucía Henkle Gómez	6; 2	6; 1
3	(Jamaica) (Guatemala)	Alanna Broderick / Megan Moulton-Levy; Luise-Elfride López / Saira Sanchinelli	6; 0	6; 4

== Ecuador vs. Paraguay ==
Ecuador
1
Porto Seguro, Bahia, Brazil
20 April 2004
Red clay (outdoors)

Paraguay
2

			1	2	3
1	(Ecuador) (Paraguay)	Pamela Durán Vinueza; Sarah Tami Masi	6; 3	3; 6	4; 6
2	(Ecuador) (Paraguay)	Estefania Balda Álvarez; Larissa Schaerer	2; 6	4; 6
3	(Ecuador) (Paraguay)	Estefania Balda Álvarez / María Teresa Salame; Larissa Schaerer / Sarah Tami Masi	6^{5} 7^{7}	6; 0	6; 4

== Jamaica vs. Paraguay ==
Jamaica
0
Porto Seguro, Bahia, Brazil
21 April 2004
Red clay (outdoors)

Paraguay
3

			1	2	3
1	(Jamaica) (Paraguay)	Megan Moulton-Levy; Sarah Tami Masi	6; 1	2; 6	2; 6
2	(Jamaica) (Paraguay)	Alanna Broderick; Larissa Schaerer	2; 6	2; 6
3	(Jamaica) (Paraguay)	Alanna Broderick / Megan Moulton-Levy; Larissa Schaerer / Sarah Tami Masi	6; 3	1; 6	5; 7

== Ecuador vs. Guatemala ==
Ecuador
3
Porto Seguro, Bahia, Brazil
21 April 2004
Red clay (outdoors)

Guatemala
0

			1	2	3
1	(Ecuador) (Guatemala)	Pamela Durán Vinueza; Luise-Elfride López	6; 1	6; 4
2	(Ecuador) (Guatemala)	Estefania Balda Álvarez; Lucía Henkle Gómez	6; 3	6; 4
3	(Ecuador) (Guatemala)	Estefania Balda Álvarez / María Teresa Salame; Luise-Elfride López / Saira Sanchinelli	6; 1	4; 6	6; 0

== Jamaica vs. Ecuador ==
Jamaica
2
Porto Seguro, Bahia, Brazil
22 April 2004
Red clay (outdoors)

Ecuador
1

			1	2	3
1	(Jamaica) (Ecuador)	Megan Moulton-Levy; Pamela Durán Vinueza	6; 0	6; 1
2	(Jamaica) (Ecuador)	Alanna Broderick; Estefania Balda Álvarez	1; 6	4; 6
3	(Jamaica) (Ecuador)	Alanna Broderick / Megan Moulton-Levy; Estefania Balda Álvarez / María Teresa Salame	6; 4	7^{7} 6^{1}

== Paraguay vs. Guatemala ==
Paraguay
2
Porto Seguro, Bahia, Brazil
22 April 2004
Red clay (outdoors)

Guatemala
1

			1	2	3
1	(Paraguay) (Guatemala)	María Rossana Vega Saguier; Luise-Elfride López	4; 6	4; 6
2	(Paraguay) (Guatemala)	Larissa Schaerer; Lucía Henkle Gómez	6; 1	6; 2
3	(Paraguay) (Guatemala)	Larissa Schaerer / Sarah Tami Masi; Luise-Elfride López / Saira Sanchinelli	6; 3	7; 5

== See also ==
- Fed Cup structure
