= 2004 Fed Cup Americas Zone Group II – Pool B =

Group B of the 2004 Fed Cup Americas Zone Group II was one of two pools in the Americas Zone Group II of the 2004 Fed Cup. Four teams competed in a round robin competition, with the top two teams and the bottom two teams proceeding to their respective sections of the play-offs: the top teams play for advancement to the Group I.

		(Bolivia) BOL	(Venezuela) VEN	(Dominican Republic) DOM	RR; W–L	Set; W–L	Game; W–L	Standings
48	Bolivia		2–1	3–0	2–0	10–3	68–53	1
50	Venezuela	1–2		2–0	1–1	6–4	52–37	2
69	Dominican Republic	0–3	0–2		0–2	1–10	34–64	3

== Bolivia vs. Venezuela ==
Bolivia
2
Porto Seguro, Bahia, Brazil
20 April 2004
Red clay (outdoors)

Venezuela
1

			1	2	3
1	(Bolivia) (Venezuela)	Mónica Hoz De Vila; Paola Iovino	1; 6	3; 6
2	(Bolivia) (Venezuela)	María Fernanda Álvarez Terán; Mariana Muci	6; 4	6; 1
3	(Bolivia) (Venezuela)	María Fernanda Álvarez Terán / Mónica Hoz De Vila; Avel-Romaly Coronado / Paola Iovino	6; 4	7^{7} 6^{4}

== Bolivia vs. Dominican Republic ==
Bolivia
3
Porto Seguro, Bahia, Brazil
21 April 2004
Red clay (outdoors)

Dominican Republic
0

			1	2	3
1	(Bolivia) (Dominican Republic)	Mónica Hoz De Vila; Chandra Capozzi	6; 4	6; 2
2	(Bolivia) (Dominican Republic)	María Fernanda Álvarez Terán; Natalia Báez	6; 4	6; 4
3	(Bolivia) (Dominican Republic)	María Alejandra Claure / Mónica Hoz De Vila; Natalia Báez / Chandra Capozzi	1; 6	6; 0	8; 6

== Venezuela vs. Dominican Republic ==
Venezuela
2
Porto Seguro, Bahia, Brazil
22 April 2004
Red clay (outdoors)

Dominican Republic
0

			1	2	3
1	(Venezuela) (Dominican Republic)	Paola Iovino; Natalia Báez	6; 0	6; 1
2	(Venezuela) (Dominican Republic)	Mariana Muci; Chandra Capozzi	7; 5	6; 2
3	(Venezuela) (Dominican Republic)	Paola Iovino / Mariana Muci; Natalia Báez / Chandra Capozzi				not played

== See also ==
- Fed Cup structure
