= Ingrid Várgas Calvo =

Peruvian tennis player (born 1989)

Ingrid Várgas
- Full name: Ingrid Esperanza Várgas Calvo
- Country (sports): Peru
- Born: 27 December 1989 (age 35); Peru
- Prize money: $32,281

Singles
- Career record: 97–146
- Highest ranking: No. 487 (6 July 2009)

Doubles
- Career record: 27–67
- Career titles: 2 ITF
- Highest ranking: No. 671 (11 June 2012)

Ingrid Esperanza Várgas Calvo (born 27 December 1989) is a Peruvian former tennis player.

In her career, she won two doubles titles on the ITF circuit. On 6 July 2009, she reached her best singles ranking of world No. 487. On 11 June 2012, she peaked at No. 671 in the doubles rankings.

In April 2009, Várgas Calvo played two rubbers for the Peru Fed Cup team with a win-loss record of 1–1.

== ITF finals ==
=== Singles (0–1) ===
Legend $10,000 tournaments	Finals by surface Clay (0–1)

Result	No.	Date	Location	Surface	Opponent	Score
Loss	1.	9 July 2007	Bogotá, Colombia	Clay	(Colombia) Viky Núñez Fuentes	5–7, 2–6

=== Doubles (2–1) ===
Legend $25,000 tournaments $10,000 tournaments	Finals by surface Hard (1–1) Clay (1–0)

Result	No.	Date	Location	Surface	Partner	Opponents	Score
Win	1.	20 June 2011	Zacatecas, Mexico	Hard	(Mexico) Ana Paula de la Peña	(United States) Whitney Jones (United States) Hilary Toole	3–6, 7–5, 6–4
Win	2.	16 April 2012	Arequipa, Peru	Clay	(United States) Erin Clark	(Peru) Patricia Kú Flores (Peru) Katherine Miranda Chang	7–6^{(7–2)}, 7–5
Loss	1.	15 October 2012	Mexico City, Mexico	Hard	(Mexico) Covadonga Muradas	(Mexico) Beatriz Ríos (Colombia) Paula Catalina Robles García	6–1, 2–6, [3–10]

== Fed Cup participation ==
=== Singles (1–1) ===
Edition	Stage	Date	Location	Against	Surface	Opponent	W/L	Score
2009 Fed Cup; Americas Zone Group II	R/R	24 April 2009	Santo Domingo, Dominican Republic	Chile	Hard	(Chile) Melisa Miranda	L	2–6, 4–6
2009 Fed Cup; Americas Zone Group II	R/R	25 April 2009	Santo Domingo, Dominican Republic	Panama	Hard	(Panama) Anabelle Espinosa de Hilton	W	6–3, 7–5
