= 2009 Fed Cup Americas Zone Group I – play-offs =

Tennis competition play-offs

The play-offs of the 2009 Fed Cup Americas Zone Group I were the final stages of the Group I Zonal Competition involving teams from the Americas. Using the positions determined in their pools, the six teams faced off to determine their placing in the 2009 Fed Cup Americas Zone Group I, the top countries of each pool played for first to second, while the bottom two of each pool competed for fifth to eighth. The top team advanced to the World Group II, and the bottom two teams were relegated down to the Group II for the next year.

Placing	Pool A	Pool B
1	Canada	Paraguay
2	Puerto Rico	Colombia
3	Bahamas	Brazil

== Promotion play-offs ==
The top team of each pool was placed against each other in a head-to-head round. The winner of the round advanced to World Group II for next year.

=== Canada vs. Paraguay ===
Canada
3
Uniprix Stadium, Montreal, Canada
7 February 2009
Decoturf II (indoors)

Paraguay
0

			1	2	3
1	(Canada) (Paraguay)	Stéphanie Dubois; Verónica Cepede Royg	6; 0	6; 1
2	(Canada) (Paraguay)	Aleksandra Wozniak; Rossana de los Ríos	6; 1	6; 0
3	(Canada) (Paraguay)	Stéphanie Dubois / Aleksandra Wozniak; Verónica Cepede Royg / Isaura Enrique Aguilar	6; 0	6; 3

== Relegation play-offs ==
The last two placed teams of each pool were drawn against each other in two head-to-head rounds. The losing team was relegated to Group II for the next year.

=== Puerto Rico vs. Brazil ===
Puerto Rico
0
Uniprix Stadium, Montreal, Canada
7 February 2009
Decoturf II (indoors)

Brazil
3

			1	2	3
1	(Puerto Rico) (Brazil)	Monica Puig; Maria Fernanda Alves	2; 6	6; 3	1; 6
2	(Puerto Rico) (Brazil)	Jessica Roland-Rosario; Vivian Segnini	4; 6	0; 6
3	(Puerto Rico) (Brazil)	Rocío Portela / Gabriela Vásquez; Monique Albuquerque / Roxane Vaisemberg	0; 6	0; 6

=== Bahamas vs. Colombia ===
Bahamas
0
Uniprix Stadium, Montreal, Canada
7 February 2009
Decoturf II (indoors)

Colombia
3

			1	2	3
1	(The Bahamas) (Colombia)	Kerrie Cartwright; Viky Núñez Fuentes	3; 6	2; 6
2	(The Bahamas) (Colombia)	Nikkita Fountain; Mariana Duque Mariño	2; 6	1; 6
3	(The Bahamas) (Colombia)	Nikkita Fountain / Larikah Russell; Yuliana Lizarazo / Viky Núñez Fuentes	1; 2			retired

== Final Placements ==
Placing	Teams
Promoted	Canada
Second	Paraguay
Third	Brazil
Third	Colombia
Relegated	Puerto Rico
Relegated	Bahamas

- Canada advanced to the World Group II play-offs, and were drawn against Belgium. They lost 2–3, and thus they were relegated back to Group I for 2010.
- Puerto Rico and Bahamas were relegated down to Americas Zone Group II for the next year.

== See also ==
- Fed Cup structure
