= 2008 Fed Cup Americas Zone Group I – Pool A =

International tennis competition

Group A of the 2008 Fed Cup Americas Zone Group I was one of two pools in the Americas Zone Group I of the 2008 Fed Cup. Four teams competed in a round robin competition, with the top team and the bottom two teams proceeding to their respective sections of the play-offs: the top teams played for advancement to the World Group II Play-offs, while the bottom teams faced potential relegation to Group II.

		(Puerto Rico) PUR	(Brazil) BRA	(Uruguay) URU	(Paraguay) PAR	RR; W–L	Set; W–L	Game; W–L	Standings
25	Puerto Rico		1–2	3–0	3–0	2–1	14–6	103–72	2
26	Brazil	2–1		2–1	3–0	3–0	15–5	112–60	1
45	Uruguay	0–3	1–2		0–3	1–2	3–16	67–109	4
47	Paraguay	0–3	0–3	3–0		0–3	8–13	62–103	3

== Puerto Rico vs. Paraguay ==
Puerto Rico
3
Club Deportivo El Rodeo, Medellín, Colombia
30 January 2008
Red clay (outdoors)

Paraguay
0

			1	2	3
1	(Puerto Rico) (Paraguay)	Jessica Roland-Rosario; Adriana Pereira	7^{7} 6^{4}	4; 6	6; 3
2	(Puerto Rico) (Paraguay)	Vilmarie Castellvi; Rossana de los Ríos	7; 5	6; 3
3	(Puerto Rico) (Paraguay)	Paola Calderón / Monica Puig; María Angela Ferreira / Adriana Pereira	6; 0	6; 1

== Brazil vs. Uruguay ==
Brazil
2
Club Deportivo El Rodeo, Medellín, Colombia
30 January 2008
Red clay (outdoors)

Uruguay
1

			1	2	3
1	(Brazil) (Uruguay)	Maria Fernanda Alves; Leticia Demichelli	5; 7	6^{5} 7^{7}
2	(Brazil) (Uruguay)	Teliana Pereira; María Eugenia Roca Recarey	6; 0	6; 0
3	(Brazil) (Uruguay)	Maria Fernanda Alves / Teliana Pereira; Leticia Demichelli / María Eugenia Roca Recarey	6; 1	6; 0

== Puerto Rico vs. Uruguay ==
Puerto Rico
3
Club Deportivo El Rodeo, Medellín, Colombia
31 January 2008
Red clay (outdoors)

Uruguay
0

			1	2	3
1	(Puerto Rico) (Uruguay)	Jessica Roland-Rosario; Leticia Demichelli	6; 1	6; 3
2	(Puerto Rico) (Uruguay)	Vilmarie Castellvi; María Eugenia Roca Recarey	6; 3	6; 0
3	(Puerto Rico) (Uruguay)	Vilmarie Castellvi / Jessica Roland-Rosario; Leticia Demichelli / María Eugenia Torres	6; 2	6; 2

== Brazil vs. Paraguay ==
Brazil
3
Club Deportivo El Rodeo, Medellín, Colombia
31 January 2008
Red clay (outdoors)

Paraguay
0

			1	2	3
1	(Brazil) (Paraguay)	Maria Fernanda Alves; Adriana Pereira	6; 4	6; 0
2	(Brazil) (Paraguay)	Teliana Pereira; Rossana de los Ríos	4; 6	6; 4	6; 3
3	(Brazil) (Paraguay)	Maria Fernanda Alves / Ana-Clara Duarte; María Angela Ferreira / Adriana Pereira	6; 3	6; 0

== Puerto Rico vs. Brazil ==
Puerto Rico
1
Club Deportivo El Rodeo, Medellín, Colombia
1 February 2008
Red clay (outdoors)

Brazil
2

			1	2	3
1	(Puerto Rico) (Brazil)	Jessica Roland-Rosario; Maria Fernanda Alves	6; 4	2; 6	6; 3
2	(Puerto Rico) (Brazil)	Vilmarie Castellvi; Teliana Pereira	4; 6	0; 6
3	(Puerto Rico) (Brazil)	Vilmarie Castellvi / Jessica Roland-Rosario; Maria Fernanda Alves / Teliana Pereira	4; 6	3; 6

== Uruguay vs. Paraguay ==
Uruguay
0
Club Deportivo El Rodeo, Medellín, Colombia
1 February 2008
Red clay (outdoors)

Paraguay
3

			1	2	3
1	(Uruguay) (Paraguay)	Leticia Demichelli; Adriana Pereira	6; 2	2; 6	4; 6
2	(Uruguay) (Paraguay)	María Eugenia Roca Recarey; Rossana de los Ríos	1; 6	1; 6
3	(Uruguay) (Paraguay)	Leticia Demichelli / María Eugenia Torres; Rossana de los Ríos / Adriana Pereira	3; 6	4; 6

== See also ==
- Fed Cup structure
