= Arraial d'Ajuda =

District in the municipality of Porto Seguro, Bahia, Brazil

Coordinates: 16°28′30″S 39°04′08″W

Arraial d'Ajuda is a district in the municipality of Porto Seguro, Bahia, Brazil. The city is known for its beaches and its architecture that make it a destination for tourism, which is the main economic activity of the district. Arraial d'Ajuda is connected to Porto Seguro by a ferry boat crossing the mouth of the Buranhém River on the BA-986 state road.

== History ==
The city was originally named Arraial de Nossa Senhora d'Ajuda as a tribute to Saint Padroeira.

Arraial d'Ajuda was home for one of the first airfield of Brazil. The "aviation field" (campo de aviação) of Arraial d'Ajuda was dedicated in 1939. This facility was closed in 1982 after the new commercial airport of Porto Seguro was opened. Central Park (Parque Central) sits on the site of the former airfield. The Manoel Crescêncio Santiago street lies on the former crosswind runway. It was named after one of the guards appointed by the then Department of Civil Aviation (DAC).

== Gallery ==
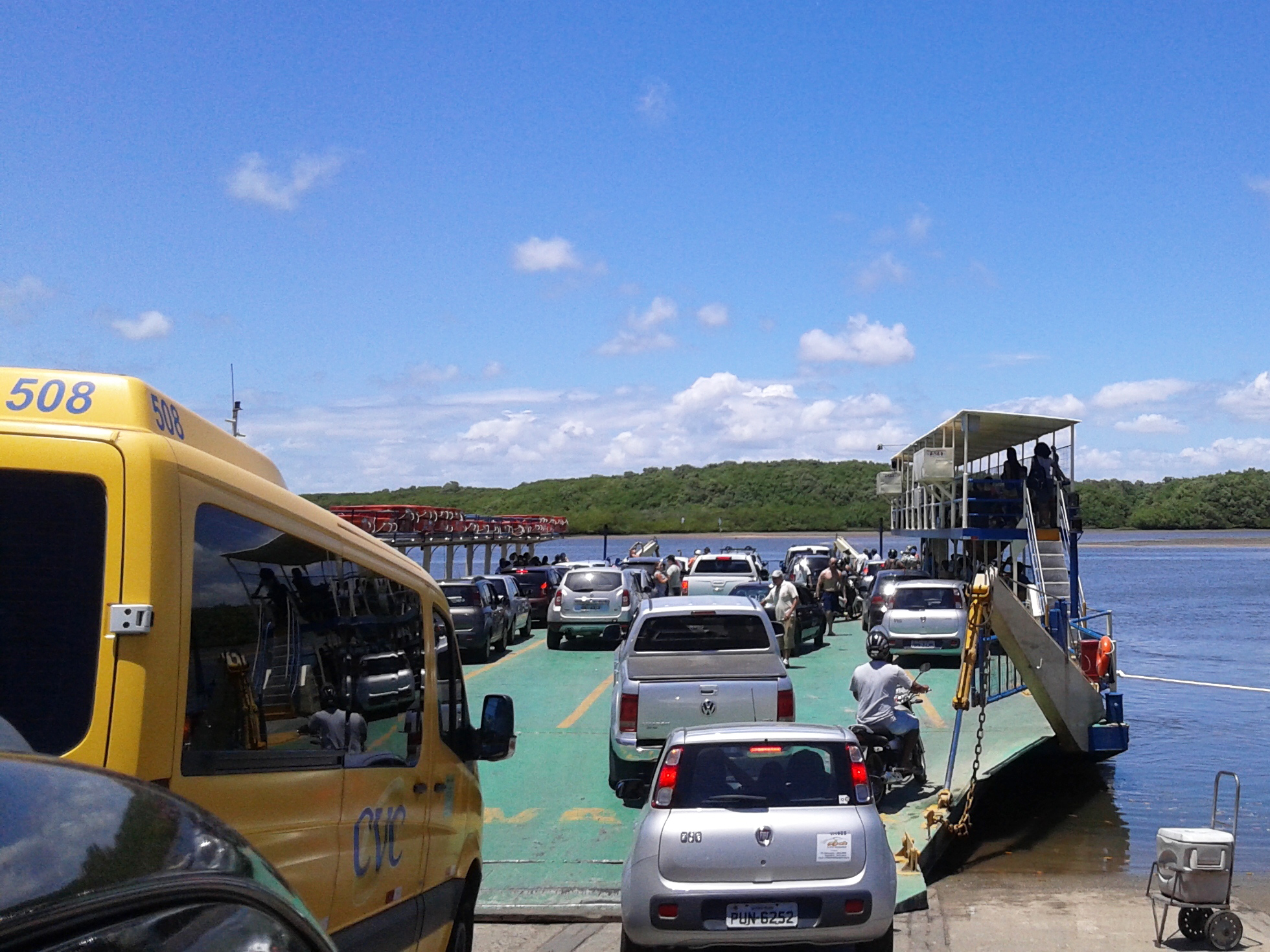
Entrance to the ferry in the Buranhém River between the Arraial d'Ajuda district and Porto Seguro.

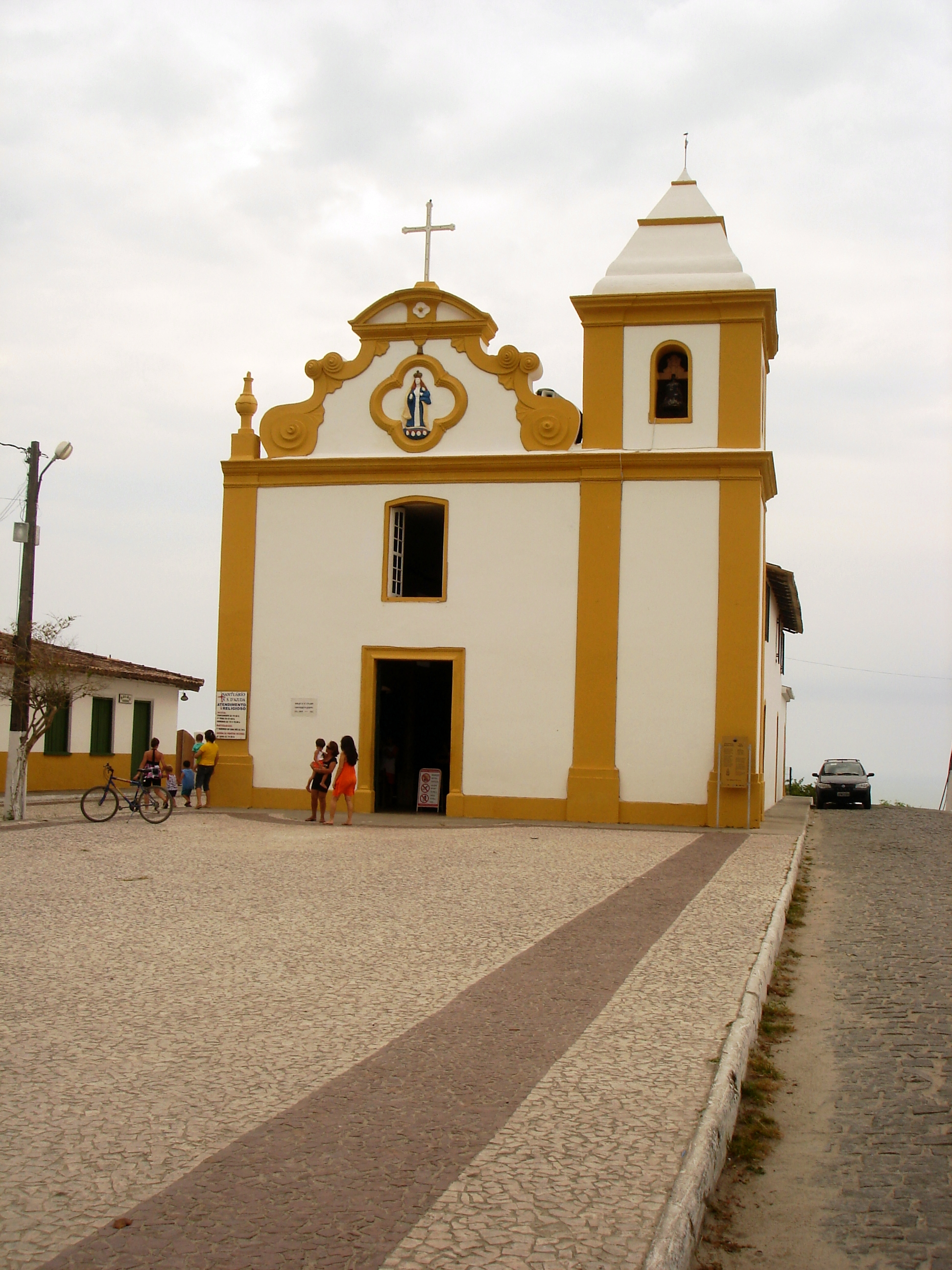
Our Lady of Help Church.

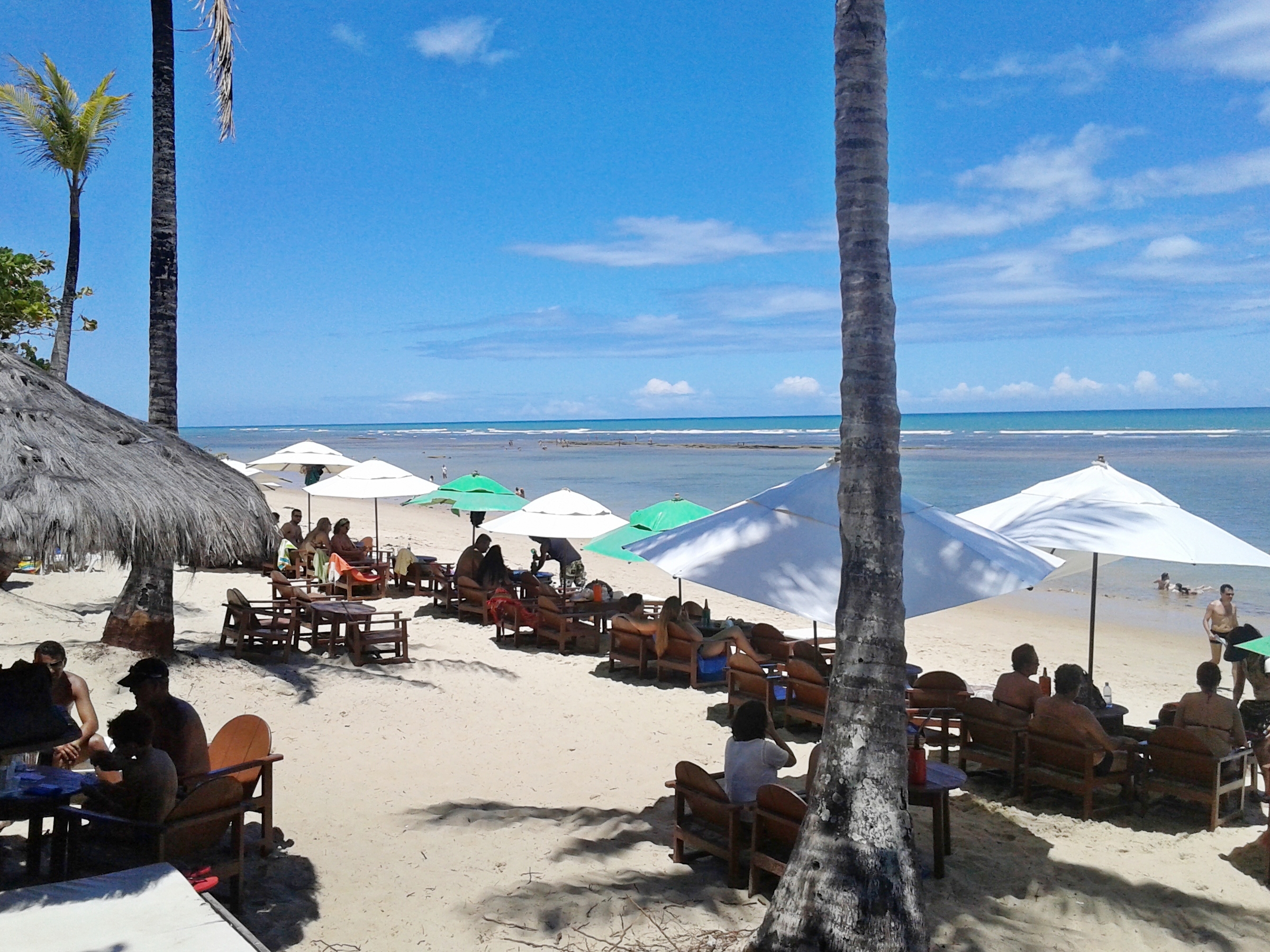
Mucugê beach.
