= 2009 Fed Cup Americas Zone Group II – Pool A =

Group A of the 2009 Fed Cup Europe/Africa Zone Group II was one of two pools in Group II of the Americas zone of the 2009 Fed Cup. Four teams competed in a round robin competition, with the top team advancing to Group I for 2010.

		(Chile) CHI	(Mexico) MEX	(Panama) PAN	(Peru) PER	RR; W–L	Set; W–L	Game; W–L	Standings
50	Chile		2–1	3–0	1–2	2–1	13–7	106–66	1
59	Mexico	1–2		3–0	2–1	2–1	13–7	101–74	2
80	Panama	0–3	0–3		0–3	0–3	0–18	21–109	4
	Peru	2–1	1–2	3–0		2–1	13–7	102–81	3

== Chile vs. Panama ==
Chile
3
Parque del Este, Santo Domingo, Dominican Republic
23 April 2009
Plexipave (outdoors)

Panama
0

			1	2	3
1	(Chile) (Panama)	Andrea Koch-Benvenuto; Alma Michelle Espinosa Rodríguez	6; 1	6; 0
2	(Chile) (Panama)	Melisa Miranda; Anabelle Michelle Espinosa de Hilton	6; 0	6; 0
3	(Chile) (Panama)	Andrea Koch-Benvenuto / Melisa Miranda; Rosaline Zafir Chávez Tello / Anabelle Michelle Espinosa de Hilton	6; 0	6; 1

== Mexico vs. Peru ==
Mexico
2
Parque del Este, Santo Domingo, Dominican Republic
23 April 2009
Plexipave (outdoors)

Peru
1

			1	2	3
1	(Mexico) (Peru)	Ximena Hermoso; Claudia Razzeto	6; 3	6; 1
2	(Mexico) (Peru)	Daniela Múñoz Gallegos; Bianca Botto	3; 6	1; 6
3	(Mexico) (Peru)	Ximena Hermoso / Daniela Múñoz Gallegos; Bianca Botto / Claudia Razzeto	6^{6} 7^{8}	6; 3	7; 5

== Chile vs. Peru ==
Chile
1
Parque del Este, Santo Domingo, Dominican Republic
24 April 2009
Plexipave (outdoors)

Peru
2

			1	2	3
1	(Chile) (Peru)	Andrea Koch-Benvenuto; Bianca Botto	4; 6	6^{3} 7^{7}
2	(Chile) (Peru)	Melisa Miranda; Ingrid Várgas Calvo	6; 2	6; 4
3	(Chile) (Peru)	Andrea Koch-Benvenuto / Melisa Miranda; Bianca Botto / Claudia Razzeto	3; 6	6; 3	3; 6

== Mexico vs. Panama ==
Mexico
3
Parque del Este, Santo Domingo, Dominican Republic
24 April 2009
Plexipave (outdoors)

Panama
0

			1	2	3
1	(Mexico) (Panama)	Alejandra Granillo; Rosaline Zafir Chávez Tello	6; 0	6; 0
2	(Mexico) (Panama)	Ximena Hermoso; Anabelle Michelle Espinosa de Hilton	6; 2	6; 2
3	(Mexico) (Panama)	Laura-Alicia Aguilar / Alejandra Granillo; Rosaline Zafir Chávez Tello / Alma Michelle Espinosa Rodríguez	6; 2	6; 1

== Chile vs. Mexico ==
Chile
2
Parque del Este, Santo Domingo, Dominican Republic
25 April 2009
Plexipave (outdoors)

Mexico
1

			1	2	3
1	(Chile) (Mexico)	Andrea Koch-Benvenuto; Alejandra Granillo	4; 6	6; 2	6; 3
2	(Chile) (Mexico)	Melisa Miranda; Daniela Múñoz Gallegos	6; 3	6; 3
3	(Chile) (Mexico)	Andrea Koch-Benvenuto / Melisa Miranda; Ximena Hermoso / Daniela Múñoz Gallegos	6^{1} 7^{7}	2; 6

== Panama vs. Peru ==
Panama
0
Parque del Este, Santo Domingo, Dominican Republic
25 April 2009
Plexipave (outdoors)

Peru
3

			1	2	3
1	(Panama) (Peru)	Alma Michelle Espinosa Rodríguez; Bianca Botto	0; 6	0; 6
2	(Panama) (Peru)	Anabelle Michelle Espinosa de Hilton; Ingrid Várgas Calvo	3; 6	5; 7
3	(Panama) (Peru)	Anabelle Michelle Espinosa de Hilton / Alma Michelle Espinosa Rodríguez; Bianca Botto / Claudia Razzeto	1; 6	3; 6

- Chile placed first in this group and thus advanced to Group I for 2010, where they placed fifth overall.

== See also ==
- Fed Cup structure
