= 2008 Fed Cup Americas Zone Group II – Pool B =

Group B of the 2008 Fed Cup Americas Zone Group II was one of four pools in the Americas Zone Group II of the 2008 Fed Cup. Four teams competed in a round robin competition, with each team proceeding to their respective sections of the play-offs: the top team played for advancement to Group I.

		(Bolivia) BOL	(Ecuador) ECU	(Honduras) HON	RR; W–L	Set; W–L	Game; W–L	Standings
58	Bolivia		3–0	3–0	2–0	12–0	74–23	1
68	Ecuador	0–3		3–0	1–1	6–6	52–43	2
87	Honduras	0–3	0–3		0–2	0–12	12–72	3

== Bolivia vs. Honduras ==
Bolivia
3
Country Club Cochabamba, Cochabamba, Bolivia
23 April 2008
Red clay (outdoors)

Honduras
0

			1	2	3
1	(Bolivia) (Honduras)	María Paula Deheza; Marisela Avilés	6; 1	6; 1
2	(Bolivia) (Honduras)	Daniela Trigo; Zulema Zelaya	6; 1	6; 1
3	(Bolivia) (Honduras)	María Paula Deheza / Diana Kyllmann; Marisela Avilés / Zulema Zelaya	6; 1	6; 2

== Ecuador vs. Honduras ==
Ecuador
3
Country Club Cochabamba, Cochabamba, Bolivia
24 April 2008
Red clay (outdoors)

Honduras
0

			1	2	3
1	(Ecuador) (Honduras)	Marie Elise Casares; Marisela Avilés	6; 0	6; 2
2	(Ecuador) (Honduras)	Lorena Avilés; Zulema Zelaya	6; 0	6; 0
3	(Ecuador) (Honduras)	Claudia Hidalgo / Gisella Pere; Marisela Avilés / Leyla Taracena	6; 3	6; 0

== Bolivia vs. Ecuador ==
Bolivia
3
Country Club Cochabamba, Cochabamba, Bolivia
25 April 2008
Red clay (outdoors)

Ecuador
0

			1	2	3
1	(Bolivia) (Ecuador)	María Paula Deheza; Gisella Pere	7; 5	6; 0
2	(Bolivia) (Ecuador)	Daniela Trigo; Marie Elise Casares	6; 1	6; 0
3	(Bolivia) (Ecuador)	Claudia Herbas / Diana Kyllmann; Lorena Avilés / Claudia Hidalgo	7^{7} 6^{4}	6; 4

== See also ==
- Fed Cup structure
