= 2007 Fed Cup Americas Zone Group I – Pool B =

International tennis competition

Group B of the 2007 Fed Cup Americas Zone Group I was one of two pools in the Americas Zone Group I of the 2007 Fed Cup. Three teams competed in a round robin competition, with the top team and the bottom two teams proceeding to their respective sections of the play-offs: the top teams played for advancement to the World Group II Play-offs, while the bottom team faced potential relegation to Group II.

		(Puerto Rico) PUR	(Argentina) ARG	(Colombia) COL	(Dominican Republic) DOM	RR; W–L	Set; W–L	Game; W–L	Standings
21	Puerto Rico		0–3	0–3	3–0	1–2	8–12	77–85	3
32	Argentina	3–0		3–0	3–0	3–0	18–0	111–35	1
43	Colombia	3–0	0–3		3–0	2–1	12–8	103–68	2
50	Dominican Republic	0–3	0–3	0–3		0–3	0–18	5–108	4

== Puerto Rico vs. Colombia ==
Puerto Rico
0
Pilara Tenis Club, Buenos Aires, Argentina
18 April 2007
Red clay (outdoors)

Colombia
3

			1	2	3
1	(Puerto Rico) (Colombia)	Vilmarie Castellvi; Mariana Duque Mariño	7; 5	4; 6	4; 6
2	(Puerto Rico) (Colombia)	Kristina Brandi; Catalina Castaño	1; 6	1; 6
3	(Puerto Rico) (Colombia)	Vilmarie Castellvi / Jessica Roland-Rosario; Karen Castiblanco / Viky Núñez Fuentes	6; 4	1; 6	4; 6

== Argentina vs. Dominican Republic ==
Argentina
3
Pilara Tenis Club, Buenos Aires, Argentina
18 April 2007
Red clay (outdoors)

Dominican Republic
0

			1	2	3
1	(Argentina) (Dominican Republic)	Jorgelina Cravero; Leyla Esther Cabrera	6; 0	6; 0
2	(Argentina) (Dominican Republic)	Gisela Dulko; Katherine Hoepelman	6; 0	6; 0
3	(Argentina) (Dominican Republic)	María José Argeri / Mariana Díaz Oliva; Pamela Adóm Méndez / Leyla Esther Cabrera	6; 0	6; 0

== Puerto Rico vs. Argentina ==
Puerto Rico
0
Pilara Tenis Club, Buenos Aires, Argentina
19 April 2007
Red clay (outdoors)

Argentina
3

			1	2	3
1	(Puerto Rico) (Argentina)	Vilmarie Castellvi; Jorgelina Cravero	0; 6	2; 6
2	(Puerto Rico) (Argentina)	Kristina Brandi; Gisela Dulko	5; 7	1; 6
3	(Puerto Rico) (Argentina)	Natalia Guevara / Jessica Roland-Rosario; María José Argeri / Mariana Díaz Oliva	2; 6	3; 6

== Colombia vs. Dominican Republic ==
Colombia
3
Pilara Tenis Club, Buenos Aires, Argentina
19 April 2007
Red clay (outdoors)

Dominican Republic
0

			1	2	3
1	(Colombia) (Dominican Republic)	Mariana Duque Mariño; Leyla Esther Cabrera	6; 0	6; 0
2	(Colombia) (Dominican Republic)	Catalina Castaño; Pamela Adóm Méndez	6; 1	6; 0
3	(Colombia) (Dominican Republic)	Karen Castiblanco / Viky Núñez Fuentes; Leyla Esther Cabrera / Katherine Hoepelman	6; 1	6; 0

== Puerto Rico vs. Dominican Republic ==
Puerto Rico
3
Pilara Tenis Club, Buenos Aires, Argentina
20 April 2007
Red clay (outdoors)

Dominican Republic
0

			1	2	3
1	(Puerto Rico) (Dominican Republic)	Jessica Roland-Rosario; Pamela Adóm Méndez	6; 1	6; 0
2	(Puerto Rico) (Dominican Republic)	Kristina Brandi; Katherine Hoepelman	6; 0	6; 1
3	(Puerto Rico) (Dominican Republic)	Natalia Guevara / Jessica Roland-Rosario; Pamela Adóm Méndez / Leyla Esther Cabrera	6; 1	6; 0

== Argentina vs. Colombia ==
Argentina
3
Pilara Tenis Club, Buenos Aires, Argentina
20 April 2007
Red clay (outdoors)

Colombia
0

			1	2	3
1	(Argentina) (Colombia)	Jorgelina Cravero; Mariana Duque Mariño	7^{7} 6^{3}	6; 2
2	(Argentina) (Colombia)	Gisela Dulko; Catalina Castaño	7; 5	6; 4
3	(Argentina) (Colombia)	María José Argeri / Mariana Díaz Oliva; Karen Castiblanco / Viky Núñez Fuentes	6; 4	6; 1

== See also ==
- Fed Cup structure
