= 2008 Fed Cup Americas Zone Group I – Pool B =

Group B of the 2008 Fed Cup Americas Zone Group I was one of two pools in the Americas Zone Group I of the 2008 Fed Cup. Four teams competed in a round robin competition, with the top team and the bottom two teams proceeding to their respective sections of the play-offs: the top teams played for advancement to the World Group II Play-offs, while the bottom teams faced potential relegation to Group II.

		(Canada) CAN	(Colombia) COL	(Mexico) MEX	RR; W–L	Set; W–L	Game; W–L	Standings
16	Canada		1–2	3–0	1–1	9–4	67–42	2
32	Colombia	2–1		3–0	2–0	10–4	74–50	1
38	Mexico	0–3	0–3		0–2	1–12	30–79	3

== Colombia vs. Mexico ==
Colombia
3
Club Deportivo El Rodeo, Medellín, Colombia
30 January 2008
Red clay (outdoors)

Mexico
0

			1	2	3
1	(Colombia) (Mexico)	Mariana Duque Mariño; Valeria Pulido	6^{5} 7^{7}	6; 2	6; 2
2	(Colombia) (Mexico)	Catalina Castaño; Daniela Múñoz Gallegos	6; 1	6; 2
3	(Colombia) (Mexico)	Catalina Castaño / Mariana Duque Mariño; Lorena Arias / Erika Clarke	6; 0	7; 5

== Canada vs. Mexico ==
Canada
3
Club Deportivo El Rodeo, Medellín, Colombia
31 January 2008
Red clay (outdoors)

Mexico
0

			1	2	3
1	(Canada) (Mexico)	Aleksandra Wozniak; Valeria Pulido	6; 2	6; 4
2	(Canada) (Mexico)	Stéphanie Dubois; Daniela Múñoz Gallegos	6; 1	6; 1
3	(Canada) (Mexico)	Stéphanie Dubois / Marie-Ève Pelletier; Lorena Arias / Valeria Pulido	6; 2	6; 1

== Canada vs. Colombia ==
Canada
1
Club Deportivo El Rodeo, Medellín, Colombia
31 January 2008
Red clay (outdoors)

Colombia
2

			1	2	3
1	(Canada) (Colombia)	Aleksandra Wozniak; Mariana Duque Mariño	6; 1	6; 2
2	(Canada) (Colombia)	Stéphanie Dubois; Catalina Castaño	2; 6	4; 6
3	(Canada) (Colombia)	Stéphanie Dubois / Marie-Ève Pelletier; Catalina Castaño / Mariana Duque Mariño	3; 6	6; 4	4; 6

== See also ==
- Fed Cup structure
