= 2007 Fed Cup Americas Zone Group II – Pool A =

Tennis Competition Pool

Group A of the 2007 Fed Cup Americas Zone Group II was one of two pools in the Americas Zone Group II of the 2007 Fed Cup. Five teams competed in a round robin competition, with the teams proceeding to their respective sections of the play-offs: the top two teams played for advancement to the 2008 Group I.

		(Uruguay) URU	(Ecuador) ECU	(Bermuda) BER	(Honduras) HON	RR; W–L	Set; W–L	Game; W–L	Standings
48	Uruguay		2–1	3–0	3–0	3–0	16–3	104–27	1
70	Ecuador	1–2		3–0	3–0	2–1	14–4	87–43	2
75	Bermuda	0–3	0–3		2–1	1–2	5–15	52–105	3
	Honduras	0–3	0–3	1–2		0–3	3–16	37–105	4

== Uruguay vs. Honduras ==
Uruguay
3
Carrasco Lawn Tennis Club, Montevideo, Uruguay
16 April 2007
Red clay (outdoors)

Honduras
0

			1	2	3
1	(Uruguay) (Honduras)	María José Arechavaleta; Sofía Barletta	6; 1	6; 0
2	(Uruguay) (Honduras)	Estefanía Craciun; Marisela Avilés	6; 1	6; 0
3	(Uruguay) (Honduras)	Leticia Demichelli / María Eugenia Torres; María de los Ángeles Cárdenas / Zulema Zelaya	6; 0	6; 0

== Ecuador vs. Bermuda ==
Ecuador
3
Carrasco Lawn Tennis Club, Montevideo, Uruguay
16 April 2007
Red clay (outdoors)

Bermuda
0

			1	2	3
1	(Ecuador) (Bermuda)	Claudia Hidalgo; Jacklyn Lambert	6; 2	6; 0
2	(Ecuador) (Bermuda)	Claudine Paulson; Ashley Brooks	6; 2	6; 3
3	(Ecuador) (Bermuda)	Lorena Avilés / Claudine Paulson; Caitlin Gordon / Jacklyn Lambert	6; 2	6; 0

== Uruguay vs. Ecuador ==
Uruguay
2
Carrasco Lawn Tennis Club, Montevideo, Uruguay
18 April 2007
Red clay (outdoors)

Ecuador
1

			1	2	3
1	(Uruguay) (Ecuador)	María José Arechavaleta; Lorena Avilés	6; 0	6; 3
2	(Uruguay) (Ecuador)	Estefanía Craciun; Claudine Paulson	6; 0	6; 0
3	(Uruguay) (Ecuador)	Estefanía Craciun / Leticia Demichelli; Claudia Hidalgo / Claudine Paulson	4; 6	1; 6

== Bermuda vs. Honduras ==
Bermuda
2
Carrasco Lawn Tennis Club, Montevideo, Uruguay
18 April 2007
Red clay (outdoors)

Honduras
1

			1	2	3
1	(Bermuda) (Honduras)	Jacklyn Lambert; María de los Ángeles Cárdenas	6; 0	6; 4
2	(Bermuda) (Honduras)	Ashley Brooks; Zulema Zelaya	3; 6	6; 4	6; 4
3	(Bermuda) (Honduras)	Caitlin Gordon / Jacklyn Lambert; Marisela Avilés / Sofía Barletta	4; 6	2; 6

== Uruguay vs. Bermuda ==
Uruguay
3
Carrasco Lawn Tennis Club, Montevideo, Uruguay
20 April 2007
Red clay (outdoors)

Bermuda
0

			1	2	3
1	(Uruguay) (Bermuda)	María Eugenia Torres; Jacklyn Lambert	6; 0	6; 0
2	(Uruguay) (Bermuda)	Estefanía Craciun; Ashley Brooks	6; 0	6; 1
3	(Uruguay) (Bermuda)	María José Arechavaleta / Leticia Demichelli; Ashley Brooks / Jacklyn Lambert	6; 2	3; 6	6; 1

== Ecuador vs. Honduras ==
Ecuador
3
Carrasco Lawn Tennis Club, Montevideo, Uruguay
20 April 2007
Red clay (outdoors)

Honduras
0

			1	2	3
1	(Ecuador) (Honduras)	Claudia Hidalgo; Zulema Zelaya	6; 1	6; 0
2	(Ecuador) (Honduras)	Lorena Avilés; Marisela Avilés	6; 0	6; 0
3	(Ecuador) (Honduras)	Lorena Avilés / Claudine Paulson; Sofía Barletta / Zulema Zelaya	6; 3	6; 1

== See also ==
- Fed Cup structure
