= 2008 Fed Cup Americas Zone Group II – Pool D =

Group D of the 2008 Fed Cup Americas Zone Group I was one of four pools in the Americas Zone Group II of the 2008 Fed Cup. Four teams competed in a round robin competition, with each team proceeding to their respective sections of the play-offs: the top team played for advancement to Group I.

		(The Bahamas) BAH	(Dominican Republic) DOM	(Bermuda) BER	(Trinidad and Tobago) TRI	RR; W–L	Set; W–L	Game; W–L	Standings
47	Bahamas		3–0	3–0	2–1	3–0	16–3	112–45	1
59	Dominican Republic	0–3		3–0	3–0	2–1	13–6	98–68	2
72	Bermuda	0–3	0–3		0–3	0–3	1–18	36–114	4
74	Trinidad and Tobago	1–2	0–3	3–0		1–2	8–11	78–97	3

== Bahamas vs. Dominican Republic ==
Bahamas
3
Country Club Cochabamba, Cochabamba, Bolivia
23 April 2008
Red clay (outdoors)

Dominican Republic
0

			1	2	3
1	(The Bahamas) (Dominican Republic)	Nikkita Fountain; Natalia Báez	4; 6	6; 4	6; 0
2	(The Bahamas) (Dominican Republic)	Larikah Russell; Francesca Segarelli	7; 5	6; 3
3	(The Bahamas) (Dominican Republic)	Nikkita Fountain / Larikah Russell; Natalia Báez / Francesca Segarelli	6; 1	7^{7} 6^{1}

== Bermuda vs. Trinidad and Tobago ==
Bermuda
0
Country Club Cochabamba, Cochabamba, Bolivia
23 April 2008
Red clay (outdoors)

Trinidad and Tobago
3

			1	2	3
1	(Bermuda) (Trinidad and Tobago)	Jacklyn Lambert; Raye-Ann Sandy	3; 6	0; 6
2	(Bermuda) (Trinidad and Tobago)	Ashley Brooks; Carlista Mohammed	4; 6	5; 7
3	(Bermuda) (Trinidad and Tobago)	Ashley Brooks / Tara Lambert; Lee-Anne Lingo / Carlista Mohammed	2; 6	6; 4	6^{2} 7^{7}

== Bahamas vs. Bermuda ==
Bahamas
3
Country Club Cochabamba, Cochabamba, Bolivia
24 April 2008
Red clay (outdoors)

Bermuda
0

			1	2	3
1	(The Bahamas) (Bermuda)	Nikkita Fountain; Caitlin Gordon	6; 0	6; 2
2	(The Bahamas) (Bermuda)	Larikah Russell; Ashley Brooks	6; 0	6; 0
3	(The Bahamas) (Bermuda)	Kerrie Cartwright / Elanqua Griffin; Jacklyn Lambert / Tara Lambert	6; 1	6; 0

== Dominican Republic vs. Trinidad and Tobago ==
Dominican Republic
3
Country Club Cochabamba, Cochabamba, Bolivia
24 April 2008
Red clay (outdoors)

Trinidad and Tobago
0

			1	2	3
1	(Dominican Republic) (Trinidad and Tobago)	Natalia Báez; Raye-Ann Sandy	6; 1	6; 2
2	(Dominican Republic) (Trinidad and Tobago)	Francesca Segarelli; Carlista Mohammed	6; 2	6; 4
3	(Dominican Republic) (Trinidad and Tobago)	Natalia Báez / Luisanna Rodríguez; Carlista Mohammed / Raye-Ann Sandy	7^{7} 6^{5}	6; 4

== Bahamas vs. Trinidad and Tobago ==
Bahamas
2
Country Club Cochabamba, Cochabamba, Bolivia
25 April 2008
Red clay (outdoors)

Trinidad and Tobago
1

			1	2	3
1	(The Bahamas) (Trinidad and Tobago)	Nikkita Fountain; Lee-Anne Lingo	6; 1	6; 1
2	(The Bahamas) (Trinidad and Tobago)	Larikah Russell; Raye-Ann Sandy	6; 0	6; 2
3	(The Bahamas) (Trinidad and Tobago)	Kerrie Cartwright / Elanqua Griffin; Carlista Mohammed / Raye-Ann Sandy	6^{5} 7^{7}	4; 6

== Dominican Republic vs. Bermuda ==
Dominican Republic
3
Country Club Cochabamba, Cochabamba, Bolivia
25 April 2008
Red clay (outdoors)

Bermuda
0

			1	2	3
1	(Dominican Republic) (Bermuda)	Natalia Báez; Caitlin Gordon	6; 2	6; 0
2	(Dominican Republic) (Bermuda)	Francesca Segarelli; Jacklyn Lambert	6; 1	6; 1
3	(Dominican Republic) (Bermuda)	Natalia Báez / Luisanna Rodríguez; Jacklyn Lambert / Tara Lambert	6; 1	6; 0

== See also ==
- Fed Cup structure
