= 2007 Fed Cup Americas Zone Group II – Pool B =

International tennis competition

Group B of the 2007 Fed Cup Americas Zone Group II was one of two pools in the Americas Zone Group II of the 2007 Fed Cup. Five teams competed in a round robin competition, with the teams proceeding to their respective sections of the play-offs: the top two teams played for advancement to the 2008 Group I.

		(Bolivia) BOL	(Paraguay) PAR	(Guatemala) GUA	(Trinidad and Tobago) TRI	(Barbados) BAR	Match; W–L	Set; W–L	Game; W–L	Standings
54	Bolivia		1–2	2–1	2–1	3–0	3–1	18–9	133–83	2
57	Paraguay	2–1		2–1	3–0	3–0	4–0	21–6	151–78	1
82	Guatemala	1–2	1–2		3–0	3–0	2–2	16–9	113–92	3
89	Trinidad and Tobago	1–2	0–3	0–3		3–0	1–3	10–15	102–128	4
	Barbados	0–3	0–3	0–3	0–3		0–4	0–24	26–144	5

== Bolivia vs. Barbados ==
Bolivia
3
Carrasco Lawn Tennis Club, Montevideo, Uruguay
16 April 2007
Red clay (outdoors)

Barbados
0

			1	2	3
1	(Bolivia) (Barbados)	Daniela Trigo; Kristen Lopez	6; 0	6; 0
2	(Bolivia) (Barbados)	María Fernanda Álvarez Terán; Alyssa Fuentes	6; 0	6; 2
3	(Bolivia) (Barbados)	Daniela Álvarez / Daniela Trigo; Alyssa Fuentes / Kristen Lopez	6; 1	6; 0

== Paraguay vs. Guatemala ==
Paraguay
2
Carrasco Lawn Tennis Club, Montevideo, Uruguay
16 April 2007
Red clay (outdoors)

Guatemala
1

			1	2	3
1	(Paraguay) (Guatemala)	Verónica Cepede Royg; Ana Lilyan Guzmán	6; 0	6; 1
2	(Paraguay) (Guatemala)	Rossana de los Ríos; Jessica Lehnhoff	6; 2	6; 2
3	(Paraguay) (Guatemala)	Verónica Cepede Royg / Adriana Pereira; Ana Lilyan Guzmán / Jessica Lehnhoff	4; 6	6^{4} 7^{7}

== Bolivia vs. Paraguay ==
Bolivia
1
Carrasco Lawn Tennis Club, Montevideo, Uruguay
17 April 2007
Red clay (outdoors)

Paraguay
2

			1	2	3
1	(Bolivia) (Paraguay)	Daniela Trigo; Verónica Cepede Royg	6; 0	3; 6	1; 6
2	(Bolivia) (Paraguay)	María Fernanda Álvarez Terán; Rossana de los Ríos	0; 6	2; 6
3	(Bolivia) (Paraguay)	Daniela Álvarez / Daniela Trigo; Verónica Cepede Royg / Adriana Pereira	6^{4} 7^{7}	6; 4	8; 6

== Guatemala vs. Trinidad and Tobago ==
Guatemala
3
Carrasco Lawn Tennis Club, Montevideo, Uruguay
17 April 2007
Red clay (outdoors)

Trinidad and Tobago
0

			1	2	3
1	(Guatemala) (Trinidad and Tobago)	Ana Lilyan Guzmán; Shenelle Mohammed	2; 6	6; 4	6; 4
2	(Guatemala) (Trinidad and Tobago)	Jessica Lehnhoff; Olivia Bennett	6; 2	6; 4
3	(Guatemala) (Trinidad and Tobago)	Ana Lilyan Guzmán / Jessica Lehnhoff; Olivia Bennett / Carlista Mohammed	6; 3	6; 0

== Bolivia vs. Trinidad and Tobago ==
Bolivia
2
Carrasco Lawn Tennis Club, Montevideo, Uruguay
18 April 2007
Red clay (outdoors)

Trinidad and Tobago
1

			1	2	3
1	(Bolivia) (Trinidad and Tobago)	Daniela Trigo; Carlista Mohammed	6; 0	6; 0
2	(Bolivia) (Trinidad and Tobago)	María Fernanda Álvarez Terán; Olivia Bennett	6; 3	3; 6	5; 7
3	(Bolivia) (Trinidad and Tobago)	Daniela Álvarez / María Fernanda Álvarez Terán; Olivia Bennett / Shenelle Mohammed	6; 1	6; 2

== Paraguay vs. Barbados ==
Paraguay
3
Carrasco Lawn Tennis Club, Montevideo, Uruguay
18 April 2007
Red clay (outdoors)

Barbados
0

			1	2	3
1	(Paraguay) (Barbados)	Adriana Pereira; Kristen Lopez	6; 1	6; 1
2	(Paraguay) (Barbados)	Verónica Cepede Royg; Alyssa Fuentes	6; 1	6; 1
3	(Paraguay) (Barbados)	Verónica Cepede Royg / Adriana Pereira; Alyssa Fuentes / Kristen Lopez	6; 0	6; 0

== Paraguay vs. Trinidad and Tobago ==
Paraguay
3
Carrasco Lawn Tennis Club, Montevideo, Uruguay
19 April 2007
Red clay (outdoors)

Trinidad and Tobago
0

			1	2	3
1	(Paraguay) (Trinidad and Tobago)	Adriana Pereira; Raye-Ann Sandy	6; 2	7^{7} 6^{5}
2	(Paraguay) (Trinidad and Tobago)	Rossana de los Ríos; Olivia Bennett	6; 2	6; 3
3	(Paraguay) (Trinidad and Tobago)	Verónica Cepede Royg / Adriana Pereira; Carlista Mohammed / Shenelle Mohammed	6; 2	3; 6	6; 3

== Guatemala vs. Barbados ==
Guatemala
3
Carrasco Lawn Tennis Club, Montevideo, Uruguay
19 April 2007
Red clay (outdoors)

Barbados
0

			1	2	3
1	(Guatemala) (Barbados)	Paulina Schippers; Kristen Lopez	6; 3	6; 0
2	(Guatemala) (Barbados)	Jessica Lehnhoff; Alyssa Fuentes	6; 0	6; 0
3	(Guatemala) (Barbados)	Ana Lilyan Guzmán / Paulina Schippers; Alyssa Fuentes / Kristen Lopez	6; 2	6; 3

== Bolivia vs. Guatemala ==
Bolivia
2
Carrasco Lawn Tennis Club, Montevideo, Uruguay
20 April 2007
Red clay (outdoors)

Guatemala
1

			1	2	3
1	(Bolivia) (Guatemala)	Daniela Trigo; Ana Lilyan Guzmán	6; 1	6; 0
2	(Bolivia) (Guatemala)	María Fernanda Álvarez Terán; Jessica Lehnhoff	0; 6	3; 6
3	(Bolivia) (Guatemala)	Daniela Álvarez / María Fernanda Álvarez Terán; Ana Lilyan Guzmán / Jessica Lehnhoff	6; 3	6; 4

== Trinidad and Tobago vs. Barbados ==
Trinidad and Tobago
3
Carrasco Lawn Tennis Club, Montevideo, Uruguay
20 April 2007
Red clay (outdoors)

Barbados
0

			1	2	3
1	(Trinidad and Tobago) (Barbados)	Raye-Ann Sandy; Kristen Lopez	6; 3	6; 4
2	(Trinidad and Tobago) (Barbados)	Olivia Bennett; Alyssa Fuentes	6; 0	6; 0
3	(Trinidad and Tobago) (Barbados)	Carlista Mohammed / Shenelle Mohammed; Alyssa Fuentes / Kristen Lopez	6; 3	6; 1

== See also ==
- Fed Cup structure
