= Estefania Balda Álvarez =

Ecuadorian tennis player

- Country (sports): Ecuador
- Born: 30 June 1987 (age 38) Guayaquil, Ecuador
- Plays: Right (two-handed backhand)
- Prize money: $9,620

Singles
- Career record: 31–28
- Career titles: 1 ITF
- Highest ranking: No. 519 (12 September 2005)

Grand Slam singles results
- French Open Junior: 1R (2004)
- Wimbledon Junior: 1R (2004)

Doubles
- Career record: 22–17
- Career titles: 3 ITF
- Highest ranking: No. 459 (12 September 2005)

Grand Slam doubles results
- French Open Junior: 1R (2004)
- Wimbledon Junior: 1R (2004)

Estefania Balda Álvarez (born 25 June 1987) is an Ecuadorian former professional tennis player.

Balda Álvarez has career-high WTA rankings of 519 in singles, achieved on 12 September 2005, and 459 in doubles, set on 12 September 2005. In her career, she won one singles title and three doubles titles on the ITF Women's Circuit.

Playing for Ecuador Fed Cup team, Balda Álvarez has a win–loss record of 9–4.

== ITF finals ==
Legend
$25,000 tournaments
$10,000 tournaments

=== Singles: 2 (1 title, 1 runner–up) ===
Result	W–L	Date	Tournament	Tier	Surface	Opponent	Score
Win	1–0	Sep 2004	ITF Bogotá, Colombia	10,000	Clay	(Argentina) Maria-Belen Corbalan	6–1, 6–4
Loss	1–1	Oct 2004	ITF Goiânia, Brazil	10,000	Clay	(Argentina) María José Argeri	2–6, 4–6

=== Doubles: 3 (3 titles) ===
Result	W–L	Date	Tournament	Tier	Surface	Partner	Opponents	Score
Win	1–0	Sep 2004	ITF Bogotá, Colombia	10,000	Clay	(Ecuador) Karen Castiblanco	(Colombia) Mariana Duque Mariño (Colombia) Viky Núñez Fuentes	7–6^{(2)}, 7–5
Win	2–0	Oct 2004	ITF Campo Grande, Brazil	10,000	Clay	(Brazil) Roxane Vaisemberg	(Uruguay) Estefanía Craciún (Russia) Ekaterina Dranets	6–1, 6–4
Win	3–0	Aug 2005	ITF Bogotá, Colombia	10,000	Clay	(Venezuela) Mariana Muci	(Argentina) Luciana Sarmenti (Argentina) María Irigoyen	7–5, 6–3

== ITF Junior Circuit ==
Category G1
Category G2
Category G3
Category G4
Category G5

=== Singles (1–1) ===
Result	No.	Date	Location	Surface	Opponent	Score
Win	1.	Jan 2004	Barranquilla, Colombia	Clay	(United States) Julia Cohen	6–2, 6–3
Loss	2.	Jan 2005	Barranquilla, Colombia	Clay	(Italy) Giulia Gabba	6–4, 3–6, 1–6

=== Doubles (1–3) ===
Result	No.	Date	Location	Surface	Partner	Opponents	Score
Loss	1.	Feb 2004	Cuenca, Ecuador	Clay	(Bolivia) María Fernanda Álvarez Terán	(Chile) Liset Brito-Herrera (Argentina) Florencia Molinero	6–7^{(4)}, 6–7^{(5)}
Loss	2.	Mar 2004	Mar del Plata, Argentina	Clay	(Uruguay) Estefanía Craciún	(Argentina) Andrea Benítez (Argentina) Betina Jozami	2–6, 1–6
Loss	3.	Jan 2005	Barranquilla, Colombia	Clay	(Argentina) Florencia Molinero	(Netherlands) Bibiane Schoofs (Brazil) Roxane Vaisemberg	w/o
Win	4.	Jan 2005	Cuenca, Ecuador	Clay	(Brazil) Roxane Vaisemberg	(Austria) Anna Bartenstein (Argentina) Florencia Molinero	3–6, 6–3, 6–4
