= 2009 Fed Cup Americas Zone Group I – Pool B =

International tennis competition

Group B of the 2009 Fed Cup Americas Zone Group I was one of two pools in the Americas Zone Group I of the 2009 Fed Cup. Three teams competed in a round robin competition, with the top team and the bottom two teams proceeding to their respective sections of the play-offs: the top team played for advancement to the World Group II Play-offs, while the bottom teams faced potential relegation to Group II.

		(Colombia) COL	(Brazil) BRA	(Paraguay) PAR	RR; W–L	Set; W–L	Game; W–L	Standings
23	Colombia		2–1	0–3	1–1	5–9	58–75	2
24	Brazil	1–2		1–2	0–2	7–9	74–75	3
41	Paraguay	3–0	2–1		2–0	11–5	82–64	1

== Brazil vs. Paraguay ==
Brazil
1
Uniprix Stadium, Montreal, Canada
4 February 2009
Decoturf II (indoors)

Paraguay
2

			1	2	3
1	(Brazil) (Paraguay)	Roxane Vaisemberg; Verónica Cepede Royg	4; 4	6^{2} 7^{7}	3; 6
2	(Brazil) (Paraguay)	Vivian Segnini; Rossana de los Ríos	1; 6	6; 2	2; 6
3	(Brazil) (Paraguay)	Maria Fernanda Alves / Roxane Vaisemberg; Verónica Cepede Royg / Rossana de los Ríos	6; 2	3; 6	6; 3

== Colombia vs. Brazil ==
Colombia
2
Uniprix Stadium, Montreal, Canada
5 February 2009
Decoturf II (indoors)

Brazil
1

			1	2	3
1	(Colombia) (Brazil)	Catalina Castaño; Maria Fernanda Alves	6; 4	6; 3
2	(Colombia) (Brazil)	Mariana Duque Mariño; Vivian Segnini	2; 6	3; 6
3	(Colombia) (Brazil)	Catalina Castaño / Mariana Duque Mariño; Maria Fernanda Alves / Roxane Vaisemberg	7^{7} 6^{4}	3; 6	6; 4

== Colombia vs. Paraguay ==
Colombia
0
Uniprix Stadium, Montreal, Canada
6 February 2009
Decoturf II (indoors)

Paraguay
3

			1	2	3
1	(Colombia) (Paraguay)	Catalina Castaño; Verónica Cepede Royg	6; 2	2; 6	3; 6
2	(Colombia) (Paraguay)	Mariana Duque Mariño; Rossana de los Ríos	6^{4} 7^{7}	5; 7
3	(Colombia) (Paraguay)	Yuliana Lizarazo / Viky Núñez Fuentes; Verónica Cepede Royg / Isaura Enrique Aguilar	0; 6	3; 6

== See also ==
- Fed Cup structure
