= 2009 Fed Cup Americas Zone Group I – Pool A =

Group A of the 2009 Fed Cup Americas Zone Group I was one of two pools in the Americas Zone Group I of the 2009 Fed Cup. Three teams competed in a round robin competition, with the top team and the bottom two teams proceeding to their respective sections of the play-offs: the top team played for advancement to the World Group II Play-offs, while the bottom teams faced potential relegation to Group II.

| | | (Canada) CAN | (Puerto Rico) PUR | (The Bahamas) BAH | RR; W–L | Set; W–L | Game; W–L | Standings |
| 21 | Canada | | 3–0 | 3–0 | 2–0 | 12–0 | 72–9 | 1 |
| 27 | Puerto Rico | 0–3 | | 2–1 | 1–1 | 4–9 | 40–67 | 2 |
| 55 | Bahamas | 0–3 | 1–2 | | 0–2 | 3–10 | 33–69 | 3 |

== Puerto Rico vs. Bahamas ==
Puerto Rico
2
Uniprix Stadium, Montreal, Canada
4 February 2009
Decoturf II (indoors)

Bahamas
1

| | | | 1 | 2 | 3 |
|---|---|---|---|---|---|
| 1 | (Puerto Rico) (The Bahamas) | Monica Puig; Larikah Russell | 3; 6 | 6; 4 | 7; 5 |
| 2 | (Puerto Rico) (The Bahamas) | Jessica Roland-Rosario; Nikkita Fountain | 6; 2 | 6; 2 |
| 3 | (Puerto Rico) (The Bahamas) | Monica Puig / Jessica Roland-Rosario; Nikkita Fountain / Larikah Russell | 2; 6 | 3; 6 |

== Canada vs. Bahamas ==
Canada
3
Uniprix Stadium, Montreal, Canada
5 February 2009
Decoturf II (indoors)

Bahamas
0

| | | | 1 | 2 | 3 |
|---|---|---|---|---|---|
| 1 | (Canada) (The Bahamas) | Stéphanie Dubois; Kerrie Cartwright | 6; 0 | 6; 0 |
| 2 | (Canada) (The Bahamas) | Aleksandra Wozniak; Nikkita Fountain | 6; 0 | 6; 2 |
| 3 | (Canada) (The Bahamas) | Stéphanie Dubois / Sharon Fichman; Kerrie Cartwright / Nikkita Fountain | 6; 0 | 6; 0 |

== Canada vs. Puerto Rico ==
Canada
3
Uniprix Stadium, Montreal, Canada
6 February 2009
Decoturf II (indoors)

Puerto Rico
0

| | | | 1 | 2 | 3 |
|---|---|---|---|---|---|
| 1 | (Canada) (Puerto Rico) | Stéphanie Dubois; Monica Puig | 6; 2 | 6; 1 |
| 2 | (Canada) (Puerto Rico) | Aleksandra Wozniak; Jessica Roland-Rosario | 6; 3 | 6; 1 |
| 3 | (Canada) (Puerto Rico) | Stéphanie Dubois / Sharon Fichman; Rocío Portela / Gabriela Vásquez | 6; 0 | 6; 0 |

== See also ==
- Fed Cup structure
