= 2008 Fed Cup Americas Zone =

Subsection of tennis competition

The Americas Zone was one of three zones of regional competition in the 2008 Fed Cup.

== Group I ==
- Venue: Club Deportivo El Rodeo, Medellín, Colombia (outdoor clay)
- Date: 30 January – 2 February

The seven teams were divided into two pools, one pool of four teams and one of three. The top team of each pool played against one other to decide which nation progresses to the World Group II Play-offs. The four nations coming third in each pool then played-off to determine which team would join the fourth-placed team from the four-team pool in being relegated down to Group II for 2009.

=== Pools ===
	Pool A	BRA	PUR	PAR	URU
1	Brazil (3–0)		2–1	3–0	2–1
2	Puerto Rico (2–1)	1–2		3–0	3–0
3	Paraguay (1–2)	0–3	0–3		3–0
4	Uruguay (0–3)	1–2	0–3	0–3	

	Pool B	COL	CAN	MEX
1	Colombia (2–0)		2–1	3–0
2	Canada (1–1)	1–2		3–0
3	Mexico (0–2)	0–3	0–3	

=== Play-offs ===
Placing	A Team	Score	B Team
Promotion	Brazil	0–3	Colombia
3rd–4th	Puerto Rico	0–3	Canada
Relegation	Paraguay	3–0	Mexico
Relegation	Uruguay	N/A	

- Colombia advanced to 2008 World Group II Play-offs.
- Mexico and Uruguay was relegated to Group II for 2009.

== Group II ==
- Venue: Country Club Cochabamba, Cochabamba, Bolivia (outdoor clay)
- Date: 23–26 April

The thirteen teams were divided into three pools of three teams and one pool of four. The top teams of each pool played-off against one other to decide which two nations progress to the Group I.

=== Pools ===
	Pool A	CHI	CUB	PAN
1	Chile (2–0)		2–1	3–0
2	Cuba (1–1)	1–2		3–0
3	Panama (0–2)	0–3	0–3	

	Pool B	BOL	ECU	HON
1	Bolivia (2–0)		3–0	3–0
2	Ecuador (1–1)	0–3		3–0
3	Honduras (0–2)	0–3	0–3	

	Pool C	VEN	GUA	BAR
1	Venezuela (2–0)		2–1	3–0
2	Guatemala (1–1)	1–2		3–0
3	Barbados (0–2)	0–3	0–3	

	Pool D	BAH	DOM	TRI	BER
1	Bahamas (3–0)		3–0	2–1	3–0
2	Dominican Republic (2–1)	0–3		3–0	3–0
3	Trinidad and Tobago (1–2)	1–2	0–3		3–0
4	Bermuda (0–3)	0–3	0–3	0–3	

=== Play-offs ===
Placing	A Team	Score	C Team
Promotion	Chile	1–2	Venezuela
5th–8th	Cuba	2–1	Guatemala
9th–12th	Panama	2–1	Barbados

Placing	B Team	Score	D Team
Promotion	Bolivia	1–2	Bahamas
5th–8th	Ecuador	3–0	Dominican Republic
9th–12th	Honduras	2–1	Trinidad and Tobago
13th		N/A	Bermuda

- Venezuela and Bahamas advanced to Group I for 2009.

== See also ==
- Fed Cup structure
