= Mariana Muci =

Venezuelan tennis player (born 1988)

- Full name: Mariana Muci Torres
- Country (sports): Venezuela
- Born: 15 February 1988 (age 38) Lebanon
- Plays: Right-handed
- Prize money: $25,411

Singles
- Highest ranking: No. 513 (26 November 2007)

Doubles
- Career titles: 8 ITF
- Highest ranking: No. 360 (10 December 2007)

Mariana Muci Torres (born 15 February 1988) is a Venezuelan former professional tennis player.

== Career ==
Muci grew up in the Venezuelan city of Valencia, but was born in Lebanon.

A right-handed player, she featured in a total of 12 ties for the Venezuela Fed Cup team, the first in 2004. She also represented Venezuela in Central American and Caribbean Games and Pan American Games competition. At the 2006 Central American and Caribbean Games, she won a gold medal in the women's doubles.

In 2008, she left the professional tour to attend Florida International University, and now she works as an attorney in Miami.

== ITF finals ==
=== Doubles: 15 (8–7) ===
Outcome	No.	Date	Tournament	Surface	Partner	Opponents	Score
Winner	1.	22 August 2005	Bogotá, Colombia	Clay	(Ecuador) Estefania Balda Álvarez	(Argentina) Luciana Sarmenti (Argentina) María Irigoyen	7–5, 6–3
Runner-up	1.	3 July 2006	Valencia, Venezuela	Hard	(Uruguay) Estefanía Craciún	(Cuba) Yamile Fors Guerra (Cuba) Yanet Núñez Mojarena	4–6, 4–6
Winner	2.	14 August 2006	Guayaquil, Ecuador	Hard	(Uruguay) Estefanía Craciún	(Chile) Andrea Koch Benvenuto (Argentina) Jesica Orselli	3–6, 7–6^{(5)}, 6–3
Runner-up	2.	4 September 2006	Caracas, Venezuela	Hard	(Colombia) Karen Castiblanco	(United States) Story Tweedie-Yates (United States) Jodi Kenoyer	1–6, 1–6
Winner	3.	2 October 2006	Tucumán, Argentina	Clay	(Argentina) Agustina Lepore	(Argentina) Luciana Sarmenti (Argentina) Flavia Mignola	6–4, 6–3
Runner-up	3.	23 October 2006	Luque, Paraguay	Clay	(Chile) Melisa Miranda	(Colombia) Karen Castiblanco (Argentina) Flavia Mignola	3–6, 3–6
Winner	4.	11 November 2006	Caracas, Venezuela	Clay	(Venezuela) Marina Giral Lores	(Brazil) Fabiana Mak (Brazil) Joana Cortez	4–6, 7–5, 7–5
Runner-up	4.	23 February 2007	Melilla, Spain	Hard	(Greece) Anna Gerasimou	(Spain) Melissa Cabrera-Handt (Spain) Carolina Gago-Fuentes	3–6, 4–6
Winner	5.	3 March 2007	Benin City, Nigeria	Hard	(Brazil) Ana Clara Duarte	(Belgium) Debbrich Feys (Ukraine) Kateryna Polunina	3–6, 6–3, 7–5
Runner-up	5.	9 March 2007	Benin City, Nigeria	Hard	(Brazil) Ana Clara Duarte	(Belgium) Debbrich Feys (Ukraine) Kateryna Polunina	3–6, 4–6
Winner	6.	6 August 2007	Caracas, Venezuela	Hard	(Russia) Angelina Gabueva	(South Africa) Tegan Edwards (United States) Lena Litvak	6–2, 6–2
Winner	7.	20 October 2007	Valencia, Venezuela	Clay	(Bolivia) María Fernanda Álvarez Terán	(United States) Kit Carson (United States) Katie Ruckert	6–1, 6–4
Winner	8.	27 October 2007	Valencia, Venezuela	Hard	(Bolivia) María Fernanda Álvarez Terán	(Colombia) Karen Castiblanco (Ecuador) Hilda Zuleta Cabrera	4–6, 6–1, [10–7]
Runner-up	6.	10 November 2007	Lima, Peru	Clay	(Brazil) Ana Clara Duarte	(Bolivia) María Fernanda Álvarez Terán (Peru) Claudia Razzeto	6–3, 6–7^{(4)}, [5–10]
Runner-up	7.	1 December 2007	Mexico City	Hard	(Bolivia) María Fernanda Álvarez Terán	(Mexico) Lorena Arias (Mexico) Erika Clarke	4–6, 4–6
