= Porto Seguro =

Municipality of Bahia, Brazil

Porto Seguro Safe Harbor
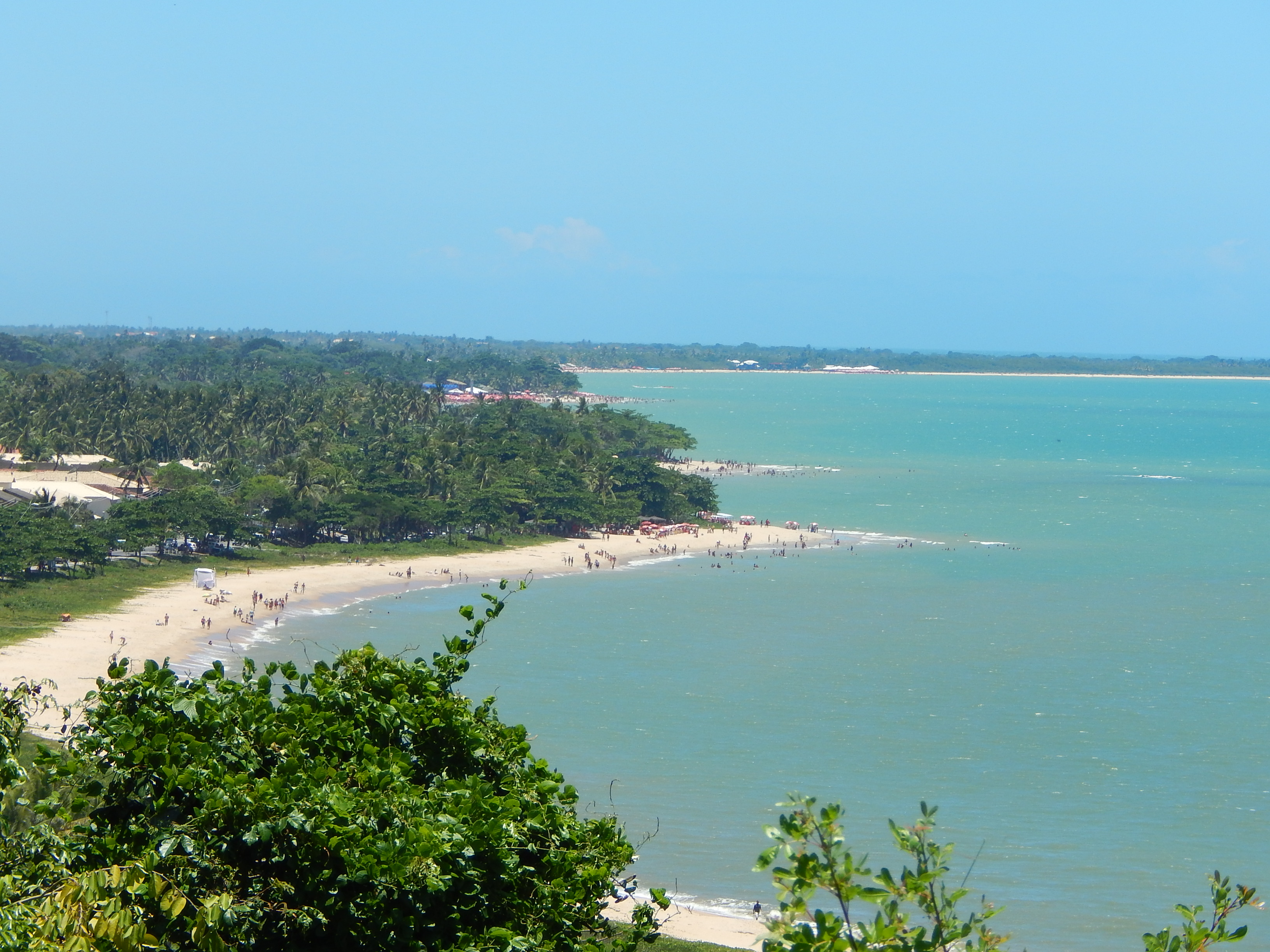

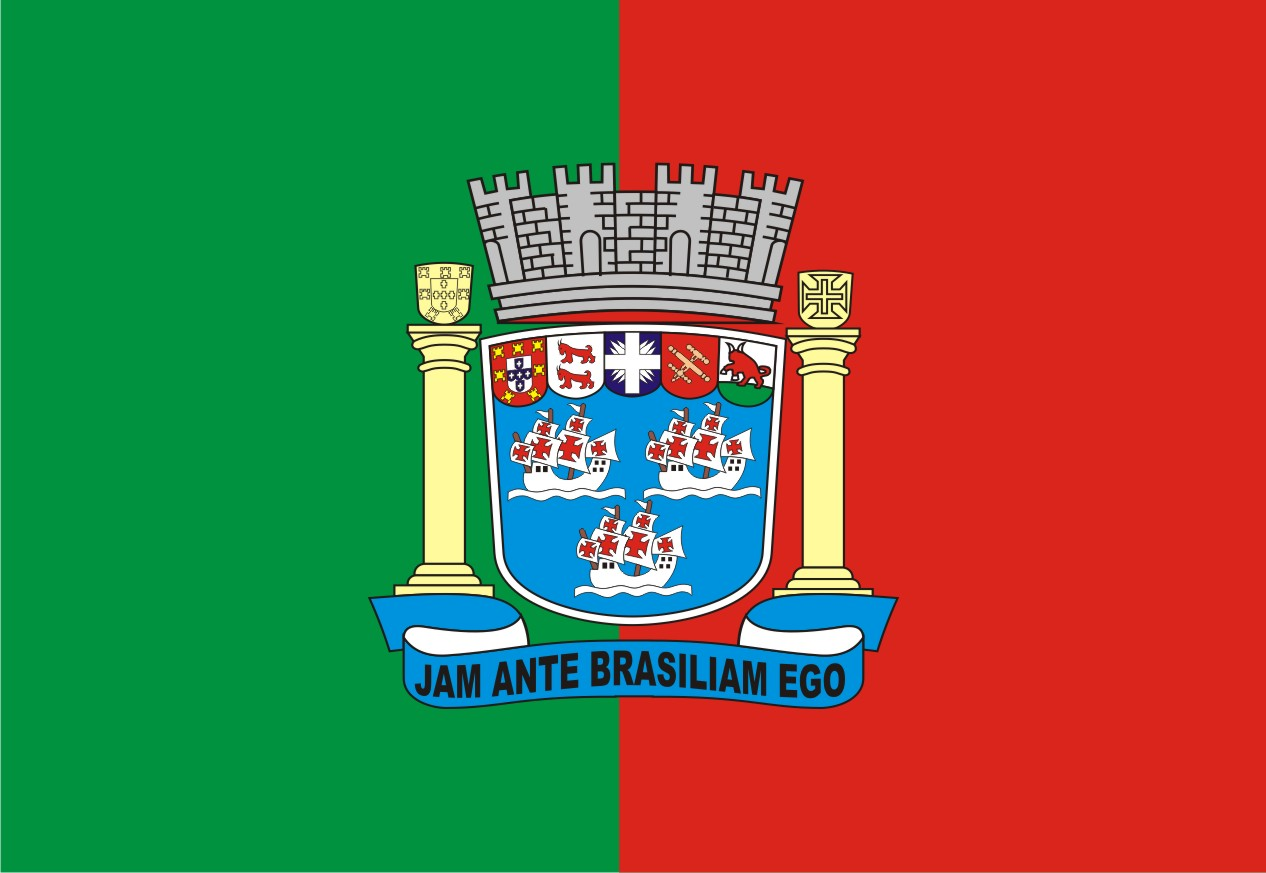
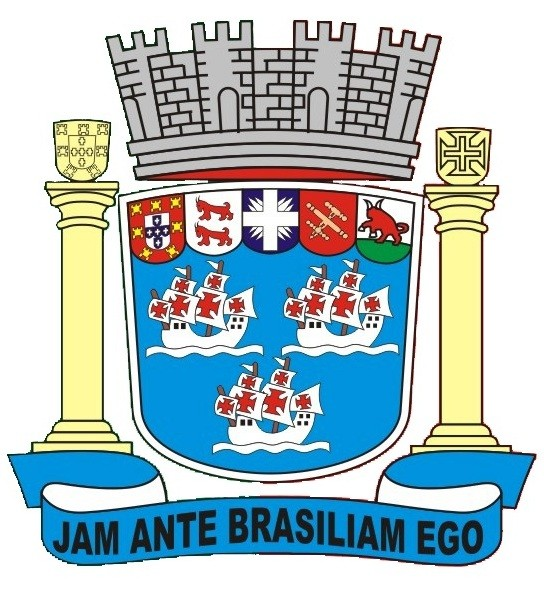
- Flag Coat of arms
- Motto: Jam ante brasiliam ego (Latin); Before Brazil, I
- Location of Porto Seguro
- Coordinates: 16°26′S 39°05′W
- Country: Brazil
- Region: Nordeste
- State: Bahia
- Founded: 30 June 1534

Government
  - Mayor: Jânio Natal Andrade Borges PL

Area
  - Total: 2,287 km^{2} (883 sq mi)
- Elevation: 4 m (13 ft)

Population (2022 Brazilian Census)
  - Total: 168,326
  - Estimate (2025): 182.630
  - Density: 73.60/km^{2} (190.6/sq mi)
- Time zone: UTC−3 (BRT)
- Postal code: 45810-000
- Website: portosegurotur.com

National Historic Heritage of Brazil
- Designated: 1968
- Reference no.: 800

Porto Seguro (Portuguese pronunciation: [ˈpoʁtu siˈɡuɾu], Safe Harbor in English), is a city located in the far south of Bahia, Brazil. The city has an estimated population of 168,326 (2022 Census), covers 2,287 square kilometres (883 mi^{2}), and has a population density of 52.7 residents per square kilometer. The area that includes Porto Seguro and neighbouring Santa Cruz Cabrália and Eunápolis holds a distinctive place in Brazilian history: in 1500 it was the first landing point of Portuguese navigators, principally Pedro Álvares Cabral.

== Geography ==
Porto Seguro

Climate chart (precipitation, max. and min. temperature)
J	F	M	A	M	J	J	A	S	O	N	D
88 30 22	96 30 22	118 29 22	169 28 21	159 27 20	151 26 19	176 26 18	101 27 19	131 28 20	148 28 21	143 29 22	130 29 21
- █ Average max. and min. temperatures in °C
- █ Precipitation totals in mm
- Source: Weather to Travel
Imperial conversion
J	F	M	A	M	J	J	A	S	O	N	D
3.5 86 72	3.8 86 72	4.6 84 72	6.7 82 70	6.3 81 68	5.9 79 66	6.9 79 64	4 81 66	5.2 82 68	5.8 82 70	5.6 84 72	5.1 84 70
- █ Average max. and min. temperatures in °F
- █ Precipitation totals in inches

=== Climate ===
The climate in Porto Seguro is warm, pleasant, and partly cloudy. Over the course of the year, the temperature typically varies from 19 °C lows (67 °F) to 29C highs (84 °F) and is rarely below 18 °C (65 °F) or above 31 °C (88 °F). The temperature in Porto Seguro varies so little throughout the year that it is not entirely meaningful to discuss hot and cold seasons.

=== Subdivisions ===
Porto Seguro is divided into five districts

- Porto Seguro (city seat);
- Arraial d'Ajuda;
- Caraíva
- Trancoso
- Vale Verde

=== Conservation ===
The municipality contains the 1,151-hectare (2,840-acre) Pau-Brasil Ecological Station, a fully protected conservation unit created in 1997 to protect a fragment of Atlantic Forest, and specifically to protect Brazil wood (Pau Brasil, Caesalpinia echinata). It contains the 894-hectare (2,210-acre) Rio dos Frades Wildlife Refuge, created in 2007 to protect the mouth of the Frades River. The municipality also contains part of the Corumbau Marine Extractive Reserve, a protected offshore fishing area of 89,597 hectares (221,400 acres).

== Economy ==
The city is now considered one of the most important destinations of Brazil, receiving tourists from Brazil, Argentina, Uruguay, and Chile. The city and surrounding area have some luxury hotels and hundreds of smaller hotels, as well as an airport well connected with the major Brazilian cities. Apart from tourism, other important activities are agriculture (especially cashew and coconut), reforestation with eucalyptus trees, cattle, and trade and services.

The city offers one of the most famous Carnival parties in Bahia. “Electric Trios” (trucks carrying sound systems and live bands), dancing “blocos” and “cordões” (street dancing groups) drag thousands of tourists along the "Passarela do Álcool" Passageway (the traditional local avenue) and to beach bars.

== Notable places ==
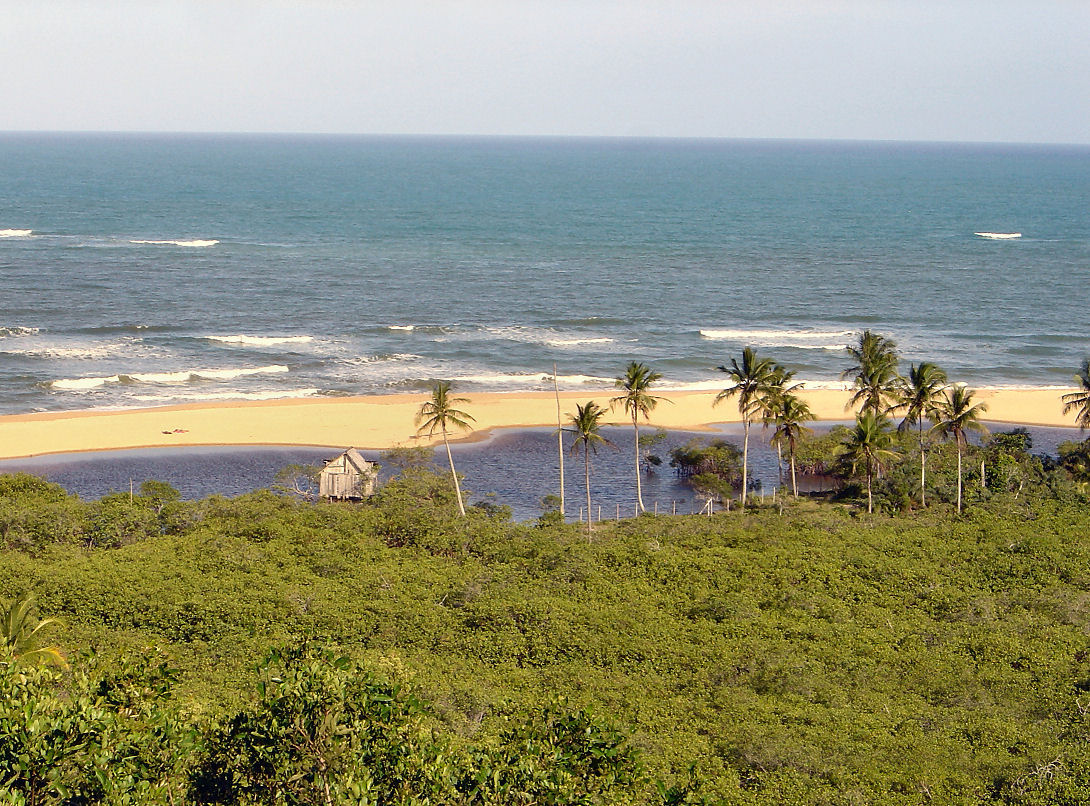
Beach in Porto Seguro

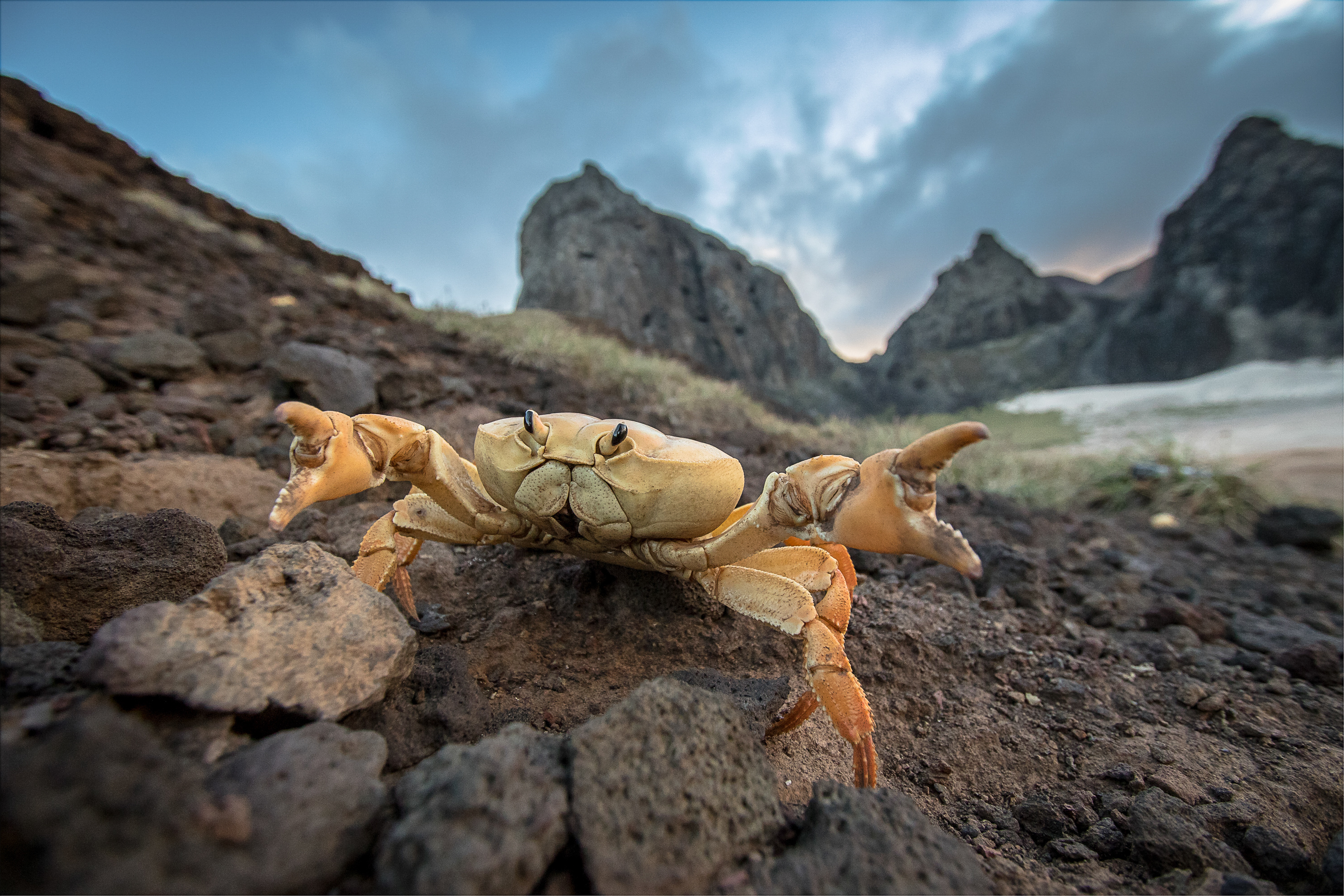
Johngarthia lagostoma

Historical Downtown Area The historical site in the Cidade Alta area is a National Heritage Monument put under government trust by federal decree since 1973. It was one of the first towns in Brazil and played an important role during the first years of European colonization. It includes three churches and around 40 buildings (among private residential houses and public institutions), restored by the state government for the 500th anniversary celebration of Brazilian discovery.

Monte Pascoal National Park Created in 1961 to preserve the place where Brazil was discovered by Portuguese warriors. It includes swamp areas, salt marshes, river marshes, and a coastline around the rocky, high, round hill, considered the first point of land to be seen by the Portuguese traveler Pedro Álvares Cabral’s crew. It extends over an area of 144.8 square kilometres (55.9 mi^{2}), including the Pataxó tribe’s indigenous protection land. Besides its historical importance, it also offers protection to one of the last stretches of Atlantic forest in the Northeastern area of Brazil. The area is aimed at preserving valuable woods such as Brazil wood, and still hosts many species of animals threatened by extinction, including the collared sloth and black bear.

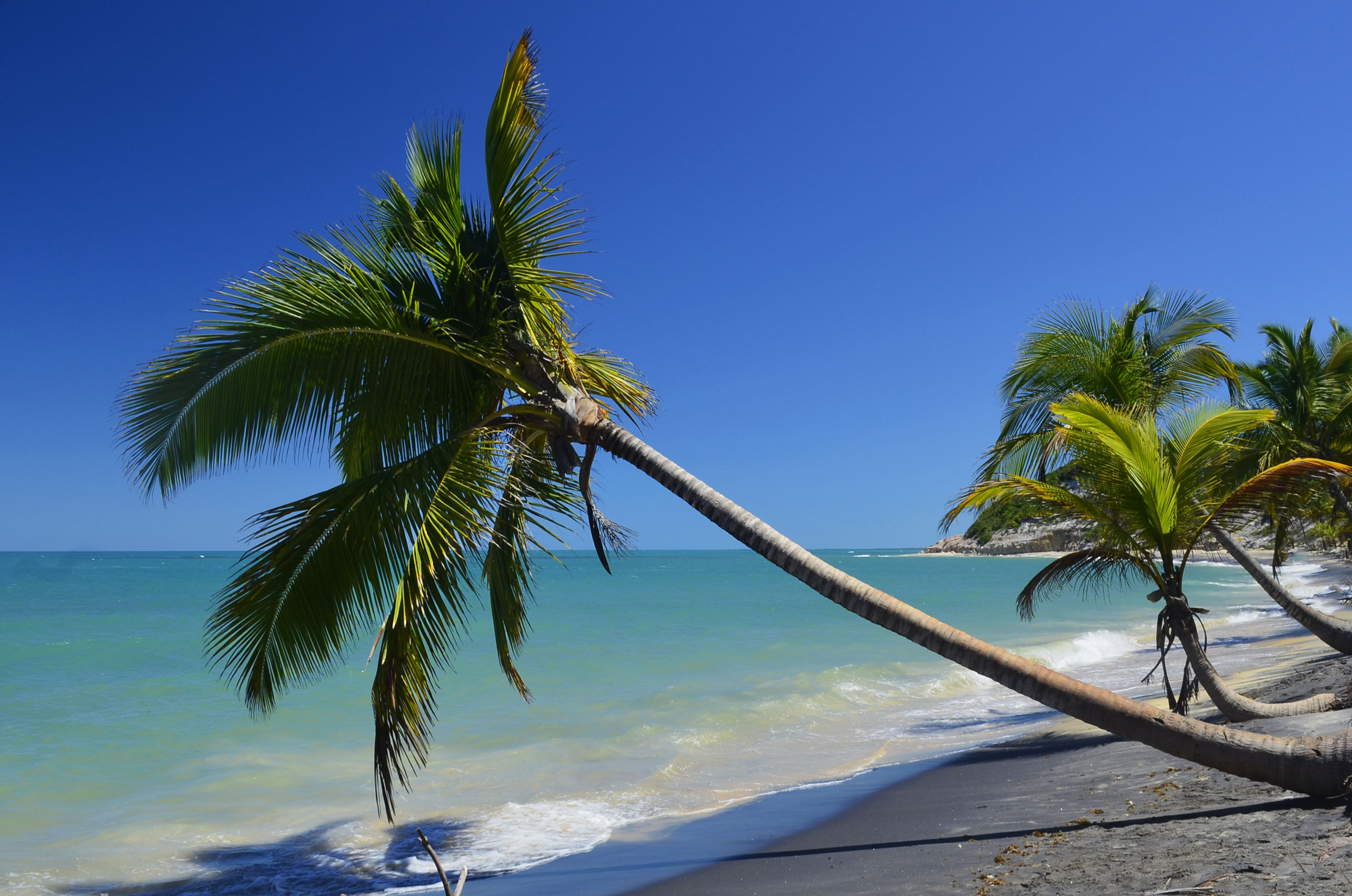
Espelho beach

Recife de Fora Sea Park It was the first city-owned park in Brazil. During low tide, visitors can view a wide range of coral reefs, fish, and many sea species.

Glória Hillock These are ruins of what many consider to be the São Francisco Church, where Ynaiá, an Indian woman who died for the love of a crewmember of Portuguese navigator Gonçalo Coelho's fleet, was buried. The São Francisco Church is said to be the first one built in Brazil in baroque style, probably in 1504, whose ruins date to 1730.

The Nossa Senhora da Penha Matrix Church Located on Pero de Campos Tourinho Square, in Cidade Alta, it was built at the end of the 18th century. It comprises a nave, a main chapel, a sacristy, and a bell tower.

Jaqueira Indigenous Protection Reservation A huge jackfruit tree trunk, tumbled down by nature itself, represents the return to one’s origins and acts as a historical and cultural reference to honor the ancestral fathers and mothers of Pataxó families who recently moved into this 8.27 square kilometres (3.19 mi^{2}) Indian protection area. Their huts, spread around original Atlantic Forest woods, retain the original formats, giving visitors the impression of being back 500 years in time to pre-Columbian Brazil.

The Discovery Outdoors Museum An outdoors, natural museum, whose “art galleries” are its beaches, valleys and natural trails and whose “collection” is a set of geographical formations and traditional villages, disposed as art works in permanent exhibition, engraved in ancient media, which are spread along the 130 square kilometres (50 mi^{2}) length of Bahia’s historical southern coastline.

== Transport ==
=== Airway ===
Porto Seguro Airport was opened in 1982. Its passenger terminal was very simple and small; this building is now occupied by the Fire Department of the city. In 1997, the airport was reopened, having received a new passenger terminal, new aircraft parking lot, and extension of runway to operate large aircraft. In 2010 the airport had some major renovations preparing the city to host several of the International football teams who had a training camp in Porto Seguro for the 2014 FIFA World Cup.

== See also ==
- List of municipalities in Bahia
