= Melisa Miranda =

Chilean tennis player (born 1988)

- Full name: Melisa Miranda-Otarola
- Country (sports): Chile
- Born: 28 April 1988 (age 38) Santiago, Chile
- Plays: Right-handed
- Prize money: $25,399

Singles
- Career record: 89–84
- Career titles: 2 ITF
- Highest ranking: No. 447 (22 December 2008)

Doubles
- Career record: 45–63
- Career titles: 0
- Highest ranking: No. 436 (15 October 2007)

Team competitions
- Fed Cup: 12–5

Melisa Miranda-Otarola (born 28 April 1988) is a Chilean former professional tennis player.

Born in Santiago, Miranda played in the Fed Cup for Chile from 2005 to 2009. She featured in a total of eleven ties for her country and won eight of her nine singles rubbers. In addition to the Fed Cup, she also represented Chile at the 2007 Pan American Games.

Miranda, a right-handed player, reached a best singles ranking of 447 on the professional tour. She made her only WTA Tour main-draw appearance at the 2008 Cachantún Cup in Viña del Mar, as a local wildcard in the women's singles. Both of her two ITF title wins also came in 2008.

== ITF finals ==
=== Singles (2–1) ===
Result	Date	Tournament	Surface	Opponent	Score
Loss	28 October 2006	Luque, Paraguay	Clay	(Brazil) Roxane Vaisemberg	3–6, 3–6
Win	14 July 2008	Badajoz, Spain	Hard	(France) Adeline Goncalves	6–4, 6–3
Win	14 December 2008	Havana, Cuba	Hard	(Brazil) Ana Clara Duarte	6–0, 6–4

=== Doubles (0–4) ===
Result	No.	Date	Tournament	Surface	Partner	Opponents	Score
Loss	1.	26 June 2006	Córdoba, Argentina	Clay	(Argentina) Luciana Sarmenti	(Argentina) Flavia Mignola (Argentina) María Irigoyen	3–6, 4–6
Loss	2.	23 October 2006	Luque, Paraguay	Clay	(Venezuela) Mariana Muci	(Colombia) Karen Castiblanco (Argentina) Flavia Mignola	3–6, 3–6
Loss	3.	14 May 2007	Córdoba, Argentina	Clay	(Colombia) Karen Castiblanco	(Argentina) Andrea Benítez (Argentina) María Irigoyen	2–6, 4–6
Loss	4.	17 September 2007	Chihuahua, Mexico	Clay	(Ecuador) Hilda Zuleta Cabrera	(Mexico) Daniela Múñoz Gallegos (Mexico) Valeria Pulido	6–7^{(1)}, 5–7
