= 2009 Fed Cup Americas Zone =

Subsection of tennis competition

The Americas Zone was one of three zones of regional competition in the 2009 Fed Cup.

== Group I ==
- Venue: Uniprix Stadium, Montreal, Canada (indoor hard)
- Date: 4–7 February

The six teams were divided into two pools of three teams. The top team of each pool played against one other to decide which nation progresses to the World Group II Play-offs. The four nations that came either second or third in each pool then played-off to determine which two teams would be relegated down to Group II for 2010.

=== Pools ===
	Pool A	CAN	PUR	BAH
1	Canada (2–0)		3–0	3–0
2	Puerto Rico (1–1)	0–3		2–1
3	Bahamas (0–2)	0–3	1–2	

	Pool B	PAR	COL	BRA
1	Paraguay (2–0)		3–0	2–1
2	Colombia (1–1)	0–3		2–1
3	Brazil (0–2)	1–2	1–2	

=== Play-offs ===
Placing	A Team	Score	B Team
Promotion	Canada	3–0	Paraguay
Relegation	Puerto Rico	0–3	Brazil
Relegation	Bahamas	0–3	Colombia

- Canada advanced to 2009 World Group II Play-offs.
- Puerto Rico and Bahamas was relegated to Group II for 2010.

== Group II ==
- Venue: Parque del Este, Santo Domingo, Dominican Republic (outdoor hard)
- Date: 21–25 April

The nine teams were divided into one pool of four teams and one pool of five. The top two teams of each pool played-off against each other to decide which two nations progress to the Group I.

=== Pools ===
	Pool A	CHI	MEX	PER	PAN
1	Chile (2–1)		2–1	1–2	3–0
2	Mexico (2–1)	1–2		2–1	3–0
3	Peru (2–1)	2–1	1–2		3–0
4	Panama (0–3)	0–3	0–3	0–3	

	Pool B	CUB	BOL	GUA	DOM	TRI
1	Cuba (4–0)		3–0	3–0	3–0	3–0
2	Bolivia (2–2)	0–3		1–2	2–1	3–0
3	Guatemala (2–2)	0–3	2–1		1–2	3–0
4	Dominican Republic (1–3)	0–3	1–2	2–1		1–2
5	Trinidad and Tobago (1–3)	0–3	0–3	0–3	2–1	

- Chile and Cuba advanced to Group I for 2010.

== See also ==
- Fed Cup structure
