= 2006 Fed Cup Europe/Africa Zone =

Subsection of tennis competition

The Europe/Africa Zone was one of three zones of regional competition in the 2006 Fed Cup.

== Group I ==
- Venue: TC Lokomotiv, Plovdiv, Bulgaria (outdoor clay)
- Dates: 17–22 April

The seventeen teams were divided into three pools of four teams and one pool of five. The top teams of each pool played-off against each other to decide which two nations progress to World Group II Play-offs. The four nations coming last played-off against each other to decide which teams are relegated to Group II for 2006.

=== Pools ===
	Pool A	SVK	NED	LUX	FIN
1	Slovakia (3–0)		2–1	3–0	3–0
2	Netherlands (2–1)	1–2		3–0	3–0
3	Luxembourg (1–2)	0–3	0–3		3–0
4	Finland (0–3)	0–3	0–3	0–3	

	Pool B	SCG	DEN	SLO	RSA
1	Serbia and Montenegro (3–0)		3–0	2–1	3–0
2	Denmark (2–1)	0–3		2–0	3–0
3	Slovenia (1–2)	1–2	0–2		3–0
4	South Africa (0–3)	0–3	0–3	0–3	

	Pool C	GBR	BUL	HUN	UKR
1	Great Britain (3–0)		2–1	2–1	3–0
2	Bulgaria (1–2)	1–2		1–2	2–1
3	Hungary (1–2)	1–2	2–1		1–2
4	Ukraine (1–2)	0–3	1–2	2–1	

	Pool D	ISR	ROU	BLR	EST	SWE
1	Israel (4–0)		2–1	2–0	2–1	3–0
2	Romania (2–2)	1–2		2–1	2–1	1–2
3	Belarus (2–2)	0–2	1–2		2–1	2–1
4	Estonia (1–3)	1–2	1–2	1–2		3–0
5	Sweden (1–3)	0–3	2–1	1–2	0–3	

=== Play-offs ===
Winning Team	Score	Losing team
Slovakia	2–1	Great Britain
Israel	2–1	Serbia and Montenegro

Winning Team	Score	Losing Team
Ukraine	2–0	Finland
Sweden	3–0	South Africa

- Slovakia and Israel advanced to the 2006 World Group II Play-offs.
- Finland and South Africa were relegated to Group II for 2007.

== Group II ==
- Venue: Club Ali Bey, Manavgat, Antalya, Turkey (outdoor clay)
- Dates: 26–29 April

The seven teams were divided into one pool of three teams and one pool of four. The top two teams of each pool played-off against each other to decide which two nations progress to Group I for 2007. The four nations coming third in each pool then played-off to determine which team would join the fourth-placed team from the four-team pool in being relegated down to Group III for 2007.

=== Pools ===
	Pool A	LTU	GEO	IRL
1	Lithuania (2–0)		2–1	2–1
2	Georgia (1–1)	1–2		2–1
3	Ireland (0–2)	1–2	1–2	

	Pool B	POL	POR	GRE	LAT
1	Poland (3–0)		3–0	3–0	3–0
2	Portugal (2–1)	0–3		2–1	2–1
3	Greece (1–2)	0–3	1–2		2–1
4	Latvia (0–3)	0–3	1–2	1–2	

=== Play-offs ===
Placing	A Team	Score	B Team
Promotion	Lithuania	2–0	Portugal
Promotion	Georgia	0–3	Poland
Relegation	Ireland	1–2	Greece
Relegation		N/A	Latvia

- Lithuania and Poland advanced to Group I for 2007.
- Ireland and Latvia was relegated to Group III for 2007.

== Group III ==
- Venue: Club Ali Bey, Manavgat, Antalya, Turkey (outdoor clay)
- Dates: 26–29 April

The eleven teams were divided into one pool of five teams and one pool of six. The top two teams of each pool played-off against each other to decide which two nations progress to Group II for 2007.

=== Pools ===
	Pool A	NOR	TUR	TUN	MDA	ISL
1	Norway (4–0)		2–0	2–1	2–0	2–0
2	Turkey (3–1)	0–2		2–1	2–0	3–0
3	Tunisia (2–2)	1–2	1–2		2–0	2–1
4	Moldova (1–3)	0–2	0–2	0–2		2–0
5	Iceland (0–4)	0–2	0–3	1–2	0–2	

	Pool B	BIH	EGY	LIE	NAM	AZE	BOT
1	Bosnia and Herzegovina (5–0)		2–0	2–0	3–0	2–0	3–0
2	Egypt (4–1)	0–2		2–1	2–0	2–0	3–0
3	Liechtenstein (3–2)	0–2	1–2		2–0	2–0	2–0
4	Namibia (2–3)	0–3	0–2	0–2		2–1	2–0
5	Azerbaijan (1–4)	0–2	0–2	0–2	1–2		2–0
6	Botswana (0–5)	0–3	0–3	0–2	0–2	0–2	

- Norway and Bosnia and Herzegovina advanced to Group II for 2007.

== See also ==
- Fed Cup structure
