= 2005 Fed Cup Americas Zone Group I – play-offs =

Tennis competition play-offs

The play-offs of the 2005 Fed Cup Americas Zone Group I were the final stages of the Group I Zonal Competition involving teams from the Americas. Using the positions determined in their pools, the nine teams faced off to determine their placing in the 2005 Fed Cup Americas Zone Group I, the top countries of each pool played for first to second, while the bottom two of each pool competed for fifth to eighth. The teams that ended up placing first overall advanced to World Group II play-offs, whilst those coming in seventh were relegated down to Group II for the next year.

Placing	Pool A	Pool B
1	Puerto Rico	Canada
2	Uruguay	Brazil
3	Mexico	Cuba
4	Bolivia	Paraguay

== Promotion play-offs ==
The first placed teams of each pool were placed against each other in a head-to-head round. The winner of the rounds advanced to the World Group II play-offs, where they would get a chance to advance to the World Group II for next year.

=== Puerto Rico vs. Canada ===
Puerto Rico
2
Carrasco Lawn Tennis Club, Montevideo, Uruguay
23 April 2005
Red clay (outdoors)

Canada
0

			1	2	3
1	(Puerto Rico) (Canada)	Vilmarie Castellvi; Aleksandra Wozniak	7; 5	4; 6	11; 9
2	(Puerto Rico) (Canada)	Kristina Brandi; Marie-Ève Pelletier	6; 4	3; 6	8; 6
3	(Puerto Rico) (Canada)	Kristina Brandi / Vilmarie Castellvi; Stéphanie Dubois / Marie-Ève Pelletier				not played

== Third to Fourth play-off ==
The second placed teams of each pool were placed against each other in a tie. The winner of the tie was allocated third place in the Group while the loser was allocated fourth.

=== Uruguay vs. Brazil ===
Uruguay
0
Carrasco Lawn Tennis Club, Montevideo, Uruguay
23 April 2005
Red clay (outdoors)

Brazil
3

			1	2	3
1	(Uruguay) (Brazil)	Estefanía Craciun; Larissa Carvalho	0; 6	1; 6
2	(Uruguay) (Brazil)	Ana Lucía Migliarini de León; Jenifer Widjaja	7; 5	2; 6	0; 6
3	(Uruguay) (Brazil)	Camila Belassi / María Eugenia Roca Recarey; Maria Fernanda Alves / Joana Cortez	3; 6	1; 6

== Relegation play-offs ==
The last and second-to-last placed teams of each pool were placed against each other in two head-to-head rounds. The losing team of the rounds were relegated to Group II for next year.

=== Bolivia vs. Cuba ===
Bolivia
1
Carrasco Lawn Tennis Club, Montevideo, Uruguay
23 April 2005
Red clay (outdoors)

Cuba
2

			1	2	3
1	(Bolivia) (Cuba)	María Irene Squillaci Sandoval; Yanet Núñez Mojarena	0; 5	2; 5
2	(Bolivia) (Cuba)	María Fernanda Álvarez Terán; Yamile Fors Guerra	2; 6	6; 4	6; 4
3	(Bolivia) (Cuba)	María Fernanda Álvarez Terán / María Irene Squillaci Sandoval; Yamile Fors Guerra / Yanet Núñez Mojarena	4; 6	4; 6

=== Mexico vs. Paraguay ===
Mexico
3
Carrasco Lawn Tennis Club, Montevideo, Uruguay
23 April 2005
Red clay (outdoors)

Paraguay
0

			1	2	3
1	(Mexico) (Paraguay)	Daniela Múñoz Gallegos; Madeleine Madelaire	2; 6	6; 1	6; 0
2	(Mexico) (Paraguay)	Melissa Torres Sandoval; Sarah Tami Masi	3; 6	6; 2	6; 3
3	(Mexico) (Paraguay)	Marcela Arroyo / Erika Clarke; Amanda Melgarejo / Sarah Tami Masi	0; 6	6; 1	6; 0

== Final Placements ==
Placing	Teams
Promoted	Puerto Rico
Second	Canada
Third	Brazil
Fourth	Uruguay
Fifth	Cuba
Fifth	Mexico
Relegated	Bolivia
Relegated	Paraguay

- Puerto Rico advanced to the World Group II play-offs, and were drawn against Indonesia, where they lost 1–4. The team thus was relegated back to Group I for the next year.
- Bolivia and Paraguay were relegated down to Americas Zone Group II for the next year, where they both placed equal third.

== See also ==
- Fed Cup structure
