= 2005 Fed Cup Americas Zone =

Subsection of tennis competition

The Americas Zone was one of three zones of regional competition in the 2005 Fed Cup.

== Group I ==
- Venue: Carrasco Lawn Tennis Club, Montevideo, Uruguay (outdoor clay)
- Date: 20–23 April

The eight teams were divided into two pools of four teams. The teams that finished first in the pools played-off to determine which team would partake in the World Group II Play-offs. The four nations coming last or second-to-last in the pools also played-off to determine which would be relegated to Group II for 2006.

=== Pools ===
	Pool A	PUR	URU	MEX	BOL
1	Puerto Rico (3–0)		3–0	2–1	3–0
2	Uruguay (2–1)	0–3		2–1	2–1
3	Mexico (1–2)	1–2	1–2		2–1
4	Bolivia (0–3)	0–3	1–2	1–2	

	Pool B	CAN	BRA	CUB	PAR
1	Canada (3–0)		3–0	3–0	3–0
2	Brazil (2–1)	0–3		3–0	3–0
3	Cuba (1–2)	0–3	0–3		3–0
4	Paraguay (0–3)	0–3	0–3	0–3	

=== Play-offs ===
Placing	A Team	Score	B Team
Promotion	Puerto Rico	2–0	Canada
3rd–4th	Uruguay	0–3	Brazil
Relegation	Mexico	3–0	Paraguay
Relegation	Bolivia	1–2	Cuba

- Puerto Rico advanced to 2005 World Group II Play-offs.
- Paraguay and Bolivia was relegated to Group II for 2006.

== Group II ==
- Venue: Liga de Tenis de Campo de Antioquia, Medellín, Colombia (outdoor clay)
- Date: 21–23 April

The four teams played in one pool of four, with the two teams placing first and second in the pool advancing to Group I for 2006.

=== Pool ===
	Pool	CHI	COL	DOM	VEN
1	Chile (3–0)		2–1	3–0	3–0
2	Colombia (2–1)	1–2		3–0	3–0
3	Dominican Republic (1–2)	0–3	0–3		2–1
4	Venezuela (0–3)	0–3	0–3	1–2	

- Chile and Colombia advanced to Group I for 2006.

== See also ==
- Fed Cup structure
