= 2005 Fed Cup Americas Zone Group II – Pool =

The Pool of the 2005 Fed Cup Americas Zone Group II composed of four teams competing in a round robin competition. The top two teams qualified for Group I next year.

		(Colombia) COL	(Chile) CHI	(Venezuela) VEN	(Dominican Republic) DOM	RR; W–L	Set; W–L	Game; W–L	Standings
30	Colombia		1–2	3–0	3–0	2–1	14–5	100–59	2
47	Chile	2–1		3–0	3–0	3–0	16–2	105–53	1
50	Venezuela	0–3	0–3		1–2	0–3	5–16	69–118	4
69	Dominican Republic	0–3	0–3	2–1		1–2	4–16	63–107	3

== Colombia vs. Venezuela ==
Colombia
3
Liga de Tenis de Campo de Antioquia, Medellín, Colombia
21 April 2005
Red clay (outdoors)

Venezuela
0

			1	2	3
1	(Colombia) (Venezuela)	Mariana Duque Mariño; Briggitt Marcovich	4; 6	6; 0	6; 3
2	(Colombia) (Venezuela)	Catalina Castaño; Avel-Romaly Coronado	6; 1	6; 2
3	(Colombia) (Venezuela)	Catalina Castaño / Mariana Duque Mariño; Avel-Romaly Coronado / Briggitt Marcovich	6; 3	6; 3

== Chile vs. Dominican Republic ==
Chile
3
Liga de Tenis de Campo de Antioquia, Medellín, Colombia
21 April 2005
Red clay (outdoors)

Dominican Republic
0

			1	2	3
1	(Chile) (Dominican Republic)	Andrea Koch-Benvenuto; Chandra Capozzi	6; 2	6; 2
2	(Chile) (Dominican Republic)	Valentina Castro; Francesca Segarelli	6; 4	6; 2
3	(Chile) (Dominican Republic)	Andrea Koch-Benvenuto / Melisa Miranda; Natalia Báez / Kristel Izquierdo	6; 2	6; 1

== Colombia vs. Chile ==
Colombia
1
Liga de Tenis de Campo de Antioquia, Medellín, Colombia
22 April 2005
Red clay (outdoors)

Chile
2

			1	2	3
1	(Colombia) (Chile)	Mariana Duque Mariño; Andrea Koch-Benvenuto	6^{3} 7^{7}	0; 6
2	(Colombia) (Chile)	Catalina Castaño; Valentina Castro	6; 4	6; 2
3	(Colombia) (Chile)	Catalina Castaño / Mariana Duque Mariño; Valentina Castro / Andrea Koch-Benvenuto	2; 6	4; 6

== Venezuela vs. Dominican Republic ==
Venezuela
1
Liga de Tenis de Campo de Antioquia, Medellín, Colombia
22 April 2005
Red clay (outdoors)

Dominican Republic
2

			1	2	3
1	(Venezuela) (Dominican Republic)	Mariaryeni Gutiérrez; Chandra Capozzi	7; 5	4; 6	3; 6
2	(Venezuela) (Dominican Republic)	Avel-Romaly Coronado; Francesca Segarelli	6; 2	1; 6	1; 6
3	(Venezuela) (Dominican Republic)	Avel-Romaly Coronado / Briggitt Marcovich; Natalia Báez / Kristel Izquierdo	6; 4	7; 5

== Colombia vs. Dominican Republic ==
Colombia
3
Liga de Tenis de Campo de Antioquia, Medellín, Colombia
23 April 2005
Red clay (outdoors)

Dominican Republic
0

			1	2	3
1	(Colombia) (Dominican Republic)	Karen Castiblanco; Chandra Capozzi	6; 1	6; 1
2	(Colombia) (Dominican Republic)	Catalina Castaño; Francesca Segarelli	6; 0	6; 2
3	(Colombia) (Dominican Republic)	Mariana Duque Mariño / Gabriela Mejía Tenorio; Natalia Báez / Francesca Segarelli	6; 4	6; 2

== Chile vs. Venezuela ==
Chile
3
Liga de Tenis de Campo de Antioquia, Medellín, Colombia
23 April 2005
Red clay (outdoors)

Venezuela
0

			1	2	3
1	(Chile) (Venezuela)	Andrea Koch-Benvenuto; Briggitt Marcovich	6; 1	6; 2
2	(Chile) (Venezuela)	Valentina Castro; Avel-Romaly Coronado	6; 0	6; 1
3	(Chile) (Venezuela)	Valentina Castro / Melisa Miranda; Mariaryeni Gutiérrez / Briggitt Marcovich	7^{7} 6^{3}	7^{7} 6^{2}

- Chile and Colombia advanced to Group I for next year, where they both placed equal fifth.

== See also ==
- Fed Cup structure
