= 2006 Fed Cup Americas Zone Group II – play-offs =

The play-offs of the 2006 Fed Cup Americas Zone Group I were the final stages of the Group I Zonal Competition involving teams from the Americas. Using the positions determined in their pools, the seven teams faced off to determine their placing in the 2006 Fed Cup Americas Zone Group II. The top two teams advanced to Group II for the next year.

Placing	Pool A	Pool B
1	Venezuela	Dominican Republic
2	Bolivia	Paraguay
3	Panama	Bermuda

== Promotion play-offs ==
The first and second placed teams of each pool were placed against each other in two head-to-head rounds. The winner of the rounds advanced to Group II for 2007.

=== Venezuela vs. Paraguay ===
Venezuela
2
Parque del Este, Santo Domingo, Dominican Republic
20 April 2006
Hard (outdoors)

Paraguay
0

			1	2	3
1	(Venezuela) (Paraguay)	Milagros Sequera; Verónica Cepede Royg	6; 1	6; 1
2	(Venezuela) (Paraguay)	María Vento-Kabchi; Adriana Pereira	6; 2	6; 2
3	(Venezuela) (Paraguay)					not played

=== Bolivia vs. Dominican Republic ===
Bolivia
0
Parque del Este, Santo Domingo, Dominican Republic
20 April 2006
Hard (outdoors)

Dominican Republic
2

			1	2	3
1	(Bolivia) (Dominican Republic)	Marcela Rivero; Francesca Segarelli	7; 5	0; 6	2; 6
2	(Bolivia) (Dominican Republic)	Daniela Trigo; Diana Espinal	2; 6	0; 6
3	(Bolivia) (Dominican Republic)					not played

== Fifth to Sixth play-offs ==
The last-placed teams from each pool were drawn in head-to-head rounds to find the fifth and sixth placed teams.

=== Panama vs. Bermuda ===
Panama
1
Parque del Este, Santo Domingo, Dominican Republic
20 April 2006
Hard (outdoors)

Bermuda
2

			1	2	3
1	(Panama) (Bermuda)	Johanna de León; Caitlin Gordon	6; 3	6; 3
2	(Panama) (Bermuda)	Nicole Arosemena; Ashley Brooks	1; 6	6; 4	1; 6
3	(Panama) (Bermuda)	Nicole Arosemena / Johanna de León; Ashley Brooks / Jacklyn Lambert	6; 4	3; 6	6; 8

== Final Placements ==
Placing	Teams
Promoted	Venezuela
Promoted	Dominican Republic
Third	Paraguay
Third	Bolivia
Fifth	Bermuda
Sixth	Panama

- Venezuela and Dominican Republic advanced to 2007 Fed Cup Americas Zone Group I. The Dominicans placed fourth in their pool of four, and thus were relegated back to Group II for 2008, while the Venezuelans did not to compete.

== See also ==
- Fed Cup structure
