= Katariina Tuohimaa =

Finnish tennis player

- Country (sports): Finland
- Born: 28 April 1988 (age 38) Helsinki
- Height: 1.80 m (5 ft 11 in)
- Prize money: $8,798

Singles
- Career record: 26–31
- Career titles: 0
- Highest ranking: No. 730 (13 August 2007)

Grand Slam singles results
- Wimbledon Junior: 1R (2006)
- US Open Junior: 2R (2006)

Doubles
- Career record: 39–17
- Career titles: 5 ITF
- Highest ranking: No. 481 (13 August 2007)

Grand Slam doubles results
- Wimbledon Junior: 1R (2006)

Team competitions
- Fed Cup: 0–6

Katariina Tuohimaa (born 28 April 1988) is a Finnish former tennis player. In her career, Tuohimaa won five doubles titles on the ITF Women's Circuit. On 13 August 2007, she peaked at No. 481 in the doubles rankings.

Tuohimaa played six rubbers for Finland in the 2006 Fed Cup. She played college tennis at Texas Christian University.

== ITF finals ==
=== Singles (0–1) ===
Legend $10,000 tournaments	Finals by surface Hard (0–1)

Outcome	Date	Tournament	Surface	Opponent	Score
Loss	25 February 2006	Ramat HaSharon, Israel	Hard	(Czech Republic) Iveta Gerlová	6–7^{(7–9)}, 2–6

=== Doubles (5–3) ===
Legend $50,000 tournaments $25,000 tournaments $10,000 tournaments	Finals by surface Hard (1–1) Clay (3–2) Carpet (1–0)

Result	No.	Date	Tournament	Surface	Partner	Opponents	Score
Win	1.	1 October 2005	Volos, Greece	Carpet	(Italy) Nicole Clerico	(Hungary) Katalin Marosi (Brazil) Marina Tavares	6–4, 6–2
Win	2.	19 August 2006	Savitaipale, Finland	Clay	(Finland) Piia Suomalainen	(Belgium) Davinia Lobbinger (Latvia) Alise Vaidere	7–5, 6–3
Loss	1.	4 November 2006	Stockholm, Sweden	Hard (i)	(Finland) Piia Suomalainen	(Sweden) Diana Eriksson (Denmark) Hanne Skak Jensen	w/o
Win	3.	18 November 2006	Sunderland, United Kingdom	Hard (i)	(Finland) Piia Suomalainen	(Germany) Laura Haberkorn (Germany) Martina Pavelec	6–3, 6–4
Loss	2.	14 July 2007	Prokuplje, Serbia	Clay	(Slovakia) Klaudia Boczová	(Serbia) Neda Kozić (Serbia) Nataša Zorić	4–6, 5–7
Win	4.	20 July 2007	Garching, Germany	Clay	(Georgia (country)) Oksana Kalashnikova	(Austria) Franziska Klotz (Italy) Evelyn Mayr	7–5, 6–3
Win	5.	3 August 2007	Tampere, Finland	Clay	(Finland) Piia Suomalainen	(Denmark) Hanne Skak Jensen (Netherlands) Marcella Koek	6–2, 6–4
Loss	3.	7 August 2010	Savitaipale, Finland	Clay	(Norway) Nina Munch-Søgaard	(Russia) Alexandra Artamonova (Latvia) Diāna Marcinkēviča	2–6, 3–6

== Fed Cup participation ==
=== Singles ===
Edition	Round	Date	Location	Against	Surface	Opponent	W/L	Score
2006 Fed Cup	E/A Zone Group I	17 April 2006	Plovdiv, Bulgaria	Netherlands	Clay	(Netherlands) Elise Tamaëla	L	4–6, 3–6
2006 Fed Cup	E/A Zone Group I	18 April 2006	Plovdiv, Bulgaria	Luxembourg	Clay	(Luxembourg) Claudine Schaul	L	2–6, 4–6
2006 Fed Cup	E/A Zone Group I	19 April 2006	Plovdiv, Bulgaria	Slovakia	Clay	(Slovakia) Dominika Cibulková	L	2–6, 1–6

=== Doubles ===
Edition	Round	Date	Location	Against	Surface	Partner	Opponents	W/L	Score
2006 Fed Cup	E/A Zone Group I	17 April 2006	Plovdiv, Bulgaria	Netherlands	Clay	(Finland) Piia Suomalainen	(Netherlands) Marrit Boonstra (Netherlands) Brenda Schultz-McCarthy	L	1–6, 1–6
2006 Fed Cup	E/A Zone Group I	18 April 2006	Plovdiv, Bulgaria	Luxembourg	Clay	(Finland) Piia Suomalainen	(Luxembourg) Mandy Minella (Luxembourg) Claudine Schaul	L	6–4, 2–6, 2–6
2006 Fed Cup	E/A Zone Group I	19 April 2006	Plovdiv, Bulgaria	Slovakia	Clay	(Finland) Piia Suomalainen	(Slovakia) Dominika Cibulková (Slovakia) Magdaléna Rybáriková	L	3–6, 2–6
