= 2006 Fed Cup Americas Zone Group II – Pool B =

Group B of the 2006 Fed Cup Americas Zone Group II was one of two pools in the Americas Zone Group II of the 2006 Fed Cup. Three teams competed in a round robin competition, with the top team and the bottom two teams proceeding to their respective sections of the play-offs: the top teams played for advancement to the 2007 Group I.

		(Paraguay) PAR	(Dominican Republic) DOM	(Bermuda) BER	RR; W–L	Set; W–L	Game; W–L	Standings
52	Paraguay		0–3	3–0	1–1	7–6	51–54	2
59	Dominican Republic	3–0		3–0	2–0	12–1	78–26	1
79	Bermuda	0–3	0–3		0–2	0–12	23–72	3

== Paraguay vs. Bermuda ==
Paraguay
3
Parque del Este, Santo Domingo, Dominican Republic
17 April 2006
Hard (outdoors)

Bermuda
0

			1	2	3
1	(Paraguay) (Bermuda)	Verónica Cepede Royg; Jacklyn Lambert	6; 0	6; 0
2	(Paraguay) (Bermuda)	Adriana Pereira; Ashley Brooks	6; 3	6; 2
3	(Paraguay) (Bermuda)	Verónica Cepede Royg / Adriana Pereira; Ashley Brooks / Morgan Lightbourne	6; 3	6; 4

== Dominican Republic vs. Bermuda ==
Dominican Republic
3
Parque del Este, Santo Domingo, Dominican Republic
18 April 2006
Hard (outdoors)

Bermuda
0

			1	2	3
1	(Dominican Republic) (Bermuda)	Francesca Segarelli; Jacklyn Lambert	6; 1	6; 0
2	(Dominican Republic) (Bermuda)	Diana Espinal; Ashley Brooks	6; 2	6; 1
3	(Dominican Republic) (Bermuda)	Chandra Capozzi / Diana Espinal; Caitlin Gordon / Morgan Lightbourne	6; 3	6; 4

== Paraguay vs. Dominican Republic ==
Paraguay
0
Parque del Este, Santo Domingo, Dominican Republic
19 April 2006
Hard (outdoors)

Dominican Republic
3

			1	2	3
1	(Paraguay) (Dominican Republic)	Verónica Cepede Royg; Francesca Segarelli	0; 6	1; 6
2	(Paraguay) (Dominican Republic)	Adriana Pereira; Diana Espinal	4; 6	1; 6
3	(Paraguay) (Dominican Republic)	Verónica Cepede Royg / Madeleine Madelaire; Diana Espinal / Francesca Segarelli	1; 6	7^{7} 6^{4}	1; 6

== See also ==
- Fed Cup structure
