= 2006 Fed Cup Europe/Africa Zone Group I – Pool A =

International tennis competition

Group A of the 2006 Fed Cup Europe/Africa Zone Group I was one of four pools in the Europe/Africa Zone Group I of the 2006 Fed Cup. Four teams competed in a round robin competition, with the top team and the bottom team proceeding to their respective sections of the play-offs: the top team played for advancement to the World Group II Play-offs, while the bottom team faced potential relegation to Group II.

		(Slovakia) SVK	(Netherlands) NED	(Luxembourg) LUX	(Finland) FIN	RR; W–L	Set; W–L	Game; W–L	Standings
7	Slovakia		2–1	3–0	3–0	3–0	17–3	111–58	1
30	Netherlands	1–2		3–0	3–0	2–1	15–5	107–74	2
34	Luxembourg	0–3	0–3		3–0	1–2	6–14	85–100	3
47	Finland	0–3	0–3	0–3		0–3	2–18	47–118	4

== Slovakia vs. Luxembourg ==
Slovakia
3
TC Lokomotiv, Plovdiv, Bulgaria
17 April 2006
Red clay (outdoors)

Luxembourg
0

			1	2	3
1	(Slovakia) (Luxembourg)	Magdaléna Rybáriková; Mandy Minella	6; 3	6; 3
2	(Slovakia) (Luxembourg)	Daniela Hantuchová; Anne Kremer	6; 3	6; 3
3	(Slovakia) (Luxembourg)	Daniela Hantuchová / Janette Husárová; Mandy Minella / Claudine Schaul	6; 2	6; 4

== Netherlands vs. Finland ==
Netherlands
3
TC Lokomotiv, Plovdiv, Bulgaria
17 April 2006
Red clay (outdoors)

Finland
0

			1	2	3
1	(Netherlands) (Finland)	Elise Tamaëla; Katariina Tuohimaa	6; 4	6; 3
2	(Netherlands) (Finland)	Michaëlla Krajicek; Emma Laine	6; 1	6; 4
3	(Netherlands) (Finland)	Marrit Boonstra / Brenda Schultz-McCarthy; Piia Suomalainen / Katariina Tuohimaa	6; 1	6; 1

== Slovakia vs. Netherlands ==
Slovakia
2
TC Lokomotiv, Plovdiv, Bulgaria
18 April 2006
Red clay (outdoors)

Netherlands
1

			1	2	3
1	(Slovakia) (Netherlands)	Magdaléna Rybáriková; Elise Tamaëla	6; 3	6; 2
2	(Slovakia) (Netherlands)	Daniela Hantuchová; Michaëlla Krajicek	4; 6	7^{7} 6^{5}	6; 2
3	(Slovakia) (Netherlands)	Dominika Cibulková / Janette Husárová; Marrit Boonstra / Brenda Schultz-McCarthy	6; 1	0; 6	4; 6

== Luxembourg vs. Finland ==
Luxembourg
3
TC Lokomotiv, Plovdiv, Bulgaria
18 April 2006
Red clay (outdoors)

Finland
0

			1	2	3
1	(Luxembourg) (Finland)	Claudine Schaul; Katariina Tuohimaa	6; 2	6; 4
2	(Luxembourg) (Finland)	Anne Kremer; Piia Suomalainen	6^{0} 7^{7}	6; 2	6; 0
3	(Luxembourg) (Finland)	Mandy Minella / Claudine Schaul; Piia Suomalainen / Katariina Tuohimaa	4; 6	6; 2	6; 2

== Slovakia vs. Finland ==
Slovakia
3
TC Lokomotiv, Plovdiv, Bulgaria
19 April 2006
Red clay (outdoors)

Finland
0

			1	2	3
1	(Slovakia) (Finland)	Dominika Cibulková; Katariina Tuohimaa	6; 2	6; 1
2	(Slovakia) (Finland)	Magdaléna Rybáriková; Piia Suomalainen	6; 0	6; 0
3	(Slovakia) (Finland)	Dominika Cibulková / Magdaléna Rybáriková; Piia Suomalainen / Katariina Tuohimaa	6; 3	6; 2

== Netherlands vs. Luxembourg ==
Netherlands
3
TC Lokomotiv, Plovdiv, Bulgaria
19 April 2006
Red clay (outdoors)

Luxembourg
0

			1	2	3
1	(Netherlands) (Luxembourg)	Elise Tamaëla; Claudine Schaul	7; 5	6; 3
2	(Netherlands) (Luxembourg)	Michaëlla Krajicek; Anne Kremer	6; 1	6; 1
3	(Netherlands) (Luxembourg)	Marrit Boonstra / Brenda Schultz-McCarthy; Mandy Minella / Lynn Philippe	7; 5	7^{7} 6^{4}

== See also ==
- Fed Cup structure
