= 2006 Fed Cup Americas Zone Group I – play-offs =

Tennis competition play-offs

The play-offs of the 2006 Fed Cup Americas Zone Group I were the final stages of the Group I Zonal Competition involving teams from the Americas. Using the positions determined in their pools, the eight teams faced off to determine their placing in the 2006 Fed Cup Americas Zone Group I, the top countries of each pool played for first to second, while the bottom two of each pool competed for fifth to eighth. The team that ended up placing first overall advanced to World Group II play-offs, whilst those coming in seventh were relegated down to Group II for the next year.

| Placing | Pool A | Pool B |
|---|---|---|
| 1 | Canada | Brazil |
| 2 | Mexico | Puerto Rico |
| 3 | Chile | Colombia |
| 4 | Uruguay | Cuba |

== Promotion play-offs ==
The first placed teams of each pool were placed against each other in two head-to-head rounds. The winner of the rounds advanced to the World Group II play-offs, where they would get a chance to advance to the World Group II for next year.

=== Canada vs. Brazil ===
Canada
3
Club Campestre de Medellín, Medellín, Colombia
22 April 2006
Red clay (outdoors)

Brazil
0

| | | | 1 | 2 | 3 |
|---|---|---|---|---|---|---|
| 1 | (Canada) (Brazil) | Stéphanie Dubois; Jenifer Widjaja | 3; 6 | 6; 4 | 7; 5 |
| 2 | (Canada) (Brazil) | Aleksandra Wozniak; Maria Fernanda Alves | 6; 4 | 6; 0 |
| 3 | (Canada) (Brazil) | Sharon Fichman / Aleksandra Wozniak; Larissa Carvalho / Letícia Sobral | 3; 0 | | | retired |

== Third to Fourth play-off ==
The second placed teams of each pool were placed against each other in a tie. The winner of the tie was allocated third place in the Group while the loser was allocated fourth.

=== Mexico vs. Puerto Rico ===
Mexico
1
Club Campestre de Medellín, Medellín, Colombia
22 April 2006
Red clay (outdoors)

Puerto Rico
2

| | | | 1 | 2 | 3 |
|---|---|---|---|---|---|
| 1 | (Mexico) (Puerto Rico) | Erika Clarke; Vilmarie Castellvi | 1; 6 | 1; 6 |
| 2 | (Mexico) (Puerto Rico) | Daniela Múñoz Gallegos; Kristina Brandi | 2; 6 | 2; 6 |
| 3 | (Mexico) (Puerto Rico) | Erika Clarke / Lorena Villalobos Cruz; Kristina Brandi / Vilmarie Castellvi | 6; 1 | 7; 5 |

== Relegation play-offs ==
The last and second-to-last placed teams of each pool were placed against each other in two head-to-head rounds. The losing team of the rounds were relegated to Group II for next year.

=== Chile vs. Cuba ===
Chile
2
Club Campestre de Medellín, Medellín, Colombia
22 April 2006
Red clay (outdoors)

Cuba
0

| | | | 1 | 2 | 3 |
|---|---|---|---|---|---|---|
| 1 | (Chile) (Cuba) | Valentina Castro; Yanet Núñez Mojarena | 6; 1 | 1; 6 | 6; 3 |
| 2 | (Chile) (Cuba) | Andrea Koch-Benvenuto; Yamile Fors Guerra | 7^{7} 6^{3} | 6; 4 |
| 3 | (Chile) (Cuba) | Valentina Castro / Andrea Koch-Benvenuto; Yamile Fors Guerra / Yanet Núñez Mojarena | | | | not played |

=== Uruguay vs. Colombia ===
Uruguay
1
Club Campestre de Medellín, Medellín, Colombia
22 April 2006
Red clay (outdoors)

Colombia
2

| | | | 1 | 2 | 3 |
|---|---|---|---|---|---|
| 1 | (Uruguay) (Colombia) | María Eugenia Roca Recarey; Viky Núñez Fuentes | 7^{7} 6^{5} | 6; 2 |
| 2 | (Uruguay) (Colombia) | Estefanía Craciun; Mariana Duque Mariño | 1; 6 | 6; 1 | 4; 6 |
| 3 | (Uruguay) (Colombia) | Estefanía Craciun / Ana Lucía Migliarini de León; Mariana Duque Mariño / Viky Núñez Fuentes | 6; 4 | 4; 6 | 5; 7 |

== Final Placements ==
| Placing | Teams |
| Promoted | Canada |
| Second | Brazil |
| Third | Puerto Rico |
| Fourth | Mexico |
| Fifth | Chile |
| Fifth | Colombia |
| Relegated | Cuba |
| Relegated | Uruguay |

- Canada advanced to the World Group II play-offs, and were drawn against Argentina, where they won 3–2. The team thus advanced to World Group II for the next year.
- Cuba and Uruguay were relegated down to Americas Zone Group II for the next year. The Uruguayans placed equal first, and thus advanced back to Group I for 2008, while the Cubans did not compete.

== See also ==
- Fed Cup structure
