= 2005 Fed Cup Americas Zone Group I – Pool B =

Group B of the 2005 Fed Cup Americas Zone Group I was one of two pools in the Americas Zone Group I of the 2005 Fed Cup. Four teams competed in a round robin competition, with the top team and the bottom two teams proceeding to their respective sections of the play-offs: the top teams played for advancement to the World Group II Play-offs, while the bottom teams faced potential relegation to Group II.

		(Canada) CAN	(Brazil) BRA	(Cuba) CUB	(Paraguay) PAR	RR; W–L	Set; W–L	Game; W–L	Standings
16	Canada		3–0	3–0	2–1	3–0	18–3	117–49	1
20	Brazil	0–3		3–0	3–0	2–1	14–6	96–59	2
40	Cuba	0–3	0–3		3–0	1–2	7–12	76–93	3
45	Paraguay	0–3	0–3	0–3		0–3	0–18	32–109	4

== Canada vs. Cuba ==
Canada
3
Carrasco Lawn Tennis Club, Montevideo, Uruguay
20 April 2005
Red clay (outdoors)

Cuba
0

			1	2	3
1	(Canada) (Cuba)	Aleksandra Wozniak; Yanet Núñez Mojarena	6; 3	6; 2
2	(Canada) (Cuba)	Marie-Ève Pelletier; Yamile Fors Guerra	6; 2	4; 6	7; 5
3	(Canada) (Cuba)	Stéphanie Dubois / Aleksandra Wozniak; Lumay Díaz Hernández / Yanet Núñez Mojarena	6; 3	6; 4

== Brazil vs. Paraguay ==
Brazil
3
Carrasco Lawn Tennis Club, Montevideo, Uruguay
20 April 2005
Red clay (outdoors)

Paraguay
0

			1	2	3
1	(Brazil) (Paraguay)	Larissa Carvalho; Amanda Melgarejo	6; 0	6; 0
2	(Brazil) (Paraguay)	Jenifer Widjaja; Madeleine Madelaire	6; 1	6; 1
3	(Brazil) (Paraguay)	Maria Fernanda Alves / Joana Cortez; Paola Doldán González / Sarah Tami Masi	6; 0	6; 3

== Canada vs. Brazil ==
Canada
3
Carrasco Lawn Tennis Club, Montevideo, Uruguay
21 April 2005
Red clay (outdoors)

Brazil
0

			1	2	3
1	(Canada) (Brazil)	Aleksandra Wozniak; Larissa Carvalho	3; 6	6; 1	6; 0
2	(Canada) (Brazil)	Marie-Ève Pelletier; Maria Fernanda Alves	0; 6	6; 4	7; 5
3	(Canada) (Brazil)	Stéphanie Dubois / Aleksandra Wozniak; Joana Cortez / Jenifer Widjaja	6; 1	6; 1

== Cuba vs. Paraguay ==
Cuba
3
Carrasco Lawn Tennis Club, Montevideo, Uruguay
21 April 2005
Red clay (outdoors)

Paraguay
0

			1	2	3
1	(Cuba) (Paraguay)	Yanet Núñez Mojarena; Paola Doldán González	6; 1	6; 3
2	(Cuba) (Paraguay)	Yamile Fors Guerra; Sarah Tami Masi	7^{7} 6^{4}	6; 2
3	(Cuba) (Paraguay)	Yamile Fors Guerra / Yanet Núñez Mojarena; Paola Doldán González / Amanda Melgarejo	6; 4	6; 0

== Canada vs. Paraguay ==
Canada
3
Carrasco Lawn Tennis Club, Montevideo, Uruguay
22 April 2005
Red clay (outdoors)

Paraguay
0

			1	2	3
1	(Canada) (Paraguay)	Sharon Fichman; Madeleine Madelaire	6; 1	6; 2
2	(Canada) (Paraguay)	Stéphanie Dubois; Paola Doldán González	6; 0	6; 2
3	(Canada) (Paraguay)	Stéphanie Dubois / Aleksandra Wozniak; Amanda Melgarejo / Sarah Tami Masi	6; 4	6; 2

== Brazil vs. Cuba ==
Brazil
3
Carrasco Lawn Tennis Club, Montevideo, Uruguay
22 April 2005
Red clay (outdoors)

Cuba
0

			1	2	3
1	(Brazil) (Cuba)	Larissa Carvalho; Yanet Núñez Mojarena	6; 2	6; 1
2	(Brazil) (Cuba)	Jenifer Widjaja; Yamile Fors Guerra	6; 2	6; 2
3	(Brazil) (Cuba)	Maria Fernanda Alves / Joana Cortez; Yamile Fors Guerra / Yanet Núñez Mojarena	6; 4	6; 3

== See also ==
- Fed Cup structure
