= 2006 Fed Cup Europe/Africa Zone Group III – Pool A =

International tennis competition

Group A of the 2006 Fed Cup Europe/Africa Zone Group III was one of two pools in the Europe/Africa zone of the 2006 Fed Cup. Five teams competed in a round robin competition, with the top team advanced to Group I for 2007.

		(Turkey) TUR	(Norway) NOR	(Tunisia) TUN	(Moldova) MDA	(Iceland) ISL	Match; W–L	Set; W–L	Game; W–L	Standings
61	Turkey		0–2	2–1	2–0	3–0	3–1	13–6	102–59	2
71	Norway	2–0		2–1	2–0	2–0	4–0	16–2	100–43	1
74	Tunisia	1–2	1–2		2–0	2–1	2–2	13–9	105–83	3
79	Moldova	0–2	0–2	0–2		2–0	1–3	6–14	58–95	4
83	Iceland	0–3	0–2	1–2	0–2		0–4	1–18	28–123	5

== Norway vs. Moldova ==
Norway
2
Club Ali Bey, Manavgat, Antalya, Turkey
26 April 2006
Red clay (outdoors)

Moldova
0

			1	2	3
1	(Norway) (Moldova)	Nina Munch-Søgaard; Olga Ćosić	6; 0	6; 1
2	(Norway) (Moldova)	Karoline Borgersen; Julia Helbet	6; 1	6; 0
3	(Norway) (Moldova)					not played

== Turkey vs. Tunisia ==
Turkey
2
Club Ali Bey, Manavgat, Antalya, Turkey
26 April 2006
Red clay (outdoors)

Tunisia
1

			1	2	3
1	(Turkey) (Tunisia)	Çağla Büyükakçay; Olfa Dhaoui	6; 1	7; 5
2	(Turkey) (Tunisia)	Pemra Özgen; Selima Sfar	6^{1} 7^{7}	2; 6
3	(Turkey) (Tunisia)	Pemra Özgen / İpek Şenoğlu; Olfa Dhaoui / Selima Sfar	7; 5	3; 1		retired

== Turkey vs. Moldova ==
Turkey
2
Club Ali Bey, Manavgat, Antalya, Turkey
26 April 2006
Red clay (outdoors)

Moldova
0

			1	2	3
1	(Turkey) (Moldova)	İpek Şenoğlu; Olga Ćosić	6; 2	6; 2
2	(Turkey) (Moldova)	Pemra Özgen; Stanislava Cozirscaia	6; 1	6; 1
3	(Turkey) (Moldova)					not played

== Norway vs. Tunisia ==
Norway
2
Club Ali Bey, Manavgat, Antalya, Turkey
26 April 2006
Red clay (outdoors)

Tunisia
1

			1	2	3
1	(Norway) (Tunisia)	Nina Munch-Søgaard; Olfa Dhaoui	6; 4	6; 4
2	(Norway) (Tunisia)	Karoline Borgersen; Selima Sfar	3; 6	1; 6
3	(Norway) (Tunisia)	Karoline Borgersen / Nina Munch-Søgaard; Olfa Dhaoui / Selima Sfar	6; 1	6; 1

== Norway vs. Iceland ==
Norway
2
Club Ali Bey, Manavgat, Antalya, Turkey
27 April 2006
Red clay (outdoors)

Iceland
0

			1	2	3
1	(Norway) (Iceland)	Karoline Steiro; Sigurlaug Sigurðardóttir	6; 2	6; 1
2	(Norway) (Iceland)	Idunn Hertzberg; Iris Staub	6; 3	6; 2
3	(Norway) (Iceland)					not played

== Moldova vs. Iceland ==
Moldova
2
Club Ali Bey, Manavgat, Antalya, Turkey
27 April 2006
Red clay (outdoors)

Iceland
0

			1	2	3
1	(Moldova) (Iceland)	Olga Ćosić; Sigurlaug Sigurðardóttir	6; 0	6; 1
2	(Moldova) (Iceland)	Julia Helbet; Iris Staub	7; 5	4; 6	6; 1
3	(Moldova) (Iceland)					not played

== Turkey vs. Iceland ==
Turkey
3
Club Ali Bey, Manavgat, Antalya, Turkey
28 April 2006
Red clay (outdoors)

Iceland
0

			1	2	3
1	(Turkey) (Iceland)	İpek Şenoğlu; Sigurlaug Sigurðardóttir	6; 1	6; 1
2	(Turkey) (Iceland)	Pemra Özgen; Iris Staub	6; 0	6; 2
3	(Turkey) (Iceland)	Çağla Büyükakçay / Pemra Özgen; Sigurlaug Sigurðardóttir / Iris Staub	6; 0	6; 0

== Tunisia vs. Moldova ==
Tunisia
2
Club Ali Bey, Manavgat, Antalya, Turkey
28 April 2006
Red clay (outdoors)

Moldova
1

			1	2	3
1	(Tunisia) (Moldova)	Amel Benhaj; Stanislava Cozirscaia	6; 3	4; 6	0; 6
2	(Tunisia) (Moldova)	Selima Sfar; Julia Helbet	6; 3	6; 0
3	(Tunisia) (Moldova)	Olfa Dhaoui / Selima Sfar; Olga Ćosić / Julia Helbet	6; 1	6; 2

== Turkey vs. Norway ==
Turkey
0
Club Ali Bey, Manavgat, Antalya, Turkey
29 April 2006
Red clay (outdoors)

Norway
2

			1	2	3
1	(Turkey) (Norway)	İpek Şenoğlu; Nina Munch-Søgaard	2; 6	2; 6
2	(Turkey) (Norway)	Pemra Özgen; Karoline Borgersen	4; 6	3; 6
3	(Turkey) (Norway)					not played

== Tunisia vs. Iceland ==
Tunisia
2
Club Ali Bey, Manavgat, Antalya, Turkey
29 April 2006
Red clay (outdoors)

Iceland
0

			1	2	3
1	(Tunisia) (Iceland)	Olfa Dhaoui; Sigurlaug Sigurðardóttir	6; 1	6; 0
2	(Tunisia) (Iceland)	Selima Sfar; Iris Staub	6; 2	6; 0
3	(Tunisia) (Iceland)					not played

- Norway placed first in this group and thus advanced to Group I for 2007, where they placed fourth in their pool of four and thus were relegated back to Group II for 2008.

== See also ==
- Fed Cup structure
