= 2005 Fed Cup Americas Zone Group I – Pool A =

Group A of the 2005 Fed Cup Americas Zone Group I was one of two pools in the Americas Zone Group I of the 2005 Fed Cup. Four teams competed in a round robin competition, with the top team and the bottom two teams proceeding to their respective sections of the play-offs: the top teams played for advancement to the World Group II Play-offs, while the bottom teams faced potential relegation to Group II.

		(Mexico) MEX	(Uruguay) URU	(Puerto Rico) PUR	(Bolivia) BOL	RR; W–L	Set; W–L	Game; W–L	Standings
26	Mexico		1–2	1–2	2–1	1–2	10–12	101–110	3
43	Uruguay	2–1		0–3	2–1	2–1	9–11	94–99	2
44	Puerto Rico	2–1	3–0		3–0	3–0	16–3	94–74	1
48	Bolivia	1–2	1–2	0–3		0–3	6–15	75–115	4

== Mexico vs. Bolivia ==
Mexico
2
Carrasco Lawn Tennis Club, Montevideo, Uruguay
20 April 2005
Red clay (outdoors)

Bolivia
1

			1	2	3
1	(Mexico) (Bolivia)	Marcela Arroyo; María Irene Squillaci Sandoval	6; 2	7^{7} 6^{3}
2	(Mexico) (Bolivia)	Melissa Torres Sandoval; María Fernanda Álvarez Terán	6; 2	5; 7	6; 1
3	(Mexico) (Bolivia)	Erika Clarke / Daniela Múñoz Gallegos; María Fernanda Álvarez Terán / María Irene Squillaci Sandoval	4; 6	6; 3	5; 7

== Uruguay vs. Puerto Rico ==
Uruguay
0
Carrasco Lawn Tennis Club, Montevideo, Uruguay
20 April 2005
Red clay (outdoors)

Puerto Rico
3

			1	2	3
1	(Uruguay) (Puerto Rico)	Estefanía Craciun; Vilmarie Castellvi	0; 6	6^{4} 7^{7}
2	(Uruguay) (Puerto Rico)	Ana Lucía Migliarini de León; Kristina Brandi	3; 6	3; 6
3	(Uruguay) (Puerto Rico)	Ana Lucía Migliarini de León / María Eugenia Roca Recarey; Kristina Brandi / Vilmarie Castellvi	5; 7	4; 6

== Mexico vs. Puerto Rico ==
Mexico
1
Carrasco Lawn Tennis Club, Montevideo, Uruguay
21 April 2005
Red clay (outdoors)

Puerto Rico
2

			1	2	3
1	(Mexico) (Puerto Rico)	Daniela Múñoz Gallegos; Vilmarie Castellvi	2; 6	3; 6
2	(Mexico) (Puerto Rico)	Melissa Torres Sandoval; Kristina Brandi	0; 6	2; 6
3	(Mexico) (Puerto Rico)	Marcela Arroyo / Melissa Torres Sandoval; Kristina Brandi / Vilmarie Castellvi	7^{7} 6^{5}	6; 4

== Uruguay vs. Bolivia ==
Uruguay
2
Carrasco Lawn Tennis Club, Montevideo, Uruguay
21 April 2005
Red clay (outdoors)

Bolivia
1

			1	2	3
1	(Uruguay) (Bolivia)	Estefanía Craciun; María Irene Squillaci Sandoval	6; 1	6; 3
2	(Uruguay) (Bolivia)	Ana Lucía Migliarini de León; María Fernanda Álvarez Terán	2; 6	5; 7
3	(Uruguay) (Bolivia)	Estefanía Craciun / Ana Lucía Migliarini de León; María Fernanda Álvarez Terán / María Irene Squillaci Sandoval	6; 4	6; 4

== Mexico vs. Uruguay ==
Mexico
1
Carrasco Lawn Tennis Club, Montevideo, Uruguay
22 April 2005
Red clay (outdoors)

Uruguay
2

			1	2	3
1	(Mexico) (Uruguay)	Daniela Múñoz Gallegos; María Eugenia Roca Recarey	4; 6	5; 7
2	(Mexico) (Uruguay)	Melissa Torres Sandoval; Estefanía Craciun	3; 6	6; 2	7; 5
3	(Mexico) (Uruguay)	Marcela Arroyo / Melissa Torres Sandoval; Estefanía Craciun / Ana Lucía Migliarini de León	6; 4	1; 6	4; 6

== Puerto Rico vs. Bolivia ==
Puerto Rico
3
Carrasco Lawn Tennis Club, Montevideo, Uruguay
22 April 2005
Red clay (outdoors)

Bolivia
0

			1	2	3
1	(Puerto Rico) (Bolivia)	Vilmarie Castellvi; Celina Grissi	6; 0	6; 2
2	(Puerto Rico) (Bolivia)	Kristina Brandi; María Fernanda Álvarez Terán	6; 0	3; 6	6; 4
3	(Puerto Rico) (Bolivia)	Vilmarie Castellvi / Jessica Roland-Rosario; Celina Grissi / María Irene Squillaci Sandoval	6; 2	6; 2

== See also ==
- Fed Cup structure
