= Tennis at the 2014 Central American and Caribbean Games =

Tennis competition

- Venue: Las Palmas Racquet club
- Location: Veracruz, Mexico
- Dates: 24-30 November

The tennis competition at the 2014 Central American and Caribbean Games was held in Veracruz, Mexico.

The tournament was scheduled to be held from 24–30 November at the Las Palmas Racquet club.

== Medal summary ==
=== Men's events ===
Event	Gold	Silver	Bronze
Singles	Víctor Estrella Burgos (DOM)	José Hernández (DOM)	Nicolás Barrientos (COL)
Doubles	Colombia (COL); Juan Carlos Spir; Eduardo Struvay	Mexico (MEX); Santiago González; César Ramírez	Venezuela (VEN); Roberto Maytín; David Souto
Team	Colombia (COL); Nicolás Barrientos; Eduardo Struvay; Juan Carlos Spir	Guatemala (GUA); Christopher Díaz Figueroa; Wilfredo González; Stefan González; Christopher Vleeming	Venezuela (VEN); Luis David Martínez; David Souto; Jesús Bandrés; Roberto Maytín

=== Women's events ===
Event	Gold	Silver	Bronze
Singles	Monica Puig (PUR)	Ana Sofía Sánchez (MEX)	Francesca Segarelli (DOM)
Doubles	Mexico (MEX); Victoria Rodríguez; Marcela Zacarías	Venezuela (VEN); Andrea Gámiz; Adriana Pérez	Guatemala (GUA); Melissa Morales; Daniela Schippers
Team	Mexico (MEX); Ana Sofía Sánchez; Marcela Zacarías; Victoria Rodríguez; Renata Zarazúa	Venezuela (VEN); Adriana Pérez; Andrea Gámiz; Mariaryeni Gutiérrez; Aymet Uzcátegui	Guatemala (GUA); Melissa Morales; Andrea Weedon; Daniela Schippers; Rebeca Reyes

=== Mixed event ===
Event	Gold	Silver	Bronze
Doubles	Mexico (MEX); Marcela Zacarías; Santiago González	Venezuela (VEN); Adriana Pérez; David Souto	Dominican Republic (DOM) Francesca Segarelli; Víctor Estrella Burgos

== Men's singles ==
=== Seeds ===
1. (Dominican Republic) Víctor Estrella Burgos (champion)
2. (El Salvador) Marcelo Arévalo (quarterfinals)
3. (Colombia) Nicolás Barrientos (semifinals)
4. (Dominican Republic) José Hernández-Fernández (final)
5. (Barbados) Darian King (quarterfinals)
6. (Guatemala) Christopher Díaz Figueroa (quarterfinals)
7. (Venezuela) Luis David Martínez (first round)
8. (Mexico) Daniel Garza (semifinals)

=== Key ===
- Q = Qualifier
- WC = Wild card
- LL = Lucky loser
- Alt = Alternate
- SE = Special exempt
- PR = Protected ranking
- ITF = ITF entry
- JE = Junior exempt
- w/o = Walkover
- r = Retired
- d = Defaulted
- SR = Special ranking

=== Finals ===
Semifinals
1	(Dominican Republic) Víctor Estrella Burgos	7	6
3	(Colombia) Nicolás Barrientos	6	2
4	(Dominican Republic) José Hernández-Fernández	6	6
8	(Mexico) Daniel Garza	2	2

Gold medal match
1	(Dominican Republic) Víctor Estrella Burgos	6	6
4	(Dominican Republic) José Hernández-Fernández	4	3
Bronze medal match
3	(Colombia) Nicolás Barrientos	6	6
8	(Mexico) Daniel Garza	4	2

=== Top half ===
First round
(Grenada) Yannik James	6	6
(Antigua and Barbuda) Kyle Joseph	0	2
(Jamaica) Dominic Pagon	4	3
(Guatemala) Wilfredo González	6	6
(Honduras) Alejandro Obando	0	1
5	(Barbados) Darian King	6	6
(Panama) Alejandro Arrue	0	0
(Costa Rica) Ignaci Roca	6	6
(The Bahamas) Philip Wilbert Major	2	5
(Cuba) Omar Hernández	6	7
(Mexico) César Ramírez	6	6
7	(Venezuela) Luis David Martínez	3	3

Second round
1	(Dominican Republic) Víctor Estrella Burgos	6	6
(Grenada) Yannik James	4	1
(Guatemala) Wilfredo González	4	4
5	(Barbados) Darian King	6	6
3	(Colombia) Nicolás Barrientos	6	6
(Costa Rica) Ignaci Roca	1	4
(Cuba) Omar Hernández	4	2
(Mexico) César Ramírez	6	6

Quarterfinals
1	(Dominican Republic) Víctor Estrella Burgos	6	3	6
5	(Barbados) Darian King	0	6	3
3	(Colombia) Nicolás Barrientos	7	6
(Mexico) César Ramírez	5	3

Semifinals
1	(Dominican Republic) Víctor Estrella Burgos	7	6
3	(Colombia) Nicolás Barrientos	6	2

=== Bottom half ===
First round
6	(Guatemala) Christopher Díaz Figueroa	6	6
(Jamaica) Davian Burrell	1	0
(Honduras) Keny Turcios	7	2	[6]
(Puerto Rico) Alex Llompart	5	6	[10]
(Barbados) Haydn Lewis	7	4	[13]
(Cuba) William Dorantes	6	6	[11]
(Antigua and Barbuda) Shakir Elvin	0	2
4	(Dominican Republic) José Hernández-Fernández	6	6
8	(Mexico) Daniel Garza	6	6
(Venezuela) Jesús Bandrés	4	2
(Panama) Walder Espinoza	3	4
(The Bahamas) Justin Lunn	6	6
(Grenada) Shem Alexis	6	5	[4]
(Costa Rica) Pablo Núñez	4	7	[10]

Second round
6	(Guatemala) Christopher Díaz Figueroa	7	1
(Puerto Rico) Alex Llompart	6	0^{r}
(Barbados) Haydn Lewis	5	2
4	(Dominican Republic) José Hernández-Fernández	7	6
8	(Mexico) Daniel Garza	6	6
(The Bahamas) Justin Lunn	4	1
(Costa Rica) Pablo Núñez	2	2
2	(El Salvador) Marcelo Arévalo	6	6

Quarterfinals
6	(Guatemala) Christopher Díaz Figueroa	7	6	3
4	(Dominican Republic) José Hernández-Fernández	6	7	6
8	(Mexico) Daniel Garza	7	7
2	(El Salvador) Marcelo Arévalo	6	6

Semifinals
4	(Dominican Republic) José Hernández-Fernández	6	6
8	(Mexico) Daniel Garza	2	2

== Women's singles ==
=== Seeds ===
1. (Puerto Rico) Monica Puig (champion)
2. (Mexico) Ana Sofía Sánchez (final)
3. (Venezuela) Andrea Gámiz (quarterfinals)
4. (Mexico) Victoria Rodríguez (semifinals)
5. (Dominican Republic) Francesca Segarelli (semifinals)
6. (Venezuela) Mariaryeni Gutiérrez (quarterfinals)

=== Key ===
- Q = Qualifier
- WC = Wild card
- LL = Lucky loser
- Alt = Alternate
- SE = Special exempt
- PR = Protected ranking
- ITF = ITF entry
- JE = Junior exempt
- w/o = Walkover
- r = Retired
- d = Defaulted
- SR = Special ranking

=== Finals ===
Semifinals
1	(Puerto Rico) Monica Puig	6	6
4	(Mexico) Victoria Rodríguez	2	3
5	(Dominican Republic) Francesca Segarelli	3	4
2	(Mexico) Ana Sofía Sánchez	6	6

Gold medal match
1	(Puerto Rico) Monica Puig	6	6
2	(Mexico) Ana Sofía Sánchez	2	1
Bronze medal match
4	(Mexico) Victoria Rodríguez	4	4
5	(Dominican Republic) Francesca Segarelli	6	6

=== Top half ===
First round
(Honduras) Zulema Zelaya	7	2	[0]
(Cuba) Claudia Carreras	5	6	[10]
(Costa Rica) Ariana Rahmanparast	7	6
(Dominican Republic) Michelle Valdez	6	3
(Guatemala) Daniela Schippers	6	6
(The Bahamas) Danielle Andrea Thompson	1	3

Second round
1	(Puerto Rico) Monica Puig	6	6
(Cuba) Claudia Carreras	1	0
(Costa Rica) Ariana Rahmanparast	6	6
(Antigua and Barbuda) D'Jeri Raymond	1	1
4	(Mexico) Victoria Rodríguez	6	6
(Guatemala) Daniela Schippers	2	1
(Grenada) Akilah James	2	2
6	(Venezuela) Mariaryeni Gutiérrez	6	6

Quarterfinals
1	(Puerto Rico) Monica Puig	6	6
(Costa Rica) Ariana Rahmanparast	2	1
4	(Mexico) Victoria Rodríguez	6	6
6	(Venezuela) Mariaryeni Gutiérrez	2	3

Semifinals
1	(Puerto Rico) Monica Puig	6	6
4	(Mexico) Victoria Rodríguez	2	3

=== Bottom half ===
First round
(Cuba) Yenise Machado	6	6
(Antigua and Barbuda) Isoke Perry	3	1
(Saint Lucia) Julia d'Auvergne	0	2
(The Bahamas) Kerrie Cartwright	6	6
(Honduras) Daniela Obando	6	6
(Grenada) Lois Alexis	4	1
(Guatemala) Andrea Weedon	3	7	[10]
(El Salvador) Paula Artiga	6	5	[6]

Second round
5	(Dominican Republic) Francesca Segarelli	6	7
(Cuba) Yenise Machado	3	5
(The Bahamas) Kerrie Cartwright	2	0
3	(Venezuela) Andrea Gámiz	6	6
(Costa Rica) Andrea Brenes	2	3
(Honduras) Daniela Obando	6	6
(Guatemala) Andrea Weedon	3	2
2	(Mexico) Ana Sofía Sánchez	6	6

Quarterfinals
5	(Dominican Republic) Francesca Segarelli	2	7	6
3	(Venezuela) Andrea Gámiz	6	6	0
(Honduras) Daniela Obando	0	0
2	(Mexico) Ana Sofía Sánchez	6	6

Semifinals
5	(Dominican Republic) Francesca Segarelli	3	4
2	(Mexico) Ana Sofía Sánchez	6	6

== Men's doubles ==
=== Seeds ===
1. (Mexico) Santiago González / (Mexico) César Ramírez (final)
2. (Colombia) Juan Carlos Spir / (Colombia) Eduardo Struvay (champions)
3. (Venezuela) Roberto Maytín / (Venezuela) David Souto (semifinals)

=== Key ===
- Q = Qualifier
- WC = Wild card
- LL = Lucky loser
- Alt = Alternate
- SE = Special exempt
- PR = Protected ranking
- ITF = ITF entry
- JE = Junior exempt
- w/o = Walkover
- r = Retired
- d = Defaulted
- SR = Special ranking

=== Draw ===
First round
1	(Mexico) Santiago González (Mexico) César Ramírez
Bye
(The Bahamas) Philip Wilbert Major (The Bahamas) Marvin Rolle	6	6
(Antigua and Barbuda) Shakir Elvin (Antigua and Barbuda) Kyle Joseph	1	1
(Guatemala) Wilfredo Gonzalez (Guatemala) Stefan Emilio Gonzalez	3	2
(Dominican Republic) Peter Bertran (Dominican Republic) José Hernández	6	6
(Cuba) William Dorantes Sanchez (Cuba) Yasiel Estrada	1	1
(Barbados) Darian King (Barbados) Haydn Lewis	6	6
(Panama) Luis Gómez (Panama) José Gilbert Gómez	4	4
(Costa Rica) Alvaro Daniel Riveros (Costa Rica) Julian Saborio	6	6
(Honduras) Alejandro Obando (Honduras) Keny Turcios	2	3
3	(Venezuela) Roberto Maytín (Venezuela) David Souto	6	6
(Grenada) Yannik James (Grenada) Aaron Moses	2	3
(Jamaica) Davian Burrell (Jamaica) Dominic Pagon	6	6
Bye
2	(Colombia) Juan Carlos Spir (Colombia) Eduardo Struvay

Quarterfinals
1	(Mexico) Santiago González (Mexico) César Ramírez	6	6
(The Bahamas) Philip Wilbert Major (The Bahamas) Marvin Rolle	2	4
(Dominican Republic) Peter Bertran (Dominican Republic) José Hernández	5	3
(Barbados) Darian King (Barbados) Haydn Lewis	7	6
(Costa Rica) Alvaro Daniel Riveros (Costa Rica) Julian Saborio	3	1
3	(Venezuela) Roberto Maytín (Venezuela) David Souto	6	6
(Jamaica) Davian Burrell (Jamaica) Dominic Pagon	1	2
2	(Colombia) Juan Carlos Spir (Colombia) Eduardo Struvay	6	6

Semifinals
1	(Mexico) Santiago González (Mexico) César Ramírez	6	6
(Barbados) Darian King (Barbados) Haydn Lewis	4	1
3	(Venezuela) Roberto Maytín (Venezuela) David Souto	7	3	[5]
2	(Colombia) Juan Carlos Spir (Colombia) Eduardo Struvay	6	6	[10]

Gold medal match
1	(Mexico) Santiago González (Mexico) César Ramírez	5	3
2	(Colombia) Juan Carlos Spir (Colombia) Eduardo Struvay	7	6
Bronze medal match
(Barbados) Darian King (Barbados) Haydn Lewis	7	2	[7]
3	(Venezuela) Roberto Maytín (Venezuela) David Souto	6	6	[10]

== Women's doubles ==
=== Seeds ===
1. (Venezuela) Andrea Gámiz / (Venezuela) Adriana Pérez (final)
2. (Mexico) Victoria Rodríguez / (Mexico) Marcela Zacarías (champions)

=== Key ===
- Q = Qualifier
- WC = Wild card
- LL = Lucky loser
- Alt = Alternate
- SE = Special exempt
- PR = Protected ranking
- ITF = ITF entry
- JE = Junior exempt
- w/o = Walkover
- r = Retired
- d = Defaulted
- SR = Special ranking

=== Draw ===
First round
1	(Venezuela) Andrea Gámiz (Venezuela) Adriana Pérez
Bye
(Grenada) Lois Alexis (Grenada) Akilah James
Bye
(Dominican Republic) Glenny Cepeda (Dominican Republic) Karla Portalatin
Bye
(The Bahamas) Kerrie Cartwright (The Bahamas) Larikah Russell
Bye
(Antigua and Barbuda) Isoke Perry (Antigua and Barbuda) D'Jeri Raymond	0	1
(Guatemala) Melissa Morales (Guatemala) Daniela Schippers	6	6
Bye
(Honduras) Daniela Obando (Honduras) Zulema Zelaya
(Cuba) Yenise Machado (Cuba) Yusleydis Smith Dias	6	6
(Costa Rica) Andrea Brenes (Costa Rica) Ariana Rahmanparast	4	2
Bye
2	(Mexico) Victoria Rodríguez (Mexico) Marcela Zacarías

Quarterfinals
1	(Venezuela) Andrea Gámiz (Venezuela) Adriana Pérez	6	6
(Grenada) Lois Alexis (Grenada) Akilah James	1	3
(Dominican Republic) Glenny Cepeda (Dominican Republic) Karla Portalatin	7	4	[6]
(The Bahamas) Kerrie Cartwright (The Bahamas) Larikah Russell	6	6	[10]
(Guatemala) Melissa Morales (Guatemala) Daniela Schippers	6	6
(Honduras) Daniela Obando (Honduras) Zulema Zelaya	1	4
(Cuba) Yenise Machado (Cuba) Yusleydis Smith Dias	3	6
2	(Mexico) Victoria Rodríguez (Mexico) Marcela Zacarías	6	7

Semifinals
1	(Venezuela) Andrea Gámiz (Venezuela) Adriana Pérez	6	6
(The Bahamas) Kerrie Cartwright (The Bahamas) Larikah Russell	2	4
(Guatemala) Melissa Morales (Guatemala) Daniela Schippers	2	4
2	(Mexico) Victoria Rodríguez (Mexico) Marcela Zacarías	6	6

Gold medal match
1	(Venezuela) Andrea Gámiz (Venezuela) Adriana Pérez	4	6	[7]
2	(Mexico) Victoria Rodríguez (Mexico) Marcela Zacarías	6	3	[10]
Bronze medal match
(The Bahamas) Kerrie Cartwright (The Bahamas) Larikah Russell	2	3
(Guatemala) Melissa Morales (Guatemala) Daniela Schippers	6	6

== Mixed ==
=== Seeds ===
1. (Mexico) Marcela Zacarías / (Mexico) Santiago González (champions)
2. (Dominican Republic) Francesca Segarelli / (Dominican Republic) Víctor Estrella Burgos (semifinals)
3. (Venezuela) Adriana Pérez / (Venezuela) David Souto (final)
4. (Puerto Rico) Monica Puig / (Puerto Rico) Alex Llompart (quarterfinals)

=== Key ===
- Q = Qualifier
- WC = Wild card
- LL = Lucky loser
- Alt = Alternate
- SE = Special exempt
- PR = Protected ranking
- ITF = ITF entry
- JE = Junior exempt
- w/o = Walkover
- r = Retired
- d = Defaulted
- SR = Special ranking

=== Draw ===
First round
1	(Mexico) Marcela Zacarías (Mexico) Santiago González
Bye
(Cuba) Yusleydis Smith Dias (Cuba) Omar Hernández	3	6	[10]
(The Bahamas) Larikah Russell (The Bahamas) Marvin Rolle	6	1	[5]
4	(Puerto Rico) Monica Puig (Puerto Rico) Alex Llompart
Bye
(Guatemala) Andrea Weedon (Guatemala) Christopher Díaz Figueroa
Bye
Bye
(Costa Rica) Camila Quesada (Costa Rica) Ignaci Roca
Bye
3	(Venezuela) Adriana Pérez (Venezuela) David Souto
Bye
(El Salvador) Paola Artiga (El Salvador) Marcelo Arévalo
Bye
2	(Dominican Republic) Francesca Segarelli (Dominican Republic) Víctor Estrella Burgos

Quarterfinals
1	(Mexico) Marcela Zacarías (Mexico) Santiago González	6	6
(Cuba) Yusleydis Smith Dias (Cuba) Omar Hernández	1	1
4	(Puerto Rico) Monica Puig (Puerto Rico) Alex Llompart	6	6
(Guatemala) Andrea Weedon (Guatemala) Christopher Díaz Figueroa	7	7
(Costa Rica) Camila Quesada (Costa Rica) Ignaci Roca	0	2
3	(Venezuela) Adriana Pérez (Venezuela) David Souto	6	6
(El Salvador) Paola Artiga (El Salvador) Marcelo Arévalo	3	2
2	(Dominican Republic) Francesca Segarelli (Dominican Republic) Víctor Estrella Burgos	6	6

Semifinals
1	(Mexico) Marcela Zacarías (Mexico) Santiago González	6	6
(Guatemala) Andrea Weedon (Guatemala) Christopher Díaz Figueroa	3	2
3	(Venezuela) Adriana Pérez (Venezuela) David Souto	1	6	[10]
2	(Dominican Republic) Francesca Segarelli (Dominican Republic) Víctor Estrella Burgos	6	4	[6]

Gold medal match
1	(Mexico) Marcela Zacarías (Mexico) Santiago González	7	6
3	(Venezuela) Adriana Pérez (Venezuela) David Souto	5	3
Bronze medal match
(Guatemala) Andrea Weedon (Guatemala) Christopher Díaz Figueroa	7	1	[4]
2	(Dominican Republic) Francesca Segarelli (Dominican Republic) Víctor Estrella Burgos	5	6	[10]

== Medal table ==
* Host nation (Mexico)

Rank	Nation	Gold	Silver	Bronze	Total
1	Mexico (MEX)*	3	2	0	5
2	Colombia (COL)	2	0	1	3
3	Dominican Republic (DOM)	1	1	2	4
4	Puerto Rico (PUR)	1	0	0	1
5	Venezuela (VEN)	0	3	2	5
6	Guatemala (GUA)	0	1	2	3
Totals (6 entries)		7	7	7	21
