= Jesús Bandrés =

Venezuelan tennis player (born 1991)

- Country (sports): Venezuela
- Born: 30 January 1991 (age 35)
- Height: 5 ft 11 in (180 cm)
- Plays: Right-handed
- Prize money: $13,239

Singles
- Career record: 0–3 (Davis Cup)
- Highest ranking: No. 824 (14 Nov 2011)

Doubles
- Highest ranking: No. 642 (22 Jun 2015)
Medal record
Central American and Caribbean Games
Bronze medal – third place	2014 Veracruz	Men's team

Jesús Bandrés (born 30 January 1991) is a Venezuelan former professional tennis player.

== Career ==
Bandrés, known as “Chucho”, was raised in Caracas and ranked amongst the world's top 100 players on the ITF Junior Circuit. One of the highlights of his junior career was winning the doubles title at the Copa del Cafe. He went on to play collegiate tennis in the United States for East Tennessee State University, where in 2012 he was named the Atlantic Sun Tournament MVP. In 2014 he debuted for the Venezuela Davis Cup team in a tie against Uruguay. He played Davis Cup again in 2017 when he was recalled despite being largely absent from the professional tour. At the time he was serving as assistant men's coach of Washington University in St. Louis.

== ITF Futures finals ==
=== Doubles: 5 (1–4) ===
Result	W–L	Date	Tournament	Surface	Partner	Opponents	Score
Loss	0–1	Aug 2013	Venezuela F5, Caracas	Hard	(Venezuela) Luis Fernando Ramírez	(Venezuela) Luis David Martínez (Venezuela) Roberto Maytín	6–2, 6–7^{(5)}, [3–10]
Loss	0–2	Jun 2014	USA F17, Oklahoma City	Hard	(Ecuador) Gonzalo Escobar	(United States) Mackenzie McDonald (United States) Martin Redlicki	6–4, 6–7^{(3)}, [8–10]
Loss	0–3	Jul 2014	Venezuela F1, Caracas	Hard	(Venezuela) Luis Fernando Ramírez	(Venezuela) Luis David Martínez (Argentina) Mateo Nicolas Martinez	6–7^{(6)}, 2–6
Win	1–3	May 2015	USA F14, Vero Beach	Clay	(Venezuela) Luis Fernando Ramírez	(Argentina) Maximiliano Estévez (United Kingdom) Christopher Helliar	7–6^{(3)}, 6–1
Loss	1–4	Jul 2016	USA F24, Godfrey	Hard	(Argentina) Facundo Mena	(United States) Nathan Ponwith (United States) Emil Reinberg	3–6, 4–6
