= 2006 Fed Cup Americas Zone Group I – Pool A =

Group A of the 2006 Fed Cup Americas Zone Group I was one of two pools in the Americas Zone Group I of the 2006 Fed Cup. Four teams competed in a round robin competition, with the top team and the bottom two teams proceeding to their respective sections of the play-offs: the top teams played for advancement to the World Group II Play-offs, while the bottom teams faced potential relegation to Group II.

		(Canada) CAN	(Mexico) MEX	(Uruguay) URU	(Chile) CHI	RR; W–L	Set; W–L	Game; W–L	Standings
17	Canada		3–0	3–0	3–0	3–0	18–0	113–56	1
28	Mexico	0–3		2–1	3–0	2–1	10–11	97–104	2
35	Uruguay	0–3	1–2		1–2	0–3	5–14	74–100	4
43	Chile	0–3	0–3	2–1		1–2	6–14	88–112	3

== Canada vs. Uruguay ==
Canada
3
Club Campestre de Medellín, Medellín, Colombia
19 April 2006
Red clay (outdoors)

Uruguay
0

			1	2	3
1	(Canada) (Uruguay)	Stéphanie Dubois; María Eugenia Roca Recarey	6; 3	6; 1
2	(Canada) (Uruguay)	Aleksandra Wozniak; Estefanía Craciun	6; 3	7; 5
3	(Canada) (Uruguay)	Sharon Fichman / Marie-Ève Pelletier; Estefanía Craciun / María Eugenia Roca Recarey	6; 3	6; 1

== Mexico vs. Chile ==
Mexico
3
Club Campestre de Medellín, Medellín, Colombia
19 April 2006
Red clay (outdoors)

Chile
0

			1	2	3
1	(Mexico) (Chile)	Melissa Torres Sandoval; Valentina Castro	7^{7} 6^{5}	5; 7	6; 4
2	(Mexico) (Chile)	Daniela Múñoz Gallegos; Andrea Koch-Benvenuto	6; 1	7^{7} 6^{3}
3	(Mexico) (Chile)	Erika Clarke / Daniela Múñoz Gallegos; Andrea Koch-Benvenuto / Soledad Podlipnik	3; 6	6; 3	6; 3

== Canada vs. Chile ==
Canada
3
Club Campestre de Medellín, Medellín, Colombia
20 April 2006
Red clay (outdoors)

Chile
0

			1	2	3
1	(Canada) (Chile)	Stéphanie Dubois; Valentina Castro	7; 5	6; 4
2	(Canada) (Chile)	Aleksandra Wozniak; Andrea Koch-Benvenuto	6; 1	6; 2
3	(Canada) (Chile)	Stéphanie Dubois / Sharon Fichman; Valentina Castro / Andrea Koch-Benvenuto	6; 4	7; 5

== Mexico vs. Uruguay ==
Mexico
2
Club Campestre de Medellín, Medellín, Colombia
20 April 2006
Red clay (outdoors)

Uruguay
1

			1	2	3
1	(Mexico) (Uruguay)	Melissa Torres Sandoval; María Eugenia Roca Recarey	3; 6	6; 1	6; 2
2	(Mexico) (Uruguay)	Daniela Múñoz Gallegos; Estefanía Craciun	3; 6	1; 6
3	(Mexico) (Uruguay)	Erika Clarke / Melissa Torres Sandoval; Estefanía Craciun / Ana Lucía Migliarini de León	6; 3	7^{7} 6^{5}

== Canada vs. Mexico ==
Canada
3
{{{venue}}}
21 April 2006
Red clay (outdoors)

Mexico
0

			1	2	3
1	(Canada) (Mexico)	Stéphanie Dubois; Melissa Torres Sandoval	6; 4	7; 5
2	(Canada) (Mexico)	Aleksandra Wozniak; Daniela Múñoz Gallegos	6; 0	7; 5
3	(Canada) (Mexico)	Sharon Fichman / Marie-Ève Pelletier; Erika Clarke / Lorena Villalobos Cruz	6; 1	6; 4

== Uruguay vs. Chile ==
Uruguay
1
Club Campestre de Medellín, Medellín, Colombia
21 April 2006
Red clay (outdoors)

Chile
2

			1	2	3
1	(Uruguay) (Chile)	María Eugenia Roca Recarey; María Eugenia Roca Recarey	3; 6	4; 6
2	(Uruguay) (Chile)	Estefanía Craciun; Andrea Koch-Benvenuto	3; 6	6^{4} 7^{7}
3	(Uruguay) (Chile)	Ana Lucía Migliarini de León / María Eugenia Roca Recarey; Andrea Koch-Benvenuto / Soledad Podlipnik	6; 3	6; 3

== See also ==
- Fed Cup structure
