= 2006 Fed Cup Americas Zone Group II – Pool A =

Group A of the 2006 Fed Cup Americas Zone Group II was one of two pools in the Americas Zone Group II of the 2006 Fed Cup. Three teams competed in a round robin competition, with the top team and the bottom two teams proceeding to their respective sections of the play-offs: the top teams played for advancement to the 2007 Group I.

		(Bolivia) BOL	(Venezuela) VEN	(Panama) PAN	RR; W–L	Set; W–L	Game; W–L	Standings
50	Bolivia		0–3	3–0	1–1	6–6	43–39	2
67	Venezuela	3–0		3–0	2–0	12–0	72–10	1
86	Panama	0–3	0–3		0–2	0–12	6–72	3

== Bolivia vs. Panama ==
Bolivia
3
Parque del Este, Santo Domingo, Dominican Republic
17 April 2006
Hard (outdoors)

Panama
0

			1	2	3
1	(Bolivia) (Panama)	Marcela Rivero; Johanna de León	6; 0	6; 0
2	(Bolivia) (Panama)	Daniela Trigo; Nicole Arosemena	6; 1	6; 0
3	(Bolivia) (Panama)	Patricia Cortés / Diana Kyllmann; Nicole Arosemena / Análisa Miró	6; 0	6; 2

== Venezuela vs. Panama ==
Venezuela
3
Parque del Este, Santo Domingo, Dominican Republic
18 April 2006
Hard (outdoors)

Panama
0

			1	2	3
1	(Venezuela) (Panama)	Milagros Sequera; Johanna de León	6; 1	6; 0
2	(Venezuela) (Panama)	María Vento-Kabchi; Nicole Arosemena	6; 1	6; 0
3	(Venezuela) (Panama)	Marina Giral Lores / Mariana Muci; Nicole Arosemena / Johanna de León	6; 1	6; 0

== Bolivia vs. Venezuela ==
Bolivia
0
Parque del Este, Santo Domingo, Dominican Republic
19 April 2006
Hard (outdoors)

Venezuela
3

			1	2	3
1	(Bolivia) (Venezuela)	Marcela Rivero; Milagros Sequera	1; 6	1; 6
2	(Bolivia) (Venezuela)	Daniela Trigo; María Vento-Kabchi	1; 6	0; 6
3	(Bolivia) (Venezuela)	Diana Kyllmann / Daniela Trigo; Marina Giral Lores / Mariana Muci	0; 6	4; 6

== See also ==
- Fed Cup structure
