= Nina Munch-Søgaard =

Norwegian tennis player

- Country (sports): Norway
- Born: 26 November 1987 (age 37)
- Turned pro: 2004
- Retired: 2011
- Plays: Left (two-handed backhand)
- Prize money: $9,745

Singles
- Career record: 32–40
- Highest ranking: No. 539 (8 May 2006)

Doubles
- Career record: 34–15
- Career titles: 4 ITF
- Highest ranking: No. 531 (1 October 2007)

Nina Munch-Søgaard (born 26 November 1987) is a Norwegian former professional tennis player.

She won four doubles titles on the ITF Women's Circuit in her career. On 8 May 2006, she reached her best singles ranking of world No. 539. On 1 October 2007, she peaked at No. 531 in the doubles rankings.

Playing for Norway in Fed Cup competition, Munch-Søgaard has a win/loss record of 4–0.

She retired from the tour 2011.

== ITF finals ==
=== Doubles (4–3) ===
$25,000 tournaments
$10,000 tournaments

Result	No.	Date	Tournament	Surface	Partner	Opponents	Score
Loss	1.	8 July 2006	ITF Southlake, United States	Hard	(United States) Ashley Weinhold	(Slovakia) Dominika Diešková (United States) Courtney Nagle	6–2, 6–7^{(4)}, 3–6
Win	1.	26 May 2007	ITF El Paso, United States	Hard	(Bosnia and Herzegovina) Helena Bešović	(United States) Ashlee Brown (United States) Sabrina Capannolo	5–7, 6–3, 7–6^{(1)}
Win	2.	2 June 2007	ITF Houston, United States	Hard	(Bosnia and Herzegovina) Helena Bešović	(United States) Kimberly Couts (United States) Christina McHale	7–6^{(2)}, 7–5
Loss	2.	29 July 2007	ITF Evansville, United States	Hard	(Bosnia and Herzegovina) Helena Bešović	(United States) Jenna Long (United States) Anna Lubinsky	1–6, 6–3, 2–6
Loss	3.	7 August 2010	ITF Savitaipale, Finland	Clay	(Finland) Katariina Tuohimaa	(Russia) Alexandra Artamonova (Latvia) Diāna Marcinkēviča	2–6, 3–6
Win	3.	8 January 2011	ITF Saint-Martin, France (Guadeloupe)	Hard	(United States) Elizabeth Lumpkin	(France) Céline Cattaneo (Switzerland) Lara Michel	3–6, 6–4, [10–3]
Win	4.	15 January 2011	ITF Le Gosier, France (Guadeloupe)	Hard	(United States) Amanda McDowell	(France) Amandine Cazeaux (France) Irina Ramialison	6–0, 7–5

== Fed Cup participation ==
=== Singles ===
Edition	Date	Location	Against	Surface	Opponent	W/L	Score
2006 Fed Cup; Europe/Africa Zone III	26 April 2006	Antalya, Turkey	(Moldova) Moldova	Clay	(Moldova) Olga Ćosić	W	6–0, 6–1
2006 Fed Cup; Europe/Africa Zone III	26 April 2006	Antalya, Turkey	Tunisia	Clay	(Tunisia) Olfa Dhaoui	W	6–4, 6–4
2006 Fed Cup; Europe/Africa Zone III	29 April 2006	Antalya, Turkey	Turkey	Clay	(Turkey) İpek Şenoğlu	W	6–2, 6–2

=== Doubles ===
Edition	Date	Location	Against	Surface	Partner	Opponents	W/L	Score
2006 Fed Cup; Europe/Africa Zone III	26 April 2006	Antalya, Turkey	(Tunisia) Tunisia	Clay	(Norway) Karoline Borgersen	(Tunisia) Olfa Dhaoui (Tunisia) Selima Sfar	W	6–1, 6–1
