= 2006 Fed Cup Europe/Africa Zone Group II – Pool A =

Group A of the 2006 Fed Cup Europe/Africa Zone Group II was one of four pools in the Europe/Africa Zone Group II of the 2006 Fed Cup. Three teams competed in a round robin competition, with the top team and the bottom two teams proceeding to their respective sections of the play-offs: the top teams played for advancement to Group I, while the bottom team faced potential relegation to Group III.

		(Georgia (country)) GEO	(Republic of Ireland) IRL	(Lithuania) LTU	RR; W–L	Set; W–L	Game; W–L	Standings
52	Georgia		2–1	1–2	1–1	7–6	65–60	2
57	Ireland	1–2		1–2	0–2	4–9	34–70	3
60	Lithuania	2–1	2–1		2–0	9–5	78–47	1

== Georgia vs. Lithuania ==
Georgia
1
Club Ali Bey, Manavgat, Antalya, Turkey
26 April 2006
Red clay (outdoors)

Lithuania
2

			1	2	3
1	(Georgia (country)) (Lithuania)	Ia Jikia; Aurelija Misevičiūtė	2; 6	7^{9} 6^{7}	3; 6
2	(Georgia (country)) (Lithuania)	Margalita Chakhnashvili; Lina Stančiūtė	7; 5	7^{7} 6^{3}
3	(Georgia (country)) (Lithuania)	Margalita Chakhnashvili / Ia Jikia; Aurelija Misevičiūtė / Lina Stančiūtė	3; 6	3; 6

== Ireland vs. Lithuania ==
Ireland
1
Club Ali Bey, Manavgat, Antalya, Turkey
27 April 2006
Red clay (outdoors)

Lithuania
2

			1	2	3
1	(Republic of Ireland) (Lithuania)	Yvonne Doyle; Aurelija Misevičiūtė	1; 6	6; 3	6; 4
2	(Republic of Ireland) (Lithuania)	Rachael Dillon; Lina Stančiūtė	0; 6	1; 6
3	(Republic of Ireland) (Lithuania)	Rachael Dillon / Yvonne Doyle; Aurelija Misevičiūtė / Lina Stančiūtė	0; 6	1; 6

== Georgia vs. Ireland ==
Georgia
2
Club Ali Bey, Manavgat, Antalya, Turkey
28 April 2006
Red clay (outdoors)

Ireland
1

			1	2	3
1	(Georgia (country)) (Republic of Ireland)	Ia Jikia; Yvonne Doyle	6; 2	6; 2
2	(Georgia (country)) (Republic of Ireland)	Margalita Chakhnashvili; Rachael Dillon	6; 1	6; 1
3	(Georgia (country)) (Republic of Ireland)	Margalita Chakhnashvili / Ia Jikia; Rachael Dillon / Yvonne Doyle	3; 6	6^{3} 7^{7}

== See also ==
- Fed Cup structure
