= 2006 Fed Cup Americas Zone Group I – Pool B =

International tennis competition

Group B of the 2006 Fed Cup Americas Zone Group I was one of two pools in the Americas Zone Group I of the 2006 Fed Cup. Four teams competed in a round robin competition, with the top team and the bottom two teams proceeding to their respective sections of the play-offs: the top teams played for advancement to the World Group II Play-offs, while the bottom teams faced potential relegation to Group II.

		(Brazil) BRA	(Puerto Rico) PUR	(Cuba) CUB	(Colombia) COL	RR; W–L	Set; W–L	Game; W–L	Standings
21	Brazil		2–1	3–0	3–0	3–0	16–5	109–73	1
25	Puerto Rico	1–2		2–1	2–1	2–1	13–9	109–84	2
35	Cuba	0–3	1–2		0–3	0–3	5–16	73–113	4
43	Colombia	0–3	1–2	3–0		1–2	8–12	76–97	3

== Brazil vs. Colombia ==
Brazil
3
Club Campestre de Medellín, Medellín, Colombia
19 April 2006
Red clay (outdoors)

Colombia
0

			1	2	3
1	(Brazil) (Colombia)	Jenifer Widjaja; Viky Núñez Fuentes	6; 1	7^{7} 6^{3}
2	(Brazil) (Colombia)	Maria Fernanda Alves; Karen Castiblanco	6; 2	6; 1
3	(Brazil) (Colombia)	Larissa Carvalho / Letícia Sobral; Karen Castiblanco / Mariana Duque Mariño	6; 1	6; 1

== Puerto Rico vs. Cuba ==
Puerto Rico
2
Club Campestre de Medellín, Medellín, Colombia
19 April 2006
Red clay (outdoors)

Cuba
1

			1	2	3
1	(Puerto Rico) (Cuba)	Jessica Roland-Rosario; Yanet Núñez Mojarena	3; 6	4; 6
2	(Puerto Rico) (Cuba)	Kristina Brandi; Yamile Fors Guerra	6; 1	6; 3
3	(Puerto Rico) (Cuba)	Kristina Brandi / Vilmarie Castellvi; Yamile Fors Guerra / Yanet Núñez Mojarena	2; 6	6; 2	6; 4

== Brazil vs. Cuba ==
Brazil
3
Club Campestre de Medellín, Medellín, Colombia
20 April 2006
Red clay (outdoors)

Cuba
0

			1	2	3
1	(Brazil) (Cuba)	Jenifer Widjaja; Yanet Núñez Mojarena	6; 0	6; 4
2	(Brazil) (Cuba)	Maria Fernanda Alves; Yamile Fors Guerra	6; 0	7; 5
3	(Brazil) (Cuba)	Larissa Carvalho / Letícia Sobral; Yamile Fors Guerra / Yanet Núñez Mojarena	7^{7} 6^{5}	2; 6	6; 0

== Puerto Rico vs. Colombia ==
Puerto Rico
2
Club Campestre de Medellín, Medellín, Colombia
20 April 2006
Red clay (outdoors)

Colombia
1

			1	2	3
1	(Puerto Rico) (Colombia)	Vilmarie Castellvi; Paula Catalina Robles García	6; 1	6; 1
2	(Puerto Rico) (Colombia)	Kristina Brandi; Mariana Duque Mariño	6; 3	6; 1
3	(Puerto Rico) (Colombia)	Natalia Guevara / Jessica Roland-Rosario; Karen Castiblanco / Viky Núñez Fuentes	1; 6	7^{7} 6^{4}	4; 6

== Brazil vs. Puerto Rico ==
Brazil
2
Club Campestre de Medellín, Medellín, Colombia
21 April 2006
Red clay (outdoors)

Puerto Rico
1

			1	2	3
1	(Brazil) (Puerto Rico)	Jenifer Widjaja; Vilmarie Castellvi	2; 6	6; 4	7; 5
2	(Brazil) (Puerto Rico)	Maria Fernanda Alves; Kristina Brandi	2; 6	1; 6
3	(Brazil) (Puerto Rico)	Larissa Carvalho / Letícia Sobral; Kristina Brandi / Vilmarie Castellvi	2; 6	6; 3	6; 4

== Cuba vs. Colombia ==
Cuba
0
Club Campestre de Medellín, Medellín, Colombia
21 April 2006
Red clay (outdoors)

Colombia
3

			1	2	3
1	(Cuba) (Colombia)	Yanet Núñez Mojarena; Viky Núñez Fuentes	5; 7	0; 6
2	(Cuba) (Colombia)	Yamile Fors Guerra; Mariana Duque Mariño	1; 6	4; 6
3	(Cuba) (Colombia)	Yamile Fors Guerra / Yanet Núñez Mojarena; Karen Castiblanco / Viky Núñez Fuentes	6; 3	4; 6	4; 6

== See also ==
- Fed Cup structure
