= Ana Sofía Sánchez =

Mexican tennis player (born 1994

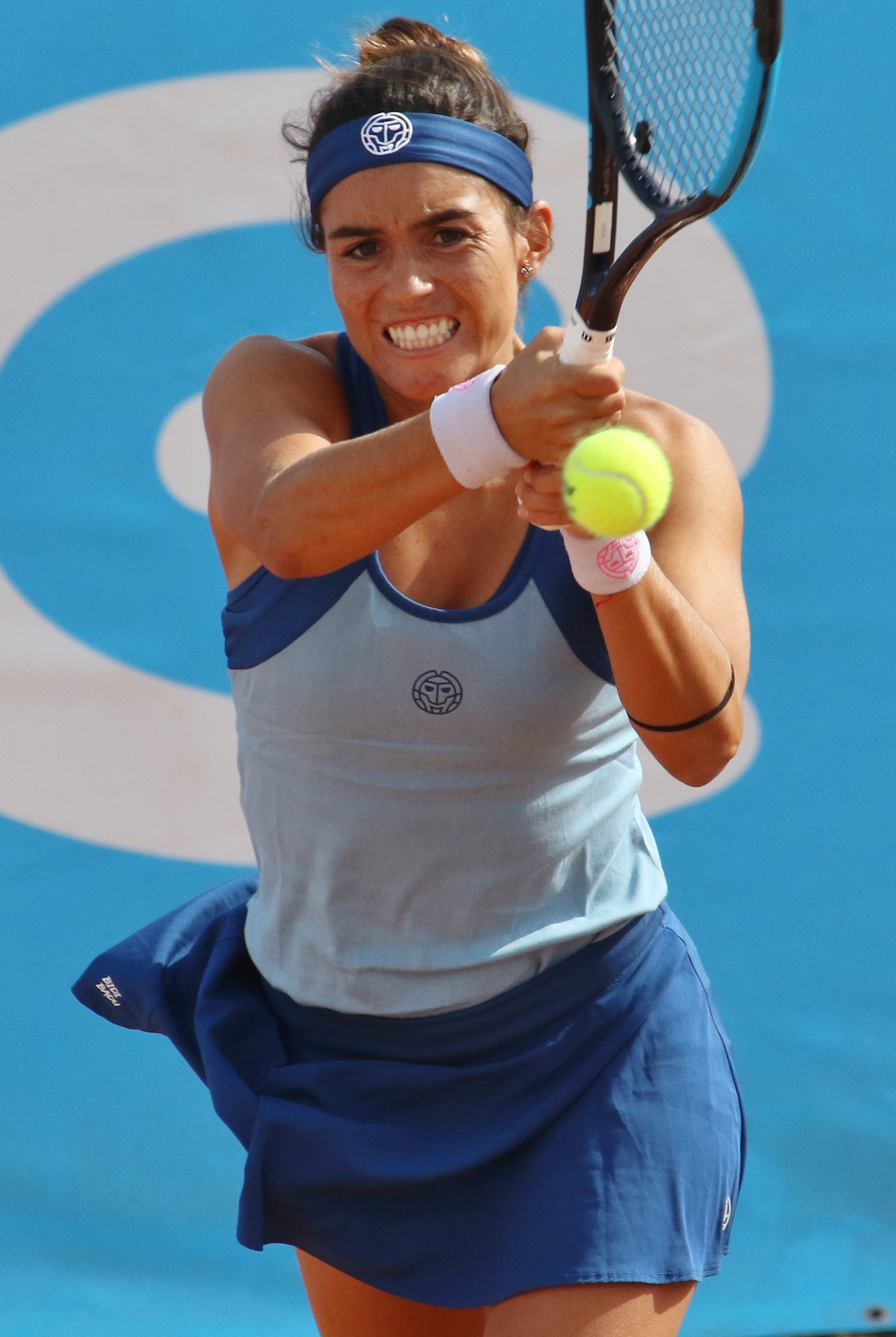
- Full name: Ana Sofía Sánchez Palau
- Country (sports): Mexico
- Born: 13 April 1994 (age 32) San Luis Potosí
- Height: 1.62 m (5 ft 4 in)
- Plays: Left (two-handed backhand)
- Prize money: $512,454

Singles
- Career record: 504–403
- Career titles: 16 ITF
- Highest ranking: No. 173 (3 November 2025)
- Current ranking: No. 366 (10 August 2025)

Grand Slam singles results
- Australian Open: Q1 (2022, 2026)
- French Open: Q1 (2026)
- US Open: Q1 (2025)

Doubles
- Career record: 274–298
- Career titles: 12 ITF
- Highest ranking: No. 221 (15 August 2016)
- Current ranking: No. 431 (10 August 2026)

Team competitions
- Fed Cup: 15–10
Medal record
Representing Mexico
Women's tennis
Central American and Caribbean Games
Gold medal – first place	2014 Veracruz	Team event
Silver medal – second place	2014 Veracruz	Singles
- Last updated on: 22 August 2026.

Ana Sofía Sánchez Palau (Latin American Spanish: [ana soˈfi.a ˈsantʃes]; born 13 April 1994) is a Mexican professional tennis player.

On 3 November 2025, she reached her best singles ranking of world No. 173. On 15 August 2016, she peaked at No. 221 in the WTA doubles rankings. Sánchez has won 16 singles and 12 doubles titles on the ITF Women's Circuit. Her biggest title to date is the triumph at the W75 tournament in Olomouc, Czech Republic, in July 2025.

In 2012, Sánchez made her debut for the Mexico Fed Cup team.

== Career ==
Sánchez began playing tennis at the age of 10, quickly developing a passion for the sport. She plays left-handed.

In August 2016, in doubles, she reached the semifinal in Florianopolis, Brazil with partner Montserrat González. The pair lost to third-seeded Tímea Babos and Réka Luca Jani, in straight sets.

She reached the second round at the 2018 Monterrey Open, her best result thus far, defeating Usue Maitane Arconada in the first round, before losing to Sachia Vickery. She became the first Mexican player ever to win at Monterrey, having lost her previous six WTA Tour-level main-draw matches.

In 2023, she qualified into the main draw of her home tournament, the WTA 1000 Guadalajara Open, where she lost in round one to Dayana Yastremska. She also received wildcards in singles and doubles for the next edition of the tournament, which was downgraded to a WTA 500 in 2024, but also lost in the first rounds.

In 2026, Sánchez won the WTT W15 in Brazil, beating Ana Candiotto in the Final, earning a total prize of $2,352.

== Grand Slam singles performance timeline ==
Key
W	F	SF	QF	#R	RR	Q#	DNQ	A	NH

(W) winner; (F) finalist; (SF) semifinalist; (QF) quarterfinalist; (#R) rounds 4, 3, 2, 1; (RR) round-robin stage; (Q#) qualification round; (DNQ) did not qualify; (A) absent; (NH) not held; (SR) strike rate (events won / competed); (W–L) win–loss record.
To avoid confusion and double counting, these charts are updated at the conclusion of a tournament or when the player's participation has ended.

== ITF Circuit finals ==
=== Singles: 41 (18 titles, 23 runner-ups) ===
Legend W75 tournaments (1–0) W50 tournaments (0–2) W25/35 tournaments (3–9) W10/15 tournaments (14–12)	Finals by surface Hard (11–14) Clay (7–9)

Result	W–L	Date	Tournament	Tier	Surface	Opponent	Score
Win	1–0	Jun 2011	ITF Zacatecas, Mexico	W10	Hard	(Puerto Rico) Jessica Roland	6–2, 1–6, 6–3
Win	2–0	Apr 2012	ITF Chosica, Peru	W10	Clay	(Ukraine) Anastasia Kharchenko	7–5, 6–1
Win	3–0	May 2012	ITF Rosario, Argentina	W10	Clay	(Argentina) Guadalupe Moreno	6–1, 6–3
Loss	3–1	Jun 2013	ITF Quintana Roo, Mexico	W10	Hard	(Paraguay) Montserrat González	6–4, 6–7^{(4)}, 6–7^{(1)}
Win	4–1	Jun 2013	ITF Quintana Roo, Mexico	W10	Hard	(Paraguay) Montserrat González	6–3, 6–2
Win	5–1	Jun 2013	ITF Quintana Roo, Mexico	W10	Hard	(Mexico) Marcela Zacarías	6–1, 6–3
Loss	5–2	Aug 2013	ITF San Luis Potosí, Mexico	W15	Hard	(Croatia) Jelena Pandžić	4–6, 4–6
Loss	5–3	Oct 2013	ITF Victoria, Mexico	W15	Hard	(Mexico) Victoria Rodríguez	2–6, 6–4, 0–4 ret.
Win	6–3	Nov 2013	ITF Lima, Peru	W10	Clay	(Dominican Republic) Francesca Segarelli	6–3, 5–7, 6–4
Win	7–3	May 2014	ITF Sousse, Tunisia	W10	Hard	(Spain) Nuria Párrizas Díaz	6–1, 6–2
Win	8–3	May 2014	ITF Sousse, Tunisia	W10	Hard	(North Macedonia) Lina Gjorcheska	6–3, 6–1
Loss	8–4	Jun 2014	ITF Quintana Roo, Mexico	W10	Hard	(Mexico) Victoria Rodríguez	6–4, 2–6, 4–6
Win	9–4	Jun 2014	ITF Quintana Roo, Mexico	W10	Hard	(United States) Allie Will	3–6, 6–0, 6–0
Win	10–4	Jun 2014	ITF Quintana Roo, Mexico	W10	Hard	(Mexico) Marcela Zacarías	4–6, 6–4, 6–0
Loss	10–5	Aug 2015	ITF Buenos Aires, Argentina	W10	Clay	(Chile) Daniela Seguel	2–6, 2–6
Loss	10–6	Apr 2016	ITF León, Mexico	W10	Hard	(Mexico) Renata Zarazua	6–2, 3–6, 3–6
Loss	10–7	Jul 2017	ITF Amstelveen, Netherlands	W15	Clay	(Germany) Lisa Matviyenko	6–7^{(5)}, 2–6
Win	11–7	Jul 2017	ITF Brussels, Belgium	W15	Clay	(Sweden) Mirjam Björklund	3–6, 6–4, 6–1
Win	12–7	Sep 2017	ITF Schoonhoven, Netherlands	W15	Clay	(Russia) Marina Melnikova	6–3, 6–4
Loss	12–8	Dec 2017	ITF Santa Cruz, Bolivia	W15	Clay	(Chile) Fernanda Brito	4–6, 3–6
Loss	12–9	Feb 2018	ITF Surprise, United States	W25	Hard	(Belgium) Yanina Wickmayer	6–3, 3–6, 4–6
Loss	12–10	Jan 2019	ITF Petit-Bourg, Guadeloupe	W25	Hard	(Poland) Urszula Radwańska	1–6, 6–2, 1–6
Loss	12–11	Apr 2019	ITF Cancún, Mexico	W15	Hard	(Mexico) Marcela Zacarías	0–6, 5–7
Win	13–11	Jun 2021	ITF Santo Domingo, Dominican Republic	W25	Hard	(United States) Emina Bektas	3–6, 7–6^{(3)}, 7–6^{(9)}
Loss	13–12	May 2022	ITF Naples, United States	W25	Clay	(United States) Kayla Day	1–6, 1–6
Win	14–12	Nov 2023	ITF Santo Domingo, Dom. Rep.	W25	Hard	(Serbia) Dejana Radanović	1–6, 7–6^{(0)}, 6–2
Loss	14–13	Nov 2023	ITF Santo Domingo, Dom. Rep.	W25	Hard	(United States) Maria Mateas	5–7, 6–7^{(2)}
Loss	14–14	Mar 2025	ITF Santo Domingo, Dom. Rep.	W50	Hard	(United States) Whitney Osuigwe	2–6, 5–7
Loss	14–15	Mar 2025	ITF Santo Domingo, Dom. Rep.	W50	Hard	(Canada) Carson Branstine	1–6, 3–6
Loss	14–16	Mar 2025	ITF Jackson, United States	W35	Clay	(United States) Monika Ekstrand	3–6, 4–6
Loss	14–17	May 2025	ITF Bethany Beach, United States	W35	Clay	(United States) Ayana Akli	2–6, 5–7
Loss	14–18	May 2025	ITF Santo Domingo, Dom. Rep.	W35	Clay	(Czech Republic) Darja Viďmanová	1–6, 1–6
Win	15-18	Jun 2025	ITF Santo Domingo, Dom. Rep.	W35	Hard	(United States) Rachel Gailis	7–6^{(3)}, 6–3
Win	16-18	Jul 2025	ITS Cup Olomouc, Czech Republic	W75	Clay	(Romania) Gabriela Lee	7–5, 5–7, 6–3
Loss	16–19	Aug 2025	ITF Southaven, United States	W35	Hard	(United States) Kayla Day	4–6, 1–6
Loss	16–20	Aug 2026	ITF Chacabuco, Argentina	W35	Clay	(Italy) Giorgia Pedone	4–6, 6–3, 0–6
Win	17–20	Aug 2026	ITF Porto Velho, Brazil	W15	Hard	(Brazil) Ana Candiotto	6–3, 6–3
Loss	17–21	Sep 2026	ITF Trelew, Argentina	W15	Hard	(Paraguay) Leyla Brítez Risso	4–6, 4–6
Loss	17–22	Oct 2026	ITF Cipolletti, Argentina	W15	Hard	(Paraguay) Leyla Brítez Risso	1–6, 0–6
Loss	17–23	Oct 2026	ITF Maceió, Brazil	W15	Clay (i)	(Chile) Bárbara Gatica	5–7, 0–6
Win	18–23	Oct 2026	ITF Campina Grande, Brazil	W15	Clay	(Argentina) Justina María González Daniele	4–6, 6–4, 6–1

=== Doubles: 37 (14 titles, 23 runner-ups) ===
Legend W100 tournaments (0–1) W40/50 tournaments (0–2) W25/35 tournaments (6–7) W10/15 tournaments (8–13)	Finals by surface Hard (4–12) Clay (10–11)

Result	W–L	Date	Tournament	Tier	Surface	Partner	Opponents	Score
Win	1–0	Aug 2012	ITF Trujillo, Peru	10k	Clay	(Argentina) Aranza Salut	(Peru) Patricia Kú Flores (Peru) Katherine Miranda Chang	3–6, 6–1, [11–9]
Loss	1–1	Aug 2012	ITF Lima, Peru	10k	Clay	(Argentina) Aranza Salut	(Brazil) Eduarda Piai (Brazil) Karina Venditti	4–6, 6–3, [8–10]
Loss	1–2	Sep 2012	ITF Buenos Aires, Argentina	10k	Clay	(Argentina) Aranza Salut	(Argentina) Andrea Benítez (Chile) Camila Silva	3–6, 0–6
Win	2–2	May 2013	ITF Villa María, Argentina	10k	Clay	(Chile) Camila Silva	(Argentina) Victoria Bosio (Argentina) Aranza Salut	6–1, 6–2
Loss	2–3	Jun 2013	ITF Quintana Roo, Mexico	10k	Hard	(Guatemala) Daniela Schippers	(United States) Danielle Mills (Dominican Republic) Francesca Segarelli	2–6, 4–6
Loss	2–4	Jun 2013	ITF Quintana Roo, Mexico	10k	Hard	(Guatemala) Daniela Schippers	(Japan) Akari Inoue (Australia) Julia Moriarty	7–5, 6–7^{(4)}, [10–12]
Loss	2–5	Aug 2013	ITF San Luis Potosí, Mexico	15k	Hard	(Mexico) Marcela Zacarías	(Mexico) Carolina Betancourt (Mexico) Camila Fuentes	2–6, 3–6
Loss	2–6	Oct 2013	ITF Victoria, Mexico	15k	Hard	(United States) Hsu Chieh-yu	(Bolivia) María Fernanda Álvarez (Argentina) María Irigoyen	6–7^{(2)}, 3–6
Win	3–6	Nov 2013	ITF Lima, Peru	10k	Clay	(Dominican Republic) Francesca Segarelli	(Argentina) Daniela Farfan (Colombia) María Herazo González	0–6, 6–4, [10–8]
Loss	3–7	May 2014	ITF Sousse, Tunisia	10k	Hard	(Slovakia) Chantal Škamlová	(Australia) Alexandra Nancarrow (Spain) Olga Parres Azcoitia	4–6, 2–6
Loss	3–8	Mar 2015	ITF Irapuato, Mexico	25k	Hard	(Japan) Ayaka Okuno	(Mexico) Marcela Zacarías (Mexico) Victoria Rodríguez	1–6, 5–7
Loss	3–9	May 2015	ITF Obregón, Mexico	15k	Hard	(Dominican Republic) Francesca Segarelli	(Mexico) Marcela Zacarías (Mexico) Victoria Rodríguez	3–6, 1–6
Win	4–9	Aug 2015	ITF San Luis Potosí, Mexico	15k	Hard	(Paraguay) Montserrat González	(Brazil) Maria Fernanda Alves (Brazil) Laura Pigossi	6–4, 3–6, [10–8]
Win	5–9	Nov 2015	ITF Santiago, Chile	10k	Clay	(Paraguay) Montserrat González	(Argentina) Catalina Pella (Chile) Daniela Seguel	6–4, 7–6^{(3)}
Win	6–9	Nov 2016	ITF Santiago, Chile	10k	Clay	(Mexico) Victoria Rodríguez	(Chile) Fernanda Brito (Paraguay) Camila Giangreco Campiz	7–5, 7–5
Loss	6–10	Jun 2017	ITF Sassuolo, Italy	15k	Clay	(Argentina) Carla Lucero	(Italy) Federica Arcidiacono (Italy) Martina Spigarelli	w/o
Loss	6–11	Aug 2017	ITF Vienna, Austria	15k	Clay	(Italy) Lucrezia Stefanini	(Italy) Anastasia Grymalska (Italy) Dalila Spiteri	6–0, 3–6, [8–10]
Loss	6–12	Aug 2017	ITF Oldenzaal, Netherlands	15k	Clay	(Argentina) Paula Ormaechea	(Belgium) Deborah Kerfs (United States) Chiara Scholl	5–7, 3–6
Loss	6–13	Dec 2017	ITF Santiago, Chile	25k	Clay	(Brazil) Carolina Alves	(Belgium) Tamaryn Hendler (Russia) Anastasia Pivovarova	5–7, 2–6
Loss	6–14	Dec 2017	ITF Luque, Paraguay	15k	Hard	(Paraguay) Montserrat Gonzalez	(Brazil) Thaisa Grana Pedretti (Bolivia) Noelia Zeballos	2–6, 4–6
Win	7–14	May 2018	ITF La Bisbal d'Empordà, Spain	25k+H	Clay	(United States) Jamie Loeb	(Spain) Yvonne Cavallé Reimers (United States) Chiara Scholl	6–3, 6–2
Win	8–14	Jul 2019	ITF Vitoria-Gasteiz, Spain	W25	Hard	(Mexico) Victoria Rodríguez	(Spain) Alba Carrillo Marín (United States) Ángela Fita Boluda	6–3, 6–3
Win	9–14	Aug 2019	ITF Las Palmas, Spain	W25+H	Hard	(Mexico) Victoria Rodríguez	(Spain) Marina Bassols Ribera (China) Feng Shuo	6–3, 7–5
Loss	9–15	Sep 2020	Zagreb Ladies Open, Croatia	W25	Clay	(Greece) Valentini Grammatikopoulou	(Croatia) Silvia Njirić (Serbia) Dejana Radanović	6–4, 5–7, [8–10]
Win	10–15	Oct 2020	ITF Porto, Portugal	W25	Hard	(United States) Jamie Loeb	(Croatia) Jana Fett (New Zealand) Erin Routliffe	2–6, 6–3, [10–8]
Loss	10–16	May 2021	ITF Salinas, Ecuador	W25	Hard	(Mexico) Victoria Rodríguez	(United States) Rasheeda McAdoo (Switzerland) Conny Perrin	4–6, 6–7^{(5)}
Loss	10–17	May 2022	ITF Naples, United States	W25	Clay	(United States) Rasheeda McAdoo	(United States) Anna Rogers (United States) Christina Rosca	1–6, 4–6
Loss	10–18	Jun 2023	ITF Santo Domingo, Dom. Rep.	W25	Clay	(Ukraine) Yulia Starodubtseva	(Colombia) María Herazo González (Russia) Ksenia Laskutova	6–2, 4–6, [9–11]
Win	11–18	Jan 2024	ITF Buenos Aires, Argentina	W35	Clay	(United States) Jamie Loeb	(Peru) Romina Ccuno (Russia) Daria Lodikova	7–5, 7–6^{(2)}
Loss	11–19	Nov 2024	ITF Chihuahua City, Mexico	W50	Hard	(Czech Republic) Laura Samson	(United States) Haley Giavara (United States) Dalayna Hewitt	1–6, 3–6
Win	12–19	Jan 2025	ITF Buenos Aires, Argentina	W35	Clay	(Mexico) Victoria Rodríguez	(Czech Republic) Michaela Bayerlova (Romania) Briana Szabó	5–7, 6–2, [10–8]
Loss	12–20	Nov 2025	Guanajuato Open, Mexico	W100	Hard	(Mexico) Victoria Rodríguez	(United States) Victoria Hu (United States) Dalayna Hewitt	4–6, 4–6
Loss	12-21	Mar 2026	ITF Chihuahua City, Mexico	W50	Clay	(Mexico) Victoria Rodríguez	(Venezuela) Sofía Elena Cabezas (Argentina) Jazmin Ortenzi	5–7, 0–6
Loss	12–22	Jul 2026	ITF São Paulo, Brazil	W35	Clay	(Italy) Giorgia Pedone	Daria Egorova (Mexico) Marian Gómez Pezuela	2–6, 4–6
Win	13–22	Aug 2026	ITF Porto Velho, Brazil	W15	Hard	(Colombia) Valentina Mediorreal Arias	(Brazil) Letícia Garcia Vidal (Brazil) Catarina Melleiro	6–3, 6–4
Loss	13–23	Oct 2026	ITF Cipolletti, Argentina	W15	Hard	(Argentina) María Florencia Urrutia	(Argentina) Sol Ailin Larraya Guidi (Argentina) Sofía Meabe	Walkover
Win	14–23	Oct 2026	ITF Campina Grande, Brazil	W15	Clay	(Colombia) Valentina Mediorreal Arias	(Brazil) Letícia Garcia Vidal (Brazil) Júlia Konishi Camargo Silva	6–2, 6–3

== Fed Cup/Billie Jean King Cup participation ==
=== Singles ===
Edition	Round	Date	Location	Against	Surface	Opponent	W/L	Score
2012	Z1 RR	Apr 2012	Guadalajara (MEX)	Costa Rica	Clay	Ximena Mino	W	6–2, 7–5
2012	Z1 RR	Apr 2012	Guadalajara (MEX)	Chile	Clay	Andrea Koch Benvenuto	L	3–6, 1–6
2012	Z1 RR	Apr 2012	Guadalajara (MEX)	Puerto Rico	Clay	Monica Puig	L	3–6, 5–7
2012	Z1 RR	Apr 2012	Guadalajara (MEX)	Uruguay	Clay	María José Pintos	W	6–0, 6–1
2012	Z1 RR	Apr 2012	Guadalajara (MEX)	Trinidad and Tobago	Clay	Yolande Leacock	W	6–4, 3–6, 6–1
