= Mariaryeni Gutiérrez =

Venezuelan tennis player

- Full name: Mariaryeni Gutiérrez Soto
- Country (sports): Venezuela
- Born: 5 May 1989 (age 37) Caracas, Venezuela
- Plays: Right-handed
- Prize money: $6,062

Singles
- Career record: 30–35
- Career titles: 0
- Highest ranking: No. 836 (29 June 2015)

Doubles
- Career record: 15–25
- Career titles: 0
- Highest ranking: No. 788 (8 June 2015)
Medal record
Central American and Caribbean Games
Silver medal – second place	2014 Veracruz	Women's team

Mariaryeni Gutiérrez Soto (born 5 May 1989) is a Venezuelan former tennis player.

== Career ==
Born in Caracas, Gutiérrez played collegiate tennis in the United States for Lamar University from 2006 to 2010. A three-time All-Southland player, she was a member of Lamar's title winning team in 2008 and in her senior season was named Southland Player of the Year, after going undefeated in singles (21–0).

Gutiérrez competed for the Venezuela Fed Cup team in both 2005 and 2015 with a win-loss record of 0–5. She was a team silver medalist at the 2014 Central American and Caribbean Games and also represented Venezuela at the 2015 Pan American Games.

== ITF finals ==
=== Doubles (0–2) ===
Result	No.	Date	Tournament	Surface	Partner	Opponents	Score
Loss	1.	Nov 2014	ITF Pereira, Colombia	Clay	(United States) Alexandra Valenstein	(United Kingdom) Anna Brogan (Venezuela) María Herazo González	3–6, 2–6
Loss	2.	May 2015	ITF Antalya, Turkey	Hard	(Spain) María Martínez Martínez	(Turkey) Ayla Aksu (Turkey) Melis Sezer	5–7, 2–6
