= 2006 Fed Cup Americas Zone =

Subsection of tennis competition

The Americas Zone was one of three zones of regional competition in the 2006 Fed Cup.

== Group I ==
- Venue: Club Campestre de Medellín, Medellín, Colombia (outdoor clay)
- Date: 19–22 April

The eight teams were divided into two pools of four teams. The teams that finished first in the pools played-off to determine which team would partake in the World Group II Play-offs. The four nations coming last or second-to-last in the pools also played-off to determine which would be relegated to Group II for 2007.

=== Pools ===
	Pool A	CAN	MEX	CHI	URU
1	Canada (3–0)		3–0	3–0	3–0
2	Mexico (2–1)	0–3		3–0	2–1
3	Chile (1–2)	0–3	0–3		2–1
4	Uruguay (0–3)	0–3	1–2	1–2	

	Pool B	BRA	PUR	COL	CUB
1	Brazil (3–0)		2–1	3–0	3–0
2	Puerto Rico (2–1)	1–2		2–1	2–1
3	Colombia (1–2)	0–3	1–2		3–0
4	Cuba (0–3)	0–3	1–2	0–3	

=== Play-offs ===
Placing	A Team	Score	B Team
Promotion	Canada	3–0	Brazil
3rd–4th	Mexico	1–2	Puerto Rico
Relegation	Chile	2–0	Cuba
Relegation	Uruguay	1–2	Colombia

- Canada advanced to 2006 World Group II Play-offs.
- Cuba and Uruguay was relegated to Group II for 2007.

== Group II ==
- Venue: Parque del Este, Santo Domingo, Dominican Republic (outdoor hard)
- Date: 17–20 April

The six teams were divided into two pools of three teams. The teams that finished first and second in the pools played-off to determine which team would advance to Group I for 2007.

=== Pools ===
	Pool A	VEN	BOL	PAN
1	Venezuela (2–0)		3–0	3–0
2	Bolivia (1–1)	0–3		3–0
3	Panama (0–2)	0–3	0–3	

	Pool B	DOM	PAR	BER
1	Dominican Republic (2–0)		3–0	3–0
2	Paraguay (1–1)	0–3		3–0
3	Bermuda (0–2)	0–3	0–3	

=== Play-offs ===
Placing	A Team	Score	B Team
Promotion	Venezuela	2–0	Paraguay
Promotion	Bolivia	0–2	Dominican Republic
5th–6th	Panama	1–2	Bermuda

- Venezuela and Dominican Republic advanced to Group I for 2007.

== See also ==
- Fed Cup structure
