= Francesca Segarelli =

Dominican tennis player

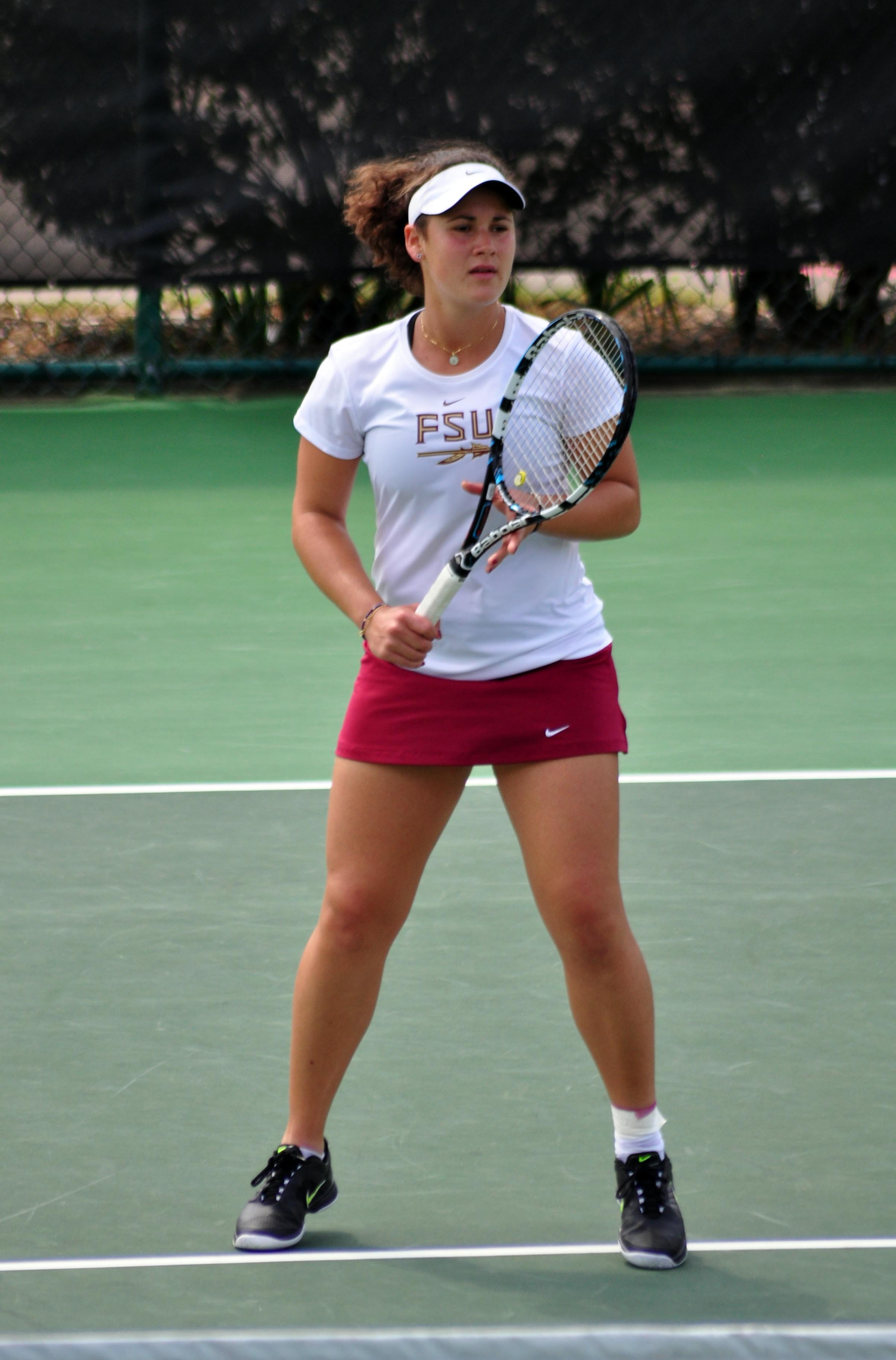
- Segarelli playing for the Florida State Seminoles in 2013
- Country (sports): Dominican Republic
- Born: 5 September 1990 (age 35) Rome, Italy
- Height: 5 ft 7 in (1.70 m)
- Prize money: $25,366

Singles
- Career record: 80–75
- Highest ranking: No. 424 (15 June 2015)

Doubles
- Career record: 83–54
- Career titles: 8 ITF
- Highest ranking: No. 342 (2 November 2015)
Medal record
Representing Dominican Republic
Central American and Caribbean Games
Silver medal – second place	2010 Mayagüez	women's doubles
Bronze medal – third place	2014 Veracruz	women's singles
Bronze medal – third place	2014 Veracruz	mixed doubles

Francesca Segarelli (born 5 September 1990) is a Dominican former professional tennis player.

Segarelli won eight doubles titles on the ITF Circuit in her career. On 15 June 2015, she reached her best singles ranking of world No. 424. On 2 November 2015, she peaked at No. 342 in the doubles rankings.

Since her debut for the Dominican Republic Fed Cup team in 2005, Segarelli has accumulated a win–loss record of 27–15 in international competition.

== ITF Circuit finals ==
=== Singles (0–1) ===
Legend
$50,000 tournaments
$25,000 tournaments
$10,000 tournaments

Result	Date	Tournament	Surface	Opponent	Score
Loss	Nov 2013	ITF Lima, Peru	Clay	(Mexico) Ana Sofía Sánchez	3–6, 7–5, 4–6

=== Doubles (8–4) ===
Legend $100,000 tournaments $75,000 tournaments $50,000 tournaments $25,000 tournaments $10/15,000 tournaments	Finals by surface Hard (5–1) Clay (3–3)

Result	No.	Date	Tier	Tournament	Surface	Partner	Opponents	Score
Win	1.	8 December 2008	10,000	ITF Havana, Cuba	Hard	(Venezuela) Josymar Escalona	(Brazil) Ana Clara Duarte (Belgium) Davinia Lobbinger	7–5, 6–4
Win	2.	1 June 2009	10,000	ITF Managua, Nicaragua	Hard	(Mexico) Victoria Lozano	(United States) Tristen Dewar (Russia) Yana Koroleva	6–1, 6–2
Win	3.	27 May 2013	10,000	ITF Quintana Roo, Mexico	Hard	(United States) Danielle Mills	(Mexico) Ana Sofía Sánchez (Guatemala) Daniela Schippers	6–2, 6–4
Win	4.	21 October 2013	10,000	ITF Quintana Roo, Mexico	Hard	(Guatemala) Daniela Schippers	(Mexico) Constanza Gorches (Mexico) Jessica Hinojosa Gómez	7–5, 7–6^{(2)}
Win	5.	4 November 2013	10,000	ITF Lima, Peru	Clay	(Argentina) Aldana Ciccarelli	(Argentina) Daniela Farfán (Peru) Katherine Miranda Chang	6–2, 4–6, [10–5]
Win	6.	11 November 2013	10,000	ITF Lima, Peru	Clay	(Mexico) Ana Sofía Sánchez	(Argentina) Daniela Farfán (Colombia) María Fernanda Herazo	0–6, 6–4, [10–8]
Loss	1.	12 May 2014	10,000	ITF Pula, Italy	Clay	(Argentina) Carla Lucero	(Colombia) Yuliana Lizarazo (Italy) Alice Matteucci	1–6, 5–7
Win	7.	18 August 2014	10,000	ITF Duino-Aurisina, Italy	Clay	(Italy) Deborah Chiesa	(Australia) Alexandra Nancarrow (Hungary) Naomi Totka	7–6^{(3)}, 6–2
Loss	2.	6 October 2014	10,000	ITF Lima, Peru	Clay	(Argentina) Victoria Bosio	(Chile) Fernanda Brito (Brazil) Eduarda Piai	6–4, 6–7^{(9)}, [6–10]
Loss	3.	4 May 2015	15,000	ITF Obregón, Mexico	Hard	(Mexico) Ana Sofía Sánchez	(Mexico) Victoria Rodríguez (Mexico) Marcela Zacarías	3–6, 1–6
Win	8.	8 June 2015	10,000	ITF Manzanillo, Mexico	Hard	(Mexico) Camila Fuentes	(Mexico) Constanza Gorches (Mexico) Giuliana Olmos	2–6, 6–4, [10–5]
Loss	4.	19 October 2015	25,000+H	ITF Bucaramanga, Colombia	Clay	(Paraguay) Montserrat González	(Bulgaria) Aleksandrina Naydenova (Chile) Daniela Seguel	2–6, 6–7^{(3)}
