= 2005 Fed Cup World Group II play-offs =

Part of tennis tournament

The 2005 World Group II play-offs were four ties which involved the losing nations of the World Group II and four nations from the three Zonal Group I competitions. Nations that won their play-off ties entered the 2006 World Group II, while losing nations joined their respective zonal groups.

== Puerto Rico vs. Indonesia ==
Puerto Rico
1
Albergue Olímpico, Salinas, Puerto Rico
9–10 July 2005
Plexicushion (outdoors)

Indonesia
4

			1	2	3
1	(Puerto Rico) (Indonesia)	Kristina Brandi; Romana Tedjakusuma	6; 4	6; 3
2	(Puerto Rico) (Indonesia)	Vilmarie Castellvi; Wynne Prakusya	3; 6	4; 6
3	(Puerto Rico) (Indonesia)	Kristina Brandi; Wynne Prakusya	4; 6	2; 6
4	(Puerto Rico) (Indonesia)	Vilmarie Castellvi; Romana Tedjakusuma	2; 6	2; 6
5	(Puerto Rico) (Indonesia)	Vilmarie Castellvi / Jessica Roland-Rosario; Ayu-Fani Damayanti / Wynne Prakusya	2; 6	0; 6

== Japan vs. Bulgaria ==
Japan
4
Ariake Colosseum, Tokyo, Japan
9–10 July 2005
Plexipave (outdoors)

Bulgaria
1

			1	2	3
1	(Japan) (Bulgaria)	Akiko Morigami; Sesil Karatantcheva	2; 6	7^{7} 6^{4}	6; 0
2	(Japan) (Bulgaria)	Aiko Nakamura; Magdalena Maleeva	6; 3	4; 6	3; 6
3	(Japan) (Bulgaria)	Akiko Morigami; Magdalena Maleeva	7^{7} 6^{3}	6; 3
4	(Japan) (Bulgaria)	Aiko Nakamura; Sesil Karatantcheva	6; 4	7^{7} 6^{2}
5	(Japan) (Bulgaria)	Rika Fujiwara / Akiko Morigami; Tsvetana Pironkova / Maria Penkova	6; 1	6; 2

== Thailand vs. Slovakia ==
Thailand
4
Bangkok University, Pathum Thani, Thailand
9–10 July 2005
Plexipave (outdoors)

Slovakia
1

			1	2	3
1	(Thailand) (Slovakia)	Suchanun Viratprasert; Dominika Cibulková	6; 4	6; 4
2	(Thailand) (Slovakia)	Tamarine Tanasugarn; Ľubomíra Kurhajcová	6; 2	4; 6	0; 6
3	(Thailand) (Slovakia)	Tamarine Tanasugarn; Magdaléna Rybáriková	6; 1	6; 2
4	(Thailand) (Slovakia)	Suchanun Viratprasert; Ľubomíra Kurhajcová	6; 4	6; 2
5	(Thailand) (Slovakia)	Montinee Tangphong / Napaporn Tongsalee; Dominika Cibulková / Magdaléna Rybáriková	3; 6	6; 1	7; 5

== China vs. Slovenia ==
China
4
Beijing Tennis Center, Beijing, China
9–10 July 2005
Decoturf II (indoors)

Slovenia
1

			1	2	3
1	(China) (Slovenia)	Zheng Jie; Katarina Srebotnik	6^{5} 7^{7}	6; 3	3; 6
2	(China) (Slovenia)	Li Na; Andreja Klepač	6; 1	6; 3
3	(China) (Slovenia)	Li Na; Katarina Srebotnik	6; 1	6; 2
4	(China) (Slovenia)	Zheng Jie; Andreja Klepač	6; 3	6; 1
5	(China) (Slovenia)	Li Ting / Sun Tiantian; Tina Križan / Sandra Volk	6; 2	6; 0

== See also ==
- Fed Cup structure
