= 2006 Fed Cup =

International women's tennis competition

Details
- Duration: 22 April – 17 September
- Edition: 44th

Achievements (singles)

The 2006 Fed Cup was the 44th edition of the most important competition between national teams in women's tennis.

The final took place at Spiroudome in Charleroi, Belgium, on 16–17 September. The home team, Belgium, lost to Italy, 2–3, giving Italy their first title in their first final and Belgium's second final.

== World Group ==
Participating teams
Austria	Belgium	France	Germany
Italy	Russia	Spain	United States

=== Draw ===
Quarterfinals; 22–23 April
Liège, Belgium (Indoor hard)
1	Russia	2
Belgium	3
Ettenheim, Germany (Outdoor clay)
Germany	2
4	United States	3
Valencia, Spain (Outdoor clay)
3	Spain	5
Austria	0
Nancy, France (Indoor clay)
Italy	4
2	France	1

Semifinals; 15–16 July
Ostend, Belgium (Indoor hard)
Belgium	4
4	United States	1
Zaragoza, Spain (Outdoor clay)
3	Spain	1
Italy	3

Final; 16–17 September
Charleroi, Belgium (Indoor hard)
Belgium	2
Italy	3

== World Group play-offs ==
The four losing teams in the World Group first round ties (Austria, France, Germany and Russia), and four winners of the World Group II ties (China, Croatia, Czech Republic and Japan) entered the draw for the World Group play-offs.

Date: 15–16 July

Venue	Surface	Home team	Score	Visiting team
Tokyo, Japan	Indoor hard	Japan	5–0	Austria
Cagnes-sur-Mer, France	Outdoor clay	France	3–2	Czech Republic
Beijing, China	Indoor hard	China	4–1	Germany
Umag, Croatia	Outdoor clay	Croatia	2–3	Russia

== World Group II ==
The World Group II was the second highest level of Fed Cup competition in 2006. Winners will advance to the World Group play-offs, and losers played in the World Group II play-offs.

Date: 22–23 April

Venue	Surface	Home team	Score	Visiting team
Tokyo, Japan	Indoor hard	Japan	4–1	Switzerland
Zagreb, Croatia	Indoor carpet	Croatia	3–2	Argentina
Bangkok, Thailand	Outdoor hard	Thailand	1–4	Czech Republic
Jakarta, Indonesia	Outdoor hard	Indonesia	0–4	China

== World Group II play-offs ==
The four losing teams from World Group II (Argentina, Indonesia, Switzerland and Thailand) played off against qualifiers from Zonal Group I. Two teams qualified from Europe/Africa Zone (Israel and Slovakia), one team from the Asia/Oceania Zone (Australia), and one team from the Americas Zone (Canada).

Date: 14–15 July

Venue	Surface	Home team	Score	Visiting team
Ramat HaSharon, Israel	Outdoor hard	Israel	w/o	Indonesia
Edmonton, Canada	Outdoor hard	Canada	3–2	Argentina
Bratislava, Slovakia	Indoor hard	Slovakia	5–0	Thailand
Chavannes-de-Bogis, Switzerland	Outdoor hard	Switzerland	0–5	Australia

== Americas Zone ==
- Nations in **bold** advanced to the higher level of competition.
- Nations in italics were relegated down to a lower level of competition.

=== Group I ===
Venue: Club Campestre de Medellín, Medellín, Colombia (outdoor clay)

Dates: 19–22 April

Participating teams

- Brazil
- **Canada**
- Chile
- Colombia
- Cuba
- Mexico
- Puerto Rico
- Uruguay

=== Group II ===
Venue: Parque del Este, Santo Domingo, Dominican Republic (outdoor hard)

Dates: 18–20 April

Participating teams

- Bermuda
- Bolivia
- **Dominican Republic**
- Panama
- Paraguay
- **Venezuela**

== Asia/Oceania Zone ==
- Nations in **bold** advanced to the higher level of competition.
- Nations in italics were relegated down to a lower level of competition.

=== Group I ===
Venue: Olympic Park, Seoul, South Korea (outdoor hard)

Dates: 20–22 April

Participating teams

- **Australia**
- Chinese Taipei
- India
- New Zealand
- Philippines
- South Korea
- Uzbekistan

=== Group II ===
Venue: Olympic Park, Seoul, South Korea (outdoor hard)

Dates: 20–21 April

Participating teams

- **Hong Kong**
- **Kazakhstan**
- Singapore
- Syria

== Europe/Africa Zone ==
- Nations in **bold** advanced to the higher level of competition.
- Nations in italics were relegated down to a lower level of competition.

=== Group I ===
Venue: TC Lokomotiv, Plovdiv, Bulgaria (outdoor clay)

Dates: 17–22 April

Participating teams

- Belarus
- Bulgaria
- Denmark
- Estonia
- Finland
- Great Britain
- Hungary
- **Israel**
- Luxembourg
- Netherlands
- Romania
- Serbia and Montenegro
- **Slovakia**
- Slovenia
- South Africa
- Sweden
- Ukraine

=== Group II ===
Venue: Club Ali Bey, Manavgat, Antalya, Turkey (outdoor clay)

Dates: 26–29 April

Participating teams

- Georgia
- Greece
- Ireland
- Latvia
- **Lithuania**
- **Poland**
- Portugal

=== Group III ===
Venue: Club Ali Bey, Manavgat, Antalya, Turkey (outdoor clay)

Dates: 26–29 April

Participating teams

- Azerbaijan
- **Bosnia and Herzegovina**
- Botswana
- Egypt
- Iceland
- Liechtenstein
- Moldova
- Namibia
- **Norway**
- Tunisia
- Turkey

== Rankings ==
The rankings were measured after the three points during the year that play took place, and were collated by combining points earned from the previous four years.

24 April
Rank	Nation	Points	Move
1	Russia	35,267.5	Steady
2	France	27,910.0	Steady
3	Spain	14,502.5	Steady
4	United States	14,275.0	Steady
5	Belgium	9,987.5	▲1
6	Italy	8,855.0	▲2
7	Austria	7,875.0	▼2
8	Slovakia	7,077.5	▼1
9	Germany	4,762.5	Steady
10	Japan	4,437.5	▲4

17 July
Rank	Nation	Points	Move
1	Russia	31,960.0	Steady
2	France	23,292.5	Steady
3	Belgium	14,592.5	▲2
4	Italy	13,510.0	▲2
5	United States	11,442.5	▼1
6	Spain	10,957.5	▼3
7	China	5,822.5	▲6
8	Japan	5,767.5	▲2
9	Slovakia	5,407.55	▼1
10	Austria	5,030.0	▼3

18 September
Rank	Nation	Points	Move
1	Russia	27,860.0	Steady
2	Italy	21,690.0	▲2
3	France	21,247.5	▼1
4	Belgium	14,592.5	▼1
5	United States	11,442.5	Steady
6	Spain	10,957.5	Steady
7	China	5,822.5	Steady
8	Japan	5,767.5	Steady
9	Austria	5,030.0	▲1
10	Canada	3,995.0	▲1
