= List of tennis families =

== Africa ==
Country of origin	Person 1	Person 2	Relationship	Ref.
Algeria	Abdeslam Mahmoudi	Noureddine Mahmoudi	Son	
Algeria	Noureddine Mahmoudi	Abdeslam Mahmoudi	Father	
Egypt	Karim Hossam	Youssef Hossam	Brother	
Egypt	Youssef Hossam	Karim Hossam	Brother	
Egypt	Adli El Shafei	Adli El Shafei II	Grandson	
Egypt	Adli El Shafei	Ismail El Shafei	Son	
Egypt	Adli El Shafei II	Adli El Shafei	Grandfather	
Egypt	Adli El Shafei II	Ismail El Shafei	Father	
Egypt	Ismail El Shafei	Adli El Shafei	Father	
Egypt	Ismail El Shafei	Adli El Shafei II	Son	
Egypt	Mayar Sherif	Rana Sherif Ahmed	Sister	
Egypt	Rana Sherif Ahmed	Mayar Sherif	Sister	
Ivory Coast	Claude N'Goran	Clément N'Goran	Brother	
Ivory Coast	Clément N'Goran	Claude N'Goran	Brother	
Madagascar	Dally Randriantefy	Natacha Randriantefy	Sister	
Madagascar	Natacha Randriantefy	Dally Randriantefy	Sister	
Morocco	Nadia Lalami	Younes Lalami Laaroussi	Brother	
Morocco	Younes Lalami Laaroussi	Nadia Lalami	Sister	
Morocco	Adam Moundir	Sarah Moundir	Sister	
Namibia	Lesedi Sheya Jacobs	Tukhula Jacobs	Brother	
Namibia	Tukhula Jacobs	Lesedi Sheya Jacobs	Sister	
Nigeria	Tony Mmoh	Michael Mmoh	Son	
South Africa	Daphne Botha	Andrew Pattison	Husband	
South Africa	Trevor Fancutt	Charlie Fancutt	Son	
South Africa	Trevor Fancutt	Michael Fancutt	Son	
South Africa	Trevor Fancutt	Thomas Fancutt	Grandson	
South Africa	Trevor Fancutt	Daphne Seeney	Wife	
South Africa	Clinton Ferreira	Ellis Ferreira	Brother	
South Africa	Ellis Ferreira	Clinton Ferreira	Brother	
South Africa	Brent Haygarth	Kirk Haygarth	Brother	
South Africa	Brent Haygarth	Renée Schuurman	Mother	
South Africa	Kirk Haygarth	Brent Haygarth	Brother	
South Africa	Kirk Haygarth	Renée Schuurman	Mother	
South Africa	Ilana Kloss	Billie Jean King	Wife	
South Africa	Joan Koudelka	Štěpán Koudelka	Husband	
South Africa	Barry Moir	Kevin Moir	Brother	
South Africa	Kevin Moir	Barry Moir	Brother	
South Africa	Frank Punčec	Franjo Punčec	Father	
South Africa	Elna Reinach	Monica Reinach	Sister	
South Africa	Monica Reinach	Elna Reinach	Sister	
South Africa	Colin Robbins	Billie Tapscott	Wife	
South Africa	Renée Schuurman	Brent Haygarth	Son	
South Africa	Renée Schuurman	Kirk Haygarth	Son	
South Africa	Billie Tapscott	Colin Robbins	Husband	
South Africa	Billie Tapscott	Lionel Tapscott	Brother	
South Africa	Lionel Tapscott	Billie Tapscott	Sister	
Togo	Jean-Kome Loglo	Komlavi Loglo	Brother	
Togo	Komlavi Loglo	Jean-Kome Loglo	Brother	
Tunisia	Skander Mansouri	Yasmine Mansouri	Sister	
Zimbabwe	Byron Black	Cara Black	Sister	
Zimbabwe	Byron Black	Don Black	Father	
Zimbabwe	Byron Black	Wayne Black	Brother	
Zimbabwe	Cara Black	Byron Black	Brother	
Zimbabwe	Cara Black	Don Black	Father	
Zimbabwe	Cara Black	Wayne Black	Brother	
Zimbabwe	Don Black	Byron Black	Son	
Zimbabwe	Don Black	Cara Black	Daughter	
Zimbabwe	Don Black	Wayne Black	Son	
Zimbabwe	Wayne Black	Byron Black	Brother	
Zimbabwe	Wayne Black	Cara Black	Sister	
Zimbabwe	Wayne Black	Don Black	Father	
Zimbabwe	Wayne Black	Irina Selyutina	Wife	
Zimbabwe	Colin Dowdeswell	Roger Dowdeswell	Brother	
Zimbabwe	Roger Dowdeswell	Colin Dowdeswell	Brother	
Zimbabwe	Benjamin Lock	Courtney John Lock	Brother	
Zimbabwe	Courtney John Lock	Benjamin Lock	Brother	
Zimbabwe	Andrew Pattison	Daphne Botha	Wife	

== Asia ==
Country of origin	Person 1	Person 2	Relationship	Ref.
Bahrain	Abdulkarim Abdulnabi	Hasan Abdulnabi	Brother	
Bahrain	Hasan Abdulnabi	Abdulkarim Abdulnabi	Brother	
Georgia	Aleksandre Metreveli	Alex Metreveli	Grandfather	
Georgia	Alex Metreveli	Aleksandre Metreveli	Grandson	
Hong Kong	Cody Wong	Jack Wong	Brother	
Hong Kong	Jack Wong	Cody Wong	Brother	
India	Anand Amritraj	Ashok Amritraj	Brother	
India	Anand Amritraj	Stephen Amritraj	Son	
India	Anand Amritraj	Prakash Amritraj	Nephew	
India	Anand Amritraj	Vijay Amritraj	Brother	
India	Ashok Amritraj	Anand Amritraj	Brother	
India	Ashok Amritraj	Prakash Amritraj	Nephew	
India	Ashok Amritraj	Stephen Amritraj	Nephew	
India	Ashok Amritraj	Vijay Amritraj	Brother	
India	Prakash Amritraj	Anand Amritraj	Uncle	
India	Prakash Amritraj	Ashok Amritraj	Uncle	
India	Prakash Amritraj	Stephen Amritraj	Cousin	
India	Prakash Amritraj	Vijay Amritraj	Father	
India	Stephen Amritraj	Anand Amritraj	Father	
India	Stephen Amritraj	Ashok Amritraj	Uncle	
India	Stephen Amritraj	Prakash Amritraj	Cousin	
India	Stephen Amritraj	Vijay Amritraj	Uncle	
India	Stephen Amritraj	Alison Riske-Amritraj	Wife	
India	Vijay Amritraj	Anand Amritraj	Brother	
India	Vijay Amritraj	Ashok Amritraj	Brother	
India	Vijay Amritraj	Prakash Amritraj	Son	
India	Vijay Amritraj	Stephen Amritraj	Nephew	
India	Ankita Bhambri	Prerna Bhambri	Cousin	
India	Ankita Bhambri	Sanaa Bhambri	Sister	
India	Ankita Bhambri	Yuki Bhambri	Brother	
India	Prerna Bhambri	Ankita Bhambri	Cousin	
India	Prerna Bhambri	Sanaa Bhambri	Cousin	
India	Prerna Bhambri	Yuki Bhambri	Cousin	
India	Sanaa Bhambri	Ankita Bhambri	Sister	
India	Sanaa Bhambri	Prerna Bhambri	Cousin	
India	Sanaa Bhambri	Yuki Bhambri	Brother	
India	Yuki Bhambri	Ankita Bhambri	Sister	
India	Yuki Bhambri	Prerna Bhambri	Cousin	
India	Yuki Bhambri	Sanaa Bhambri	Sister	
India	Athar-Ali Fyzee	Hassan Ali Fyzee	Brother	
India	Hassan Ali Fyzee	Athar-Ali Fyzee	Brother	
India	Nitin Kirtane	Sandeep Kirtane	Cousin	
India	Sandeep Kirtane	Nitin Kirtane	Cousin	
India	Ramanathan Krishnan	Ramesh Krishnan	Son	
India	Ramesh Krishnan	Ramanathan Krishnan	Father	
India	Harsh Mankad	Nirupama Mankad	Mother	
India	Nirupama Mankad	Harsh Mankad	Son	
India	Gaurav Misra	Sumant Misra	Father	
India	Sumant Misra	Gaurav Misra	Son	
India	Divij Sharan	Samantha Murray Sharan	Wife	
India	Chandril Sood	Lakshit Sood	Twin brother	
India	Lakshit Sood	Chandril Sood	Twin brother	
Indonesia	Liza Andriyani	Sulistyo Wibowo	Brother	
Indonesia	Yayuk Basuki	Hary Suharyadi	Husband	
Indonesia	Beatrice Gumulya	Sandy Gumulya	Sister	
Indonesia	Sandy Gumulya	Beatrice Gumulya	Sister	
Indonesia	Aga Soemarno	Yolanda Soemarno	Mother	
Indonesia	Yolanda Soemarno	Aga Soemarno	Son	
Indonesia	Lita Liem Sugiarto	Sutarjo Sugiarto	Husband	
Indonesia	Sutarjo Sugiarto	Lita Liem Sugiarto	Wife	
Indonesia	Hary Suharyadi	Yayuk Basuki	Wife	
Indonesia	Lukky Tedjamukti	Arianne Hartono	Niece	
Indonesia	Donald Wailan-Walalangi	Waya Walalangi	Sister	
Indonesia	Waya Walalangi	Donald Wailan-Walalangi	Brother	
Indonesia	Sulistyo Wibowo	Liza Andriyani	Sister	
Iran	Mohammad Hossein Akbari	Taghi Akbari	Brother	
Iran	Taghi Akbari	Mohammad Hossein Akbari	Brother	
Iran	Matthew Farhang Mohtadi	Nick Mohtadi	Son	
Israel	Julia Glushko	Lina Glushko	Sister	
Israel	Lina Glushko	Julia Glushko	Sister	
Israel	Dudi Sela	Ofer Sela	Brother	
Israel	Ofer Sela	Dudi Sela	Brother	
Israel	Anna Smashnova	Claudio Pistolesi	Ex-husband	
Japan	Haruka Inoue	Maiko Inoue	Sister	
Japan	Maiko Inoue	Haruka Inoue	Sister	
Japan	Maiko Inoue	Bumpei Sato	Husband	
Japan	Kosei Kamo	Sachiko Kamo	Sister	
Japan	Sachiko Kamo	Kosei Kamo	Brother	
Japan	Akiko Kijimuta	Naoko Kijimuta	Sister	
Japan	Naoko Kijimuta	Akiko Kijimuta	Sister	
Japan	Atsushi Miyagi	Reiko Miyagi	Sister	
Japan	Reiko Miyagi	Atsushi Miyagi	Brother	
Japan	Mari Osaka	Naomi Osaka	Sister	
Japan	Naomi Osaka	Mari Osaka	Sister	
Japan	Toshiaki Sakai	Toshiro Sakai	Father	
Japan	Toshiro Sakai	Toshiaki Sakai	Son	
Japan	Bumpei Sato	Maiko Inoue	Wife	
Japan	Junko Sawamatsu	Kazuko Sawamatsu	Sister	
Japan	Junko Sawamatsu	Naoko Sawamatsu	Daughter	
Japan	Kazuko Sawamatsu	Junko Sawamatsu	Sister	
Japan	Kazuko Sawamatsu	Naoko Sawamatsu	Niece	
Japan	Naoko Sawamatsu	Junko Sawamatsu	Mother	
Japan	Naoko Sawamatsu	Kazuko Sawamatsu	Aunt	
Japan	Erika Sema	Yurika Sema	Sister	
Japan	Yurika Sema	Erika Sema	Sister	
Japan	Yosuke Watanuki	Yusuke Watanuki	Brother	
Japan	Yusuke Watanuki	Yosuke Watanuki	Brother	
Japan	Akiko Yonemura	Tomoko Yonemura	Sister	
Japan	Tomoko Yonemura	Akiko Yonemura	Sister	
Kazakhstan	Timur Khabibulin	Albina Khabibulina	Sister	
Kazakhstan	Evgeny Korolev	Anna Kournikova	Cousin	
Kazakhstan	Amina Rakhim	Madina Rakhim	Sister	
Kazakhstan	Madina Rakhim	Amina Rakhim	Sister	
Kazakhstan	Irina Selyutina	Wayne Black	Husband	
Kazakhstan	Alexander Shevchenko	Anastasia Potapova	Wife	
Oman	Fatma Al-Nabhani	Mohammed Al-Nabhani	Brother	
Oman	Mohammed Al-Nabhani	Fatma Al-Nabhani	Sister	
Pakistan	Abid Ali Akbar	Ahmed Ali Akbar	Brother	
Pakistan	Ahmed Ali Akbar	Abid Ali Akbar	Brother	
Philippines	Miguel Dungo Jr.	Miguel Dungo III	Son	
Philippines	Miguel Dungo III	Miguel Dungo Jr.	Father	
Qatar	Mousa Shanan Zayed	Mubarak Shannan Zayid	Brother	
Qatar	Mubarak Shannan Zayid	Mousa Shanan Zayed	Brother	
Saudi Arabia	Ammar Alhaqbani	Saud Alhogbani	Brother	
Saudi Arabia	Saud Alhogbani	Ammar Alhaqbani	Brother	
South Korea	Chung Hong	Chung Hyeon	Brother	
South Korea	Chung Hyeon	Chung Hong	Brother	
Syria	Amer Naow	Hazem Naw	Brother	
Syria	Hazem Naw	Amer Naow	Brother	
Taiwan	Angel Chan	Latisha Chan	Sister	
Taiwan	Latisha Chan	Angel Chan	Sister	
Taiwan	Cho I-hsuan	Cho Yi-tsen	Sister	
Taiwan	Cho Yi-tsen	Cho I-hsuan	Sister	
Taiwan	Hsieh Cheng-peng	Hsieh Su-wei	Sister	
Taiwan	Hsieh Cheng-peng	Hsieh Yu-chieh	Sister	
Taiwan	Hsieh Su-wei	Hsieh Cheng-peng	Brother	
Taiwan	Hsieh Su-wei	Hsieh Yu-chieh	Sister	
Taiwan	Hsieh Yu-chieh	Hsieh Cheng-peng	Brother	
Taiwan	Hsieh Yu-chieh	Hsieh Su-wei	Sister	
Taiwan	Lee Kuan-yi	Lee Ya-hsuan	Sister	
Taiwan	Lee Ya-hsuan	Lee Kuan-yi	Brother	
Thailand	Palaphoom Kovapitukted	Punnin Kovapitukted	Sister	
Thailand	Punnin Kovapitukted	Palaphoom Kovapitukted	Brother	
Thailand	Sanchai Ratiwatana	Sonchat Ratiwatana	Twin brother	
Thailand	Sonchat Ratiwatana	Sanchai Ratiwatana	Twin brother	
United Arab Emirates	Abdulrahman Al Janahi	Fares Al Janahi	Brother	
United Arab Emirates	Abdulrahman Al Janahi	Hamad Abbas Janahi	Brother	
United Arab Emirates	Fares Al Janahi	Abdulrahman Al Janahi	Brother	
United Arab Emirates	Fares Al Janahi	Hamad Abbas Janahi	Brother	
United Arab Emirates	Hamad Abbas Janahi	Abdulrahman Al Janahi	Brother	
United Arab Emirates	Hamad Abbas Janahi	Fares Al Janahi	Brother	
Uzbekistan	Albina Khabibulina	Timur Khabibulin	Brother	

== Europe ==
Country of origin	Person 1	Person 2	Relationship	Ref.
Austria	Alex Antonitsch	Mira Antonitsch	Daughter	
Austria	Alex Antonitsch	Karin Oberleitner	Wife	
Austria	Mira Antonitsch	Alex Antonitsch	Father	
Austria	Mira Antonitsch	Karin Oberleitner	Mother	
Austria	Mira Antonitsch	Michael Oberleitner	Uncle	
Austria	Mira Antonitsch	Neil Oberleitner	Cousin	
Austria	Daniela Klemenschits	Sandra Klemenschits	Twin sister	
Austria	Sandra Klemenschits	Daniela Klemenschits	Twin sister	
Austria	Gerald Melzer	Jürgen Melzer	Brother	
Austria	Jürgen Melzer	Iveta Benešová	Ex-wife	
Austria	Jürgen Melzer	Gerald Melzer	Brother	
Austria	Karin Oberleitner	Alex Antonitsch	Husband	
Austria	Karin Oberleitner	Mira Antonitsch	Daughter	
Austria	Karin Oberleitner	Michael Oberleitner	Brother	
Austria	Karin Oberleitner	Neil Oberleitner	Nephew	
Austria	Michael Oberleitner	Mira Antonitsch	Niece	
Austria	Michael Oberleitner	Karin Oberleitner	Sister	
Austria	Michael Oberleitner	Neil Oberleitner	Son	
Austria	Neil Oberleitner	Mira Antonitsch	Cousin	
Austria	Neil Oberleitner	Karin Oberleitner	Aunt	
Austria	Neil Oberleitner	Michael Oberleitner	Father	
Austria	Luben Pampoulov	Bozhidar Pampoulov	Father	
Austria	Luben Pampoulov	Matei Pampoulov	Uncle	
Austria	Luben Pampoulov	Elena Pampoulova	Cousin	
Austria	Hans Priller	Ulrike Priller	Sister	
Austria	Ulrike Priller	Hans Priller	Brother	
Austria	Barbara Schett	Joshua Eagle	Husband	
Austria	Melanie Schnell	Lars Rehmann	Husband	
Austria	Dominic Thiem	Moritz Thiem	Brother	
Austria	Moritz Thiem	Dominic Thiem	Brother	
Belarus	Sergey Betov	Margarita Betova	Wife	
Belarus	Uladzimir Ignatik	Alexandra Cadanțu-Ignatik	Wife	
Belgium	Alain Brichant	Jacques Brichant	Father	
Belgium	Jacques Brichant	Alain Brichant	Son	
Belgium	Elke Clijsters	Kim Clijsters	Sister	
Belgium	Kim Clijsters	Elke Clijsters	Sister	
Belgium	Anne de Borman	Léopold de Borman	Son	
Belgium	Anne de Borman	Paul de Borman	Husband	
Belgium	Léopold de Borman	Anne de Borman	Mother	
Belgium	Léopold de Borman	Paul de Borman	Father	
Belgium	Paul de Borman	Anne de Borman	Wife	
Belgium	Paul de Borman	Léopold de Borman	Son	
Belgium	Tamaryn Hendler	Martin Emmrich	Husband	
Belgium	Christophe Rochus	Olivier Rochus	Brother	
Belgium	Olivier Rochus	Christophe Rochus	Brother	
Belgium	Kathleen Schuurmans	Alfonso González	Husband	
Belgium	Jean Washer	Philippe Washer	Son	
Belgium	Philippe Washer	Jean Washer	Father	
Bosnia and Herzegovina	Zoran Petković	Andrea Petkovic	Daughter	
Bulgaria	Yulia Berberian-Maleeva	Katerina Maleeva	Daughter	
Bulgaria	Yulia Berberian-Maleeva	Magdalena Maleeva	Daughter	
Bulgaria	Yulia Berberian-Maleeva	Manuela Maleeva	Daughter	
Bulgaria	Lia Karatancheva	Sesil Karatantcheva	Sister	
Bulgaria	Sesil Karatantcheva	Lia Karatancheva	Sister	
Bulgaria	Dimitar Kuzmanov	Dora Rangelova	Mother	
Bulgaria	Katerina Maleeva	Yulia Berberian-Maleeva	Mother	
Bulgaria	Katerina Maleeva	Magdalena Maleeva	Sister	
Bulgaria	Katerina Maleeva	Manuela Maleeva	Sister	
Bulgaria	Magdalena Maleeva	Yulia Berberian-Maleeva	Mother	
Bulgaria	Magdalena Maleeva	Katerina Maleeva	Sister	
Bulgaria	Magdalena Maleeva	Manuela Maleeva	Sister	
Bulgaria	Manuela Maleeva	Yulia Berberian-Maleeva	Mother	
Bulgaria	Manuela Maleeva	Katerina Maleeva	Sister	
Bulgaria	Manuela Maleeva	Magdalena Maleeva	Sister	
Bulgaria	Bozhidar Pampoulov	Luben Pampoulov	Son	
Bulgaria	Bozhidar Pampoulov	Matei Pampoulov	Twin brother	
Bulgaria	Bozhidar Pampoulov	Elena Pampoulova	Niece	
Bulgaria	Matei Pampoulov	Bozhidar Pampoulov	Twin brother	
Bulgaria	Matei Pampoulov	Luben Pampoulov	Nephew	
Bulgaria	Matei Pampoulov	Elena Pampoulova	Niece	
Bulgaria	Elena Pampoulova	Bozhidar Pampoulov	Uncle	
Bulgaria	Elena Pampoulova	Luben Pampoulov	Cousin	
Bulgaria	Elena Pampoulova	Matei Pampoulov	Uncle	
Bulgaria	Dora Rangelova	Dimitar Kuzmanov	Son	
Bulgaria	Radoslav Shandarov	Vasil Shandarov	Brother	
Bulgaria	Vasil Shandarov	Radoslav Shandarov	Brother	
Bulgaria	Desislava Topalova	Radoslava Topalova	Sister	
Bulgaria	Radoslava Topalova	Desislava Topalova	Sister	
Croatia	Ivana Abramović	Marija Abramović	Sister	
Croatia	Marija Abramović	Ivana Abramović	Sister	
Croatia	Ivica Ančić	Mario Ančić	Brother	
Croatia	Ivica Ančić	Sanja Ančić	Sister	
Croatia	Mario Ančić	Ivica Ančić	Brother	
Croatia	Mario Ančić	Sanja Ančić	Sister	
Croatia	Sanja Ančić	Ivica Ančić	Brother	
Croatia	Sanja Ančić	Mario Ančić	Brother	
Croatia	Marin Draganja	Tomislav Draganja	Brother	
Croatia	Tomislav Draganja	Marin Draganja	Brother	
Croatia	Vladimir Petrović	Glenn Petrovic	Son	
Croatia	Franjo Punčec	Frank Punčec	Son	
Croatia	Ivan Sabanov	Matej Sabanov	Twin brother	
Croatia	Matej Sabanov	Ivan Sabanov	Twin brother	
Croatia	Karolina Šprem	Marcos Baghdatis	Husband	
Cyprus	Marcos Baghdatis	Karolina Šprem	Wife	
Czech Republic	Iveta Benešová	Jürgen Melzer	Ex-husband	
Czech Republic	Stanislav Birner	Eva Birnerová	Daughter	
Czech Republic	Stanislav Birner	Hana Birnerová	Daughter	
Czech Republic	Eva Birnerová	Stanislav Birner	Father	
Czech Republic	Eva Birnerová	Hana Birnerová	Sister	
Czech Republic	Hana Birnerová	Stanislav Birner	Father	
Czech Republic	Hana Birnerová	Eva Birnerová	Sister	
Czech Republic	Kateřina Böhmová	Kateřina Skronská	Mother	
Czech Republic	Martin Damm	Martin Damm Jr.	Son	
Czech Republic	Brenda Fruhvirtová	Linda Fruhvirtová	Sister	
Czech Republic	Linda Fruhvirtová	Brenda Fruhvirtová	Sister	
Czech Republic	Petra Holubová	Julia Stusek	Daughter	
Czech Republic	Olga Hostáková	Annika Penickova	Daughter	
Czech Republic	Olga Hostáková	Kristina Penickova	Daughter	
Czech Republic	Jan Kodeš	Jan Kodeš Jr	Son	
Czech Republic	Jan Kodeš	Vlasta Vopičková	Sister	
Czech Republic	Jan Kodeš Jr	Jan Kodeš	Father	
Czech Republic	Jan Kodeš Jr	Vlasta Vopičková	Aunt	
Czech Republic	Petr Korda	Sebastian Korda	Son	
Czech Republic	Petr Korda	Regina Rajchrtová	Wife	
Czech Republic	Štěpán Koudelka	Joan Koudelka	Wife	
Czech Republic	Petr Kovačka	Alena Kovačková	Daughter	
Czech Republic	Petr Kovačka	Jana Kovačková	Daughter	
Czech Republic	Alena Kovačková	Petr Kovačka	Father	
Czech Republic	Alena Kovačková	Jana Kovačková	Father	
Czech Republic	Jana Kovačková	Petr Kovačka	Father	
Czech Republic	Jana Kovačková	Alena Kovačková	Sister	
Czech Republic	Jan Koželuh	Karel Koželuh	Brother	
Czech Republic	Jan Koželuh	Hana Sládková-Koželuhová	Niece	
Czech Republic	Jan Koželuh	Mirka Koželuhová	Great-niece	
Czech Republic	Karel Koželuh	Jan Koželuh	Brother	
Czech Republic	Karel Koželuh	Hana Sládková-Koželuhová	Niece	
Czech Republic	Karel Koželuh	Mirka Koželuhová	Great-niece	
Czech Republic	Mirka Koželuhová	Jan Koželuh	Great-uncle	
Czech Republic	Mirka Koželuhová	Karel Koželuh	Great-uncle	
Czech Republic	Petra Kvitová	Jiří Vaněk	Husband	
Czech Republic	Hana Mandlíková	Elizabeth Mandlik	Daughter	
Czech Republic	Helena Matouš	Milan Matouš	Husband	
Czech Republic	Milan Matouš	Helena Matouš	Wife	
Czech Republic	Ivo Minář	Jan Minář	Brother	
Czech Republic	Jan Minář	Ivo Minář	Brother	
Czech Republic	Jaroslav Navrátil	Michal Navrátil	Son	
Czech Republic	Michal Navrátil	Jaroslav Navrátil	Father	
Czech Republic	František Pála	Petr Pála	Son	
Czech Republic	Petr Pála	František Pála	Father	
Czech Republic	Karolína Plíšková	Kristýna Plíšková	Twin sister	
Czech Republic	Kristýna Plíšková	Karolína Plíšková	Twin sister	
Czech Republic	Jaroslav Pospíšil	Jana Pospíšilová	Sister	
Czech Republic	Jana Pospíšilová	Jaroslav Pospíšil	Brother	
Czech Republic	Regina Rajchrtová	Petr Korda	Husband	
Czech Republic	Regina Rajchrtová	Sebastian Korda	Son	
Czech Republic	David Rikl	Patrik Rikl	Son	
Czech Republic	Patrik Rikl	David Rikl	Father	
Czech Republic	Jan Šátral	Denisa Šátralová	Wife	
Czech Republic	Denisa Šátralová	Jan Šátral	Husband	
Czech Republic	Daniel Siniakov	Kateřina Siniaková	Sister	
Czech Republic	Kateřina Siniaková	Daniel Siniakov	Brother	
Czech Republic	Anna Sisková	Kateřina Sisková	Mother	
Czech Republic	Kateřina Sisková	Anna Sisková	Daughter	
Czech Republic	Milada Skrbková	Ladislav Žemla	Husband	
Czech Republic	Kateřina Skronská	Kateřina Böhmová	Daughter	
Czech Republic	Hana Sládková-Koželuhová	Jan Koželuh	Uncle	
Czech Republic	Hana Sládková-Koželuhová	Karel Koželuh	Uncle	
Czech Republic	Barbora Štefková	Sylvia Štefková	Mother	
Czech Republic	Sylvia Štefková	Barbora Štefková	Daughter	
Czech Republic	Radek Štěpánek	Nicole Vaidišová	Wife	
Czech Republic	Barbora Strýcová	Jakub Záhlava	Ex-husband	
Czech Republic	Cyril Suk	Helena Suková	Sister	
Czech Republic	Cyril Suk	Věra Suková	Mother	
Czech Republic	Helena Suková	Cyril Suk	Brother	
Czech Republic	Helena Suková	Věra Suková	Mother	
Czech Republic	Věra Suková	Cyril Suk	Son	
Czech Republic	Věra Suková	Helena Suková	Daughter	
Czech Republic	Renáta Tomanová	Pavel Vojtíšek	Husband	
Czech Republic	Nicole Vaidišová	Toby Kodat	Half-brother	
Czech Republic	Nicole Vaidišová	Radek Štěpánek	Wife	
Czech Republic	Jiří Vaněk	Marketa Kochta	Ex-wife	
Czech Republic	Jiří Vaněk	Petra Kvitová	Wife	
Czech Republic	Vlasta Vopičková	Jan Kodeš	Brother	
Czech Republic	Vlasta Vopičková	Jan Kodeš Jr.	Nephew	
Czech Republic	Sandra Záhlavová	Jakub Záhlava	Cousin	
Czech Republic	Ladislav Žemla	Milada Skrbková	Wife	
Denmark	Pia Balling	Merete Balling-Stockmann	Daughter	
Denmark	Merete Balling-Stockmann	Pia Balling	Mother	
Denmark	Kurt Nielsen	Frederik Nielsen	Grandson	
Denmark	Frederik Nielsen	Kurt Nielsen	Grandfather	
Denmark	Clara Tauson	Michael Tauson	Uncle	
Denmark	Michael Tauson	Clara Tauson	Niece	
Denmark	Einer Ulrich	Jørgen Ulrich	Son	
Denmark	Einer Ulrich	Torben Ulrich	Son	
Denmark	Jørgen Ulrich	Einer Ulrich	Father	
Denmark	Jørgen Ulrich	Torben Ulrich	Brother	
Denmark	Torben Ulrich	Einer Ulrich	Father	
Denmark	Torben Ulrich	Jørgen Ulrich	Brother	
Estonia	Maileen Nuudi	Tiit Nuudi	Father	
Estonia	Tiit Nuudi	Maileen Nuudi	Daughter	
Estonia	Aita Põldma	Jaak Põldma	Son	
Estonia	Jaak Põldma	Aita Põldma	Mother	
Estonia	Kristofer Siimar	Mattias Siimar	Twin brother	
Estonia	Mattias Siimar	Kristofer Siimar	Twin brother	
Finland	Heikki Hedman	Mika Hedman	Son	
Finland	Mika Hedman	Heikki Hedman	Father	
Finland	Henri Kontinen	Micke Kontinen	Brother	
Finland	Micke Kontinen	Henri Kontinen	Brother	
Finland	Emma Laine	Essi Laine	Sister	
Finland	Essi Laine	Emma Laine	Sister	
Finland	Birgitta Lindström	Christina Lindström	Sister	
Finland	Christina Lindström	Birgitta Lindström	Sister	
Finland	Otto Virtanen	Pasi Virtanen	Father	
Finland	Pasi Virtanen	Otto Virtanen	Son	
France	Blanche Amblard	Suzanne Amblard	Twin sister	
France	Suzanne Amblard	Blanche Amblard	Twin sister	
France	Julie Belgraver	John van Lottum	Uncle	
France	Julie Belgraver	Noëlle van Lottum	Mother	
France	Philippe Chatrier	Susan Partridge	Ex-wife	
France	Daniel Courcol	Jean-Pierre Courcol	Father	
France	Jean-Pierre Courcol	Daniel Courcol	Son	
France	Pierre Darmon	Rosie Reyes	Wife	
France	Alexia Dechaume-Balleret	Benjamin Balleret	Stepson	
France	Alexia Dechaume-Balleret	Bernard Balleret	Husband	
France	Aubane Droguet	Titouan Droguet	Brother	
France	Titouan Droguet	Aubane Droguet	Sister	
France	Ksenia Efremova	Julia Efremova	Mother	
France	Olivia Féry	Arthur Fery	Son	
France	Florence Gauvain	Hervé Gauvain	Husband	
France	Florence Gauvain	Sybille Gauvain	Daughter	
France	Hervé Gauvain	Florence Gauvain	Wife	
France	Hervé Gauvain	Sybille Gauvain	Daughter	
France	Sybille Gauvain	Florence Gauvain	Mother	
France	Sybille Gauvain	Hervé Gauvain	Father	
France	Hervé Grenier	Hugo Grenier	Son	
France	Hugo Grenier	Hervé Grenier	Father	
France	Amandine Hesse	Nicole Hesse-Cazaux	Mother	
France	Nicole Hesse-Cazaux	Amandine Hesse	Daughter	
France	François Jauffret	Capucine Jauffret	Granddaughter	
France	François Jauffret	Jean-Paul Jauffret	Brother	
France	Jean-Paul Jauffret	Capucine Jauffret	Great-niece	
France	Jean-Paul Jauffret	François Jauffret	Brother	
France	Nelly Landry	Pierre Henri Landry	Ex-husband	
France	Pierre Henri Landry	Nelly Landry	Ex-wife	
France	Yasmine Mansouri	Skander Mansouri	Brother	
France	Daryl Monfils	Gaël Monfils	Brother	
France	Gaël Monfils	Daryl Monfils	Brother	
France	Gaël Monfils	Elina Svitolina	Wife	
France	Daphnée Mpetshi Perricard	Giovanni Mpetshi Perricard	Brother	
France	Giovanni Mpetshi Perricard	Daphnée Mpetshi Perricard	Sister	
France	Francis Nys	Hugo Nys	Grandson	
France	Benoît Paire	Thomas Paire	Brother	
France	Thomas Paire	Benoît Paire	Brother	
France	Chloé Paquet	Benjamin Balleret	Cousin	
France	Chloé Paquet	Virginie Paquet	Aunt	
France	Chloé Paquet	Arthur Rinderknech	Cousin	
France	Chloé Paquet	Valentin Vacherot	Cousin	
France	Virginie Paquet	Chloé Paquet	Niece	
France	Virginie Paquet	Arthur Rinderknech	Son	
France	Jacques Renavand	Nicolas Renavand	Son	
France	Nicolas Renavand	Jacques Renavand	Father	
France	Arthur Rinderknech	Chloé Paquet	Cousin	
France	Arthur Rinderknech	Virginie Paquet	Mother	
France	Arthur Rinderknech	Valentin Vacherot	Cousin	
France	Christophe Roger-Vasselin	Édouard Roger-Vasselin	Son	
France	Édouard Roger-Vasselin	Christophe Roger-Vasselin	Father	
France	Monique Salfati	Gaetano Di Maso	Husband	
France	Sandrine Testud	Vittorio Magnelli	Husband	
France	André Vacherot	Marcel Vacherot	Brother	
France	Marcel Vacherot	André Vacherot	Brother	
Germany	Adriana Barna	Anca Barna	Sister	
Germany	Anca Barna	Adriana Barna	Sister	
Germany	Edda Buding	Ilse Buding	Sister	
Germany	Edda Buding	Ingo Buding	Brother	
Germany	Ilse Buding	Edda Buding	Sister	
Germany	Ilse Buding	Ingo Buding	Brother	
Germany	Ilse Buding	Mike Davies	Husband	
Germany	Ingo Buding	Edda Buding	Sister	
Germany	Ingo Buding	Ilse Buding	Sister	
Germany	Martin Emmrich	Thomas Emmrich	Father	
Germany	Martin Emmrich	Tamaryn Hendler	Wife	
Germany	Martin Emmrich	Michaëlla Krajicek	Ex-wife	
Germany	Thomas Emmrich	Martin Emmrich	Son	
Germany	Julia Görges	Wesley Koolhof	Husband	
Germany	Steffi Graf	Andre Agassi	Husband	
Germany	Sabine Haas	Tommy Haas	Brother	
Germany	Tommy Haas	Sabine Haas	Sister	
Germany	Carmen Klaschka	Sabine Klaschka	Sister	
Germany	Sabine Klaschka	Carmen Klaschka	Sister	
Germany	Marketa Kochta	Renata Kochta	Sister	
Germany	Marketa Kochta	Jiří Vaněk	Ex-husband	
Germany	Renata Kochta	Marketa Kochta	Sister	
Germany	Gabriela Kučerová	Magdalena Kučerová	Sister	
Germany	Magdalena Kučerová	Gabriela Kučerová	Sister	
Germany	Eva Lys	Lisa Matviyenko	Sister	
Germany	Lisa Matviyenko	Eva Lys	Sister	
Germany	Tore Meinecke	Céline Cohen	Wife	
Germany	Tayisiya Morderger	Yana Morderger	Twin sister	
Germany	Yana Morderger	Tayisiya Morderger	Twin sister	
Germany	Andrea Petkovic	Zoran Petković	Father	
Germany	Anna Petkovic	Mika Petkovic	Brother	
Germany	Mika Petkovic	Anna Petkovic	Sister	
Germany	Hans-Jürgen Pohmann	Inge Pohmann	Mother	
Germany	Inge Pohmann	Hans-Jürgen Pohmann	Son	
Germany	Lars Rehmann	Melanie Schnell	Wife	
Germany	Helga Schultze	Juan Gisbert Schultze	Nephew	
Germany	Julia Stusek	Petra Holubová	Mother	
Germany	Arne Thoms	Heike Thoms	Sister	
Germany	Heike Thoms	Arne Thoms	Brother	
Germany	Pavel Vojtíšek	Renáta Tomanová	Wife	
Germany	Jakub Záhlava	Barbora Strýcová	Ex-wife	
Germany	Jakub Záhlava	Sandra Záhlavová	Cousin	
Germany	Alexander Zverev	Alexander Zverev Sr.	Father	
Germany	Alexander Zverev	Irina Zvereva	Mother	
Germany	Alexander Zverev	Mischa Zverev	Brother	
Germany	Mischa Zverev	Alexander Zverev	Brother	
Germany	Mischa Zverev	Alexander Zverev Sr.	Father	
Germany	Mischa Zverev	Irina Zvereva	Mother	
Greece	Aristidis Akratopoulos	Konstantinos Akratopoulos	Brother	
Greece	Konstantinos Akratopoulos	Aristidis Akratopoulos	Brother	
Greece	Carol-Ann Kalogeropoulos	Nicholas Kalogeropoulos	Husband	
Greece	Nicholas Kalogeropoulos	Carol-Ann Kalogeropoulos	Wife	
Greece	George Kalovelonis	Markos Kalovelonis	Son	
Greece	Markos Kalovelonis	George Kalovelonis	Father	
Greece	Angeliki Kanellopoulou	Dimitra Pavlou	Niece	
Greece	Angeliki Kanellopoulou	Maria Sakkari	Daughter	
Greece	Nicolas Kelaidis	Lilian Drescher	Wife	
Greece	Dimitra Pavlou	Angeliki Kanellopoulou	Aunt	
Greece	Dimitra Pavlou	Maria Sakkari	Cousin	
Greece	Sapfo Sakellaridi	Dimitris Sakellaridis	Brother	
Greece	Sapfo Sakellaridi	Stefanos Sakellaridis	Brother	
Greece	Dimitris Sakellaridis	Sapfo Sakellaridi	Sister	
Greece	Dimitris Sakellaridis	Stefanos Sakellaridis	Brother	
Greece	Stefanos Sakellaridis	Sapfo Sakellaridi	Sister	
Greece	Stefanos Sakellaridis	Dimitris Sakellaridis	Brother	
Greece	Maria Sakkari	Angeliki Kanellopoulou	Mother	
Greece	Maria Sakkari	Dimitra Pavlou	Cousin	
Greece	Apostolos Tsitsipas	Julia Salnikova	Wife	
Greece	Apostolos Tsitsipas	Petros Tsitsipas	Son	
Greece	Apostolos Tsitsipas	Stefanos Tsitsipas	Son	
Greece	Petros Tsitsipas	Julia Salnikova	Mother	
Greece	Petros Tsitsipas	Apostolos Tsitsipas	Father	
Greece	Petros Tsitsipas	Stefanos Tsitsipas	Brother	
Greece	Stefanos Tsitsipas	Julia Salnikova	Mother	
Greece	Stefanos Tsitsipas	Apostolos Tsitsipas	Father	
Greece	Stefanos Tsitsipas	Petros Tsitsipas	Brother	
Hungary	Virág Csurgó	Adrienn Nagy	Daughter	
Hungary	Nóra Köves	Balázs Taróczy	Husband	
Hungary	Adrienn Nagy	Virág Csurgó	Mother	
Hungary	Andrea Noszály	Sándor Noszály	Brother	
Hungary	Sándor Noszály	Andrea Noszály	Sister	
Hungary	Ágnes Szávay	Blanka Szávay	Sister	
Hungary	Blanka Szávay	Ágnes Szávay	Sister	
Hungary	Balázs Taróczy	Nóra Köves	Wife	
Hungary	Luca Udvardy	Panna Udvardy	Sister	
Hungary	Panna Udvardy	Luca Udvardy	Sister	
Ireland	Grainger Chaytor	Tom Chaytor	Brother	
Ireland	Tom Chaytor	Grainger Chaytor	Brother	
Ireland	Blayney Hamilton	William Hamilton	Brother	
Ireland	Blayney Hamilton	Willoughby Hamilton	Brother	
Ireland	William Hamilton	Blayney Hamilton	Brother	
Ireland	William Hamilton	Willoughby Hamilton	Brother	
Ireland	Willoughby Hamilton	Blayney Hamilton	Brother	
Ireland	Willoughby Hamilton	William Hamilton	Brother	
Ireland	Beatrice Langrishe	May Langrishe	Sister	
Ireland	May Langrishe	Beatrice Langrishe	Sister	
Ireland	Kevin Sorensen	Louk Sorensen	Brother	
Ireland	Kevin Sorensen	Sean Sorensen	Father	
Ireland	Louk Sorensen	Kevin Sorensen	Brother	
Ireland	Louk Sorensen	Sean Sorensen	Father	
Ireland	Sean Sorensen	Kevin Sorensen	Son	
Ireland	Sean Sorensen	Louk Sorensen	Son	
Ireland	Frank Stoker	Norma Stoker	Daughter	
Ireland	Norma Stoker	Frank Stoker	Father	
Italy	Andrea Arnaboldi	Federico Arnaboldi	Cousin	
Italy	Federico Arnaboldi	Andrea Arnaboldi	Cousin	
Italy	Jacopo Berrettini	Matteo Berrettini	Brother	
Italy	Matteo Berrettini	Jacopo Berrettini	Brother	
Italy	Annalisa Bossi	Renato Bossi	Husband	
Italy	Renato Bossi	Annalisa Bossi	Wife	
Italy	Nuria Brancaccio	Raúl Brancaccio	Brother	
Italy	Raúl Brancaccio	Nuria Brancaccio	Sister	
Italy	Flavio Cobolli	Stefano Cobolli	Father	
Italy	Stefano Cobolli	Flavio Cobolli	Son	
Italy	Luciano Darderi	Vito Antonio Darderi	Brother	
Italy	Vito Antonio Darderi	Luciano Darderi	Brother	
Italy	Marcello del Bello	Rolando Del Bello	Brother	
Italy	Rolando Del Bello	Marcello del Bello	Brother	
Italy	Gaetano Di Maso	Monique Salfati	Wife	
Italy	Cristiana Ferrando	Linda Ferrando	Aunt	
Italy	Linda Ferrando	Cristiana Ferrando	Niece	
Italy	Fabio Fognini	Flavia Pennetta	Wife	
Italy	Andrea Gaudenzi	Stefano Gaudenzi	Uncle	
Italy	Stefano Gaudenzi	Andrea Gaudenzi	Nephew	
Italy	Claudia Giovine	Flavia Pennetta	Cousin	
Italy	Elia Grossi	Marzia Grossi	Sister	
Italy	Marzia Grossi	Elia Grossi	Brother	
Italy	Karin Knapp	Francesco Piccari	Husband	
Italy	Vittorio Magnelli	Sandrine Testud	Wife	
Italy	Pietro Marzano	Daniela Porzio	Wife	
Italy	Evelyn Mayr	Julia Mayr	Sister	
Italy	Julia Mayr	Evelyn Mayr	Sister	
Italy	Famiano Meneschincheri	Marco Meneschincheri	Brother	
Italy	Marco Meneschincheri	Famiano Meneschincheri	Brother	
Italy	Gianni Ocleppo	Julian Ocleppo	Son	
Italy	Julian Ocleppo	Gianni Ocleppo	Father	
Italy	Francesca Pace	Irina Spîrlea	Mother	
Italy	Adriano Panatta	Claudio Panatta	Brother	
Italy	Claudio Panatta	Adriano Panatta	Brother	
Italy	Flavia Pennetta	Fabio Fognini	Husband	
Italy	Flavia Pennetta	Claudia Giovine	Cousin	
Italy	Francesco Piccari	Karin Knapp	Wife	
Italy	Jessica Pieri	Tatiana Pieri	Sister	
Italy	Tatiana Pieri	Jessica Pieri	Sister	
Italy	Lisa Pigato	Ugo Pigato	Father	
Italy	Ugo Pigato	Lisa Pigato	Daughter	
Italy	Claudio Pistolesi	Anna Smashnova	Ex-wife	
Italy	Daniela Porzio	Pietro Marzano	Husband	
Italy	Francesco Ricci Bitti	Raimondo Ricci Bitti	Brother	
Italy	Raimondo Ricci Bitti	Francesco Ricci Bitti	Brother	
Italy	Lorenzo Sciahbasi	Matteo Sciahbasi	Brother	
Italy	Matteo Sciahbasi	Lorenzo Sciahbasi	Brother	
Italy	Adriana Serra Zanetti	Antonella Serra Zanetti	Sister	
Italy	Antonella Serra Zanetti	Adriana Serra Zanetti	Sister	
Italy	Martina Trevisan	Matteo Trevisan	Brother	
Italy	Matteo Trevisan	Martina Trevisan	Sister	
Italy	Andrea Vavassori	Matteo Vavassori	Brother	
Italy	Matteo Vavassori	Andrea Vavassori	Brother	
Latvia	Laura Gulbe	Ernests Gulbis	Half-brother	
Latvia	Ernests Gulbis	Laura Gulbe	Half-sister	
Latvia	Armand Strombach	Robert Strombachs	Son	
Latvia	Robert Strombachs	Armand Strombach	Father	
Moldova	Ion Bucșa	Cristina Bucșa	Daughter	
Monaco	Benjamin Balleret	Bernard Balleret	Father	
Monaco	Benjamin Balleret	Alexia Dechaume-Balleret	Stepmother	
Monaco	Benjamin Balleret	Chloé Paquet	Cousin	
Monaco	Benjamin Balleret	Valentin Vacherot	Half-brother	
Monaco	Bernard Balleret	Benjamin Balleret	Son	
Monaco	Bernard Balleret	Alexia Dechaume-Balleret	Wife	
Monaco	Hugo Nys	Francis Nys	Grandfather	
Monaco	Valentin Vacherot	Benjamin Balleret	Half-brother	
Monaco	Valentin Vacherot	Chloé Paquet	Cousin	
Monaco	Valentin Vacherot	Arthur Rinderknech	Cousin	
Montenegro	Igor Saveljić	Ivan Saveljić	Twin brother	
Montenegro	Ivan Saveljić	Igor Saveljić	Twin brother	
Netherlands	Scott Griekspoor	Tallon Griekspoor	Brother	
Netherlands	Tallon Griekspoor	Scott Griekspoor	Brother	
Netherlands	Arianne Hartono	Lukky Tedjamukti	Aunt	
Netherlands	Fred Hemmes Sr.	Fred Hemmes Jr.	Son	
Netherlands	Fred Hemmes Jr.	Fred Hemmes Sr.	Father	
Netherlands	Anouk Koevermans	Mark Koevermans	Father	
Netherlands	Mark Koevermans	Anouk Koevermans	Daughter	
Netherlands	Wesley Koolhof	Julia Görges	Wife	
Netherlands	Michaëlla Krajicek	Martin Emmrich	Ex-husband	
Netherlands	Michaëlla Krajicek	Austin Krajicek	Cousin	
Netherlands	Michaëlla Krajicek	Richard Krajicek	Half-brother	
Netherlands	Richard Krajicek	Austin Krajicek	Cousin	
Netherlands	Richard Krajicek	Michaëlla Krajicek	Half-sister	
Netherlands	Marielle Rooimans	Nicolette Rooimans	Twin sister	
Netherlands	Nicolette Rooimans	Marielle Rooimans	Twin sister	
Netherlands	John van Lottum	Julie Belgraver	Niece	
Netherlands	John van Lottum	Noëlle van Lottum	Sister	
Netherlands	Noëlle van Lottum	Julie Belgraver	Daughter	
Netherlands	Noëlle van Lottum	John van Lottum	Brother	
Norway	Johan Haanes	Sigurd Haanes	Brother	
Norway	Sigurd Haanes	Johan Haanes	Brother	
Norway	Casper Ruud	Christian Ruud	Father	
Norway	Christian Ruud	Casper Ruud	Son	
Poland	Dawid Celt	Agnieszka Radwańska	Wife	
Poland	Gina Feistel	Magdalena Feistel	Mother	
Poland	Magdalena Feistel	Gina Feistel	Daughter	
Poland	Hubert Hurkacz	Tomasz Maliszewski	Uncle	
Poland	Tomasz Maliszewski	Hubert Hurkacz	Nephew	
Poland	Agnieszka Radwańska	Dawid Celt	Husband	
Poland	Agnieszka Radwańska	Urszula Radwańska	Sister	
Poland	Urszula Radwańska	Agnieszka Radwańska	Sister	
Poland	Aleksandra Rosolska	Alicja Rosolska	Sister	
Poland	Alicja Rosolska	Aleksandra Rosolska	Sister	
Portugal	Felipe Cunha e Silva	João Cunha e Silva	Father	
Portugal	João Cunha e Silva	Felipe Cunha e Silva	Son	
Portugal	Francisca Jorge	Matilde Jorge	Sister	
Portugal	Matilde Jorge	Francisca Jorge	Sister	
Portugal	Francisco Rocha	Henrique Rocha	Brother	
Portugal	Henrique Rocha	Francisco Rocha	Brother	
Portugal	João Dinis Silva	Tiago Silva	Brother	
Portugal	Tiago Silva	João Dinis Silva	Brother	
Romania	Alexandra Cadanțu-Ignatik	Uladzimir Ignatik	Husband	
Romania	Ionuț Moldovan	Mihaela Moldovan	Sister	
Romania	Mihaela Moldovan	Ionuț Moldovan	Brother	
Romania	Ilie Năstase	Mihnea-Ion Năstase	Nephew	
Romania	Mihnea-Ion Năstase	Ilie Năstase	Uncle	
Romania	Gabriela Niculescu	Monica Niculescu	Sister	
Romania	Monica Niculescu	Gabriela Niculescu	Sister	
Romania	Mariana Simionescu	Björn Borg	Ex-husband	
Romania	Irina Spîrlea	Francesca Pace	Daughter	
Romania	Adrian Ungur	Liana Ungur	Wife	
Romania	Liana Ungur	Adrian Ungur	Husband	
Russia	Erika Andreeva	Mirra Andreeva	Sister	
Russia	Mirra Andreeva	Erika Andreeva	Sister	
Russia	Margarita Betova	Sergey Betov	Husband	
Russia	Nikolay Davydenko	Philipp Davydenko	Nephew	
Russia	Philipp Davydenko	Nikolay Davydenko	Uncle	
Russia	Sergei Demekhine	Veronika Kudermetova	Wife	
Russia	Artem Derepasko	Timofei Derepasko	Son	
Russia	Timofei Derepasko	Artem Derepasko	Father	
Russia	Julia Efremova	Ksenia Efremova	Daughter	
Russia	Rauza Islanova	Dinara Safina	Daughter	
Russia	Rauza Islanova	Marat Safin	Son	
Russia	Anna Kournikova	Evgeny Korolev	Cousin	
Russia	Polina Kudermetova	Veronika Kudermetova	Sister	
Russia	Veronika Kudermetova	Sergei Demekhine	Husband	
Russia	Veronika Kudermetova	Polina Kudermetova	Sister	
Russia	Anna Arina Marenko	Andrey Rublev	Half-brother	
Russia	Andrei Mishin	Daria Mishina	Wife	
Russia	Daria Mishina	Andrei Mishin	Husband	
Russia	Alexandra Panova	Olga Panova	Sister	
Russia	Olga Panova	Alexandra Panova	Sister	
Russia	Alexander Pavlioutchenkov	Anastasia Pavlyuchenkova	Sister	
Russia	Anastasia Pavlyuchenkova	Alexander Pavlioutchenkov	Brother	
Russia	Anastasia Potapova	Alexander Shevchenko	Husband	
Russia	Andrey Rublev	Anna Arina Marenko	Half-sister	
Russia	Marat Safin	Rauza Islanova	Mother	
Russia	Marat Safin	Dinara Safina	Sister	
Russia	Dinara Safina	Rauza Islanova	Mother	
Russia	Dinara Safina	Marat Safin	Brother	
Russia	Julia Salnikova	Apostolos Tsitsipas	Husband	
Russia	Julia Salnikova	Petros Tsitsipas	Son	
Russia	Julia Salnikova	Stefanos Tsitsipas	Son	
Russia	Dmitri Sitak	Artem Sitak	Brother	
Russia	Alexander Zverev Sr.	Alexander Zverev	Son	
Russia	Alexander Zverev Sr.	Irina Zvereva	Wife	
Russia	Alexander Zverev Sr.	Mischa Zverev	Son	
Russia	Irina Zvereva	Alexander Zverev	Son	
Russia	Irina Zvereva	Alexander Zverev Sr.	Husband	
Russia	Irina Zvereva	Mischa Zverev	Son	
Serbia	Djordje Djokovic	Marko Djokovic	Brother	
Serbia	Djordje Djokovic	Novak Djokovic	Brother	
Serbia	Marko Djokovic	Djordje Djokovic	Brother	
Serbia	Marko Djokovic	Novak Djokovic	Brother	
Serbia	Novak Djokovic	Djordje Djokovic	Brother	
Serbia	Novak Djokovic	Marko Djokovic	Brother	
Serbia	David Savić	Dragan Savić	Father	
Serbia	Dragan Savić	David Savić	Son	
Slovakia	Kristína Kučová	Zuzana Kučová	Sister	
Slovakia	Zuzana Kučová	Kristína Kučová	Sister	
Slovakia	Miloslav Mečíř	Miloslav Mečíř Jr.	Son	
Slovakia	Miloslav Mečíř Jr.	Miloslav Mečíř	Father	
Slovakia	Anna Karolína Schmiedlová	Kristína Schmiedlová	Sister	
Slovakia	Kristína Schmiedlová	Anna Karolína Schmiedlová	Sister	
Slovenia	Aljaž Bedene	Andraž Bedene	Twin brother	
Slovenia	Andraž Bedene	Aljaž Bedene	Twin brother	
Slovenia	Luka Gregorc	Miha Gregorc	Brother	
Slovenia	Miha Gregorc	Luka Gregorc	Brother	
Slovenia	Maša Vesenjak	Urška Vesenjak	Twin sister	
Slovenia	Urška Vesenjak	Maša Vesenjak	Twin sister	
Spain	Alberto Arilla	José Luis Arilla	Brother	
Spain	José Luis Arilla	Alberto Arilla	Brother	
Spain	Cristina Bucșa	Ion Bucșa	Father	
Spain	Jorge Gisbert	José María Gisbert	Brother	
Spain	Jorge Gisbert	Juan Gisbert Sr.	Brother	
Spain	Jorge Gisbert	Juan Gisbert Schultze	Nephew	
Spain	José María Gisbert	Jorge Gisbert	Brother	
Spain	José María Gisbert	Juan Gisbert Sr.	Brother	
Spain	José María Gisbert	Juan Gisbert Schultze	Nephew	
Spain	Juan Gisbert Sr.	Jorge Gisbert	Brother	
Spain	Juan Gisbert Sr.	José María Gisbert	Brother	
Spain	Juan Gisbert Sr.	Juan Gisbert Schultze	Son	
Spain	Juan Gisbert Schultze	Jorge Gisbert	Uncle	
Spain	Juan Gisbert Schultze	José María Gisbert	Uncle	
Spain	Juan Gisbert Schultze	Juan Gisbert Sr.	Father	
Spain	Juan Gisbert Schultze	Helga Schultze	Aunt	
Spain	Valentín González-Galiño	Alicia Ortuño	Mother	
Spain	Gerard Granollers	Marcel Granollers	Brother	
Spain	Marcel Granollers	Gerard Granollers	Brother	
Spain	Álex López Morón	Víctor López Morón	Brother	
Spain	Víctor López Morón	Álex López Morón	Brother	
Spain	Carmen Mandarino	José Edison Mandarino	Husband	
Spain	Albert Montañés	Francesc Montañés	Brother	
Spain	Francesc Montañés	Albert Montañés	Brother	
Spain	Rafael Nadal	Toni Nadal	Uncle	
Spain	Toni Nadal	Rafael Nadal	Nephew	
Spain	Alicia Ortuño	Valentín González-Galiño	Son	
Spain	María José Sánchez Alayeto	María Pilar Sánchez Alayeto	Twin sister	
Spain	María Pilar Sánchez Alayeto	María José Sánchez Alayeto	Twin sister	
Spain	Arantxa Sánchez Vicario	Emilio Sánchez	Brother	
Spain	Arantxa Sánchez Vicario	Javier Sánchez	Brother	
Spain	Emilio Sánchez	Arantxa Sánchez Vicario	Sister	
Spain	Emilio Sánchez	Javier Sánchez	Brother	
Spain	Javier Sánchez	Arantxa Sánchez Vicario	Sister	
Spain	Javier Sánchez	Emilio Sánchez	Brother	
Spain	Janet Souto	Ninoska Souto	Sister	
Spain	Ninoska Souto	Janet Souto	Sister	
Spain	Gabriela Velasco Andreu	Jairo Velasco Jr.	Brother	
Spain	Gabriela Velasco Andreu	Jairo Velasco Sr.	Father	
Spain	Jairo Velasco Jr.	Gabriela Velasco Andreu	Sister	
Spain	Jairo Velasco Jr.	Jairo Velasco Sr.	Father	
Sweden	Mirjam Björklund	Denis Shapovalov	Husband	
Sweden	Björn Borg	Leo Borg	Son	
Sweden	Björn Borg	Mariana Simionescu	Ex-wife	
Sweden	Leo Borg	Björn Borg	Father	
Sweden	André Göransson	Tim Göransson	Brother	
Sweden	Tim Göransson	André Göransson	Brother	
Sweden	Anders Henricsson	Per Henricsson	Brother	
Sweden	Per Henricsson	Anders Henricsson	Brother	
Sweden	Christer Holm	Henrik Holm	Son	
Sweden	Christer Holm	Nils Holm	Son	
Sweden	Henrik Holm	Christer Holm	Father	
Sweden	Henrik Holm	Nils Holm	Brother	
Sweden	Nils Holm	Christer Holm	Father	
Sweden	Nils Holm	Henrik Holm	Brother	
Sweden	Joachim Johansson	Leif Johansson	Father	
Sweden	Leif Johansson	Joachim Johansson	Son	
Sweden	William Rejchtman Vinciguerra	Andreas Vinciguerra	Uncle	
Sweden	Nadja Roma	Sandra Roma	Sister	
Sweden	Sandra Roma	Nadja Roma	Sister	
Sweden	Hans Simonsson	Stefan Simonsson	Brother	
Sweden	Stefan Simonsson	Hans Simonsson	Brother	
Sweden	Andreas Vinciguerra	William Rejchtman Vinciguerra	Nephew	
Sweden	Elias Ymer	Mikael Ymer	Brother	
Sweden	Mikael Ymer	Elias Ymer	Brother	
Switzerland	Charles Aeschlimann	Leslie Bancroft	Wife	
Switzerland	Daniela Casanova	Myriam Casanova	Sister	
Switzerland	Myriam Casanova	Daniela Casanova	Sister	
Switzerland	Cathy Caverzasio	Kilian Feldbausch	Son	
Switzerland	Céline Cohen	Tore Meinecke	Husband	
Switzerland	Sandro Della Piana	Henri Laaksonen	Son	
Switzerland	Lilian Drescher	Nicolas Kelaidis	Husband	
Switzerland	Mirka Federer	Roger Federer	Husband	
Switzerland	Roger Federer	Mirka Federer	Wife	
Switzerland	Kilian Feldbausch	Cathy Caverzasio	Mother	
Switzerland	Heinz Günthardt	Markus Günthardt	Brother	
Switzerland	Markus Günthardt	Heinz Günthardt	Brother	
Switzerland	Henri Laaksonen	Sandro Della Piana	Father	
Switzerland	Joana Manta	Leonardo Manta	Father	
Switzerland	Joana Manta	Lorenzo Manta	Brother	
Switzerland	Leonardo Manta	Joana Manta	Daughter	
Switzerland	Leonardo Manta	Lorenzo Manta	Son	
Switzerland	Lorenzo Manta	Joana Manta	Sister	
Switzerland	Lorenzo Manta	Leonardo Manta	Father	
Switzerland	Claudio Mezzadri	Stefano Mezzadri	Brother	
Switzerland	Stefano Mezzadri	Claudio Mezzadri	Brother	
Switzerland	Sarah Moundir	Adam Moundir	Brother	
Ukraine	Talina Beiko	Marta Kostyuk	Daughter	
Ukraine	Alona Bondarenko	Kateryna Bondarenko	Sister	
Ukraine	Alona Bondarenko	Valeria Bondarenko	Sister	
Ukraine	Kateryna Bondarenko	Alona Bondarenko	Sister	
Ukraine	Kateryna Bondarenko	Valeria Bondarenko	Sister	
Ukraine	Valeria Bondarenko	Alona Bondarenko	Sister	
Ukraine	Valeria Bondarenko	Kateryna Bondarenko	Sister	
Ukraine	Alexandr Dolgopolov	Oleksandr Dolgopolov Sr.	Father	
Ukraine	Oleksandr Dolgopolov Sr.	Alexandr Dolgopolov	Son	
Ukraine	Elizaveta Ianchuk	Olga Ianchuk	Sister	
Ukraine	Olga Ianchuk	Elizaveta Ianchuk	Sister	
Ukraine	Lyudmyla Kichenok	Nadiia Kichenok	Twin sister	
Ukraine	Nadiia Kichenok	Lyudmyla Kichenok	Twin sister	
Ukraine	Marta Kostyuk	Talina Beiko	Mother	
Ukraine	Andrei Medvedev	Natalia Medvedeva	Sister	
Ukraine	Natalia Medvedeva	Andrei Medvedev	Brother	
Ukraine	Tessa Shapovalova	Denis Shapovalov	Son	
Ukraine	Elina Svitolina	Gaël Monfils	Husband	
Ukraine	Dayana Yastremska	Ivanna Yastremska	Sister	
Ukraine	Ivanna Yastremska	Dayana Yastremska	Sister	
United Kingdom	Charles Gladstone Allen	Roy Allen	Twin brother	
United Kingdom	Roy Allen	Charles Gladstone Allen	Twin brother	
United Kingdom	Bunny Austin	Joan Austin	Sister	
United Kingdom	Edith Austin	George Greville	Husband	
United Kingdom	Joan Austin	Bunny Austin	Brother	
United Kingdom	Joan Austin	Randolph Lycett	Husband	
United Kingdom	Herbert Baddeley	Wilfred Baddeley	Twin brother	
United Kingdom	Wilfred Baddeley	Herbert Baddeley	Twin brother	
United Kingdom	Richard Barker	William Barker	Twin brother	
United Kingdom	William Barker	Richard Barker	Twin brother	
United Kingdom	Alfred Beamish	Geraldine Beamish	Wife	
United Kingdom	Geraldine Beamish	Alfred Beamish	Husband	
United Kingdom	Henry Billington	Tim Henman	Grandson	
United Kingdom	John Boucher	Edith Hannam	Sister	
United Kingdom	Katie Boulter	Alex de Minaur	Husband	
United Kingdom	Herbert Bowes-Lyon	Patrick Bowes-Lyon	Brother	
United Kingdom	Patrick Bowes-Lyon	Herbert Bowes-Lyon	Brother	
United Kingdom	Kate Brasher	Shirley Brasher	Mother	
United Kingdom	Shirley Brasher	Kate Brasher	Daughter	
United Kingdom	Liam Broady	Naomi Broady	Sister	
United Kingdom	Naomi Broady	Liam Broady	Brother	
United Kingdom	Charlotte Cooper	Gwen Sterry	Daughter	
United Kingdom	Lorna Cornell	Peter Cawthorn	Ex-husband	
United Kingdom	Ernest Crawley	Walter Crawley	Brother	
United Kingdom	Walter Crawley	Ernest Crawley	Brother	
United Kingdom	Peter Curtis	Mary-Ann Eisel	Wife	
United Kingdom	Mike Davies	Ilse Buding	Wife	
United Kingdom	Laurence Doherty	Reginald Doherty	Brother	
United Kingdom	Reginald Doherty	Laurence Doherty	Brother	
United Kingdom	Jack Draper	Roger Draper	Father	
United Kingdom	Roger Draper	Jack Draper	Son	
United Kingdom	Jaroslav Drobný	Rita Jarvis	Wife	
United Kingdom	Arthur Fery	Olivia Féry	Mother	
United Kingdom	Leslie Godfree	Kathleen McKane Godfree	Wife	
United Kingdom	George Greville	Edith Austin	Wife	
United Kingdom	Kaye Hand	Paul Hand	Brother	
United Kingdom	Paul Hand	Kaye Hand	Sister	
United Kingdom	Edith Hannam	John Boucher	Brother	
United Kingdom	Derek Hardwick	Mary Hardwick	Sister	
United Kingdom	Mary Hardwick	Derek Hardwick	Brother	
United Kingdom	Mary Hardwick	Charles Hare	Husband	
United Kingdom	Charles Hare	Mary Hardwick	Wife	
United Kingdom	Tim Henman	Henry Billington	Grandfather	
United Kingdom	Tim Henman	Ellen Mary Stawell-Brown	Great-grandmother	
United Kingdom	Paul Hutchins	Ross Hutchins	Son	
United Kingdom	Ross Hutchins	Paul Hutchins	Father	
United Kingdom	Andrew Jarrett	Debbie Jevans	Ex-wife	
United Kingdom	Rita Jarvis	Owen Anderson	Ex-husband	
United Kingdom	Rita Jarvis	Jaroslav Drobný	Husband	
United Kingdom	Debbie Jevans	Andrew Jarrett	Ex-husband	
United Kingdom	Amanda Keen	Christine Truman	Mother	
United Kingdom	Amanda Keen	Humphrey Truman	Uncle	
United Kingdom	Amanda Keen	Nell Truman	Aunt	
United Kingdom	Claude Lister	Thelma Lister	Wife	
United Kingdom	Thelma Lister	Claude Lister	Husband	
United Kingdom	David Lloyd	John Lloyd	Brother	
United Kingdom	David Lloyd	Tony Lloyd	Brother	
United Kingdom	John Lloyd	Chris Evert	Ex-wife	
United Kingdom	John Lloyd	David Lloyd	Brother	
United Kingdom	John Lloyd	Tony Lloyd	Brother	
United Kingdom	Tony Lloyd	David Lloyd	Brother	
United Kingdom	Tony Lloyd	John Lloyd	Brother	
United Kingdom	Arthur Lowe	Gordon Lowe	Brother	
United Kingdom	Gordon Lowe	Arthur Lowe	Brother	
United Kingdom	Randolph Lycett	Joan Austin	Wife	
United Kingdom	Leonard Lyle	Nancy Lyle	Daughter	
United Kingdom	Nancy Lyle	Leonard Lyle	Father	
United Kingdom	Frances MacLennan	Roger Taylor	Ex-husband	
United Kingdom	Ross Matheson	Carole Rosser	Mother	
United Kingdom	Kathleen McKane Godfree	Leslie Godfree	Husband	
United Kingdom	Kathleen McKane Godfree	Margaret McKane Stocks	Sister	
United Kingdom	Margaret McKane Stocks	Kathleen McKane Godfree	Sister	
United Kingdom	Roderick McNair	Winifred McNair	Wife	
United Kingdom	Winifred McNair	Roderick McNair	Husband	
United Kingdom	Alan Mills	Jill Rook	Wife	
United Kingdom	Francis William Monement	William Bolding Monement	Brother	
United Kingdom	William Bolding Monement	Francis William Monement	Brother	
United Kingdom	Tara Moore	Emina Bektas	Wife	
United Kingdom	Buster Mottram	Joy Mottram	Mother	
United Kingdom	Buster Mottram	Linda Mottram	Sister	
United Kingdom	Buster Mottram	Tony Mottram	Father	
United Kingdom	Buster Mottram	Pearl Panton	Aunt	
United Kingdom	Joy Mottram	Buster Mottram	Son	
United Kingdom	Joy Mottram	Linda Mottram	Daughter	
United Kingdom	Joy Mottram	Tony Mottram	Husband	
United Kingdom	Joy Mottram	Pearl Panton	Sister	
United Kingdom	Linda Mottram	Buster Mottram	Brother	
United Kingdom	Linda Mottram	Joy Mottram	Mother	
United Kingdom	Linda Mottram	Tony Mottram	Father	
United Kingdom	Linda Mottram	Pearl Panton	Aunt	
United Kingdom	Tony Mottram	Buster Mottram	Son	
United Kingdom	Tony Mottram	Joy Mottram	Wife	
United Kingdom	Tony Mottram	Linda Mottram	Daughter	
United Kingdom	Andy Murray	Jamie Murray	Brother	
United Kingdom	Andy Murray	Judy Murray	Mother	
United Kingdom	Jamie Murray	Andy Murray	Brother	
United Kingdom	Jamie Murray	Judy Murray	Mother	
United Kingdom	Judy Murray	Andy Murray	Son	
United Kingdom	Judy Murray	Jamie Murray	Son	
United Kingdom	Samantha Murray Sharan	Divij Sharan	Husband	
United Kingdom	Geoffrey Owen	Violet Owen	Mother	
United Kingdom	Violet Owen	Geoffrey Owen	Son	
United Kingdom	Pearl Panton	Buster Mottram	Nephew	
United Kingdom	Pearl Panton	Linda Mottram	Niece	
United Kingdom	Pearl Panton	Joy Mottram	Sister	
United Kingdom	Susan Partridge	Philippe Chatrier	Ex-husband	
United Kingdom	Ernest Renshaw	William Renshaw	Twin brother	
United Kingdom	William Renshaw	Ernest Renshaw	Twin brother	
United Kingdom	Jill Rook	Alan Mills	Husband	
United Kingdom	Carole Rosser	Ross Matheson	Son	
United Kingdom	Ken Skupski	Neal Skupski	Brother	
United Kingdom	Neal Skupski	Ken Skupski	Brother	
United Kingdom	Ellen Mary Stawell-Brown	Tim Henman	Great-grandson	
United Kingdom	Bertha Steedman	Mary Steedman	Sister	
United Kingdom	Mary Steedman	Bertha Steedman	Sister	
United Kingdom	Gwen Sterry	Charlotte Cooper	Mother	
United Kingdom	Roger Taylor	Frances MacLennan	Ex-wife	
United Kingdom	Christine Truman	Amanda Keen	Daughter	
United Kingdom	Christine Truman	Humphrey Truman	Brother	
United Kingdom	Christine Truman	Nell Truman	Sister	
United Kingdom	Humphrey Truman	Amanda Keen	Niece	
United Kingdom	Humphrey Truman	Christine Truman	Sister	
United Kingdom	Humphrey Truman	Nell Truman	Sister	
United Kingdom	Nell Truman	Amanda Keen	Niece	
United Kingdom	Nell Truman	Christine Truman	Sister	
United Kingdom	Nell Truman	Humphrey Truman	Brother	
United Kingdom	Agnes Tuckey	Kay Tuckey	Daughter	
United Kingdom	Agnes Tuckey	Raymond Tuckey	Son	
United Kingdom	Kay Tuckey	Agnes Tuckey	Mother	
United Kingdom	Kay Tuckey	Raymond Tuckey	Brother	
United Kingdom	Raymond Tuckey	Agnes Tuckey	Mother	
United Kingdom	Raymond Tuckey	Kay Tuckey	Sister	
United Kingdom	Lilian Watson	Maud Watson	Sister	
United Kingdom	Maud Watson	Lilian Watson	Sister	
United Kingdom	Gerald Williams	Joyce Williams	Ex-wife	
United Kingdom	Joyce Williams	Gerald Williams	Ex-husband	
United Kingdom	Dale Womersley	Nalton Womersley	Brother	
United Kingdom	Nalton Womersley	Dale Womersley	Brother	

== North America ==
Country of origin	Person 1	Person 2	Relationship	Ref.
Canada	Félix Auger-Aliassime	Malika Auger-Aliassime	Sister	
Canada	Malika Auger-Aliassime	Félix Auger-Aliassime	Brother	
Canada	Carling Bassett-Seguso	John F. Bassett	Father	
Canada	Carling Bassett-Seguso	Robert Seguso	Husband	
Canada	John F. Bassett	Carling Bassett-Seguso	Daughter	
Canada	Keith Carpenter	Michael Carpenter	Brother	
Canada	Michael Carpenter	Keith Carpenter	Brother	
Canada	Bianca Fernandez	Jorge Fernandez	Father	
Canada	Bianca Fernandez	Leylah Fernandez	Sister	
Canada	Jorge Fernandez	Bianca Fernandez	Daughter	
Canada	Jorge Fernandez	Leylah Fernandez	Daughter	
Canada	Leylah Fernandez	Bianca Fernandez	Sister	
Canada	Leylah Fernandez	Jorge Fernandez	Father	
Canada	Harry Fritz	Taylor Fritz	Nephew	
Canada	Brendan Macken	Jim Macken	Brother	
Canada	Jim Macken	Brendan Macken	Brother	
Canada	Nick Mohtadi	Matthew Farhang Mohtadi	Father	
Canada	Jana Nejedly	Martina Nejedly	Sister	
Canada	Martina Nejedly	Jana Nejedly	Sister	
Canada	Brenda Nunns	Gilbert Nunns	Father	
Canada	Gilbert Nunns	Brenda Nunns	Daughter	
Canada	Denis Shapovalov	Mirjam Björklund	Wife	
Canada	Denis Shapovalov	Tessa Shapovalova	Mother	
Costa Rica	Fred Thome	Kenneth Thome	Brother	
Costa Rica	Kenneth Thome	Fred Thome	Brother	
Cuba	Orlando Garrido	Reynaldo Garrido	Brother	
Cuba	Reynaldo Garrido	Orlando Garrido	Brother	
El Salvador	Marcelo Arévalo	Rafael Arévalo	Brother	
El Salvador	Rafael Arévalo	Marcelo Arévalo	Brother	
Guatemala	Carlos Chávez	Daniel Chávez	Brother	
Guatemala	Carlos Chávez	Jacobo Chávez	Brother	
Guatemala	Daniel Chávez	Carlos Chávez	Brother	
Guatemala	Daniel Chávez	Jacobo Chávez	Brother	
Guatemala	Jacobo Chávez	Carlos Chávez	Brother	
Guatemala	Jacobo Chávez	Daniel Chávez	Brother	
Guatemala	Daniela Schippers	Paulina Schippers	Sister	
Guatemala	Paulina Schippers	Daniela Schippers	Sister	
Jamaica	Compton Russell	Richard Russell	Cousin	
Jamaica	Richard Russell	Compton Russell	Cousin	
Jamaica	Richard Russell	Ryan Russell	Son	
Jamaica	Ryan Russell	Richard Russell	Father	
Mexico	Fernanda Contreras Gómez	Francisco Contreras	Grandfather	
Mexico	Fernanda Contreras Gómez	Javier Contreras	Father	
Mexico	Fernanda Contreras Gómez	Raúl Contreras	Great-uncle	
Mexico	Francisco Contreras	Fernanda Contreras Gómez	Granddaughter	
Mexico	Francisco Contreras	Raúl Contreras	Brother	
Mexico	Francisco Contreras	Javier Contreras	Son	
Mexico	Javier Contreras	Fernanda Contreras Gómez	Daughter	
Mexico	Javier Contreras	Francisco Contreras	Father	
Mexico	Javier Contreras	Raúl Contreras	Uncle	
Mexico	Raúl Contreras	Fernanda Contreras Gómez	Great-niece	
Mexico	Raúl Contreras	Francisco Contreras	Brother	
Mexico	Raúl Contreras	Javier Contreras	Nephew	
Mexico	Ernesto Escobedo	Xóchitl Escobedo	Aunt	
Mexico	Ernesto Escobedo	Eduardo Nava	Cousin	
Mexico	Ernesto Escobedo	Emilio Nava	Cousin	
Mexico	Xóchitl Escobedo	Ernesto Escobedo	Nephew	
Mexico	Xóchitl Escobedo	Eduardo Nava	Son	
Mexico	Xóchitl Escobedo	Emilio Nava	Son	
Mexico	Alfonso González	Kathleen Schuurmans	Wife	
Mexico	Claudia Hernández	Juan Hernández	Brother	
Mexico	Juan Hernández	Claudia Hernández	Sister	
Mexico	Maluca Llamas	Mario Llamas	Father	
Mexico	Mario Llamas	Maluca Llamas	Daughter	
Mexico	Emilio Montaño	Olga Montaño	Sister	
Mexico	Emilio Montaño	Patricia Montaño	Sister	
Mexico	Olga Montaño	Emilio Montaño	Brother	
Mexico	Olga Montaño	Patricia Montaño	Sister	
Mexico	Patricia Montaño	Emilio Montaño	Brother	
Mexico	Patricia Montaño	Olga Montaño	Sister	
Mexico	Eduardo Nava	Ernesto Escobedo	Cousin	
Mexico	Eduardo Nava	Xóchitl Escobedo	Mother	
Mexico	Eduardo Nava	Emilio Nava	Brother	
Mexico	Emilio Nava	Ernesto Escobedo	Cousin	
Mexico	Emilio Nava	Xóchitl Escobedo	Mother	
Mexico	Emilio Nava	Eduardo Nava	Brother	
Mexico	Antonio Palafox	Gustavo Palafox	Cousin	
Mexico	Gustavo Palafox	Antonio Palafox	Cousin	
Mexico	Melita Ramírez	Yola Ramírez	Sister	
Mexico	Yola Ramírez	Melita Ramírez	Sister	
Mexico	Esteban Reyes	Esteban Reyes Jr.	Son	
Mexico	Esteban Reyes	Rosie Reyes	Daughter	
Mexico	Esteban Reyes Jr.	Esteban Reyes	Father	
Mexico	Esteban Reyes Jr.	Rosie Reyes	Sister	
Mexico	Rosie Reyes	Pierre Darmon	Husband	
Mexico	Rosie Reyes	Esteban Reyes	Father	
Mexico	Rosie Reyes	Esteban Reyes Jr.	Brother	
Mexico	Elena Subirats	Jaime Subirats	Brother	
Mexico	Jaime Subirats	Elena Subirats	Sister	
Mexico	Renata Zarazúa	Vicente Zarazúa	Great-uncle	
Mexico	Vicente Zarazúa	Renata Zarazúa	Great-niece	
Panama	José Gilbert Gómez	Luis Gómez	Brother	
Panama	Luis Gómez	José Gilbert Gómez	Brother	
Puerto Rico	Andy Brandi	Kristina Brandi	Niece	
Puerto Rico	Kristina Brandi	Andy Brandi	Uncle	
United States	Chuck Adams	Ashley Harkleroad	Wife	
United States	Andre Agassi	Steffi Graf	Wife	
United States	Owen Anderson	Rita Jarvis	Ex-wife	
United States	Mimi Arnold	Ethel Burkhardt Arnold	Mother	
United States	Juliette Atkinson	Kathleen Atkinson	Sister	
United States	Kathleen Atkinson	Juliette Atkinson	Sister	
United States	Jeff Austin	John Austin	Brother	
United States	Jeff Austin	Pam Austin	Sister	
United States	Jeff Austin	Tracy Austin	Sister	
United States	Jeff Austin	Brandon Holt	Nephew	
United States	John Austin	Jeff Austin	Brother	
United States	John Austin	Pam Austin	Sister	
United States	John Austin	Tracy Austin	Sister	
United States	John Austin	Brandon Holt	Nephew	
United States	Pam Austin	Jeff Austin	Brother	
United States	Pam Austin	John Austin	Brother	
United States	Pam Austin	Tracy Austin	Sister	
United States	Pam Austin	Brandon Holt	Nephew	
United States	Tracy Austin	Jeff Austin	Brother	
United States	Tracy Austin	John Austin	Brother	
United States	Tracy Austin	Pam Austin	Sister	
United States	Tracy Austin	Brandon Holt	Son	
United States	Leslie Bancroft	Charles Aeschlimann	Husband	
United States	Lindsay Bartlett	Shelly Bartlett	Sister	
United States	Shelly Bartlett	Lindsay Bartlett	Sister	
United States	Brian Battistone	Dann Battistone	Brother	
United States	Dann Battistone	Brian Battistone	Brother	
United States	Allen Behr	Karl Behr	Cousin	
United States	Karl Behr	Allen Behr	Cousin	
United States	Emina Bektas	Tara Moore	Wife	
United States	Andrea Berger	Jay Berger	Brother	
United States	Jay Berger	Andrea Berger	Sister	
United States	Hurricane Tyra Black	Tornado Alicia Black	Sister	
United States	Tornado Alicia Black	Hurricane Tyra Black	Sister	
United States	James Blake	Thomas Blake	Brother	
United States	Kathy Blake	Bob Bryan	Son	
United States	Kathy Blake	Mike Bryan	Son	
United States	Kathy Blake	Wayne Bryan	Husband	
United States	Thomas Blake	James Blake	Brother	
United States	Darwin Blanch	Ulises Blanch	Brother	
United States	Ulises Blanch	Darwin Blanch	Brother	
United States	Alex Bogomolov Jr.	Ashley Harkleroad	Ex-wife	
United States	Craig Boynton	Teri Whitlinger	Wife	
United States	Allison Bradshaw	Valerie Ziegenfuss	Mother	
United States	Jimmy Brown	Mike Brown	Brother	
United States	Jimmy Brown	Ricky Brown	Brother	
United States	Mike Brown	Jimmy Brown	Brother	
United States	Mike Brown	Ricky Brown	Brother	
United States	Ricky Brown	Jimmy Brown	Brother	
United States	Ricky Brown	Mike Brown	Brother	
United States	Bob Bryan	Kathy Blake	Mother	
United States	Bob Bryan	Mike Bryan	Twin brother	
United States	Bob Bryan	Wayne Bryan	Father	
United States	Mike Bryan	Kathy Blake	Mother	
United States	Mike Bryan	Bob Bryan	Twin brother	
United States	Mike Bryan	Wayne Bryan	Father	
United States	Wayne Bryan	Kathy Blake	Wife	
United States	Wayne Bryan	Bob Bryan	Son	
United States	Wayne Bryan	Mike Bryan	Son	
United States	Butch Buchholz	Cliff Buchholz	Brother	
United States	Cliff Buchholz	Butch Buchholz	Brother	
United States	Tom Bundy	Dorothy Cheney	Daughter	
United States	Tom Bundy	May Sutton	Ex-wife	
United States	Erin Burdette	Lindsay Burdette	Sister	
United States	Erin Burdette	Mallory Burdette	Sister	
United States	Lindsay Burdette	Erin Burdette	Sister	
United States	Lindsay Burdette	Mallory Burdette	Sister	
United States	Mallory Burdette	Erin Burdette	Sister	
United States	Mallory Burdette	Lindsay Burdette	Sister	
United States	Ethel Burkhardt Arnold	Mimi Arnold	Daughter	
United States	Jennifer Capriati	Steven Capriati	Brother	
United States	Steven Capriati	Jennifer Capriati	Sister	
United States	Denise Carter	Nick Carter	Father	
United States	Nick Carter	Denise Carter	Daughter	
United States	Carl Chang	Michael Chang	Brother	
United States	Michael Chang	Carl Chang	Brother	
United States	Michael Chang	Amber Liu	Wife	
United States	Alfred Chapin	Charlotte Hosmer Chapin	Wife	
United States	Charles A. Chase	Samuel T. Chase	Brother	
United States	Samuel T. Chase	Charles A. Chase	Brother	
United States	Dorothy Cheney	Tom Bundy	Father	
United States	Dorothy Cheney	John Doeg	Cousin	
United States	Dorothy Cheney	Ethel Sutton Bruce	Aunt	
United States	Dorothy Cheney	Florence Sutton	Aunt	
United States	Dorothy Cheney	May Sutton	Mother	
United States	Clarence Clark	Joseph Sill Clark Sr.	Brother	
United States	Joseph Sill Clark Sr.	Clarence Clark	Brother	
United States	Josh Cohen	Julia Cohen	Sister	
United States	Julia Cohen	Josh Cohen	Brother	
United States	Elwood Cooke	Sarah Palfrey Cooke	Wife	
United States	Carmen Corley	Ivana Corley	Sister	
United States	Ivana Corley	Carmen Corley	Sister	
United States	Bill Csipkay	Tom Csipkay	Brother	
United States	Tom Csipkay	Bill Csipkay	Brother	
United States	Martin Damm Jr.	Martin Damm	Father	
United States	Lindsay Davenport	Jagger Leach	Son	
United States	Lindsay Davenport	Jon Leach	Husband	
United States	Chris Delaney	James Delaney	Brother	
United States	James Delaney	Chris Delaney	Brother	
United States	Dick Dell	Donald Dell	Brother	
United States	Donald Dell	Dick Dell	Brother	
United States	Amy deLone	Erika deLone	Sister	
United States	Erika deLone	Amy deLone	Sister	
United States	Taylor Dent	Phil Dent	Father	
United States	Taylor Dent	Betty Ann Grubb Stuart	Mother	
United States	Taylor Dent	Brett Hansen-Dent	Stepbrother	
United States	Taylor Dent	Jennifer Hopkins	Wife	
United States	Diane Desfor	Curt Stalder	Husband	
United States	Diane Desfor	Reese Stalder	Son	
United States	John Doeg	Dorothy Cheney	Cousin	
United States	John Doeg	Ethel Sutton Bruce	Aunt	
United States	John Doeg	Florence Sutton	Aunt	
United States	John Doeg	May Sutton	Aunt	
United States	Caroline Dolehide	Courtney Dolehide	Sister	
United States	Courtney Dolehide	Caroline Dolehide	Sister	
United States	Mary-Ann Eisel	Peter Curtis	Husband	
United States	Chris Evert	Jeanne Evert	Sister	
United States	Chris Evert	Jimmy Evert	Father	
United States	Chris Evert	John Lloyd	Ex-husband	
United States	Jeanne Evert	Chris Evert	Sister	
United States	Jeanne Evert	Jimmy Evert	Father	
United States	Jimmy Evert	Chris Evert	Daughter	
United States	Jimmy Evert	Jeanne Evert	Daughter	
United States	Anna-Maria Fernandez	Cecilia Fernandez-Parker	Sister	
United States	Cecilia Fernandez-Parker	Anna-Maria Fernandez	Sister	
United States	Mary Joe Fernández	Nicholas Godsick	Son	
United States	Mike Fishbach	Peter Fishbach	Brother	
United States	Peter Fishbach	Mike Fishbach	Brother	
United States	Carrie Fleming	Laurie Rowley	Sister	
United States	Abigail Forbes	Matthew Forbes	Brother	
United States	Matthew Forbes	Abigail Forbes	Sister	
United States	Bruce Foxworth	Kathy Foxworth	Sister	
United States	Kathy Foxworth	Bruce Foxworth	Brother	
United States	Bjorn Fratangelo	Madison Keys	Wife	
United States	Taylor Fritz	Harry Fritz	Uncle	
United States	Taylor Fritz	Alysia May	Aunt	
United States	Taylor Fritz	Kathy May	Mother	
United States	Marjory Gengler	Stan Smith	Husband	
United States	Ruta Gerulaitis	Vitas Gerulaitis	Brother	
United States	Vitas Gerulaitis	Ruta Gerulaitis	Sister	
United States	Sam Giammalva	Sammy Giammalva Jr.	Son	
United States	Sam Giammalva	Tony Giammalva	Son	
United States	Sammy Giammalva Jr.	Sam Giammalva	Father	
United States	Sammy Giammalva Jr.	Tony Giammalva	Brother	
United States	Tony Giammalva	Sam Giammalva	Father	
United States	Tony Giammalva	Sammy Giammalva Jr.	Brother	
United States	Brad Gilbert	Dana Gilbert	Sister	
United States	Dana Gilbert	Brad Gilbert	Brother	
United States	Marjorie Gladman	John Van Ryn	Husband	
United States	Nicholas Godsick	Mary Joe Fernández	Mother	
United States	Brian Gottfried	Larry Gottfried	Brother	
United States	Larry Gottfried	Brian Gottfried	Brother	
United States	Carole Graebner	Clark Graebner	Ex-husband	
United States	Clark Graebner	Carole Graebner	Ex-wife	
United States	Betty Ann Grubb Stuart	Phil Dent	Husband	
United States	Betty Ann Grubb Stuart	Taylor Dent	Son	
United States	Betty Ann Grubb Stuart	Brett Hansen-Dent	Son	
United States	Betty Ann Grubb Stuart	Ken Stuart	Ex-husband	
United States	Carly Gullickson	Chelsey Gullickson	Sister	
United States	Chelsey Gullickson	Carly Gullickson	Sister	
United States	Tim Gullikson	Tom Gullikson	Twin brother	
United States	Tom Gullikson	Tim Gullikson	Twin brother	
United States	Keaton Hance	Kimmi Hance	Sister	
United States	Kimmi Hance	Keaton Hance	Brother	
United States	Brett Hansen-Dent	Phil Dent	Stepfather	
United States	Brett Hansen-Dent	Taylor Dent	Stepbrother	
United States	Brett Hansen-Dent	Betty Ann Grubb Stuart	Mother	
United States	Ashley Harkleroad	Chuck Adams	Husband	
United States	Ashley Harkleroad	Alex Bogomolov Jr.	Ex-husband	
United States	Charles Harris	William Harris	Son	
United States	William Harris	Charles Harris	Father	
United States	Christian Harrison	Ryan Harrison	Brother	
United States	Ryan Harrison	Christian Harrison	Brother	
United States	Gladys Heldman	Julie Heldman	Daughter	
United States	Gladys Heldman	Julius Heldman	Husband	
United States	Julie Heldman	Gladys Heldman	Mother	
United States	Julie Heldman	Julius Heldman	Father	
United States	Julius Heldman	Gladys Heldman	Wife	
United States	Julius Heldman	Julie Heldman	Daughter	
United States	Brandon Holt	Jeff Austin	Uncle	
United States	Brandon Holt	John Austin	Uncle	
United States	Brandon Holt	Pam Austin	Aunt	
United States	Brandon Holt	Tracy Austin	Mother	
United States	Jennifer Hopkins	Taylor Dent	Husband	
United States	Charlotte Hosmer Chapin	Alfred Chapin	Husband	
United States	Allyson Ingram	Butch Walts	Husband	
United States	Andrea Jaeger	Susie Jaeger	Sister	
United States	Susie Jaeger	Andrea Jaeger	Sister	
United States	Capucine Jauffret	François Jauffret	Grandfather	
United States	Capucine Jauffret	Jean-Paul Jauffret	Great-uncle	
United States	Jarmere Jenkins	Jermaine Jenkins	Brother	
United States	Jermaine Jenkins	Jarmere Jenkins	Brother	
United States	Luke Jensen	Murphy Jensen	Brother	
United States	Luke Jensen	Rachel Jensen	Sister	
United States	Luke Jensen	Rebecca Jensen	Sister	
United States	Murphy Jensen	Luke Jensen	Brother	
United States	Murphy Jensen	Rachel Jensen	Sister	
United States	Murphy Jensen	Rebecca Jensen	Sister	
United States	Rachel Jensen	Luke Jensen	Brother	
United States	Rachel Jensen	Murphy Jensen	Brother	
United States	Rachel Jensen	Rebecca Jensen	Twin sister	
United States	Rebecca Jensen	Luke Jensen	Brother	
United States	Rebecca Jensen	Murphy Jensen	Brother	
United States	Rebecca Jensen	Rachel Jensen	Twin sister	
United States	Kelly Jones	Tami Whitlinger	Wife	
United States	Barbara Jordan	Kathy Jordan	Sister	
United States	Kathy Jordan	Barbara Jordan	Sister	
United States	Kathrin Keil	Mark Keil	Brother	
United States	Mark Keil	Kathrin Keil	Sister	
United States	Madison Keys	Bjorn Fratangelo	Husband	
United States	Billie Jean King	Ilana Kloss	Wife	
United States	Phillip King	Vania King	Sister	
United States	Vania King	Phillip King	Brother	
United States	Howard Kinsey	Robert Kinsey	Brother	
United States	Robert Kinsey	Howard Kinsey	Brother	
United States	Toby Kodat	Nicole Vaidišová	Half-sister	
United States	Sebastian Korda	Petr Korda	Father	
United States	Sebastian Korda	Regina Rajchrtová	Mother	
United States	Frank Kovacs	Virginia Wolfenden	Ex-wife	
United States	Austin Krajicek	Michaëlla Krajicek	Cousin	
United States	Austin Krajicek	Richard Krajicek	Cousin	
United States	Mike Kreiss	Robert Kreiss	Brother	
United States	Robert Kreiss	Mike Kreiss	Brother	
United States	Edward Larned	William Larned	Brother	
United States	William Larned	Edward Larned	Brother	
United States	Dick Leach	Jagger Leach	Grandson	
United States	Dick Leach	Jon Leach	Son	
United States	Dick Leach	Rick Leach	Son	
United States	Jagger Leach	Lindsay Davenport	Mother	
United States	Jagger Leach	Dick Leach	Grandfather	
United States	Jagger Leach	Jon Leach	Father	
United States	Jagger Leach	Rick Leach	Uncle	
United States	Jon Leach	Lindsay Davenport	Wife	
United States	Jon Leach	Jagger Leach	Son	
United States	Jon Leach	Dick Leach	Father	
United States	Jon Leach	Rick Leach	Brother	
United States	Rick Leach	Dick Leach	Father	
United States	Rick Leach	Jagger Leach	Nephew	
United States	Rick Leach	Jon Leach	Brother	
United States	Marcie Louie	Peanut Louie Harper	Sister	
United States	Peanut Louie Harper	Marcie Louie	Sister	
United States	Amber Liu	Michael Chang	Husband	
United States	Elizabeth Mandlik	Hana Mandlíková	Mother	
United States	Maria Mateas	Mackenzie McDonald	Fiancé	
United States	Alysia May	Taylor Fritz	Nephew	
United States	Alysia May	Kathy May	Sister	
United States	Kathy May	Taylor Fritz	Son	
United States	Kathy May	Alysia May	Sister	
United States	Kathy May	Brian Teacher	Ex-husband	
United States	Gene Mayer	Sandy Mayer	Brother	
United States	Sandy Mayer	Gene Mayer	Brother	
United States	Chris Mayotte	Tim Mayotte	Brother	
United States	Tim Mayotte	Chris Mayotte	Brother	
United States	Cammy MacGregor	Cynthia MacGregor	Sister	
United States	Cynthia MacGregor	Cammy MacGregor	Sister	
United States	Mackenzie McDonald	Maria Mateas	Fiancée	
United States	John McEnroe	Patrick McEnroe	Brother	
United States	Patrick McEnroe	John McEnroe	Brother	
United States	Chuck McKinley	Robert McKinley	Brother	
United States	Robert McKinley	Chuck McKinley	Brother	
United States	Caty McNally	John McNally	Brother	
United States	John McNally	Caty McNally	Sister	
United States	Michael Mmoh	Tony Mmoh	Father	
United States	Chet Murphy	William Murphy	Twin brother	
United States	William Murphy	Chet Murphy	Twin brother	
United States	Brandon Nakashima	Bryce Nakashima	Brother	
United States	Bryce Nakashima	Brandon Nakashima	Brother	
United States	Carr Neel	Sam Neel	Brother	
United States	Sam Neel	Carr Neel	Brother	
United States	Clervie Ngounoue	Malkia Ngounoue	Sister	
United States	Malkia Ngounoue	Clervie Ngounoue	Sister	
United States	Sarah Palfrey Cooke	Elwood Cooke	Husband	
United States	Annika Penickova	Olga Hostáková	Mother	
United States	Annika Penickova	Kristina Penickova	Twin sister	
United States	Kristina Penickova	Olga Hostáková	Mother	
United States	Kristina Penickova	Annika Penickova	Twin sister	
United States	Bob Perry	Norm Perry	Brother	
United States	Norm Perry	Bob Perry	Brother	
United States	Glenn Petrovic	Vladimir Petrović	Father	
United States	Oracene Price	Richard Williams	Ex-husband	
United States	Oracene Price	Serena Williams	Daughter	
United States	Oracene Price	Venus Williams	Daughter	
United States	Martin Redlicki	Michael Redlicki	Brother	
United States	Michael Redlicki	Martin Redlicki	Brother	
United States	Raz Reid	Kerry Melville	Wife	
United States	Cliff Richey	Nancy Richey	Sister	
United States	Nancy Richey	Cliff Richey	Brother	
United States	Alison Riske-Amritraj	Stephen Amritraj	Husband	
United States	Alison Riske-Amritraj	Sarah Riske	Sister	
United States	Sarah Riske	Alison Riske-Amritraj	Sister	
United States	Andy Roddick	John Roddick	Brother	
United States	John Roddick	Andy Roddick	Brother	
United States	Ellen Roosevelt	Grace Roosevelt	Sister	
United States	Grace Roosevelt	Ellen Roosevelt	Sister	
United States	Laurie Rowley	Carrie Fleming	Sister	
United States	Pete Sampras	Stella Sampras	Sister	
United States	Stella Sampras	Pete Sampras	Brother	
United States	Adam Scheinman	Andrew Scheinman	Brother	
United States	Andrew Scheinman	Adam Scheinman	Brother	
United States	Katie Schlukebir	Kristen Schlukebir	Sister	
United States	Kristen Schlukebir	Katie Schlukebir	Sister	
United States	Jill Schwikert	Joy Schwikert	Twin sister	
United States	Joy Schwikert	Jill Schwikert	Twin sister	
United States	Eleonora Sears	Evelyn Sears	Sister	
United States	Evelyn Sears	Eleonora Sears	Sister	
United States	Herbert M. Sears	Philip Sears	Twin brother	
United States	Herbert M. Sears	Richard Sears	Brother	
United States	Herbert M. Sears	Quincy Shaw	Cousin	
United States	Philip Sears	Herbert M. Sears	Twin brother	
United States	Philip Sears	Richard Sears	Brother	
United States	Philip Sears	Quincy Shaw	Cousin	
United States	Richard Sears	Herbert M. Sears	Brother	
United States	Richard Sears	Philip Sears	Brother	
United States	Richard Sears	Quincy Shaw	Cousin	
United States	Spencer Segura	Pancho Segura	Father	
United States	Robert Seguso	Carling Bassett-Seguso	Wife	
United States	Quincy Shaw	Herbert M. Sears	Cousin	
United States	Quincy Shaw	Philip Sears	Cousin	
United States	Quincy Shaw	Richard Sears	Cousin	
United States	Ben Shelton	Bryan Shelton	Father	
United States	Ben Shelton	Todd Witsken	Uncle	
United States	Bryan Shelton	Ben Shelton	Son	
United States	David Sherbeck	Eric Sherbeck	Brother	
United States	Eric Sherbeck	David Sherbeck	Brother	
United States	Stan Smith	Marjory Gengler	Wife	
United States	Eric Sock	Jack Sock	Brother	
United States	Jack Sock	Eric Sock	Brother	
United States	Luanne Spadea	Vince Spadea	Brother	
United States	Vince Spadea	Luanne Spadea	Sister	
United States	Mike Sprengelmeyer	Mitch Sprengelmeyer	Son	
United States	Mitch Sprengelmeyer	Mike Sprengelmeyer	Father	
United States	Curt Stalder	Diane Desfor	Wife	
United States	Curt Stalder	Reese Stalder	Son	
United States	Reese Stalder	Diane Desfor	Mother	
United States	Reese Stalder	Curt Stalder	Father	
United States	Sandy Stap	Sue Stap	Sister	
United States	Sue Stap	Sandy Stap	Sister	
United States	Chauncey Steele Jr.	Chauncey Steele III	Son	
United States	Chauncey Steele III	Chauncey Steele Jr.	Father	
United States	Charles Strode	Morris Strode	Brother	
United States	Morris Strode	Charles Strode	Brother	
United States	Ken Stuart	Betty Ann Grubb Stuart	Ex-wife	
United States	Cliff Sutter	Ernest Sutter	Brother	
United States	Ernest Sutter	Cliff Sutter	Brother	
United States	Ethel Sutton Bruce	Dorothy Cheney	Niece	
United States	Ethel Sutton Bruce	John Doeg	Nephew	
United States	Ethel Sutton Bruce	Florence Sutton	Sister	
United States	Ethel Sutton Bruce	May Sutton	Sister	
United States	Florence Sutton	Dorothy Cheney	Niece	
United States	Florence Sutton	John Doeg	Nephew	
United States	Florence Sutton	Ethel Sutton Bruce	Sister	
United States	Florence Sutton	May Sutton	Sister	
United States	May Sutton	Tom Bundy	Ex-husband	
United States	May Sutton	Dorothy Cheney	Daughter	
United States	May Sutton	John Doeg	Nephew	
United States	May Sutton	Ethel Sutton Bruce	Sister	
United States	May Sutton	Florence Sutton	Sister	
United States	Trevor Svajda	Zachary Svajda	Brother	
United States	Zachary Svajda	Trevor Svajda	Brother	
United States	Brian Teacher	Kathy May	Ex-wife	
United States	Laurie Tenney	Robin Tenney	Sister	
United States	Robin Tenney	Laurie Tenney	Sister	
United States	Bill Tilden	Herbert M. Tilden	Brother	
United States	Herbert M. Tilden	Bill Tilden	Brother	
United States	Jeff Turpin	Mark Turpin	Brother	
United States	Mark Turpin	Jeff Turpin	Brother	
United States	Alice Tym	Bill Tym	Husband	
United States	Bill Tym	Alice Tym	Wife	
United States	Neha Uberoi	Shikha Uberoi	Sister	
United States	Shikha Uberoi	Neha Uberoi	Sister	
United States	John Van Nostrand	Kingdon Van Nostrand	Father	
United States	John Van Nostrand	Molly Van Nostrand	Sister	
United States	Kingdon Van Nostrand	John Van Nostrand	Son	
United States	Kingdon Van Nostrand	Molly Van Nostrand	Daughter	
United States	Molly Van Nostrand	John Van Nostrand	Brother	
United States	Molly Van Nostrand	Kingdon Van Nostrand	Father	
United States	Nels Van Patten	Vincent Van Patten	Brother	
United States	Vincent Van Patten	Nels Van Patten	Brother	
United States	John Van Ryn	Marjorie Gladman	Wife	
United States	Erik Van't Hof	Kaes Van't Hof	Nephew	
United States	Erik Van't Hof	Robert Van't Hof	Brother	
United States	Kaes Van't Hof	Erik Van't Hof	Uncle	
United States	Kaes Van't Hof	Robert Van't Hof	Father	
United States	Robert Van't Hof	Erik Van't Hof	Brother	
United States	Robert Van't Hof	Kaes Van't Hof	Son	
United States	Jack Vance	Jamie Vance	Twin brother	
United States	Jamie Vance	Jack Vance	Twin brother	
United States	Becky Vest	Dorothy Vest	Mother	
United States	Dorothy Vest	Becky Vest	Daughter	
United States	Butch Walts	Allyson Ingram	Wife	
United States	MaliVai Washington	Mashiska Washington	Sister	
United States	MaliVai Washington	Mashona Washington	Sister	
United States	MaliVai Washington	Michaela Washington	Sister	
United States	Mashiska Washington	MaliVai Washington	Brother	
United States	Mashiska Washington	Mashona Washington	Sister	
United States	Mashiska Washington	Michaela Washington	Sister	
United States	Mashona Washington	MaliVai Washington	Brother	
United States	Mashona Washington	Mashiska Washington	Sister	
United States	Mashona Washington	Michaela Washington	Sister	
United States	Michaela Washington	MaliVai Washington	Brother	
United States	Michaela Washington	Mashiska Washington	Sister	
United States	Michaela Washington	Mashona Washington	Sister	
United States	Arthur Wear	Joseph Wear	Brother	
United States	Joseph Wear	Arthur Wear	Brother	
United States	John Whitlinger	Tami Whitlinger	Niece	
United States	John Whitlinger	Teri Whitlinger	Niece	
United States	Tami Whitlinger	Kelly Jones	Husband	
United States	Tami Whitlinger	John Whitlinger	Uncle	
United States	Tami Whitlinger	Teri Whitlinger	Twin sister	
United States	Teri Whitlinger	Craig Boynton	Husband	
United States	Teri Whitlinger	John Whitlinger	Uncle	
United States	Teri Whitlinger	Tami Whitlinger	Twin sister	
United States	Blaine Willenborg	Chuck Willenborg	Brother	
United States	Chuck Willenborg	Blaine Willenborg	Brother	
United States	Richard Williams	Oracene Price	Ex-wife	
United States	Richard Williams	Serena Williams	Daughter	
United States	Richard Williams	Venus Williams	Daughter	
United States	Serena Williams	Oracene Price	Mother	
United States	Serena Williams	Richard Williams	Father	
United States	Serena Williams	Venus Williams	Sister	
United States	Venus Williams	Oracene Price	Mother	
United States	Venus Williams	Richard Williams	Father	
United States	Venus Williams	Serena Williams	Sister	
United States	Todd Witsken	Ben Shelton	Nephew	
United States	Virginia Wolfenden	Frank Kovacs	Ex-husband	
United States	George Wrenn	Robert Wrenn	Brother	
United States	Robert Wrenn	George Wrenn	Brother	
United States	Allura Zamarripa	Maribella Zamarripa	Twin sister	
United States	Maribella Zamarripa	Allura Zamarripa	Twin sister	
United States	Valerie Ziegenfuss	Allison Bradshaw	Daughter	

== Oceania ==
Country of origin	Person 1	Person 2	Relationship	Ref.
Australia	Peter Cawthorn	Lorna Cornell	Ex-wife	
Australia	Ashley Cooper	John Cooper	Brother	
Australia	John Cooper	Ashley Cooper	Brother	
Australia	Jack Crawford	Joan Gibson	Niece	
Australia	Jack Crawford	Neil Gibson	Nephew	
Australia	Jack Crawford	Allan Kendall	Nephew	
Australia	Alex de Minaur	Katie Boulter	Wife	
Australia	Jake Delaney	Jesse Delaney	Brother	
Australia	Jesse Delaney	Jake Delaney	Brother	
Australia	Phil Dent	Betty Ann Grubb Stuart	Wife	
Australia	Phil Dent	Brett Hansen-Dent	Stepson	
Australia	Phil Dent	Taylor Dent	Son	
Australia	Mark Draper	Scott Draper	Brother	
Australia	Scott Draper	Mark Draper	Brother	
Australia	Alfred Dunlop	Ray Dunlop	Nephew	
Australia	Ray Dunlop	Alfred Dunlop	Uncle	
Australia	Joshua Eagle	Barbara Schett	Wife	
Australia	Antony Emerson	Roy Emerson	Father	
Australia	Roy Emerson	Antony Emerson	Son	
Australia	Roy Emerson	Karen Smith	Niece	
Australia	Charlie Fancutt	Michael Fancutt	Brother	
Australia	Charlie Fancutt	Thomas Fancutt	Nephew	
Australia	Charlie Fancutt	Trevor Fancutt	Father	
Australia	Charlie Fancutt	Daphne Seeney	Mother	
Australia	Michael Fancutt	Charlie Fancutt	Brother	
Australia	Michael Fancutt	Thomas Fancutt	Nephew	
Australia	Michael Fancutt	Trevor Fancutt	Father	
Australia	Michael Fancutt	Daphne Seeney	Mother	
Australia	Thomas Fancutt	Charlie Fancutt	Uncle	
Australia	Thomas Fancutt	Michael Fancutt	Uncle	
Australia	Thomas Fancutt	Trevor Fancutt	Grandfather	
Australia	Thomas Fancutt	Daphne Seeney	Grandmother	
Australia	John Frawley	Rod Frawley	Brother	
Australia	Rod Frawley	John Frawley	Brother	
Australia	Joan Gibson	Jack Crawford	Uncle	
Australia	Joan Gibson	Neil Gibson	Brother	
Australia	Neil Gibson	Jack Crawford	Uncle	
Australia	Neil Gibson	Joan Gibson	Sister	
Australia	Bill Gilmour	Bill Gilmour Jr.	Son	
Australia	Bill Gilmour Jr.	Bill Gilmour	Father	
Australia	Sam Groth	Jarmila Wolfe	Ex-wife	
Australia	Cruz Hewitt	Jaslyn Hewitt	Aunt	
Australia	Cruz Hewitt	Lleyton Hewitt	Father	
Australia	Jaslyn Hewitt	Cruz Hewitt	Nephew	
Australia	Jaslyn Hewitt	Lleyton Hewitt	Brother	
Australia	Lleyton Hewitt	Cruz Hewitt	Son	
Australia	Lleyton Hewitt	Jaslyn Hewitt	Sister	
Australia	Stephen Huss	Milagros Sequera	Wife	
Australia	Emerson Jones	Hayden Jones	Brother	
Australia	Hayden Jones	Emerson Jones	Sister	
Australia	Allan Kendall	Jack Crawford	Uncle	
Australia	Andrew Kratzmann	Mark Kratzmann	Brother	
Australia	Mark Kratzmann	Andrew Kratzmann	Brother	
Australia	Brent Larkham	Todd Larkham	Brother	
Australia	Todd Larkham	Brent Larkham	Brother	
Australia	Cliff Letcher	Sophie Letcher	Daughter	
Australia	Sophie Letcher	Cliff Letcher	Father	
Australia	Carl Limberger	Claudine Toleafoa	Wife	
Australia	Elizabeth Little	John Peers	Son	
Australia	Elizabeth Little	Sally Peers	Daughter	
Australia	Kerry Melville	Raz Reid	Husband	
Australia	Shannon Nettle	Luke Saville	Cousin	
Australia	Arthur O'Hara Wood	Pat O'Hara Wood	Brother	
Australia	Pat O'Hara Wood	Arthur O'Hara Wood	Brother	
Australia	John Peers	Elizabeth Little	Mother	
Australia	John Peers	Sally Peers	Sister	
Australia	Sally Peers	Elizabeth Little	Mother	
Australia	Sally Peers	John Peers	Brother	
Australia	Kerryn Pratt	Maureen Pratt	Mother	
Australia	Maureen Pratt	Kerryn Pratt	Daughter	
Australia	Anastasia Rodionova	Arina Rodionova	Sister	
Australia	Arina Rodionova	Anastasia Rodionova	Sister	
Australia	Daria Saville	Luke Saville	Husband	
Australia	Luke Saville	Shannon Nettle	Cousin	
Australia	Luke Saville	Daria Saville	Wife	
Australia	Daphne Seeney	Charlie Fancutt	Son	
Australia	Daphne Seeney	Michael Fancutt	Son	
Australia	Daphne Seeney	Thomas Fancutt	Grandson	
Australia	Daphne Seeney	Trevor Fancutt	Husband	
Australia	Karen Smith	Roy Emerson	Uncle	
Australia	Fred Stolle	Sandon Stolle	Son	
Australia	Sandon Stolle	Fred Stolle	Father	
Australia	Adam Taylor	Jason Taylor	Brother	
Australia	Jason Taylor	Adam Taylor	Brother	
Australia	Bernard Tomic	Sara Tomic	Sister	
Australia	Sara Tomic	Bernard Tomic	Brother	
Australia	Jarmila Wolfe	Sam Groth	Ex-husband	
New Zealand	Hana Guy	Steve Guy	Husband	
New Zealand	Steve Guy	Hana Guy	Wife	
New Zealand	Chris Lewis	David Lewis	Brother	
New Zealand	Chris Lewis	Jade Lewis	Niece	
New Zealand	Chris Lewis	Mark Lewis	Brother	
New Zealand	David Lewis	Chris Lewis	Brother	
New Zealand	David Lewis	Jade Lewis	Daughter	
New Zealand	David Lewis	Mark Lewis	Brother	
New Zealand	Jade Lewis	Chris Lewis	Uncle	
New Zealand	Jade Lewis	David Lewis	Father	
New Zealand	Jade Lewis	Mark Lewis	Uncle	
New Zealand	Mark Lewis	Chris Lewis	Brother	
New Zealand	Mark Lewis	David Lewis	Brother	
New Zealand	Mark Lewis	Jade Lewis	Niece	
New Zealand	Eden Marama	Paula Marama	Sister	
New Zealand	Paula Marama	Eden Marama	Sister	
New Zealand	Onny Parun	Michelle Parun	Niece	
New Zealand	Onny Parun	Tony Parun	Brother	
New Zealand	Michelle Parun	Onny Parun	Uncle	
New Zealand	Tony Parun	Onny Parun	Brother	
New Zealand	Jeff Simpson	Matt Simpson	Son	
New Zealand	Jeff Simpson	Russell Simpson	Brother	
New Zealand	Matt Simpson	Jeff Simpson	Father	
New Zealand	Matt Simpson	Russell Simpson	Uncle	
New Zealand	Russell Simpson	Jeff Simpson	Brother	
New Zealand	Russell Simpson	Matt Simpson	Nephew	
New Zealand	Artem Sitak	Dmitri Sitak	Brother	
New Zealand	Mikal Statham	Rubin Statham	Twin brother	
New Zealand	Rubin Statham	Mikal Statham	Twin brother	
New Zealand	Claudine Toleafoa	Carl Limberger	Husband	
New Zealand	Anthony Wilding	Frederick Wilding	Father	
New Zealand	Frederick Wilding	Anthony Wilding	Son	
Palau	Ayana Rengiil	Ernestine Rengiil	Mother	
Palau	Ernestine Rengiil	Ayana Rengiil	Daughter	
Papua New Guinea	Violet Apisah	Abigail Tere-Apisah	Aunt	
Papua New Guinea	Abigail Tere-Apisah	Violet Apisah	Niece	

== South America ==
Country of origin	Person 1	Person 2	Relationship	Ref.
Argentina	Lucas Arnold Ker	Patricio Arnold	Brother	
Argentina	Patricio Arnold	Lucas Arnold Ker	Brother	
Argentina	Francisco Cerúndolo	Juan Manuel Cerúndolo	Brother	
Argentina	Juan Manuel Cerúndolo	Francisco Cerúndolo	Brother	
Argentina	Federico Coria	Guillermo Coria	Brother	
Argentina	Guillermo Coria	Federico Coria	Brother	
Argentina	Alejandro Ganzábal	Julián Ganzábal	Brother	
Argentina	Julián Ganzábal	Alejandro Ganzábal	Brother	
Argentina	Alejandro Gattiker	Carlos Gattiker	Brother	
Argentina	Carlos Gattiker	Alejandro Gattiker	Brother	
Argentina	Edgardo Giussani	Gustavo Giussani	Brother	
Argentina	Edgardo Giussani	Liliana Giussani	Sister	
Argentina	Gustavo Giussani	Edgardo Giussani	Brother	
Argentina	Gustavo Giussani	Liliana Giussani	Sister	
Argentina	Liliana Giussani	Edgardo Giussani	Brother	
Argentina	Liliana Giussani	Gustavo Giussani	Brother	
Argentina	Erica Krauth	Vanesa Krauth	Twin sister	
Argentina	Vanesa Krauth	Erica Krauth	Twin sister	
Argentina	Facundo Lugones	Christian Miniussi	Uncle	
Argentina	Edgardo Massa	Emiliano Massa	Brother	
Argentina	Emiliano Massa	Edgardo Massa	Brother	
Argentina	Christian Miniussi	Facundo Lugones	Nephew	
Argentina	Catalina Pella	Guido Pella	Brother	
Argentina	Guido Pella	Catalina Pella	Sister	
Argentina	Mary Terán de Weiss	Heraldo Weiss	Husband	
Argentina	Heraldo Weiss	Mary Terán de Weiss	Wife	
Argentina	Francisco Yunis	Juan Carlos Yunis	Brother	
Argentina	Juan Carlos Yunis	Francisco Yunis	Brother	
Bolivia	Daniela Álvarez	María Fernanda Álvarez Terán	Sister	
Bolivia	María Fernanda Álvarez Terán	Daniela Álvarez	Sister	
Bolivia	Hugo Dellien	Murkel Dellien	Brother	
Bolivia	Hugo Dellien	Camila Giangreco Campiz	Wife	
Bolivia	Murkel Dellien	Hugo Dellien	Brother	
Bolivia	Federico Zeballos	Noelia Zeballos	Sister	
Bolivia	Noelia Zeballos	Federico Zeballos	Brother	
Brazil	Carolina Alves	Felipe Meligeni Alves	Brother	
Brazil	Carolina Alves	Fernando Meligeni	Uncle	
Brazil	Larissa Carvalho	Raony Carvalho	Brother	
Brazil	Raony Carvalho	Larissa Carvalho	Sister	
Brazil	Carlos Chabalgoity	Cláudia Chabalgoity	Sister	
Brazil	Cláudia Chabalgoity	Carlos Chabalgoity	Brother	
Brazil	Daniel Dutra da Silva	Rogério Dutra da Silva	Brother	
Brazil	Rogério Dutra da Silva	Daniel Dutra da Silva	Brother	
Brazil	Alexandre Hocevar	Marcos Hocevar	Brother	
Brazil	Alexandre Hocevar	Ricardo Hocevar	Nephew	
Brazil	Marcos Hocevar	Alexandre Hocevar	Brother	
Brazil	Marcos Hocevar	Ricardo Hocevar	Nephew	
Brazil	Ricardo Hocevar	Alexandre Hocevar	Uncle	
Brazil	Ricardo Hocevar	Marcos Hocevar	Uncle	
Brazil	José Edison Mandarino	Carmen Mandarino	Wife	
Brazil	Felipe Meligeni Alves	Carolina Alves	Sister	
Brazil	Felipe Meligeni Alves	Fernando Meligeni	Uncle	
Brazil	Fernando Meligeni	Carolina Alves	Niece	
Brazil	Fernando Meligeni	Felipe Meligeni Alves	Nephew	
Brazil	Daniel Melo	Marcelo Melo	Brother	
Brazil	Marcelo Melo	Daniel Melo	Brother	
Brazil	Guto Miguel	Luís Felipe Miguel	Brother	
Brazil	Luís Felipe Miguel	Guto Miguel	Brother	
Brazil	Eduardo Oncins	Jaime Oncins	Brother	
Brazil	Jaime Oncins	Eduardo Oncins	Brother	
Brazil	José Pereira	Teliana Pereira	Sister	
Brazil	Teliana Pereira	José Pereira	Brother	
Chile	Bárbara Castro	Valentina Castro	Sister	
Chile	Valentina Castro	Bárbara Castro	Sister	
Chile	Álvaro Fillol	Jaime Fillol	Brother	
Chile	Álvaro Fillol	Jaime Fillol Jr.	Nephew	
Chile	Álvaro Fillol	Nicolás Jarry	Great-nephew	
Chile	Jaime Fillol	Álvaro Fillol	Brother	
Chile	Jaime Fillol	Jaime Fillol Jr.	Son	
Chile	Jaime Fillol	Nicolás Jarry	Grandson	
Chile	Jaime Fillol Jr.	Álvaro Fillol	Uncle	
Chile	Jaime Fillol Jr.	Jaime Fillol	Father	
Chile	Jaime Fillol Jr.	Nicolás Jarry	Nephew	
Chile	Nicolás Jarry	Álvaro Fillol	Great-uncle	
Chile	Nicolás Jarry	Jaime Fillol	Grandfather	
Chile	Nicolás Jarry	Jaime Fillol Jr.	Uncle	
Chile	Manuel Rodríguez	Michelle Rodríguez	Mother	
Chile	Manuel Rodríguez	Patricio Rodríguez	Father	
Chile	Michelle Rodríguez	Manuel Rodríguez	Son	
Chile	Michelle Rodríguez	Patricio Rodríguez	Husband	
Chile	Patricio Rodríguez	Michelle Rodríguez	Wife	
Chile	Patricio Rodríguez	Manuel Rodríguez	Son	
Colombia	Romy Farah	Robert Farah	Brother	
Colombia	Robert Farah	Romy Farah	Sister	
Colombia	Carmiña Giraldo	Santiago Giraldo	Brother	
Colombia	Santiago Giraldo	Carmiña Giraldo	Sister	
Colombia	María Paulina Pérez	Paula Andrea Pérez	Sister	
Colombia	Paula Andrea Pérez	María Paulina Pérez	Sister	
Colombia	Eduardo Rincón	Mario Rincón	Brother	
Colombia	Mario Rincón	Eduardo Rincón	Brother	
Colombia	Cristian Rodríguez	Óscar Rodríguez	Brother	
Colombia	Óscar Rodríguez	Cristian Rodríguez	Brother	
Colombia	Jairo Velasco Sr.	Gabriela Velasco Andreu	Daughter	
Colombia	Jairo Velasco Sr.	Jairo Velasco Jr.	Son	
Ecuador	María Dolores Campana	Pablo Campana	Brother	
Ecuador	Pablo Campana	María Dolores Campana	Sister	
Ecuador	Andrés Gómez	Emilio Gómez	Son	
Ecuador	Andrés Gómez	Giovanni Lapentti	Nephew	
Ecuador	Andrés Gómez	Nicolás Lapentti	Nephew	
Ecuador	Andrés Gómez	Roberto Quiroz	Nephew	
Ecuador	Emilio Gómez	Andrés Gómez	Father	
Ecuador	Emilio Gómez	Giovanni Lapentti	Cousin	
Ecuador	Emilio Gómez	Nicolás Lapentti	Cousin	
Ecuador	Emilio Gómez	Roberto Quiroz	Cousin	
Ecuador	Giovanni Lapentti	Andrés Gómez	Uncle	
Ecuador	Giovanni Lapentti	Emilio Gómez	Cousin	
Ecuador	Giovanni Lapentti	Nicolás Lapentti	Brother	
Ecuador	Giovanni Lapentti	Roberto Quiroz	Cousin	
Ecuador	Nicolás Lapentti	Andrés Gómez	Uncle	
Ecuador	Nicolás Lapentti	Emilio Gómez	Cousin	
Ecuador	Nicolás Lapentti	Giovanni Lapentti	Brother	
Ecuador	Nicolás Lapentti	Roberto Quiroz	Cousin	
Ecuador	Roberto Quiroz	Andrés Gómez	Uncle	
Ecuador	Roberto Quiroz	Emilio Gómez	Cousin	
Ecuador	Roberto Quiroz	Giovanni Lapentti	Cousin	
Ecuador	Roberto Quiroz	Nicolás Lapentti	Cousin	
Ecuador	Pancho Segura	Spencer Segura	Son	
Ecuador	Ana María Ycaza	Ricardo Ycaza	Brother	
Ecuador	Ricardo Ycaza	Ana María Ycaza	Sister	
Paraguay	Camila Giangreco Campiz	Hugo Dellien	Husband	
Peru	Laura Arraya	Pablo Arraya	Brother	
Peru	Pablo Arraya	Laura Arraya	Sister	
Peru	Arklon Huertas del Pino	Conner Huertas del Pino	Brother	
Peru	Conner Huertas del Pino	Arklon Huertas del Pino	Brother	
Uruguay	Martín Cuevas	Pablo Cuevas	Brother	
Uruguay	Pablo Cuevas	Martín Cuevas	Brother	
Venezuela	Milagros Sequera	Stephen Huss	Husband	

== See also ==
- List of professional sports families
