= Adli El Shafei =

Egyptian tennis player

- Country (sports): Egypt
- Born: 18 April 1919

Singles

Grand Slam singles results
- French Open: 3R (1948)
- Wimbledon: 3R (1946)

Adli El-Shafei (Arabic: عدلي الشافعي) (born 18 April 1919) was an Egyptian Davis Cup Team tennis player from 1946 to 1955. He played 32 matches for Egypt in Davis Cup. He is the father of Ismail El Shafei and grandfather of Adli El Shafei II.
