= Curt Stalder =

American former professional tennis player

- Country (sports): United States
- Born: November 20, 1957 (age 68)

Singles
- Career record: 0–1
- Highest ranking: No. 235 (Jan 16, 1978)

Grand Slam singles results
- Wimbledon: Q1 (1981)

Curt Stalder (born November 20, 1957) is an American former professional tennis player.

A California native, Stalder played collegiate tennis for the UC Irvine Anteaters and won an NCAA Division II doubles championship in 1977. On the professional tour he had a best singles world ranking of 235 and was a main draw qualifier for the 1979 Jack Kramer Open in Los Angeles, losing in the second round to Víctor Pecci.

Stalder's wife, Diane Desfor, was a tennis player and their son, Reese Stalder, competes on the professional circuit.
