= Brenda Nunns =

Canadian former tennis player

- Country (sports): Canada
- Born: September 13, 1945 (age 79)

Singles

Grand Slam singles results
- French Open: 1R (1966)
- US Open: 1R (1964)

Doubles

Grand Slam doubles results
- French Open: 2R (1966)
- US Open: 1R (1964)

Brenda Nunns Shoemaker (born September 13, 1945) is a Canadian former tennis player.

Nunns, a doubles champion at the 1965 Canadian championships, was a national representative in the 1966 Federation Cup, featuring in a tie against Great Britain. She is the daughter of Davis Cup player Gilbert Nunns. Her son, David Shoemaker, is CEO of the Canadian Olympic Committee and a former WTA executive.

== See also ==
- List of Canada Fed Cup team representatives
