= Ivica Ančić =

Croatian tennis player

- Country (sports): Croatia
- Born: October 29, 1979 (age 45); Split, Croatia
- Prize money: $10,208

Singles
- Career record: 0–0
- Highest ranking: No. 378 (October 27, 1997)

Doubles
- Career record: 0–2
- Highest ranking: No. 562 (April 20, 1998)

Ivica Ančić (Croatian pronunciation: [îʋitsa âːntʃitɕ]; born October 29, 1979) is a former professional tennis player from Croatia. His younger siblings, Mario and Sanja, were also professional tennis players.

== Tennis career ==
Ančić was born in Split, at the time in SR Croatia, SFR Yugoslavia. During his career, from 1996 until 2001, Ančić played Challenger and Futures tournaments. He played doubles in two main draw matches at the ATP Tour-level.

Ančić captured one Futures title, Croatia F1 in 2000 in doubles partnering his brother Mario.

Ančić's career highest singles ranking was world no. 378, which he reached October 27, 1997.

In September 2011, he became the coach of Dutch tennis player Thiemo de Bakker. He began coaching fellow Croatian Borna Ćorić in September 2016.

== Tour titles (1) ==
=== Doubles ===
No.	Date	Tournament	Surface	Partner	Opponents in the final	Score
1.	February 14, 2000	Croatia F1 Zagreb	Clay	(Croatia) Mario Ančić	(Croatia) Roko Karanušić (Croatia) Željko Krajan	6–4, 5–7, 7–5
