= Yulia Berberian-Maleeva =

Bulgarian tennis player (born 1944)

Yuliya Berberyan-Maleeva
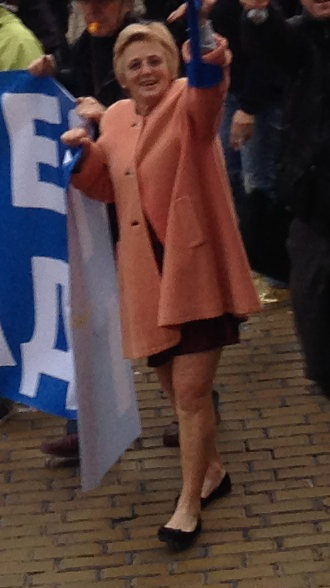
- Country (sports): Bulgaria
- Born: 1940

Doubles
- Career record: 0–4 (Federation Cup)

Yuliya Berberyan-Maleeva (Bulgarian: Юлия Берберян-Малеева; born 1940) is a Bulgarian former tennis player. She and her husband, Georgi Maleev, had three daughters, Manuela, Katerina, and Magdalena, who were coached by their mother and won 40 WTA singles tournaments combined.

== Career ==
Berberian-Maleeva was born in Bulgaria in 1944 to parents of Armenian descent on her father's side. She started playing tennis and eventually won nine Bulgarian national singles titles as well as four Balkans Games titles. Despite restrictions on international travel due to the Bulgarian communist regime, she represented Bulgaria in the 1968 Federation Cup.

When her three daughters were growing up, she became their tennis coach with each of them starting when they were 6. This also included positioning them in strollers facing the courts to watch as she coached tennis. She coached her daughters despite poor availability of tennis courts, lack of suitable tennis shoes and only one wooden racket to practice with. They also encountered difficulties leaving to competed with the Bulgarian USC CSKA Sofia telling her that they could not have Bulgarian passports, though these were later provided.

She would later criticise the Bulgarian Tennis Federation, claiming that they provided no support to the Berberian-Maleevas and accused the Federation of taking her daughters' tennis winnings in 1991. This statement was later amended in 2016 to state that Bulgarian Tennis Federation only took 10% of the winnings. Often they had to fund their own travel with assistance from Berberian-Maleeva's parents, whom lived in the United States as political refugees. Berberian-Maleeva's coaching lasted until 2007 when Magdalena Maleeva retired. As a result of her support and coaching of her daughters, Berberian-Maleeva was awarded the WTA Georgina Clark Mother Award in 2016.
