= Michael Carpenter (tennis) =

Canadian tennis player (1936–2025)

Michael Arthur Carpenter (September 18, 1936 – February 9, 2025) was a Canadian tennis player. He won the Canadian Open 1966 doubles title playing alongside his younger brother, and more accomplished player, Keith Carpenter. Carpenter played tennis for McGill University in his hometown of Montreal. Born in Birmingham, England on September 18, 1936, he died in Santa Fe, New Mexico on February 9, 2025, at the age of 88.
