= Jorge Gisbert =

Spanish tennis player (born 1950)

- Full name: Jorge Gisbert Ortiga
- Country (sports): Spain
- Residence: Barcelona, Spain
- Born: 1950 (age 74–75); Barcelona, Spain

Singles
- Career record: 0–1

Jorge Gisbert Ortiga (born 1950) is a retired tennis player from Barcelona, Spain. His two older brothers, Juan and José María, competed for Spain in the Davis Cup, and the former was a Grand Slam singles finalist.

As a junior player, his most remarkable result came at the 1968 Orange Bowl. He defeated Carlos Kirmayr and Jorge Andrew before losing to Fred Hemmes Sr. in the third round.

In 1969, he entered the main draw of the Barcelona Open, which was part of the 1969 ITF Men's Tennis tour, and lost in the first round to eventual champion Manuel Orantes. He failed to make it through qualifiers in subsequent editions of the tournament.
