= Steven Capriati =

American tennis player

- Country (sports): United States
- Born: August 15, 1979 (age 47)
- Plays: Right-handed

Singles
- Highest ranking: No. 1295 (Oct 5, 1998)

Grand Slam mixed doubles results
- French Open: 1R (2002)
- Wimbledon: 1R (2001)
- US Open: 1R (2001)

Steven Capriati (born August 15, 1979) is an American former professional tennis player. He is now an attorney.

Capriati, coached by his father Stefano, is a Saddlebrook graduate. He played collegiate tennis for the University of South Florida (as a freshman) and the University of Arizona. A world ranked player in singles, Capriati featured at grand slam level in mixed doubles with his elder sister Jennifer, including at the 2001 Wimbledon Championships.
