= Javier Contreras (tennis) =

Mexican tennis player and coach

- Full name: Javier Contreras Rodríguez
- Country (sports): Mexico
- Born: 27 March 1960 (age 64); Mexico City, Mexico
- Height: 5 ft 8 in (173 cm)
- Plays: Right-handed

Singles
- Highest ranking: No. 298 (17 Sep 1984)

Doubles
- Career record: 0–3
- Highest ranking: No. 506 (17 Sep 1984)

Javier Contreras Rodríguez (born 27 March 1960) is a Mexican former professional tennis player. He now coaches tennis in Texas.

Born in Mexico City, Contreras is the son of former Davis Cup player and team captain "Pancho" Contreras.

Contreras played on the international tour in the 1980s, reaching a best singles ranking of 298. He represented the Mexico Davis Cup team in a 1984 tie against Chile in Santiago, where he lost his reverse singles rubber to Pedro Rebolledo. His best result on tour was a runner-up finish to Tim Wilkison at the 1984 San Luis Potosí Challenger.

His daughter Fernanda Contreras is a professional tennis player.

== ATP Challenger Tour finals ==
=== Singles: 1 (1 runner-up) ===
Legend ATP Challenger Tour (0–1)

Result	W–L	Date	Tournament	Tier	Surface	Opponent	Score
Loss	0–1	Apr 1984	San Luis Potosí, Mexico	Challenger	Clay	(United States) Tim Wilkison	2–6, 2–6

== See also ==
- List of Mexico Davis Cup team representatives
