= Tomasz Maliszewski =

Polish tennis player

- Country (sports): Poland
- Born: 14 February 1965 (age 60); Wrocław, Poland

Singles
- Highest ranking: No. 713 (28 September 1987)

Doubles
- Career record: 1–0
- Highest ranking: No. 784 (23 June 1986)

Tomasz Maliszewski (born 14 February 1965) is a Polish former professional tennis player.

Born in Wrocław, Maliszewski has been considered the best Polish doubles player at the end of the 1980s. He retired very young, at age 24, due to injuries. His serve was his best weapon on the court, thanks to his considerable height.

In doubles, Maliszewski clinched the Polish national championships three times (in 1986, 1987 and 1989), always partnering with Wojciech Kowalski. Also alongside Kowalski, he won a Davis Cup rubber in 1988.

Despite being a doubles specialist, he was ranked among the top 10 singles players in Poland for six consecutive years (from 1984 to 1989).

One of his nephews is professional tennis player Hubert Hurkacz.

== See also ==
- List of Poland Davis Cup team representatives
