= José María Gisbert =

Spanish tennis player (born 1945)

- Country (sports): Spain
- Residence: Barcelona, Spain
- Born: 7 February 1945 (age 80); Barcelona, Spain

Singles

Grand Slam singles results
- Australian Open: 2R (1966)
- French Open: 2R (1967)
- Wimbledon: 1R (1964, 1967)

Doubles

Grand Slam doubles results
- Wimbledon: 2R (1967)

Grand Slam mixed doubles results
- Wimbledon: 1R (1964)
Medal record
Summer Universiade
| Gold medal – first place | 1967 Tokyo | Doubles |

José María Gisbert Ortiga (born 7 February 1945) is a retired amateur and professional tennis player from the 1960s. He is a brother of Juan Gisbert Sr. and Jorge Gisbert.

He played in a Davis Cup tie for Spain in 1969 and won the only match he played, which was a dead rubber.
