= Chet Murphy =

American tennis player

- Born: November 15, 1917; Chicago, Illinois, U.S.
- Died: July 7, 2016 (aged 98)
- Education: University of Chicago
- Occupations: Tennis player and coach
- Known for: Big Ten doubles tennis champion, 1938, 1939; Colorado Tennis Hall of Fame

Chester "Chet" Murphy (November 15, 1917 – July 7, 2016) was an American tennis player, coach, instructor and author. In 1938 and 1939, Murphy and his twin brother, William, won consecutive Big Ten Conference doubles championships while competing for the University of Chicago. In 1939, he was also the runner-up in the NCAA singles and doubles championships. Murphy later had a long career as a tennis coach and instructor at the University of Minnesota, the University of California, Berkeley and The Broadmoor Resort in Colorado Springs. He has also published several books on tennis.

== Tennis player ==
A native of Chicago, Illinois, Murphy and twin brother, William, began to play as a doubles team for Tilden High School in Chicago. The brothers won the Illinois High School Athletics Association state championship in doubles in both 1934 and 1935.

They played for the University of Chicago from 1937 to 1939, leading the school to three Big Ten tennis championships. As a doubles team, they were "undefeated in collegiate meets," including wins at the Big Ten doubles championships in 1938 and 1939. They were also the runner-up team at the 1939 NCAA doubles championship.

In 1938, the Murphy brothers helped the undefeated University of Chicago tennis team score the first clean sweep in the history of the Big Ten tennis championships by winning all nine finals matches at Evanston, Illinois. The brothers won the doubles title over the Northwestern team, 5-7, 6-4, 7-5. John Shostrom won the No. 1 singles and the Murphy brothers won the No. 2 and No. 3 singles. At the national level, the Murphy brothers were ranked as the #10 doubles pair by the United States Lawn Tennis Association in 1938.

In May 1939, when the Murphy brothers led the University of Chicago to its third straight Big Ten Tennis Championship, the Associated Press wrote: "The University of Chicago, where the athletic habit of recent years had leaned toward defeat, now has a new complex well-established – tennis championships." The Murphy brothers won their second consecutive doubles championship, and Chet won the No. 1 singles. In June 1939, the brothers were runners-up in the NCAA doubles championship to Bob Peacock and Doug Imhoff of University of California-Berkeley, and Chet was runner-up in the NCAA singles championship to Frank Guernsey of Rice in Texas. In US Singles competition, Chet played Bill Talbert several times and never lost to him. He was one of the best tennis players in the United States at that time.

In May 1939, Murphy played an exhibition match against the top-ranked American female tennis player, Alice Marble. The match was played in front of a "throng of 2,000, so crowded it was difficult to watch," with Murphy winning in straight sets, 6-4, 6-3.

== Tennis coach and author ==
In 1941, Murphy received a master's degree in physical education from George Williams College in Chicago. Then he served five years as a naval aviator in World War II. After being discharged from the Navy, Murphy began a career as a tennis coach. He taught Lorraine Williams, who won the National 15 Singles title in 1953. He taught and coached tennis at the University of Chicago, University of Detroit, University of Denver, University of Minnesota and University of California, Berkeley. In four years at Minnesota (1956–1959), Murphy started with a team in 1956 that went 1-7, but turned the program into a winner with a 9-4 record in 1959. In ten years as the tennis coach at California (1960–1969), Murphy compiled a record of 80-52. His best season at Cal was 1961. With #1 player, Jim McManus, his team finished with a record of 11-3, placed third in the AAWU, and advanced to the NCAA Semifinals, finishing third.

While on a summer break from college coaching, Murphy accepted a position as Head Tennis Professional at The Broadmoor Resort in Colorado Springs. He returned the following summer and began a program that "helped establish the Broadmoor as one of the preeminent tennis centers in the United States." In addition to collegiate coaching, Murphy directed the tennis programs at The Broadmoor for 44 summers.

Murphy had success as a writer of books about tennis. He and his brother, Bill, co-authored the "Tennis Handbook", first published in 1962. On his own or as a co-author with his brother, Chet Murphy also wrote "Advanced Tennis," "Tennis for the Player, Teacher, and Coach," "Tennis for Thinking Players," "Lifetime of Tested Tennis Tips," and "A Parents Guide to Teaching Kids to Play."

In 1956, Murphy received a Doctor of Education degree from the University of Michigan. In 2000, Murphy moved to Tucson, Arizona to be with brother Bill, who died in 2005. In 2014, after his son Tony died, he left Tucson to live with his son Tom, in Newnan, Georgia. Chet Murphy died in July 2016 at the age of 98.

== Honors and Halls of Fame ==
Murphy has received numerous honors over the years, including the following:

- In 1973, the International Tennis Hall of Fame awarded its Tennis Educational Merit Award to Chet and Bill Murphy; they were the seventh recipient of the award.
- In 1985, Murphy was inducted into the Intercollegiate Tennis Association Hall of Fame; his brother William was inducted in 1984.
- In 2003, the Murphy brothers were jointly inducted into the University of Chicago Athletics Hall of Fame.
- In 2005, for his contributions in building The Broadmoor Resort into one of the leading tennis centers in the United States, Murphy was inducted into the Colorado Tennis Hall of Fame.
- in 2003, the Murphys were inducted into the Tilden Tech High School Hall of Fame in Chicago.

== See also ==
- William Murphy (tennis)
