= Leonardo Manta =

Swiss tennis player

- Country (sports): Switzerland
- Born: 5 January 1950 (age 75)

Leonardo Manta (born 5 September 1950) is an Italian-born Swiss former tennis player.

Manta was a Davis Cup player for Switzerland, with an appearance in a tie against Spain in Basel in 1971. Partnering with Matthias Werren, he competed in the doubles rubber against Juan Gisbert Sr. and Manuel Orantes.

His best result in singles came at the 1971 Swiss Indoors. He reached the final but eventually lost to Jean-Claude Barclay.

Both his son Lorenzo and his daughter Joana followed his steps and became professional tennis players.

== See also ==
- List of Switzerland Davis Cup team representatives
