= Jorge Fernandez (tennis coach) =

Canadian tennis coach and former association football player and coach

Jorge Fernández is a Canadian tennis coach and former association football player and coach. He is the father and coach of professional tennis player Leylah Fernandez who was a finalist in the 2021 US Open Women's Singles finals against Emma Raducanu.

== Early and family life ==
Fernandez was born in Guayaquil, Ecuador. When he was four years old, his family relocated to Montreal, Canada, and he became a Canadian citizen when he was 14. His wife Irene Exevea is a Canadian of Filipino descent.

== Career ==
Fernandez was a semi-professional footballer and played football in local leagues in Montreal. He is the father and coach of professional tennis player Leylah Fernandez and her younger sister Bianca Jolie. He started coaching his daughter despite never having played tennis himself, however he draws his coaching skills from his footballing career.
