= Wayne Bryan =

American tennis coach, author, and speaker

Wayne Bryan is an American tennis coach, author and speaker. He is the former owner and tennis director of the Cabrillo Racquet Club and father of the Bryan brothers, Bob and Mike, the most successful professional doubles team in tennis history.

== Early life and education ==
While attending the University of California, Santa Barbara from 1965 to 1969, he played for the UC Santa Barbara Gauchos tennis team as the No. 1 singles and doubles player.

== Coaching career ==
Bryan was voted World Team Tennis coach of the year for three consecutive seasons (2011–13).

=== Philosophy ===
The cornerstone of Bryan's coaching philosophy is "Making It Fun". He stresses the importance of enthusiasm and positivity and believes it is as much the coach/parents' job to inspire and motivate as it is to teach proper tennis technique.

=== Criticism of the USTA ===
In 2012, a private letter written by Wayne Bryan on American junior tennis was published online. Bryan expressed concerns about USTA Player Development, calling it bureaucratic and authoritarian, citing the U10 mandate requiring all children ten and under (regardless of ability) to compete on miniature courts using lightweight "green dot" balls . Bryan mentions as harmful to American junior tennis the increasing number of NCAA college scholarships being awarded to foreign players and the attempt to nationalize coaching, rather than supporting existing player-coach relationships in the private sector. In the same letter, Bryan calls for increased spending transparency by the USTA, stating that the salaries of Patrick McEnroe and his staff should be made public.

A response by USTA Player Development General Manager Patrick McEnroe calling Bryan's analysis "full of holes" has led to an ongoing public debate about best practices.

== Personal life ==
Wayne Bryan is the author of the book "Raising Your Child To Be A Champion In Athletics, Arts and Academics", on his personal experiences as a parent of aspiring tennis players (ISBN 978-0806526607). He is a frequent emcee of tennis charity events and clinics.
