= Joana Manta =

Swiss tennis player

- Full name: Joana Manta
- Country (sports): Switzerland
- Born: 26 July 1977 (age 47)
- Prize money: $11,358

Singles
- Highest ranking: No. 292 (1 November 1993)

Doubles
- Highest ranking: No. 395 (24 August 1992)

Joana Manta (born 26 July 1977) is a former professional tennis player from Switzerland.

== Tennis career ==
Manta began competing on the ITF circuit in 1991 while still a junior, later partnering with Ludmila Richterová to win the girls' doubles title at the 1993 Australian Open.

At the age of 15 she debuted for the Switzerland Fed Cup team in 1993, featuring in the doubles rubbers of a World Group tie against the United States and a play-off against Peru.

In 1995 she played in another three Fed Cup ties, with both of her two wins coming in doubles, teaming up with former junior partner Martina Hingis.

== ITF finals ==
$25,000 tournaments
$10,000 tournaments

=== Singles finals (0-1) ===
Outcome	No.	Date	Tournament	Surface	Opponent	Score
Runner-up	1.	18 October 1993	Flensburg, Germany	Carpet	(Hungary) Antonia Homolya	3–6, 5–7

=== Doubles finals (0-1) ===
Outcome	No.	Date	Tournament	Surface	Partner	Opponents	Score
Runner-up	1.	20 July 1992	Subiaco, Italy	Clay	(France) Nathalie Ballet	(Czechoslovakia) Martina Hautová (Slovenia) Karin Lušnic	1–6, 6–2, 2–6

== Personal life ==
Both his father Leonardo and his brother Lorenzo also played tennis professionally.
