= Ethel Sutton Bruce =

English-born American tennis player (1881–1957)

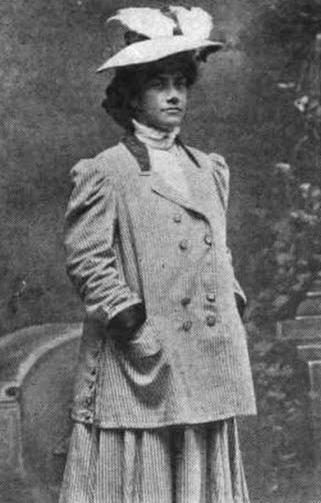
Ethel Sutton Bruce, from a 1908 publication.

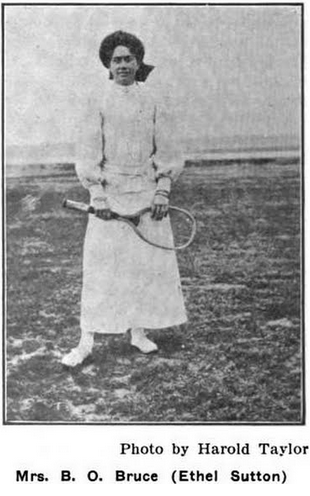
Ethel Sutton Bruce, from a 1910 publication.

Ethel Sutton Bruce (January 22, 1881 – June 18, 1957) was an English-born American tennis player.

== Early life ==
Ethel Mathilda Godfray Sutton was born in Portsmouth, England, the daughter of Adolphus DeGrouchy Sutton and Adeline Esther Godfray Sutton. Adolphus Sutton was a naval captain. The family moved to Pasadena, California when Ethel was a girl. Three of her sisters, May Sutton, Florence Sutton, and Violet Sutton, were also competitive tennis players.

== Career ==
Ethel Sutton often played against her sisters; together, the Suttons won every Southern California women's singles championship between 1899 and 1915. Ethel won the title in 1906, 1911, 1912, and 1913. Ethel also won titles in doubles and mixed doubles events.

Ethel Sutton Bruce wrote a series of articles about tennis for the San Francisco Call newspaper in 1913. She later co-authored a book, Tennis, Fundamentals and Timing (1938) with her husband. She also taught tennis in physical education classes for women at the University of California Los Angeles.

In 1947, all four Sutton sisters wore 1890s-style tennis costumes to play at a Santa Monica fundraiser for Children's Hospital Los Angeles.

== Personal life ==
Ethel Sutton married Robert O. Bruce; they had a son, Robert. She died in Santa Monica, California in 1957, aged 76 years.

Ethel Sutton Bruce's brother-in-law was tennis player Tom Bundy. She was the aunt of several tennis players of a younger generation, including Dorothy Cheney and John Doeg. In 1976, Ethel Sutton Bruce, Violet Sutton Hope-Doeg, and Florence Sutton were inducted into the Southern California Tennis Association Hall of Fame.
