= Hervé Grenier =

French tennis player

- Country (sports): France
- Born: 4 December 1967 (age 57); Montbrison, France
- Height: 6 ft 3 in (191 cm)

Singles
- Career record: 0–1
- Highest ranking: No. 443 (8 May 1995)

Grand Slam singles results
- French Open: Q1 (1995)

Doubles
- Highest ranking: No. 901 (30 Nov 1992)

Hervé Grenier (born 4 December 1967) is a French former professional tennis player.

Born and raised in Montbrison, Grenier turned professional in 1992 and made his only ATP Tour main draw appearance as a qualifier at the 1994 Grand Prix de Tennis de Lyon. He reached his career best singles world ranking of 443 in 1995 and featured that year in the qualifying draw for the French Open.

Grenier's son Hugo is a tennis player, currently competing on the ATP Tour. He is also the uncle of basketball player William Howard, who is the son of one of his sisters.
