= Francesc Montañés =

Spanish tennis player (born 1990)

- Full name: Francesc Montañés Roca
- Country (sports): Spain
- Residence: Barcelona, Spain
- Born: 9 January 1990 (age 36) Sant Carles de la Ràpita, Spain
- Height: 1.80 m (5 ft 11 in)
- Plays: Right-handed (two-handed backhand)
- Prize money: $7,928

Singles
- Career record: 0–0 (at ATP Tour level, Grand Slam level, and in Davis Cup)
- Career titles: 0
- Highest ranking: No. 577 (1 February 2016)

Doubles
- Career record: 0–1 (at ATP Tour level, Grand Slam level, and in Davis Cup)
- Career titles: 0
- Highest ranking: No. 460 (23 May 2016)

Francesc Montañés Roca (Spanish pronunciation: [fɾanˈθesk montaˈɲes ˈroka]; born 9 January 1990) is a retired Spanish tennis player and padel coach.

Montañés had a career high ATP singles ranking of 1186 achieved on 15 August 2011. He also had a career high ATP doubles ranking of 1075 achieved on 25 July 2011.

Montañés made his ATP main draw debut at the 2011 Grand Prix Hassan II in the doubles draw partnering his brother Albert.

As a junior player, in 2006, Montañés clinched the Spanish national tournament for under-15 boys, and took part in the Junior Davis Cup Finals held in Barcelona.

== ATP Challenger and ITF Futures Finals ==
=== Doubles: 1 (0–1) ===
Legend ATP Challenger (0–0) ITF Futures (0–1)	Finals by surface Hard (0–0) Clay (0–1) Grass (0–0) Carpet (0–0)

Result	W–L	Date	Tournament	Tier	Surface	Partner	Opponents	Score
Loss	0–1	Oct 2012	F2 Annaba, Algeria	ITF Futures	Clay	(Russia) Ronald Slobodchikov	(Canada) Steven Diez (Spain) Marc Giner	4–6, 2–6
