= Carlos Chávez (tennis) =

Guatemalan tennis player

- Country (sports): Guatemala
- Born: 21 November 1963 (age 61)

Singles
- Career record: 0–1 (Davis Cup)

Doubles
- Career record: 0–1 (Davis Cup)
Medal record
Central American and Caribbean Games
Silver medal – second place	1986 Santiago	Men's team
Bronze medal – third place	1986 Santiago	Men's singles

Carlos Chávez (born 21 November 1963) is a Guatemalan former tennis player.

Chávez was a singles bronze medalist at the 1986 Central American and Caribbean Games and also competed for Guatemala at the 1987 Pan American Games, where he made it through to the knockout stage of the singles event.

The eldest of four brothers to represent Guatemala in the Davis Cup, Chávez made his debut in a 1991 tie against the Eastern Caribbean team and lost a close singles rubber to John Maginley, 7–9 in the fifth set. Chávez's only other appearance came as a doubles player in 1994, partnering brother Daniel in a five-set loss to a pair from Colombia. His younger brothers Jacobo and Manuel have also played in the Davis Cup.
