= David Sherbeck =

American tennis player

Dave Sherbeck
- Full name: David Sherbeck
- Country (sports): United States
- Born: December 2, 1955 (age 70)

Grand Slam doubles results
- Wimbledon: 1R (1979)

Grand Slam mixed doubles results
- Wimbledon: QF (1979)
- US Open: 1R (1979)

David Sherbeck (born December 2, 1955) is an American former professional tennis player.

Sherbeck, the son of Fullerton College football coach Hal, grew up in Orange County, California and attended El Dorado High School. His younger brother, Eric Sherbeck, was a tennis player who competed professionally in the 1980s.

A graduate of the University of Utah, where he played from 1974 to 1978, Sherbeck featured briefly on the professional tour. Most notably he was a mixed doubles quarter-finalist at the 1979 Wimbledon Championships partnering Jane Stratton, another former University of Utah player.
