= Jermaine Jenkins =

American tennis coach

- Country (sports): United States
- Born: November 20, 1984 (age 41)
- Height: 5 ft 11 in (180 cm)

Singles
- Highest ranking: No. 1386 (September 15, 2008)

Doubles
- Highest ranking: No. 1210 (April 21, 2008)

Jermaine Jenkins (born November 20, 1984) is an American tennis coach for players such as Naomi Osaka, having previously been one of Venus Williams' hitting partners. He played collegiately for Clemson University and is the brother of Jarmere Jenkins.
