= Gilbert Nunns =

Canadian tennis player

- Country (sports): Canada
- Born: June 30, 1907; Leeds, England
- Died: July 16, 2001 (aged 94); Toronto, Canada

Singles

Grand Slam singles results
- US Open: 2R (1927)

Gilbert Nunns (June 30, 1907 – July 16, 2001) was a Canadian tennis player.

Born in Leeds, England, Nunns grew up in Canada and was intramural singles and doubles champion while at the University of Toronto. He won the singles title at the Ontario Championships on multiple occasions and was twice runner-up at the Canadian Championships. His career included Davis Cup appearances in 1927, 1933 and 1934, the latter as playing captain. He was Canada's top ranked player in 1930 and is a member of the Tennis Canada Hall of Fame.

Nunns was married to tennis player Beatrice Symons and they had four daughters who played collegiate tennis for the University of Toronto. One of their daughters, Brenda, was a Canadian Federation Cup player.

== See also ==
- List of Canada Davis Cup team representatives
