= Jim Macken (tennis) =

Canadian tennis player and administrator (1925–2009)

James Macken
- Full name: James Joseph Macken
- Country (sports): Canada
- Born: July 29, 1925; Montreal, Quebec
- Died: March 20, 2009 (aged 83); Richmond, British Columbia

Singles

Grand Slam singles results
- US Open: 2R (1946)

James Joseph Macken (July 29, 1925 – March 20, 2009) was a Canadian tennis player and administrator.

Born in Montreal, Quebec, Macken is the brother of tennis players Brendan and Patricia. At one stage, while Patricia occupied top spot in the Canadian women's rankings, he and Brendan formed the top two in the men's rankings.

Macken won the Canadian Championships doubles title in 1946 and represented the Canada Davis Cup team in a 1948 tie against Mexico, as a doubles player. On both occasions he partnered his brother Brendan. He won the NCAA team championship with William and Mary College in both 1947 and 1948.

Moving to Vancouver in 1951, Macken served two years as President of the British Columbia Lawn Tennis Association, before being elected President of the Canadian Lawn Tennis Association in 1964.

== See also ==
- List of Canada Davis Cup team representatives
