= Adli El Shafei II =

Egyptian tennis player (born 1973)

- Native name: عدلي الشافعي
- ITF name: Adly El Shafei
- Country (sports): Egypt
- Born: 1 November 1973 (age 51)

Singles
- Highest ranking: No. 1,071

Adli El-Shafei Junior (Arabic: عدلي الشافعي; born 1 November 1973) is an Egyptian tennis player who competed in the Davis Cup. He played 2 matches for Egypt in the Davis Cup. His career high in ATP singles ranking is number 1,071, which he achieved on 3 August 1992.
