= 1955 Wimbledon Championships – Mixed doubles =

Mixed doubles
- 1955 Wimbledon Championships

Final
- Champions: (United States) Vic Seixas (United States) Doris Hart
- Runners-up: (Argentina) Enrique Morea (United States) Louise Brough
- Score: 8–6, 2–6, 6–3

Details
- Draw: 80 (5Q)
- Seeds: 4

Events
Singles	men	women		boys	girls
Doubles	men	women	mixed	boys	girls
- Wimbledon Championships

Vic Seixas and Doris Hart successfully defended their title, defeating Enrique Morea and Louise Brough in the final, 8–6, 2–6, 6–3 to win the mixed doubles tennis title at the 1955 Wimbledon Championships.

== Seeds ==
1. (United States) Vic Seixas / (United States) Doris Hart (champions)
2. (Argentina) Enrique Morea / (United States) Louise Brough (final)
3. (United States) Ham Richardson / (United States) Darlene Hard (fourth round)
4. (Australia) Lew Hoad / (Australia) Jenny Hoad (semifinals)

Click on the seed number of a player to go to their draw section.

== Draw ==
Key

- Q = Qualifier
- WC = Wild card
- LL = Lucky loser
- Alt = Alternate
- ITF = ITF entry
- PR = Protected ranking
- SR = Special ranking
- SE = Special exempt
- JE = Junior exempt
- JR = Junior Accelerator Programme entrant
- CO = College Accelerator Programme entrant
- NG = Next Gen Accelerator Program entrant
- w/o = Walkover
- r = Retired
- d = Defaulted

=== Finals ===
Quarterfinals
2	(Argentina) Enrique Morea (United States) Louise Brough	7	6
LL	(United Kingdom) Pat Sherwood (South Africa) Toots Watermeyer	5	3
(United States) Hugh Stewart (West Germany) Erika Vollmer	4	5
(Australia) Neale Fraser (Australia) Beryl Penrose	6	7
(Italy) Orlando Sirola (Italy) Lea Pericoli	2	2
4	(Australia) Lew Hoad (Australia) Jenny Hoad	6	6
(Australia) Bill Gilmour (Australia) Daphne Seeney	3	2
1	(United States) Vic Seixas (United States) Doris Hart	6	6

Semifinals
2	(Argentina) Enrique Morea (United States) Louise Brough	7	6	6
(Australia) Neale Fraser (Australia) Beryl Penrose	9	4	4
4	(Australia) Lew Hoad (Australia) Jenny Hoad	3	7
1	(United States) Vic Seixas (United States) Doris Hart	6	9

Final
2	(Argentina) Enrique Morea (United States) Louise Brough	6	6	3
1	(United States) Vic Seixas (United States) Doris Hart	8	2	6

=== Top half ===
==== Section 1 ====
First round

Second round
2	(Argentina) Enrique Morea (United States) Louise Brough	6	6
(Denmark) Søren Højberg (France) Suzanne Schmitt	4	2
(Spain) José María Draper (United Kingdom) Margaret Grace	6	5
(India) Ramanathan Krishnan (India) Rita Davar	8	7
(United Kingdom) Claude Lister (United Kingdom) Pearl Panton	6	6
Q	(United Kingdom) FB Webb (United Kingdom) Mrs FB Webb	2	4
(Chile) Andrés Hammersley (United Kingdom) Viola White	1	6
(France) Marc Lasry (France) Béatrice de Chambure	6	8

Third round
2	(Argentina) E Morea (United States) L Brough	6	6
(India) R Krishnan (India) R Davar	3	4
(United Kingdom) C Lister (United Kingdom) P Panton	9	6
(France) M Lasry (France) B de Chambure	7	3

Fourth round
2	(Argentina) E Morea (United States) L Brough	6	6
(United Kingdom) C Lister (United Kingdom) P Panton	1	4

==== Section 2 ====
First round

Second round
(South Africa) Owen Williams (United Kingdom) Mary Halford	6	6
(United Kingdom) Mike Davies (United Kingdom) Doreen Spiers	2	2
(United States) Sidney Schwartz (United States) Dorothy Knode	6	6
(Belgium) Jacques Peten (United Kingdom) Diane Midgley	1	1
LL	(United Kingdom) Pat Sherwood (South Africa) Toots Watermeyer	6	6
(United Kingdom) Alan Mills (United Kingdom) Rita Bentley	0	4
(Belgium) Philippe Washer (United States) Barbara Davidson	6	5^{r}
(Republic of Ireland) Joe Hackett (Republic of Ireland) Audrey Clarke	3	3

Third round
(South Africa) O Williams (United Kingdom) M Halford	5	6	3
(United States) S Schwartz (United States) D Knode	7	4	6
LL	(United Kingdom) P Sherwood (South Africa) T Watermeyer	6	7
(Republic of Ireland) J Hackett (Republic of Ireland) A Clarke	0	5

Fourth round
(United States) S Schwartz (United States) D Knode	6	3	4
LL	(United Kingdom) P Sherwood (South Africa) T Watermeyer	4	6	6

==== Section 3 ====
First round

Second round
3	(United States) Ham Richardson (United States) Darlene Hard	7	6
(South Africa) Abe Segal (Bermuda) Heather Brewer	5	4
(Australia) Adrian Quist (Australia) Mary Carter	6	6
(Spain) Emilio Martínez (Spain) María Josefa de Riba	3	1
(Australia) George Worthington (United Kingdom) Pat Ward	7	4	2
(United States) Hugh Stewart (West Germany) Erika Vollmer	5	6	6
(United States) Bob Kelleher (United States) Grace Kelleher	6	5	3
(France) Jean-Claude Molinari (United States) Gloria Butler	3	7	6

Third round
3	(United States) H Richardson (United States) D Hard	6	6
(Australia) A Quist (Australia) M Carter	4	1
(United States) H Stewart (West Germany) E Vollmer	6	6
(France) J-C Molinari (United States) G Butler	4	1

Fourth round
3	(United States) H Richardson (United States) D Hard	6	1	5
(United States) H Stewart (West Germany) E Vollmer	3	6	7

==== Section 4 ====
First round
(France) Robert Haillet (France) Annie Haillet	6	6
(Spain) Jaime Bartrolí (New Zealand) Lynne Luxton	2	3
(Argentina) Ernesto della Paolera (Australia) DM Wallis	5	1
Q	(Australia) Arthur Marshall (United Kingdom) Pauline Titchener	7	6
(United States) Bob Perry (Australia) Loris Nichols	0	2
(United Kingdom) Roger Becker (United Kingdom) Elaine Watson	6	6
(United Kingdom) Tommy Anderson (United Kingdom) Heather Macfarlane	6	8
(Trinidad and Tobago) Ian McDonald (United Kingdom) Rita Drobný	1	6
LL	(South Africa) Gordon Forbes (United Kingdom) Jennifer Middleton	w/o
(Italy) Nicola Pietrangeli (Italy) Nicla Migliori
(United Kingdom) Geoff Ward (United Kingdom) Vera Thomas	7	6	6
(France) Philippe Chatrier (France) Susan Chatrier	9	1	4
(South Africa) Russell Seymour (South Africa) Hazel Redick-Smith	4	6	8
(Argentina) Alejo Russell (Australia) Nell Hopman	6	4	6
(Australia) Neale Fraser (Australia) Beryl Penrose	6	6
Q	(South Africa) Cyril Botha (South Africa) Helen Pascoe	0	4

Second round
(France) R Haillet (France) A Haillet	6	7
Q	(Australia) A Marshall (United Kingdom) P Titchener	1	5
(United Kingdom) R Becker (United Kingdom) E Watson	6	8
(United Kingdom) T Anderson (United Kingdom) H Macfarlane	2	6
(Italy) N Pietrangeli (Italy) N Migliori	6	4	6
(United Kingdom) G Ward (United Kingdom) V Thomas	4	6	4
(South Africa) R Seymour (South Africa) H Redick-Smith	1	6	5
(Australia) N Fraser (Australia) B Penrose	6	3	7

Third round
(France) R Haillet (France) A Haillet	6	1	4
(United Kingdom) R Becker (United Kingdom) E Watson	3	6	6
(Italy) N Pietrangeli (Italy) N Migliori	3	2
(Australia) N Fraser (Australia) B Penrose	6	6

Fourth round
(United Kingdom) R Becker (United Kingdom) E Watson	1	6
(Australia) N Fraser (Australia) B Penrose	6	8

=== Bottom half ===
==== Section 5 ====
First round
(Netherlands) Fred Dehnert (Netherlands) Fenny ten Bosch	7	2
(United Kingdom) Don Butler (United Kingdom) Rosemary Bulleid	9	6
(United Kingdom) Gerry Oakley (United Kingdom) Billie Woodgate	7	6
(Venezuela) Isaías Pimentel (United Kingdom) Jean Bee	5	3
(Italy) Orlando Sirola (Italy) Lea Pericoli	6	6
(Pakistan) Khwaja Saeed (United Kingdom) Sue Waters	3	4
(Australia) Ashley Cooper (United Kingdom) Mary Eyre	4	6	6
Q	(Australia) Dick Potter (Australia) Beth Ruffin	6	4	3
(Australia) Mal Anderson (Australia) Fay Muller	5	6	6
(United Kingdom) John Barrett (Spain) Mary Terán de Weiss	7	2	4
(Switzerland) René Buser (Switzerland) Ruth Kaufmann	4	0
(South Africa) Trevor Fancutt (United Kingdom) Sheila Griffin	6	6
(Sweden) Sven Davidson (United Kingdom) Angela Buxton	6	6	6
(Austria) Freddie Huber (Austria) Elizabeth Broz	1	8	2
(Australia) Bob Howe (United Kingdom) Anne Shilcock	6	6
(Socialist Federal Republic of Yugoslavia) Stefán László (Austria) Ilse Schuh-Proxauf	3	2

Second round
(United Kingdom) D Butler (United Kingdom) R Bulleid	6	4	2
(United Kingdom) G Oakley (United Kingdom) R Woodgate	2	6	6
(Italy) O Sirola (Italy) L Pericoli	6	4	8
(Australia) A Cooper (United Kingdom) M Eyre	4	6	6
(Australia) M Anderson (Australia) F Muller	5	1
(South Africa) T Fancutt (United Kingdom) S Griffin	7	6
(Sweden) S Davidson (United Kingdom) A Buxton	1	6	7
(Australia) R Howe (United Kingdom) A Shilcock	6	3	5

Third round
(United Kingdom) G Oakley (United Kingdom) R Woodgate	5	2
(Italy) O Sirola (Italy) L Pericoli	7	6
(South Africa) T Fancutt (United Kingdom) S Griffin	14	3	1
(Sweden) S Davidson (United Kingdom) A Buxton	12	6	6

Fourth round
(Italy) O Sirola (Italy) L Pericoli	3	6	6
(Sweden) S Davidson (United Kingdom) A Buxton	6	4	4

==== Section 6 ====
First round

Second round
(Chile) Luis Ayala (United States) Lois Felix
(Belgium) Gino Mezzi (Belgium) Christiane Mercelis	w/o
(United Kingdom) Tony Pickard (United Kingdom) Pat Harrison	6	7	6
(United Kingdom) Billy Knight (United Kingdom) Shirley Bloomer	8	5	8
(United Kingdom) Ivor Warwick (United Kingdom) Valerie Lewis	3	6	2
(United States) Pablo Eisenberg (United States) Arvilla McGuire	6	4	6
(Sweden) Torsten Johansson (Sweden) Birgit Gullbrandsson-Sandén	2	5
4	(Australia) Lew Hoad (Australia) Jenny Hoad	6	7

Third round
(Chile) L Ayala (United States) L Felix	6	10
(United Kingdom) W Knight (United Kingdom) S Bloomer	4	8
(United States) P Eisenberg (United States) A McGuire	2	0
4	(Australia) L Hoad (Australia) J Hoad	6	6

Fourth round
(Chile) L Ayala (United States) L Felix	4	4
4	(Australia) L Hoad (Australia) J Hoad	6	6

==== Section 7 ====
First round

Second round
(France) Jean Borotra (France) Ginette Bucaille	3	6	6
(South Africa) Ian Vermaak (South Africa) Dora Kilian	6	4	4
(Iran) Matthew Mohtadi (United Kingdom) Barbara Knapp	5	2
(Australia) Cedric Mason (United Kingdom) Pat Hird	7	6
(Hungary) István Gulyás (France) Françoise Lemal	6	6
(United Kingdom) Eric Filby (United States) Kay Hubbell	2	3
(Australia) Bill Gilmour (Australia) Daphne Seeney	5	6	6
(Poland) Czesław Spychała (United Kingdom) Bea Walter	7	2	4

Third round
(France) J Borotra (France) G Bucaille	6	4	6
(Australia) C Mason (United Kingdom) P Hird	4	6	2
(Hungary) I Gulyás (France) F Lemal	1	4
(Australia) W Gilmour (Australia) D Seeney	6	6

Fourth round
(France) J Borotra (France) G Bucaille	8	0
(Australia) W Gilmour (Australia) D Seeney	10	6

==== Section 8 ====
First round

Second round
(United Kingdom) Geoffrey Paish (United Kingdom) Lorna Cawthorn	6	9
(Hungary) István Sikorszki (Hungary) Zsuzsa Körmöczy	1	7
(United Kingdom) Tony Dawes (United Kingdom) Betty Dawes	1	6	6
(United Kingdom) Colin Hannam (United Kingdom) Georgie Woodgate	6	4	4
(United States) John Fleitz (United States) Beverly Fleitz	7	6
(Netherlands) Hans van Dalsum (United Kingdom) Gem Hoahing	5	3
(India) Naresh Kumar (United Kingdom) Freda Hammersley	2	5
1	(United States) Vic Seixas (United States) Doris Hart	6	7

Third round
(United Kingdom) G Paish (United Kingdom) L Cawthorn	6	6
(United Kingdom) A Dawes (United Kingdom) E Dawes	4	1
(United States) J Fleitz (United States) B Fleitz	1	1
1	(United States) V Seixas (United States) D Hart	6	6

Fourth round
(United Kingdom) G Paish (United Kingdom) L Cawthorn	3	2
1	(United States) V Seixas (United States) D Hart	6	6
