= 1955 in tennis =

This page covers all the important events in the sport of tennis in 1955. It provides the results of notable tournaments throughout the year on both the men's and women's ILTF tennis circuits.

== Australian Open ==
Category	Champion(s)	Finalist(s)	Score
Men's singles	(Australia) Ken Rosewall	(Australia) Lew Hoad	9–7, 6–4, 6–4
Women's singles	(Australia) Beryl Penrose	(Australia) Thelma Coyne Long	6–4, 6–3
Men's doubles	(United States) Vic Seixas (United States) Tony Trabert	(Australia) Lew Hoad (Australia) Ken Rosewall	6–3, 6–2, 2–6, 3–6, 6–1
Women's doubles	(Australia) Mary Bevis Hawton (Australia) Beryl Penrose	(Australia) Nell Hall Hopman (Australia) Gwen Thiele	7–5, 6–1
Mixed doubles	(Australia) Thelma Coyne Long (Australia) George Worthington	(Australia) Jenny Staley (Australia) Lew Hoad	6–2, 6–1

== French Open ==
Category	Champion(s)	Finalist(s)	Score
Men's singles	(United States) Tony Trabert	(Sweden) Sven Davidson	2–6, 6–1, 6–4, 6–2
Women's singles	(United Kingdom) Angela Mortimer	(United States) Dorothy Knode	2–6, 7–5, 10–8
Men's doubles	(United States) Vic Seixas (United States) Tony Trabert	(Italy) Nicola Pietrangeli (Italy) Orlando Sirola	6–1, 4–6, 6–2, 6–4
Women's doubles	(United States) Beverly Baker Fleitz (United States) Darlene Hard	(United Kingdom) Shirley Bloomer (United Kingdom) Patricia Ward	7–5, 6–8, 13–11
Mixed doubles	(United States) Darlene Hard (South Africa) Gordon Forbes	(Australia) Jenny Staley (Chile) Luis Ayala	5–7, 6–1, 6–2

== Wimbledon ==
Category	Champion(s)	Finalist(s)	Score
Men's singles	(United States) Tony Trabert	(Denmark) Kurt Nielsen	6–3, 7–5, 6–1
Women's singles	(United States) Louise Brough	(United States) Beverly Fleitz	7–5, 8–6
Men's doubles	(Australia) Rex Hartwig (Australia) Lew Hoad	(Australia) Neale Fraser (Australia) Ken Rosewall	7–5, 6–4, 6–3
Women's doubles	(United Kingdom) Angela Mortimer (United Kingdom) Anne Shilcock	(United Kingdom) Shirley Bloomer (United Kingdom) Patricia Ward	7–5, 6–1
Mixed doubles	(United States) Vic Seixas (United States) Doris Hart	(Argentina) Enrique Morea (United States) Louise Brough	8–6, 2–6, 6–3

== US Open ==
Category	Champion(s)	Finalist(s)	Score
Men's singles	(United States) Tony Trabert	(Australia) Ken Rosewall	9–7, 6–3, 6–3
Women's singles	(United States) Doris Hart	(United Kingdom) Patricia Ward	6–4, 6–2
Men's doubles	(Japan) Kosei Kamo (Japan) Atsushi Miyagi	(United States) Gerald Moss (United States) Bill Quillian	6–2, 6–3, 3–6, 1–6, 6–4
Women's doubles	(United States) Louise Brough (United States) Margaret Osborne duPont	(United States) Shirley Fry (United States) Doris Hart	6–3, 1–6, 6–3
Mixed doubles	(United States) Doris Hart (United States) Vic Seixas	(United States) Shirley Fry (United States) Gardnar Mulloy	7–5, 5–7, 6–2
