= 1953 Wimbledon Championships – Men's doubles =

Men's doubles
- 1953 Wimbledon Championships

Final
- Champions: (Australia) Lew Hoad (Australia) Ken Rosewall
- Runners-up: (Australia) Rex Hartwig (Australia) Mervyn Rose
- Score: 6–4, 7–5, 4–6, 7–5

Details
- Draw: 64 (5Q)
- Seeds: 4

Events
Singles	men	women		boys	girls
Doubles	men	women	mixed	boys	girls
- Wimbledon Championships

Ken McGregor and Frank Sedgman were the defending champions, but were ineligible to compete after turning professional.

Lew Hoad and Ken Rosewall defeated Rex Hartwig and Mervyn Rose in the final, 6–4, 7–5, 4–6, 7–5 to win the gentlemen's doubles tennis title at the 1953 Wimbledon Championship.

== Seeds ==
1. (Australia) Lew Hoad / (Australia) Ken Rosewall (champions)
2. (United States) Gardnar Mulloy / (United States) Vic Seixas (semifinals)
3. (Australia) Rex Hartwig / (Australia) Mervyn Rose (final)
4. (Egypt) Jaroslav Drobný / (United States) Budge Patty (third round)

Click on the seed number of a player to go to their draw section.

== Draw ==
Key

- Q = Qualifier
- WC = Wild card
- LL = Lucky loser
- Alt = Alternate
- ITF = ITF entry
- PR = Protected ranking
- SR = Special ranking
- SE = Special exempt
- JE = Junior exempt
- JR = Junior Accelerator Programme entrant
- CO = College Accelerator Programme entrant
- NG = Next Gen Accelerator Program entrant
- w/o = Walkover
- r = Retired
- d = Defaulted

=== Finals ===
Quarterfinals
1	(Australia) Lew Hoad (Australia) Ken Rosewall	6	6	5	6
(Austria) Freddie Huber (Austria) Hans Redl	3	2	7	4
(Belgium) Jacques Brichant (Belgium) Philippe Washer	6	6	6
(Poland) Władysław Skonecki (Sweden) Staffan Stockenberg	2	1	2
(United States) Hugh Stewart (Brazil) Armando Vieira	1	3	6	5
3	(Australia) Rex Hartwig (Australia) Mervyn Rose	6	6	3	7
(India) Naresh Kumar (India) Narendra Nath	2	1	8
2	(United States) Gardnar Mulloy (United States) Vic Seixas	6	6	10

Semifinals
1	(Australia) Lew Hoad (Australia) Ken Rosewall	4	6	6	3	6
(Belgium) Jacques Brichant (Belgium) Philippe Washer	6	0	4	6	1
3	(Australia) Rex Hartwig (Australia) Mervyn Rose	14	6	6	6
2	(United States) Gardnar Mulloy (United States) Vic Seixas	16	3	3	4

Final
1	(Australia) Lew Hoad (Australia) Ken Rosewall	6	7	4	7
3	(Australia) Rex Hartwig (Australia) Mervyn Rose	4	5	6	5

=== Top half ===
==== Section 1 ====
First round
1	(Australia) Lew Hoad (Australia) Ken Rosewall	6	6	6
(Switzerland) René Buser (Belgium) Ivan Devroe	1	0	3
(Socialist Federal Republic of Yugoslavia) Josip Palada (Socialist Federal Republic of Yugoslavia) Vladimir Petrović	7	6	6
(United Kingdom) Clive Bernstein (Belgium) Jacques Peten	5	3	3
(Colombia) O Rodriguez (Colombia) Mario Zeppenfeldt	w/o
(Republic of Ireland) Cyril Kemp (Iran) Matthew Mohtadi
(Hungary) Antal Jancsó (Hungary) István Sikorszki	3	2	5
(Sweden) Sven Davidson (United States) Art Larsen	6	6	7
(United Kingdom) Roger Becker (United Kingdom) Gerry Oakley	6	8	2	3	4
(Austria) Freddie Huber (Austria) Hans Redl	3	6	6	6	6
(Republic of Ireland) Vivian Gotto (Republic of Ireland) Jim McArdle	5	3	2
(Dominion of Ceylon) Donald Fonseka (Dominion of Ceylon) Doug Scharenguivel	7	6	6
(Denmark) Kurt Nielsen (Denmark) Torben Ulrich	6	6	6
(Sweden) Lennart Bergelin (Sweden) Torsten Johansson	3	4	4
(United States) Tut Bartzen (United States) Grant Golden	6	6	6
Q	(United Kingdom) Geoff Ward (United Kingdom) John Ward	3	4	3

Second round
1	(Australia) L Hoad (Australia) K Rosewall	6	6	6
(Socialist Federal Republic of Yugoslavia) J Palada (Socialist Federal Republic of Yugoslavia) V Petrović	2	2	4
(Republic of Ireland) C Kemp (Iran) M Mohtadi	3	3	5
(Sweden) S Davidson (United States) A Larsen	6	6	7
(Austria) A Huber (Austria) H Redl	6	3	6	6
(Dominion of Ceylon) D Fonseka (Dominion of Ceylon) D Scharenguivel	1	6	3	4
(Denmark) K Nielsen (Denmark) T Ulrich	6	6	9	6
(United States) B Bartzen (United States) G Golden	8	3	7	3

Third round
1	(Australia) L Hoad (Australia) K Rosewall	6	6	6
(Sweden) S Davidson (United States) A Larsen	1	4	2
(Austria) A Huber (Austria) H Redl	3	6	6	9
(Denmark) K Nielsen (Denmark) T Ulrich	6	3	4	7

Quarterfinals
1	(Australia) L Hoad (Australia) K Rosewall	6	6	5	6
(Austria) A Huber (Austria) H Redl	3	2	7	4

==== Section 2 ====
First round
3	(Egypt) Jaroslav Drobný (United States) Budge Patty	6	6	6
(United Kingdom) Henry Billington (United Kingdom) Don Butler	3	2	2
(Uruguay) Eduardo Argon (Italy) Gianni Clerici	2	3	1
(Australia) Jack Arkinstall (Australia) Barry Green	6	6	6
(France) Bernard Destremau (France) Jean-Claude Molinari	2	5	1
(Belgium) Jacques Brichant (Belgium) Philippe Washer	6	7	6
(South Africa) Johann Kupferburger (South Africa) Ian Vermaak	8	6	7
(Spain) Jaime Bartrolí (Spain) Carlos Ferrer	6	3	5
Q	(United Kingdom) Stan Clark (United Kingdom) Cliff Hovell	3	2	3
(France) Robert Abdesselam (France) Jean Borotra	6	6	6
(United States) John Ager (United States) Malcolm Fox	5	3	4
(France) Jean-Noël Grinda (Australia) Harry Hopman	7	6	6
(Poland) Władysław Skonecki (Sweden) Staffan Stockenberg	6	6	7
(Poland) Czesław Spychała (Poland) Ignacy Tłoczyński	3	0	5
(United Kingdom) Colin Hannam (United Kingdom) Tony Pickard	7	7	6
(United Kingdom) Peter Anderson (United Kingdom) Edmund David	5	5	3

Second round
3	(Egypt) J Drobný (United States) J Patty	6	7	6	6
(Australia) J Arkinstall (Australia) B Green	3	9	4	2
(Belgium) J Brichant (Belgium) P Washer	8	8	10
(South Africa) J Kupferburger (South Africa) I Vermaak	6	6	8
(France) R Abdesselam (France) J Borotra	2	7	5	5
(France) J-N Grinda (Australia) H Hopman	6	5	7	7
(Poland) W Skonecki (Sweden) S Stockenberg	6	6	5	6
(United Kingdom) C Hannam (United Kingdom) A Pickard	4	3	7	4

Third round
3	(Egypt) J Drobný (United States) J Patty	w/o
(Belgium) J Brichant (Belgium) P Washer
(France) J-N Grinda (Australia) H Hopman	3	4	7
(Poland) W Skonecki (Sweden) S Stockenberg	6	6	9

Quarterfinals
(Belgium) J Brichant (Belgium) P Washer	6	6	6
(Poland) W Skonecki (Sweden) S Stockenberg	2	1	2

=== Bottom half ===
==== Section 3 ====
First round
(Denmark) Søren Højberg (Denmark) Jørgen Ulrich	2	2	6
(United Kingdom) Billy Knight (United Kingdom) Bobby Wilson	6	6	8
(United Kingdom) Douglas Snart (Netherlands) Boebi van Meegeren	1	3	4
Q	(United Kingdom) Eric Bulmer (United Kingdom) Reg Kaley	6	6	6
(Southern Rhodesia) Don Black (United Kingdom) Eric Filby	4	3	4
(United States) Hugh Stewart (Brazil) Armando Vieira	6	6	6
(Australia) Ian Ayre (Australia) Clive Wilderspin	7	4	6	3	7
(West Germany) Ernst Buchholz (West Germany) Horst Hermann	5	6	2	6	5
(United Kingdom) JM Brown (Hong Kong) Edwin Tsai	1	1	3
(Argentina) Enrique Morea (Australia) George Worthington	6	6	6
(South Africa) Russell Seymour (South Africa) Bryan Woodroffe	6	6	15
(France) Gérard Pilet (France) Jacques Thomas	3	3	13
(Italy) Fausto Gardini (Italy) Giuseppe Merlo	6	6	4	6
(United Kingdom) Peter Hare (United Kingdom) Howard Walton	2	1	6	2
(United Kingdom) Tim Lewis (Trinidad and Tobago) Ian McDonald	3	4	1
3	(Australia) Rex Hartwig (Australia) Mervyn Rose	6	6	6

Second round
(United Kingdom) W Knight (United Kingdom) R Wilson	6	7	9
(United Kingdom) E Bulmer (United Kingdom) R Kaley	3	5	7
(United States) H Stewart (Brazil) A Vieira	4	16	7	7
(Australia) I Ayre (Australia) C Wilderspin	6	14	5	5
(Argentina) E Morea (Australia) G Worthington	5	7	7	6
(South Africa) R Seymour (South Africa) B Woodroffe	7	5	5	4
(Italy) F Gardini (Italy) G Merlo	1	4	1
3	(Australia) R Hartwig (Australia) M Rose	6	6	6

Third round
(United Kingdom) W Knight (United Kingdom) R Wilson	4	5	7
(United States) H Stewart (Brazil) A Vieira	6	7	9
(Argentina) E Morea (Australia) G Worthington	6	4	4
3	(Australia) R Hartwig (Australia) M Rose	8	6	6

Quarterfinals
(United States) H Stewart (Brazil) A Vieira	1	3	6	5
3	(Australia) R Hartwig (Australia) M Rose	6	6	3	7

==== Section 4 ====
First round
(Republic of Ireland) Joe Hackett (Republic of Ireland) Guy Jackson	6	6	7	7
(Belgium) Pierre Geelhand de Merxem (Belgium) Gino Mezzi	4	3	9	5
(Netherlands) Fred Dehnert (Netherlands) Hans van Dalsum	3	7	6	4
(United Kingdom) Headley Baxter (United Kingdom) Claude Lister	6	9	3	6
(Hungary) József Asbóth (Hungary) Frigyes Bujtor	6	6	4	6
Q	(United Kingdom) Bernard Crouch (United Kingdom) Gerry Piercy	4	3	6	3
(United Kingdom) Tommy Anderson (United Kingdom) Ron Statham	5	0	1
(India) Naresh Kumar (India) Narendra Nath	7	6	6
(France) Philippe Chatrier (France) Gil de Kermadec	5	6	7	7
(United Kingdom) Malcolm Gracie (United Kingdom) Ivor Warwick	7	3	5	5
(United Kingdom) John Barrett (United Kingdom) John Horn	6	1	1	2
(Philippines) Felicisimo Ampon (Philippines) Raymundo Deyro	4	6	6	6
(United Kingdom) Colin Baxter (United Kingdom) Ian Campbell	7	4	3
(United Kingdom) Bob Lee (United Kingdom) Tony Starte	9	6	6
(United Kingdom) Tony Mottram (United Kingdom) Geoffrey Paish	6	3	4	6	4
2	(United States) Gardnar Mulloy (United States) Vic Seixas	4	6	6	4	6

Second round
(Republic of Ireland) J Hackett (Republic of Ireland) G Jackson	4	6	4	6	6
(United Kingdom) H Baxter (United Kingdom) C Lister	6	4	6	3	3
(Hungary) J Asbóth (Hungary) F Bujtor	1	5	6	1
(India) N Kumar (India) N Nath	6	7	3	6
(France) P Chatrier (France) G de Kermadec	5	2	2
(Philippines) F Ampon (Philippines) R Deyro	7	6	6
(United Kingdom) R Lee (United Kingdom) A Starte	5	5	4
2	(United States) G Mulloy (United States) V Seixas	7	7	6

Third round
(Republic of Ireland) J Hackett (Republic of Ireland) G Jackson	4	1	1
(India) N Kumar (India) N Nath	6	6	6
(Philippines) F Ampon (Philippines) R Deyro	3	3	2
2	(United States) G Mulloy (United States) V Seixas	6	6	6

Quarterfinals
(India) N Kumar (India) N Nath	2	1	8
2	(United States) G Mulloy (United States) V Seixas	6	6	10
