= 1955 Wimbledon Championships – Women's singles =

Women's singles
- 1955 Wimbledon Championships

Final
- Champion: (United States) Louise Brough
- Runner-up: (United States) Beverly Fleitz
- Score: 7–5, 8–6

Details
- Draw: 96 (10 Q )
- Seeds: 8

Events
Singles	men	women		boys	girls
Doubles	men	women	mixed	boys	girls
← 1954 ·	Wimbledon Championships	· 1956 →

Louise Brough defeated Beverly Fleitz in the final, 7–5, 8–6 to win the ladies' singles tennis title at the 1955 Wimbledon Championships. Maureen Connolly was the defending champion, but withdrew after breaking her leg.

== Seeds ==
1. (United States) Doris Hart (semifinals)
2. (United States) Louise Brough (champion)
3. (United States) Beverly Fleitz (final)
4. (United Kingdom) Angela Mortimer (second round)
5. (United States) Dorothy Knode (quarterfinals)
6. (United States) Darlene Hard (semifinals)
7. (Australia) Beryl Penrose (quarterfinals)
8. (United Kingdom) Angela Buxton (quarterfinals)

Click on the seed number of a player to go to their draw section.

== Draw ==
=== Key ===
- Q = Qualifier
- WC = Wild card
- LL = Lucky loser
- Alt = Alternate
- SE = Special exempt
- PR = Protected ranking
- ITF = ITF entry
- JE = Junior exempt
- w/o = Walkover
- r = Retired
- d = Defaulted
- SR = Special ranking

=== Finals ===
Quarterfinals
1	(United States) Doris Hart	6	6
5	(United States) Dorothy Knode	4	3
3	(United States) Beverly Fleitz	6	6
8	(United Kingdom) Angela Buxton	2	2
6	(United States) Darlene Hard	6	6
(Hungary) Zsuzsa Körmöczy	2	3
7	(Australia) Beryl Penrose	2	0
2	(United States) Louise Brough	6	6

Semifinals
1	(United States) Doris Hart	3	0
3	(United States) Beverly Fleitz	6	6
6	(United States) Darlene Hard	3	6
2	(United States) Louise Brough	6	8

Final
3	(United States) Beverly Fleitz	5	6
2	(United States) Louise Brough	7	8

=== Top half ===
==== Section 1 ====
First round

Second round
1	(United States) Doris Hart	6	6
(Australia) Nell Hopman	1	0
(United States) Kay Hubbell	2	1
(South Africa) Dora Kilian	6	6
(United Kingdom) Margot Parker	6	6
(Republic of Ireland) Audrey Clarke	1	2
(Italy) Lea Pericoli	7	1	2
(Spain) María Josefa de Riba	5	6	6

Third round
1	(United States) D Hart	6	6
(South Africa) D Kilian	2	1
(United Kingdom) M Parker	2	4
(Spain) MJ de Riba	6	6

Fourth round
1	(United States) D Hart	6	6
(Spain) MJ de Riba	1	3

==== Section 2 ====
First round

Second round
5	(United States) Dorothy Knode	6	2	7
(Australia) Fay Muller	4	6	5
(United Kingdom) Kathleen Stott	4	6	3
(West Germany) Margot Dittmeyer	6	1	6
(United Kingdom) Heather Macfarlane	3	3
(United Kingdom) Shirley Bloomer	6	6
(United Kingdom) Valerie Lewis	6	6
(Austria) Anneliese Schuh-Proxauf	2	2

Third round
5	(United States) D Knode	6	4	6
(West Germany) M Dittmeyer	3	6	3
(United Kingdom) S Bloomer	6	6
(United Kingdom) V Lewis	4	1

Fourth round
5	(United States) D Knode	6	6
(United Kingdom) S Bloomer	2	2

==== Section 3 ====
First round
3	(United States) Beverly Fleitz	6	6
(West Germany) Inge Pohmann	0	2
(United Kingdom) Billie Woodgate	1	6	6
(United Kingdom) Pat Hird	6	4	1
(France) Suzanne Schmitt	6	6
(United Kingdom) Valerie Pitt	3	0
(United Kingdom) Doreen Spiers	3	6	6
(United Kingdom) Peggy Dawson-Scott	6	2	4
Q	(United Kingdom) Joan MacLeod	1	1
(France) Susan Chatrier	6	6
(Belgium) Poucette Coessens	3	2
Q	(United Kingdom) Norma Kemsey-Bourne	6	6
(United Kingdom) Lorna Cawthorn	4	4
(United Kingdom) Rita Bentley	6	6
(Sweden) Birgit Gullbrandsson-Sandén	6	10	4
(United Kingdom) Jean Knight	3	12	6

Second round
3	(United States) B Fleitz	6	6
(United Kingdom) R Woodgate	3	1
(France) S Schmitt	4	1
(United Kingdom) D Spiers	6	6
(France) S Chatrier	6	6
Q	(United Kingdom) N Kemsey-Bourne	1	2
(United Kingdom) R Bentley	3	2
(United Kingdom) J Knight	6	6

Third round
3	(United States) B Fleitz	6	6
(United Kingdom) D Spiers	4	1
(France) S Chatrier	6	6
(United Kingdom) J Knight	2	0

Fourth round
3	(United States) B Fleitz	6	6
(France) S Chatrier	3	0

==== Section 4 ====
First round
8	(United Kingdom) Angela Buxton
(United Kingdom) Vera Thomas	w/o
(United Kingdom) Gem Hoahing	3	5
(United States) Lois Felix	6	7
Q	(United Kingdom) Joan Quelch	1	1
(United Kingdom) Hazel Cheadle	6	6
(United Kingdom) Sue Waters	6	13
(United Kingdom) Jean Bee	3	11
(Australia) Alison Baker	2	0
(Australia) Loris Nichols	6	6
(South Africa) Helen Pascoe	6	4	6
(Norway) Ida Wrede-Holm	4	6	1
(United States) Arvilla McGuire	5	8	5
(Australia) Jenny Hoad	7	6	7
LL	(United Kingdom) Anne Price	11	4
Q	(United Kingdom) Anthea Gibb	13	6

Second round
8	(United Kingdom) A Buxton	5	6	6
(United States) L Felix	7	4	1
(United Kingdom) H Cheadle	6	4	6
(United Kingdom) S Waters	2	6	4
(Australia) L Nichols	3	6	6
(South Africa) H Pascoe	6	4	3
(Australia) J Hoad	6	3	6
Q	(United Kingdom) A Gibb	1	6	3

Third round
8	(United Kingdom) A Buxton	6	6
(United Kingdom) H Cheadle	4	3
(Australia) L Nichols	6	3	3
(Australia) J Hoad	4	6	6

Fourth round
8	(United Kingdom) A Buxton	6	6
(Australia) J Hoad	1	0

=== Bottom half ===
==== Section 5 ====
First round
(United Kingdom) Pat Harrison	5	6	6
(United Kingdom) Barbara Knapp	7	4	3
Q	(United Kingdom) Wendy Morris	1	3
(Netherlands) Fenny ten Bosch	6	6
(United Kingdom) Pearl Panton	1	2
(Australia) Mary Carter	6	6
(United Kingdom) Bea Walter	3	6	5
(Spain) Mary Terán de Weiss	6	3	7
(Australia) Beth Ruffin	2	1
(Switzerland) Ruth Kaufmann	6	6
(United Kingdom) Joan Curry	1	2
(United Kingdom) Anne Shilcock	6	6
(United Kingdom) Leonie Brighton	7
(United States) Barbara Davidson	7^{r}
(Australia) Daphne Seeney	1	6	0
6	(United States) Darlene Hard	6	3	6

Second round
(United Kingdom) P Harrison	1	6
(Netherlands) F ten Bosch	6	8
(Australia) M Carter	9	6
(Spain) M Terán de Weiss	7	2
(Switzerland) R Kaufmann	1	6	3
(United Kingdom) A Shilcock	6	3	6
(United Kingdom) L Brighton	2	2
6	(United States) D Hard	6	6

Third round
(Netherlands) F ten Bosch	4	2
(Australia) M Carter	6	6
(United Kingdom) A Shilcock	0	4
6	(United States) D Hard	6	6

Fourth round
(Australia) M Carter	3	3
6	(United States) D Hard	6	6

==== Section 6 ====
First round
(United Kingdom) Georgie Woodgate	2	7	4
(France) Ginette Bucaille	6	5	6
(United Kingdom) Denise Collier	0	6
(United Kingdom) Jennifer Middleton	6	8
(Belgium) Christiane Mercelis	4	9	6
(West Germany) Erika Vollmer	6	7	3
Q	(United Kingdom) Sheila Griffin	2	5
(United Kingdom) Marion Boundy	6	7
(Italy) Nicla Migliori	6	1	2
(Austria) Elizabeth Broz	4	6	6
(South Africa) Valerie Koortzen	1	6	6
Q	(South Africa) Renée Schuurman	6	3	3
(United Kingdom) Rosemary Bulleid	1	1
(Hungary) Zsuzsa Körmöczy	6	6
(New Zealand) Lynne Luxton	0	2
4	(United Kingdom) Angela Mortimer	6	6

Second round
(France) G Bucaille	7	2	1
(United Kingdom) J Middleton	5	6	6
(Belgium) C Mercelis	0	7	8
(United Kingdom) M Boundy	6	5	6
(Austria) E Broz	2	4
(South Africa) V Koortzen	6	6
(Hungary) Z Körmöczy	7	6
4	(United Kingdom) A Mortimer	5	2

Third round
(United Kingdom) J Middleton	2	4
(Belgium) C Mercelis	6	6
(South Africa) V Koortzen	1	3
(Hungary) Z Körmöczy	6	6

Fourth round
(Belgium) C Mercelis	1	2
(Hungary) Z Körmöczy	6	6

==== Section 7 ====
First round

Second round
(United Kingdom) Viola White	6	2	6
Q	(United Kingdom) Marion Craig-Smith	3	6	4
(South Africa) Hazel Redick-Smith	6	6
(India) Rita Davar	1	3
LL	(France) Françoise Lemal	6	6
(United Kingdom) Mollie Govett	1	0
(United States) Constance Ball	2	6	3
7	(Australia) Beryl Penrose	6	4	6

Third round
(United Kingdom) V White	2	2
(South Africa) H Redick-Smith	6	6
LL	(France) F Lemal	1	2
7	(Australia) B Penrose	6	6

Fourth round
(South Africa) H Redick-Smith	6	2	3
7	(Australia) B Penrose	4	6	6

==== Section 8 ====
First round

Second round
(United Kingdom) Pat Ward	6	3	6
(Bermuda) Heather Brewer	4	6	8
(United Kingdom) Elaine Watson	6	6
Q	(United Kingdom) Sheila Speight	2	3
Q	(United Kingdom) Sonia Pool	2	6	3
(United Kingdom) Janet Morgan	6	4	6
(United Kingdom) Rosemary Walsh	0	2
2	(United States) Louise Brough	6	6

Third round
(Bermuda) H Brewer	6	6
(United Kingdom) E Watson	4	1
(United Kingdom) J Morgan	0	0
2	(United States) L Brough	6	6

Fourth round
(Bermuda) H Brewer	2	2
2	(United States) L Brough	6	6

Preceded by 1955 French Championships – Women's singles	Grand Slam women's singles	Succeeded by 1955 U.S. National Championships – Women's singles
