= 1955 Wimbledon Championships – Women's doubles =

Women's doubles
- 1955 Wimbledon Championships

Final
- Champions: (United Kingdom) Angela Mortimer (United Kingdom) Anne Shilcock
- Runners-up: (United Kingdom) Shirley Bloomer (United Kingdom) Pat Ward
- Score: 7–5, 6–1

Details
- Draw: 48 (5Q)
- Seeds: 4

Events
Singles	men	women		boys	girls
Doubles	men	women	mixed	boys	girls
- Wimbledon Championships

Louise Brough and Margaret duPont were the defending champions but did not compete.

Angela Mortimer and Anne Shilcock defeated Shirley Bloomer and Pat Ward in the final, 7–5, 6–1 to win the ladies' doubles tennis title at the 1955 Wimbledon Championships. To date it remains the last all-British women's doubles final.

== Seeds ==
1. (United States) Barbara Davidson / (United States) Doris Hart (second round)
2. (United States) Beverly Fleitz / (United States) Darlene Hard (semifinals)
3. (United Kingdom) Shirley Bloomer / (United Kingdom) Pat Ward (final)
4. (United Kingdom) Angela Mortimer / (United Kingdom) Anne Shilcock (champions)

Click on the seed number of a player to go to their draw section.

== Draw ==
Key

- Q = Qualifier
- WC = Wild card
- LL = Lucky loser
- Alt = Alternate
- ITF = ITF entry
- PR = Protected ranking
- SR = Special ranking
- SE = Special exempt
- JE = Junior exempt
- JR = Junior Accelerator Programme entrant
- CO = College Accelerator Programme entrant
- NG = Next Gen Accelerator Program entrant
- w/o = Walkover
- r = Retired
- d = Defaulted

=== Finals ===
Quarterfinals
2	(United States) Beverly Fleitz (United States) Darlene Hard	6	3	6
(South Africa) Dora Kilian (South Africa) Hazel Redick-Smith	0	6	4
3	(United Kingdom) Shirley Bloomer (United Kingdom) Pat Ward	6	6
(Hungary) Zsuzsa Körmöczy (France) Suzanne Schmitt	3	1
(United Kingdom) Rosemary Walsh (United Kingdom) Billie Woodgate	1	8	0
4	(United Kingdom) Angela Mortimer (United Kingdom) Anne Shilcock	6	6	6
(South Africa) Valerie Koortzen (South Africa) Hazel Pascoe	2	1
(Australia) Jenny Hoad (Australia) Fay Muller	6	6

Semifinals
2	(United States) Beverly Fleitz (United States) Darlene Hard	3	7
3	(United Kingdom) Shirley Bloomer (United Kingdom) Pat Ward	6	9
4	(United Kingdom) Angela Mortimer (United Kingdom) Anne Shilcock	6	6
(Australia) Jenny Hoad (Australia) Fay Muller	2	1

Final
3	(United Kingdom) Shirley Bloomer (United Kingdom) Pat Ward	5	1
4	(United Kingdom) Angela Mortimer (United Kingdom) Anne Shilcock	7	6

=== Top half ===
==== Section 1 ====
First round

Second round
2	(United States) Beverly Fleitz (United States) Darlene Hard	6	6
(Italy) Nicla Migliori (Italy) Lea Pericoli	2	1
(United Kingdom) Betty Dawes (United Kingdom) Peggy Dawson-Scott	2	1
(Australia) Nell Hopman (United States) Dorothy Knode	6	6
(Australia) Mary Carter (Australia) Beryl Penrose	6	6
(United Kingdom) Heather Macfarlane (United Kingdom) Molly Mackay	3	1
(United Kingdom) Rosemary Bulleid (United Kingdom) Georgie Woodgate	2	2
(South Africa) Dora Kilian (South Africa) Hazel Redick-Smith	6	6

Third round
2	(United States) B Fleitz (United States) D Hard	6	2	6
(Australia) E Hopman (United States) D Knode	2	6	4
(Australia) M Carter (Australia) B Penrose	2	2
(South Africa) D Kilian (South Africa) H Redick-Smith	6	6

Quarterfinals
2	(United States) B Fleitz (United States) D Hard	6	3	6
(South Africa) D Kilian (South Africa) H Redick-Smith	0	6	4

==== Section 2 ====
First round
3	(United Kingdom) Shirley Bloomer (United Kingdom) Pat Ward	6	6
(United Kingdom) Gem Gilbert (United Kingdom) Sue Waters	2	1
(United States) Constance Ball (United States) Francesca Leland	2	4
(United States) Gloria Butler (Belgium) Christiane Mercelis	6	6
(United Kingdom) Susan Billington (United Kingdom) Margot Parker	6	6
(United Kingdom) Rita Bentley (United Kingdom) Pat Harrison	2	4
Q	(United Kingdom) Wendy Morris (United Kingdom) Jenny Wagstaff	6	6
(Belgium) Poucette Coessens (Norway) Ida Wrede-Holm	0	3
Q	(United Kingdom) SM Colebrooke (United Kingdom) Lorna White	5	6	5
(United Kingdom) Jean Bee (France) Annie Haillet	7	4	7
(United States) Grace Kelleher (Spain) Mary Terán de Weiss	5	3
(West Germany) Inge Pohmann (West Germany) Erika Vollmer	7	6
(Hungary) Zsuzsa Körmöczy (France) Suzanne Schmitt	4	6	6
(United Kingdom) Joan Curry (United Kingdom) Rita Drobný	6	4	3
(United States) Lois Felix (United States) Kay Hubbell	6	6
(United Kingdom) Barbara Knapp (United Kingdom) Valerie Pitt	1	2

Second round
3	(United Kingdom) S Bloomer (United Kingdom) P Ward	6	7
(United States) G Butler (Belgium) C Mercelis	1	5
(United Kingdom) S Billington (United Kingdom) M Parker	6	5	6
Q	(United Kingdom) W Morris (United Kingdom) J Wagstaff	4	7	2
(United Kingdom) J Bee (France) A Haillet	1	2
(West Germany) I Pohmann (West Germany) E Vollmer	6	6
(Hungary) Z Körmöczy (France) S Schmitt	6	7	8
(United States) L Felix (United States) K Hubbell	8	5	6

Third round
3	(United Kingdom) S Bloomer (United Kingdom) P Ward	6	6
(United Kingdom) S Billington (United Kingdom) M Parker	4	3
(West Germany) I Pohmann (West Germany) E Vollmer	5	7
(Hungary) Z Körmöczy (France) S Schmitt	7	9

Quarterfinals
3	(United Kingdom) S Bloomer (United Kingdom) P Ward	6	6
(Hungary) Z Körmöczy (France) S Schmitt	3	1

=== Bottom half ===
==== Section 3 ====
First round
(United Kingdom) Leonie Brighton (United Kingdom) Joan Quelch	9	6
(Switzerland) Ruth Kaufmann (Netherlands) Fenny ten Bosch	7	4
(United Kingdom) Rosemary Walsh (United Kingdom) Billie Woodgate	6	2	6
Q	(United Kingdom) Janet Morgan (United Kingdom) Sheila Speight	2	6	2
(United Kingdom) Valerie Lewis (United Kingdom) Evelyn Moeller	6	7
Q	(United Kingdom) Sidney Brock (United Kingdom) Pauline Titchener	2	5
(United Kingdom) Mary Eyre (United Kingdom) Viola White	6	6
(France) Ginette Bucaille (France) Susan Chatrier	3	3
(Sweden) Birgit Gullbrandsson-Sandén (Spain) María Josefa de Riba	7	4	2
(Australia) Loris Nichols (Australia) Daphne Seeney	5	6	6
(United Kingdom) Angela Buxton (United Kingdom) Pat Hird	6	6
(United Kingdom) Hazel Cheadle (United Kingdom) Gem Hoahing	2	3
(Bermuda) Heather Brewer (United States) Arvilla McGuire	6	4	2
(United Kingdom) Lorna Cawthorn (United Kingdom) Elaine Watson	3	6	6
(Australia) Alison Baker (United States) Doris Popple	0	2
4	(United Kingdom) Angela Mortimer (United Kingdom) Anne Shilcock	6	6

Second round
(United Kingdom) L Brighton (United Kingdom) J Quelch	5	3
(United Kingdom) R Walsh (United Kingdom) R Woodgate	7	6
(United Kingdom) V Lewis (United Kingdom) E Moeller	4	6	6
(United Kingdom) M Eyre (United Kingdom) V White	6	1	3
(Australia) L Nichols (Australia) D Seeney	1	4
(United Kingdom) A Buxton (United Kingdom) P Hird	6	6
(United Kingdom) L Cawthorn (United Kingdom) E Watson	1	1
4	(United Kingdom) A Mortimer (United Kingdom) A Shilcock	6	6

Third round
(United Kingdom) R Walsh (United Kingdom) R Woodgate	6	4	6
(United Kingdom) V Lewis (United Kingdom) E Moeller	3	6	2
(United Kingdom) A Buxton (United Kingdom) P Hird	3	0
4	(United Kingdom) A Mortimer (United Kingdom) A Shilcock	6	6

Quarterfinals
(United Kingdom) R Walsh (United Kingdom) R Woodgate	1	8	0
4	(United Kingdom) A Mortimer (United Kingdom) A Shilcock	6	6	6

==== Section 4 ====
First round

Second round
(South Africa) Valerie Koortzen (South Africa) Hazel Pascoe	9	6
Q	(United Kingdom) Lesley Fulton (United Kingdom) Mrs FB Webb	7	3
(Austria) Elizabeth Broz (Austria) Ilse Schuh-Proxauf	7	4	3
(United Kingdom) Mary Halford (United Kingdom) Pearl Panton	5	6	6
(United Kingdom) Vera Thomas (United Kingdom) Bea Walter	3	2
(Australia) Jenny Hoad (Australia) Fay Muller	6	6
(United Kingdom) Jennifer Middleton (United Kingdom) Doreen Spiers	6	1	6
1	(United States) Barbara Davidson (United States) Doris Hart	4	6	2

Third round
(South Africa) V Koortzen (South Africa) H Pascoe	6	6
(United Kingdom) M Halford (United Kingdom) P Panton	2	1
(Australia) J Hoad (Australia) F Muller	6	6
(United Kingdom) J Middleton (United Kingdom) D Spiers	2	4

Quarterfinals
(South Africa) V Koortzen (South Africa) H Pascoe	2	1
(Australia) J Hoad (Australia) F Muller	6	6
