= Bill Gilmour Sr. =

Australian tennis player

Bill Gilmour
- Full name: Bill Gilmour Sr.
- Country (sports): Australia
- Born: 9 August 1934

Singles

Grand Slam singles results
- Australian Open: 2R (1954, 1955, 1956)
- Wimbledon: 2R (1955)

Grand Slam mixed doubles results
- Wimbledon: QF (1955)

Bill Gilmour (born 9 August 1934) is an Australian former tennis player of the 1950s.

== Biography ==
A native of Sydney, Gilmour attended Canterbury High School and excelled in swimming as a youth, breaking two of Olympian Bruce Bourke's school backstroke records.

In 1953 he won Australia's junior tennis championships, beating Mal Anderson in the final. Later in the year he took a set off an albeit injured Vic Seixas when they met at the Victorian championships.

On his senior main draw debut at the Australian Championships in 1954, Gilmour won his first round match over Bill Talbert, who was at the time the U.S. Davis Cup captain.

In 1955 he was a mixed doubles quarter-finalist at Wimbledon with Daphne Seeney.

Gilmour began working as a tournament referee in the 1970s, featuring in the Davis Cup and Grand Prix tennis circuit.

His son, Bill Jr, was a professional tennis player.
