= 1955 Wimbledon Championships – Men's doubles =

Men's doubles
- 1955 Wimbledon Championships

Final
- Champions: (Australia) Rex Hartwig (Australia) Lew Hoad
- Runners-up: (Australia) Neale Fraser (Australia) Ken Rosewall
- Score: 7–5, 6–4, 6–3

Details
- Draw: 64 (5Q)
- Seeds: 4

Events
Singles	men	women		boys	girls
Doubles	men	women	mixed	boys	girls
- Wimbledon Championships

Rex Hartwig and Mervyn Rose were the defending champions, but decided not to play together. Rose partnered with George Worthington but lost in the semifinals to Hartwig and his partner Lew Hoad.

Hartwig and Hoad defeated Neale Fraser and Ken Rosewall in the final, 7–5, 6–4, 6–3 to win the gentlemen's doubles tennis title at the 1955 Wimbledon Championship.

== Seeds ==
1. (United States) Vic Seixas / (United States) Tony Trabert (semifinals)
2. (Australia) Rex Hartwig / (Australia) Lew Hoad (champions)
3. (Australia) Neale Fraser / (Australia) Ken Rosewall (semifinals)
4. (United States) Budge Patty / (United States) Ham Richardson (third round)

Click on the seed number of a player to go to their draw section.

== Draw ==
Key

- Q = Qualifier
- WC = Wild card
- LL = Lucky loser
- Alt = Alternate
- ITF = ITF entry
- PR = Protected ranking
- SR = Special ranking
- SE = Special exempt
- JE = Junior exempt
- JR = Junior Accelerator Programme entrant
- CO = College Accelerator Programme entrant
- NG = Next Gen Accelerator Program entrant
- w/o = Walkover
- r = Retired
- d = Defaulted

=== Finals ===
Quarterfinals
2	(Australia) Rex Hartwig (Australia) Lew Hoad	6	6	2	6
(India) Ramanathan Krishnan (India) Naresh Kumar	2	4	6	2
(United States) John Ager (United States) Pablo Eisenberg	3	1	2
(Australia) Mervyn Rose (Australia) George Worthington	6	6	6
(United States) Herbie Flam (Australia) Adrian Quist	4	6	6	2
3	(Australia) Neale Fraser (Australia) Ken Rosewall	6	4	8	6
(United States) Bob Perry (United States) Gilbert Shea	6	1	1
1	(United States) Vic Seixas (United States) Tony Trabert	8	6	6

Semifinals
2	(Australia) Rex Hartwig (Australia) Lew Hoad	7	6	6	2	6
(Australia) Mervyn Rose (Australia) George Worthington	9	4	4	6	1
3	(Australia) Neale Fraser (Australia) Ken Rosewall	6	1	6	4	6
1	(United States) Vic Seixas (United States) Tony Trabert	2	6	1	6	3

Final
2	(Australia) Rex Hartwig (Australia) Lew Hoad	7	6	6
3	(Australia) Neale Fraser (Australia) Ken Rosewall	5	4	3

=== Top half ===
==== Section 1 ====
First round
2	(Australia) Rex Hartwig (Australia) Lew Hoad	6	3	9	8
(France) Jean-Noël Grinda (France) Jean-Claude Molinari	3	6	7	6
(Chile) Andrés Hammersley (Australia) Harry Hopman	0	11	6	7
Q	(United Kingdom) John Drinkall (United Kingdom) Martin Hime	6	9	1	5
(United Kingdom) Eric Bulmer (United Kingdom) John Ward	6	6	5	6
(United Kingdom) Ralph Oliver (United Kingdom) Howard Walton	0	2	7	3
(United Kingdom) Eric Filby (Dominion of Ceylon) Doug Scharenguivel	4	2	7
(Argentina) Ernesto della Paolera (Argentina) Alejo Russell	6	6	9
(Uruguay) Eduardo Argon (Spain) Jaime Bartrolí	0	1	3
(India) Ramanathan Krishnan (India) Naresh Kumar	6	6	6
(Belgium) Pierre Geelhand de Merxem (Belgium) Gino Mezzi	w/o
Q	(United Kingdom) Reg Kaley (United Kingdom) Francis Wallis
(Netherlands) Hans van Dalsum (Netherlands) Fred Dehnert	3	2	2
LL	(United Kingdom) Basil Hutchins (United Kingdom) Geoffrey Owen	6	6	6
(United Kingdom) Tony Mottram (United Kingdom) Geoffrey Paish	7	6	6
(Trinidad and Tobago) Ian McDonald (Austria) Hans Redl	5	1	1

Second round
2	(Australia) R Hartwig (Australia) L Hoad	6	6	6
(Chile) A Hammersley (Australia) H Hopman	2	2	1
(United Kingdom) E Bulmer (United Kingdom) J Ward	10	2	6	3	6
(Argentina) E della Paolera (Argentina) A Russell	8	6	4	6	3
(India) R Krishnan (India) N Kumar	6	6	6
Q	(United Kingdom) R Kaley (United Kingdom) F Wallis	1	3	2
(United Kingdom) B Hutchins (United Kingdom) G Owen	3	2	2
(United Kingdom) A Mottram (United Kingdom) G Paish	6	6	6

Third round
2	(Australia) R Hartwig (Australia) L Hoad	6	6	6
(United Kingdom) E Bulmer (United Kingdom) J Ward	2	0	3
(India) R Krishnan (India) N Kumar	6	6	6
(United Kingdom) A Mottram (United Kingdom) G Paish	2	2	3

Quarterfinals
2	(Australia) R Hartwig (Australia) L Hoad	6	6	2	6
(India) R Krishnan (India) N Kumar	2	4	6	2

==== Section 2 ====
First round
4	(United States) Budge Patty (United States) Ham Richardson	6	6	6
(Austria) Freddie Huber (Austria) Franz Saiko	3	1	3
(Socialist Federal Republic of Yugoslavia) Josip Palada (Socialist Federal Republic of Yugoslavia) Ilija Panajotović	13	2	3	4
(Hungary) István Gulyás (Hungary) István Sikorszki	11	6	6	6
(France) Philippe Chatrier (France) Marc Lasry	0	1	3
(United States) John Ager (United States) Pablo Eisenberg	6	6	6
(United States) Gardnar Mulloy (United States) Bud Robineau	7	3	4
(United States) Sidney Schwartz (Sweden) Staffan Stockenberg	9	6	6
(United Kingdom) Headley Baxter (United Kingdom) Claude Lister	0	3	1
(United Kingdom) Mike Davies (United Kingdom) Billy Knight	6	6	6
(South Africa) Abe Segal (South Africa) Ian Vermaak	5	13	6	12
(Australia) Jack Arkinstall (Australia) Bob Howe	7	15	3	14
(Chile) Luis Ayala (Poland) Władysław Skonecki	6	6	7
(Uruguay) Arsenio Motolko (Venezuela) Isaías Pimentel	3	4	5
(Australia) Mervyn Rose (Australia) George Worthington	6	6	10
(Australia) Mal Anderson (Australia) Geoff Radford	4	2	8

Second round
4	(United States) J Patty (United States) H Richardson	6	6	6
(Hungary) I Gulyás (Hungary) I Sikorszki	2	4	2
(United States) J Ager (United States) P Eisenberg	6	5	6	7
(United States) S Schwartz (Sweden) S Stockenberg	1	7	4	5
(United Kingdom) M Davies (United Kingdom) W Knight	4	6	6	0	3
(Australia) J Arkinstall (Australia) R Howe	6	4	2	6	6
(Chile) L Ayala (Poland) W Skonecki	2	6	1	3
(Australia) M Rose (Australia) G Worthington	6	2	6	6

Third round
4	(United States) J Patty (United States) H Richardson	w/o
(United States) J Ager (United States) P Eisenberg
(Australia) J Arkinstall (Australia) R Howe	3	5	2
(Australia) M Rose (Australia) G Worthington	6	7	6

Quarterfinals
(United States) J Ager (United States) P Eisenberg	3	1	2
(Australia) M Rose (Australia) G Worthington	6	6	6

=== Bottom half ===
==== Section 3 ====
First round
(Sweden) Sven Davidson (Denmark) Kurt Nielsen	6	6	6
(United States) Donald Flye (United States) Malcolm Fox	1	2	3
(United States) Herbie Flam (Australia) Adrian Quist	6	6	6
Q	(United Kingdom) Colin Hannam (Australia) Dick Potter	1	1	2
LL	(United Kingdom) Norman Dale (United Kingdom) John Melhuish	1	3	2
(Sweden) Lennart Bergelin (Sweden) Torsten Johansson	6	6	6
Q	(Hungary) András Kálmán (United Kingdom) DE Wright	3	4	3
(Denmark) Søren Højberg (United States) Tony Vincent	6	6	6
(Canada) Robert Bédard (Canada) Don Fontana	4	3	8	6	4
(France) Jean Borotra (France) Robert Haillet	6	6	6	2	6
(South Africa) Trevor Fancutt (South Africa) Owen Williams	6	6	6
(Belgium) Ivan Devroe (Belgium) Jacques Peten	1	3	0
Q	(West Germany) Rupert Huber (West Germany) Peter Scholl	2	4	1
(Egypt) Jaroslav Drobný (Argentina) Enrique Morea	6	6	6
(United Kingdom) Tony Clayton (United Kingdom) Peter Moys	2	1	1
3	(Australia) Neale Fraser (Australia) Ken Rosewall	6	6	6

Second round
(Sweden) S Davidson (Denmark) K Nielsen	1	4	4
(United States) H Flam (Australia) A Quist	6	6	6
(Sweden) L Bergelin (Sweden) T Johansson	6	9	6	6
(Denmark) S Højberg (United States) A Vincent	3	11	4	4
(France) J Borotra (France) R Haillet	4	5	4
(South Africa) T Fancutt (South Africa) O Williams	6	7	6
(Egypt) J Drobný (Argentina) E Morea	6	6	2	3
3	(Australia) N Fraser (Australia) K Rosewall	4	8	6	6

Third round
(United States) H Flam (Australia) A Quist	6	3	6	6
(Sweden) L Bergelin (Sweden) T Johansson	1	6	4	1
(South Africa) T Fancutt (South Africa) O Williams	2	2	1
3	(Australia) N Fraser (Australia) K Rosewall	6	6	6

Quarterfinals
(United States) H Flam (Australia) A Quist	4	6	6	2
3	(Australia) N Fraser (Australia) K Rosewall	6	4	8	6

==== Section 4 ====
First round
(United States) George Druliner (United States) John Fleitz	6	2	8	6
(Switzerland) René Buser (Socialist Federal Republic of Yugoslavia) Stefán László	4	6	6	2
(South Africa) Gordon Forbes (South Africa) Russell Seymour	w/o
(Spain) José María Draper (Spain) Emilio Martínez
(United Kingdom) Geoff Ward (United Kingdom) Ivor Warwick	2	6	6	5
(United States) Art Larsen (United States) Hugh Stewart	6	4	8	7
(Australia) Ashley Cooper (Australia) Bill Gilmour	6	4	10	6	8
(United States) Bob Perry (United States) Gilbert Shea	4	6	12	3	10
(Australia) Arthur Gubb (Australia) Cedric Mason	4	5	2
(Italy) Nicola Pietrangeli (Italy) Orlando Sirola	6	7	6
(Belgium) Jacques Brichant (Belgium) Philippe Washer	8	6	6
(United Kingdom) Henry Billington (United Kingdom) Don Butler	6	2	2
(United Kingdom) Tony Pickard (United Kingdom) Bobby Wilson	6	6	6
(United Kingdom) John Horn (Poland) Czesław Spychała	4	3	4
(United Kingdom) John Barrett (United Kingdom) Roger Becker	6	2	1
1	(United States) Vic Seixas (United States) Tony Trabert	8	6	6

Second round
(United States) G Druliner (United States) J Fleitz	6	6	6	6
(Spain) JM Draper (Spain) E Martínez	0	2	8	1
(United States) A Larsen (United States) H Stewart	5	2	4
(United States) R Perry (United States) G Shea	7	6	6
(Italy) N Pietrangeli (Italy) O Sirola	6	9	9
(Belgium) J Brichant (Belgium) P Washer	4	7	7
(United Kingdom) A Pickard (United Kingdom) R Wilson	1	1	1
1	(United States) V Seixas (United States) A Trabert	6	6	6

Third round
(United States) G Druliner (United States) J Fleitz	5	5	2
(United States) R Perry (United States) G Shea	7	7	6
(Italy) N Pietrangeli (Italy) O Sirola	6	18	4	4	1
1	(United States) V Seixas (United States) A Trabert	4	16	6	6	6

Quarterfinals
(United States) R Perry (United States) G Shea	6	1	1
1	(United States) V Seixas (United States) A Trabert	8	6	6
