= 1955 Wimbledon Championships – Boys' singles =

Boys' singles
- 1955 Wimbledon Championships

Final
- Champion: (United Kingdom) Mike Hann
- Runner-up: (Sweden) Jan-Erik Lundqvist
- Score: 6–0, 11–9

Events
Singles	men	women		boys	girls
Doubles	men	women	mixed	boys	girls
← 1954 ·	Wimbledon Championships	· 1956 →

Mike Hann defeated Jan-Erik Lundqvist in the final, 6–0, 11–9 to win the boys' singles tennis title at the 1955 Wimbledon Championships.

== Draw ==
=== Key ===
- Q = Qualifier
- WC = Wild card
- LL = Lucky loser
- Alt = Alternate
- SE = Special exempt
- PR = Protected ranking
- ITF = ITF entry
- JE = Junior exempt
- w/o = Walkover
- r = Retired
- d = Defaulted
- SR = Special ranking

=== Draw ===
First round
(South Africa) Ian Froman	3	6	6
(Denmark) Flemming Harris	6	1	2
(United Kingdom) Mike Hann	6	6
(Egypt) Nabil Hassan	0	1
(Belgium) Albert Lemaire	6	6
(Austria) E Herzig	2	1
(Norway) Thorvald Moe	8	6	6
(Republic of Ireland) Ronan Fearon	6	8	3
(Socialist Federal Republic of Yugoslavia) H Željko	2	3
(India) Akhtar Ali	6	6
(Netherlands) Hans van de Weg	6	8
(Italy) Gian Enrico Maggi	2	6
(France) Jean-Paul Jauffret	1	2
(Spain) Andrés Gimeno	6	6

Quarterfinals
(South Africa) Ian Froman	3	4
(United Kingdom) Mike Hann	6	6
(Belgium) Albert Lemaire	6	6
(Norway) Thorvald Moe	1	2
(India) Akhtar Ali	6	6
(Netherlands) Hans van de Weg	0	2
(Spain) Andrés Gimeno	1	5
(Sweden) Jan-Erik Lundqvist	6	7

Semifinals
(United Kingdom) Mike Hann	7	6
(Belgium) Albert Lemaire	5	1
(India) Akhtar Ali	6	3	4
(Sweden) Jan-Erik Lundqvist	3	6	6

Final
(United Kingdom) Mike Hann	6	11
(Sweden) Jan-Erik Lundqvist	0	9
