= List of South Africa Davis Cup team representatives =

This is a list of tennis players who have represented the South Africa Davis Cup team in an official Davis Cup match. South Africa have taken part in the competition since 1913.

== Players ==
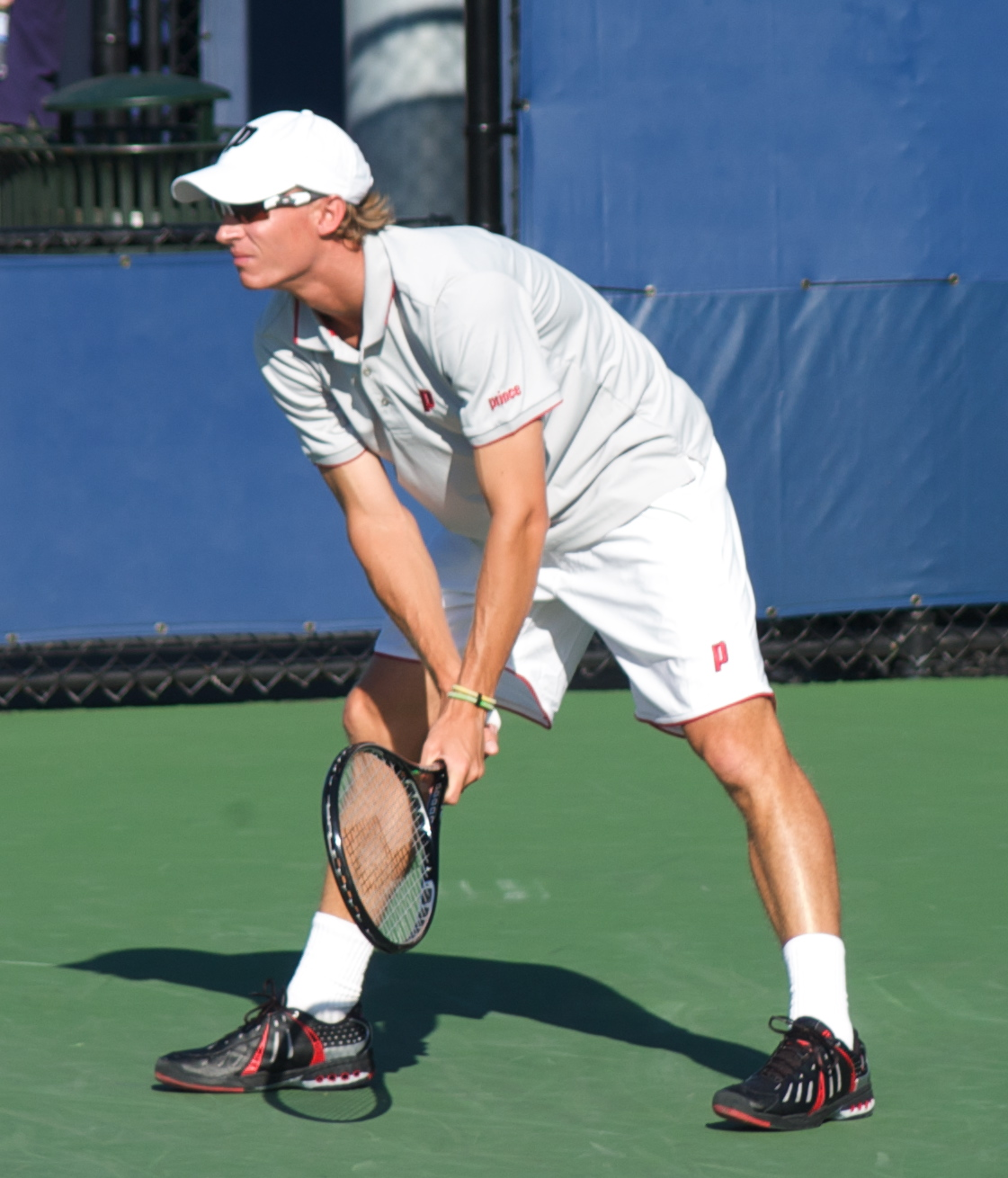
Rik de Voest

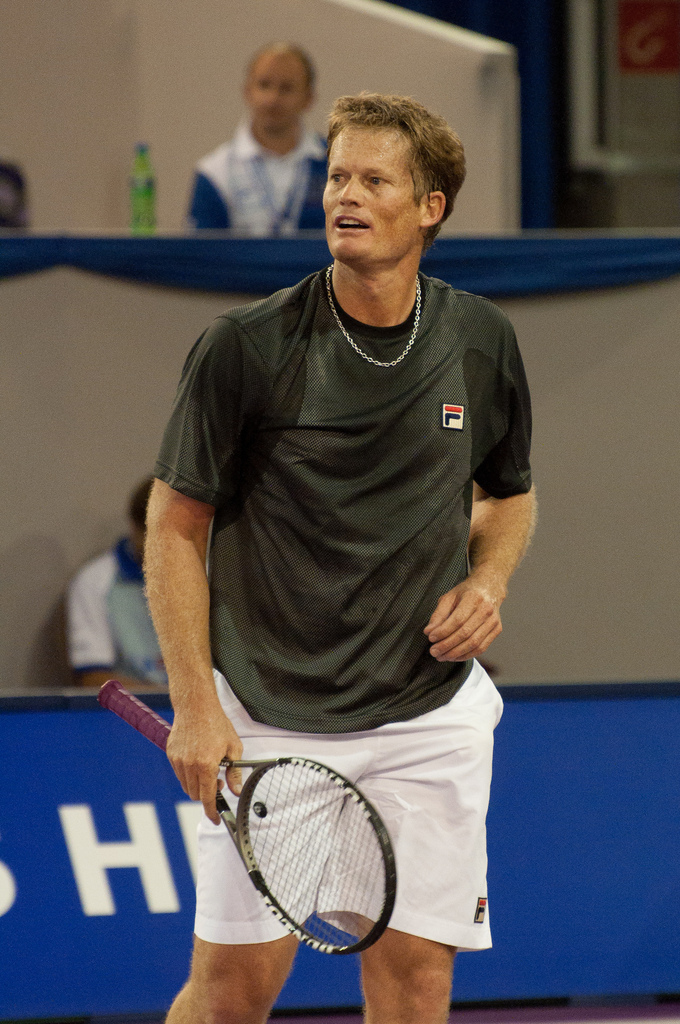
Wayne Ferreira

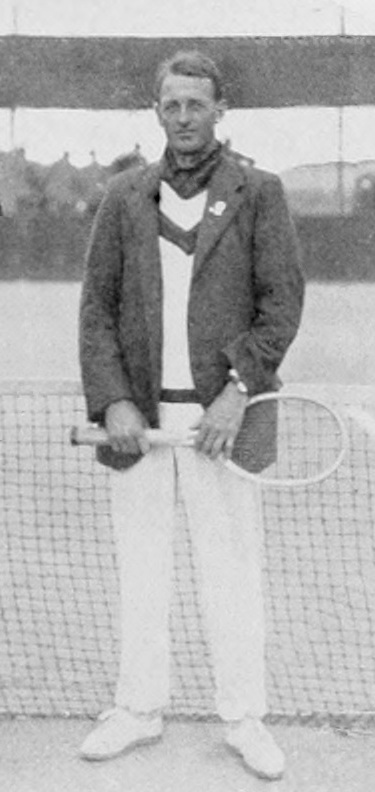
Charles Winslow

| Player | W-L (Total) | W-L (Singles) | W-L (Doubles) | Ties | Debut |
|---|---|---|---|---|---|
| David Adams | 4–2 | 0–0 | 4–2 | 6 | 1997 |
| Harold Aitken | 0–1 | 0–0 | 0–1 | 1 | 1919 |
| Kevin Anderson | 9–1 | 8–1 | 1–0 | 5 | 2008 |
| Byron Bertram | 3–6 | 2–5 | 1–1 | 5 | 1974 |
| Max Bertram | 0–2 | 0–2 | 0–0 | 1 | 1935 |
| Justin Bower | 2–5 | 2–5 | 0–0 | 4 | 2000 |
| Jeff Coetzee | 13–5 | 0–2 | 13–3 | 17 | 2000 |
| Jack Condon | 6–5 | 4–4 | 2–1 | 5 | 1927 |
| Pat Cramer | 3–1 | 2–1 | 1–0 | 2 | 1973 |
| John-Laffnie de Jager | 5–1 | 0–0 | 5–1 | 6 | 1999 |
| Rik de Voest | 24–14 | 15–12 | 9–2 | 21 | 2002 |
| Keith Diepraam | 20–12 | 12–9 | 8–3 | 11 | 1964 |
| George Dodd | 1–2 | 1–1 | 0–1 | 1 | 1919 |
| Cliff Drysdale | 35–14 | 32–12 | 3–2 | 24 | 1962 |
| Trevor Fancutt | 2–2 | 2–2 | 0–0 | 2 | 1957 |
| Eustace Fannin | 9–7 | 6–5 | 3–2 | 7 | 1937 |
| Norman Farquharson | 13–10 | 4–7 | 9–3 | 12 | 1929 |
| Wayne Ferreira | 41–18 | 30–14 | 11–4 | 25 | 1992 |
| Ellis Ferreira | 1–3 | 0–0 | 1–3 | 4 | 1996 |
| Gordon Forbes | 20–11 | 11–9 | 9–2 | 14 | 1955 |
| Albert Gaertner | 4–2 | 1–1 | 3–1 | 4 | 1960 |
| Victor Gauntlett | 1–2 | 1–1 | 0–1 | 1 | 1913 |
| Neville Godwin | 4–5 | 2–5 | 2–0 | 4 | 1999 |
| Chris Haggard | 3–2 | 0–0 | 3–2 | 5 | 2003 |
| Bob Hewitt | 38–4 | 22–3 | 16–1 | 17 | 1967 |
| Deon Joubert | 1–1 | 0–1 | 1–0 | 1 | 1973 |
| Vernon Kirby | 16–8 | 9–7 | 7–1 | 10 | 1931 |
| Raven Klaasen | 3–2 | 3–1 | 0–1 | 4 | 2009 |
| Robbie Koenig | 3–0 | 0–0 | 3–0 | 3 | 2002 |
| Gaetan Koenig | 0–2 | 0–2 | 0–0 | 1 | 1960 |
| R.F. le Sueur | 0–3 | 0–2 | 0–1 | 1 | 1913 |
| Sydney Levy | 1–2 | 1–2 | 0–0 | 2 | 1949 |
| Julien Lezard | 2–2 | 1–1 | 1–1 | 2 | 1926 |
| Bob Maud | 8–2 | 8–2 | 0–0 | 7 | 1965 |
| Julius Mayer | 3–3 | 3–3 | 0–0 | 3 | 1961 |
| Frew McMillan | 25–5 | 2–0 | 23–5 | 28 | 1965 |
| Bernard Mitton | 2–7 | 1–7 | 1–0 | 4 | 1973 |
| Wesley Moodie | 18–7 | 14–5 | 4–2 | 15 | 2002 |
| Ray Moore | 12–11 | 12–10 | 0–1 | 12 | 1967 |
| Gary Muller | 1–1 | 0–0 | 1–1 | 2 | 1995 |
| David Nainkin | 1–2 | 1–2 | 0–0 | 2 | 1998 |
| Leon Norgarb | 0–1 | 0–0 | 0–1 | 1 | 1951 |
| Pieter Norval | 3–4 | 0–1 | 3–3 | 6 | 1993 |
| Marcos Ondruska | 13–9 | 12–9 | 1–0 | 12 | 1993 |
| Louis Raymond | 10–11 | 5–8 | 5–3 | 10 | 1919 |
| Ivie Richardson | 0–1 | 0–1 | 0–0 | 1 | 1924 |
| Colin Robbins | 4–4 | 4–4 | 0–0 | 4 | 1929 |
| Abe Segal | 24–13 | 10–8 | 14–5 | 19 | 1955 |
| Russell Seymour | 3–2 | 2–2 | 1–0 | 2 | 1953 |
| Gerald Sherwell | 0–2 | 0–2 | 0–0 | 1 | 1926 |
| Patrick Spence | 14–7 | 10–5 | 4–2 | 9 | 1924 |
| Grant Stafford | 1–7 | 0–7 | 1–0 | 5 | 1994 |
| Eric Sturgess | 13–5 | 10–2 | 3–3 | 6 | 1947 |
| Izak van der Merwe | 7–9 | 7–7 | 0–2 | 10 | 2006 |
| Christo van Rensburg | 7–0 | 4–0 | 3–0 | 5 | 1992 |
| Ian Vermaak | 5–7 | 3–6 | 2–1 | 6 | 1953 |
| Danie Visser | 6–0 | 1–0 | 5–0 | 5 | 1992 |
| Louis Vosloo | 0–2 | 0–2 | 0–0 | 1 | 2002 |
| Raymond Weedon | 2–0 | 2–0 | 0–0 | 2 | 1959 |
| Charles Winslow | 2–1 | 2–0 | 0–1 | 1 | 1920 |
| Fritz Wolmarans | 8–1 | 4–1 | 4–0 | 6 | 2006 |
| Bryan Woodroffe | 1–0 | 0–0 | 1–0 | 1 | 1953 |
