= Fancutt =

Fancutt is a surname. Notable people with the surname include:

- Charlie Fancutt (born 1959), Australian tennis player
- Daphne Fancutt, married Daphne Seeney, (1933–2020), Australian tennis player
- Michael Fancutt (born 1961), Australian tennis player
- Trevor Fancutt (1934–2022), South African tennis player
