= Silbernes Lorbeerblatt =

- Type: Badge and Ribbon
- Presented by: Federal Republic of Germany
- Status: Currently awarded
- Established: 1950

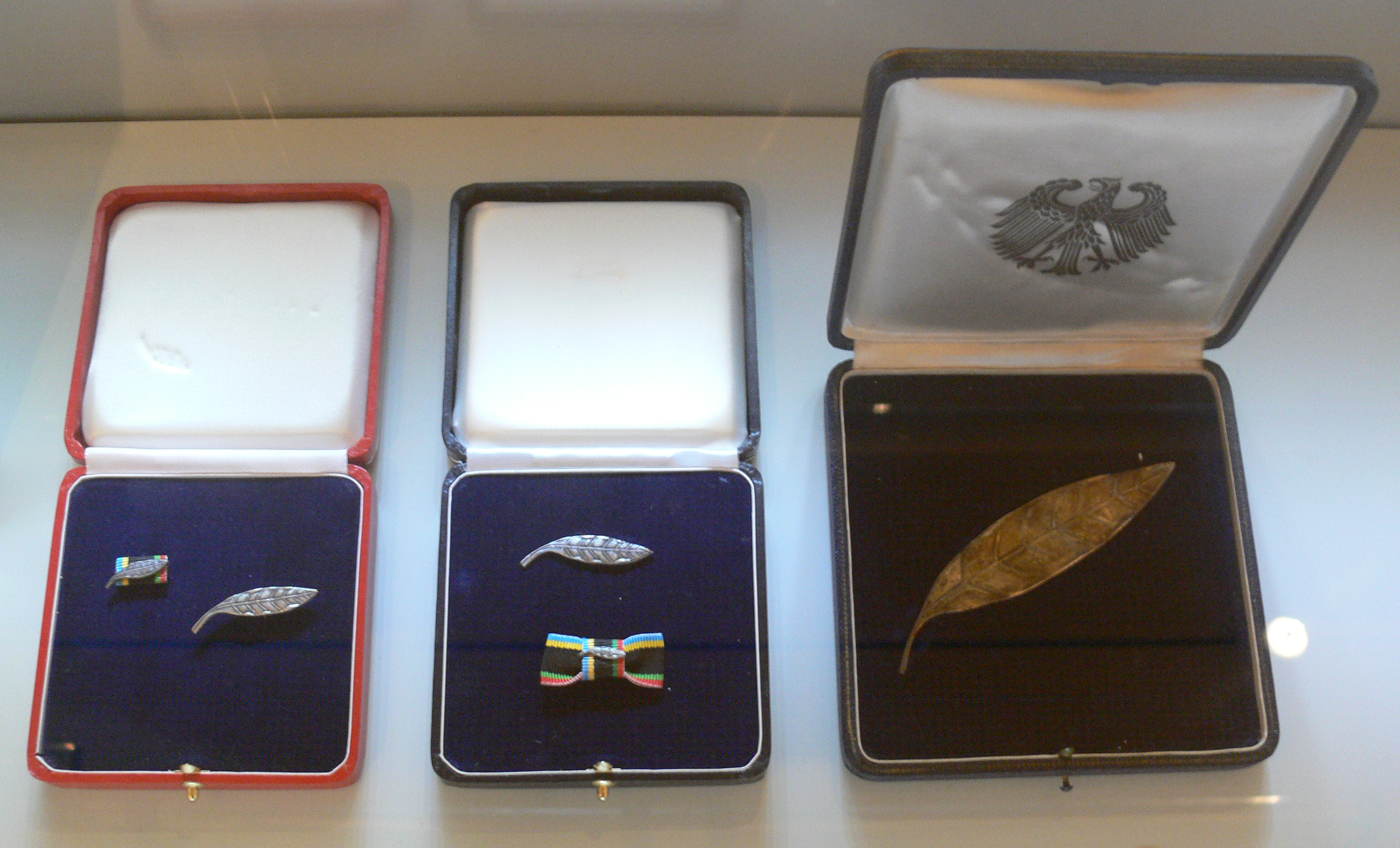
Different types of the "Silbernes Lorbeerblatt"

Silbernes Lorbeerblatt (German pronunciation: [ˈzɪlbɐnəs ˈlɔʁbeːɐ̯ˌblat], lit. 'Silver Laurel Leaf'), the highest sports award in Germany, was endowed on 23 June 1950 by the German President Theodor Heuss. It is awarded to athletes and teams of exemplary character that have won medals at Olympic and Paralympic Games, won important international titles like the football World Cup, or placed several times at international championships.

To be honored with Silbernes Lorbeerblatt, an athlete or a team has to be nominated by the president of the German Olympic Sports Confederation to the German President. The request will be reviewed by the Office of the German President and the Federal Ministry of the Interior as this agency is responsible for sport in Germany. The President and the Minister of the Interior both sign the application, following article 58 of the Grundgesetz.

== Individual honourees ==
- Bengt Zikarsky, Swimming.
- Bernd Kannenberg, Race walking. Honoured in 1972
- Birgit Prinz, Football.
- Boris Becker, Tennis. Honoured in 1985
- Boris Becker and Michael Stich, Tennis, 1992 Doubles Gold Medalists. Honoured 6 October 1992.
- Claudia Nicoleitzik, paralympic sprinter. Honoured in 2008 and 2016.
- Dirk Nowitzki, Basketball, NBA Champion 2011, NBA MVP 2007, NBA Finals MVP 2011, 13× NBA All-Star.
- Edda Buding, Tennis. Honoured 1 January 1964.
- Fabian Hambüchen, Gymnastics.
- Franz Beckenbauer, Football.
- Fritz Thiedemann, Equestrianism. Honoured 25 June 1950.
- Hans Lenk, Rowing.
- Heinrich Popow, paralympic sprinter. Honoured 6 November 2012.
- Helga Niessen, Tennis. Honoured 22 July 1970.
- Inge Pohmann, Tennis. Honoured 25 June 1950.
- Jens Weißflog, Ski jumping.
- Kirsten Bruhn, Paralympic swimmer.
- Lena Schöneborn, Modern Pentathlon. Honoured in 2008.
- Magdalena Neuner, Biathlon.
- Mario Gómez, Football. Honoured in 2010.
- Matthias Steiner, Olympic weightlifting.
- Mesut Özil, Football. Honoured in 2014.
- Michael Schumacher, Formula racing. At that time, dual World Drivers Champion. Honoured in 1997.
- Olaf Pollack, Cycling. Honoured in 2001.
- Oliver Ortmann, Cue Sports. Honoured in 1996.
- Ralf Souquet, Cue Sports. Honoured in 1997.
- Rüdiger Neitzel, Handball. Honoured in 1984.
- Sara Däbritz, Football. Honoured in 2016.
- Sebastian Vettel, Formula racing. At that time, dual World Drivers Champion. Honoured on 22 February 2012.
- Steffi Graf, Tennis.
- Toni Ulmen, Motor Sport. Honoured in 1953.
- Verena Bentele, blind Paralympic biathlete and cross-country skier.
- Werner Grübmeyer. Honoured 1954.
- Wilhelm Brem, vision-impaired Paralympic gold medalist in skiing. Honoured in 2010.
- Wolfgang Güllich, Sport climbing. Honoured in 1985, with Kurt Albert.
- Xu Huaiwen, Badminton.
- Thomas Gerull, Fencing.

== Teams ==
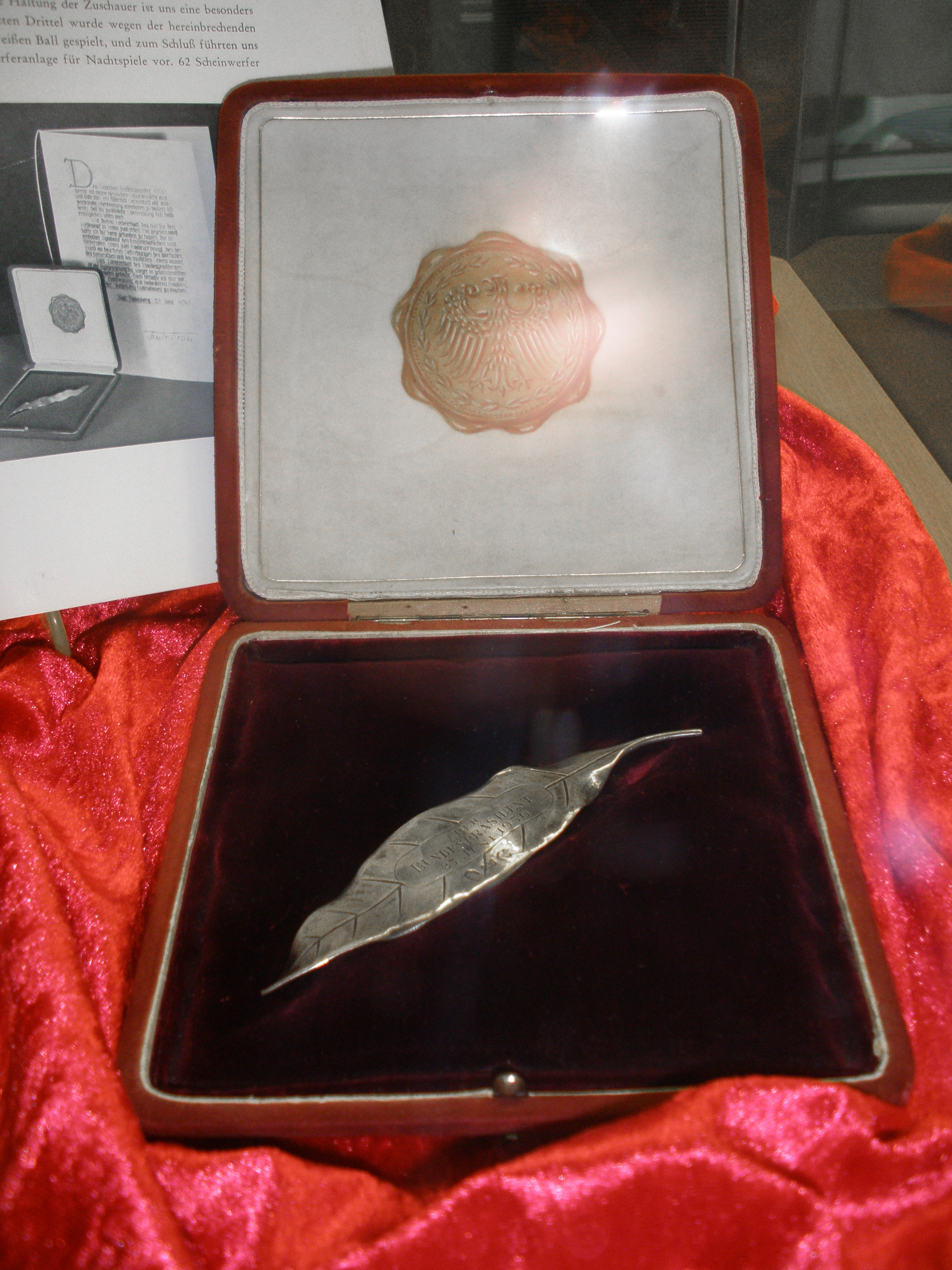
The first Silbernes Lorbeerblatt was awarded to a team, VfB Stuttgart, in 1950

- 1. TC Ludwigsburg A-Team (formation dance Standard, World Champion 1985–1990, 1995, 1996, 2007)
- Bayern Munich (in 1967)
- Braunschweiger TSC A-Team (formation dance Standard, World Champion 1991–1994, 2000, 2004, 2005, 2011)
- Deutschlandachter (for winning Olympic gold at the London 2012 Olympics)
- Deutschlandachter (for winning Olympic silver at the Rio 2016 Olympics)
- Germany men's national handball team (World Champion 2007)
- Germany national football team (European Champion 1972, 1980, 1996 and World Champion 1954, 1974, 1990, 2014)
- Germany national women's wheelchair basketball team (Paralympic silver medallists 2008, Paralympic gold medallists 2012)
- Germany women's national football team (European Champion 1989, 1991, 1995, 1997, 2001, 2005, 2009, 2013 and World Champion 2003, 2007 and Olympic Games Champion 2016)
- Pinta yachting team (One Ton Cup and Admiral's Cup in 1994)
- Team Telekom (First place at the 1997 Tour de France)
- TSG Bremerhaven A-Team (formation dance Latin American, World Champion 1977, 1979–1981, 1983–1985, 1987, 1991, 1994, 1995, 2000, 2001, 2007)
- VfB Stuttgart (for the German football championship 1950)
