= Matthew Farhang Mohtadi =

Iranian tennis player (1926–2020)

M. F. Mohtadi
- Country (sports): Iran
- Born: 6 January 1926 Tehran, Iran
- Died: 4 July 2020 (aged 94) Calgary, Alberta, Canada

Singles
- Career record: 28-9
- Career titles: 1

Grand Slam singles results
- Wimbledon: 1R (1949, 1950, 1951, 1952, 1953, 1954, 1955)

Grand Slam doubles results
- Wimbledon: 2R (1953)

Grand Slam mixed doubles results
- Wimbledon: 3R (1953, 1954)

Matthew Farhang Mohtadi (Persian: متیو فرهنگ مهتدی; January 6, 1926 – July 4, 2020) was a Canadian academic and sportsman, originally from Iran.

== Sporting career ==
Mohtadi made the final of the 1944 Middle East Championships, for table tennis. He was a member of the Iran national basketball team that competed at the 1948 Summer Olympics in London. He played in their match against France.

Mohtadi also played tennis in 1948 he played his first tournament at the Midland Counties Championships at Edgbaston where he reached the quarter finals. He also competed in seven successive Wimbledon Championships from 1949 to 1955. On each occasion he exited in the opening round, to Headley Baxter, Marcel Coen, Derek Bull, Bryan Woodroffe, Staffan Stockenberg, Edwin Tsai and Bob Perry. His losses to Coen and Bull were in five set matches. In 1953 he won the Priory Whitsun Lawn Tennis Tournament at the Priory Club, Birmingham, England against Edwin Tsai, this was his only title win. In 1954 he was runner-up at the North of England Hard Court Championships in Scarborough, to Ignacy Tłoczyński of Poland. In May 1961 he played his final tennis tournament at the Moseley Championship Moseley, Birmingham where he reached the quarter finals.

He also played squash competing in the British Open Squash Championships.

== Academic and personal life ==
While in England, Mohtadi obtained a PhD in chemical engineering from the University of Birmingham. He ended up in Canada, teaching at the University of Calgary. During his many years with the university, he served for a period of time as the Chemical and Petroleum Engineering Department Head and as Director of Public Relations in the Faculty of Engineering. He is the father of Nick Mohtadi, an orthopaedic surgeon and former professional tennis player.
