= Inge Pohmann =

German tennis player

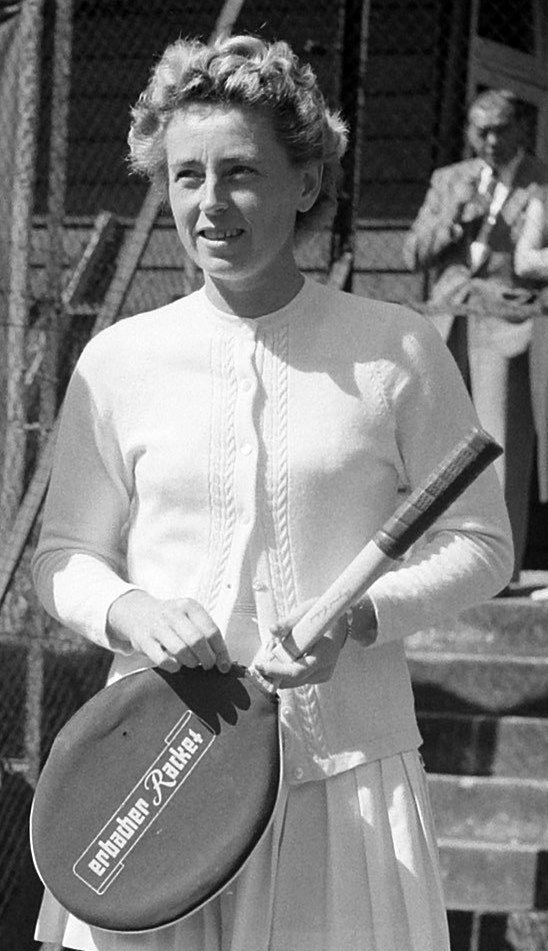
- Country (sports): West Germany
- Born: 1921 or 1922; Breslau, Germany
- Died: 26 January 2005; Berlin, Germany
- Plays: Right-handed

Singles

Grand Slam singles results
- Wimbledon: 1R (1952, 1955)

Doubles

Grand Slam doubles results
- Wimbledon: 3R (1955)

Grand Slam mixed doubles results
- Wimbledon: 2R (1952)

Inge Pohmann (née Hartelt; 1921 or 1922 – 26 January 2005) was a German female tennis player whose career lasted from the end of World War II until the mid-1950s.

Pohmann won the German national singles title in 1950, 1951 and 1953. She was the No.1 ranked player in Germany in 1950.

She was a three-time singles runner-up at the International German Championships in Hamburg. In 1948, playing under the flag of Allied-occupied Germany she lost the final to compatriot Ursula Rosenow. The following year, 1949, Mary Terán de Weiss defeated her in the final three sets, as did Joy Mottram in 1954.

Pohmann competed in the Wimbledon Championships in 1952 and 1955. At both editions she was defeated in the first round of the singles event. In 1952 she partnered Henri Paul Brechbuhl in the mixed doubles event and lost their first match. She teamed up with compatriot Erika Vollmer in the 1955 doubles event and reached it to the third round.

At the international Wiesbaden tournament in May 1954 she reached the final of the singles event which she lost in straight sets to world No. 1 ranked player Maureen Connolly.

In July 1950 she received the Silbernes Lorbeerblatt (Silver Laurel Leaf), the highest sports award in Germany. She was the first female sportsperson to receive the award.

She was the mother of tennis player Hans-Jürgen Pohmann.

== Major career finals ==
=== Singles: 3 (3 runner-ups) ===
Result	Date	Tournament	Surface	Opponent	Score
Loss	Aug 1948	International German Championships, Germany	Clay	(Allied-occupied Germany) Ursula Rosenow	2–6, 6–8
Loss	Aug 1949	International German Championships, Germany	Clay	(Argentina) Mary Terán de Weiss	2–6, 8–6, 7–9
Loss	Aug 1954	International German Championships, Germany	Clay	(United Kingdom) Joy Mottram	6–2, 7–5, 2–6
