= Priory Whitsun Lawn Tennis Tournament =

Defunct tennis tournament
- Founded: 1920; 105 years ago
- Abolished: 1960; 65 years ago
- Location: Priory Club
- Surface: Grass

The Priory Whitsun Lawn Tennis Tournament also known as the Priory Open Lawn Tennis Tournament, or the Priory Club Tournament was a men's and women's grass court tennis event established in 1920 that ran until 1960. In May 1963 the Priory Club was destroyed by a fire, and in 1964 it merged with the Edgbaston Cricket and Lawn Tennis Club to form the Edgbaston Priory Club.

== History ==
Edgbaston Cricket and Lawn Tennis Club founded in 1878 and continued to stage both the Edgbaston Open Tournament until 1908 and the Midland Counties Championships until November 1964. Priory Lawn Tennis Club founded in 1865. In 1920 the Priory Club established its most popular event known as the Priory Whitsun Tournament sometimes referred to as the Priory Club Tournament usually held in June. This event ran until 1960. In May 1963 the Priory Club was destroyed by a fire, talks about merger took place of the coming months with the Edgbaston C.L.T.C. In December 1964 the new club was formed the Edgbaston Priory Club, which continued to host the Midland Counties event until 1977.

Edgbaston Cricket and Lawn Tennis Club was in the early decades of the two clubs the more socially prestigious and nationally high-profile, and better resourced. The focus of the Priory Club was more local but its growth was similarly impressive. The Priory Club’s tournaments and prizes were more restrained than Edgbaston’s. Priory Club tournament's were played on six courts rather than Edgbaston’s twelve.

— The History of Edgbaston Priory Club (2013) by Dr. Matt Cole: Historian Edgbaston Priory Club. Page 2.

Former winners of the men's singles title has included; Harry Lee, George Lyttleton-Rogers, Kho Sin-Khie, Tony Mottram, Jack Harper, Dilip Kumar Bose, Dick Savitt, Matthew Farhang Mohtadi, Ham Richardson, Sven Viktor Davidson and Bobby Wilson.

Previous winners of women's singles title has included; Joan Fry, Dorothy Round, Mary Heeley, Hilde Krahwinkel Sperling, Helen Jacobs, Nancye Wynne Bolton, Louise Brough, Pat Canning Todd and Sheila Armstrong.

== See also ==
- Edgbaston Open
- Midland Counties Championships
- Edgbaston Priory Club
