= Werner Grübmeyer =

German politician (1926–2018)

- Werner Grübmeyer
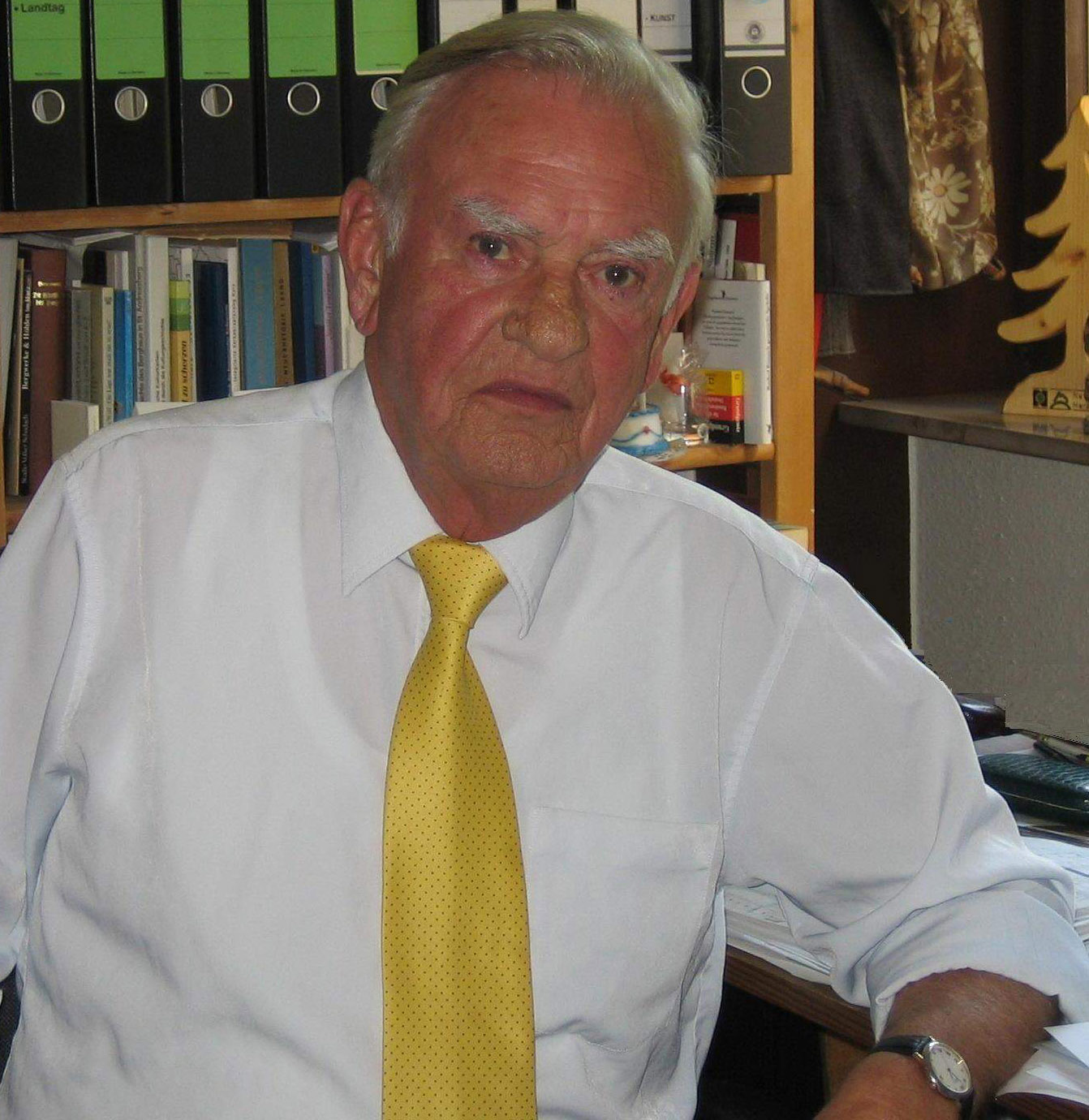
- Werner Grübmeyer (2008)
- Born: June 1, 1926; Lehe (Bremerhaven, Germany)
- Died: October 5, 2018 (aged 92); Hanover
- Burial place: Sankt Andreasberg; 51.7113904, 10.5219541
- Citizenship: de
- Occupation: politician
- Spouse: Renate Funke
- Children: 3

Werner Grübmeyer (1 June 1926 Lehe (Bremerhaven, Germany) – 5 October 2018 Hannover) was a German politician. He was a member of the Christian Democratic Union (CDU).

During his political career, Grübmeyer was involved in state and local politics, parasports, and nature conservation. From 1978 to 1986 he served in the Landtag of Lower Saxony.

== Life ==
After leaving school Grübmeyer attended the Heeres-Unteroffiziervorschule German (Army pre NCO-School) in Hannover. In October 1944, during World War II, he was severely wounded, leading to a 100% war-disablement. After the war, Grübmeyer began his academic studies to become a teacher in different levels of education.

Grübmeyer came to Sankt Andreasberg in 1956 to take a post as principal of the local secondary school (Haupt- and Realschule). On March 19, 1961, he was elected Mayor of Sankt Andreasberg and held this office for 37 years.

As Mayor and city counsil member. Grübmeyer succeeded in having Andreasberg officially recognised as a climatic spa ("Staatlich anerkannter Heilklimatischer Kurort"). He also was key in the preservation of the local Hospital and the preservation of the status as a town.

Grübmeyer worked for the Minister-President of the Landtag of Lower Saxony and as a Referee of the Lower Saxony Ministry of Science and Culture and held several other offices.

From 1961 to 1968 Grübmeyer was member of the Goslar county council and member of the district committee of the Zellerfeld District. In 1974, he was again elected member of the Goslar county council, member of the district committee of the Zellerfeld District and in addition chairman of the CDU country assembly faction.

On June 21, 1978, Grübmeyer received a direct mandate of the CDU for the ninth parliamentary term of the Landtag of Lower Saxony, got re-elected for tenth parliamentary term and stayed member of the Landtag until 1986.

Grübmeyer was involved in parasports, research and education and accompanied the founding of the Harz National Park. He was Member of the ZDF Television Council.

From his first marriage he had three children. His second wife was the NDR-presenter Renate Funke.

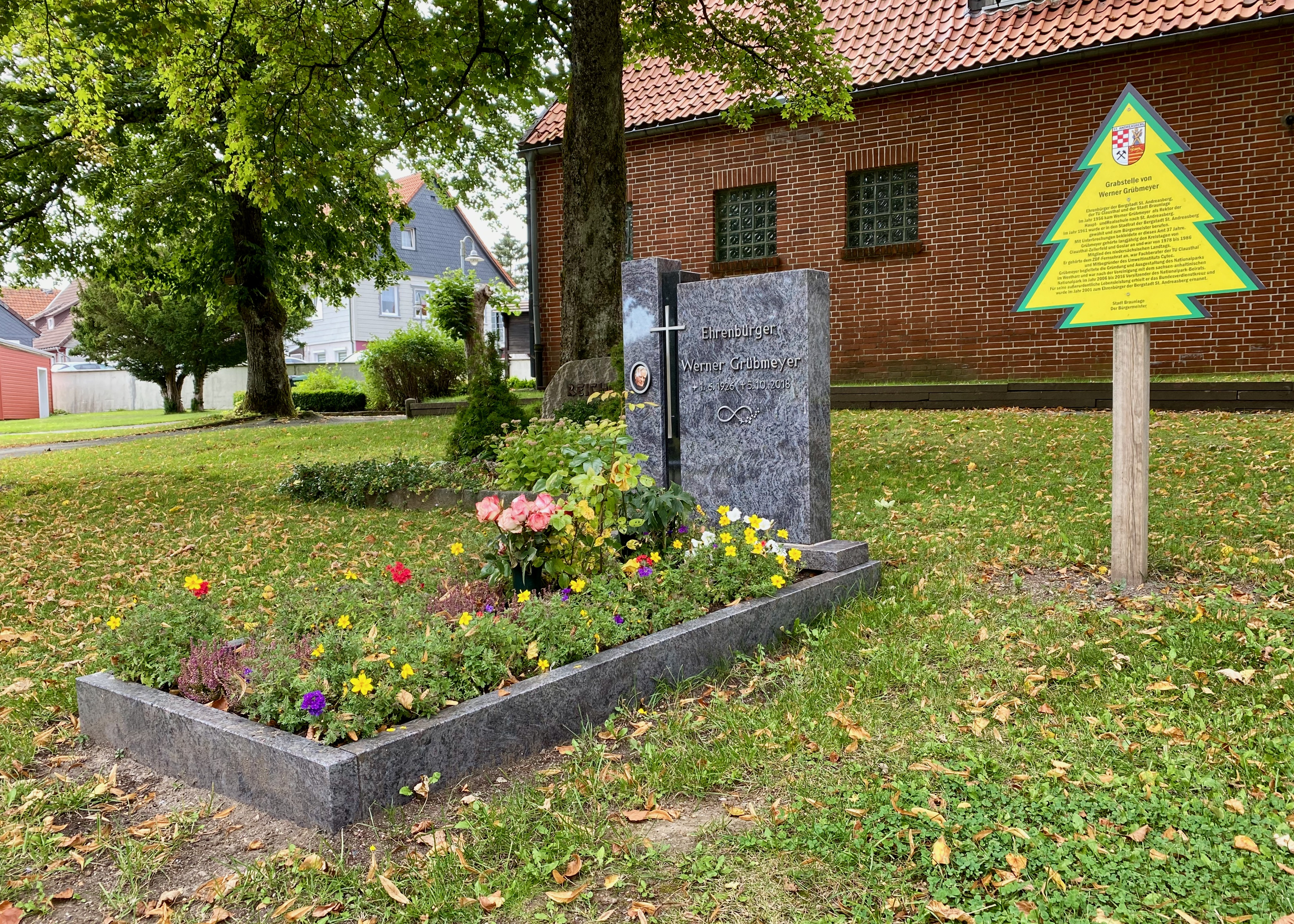
Grave and Dennert Fir Tree

Grübmeyer died in 2018 in Hanover and was buried in Sankt Andreasberg. The Town of Braunlage (successor of Sankt Andreasberg) donated a Dennert Fir Tree in memory of his life's work.

== Honours and awards ==
1954 Silver Laurel Leaf.

On the occasion of the opening of the metallurgy center of the Clausthal University of Technology Grübmeyer was named honorary citizen of the university.

In 2006 the university honored Grübmeyer again by naming a lecture hall after him.

1997 Order of Merit of the Federal Republic of Germany (Verdienstorden der Bundesrepublik Deutschland, or Bundesverdienstorden). It was presented on August 20, 1997, in the Guesthouse of the government of Lower Saxony by Frank-Walter Steinmeier,.

In 2001 honorary citizenship of mining town Sankt Andreasberg.

2016 the town of Braunlage renamed a circular hiking trail, the former Dreibrode-Rundwanderweg, after him. and he received the Badge of honour of the state of Saxony-Anhalt.

On October 2, 2020, the registered organization for the History and Archeology of Sankt Andreasberg (St. Andreasberger Verein für Geschichte und Altertumskunde e. V.) opened a collected Archive to whom Grübmeyers widow. Renate Funke. bestowed 30 tomes from the estate of Werner Grübmeyer.

== Literature ==
- Barbara Simon: Abgeordnete in Niedersachsen 1946–1994. Biographisches Handbuch. Hrsg. vom Präsidenten des Niedersächsischen Landtages. Niedersächsischer Landtag, Hannover 1996, p. 133.
- Friedhart Knolle: Ein Wanderweg und die Ehrennadel des Landes Sachsen-Anhalt für Werner Grübmeyer in Unser Harz, Geschichte und Geschichten aus dem gesamten Harz, Clausthal-Zellerfeld, Heft 08/2016
