= 1955 Wimbledon Championships – Girls' singles =

Girls' singles
- 1955 Wimbledon Championships

Final
- Champion: (United Kingdom) Sheila Armstrong
- Runner-up: (France) Béatrice de Chambure
- Score: 6–2, 6–4

Details
- Draw: 12

Events
Singles	men	women		boys	girls
Doubles	men	women	mixed	boys	girls
- Wimbledon Championships

Sheila Armstrong defeated Béatrice de Chambure in the final, 6–2, 6–4 to win the girls' singles tennis title at the 1955 Wimbledon Championships.

== Draw ==
Key

- Q = Qualifier
- WC = Wild card
- LL = Lucky loser
- Alt = Alternate
- ITF = ITF entry
- PR = Protected ranking
- SR = Special ranking
- SE = Special exempt
- JE = Junior exempt
- JR = Junior Accelerator Programme entrant
- CO = College Accelerator Programme entrant
- NG = Next Gen Accelerator Program entrant
- w/o = Walkover
- r = Retired
- d = Defaulted

=== Draw ===
First round
(France) Béatrice de Chambure	6	6
(Republic of Ireland) Gene Hogan	0	0
(West Germany) G Stelges	4	10	3
(Netherlands) Fredy Marinkelle	6	8	6
(United Kingdom) Sheila Armstrong	6	6
(Norway) B Lorentzen	0	1
(Jamaica) D Crampton	7	2
(Belgium) MN Fossion	9	6

Quarterfinals
(Denmark) T Dahl	0	3
(Australia) W Middleton	6	6
(France) Béatrice de Chambure	6	6
(Netherlands) Fredy Marinkelle	0	1
(United Kingdom) Sheila Armstrong	6	7
(Belgium) MN Fossion	1	5
(South Africa) Valerie Koortzen	6	6
(Sweden) L Engdahl	0	2

Semifinals
(Australia) W Middleton	4	4
(France) Béatrice de Chambure	6	6
(United Kingdom) Sheila Armstrong	6	6
(South Africa) Valerie Koortzen	3	2

Final
(France) Béatrice de Chambure	2	4
(United Kingdom) Sheila Armstrong	6	6
