= 1955 Wimbledon Championships =

- Date: 20 June – 2 July
- Edition: 69th
- Category: Grand Slam
- Surface: Grass
- Location: Church Road; SW19, Wimbledon, London, United Kingdom
- Venue: All England Lawn Tennis and Croquet Club
- Attendance: 287,362

Champions

Men's singles
- (United States) Tony Trabert

Women's singles
- (United States) Louise Brough

Men's doubles
- (Australia) Rex Hartwig / (Australia) Lew Hoad

Women's doubles
- (United Kingdom) Angela Mortimer / (United Kingdom) Anne Shilcock

Mixed doubles
- (United States) Vic Seixas / (United States) Doris Hart

Boys' singles
- (United Kingdom) Michael Hann

Girls' singles
- (United Kingdom) Sheila Armstrong
← 1954 ·	Wimbledon Championships	· 1956 →

The 1955 Wimbledon Championships took place on the outdoor grass courts at the All England Lawn Tennis and Croquet Club in Wimbledon, London, United Kingdom. The tournament was held from Monday 20 June until Saturday 2 July 1955. It was the 69th staging of the Wimbledon Championships, and the third Grand Slam tennis event of 1955. Tony Trabert and Louise Brough won the singles titles.

== Champions ==
=== Seniors ===
==== Men's singles ====
(United States) Tony Trabert defeated (Denmark) Kurt Nielsen, 6–3, 7–5, 6–1

==== Women's singles ====
(United States) Louise Brough defeated (United States) Beverly Fleitz, 7–5, 8–6

==== Men's doubles ====
(Australia) Rex Hartwig / (Australia) Lew Hoad defeated (Australia) Neale Fraser / (Australia) Ken Rosewall, 7–5, 6–4, 6–3

==== Women's doubles ====
(United Kingdom) Angela Mortimer / (United Kingdom) Anne Shilcock defeated (United Kingdom) Shirley Bloomer / (United Kingdom) Patricia Ward, 7–5, 6–1

==== Mixed doubles ====
(United States) Vic Seixas / (United States) Doris Hart defeated (Argentina) Enrique Morea / (United States) Louise Brough, 8–6, 2–6, 6–3

=== Juniors ===
==== Boys' singles ====
(United Kingdom) Michael Hann defeated (Sweden) Jan-Erik Lundqvist, 6–0, 11–9

==== Girls' singles ====
(United Kingdom) Sheila Armstrong defeated (France) Béatrice de Chambure, 6–2, 6–4

Preceded by 1955 French Championships	Grand Slams	Succeeded by 1955 U.S. National Championships
