= Mike Hann =

British tennis player (born 1937)

- Country (sports): United Kingdom
- Born: 24 August 1937 (age 88) Sheffield, South Yorkshire, England
- Turned pro: 1952(amateur tour)
- Retired: 1968

Singles
- Career record: 96–77 (10–15 per ATP)
- Career titles: 12

Grand Slam singles results
- Australian Open: 2R (1961)
- French Open: 2R (1961, 1962)
- Wimbledon: 3R (1958, 1959, 1962)
- US Open: 1R (1960, 1963)

Grand Slam doubles results
- Wimbledon: 4R (1963)

Grand Slam mixed doubles results
- Wimbledon: 4R (1962)

Michael Preston Hann (born 24 August 1937) is a former British tennis player who won the Wimbledon Boys' singles title in 1955.

== Tennis career ==
In 1955 Hann won the Wimbledon Boys' Singles title when he beat Jan-Erik Lundqvist in the final.

Hann competed on the amateur circuit during the 1950s and 60s and won 12 titles, all in the United Kingdom. In June 1953, two months before his 16th birthday, Hann won the Chapel Allerton Gentleman's Singles Championships in Leeds. He also won this Championship in 1954 and 1956.

Hann participated at the Wimbledon Championships, in the singles and/or doubles, for a period of 13 years from 1955 to 1967. His best results were to reach the third round in the singles on three occasions and the fourth round in doubles once, in 1963 when he and his partner, Roger Taylor lost to Gordon Forbes and Abe Segal.

== Junior Grand Slam titles ==
=== Singles: 1 ===
Result	Year	Tournament	Surface	Opponent	Score
Win	1955	Wimbledon	Grass	(Sweden) Jan-Erik Lundqvist	6–0, 11–9
