= Ian Froman =

South African-born Israeli tennis player and patron (1937–2024)

- איאן פרומן
- Born: 6 May 1937; Johannesburg, South Africa
- Died: 8 September 2024 (aged 87)
- Occupation: Dentist
- Known for: Playing tennis in the Wimbledon Championships, representing Israel in Davis Cup competition, and playing a primary role in the founding of the Israel Tennis Centers

Ian Froman (Hebrew: איאן פרומן; 6 May 1937 – 8 September 2024) was a South African-born Israeli tennis player and tennis patron.

Froman is known for having played in the Wimbledon Championships in the 1950s, representing Israel in Davis Cup competition in the 1960s and 1970s, and playing a primary role in the founding of the Israel Tennis Centers in the 1970s and thereafter.

== Early life ==
Froman, who was Jewish, was born in Johannesburg, South Africa. He became a dentist in Johannesburg, and then immigrated to Israel in 1964.

== Tennis career ==
Froman played at Wimbledon in 1955, in the Men's singles. In the first two rounds he defeated Stefan Lazlo (9–11, 7–5, 6–4, 2–0, ret.), and Johannes (Hans) van Dalsum (3–6, 3–6, 6–2, 6–1, 6–4), before losing in the third round to eventual finalist Kurt Nielsen (3–6, 1–6, 2–6). Over a decade later, he played for the Israel Davis Cup team in Davis Cup competition in 1968, 1969, and 1971.

== Israel Tennis Centers ==
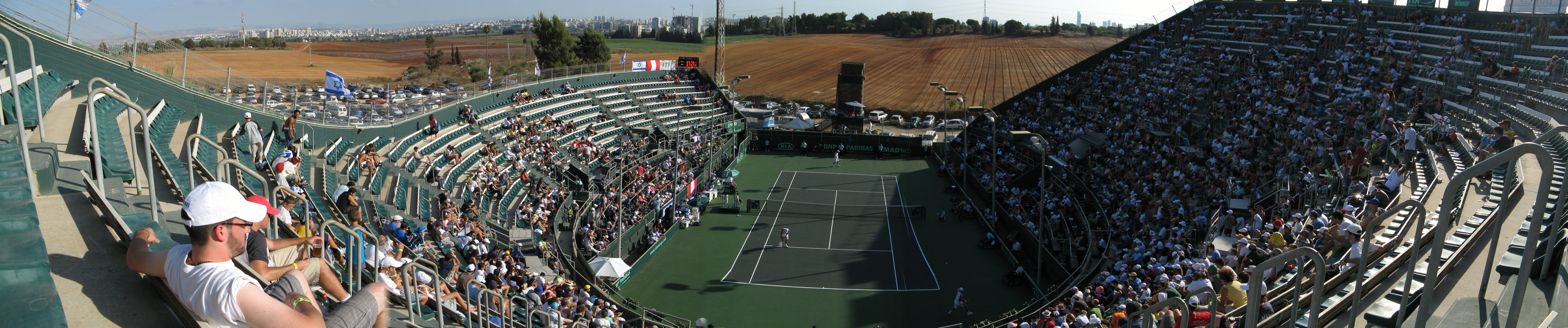
The National Tennis Center (Canada Stadium); 2008

In 1973, tennis in Israel was played primarily by tourists at beach hotels. That year, Froman conceived the idea of founding the Israel Tennis Centers (ITCs), Israel's countrywide tennis program. By 1974, he met four Americans — Rubin Josephs, Harold Landesberg, Dr. William Lippy, and Joe Shane—and English tennis star Angela Buxton, who agreed to launch the necessary fundraising efforts and obtain the necessary sites to build the centers. They built a 14-court National Tennis Center on an old strawberry patch in Ramat HaSharon that was given to the ITC by the Israeli government. It was the first of 12 centers built in Israel—with the others being in Arad, Ashdod, Ashkelon, Beersheva, Haifa, Jaffa, Jerusalem, Kiryat Shemona, Ofakim, and Tel Aviv, Tiberias.

Froman served as director of the center, and then starting in 2004 as its chairman. In 2005, he announced that he would not seek re-election when his term ended in 2006.

== Death ==
Froman died on 8 September 2024, at the age of 87.

== Honors ==
Froman was awarded the Israel Prize in 1989. In presenting it to him, Israeli President Chaim Herzog said: "You have created a virtual social revolution throughout Israel." He was also awarded the International Jewish Sports Hall of Fame Pillar of Achievement Award.
