= Bryan Woodroffe =

South African tennis player (1929–1993)

- Full name: Bryan Maxwell Woodroffe
- Country (sports): South Africa
- Born: 6 December 1929 Johannesburg, South Africa
- Died: 24 October 1993 (aged 63) Durban, South Africa

Singles

Grand Slam singles results
- French Open: 2R (1953)
- Wimbledon: 3R (1953)

Bryan Maxwell Woodroffe (6 December 1929 – 24 October 1993) was a South African tennis player.

Born in Johannesburg, Woodroffe was active on tour in the 1950s and was a South African Davis Cup representative. His style of play was described as being similar to that of Eric Sturgess. He featured twice at Wimbledon and during his first visit to England in 1952 won the singles title at the Essex Championships. In 1953 he made the Wimbledon third round, losing in four sets to Kurt Nielsen. He played his only Davis Cup rubber in doubles against Germany in Berlin in 1953, where he and Russell Seymour came from two sets down to win over Rolf Göpfert and Horst Hermann.

Woodroffe was a chairman for the national selection committee.

== See also ==
- List of South Africa Davis Cup team representatives
