= Naresh Kumar (tennis) =

Indian tennis player (1928–2022)

- Country (sports): India
- Born: 22 December 1928 Lahore, Punjab, British India
- Died: 14 September 2022 (aged 93) Kolkata, West Bengal, India
- Plays: Right-handed

Singles
- Career record: 115/135 (46%)
- Career titles: 5

Grand Slam singles results
- Wimbledon: 4R (1955)

Grand Slam doubles results
- Wimbledon: QF (1953, 1955, 1958)

Grand Slam mixed doubles results
- Wimbledon: QF (1957)

Naresh Kumar (22 December 1928 – 14 September 2022) was an Indian tennis player. He was the playing captain of the India Davis Cup team from 1955 to 1960. He was the non-playing captain of the India Davis Cup team from 1989 to 1993.

== Early life ==
Kumar was born in Lahore, Punjab, British India on 22 December 1928.

== Playing career ==
Kumar played his first tournament at the 1949 Indian International Championships and reached the semi-finals. In the spring of 1949, he reached the final of the Northern Championships in England before losing to Tony Mottram. Later that year, he lost to George Worthington in the final of the East of England Championships. He began playing in the India Davis Cup team in 1952 and represented India for the ensuing eight years. Kumar advanced to the final of the 1950 Bombay tournament before losing to Narendra Nath in four sets. He was the finalist in the 1951 Ceylon Championships at Nuwara Eliya the following year, losing to Iftikhar Ahmed Khan. He also reached the finals in the 1951 Midland Counties Championships at Edgbaston, England, but lost to Don Candy from Australia.

Kumar won three men's singles titles at the 1951, 1952 and 1953 Irish Championships. He also won three men's singles title at the 1951, 1952 and 1953 Welsh Championships. Five years later, he won the singles title at the Essex Championships at Frinton-on-Sea, England. In 1958, he won his fifth and final singles title of his professional career at the Wengen tournament in Switzerland. His best singles result at a grand slam tournament came at the 1955 Wimbledon Championships, where he advanced to the fourth round before losing in straight sets to Tony Trabert, the No. 1 seed and eventual champion. Kumar also advanced to the quarterfinals of Wimbledon's men's doubles tournament in 1953, 1955, and 1958, as well as the quarterfinals of its mixed doubles in 1957. He played his final tournament also the Asian Championships in 1969. Kumar held a record of having played 101 matches as an amateur at the Wimbledon Championships.

== Coaching career ==
Kumar was appointed captain of the India Davis Cup team in 1989 and served in that role until 1993. He gave Leander Paes his debut in the deciding doubles rubber against Japan during the 1990 tournament. Paes and Zeeshan Ali ultimately prevailed 18–16 in the fifth set to clinch the tie.

Kumar was conferred the Dronacharya Award in 2022, becoming the first tennis coach to bestowed the honour. He also received the Arjuna Award in 1962.

== Personal life ==
Kumar was married to Sunita until his death. Together, they had three children.

Kumar died on 14 September 2022 in Kolkata. He was 93, and suffered from unspecified age-related issues prior to his death.
