= 1955 Wimbledon Championships – Men's singles =

Men's singles
- 1955 Wimbledon Championships

Final
- Champion: (United States) Tony Trabert
- Runner-up: (Denmark) Kurt Nielsen
- Score: 6–3, 7–5, 6–1

Details
- Draw: 128 (10Q)
- Seeds: 8

Events
Singles	men	women		boys	girls
Doubles	men	women	mixed	boys	girls
- Wimbledon Championships

In the 1955 Wimbledon Championships men's singles event, Tony Trabert defeated Kurt Nielsen in the final, 6–3, 7–5, 6–1 to win the gentlemen's singles tennis title. Jaroslav Drobný was the defending champion but lost in the quarterfinals to Tony Trabert.

It was the second of two Men's Singles competitions at Wimbledon in which an unseeded Nielsen had progressed to the final, and he remains the only unseeded player to achieve this twice.

== Seeds ==
1. (United States) Tony Trabert (champion)
2. (Australia) Ken Rosewall (semifinals)
3. (United States) Vic Seixas (second round)
4. (Australia) Lew Hoad (quarterfinals)
5. (Australia) Rex Hartwig (third round)
6. (Egypt) Jaroslav Drobný (quarterfinals)
7. (United States) Budge Patty (semifinals)
8. (Sweden) Sven Davidson (quarterfinals)

Click on the seed number of a player to go to their draw section.

== Draw ==
Key

- Q = Qualifier
- WC = Wild card
- LL = Lucky loser
- Alt = Alternate
- ITF = ITF entry
- PR = Protected ranking
- SR = Special ranking
- SE = Special exempt
- JE = Junior exempt
- JR = Junior Accelerator Programme entrant
- CO = College Accelerator Programme entrant
- NG = Next Gen Accelerator Program entrant
- w/o = Walkover
- r = Retired
- d = Defaulted

=== Finals ===
Quarterfinals
2	(Australia) Ken Rosewall	6	6	6
8	(Sweden) Sven Davidson	4	1	2
(Italy) Nicola Pietrangeli	6	3	7	2	5
(Denmark) Kurt Nielsen	1	6	5	6	7
7	(United States) Budge Patty	6	6	6
4	(Australia) Lew Hoad	4	4	4
6	(Egypt) Jaroslav Drobný	6	1	4
1	(United States) Tony Trabert	8	6	6

Semifinals
2	(Australia) Ken Rosewall	9	2	6	4
(Denmark) Kurt Nielsen	11	6	2	6
7	(United States) Budge Patty	6	2	2
1	(United States) Tony Trabert	8	6	6

Final
(Denmark) Kurt Nielsen	3	5	1
1	(United States) Tony Trabert	6	7	6

=== Top half ===
==== Section 1 ====
First round
2	(Australia) Ken Rosewall	6	6	6
(United Kingdom) Geoffrey Owen	4	4	1
(Australia) George Worthington	6	6	6
(United States) Tony Vincent	1	2	1
(United Kingdom) John Barrett	6	4	8	9
(United Kingdom) Geoff Cass	3	6	6	7
(Socialist Federal Republic of Yugoslavia) Josip Palada	4	6	6	6
(Spain) José María Draper	6	2	3	1
Q	(United Kingdom) Clive Bernstein	1	1	4
(United Kingdom) Mike Davies	6	6	6
(Portugal) Carlos Figueira	0	1	1
(United States) Wayne Van Voorhees	6	6	6
(Spain) Jaime Bartrolí	3	1	3
Q	(South Africa) Cyril Botha	6	6	6
(Italy) Giuseppe Merlo	6	6	6
(Trinidad and Tobago) Ian McDonald	0	2	4

Second round
2	(Australia) K Rosewall	6	5	6	6
(Australia) G Worthington	0	7	1	2
(United Kingdom) J Barrett	6	6	6
(Socialist Federal Republic of Yugoslavia) J Palada	4	3	3
(United Kingdom) M Davies	6	6	10
(United States) W Van Voorhees	4	2	8
Q	(South Africa) C Botha	1	4	6	1
(Italy) G Merlo	6	6	3	6

Third round
2	(Australia) K Rosewall	6	6	6
(United Kingdom) J Barrett	3	2	2
(United Kingdom) M Davies	6	6	4	6	6
(Italy) G Merlo	8	1	6	3	8

Fourth round
2	(Australia) K Rosewall	6	6	2
(Italy) G Merlo	4	1	1^{r}

==== Section 2 ====
First round
8	(Sweden) Sven Davidson	4	6	6	4	8
(United States) Ham Richardson	6	3	4	6	6
(Australia) Arthur Gubb	2	6	1
(Argentina) Enrique Morea	6	8	6
(United Kingdom) Tony Pickard	6	5	4	6	3
(Austria) Franz Saiko	4	7	6	4	6
(Belgium) Gino Mezzi	w/o
(United Kingdom) Billy Knight
(United Kingdom) Eric Bulmer	1	3	3
(India) Ramanathan Krishnan	6	6	6
(South Africa) Russell Seymour	8	6	7
Q	(United States) Hugh Sweeney	6	1	5
(West Germany) Rupert Huber	9	8	4	7
(Hungary) István Gulyás	7	10	6	9
(Chile) Luis Ayala	6	6	7
(Australia) Cedric Mason	2	3	5

Second round
8	(Sweden) S Davidson	6	6	6
(Argentina) E Morea	4	4	2
(Austria) F Saiko	3	2	2
(United Kingdom) W Knight	6	6	6
(India) R Krishnan	6	6	5	7
(South Africa) R Seymour	2	1	7	5
(Hungary) I Gulyás	2	1	3
(Chile) L Ayala	6	6	6

Third round
8	(Sweden) S Davidson	6	6	2	4	6
(United Kingdom) W Knight	3	3	6	6	3
(India) R Krishnan	2	6	6	12	2
(Chile) L Ayala	6	8	4	10	6

Fourth round
8	(Sweden) S Davidson	4	6	7	6
(Chile) L Ayala	6	1	5	4

==== Section 3 ====
First round
3	(United States) Vic Seixas	6	6	6
(United Kingdom) Tony Clayton	3	0	0
(Sweden) Torsten Johansson	6	1	6	3	4
(United States) Gilbert Shea	4	6	4	6	6
LL	(United Kingdom) Laurie Proctor	6	3	6	6
(Belgium) Ivan Devroe	4	6	2	2
(Australia) Adrian Quist	6	7	6
(Canada) Don Fontana	0	5	2
(Italy) Nicola Pietrangeli	6	4	8	6
(France) Jean-Noël Grinda	2	6	6	3
(United Kingdom) Tony Mottram	6	6	6
(United States) Gardnar Mulloy	1	4	1
(United Kingdom) Colin Hannam	6	6	6
Q	(United Kingdom) Jeffrey Robinson	4	3	1
(United Kingdom) John Ward	6	0	2	4
(United States) John Ager	4	6	6	6

Second round
3	(United States) V Seixas	6	4	4	6	4
(United States) G Shea	3	6	6	4	6
LL	(United Kingdom) L Proctor	2	0	2
(Australia) A Quist	6	6	6
(Italy) N Pietrangeli	7	5	11	5	6
(United Kingdom) A Mottram	5	7	9	7	2
(United Kingdom) C Hannam	1	3	8	1
(United States) J Ager	6	6	6	6

Third round
(United States) G Shea	6	5	7	6
(Australia) A Quist	2	7	5	3
(Italy) N Pietrangeli	1	6	7	6
(United States) J Ager	6	4	5	4

Fourth round
(United States) G Shea	6	4	4	4
(Italy) N Pietrangeli	2	6	6	6

==== Section 4 ====
First round
5	(Australia) Rex Hartwig	6	6	6
(United Kingdom) Bob Lee	2	1	2
(United Kingdom) Gerry Oakley	6	6	6
(United Kingdom) Ralph Oliver	4	2	4
(South Africa) Abe Segal	6	6	6
(France) Gil de Kermadec	0	0	3
(United Kingdom) Ivor Warwick	6	1	4	5
(Argentina) Alejo Russell	3	6	6	7
Q	(United Kingdom) Howard Walton	2	4	5
Q	(Australia) Dick Potter	6	6	7
(Australia) Arthur Marshall	2	4	6
(Denmark) Kurt Nielsen	6	6	8
Q	(Pakistan) Khwaja Saeed	2	1	4
(Netherlands) Hans van Dalsum	6	6	6
(Socialist Federal Republic of Yugoslavia) Stefán László	11	5	4	0^{r}
Q	(South Africa) Ian Froman	9	7	6	2

Second round
5	(Australia) R Hartwig	6	6	6
(United Kingdom) G Oakley	0	4	3
(South Africa) A Segal	6	6	6
(Argentina) A Russell	3	2	0
Q	(Australia) D Potter	6	2	2	7
(Denmark) K Nielsen	4	6	6	9
(Netherlands) J van Dalsum	6	6	2	1	4
Q	(South Africa) I Froman	3	3	6	6	6

Third round
5	(Australia) R Hartwig	6	4	4
(South Africa) A Segal	8	6	6
(Denmark) K Nielsen	6	6	6
Q	(South Africa) I Froman	3	1	2

Fourth round
(South Africa) A Segal	6	1	4	3
(Denmark) K Nielsen	4	6	6	6

=== Bottom half ===
==== Section 5 ====
First round
(United Kingdom) Geoff Ward	3	6	2	13	5
(Austria) Freddie Huber	6	3	6	11	7
(Socialist Federal Republic of Yugoslavia) Ilija Panajotović	6	6	6
(Pakistan) Rafiq Ahmad	2	3	4
(South Africa) Gordon Forbes	4	2	6	12	9
(Sweden) Lennart Bergelin	6	6	2	10	7
(United States) Herbie Flam	6	6	6
(Canada) Robert Bédard	3	2	2
(Argentina) Ernesto della Paolera	3	5	6	3
(United States) Sidney Schwartz	6	7	3	6
(United Kingdom) Bobby Wilson	6	6	6
(Denmark) Søren Højberg	4	1	3
Q	(West Germany) Peter Scholl	6	6	6
(United Kingdom) Robin Kipping	1	2	4
Q	(United States) George Druliner	4	3	1
7	(United States) Budge Patty	6	6	6

Second round
(Austria) A Huber	6	6	3	6
(Socialist Federal Republic of Yugoslavia) I Panajotović	4	4	6	3
(South Africa) G Forbes	w/o
(United States) H Flam
(United States) S Schwartz	1	4	2
(United Kingdom) R Wilson	6	6	6
Q	(West Germany) P Scholl	0	4	3
7	(United States) J Patty	6	6	6

Third round
(Austria) A Huber	6	2	4	2
(United States) H Flam	4	6	6	6
(United Kingdom) R Wilson	4	9	4	1
7	(United States) J Patty	6	7	6	6

Fourth round
(United States) H Flam	1	3	6	6	4
7	(United States) J Patty	6	6	4	1	6

==== Section 6 ====
First round
(Italy) Orlando Sirola	4	5	3
(United States) Art Larsen	6	7	6
(Hungary) István Sikorszki	9	3	6
(United States) Malcolm Fox	11	6	8
(South Africa) Owen Williams	6	6	7
(Uruguay) Arsenio Motolko	2	1	5
(United States) Donald Flye	6	5	1	6	4
(United Kingdom) Martin Hime	2	7	6	2	6
(Poland) Władysław Skonecki	6	6	6
(Netherlands) Fred Dehnert	3	2	2
(France) Jean-Claude Molinari	6	4	1	7	3
(United Kingdom) Geoffrey Paish	3	6	6	5	6
(United Kingdom) Eric Filby	3	10	0	3
(Belgium) Philippe Washer	6	8	6	6
(Australia) Bob Howe	5	5	2
4	(Australia) Lew Hoad	7	7	6

Second round
(United States) A Larsen	6	7	7
(United States) M Fox	2	5	5
(South Africa) O Williams	6	7	6
(United Kingdom) M Hime	4	5	2
(Poland) W Skonecki	6	6	6
(United Kingdom) G Paish	4	4	3
(Belgium) P Washer	1	3	2
4	(Australia) L Hoad	6	6	6

Third round
(United States) A Larsen	6	10	6
(South Africa) O Williams	2	8	2
(Poland) W Skonecki	3	3	4
4	(Australia) L Hoad	6	6	6

Fourth round
(United States) A Larsen	4	4	8	3
4	(Australia) L Hoad	6	6	6	6

==== Section 7 ====
First round
(Iran) Matthew Mohtadi	4	2	7	2
(United States) Bob Perry	6	6	5	6
(Austria) Hans Redl	6	7	4	6
(Indonesia) Liep-Tjiauw Tan	2	5	6	2
(Sweden) Staffan Stockenberg	6	6	1	6
(United States) Pablo Eisenberg	3	2	6	4
LL	(South Africa) Jack Forbes	3	4	2
(United Kingdom) John Horn	6	6	6
(United Kingdom) Gordon Mudge	3	4	0
(France) Robert Haillet	6	6	6
(Australia) Jack Arkinstall	6	6	6
(United Kingdom) Alan Mills	2	3	2
(Australia) Ashley Cooper	4	5	2
(Australia) Mervyn Rose	6	7	6
(Switzerland) René Buser	3	1	2
6	(Egypt) Jaroslav Drobný	6	6	6

Second round
(United States) R Perry	3	6	6	6
(Austria) H Redl	6	3	2	2
(Sweden) S Stockenberg	6	4
(United Kingdom) J Horn	3	0^{r}
(France) R Haillet	3	9	5	6	4
(Australia) J Arkinstall	6	7	7	4	6
(Australia) M Rose	4	6	9	4
6	(Egypt) J Drobný	6	3	11	6

Third round
(United States) R Perry	2	6	6	4	6
(Sweden) S Stockenberg	6	2	4	6	4
(Australia) J Arkinstall	4	6	2	9
6	(Egypt) J Drobný	6	2	6	11

Fourth round
(United States) R Perry	6	3	4
6	(Egypt) J Drobný	8	6	6

==== Section 8 ====
First round
(Spain) Emilio Martínez	6	3	6	3	3
(France) Philippe Chatrier	4	6	2	6	6
(South Africa) Ian Vermaak	4	6	6	6
(Chile) Andrés Hammersley	6	3	4	3
(India) Naresh Kumar	6	6	8
(Venezuela) Isaías Pimentel	3	1	6
(Australia) Bill Gilmour	6	6	6
(Republic of Ireland) Joe Hackett	0	4	1
(United States) Hugh Stewart	6	8	6
(Australia) Neale Fraser	2	6	4
(United Kingdom) Tony Starte	3	1	3
(Belgium) Jacques Brichant	6	6	6
(South Africa) Trevor Fancutt	3	6	6	6
(United Kingdom) Roger Becker	6	3	4	2
(Australia) Mal Anderson	3	4	2
1	(United States) Tony Trabert	6	6	6

Second round
(France) P Chatrier	1	1	1
(South Africa) I Vermaak	6	6	6
(India) N Kumar	3	6	8	6
(Australia) W Gilmour	6	4	6	2
(United States) H Stewart	6	3	6	8
(Belgium) J Brichant	2	6	3	6
(South Africa) T Fancutt	1	2	2
1	(United States) T Trabert	6	6	6

Third round
(South Africa) I Vermaak	3	2	6	7
(India) N Kumar	6	6	3	9
(United States) H Stewart	4	3	1
1	(United States) T Trabert	6	6	6

Fourth round
(India) N Kumar	4	2	2
1	(United States) T Trabert	6	6	6

Preceded by 1955 French Championships	Grand Slams; Men's Singles	Succeeded by 1955 U.S. Championships
