= Elaine Shenton =

British tennis player

- Country (sports): United Kingdom

Singles

Grand Slam singles results
- Wimbledon: 4R (1956)

Doubles

Grand Slam doubles results
- Wimbledon: 3R (1954, 1960)

Grand Slam mixed doubles results
- Wimbledon: 4R (1955)

Elaine Shenton (née Watson) is a British former tennis player.

== Career ==
Shenton grew up in Hertfordshire and was a British junior champion. She was doubles champion at the Italian championships in 1954, partnering Pat Ward. In 1955 she won the singles titles at both the Scottish Championships and Welsh Covered Court Championships. She was runner-up to Ann Haydon in the singles final at the North of England Championships in 1956. At the 1956 Wimbledon Championships, Shenton won through to the fourth round, before losing to eventual finalist Angela Buxton. In 1957 she won the Chapel Allerton Open in Leeds. She was ranked as high as sixth in Great Britain.
