= Joe Hackett (tennis) =

Irish tennis player (1925–2023)

- Full name: Joseph Dominic Hackett
- Country (sports): Ireland
- Born: 4 August 1925
- Died: 11 January 2023 (aged 97) Dublin, Ireland

Singles

Grand Slam singles results
- French Open: 1R (1950)
- Wimbledon: 1R (1950, 1951, 1952, 1953, 1955, 1956, 1957, 1958, 1959)
- US Open: 1R (1962)

Joseph Dominic Hackett (4 August 1925 – 11 January 2023), popularly known as J. D. Hackett, was an Irish player. He was also capped for Leinster in rugby union and captained Old Belvedere R.F.C.

Hackett, who made his first Irish Championship final aged 16, was active on the tennis circuit from the 1940s to the early 1960s. An Ireland Davis Cup player from 1950 to 1961, Hackett won four singles and four doubles rubbers, then later served the team as non playing captain. He was a regular participant at Wimbledon in the 1950s.

Hackett died in Dublin on 11 January 2023, at the age of 97.

== See also ==
- List of Ireland Davis Cup team representatives
