= Alfred Huber (tennis) =

Austrian tennis player

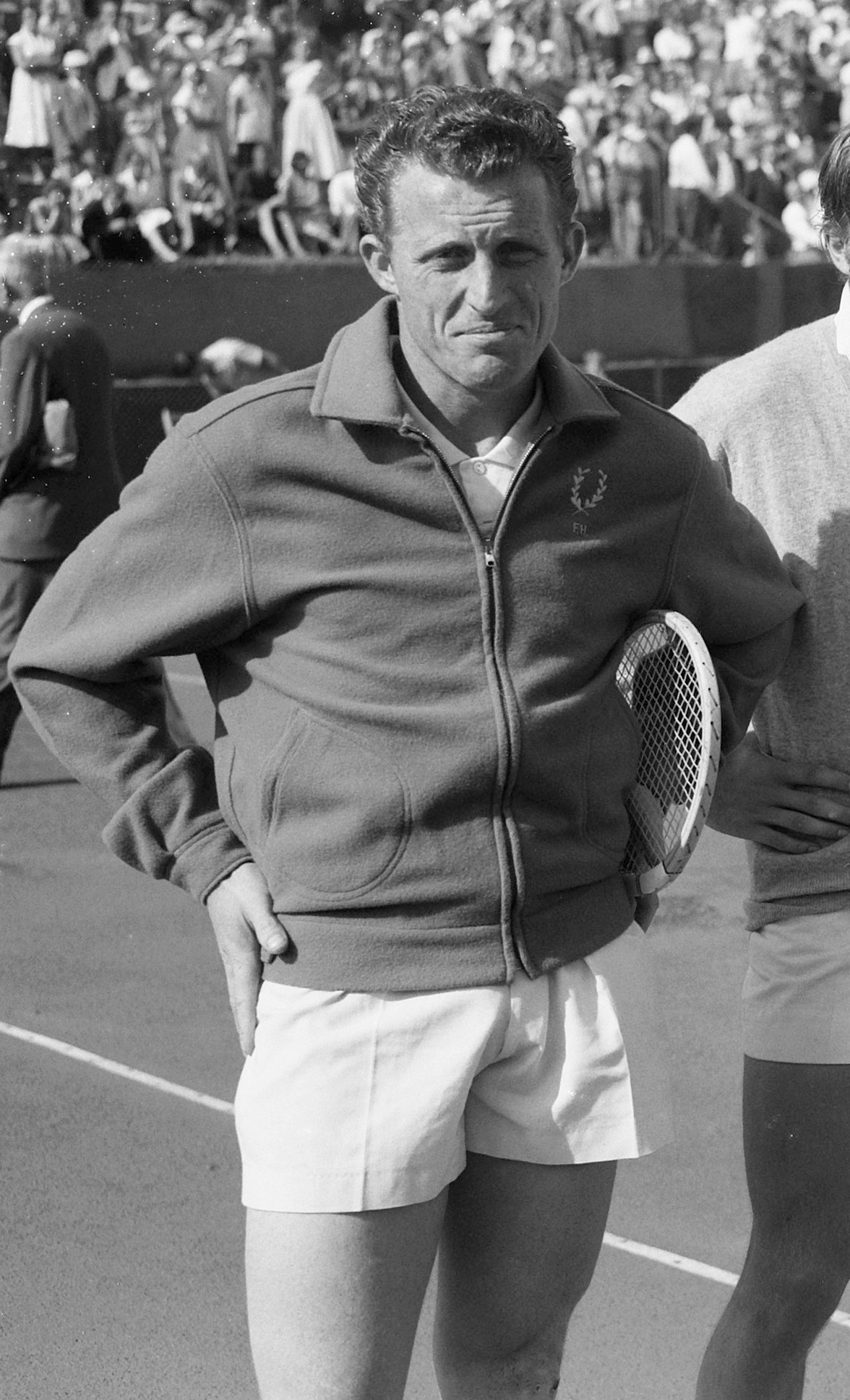
- Alfred Huber in 1957
- Country (sports): Austria
- Born: 15 May 1930 Vienna, Austria
- Died: 25 May 1972 (aged 42)

Singles

Grand Slam singles results
- Wimbledon: 3R (1950, 1952, 1955)

Doubles

Grand Slam doubles results
- Wimbledon: QF (1953)

Grand Slam mixed doubles results
- Wimbledon: 4R (1952, 1953)

Alfred "Freddie" Huber (15 May 1930 – 25 May 1972) was an Austrian tennis and ice hockey player. He began his tennis career in 1946. He won the British Covered Court Championships in 1956. He competed at Wimbledon in 1949–57, but never advanced through the third round. He competed in the hockey tournament at the 1948 Winter Olympics.
