= Lois Felix =

American tennis player

- Full name: Lois Lorraine Felix-Spencer
- Country (sports): United States
- Born: Meriden, Connecticut
- Died: December 23, 2001

Singles
- Highest ranking: No. 8 (U.S. Ranking)

Grand Slam singles results
- Wimbledon: 2R (1955)
- US Open: QF (1954)

Doubles

Grand Slam doubles results
- Wimbledon: 2R (1955)

Grand Slam mixed doubles results
- Wimbledon: 4R (1955)

Lois Lorraine Felix-Spencer (June 1, 1927 – December 23, 2001) was an American amateur tennis player in the 1950s and 1960s. At one time in her career, she was ranked No. 8 in the U.S. singles rankings.

At the U.S. Indoor Championships, Felix won the singles title in 1956 and 1959 and was a singles finalist in 1954, 1957, 1960 and 1962. She also was a doubles finalist in 1960.

At the Cincinnati Open, Felix was 10-0 in singles in two appearances, winning the singles titles in 1954 and 1957. She also won the 1957 doubles title with Margareta Bonstrom of Sweden.

She was inducted into the New England Tennis Hall of Fame in 1990.
