= Daphne Seeney =

Australian tennis player (1933–2020)

- Full name: Daphne Grace Seeney Fancutt
- Country (sports): Australia
- Born: 2 February 1933 Monto, Queensland, Australia
- Died: 18 September 2020 (aged 87)

Grand Slam singles results
- Australian Open: SF (1956)
- Wimbledon: 3R (1956, 1957)

Grand Slam doubles results
- Australian Open: SF (1956)
- Wimbledon: F (1956)

Grand Slam mixed doubles results
- Australian Open: 2R (1956)
- Wimbledon: SF (1956)

Daphne Seeney AM (2 February 1933 – 18 September 2020), married name Daphne Fancutt, was an Australian professional tennis player whose career spanned the 1950s.

Seeney was a doubles finalist in the 1956 Wimbledon Championships with partner Fay Muller; they were defeated in the final by Angela Buxton and Althea Gibson in straight sets.

In 1957, she married South African tennis player Trevor Fancutt in Johannesburg. Four years later, they moved to Brisbane and opened the Fancutts Tennis Centre, which they operated until 2015 when it was sold to make way for a retirement village. In January 1995, Seeney received the Member of the Order of Australia (AM) award "in recognition of service to the sport of tennis as a player, coach and administrator". In September 2000, she received the Australian Sports Medal.

Seeney died from natural causes on 18 September 2020, at the age of 87.

== Grand Slam finals ==
=== Doubles (1 runner-up) ===
Result	Year	Championship	Surface	Partner	Opponents	Score
Loss	1956	Wimbledon	Grass	(Australia) Fay Muller	(United Kingdom) Angela Buxton (United States) Althea Gibson	1–6, 6–8
