= Russell Seymour =

South African tennis player (born 1930)

- Country (sports): South Africa
- Born: July 8, 1930 (age 95) East London, South Africa
- Plays: Right–handed

Singles

Grand Slam singles results
- French Open: 2R (1953, 1955)
- Wimbledon: 2R (1955)

Russell Seymour (born July 8, 1930) is a South African–born former tennis player.

Seymour was born in East London, Cape Province, and grew up in Johannesburg, attending Parktown Boys' High School. He began taking tennis seriously at age 15 and in 1948 became the South African junior champion.

Active on tour in the 1950s, Seymour was the 1955 South African Open singles champion. He played a Davis Cup tie for South Africa in both 1953 and 1955, both times against Norway, and won three of his five rubbers. His career included main draw appearances at both Roland Garros and Wimbledon. He left the tour in 1956 to become a professional coach and had a period in charge of South Africa's junior Davis Cup team.

Seymour immigrated to Australia in the early 1970s, but ultimately settled in Texas, where he became director of a tennis club. He raised three children with wife Jean and remained active on the senior tennis circuit for many years.
