= Tennis at the Central American and Caribbean Games =

Tennis has been an event at the Central American and Caribbean Games since 1926. It was not held in Panama City in 1970, but has otherwise been a permanent sport. Cuba's Juan Pino is the most successful Central American and Caribbean Games tennis player of all time, in terms of medals won (12).

== Medal summary ==
=== Men's singles ===
Games	Gold	Silver	Bronze
1926	Alfonso Unda (MEX)	Mariano Lozano (MEX)	René Ruiz (CUB)
1930	Gustavo Vollmer (CUB)	Ricardo Tapia (MEX)	Ricardo Morales (CUB); Vicente Banet (CUB)
1935	Ricardo Morales (CUB)	Esteban Reyes (MEX)	Gustavo Vollmer (CUB)
1938	Donald Leahong (JAM)	Clinton Nunes (JAM)	Esteban Reyes (MEX)
1946	Anselmo Puente (MEX)	José Agüero (CUB)	William F. Coke (JAM)
1950	Gustavo Palafox (MEX)	Oscar Escobar (GUA)	Héctor Estrada (GUA)
1954	Mario Llamas (MEX)	Rafael Ortega (MEX)	Francisco Guerrero (MEX)
1959	Mario Llamas (MEX)	Francisco Contreras (MEX)	Antonio Palafox (MEX)
1962	Alan Price (TRI)	Juan Arredondo (MEX)	Adolfo Gómez (GUA)
1966	Rafael Osuna (MEX)	Stanley Pasarell (PUR)	Vicente Zarazúa (MEX)
1974	Emilio Montaño (MEX)	Freddy de Jesús (PUR)	Humberto Camarotti (CUB)
1978	Pedro González (PUR)	Javier Ordaz (MEX)	Abraham Sojo (VEN)
1982	Ronald Agénor (HAI)	Jorge Lozano (MEX)	Tomás Nido (PUR)
1986	Rafael Moreno (DOM)	Juan Pino (CUB)	Mario Tabares (CUB); Carlos Chávez (GUA)
1990	Luis Herrera (MEX)	Miguel Nido (PUR)	Juan Pino (CUB); Mario Tabares (CUB)
1993	Nicolás Pereira (VEN)	Oliver Fernández (MEX)	Juan Pino (CUB); Mario Tabares (CUB)
1998	Jimy Szymanski (VEN)	Ricardo Omaña (VEN)	Lázaro Navarro (CUB); Javier Gutiérrez (MEX)
2002	Michael Quintero (COL)	Kepler Orellana (VEN)	Miguel Gallardo (MEX); Marcello Amador (MEX)
2006	Jhonson García (DOM)	Yohny Romero (VEN)	Víctor Estrella (DOM); Pablo González (COL)
2010	Víctor Estrella (DOM)	Daniel Garza (MEX)	Bruno Rodríguez (MEX)
2010	Víctor Estrella (DOM)	Daniel Garza (MEX)	Marcelo Arévalo (ESA)
2014	Víctor Estrella (DOM)	José Hernández (DOM)	Nicolás Barrientos (COL)
2018	Víctor Estrella (DOM)	Roberto Cid (DOM)	Alejandro González (COL)
2023	Nick Hardt (DOM)	Roberto Cid (DOM)	Blaise Bicknell (JAM)

=== Men's doubles ===
Games	Gold	Silver	Bronze
1926	Alfonso Unda and Fernando Gerdes (MEX)	Mariano Lozano and Manuel Llano (MEX)	
1930	Alfonso Unda and Mariano Lozano (MEX)	Gustavo Vollmer and Germán Upmann (CUB)	Vicente Banet and Ricardo Morales (CUB); Ricardo Tapia and Manuel Llano (MEX)
1935	Ricardo Tapia and Alfonso Unda (MEX)	Gustavo Vollmer and Ricardo Morales (CUB)	Rafael Ayau and Oscar Quevedo (GUA)
1938	Esteban Reyes and Daniel Hernández (MEX)	Lorenzo Nodarse and José Agüero (CUB)	Carlos Bauer and Jorge Combariza (COL)
1946	Ricardo Morales and José Agüero (CUB)	George Stewart and Carlos Eleta (PAN)	Anselmo Puente and Francisco Galván (MEX)
1950	Gustavo Palafox and Francisco Guerrero (MEX)	Juan Weiss and Lorenzo Nodarse (CUB)	Carlos Pasarell and José L. Pasarell (PUR)
1954	Mario Llamas and Anselmo Puente (MEX)	Francisco Guerrero and Esteban Reyes Jr. (MEX)	Harry Faccini and Darío Behar (COL)
1959	Mario Llamas and Francisco Contreras (MEX)	Carlos Pasarell and Desiderio García (PUR)	Julio C. Rojas and Luis E. Rojas (CRC)
1962	Juan Arredondo and Vicente Zarazúa (MEX)	Juan Notz and Marcos Gambus (VEN)	Alan Price and Peter Valdez (TRI)
1966	Rafael Osuna and Luis García (MEX)	Stanley Pasarell and Alberto Carrero (PUR)	Humphrey Hose and Julio Moros (VEN)
1974	Pedro Chávez and Emilio Montaño (MEX)	Pedro Ast and Amable Peña (VEN)	Albert Richards and Gary Nelthropp (ISV)
1978	Juan Bóveda and Ismael Sauce (VEN)	Hernando Aguirre and Germán Valencia (COL)	Emilio Vázquez and Jaime Verd (DOM)
1982	Jorge Lozano and Fernando Pérez (MEX)	Tomás Nido and Miguel Nido (PUR)	Iñaki Calvo and Carlos Claverie (VEN)
1986	Miguel Nido and Juan Ríos (PUR)	Fernando Pérez and Ives Lemaitre (MEX)	Mario Tabares and Wilfredo Henry (CUB); Rafael Moreno and Juan Álvarez (DOM)
1990	Mario Tabares and Juan Pino (CUB)	Juan Ríos and Miguel Nido (PUR)	Francisco Maciel and Oliver Fernández (MEX); Juan Bianchi and Salvador Colvee (VEN)
1993	Agustín Moreno and Oliver Fernández (MEX)	Juan Pino and Mario Tabares (CUB)	Nicolás Pereira and Jimy Szymanski (VEN); Jaime Frontera and José Frontera (PUR)
1998	Alejandro Hernández and Marco Osorio (MEX)	Sixto Camacho and Rodrigo Vallejo (DOM)	Lázaro Navarro and Juan Pino (CUB); Jimy Szymanski and Ricardo Omaña (VEN)
2002	Bruno Echagaray and Santiago González (MEX)	Alejandro Falla and Carlos Salamanca (COL)	Shane Stone and Troy Stone (TRI); Kepler Orellana and Jimy Szymanski (VEN)
2006	Michael Quintero and Carlos Salamanca (COL)	Víctor Estrella and Jhonson García (DOM)	Ricardo Chile and Sandor Martínez (CUB); Daniel Garza and Carlos Palencia (MEX)
2010	José de Armas and Piero Luisi (VEN)	Luis Díaz Barriga and César Ramírez (MEX)	Alex Llompart and Jose Perdomo (PUR); Devin Mullings and Marvin Rolle (BAH)
2014	Juan Carlos Spir and Eduardo Struvay (COL)	Santiago González and César Ramírez (MEX)	Roberto Maytín and David Souto (VEN)
2018	Roberto Cid and Víctor Estrella (DOM)	Christopher Díaz Figueroa and Wilfredo González (GUA)	Nicolás Mejía and Eduardo Struvay (COL)
2023	Brandon Perez and Ricardo Rodriguez-Pace (VEN)	Rodrigo Crespo and Jesse Flores (CRC)	Roberto Cid and Nick Hardt (DOM)

=== Men's team ===
Games	Gold	Silver	Bronze
1986	Harry Sy Corvo; Harold Castillo; Rodolfo Benitez (VEN)	Daniel Chávez; Carlos Chávez; Fabio Sical (GUA)	Miguel Nido; Juan Ríos; José Castillo (PUR); Fernando Pérez; Ives Lemaitre; Gerardo Hernández (MEX)
1990	Luis Herrera; Oliver Fernández; Francisco Maciel (MEX)	Mario Tabares; Juan Pino; Wilfredo Henry (CUB)	Miguel Merz; Manuel Tejada; Jose Pineda (ESA); Stephen Alger and William Wray (BER)
1993	Nicolás Pereira; Jimy Szymanski; Ricardo Omaña (VEN)	Agustín Moreno; Oliver Fernández; Rafael Rangel; Enrique Abaroa (MEX)	Juan Pino; Mario Tabares; Armando Pérez (CUB); Allan Lopez; Miguel Merz; Augusto Martin; Manuel Tejada (ESA)
1998	Lázaro Navarro; Juan Pino; Sandor Martínez (CUB)	Enrique Abaroa; Javier Gutiérrez; Alejandro Hernández; Marco Osorio (MEX)	Sixto Camacho; Rodrigo Vallejo; Jhonson García; Jorge Dueñas (DOM); Raul Bermudez; Ricardo Omaña; Kepler Orellana; Jimy Szymanski (VEN)
2002	Marcello Amador; Bruno Echagaray; Miguel Gallardo; Santiago González (MEX)	Víctor Estrella; Jhonson García (DOM)	Jhonnatan Medina; Kepler Orellana; Jimy Szymanski (VEN); Alejandro Falla; Pablo González; Michael Quintero; Carlos Salamanca (COL)
2014	Nicolás Barrientos; Eduardo Struvay; Juan Carlos Spir (COL)	Christopher Díaz Figueroa; Wilfredo González; Stefan González; Christopher Vleeming (GUA)	Luis David Martínez; David Souto; Jesús Bandrés; Roberto Maytín (VEN)
2018	Roberto Cid; Víctor Estrella Burgos; Nick Hardt; José Olivares (DOM)	Christopher Díaz Figueroa; Stefan González; Wilfredo González (GUA)	Alejandro González; Sergio Hernández; Nicolás Mejía; Eduardo Struvay (COL)
2023	Nick Hardt; Roberto Cid; Nick Hardt; Peter Bertran (DOM)	Alejandro Hoyos; Johan Rodríguez; Nicolás Buitrago; Cristian Rodríguez (COL)	Ricardo Rodriguez-Pace; Brandon Perez; Rafael Abdul (VEN)

=== Women's singles ===
Games	Gold	Silver	Bronze
1935	María Tapia (MEX)	María del Carmen Camacho (CUB)	Elena Daly (CUB)
1938	Raquel Moch (MEX)	Esperanza Belmar (MEX)	Loris Leyden (JAM)
1946	Carmen Christlies (MEX)	Hilde Heyn (MEX)	Enma R. Gutiérrez (MEX)
1950	Hilde Heyn (MEX)	Melita Ramírez (MEX)	Carmen Christlies (MEX)
1954	Melita Ramírez (MEX)	Rosie Reyes (MEX)	Yolanda Ramírez (MEX)
1959	Yolanda Ramírez (MEX)	Melita Ramírez (MEX)	Rosie Reyes (MEX)
1962	Antonia Prado (MEX)	Elena Osuna (MEX)	Marta Torros (PUR)
1966	Elena Subirats (MEX)	Patricia Montaño (MEX)	Olga Montaño (MEX)
1974	Gina Diaz (MEX)	Aleida Spex (CUB)	Cecilia Rosado (MEX)
1978	Alejandra Vallejo (MEX)	Maluca Llamas (MEX)	Marlin Noriega (VEN)
1982	Claudia Hernández (MEX)	Gigi Fernández (PUR)	Heliane Steden (MEX)
1986	Crissy Gonzalez (PUR)	Marilda Julia (PUR)	Belkis Rodríguez (CUB); Madeleine Sánchez (DOM)
1990	Joelle Schad (DOM)	Rita Pichardo (CUB)	Ninfa Marra (VEN); Emilie Viqueira (PUR)
1993	Xóchitl Escobedo (MEX)	María Francesa (VEN)	Noelia Serra (DOM); Ninfa Marra (VEN)
1998	María Vento (VEN)	Milagros Sequera (VEN)	Emilie Viqueira (PUR); Giana Gutiérrez (COL)
2002	Kristina Brandi (PUR)	Vilmarie Castellvi (PUR)	Karin Palme (MEX); Melissa Torres Sandoval (MEX)
2006	Kristina Brandi (PUR)	Milagros Sequera (VEN)	Daniela Múñoz Gallegos (MEX); Melissa Torres Sandoval (MEX)
2010	Monica Puig (PUR)	Adriana Pérez (VEN)	Larika Russell (BAH)
2010	Monica Puig (PUR)	Adriana Pérez (VEN)	Alejandra Granillo (MEX)
2014	Monica Puig (PUR)	Ana Sofía Sánchez (MEX)	Francesca Segarelli (DOM)
2018	Monica Puig (PUR)	Mariana Duque Mariño (COL)	Giuliana Olmos (MEX)
2023	María Herazo González (COL)	Yuliana Lizarazo (COL)	Maria Navarro (MEX)

=== Women's doubles ===
Games	Gold	Silver	Bronze
1935	María del Carmen Camacho and Elena Daly (CUB)	Fernanda Cedillo and María Tapia (MEX)	Edelmira Duenas and Enriqueta Araujo (ESA)
1938	Raquel Moch and Esperanza Belmar (MEX)	Cristina Egul and Carmen Urbaneja (VEN)	Loris Leyden and Jean F. McNair (JAM)
1946	Carmen Christlies and Esther Reyes (MEX)	Flor Isava and Marion Schlageter (VEN)	Ivy Cover and Hope Bunting (JAM)
1950	Carmen Christlies and Hilde Heyn (MEX)	Sibylla Garbrecht and Alicia de Linares (COL)	Carmen Nottebohn and Clara de Echevarria (GUA)
1954	Melita Ramírez and Yolanda Ramírez (MEX)	María Tapia and Rosie Reyes (MEX)	Pilar Herrero and Mirta de la Paz (CUB)
1959	Yolanda Ramírez and Rosie Reyes (MEX)	Grace Valdes and Cindy Colbert (PUR)	Mónica Adler and Cristina Egul (VEN)
1962	Antonia Prado and Elena Osuna (MEX)	Josefina Cabrera and Cindy Colbert (PUR)	Jean Passailaigue and Rosemary Desnoes (JAM)
1966	Olga Montaño and Patricia Montaño (MEX)	Antonieta Garcia and Julia Garcia (GUA)	Cindy Villanueva and Eileen Pomales (PUR)
1974	Cecilia Rosado and Gina Diaz (MEX)	Wendy Hitt and Maria de Annexy (PUR)	Aleida Spex and Iluminada Concepción (CUB)
1978	Marlin Noriega and Mary Boveda (VEN)	Lourdes Diaz and Alejandra Vallejo (MEX)	Paula Hernández and Iluminada Concepción (CUB)
1982	Gigi Fernández and Marilda Julia (PUR)	Nuria Alasia and Claudia Bergiani (VEN)	Odalis Moreno and Belkis Rodríguez (CUB)
1986	María García and Belkis Rodríguez (CUB)	Adriana Hernández and Monica Muñoz (MEX)	Crissy Gonzalez and Marilda Julia (PUR); Adriana Isaza and Gloria Escobar (COL)
1990	Lupita Novelo and Aránzazu Gallardo (MEX)	Rita Pichardo and Iluminada Concepción (CUB)	Monica Aguero and Florea de Maria Urrea (GUA); Joelle Schad and Madeleine Sánchez (DOM)
1993	María Francesa and Ninfa Marra (VEN)	Joelle Schad and Noelia Serra (DOM)	Lucila Becerra and Lupita Novelo (MEX); Belkis Rodríguez and Yoannis Montesino (CUB)
1998	María Vento and Milagros Sequera (VEN)	Melody Falcó and Paola Palencia (MEX)	Yoannis Montesino and Yamile Cordova (CUB); Alanna Broderick and Camille Walter (JAM)
2002	Vilmarie Castellvi and Mari Toro (PUR)	Erika Clarke and Melissa Torres Sandoval (MEX)	Mariela Salinas and Stephanie Schaer (VEN); Liz Cruz and Ana Osorio (ESA)
2006	Mariana Muci and Milagros Sequera (VEN)	Yanet Núñez Mojarena and Yamilé Fors (CUB)	Erika Clarke and Valeria Pulido (MEX); Kristina Brandi and Vilmarie Castellvi (PUR)
2010	Nikkita Fountain and Larika Russell (BAH)	Daysi Espinal and Francesca Segarelli (DOM)	Melissa Golfin and Camila Quesada (CRC); Andrea Gámiz and Mariana Muci (VEN)
2014	Victoria Rodríguez and Marcela Zacarías (MEX)	Andrea Gámiz and Adriana Pérez (VEN)	Melissa Morales and Daniela Schippers (GUA)
2018	Fernanda Contreras and Giuliana Olmos (MEX)	Mariana Duque Mariño and Camila Osorio (COL)	Mónica Matías and Monica Puig (PUR)
2023	Yuliana Lizarazo; María Paulina Pérez (COL)	Jessica Hinojosa; Maria Navarro (MEX)	Maria Morales; Kirsten-Andrea Weedon (GUA)

=== Women's team ===
Games	Gold	Silver	Bronze
1986	Monica Muñoz; Claudia Hernández; Zarina Galván (MEX)	Madeleine Sánchez; Miriam Hache; Dahiana Paulino (DOM)	Ingrid Gonesh; Yolanda Van Rosberg (AHO); Marilda Julia; Crissy Gonzalez; Emilie Viqueira (PUR)
1990	Lupita Novelo; Isabela Petrov; Aránzazu Gallardo (MEX)	Joelle Schad; Madeleine Sánchez (DOM)	Rita Pichardo; Iluminada Concepción; Belkis Rodríguez (CUB); María Francesa; Ninfa Marra; Eleonora Vegliante (VEN)
1993	Joelle Schad; Noelia Serra (DOM)	Lucila Becerra; Xóchitl Escobedo; Lupita Novelo (MEX)	María Francesa; Ninfa Marra; Helene Kappler (VEN); Belkis Rodríguez; Yoannis Montesino; Yamile Cordova (CUB)
1998	Nelly Pardo; Milagros Sequera; María Vento (VEN)	Melody Falcó; Paola Palencia; Karin Palme; Graciela Vélez (MEX)	Yoannis Montesino; Yamile Cordova; Yanet Núñez (CUB); Elena Delucca; Mari Toro; Emilie Viqueira (PUR)
2002	Kristina Brandi; Vilmarie Castellvi (PUR)	Karin Palme; Alejandra Rivero; Melissa Torres Sandoval (MEX)	Glenny Cepeda; Daisy Espinal; Diana Espinal (DOM); Liz Cruz; Ana Osorio; Marcela Rodezno (ESA)
2014	Ana Sofía Sánchez; Marcela Zacarías; Victoria Rodríguez; Renata Zarazúa (MEX)	Adriana Pérez; Andrea Gámiz; Mariaryeni Gutiérrez; Aymet Uzcátegui (VEN)	Melissa Morales; Andrea Weedon; Daniela Schippers; Rebeca Reyes (GUA)
2018	Mariana Duque Mariño; María Herazo González; Camila Osorio; María Paulina Pérez (COL)	Fernanda Contreras; Giuliana Olmos; Andrea Renee Villarreal (MEX)	Melissa Morales; María Rivera; Daniela Schippers; Andrea Weedon (GUA)
2023	María Herazo González; Yuliana Lizarazo; Yuliana Monroy; María Paulina Pérez (COL)	Maria Navarro; Jessica Hinojosa; Maria Martinez (MEX)	Siham Richmagui; Daniela Obando; Natalie Espinal; Alejandra Obando (HON)

=== Mixed doubles ===
Games	Gold	Silver	Bronze
1935	María Tapia and Alfonso Unda (MEX)	Elena Daly and Lorenzo Nodarse (CUB)	Edelmira Duenas and Mauricio Lopez (ESA)
1938	Loris Leyden and Harold Dayes (JAM)	Helie Dittel and Ricardo Saprissa (CRC)	Raquel Moch and Daniel Hernandez (MEX)
1946	Hope Bunting and William F. Coke (JAM)	Andreina Pietri and Carlos López (VEN)	Hilde Heyn and Francisco Galván (MEX)
1950	Melita Ramírez and Gustavo Palafox (MEX)	Carmen Nottebohn and Héctor Estrada (GUA)	Sibylla Garbrecht and Jorge Combariza (COL)
1954	Melita Ramírez and Mario Llamas (MEX)	María Tapia and Anselmo Puente (MEX)	Andreina Pietri and Carlos López (VEN)
1959	Yolanda Ramírez and Gustavo Palafox (MEX)	Cindy Colbert and Carlos Pasarell (PUR)	Mónica Adler and Juan Notz (VEN)
1962	Cindy Colbert and Juan Ríos (PUR)	Antonia Prado and Juan Arredondo (MEX)	Ria Chong and Michael Valdez (TRI)
1966	Elena Subirats and Vicente Zarazúa (MEX)	Eileen Pomales and Stanley Pasarell (PUR)	Beatriz Raytler and Eduardo Alvarez (VEN)
1974	Aleida Spex and Juan Pérez (CUB)	Maria de Annexy and Manuel Diaz (PUR)	Cecilia Rosado and Emilio Montaño (MEX)
1978	Crissy Gonzalez and Pedro González (PUR)	Alejandra Vallejo and Javier Ordaz (MEX)	Iluminada Concepción and Humberto Camarotti (CUB)
1982	Nuria Alasia and Iñaki Calvo (VEN)	Valeria Garip and Rafael Moreno (DOM)	Gigi Fernández and Miguel Nido (PUR)
1986	Belkis Rodríguez and Mario Tabares (CUB)	Madeleine Sánchez and Rafael Moreno (DOM)	Claudia Hernández and Fernando Perez (MEX); Henriette Gemer and Harry Sy Corvo (VEN)
1990	Lupita Novelo and Luis Herrera (MEX)	Emilie Viqueira and Jaime Frontera (PUR)	Belkis Rodríguez and Juan Pino (CUB); Joelle Schad and Rafael Moreno (DOM)
1993	Lupita Novelo and Oliver Fernández (MEX)	Ninfa Marra and Jimy Szymanski (VEN)	Joelle Schad and Hiram Silfa (DOM); Belkis Rodríguez and Juan Pino (CUB)
1998	María Vento and Jimy Szymanski (VEN)	Graciela Vélez and Javier Gutiérrez (MEX)	Yoannis Montesino and Juan Pino (CUB); Joelle Schad and Jhonson García (DOM)
2002	Gabriel Montilla and Kristina Brandi (PUR)	Santiago González and Melissa Torres Sandoval (MEX)	Iphton Louis and Neyssa Etienne (HAI); Jhonnatan Medina and Stephanie Schaer (VEN)
2006	Yohny Romero and Milagros Sequera (VEN)	Gilberto Álvarez and Vilmarie Castellvi (PUR)	Ricardo Chile and Yamilé Fors (CUB); Víctor Estrella and Daysi Espinal (DOM)
2010	Daniel Garza and Melissa Torres Sandoval (MEX)	José de Armas and Adriana Pérez (VEN)	Alex Llompart and Monica Puig (PUR)
2010	Daniel Garza and Melissa Torres Sandoval (MEX)	José de Armas and Adriana Pérez (VEN)	José Hernández and Chandra Capozzi (DOM)
2014	Marcela Zacarías and Santiago González (MEX)	Adriana Pérez and David Souto (VEN)	Francesca Segarelli and Víctor Estrella Burgos (DOM)
2018	Eduardo Struvay and María Paulina Pérez (COL)	José Olivares and Kelly Williford (DOM)	Alan Núñez Aguilera and Andrea Renee Villarreal (MEX)
2023	Peter Bertran and Kelly Williford (DOM)	Cristian Rodríguez and María Paulina Pérez (COL)	Sebastian Dominguez; Kiristen Weedon (GUA)

== See also ==
- Tennis at the Pan American Games
