= Jo Durie =

British tennis player (born 1960)

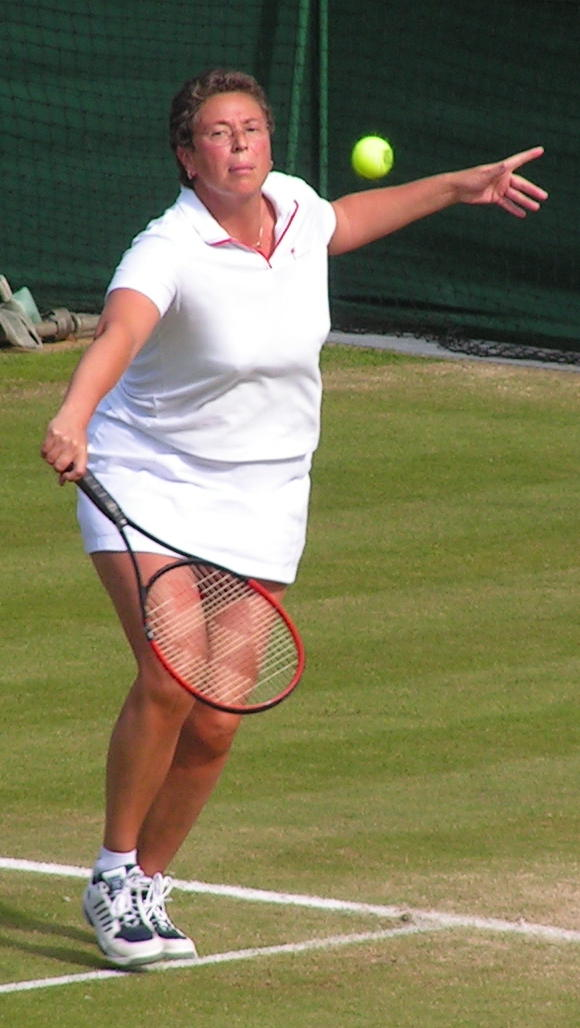
- Durie playing in the Ladies' Invitation Doubles final at Wimbledon in 2004
- Country (sports): (United Kingdom) Great Britain
- Residence: London, England
- Born: 27 July 1960 (age 66) Bristol, England
- Height: 1.83 m (6 ft 0 in)
- Turned pro: 1977
- Retired: 1995
- Plays: Right-handed (one-handed backhand)
- Prize money: $1,224,016

Singles
- Career record: 321–305
- Career titles: 2
- Highest ranking: No. 5 (9 July 1984)

Grand Slam singles results
- Australian Open: QF (1983)
- French Open: SF (1983)
- Wimbledon: QF (1984)
- US Open: SF (1983)

Other tournaments
- Tour Finals: 1R (1984)

Doubles
- Career record: 274–199
- Career titles: 5
- Highest ranking: No. 9 (December 1983)

Grand Slam doubles results
- Australian Open: SF (1985)
- French Open: SF (1983)
- Wimbledon: SF (1983, 1984)
- US Open: QF (1987, 1991)

Other doubles tournaments
- Tour Finals: F (1984)

Mixed doubles
- Career titles: 2

Grand Slam mixed doubles results
- Australian Open: W (1991)
- Wimbledon: W (1987)
- US Open: SF (1991)

Team competitions
- Fed Cup: F (1981)

Joanna Mary Durie (born 27 July 1960) is a British former tennis player. Her highest singles ranking was world number five; in doubles she reached number nine, and won two Grand Slam titles, both in the mixed doubles with Jeremy Bates.

Born in Bristol, England, Jo Durie was the last British woman to reach the semifinal of a Grand Slam tournament until Johanna Konta reached the semifinal of the 2016 Australian Open, and the last British woman to win a major title in any discipline, until Heather Watson won the 2016 Wimbledon mixed doubles title with Henri Kontinen.

== Singles career ==
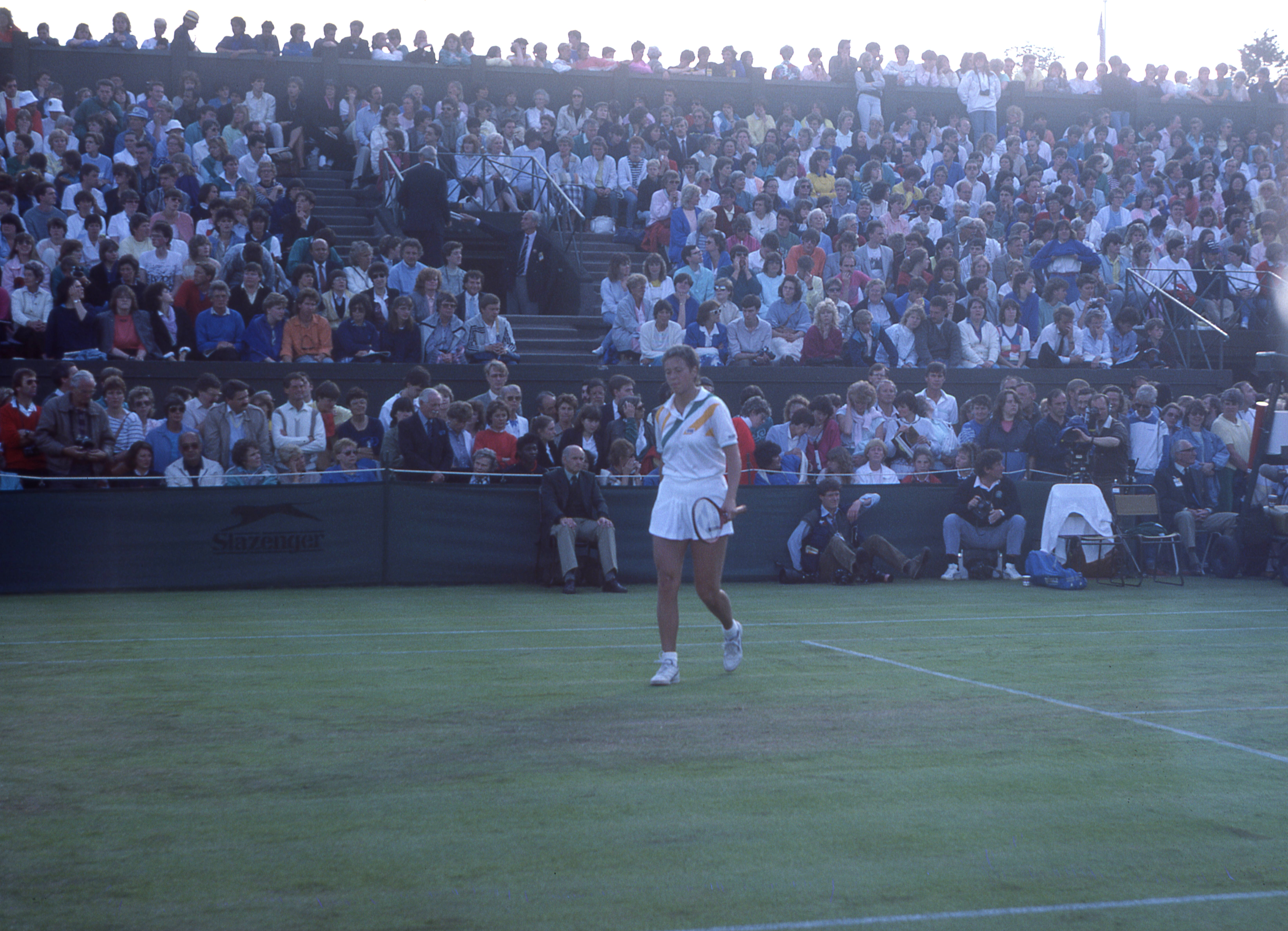
Durie at Wimbledon in 1987

After a successful junior career which included winning junior British titles on all three surfaces (grass, hard court and indoor) in 1976; Jo Durie turned professional in 1977, and played her first match at Wimbledon that year against the eventual champion Virginia Wade. In 1980 Durie suffered a major back injury which kept her out of the game for eight months. However, she made a successful return to the woman's tennis circuit in 1981, reaching the fourth round of the singles at Wimbledon and the US Open and climbing to her highest singles ranking so far of 31.

Her most successful year as a singles player was 1983, ending the season at No. 6 in the world rankings and on the prize money leader board. As an unseeded player Durie reached the semifinals of the French Open, beating both Pam Shriver and Tracy Austin along the way. Later that year she made another Grand Slam singles semifinal appearance at the US Open, where she eventually lost to Chris Evert in straight sets. Her dramatic rise up the singles rankings that year ended with a quarterfinal at the Australian Open in December. Durie's success as a singles player during 1983 gained her a coveted place at the 1984 WTA Tour Championship as the fifth seed.

Her most successful year at Wimbledon as a singles player came in 1984 when she reached the quarterfinals, beating a 15-year-old Steffi Graf in a memorable fourth-round match. It was just after Wimbledon that she reached a career-high singles ranking of world No. 5.

She won two top-level WTA singles titles (both in 1983) at Mahwah, New Jersey and Sydney, and had career wins over Steffi Graf, Zina Garrison, Pam Shriver, Hana Mandlíková, and Tracy Austin. Further back injuries in 1989 led to a remodeling of her service action. Durie made her last appearance in a WTA tour singles final at the Virginia Slims of Newport tournament in 1990. In 1991 at the age of 30, and one of the oldest singles competitors that year, she had another successful run to the fourth round of the US Open.

She was ranked the No. 1 British player for most of her career. She won the British National Singles title a record seven times. She was the second British woman player after Virginia Wade to win $1 million in prize money.

== Doubles career ==
Partnering her fellow British player Jeremy Bates, Durie won the mixed doubles title at Wimbledon in 1987, the first British doubles team to win the title for fifty-one years. In 1991 they became the first British doubles team ever to win the Australian Open mixed doubles title. As of 2013 both of these records still stand. As a team Bates and Durie reached an additional three mixed doubles quarterfinals at Wimbledon in 1986, 1990 and 1993. They also reached the quarter-finals of the Australian Open in 1992 as defending champions.

Durie would go on to win five woman's doubles titles from eighteen finals during her career. Her most successful year as a doubles player, aside from the Grand Slams in 1987 and 1991 was in 1983, when she reached six finals, winning three titles. Durie also reached the semifinals of the women's doubles at the French Open and Wimbledon. By virtue of this success she gained a place at the 1984 WTA Tour Championship in doubles, and reached the final partnering Ann Kiyomura.

Durie won the British National Doubles title a record nine times.

== Team tennis ==
Durie was a stalwart member of the British Wightman Cup (1979, 1981–89), British Federation Cup (1981–95) and British European Cup teams (1989–92). Durie was the youngest member of the British Federation Cup team, alongside Virginia Wade and Sue Barker, which reached the team final in 1981. Durie led the British team to victory in the European Championship in Prague in 1992.

== Retirement ==
Durie retired from competitive tennis at the Wimbledon Championships in 1995, (her 18th appearance at the Championships), and marked it with a memorable performance. After three successive operations on her left knee, Durie went into the Championships ranked No. 326 in the world, yet reached the second round of the ladies' singles. She beat France's Alexia Dechaume-Balleret, ranked No. 85 in the world, in straight sets in the first round. Her second round, and last singles match at Wimbledon, was against Jana Novotná. Her last match at Wimbledon was a mixed doubles match on Centre Court, where she played alongside her long-standing partner Jeremy Bates.

She is among the players with a winning record against Steffi Graff, leading 4–3 in head-to-heads.

After retiring from the professional tour, Durie had heart surgery to rectify a problem for which she had originally been prescribed Beta blockers early in her career. She did not take the prescribed medication, as she didn't feel well after taking them. She revealed this fact in March 2016 in an interview with BBC Radio 5 Live, after the revelation that Maria Sharapova had been found taking a similar heart-issue drug, which later had been banned by the World Anti-Doping Agency.

Since retirement, Durie has worked as a TV tennis commentator for both the BBC and British Eurosport. Durie was part of the BBC's commentary team up to and including the 2026 Wimbledon Championships, during which she announced her retirement from commentary duties after 30 years.

She used to coach British number one Elena Baltacha alongside her own former coach Alan Jones. She won back-to-back Wimbledon Ladies' Senior Invitation doubles titles in 1996 and 1997.

== Significant finals ==
=== Grand Slam tournaments ===
==== Mixed doubles: 2 (2 titles) ====
Result	Year	Championship	Surface	Partner	Opponents	Score
Win	1987	Wimbledon	Grass	(United Kingdom) Jeremy Bates	(Australia) Nicole Provis (Australia) Darren Cahill	7–6^{(12–10)}, 6–3
Win	1991	Australian Open	Hard	(United Kingdom) Jeremy Bates	(United States) Robin White (United States) Scott Davis	2–6, 6–4, 6–4

=== Year-end championships ===
==== Doubles: 1 (runner–up) ====
Result	Year	Championship	Surface	Partner	Opponents	Score
Loss	1984	New York	Carpet (i)	(United States) Ann Kiyomura	(United States) Martina Navratilova (United States) Pam Shriver	3–6, 1–6

== WTA career finals ==
=== Singles: 6 (2–4) ===
Legend
Tier I (0–0)
Tier II (0–0)
Tier III (0–1)
Tier IV (0–0)
Tier V (0–0)
Virginia Slims, Avon, other (2–3)

Result	W/L	Date	Tournament	Surface	Opponent	Score
Loss	0–1	Jun 1980	Beckenham, UK	Grass	(United States) Andrea Jaeger	4–6, 1–6
Loss	0–2	Feb 1982	Greenville, U.S.	Hard (i)	(Brazil) Cláudia Monteiro	4–6, 6–3, 4–6
Win	1–2	Aug 1983	Mahwah, U.S.	Hard	(Czechoslovakia) Hana Mandlíková	2–6, 7–5, 6–4
Loss	1–3	Oct 1983	Brighton, UK	Carpet (i)	(United States) Chris Evert-Lloyd	1–6, 1–6
Win	2–3	Nov 1983	Sydney, Australia	Grass	(United States) Kathy Jordan	6–3, 7–5
Loss	2–4	Jul 1990	Newport, U.S.	Grass	(Spain) Arantxa Sánchez Vicario	6–7^{(2–7)}, 6–4, 5–7

=== Doubles: 18 (5–13) ===
Legend
Tour Championships (0–1)
Tier I (0–0)
Tier II (0–3)
Tier III (0–1)
Tier IV (1–0)
Tier V (0–1)
Virginia Slims, Avon, other (4–7)

Result	W/L	Date	Tournament	Surface	Partner	Opponents	Score
Loss	1.	Jun 1979	Beckenham, UK	Grass	(United Kingdom) Debbie Jevans	(Australia) Elizabeth Little (Australia) Kerryn Pratt	1–6, 4–6
Win	1.	Jun 1982	Birmingham, UK	Grass	(United Kingdom) Anne Hobbs	(United States) Rosie Casals (Australia) Wendy Turnbull	6–3, 6–2
Loss	2.	Jan 1983	Houston, U.S.	Carpet (I)	(United States) Barbara Potter	(United States) Martina Navratilova (United States) Pam Shriver	4–6, 3–6
Win	2.	Mar 1983	Boston, U.S.	Carpet (i)	(United States) Ann Kiyomura	(United States) Kathy Jordan (United States) Anne Smith	6–3, 6–1
Win	3.	May 1983	Berlin, Germany	Clay	(United Kingdom) Anne Hobbs	(West Germany) Claudia Kohde-Kilsch (West Germany) Eva Pfaff	6–4, 7–6
Loss	3.	Jun 1983	Eastbourne, UK	Grass	(United Kingdom) Anne Hobbs	(United States) Martina Navratilova (United States) Pam Shriver	1–6, 0–6
Win	4.	Aug 1983	Mahwah, U.S.	Hard	(United States) Sharon Walsh	(South Africa) Rosalyn Fairbank (United States) Candy Reynolds	4–6, 7–5, 6–3
Loss	4.	Oct 1983	Brighton, UK	Carpet (i)	(United States) Ann Kiyomura	(United States) Chris Evert-Lloyd (United States) Pam Shriver	5–7, 4–6
Loss	5.	Feb 1984	Livingston, U.S.	Carpet (i)	(United States) Ann Kiyomura	(United States) Martina Navratilova (United States) Pam Shriver	4–6, 3–6
Loss	6.	Feb 1984	VS Championships, U.S.	Carpet (i)	(United States) Ann Kiyomura	(United States) Martina Navratilova (United States) Pam Shriver	3–6, 1–6
Loss	7.	Jun 1984	Eastbourne, UK	Grass	(United States) Ann Kiyomura	(United States) Martina Navratilova (United States) Pam Shriver	4–6, 2–6
Loss	8.	Aug 1984	Mahwah, U.S.	Hard	(United States) Ann Kiyomura	(United States) Martina Navratilova (United States) Pam Shriver	6–7^{(3–7)}, 6–3, 2–6
Loss	9.	Mar 1989	Boca Raton, U.S.	Hard	(United States) Mary Joe Fernández	(Czechoslovakia) Jana Novotná (Czechoslovakia) Helena Suková	4–6, 2–6
Win	5.	Apr 1990	Singapore	Hard	(Canada) Jill Hetherington	(France) Pascale Paradis (France) Catherine Suire	6–4, 6–1
Loss	10.	Sep 1990	Leipzig, Germany	Carpet (i)	(Netherlands) Manon Bollegraf	(South Africa) Lise Gregory (United States) Gretchen Magers	2–6, 6–4, 3–6
Loss	11.	Oct 1990	Brighton, UK	Carpet (i)	(Soviet Union) Natasha Zvereva	(Czechoslovakia) Helena Suková (France) Nathalie Tauziat	1–6, 4–6
Loss	12.	Sep 1991	St. Petersburg, Russia	Carpet (i)	(France) Isabelle Demongeot	(Soviet Union) Elena Brioukhovets (Soviet Union) Natalia Medvedeva	5–7, 3–6
Loss	13.	Feb 1993	Paris, France	Carpet (i)	(France) Catherine Suire	(Czech Republic) Jana Novotná (Czech Republic) Andrea Strnadová	6–7^{(2–7)}, 2–6

== Grand Slam performance timelines ==
Key
W	F	SF	QF	#R	RR	Q#	DNQ	A	NH

(W) winner; (F) finalist; (SF) semifinalist; (QF) quarterfinalist; (#R) rounds 4, 3, 2, 1; (RR) round-robin stage; (Q#) qualification round; (DNQ) did not qualify; (A) absent; (NH) not held; (SR) strike rate (events won / competed); (W–L) win–loss record.

=== Singles ===
Tournament	1977		1978	1979	1980	1981	1982	1983	1984	1985	1986	1987	1988	1989	1990	1991	1992	1993	1994	1995
Australian Open	A	A	A	A	A	3R	3R	QF	2R	3R	NH	4R	2R	3R	2R	2R	2R	A	A	A
French Open	A		A	A	1R	1R	2R	SF	2R	1R	1R	1R	2R	1R	A	1R	3R	A	A	A
Wimbledon	1R		1R	2R	1R	4R	1R	3R	QF	4R	3R	3R	2R	A	1R	2R	1R	1R	1R	2R
US Open	A		A	A	A	4R	3R	SF	1R	1R	3R	2R	1R	1R	1R	4R	1R	1R	A	A
Year-end ranking	NR		123	73	53	31	28	8	24	26	24	73	60	118	64	60	60	192	343	292

=== Doubles ===
Tournament	1977		1978	1979	1980	1981	1982	1983	1984	1985	1986	1987	1988	1989	1990	1991	1992	1993	1994	1995
Australian Open	A	A	A	A	A	2R	2R	QF	2R	SF	NH	QF	1R	QF	1R	1R	2R	A	A	A
French Open	A		A	A	1R	3R	3R	SF	1R	A	2R	A	A	2R	A	A	A	A	A	A
Wimbledon	1R		A	3R	1R	1R	2R	SF	SF	QF	1R	1R	3R	A	2R	1R	2R	2R	1R	2R
US Open	A		A	2R	A	3R	2R	2R	3R	2R	1R	QF	2R	2R	1R	QF	2R	2R	A	A
Year-end ranking									10	25	42	43	43	36	39	70	84	51	215	186

=== Mixed doubles ===
Tournament	1977		1978	1979	1980	1981	1982	1983	1984	1985	1986	1987	1988	1989	1990	1991	1992	1993	1994	1995	Career SR
Australian Open	A	A	A	A	A	A	A	A	A	A	NH	A	A	A	SF	W	QF	A	A	A	1 / 3
French Open	A		A	A	A	A	A	A	A	A	A	A	A	A	A	A	A	A	A	A	0 / 0
Wimbledon	1R		1R	A	2R	3R	2R	3R	A	QF	QF	W	2R	A	QF	3R	3R	QF	2R	2R	1 / 16
US Open	A		A	A	A	A	A	A	A	A	A	A	A	1R	A	SF	1R	A	A	A	0 / 3

- Note: The Australian Open was held twice in 1977, in January and December.

== Federation Cup ==
1981 Federation Cup
Date	Venue	Surface	Round	Opponents	Final match score	Match	Opponent	Rubber score
9–15 Nov 1981	Tokyo	Clay	1R	Belgium	3–0	Singles	Ann Gabriel	5–7, 6–3, 6–3 (W)
9–15 Nov 1981	Tokyo	Clay	1R	Belgium	3–0	Doubles (with Sue Barker)	de Witte/de Wouters	6–3, 6–3 (W)
9–15 Nov 1981	Tokyo	Clay	F	United States	0–3	Doubles (with Virginia Wade)	Casals/Jordan	4–6, 5–7 (L)
1982 Federation Cup
19–25 Nov 1982	Santa Clara	Hard	1R	Italy	2–1	Singles	Sabina Simmonds	6–4, 6–7, 1–6 (L)
19–25 Nov 1982	Santa Clara	Hard	1R	Italy	2–1	Doubles (with Anne Hobbs)	Murgo/Simmonds	6–4, 6–3 (W)
19–25 Nov 1982	Santa Clara	Hard	2R	Israel	3–0	Singles	Rafeket Binyamini	6–4, 6–2 (W)
19–25 Nov 1982	Santa Clara	Hard	QF	Czechoslovakia	1–2	Singles	Helena Suková	3–6, 2–6 (L)
19–25 Nov 1982	Santa Clara	Hard	QF	Czechoslovakia	1–2	Doubles (with Anne Hobbs)	Budarova/Suková	6–2, 4–6, 6–3 (W)
1983 Federation Cup
17–24 Jul 1983	Zürich	Clay	1R	Luxembourg	3–0	Singles	Simone Wolter	6–2, 6–0 (W)
17–24 Jul 1983	Zürich	Clay	1R	Luxembourg	3–0	Doubles (with Anne Hobbs)	Huberty/Wolter	6–0, 6–0 (W)
17–24 Jul 1983	Zürich	Clay	2R	Brazil	3–0	Singles	Patricia Medrado	6–4, 6–4 (W)
17–24 Jul 1983	Zürich	Clay	2R	Brazil	3–0	Doubles (with Anne Hobbs)	Medrado/Monteiro	6–3, 6–2 (W)
17–24 Jul 1983	Zürich	Clay	QF	West Germany	1–2	Singles	Bettina Bunge	3–6, 4–6 (L)
17–24 Jul 1983	Zürich	Clay	QF	West Germany	1–2	Doubles (with Anne Hobbs)	Bunge/Pfaff	3–6, 6–4, 10–8 (W)
1984 Federation Cup
15–22 Jul 1984	São Paulo	Clay	1R	Bulgaria	0–3	Singles	Manuela Maleeva	4–6, 6–4, 4–6 (L)
1984 Federation Cup Consolation Rounds
15–22 Jul 1984	São Paulo	Clay	1R	BYE				
15–22 Jul 1984	São Paulo	Clay	2R	Hungary	2–1	Doubles (with Amanda Brown)	Ritecz/Rozsavolgyi	6–2, 7–5 (W)
15–22 Jul 1984	São Paulo	Clay	QF	Canada	2–1	Doubles (with Amanda Brown)	Hetherington/Pelletier	7–6, 6–2 (W)
15–22 Jul 1984	São Paulo	Clay	SF	Brazil	1–2	Singles	Patricia Medrado	6–3, 6–1 (W)
1985 Federation Cup
6–14 Oct 1985	Nagoya	Hard	1R	West Germany	3–0	Singles	Petra Keppeler	6–4, 6–0 (W)
6–14 Oct 1985	Nagoya	Hard	1R	West Germany	3–0	Doubles (with Anne Hobbs)	Betzner/Keppeler	6–4, 3–6, 6–1 (W)
6–14 Oct 1985	Nagoya	Hard	2R	Japan	2–1	Doubles (with Anne Hobbs)	Inoue/Yanagi	6–7^{(2–7)}, 6–3, 6–2 (W)
6–14 Oct 1985	Nagoya	Hard	QF	Bulgaria	1–2	Singles	Katerina Maleeva	2–6, 6–4, 6–8 (L)
6–14 Oct 1985	Nagoya	Hard	QF	Bulgaria	1–2	Doubles (with Anne Hobbs)	K. Maleeva/Man. Maleeva	5–4, ret. (W)
1986 Federation Cup
20–27 Jul 1986	Prague	Clay	1R	Denmark	0–3	Singles	Tine Scheuer-Larsen	3–6, 1–6 (L)
20–27 Jul 1986	Prague	Clay	1R	Denmark	0–3	Doubles (with Anne Hobbs)	Moller/Scheuer-Larsen	2–6, 6–7^{(1–7)} (L)
1987 Federation Cup
26 Jul– 2 Aug 1987	Vancouver	N/A	1R	Chile	3–0	Singles	Macarena Miranda	6–2, 6–1 (W)
26 Jul– 2 Aug 1987	Vancouver	N/A	1R	Chile	3–0	Doubles (with Anne Hobbs)	Espinoza/Miranda	6–1, 6–0 (W)
26 Jul– 2 Aug 1987	Vancouver	N/A	2R	Italy	2–1	Singles	Raffaella Reggi	5–7, 4–6 (L)
26 Jul– 2 Aug 1987	Vancouver	N/A	2R	Italy	2–1	Doubles (with Anne Hobbs)	Cecchini/Reggi	6–7, 7–5, 6–4 (W)
26 Jul– 2 Aug 1987	Vancouver	N/A	QF	United States	0–3	Singles	Chris Evert	3–6, 1–6 (L)
26 Jul– 2 Aug 1987	Vancouver	N/A	QF	United States	0–3	Doubles (with Anne Hobbs)	Burgin/Garrison	5–7, 5–7 (L)
1989 Federation Cup
26 Jul– 2 Aug 1989	Tokyo	Hard	1R	Indonesia	3–0	Singles	Yayuk Basuki	6–2, 7–6^{(7–5)} (W)
26 Jul– 2 Aug 1989	Tokyo	Hard	1R	Indonesia	3–0	Doubles (with Anne Hobbs)	Anggarkusuma/Basuki	7–5, 6–3 (W)
26 Jul– 2 Aug 1989	Tokyo	Hard	2R	Austria	1–2	Singles	Barbara Paulus	6–2, 4–6, 3–6 (L)
26 Jul– 2 Aug 1989	Tokyo	Hard	2R	Austria	1–2	Doubles (with Anne Hobbs)	Paulus/Schwarz	3–6, 7–6^{(7–3)}, 6–3 (W)
1990 Federation Cup
21–29 Jul 1990	Atlanta	Hard	1R	Dominican Republic	3–0	Doubles (with Clare Wood)	Sánchez/Schad	6–2, 6–0 (W)
21–29 Jul 1990	Atlanta	Hard	2R	Italy	2–1	Doubles (with Clare Wood)	Golarsa/Reggi	6–4, 6–1 (W)
21–29 Jul 1990	Atlanta	Hard	QF	Austria	1–2	Singles	Barbara Paulus	6–7^{(3–7)}, 7–5, 4–6 (L)
21–29 Jul 1990	Atlanta	Hard	QF	Austria	1–2	Doubles (with Clare Wood)	Paulus/Reinstadler	5–2, ret. (W)
1991 Federation Cup
24 Jul 1991	Nottingham	N/A	1R	BYE				
24 Jul 1991	Nottingham	N/A	2R	Italy	0–2	Singles	Sandra Cecchini	5–7, 4–6 (L)
1992 Federation Cup World Group^{1}
13–17 Jul 1992	Frankfurt	Clay	1R	United States	0–3	Singles	Lori McNeil	5–7, 3–6 (L)
13–17 Jul 1992	Frankfurt	Clay	1R	United States	0–3	Doubles (with Clare Wood)	Graham/Shriver	4–6, 6–7^{(6–8)} (L)
13–17 Jul 1992	Frankfurt	Clay	PO; 1R	Chile	3–0	Singles	Paula Cabezas	6–7^{(5–7)}, 6–0, 6–1 (W)
13–17 Jul 1992	Frankfurt	Clay	PO (Final)	Finland	1–2	Singles	Petra Thorén	3–6, 5–7 (L)
>1993 Federation Cup World Group^{2}
20–22 Jul 1993	Frankfurt	Clay	1R	Spain	0–3	Singles	Conchita Martínez	2–6, 1–6 (L)
20–22 Jul 1993	Frankfurt	Clay	1R	Spain	0–3	Doubles (with Clare Wood)	Martínez/Sánchez Vicario	1–6, 6–4, 1–6 (L)
20–22 Jul 1993	Frankfurt	Clay	PO (Relegation)	Poland	1–2	Singles	Magdalena Feistel	6–2, 5–7, ret. (L)
1994 Federation Cup Europe/Africa Zone (Group I)
18–23 Apr 1994	Bad Waltersdorf	Clay	RR	Luxembourg	3–0	Singles	Rosabel Moyen	7–5, 6–0 (W)
18–23 Apr 1994	Bad Waltersdorf	Clay	RR	Luxembourg	3–0	Doubles (with Clare Wood)	Kremer/Moyen	6–4, 6–0 (W)
18–23 Apr 1994	Bad Waltersdorf	Clay	RR	Russia	2–1	Singles	Elena Makarova	4–6, 7–5, 7–5 (W)
18–23 Apr 1994	Bad Waltersdorf	Clay	PO; R1	Israel	3–0	Singles	Shiri Burstein	6–3, 6–2 (W)
18–23 Apr 1994	Bad Waltersdorf	Clay	PO; R1	Israel	3–0	Doubles (with Clare Wood)	Burstein/Obziler	6–1, 6–0 (W)
18–23 Apr 1994	Bad Waltersdorf	Clay	PO (Promotion)	Belgium	0–2	Singles	Dominique Monami	5–7, 3–6 (L)
1995 Federation Cup Europe/Africa Zone (Group I)
17–19 Apr 1995	Murcia	Clay	RR	Slovenia	1–2	Doubles (with Clare Wood)	Jezernik/Križan	2–6, 6–1, 6–2 (W)
17–19 Apr 1995	Murcia	Clay	RR	Czech Republic	0–3	Doubles (with Clare Wood)	Novotná/Suková	7–6^{(12–10)}, 1–6, 2–6 (L)
17–19 Apr 1995	Murcia	Clay	RR	Poland	2–1	Doubles (with Clare Wood)	Grzybowska/Olsza	6–2, 7–5 (W)

- 1 – In 1992 the 16 teams which lost in the first round of the main draw were re-drawn to face each other to maintain their positions in the World Group in 1993. The four teams which won their two knock-out play-off ties successfully defended their places in the World Group whilst the 12 teams which did not were relegated.
- 2 – In 1993 the 16 teams which lost in the first round of the main draw were re-drawn to face each other to maintain their positions in the World Group in 1994. The eight teams which won their knock-out play-off ties successfully defended their places in the World Group whilst the eight losing teams were relegated.
