= List of Mexico Davis Cup team representatives =

This is a list of tennis players who have represented the Mexico Davis Cup team in an official Davis Cup match. Mexico have taken part in the competition since 1924.

== Players ==
Player	W-L (Total)	W-L (Singles)	W-L (Doubles)	Ties	Debut
Enrique Abaroa	0–1	0–0	0–1	1	2001
Jorge Acosta	0–1	0–1	0–0	1	1931
Marcello Amador	0–3	0–3	0–0	2	2001
Juan Arredondo	0–1	0–1	0–0	1	1963
Luis Baraldi	3–4	2–3	1–1	5	1973
Claude Butlin	2–4	1–2	1–2	3	1925
Guillermo Carter	2–0	1–0	1–0	1	2003
Roberto Chávez	3–8	2–7	1–1	7	1975
Francisco Contreras	13–8	7–7	6–1	12	1953
Javier Contreras	0–1	0–1	0–0	1	1984
Ignacio de la Borbolla	0–9	0–7	0–2	4	1924
Luis Díaz Barriga	1–2	0–1	1–1	3	2010
Bruno Echagaray	9–12	4–5	5–7	14	2001
Juan Manuel Elizondo	2–0	2–0	0–0	2	2007
Oliver Fernández	3–5	3–4	0–1	4	1990
Luis-Manuel Flores	4–2	3–1	1–1	4	2003
Manuel Galeana	0–2	0–1	0–1	1	1952
Miguel Gallardo Valles	18–11	16–11	2–0	18	2001
Luis-Augusto García	4–2	2–1	2–1	4	1966
Daniel Garza	15–6	12–6	3–0	11	2006
Francisco Gerdes	0–2	0–1	0–1	1	1924
Alfonso González	2–0	1–0	1–0	1	1984
Adolfo González	1–0	0–0	1–0	1	1976
Santiago González	18–16	8–5	10–11	21	2001
Francisco Guerrero-Arcocha	1–5	1–3	0–2	5	1946
Enrique Haro	0–1	0–1	0–0	1	1979
Daniel Hernández	2–11	2–8	0–3	6	1935
Juan Hernández	0–1	0–1	0–0	1	1981
Alejandro Hernández	29–18	26–15	3–3	22	1994
Luis Herrera	13–17	10–16	3–1	15	1990
Robert Kinsey	2–5	0–4	2–1	3	1927
Daniel Langre	2–0	1–0	1–0	1	2004
Marcello Lara	23–13	15–11	8–2	18	1966
Leonardo Lavalle	30–27	21–17	9–10	25	1985
Mario Llamas	21–23	15–20	6–3	21	1951
Jose Llano	1–1	0–0	1–1	2	1935
Manuel Llano	0–5	0–2	0–3	4	1924
Joaquín Loyo-Mayo	22–23	17–19	5–4	21	1964
Jorge Lozano	20–23	8–11	12–12	25	1981
Mariano Lozano-Alatorre	0–1	0–1	0–0	1	1926
Francisco Maciel	13–12	13–11	0–1	14	1982
Flavio Martinez	0–1	0–0	0–1	1	1936
Octavio Martínez	0–1	0–1	0–0	1	1972
Eduardo Mestre	0–4	0–2	0–2	3	1932
Marco-Antonio Mestre	0–1	0–0	0–1	1	1936
Alfredo Millet	2–0	1–0	1–0	1	1950
Emilio Montaño	3–3	2–2	1–1	3	1977
Agustín Moreno	2–3	1–1	1–2	5	1985
Marco Aurélio Nunez	0–1	0–1	0–0	1	2011
Javier Ordaz	1–1	1–1	0–0	2	1980
Rafael Ortega	1–1	1–1	0–0	2	1950
Óscar Ortiz	5–6	0–3	5–3	10	1995
Marco Osorio	5–4	5–3	0–1	5	1998
Rafael Osuna	42–23	25–15	17–8	25	1958
Antonio Palafox	26–18	13–13	13–5	21	1956
Gustavo Palafox	10–10	6–6	4–4	9	1948
Carlos Palencia	2–1	2–1	0–0	2	2005
Fernando Pérez Pascal	7–6	2–4	5–2	7	1983
Anselmo Puente	1–0	1–0	0–0	1	1950
Raúl Ramírez	36–13	22–8	14–5	20	1971
César Ramírez	10–6	8–5	2–1	8	2008
Esteban "Pajarito" Reyes	3–7	3–7	0–0	6	1933
Esteban Reyes Jr.	1–3	1–3	0–0	4	1955
Miguel Ángel Reyes-Varela Sr.	1–1	1–1	0–0	2	1949
Miguel Ángel Reyes-Varela	2–1	0–0	2–1	3	2010
Luis Riefkohl	0–1	0–1	0–0	1	1949
David Roditi	5–5	0–0	5–5	10	1997
Bruno Rodríguez	5–1	3–1	2–0	5	2008
Ángel Roldán	0–1	0–1	0–0	1	1934
Víctor Romero	4–0	1–0	3–0	3	2004
Antonio Ruiz-Rosales	0–1	0–0	0–1	1	2007
Mariano Sánchez	4–2	4–1	0–1	3	1998
Manuel Sánchez	1–2	1–2	0–0	2	2011
Federico Sendel	0–1	0–1	0–0	1	1930
Eugenio Tapia	0–6	0–4	0–2	2	1938
Ricardo Tapia	0–18	0–15	0–3	8	1928
Alfonso Unda	2–12	0–6	2–6	11	1926
Armando Vega	9–13	6–8	3–5	8	1946
Rolando Vega	5–6	3–3	2–3	5	1946
Pedro Vega	0–1	0–1	0–0	1	1952
Vicente Zarazúa	14–9	2–6	12–3	16	1964
