= 1997 Fed Cup Americas Zone Group II – Pool A =

International tennis competition

Group A was one of two pools in the Americas Zone Group II of the 1997 Fed Cup. Seven teams competed in a round robin competition, with the top team advancing to Group I in 1998.

	(Paraguay) PAR	(Dominican Republic) DOM	(Trinidad and Tobago) TRI	(Panama) PAN	(Guatemala) GUA	(The Bahamas) BAH	(Barbados) BAR	Match; W–L	Set; W–L	Game; W–L	Standings
Paraguay		2–1	3–0	3–0	3–0	3–0	3–0	6–0	34–4	223–87	1
Dominican Republic	1–2		2–1	3–0	3–0	3–0	3–0	5–1	30–9	214–126	2
Trinidad and Tobago	0–3	1–2		3–0	3–0	3–0	2–1	4–2	27–12	207–125	3
Panama	0–3	0–3	0–3		2–1	2–1	3–0	3–3	14–25	153–196	4
Guatemala	0–3	0–3	0–3	1–2		2–1	2–1	2–4	12–27	120–194	5
Bahamas	0–3	0–3	0–3	1–2	1–2		2–1	1–5	11–29	123–215	6
Barbados	0–3	0–3	1–2	0–3	1–2	1–2		0–6	9–31	120–220	7

== Paraguay vs. Panama ==
Paraguay
3
Casa de Campo, Santo Domingo, Dominican Republic
12 May 1997
Har-Tru clay (outdoors)

Panama
0

			1	2	3
1	(Paraguay) (Panama)	Laura Bernal; Anabelle Espinosa Rodríguez	6; 1	6; 3
2	(Paraguay) (Panama)	Larissa Schaerer; Lorena Porras	6; 2	6; 1
3	(Paraguay) (Panama)	Laura Bernal / Ana Valeria Rolón; Anabelle Espinosa Rodríguez / Lorena Porras	6; 0	6; 4

== Trinidad and Tobago vs. Bahamas ==
Trinidad and Tobago
3
Casa de Campo, Santo Domingo, Dominican Republic
12 May 1997
Har-Tru clay (outdoors)

Bahamas
0

			1	2	3
1	(Trinidad and Tobago) (The Bahamas)	Anneliese Rose; Chris-Anne Aston	6; 0	6; 1
2	(Trinidad and Tobago) (The Bahamas)	Elizabeth Gibson; Kim Cartwright	6; 2	6; 1
3	(Trinidad and Tobago) (The Bahamas)	Elizabeth Gibson / Anneliese Rose; Chris-Anne Aston / Sharon Green	6; 1	6; 2

== Guatemala vs. Barbados ==
Guatemala
2
Casa de Campo, Santo Domingo, Dominican Republic
12 May 1997
Har-Tru clay (outdoors)

Barbados
1

			1	2	3
1	(Guatemala) (Barbados)	Luise-Elfride López; Kyla Hunte	6; 4	7; 5
2	(Guatemala) (Barbados)	Florea de María Urrea; Jennifer Carter	6; 1	6; 3
3	(Guatemala) (Barbados)	Luise-Elfride López / Florea de María Urrea; Tricia-Ann Greaves / Richele Le Saldo	4; 6	5; 7

== Paraguay vs. Barbados ==
Paraguay
3
Casa de Campo, Santo Domingo, Dominican Republic
13 May 1997
Har-Tru clay (outdoors)

Barbados
0

			1	2	3
1	(Paraguay) (Barbados)	Ana Valeria Rolón; Richele Le Saldo	6; 0	6; 1
2	(Paraguay) (Barbados)	Larissa Schaerer; Kyla Hunte	6; 2	6; 0
3	(Paraguay) (Barbados)	Laura Bernal / Ana Valeria Rolón; Tricia-Ann Greaves / Richele Le Saldo	6; 0	6; 1

== Dominican Republic vs. Panama ==
Dominican Republic
3
Casa de Campo, Santo Domingo, Dominican Republic
13 May 1997
Har-Tru clay (outdoors)

Panama
0

			1	2	3
1	(Dominican Republic) (Panama)	Madeleine Sánchez; Anabelle Espinosa Rodríguez	6; 3	6; 4
2	(Dominican Republic) (Panama)	Joelle Schad; Lorena Porras	7; 5	6; 1
3	(Dominican Republic) (Panama)	Glenny Cepeda / Mónika Pimentel; Anabelle Espinosa Rodríguez / Lorena Porras	6; 4	7; 5

== Guatemala vs. Bahamas ==
Guatemala
2
Casa de Campo, Santo Domingo, Dominican Republic
13 May 1997
Har-Tru clay (outdoors)

Bahamas
1

			1	2	3
1	(Guatemala) (The Bahamas)	Luise-Elfride López; Sharon Green	6; 1	6; 3
2	(Guatemala) (The Bahamas)	Florea de María Urrea; Kim Cartwright	5; 7	2; 6
3	(Guatemala) (The Bahamas)	Luise-Elfride López / Florea de María Urrea; Kim Cartwright / Sharon Green	3; 6	6; 0	6; 2

== Paraguay vs. Bahamas ==
Paraguay
3
Casa de Campo, Santo Domingo, Dominican Republic
14 May 1997
Har-Tru clay (outdoors)

Bahamas
0

			1	2	3
1	(Paraguay) (The Bahamas)	Laura Bernal; Sharon Green	6; 2	6; 1
2	(Paraguay) (The Bahamas)	Larissa Schaerer; Kim Cartwright	6; 0	6; 2
3	(Paraguay) (The Bahamas)	Laura Bernal / Ana Valeria Rolón; Chris-Anne Aston / Kim Cartwright	6; 1	7; 5

== Dominican Republic vs. Trinidad and Tobago ==
Dominican Republic
2
Casa de Campo, Santo Domingo, Dominican Republic
14 May 1997
Har-Tru clay (outdoors)

Trinidad and Tobago
1

			1	2	3
1	(Dominican Republic) (Trinidad and Tobago)	Madeleine Sánchez; Anneliese Rose	6; 3	4; 6	6; 1
2	(Dominican Republic) (Trinidad and Tobago)	Joelle Schad; Elizabeth Gibson	7^{7} 6^{4}	6; 4
3	(Dominican Republic) (Trinidad and Tobago)	Glenny Cepeda / Mónika Pimentel; Elizabeth Gibson / Anneliese Rose	3; 6	2; 6

== Panama vs. Barbados ==
Panama
3
Casa de Campo, Santo Domingo, Dominican Republic
14 May 1997
Har-Tru clay (outdoors)

Barbados
0

			1	2	3
1	(Panama) (Barbados)	Anabelle Espinosa Rodríguez; Kyla Hunte	6; 1	6; 3
2	(Panama) (Barbados)	Lorena Porras; Jennifer Carter	1; 6	6; 2	6; 4
3	(Panama) (Barbados)	Anabelle Espinosa Rodríguez / Lorena Porras; Tricia-Ann Greaves / Richele Le Saldo	6; 4	6; 4

== Dominican Republic vs. Barbados ==
Dominican Republic
3
Casa de Campo, Santo Domingo, Dominican Republic
15 May 1997
Har-Tru clay (outdoors)

Barbados
0

			1	2	3
1	(Dominican Republic) (Barbados)	Madeleine Sánchez; Kyla Hunte	6; 0	6; 3
2	(Dominican Republic) (Barbados)	Joelle Schad; Jennifer Carter	6; 1	6; 0
3	(Dominican Republic) (Barbados)	Glenny Cepeda / Mónika Pimentel; Tricia-Ann Greaves / Richele Le Saldo	3; 6	7; 5	6; 1

== Trinidad and Tobago vs. Guatemala ==
Trinidad and Tobago
3
Casa de Campo, Santo Domingo, Dominican Republic
15 May 1997
Har-Tru clay (outdoors)

Guatemala
0

			1	2	3
1	(Trinidad and Tobago) (Guatemala)	Anneliese Rose; Luise-Elfride López	6; 0	6; 2
2	(Trinidad and Tobago) (Guatemala)	Elizabeth Gibson; Florea de María Urrea	6; 1	6; 2
3	(Trinidad and Tobago) (Guatemala)	Elizabeth Gibson / Anneliese Rose; María Fernanda Carrillo / Luise-Elfride López	6; 1	6; 2

== Panama vs. Bahamas ==
Panama
2
Casa de Campo, Santo Domingo, Dominican Republic
15 May 1997
Har-Tru clay (outdoors)

Bahamas
1

			1	2	3
1	(Panama) (The Bahamas)	Anabelle Espinosa Rodríguez; Chris-Anne Aston	6; 2	6; 1
2	(Panama) (The Bahamas)	Lorena Porras; Kim Cartwright	6^{2} 7^{7}	2; 6
3	(Panama) (The Bahamas)	Anabelle Espinosa Rodríguez / Lorena Porras; Chris-Anne Aston / Kim Cartwright	4; 6	6; 2	6; 4

== Paraguay vs. Trinidad and Tobago ==
Paraguay
3
Casa de Campo, Santo Domingo, Dominican Republic
16 May 1997
Har-Tru clay (outdoors)

Trinidad and Tobago
0

			1	2	3
1	(Paraguay) (Trinidad and Tobago)	Laura Bernal; Anneliese Rose	6^{3} 7^{7}	6; 3	6; 3
2	(Paraguay) (Trinidad and Tobago)	Larissa Schaerer; Elizabeth Gibson	6; 3	6; 4
3	(Paraguay) (Trinidad and Tobago)	Ana Valeria Rolón / Larissa Schaerer; Elizabeth Gibson / Anneliese Rose	6; 4	3; 6	6; 3

== Dominican Republic vs. Guatemala ==
Dominican Republic
3
Casa de Campo, Santo Domingo, Dominican Republic
16 May 1997
Har-Tru clay (outdoors)

Guatemala
0

			1	2	3
1	(Dominican Republic) (Guatemala)	Madeleine Sánchez; Luise-Elfride López	6; 2	6; 1
2	(Dominican Republic) (Guatemala)	Joelle Schad; Florea de María Urrea	6; 0	6; 2
3	(Dominican Republic) (Guatemala)	Mónika Pimentel / Joelle Schad; María Fernanda Carrillo / Luise-Elfride López	6; 0	4; 6	6; 1

== Bahamas vs. Barbados ==
Bahamas
2
Casa de Campo, Santo Domingo, Dominican Republic
16 May 1997
Har-Tru clay (outdoors)

Barbados
1

			1	2	3
1	(The Bahamas) (Barbados)	Sharon Green; Kyla Hunte	2; 6	6; 2	2; 6
2	(The Bahamas) (Barbados)	Kim Cartwright; Jennifer Carter	6; 1	6; 3
3	(The Bahamas) (Barbados)	Chris-Anne Aston / Kim Cartwright; Jennifer Carter / Tricia-Ann Greaves	6^{8} 7^{10}	7^{7} 6^{1}	6; 4

== Paraguay vs. Guatemala ==
Paraguay
3
Casa de Campo, Santo Domingo, Dominican Republic
17 May 1997
Har-Tru clay (outdoors)

Guatemala
0

			1	2	3
1	(Paraguay) (Guatemala)	Ana Valeria Rolón; María Fernanda Carrillo	6; 2	6; 1
2	(Paraguay) (Guatemala)	Larissa Schaerer; Luise-Elfride López	6; 0	6; 0
3	(Paraguay) (Guatemala)	Laura Bernal / Larissa Schaerer; Luise-Elfride López / Florea de María Urrea	6; 0	6; 0

== Dominican Republic vs. Bahamas ==
Dominican Republic
3
Casa de Campo, Santo Domingo, Dominican Republic
17 May 1997
Har-Tru clay (outdoors)

Bahamas
0

			1	2	3
1	(Dominican Republic) (The Bahamas)	Madeleine Sánchez; Chris-Anne Aston	6; 2	6; 1
2	(Dominican Republic) (The Bahamas)	Joelle Schad; Kim Cartwright	6; 1	6; 1
3	(Dominican Republic) (The Bahamas)	Glenny Cepeda / Mónika Pimentel; Chris-Anne Aston / Sharon Green	6; 1	7; 5

== Trinidad and Tobago vs. Panama ==
Trinidad and Tobago
3
Casa de Campo, Santo Domingo, Dominican Republic
17 May 1997
Har-Tru clay (outdoors)

Panama
0

			1	2	3
1	(Trinidad and Tobago) (Panama)	Anneliese Rose; Anabelle Espinosa Rodríguez	7; 5	6; 0
2	(Trinidad and Tobago) (Panama)	Elizabeth Gibson; Lorena Porras	6; 1	6; 1
3	(Trinidad and Tobago) (Panama)	Elizabeth Gibson / Anneliese Rose; Anabelle Espinosa Rodríguez / Lorena Porras	7; 5	6; 4

== Paraguay vs. Dominican Republic ==
Paraguay
2
Casa de Campo, Santo Domingo, Dominican Republic
18 May 1997
Har-Tru clay (outdoors)

Dominican Republic
1

			1	2	3
1	(Paraguay) (Dominican Republic)	Laura Bernal; Madeleine Sánchez	6; 2	7^{7} 6^{4}
2	(Paraguay) (Dominican Republic)	Larissa Schaerer; Joelle Schad	6; 3	6; 1
3	(Paraguay) (Dominican Republic)	Laura Bernal / Ana Valeria Rolón; Madeleine Sánchez / Joelle Schad	3; 6	5; 7

== Trinidad and Tobago vs. Barbados ==
Trinidad and Tobago
3
Casa de Campo, Santo Domingo, Dominican Republic
18 May 1997
Har-Tru clay (outdoors)

Barbados
0

			1	2	3
1	(Trinidad and Tobago) (Barbados)	Natasha Kelly; Richele Le Saldo	4; 6	4; 6
2	(Trinidad and Tobago) (Barbados)	Anneliese Rose; Jennifer Carter	6; 2	6; 0
3	(Trinidad and Tobago) (Barbados)	Elizabeth Gibson / Anneliese Rose; Tricia-Ann Greaves / Richele Le Saldo	6; 1	6; 0

== Panama vs. Guatemala ==
Panama
2
Casa de Campo, Santo Domingo, Dominican Republic
18 May 1997
Har-Tru clay (outdoors)

Guatemala
1

			1	2	3
1	(Panama) (Guatemala)	Anabelle Espinosa Rodríguez; Luise-Elfride López	7; 5	2; 6	6; 4
2	(Panama) (Guatemala)	Lorena Porras; Florea de María Urrea	3; 6	1; 6
3	(Panama) (Guatemala)	Anabelle Espinosa Rodríguez / Lorena Porras; Luise-Elfride López / Florea de María Urrea	6; 1	6; 4

- Paraguay placed first in the pool, and thus advanced to Group I in 1998, where they placed second overall.

== See also ==
- Fed Cup structure
