= Mexico Billie Jean King Cup team =

Mexican national women's tennis team

Mexico
- Captain: Bruno Echagaray
- Nations Ranking: 36 ▲1 (16 November 2015)
- Colors: green & white
- First year: 1964
- Years played: 45
- Ties played (W–L): 152 (73–79)
- Years in World Group: 18 (4–18)
- Best finish: World Group 2R (1969, 1973, 1982, 1983, 1985)
- Most total wins: Angélica Gavaldón (21–11); Karin Palme (21–11)
- Most singles wins: Karin Palme (17–6)
- Most doubles wins: Daniela Múñoz Gallegos (9–3); Melissa Torres Sandoval (9–4); Angélica Gavaldón (9–4)
- Best doubles team: Melody Falcó / Paola Palencia (6–0); Ximena Hermoso / Daniela Muñoz Gallegos (6–0)
- Most ties played: Jessica Fernández (29)
- Most years played: Claudia Hernández (9)

The Mexico Billie Jean King Cup team represents Mexico in the Billie Jean King Cup tennis competition and are governed by the Federación Mexicana de Tenis. They currently compete in the Americas Zone Group II.

== History ==
Mexico competed in its first Fed Cup in 1964. Their best result was reaching the round of 16 on five occasions.

== Fisrt team (1964) ==
- Antonia Prado
- Patricia Reyes

== Current team (2026) ==
- Maria Fernanda Navarro (singles)
- Ana Sofía Sánchez (singles)
- Victoria Rodríguez (singles)
- Marian Gomez Pezuela Cano (doubles)

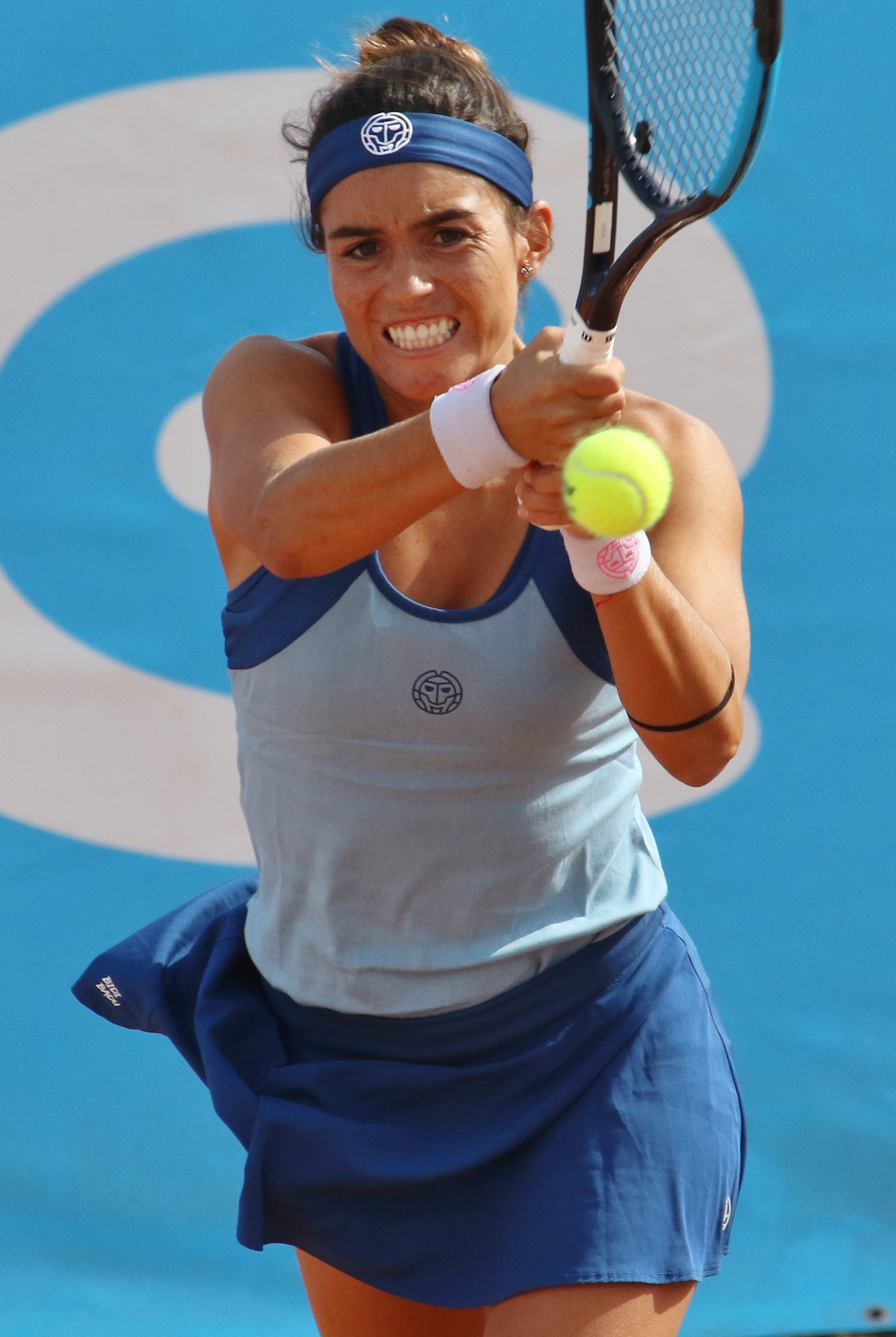
Ana Sofía Sánchez

== Results ==
Season	Zone	Results	Record
1991	WG Qualifying	Lost 2nd round	3-3
1992	Americas Zone G1	Advanced to WG	13-2
1992	World Group	Relegated	2-7
1993	Americas Zone G1	Lost 1st round	9-3
1994	Americas Zone G1	Lost Quarterfinal	8-7
1995	Americas Zone G1	Lost promotion	9-4
1996	Americas Zone G1	Round robin	3-6
1997	Americas Zone G1	Relegated	2-7
1998	Americas Zone G2	Promoted	21-0
1999	Americas Zone G1	Round robin	3-9
2000	Americas Zone G1	Round robin	7-5
2001	Americas Zone G1	Round robin	8-4
2002	Americas Zone G1	Lost promotion	5-6
2003	Americas Zone G1	Lost promotion	5-6
2004	Americas Zone G1	Lost promotion	9-2
2005	Americas Zone G1	Win Relegation	7-5
2006	Americas Zone G1	Round robin	6-6
2007	Americas Zone G1	Round robin	3-5
2008	Americas Zone G1	Lost relegation	0-9
2009	Americas Zone G2	Round robin	6-3
2010	Americas Zone G2	Win promotion	12-3
2011	Americas Zone G1	Lost relegation	2-12
2012	Americas Zone G2	Win promotion	10-4
2013	Americas Zone G1	Win relegation	5-6
2014	Americas Zone G1	Win relegation	3-6
2015	Americas Zone G1	Round robin	6-3
2016	Americas Zone G1	4th place	6-5
2017	Americas Zone G1	Lost relegation	4-10
2018	Americas Zone G2	Win promotion	8-0
2019	Americas Zone G1	4th place	7-5
2020-21	Americas Zone G1	Lost promotion	10-6
2022	Americas Zone G1	Advanced to WG	8-3
2022	Play-Offs	TBD	

== Players ==
Last Updated: 22 August 2019

Player	W–L (Total)	W–L (Singles)	W–L (Doubles)	Ties	Debut
Laila Abdalá	1 – 3	-	1 – 3	4	2011
Nadia Abdalá	1 – 3	-	1 – 3	4	2011
Laura-Alicia Aguilar	1 – 0	-	1 – 0	1	2009
Lorena Arias	0 – 2	-	0 – 2	2	2008
Marcela Arroyo	5 – 3	3 – 2	2 – 1	7	2004
Alina Balbiers	3 – 4	1 – 3	2 – 1	4	1976
Alina Baraldi	0 – 2	0 – 1	0 – 1	1	1978
Lucila Becerra	11 – 11	5 – 3	6 – 8	15	1987
Carolina Betancourt	2 – 1	0 – 1	2 – 0	3	2012
Erika Clarke	5 – 7	0 – 3	5 – 4	10	2005
Fernanda Contreras	3 – 0	2 – 0	1 – 0	3	2018
Ana Paula de la Peña	4 – 3	-	4 – 3	9	2012
Gina Díaz-Ponce	1 – 2	1 – 1	0 – 1	2	1973
Xóchitl Escobedo	9 – 9	7 – 3	2 – 6	12	1987
Melody Falcó	11 – 3	4 – 1	7 – 2	11	1998
Jessica Fernández	20 – 17	16 – 11	4 – 6	29	1995
Aránzazu Gallardo	2 – 5	0 – 2	2 – 3	6	1989
Zarina Galvan	1 – 1	-	1 – 1	2	1986
Angélica Gavaldón	21 – 11	12 – 7	9 – 4	19	1990
Lucia Gongora	0 – 1	-	0 – 1	1	1969
Alejandra Granillo	6 – 2	4 – 2	2 – 0	7	2009
Ximena Hermoso	15 – 7	7 – 5	8 – 2	19	2009
Claudia Hernández	15 – 21	10 – 12	5 – 9	22	1982
Maluca Llamas	3 – 7	1 – 4	2 – 3	8	1979
Lourdes López	5 – 2	3 – 1	2 – 1	4	2001
María José López Herrera	0 – 2	0 – 1	0 – 1	2	2001
Veronica Martínez	0 – 1	-	0 – 1	1	1976
Patricia Montaño	0 – 3	0 – 2	0 – 1	2	1968
Daniela Morales Beckmann	1 – 0	-	1 – 0	1	2018
Claudia Muciño	2 – 3	-	2 – 3	5	1994
Monica Muñoz	0 – 3	0 – 2	0 – 1	2	1986
Daniela Múñoz Gallegos	14 – 14	5 – 11	9 – 3	24	2003
Lupita Novelo	11 – 9	3 – 4	8 – 5	14	1990
Giuliana Olmos	8 – 8	4 – 4	4 – 4	12	2010
Paola Palencia	7 – 2	1 – 0	6 – 2	9	1996
Karin Palme	21 – 11	17 – 6	4 – 5	26	1994
Isabela Petrov	6 – 3	5 – 1	1 – 2	9	1991
María José Portillo Ramírez	3 – 1	1 – 1	2 – 0	4	2018
Antonia Prado	0 – 2	0 – 1	0 – 1	1	1964
Valeria Pulido	0 – 4	0 – 3	0 – 1	3	2008
Yola Ramírez	3 – 5	2 – 3	1 – 2	5	1972
Patricia Reyes	0 – 2	0 – 1	0 – 1	1	1964
Liza Riefkohl	0 – 2	-	0 – 2	2	1981
Victoria Rodríguez	5 – 7	1 – 3	4 – 4	11	2014
Susana Rojas	1 – 0	-	1 – 0	1	1977
Maria-Teresa Salvidea-Diaz	1 – 0	-	1 – 0	1	1973
Ana Sofía Sánchez	10 – 10	9 – 10	1 – 0	19	2012
Heliane Steden	5 – 11	4 – 8	1 – 3	12	1981
Elena Subirats	9 – 7	7 – 2	2 – 5	9	1968
Melissa Torres Sandoval	18 – 13	9 – 9	9 – 4	24	1999
Nazari Urbina	0 – 4	0 – 4	-	4	2011
Erika Valdés	4 – 3	1 – 3	3 – 0	7	1999
Alejandra Vallejo	6 – 15	0 – 8	6 – 7	16	1976
Graciela Vélez	10 – 10	3 – 3	7 – 7	14	1994
Lorena Villalobos-Cruz	1 – 1	-	1 – 1	2	2006
Marcela Zacarías	16 – 7	14 – 2	2 – 5	19	2012
Renata Zarazúa	11 – 10	4 – 6	7 – 4	14	2015

== See also ==
- Billie Jean King Cup
- Mexico Davis Cup team
