= Octavio Martínez =

Mexican tennis player

- Country (sports): Mexico
- Born: Mexico City, Mexico

Singles
- Career record: 0–5
- Highest ranking: No. 310 (12 Dec 1976)

Doubles
- Career record: 0–2
- Highest ranking: No. 610 (3 Jan 1983)

Octavio Martínez is a Mexican former professional tennis player.

Known by the nickname "Tavo", Martínez was born in Mexico City and was a national junior champion in 1970. He played collegiate tennis for the University of Miami, where he earned All-American honors as a senior in 1976. While competing on the international tour he was ranked as high as 310 in the world and represented the Mexico Davis Cup team in a 1972 tie against the United States in Mexico City, losing in the reverse singles to Harold Solomon.

During the 1980s, while Tavo was attending a tennis tournament at the Britannia Club in León, Guanajuato, he met his future wife, Rocío Aranda Moreno. After a brief relationship, they got married in Rocío's hometown of León, Guanajuato. The reception took place at the then newly remodeled Club Campestre de León, where Tavo subsequently served as the tennis pro for many years. Together, they have two daughters, Rocío and María José Martínez Aranda.

== See also ==
- List of Mexico Davis Cup team representatives
