= Alfonso Unda =

Mexican tennis player

- Country (sports): Mexico

Singles

Grand Slam singles results
- US Open: 1R (1928)
Medal record
Central American and Caribbean Games
Gold medal – first place	1926 Mexico City	Men's singles
Gold medal – first place	1926 Mexico City	Men's doubles
Gold medal – first place	1930 Havana	Men's doubles
Gold medal – first place	1935 San Salvador	Men's doubles
Gold medal – first place	1935 San Salvador	Mixed doubles

Alfonso Unda was a Mexican tennis player.

A five-time gold medalist for Mexico at the Central American and Caribbean Games, Unda's tally includes a singles gold at the 1926 Mexico City games, beating Mariano Lozano in the final.

Unda competed for the Mexico Davis Cup team from 1926 to 1937, for a total of 11 ties. He won two rubbers during his career, both in doubles against Cuba. Many of his ties were against the United States and it was rare in this era for Mexico to even win a set against the Americans, which Unda managed to do in two 1928 rubbers, against Bill Tilden/Arthur Jones in doubles and Wilmer Allison in singles.

== See also ==
- List of Mexico Davis Cup team representatives
