= Melody Falcó =

Mexican tennis player

- Full name: Melody Falcó Díaz
- Country (sports): Mexico
- Born: 18 July 1975 (age 49); Mexico City, Mexico
- Prize money: $15,558

Singles
- Career record: 51–47
- Highest ranking: No. 340 (15 May 2000)

Doubles
- Career record: 51–41
- Career titles: 7 ITF
- Highest ranking: No. 255 (29 May 2000)
Medal record
Central American and Caribbean Games
Silver medal – second place	1998 Maracaibo	Women's doubles
Silver medal – second place	1998 Maracaibo	Women's team

Melody Falcó Díaz (born 18 July 1975) is a Mexican former professional tennis player.

Falcó, who won seven ITF doubles titles, represented Mexico at the 1998 Central American and Caribbean Games in Maracaibo, where she earned two silver medals. She played collegiate tennis for the University of Texas.

Between 1998 and 2000 she was a member of the Mexico Fed Cup team. In her debut year she featured primarily in doubles, winning all six of her matches partnering Paola Palencia. She didn't play for Mexico in 1999, then in 2000 returned to the side and appeared in the first singles rubber in each of her four ties, which included a win over Colombia's Catalina Castaño. Her doubles partners in 2000 were Jessica Fernández and Erika Valdés.

== ITF finals ==
$25,000 tournaments
$10,000 tournaments

=== Doubles: 9 (7–2) ===
Result	No.	Date	Tournament	Surface	Partner	Opponents	Score
Win	1.	26 June 1995	Mexico City, Mexico	Hard	(Dominican Republic) Joelle Schad	(Turkey) Gülberk Gültekin (United States) Mindy Weiner	6–3, 6–3
Loss	1.	16 November 1998	Los Mochis, Mexico	Hard	(Mexico) Paola Palencia	(Hungary) Zsófia Gubacsi (Switzerland) Aliénor Tricerri	1–6, 2–6
Win	2.	26 April 1999	Coatzacoalcos, Mexico	Hard	(Dominican Republic) Joelle Schad	(United States) Adria Engel (Slovakia) Alena Paulenková	4–1 ret.
Win	3.	10 May 1999	Tampico, Mexico	Hard	(Dominican Republic) Joelle Schad	(Brazil) Joana Cortez (Brazil) Carla Tiene	6–3, 4–6, 6–4
Win	4.	17 May 1999	Ciudad Juárez, Mexico	Hard	(Dominican Republic) Joelle Schad	(Australia) Kylie Hunt (Australia) Nicole Sewell	3–6, 6–1, 6–3
Loss	2.	12 September 1999	Mexico City, Mexico	Clay	(Dominican Republic) Joelle Schad	(Brazil) Joana Cortez (Brazil) Vanessa Menga	4–6, 2–6
Win	5.	27 September 1999	Montevideo, Uruguay	Clay	(Dominican Republic) Joelle Schad	(Argentina) Jorgelina Cravero (Argentina) María Emilia Salerni	6–3, 6–4
Win	6.	14 May 2000	Tampico, Mexico	Hard	(Brazil) Carla Tiene	(United Kingdom) Helen Crook (United Kingdom) Victoria Davies	6–4, 6–3
Win	7.	21 May 2000	Poza Rica, Mexico	Hard	(Brazil) Carla Tiene	(Ecuador) Candice de la Torre (Australia) Nadia Johnston	4–6, 6–2, 6–3
