= Anselmo Puente =

Mexican tennis player

- Country (sports): Mexico

Singles

Grand Slam singles results
- US Open: 1R (1952)
Medal record
Pan American Games
Bronze medal – third place	1951 Buenos Aires	Men's doubles
Central American and Caribbean Games
Gold medal – first place	1946 Barranquilla	Men's singles
Gold medal – first place	1954 Mexico City	Men's doubles
Silver medal – second place	1954 Mexico City	Mixed doubles
Bronze medal – third place	1946 Barranquilla	Men's doubles

Anselmo Puente is a Mexican former tennis player.

Puente, the men's singles champion at the 1946 Central American and Caribbean Games, made one Davis Cup appearance for Mexico, an America Zone semi-final against Cuba in Havana in 1950. He played in the opening singles rubber, which he won over Juan Weiss in five sets.

At the 1951 Pan American Games in Buenos Aires, Puente teamed up with Gustavo Palafox to win a bronze medal in the men's doubles. He also represented Mexico at the 1955 Pan American Games.

In 1952 he was one of a record seven Mexicans to enter into the main draw of the U.S. National Championships. He fell in the first round to local player William Cranston, in what would be his only grand slam main draw appearance.

== See also ==
- List of Mexico Davis Cup team representatives
