= Karim Strohmeier =

Peruvian tennis player (born 1969)

- Full name: Karim Strohmeier-Merino
- Country (sports): Peru
- Born: 1 November 1969 (age 55)
- Plays: Right-handed
- Prize money: $19,976

Singles
- Career record: 46–50
- Career titles: 2 ITF

Grand Slam singles results
- US Open: Q1 (1989)

Doubles
- Career record: 32–42
- Career titles: 0

Karim Strohmeier-Merino (born 1 November 1969) is a Peruvian former professional tennis player.

A right-handed player, Strohmeier featured in three Federation Cup ties for Peru in 1987, against Brazil, Malta and Norway. She won two ITF singles titles during her career and featured in the qualifying draw for the 1989 US Open.

== ITF Circuit finals ==
=== Singles: 2 (2–0) ===
Result	No.	Date	Tournament	Surface	Opponent	Score
Win	1.	28 September 1987	Santiago, Chile	Clay	(Switzerland) Michèle Strebel	6–4, 6–1
Win	2.	24 July 1988	León, Mexico	Hard	(Mexico) Lucila Becerra	6–4, 6–2

=== Doubles: 3 (1–2) ===
Result	No.	Date	Tournament	Surface	Partner	Opponents	Score
Loss	1.	24 July 1988	León, Mexico	Hard	(United States) Jamie Pisarcik	(United States) Karen Buchholz (Denmark) Lone Vandborg	3–6, 6–3, 6–7
Loss	2.	31 July 1988	Mexico City, Mexico	Hard	(United States) Jamie Pisarcik	(Mexico) Lucila Becerra (Mexico) Xóchitl Escobedo	4–6, 6–2, 4–6
Win	1.	14 October 1990	Lima, Peru	Clay	(Peru) Laura Arraya	(Cuba) Iluminada Concepción (Cuba) Rita Pichardo	6–4, 7–6
