= Adria Engel =

American tennis player

- Full name: Adria Engel Raines
- Country (sports): United States
- Born: December 21, 1979 (age 45); Chicago, Illinois, U.S.
- Height: 5 ft 6 in (168 cm)
- Prize money: $35,575

Singles
- Career record: 119–101
- Career titles: 2 ITF
- Highest ranking: No. 296 (October 12, 1998)

Doubles
- Career record: 64–67
- Career titles: 3 ITF
- Highest ranking: No. 218 (October 12, 1998)

Adria Engel Raines (born December 21, 1979) is an American former professional tennis player.

Born in Chicago, Engel is of Czech heritage through both of her parents, who were noted sportspeople in their native Czechoslovakia. Her mother played tennis and trained with Věra Suková, while her father was a professional soccer player. She also has an elder brother, Marty, who played some professional tennis.

Engel was a member of the Arizona State Sun Devils (ASU) varsity tennis team and amassed an ASU record 132 career-singles wins. In 2001, as a sophomore, she became the first player from ASU to claim a Pac-10 singles title.

== ITF finals ==
$25,000 tournaments
$10,000 tournaments

=== Singles: 6 (2–4) ===
Outcome	No.	Date	Tournament	Surface	Opponent	Score
Runner-up	1.	March 26, 1995	ITF Monterrey, Mexico	Hard	(United States) Sylvia Schenck	5–7, 7–5, 1–6
Winner	1.	August 17, 1997	ITF Margarita Island, Venezuela	Hard	(United States) Miriam D'Agostini	7–6^{(4)}, 6–4
Runner-up	2.	May 24, 1998	ITF Coatzacoalcos, Mexico	Hard	(Russia) Alina Jidkova	3–6, 1–6
Runner-up	3.	June 25, 2000	ITF Easton, United States	Hard	(United States) Jacqueline Trail	6–4, 2–6, 1–6
Winner	2.	July 2, 2000	ITF Springfield, United States	Hard	(South Korea) Chang Kyung-mi	6–2, 6–3
Runner-up	4.	June 24, 2001	ITF Montreal, Canada	Hard	(Japan) Kaori Aoyama	1–6, 7–5, 3–6

=== Doubles: 9 (3–6) ===
Outcome	No.	Date	Tournament	Surface	Partner	Opponents	Score
Winner	1.	October 22, 1995	ITF Joué-lès-Tours, France	Hard	(Germany) Eva Belbl	(France) Cécile De Winne (France) Celine Regnier	6–7^{(5)}, 6–2, 6–2
Winner	2.	May 10, 1998	ITF Tampico, Mexico	Hard	(Russia) Alina Jidkova	(Chile) Paula Cabezas (Brazil) Vanessa Menga	7–6, 7–5
Runner-up	1.	May 17, 1998	ITF Poza Rica, Mexico	Hard	(Russia) Alina Jidkova	(Chile) Paula Cabezas (Brazil) Vanessa Menga	6–3, 2–6, 2–6
Runner-up	2.	May 24, 1998	ITF Coatzacoalcos, Mexico	Hard	(Russia) Alina Jidkova	(Chile) Paula Cabezas (Brazil) Vanessa Menga	3–6, 2–6
Runner-up	3.	June 21, 1998	ITF Mount Pleasant, United States	Hard	(Mexico) Karin Palme	(United States) Keri Phebus (Canada) Vanessa Webb	2–6, 1–6
Runner-up	4.	May 2, 1999	ITF Coatzacoalcos, Mexico	Hard	(Slovakia) Alena Paulenková	(Mexico) Melody Falcó (Dominican Republic) Joelle Schad	1–4 ret.
Winner	3.	July 1, 2001	ITF Lachine, Canada	Hard	(Switzerland) Aliénor Tricerri	(Japan) Ayano Takeuchi (Japan) Tomoko Yonemura	6–2, 6–1
Runner-up	5.	June 30, 2002	ITF Lachine, Canada	Hard	(United States) Kristina Kraszewski	(Japan) Seiko Okamoto (Japan) Shizu Katsumi	w/o
Runner-up	6.	June 15, 2003	ITF Allentown, United States	Hard	(United States) Kelly McCain	(New Zealand) Ilke Gers (South Africa) Surina De Beer	7–6^{(4)}, 3–6, 3–6
