= Esteban Reyes =

Mexican tennis player (1913–2014)

Esteban Reyes Canizal
- Country (sports): Mexico
- Born: 22 July 1913; Contepec, Michoacán
- Died: 19 March 2014 (aged 100); Mexico City
- Retired: 1941

Coaching career (1941–2008)
- Rafael Osuna, Gustavo Palafox, Antonio Palafox, Carmelita Christlieb, Mela Ramírez, Hilde Heyn, Marcelo Lara, Vicente Zarazúa, Joaquín Loyo Mayo, Rolando Vega, Armando Vega, Mario Llamas, Francisco Guerrero Arcocha, José María Zubirán and Alina Balbiers

Esteban Reyes (22 July 1913 – 19 March 2014) also known as El Pajarito Reyes was a Mexican tennis player who represented his country during the 1935 International Lawn Tennis Challenge (nowadays known as the Davis Cup) and won a silver medal during the 1935 Central American and Caribbean Games.

== See also ==
- List of Mexico Davis Cup team representatives
