= Esteban Reyes Jr. =

Mexican tennis player (born 1937)

- Full name: Esteban Reyes Delgado
- Country (sports): Mexico
- Born: 6 April 1937 (age 89)

Grand Slam singles results
- Australian Open: 1R (1956)
- French Open: 2R (1957)
- Wimbledon: 2R (1957)
Medal record
Central American and Caribbean Games
Silver medal – second place	1954 Mexico City	Men's doubles

Esteban Reyes Delgado (born 6 April 1937) is a Mexican former tennis player.

Reyes was the only son of tennis player turned coach Esteban Reyes Sr. His sisters, Patricia and Rosie, were also tennis players and represented Mexico at the Federation Cup. Excelling in junior tennis, Reyes was the 1952 Orange Bowl (15s) champion. In 1955 he won the US national junior championships and debuted for the Mexico Davis Cup team. He played Davis Cup until 1960, with his final appearance a default win over American Chuck McKinley.

== See also ==
- List of Mexico Davis Cup team representatives
