= Francisco Galván =

Mexican tennis player

- Country (sports): Mexico

Singles

Grand Slam singles results
- US Open: 2R (1948)
Medal record
Central American and Caribbean Games
Bronze medal – third place	1946 Barranquilla	Men's doubles
Bronze medal – third place	1946 Barranquilla	Mixed doubles

Francisco Galván is a Mexican former tennis player.

Galván won two bronze medals for Mexico in doubles at the 1946 Central American and Caribbean Games.

In 1948 he featured in the main draw of the U.S. National Championships, where he was beaten in the second round by Herbert Flam, following a first round bye.
