= Tennis at the 2023 Central American and Caribbean Games =

- Venue: Polideportivo Ciudad Merliot
- Location: (El Salvador) Ciudad Merliot
- Dates: 1–7 July

The tennis competition at the 2023 Central American and Caribbean Games will be held in Ciudad Merliot, El Salvador from 1 to 7 July at the Polideportivo Ciudad Merliot.

== Medal table ==
* Host nation (El Salvador)

Rank	Nation	Gold	Silver	Bronze	Total
1	Colombia (COL)	3	3	0	6
2	Dominican Republic (DOM)	3	1	1	5
3	Venezuela (VEN)	1	0	1	2
4	Mexico (MEX)	0	2	1	3
5	Costa Rica (CRC)	0	1	0	1
6	Centro Caribe Sports (CCS)	0	0	2	2
7	Honduras (HON)	0	0	1	1
7	Jamaica (JAM)	0	0	1	1
Totals (8 entries)		7	7	7	21

== Medal summary ==
=== Men's events ===
Event	Gold	Silver	Bronze
Singles	Nick Hardt (DOM)	Roberto Cid (DOM)	Blaise Bicknell (JAM)
Doubles	Venezuela (VEN); Brandon Perez; Ricardo Rodriguez-Pace	Costa Rica (CRC); Rodrigo Crespo; Jesse Flores	Dominican Republic (DOM); Roberto Cid; Nick Hardt
Nations Cup	Dominican Republic (DOM); Nick Hardt; Roberto Cid; Peter Bertran	Colombia (COL); Alejandro Hoyos; Johan Rodríguez; Nicolás Buitrago; Cristian Rodríguez	Venezuela (VEN); Ricardo Rodriguez-Pace; Brandon Perez; Rafael Abdul

=== Women's events ===
Event	Gold	Silver	Bronze
Singles	María Herazo González (COL)	Yuliana Lizarazo (COL)	Maria Navarro (MEX)
Doubles	Colombia (COL); Yuliana Lizarazo; María Paulina Pérez	Mexico (MEX); Jessica Hinojosa; Maria Navarro	Centro Caribe Sports (CCS); Maria Morales; Kirsten-Andrea Weedon
Nations Cup	Colombia (COL); María Herazo González; Yuliana Lizarazo; Yuliana Monroy; María Paulina Pérez	Mexico (MEX); Maria Navarro; Jessica Hinojosa; Maria Martinez	Honduras (HON); Siham Richmagui; Daniela Obando; Natalie Espinal; Alejandra Obando

=== Mixed event ===
Event	Gold	Silver	Bronze
Doubles	Dominican Republic (DOM); Peter Bertran; Kelly Williford	Colombia (COL); Cristian Rodríguez; María Paulina Pérez	Centro Caribe Sports (CCS); Sebastian Dominguez; Kirsten-Andrea Weedon

== Men's singles ==
=== Seeds ===
1. (Dominican Republic) Nick Hardt (champion; gold medalist)
2. (Dominican Republic) Roberto Cid Subervi (final; silver medalist)
3. (Jamaica) Blaise Bicknell (semifinals; bronze medalist)
4. (Colombia) Johan Rodríguez (quarterfinals)
5. (Mexico) Alan Rubio (semifinals; fourth place)
6. (Colombia) Nicolás Buitrago (first round)
7. (Costa Rica) Jesse Flores (first round)
8. (Venezuela) Ricardo Rodríguez-Pace (quarterfinals)

=== Draw ===
==== Finals ====
Semifinals
1	(Dominican Republic) Nick Hardt	6	6
5	(Mexico) Alan Rubio	1	3
3	(Jamaica) Blaise Bicknell	2	1
2	(Dominican Republic) Roberto Cid Subervi	6	6

Gold medal match
1	(Dominican Republic) Nick Hardt	6	3	[10]
2	(Dominican Republic) Roberto Cid Subervi	2	6	[7]
Bronze medal match
5	(Mexico) Alan Rubio	1	7^{7}	[8]
3	(Jamaica) Blaise Bicknell	6	6^{3}	[10]

==== Top half ====
First round
(United States Virgin Islands) T del Olmo	6	3	[8]
(Curaçao) L Deelstra	3	6	[10]
(Barbados) X Lawrence	6	7^{7}
(Cuba) D Zuñiga	3	6^{2}
(Venezuela) R Abdul	7	7
7	(Costa Rica) J Flores	5	5
4	(Colombia) J Rodríguez	7^{7}	6
(Puerto Rico) G Evans	6^{2}	3
(Grenada) M Alexander	0	0
(Honduras) A Obando	6	6
(Jamaica) J Chin	2	2
(El Salvador) C Cruz	6	6
K Hernández	6	0	[6]
5	(Mexico) A Rubio	2	6	[10]

Second round
1	(Dominican Republic) N Hardt	6	6
(Curaçao) L Deelstra	0	0
(Barbados) X Lawrence	3	1
(Venezuela) R Abdul	6	6
4	(Colombia) J Rodríguez	6	6
(Honduras) A Obando	2	2
(El Salvador) C Cruz	6	5	[7]
5	(Mexico) A Rubio	4	7	[10]

Quarterfinals
1	(Dominican Republic) N Hardt	6	6
(Venezuela) R Abdul	3	2
4	(Colombia) J Rodríguez	6^{5}	3
5	(Mexico) A Rubio	7^{7}	6

Semifinals
1	(Dominican Republic) N Hardt	6	6
5	(Mexico) A Rubio	1	3

==== Bottom half ====
First round
6	(Colombia) N Buitrago	6^{4}	1
(Mexico) L Álvarez	7^{7}	6
(Costa Rica) R Crespo	6	6
(Curaçao) A Gomez	1	2
(Barbados) K Marshall	4	7	[7]
(Puerto Rico) M Mesarovic	6	5	[10]
(Cuba) R Galindo	0	1
3	(Jamaica) B Bicknell	6	6
8	(Venezuela) R Rodríguez-Pace	6	6
(El Salvador) D Duran	3	3
K Hernández	3	6	[8]
(Panama) J Gómez	6	2	[10]
(Honduras) G Bennaton	6	6
(United States Virgin Islands) I Beharry	1	4

Second round
(Mexico) L Álvarez	4	0
(Costa Rica) R Crespo	6	6
(Puerto Rico) M Mesarovic	3	1
3	(Jamaica) B Bicknell	6	6
8	(Venezuela) R Rodríguez-Pace	6	6
(Panama) J Gómez	0	0
(Honduras) G Bennaton	0	0
2	(Dominican Republic) R Cid Subervi	6	6

Quarterfinals
(Costa Rica) R Crespo	3	7^{7}	[10]
3	(Jamaica) B Bicknell	6	6^{4}	[12]
8	(Venezuela) R Rodríguez-Pace	2	3
2	(Dominican Republic) R Cid Subervi	6	6

Semifinals
3	(Jamaica) B Bicknell	2	1
2	(Dominican Republic) R Cid Subervi	6	6
