= Rafael Ortega (tennis) =

Mexican tennis player

- Country (sports): Mexico

Singles

Grand Slam singles results
- US Open: 1R (1952, 1953)
Medal record
Central American and Caribbean Games
Silver medal – second place	1954 Mexico City	Men's singles

Rafael Ortega is a Mexican former tennis player who was active in the 1950s.

Ortega appeared in two Davis Cup ties for Mexico during his career, against Cuba away in Havana in 1950, then Japan at home in Mexico City in 1954.

In both 1952 and 1953, Ortega competed in the main draw of the U.S. National Championships, for two first-round losses. His first-round match against William Quillian in 1953 went to five sets.

At the 1954 Central American and Caribbean Games in Mexico City he won a silver medal in the singles event, behind countryman Mario Llamas.

== See also ==
- List of Mexico Davis Cup team representatives
