= Marilda Julia =

Puerto Rican tennis player (born 1965)

- Full name: Marilda Julia Sanchez
- Country (sports): Puerto Rico
- Residence: South Carolina, U.S.
- Born: February 22, 1965 (age 61) San Juan, Puerto Rico

Singles
- Highest ranking: No. 492 (Dec 21, 1986)

Doubles
- Highest ranking: No. 451 (Jan 19, 1987)
Medal record
Central American and Caribbean Games
Gold medal – first place	1982 Havana	Women's doubles
Silver medal – second place	1986 Santiago	Women's singles
Bronze medal – third place	1986 Santiago	Women's doubles
Bronze medal – third place	1986 Santiago	Women's team
Pan American Games
Silver medal – second place	1983 Caracas	Women's doubles
Bronze medal – third place	1987 Indianapolis	Women's doubles
Universiade
Bronze medal – third place	1985 Kobe	Women's singles

Marilda Julia Sanchez (born February 22, 1965) is a Puerto Rican former professional tennis player.

Julia, who comes from San Juan originally, combined her tennis career with studies at the University of Puerto Rico at Mayagüez and made two WTA Tour main draw appearances, at the Puerto Rico Open in 1986 and 1987.

Throughout the 1980s she represented Puerto Rico in many multi-sport events. She partnered with Gigi Fernández to win the doubles gold medal at the 1982 Central American and Caribbean Games and four years later in Santiago de los Caballeros was runner-up to Crissy González in the singles. She won two Pan American Games medals for Puerto Rico in doubles and was a singles bronze medalist at the 1985 Summer Universiade in Kobe.

A member of the Puerto Rican Sports Pavilion of Fame, Julia now lives in South Carolina and is the head tennis professional at the Rawls Creek Tennis and Swim Club.
