= Juan Arredondo =

Mexican tennis player

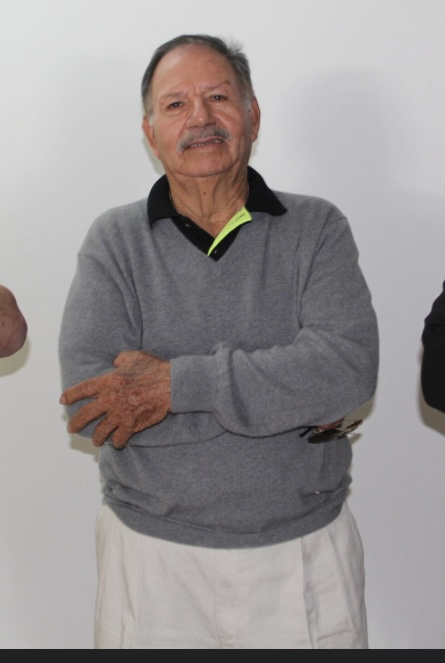
- Full name: Juan (Juanolas) Arredondo Chavez
- Country (sports): Mexico
- Born: 10 November 1934; San Luis Potosí, San Luis Potosí
- Died: 13 December 2022 (aged 88); Hermosillo, Sonora
Medal record
Pan American Games
Silver medal – second place	1963 São Paulo	Men's doubles
Central American and Caribbean Games
Gold medal – first place	1962 Kingston	Men's doubles
Silver medal – second place	1962 Kingston	Mixed doubles
Silver medal – second place	1962 Kingston	Men's singles

Juan Arredondo Chavez (10 November 1934 – 13 December 2022) was a Mexican tennis player.

Arredondo partnered with Vicente Zarazúa in doubles to win a gold medal at the 1962 Central American and Caribbean Games and a silver medal at the 1963 Pan American Games.

In Vancouver in 1963, Arredondo made his only Davis Cup appearance for Mexico, for a tie against Canada. He played in the reverse singles, a dead rubber which he lost to Keith Carpenter in five sets.

His son, Juan Carlos, competed on the professional tour and was a 2001 Universiade doubles champion.

== See also ==
- List of Mexico Davis Cup team representatives
