= Manuel Llano (tennis) =

Mexican tennis player

- Full name: Manuel Llano Ríos
- Country (sports): Mexico
- Born: 1897 Texcoco, Mexico
- Died: 18 November 1931 Mexico City

Grand Slam singles results
- US Open: 2R (1924)
Medal record
Central American and Caribbean Games
Silver medal – second place	1926 Mexico City	Men's doubles
Bronze medal – third place	1930 Havana	Men's doubles

Manuel Llano Ríos (died 18 November 1931) was a Mexican tennis player.

A two-time medalist at the Central American and Caribbean Games, Llano was an occasional Davis Cup player for Mexico. During his Davis Cup career he featured in a total of five rubbers across four ties between 1924 and 1931. He competed in the main draw of the U.S. National Championships while touring in the 1920s.

Llano died on 18 November 1931, of injuries sustained days earlier when he shot himself in the chest with a rifle. At the time of his suicide he was the second highest ranked Mexican player on tour. It was reported that he had been suffering from an illness that he feared would prevent him from being able to play tennis.

== See also ==
- List of Mexico Davis Cup team representatives
