= Olga Montaño =

Mexican tennis player

- Country (sports): Mexico

Singles

Grand Slam singles results
- French Open: 1R (1967)
Medal record
Central American and Caribbean Games
Gold medal – first place	1966 San Juan	Women's doubles
Bronze medal – third place	1966 San Juan	Women's singles

Olga Montaño is a Mexican former professional tennis player.

Montaño, who was given the name of her mother, is the eldest of three tennis playing siblings. Her brother Emilio was a Davis Cup player for Mexico and her sister Patricia was a national Federation Cup representative.

Partnering her sister, Montaño won the women's doubles gold medal at the 1966 Central American and Caribbean Games and was also a bronze medalist in the singles event.

In 1967 she featured in the main draw of the French Championships and fell in the first round to Maryna Godwin.
