= Iluminada Concepción =

Cuban tennis player

- Full name: Iluminada Iraida Concepción Chappotín
- Country (sports): Cuba
- Born: 29 November 1956 (age 68)

Singles
- Career record: 28–24
- Career titles: 2 ITF
- Highest ranking: No. 391 (17 Jul7 1989)

Doubles
- Career record: 27–26
- Career titles: 3 ITF
- Highest ranking: No. 288 (17 Jul7 1989)

Iluminada Concepción (born 29 November 1956) is a Cuban former professional tennis player.

== Career ==
Concepción was a doubles bronze medalist at the 1975 Pan American Games. She represented the Cuba Federation Cup team in two doubles rubbers, against Romania in 1991 and the Dominican Republic in 1992.

== ITF finals ==
=== Singles: 2 (2–0) ===
Result	No.	Date	Tournament	Surface	Opponent	Score
Win	1.	9 October 1988	Lima, Peru	Clay	(Brazil) Stephanie Mayorkis	6–3, 6–0
Win	2.	26 February 1990	León, Mexico	Clay	(Cuba) Belkis Rodríguez	5–7, 6–3, 6–0

=== Doubles: 4 (3–1) ===
Result	No.	Date	Tournament	Surface	Partner	Opponents	Score
Win	1.	9 October 1988	Lima, Peru	Clay	(Republic of Ireland) Lesley O'Halloran	(Peru) Carla Rodríguez (Peru) Lorena Rodríguez	6–3, 6–2
Win	2.	22 May 1989	Mexico City, Mexico	Hard	(Cuba) Belkis Rodríguez	(Mexico) Blanca Borbolla (United States) Sylvia Schenck	7–5, 4–1 ret.
Win	3.	19 August 1990	Pesaro, Italy	Hard	(Cuba) Rita Pichardo	(United States) Diana Chavez (United States) Jolene Watanabe	7–6, 6–2
Loss	1.	14 October 1990	Lima, Peru	Clay	(Cuba) Rita Pichardo	(Peru) Laura Arraya (Peru) Karim Strohmeier	4–6, 6–7
