= Francisco Guerrero-Arcocha =

Mexican tennis player

Francisco Guerrero
- Full name: Francisco Guerrero-Arcocha
- Country (sports): Mexico
- Born: 26 April 1919; Madrid, Spain

Singles

Grand Slam singles results
- US Open: 2R (1945, 1952)
Medal record
Central American and Caribbean Games
Gold medal – first place	1950 Guatemala City	Men's doubles
Silver medal – second place	1954 Mexico City	Men's doubles
Bronze medal – third place	1954 Mexico City	Men's singles

Francisco Guerrero Arcocha (born 26 April 1919) was a Mexican tennis player.

Born in Madrid, Spain, he moved with his family to Leon, Guanajuato, Mexico when he was six months old. He grew up as a Mexican citizen and was one of the best tennis players in Mexican history.

He was a national singles and doubles champion in Mexico. He played tennis at a professional level representing Mexico in many tournaments in different countries, such as France, Spain, Canada and Portugal.

Guerrero Arcocha represented Mexico in five Davis Cup ties between 1946 and 1955. He was a men's doubles gold medalist at the 1950 Central American and Caribbean Games (with Gustavo Palafox) and won a further two medals when Mexico hosted the event in 1954, including a bronze in the singles. In 1955 he played at the Pan American Games and lost a bronze medal play-off in the men's doubles.

Guerrero Arcocha twice featured in the main draw of the U.S. National Championships. He competed at the 1945 U.S. National Championships as the 10th seed and was eliminated in the second round, after receiving a first round bye. His other appearance came in 1952 and he won a five-set first round match over William Lurie. In his second round loss to Ham Richardson he was unable to win a single game.

Post retirement he served as President of the Mexico Tennis Federation, during which time tennis made a return to the Summer Olympics as an exhibition and demonstration event for Mexico City in 1968.

== See also ==
- List of Mexico Davis Cup team representatives
