= Macarena Miranda =

Chilean tennis player (born 1971)

- Country (sports): Chile
- Born: 29 July 1971 (age 55)
- Prize money: $26,219

Singles
- Career titles: 1 ITF
- Highest ranking: No. 325 (12 November 1990)

Doubles
- Career titles: 4 ITF
- Highest ranking: No 187 (30 January 1989)

Macarena Miranda (born 29 July 1971) is a Chilean former professional tennis player.

Miranda competed on the professional tour from 1986 to 1992, achieving career-high rankings of No. 325 in singles and No. 187 in doubles. During her career, she was a regular member of the Chile Federation Cup team. Her best performance on the WTA Tour was a semifinal appearance in the doubles at Guaruja in 1988. After retiring in 1992, she made a comeback in 2002, playing an additional five Fed Cup ties for Chile, bringing her final tally to 14.

== ITF finals ==
=== Singles: 6 (1–5) ===
Result	No.	Date	Tournament	Surface	Opponent	Score
Loss	1.	21 September 1987	ITF Lima, Peru	Clay	(Brazil) Andrea Vieira	3–6, 5–7
Loss	2.	8 October 1990	ITF Lima, Peru	Clay	(Argentina) Inés Gorrochategui	4–6, 3–6
Loss	3.	22 October 1990	ITF Santiago, Chile	Clay	(Argentina) Inés Gorrochategui	2–6, 2–6
Win	1.	19 August 1991	ITF Manaus, Brazil	Hard	(Brazil) Sumara Passos	3–6, 6–3, 6–1
Loss	4.	2 September 1991	ITF São Paulo, Brazil	Clay	(Brazil) Andrea Vieira	3–6, 6–4, 3–6
Loss	5.	16 September 1991	ITF Bogotá, Colombia	Clay	(Argentina) María Luciana Reynares	4–6, 4–6

=== Doubles: 11 (4–7) ===
Result	No.	Date	Tournament	Surface	Partner	Opponents	Score
Loss	1.	7 September 1987	ITF Bogotá, Colombia	Clay	(Chile) Carolina Espinoza	(Brazil) Luciana Tella (Brazil) Andrea Vieira	5–7, 5–7
Loss	2.	14 September 1987	Medellín, Colombia	Clay	(Argentina) Andrea Tiezzi	(Brazil) Luciana Tella (Brazil) Andrea Vieira	6–4, 5–7, 3–6
Loss	3.	21 September 1987	Lima, Peru	Clay	(Argentina) Andrea Tiezzi	(Brazil) Luciana Tella (Brazil) Andrea Vieira	6–7, 3–6
Loss	4.	28 September 1987	Santiago, Chile	Clay	(Argentina) Andrea Tiezzi	(Switzerland) Michèle Strebel (Uruguay) Patricia Miller	4–6, 2–6
Loss	5.	3 July 1989	Puerto Vallarta, Mexico	Hard	(United States) Leslie Hakala	(United States) Alysia May (United States) Kimberly Po	2–6, 1–6
Loss	6.	9 September 1991	Guayaquil, Ecuador	Clay	(Ecuador) María Dolores Campana	(Chile) Paula Cabezas (Ecuador) Nuria Niemes	1–6, 5–7
Win	1.	16 September 1991	Bogotá, Colombia	Clay	(Chile) Paula Cabezas	(Peru) Carla Rodriguez (Peru) Lorena Rodriguez	6–4, 6–2
Win	2.	4 November 1991	Florianópolis, Brazil	Clay	(Chile) Paula Cabezas	(Cuba) Rita Pichardo (Cuba) Belkis Rodríguez	3–6, 6–2, 6–2
Loss	7.	11 November 1991	Rio de Janeiro, Brazil	Clay	(Chile) Paula Cabezas	(Cuba) Rita Pichardo (Cuba) Belkis Rodríguez	2–6, 3–6
Win	3.	7 September 1992	Kingston, Jamaica	Hard	(Hungary) Virág Csurgó	(Peru) Gianfranca Devercelli (United States) Tracy Schroeder	6–4, 6–2
Win	4.	14 September 1992	ITF Santo Domingo, Dominican Republic	Clay	(Hungary) Virág Csurgó	(Peru) Gianfranca Devercelli (United States) Tracy Schroeder	6–4, 4–6, 6–1
