= Juan Ríos (tennis) =

Puerto Rican tennis player

- Full name: Juan Oscar Ríos
- Country (sports): Puerto Rico
- Born: December 15, 1966 (age 58); Río Piedras, Puerto Rico
- Height: 6 ft 1 in (185 cm)
- Prize money: $16,302

Singles
- Highest ranking: No. 261 (1991.10.14)

Doubles
- Highest ranking: No. 277 (1987.11.23)

Juan Oscar Ríos (born December 15, 1966) is a former tennis player from Puerto Rico.

He represented his native country as a qualifier at the 1992 Summer Olympics in Barcelona, where he was defeated in the first round by Italy's Omar Camporese. The right-hander reached his highest singles ATP-ranking on October 14, 1991, when he became the 261st best in the world.
