= Rita Pichardo =

Cuban professional tennis player

- Full name: Rita Maria Pichardo
- Country (sports): Cuba
- Born: May 22, 1970 (age 54)
- Prize money: $13,063

Singles
- Career record: 40–31
- Career titles: 2 ITF
- Highest ranking: No. 403 (23 March 1992)

Doubles
- Career record: 52–25
- Career titles: 6 ITF
- Highest ranking: No. 209 (2 December 1991)

Rita Maria Pichardo (born 22 May 1970) is a Cuban former professional tennis player.

Pichardo, a five-time national champion, represented the Cuba Federation Cup team in 1991 and 1992. She featured in a total of six ties, including a World Group second round matchup against Romania, where she lost her singles rubber in three sets to Irina Spîrlea.

In 1993, while competing in satellite tournaments in Mexico, Pichardo made the decision to defect to the United States and with the help of friends crossed the border at Tijuana on a fake passport.

== ITF finals ==
=== Singles: 4 (2–2) ===
Result	No.	Date	Tournament	Surface	Opponent	Score
Win	1.	19 May 1991	San Luis Potosí, Mexico	Hard	(Canada) Monica Mraz	3–6, 6–4, 6–0
Loss	1.	26 May 1991	Aguascalientes, Mexico	Hard	(United States) Kirsten Dreyer	6–7^{(4)}, 3–6
Win	2.	9 March 1992	Monterrey, Mexico	Hard	(Cuba) Belkis Rodríguez	6–3, 2–6, 6–3
Loss	2.	3 October 1993	Monterrey, Mexico	Clay	(Mexico) Lucila Becerra	3–6, 5–7

=== Doubles: 9 (6–3) ===
Result	No.	Date	Tournament	Surface	Partner	Opponents	Score
Win	1.	4 March 1990	León, Mexico	Clay	(Cuba) Yoannis Montesino	(Mexico) Hortensia Hernandez (Mexico) Alicia Meraz	6–0, 6–4
Win	2.	19 August 1990	Pesaro, Italy	Hard	(Cuba) Iluminada Concepción	(United States) Diana Chavez (United States) Jolene Watanabe	7–6, 6–2
Loss	1.	14 October 1990	Lima, Peru	Clay	(Cuba) Iluminada Concepción	(Peru) Laura Arraya (Peru) Karim Strohmeier	4–6, 6–7
Win	3.	22 April 1991	Villahermosa, Mexico	Hard	(Cuba) Belkis Rodríguez	(Mexico) Olga Limon (Mexico) Isabela Petrov	6–4, 5–7, 7–6^{(5)}
Win	4.	13 May 1991	San Luis Potosí, Mexico	Hard	(Cuba) Belkis Rodríguez	(Mexico) Xóchitl Escobedo (Mexico) Isabela Petrov	6–4, 1–6, 6–3
Loss	2.	4 November 1991	Florianópolis, Brazil	Clay	(Cuba) Belkis Rodríguez	(Chile) Paula Cabezas (Chile) Macarena Miranda	6–3, 2–6, 2–6
Win	5.	11 November 1991	Rio de Janeiro, Brazil	Clay	(Cuba) Belkis Rodríguez	(Chile) Paula Cabezas (Chile) Macarena Miranda	6–2, 6–3
Loss	3.	9 March 1992	Monterrey, Mexico	Hard	(Cuba) Belkis Rodríguez	(Mexico) Lucila Becerra (United States) Vincenza Procacci	4–6, 4–6
Win	6.	20 September 1993	Guadalajara, Mexico	Clay	(Cuba) Belkis Rodríguez	(Colombia) Adriana Garcia (Cuba) Yoannis Montesino	6–3, 6–1
