= Belkis Rodríguez =

Cuban tennis player

- Country (sports): Cuba
- Born: 14 May 1965 (age 60)
- Turned pro: 1988
- Retired: 1996
- Prize money: $18,920

Singles
- Career record: 64 - 56
- Career titles: 2 ITF
- Highest ranking: 407 (29 October 1990)

Doubles
- Career record: 79 - 49
- Career titles: 7 ITF
- Highest ranking: 209 (2 December 1991)

Team competitions
- Fed Cup: 22–13

Belkis Rodríguez (born 14 May 1965) is a Cuban retired female tennis player.

Playing for Cuba at the Fed Cup, Rodríguez had a win–loss record of 22–13.

== ITF finals ==
=== Singles (2-2) ===
Result	No.	Date	Tournament	Surface	Opponent	Score
Loss	1.	February 26, 1990	León, Mexico	Clay	(Cuba) Iluminada Concepción	7–5, 3–6, 0–6
Win	2.	May 6, 1991	Mexico City, Mexico	Hard	(Dominican Republic) Joelle Schad	6–2, 4–6, 6–3
Loss	3.	March 9, 1992	Monterrey, Mexico	Hard	(Cuba) Rita Pichardo	3–6, 6–2, 3–6
Win	4.	November 16, 1992	San Salvador, El Salvador	Hard	(Colombia) Cecilia Hincapié	6–4, 6–4

=== Doubles (7-7) ===
Result	No.	Date	Tournament	Surface	Partner	Opponents	Score
Loss	1.	October 26, 1987	Rio de Janeiro, Brazil	Clay	(Brazil) Lucia Peria	(Brazil) Niege Dias (Brazil) Gisele Faria	3–6, 2–6
Win	2.	May 22, 1989	Mexico City, Mexico	Hard	(Cuba) Iluminada Concepción	(Mexico) Blanca Borbolla (United States) Sylvia Schenck	7–5, 4–1 ret.
Loss	3.	May 14, 1990	Guadalajara, Mexico	Clay	(Mexico) Blanca Borbolla	(Venezuela) María Vento-Kabchi (United States) Rita Winebarger	6–0, 5–7, 4–6
Loss	4.	May 21, 1990	Aguascalientes, Mexico	Hard	(Canada) Suzanne Italiano	(Philippines) Jean Lozano (Mexico) Lupita Novelo	1–6, 1–6
Win	5.	April 22, 1991	Villahermosa, Mexico	Hard	(Cuba) Rita Pichardo	(Mexico) Olga Limon (Mexico) Isabela Petrov	6–4, 5–7, 7–6^{(5)}
Win	6.	May 13, 1991	San Luis Potosí, Mexico	Hard	(Cuba) Rita Pichardo	(Mexico) Xóchitl Escobedo (Mexico) Isabela Petrov	6–4, 1–6, 6–3
Loss	7.	November 4, 1991	Florianópolis, Brazil	Clay	(Cuba) Rita Pichardo	(Chile) Paula Cabezas (Chile) Macarena Miranda	6–3, 2–6, 2–6
Win	8.	November 11, 1991	Rio de Janeiro, Brazil	Clay	(Cuba) Rita Pichardo	(Chile) Paula Cabezas (Chile) Macarena Miranda	6–2, 6–3
Loss	9.	March 9, 1992	Monterrey, Mexico	Hard	(Cuba) Rita Pichardo	(Mexico) Lucila Becerra (United States) Vincenza Procacci	4–6, 4–6
Win	10.	November 16, 1992	San Salvador, El Salvador	Hard	(Cuba) Yoannis Montesino	(Colombia) Adriana Garcia (Colombia) Cecilia Hincapié	6–2, 6–2
Win	11.	September 6, 1993	Caracas, Venezuela	Clay	(Cuba) Yoannis Montesino	(Ecuador) María Dolores Campana (Venezuela) Eleonora Vegliante	6–0, 6–1
Win	12.	September 20, 1993	Guadalajara, Mexico	Clay	(Cuba) Rita Pichardo	(Colombia) Adriana Garcia (Cuba) Yoannis Montesino	6–3, 6–1
Loss	13.	September 19, 1994	Guadalajara, Mexico	Clay	(Cuba) Yoannis Montesino	(Mexico) Lucila Becerra (Mexico) Xóchitl Escobedo	3–6, 3–6
Loss	14.	April 1, 1996	Tampico, Mexico	Clay	(Cuba) Yoannis Montesino	(Mexico) Claudia Muciño (Dominican Republic) Joelle Schad	2–6, 3–6
