= Antonia Prado =

Mexican tennis player

- Country (sports): Mexico
Medal record
Central American and Caribbean Games
| Gold medal – first place | 1962 Kingston | Women's singles |
| Gold medal – first place | 1962 Kingston | Women's doubles |
| Silver medal – second place | 1962 Kingston | Mixed doubles |

Antonia Prado is a Mexican former tennis player active in the 1960s.

Prado, the women's singles champion at the 1962 Central American and Caribbean Games, represented Mexico at the 1963 Pan American Games in São Paulo. She fell in the quarter-finals to Maria Bueno, but made it as far as the bronze medal play-off in the women's doubles event.

In 1964 she made her only appearance with the Mexico Federation Cup team, for a World Group 1st round tie against Czechoslovakia in Philadelphia. She lost her singles match to Jitka Horčičková and was also beaten in the doubles, while partnering Patricia Reyes.
