= Erika Valdés =

Mexican tennis player

- Full name: Erika Leticia Valdés Samaniego
- Country (sports): Mexico
- Born: 20 July 1983 (age 41); Mexico City, Mexico
- Height: 5 ft 10 in (178 cm)
- Plays: Right-handed
- Prize money: $16,572

Singles
- Career titles: 2 ITF
- Highest ranking: No. 402 (8 October 2001)

Doubles
- Career titles: 1 ITF
- Highest ranking: No. 374 (27 August 2001)

Erika Leticia Valdés Samaniego (born 20 July 1983) is a Mexican former professional tennis player.

== Biography ==
A right-handed player from Mexico City, Valdés represented the Mexico Fed Cup team from 1999 to 2002, playing in a total of seven ties.

As a professional player she reached a career best singles ranking of 402 and won two ITF titles. She twice featured as a wildcard in the main draw of the Mexican Open WTA Tour tournament, in 2001 and 2002. On both occasions she was eliminated in the first round, which included a loss to defending champion Amanda Coetzer in the 2002 edition.

In 2003 she ended her professional career to play college tennis in the United States at Tulane University. She won a bronze medal for Mexico in the women's doubles at the 2003 Summer Universiade.

Valdés was a member of the Mexican squad for the 2003 Pan American Games in Santo Domingo but didn't participate in the tournament. She had travelled to Santo Domingo and an injury replacement for Jessica Fernández, however due to Mexico's authorities failing to notify the event organisers of this change in time, she was unable to take her place in the draw.

== ITF circuit finals ==
=== Singles: 3 (1–2) ===
| Outcome | Date | Tournament | Surface | Opponent | Score |
|---|---|---|---|---|---|
| Winner | 27 August 2000 | Toluca, Mexico | Clay | (Russia) Olga Kalyuzhnaya | 6–4, 4–6, 7–6 |
| Winner | 19 August 2001 | San Luis Potosí, Mexico | Hard (O) | (United States) Andrea Nathan | 7–6^{(5)}, 0–6, 6–4 |

=== Doubles: 3 (0–3) ===
| Outcome | Date | Tournament | Surface | Partner | Opponents | Score |
|---|---|---|---|---|---|---|
| Runner-up | 14 August 2000 | Cuernavaca, Mexico | Clay | (Mexico) Melissa Torres Sandoval | (United States) Stephanie Mabry (Australia) Michelle Summerside | 2–6, 3–6 |
| Runner-up | 21 August 2000 | Toluca, Mexico | Clay | (Mexico) Melissa Torres Sandoval | (United States) Kristy Blumberg (United States) Anne Plessinger | W/O |
| Winner | 19 August 2001 | San Luis Potosí, Mexico | Hard (O) | (United States) Andrea Nathan | (Mexico) Alejandra Guerra (United States) Laila Shetty | 6–0, 6–4 |
