= Javier Ordaz =

Mexican tennis player (born 1955)

- Country (sports): Mexico
- Born: 4 April 1955 (age 70)
- Plays: Right-handed
- Prize money: $2,281

Singles
- Career record: 1–3 (at ATP Tour level, Grand Slam level, and in Davis Cup)
- Career titles: 0
- Highest ranking: No. 390 (22 December 1980)

Doubles
- Career record: 1–2 (at ATP Tour level, Grand Slam level, and in Davis Cup)
- Career titles: 1 Challenger
- Highest ranking: No. 317 (3 April 1989)
- Last updated on: 25 June 2018.

Javier Ordaz (born 4 April 1955) is a Mexican former tennis player.

Ordaz has a career high ATP singles ranking of 390 achieved on 22 December 1980. He also has a career high ATP doubles ranking of 317 achieved on 3 April 1989.

Ordaz has 1 ATP Challenger Tour title at the 1989 San Luis Open Challenger Tour.
