= Gina Díaz-Ponce =

Mexican tennis player

- Country (sports): Mexico
- Born: 28 September 1955
- Died: 2016 (aged 60)

Singles

Grand Slam singles results
- French Open: Q1 (1973)
- Wimbledon: Q1 (1973)
Medal record
Central American and Caribbean Games
Gold medal – first place	1974 Santo Domingo	Women's singles
Gold medal – first place	1974 Santo Domingo	Women's doubles

Gina Díaz-Ponce (28 September 1955 – 2016) was a Mexican professional tennis player.

Díaz-Ponce, a native of Yucatán, was a Federation Cup player for Mexico in 1973, featuring in ties against Austria and Great Britain. She was a singles and doubles gold medalist at the 1974 Central American and Caribbean Games.
