= Madeleine Sánchez =

Dominican Republic tennis player

- Full name: Madeleine Sánchez-Petel
- Country (sports): Dominican Republic
- Born: 10 May 1968 (age 56)

Singles
- Career record: 13–13
- Career titles: 1 ITF
- Highest ranking: No. 548 (9 Jul 1990)

Doubles
- Career record: 8–8
- Career titles: 1 ITF
- Highest ranking: No. 475 (6 Aug 1990)
Medal record
Central American and Caribbean Games
Silver medal – second place	1986 Santiago	Mixed doubles
Silver medal – second place	1986 Santiago	Women's team
Silver medal – second place	1990 Mexico City	Women's team
Bronze medal – third place	1986 Santiago	Women's singles
Bronze medal – third place	1990 Mexico City	Women's doubles

Madeleine Sánchez-Petel (born 10 May 1968) is a Dominican Republic former professional tennis player.

Sánchez was a singles bronze medalist at the 1986 Central American and Caribbean Games (CACGs) and also represented the Dominican Republic at the 1987 Pan American Games in Indianapolis, where she participated in both the singles and doubles draws. She has won a further four medals at the CACGs, including a mixed doubles silver in 1986 (with Rafael Moreno) and a women's doubles bronze partnering Joelle Schad at the 1990 edition in Mexico City.

Educated in the United States, Sánchez had a stop-start career for the Dominican Republic Fed Cup team. She debuted in 1990 and featured in three ties, then didn't appear again until 1997. In 2001, following a three-year absence, she played in the Fed Cup for the final time. From her 12 Fed Cup ties she won seven singles and two doubles rubbers.

Sánchez, who played collegiate tennis for Tulane University, featured in the occasional professional satellite tournament and was ranked as high as 548 in the world in singles. In 1994 she won both the singles and doubles titles of an ITF tournament in Marseille.

In 2005 she took over as the Dominican Republic's new Fed Cup captain.

== ITF finals ==
=== Singles: 1 (1–0) ===
Outcome	No.	Date	Tournament	Surface	Opponent	Score
Winner	1.	25 September 1994	Marseille, France	Clay	(France) Axelle Thomas	6–4, 7–5

=== Doubles: 1 (1–0) ===
Outcome	No.	Date	Tournament	Surface	Partner	Opponents	Score
Winner	1.	25 September 1994	Marseille, France	Clay	(France) Catherine Tanvier	(Spain) Marta Cano (Spain) Cristina De Subijana	6–3, 6–2
