= Paola Palencia =

Mexican tennis player

- Country (sports): Mexico
- Born: 16 March 1979 (age 46); Córdoba, Mexico
- Height: 5 ft 7 in (170 cm)

Singles
- Career record: 14–11
- Highest ranking: No. 636 (10 May 1999)

Doubles
- Career record: 7–8
- Highest ranking: No. 525 (15 March 1999)
Medal record
Central American and Caribbean Games
| Silver medal – second place | 1998 Maracaibo | Women's doubles |
| Silver medal – second place | 1998 Maracaibo | Women's team |

Paola Palencia (born 16 March 1979) is a Mexican former professional tennis player.

Born in Córdoba, Palencia featured in a total of nine Fed Cup ties for Mexico, between 1996 and 1998. She played mostly as a doubles player and was unbeaten in the six rubbers where she partnered with Melody Falcó. Her only singles rubber was a win over Costa Rica's Melissa Golfin.

Palencia won two silver medals for Mexico at the 1998 Central American and Caribbean Games in Maracaibo.

Between 1999 and 2002 she played collegiate tennis for Pepperdine University, where she twice earned All-American honors for doubles (partnering İpek Şenoğlu).

== ITF finals ==
=== Doubles: 1 (0–1) ===
| Result | No. | Date | Tournament | Surface | Partner | Opponents | Score |
|---|---|---|---|---|---|---|---|
| Loss | 1. | 16 November 1998 | Los Mochis, Mexico | Hard | (Mexico) Melody Falcó | (Hungary) Zsófia Gubacsi (Switzerland) Aliénor Tricerri | 1–6, 2–6 |
