= Mariano Lozano =

Mexican tennis player (1894–1968)

Personal information
- Born: 18 April 1894; Tacubaya, Mexico
- Died: 11 December 1968 (aged 74); Mexico City, Mexico

Sport
- Sport: Tennis

Mariano Lozano (18 April 1894 – 11 December 1968) was a Mexican tennis player. He competed in the men's singles and doubles events at the 1924 Summer Olympics.
