= Joelle Schad =

Dominican tennis player

- Country (sports): Dominican Republic
- Born: 13 March 1973 (age 52) Santo Domingo, Dominican Republic
- Prize money: $31,049

Singles
- Career record: 73–37
- Career titles: 0 WTA, 4 ITF
- Highest ranking: 219 (21 October 1996)

Other tournaments
- Olympic Games: 1R (1996)

Doubles
- Career record: 67–27
- Career titles: 0 WTA, 10 ITF
- Highest ranking: 166 (17 March 1997)
Medal record
Representing Dominican Republic
Pan American Games
| Silver medal – second place | 1991 Havana | women's singles |
| Bronze medal – third place | 1991 Havana | Mixed doubles |

Joelle Schad (born 13 March 1973) is a former Dominican tennis player.

Playing for Dominican Republic at the Fed Cup, she has accumulated a win–loss record of 38–21.

== ITF Circuit finals ==
=== Singles: 10 (4–6) ===
$100,000 tournaments
$75,000 tournaments
$50,000 tournaments
$25,000 tournaments
$10,000 tournaments

| Result | No. | Date | Tournament | Surface | Opponent | Score |
|---|---|---|---|---|---|---|
| Loss | 1. | 6 May 1991 | Mexico City, Mexico | Hard | (Cuba) Belkis Rodríguez | 2–6, 6–4, 3–6 |
| Win | 2. | 7 November 1994 | Santo Domingo, Dominican Republic | Clay | (Chile) Paula Cabezas | 6–3, 6–2 |
| Loss | 3. | 12 June 1995 | Morelia, Mexico | Hard | (United States) Meghann Shaughnessy | 4–6, 6–1, 6–7 |
| Loss | 4. | 26 June 1995 | Mexico City, Mexico | Hard | (Canada) Renata Kolbovic | 6–4, 6–7, 6–7 |
| Loss | 5. | 17 July 1995 | Santos, Brazil | Clay | (Brazil) Andrea Vieira | 2–6, 2–6 |
| Win | 6. | 1 April 1996 | Tampico, Mexico | Clay | (Mexico) Ana Paola González | 6–4, 6–3 |
| Win | 7. | 24 June 1996 | Campo Grande, Brazil | Hard | (Canada) Martina Nejedly | 6–2, 5–7, 6–4 |
| Loss | 8. | 1 July 1996 | Santos, Brazil | Clay | (Brazil) Andrea Vieira | 2–6, 6–2, 6–7 |
| Win | 9. | 8 July 1996 | São Paulo, Brazil | Clay | (Brazil) Vanessa Menga | 6–1, 6–1 |
| Loss | 10. | 15 March 1999 | Ciudad Victoria, Mexico | Hard | (United States) Stephanie Mabry | 5–7, 1–6 |

=== Doubles: 15 (10-5) ===
| Result | No. | Date | Tournament | Surface | Partner | Opponents | Score |
|---|---|---|---|---|---|---|---|
| Win | 1. | 7 November 1994 | Santo Domingo, Dominican Republic | Clay | (Spain) Noelia Serra | (Chile) Bárbara Castro (Chile) María-Alejandra Quezada | 5–1 ret. |
| Win | 2. | 26 June 1995 | Mexico City, Mexico | Hard | (Mexico) Melody Falcó | (Turkey) Gülberk Gültekin (United States) Mindy Weiner | 6–3, 6–3 |
| Win | 3. | 17 July 1995 | Santos, Brazil | Clay | (Colombia) Ximena Rodríguez | (Brazil) Vanessa Menga (Argentina) Valentina Solari | 5–7, 6–3, 6–1 |
| Loss | 4. | 31 July 1995 | Brasília, Brazil | Clay | (Argentina) Geraldine Aizenberg | (Brazil) Vanessa Menga (Brazil) Andrea Vieira | 4–6, 2–6 |
| Win | 5. | 1 April 1996 | Tampico, Mexico | Clay | (Mexico) Claudia Muciño | (Cuba) Yoannis Montesino (Cuba) Belkis Rodríguez | 6–2, 6–3 |
| Loss | 6. | 1 July 1996 | Santos, Brazil | Clay | (Brazil) Vanessa Menga | (Brazil) Luciana Tella (Brazil) Andrea Vieira | 6–3, 1–6, 3–6 |
| Win | 7. | 8 July 1996 | São Paulo, Brazil | Clay | (Brazil) Vanessa Menga | (Brazil) Luciana Tella (Brazil) Renata Diez | 6–7^{(6–8)}, 6–3, 6–2 |
| Win | 8. | 1 September 1996 | Sochi, Russia | Clay | (Brazil) Miriam D'Agostini | (Russia) Olga Ivanova (Russia) Anna Linkova | 6–4, 6–3 |
| Loss | 9. | 2 September 1996 | Spoleto, Italy | Clay | (Spain) Alicia Ortuño | (Brazil) Miriam D'Agostini (Portugal) Sofia Prazeres | 5–7, 4–6 |
| Loss | 10. | 28 October 1996 | Edinburgh, United Kingdom | Hard | (Germany) Syna Schmidle | (United Kingdom) Julie Pullin (United Kingdom) Lorna Woodroffe | 3–6, 4–6 |
| Win | 11. | 26 April 1999 | Coatzacoalcos, Mexico | Hard | (Mexico) Melody Falcó | (United States) Adria Engel (Slovakia) Alena Paulenková | 4–1 ret. |
| Win | 12. | 10 May 1999 | Tampico, Mexico | Hard | (Mexico) Melody Falcó | (Brazil) Joana Cortez (Brazil) Carla Tiene | 6–3, 4–6, 6–4 |
| Win | 13. | 17 May 1999 | Ciudad Juárez, Mexico | Hard | (Mexico) Melody Falcó | (Australia) Kylie Hunt (Australia) Nicole Sewell | 3–6, 6–1, 6–3 |
| Loss | 14. | 12 September 1999 | Mexico City, Mexico | Clay | (Mexico) Melody Falcó | (Brazil) Joana Cortez (Brazil) Vanessa Menga | 4–6, 2–6 |
| Win | 15. | 27 September 1999 | Montevideo, Uruguay | Clay | (Mexico) Melody Falcó | (Argentina) Jorgelina Cravero (Argentina) María Emilia Salerni | 6–3, 6–4 |
