= Gustavo Palafox =

Mexican tennis player

- Country (sports): Mexico
- Born: 15 November 1923; Guadalajara, Mexico
- Died: August 21, 2006 (aged 82); Fort Lauderdale, Florida, U.S.

Singles

Grand Slam singles results
- US Open: 3R (1952)

Team competitions
- Davis Cup: F^{Am} (1948, 1950, 1954, 1956)
Medal record
Men's tennis
Representing Mexico
Pan American Games
Gold medal – first place	1951 Buenos Aires	Mixed doubles
Gold medal – first place	1955 Mexico City	Men's doubles
Gold medal – first place	1955 Mexico City	Mixed doubles
Gold medal – first place	1959 Chicago	Men's doubles
Gold medal – first place	1959 Chicago	Mixed doubles
Bronze medal – third place	1951 Buenos Aires	Men's singles

Gustavo Palafox (15 November 1923 – 21 August 2006) was a Mexican tennis player.

== Life and career ==
Palafox won five Pan American Games gold medals during the 1950s.

He competed at the US National Championships four times and made the third round in 1952, with wins over Robert Kerdasha and Don Eisenberg, before a loss to 11th seed Gardnar Mulloy.

In Davis Cup tennis, Palafox took part in nine ties and 20 rubbers, for 10 wins. He beat Australian Ken McGregor in 1950 and four years later made history when he beat Vic Seixas, becoming the first Mexican to defeat an American in the Davis Cup.

Palafox died at the age of 82. in Fort Lauderdale, Florida in August 2006.
