= 1992 Davis Cup Americas Zone Group III =

International tennis competition

The Americas Zone was one of the three zones of the regional Davis Cup competition in 1992.

In the Americas Zone there were three different tiers, called groups, in which teams competed against each other to advance to the upper tier. Winners in Group III advanced to the Americas Zone Group II in 1992. All other teams remained in Group III.

== Participating nations ==
- Bolivia
- Costa Rica
- El Salvador
- Guatemala
- Haiti
- Jamaica
- Puerto Rico
- Trinidad and Tobago

=== Draw ===
- Venue: Maya Country Club, San Salvador, El Salvador
- Date: 19–22 March

Group A

	PUR	ESA	JAM	BOL	RR; W–L	Match; W–L	Set; W–L	Standings
Puerto Rico		3–0	2–1	3–0	3–0	8–1 (89%)	17–2 (89%)	1
El Salvador	0–3		3–0	3–0	2–1	6–3 (67%)	12–7 (63%)	2
Jamaica	1–2	0–3		3–0	1–2	4–5 (45%)	9–12 (43%)	3
Bolivia	0–3	0–3	0–3		0–3	0–9 (0%)	1–18 (5%)	4

Group B

	HAI	CRC	GUA	TRI	RR; W–L	Match; W–L	Set; W–L	Standings
Haiti		2–1	3–0	3–0	3–0	8–1 (89%)	15–5 (75%)	1
Costa Rica	1–2		3–0	3–0	2–1	7–2 (78%)	14–5 (74%)	2
Guatemala	0–3	0–3		2–1	1–2	2–7 (22%)	8–13 (38%)	3
Trinidad and Tobago	0–3	0–3	1–2		0–3	1–8 (11%)	3–17 (15%)	4

- Puerto Rico and Haiti promoted to Group II in 1993.

== Group A ==
=== El Salvador vs. Bolivia ===
El Salvador
3
Maya Country Club, San Salvador, El Salvador
19 March 1992

Bolivia
0

			1	2	3
1	(El Salvador) (Bolivia)	Manuel Antonio Tejada Ruiz; Ricardo Aguirre	7^{13} 6^{11}	6; 2
2	(El Salvador) (Bolivia)	Miguel Merz; Rodrigo Navarro	6; 0	6; 0
3	(El Salvador) (Bolivia)	Miguel Merz / Manuel Antonio Tejada Ruiz; Ricardo Aguirre / Rodrigo Navarro	7^{8} 6^{6}	6; 4

=== Jamaica vs. Puerto Rico ===
Jamaica
1
Maya Country Club, San Salvador, El Salvador
20 March 1992

Puerto Rico
2

			1	2	3
1	(Jamaica) (Puerto Rico)	Karl Hale; Juan Ríos	6^{4} 7^{7}	3; 6
2	(Jamaica) (Puerto Rico)	Doug Burke; Joey Rive	3; 6	6; 3	6; 4
3	(Jamaica) (Puerto Rico)	Doug Burke / Karl Hale; Miguel Nido / Joey Rive	3; 6	6^{4} 7^{7}

=== El Salvador vs. Jamaica ===
El Salvador
3
Maya Country Club, San Salvador, El Salvador
21 March 1992

Jamaica
0

			1	2	3
1	(El Salvador) (Jamaica)	Manuel Antonio Tejada Ruiz; Karl Hale	7; 5	6; 4
2	(El Salvador) (Jamaica)	Miguel Merz; Doug Burke	6; 3	6; 4
3	(El Salvador) (Jamaica)	Miguel Merz / Manuel Antonio Tejada Ruiz; Doug Burke / Karl Hale	3; 6	6; 3	6; 4

=== Bolivia vs. Puerto Rico ===
Bolivia
0
Maya Country Club, San Salvador, El Salvador
21 March 1992

Puerto Rico
3

			1	2	3
1	(Bolivia) (Puerto Rico)	Ricardo Aguirre; Juan Ríos	2; 6	5; 7
2	(Bolivia) (Puerto Rico)	Rodrigo Navarro; Miguel Nido	0; 6	1; 6
3	(Bolivia) (Puerto Rico)	Ricardo Aguirre / Antonio Serrate; Juan Ríos / Joey Rive	1; 6	1; 6

=== El Salvador vs. Puerto Rico ===
El Salvador
0
Maya Country Club, San Salvador, El Salvador
22 March 1992

Puerto Rico
3

			1	2	3
1	(El Salvador) (Puerto Rico)	Manuel Antonio Tejada Ruiz; Miguel Nido	2; 6	6^{10} 7^{12}
2	(El Salvador) (Puerto Rico)	Miguel Merz; Joey Rive	6^{5} 7^{7}	3; 6
3	(El Salvador) (Puerto Rico)	Miguel Merz / Manuel Antonio Tejada Ruiz; Miguel Nido / Joey Rive	3; 6	2; 6

=== Bolivia vs. Jamaica ===
Bolivia
0
Maya Country Club, San Salvador, El Salvador
22 March 1992

Jamaica
3

			1	2	3
1	(Bolivia) (Jamaica)	Ricardo Aguirre; Karl Hale	3; 6	5; 7
2	(Bolivia) (Jamaica)	Rodrigo Navarro; Doug Burke	2; 6	3; 6
3	(Bolivia) (Jamaica)	Ricardo Aguirre / Rodrigo Navarro; Doug Burke / Karl Hale	4; 6	6; 3	1; 6

== Group B ==
=== Costa Rica vs. Guatemala ===
Costa Rica
3
Maya Country Club, San Salvador, El Salvador
20 March 1992

Guatemala
0

			1	2	3
1	(Costa Rica) (Guatemala)	Kenneth Thome Bolanos; Luis Valencia	6; 3	7; 5
2	(Costa Rica) (Guatemala)	Rafael Ávalos Brenes; Daniel Chávez Morales	6; 4	6; 2
3	(Costa Rica) (Guatemala)	Fred Thome / Kenneth Thome Bolanos; Daniel Chávez Morales / Luis Valencia	6; 3	6; 2

=== Haiti vs. Trinidad and Tobago ===
Haiti
3
Maya Country Club, San Salvador, El Salvador
20 March 1992

Trinidad and Tobago
0

			1	2	3
1	(Haiti) (Trinidad and Tobago)	Patrice Baker; Jimmy Hodges	6; 0	6; 2
2	(Haiti) (Trinidad and Tobago)	Bertrand Madsen; Orville Adams	6; 3	7; 5
3	(Haiti) (Trinidad and Tobago)	Patrice Baker / Bertrand Madsen; Jimmy Hodges / Brian Khan	6; 3	6; 2

=== Costa Rica vs. Haiti ===
Costa Rica
1
Maya Country Club, San Salvador, El Salvador
21 March 1992

Haiti
2

			1	2	3
1	(Costa Rica) (Haiti)	Kenneth Thome Bolanos; Patrice Baker	6; 3	7^{7} 6^{0}
2	(Costa Rica) (Haiti)	Rafael Ávalos Brenes; Bertrand Madsen	3; 6	4; 6
3	(Costa Rica) (Haiti)	Fred Thome / Kenneth Thome Bolanos; Patrice Baker / Bertrand Madsen	3; 6	5; 7

=== Guatemala vs. Trinidad and Tobago ===
Guatemala
2
Maya Country Club, San Salvador, El Salvador
21 March 1992

Trinidad and Tobago
1

			1	2	3
1	(Guatemala) (Trinidad and Tobago)	Fernando Samayoa; Jimmy Hodges	6; 3	6; 2
2	(Guatemala) (Trinidad and Tobago)	Daniel Chávez Morales; Orville Adams	6; 2	6; 1
3	(Guatemala) (Trinidad and Tobago)	Daniel Chávez Morales / Fernando Samayoa; Orville Adams / Brian Khan	6^{6} 7^{8}	7^{7} 6^{5}	3; 6

=== Costa Rica vs. Trinidad and Tobago ===
Costa Rica
3
Maya Country Club, San Salvador, El Salvador
22 March 1992

Trinidad and Tobago
0

			1	2	3
1	(Costa Rica) (Trinidad and Tobago)	Kenneth Thome Bolanos; Brian Khan	6; 4	6; 0
2	(Costa Rica) (Trinidad and Tobago)	Rafael Ávalos Brenes; Orville Adams	6; 4	7^{8} 6^{6}
3	(Costa Rica) (Trinidad and Tobago)	Fred Thome / Kenneth Thome Bolanos; Orville Adams / Brian Khan	6; 2	6^{5} 7^{7}	6; 1

=== Guatemala vs. Haiti ===
Guatemala
0
Maya Country Club, San Salvador, El Salvador
22 March 1992

Haiti
3

			1	2	3
1	(Guatemala) (Haiti)	Fernando Samayoa; Patrice Baker	3; 6	6; 4	2; 6
2	(Guatemala) (Haiti)	Daniel Chávez Morales; Bertrand Madsen	7^{7} 6^{5}	2; 6	2; 6
3	(Guatemala) (Haiti)	Fernando Samayoa / Luis Valencia; Ruben Lamothe / Bertrand Madsen	6; 3	3; 6	1; 2	retired
