= 1993 Davis Cup Americas Zone Group III =

International tennis competition

The Americas Zone was one of the three zones of the regional Davis Cup competition in 1993.

In the Americas Zone there were three different tiers, called groups, in which teams competed against each other to advance to the upper tier. Winners in Group III advanced to the Americas Zone Group II in 1994. All other teams remained in Group III.

== Participating nations ==
- Barbados
- Bolivia
- Costa Rica
- Eastern Caribbean
- El Salvador
- Guatemala
- Jamaica
- Trinidad and Tobago

=== Draw ===
- Venue: Cariari Country Club, San José, Costa Rica
- Date: 8–14 March

	GUA	JAM	ESA	ECA	CRC	BOL	TRI	BAR	RR; W–L	Match; W–L	Set; W–L	Standings
Guatemala		3–0	2–1	1–2	2–1	3–0	3–0	3–0	6–1	17–4 (81%)	37–11 (77%)	1
Jamaica	0–3		2–1	2–1	3–0	3–0	2–1	2–1	6–1	14–7 (67%)	32–19 (63%)	2
El Salvador	1–2	1–2		2–1	2–1	2–1	2–1	2–1	5–2	12–9 (57%)	27–24 (53%)	3
Eastern Caribbean	2–1	1–2	1–2		3–0	1–2	2–1	3–0	4–3	13–8 (62%)	28–17 (62%)	4
Costa Rica	1–2	0–3	1–2	0–3		2–1	3–0	2–1	3–4	9–12 (43%)	26–28 (48%)	5
Bolivia	0–3	0–3	1–2	2–1	1–2		1–2	3–0	2–5	8–13 (38%)	19–28 (40%)	6
Trinidad and Tobago	0–3	1–2	1–2	1–2	0–3	2–1		1–2	1–6	6–15 (29%)	14–33 (30%)	7
Barbados	0–3	1–2	1–2	0–3	1–2	0–3	2–1		1–6	5–16 (24%)	12–35 (26%)	8

- Guatemala and Jamaica promoted to Group II in 1994.

== Results ==
=== Barbados vs. Eastern Caribbean ===
Barbados
0
Cariari Country Club, San José, Costa Rica
8 March 1993

Eastern Caribbean
3

			1	2	3
1	(Barbados) (Eastern Caribbean)	Bernard Frost; Gavaskar Williams	1; 6	2; 6
2	(Barbados) (Eastern Caribbean)	Richard Taylor; Vernon Lewis	2; 6	5; 7
3	(Barbados) (Eastern Caribbean)	Bernard Frost / Sydney Lopez; Christopher Richards / Gavaskar Williams	6^{4} 7^{7}	4; 6

=== Bolivia vs. Guatemala ===
Bolivia
0
Cariari Country Club, San José, Costa Rica
8 March 1993

Guatemala
3

			1	2	3
1	(Bolivia) (Guatemala)	Antonio Serrate; Daniel Chávez Morales	3; 6	4; 6
2	(Bolivia) (Guatemala)	Ricardo Aguirre; Fernando Samayoa	0; 6	4; 6
3	(Bolivia) (Guatemala)	Ricardo Aguirre / Antonio Serrate; Daniel Chávez Morales / Jacobo Chávez	1; 6	1; 6

=== Costa Rica vs. El Salvador ===
Costa Rica
1
Cariari Country Club, San José, Costa Rica
8 March 1993

El Salvador
2

			1	2	3
1	(Costa Rica) (El Salvador)	Mario Delgado; Manuel Antonio Tejada Ruiz	6; 2	3; 6	2; 6
2	(Costa Rica) (El Salvador)	Rafael Ávalos Brenes; Miguel Merz	6; 4	6; 4
3	(Costa Rica) (El Salvador)	Mario Delgado / Carlos Muñoz; Allan López / Miguel Merz	4; 6	7; 5	3; 6

=== Jamaica vs. Trinidad and Tobago ===
Jamaica
2
Cariari Country Club, San José, Costa Rica
8 March 1993

Trinidad and Tobago
1

			1	2	3
1	(Jamaica) (Trinidad and Tobago)	Peter Campbell; Shane Stone	6; 2	6; 4
2	(Jamaica) (Trinidad and Tobago)	Karl Hale; Mark Webster	6; 2	6; 2
3	(Jamaica) (Trinidad and Tobago)	Karl Hale / Nicholas Malcolm; James Jack / Mark Webster	7^{8} 6^{6}	4; 6	9; 11

=== Barbados vs. El Salvador ===
Barbados
1
Cariari Country Club, San José, Costa Rica
9 March 1993

El Salvador
2

			1	2	3
1	(Barbados) (El Salvador)	Craig Smith; Manuel Antonio Tejada Ruiz	7; 5	5; 7	4; 6
2	(Barbados) (El Salvador)	Richard Taylor; Miguel Merz	0; 6	0; 6
3	(Barbados) (El Salvador)	Bernard Frost / Sydney Lopez; Miguel Ángel Campos / Allan López	6^{4} 7^{7}	6; 3	6; 4

=== Bolivia vs. Jamaica ===
Bolivia
0
Cariari Country Club, San José, Costa Rica
9 March 1993

Jamaica
3

			1	2	3
1	(Bolivia) (Jamaica)	Ricardo Aguirre; Peter Campbell	6^{4} 7^{7}	3; 6
2	(Bolivia) (Jamaica)	Jose Medrano; Karl Hale	4; 6	2; 6
3	(Bolivia) (Jamaica)	Ricardo Aguirre / Jose Medrano; Peter Campbell / Karl Hale	7; 5	4; 6	3; 6

=== Costa Rica vs. Trinidad and Tobago ===
Costa Rica
3
Cariari Country Club, San José, Costa Rica
9 March 1993

Trinidad and Tobago
0

			1	2	3
1	(Costa Rica) (Trinidad and Tobago)	Mario Delgado; James Jack	7; 5	2; 6	6; 2
2	(Costa Rica) (Trinidad and Tobago)	Rafael Ávalos Brenes; Mark Webster	6; 0	6; 1
3	(Costa Rica) (Trinidad and Tobago)	Rafael Ávalos Brenes / Carlos Muñoz; James Jack / Mark Webster	7; 5	6; 4

=== Eastern Caribbean vs. Guatemala ===
Eastern Caribbean
2
Cariari Country Club, San José, Costa Rica
9 March 1993

Guatemala
1

			1	2	3
1	(Eastern Caribbean) (Guatemala)	Gavaskar Williams; Daniel Chávez Morales	5; 7	6; 2	6; 2
2	(Eastern Caribbean) (Guatemala)	Vernon Lewis; Fernando Samayoa	6; 3	6; 4
3	(Eastern Caribbean) (Guatemala)	Christopher Richards / Gavaskar Williams; Daniel Chávez Morales / Jacobo Chávez	2; 6	6^{3} 7^{7}

=== Barbados vs. Jamaica ===
Barbados
1
Cariari Country Club, San José, Costa Rica
10 March 1993

Jamaica
2

			1	2	3
1	(Barbados) (Jamaica)	Craig Smith; Nicholas Malcolm	7^{7} 6^{5}	6; 4
2	(Barbados) (Jamaica)	Richard Taylor; Karl Hale	2; 6	3; 6
3	(Barbados) (Jamaica)	Bernard Frost / Sydney Lopez; Doug Burke / Karl Hale	1; 6	4; 6

=== Bolivia vs. Trinidad and Tobago ===
Bolivia
1
Cariari Country Club, San José, Costa Rica
10 March 1993

Trinidad and Tobago
2

			1	2	3
1	(Bolivia) (Trinidad and Tobago)	Ricardo Aguirre; James Jack	2; 6	2; 6
2	(Bolivia) (Trinidad and Tobago)	Jose Medrano; Mark Webster	6; 2	7^{7} 6^{0}
3	(Bolivia) (Trinidad and Tobago)	Ricardo Aguirre / Jose Medrano; James Jack / Mark Webster	4; 6	3; 6

=== Costa Rica vs. Guatemala ===
Costa Rica
1
Cariari Country Club, San José, Costa Rica
10 March 1993

Guatemala
2

			1	2	3
1	(Costa Rica) (Guatemala)	Carlos Muñoz; Daniel Chávez Morales	6; 3	3; 6	2; 6
2	(Costa Rica) (Guatemala)	Rafael Ávalos Brenes; Fernando Samayoa	6^{5} 7^{7}	6; 3	6; 3
3	(Costa Rica) (Guatemala)	Rafael Ávalos Brenes / Carlos Muñoz; Daniel Chávez Morales / Jacobo Chávez	2; 6	4; 6

=== Eastern Caribbean vs. El Salvador ===
Eastern Caribbean
1
Cariari Country Club, San José, Costa Rica
10 March 1993

El Salvador
2

			1	2	3
1	(Eastern Caribbean) (El Salvador)	Gavaskar Williams; Allan López	7^{7} 6^{2}	6; 3
2	(Eastern Caribbean) (El Salvador)	Vernon Lewis; Miguel Merz	6^{4} 7^{7}	3; 6
3	(Eastern Caribbean) (El Salvador)	Christopher Richards / Gavaskar Williams; Allan López / Miguel Merz	4; 6	6^{4} 7^{7}

=== Barbados vs. Bolivia ===
Barbados
0
Cariari Country Club, San José, Costa Rica
11 March 1993

Bolivia
3

			1	2	3
1	(Barbados) (Bolivia)	Craig Smith; Antonio Serrate	3; 6	4; 6
2	(Barbados) (Bolivia)	Richard Taylor; Jose Medrano	2; 6	3; 6
3	(Barbados) (Bolivia)	Bernard Frost / Sydney Lopez; Ricardo Aguirre / Jose Medrano	2; 6	5; 7

=== Costa Rica vs. Eastern Caribbean ===
Costa Rica
0
Cariari Country Club, San José, Costa Rica
11 March 1993

Eastern Caribbean
3

			1	2	3
1	(Costa Rica) (Eastern Caribbean)	Juan Ramón González; Gavaskar Williams	4; 6	2; 6
2	(Costa Rica) (Eastern Caribbean)	Mario Delgado; Vernon Lewis	4; 6	0; 6
3	(Costa Rica) (Eastern Caribbean)	Mario Delgado / Juan Ramón González; Richard Hughes / Christopher Richards	4; 6	1; 6

=== El Salvador vs. Jamaica ===
El Salvador
1
Cariari Country Club, San José, Costa Rica
11–12 March 1993

Jamaica
2

			1	2	3
1	(El Salvador) (Jamaica)	Allan López; Doug Burke	2; 6	2; 6
2	(El Salvador) (Jamaica)	Miguel Merz; Karl Hale	4; 6	6; 4	6; 4
3	(El Salvador) (Jamaica)	Allan López / Miguel Merz; Doug Burke / Karl Hale	3; 6	6; 4	21; 23

=== Guatemala vs. Trinidad and Tobago ===
Guatemala
3
Cariari Country Club, San José, Costa Rica
11 March 1993

Trinidad and Tobago
0

			1	2	3
1	(Guatemala) (Trinidad and Tobago)	Jacobo Chávez; James Jack	6; 3	6; 2
2	(Guatemala) (Trinidad and Tobago)	Fernando Samayoa; Shane Stone	6; 3	6; 1
3	(Guatemala) (Trinidad and Tobago)	Daniel Chávez Morales / Jacobo Chávez; Ivor Grazette / Shane Stone	6; 1	6; 0

=== Barbados vs. Trinidad and Tobago ===
Barbados
2
Cariari Country Club, San José, Costa Rica
12 March 1993

Trinidad and Tobago
1

			1	2	3
1	(Barbados) (Trinidad and Tobago)	Craig Smith; Shane Stone	6; 2	6; 3
2	(Barbados) (Trinidad and Tobago)	Bernard Frost; Mark Webster	3; 6	2; 6
3	(Barbados) (Trinidad and Tobago)	Bernard Frost / Sydney Lopez; James Jack / Mark Webster	6^{2} 7^{7}	6; 4	6; 3

=== Bolivia vs. Costa Rica ===
Bolivia
1
Cariari Country Club, San José, Costa Rica
12 March 1993

Costa Rica
2

			1	2	3
1	(Bolivia) (Costa Rica)	Antonio Serrate; Juan Ramón González	6^{4} 7^{7}	6; 4	6; 8
2	(Bolivia) (Costa Rica)	Jose Medrano; Rafael Ávalos Brenes	2; 6	6; 3	2; 6
3	(Bolivia) (Costa Rica)	Ricardo Aguirre / Jose Medrano; Rafael Ávalos Brenes / Juan Ramón González	6; 3	3; 6	6; 2

=== Eastern Caribbean vs. Jamaica ===
Eastern Caribbean
1
Cariari Country Club, San José, Costa Rica
12 March 1993

Jamaica
2

			1	2	3
1	(Eastern Caribbean) (Jamaica)	Gavaskar Williams; Doug Burke	6; 2	6; 1
2	(Eastern Caribbean) (Jamaica)	Vernon Lewis; Karl Hale	4; 6	6; 3	3; 6
3	(Eastern Caribbean) (Jamaica)	Vernon Lewis / Christopher Richards; Doug Burke / Karl Hale	5; 7	3; 6

=== El Salvador vs. Guatemala ===
El Salvador
1
Cariari Country Club, San José, Costa Rica
12 March 1993

Guatemala
2

			1	2	3
1	(El Salvador) (Guatemala)	Allan López; Daniel Chávez Morales	4; 6	4; 6
2	(El Salvador) (Guatemala)	Miguel Merz; Fernando Samayoa	4; 6	6; 3	6; 4
3	(El Salvador) (Guatemala)	Allan López / Miguel Merz; Daniel Chávez Morales / Jacobo Chávez	4; 6	6^{3} 7^{7}

=== Barbados vs. Guatemala ===
Barbados
0
Cariari Country Club, San José, Costa Rica
13 March 1993

Guatemala
3

			1	2	3
1	(Barbados) (Guatemala)	Sydney Lopez; Jacobo Chávez	5; 7	0; 6
2	(Barbados) (Guatemala)	Richard Taylor; Fernando Samayoa	2; 6	5; 7
3	(Barbados) (Guatemala)	Bernard Frost / Sydney Lopez; Daniel Chávez Morales / Jacobo Chávez	5; 7	4; 6

=== Bolivia vs. El Salvador ===
Bolivia
1
Cariari Country Club, San José, Costa Rica
13 March 1993

El Salvador
2

			1	2	3
1	(Bolivia) (El Salvador)	Antonio Serrate; Manuel Antonio Tejada Ruiz	6; 1	7; 5
2	(Bolivia) (El Salvador)	Jose Medrano; Miguel Merz	4; 6	6; 4	4; 6
3	(Bolivia) (El Salvador)	Ricardo Aguirre / Jose Medrano; Allan López / Miguel Merz	6^{4} 7^{7}	5; 6

=== Costa Rica vs. Jamaica ===
Costa Rica
0
Cariari Country Club, San José, Costa Rica
13 March 1993

Jamaica
3

			1	2	3
1	(Costa Rica) (Jamaica)	Mario Delgado; Doug Burke	2; 6	0; 6
2	(Costa Rica) (Jamaica)	Rafael Ávalos Brenes; Karl Hale	6^{5} 7^{7}	6; 4	10; 12
3	(Costa Rica) (Jamaica)	Mario Delgado / Juan Ramón González; Peter Campbell / Nicholas Malcolm	7^{8} 6^{6}	2; 6	6; 8

=== Eastern Caribbean vs. Trinidad and Tobago ===
Eastern Caribbean
2
Cariari Country Club, San José, Costa Rica
13 March 1993

Trinidad and Tobago
1

			1	2	3
1	(Eastern Caribbean) (Trinidad and Tobago)	Gavaskar Williams; Ivor Grazette	6; 4	6; 2
2	(Eastern Caribbean) (Trinidad and Tobago)	Vernon Lewis; Mark Webster	6^{4} 7^{7}	6; 4	3; 6
3	(Eastern Caribbean) (Trinidad and Tobago)	Richard Hughes / Gavaskar Williams; Ivor Grazette / James Jack	6; 2	7^{7} 6^{5}

=== Barbados vs. Costa Rica ===
Barbados
1
Cariari Country Club, San José, Costa Rica
14 March 1993

Costa Rica
2

			1	2	3
1	(Barbados) (Costa Rica)	Bernard Frost; Mario Delgado	7; 5	6^{6} 7^{8}	3; 6
2	(Barbados) (Costa Rica)	Richard Taylor; Rafael Ávalos Brenes	2; 6	3; 6
3	(Barbados) (Costa Rica)	Bernard Frost / Sydney Lopez; Rafael Ávalos Brenes / Juan Ramón González	6; 4	3; 6	9; 7

=== Bolivia vs. Eastern Caribbean ===
Bolivia
2
Cariari Country Club, San José, Costa Rica
14 March 1993

Eastern Caribbean
1

			1	2	3
1	(Bolivia) (Eastern Caribbean)	Antonio Serrate; Gavaskar Williams	2; 6	4; 6
2	(Bolivia) (Eastern Caribbean)	Jose Medrano; Vernon Lewis	7; 5	6; 2
3	(Bolivia) (Eastern Caribbean)	Ricardo Aguirre / Jose Medrano; Richard Hughes / Christopher Richards	6; 4	6; 2

=== El Salvador vs. Trinidad and Tobago ===
El Salvador
2
Cariari Country Club, San José, Costa Rica
14 March 1993

Trinidad and Tobago
1

			1	2	3
1	(El Salvador) (Trinidad and Tobago)	Allan López; James Jack	6; 0	4; 6	3; 6
2	(El Salvador) (Trinidad and Tobago)	Miguel Merz; Mark Webster	6; 4	7^{7} 6^{2}
3	(El Salvador) (Trinidad and Tobago)	Allan López / Miguel Merz; Ivor Grazette / James Jack	6; 2	7; 5

=== Guatemala vs. Jamaica ===
Guatemala
3
Cariari Country Club, San José, Costa Rica
14 March 1993

Jamaica
0

			1	2	3
1	(Guatemala) (Jamaica)	Daniel Chávez Morales; Peter Campbell	6; 4	6; 1
2	(Guatemala) (Jamaica)	Fernando Samayoa; Nicholas Malcolm	6^{4} 7^{7}	6; 1	6; 0
3	(Guatemala) (Jamaica)	Freddy Salazar / Fernando Samayoa; Peter Campbell / Nicholas Malcolm	3; 6	6; 2	14; 12
