= List of Pan American Games medalists in tennis =

This is the complete list of Pan American Games medalists in tennis from 1951 to 2023. Tennis was not held in the 1971 edition, but has otherwise been played at every games.

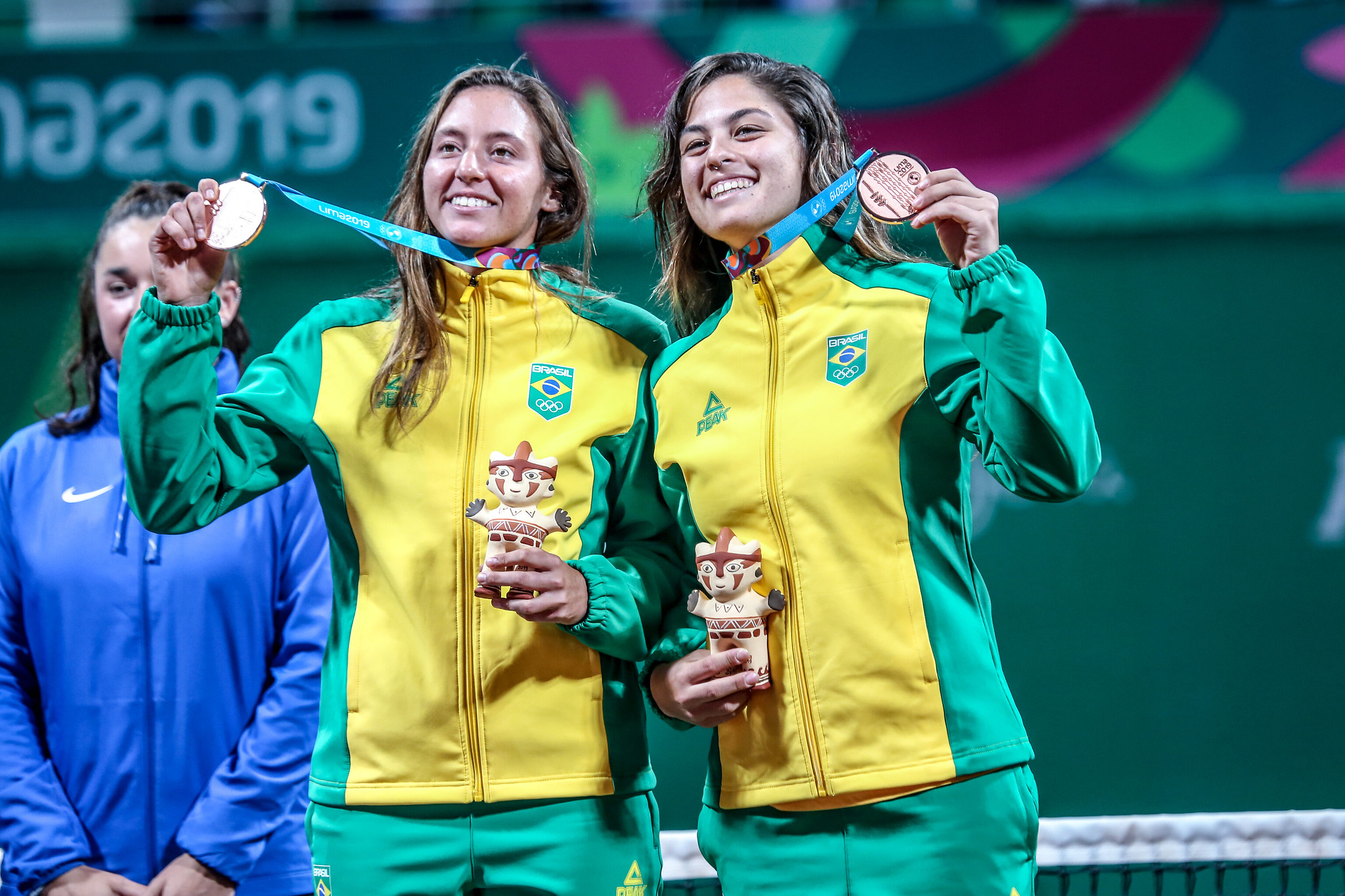
Brazilians Luisa Stefani and Carolina Meligeni Alves, women's doubles bronze medalists at the 2019 Pan American Games.

== Current events ==
=== Men's singles ===
Event	Gold	Silver	Bronze
1951 Buenos Aires	Enrique Morea; Argentina	Alejo Russell; Argentina	(Mexico) Gustavo Palafox (MEX)
1955 Mexico City	Art Larsen; United States	Enrique Morea; Argentina	Luis Ayala; Chile
1959 Chicago	Luis Ayala; Chile	(Canada) Robert Bédard (CAN)	Jon Douglas; United States
1963 São Paulo	Ronald Barnes; Brazil	(Mexico) Mario Llamas (MEX)	(Mexico) Francisco Contreras (MEX)
1967 Winnipeg	Thomas Koch; Brazil	Herb Fitzgibbon; United States	Arthur Ashe; United States
1975 Mexico City	Butch Walts; United States	Adolfo González; Mexico	Freddy de Jesús; Puerto Rico
1979 San Juan	Mel Purcell; United States	Ricardo Acuña; Chile	Andrés Gómez; Ecuador
1983 Caracas	Greg Holmes; United States	Fernando Pérez; Mexico	Christian Miniussi; Argentina
1987 Indianapolis	Fernando Roese; Brazil	Al Parker; United States	Luke Jensen; United States
1991 Havana	Luis Herrera; Mexico	David DiLucia; United States	Marcelo Saliola; Brazil
1995 Mar del Plata	Hernán Gumy; Argentina	Javier Frana; Argentina	Jimy Szymanski; Venezuela
1999 Winnipeg	Paul Goldstein; United States	Cecil Mamiit; United States	David Nalbandian; Argentina
1999 Winnipeg	Paul Goldstein; United States	Cecil Mamiit; United States	Paulo Taicher; Brazil
2003 Santo Domingo	Fernando Meligeni; Brazil	Marcelo Ríos; Chile	José de Armas; Venezuela
2003 Santo Domingo	Fernando Meligeni; Brazil	Marcelo Ríos; Chile	Alex Kim; United States
2007 Rio de Janeiro	Flávio Saretta; Brazil	Adrián García; Chile	Eduardo Schwank; Argentina
2011 Guadalajara	Robert Farah; Colombia	Rogério Dutra Silva; Brazil	Víctor Estrella Burgos; Dominican Republic
2015 Toronto	Facundo Bagnis; Argentina	Nicolás Barrientos; Colombia	Dennis Novikov; United States
2019 Lima	João Menezes; Brazil	Tomás Barrios; Chile	Guido Andreozzi; Argentina
2023 Santiago	Facundo Díaz; Argentina	Tomás Barrios; Chile	Thiago Monteiro; Brazil

=== Women's singles ===
Event	Gold	Silver	Bronze
1951 Buenos Aires	Mary Terán de Weiss; Argentina	Felisa Piédrola; Argentina	(Mexico) Melita Ramírez (MEX)
1955 Mexico City	(Mexico) Rosie Reyes (MEX)	(Mexico) Yola Ramírez (MEX)	Ingrid Metzner; Brazil
1959 Chicago	Althea Gibson; United States	Yola Ramírez; Mexico	Dorothy Knode; United States
1963 São Paulo	Maria Esther Bueno; Brazil	(Mexico) Yola Ramírez (MEX)	Darlene Hard; United States
1967 Winnipeg	(Mexico) Elena Subirats (MEX)	Patsy Rippy; United States	Jane Albert; United States
1975 Mexico City	Lele Forood; United States	Patricia Medrado; Brazil	Leyla Musalem; Chile
1979 San Juan	Susan Hagey; United States	Trey Lewis; United States	Maluca Llamas; Mexico
1983 Caracas	Gretchen Rush; United States	Gigi Fernández; Puerto Rico	Heliane Steden; Mexico
1987 Indianapolis	Gisele Miró; Brazil	Adriana Isaza; Colombia	María Méndez; Argentina
1987 Indianapolis	Gisele Miró; Brazil	Adriana Isaza; Colombia	Patricia Miller; Uruguay
1991 Havana	Pam Shriver; United States	Joelle Schad; Dominican Republic	Andrea Vieira; Brazil
1995 Mar del Plata	Florencia Labat; Argentina	Ann Grossman; United States	Chanda Rubin; United States
1999 Winnipeg	María Vento-Kabchi; Venezuela	Tara Snyder; United States	Mariana Díaz Oliva; Argentina
1999 Winnipeg	María Vento-Kabchi; Venezuela	Tara Snyder; United States	Alexandra Stevenson; United States
2003 Santo Domingo	Milagros Sequera; Venezuela	Sarah Taylor; United States	Kristina Brandi; Puerto Rico
2003 Santo Domingo	Milagros Sequera; Venezuela	Sarah Taylor; United States	Ansley Cargill; United States
2007 Rio de Janeiro	Milagros Sequera; Venezuela	Mariana Duque Mariño; Colombia	Betina Jozami; Argentina
2011 Guadalajara	Irina Falconi; United States	Monica Puig; Puerto Rico	Christina McHale; United States
2015 Toronto	Mariana Duque Mariño; Colombia	Victoria Rodríguez; Mexico	Monica Puig; Puerto Rico
2019 Lima	Nadia Podoroska; Argentina	Caroline Dolehide; United States	Verónica Cepede Royg; Paraguay
2023 Santiago	Laura Pigossi; Brazil	María Carlé; Argentina	Julia Riera; Argentina

=== Men's doubles ===
Event	Gold	Silver	Bronze
1951 Buenos Aires	Enrique Morea and Alejo Russell; Argentina	Carlos Sanhueza and Luis Ayala; Chile	Gustavo Palafox and Anselmo Puente; Mexico
1955 Mexico City	Mario Llamas and Gustavo Palafox; Mexico	Enrique Morea and Alejo Russell; Argentina	Edward Moylan and Art Larsen; United States
1959 Chicago	Antonio Palafox and Gustavo Palafox; Mexico	Mario Llamas and Francisco Contreras; Mexico	Grant Golden and Mike Franks; United States
1963 São Paulo	Ronald Barnes and Carlos Fernandes; Brazil	Juan Arredondo and Vicente Zarazúa; Mexico	Iarte Adam and Thomaz Koch; Brazil
1967 Winnipeg	Thomaz Koch and José Edison Mandarino; Brazil	Marcello Lara and Joaquín Loyo-Mayo; Mexico	Pancho Guzmán and Miguel Olvera; Ecuador
1975 Mexico City	Butch Walts and Bruce Manson; United States	Adolfo González and Raúl Contreras; Mexico	João Soares and José Schmidt; Brazil
1979 San Juan	Andy Kohlberg and Mel Purcell; United States	Héctor Pérez and Ricardo Acuña; Chile	Ricky Diaz; Ernie Fernández; Puerto Rico
1983 Caracas	Eric Korita and Jon Levine; United States	Fernando Pérez Pascal and Jorge Lozano; Mexico	Iñaki Calvo and Carlos Claverie; Venezuela
1987 Indianapolis	Luke Jensen and Patrick McEnroe; United States	Agustín Moreno and Fernando Pérez Pascal; Mexico	Fred Thome and Kenneth Thome; Costa Rica
1987 Indianapolis	Luke Jensen and Patrick McEnroe; United States	Agustín Moreno and Fernando Pérez Pascal; Mexico	Daniel Chavez and Fabio Sical; Guatemala
1991 Havana	Miguel Nido and Joey Rive; Puerto Rico	Oliver Fernández and Gerardo Martínez; Mexico	Juan Pino and Mario Tabares; Cuba
1991 Havana	Miguel Nido and Joey Rive; Puerto Rico	Oliver Fernández and Gerardo Martínez; Mexico	Patrick Baumeler and Américo Venero; Peru
1995 Mar del Plata	Javier Frana and Luis Lobo; Argentina	Juan Carlos Bianchi and Nicolás Pereira; Venezuela	Sergio Cortés and Gabriel Silberstein; Chile
1995 Mar del Plata	Javier Frana and Luis Lobo; Argentina	Juan Carlos Bianchi and Nicolás Pereira; Venezuela	Ricardo Herrera and Mario Pacheco; Mexico
1999 Winnipeg	André Sá and Paulo Taicher; Brazil	Marco Osorio and Óscar Ortiz; Mexico	Bob Bryan and Mike Bryan; United States
1999 Winnipeg	André Sá and Paulo Taicher; Brazil	Marco Osorio and Óscar Ortiz; Mexico	Maurice Ruah and Yohny Romero; Venezuela
2003 Santo Domingo	Santiago González and Alejandro Hernández; Mexico	Adrián García and Marcelo Ríos; Chile	Cristian Villagrán and Carlos Berlocq; Argentina
2003 Santo Domingo	Santiago González and Alejandro Hernández; Mexico	Adrián García and Marcelo Ríos; Chile	Alex Bogomolov Jr. and Jeff Morrison; United States
2007 Rio de Janeiro	Horacio Zeballos and Eduardo Schwank; Argentina	Adrián García and Jorge Aguilar; Chile	Santiago González and Víctor Romero; Mexico
2011 Guadalajara	Juan Sebastián Cabal and Robert Farah; Colombia	Julio César Campozano and Roberto Quiroz; Ecuador	Nicholas Monroe and Greg Ouellette; United States
2015 Toronto	Nicolás Jarry and Hans Podlipnik Castillo; Chile	Guido Andreozzi and Facundo Bagnis; Argentina	Gonzalo Escobar and Emilio Gómez; Ecuador
2019 Lima	Gonzalo Escobar and Roberto Quiroz; Ecuador	Guido Andreozzi and Facundo Bagnis; Argentina	Sergio Galdós and Juan Pablo Varillas; Peru
2023 Santiago	Gustavo Heide and Marcelo Demoliner; Brazil	Tomás Barrios and Alejandro Tabilo; Chile	Nick Hardt and Roberto Cid Subervi; Dominican Republic

=== Women's doubles ===
Event	Gold	Silver	Bronze
1951 Buenos Aires	Mary Terán de Weiss and Felisa Piédrola; Argentina	Hilde Heyn and Melita Ramírez; Mexico	Helena Stark and Silvia Villari; Brazil
1955 Mexico City	Rosa María Reyes and Esther Reyes; Mexico	Edna Buding and Graciela Lombardi; Argentina	Ingrid Metzner and Maria Esther Bueno; Brazil
1959 Chicago	Yolanda Ramírez and Rosa María Reyes; Mexico	Althea Gibson and Karol Fageros; United States	María Hernández and Melita Ramírez; Mexico
1963 São Paulo	Darlene Hard and Carole Caldwell; United States	Maria Esther Bueno and Maureen Schwartz; Brazil	Yolanda Ramírez and Elena Subirats; Mexico
1967 Winnipeg	Jane Albert and Patsy Rippy; United States	María Eugenia Guzmán and Ana María Ycaza; Ecuador	Faye Urban and Vicki Berner; Canada
1975 Mexico City	Sandy Stap and Stephanie Tolleson; United States	Maria Cristina Andrade and Wanda Ferraz; Brazil	Iluminada Concepción and Martha Dominguez; Cuba
1979 San Juan	Ann Henricksson and Susan Hagey; United States	Nicole Marois and Hélène Pelletier; Canada	Gigi Fernández and Crissy González; Puerto Rico
1983 Caracas	Gretchen Rush and Louise Allen; United States	Gigi Fernández and Marilda Julia; Puerto Rico	Claudia Hernández and Alejandra Vallejo; Mexico
1987 Indianapolis	Sonia Hahn and Ronni Reis; United States	María Méndez and Andrea Tiezzi; Argentina	Lucila Becerra and Claudia Hernández; Mexico
1987 Indianapolis	Sonia Hahn and Ronni Reis; United States	María Méndez and Andrea Tiezzi; Argentina	Marilda Julia and Emilie Viqueira; Puerto Rico
1991 Havana	Pam Shriver and Donna Faber; United States	Andrea Vieira and Cláudia Chabalgoity; Brazil	Aránzazu Gallardo and Isabela Petrov; Mexico
1991 Havana	Pam Shriver and Donna Faber; United States	Andrea Vieira and Cláudia Chabalgoity; Brazil	Paula Cabezas and Paulina Sepúlveda; Chile
1995 Mar del Plata	Mercedes Paz and Patricia Tarabini; Argentina	Ann Grossman and Chanda Rubin; United States	Andrea Vieira and Luciana Tella; Brazil
1995 Mar del Plata	Mercedes Paz and Patricia Tarabini; Argentina	Ann Grossman and Chanda Rubin; United States	Lucila Becerra and Xóchitl Escobedo; Mexico
1999 Winnipeg	Joana Cortez and Vanessa Menga; Brazil	Bárbara Castro and Paula Cabezas; Chile	Mariana Díaz Oliva and Clarisa Fernández; Argentina
1999 Winnipeg	Joana Cortez and Vanessa Menga; Brazil	Bárbara Castro and Paula Cabezas; Chile	Renata Kolbovic and Aneta Soukup; Canada
2003 Santo Domingo	Bruna Colósio and Joana Cortez; Brazil	Kristina Brandi and Vilmarie Castellvi; Puerto Rico	Yamile Fors and Yanet Núñez; Cuba
2003 Santo Domingo	Bruna Colósio and Joana Cortez; Brazil	Kristina Brandi and Vilmarie Castellvi; Puerto Rico	Karin Palme and Melissa Torres; Mexico
2007 Rio de Janeiro	Betina Jozami and Jorgelina Cravero; Argentina	Mariana Duque Mariño and Karen Castiblanco; Colombia	Teliana Pereira and Joana Cortez; Brazil
2011 Guadalajara	María Irigoyen and Florencia Molinero; Argentina	Irina Falconi and Christina McHale; United States	Catalina Castaño and Mariana Duque Mariño; Colombia
2015 Toronto	Gabriela Dabrowski and Carol Zhao; Canada	Victoria Rodríguez and Marcela Zacarías; Mexico	María Irigoyen and Paula Ormaechea; Argentina
2019 Lima	Usue Arconada and Caroline Dolehide; United States	Verónica Cepede Royg and Montserrat González; Paraguay	Carolina Meligeni and Luisa Stefani; Brazil
2023 Santiago	Laura Pigossi and Luisa Stefani; Brazil	María Herazo González and María Paulina Pérez; Colombia	María Carlé and Julia Riera; Argentina

=== Mixed doubles ===
Event	Gold	Silver	Bronze
1951 Buenos Aires	Melita Ramírez and Gustavo Palafox; Mexico	Felisa Piédrola and Enrique Morea; Argentina	Mary Terán de Weiss and Alejo Russell; Argentina
1955 Mexico City	Yolanda Ramírez and Gustavo Palafox; Mexico	Felisa Piédrola and Enrique Morea; Argentina	Mary Terán de Weiss and Alejo Russell; Argentina
1959 Chicago	Yolanda Ramírez and Gustavo Palafox; Mexico	Rosie Reyes and Francisco Contreras; Mexico	Althea Gibson and Grant Golden; United States
1963 São Paulo	Yolanda Ramírez and Francisco Contreras; Mexico	Thomaz Koch and Maria Esther Bueno; Brazil	Darlene Hard and Frank Froehling; United States
1967 Winnipeg	Jane Albert and Arthur Ashe; United States	Elena Subirats and Luis García; Mexico	María Eugenia Guzmán and Pancho Guzmán; Ecuador
1975 Mexico City	Lele Forood and Hank Pfister; United States	Freddy de Jesús and Maria Annexy; Puerto Rico	Adolfo González and Alejandra Vallejo; Mexico
1979 San Juan	Marlin Noriega and Juan Boveda; Venezuela	Ann Henricksson and Fritz Buehning; United States	Alejandra Vallejo and Javier Ordaz; Mexico
1983 Caracas	Nuria Alasia and Iñaki Calvo; Venezuela	Alejandra Vallejo and Jorge Lozano; Mexico	Linda Gates and Greg Holmes; United States
1987 Indianapolis	Lucila Becerra and Gilberto Cicero; Mexico	Andrea Tiezzi and Pablo Albano; Argentina	Fernando Roese and Gisele Miró; Brazil
1987 Indianapolis	Lucila Becerra and Gilberto Cicero; Mexico	Andrea Tiezzi and Pablo Albano; Argentina	Belkis Rodríguez and Juan Pino; Cuba
1991 Havana	Pam Shriver and David DiLucia; United States	William Kyriakos and Cláudia Chabalgoity; Brazil	Rafael Moreno and Joelle Schad; Dominican Republic
1991 Havana	Pam Shriver and David DiLucia; United States	William Kyriakos and Cláudia Chabalgoity; Brazil	Jaime Frontera and Emilie Viqueira; Puerto Rico
1995 Mar del Plata	Shaun Stafford and Jack Waite; United States	Luis Lobo and Patricia Tarabini; Argentina	Juan Pino and Belkis Rodríguez; Cuba
2011 Guadalajara	Ana Paula de la Peña and Santiago González; Mexico	Andrea Koch Benvenuto and Guillermo Rivera Aránguiz; Chile	Ana Clara Duarte and Rogério Dutra Silva; Brazil
2015 Toronto	María Irigoyen and Guido Andreozzi; Argentina	Gabriela Dabrowski and Philip Bester; Canada	Verónica Cepede Royg and Diego Galeano; Paraguay
2019 Lima	Alexa Guarachi and Nicolás Jarry; Chile	Noelia Zeballos and Federico Zeballos; Bolivia	Anastasia Iamachkine and Sergio Galdós; Peru
2023 Santiago	Yuliana Lizarazo and Nicolás Barrientos; Colombia	Luisa Stefani and Marcelo Demoliner; Brazil	Martina Capurro Taborda and Facundo Díaz; Argentina

== Discontinued events ==
=== Men's team ===
Event	Gold	Silver	Bronze
1991 Havana	Brazil	Puerto Rico	Chile
1991 Havana	Brazil	Puerto Rico	Cuba
1995 Mar del Plata	Argentina	Uruguay	Chile
1995 Mar del Plata	Argentina	Uruguay	United States

=== Women's team ===
Event	Gold	Silver	Bronze
1991 Havana	Brazil	Venezuela	Chile
1991 Havana	Brazil	Venezuela	Cuba
1995 Mar del Plata	Argentina	Chile	Brazil
1995 Mar del Plata	Argentina	Chile	United States
