= 1994 Davis Cup Americas Zone Group III =

International tennis competition

The Americas Zone was one of the three zones of the regional Davis Cup competition in 1994.

In the Americas Zone there were three different tiers, called groups, in which teams competed against each other to advance to the upper tier. Winners in Group III advanced to the Americas Zone Group II in 1995. All other teams remained in Group III.

== Participating nations ==
- Barbados
- Bolivia
- Costa Rica
- Dominican Republic
- Eastern Caribbean
- El Salvador
- Haiti
- Trinidad and Tobago

=== Draw ===
- Venue: St. Lucia Racquet Club, Gros Islet, Saint Lucia
- Date: 9–13 March

Group A

	HAI	ESA	CRC	BAR	RR; W–L	Match; W–L	Set; W–L	Standings
Haiti		2–1	2–1	3–0	3–0	7–2 (78%)	15–6 (71%)	1
El Salvador	1–2		3–0	3–0	2–1	7–2 (78%)	15–6 (71%)	2
Costa Rica	1–2	0–3		3–0	1–2	4–5 (44%)	9–13 (41%)	3
Barbados	0–3	0–3	0–3		0–3	0–9 (0%)	4–18 (18%)	4

Group B

	BOL	DOM	TRI	ECA	RR; W–L	Match; W–L	Set; W–L	Standings
Bolivia		2–1	2–1	2–1	3–0	6–3 (67%)	14–8 (64%)	1
Dominican Republic	1–2		2–1	2–1	2–1	5–4 (56%)	10–9 (53%)	2
Trinidad and Tobago	1–2	1–2		2–1	1–2	4–5 (44%)	10–12 (45%)	3
Eastern Caribbean	1–2	1–2	1–2		0–3	3–6 (33%)	8–13 (38%)	4

1st to 4th place play-offs

Semifinals
A1	Haiti	2
B2	Dominican Republic	1
A2	El Salvador	1
B1	Bolivia	2

Final
A1	Haiti	2
B1	Bolivia	1
3rd-4th play-off
B2	Dominican Republic	1
A2	El Salvador	2

5th to 8th place play-offs

5th-8th play-offs
A3	Costa Rica	3
B4	Eastern Caribbean	0
A4	Barbados	1
B3	Trinidad and Tobago	2

5th-6th play-off
A3	Costa Rica	2
B3	Trinidad and Tobago	1
7th-8th play-off
B4	Eastern Caribbean	3
A4	Barbados	0

=== Final standings ===
Rank	Team
1	Haiti
2	Bolivia
3	El Salvador
4	Dominican Republic
5	Costa Rica
6	Trinidad and Tobago
7	Eastern Caribbean
8	Barbados

- Haiti and Bolivia promoted to Group II in 1995.

== Round robin ==
=== Group A ===
==== Barbados vs. El Salvador ====
Barbados
0
St. Lucia Racquet Club, Gros Islet, Saint Lucia
9 March 1994

El Salvador
3

			1	2	3
1	(Barbados) (El Salvador)	Duane Lashley; Manuel Antonio Tejada Ruiz	2; 6	1; 6
2	(Barbados) (El Salvador)	Bernard Frost; Miguel Merz	4; 6	4; 6
3	(Barbados) (El Salvador)	Bernard Frost / Gordon Thomson; Miguel Ángel Campos / Allan López	3; 6	7^{7} 6^{5}	3; 6

==== Costa Rica vs. Haiti ====
Costa Rica
1
St. Lucia Racquet Club, Gros Islet, Saint Lucia
9 March 1994

Haiti
2

			1	2	3
1	(Costa Rica) (Haiti)	Fred Thome; Patrice Baker	6; 3	5; 7	6; 1
2	(Costa Rica) (Haiti)	Rafael Ávalos Brenes; Ronald Agénor	5; 7	1; 6
3	(Costa Rica) (Haiti)	Rafael Ávalos Brenes / Fabrizio Golfin Guevara; Ronald Agénor / Patrice Baker	2; 6	4; 6

==== Barbados vs. Haiti ====
Barbados
0
St. Lucia Racquet Club, Gros Islet, Saint Lucia
10 March 1994

Haiti
3

			1	2	3
1	(Barbados) (Haiti)	Desmond Whitehall; Patrice Baker	4; 6	3; 6
2	(Barbados) (Haiti)	Bernard Frost; Ronald Agénor	6; 3	3; 6	4; 6
3	(Barbados) (Haiti)	Bernard Frost / Gordon Thomson; Ronald Agénor / Patrice Baker	3; 6	3; 6

==== Costa Rica vs. El Salvador ====
Costa Rica
0
St. Lucia Racquet Club, Gros Islet, Saint Lucia
10 March 1994

El Salvador
3

			1	2	3
1	(Costa Rica) (El Salvador)	Fred Thome; Manuel Antonio Tejada Ruiz	4; 6	4; 6
2	(Costa Rica) (El Salvador)	Rafael Ávalos Brenes; Miguel Merz	5; 7	4; 6
3	(Costa Rica) (El Salvador)	Fabrizio Golfin Guevara / Fred Thome; Miguel Ángel Campos / Allan López	3; 6	7^{7} 6^{4}	4; 6

==== Barbados vs. Costa Rica ====
Barbados
0
St. Lucia Racquet Club, Gros Islet, Saint Lucia
11 March 1994

Costa Rica
3

			1	2	3
1	(Barbados) (Costa Rica)	Duane Lashley; Fabrizio Golfin Guevara	6; 3	2; 6	2; 6
2	(Barbados) (Costa Rica)	Bernard Frost; Rafael Ávalos Brenes	4; 6	7; 5	4; 6
3	(Barbados) (Costa Rica)	Gordon Thomson / Desmond Whitehall; Rafael Ávalos Brenes / Fred Thome	2; 6	3; 6

==== El Salvador vs. Haiti ====
El Salvador
1
St. Lucia Racquet Club, Gros Islet, Saint Lucia
11 March 1994

Haiti
2

			1	2	3
1	(El Salvador) (Haiti)	Manuel Antonio Tejada Ruiz; Patrice Baker	6; 1	6; 4
2	(El Salvador) (Haiti)	Miguel Merz; Ronald Agénor	3; 6	6; 4	6; 8
3	(El Salvador) (Haiti)	Miguel Ángel Campos / Allan López; Ronald Agénor / Patrice Baker	3; 6	3; 6

=== Group B ===
==== Bolivia vs. Eastern Caribbean ====
Bolivia
2
St. Lucia Racquet Club, Gros Islet, Saint Lucia
9 March 1994

Eastern Caribbean
1

			1	2	3
1	(Bolivia) (Eastern Caribbean)	José Medrano; Gavaskar Williams	7^{7} 6^{1}	6; 2
2	(Bolivia) (Eastern Caribbean)	Rodrigo Navarro; Vernon Lewis	3; 6	6; 4	1; 6
3	(Bolivia) (Eastern Caribbean)	José Medrano / Rodrigo Navarro; Vernon Lewis / Gavaskar Williams	1; 6	6; 4	6; 2

==== Dominican Republic vs. Trinidad and Tobago ====
Dominican Republic
2
St. Lucia Racquet Club, Gros Islet, Saint Lucia
9 March 1994

Trinidad and Tobago
1

			1	2	3
1	(Dominican Republic) (Trinidad and Tobago)	Rodrigo Vallejo; Orville Adams	3; 6	2; 6
2	(Dominican Republic) (Trinidad and Tobago)	Hiram Silfa; Christopher Mark	6; 1	6; 2
3	(Dominican Republic) (Trinidad and Tobago)	Hiram Silfa / Rodrigo Vallejo; Orville Adams / Shane Stone	4; 6	6; 2	6; 3

==== Bolivia vs. Trinidad and Tobago ====
Bolivia
2
St. Lucia Racquet Club, Gros Islet, Saint Lucia
10 March 1994

Trinidad and Tobago
1

			1	2	3
1	(Bolivia) (Trinidad and Tobago)	José Medrano; Orville Adams	6; 3	4; 6	6; 3
2	(Bolivia) (Trinidad and Tobago)	Rodrigo Navarro; Christopher Mark	6; 1	6; 3
3	(Bolivia) (Trinidad and Tobago)	José Medrano / Rodrigo Navarro; Orville Adams / Shane Stone	7^{8} 6^{6}	3; 6	4; 6

==== Dominican Republic vs. Eastern Caribbean ====
Dominican Republic
2
St. Lucia Racquet Club, Gros Islet, Saint Lucia
10 March 1994

Eastern Caribbean
1

			1	2	3
1	(Dominican Republic) (Eastern Caribbean)	Rodrigo Vallejo; Gavaskar Williams	6^{6} 7^{8}	6^{3} 7^{7}
2	(Dominican Republic) (Eastern Caribbean)	Hiram Silfa; Vernon Lewis	6; 3	6; 4
3	(Dominican Republic) (Eastern Caribbean)	Hiram Silfa / Rodrigo Vallejo; Richard Hughes / Gavaskar Williams	7^{7} 6^{5}	6; 5

==== Bolivia vs. Dominican Republic ====
Bolivia
2
St. Lucia Racquet Club, Gros Islet, Saint Lucia
11 March 1994

Dominican Republic
1

			1	2	3
1	(Bolivia) (Dominican Republic)	José Medrano; Rodrigo Vallejo	7; 5	6; 4
2	(Bolivia) (Dominican Republic)	Rodrigo Navarro; Hiram Silfa	3; 6	0; 6
3	(Bolivia) (Dominican Republic)	José Medrano / Rodrigo Navarro; Hiram Silfa / Rodrigo Vallejo	6; 3	6; 4

==== Eastern Caribbean vs. Trinidad and Tobago ====
Eastern Caribbean
1
St. Lucia Racquet Club, Gros Islet, Saint Lucia
11 March 1994

Trinidad and Tobago
2

			1	2	3
1	(Eastern Caribbean) (Trinidad and Tobago)	Glynn James; Shane Stone	1; 6	5; 7
2	(Eastern Caribbean) (Trinidad and Tobago)	Vernon Lewis; Orville Adams	6; 3	6^{3} 7^{7}	4; 6
3	(Eastern Caribbean) (Trinidad and Tobago)	Richard Hughes / Glynn James; Brian Khan / Christopher Mark	6; 3	6; 4

== 1st to 4th place play-offs ==
=== Semifinals ===
==== Dominican Republic vs. Haiti ====
Dominican Republic
1
St. Lucia Racquet Club, Gros Islet, Saint Lucia
12 March 1994

Haiti
2

			1	2	3
1	(Dominican Republic) (Haiti)	Rodrigo Vallejo; Patrice Baker	5; 7	7; 5	6; 4
2	(Dominican Republic) (Haiti)	Hiram Silfa; Ronald Agénor	5; 7	2; 6
3	(Dominican Republic) (Haiti)	Hiram Silfa / Rodrigo Vallejo; Ronald Agénor / Patrice Baker	3; 6	4; 6

==== Bolivia vs. El Salvador ====
Bolivia
2
St. Lucia Racquet Club, Gros Islet, Saint Lucia
12 March 1994

El Salvador
1

			1	2	3
1	(Bolivia) (El Salvador)	José Medrano; Manuel Antonio Tejada Ruiz	6; 0	5; 7	10; 8
2	(Bolivia) (El Salvador)	Rodrigo Navarro; Miguel Merz	5; 7	0; 6
3	(Bolivia) (El Salvador)	José Medrano / Rodrigo Navarro; Miguel Merz / Manuel Antonio Tejada Ruiz	7^{9} 6^{7}	7^{7} 6^{2}

=== Final ===
==== Bolivia vs. Haiti ====
Bolivia
1
St. Lucia Racquet Club, Gros Islet, Saint Lucia
13 March 1994

Haiti
2

			1	2	3
1	(Bolivia) (Haiti)	José Medrano; Richard Roy	6; 1	6; 4
2	(Bolivia) (Haiti)	Rodrigo Navarro; Ronald Agénor	1; 6	1; 6
3	(Bolivia) (Haiti)	José Medrano / Rodrigo Navarro; Ronald Agénor / Patrice Baker	6; 3	3; 6	4; 6

=== 3rd to 4th play-off ===
==== Dominican Republic vs. El Salvador ====
Dominican Republic
1
St. Lucia Racquet Club, Gros Islet, Saint Lucia
13 March 1994

El Salvador
2

			1	2	3
1	(Dominican Republic) (El Salvador)	Rodrigo Vallejo; Manuel Antonio Tejada Ruiz	7; 5	6^{7} 7^{9}	8; 10
2	(Dominican Republic) (El Salvador)	Hiram Silfa; Miguel Merz	3; 6	2; 6
3	(Dominican Republic) (El Salvador)	Sixto Camacho / Hiram Silfa; Miguel Ángel Campos / Allan López	6; 3	6; 3

== 5th to 8th place play-offs ==
=== 5th to 8th play-offs ===
==== Costa Rica vs. Eastern Caribbean ====
Costa Rica
3
St. Lucia Racquet Club, Gros Islet, Saint Lucia
12 March 1994

Eastern Caribbean
0

			1	2	3
1	(Costa Rica) (Eastern Caribbean)	Fred Thome; Richard Hughes	6; 1	6; 3
2	(Costa Rica) (Eastern Caribbean)	Rafael Ávalos Brenes; Glynn James	6; 1	6; 4
3	(Costa Rica) (Eastern Caribbean)	Fabrizio Golfin Guevara / Fred Thome; Richard Hughes / Glynn James	6; 3	6; 4

==== Barbados vs. Trinidad and Tobago ====
Barbados
1
St. Lucia Racquet Club, Gros Islet, Saint Lucia
12 March 1994

Trinidad and Tobago
2

			1	2	3
1	(Barbados) (Trinidad and Tobago)	Desmond Whitehall; Shane Stone	5; 7	0; 6
2	(Barbados) (Trinidad and Tobago)	Bernard Frost; Orville Adams	6; 4	4; 6	2; 6
3	(Barbados) (Trinidad and Tobago)	Duane Lashley / Gordon Thomson; Brian Khan / Christopher Mark	6; 4	6; 0

=== 5th to 6th play-offs ===
==== Costa Rica vs. Trinidad and Tobago ====
Costa Rica
2
St. Lucia Racquet Club, Gros Islet, Saint Lucia
13 March 1994

Trinidad and Tobago
1

			1	2	3
1	(Costa Rica) (Trinidad and Tobago)	Fred Thome; Shane Stone	1; 6	2; 6
2	(Costa Rica) (Trinidad and Tobago)	Rafael Ávalos Brenes; Orville Adams	7; 5	6; 2
3	(Costa Rica) (Trinidad and Tobago)	Rafael Ávalos Brenes / Fabrizio Golfin Guevara; Orville Adams / Shane Stone	6; 1	6; 4

=== 7th to 8th play-offs ===
==== Barbados vs. Eastern Caribbean ====
Barbados
0
St. Lucia Racquet Club, Gros Islet, Saint Lucia
13 March 1994

Eastern Caribbean
3

			1	2	3
1	(Barbados) (Eastern Caribbean)	Duane Lashley; Richard Hughes	1; 6	3; 6
2	(Barbados) (Eastern Caribbean)	Bernard Frost; Vernon Lewis	4; 6	5; 7
3	(Barbados) (Eastern Caribbean)	Bernard Frost / Gordon Thomson; Richard Hughes / Glynn James	4; 6	6^{5} 7^{7}
