= 2000 Davis Cup Americas Zone Group II =

International tennis competition

The Americas Zone was one of the three zones of the regional Davis Cup competition in 2000.

In the Americas Zone there were four different tiers, called groups, in which teams compete against each other to advance to the upper tier. Winners in Group II advanced to the Americas Zone Group I. Teams who lost their respective ties competed in the relegation play-offs, with winning teams remaining in Group II, whereas teams who lost their play-offs were relegated to the Americas Zone Group III in 2001.

== Participating nations ==
- Costa Rica
- Cuba
- El Salvador
- Guatemala
- Mexico
- Paraguay
- Uruguay
- Venezuela

=== Draw ===
Relegation Play-offs
Montevideo, Uruguay (clay)
Uruguay	4
El Salvador	1
San Rafael de Escazú, Costa Rica (hard)
Cuba	2
Costa Rica	3

First Round
Caracas, Venezuela (hard)
Venezuela	5
Uruguay	0
San Salvador, El Salvador (clay)
El Salvador	0
Paraguay	5
Guatemala City, Guatemala (hard)
Guatemala	4
Cuba	1
San Rafael de Escazú, Costa Rica (hard)
Costa Rica	1
Mexico	4

Second Round
Caracas, Venezuela (hard)
Venezuela	5
Paraguay	0
Guatemala City, Guatemala (hard)
Guatemala	0
Mexico	5

Third Round
Mexico City, Mexico (hard)
Venezuela	0
Mexico	5

- El Salvador and Cuba relegated to Group III in 2001.
- Mexico promoted to Group I in 2001.

== First round ==
=== Venezuela vs. Uruguay ===
Venezuela
5
National Centre, Caracas, Venezuela
4–6 February 2000
Hard

Uruguay
0

			1	2	3	4	5
1	(Venezuela) (Uruguay)	Maurice Ruah; Federico Dondo	7^{7} 6^{5}	6; 4	6; 3
2	(Venezuela) (Uruguay)	Jimy Szymanski; Alejandro Olivera	7^{7} 6^{3}	6; 4	6; 4
3	(Venezuela) (Uruguay)	José de Armas / Maurice Ruah; Federico Dondo / Alejandro Olivera	1; 6	6; 4	4; 6	6; 3	6; 4
4	(Venezuela) (Uruguay)	José de Armas; Alberto Brause	6; 4	7^{7} 6^{5}
5	(Venezuela) (Uruguay)	Yohny Romero; Alejandro Olivera	6; 3	6; 0

=== El Salvador vs. Paraguay ===
El Salvador
0
Maya Country Club, San Salvador, El Salvador
4–6 February 2000
Clay

Paraguay
5

			1	2	3	4	5
1	(El Salvador) (Paraguay)	Manuel Antonio Tejada Ruiz; Francisco Rodríguez	6^{1} 7^{7}	5; 7	3; 6
2	(El Salvador) (Paraguay)	Yari Bernardo; Paulo Carvallo	7; 5	6^{6} 7^{8}	3; 6	1; 6
3	(El Salvador) (Paraguay)	Yari Bernardo / Miguel Merz; Paulo Carvallo / Francisco Rodríguez	4; 6	4; 6	6^{6} 7^{8}
4	(El Salvador) (Paraguay)	Manuel Antonio Tejada Ruiz; Paulo Carvallo	6^{4} 7^{7}	3; 6
5	(El Salvador) (Paraguay)	José Baires; Francisco Rodríguez	3; 6	1; 6

=== Guatemala vs. Cuba ===
Guatemala
4
National Centre, Guatemala City, Guatemala
4–6 February 2000
Hard

Cuba
1

			1	2	3	4	5
1	(Guatemala) (Cuba)	Jacobo Chávez; Lázaro Navarro-Batles	7; 5	4; 6	4; 6	6; 3	6; 4
2	(Guatemala) (Cuba)	Luis Pérez Chete; Sandor Martínez Breijo	6; 4	6; 2	6; 2
3	(Guatemala) (Cuba)	Daniel Chávez Morales / Luis Pérez Chete; Sandor Martínez Breijo / Lázaro Navarro-Batles	7^{7} 6^{4}	6; 4	6; 3
4	(Guatemala) (Cuba)	Luis Pérez Chete; Kerlin León Zamora	3; 6	6; 3	6; 3
5	(Guatemala) (Cuba)	Jorge Tejada; Sandor Martínez Breijo	3; 6	5; 7

=== Costa Rica vs. Mexico ===
Costa Rica
1
Costa Rica Country Club, San Rafael de Escazú, Costa Rica
4–6 February 2000
Hard

Mexico
4

			1	2	3	4	5
1	(Costa Rica) (Mexico)	Rafael Ávalos Brenes; Marco Osorio	2; 6	6^{2} 7^{7}	7^{10} 6^{8}	6; 1	6; 4
2	(Costa Rica) (Mexico)	Luis Diego Núñez; Alejandro Hernández	0; 6	2; 6	0; 6
3	(Costa Rica) (Mexico)	Alejandro Madrigal Alpizar / Felipe Montenegro; Óscar Ortiz / David Roditi	1; 6	2; 6	0; 6
4	(Costa Rica) (Mexico)	Rafael Ávalos Brenes; Alejandro Hernández	3; 6	2; 6	6^{5} 7^{7}
5	(Costa Rica) (Mexico)	Luis Diego Núñez; Marco Osorio	0; 6	1; 6

== Second round ==
=== Venezuela vs. Paraguay ===
Venezuela
5
National Centre, Caracas, Venezuela
7–9 April 2000
Hard

Paraguay
0

			1	2	3	4	5
1	(Venezuela) (Paraguay)	Jimy Szymanski; Emilio Báez Brítez	6; 2	6; 1	6; 2
2	(Venezuela) (Paraguay)	José de Armas; Paulo Carvallo	7^{7} 6^{5}	7; 5	6; 3
3	(Venezuela) (Paraguay)	José de Armas / Jimy Szymanski; Emilio Báez Brítez / Paulo Carvallo	6; 2	6; 4	6; 2
4	(Venezuela) (Paraguay)	Yohny Romero; Paulo Carvallo	6; 3	2; 6	6; 3
5	(Venezuela) (Paraguay)	Óscar Posada; Emilio Báez Brítez	6; 1	6; 4

=== Guatemala vs. Mexico ===
Guatemala
0
National Centre, Guatemala City, Guatemala
7–9 April 2000
Hard

Mexico
5

			1	2	3	4	5
1	(Guatemala) (Mexico)	Luis Pérez Chete; Alejandro Hernández	2; 6	3; 6	7; 5	2; 6
2	(Guatemala) (Mexico)	Jacobo Chávez; Marco Osorio	5; 7	3; 6	4; 6
3	(Guatemala) (Mexico)	Daniel Chávez Morales / Jacobo Chávez; Óscar Ortiz / David Roditi	3; 6	5; 7	2; 6
4	(Guatemala) (Mexico)	Daniel Chávez Morales; Alejandro Hernández	3; 6	4; 6
5	(Guatemala) (Mexico)	Alexander Vásquez; Marco Osorio	2; 6	3; 6

== Relegation play-offs ==
=== Uruguay vs. El Salvador ===
Uruguay
4
Montevideo Tennis Club, Montevideo, Uruguay
7–9 April 2000
Clay

El Salvador
1

			1	2	3	4	5
1	(Uruguay) (El Salvador)	Alberto Brause; Manuel Antonio Tejada Ruiz	6; 0	6; 4	6; 0
2	(Uruguay) (El Salvador)	Federico Dondo; Yari Bernardo	6; 1	6; 4	6; 0
3	(Uruguay) (El Salvador)	Federico Dondo / Alejandro Olivera; Miguel Merz / Augusto Sanabria	5; 7	6; 2	7^{7} 6^{5}	3; 6	5; 7
4	(Uruguay) (El Salvador)	Federico Dondo; Manuel Antonio Tejada Ruiz	6; 3	6; 2	6; 2
5	(Uruguay) (El Salvador)	Marcel Felder; Augusto Sanabria	6; 2	6; 1

=== Costa Rica vs. Cuba ===
Costa Rica
3
Costa Rica Country Club, San Rafael de Escazú, Costa Rica
7–9 April 2000
Hard

Cuba
2

			1	2	3	4	5
1	(Costa Rica) (Cuba)	Rafael Ávalos Brenes; Lázaro Navarro-Batles	4; 6	4; 6	4; 6
2	(Costa Rica) (Cuba)	Juan Antonio Marín; Kerlin León Zamora	6; 2	6; 0	6; 2
3	(Costa Rica) (Cuba)	Federico Camacho / Juan Antonio Marín; Sandor Martínez Breijo / Lázaro Navarro-Batles	7^{7} 6^{4}	6; 4	5; 7	5; 7	6; 3
4	(Costa Rica) (Cuba)	Juan Antonio Marín; Lázaro Navarro-Batles	6; 4	4; 6	6; 1	4; 6	6; 4
5	(Costa Rica) (Cuba)	Rafael Ávalos Brenes; Ricardo Chile Fonte	4; 6	0; 6

== Third round ==
=== Mexico vs. Venezuela ===
Mexico
5
Casablanca Club, Mexico City, Mexico
21–23 July 2000
Hard

Venezuela
0

			1	2	3	4	5
1	(Mexico) (Venezuela)	Alejandro Hernández; José de Armas	6; 2	6; 1	6; 4
2	(Mexico) (Venezuela)	Mariano Sánchez; Jimy Szymanski	7^{8} 6^{6}	6; 1	6; 4
3	(Mexico) (Venezuela)	Alejandro Hernández / David Roditi; José de Armas / Jimy Szymanski	7^{7} 6^{4}	2; 6	6; 2	7^{7} 6^{4}
4	(Mexico) (Venezuela)	Alejandro Hernández; Jimy Szymanski	7^{7} 6^{2}	6; 4
5	(Mexico) (Venezuela)	Mariano Sánchez; José de Armas	6; 0	3; 6	6; 2
