= 1995 Davis Cup Americas Zone Group II =

Davis Cup Americas Zone

The Americas Zone was one of the three zones of the regional Davis Cup competition in 1995.

In the Americas Zone there were three different tiers, called groups, in which teams compete against each other to advance to the upper tier. Winners in Group II advanced to the Americas Zone Group I. Teams who lost their respective ties competed in the relegation play-offs, with winning teams remaining in Group II, whereas teams who lost their play-offs were relegated to the Americas Zone Group III in 1996.

== Participating nations ==
- Bolivia
- Canada
- Colombia
- Cuba
- Ecuador
- Guatemala
- Haiti
- Paraguay

=== Draw ===
Relegation Play-offs
Cochabamba, Bolivia (clay)
Cuba	5
Bolivia	0
Port-au-Prince, Haiti (clay)
Paraguay	3
Haiti	2

First Round
Guayaquil, Ecuador (clay)
Cuba	2
Ecuador	3
Guatemala City, Guatemala (hard)
Guatemala	4
Bolivia	1
Asunción, Paraguay (clay)
Paraguay	2
Colombia	3
Port-au-Prince, Haiti (clay)
Haiti	2
Canada	3

Second Round
Guayaquil, Ecuador (clay)
Ecuador	5
Guatemala	0
Kelowna, Canada (indoor carpet)
Colombia	0
Canada	5

Third Round
Victoria, Canada (indoor carpet)
Ecuador	2
Canada	3

- Bolivia and Haiti relegated to Group III in 1996.
- Canada promoted to Group I in 1996.

== First round ==
=== Ecuador vs. Cuba ===
Ecuador
3
Guayaquil Tennis Club, Guayaquil, Ecuador
3–5 February 1995
Clay

Cuba
2

			1	2	3	4	5
1	(Ecuador) (Cuba)	Luis Morejón; Armando Pérez	6; 2	6; 2	2; 6	4; 6	2; 6
2	(Ecuador) (Cuba)	Nicolás Lapentti; Juan Pino	6; 3	6; 3	4; 6	4; 6	6; 4
3	(Ecuador) (Cuba)	Nicolás Lapentti / Luis Morejón; Lázaro Navarro-Batles / Juan Pino	7^{7} 6^{5}	7^{7} 6^{0}	6; 4
4	(Ecuador) (Cuba)	Luis Morejón; Juan Pino	6; 3	4; 6	6; 3	2; 6	1; 6
5	(Ecuador) (Cuba)	Nicolás Lapentti; Armando Pérez	6; 1	6; 1	6; 2

=== Guatemala vs. Bolivia ===
Guatemala
4
Ciudad Deportiva, Guatemala City, Guatemala
3–5 February 1995
Hard

Bolivia
1

			1	2	3	4	5
1	(Guatemala) (Bolivia)	Luis Pérez Chete; José Medrano	6; 4	7^{7} 6^{5}	7; 5
2	(Guatemala) (Bolivia)	Fernando Samayoa; Carlos Martín Navarro Vergara	6; 3	7^{7} 6^{1}	6; 2
3	(Guatemala) (Bolivia)	Jorge Tejada / Luis Valencia; José Medrano / Pablo Ugarte	4; 6	6^{5} 7^{7}	6; 4	7^{7} 6^{4}	6; 4
4	(Guatemala) (Bolivia)	Fernando Samayoa; José Medrano	3; 6	4; 6
5	(Guatemala) (Bolivia)	Luis Pérez Chete; Carlos Martín Navarro Vergara	6; 2	6; 4

=== Paraguay vs. Colombia ===
Paraguay
2
Yacht y Golf Club Paraguayo, Asunción, Paraguay
3–5 February 1995
Clay

Colombia
3

			1	2	3	4	5
1	(Paraguay) (Colombia)	Ramón Delgado; Mauricio Hadad	7^{14} 6^{12}	3; 6	6; 3	6^{4} 7^{7}	4; 6
2	(Paraguay) (Colombia)	Ricardo Mena; Mario Rincón	6; 2	6; 4	6; 2
3	(Paraguay) (Colombia)	Rubén Alvarenga / Ricardo Mena; Mauricio Hadad / Miguel Tobón	4; 6	1; 6	2; 6
4	(Paraguay) (Colombia)	Ricardo Mena; Mauricio Hadad	2; 6	6; 4	5; 7	3; 6
5	(Paraguay) (Colombia)	Ramón Delgado; Mario Rincón	6; 4	6; 4

=== Haiti vs. Canada ===
Haiti
2
Cercle Bellevue, Port-au-Prince, Haiti
3–5 February 1995
Clay

Canada
3

			1	2	3	4	5
1	(Haiti) (Canada)	Bertrand Madsen; Sébastien Lareau	4; 6	7^{11} 6^{9}	3; 6	6; 3	6; 4
2	(Haiti) (Canada)	Ronald Agénor; Andrew Sznajder	4; 6	3; 6	6; 3	4; 6
3	(Haiti) (Canada)	Ronald Agénor / Patrice Baker; Grant Connell / Daniel Nestor	3; 6	3; 6	1; 6
4	(Haiti) (Canada)	Ronald Agénor; Sébastien Lareau	6; 2	5; 7	6; 3	6; 4
5	(Haiti) (Canada)	Bertrand Madsen; Andrew Sznajder	6; 3	5; 7	3; 6	6; 2	5; 7

== Second round ==
=== Ecuador vs. Guatemala ===
Ecuador
5
Guayaquil Tennis Club, Guayaquil, Ecuador
31 March–2 April 1995
Clay

Guatemala
0

			1	2	3	4	5
1	(Ecuador) (Guatemala)	Andrés Gómez; Luis Pérez Chete	6; 2	7^{11} 6^{9}	6; 4
2	(Ecuador) (Guatemala)	Nicolás Lapentti; Alexander Lehnhoff	6; 1	6; 2	6; 2
3	(Ecuador) (Guatemala)	Pablo Campana / Nicolás Lapentti; Jorge Tejada / Luis Valencia	6; 3	6; 2	6; 0
4	(Ecuador) (Guatemala)	Nicolás Lapentti; Luis Pérez Chete	6; 1	6; 2
5	(Ecuador) (Guatemala)	Andrés Gómez; Alexander Lehnhoff	6; 3	6; 0

=== Canada vs. Colombia ===
Canada
5
Okanagan University College, Kelowna, Canada
31 March–2 April 1995
Carpet (indoors)

Colombia
0

			1	2	3	4	5
1	(Canada) (Colombia)	Sébastien Lareau; Miguel Tobón	6^{2} 7^{7}	6; 0	6^{5} 7^{7}	6; 2	6; 2
2	(Canada) (Colombia)	Grant Connell; Mauricio Hadad	6; 3	7^{7} 6^{5}	6; 4
3	(Canada) (Colombia)	Grant Connell / Daniel Nestor; Mauricio Hadad / Miguel Tobón	6; 3	6; 1	7^{7} 6^{5}
4	(Canada) (Colombia)	Sébastien Lareau; Rodolfo Varela	7; 5	6; 0
5	(Canada) (Colombia)	Albert Chang; Carlos Drada	6; 2	6; 3

== Relegation play-offs ==
=== Bolivia vs. Cuba ===
Bolivia
0
Cochabamba Tennis Centre, Cochabamba, Bolivia
31 March–2 April 1995
Clay

Cuba
5

			1	2	3	4	5
1	(Bolivia) (Cuba)	Carlos Martín Navarro Vergara; Juan Pino	7^{7} 6^{1}	3; 6	2; 6	2; 6
2	(Bolivia) (Cuba)	José Medrano; Armando Pérez	7^{7} 6^{3}	4; 6	2; 6	6; 1	3; 6
3	(Bolivia) (Cuba)	José Medrano / Pablo Ugarte; Armando Pérez / Juan Pino	4; 6	6^{3} 7^{7}	3; 6
4	(Bolivia) (Cuba)	José Medrano; Alexander Tabares	4; 6	5; 7
5	(Bolivia) (Cuba)	Carlos Martín Navarro Vergara; Armando Pérez	4; 6	7; 5	2; 6

=== Haiti vs. Paraguay ===
Haiti
2
Cercle Bellevue, Port-au-Prince, Haiti
31 March–2 April 1995
Clay

Paraguay
3

			1	2	3	4	5
1	(Haiti) (Paraguay)	Bertrand Madsen; Ricardo Mena	5; 7	6; 4	6; 4	7^{7} 6^{5}
2	(Haiti) (Paraguay)	Ronald Agénor; Ramón Delgado	1; 6	7^{7} 6^{0}	6^{4} 7^{7}	7; 5	7; 9
3	(Haiti) (Paraguay)	Patrice Baker / Bertrand Madsen; Ramón Delgado / Ricardo Mena	4; 6	4; 6	7^{7} 6^{4}	7; 5	4; 6
4	(Haiti) (Paraguay)	Ronald Agénor; Ricardo Mena	6; 1	4; 6	6; 0	6; 1
5	(Haiti) (Paraguay)	Bertrand Madsen; Ramón Delgado	5; 7	6; 4	6^{5} 7^{7}	1; 6

== Third round ==
=== Canada vs. Ecuador ===
Canada
3
Victoria Memorial Arena, Victoria, Canada
22–24 September 1995
Carpet (indoors)

Ecuador
2

			1	2	3	4	5
1	(Canada) (Ecuador)	Daniel Nestor; Nicolás Lapentti	7; 5	6; 2	3; 6	4; 6	8; 6
2	(Canada) (Ecuador)	Sébastien Lareau; Pablo Campana	6; 1	6^{4} 7^{7}	4; 6	2; 6
3	(Canada) (Ecuador)	Grant Connell / Daniel Nestor; Andrés Gómez / Nicolás Lapentti	6; 1	7; 5	6^{5} 7^{7}	6; 3
4	(Canada) (Ecuador)	Sébastien Lareau; Nicolás Lapentti	6; 4	6; 4	6; 4
5	(Canada) (Ecuador)	Daniel Nestor; Pablo Campana	7^{8} 6^{6}					retired
