= 2004 Davis Cup Americas Zone Group IV =

International tennis competition

The Americas Zone was one of the three zones of the regional Davis Cup competition in 2004.

In the Americas Zone there were four different tiers, called groups, in which teams competed against each other to advance to the upper tier. The six teams in Group IV played in a single Round-robin tournament . The top two teams were promoted to the Americas Zone Group III in 2005. All other teams remained in Group IV.

== Draw ==
- Venue: Costa Rica Country Club, Escazú, Costa Rica (outdoor hard)
- Date: 7 - 11 April

Team	Pld	W	L	MF	MA
Guatemala	5	5	0	14	1
Saint Lucia	5	4	1	10	5
Barbados	5	2	3	8	7
Costa Rica	5	2	3	7	8
Bermuda	5	1	4	3	12
Eastern Caribbean	5	1	4	3	12

Guatemala and St.Lucia promoted to Group III for 2005.

== Results ==
=== Costa Rica vs. Saint Lucia ===
Costa Rica
1
Costa Rica Country Club, Escazú, Costa Rica
7 April 2004

Saint Lucia
2

			1	2	3
1	(Costa Rica) (Saint Lucia)	Federico Chavarría; Kane Easter	6^{0} 7^{7}	7; 5	4; 0	retired
2	(Costa Rica) (Saint Lucia)	Juan Carlos González; Vernon Lewis	1; 6	2; 6
3	(Costa Rica) (Saint Lucia)	Federico Chavarría / Marcos Salazar; Vernon Lewis / Alberton Richelieu	4; 6	3; 6

=== Bermuda vs. Barbados ===
Bermuda
1
Costa Rica Country Club, Escazú, Costa Rica
7 April 2004

Barbados
2

			1	2	3
1	(Bermuda) (Barbados)	Jovan Whitter; Russell Moseley	7; 5	3; 6	4; 6
2	(Bermuda) (Barbados)	James Collieson; Duane Williams	6; 1	7; 5
3	(Bermuda) (Barbados)	Jenson Bascome / James Collieson; Russell Moseley / Duane Williams	6; 4	6^{3} 7^{7}	2; 6

=== Eastern Caribbean vs. Guatemala ===
Eastern Caribbean
0
Costa Rica Country Club, Escazú, Costa Rica
7 April 2004

Guatemala
3

			1	2	3
1	(Eastern Caribbean) (Guatemala)	Dexter Christian; Cristian Paiz	1; 6	6; 2	1; 6
2	(Eastern Caribbean) (Guatemala)	Glynn James; Jacobo Chávez	0; 6	1; 6
3	(Eastern Caribbean) (Guatemala)	Hayden Ashton / Corey Huggins; Daniel Chávez / Luis Pérez Chete	1; 6	3; 6

=== Costa Rica vs. Bermuda ===
Costa Rica
3
Costa Rica Country Club, Escazú, Costa Rica
8 April 2004

Bermuda
0

			1	2	3
1	(Costa Rica) (Bermuda)	Federico Chavarría; Gavin Manders	6; 2	6; 3
2	(Costa Rica) (Bermuda)	Juan Carlos González; James Collieson	6; 3	1; 6	6; 4
3	(Costa Rica) (Bermuda)	Ignaci Roca / Marcos Salazar; Gavin Manders / Jovan Whitter	7; 5	7; 5

=== Barbados vs. Eastern Caribbean ===
Barbados
1
Costa Rica Country Club, Escazú, Costa Rica
8 April 2004

Eastern Caribbean
2

			1	2	3
1	(Barbados) (Eastern Caribbean)	Ryan Moseley; Dexter Christian	6; 4	6; 3
2	(Barbados) (Eastern Caribbean)	Duane Williams; Glynn James	1; 6	1; 6
3	(Barbados) (Eastern Caribbean)	Russell Moseley / Ryan Moseley; Hayden Ashton / Glynn James	2; 6	4; 6

=== Guatemala vs. Saint Lucia ===
Guatemala
3
Costa Rica Country Club, Escazú, Costa Rica
8 April 2004

Saint Lucia
0

			1	2	3
1	(Guatemala) (Saint Lucia)	Cristian Paiz; Alberton Richelieu	7; 5	7; 5
2	(Guatemala) (Saint Lucia)	Jacobo Chávez; Vernon Lewis	6; 0	6; 4
3	(Guatemala) (Saint Lucia)	Daniel Chávez / Luis Pérez Chete; Kane Easter / Alberton Richelieu	6; 1	6; 1

=== Costa Rica vs. Eastern Caribbean ===
Costa Rica
3
Costa Rica Country Club, Escazú, Costa Rica
9 April 2004

Eastern Caribbean
0

			1	2	3
1	(Costa Rica) (Eastern Caribbean)	Federico Chavarría; Corey Huggins	6; 4	6; 3
2	(Costa Rica) (Eastern Caribbean)	Marcos Salazar; Glynn James	6; 1	6; 4
3	(Costa Rica) (Eastern Caribbean)	Ignaci Roca / Marcos Salazar; Hayden Ashton / Corey Huggins	6; 4	1; 0		retired

=== Bermuda vs. Saint Lucia ===
Bermuda
0
Costa Rica Country Club, Escazú, Costa Rica
9 April 2004

Saint Lucia
3

			1	2	3
1	(Bermuda) (Saint Lucia)	Jenson Bascome; Kane Easter	2; 6	2; 6
2	(Bermuda) (Saint Lucia)	James Collieson; Vernon Lewis	4; 6	2; 6
3	(Bermuda) (Saint Lucia)	Gavin Manders / Jovan Whitter; Kane Easter / Alberton Richelieu	2; 6	1; 6

=== Barbados vs. Guatemala ===
Barbados
1
Costa Rica Country Club, Escazú, Costa Rica
9 April 2004

Guatemala
2

			1	2	3
1	(Barbados) (Guatemala)	Ryan Moseley; Cristian Paiz	3; 6	3; 6
2	(Barbados) (Guatemala)	Russell Moseley; Jacobo Chávez	6; 2	6; 1
3	(Barbados) (Guatemala)	Russell Moseley / Duane Williams; Daniel Chávez / Luis Pérez Chete	4; 6	4; 6

=== Costa Rica vs. Barbados ===
Costa Rica
0
Costa Rica Country Club, Escazú, Costa Rica
10 April 2004

Barbados
3

			1	2	3
1	(Costa Rica) (Barbados)	Federico Chavarría; Damien Applewhaite	6; 2	0; 6	3; 6
2	(Costa Rica) (Barbados)	Marcos Salazar; Russell Moseley	4; 6	5; 7
3	(Costa Rica) (Barbados)	Federico Chavarría / Ignaci Roca; Ryan Moseley / Duane Williams	6^{3} 7^{7}	4; 6

=== Bermuda vs. Guatemala ===
Bermuda
0
Costa Rica Country Club, Escazú, Costa Rica
10 April 2004

Guatemala
3

			1	2	3
1	(Bermuda) (Guatemala)	Jovan Whitter; Luis Pérez Chete	0; 6	1; 6
2	(Bermuda) (Guatemala)	James Collieson; Cristian Paiz	3; 6	3; 6
3	(Bermuda) (Guatemala)	Gavin Manders / Jovan Whitter; Jacobo Chávez / Cristian Paiz	2; 6	1; 6

=== Eastern Caribbean vs. Saint Lucia ===
Eastern Caribbean
0
Costa Rica Country Club, Escazú, Costa Rica
10 April 2004

Saint Lucia
3

			1	2	3
1	(Eastern Caribbean) (Saint Lucia)	Dexter Christian; Kane Easter	2; 6	0; 6
2	(Eastern Caribbean) (Saint Lucia)	Glynn James; Vernon Lewis	1; 6	3; 6
3	(Eastern Caribbean) (Saint Lucia)	Dexter Christian / Corey Huggins; Trevor Hunte / Alberton Richelieu	2; 6	0; 6

=== Costa Rica vs. Guatemala ===
Costa Rica
0
Costa Rica Country Club, Escazú, Costa Rica
11 April 2004

Guatemala
3

			1	2	3
1	(Costa Rica) (Guatemala)	Federico Chavarría; Luis Pérez Chete	6; 3	1; 6	5; 7
2	(Costa Rica) (Guatemala)	Juan Carlos González; Cristian Paiz	3; 6	1; 6
3	(Costa Rica) (Guatemala)	Ignaci Roca / Marcos Salazar; Jacobo Chávez / Luis Pérez Chete	2; 6	2; 6

=== Bermuda vs. Eastern Caribbean ===
Bermuda
2
Costa Rica Country Club, Escazú, Costa Rica
11 April 2004

Eastern Caribbean
1

			1	2	3
1	(Bermuda) (Eastern Caribbean)	Gavin Manders; Hayden Ashton	6; 0	7^{7} 6^{3}
2	(Bermuda) (Eastern Caribbean)	James Collieson; Glynn James	5; 7	6; 1	4; 6
3	(Bermuda) (Eastern Caribbean)	James Collieson / Gavin Manders; Hayden Ashton / Glynn James	4; 1			retired

=== Barbados vs. Saint Lucia ===
Barbados
1
Costa Rica Country Club, Escazú, Costa Rica
11 April 2004

Saint Lucia
2

			1	2	3
1	(Barbados) (Saint Lucia)	Russell Moseley; Kane Easter	6; 1	6; 2
2	(Barbados) (Saint Lucia)	Duane Williams; Vernon Lewis	2; 6	0; 6
3	(Barbados) (Saint Lucia)	Russell Moseley / Duane Williams; Kane Easter / Vernon Lewis	2; 6	2; 6
