= 1996 Davis Cup Americas Zone Group II =

International tennis competition

The Americas Zone was one of the three zones of the regional Davis Cup competition in 1996.

In the Americas Zone there were three different tiers, called groups, in which teams compete against each other to advance to the upper tier. Winners in Group II advanced to the Americas Zone Group I. Teams who lost their respective ties competed in the relegation play-offs, with winning teams remaining in Group II, whereas teams who lost their play-offs were relegated to the Americas Zone Group III in 1997.

== Participating nations ==
- Barbados
- Colombia
- Cuba
- Ecuador
- Guatemala
- Paraguay
- Puerto Rico
- Uruguay

=== Draw ===
Relegation Play-offs
Guatemala City, Guatemala (hard)
Guatemala | 1
Puerto Rico | 4
Asunción, Paraguay (clay)
Paraguay | 5
Barbados | 0

First Round
Montevideo, Uruguay (clay)
Uruguay | 5
Guatemala | 0
Bogotá, Colombia (clay)
Puerto Rico | 0
Colombia | 5
Havana, Cuba (hard)
Cuba | 3
Paraguay | 2
Guayaquil, Ecuador (clay)
Barbados | 0
Ecuador | 5

Second Round
Montevideo, Uruguay (clay)
Uruguay | 3
Colombia | 2
Havana, Cuba (hard)
Cuba | 0
Ecuador | 3

Third Round
Guayaquil, Ecuador (clay)
Uruguay | 1
Ecuador | 4

- Guatemala and Barbados relegated to Group III in 1997.
- Ecuador promoted to Group I in 1997.

== First round ==
=== Uruguay vs. Guatemala ===
Uruguay
5
Carrasco Lawn Tennis Club, Montevideo, Uruguay
9–11 February 1996
Clay

Guatemala
0

| | | | 1 | 2 | 3 | 4 | 5 |
|---|---|---|---|---|---|---|---|
| 1 | (Uruguay) (Guatemala) | Federico Dondo; Fernando Samayoa | 6; 2 | 4; 6 | 6; 1 | 6; 1 |
| 2 | (Uruguay) (Guatemala) | Marcelo Filippini; Alexander Lehnhoff | 6; 3 | 6; 2 | 6; 0 |
| 3 | (Uruguay) (Guatemala) | Marcelo Filippini / Gonzalo Rodríguez; Luis Pérez Chete / Fernando Samayoa | 6; 1 | 6; 1 | 6; 2 |
| 4 | (Uruguay) (Guatemala) | Marcelo Filippini; Fernando Samayoa | 6; 3 | 6; 2 |
| 5 | (Uruguay) (Guatemala) | Federico Dondo; Alexander Lehnhoff | 6; 3 | 6; 3 |

=== Colombia vs. Puerto Rico ===
Colombia
5
Los Lagartos Country Club, Bogotá, Colombia
9–11 February 1996
Clay

Puerto Rico
0

| | | | 1 | 2 | 3 | 4 | 5 |
|---|---|---|---|---|---|---|---|
| 1 | (Colombia) (Puerto Rico) | Miguel Tobón; Jorge González | 6; 2 | 6; 2 | 7; 5 |
| 2 | (Colombia) (Puerto Rico) | Mauricio Hadad; Rafael Jordan | 6; 0 | 6; 2 | 6; 2 |
| 3 | (Colombia) (Puerto Rico) | Mauricio Hadad / Miguel Tobón; Jorge González / Rafael Jordan | 6; 4 | 7^{7} 6^{3} | 6^{6} 7^{8} | 6^{5} 7^{7} | 6; 3 |
| 4 | (Colombia) (Puerto Rico) | Mauricio Hadad; Jorge González | 6; 0 | 4; 6 | 6; 2 |
| 5 | (Colombia) (Puerto Rico) | Miguel Tobón; Rafael Jordan | 6; 3 | 6; 4 |

=== Cuba vs. Paraguay ===
Cuba
3
Estadio National, Havana, Cuba
9–11 February 1996
Hard

Paraguay
2

| | | | 1 | 2 | 3 | 4 | 5 |
|---|---|---|---|---|---|---|---|
| 1 | (Cuba) (Paraguay) | Armando Pérez; Ramón Delgado | 6^{5} 7^{7} | 4; 6 | 1; 6 |
| 2 | (Cuba) (Paraguay) | Juan Pino; Ricardo Mena | 6; 2 | 6; 3 | 6; 1 |
| 3 | (Cuba) (Paraguay) | Armando Pérez / Juan Pino; Ramón Delgado / Ricardo Mena | 6; 4 | 7; 5 | 6; 2 |
| 4 | (Cuba) (Paraguay) | Juan Pino; Ramón Delgado | 6^{4} 7^{7} | 6; 4 | 2; 6 | 6; 4 | 11; 9 |
| 5 | (Cuba) (Paraguay) | Armando Pérez; Ricardo Mena | 6; 1 | 4; 6 | 3; 6 |

=== Ecuador vs. Barbados ===
Ecuador
5
Tenis Club Francisco Segura, Guayaquil, Ecuador
9–11 February 1996
Clay

Barbados
0

| | | | 1 | 2 | 3 | 4 | 5 |
|---|---|---|---|---|---|---|---|
| 1 | (Ecuador) (Barbados) | Luis Morejón; Martin Blackman | 6^{5} 7^{7} | 6; 1 | 6; 1 | 6; 2 |
| 2 | (Ecuador) (Barbados) | Nicolás Lapentti; Richard Ashby | 6; 2 | 7^{7} 6^{2} | 6; 3 |
| 3 | (Ecuador) (Barbados) | Andrés Gómez / Nicolás Lapentti; Richard Ashby / Martin Blackman | 7; 5 | 6; 2 | 6; 1 |
| 4 | (Ecuador) (Barbados) | Nicolás Lapentti; Martin Blackman | 6; 1 | 6; 2 |
| 5 | (Ecuador) (Barbados) | Luis Morejón; Richard Ashby | 7^{9} 6^{7} | 6; 2 |

== Second round ==
=== Uruguay vs. Colombia ===
Uruguay
3
Carrasco Lawn Tennis Club, Montevideo, Uruguay
5–7 April 1996
Clay

Colombia
2

| | | | 1 | 2 | 3 | 4 | 5 |
|---|---|---|---|---|---|---|---|
| 1 | (Uruguay) (Colombia) | Marcelo Filippini; Mario Rincón | 6; 4 | 6; 3 | 6; 1 |
| 2 | (Uruguay) (Colombia) | Federico Dondo; Mauricio Hadad | 0; 6 | 2; 6 | 3; 6 |
| 3 | (Uruguay) (Colombia) | Marcelo Filippini / Gonzalo Rodríguez; Mauricio Hadad / Mario Rincón | 3; 6 | 6; 3 | 5; 7 | 3; 6 |
| 4 | (Uruguay) (Colombia) | Marcelo Filippini; Philippe Moggio | 6; 2 | 7; 5 | 6; 2 |
| 5 | (Uruguay) (Colombia) | Federico Dondo; Mario Rincón | 4; 6 | 6; 1 | 6; 2 | 6; 3 |

=== Cuba vs. Ecuador ===
Cuba
0
Estadio National, Havana, Cuba
5–7 April 1996
Hard

Ecuador
3

| | | | 1 | 2 | 3 | 4 | 5 |
|---|---|---|---|---|---|---|---|---|
| 1 | (Cuba) (Ecuador) | Armando Pérez; Nicolás Lapentti | 1; 6 | 0; 6 | 2; 6 |
| 2 | (Cuba) (Ecuador) | Juan Pino; Luis Morejón | 6; 4 | 6^{4} 7^{7} | 1; 6 | 6; 3 | 6; 8 |
| 3 | (Cuba) (Ecuador) | Lázaro Navarro-Batles / Juan Pino; Andrés Gómez / Nicolás Lapentti | 6^{3} 7^{7} | 4; 6 | 4; 6 |
| 4 | (Cuba) (Ecuador) | Lázaro Navarro-Batles; Andrés Gómez | | | | | | not played |
| 5 | (Cuba) (Ecuador) | Armando Pérez; Luis Morejón | | | | | | not played |

== Relegation play-offs ==
=== Guatemala vs. Puerto Rico ===
Guatemala
1
National Centre, Guatemala City, Guatemala
3–5 May 1996
Hard

Puerto Rico
4

| | | | 1 | 2 | 3 | 4 | 5 |
|---|---|---|---|---|---|---|---|
| 1 | (Guatemala) (Puerto Rico) | Alexander Lehnhoff; Jorge González | 4; 6 | 2; 6 | 4; 6 |
| 2 | (Guatemala) (Puerto Rico) | Fernando Samayoa; Rafael Jordan | 6; 3 | 7^{7} 6^{4} | 4; 6 | 3; 6 | 6; 2 |
| 3 | (Guatemala) (Puerto Rico) | Fernando Samayoa / Luis Valencia; Jorge González / Jean Paul Vissepó | 2; 6 | 5; 7 | 7; 5 | 6; 3 | 7; 9 |
| 4 | (Guatemala) (Puerto Rico) | Fernando Samayoa; Jorge González | 3; 6 | 6^{5} 7^{7} | 3; 6 |
| 5 | (Guatemala) (Puerto Rico) | Alexander Lehnhoff; Rafael Jordan | 2; 6 | 4; 6 |

=== Paraguay vs. Barbados ===
Paraguay
5
Yacht y Golf Club Paraguayo, Asunción, Paraguay
5–7 April 1996
Clay

Barbados
0

| | | | 1 | 2 | 3 | 4 | 5 |
|---|---|---|---|---|---|---|---|
| 1 | (Paraguay) (Barbados) | Ricardo Mena; Martin Blackman | 6; 4 | 7^{7} 6^{3} | 6; 4 |
| 2 | (Paraguay) (Barbados) | Ramón Delgado; Richard Ashby | 7^{7} 6^{2} | 6; 2 | 6; 2 |
| 3 | (Paraguay) (Barbados) | Ramón Delgado / Ricardo Mena; Richard Ashby / Martin Blackman | 3; 6 | 6; 2 | 7; 5 | 6; 2 |
| 4 | (Paraguay) (Barbados) | Ramón Delgado; Duane Williams | 6; 0 | 6; 1 |
| 5 | (Paraguay) (Barbados) | Ricardo Mena; Richard Ashby | 6; 4 | 6; 2 |

== Third round ==
=== Ecuador vs. Uruguay ===
Ecuador
4
Guayaquil Tenis Club, Guayaquil, Ecuador
20–22 September 1996
Clay

Uruguay
1

| | | | 1 | 2 | 3 | 4 | 5 |
|---|---|---|---|---|---|---|---|
| 1 | (Ecuador) (Uruguay) | Nicolás Lapentti; Federico Dondo | 6; 4 | 7; 5 | 6; 1 |
| 2 | (Ecuador) (Uruguay) | Pablo Campana; Marcelo Filippini | 2; 6 | 1; 6 | 1; 6 |
| 3 | (Ecuador) (Uruguay) | Andrés Gómez / Nicolás Lapentti; Marcelo Filippini / Gonzalo Rodríguez | 6; 4 | 6; 3 | 7^{7} 6^{2} |
| 4 | (Ecuador) (Uruguay) | Nicolás Lapentti; Marcelo Filippini | 6; 3 | 6; 4 | 2; 6 | 6; 2 |
| 5 | (Ecuador) (Uruguay) | Luis Morejón; Federico Dondo | 6; 4 | 6; 1 |
