= Tennis at the 1987 Pan American Games =

Tennis at the Parapan American Games
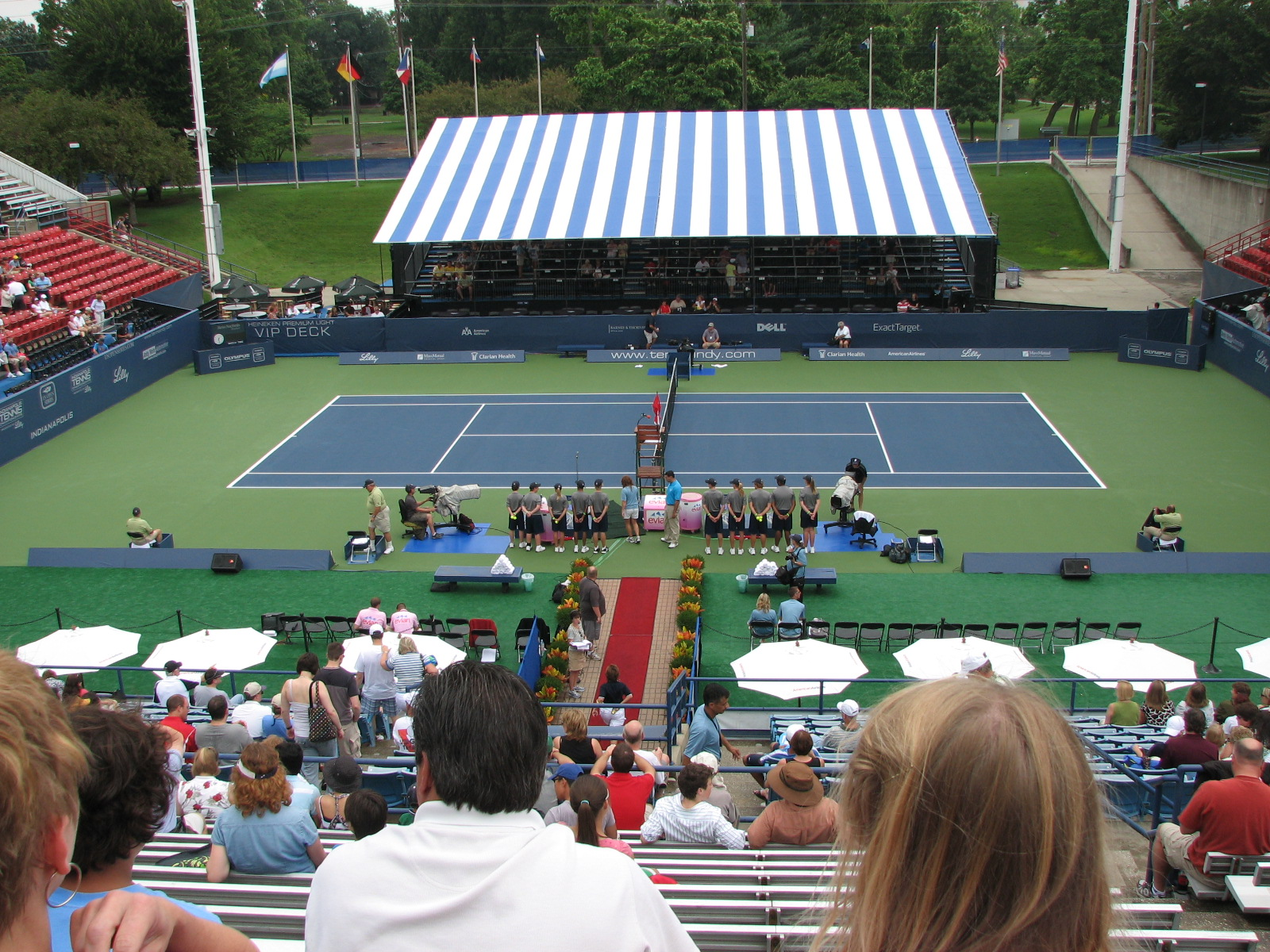
- Indianapolis Tennis Center, the tennis venue of the games
- Venue: Indianapolis Tennis Center
- Dates: August 13-23, 1987
- No. of events: 5 (2 men, 2 women, 1 mixed)
- Competitors: 71 from 20 nations

Tennis competitions at the 1987 Pan American Games in Indianapolis took place from July 13 to 23 at the Indianapolis Tennis Center. A total of five events were held, two each for men and women and a mixed doubles event.

== Medal events ==
Event	Gold	Silver	Bronze
Men's singles	Fernando Roese; Brazil	Al Parker; United States	Luke Jensen; United States; Pedro Albano; Argentina
Women's singles	Gisele Miró; Brazil	Adriana Isaza; Colombia	María Méndez; Argentina
Women's singles	Gisele Miró; Brazil	Adriana Isaza; Colombia	Patricia Miller; Uruguay
Men's doubles	United States; Luke Jensen; Patrick McEnroe	Mexico; Agustin Moreno; Fernando Pérez	Costa Rica; Fred Thome; Kenneth Thome
Men's doubles	United States; Luke Jensen; Patrick McEnroe	Mexico; Agustin Moreno; Fernando Pérez	Guatemala; Daniel Chavez; Favio Sical
Women's doubles	United States; Sonia Hahn; Ronni Reis	Argentina; Maria Mendez; Andrea Tiezzi	Mexico; Lucila Becerra; Claudia Hernandez
Women's doubles	United States; Sonia Hahn; Ronni Reis	Argentina; Maria Mendez; Andrea Tiezzi	Puerto Rico; Marilda Julia; Emilie Viqueira
Mixed doubles	Mexico; Lucila Becerra; Gilberto Cicero	Argentina; Pablo Albano; Andrea Tiezzi	Brazil; Fernando Roese; Gisele Miro
Mixed doubles	Mexico; Lucila Becerra; Gilberto Cicero	Argentina; Pablo Albano; Andrea Tiezzi	Cuba; Juan Pino; Belkis Rodriguez

== Medal table ==
Place	Nation	Gold medal	Silver medal	Bronze medal	Total
1	United States	2	1	1	4
2	Brazil	2	0	1	3
3	Mexico	1	1	1	3
4	Argentina	0	2	2	4
5	Colombia	0	1	0	1
6	Cuba	0	0	1	1
6	Costa Rica	0	0	1	1
6	Guatemala	0	0	1	1
6	Uruguay	0	0	1	1
6	Puerto Rico	0	0	1	1
Total		5	5	10	20
