= Raúl Contreras =

Mexican tennis player (1943–2019)

- Country (sports): Mexico
- Born: 16 September 1943; Mexico City, Mexico
- Died: 18 February 2019 (aged 75)
- Plays: Right-handed

Singles

Grand Slam singles results
- French Open: Q2 (1974)
- Wimbledon: Q1 (1974)

Doubles

Grand Slam doubles results
- French Open: 1R (1974)
Medal record
Pan American Games
Silver medal – second place	1975 Mexico City	Men's doubles

Raúl Contreras (16 September 1943 – 18 February 2019) was a Mexican professional tennis player.

Born in Mexico City, Contreras played collegiate tennis in the United States for San Jose State University during the 1960s. He was the younger brother of Davis Cup player Francisco "Pancho" Contreras and although he came close to Davis Cup selection himself, he never made the side.

Contreras competed in the men's doubles main draw of the 1974 French Open.

Representing Mexico at the 1975 Pan American Games, Contreras teamed up with Adolfo González to claim a silver medal in the men's doubles, behind Americans Butch Walts and Bruce Manson. He won two matches in the singles draw before falling in the quarter-final stage to Puerto Rico's Freddy de Jesús.
