= Adolfo González =

Mexican tennis player

- Full name: Adolfo González
- Country (sports): Mexico
- Born: 8 January 1952 (age 74)

Singles
- Career record: 3–3
- Career titles: 0
- Highest ranking: No. 255 (22 December 1980)
Medal record
Men's Tennis
Pan American Games
Silver medal – second place	1975 Mexico City	Singles
Silver medal – second place	1975 Mexico City	Doubles
Bronze medal – third place	1975 Mexico City	Mixed

Adolfo González (born 8 January 1952) is a former tennis player from Mexico.

== Biography ==
González won medals in all three tennis events at the 1975 Pan American Games, including a silver in the men's singles. He also came second in the men's doubles with Raúl Contreras and won a bronze medal in the mixed doubles partnering Alejandra Vallejo.

During Mexico's 1976 Davis Cup campaign, González featured in a tie against the Caribbean team at home in Mexico City. He played in the doubles rubber, which he and partner Roberto Chávez won in straight sets, over Alan Price and Michael Valdez.

His best performance on the Grand Prix circuit came in 1981 at the Mexico City tournament, where he made it to the semi-finals, with wins over Cliff Letcher, Jimmy Arias and Klaus Eberhard.

== Challenger titles ==
=== Singles: (1) ===
No.	Year	Tournament	Surface	Opponent	Score
1.	1980	San Luis Potosi, Mexico	Clay	(Mexico) Guillermo Stevens	6–4, 6–4

== See also ==
- List of Mexico Davis Cup team representatives
