= Ingrid Metzner =

Brazilian tennis player

- Country (sports): Brazil
- Born: 27 May 1937 (age 89) Rio de Janeiro, Brazil

Grand Slam singles results
- French Open: 1R (1956)
- Wimbledon: 2R (1956)
Medal record
Pan American Games
Bronze medal – third place	1955 Mexico City	Women's singles
Bronze medal – third place	1955 Mexico City	Women's doubles

Ingrid Charlotte Dreschler (née Metzner; born 27 May 1937) is a Brazilian former tennis player.

Born in Rio de Janeiro, Metzner comes from a family of German descent. She was raised in São Paulo from the age of nine and trained at the local Esporte Clube Pinheiros.

Metzner represented Brazil at the 1955 Pan American Games and won a bronze medal in the singles, as well as a bronze medal in the doubles, partnering Maria Bueno.

In 1956 she went to Europe and participated in both the French Championships and Wimbledon, becoming the first Brazilian woman to compete in either event. At the French Championships she took a set off 12th seed Darlene Hard in a first round loss, then at Wimbledon she made it through to the second round.
