= Copa del Cafe =

Tournament information
- Founded: 1965
- Location: San José; Costa Rica
- Category: ITF Junior Grade 1
- Surface: Red clay - outdoors
- Website: www.copacafe.cr

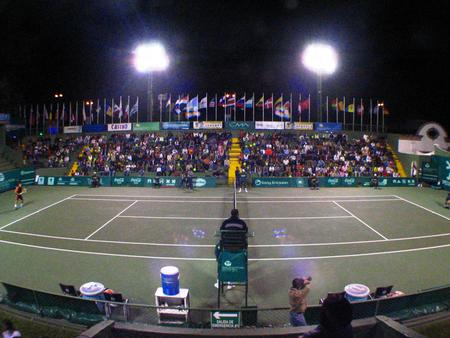
Copa del Cafe Center Court

The Copa del Café (Coffee Bowl) is an ITF Grade 1 tennis tournament played every January in San José, Costa Rica. The tournament is part of a junior circuit backed by the International Tennis Federation and supported by the tennis federations of many countries.

The tournament was started in 1965 with a group of tennis players at the Costa Rica Country Club. They formed an Organizing Committee, staffed by volunteer club members. Over the years the tournament has become more prestigious and international. The tournament has received strong international support from top players and dedicated coaches, and this has contributed enormously to its success. It is the oldest junior ITF tournament in Latin America and every year the Coffee Bowl receives entries from more than 40 countries. The tournament has televised night play every day, and averages over 3,000 spectators each day.

== Singles champions ==
Year	Boys	Girls
1965	(South Africa) Pat Cramer	Not played
1966	(Egypt) Ismail El Shafei	Not played
1967	(Rhodesia) Andrew Pattison	Not played
1968	(West Germany) Karl Meiler	Not played
1969	(Czechoslovakia) Jiří Hřebec	Not played
1970	(South Africa) Byron Bertram	Not played
1971	(United States) Brian Gottfried	Not played
1972	(Spain) José Higueras	Not played
1973	(Sweden) Björn Borg	Not played
1974	(South Africa) John Eagleton	Not played
1975	(Czechoslovakia) Tomáš Šmíd	Not played
1976	(Sweden) Jan Källqvist	Not played
1977	(West Germany) Andreas Maurer	Not played
1978	(Czechoslovakia) Ivan Lendl	Not played
1979	(South Africa) Schalk van der Merwe	Not played
1980	(Italy) Luca Bottazzi	Not played
1981	(Israel) Schaker Perkis	Not played
1982	(Mexico) Fernando Pérez Pascal	Not played
1983	(United States) Bobby Blair	Not played
1984	(United States) Shelby Cannon	(Czechoslovakia) Andrea Holíková
1985	(El Salvador) Miguel Merz	(Socialist Federal Republic of Yugoslavia) Karmen Škulj
1986	(Spain) Tomás Carbonell	(Belgium) Sandra Wasserman
1987	(Finland) Janne Holtari	(Poland) Katarzyna Nowak
1988	(Venezuela) Juan Carlos Bianchi	(Germany) Maja Živec-Škulj
1989	(Venezuela) Juan Carlos Bianchi	(South Africa) Michelle Anderson
1990	(South Africa) Marcos Ondruska	(South Africa) Michelle Anderson
1991	(South Africa) John-Laffnie de Jager	(Mexico) Isabela Petrov
1992	(Austria) Herbert Wiltschnig	(Socialist Federal Republic of Yugoslavia) Branislava Ivanović
1993	(Romania) Răzvan Sabău	(Paraguay) Magalí Benítez
1994	(Paraguay) Ramón Delgado	(Slovakia) Henrieta Nagyová
1994	(Paraguay) Ramón Delgado	(Slovakia) Henrieta Nagyová
1995	(Socialist Federal Republic of Yugoslavia) Djorde Matijević	(Austria) Barbara Schwartz
1996	(France) Arnaud Di Pasquale	(Croatia) Marijana Kovačević
1997	(Chile) Nicolás Massú	(Slovenia) Maja Matevžič
1998	(Russia) Artem Derepasko	(Germany) Mia Buric
1999	(United States) Levar Harper-Griffith	(Germany) Caroline-Ann Basu
2000	(France) Julien Maigret	(Croatia) Matea Mezak
2001	(Serbia) Janko Tipsarević	(Argentina) Gisela Dulko
2002	(Uruguay) Marcel Felder	(Croatia) Matea Mezak
2003	(The Bahamas) Devin Mullings	(Netherlands) Michaëlla Krajicek
2004	(Spain) Guillermo Alcaide	(Belarus) Olga Govortsova
2005	(Netherlands) Robin Haase	(Canada) Aleksandra Wozniak
2006	(Netherlands) Thiemo de Bakker	(Romania) Mihaela Buzărnescu
2007	(Brazil) Fernando Romboli	(Russia) Anastasia Pivovarova
2008	(Russia) Alexei Grigorov	(Romania) Ana Bogdan
2009	(Venezuela) David Souto	(United States) Madison Keys
2010	(Argentina) Renzo Olivo	(Belgium) An-Sophie Mestach
2011	(Bolivia) Hugo Dellien	(Belgium) An-Sophie Mestach
2012	(United States) Noah Rubin	(United States) Sachia Vickery
2013	(Serbia) Nikola Milojević	(Russia) Varvara Flink
2014	(Russia) Roman Safiullin	(United States) CiCi Bellis
2015	(Norway) Casper Ruud	(United States) Michaela Gordon
2016	(United States) J. J. Wolf	(United States) Amanda Anisimova
2017	(United States) Vasil Kirkov	(United Kingdom) Emily Appleton
2018	(France) Harold Mayot	(Colombia) Camila Osorio
2019	(Japan) Shintaro Mochizuki	(United States) Abigail Forbes
2020	(Brazil) Natan Rodrigues	(China) Lan Mi
2021	Cancelled	Cancelled
2022	(United States) Sebastian Gorzny	(United States) Sonya Macavei
2023	(Netherlands) Thijs Boogaard	(United States) Iva Jovic
2024	(United States) Ian Mayew	(United States) Shannon Lam
2025	(United States) Ryan Cozad	(Germany) Mariella Thamm
2026	(France) Mathys Domenc	(United States) Janae Preston

== Doubles champions ==
Year	Boys	Girls
↓ Grade 2 ↓
1993	(Costa Rica) Juan Antonio Marín (South Africa) Jason Weir-Smith	(South Africa) Leanda Hitge (South Africa) Liezel Huber
1994	(Serbia and Montenegro) Vladimir Pavićević (Serbia and Montenegro) Nenad Zimonjić	(Slovakia) Michaela Hasanová (Slovakia) Martina Nedelková
1995	(Germany) Thomas Messmer (Germany) Tomas Zivnicek	(Poland) Magdalena Grzybowska (Poland) Aleksandra Olsza
↓ Grade 1 ↓
1996	(South Africa) Damien Roberts (South Africa) Wesley Whitehouse	(United Kingdom) Jheni Osman (United Kingdom) Katia Roubanova
1997	(France) Jérôme Haehnel (France) Julien Jeanpierre	(Hungary) Zsófia Gubacsi (Slovakia) Gabriela Voleková
1998	(Russia) Artem Derepasko (Russia) Igor Kunitsyn	(Venezuela) Milagros Sequera (Brazil) Carla Tiene
1999	(France) Julien Benneteau (France) Nicolas Mahut	(United States) Lauren Barnikow (United States) Alyssa Cohen
2000	(Israel) Harel Srugo (Israel) Tomer Suissa	(Socialist Federal Republic of Yugoslavia) Renata Ljukovčan (Netherlands) Ilona Somers
↓ Grade A ↓
2001	(Mexico) Bruno Echagaray (Mexico) Santiago González	(Argentina) María José Argeri (Argentina) Gisela Dulko
2002	(Venezuela) Rafael Abreu (United States) Stephen Amritraj	(Netherlands) Silvana Bauer (Netherlands) Elise Tamaëla
↓ Grade 1 ↓
2003	(Netherlands) Jesse Huta Galung (Netherlands) Coen van Keulen	(Colombia) Maryori Franco (Ukraine) Olena Tsutskova
2004	(Argentina) Juan Pablo Amado (Spain) Pablo Andújar	(Belarus) Victoria Azarenka (Belarus) Olga Govortsova
2005	(Netherlands) Robin Haase (Netherlands) Antal van der Duim	(Romania) Mihaela Buzărnescu (Netherlands) Bibiane Schoofs
2006	(Slovakia) Martin Kližan (Slovakia) Andrej Martin	(Netherlands) Marrit Boonstra (Netherlands) Renée Reinhard
2007	(United States) Jarmere Jenkins (United States) Bradley Klahn	(United States) Julia Cohen (Russia) Anastasia Pivovarova
2008	(Venezuela) David Souto (Argentina) Juan Vázquez-Valenzuela	(Romania) Ana Bogdan (Romania) Diana Marcu
2009	(Venezuela) Jesús Bandrés (Venezuela) David Souto	(Paraguay) Verónica Cepede Royg (Chile) Cecilia Costa Melgar
2010	(Canada) Nikolai Haessig (Canada) Edward Nguyen	(Belgium) An-Sophie Mestach (Netherlands) Demi Schuurs
2011	(United States) William Kwok (United States) Michael Rinaldi	(Bosnia and Herzegovina) Anita Husarić (Montenegro) Danka Kovinić
2012	(Sweden) Filip Bergevi (Sweden) Fred Simonsson	(Brazil) Laura Pigossi (Mexico) Marcela Zacarías
2013	(Croatia) Franko Miočić (Chile) Guillermo Núñez	(Mexico) Alejandra Cisneros (Mexico) Victoria Rodríguez
2014	(Peru) Nicolás Álvarez (Venezuela) Rafael Antonio Coutinho	(Belgium) Morgane Michiels (Belgium) Greet Minnen
2015	(United States) Oscar Janglin (United States) Emil Reinberg	(United States) Michaela Gordon (United States) Claire Liu
2016	(Bolivia) Juan Carlos Aguilar (United States) Ulises Blanch	(Italy) Federica Bilardo (Italy) Tatiana Pieri
2017	(United States) Gianni Ross (United States) Danny Thomas	(United Kingdom) Emily Appleton (United States) Sofia Sewing
2018	(United States) Tomas Kopczynski (United States) Keenan Mayo	(United States) Kylie Collins (United States) Shelly Yaloz
2019	(Japan) Shintaro Mochizuki (United States) Spencer Whitaker	(Israel) Shavit Kimchi (Slovakia) Michaela Kadlečková
2020	(United States) Jack Anthrop (United States) Maxwell McKennon	(Puerto Rico) Lauren Anzalotta Kynoch (United States) Jaedan Brown
2021	Cancelled	
2022	(United States) Cooper Williams (United States) Michael Zheng	(Slovakia) Nikola Daubnerová (Hungary) Luca Udvardy
2023	(Norway) Nicolai Budkov Kjær (United Kingdom) Henry Searle	(United States) Tyra Caterina Grant (United States) Iva Jovic
2024	(United States) Noah Johnston (United States) Benjamin Willwerth	(United States) Thea Frodin (United States) Shannon Lam
2025	(Denmark) Christian Gronfeldt-Sorensen (Denmark) August Brostroem Poulsen	(United States) Julieta Pareja (Germany) Mariella Thamm
2026	(United States) Safir Azam (United States) Marcel Latak	(United States) Jordyn Hazelitt (United States) Welles Newman
