= Felisa Piédrola =

Argentine tennis player

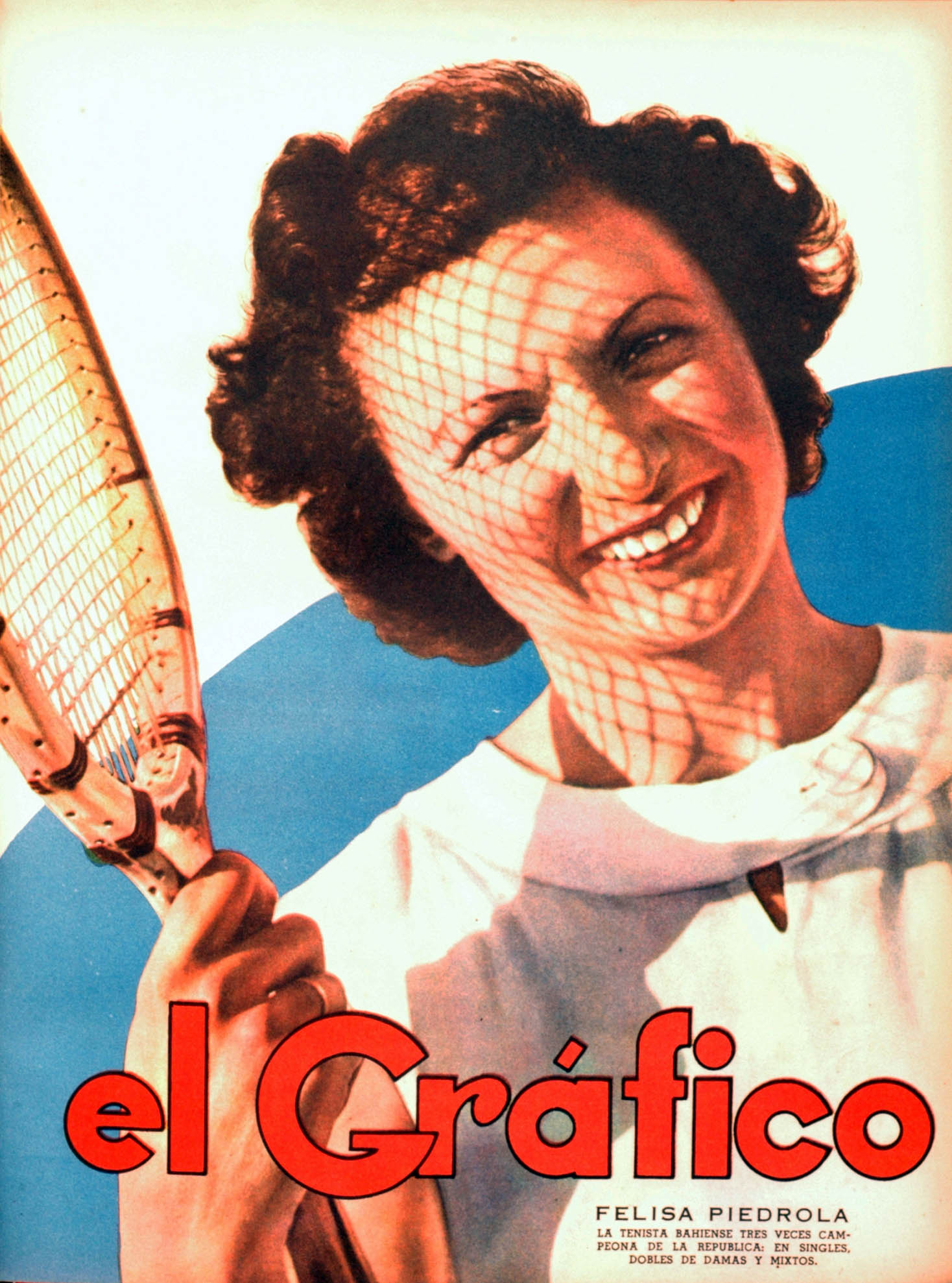
- Full name: Felisa Piédrola de Zappa
- Country (sports): Argentina
- Born: 13 May 1916 Punta Alta, Argentina
- Died: March 2000 (aged 83) Punta Alta, Argentina
- Retired: 1955
- Plays: Right-handed

Singles
- Career record: 85-51
- Career titles: 10
Medal record
Pan American Games
Gold medal – first place	1951 Buenos Aires	Women's Doubles
Silver medal – second place	1951 Buenos Aires	Women's Singles
Silver medal – second place	1951 Buenos Aires	Mixed Doubles

Felisa Piédrola de Zappa (13 May 1916 – March 2000) was an Argentine tennis player.

== Biography ==
Felisa Piédrola was born on 13 May 1916 in Punta Alta, Argentina. Originally a fencer, she turned to tennis after a serious injury in which her opponent's foil pierced her right armpit in practice.

Piédrola won the Argentina International Open six times (in 1938, 1939, 1942, 1943, 1944 and 1950). In 1951, she participated in the first Pan American Games, winning a gold medal in the women's doubles with María Teran de Weiss and silver in the women's singles and mixed doubles (with Enrique Morea). She was the number-one ranked tennis player in Argentina for six years.

She married amateur tennis player Augusto Zappa, with whom she played mixed doubles.

Piédrola died in March 2000 at the age of 83 and her remains were buried in the Punta Alta cemetery.
