= Alejandra Vallejo =

Mexican tennis player

- Country (sports): Mexico
- Born: 21 October 1958 (age 66)

Singles
- Career record: 13–19
- Highest ranking: No. 517 (21 December 1986)

Doubles
- Career record: 10–19
- Highest ranking: No. 405 (21 December 1986)
Medal record
Women's Tennis
Pan American Games
Silver medal – second place	1983 Caracas	Mixed
Bronze medal – third place	1983 Caracas	Doubles
Bronze medal – third place	1979 San Juan	Mixed
Bronze medal – third place	1975 Mexico City	Mixed

Alejandra Vallejo (born 21 October 1958) is a Mexican former professional tennis player.

Between 1976 and 1987, Vallejo represented Mexico in 16 Federation Cup ties. She was winless in her eight singles rubbers, but fared better in doubles, finishing with a 6/7 record.

Vallejo regularly competed at the Pan American Games and won four medals for Mexico, all in doubles.

Since retiring she has remained involved in Mexican tennis, serving in roles such as President of the local tennis association and as Fed Cup captain.

== ITF finals ==
=== Singles: 1 (0–1) ===
Outcome	Date	Tournament	Surface	Opponent	Score
Runner-up	11 October 1992	Mexico City, Mexico	Clay	(Mexico) Lucila Becerra	2–6, 6–3, 1–6
