= Christopher Mark =

Mine safety specialist credited with improving mine safety

As of 2025, Christopher Mark is the current principal roof control specialist for the U.S. Mine Safety and Health Administration (MSHA), an agency of the Department of Labor. He has been in this role since 2010, most notably achieving a landmark zero fatalities attributed to roof falls in 2016—the first year on record without such casualties. He previously worked for 23 years as the leader of the ground control research program at the National Institute for Occupational Safety and Health.

Mark was profiled by Michael Lewis in The Washington Post 2024.

== Awards ==
Christopher Mark has earned multiple awards for his accomplishments, both for his work as principal roof control specialist and leader of the ground control research program. Dates before 2010 are for his job in the ground control research program.

Award Name	Date Given
Syd S. & Felicia F. Peng Ground Control in Mining Award	2006
AIME Erskine Ramsay Medal	2014
Sammies Award	2024
