= Tennis at the 1951 Pan American Games =

Tennis at the 1951 Pan American Games was held at Buenos Aires in March 1951.

== Medal events ==
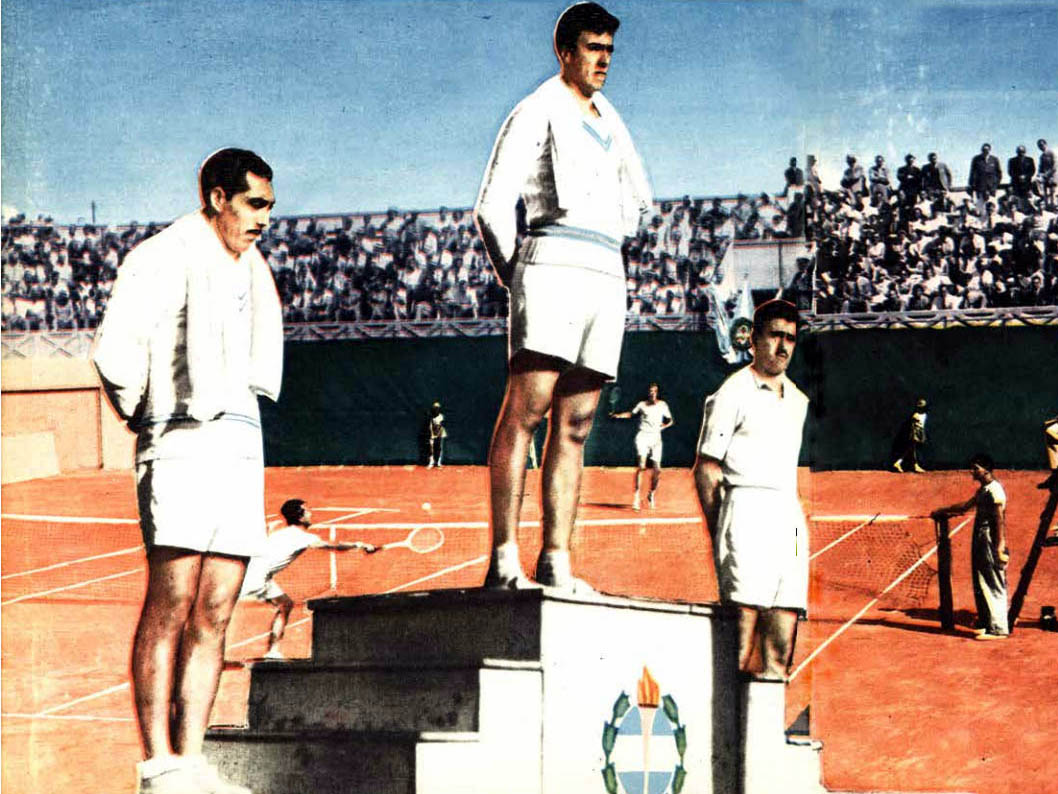
The podium

| Event | Gold | Silver | Bronze |
|---|---|---|---|
| Men's singles | Enrique Morea; Argentina | Alejo Russell; Argentina | Gustavo Palafox; Mexico |
| Women's singles | María Teran de Weiss; Argentina | Felisa Piédrola de Zappa; Argentina | Melita Ramírez; Mexico |
| Men's doubles | Argentina; Enrique Morea; Alejo Russell | Chile; Carlos Sanhueza; Luis Ayala | Mexico; Gustavo Palafox; Anselmo Puente |
| Women's doubles | Argentina; María Teran de Weiss; Felisa Piédrola de Zappa | Mexico; Hilda Heyn; Melita Ramírez | Brazil; Helena Stark; Silvia Villari |
| Mixed doubles | Mexico; Melita Ramírez; Gustavo Palafox | Argentina; Enrique Morea; Felisa Piédrola de Zappa | Argentina; María Teran de Weiss; Alejo Russell |
