= Freddy de Jesús =

Puerto Rican tennis player

- Country (sports): Puerto Rico
- Born: October 30, 1954 (age 71) San Juan, Puerto Rico

Singles
- Career record: 2–13
- Highest ranking: No. 256 (July 29, 1974)

Doubles
- Career record: 0–7
- Highest ranking: No. 696 (January 4, 1981)
Medal record
Central American and Caribbean Games
Silver medal – second place	1974 Santo Domingo	Men's singles
Pan American Games
Silver medal – second place	1975 Mexico City	Mixed doubles
Bronze medal – third place	1975 Mexico City	Men's singles

Freddy de Jesús (born October 30, 1954) is a Puerto Rican former professional tennis player.

Born in San Juan, de Jesús was a Junior Orange Bowl winner in 1966, then in 1968 won the 14s Easter Bowl title for the tournament's inaugural year. While competing in the 16s age group he won U.S. national championships on both clay and hardcourt.

De Jesús played collegiate tennis for the University of Michigan, earning All-American honors in 1974 and 1975.

At the 1975 Pan American Games in Mexico City, de Jesús won two medals for Puerto Rico. He beat Chile's Álvaro Fillol in the bronze medal play-off and partnering Maria Annexy was runner-up in the mixed doubles, to Lele Forood and Hank Pfister.

His best performance on the Grand Prix tennis circuit was a quarter-final appearance at the San Juan Open in 1981.

De Jesús was a 1991 inductee into the Puerto Rico Sports Hall of Fame.
