= Jacobo Chávez =

Guatemalan tennis player

- Country (sports): Guatemala
- Born: 12 January 1971 (age 54); Guatemala City, Guatemala
- Plays: Right-handed

Singles
- Career record: No. 644 (15 Jan 1996)
- Career titles: 14–12 (Davis Cup)

Doubles
- Career record: 14–5 (Davis Cup)
- Highest ranking: No. 515 (11 Nov 1996)

Jacobo Chávez (born 12 January 1971) is a Guatemalan former professional tennis player.

Born in Guatemala City, Chávez represented his country at the 1991 Pan American Games, where he reached the round of 16 in the singles event. Between 1993 and 2005 he appeared in a total of 30 Davis Cup ties, winning 14 rubbers each in singles and doubles. He won a team record nine doubles rubbers partnering his brother Daniel. One of his singles wins was a comeback from two-sets down to beat Iván Miranda of Peru in a 2002 tie.

Chávez is the second youngest of four brothers to play in the Davis Cup, with two elder brothers Carlos and Daniel, along with younger brother Manuel, all competing for Guatemala.
