= Doug Burke (tennis) =

Jamaican tennis player

- Country (sports): Jamaica
- Residence: Toronto, Ontario, Canada
- Born: 25 July 1963 (age 62) Kingston, Jamaica
- Height: 1.80 m (5 ft 11 in)
- Turned pro: 1986
- Plays: Right-handed
- Prize money: $40,488

Singles
- Career record: 8–9
- Career titles: 0
- Highest ranking: No. 175 (14 Nov 1988)

Doubles
- Career record: 1–8
- Career titles: 0
- Highest ranking: No. 262 (26 Feb 1990)

Douglas Burke (born 25 July 1963) is a former professional tennis player from Jamaica.

== Career ==
Burke was the Canadian Junior Champion in both the Under-18s and Under-21 categories.

The Jamaican born player competed in collegiate tennis for Southern Illinois University Edwardsville in the early 1980s and was an NCAA All-American on five occasions, for singles in 1981 and for both singles and doubles in 1982 and 1983. He and Ken Flach were the 1982 NCAA Division II doubles champions.

Burke began representing the Jamaican team in Davis Cup competition in 1987. He went on to appear in a total of 18 ties, before retiring in 1995. Of his 36 rubbers, Burke won 20, 11 in singles and nine in doubles. His partnership with fellow Canadian-Jamaican player Karl Hale, which resulted in eight wins, remains a national record.

In 1988, at New York's OTB Open, Burke became the first Jamaican to reach a quarter-final on the Grand Prix tennis circuit. He had wins over Jim Gurfein and Martin Blackman, before falling in the quarter-finals to Pete Sampras. The following year he was also a quarter-finalist at the BP National Championships in Wellington, beating Peter Doohan and David Lewis.

== Personal life ==
Burke grew up in Jamaica but completed his schooling in Canada, where he and his family immigrated to in 1978. He attended the Southern Illinois University Edwardsville in the United States, then returned to Canada. Although he opted to represent Jamaica during his career on tour, he remained based in Toronto.

His son, Brandon Burke, is also a Jamaican Davis Cup player.

== Coaching ==
Burke was the director of Tennis Jamaica from 1994 to 2011. Doug Burke joined ACE, a high performance tennis development program in Burlington, Ontario as Tennis Director in August 2011. He was recently named President.
