= Kenneth Thome =

Costa Rican tennis player

- Full name: Kenneth Thome Bolaños
- Country (sports): Costa Rica
- Born: 1 November 1968 (age 56); San José, Costa Rica
- Height: 6 ft 1 in (185 cm)
- Plays: Right-handed
Medal record
Pan American Games
Bronze medal – third place	1987 Indianapolis	Men's doubles
Central American Games
Gold medal – first place	1994 San Salvador	Men's doubles
Gold medal – first place	1994 San Salvador	Mixed doubles
Bronze medal – third place	1994 San Salvador	Men's singles
Bronze medal – third place	1994 San Salvador	Men's team
Bronze medal – third place	2017 Managua	Mixed doubles

Kenneth Thome Bolaños (born 1 November 1968) is a Costa Rican former tennis player.

Born in San José, Thome is a grandson of Costa Rican international footballer Hernán Bolaños and younger brother of tennis player Fred Thome. He won a bronze medal partnering his brother in doubles at the 1987 Pan American Games.

Thome, who played tennis for Rice University, featured in 14 Davis Cup ties for Costa Rica during the 1990s. He won eight of his nine singles rubbers and had an 11–3 record in doubles.

A four-time medalist at the 1994 Central American Games, he returned as a 49-year old to compete in mixed doubles at the 2017 edition in Managua and with partner Andrea Brenes won a playoff for the bronze medal.
