= José Medrano =

Bolivian footballer (born 1968)

Personal information
- Date of birth: 16 May 1968 (age 58)
- Place of birth: Santa Cruz de la Sierra, Bolivia

International career
| Years | Team | Apps | (Gls) |
| 1991 | Bolivia | 2 | (0) |

José Medrano (born 16 May 1968) is a Bolivian footballer. He played in two matches for the Bolivia national football team in 1991. He was also part of Bolivia's squad for the 1991 Copa América tournament.
