= Fred Thome =

Costa Rican tennis player

- Full name: Frederick Joseph Thome Bolaños
- Country (sports): Costa Rica
- Born: 8 February 1966 (age 59)

Singles
- Career record: 2–2 (Davis Cup)

Doubles
- Career record: 5–2 (Davis Cup)
Medal record
Pan American Games
Bronze medal – third place	1987 Indianapolis	Men's doubles

Frederick Joseph Thome Bolaños (born 8 February 1966) is a Costa Rican former tennis player.

Thome is of Chilean descent on his mother's side of the family. His grandfather, Hernán Bolaños, was a footballer for the national side who played for the Audax Italiano club in Chile and married a local.

A runner-up at the Coffee Bowl in 1984, Thome is the elder brother of his Davis Cup teammate Kenneth. The pair teamed up together to win a bronze medal in doubles at the 1987 Pan American Games, which was Costa Rica's first ever Pan American Games tennis medal. Between 1990 and 1994 he appeared in nine Davis Cup ties, winning two singles and five doubles rubbers.

Thome, now a US based airline executive, played college tennis while studying at the University of Texas at Austin.
