= Fernando Samayoa =

Mexican football manager

Personal information
- Full name: Fernando Samayoa González
- Date of birth: 15 October 1989 (age 37)
- Place of birth: Guadalajara, Jalisco, Mexico
- Height: 5 ft 6 in (1.68 m)

Team information
- Current team: Tijuana (women) (Manager)

Senior career*
Years	Team	Apps	(Gls)
2011–2012	Hermosillo		

Managerial career
- 2018–2022: Atlas (women)
- 2022–2023: Atlético San Luis (women)
- 2024–2025: Querétaro (women)
- 2026–: Tijuana (women)
- * Club domestic league appearances and goals

Fernando Samayoa (born 15 October 1989) is a Mexican manager and a former player who was the manager for Atlético de San Luis Femenil from 2021 to 2023.

== Club career ==
Samayoa played his first game in 2011 with Hermosillo.

== Coaching career ==
In 2018, Samayoa became the manager for Atlas.

In 2022, Samayoa was named the coach for Atlético San Luis.
