= Miguel Merz =

Salvadoran tennis player (born 1967)

- Country (sports): El Salvador
- Born: 9 June 1967 (age 57); Basel, Switzerland
- Plays: Right-handed
- Prize money: $11,880

Singles
- Career record: 1–1
- Highest ranking: No. 254 (4 May 1992)

Grand Slam singles results
- Wimbledon: Q1 (1992)

Miguel Merz (born 9 June 1967) is a Salvadoran former professional tennis player.

== Biography ==
Born in Switzerland to German parents, Merz was an immigrant to El Salvador and represented his adoptive country in a total of 31 Davis Cup ties. He won 38 matches in his Davis Cup career, 23 in singles and 15 in doubles.

Merz, a right-handed player, competed on the professional tour during the 1990s. He reached a career best singles ranking of 254 in the world, which was highest attained by a Salvadoran until beaten by Marcelo Arévalo. His best ATP Tour performance was a second round appearance at the 1991 Geneva Open and he featured in the qualifying draw for the 1992 Wimbledon Championships.
