= Daniel Chávez (tennis) =

Guatemalan tennis player

- Full name: Daniel Chávez Morales
- Country (sports): Guatemala
- Born: 27 January 1966 (age 59)

Singles
- Career record: 12–12 (Davis Cup)

Doubles
- Career record: 17–7 (Davis Cup)
Medal record
Central American and Caribbean Games
Silver medal – second place	1986 Santiago	Men's team
Pan American Games
Bronze medal – third place	1987 Indianapolis	Men's doubles

Daniel Chávez Morales (born 27 January 1966) is a Guatemalan former tennis player.

Chávez represented Guatemala at the 1987 Pan American Games and won a bronze medal in the men's doubles, with Fabio Sical. They were beaten in the semi-finals by eventual gold medalists Luke Jensen and Patrick McEnroe.

Debuting in 1990, Chávez featured in a total of 31 ties for the Guatemala Davis Cup team. He won 29 rubbers for his country, 12 in singles and 17 in doubles. His doubles win tally is a national record and includes nine partnering his brother Jacobo. In his final Davis Cup appearance in 2004 he also served as team captain.

In 2007 he was appointed to captain Guatemala in the Fed Cup.
