= Guatemala Davis Cup team =

National men's tennis team

The Guatemala national tennis team represents Guatemala in Davis Cup tennis competition and are governed by the Federación Nacional de Tenis de Guatemala.

Guatemala currently compete in the Americas Zone of Group II. They have reached the Group II semifinals on three occasions.

== History ==
Guatemala competed in its first Davis Cup in 1990.

== Current team (2022) ==
- Kaeri Hernández
- Sebastián Domínguez
- Kris Hernández
- Rafael Botrán (Junior player)

== See also ==
- Davis Cup
- Guatemala Billie Jean King Cup team
