= 1999 Brasil Open – Singles =

Singles
- 1999 Brasil Open

Final
- Champion: (Colombia) Fabiola Zuluaga
- Runner-up: (Austria) Patricia Wartusch
- Score: 7–5, 4–6, 7–5

Events
| Singles | Doubles |
- Brasil Tennis Cup

The 1999 Brasil Open singles was the tennis singles event of the first edition of the most prestigious tournament in Brazil. South American Fabiola Zuluaga won the title, defeating Patricia Wartusch in the final.

== Seeds ==
1. (Israel) Anna Smashnova (first round)
2. (Spain) Cristina Torrens Valero (semifinals)
3. (Colombia) Fabiola Zuluaga (champion)
4. (Spain) Gala León García (semifinals)
5. (Argentina) Paola Suárez (second round)
6. (Netherlands) Amanda Hopmans (first round)
7. (Hungary) Rita Kuti-Kis (quarterfinals)
8. (Netherlands) Seda Noorlander (second round)

== Draw ==
Key

- Q = Qualifier
- WC = Wild card
- LL = Lucky loser
- Alt = Alternate
- ITF = ITF entry
- PR = Protected ranking
- SR = Special ranking
- SE = Special exempt
- JE = Junior exempt
- JR = Junior Accelerator Programme entrant
- CO = College Accelerator Programme entrant
- NG = Next Gen Accelerator Program entrant
- w/o = Walkover
- r = Retired
- d = Defaulted

=== Finals ===
Semifinals
(Austria) Patricia Wartusch | 6 | 1 | 6
4 | (Spain) Gala León García | 1 | 6 | 3
3 | (Colombia) Fabiola Zuluaga | 6 | 6
2 | (Spain) Cristina Torrens Valero | 3 | 3

Final
(Austria) Patricia Wartusch | 5 | 6 | 5
3 | (Colombia) Fabiola Zuluaga | 7 | 4 | 7

=== Top half ===
First round
1 | (Israel) A Smashnova | 4 | 2
(Austria) P Wartusch | 6 | 6
(Paraguay) L Schaerer | 1 | 4
WC | (Brazil) J Cortez | 6 | 6
(Spain) C Martínez Granados | 6 | 4 | 3
Q | (Spain) G Riera | 3 | 6 | 6
(Spain) M Ramón Climent | 6 | 6
6 | (Netherlands) A Hopmans | 4 | 1
4 | (Spain) G León García | 6 | 6
(Romania) A Vanc | 3 | 4
(United States) M Shaughnessy | 3 | 6 | 6
(Spain) E Bes-Ostáriz | 6 | 3 | 1
(Israel) H Rosen | 4 | 3
(Germany) A Barna | 6 | 6
(Italy) T Garbin | 4 | 4
7 | (Hungary) R Kuti-Kis | 6 | 6

Second round
(Austria) P Wartusch | 6 | 6
WC | (Brazil) J Cortez | 1 | 2
Q | (Spain) G Riera | 7^{8} | 6
(Spain) M Ramón Climent | 6^{6} | 0
4 | (Spain) G León García | 6 | 6
(United States) M Shaughnessy | 3 | 0
(Germany) A Barna | 2 | 3
7 | (Hungary) R Kuti-Kis | 6 | 6

Quarterfinals
(Austria) P Wartusch | 7^{7} | 6
Q | (Spain) G Riera | 6^{3} | 4
4 | (Spain) G León García | 7^{7} | 6
7 | (Hungary) R Kuti-Kis | 6^{5} | 1

Semifinals
(Austria) P Wartusch | 6 | 1 | 6
4 | (Spain) G León García | 1 | 6 | 3

=== Bottom half ===
First round
5 | (Argentina) P Suárez | 6 | 5 | 6
WC | (Brazil) V Menga | 3 | 7 | 1
(Italy) A Serra Zanetti | 6 | 7^{7}
Q | (Colombia) M Mesa | 3 | 6^{2}
(Slovakia) Ľ Cervanová | 5 | 3
(Argentina) F Labat | 7 | 6
(Slovakia) J Husárová | 1 | 6^{4}
3 | (Colombia) F Zuluaga | 6 | 7^{7}
8 | (Netherlands) S Noorlander | 6 | 1 | 6
Q | (Paraguay) R de los Ríos | 4 | 6 | 4
(Argentina) M Díaz Oliva | 3 | 4
(Hungary) P Mandula | 6 | 6
(Czech Republic) L Němečková | 6 | 1 | 6
Q | (Spain) A Goñi Blanco | 1 | 6 | 4
(Germany) M Schnitzer | 5 | 6 | 3
2 | (Spain) C Torrens Valero | 7 | 0 | 6

Second round
5 | (Argentina) P Suárez | 4 | 2
(Italy) A Serra Zanetti | 6 | 6
(Argentina) F Labat | 3 | 2
3 | (Colombia) F Zuluaga | 6 | 6
8 | (Netherlands) S Noorlander | 6 | 4 | 2
(Hungary) P Mandula | 2 | 6 | 6
(Czech Republic) L Němečková | 2 | 5
2 | (Spain) C Torrens Valero | 6 | 7

Quarterfinals
(Italy) A Serra Zanetti | 4 | 0
3 | (Colombia) F Zuluaga | 6 | 6
(Hungary) P Mandula | 4 | 2
2 | (Spain) C Torrens Valero | 6 | 6

Semifinals
3 | (Colombia) F Zuluaga | 6 | 6
2 | (Spain) C Torrens Valero | 3 | 3

== Qualifying ==
=== Seeds ===
1. (Spain) Rosa María Andrés Rodríguez (qualifying competition)
2. (Spain) Gisela Riera (Qualifier)
3. n.a.
4. (Venezuela) Milagros Sequera (second round)
5. (Spain) Ainhoa Goñi Blanco (Qualifier)
6. (Argentina) Luciana Masante (qualifying competition)
7. (Argentina) Melisa Arévalo (second round)
8. (Argentina) Romina Ottoboni (first round)
9. (Hungary) Adrienn Hegedűs (second round)

=== Qualifiers ===
1. (Paraguay) Rossana de los Ríos
2. (Colombia) Mariana Mesa
3. (Spain) Ainhoa Goñi Blanco
4. (Spain) Gisela Riera

== Qualifying draw ==
Key

- Q = Qualifier
- WC = Wild card
- LL = Lucky loser
- Alt = Alternate
- ITF = ITF entry
- PR = Protected ranking
- SR = Special ranking
- SE = Special exempt
- JE = Junior exempt
- JR = Junior Accelerator Programme entrant
- CO = College Accelerator Programme entrant
- NG = Next Gen Accelerator Program entrant
- w/o = Walkover
- r = Retired
- d = Defaulted

=== First qualifier ===
First round
1 | (Spain) Rosa María Andrés Rodríguez | 7^{7} | 7
(Brazil) Carla Tiene | 6^{2} | 5
(Argentina) Jorgelina Torti | 6 | 6
(Brazil) Natasha Lucki | 0 | 0
(Paraguay) Rossana de los Ríos | 6 | 6
(Germany) Veronika Martinek | 1 | 4
(Brazil) Nathália Bellizia | 2 | 4
9 | (Hungary) Adrienn Hegedűs | 6 | 6

Second round
1 | (Spain) Rosa María Andrés Rodríguez | 7^{8} | 6
(Argentina) Jorgelina Torti | 6^{6} | 2
(Paraguay) Rossana de los Ríos | 6 | 6
9 | (Hungary) Adrienn Hegedűs | 3 | 2

Qualifying competition
1 | (Spain) Rosa María Andrés Rodríguez | 6^{10} | 5
(Paraguay) Rossana de los Ríos | 7^{12} | 7

=== Second qualifier ===
First round
4 | (Venezuela) Milagros Sequera | 6 | 6
WC | (Brazil) Lisa Sendelbach | 2 | 2
WC | (Brazil) Carla Andrade | 0 | 0
(Colombia) Mariana Mesa | 6 | 6
(Argentina) Paula Racedo | 4 | 6 | 6
(Germany) Caroline Schneider | 6 | 4 | 3
WC | (Argentina) Laura Montalvo | 6 | 6
8 | (Argentina) Romina Ottoboni | 2 | 3

Second round
4 | (Venezuela) Milagros Sequera | 6 | 4 | 1
(Colombia) Mariana Mesa | 3 | 6 | 6
(Argentina) Paula Racedo | 6^{7} | 6 | 7
WC | (Argentina) Laura Montalvo | 7^{9} | 1 | 5

Qualifying competition
1 | (Colombia) Mariana Mesa | 6 | 4
(Argentina) Paula Racedo | 2 | 0^{r}

=== Third qualifier ===
First round
7 | (Argentina) Melisa Arévalo | 7 | 6
(Brazil) Miriam D'Agostini | 5 | 3
(Hungary) Virág Csurgó | 6 | 6
(Brazil) Patricia Alonso | 0 | 0
(Argentina) Geraldine Aizenberg | 6 | 7
(Brazil) Eugenia Maia | 2 | 5
WC | (Brazil) Maria Fernanda Alves | 3 | 1
5 | (Spain) Ainhoa Goñi Blanco | 6 | 6

Second round
7 | (Argentina) Melisa Arévalo | 1 | 4
(Hungary) Virág Csurgó | 6 | 6
(Argentina) Geraldine Aizenberg | 4 | 3
5 | (Spain) Ainhoa Goñi Blanco | 6 | 6

Qualifying competition
(Hungary) Virág Csurgó | 1 | 6 | 5
5 | (Spain) Ainhoa Goñi Blanco | 6 | 1 | 7

=== Fourth qualifier ===
First round
6 | (Argentina) Luciana Masante | 6 | 5
(Argentina) Sabrina Damario | 0 | 0^{r}
(United States) Melissa Mazzotta | 7 | 6
(Brazil) Roberta Burzagli | 5 | 1
WC | (Brazil) Bianca Catay | 3 | 6^{1}
WC | (Brazil) Ana Paula Zannoni | 6 | 7^{7}
WC | (Brazil) Renata Dias | 0 | 0
2 | (Spain) Gisela Riera | 6 | 6

Second round
6 | (Argentina) Luciana Masante | 6 | 2
(United States) Melissa Mazzotta | 0 | 1^{r}
WC | (Brazil) Ana Paula Zannoni | 6^{2} | 2
2 | (Spain) Gisela Riera | 7^{7} | 6

Qualifying competition
6 | (Argentina) Luciana Masante | 3 | 2
2 | (Spain) Gisela Riera | 6 | 6
