= 1999 Brasil Open – Doubles =

Doubles
- 1999 Brasil Open

Final
- Champions: (Argentina) Laura Montalvo (Argentina) Paola Suárez
- Runners-up: (Slovakia) Janette Husárová (Argentina) Florencia Labat
- Score: 6–7,^{(1–7)} 7–5, 7–5

Events
Singles	Doubles
- Brasil Open

The 1999 Brasil Open doubles was the tennis doubles event of the first edition of the most prestigious tournament in Brazil. Argentinian team Laura Montalvo and Paola Suárez won the title, in what was the team's second title of the year, defeating Janette Husárová and Florencia Labat in the final.

== Seeds ==
1. (Argentina) Laura Montalvo / (Argentina) Paola Suárez (champions)
2. (Netherlands) Seda Noorlander / (Austria) Patricia Wartusch (semifinals)
3. (Slovakia) Janette Husárová / (Argentina) Florencia Labat (final)
4. (Spain) Eva Bes-Ostáriz / (Spain) Gisela Riera (semifinals)

== Draw ==
Key

- Q = Qualifier
- WC = Wild card
- LL = Lucky loser
- Alt = Alternate
- ITF = ITF entry
- PR = Protected ranking
- SR = Special ranking
- SE = Special exempt
- JE = Junior exempt
- JR = Junior Accelerator Programme entrant
- CO = College Accelerator Programme entrant
- NG = Next Gen Accelerator Program entrant
- w/o = Walkover
- r = Retired
- d = Defaulted

First round
1	(Argentina) L Montalvo (Argentina) P Suárez	6	6
(United States) M Mazzotta (United States) M Shaughnessy	1	1
(Germany) A Barna (Hungary) A Hegedűs	5	6	2
(Netherlands) A Hopmans (Czech Republic) L Němečková	7	3	6
4	(Spain) E Bes-Ostáriz (Spain) G Riera	7	6
(Italy) A Serra Zanetti (Romania) A Vanc	5	2
(Spain) G León García (Spain) C Torrens Valero	6	6
(Argentina) L Masante (Spain) M Ramon Climent	2	3
Q	(Colombia) M Mesa (Argentina) R Ottoboni	6	6
(Brazil) J Cortez (Brazil) V Menga	3	0
(Italy) T Garbin (Germany) C Schneider	4	5
3	(Slovakia) J Husárová (Argentina) F Labat	6	7
(Hungary) V Csurgó (Hungary) P Mandula	7^{7}	5	4
(Spain) RM Andrés Rodríguez (Spain) C Martínez Granados	6^{3}	7	6
WC	(Brazil) M D'Agostini (Paraguay) L Schaerer	5	7^{9}	3
2	(Netherlands) S Noorlander (Austria) P Wartusch	7	6^{7}	6

Quarterfinals
1	(Argentina) L Montalvo (Argentina) P Suárez	6	3	7^{7}
(Netherlands) A Hopmans (Czech Republic) L Němečková	3	6	6^{3}
4	(Spain) E Bes-Ostáriz (Spain) G Riera	6	6
(Spain) G León García (Spain) C Torrens Valero	2	2
Q	(Colombia) M Mesa (Argentina) R Ottoboni	1	1
3	(Slovakia) J Husárová (Argentina) F Labat	6	6
(Spain) RM Andrés Rodríguez (Spain) C Martínez Granados	4	3
2	(Netherlands) S Noorlander (Austria) P Wartusch	6	6

Semifinals
1	(Argentina) L Montalvo (Argentina) P Suárez	6	6
4	(Spain) E Bes-Ostáriz (Spain) G Riera	1	2
3	(Slovakia) J Husárová (Argentina) F Labat	6	6
2	(Netherlands) S Noorlander (Austria) P Wartusch	1	3

Final
1	(Argentina) L Montalvo (Argentina) P Suárez	6^{1}	7	7
3	(Slovakia) J Husárová (Argentina) F Labat	7^{7}	5	5

== Qualifying ==
=== Seeds ===
1. (Colombia) Mariana Mesa / (Argentina) Romina Ottoboni (Qualifiers)
2. (Argentina) Mariana Díaz Oliva / (Venezuela) Milagros Sequera (qualifying competition)

=== Qualifiers ===
1. (Colombia) Mariana Mesa / (Argentina) Romina Ottoboni

== Qualifying draw ==
Key

- Q = Qualifier
- WC = Wild card
- LL = Lucky loser
- Alt = Alternate
- ITF = ITF entry
- PR = Protected ranking
- SR = Special ranking
- SE = Special exempt
- JE = Junior exempt
- JR = Junior Accelerator Programme entrant
- CO = College Accelerator Programme entrant
- NG = Next Gen Accelerator Program entrant
- w/o = Walkover
- r = Retired
- d = Defaulted

First round
(Argentina) Melisa Arévalo (Argentina) Jorgelina Torti	8
(Argentina) Paula Racedo (Brazil) Carla Tiene	3
(Brazil) Bianca Catay (Brazil) Renata Dias	8
(Brazil) Sabrina Diniz (Argentina) Patricia Migueres	6
(Argentina) Sabrina Damario (Brazil) Lisa Sendelbach	2
2	(Argentina) Mariana Díaz Oliva (Venezuela) Milagros Sequera	8

Second round
1	(Colombia) Mariana Mesa (Argentina) Romina Ottoboni	8
(Argentina) Melisa Arévalo (Argentina) Jorgelina Torti	0
(Brazil) Bianca Catay (Brazil) Renata Dias	0
2	(Argentina) Mariana Díaz Oliva (Venezuela) Milagros Sequera	8

Qualifying competition
1	(Colombia) Mariana Mesa (Argentina) Romina Ottoboni	8
2	(Argentina) Mariana Díaz Oliva (Venezuela) Milagros Sequera	2
