= Anne Mall =

American tennis player

- Country (sports): United States; Ireland
- Born: December 10, 1974 (age 51)
- Plays: Right-handed
- Prize money: $89,004

Singles
- Career record: 134–100
- Career titles: 2 ITF
- Highest ranking: No. 139 (August 29, 1994)

Grand Slam singles results
- US Open: 1R (1994)

Doubles
- Career record: 50–32
- Career titles: 7 ITF
- Highest ranking: No. 313 (March 29, 1993)

Team competitions
- Fed Cup: 3–4

Anne Mall (born December 10, 1974) is an American former professional tennis player. In Fed Cup, however, she played for Ireland.

== Biography ==
The daughter of Ben and Peggy Mall, she is originally from Libertyville, Illinois. In 1988 the family moved to Orange County, California and she attended Dana Hills High School.

Mall debuted on the WTA Tour as a 16 year old in 1991, partnering Lindsay Davenport in the doubles at San Diego. At the 1991 US Open she upset top seed Kristin Godridge in the first round of the girls' singles, en route to a spot in the final, which she lost to Czechoslovak player Karina Habšudová.

In 1993, she began touring professionally. With WTA Tour match-wins over Katrina Adams, Laura Glitz, Catalina Cristea, Audra Keller and Paola Suárez, her ranking reached a career best 139 in the world in August, 1994. She was granted a wild card into the main draw of the women's singles at the 1994 US Open and was drawn up against world number one Steffi Graf on Louis Armstrong Stadium in the opening round, losing to the German 2–6, 1–6.

Initially retiring from professional tennis in 1997, Mall studied for a degree at UCSD, before making a comeback at the age of 29. In 2004 she won five ITF doubles titles. She began representing the Ireland Fed Cup team in 2005, having qualified through her Irish born grandmother. She featured in four ties in 2005, then another two in 2008.

After retiring from tennis for a second time, Mall began a career in real estate and currently runs her own real estate brokerage in Chicago, Illinois.

== ITF finals ==
$25,000 tournaments
$10,000 tournaments

=== Singles (2–2) ===
Outcome	No.	Date	Tournament	Surface	Opponent	Score
Winner	1.	17 January 1993	Mission, United States	Hard	(United States) Elly Hakami	6–4, 7–6
Runner-up	1.	2 June 1996	El Paso, United States	Hard	(Australia) Jane Taylor	6–4, 1–6, 2–6
Winner	2.	16 June 1996	Hilton Head, United States	Hard	(South Africa) Mareze Joubert	6–4, 7–5
Runner-up	2.	27 June 2004	Edmond, United States	Hard	(India) Shikha Uberoi	2–6, 4–6

=== Doubles (7–1) ===
Outcome	No.	Date	Tournament	Surface	Partner	Opponents	Score
Winner	1.	25 January 1993	Austin, United States	Hard	(United States) Elly Hakami	(Netherlands) Annemarie Mikkers (Netherlands) Anique Snijders	6–7^{(4)}, 6–2, 6–1
Winner	2.	2 February 1997	Mission, United States	Hard	(United States) Keri Phebus	(United States) Keirsten Alley (United States) Pam Nelson	1–6, 6–1, 6–1
Runner-up	1.	1 June 1997	El Paso, United States	Hard	(Canada) Renata Kolbovic	(United States) Kaysie Smashey (United States) Sara Walker	7–6, 4–6, 0–6
Winner	3.	3 May 2004	Mérida, Mexico	Hard	(Mexico) Erika Clarke	(Argentina) Andrea Benítez (Argentina) Betina Jozami	7–5, 7–5
Winner	4.	22 May 2004	El Paso, United States	Hard	(United States) Beau Jones	(United States) Ahsha Rolle (United States) Tiya Rolle	6–1, 7–5
Winner	5.	30 May 2004	Houston, United States	Hard (i)	(Brazil) Bruna Colósio	(United States) Angela Haynes (United States) Ahsha Rolle	7–6^{(4)}, 6–4
Winner	6.	20 June 2004	Fort Worth, United States	Hard	(United States) Vania King	(United States) Neha Uberoi (India) Shikha Uberoi	2–6, 6–3, 7–6^{(5)}
Winner	7.	27 June 2004	Edmond, United States	Hard	(Canada) Heidi El Tabakh	(South Africa) Kelly Anderson (South Africa) Carine Vermeulen	3–6, 6–3, 6–4
