= Vanessa Webb =

Canadian tennis player

- Country (sports): Canada
- Residence: Mumbai, India
- Born: 24 January 1976 (age 49) Toronto, Ontario
- Height: 1.80 m (5 ft 11 in)
- Turned pro: 1992
- Retired: 2003
- Plays: Left (one-handed backhand)
- College: Duke University
- Prize money: $345,485

Singles
- Career record: 280–190
- Career titles: 10 ITF
- Highest ranking: No. 107 (7 August 2000)

Grand Slam singles results
- Australian Open: 2R (2003)
- French Open: 1R (2000)
- Wimbledon: Q3 (2000, 2001)
- US Open: 1R (1998, 2000)

Doubles
- Career record: 445–408
- Career titles: 25 ITF
- Highest ranking: No. 95 (17 July 2000)

Grand Slam doubles results
- Australian Open: 1R (2000, 2003)
- French Open: 2R (2000, 2001, 2002, 2003)
- Wimbledon: 2R (2003)
- US Open: 1R (1999, 2000)

Other doubles tournaments
- Olympic Games: 1R (2000)

Grand Slam mixed doubles results
- Wimbledon: 1R (2003)

Team competitions
- Fed Cup: 7–1

Vanessa Webb (born 24 January 1976) is a Canadian former professional tennis player. She is currently the Player Class Director for the WTA Board of Directors.

In her career, she won ten singles and 25 doubles titles on the ITF Circuit. She also reached one WTA Tour doubles final, in Kuala Lumpur in 2000.

== College ==
While at Duke, she won the Honda Sports Award as the nation's best female tennis player in 1999.

== Tennis career ==
Webb made the second round of the 2003 Australian Open which was her best Grand Slam singles performance. She also reached the first round of the French Open (in 2003) and the US Open (in 1998 & 2000). In doubles, she made the second rounds of the French Open (in 2001,'02,'03 & '04) and the Wimbledon Championships (in 2003). Webb made the first rounds of the Australian Open (in 2000,'03) and US Open (in 1999, 2000), and also the first round of mixed-doubles at the Wimbledon Championships in 2003.

== Personal life ==
After retiring from tennis, Webb has had a successful career with the Parthenon Group, a Boston-based consulting firm, working out of their branch in Mumbai, India, where she currently resides.

== WTA career finals ==
=== Doubles: 1 (runner-up) ===
Legend Grand Slam Tier I Tier II Tier III, IV & V (0–1)	Finals by surface Hard (0–1) Grass (0–0) Clay (0–0) Carpet (0–0)

Result	W–L	Date	Tournament	Tier	Surface	Partner	Opponents	Score
Loss	0–1	Nov 2000	Wismilak International, Malaysia	Tier III	Hard	(South Africa) Liezel Huber	(Slovakia) Henrieta Nagyová (Austria) Sylvia Plischke	4–6, 6–7^{(4–7)}

== ITF Circuit finals ==
=== Singles: 16 (10–6) ===
$50,000 tournaments
$25,000 tournaments
$10,000 tournaments

Result	No.	Date	Location	Surface	Opponent	Score
Loss	1.	11 July 1994	ITF Frinton, United States	Grass	(United Kingdom) Shirli-Ann Siddall	4–6, 6–7^{(5)}
Win	2.	3 June 1996	ITF Lawrenceville, United States	Hard	(Sri Lanka) Lihini Weerasuriya	6–1, 6–3
Loss	3.	24 June 1996	ITF Madison, United States	Hard	(Georgia (country)) Nino Louarsabishvili	6–1, 1–6, 2–6
Win	4.	7 July 1996	ITF Williamsburg, United States	Hard	(United States) Stephanie Mabry	6–1, 6–2
Win	5.	21 June 1998	ITF Mount Pleasant, United States	Hard	(China) Ding Ding	4–6, 7–6, 6–2
Win	6.	28 June 1998	ITF Montreal, Canada	Hard	(Canada) Renata Kolbovic	6–3, 6–4
Loss	7.	22 November 1998	ITF Port Pirie, Australia	Hard	(United States) Karin Miller	2–6, 6–7
Win	8.	21 June 1999	ITF Mount Pleasant, United States	Hard	(United States) Jennifer Hopkins	6–2, 5–7, 6–3
Win	9.	30 August 1999	ITF Huixquilucan, Mexico	Hard	(Switzerland) Miroslava Vavrinec	1–6, 6–4, 7–6
Loss	10.	4 October 1996	ITF Saga, Japan	Grass	(Thailand) Tamarine Tanasugarn	3–6, 3–6
Loss	11.	16 July 2000	ITF Winnipeg, Canada	Hard	(United States) Kristina Kraszewski	3–6, 6–3, 6–7
Win	12.	29 October 2000	ITF Seoul, South Korea	Hard	(Germany) Marlene Weingärtner	4–2, 5–3, 1–4, 5–3
Loss	13.	15 July 2001	ITF College Park, United States	Hard	(United States) Sarah Taylor	4–6, 4–6
Win	14.	20 January 2002	ITF Gainesville, United States	Hard	(United States) Tiffany Dabek	6–4, 6–0
Win	15.	8 May 2002	Fukuoka International, Japan	Grass	(South Korea) Jeon Mi-ra	6–0, 6–4
Win	16.	7 April 2003	ITF Coatzacoalcos, Mexico	Clay	(Italy) Maria Elena Camerin	6–3, 6–7, 7–6

=== Doubles: 37 (25–12) ===
Result	No.	Date	Tournament	Surface	Partner	Opponents	Score
Win	1.	30 August 1992	ITF Querétaro, Mexico	Hard	(Canada) Renata Kolbovic	(Mexico) Lucila Becerra (Mexico) Xóchitl Escobedo	6–3, 6–2
Loss	2.	6 September 1992	ITF Toluca, Mexico	Hard	(Canada) Renata Kolbovic	(Mexico) Lucila Becerra (Mexico) Xóchitl Escobedo	6–7, 7–6, 5–7
Loss	3.	16 May 1993	ITF León, Mexico	Clay	(Canada) Renata Kolbovic	(Canada) Mélanie Bernard (Canada) Caroline Delisle	6–3, 3–6, 1–6
Loss	4.	26 June 1993	ITF Roanoke, United States	Hard	(South Africa) Mareze Joubert	(Japan) Ai Sugiyama (Japan) Yoshiko Sasano	4–6, 3–6
Win	5.	2 August 1993	ITF Norfolk, United States	Hard	(United States) Sandy Sureephong	(Australia) Maija Avotins (Australia) Lisa McShea	7–6, 6–4
Win	6.	18 October 1993	ITF Sedona, United States	Hard	(United States) Sandy Sureephong	(United States) Jessica Emmons (United States) Caroline Kuhlman	6–4, 7–6^{(5)}
Win	7.	15 November 1993	ITF Port Pirie, Australia	Hard	(Australia) Lisa McShea	(Slovenia) Tina Križan (Czech Republic) Eva Martincová	7–6^{(5)}, 6–3
Loss	8.	10 October 1994	ITF Sedona, United States	Hard	(United States) Sandy Sureephong	(United States) Shannan McCarthy (United States) Julie Steven	3–6, 3–6
Win	9.	12 December 1994	ITF Mildura, France	Grass	(France) Catherine Tanvier	(Australia) Catherine Barclay (Australia) Louise Pleming	7–6^{(4)}, 4–6, 6–3
Loss	10.	24 July 1995	ITF Salisbury, United States	Hard	(United States) Sandy Sureephong	(United States) Shannan McCarthy (United States) Julie Steven	3–6, 2–6
Win	11.	9 June 1996	ITF Lawrenceville, United States	Hard	(United States) Amanda Augustus	(United States) Rebecca Jensen (United States) Kristine Kurth	7–6^{(5)}, 3–6, 6–4
Win	12.	30 June 1996	ITF Mahwah, United States	Hard	(United States) Amanda Augustus	(United States) Jackie Moe (United States) Vickie Paynter	6–2, 6–4
Loss	13.	19 January 1997	ITF Delray Beach, United States	Hard	(United States) Pam Nelson	(United States) Rebecca Jensen (United States) Keri Phebus	7–6^{(4)}, 2–6, 2–6
Win	14.	9 June 1997	ITF Hilton Head, United States	Hard	(United States) Sandy Sureephong	(New Zealand) Nicola Kaiwai (New Zealand) Gaye McManus	6–1, 6–3
Win	15.	14 June 1998	ITF Hilton Head, United States	Hard	(United States) Sandy Sureephong	(United States) Holly Parkinson (United States) Tracy Almeda-Singian	6–2, 7–6^{(4)}
Win	16.	21 June 1998	ITF Mount Pleasant, United States	Hard	(United States) Keri Phebus	(United States) Adria Engel (Mexico) Karin Palme	6–2, 6–1
Win	17.	28 June 1998	ITF Montreal, Canada	Hard	(Canada) Renata Kolbovic	(Canada) Mélanie Marois (Canada) Katherine Rammo	6–3, 6–1
Loss	18.	26 July 1998	ITF Peachtree City, United States	Hard	(United States) Keri Phebus	(United Kingdom) Julie Pullin (United Kingdom) Lorna Woodroffe	6–3, 2–6, 4–6
Win	19.	2 August 1998	ITF Winnipeg, Canada	Hard	(United States) Keri Phebus	(Canada) Renata Kolbovic (United Kingdom) Julie Pullin	4–6, 6–4, 7–6
Loss	20.	15 November 1998	Bendigo International, Australia	Hard	(United States) Dawn Buth	(Australia) Catherine Barclay (Australia) Kerry-Anne Guse	7–6, 3–6, 1–6
Win	21.	29 November 1998	ITF Nuriootpa, Australia	Hard	(Australia) Danielle Jones	(Australia) Catherine Barclay (Australia) Trudi Musgrave	6–3, 7–5
Win	22.	7 June 1999	ITF Hilton Head, United States	Hard	(United States) Dawn Buth	(United States) Wendy Fix (United States) Lindsay Lee-Waters	6–2, 4–6, 6–3
Win	23.	11 July 1999	ITF Edmonton, Canada	Hard	(United States) Dawn Buth	(Germany) Kirstin Freye (Canada) Renata Kolbovic	6–3, 6–2
Win	24.	18 July 1999	ITF Mahwah, United States	Hard	(United States) Dawn Buth	(United States) Sandra Cacic (United States) Karin Miller	6–4, 6–3
Win	25.	9 October 1999	ITF Saga, Japan	Grass	(Australia) Catherine Barclay	(South Korea) Kim Eun-ha (Slovenia) Petra Rampre	6–7, 6–3, 6–2
Win	26.	9 July 2000	ITF Los Gatos, United States	Hard	(Chinese Taipei) Janet Lee	(United States) Sandra Cacic (Canada) Renata Kolbovic	6–4, 6–1
Win	27.	16 July 2000	ITF Winnipeg, Canada	Hard	(Canada) Renata Kolbovic	(Germany) Kirstin Freye (Hong Kong) Tong Ka-po	6–1, 6–4
Win	28.	8 July 2001	ITF Los Gatos, United States	Hard	(United States) Dawn Buth	(Japan) Ryoko Takemura (Japan) Yuka Yoshida	6–2, 7–6
Loss	29.	15 July 2001	ITF College Park, United States	Hard	(United States) Dawn Buth	(Japan) Nana Miyagi (Australia) Lisa McShea	1–6, 4–6
Loss	30.	22 July 2001	ITF Mahwah, United States	Hard	(United States) Dawn Buth	(Japan) Nana Miyagi (Australia) Lisa McShea	1–6, 6–3, 2–6
Loss	31.	4 August 2001	Vancouver Open, Canada	Hard	(Slovenia) Petra Rampre	(United States) Erika deLone (Canada) Renata Kolbovic	6–2, 4–6, 4–6
Winner	32.	8 January 2002	ITF Tallahassee, United States	Hard	(United States) Jessica Lehnhoff	(Croatia) Ivana Abramović (United States) Jacqueline Trail	6–4, 6–3
Win	33.	20 January 2002	ITF Gainesville, United States	Hard	(Slovenia) Petra Rampre	(United States) Beau Jones (Latvia) Anžela Žguna	6–3, 5–7, 6–4
Win	34.	13 May 2002	ITF Szczecin, Poland	Clay	(Venezuela) Milagros Sequera	(Czech Republic) Olga Vymetálková (Czech Republic) Gabriela Chmelinová	6–7^{(5)}, 7–5, 6–3
Win	35.	7 July 2002	ITF Los Gatos, United States	Hard	(Canada) Teryn Ashley	(Japan) Ryoko Takemura (Japan) Yuka Yoshida	6–3, 6–4
Win	36.	8 October 2002	ITF Cardiff, United Kingdom	Hard (i)	(France) Marion Bartoli	(Argentina) Mariana Díaz Oliva (United Kingdom) Julie Pullin	6–4, 6–2
Loss	37.	11 November 2002	ITF Mexico City	Clay	(Slovenia) Tina Hergold	(Czech Republic) Olga Vymetálková (Czech Republic) Gabriela Chmelinová	6–3, 3–6, 4–6
