= Keri Phebus =

American tennis player

- Country (sports): United States
- Born: May 1, 1974 (age 52)
- College: UCLA
- Prize money: $46,895

Singles
- Career record: 54–53
- Career titles: 0 WTA, 1 ITF
- Highest ranking: No. 186 (December 8, 1997)

Doubles
- Career record: 39–32
- Career titles: 0 WTA, 4 ITF
- Highest ranking: 147 (January 5, 1998)
- Last updated on: June 13, 2016.

Keri Phebus (born May 1, 1974) is a professional tennis player from the United States. During her pro career from 1991 to 1998, she won five titles on the ITF Women's Circuit, received a wildcard entry and won her first round match at the 1995 US Open. Phebus is the most decorated player in the history of UCLA women's tennis.

== Early career ==
While a student at Corona del Mar High School, Phebus was the nation's top-ranked girl in juniors for multiple seasons.

== College ==
While at UCLA, she won the Honda Sports Award as the nation's best female tennis player in 1995. In 1995, she was the first UCLA player ever to win the national singles championship and became the second woman in history to win both the NCAA singles and doubles titles in the same year. Phebus was the first women's tennis player inducted into the UCLA Athletics Hall of Fame. No other player has been so decorated in the history of women's tennis at UCLA.

== Professional career ==
In professional tennis, on December 8, 1997, Phebus reached her highest singles ranking: world number 186. Her highest doubles ranking came on January 5, 1998, when she became world number 147. In her career, she won US $46,895.

=== ITF Women's Singles ===
Phebus defeated Sweden's Kristina Triska to win the singles title at the ITF $25,000 Woodlands, Texas, on March 23, 1997.

=== ITF Women's Doubles ===
In 1997, Phebus partnered with Anne Mall to win the doubles title at the ITF $25,000 Mission, Texas tournament.

In June 1998, at the ITF $25,000 Mount Pleasant, South Carolina, Phebus partnered with Canadian Vanessa Webb to win the doubles title. The pair were runners-up at July's ITF $25,000 tournament in Peachtree, Georgia. The following week, they won the doubles title at the ITF $25,000 Winnipeg.

== ITF Circuit finals ==
$100,000 tournaments
$75,000 tournaments
$50,000 tournaments
$25,000 tournaments
$10,000 tournaments

=== Singles finals ===
Result	Date	Tournament	Surface	Opponent	Score
Runner-up	February 2, 1997	Mission, United States	Hard (O)	(Zimbabwe) Cara Black	3–6, 3–6
Winner	March 23, 1997	Woodlands, United States	Hard (O)	(Sweden) Kristina Triska	6–1, 7–5

=== Doubles finals ===
Result	Date	Tournament	Surface	Partner	Opponents	Score
Winner	January 19, 1997	Delray Beach, United States	Hard (O)	(United States) Rebecca Jensen	(United States) Pam Nelson (Canada) Vanessa Webb	6–7, 6–2, 6–2
Winner	February 2, 1997	Mission, United States	Hard (O)	(United States) Anne Mall	(United States) Keirsten Alley (United States) Pam Nelson	1–6, 6–1, 6–1
Runner-up	July 6, 1997	Flushing, United States	Hard (O)	(China) Fang Li	(United States) Janet Lee (United States) Lindsay Lee	2–6, 6–2, 3–6
Runner-up	January 18, 1998	Delray Beach, United States	Hard (O)	(United States) Jean Okada	(Canada) Maureen Drake (Canada) Renata Kolbovic	6–7, 4–6
Winner	June 21, 1998	Mount Pleasant, United States	Hard (O)	(Canada) Vanessa Webb	(United States) Adria Engel (Mexico) Karin Palme	6–2, 6–1
Runner-up	July 26, 1998	Peachtree City, United States	Hard (O)	(Canada) Vanessa Webb	(United Kingdom) Julie Pullin (United Kingdom) Lorna Woodroffe	6–3, 2–6, 4–6
Winner	August 2, 1998	Winnipeg, Canada	Hard (O)	(Canada) Vanessa Webb	(Canada) Renata Kolbovic (United Kingdom) Julie Pullin	4–6, 6–4, 7–6

== Personal life ==
Phebus is married to Steve Olsen, has three children, and lives in California. After her playing days she became a school teacher for several years, but has taught tennis at "The Edge Tennis Academy" in Newport Beach since 2013.
