= Nóra Köves =

Hungarian tennis player

- Country (sports): Hungary
- Born: 13 June 1971 (age 53); Hungary
- Prize money: $56,769

Singles
- Career record: 91–78
- Career titles: 4 ITF
- Highest ranking: No. 181 (24 May 1999)

Grand Slam singles results
- Australian Open: Q1 (1999)
- Wimbledon: Q1 (1999)
- US Open: Q2 (1998)

Doubles
- Career record: 92–67
- Career titles: 10 ITF
- Highest ranking: No. 138 (7 June 1999)

Grand Slam doubles results
- Wimbledon: Q1 (1999)
- US Open: 2R (1994)

Nóra Köves (born 13 June 1971) is a former Hungarian tennis player. She won a total of four singles and ten doubles ITF titles during her career and on 24 May 1999 peaked at No. 181 in the singles rankings. On 7 June 1999, Köves achieved a career-high doubles ranking of world No. 138.

Partnering Rebecca Jensen, Köves reached the second round of the 1994 US Open women's doubles tournament.

== ITF Circuit finals ==
=== Singles (4–3) ===
Legend $50,000 tournaments $25,000 tournaments $10,000 tournaments	Finals by surface Hard (3–1) Clay (1–0) Carpet (0–2)

Result	No.	Date	Tournament	Surface	Opponent	Score
Loss	1.	27 November 1989	ITF Budapest, Hungary	Carpet (i)	(Czechoslovakia) Karina Habšudová	4–6, 1–6
Win	1.	30 September 1996	ITF Thessaloniki, Greece	Hard	(Greece) Eleni Daniilidou	6–3, 6–2
Loss	2.	9 December 1996	ITF Přerov, Czech Republic	Carpet (i)	(Czech Republic) Květa Hrdličková	2–6, 3–6
Loss	3.	24 February 1997	ITF Jaffa, Israel	Hard	(Israel) Tzipora Obziler	5–7, 4–6
Win	2.	16 June 1997	ITF Tallinn, Estonia	Hard	(Russia) Elena Voropaeva	6–1, 6–2
Win	3.	23 June 1997	ITF Båstad 2, Sweden	Clay	(Sweden) Annica Lindstedt	4–6, 7–6^{(7–4)}, 6–2
Win	4.	1 February 1999	ITF Wellington, New Zealand	Hard	(South Africa) Natalie Grandin	6–2, 6–2

=== Doubles (10–13) ===
Legend $50,000 tournaments $25,000 tournaments $10,000 tournaments	Finals by surface Hard (4–4) Clay (6–8) Carpet (0–1)

Result	No.	Date	Tournament	Surface	Partner	Opponents	Score
Loss	1.	20 June 1988	ITF Bad Gastein, Austria	Clay	(Romania) Florentina Curpene	(West Germany) Aurelia Gheorghe (South Africa) Nelia Kruger	4–6, 6–7
Loss	2.	1 May 1989	ITF Sezze, Italy	Clay	(Hungary) Virág Csurgó	(Denmark) Henriette Kjær Nielsen (Switzerland) Natalie Tschan	0–6, 6–3, 3–6
Loss	3.	8 May 1989	ITF Schwarzach, Austria	Clay	(Hungary) Virág Csurgó	(Netherlands) Esmir Hoogendoorn (West Germany) Stefanie Rehmke	w/o
Loss	4.	9 July 1990	ITF Subiaco, Italy	Clay	(Hungary) Virág Csurgó	(United States) Kylie Johnson (Socialist Federal Republic of Yugoslavia) Barbara Mulej	6–7, 0–6
Win	1.	6 November 1995	ITF Santo Domingo, Dominican Republic	Clay	(United States) Rebecca Jensen	(United States) Keirsten Alley (United States) Angela Bernal	2–6, 6–1, 6–3
Win	2.	8 January 1996	ITF San Antonio, United States	Hard	(United States) Pam Nelson	(Japan) Saori Obata (Japan) Nami Urabe	2–6, 6–4, 6–1
Win	3.	15 January 1996	ITF The Woodlands, United States	Hard	(United States) Kelly Pace	(United States) Erica Adams (United States) Claire Sessions Bailey	7–5, 4–6, 6–2
Win	4.	10 June 1996	ITF Budapest, Hungary	Clay	(Hungary) Virág Csurgó	(Spain) Ángeles Montolio (Colombia) Fabiola Zuluaga	5–7, 7–5, 6–2
Loss	5.	7 October 1996	ITF Nicosia, Cyprus	Clay	(Hungary) Andrea Noszály	(Czech Republic) Petra Kučová (Czech Republic) Blanka Kumbárová	5–7, 2–6
Loss	6.	28 October 1996	ITF Curaçao, Netherlands Antilles	Hard	(United Kingdom) Joanne Moore	(United States) Keirsten Alley (United States) Jackie Moe	1–6, 6–3, 4–6
Win	5.	11 November 1996	ITF San Salvador 2, El Salvador	Clay	(United Kingdom) Joanne Moore	(Indonesia) Liza Andriyani (Colombia) Giana Gutiérrez	2–6, 7–5, 7–6^{(7–1)}
Loss	7.	3 February 1997	ITF Reykjavík, Iceland	Carpet (i)	(Hungary) Adrienn Hegedűs	(Finland) Linda Jansson (Sweden) Annica Lindstedt	6–4, 1–6, 2–6
Loss	8.	24 February 1997	ITF Jaffa, Israel	Hard	(Slovakia) Patrícia Marková	(Czech Republic) Milena Nekvapilová (Czech Republic) Hana Šromová	4–6, 2–6
Loss	9.	31 March 1997	ITF Makarska 1, Croatia	Clay	(Czech Republic) Helena Vildová	(Russia) Evgenia Kulikovskaya (Germany) Caroline Schneider	1–6, 6–4, 4–6
Win	6.	19 May 1997	ITF Zaragoza, Spain	Clay	(Netherlands) Kim de Weille	(Spain) Eva Bes (Spain) Lourdes Domínguez Lino	7–6^{(7–4)}, 6–4
Loss	10.	16 June 1997	ITF Tallinn, Estonia	Hard	(Finland) Kirsi Lampinen	(Germany) Magdalena Kučerová (Germany) Gabriela Kučerová	4–6, 1–6
Loss	11.	6 October 1997	ITF Thessaloniki, Greece	Hard	(Hungary) Adrienn Hegedűs	(Italy) Katia Altilia (Denmark) Charlotte Aagaard	6–7^{(5–7)}, 1–6
Win	7.	6 July 1998	ITF Puchheim, Germany	Clay	(Hungary) Virág Csurgó	(Germany) Silke Meier (Germany) Jasmin Wöhr	4–6, 6–0, 6–3
Loss	12.	13 July 1998	ITF Darmstadt, Germany	Clay	(Hungary) Virág Csurgó	(Belgium) Laurence Courtois (France) Noëlle van Lottum	5–7, 2–6
Loss	13.	14 September 1998	ITF Otočec, Slovenia	Clay	(Serbia and Montenegro) Dragana Zarić	(Slovenia) Katarina Srebotnik (Germany) Jasmin Wöhr	2–6, 3–6
Win	8.	15 February 1999	ITF Redbridge, United Kingdom	Hard (i)	(Serbia and Montenegro) Dragana Zarić	(Czech Republic) Lenka Němečková (Austria) Patricia Wartusch	6–1, 6–4
Win	9.	1 March 1999	ITF Biel 1, Switzerland	Hard (i)	(Serbia and Montenegro) Dragana Zarić	(Switzerland) Laura Bao (Switzerland) Marylene Losey	6–2, 6–2
Win	10.	8 May 2000	ITF Swansea, United Kingdom	Clay	(Serbia and Montenegro) Dragana Zarić	(Russia) Natalia Egorova (Russia) Ekaterina Sysoeva	2–6, 6–4, 6–3
