= Kristine Kurth =

American tennis player

- Country (sports): United States
- Born: June 23, 1972 (age 52)
- Plays: Right-handed
- Prize money: $33,152

Singles
- Career record: 79–91
- Career titles: 1 ITF
- Highest ranking: No. 290 (May 5, 1997)

Doubles
- Career record: 55–59
- Career titles: 5 ITF
- Highest ranking: No. 180 (May 26, 1997)

Kristine Kurth (born June 23, 1972) is an American former professional tennis player. She played college tennis for William & Mary and Stanford.

Kurth, a right-handed player from New York, competed on the professional tour during the 1990s, reaching career best rankings of 290 in singles and 180 in doubles. She made her WTA Tour main draw debut in the doubles at Nagoya in 1995 and the following year qualified for the doubles main draw in Quebec.

== ITF finals ==
=== Singles: 6 (1–5) ===
Result	No.	Date	Tournament	Surface	Opponent	Score
Win	1.	July 28, 1991	Roanoke, United States	Hard	(United States) Paloma Collantes	6–3, 6–3
Loss	1.	August 11, 1991	College Park, United States	Hard	(Australia) Louise Stacey	0–6, 2–6
Loss	2.	November 20, 1994	San Salvador, El Salvador	Hard	(Chile) Paula Cabezas	2–6, 2–6
Loss	3.	May 12, 1996	Amazonas, Brazil	Hard	(Austria) Patricia Wartusch	3–6, 6–7^{(10)}
Loss	4.	August 18, 1996	Guayaquil, Ecuador	Clay	(Argentina) Celeste Contín	3–6, 2–6
Loss	5.	September 1, 1996	San Salvador, El Salvador	Clay	(United Kingdom) Joanne Moore	6–2, 4–6, 3–6

=== Doubles: 8 (5–3) ===
Result	No.	Date	Tournament	Surface	Partner	Opponents	Score
Win	1.	August 29. 1994	London, United Kingdom	Grass	(Germany) Sabine Gerke	(Finland) Linda Jansson (Sweden) Anna-Karin Svensson	6–4, 6–4
Win	2.	April 9, 1995	Puerto Vallarta, Mexico	Hard	(United States) Jeri Ingram	(United States) Jennifer Callen (United States) Meredith Geiger	6–0, 7–6^{(0)}
Win	3.	April 23, 1995	Caracas, Venezuela	Hard	(United States) Alix Creek	(Venezuela) María Virginia Francesa (Venezuela) Ninfa Marra	6–2, 2–6, 6–0
Win	4.	June 2, 1996	El Paso, United States	Hard	(United States) Rebecca Jensen	(United States) Kaysie Smashey (United States) Sara Walker	6–4, 6–4
Loss	1.	June 9, 1996	Lawrenceville, United States	Hard	(United States) Rebecca Jensen	(Canada) Vanessa Webb (United States) Amanda Augustus	6–7, 6–3, 4–6
Loss	2.	August 12, 1996	Guayaquil, Ecuador	Clay	(United Kingdom) Joanne Moore	(Argentina) Mariana Lopez Palacios (Argentina) Paula Racedo	2–6, 7–5, 5–7
Win	5.	August 19, 1996	Lima, Peru	Clay	(United Kingdom) Joanne Moore	(Argentina) Mariana Lopez Palacios (Argentina) Paula Racedo	6–2, 3–6, 6–2
Loss	3.	August 26, 1996	San Salvador, El Salvador	Clay	(United Kingdom) Joanne Moore	(Ecuador) Nuria Niemes (Mexico) Graciela Vélez	5–7, 6–1, 1–6
