= Keirsten Alley =

American tennis player

- Country (sports): United States
- Born: September 17, 1973 (age 51)
- Prize money: $18,486

Singles
- Career titles: 2 ITF
- Highest ranking: No. 276 (July 14, 1997)

Doubles
- Career titles: 3 ITF
- Highest ranking: No. 168 (July 28, 1997)

Keirsten Alley (born September 17, 1973) is an American former professional tennis player.

Alley, who comes from Melrose, Massachusetts, played college tennis for UC Berkeley. A four-time All-American, she won two Pac-10 doubles championships partnering Pam Nelson and with the same player was an NCAA doubles semi-finalist in 1995.

From 1995 to 1997, Alley competed on the professional tour and reached a best singles ranking of 276, winning ITF titles in Curaçao and Santo Domingo. As a doubles player she made a WTA Tour main draw appearance at the 1997 Stanford Classic with Laxmi Poruri.

== ITF finals ==
$25,000 tournaments
$10,000 tournaments

=== Singles: 5 (2–3) ===
Result	No.	Date	Tournament	Surface	Opponent	Score
Win	1.	October 28, 1996	Curaçao, Netherlands Antilles	Hard	(Canada) Aneta Soukup	6–3, 6–4
Win	2.	November 4, 1996	Santo Domingo, Dominican Republic	Clay	(United Kingdom) Joanne Moore	6–4, 6–0
Loss	1.	November 25, 1996	São Paulo, Brazil	Hard	(Hungary) Katalin Marosi	7–6^{(2)}, 3–6, 4–6
Loss	2.	December 2, 1996	São Paulo, Brazil	Hard	(Hungary) Katalin Marosi	3–6, 1–6
Loss	3.	April 21, 1997	Guimarães, Portugal	Hard	(Portugal) Sofia Prazeres	3–6, 1–6

=== Doubles: 9 (3–6) ===
Result	No.	Date	Tournament	Surface	Partner	Opponents	Score
Loss	1.	November 6, 1995	Santo Domingo, Dominican Republic	Clay	(United States) Angela Bernal	(Hungary) Nóra Köves (United States) Rebecca Jensen	6–2, 1–6, 3–6
Loss	2.	November 13, 1995	San Salvador, El Salvador	Clay	(United States) Angela Bernal	(Germany) Nina Nittinger (United Kingdom) Joanne Moore	3–6, 6–3, 3–6
Win	1.	April 1, 1996	Moulins, France	Hard	(United States) Jackie Moe	(France) Laurence Bois (Italy) Emanuela Brusati	6–2, 7–5
Win	2.	October 28, 1996	Curaçao, Netherlands Antilles	Hard	(United States) Jackie Moe	(Hungary) Nóra Köves (United Kingdom) Joanne Moore	6–1, 3–6, 6–4
Loss	3.	December 9, 1996	São Paulo, Brazil	Clay	(United States) Paige Yaroshuk	(Hungary) Katalin Marosi (Argentina) Florencia Cianfagna	4–6, 7–6^{(4)}, 3–6
Loss	4.	January 20, 1997	San Antonio, United States	Hard	(United States) Pam Nelson	(United States) Jane Chi (United States) Kelly Pace	4–6, 6–4, 4–6
Loss	5.	February 2, 1997	Mission, United States	Hard	(United States) Pam Nelson	(United States) Keri Phebus (United States) Anne Mall	6–1, 1–6, 1–6
Win	3.	June 16, 1997	Mount Pleasant, United States	Hard	(Indonesia) Liza Andriyani	(United States) Amanda Augustus (Norway) Tina Samara	2–6, 6–3, 6–4
Loss	6.	June 23, 1997	Greenwood, United States	Hard	(Norway) Tina Samara	(Australia) Melissa Beadman (Australia) Amy Jensen	6–4, 2–6, 4–6
