= Joanne Moore =

British-born tennis coach and player

- Full name: Joanne Moore Wallen
- Country (sports): Great Britain
- Born: 9 March 1976 (age 49) Birmingham, England
- Prize money: $82,147

Singles
- Highest ranking: No. 252 (23 April 2001)

Doubles
- Highest ranking: No. 179 (21 July 1997)

Grand Slam doubles results
- Wimbledon: 1R (1995)

Grand Slam mixed doubles results
- Wimbledon: 1R (1998)

Joanne Wallen (born 9 March 1976) is a British born tennis coach and former professional player based in the United States. While competing on tour she was known as Joanne Moore.

== Tennis career ==
Born in the English city of Birmingham, Moore moved to the United States for training as a junior.

Making her WTA Tour debut as a 15 year old at the 1991 Virginia Slims of Philadelphia, she went on to reach a best ranking of 252 in singles and 179 in doubles.

During her career she twice featured in the main draw at Wimbledon, in the women's doubles with Emily Bond in 1995 and mixed doubles partnering Luke Milligan in 1998.

== Coaching ==
Subsequently known as Joanne Wallen, she has worked as a coach for the United States Tennis Association (USTA). She currently works as the Senior Director of the USTA National Campus in Orlando, FL.

Since 2016 she has served as the Director of Adult Individual Play and Wheelchair Tennis.

== ITF finals ==
=== Singles: 6 (3-3) ===
Legend
$25,000 tournaments
$10,000 tournaments

Result	No.	Date	Tournament	Surface	Opponent	Score
Loss	1.	26 September 1994	Lima, Peru	Hard	(Paraguay) Magalí Benítez	4–6, 6–3, 1–6
Loss	2.	28 August 1995	San Salvador, El Salvador	Clay	(United Kingdom) Rachel Viollet	3–6, 0–6
Win	3.	13 November 1995	San Salvador, El Salvador	Clay	(Sweden) Kristina Triska	6–3, 6–2
Win	4.	26 August 1996	San Salvador, El Salvador	Clay	(United States) Kristine Kurth	2–6, 6–4, 6–3
Loss	5.	4 November 1996	Santo Domingo, Dominican Republic	Clay	(United States) Keirsten Alley	4–6, 0–6
Win	6.	8 November 1999	San Salvador, El Salvador	Clay	(Switzerland) Aliénor Tricerri	4–6, 6–4, 7–5

=== Doubles: 20 (11–9) ===
Result	No.	Date	Tournament	Surface	Partner	Opponents	Score
Win	1.	1 November 1993	Freeport, Bahamas	Hard	(Brazil) Christina Rozwadowski	(Ecuador) María Dolores Campana (Japan) Kiyoko Yazawa	w/o
Win	2.	15 November 1993	San Salvador, El Salvador	Hard	(Ecuador) María Dolores Campana	(Colombia) Carmiña Giraldo (Colombia) Ximena Rodríguez	6–3, 6–4
Loss	3.	13 February 1995	Bogotá, Colombia	Clay	(Colombia) Ximena Rodríguez	(Argentina) María José Gaidano (Brazil) Andrea Vieira	4–6, 6–1, 1–6
Win	4.	27 February 1995	Cartagena, Colombia	Hard	(Colombia) Ximena Rodríguez	(Belgium) Caroline Bodart (Brazil) Patrícia Segala	6–1, 6–2
Loss	5.	4 September 1995	Medellín, Colombia	Clay	(Colombia) Ximena Rodríguez	(Argentina) Mariana Díaz Oliva (Brazil) Eugenia Maia	3–6, 2–6
Win	6.	11 September 1995	Bucaramanga, Colombia	Clay	(Colombia) Ximena Rodríguez	(Colombia) Carmiña Giraldo (Colombia) Mariana Mesa	7–5, 4–6, 6–4
Loss	7.	18 September 1995	Manizales, Colombia	Clay	(Colombia) Ximena Rodríguez	(Argentina) Mariana Díaz Oliva (Brazil) Eugenia Maia	4–6, 3–6
Win	8.	13 November 1995	San Salvador, El Salvador	Clay	(Germany) Nina Nittinger	(United States) Keirsten Alley (United States) Angela Bernal	6–3, 3–6, 6–3
Loss	9.	12 August 1996	Guayaquil, Ecuador	Clay	(United States) Kristine Kurth	(Argentina) Mariana Lopez Palacios (Argentina) Paula Racedo	2–6, 7–5, 5–7
Win	10.	19 August 1996	Lima, Peru	Clay	(United States) Kristine Kurth	(Argentina) Mariana Lopez Palacios (Argentina) Paula Racedo	6–2, 3–6, 6–2
Loss	11.	26 August 1996	San Salvador, El Salvador	Clay	(United States) Kristine Kurth	(Ecuador) Nuria Niemes (Mexico) Graciela Vélez	5–7, 6–1, 1–6
Loss	12.	30 September 1996	Bogotá, Colombia	Clay	(Colombia) Carmiña Giraldo	(Colombia) Giana Gutiérrez (Argentina) Romina Ottoboni	6–1, 3–6, 1–6
Loss	13.	28 October 1996	Curaçao, Netherlands Antilles	Hard	(Hungary) Nóra Köves	(United States) Keirsten Alley (United States) Jackie Moe	1–6, 6–3, 4–6
Win	14.	11 November 1996	San Salvador, El Salvador	Clay	(Hungary) Nóra Köves	(Indonesia) Liza Andriyani (Colombia) Giana Gutiérrez	2–6, 7–5, 7–6^{(7–1)}
Win	15.	23 June 1997	Manaus, Brazil	Hard	(Colombia) Ximena Rodríguez	(Germany) Caroline Germar (Republic of Ireland) Kelly Liggan	6–0, 6–2
Loss	16.	17 November 1997	Caracas, Venezuela	Hard	(United States) Rebecca Jensen	(United States) Wendy Fix (United States) Katie Schlukebir	6–7^{(6–8)}, 6–4, 5–7
Win	17.	17 August 1998	Ibarra, Ecuador	Clay	(Chile) Paula Cabezas	(Uruguay) Elena Juricich (Peru) María Eugenia Rojas	6–3, 6–4
Loss	18.	6 September 1998	Manaus, Brazil	Hard	(Argentina) María José Gaidano	(Brazil) Bruna Colósio (Brazil) Carla Tiene	6–3, 3–6, 4–6
Win	19	9 November 1998	San Salvador, El Salvador	Clay	(Spain) Alicia Ortuño	(United States) Susie Starrett (Switzerland) Aliénor Tricerri	6–3, 3–6, 6–1
Win	20.	8 November 1999	San Salvador, El Salvador	Clay	(Switzerland) Aliénor Tricerri	(Uruguay) Elena Juricich (Venezuela) Stephanie Schaer	7–5, 2–1 ret.
