= 1999 Brasil Open =

- Date: October 4–10
- Category: Tier IV
- Surface: Clay (red) / outdoor
- Location: São Paulo, Brazil

Champions

Singles
- (Colombia) Fabiola Zuluaga

Doubles
- (Argentina) Laura Montalvo / (Argentina) Paola Suárez
- WTA Brasil Open

The 1999 Brasil Open was a women's tennis tournament played on outdoor clay courts in São Paulo, Brazil. It was part of Tier IV of the 1999 WTA Tour. The tournament was held from October 4 through October 10, 1999. Fabiola Zuluaga won the singles title.

== Finals ==
=== Singles ===
(Colombia) Fabiola Zuluaga defeated (Austria) Patricia Wartusch, 7–5, 4–6, 7–5

- This was Zuluaga's second WTA title of the year and her career.

=== Doubles ===
(Argentina) Laura Montalvo / (Argentina) Paola Suárez defeated (Slovakia) Janette Husárová / (Argentina) Florencia Labat, 6–7^{(7–9)}, 7–5, 7–5

== Entrants ==
=== Seeds ===
Country	Player	Rank	Seed
ISR	Anna Smashnova	46	1
ESP	Cristina Torrens Valero	51	2
COL	Fabiola Zuluaga	52	3
ESP	Gala León García	54	4
ARG	Paola Suárez	57	5
NED	Amanda Hopmans	87	6
HUN	Rita Kuti-Kis	90	7
NED	Seda Noorlander	94	8

=== Other entrants ===
The following players received wildcards into the singles main draw:

- (Brazil) Joana Cortez
- (Brazil) Vanessa Menga

The following players received wildcards into the doubles main draw:

- (Brazil) Miriam D'Agostini / (Paraguay) Larissa Schaerer

The following players received entry from the singles qualifying draw:

- (Spain) Gisela Riera
- (Colombia) Mariana Mesa
- (Paraguay) Rossana de los Ríos
- (Spain) Ainhoa Goñi Blanco

The following players received entry from the doubles qualifying draw:

- (Colombia) Mariana Mesa / (Argentina) Romina Ottoboni
