= Natalia Gussoni =

Argentine tennis player

- Country (sports): Argentina
- Born: 24 August 1981 (age 43)
- Turned pro: 1996
- Retired: 2008
- Plays: Right-handed (two-handed backhand)
- Prize money: $147,093

Singles
- Career record: 239–148
- Career titles: 7 ITF
- Highest ranking: No. 134 (3 May 2004)

Grand Slam singles results
- Australian Open: Q3 (2004)
- French Open: 1R (2003)
- Wimbledon: Q2 (2004)
- US Open: Q1 (2003, 2004)

Doubles
- Career record: 100–94
- Career titles: 3 ITF
- Highest ranking: No. 220 (5 July 2004)

Natalia Gussoni (born 24 August 1981) is a retired Argentine tennis player.

Gussoni has career-high WTA rankings of 134 in singles, achieved on 3 May 2004, and 220 in doubles, reached on 5 July 2004. She won seven singles and three doubles titles on the ITF Circuit.

Playing for Argentina in Fed Cup competitions, Gussoni has a win–loss record of 3–3.

== ITF Circuit finals ==
$100,000 tournaments
$75,000 tournaments
$50,000 tournaments
$25,000 tournaments
$10,000 tournaments

=== Singles: 15 (7 titles, 8 runner-ups) ===
Result	No.	Date	Tournament	Surface	Opponent	Score
Loss	1.	9 November 1997	ITF Guayaquil, Ecuador	Clay	(Argentina) Melisa Arévalo	6–3, 3–6, 3–6
Win	1.	1 May 2000	ITF Bari, Italy	Clay	(Italy) Valentina Sassi	0–6, 6–4, 6–2
Win	2.	4 September 2000	ITF Buenos Aires, Argentina	Clay	(Argentina) Romina Ottoboni	7–5, 6–1
Loss	2.	11 September 2000	ITF Buenos Aires, Argentina	Clay	(Argentina) Romina Ottoboni	3–6, 0–6
Win	3.	19 August 2001	ITF Paraná, Argentina	Clay	(Argentina) Melisa Arévalo	6–4, 6–0
Loss	3.	27 August 2001	ITF Asunción, Paraguay	Clay	(Argentina) Sabrina Eisenberg	w/o
Win	4.	13 May 2002	ITF Casale Monferrato, Italy	Clay	(France) Stéphanie Rizzi	6–4, 6–3
Win	5.	27 May 2002	ITF Campobasso, Italy	Clay	(France) Stéphanie Rizzi	6–1, 6–1
Loss	4.	5 August 2002	ITF Hechingen, Germany	Clay	(Germany) Sandra Klösel	3–6, 0–6
Win	6.	12 August 2002	ITF Aosta, Italy	Clay	(Czech Republic) Petra Cetkovská	6–0, 6–2
Loss	5.	20 April 2003	ITF Biarritz, France	Clay	(Czech Republic) Zuzana Ondrášková	0–6, 3–6
Win	7.	6 October 2003	ITF Juárez, Mexico	Clay	(Argentina) Erica Krauth	6–4, 6–3
Loss	6.	26 April 2005	ITF Torrent, Spain	Clay	(Spain) Paula García	3–6, 7–5, 0–6
Loss	7.	3 July 2005	ITF Mont-de-Marsan, France	Clay	(France) Mathilde Johansson	6–3, 4–6, 4–6
Loss	8.	16 August 2005	ITF Kędzierzyn-Koźle, Poland	Clay	(Czech Republic) Petra Cetkovská	6–3, 4–6, 3–6

=== Doubles (3 titles, 13 runner-ups) ===
Result	No.	Date	Tournament	Surface	Partner	Opponents	Score
Loss	1.	7 September 1998	ITF Lima, Peru	Clay	(Argentina) Sabrina Valenti	(Colombia) Mariana Mesa (Germany) Nina Nittinger	3–6, 5–7
Loss	2.	10 May 1999	ITF Tortosa, Spain	Clay	(Argentina) Sabrina Valenti	(Switzerland) Marylene Losey (Netherlands) Susanne Trik	1–6, 2–6
Win	1.	4 October 1999	ITF Santiago, Chile	Clay	(Switzerland) Aliénor Tricerri	(Argentina) Jorgelina Cravero (Argentina) María Emilia Salerni	7–5, 6–4
Loss	3.	1 May 2000	ITF Bari, Italy	Clay	(Argentina) Sabrina Valenti	(Argentina) Vanesa Krauth (Switzerland) Aliénor Tricerri	5–7, 4–6
Loss	4.	8 May 2000	ITF Caserta, Italy	Clay	(Argentina) Sabrina Valenti	(Slovakia) Silvia Uríčková (Russia) Elena Voropaeva	6–7^{(6–8)}, 6–2, 5–7
Loss	5.	4 September 2000	ITF Buenos Aires, Argentina	Clay	(Argentina) Sabrina Valenti	(Colombia) Mariana Mesa (Argentina) Romina Ottoboni	6–1, 4–6, 3–6
Loss	6.	11 September 2000	ITF Buenos Aires, Argentina	Clay	(Argentina) Sabrina Valenti	(Argentina) Geraldine Aizenberg (Argentina) Paula Racedo	2–6, 2–6
Loss	7.	7 May 2001	ITF Maglie, Italy	Clay	(Argentina) Luciana Masante	(Spain) Rosa María Andrés Rodríguez (Argentina) Eugenia Chialvo	4–6, 4–6
Loss	8.	25 June 2001	ITF Fontanafredda, Italy	Clay	(Argentina) Melisa Arévalo	(Brazil) Joana Cortez (Brazil) Vanessa Menga	3–6, 3–6
Loss	9.	19 August 2001	ITF Paraná, Argentina	Clay	(Argentina) Melisa Arévalo	(Argentina) Jorgelina Cravero (Argentina) Erica Krauth	2–6, 3–6
Loss	10.	27 August 2001	ITF Asunción, Paraguay	Clay	(Uruguay) Claudia Salgues	(Brazil) Maria Fernanda Alves (Brazil) Carla Tiene	6–2, 3–6, 3–6
Loss	11.	24 March 2002	ITF Amiens, France	Clay (i)	(Netherlands) Tessy van de Ven	(Ukraine) Yuliya Beygelzimer (Russia) Marianna Yuferova	2–6, 7–5, 2–6
Loss	12.	27 May 2002	ITF Campobasso, Italy	Clay	(Argentina) Melisa Arévalo	(Germany) Caroline-Ann Basu (Uruguay) Daniela Olivera	4–6, 5–7
Loss	13.	16 May 2004	Open Saint Gaudens, France	Clay	(Poland) Marta Domachowska	(Romania) Ruxandra Dragomir (Romania) Andreea Vanc	3–6, 1–6
Win	2.	21 June 2004	ITF Périgueux, France	Clay	(Brazil) Maria Fernanda Alves	(Canada) Erica Biro (United States) Sarah Riske	6–1, 6–2
Win	3.	3 July 2005	ITF Mont-de-Marsan, France	Hard	(Portugal) Frederica Piedade	(France) Émilie Bacquet (France) Violette Huck	6–1, 7–6^{(7–5)}
