= Florencia Cianfagna =

Argentine tennis player

- Full name: María Florencia Cianfagna
- Country (sports): Argentina
- Born: 30 January 1974 (age 51)
- Prize money: $27,890

Singles
- Career record: 78–85
- Career titles: 0
- Highest ranking: No. 365 (12 August 1996)

Doubles
- Career record: 95–82
- Career titles: 6 ITF
- Highest ranking: No. 162 (7 July 1997)

María Florencia Cianfagna (born 30 January 1974), known as Florencia Cianfagna, is an Argentine former professional tennis player.

Cianfagna played on the professional tour in the 1990s, reaching best rankings of 365 in singles and 162 in doubles. She won six ITF doubles titles, which included a $25k tournament in Florianópolis in 1996. Her only WTA Tour main-draw appearance came at the 1997 Madrid Open, where she featured in the women's doubles.

== ITF Circuit finals ==
$25,000 tournaments
$10,000 tournaments

=== Singles: 1 (runner-up) ===
Result	No.	Date	Tournament	Surface	Opponent	Score
Loss	1.	20 May 1996	ITF Buenos Aires, Argentina	Clay	(Argentina) Mariana Lopez Palacios	1–6, 6–1, 6–7^{(6)}

=== Doubles: 10 (6 titles, 4 runner-ups) ===
Result	No.	Date	Tournament	Surface	Partner	Opponents	Score
Loss	1.	21 September 1992	ITF Guayaquil, Ecuador	Clay	(Argentina) María Fernanda Landa	(Venezuela) Ninfa Marra (Brazil) Sumara Passos	1–6, 6–7
Loss	2.	19 October 1992	ITF Buenos Aires, Argentina	Clay	(Argentina) María Fernanda Landa	(Argentina) Laura Montalvo (Argentina) Mariana Randrup	3–6, 6–3, 3–6
Win	1.	16 May 1994	ITF Tortosa, Spain	Clay	(Belgium) Caroline Bodart	(Argentina) Mariana Randrup (Colombia) Ximena Rodríguez	6–4, 6–2
Loss	3.	22 May 1995	ITF Barcelona, Spain	Clay	(Argentina) Veronica Stele	(Spain) Estefania Bottini (Spain) Gala Leon Garcia	5–7, 5–7
Win	2.	6 June 1994	ITF Murska, Slovenia	Clay	(Hungary) Ágnes Gee	(Slovakia) Simona Galiková (Slovakia) Magdaléna Garguláková	6–3, 5–7, 6–1
Win	3.	20 February 1995	ITF Cali, Colombia	Clay	(Argentina) Pamela Zingman	(Czech Republic) Dominika Górecka (Czech Republic) Kateřina Vlčková	6–4, 6–7^{(5)}, 6–4
Loss	4.	13 November 1995	ITF Buenos Aires, Argentina	Clay	(Argentina) Paola Suárez	(Hungary) Katalin Marosi (Brazil) Miriam D'Agostini	7–6^{(4)}, 0–6, 3–6
Win	4.	5 May 1996	ITF Florianópolis, Brazil	Clay	(Monaco) Emmanuelle Gagliardi	(Brazil) Miriam D'Agostini (Brazil) Andrea Vieira	4–6, 6–4, 6–4
Win	5.	21 July 1996	ITF São Paulo, Brazil	Clay	(Germany) Nina Nittinger	(Argentina) Geraldine Aizenberg (Brazil) Renata Diez	6–4, 4–6, 6–2
Win	6.	9 December 1996	ITF São Paulo, Brazil	Clay	(Hungary) Katalin Marosi	(United States) Keirsten Alley (United States) Paige Yaroshuk	6–4, 6–7^{(4)}, 6–3
