= Jorgelina Cravero =

Argentine tennis player

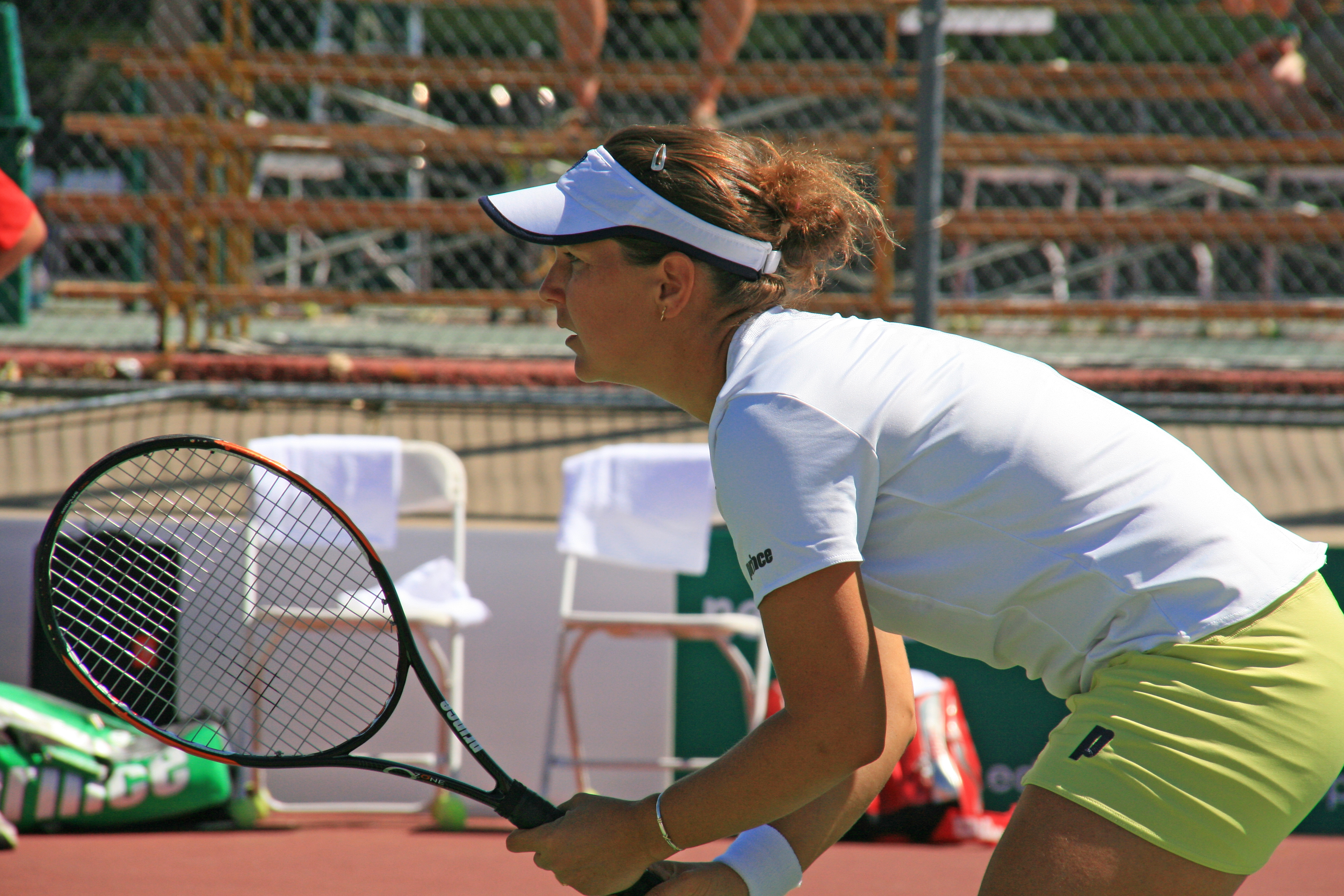
- Country (sports): Argentina
- Residence: Buenos Aires, Argentina
- Born: 27 January 1982 (age 44) San Francisco, Argentina
- Height: 1.63 m (5 ft 4 in)
- Turned pro: 2000
- Retired: 2011
- Plays: Right (two-handed backhand)
- Prize money: $287,311

Singles
- Career record: 332–215
- Career titles: 15 ITF
- Highest ranking: No. 106 (10 September 2007)

Grand Slam singles results
- Australian Open: 1R (2007)
- French Open: Q3 (2007)
- Wimbledon: 1R (2007)
- US Open: 1R (2007)

Doubles
- Career record: 288–166
- Career titles: 34 ITF
- Highest ranking: No. 114 (17 November 2008)

Grand Slam doubles results
- Wimbledon: 1R (2008)

Team competitions
- Fed Cup: 6–7
Medal record
Representing ARG
Women's tennis
Pan American Games
Gold medal – first place	2007 Rio de Janeiro	Doubles

Jorgelina Cravero (born 27 January 1982) is a former professional tennis player from Argentina.

She has career-high WTA rankings of 106 in singles (achieved September 2007) and 114 in doubles (set on 17 November 2008). Cravero has not won any titles on the WTA Tour in singles or doubles. However, she won 15 singles titles and 34 doubles titles on the ITF Circuit.

In 2007, Cravero qualified for three of the four Grand Slam tournaments, losing in the opening round every time: to Justine Henin at Wimbledon, to Martina Müller at the Australian Open and to Aravane Rezaï at the US Open.

Playing for Argentina Fed Cup team, Cravero has a win–loss record of 6–7.

The most memorable experiences were qualifying for the Australian Open and Wimbledon in 2007. Cravero enjoys the clay surface best of all and started playing tennis at the age of five. She turned professional in 2000.

In 2011, she announced her retirement from tennis.

== Personal ==
Cravero was born in San Francisco, Córdoba. The right-hander lives in Buenos Aires. Her father, Carlos, is an accountant; her mother, Rita, is a math teacher. She has one brother, Eugenio, and three sisters, Monica, Daniela and Maria Alejandra.

== ITF Circuit finals ==
=== Singles: 23 (15 titles, 8 runner-ups) ===
Legend $75,000 tournaments $50,000 tournaments $40,000 tournaments $25,000 tournaments $10,000 tournaments	Finals by surface Hard (7–1) Clay (8–7)

Result	No.	Date	Tournament	Surface	Opponent	Score
Win	1.	1 May 2000	ITF Itajaí, Brazil	Hard	(Argentina) Natalia Garbellotto	6–3, 6–3
Loss	1.	18 September 2000	ITF Santiago, Chile	Clay	(Paraguay) Larissa Schaerer	4–6, 3–6
Win	2.	23 July 2001	ITF Puerto Ordaz, Venezuela	Hard	(Venezuela) Stephanie Schaer	6–2, 2–6, 6–1
Win	3.	13 August 2001	ITF La Paz, Bolivia	Clay	(Brazil) Carla Tiene	6–3, 6–3
Loss	2.	23 August 2003	ITF Santiago, Chile	Clay	(Argentina) Vanina García Sokol	6–4, 3–6, 3–6
Win	4.	31 August 2003	ITF Asunción, Paraguay	Clay	(Brazil) Carla Tiene	6–1, 6–3
Loss	3.	18 October 2004	ITF Aguascalientes, Mexico	Clay	(France) Kildine Chevalier	3–6, 4–6
Win	5.	25 October 2004	ITF Los Mochis, Mexico	Clay	(Argentina) Micaela Moran	6–2, 6–1
Loss	4.	10 May 2005	ITF Los Mochis, Mexico	Clay	(Argentina) Flavia Mignola	1–6, 7–6^{(5)}, 4–6
Loss	5.	3 October 2005	ITF Córdoba, Argentina	Clay	(Uruguay) Estefanía Craciún	4–6, 3–6
Win	6.	10 October 2005	ITF San Miguel de Tucumán, Argentina	Clay	(Uruguay) Estefanía Craciún	6–1, 4–6, 6–4
Win	7.	17 October 2005	ITF Asunción, Paraguay	Clay	(Uruguay) Estefanía Craciún	6–4, 7–6^{(7)}
Loss	6.	28 November 2005	ITF San Luis Potosí, Mexico	Hard	(Portugal) Frederica Piedade	3–6, 1–6
Win	8.	3 April 2006	ITF Coatzacoalcos, Mexico	Hard	(Uruguay) Estefanía Craciún	7–5, 6–1
Win	9.	16 May 2006	ITF Palm Beach, United States	Clay	(Paraguay) Rossana de los Ríos	6–2, 6–4
Win	10.	15 October 2006	ITF Saltillo, Mexico	Hard	(Portugal) Frederica Piedade	6–2, 6–2
Win	11.	22 October 2006	ITF Victoria, Mexico	Hard	(Italy) Stella Menna	6–2, 6–1
Win	12.	30 October 2006	ITF Santa Cru, Bolivia	Clay	(Czech Republic) Hana Šromová	6–1, 6–7^{(5)}, 7–6^{(5)}
Win	13.	10 June 2007	Open de Marseille, France	Clay	(France) Stéphanie Cohen-Aloro	6–2, 6–4
Win	14.	3 August 2008	ITF Campos do Jordão, Brazil	Hard	(Argentina) Florencia Molinero	6–3, 6–2
Loss	7.	5 October 2008	ITF Juárez, Mexico	Clay	(Argentina) Betina Jozami	2–2 ret.
Loss	8.	30 March 2009	ITF Pelham, United States	Clay	(Paraguay) Rossana de los Ríos	4–6, 1–6
Win	15.	11 June 2011	ITF Rosario, Argentina	Hard	(Argentina) Vanesa Furlanetto	4–6, 6–3, 6–4

=== Doubles: 54 (34 titles, 20 runner-ups) ===
Result	No.	Date	Tournament	Surface	Partner	Opponents	Score
Win	1.	28 September 1998	ITF Córdoba, Argentina	Clay	(Argentina) Eugenia Chialvo	(Germany) Camilla Kremer (Germany) Nina Nittinger	6–4, 2–6, 6–3
Loss	2.	30 August 1999	ITF Buenos Aires, Argentina	Clay	(Argentina) Eugenia Chialvo	(Argentina) Geraldine Aizenberg (Paraguay) Rossana de los Ríos	5–7, 1–6
Loss	3.	27 September 1999	ITF Montevideo, Uruguay	Clay	(Argentina) María Emilia Salerni	(Mexico) Melody Falcó (Dominican Republic) Joelle Schad	3–6, 4–6
Loss	4.	4 October 1999	ITF Santiago, Chile	Clay	(Argentina) María Emilia Salerni	(Argentina) Natalia Gussoni (Switzerland) Aliénor Tricerri	5–7, 4–6
Win	5.	1 May 2000	ITF Itajaí, Brazil	Hard	(Uruguay) Claudia Salgues	(Brazil) Nathalia Bellizia (Brazil) Letícia Sobral	6–3, 6–2
Loss	6.	3 July 2000	ITF Mont-de-Marsan, France	Clay	(Argentina) Eugenia Chialvo	(Spain) Eva Bes (Spain) Alicia Ortuño	2–6, 2–6
Win	7.	24 July 2000	ITF Camaiore, Italy	Clay	(Argentina) Eugenia Chialvo	(Italy) Alberta Brianti (Italy) Giulia Meruzzi	6–2, 6–1
Win	8.	18 September 2000	ITF Asunción, Paraguay	Clay	(Argentina) Gisela Dulko	(Paraguay) Larissa Schaerer (Paraguay) Sarah Tami Masi	4–6, 6–3, 6–3
Win	9.	25 September 2000	ITF Montevideo, Uruguay	Clay	(Argentina) Gisela Dulko	(Argentina) Geraldine Aizenberg (Argentina) Paula Racedo	6–1, 6–4
Loss	10.	23 July 2001	ITF Puerto Ordaz, Venezuela	Hard	(Argentina) Virginia Tomatis	(Venezuela) Stephanie Schaer (Venezuela) Fabiana Taverna	6–3, 3–6, 4–6
Win	11.	19 August 2001	ITF Paraná, Argentina	Clay	(Argentina) Erica Krauth	(Argentina) Melisa Arévalo (Argentina) Natalia Gussoni	6–2, 6–3
Loss	12.	23 September 2001	ITF São Paulo, Brazil	Hard	(Argentina) Melisa Arévalo	(Brazil) Vanessa Menga (Brazil) Carla Tiene	3–6, 1–6
Win	13.	1 October 2001	ITF Mexico City	Clay	(Argentina) Salome Llaguno	(Bolivia) Monica Poveda (Mexico) Alejandra Rivero	6–3, 6–4
Win	14.	4 November 2001	ITF San Salvador, El Salvador	Clay (i)	(Brazil) Carla Tiene	(Mexico) Maria Eugenia Brito (Mexico) Erika Clarke	6–1, 6–3
Win	15.	11 February 2002	ITF Matamoros, Mexico	Hard	(Brazil) Carla Tiene	(Argentina) Melisa Arévalo (Brazil) Vanessa Menga	6–2, 2–6, 7–5
Win	16.	18 February 2002	ITF Victoria, Mexico	Hard	(Brazil) Carla Tiene	(Argentina) Melisa Arévalo (Brazil) Vanessa Menga	6–2, 7–5
Win	17.	2 April 2002	ITF Coatzacoalcos, Mexico	Hard	(Mexico) Melissa Torres Sandoval	(Russia) Ekaterina Kozhokina (Australia) Anastasia Rodionova	6–4, 6–3
Loss	18.	11 November 2002	ITF Puebla, Mexico	Hard	(Mexico) Melissa Torres Sandoval	(Czech Republic) Olga Vymetálková (Czech Republic) Gabriela Chmelinová	1–6, 6–4, 6–7^{(4)}
Win	19.	14 April 2003	ITF San Luis Potosí, Mexico	Clay	(Argentina) Vanina García Sokol	(France) Kildine Chevalier (Croatia) Lana Popadić	6–1, 6–3
Win	20.	23 August 2003	ITF Paraná, Argentina	Clay	(Argentina) Vanina García Sokol	(Argentina) Erica Krauth (Brazil) Carla Tiene	6–1, 6–3
Win	21.	31 August 2003	ITF Asunción, Paraguay	Clay	(Brazil) Carla Tiene	(Brazil) Joana Cortez (Brazil) Marina Tavares	6–3, 6–4
Loss	22.	25 April 2004	ITF Poza Rica, Mexico	Hard	(Turkey) İpek Şenoğlu	(Spain) Lourdes Domínguez Lino (Portugal) Frederica Piedade	5–7, 0–6
Loss	23.	18 October 2004	ITF Aguascalientes, Mexico	Clay	(Argentina) Flavia Mignola	(Mexico) Marcela Arroyo (Mexico) Melissa Torres Sandoval	3–6, 2–6
Win	24.	25 October 2004	ITF Los Mochis, Mexico	Clay	(Argentina) Flavia Mignola	(Chile) Valentina Castro (Uruguay) Ana Lucía Migliarini de León	6–2, 3–6, 7–5
Win	25.	1 November 2004	ITF Salta, Argentina	Clay	(Argentina) Soledad Esperón	(Argentina) Belen Corbalan (Argentina) Luciana Sarmenti	6–2, 6–1
Win	26.	15 March 2005	ITF Morelia, Mexico	Hard	(Argentina) Veronica Spiegel	(Austria) Daniela Klemenschits (Austria) Sandra Klemenschits	6–4, 6–2
Loss	27.	5 April 2005	ITF Coatzacoalcos, Mexico	Hard	(France) Kildine Chevalier	(Ukraine) Mariya Koryttseva (Hungary) Rita Kuti-Kis	2–6, 3–6
Win	28.	11 April 2005	ITF Tampico, Mexico	Hard	(France) Kildine Chevalier	(Argentina) Andrea Benítez (Argentina) Flavia Mignola	7–6^{(6)}, 2–6, 7–5
Win	29.	10 May 2005	ITF Los Mochis, Mexico	Clay	(Argentina) Flavia Mignola	(Mexico) Lorena Arias (Mexico) Erika Clarke	6–3, 6–0
Win	30.	17 May 2005	ITF Mazatlán, Mexico	Hard	(Argentina) Flavia Mignola	(United States) Lauren Barnikow (United States) Kelly Schmandt	6–4, 6–3
Loss	31.	21 October 2006	ITF Victoria, Mexico	Hard	(Portugal) Frederica Piedade	(Brazil) Carla Tiene (Brazil) Jenifer Widjaja	7–5, 4–6, 4–6
Win	32.	30 October 2006	ITF Santa Cruz, Bolivia	Clay	(Brazil) Joana Cortez	(Argentina) Soledad Esperón (Brazil) Carla Tiene	6–2, 4–6, 6–4
Win	33.	13 March 2007	ITF Orange County, United States	Clay	(Chinese Taipei) Hsieh Su-wei	(Chinese Taipei) Chan Chin-wei (Ukraine) Tetiana Luzhanska	6–3, 6–1
Loss	34.	20 March 2007	ITF Redding, United States	Hard	(Chinese Taipei) Hsieh Su-wei	(Chinese Taipei) Chan Chin-wei (United States) Julie Ditty	3–6, 2–6
Win	35.	20 May 2007	Open Saint-Gaudens, France	Clay	(Belarus) Darya Kustova	(Uzbekistan) Akgul Amanmuradova (France) Iryna Brémond	6–1, 6–3
Win	36.	10 June 2007	ITF Madrid, Spain	Clay	(Argentina) Betina Jozami	(Russia) Nina Bratchikova (Portugal) Neuza Silva	6–4, 6–4
Win	37.	5 August 2007	ITF Washington, United States	Hard	(Argentina) Betina Jozami	(United States) Julie Ditty (South Africa) Natalie Grandin	1–6, 6–1, 6–2
Loss	38.	8 October 2007	ITF San Francisco, United States	Hard	(Argentina) Betina Jozami	(United States) Angela Haynes (United States) Raquel Kops-Jones	6–3, 4–6, [7–10]
Win	39.	5 April 2008	ITF Civitavecchia, Italy	Clay	(Argentina) Betina Jozami	(Italy) Stefania Chieppa (Belarus) Darya Kustova	4–6, 6–3, [10–6]
Loss	40.	7 April 2008	Open de Biarritz, France	Clay	(Argentina) Betina Jozami	(Germany) Martina Müller (Australia) Christina Wheeler	6–7, 6–3, [8–10]
Loss	41.	28 July 2008	ITF Campos do Jordão, Brazil	Clay	(Argentina) María Irigoyen	(Argentina) Mailen Auroux (Brazil) Roxane Vaisemberg	3–6, 4–6
Loss	42.	15 September 2008	ITF Albuquerque, United States	Clay	(Argentina) Betina Jozami	(United States) Julie Ditty (United States) Carly Gullickson	3–6, 4–6
Win	43.	29 September 2008	ITF Juárez, Mexico	Clay	(Argentina) Betina Jozami	(Argentina) Soledad Esperón (Argentina) Florencia Molinero	6–0, 7–6^{(8)}
Win	44.	13 October 2008	ITF Mexico City	Hard	(Argentina) Veronica Spiegel	(Spain) Sara del Barrio Aragón (Portugal) Frederica Piedade	6–4, 7–5
Win	45.	16 February 2009	ITF Surprise, United States	Hard	(Russia) Ekaterina Lopes	(United States) Ahsha Rolle (Belgium) Yanina Wickmayer	6–1, 6–1
Win	46.	16 March 2009	ITF Irapuato, Mexico	Hard	(Argentina) Veronica Spiegel	(Argentina) Soledad Esperón (South Africa) Chanelle Scheepers	6–1, 6–0
Loss	47.	25 May 2009	Grado Tennis Cup, Italy	Clay	(Georgia (country)) Anna Tatishvili	(Hungary) Anikó Kapros (Austria) Sandra Klemenschits	3–6, 0–6
Win	48.	13 June 2009	ITF Campobasso, Italy	Clay	(Portugal) Frederica Piedade	(Italy) Anna Floris (Italy) Valentina Sulpizio	6–3, 6–4
Loss	49.	22 June 2009	ITF Périgueux, France	Clay	(Argentina) María Irigoyen	(Ukraine) Yuliya Beygelzimer (Russia) Ksenia Lykina	6–2, 2–6, [5–10]
Win	50.	5 July 2009	ITF Mont-de-Marsan, France	Clay	(Argentina) María Irigoyen	(Russia) Maria Kondratieva (France) Sophie Lefèvre	2–6, 6–4, [10–7]
Loss	51.	5 October 2009	ITF Troy, United States	Hard	(Romania) Edina Gallovits-Hall	(Slovenia) Petra Rampre (Austria) Nicole Rottmann	3–6, 6–3, [8–10]
Loss	52.	16 January 2010	ITF Plantation, United States	Clay	(Argentina) María Irigoyen	(France) Aurélie Védy (United States) Mashona Washington	0–6, 2–6
Win	53.	25 September 2010	Challenger de Saguenay, Canada	Hard (i)	(France) Stéphanie Foretz	(Canada) Heidi El Tabakh (Canada) Rebecca Marino	6–3, 6–4
Win	54.	10 June 2011	ITF Rosario, Argentina	Clay	(Argentina) Betina Jozami	(Argentina) Florencia di Biasi (Argentina) Vanesa Furlanetto	6–2, 7–6^{(7)}
