= Nina Nittinger =

German tennis player

- Country (sports): Germany
- Born: 16 June 1976 (age 48)
- Prize money: $52,254

Singles
- Career record: 99–197
- Career titles: 2 ITF
- Highest ranking: No. 286 (23 June 1997)

Doubles
- Career record: 77–133
- Career titles: 5 ITF
- Highest ranking: No. 271 (21 June 1999)

Nina Nittinger (born 16 June 1976) is a German former professional tennis player.

Nittinger reached a best singles ranking of 286 in the world and won two ITF titles. She won a further five ITF titles in doubles.

All of her WTA Tour main-draw appearances were in doubles, with her best performance coming at the 1999 Croatian Bol Ladies Open, where she and partner Amanda Grahame were quarterfinalists.

== ITF Circuit finals ==
=== Singles: 4 (2–2) ===
Result	Date	Tournament	Surface	Opponent	Score
Loss	22 August 1994	ITF Haifa, Israel	Hard	(Israel) Shiri Burstein	6–7^{(0)}, 0–6
Loss	11 September 1995	ITF Bucaramanga, Colombia	Clay	(Argentina) Mariana Díaz Oliva	5–7, 2–6
Win	21 July 1996	ITF São Paulo, Brazil	Clay	(Canada) Martina Nejedly	6–4, 6–4
Win	1 September 1996	ITF La Paz, Bolivia	Clay	(Colombia) Giana Gutiérrez	7–6, 6–3

=== Doubles: 9 (5–4) ===
Result	Date	Tournament	Surface	Partner	Opponents	Score
Win	31 January 1994	ITF Istanbul, Turkey	Hard	(Czech Republic) Radka Surová	(Romania) Daniela Ivana (Romania) Madalina Niculaita	6–1, 6–3, 6–4
Win	13 November 1995	ITF San Salvador, El Salvador	Clay	(United Kingdom) Joanne Moore	(United States) Keirsten Alley (United States) Angela Bernal	6–3, 3–6, 6–3
Loss	20 November 1995	ITF Curaçao, Netherlands	Hard	(Colombia) Giana Gutiérrez	(Mexico) Jessica Fernández (Germany) Cornelia Grünes	2–6, 1–6
Loss	18 March 1996	ITF Nairobi, Kenya	Hard	(Netherlands) Martine Vosseberg	(United States) Audra Brannon (United States) Dana Evans	4–6, 1–6
Win	21 July 1996	ITF São Paulo, Brazil	Clay	(Argentina) Florencia Cianfagna	(Argentina) Geraldine Aizenberg (Brazil) Renata Diez	6–4, 4–6, 6–2
Win	7 September 1998	ITF Lima, Peru	Clay	(Colombia) Mariana Mesa	(Argentina) Natalia Gussoni (Argentina) Sabrina Valenti	6–3, 7–5
Loss	28 September 1998	ITF Córdoba, Argentina	Clay	(Germany) Camilla Kremer	(Argentina) Eugenia Chialvo (Argentina) Jorgelina Cravero	4–6, 6–2, 3–6
Win	7 October 2001	ITF Santo Domingo, Dominican Republic	Clay	(Austria) Jennifer Schmidt	(Germany) Jacqueline Fröhlich (United States) Jacquelyn Rosen	7–5, 6–3
Loss	26 August 2002	ITF Bucharest, Romania	Clay	(Czech Republic) Iveta Gerlová	(Romania) Gabriela Niculescu (Romania) Monica Niculescu	2–6, 2–6
