= Eugenia Chialvo =

Argentine tennis player

- Country (sports): Argentina
- Born: 21 February 1983 (age 42); San Francisco, Argentina
- Plays: Left-handed
- Prize money: $22,896

Singles
- Career record: 65–38
- Career titles: 2 ITF
- Highest ranking: No. 279 (11 June 2001)

Doubles
- Career record: 51–27
- Career titles: 6 ITF
- Highest ranking: No. 162 (23 July 2001)

Eugenia Chialvo (born 21 February 1983) is an Argentine former professional tennis player.

== Biography ==
Chialvo grew up in the city of San Francisco in Córdoba. She was a member of the Argentine side which won the 1999 Junior Fed Cup in Perth, along with Gisela Dulko and María Emilia Salerni.

As a left-handed player, Chialvo reached the best singles ranking of No. 279 in the world and won two ITF titles. As a doubles player she won a further six titles, with a top ranking of 162. She featured in the doubles main draw of WTA Tour tournaments in Madrid and Palermo in 2001, both partnering Conchita Martinez Granados.

== ITF Circuit finals ==
Legend
$50,000 tournaments
$25,000 tournaments
$10,000 tournaments

=== Singles (2–2) ===
Result	No.	Date	Tournament	Surface	Opponent	Score
Loss	1.	3 October 1999	ITF Montevideo, Uruguay	Clay	(Argentina) María Emilia Salerni	3–6, 0–6
Loss	2.	10 October 1999	ITF Santiago, Chile	Clay	(Argentina) María Emilia Salerni	1–6, 3–6
Win	1.	19 June 2000	ITF Alkmaar, Netherlands	Clay	(Argentina) Erica Krauth	5–5 ret.
Win	2.	30 July 2000	ITF Camaiore, Italy	Clay	(Estonia) Maret Ani	6–1, 2–6, 7–5

=== Doubles (6–7) ===
Result	No.	Date	Tournament	Surface	Partner	Opponents	Score
Win	1.	28 September 1998	ITF Córdoba, Argentina	Clay	(Argentina) Jorgelina Cravero	(Germany) Camilla Kremer (Germany) Nina Nittinger	6–4, 2–6, 6–3
Loss	1.	30 August 1999	ITF Buenos Aires, Argentina	Clay	(Argentina) Jorgelina Cravero	(Argentina) Geraldine Aizenberg (Paraguay) Rossana de los Ríos	5–7, 1–6
Win	2.	12 June 2000	ITF Hoorn, Netherlands	Clay	(Argentina) Paula Racedo	(Romania) Diana Gherghi (Australia) Kristen van Elden	4–6, 6–2, 6–0
Loss	2.	3 July 2000	ITF Mont-de-Marsan, France	Clay	(Argentina) Jorgelina Cravero	(Spain) Eva Bes (Spain) Alicia Ortuño	2–6, 2–6
Loss	3.	17 July 2000	ITF Le Touquet, France	Clay	(Spain) Lourdes Domínguez Lino	(Germany) Bianka Lamade (Germany) Jasmin Wöhr	3–6, 5–7
Win	3.	24 July 2000	ITF Camaiore, Italy	Clay	(Argentina) Jorgelina Cravero	(Italy) Alberta Brianti (Italy) Giulia Meruzzi	6–2, 6–1
Loss	4.	1 October 2000	ITF Verona, Italy	Clay	(Spain) Lourdes Dominguez Lino	(Italy) Maria Elena Camerin (Romania) Andreea Ehritt-Vanc	6–7, 2–6
Win	4.	15 April 2001	ITF San Luis Potosí, Mexico	Clay	(Spain) Conchita Martínez Granados	(Brazil) Joana Cortez (Argentina) Clarisa Fernández	6–7^{(3)}, 6–1, 6–1
Loss	5.	22 April 2001	ITF Coatzacoalcos, Mexico	Hard	(Spain) Conchita Martínez Granados	(Argentina) Erica Krauth (Argentina) Vanesa Krauth	1–6, 4–6
Win	5.	30 April 2001	ITF Taranto, Italy	Clay	(Spain) Eva Bes	(Italy) Antonella Serra Zanetti (Italy) Roberta Vinci	6–2, 1–6, 6–3
Win	6.	7 May 2001	ITF Maglie, Italy	Clay	(Spain) Rosa María Andrés Rodríguez	(Argentina) Natalia Gussoni (Argentina) Luciana Masante	6–4, 6–4
Loss	6.	21 July 2001	ITF Modena, Italy	Clay	(Spain) Conchita Martínez Granados	(Russia) Galina Fokina (Belarus) Nadejda Ostrovskaya	3–6, 2–6
Loss	7.	10 September 2001	ITF Fano, Italy	Clay	(Spain) Gisela Riera	(Estonia) Maret Ani (Italy) Gloria Pizzichini	w/o
