= Geraldine Aizenberg =

Argentine tennis player

- Country (sports): Argentina
- Born: 31 January 1978 (age 47)
- Prize money: $54,460

Singles
- Career record: 140–131
- Career titles: 0
- Highest ranking: No. 180 (10 November 1997)

Grand Slam singles results
- US Open: Q1 (1998)

Doubles
- Career record: 97–97
- Career titles: 5 ITF
- Highest ranking: No. 172 (8 July 1996)

Geraldine Aizenberg (born 31 January 1978) is an Argentine former professional tennis player.

Aizenberg reached a best singles ranking of 180 in the world. One of her best performances was a runner-up finish at the $50k Jakarta tournament in 1997. She took part in the qualifying draw for the 1998 US Open.

As a doubles player, Aizenberg won five titles on the ITF Circuit. In 1998, she appeared in the main draw of WTA Tour tournaments in Maria Lankowitz, Palermo, and Sopot.

== ITF Circuit finals ==
$75,000 tournaments
$50,000 tournaments
$25,000 tournaments
$10,000 tournaments

=== Singles: 2 (0–2) ===
Result	Date	Tournament	Surface	Opponent	Score
Loss	10 August 1997	ITF Jakarta, Indonesia	Clay	(Chinese Taipei) Wang Shi-ting	1–6, 4–6
Loss	1 October 2000	ITF Montevideo, Uruguay	Clay	(Argentina) Gisela Dulko	1–6, 2–6

=== Doubles: 10 (5–5) ===
Result	Date	Tournament	Surface	Partner	Opponents	Score
Loss	31 July 1995	ITF Brasília, Brazil	Clay	(Dominican Republic) Joelle Schad	(Brazil) Vanessa Menga (Brazil) Andrea Vieira	4–6, 2–6
Win	23 September 1995	ITF Sofia, Bulgaria	Clay	(Argentina) Laura Montalvo	(Bulgaria) Lubomira Bacheva (Hungary) Réka Vidáts	6–2, 6–2
Win	2 June 1996	ITF Buenos Aires, Argentina	Clay	(Argentina) Mariana Lopez-Palacios	(Argentina) Sandra De Amelio (Argentina) Paula Racedo	4–6, 6–3, 6–2
Loss	21 July 1996	ITF Asuncion, Paraguay	Clay	(Argentina) Mariana Faustinelli	(Argentina) Celeste Contín (Argentina) Romina Ottoboni	2–6, 6–4, 0–6
Loss	22 September 1996	ITF São Paulo, Brazil	Clay	(Brazil) Renata Diez	(Germany) Nina Nittinger (Argentina) Florencia Cianfagna	4–6, 6–4, 2–6
Win	12 September 1999	ITF Buenos Aires, Argentina	Clay	(Paraguay) Rossana de los Ríos	(Argentina) Eugenia Chialvo (Argentina) Jorgelina Cravero	7–5, 6–1
Loss	17 July 2000	ITF Brussels, Belgium	Clay	(New Zealand) Shelley Stephens	(Slovakia) Silvia Uríčková (Czech Republic) Magdalena Zděnovcová	6–7^{(6)}, 6–3, 1–6
Win	27 August 2000	ITF Buenos Aires, Argentina	Clay	(Argentina) Luciana Masante	(Argentina) Melisa Arévalo (Argentina) Paula Racedo	6–2, 6–2
Win	11 September 2000	ITF Buenos Aires, Argentina	Clay	(Argentina) Paula Racedo	(Argentina) Natalia Gussoni (Argentina) Sabrina Valenti	6–2, 6–2
Loss	25 September 2000	ITF Montevideo, Uruguay	Clay	(Argentina) Paula Racedo	(Argentina) Gisela Dulko (Argentina) Jorgelina Cravero	1–6, 4–6
