= Mariana Mesa =

Colombian tennis player (born 1980)

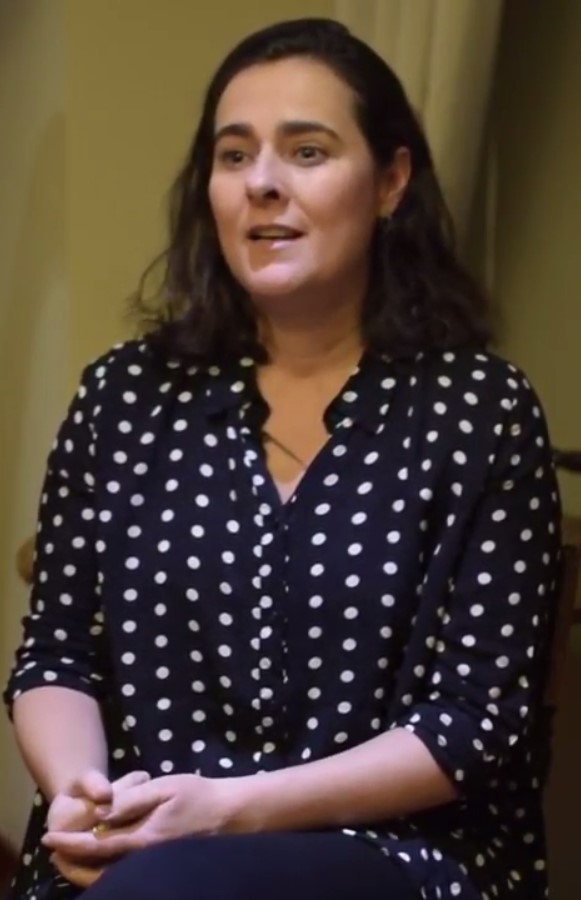
- Full name: Mariana Mesa Pineda
- Country (sports): Colombia
- Born: 1 April 1980 (age 45) Pereira, Colombia
- Height: 1.66 m (5 ft 5 in)
- Plays: Right-handed
- Prize money: $39,467

Singles
- Career record: 90–60
- Career titles: 5 ITF
- Highest ranking: No. 251 (15 May 2000)

Doubles
- Career record: 78–50
- Career titles: 7 ITF
- Highest ranking: No. 161 (7 August 2000)

Team competitions
- Fed Cup: 7–9

Mariana Mesa Pineda (born 1 April 1980) is a Colombian former professional tennis player.

== Biography ==
=== Tennis career ===
Mesa, who grew up in the city of Pereira, made her Fed Cup debut in 1995, having just turned 15. She featured in a total of 12 ties for Colombia during her career, mostly as doubles player, winning seven matches overall.

On the WTA Tour, she made most of her main-draw appearances at her home event, the Copa Colsanitas, playing in every edition of the tournament from 1998 to 2000. She had her best performance in 1998, when she made the round of 16 of the singles and was a doubles semifinalist. Her only other singles main draw came at the 1999 Brasil Open, which she made as a qualifier.

Mesa reached a best singles ranking on tour of 251 in the world and won five ITF Women's Circuit tournaments. As a doubles player she had a top ranking of 161, with seven ITF titles.

At the 2000 Summer Olympics in Sydney, Mesa represented Colombia in the doubles competition, with Fabiola Zuluaga as her partner.

=== Life after tennis ===
Mesa now coaches tennis and also works as broadcaster with Win Sports. She studied political science at Universidad Javeriana.

== ITF Circuit finals ==
=== Singles: 7 (5–2) ===
Outcome	No.	Date	Tournament	Surface	Opponent	Score
Winner	1.	18 September 1994	ITF Manizales, Colombia	Clay	(Germany) Stephania Gehrke	6–3, 6–4
Winner	2.	6 July 1998	ITF Vigo, Spain	Clay	(Argentina) Paula Racedo	6–1, 6–4
Winner	3.	13 September 1998	ITF Lima, Peru	Clay	(Argentina) Sabrina Valenti	6–0, 7–6
Winner	4.	23 May 1999	ITF Zaragoza, Spain	Clay	(Argentina) Luciana Masante	1–6, 6–4, 6–1
Winner	5.	29 August 1999	ITF La Paz, Bolivia	Clay	(Argentina) Melisa Arévalo	6–1, 6–4
Runner-up	1.	26 September 1999	ITF Asunción, Paraguay	Clay	(Argentina) María Emilia Salerni	6–3, 6–7, 5–7
Runner-up	2.	3 September 2000	ITF Buenos Aires, Argentina	Clay	(Argentina) Romina Ottoboni	6–7^{(3)}, 2–6

=== Doubles: 14 (7–7) ===
Outcome	No.	Date	Tournament	Surface	Partner	Opponents	Score
Runner-up	1.	11 September 1995	ITF Bucaramanga, Colombia	Clay	(Colombia) Carmiña Giraldo	(United Kingdom) Joanne Moore (Colombia) Ximena Rodríguez	5–7, 6–4, 4–6
Runner-up	2.	22 June 1998	ITF Santander, Spain	Clay	(Colombia) Juliana Garcia	(Spain) Marina Escobar (Spain) Lourdes Domínguez Lino	1–6, 6–7^{(1)}
Winner	1.	7 September 1998	ITF Lima, Peru	Clay	(Germany) Nina Nittinger	(Argentina) Natalia Gussoni (Argentina) Sabrina Valenti	6–3, 7–5
Runner-up	3.	30 November 1998	ITF Bogotá, Colombia	Clay	(Colombia) Fabiola Zuluaga	(Slovenia) Katarina Srebotnik (Slovakia) Zuzana Váleková	3–6, 4–6
Winner	2.	23 May 1999	ITF Zaragoza, Spain	Clay	(Spain) Lourdes Domínguez Lino	(Argentina) Melisa Arévalo (Argentina) Jorgelina Torti	w/o
Runner-up	4.	31 May 1999	ITF Azeméis, Portugal	Hard	(Argentina) Jorgelina Torti	(Republic of Ireland) Kelly Liggan (Israel) Tzipora Obziler	4–6, 6–4, 6–7^{(6)}
Winner	3.	2 August 1999	ITF Caracas, Venezuela	Hard	(Argentina) Melisa Arévalo	(Slovakia) Gabriela Voleková (Switzerland) Aliénor Tricerri	7–5, 7–6^{(1)}
Winner	4.	23 August 1999	ITF La Paz, Bolivia	Clay	(Argentina) Melisa Arévalo	(Portugal) Helga Vieira (Brazil) Ana Paula Novaes	6–1, 6–4
Runner-up	5.	19 September 1999	ITF Asunción, Paraguay	Hard	(Switzerland) Aliénor Tricerri	(Paraguay) Rossana de los Ríos (Paraguay) Larissa Schaerer	2–6, 3–6
Winner	5.	5 December 1999	ITF Cali, Colombia	Clay	(Colombia) Fabiola Zuluaga	(Brazil) Miriam D'Agostini (Paraguay) Larissa Schaerer	2–6, 7–6, 6–1
Runner-up	6.	24 July 2000	ITF Pamplona, Spain	Hard	(New Zealand) Leanne Baker	(Netherlands) Yvette Basting (Germany) Mia Buric	2–6, 0–6
Runner-up	7.	3 September 2000	ITF Buenos Aires 2	Clay	(Paraguay) Larissa Schaerer	(Argentina) Melisa Arévalo (Argentina) Paula Racedo	3–6, 5–7
Winner	6.	10 September 2000	ITF Buenos Aires 3	Clay	(Argentina) Romina Ottoboni	(Argentina) Sabrina Valenti (Argentina) Natalia Gussoni	1–6, 6–4, 6–3
Winner	7.	8 October 2000	ITF Mexico City	Hard	(Federal Republic of Yugoslavia) Branka Bojović	(Mexico) Alejandra Rivero (Mexico) Zerene Reyes	5–3, 4–0, 3–5
