= Paula Racedo =

Argentine tennis player

- Country (sports): Argentina
- Born: 21 July 1977 (age 48)
- Prize money: $44,117

Singles
- Career titles: 0
- Highest ranking: No. 334 (3 August 1998)

Doubles
- Career titles: 9 ITF
- Highest ranking: No. 204 (17 August 1998)

Paula Racedo (born 21 July 1977) is an Argentine former professional tennis player.

Racedo reached a best singles ranking of 334, playing mostly on the ITF Circuit. She twice featured in the qualifying of the Brasil Open. As a doubles player, she was ranked as high as 204 in the world and won nine ITF titles.

Since retiring, she has worked as a tennis coach, which included a stint in Ecuador where she was the coach of Mell Reasco González.

== ITF finals ==
$25,000 tournaments
$10,000 tournaments

=== Singles: 3 (0–3) ===
Outcome	No.	Date	Tournament	Surface	Opponent	Score
Runner-up	1.	25 September 1995	ITF Guayaquil, Ecuador	Clay	(Argentina) Mariana Diaz-Oliva	0–6, 2–6
Runner-up	2.	6 July 1998	ITF Vigo, Spain	Clay	(Colombia) Mariana Mesa	1–6, 4–6
Runner-up	3.	14 June 1999	ITF Hoorn, Netherlands	Clay	(Italy) Yasmin Angeli	2–6, 3–6

=== Doubles: 23 (9–14) ===
Outcome	No.	Date	Tournament	Surface	Partner	Opponents	Score
Runner-up	1.	9 October 1995	ITF La Paz, Bolivia	Clay	(Paraguay) Laura Bernal	(Sweden) Maria-Farnes Capistrano (Finland) Linda Jansson	5–7, 2–6
Runner-up	2.	6 May 1996	ITF Amazonas, Brazil	Hard	(Argentina) Sandra De Amelio	(Chile) Paula Cabezas (Chile) Barbara Castro	1–6, 3–6
Runner-up	3.	2 June 1996	ITF Buenos Aires, Argentina	Clay	(Argentina) Sandra De Amelio	(Argentina) Mariana Lopez Palacios (Argentina) Geraldine Aizenberg	6–4, 3–6, 2–6
Winner	1.	12 August 1996	ITF Guayaquil, Ecuador	Clay	(Argentina) Mariana Lopez Palacios	(United States) Kristine Kurth (United Kingdom) Joanne Moore	6–2, 5–7, 7–5
Runner-up	4.	19 August 1996	ITF Lima, Peru	Clay	(Argentina) Mariana Lopez Palacios	(United States) Kristine Kurth (United Kingdom) Joanne Moore	2–6, 6–3, 2–6
Runner-up	5.	16 June 1997	ITF Caserta, Italy	Clay	(Colombia) Carmiña Giraldo	(Israel) Limor Gabai (Russia) Lioudmila Skavronskaia	3–6, 3–6
Winner	2.	7 September 1997	ITF Lima, Peru	Clay	(Argentina) Romina Ottoboni	(Peru) María Eugenia Rojas (Israel) Jacquelyn Rosen	6–0, 6–4
Winner	3.	6 October 1997	ITF Montevideo, Uruguay	Clay	(Czech Republic) Monika Maštalířová	(Paraguay) Laura Bernal (Brazil) Vanessa Menga	6–1, 4–6, 6–4
Runner-up	6.	18 October 1997	ITF Asunción, Paraguay	Clay	(Czech Republic) Monika Maštalířová	(Paraguay) Larissa Schaerer (Brazil) Vanessa Menga	w/o
Runner-up	7.	10 November 1997	ITF Rio de Janeiro, Brazil	Clay	(Czech Republic) Monika Maštalířová	(Slovakia) Patrícia Marková (Slovakia) Zuzana Váleková	0–6, 7–6^{(7–4)}, 2–6
Runner-up	8.	14 June 1998	ITF Lenzerheide, Switzerland	Clay	(Switzerland) Emanuela Zardo	(Switzerland) Laura Bao (Switzerland) Caecilia Charbonnier	4–6, 0–6
Runner-up	9.	6 July 1998	ITF Vigo, Spain	Clay	(Brazil) Vanessa Menga	(Spain) Lourdes Domínguez Lino (Spain) Elena Salvador	1–6, 6–4, 2–6
Runner-up	10.	23 November 1998	ITF São Paulo, Brazil	Clay	(Paraguay) Laura Bernal	(Slovakia) Silvia Uríčková (France) Kildine Chevalier	3–6, 6–7^{(7–9)}
Runner-up	11.	4 April 1999	ITF Santiago, Chile	Clay	(Paraguay) Laura Bernal	(Argentina) Jorgelina Torti (Argentina) Melisa Arévalo	4–6, 6–4, 4–6
Winner	4.	3 May 1999	ITF Poza Rica, Mexico	Hard	(Switzerland) Aliénor Tricerri	(Australia) Nadia Johnston (Australia) Nicole Sewell	6–1, 7–6^{(7–5)}
Winner	5.	13 September 1999	ITF Buenos Aires, Argentina	Clay	(Switzerland) Aliénor Tricerri	(Argentina) Laura Montalvo (Argentina) Paola Suárez	w/o
Winner	6.	15 November 1999	ITF Campos, Brazil	Clay	(Italy) Alice Canepa	(Argentina) Jorgelina Torti (Argentina) Melisa Arévalo	5–7, 6–4, 6–1
Runner-up	12.	2 April 2000	ITF Santiago, Chile	Clay	(Argentina) Melisa Arévalo	(Brazil) Miriam D'Agostini (Argentina) Jorgelina Torti	3–6, 6–7^{(3–7)}
Winner	7.	12 June 2000	ITF Hoorn, Netherlands	Clay	(Argentina) Eugenia Chialvo	(Romania) Diana Gherghi (Australia) Kristen Van Elden	4–6, 6–2, 6–0
Runner-up	13.	27 August 2000	ITF Buenos Aires, Argentina	Clay	(Argentina) Melisa Arévalo	(Argentina) Geraldine Aizenberg (Argentina) Luciana Masante	2–6, 2–6
Winner	8.	3 September 2000	ITF Buenos Aires, Argentina	Clay	(Argentina) Melisa Arévalo	(Paraguay) Larissa Schaerer (Colombia) Mariana Mesa	6–3, 7–5
Winner	9.	11 September 2000	ITF Buenos Aires, Argentina	Clay	(Argentina) Geraldine Aizenberg	(Argentina) Natalia Gussoni (Argentina) Sabrina Valenti	6–2, 6–2
Runner-up	14.	25 September 2000	ITF Montevideo, Uruguay	Clay	(Argentina) Geraldine Aizenberg	(Argentina) Gisela Dulko (Argentina) Jorgelina Cravero	1–6, 4–6
