= Pam Nelson (tennis) =

American tennis player

- Country (sports): United States
- Born: July 1, 1975 (age 49)
- Prize money: $50,561

Singles
- Highest ranking: No. 167 (November 3, 1997)

Doubles
- Highest ranking: No. 182 (December 15, 1997)

Pam Nelson (born July 1, 1975) is an American former professional tennis player.

== Biography ==
Nelson, who comes from Ross, California, was a girls' singles semi-finalist at the 1991 Wimbledon Championships and girls' doubles runner-up at the 1992 Wimbledon Championships.

In the early 1990s, Nelson featured in several WTA Tour tournaments, registering main draw wins over Hu Na, Kristin Godridge and Åsa Carlsson.

Nelson left the professional tour to play college tennis for the California Golden Bears of UC Berkeley, winning Pac-10 doubles championships in both 1993 and 1994, with Keirsten Alley. The pair also reached the NCAA doubles semifinals in 1995.

After her college career she returned to the international circuit and won two ITF singles titles in 1996, before reaching her best ranking of 167 in the world in 1997.
