= Paola Suárez =

Argentine tennis player

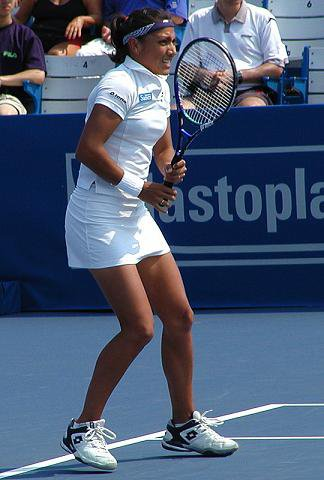
- Country (sports): Argentina
- Residence: Oviedo, Spain
- Born: 23 June 1976 (age 50) Pergamino, Argentina
- Height: 1.70 m (5 ft 7 in)
- Turned pro: 1 March 1991
- Retired: 2007, 2014
- Plays: Right-handed (two-handed backhand)
- Prize money: $5,217,775

Singles
- Career record: 371–239
- Career titles: 4
- Highest ranking: No. 9 (7 June 2004)

Grand Slam singles results
- Australian Open: 4R (2001)
- French Open: SF (2004)
- Wimbledon: QF (2004)
- US Open: QF (2003)

Doubles
- Career record: 513–192
- Career titles: 44
- Highest ranking: No. 1 (9 September 2002)

Grand Slam doubles results
- Australian Open: W (2004)
- French Open: W (2001, 2002, 2004, 2005)
- Wimbledon: F (2002, 2003, 2006)
- US Open: W (2002, 2003, 2004)

Other doubles tournaments
- Tour Finals: W (2003)

Grand Slam mixed doubles results
- Australian Open: F (2002)
- French Open: F (2001)
- Wimbledon: 3R (2000, 2003)
- US Open: 2R (2000, 2003, 2007)
Medal record
Olympic Games
Bronze medal – third place	2004 Athens	Women's doubles

Paola Suárez (Latin American Spanish: [paˈola ˈswaɾes]; born 23 June 1976) is a retired tennis player from Argentina. She was one of the most prominent women's doubles players throughout the early and mid-2000s, winning eight Grand Slam titles, all of them with Virginia Ruano Pascual, and holding the No. 1 doubles ranking for 87 non-consecutive weeks. She was also a singles top ten player and semifinalist at the 2004 French Open.

== Career ==
Suárez began playing professional tennis at the age of 15. In 1994, she joined the professional tour as a singles player.

Suárez won four WTA titles (2004 Canberra, 2003 Vienna, 1998 & 2001 Bogotá) and 12 other minor tournaments. In 2004, she reached her only Grand Slam singles semi-final by defeating the 18th seed and future Wimbledon champion Maria Sharapova, but lost to Elena Dementieva. That year, she reached her highest WTA ranking of No. 9, to become the highest-ranked Argentine women's player since Gabriela Sabatini achieved the No. 3 ranking in 1989. Also in 2004, she won the bronze medal at the Olympic Games in Athens for the women's doubles with Patricia Tarabini. Suárez and Ruano Pascual would end their grand slam season by winning their 3rd consecutive 2004 US Open women's doubles title, becoming the only team in the Open Era (since 1968) to do so. If fact, individually, they are the only two women in the Open Era who have won 3 consecutive women's doubles titles at the US Open.

She had success in singles but her best results came in doubles, winning more than half a dozen titles partnering fellow Argentine Laura Montalvo. However Suárez's more long-standing doubles partnership was with the Spaniard Virginia Ruano Pascual, with whom she won 32 of her 39 titles. Besides numerous WTA Tour titles, they won the French Open on four occasions, the US Open three times, and the Australian Open in 2004. Suárez and Ruano Pascual were the No. 1 female pair for three consecutive years after 9 September 2002 and were the WTA Tour Doubles Team of the Year in 2002, 2003 and 2004. They also reached nine straight Grand Slam finals, two short of Navratilova and Shriver's record of eleven.

In 2005, Suárez announced her forthcoming retirement for personal reasons. In June of that year, she underwent a labrum hip clinical intervention, with a recovery time of three to four months. She restarted playing in Sydney in January 2006 with Ruano Pascual, reaching the final, but suffered a calf injury short after. Later that year, she also reached the final of Wimbledon with Ruano Pascual, marking her third appearance in a final there.

Suárez returned to the circuit with a victory over Dinara Safina, ranked No. 15, in the San Diego Open singles tournament.

On 1 September 2007, Suárez retired after losing in the mixed doubles second round at the US Open. She partnered Kevin Ullyett and lost to Jamie Murray and Liezel Huber, 5–7, 4–6. She briefly returned to the WTA doubles tour in 2012, partnering her fellow Argentinian Gisela Dulko. The pair played at the London Summer Olympics but lost in the first round.

In her career, Suárez earned more than $5.2 million, with four singles titles on the WTA Tour, and eight doubles Grand Slam titles.

== Significant finals ==
=== Grand Slam tournaments ===
==== Doubles: 14 (8 titles, 6 runner-ups) ====
Result	Year	Championship	Surface	Partner	Opponents	Score
Loss	2000	French Open	Clay	(Spain) Virginia Ruano Pascual	(Switzerland) Martina Hingis (France) Mary Pierce	2–6, 4–6
Win	2001	French Open	Clay	(Spain) Virginia Ruano Pascual	(Federal Republic of Yugoslavia) Jelena Dokić (Spain) Conchita Martínez	6–2, 6–1
Win	2002	French Open	Clay	(Spain) Virginia Ruano Pascual	(United States) Lisa Raymond (Australia) Rennae Stubbs	6–4, 6–2
Loss	2002	Wimbledon	Grass	(Spain) Virginia Ruano Pascual	(United States) Serena Williams (United States) Venus Williams	2–6, 5–7
Win	2002	US Open	Hard	(Spain) Virginia Ruano Pascual	(Russia) Elena Dementieva (Slovakia) Janette Husárová	6–2, 6–1
Loss	2003	Australian Open	Hard	(Spain) Virginia Ruano Pascual	(United States) Serena Williams (United States) Venus Williams	6–4, 4–6, 3–6
Loss	2003	French Open	Clay	(Spain) Virginia Ruano Pascual	(Belgium) Kim Clijsters (Japan) Ai Sugiyama	7–6^{(7–5)}, 2–6, 7–9
Loss	2003	Wimbledon	Grass	(Spain) Virginia Ruano Pascual	(Belgium) Kim Clijsters (Japan) Ai Sugiyama	4–6, 4–6
Win	2003	US Open	Hard	(Spain) Virginia Ruano Pascual	(Russia) Svetlana Kuznetsova (United States) Martina Navratilova	6–2, 6–3
Win	2004	Australian Open	Hard	(Spain) Virginia Ruano Pascual	(Russia) Svetlana Kuznetsova (Russia) Elena Likhovtseva	6–4, 6–3
Win	2004	French Open	Clay	(Spain) Virginia Ruano Pascual	(Russia) Svetlana Kuznetsova (Russia) Elena Likhovtseva	6–0, 6–3
Win	2004	US Open	Hard	(Spain) Virginia Ruano Pascual	(Russia) Svetlana Kuznetsova (Russia) Elena Likhovtseva	6–4, 7–5
Win	2005	French Open	Clay	(Spain) Virginia Ruano Pascual	(Zimbabwe) Cara Black (South Africa) Liezel Huber	4–6, 6–3, 6–3
Loss	2006	Wimbledon	Grass	(Spain) Virginia Ruano Pascual	(China) Yan Zi (China) Zheng Jie	3–6, 6–3, 2–6

==== Mixed doubles: 2 (2 runner-ups) ====
Result	Year	Championship	Surface	Partner	Opponents	Score
Loss	2001	French Open	Clay	(Brazil) Jaime Oncins	(Spain) Tomás Carbonell (Spain) Virginia Ruano Pascual	5–7, 3–6
Loss	2002	Australian Open	Hard	(Argentina) Gastón Etlis	(Slovakia) Daniela Hantuchová (Zimbabwe) Kevin Ullyett	3–6, 2–6

=== Olympic Games ===
==== Doubles: 1 (bronze medal) ====
Result	Year	Location	Surface	Partner	Opponents	Score
Bronze	2004	Athens	Hard	(Argentina) Patricia Tarabini	(Japan) Shinobu Asagoe (Japan) Ai Sugiyama	6–3, 6–3

== WTA Tour finals ==
=== Singles: 8 (4 titles, 4 runner-ups) ===
Legend
Tier I
Tier II
Tier III (2/2)
Tier IV & V (2/2)

Result	W–L	Date	Tournament	Surface	Opponent	Score
Win	1–0	Feb 1998	Bogotá, Colombia	Clay	(Canada) Sonya Jeyaseelan	6–3, 6–4
Loss	1–1	May 1999	Madrid, Spain	Clay	(United States) Lindsay Davenport	6–1, 6–3
Loss	1–2	Feb 2000	São Paulo, Brazil	Clay	(Hungary) Rita Kuti-Kis	4–6, 6–4, 7–5
Loss	1–3	Jan 2001	Auckland, New Zealand	Hard	(United States) Meilen Tu	7–6^{(12–10)}, 6–2
Win	2–3	Feb 2001	Bogotá, Colombia	Clay	(Hungary) Rita Kuti-Kis	6–2, 6–4
Loss	2–4	Mar 2002	Acapulco, Mexico	Clay	(Slovenia) Katarina Srebotnik	6–7^{(1–7)}, 6–4, 6–2
Win	3–4	Jun 2003	Vienna, Austria	Clay	(Croatia) Karolina Šprem	7–6^{(7–0)}, 2–6, 6–4
Win	4–4	Jan 2004	Canberra, Australia	Hard	(Italy) Silvia Farina Elia	3–6, 6–4, 7–6^{(7–5)}

=== Doubles: 69 (44 titles, 25 runner-ups) ===
Legend
Grand Slam tournaments (8–6)
WTA Championships (1–0)
Tier I (9–9)
Tier II (5–6)
Tier III (10–2)
Tier IV & V (11–2)

Result	No.	Date	Tournament	Surface	Partner	Opponents	Score
Win	1.	May 1996	Bol	Clay	(Argentina) Laura Montalvo	(France) Alexia Dechaume-Balleret (France) Alexandra Fusai	6–7^{(5–7)}, 6–3, 6–4
Win	2.	Jan 1998	Hobart	Hard	(Spain) Virginia Ruano Pascual	(France) Julie Halard-Decugis (Slovakia) Janette Husárová	7–6^{(8–6)}, 6–3
Win	3.	Feb 1998	Bogotá	Clay	(Slovakia) Janette Husárová	(United States) Melissa Mazzotta (Russia) Ekaterina Sysoeva	3–6, 6–2, 6–3
Win	4.	Apr 1998	Budapest	Clay	(Spain) Virginia Ruano Pascual	(Romania) Cătălina Cristea (Argentina) Laura Montalvo	4–6, 6–1, 6–1
Win	5.	May 1998	Bol	Clay	(Argentina) Laura Montalvo	(South Africa) Joannette Kruger (Croatia) Mirjana Lučić	w/o
Win	6.	May 1998	Rome	Clay	(Spain) Virginia Ruano Pascual	(South Africa) Amanda Coetzer (Spain) Arantxa Sánchez Vicario	7–6^{(7–1)}, 6–4
Win	7.	Jul 1998	Maria Lankowitz	Clay	(Argentina) Laura Montalvo	(Slovenia) Tina Križan (Slovenia) Katarina Srebotnik	6–1, 6–2
Loss	1.	Feb 1999	Bogotá	Clay	(Argentina) Laura Montalvo	(Greece) Christína Papadáki (Netherlands) Seda Noorlander	6–4, 7–6^{(7–5)}
Win	8.	May 1999	Madrid	Clay	(Spain) Virginia Ruano Pascual	(Argentina) María Fernanda Landa (Germany) Marlene Weingärtner	6–2, 0–6, 6–0
Win	9.	Jul 1999	Sopot	Clay	(Argentina) Laura Montalvo	(Spain) Gala León García (Spain) María Sánchez Lorenzo	6–4, 6–3
Win	10.	Oct 1999	São Paulo	Clay	(Argentina) Laura Montalvo	(Slovakia) Janette Husárová (Argentina) Florencia Labat	6–7^{(1–7)}, 7–5, 7–5
Win	11.	Feb 2000	Bogotá	Clay	(Argentina) Laura Montalvo	(Hungary) Rita Kuti-Kis (Hungary) Petra Mandula	6–4, 6–2
Win	12.	Feb 2000	São Paulo	Clay	(Argentina) Laura Montalvo	(Slovakia) Janette Husárová (Argentina) Florencia Labat	5–7, 6–4, 6–3
Win	13.	Apr 2000	Hilton Head	Clay	(Spain) Virginia Ruano Pascual	(Spain) Conchita Martínez (Argentina) Patricia Tarabini	7–5, 6–3
Loss	2.	Jun 2000	French Open	Clay	(Spain) Virginia Ruano Pascual	(Switzerland) Martina Hingis (France) Mary Pierce	6–2, 6–4
Win	14.	Jul 2000	Klagenfurt	Clay	(Argentina) Laura Montalvo	(Austria) Barbara Schett (Switzerland) Patty Schnyder	7–6^{(7–5)}, 6–1
Win	15.	Jul 2000	Sopot	Clay	(Spain) Virginia Ruano Pascual	(Sweden) Åsa Carlsson (Italy) Rita Grande	7–5, 6–1
Loss	3.	Aug 2000	New Haven	Hard	(Spain) Virginia Ruano Pascual	(France) Julie Halard-Decugis (Japan) Ai Sugiyama	6–4, 5–7, 6–2
Loss	4.	Oct 2000	Tokyo	Hard	(Japan) Nana Miyagi	(France) Julie Halard-Decugis (Japan) Ai Sugiyama	6–0, 6–2
Loss	5.	Feb 2001	Bogotá	Clay	(Argentina) Laura Montalvo	(Italy) Tathiana Garbin (Slovakia) Janette Husárová	6–4, 2–6, 6–4
Loss	6.	Mar 2001	Acapulco	Clay	(Spain) Virginia Ruano Pascual	(Spain) Anabel Medina Garrigues (Spain) María José Martínez Sánchez	6–4, 6–7^{(5–7)}, 7–5
Loss	7.	Mar 2001	Indian Wells	Hard	(Spain) Virginia Ruano Pascual	(United States) Nicole Arendt (Japan) Ai Sugiyama	6–4, 6–4
Loss	8.	Apr 2001	Charleston	Clay	(Spain) Virginia Ruano Pascual	(United States) Lisa Raymond (Australia) Rennae Stubbs	5–7, 7–6^{(7–5)}, 6–3
Loss	9.	May 2001	Rome	Clay	(Argentina) Patricia Tarabini	(Zimbabwe) Cara Black (Russia) Elena Likhovtseva	6–1, 6–1
Win	16.	May 2001	Madrid	Clay	(Spain) Virginia Ruano Pascual	(United States) Lisa Raymond (Australia) Rennae Stubbs	7–5, 2–6, 7–6^{(7–4)}
Win	17.	Jun 2001	French Open	Clay	(Spain) Virginia Ruano Pascual	(Federal Republic of Yugoslavia) Jelena Dokic (Spain) Conchita Martínez	6–2, 6–1
Win	18.	Jul 2001	Vienna	Clay	(Argentina) Patricia Tarabini	(Germany) Vanessa Henke (Czech Republic) Lenka Němečková	6–4, 6–2
Win	19.	Feb 2002	Bogotá	Clay	(Spain) Virginia Ruano Pascual	(Slovenia) Tina Križan (Slovenia) Katarina Srebotnik	6–2, 6–1
Win	20.	Mar 2002	Acapulco	Clay	(Spain) Virginia Ruano Pascual	(Slovenia) Tina Križan (Slovenia) Katarina Srebotnik	7–5, 6–1
Loss	10.	Apr 2002	Miami	Hard	(Spain) Virginia Ruano Pascual	(United States) Lisa Raymond (Australia) Rennae Stubbs	7–6^{(7–4)}, 6–7^{(4–7)}, 6–3
Win	21.	May 2002	Rome	Clay	(Spain) Virginia Ruano Pascual	(Spain) Conchita Martínez (Argentina) Patricia Tarabini	6–3, 6–4
Win	22.	Jun 2002	French Open	Clay	(Spain) Virginia Ruano Pascual	(United States) Lisa Raymond (Australia) Rennae Stubbs	6–4, 6–2
Loss	11.	Jun 2002	Wimbledon	Grass	(Spain) Virginia Ruano Pascual	(United States) Serena Williams (United States) Venus Williams	6–2, 7–5
Win	23.	Aug 2002	Montreal	Hard	(Spain) Virginia Ruano Pascual	(Japan) Rika Fujiwara (Japan) Ai Sugiyama	6–4, 7–6^{(7–4)}
Win	24.	Sep 2002	US Open	Hard	(Spain) Virginia Ruano Pascual	(Russia) Elena Dementieva (Slovakia) Janette Husárová	6–2, 6–1
Win	25.	Sep 2002	Bahia	Hard	(Spain) Virginia Ruano Pascual	(France) Émilie Loit (Paraguay) Rossana de los Ríos	6–4, 6–1
Loss	12.	Sep 2002	Leipzig	Carpet	(Slovakia) Janette Husárová	(United States) Alexandra Stevenson (United States) Serena Williams	6–3, 7–5
Loss	13.	Oct 2002	Filderstadt	Hard (i)	(United States) Meghann Shaughnessy	(United States) Lindsay Davenport (United States) Lisa Raymond	6–2, 6–4
Loss	14.	Jan 2003	Australian Open	Hard	(Spain) Virginia Ruano Pascual	(United States) Serena Williams (United States) Venus Williams	4–6, 6–4, 6–3
Win	26.	Apr 2003	Charleston	Clay	(Spain) Virginia Ruano Pascual	(Slovakia) Janette Husárová (Spain) Conchita Martínez	6–0, 6–3
Loss	15.	Apr 2003	Amelia Island	Clay	(Spain) Virginia Ruano Pascual	(United States) Lindsay Davenport (United States) Lisa Raymond	7–5, 6–2
Win	27.	May 2003	Berlin	Clay	(Spain) Virginia Ruano Pascual	(Belgium) Kim Clijsters (Japan) Ai Sugiyama	6–3, 4–6, 6–4
Loss	16.	Jun 2003	French Open	Clay	(Spain) Virginia Ruano Pascual	(Belgium) Kim Clijsters (Japan) Ai Sugiyama	6–7^{(5–7)}, 6–2, 9–7
Loss	17.	Jul 2003	Wimbledon	Grass	(Spain) Virginia Ruano Pascual	(Belgium) Kim Clijsters (Japan) Ai Sugiyama	6–4, 6–4
Win	28.	Aug 2003	New Haven	Hard	(Spain) Virginia Ruano Pascual	(Australia) Alicia Molik (Spain) Magüi Serna	7–6^{(8–6)}, 6–3
Win	29.	Sep 2003	US Open	Hard	(Spain) Virginia Ruano Pascual	(Russia) Svetlana Kuznetsova (United States) Martina Navratilova	6–2, 6–3
Loss	18.	Oct 2003	Zürich	Hard (i)	(Spain) Virginia Ruano Pascual	(Belgium) Kim Clijsters (Japan) Ai Sugiyama	7–6^{(7–3)}, 6–2
Win	30.	Nov 2003	Los Angeles	Hard (i)	(Spain) Virginia Ruano Pascual	(Belgium) Kim Clijsters (Japan) Ai Sugiyama	6–4, 3–6, 6–3
Loss	19.	Jan 2004	Auckland	Hard	(Spain) Virginia Ruano Pascual	(Bosnia and Herzegovina) Mervana Jugić-Salkić (Croatia) Jelena Kostanić Tošić	7–6^{(8–6)}, 3–6, 6–1
Win	31.	Feb 2004	Australian Open	Hard	(Spain) Virginia Ruano Pascual	(Russia) Svetlana Kuznetsova (Russia) Elena Likhovtseva	6–4, 6–3
Win	32.	Mar 2004	Indian Wells	Hard	(Spain) Virginia Ruano Pascual	(Russia) Svetlana Kuznetsova (Russia) Elena Likhovtseva	6–1, 6–2
Win	33.	Apr 2004	Charleston	Clay	(Spain) Virginia Ruano Pascual	(United States) Martina Navratilova (United States) Lisa Raymond	6–4, 6–1
Loss	20.	May 2004	Rome	Clay	(Spain) Virginia Ruano Pascual	(Russia) Nadia Petrova (United States) Meghann Shaughnessy	2–6, 6–3, 6–3
Win	34.	Jun 2004	French Open	Clay	(Spain) Virginia Ruano Pascual	(Russia) Svetlana Kuznetsova (Russia) Elena Likhovtseva	6–0, 6–3
Loss	21.	Jul 2004	San Diego	Hard	(Spain) Virginia Ruano Pascual	(Zimbabwe) Cara Black (Australia) Rennae Stubbs	4–6, 6–1, 6–4
Win	35.	Sep 2004	US Open	Hard	(Spain) Virginia Ruano Pascual	(Russia) Svetlana Kuznetsova (United States) Martina Navratilova	6–4, 7–5
Loss	22.	Oct 2004	Moscow	Carpet	(Spain) Virginia Ruano Pascual	(Russia) Anastasia Myskina (Russia) Vera Zvonareva	6–3, 4–6, 6–2
Loss	23.	Oct 2004	Zürich	Hard (i)	(Spain) Virginia Ruano Pascual	(Zimbabwe) Cara Black (Australia) Rennae Stubbs	6–4, 6–4
Win	36.	Oct 2004	Luxembourg City	Hard (i)	(Spain) Virginia Ruano Pascual	(United States) Jill Craybas (Germany) Marlene Weingärtner	6–1, 6–7^{(1–7)}, 6–3
Win	37.	Mar 2005	Dubai	Hard	(Spain) Virginia Ruano Pascual	(Russia) Svetlana Kuznetsova (Australia) Alicia Molik	6–7^{(7–9)}, 6–2, 6–1
Win	38.	Mar 2005	Indian Wells	Hard	(Spain) Virginia Ruano Pascual	(Russia) Nadia Petrova (United States) Meghann Shaughnessy	7–6^{(7–3)}, 6–1
Win	39.	Jun 2005	French Open	Clay	(Spain) Virginia Ruano Pascual	(Zimbabwe) Cara Black (South Africa) Liezel Huber	4–6, 6–3, 6–3
Loss	24.	Jan 2006	Sydney	Hard	(Spain) Virginia Ruano Pascual	(United States) Corina Morariu (Australia) Rennae Stubbs	6–3, 5–7, 6–2
Loss	25.	Jul 2006	Wimbledon	Grass	(Spain) Virginia Ruano Pascual	(China) Zheng Jie (China) Yan Zi	6–3, 3–6, 6–2
Win	40.	Aug 2006	Los Angeles	Hard	(Spain) Virginia Ruano Pascual	(Slovakia) Daniela Hantuchová (Japan) Ai Sugiyama	6–3, 6–4
Win	41.	Sep 2006	Beijing	Hard	(Spain) Virginia Ruano Pascual	(Russia) Anna Chakvetadze (Russia) Elena Vesnina	6–2, 6–4
Win	42.	Oct 2006	Seoul	Hard	(Spain) Virginia Ruano Pascual	(Chinese Taipei) Chuang Chia-jung (Argentina) Mariana Díaz Oliva	6–2, 6–3
Win	43.	Jan 2007	Auckland	Hard	(Slovakia) Janette Husárová	(Chinese Taipei) Hsieh Su-wei (India) Shikha Uberoi	6–0, 6–2
Win	44.	Feb 2007	Bogotá	Clay	(Spain) Lourdes Domínguez Lino	(Italy) Flavia Pennetta (Italy) Roberta Vinci	1–6, 6–3, [11–9]

== ITF Circuit finals ==
Legend
$50,000 tournaments
$25,000 tournaments
$10,000 tournaments

=== Singles (12–4) ===
Result	No.	Date	Location	Surface	Opponent	Score
Win	1.	14 October 1991	Buenos Aires, Argentina	Clay	(Argentina) María Luciana Reynares	2–6, 7–6, 6–1
Win	2.	4 November 1991	Florianópolis, Brazil	Clay	(Argentina) Cintia Tortorella	6–3, 6–3
Loss	1.	24 November 1991	Novo Hamburgo, Brazil	Clay	(Moldova) Svetlana Komleva	2–6, 5–7
Win	3.	27 April 1992	Lerida, Spain	Clay	(France) Sarah Pitkowski-Malcor	4–6, 6–4, 6–1
Win	4.	4 May 1992	Balaguer, Spain	Clay	(Bulgaria) Svetlana Krivencheva	3–6, 6–3, 6–0
Win	5.	17 May 1992	Barcelona, Spain	Clay	(Australia) Catherine Barclay	6–4, 6–1
Win	6.	18 May 1992	Tortosa, Spain	Clay	(Ukraine) Irina Sukhova	3–6, 6–4, 6–1
Win	7.	21 November 1992	La Plata, Argentina	Clay	(Belgium) Vanessa Matthys	7–6, 6–3
Loss	2.	23 October 1995	Buenos Aires, Argentina	Clay	(Argentina) Mariana Díaz Oliva	6–2, 4–6, 3–6
Win	8.	19 November 1995	Buenos Aires, Argentina	Clay	(Brazil) Miriam D'Agostini	6–2, 6–1
Loss	3.	17 December 1995	Tacuman, Argentina	Clay	(Argentina) Florencia Labat	2–6, 1–6
Win	9.	11 October 1998	Santiago, Chile	Clay	(Spain) Conchita Martínez Granados	3–6, 6–4, 6–1
Win	10.	25 October 1998	Montevideo, Uruguay	Clay	(Italy) Antonella Serra Zanetti	7–5, 6–4
Loss	4.	8 November 1998	Mogi das Cruzes, Brazil	Clay	(Slovakia) Janette Husárová	2–6, 6–2, 1–6
Win	11.	22 November 1998	Buenos Aires, Argentina	Clay	(Romania) Andreea Ehritt-Vanc	4–6, 6–1, 6–4
Win	12.	19 September 1999	Buenos Aires, Argentina	Clay	(Argentina) Florencia Labat	6–0, 7–5

=== Doubles (7–6) ===
Result	No.	Date	Location	Surface	Partner	Opponents	Score
Loss	1.	27 October 1991	Asunción, Paraguay	Clay	(Argentina) Pamela Zingman	(Poland) Karolina Bulat (Poland) Katarzyna Malec	5–7, 4–6
Loss	2.	24 November 1991	Novo Hamburgo, Brazil	Clay	(Argentina) Pamela Zingman	(Russia) Maria Marfina (Moldova) Svetlana Komleva	4–6, 3–6
Loss	3.	4 May 1992	Balaguer, Spain	Clay	(Argentina) Pamela Zingman	(Bulgaria) Svetlana Krivencheva (Ukraine) Irina Sukhova	6–4, 4–6, 4–6
Win	1.	11 May 1992	Barcelona, Spain	Hard	(Argentina) Pamela Zingman	(Spain) Rosa Bielsa (Spain) Gala León García	6–4, 6–2
Win	2.	11 October 1993	Santiago, Chile	Clay	(Argentina) Pamela Zingman	(Chile) Bárbara Castro (Ecuador) María Dolores Campana	6–1, 3–6, 6–0
Win	3.	23 October 1995	Buenos Aires, Argentina	Clay	(Argentina) Cintia Tortorella	(Argentina) Mariana Lopez Palacios (Argentina) Mariana Díaz Oliva	6–2, 6–2
Loss	4.	13 November 1995	Buenos Aires, Argentina	Clay	(Argentina) Florencia Cianfagna	(Hungary) Katalin Marosi (Brazil) Miriam D'Agostini	7–6^{(4)}, 0–6, 3–6
Win	4.	17 December 1995	Tucumán, Argentina	Clay	(Argentina) Laura Montalvo	(Paraguay) Larissa Schaerer (Argentina) Veronica Stele	6–2, 7–6^{(4)}
Win	5.	11 February 1996	Mar del Plata, Argentina	Hard	(Argentina) Laura Montalvo	(Austria) Marion Maruska (France) Noëlle van Lottum	6–3, 6–1
Loss	5.	12 October 1997	Sedona, United States	Hard	(United States) Liezel Huber	(Romania) Cătălina Cristea (United States) Corina Morariu	5–7, 2–6
Win	6.	5 October 1998	Santiago, Chile	Clay	(Argentina) Laura Montalvo	(Brazil) Miriam D'Agostini (Hungary) Katalin Marosi	6–1, 6–2
Win	7.	19 October 1998	Montevideo, Uruguay	Clay	(Argentina) Laura Montalvo	(Spain) Eva Bes (Argentina) María Fernanda Landa	6–2, 6–2
Loss	6.	13 September 1999	Buenos Aires, Argentina	Clay	(Argentina) Laura Montalvo	(Argentina) Paula Racedo (Switzerland) Aliénor Tricerri	w/o

== Performance timelines ==
Key
W	F	SF	QF	#R	RR	Q#	P#	DNQ	A	Z#	PO	G	S	B	NMS	NTI	P	NH

(W) winner; (F) finalist; (SF) semifinalist; (QF) quarterfinalist; (#R) rounds 4, 3, 2, 1; (RR) round-robin stage; (Q#) qualification round; (P#) preliminary round; (DNQ) did not qualify; (A) absent; (Z#) Davis/Fed Cup Zonal Group (with number indication) or (PO) play-off; (G) gold, (S) silver or (B) bronze Olympic/Paralympic medal; (NMS) not a Masters tournament; (NTI) not a Tier I tournament; (P) postponed; (NH) not held; (SR) strike rate (events won / competed); (W–L) win–loss record.

=== Singles ===
Tournament	1994	1995	1996	1997	1998	1999	2000	2001	2002	2003	2004	2005	2006	2007
Grand Slam tournaments
Australian Open	A	A	A	2R	2R	1R	1R	4R	1R	3R	3R	A	A	LQ
French Open	1R	2R	2R	1R	2R	2R	1R	2R	QF	3R	SF	1R	A	LQ
Wimbledon	1R	A	1R	1R	1R	1R	3R	1R	1R	4R	QF	A	A	LQ
US Open	2R	1R	2R	3R	1R	2R	1R	1R	2R	QF	3R	A	A	LQ

=== Doubles ===
Tournament	1994	1995	1996	1997	1998	1999	2000	2001	2002	2003	2004	2005	2006	2007	...	2012	SR	W–L
Grand Slam tournaments
Australian Open	A	A	A	QF	2R	2R	2R	QF	3R	F	W	A	QF	1R		A	1 / 10	23–9
French Open	A	A	1R	1R	2R	2R	F	W	W	F	W	W	2R	1R		2R	4 / 13	38–9
Wimbledon	A	A	1R	1R	2R	3R	QF	SF	F	F	SF	A	F	1R		1R	0 / 12	29–12
US Open	A	A	1R	2R	SF	2R	1R	3R	W	W	W	A	QF	1R		A	3 / 11	28–8
Win–loss	0–0	0–0	0–3	4–4	7–4	5–4	9–4	15–3	19–2	20–3	21–1	6–0	11–4	0–4		1–2	8 / 46	118–38
Olympic Games
Summer Olympics	Not Held		A	Not Held			2R	Not Held			SF-B	Not Held				1R	0 / 4	6–4
Year-end championships
Tour Championships	A	A	A	A	A	A	QF	SF	QF	W	SF	A	A	A		A	1 / 5	3–4

== Record against top-10 players ==
Suárez's match record against players who have been ranked in the top 10, with those who have been ranked No. 1 in boldface

- (Switzerland) Patty Schnyder 5–4
- (France) Mary Pierce 4–2
- (Austria) Barbara Schett 3–2
- (Australia) Jelena Dokic 2–0
- (Russia) Anna Kournikova 2–0
- (Russia) Svetlana Kuznetsova 2–0
- (Australia) Alicia Molik 2–0
- (Russia) **Dinara Safina** 2–0
- (Slovakia) Daniela Hantuchová 2–1
- (Italy) Francesca Schiavone 2–1
- (Russia) Nadia Petrova 2–2
- (France) Sandrine Testud 2–2
- (Bulgaria) Magdalena Maleeva 2–3
- (France) **Amélie Mauresmo** 2–3
- (Japan) Ai Sugiyama 2–3
- (Russia) Vera Zvonareva 2–3
- (Germany) Anke Huber 1–0
- (Russia) Maria Kirilenko 1–0
- (Austria) Barbara Paulus 1–0
- (Czech Republic) Lucie Šafářová 1–0
- (Russia) **Maria Sharapova** 1–0
- (France) Nathalie Tauziat 1–0
- (Hungary) Andrea Temesvári 1–0
- (United States) **Serena Williams** 1–0
- (Serbia) **Jelena Janković** 1–1
- (Croatia) Iva Majoli 1–1
- (Russia) Anastasia Myskina 1–1
- (United States) Mary Joe Fernández 1–2
- (United States) Chanda Rubin 1–2
- (Russia) Elena Dementieva 1–3
- (South Africa) Amanda Coetzer 1–5
- (Belarus) **Victoria Azarenka** 0–1
- (Russia) Anna Chakvetadze 0–1
- (United States) Zina Garrison 0–1
- (France) Julie Halard-Decugis 0–1
- (Belgium) **Justine Henin** 0–1
- (Netherlands) Brenda Schultz-McCarthy 0–1
- (Romania) Irina Spîrlea 0–1
- (Czech Republic) Helena Suková 0–1
- (France) Marion Bartoli 0–2
- (Spain) Conchita Martínez 0–2
- (United States) **Monica Seles** 0–2
- (United States) **Venus Williams** 0–2
- (Belarus) Natasha Zvereva 0–2
- (United States) **Jennifer Capriati** 0–3
- (Belgium) **Kim Clijsters** 0–3
- (Germany) **Steffi Graf** 0–3
- (Belgium) Dominique Monami 0–4
- (Spain) **Arantxa Sánchez Vicario** 0–4
- (United States) **Lindsay Davenport** 0–7
