= Rebecca Jensen =

American tennis player

- Country (sports): United States
- Born: November 19, 1972 (age 52)
- Prize money: $43,951

Singles
- Career record: 22–44
- Career titles: 0
- Highest ranking: No. 556 (October 21, 1996)

Doubles
- Career record: 104–114
- Career titles: 7 ITF
- Highest ranking: No. 116 (February 20, 1995)

Grand Slam doubles results
- Australian Open: 1R (1995)
- US Open: 2R (1994)

Grand Slam mixed doubles results
- Wimbledon: 2R (1995)
- US Open: 1R (1997)

Rebecca Diianni (born November 19, 1972) is a former professional tennis player from the United States. She competed during her career under her maiden name Rebecca Jensen.

== Biography ==
Jensen grew up in Ludington, Michigan and in the early 1990s played collegiate tennis at the University of Kansas. In 1993, she became the first Kansas player to be named both a singles and doubles All-American in the same season, then in 1994 partnered with Nóra Köves to win the NCAA Doubles Championship.

From 1994 she competed professionally, joining twin sister Rachel as well as elder brothers Luke and Murphy on tour. A doubles specialist, she partnered all three sibling in a Grand Slam main-draw during her seven-year career, reaching a best ranking of 116 in the world.

Jensen retired from professional tennis in 2000 and now lives in Atlanta, Georgia.
