= 1995 Fed Cup Americas Zone =

Subsection of tennis competition

The Americas Zone was one of three zones of regional competition in the 1995 Fed Cup.

== Group I ==
- Venue: Caracos Sports Club, Caracas, Venezuela (outdoor hard)
- Date: 11–15 April

The eight teams were divided into two pools of four teams. The top two teams of each pool play-off in a two-round knockout stage to decide which nation progresses to World Group II play-offs. Nations finishing in the bottom place in each pool were relegated to Americas Zone Group II for 1996.

=== Pools ===
	Pool A	MEX	COL	VEN	PER
1	Mexico (3–0)		2–1	2–1	3–0
2	Colombia (2–1)	1–2		2–1	2–1
3	Venezuela (1–2)	1–2	1–2		3–0
4	Peru (0–3)	0–3	1–2	0–3	

	Pool B	PAR	BRA	CHI	CUB
1	Paraguay (3–0)		2–1	3–0	3–0
2	Brazil (2–1)	1–2		2–1	2–1
3	Chile (1–2)	0–3	1–2		2–1
4	Cuba (0–3)	0–3	1–2	1–2	

=== Knockout stage ===
Semifinals; 14 April
Mexico	2
Colombia	0
Brazil	0
Paraguay	2

Final; 15 April
Mexico	0
Paraguay	2

- Paraguay advanced to World Group II Play-offs.
- Peru and Cuba relegated to Group II in 1996.

== Group II ==
- Venue: Trinidad C.C., Maraval, Port of Spain, Trinidad and Tobago (outdoor hard)
- Date: 27–30 March

The twelve teams were divided into four pools of three. The top team from each pool then moved on to the play-off stage of the competition. The two teams that won one match from the play-off stage would advance to Group I for 1996.

=== Pools ===
	Pool A	URU	ESA	GUA
1	Uruguay (2–0)		3–0	3–0
2	El Salvador (1–1)	0–3		3–0
3	Guatemala (0–2)	0–3	0–3	

	Pool B	ECU	CRC	BAR
1	Ecuador (2–0)		3–0	3–0
2	Costa Rica (1–1)	0–3		3–0
3	Barbados (0–2)	0–3	0–3	

	Pool C	BOL	JAM	DOM
1	Bolivia (2–0)		2–1	3–0
2	Jamaica (1–1)	1–2		3–0
3	Dominican Republic (0–2)	0–3	0–3	

	Pool D	PUR	TRI	BAH
1	Puerto Rico (2–0)		3–0	2–1
2	Trinidad and Tobago (1–1)	0–3		2–1
3	Bahamas (0–2)	1–2	1–2	

=== Play-offs ===
Winning team	Score	Losing team
Uruguay	2–1	Bolivia
Puerto Rico	2–1	Ecuador

- Uruguay and Puerto Rico promoted to Americas Group I in 1996.

== See also ==
- Fed Cup structure
