= 1995 Fed Cup Americas Zone Group II – play-offs =

The play-offs of the 1995 Fed Cup Americas Zone Group II were the final stages of the Group II Zonal Competition involving teams from the Americas. Those that qualified for this stage placed first in their respective pools.

Placing	Pool A	Pool B	Pool C	Pool D
1	Uruguay	Ecuador	Bolivia	Puerto Rico
2	El Salvador	Costa Rica	Jamaica	Trinidad and Tobago
3	Guatemala	Barbados	Dominican Republic	Bahamas

The four teams were then paired up the team from a different placing of the other group for a play-off tie, with the winners being promoted to Group I in 1996.

== Uruguay vs. Bolivia ==
Uruguay
2
Trinidad C.C., Maraval, Port of Spain, Trinidad and Tobago
30 March 1995
Hard (outdoors)

Bolivia
1

			1	2	3
1	(Uruguay) (Bolivia)	Claudia Brause; Carla Jiménez	6; 3	6; 4
2	(Uruguay) (Bolivia)	María Eugenia Fernández; Cecilia Ampuero	2; 6	1; 6
3	(Uruguay) (Bolivia)	Claudia Brause / María Eugenia Fernández; Cecilia Ampuero / Carla Jiménez	3; 6	6; 4	7; 5

- Uruguay advanced to Group I in 1996, where they placed last in their pool of four and as such were relegated back to Group II for 1997.

== Puerto Rico vs. Ecuador ==
Puerto Rico
2
Trinidad C.C., Maraval, Port of Spain, Trinidad and Tobago
30 March 1995
Hard (outdoors)

Ecuador
1

			1	2	3
1	(Puerto Rico) (Ecuador)	Tari Ann Toró; Alexandra Guzmán	7; 5	4; 6	4; 6
2	(Puerto Rico) (Ecuador)	Emilie Viqueira; María Dolores Campana	6; 1	6; 3
3	(Puerto Rico) (Ecuador)	Tari Ann Toró / Emilie Viqueira; María Dolores Campana / Nuria Niemes	7; 5	2; 6	7; 5

- Puerto Rico advanced to Group I in 1996, where they placed third in their pool of four.

== See also ==
- Fed Cup structure
