= 1995 Fed Cup Americas Zone Group I – Pool B =

International tennis competition

Group B of the 1995 Fed Cup Americas Zone Group I was one of two pools in the Americas Zone Group I of the 1995 Fed Cup. Four teams competed in a round robin competition, with the top two teams advancing to the knockout stage and the bottom team being relegated down to Group II for 1996.

	(Paraguay) PAR	(Brazil) BRA	(Chile) CHI	(Cuba) CUB	RR; W–L	Set; W–L	Game; W–L	Standings
Paraguay		2–1	3–0	3–0	3–0	16–4	113–65	1
Brazil	1–2		2–1	2–1	2–1	13–10	111–101	2
Chile	0–3	1–2		2–1	1–2	9–14	106–120	3
Cuba	0–3	1–2	1–2		0–3	6–16	87–121	4

== Paraguay vs. Cuba ==
Paraguay
3
Caracas Sports Club, Caracas, Venezuela
11 April 1995
Hard (outdoors)

Cuba
0

			1	2	3
1	(Paraguay) (Cuba)	Magalí Benítez; Belkis Rodríguez	6; 1	6; 3
2	(Paraguay) (Cuba)	Larissa Schaerer; Yoannis Montesino	6; 1	6; 2
3	(Paraguay) (Cuba)	Magalí Benítez / Larissa Schaerer; Yoannis Montesino / Belkis Rodríguez	6; 4	6; 2

== Brazil vs. Chile ==
Brazil
2
Caracas Sports Club, Caracas, Venezuela
11 April 1995
Hard (outdoors)

Chile
1

			1	2	3
1	(Brazil) (Chile)	Patrícia Segala; Bárbara Castro	4; 6	6; 2	6; 3
2	(Brazil) (Chile)	Miriam D'Agostini; Paula Cabezas	7^{7} 6^{3}	6; 4
3	(Brazil) (Chile)	Miriam D'Agostini / Vanessa Menga; Paula Cabezas / Bárbara Castro	6; 3	2; 6	3; 6

== Paraguay vs. Chile ==
Paraguay
3
Caracas Sports Club, Caracas, Venezuela
12 April 1995
Hard (outdoors)

Chile
0

			1	2	3
1	(Paraguay) (Chile)	Magalí Benítez; Bárbara Castro	6; 4	7^{7} 6^{3}
2	(Paraguay) (Chile)	Larissa Schaerer; Paula Cabezas	6; 3	6; 0
3	(Paraguay) (Chile)	Magalí Benítez / Larissa Schaerer; Paula Cabezas / Bárbara Castro	4; 6	6; 2	6; 2

== Brazil vs. Cuba ==
Brazil
2
Caracas Sports Club, Caracas, Venezuela
12 April 1995
Hard (outdoors)

Cuba
1

			1	2	3
1	(Brazil) (Cuba)	Patrícia Segala; Belkis Rodríguez	1; 6	6; 3	5; 7
2	(Brazil) (Cuba)	Miriam D'Agostini; Yoannis Montesino	6; 3	6; 2
3	(Brazil) (Cuba)	Miriam D'Agostini / Vanessa Menga; Yoannis Montesino / Belkis Rodríguez	5; 7	6; 2	7; 5

== Paraguay vs. Brazil ==
Paraguay
2
Caracas Sports Club, Caracas, Venezuela
13 April 1995
Hard (outdoors)

Brazil
1

			1	2	3
1	(Paraguay) (Brazil)	Magalí Benítez; Vanessa Menga	5; 7	3; 6
2	(Paraguay) (Brazil)	Larissa Schaerer; Patrícia Segala	6; 1	6; 2
3	(Paraguay) (Brazil)	Ana Valeria Rolón / Larissa Schaerer; Miriam D'Agostini / Vanessa Menga	6; 3	4; 6	6; 4

== Chile vs. Cuba ==
Chile
2
Caracas Sports Club, Caracas, Venezuela
13 April 1995
Hard (outdoors)

Cuba
1

			1	2	3
1	(Chile) (Cuba)	Bárbara Castro; Belkis Rodríguez	7; 5	4; 6	6; 1
2	(Chile) (Cuba)	Paula Cabezas; Yoannis Montesino	7^{7} 6^{2}	7^{7} 6^{2}
3	(Chile) (Cuba)	Karem Harboe / María-Alejandra Quezada; Yamile Cordova / Yoannis Montesino	6^{5} 7^{7}	6; 2	3; 6

- Cuba placed last in the pool, and thus was relegated to Group II in 1996, where they placed second in their pool of seven.

== See also ==
- Fed Cup structure
