= 1995 Fed Cup Americas Zone Group II – Pool B =

International tennis competition

Group B of the 1995 Fed Cup Americas Zone Group II was one of two pools in the Americas Zone Group I of the 1995 Fed Cup. Four teams competed in a round robin competition, with the top two teams advancing to the knockout stage and the bottom team being relegated down to Group II for 1996.

	(Ecuador) ECU	(Costa Rica) CRC	(Barbados) BAR	RR; W–L	Set; W–L	Game; W–L	Standings
Ecuador		3–0	3–0	2–0	12–1	76–26	1
Costa Rica	0–3		3–0	1–1	7–6	54–49	2
Barbados	0–3	0–3		0–2	0–12	17–72	3

== Costa Rica vs. Barbados ==
Costa Rica
3
Trinidad C.C., Maraval, Port of Spain, Trinidad and Tobago
27 March 1995
Hard (outdoors)

Barbados
0

			1	2	3
1	(Costa Rica) (Barbados)	Melissa Golfin; Kyla Hunte	6; 1	6; 0
2	(Costa Rica) (Barbados)	Paula Umaña; Jennifer Carter	6; 1	6; 3
3	(Costa Rica) (Barbados)	Melissa Golfin / Paula Umaña; Jennifer Carter / Susan King	6; 2	6; 2

== Ecuador vs. Costa Rica ==
Ecuador
3
Trinidad C.C., Maraval, Port of Spain, Trinidad and Tobago
28 March 1995
Hard (outdoors)

Costa Rica
0

			1	2	3
1	(Ecuador) (Costa Rica)	Alexandra Guzmán; Melissa Golfin	6; 1	6; 2
2	(Ecuador) (Costa Rica)	María Dolores Campana; Paula Umaña	4; 6	6; 2	6; 0
3	(Ecuador) (Costa Rica)	Alexandra Guzmán / Nuria Niemes; Melissa Golfin / Paula Umaña	6; 3	6; 4

== Ecuador vs. Barbados ==
Ecuador
3
Trinidad C.C., Maraval, Port of Spain, Trinidad and Tobago
29 March 1995
Hard (outdoors)

Barbados
0

			1	2	3
1	(Ecuador) (Barbados)	Nuria Niemes; Kyla Hunte	6; 3	6; 4
2	(Ecuador) (Barbados)	María Dolores Campana; Jennifer Carter	6; 1	6; 0
3	(Ecuador) (Barbados)	María Dolores Campana / Nuria Niemes; Jennifer Carter / Kyla Hunte	6; 0	6; 0

== See also ==
- Fed Cup structure
