= 1995 Fed Cup Americas Zone Group II – Pool A =

Group A of the 1995 Fed Cup Americas Zone Group II was one of two pools in the Americas Zone Group I of the 1995 Fed Cup. Four teams competed in a round robin competition, with the top two teams advancing to the knockout stage and the bottom team being relegated down to Group II for 1996.

	(Uruguay) URU	(El Salvador) ESA	(Guatemala) GUA	RR; W–L	Set; W–L	Game; W–L	Standings
Uruguay		3–0	3–0	2–0	12–0	74–33	1
El Salvador	0–3		3–0	1–1	6–7	56–45	2
Guatemala	0–3	0–3		0–2	1–12	34–76	3

== Uruguay vs. Guatemala ==
Uruguay
3
Trinidad C.C., Maraval, Port of Spain, Trinidad and Tobago
27 March 1995
Hard (outdoors)

Guatemala
0

			1	2	3
1	(Uruguay) (Guatemala)	Claudia Brause; Lily Aguirre	6; 2	6; 2
2	(Uruguay) (Guatemala)	María Eugenia Fernández; Florea de María Urrea	7^{8} 6^{6}	6; 2
3	(Uruguay) (Guatemala)	Claudia Brause / María Eugenia Fernández; Ana Rojas / Florea de María Urrea	6; 3	6; 1

== Uruguay vs. El Salvador ==
Uruguay
3
Trinidad C.C., Maraval, Port of Spain, Trinidad and Tobago
28 March 1995
Hard (outdoors)

El Salvador
0

			1	2	3
1	(Uruguay) (El Salvador)	Claudia Brause; Annette Falkenberg	6; 4	6; 1
2	(Uruguay) (El Salvador)	María Eugenia Fernández; Ingrid González	6; 0	6; 2
3	(Uruguay) (El Salvador)	María Eugenia Fernández / Elena Juricich; Luciana Alfaro / Carolina Molins	7^{7} 6^{5}	6; 4

== El Salvador vs. Guatemala ==
El Salvador
3
Trinidad C.C., Maraval, Port of Spain, Trinidad and Tobago
29 March 1995
Hard (outdoors)

Guatemala
0

			1	2	3
1	(El Salvador) (Guatemala)	Annette Falkenberg; Lily Aguirre	6; 2	6; 2
2	(El Salvador) (Guatemala)	Ingrid González; Florea de María Urrea	6; 1	6; 0
3	(El Salvador) (Guatemala)	Luciana Alfaro / Carolina Molins; Ana Rojas / Florea de María Urrea	3; 6	6; 3	6; 4

== See also ==
- Fed Cup structure
