= Elias Constantine =

Trinidadian cricketer (1912–2003)

Personal information
- Full name: Elias Constantine
- Born: 22 May 1912; Cascade, Port of Spain, Trinidad
- Died: 22 May 2003 (aged 91); D'Abadie, Trinidad
- Batting: Right-handed
- Bowling: Right-arm medium
- Relatives: Lebrun Constantine (father); Learie Constantine (brother); Victor Pascall (uncle)

Domestic team information
- Years: Team
- 1932–1949: Trinidad

Career statistics
Competition	First-class
Matches	21
Runs scored	895
Batting average	27.12
100s/50s	1/3
Top score	139
Balls bowled	1,987
Wickets	24
Bowling average	36.33
5 wickets in innings	0
10 wickets in match	0
Best bowling	4/14
Catches/stumpings	21/0
- Source: CricketArchive, 27 November 2011

Elias Constantine (22 May 1912 – 22 May 2003) was a Trinidadian cricketer who played first-class cricket for Trinidad between 1932 and 1949. He was the younger brother of Learie Constantine, who represented West Indies in Test matches; his father Lebrun and uncle Victor Pascall also played representative cricket for West Indies and Trinidad.

== Biography ==
Constantine's father, Lebrun, was the grandchild of slaves, who rose to the position of overseer on a cocoa estate in Cascade, near Maraval, where the family lived when Elias was born. Lebrun was famous on the island as a cricketer who represented Trinidad in first-class cricket and toured England twice with a West Indian team. Constantine's mother, Anaise Pascall, was the daughter of slaves;. Constantine grew up with his family in Cascade on the estates for which his father was overseer. The family were generally happy and frequently practised cricket together under the supervision of Lebrun and Victor Pascall.

By 1932, Constantine had followed his relations into the Trinidad cricket team. He made his first-class debut against Barbados on 16 January in the Inter-Colonial Tournament, and scored 30 in his only innings. He later bowled 11 wicketless overs in a comfortable Trinidad win. According to his obituary in Wisden Cricketers' Almanack, "he was so quick in the field that his team-mates reputedly congratulated him when he dropped a catch on his Trinidad debut, because no one else could have got close." In the following game, the final of the tournament, Constantine scored 92 not out and took his first two wickets in first-class cricket as Trinidad won the competition.

As matches in the West Indies were limited, Constantine played just once in each of the following two seasons, achieving nothing of note. In the following season, he played in one of the matches against the Marylebone Cricket Club which was touring West Indies. For the only time, he played a first-class match with his brother Learie. They opened the bowling together when their team fielded. When Trinidad batted, they were reduced to 42 for six before the brothers came together and added 93 runs, of which Elias made 37. The match was eventually drawn. During the Trinidad Test match, played shortly afterwards, Constantine was chosen as twelfth man purely because of his reputation as an outstanding fielder. In the first 11 years of his career, he only twice passed fifty in a first-class match, and he bowled infrequently. Even so, Learie Constantine hoped that Elias would be chosen for the 1939 West Indies tour of England. Elias even paid his own expenses to travel to the trial matches in Trinidad, but was not selected for them and he did not make the tour. In the mid-1930s, Constantine joined his brother in playing English league cricket; he appeared for Rochdale Cricket Club in the Central Lancashire Cricket League, playing as an all-rounder.

Constantine did not play any first-class cricket between 1936 and 1939. His best performance came in 1944, when he scored his only first-class hundred; he hit 139 runs against British Guiana, hitting five sixes. He continued to play for Trinidad until 1949; all but one of his first-class games were played for Trinidad. In total, he scored 895 runs at an average of 27.12 and took 24 wickets with his medium-paced bowling. He died in Trinidad on his 91st birthday on 22 May 2003.

== Bibliography ==
- Howat, Gerald (1976). Learie Constantine. Newton Abbot: Readers Union Limited.
- Mason, Peter (2008). Learie Constantine. Oxford: Signal Books Limited. ISBN 978-1-904955-42-9.
