= 1995 Fed Cup Americas Zone Group II – Pool D =

International tennis competition

Group D of the 1995 Fed Cup Americas Zone Group II was one of two pools in the Americas Zone Group I of the 1995 Fed Cup. Four teams competed in a round robin competition, with the top two teams advancing to the knockout stage and the bottom team being relegated down to Group II for 1996.

	(Puerto Rico) PUR	(Trinidad and Tobago) TRI	(The Bahamas) BAH	RR; W–L	Set; W–L	Game; W–L	Standings
Puerto Rico		3–0	2–1	2–0	10–4	71–32	1
Trinidad and Tobago	0–3		2–1	1–1	5–8	41–59	2
Bahamas	1–2	1–2		0–2	5–8	43–64	3

== Trinidad and Tobago vs. Bahamas ==
Trinidad and Tobago
2
Trinidad C.C., Maraval, Port of Spain, Trinidad and Tobago
27 March 1995
Hard (outdoors)

Bahamas
1

			1	2	3
1	(Trinidad and Tobago) (The Bahamas)	Beverly Corbie; Ann Simons	6; 0	6; 1
2	(Trinidad and Tobago) (The Bahamas)	Marianne Ward; Kim Cartwright	2; 6	6^{4} 7^{7}
3	(Trinidad and Tobago) (The Bahamas)	Jacinta Ayers / Beverly Corbie; Chris-Anne Aston / Kim Cartwright	6; 4	6; 2

== Puerto Rico vs. Bahamas ==
Puerto Rico
2
Trinidad C.C., Maraval, Port of Spain, Trinidad and Tobago
28 March 1995
Hard (outdoors)

Bahamas
1

			1	2	3
1	(Puerto Rico) (The Bahamas)	Vilmarie Castellvi; Ann Simons	3; 6	6; 2	6; 1
2	(Puerto Rico) (The Bahamas)	Emilie Viqueira; Kim Cartwright	6; 0	6; 2
3	(Puerto Rico) (The Bahamas)	Mónica Báez / Tari Ann Toró; Chris-Anne Aston / Kim Cartwright	4; 6	1; 6

== Puerto Rico vs. Trinidad and Tobago ==
Puerto Rico
3
Trinidad C.C., Maraval, Port of Spain, Trinidad and Tobago
29 March 1995
Hard (outdoors)

Trinidad and Tobago
0

			1	2	3
1	(Puerto Rico) (Trinidad and Tobago)	Vilmarie Castellvi; Beverly Corbie	3; 6	6; 2	6; 0
2	(Puerto Rico) (Trinidad and Tobago)	Emilie Viqueira; Marianne Ward	6; 0	6; 0
3	(Puerto Rico) (Trinidad and Tobago)	Tari Ann Toró / Emilie Viqueira; Jacinta Ayers / Catherine Campbell	6; 1	6; 0

== See also ==
- Fed Cup structure
