= 1995 Fed Cup Americas Zone Group II – Pool C =

International tennis competition

Group C of the 1995 Fed Cup Americas Zone Group II was one of two pools in the Americas Zone Group I of the 1995 Fed Cup. Four teams competed in a round robin competition, with the top two teams advancing to the knockout stage and the bottom team being relegated down to Group II for 1996.

	(Bolivia) BOL	(Jamaica) JAM	(Dominican Republic) DOM	RR; W–L	Set; W–L	Game; W–L	Standings
Bolivia		2–1	3–0	2–0	10–3	69–35	1
Jamaica	1–2		3–0	1–1	9–4	59–47	2
Dominican Republic	0–3	0–3		0–2	0–11	25–71	3

== Jamaica vs. Dominican Republic ==
Jamaica
3
Trinidad C.C., Maraval, Port of Spain, Trinidad and Tobago
27 March 1995
Hard (outdoors)

Dominican Republic
0

			1	2	3
1	(Jamaica) (Dominican Republic)	Sasha Hanna; Natalia García	6; 4	6; 3
2	(Jamaica) (Dominican Republic)	Joni Van Ryck De Groot; Mónika Pimentel	6; 3	6; 0
3	(Jamaica) (Dominican Republic)	Sasha Hanna / Joni Van Ryck De Groot; Natalia García / Mónika Pimentel	6; 2	6; 1

== Bolivia vs. Jamaica ==
Bolivia
2
Trinidad C.C., Maraval, Port of Spain, Trinidad and Tobago
28 March 1995
Hard (outdoors)

Jamaica
1

			1	2	3
1	(Bolivia) (Jamaica)	Carla Jiménez; Sasha Hanna	6^{5} 7^{7}	1; 6
2	(Bolivia) (Jamaica)	Cecilia Ampuero; Joni Van Ryck De Groot	6; 1	6; 0
3	(Bolivia) (Jamaica)	Cecilia Ampuero / Carla Jiménez; Sasha Hanna / Joni Van Ryck De Groot	6; 2	3; 6	6; 1

== Bolivia vs. Dominican Republic ==
Bolivia
3
Trinidad C.C., Maraval, Port of Spain, Trinidad and Tobago
29 March 1995
Hard (outdoors)

Dominican Republic
0

			1	2	3
1	(Bolivia) (Dominican Republic)	Carla Jiménez; Natalia García	6; 3	6; 1
2	(Bolivia) (Dominican Republic)	Cecilia Ampuero; Mónika Pimentel	6; 0	5; 1		retired
3	(Bolivia) (Dominican Republic)	Cecilia Ampuero / Carla Jiménez; Natalia García / Mónika Pimentel	6; 3	6; 4

== See also ==
- Fed Cup structure
