= Learie Constantine =

West Indian cricketer and politician

The Right Honourable The Lord Constantine MBE
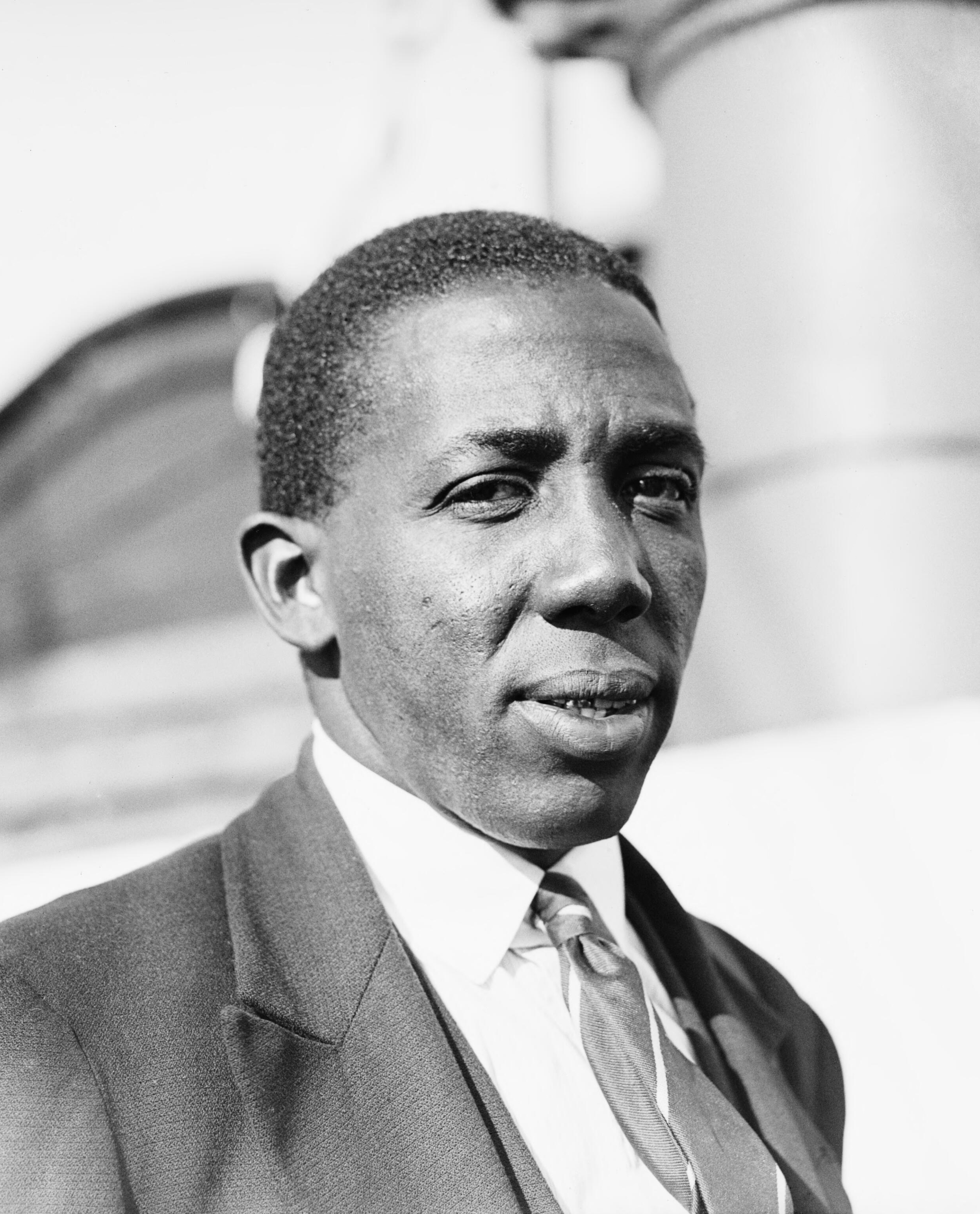
- Constantine in Australia in November 1930

Personal information
- Full name: Learie Nicholas Constantine
- Born: 21 September 1901; Petit Valley, Diego Martin, Trinidad and Tobago
- Died: 1 July 1971 (aged 69); Brondesbury, Hampstead, London, England
- Batting: Right-handed
- Bowling: Right-arm fast
- Role: All-rounder
- Relatives: Elias Constantine (brother); Lebrun Constantine (father); Victor Pascall (uncle)

International information
- National side: West Indies
- Test debut (cap 3): 23 June 1928 v England
- Last Test: 22 August 1939 v England

Domestic team information
- Years: Team
- 1921/22–1934/35: Trinidad and Tobago
- 1938/39: Barbados

Career statistics
Competition	Test	First-class
Matches	18	119
Runs scored	635	4,475
Batting average	19.24	24.05
100s/50s	0/4	5/28
Top score	90	133
Balls bowled	3,583	17,458
Wickets	58	439
Bowling average	30.10	20.48
5 wickets in innings	2	25
10 wickets in match	0	4
Best bowling	5/75	8/38
Catches/stumpings	28/–	133/–
- Source: CricketArchive, 23 March 2009

Learie Nicholas Constantine, Baron Constantine (21 September 1901 – 1 July 1971) was a Trinidadian cricketer, lawyer and politician who served as Trinidad and Tobago's High Commissioner to the United Kingdom and became the UK's first black peer. He played 18 Test matches for the West Indies before the Second World War and took the team's first wicket in Test cricket. An advocate against racial discrimination, in later life he was influential in the passing of the 1965 Race Relations Act in Britain. He was knighted in 1962 and made a life peer in 1969.

Born in Trinidad, Constantine established an early reputation as a promising cricketer, and was a member of the West Indies teams that toured England in 1923 and 1928. Unhappy at the lack of opportunities for black people in Trinidad, he decided to pursue a career as a professional cricketer in England, and during the 1928 tour was awarded a contract with the Lancashire League club Nelson. He played for the club with distinction between 1929 and 1938, while continuing as a member of the West Indies Test team in tours of England and Australia. Although his record as a Test cricketer was less impressive than in other cricket, he helped to establish a uniquely West Indian style of play. He was chosen as one of the Wisden Cricketers of the Year in 1939.

During the Second World War, Constantine worked for the Ministry of Labour and National Service as a Welfare Officer responsible for West Indians employed in English factories. In 1943, the manager of a London hotel refused to accommodate Constantine and his family on the grounds of their race in an instance of the UK colour bar; Constantine successfully sued the hotel company. Commentators recognise the case as a milestone in British racial equality. Constantine qualified as a barrister in 1954, while also establishing himself as a journalist and broadcaster. He returned to Trinidad and Tobago in 1954, entered politics and became a founding member of the People's National Movement, subsequently entering the government as minister of communications.

From 1961 to 1964, he served as High Commissioner to the United Kingdom and, controversially, became involved in issues relating to racial discrimination, including the Bristol Bus Boycott. In his final years, he served on the Race Relations Board, the Sports Council and the Board of Governors of the BBC. Failing health reduced his effectiveness in some of these roles, and he faced criticism for becoming a part of the British Establishment. He died of a heart attack on 1 July 1971, aged 69. In June 2021, he was inducted into the ICC Cricket Hall of Fame as one of the special inductees to mark the inaugural edition of the ICC World Test Championship final.

== Early life ==
Constantine was born in Petit Valley, a village close to Diego Martin in north-west Trinidad, on 21 September 1901, the second child of the family and the eldest of three brothers. His father, Lebrun Constantine, was the grandchild of slaves; Lebrun rose to the position of overseer on a cocoa estate in Cascade, near Maraval, where the family moved in 1906. Lebrun was famous on the island as a cricketer who represented Trinidad and Tobago in first-class cricket and toured England twice with a West Indian team. (Note: Learie Constantine was named after an Irishman whom his father met and befriended on his first tour of England in 1900.) Constantine's mother, Anaise Pascall, was the daughter of slaves, and her brother Victor, was also a Trinidad and Tobago and West Indian first-class cricketer; a third family member, Constantine's brother Elias, later represented Trinidad and Tobago. Constantine wrote that although the family was not wealthy, his childhood was happy. He spent a lot of time playing in the hills near his home or on the estates where his father and grandfather worked. He enjoyed cricket from an early age; the family regularly practised together under the supervision of Lebrun and Victor Pascall.

Constantine first went to the St Ann's Government School in Port of Spain, then attended St Ann's Roman Catholic School until 1917. He displayed little enthusiasm for learning and never reached a high academic standard, but showed prowess at several sports and was respected for his cricketing lineage. He played for the school cricket team, which he captained in his last two years, by which time he was developing a reputation as an attacking batsman, a good fast-medium bowler and an excellent fielder. His father prohibited him from playing competitive club cricket until 1920 for fear of premature exposure to top-class opposition while too young; in addition, he first wanted his son to establish a professional career. Upon leaving school Constantine joined Jonathan Ryan, a firm of solicitors in Port of Spain, as a clerk. This was a possible route into the legal profession; however, as a member of the black lower-middle class, he was unlikely to progress far. Few black Trinidadians at this time became solicitors, and he faced many social restrictions owing to his colour.

== Cricket career ==
=== Cricket in Trinidad and Tobago ===
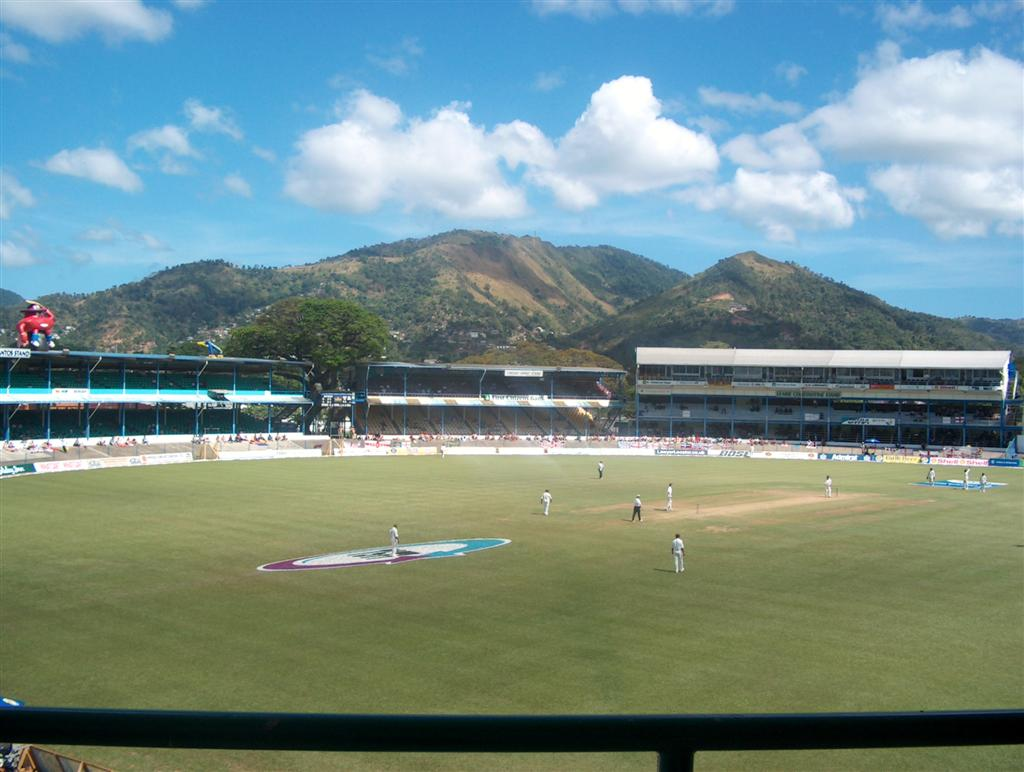
A modern photograph of Queen's Park Oval, Trinidad and Tobago's home ground

In 1916, before his father imposed a ban on competitive cricket, Constantine had played briefly for Shannon Cricket Club; he returned to the club in 1920. Initially, he appeared in the second team, but after scoring 50 runs in an hour during his third game, was promoted to the first eleven. Cricket in Trinidad and Tobago at the time was divided along racial lines; Shannon was mainly for black lower middle-class players such as teachers or clerks. The club was competitive and highly motivated, partly as a reaction to the racial discrimination that its players and supporters encountered in their daily lives. Constantine's cricket thrived in this atmosphere, and the club helped to form some of his political views. He particularly noticed that in Trinidad and Tobago and West Indies cricket, white and light-skinned players were often favoured over black players of greater ability.

Constantine's reputation continued to grow. An innings for Shannon in 1921 against renowned fast bowler George John received great local publicity, but according to the cricket writer and social historian C. L. R. James, this was the only time prior to 1928 that Constantine played in such an effective way. Constantine's father, still a formidable player, did not put himself forward for selection into the Trinidad and Tobago team in 1921, in the hope that his son would replace him. The white captain of the team, Major Bertie Harragin, recognised the younger Constantine's promise, and selected him to play in Trinidad and Tobago's Inter-Colonial Tournament match against British Guiana. Unfortunately, Constantine arrived late after a newspaper advertised the wrong starting time, and did not play. However, he made his first-class debut in the following match, the final of the tournament, against Barbados on 21 September 1921. He scored a duck in his first innings, batting at number eight in the batting order. After taking two wickets at a cost of 44 runs in Barbados' only innings, he scored 24 in his second innings, batting at number three.

Constantine played for Trinidad and Tobago in the next Inter-Colonial Tournament, in British Guiana in 1922. (Note: In the first game, Constantine opened the batting in the first innings with his uncle, Victor Pascall. In the second game, Lebrun Constantine joined Pascall and his son in the match, one of few first-class matches in which a father and son played together.) Although in two games he scored only 45 runs and took four wickets, commentators considered his fielding in the covers to be exceptional, and he retained his place in the team largely as a fielder. Although Trinidad and Tobago lost to Barbados in the final, the Barbados captain Harold Austin, who was also captain of the West Indies team, was impressed by Constantine. Mainly on the strength of his fielding, Austin secured Constantine's selection for the 1923 West Indian tour of England; it was a surprising choice, as there were other candidates who appeared to have stronger claims. By this time Constantine was working for Llewellyn Roberts, a larger solicitors' practice which paid better. As his new employer's longer working hours restricted Constantine's cricket practice, when he was selected for the West Indies tour he resigned his position.

=== Tour of England in 1923 ===
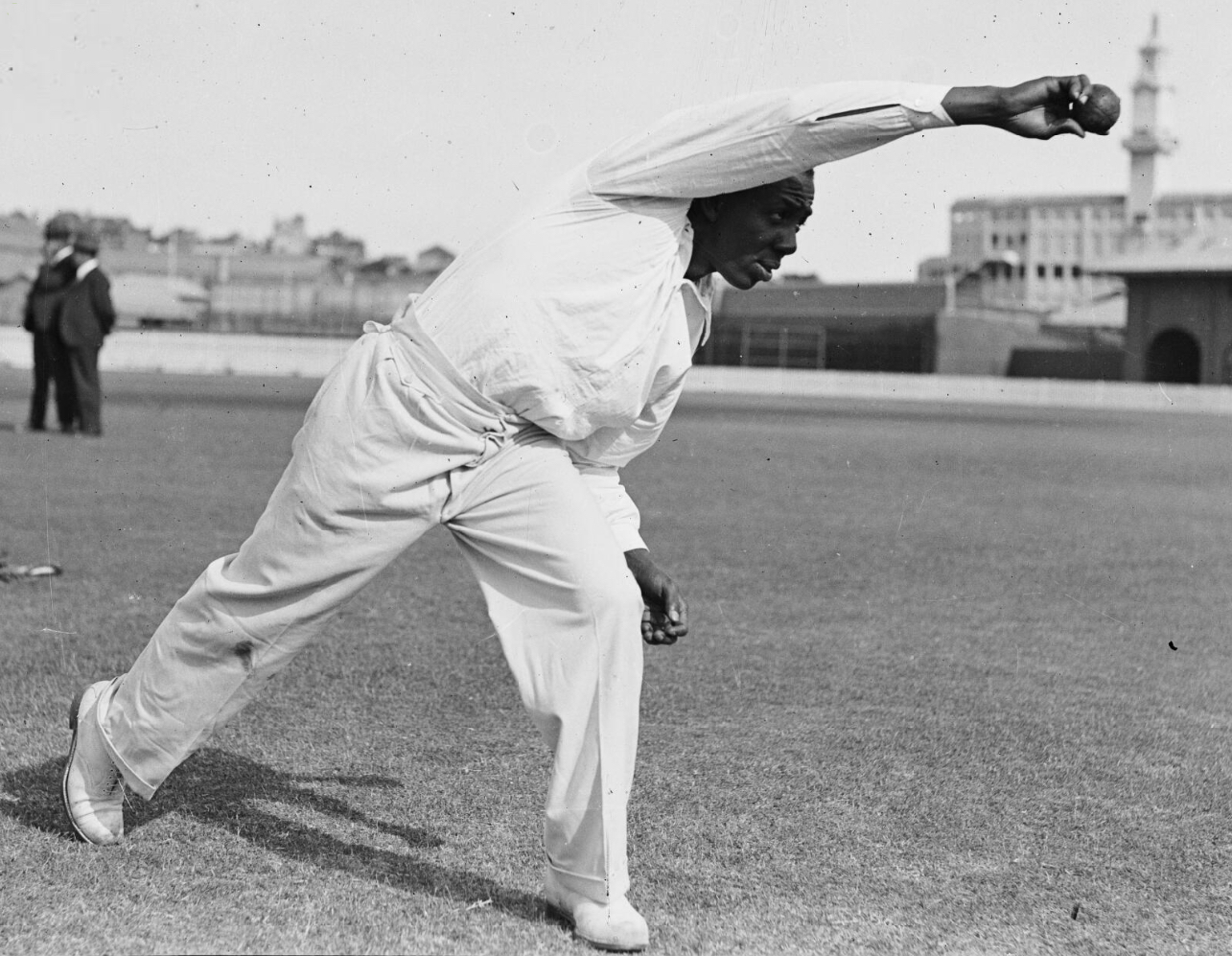
Constantine demonstrating his bowling technique

The 1923 West Indies touring team played 21 first-class matches in England, of which six were won, seven lost and the others drawn. The team's relative success, and particularly the performance of leading batsman George Challenor, persuaded English critics that West Indies cricket was stronger than previously supposed; this was instrumental in the promotion of the team to Test match status in 1928. Challenor was the biggest individual success of the tour, but Constantine impressed English critics, through his style of play more than his statistical achievements. He played 20 first-class matches on the tour, scoring 425 runs at an average of 15.74 and taking 37 wickets at an average of 21.86. Against Oxford University, he scored 77, his maiden first-class 50; his only other half-century came against Derbyshire. He also took five wickets in an innings for the first time, in the match against Kent.

Wisden Cricketers' Almanack recorded that his batting, while highly unorthodox in technique, could be very effective when he was in form. Wisden also noted that his bowling was fast. Several English players, including Jack Hobbs, singled out Constantine as an unusually talented cricketer on the strength of his performances in 1923. Pelham Warner, a former England captain and influential journalist and administrator, described Constantine after the tour as the best fielder in the world; his fielding was also praised by the press and in the pages of Wisden. James later wrote: "He is a success, but he has not set the Thames on fire, and, what is more, he hasn't tried to."

=== Mid-1920s career ===
John Arlott later commented that, on his first tour of England, Constantine "learnt much that he never forgot, by no means all of it about cricket: and he recognised the game as his only possible ladder to the kind of life he wanted." When Constantine returned to Trinidad and Tobago, he had no permanent job and little prospect of advancement in any suitable profession. He took several temporary jobs but was often forced to rely financially upon his family. However, his success had inspired him to pursue a career as a professional cricketer in England, and he began to practise to reach the required standard. Although he scored 167 for Shannon in 1924, and took eight for 38 for Trinidad and Tobago against Barbados, Constantine's cricket was steady but not consistently successful. He was initially dropped from the West Indies team to face the Marylebone Cricket Club (MCC) touring team during 1926, though he was recalled for the second match, once again at the insistence of Austin, who wanted a good cover fielder in the team. In the match Constantine was involved in an incident over short-pitched bowling. The MCC fast bowlers had bowled short at the 49-year-old Austin; in retaliation, Constantine bounced the MCC captain, Freddie Calthorpe, and only stopped after James pointed out the diplomatic row which would follow if Calthorpe, a respected figure in the British establishment, was hit by the ball. Once more, Constantine's performances were not statistically exceptional, but his style impressed critics and spectators, and he came top of the West Indies bowling averages.

A new, permanent job with Trinidad Leaseholds allowed Constantine to devote more time to cricket. Constantine realised that to succeed as a professional cricketer, he needed to improve; his bowling lacked true speed and, when batting, he was often dismissed playing shots that were too adventurous. After his relative failure in 1926, he increased his level of practice, improved his fitness and trained to become a slip fielder to conserve his energies for genuine fast bowling. In the trial matches before the 1928 tour of England, Constantine secured his place on the tour by taking five for 32 and scoring 63. He left behind his wife Norma, whom he had married in 1927, and his newly born daughter.

=== Tour of England in 1928 ===
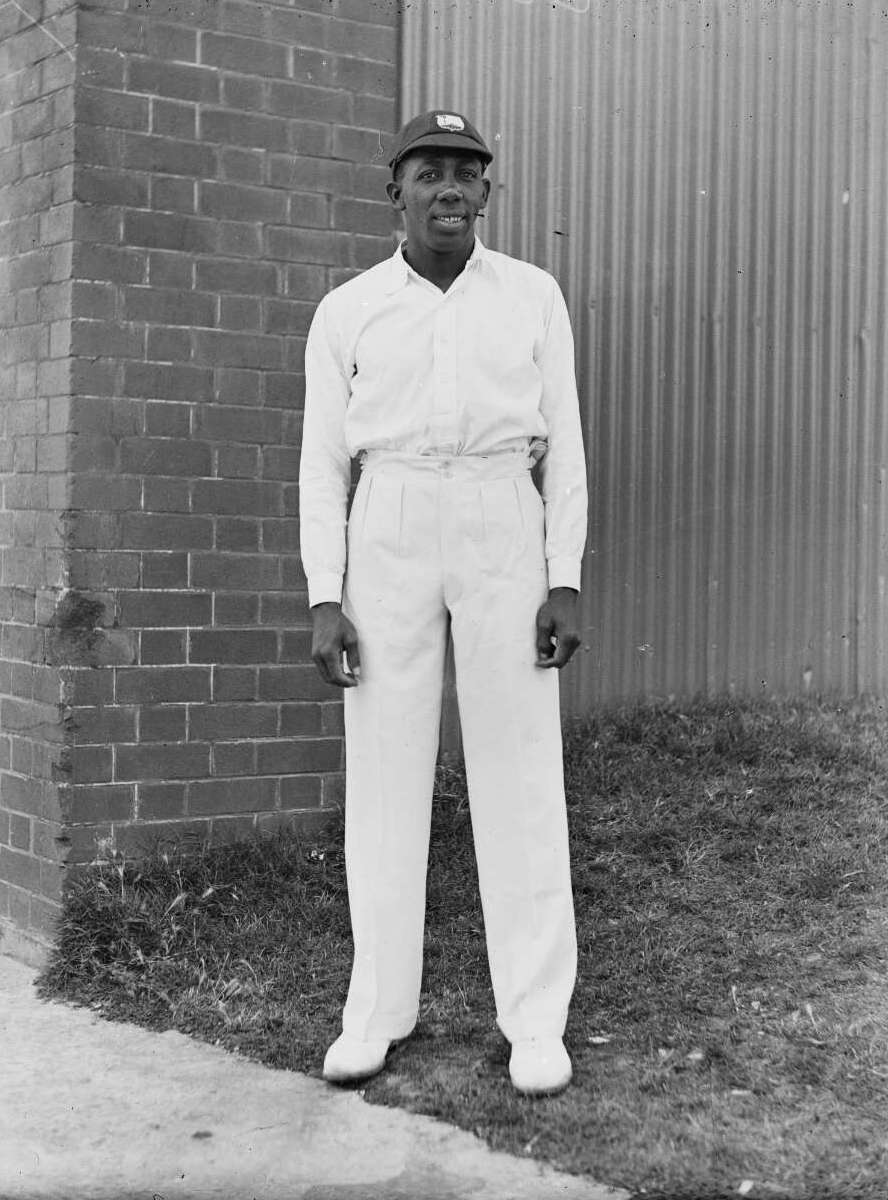
Constantine in his West Indies cap

Constantine's main objective on the 1928 tour was to secure a contract to play cricket professionally in England. James wrote that Constantine "had revolted against the revolting contrast between his first-class status as a cricketer and his third-class status as a man ... The restraints imposed upon him by social conditions in the West Indies had become intolerable and he decided to stand them no longer."

According to James, Constantine would never have left Trinidad and Tobago had he been able to live with "honour [and] a little profit". In the tour's opening first-class match, against Derbyshire, Constantine began his second innings when the West Indians needed 40 runs to win; in seven scoring shots, Constantine hit 31 runs and took the team to a two-wicket victory. In the following match he scored his maiden first-class century, 130 in 90 minutes, against Essex.

As the tour proceeded, Constantine continued his success; the Middlesex game at Lord's brought his name to the widest notice in cricket circles. Although struggling for fitness, he chose to play knowing that he was a star attraction in this high-profile game. Middlesex batted first, and reached 352 before declaring the innings closed—Constantine bowled little owing to his injury—and the West Indies were struggling at 79 for five when Constantine came in to bat. He scored 50 in 18 minutes and reached 86 in under an hour, to avert his side's follow-on. In Middlesex's second innings, Constantine took seven for 57 in a spell of extremely fast bowling and the county were dismissed for 136. The West Indies needed 259 to win; they looked likely to lose when Constantine returned to bat with the score 121 for five. He scored 103 in 60 minutes, hitting two sixes and 12 fours and guiding the West Indies to a three-wicket victory. For players and spectators this was the defining match of Constantine's career; many years later, cricket writer E. W. Swanton suggested that there were few all-round performances in the history of cricket to match it. Shortly after the game, Nelson, a cricket club in the Lancashire League, offered Constantine a professional contract.

The rest of Constantine's 1928 tour was generally successful; only in the three Test matches, the first played by the West Indies, was he less effective. Although he took the West Indies' first wicket in Test cricket, dismissing Charlie Hallows, and finished with innings figures of four for 82, he took only one more wicket during the remainder of the series and ended with five wickets at an average of 52.40; with the bat, he scored 89 runs in six innings at 14.83. Even so, Jack Hobbs said that Constantine's opening overs to him in the first Test were among the fastest he ever faced, Constantine believed his captain, Karl Nunes, over-bowled him; the pair did not get along well. When the tour ended, Constantine had scored more runs and taken more wickets and catches in first-class games than any other tourist. He was second in the team's batting averages with 1,381 runs at 34.52, and led the bowling averages with 107 wickets at 22.95. It was the manner in which Constantine played which set him apart from the restrained form of cricket generally played in England at the time: his style, aggression and entertainment value made a big impression on the crowds. According to Peter Mason in his biography of Constantine, he established a unique style of West Indian cricket and possibly established the template for West Indian cricketers for years to come.

=== Series against England and Australia ===
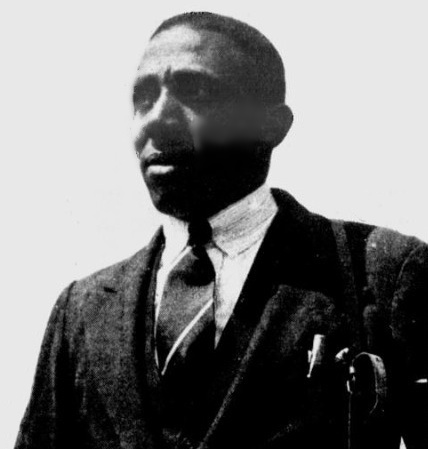
Constantine during the tour of Australia in 1930

At the end of the 1928 tour Constantine returned home and helped Trinidad and Tobago to win the Intercolonial Tournament. He took 16 wickets in the two games and scored 133 in the final against Barbados, the highest score of his career and a record for Trinidad and Tobago at the time. These were his last matches in the tournament, as the rules did not permit professional cricketers (which he became when he signed for Nelson) to take part. In 1929 Constantine played one match in Jamaica for a West Indies team against an English touring team and then travelled to Nelson to begin his professional career.

Constantine returned to the West Indies to face England (represented by the MCC as was usual in those days) in a four-match Test series early in 1930. The first Test was drawn; Constantine scored few runs, but bowled for a long time and fielded well. After the game, he was awarded a bat for his contribution. Calthorpe, the MCC captain, criticised his use of short-pitched bowling to a leg side field; one such ball struck Andy Sandham, but Constantine only reverted to more conventional tactics after a request from the MCC manager. During the second Test Constantine scored a rapid 58 and took six wickets, but the West Indies lost by 167 runs. In the following match the West Indies recorded their first win in Test matches; after centuries from George Headley and Clifford Roach, Constantine took four for 35 and five for 87 to secure the victory. Constantine was omitted from the final match in Jamaica, because inter-island politics meant that selectors tended to pick players from the island hosting the Test. In the series, 29 players represented the West Indies and the team had a different captain in each match. In the three matches in which he played, Constantine scored 144 runs at 14.40 and took 18 wickets at 27.61.

After his second season at Nelson, Constantine joined the first West Indies team to tour Australia in the 1930–31 season. The side felt some trepidation over how the black members of the side would be received, but the tour passed off without incident; Constantine later praised the reception the team was accorded. The West Indians were captained by Jackie Grant, a white man who had played for Cambridge University but was unfamiliar with his team. Constantine considered this unsatisfactory, and felt it affected the team's performances. The West Indies were heavily defeated in the five-Test series, losing the first four matches before winning the last. Constantine achieved little in the series, scoring 72 runs at 7.20 and taking eight wickets at 50.87.

In other first-class games, he was more successful and, although Headley performed very well, it was Constantine who proved most popular with spectators. Even before the Tests began, his fielding drew praise from the press and he was described in The Sydney Mail as the fastest bowler seen in Australia for years.

Monty Noble, a former Australian captain, writing in the Sydney Sun described one innings of 59 runs as "sensational" and one of the best played in Australia since the war. Constantine scored a century in 52 minutes against Tasmania, played five other innings over 50 and took three five-wicket returns. In 1950, Donald Bradman, who played against Constantine that season, described him as the greatest fielder he had seen. In all first-class matches, Constantine scored 708 runs at an average of 30.78 and took 47 wickets at 20.21; he led the team's bowling averages and came fourth in batting.

=== Test series against England in 1933 and 1934–35 ===
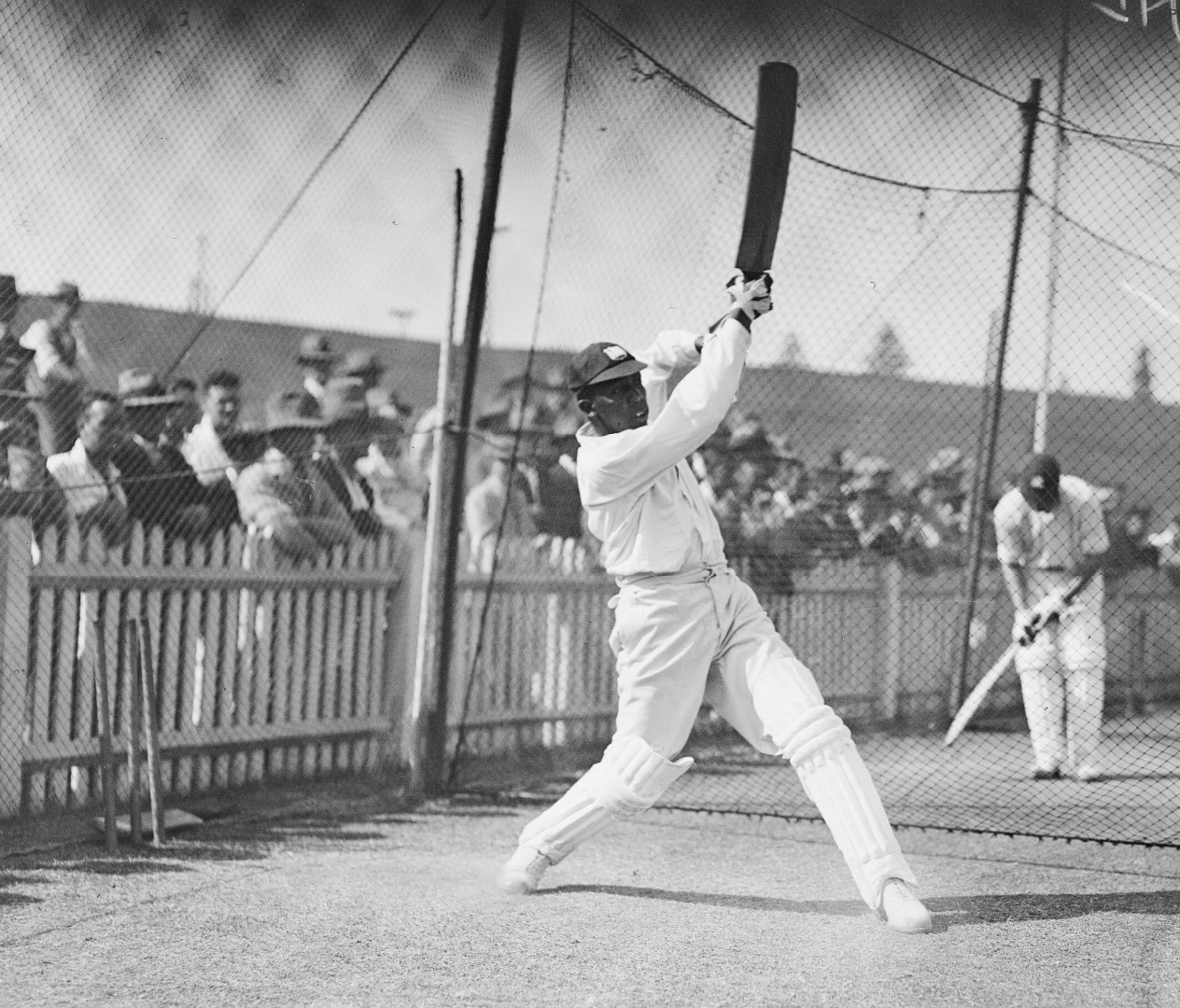
Constantine practising his batting in the nets

By now living in Nelson and barred from the Inter-Colonial Tournament, Constantine played no first-class cricket for two years. His contract with Nelson made him unavailable for much of the 1933 West Indies' tour of England under Grant. Constantine never challenged Nelson over this; some critics suggested he was swayed by the greater financial rewards the club provided. He appeared once for the tourists in May, scoring 57 in 27 minutes and taking four wickets in a victory over an MCC team at Lord's. The West Indian board unsuccessfully tried to secure his release for the first Test match, which the West Indies lost heavily. After he took nine wickets in the tourists' game against Yorkshire, Nelson gave him permission to appear in the second Test at Manchester.

During the previous winter, England had played Australia in the controversial Bodyline series in which the English bowlers were accused of bowling the ball on the line of leg stump. The deliveries were often short-pitched with four or five fielders close by on the leg side waiting to catch deflections off the bat. The tactics were difficult for batsmen to counter and were designed to be intimidatory. In the 1933 English season, Bodyline was a sensitive subject. There had already been controversy in the tourists' match against the MCC, during which Constantine and Manny Martindale, another West Indian fast bowler, were criticised in the press for bowling short. Frustrated by a slow pitch which he believed was intended to neutralise his fast bowlers, Grant had ordered Constantine to bowl Bodyline against Yorkshire, and decided to repeat the tactics in the second Test. The West Indies scored 375, of which Constantine made 31. When England replied, several batsmen were discomfited by the Bodyline bowling; Wally Hammond was struck on the chin and retired hurt. Constantine and Martindale bowled up to four short deliveries each over so that the ball rose to head height; occasionally they bowled around the wicket.

Although not as fast as he had been on the previous tour, Constantine was still capable of short bursts of very fast bowling. However, the slowness of the pitch reduced the effectiveness of the Bodyline tactics, and Constantine took one for 55; England's captain Douglas Jardine, who had implemented the Bodyline tactics in Australia, batted for five hours to score his only Test century. The public disapproval expressed during and after the match was instrumental in turning English attitudes against Bodyline, something Constantine considered hypocritical. In the West Indies' second innings Constantine's innings of 64 in an hour ensured that the match was drawn. Nelson initially agreed to release him for the third Test, with Essex all-rounder Stan Nichols to be Constantine's substitute for the club team. When Jardine heard, he convinced the England selectors to include Nichols in the England team for the Test, the deal collapsed and Constantine did not play. Most critics believed that the West Indies underachieved in the Test series; Constantine believed that one cause was the inadequacy of Grant as captain. In all first-class games on the tour Constantine scored 181 runs at 20.11 and took 14 wickets at 22.14.

Constantine worked in India as a cricket coach during 1934, playing two matches in the Moin-ud-Dowlah Gold Cup Tournament. He was invited to play in the 1935 Test series against England in the West Indies, and although he arrived too late for the first Test, won by England, he played in the remaining three games of the series. In a match for Trinidad and Tobago before the second Test, he and his brother Elias appeared together for the only time in a first-class match, and shared a partnership of 93. In the next Test Constantine scored 90, his highest Test score. England needed 325 to win in the fourth innings, but lost early wickets. In the final stages of the match Constantine was warned by the umpire for bowling Bodyline, and Grant withdrew him from the bowling attack. After the crowd protested, Constantine returned to bowl; with two balls of the match left, he took the final English wicket. The West Indies won by 217 runs, with Constantine taking three for 11; in the match as a whole he scored 121 runs and took five wickets. The third Test was drawn, leaving the final Test to decide the series. After making a large total, the West Indies bowled England out twice to win by an innings and record their first Test series victory. As well as taking six wickets in the game, Constantine captained the team to victory after Grant injured an ankle on the last morning and asked Constantine to assume the leadership. Peter Mason writes: "Given the measures that the West Indian authorities had taken to ensure that no black man would ever captain a regional side, it was a great irony and a huge source of delight to Constantine that he should be the man to lead the team at the moment of their greatest achievement so far." Once more, the press praised Constantine and hailed his achievements. In the series, he scored 169 runs at an average of 33.80 and took 15 wickets at 13.13.

=== Tour of England in 1939 ===
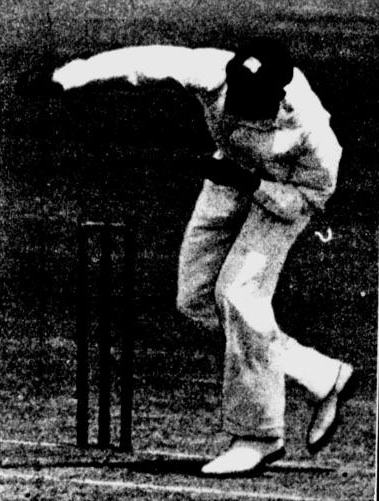
Constantine bowling in 1930

Apart from one guest appearance for Barbados in a friendly match early in 1939, Constantine did not play first-class cricket after 1935 until the West Indies toured England in 1939. Constantine had deliberately not signed a league contract in 1939, to be available for the tour. However, he was unhappy with the playing strength of the touring team and the £600 he was offered in wages. He believed the captain, Rolph Grant, was unqualified for the job and had been appointed only because he was white. Constantine captained the side in one match, but was reprimanded by the West Indies board for not pursuing a win. The West Indies lost the three-match Test series 1–0 against a very strong England side, although critics judged the overall playing record of the team to be good. In the three Tests, Constantine scored 110 runs at 27.50 and took 11 wickets at 29.81, including five for 75 in the final Test.

By this time Constantine bowled generally at medium pace from a short run-up. To compensate for his reduced pace he mixed up his bowling style, spinning the ball and bowling at speeds varying from slow to very fast. He bowled more overs than any other member of the team, and was the side's leading wicket-taker with 103 wickets in the season. His bowling average of 17.77 placed him first in the team's bowling averages and seventh in the English national averages. With the bat, Constantine scored 614 runs at 21.17; Preston wrote that Constantine "often electrified onlookers with his almost impudent zest for runs". His highest innings came in the final Test match when he scored 79 in an hour and hit 11 fours. Wisden commented: "Constantine, in the mood suggesting his work in Saturday afternoon League cricket, brought a welcome air of gaiety to the Test arena. He revolutionised all the recognised features of cricket and, surpass[ed] Bradman in his amazing stroke play." For his all-round performances during the season he was chosen as one of Wisden's Cricketers of the Year.

The third Test match, after which the tour was abandoned owing to the imminent outbreak of the Second World War, was Constantine's last. In 18 Test matches between 1928 and 1939 he scored 635 runs at an average of 19.24, took 58 wickets at 30.10 and held 28 catches. He played one more first-class match when, in 1945, he captained a team representing the "Dominions" against England at Lord's. The match was narrowly won by the Dominions. Constantine, in the second innings, shared a partnership of 117 in 45 minutes with Keith Miller. He bowled very little, but ran out a batsman at a key point in the final innings. In all first-class cricket, Constantine scored 4,475 runs at 24.05 and took 439 wickets at 20.48.

=== Lancashire League cricketer ===
In 1928, Constantine had signed an initial three-year contract with Nelson, to play in the Lancashire League. The contract was worth £500 per season, plus performance bonuses and travelling expenses. He remained there until 1937, an unusually long time for a professional to remain with one club. Constantine's appearances boosted attendances and gate receipts for all Nelson's matches, and was of great financial benefit to both the club and the League as a whole. In Constantine's nine seasons at the club, Nelson never finished lower than second, won the league competition seven times and the knockout cup twice. In 1931, Constantine renewed his contract for £650 per season; when, in 1935, a rival league attempted to sign him, all the Lancashire League clubs contributed to his wage, which rose to £750 per year between 1935 and 1937. This was far more than the then maximum wage for a professional footballer of £386, or the £500 per season that a top county cricketer could potentially earn, and possibly made Constantine the best-paid sportsman in the country. Consequently, he and his family enjoyed a good standard of living for the first time in their lives.

As Nelson's professional, Constantine was immediately successful. Although he produced better figures in subsequent years, he considered his first season at Nelson the most enjoyable of his life, owing to the freedom and excitement of the cricket. During nine years at the club he scored 6,363 runs at an average of 37.65 and took 776 wickets at 9.50. His highest score was 192, and his best bowling figures were ten wickets for ten runs. In each season except for 1932, he averaged over 30 with the bat and in 1933 he scored 1,000 runs at an average of over 50. He took over 70 wickets every season and his bowling average never rose above 11.30; in five seasons, he averaged under ten runs per wicket. In 1933, he took 96 wickets, his highest seasonal aggregate, and had he not missed two games to play for the West Indies touring team, would likely have completed the cricketer's double (1,000 runs and 100 wickets), an unprecedented feat in the league.

In the mid-1930s, representatives from Lancashire County Cricket Club twice approached Constantine with a view to him joining the club — his time in Nelson meant that he qualified to play for Lancashire, having lived in the county for the required time. There was a precedent for such a course, as the Australian Ted McDonald had joined Lancashire after playing as Nelson's professional in the 1920s. In the case of Constantine, nothing happened, as members of the Lancashire Board and, later, players in the team opposed the idea of a black man playing for the county. In any case, Constantine preferred league cricket to what he perceived was the negativity and dullness of county cricket. He found the standard of play very high, stating: "Never in my life have I played harder than in Lancashire." In his history of West Indies cricket, Michael Manley writes that league cricket at this time was intense and unrelenting, but: "it was in this special atmosphere of League cricket that Constantine was supreme."

For the 1938 season, Constantine played for Rochdale in the Central Lancashire Cricket League, although he continued to live in Nelson. He received £812 for the season, and performed successfully, but did not enjoy the experience. The nature of the pitches was different in his new league; furthermore, some of the players seemed resentful of his high earnings. There was also an incident of racial abuse which Constantine believed the Central Lancashire League committee effectively covered up. This season ended Constantine's career in the Lancashire Leagues, although during the war he returned to play for Nelson as an amateur.

=== Style and technique ===
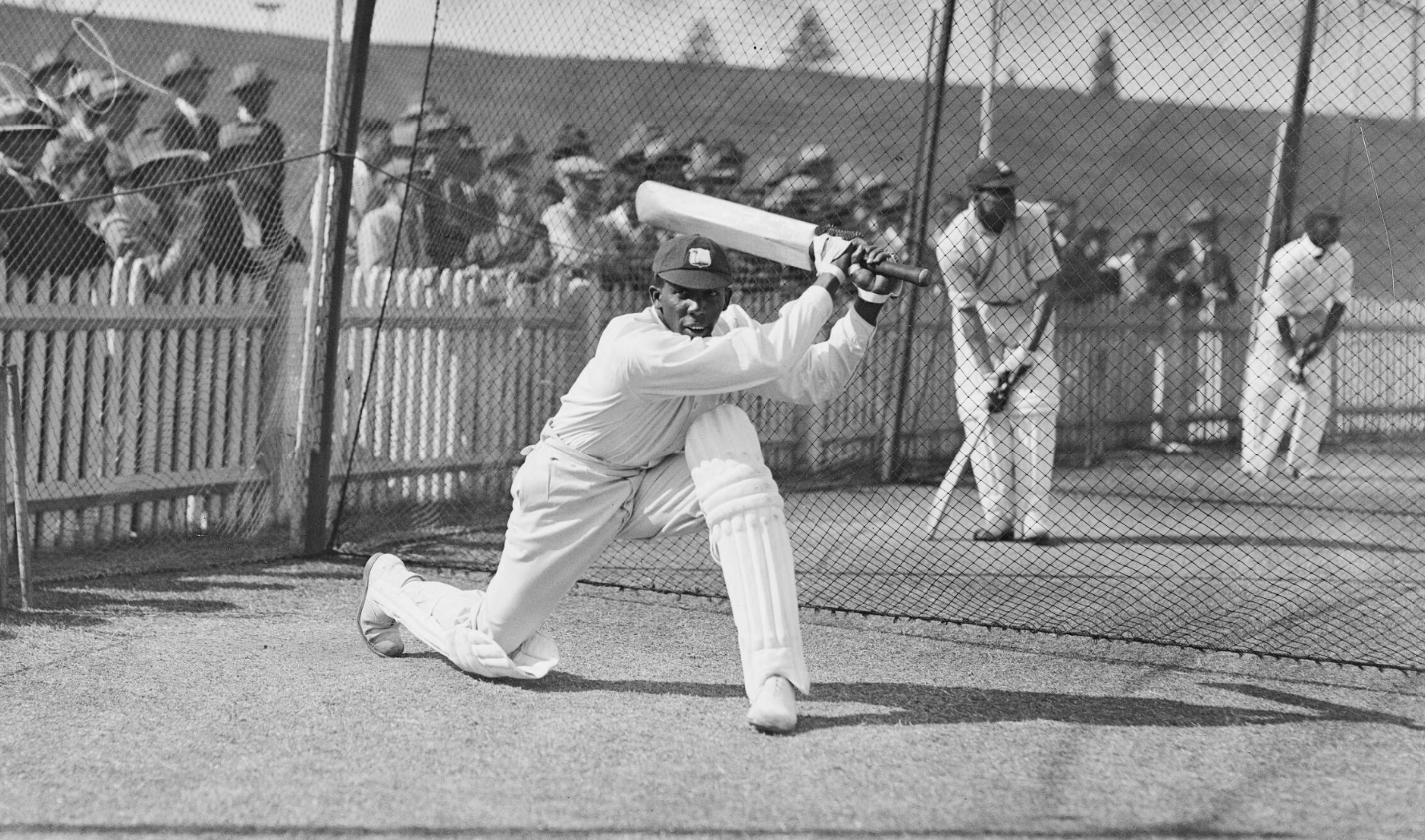
Constantine practising his batting in the nets in Australia in 1930

Swanton believed that Constantine was the first West Indian cricketer to make an impression on the British public: "he ... personified West Indian cricket from the first faltering entry in the Test arena in 1928 until the post-war emergence of the trinity of Worrell, Weekes and Walcott." Swanton continued: "There have been many all-rounders with better records ... but it is hard to think of one who made a more sensational impact [and] impossible to imagine his superior as a fielder anywhere."

In 1934, Neville Cardus described Constantine as a "genius" and the "most original cricketer of recent years". R. C. Robertson-Glasgow called Constantine the most exciting cricketer to watch of all his contemporaries. This was partly because his style of cricket meant that he could alter the course of a match in a short space of time, although he developed his technique to minimise risk.

Constantine's batting was based on good eyesight, quick reflexes and natural ability. He used his wrists to adjust the angle of the bat at the last second, allowing him to counter unexpected late movement of the ball. He batted by instinct and, according to Manley, "his every stroke [owed] more to energy than calculation". He was capable of scoring rapidly against any standard of bowling, but rarely survived for long periods because he chose not to defend. His best shots were the cut, pull and hook. Critics believed that Constantine's batting reached its peak once he became an accomplished league cricketer. By setting himself to master the variety of pitch conditions he encountered, and adopting a style of fast-scoring and occasionally unorthodox batting, he became an adaptable and effective batsman in all forms of cricket, improvising where necessary to prevent bowlers getting on top.

As a cover-point fielder Constantine was, according to Manley, "athletic, panther-quick, sure handed and with an arm that could rifle the ball into the wicket-keeper's gloves like a bullet even from the deepest boundary". Many critics considered him to be one of the best fielders of all time. As a bowler, Constantine accelerated from a relatively short run into what Manley calls an "explosive" delivery. James believes he reached his best form as a bowler in 1939, using what he had learned in the leagues. By this time his varieties of spin, pace and flight made him effective even when conditions favoured the batsmen. Although Constantine's Test bowling record was modest, this may to some extent reflect the poor standard of fielding in the early West Indies teams, in particular their propensity to drop catches.

Manley writes that wherever Constantine played he brought "style and humour: that aggressiveness that is somehow good-natured and which is the distinctively West Indian quality in all sport. Constantine's extrovert exuberance was, of course, more particularly Trinidadian than generally West Indian. Perhaps it is this last characteristic that gave him that special quality of panache which sets him apart from all other West Indian cricketers."

== Life in England ==
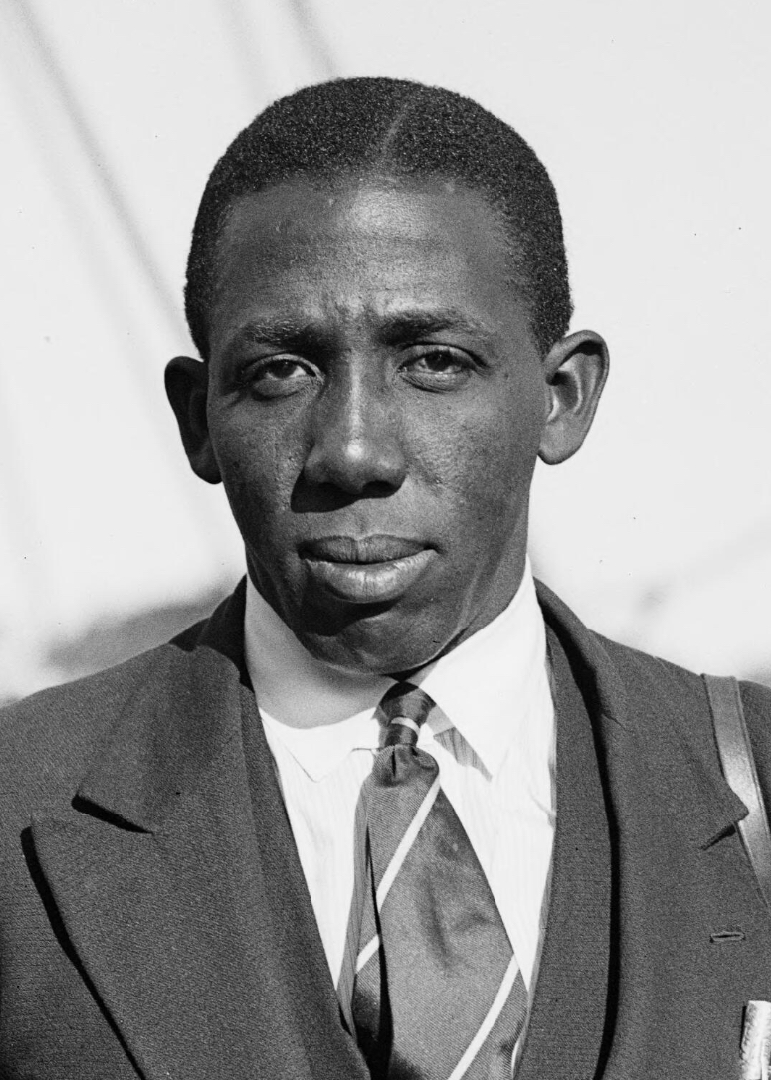
Constantine in November 1930

=== Nelson ===
During his time in Nelson, Constantine made a deep impression and remained a celebrity there even after leaving the town; his general community involvement was such that a regional historian described him as a "local champion". He appreciated the greater freedom he enjoyed in Nelson as compared with Trinidad and Tobago, where racial issues predominated. Although Nelson suffered from the effects of the Depression, Constantine's high earnings were never a source of resentment; of his time in Nelson, he wrote: "If I had not come ... I could not have been the person I am today ... I am a better citizen for the time I have spent in Nelson."

Constantine's first season was difficult; both he and the residents of the town were at that stage uncertain of each other. Few black people had been seen in Nelson, and although some residents wrote welcoming letters, the Constantines also received racist and abusive ones. He quickly established boundaries over what he considered acceptable, permitting and even sharing small jokes over skin colour but protesting strongly at outright racism. John Arlott wrote: "[Constantine] fought discrimination against his people with a dignity firm but free of acrimony." Although Constantine later attributed some of the initial uneasiness to ignorance, at the time he seriously considered returning to Trinidad and Tobago after the first season. His wife persuaded him otherwise, pointing out the benefits from remaining to complete his contract. From 1930, Constantine found life more comfortable; the family began to develop friendships and to engage in the social life of the town. They continued to visit Trinidad and Tobago in the English winters, but Nelson became the family's permanent home.

In 1931, the Constantines settled in a fairly prosperous, middle-class area of Nelson, where they were to live until 1949. During 1932, they took C. L. R. James—who knew Constantine through having played cricket against him in Trinidad and Tobago—as a lodger; James had come to London but had run out of money. James was at the forefront of a growing West Indian nationalist movement, though Constantine had until then consciously avoided politics. Through James' influence, Constantine realised that his position gave him opportunities to further the cause of racial equality and independence for Trinidad and Tobago. He joined the League of Coloured Peoples, an organisation aiming to achieve racial equality for black people in Britain. He helped James to get a job with the Manchester Guardian, and in return, James helped Constantine to write his first book, Cricket and I, which was published in London in 1933, with a preface by Neville Cardus. Later commentators have identified Constantine's book as an important step in West Indian nationalism, and an encouragement to future authors. At that time, James stated, few active cricketers wrote books and "no one in the West Indies that I knew, cricketer or not, was writing books at all; certainly none was being printed abroad." Constantine and James drifted apart once the latter returned to London; they remained in contact but did not always agree politically or morally. Mason believes, however, that without Constantine's assistance James might not have later established himself as a celebrated political writer.

=== Career during the war ===
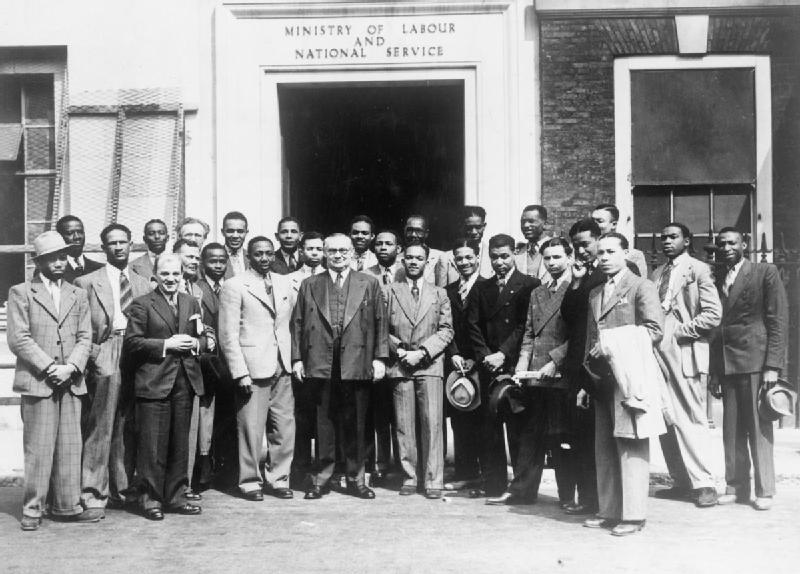
Constantine (in white suit, to the left of centre) introduces West Indian workers to the Minister of Labour, Ernest Bevin, during the Second World War.

During the war, Constantine continued his cricket career as a league professional; (Note: Constantine played for Windhill Cricket Club in the Bradford League until 1941, and later played as an amateur in the Liverpool and District League.) also, as a popular player who could boost crowd attendances, he appeared in many wartime charity games. However, the war ended his career in top-class cricket and signalled a change in his life's priorities. Remaining in Nelson when the war started, he initially served as an Air Raid Precautions equipment officer, and as a billeting officer for incoming evacuees. After applying for a job with the Ministry of Labour, Constantine was offered a senior position as Welfare Officer by the Ministry of Labour and National Service.

Using his familiarity with life in England, and his high profile and status as a cricketer, Constantine became responsible for the many West Indians who had been recruited to work in factories in the north-west of England for the duration of the war. Working mainly from Liverpool, he helped these men to adapt to their unfamiliar environment and to deal with the severe racism and discrimination which many of them faced. Constantine also worked closely with trade unions in an attempt to ease the fears and suspicions of white workers. He used his influence with the Ministry of Labour to pressurise companies who refused to employ West Indians, but generally preferred negotiation to confrontation, an approach that was often successful. Constantine's wartime experiences caused him to increase his involvement in the League of Coloured Peoples, sometimes referring cases to them. He particularly took up the cause of the children of white women and black overseas servicemen; these children were often abandoned by their parents. However, plans to create a children's home for them came to nothing, leaving Constantine frustrated. He remained in his post until the summer of 1946, latterly concerned with the repatriation of the West Indian workers at the end of the war. For his wartime work he was appointed a Member of the Order of the British Empire (MBE) in 1947.

During the war, at the request of the British government, Constantine made radio broadcasts to the West Indies, reporting on the involvement of West Indians in the war effort. As a result, he was often asked to speak on BBC radio about his life in England. His radio performances met with critical acclaim, and he became a frequent guest on radio panel shows; he also took part in a film documentary, West Indies calling, in 1943.

=== Constantine v Imperial London Hotels ===
In August 1943 Constantine played in a charity cricket match at Lord's and had booked rooms for himself, his wife and daughter at the Imperial Hotel, London for four nights. He had been specifically told that his colour would not be an issue at the hotel. When he arrived on 30 July, he was told that they could only stay for one night because their presence might offend other guests. When Arnold Watson, a colleague of Constantine at the Ministry of Labour, arrived and attempted to intervene, he was told by the manager: "We are not going to have these niggers in our hotel," and that his presence might offend American guests. Watson argued, to no avail, that not only was Constantine a British subject, he worked for the government. Eventually Watson persuaded Constantine to leave and stay at another hotel which, owned by the same company as the Imperial, proved to be welcoming. The Imperial Hotel incident affected Constantine deeply, both because of the involvement of his family and also because he was due to play cricket for a team representing the British Empire and Commonwealth.

In September questions were asked in the House of Commons about the incident, by which time Constantine had decided to take legal action. In June 1944 Constantine v Imperial London Hotels was heard in the High Court. Although there was no law against racial discrimination in Britain at the time, Constantine argued that the hotel had breached its contract with him. Constantine informed the court that the attitude of the hotel changed between his booking and arrival, owing to the presence of white American servicemen. The defence argued that they had met their contract by accommodating Constantine in another hotel and that he had left the Imperial voluntarily. The managing director of the hotel denied that racist language had been used. After two days of evidence, the judge found in Constantine's favour, rejecting the defence's arguments and praising the way Constantine had handled the situation. Although the law limited the award of damages against the hotel to five guineas, Constantine was vindicated. He did not pursue the case any further as he believed he had sufficiently raised the issue of racism in the public eye; the case was widely reported in the press, and Constantine received great support from both the public and the government.

Although racial discrimination continued to persist in Britain, this case was the first to challenge such practices in court. Critics regard it as a milestone in British racial equality in demonstrating that black people had legal recourse against some forms of racism. According to Mason, it "was one of the key milestones along the road to the creation of the Race Relations Act of 1965."

=== Legal studies ===
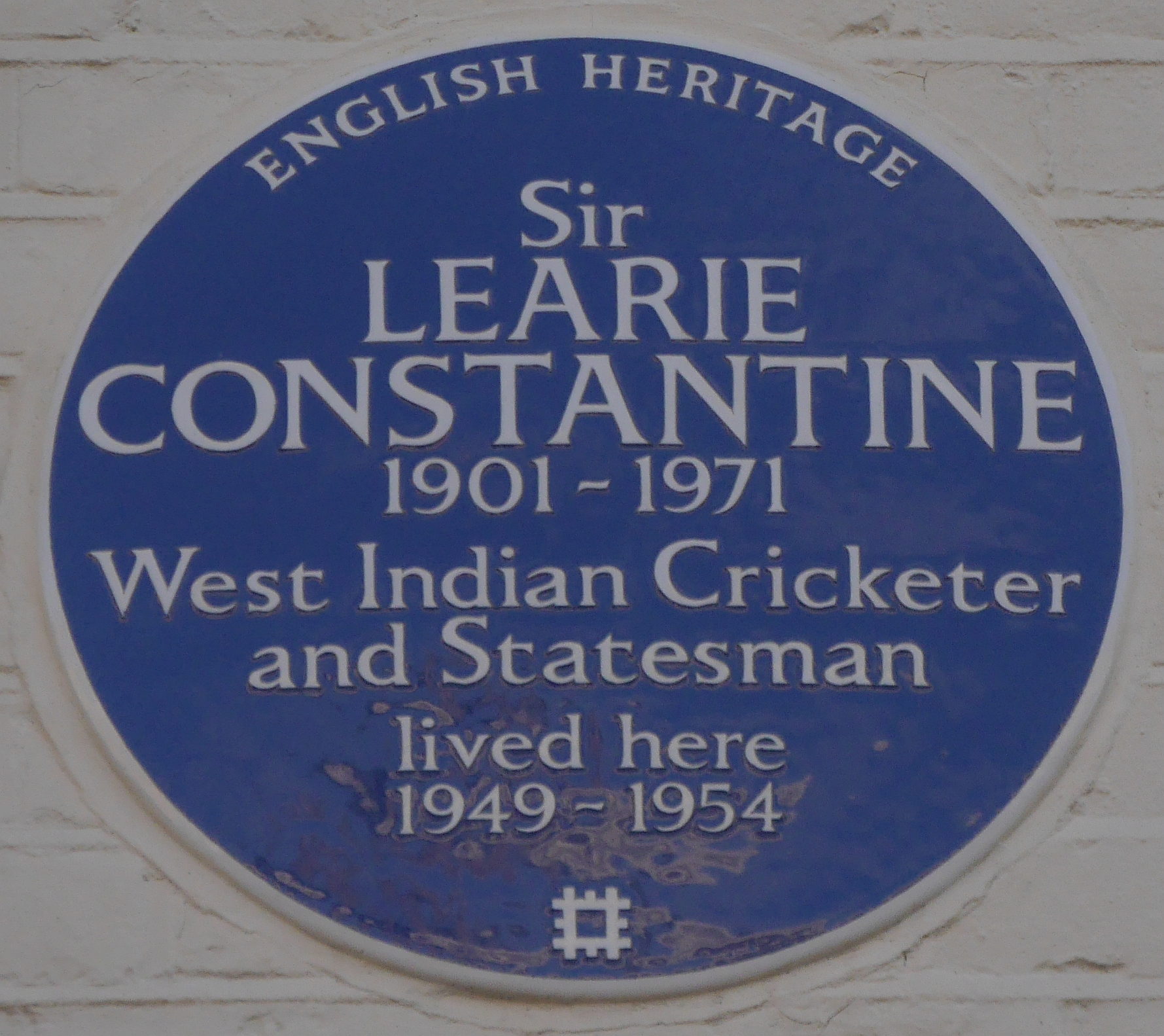
Blue plaque, 101 Lexham Gardens, Kensington, London, Constantine's home from 1949 to 1954

While living and playing cricket in Nelson before the war, Constantine had made plans for a future legal career. James helped him with his studies for a short time, and he later worked in a local solicitors' office. In 1944 he enrolled as a student in the Middle Temple, London. To finance his studies, he continued his professional cricket career in Bradford until 1948, and supplemented his income by coaching: at Trinity College, Dublin, in 1947 and in Ceylon in 1953. Constantine also extended his work in journalism and broadcasting, as a cricket reporter and as a radio commentator when the West Indies toured England in 1950. He also wrote several cricket books, probably with the help of a ghostwriter. Cricket in the Sun (1947) covered his career but also discussed the racism he had encountered and suggested then-radical ideas for the future of cricket, such as a one-day "world cup". Cricketers' Carnival (1948), Cricket Crackers, Cricketers' Cricket (both 1949) and How To Play Cricket (1951) were more traditional cricket books, which included coaching tips and opinions.

In 1947 Constantine became chairman of the League of Coloured Peoples, a position he held until the League was discontinued in 1951. In 1948 he was elected president of the Caribbean Congress of Labour, and between 1947 and 1950 was a member of the Colonial Office's Colonial Social Welfare Advisory Committee. Also in 1950, he became involved in a controversy over the interracial marriage of Seretse Khama, the future president of Botswana. Constantine lobbied the government on Khama's behalf, organised meetings and even approached the United Nations. Little was achieved, and Constantine disapproved of the approach of the Labour government and its Prime Minister, Clement Attlee, but declined an opportunity to become a Liberal parliamentary candidate.

Constantine neither enjoyed his legal studies, nor found the work easy, but was determined to prove he could succeed. His wife kept him motivated, restricted visitors to avoid distractions and forced him to study, making him continue when he was several times tempted to give up. The family moved to London in 1949; between 1950 and 1954, Constantine passed the required series of examinations, and in 1954 he was called to the bar by the Middle Temple.

Having turned down an offer in 1947 to return to his old employer, Trinidad Leaseholds, in 1954 Constantine agreed to join the same company as an assistant legal advisor. Uncertain about going back to Trinidad and Tobago after living for 25 years in England, he nevertheless believed it was a good time to return, particularly as his daughter was moving there to marry. Before leaving England, he published his book Colour Bar (1954), which addressed race relations in Britain and the racism he had experienced. It also discussed worldwide racial oppression and how the lives of black people could be improved. At the time, according to Peter Mason, this was "an explosive, challenging, hard hitting tome, the more so because it came not from a known black militant but from someone who seemed so charming, so unruffled, so suited to British society". Although not viewed as radical by black audiences, it was aimed at white British readers. The British press gave it mixed reviews and criticised him for unfairness in parts of the book; other critics accused him of communist sympathies.

== Return to Trinidad and Tobago ==
When Constantine returned to Trinidad and Tobago in late 1954, he found a growing desire for independence from Britain. At Trinidad Leaseholds he felt isolated from other, mainly white, senior staff; this drew him towards political involvement. Eric Williams, leader of the newly founded People's National Movement (PNM), was aware of Constantine's popular appeal and recruited him. By January 1956 Constantine, with the full co-operation and blessing of his employers, was party chairman and a member of its executive committee. Feeling that the PNM's policies were in harmony with his views on improving the lives of black people, and encouraged by his wife, Constantine stood for election in the parliamentary constituency of Tunapuna in 1956. He won a narrow victory, which his colleagues believed few in the party could have done, and resigned from Trinidad Leaseholds. The PNM formed a government, in which Constantine became the Minister of Communications, Works and Utilities.

In his ministerial role, Constantine promoted development of Trinidad and Tobago's road, rail, water and electricity infrastructure. However, in late 1958 he was accused of corruption, over a ship leasing deal. His angry response to the charge, in the Legislative Council, created a perception of arrogance among his colleagues, and suggested that he had not sufficiently adapted to parliamentary politics. According to Mason, the speech was a miscalculation which made the public, perhaps already sceptical of his commitment to Trinidad and Tobago after so many years away, question his fitness for a ministerial role, a view increasingly held by commentators.

In the later 1950s, Constantine supported the campaign, led by James, to appoint West Indies cricket's first black captain; the success of black people like Constantine in attaining government positions while not permitted to captain the cricket team was a key factor in an ultimately successful campaign. While in government, Constantine assisted in the development of the West Indies Federation, as a step towards the independence of the islands, and his fame and familiarity with Britain played some part in the negotiations which led to Trinidad and Tobago's independence in 1962. After he decided not to stand for re-election in 1961, Williams appointed him as Trinidad and Tobago's first High Commissioner in London.

Peter Mason writes that Constantine's political career in Trinidad and Tobago was a success: he was efficient, active, respected and popular. Mason concedes that he was not a natural politician, often sensitive to criticism and that his experience abroad was a cause for mistrust in Trinidad and Tobago, rather than seen as an advantage. Gerald Howat believes that Constantine's political career, while not without successes, was undermined by several factors: his age, his over-frequent references to his English experience, his rejection of political theorising and lack of debating skills. However, his personal popularity undoubtedly attracted support to the PNM.

== Back to the United Kingdom ==
=== High Commissioner ===
Constantine began his role as High Commissioner in June 1961. In the 1962 New Year Honours List, he was knighted and became Sir Learie Constantine; among other accolades he received at this time was the freedom of the town of Nelson. Mason notes that Constantine had now "passed firmly into the consciousness as a British treasure". However, his tenure as High Commissioner ended in controversy. Constantine felt that his high-profile required him to speak out on racial issues affecting all West Indian immigrants, not just Trinidadians.

In April 1963, when a Bristol bus company was refusing to employ black staff, Constantine visited the city and spoke to the press about the issue. His intervention assisted in a speedy resolution of the affair which, according to Mason, was crucial in persuading the British government of the need for a Race Relations Act. However, politicians in both Trinidad and Tobago and Britain felt a senior diplomat should not be so closely involved in British domestic affairs, particularly as he acted without consulting his government. Williams effectively withdrew his support from Constantine, who decided not to continue as High Commissioner when his term expired in February 1964. He was succeeded by Wilfred Andrew Rose.

Although as High Commissioner Constantine looked after his staff and was respected by other diplomats, Howat observes there is limited evidence that he was successful in the post: "In the one area in which he acted positively, he blundered—the Bristol affair. In the language of the game he loved ... his timing was wrong though he was full of good intentions". Howat adds that he did not increase his stature or reputation during his term of office. Mason believes that "there was too much of the welfare officer about him and not enough of the government focused diplomat."

=== Final years ===
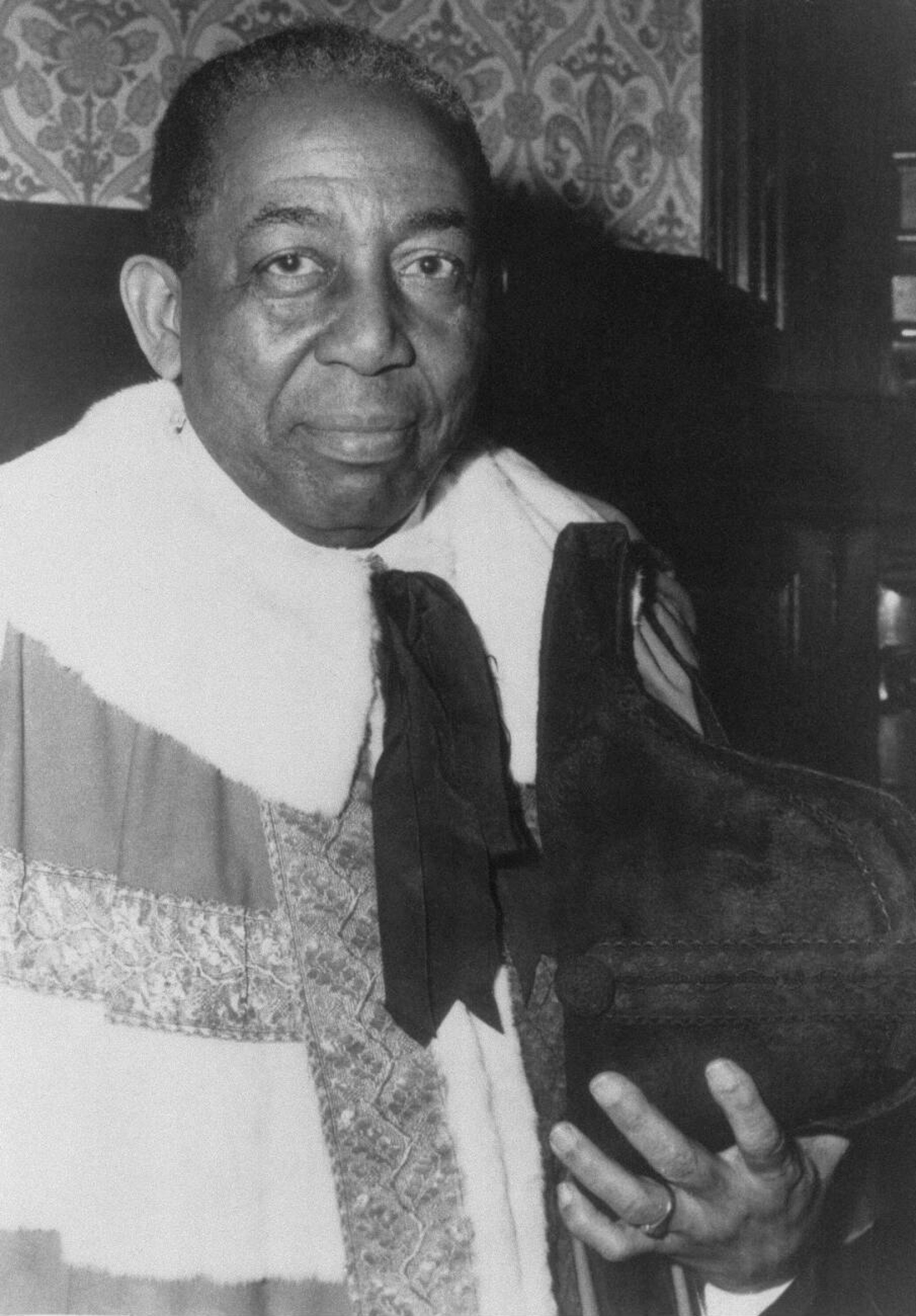
Learie Constantine (1969)

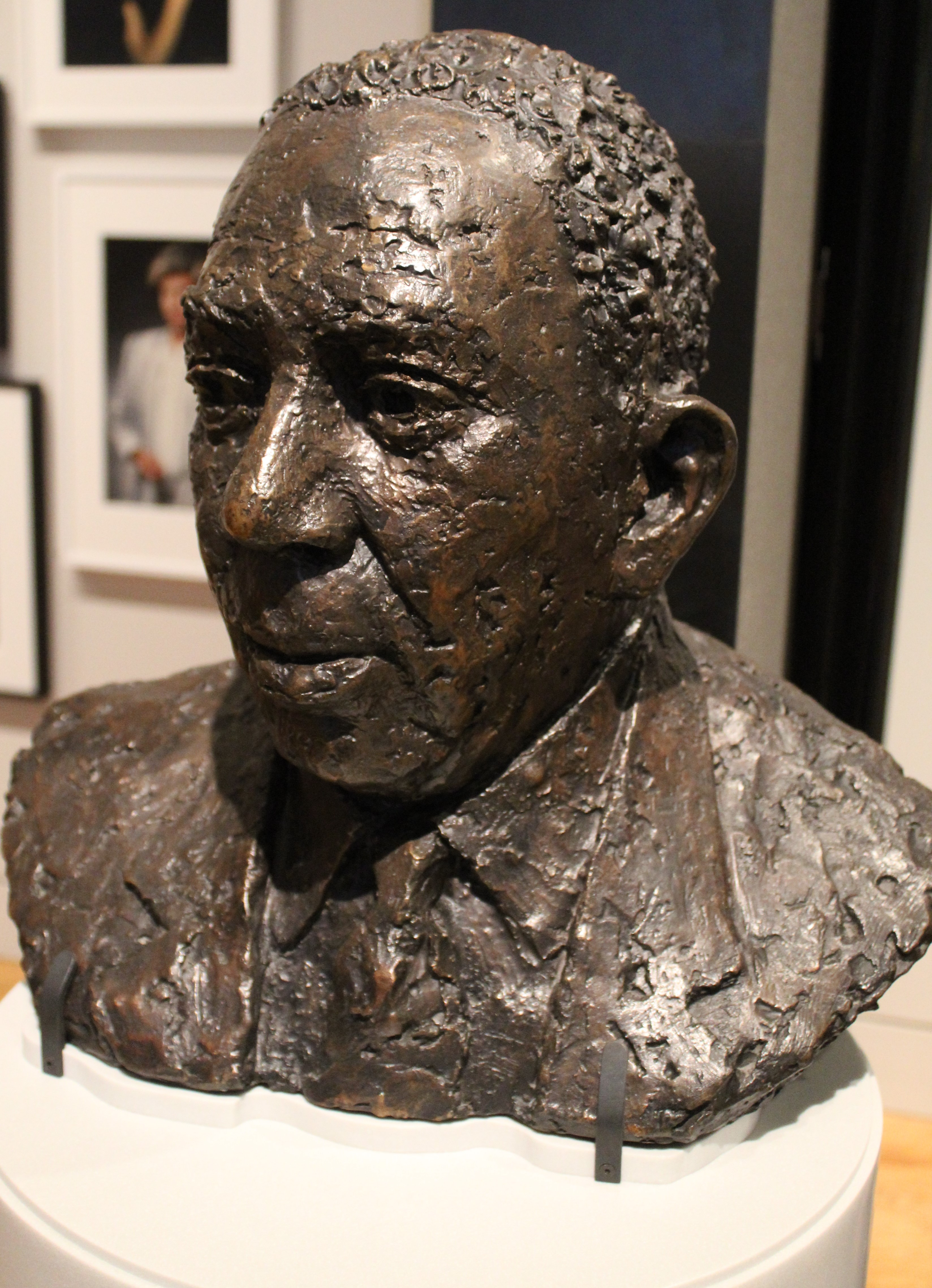
Bust of Constantine by Karin Jonzen in the National Portrait Gallery, London

For the remainder of his life, Constantine lived in London. He returned to legal practice and was elected an Honorary Bencher of the Middle Temple in 1963. He also resumed work in journalism: he wrote and broadcast on cricket, race and the Commonwealth, and produced two more books: a coaching book The Young Cricketers Companion (1964), and The Changing Face of Cricket (1966) which included his thoughts on modern cricket. He made his debut as a television cricket commentator, although his failing health and talkative style meant he was less successful than on the radio. In 1965, he became a founding member of the Sports Council, which aimed to develop sport in Britain. Two years later, he was appointed to the three-person Race Relations Board, formed through the Race Relations Act, to investigate cases of racial discrimination. In this role he spoke out against the Commonwealth Immigrants Act, a stance that led to an offer from the Liberal Party, which he declined, to stand as parliamentary candidate for the Nelson and Colne constituency. Later, he was involved in an unsuccessful attempt to negotiate the release, after a military coup, of Abubakar Tafawa Balewa, the overthrown Prime Minister of Nigeria. Constantine was appointed to the BBC's General Advisory Committee in 1966 and became a BBC Governor two years later, although declining health restricted his involvement. The following year the students of St Andrews University elected Constantine as Rector, but again his health prevented him performing effectively in this role.

In his last years, Constantine was criticised for becoming part of the Establishment; Private Eye mocked him, while the new generation of West Indian immigrants believed he was out of touch. More radical black spokesmen disapproved of his conciliatory approach to racist incidents.

Constantine was awarded a life peerage in 1969 New Year Honours List, becoming the first black man to sit in the House of Lords; there were rumours that Trinidad and Tobago had prevented earlier attempts to ennoble him. He took the title of Baron Constantine, of Maraval in Trinidad and of Nelson in the County Palatine of Lancaster. His investiture attracted widespread media attention; Constantine stated: "I think it must have been for what I have endeavoured to do to make it possible for people of different colour to know each other better and live well together." He sat as a crossbencher in the House, but, due to failing health, was only able to make one speech in his time there.

Although Constantine was reluctant to leave England, his poor health necessitated a return to Trinidad and Tobago, but before he could do so he died of a heart attack, probably brought about by bronchitis, on 1 July 1971. His body was flown to Trinidad and Tobago, where he received a state funeral before being buried in Arouca. He was posthumously awarded Trinidad and Tobago's highest honour, the Trinity Cross. Later in the month, a memorial service was held in London in Westminster Abbey.

A collection of photographs, newspaper clippings, archival documents and memorabilia about Constantine's life is safeguarded and exhibited by Trinidad and Tobago's national library. This collection was inscribed in UNESCO's Memory of the World Register in 2011.

== Family life ==
Constantine met his future wife, Norma Agatha Cox, in 1921. She had little interest in cricket and, although their relationship developed during the early 1920s, she resented that he gave more time to cricket than he did to her. However, the relationship lasted and she began to take more of an interest in his sporting achievements. They were married on 25 July 1927; their only child, Gloria, was born in April 1928.

Throughout their marriage, his wife motivated him to continue his efforts to further his career and they remained close. Norma, Lady Constantine, died two months after her husband's death in 1971.

== Legacy ==
Constantine is commemorated by a blue plaque, erected in 2013 by English Heritage at 101 Lexham Gardens, Kensington, London, his home from 1949 to 1954.

== Personality ==
John Arlott describes Constantine as a man of "easy humour and essential patience ... His outlook was that of a compassionate radical and he maintained his high moral standards unswervingly." E. W. Swanton writes: "None could call Lord Constantine a modest man, but gifts of warmth and friendliness as well as a shrewd brain and a ready tongue helped to make him one of the personalities of his time." He did not get along with everyone; he and England cricketer Wally Hammond feuded for nearly ten years over what Constantine perceived as a slight in 1925–26. Subsequently, Constantine continually bowled short when he encountered Hammond on the field, until the pair made peace in the Old Trafford Test match of 1933. After this, they pursued a more good-natured rivalry and became quite friendly; Hammond publicly expressed sympathy towards Constantine and other black West Indians for the discrimination that they faced.

In his earlier years, acquaintances believed Constantine was too conscious of colour. James wrote: "Many doors in England were open to him. That doors were closed to other West Indians seemed more important to him." Michael Manley describes him as an extrovert who displayed great self-belief in everything he did. He also notes that "Constantine was too long in England and perhaps too slight in Test-match performance to make the impact on the Caribbean that he did on England. But he enchanted England." Gerald Howat wrote: "Cricket apart ... Constantine's reputation must rest on his contribution to racial tolerance, his benevolent view of empire and Commonwealth, and his personal acceptance within the British 'establishment'. In the end he was more English than Trinidadian and he needed that wider platform."

== See also ==
- Black British elite, Constantine's class in Britain
- Billy Strachan, pioneer of Black civil rights in Britain
- Trevor Carter, leading Black civil rights leader in London
- Una Marson, fellow advisor to British government during WWII on racial issues

== Bibliography ==
- Cricket and I. London: Philip Allan. 1933. OCLC 761390201.
- Cricket in the Sun. London: Stanley Paul. 1947. OCLC 2599524.
- Cricketers' Carnival. London: Stanley Paul. 1948. OCLC 712737671.
- Cricketers' Cricket. London: Eyre & Spottiswoode. 1949. OCLC 712823063.
- Cricket Crackers. London: Stanley Paul. 1950. OCLC 265430007.
- How to Play Cricket. London: Eyre & Spottiswoode. 1951. OCLC 7184447.
- Colour Bar. London: Stanley Paul. 1954. OCLC 2205021.
- (with Denzil Batchelor) The Changing Face of Cricket. London: Eyre & Spottiswoode. 1966. OCLC 6313368.

== Sources ==
- Douglas, Christopher (2002). Douglas Jardine: Spartan Cricketer. London: Methuen. ISBN 0-413-77216-0.
- Frith, David (2002). Bodyline Autopsy. The full story of the most sensational Test cricket series: Australia v England 1932–33. London: Aurum Press. ISBN 1-85410-896-4.
- Howat, Gerald (1976). Learie Constantine. Newton Abbot: Readers Union Limited. (Book Club edition. First published London, 1975. Allen & Unwin. ISBN 0-04-920043-7)
- James, C. L. R. (1983) [1963]. Beyond a Boundary. London: Serpent's Tail. ISBN 1-85242-358-7.
- Manley, Michael (1995) [1988]. A History of West Indies Cricket. London: Andre Deutsch. ISBN 0-233-98937-4.
- Mason, Peter (2008). Learie Constantine. Oxford: Signal Books Limited. ISBN 978-1-904955-42-9.
- Robertson-Glasgow, R. C. (1943). Cricket Prints: Some Batsmen and Bowlers, 1920–1940. London: T. Werner Laurie Ltd. OCLC 3257334.
- Swanton, E. W. (1999). Cricketers of My Time. London: Andre Deutsch. ISBN 0-233-99746-6.

Academic offices
Preceded by John Rothenstein	Rector of the University of St Andrews; 1967–1970	Succeeded by John Cleese
