= Victor Pascall =

Trinidadian cricketer

Personal information
- Born: 1886; Diego Martin, Trinidad
- Died: 7 July 1930 (aged 43–44); Port of Spain, Trinidad and Tobago
- Batting: Left-handed
- Bowling: Left-arm orthodox spin
- Relatives: Learie Constantine (nephew); Elias Constantine (nephew); Lebrun Constantine (brother-in-law)

Domestic team information
- Years: Team
- 1906–1928: Trinidad

Career statistics
Competition	First-class
Matches	49
Runs scored	859
Batting average	13.63
100s/50s	0/2
Top score	92
Balls bowled	9,290
Wickets	171
Bowling average	20.09
5 wickets in innings	6
10 wickets in match	1
Best bowling	6/26
Catches/stumpings	32/0
- Source: CricketArchive, 26 September 2011

Victor S. Pascall (1886 – 7 July 1930) was a Trinidadian cricketer who represented the West Indies in the days before they achieved Test status. His primary role was as a left-arm spinner, but was regarded as a reasonable batsman. Pascall was related to the Constantine family; he was the maternal uncle of Elias and Learie Constantine and was a possible coaching influence on the latter. At the time he played, critics considered him the best left-arm spinner in the West Indies.

Pascall was born in Diego Martin, Trinidad, at some time in 1886. His parents were Yoruba from West Africa who were brought to South America as slaves. According to family legend, Pascall's father, Ali, escaped as a child and sailed to Trinidad. Ali lived to be around 100 years old and maintained some African traditions in the family.

Pascall first played for Trinidad in 1906, making his first-class debut and taking a wicket in the final of the Inter-Colonial Tournament. From 1909, he played regularly in the team and appeared in the Inter-Colonial tournament until 1927. In total, he played 24 times for Trinidad to score 513 runs at a batting average of 15.08 and take 102 wickets at a bowling average of 17.39. He twice played innings of over 50 runs and took more than five wickets in six innings. He first represented a combined West Indies team in 1913 when he took four wickets for 83 runs for West Indies against a Marylebone Cricket Club (MCC) team which was touring the region. Then in 1923, he was chosen as part of the West Indies team which toured England. Pascall played 19 matches on the tour and took 52 wickets at an average of 24.30. His best figures were five for 67 against Cambridge University and six for 77 against MCC at Lord's Cricket Ground. His final appearances for West Indies came in 1926. In 22 games for teams styled "West Indies" or "West Indians", Pascall hit 268 runs at an average of 10.31 and took 59 wickets at 25.20. In all first-class cricket, he 859 runs at 13.63, with a top score of 92 against Barbados in 1922, and took 171 wickets at 20.09, with best figures of six for 26 against British Guiana, also in 1922.

In Trinidad, Pascall represented the Shannon team and was used as the third bowler. The Shannon club was made up of members of the black lower-middle classes, and contained several international players. The team played in a highly competitive manner and were passionately supported by their spectators and, according to C. L. R. James, socially "represented the great mass of black people in the island." Shannon players took part in games in a serious manner and were not given to smiling on the field, but Pascall, while a formidable opponent, was more friendly. The people of Trinidad regarded Pascall with great affection, and James described him as "a most charming person and a great popular favourite with all classes" on the island. On one occasion in 1921, Pascall bowled particularly effectively in the Inter-Colonial Tournament, which was held in Trinidad that year, and James wrote some comic verses about how good his bowling was; these were well received by the public.

Pascall died on 7 July 1930.

== Bibliography ==
- Howat, Gerald (1976). Learie Constantine. Newton Abbot: Readers Union Limited.
- James, C. L. R. (1983) [1963]. Beyond a Boundary. London: Serpent's Tail. ISBN 1-85242-358-7.
