= 1995 Fed Cup Americas Zone Group I – Pool A =

International tennis competition

Group A of the 1995 Fed Cup Americas Zone Group I was one of two pools in the Americas Zone Group I of the 1995 Fed Cup. Four teams competed in a round robin competition, with the top two teams advancing to the knockout stage and the bottom team being relegated down to Group II for 1996.

	(Mexico) MEX	(Colombia) COL	(Venezuela) VEN	(Peru) PER	RR; W–L	Set; W–L	Game; W–L	Standings
Mexico		2–1	2–1	3–0	3–0	14–6	121–84	1
Colombia	1–2		2–1	2–1	2–1	11–10	109–115	2
Venezuela	1–2	1–2		3–0	1–2	12–9	107–98	3
Peru	0–3	1–2	0–3		0–3	4–16	75–115	4

== Mexico vs. Colombia ==
Mexico
2
Caracas Sports Club, Caracas, Venezuela
11 April 1995
Hard (outdoors)

Colombia
1

			1	2	3
1	(Mexico) (Colombia)	Jessica Fernández; Carmiña Giraldo	6^{4} 7^{7}	7; 5	13; 11
2	(Mexico) (Colombia)	Angélica Gavaldón; Fabiola Zuluaga	3; 6	6^{2} 7^{7}
3	(Mexico) (Colombia)	Lucila Becerra / Angélica Gavaldón; Cecilia Hincapié / Mariana Mesa	6; 3	6; 1

== Venezuela vs. Peru ==
Venezuela
3
Caracas Sports Club, Caracas, Venezuela
11 April 1995
Hard (outdoors)

Peru
0

			1	2	3
1	(Venezuela) (Peru)	María Virginia Francesa; María Eugenia Rojas	6; 4	5; 7	6; 4
2	(Venezuela) (Peru)	Ninfa Marra; Carla Rodríguez	6; 2	6; 3
3	(Venezuela) (Peru)	María Virginia Francesa / Ninfa Marra; Déborah Gaviria / María Eugenia Rojas	7; 5	6; 3

== Mexico vs. Peru ==
Mexico
3
Caracas Sports Club, Caracas, Venezuela
12 April 1995
Hard (outdoors)

Peru
0

			1	2	3
1	(Mexico) (Peru)	Karin Palme; Déborah Gaviria	6^{3} 7^{7}	6; 3	6; 0
2	(Mexico) (Peru)	Angélica Gavaldón; Carla Rodríguez	6; 2	7^{7} 6^{4}
3	(Mexico) (Peru)	Lucila Becerra / Angélica Gavaldón; Déborah Gaviria / María Eugenia Rojas	6; 3	6; 0

== Colombia vs. Venezuela ==
Colombia
2
Caracas Sports Club, Caracas, Venezuela
12 April 1995
Hard (outdoors)

Venezuela
1

			1	2	3
1	(Colombia) (Venezuela)	Carmiña Giraldo; María Virginia Francesa	7^{7} 6^{4}	1; 6	6; 3
2	(Colombia) (Venezuela)	Fabiola Zuluaga; Ninfa Marra	3; 6	7; 5	6; 3
3	(Colombia) (Venezuela)	Carmiña Giraldo / Fabiola Zuluaga; María Virginia Francesa / Ninfa Marra	4; 6	5; 7

== Mexico vs. Venezuela ==
Mexico
2
Caracas Sports Club, Caracas, Venezuela
13 April 1995
Hard (outdoors)

Venezuela
1

			1	2	3
1	(Mexico) (Venezuela)	Jessica Fernández; María Virginia Francesa	2; 6	4; 6
2	(Mexico) (Venezuela)	Angélica Gavaldón; Ninfa Marra	6; 2	6; 1
3	(Mexico) (Venezuela)	Lucila Becerra / Angélica Gavaldón; María Virginia Francesa / Ninfa Marra	6; 3	7; 5

== Colombia vs. Peru ==
Colombia
2
Caracas Sports Club, Caracas, Venezuela
13 April 1995
Hard (outdoors)

Peru
1

			1	2	3
1	(Colombia) (Peru)	Carmiña Giraldo; María Eugenia Rojas	6; 4	6; 3
2	(Colombia) (Peru)	Fabiola Zuluaga; Carla Rodríguez	2; 6	4; 6
3	(Colombia) (Peru)	Carmiña Giraldo / Cecilia Hincapié; Déborah Gaviria / Carla Rodríguez	6; 3	6; 4

- Peru placed last in the pool, and thus was relegated to Group II in 1996, where they placed first in their pool of seven and as such advanced back to Group I for 1997.

== See also ==
- Fed Cup structure
