= 1996 Fed Cup Americas Zone Group I – Knockout Stage =

International tennis competition knockout stage

The Knockout Stage of the 1996 Fed Cup Americas Zone Group I was the final stage of the Zonal Competition involving teams from the Americas. Those that qualified for this stage placed first and second in their respective pools.

Placing	Pool A	Pool B
1	Chile	Venezuela
2	Colombia	Brazil
3	Mexico	Puerto Rico
4	Paraguay	Uruguay

The four teams were then randomly drawn into a two-stage knockout tournament, with the winner advancing to the World Group II Play-offs.

== Draw ==
Semifinals; 27 April
Chile	2
Brazil	1
Colombia	2
Venezuela	1

Final; 28 April
Chile	2
Colombia	1

=== Semifinals ===
==== Chile vs. Brazil ====
Chile
2
Club Palestino, Santiago, Chile
27 April 1996
Red clay (outdoors)

Brazil
1

			1	2	3
1	(Chile) (Brazil)	Paula Cabezas; Miriam D'Agostini	6; 3	3; 6	0; 6
2	(Chile) (Brazil)	Bárbara Castro; Luciana Tella	6; 4	6; 3
3	(Chile) (Brazil)	Paula Cabezas / Bárbara Castro; Vanessa Menga / Luciana Tella	6; 2	6; 4

==== Colombia vs. Venezuela ====
Colombia
2
Club Palestino, Santiago, Chile
27 April 1996
Red clay (outdoors)

Venezuela
1

			1	2	3
1	(Colombia) (Venezuela)	Fabiola Zuluaga; María Vento	7; 5	6; 1
2	(Colombia) (Venezuela)	Carmiña Giraldo; Melissa Mazzotta	6^{3} 7^{7}	1; 6
3	(Colombia) (Venezuela)	Ximena Rodríguez / Fabiola Zuluaga; María Virginia Francesa / Ninfa Marra	6; 3	7; 5

=== Final ===
==== Chile vs. Colombia ====
Chile
2
Club Palestino, Santiago, Chile
28 April 1996
Red clay (outdoors)

Colombia
1

			1	2	3
1	(Chile) (Colombia)	Bárbara Castro; Fabiola Zuluaga	0; 6	1; 6
2	(Chile) (Colombia)	Paula Cabezas; Carmiña Giraldo	7; 5	7; 5
3	(Chile) (Colombia)	Paula Cabezas / Bárbara Castro; Ximena Rodríguez / Fabiola Zuluaga	6; 0	7; 5

- Chile advanced to the World Group II Play-offs, where they were drawn against Croatia. However, they lost 0–5, and thus returned to the Americas Zone Group I in 1997.

== See also ==
- Fed Cup structure
