= 1995 Fed Cup World Group II play-offs =

Tennis competition play-offs

The 1995 World Group II play-offs were four ties which involved the losing nations of the World Group II and four nations from the three Zonal Group I competitions. Nations that won their play-off ties entered the 1996 World Group II, while losing nations joined their respective zonal groups.

== Belgium vs. South Korea ==
Belgium
3
Ostend Tennis Club, Ostend, Belgium
22–23 July 1995
Red clay (outdoors)

South Korea
2

			1	2	3
1	(Belgium) (South Korea)	Laurence Courtois; Park Sung-hee	4; 6	6; 3	2; 6
2	(Belgium) (South Korea)	Sabine Appelmans; Kim Eun-ha	6; 0	6; 2
3	(Belgium) (South Korea)	Sabine Appelmans; Park Sung-hee	6; 3	6; 3
4	(Belgium) (South Korea)	Laurence Courtois; Kim Eun-ha	2; 6	4; 6
5	(Belgium) (South Korea)	Sabine Appelmans / Nancy Feber; Choi Ju-yeon / Kim Eun-ha	6; 1	6; 1

== Czech Republic vs. Sweden ==
Czech Republic
4
Hotel Club, Prague, Czech Republic
22–23 July 1995
Greenset Trophy (indoors)

Sweden
1

			1	2	3
1	(Czech Republic) (Sweden)	Helena Suková; Maria Strandlund	6; 2	6; 3
2	(Czech Republic) (Sweden)	Petra Langrová; Åsa Carlsson	4; 6	3; 6
3	(Czech Republic) (Sweden)	Helena Suková; Åsa Carlsson	4; 6	6; 4	6; 3
4	(Czech Republic) (Sweden)	Petra Langrová; Maria Strandlund	6; 2	6; 2
5	(Czech Republic) (Sweden)	Petra Langrová / Helena Suková; Annica Lindstedt / Maria Lindström	6; 4	6; 1

== Italy vs. Indonesia ==
Italy
2
La Querce Tennis Club, Salerno, Italy
22–23 July 1995
Red clay (outdoors)

Indonesia
3

			1	2	3
1	(Italy) (Indonesia)	Silvia Farina; Romana Tedjakusuma	6; 4	6; 0
2	(Italy) (Indonesia)	Adriana Serra Zanetti; Yayuk Basuki	6^{2} 7^{7}	5; 7
3	(Italy) (Indonesia)	Silvia Farina; Yayuk Basuki	4; 6	6^{3} 7^{7}
4	(Italy) (Indonesia)	Adriana Serra Zanetti; Romana Tedjakusuma	7^{7} 6^{4}	6; 3
5	(Italy) (Indonesia)	Silvia Farina / Adriana Serra Zanetti; Yayuk Basuki / Romana Tedjakusuma	6^{4} 7^{7}	1; 6

== Paraguay vs. Slovakia ==
Paraguay
0
Asunción Yacht & Golf Club, Asunción, Paraguay
22–23 July 1995
Red clay (outdoors)

Slovakia
5

			1	2	3
1	(Paraguay) (Slovakia)	Larissa Schaerer; Henrieta Nagyová	2; 6	1; 6
2	(Paraguay) (Slovakia)	Magalí Benítez; Karina Habšudová	1; 6	1; 6
3	(Paraguay) (Slovakia)	Larissa Schaerer; Karina Habšudová	3; 6	7^{7} 6^{2}	3; 6
4	(Paraguay) (Slovakia)	Magalí Benítez; Henrieta Nagyová	4; 6	2; 6
5	(Paraguay) (Slovakia)	Magalí Benítez / Larissa Schaerer; Karina Habšudová / Denisa Szabová	6; 4	4; 6	2; 6

== See also ==
- Fed Cup structure
