= 1996 Fed Cup Americas Zone Group I – Pool B =

Group B of the 1996 Fed Cup Americas Zone Group I was one of two pools in the Americas Zone Group I of the 1996 Fed Cup. Four teams competed in a round robin competition, with the top two teams advancing to the knockout stage.

	(Venezuela) VEN	(Brazil) BRA	(Puerto Rico) PUR	(Uruguay) URU	RR; W–L	Set; W–L	Game; W–L	Standings
Venezuela		3–0	3–0	3–0	3–0	18–2	121–65	1
Brazil	0–3		3–0	3–0	2–1	10–7	91–75	2
Puerto Rico	0–3	0–3		2–1	1–2	5–14	66–105	3
Uruguay	0–3	0–3	1–2		0–3	5–15	82–115	4

== Venezuela vs. Puerto Rico ==
Venezuela
3
Club Palestino, Santiago, Chile
24 April 1996
Red clay (outdoors)

Puerto Rico
0

			1	2	3
1	(Venezuela) (Puerto Rico)	Melissa Mazzotta; Emilie Viqueira	7; 5	6; 1
2	(Venezuela) (Puerto Rico)	María Vento; Joanne Bauzà	6; 0	6; 0
3	(Venezuela) (Puerto Rico)	María Virginia Francesa / Ninfa Marra; Jenny Sotomayor / Tari Ann Toró	6; 2	7; 5

== Brazil vs. Uruguay ==
Brazil
3
Club Palestino, Santiago, Chile
24 April 1996
Red clay (outdoors)

Uruguay
0

			1	2	3
1	(Brazil) (Uruguay)	Luciana Tella; María Eugenia Fernández	6; 1	2; 6	11; 9
2	(Brazil) (Uruguay)	Miriam D'Agostini; Claudia Brause	6; 2	6; 2
3	(Brazil) (Uruguay)	Miriam D'Agostini / Vanessa Menga; Claudia Brause / Elena Juricich	1; 2			retired

== Venezuela vs. Uruguay ==
Venezuela
3
Club Palestino, Santiago, Chile
25 April 1996
Red clay (outdoors)

Uruguay
0

			1	2	3
1	(Venezuela) (Uruguay)	Melissa Mazzotta; Claudia Brause	7^{10} 6^{8}	6; 2
2	(Venezuela) (Uruguay)	María Vento; María Eugenia Fernández	3; 6	6; 2	6; 4
3	(Venezuela) (Uruguay)	Melissa Mazzotta / María Vento; Claudia Brause / María Eugenia Fernández	6; 1	6^{3} 7^{7}	6; 3

== Brazil vs. Puerto Rico ==
Brazil
3
Club Palestino, Santiago, Chile
25 April 1996
Red clay (outdoors)

Puerto Rico
0

			1	2	3
1	(Brazil) (Puerto Rico)	Miriam D'Agostini; Joanne Bauzà	6; 2	6; 2
2	(Brazil) (Puerto Rico)	Eugenia Maia; Emilie Viqueira	7; 5	7; 5
3	(Brazil) (Puerto Rico)	Vanessa Menga / Luciana Tella; Jenny Sotomayor / Emilie Viqueira	6; 2	6; 0

== Venezuela vs. Brazil ==
Venezuela
3
Club Palestino, Santiago, Chile
26 April 1996
Red clay (outdoors)

Brazil
0

			1	2	3
1	(Venezuela) (Brazil)	Melissa Mazzotta; Vanessa Menga	6; 3	7^{7} 6^{3}
2	(Venezuela) (Brazil)	María Vento; Luciana Tella	6; 3	6; 2
3	(Venezuela) (Brazil)	María Virginia Francesa / Ninfa Marra; Miriam D'Agostini / Vanessa Menga	6; 3	6; 4

== Puerto Rico vs. Uruguay ==
Puerto Rico
2
Club Palestino, Santiago, Chile
26 April 1996
Red clay (outdoors)

Uruguay
1

			1	2	3
1	(Puerto Rico) (Uruguay)	Joanne Bauzà; María Eugenia Fernández	6; 3	3; 6	3; 6
2	(Puerto Rico) (Uruguay)	Emilie Viqueira; Claudia Brause	6; 2	6; 1
3	(Puerto Rico) (Uruguay)	Joanne Bauzà / Emilie Viqueira; Claudia Brause / María Eugenia Fernández	6; 2	1; 6	6; 3

- Uruguay placed last in the pool, and thus was relegated to Group II in 1997, where they placed first in their pool of eight and as such advanced back to Group I for 1998.

== See also ==
- Fed Cup structure
