= 1995 Fed Cup Americas Zone Group I – Knockout Stage =

International tennis competition

The Knockout Stage of the 1995 Fed Cup Americas Zone Group I was the final stage of the Zonal Competition involving teams from the Americas. Those that qualified for this stage placed first and second in their respective pools.

Placing	Pool A	Pool B
1	Mexico	Paraguay
2	Colombia	Brazil
3	Venezuela	Chile
4	Peru	Cuba

The four teams were then randomly drawn into a two-stage knockout tournament, with the winner advancing to the World Group II Play-offs.

== Draw ==
Semifinals; 14 April
Mexico	2
Colombia	0
Brazil	0
Paraguay	2

Final; 15 April
Mexico	0
Paraguay	2

=== Semifinals ===
==== Mexico vs. Colombia ====
Mexico
2
Caracas Sports Club, Caracas, Venezuela
14 April 1995
Hard (outdoors)

Colombia
0

			1	2	3
1	(Mexico) (Colombia)	Karin Palme; Carmiña Giraldo	7; 5	7^{9} 6^{7}
2	(Mexico) (Colombia)	Angélica Gavaldón; Fabiola Zuluaga	6; 2	6; 4
3	(Mexico) (Colombia)					not played

==== Paraguay vs. Brazil ====
Paraguay
2
Caracas Sports Club, Caracas, Venezuela
14 April 1995
Hard (outdoors)

Brazil
0

			1	2	3
1	(Paraguay) (Brazil)	Magalí Benítez; Patrícia Segala	3; 6	6; 1	6; 3
2	(Paraguay) (Brazil)	Larissa Schaerer; Miriam D'Agostini	6; 2	6; 4
3	(Paraguay) (Brazil)					not played

=== Final ===
==== Mexico vs. Paraguay ====
Mexico
0
Caracas Sports Club, Caracas, Venezuela
15 April 1995
Hard (outdoors)

Paraguay
2

			1	2	3
1	(Mexico) (Paraguay)	Jessica Fernández; Magalí Benítez	2; 6	2; 6
2	(Mexico) (Paraguay)	Angélica Gavaldón; Larissa Schaerer	0; 3			retired
3	(Mexico) (Paraguay)					not played

- Paraguay advanced to the World Group II Play-offs, where they were drawn against Slovakia. However, they lost 0–5, and thus returned to the Americas Zone Group I in 1996.

== See also ==
- Fed Cup structure
