= 1996 Fed Cup Americas Zone Group I – Pool A =

International tennis competition

Group A of the 1996 Fed Cup Americas Zone Group I was one of two pools in the Americas Zone Group I of the 1996 Fed Cup. Four teams competed in a round robin competition, with the top two teams advancing to the knockout stage.

	(Chile) CHI	(Colombia) COL	(Mexico) MEX	(Paraguay) PAR	RR; W–L	Set; W–L	Game; W–L	Standings
Chile		2–1	2–1	2–1	3–0	13–7	105–68	1
Colombia	1–2		3–0	2–1	2–1	13–6	99–70	2
Mexico	1–2	0–3		2–1	1–2	8–13	82–102	3
Paraguay	1–2	1–2	1–2		0–3	7–15	74–157	4

== Chile vs. Mexico ==
Chile
2
Club Palestino, Santiago, Chile
24 April 1996
Red clay (outdoors)

Mexico
1

			1	2	3
1	(Chile) (Mexico)	Paula Cabezas; Jessica Fernández	6; 3	3; 6	6; 1
2	(Chile) (Mexico)	Bárbara Castro; Karin Palme	4; 6	4; 6
3	(Chile) (Mexico)	Paula Cabezas / Bárbara Castro; Jessica Fernández / Paola Palencia	6; 1	6; 3

== Colombia vs. Paraguay ==
Colombia
2
Club Palestino, Santiago, Chile
24 April 1996
Red clay (outdoors)

Paraguay
1

			1	2	3
1	(Colombia) (Paraguay)	Carmiña Giraldo; Viviana Valdovinos	6; 1	6; 3
2	(Colombia) (Paraguay)	Fabiola Zuluaga; Larissa Schaerer	6; 3	6; 2
3	(Colombia) (Paraguay)	Ximena Rodríguez / Fabiola Zuluaga; Laura Bernal / Larissa Schaerer	6^{7} 7^{9}	6; 2	4; 6

== Chile vs. Paraguay ==
Chile
2
Club Palestino, Santiago, Chile
25 April 1996
Red clay (outdoors)

Paraguay
1

			1	2	3
1	(Chile) (Paraguay)	Bárbara Castro; Larissa Schaerer	6; 3	3; 6	4; 6
2	(Chile) (Paraguay)	Paula Cabezas; Viviana Valdovinos	6; 1	6; 0
3	(Chile) (Paraguay)	Paula Cabezas / Bárbara Castro; Laura Bernal / Larissa Schaerer	6; 1	6; 3

== Colombia vs. Mexico ==
Colombia
3
Club Palestino, Santiago, Chile
25 April 1996
Red clay (outdoors)

Mexico
0

			1	2	3
1	(Colombia) (Mexico)	Carmiña Giraldo; Jessica Fernández	6; 4	6; 0
2	(Colombia) (Mexico)	Fabiola Zuluaga; Karin Palme	6; 0	7; 5
3	(Colombia) (Mexico)	Ximena Rodríguez / Fabiola Zuluaga; Jessica Fernández / Paola Palencia	6; 2	6; 2

== Chile vs. Colombia ==
Chile
2
Club Palestino, Santiago, Chile
26 April 1996
Red clay (outdoors)

Colombia
1

			1	2	3
1	(Chile) (Colombia)	Bárbara Castro; Carmiña Giraldo	7; 5	6; 2
2	(Chile) (Colombia)	Paula Cabezas; Catalina Castaño	6; 2	6; 0
3	(Chile) (Colombia)	María-Alejandra Quezada / Paulina Sepúlveda; Ximena Rodríguez / Fabiola Zuluaga	2; 6	6^{3} 7^{7}

== Mexico vs. Paraguay ==
Mexico
2
Club Palestino, Santiago, Chile
26 April 1996
Red clay (outdoors)

Paraguay
1

			1	2	3
1	(Mexico) (Paraguay)	Karin Palme; Larissa Schaerer	5; 7	6; 4	6; 1
2	(Mexico) (Paraguay)	Jessica Fernández; Laura Bernal	6; 0	6; 1
3	(Mexico) (Paraguay)	Jessica Fernández / Karin Palme; Laura Bernal / Ana Valeria Rolón	7; 5	4; 6	3; 6

- Paraguay placed last in the pool, and thus was relegated to Group II in 1997, where they placed first in their pool of seven and as such advanced back to Group I for 1998.

== See also ==
- Fed Cup structure
