= Patrícia Segala =

Brazilian tennis player

- Country (sports): Brazil
- Born: 8 May 1976 (age 48)
- Prize money: $13,945

Singles
- Career record: 48–34
- Career titles: 2 ITF
- Highest ranking: No. 350 (19 Jun 1995)

Doubles
- Career record: 17–27
- Highest ranking: No. 368 (18 Sep 1995)

Patrícia Segala (born 8 May 1976) is a Brazilian former professional tennis player.

Segala competed on the professional tour in the 1990s and reached a career high singles ranking of 350 in the world, with two ITF titles to her name. In 1993 she qualified for the main draw of the WTA Tour tournament in Curitaba. She was a member of Brazil's 1995 Fed Cup team, appearing in four ties. From her four singles rubbers she was the winner in one, against Chile's Bárbara Castro.

== ITF finals ==
=== Singles: 4 (2–2) ===
Outcome	No.	Date	Tournament	Surface	Opponent	Score
Runner-up	1.	Sep 1993	Bogotá, Colombia	Clay	(Brazil) Sumara Passos	2–6, 2–6
Winner	1.	Mar 1995	Cartagena, Colombia	Hard	(Belgium) Caroline Bodart	6–2, 6–3
Winner	2.	May 1995	Balaguer, Spain	Clay	(Spain) Rosa María Pérez	3–6, 6–3, 6–2
Runner-up	2.	May 1995	Mollet, Spain	Clay	(Belarus) Vera Zhukovets	6–7^{(4)}, 1–6

=== Doubles: 2 (0–2) ===
Outcome	No.	Date	Tournament	Surface	Partner	Opponents	Score
Runner-up	1.	Nov 1993	Belo Horizonte, Brazil	Clay	(Brazil) Renata Brito	(Argentina) Valeria Strappa (Argentina) Mariana Díaz Oliva	4–6, 1–6
Runner-up	2.	Mar 1995	Cartagena, Colombia	Hard	(Belgium) Caroline Bodart	(Colombia) Ximena Rodríguez (United Kingdom) Joanne Moore	1–6, 2–6
