= Magalí Benítez =

Paraguayan tennis player

- Country (sports): Paraguay
- Born: 9 December 1975 (age 50)
- Prize money: $16,276

Singles
- Career record: 62–44
- Career titles: 1 ITF
- Highest ranking: No. 350 (8 May 1995)

Doubles
- Career record: 33–35
- Career titles: 2 ITF
- Highest ranking: No. 306 (13 June 1994)

Magalí Benítez (born 9 December 1975) is a former professional tennis player from Paraguay.

Benítez won the Coffee Bowl junior tournament in 1993 and was a junior doubles quarterfinalist at the 1993 Wimbledon Championships. She went on to compete on the professional tour, reaching a best singles ranking of 350 in the world.

From 1993 to 1995, Benítez featured in a total 14 Fed Cup ties for Paraguay, finishing with a 13–6 overall record, with four singles wins and nine victories in doubles.

== ITF finals ==
=== Singles: 6 (1–5) ===
Result	No.	Date	Tournament	Surface	Opponent	Score
Loss	1.	28 September 1992	ITF Lima, Peru	Clay	(Chile) Paulina Sepúlveda	1–6, 4–6
Loss	2.	3 May 1993	ITF Buenos Aires, Argentina	Clay	(Argentina) Cintia Tortorella	6–4, 1–6, 1–6
Loss	3.	21 June 1993	ITF Covilhã, Portugal	Clay	(Netherlands) Anique Snijders	6–7^{(4)}, 6–1, 3–6
Loss	4.	6 September 1993	ITF Caracas, Venezuela	Clay	(Chile) Paula Cabezas	7–5, 2–6, 3–6
Win	1.	26 September 1994	ITF Lima, Peru	Hard	(United Kingdom) Joanne Moore	6–4, 3–6, 6–1
Loss	5.	17 October 1994	ITF Asunción, Paraguay	Clay	(Paraguay) Larissa Schaerer	4–6, 1–6

=== Doubles: 5 (2–3) ===
Result	No.	Date	Tournament	Surface	Partner	Opponents	Score
Loss	1.	26 October 1992	ITF Asunción, Paraguay	Clay	(Venezuela) Ninfa Marra	(Brazil) Christina Rozwadowski (Netherlands) Caroline Stassen	4–6, 1–6
Loss	2.	13 September 1993	ITF Bogotá, Colombia	Clay	(Chile) Bárbara Castro	(Greece) Christina Zachariadou (Ecuador) María Dolores Campana	3–6, 2–6
Win	1.	3 October 1993	ITF Lima, Peru	Clay	(Brazil) Miriam D'Agostini	(Colombia) Carmiña Giraldo (Colombia) Ximena Rodríguez	6–4, 6–2
Loss	3.	1 November 1993	ITF Asunción, Paraguay	Clay	(Paraguay) Larissa Schaerer	(Argentina) Mariana Díaz Oliva (Argentina) Valentina Solari	5–7, 5–7
Win	2.	22 May 1994	ITF Ratzeburg, Germany	Clay	(Ecuador) María Dolores Campana	(Moldova) Svetlana Komleva (Israel) Nelly Barkan	3–6, 7–5, 7–6^{(6)}
