= 1996 Fed Cup Americas Zone =

Subsection of tennis competition

The Americas Zone was one of three zones of regional competition in the 1996 Fed Cup.

== Group I ==
- Venue: Club Palestino, Santiago, Chile (outdoor clay)
- Date: 22–28 April

The eight teams were divided into two pools of four teams. The top two teams of each pool play-off in a two-round knockout stage to decide which nation progresses to World Group II play-offs. Nations finishing in the bottom place in each pool were relegated to Americas Zone Group II for 1997.

=== Pools ===
| | Pool A | CHI | COL | MEX | PAR |
| 1 | Chile (3–0) | | 2–1 | 2–1 | 2–1 |
| 2 | Colombia (2–1) | 1–2 | | 2–1 | 2–1 |
| 3 | Mexico (1–2) | 1–2 | 1–2 | | 2–1 |
| 4 | Paraguay (0–3) | 1–2 | 1–2 | 1–2 | |

| | Pool B | VEN | BRA | PUR | URU |
| 1 | Venezuela (3–0) | | 3–0 | 3–0 | 3–0 |
| 2 | Brazil (2–1) | 0–3 | | 3–0 | 3–0 |
| 3 | Puerto Rico (1–2) | 0–3 | 0–3 | | 2–1 |
| 4 | Uruguay (0–3) | 0–3 | 0–3 | 1–2 | |

=== Knockout stage ===
Semifinals; 27 April
Chile | 2
Brazil | 1
Colombia | 2
Venezuela | 1

Final; 28 April
Chile | 2
Colombia | 1

- Chile advanced to World Group II Play-offs.
- Paraguay and Uruguay relegated to Group II in 1997.

== Group II ==
- Venue: Santo Domingo, Dominican Republic (outdoor clay)
- Date: 6–12 May

The thirteen teams were divided into two pools of six and seven. The top team from each pool then moved would advance to Group I for 1997.

=== Pools ===
| | Pool A | ECU | BOL | ESA | GUA | BAH | BAR |
| 1 | Ecuador (5–0) | | 3–0 | 3–0 | 3–0 | 3–0 | 3–0 |
| 2 | Bolivia (4–1) | 0–3 | | 3–0 | 3–0 | 3–0 | 3–0 |
| 3 | El Salvador (3–2) | 0–3 | 0–3 | | 3–0 | 3–0 | 3–0 |
| 4 | Guatemala (2–3) | 0–3 | 0–3 | 0–3 | | 2–1 | 3–0 |
| 5 | Bahamas (1–4) | 0–3 | 0–3 | 0–3 | 1–2 | | 2–1 |
| 6 | Barbados (0–5) | 0–3 | 0–3 | 0–3 | 0–3 | 1–2 | |

| | Pool B | PER | CUB | DOM | CRC | TRI | JAM | BER |
| 1 | Peru (5–1) | | 1–2 | 3–0 | 3–0 | 2–1 | 3–0 | 3–0 |
| 2 | Cuba (5–1) | 2–1 | | 1–2 | 3–0 | 3–0 | 3–0 | 3–0 |
| 3 | Dominican Republic (5–1) | 0–3 | 2–1 | | 2–1 | 3–0 | 2–1 | 3–0 |
| 4 | Costa Rica (3–3) | 0–3 | 0–3 | 1–2 | | 3–0 | 2–1 | 2–1 |
| 5 | Trinidad and Tobago (2–4) | 1–2 | 0–3 | 0–3 | 0–3 | | 2–1 | 3–0 |
| 6 | Jamaica (1–5) | 0–3 | 0–3 | 1–2 | 1–2 | 1–2 | | 3–0 |
| 7 | Bermuda (0–6) | 0–3 | 0–3 | 0–3 | 1–2 | 0–3 | 0–3 | |

- Ecuador and Peru advanced to Group I in 1997.

== See also ==
- Fed Cup structure
