= Maraval =

Suburb of Port of Spain, Trinidad and Tobago

- Suburb
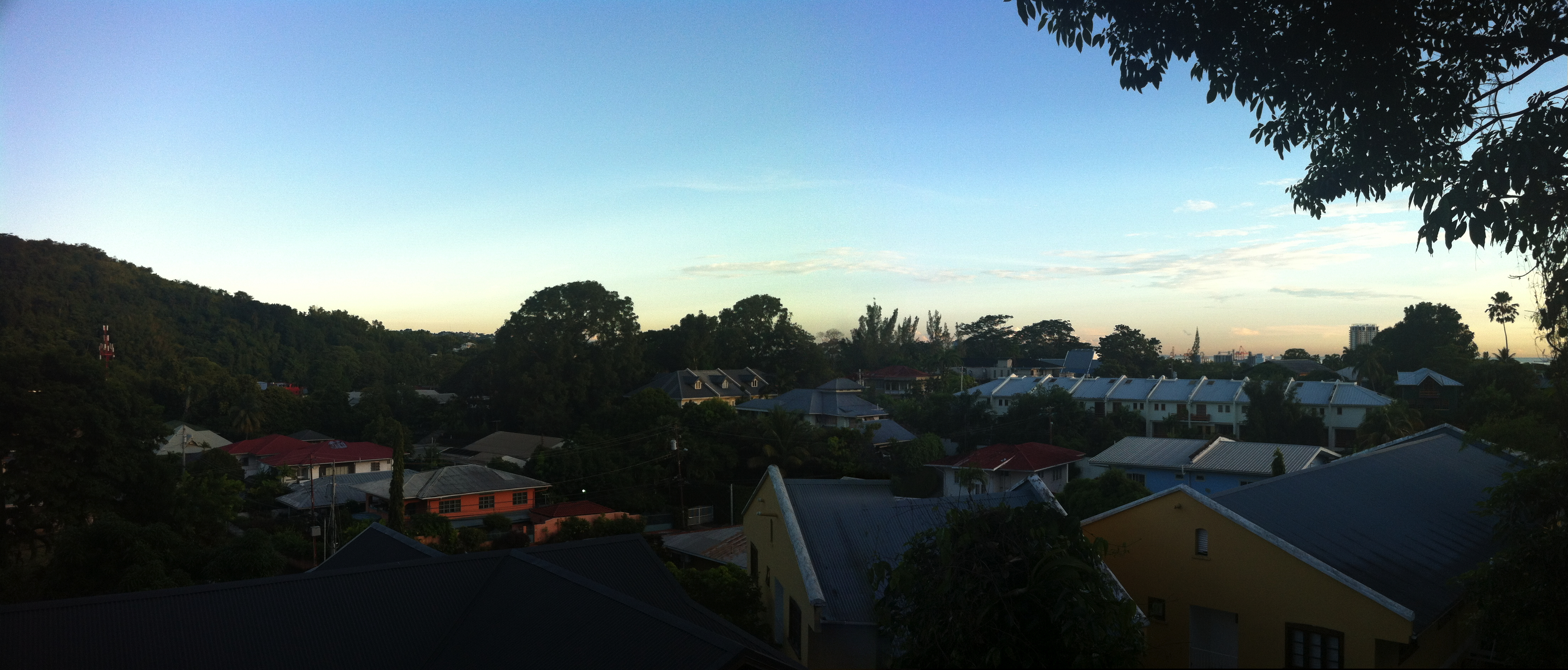
- View over Maraval

- Location in Trinidad
- Coordinates: 10°41′40″N 61°31′08″W
- Country: Trinidad and Tobago
- City: Port of Spain

Maraval is one of the northern suburbs of Trinidad's capital, Port of Spain, a valley in northern Trinidad in Trinidad and Tobago. It is situated at the bottom of the hills of Paramin and located east of the Diego Martin valley to which it is connected directly by Morne Coco Road, and west of Santa Cruz valley, to which it is connected by Saddle Road. It is administered by the Diego Martin Regional Corporation.

== Description ==
Maraval is considered one of the high-income residential areas in the country, and, in combination with the Westmoorings, Goodwood Park and Glencoe area, is home to much of the island's elite, including a number of diplomats. Some parts of Maraval are Champs Elysees, Fairways, Andalucia, Haleland Park and Moka.

Maraval is sometimes referred to as "Diego Martin East". It is home to Trinity College secondary school and St. Andrew's Golf Course and Club in Moka, which is one of the oldest in the world. Maraval arguably provides the best route of access from the capital to the North Coast.

Along with Santa Cruz, Maraval is located close to the best beaches on the island, allowing its residents quick access to both leisure activities, as well as downtown business and entertainment.

== Entertainment and popular culture ==
Maraval is also the home to many restaurants, shops, late-night cafes, and nightclubs.

== Amenities ==
=== Banks ===
Maraval has branches of the major locally operating banks, including Republic Bank and Scotiabank and well as RBTT, so residents do not have to go downtown to conduct business.

=== Churches and parish groups ===
There are church buildings located along the Saddle Road, Maraval, within one hundred yards of each other. These are:

Our Lady of Lourdes Roman Catholic Church which falls under the title R.C. Archdiocese of Port of Spain - Parish of Maraval. Within the Catholic Church there are beautiful stained glass windows, one of which acts as a remembrance to a Roman Catholic priest, a Fr. "Alvarez", who died close to one hundred years ago. The property is quite large and includes a Parish Hall and other buildings which will be covered in this section.

There is a Presbytery which is attached to the Parish Office which is located at the front of the compound. The buildings on the compound appears to be quite old. Over the years there have been modifications to the Presbytery Office which have allowed the Parish Office to continue to meet the needs of the public. Air conditioning units have been added and several of the open areas have been "closed off" to facilitate the preservation of the building and its contents.

Located in the Parish Hall are a Soup Kitchen which is managed by the Society of St. Vincent de Paul - Maraval Conference and which offers meals to the public. Also offered to the public are gently used items of clothing for persons of all ages and sizes.

Other groups belonging to the Catholic church meet on the compound and offer services to the parishioners and the public, such as the Kids Klub, Gentle Doves and Rite of Christian Initiation (RCIA).

A Seventh Day Adventist Church is also located in this area.

=== Catholic schools ===
There are at least two Catholic schools located in the area of Maraval. These are La Seiva Catholic Primary School and Maraval R.C. School. Both primary schools serve the children of the area. The Maraval R.C. School is located in the compound of the Roman Catholic Presbytery and Parish Office, however it is located on level of the church, (Our Lady of Lourdes).

=== Cemetery ===
Within the compound of the Lady of Lourdes Roman Catholic Church is a cemetery which is quite old. The cemetery is located above the church and the school and appears to stretch to the sky. The cemetery has been built to cater to the needs of the parish from then to now as there are more than five hundred plots on the site. Grave markers from the past have been retained and allow for a glimpse into the history of Trinidad and Tobago.

== Other ==
As with many urban and suburban areas in Trinidad, Maraval is prone to flash floods during the rainy season. During this period, houses built along the main roads or close rivers and streams are in danger of being flooded.

The West Indian cricketer Learie Constantine included 'Maraval' in his full title when, in 1969, he became a Life Peer and member of the British House of Lords.

On February 5, 2015, an El Pecos restaurant in Maraval exploded around 10:45 a.m. The explosion left 13 people severely injured and at least four were in critical condition. The explosion also destroyed the Burger King next to it, and caused millions of dollars in damages.
