= 1993 Federation Cup Americas Zone – play-offs =

The Play-offs of the 1993 Federation Cup Americas Zone were the final stages of the Zonal Competition involving teams from the Americas. Those that qualified for this stage placed first and second in their respective pools.

Placing	Pool A	Pool B	Pool C	Pool D
1	Paraguay	Peru	Chile	Mexico
2	Colombia	Trinidad and Tobago	Venezuela	Uruguay
3	Guatemala	Bolivia	Ecuador	El Salvador
4	Bahamas	Costa Rica	Jamaica	Puerto Rico
5		Barbados	Dominican Republic	

The eight teams were then randomly paired up to compete in four play-off ties, with the winners qualifying for the World Group.

== Colombia vs. Paraguay ==
Colombia
2
Palmas del Mar, Humacao, Puerto Rico
24 April 1993
Hard (outdoors)

Paraguay
1

			1	2	3
1	(Colombia) (Paraguay)	Carmiña Giraldo; Larissa Schaerer	0; 6	0; 6
2	(Colombia) (Paraguay)	Cecilia Hincapié; Rossana de los Ríos	6; 4	0; 6	6; 4
3	(Colombia) (Paraguay)	Carmiña Giraldo / Cecilia Hincapié; Rossana de los Ríos / Larissa Schaerer	6; 4	6; 4

== Peru vs. Venezuela ==
Peru
3
Palmas del Mar, Humacao, Puerto Rico
24 April 1993
Hard (outdoors)

Venezuela
0

			1	2	3
1	(Peru) (Venezuela)	Pilar Vásquez; Ninfa Marra	6; 1	6; 4
2	(Peru) (Venezuela)	Laura Gildemeister; María Virginia Francesa	7; 5	7; 5
3	(Peru) (Venezuela)	Gianfranca Devercelli / Pilar Vásquez; Ninfa Marra / Eleonora Vegliante	3; 6	6; 2	6; 3

== Chile vs. Trinidad and Tobago ==
Chile
3
Palmas del Mar, Humacao, Puerto Rico
24 April 1993
Hard (outdoors)

Trinidad and Tobago
0

			1	2	3
1	(Chile) (Trinidad and Tobago)	María-Alejandra Quezada; Kaisaran Siewrattan	6; 0	6; 2
2	(Chile) (Trinidad and Tobago)	Paula Cabezas; Elizabeth Gibson	6; 1	6; 0
3	(Chile) (Trinidad and Tobago)	Paula Cabezas / Bárbara Castro; Jacinta Ayers / Kaisaran Siewrattan	6; 4	6; 2

== Uruguay vs. Mexico ==
Uruguay
2
Palmas del Mar, Humacao, Puerto Rico
24 April 1993
Hard (outdoors)

Mexico
1

			1	2	3
1	(Uruguay) (Mexico)	Laura Olave; Xóchitl Escobedo	4; 6	6; 3	6; 2
2	(Uruguay) (Mexico)	Claudia Brause; Lucila Becerra	3; 6	6; 1	4; 6
3	(Uruguay) (Mexico)	Claudia Brause / Patricia Miller; Lucila Becerra / Isabela Petrov	6; 2	6; 4

- Colombia, Peru, Chile and Uruguay advanced to the World Group, where they were defeated in the first round by Japan, 3–0, China, 2–1, Finland, 3–0, and Sweden, 3–0, respectively.

== See also ==
- Fed Cup structure
