= 1994 Federation Cup World Group =

Part of tennis tournament

- Date: 18-24 July
- Edition: 4th

Champions
- Spain
- Fed Cup

The World Group was the highest level of Federation Cup competition in 1994. Thirty-two nations competed in a five-round knockout competition from 18 to 24 July. Spain was the defending champion, and they successfully defended their title defeating United States in the final.

== Participating teams ==
Participating Teams
Argentina	Australia	Austria	Belarus	Belgium	Bulgaria	Canada	Chile
China	Chinese Taipei	Colombia	Croatia	Cuba	Czech Republic	Denmark	Finland
France	Germany	Indonesia	Italy	Japan	Latvia	Netherlands	Paraguay
Poland	Slovakia	South Africa	South Korea	Spain	Sweden	Switzerland	United States

== Draw ==
First Round; 18–19 July
Spain	3
Q	Chile	0
Q	Cuba	0
Argentina	3
Q	Belgium	1
Sweden	2
China	1
Japan	2
Finland	1
Q	Slovakia	2
Germany	3
Colombia	0
South Africa	3
Q	Paraguay	0
Q	Belarus	1
Netherlands	2
France	3
South Korea	0
Italy	2
Denmark	1
Q	Chinese Taipei	1
Indonesia	2
Croatia	1
Bulgaria	2
United States	3
Czech Republic	0
Canada	3
Switzerland	0
Q	Austria	2
Poland	1
Latvia	1
Australia	2

Second Round; 20–21 July
Spain	3
Argentina	0
Sweden	0
Japan	3
Q	Slovakia	1
Germany	2
South Africa	2
Netherlands	1
France	3
Italy	0
Indonesia	0
Bulgaria	3
United States	3
Canada	0
Q	Austria	2
Australia	1

Quarterfinals; 22 July
Spain	3
Japan	0
Germany	3
South Africa	0
France	2
Bulgaria	1
United States	3
Q	Austria	0

Semifinals; 23 July
Spain	2
Germany	1
France	0
United States	3

Final; 24 July
Spain	3
United States	0

== First round ==
=== Spain vs. Chile ===
Spain
3
Waldstadion T.C., Frankfurt, Germany
19 July 1994
Clay (outdoors)

Chile
0

			1	2	3
1	(Spain) (Chile)	Conchita Martínez; María-Alejandra Quezada	6; 1	6; 0
2	(Spain) (Chile)	Arantxa Sánchez Vicario; Paula Cabezas	6; 1	6; 0
3	(Spain) (Chile)	Conchita Martínez / Arantxa Sánchez Vicario; Paula Cabezas / Bárbara Castro	6; 0	6; 1

=== Cuba vs. Argentina ===
Cuba
0
Waldstadion T.C., Frankfurt, Germany
18 July 1994
Clay (outdoors)

Argentina
3

			1	2	3
1	(Cuba) (Argentina)	Yoannis Montesino; Patricia Tarabini	4; 6	2; 6
2	(Cuba) (Argentina)	Belkis Rodríguez; Florencia Labat	1; 6	0; 6
3	(Cuba) (Argentina)	Yamile Cordova / Yoannis Montesino; Bettina Fulco / Florencia Labat	1; 6	4; 6

=== Belgium vs. Sweden ===
Belgium
1
Waldstadion T.C., Frankfurt, Germany
18–19 July 1994
Clay (outdoors)

Sweden
2

			1	2	3
1	(Belgium) (Sweden)	Dominique Monami; Maria Strandlund	4; 6	2; 6
2	(Belgium) (Sweden)	Sabine Appelmans; Åsa Carlsson	5; 7	6; 4	6; 2
3	(Belgium) (Sweden)	Sabine Appelmans / Dominique Monami; Maria Lindström / Maria Strandlund	6; 4	1; 6	3; 6

=== China vs. Japan ===
China
1
Waldstadion T.C., Frankfurt, Germany
18 July 1994
Clay (outdoors)

Japan
2

			1	2	3
1	(China) (Japan)	Chen Li-Ling; Naoko Sawamatsu	3; 6	2; 6
2	(China) (Japan)	Li Fang; Kimiko Date	7; 5	6; 1
3	(China) (Japan)	Chen Li-Ling / Li Fang; Kimiko Date / Nana Miyagi	1; 6	2; 6

=== Finland vs. Slovakia ===
Finland
1
Waldstadion T.C., Frankfurt, Germany
18 July 1993
Clay (outdoors)

Slovakia
2

			1	2	3
1	(Finland) (Slovakia)	Petra Thorén; Radka Zrubáková	2; 6	4; 6
2	(Finland) (Slovakia)	Nanne Dahlman; Karina Habšudová	2; 6	3; 6
3	(Finland) (Slovakia)	Nanne Dahlman / Petra Thorén; Janette Husárová / Katarína Studeníková	7^{7} 6^{4}	7^{7} 6^{2}

=== Germany vs. Colombia ===
Germany
3
Waldstadion T.C., Frankfurt, Germany
18 July 1994
Clay (outdoors)

Colombia
0

			1	2	3
1	(Germany) (Colombia)	Sabine Hack; Cecilia Hincapié	6; 1	6; 0
2	(Germany) (Colombia)	Anke Huber; Carmiña Giraldo	6; 0	3; 6	6; 2
3	(Germany) (Colombia)	Barbara Rittner / Christina Singer; Giana Gutiérrez / Fabiola Zuluaga	6; 0	6; 2

=== South Africa vs. Paraguay ===
South Africa
3
Waldstadion T.C., Frankfurt, Germany
18 July 1994
Clay (outdoors)

Paraguay
0

			1	2	3
1	(South Africa) (Paraguay)	Elna Reinach; Magalí Benítez	6; 3	6; 2
2	(South Africa) (Paraguay)	Joannette Kruger; Larissa Schaerer	6; 2	5; 7	6; 3
3	(South Africa) (Paraguay)	Mariaan de Swardt / Tessa Price; Magalí Benítez / Larissa Schaerer	6; 1	6; 0

=== Belarus vs. Netherlands ===
Belarus
1
Waldstadion T.C., Frankfurt, Germany
18–19 July 1994
Clay (outdoors)

Netherlands
2

			1	2	3
1	(Belarus) (Netherlands)	Tatiana Ignatieva; Miriam Oremans	6; 3	4; 6	4; 6
2	(Belarus) (Netherlands)	Natasha Zvereva; Brenda Schultz	6; 3	7; 5
3	(Belarus) (Netherlands)	Tatiana Ignatieva / Natasha Zvereva; Kristie Boogert / Miriam Oremans	6; 2	5; 7	4; 6

=== France vs. South Korea ===
France
3
Waldstadion T.C., Frankfurt, Germany
18 July 1994
Clay (outdoors)

South Korea
0

			1	2	3
1	(France) (South Korea)	Julie Halard; Choi Ju-yeon	6; 4	6; 4
2	(France) (South Korea)	Mary Pierce; Park Sung-hee	6; 3	6; 1
3	(France) (South Korea)	Alexandra Fusai / Nathalie Tauziat; Choi Ju-yeon / Park Sung-hee	6; 4	6; 4

=== Italy vs. Denmark ===
Italy
2
Waldstadion T.C., Frankfurt, Germany
19 July 1994
Clay (outdoors)

Denmark
1

			1	2	3
1	(Italy) (Denmark)	Silvia Farina; Tine Scheuer-Larsen	6; 2	6; 3
2	(Italy) (Denmark)	Sandra Cecchini; Karin Ptaszek	6; 1	7; 5
3	(Italy) (Denmark)	Rita Grande / Marzia Grossi; Sofie Albinus / Tine Scheuer-Larsen	7^{7} 6^{4}	3; 6	2; 6

=== Chinese Taipei vs. Indonesia ===
Chinese Taipei
1
Waldstadion T.C., Frankfurt, Germany
19 July 1994
Clay (outdoors)

Indonesia
2

			1	2	3
1	(Chinese Taipei) (Indonesia)	Weng Tzu-ting; Romana Tedjakusuma	6^{6} 7^{8}	1; 6
2	(Chinese Taipei) (Indonesia)	Wang Shi-ting; Yayuk Basuki	6; 4	6; 2
3	(Chinese Taipei) (Indonesia)	Jane Chi / Wang Shi-ting; Yayuk Basuki / Romana Tedjakusuma	4; 6	4; 6

=== Croatia vs. Bulgaria ===
Croatia
1
Waldstadion T.C., Frankfurt, Germany
19 July 1994
Clay (outdoors)

Bulgaria
2

			1	2	3
1	(Croatia) (Bulgaria)	Nadin Ercegović; Katerina Maleeva	6^{6} 7^{8}	1; 6
2	(Croatia) (Bulgaria)	Iva Majoli; Magdalena Maleeva	6; 4	6; 2
3	(Croatia) (Bulgaria)	Iva Majoli / Maja Murić; Katerina Maleeva / Magdalena Maleeva	4; 6	4; 6

=== United States vs. Czech Republic ===
United States
3
Waldstadion T.C., Frankfurt, Germany
19 July 1994
Clay (outdoors)

Czech Republic
0

			1	2	3
1	(United States) (Czech Republic)	Mary Joe Fernández; Petra Langrová	6; 2	6; 4
2	(United States) (Czech Republic)	Lindsay Davenport; Ludmila Richterová	6; 4	1; 6	6; 4
3	(United States) (Czech Republic)	Gigi Fernández / Zina Garrison-Jackson; Radka Bobková / Eva Martincová	6; 4	7; 5

=== Canada vs. Switzerland ===
Canada
3
Waldstadion T.C., Frankfurt, Germany
19 July 1994
Clay (outdoors)

Switzerland
0

			1	2	3
1	(Canada) (Switzerland)	Rene Simpson; Geraldine Dondit	6; 0	6; 2
2	(Canada) (Switzerland)	Patricia Hy; Emanuela Zardo	6; 3	6; 4
3	(Canada) (Switzerland)	Jill Hetherington / Rene Simpson; Manuela Schwerzmann / Miroslava Vavrinec	6; 2	7; 5

=== Austria vs. Poland ===
Austria
2
Waldstadion T.C., Frankfurt, Germany
19 July 1994
Clay (outdoors)

Poland
1

			1	2	3
1	(Austria) (Poland)	Petra Schwarz; Magdalena Feistel	6; 3	3; 6	6; 4
2	(Austria) (Poland)	Judith Wiesner; Katarzyna Nowak	6; 3	7; 5
3	(Austria) (Poland)	Petra Schwarz / Judith Wiesner; Magdalena Feistel / Katarzyna Teodorowicz-Lisowska	5; 7	6; 2	2; 6

=== Latvia vs. Australia ===
Latvia
1
Waldstadion T.C., Frankfurt, Germany
19 July 1994
Clay (outdoors)

Australia
2

			1	2	3
1	(Latvia) (Australia)	Agnese Blumberga; Rachel McQuillan	1; 6	1; 6
2	(Latvia) (Australia)	Larisa Neiland; Kristine Radford	6; 3	2; 6	6; 0
3	(Latvia) (Australia)	Agnese Blumberga / Larisa Neiland; Elizabeth Smylie / Rennae Stubbs	3; 6	3; 6

== Second round ==
=== Spain vs. Argentina ===
Spain
3
Waldstadion T.C., Frankfurt, Germany
21 July 1994
Clay (outdoors)

Argentina
0

			1	2	3
1	(Spain) (Argentina)	Conchita Martínez; Patricia Tarabini	6; 3	6^{6} 7^{8}	6; 2
2	(Spain) (Argentina)	Arantxa Sánchez Vicario; Florencia Labat	6; 1	6; 4
3	(Spain) (Argentina)	Ángeles Montolio / Virginia Ruano Pascual; Bettina Fulco / Florencia Labat	6; 1	6; 4

=== Sweden vs. Japan ===
Sweden
0
Waldstadion T.C., Frankfurt, Germany
20 July 1994
Clay (outdoors)

Japan
3

			1	2	3
1	(Sweden) (Japan)	Maria Strandlund; Naoko Sawamatsu	4; 6	3; 6
2	(Sweden) (Japan)	Åsa Carlsson; Kimiko Date	2; 6	5; 7
3	(Sweden) (Japan)	Maria Lindström / Maria Strandlund; Mana Endo / Nana Miyagi	7^{7} 6^{2}	1; 6	2; 6

=== Slovakia vs. Germany ===
Slovakia
1
Waldstadion T.C., Frankfurt, Germany
20 July 1994
Clay (outdoors)

Germany
2

			1	2	3
1	(Slovakia) (Germany)	Radka Zrubáková; Sabine Hack	2; 6	6; 4	3; 6
2	(Slovakia) (Germany)	Karina Habšudová; Anke Huber	6^{6} 7^{8}	5; 7
3	(Slovakia) (Germany)	Karina Habšudová / Janette Husárová; Barbara Rittner / Christina Singer	6; 4	6; 3

=== South Africa vs. Netherlands ===
South Africa
2
Waldstadion T.C., Frankfurt, Germany
20 July 1994
Clay (outdoors)

Netherlands
1

			1	2	3
1	(South Africa) (Netherlands)	Elna Reinach; Miriam Oremans	4; 6	5; 7
2	(South Africa) (Netherlands)	Joannette Kruger; Brenda Schultz	6; 4	6; 0
3	(South Africa) (Netherlands)	Mariaan de Swardt / Elna Reinach; Kristie Boogert / Miriam Oremans	6; 2	7; 5

=== France vs. Italy ===
France
3
Waldstadion T.C., Frankfurt, Germany
20 July 1994
Clay (outdoors)

Italy
0

			1	2	3
1	(France) (Italy)	Julie Halard; Silvia Farina	2; 6	6; 4	6; 2
2	(France) (Italy)	Mary Pierce; Sandra Cecchini	6; 0	6; 3
3	(France) (Italy)	Julie Halard / Nathalie Tauziat; Rita Grande / Marzia Grossi	6; 4	6; 1

=== Indonesia vs. Bulgaria ===
Indonesia
0
Waldstadion T.C., Frankfurt, Germany
21 July 1994
Clay (outdoors)

Bulgaria
3

			1	2	3
1	(Indonesia) (Bulgaria)	Romana Tedjakusuma; Katerina Maleeva	2; 6	1; 6
2	(Indonesia) (Bulgaria)	Yayuk Basuki; Magdalena Maleeva	3; 6	3; 6
3	(Indonesia) (Bulgaria)	Natalia Soetrisno / Romana Tedjakusuma; Lubomira Bacheva / Svetlana Krivencheva	1; 6	3; 6

=== United States vs. Canada ===
United States
3
Waldstadion T.C., Frankfurt, Germany
21 July 1994
Clay (outdoors)

Canada
0

			1	2	3
1	(United States) (Canada)	Mary Joe Fernández; Helen Kelesi	6; 1	4; 1		retired
2	(United States) (Canada)	Lindsay Davenport; Patricia Hy	6; 2	6; 4
3	(United States) (Canada)	Gigi Fernández / Zina Garrison-Jackson; Jill Hetherington / Rene Simpson	6; 1	7^{7} 6^{3}

=== Austria vs. Australia ===
Austria
2
Waldstadion T.C., Frankfurt, Germany
21 July 1994
Clay (outdoors)

Australia
1

			1	2	3
1	(Austria) (Australia)	Petra Schwarz; Rachel McQuillan	6; 4	6; 1
2	(Austria) (Australia)	Judith Wiesner; Kristine Radford	6; 0	6; 3
3	(Austria) (Australia)	Sylvia Plischke / Barbara Schett; Elizabeth Smylie / Rennae Stubbs	2; 6	3; 6

== Quarterfinals ==
=== Spain vs. Japan ===
Spain
3
Waldstadion T.C., Frankfurt, Germany
22 July 1994
Clay (outdoors)

Japan
0

			1	2	3
1	(Spain) (Japan)	Conchita Martínez; Naoko Sawamatsu	6; 3	6; 4
2	(Spain) (Japan)	Arantxa Sánchez Vicario; Kimiko Date	6; 3	2; 6	8; 6
3	(Spain) (Japan)	Ángeles Montolio / Virginia Ruano Pascual; Mana Endo / Nana Miyagi	6; 2	2; 6	6; 3

=== Germany vs. South Africa ===
Germany
3
Waldstadion T.C., Frankfurt, Germany
22 July 1994
Clay (outdoors)

South Africa
0

			1	2	3
1	(Germany) (South Africa)	Sabine Hack; Elna Reinach	6; 3	6; 4
2	(Germany) (South Africa)	Anke Huber; Joannette Kruger	6; 1	6; 2
3	(Germany) (South Africa)	Barbara Rittner / Christina Singer; Mariaan de Swardt / Tessa Price	7; 5	6; 4

=== France vs. Bulgaria ===
France
2
Waldstadion T.C., Frankfurt, Germany
22 July 1994
Clay (outdoors)

Bulgaria
1

			1	2	3
1	(France) (Bulgaria)	Julie Halard; Katerina Maleeva	6; 3	3; 6	6; 2
2	(France) (Bulgaria)	Mary Pierce; Magdalena Maleeva	7^{8} 6^{6}	4; 6	4; 6
3	(France) (Bulgaria)	Julie Halard / Nathalie Tauziat; Katerina Maleeva / Magdalena Maleeva	6; 2	3; 6	6; 2

=== United States vs. Austria ===
United States
3
Waldstadion T.C., Frankfurt, Germany
22 July 1994
Clay (outdoors)

Austria
0

			1	2	3
1	(United States) (Austria)	Mary Joe Fernández; Petra Schwarz	6; 2	6; 4
2	(United States) (Austria)	Lindsay Davenport; Judith Wiesner	2; 6	6; 2	6; 2
3	(United States) (Austria)	Gigi Fernández / Mary Joe Fernández; Sylvia Plischke / Barbara Schett	6; 4	6; 1

== Semifinals ==
=== Spain vs. Germany ===
Spain
2
Waldstadion T.C., Frankfurt, Germany
23 July 1994
Clay (outdoors)

Germany
1

			1	2	3
1	(Spain) (Germany)	Conchita Martínez; Sabine Hack	2; 6	7; 5	4; 6
2	(Spain) (Germany)	Arantxa Sánchez Vicario; Anke Huber	4; 6	6; 0	7; 5
3	(Spain) (Germany)	Conchita Martínez / Arantxa Sánchez Vicario; Barbara Rittner / Christina Singer	7; 5	6; 1

=== France vs. United States ===
France
0
Waldstadion T.C., Frankfurt, Germany
23 July 1994
Clay (outdoors)

United States
3

			1	2	3
1	(France) (United States)	Julie Halard; Mary Joe Fernández	1; 6	3; 6
2	(France) (United States)	Mary Pierce; Lindsay Davenport	7; 5	2; 6	2; 6
3	(France) (United States)	Julie Halard / Nathalie Tauziat; Gigi Fernández / Zina Garrison-Jackson	6; 3	1; 6	2; 6

== Final ==
=== Spain vs. United States ===
Spain
3
Waldstadion T.C., Frankfurt, Germany
24 July 1994
Clay (outdoors)

United States
0

			1	2	3
1	(Spain) (United States)	Conchita Martínez; Mary Joe Fernández	6; 2	6; 2
2	(Spain) (United States)	Arantxa Sánchez Vicario; Lindsay Davenport	6; 2	6; 1
3	(Spain) (United States)	Conchita Martínez / Arantxa Sánchez Vicario; Gigi Fernández / Mary Joe Fernández	6; 3	6; 4

1994 Federation Cup Champions
(Spain)
Spain
Third title
