= 1993 Federation Cup Americas Zone =

Subsection of tennis competition

The Americas Zone was one of three zones of regional Federation Cup qualifying competition in 1993. All ties were played at the Palmas del Mar in Humacao, Puerto Rico on hard courts.

The eighteen teams were divided into two pools of four and two pools of five to compete in round-robin matches. After each of the ties had been played, the teams that finished first and second in each of the respective pools would then move on to the play-off stage of the competition. The four teams that won a play-off match would go on to advance to the World Group.

== Pool Stage ==
Date: 19–23 April

	Pool A	PAR	COL	GUA	BAH
1	Paraguay (3–0)		3–0	3–0	3–0
2	Colombia (2–1)	0–3		3–0	3–0
3	Guatemala (1–2)	0–3	0–3		2–1
4	Bahamas (0–3)	0–3	0–3	1–2	

	Pool B	PER	TRI	BOL	CRC	BAR
1	Peru (4–0)		3–0	3–0	3–0	3–0
2	Trinidad and Tobago (3–1)	0–3		2–1	3–0	3–0
3	Bolivia (2–2)	0–3	1–2		2–1	2–1
4	Costa Rica (1–3)	0–3	0–3	1–2		3–0
5	Barbados (0–4)	0–3	0–3	1–2	0–3	

	Pool C	CHI	VEN	ECU	JAM	DOM
1	Chile (4–0)		2–1	2–1	3–0	3–0
2	Venezuela (3–1)	1–2		2–1	2–1	3–0
3	Ecuador (2–2)	1–2	1–2		2–1	3–0
4	Jamaica (1–3)	0–3	1–2	1–2		3–0
5	Dominican Republic (0–4)	0–3	0–3	0–3	0–3	

	Pool D	MEX	URU	ESA	PUR
1	Mexico (3–0)		2–1	3–0	3–0
2	Uruguay (2–1)	1–2		3–0	3–0
3	El Salvador (1–2)	0–3	0–3		2–1
4	Puerto Rico (0–3)	0–3	0–3	1–2	

== Play-offs ==
Date: 24 April

Winning team	Score	Losing team
Colombia	2–1	Paraguay
Peru	3–0	Venezuela
Chile	3–0	Trinidad and Tobago
Uruguay	2–1	Mexico

- Chile, Colombia, Peru and Uruguay advanced to World Group.

== See also ==
- Fed Cup structure
