= 1993 Federation Cup Americas Zone – Pool C =

Group C of the 1993 Federation Cup Americas Zone was one of four pools in the Americas zone of the 1993 Federation Cup. Five teams competed in a round robin competition, with the top two teams advancing to the play-offs.

| | (Chile) CHI | (Venezuela) VEN | (Ecuador) ECU | (Jamaica) JAM | (Dominican Republic) DOM | Match; W–L | Set; W–L | Game; W–L | Standings |
| Chile | | 2–1 | 2–1 | 3–0 | 3–0 | 4–0 | 21–6 | 146–90 | 1 |
| Venezuela | 1–2 | | 2–1 | 2–1 | 3–0 | 3–1 | 16–9 | 129–78 | 2 |
| Ecuador | 1–2 | 1–2 | | 2–1 | 3–0 | 2–2 | 14–11 | 123–109 | 3 |
| Jamaica | 0–3 | 1–2 | 1–2 | | 3–0 | 1–3 | 11–14 | 101–106 | 4 |
| Dominican Republic | 0–3 | 0–3 | 0–3 | 0–3 | | 0–4 | 0–24 | 28–144 | 5 |

== Chile vs. Dominican Republic ==
Chile
3
Palmas del Mar, Humacao, Puerto Rico
19 April 1993
Hard (outdoors)

Dominican Republic
0

| | | | 1 | 2 | 3 |
|---|---|---|---|---|---|
| 1 | (Chile) (Dominican Republic) | María-Alejandra Quezada; Rosanna Valério | 6; 1 | 6; 2 |
| 2 | (Chile) (Dominican Republic) | Paula Cabezas; Paula Álvarez | 6; 0 | 6; 0 |
| 3 | (Chile) (Dominican Republic) | Paula Cabezas / Bárbara Castro; Vivian Acra / Mónika Pimentel | 6; 4 | 6; 1 |

== Venezuela vs. Jamaica ==
Venezuela
2
Palmas del Mar, Humacao, Puerto Rico
19 April 1993
Hard (outdoors)

Jamaica
1

| | | | 1 | 2 | 3 |
|---|---|---|---|---|---|
| 1 | (Venezuela) (Jamaica) | Ninfa Marra; Sasha Hanna | 6; 1 | 6; 3 |
| 2 | (Venezuela) (Jamaica) | María Virginia Francesa; Joni Van Ryck De Groot | 6; 1 | 6; 0 |
| 3 | (Venezuela) (Jamaica) | Daniela Agostinone / Eleonora Vegliante; Sasha Hanna / Joni Van Ryck De Groot | 4; 6 | 2; 6 |

== Chile vs. Venezuela ==
Chile
2
Palmas del Mar, Humacao, Puerto Rico
20 April 1993
Hard (outdoors)

Dominican Republic
1

| | | | 1 | 2 | 3 |
|---|---|---|---|---|---|
| 1 | (Chile) (Dominican Republic) | Bárbara Castro; Ninfa Marra | 1; 6 | 2; 6 |
| 2 | (Chile) (Dominican Republic) | Paula Cabezas; María Virginia Francesa | 6; 2 | 6; 4 |
| 3 | (Chile) (Dominican Republic) | Paula Cabezas / Bárbara Castro; María Virginia Francesa / Ninfa Marra | 7^{10} 6^{8} | 6; 4 |

== Ecuador vs. Dominican Republic ==
Ecuador
3
Palmas del Mar, Humacao, Puerto Rico
20 April 1993
Hard (outdoors)

Dominican Republic
0

| | | | 1 | 2 | 3 |
|---|---|---|---|---|---|
| 1 | (Ecuador) (Dominican Republic) | Alexandra Guzmán; Mónika Pimentel | 6; 1 | 6; 1 |
| 2 | (Ecuador) (Dominican Republic) | María Dolores Campana; Paula Álvarez | 6; 0 | 6; 3 |
| 3 | (Ecuador) (Dominican Republic) | Alexandra Guzmán / Nuria Niemes; Vivian Acra / Rosanna Valério | 6; 0 | 6; 0 |

== Venezuela vs. Dominican Republic ==
Venezuela
3
Palmas del Mar, Humacao, Puerto Rico
21 April 1993
Hard (outdoors)

Dominican Republic
0

| | | | 1 | 2 | 3 |
|---|---|---|---|---|---|
| 1 | (Venezuela) (Dominican Republic) | Ninfa Marra; Mónika Pimentel | 6; 1 | 6; 1 |
| 2 | (Venezuela) (Dominican Republic) | María Virginia Francesa; Rosanna Valério | 6; 1 | 6; 0 |
| 3 | (Venezuela) (Dominican Republic) | Daniela Agostinone / Eleonora Vegliante; Vivian Acra / Paula Álvarez | 6; 4 | 6; 0 |

== Ecuador vs. Jamaica ==
Ecuador
2
Palmas del Mar, Humacao, Puerto Rico
21 April 1993
Hard (outdoors)

Jamaica
1

| | | | 1 | 2 | 3 |
|---|---|---|---|---|---|
| 1 | (Ecuador) (Jamaica) | Nuria Niemes; Sasha Hanna | 3; 6 | 1; 6 |
| 2 | (Ecuador) (Jamaica) | María Dolores Campana; Joni Van Ryck De Groot | 7^{7} 6^{5} | 6; 2 |
| 3 | (Ecuador) (Jamaica) | María Dolores Campana / Nuria Niemes; Sasha Hanna / Joni Van Ryck De Groot | 6; 2 | 6; 4 |

== Chile vs. Jamaica ==
Chile
3
Palmas del Mar, Humacao, Puerto Rico
22 April 1993
Hard (outdoors)

Jamaica
0

| | | | 1 | 2 | 3 |
|---|---|---|---|---|---|
| 1 | (Chile) (Jamaica) | María-Alejandra Quezada; Sasha Hanna | 6; 2 | 6; 4 |
| 2 | (Chile) (Jamaica) | Paula Cabezas; Joni Van Ryck De Groot | 3; 6 | 6; 3 | 6; 1 |
| 3 | (Chile) (Jamaica) | Paula Cabezas / Bárbara Castro; Sasha Hanna / Joni Van Ryck De Groot | 6; 2 | 6; 4 |

== Venezuela vs. Ecuador ==
Venezuela
2
Palmas del Mar, Humacao, Puerto Rico
22 April 1993
Hard (outdoors)

Ecuador
1

| | | | 1 | 2 | 3 |
|---|---|---|---|---|---|
| 1 | (Venezuela) (Ecuador) | Ninfa Marra; Nuria Niemes | 6; 2 | 4; 6 | 6; 2 |
| 2 | (Venezuela) (Ecuador) | María Virginia Francesa; María Dolores Campana | 1; 6 | 6^{2} 7^{7} |
| 3 | (Venezuela) (Ecuador) | Ninfa Marra / Eleonora Vegliante; María Dolores Campana / Nuria Niemes | 6; 2 | 6; 1 |

== Chile vs. Ecuador ==
Chile
2
Palmas del Mar, Humacao, Puerto Rico
23 April 1993
Hard (outdoors)

Ecuador
1

| | | | 1 | 2 | 3 |
|---|---|---|---|---|---|
| 1 | (Chile) (Ecuador) | María-Alejandra Quezada; Nuria Niemes | 6; 2 | 6; 1 |
| 2 | (Chile) (Ecuador) | Paula Cabezas; María Dolores Campana | 6^{6} 7^{8} | 6; 2 | 6; 3 |
| 3 | (Chile) (Ecuador) | Bárbara Castro / María-Alejandra Quezada; María Dolores Campana / Nuria Niemes | 7; 5 | 3; 6 | 3; 6 |

== Jamaica vs. Dominican Republic ==
Jamaica
3
Palmas del Mar, Humacao, Puerto Rico
23 April 1993
Hard (outdoors)

Dominican Republic
0

| | | | 1 | 2 | 3 |
|---|---|---|---|---|---|
| 1 | (Jamaica) (Dominican Republic) | Sasha Hanna; Vivian Acra | 6; 1 | 6; 1 |
| 2 | (Jamaica) (Dominican Republic) | Joni Van Ryck De Groot; Paula Álvarez | 6; 2 | 6; 0 |
| 3 | (Jamaica) (Dominican Republic) | Sasha Hanna / Joni Van Ryck De Groot; Mónika Pimentel / Paula Álvarez | 6; 3 | 6; 1 |

== See also ==
- Fed Cup structure
