= 1993 Federation Cup Americas Zone – Pool A =

Group A of the 1993 Federation Cup Americas Zone was one of four pools in the Americas zone of the 1993 Federation Cup. Four teams competed in a round robin competition, with the top two teams advancing to the play-offs.

	(Paraguay) PAR	(Colombia) COL	(Guatemala) GUA	(The Bahamas) BAH	RR; W–L	Set; W–L	Game; W–L	Standings
Paraguay		3–0	3–0	3–0	3–0	18–1	115–42	1
Colombia	0–3		3–0	3–0	2–1	19–6	102–59	2
Guatemala	0–3	0–3		2–1	1–2	4–16	59–107	3
Bahamas	0–3	0–3	1–2		0–3	4–16	40–108	4

== Paraguay vs. Colombia ==
Paraguay
3
Palmas del Mar, Humacao, Puerto Rico
19 April 1993
Hard (outdoors)

Colombia
0

			1	2	3
1	(Paraguay) (Colombia)	Larissa Schaerer; Carmiña Giraldo	6; 1	7; 5
2	(Paraguay) (Colombia)	Rossana de los Ríos; Cecilia Hincapié	6; 1	3; 6	7; 5
3	(Paraguay) (Colombia)	Magalí Benítez / Larissa Schaerer; Carmiña Giraldo / Giana Gutiérrez	7^{7} 6^{3}	7^{9} 6^{7}

== Guatemala vs. Bahamas ==
Guatemala
2
Palmas del Mar, Humacao, Puerto Rico
19 April 1993
Hard (outdoors)

Bahamas
1

			1	2	3
1	(Guatemala) (The Bahamas)	Alejandra Gómez; Chris-Anne Aston	3; 6	4; 6
2	(Guatemala) (The Bahamas)	Florea de María Urrea; Kim Cartwright	1; 6	7; 5	6; 1
3	(Guatemala) (The Bahamas)	Alejandra Gómez / Florea de María Urrea; Chris-Anne Aston / Kim Cartwright	3; 6	6; 4	6; 1

== Paraguay vs. Guatemala ==
Paraguay
3
Palmas del Mar, Humacao, Puerto Rico
20 April 1993
Hard (outdoors)

Guatemala
0

			1	2	3
1	(Paraguay) (Guatemala)	Larissa Schaerer; Brenda Rojas	6; 0	6; 2
2	(Paraguay) (Guatemala)	Rossana de los Ríos; Lily Aguirre	6; 2	6; 2
3	(Paraguay) (Guatemala)	Rossana de los Ríos / Larissa Schaerer; Alejandra Gómez / Florea de María Urrea	6; 2	6; 3

== Paraguay vs. Bahamas ==
Paraguay
3
Palmas del Mar, Humacao, Puerto Rico
21 April 1993
Hard (outdoors)

Bahamas
0

			1	2	3
1	(Paraguay) (The Bahamas)	Larissa Schaerer; Dyphany Wilkinson	6; 0	6; 0
2	(Paraguay) (The Bahamas)	Rossana de los Ríos; Chris-Anne Aston	6; 1	6; 0
3	(Paraguay) (The Bahamas)	Magalí Benítez / Larissa Schaerer; Kim Cartwright / Lori Feingold	6; 0	6; 0

== Colombia vs. Guatemala ==
Colombia
3
Palmas del Mar, Humacao, Puerto Rico
22 April 1993
Hard (outdoors)

Guatemala
0

			1	2	3
1	(Colombia) (Guatemala)	Carmiña Giraldo; Alejandra Gómez	6; 4	6; 3
2	(Colombia) (Guatemala)	Cecilia Hincapié; Florea de María Urrea	6; 2	6; 0
3	(Colombia) (Guatemala)	Carmiña Giraldo / Giana Gutiérrez; Alejandra Gómez / Florea de María Urrea	6; 1	6; 2

== Colombia vs. Bahamas ==
Colombia
3
Palmas del Mar, Humacao, Puerto Rico
23 April 1993
Hard (outdoors)

Bahamas
0

			1	2	3
1	(Colombia) (The Bahamas)	Giana Gutiérrez; Lori Feingold	6; 1	6; 0
2	(Colombia) (The Bahamas)	Cecilia Hincapié; Kim Cartwright	6; 1	6; 1
3	(Colombia) (The Bahamas)	Carmiña Giraldo / Cecilia Hincapié; Chris-Anne Aston / Dyphany Wilkinson	6; 1	6; 0

== See also ==
- Fed Cup structure
