= 1993 Federation Cup World Group =

Part of tennis tournament

- Date: 19-25 July
- Edition: 3rd

Champions
- Spain
- Fed Cup

The World Group was the highest level of Federation Cup competition in 1993. Thirty-two nations competed in a five-round knockout competition from 19 to 25 July. Germany was the defending champion, but they were shocked in the first round by Australia, in what was the first time in the event's history where the defending team was defeated without winning a match. The defeat was especially significant as it involved a loss for then singles World No. 1 Steffi Graf at the hands of Nicole Provis. Prior to this match, Graf had defeated Provis in straight at their four meetings, and had never lost a Fed Cup tie.

The Australian team reached the final, but they were defeated by the Spanish team, in what was their third consecutive final.

== Participating teams ==
Participating teams
Argentina	Australia	Austria	Belgium	Bulgaria	Canada	Chile	China
Colombia	Croatia	Czech Republic	Denmark	Finland	France	Germany	Great Britain
Indonesia	Israel	Italy	Japan	Latvia	Netherlands	New Zealand	Peru
Poland	South Africa	South Korea	Spain	Sweden	Switzerland	United States	Uruguay

== Draw ==
First Round; 19–20 July
Germany	1
Australia	2
Austria	1
Denmark	2
Q	Chile	0
Finland	3
Q	Colombia	0
Japan	3
Argentina	3
Q	New Zealand	0
South Korea	1
Bulgaria	2
Q	China	2
Q	Peru	1
Switzerland	0
United States	3
Czech Republic	2
South Africa	1
Italy	3
Q	Israel	0
Sweden	3
Q	Uruguay	0
Canada	1
France	2
Netherlands	3
Q	Croatia	0
Q	Latvia	2
Q	Belgium	1
Poland	1
Q	Indonesia	2
Q	Great Britain	0
Spain	3

Second Round; 21 July
Australia	3
Denmark	0
Finland	2
Japan	1
Argentina	2
Bulgaria	1
Q	China	1
United States	2
Czech Republic	2
Italy	1
Sweden	0
France	3
Netherlands	3
Q	Latvia	0
Q	Indonesia	0
Spain	3

Quarterfinals; 22–23 July
Australia	3
Finland	0
Argentina	2
United States	1
Czech Republic	0
France	3
Netherlands	0
Spain	3

Semifinals; 24 July
Australia	2
Argentina	1
France	1
Spain	2

Final; 25 July
Australia	0
Spain	3

== First round ==
=== Germany vs. Australia ===
Germany
1
Waldstadion T.C., Frankfurt, Germany
20 July 1993
Clay (outdoors)

Australia
2

			1	2	3
1	(Germany) (Australia)	Anke Huber; Elizabeth Smylie	6; 1	6; 2
2	(Germany) (Australia)	Steffi Graf; Nicole Provis	4; 6	6; 1	1; 6
3	(Germany) (Australia)	Anke Huber / Barbara Rittner; Elizabeth Smylie / Rennae Stubbs	7; 5	4; 6	3; 6

=== Austria vs. Denmark ===
Austria
1
Waldstadion T.C., Frankfurt, Germany
20 July 1993
Clay (outdoors)

Denmark
2

			1	2	3
1	(Austria) (Denmark)	Sandra Dopfer; Sofie Albinus	7; 5	2; 6	4; 6
2	(Austria) (Denmark)	Judith Wiesner; Karin Ptaszek	6; 2	6; 2
3	(Austria) (Denmark)	Petra Schwarz / Judith Wiesner; Karin Ptaszek / Tine Scheuer-Larsen	3; 6	6^{2} 7^{7}

=== Chile vs. Finland ===
Chile
0
Waldstadion T.C., Frankfurt, Germany
20 July 1993
Clay (outdoors)

Finland
3

			1	2	3
1	(Chile) (Finland)	Bárbara Castro; Petra Thorén	1; 6	2; 6
2	(Chile) (Finland)	Paula Cabezas; Nanne Dahlman	0; 6	2; 6
3	(Chile) (Finland)	Paula Cabezas / Bárbara Castro; Nanne Dahlman / Petra Thorén	3; 6	1; 6

=== Colombia vs. Japan ===
Colombia
0
Waldstadion T.C., Frankfurt, Germany
20 July 1993
Clay (outdoors)

Japan
3

			1	2	3
1	(Colombia) (Japan)	Carmiña Giraldo; Mana Endo	6; 2	0; 6	0; 6
2	(Colombia) (Japan)	Cecilia Hincapié; Naoko Sawamatsu	1; 6	2; 6
3	(Colombia) (Japan)	Carmiña Giraldo / Cecilia Hincapié; Rika Hiraki / Nana Miyagi	5; 7	4; 6

=== Argentina vs. New Zealand ===
Argentina
3
Waldstadion T.C., Frankfurt, Germany
19 July 1993
Clay (outdoors)

New Zealand
0

			1	2	3
1	(Argentina) (New Zealand)	Inés Gorrochategui; Claudine Toleafoa	6; 2	6; 2
2	(Argentina) (New Zealand)	Florencia Labat; Julie Richardson	6; 2	6; 4
3	(Argentina) (New Zealand)	Inés Gorrochategui / Patricia Tarabini; Julie Richardson / Claudine Toleafoa	6; 3	6; 3

=== South Korea vs. Bulgaria ===
South Korea
1
Waldstadion T.C., Frankfurt, Germany
19 July 1993
Clay (outdoors)

Bulgaria
2

			1	2	3
1	(South Korea) (Bulgaria)	Kim Yeon-sook; Katerina Maleeva	0; 6	2; 6
2	(South Korea) (Bulgaria)	Park Sung-hee; Magdalena Maleeva	0; 6	4; 6
3	(South Korea) (Bulgaria)	Kim Il-soon / Park Sung-hee; Lubomira Bacheva / Katerina Maleeva	3; 6	7^{7} 6^{2}	4; 1	retired

=== China vs. Peru ===
China
2
Waldstadion T.C., Frankfurt, Germany
20 July 1993
Clay (outdoors)

Peru
1

			1	2	3
1	(China) (Peru)	Bi Ying; Pilar Vásquez	6; 1	6; 4
2	(China) (Peru)	Li Fang; Laura Gildemeister	6; 4	4; 6	4; 6
3	(China) (Peru)	Bi Ying / Li Fang; Laura Gildemeister / Pilar Vásquez	6; 4	6; 0

=== Switzerland vs. United States ===
Switzerland
0
Waldstadion T.C., Frankfurt, Germany
20 July 1993
Clay (outdoors)

United States
3

			1	2	3
1	(Switzerland) (United States)	Christelle Fauche; Lindsay Davenport	4; 6	3; 6
2	(Switzerland) (United States)	Emanuela Zardo; Lori McNeil	6; 1	3; 6	3; 6
3	(Switzerland) (United States)	Joana Manta / Emanuela Zardo; Debbie Graham / Ann Wunderlich	3; 6	1; 6

=== Czech Republic vs. South Africa ===
Czech Republic
2
Waldstadion T.C., Frankfurt, Germany
19 July 1993
Clay (outdoors)

South Africa
1

			1	2	3
1	(Czech Republic) (South Africa)	Helena Suková; Rosalyn Nideffer	6; 4	3; 6	6; 4
2	(Czech Republic) (South Africa)	Jana Novotná; Amanda Coetzer	6; 1	6; 4
3	(Czech Republic) (South Africa)	Andrea Strnadová / Radka Zrubáková; Amanda Coetzer / Elna Reinach	5; 7	4; 6

=== Italy vs. Israel ===
Italy
3
Waldstadion T.C., Frankfurt, Germany
19 July 1993
Clay (outdoors)

Israel
0

			1	2	3
1	(Italy) (Israel)	Linda Ferrando; Anna Smashnova	7; 5	6; 1
2	(Italy) (Israel)	Sandra Cecchini; Yael Segal	6; 1	6; 4
3	(Italy) (Israel)	Silvia Farina / Linda Ferrando; Yael Segal / Limor Zaltz	6; 1	6; 2

=== Sweden vs. Uruguay ===
Sweden
3
Waldstadion T.C., Frankfurt, Germany
19 July 1993
Clay (outdoors)

Uruguay
0

			1	2	3
1	(Sweden) (Uruguay)	Åsa Carlsson; Laura Olave	6; 1	7; 5
2	(Sweden) (Uruguay)	Cecilia Dahlman; Claudia Brause	6; 4	6; 1
3	(Sweden) (Uruguay)	Maria Lindström / Maria Strandlund; Claudia Brause / Patricia Miller	6; 4	6; 3

=== Canada vs. France ===
Canada
1
Waldstadion T.C., Frankfurt, Germany
19 July 1993
Clay (outdoors)

France
2

			1	2	3
1	(Canada) (France)	Helen Kelesi; Julie Halard	6; 2	7; 5
2	(Canada) (France)	Patricia Hy; Nathalie Tauziat	4; 6	1; 6
3	(Canada) (France)	Jill Hetherington / Patricia Hy; Julie Halard / Nathalie Tauziat	5; 7	6^{1} 7^{7}

=== Netherlands vs. Croatia ===
Netherlands
3
Waldstadion T.C., Frankfurt, Germany
20 July 1993
Clay (outdoors)

Croatia
0

			1	2	3
1	(Netherlands) (Croatia)	Stephanie Rottier; Maja Murić	6; 2	6; 0
2	(Netherlands) (Croatia)	Miriam Oremans; Nadin Ercegović	6; 1	6; 1
3	(Netherlands) (Croatia)	Kristie Boogert / Miriam Oremans; Maja Murić / Silvija Talaja	6; 3	6; 0

=== Latvia vs. Belgium ===
Latvia
2
Waldstadion T.C., Frankfurt, Germany
20 July 1993
Clay (outdoors)

Belgium
1

			1	2	3
1	(Latvia) (Belgium)	Agnese Blumberga; Nancy Feber	6; 3	6; 3
2	(Latvia) (Belgium)	Larisa Neiland; Dominique Monami	1; 6	7; 5	1; 6
3	(Latvia) (Belgium)	Agnese Blumberga / Larisa Neiland; Laurence Courtois / Dominique Monami	4; 6	6; 4	9; 7

=== Poland vs. Indonesia ===
Poland
1
Waldstadion T.C., Frankfurt, Germany
19 July 1993
Clay (outdoors)

Indonesia
2

			1	2	3
1	(Poland) (Indonesia)	Katarzyna Teodorowicz-Lisowska; Romana Tedjakusuma	3; 6	2; 6
2	(Poland) (Indonesia)	Katarzyna Nowak; Yayuk Basuki	6; 3	2; 6	6; 3
3	(Poland) (Indonesia)	Magdalena Feistel / Katarzyna Teodorowicz-Lisowska; Yayuk Basuki / Romana Tedjakusuma	4; 6	1; 6

=== Great Britain vs. Spain ===
Great Britain
0
Waldstadion T.C., Frankfurt, Germany
20 July 1993
Clay (outdoors)

Spain
3

			1	2	3
1	(United Kingdom) (Spain)	Jo Durie; Conchita Martínez	2; 6	1; 6
2	(United Kingdom) (Spain)	Clare Wood; Arantxa Sánchez Vicario	3; 6	0; 6
3	(United Kingdom) (Spain)	Jo Durie / Clare Wood; Conchita Martínez / Arantxa Sánchez Vicario	1; 6	6; 4	1; 6

== Second round ==
=== Australia vs. Denmark ===
Australia
3
Waldstadion T.C., Frankfurt, Germany
21 July 1993
Clay (outdoors)

Denmark
0

			1	2	3
1	(Australia) (Denmark)	Michelle Jaggard-Lai; Sofie Albinus	6; 1	1; 6	6; 1
2	(Australia) (Denmark)	Nicole Provis; Karin Ptaszek	7^{7} 6^{5}	7; 5
3	(Australia) (Denmark)	Elizabeth Smylie / Rennae Stubbs; Karin Ptaszek / Tine Scheuer-Larsen	6; 0	6; 1

=== Finland vs. Japan ===
Finland
2
Waldstadion T.C., Frankfurt, Germany
21 July 1993
Clay (outdoors)

Japan
1

			1	2	3
1	(Finland) (Japan)	Petra Thorén; Mana Endo	3; 6	2; 6
2	(Finland) (Japan)	Nanne Dahlman; Naoko Sawamatsu	6; 2	6; 3
3	(Finland) (Japan)	Nanne Dahlman / Petra Thorén; Rika Hiraki / Nana Miyagi	6; 4	5; 7	6; 3

=== Argentina vs. Bulgaria ===
Argentina
2
Waldstadion T.C., Frankfurt, Germany
21 July 1993
Clay (outdoors)

Bulgaria
1

			1	2	3
1	(Argentina) (Bulgaria)	Inés Gorrochategui; Katerina Maleeva	6; 1	7; 5
2	(Argentina) (Bulgaria)	Florencia Labat; Magdalena Maleeva	4; 6	7; 5	3; 6
3	(Argentina) (Bulgaria)	Inés Gorrochategui / Patricia Tarabini; Katerina Maleeva / Magdalena Maleeva	5; 7	6; 4	6; 2

=== China vs. United States ===
China
1
Waldstadion T.C., Frankfurt, Germany
21 July 1993
Clay (outdoors)

United States
2

			1	2	3
1	(China) (United States)	Bi Ying; Lindsay Davenport	1; 6	3; 6
2	(China) (United States)	Li Fang; Lori McNeil	2; 6	7^{8} 6^{6}	6; 0
3	(China) (United States)	Chen Li-Ling / Li Fang; Lindsay Davenport / Lori McNeil	3; 6	0; 6

=== Czech Republic vs. Italy ===
Czech Republic
2
Waldstadion T.C., Frankfurt, Germany
21 July 1993
Clay (outdoors)

Italy
1

			1	2	3
1	(Czech Republic) (Italy)	Helena Suková; Maria-Francesca Bentivoglio	6; 4	6; 2
2	(Czech Republic) (Italy)	Jana Novotná; Sandra Cecchini	6; 0	2; 6	3; 6
3	(Czech Republic) (Italy)	Jana Novotná / Helena Suková; Sandra Cecchini / Silvia Farina	6; 2	6; 2

=== Sweden vs. France ===
Sweden
0
Waldstadion T.C., Frankfurt, Germany
21 July 1993
Clay (outdoors)

France
3

			1	2	3
1	(Sweden) (France)	Åsa Carlsson; Julie Halard	2; 6	3; 6
2	(Sweden) (France)	Cecilia Dahlman; Nathalie Tauziat	1; 6	6^{5} 7^{7}
3	(Sweden) (France)	Maria Lindström / Maria Strandlund; Julie Halard / Nathalie Tauziat	2; 6	3; 6

=== Netherlands vs. Latvia ===
Netherlands
3
Waldstadion T.C., Frankfurt, Germany
21 July 1993
Clay (outdoors)

Latvia
0

			1	2	3
1	(Netherlands) (Latvia)	Stephanie Rottier; Oksana Bushevitsa	6; 4	6; 2
2	(Netherlands) (Latvia)	Miriam Oremans; Agnese Blumberga	7^{7} 6^{4}	6; 4
3	(Netherlands) (Latvia)	Kristie Boogert / Miriam Oremans; Agnese Blumberga / Oksana Bushevitsa	6; 2	6; 3

=== Indonesia vs. Spain ===
Indonesia
0
Waldstadion T.C., Frankfurt, Germany
21 July 1993
Clay (outdoors)

Spain
3

			1	2	3
1	(Indonesia) (Spain)	Romana Tedjakusuma; Conchita Martínez	1; 6	1; 6
2	(Indonesia) (Spain)	Yayuk Basuki; Arantxa Sánchez Vicario	1; 6	2; 6
3	(Indonesia) (Spain)	Romana Tedjakusuma / Suzanna Anggarkusuma; Virginia Ruano Pascual / Cristina Torrens Valero	6^{3} 7^{7}	6; 4	3; 6

== Quarterfinals ==
=== Australia vs. Finland ===
Australia
3
Waldstadion T.C., Frankfurt, Germany
22 July 1993
Clay (outdoors)

Finland
0

			1	2	3
1	(Australia) (Finland)	Michelle Jaggard-Lai; Petra Thorén	6; 3	6; 4
2	(Australia) (Finland)	Nicole Provis; Nanne Dahlman	6; 1	6; 2
3	(Australia) (Finland)	Elizabeth Smylie / Rennae Stubbs; Linda Jansson / Katrina Saarinen	6; 4	6; 0

=== Argentina vs. United States ===
Argentina
2
Waldstadion T.C., Frankfurt, Germany
22 July 1993
Clay (outdoors)

United States
1

			1	2	3
1	(Argentina) (United States)	Inés Gorrochategui; Lindsay Davenport	6^{5} 7^{7}	7; 5	7; 5
2	(Argentina) (United States)	Florencia Labat; Lori McNeil	5; 7	6; 3	6; 0
3	(Argentina) (United States)	Inés Gorrochategui / Patricia Tarabini; Debbie Graham / Ann Wunderlich	3; 6	0; 3		retired

=== Czech Republic vs. France ===
Czech Republic
0
Waldstadion T.C., Frankfurt, Germany
23 July 1993
Clay (outdoors)

France
3

			1	2	3
1	(Czech Republic) (France)	Helena Suková; Julie Halard	6^{3} 7^{7}	4; 6
2	(Czech Republic) (France)	Jana Novotná; Nathalie Tauziat	1; 6	6; 0	3; 6
3	(Czech Republic) (France)	Andrea Strnadová / Radka Zrubáková; Isabelle Demongeot / Pascale Paradis-Mangon	4; 6	6; 3	3; 6

=== Netherlands vs. Spain ===
Netherlands
0
Waldstadion T.C., Frankfurt, Germany
23 July 1993
Clay (outdoors)

Spain
3

			1	2	3
1	(Netherlands) (Spain)	Stephanie Rottier; Conchita Martínez	6^{3} 7^{7}	3; 6
2	(Netherlands) (Spain)	Miriam Oremans; Arantxa Sánchez Vicario	6^{4} 7^{7}	0; 6
3	(Netherlands) (Spain)	Manon Bollegraf / Kristie Boogert; Virginia Ruano Pascual / Cristina Torrens Valero	7^{8} 6^{6}	6^{4} 7^{7}	4; 6

== Semifinals ==
=== Australia vs. Argentina ===
Australia
2
Waldstadion T.C., Frankfurt, Germany
24 July 1993
Clay (outdoors)

Argentina
1

			1	2	3
1	(Australia) (Argentina)	Michelle Jaggard-Lai; Inés Gorrochategui	4; 6	2; 6
2	(Australia) (Argentina)	Nicole Provis; Florencia Labat	1; 6	6; 2	6; 3
3	(Australia) (Argentina)	Elizabeth Smylie / Rennae Stubbs; Inés Gorrochategui / Patricia Tarabini	4; 6	6; 2	6; 3

=== France vs. Spain ===
France
1
Waldstadion T.C., Frankfurt, Germany
24 July 1993
Clay (outdoors)

Spain
2

			1	2	3
1	(France) (Spain)	Julie Halard; Conchita Martínez	1; 6	6; 3	3; 6
2	(France) (Spain)	Nathalie Tauziat; Arantxa Sánchez Vicario	1; 6	4; 6
3	(France) (Spain)	Isabelle Demongeot / Pascale Paradis-Mangon; Virginia Ruano Pascual / Cristina Torrens Valero	2; 1			retired

== Final ==
=== Australia vs. Spain ===
Australia
0
Waldstadion T.C., Frankfurt, Germany
25 July 1993
Clay (outdoors)

Spain
3

			1	2	3
1	(Australia) (Spain)	Michelle Jaggard-Lai; Conchita Martínez	0; 6	2; 6
2	(Australia) (Spain)	Nicole Provis; Arantxa Sánchez Vicario	2; 6	3; 6
3	(Australia) (Spain)	Elizabeth Smylie / Rennae Stubbs; Conchita Martínez / Arantxa Sánchez Vicario	6; 3	1; 6	3; 6

1993 Federation Cup Champions
(Spain)
Spain
Second title
