= List of Colombia Fed Cup team representatives =

This is a list of tennis players who have represented the Colombia Fed Cup team in an official Billie Jean King Cup match. Colombia have taken part in the competition since 1972.

== Players ==
| Player | W-L (Total) | W-L (Singles) | W-L (Doubles) | Ties | Debut |
|---|---|---|---|---|---|
| Emiliana Arango | 11 – 8 | 9 – 6 | 2 – 2 | 16 | 2016 |
| Catalina Castaño | 51 – 23 | 33 – 17 | 18 – 6 | 50 | 1996 |
| Karen Castiblanco | 12 – 10 | 1 – 6 | 11 – 4 | 19 | 2004 |
| Maria-Victoria De Moggio | 5 – 6 | 2 – 4 | 3 – 2 | 6 | 1972 |
| Mariana Duque Mariño | 42 – 22 | 26 – 17 | 16 – 5 | 45 | 2005 |
| Carolina Escamilla | 0 – 1 | - | 0 – 1 | 1 | 2003 |
| Gloria Escobar | 0 – 2 | 0 – 1 | 0 – 1 | 2 | 1984 |
| Romy Farah | 2 – 7 | 1 – 4 | 1 – 3 | 8 | 2000 |
| Liliana Fernández | 1 – 4 | 1 – 1 | 0 – 3 | 3 | 1984 |
| Isabel Fernández de Soto | 8 – 3 | 5 – 1 | 3 – 2 | 6 | 1972 |
| Andrea Giraldo | 2 – 3 | 1 – 2 | 1 – 1 | 3 | 2004 |
| Carmiña Giraldo | 20 – 16 | 10 – 11 | 10 – 5 | 23 | 1992 |
| Giana Gutiérrez | 4 – 6 | 2 – 2 | 2 – 4 | 7 | 1992 |
| María Herazo González | 12 – 15 | 6 – 8 | 6 – 7 | 23 | 2014 |
| Cecilia Hincapié | 8 – 5 | 4 – 3 | 4 – 2 | 9 | 1993 |
| Yuliana Lizarazo | 14 – 14 | 5 – 6 | 9 – 8 | 23 | 2008 |
| Carolina Mayorga | 3 – 1 | - | 3 – 1 | 4 | 2001 |
| Gabriela Mejia-Tenorio | 1 – 1 | 0 – 1 | 1 – 0 | 3 | 2004 |
| Mariana Mesa | 7 – 9 | 1 – 3 | 6 – 6 | 12 | 1995 |
| Alexandra Moreno-Kaste | 0 – 1 | - | 0 – 1 | 1 | 2008 |
| Viky Núñez Fuentes | 10 – 4 | 3 – 2 | 7 – 2 | 11 | 2006 |
| Camila Osorio | 14 – 8 | 11 – 4 | 3 – 4 | 14 | 2016 |
| María Paulina Pérez | 6 – 12 | 0 – 3 | 6 – 9 | 17 | 2015 |
| Paula Andrea Pérez | 1 – 0 | - | 1 – 0 | 1 | 2014 |
| Catalina Ramirez | 1 – 1 | 1 – 1 | - | 2 | 1992 |
| Paula-Catalina Robles-García | 0 – 1 | 0 – 1 | - | 1 | 2006 |
| Elsa Rodríguez | 2 – 3 | 2 – 1 | 0 – 2 | 3 | 1984 |
| Ximena Rodríguez | 3 – 2 | - | 3 – 2 | 5 | 1996 |
| Carolina Torres | 2 – 3 | 0 – 2 | 2 – 1 | 4 | 1992 |
| Laura Ucrós | 1 – 1 | 0 – 1 | 1 – 0 | 2 | 2013 |
| Juliana Valero | 1 – 1 | 0 – 1 | 1 – 0 | 2 | 2018 |
| Paula Zabala | 1 – 0 | - | 1 – 0 | 1 | 2010 |
| Fabiola Zuluaga | 42 – 16 | 27 – 7 | 15 – 9 | 34 | 1994 |
