= Cornelia Grünes =

German tennis player

- Country (sports): East Germany; Germany
- Born: 10 November 1969 (age 56)
- Prize money: $23,766

Singles
- Career record: 73–79
- Career titles: 2 ITF
- Highest ranking: No. 336 (13 July 1992)

Doubles
- Career record: 31–47
- Career titles: 1 ITF
- Highest ranking: No. 403 (17 June 1996)

Cornelia Grünes (born November 10, 1969) is a German former tennis player.

== Career ==
Grünes began playing tennis at the age of twelve in East Berlin at the SG Friedrichshagen. She initially played in the club for only three months and then trained according to the practice schedules set up by her father. In 1983, she won her first tournament in Dresden. In 1985 and 1986, Grünes became the youth champion of East Germany, and in 1986 she also became the East German champion in adult mixed doubles. Due to an application for emigration filed by her family in August 1986, Grünes was subsequently no longer allowed to compete in championships, but continued to compete in tournaments.

Grünes played her first match after moving to West Germany in Mainz in 1988 in the elimination round for the German championship. She lived briefly in Bürstadt in Hesse and then in West Berlin. There, the 1.70 meter tall left-hander became a member of the LTTC "Rot-Weiß" club. Grünes later competed for the club Grün-Gold Tempelhof.

In the professional field, Grünes participated in numerous tournaments in different countries between 1989 and 1999. Her highest ranking in the world was 336th in singles (July 1992) and 403rd in doubles (June 1996). In singles she won ITF tournaments in Santo Domingo in November 1991 and in Curaçao in November 1995, and reached the finals in ITF tournaments in Jersey (September 1994), Kugayama, Japan (September 1997), and Toruń, Poland (August 1998).

Grünes moved to the United States and began studying business at Barry University in Florida. As a collegiate tennis player, Grünes earned All-American honors in 2003. While continuing her studies at the University at Albany, Grünes served as a coach there, coaching the women's collegiate team in 2005–06. Grünes later became employed by a Florida-based company that consults with individuals in sports and business, among others.

== ITF tournament titles ==
=== Singles ===
No.	Date	Tournament	Category	Surface	Final opponent	Result
1.	November 1991	Santo Domingo	ITF $10,000	Sand	(Venezuela) Ninfa Marra	6:3, 6:2
2.	November 1995	Curaçao	ITF $10,000	Hard court	(United States) Callie Creighton	6:4, 4:6, 6:2

=== Doubles ===
No.	Date	Tournament	Category	Surface	Partner	Final opponents	Result
1.	November 1995	Curaçao	ITF $10,000	Hard court	(Mexico) Jessica Fernández	(Colombia) Giana Gutiérrez (Germany) Nina Nittinger	6:2, 6:1
