= María Fernanda Landa =

Argentine tennis player

- Country (sports): Argentina
- Born: 29 July 1975 (age 49)
- Prize money: $105,874

Singles
- Career record: 184–143
- Career titles: 6 ITF
- Highest ranking: No. 183 (5 August 1996)

Doubles
- Career record: 151–103
- Career titles: 14 ITF
- Highest ranking: No. 108 (24 May 1999)

Grand Slam doubles results
- Wimbledon: 1R (1999)
- US Open: 1R (1996)

María Fernanda Landa (born 29 July 1975) is a former professional tennis player from Argentina.

== Biography ==
Landa competed on the WTA Tour from 1995 and made all of her main-draw appearances in the doubles format, in which she reached 108 in the world. As a singles player, she won six ITF titles, with a best ranking of 183.

She qualified for the main draw of the women's doubles at the 1996 US Open with Marlene Weingärtner and with the same partner was runner-up at the 1999 WTA Madrid Open.

At the 1999 Wimbledon Championships, Landa and Weingärtner received direct entry and were beaten in the first round by eventual champions Lindsay Davenport and Corina Morariu. She also competed in the mixed-doubles draw at Wimbledon that year with Diego del Río.

She now runs a tennis school in Tigre, Buenos Aires.

== WTA Tour finals ==
=== Doubles: 1 (runner-up) ===
Result	Date	Tournament	Tier	Surface	Partner	Opponents	Score
Loss	May 1999	Madrid Open, Spain	Tier III	Clay	(Germany) Marlene Weingärtner	(Spain) Virginia Ruano Pascual (Argentina) Paola Suárez	2–6, 6–0, 0–6

== ITF Circuit finals ==
=== Singles: 15 (6–9) ===
$25,000 tournaments
$10,000 tournaments

Result	No.	Date	Tournament	Surface	Opponent	Score
Loss	1.	23 November 1992	ITF Buenos Aires, Argentina	Clay	(Belgium) Vicky Maes	4–6, 5–7
Loss	2.	26 April 1993	ITF Santiago, Chile	Clay	(Argentina) Laura Montalvo	4–6, 6–2, 3–6
Loss	3.	24 May 1993	ITF Barcelona, Spain	Clay	(Poland) Katarzyna Teodorowicz	6–0, 3–6, 5–7
Win	4.	11 April 1994	ITF Supetar, Croatia	Clay	(Poland) Aleksandra Olsza	7–5, 4–6, 6–4
Win	5.	5 September 1994	ITF Medellín, Colombia	Clay	(Bolivia) Cecilia Ampuero	3–6, 6–3, 6–3
Loss	6.	25 September 1994	ITF Guayaquil, Ecuador	Clay	(Brazil) Miriam D'Agostini	2–6, 7–5, 0–1 ret.
Win	7.	10 October 1994	ITF Santiago, Chile	Clay	(Argentina) Pamela Zingman	6–2, 6–3
Loss	8.	14 November 1994	ITF Buenos Aires, Argentina	Clay	(Argentina) Laura Montalvo	2–6, 2–6
Win	9.	14 August 1995	ITF Carthage, Tunisia	Clay	(Netherlands) Petra Kamstra	2–3 ret.
Win	10.	27 May 1996	ITF Buenos Aires, Argentina	Clay	(Argentina) Cintia Tortorella	6–2, 6–2
Loss	11.	22 July 1996	ITF Buenos Aires, Argentina	Clay	(Argentina) Mariana Díaz Oliva	3–6, 6–7^{(5–7)}
Loss	12.	24 August 1997	ITF Kyiv, Ukraine	Clay	(Austria) Barbara Schwartz	3–6, 2–6
Win	13.	29 September 1997	ITF Buenos Aires, Argentina	Clay	(Argentina) Bettina Fulco	6–4, 6–1
Loss	14.	29 March 1999	ITF Santiago, Chile	Clay	(Colombia) Catalina Castaño	4–6, 2–6
Loss	15.	4 July 1999	ITF Mont-de-Marsan, France	Clay	(Spain) Lourdes Domínguez Lino	3–6, 4–6

=== Doubles: 27 (14–13) ===
Result	No.	Date	Tournament	Surface	Partner	Opponents	Score
Loss	1.	21 September 1992	ITF Guayaquil, Ecuador	Clay	(Argentina) Florencia Cianfagna	(Venezuela) Ninfa Marra (Brazil) Sumara Passos	1–6, 6–7
Loss	2.	19 October 1992	ITF Buenos Aires, Argentina	Clay	(Argentina) Florencia Cianfagna	(Argentina) Laura Montalvo (Argentina) Mariana Randrup	3–6, 6–3, 3–6
Loss	3.	3 May 1993	ITF Buenos Aires, Argentina	Clay	(Argentina) Mariana Randrup	(Argentina) Laura Montalvo (Argentina) Maria Inés Araiz	1–6, 6–3, 2–6
Loss	4.	10 May 1993	ITF Barcelona, Spain	Clay	(Spain) Ana Salas Lozano	(Spain) Conchita Martínez Granados (Germany) Claudia Timm	5–7, 6–1, 2–6
Win	5.	17 May 1993	ITF Tortosa, Spain	Clay	(Argentina) Maria Inés Araiz	(Israel) Tzipora Obziler (Israel) Limor Zaltz	4–6, 6–3, 6–4
Win	6.	12 July 1993	ITF Vigo, Spain	Clay	(Portugal) Sofia Prazeres	(Netherlands) Petra Kamstra (Netherlands) Linda Niemantsverdriet	7–6^{(6)}, 3–6, 7–6^{(5)}
Win	7.	19 July 1993	ITF Bilbao, Spain	Clay	(Portugal) Sofia Prazeres	(Spain) Silvia Ramón-Cortés (Spain) Inmaculada Varas	6–4, 6–4
Win	8.	11 April 1994	ITF Supetar, Croatia	Clay	(Argentina) Laura Montalvo	(Bulgaria) Teodora Nedeva (Bulgaria) Antoaneta Pandjerova	6–4, 6–2
Loss	9.	12 September 1994	ITF Manizales, Colombia	Clay	(Ecuador) María Dolores Campana	(Argentina) Guadalupe Bugallo (Brazil) Vanessa Menga	6–2, 4–6, 5–7
Win	10.	10 October 1994	ITF Santiago, Chile	Clay	(Argentina) Mariana Eberle	(Chile) Bárbara Castro (Chile) María-Alejandra Quezada	6–3, 4–6, 7–5
Win	11.	17 October 1994	ITF Asuncion, Paraguay	Clay	(Argentina) Mariana Eberle	(Peru) Carla Rodriguez (Peru) Lorena Rodriguez	6–3, 6–0
Win	12.	17 June 1995	ITF Getxo, Spain	Clay	(Poland) Magdalena Grzybowska	(Netherlands) Maaike Koutstaal (Netherlands) Seda Noorlander	6–2, 6–4
Win	13.	14 August 1995	ITF Carthage, Tunisia	Clay	(Spain) Yolanda Clemot	(Ukraine) Talina Beiko (Bulgaria) Teodora Nedeva	6–3, 6–2
Loss	14.	20 May 1996	ITF Buenos Aires, Argentina	Clay	(Argentina) Cintia Tortorella	(Argentina) Mariana Faustinelli (Argentina) Lorena Martinez	2–6, 5–7
Loss	15.	28 July 1996	ITF Buenos Aires, Argentina	Clay	(Paraguay) Larissa Schaerer	(Germany) Kirstin Freye (Germany) Caroline Schneider	6–7^{(4–7)}, 4–6
Win	16.	6 October 1996	ITF Puerto Vallarta, Mexico	Hard	(Germany) Marlene Weingärtner	(Chile) Paula Cabezas (Argentina) Veronica Stele	4–6, 7–5, 6–3
Loss	17.	23 June 1997	ITF Bordeaux, France	Clay	(Germany) Marlene Weingärtner	(France) Caroline Dhenin (Georgia (country)) Nino Louarsabishvili	7–6^{(8–6)}, 4–6, 5–7
Loss	18.	30 June 1997	ITF Stuttgart, Germany	Clay	(Germany) Marlene Weingärtner	(Netherlands) Seda Noorlander (India) Nirupama Vaidyanathan	3–6, 1–6
Loss	19.	13 July 1997	ITF Puchheim, Germany	Clay	(Netherlands) Seda Noorlander	(Germany) Kirstin Freye (France) Noëlle van Lottum	1–6, 2–6
Win	20.	4 October 1998	ITF Caracas, Venezuela	Hard	(Netherlands) Seda Noorlander	(South Africa) Nannie de Villiers (Slovakia) Janette Husárová	6–4, 5–7, 7–6
Loss	21.	19 October 1998	ITF Montevideo, Uruguay	Clay	(Spain) Eva Bes	(Argentina) Laura Montalvo (Argentina) Paola Suarez	2–6, 2–6
Win	22.	2 November 1998	ITF Mogi das Cruzes, Brazil	Clay	(Spain) Eva Bes	(Argentina) Luciana Masante (Spain) Alicia Ortuño	4–6, 6–2, 6–2
Loss	23.	16 November 1998	ITF Buenos Aires, Argentina	Clay	(Spain) Eva Bes	(Netherlands) Seda Noorlander (Slovenia) Katarina Srebotnik	6–7^{(5–7)}, 3–6
Loss	24.	7 February 1999	ITF Mallorca, Spain	Clay	(Spain) Alice Canepa	(Spain) Rosa María Andrés Rodríguez (Spain) Lourdes Domínguez Lino	1–6, 1–6
Win	25.	14 February 1999	ITF Mallorca, Spain	Clay	(Spain) Ángeles Montolio	(France) Emmanuelle Curutchet (Republic of Ireland) Kelly Liggan	2–6, 6–4, 7–6
Win	26.	4 July 1999	ITF Mont-de-Marsan, France	Clay	(Spain) Eva Bes	(Colombia) Giana Gutiérrez (Argentina) Romina Ottoboni	6–4, 6–4
Win	27.	23 April 2000	ITF San Luis Potosí, Mexico	Clay	(Argentina) Romina Ottoboni	(United Kingdom) Helen Crook (United Kingdom) Victoria Davies	6–4, 7–6^{(7)}
