= 1993 Federation Cup Americas Zone – Pool B =

Group B of the 1993 Federation Cup Americas Zone was one of four pools in the Americas zone of the 1993 Federation Cup. Five teams competed in a round robin competition, with the top two teams advancing to the play-offs.

	(Peru) PER	(Trinidad and Tobago) TRI	(Bolivia) BOL	(Costa Rica) CRC	(Barbados) BAR	Match; W–L	Set; W–L	Game; W–L	Standings
Peru		3–0	3–0	3–0	3–0	4–0	24–0	144–41	1
Trinidad and Tobago	0–3		2–1	3–0	3–0	3–1	17–10	132–103	2
Bolivia	0–3	1–2		2–1	2–1	2–2	14–14	101–120	3
Costa Rica	0–3	0–3	1–2		3–0	1–3	10–16	104–124	4
Barbados	0–3	0–3	1–2	0–3		0–4	2–23	52–145	5

== Peru vs. Barbados ==
Peru
3
Palmas del Mar, Humacao, Puerto Rico
19 April 1993
Hard (outdoors)

Barbados
0

			1	2	3
1	(Peru) (Barbados)	Pilar Vásquez; Gillian Carter	6; 0	6; 1
2	(Peru) (Barbados)	Laura Gildemeister; Amanda Browne	6; 1	6; 3
3	(Peru) (Barbados)	Laura Gildemeister / Pilar Vásquez; Amanda Browne / Jennifer Carter	6; 1	6; 2

== Bolivia vs. Costa Rica ==
Bolivia
2
Palmas del Mar, Humacao, Puerto Rico
19 April 1993
Hard (outdoors)

Costa Rica
1

			1	2	3
1	(Bolivia) (Costa Rica)	Sandra Kellemberger; Paula Umaña	1; 6	6; 2	6; 1
2	(Bolivia) (Costa Rica)	Natasha Villarroel; Karla Golfin	6; 4	6; 3
3	(Bolivia) (Costa Rica)	Paola Céspedes / Sandra Kellemberger; Karla Golfin / Paula Umaña	2; 6	1; 6

== Peru vs. Costa Rica ==
Peru
3
Palmas del Mar, Humacao, Puerto Rico
20 April 1993
Hard (outdoors)

Costa Rica
0

			1	2	3
1	(Peru) (Costa Rica)	Pilar Vásquez; Melissa Golfin	6; 1	6; 1
2	(Peru) (Costa Rica)	Laura Gildemeister; Paula Umaña	6; 2	6; 3
3	(Peru) (Costa Rica)	Laura Gildemeister / Pilar Vásquez; Karla Golfin / Paula Umaña	6; 3	6; 3

== Trinidad and Tobago vs. Bolivia ==
Trinidad and Tobago
2
Palmas del Mar, Humacao, Puerto Rico
20 April 1993
Hard (outdoors)

Bolivia
1

			1	2	3
1	(Trinidad and Tobago) (Bolivia)	Kaisaran Siewrattan; Sandra Kellemberger	6; 3	4; 6	1; 6
2	(Trinidad and Tobago) (Bolivia)	Elizabeth Gibson; Natasha Villarroel	6; 2	4; 6	6; 2
3	(Trinidad and Tobago) (Bolivia)	Beverly Corbie / Elizabeth Gibson; Sandra Kellemberger / Natasha Villarroel	6; 3	6; 1

== Peru vs. Bolivia ==
Peru
3
Palmas del Mar, Humacao, Puerto Rico
21 April 1993
Hard (outdoors)

Bolivia
0

			1	2	3
1	(Peru) (Bolivia)	Pilar Vásquez; Sandra Kellemberger	6; 1	6; 1
2	(Peru) (Bolivia)	Laura Gildemeister; Natasha Villarroel	6; 0	6; 3
3	(Peru) (Bolivia)	Gianfranca Devercelli / Pilar Vásquez; Sandra Kellemberger / Natasha Villarroel	6; 1	6; 2

== Trinidad and Tobago vs. Barbados ==
Trinidad and Tobago
3
Palmas del Mar, Humacao, Puerto Rico
21 April 1993
Hard (outdoors)

Barbados
0

			1	2	3
1	(Trinidad and Tobago) (Barbados)	Kaisaran Siewrattan; Jennifer Carter	6; 0	7; 5
2	(Trinidad and Tobago) (Barbados)	Elizabeth Gibson; Amanda Browne	6; 1	6; 3
3	(Trinidad and Tobago) (Barbados)	Beverly Corbie / Elizabeth Gibson; Jennifer Carter / Kibibi Moseley	6; 1	6; 1

== Peru vs. Trinidad and Tobago ==
Peru
3
Palmas del Mar, Humacao, Puerto Rico
22 April 1993
Hard (outdoors)

Trinidad and Tobago
0

			1	2	3
1	(Peru) (Trinidad and Tobago)	Pilar Vásquez; Kaisaran Siewrattan	6; 2	6; 0
2	(Peru) (Trinidad and Tobago)	Laura Gildemeister; Elizabeth Gibson	6; 2	6; 2
3	(Peru) (Trinidad and Tobago)	Gianfranca Devercelli / Laura Gildemeister; Beverly Corbie / Elizabeth Gibson	6; 3	6; 3

== Costa Rica vs. Barbados ==
Costa Rica
3
Palmas del Mar, Humacao, Puerto Rico
22 April 1993
Hard (outdoors)

Barbados
0

			1	2	3
1	(Costa Rica) (Barbados)	Melissa Golfin; Jennifer Carter	6; 2	6; 2
2	(Costa Rica) (Barbados)	Paula Umaña; Amanda Browne	6; 4	6; 4
3	(Costa Rica) (Barbados)	Melissa Golfin / Paula Umaña; Jennifer Carter / Kibibi Moseley	6; 0	6; 4

== Trinidad and Tobago vs. Costa Rica ==
Trinidad and Tobago
3
Palmas del Mar, Humacao, Puerto Rico
23 April 1993
Hard (outdoors)

Costa Rica
0

			1	2	3
1	(Trinidad and Tobago) (Costa Rica)	Kaisaran Siewrattan; Melissa Golfin	5; 7	6; 4	7; 5
2	(Trinidad and Tobago) (Costa Rica)	Elizabeth Gibson; Paula Umaña	7; 5	6; 1
3	(Trinidad and Tobago) (Costa Rica)	Beverly Corbie / Kaisaran Siewrattan; Karla Umaña / Paula Umaña	6; 0	7; 5

== Bolivia vs. Barbados ==
Bolivia
2
Palmas del Mar, Humacao, Puerto Rico
23 April 1993
Hard (outdoors)

Barbados
1

			1	2	3
1	(Bolivia) (Barbados)	Sandra Kellemberger; Gillian Carter	6; 0	6; 1
2	(Bolivia) (Barbados)	Natasha Villarroel; Amanda Browne	2; 6	6; 0	4; 6
3	(Bolivia) (Barbados)	Paola Céspedes / Sandra Kellemberger; Jennifer Carter / Kibibi Moseley	6; 1	6; 3

== See also ==
- Fed Cup structure
