= Miriam D'Agostini =

Brazilian tennis player

- Country (sports): Brazil
- Born: 15 August 1978 (age 46); Passo Fundo, Brazil
- Height: 1.64 m (5 ft 4 1/2 in)
- Turned pro: 1991
- Retired: 2001
- Prize money: $80,257

Singles
- Career record: 158–124
- Career titles: 8 ITF
- Highest ranking: No. 188 (10 July 2000)

Grand Slam singles results
- US Open: Q1 (2000)

Doubles
- Career record: 161–88
- Career titles: 15 ITF
- Highest ranking: No. 128 (30 September 1996)

Other doubles tournaments
- Olympic Games: 1R (1996)

Miriam D'Agostini (born 15 August 1978) is a former professional Brazilian tennis player.

In her career, she won eight singles titles and 15 doubles titles on the ITF Women's Circuit. On 10 September 2000, she reached her best singles ranking of world number 188. On 10 September 2000, she peaked at number 159 in the WTA doubles rankings.

Playing for Brazil Fed Cup team, D'Agostini has a win–loss record of 13–12.

== ITF finals ==
Legend
$25,000 tournaments
$10,000 tournaments

=== Singles: 16 (8 titles, 8 runner-ups) ===
Result	No.	Date	Location	Surface	Opponent	Score
Win	1.	25 September 1994	Guayaquil, Ecuador	Clay	(Argentina) María Fernanda Landa	6–2, 5–7, 1–0 ret.
Loss	2.	19 February 1995	Bogotá, Colombia	Clay	(Brazil) Luciana Tella	3–6, 6–7^{(5)}
Win	3.	5 November 1995	Santiago, Chile	Clay	(Argentina) Celeste Contín	6–2, 6–1
Loss	4.	19 November 1995	Buenos Aires, Argentina	Clay	(Argentina) Paola Suárez	2–6, 1–6
Loss	5.	23 March 1997	Mante, Mexico	Hard	(Chinese Taipei) Stephanie Chi	2–6, 3–6
Loss	6.	1 June 1997	San Salvador, El Salvador	Clay	(Argentina) Cintia Tortorella	7–6^{(2)}, 4–6, 3–6
Loss	7.	17 August 1997	Margarita Island, Venezuela	Hard	(United States) Adria Engel	6–7^{(4)}, 4–6
Win	8.	31 August 1997	Guayaquil, Ecuador	Clay	(Chile) Paula Cabezas	6–7, 7–5, 7–6^{(4)}
Win	9.	7 September 1997	Lima, Peru	Clay	(Argentina) Romina Ottoboni	6–3, 6–0
Win	10.	21 September 1997	Santiago, Chile	Clay	(Argentina) Laura Montalvo	4–6, 6–2, 6–1
Win	11.	9 November 1997	Suzano, Brazil	Clay	(United States) Aurandrea Narvaez	4–6, 6–3, 6–3
Loss	12.	21 November 1999	Campos, Brazil	Clay	(Hungary) Kira Nagy	7–5, 3–6, 2–6
Win	13.	28 November 1997	Rio de Janeiro, Brazil	Clay	(United States) Alice Canepa	3–6, 6–2, 6–3
Loss	14.	5 December 1999	Cali, Colombia	Clay	(Colombia) Fabiola Zuluaga	0–6, 1–6
Loss	15.	2 April 2000	Santiago, Chile	Clay	(Argentina) Melisa Arévalo	3–6, 3–6
Win	16.	7 May 2000	Coatzacoalcos, Mexico	Hard	(Brazil) Joana Cortez	6–4, 2–6, 6–1

=== Doubles: 36 (15 titles, 21 runner-ups) ===
Result	No.	Date	Tournament	Surface	Partner	Opponents	Score
Win	1.	3 October 1993	ITF Lima, Peru	Clay	(Paraguay) Magalí Benítez	(Colombia) Carmiña Giraldo (Colombia) Ximena Rodríguez	6–4, 6–2
Loss	2.	30 October 1994	ITF São Paulo, Brazil	Clay	(Brazil) Vanessa Menga	(Brazil) Luciana Tella (Brazil) Andrea Vieira	6–4, 3–6, 1–6
Win	3.	30 October 1995	ITF Santiago, Chile	Clay	(Hungary) Katalin Marosi	(Chile) Bárbara Castro (Chile) María-Alejandra Quezada	6–0, 6–3
Win	4.	6 November 1995	ITF São Paulo, Brazil	Clay	(Hungary) Katalin Marosi	(Argentina) Laura Montalvo (Argentina) Cintia Tortorella	6–1, 1–6, 7–5
Win	5.	13 November 1995	ITF Buenos Aires, Argentina	Clay	(Hungary) Katalin Marosi	(Argentina) Florencia Cianfagna (Argentina) Paola Suárez	6–7^{(4)}, 6–0, 6–3
Loss	6.	18 February 1996	ITF Cali, Colombia	Clay	(Paraguay) Larissa Schaerer	(Spain) Eva Bes (Spain) Paula Hermida	3–6, 6–2, 3–6
Loss	7.	5 May 1996	ITF Florianópolis, Brazil	Clay	(Brazil) Andrea Vieira	(Argentina) Florencia Cianfagna (Monaco) Emmanuelle Gagliardi	6–4, 4–6, 4–6
Loss	8.	26 May 1996	ITF Novi Sad, Serbia	Clay	(Paraguay) Larissa Schaerer	(Netherlands) Seda Noorlander (Czech Republic) Helena Vildová	6–4, 1–6, 1–6
Win	9.	1 September 1996	ITF Sochi, Russia	Clay	(Dominican Republic) Joelle Schad	(Russia) Olga Ivanova (Russia) Anna Linkova	6–4, 6–3
Win	10.	8 September 1996	ITF Spoleto, Italy	Clay	(Portugal) Sofia Prazeres	(Spain) Alicia Ortuño (Dominican Republic) Joelle Schad	6–4, 6–4
Win	11.	27 October 1996	ITF Rio Grande do Sul, Brazil	Clay	(Brazil) Andrea Vieira	(Brazil) Roberta Burzagli (Brazil) Luciana Della Casa	6–7^{(5)}, 6–3, 6–0
Loss	12.	10 November 1996	ITF São Paulo, Brazil	Clay	(Brazil) Andrea Vieira	(Argentina) Mariana Diaz-Oliva (Paraguay) Larissa Schaerer	6–3, 4–6, 2–6
Loss	13.	24 November 1996	ITF São Paulo, Brazil	Clay	(Brazil) Vanessa Menga	(Zimbabwe) Cara Black (Kazakhstan) Irina Selyutina	6–3, 3–6, 2–6
Loss	14.	1 December 1996	ITF São Paulo, Brazil	Clay	(Brazil) Andrea Vieira	(Argentina) Laura Montalvo (Brazil) Luciana Tella	3–6, 4–6
Loss	15.	14 April 1997	ITF Elvas, Portugal	Hard	(Spain) Alicia Ortuño	(Canada) Aneta Soukup (Norway) Tina Samara	4–6, 5–7
Loss	16.	11 May 1997	ITF Tortosa, Spain	Clay	(Argentina) Veronica Stele	(Spain) Marta Cano (Spain) Nuria Montero	3–6, 6–1, 4–6
Win	17.	1 June 1997	ITF San Salvador, El Salvador	Clay	(Argentina) Cintia Tortorella	(United States) Jacquelyn Rosen (Peru) María Eugenia Rojas	6–4, 6–0
Win	18.	31 August 1997	ITF Guayaquil, Ecuador	Clay	(Chile) Paula Cabezas	(Argentina) Mariana Lopez Palacios (Argentina) Romina Ottoboni	6–1, 6–4
Loss	19.	28 September 1997	ITF Tucumán, Argentina	Clay	(Brazil) Vanessa Menga	(Zimbabwe) Cara Black (Kazakhstan) Irina Selyutina	3–6, 1–6
Loss	20.	20 October 1997	ITF Novo Hamburgo, Brazil	Clay	(Brazil) Vanessa Menga	(Brazil) Joana Cortez (Brazil) Ana-Paula Zannoni	3–6, 7–6^{(4)}, 1–6
Loss	21.	2 November 1997	ITF Mogi das Cruzes, Brazil	Clay	(Brazil) Vanessa Menga	(Argentina) Laura Montalvo (Argentina) Mercedes Paz	2–6, 0–6
Win	22.	23 November 1997	ITF São Paulo, Brazil	Clay	(Brazil) Vanessa Menga	(Argentina) Celeste Contín (Argentina) Cintia Tortorella	6–1, 6–3
Win	23.	14 December 1997	ITF Bogotá, Colombia	Clay	(Brazil) Vanessa Menga	(Brazil) Eugenia Maia (Paraguay) Larissa Schaerer	6–2, 6–2
Loss	24.	5 October 1998	ITF Santiago, Chile	Clay	(Hungary) Katalin Marosi	(Argentina) Laura Montalvo (Argentina) Paola Suárez	1–6, 2–6
Loss	25.	30 November 1998	ITF Guadalajara, Mexico	Clay	(Hungary) Katalin Marosi	(United States) Lindsay Lee-Waters (United States) Meghann Shaughnessy	1–6, 3–6
Loss	26.	28 November 1999	ITF Rio de Janeiro, Brazil	Clay	(Brazil) Carla Tiene	(Argentina) Celeste Contín (Brazil) Joana Cortez	1–6, 6–3, 3–6
Loss	27.	5 December 1999	ITF Cali, Colombia	Clay	(Paraguay) Larissa Schaerer	(Colombia) Mariana Mesa (Colombia) Fabiola Zuluaga	6–2, 6–7, 1–6
Win	28.	2 April 2000	ITF Santiago, Chile	Clay	(Argentina) Jorgelina Torti	(Argentina) Melisa Arévalo (Argentina) Paula Racedo	6–3, 7–6^{(3)}
Win	29.	16 April 2000	ITF Belo Horizonte, Brazil	Hard	(Brazil) Joana Cortez	(Brazil) Tassia Sono (Brazil) Carla Tiene	6–4, 6–1
Loss	30.	1 May 2000	ITF Coatzacoalcos, Mexico	Hard	(Brazil) Joana Cortez	(Venezuela) Milagros Sequera (Slovakia) Gabriela Voleková	6–4, 3–6, 5–7
Loss	31.	14 May 2000	ITF Midlothian, United States	Clay	(Brazil) Joana Cortez	(United States) Dawn Buth (United States) Julie Scott	3–6, 2–6
Win	32.	21 May 2000	ITF Jackson, United States	Clay	(Brazil) Joana Cortez	(United States) Karin Miller (South Africa) Jessica Steck	6–4, 5–7, 6–1
Loss	33.	11 June 2000	ITF Galatina, Italy	Clay	(Brazil) Joana Cortez	(Italy) Alice Canepa (Argentina) Mariana Díaz-Oliva	4–6, 6–4, 4–6
Loss	34.	2 July 2000	ITF Orbetello, Italy	Clay	(Brazil) Joana Cortez	(China) Li Ting (China) Li Na	3–6, 6–7^{(3)}
Win	35.	7 August 2000	Ladies Open Hechingen, Germany	Clay	(Germany) Angelika Rösch	(South Africa) Natalie Grandin (South Africa) Nicole Rencken	7–6^{(3)}, 6–2
Loss	36.	7 January 2001	ITF São Paulo, Brazil	Hard	(Brazil) Vanessa Menga	(Argentina) Clarisa Fernández (Argentina) Romina Ottoboni	1–6, 6–7^{(6)}
