= Luniuska Delgado =

Venezuelan tennis player (born 2001)

- Country (sports): Venezuela
- Born: 21 November 2001 (age 23)
- Plays: Right-handed (two-handed backhand)
- Prize money: $2,874

Singles
- Career record: 20–19
- Career titles: 0
- Highest ranking: 962 (24 September 2018)

Doubles
- Career record: 5–11
- Career titles: 0
- Highest ranking: 603 (31 December 2018)
- Current ranking: 617 (15 April 2019)

Team competitions
- Fed Cup: 1–0
- Last updated on: 21 April 2019.

Luniuska Delgado (born 21 November 2001) is a Venezuelan tennis player.

== Life ==
She was born in Puerto Ordaz.

Delgado has a career high WTA singles ranking of 962, achieved on 24 September 2018. She also has a career high WTA doubles ranking of 603, achieved on 31 December 2018.

Delgado represents Venezuela in the Fed Cup.
