= Gillian Carter =

American screamo band

- Origin: Palm Bay, Florida
- Genres: screamo; post-rock
- Years active: 2005–present
- Label: Skeletal Lightning Records
- Members: Logan Rivera; Tony Oriza; Bob Caruso

Gillian Carter is an American screamo band from Palm Bay by Orlando, Florida, founded in 2005.

== History ==
Founded in 2005, they released their debut album The Flood That Came After the Storm in 2007. They have since released five studio albums: Having Lost... in 2011, Lost Ships Sinking with the Sunset in 2013, Dreams of Suffocation in 2016, ...This Earth Shaped Tomb in 2018, and Salvation Through Misery in 2022.

== Style ==
The band has been described as bordering between post-rock, melodic hardcore, emo. post-hardcore, and black metal.

== Members ==
- Logan Rivera – vocals, guitar, harmonica
- Tony Oriza - drums
- Bob Caruso - bass

== Discography ==
=== Albums ===
- The Flood That Came After the Storm (2007)
- Having Lost... (2011)
- Lost Ships Sinking with the Sunset (2013)
- Dreams of Suffocation (2016)
- ...This Earth Shaped Tomb (2018)
- Salvation Through Misery (2022)

=== EPs ===
- Always Remembering Decisions (2012)
- Old Nu Songz (2012)
- Songs for Splits (2014)
- Songs for Summer (2022)
