= 1993 Federation Cup Americas Zone – Pool D =

Group D of the 1993 Federation Cup Americas Zone was one of four pools in the Americas zone of the 1993 Federation Cup. Four teams competed in a round robin competition, with the top two teams advancing to the play-offs.

	(Mexico) MEX	(Uruguay) URU	(El Salvador) ESA	(Puerto Rico) PUR	RR; W–L	Set; W–L	Game; W–L	Standings
Mexico		2–1	3–0	3–0	3–0	16–2	102–36	1
Uruguay	1–2		3–0	3–0	2–1	14–5	94–60	2
El Salvador	0–3	0–3		2–1	1–2	5–15	52–101	3
Puerto Rico	0–3	0–3	1–2		0–3	3–16	57–106	4

== Mexico vs. Uruguay ==
Mexico
2
Palmas del Mar, Humacao, Puerto Rico
19 April 1993
Hard (outdoors)

Uruguay
1

			1	2	3
1	(Mexico) (Uruguay)	Xóchitl Escobedo; Patricia Miller	6; 3	6; 0
2	(Mexico) (Uruguay)	Lucila Becerra; Claudia Brause	6; 1	6; 2
3	(Mexico) (Uruguay)	Lucila Becerra / Xóchitl Escobedo; Claudia Brause / Patricia Miller	4; 6	2; 6

== El Salvador vs. Puerto Rico ==
El Salvador
2
Palmas del Mar, Humacao, Puerto Rico
19 April 1993
Hard (outdoors)

Puerto Rico
1

			1	2	3
1	(El Salvador) (Puerto Rico)	Claudia Harrison; Joanne Bauzà	1; 6	3; 6
2	(El Salvador) (Puerto Rico)	Ingrid González; Brenda Santos	6; 4	6; 1
3	(El Salvador) (Puerto Rico)	Ingrid González / Claudia Harrison; Natalie Absuar / Joanne Bauzà	5; 7	6; 2	6; 2

== Mexico vs. Puerto Rico ==
Mexico
3
Palmas del Mar, Humacao, Puerto Rico
20 April 1993
Hard (outdoors)

Puerto Rico
0

			1	2	3
1	(Mexico) (Puerto Rico)	Xóchitl Escobedo; Natalie Absuar	6; 1	6; 3
2	(Mexico) (Puerto Rico)	Lucila Becerra; Joanne Bauzà	6; 1	6; 3
3	(Mexico) (Puerto Rico)	Lucila Becerra / Xóchitl Escobedo; Natalie Absuar / Jenny Sotomayor	6; 2	6; 2

== Mexico vs. El Salvador ==
Mexico
3
Palmas del Mar, Humacao, Puerto Rico
21 April 1993
Hard (outdoors)

El Salvador
0

			1	2	3
1	(Mexico) (El Salvador)	Xóchitl Escobedo; Claudia Harrison	6; 1	6; 4
2	(Mexico) (El Salvador)	Lucila Becerra; Ingrid González	6; 0	6; 1
3	(Mexico) (El Salvador)	Lucila Becerra / Xóchitl Escobedo; Ingrid González / Claudia Harrison	6; 0	6; 0

== Uruguay vs. Puerto Rico ==
Uruguay
3
Palmas del Mar, Humacao, Puerto Rico
22 April 1993
Hard (outdoors)

Puerto Rico
0

			1	2	3
1	(Uruguay) (Puerto Rico)	Laura Olave; Natalie Absuar	6; 2	6; 1
2	(Uruguay) (Puerto Rico)	Claudia Brause; Joanne Bauzà	6; 3	7; 5
3	(Uruguay) (Puerto Rico)	Claudia Brause / Patricia Miller; Joanne Bauzà / Jenny Sotomayor	6; 4	6; 2

== Uruguay vs. El Salvador ==
Uruguay
3
Palmas del Mar, Humacao, Puerto Rico
23 April 1993
Hard (outdoors)

El Salvador
0

			1	2	3
1	(Uruguay) (El Salvador)	Laura Olave; Claudia Harrison	6; 1	6; 1
2	(Uruguay) (El Salvador)	Claudia Brause; Ingrid González	6; 2	3; 6	6; 2
3	(Uruguay) (El Salvador)	Patricia Miller / Ingrid González; Joanne Bauzà / Claudia Harrison	6; 1	6; 0

== See also ==
- Fed Cup structure
