= Ninfa Marra =

Venezuelan tennis player

- Country (sports): Venezuela
- Born: 3 July 1974 (age 51)
- Prize money: $12,411

Singles
- Career record: 48–21
- Career titles: 1 ITF
- Highest ranking: No. 333 (12 July 1993)

Doubles
- Career record: 34–18
- Career titles: 3 ITF
- Highest ranking: No. 240 (29 March 1993)

Ninfa Marra (born 3 July 1974) is a Venezuelan former professional tennis player.

While competing on the professional tour during the 1990s, Marra reached a career high singles ranking of 333 and won an ITF tournament in Guayaquil, as well as three ITF doubles titles.

Marra represented the Venezuela Fed Cup team in 22 ties from 1991 to 1996, winning a total of 20 rubbers, 11 of which came in singles.

== ITF finals ==
=== Singles: 5 (1–4) ===
Result	No.	Date	Tournament	Surface	Opponent	Score
Loss	1.	10 November 1991	Santo Domingo, Dominican Republic	Clay	(Germany) Cornelia Grünes	3–6, 6–2
Win	1.	15 June 1992	Guayaquil, Ecuador	Clay	(Mexico) Xóchitl Escobedo	6–3, 3–6, 6–2
Loss	2.	14 September 1992	Santo Domingo, Dominican Republic	Clay	(Hungary) Virág Csurgó	6–1, 6–7^{(6–8)}, 4–6
Loss	3.	18 October 1992	Santiago, Chile	Clay	(Chile) Paulina Sepúlveda	4–6, 3–6
Loss	4.	23 April 1995	Caracas, Venezuela	Hard	(United States) Alix Creek	4–6, 7–5, 0–6

=== Doubles: 7 (3–4) ===
Result	No.	Date	Tournament	Surface	Partner	Opponents	Score
Win	1.	13 September 1992	Caracas, Venezuela	Clay	(Brazil) Sumara Passos	(Sweden) Maria-Farnes Capistrano (Argentina) Pamela Zingman	6–1, 3–6, 6–2
Loss	1.	20 September 1992	Bogotá, Colombia	Clay	(Brazil) Sumara Passos	(Poland) Anna Moll (Poland) Katarzyna Malec	3–6, 3–6
Win	2.	27 September 1992	Guayaquil, Ecuador	Clay	(Brazil) Sumara Passos	(Argentina) Florencia Cianfagna (Argentina) María Fernanda Landa	6–1, 7–6
Win	3.	11 October 1992	La Paz, Bolivia	Clay	(Sweden) Maria-Farnes Capistrano	(Poland) Anna Moll (Poland) Katarzyna Malec	6–0, 6–2
Loss	2.	18 October 1992	Santiago, Chile	Clay	(Sweden) Maria-Farnes Capistrano	(Chile) Paula Cabezas (Ecuador) Nuria Niemes	6–3, 4–6, 4–6
Loss	3.	26 October 1992	Asunción, Paraguay	Clay	(Paraguay) Magalí Benítez	(Brazil) Christina Rozwadowski (Netherlands) Caroline Stassen	4–6, 1–6
Loss	4.	23 April 1995	Caracas, Venezuela	Hard	(Venezuela) María Virginia Francesa	(United States) Alix Creek (United States) Kristine Kurth	2–6, 6–2, 0–6
