= Giana Gutiérrez =

Colombian tennis player

- Country (sports): Colombia
- Born: 30 May 1976 (age 48)
- Prize money: $29,325

Singles
- Career record: 84–109
- Career titles: 0
- Highest ranking: No. 371 (12 October 1998)

Doubles
- Career record: 87–80
- Career titles: 3 ITF
- Highest ranking: No. 198 (14 February 2000)

Team competitions
- Fed Cup: 4–6

Giana Gutiérrez (born 30 May 1976) is a Colombian former professional tennis player.

== Biography ==
Gutiérrez represented Colombia in the Federation Cup from 1992 to 1994, in a total of seven ties. This included one World Group tie, against Germany in Frankfurt in 1994, which she featured in as a doubles player.

At the 1998 Central American and Caribbean Games in Maracaibo, Gutiérrez won a bronze medal for Colombia in the women's singles competition.

Most of her professional career was played on the ITF Circuit, but she did appear in the Copa Colsanitas, a WTA Tour tournament in Bogotá. She fell in the final round of the singles qualifying draw in 1998 and 1999, then featured in the doubles main-draw in 2000, reaching the quarterfinals.

== ITF Circuit finals ==
$25,000 tournaments
$10,000 tournaments

=== Singles: 2 (0–2) ===
Result	Date	Tournament	Surface	Opponent	Score
Loss	1 September 1996	ITF La Paz, Bolivia	Clay	(Germany) Nina Nittinger	6–7, 3–6
Loss	30 September 1996	ITF Bogotá, Colombia	Clay	(Colombia) Carmiña Giraldo	1–6, 3–6

=== Doubles: 15 (3–12) ===
Result	Date	Tournament	Surface	Partner	Opponents	Score
Loss	7 February 1994	ITF Bogotá, Colombia	Clay	(Colombia) Cecilia Hincapié	(Ecuador) María Dolores Campana (Venezuela) María Virginia Francesa	6–4, 6–7^{(6)}, 4–6
Win	3 October 1994	ITF La Paz, Bolivia	Clay	(Bolivia) Cecilia Ampuero	(Peru) Carla Rodriguez (Peru) Lorena Rodriguez	6–2, 6–3
Loss	20 November 1995	ITF Curaçao, Netherlands	Hard	(Germany) Nina Nittinger	(Mexico) Jessica Fernández (Germany) Cornelia Grünes	2–6, 1–6
Win	6 October 1996	ITF Bogotá, Colombia	Clay	(Argentina) Romina Ottoboni	(United Kingdom) Joanne Moore (Colombia) Carmiña Giraldo	1–6, 6–3, 6–1
Loss	11 November 1996	ITF San Salvador, El Salvador	Clay	(Indonesia) Liza Andriyani	(Hungary) Nóra Köves (United Kingdom) Joanne Moore	6–2, 5–7, 6–7^{(1)}
Loss	3 May 1998	ITF San Severo, Italy	Clay	(Argentina) Veronica Stele	(Argentina) Romina Ottoboni (Brazil) Eugenia Maia	6–1, 5–7, 5–7
Loss	10 May 1998	ITF Quartu Sant'Elena, Italy	Grass	(Lithuania) Galina Misiuriova	(Italy) Flavia Pennetta (Italy) Roberta Vinci	3–6, 0–6
—	12 July 1998	ITF Amersfoort, Netherlands	Clay	(Netherlands) Debby Haak	(Netherlands) Yvette Basting (Netherlands) Henriëtte van Aalderen	NP
Loss	19 July 1998	ITF Civitanova, Italy	Clay	(Netherlands) Debby Haak	(Czech Republic) Magdalena Zděnovcová (Czech Republic) Jana Lubasová	3–6, 4–6
Loss	26 July 1998	ITF Camaiore, Italy	Clay	(Brazil) Eugenia Maia	(Czech Republic) Zuzana Hejdová (Croatia) Marijana Kovačević	2–6, 0–6
Loss	25 April 1999	ITF Bari, Italy	Clay	(Netherlands) Debby Haak	(Netherlands) Lotty Seelen (Netherlands) Susanne Trik	4–6, 3–6
Loss	24 May 1999	ITF Guimarães, Portugal	Hard	(Italy) Sabina Da Ponte	(Republic of Ireland) Kelly Liggan (Israel) Tzipora Obziler	3–6, 1–6
Loss	4 July 1999	ITF Mont-de-Marsan, France	Clay	(Argentina) Romina Ottoboni	(Argentina) María Fernanda Landa (Spain) Eva Bes	4–6, 4–6
Loss	11 July 1999	ITF Le Touquet, France	Clay	(Slovakia) Silvia Uricková	(France) Aurélie Védy (France) Stéphanie Rizzi	3–6, 7–6, 4–6
Loss	1 August 1999	ITF Les Contamines, France	Hard	(Netherlands) Andrea van den Hurk	(France) Caroline Dhenin (Czech Republic) Eva Melicharová	4–6, 2–6
Win	15 August 1999	Open Saint Gaudens, France	Clay	(Argentina) Sabrina Valenti	(Australia) Mireille Dittmann (United Kingdom) Nicola Payne	6–3, 6–2

== See also ==
- List of Colombia Fed Cup team representatives
