= María Virginia Francesa =

Venezuelan tennis player (born 1974)

- Country (sports): Venezuela
- Born: 25 March 1974 (age 51)
- Prize money: $10,975

Singles
- Career record: 38–30
- Highest ranking: No. 311 (30 Nov 1992)

Doubles
- Career record: 30–27
- Career titles: 2 ITF
- Highest ranking: No. 380 (14 Sep 1992)
Medal record
Central American and Caribbean Games
Gold medal – first place	1993 Ponce	Women's doubles
Silver medal – second place	1993 Ponce	Women's singles
Bronze medal – third place	1990 Mexico City	Women's team
Bronze medal – third place	1993 Ponce	Women's team
South American Games
Gold medal – first place	1994 Valencia	Mixed doubles
Silver medal – second place	1994 Valencia	Women's doubles
Silver medal – second place	1994 Valencia	Women's team

María Virginia Francesa (born 25 March 1974) is a Venezuelan former professional tennis player.

Raised in Caracas, Francesa represented the Venezuela Fed Cup team in 19 ties, debuting in 1991. She won a total of 18 rubbers, nine in singles and nine in doubles. Her last appearance in 2001 was a World Group play-off tie against Croatia.

On the professional tour she reached a career high singles ranking of 311 and won two doubles titles on the ITF Women's Circuit. She had a best doubles ranking of 380 in the world.

Francesa won a gold medal at the 1993 Central American and Caribbean Games in women's doubles (with Ninfa Marra) and a mixed doubles gold medal at the 1994 South American Games (with Jimy Szymanski). She also competed for Venezuela in two editions of the Pan American Games.

== ITF finals ==
=== Singles: 1 (0–1) ===
Result	No.	Date	Tournament	Surface	Opponent	Score
Loss	1.	30 August 1992	Querétaro, Mexico	Hard	(Brazil) Cláudia Chabalgoity	2–6, 3–6

=== Doubles: 3 (2–1) ===
Result	No.	Date	Tournament	Surface	Partner	Opponents	Score
Win	1.	13 February 1994	Bogotá, Colombia	Clay	(Ecuador) María Dolores Campana	(Colombia) Giana Gutiérrez (Colombia) Cecilia Hincapié	4–6, 7–6^{(6)}, 6–4
Loss	1.	23 April 1995	Caracas, Venezuela	Hard	(Venezuela) Ninfa Marra	(United States) Alix Creek (United States) Kristine Kurth	2–6, 6–2, 0–6
Win	2.	30 July 2000	Caracas, Venezuela	Hard	(Venezuela) María Vento	(United States) Candice de la Torre (Slovakia) Gabriela Voleková	6–1, 6–4
