= Cecilia Hincapié =

Colombian tennis player

- Country (sports): Colombia
- Born: 20 November 1976 (age 48)
- Prize money: $10,032

Singles
- Career titles: 1 ITF
- Highest ranking: No. 405 (1 August 1994)

Doubles
- Highest ranking: No. 335 (14 November 1994)

Team competitions
- Fed Cup: 8–5

Cecilia Hincapié (born 20 November 1976) is a Colombian former professional tennis player.

Hincapié, who comes from Manizales, competed on the international tour in the early 1990s. She reached a best singles ranking of 405 in the world and won one ITF title. From 1993 to 1995 she represented the Colombia Fed Cup team, which included World Group appearances in the first two years.

Her career continued in the United States in the late 1990s, where she played college tennis for Auburn University at Montgomery. She earned NAIA All-American selection in each of her three seasons, between 1996 and 1998, before moving to Clemson University as a senior in 1999.

== ITF finals ==
=== Singles: 4 (1–3) ===
Outcome	No.	Date	Tournament	Surface	Opponent	Score
Runner-up	1.	14 September 1992	Bogotá, Colombia	Clay	(Brazil) Sumara Passos	6–2, 4–6, 1–6
Runner-up	2.	16 November 1992	San Salvador, El Salvador	Hard	(Cuba) Belkis Rodríguez	4–6, 4–6
Runner-up	3.	19 April 1993	San Salvador, El Salvador	Clay	(Mexico) Xóchitl Escobedo	3–6, 0–6
Winner	1.	14 February 1994	Bogotá, Colombia	Clay	(Colombia) Fabiola Zuluaga	6–4, 6–3

=== Doubles: 3 (0–3) ===
Outcome	No.	Date	Tournament	Surface	Partner	Opponents	Score
Runner-up	1.	16 November 1992	San Salvador, El Salvador	Hard	(Colombia) Adriana Garcia	(Cuba) Yoannis Montesino (Cuba) Belkis Rodríguez	2–6, 2–6
Runner-up	2.	19 April 1993	San Salvador, El Salvador	Clay	(Colombia) Carmiña Giraldo	(Mexico) Xóchitl Escobedo (Colombia) Ximena Rodríguez	2–6, 6–2, 4–6
Runner-up	3.	7 February 1994	Bogotá, Colombia	Clay	(Colombia) Giana Gutiérrez	(Ecuador) María Dolores Campana (Venezuela) María Virginia Francesa	6–4, 6–7^{(6)}, 4–6

== See also ==
- List of Colombia Fed Cup team representatives
