= Venezuela Billie Jean King Cup team =

National sports team

Venezuela
- Captain: Yohny Romero
- Nations Ranking: 45 ▼2 (16 November 2015)
- First year: 1984
- Years played: 24
- Ties played (W–L): 96 (54–42)
- Years in World Group: 1 (0–1)
- Best finish: World Group play-offs (1998, 2001)
- Most total wins: Milagros Sequera (36–11)
- Most singles wins: Milagros Sequera (23–5)
- Most doubles wins: María Vento-Kabchi (14–9)
- Best doubles team: Milagros Sequera / María Vento-Kabchi (11–5)
- Most ties played: María Vento-Kabchi (33)
- Most years played: María Vento-Kabchi (8)

The Venezuela Billie Jean King Cup team represents Venezuela in the Billie Jean King Cup tennis competition and are governed by the Venezuelan Tennis Federation, known in Spanish as Federación Venezolana de Tenis. Venezuela will compete in Americas Zone Group I in 2012.

== History ==
Venezuela competed in its first Fed Cup in 1984. Their best result was reaching the World Group play-offs in 1998 and 2001.

=== First team (1984) ===
- Claudia Borgiani
- Stefania Sernaglia

== Players ==
Name	Years	First	Ties	Win/Loss		
Name	Years	First	Ties	Singles	Doubles	Total
Daniela Agostinone	1	1993	2	–	1–1	1–1
Carmen Blanco	1	2013	1	–	0–1	0–1
Claudia Borgiani	1	1984	4	2–2	2–2	4–4
Sofía Elena Cabezas Domínguez	1	2019	1	–	1–0	1–0
Mary Victoria Cancini	1	2021	2	0–1	0–1	0–2
Gabriela Coglitore	1	2012	1	–	1–0	1–0
Avel-Romaly Coronado	4	2002	9	2–4	1–4	3–8
Gabriella de Santis	1	2013	1	–	0–1	0–1
Luniuska Delgado	1	2019	1	–	1–0	1–0
Josymar Escalona	1	2008	1	–	1–0	1–0
María Virginia Francesa	6	1991	19	9–4	9–6	18–10
Andrea Gámiz	9	2011	35	21–13	7–5	28–18
Henriette Gemer	1	1984	2	–	1–1	1–1
Marina Giral Lores	3	2006	8	3–1	4–0	7–1
Mariaryeni Gutiérrez	2	2005	4	0–3	0–2	0–5
Paola Iovino	2	2003	6	5–0	1–3	6–3
Helene Kappler	1	1992	5	0–1	3–2	3–3
Emily Leonardi	1	1990	3	2–1	1–1	3–2
Maria Gabriela Linares de Faría	2	2016	4	–	4–0	4–0
Analía Longoli	1	1998	1	–	0–1	0–1
Briggitt Marcovich	1	2005	3	0–2	1–2	1–4
Ninfa Marra	6	1991	22	11–8	9–5	20–13
Melissa Mazzotta	2	1991	6	5–1	2–1	7–2
Mariana Muci	4	2004	13	1–3	9–1	10–4
Viviana Onorato	1	2015	2	0–1	0–2	0–3
Gabriela Paz	1	2012	5	4–1	0–2	4–3
Adriana Pérez	7	2011	26	10–8	6–8	16–16
Luicelena Pérez	2	2016	4	–	3–1	3–1
Daniela Ramírez	1	2021	2	–	0–2	0–2
Mariela Salinas	2	1997	7	1–6	1–2	2–8
Stephanie Schaer	4	1999	11	2–6	2–7	4–13
Milagros Sequera	6	1998	26	23–5	13–6	36–11
Stefania Sernaglia	1	1984	4	2–2	1–1	3–3
Paola Stephen	1	1997	4	0–1	1–3	1–4
Claudia Strauss	1	2003	3	–	2–1	2–1
Fabiana Taverna	2	1998	3	–	0–3	0–3
Aymet Uzcátegui	6	2015	20	8–9	7–4	15–13
Eleonora Vegliante	3	1990	11	4–3	5–5	9–8
María Vento-Kabchi	8	1990	33	21–11	14–9	35–20

=== Current team (2026) ===
- Sofia Elena Cabezas Dominguez
- Andrea Magallanes
- Andrea Alejandra Noguera Mendoza
- Bethania Carolina Bonaguro La Roche
- Samantha Martinez

== See also ==
- Billie Jean King Cup
- Venezuela Davis Cup team
