= María-Alejandra Quezada =

Chilean tennis player

- Country (sports): Chile
- Born: 7 March 1974 (age 51)
- Prize money: $13,941

Singles
- Career record: 39–65
- Highest ranking: No. 514 (12 June 1995)

Doubles
- Career record: 55–63
- Career titles: 1 ITF
- Highest ranking: No. 319 (5 February 1996)

Team competitions
- Fed Cup: 10–8

María-Alejandra Quezada Carrasco (born 7 March 1974) is a Chilean former professional tennis player.

Quezada was a Fed Cup player for Chile during the 1990s, appearing in a total of 17 ties. Her Fed Cup career included a World Group fixture against Spain in 1994, where she played a singles rubber against Conchita Martínez, two-weeks after the Spaniard had won Wimbledon. She lost to Martínez in straight sets, but it would be the only one of her eight singles rubbers that she failed to win in her career. In doubles, she had a 3–7 win–loss record.

At the 1994 South American Games tennis tournament, Quezada was a gold medalist in the women's doubles, partnering Bárbara Castro, as well as a bronze medalist in the singles event.

== ITF Circuit finals ==
=== Doubles: 8 (1 title, 7 runner-ups) ===
Result	No.	Date	Tournament	Surface	Partner	Opponents	Score
Loss	1.	2 May 1993	ITF Santiago, Chile	Clay	(Chile) Bárbara Castro	(Argentina) Maria Inés Araiz (Argentina) Pamela Zingman	1–6, 4–6
Loss	2.	16 October 1994	ITF Santiago, Chile	Clay	(Chile) Bárbara Castro	(Argentina) Mariana Eberle (Argentina) María Fernanda Landa	3–6, 6–4, 5–7
Loss	3.	6 November 1994	ITF Freeport, Bahamas	Clay	(Chile) Bárbara Castro	(United States) Ingrid Kurta (Netherlands) Martine Vosseberg	6–4, 4–6, 6–7^{(2)}
Loss	4.	13 November 1994	ITF Santo Domingo, Dominican Republic	Clay	(Chile) Bárbara Castro	(Dominican Republic) Joelle Schad (Spain) Noelia Serra	1–5 ret.
Win	1.	1 October 1995	ITF Guayaquil, Ecuador	Clay	(Chile) Bárbara Castro	(Argentina) Mariana Díaz Oliva (Brazil) Eugenia Maia	7–6^{(5)}, 6–1
Loss	5.	8 October 1995	ITF Lima, Peru	Hard	(Chile) Bárbara Castro	(Sweden) Maria-Farnes Capistrano (Finland) Linda Jansson	2–6, 6–2, 3–6
Loss	6.	5 November 1995	ITF Santiago, Chile	Clay	(Chile) Bárbara Castro	(Brazil) Miriam D'Agostini (Brazil) Katalin Marosi	0–6, 3–6
Loss	7.	21 September 1998	ITF Santiago, Chile	Clay	(Argentina) Mariana Lopez Palacios	(Switzerland) Aliénor Tricerri (Chile) Paula Cabezas	4–6, 1–6
