= Carmiña Giraldo =

Colombian tennis player

- Country (sports): Colombia
- Born: 6 August 1976 (age 49)
- Prize money: $30,625

Singles
- Highest ranking: No. 256 (22 September 1997)

Doubles
- Highest ranking: No. 300 (15 July 1996)

Carmiña Giraldo (born 6 August 1976) is a Colombian former professional tennis player.

== Biography ==
Giraldo comes from the city of Pereira in Risaralda and is the elder sister of Colombian Davis Cup competitor Santiago Giraldo, who is the country's highest ever ranked male player.

From 1992 to 1997, Giraldo represented the Colombia Fed Cup team in a total of 23 ties. Her biggest performances at Fed Cup level include partnering Cecilia Hincapié in a doubles win over Chile in the 1993 World Group Play-off, secured 13–11 in the third set, to prevent Colombia being demoted. In a 1994 World Group tie against Germany she took the second set off top 20 player Anke Huber in a singles rubber, before losing in the third.

Giraldo reached her best singles ranking of 256 in 1997 and left the professional tour at the end of the year to attend Clemson University in the United States. As a member of the Clemson Tigers women's tennis team she earned All-ACC selection in both 1999 and 2000.

Graduating in 2001, Giraldo never returned full-time to the tour, but did make a comeback as a wildcard at the 2001 Copa Colsanitas, a WTA Tour tournament in her home country. She lost to Eva Martincová in the first round of the singles but made the quarter-finals of the doubles, partnering Catalina Castaño.

== ITF finals ==
=== Singles (3–2) ===
Result	No.	Date	Tournament	Surface	Opponent	Score
Loss	1.	15 November 1992	Freeport, Bahamas	Hard	(United States) Lisa Albano	2–6, 4–6
Loss	2.	15 November 1993	San Salvador, El Salvador	Hard	(Ecuador) María Dolores Campana	1–6, 6–4, 3–6
Win	1.	18 September 1995	Manizales, Colombia	Clay	(Argentina) Mariana Díaz Oliva	6–3, 6–4
Win	2.	15 October 1995	La Paz, Bolivia	Clay	(Finland) Linda Jansson	6–2, 6–4
Win	3.	30 September 1996	Bogotá, Colombia	Clay	(Colombia) Giana Gutiérrez	6–1, 6–3

=== Doubles (1–10) ===
Outcome	No.	Date	Tournament	Surface	Partner	Opponents	Score
Loss	1.	19 April 1993	San Salvador, El Salvador	Clay	(Colombia) Cecilia Hincapié	(Mexico) Xóchitl Escobedo (Colombia) Ximena Rodríguez	2–6, 6–2, 4–6
Loss	2.	3 October 1993	Lima, Peru	Clay	(Colombia) Ximena Rodríguez	(Paraguay) Magalí Benítez (Brazil) Miriam D'Agostini	4–6, 2–6
Loss	3.	10 October 1993	La Paz, Bolivia	Clay	(Colombia) Ximena Rodríguez	(Peru) Carla Rodriguez (Peru) Lorena Rodriguez	5–7, 2–6
Loss	4.	15 November 1993	San Salvador, El Salvador	Hard	(Colombia) Ximena Rodríguez	(Ecuador) María Dolores Campana (United Kingdom) Joanne Moore	3–6, 4–6
Loss	5.	8 August 1994	Paderborn, Germany	Clay	(South Africa) Nannie de Villiers	(Slovakia) Nora Kovařčíková (Slovakia) Simona Nedorostová	2–6, 4–6
Loss	6.	15 August 1994	Bergisch, Germany	Clay	(South Africa) Nannie de Villiers	(Germany) Sabine Gerke (Austria) Elisabeth Habeler	3–6, 2–6
Loss	7.	4 December 1994	São Paulo, Brazil	Hard	(Costa Rica) Paula Umaña	(Brazil) Vanessa Menga (Brazil) Luciana Tella	2–6, 3–6
Loss	8.	11 September 1995	Bucaramanga, Colombia	Clay	(Colombia) Mariana Mesa	(United Kingdom) Joanne Moore (Colombia) Ximena Rodríguez	5–7, 6–4, 4–6
Win	1.	8 April 1996	Calvi, France	Hard	(Colombia) Ximena Rodríguez	(Romania) Alida Gallovits (Czech Republic) Petra Plačková	w/o
Loss	9.	30 September 1996	Bogotá, Colombia	Clay	(United Kingdom) Joanne Moore	(Colombia) Giana Gutiérrez (Argentina) Romina Ottoboni	6–1, 3–6, 1–6
Loss	10.	16 June 1997	Caserta, Italy	Clay	(Argentina) Paula Racedo	(Israel) Limor Gabai (Russia) Lioudmila Skavronskaia	3–6, 3–6
