= Paula Cabezas =

Chilean tennis player

- Full name: Paula Andrea Cabezas
- Country (sports): Chile
- Born: 21 August 1972 (age 53) Santiago, Chile
- Prize money: $67,345

Singles
- Career record: 166–87
- Career titles: 14 ITF
- Highest ranking: No. 212 (14 April 1997)

Doubles
- Career record: 126–61
- Career titles: 17 ITF
- Highest ranking: No. 178 (8 June 1992)

Team competitions
- Fed Cup: 49–21

Paula Andrea Cabezas (born 21 August 1972) is a Chilean former professional tennis player.

== Biography ==
Born in Santiago, Cabezas competed on the professional tour in the 1990s, mostly on the ITF Circuit, winning 14 singles and 17 doubles titles. Her WTA Tour performances include a semifinal appearance in the doubles at São Paulo in 1991, partnering with Andrea Vieira. She qualified for her only singles main draw at the 1995 Puerto Rico Open. She reached a best singles ranking of 212 in the world, attained in 1997.

During her career, she featured in a total of 39 ties for the Chile Fed Cup team. This included a World Group fixture against defending champions Spain in 1994, where she lost a singles match to world No. 2, Arantxa Sánchez Vicario. She won 49 matches overall, 23 of them in doubles, both of which are national records.

Cabezas represented Chile in doubles at the 1996 Atlanta Olympics and was a multiple Pan American Games medalist. She won a bronze medal at the 1991 Pan American Games in Havana and a silver at the 1999 Pan American Games in Winnipeg, both in doubles.

She now lives in Barcelona and competes on the ITF seniors circuit under Spanish nationality.

== ITF Circuit finals ==
$25,000 tournaments
$10,000 tournaments

=== Singles: 19 (14 titles, 5 runner-ups) ===
Result	No.	Date	Tournament	Surface	Opponent	Score
Win	1.	9 September 1991	ITF Guayaquil, Ecuador	Clay	(Argentina) María Luciana Reynares	6–1, 6–7^{(6)}, 6–1
Win	2.	1 October 1991	ITF La Paz, Bolivia	Clay	(Peru) Lorena Rodríguez di Laura	6–2, 6–2
Win	3.	7 October 1991	ITF Santiago, Chile	Clay	(Argentina) María Luciana Reynares	7–5, 6–3
Win	4.	3 November 1991	ITF Porto Alegre, Brazil	Clay	(Brazil) Sumara Passos	6–7^{(9)}, 7–5, 6–2
Win	5.	6 September 1993	ITF Caracas, Venezuela	Clay	(Paraguay) Magalí Benítez	5–7, 6–2, 6–3
Loss	1.	26 September 1993	ITF Guayaquil, Ecuador	Clay	(Brazil) Sumara Passos	5–7, 2–6
Win	6.	11 October 1993	ITF Santiago, Chile	Clay	(Argentina) Cintia Tortorella	6–3, 6–4
Win	7.	14 March 1994	ITF Mexico City, Mexico	Clay	(Japan) Tomoe Hotta	6–3, 4–6, 6–2
Win	8.	27 March 1994	ITF Puerto Vallarta, Mexico	Clay	(Canada) Renata Kolbovic	6–2, 6–3
Win	9.	15 May 1994	ITF Acapulco, Mexico	Clay	(United States) Lindsay Lee-Waters	6–2, 6–2
Loss	2.	6 November 1994	ITF Freeport, Bahamas	Clay	(United States) Ingrid Kurta	6–3, 1–6, 5–7
Loss	3.	13 November 1994	ITF Santo Domingo, Dominican Republic	Clay	(Dominican Republic) Joelle Schad	3–6, 2–6
Win	10.	20 November 1994	ITF San Salvador, El Salvador	Hard	(United States) Kristine Kurth	6–2, 6–2
Win	11.	4 June 1995	ITF Sevilla, Spain	Clay	(Spain) Marta Cano	6–1, 6–3
Win	12.	13 October 1996	ITF Mexico City, Mexico	Hard	(Canada) Renata Kolbovic	2–6, 6–3, 6–2
Win	13.	20 October 1996	ITF Coatzacoalcos, Mexico	Hard	(Mexico) Karin Palme	5–7, 7–5, 6–2
Loss	4.	31 August 1997	ITF Guayaquil, Ecuador	Clay	(Brazil) Miriam D'Agostini	7–6^{(0)}, 5–7, 6–7^{(4)}
Loss	5.	12 April 1998	ITF Viña del Mar, Chile	Clay	(Argentina) Celeste Contín	2–6, 4–6
Win	14.	27 September 1998	ITF Santiago, Chile	Clay	(Argentina) Mariana Lopez Palacios	6–4, 7–5

=== Doubles: 25 (17 titles, 8 runner-ups) ===
Result	No.	Date	Tournament	Surface	Partner	Opponents	Score
Win	1.	14 October 1990	ITF La Paz, Bolivia	Clay	(Paraguay) Sandra Ugarriza	(Argentina) Paula Boccia (Argentina) Inés Gorrochategui	6–2, 4–6, 7–5
Loss	1.	22 October 1990	ITF Santiago, Chile	Clay	(Paraguay) Sandra Ugarriza	(Argentina) Inés Gorrochategui (Uruguay) Patricia Miller	6–3, 1–6, 5–7
Win	2.	9 September 1991	ITF Guayaquil, Ecuador	Clay	(Ecuador) Nuria Niemes	(Chile) Macarena Miranda (Ecuador) María Dolores Campana	6–1, 7–5
Win	3.	16 September 1991	ITF Bogotá, Colombia	Clay	(Chile) Macarena Miranda	(Peru) Carla Rodriguez (Peru) Lorena Rodríguez di Laura	6–4, 6–2
Loss	2.	30 September 1991	ITF La Paz, Bolivia	Clay	(Brazil) Janaina Mercadante	(Paraguay) Rossana de los Ríos (Paraguay) Larissa Schaerer	3–6, 5–7
Win	4.	13 October 1991	ITF Santiago, Chile	Clay	(Chile) Paulina Sepúlveda	(Venezuela) Helene Kappler (Venezuela) Eleonora Vegliante	7–5, 2–6, 6–4
Win	5.	4 November 1991	ITF Florianópolis, Brazil	Clay	(Chile) Macarena Miranda	(Cuba) Rita Pichardo (Cuba) Belkis Rodríguez	3–6, 6–2, 6–2
Loss	3.	11 November 1991	ITF Rio de Janeiro, Brazil	Clay	(Chile) Macarena Miranda	(Cuba) Rita Pichardo (Cuba) Belkis Rodríguez	2–6, 3–6
Win	6.	18 October 1992	ITF Santiago, Chile	Clay	(Ecuador) Nuria Niemes	(Sweden) Maria-Farnes Capistrano (Venezuela) Ninfa Marra	3–6, 6–4, 6–4
Win	7.	29 November 1992	ITF Buenos Aires, Argentina	Clay	(Chile) Paulina Sepúlveda	(Argentina) Mariana Randrup (Argentina) Gretel Gonzalez-Glanzmann	6–2, 6–1
Loss	4.	7 June 1993	ITF Caserta, Italy	Clay	(Italy) Adriana Serra Zanetti	(Slovenia) Karin Lušnic (Croatia) Maja Murić	6–2, 2–6, 3–6
Loss	5.	20 September 1993	ITF Guayaquil, Ecuador	Clay	(Ecuador) Nuria Niemes	(Argentina) Veronica Stele (Argentina) Cintia Tortorella	2–6, 1–6
Win	8.	21 March 1994	ITF Puerto Vallarta, Mexico	Clay	(Ecuador) María Dolores Campana	(Japan) Shizuka Tokiwa (Japan) Kiyoko Yazawa	6–1, 6–2
Win	9.	9 May 1994	ITF Acapulco, Mexico	Clay	(Puerto Rico) Emilie Viqueira	(South Africa) Kim Grant (United States) Ditta Huber	3–6, 6–2, 6–1
Win	10.	17 July 1994	ITF Vigo, Spain	Clay	(Puerto Rico) Emilie Viqueira	(Czech Republic) Jitka Dubcová (Austria) Sylvia Plischke	6–4, 6–3
Win	11.	19 September 1994	ITF Guayaquil, Ecuador	Clay	(Puerto Rico) Emilie Viqueira	(Brazil) Vanessa Menga (Brazil) Luciana Tella	6–4, 6–4
Win	12.	6 May 1996	ITF Amazonas, Brazil	Hard	(Chile) Bárbara Castro	(Argentina) Sandra De Amelio (Argentina) Paula Racedo	6–1, 6–3
Loss	6.	6 October 1996	ITF Puerto Vallarta, Mexico	Hard	(Argentina) Veronica Stele	(Argentina) María Fernanda Landa (Germany) Marlene Weingärtner	6–4, 5–7, 3–6
Win	13.	31 August 1997	ITF Guayaquil, Ecuador	Clay	(Brazil) Miriam D'Agostini	(Argentina) Mariana Lopez Palacios (Argentina) Romina Ottoboni	6–1, 6–4
Loss	7.	6 April 1998	ITF Viña del Mar, Chile	Clay	(Argentina) Celeste Contín	(Argentina) Melisa Arévalo (Argentina) Daniela Muscolino	3–6, 4–6
Loss	8.	4 May 1998	ITF Tampico, Mexico	Hard	(Brazil) Vanessa Menga	(United States) Adria Engel (Russia) Alina Jidkova	6–7, 5–7
Win	14.	11 May 1998	ITF Poza Rica, Mexico	Hard	(Brazil) Vanessa Menga	(United States) Adria Engel (Russia) Alina Jidkova	3–6, 6–2, 6–2
Win	15.	18 May 1998	ITF Coatzacoalcos, Mexico	Hard	(Brazil) Vanessa Menga	(United States) Adria Engel (Russia) Alina Jidkova	6–3, 6–2
Win	16.	17 August 1998	ITF Ibarra, Ecuador	Clay	(United Kingdom) Joanne Moore	(Uruguay) Elena Juricich (Peru) María Eugenia Rojas	6–3, 6–4
Win	17.	21 September 1998	ITF Santiago, Chile	Clay	(Switzerland) Aliénor Tricerri	(Argentina) Mariana Lopez Palacios (Chile) María-Alejandra Quezada	6–4, 6–1
