= Bárbara Castro =

Chilean tennis player

- Country (sports): Chile
- Born: 8 September 1975 (age 49)
- Prize money: $16,854

Singles
- Career titles: 0
- Highest ranking: No. 340 (15 July 1996)

Doubles
- Career titles: 3 ITF
- Highest ranking: No. 217 (20 May 1996)

Team competitions
- Fed Cup: 28–27

Bárbara Castro (born 8 September 1975) is a Chilean former professional tennis player.

== Biography ==
Castro trained at the Santa Rosa de Las Condes in Santiago and was later based in Spain during her career.

From 1992 to 2000, Castro featured in a total of 36 Fed Cup ties for Chile. Her doubles partnership with Paula Cabezas resulted in 15 wins, which is a national record. She has a younger sister, Valentina, who also represented Chile in Fed Cup tennis.

Castro partnered with Paula Cabezas in the women's doubles event at the 1996 Atlanta Olympics, where they lost their first round match to Hungary's Virág Csurgó and Andrea Temesvári in three sets. With the same partner, Castro won a silver medal for Chile at the 1999 Pan American Games in Winnipeg.

== ITF finals ==
=== Singles (0–1) ===
Result	No.	Date	Tournament	Surface	Opponent	Score
Loss	1.	4 May 1995	ITF Nitra, Slovakia	Clay	(Switzerland) Patty Schnyder	6–1, 2–6, 3–6

=== Doubles (3–8) ===
Result	No.	Date	Tournament	Surface	Partner	Opponents	Score
Loss	1.	2 May 1993	ITF Santiago, Chile	Clay	(Chile) María-Alejandra Quezada	(Argentina) Maria Inés Araiz (Argentina) Pamela Zingman	1–6, 4–6
Loss	2.	13 September 1993	ITF Bogotá, Colombia	Clay	(Paraguay) Magalí Benítez	(Greece) Christina Zachariadou (Ecuador) María Dolores Campana	3–6, 2–6
Loss	3.	11 October 1993	ITF Santiago, Chile	Clay	(Ecuador) María Dolores Campana	(Argentina) Paola Suárez (Argentina) Pamela Zingman	1–6, 6–3, 0–6
Loss	4.	10 October 1994	ITF Santiago, Chile	Clay	(Chile) María-Alejandra Quezada	(Argentina) Mariana Eberle (Argentina) María Fernanda Landa	3–6, 6–4, 5–7
Loss	5.	31 October 1994	ITF Freeport, Bahamas	Clay	(Chile) María-Alejandra Quezada	(United States) Ingrid Kurta (Netherlands) Martine Vosseberg	6–4, 4–6, 6–7^{(2)}
Loss	6.	7 November 1994	ITF Santo Domingo, Dominican Republic	Clay	(Chile) María-Alejandra Quezada	(Dominican Republic) Joelle Schad (Spain) Noelia Serra	1–5 ret.
Win	1.	20 November 1994	ITF San Salvador, El Salvador	Hard	(Puerto Rico) Emilie Viqueira	(United States) Kellie Dorman-Tyrone (Republic of Ireland) Philippa Palmer	6–2, 6–2
Win	2.	25 September 1995	ITF Guayaquil, Ecuador	Clay	(Chile) María-Alejandra Quezada	(Argentina) Mariana Díaz Oliva (Brazil) Eugenia Maia	7–6^{(5)}, 6–1
Loss	7.	8 October 1995	ITF Lima, Peru	Hard	(Chile) María-Alejandra Quezada	(Sweden) Maria-Farnes Capistrano (Finland) Linda Jansson	2–6, 6–2, 3–6
Loss	8.	30 October 1995	ITF Santiago, Chile	Clay	(Chile) María-Alejandra Quezada	(Brazil) Miriam D'Agostini (Brazil) Katalin Marosi	0–6, 3–6
Win	3.	6 May 1996	ITF Amazonas, Brazil	Hard	(Chile) Paula Cabezas	(Argentina) Sandra De Amelio (Argentina) Paula Racedo	6–1, 6–3
