= Colombia Billie Jean King Cup team =

Colombian national women's tennis team

Colombia
- Captain: Catalina Castaño
- ITF ranking: 28 (16 November 2015)
- Colors: blue & white
- First year: 1972
- Years played: 26
- Ties played (W–L): 102 (65–37)
- Years in World Group: 1 (1–5)
- Best finish: World Group 1R (2003)
- Most total wins: Catalina Castaño (51–23)
- Most singles wins: Catalina Castaño (33–17)
- Most doubles wins: Catalina Castaño (18–6)
- Best doubles team: Catalina Castaño / Mariana Duque Mariño (8–2)
- Most ties played: Catalina Castaño (50)
- Most years played: Catalina Castaño (15)

The Colombia women's national tennis team represents Colombia in Billie Jean King Cup tennis competition and are governed by the Federación Colombiana de Tenis. They currently compete in the Americas Zone of Group I.

== Current team (2026) ==
- Maria Paulina Perez-Garcia
- María Camila Torres Murcia
- Valentina Mediorreal
- Emiliana Arango
- Camila Osorio

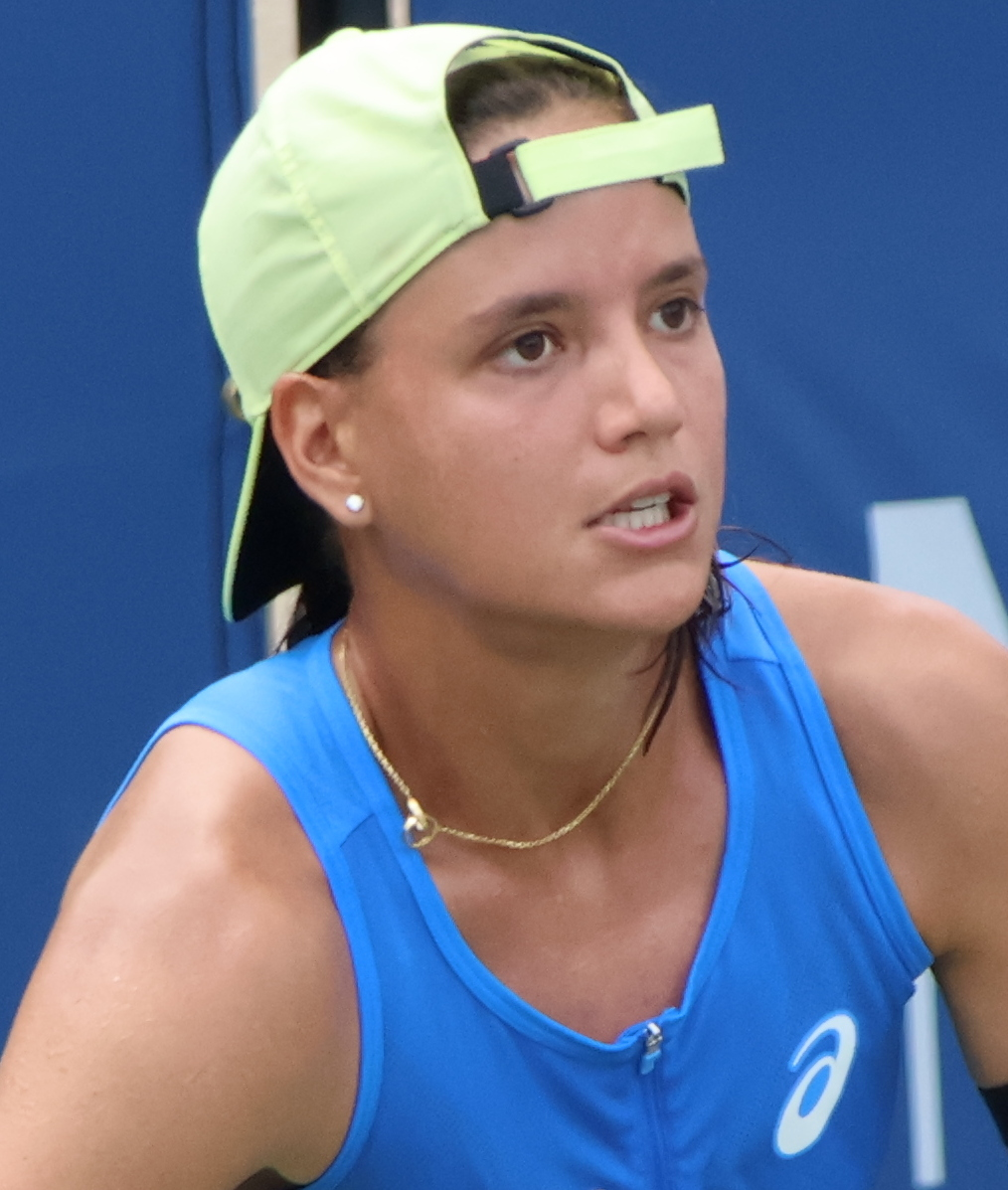
Emiliana Arango

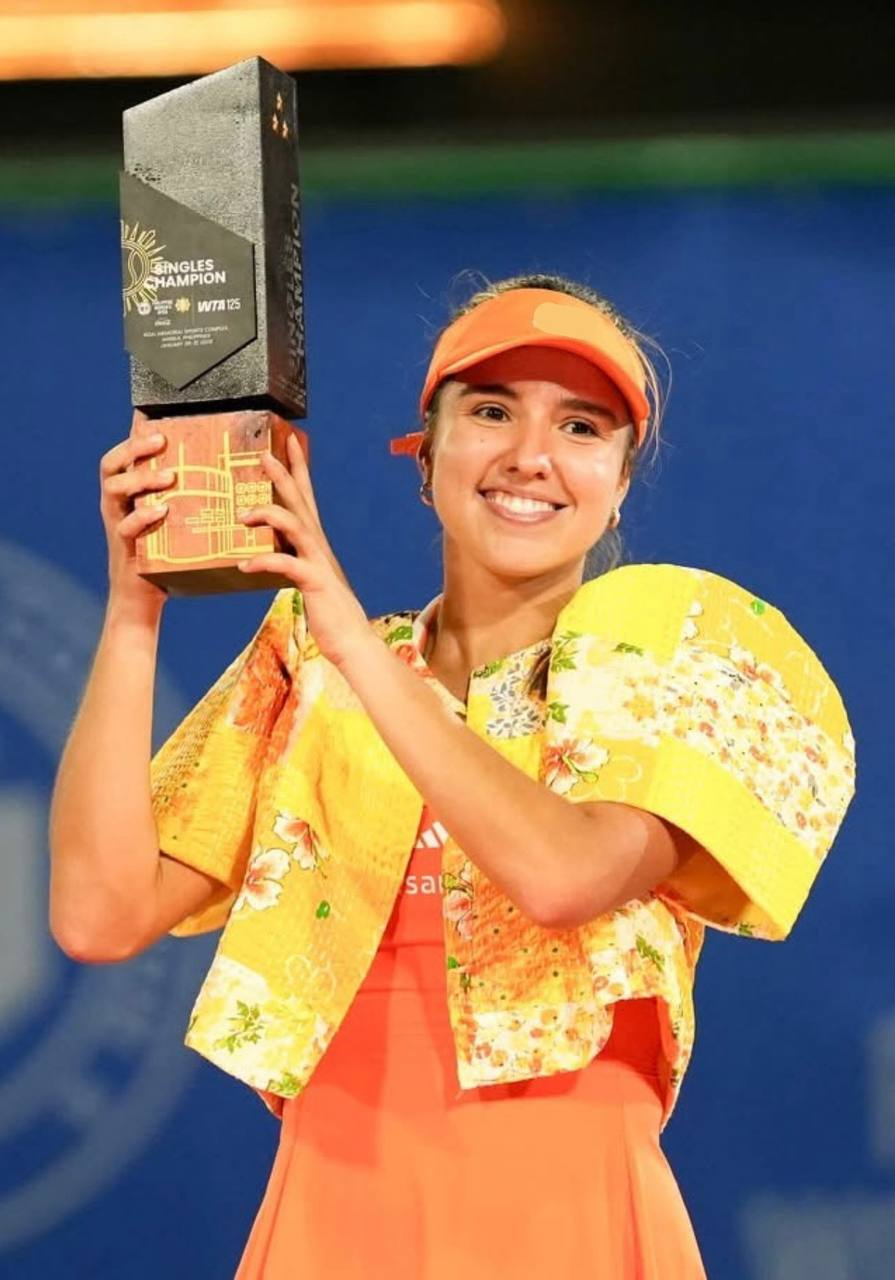
Camila Osorio

== History ==
Colombia competed in its first Fed Cup in 1972. Their best result was reaching the World Group in 1994 and 2003.

== First team (1972) ==
- María Victoria de Moggio
- María-Isabel Fernández de Soto

== See also ==
- Billie Jean King Cup
- Colombia Davis Cup team
