= 1994 Federation Cup Americas Zone – Knockout Stage =

The Knockout Stage of the 1994 Federation Cup Americas Zone was the final stage of the Zonal Competition involving teams from the Americas. Those that qualified for this stage placed first, second and third in their respective pools.

| Placing | Pool A | Pool B | Pool C | Pool D |
|---|---|---|---|---|
| 1 | Paraguay | Chile | Venezuela | Cuba |
| 2 | Peru | Ecuador | Uruguay | Bolivia |
| 3 | Costa Rica | Trinidad and Tobago | Mexico | Guatemala |
| 4 | El Salvador | Jamaica | Puerto Rico | Dominican Republic |
| 5 | | Bahamas | | |

The twelve teams were then randomly drawn into a two-stage knockout tournament, with the winners qualifying for the World Group.

== Draw ==
Semifinals
Paraguay | 3
Costa Rica | 0
Bolivia | 3
Guatemala | 0
Chile | 3
Peru | 0
Venezuela | 3
Trinidad and Tobago | 0
Cuba | 2
Ecuador | 1
Uruguay | 0
Mexico | 3

Finals
Paraguay | 3
Bolivia | 0
Chile | 2
Venezuela | 1
Cuba | 2
Mexico | 1

=== Semifinals ===
==== Paraguay vs. Costa Rica ====
Paraguay
3
Cochabamba T.C, Cochabamba, Bolivia
16 April 1994
Clay (outdoors)

Costa Rica
0

| | | | 1 | 2 | 3 |
|---|---|---|---|---|---|---|
| 1 | (Paraguay) (Costa Rica) | Larissa Schaerer; Jennifer Ligator | 6; 0 | 6; 1 |
| 2 | (Paraguay) (Costa Rica) | Rossana de los Ríos; Paula Umaña | 6; 2 | 6; 1 |
| 3 | (Paraguay) (Costa Rica) | Magalí Benítez / Larissa Schaerer; Melissa Golfin / Paula Umaña | 4; 1 | | | retired |

==== Bolivia vs. Guatemala ====
Bolivia
3
Cochabamba T.C, Cochabamba, Bolivia
16 April 1994
Clay (outdoors)

Guatemala
0

| | | | 1 | 2 | 3 |
|---|---|---|---|---|---|
| 1 | (Bolivia) (Guatemala) | Carla Jiménez; Florea de María Urrea | 6; 1 | 6; 4 |
| 2 | (Bolivia) (Guatemala) | Cecilia Ampuero; Alejandra Gómez | 6; 1 | 6; 0 |
| 3 | (Bolivia) (Guatemala) | Cecilia Ampuero / Sandra Kellemberger; Alejandra Gómez / Florea de María Urrea | 6; 4 | 6; 5 |

==== Chile vs. Peru ====
Chile
3
Cochabamba T.C, Cochabamba, Bolivia
16 April 1994
Clay (outdoors)

Peru
0

| | | | 1 | 2 | 3 |
|---|---|---|---|---|---|
| 1 | (Chile) (Peru) | Bárbara Castro; Déborah Gaviria | 6; 1 | 7; 5 |
| 2 | (Chile) (Peru) | Paula Cabezas; Gianfranca Devercelli | 6; 3 | 7; 5 |
| 3 | (Chile) (Peru) | Paula Cabezas / Bárbara Castro; Gianfranca Devercelli / Mónica Rebolledo | 7; 5 | 6; 4 |

==== Venezuela vs. Trinidad and Tobago ====
Venezuela
3
Cochabamba T.C, Cochabamba, Bolivia
16 April 1994
Clay (outdoors)

Trinidad and Tobago
0

| | | | 1 | 2 | 3 |
|---|---|---|---|---|---|
| 1 | (Venezuela) (Trinidad and Tobago) | María Virginia Francesa; Kaisaran Siewrattan | 6; 1 | 6; 1 |
| 2 | (Venezuela) (Trinidad and Tobago) | Ninfa Marra; Elizabeth Gibson | 7; 5 | 6; 2 |
| 3 | (Venezuela) (Trinidad and Tobago) | María Virginia Francesa / Ninfa Marra; Beverly Corbie / Elizabeth Gibson | 6; 4 | 6; 0 |

==== Cuba vs. Ecuador ====
Cuba
2
Cochabamba T.C, Cochabamba, Bolivia
16 April 1994
Clay (outdoors)

Ecuador
1

| | | | 1 | 2 | 3 |
|---|---|---|---|---|---|
| 1 | (Cuba) (Ecuador) | Yoannis Montesino; Alexandra Guzmán | 6; 2 | 1; 6 | 6; 3 |
| 2 | (Cuba) (Ecuador) | Belkis Rodríguez; María Dolores Campana | 2; 6 | 5; 7 |
| 3 | (Cuba) (Ecuador) | Yoannis Montesino / Belkis Rodríguez; María Dolores Campana / Nuria Niemes | 6; 4 | 3; 6 | 6; 1 |

==== Uruguay vs. Mexico ====
Uruguay
0
Cochabamba T.C, Cochabamba, Bolivia
16 April 1994
Clay (outdoors)

Mexico
3

| | | | 1 | 2 | 3 |
|---|---|---|---|---|---|
| 1 | (Uruguay) (Mexico) | Elena Juricich; Graciela Vélez | 2; 6 | 1; 6 |
| 2 | (Uruguay) (Mexico) | Claudia Brause; Karin Palme | 4; 6 | 3; 6 |
| 3 | (Uruguay) (Mexico) | Claudia Brause / Elena Juricich; Claudia Muciño / Graciela Vélez | 3; 6 | 1; 6 |

=== Finals ===
==== Paraguay vs. Bolivia ====
Paraguay
3
Cochabamba T.C, Cochabamba, Bolivia
17 April 1994
Clay (outdoors)

Bolivia
0

| | | | 1 | 2 | 3 |
|---|---|---|---|---|---|
| 1 | (Paraguay) (Bolivia) | Larissa Schaerer; Carla Jiménez | 6; 0 | 6; 2 |
| 2 | (Paraguay) (Bolivia) | Rossana de los Ríos; Cecilia Ampuero | 6; 4 | 6; 2 |
| 3 | (Paraguay) (Bolivia) | Magalí Benítez / Larissa Schaerer; Cecilia Ampuero / Sandra Kellemberger | 6; 4 | 6; 1 |

==== Chile vs. Venezuela ====
Chile
2
Cochabamba T.C, Cochabamba, Bolivia
17 April 1994
Clay (outdoors)

Venezuela
1

| | | | 1 | 2 | 3 |
|---|---|---|---|---|---|
| 1 | (Chile) (Venezuela) | Bárbara Castro; María Virginia Francesa | 3; 6 | 1; 6 |
| 2 | (Chile) (Venezuela) | Paula Cabezas; Ninfa Marra | 6; 3 | 6; 2 |
| 3 | (Chile) (Venezuela) | Paula Cabezas / Bárbara Castro; María Virginia Francesa / Ninfa Marra | 7; 5 | 6; 3 |

==== Cuba vs. Mexico ====
Cuba
2
Cochabamba T.C, Cochabamba, Bolivia
16 April 1994
Clay (outdoors)

Mexico
1

| | | | 1 | 2 | 3 |
|---|---|---|---|---|---|
| 1 | (Cuba) (Mexico) | Yoannis Montesino; Graciela Vélez | 5; 7 | 6; 1 | 6; 0 |
| 2 | (Cuba) (Mexico) | Belkis Rodríguez; Karin Palme | 5; 7 | 2; 6 |
| 3 | (Cuba) (Mexico) | Yoannis Montesino / Belkis Rodríguez; Claudia Muciño / Graciela Vélez | 6; 2 | 6; 4 |

- Paraguay, Chile and Cuba advanced to the World Group, where they were defeated in the first round by South Africa, 3–0, Spain, 3–0, and Argentina, 3–0, respectively.

== See also ==
- Fed Cup structure
