= 1992 Federation Cup Americas Zone – Knockout Stage =

The Knockout Stage of the 1992 Federation Cup Americas Zone was the final stage of the Zonal Competition involving teams from the Americas. Those that qualified for this stage placed first and second in their respective pools.

Placing	Pool A	Pool B	Pool C	Pool D
1	Mexico	Brazil	Cuba	Chile
2	Uruguay	Ecuador	Colombia	Venezuela
3	Trinidad and Tobago	Puerto Rico	Bolivia	Costa Rica
4	El Salvador	Guatemala	Dominican Republic	Jamaica

The eight teams were then randomly drawn into a two-stage knockout tournament, with the winners qualifying for the World Group.

== Draw ==
Semifinals
Mexico	3
Ecuador	0
Colombia	0
Venezuela	3
Brazil	3
Uruguay	0
Cuba	0
Chile	3

Finals
Mexico	3
Venezuela	0
Brazil	1
Chile	2

=== Semifinals ===
==== Mexico vs. Ecuador ====
Mexico
3
Atlas Colomos T.C, Guadalajara, Mexico
24 April 1992
Clay (outdoors)

Ecuador
0

			1	2	3
1	(Mexico) (Ecuador)	Isabela Petrov; Nuria Niemes	6; 1	6; 2
2	(Mexico) (Ecuador)	Angélica Gavaldón; María Dolores Campana	6; 0	6; 0
3	(Mexico) (Ecuador)	Angélica Gavaldón / Lupita Novelo; María Dolores Campana / Nuria Niemes	6; 4	6; 3

==== Colombia vs. Venezuela ====
Colombia
0
Atlas Colomos T.C, Guadalajara, Mexico
24 April 1992
Clay (outdoors)

Venezuela
3

			1	2	3
1	(Colombia) (Venezuela)	Giana Gutiérrez; Ninfa Marra	5; 7	6; 4	5; 7
2	(Colombia) (Venezuela)	Carolina Torres; Eleonora Vegliante	2; 6	3; 6
3	(Colombia) (Venezuela)	Carmiña Giraldo / Giana Gutiérrez; Helene Kappler / Eleonora Vegliante	4; 6	0; 6

==== Brazil vs. Uruguay ====
Brazil
3
Atlas Colomos T.C, Guadalajara, Mexico
24 April 1992
Clay (outdoors)

Uruguay
0

			1	2	3
1	(Brazil) (Uruguay)	Luciana Tella; Claudia Brause	6; 3	6; 3
2	(Brazil) (Uruguay)	Andrea Vieira; Laura Olave	7; 5	6; 2
3	(Brazil) (Uruguay)	Stephanie Mayorkis / Luciana Tella; Natalia de Cola / Laura Olave	6; 2	6; 3

==== Cuba vs. Chile ====
Cuba
0
Atlas Colomos T.C, Guadalajara, Mexico
24 April 1992
Clay (outdoors)

Chile
3

			1	2	3
1	(Cuba) (Chile)	Belkis Rodríguez; Paulina Sepúlveda	0; 6	2; 6
2	(Cuba) (Chile)	Rita Pichardo; Paula Cabezas	4; 6	3; 6
3	(Cuba) (Chile)	Rita Pichardo / Belkis Rodríguez; Paula Cabezas / Paulina Sepúlveda	2; 6	7; 5	5; 7

=== Finals ===
==== Mexico vs. Venezuela ====
Mexico
3
Atlas Colomos T.C, Guadalajara, Mexico
25 April 1992
Clay (outdoors)

Venezuela
0

			1	2	3
1	(Mexico) (Venezuela)	Isabela Petrov; Eleonora Vegliante	6; 0	6; 1
2	(Mexico) (Venezuela)	Angélica Gavaldón; Helene Kappler	6; 4	6; 2
3	(Mexico) (Venezuela)	Angélica Gavaldón / Lupita Novelo; Helene Kappler / Eleonora Vegliante	5; 7	6; 1	6; 2

==== Brazil vs. Chile ====
Brazil
1
Atlas Colomos T.C, Guadalajara, Mexico
25 April 1992
Clay (outdoors)

Chile
2

			1	2	3
1	(Brazil) (Chile)	Luciana Tella; Paulina Sepúlveda	6; 4	7; 5
2	(Brazil) (Chile)	Andrea Vieira; Paula Cabezas	0; 6	3; 6
3	(Brazil) (Chile)	Luciana Tella / Andrea Vieira; Paula Cabezas / Paulina Sepúlveda	3; 6	3; 6

- Mexico and Chile advanced to the World Group, where they were defeated in the first round by Argentina, 3–0, and Denmark, 2–1, respectively.

== See also ==
- Fed Cup structure
