= 1997 Fed Cup Americas Zone Group I – Pool A =

International tennis competition

Group A of the 1997 Fed Cup Americas Zone Group I was one of two pools in the Americas Zone Group I of the 1997 Fed Cup. Five teams competed in a round robin competition, with the top two teams advancing to the knockout stage, and the bottom team being relegated down to 1998 Group II.

	(Canada) CAN	(Brazil) BRA	(Ecuador) ECU	(Mexico) MEX	RR; W–L	Set; W–L	Game; W–L	Standings
Canada		3–0	3–0	3–0	3–0	18–2	120–59	1
Brazil	0–3		3–0	2–1	2–1	11–8	84–74	2
Ecuador	0–3	0–3		2–1	1–2	6–15	67–109	3
Mexico	0–3	1–2	1–2		0–3	5–15	72–138	4

== Canada vs. Ecuador ==
Canada
3
Club Palestino, Santiago, Chile
29 April 1997
Red clay (outdoors)

Ecuador
0

			1	2	3
1	(Canada) (Ecuador)	Sonya Jeyaseelan; Candice de la Torre	6; 4	6; 2
2	(Canada) (Ecuador)	Rene Simpson; María Dolores Campana	6; 1	6^{7} 7^{9}	6; 1
3	(Canada) (Ecuador)	Patricia Hy / Rene Simpson; Candice de la Torre / Nuria Niemes	6; 2	6; 0

== Brazil vs. Mexico ==
Brazil
2
Club Palestino, Santiago, Chile
29 April 1997
Red clay (outdoors)

Mexico
1

			1	2	3
1	(Brazil) (Mexico)	Eugenia Maia; Lucila Becerra	6; 0	6; 4
2	(Brazil) (Mexico)	Vanessa Menga; Karin Palme	2; 6	1; 6
3	(Brazil) (Mexico)	Vanessa Menga / Luciana Tella; Lucila Becerra / Graciela Vélez	6; 4	6; 0

== Canada vs. Brazil ==
Canada
3
Club Palestino, Santiago, Chile
30 April 1997
Red clay (outdoors)

Brazil
0

			1	2	3
1	(Canada) (Brazil)	Rene Simpson; Eugenia Maia	6; 2	6; 0
2	(Canada) (Brazil)	Patricia Hy; Vanessa Menga	6; 2	3; 6	6; 4
3	(Canada) (Brazil)	Sonya Jeyaseelan / Rene Simpson; Vanessa Menga / Luciana Tella	6; 1	7; 5

== Ecuador vs. Mexico ==
Ecuador
2
Club Palestino, Santiago, Chile
30 April 1997
Red clay (outdoors)

Mexico
1

			1	2	3
1	(Ecuador) (Mexico)	Alexandra Guzmán; Karin Palme	1; 6	7^{7} 6^{4}	1; 6
2	(Ecuador) (Mexico)	María Dolores Campana; Angélica Gavaldón	6; 1	6; 1
3	(Ecuador) (Mexico)	María Dolores Campana / Nuria Niemes; Lucila Becerra / Graciela Vélez	6; 2	3; 6	6; 2

== Canada vs. Mexico ==
Canada
3
Club Palestino, Santiago, Chile
2 May 1997
Red clay (outdoors)

Mexico
0

			1	2	3
1	(Canada) (Mexico)	Rene Simpson; Karin Palme	6; 3	6; 3
2	(Canada) (Mexico)	Patricia Hy; Angélica Gavaldón	7^{7} 6^{1}	7; 5
3	(Canada) (Mexico)	Patricia Hy / Sonya Jeyaseelan; Lucila Becerra / Karin Palme	6; 4	6; 1

== Brazil vs. Ecuador ==
Brazil
3
Club Palestino, Santiago, Chile
2 May 1997
Red clay (outdoors)

Ecuador
0

			1	2	3
1	(Brazil) (Ecuador)	Eugenia Maia; Candice de la Torre	6; 2	6; 2
2	(Brazil) (Ecuador)	Vanessa Menga; María Dolores Campana	6; 3	6; 2
3	(Brazil) (Ecuador)	Joana Cortez / Vanessa Menga; Alexandra Guzmán / Nuria Niemes	7; 5	6; 0

- Mexico placed last in the pool, and thus was relegated to Group II in 1998, where they placed first in their pool of eight and as such advanced back to Group I for 1998.

== See also ==
- Fed Cup structure
