= 1994 Federation Cup Americas Zone =

Subsection of tennis competition

The Americas Zone was one of three zones of regional Federation Cup qualifying competition in 1994. All ties were played at the Cochabamba T.C. in Cochabamba, Bolivia on clay courts.

The seventeen teams were divided into three pools of four and one pool of five to compete in round-robin matches. After each of the ties had been played, the teams that finished first, second and third in each of the respective pools would then move on to the knockout stage of the competition. The two teams that won two matches of the knockout stage would go on to advance to the World Group.

== Pool Stage ==
- Date: April 11–15

	Pool A	PAR	PER	CRC	ESA
1	Paraguay (3–0)		3–0	3–0	3–0
2	Peru (2–1)	0–3		3–0	3–0
3	Costa Rica (1–2)	0–3	0–3		2–1
4	El Salvador (0–3)	0–3	0–3	1–2	

	Pool B	CHI	ECU	TRI	JAM	BAH
1	Chile (4–0)		2–1	2–1	w/o	3–0
2	Ecuador (3–1)	1–2		2–1	3–0	3–0
3	Trinidad and Tobago (2–2)	0–3	1–2		w/o	2–1
4	Jamaica (1–3)	w/o	0–3	w/o		2–1
5	Bahamas (0–4)	0–3	0–3	1–2	1–2	

	Pool C	VEN	URU	MEX	PUR
1	Venezuela (3–0)		2–1	2–1	3–0
2	Uruguay (1–2)	1–2		2–1	2–1
3	Mexico (1–2)	1–2	1–2		2–1
4	Puerto Rico (1–2)	0–3	1–2	1–2	

	Pool D	CUB	BOL	GUA	DOM
1	Cuba (3–0)		2–1	3–0	3–0
2	Bolivia (2–1)	1–2		3–0	3–0
3	Guatemala (1–2)	0–3	0–3		3–0
4	Dominican Republic (0–3)	0–3	0–3	0–3	

== Knockout stage ==
Semifinals
Paraguay	3
Costa Rica	0
Bolivia	3
Guatemala	0
Chile	3
Peru	0
Venezuela	3
Trinidad and Tobago	0
Cuba	2
Ecuador	1
Uruguay	0
Mexico	3

Finals
Paraguay	3
Bolivia	0
Chile	2
Venezuela	1
Cuba	2
Mexico	1

- Chile, Cuba and Paraguay advanced to World Group.

== See also ==
- Fed Cup structure
