= 1992 Federation Cup Americas Zone =

Subsection of tennis competition

The Americas Zone was one of three zones of regional Federation Cup qualifying competition in 1992. All ties were played at the Atlas Colomos T.C. in Guadalajara, Mexico on clay courts.

The sixteen teams were divided into four pools of four to compete in round-robin matches. After each of the ties had been played, the eight teams that finished first and second in each of the respective pools would then move on to the two-round knockout stage of the competition. The two teams that won two matches of the knockout stage would go on to advance to the World Group.

== Pool Stage ==
Date: 21–23 April

| | Pool A | MEX | URU | TRI | ESA |
| 1 | Mexico (3–0) | | 3–0 | 3–0 | 3–0 |
| 2 | Uruguay (2–1) | 0–3 | | 3–0 | 3–0 |
| 3 | Trinidad and Tobago (1–2) | 0–3 | 0–3 | | 3–0 |
| 4 | El Salvador (0–3) | 0–3 | 0–3 | 0–3 | |

| | Pool B | BRA | ECU | PUR | GUA |
| 1 | Brazil (3–0) | | 3–0 | 3–0 | 3–0 |
| 2 | Ecuador (2–1) | 0–3 | | 2–1 | 3–0 |
| 3 | Puerto Rico (1–2) | 0–3 | 1–2 | | 3–0 |
| 4 | Guatemala (0–3) | 0–3 | 0–3 | 0–3 | |

| | Pool C | CUB | COL | BOL | DOM |
| 1 | Cuba (3–0) | | 3–0 | 2–0 | 3–0 |
| 2 | Colombia (2–1) | 0–3 | | 2–1 | 3–0 |
| 3 | Bolivia (1–2) | 0–2 | 1–2 | | 3–0 |
| 4 | Dominican Republic (0–3) | 0–3 | 0–3 | 0–3 | |

| | Pool D | CHI | VEN | CRC | JAM |
| 1 | Chile (3–0) | | 3–0 | 3–0 | 3–0 |
| 2 | Venezuela (2–1) | 0–3 | | 3–0 | 3–0 |
| 3 | Costa Rica (1–2) | 0–3 | 0–3 | | 2–1 |
| 4 | Jamaica (0–3) | 0–3 | 0–3 | 1–2 | |

== Knockout stage ==
Semifinals
Mexico | 3
Ecuador | 0
Colombia | 0
Venezuela | 3
Brazil | 3
Uruguay | 0
Chile | 3
Cuba | 0

Finals
Mexico | 3
Venezuela | 0
Brazil | 1
Chile | 2

- Chile and Mexico advanced to World Group.

== See also ==
- Fed Cup structure
