= 1992 Federation Cup Americas Zone – Pool D =

Group D of the 1992 Federation Cup Americas Zone was one of four pools in the Americas zone of the 1992 Federation Cup. Four teams competed in a round robin competition, with the top two teams advancing to the knockout stage..

	(Chile) CHI	(Venezuela) VEN	(Costa Rica) CRC	(Jamaica) JAM	RR; W–L	Set; W–L	Game; W–L	Standings
Chile		3–0	3–0	3–0	3–0	18–1	118–47	1
Venezuela	0–3		3–0	3–0	2–1	13–7	103–66	2
Costa Rica	0–3	0–3		2–1	1–2	5–16	69–119	3
Jamaica	0–3	0–3	1–2		0–3	4–16	56–114	4

== Chile vs. Costa Rica ==
Chile
3
Atlas Colomos T.C, Guadalajara, Mexico
21 April 1992
Clay (outdoors)

Costa Rica
0

			1	2	3
1	(Chile) (Costa Rica)	Paulina Sepúlveda; Karla Golfin	6; 0	6; 1
2	(Chile) (Costa Rica)	Paula Cabezas; Paula Umaña	6; 2	6; 2
3	(Chile) (Costa Rica)	Paula Cabezas / Paulina Sepúlveda; Karla Golfin / Paula Umaña	6; 1	4; 6	6; 1

== Venezuela vs. Jamaica ==
Venezuela
3
Atlas Colomos T.C, Guadalajara, Mexico
21 April 1992
Clay (outdoors)

Jamaica
0

			1	2	3
1	(Venezuela) (Jamaica)	Ninfa Marra; Henrietta Harris	6; 1	6; 0
2	(Venezuela) (Jamaica)	Eleonora Vegliante; Joni Van Ryck De Groot	6; 0	6; 2
3	(Venezuela) (Jamaica)	Helene Kappler / Eleonora Vegliante; Henrietta Harris / Joni Van Ryck De Groot	6; 2	7; 5

== Chile vs. Venezuela ==
Chile
3
Atlas Colomos T.C, Guadalajara, Mexico
22 April 1992
Clay (outdoors)

Venezuela
0

			1	2	3
1	(Chile) (Venezuela)	Paulina Sepúlveda; Ninfa Marra	6; 3	6; 3
2	(Chile) (Venezuela)	Paula Cabezas; Eleonora Vegliante	7^{7} 6^{2}	6; 2
3	(Chile) (Venezuela)	Paula Cabezas / Paulina Sepúlveda; Helene Kappler / Eleonora Vegliante	6; 2	5; 7	6; 4

== Costa Rica vs. Jamaica ==
Costa Rica
2
Atlas Colomos T.C, Guadalajara, Mexico
22 April 1992
Clay (outdoors)

Jamaica
1

			1	2	3
1	(Costa Rica) (Jamaica)	Melissa Golfin; Sasha Hanna	4; 6	3; 6
2	(Costa Rica) (Jamaica)	Karla Golfin; Joni Van Ryck De Groot	6^{4} 7^{7}	6; 3	6; 4
3	(Costa Rica) (Jamaica)	Karla Golfin / Paula Umaña; Henrietta Harris / Joni Van Ryck De Groot	6; 2	4; 6	7; 5

== Chile vs. Jamaica ==
Chile
3
Atlas Colomos T.C, Guadalajara, Mexico
23 April 1992
Clay (outdoors)

Jamaica
0

			1	2	3
1	(Chile) (Jamaica)	Marlene Zuleta; Sasha Hanna	6; 2	6; 0
2	(Chile) (Jamaica)	Paula Cabezas; Joni Van Ryck De Groot	6; 2	6; 1
3	(Chile) (Jamaica)	Paula Cabezas / Paulina Sepúlveda; Henrietta Harris / Joni Van Ryck De Groot	6; 1	6; 1

== Venezuela vs. Costa Rica ==
Venezuela
3
Atlas Colomos T.C, Guadalajara, Mexico
23 April 1992
Clay (outdoors)

Costa Rica
0

			1	2	3
1	(Venezuela) (Costa Rica)	Ninfa Marra; Karla Golfin	4; 6	6; 4	6; 4
2	(Venezuela) (Costa Rica)	Eleonora Vegliante; Paula Umaña	6; 0	6; 0
3	(Venezuela) (Costa Rica)	Helene Kappler / Eleonora Vegliante; Paula Umaña / Sara Valverde	6; 0	7; 0

== See also ==
- Fed Cup structure
