= 1994 Federation Cup Americas Zone – Pool C =

Group A of the 1994 Federation Cup Americas Zone was one of four pools in the Americas zone of the 1994 Federation Cup. Four teams competed in a round robin competition, with the top three teams advancing to the knockout stage.

	(Venezuela) VEN	(Uruguay) URU	(Mexico) MEX	(Puerto Rico) PUR	RR; W–L	Set; W–L	Game; W–L	Standings
Venezuela		2–1	2–1	3–0	3–0	14–5	107–83	1
Uruguay	1–2		2–1	2–1	2–1	12–9	105–113	2
Mexico	1–2	1–2		2–1	1–2	9–11	96–92	3
Puerto Rico	0–3	1–2	1–2		0–3	6–15	96–116	4

== Venezuela vs. Uruguay ==
Venezuela
2
Cochabamba T.C, Cochabamba, Bolivia
11 April 1994
Clay (outdoors)

Uruguay
1

			1	2	3
1	(Venezuela) (Uruguay)	María Virginia Francesa; María Eugenia Fernández	6; 2	6; 2
2	(Venezuela) (Uruguay)	Ninfa Marra; Claudia Brause	4; 6	5; 7
3	(Venezuela) (Uruguay)	María Virginia Francesa / Ninfa Marra; Claudia Brause / María Eugenia Fernández	7^{7} 6^{1}	6; 1

== Mexico vs. Puerto Rico ==
Mexico
2
Cochabamba T.C, Cochabamba, Bolivia
11 April 1994
Clay (outdoors)

Puerto Rico
1

			1	2	3
1	(Mexico) (Puerto Rico)	Graciela Vélez; Maribel Amadeo	6; 1	6; 4
2	(Mexico) (Puerto Rico)	Karin Palme; Emilie Viqueira	3; 6	5; 7
3	(Mexico) (Puerto Rico)	Claudia Muciño / Graciela Vélez; Brenda Santos / Emilie Viqueira	6; 4	6; 1

== Venezuela vs. Puerto Rico ==
Venezuela
3
Cochabamba T.C, Cochabamba, Bolivia
12 April 1994
Clay (outdoors)

Puerto Rico
0

			1	2	3
1	(Venezuela) (Puerto Rico)	María Virginia Francesa; Maribel Amadeo	7^{7} 6^{2}	7^{7} 6^{4}
2	(Venezuela) (Puerto Rico)	Ninfa Marra; Emilie Viqueira	7^{7} 6^{4}	6; 1
3	(Venezuela) (Puerto Rico)	María Virginia Francesa / Ninfa Marra; Brenda Santos / Jenny Sotomayor	6; 1	6; 4

== Uruguay vs. Mexico ==
Uruguay
2
Cochabamba T.C, Cochabamba, Bolivia
12 April 1994
Clay (outdoors)

Mexico
1

			1	2	3
1	(Uruguay) (Mexico)	María Eugenia Fernández; Graciela Vélez	6; 2	2; 6	3; 6
2	(Uruguay) (Mexico)	Claudia Brause; Karin Palme	6; 4	6; 4
3	(Uruguay) (Mexico)	Claudia Brause / María Eugenia Fernández; Claudia Muciño / Graciela Vélez	6; 4	6; 4

== Venezuela vs. Mexico ==
Venezuela
2
Cochabamba T.C, Cochabamba, Bolivia
13 April 1994
Clay (outdoors)

Mexico
1

			1	2	3
1	(Venezuela) (Mexico)	María Virginia Francesa; Graciela Vélez	3; 6	6; 4	6; 2
2	(Venezuela) (Mexico)	Ninfa Marra; Karin Palme	4; 6	2; 6
3	(Venezuela) (Mexico)	María Virginia Francesa / Ninfa Marra; Claudia Muciño / Graciela Vélez	6; 4	7^{7} 6^{5}

== Uruguay vs. Puerto Rico ==
Uruguay
2
Cochabamba T.C, Cochabamba, Bolivia
13 April 1994
Clay (outdoors)

Puerto Rico
1

			1	2	3
1	(Uruguay) (Puerto Rico)	María Eugenia Fernández; Maribel Amadeo	1; 6	6; 3	9; 7
2	(Uruguay) (Puerto Rico)	Claudia Brause; Emilie Viqueira	6; 3	4; 6	3; 6
3	(Uruguay) (Puerto Rico)	Claudia Brause / María Eugenia Fernández; Jenny Sotomayor / Emilie Viqueira	2; 6	7^{7} 6^{3}	7; 5

== See also ==
- Fed Cup structure
