= 1992 Federation Cup Americas Zone – Pool B =

Group B of the 1992 Federation Cup Americas Zone was one of four pools in the Americas zone of the 1992 Federation Cup. Four teams competed in a round robin competition, with the top two teams advancing to the knockout stage.

	(Brazil) BRA	(Ecuador) ECU	(Puerto Rico) PUR	(Guatemala) GUA	RR; W–L	Set; W–L	Game; W–L	Standings
Brazil		3–0	3–0	3–0	3–0	18–2	116–52	1
Ecuador	0–3		2–1	3–0	2–1	11–9	83–93	2
Puerto Rico	0–3	1–2		3–0	1–2	10–8	81–84	3
Guatemala	0–3	0–3	0–3		0–3	2–18	54–117	4

== Brazil vs. Ecuador ==
Brazil
3
Atlas Colomos T.C, Guadalajara, Mexico
21 April 1992
Clay (outdoors)

Ecuador
0

			1	2	3
1	(Brazil) (Ecuador)	Stephanie Mayorkis; María de los Ángeles Ycaza	6; 1	6; 0
2	(Brazil) (Ecuador)	Andrea Vieira; María Dolores Campana	3; 6	6; 3	6; 4
3	(Brazil) (Ecuador)	Luciana Tella / Andrea Vieira; María Dolores Campana / Nuria Niemes	6; 3	6; 2

== Puerto Rico vs. Guatemala ==
Puerto Rico
3
Atlas Colomos T.C, Guadalajara, Mexico
21 April 1992
Clay (outdoors)

Guatemala
0

			1	2	3
1	(Puerto Rico) (Guatemala)	Maribel Amadeo; Mónica Agüero	6; 4	6; 1
2	(Puerto Rico) (Guatemala)	Emilie Viqueira; Saira Sanchinelli	6; 0	6; 3
3	(Puerto Rico) (Guatemala)	Maribel Amadeo / Emilie Viqueira; Mónica Agüero / Florea de María Urrea	6; 2	6; 4

== Brazil vs. Puerto Rico ==
Brazil
3
Atlas Colomos T.C, Guadalajara, Mexico
22 April 1992
Clay (outdoors)

Puerto Rico
0

			1	2	3
1	(Brazil) (Puerto Rico)	Luciana Tella; Maribel Amadeo	6; 1	6; 4
2	(Brazil) (Puerto Rico)	Andrea Vieira; Emilie Viqueira	7^{7} 6^{1}	6; 3
3	(Brazil) (Puerto Rico)	Stephanie Mayorkis / Luciana Tella; Joanne Bauzà / Beatriz Luna	6; 3	6; 1

== Ecuador vs. Guatemala ==
Ecuador
3
Atlas Colomos T.C, Guadalajara, Mexico
22 April 1992
Clay (outdoors)

Guatemala
0

			1	2	3
1	(Ecuador) (Guatemala)	María de los Ángeles Ycaza; Mónica Agüero	6; 3	6; 2
2	(Ecuador) (Guatemala)	María Dolores Campana; Saira Sanchinelli	3; 6	7; 5	6; 1
3	(Ecuador) (Guatemala)	Nuria Niemes / María de los Ángeles Ycaza; Mónica Agüero / Florea de María Urrea	6; 3	7; 5

== Brazil vs. Guatemala ==
Brazil
3
Atlas Colomos T.C, Guadalajara, Mexico
23 April 1992
Clay (outdoors)

Guatemala
0

			1	2	3
1	(Brazil) (Guatemala)	Luciana Tella; Mónica Agüero	6; 0	6; 2
2	(Brazil) (Guatemala)	Stephanie Mayorkis; Saira Sanchinelli	4; 6	6; 4	6; 2
3	(Brazil) (Guatemala)	Luciana Tella / Andrea Vieira; Mónica Agüero / Saira Sanchinelli	6; 1	6; 0

== Ecuador vs. Puerto Rico ==
Ecuador
2
Atlas Colomos T.C, Guadalajara, Mexico
23 April 1992
Clay (outdoors)

Puerto Rico
1

			1	2	3
1	(Ecuador) (Puerto Rico)	Nuria Niemes; Maribel Amadeo	7^{7} 6^{3}	6; 3
2	(Ecuador) (Puerto Rico)	María Dolores Campana; Emilie Viqueira	3; 6	5; 7
3	(Ecuador) (Puerto Rico)	María Dolores Campana / Nuria Niemes; Maribel Amadeo / Emilie Viqueira	6; 2	6; 3

== See also ==
- Fed Cup structure
