= Jessica Fernandez =

Jessica Fernandez may refer to:

- Jessica Fernández (born 1979), Mexican professional tennis player
- Jessica Fernandez, finalist in So You Think You Can Dance (U.S. season 2)
