= 1994 Federation Cup Americas Zone – Pool A =

International tennis competition

Group A of the 1994 Federation Cup Americas Zone was one of four pools in the Americas zone of the 1994 Federation Cup. Four teams competed in a round robin competition, with the top three teams advancing to the knockout stage.

	(Paraguay) PAR	(Peru) PER	(Costa Rica) CRC	(El Salvador) ESA	RR; W–L	Set; W–L	Game; W–L	Standings
Paraguay		3–0	3–0	3–0	3–0	18–0	109–34	1
Peru	0–3		3–0	3–0	2–1	12–7	78–73	2
Costa Rica	0–3	0–3		2–1	1–2	6–15	72–111	3
El Salvador	0–3	0–3	1–2		0–3	3–17	61–122	4

== Paraguay vs. Costa Rica ==
Paraguay
3
Cochabamba T.C, Cochabamba, Bolivia
11 April 1994
Clay (outdoors)

Costa Rica
0

			1	2	3
1	(Paraguay) (Costa Rica)	Larissa Schaerer; Jennifer Ligator	6; 1	6; 1
2	(Paraguay) (Costa Rica)	Rossana de los Ríos; Paula Umaña	7; 5	6; 4
3	(Paraguay) (Costa Rica)	Magalí Benítez / Larissa Schaerer; Melissa Golfin / Paula Umaña	6; 1	6; 2

== Peru vs. El Salvador ==
Peru
3
Cochabamba T.C, Cochabamba, Bolivia
11 April 1994
Clay (outdoors)

El Salvador
0

			1	2	3
1	(Peru) (El Salvador)	Déborah Gaviria; Renate Wachtler	6; 1	6; 3
2	(Peru) (El Salvador)	Gianfranca Devercelli; Ingrid González	6; 2	6; 4
3	(Peru) (El Salvador)	Gianfranca Devercelli / Déborah Gaviria; Ingrid González / Renate Wachtler	6; 1	6; 3

== Paraguay vs. El Salvador ==
Paraguay
3
Cochabamba T.C, Cochabamba, Bolivia
12 April 1994
Clay (outdoors)

El Salvador
0

			1	2	3
1	(Paraguay) (El Salvador)	Larissa Schaerer; Renate Wachtler	6; 3	6; 2
2	(Paraguay) (El Salvador)	Rossana de los Ríos; Ingrid González	6; 3	6; 0
3	(Paraguay) (El Salvador)	Magalí Benítez / Larissa Schaerer; Ingrid González / Renate Wachtler	6; 2	6; 0

== Peru vs. Costa Rica ==
Peru
3
Cochabamba T.C, Cochabamba, Bolivia
12 April 1994
Clay (outdoors)

Costa Rica
0

			1	2	3
1	(Peru) (Costa Rica)	Déborah Gaviria; Melissa Golfin	6; 1	6; 2
2	(Peru) (Costa Rica)	Gianfranca Devercelli; Paula Umaña	6; 2	1; 6	7; 5
3	(Peru) (Costa Rica)	Gianfranca Devercelli / Déborah Gaviria; Melissa Golfin / Jennifer Ligator	6; 4	6; 2

== Paraguay vs. Peru ==
Paraguay
3
Cochabamba T.C, Cochabamba, Bolivia
13 April 1994
Clay (outdoors)

Peru
0

			1	2	3
1	(Paraguay) (Peru)	Larissa Schaerer; Déborah Gaviria	6; 1	6; 1
2	(Paraguay) (Peru)	Rossana de los Ríos; Gianfranca Devercelli	6; 1	6; 2
3	(Paraguay) (Peru)	Magalí Benítez / Larissa Schaerer; Gianfranca Devercelli / Déborah Gaviria	6; 1	6; 4

== Costa Rica vs. El Salvador ==
Costa Rica
2
Cochabamba T.C, Cochabamba, Bolivia
13 April 1994
Clay (outdoors)

El Salvador
1

			1	2	3
1	(Costa Rica) (El Salvador)	Melissa Golfin; Renate Wachtler	7; 5	6; 3
2	(Costa Rica) (El Salvador)	Paula Umaña; Ingrid González	7; 5	2; 6	6; 4
3	(Costa Rica) (El Salvador)	Jennifer Ligator / Paula Umaña; Ingrid González / Renate Wachtler	4; 6	6; 2	2; 6

== See also ==
- Fed Cup structure
