= 1992 Federation Cup Americas Zone – Pool A =

Group A of the 1992 Federation Cup Americas Zone was one of four pools in the Americas zone of the 1992 Federation Cup. Four teams competed in a round robin competition, with the top two teams advancing to the knockout stage.

	(Mexico) MEX	(Uruguay) URU	(Trinidad and Tobago) TRI	(El Salvador) ESA	RR; W–L	Set; W–L	Game; W–L	Standings
Mexico		3–0	3–0	3–0	3–0	18–1	113–37	1
Uruguay	0–3		3–0	3–0	2–1	13–6	95–78	2
Trinidad and Tobago	0–3	0–3		3–0	1–2	6–12	69–94	3
El Salvador	0–3	0–3	0–3		0–3	0–18	44–112	4

== Mexico vs. Trinidad and Tobago ==
Mexico
3
Atlas Colomos T.C, Guadalajara, Mexico
21 April 1992
Clay (outdoors)

Trinidad and Tobago
0

			1	2	3
1	(Mexico) (Trinidad and Tobago)	Isabela Petrov; Elizabeth Gibson	6; 3	6; 1
2	(Mexico) (Trinidad and Tobago)	Angélica Gavaldón; Kaisaran Siewrattan	6; 1	6; 0
3	(Mexico) (Trinidad and Tobago)	Angélica Gavaldón / Lupita Novelo; Jacinta Ayers / Elizabeth Gibson	6; 1	6; 1

== Uruguay vs. El Salvador ==
Uruguay
3
Atlas Colomos T.C, Guadalajara, Mexico
21 April 1992
Clay (outdoors)

El Salvador
0

			1	2	3
1	(Uruguay) (El Salvador)	Claudia Brause; Annette Falkenberg	6; 2	6; 0
2	(Uruguay) (El Salvador)	Laura Olave; Ingrid González	6; 3	7; 5
3	(Uruguay) (El Salvador)	Claudia Brause / Laura Olave; Annette Falkenberg / Ingrid González	6; 1	6; 3

== Mexico vs. Uruguay ==
Mexico
3
Atlas Colomos T.C, Guadalajara, Mexico
22 April 1992
Clay (outdoors)

Uruguay
0

			1	2	3
1	(Mexico) (Uruguay)	Isabela Petrov; Claudia Brause	6; 3	6; 2
2	(Mexico) (Uruguay)	Angélica Gavaldón; Laura Olave	6; 3	6; 1
3	(Mexico) (Uruguay)	Angélica Gavaldón / Lupita Novelo; Natalia de Cola / Laura Olave	6; 3	5; 7	6; 1

== Trinidad and Tobago vs. El Salvador ==
Trinidad and Tobago
3
Atlas Colomos T.C, Guadalajara, Mexico
22 April 1992
Clay (outdoors)

El Salvador
0

			1	2	3
1	(Trinidad and Tobago) (El Salvador)	Elizabeth Gibson; Annette Falkenberg	7; 5	7; 5
2	(Trinidad and Tobago) (El Salvador)	Kaisaran Siewrattan; Ingrid González	6; 3	6; 1
3	(Trinidad and Tobago) (El Salvador)	Elizabeth Gibson / Kaisaran Siewrattan; Annette Falkenberg / Ingrid González	7; 5	6; 1

== Uruguay vs. Trinidad and Tobago ==
Uruguay
3
Atlas Colomos T.C, Guadalajara, Mexico
23 April 1992
Clay (outdoors)

Trinidad and Tobago
0

			1	2	3
1	(Uruguay) (Trinidad and Tobago)	Claudia Brause; Elizabeth Gibson	6; 4	7; 5
2	(Uruguay) (Trinidad and Tobago)	Laura Olave; Kaisaran Siewrattan	6; 4	7; 5
3	(Uruguay) (Trinidad and Tobago)	Natalia de Cola / Laura Olave; Jacinta Ayers / Kaisaran Siewrattan	6; 2	6; 3

== Mexico vs. El Salvador ==
Mexico
3
Atlas Colomos T.C, Guadalajara, Mexico
23 April 1992
Clay (outdoors)

El Salvador
0

			1	2	3
1	(Mexico) (El Salvador)	Xóchitl Escobedo; Annette Falkenberg	6; 4	6; 0
2	(Mexico) (El Salvador)	Lupita Novelo; Ingrid González	6; 2	6; 2
3	(Mexico) (El Salvador)	Lupita Novelo / Isabela Petrov; Annette Falkenberg / Ingrid González	6; 0	6; 2

== See also ==
- Fed Cup structure
