= 1994 Federation Cup Americas Zone – Pool B =

Group B of the 1994 Federation Cup Americas Zone was one of four pools in the Americas zone of the 1994 Federation Cup. Four teams competed in a round robin competition, with the top three teams advancing to the knockout stage.

	(Chile) CHI	(Ecuador) ECU	(Trinidad and Tobago) TRI	(Jamaica) JAM	(The Bahamas) BAH	Match; W–L	Set; W–L	Game; W–L	Standings
Chile		2–1	2–1	w/o	3–0	4–0	17–4	118–58	1
Ecuador	1–2		2–1	3–0	3–0	3–1	21–8	155–93	2
Trinidad and Tobago	1–2	1–2		w/o	2–1	2–2	8–13	80–102	3
Jamaica	w/o	0–3	w/o		2–1	1–3	4–8	44–58	4
Bahamas	0–3	0–3	1–2	1–2		0–4	6–19	58–144	5

== Chile vs. Trinidad and Tobago ==
Chile
3
Cochabamba T.C, Cochabamba, Bolivia
11 April 1994
Clay (outdoors)

Trinidad and Tobago
0

			1	2	3
1	(Chile) (Trinidad and Tobago)	María-Alejandra Quezada; Kaisaran Siewrattan	6; 2	6; 2
2	(Chile) (Trinidad and Tobago)	Paula Cabezas; Elizabeth Gibson	6; 1	6; 1
3	(Chile) (Trinidad and Tobago)	Paula Cabezas / Bárbara Castro; Beverly Corbie / Elizabeth Gibson	6; 3	6; 2

== Jamaica vs. Bahamas ==
Jamaica
2
Cochabamba T.C, Cochabamba, Bolivia
11 April 1994
Clay (outdoors)

Bahamas
1

			1	2	3
1	(Jamaica) (The Bahamas)	Lisa Yap-Sam; Ann Simons	6; 1	6; 0
2	(Jamaica) (The Bahamas)	Joni Van Ryck De Groot; Kim Cartwright	6; 4	6; 4
3	(Jamaica) (The Bahamas)	Joni Van Ryck De Groot / Lisa Yap-Sam; Chris-Anne Aston / Kim Cartwright	3; 6	6^{0} 7^{7}

== Chile vs. Bahamas ==
Chile
2
Cochabamba T.C, Cochabamba, Bolivia
12 April 1994
Clay (outdoors)

Bahamas
1

			1	2	3
1	(Chile) (The Bahamas)	Bárbara Castro; Chris-Anne Aston	6; 2	6; 0
2	(Chile) (The Bahamas)	Paula Cabezas; Kim Cartwright	6; 1	6; 1
3	(Chile) (The Bahamas)	Paula Cabezas / Bárbara Castro; Chris-Anne Aston / Kim Cartwright	6; 0	6; 1

== Ecuador vs. Jamaica ==
Ecuador
3
Cochabamba T.C, Cochabamba, Bolivia
12 April 1994
Clay (outdoors)

Jamaica
0

			1	2	3
1	(Ecuador) (Jamaica)	Alexandra Guzmán; Lisa Yap-Sam	6; 2	6; 1
2	(Ecuador) (Jamaica)	María Dolores Campana; Joni Van Ryck De Groot	6; 2	6; 4
3	(Ecuador) (Jamaica)	María Dolores Campana / Nuria Niemes; Joni Van Ryck De Groot / Lisa Yap-Sam	6; 1	6; 1

== Ecuador vs. Trinidad and Tobago ==
Ecuador
2
Cochabamba T.C, Cochabamba, Bolivia
13 April 1994
Clay (outdoors)

Trinidad and Tobago
1

			1	2	3
1	(Ecuador) (Trinidad and Tobago)	Alexandra Guzmán; Kaisaran Siewrattan	6; 0	6; 2
2	(Ecuador) (Trinidad and Tobago)	María Dolores Campana; Elizabeth Gibson	6; 1	5; 7	6; 4
3	(Ecuador) (Trinidad and Tobago)	Alexandra Guzmán / Nuria Niemes; Beverly Corbie / Elizabeth Gibson	5; 7	6; 3	1; 6

== Chile vs. Ecuador ==
Chile
2
Cochabamba T.C, Cochabamba, Bolivia
14 April 1994
Clay (outdoors)

Ecuador
1

			1	2	3
1	(Chile) (Ecuador)	Bárbara Castro; Alexandra Guzmán	6; 3	4; 6	6; 2
2	(Chile) (Ecuador)	Paula Cabezas; María Dolores Campana	5; 7	6; 3	2; 6
3	(Chile) (Ecuador)	Paula Cabezas / Bárbara Castro; María Dolores Campana / Nuria Niemes	7; 5	5; 7	6; 3

== Trinidad and Tobago vs. Bahamas ==
Trinidad and Tobago
2
Cochabamba T.C, Cochabamba, Bolivia
14 April 1994
Clay (outdoors)

Bahamas
1

			1	2	3
1	(Trinidad and Tobago) (The Bahamas)	Beverly Corbie; Chris-Anne Aston	1; 6	6; 1	8; 10
2	(Trinidad and Tobago) (The Bahamas)	Elizabeth Gibson; Kim Cartwright	6; 2	6; 0
3	(Trinidad and Tobago) (The Bahamas)	Beverly Corbie / Elizabeth Gibson; Chris-Anne Aston / Kim Cartwright	6; 3	6; 3

== Ecuador vs. Bahamas ==
Ecuador
3
Cochabamba T.C, Cochabamba, Bolivia
15 April 1994
Clay (outdoors)

Bahamas
0

			1	2	3
1	(Ecuador) (The Bahamas)	Alexandra Guzmán; Lori Feingold	6; 0	6; 0
2	(Ecuador) (The Bahamas)	María Dolores Campana; Ann Simons	6; 3	6; 1
3	(Ecuador) (The Bahamas)	María Dolores Campana / Nuria Niemes; Chris-Anne Aston / Lori Feingold	6; 0	6; 2

== See also ==
- Fed Cup structure
