= 1997 Fed Cup Americas Zone Group I – Knockout Stage =

The Knockout Stage of the 1997 Fed Cup Americas Zone Group I was the final stage of the Zonal Competition involving teams from the Americas. Those that qualified for this stage placed first and second in their respective pools.

Placing	Pool A	Pool B
1	Canada	Colombia
2	Brazil	Peru
3	Ecuador	Chile
4	Mexico	Venezuela
5		Puerto Rico

The four teams were then randomly drawn into a two-stage knockout tournament, with the winner advancing to the World Group II Play-offs.

== Draw ==
Semifinals; 3 May
Canada	3
Peru	0
Brazil	0
Colombia	3

Final; 4 May
Canada	2
Colombia	1

=== Semifinals ===
==== Canada vs. Peru ====
Canada
3
Club Palestino, Santiago, Chile
3 May 1997
Red clay (outdoors)

Peru
0

			1	2	3
1	(Canada) (Peru)	Rene Simpson; Carla Rodríguez	6; 0	6; 2
2	(Canada) (Peru)	Patricia Hy; Nanely Vallejo	6; 1	6; 1
3	(Canada) (Peru)	Sonya Jeyaseelan / Rene Simpson; Carla Rodríguez / Nanely Vallejo	6; 0	6; 4

==== Brazil vs. Colombia ====
Brazil
0
Club Palestino, Santiago, Chile
3 May 1997
Red clay (outdoors)

Colombia
3

			1	2	3
1	(Brazil) (Colombia)	Eugenia Maia; Carmiña Giraldo	5; 7	6; 4	5; 7
2	(Brazil) (Colombia)	Vanessa Menga; Fabiola Zuluaga	1; 6	3; 6
3	(Brazil) (Colombia)	Joana Cortez / Luciana Tella; Carmiña Giraldo / Fabiola Zuluaga	2; 6	1; 6

=== Final ===
==== Canada vs. Colombia ====
Canada
2
Club Palestino, Santiago, Chile
4 May 1997
Red clay (outdoors)

Colombia
1

			1	2	3
1	(Canada) (Colombia)	Rene Simpson; Carmiña Giraldo	6; 2	7; 5
2	(Canada) (Colombia)	Patricia Hy; Fabiola Zuluaga	3; 6	1; 6
3	(Canada) (Colombia)	Sonya Jeyaseelan / Rene Simpson; Carmiña Giraldo / Fabiola Zuluaga	6; 1	7; 5

- Canada advanced to the World Group II Play-offs, where they were drawn against Slovakia. However, they lost 0–5, and thus returned to the Americas Zone Group I in 1997.

== See also ==
- Fed Cup structure
