= Aránzazu Gallardo =

Mexican tennis player

- Country (sports): Mexico
- Born: 30 September 1973 (age 51)
- Prize money: $15,077

Singles
- Highest ranking: No. 324 (4 December 1989)

Doubles
- Highest ranking: No. 364 (29 July 1991)

Aránzazu Gallardo (born 30 September 1973) is a former professional tennis player from Mexico.

== Biography ==
Gallardo appeared in six Federation Cup ties for Mexico, between 1989 and 1991.

On the professional tour, Gallardo reached a best singles ranking of 324 and featured in the main draw of the Aurora Classic WTA Tour tournament in 1991, where she was beaten in the first round by Anne Minter.

At the 1991 Pan American Games in Havana she partnered with Isabela Petrov to win a bronze medal in the women's doubles.

== ITF finals ==
=== Singles (1–3) ===
Result	No.	Date	Tournament	Surface	Opponent	Score
Loss	1.	17 July 1988	Guadalajara, Mexico	Clay	(Mexico) Claudia Hernández	0–6, 3–6
Loss	2.	28 May 1989	Mexico City, Mexico	Clay	(United States) Sylvia Schenck	6–7, 6–2, 4–6
Loss	3.	9 July 1989	Puerto Vallarta, Mexico	Hard	(Mexico) Claudia Hernández	6–4, 2–6, 2–6
Win	1.	19 September 1994	Guadalajara, Mexico	Hard	(Mexico) Lucila Becerra	4–6, 6–3, 6–1

=== Doubles (2–2) ===
Result	No.	Date	Tournament	Surface	Partner	Opponents	Score
Loss	1.	17 July 1988	Guadalajara, Mexico	Clay	(Mexico) Blanca Borbolla	(Mexico) Lucila Becerra (Mexico) Xóchitl Escobedo	2–6, 1–6
Win	1.	12 May 1991	Mexico City, Mexico	Hard	(Mexico) Claudia Hernández	(Venezuela) Helene Kappler (Mexico) Claudia Rodríguez	3–6, 7–5, 7–6^{(2)}
Loss	2.	26 May 1991	Aguascalientes, Mexico	Harf	(Mexico) Claudia Hernández	(Mexico) Xóchitl Escobedo (Mexico) Isabela Petrov	3–6, 6–7^{(4)}
Win	2.	25 September 1994	Guadalajara, Mexico	Hard	(Mexico) Ana Paola González	(Brazil) Sumara Passos (Mexico) Graciela Vélez	6–4, 6–2
