= Claudia Hernández (tennis) =

Mexican tennis player

- Full name: Claudia Hernández Salas
- Country (sports): Mexico
- Born: 19 January 1966 (age 60)
- Height: 180 cm (5 ft 11 in)
- Prize money: $25,949

Singles
- Highest ranking: No. 203 (20 July 1987)

Doubles
- Highest ranking: No. 197 (3 August 1987)

Claudia Hernández Salas (Note: In this Spanish name, the first or paternal surname is Hernández and the second or maternal family name is Salas.) (born 19 January 1966) is a Mexican former professional tennis player.

== Biography ==
=== Tennis career ===
Hernández was the 16 and under Orange Bowl champion in 1982 and made the girls' singles quarter-finals of the 1983 US Open. As a Pan American Games competitor for Mexico she won two medals, both women's doubles bronze medals, in 1983 and 1987. Hernández, who played college tennis for the USC Trojans, represented Mexico at the 1988 Summer Olympics in Seoul, playing singles and doubles (with Xóchitl Escobedo). During her nine-year Federation Cup career she featured in a total of 22 ties for her country.

=== Personal life ===
Hernández is married Rafael Belmar Osuna, who is the nephew of US Open champion Rafael Osuna.

== ITF finals ==
=== Singles (6–1) ===
Result	No.	Date	Tournament	Surface	Opponent	Score
Win	1.	3 August 1986	Querétaro, Mexico	Clay	(Mexico) Lucila Becerra	W/O
Win	2.	10 August 1986	León, Guanajuato, Mexico	Clay	(Argentina) Andrea Tiezzi	6–0, 6–4
Win	3.	5 April 1987	Kailua-Kona, Hawaii, United States	Hard	(United States) Shandra Livingston	6–2, 6–2
Win	4.	12 July 1987	San Luis Potosí, Mexico	Hard	(Japan) Mayumi Yamada	6–4, 3–6, 6–2
Win	5.	17 July 1988	Guadalajara, Mexico	Clay	(Mexico) Aránzazu Gallardo	6–0, 6–3
Loss	1.	31 July 1988	Mexico City, Mexico	Clay	(Mexico) Lucila Becerra	1–6, 3–6
Win	6.	9 July 1989	Puerto Vallarta, Mexico	Hard	(Mexico) Aránzazu Gallardo	4–6, 6–2, 6–2

=== Doubles (1–6) ===
Result	No.	Date	Tournament	Surface	Partner	Opponents	Score
Loss	1.	3 August 1986	Querétaro, Mexico	Clay	(Mexico) Leticia Herrera	(Mexico) Lucila Becerra (Mexico) Maluca Llamas	6–4, 4–6, 4–6
Loss	2.	10 August 1986	León, Guanajuato, Mexico	Clay	(Mexico) Leticia Herrera	(Mexico) Lucila Becerra (Mexico) Maluca Llamas	3–6, 3–6
Loss	3.	8 September 1986	Lisbon, Portugal	Clay	(Hong Kong) Patricia Hy	(Spain) María José Llorca (Spain) Ninoska Souto	1–6, 6–4, 4–6
Loss	4.	19 July 1987	León, Guanajuato, Mexico	Hard	(Mexico) Leticia Herrera	(Australia) Jackie Masters (New Zealand) Michelle Parun	4–6, 6–7
Loss	5.	7 March 1988	Castellón, Spain	Clay	(Mexico) Lucila Becerra	(Spain) Janet Souto (Spain) Ninoska Souto	6–4, 2–6, 2–6
Win	1.	12 May 1991	Mexico City, Mexico	Hard	(Mexico) Aránzazu Gallardo	(Venezuela) Helene Kappler (Mexico) Claudia Rodríguez	3–6, 7–5, 7–6^{(2)}
Loss	6.	26 May 1991	Aguascalientes, Mexico	Harf	(Mexico) Aránzazu Gallardo	(Mexico) Xóchitl Escobedo (Mexico) Isabela Petrov	3–6, 6–7^{(4)}
