= Tracey Hiete =

American tennis player

- Full name: Tracey Hiete Smith
- Country (sports): United States
- Born: January 29, 1971 (age 54)
- Prize money: $16,674

Singles
- Career record: 55–62
- Highest ranking: No. 334 (August 18, 1997)

Doubles
- Career record: 27–30
- Career titles: 3 ITF
- Highest ranking: No. 257 (July 24, 1995)

Tracey Hiete Smith (born January 29, 1971) is an American former professional tennis player.

Hiete, who grew up in Pacific Palisades, played college tennis for Duke University.

Graduating from Duke in 1993, Hiete played on the professional tour until 1998 and reached a career high singles ranking of 334 in the world. As a doubles player she made a WTA Tour main draw appearance at the 1996 Acura Classic and won three titles on the ITF Circuit, reaching a career best ranking of 257.

Hiete married Australian rugby league personality Jimmy Smith in 2009 and now lives in Sydney.

== ITF finals ==
=== Doubles: 5 (3–2) ===
Result	No.	Date	Tournament	Surface	Partner	Opponents	Score
Loss	1.	January 30, 1995	Woodlands, United States	Hard	(China) Jody Yin	(United Kingdom) Michele Mair (South Africa) Karen van der Merwe	2–6, 4–6
Win	1.	June 18, 1995	Morelia, Mexico	Hard	(Canada) Renata Kolbovic	(Colombia) Ximena Rodríguez (Namibia) Elizma Nortje	6–3, 7–5
Loss	2.	June 25, 1995	Toluca, Mexico	Hard	(Canada) Renata Kolbovic	(Mexico) Lucila Becerra (Mexico) Jessica Fernández	4–6, 4–6
Win	2.	October 13, 1996	Mexico City Mexico	Hard	(Canada) Renata Kolbovic	(Slovakia) Alena Paulenková (Mexico) Karin Palme	6–3, 5–7, 6–4
Win	3.	October 20, 1996	Coatzacoalcos, Mexico	Hard	(Canada) Renata Kolbovic	(Mexico) Claudia Muciño (Ecuador) María Dolores Campana	6–3, 6–3
