= 1997 Fed Cup Americas Zone Group I – Pool B =

Group B of the 1997 Fed Cup Americas Zone Group I was one of two pools in the Americas Zone Group I of the 1997 Fed Cup. Five teams competed in a round robin competition, with the top two teams advancing to the knockout stage, and the bottom team being relegated down to 1998 Group II.

	(Colombia) COL	(Peru) PER	(Chile) CHI	(Venezuela) VEN	(Puerto Rico) PUR	RR; W–L	Set; W–L	Game; W–L	Standings
Colombia		3–0	w/o	3–0	3–0	3–1	18–0	109–36	1
Peru	0–3		2–1	1–2	2–1	2–2	8–16	90–129	2
Chile	w/o	1–2		2–1	3–0	2–1	12–4	93–55	3
Venezuela	0–3	2–1	1–2		1–2	1–3	9–16	96–125	4
Puerto Rico	0–3	1–2	0–3	2–1		1–3	8–19	104–147	5

== Chile vs. Venezuela ==
Chile
2
Club Palestino, Santiago, Chile
28 April 1997
Red clay (outdoors)

Venezuela
1

			1	2	3
1	(Chile) (Venezuela)	Bárbara Castro; Mariela Salinas	6; 3	6; 0
2	(Chile) (Venezuela)	Paula Cabezas; María Vento	6; 1	6; 1
3	(Chile) (Venezuela)	Bárbara Castro / María-Alejandra Quezada; Paola Stephen / María Vento	4; 6	5; 7

== Peru vs. Puerto Rico ==
Peru
2
Club Palestino, Santiago, Chile
28 April 1997
Red clay (outdoors)

Puerto Rico
1

			1	2	3
1	(Peru) (Puerto Rico)	Carla Rodríguez; Vilmarie Castellvi	6; 3	7; 5
2	(Peru) (Puerto Rico)	Nanely Vallejo; Mari Toró	6; 3	2; 6	5; 7
3	(Peru) (Puerto Rico)	Carla Rodríguez / Silvana Vargas; Joanne Bauzà / Emilie Viqueira	5; 7	6; 3	6; 3

== Colombia vs. Venezuela ==
Colombia
3
Club Palestino, Santiago, Chile
29 April 1997
Red clay (outdoors)

Venezuela
0

			1	2	3
1	(Colombia) (Venezuela)	Carmiña Giraldo; Paola Stephen	6; 0	6; 1
2	(Colombia) (Venezuela)	Fabiola Zuluaga; María Vento	6; 4	6; 3
3	(Colombia) (Venezuela)	Carmiña Giraldo / Fabiola Zuluaga; Paola Stephen / María Vento	6; 3	6; 4

== Chile vs. Puerto Rico ==
Chile
3
Club Palestino, Santiago, Chile
29 April 1997
Red clay (outdoors)

Puerto Rico
0

			1	2	3
1	(Chile) (Puerto Rico)	Bárbara Castro; Vilmarie Castellvi	6; 2	6; 2
2	(Chile) (Puerto Rico)	Paula Cabezas; Mari Toró	4; 6	6; 3	6; 4
3	(Chile) (Puerto Rico)	Bárbara Castro / María-Alejandra Quezada; Joanne Bauzà / Emilie Viqueira	6; 4	6; 2

== Colombia vs. Peru ==
Colombia
3
Club Palestino, Santiago, Chile
30 April 1997
Red clay (outdoors)

Peru
0

			1	2	3
1	(Colombia) (Peru)	Carmiña Giraldo; Carla Rodríguez	6; 1	6; 1
2	(Colombia) (Peru)	Fabiola Zuluaga; Nanely Vallejo	6; 2	6; 0
3	(Colombia) (Peru)	Carmiña Giraldo / Fabiola Zuluaga; Carla Rodríguez / Silvana Vargas	6; 1	6; 3

== Venezuela vs. Puerto Rico ==
Venezuela
1
Club Palestino, Santiago, Chile
30 April 1997
Red clay (outdoors)

Puerto Rico
2

			1	2	3
1	(Venezuela) (Puerto Rico)	Mariela Salinas; Vilmarie Castellvi	6^{5} 7^{7}	0; 6
2	(Venezuela) (Puerto Rico)	María Vento; Mari Toró	6; 2	6; 3
3	(Venezuela) (Puerto Rico)	Paola Stephen / María Vento; Mari Toró / Emilie Viqueira	4; 6	5; 7

== Colombia vs. Puerto Rico ==
Colombia
3
Club Palestino, Santiago, Chile
1 May 1997
Red clay (outdoors)

Puerto Rico
0

			1	2	3
1	(Colombia) (Puerto Rico)	Carmiña Giraldo; Vilmarie Castellvi	6; 2	7^{10} 6^{8}
2	(Colombia) (Puerto Rico)	Fabiola Zuluaga; Mari Toró	6; 1	6; 0
3	(Colombia) (Puerto Rico)	Carmiña Giraldo / Fabiola Zuluaga; Mari Toró / Emilie Viqueira	6; 2	6; 2

== Peru vs. Chile ==
Peru
2
Club Palestino, Santiago, Chile
1 May 1997
Red clay (outdoors)

Chile
1

			1	2	3
1	(Peru) (Chile)	Carla Rodríguez; María-Alejandra Quezada	5; 7	2; 6
2	(Peru) (Chile)	Nanely Vallejo; Paula Cabezas	7^{7} 6^{4}	1; 0		retired
3	(Peru) (Chile)	Carla Rodríguez / Silvana Vargas; Paula Cabezas / María-Alejandra Quezada				w/o

== Peru vs. Venezuela ==
Peru
1
Club Palestino, Santiago, Chile
2 May 1997
Red clay (outdoors)

Venezuela
2

			1	2	3
1	(Peru) (Venezuela)	Silvana Vargas; Mariela Salinas	1; 6	6^{2} 7^{7}
2	(Peru) (Venezuela)	Nanely Vallejo; María Vento	1; 6	1; 6
3	(Peru) (Venezuela)	Carla Rodríguez / Silvana Vargas; Mariela Salinas / Paola Stephen	4; 6	6; 2	6; 3

- Puerto Rico placed last in the pool, and thus was relegated to Group II in 1998, where they placed first in their pool of eight and as such advanced back to Group I for 1998.

== See also ==
- Fed Cup structure
