= Ximena Rodríguez =

Colombian tennis player

- Country (sports): Colombia
- Born: 15 September 1976 (age 48)
- Turned pro: 1991
- Plays: 1998
- Prize money: $20,488

Singles
- Career record: 42–70
- Career titles: 0
- Highest ranking: No. 515 (3 March 1996)

Doubles
- Career record: 84–58
- Career titles: 7 ITF
- Highest ranking: No. 218 (5 February 1996)

Ximena Rodríguez (born 15 September 1976) is a former Colombian female tennis player.

Playing for Colombia in Fed Cup competition, Rodríguez has accumulated a win–loss record of 3–2.

== ITF Circuit finals ==
=== Doubles (7-12) ===
$100,000 tournaments
$75,000 tournaments
$50,000 tournaments
$25,000 tournaments
$10,000 tournaments

Result	No.	Date	Tournament	Surface	Partner	Opponents	Score
Win	1.	19 April 1993	ITF San Salvador, El Salvador	Clay	(Mexico) Xóchitl Escobedo	(Colombia) Carmiña Giraldo (Colombia) Cecilia Hincapié	6–2, 2–6, 6–4
Loss	2.	3 October 1993	ITF Lima, Peru	Clay	(Colombia) Carmiña Giraldo	(Paraguay) Magalí Benítez (Brazil) Miriam D'Agostini	4–6, 2–6
Loss	3.	10 October 1993	ITF La Paz, Bolivia	Clay	(Colombia) Carmiña Giraldo	(Peru) Carla Rodriguez (Peru) Lorena Rodriguez	5–7, 2–6
Win	4.	27 September 1993	ITF Santo Domingo, Dominican Republic	Clay	(Hungary) Virág Csurgó	(Ecuador) María Dolores Campana (Ecuador) Nuria Niemes	6–4, 6–1
Loss	5.	15 November 1993	ITF San Salvador, El Salvador	Hard	(Colombia) Carmiña Giraldo	(Ecuador) María Dolores Campana (United Kingdom) Joanne Moore	3–6, 4–6
Loss	6.	28 March 1994	ITF Alicante, Spain	Hard	(Sweden) Maria-Farnes Capistrano	(Netherlands) Lara Bitter (Netherlands) Aafje Evers	1–6, 4–6
Loss	7.	16 May 1994	ITF Tortosa, Spain	Clay	(Argentina) Mariana Randrup	(Belgium) Caroline Bodart (Argentina) Florencia Cianfagna	4–6, 2–6
Loss	8.	18 July 1994	ITF Mexico City	Hard	(Costa Rica) Paula Umaña	(Mexico) Lucila Becerra (Mexico) Claudia Muciño	7–5, 4–6, 3–6
Loss	9.	29 August 1994	ITF San Salvador, El Salvador	Hard	(Ecuador) María Dolores Campana	(United States) Kellie Dorman-Tyrone (United States) Philippa Palmer	2–6, 4–6
Loss	10.	24 October 1994	ITF Negril, Jamaica	Hard	(Namibia) Elizma Nortje	(South Africa) Kim Grant (United States) Claire Sessions Bailey	2–6, 7–6^{(6)}, 3–6
Loss	11.	13 February 1995	ITF Bogotá, Colombia	Clay	(United Kingdom) Joanne Moore	(Argentina) María José Gaidano (Brazil) Andrea Vieira	4–6, 6–1, 1–6
Win	12.	27 February 1995	ITF Cartagena, Colombia	Hard	(United Kingdom) Joanne Moore	(Belgium) Caroline Bodart (Brazil) Patrícia Segala	6–1, 6–2
Loss	13.	12 June 1995	ITF Morelia, Mexico	Hard	(Namibia) Elizma Nortje	(United States) Tracey Hiete (Canada) Renata Kolbovic	3–6, 5–7
Win	14.	17 July 1995	ITF Santos, Brazil	Clay	(Dominican Republic) Joelle Schad	(Brazil) Vanessa Menga (Argentina) Valentina Solari	5–7, 6–3, 6–1
Loss	15.	4 September 1995	ITF Medellín, Colombia	Clay	(United Kingdom) Joanne Moore	(Argentina) Mariana Díaz Oliva (Brazil) Eugenia Maia	3–6, 2–6
Win	16.	11 September 1995	ITF Bucaramanga, Colombia	Clay	(United Kingdom) Joanne Moore	(Colombia) Carmiña Giraldo (Colombia) Mariana Mesa	7–5, 4–6, 6–4
Loss	17.	18 September 1995	ITF Manizales, Colombia	Clay	(United Kingdom) Joanne Moore	(Argentina) Mariana Díaz Oliva (Brazil) Eugenia Maia	4–6, 3–6
Win	18.	8 April 1996	ITF Calvi, France	Hard	(Colombia) Carmiña Giraldo	(Romania) Alida Gallovits (Czech Republic) Petra Plačková	w/o
Win	19.	23 June 1997	ITF Manaus, Brazil	Hard	(United Kingdom) Joanne Moore	(Germany) Caroline Germar (Republic of Ireland) Kelly Liggan	6–0, 6–2
