= Maluca Llamas =

Mexican tennis player

- Full name: María Elena Llamas
- Country (sports): Mexico
- Born: 4 August 1962 (age 63)

Singles
- Highest ranking: No. 421 (21 December 1986)

Doubles
- Highest ranking: No. 207 (3 August 1987)

María Elena "Maluca" Llamas (born 4 August 1962) is a Mexican former professional tennis player. She is the daughter of Davis Cup player Mario Llamas.

Llamas was a bronze medalist in the women's singles event at the 1979 Pan American Games in San Juan.

Between 1979 and 1989, she appeared in eight Federation Cup ties for Mexico. During this time, she also competed in ITF satellite tournaments, mostly local, to reach career rankings of 421 in singles and 207 in doubles.

== ITF finals ==
=== Singles (0–1) ===
Outcome	No.	Date	Tournament	Surface	Opponent	Score
Runner-up	1.	8 September 1985	Mexico City, Mexico	Clay	(Mexico) Susana Rojas	1–6, 3–6

=== Doubles (3–2) ===
Outcome	No.	Date	Tournament	Surface	Partner	Opponents	Score
Winner	1.	3 August 1986	Querétaro, Mexico	Clay	(Mexico) Lucila Becerra	(Mexico) Claudia Hernández (Mexico) Leticia Herrera	4–6, 6–4, 6–4
Winner	2.	10 August 1986	León, Mexico	Clay	(Mexico) Lucila Becerra	(Mexico) Claudia Hernández (Mexico) Leticia Herrera	6–3, 6–3
Runner-up	1.	18 September 1986	Murcia, Spain	Clay	(Mexico) Lucila Becerra	(Finland) Anne Aallonen (Hong Kong) Patricia Hy	6–7, 3–6
Runner-up	2.	29 June 1987	Mexico City, Mexico	Hard	(Mexico) Lucila Becerra	(Netherlands) Carin Bakkum (Brazil) Themis Zambrzycki	3–6, 4–6
Winner	3.	12 July 1987	San Luis Potosí, Mexico	Hard	(Mexico) Lucila Becerra	(Australia) Jackie Masters (New Zealand) Michelle Parun	6–4, 7–6
