= Renata Kolbovic =

Canadian tennis player

- Country (sports): Canada
- Residence: Vancouver, British Columbia
- Born: July 30, 1976 (age 49) Brno, Czechoslovakia
- Height: 1.68 m (5 ft 6 in)
- Turned pro: March 1, 1996
- Retired: 2003
- Plays: Right-handed (one-handed backhand)
- Prize money: $185,251

Singles
- Career record: 197–189
- Career titles: 1 ITF
- Highest ranking: No. 159 (December 4, 2000)

Grand Slam singles results
- Australian Open: Q1 (2000, 2001)
- French Open: Q1 (2000, 2001)
- Wimbledon: Q2 (2000)
- US Open: Q2 (1999, 2000)

Doubles
- Career record: 158–132
- Career titles: 12 ITF
- Highest ranking: No. 119 (September 14, 1998)

Grand Slam doubles results
- Australian Open: 1R (2000, 2001)
- French Open: 1R (2001)
- Wimbledon: 1R (2000, 2001, 2002)
- US Open: Q2 (1998, 2001)

Team competitions
- Fed Cup: 8–1
Medal record
Representing Canada
Women's tennis
Pan American Games
Bronze medal – third place	1999 Winnipeg	Doubles

Renata Kolbovic (born July 30, 1976) is a former tennis player, who was born in Czechoslovakia but competed for Canada.

Kolbovic had a professional career from 1996 to 2002. A resident of Vancouver, British Columbia, Kolbovic reached her highest individual ranking in the WTA Tour on December 4, 2000, when she became the No. 159 in the world.

Alongside Aneta Soukup, she won the bronze medal at the 1999 Pan American Games in Winnipeg, Canada.

== WTA career finals ==
=== Doubles: 1 (1 runner-up) ===
Legend Grand Slam tournaments (0–0) WTA Tour Finals (0–0) Tier I (0–0) Tier II (0–0) Tier III, IV & V (0–1)	Finals by surface Hard (0–1) Grass (0–0) Clay (0–0) Carpet (0–0)

Result	W–L	Date	Tournament	Tier	Surface	Partner	Opponents	Score
Loss	0–1	Sep 1997	Commonwealth Bank Tennis Classic, Indonesia	Tier IV	Hard	(Canada) Maureen Drake	(Australia) Kerry-Anne Guse (Japan) Rika Hiraki	1–6, 6–7^{(5–7)}

== ITF finals ==
=== Singles (1–9) ===
$75,000 tournaments
$50,000 tournaments
$25,000 tournaments
$10,000 tournaments

Result	No.	Date	Tournament	Surface	Opponent	Score
Loss	1.	27 March 1994	Puerto Vallarta, Mexico	Clay	(Chile) Paula Cabezas	2–6, 3–6
Loss	2.	19 June 1995	Toluca, Mexico	Clay	(United States) Meghann Shaughnessy	3–6, 2–6
Win	3.	26 June 1995	Mexico City, Mexico	Hard	(Dominican Republic) Joelle Schad	4–6, 7–6, 7–6
Loss	4.	13 October 1996	Mexico City, Mexico	Hard	(Chile) Paula Cabezas	6–2, 3–6, 2–6
Loss	5.	21 October 1996	Puebla, Mexico	Hard	(Ecuador) María Dolores Campana	6–2, 2–6, 2–6
Loss	6.	14 June 1998	Hilton Head Island, United States	Hard	(United States) Holly Parkinson	6–3, 4–6, 4–6
Loss	7.	28 June 1998	Montreal, Canada	Hard	(Canada) Vanessa Webb	3–6, 4–6
Loss	8.	13 June 1999	Hilton Head Island, United States	Hard	(United States) Jennifer Hopkins	6–2, 4–6, 2–6
Loss	9.	11 July 1999	Vancouver, Canada	Hard	(Canada) Jana Nejedly	6–2, 3–6, 3–6
Loss	10.	1 October 2000	Santa Clara, United States	Hard	(United States) Meilen Tu	7–6, 2–6, 2–6

=== Doubles (12–13) ===
Result	No.	Date	Tournament	Surface	Partner	Opponents	Score
Win	1.	30 August 1992	Querétaro, Mexico	Hard	(Canada) Vanessa Webb	(Mexico) Lucila Becerra (Mexico) Xóchitl Escobedo	6–3, 6–2
Loss	2.	6 September 1992	Toluca, Mexico	Hard	(Canada) Vanessa Webb	(Mexico) Lucila Becerra (Mexico) Xóchitl Escobedo	6–7, 7–6, 5–7
Loss	3.	16 May 1993	León, Mexico	Clay	(Canada) Vanessa Webb	(Canada) Mélanie Bernard (Canada) Caroline Delisle	6–3, 3–6, 1–6
Win	4.	18 September 1994	Vancouver, Canada	Hard	(Canada) Marjorie Blackwood	(Canada) Mélanie Bernard (Canada) Caroline Delisle	7–5, 6–2
Win	5.	18 June 1995	Morelia, Mexico	Hard	(United States) Tracey Hiete	(Colombia) Ximena Rodríguez (Namibia) Elizma Nortje	6–3, 7–5
Loss	6.	25 June 1995	Toluca, Mexico	Hard	(United States) Tracey Hiete	(Mexico) Lucila Becerra (Mexico) Jessica Fernández	4–6, 4–6
Win	7.	13 October 1996	Mexico City Mexico	Hard	(United States) Tracey Hiete	(Slovakia) Alena Paulenková (Mexico) Karin Palme	6–3, 5–7, 6–4
Win	8.	20 October 1996	Coatzacoalcos, Mexico	Hard	(United States) Tracey Hiete	(Mexico) Claudia Muciño (Ecuador) María Dolores Campana	6–3, 6–3
Loss	9.	1 June 1997	El Paso, United States	Hard	(Republic of Ireland) Anne Mall	(United States) Kaysie Smashey (United States) Sara Walker	7–6, 4–6, 0–6
Win	10.	18 January 1998	Delray Beach, United States	Hard	(Canada) Maureen Drake	(United States) Jean Okada (United States) Keri Phebus	7–6^{(3)}, 6–4
Win	11.	1 February 1998	Clearwater, United States	Hard	(Canada) Maureen Drake	(Puerto Rico) Kristina Brandi (United States) Karin Miller	4–6, 6–3, 6–4
Loss	12.	10 May 1998	Midlothian, United States	Clay	(Canada) Maureen Drake	(Australia) Trudi Musgrave (United States) Brie Rippner	3–6, 3–6
Loss	13.	17 May 1998	Haines City, United States	Clay	(Canada) Maureen Drake	(South Africa) Nannie De Villiers (South Africa) Jessica Steck	3–6, 2–6
Loss	14.	24 May 1998	Spartanburg, United States	Clay	(South Africa) Jessica Steck	(Japan) Keiko Ishida (Japan) Keiko Nagatomi	3–6, 5–7
Win	15.	28 June 1998	Montreal, Canada	Hard	(Canada) Vanessa Webb	(Canada) Mélanie Marois (Canada) Katherine Rammo	6–3, 6–1
Loss	16.	2 August 1998	Winnipeg, Canada	Hard	(United Kingdom) Julie Pullin	(Canada) Vanessa Webb (United States) Keri Phebus	6–4, 4–6, 6–7
Win	17.	23 November 1998	Culiacan, Mexico	Clay	(Russia) Alina Jidkova	(Hungary) Zsófia Gubacsi (Switzerland) Aliénor Tricerri	6–3, 6–2
Loss	18.	3 May 1999	Sarasota, United States	Clay	(United States) Karin Miller	(Australia) Annabel Ellwood (Australia) Lisa McShea	5–7, 6–7^{(3)}
Loss	19.	17 May 1999	Jackson, United States	Clay	(United States) Tracy Almeda-Singian	(United States) Julie Steven (United States) Lindsay Lee-Waters	6–4, 5–7, 2–6
Loss	20.	11 July 1999	Edmonton, Canada	Hard	(Germany) Kirstin Freye	(United States) Dawn Buth (Canada) Vanessa Webb	3–6, 2–6
Loss	21.	9 July 2000	Los Gatos, United States	Hard	(United States) Sandra Cacic	(Chinese Taipei) Janet Lee (Canada) Vanessa Webb	4–6, 1–6
Win	22.	16 July 2000	Winnipeg, Canada	Hard	(Canada) Vanessa Webb	(Germany) Kirstin Freye (Hong Kong) Tong Ka-po	6–1, 6–4
Loss	23.	6 August 2000	Lexington, United States	Hard	(United States) Sandra Cacic	(Chinese Taipei) Janet Lee (Indonesia) Wynne Prakusya	2–6, 6–3, 2–6
Win	24.	30 July 2001	Vancouver, Canada	Hard	(United States) Erika deLone	(Slovenia) Petra Rampre (Canada) Vanessa Webb	2–6, 6–4, 6–4
Win	25.	4 August 2002	Vancouver, Canada	Hard	(Canada) Amanda Augustus	(United States) Lauren Kalvaria (United States) Gabriela Lastra	7–5, 7–5
