= Jessica Fernández =

Mexican tennis player

- Country (sports): Mexico
- Born: 19 July 1979 (age 46)
- Plays: Right-handed
- Prize money: $80,870

Singles
- Highest ranking: No. 195 (12 October 1998)

Doubles
- Highest ranking: No. 197 (13 September 1999)

Jessica Fernández (born 19 July 1979) is a former professional tennis player from Mexico.

== Biography ==
Fernández holds the Mexico Fed Cup record for most ties played, which stands at 29. She started out as a 15-year old in 1995 and on debut played one of the longest Fed Cup matches in history when she defeated Colombia's Carmiña Giraldo, 13–11 in the third set.

As a junior, Fernández was an Orange Bowl doubles finalist and twice made the quarter-finals of the girls' doubles at the US Open.

Fernández reached a best singles ranking on the professional tour of 195 in the world. She made her first WTA Tour main draw appearance in 1998, featuring in the doubles at Quebec City with Tracy Singian. Her only singles appearance in a main draw came at Acapulco in 2004, where she competed as a wildcard and was beaten in the first round by Ukrainian player Julia Vakulenko.

Retiring from professional tennis in 2004, Fernández was the last Mexican female player to be ranked in the world's top 200 for singles until Marcela Zacarías in 2015.

== ITF finals ==
$25,000 tournaments
$10,000 tournaments

=== Singles (1–2) ===
Result	No.	Date	Tournament	Surface	Opponent	Score
Loss	1.	24 July 1994	Mexico City, Mexico	Hard	(Mexico) Karin Palme	0–6, 3–6
Win	1.	31 July 1994	Monterrey, Mexico	Hard	(United States) Sylvia Schenck	2–6, 7–5, 6–3
Loss	2.	22 June 1997	Mount Pleasant, United States	Hard	(Australia) Gail Biggs	3–6, 6–4, 5–7

=== Doubles (2–3) ===
Result	No.	Date	Tournament	Surface	Partner	Opponents	Score
Loss	1.	20 March 1995	Moulins, France	Hard	(Australia) Aarthi Venkatesan	(France) Nathalie Dechy (France) Catherine Tanvier	1–6, 3–6
Win	1.	25 June 1995	Toluca, Mexico	Hard	(Mexico) Lucila Becerra	(United States) Tracey Hiete (Canada) Renata Kolbovic	6–4, 6–4
Win	2.	20 November 1995	Curaçao, Netherlands	Hard	(Germany) Cornelia Grünes	(Colombia) Giana Gutiérrez (Germany) Nina Nittinger	6–2, 6–1
Loss	2.	12 September 1998	Mexico City, Mexico	Hard	(Argentina) Celeste Contín	(Netherlands) Seda Noorlander (Greece) Christína Papadáki	3–6, 1–6
Loss	3.	6 October 2003	LaFayette, United States	Hard	(United States) Kara Molony-Hussey	(Canada) Maureen Drake (United States) Lindsay Lee-Waters	2–6, 3–6
