= Xóchitl Escobedo =

Mexican tennis player (born 1968)

- Full name: Maria Xóchitl Escobedo Alcalde
- Country (sports): Mexico
- Born: 17 October 1968 (age 57) Jerez de García Salinas, Mexico
- Retired: 1996
- Prize money: $35,493

Singles
- Career record: 118-85
- Career titles: 0 WTA, 3 ITF
- Highest ranking: No. 284 (20 November 1989)

Other tournaments
- Olympic Games: 1R (1988)

Doubles
- Career record: 99–52
- Career titles: 0 WTA, 15 ITF
- Highest ranking: No. 198 (16 November 1992)

Other doubles tournaments
- Olympic Games: 1R (1988)

Maria Xóchitl Escobedo Alcalde (Note: In this Mexican name, the surname is Escobedo and the second or maternal family name is Alcalde.) (born September 17, 1968) is a retired female tennis player from Mexico, who represented her country at the 1988 Summer Olympics in Seoul, South Korea. She reached a career-high singles ranking on November 20, 1989 when she became ranked the number 284 in the world.

Escobedo is married to former Olympian Eduardo Nava. Their son Emilio is an ATP tennis player who, as a junior, was the runner-up in both singles and doubles at both the Australian Open (2019s&d) and the US Open (2019s, 2018d). Escobedo is also the aunt of ATP tennis player Ernesto Escobedo.

== ITF Circuit finals ==
=== Singles: 6 (3–3) ===
$100,000 tournaments
$75,000 tournaments
$50,000 tournaments
$25,000 tournaments
$10,000 tournaments

Result	No.	Date	Tournament	Surface	Opponent	Score
Loss	1.	4 December 1988	Melbourne, Australia	Hard	(Bulgaria) Elena Pampoulova	6–7^{(3)}, 2–6
Win	2.	28 April 1991	Villahermosa, Mexico	Hard	(Mexico) Isabela Petrov	7–5, 6–4
Loss	3.	27 September 1992	Guayaquil, Ecuador	Clay	(Venezuela) Ninfa Marra	3–6, 6–3, 2–6
Win	4.	6 September 1993	San Salvador, El Salvador	Clay	(Colombia) Cecilia Hincapié	6–3, 6–0
Win	5.	19 September 1993	Guadalajara, Mexico	Clay	(Mexico) Lucila Becerra	2–6, 6–4, 6–2
Loss	6.	26 September 1993	Guadalajara, Mexico	Clay	(Mexico) Lucila Becerra	4–6, 2–6

=== Doubles: 18 (15-3) ===
Result	No	Date	Tournament	Surface	Partner	Opponents	Score
Win	1.	6 June 1988	Key Biscayne, United States	Hard	(Mexico) Lucila Becerra	(France) Sophie Amiach (United States) Jennifer Santrock	6–4, 2–6, 7–5
Win	2.	17 July 1988	Guadalajara, Mexico	Clay	(Mexico) Lucila Becerra	(Mexico) Blanca Borbolla (Mexico) Aránzazu Gallardo	6–2, 6–1
Win	3.	25 July 1988	Mexico City, Mexico	Hard	(Mexico) Lucila Becerra	(United States) Jamie Pisarcik (Peru) Karim Strohmeier	6–4, 2–6, 6–4
Loss	4.	19 May 1991	San Luis Potosí, Mexico	Hard	(Mexico) Isabela Petrov	(Cuba) Rita Pichardo (Cuba) Belkis Rodríguez	4–6, 6–1, 3–6
Win	5.	26 May 1991	Aguascalientes, Mexico	Harf	(Mexico) Isabela Petrov	(Mexico) Aránzazu Gallardo (Mexico) Claudia Hernández	6–3, 7–6^{(4)}
Win	6.	8 December 1991	San Luis Potosí, Mexico	Hard	(Mexico) Angélica Gavaldón	(Germany) Cornelia Grünes (Philippines) Jean Lozano	6–2, 7–6^{(7)}
Loss	7.	30 August 1992	Querétaro, Mexico	Hard	(Mexico) Lucila Becerra	(Canada) Renata Kolbovic (Canada) Vanessa Webb	3–6, 2–6
Win	8.	6 September 1992	Toluca, Mexico	Hard	(Mexico) Lucila Becerra	(Canada) Renata Kolbovic (Canada) Vanessa Webb	7–6, 6–7, 7–5
Win	9.	13 April 1992	Mexico City, Mexico	Hard	(Mexico) Lucila Becerra	(Brazil) Cláudia Chabalgoity (Mexico) Isabela Petrov	6–3, 6–2
Win	10.	6 September 1993	San Salvador, El Salvador	Clay	(Colombia) Ximena Rodríguez	(Colombia) Carmiña Giraldo (Colombia) Cecilia Hincapié	6–2, 2–6, 6–4
Win	11.	19 September 1993	Guadalajara, Mexico	Clay	(Mexico) Lucila Becerra	(United States) Kellie Dorman-Tyrone (Republic of Ireland) Philippa Palmer	6–4, 6–2
Win	12.	3 October 1993	Monterrey, Mexico	Clay	(Mexico) Lucila Becerra	(United States) Happy Ho (Mexico) Claudia Muciño	6–2, 6–1
Win	13.	10 October 1993	Zacatecas City, Mexico	Hard	(Mexico) Lucila Becerra	(Colombia) Adriana Garcia (Cuba) Yoannis Montesino	6–1, 6–4
Win	14.	17 October 1993	Saltillo, Mexico	Hard	(Mexico) Lucila Becerra	(Mexico) Claudia Muciño (United States) Sylvia Schenck	7–6^{(11)}, 6–2
Loss	15.	11 July 1994	Toluca, Mexico	Hard	(United States) Kellie Dorman-Tyrone	(Mexico) Lucila Becerra (Mexico) Claudia Muciño	0–6, 4–6
Win	16.	25 September 1994	Guadalajara, Mexico	Clay	(Mexico) Lucila Becerra	(Cuba) Yoannis Montesino (Cuba) Belkis Rodríguez	6–3, 6–3
Win	17.	2 October 1994	Mexico City, Mexico	Hard	(Mexico) Lucila Becerra	(Mexico) Claudia Muciño (Costa Rica) Paula Umaña	6–4, 6-4
Win	18.	9 October 1994	Zacatecas, Mexico	Clay	(Mexico) Lucila Becerra	(Ecuador) María Dolores Campana (Mexico) Claudia Muciño	6–4, 6–4
