= 1994 Federation Cup Americas Zone – Pool D =

Group D of the 1994 Federation Cup Americas Zone was one of four pools in the Americas zone of the 1994 Federation Cup. Four teams competed in a round robin competition, with the top three teams advancing to the knockout stage.

	(Cuba) CUB	(Bolivia) BOL	(Guatemala) GUA	(Dominican Republic) DOM	RR; W–L	Set; W–L	Game; W–L	Standings
Cuba		2–1	3–0	3–0	3–0	16–3	103–44	1
Bolivia	1–2		3–0	3–0	2–1	14–5	97–51	2
Guatemala	0–3	0–3		3–0	1–2	7–12	63–91	3
Dominican Republic	0–3	0–3	0–3		0–3	1–18	34–111	4

== Cuba vs. Dominican Republic ==
Cuba
3
Cochabamba T.C, Cochabamba, Bolivia
11 April 1994
Clay (outdoors)

Dominican Republic
0

			1	2	3
1	(Cuba) (Dominican Republic)	Yoannis Montesino; Paula Álvarez	6; 3	6; 0
2	(Cuba) (Dominican Republic)	Belkis Rodríguez; Mónika Pimentel	6; 2	2; 6	6; 4
3	(Cuba) (Dominican Republic)	Yamile Cordova / Yoannis Montesino; Laura Hernández / Mónika Pimentel	6; 0	6; 0

== Bolivia vs. Guatemala ==
Bolivia
3
Cochabamba T.C, Cochabamba, Bolivia
11 April 1994
Clay (outdoors)

Guatemala
0

			1	2	3
1	(Bolivia) (Guatemala)	Carla Jiménez; Florea de María Urrea	6; 4	4; 6	6; 2
2	(Bolivia) (Guatemala)	Cecilia Ampuero; Alejandra Gómez	6; 1	6; 1
3	(Bolivia) (Guatemala)	Cecilia Ampuero / Sandra Kellemberger; Alejandra Gómez / Ana Rojas	6; 4	6; 0

== Cuba vs. Guatemala ==
Cuba
3
Cochabamba T.C, Cochabamba, Bolivia
12 April 1994
Clay (outdoors)

Guatemala
0

			1	2	3
1	(Cuba) (Guatemala)	Yamile Cordova; Florea de María Urrea	6; 3	6; 2
2	(Cuba) (Guatemala)	Belkis Rodríguez; Alejandra Gómez	6; 2	6; 1
3	(Cuba) (Guatemala)	Yoannis Montesino / Belkis Rodríguez; Ana Rojas / Florea de María Urrea	6; 0	6; 0

== Bolivia vs. Dominican Republic ==
Bolivia
3
Cochabamba T.C, Cochabamba, Bolivia
12 April 1994
Clay (outdoors)

Dominican Republic
0

			1	2	3
1	(Bolivia) (Dominican Republic)	Sandra Kellemberger; Laura Hernández	6; 1	6; 0
2	(Bolivia) (Dominican Republic)	Cecilia Ampuero; Mónika Pimentel	6; 0	6; 0
3	(Bolivia) (Dominican Republic)	María Alejandra Claure / Sandra Kellemberger; Mónika Pimentel / Paula Álvarez	6; 0	6; 3

== Cuba vs. Bolivia ==
Cuba
2
Cochabamba T.C, Cochabamba, Bolivia
13 April 1994
Clay (outdoors)

Bolivia
1

			1	2	3
1	(Cuba) (Bolivia)	Yoannis Montesino; Carla Jiménez	6; 0	7^{11} 6^{9}
2	(Cuba) (Bolivia)	Belkis Rodríguez; Cecilia Ampuero	2; 6	2; 6
3	(Cuba) (Bolivia)	Yoannis Montesino / Belkis Rodríguez; Cecilia Ampuero / Sandra Kellemberger	6; 3	6; 0

== Guatemala vs. Dominican Republic ==
Guatemala
3
Cochabamba T.C, Cochabamba, Bolivia
13 April 1994
Clay (outdoors)

Dominican Republic
0

			1	2	3
1	(Guatemala) (Dominican Republic)	Florea de María Urrea; Paula Álvarez	6; 0	6; 1
2	(Guatemala) (Dominican Republic)	Alejandra Gómez; Mónika Pimentel	6; 4	6; 3
3	(Guatemala) (Dominican Republic)	Alejandra Gómez / Florea de María Urrea; Laura Hernández / Mónika Pimentel	7^{7} 6^{5}	6; 1

== See also ==
- Fed Cup structure
