= Lucila Becerra =

Mexican tennis player

- Full name: Lucila Becerra González
- Country (sports): Mexico
- Born: 22 July 1965 (age 59)
- Prize money: $44,314

Singles
- Highest ranking: No. 253 (7 August 1995)

Doubles
- Highest ranking: No. 194 (10 July 1995)

Lucila "Lucy" Becerra González (Note: In this Spanish name, the first or paternal surname is Becerra and the second or maternal family name is González.) (born 22 July 1965) is a former professional tennis player from Mexico.

== Biography ==
=== Tennis career ===
Becerra reached a best singles ranking of 253 in the world and won nine professional titles on the ITF circuit. As a doubles player she was ranked as high as 194 and won 22 ITF titles.

A three-time Pan American Games medalist, Becerra won the mixed doubles gold at Indianapolis in 1987, to go with her women's doubles bronze medal in the same tournament. She won a further women's doubles bronze medal at the 1995 Pan American Games in Mar del Plata.

Her Fed Cup career for Mexico spanned 10 years and she appeared in a total of 15 ties. She won 11 matches overall, five in singles and six in doubles.

=== Personal life ===
Becerra lives in Mazatlán and is married with two children, twins Lucy and Mariano.

== ITF finals ==
=== Singles: 16 (9–7) ===
Result	No.	Date	Tournament	Surface	Opponent	Score
Loss	1.	3 August 1986	Querétaro, Mexico	Clay	(Mexico) Claudia Hernández	W/O
Loss	2.	24 July 1988	León, Mexico	Hard	(Peru) Karim Strohmeier	4–6, 2–6
Win	1.	31 July 1988	Mexico City, Mexico	Clay	(Mexico) Claudia Hernández	6–1, 6–3
Loss	3.	23 August 1992	Cuernavaca, Mexico	Hard	(France) Carole Lucarelli	3–6, 5–7
Loss	4.	5 October 1992	Mexico City, Mexico	Clay	(Czechoslovakia) Nora Kovařčíková	5–7, 7–5, 6–7
Win	2.	11 October 1992	Mexico City, Mexico	Clay	(Mexico) Alejandra Vallejo	6–2, 3–6, 6–1
Loss	5.	19 September 1993	Guadalajara, Mexico	Clay	(Mexico) Xóchitl Escobedo	6–2, 4–6, 2–6
Win	3.	26 September 1993	Guadalajara, Mexico	Clay	(Mexico) Xóchitl Escobedo	6–4, 6–2
Win	4.	3 October 1993	Monterrey, Mexico	Clay	(Cuba) Rita Pichardo	6–3, 7–5
Win	5.	10 October 1993	Zacatecas, Mexico	Hard	(Canada) Martina Nejedly	6–1, 6–1
Win	6.	17 October 1993	Saltillo, Mexico	Hard	(United States) Stephanie Reece	6–2, 7–6
Loss	6.	17 July 1994	Toluca, Mexico	Hard	(Japan) Miki Yokobori	4–6, 6–2, 2–6
Loss	7.	19 September 1994	Guadalajara, Mexico	Hard	(Mexico) Aránzazu Gallardo	6–4, 3–6, 1–6
Win	7.	26 September 1994	Guadalajara, Mexico	Clay	(Ecuador) María Dolores Campana	7–6^{(3)}, 6–1
Win	8.	3 October 1994	Zacatecas, Mexico	Hard	(Ecuador) María Dolores Campana	6–4, 6–2
Win	9.	24 July 1995	Salvador, Brazil	Hard	(United Kingdom) Lizzie Jelfs	6–4, 6–3

=== Doubles: 27 (22–5) ===
Result	No.	Date	Tournament	Surface	Partner	Opponents	Score
Win	1.	3 August 1986	Querétaro, Mexico	Clay	(Mexico) Maluca Llamas	(Mexico) Claudia Hernández (Mexico) Leticia Herrera	4–6, 6–4, 6–4
Win	2.	10 August 1986	León, Mexico	Clay	(Mexico) Maluca Llamas	(Mexico) Claudia Hernández (Mexico) Leticia Herrera	6–3, 6–3
Loss	1.	18 September 1986	Murcia, Spain	Clay	(Mexico) Maluca Llamas	(Finland) Anne Aallonen (Hong Kong) Patricia Hy	6–7, 3–6
Loss	2.	29 June 1987	Mexico City, Mexico	Hard	(Mexico) Maluca Llamas	(Netherlands) Carin Bakkum (Brazil) Themis Zambrzycki	3–6, 4–6
Win	3.	12 July 1987	San Luis Potosí, Mexico	Hard	(Mexico) Maluca Llamas	(Australia) Jackie Masters (New Zealand) Michelle Parun	6–4, 7–6
Loss	3.	7 March 1988	Castellón, Spain	Clay	(Mexico) Claudia Hernández	(Spain) Janet Souto (Spain) Ninoska Souto	6–4, 2–6, 2–6
Win	4.	6 June 1988	Key Biscayne, United States	Hard	(Mexico) Xóchitl Escobedo	(France) Sophie Amiach (United States) Jennifer Santrock	6–4, 2–6, 7–5
Win	5.	17 July 1988	Guadalajara, Mexico	Clay	(Mexico) Xóchitl Escobedo	(Mexico) Blanca Borbolla (Mexico) Aránzazu Gallardo	6–2, 6–1
Win	6.	25 July 1988	Mexico City, Mexico	Hard	(Mexico) Xóchitl Escobedo	(United States) Jamie Pisarcik (Peru) Karim Strohmeier	6–4, 2–6, 6–4
Loss	4.	3 June 1990	San Luis Potosí, Mexico	Hard	(Brazil) Themis Zambrzycki	(Philippines) Jean Lozano (Mexico) Lupita Novelo	3–6, 6–4, 1–6
Win	7.	9 March 1992	Monterrey, Mexico	Hard	(United States) Vincenza Procacci	(Cuba) Rita Pichardo (Cuba) Belkis Rodríguez	6–4, 6–4
Loss	5.	30 August 1992	Querétaro, Mexico	Hard	(Mexico) Xóchitl Escobedo	(Canada) Renata Kolbovic (Canada) Vanessa Webb	3–6, 2–6
Win	8.	6 September 1992	Toluca, Mexico	Hard	(Mexico) Xóchitl Escobedo	(Canada) Renata Kolbovic (Canada) Vanessa Webb	7–6, 6–7, 7–5
Win	9.	13 September 1992	Mexico City, Mexico	Clay	(Mexico) Xóchitl Escobedo	(Brazil) Cláudia Chabalgoity (Mexico) Isabela Petrov	6–3, 6–2
Win	10.	11 October 1992	Mexico City, Mexico	Clay	(Mexico) Claudia Muciño	(Mexico) Fanny Hernández (Mexico) Cynthia Ojeda	6–3, 6–1
Win	11.	19 September 1993	Guadalajara, Mexico	Clay	(Mexico) Xóchitl Escobedo	(United States) Kellie Dorman-Tyrone (Republic of Ireland) Philippa Palmer	6–4, 6–2
Win	12.	3 October 1993	Monterrey, Mexico	Clay	(Mexico) Xóchitl Escobedo	(United States) Happy Ho (Mexico) Claudia Muciño	6–2, 6–1
Win	13.	10 October 1993	Zacatecas City, Mexico	Hard	(Mexico) Xóchitl Escobedo	(Colombia) Adriana Garcia (Cuba) Yoannis Montesino	6–1, 6–4
Win	14.	17 October 1993	Saltillo, Mexico	Hard	(Mexico) Xóchitl Escobedo	(Mexico) Claudia Muciño (United States) Sylvia Schenck	7–6^{(11)}, 6–2
Win	15.	11 July 1994	Toluca, Mexico	Hard	(Mexico) Claudia Muciño	(United States) Kellie Dorman-Tyrone (Mexico) Xóchitl Escobedo	6–0, 6–4
Win	16.	18 July 1994	Mexico City, Mexico	Hard	(Mexico) Claudia Muciño	(Colombia) Ximena Rodríguez (Costa Rica) Paula Umaña	5–7, 6–4, 6–3
Win	17.	25 September 1994	Guadalajara, Mexico	Hard	(Mexico) Xóchitl Escobedo	(Cuba) Yoannis Montesino (Cuba) Belkis Rodríguez	6–3, 6–3
Win	18.	2 October 1994	Mexico City, Mexico	Hard	(Mexico) Xóchitl Escobedo	(Mexico) Claudia Muciño (Costa Rica) Paula Umaña	6–4, 6–4
Win	19.	9 October 1994	Zacatecas, Mexico	Clay	(Mexico) Xóchitl Escobedo	(Ecuador) María Dolores Campana (Mexico) Claudia Muciño	6–4, 6–4
Win	20.	25 June 1995	Toluca, Mexico	Hard	(Mexico) Jessica Fernández	(United States) Tracey Hiete (Canada) Renata Kolbovic	6–4, 6–4
Win	21.	22 June 1997	Chetumal, Mexico	Hard	(Mexico) Ana Paola Gonzalez	(Mexico) Alejandra Hernández (United States) Rochelle Raiss	6–4, 6–3
Win	22.	27 October 1997	Culiacan, Mexico	Hard	(Mexico) Isabela Petrov	(Mexico) Paola Arrangoiz (Russia) Alina Jidkova	7–5, 6–0
