= Helene Kappler =

Venezuelan tennis player (born 1973)

- Full name: Helene Kappler-Palmiotto
- Country (sports): Venezuela
- Born: 15 March 1973 (age 52)

Singles
- Career record: 17–25
- Highest ranking: No. 524 (11 Nov 1991)

Doubles
- Career record: 11–19
- Highest ranking: No. 437 (11 Nov 1991)
Medal record
Central American and Caribbean Games
Bronze medal – third place	1993 Ponce	Team

Helene Kappler-Palmiotto (born 15 March 1973) is a Venezuelan former professional tennis player.

Kappler appeared in five Federation Cup ties for Venezuela, all in 1992. She partnered with Eleonora Vegliante for three wins and two losses in doubles rubbers. Her only singles rubber was a loss to Mexico's Angélica Gavaldón.

In 1993 she won a bronze medal at the Central American and Caribbean Games in Ponce, along with María Virginia Francesa and Ninfa Marra in the team event.

== ITF finals ==
=== Doubles: 2 (0–2) ===
Result	No.	Date	Tournament	Surface	Partner	Opponents	Score
Loss	1.	12 May 1991	Mexico City, Mexico	Hard	(Mexico) Claudia Rodríguez	(Mexico) Claudia Hernández (Mexico) Aránzazu Gallardo	6–3, 5–7, 6–7^{(2)}
Loss	2.	13 October 1991	Santiago, Chile	Clay	(Venezuela) Eleonora Vegliante	(Chile) Paulina Sepúlveda (Chile) Paula Cabezas	5–7, 6–2, 4–6
