= Claudia Muciño =

Mexican tennis player

- Country (sports): Mexico
- Born: 16 December 1971 (age 53)
- Plays: Right-handed
- Prize money: $13,143

Singles
- Career record: 9–56
- Highest ranking: No. 623 (2 October 1995)

Doubles
- Career record: 69–57
- Career titles: 6 ITF
- Highest ranking: No. 254 (26 June 1995)

Claudia Muciño (born 16 December 1971) is a Mexican former professional tennis player.

A right-handed player, Muciño appeared in five ties for Mexico as a doubles player in the 1994 Federation Cup.

Muciño won six ITF doubles titles while competing on the professional tour and played college tennis at Brenau University in the United States, earning NAIA All American honours in 1997.

== ITF finals ==
=== Doubles: 13 (6–7) ===
Outcome	No.	Date	Tournament	Surface	Partner	Opponents	Score
Winner	1.	11 October 1992	Mexico City, Mexico	Clay	(Mexico) Lucila Becerra	(Mexico) Fanny Hernández (Mexico) Cynthia Ojeda	6–3, 6–1
Runner-up	1.	3 March 1993	Monterrey, Mexico	Clay	(United States) Happy Ho	(Brazil) Caroline Schuck (Brazil) Eugenia Maia	6–7^{(6)}, 1–6
Runner-up	2.	10 May 1993	Torreón, Mexico	Hard	(United States) Sylvia Schenck	(Mexico) Xóchitl Escobedo (Mexico) Lucila Becerra	6–7^{(11–13)}, 2–6
Runner-up	3.	27 September 1993	Guadalajara, Mexico	Clay	(United States) Happy Ho	(Mexico) Lucila Becerra (Mexico) Xóchitl Escobedo	2–6, 1–6
Runner-up	4.	13 March 1994	Monterrey, Mexico	Hard	(United States) Sylvia Schenck	(Mexico) Sophie Cortina (Socialist Federal Republic of Yugoslavia) Natalja Vojinović	5–7, 6–2, 4–6
Runner-up	5.	16 May 1994	Guadalajara, Mexico	Clay	(Costa Rica) Paula Umaña	(Mexico) Xóchitl Escobedo (Mexico) Lucila Becerra	4–6, 4–6
Winner	2.	20 June 1994	Toluca, Mexico	Hard	(Mexico) Lucila Becerra	(United States) Kellie Dorman-Tyrone (Mexico) Xóchitl Escobedo	6–0, 6–4
Winner	3.	18 July 1994	Mexico City, Mexico	Hard	(Mexico) Lucila Becerra	(Costa Rica) Paula Umaña (Colombia) Ximena Rodríguez	5–7, 6–4, 6–3
Runner-up	6.	3 October 1994	Zacatecas, Mexico	Clay	(Ecuador) María Dolores Campana	(Mexico) Xóchitl Escobedo (Mexico) Lucila Becerra	4–6, 4–6
Winner	4.	26 March 1995	Monterrey, Mexico	Hard	(United States) Sylvia Schenck	(Japan) Mayuko Koshiba (United States) Mindy Weiner	6–2, 7–6^{(3)}
Winner	5.	1 April 1996	Tampico, Mexico	Clay	(Dominican Republic) Joelle Schad	(Cuba) Yoannis Montesino (Cuba) Belkis Rodríguez	6–2, 6–3
Runner-up	7.	20 October 1996	Coatzacoalcos, Mexico	Hard	(Ecuador) María Dolores Campana	(United States) Tracey Hiete (Canada) Renata Kolbovic	3–6, 3–6
Winner	6.	27 October 1996	Puebla, Mexico	Hard	(Ecuador) María Dolores Campana	(United States) Aurora Gima (Mexico) Ana Paola González	6–1, 6–3
