= Stephanie Mayorkis =

Brazilian tennis player

- Country (sports): Brazil
- Born: 4 March 1971 (age 54)
- Prize money: $18,485

Singles
- Career record: 61–70
- Highest ranking: No. 312 (12 Jul 1993)

Doubles
- Career record: 37–48
- Career titles: 1 ITF
- Highest ranking: No. 289 (29 Nov 1993)

Stephanie Mayorkis (born 4 March 1971) is a Brazilian former professional tennis player.

Mayorkis reached a career high ranking of 312 in the world while competing on the professional tour. She played Federation Cup tennis for Brazil in 1992 and was unbeaten in her two singles and two doubles rubbers. In 1993 she featured in the main draw of the Curitaba WTA Tour tournament.

== ITF finals ==
=== Singles: 1 (0–1) ===
Outcome	No.	Date	Tournament	Surface	Opponent	Score
Runner-up	1.	9 October 1988	Lima, Peru	Clay	(Cuba) Iluminada Concepción	3–6, 0–6

=== Doubles: 3 (1–2) ===
Outcome	No.	Date	Tournament	Surface	Partner	Opponents	Score
Runner-up	1.	5 November 1989	Belo Horizonte, Brazil	Clay	(Brazil) Christina Rozwadowski	(Brazil) Roberta Burzagli (Brazil) Lucia Peria	
Winner	1.	24 June 1990	Madeira, Portugal	Hard	(West Germany) Cora Linneman	(Canada) Monica Mraz (Netherlands) Petra Kamstra	6–4, 7–5
Runner-up	2.	25 August 1991	Manaus, Brazil	Hard	(Brazil) Christina Rozwadowski	(Brazil) Eugenia Maia (Brazil) Roberta Burzagli	4–6, 6–7^{(3)}
