= Déborah Gaviria =

Peruvian tennis player

- Country (sports): Peru
- Born: 14 November 1978 (age 46); Lima, Peru
- Plays: Right-handed

Singles
- Career record: 12–12
- Highest ranking: No. 635 (16 Oct 1995)

Doubles
- Career record: 8–11
- Highest ranking: No. 512 (18 Sep 1995)
Medal record
South American Games
| Bronze medal – third place | 1994 Valencia | Singles |

Déborah Gaviria (born 14 November 1978) is a Peruvian former professional tennis player.

Born in Lima, Gaviria competed on the international tour in the 1990s. She had a career high singles ranking of 635 and a best doubles ranking of 512 in the world.

Between 1994 and 1996 she featured in a total of 13 Fed Cup ties for Peru, winning seven singles and three doubles rubbers. She also represented Peru at the South American Games and was a singles bronze medalist at the 1994 tournament, held in Valencia, Venezuela.

== ITF finals ==
=== Doubles: 1 (0–1) ===
| Outcome | No. | Date | Tournament | Surface | Partner | Opponents | Score |
|---|---|---|---|---|---|---|---|
| Runner-up | 1. | 3 September 1995 | San Salvador, El Salvador | Clay | (Mexico) Cristina Cortes | (Ecuador) María Cristina Campana (Ecuador) María Dolores Campana | 6–4, 4–6, 3–6 |
