= Eugenia Maia =

Brazilian tennis player

- Country (sports): Brazil
- Born: 26 April 1974 (age 51)
- Prize money: $33,048

Singles
- Highest ranking: No. 316 (2 December 1996)

Doubles
- Career titles: 7 ITF
- Highest ranking: No. 200 (5 August 1996)

Eugenia Maia (born 26 April 1974) is a Brazilian former professional tennis player.

Maia competed on the professional tour in the 1990s and won seven ITF doubles titles.

In both 1996 and 1997 she was a member of the Brazil Fed Cup team, playing singles in a total of five ties.

== ITF Circuit finals ==
$25,000 tournaments
$10,000 tournaments

=== Singles: 3 (0–3) ===
Outcome	No.	Date	Tournament	Surface	Opponent	Score
Runner-up	1.	28 November 1994	São Paulo, Brazil	Hard	(Brazil) Luciana Tella	3–6, 2–6
Runner-up	2.	4 September 1995	Medellín, Colombia	Clay	(Argentina) Mariana Díaz Oliva	4–6, 1–6
Runner-up	3.	11 December 1995	São Paulo, Brazil	Clay	(United States) Meghann Shaughnessy	1–6, 1–6

=== Doubles: 14 (7–7) ===
Outcome	No.	Date	Tournament	Surface	Partner	Opponents	Score
Runner-up	1.	12 August 1991	Belém, Brazil	Hard	(Brazil) Roberta Burzagli	(Brazil) Alessandra Kaul (Brazil) Denia Salu	7–6^{(4)}, 3–6, 4–6
Winner	1.	19 August 1991	Manaus, Brazil	Hard	(Brazil) Roberta Burzagli	(Brazil) Stephanie Mayorkis (Brazil) Christina Rozwadowski	6–4, 7–6^{(3)}
Runner-up	2.	26 August 1991	Belo Horizonte, Brazil	Clay	(Brazil) Roberta Burzagli	(Brazil) Denia Salu (Brazil) Andrea Vieira	6–4, 5–7, 4–6
Winner	2.	3 March 1993	Monterrey, Mexico	Clay	(Brazil) Caroline Schuck	(United States) Happy Ho (Mexico) Claudia Muciño	7–6^{(6)}, 6–1
Winner	3.	4 September 1995	Medellín, Colombia	Clay	(Argentina) Mariana Díaz Oliva	(Colombia) Ximena Rodríguez (United Kingdom) Joanne Moore	6–3, 6–2
Winner	4.	18 September 1995	Manizales, Colombia	Clay	(Argentina) Mariana Díaz Oliva	(Colombia) Ximena Rodríguez (United Kingdom) Joanne Moore	6–4, 6–3
Runner-up	3.	25 September 1995	Guayaquil, Ecuador	Clay	(Argentina) Mariana Díaz Oliva	(Chile) Bárbara Castro (Chile) María-Alejandra Quezada	6–7^{(5)}, 1–6
Runner-up	4.	20 November 1995	São Paulo, Brazil	Clay	(Brazil) Luciana Tella	(Brazil) Vanessa Menga (Brazil) Andrea Vieira	6–7^{(3)}, 3–6
Winner	5.	24 June 1996	Campo Grande, Brazil	Hard	(Brazil) Vanessa Menga	(Brazil) Cristina Ferreira (Brazil) Suzana Rodriguez	1–6, 6–3, 6–3
Runner-up	5.	14 December 1997	Bogotá, Colombia	Clay	(Paraguay) Larissa Schaerer	(Brazil) Miriam D'Agostini (Brazil) Vanessa Menga	2–6, 2–6
Winner	6.	3 May 1998	San Severo, Italy	Clay	(Argentina) Romina Ottoboni	(Colombia) Giana Gutiérrez (Argentina) Veronica Stele	1–6, 7–5, 7–5
Runner-up	6.	26 July 1998	Lido di Camaiore, Italy	Clay	(Colombia) Giana Gutiérrez	(Czech Republic) Zuzana Hejdová (Croatia) Marijana Kovačević	2–6, 0–6
Runner-up	7.	5 October 1998	Montevideo, Uruguay	Hard	(Brazil) Joana Cortez	(Hungary) Zsófia Gubacsi (Argentina) Mariana López Palacios	6–3, 3–6, 4–6
Winner	7.	30 August 1999	San Juan, Argentina	Clay	(Argentina) Romina Ottoboni	(Uruguay) Virginia Sadi (Uruguay) Daniela Olivera	6–2, 6–2
