= Paulina Sepúlveda =

Chilean tennis player

- Country (sports): Chile
- Born: 15 September 1968 (age 57)
- Prize money: $11,067

Singles
- Highest ranking: No. 346 (5 July 1993)

Doubles
- Highest ranking: No. 377 (7 June 1993)

Paulina Sepúlveda (born 15 September 1968) is a Chilean former professional tennis player.

== Biography ==
Sepúlveda made her debut for the Chile Fed Cup team as a 15-year old in 1984. She continued to play in the Fed Cup during her junior career and was a girls' singles quarter-finalist at the 1986 Wimbledon Championships.

At the 1991 Pan American Games in Havana, Sepúlveda won a bronze medal in the women's doubles event, partnering Paula Cabezas.

Following a five-year absence, she returned to Fed Cup tennis in 1992, in the lead up to the 1992 Barcelona Olympics, which she qualified for as a singles player. She was beaten in the first round of the Olympics by Sandra Cecchini.

In 1996 she made another Fed Cup comeback and finished her career with appearances in a total of 16 ties.

== ITF finals ==
=== Singles (2–1) ===
Result	No.	Date	Tournament	Surface	Opponent	Score
Loss	1.	13 September 1992	Caracas, Venezuela	Clay	(Brazil) Sumara Passos	1–6, 3–6
Win	1.	28 September 1992	Lima, Peru	Clay	(Paraguay) Magalí Benítez	6–1, 6–4
Win	2.	18 October 1992	Santiago, Chile	Clay	(Venezuela) Ninfa Marra	6–4, 6–3

=== Doubles (2–0) ===
Result	No.	Date	Tournament	Surface	Partner	Opponents	Score
Win	1.	13 October 1991	Santiago, Chile	Clay	(Chile) Paula Cabezas	(Venezuela) Helene Kappler (Venezuela) Eleonora Vegliante	7–5, 2–6, 6–4
Win	2.	29 November 1992	Buenos Aires, Argentina	Clay	(Chile) Paula Cabezas	(Argentina) Mariana Randrup (Argentina) Gretel Gonzalez-Glanzmann	6–2, 6–1
