= 1992 Federation Cup Americas Zone – Pool C =

Within women's tennis competitions, the Group C of the 1992 Federation Cup Americas Zone was one of four pools in the Americas zone of the 1992 Federation Cup. Four teams competed in a round robin competition, with the top two teams advancing to the knockout stage..

	(Cuba) CUB	(Colombia) COL	(Bolivia) BOL	(Dominican Republic) DOM	RR; W–L	Set; W–L	Game; W–L	Standings
Cuba		3–0	2–0	3–0	3–0	16–2	105–43	1
Colombia	0–3		2–1	3–0	2–1	11–9	94–70	2
Bolivia	0–2	1–2		3–0	1–2	10–8	78–66	3
Dominican Republic	0–3	0–3	0–3		0–3	0–18	10–108	4

== Cuba vs. Colombia ==
Cuba
3
Atlas Colomos T.C, Guadalajara, Mexico
21 April 1992
Clay (outdoors)

Colombia
0

			1	2	3
1	(Cuba) (Colombia)	Belkis Rodríguez; Catalina Ramírez	4; 6	6; 2	7; 5
2	(Cuba) (Colombia)	Rita Pichardo; Giana Gutiérrez	6; 4	6; 3
3	(Cuba) (Colombia)	Rita Pichardo / Belkis Rodríguez; Giana Gutiérrez / Carolina Torres	6; 0	6; 4

== Bolivia vs. Dominican Republic ==
Bolivia
3
Atlas Colomos T.C, Guadalajara, Mexico
21 April 1992
Clay (outdoors)

Dominican Republic
0

			1	2	3
1	(Bolivia) (Dominican Republic)	Sandra Kellemberger; Paula Álvarez	6; 0	6; 2
2	(Bolivia) (Dominican Republic)	Cecilia Ampuero; Patricia Rodríguez	6; 1	6; 0
3	(Bolivia) (Dominican Republic)	Cecilia Ampuero / Sandra Kellemberger; Patricia Rodríguez / Rosanna Valério	6; 0	6; 1

== Colombia vs. Bolivia ==
Colombia
2
Atlas Colomos T.C, Guadalajara, Mexico
22 April 1992
Clay (outdoors)

Bolivia
1

			1	2	3
1	(Colombia) (Bolivia)	Giana Gutiérrez; Sandra Kellemberger	6; 1	6; 2
2	(Colombia) (Bolivia)	Carolina Torres; Cecilia Ampuero	3; 6	2; 6
3	(Colombia) (Bolivia)	Giana Gutiérrez / Carolina Torres; Cecilia Ampuero / Sandra Kellemberger	6; 2	5; 7	6; 0

== Cuba vs. Dominican Republic ==
Cuba
3
Atlas Colomos T.C, Guadalajara, Mexico
22 April 1992
Clay (outdoors)

Dominican Republic
0

			1	2	3
1	(Cuba) (Dominican Republic)	Belkis Rodríguez; Rosanna Valério	6; 0	6; 0
2	(Cuba) (Dominican Republic)	Rita Pichardo; Patricia Rodríguez	6; 1	6; 0
3	(Cuba) (Dominican Republic)	Iluminada Concepción / Yoannis Montesino; Patricia Rodríguez / Paula Álvarez	6; 0	6; 0

== Cuba vs. Bolivia ==
Cuba
2
Atlas Colomos T.C, Guadalajara, Mexico
23 April 1992
Clay (outdoors)

Bolivia
0

			1	2	3
1	(Cuba) (Bolivia)	Belkis Rodríguez; Sandra Kellemberger	6; 2	6; 1
2	(Cuba) (Bolivia)	Rita Pichardo; Cecilia Ampuero	3; 6	7; 5	6; 4
3	(Cuba) (Bolivia)					not played

== Colombia vs. Dominican Republic ==
Colombia
3
Atlas Colomos T.C, Guadalajara, Mexico
23 April 1992
Clay (outdoors)

Dominican Republic
0

			1	2	3
1	(Colombia) (Dominican Republic)	Carmiña Giraldo; Paula Álvarez	6; 0	6; 0
2	(Colombia) (Dominican Republic)	Catalina Ramírez; Patricia Rodríguez	6; 1	6; 2
3	(Colombia) (Dominican Republic)	Carmiña Giraldo / Carolina Torres; Rosanna Valério / Paula Álvarez	6; 0	6; 2

== See also ==
- Fed Cup structure
