= Isabela Petrov =

Mexican tennis player

- Full name: Isabela Petrov Iantosca
- Country (sports): Mexico
- Born: 9 June 1973 (age 52); Mexico City, Mexico
- Prize money: $15,964

Singles
- Career record: 59–50
- Career titles: 1 ITF
- Highest ranking: No. 359 (14 June 1993)

Doubles
- Career record: 31–35
- Career titles: 3 ITF
- Highest ranking: No. 259 (22 February 1993)

Team competitions
- Fed Cup: 6–3

Isabela Petrov Iantosca (born 9 June 1973) is a former professional tennis player from Mexico.

== Biography ==
Petrov, who was born in Mexico City, won a bronze medal for Mexico in the women's doubles tournament at the 1991 Pan American Games in Havana.

From 1991 to 1993, she featured in nine Fed Cup ties for her native country. Receiving a full scholarship to attend Pepperdine University, Petrov played NCAA Division I tennis for the Waves, earning All-American honors in 1996 and 1997.

Since 2000 she has worked in marketing for ESPN International in New York.

== ITF finals ==
$25,000 tournaments
$10,000 tournaments

=== Singles: 3 (1–2) ===
Result	No.	Date	Tournament	Surface	Opponent	Score
Loss	1.	28 April 1991	ITF Villahermosa, Mexico	Hard	(Mexico) Xóchitl Escobedo	5–7, 4–6
Win	1.	14 March 1993	ITF Monterrey, Mexico	Clay	(United States) Sandra De Silva	7–5, 6–3
Loss	2.	13 October 1997	ITF Coatzacoalcos, Mexico	Hard	(Slovakia) Alena Paulenková	6–7^{(6)}, 6–7^{(3)}

=== Doubles: 7 (3–4) ===
Result	No.	Date	Tournament	Surface	Partner	Opponents	Score
Loss	1.	22 April 1991	ITF Villahermosa, Mexico	Hard	(Mexico) Olga Limon	(Cuba) Rita Pichardo (Cuba) Belkis Rodríguez	4–6, 7–5, 6–7^{(5)}
Loss	2.	19 May 1991	ITF San Luis Potosí, Mexico	Hard	(Mexico) Xóchitl Escobedo	(Cuba) Rita Pichardo (Cuba) Belkis Rodríguez	4–6, 6–1, 3–6
Win	1.	26 May 1991	ITF Aguascalientes, Mexico	Harf	(Mexico) Xóchitl Escobedo	(Mexico) Aránzazu Gallardo (Mexico) Claudia Hernández	6–3, 7–6^{(4)}
Loss	3.	13 April 1992	ITF Mexico City	Hard	(Brazil) Cláudia Chabalgoity	(Mexico) Lucila Becerra (Mexico) Xóchitl Escobedo	3–6, 2–6
Win	2.	23 August 1992	ITF Cuernavaca, Mexico	Hard	(Brazil) Cláudia Chabalgoity	(South Africa) Estelle Gevers (South Africa) Liezel Huber	7–5, 5–7, 6–2
Loss	4.	19 October 1992	ITF San Luis Potosí, Mexico	Hard	(United States) Jolene Watanabe	(Poland) Magdalena Feistel (Poland) Katarzyna Teodorowicz	6–4, 4–6, 4–6
Win	3.	27 October 1997	ITF Culiacan, Mexico	Hard	(Mexico) Lucila Becerra	(Mexico) Paola Arrangoiz (Russia) Alina Jidkova	7–5, 6–0
