= Eleonora Vegliante =

Venezuelan tennis player (born 1973)

- Country (sports): Venezuela
- Born: 21 July 1973 (age 52)

Singles
- Career record: 15–19
- Highest ranking: No. 550 (5 Oct 1992)

Doubles
- Career record: 28–20
- Career titles: 1 ITF
- Highest ranking: No. 325 (23 Nov 1992)
Medal record
Central American and Caribbean Games
| Bronze medal – third place | 1990 Mexico City | Team |

Eleonora Vegliante (born 21 July 1973) is a Venezuelan former professional tennis player.

A Central American and Caribbean Games bronze medalist for Venezuela, Vegliante competed for her nation's Federation Cup team between 1990 and 1993, appearing in a total of 11 ties. She won four singles and five doubles rubbers.

Vegliante later played tennis for Campbell University and now lives in Atlanta, Georgia.

== ITF finals ==
=== Doubles: 3 (1–2) ===
| Result | No. | Date | Tournament | Surface | Partner | Opponents | Score |
|---|---|---|---|---|---|---|---|
| Loss | 1. | 13 October 1991 | Santiago, Chile | Clay | (Venezuela) Helene Kappler | (Chile) Paulina Sepúlveda (Chile) Paula Cabezas | 5–7, 6–2, 4–6 |
| Win | 1. | 4 October 1992 | Lima, Peru | Clay | (Ecuador) María Dolores Campana | (Poland) Anna Moll (Poland) Katarzyna Malec | 5–7, 7–5, 6–2 |
| Loss | 2. | 12 September 1993 | Caracas, Venezuela | Clay | (Ecuador) María Dolores Campana | (Cuba) Belkis Rodríguez (Cuba) Yoannis Montesino | 0–6, 1–6 |
