= Paula Umaña =

Costa Rican tennis player

- Country (sports): Costa Rica
- Born: 10 September 1974 (age 50)
- Plays: Right-handed
- Prize money: $8,307

Singles
- Career record: 17–42
- Highest ranking: No. 624 (7 November 1994)

Doubles
- Career record: 31–40
- Highest ranking: No. 281 (17 July 1995)

Paula Umaña (born 10 September 1974) is a Costa Rican former professional tennis player.

Between 1992 and 2000, Umaña represented the Costa Rica Fed Cup team in a total of 33 ties, winning nine singles and ten doubles rubbers for her country.

Umaña, who now lives in the US state of Georgia, is a younger sister of CNN en Español anchor Glenda Umaña.

Umaña is a Catholic speaker and author of 40 Gifts of Hope (40 Regalos de Esperanza).

== ITF finals ==
$25,000 tournaments
$10,000 tournaments

=== Doubles: 4 (0–4) ===
Outcome	No.	Date	Tournament	Surface	Partner	Opponents	Score
Runner-up	1.	24 July 1994	Mexico City, Mexico	Hard	(Colombia) Ximena Rodríguez	(Mexico) Lucila Becerra (Mexico) Claudia Muciño	7–5, 4–6, 3–6
Runner-up	2.	2 October 1994	Monterrey, Mexico	Clay	(Mexico) Claudia Muciño	(Mexico) Xóchitl Escobedo (Mexico) Lucila Becerra	4–6, 4–6
Runner-up	3.	16 October 1994	Saltillo, Mexico	Hard	(Jamaica) Iwalani McCalla	(United States) Laxmi Poruri (United States) Eleni Rossides	1–6, 1–6
Runner-up	4.	4 December 1994	São Paulo, Brazil	Hard	(Colombia) Carmiña Giraldo	(Brazil) Vanessa Menga (Brazil) Luciana Tella	2–6, 3–6
