= Graciela Vélez =

Mexican tennis player

- Full name: Graciela Vélez Valdez
- Country (sports): Mexico
- Born: 29 June 1977 (age 48)
- Prize money: $16,877

Singles
- Career record: 71–62
- Career titles: 1 ITF
- Highest ranking: No. 353 (20 February 1995)

Doubles
- Career record: 43–38
- Career titles: 2 ITF
- Highest ranking: No. 331 (17 October 1994)

Graciela Vélez Valdez (born 29 June 1977) is a Mexican former professional tennis player.

Valdez represented the Mexico Fed Cup team in 14 ties, between 1994 and 2004, winning three singles and seven doubles rubbers. She was a two-time silver medalist for Mexico at the Central American and Caribbean Games.

== ITF finals ==
=== Singles: 2 (1–1) ===
Outcome	No.	Date	Tournament	Surface	Opponent	Score
Winner	1.	25 September 1994	Guadalajara, Mexico	Hard	(Mexico) Karin Palme	6–2, 6–3
Runner-up	1.	5 October 2003	Guadalajara, Mexico	Clay	(Brazil) Carla Tiene	4–6, 1–6

=== Doubles: 5 (2–3) ===
Outcome	No.	Date	Tournament	Surface	Partner	Opponents	Score
Runner-up	1.	18 October 1993	Chihuahua, Mexico	Hard	(Mexico) Monica Bonilla	(Czech Republic) Soňa Málková (Slovenia) Tjaša Jezernik	6–7^{(1–7)}, 1–6
Runner-up	2.	25 September 1994	Guadalajara, Mexico	Hard	(Brazil) Sumara Passos	(Mexico) Aranzazu Gallardo (Mexico) Ana Paola González	4–6, 2–6
Winner	1.	26 August 1996	San Salvador, El Salvador	Clay	(Ecuador) Nuria Niemes	(United Kingdom) Joanne Moore (United States) Kristine Kurth	7–5, 1–6, 6–1
Runner-up	3.	23 March 1997	Victoria, Mexico	Hard	(Mexico) Karin Palme	(Mexico) Paola Arrangoiz (Russia) Alina Jidkova	7–5, 0–6, 2–6
Winner	2.	14 June 2002	Pachuca, Mexico	Clay	(Mexico) Erika Clarke	(Argentina) Celeste Contín (Uruguay) Ana Lucía Migliarini de León	6–0, 6–1
