= Karin Palme =

Mexican tennis player

- Country (sports): Mexico
- Born: 27 December 1977; Guadalajara, Mexico
- Died: 10 February 2024 (aged 46)
- Plays: Right-handed
- Prize money: $41,521

Singles
- Career titles: 1 ITF
- Highest ranking: No. 315 (5 December 1994)

Doubles
- Career titles: 3 ITF
- Highest ranking: No. 270 (13 October 1997)

Karin Palme (27 December 1977 - 10 February 2024) was a former professional tennis player from Mexico.

== Biography ==
Born in Guadalajara, Palme made her debut for the Mexico Fed Cup team in 1994. She played Fed Cup ever year up until 1999, by which time she was in her second season of college tennis at Arizona State University. In 2000 she earned All-American honors for singles.

After graduating she continued to compete on the professional tour and represent Mexico in international events. She won two medals at the 2002 Central American and Caribbean Games and was a doubles bronze medalist at the 2003 Pan American Games in Santo Domingo.

In 2003 she made a comeback to Fed Cup tennis for a further two ties, finishing her career with appearances in 26 ties, second only to Jessica Fernández.

In 2024, Palme died.

== ITF finals ==
$25,000 tournaments
$10,000 tournaments

=== Singles (1–4) ===
Result	No.	Date	Tournament	Surface	Opponent	Score
Win	1.	24 July 1994	Mexico City	Hard	(Mexico) Jessica Fernández	6–0, 6–3
Loss	1.	25 September 1994	Guadalajara, Mexico	Hard	(Mexico) Graciela Vélez	2–6, 3–6
Loss	2.	20 February 1995	Cali, Colombia	Clay	(Colombia) Fabiola Zuluaga	0–6, 4–6
Loss	3.	20 October 1996	Coatzacoalcos, Mexico	Hard	(Chile) Paula Cabezas	7–5, 5–7, 2–6
Loss	4.	14 June 2002	Pachuca, Mexico	Clay	(Uruguay) Ana Lucía Migliarini de León	1–6, 6–4, 5–7

=== Doubles (3–3) ===
Result	No.	Date	Tournament	Surface	Partner	Opponents	Score
Loss	1.	7 October 1996	Mexico City	Hard	(Slovakia) Alena Paulenková	(United States) Tracey Hiete (Canada) Renata Kolbovic	3–6, 7–5, 4–6
Loss	2.	23 March 1997	Victoria, Mexico	Hard	(Mexico) Graciela Vélez	(Mexico) Paola Arrangoiz (Russia) Alina Jidkova	7–5, 0–6, 2–6
Win	1.	8 September 1997	La Paz, Bolivia	Clay	(Czech Republic) Monika Maštalířová	(Argentina) Mariana Lopez Palacios (Argentina) Laura Montalvo	4–6, 6–3, 6–2
Loss	3.	21 June 1998	Mount Pleasant, United States	Hard	(United States) Adria Engel	(United States) Keri Phebus (Canada) Vanessa Webb	2–6, 1–6
Win	2.	6 August 2001	Poza Rica, Mexico	Hard	(Japan) Remi Uda	(Mexico) Erika Clarke (Mexico) Alejandra Rivero	6–2, 6–3
Win	3.	25 August 2002	San Luis Potosí, Mexico	Hard	(United States) Arpi Kojian	(Mexico) Erika Clarke (Mexico) Alejandra Rivero	6–7, 6–3, 7–6
