= María Dolores Campana =

Ecuadorian tennis player (born 1975)

- Country (sports): Ecuador
- Born: 5 April 1975 (age 51) Quito, Ecuador
- Prize money: $32,765

Singles
- Career titles: 4 ITF
- Highest ranking: No. 287 (27 February 1995)

Doubles
- Career titles: 8 ITF
- Highest ranking: No. 220 (6 March 1995)

María Dolores Campana (born 5 April 1975) is an Ecuadorian former professional tennis player.

== Biography ==
Born in Quito, Campana competed on the professional tour in the 1990s and reached a best singles ranking of 287 in the world. She made her only WTA Tour main draw appearance at the 1995 Zagreb Open, where she featured in the doubles.

During her career she was a regular member of the Ecuador Fed Cup team and is the country's most successful Fed Cup player, with 28 overall wins, 20 of which came in singles.

Campana now lives in Guayaquil and has two daughters. Her elder brother is Ecuadorian politician Pablo Campana, who was also a tennis player.

== ITF finals ==
=== Singles: 8 (4–4) ===
Result	No.	Date	Tournament	Surface	Opponent	Score
Loss	1.	27 September 1993	Santo Domingo, Dominican Republic	Clay	(Hungary) Virág Csurgó	3–6, 6–7^{(3)}
Win	1.	4 October 1993	La Paz, Bolivia	Clay	(Bolivia) Cecilia Ampuero	3–6, 6–4, 7–5
Win	2.	15 November 1993	San Salvador, El Salvador	Hard	(Colombia) Carmiña Giraldo	6–1, 4–6, 6–3
Win	3.	29 August 1994	San Salvador, El Salvador	Clay	(Chinese Taipei) Julie Huang	7–6^{(5)}, 6–3
Loss	2.	26 September 1994	Guadalajara, Mexico	Clay	(Mexico) Lucila Becerra	6–7^{(3)}, 1–6
Loss	3.	3 October 1994	Zacatecas, Mexico	Hard	(Mexico) Lucila Becerra	4–6, 2–6
Win	4.	21 October 1996	Puebla, Mexico	Hard	(Canada) Renata Kolbovic	2–6, 6–2, 6–2
Loss	4.	11 November 1996	San Salvador, El Salvador	Clay	(Indonesia) Liza Andriyani	3–6, 4–6

=== Doubles: 18 (8–10) ===
Result	No.	Date	Tournament	Surface	Partner	Opponents	Score
Loss	1.	9 September 1991	Guayaquil, Ecuador	Clay	(Chile) Macarena Miranda	(Chile) Paula Cabezas (Ecuador) Nuria Niemes	1–6, 5–7
Loss	2.	23 September 1991	Lima, Peru	Clay	(Brazil) Janaina Mercadante	(Paraguay) Larissa Schaerer (Paraguay) Rossana de los Ríos	2–6, 3–6
Win	1.	28 September 1992	Lima, Peru	Clay	(Venezuela) Eleonora Vegliante	(Poland) Anna Moll (Poland) Katarzyna Malec	5–7, 7–5, 6–2
Loss	3.	6 September 1993	Caracas, Venezuela	Clay	(Venezuela) Eleonora Vegliante	(Cuba) Belkis Rodríguez (Cuba) Yoannis Montesino	0–6, 1–6
Win	2.	13 September 1993	Bogotá, Colombia	Clay	(Greece) Christina Zachariadou	(Paraguay) Magalí Benítez (Chile) Bárbara Castro	6–3, 6–2
Loss	4.	27 September 1993	Santo Domingo, Dominican Republic	Clay	(Ecuador) Nuria Niemes	(Colombia) Ximena Rodríguez (Hungary) Virág Csurgó	4–6, 1–6
Loss	5.	11 October 1993	Santiago, Chile	Clay	(Chile) Bárbara Castro	(Argentina) Paola Suárez (Argentina) Pamela Zingman	1–6, 6–3, 0–6
Loss	6.	1 November 1993	Freeport, Bahamas	Hard	(Japan) Kiyoko Yazawa	(United Kingdom) Joanne Moore (Brazil) Christina Rozwadowski	w/o
Win	3.	15 November 1993	San Salvador, El Salvador	Hard	(United Kingdom) Joanne Moore	(Colombia) Carmiña Giraldo (Colombia) Ximena Rodríguez	6–3, 6–4
Win	4.	7 February 1994	Bogotá, Colombia	Clay	(Venezuela) María Virginia Francesa	(Colombia) Giana Gutiérrez (Colombia) Cecilia Hincapié	4–6, 7–6^{(6)}, 6–4
Win	5.	21 March 1994	Puerto Vallarta, Mexico	Clay	(Chile) Paula Cabezas	(Japan) Shizuka Tokiwa (Japan) Kiyoko Yazawa	6–1, 6–2
Win	6.	22 May 1994	Ratzeburg, Germany	Clay	(Paraguay) Magalí Benítez	(Moldova) Svetlana Komleva (Israel) Nelly Barkan	3–6, 7–5, 7–6^{(6)}
Loss	7.	29 August 1994	San Salvador, El Salvador	Hard	(Colombia) Ximena Rodríguez	(United States) Kellie Dorman-Tyrone (United States) Philippa Palmer	2–6, 4–6
Loss	8.	12 September 1994	Manizales, Colombia	Clay	(Argentina) María Fernanda Landa	(Argentina) Guadalupe Bugallo (Brazil) Vanessa Menga	6–2, 4–6, 5–7
Loss	9.	3 October 1994	Zacatecas, Mexico	Clay	(Mexico) Claudia Muciño	(Mexico) Xóchitl Escobedo (Mexico) Lucila Becerra	4–6, 4–6
Win	7.	28 August 1995	San Salvador, El Salvador	Clay	(Ecuador) María Cristina Campana	(Mexico) Cristina Cortes (Peru) Déborah Gaviria	4–6, 6–4, 6–3
Loss	10.	20 October 1996	Coatzacoalcos, Mexico	Hard	(Mexico) Claudia Muciño	(United States) Tracey Hiete (Canada) Renata Kolbovic	3–6, 3–6
Win	8.	27 October 1996	Puebla, Mexico	Hard	(Mexico) Claudia Muciño	(United States) Aurora Gima (Mexico) Ana Paola González	6–1, 6–3
