= Nuria Niemes =

Ecuadorian tennis player

Nuria Niemes Guzman
- Country (sports): Ecuador
- Born: 19 June 1972 (age 52); Guayaquil, Ecuador
- Prize money: $8,848

Singles
- Career record: 25–33
- Highest ranking: No. 560 (7 April 1997)

Doubles
- Career record: 42–36
- Career titles: 3 ITF
- Highest ranking: No. 368 (11 October 1993)

Team competitions
- Fed Cup: 18–22

Nuria Niemes (born 19 June 1972) is an Ecuadorian former professional tennis player.

From 1992 to 2001 she featured in a record total of 31 Fed Cup ties for Ecuador.She is Ecuador's most successful doubles player with 16 wins and had a further two wins in singles. She was ranked #2 in the world for doubles in her junior years. Towards the end of her playing career she also served as team captain.

== ITF Circuit finals ==
=== Doubles: 7 (3–4) ===
Result	No.	Date	Tournament	Surface	Partner	Opponents	Score
Loss	1.	16 October 1988	ITF Santiago, Chile	Clay	(Brazil) Rita Cruz Lima	(Argentina) Federica Haumüller (Argentina) Florencia Labat	2–6, 6–4, 0–6
Win	1.	9 September 1991	ITF Guayaquil, Ecuador	Clay	(Chile) Paula Cabezas	(Chile) Macarena Miranda (Ecuador) María Dolores Campana	6–1, 7–5
Win	2.	18 October 1992	ITF Santiago, Chile	Clay	(Chile) Paula Cabezas	(Sweden) Maria-Farnes Capistrano (Venezuela) Ninfa Marra	3–6, 6–4, 6–4
Loss	2.	20 September 1993	ITF Guayaquil, Ecuador	Clay	(Chile) Paula Cabezas	(Argentina) Veronica Stele (Argentina) Cintia Tortorella	2–6, 1–6
Loss	3.	27 September 1993	ITF Santo Domingo, Dominican Republic	Clay	(Ecuador) María Dolores Campana	(Colombia) Ximena Rodríguez (Hungary) Virág Csurgó	4–6, 1–6
Win	3.	26 August 1996	ITF San Salvador, El Salvador	Clay	(Mexico) Graciela Vélez	(United Kingdom) Joanne Moore (United States) Kristine Kurth	7–5, 1–6, 6–1
Loss	4.	10 November 1996	ITF Santo Domingo, Dominican Republic	Clay	(United States) Candice De La Torre	(United States) Meredith Geiger (United States) Paige Yaroshuk	3–6, 2–6
