= 2018 Silicon Valley Classic – Singles =

Singles
- 2018 Silicon Valley Classic

Final
- Champion: (Romania) Mihaela Buzărnescu
- Runner-up: (Greece) Maria Sakkari
- Score: 6–1, 6–0

Details
- Draw: 28
- Seeds: 8

Events
Singles	Doubles
- Silicon Valley Classic

Madison Keys was the defending champion, but withdrew due to a wrist injury.

Mihaela Buzărnescu won her first WTA Tour singles title, defeating Maria Sakkari in the final, 6–1, 6–0.

== Seeds ==
The top four seeds received a bye into the second round.

1. (Spain) Garbiñe Muguruza (withdrew)
2. (United States) Madison Keys (withdrew)
3. (United States) Venus Williams (quarterfinals)
4. (Belgium) Elise Mertens (semifinals)
5. (Romania) Mihaela Buzărnescu (champion)
6. (United States) Serena Williams (first round)
7. (China) Zhang Shuai (first round)
8. (Hungary) Tímea Babos (second round)

Note: Aryna Sabalenka, who would have been placed in the entry list on the initial entry cutoff date of June 18, 2018 and seeded 7th, entered late and played the qualifying tournament. But she was eliminated in qualifying matches.

== Draw ==
Key

- Q = Qualifier
- WC = Wild card
- LL = Lucky loser
- Alt = Alternate
- ITF = ITF entry
- PR = Protected ranking
- SR = Special ranking
- SE = Special exempt
- JE = Junior exempt
- JR = Junior Accelerator Programme entrant
- CO = College Accelerator Programme entrant
- NG = Next Gen Accelerator Program entrant
- w/o = Walkover
- r = Retired
- d = Defaulted

=== Finals ===
Semifinals
(United States) Danielle Collins	6	5	2
(Greece) Maria Sakkari	3	7	6
4	(Belgium) Elise Mertens	6	3	1
5	(Romania) Mihaela Buzărnescu	4	6	6

Final
(Greece) Maria Sakkari	1	0
5	(Romania) Mihaela Buzărnescu	6	6

=== Top half ===
First round
(Belarus) V Azarenka	6	6^{7}	7
(Ukraine) K Bondarenko	3	7^{9}	5
(United States) D Collins	7^{7}	6
Q	(United States) D Lao	6^{2}	3
(Belarus) V Lapko	7^{7}	6
7	(China) S Zhang	6^{2}	0
(United Kingdom) H Watson	6	3	6
WC	(United States) C Liu	4	6	4
(Greece) M Sakkari	6	6
(United States) C McHale	2	2
(France) K Mladenovic	4	2
8	(Hungary) T Babos	6	6

Second round
LL	(Russia) A Blinkova	1	0
(Belarus) V Azarenka	6	6
(United States) D Collins	6	3	6
(Belarus) V Lapko	1	6	1
3/WC	(United States) V Williams	6	4	6
(United Kingdom) H Watson	4	6	0
(Greece) M Sakkari	6	6
8	(Hungary) T Babos	0	1

Quarterfinals
(Belarus) V Azarenka	7^{7}	0^{r}
(United States) D Collins	6^{4}	3
3/WC	(United States) V Williams	4	6^{2}
(Greece) M Sakkari	6	7^{7}

Semifinals
(United States) D Collins	6	5	2
(Greece) M Sakkari	3	7	6

=== Bottom half ===
First round
6/PR	(United States) S Williams	1	0
(United Kingdom) J Konta	6	6
(United States) S Kenin	6	6
Q	(Paraguay) V Cepede Royg	4	4
WC	(United States) A Kratzer	6	4	7
(United States) A Riske	4	6	5
5	(Romania) M Buzărnescu	6	4	6
(United States) S Vickery	3	6	3
(China) Q Wang	2	5
Q	(United States) A Anisimova	6	7
(Australia) A Tomljanović	6	6
Q	(Spain) G García Pérez	4	1

Second round
(United Kingdom) J Konta	6	6
(United States) S Kenin	1	4
WC	(United States) A Kratzer	2	0
4	(Belgium) E Mertens	6	6
5	(Romania) M Buzărnescu	7	2	6
Q	(United States) A Anisimova	5	6	1
(Australia) A Tomljanović	6	3	6
LL	(Poland) M Fręch	4	6	3

Quarterfinals
(United Kingdom) J Konta	6^{4}	3
4	(Belgium) E Mertens	7^{7}	6
5	(Romania) M Buzărnescu	6	7
(Australia) A Tomljanović	1	5

Semifinals
4	(Belgium) E Mertens	6	3	1
5	(Romania) M Buzărnescu	4	6	6

== Qualifying ==
=== Seeds ===
1. (Belarus) Aryna Sabalenka (first round)
2. (Russia) Anna Blinkova (qualifying competition, lucky loser)
3. (United States) Nicole Gibbs (first round)
4. (Poland) Magdalena Fręch (qualifying competition, lucky loser)
5. (Paraguay) Verónica Cepede Royg (qualified)
6. (United States) Irina Falconi (qualifying competition)
7. (Spain) Georgina García Pérez (qualified)
8. (United States) Amanda Anisimova (qualified)

=== Qualifiers ===
1. (Spain) Georgina García Pérez
2. (United States) Amanda Anisimova
3. (United States) Danielle Lao
4. (Paraguay) Verónica Cepede Royg

=== Lucky losers ===
1. (Russia) Anna Blinkova
2. (Poland) Magdalena Fręch

=== Qualifying draw ===
==== First qualifier ====
First round
1	(Belarus) Aryna Sabalenka	6	5	4
(United States) Maria Sanchez	2	7	6
(Japan) Miyu Kato	4	2
7	(Spain) Georgina García Pérez	6	6

Qualifying competition
(United States) Maria Sanchez	6^{4}	6^{3}
7	(Spain) Georgina García Pérez	7^{7}	7^{7}

==== Second qualifier ====
First round
2	(Russia) Anna Blinkova	6	6
WC	(France) Sybille Gauvain	0	3
(Australia) Priscilla Hon	1	3
8	(United States) Amanda Anisimova	6	6

Qualifying competition
2	(Russia) Anna Blinkova	7	3	6^{5}
8	(United States) Amanda Anisimova	5	6	7^{7}

==== Third qualifier ====
First round
3	(United States) Nicole Gibbs	6	2	2
(United States) Danielle Lao	3	6	6
(United States) Jacqueline Cako	2	5
6	(United States) Irina Falconi	6	7

Qualifying competition
(United States) Danielle Lao	6	6
6	(United States) Irina Falconi	1	3

==== Fourth qualifier ====
First round
4	(Poland) Magdalena Fręch	6	3	6
WC	(Colombia) Emiliana Arango	3	6	1
(Russia) Valeria Savinykh	3	6	4
5	(Paraguay) Verónica Cepede Royg	6	4	6

Qualifying competition
4	(Poland) Magdalena Fręch	4	6	4
5	(Paraguay) Verónica Cepede Royg	6	4	6
