= 2017 Bank of the West Classic – Doubles =

Doubles
- 2017 Bank of the West Classic

Final
- Champion: (United States) Abigail Spears (United States) Coco Vandeweghe
- Runner-up: (France) Alizé Cornet (Poland) Alicja Rosolska
- Score: 6–2, 6–3

Details
- Draw: 16
- Seeds: 4

Events
Singles	Doubles
← 2016 ·	Bank of the West Classic	· 2018 →

Raquel Atawo and Abigail Spears were the defending champions, but chose not to compete together. Atawo played alongside Chan Hao-ching, but lost in the first round to Jennifer Brady and Madison Keys. Spears teamed up with Coco Vandeweghe and successfully defended her title, defeating Alizé Cornet and Alicja Rosolska in the final, 6–2, 6–3.

== Seeds ==
1. (United States) Raquel Atawo / (Chinese Taipei) Chan Hao-ching (first round)
2. (Canada) Gabriela Dabrowski / (China) Xu Yifan (first round)
3. (United States) Abigail Spears / (United States) Coco Vandeweghe (champions)
4. (Chinese Taipei) Chuang Chia-jung / (Japan) Miyu Kato (first round)

== Draw ==
=== Key ===
- Q = Qualifier
- WC = Wild card
- LL = Lucky loser
- Alt = Alternate
- SE = Special exempt
- PR = Protected ranking
- ITF = ITF entry
- JE = Junior exempt
- w/o = Walkover
- r = Retired
- d = Defaulted
- SR = Special ranking

First round
1	(United States) R Atawo (Chinese Taipei) H-c Chan	6	5	[6]
(United States) J Brady (United States) M Keys	4	7	[10]
(Ukraine) K Bondarenko (Australia) Ar Rodionova	6	1	[10]
(France) A Cornet (Poland) A Rosolska	2	6	[12]
4	(Chinese Taipei) C-j Chuang (Japan) M Kato	5	3
(United States) K Day (United States) C Dolehide	7	6
(Serbia) J Jakšić (Russia) N Vikhlyantseva	1	2
(United States) J Cako (Germany) N Geuer	6	6
(New Zealand) M Erakovic (Croatia) A Tomljanović
(United States) K Ahn (United States) N Gibbs	w/o
(Czech Republic) E Hrdinová (United States) A Muhammad	3	0
3	(United States) A Spears (United States) C Vandeweghe	6	6
(Russia) A Pavlyuchenkova (Ukraine) O Savchuk	6	2	[10]
WC	(United States) M Lord (Canada) C Zhao	3	6	[6]
(Ukraine) L Kichenok (Ukraine) N Kichenok	6	6
2	(Canada) G Dabrowski (China) Y Xu	4	4

Quarterfinals
(United States) J Brady (United States) M Keys	1^{r}
(France) A Cornet (Poland) A Rosolska	4
(United States) K Day (United States) C Dolehide	3	6	[10]
(United States) J Cako (Germany) N Geuer	6	3	[8]
(United States) K Ahn (United States) N Gibbs	7^{9}	4	[6]
3	(United States) A Spears (United States) C Vandeweghe	6^{7}	6	[10]
(Russia) A Pavlyuchenkova (Ukraine) O Savchuk	6	6
(Ukraine) L Kichenok (Ukraine) N Kichenok	3	3

Semifinals
(France) A Cornet (Poland) A Rosolska	5	6	[11]
(United States) K Day (United States) C Dolehide	7	4	[9]
3	(United States) A Spears (United States) C Vandeweghe	6	6
(Russia) A Pavlyuchenkova (Ukraine) O Savchuk	3	2

Final
(France) A Cornet (Poland) A Rosolska	2	3
3	(United States) A Spears (United States) C Vandeweghe	6	6
