= 2018 Silicon Valley Classic =

- Date: 30 July – 5 August
- Edition: 47th
- Category: WTA Premier
- Draw: 28S / 16D
- Prize money: $753,000
- Surface: Hard
- Location: San Jose, California, United States
- Venue: San José State University Tennis Center

Champions

Singles
- (Romania) Mihaela Buzărnescu

Doubles
- (Chinese Taipei) Latisha Chan / (Czech Republic) Květa Peschke
← 2017 ·	Silicon Valley Classic	· 2019 →

The 2018 Silicon Valley Classic (also known as the Mubadala Silicon Valley Classic for sponsorship reasons) was a professional women's tennis tournament played on hard courts. It was the 47th edition of the tournament, and part of the WTA Premier tournaments of the 2018 WTA Tour. It took place between 30 July and 5 August 2018 and was the first time the tournament is held in San Jose, California, following a move from Stanford. It was the first women's event on the 2018 US Open Series.

== Points and prize money ==
=== Point distribution ===
Event	W	F	SF	QF	Round of 16	Round of 32	Q	Q2	Q1
Women's singles	470	305	185	100	55	1	25	13	1
Women's doubles	470	305	185	100	1	—	—	—	—

=== Prize money ===
Event	W	F	SF	QF	Round of 16	Round of 32	Q2	Q1
Women's singles	$128,100	$68,280	$37,330	$21,330	$10,670	$6,990	$3,225	$1,810
Women's doubles	$40,300	$21,330	$11,735	$5,975	$3,240	—	—	—

== Singles main-draw entrants ==
=== Seeds ===
Country	Player	Rank^{1}	Seed
~~ESP~~	~~Garbiñe Muguruza~~	~~7~~	~~1~~
~~USA~~	~~Madison Keys~~	~~12~~	~~2~~
USA	Venus Williams	14	3
BEL	Elise Mertens	15	4
ROU	Mihaela Buzărnescu	24	5
USA	Serena Williams	27	6
CHN	Zhang Shuai	32	7
HUN	Tímea Babos	39	8

- ^{1} Rankings are as of July 23, 2018.

=== Other entrants ===
The following players received wildcards into the singles main draw:

- (United States) Ashley Kratzer
- (United States) Claire Liu
- ~~(Spain) Garbiñe Muguruza~~
- (United States) Venus Williams

The following player received entry using a protected ranking:

- (United States) Serena Williams

The following players received entry from the qualifying draw:

- (United States) Amanda Anisimova
- (Paraguay) Verónica Cepede Royg
- (Spain) Georgina García Pérez
- (United States) Danielle Lao

The following players received entry as lucky losers:

- (Russia) Anna Blinkova
- (Poland) Magdalena Fręch

=== Withdrawals ===
- (United States) Catherine Bellis → replaced by (Ukraine) Kateryna Bondarenko
- (Slovenia) Polona Hercog → replaced by (United States) Sofia Kenin
- (United States) Madison Keys → replaced by (Poland) Magdalena Fręch
- (Spain) Garbiñe Muguruza → replaced by (Russia) Anna Blinkova
- (Russia) Anastasia Pavlyuchenkova → replaced by (United Kingdom) Heather Watson
- (Russia) Maria Sharapova → replaced by (Belarus) Victoria Azarenka
- (United States) CoCo Vandeweghe → replaced by (United States) Christina McHale

=== Retirements ===
- (Belarus) Victoria Azarenka

== Doubles main-draw entrants ==
=== Seeds ===
Country	Player	Country	Player	Rank^{1}	Seed
TPE	Latisha Chan	CZE	Květa Peschke	17	1
ROU	Mihaela Buzărnescu	GBR	Heather Watson	80	2
UKR	Lyudmyla Kichenok	UKR	Nadiia Kichenok	84	3
JPN	Miyu Kato	JPN	Makoto Ninomiya	92	4

- ^{1} Rankings are as of July 23, 2018.

=== Other entrants ===
The following pair received a wildcard into the main draw:

- (United States) Tamara Culibrk / (France) Sybille Gauvain

=== Withdrawals ===
During the tournament

- (Belarus) Aryna Sabalenka

== Finals ==
=== Singles ===
- (Romania) Mihaela Buzărnescu defeated (Greece) Maria Sakkari, 6–1, 6–0

=== Doubles ===
- (Chinese Taipei) Latisha Chan / (Czech Republic) Květa Peschke defeated (Ukraine) Lyudmyla Kichenok / (Ukraine) Nadiia Kichenok, 6–4, 6–1
