= 2021 Silicon Valley Classic =

- Date: 2–8 August
- Edition: 49th
- Category: WTA 500
- Draw: 32S / 16D
- Prize money: $565,530
- Surface: Hard / outdoor
- Location: San Jose, California, United States
- Venue: San José State University Tennis Center

Champions

Singles
- (United States) Danielle Collins

Doubles
- (Croatia) Darija Jurak / (Slovenia) Andreja Klepač
- Silicon Valley Classic

The 2021 Silicon Valley Classic (also known as the Mubadala Silicon Valley Classic for sponsorship reasons) was a professional tennis tournament played on hard courts. It was the 49th edition of the tournament, and part of the WTA 500 of the 2021 WTA Tour. It took place between 2 and 8 August 2021 in San Jose, California. It was the first women's event on the 2021 US Open Series.

== Champions ==
=== Singles ===
- (United States) Danielle Collins def. (Russia) Daria Kasatkina, 6–3, 6–7^{(10–12)}, 6–1

=== Doubles ===
- (Croatia) Darija Jurak / (Slovenia) Andreja Klepač def. (Canada) Gabriela Dabrowski / (Brazil) Luisa Stefani, 6−1, 7−5

== Points and prize money ==
=== Point distribution ===
Event	W	F	SF	QF	Round of 16	Round of 32	Q	Q2	Q1
Women's singles	470	305	185	100	55	1	25	13	1
Women's doubles	470	305	185	100	1	—N/a	—N/a	—N/a	—N/a

=== Prize money ===
Event	W	F	SF	QF	Round of 16	Round of 32	Q2	Q1
Women's singles	$68,570	$51,000	$32,400	$15,500	$8,200	$7,200	$6,145	$3,700
Women's doubles	$25,230	$17,750	$10,000	$5,500	$3,500	—N/a	—N/a	—N/a

== Singles main-draw entrants ==
=== Seeds ===
Country	Player	Rank^{1}	Seed
BEL	Elise Mertens	17	1
KAZ	Elena Rybakina	20	2
USA	Madison Keys	26	3
RUS	Daria Kasatkina	31	4
~~RUS~~	~~Veronika Kudermetova~~	~~32~~	~~5~~
CRO	Petra Martić	33	6
USA	Danielle Collins	35	7
KAZ	Yulia Putintseva	36	8
USA	Alison Riske	37	9

- Rankings are as of July 26, 2021.

=== Other entrants ===
The following players received wildcards into the main draw:

- (United States) Claire Liu
- (United Kingdom) Emma Raducanu

The following player received entry using a protected ranking:

- (United States) CoCo Vandeweghe

The following players received entry from the qualifying draw:

- (United States) Emina Bektas
- (South Korea) Han Na-lae
- (Croatia) Ana Konjuh
- (Netherlands) Lesley Pattinama Kerkhove

=== Withdrawals ===
Before the tournament

- (Russia) Ekaterina Alexandrova → replaced by (France) Kristina Mladenovic
- (Spain) Paula Badosa → replaced by (France) Caroline Garcia
- (United States) Sofia Kenin → replaced by (Czech Republic) Marie Bouzková
- (Russia) Veronika Kudermetova → replaced by (United States) Caty McNally
- (Czech Republic) Karolína Muchová → replaced by (Croatia) Donna Vekić
- (Latvia) Jeļena Ostapenko → replaced by (Latvia) Anastasija Sevastova

== Doubles main-draw entrants ==
=== Seeds ===
Country	Player	Country	Player	Rank^{1}	Seed
CAN	Gabriela Dabrowski	BRA	Luisa Stefani	37	1
CRO	Darija Jurak	SLO	Andreja Klepač	49	2
AUS	Ellen Perez	CZE	Květa Peschke	76	3
~~CZE~~	~~Marie Bouzková~~	~~CZE~~	~~Lucie Hradecká~~	~~78~~	~~4~~
MEX	Giuliana Olmos	USA	Sabrina Santamaria	90	5

- ^{1} Rankings are as of 26 July 2021.

=== Other entrants ===
The following pairs received wildcards into the doubles main draw:

- (United States) Makenna Jones / (United States) Elizabeth Scotty
- (United States) Ashlyn Krueger / (United States) Robin Montgomery

The following pair received entry as a alternates:

- (United States) Peyton Stearns / (United States) Maribella Zamarripa

=== Withdrawals ===
Before the tournament

- (Czech Republic) Marie Bouzková / (Czech Republic) Lucie Hradecká → replaced by (United States) Peyton Stearns / (United States) Maribella Zamarripa
- (Chinese Taipei) Chan Hao-ching / (Chinese Taipei) Latisha Chan → replaced by (France) Elixane Lechemia / (United States) Ingrid Neel
- (United States) Desirae Krawczyk / (United States) Bethanie Mattek-Sands → replaced by (United States) Emina Bektas / (United Kingdom) Tara Moore
- (India) Sania Mirza / (United States) Asia Muhammad → replaced by (New Zealand) Erin Routliffe / (Indonesia) Aldila Sutjiadi
