= 2018 Silicon Valley Classic – Doubles =

Doubles
- 2018 Silicon Valley Classic

Final
- Champions: (Chinese Taipei) Latisha Chan (Czech Republic) Květa Peschke
- Runners-up: (Ukraine) Lyudmyla Kichenok (Ukraine) Nadiia Kichenok
- Score: 6–4, 6–1

Details
- Draw: 15
- Seeds: 4

Events
Singles	Doubles
← 2017 ·	Silicon Valley Classic	· 2019 →

Abigail Spears and CoCo Vandeweghe were the defending champions, but chose not to participate this year.

Latisha Chan and Květa Peschke won the title, defeating Lyudmyla and Nadiia Kichenok in the final, 6–4, 6–1.

== Seeds ==
1. (Chinese Taipei) Latisha Chan / (Czech Republic) Květa Peschke (champions)
2. (Romania) Mihaela Buzărnescu / (United Kingdom) Heather Watson (semifinals)
3. (Ukraine) Lyudmyla Kichenok / (Ukraine) Nadiia Kichenok (final)
4. (Japan) Miyu Kato / (Japan) Makoto Ninomiya (semifinals)

== Draw ==
=== Key ===
- Q = Qualifier
- WC = Wild card
- LL = Lucky loser
- Alt = Alternate
- SE = Special exempt
- PR = Protected ranking
- ITF = ITF entry
- JE = Junior exempt
- w/o = Walkover
- r = Retired
- d = Defaulted
- SR = Special ranking

=== Draw ===
First round
(Paraguay) V Cepede Royg (United States) I Falconi	4	1
(United States) S Kenin (Belarus) A Sabalenka	6	6
4	(Japan) M Kato (Japan) M Ninomiya	1	7	[10]
(Poland) M Fręch (United States) M Sanchez	6	5	[4]
(Ukraine) K Bondarenko (Russia) V Savinykh	4	4
(Spain) G García Pérez (Australia) P Hon	6	6
(Argentina) M Irigoyen (United States) D Krawczyk	3	3
(Russia) A Blinkova (Russia) N Dzalamidze	6	6
(United States) K Christian (United States) S Santamaria	6	3	[7]
3	(Ukraine) L Kichenok (Ukraine) N Kichenok	4	6	[10]
(United States) J Cako (Germany) N Geuer	3	2
(United Kingdom) J Konta (China) S Zhang	6	6
WC	(United States) T Culibrk (France) S Gauvain	3	3
2	(Romania) M Buzărnescu (United Kingdom) H Watson	6	6

Quarterfinals
1	(Chinese Taipei) L Chan (Czech Republic) K Peschke	w/o
(United States) S Kenin (Belarus) A Sabalenka
4	(Japan) M Kato (Japan) M Ninomiya	6	6
(Spain) G García Pérez (Australia) P Hon	4	2
(Russia) A Blinkova (Russia) N Dzalamidze	6	2	[6]
3	(Ukraine) L Kichenok (Ukraine) N Kichenok	1	6	[10]
(United Kingdom) J Konta (China) S Zhang	5	2
2	(Romania) M Buzărnescu (United Kingdom) H Watson	7	6

Semifinals
1	(Chinese Taipei) L Chan (Czech Republic) K Peschke	6	6
4	(Japan) M Kato (Japan) M Ninomiya	1	4
3	(Ukraine) L Kichenok (Ukraine) N Kichenok	6	3	[10]
2	(Romania) M Buzărnescu (United Kingdom) H Watson	4	6	[8]

Final
1	(Chinese Taipei) L Chan (Czech Republic) K Peschke	6	6
3	(Ukraine) L Kichenok (Ukraine) N Kichenok	4	1
