= 2021 Silicon Valley Classic – Singles =

Singles
- 2021 Silicon Valley Classic

Final
- Champion: (United States) Danielle Collins
- Runner-up: (Russia) Daria Kasatkina
- Score: 6–3, 6–7^{(10–12)}, 6–1

Details
- Draw: 28
- Seeds: 8

Events
Singles	Doubles
← 2019 ·	Silicon Valley Classic	· 2022 →

Zheng Saisai was the reigning champion but chose not to participate.

Danielle Collins won the title, her second consecutive singles title on the WTA Tour, defeating Daria Kasatkina in the final, 6–3, 6–7^{(10–12)}, 6–1.

== Seeds ==
1. (Belgium) Elise Mertens (semifinals)
2. (Kazakhstan) Elena Rybakina (quarterfinals)
3. (United States) Madison Keys (second round)
4. (Russia) Daria Kasatkina (final)
5. (Russia) Veronika Kudermetova (withdrew)
6. (Croatia) Petra Martić (second round)
7. (United States) Danielle Collins (champion)
8. (Kazakhstan) Yulia Putintseva (quarterfinals)
9. (United States) Alison Riske (second round)

== Draw ==
=== Key ===
- Q = Qualifier
- WC = Wild card
- LL = Lucky loser
- Alt = Alternate
- SE = Special exempt
- PR = Protected ranking
- ITF = ITF entry
- JE = Junior exempt
- w/o = Walkover
- r = Retired
- d = Defaulted
- SR = Special ranking

=== Finals ===
Semifinals
1	(Belgium) Elise Mertens	3	2
4	(Russia) Daria Kasatkina	6	6
Q	(Croatia) Ana Konjuh	0	2
7	(United States) Danielle Collins	6	6

Final
4	(Russia) Daria Kasatkina	3	7^{12}	1
7	(United States) Danielle Collins	6	6^{10}	6

=== Top half ===
First round
(France) K Mladenovic	6	6
Q	(South Korea) N-l Han	4	4
(Australia) A Tomljanović	1	7	7
(United States) A Anisimova	6	5	5
(Croatia) D Vekić	5	3
8	(Kazakhstan) Y Putintseva	7	6
Q	(United States) E Bektas	3	4
(France) C Garcia	6	6
(Poland) M Linette	6	6
Q	(Netherlands) L Pattinama Kerkhove	3	3
(Latvia) A Sevastova	3	3
6	(Croatia) P Martić	6	6

Second round
1	(Belgium) E Mertens	6	4	6
(France) K Mladenovic	2	6	4
(Australia) A Tomljanović	6	5	3
8	(Kazakhstan) Y Putintseva	3	7	6
4	(Russia) D Kasatkina	3	7	6
(France) C Garcia	6	5	3
(Poland) M Linette	7	7^{7}
6	(Croatia) P Martić	5	6^{5}

Quarterfinals
1	(Belgium) E Mertens	6	7^{10}
8	(Kazakhstan) Y Putintseva	3	6^{8}
4	(Russia) D Kasatkina	6	3	6
(Poland) M Linette	4	6	4

Semifinals
1	(Belgium) E Mertens	3	2
4	(Russia) D Kasatkina	6	6

=== Bottom half ===
First round
9	(United States) A Riske	6	6
PR	(United States) C Vandeweghe	3	4
(Czech Republic) M Bouzková	5	6	5
Q	(Croatia) A Konjuh	7	3	7
WC	(United Kingdom) E Raducanu	3	2
(China) S Zhang	6	6
7	(United States) D Collins	6	6
(United States) S Rogers	4	3
(United States) C McNally	4	2
(United States) S Stephens	6	6
(Ukraine) D Yastremska	3	6	4
WC	(United States) C Liu	6	4	6

Second round
9	(United States) A Riske	1	4
Q	(Croatia) A Konjuh	6	6
(China) S Zhang	7	7^{7}
3	(United States) M Keys	5	6^{5}
7	(United States) D Collins	3	6	6
(United States) S Stephens	6	4	3
WC	(United States) C Liu	6	0	2
2	(Kazakhstan) E Rybakina	2	6	6

Quarterfinals
Q	(Croatia) A Konjuh	3	6	6
(China) S Zhang	6	2	0
7	(United States) D Collins	7^{7}	7^{7}
2	(Kazakhstan) E Rybakina	6^{5}	6^{4}

Semifinals
Q	(Croatia) A Konjuh	0	2
7	(United States) D Collins	6	6

== Qualifying ==
=== Seeds ===
1. (Russia) Anastasia Potapova (qualifying competition)
2. (United States) Kristie Ahn (first round)
3. (United States) Caty McNally (moved to main draw)
4. (Croatia) Ana Konjuh (qualified)
5. (Australia) Arina Rodionova (first round)
6. (Netherlands) Lesley Pattinama Kerkhove (qualified)
7. (Russia) Valeria Savinykh (first round)
8. (Japan) Mayo Hibi (first round)

=== Qualifiers ===
1. (Netherlands) Lesley Pattinama Kerkhove
2. (South Korea) Han Na-lae
3. (United States) Emina Bektas
4. (Croatia) Ana Konjuh

=== Qualifying draw ===
==== First qualifier ====
First round
1	(Russia) Anastasia Potapova	2	6	6
(United States) Danielle Lao	6	0	2
(Canada) Carol Zhao	2	2
6	(Netherlands) Lesley Pattinama Kerkhove	6	6

Qualifying competition
1	(Russia) Anastasia Potapova	7^{7}	5	5
6	(Netherlands) Lesley Pattinama Kerkhove	6^{4}	7	7

==== Second qualifier ====
First round
2	(United States) Kristie Ahn	3	6	0
(South Korea) Han Na-lae	6	2	6
WC	(United States) Ashlyn Krueger	6	7^{7}
7	(Russia) Valeria Savinykh	1	6^{2}

Qualifying competition
(South Korea) Han Na-lae	6	4	6
WC	(United States) Ashlyn Krueger	1	6	1

==== Third qualifier ====
First round
Alt	(United States) Emina Bektas	6	1	6
(United States) Katie Volynets	4	6	3
(Australia) Ellen Perez	6	6^{2}	7
8	(Japan) Mayo Hibi	2	7^{7}	5

Qualifying competition
Alt	(United States) Emina Bektas	6	5	6
(Australia) Ellen Perez	4	7	4

==== Fourth qualifier ====
First round
4	(Croatia) Ana Konjuh	6	6
(Japan) Eri Hozumi	3	2
WC	(United States) Robin Montgomery	6	6
5	(Australia) Arina Rodionova	4	0

Qualifying competition
4	(Croatia) Ana Konjuh	6	7^{7}
WC	(United States) Robin Montgomery	3	6^{2}
