= 2017 Bank of the West Classic – Singles =

Singles
- 2017 Bank of the West Classic
- Final date: August 6, 2017

Final
- Champion: (United States) Madison Keys
- Runner-up: (United States) CoCo Vandeweghe
- Score: 7–6^{(7–4)}, 6–4

Details
- Draw: 28
- Seeds: 8

Events
Singles	Doubles
- Bank of the West Classic

The singles final of the Stanford Classic was held on August 6, 2017. Johanna Konta was the defending champion, but chose not to participate this year. Madison Keys won the title, defeating CoCo Vandeweghe in the final, 7–6^{(7–4)}, 6–4.

== Seeds ==
The top four seeds received a bye into the second round.

1. (Spain) Garbiñe Muguruza (semifinals)
2. (Czech Republic) Petra Kvitová (quarterfinals)
3. (United States) Madison Keys (champion)
4. (Russia) Anastasia Pavlyuchenkova (quarterfinals)
5. (Croatia) Ana Konjuh (quarterfinals)
6. (United States) CoCo Vandeweghe (final)
7. (Ukraine) Lesia Tsurenko (quarterfinals)
8. (United States) Catherine Bellis (semifinals)

== Draw ==
Key

- Q = Qualifier
- WC = Wild card
- LL = Lucky loser
- Alt = Alternate
- ITF = ITF entry
- PR = Protected ranking
- SR = Special ranking
- SE = Special exempt
- JE = Junior exempt
- JR = Junior Accelerator Programme entrant
- CO = College Accelerator Programme entrant
- NG = Next Gen Accelerator Program entrant
- w/o = Walkover
- r = Retired
- d = Defaulted

=== Finals ===
Semifinals
1	(Spain) Garbiñe Muguruza	3	2
3	(United States) Madison Keys	6	6
6	(United States) CoCo Vandeweghe	6	6
8	(United States) Catherine Bellis	3	1

Final
3	(United States) Madison Keys	7^{7}	6
6	(United States) CoCo Vandeweghe	6^{4}	4

=== Top half ===
First round
(Japan) M Doi	4	2
(United States) K Day	6	6
(Russia) N Vikhlyantseva	6	6
Q	(United States) D Lao	4	3
Q	(New Zealand) M Erakovic	3	0^{r}
5	(Croatia) A Konjuh	6	1
Q	(United States) C Dolehide	6	6
(Japan) N Osaka	4	2
WC	(Russia) M Sharapova	6	4	6
(United States) J Brady	1	6	0
(Spain) L Arruabarrena	3	3
7	(Ukraine) L Tsurenko	6	6

Second round
1	(Spain) G Muguruza	6	6
(United States) K Day	2	0
(Russia) N Vikhlyantseva	5	4
5	(Croatia) A Konjuh	7	6
3	(United States) M Keys	3	6	6
Q	(United States) C Dolehide	6	2	3
WC	(Russia) M Sharapova
7	(Ukraine) L Tsurenko	w/o

Quarterfinals
1	(Spain) G Muguruza	6	6
5	(Croatia) A Konjuh	1	3
3	(United States) M Keys	6	6
7	(Ukraine) L Tsurenko	4	3

Semifinals
1	(Spain) G Muguruza	3	2
3	(United States) M Keys	6	6

=== Bottom half ===
First round
6	(United States) C Vandeweghe	6	0
PR	(Croatia) A Tomljanović	2	0^{r}
(United States) N Gibbs	4	6	7^{7}
WC	(United States) C Liu	6	2	6^{5}
(United States) A Riske	6	6
(Poland) M Linette	2	4
8	(United States) C Bellis	6	6
(France) A Cornet	3	2
Q	(Paraguay) V Cepede Royg	2	7	6
(United States) K Ahn	6	5	1
(Italy) F Schiavone	3	4
(Ukraine) K Bondarenko	6	6

Second round
6	(United States) C Vandeweghe	6	6
(United States) N Gibbs	0	2
(United States) A Riske	4	0
4	(Russia) A Pavlyuchenkova	6	6
8	(United States) C Bellis	7^{7}	6
Q	(Paraguay) V Cepede Royg	6^{3}	2
(Ukraine) K Bondarenko	2	2
2/WC	(Czech Republic) P Kvitová	6	6

Quarterfinals
6	(United States) C Vandeweghe	6	6
4	(Russia) A Pavlyuchenkova	2	3
8	(United States) C Bellis	6	6
2/WC	(Czech Republic) P Kvitová	2	0

Semifinals
6	(United States) C Vandeweghe	6	6
8	(United States) C Bellis	3	1

== Qualifying ==
=== Seeds ===
1. (Paraguay) Verónica Cepede Royg (qualified)
2. (Australia) Arina Rodionova (withdrew, still competing in Nanchang)
3. (United States) Asia Muhammad (qualifying competition)
4. (Australia) Lizette Cabrera (qualifying competition)
5. (Japan) Miyu Kato (first round)
6. (United States) Sachia Vickery (qualifying competition)
7. (New Zealand) Marina Erakovic (qualified)
8. (United States) Caroline Dolehide (qualified)
9. (United States) Jacqueline Cako (first round)

=== Qualifiers ===
1. (Paraguay) Verónica Cepede Royg
2. (New Zealand) Marina Erakovic
3. (United States) Danielle Lao
4. (United States) Caroline Dolehide

=== Draw ===
==== First qualifier ====
First round
1	(Paraguay) Verónica Cepede Royg	6	6
(Chinese Taipei) Chan Hao-ching	3	2
(Hungary) Fanny Stollár	4	1
6	(United States) Sachia Vickery	6	6

Qualifying competition
1	(Paraguay) Verónica Cepede Royg	6	4	7
6	(United States) Sachia Vickery	3	6	5

==== Second qualifier ====
First round
9	(United States) Jacqueline Cako	5	6	4
WC	(United States) Michaela Gordon	7	2	6
Alt	(United States) Raquel Atawo	4	0
7	(New Zealand) Marina Erakovic	6	6

Qualifying competition
WC	(United States) Michaela Gordon	6	3	6^{5}
7	(New Zealand) Marina Erakovic	3	6	7^{7}

==== Third qualifier ====
First round
3	(United States) Asia Muhammad	6	6
WC	(United States) Emma Higuchi	3	1
(United States) Danielle Lao	6	6
5	(Japan) Miyu Kato	1	2

Qualifying competition
3	(United States) Asia Muhammad	5	3
(United States) Danielle Lao	7	6

==== Fourth qualifier ====
First round
4	(Australia) Lizette Cabrera	6	6
(United States) Abigail Spears	3	2
(Canada) Gabriela Dabrowski	1	2
8	(United States) Caroline Dolehide	6	6

Qualifying competition
4	(Australia) Lizette Cabrera	6	3	4
8	(United States) Caroline Dolehide	4	6	6
