= 2017 Bank of the West Classic =

- Date: 31 July – 6 August
- Edition: 46th
- Category: WTA Premier
- Draw: 28S / 16D
- Prize money: $753,000
- Surface: Hard
- Location: Stanford, California, United States

Champions

Singles
- (United States) Madison Keys

Doubles
- (United States) Abigail Spears / (United States) CoCo Vandeweghe
- Stanford Classic

The 2017 Stanford Classic (sponsored by Bank of the West) was a professional tennis tournament played on hard courts. It was the 46th edition of the tournament, and part of the WTA Premier tournaments of the 2017 WTA Tour. It took place in Stanford, California, United States between 31 July and 6 August 2017. It was the first women's event on the 2017 US Open Series. This event saw the top eight seeds make it to the quarterfinals, the first time since 2004 that this had happened at a WTA tournament.

== Points and prize money ==
=== Point distribution ===
Event	W	F	SF	QF	Round of 16	Round of 32	Q	Q2	Q1
Women's singles	470	305	185	100	55	1	25	13	1
Women's doubles	470	305	185	100	1	—N/a	—N/a	—N/a	—N/a

=== Prize money ===
Event	W	F	SF	QF	Round of 16	Round of 32	Q2	Q1
Women's singles	$128,100	$68,280	$37,330	$21,330	$10,670	$6,990	$3,225	$1,810
Women's doubles	$40,300	$21,330	$11,735	$5,975	$3,240	—N/a	—N/a	—N/a

== Singles main-draw entrants ==
=== Seeds ===
Country	Player	Rank^{1}	Seed
ESP	Garbiñe Muguruza	4	1
CZE	Petra Kvitová	14	2
USA	Madison Keys	16	3
RUS	Anastasia Pavlyuchenkova	18	4
CRO	Ana Konjuh	21	5
USA	CoCo Vandeweghe	23	6
UKR	Lesia Tsurenko	31	7
USA	Catherine Bellis	43	8

- ^{1} Rankings are as of July 24, 2017.

=== Other entrants ===
The following players received wildcards into the singles main draw:

- (Czech Republic) Petra Kvitová
- (United States) Claire Liu
- (Russia) Maria Sharapova

The following player received entry using a protected ranking:

- (Croatia) Ajla Tomljanović

The following players received entry from the qualifying draw:

- (Paraguay) Verónica Cepede Royg
- (United States) Caroline Dolehide
- (New Zealand) Marina Erakovic
- (United States) Danielle Lao

=== Withdrawals ===
Before the tournament

- (Hungary) Tímea Babos →replaced by (United States) Jennifer Brady
- (United States) Varvara Lepchenko →replaced by (Ukraine) Kateryna Bondarenko
- (Czech Republic) Kristýna Plíšková →replaced by (Croatia) Ajla Tomljanović
- (Czech Republic) Kateřina Siniaková →replaced by (United States) Kayla Day
- (China) Wang Qiang →replaced by (United States) Kristie Ahn

During the tournament

- (Russia) Maria Sharapova

== Doubles main-draw entrants ==
=== Seeds ===
Country	Player	Country	Player	Rank^{1}	Seed
USA	Raquel Atawo	TPE	Chan Hao-ching	39	1
CAN	Gabriela Dabrowski	CHN	Xu Yifan	45	2
USA	Abigail Spears	USA	CoCo Vandeweghe	62	3
TPE	Chuang Chia-jung	JPN	Miyu Kato	100	4

- ^{1} Rankings are as of July 24, 2017.

=== Other entrants ===
The following pair received a wildcard into the main draw:

- (United States) Melissa Lord / (Canada) Carol Zhao

=== Withdrawals ===
- (New Zealand) Marina Erakovic / (Croatia) Ajla Tomljanović

== Finals ==
=== Singles ===
- (United States) Madison Keys def. (United States) CoCo Vandeweghe, 7–6^{(7–4)}, 6–4

=== Doubles ===
- (United States) Abigail Spears / (United States) CoCo Vandeweghe def. (France) Alizé Cornet / (Poland) Alicja Rosolska, 6–2, 6–3
