= 2021 Silicon Valley Classic – Doubles =

Doubles
- 2021 Silicon Valley Classic

Final
- Champions: (Croatia) Darija Jurak (Slovenia) Andreja Klepač
- Runners-up: (Canada) Gabriela Dabrowski (Brazil) Luisa Stefani
- Score: 6–1, 7–5

Events
Singles	Doubles
- Silicon Valley Classic

Nicole Melichar and Květa Peschke were the defending champions but Melichar chose not to participate. Peschke partnered alongside Ellen Perez but lost in the semifinals to Gabriela Dabrowski and Luisa Stefani.

Darija Jurak and Andreja Klepač won the title, defeating Dabrowski and Stefani in the final, 6–1, 7–5.

== Seeds ==
1. (Canada) Gabriela Dabrowski / (Brazil) Luisa Stefani (final)
2. (Croatia) Darija Jurak / (Slovenia) Andreja Klepač (champions)
3. (Australia) Ellen Perez / (Czech Republic) Květa Peschke (semifinals)
4. (Czech Republic) Marie Bouzková / (Czech Republic) Lucie Hradecká (withdrew)
5. (Mexico) Giuliana Olmos / (United States) Sabrina Santamaria (first round)

== Draw ==
Key

- Q = Qualifier
- WC = Wild card
- LL = Lucky loser
- Alt = Alternate
- ITF = ITF entry
- PR = Protected ranking
- SR = Special ranking
- SE = Special exempt
- JE = Junior exempt
- JR = Junior Accelerator Programme entrant
- CO = College Accelerator Programme entrant
- NG = Next Gen Accelerator Program entrant
- w/o = Walkover
- r = Retired
- d = Defaulted

=== Draw ===
First round
1	(Canada) G Dabrowski (Brazil) L Stefani	7	3	[12]
(United States) K Christian (Australia) Ar Rodionova	5	6	[10]
WC	(United States) A Krueger (United States) R Montgomery	6	6
(Netherlands) L Pattinama Kerkhove (Netherlands) R van der Hoek	3	2
3	(Australia) E Perez (Czech Republic) K Peschke	6	6
(France) E Lechemia (United States) I Neel	3	2
(Japan) E Hozumi (China) S Zhang	6	3	[10]
WC	(United States) M Jones (United States) E Scotty	1	6	[3]
(United States) C McNally (United States) C Vandeweghe	6	1	[10]
(New Zealand) E Routliffe (Indonesia) A Sutjiadi	4	6	[5]
(Russia) V Savinykh (Ukraine) D Yastremska	6	7
5	(Mexico) G Olmos (United States) S Santamaria	4	5
Alt	(United States) P Stearns (United States) M Zamarripa	4	6	[10]
(United States) E Bektas (United Kingdom) T Moore	6	1	[12]
(United States) A Anisimova (Russia) A Potapova	3	7	[8]
2	(Croatia) D Jurak (Slovenia) A Klepač	6	5	[10]

Quarterfinals
1	(Canada) G Dabrowski (Brazil) L Stefani	6	6
WC	(United States) A Krueger (United States) R Montgomery	4	2
3	(Australia) E Perez (Czech Republic) K Peschke	6	6
(Japan) E Hozumi (China) S Zhang	3	1
(United States) C McNally (United States) C Vandeweghe	6	6
(Russia) V Savinykh (Ukraine) D Yastremska	4	5^{r}
(United States) E Bektas (United Kingdom) T Moore	2	3
2	(Croatia) D Jurak (Slovenia) A Klepač	6	6

Semifinals
1	(Canada) G Dabrowski (Brazil) L Stefani	6	4	[10]
3	(Australia) E Perez (Czech Republic) K Peschke	3	6	[8]
(United States) C McNally (United States) C Vandeweghe	6^{2}	6^{6}
2	(Croatia) D Jurak (Slovenia) A Klepač	7^{7}	7^{8}

Final
1	(Canada) G Dabrowski (Brazil) L Stefani	1	5
2	(Croatia) D Jurak (Slovenia) A Klepač	6	7
