= Tamara Culibrk =

American tennis player

- Country (sports): United States
- Born: 29 November 1997 (age 27)
- College: San Jose State
- Prize money: $123

Singles
- Career record: 7–12
- Career titles: 0

Doubles
- Career record: 0–1
- Career titles: 0
- Last updated on: 30 July 2018.

Tamara Culibrk (born 29 November 1997) is an American tennis player.

Culibrk made her WTA main draw debut at the 2018 Silicon Valley Classic in the doubles draw partnering Sybille Gauvain.

Culibrk played college tennis at San Jose State University.
