= Melissa Lord =

American tennis player

- Country (sports): United States
- Born: June 24, 1997 (age 27); Hartford, United States
- Height: 1.70 m (5 ft 7 in)
- Plays: Right-handed (two-handed backhand)
- College: Stanford
- Prize money: $1,810

Singles
- Career record: 0–1
- Career titles: 0

Doubles
- Career record: 0–1
- Career titles: 0
- Last updated on: 1 August 2017.

Melissa Lord (born June 24, 1997) is an American tennis player.

Lord made her WTA main draw debut at the 2017 Bank of the West Classic in the doubles draw partnering Carol Zhao.

Lord plays college tennis at Stanford University.
