= Sybille Gauvain =

French tennis player

- Country (sports): France
- Born: 31 July 1994 (age 30)
- College: San Jose State
- Prize money: $2,830

Singles
- Career record: 9–12
- Career titles: 0
- Highest ranking: No. 980 (9 July 2012)

Doubles
- Career record: 0–4
- Career titles: 0
- Last updated on: 30 July 2018.

Sybille Gauvain (born 31 July 1994) is a French tennis player.

Gauvain made her WTA main draw debut at the 2018 Silicon Valley Classic in the doubles draw partnering Tamara Culibrk.

Gauvain has a career high WTA singles ranking of 980 achieved on 9 July 2012.

Gauvain played college tennis at San Jose State University.
