= Silicon Valley Classic =

Defunct tennis tournament
- Tour: ILTF World Circuit (1971–72); Virginia Slims Circuit (1973–87); WTA Tour (1988–2022)
- Founded: 1971; 55 years ago
- Editions: 50 (2022)
- Location: San Jose, California; United States
- Venue: San Jose State University
- Category: WTA Tier II (1990–2008); WTA Premier tournaments (2009–2019); WTA 500 (2021–2022)
- Surface: Hardcourt / outdoor
- Draw: 28S / 16SQ / 16D )2022)
- Prize money: US$ 757,900 (2022)
- Website: mubadalasvc.com

The Silicon Valley Classic was a tennis tournament on the WTA Tour held on the campus of San Jose State University in San Jose, California. Started in 1971, the tournament was the oldest women's-only tournament in the world and was played on outdoor hardcourts. It was the first women's tournament in the annual US Open Series.

The tournament started out as the British Motor Cars Invitation in 1971 on the Virginia Slims circuit. Prior to 1978, the tournament was known as the Virginia Slims of San Francisco. The tournament was sponsored by Bank of the West from 1992 to 2017 (branding it as the Bank of the West Classic), and held on the campus of Stanford University from 1997 to 2017, and run by Dick Gould. The event moved to San Jose State University in 2018 and received a new sponsor, Mubadala Investment Company, branding the tournament as the Mubadala Silicon Valley Classic.

Martina Navratilova won the tournament a record five times (1979–1980, 1988, 1991, and 1993).

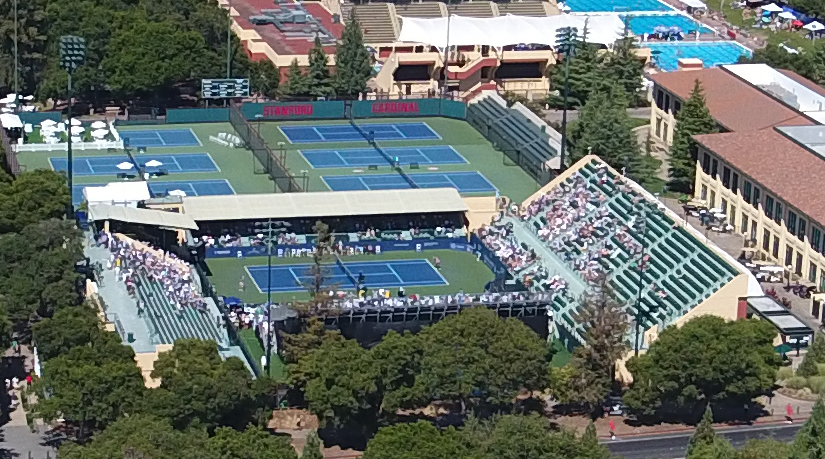
Bank of the West Classic Tennis Tournament 2015 Finals Match

On June 1, 2023, it was announced that the tournament would merge with the pre-existing Washington Open and move permanently to Washington, D.C. The Washington tournament thereby went from being a WTA 250 event to being a WTA 500 event. The Silicon Valley Classic thus held its final tournament in 2022.

== Past finals ==
=== Singles ===
Year	Champion	Runner-up	Score
1971	(United States) Billie Jean King	(United States) Rosemary Casals	6–3, 6–4
1972	(United States) Billie Jean King (2)	(Australia) Kerry Melville	7–6^{(5–0)}, 7–6^{(5–2)}
1973	(Australia) Margaret Court	(Australia) Kerry Melville	6–3, 6–3
1974	(United States) Billie Jean King (3)	(United States) Chris Evert	7–6^{(5–2)}, 6–2
1975	(United States) Chris Evert	(United States) Billie Jean King	6–1, 6–1
1976	(United States) Chris Evert (2)	(Australia) Evonne Goolagong Cawley	7–5, 7–6^{(5–2)}
1977	(United Kingdom) Sue Barker	(United Kingdom) Virginia Wade	6–3, 6–4
1978	Not held		
1979	(United States) Martina Navratilova	(United States) Chris Evert	7–5, 7–5
1980	(United States) Martina Navratilova (2)	(Australia) Evonne Goolagong Cawley	6–1, 7–6^{(7–4)}
1981	(United States) Andrea Jaeger	(United Kingdom) Virginia Wade	6–3, 6–1
1982	(United States) Andrea Jaeger (2)	(United States) Chris Evert	7–6^{(7–5)}, 6–4
1983	(West Germany) Bettina Bunge	(West Germany) Sylvia Hanika	6–3, 6–3
1984	(Czechoslovakia) Hana Mandlíková	(United States) Martina Navratilova	7–6^{(8–6)}, 3–6, 6–4
1985	(Czechoslovakia) Hana Mandlíková (2)	(United States) Chris Evert	6–2, 6–4
1986	(United States) Chris Evert (3)	(United States) Kathy Jordan	6–2, 6–4
1987	(United States) Zina Garrison	(West Germany) Sylvia Hanika	7–5, 4–6, 6–3
1988	(United States) Martina Navratilova (3)	(Soviet Union) Larisa Savchenko	6–1, 6–2
1989	(United States) Zina Garrison (2)	(Soviet Union) Larisa Savchenko	6–1, 6–1
↓ Tier II tournament ↓
1990	(Socialist Federal Republic of Yugoslavia) Monica Seles	(United States) Martina Navratilova	6–3, 7–6^{(7–5)}
1991	(United States) Martina Navratilova (4)	(Socialist Federal Republic of Yugoslavia) Monica Seles	6–3, 3–6, 6–3
1992	(Federal Republic of Yugoslavia) Monica Seles (2)	(United States) Martina Navratilova	6–3, 6–4
1993	(United States) Martina Navratilova (5)	(United States) Zina Garrison	6–2, 7–6^{(7–1)}
1994	(Spain) Arantxa Sánchez Vicario	(United States) Martina Navratilova	1–6, 7–6^{(7–5)}, 7–6^{(7–5)}
1995	(Bulgaria) Magdalena Maleeva	(Empire of Japan) Ai Sugiyama	6–3, 6–4
1996	(Switzerland) Martina Hingis	(United States) Monica Seles	6–2, 6–0
1997	(Switzerland) Martina Hingis (2)	(Spain) Conchita Martínez	6–0, 6–2
1998	(United States) Lindsay Davenport	(United States) Venus Williams	6–4, 5–7, 6–4
1999	(United States) Lindsay Davenport (2)	(United States) Venus Williams	7–6^{(7–1)}, 6–2
2000	(United States) Venus Williams	(United States) Lindsay Davenport	6–1, 6–4
2001	(Belgium) Kim Clijsters	(United States) Lindsay Davenport	6–4, 6–7^{(5–7)}, 6–1
2002	(United States) Venus Williams (2)	(Belgium) Kim Clijsters	6–3, 6–3
2003	(Belgium) Kim Clijsters (2)	(United States) Jennifer Capriati	4–6, 6–4, 6–2
2004	(United States) Lindsay Davenport (3)	(United States) Venus Williams	7–6^{(7–4)}, 5–7, 7–6^{(7–4)}
2005	(Belgium) Kim Clijsters (3)	(United States) Venus Williams	7–5, 6–2
2006	(Belgium) Kim Clijsters (4)	(Switzerland) Patty Schnyder	6–4, 6–2
2007	(Russia) Anna Chakvetadze	(India) Sania Mirza	6–3, 6–2
2008	(Canada) Aleksandra Wozniak	(France) Marion Bartoli	7–5, 6–3
↓ Premier tournament ↓
2009	(France) Marion Bartoli	(United States) Venus Williams	6–2, 5–7, 6–4
2010	(Belarus) Victoria Azarenka	(Russia) Maria Sharapova	6–4, 6–1
2011	(United States) Serena Williams	(France) Marion Bartoli	7–5, 6–1
2012	(United States) Serena Williams (2)	(United States) CoCo Vandeweghe	7–5, 6–3
2013	(Slovakia) Dominika Cibulková	(Poland) Agnieszka Radwańska	3–6, 6–4, 6–4
2014	(United States) Serena Williams (3)	(Germany) Angelique Kerber	7–6^{(7–1)}, 6–3
2015	(Germany) Angelique Kerber	(Czech Republic) Karolína Plíšková	6–3, 5–7, 6–4
2016	(United Kingdom) Johanna Konta	(United States) Venus Williams	7–5, 5–7, 6–2
2017	(United States) Madison Keys	(United States) Coco Vandeweghe	7–6^{(7–4)}, 6–4
2018	(Romania) Mihaela Buzărnescu	(Greece) Maria Sakkari	6–1, 6–0
2019	(China) Zheng Saisai	(Belarus) Aryna Sabalenka	6–3, 7–6^{(7–3)}
2020	Not held due to the COVID-19 pandemic		
↓ WTA 500 tournament ↓
2021	(United States) Danielle Collins	(Russia) Daria Kasatkina	6–3, 6–7^{(10–12)}, 6–1
2022	Daria Kasatkina	(United States) Shelby Rogers	6–7^{(2–7)}, 6–1, 6–2

=== Doubles ===
Year	Champions	Runners-up	Score
1971	(United States) Rosemary Casals (United States) Billie Jean King	(France) Françoise Dürr (United Kingdom) Ann Haydon-Jones	6–4, 6–7, 6–1
1972	(United States) Rosemary Casals (2) (United Kingdom) Virginia Wade	(France) Françoise Dürr (Australia) Judy Tegart Dalton	6–3, 5–7, 6–2
1973	(Australia) Margaret Court (Australia) Lesley Hunt	(United States) Wendy Overton (United States) Valerie Ziegenfuss	6–1, 7–5
1974	(United States) Chris Evert (United States) Billie Jean King (2)	(France) Françoise Dürr (Netherlands) Betty Stöve	6–4, 6–2
1975	(United States) Chris Evert (2) (United States) Billie Jean King (3)	(United States) Rosemary Casals (United Kingdom) Virginia Wade	6–2, 7–5
1976	(United States) Billie Jean King (4) (Netherlands) Betty Stöve	(United States) Rosemary Casals (France) Françoise Dürr	6–4, 6–1
1977	(Australia) Kerry Reid (South Africa) Greer Stevens	(United Kingdom) Sue Barker (United States) Ann Kiyomura	6–3, 6–1
1978	Not held		
1979	(United States) Rosemary Casals (3) (United States) Chris Evert (3)	(United States) Tracy Austin (Netherlands) Betty Stöve	3–6, 6–4, 6–3
1980	(United Kingdom) Sue Barker (United States) Ann Kiyomura	(South Africa) Greer Stevens (United Kingdom) Virginia Wade	6–0, 6–4
1981	(United States) Rosemary Casals (4) (Australia) Wendy Turnbull	(United States) Martina Navratilova (United Kingdom) Virginia Wade	6–1, 6–4
1982	(United States) Barbara Potter (United States) Sharon Walsh	(United States) Kathy Jordan (United States) Pam Shriver	6–1, 3–6, 7–6^{(7–5)}
1983	(West Germany) Claudia Kohde-Kilsch (West Germany) Eva Pfaff	(United States) Rosemary Casals (Australia) Wendy Turnbull	6–4, 4–6, 6–4
1984	(United States) Martina Navratilova (United States) Pam Shriver	(United States) Rosemary Casals (United States) Alycia Moulton	6–2, 6–3
1985	(Czechoslovakia) Hana Mandlíková (Australia) Wendy Turnbull	(South Africa) Rosalyn Fairbank (United States) Candy Reynolds	4–6, 7–5, 6–1
1986	(Czechoslovakia) Hana Mandlíková (2) (Australia) Wendy Turnbull (3)	(United States) Bonnie Gadusek (Czechoslovakia) Helena Suková	7–6^{(7–5)}, 6–1
1987	(Czechoslovakia) Hana Mandlíková (3) (Australia) Wendy Turnbull (4)	(United States) Zina Garrison (Argentina) Gabriela Sabatini	6–4, 7–6^{(7–4)}
1988	(United States) Rosemary Casals (5) (United States) Martina Navratilova (2)	(Czechoslovakia) Hana Mandlíková (Czechoslovakia) Jana Novotná	6–4, 6–4
1989	(United States) Patty Fendick (Canada) Jill Hetherington	(Soviet Union) Larisa Savchenko (Soviet Union) Natalia Zvereva	7–5, 3–6, 6–2
1990	(United States) Meredith McGrath (United States) Anne Smith	(South Africa) Rosalyn Fairbank (United States) Robin White	2–6, 6–0, 6–4
1991	(United States) Patty Fendick (2) (United States) Gigi Fernández	(United States) Martina Navratilova (United States) Pam Shriver	6–4, 7–5
1992	(United States) Gigi Fernández (2) (Commonwealth of Independent States) Natalia Zvereva	(South Africa) Rosalyn Fairbank-Nideffer (United States) Gretchen Rush Magers	3–6, 6–2, 6–4
1993	(United States) Patty Fendick (3) (United States) Meredith McGrath (2)	(South Africa) Amanda Coetzer (Argentina) Inés Gorrochategui	6–2, 6–0
1994	(United States) Lindsay Davenport (Spain) Arantxa Sánchez	(United States) Gigi Fernández (United States) Martina Navratilova	7–5, 6–4
1995	(United States) Lori McNeil (Czech Republic) Helena Suková	(United States) Katrina Adams (United States) Zina Garrison Jackson	3–6, 6–4, 6–3
1996	(United States) Lindsay Davenport (2) (United States) Mary Joe Fernández	(Romania) Irina Spîrlea (France) Nathalie Tauziat	6–1, 6–3
1997	(United States) Lindsay Davenport (3) (Switzerland) Martina Hingis	(Spain) Conchita Martínez (Argentina) Patricia Tarabini	6–1, 6–3
1998	(United States) Lindsay Davenport (4) (Belarus) Natasha Zvereva (2)	(Latvia) Larisa Savchenko Neiland (Ukraine) Elena Tatarkova	6–4, 6–4
1999	(United States) Lindsay Davenport (5) (United States) Corina Morariu	(Russia) Anna Kournikova (Russia) Elena Likhovtseva	6–4, 6–4
2000	(United States) Chanda Rubin (France) Sandrine Testud	(Zimbabwe) Cara Black (United States) Amy Frazier	6–4, 6–4
2001	(Chinese Taipei) Janet Lee (Indonesia) Wynne Prakusya	(United States) Nicole Arendt (Netherlands) Caroline Vis	3–6, 6–3, 6–3
2002	(United States) Lisa Raymond (Australia) Rennae Stubbs	(Slovakia) Janette Husárová (Spain) Conchita Martínez	6–1, 6–1
2003	(Zimbabwe) Cara Black (United States) Lisa Raymond (2)	(South Korea) Cho Yoon-jeong (Italy) Francesca Schiavone	7–6^{(7–5)}, 6–1
2004	(Greece) Eleni Daniilidou (Australia) Nicole Pratt	(Czech Republic) Iveta Benešová (Luxembourg) Claudine Schaul	6–2, 6–4
2005	(Zimbabwe) Cara Black (2) (Australia) Rennae Stubbs (2)	(Russia) Elena Likhovtseva (Russia) Vera Zvonareva	6–3, 7–5
2006	(Germany) Anna-Lena Grönefeld (Israel) Shahar Pe'er	(Italy) Maria Elena Camerin (Argentina) Gisela Dulko	6–1, 6–4
2007	(India) Sania Mirza (Israel) Shahar Pe'er (2)	(Belarus) Victoria Azarenka (Russia) Anna Chakvetadze	6–4, 7–6^{(7–5)}
2008	(Zimbabwe) Cara Black (3) (United States) Liezel Huber	(Russia) Elena Vesnina (Russia) Vera Zvonareva	6–4, 6–3
↓ Premier tournament ↓
2009	(United States) Serena Williams (United States) Venus Williams	(Chinese Taipei) Chan Yung-jan (Romania) Monica Niculescu	6–4, 6–1
2010	(United States) Lindsay Davenport (6) (United States) Liezel Huber (2)	(Chinese Taipei) Chan Yung-jan (China) Zheng Jie	7–5, 6–7^{(8–10)}, 10–8
2011	(Belarus) Victoria Azarenka (Russia) Maria Kirilenko	(United States) Liezel Huber (United States) Lisa Raymond	6–1, 6–3
2012	(New Zealand) Marina Erakovic (United Kingdom) Heather Watson	(Australia) Jarmila Gajdošová (United States) Vania King	7–5, 7–6^{(9–7)}
2013	(United States) Raquel Kops-Jones (United States) Abigail Spears	(Germany) Julia Görges (Croatia) Darija Jurak	6–2, 7–6^{(7–4)}
2014	(Spain) Garbiñe Muguruza (Spain) Carla Suárez Navarro	(Poland) Paula Kania (Czech Republic) Kateřina Siniaková	6–2, 4–6, [10–5]
2015	(China) Xu Yifan (China) Zheng Saisai	(Spain) Anabel Medina Garrigues (Spain) Arantxa Parra Santonja	6–1, 6–3
2016	(United States) Raquel Atawo (2) (United States) Abigail Spears (2)	(Croatia) Darija Jurak (Australia) Anastasia Rodionova	6–3, 6–4
2017	(United States) Abigail Spears (3) (United States) Coco Vandeweghe	(France) Alizé Cornet (Poland) Alicja Rosolska	6–2, 6–3
2018	(Chinese Taipei) Latisha Chan (Czech Republic) Květa Peschke	(Ukraine) Lyudmyla Kichenok (Ukraine) Nadiia Kichenok	6–4, 6–1
2019	(United States) Nicole Melichar (Czech Republic) Květa Peschke (2)	(Japan) Shuko Aoyama (Japan) Ena Shibahara	6–4, 6–4
2020	not held due to the coronavirus pandemic		
↓ WTA 500 tournament ↓
2021	(Croatia) Darija Jurak (Slovenia) Andreja Klepač	(Canada) Gabriela Dabrowski (Brazil) Luisa Stefani	6–1, 7–5
2022	(China) Xu Yifan (2) (China) Yang Zhaoxuan	(Japan) Shuko Aoyama (Chinese Taipei) Chan Hao-ching	7–5, 6–0

=== Date, name and venue history ===
Dates, Names and Venues
Year	Dates	Name	Venue
1971	6–9 Jan	British Motor Cars Invitation	San Francisco Civic Auditorium
1972	12–15 Jan	British Motor Cars Invitation	San Francisco Civic Auditorium
1973	week of 15 Jan	British Motor Cars Invitation	San Francisco Civic Auditorium
1974	week of 14 Jan	Virginia Slims of San Francisco	San Francisco Civic Auditorium
1975	week of 6 Jan	Virginia Slims of San Francisco	San Francisco Civic Auditorium
1976	week of 1 Mar	Virginia Slims of San Francisco	San Francisco Civic Auditorium
1977	week of 28 Feb	Virginia Slims of San Francisco	San Francisco Civic Auditorium
1978	Not held		
1979	8–14 Jan	Avon Championships of California	Oakland–Alameda County Coliseum Arena
1980	week of 11 Feb	Avon Championships of California	Oakland–Alameda County Coliseum Arena
1981	9–15 Feb	Avon Championships of California	Oakland–Alameda County Coliseum Arena
1982	22–28 Feb	Avon Championships of California	Oakland–Alameda County Coliseum Arena
1983	21–27 Feb	Virginia Slims of California	Oakland–Alameda County Coliseum Arena
1984	9–15 Jan	Virginia Slims of California	Oakland–Alameda County Coliseum Arena
1985	18–25 Feb	Virginia Slims of California	Oakland–Alameda County Coliseum Arena
1986	week of 24 Feb	Virginia Slims of California	Oakland–Alameda County Coliseum Arena
1987	week of 9 Feb	Virginia Slims of California	San Francisco
1988	15–21 Feb	Virginia Slims of California	Oakland–Alameda County Coliseum Arena
1989	20–26 Feb	Virginia Slims of California	Oakland–Alameda County Coliseum Arena
1990	29 Oct–4 Nov	Virginia Slims of California	Oakland–Alameda County Coliseum Arena
1991	4–10 Nov	Virginia Slims of California	Oakland–Alameda County Coliseum Arena
1992	2–8 Nov	Bank of the West Classic	Oakland–Alameda County Coliseum Arena
1993	1–7 Nov	Bank of the West Classic	Oakland–Alameda County Coliseum Arena
1994	week of 31 Oct	Bank of the West Classic	Oakland–Alameda County Coliseum Arena
1995	30 Oct–5 Nov	Bank of the West Classic	Oakland–Alameda County Coliseum Arena
1996	week of 4 Nov	Bank of the West Classic	Henry J Kaiser Arena
1997	21–27 Jul	Bank of the West Classic	Taube Tennis Center (Stanford)
1998	27 Jul–2 Aug	Bank of the West Classic	Taube Tennis Center (Stanford)
1999	26 Jul–1 Aug	Bank of the West Classic	Taube Tennis Center (Stanford)
2000	24–30 Jul	Bank of the West Classic	Taube Tennis Center (Stanford)
2001	23–29 Jul	Bank of the West Classic	Taube Tennis Center (Stanford)
2002	22–28 Jul	Bank of the West Classic	Taube Tennis Center (Stanford)
2003	21–27 Jul	Bank of the West Classic	Taube Tennis Center (Stanford)
2004	week of 12 Jul	Bank of the West Classic	Taube Tennis Center (Stanford)
2005	week of 25 Jul	Bank of the West Classic	Taube Tennis Center (Stanford)
2006	24–30 Jul	Bank of the West Classic	Taube Tennis Center (Stanford)
2007	week of 23 Jul	Bank of the West Classic	Taube Tennis Center (Stanford)
2008	12–20 Jul	Bank of the West Classic	Taube Tennis Center (Stanford)
2009	25 Jul–2 Aug	Bank of the West Classic	Taube Tennis Center (Stanford)
2010	24 Jul–1 Aug	Bank of the West Classic	Taube Tennis Center (Stanford)
2011	23–31 Jul	Bank of the West Classic	Taube Tennis Center (Stanford)
2012	9–15 Jul	Bank of the West Classic	Taube Tennis Center (Stanford)
2013	21–28 Jul	Bank of the West Classic	Taube Tennis Center (Stanford)
2014	26 Jul–3 Aug	Bank of the West Classic	Taube Tennis Center (Stanford)
2015	1–9 Aug	Bank of the West Classic	Taube Tennis Center (Stanford)
2016	18-24 Jul	Bank of the West Classic	Taube Tennis Center (Stanford)
2017	31 Jul–6 Aug	Bank of the West Classic	Taube Tennis Center (Stanford)
2018	30 Jul–5 Aug	Silicon Valley Classic	San Jose State University
