= Madison Keys =

American tennis player (born 1995)

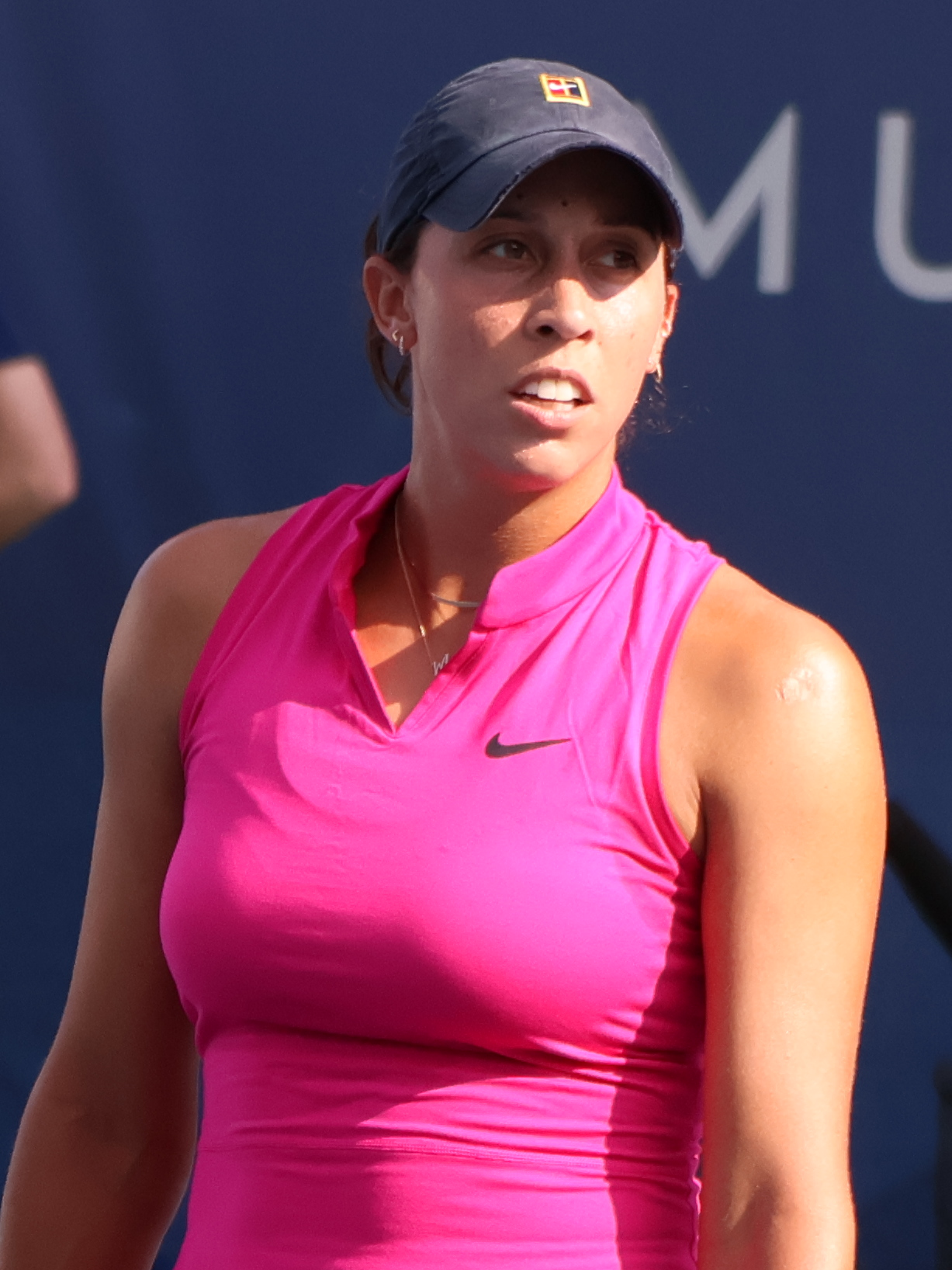
- Keys at the 2023 DC Open
- Country (sports): United States
- Residence: Orlando, Florida, US
- Born: February 17, 1995 (age 31) Rock Island, Illinois, US
- Height: 5 ft 10 in (178 cm)
- Turned pro: February 17, 2009
- Plays: Right-handed (two-handed backhand)
- Coach: Bjorn Fratangelo (2023–)
- Prize money: US$ 25,287,737: 22nd all-time in earnings

Singles
- Career record: 456–249
- Career titles: 11
- Highest ranking: No. 5 (February 24, 2025)
- Current ranking: No. 20 (October 12, 2026)

Grand Slam singles results
- Australian Open: W (2025)
- French Open: SF (2018)
- Wimbledon: QF (2015, 2023)
- US Open: F (2017)

Other tournaments
- Tour Finals: RR (2016, 2025)
- Olympic Games: SF – 4th (2016)

Doubles
- Career record: 29–40
- Career titles: 0
- Highest ranking: No. 56 (October 24, 2022)

Grand Slam doubles results
- Australian Open: 3R (2014)
- French Open: SF (2022)
- Wimbledon: 2R (2014)
- US Open: 2R (2012)

Grand Slam mixed doubles results
- US Open: 2R (2022)

Team competitions
- Fed Cup: F (2018), record 6–6
- Last updated on: October 6, 2026.

Madison Keys (born February 17, 1995) is an American professional tennis player. She has been ranked as high as world No. 5 by the WTA. Keys has won eleven career singles titles, including a major at the 2025 Australian Open. She was also the runner-up at the 2017 US Open.

Keys was inspired to play tennis after watching Venus Williams at Wimbledon. She turned professional on her 14th birthday, and a few months later became one of the youngest players to win a WTA Tour-level match. She had her breakthrough in 2015 by reaching the Australian Open semifinals as a teenager, and debuted in the top 10 of the WTA rankings in 2016. Keys reached the US Open final in 2017, losing to Sloane Stephens. Following years of injury struggles and weaker results, Keys won her first major title at the 2025 Australian Open, defeating world No. 2 Iga Świątek and world No. 1 Aryna Sabalenka consecutively.

Keys' playing style has allowed her to become a top American tennis player, using a fast serve and powerful forehand. Key holds at least one title per court surface, and has reached the quarterfinals at every major.

== Early life and background ==
Keys was born on February 17, 1995, in Rock Island, one of the Quad Cities in northwestern Illinois. Her parents Rick and Christine are both attorneys, and her father was a Division III All-American college basketball player at Augustana College. She has an older sister named Sydney and two younger sisters named Montana and Hunter, none of whom play tennis. Keys' passion for tennis started at a young age. Her interest in the sport arose from watching Wimbledon on television when she was four years old. Keys asked her parents for a white tennis dress like the one Venus Williams was wearing, and they offered to get her one if she started playing tennis. Her father said that after this bargain, "All [Madison] did was try to hit balls into the next yard — home runs."

Keys started playing tennis at the Quad-City Tennis Club in Moline. She began taking lessons regularly at seven and began competing in tournaments at the age of nine. When she was ten years old, she moved to Florida with her mother and younger sisters so that she could train at the Evert Tennis Academy founded by John Evert and also partly run by his sister, International Tennis Hall of Famer Chris Evert. At first, John said that he "thought she was very athletic, a raw talent physically. She definitely needed to be cleaned up with her strokes." Keys noted that her game was very different when she was starting out at the academy compared to how it is as a pro, saying, "I didn't like groundstrokes, I didn't like long points that much, so I would just run into the net and try and volley." Nonetheless, Keys's coaches had high hopes for her. Chris said, "At 12 years old, she's pretty much an all-court player; she's not one-dimensional, which is pretty rare in this day and age."

== Career ==
=== Juniors ===
When Keys was 12 years old, she went 23–2 in her girls 12s matches, including a perfect 19–0 in 2007. Her most notable title was a victory at the 12-and-under Junior Orange Bowl. At the age of 13, Keys began competing in 18-and-under ITF events. In January 2009, she won the Copa del Café, a high-level Grade 1 tournament in Costa Rica, to become the first American winner of the girls' event in its 26-year history. Later that year, her coach John Evert remarked that, "She's got weapons at a very young age. Most of the top players in the world have weapons, but it takes some time to develop them. Madison at the age of 14 can hit her serve or her forehand as big as most of the girls, and some of the top girls, on the pro tour."

As a 15-year-old, Keys played in just five ITF Junior Circuit events, instead opting to play in eight ITF Pro Circuit events over the same period. Her best result that year was winning both the singles and doubles titles at the Grade B1 Pan American Closed ITF Championships, which is the highest level of regional tournament on the junior tour. After the 2011 US Open, Keys moved to the pro tour full-time. She was ranked No. 16 in the ITF junior rankings at the time, a personal best. At this stage of her career, she was already 5' 10", serving at 115 miles per hour (185 km/h), and could hit strong forehand and backhand winners.

=== 2009–2012: WTA Tour match win at age 14 ===
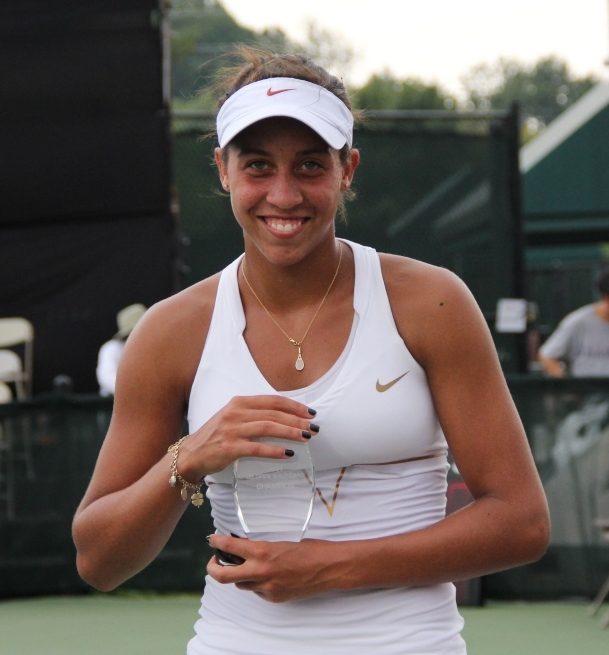
Keys holding the trophy after winning the 2011 US Open Wildcard Playoff

Keys turned pro in February 2009 on her 14th birthday. She made her WTA Tour debut a few months later at the Ponte Vedra Beach Championships, having played in only one previous professional tournament where she lost her only match. In her debut, she defeated world No. 81, Alla Kudryavtseva, in straight sets. At the age of 14 years and 48 days, she became the seventh-youngest player ever to win a WTA Tour-level match and the youngest since Martina Hingis in 1994. Top seed Nadia Petrova knocked Keys out of the tournament in the next round. Due to the tour's age restriction policy, she was unable to enter another WTA tournament that year. Nonetheless, Keys found another opportunity to play against the top professionals by participating in the World TeamTennis league as a member of the Philadelphia Freedoms. Still only 14 years old, she beat Serena Williams in a set to five games. Williams was ranked No. 2 in the world at the time and had just won Wimbledon earlier that month.

During her early years, Keys played mostly on the ITF Circuit, where she won three titles in singles and one in doubles. Her next opportunity to play on the WTA Tour came in March 2011, when she was awarded a wild card into the Miami Open. Keys was defeated by No. 41, Patty Schnyder, in the first round, despite having a chance to serve for the match. Several months later, Keys won an invitational playoff to earn one of the American wild card spots in the main draw of the US Open. She defeated fellow American Jill Craybas in her Grand Slam tournament debut to become the youngest match winner at the event in six years at the age of 16. Keys also won an invitational playoff to compete at the 2012 Australian Open but was unable to get past the first round.

=== 2013: Top 50 debut, top 10 victory ===
Keys began the year ranked No. 149 in the world. Having made it to relatively few WTA main draws in previous years, Keys played only tour-level events in 2013. At the Sydney International, Keys reached the quarterfinals of a WTA event for the first time, defeating Lucie Šafářová and Zheng Jie, the two players who had beaten her in her first two majors. For the second straight year, Keys won the Australian Open Wildcard Playoff. At the Australian Open, she beat Casey Dellacqua and No. 30 Tamira Paszek to reach the third round, before bowing out to No. 5, Angelique Kerber. With this success, she entered the top 100 of the WTA rankings at No. 81 a month before turning 18.

In the clay-court season, Keys reached another quarterfinal at the Charleston Open before losing to Venus Williams, one of her childhood idols, in their first-ever meeting. She next played at the Madrid Open and defeated world No. 6 Li Na, not long after nearly beating her in Sydney earlier in the year. This was Keys's first victory over a top 10 opponent. Keys concluded the clay-court season with a second-round appearance in her French Open debut. At Wimbledon, she used a second consecutive third-round appearance to break into the top 50.

Keys had a relatively quiet stretch following Wimbledon. In October, she finished her season at the Japan Open in Osaka, where she reached her first WTA Tour semifinal. She lost to the eventual champion Samantha Stosur. After a successful year on the tour, Keys finished the year ranked No. 37, an improvement of over 100 places from the start of the season.

=== 2014: First career title ===
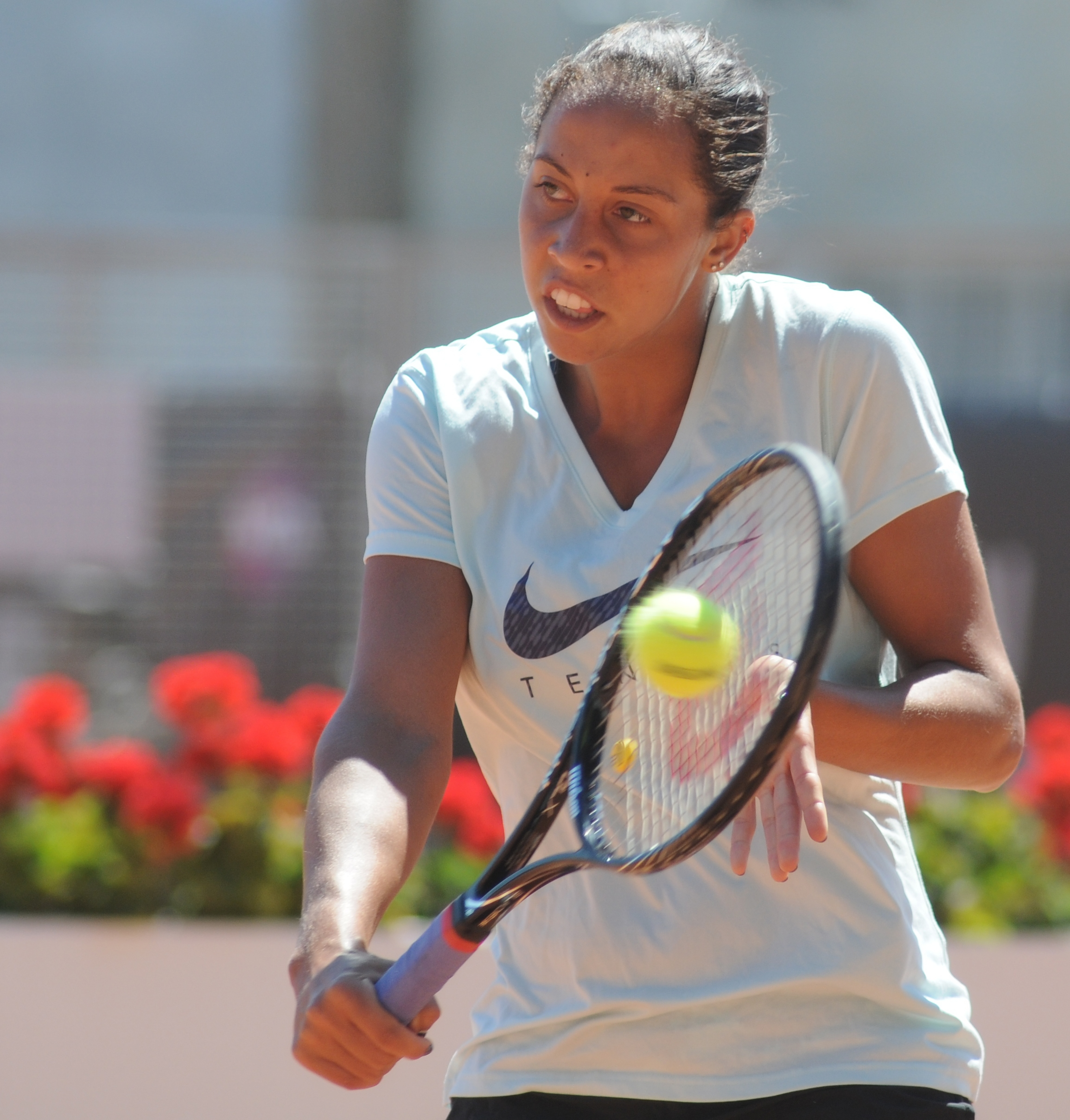
Keys at the 2014 Italian Open

In Keys' second tournament of the year, she returned to the Sydney International and made her first Premier semifinal. She cruised past No. 11, Simona Halep, in the first round before losing to No. 9, Angelique Kerber. She next played at the Australian Open, but was upset by Zheng Jie in the second round after dropping a double break advantage in the final set. In February, Keys made her Fed Cup debut against Italy. She lost her only singles match to Camila Giorgi but managed to win the dead rubber doubles match with Lauren Davis as the United States lost the tie. Keys again participated in Fed Cup in April. The United States lost this tie to France 3–2 and were bounced from the top-tier World Group. Keys won her first Fed Cup match against Alizé Cornet but was unable to win her next singles match or the decisive doubles rubber with Sloane Stephens.

Keys entered the Internationaux de Strasbourg having won back-to-back matches just once since Sydney. She was able to regain her form in France and reached the semifinal at the tournament. At the French Open, she drew tenth-seed Sara Errani, a clay court specialist, and lost in the first round. In the grass-court season, Keys won her first career title at the Eastbourne International, a Premier-level tournament. She defeated two top-ten players at the event, No. 7 Jelena Janković in the first round and No. 9 Kerber in the final. This was her only ever victory over Kerber, who would dominate Keys in their future matches. During the final, she also hit a 126 miles per hour (203 km/h) serve, which would have been the fifth fastest ever on record in women's tennis history if the tournament were officially collecting serve-speed data. The title made the 19-year-old Keys the youngest American titlist since Vania King in 2006 and the first teenage titlist since Caroline Wozniacki in 2009. Keys maintained that form to reach the third round at Wimbledon but was forced to retire due to a leg injury.

Keys won fewer than half of her matches the remainder of the season. One of her best results came at the Cincinnati Open, where she beat an in-form Cornet, before pushing No. 6 Maria Sharapova to three sets in the second round. At the US Open, Keys was seeded for the first time at a major at No. 27 but suffered a disappointing second-round loss to qualifier Aleksandra Krunić. She closed the year by reaching the quarterfinals at the Japan Open. Keys maintained a steady ranking inside the top 50 throughout the year and finished the season at No. 31 in the world.

=== 2015: Australian Open semifinal, top 20 ===
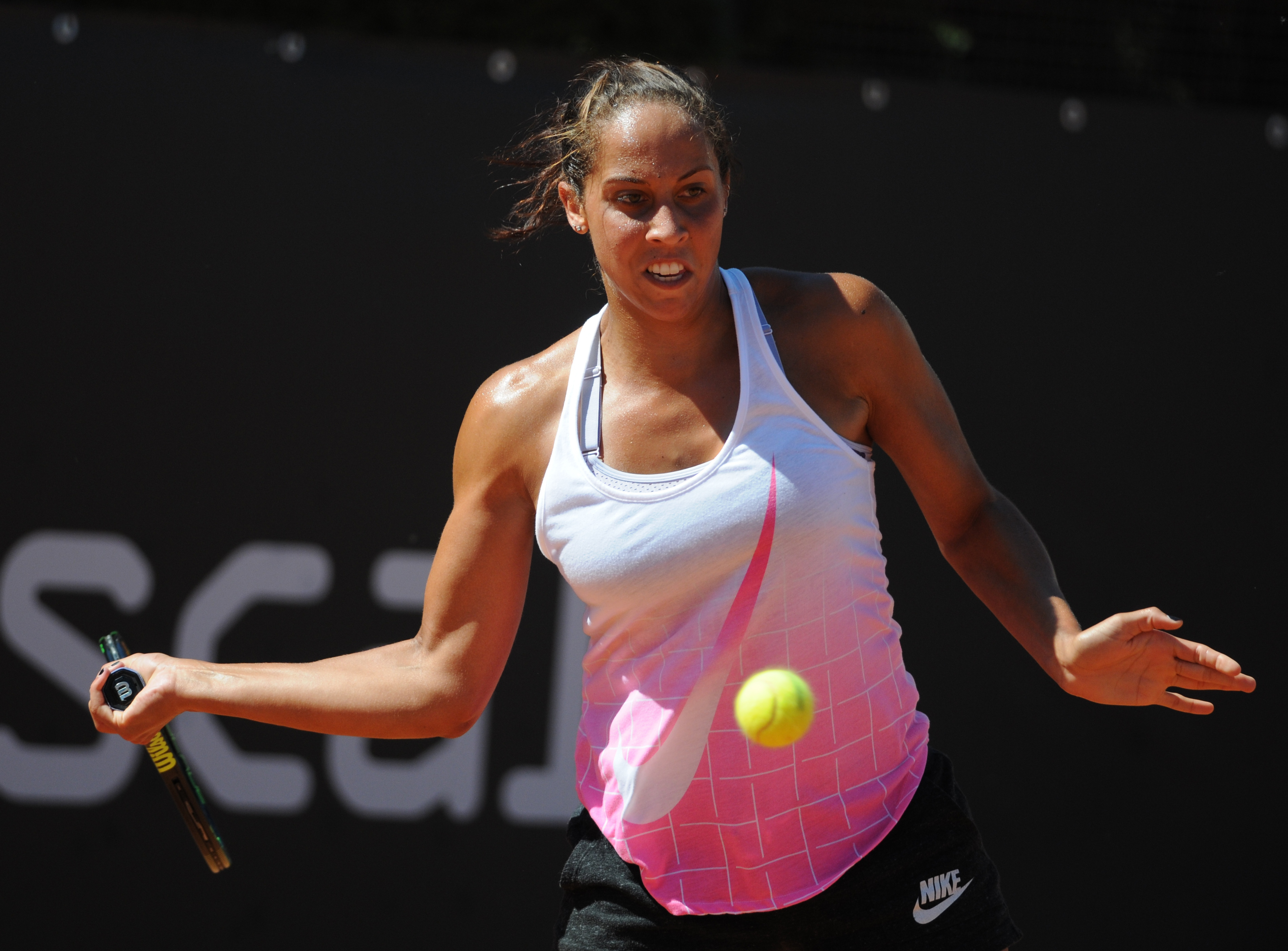
Keys at the 2015 Italian Open

In the off-season, Keys began working with former world No. 1, Lindsay Davenport, as well as her husband Jon Leach. With her new coaching team, Keys made her breakthrough into the upper echelon of women's tennis at the Australian Open. She upset reigning Wimbledon champion and No. 4, Petra Kvitová, in straight sets in the third round. In the quarterfinals, Keys got a second opportunity to face off against Venus Williams, who was ranked No. 18 in the world. She defeated Venus for the first time in a tight three-set match, despite injuring her left thigh in the middle of the second set. This set up a clash with world No. 1, Serena Williams, in the semifinals. After a very tight first set, Keys ultimately lost in straight sets. After the match, Serena, who eventually went on to capture the title, spoke of a bright future for Keys, saying, "It was an honor for me to play someone who will be No. 1 in the future." With her first major semifinal, Keys climbed into the top 20 for the first time.

Keys failed to carry her momentum through the early-year hardcourt season. Nonetheless, she continued to impress once the clay-court season came around. She reached the final at the Charleston Open, losing to Angelique Kerber after conceding a 4–1 lead in the third set. As the 16th seed at the French Open, Keys made it to the third round before falling to 23rd seed Timea Bacsinszky, in straight sets. She then continued her series of strong performances at majors by reaching the quarterfinals at Wimbledon.

At the US Open, Keys advanced to the fourth round, where she was defeated by Serena Williams at a major for the second time this year. Keys finished the season with a high enough ranking to qualify for the inaugural WTA Elite Trophy, a year-end tournament similar to the top-tier WTA Finals for the top-ranked players who did not qualify for those higher level finals. Keys finished in second place in her three-person round-robin group, ahead of Zheng Saisai whom she beat and behind top overall seed Venus Williams whom she lost to in a close match. As the group winner, Venus was the only player to advance to the finals and ultimately won the tournament. After the season was over, Keys split from her coaching team in order to find a full-time coach, a role Davenport was unable to fulfill due to commitments to her family and to her job as a commentator.

=== 2016: No. 7, WTA Finals berth ===
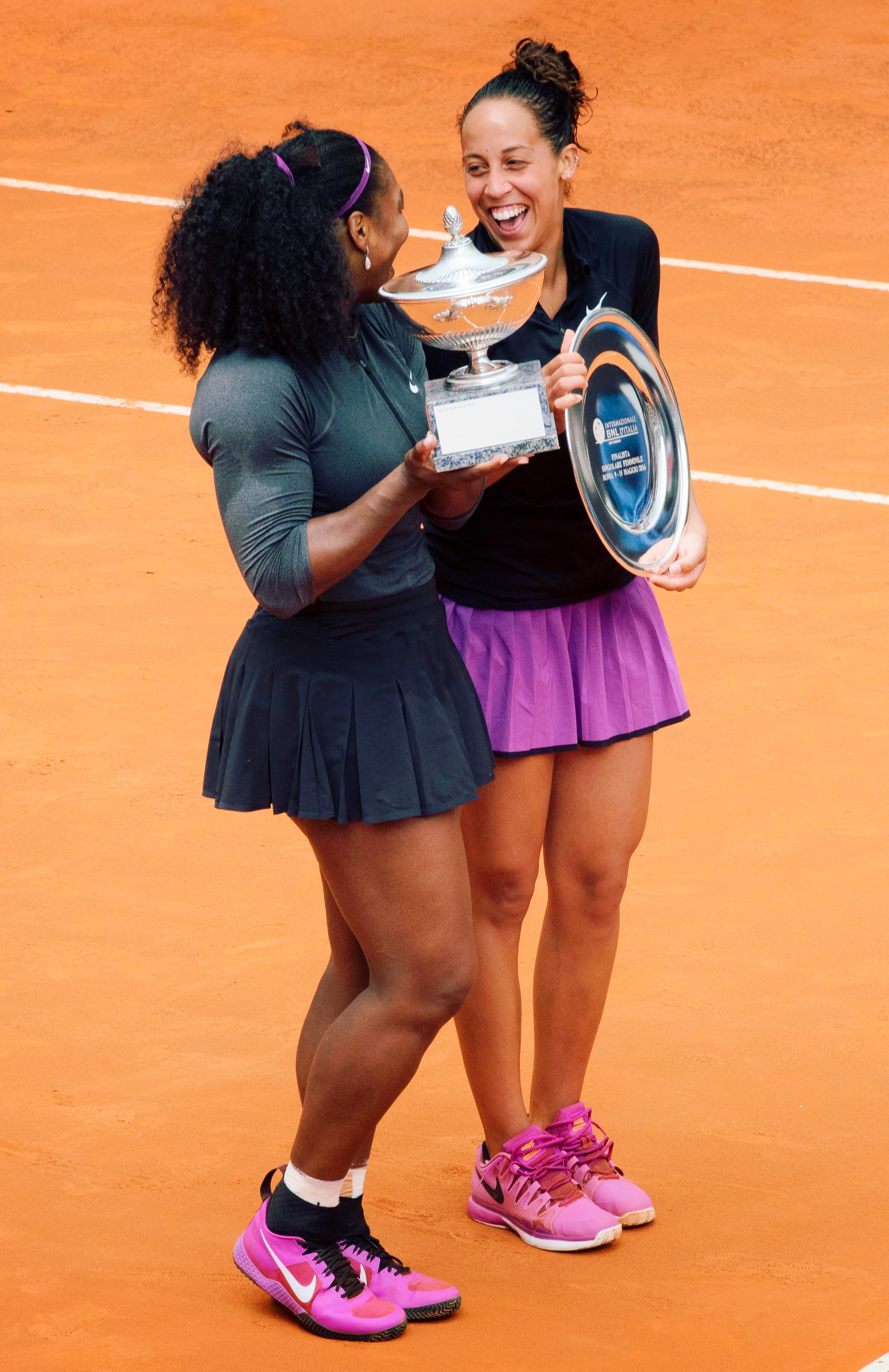
Keys and Serena Williams at 2016 Italian Open trophy presentation

Keys began the year ranked No. 18 in the world. She reached the fourth round at the Australian Open, where she lost to qualifier Zhang Shuai in a match where she was ahead up until she started to experience pain in her leg in the second set. She did not play again until the Indian Wells Open. At the Miami Open, Keys produced another good result with her first quarterfinal at a Premier Mandatory event.

During the clay-court season, Keys hired Thomas Högstedt to be her coach. She would drop Jesse Levine, who had been coaching her since the start of the year, from her team within the next few weeks. Her new partnership quickly proved to be successful with Keys reaching the final at the Italian Open leading up to the French Open, her first final at a Premier 5 event and the biggest of her career. During the event, she defeated two top-ten players in No. 9 Petra Kvitová and No. 4 Garbiñe Muguruza. She lost in the final to compatriot and world No. 1, Serena Williams, in straight sets. At the French Open, Keys won her first three matches in straight sets before unexpectedly falling to unseeded Kiki Bertens in the fourth round.

Nonetheless, Keys followed up a strong clay-court season with an excellent grass-court season, highlighted by her second career title at the Birmingham Classic. With this victory at a Premier-level event, she moved into the top ten for the first time in her career at the age of 21, becoming the first American woman to do so since Serena Williams in 1999. Compatriots CoCo Vandeweghe and Sloane Stephens followed suit with their own top ten debuts in 2017 and 2018 respectively. Seeded No. 9 at Wimbledon, Keys advanced to the fourth round, where she was defeated by No. 5 Simona Halep despite winning the first set. Later that month, Keys reached her second consecutive Premier 5 final at the Canadian Open in Montreal, where she again lost to Halep. Her next tournament was the Olympic singles event in Rio de Janeiro. As the No. 7 seed, Keys reached the semifinals, where she was eliminated by Kerber. She then lost the bronze medal match to Kvitová in three sets, narrowly missing out on a medal.

At the US Open as the eighth seed, Keys was able to reach the fourth round after a miraculous comeback against teenager Naomi Osaka in her third round match, where she overcame a 5–1 deficit in the third set. She then lost to Caroline Wozniacki, thereby exiting all four major tournaments that year in the fourth round. Nonetheless, Keys was still in contention for a spot in the WTA Finals in Singapore, being ranked No. 9 at the time with the top eight in the WTA rankings getting invited to the event. She stayed in the race by making the quarterfinals at the Wuhan Open. She then reached the semifinals in back-to-back weeks at the China Open in Beijing and the Linz Open in Austria. As a result, she was able to qualify for Singapore a week before the tournament. Making her debut at the event, Keys defeated Dominika Cibulková but lost her other two matches. She did not advance out of the round-robin stage, with Cibulková instead making it to the final rounds through the tiebreak criteria and ultimately winning the event. Keys finished the year ranked No. 8 in the world, becoming the first American other than the Williams sisters to finish a year with a top-10 ranking since Lindsay Davenport in 2005. Despite her successful year, Keys ended her partnership with coach Högstedt in November.

=== 2017: Injury struggles, US Open runner-up ===
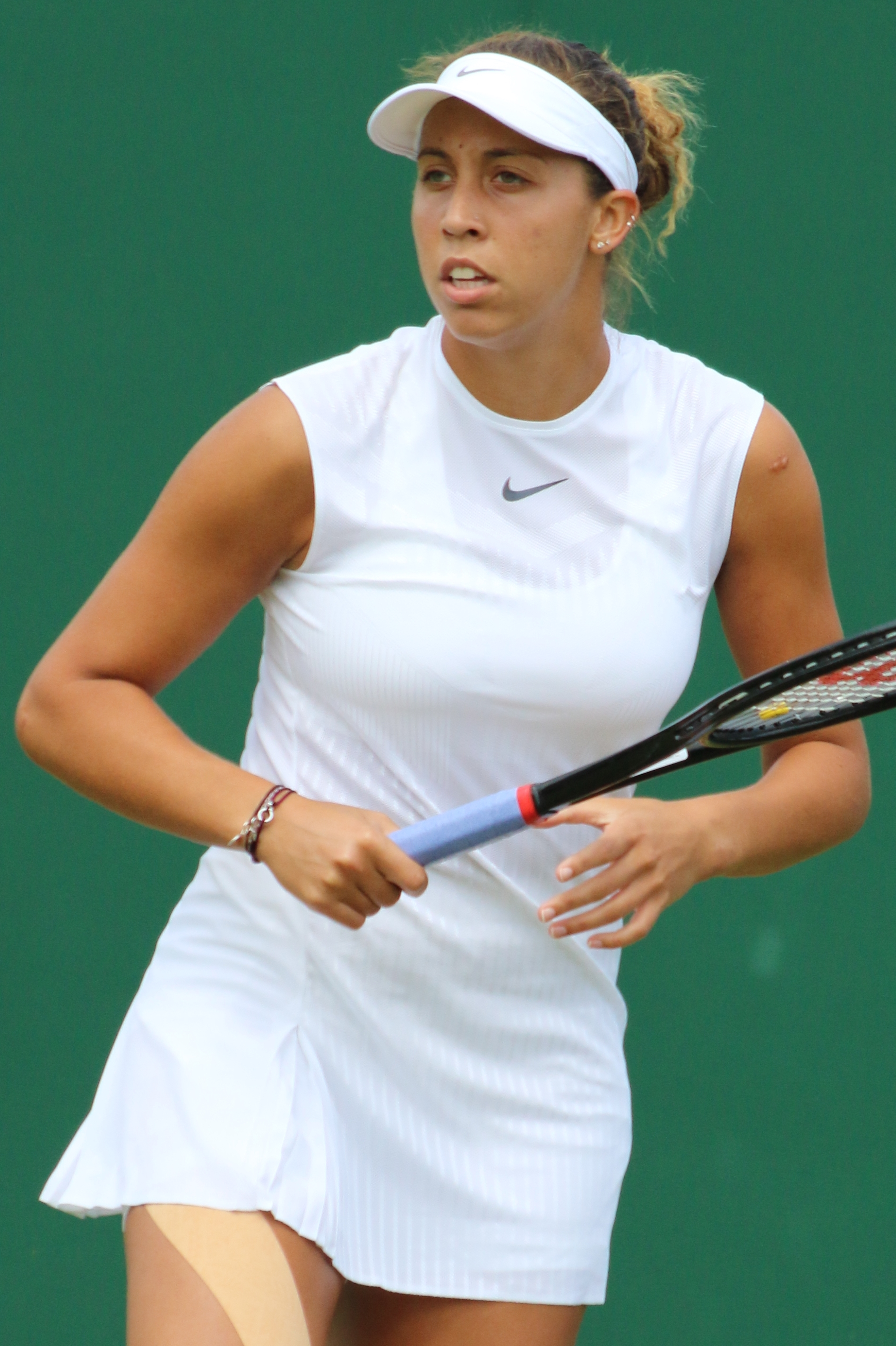
Keys at the 2017 Wimbledon Championships

Before the beginning of the season, Keys had surgery to repair her injured left wrist, which she hurt over a year earlier at the 2015 US Open. She was aware of the injury in the middle of 2016 and was planning on having surgery after the 2016 US Open. However, she decided to delay surgery in order to attempt to qualify for the year-end WTA Finals for the first time. Also during the off-season, Keys rekindled her relationship with Davenport and brought her back as her primary coach.

Due to surgery, Keys missed the Australian Open and did not return to the tennis scene until March at the Indian Wells Open. Although she would make it to the third round at the tournament, Keys would begin a long period of struggles that lasted deep into the summer. During this period, she also had a second surgery on her wrist after the French Open. Keys did not win back-to-back matches again until the Stanford Classic in August. By this point, her ranking had fallen out of the top 20. Despite entering the Premier-level tournament with only six wins on the season, Keys won the event after knocking out Wimbledon champion Garbiñe Muguruza in the semifinals and close friend CoCo Vandeweghe in the final in their first ever meeting. This was her third career title. Keys then defeated Vandeweghe in her very next match at the Cincinnati Open, but this time she was stopped by Muguruza in the third round.

Keys next played at the US Open. In the fourth round, she upset fourth seed Elina Svitolina to join fellow Americans CoCo Vandeweghe, Sloane Stephens, and Venus Williams in the quarterfinals. All four of them would win their matches to set up an all-American semifinal. This was the first time four Americans made the semifinals at a major since Wimbledon in 1985 and the first occurrence at the US Open since 1979. In the semifinals, Keys defeated Vandeweghe for the third time in a little over a month, losing just three games. Stephens won the other semifinal. These victories made Keys and Stephens the first Americans other than the Williams sisters to reach a women's major tournament final since Keys's coach Lindsay Davenport in 2005. Bidding to become the first American US Open champion other than the Williams sisters since Davenport in 1998, Keys lost in the final to her close friend in straight sets.

=== 2018: French and US Open semifinals ===
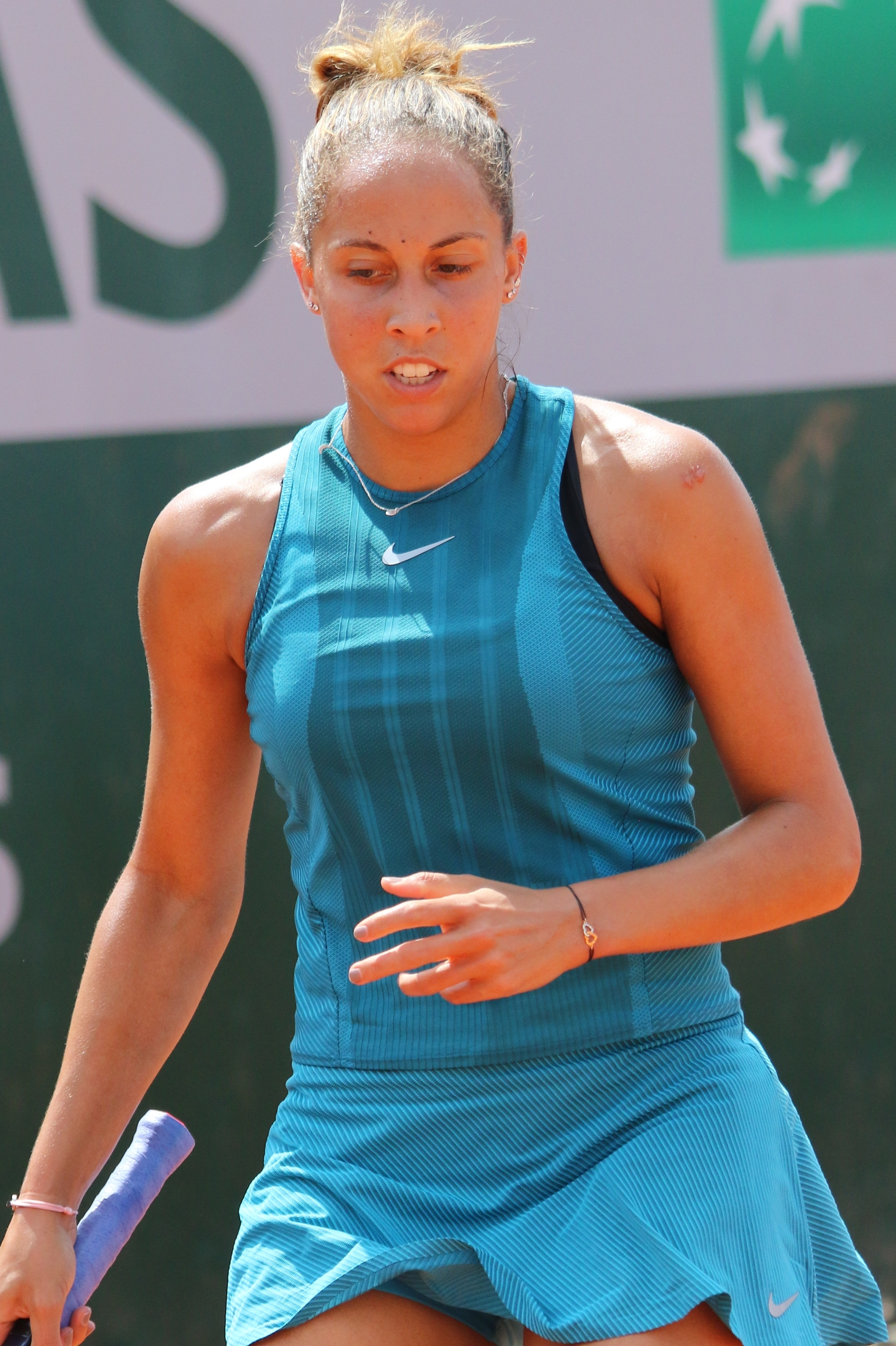
Keys at the 2018 French Open

Keys entered the year having played in just one tournament since the US Open final. At the first major of the year, Keys defeated No. 8 Caroline Garcia to reach the quarterfinals of the Australian Open for the second time. In this round, she lost to Angelique Kerber, one of her most difficult opponents. Outside of the Australian Open, Keys won just one match in the first three months of the year. She ended the early-year hardcourt season with a retirement due to a left thigh injury against Victoria Azarenka at the Miami Open in Azarenka's comeback tournament.

In April, Keys returned to Fed Cup competition in the semifinal against France. She defeated Pauline Parmentier in her only match to clinch the tie and put the United States in the final. At the French Open, Keys produced the best result of her career at the tournament. She reached the semifinals without dropping a set to set up a rematch of the 2017 US Open final with Sloane Stephens. This was the first all-American semifinal at the French Open since 2002. Keys again lost to Stephens in straight sets. She only played one grass-court event, losing in the third round at Wimbledon.

In the latter half of the season, Keys struggled with different injuries and also was competing without a primary coach. She did not attempt to defend her title at the Silicon Valley Classic, withdrawing due to a right wrist injury before the start of the event. Keys only played in one tournament during the US Open Series, reaching the quarterfinals at the Cincinnati Open. During the event, she snapped a five-match losing streak against reigning Wimbledon champion and world No. 4, Angelique Kerber. At the US Open, Keys made it to the semifinals while dropping just one set. However, she was unable to reach the final for a second straight year after losing to the eventual champion Naomi Osaka. Keys could not convert any of her 13 break points during the match. Following the US Open, Keys played in three tournaments during the Asian hardcourt season and needed to withdraw or retire from all three due to a left knee injury. At the WTA Elite Trophy, she advanced out of her round-robin group through the tiebreak criteria after defeating Daria Kasatkina and losing to hometown favorite Wang Qiang. However, she decided to cede her spot in the semifinals to Wang due to injury. She also did not make herself available for the Fed Cup final, which a short-handed United States team lost to the Czech Republic. Keys finished the season ranked No. 17 in the world.

=== 2019: First clay court & Premier 5 titles ===
Keys began the season at the Australian Open, where she lost in the fourth round to Elina Svitolina. She only played in two more tournaments during the early-year hardcourt season, losing her opening matches at both the Indian Wells Open and the Miami Open. Nonetheless, Keys was able to bounce back in the clay-court season. After returning to her former coach Juan Todero, she won her first career WTA Tour clay-court title at the Charleston Open. During the tournament, she recorded her first wins over Sloane Stephens and Caroline Wozniacki in the quarterfinals and the final, respectively, despite having never won a set against either player. She continued her clay-court success at the French Open, where she lost in the quarterfinals to the eventual champion, Ashleigh Barty.

Despite entering the Cincinnati Open in August on a three-match losing streak, and having won multiple matches at just three events all season, Keys won the tournament for her first Premier 5 title, and the fifth of her career. She upset No. 4 and reigning Wimbledon champion Simona Halep in the third round, having lost five consecutive matches against the Romanian, before defeating Venus Williams in the quarterfinals and Svetlana Kuznetsova in the final. With the title, Keys returned to the top 10 for the first time since June 2018. At her next two tournaments, Keys won multiple matches as well. She reached the fourth round of the US Open, establishing a career-high nine match winning streak, before losing to Svitolina for the second time at a major this year. She then retired against Angelique Kerber in the third set of the quarterfinals at the Pan Pacific Open and lost to compatriot Jennifer Brady in the second round at the China Open. Keys closed out her season at the WTA Elite Trophy. With a loss to Zheng Saisai and a win over Petra Martić, she finished tied for first in her round robin group, but did not advance due to the tiebreak criteria. She ended the year ranked No. 13 in the world, her fifth consecutive year-end top 20 ranking.

=== 2020: Brisbane final ===
Keys started the season strongly by reaching the final at the Brisbane International, her first career final during the early hardcourt season. She defeated former major champions, Samantha Stosur and Petra Kvitová, en route, before falling to Karolína Plíšková in a tight three-set match. Seeded tenth at the Australian Open, Keys recorded straight set victories over Daria Kasatkina and Arantxa Rus in her first two matches but fell to 20th seed Maria Sakkari in the third round.

Keys did not play the rest of the early hardcourt season and was next scheduled to play in Indian Wells, but play was suspended before the tournament began due to the COVID-19 pandemic. When the tour resumed in August, Keys made her return at the Cincinnati Open where she was the defending champion. However, she lost her opening match to Ons Jabeur in the second round after receiving a bye in the first. Due to several of the top 10 players withdrawing from the US Open citing safety concerns, Keys was seeded seventh and considered a serious contender for the title. She breezed through her first two matches, winning in straight sets over Tímea Babos and Aliona Bolsova. Unfortunately in the third round, after losing the first-set tiebreak and serving at 2–3 in the second set against Alizé Cornet, Keys was forced to retire from the match due to a neck injury, marking her earliest exit from the US Open since 2014, snapping a streak of five consecutive runs to the second week. She recovered in time to play at the French Open, where she was seeded twelfth. However she was upset in the first round by Zhang Shuai in straight sets, marking the first time Keys lost in the opening round at a major since the 2014 French Open. She ended the year ranked No. 16 in the world, her sixth consecutive year-end top 20 ranking.

=== 2021: Out of top 50 ===
Seeded 25th, Keys reached the fourth round at Wimbledon defeating 13th seed Elise Mertens, in straight sets.

She made her debut at the US Open in mixed doubles with Bjorn Fratangelo, whom she began dating four years ago.

=== 2022: Sixth title, major semifinals ===
After opening her season with a second round loss to Daria Kasatkina at the Melbourne Summer Set 2, Keys rebounded by winning her first title since August 2019 at the 2022 Adelaide International 2, defeating compatriot Alison Riske in the final with victories over Elina Svitolina and Coco Gauff in earlier rounds. Unseeded at the Australian Open, she reached the semifinals for the second time, defeating, in order, 2020 Australian Open champion Sofia Kenin, eighth seed Paula Badosa and fourth seed Barbora Krejčíková along the way. She lost to world number one and eventual champion, Ashleigh Barty, in the semifinals. Nonetheless, by virtue of reaching her fifth career major semifinal (and her first since the 2018 US Open), she rose back inside the top 30 for the first time since August 2021 as well as equaled her match win total from the previous year.

Continuing the early hardcourt season, Keys lost both of her opening matches at her next two tournaments in Mexico, but rebounded at Indian Wells. After receiving a first-round bye, she defeated Misaki Doi, Riske, and Harriet Dart to reach her first WTA 1000 quarterfinal since her 2019 Cincinnati title. Although she was beaten by eventual champion Iga Świątek in a lopsided match (winning only one game), it marked her best finish in Indian Wells to date. Her next tournament in Miami ended quickly though, falling to Anhelina Kalinina in her second-round match.

Keys began her clay-court season in Charleston once again. Although seeded ninth in the draw, she received a first-round bye after defending champion Veronika Kudermetova withdrew just before the first day of play commenced. She easily defeated Ulrikke Eikeri in straight sets before succumbing to reigning Olympic gold medalist and eventual champion Belinda Bencic in the third round. Beginning the European clay-court swing in Madrid, Keys received an unlucky draw, ultimately falling short against world No. 5, Maria Sakkari, in a tight three-setter.

Seeded 22nd, at the French Open she reached the fourth round in singles where she beat 16th seed Rybakina in the third round before losing to 29th seed Kudermetova but had more success in doubles where she reached the semifinals of a major for the first time in her career with Taylor Townsend as a protected ranking pair on their debut. As a result, she returned to the top 25 in the singles rankings and reached the top 100 in doubles at world No. 98, on June 6, 2022.

At the Canadian Open, she reached the quarterfinals of a WTA 1000 level for the first time in doubles, partnering Sania Mirza where they defeated top seeds Elise Mertens and Veronika Kudermetova. Next, they defeated Sofia Kenin and Yulia Putintseva to reach the semifinals.

At the Cincinnati Open, she reached the quarterfinals defeating top seed in the third round Iga Świątek in straight sets, after five unsuccessful attempts to victory over the reigning world No. 1. Next, she defeated reigning Wimbledon champion Elena Rybakina to reach her ninth career semifinal at a WTA 1000 level before losing to Petra Kvitová.

Seeded 20th, at the US Open, Keys was defeated by Coco Gauff in straight sets. She finished the year ranked No. 11, her highest finish since 2016.

=== 2023: United Cup champion, US Open semis, top 10 ===
Playing as part of Team USA at the first edition of the United Cup, Keys won all five of her matches, defeating Marie Bouzková, Jule Niemeier, Katie Swan, Magda Linette, and Lucia Bronzetti en route to the title. Her success at this event allowed her to go back to world No. 10 in the rankings. This marked Keys' first return to the top ten since August 2019. At the Australian Open, seeded No. 10, Keys lost in the third round to Victoria Azarenka in three sets, after winning the first set 6–1. Keys had 39 unforced errors compared to 18 for Azarenka. At Dubai, she reached the quarterfinals defeating fourth seed Caroline Garcia, her first top-10 win of the season, and Azarenka, both matches in straights sets.

In Charleston, she reached the quarterfinals defeating eighth seed Magda Linette but lost to third seed Daria Kasatkina. In Rome, she moved into the fourth round after this time a walkover from Azarenka, having defeated Magdalena Fręch in the second round. In the French Open, she lost in the second round; afterwards, she began to be coached by her fiancé and longtime boyfriend, Bjorn Fratangelo.

At the Eastbourne International, she reached the final after a nine-year gap at this tournament, defeating compatriot and fifth seed Coco Gauff, her 24th top-10 win. She won her seventh title defeating ninth seed Daria Kasatkina in a match with the second longest tiebreak of the season without losing a set. She continued her good form to reach the quarterfinals at Wimbledon, defeating wildcard entrant Sonay Kartal, qualifier Viktorija Golubic, Marta Kostyuk.and qualifier Mirra Andreeva, before losing to second seed Aryna Sabalenka in the last four.

She reached her first major semifinal since the 2022 Australian Open and third at the US Open defeating, in two consecutive matches, top 10 players Jessica Pegula and reigning Wimbledon champion Markéta Vondroušová. Despite being up a set and a break against [Aryna Sabalenka, she lost her semifinal match in three sets, with tiebreakers in the last two.

Keys finished the year ranked No. 12.

=== 2024: Second WTA 1000 clay semifinal, Strasbourg title ===
After an early season injury, at the Miami Open, she reached the fourth round only for the second time at this tournament, with wins over Diana Shnaider in the second round in a little over an hour, and Wang Xinyu, both in straight sets.

At the Madrid Open, she reached her second WTA 1000 clay semifinal, the first at this tournament, having never been past the third round, defeating Irina-Camelia Begu, 15th seed Liudmila Samsonova, third seed Coco Gauff, and eighth seed Ons Jabeur, coming from 0–6, 0–2 down to win the match. As a result, she returned to No. 16 in the rankings. At the next WTA 1000, the Italian Open, she reached her second straight quarterfinal by defeating Camila Osorio, 12th seed Beatriz Haddad Maia and 28th seed Sorana Cîrstea. She last reached this level at this tournament in 2016.

In Strasbourg, she won her eighth title without dropping a set in the tournament, defeating third seed Danielle Collins in an all-American final. However, she lost in the third round of the French Open to Emma Navarro.

Keys progressed to the fourth round at Wimbledon, where she was forced to retire with an injury at five–all in the third set against eventual finalist Jasmine Paolini. She did not participate in the Olympics and lost in the third round of the US Open to No. 33 seed Elise Mertens in three sets. She would end the year ranked outside the top 20 at No. 21.

=== 2025: Australian Open champion, world No. 5 ===
Keys won the Adelaide International, defeating top seed Jessica Pegula in the final in three sets. It was her ninth career singles title.

Seeded 19th at the Australian Open, she defeated 10th seed Danielle Collins, 6th seed Elena Rybakina, and 28th seed Elina Svitolina to reach the semifinals. As a result, she returned to the top 10 in the singles rankings. In the semifinals, Keys upset world No. 2, Iga Świątek, in three sets, coming from a set down (the first semifinalist to do so since Venus Williams in 2017) and a match point down to reach the second major final of her career, eight years after being the US Open finalist. In the final, Keys defeated world No. 1 Aryna Sabalenka to win her first major title and return to her career-high ranking of world No. 7. She was the first player to win a major after defeating both the world No. 1 and world No. 2 at the Australian Open since Serena Williams in 2005 and at any major since Svetlana Kuznetsova at the 2009 French Open. Her two further wins over top-10 seeds (No. 6 Rybakina and No. 10 Collins) made her the fourth woman (after Evonne Goolagong Cawley at Wimbledon, Mary Pierce at the Australian Open, and Li Na at Roland Garros) to defeat four top-10 seeded opponents en route to a major title. At 29, she became both the oldest first-time women's Australian Open champion and the player with the longest gap between their first two major finals in the Open Era.

On February 24, Keys entered the top 5 for the first time in her career, reaching a career high ranking of No. 5. Keys reached the semifinals at Indian Wells on her return to the tour. She lost to top seed Sabalenka in a rematch of their Australian Open final, snapping her 16 match winning streak.

Keys advanced to the quarterfinals of Madrid, where she lost in three sets to Świątek in a rematch of the previous year's semifinal. Seeded seventh at Roland Garros, Keys reached the quarterfinals for the first time since 2019. She defeated Daria Saville, Katie Boulter, Sofia Kenin (saving match points), and Hailey Baptiste to do so. In the quarterfinals, she won the first set but lost in three to eventual champion Coco Gauff. This ended Keys's major match win streak at 11.

Seeded sixth at Wimbledon, she was upset in the third round by Laura Siegemund. In the fourth round at Montreal, Keys saved match points to defeat 11th seed Karolína Muchová. She lost in the quarterfinals to Tauson. At Cincinnati, Keys lost in the fourth round to Rybakina in three sets. Seeded sixth at the US Open, she was upset by Renata Zarazúa in the first round in a match lasting over three hours.

For the second consecutive year, Keys did not play the Asian swing. Nevertheless, she qualified for the WTA Finals for the first time since 2016. Seeded 7th, Keys lost her first two round robin match to Świątek and Amanda Anisimova. Having already been eliminated from semifinal contention, Keys withdrew from her last round robin match against Rybakina due to illness, being replaced by Ekaterina Alexandrova. Keys finished the year ranked No. 7, her highest year end ranking in her career.

=== 2026: Third Eastbourne title ===
Keys started her 2026 season at the Brisbane International, losing to world No. 1 and eventual champion Aryna Sabalenka in the quarterfinals. The following week, seeking to defend her title at the Adelaide International, she reached the quarterfinals but lost to eighth seed Victoria Mboko. At the Australian Open, where she was also defending champion, Keys was eliminated in the fourth round by sixth seed Jessica Pegula.

Seeded fifth at the Charleston Open in April, she defeated third seed Belinda Bencic en route to the semifinals, at which point her run was ended by Yuliia Starodubtseva. In May, Keys made it through to the final at the WTA 125 Trophée Clarins, but retired due to a thigh injury having won the first set, handing the title to her opponent, Diane Parry. Seeded 19th at the French Open, she defeated ninth seed Victoria Mboko in three sets in third round, before losing her next match to 25th seed Diana Shnaider, also in three sets.

In June at the grass court Berlin Open, Keys reached the quarterfinals, where she lost to third seed Jessica Pegula. The following week at the Eastbourne Open as second seed, she defeated Talia Gibson, Jessica Bouzas Maneiro, seventh seed McCartney Kessler and lucky loser Petra Marčinko to make it into her third final at this tournament. In the championship match Keys made it three wins from three finals, defeating Tatjana Maria in straight sets. Seeded 26th, she continued her good form into Wimbledon, overcoming sixth seed Amanda Anisimova on her way to the fourth round, at which point she lost to ninth seed Linda Nosková.

Keys began the North American hard court swing of the year at the Canadian Open, where she lost to 10th seed Marta Kostyuk in the third round. She then reached the quarterfinals at the Cincinnati Open, but saw her run halted by Sara Bejlek. Seeded 22nd at the US Open, Keys saved five match points before coming through her second round match against Anna Bondár in a deciding 10 point tiebreak. In the third round she let slip a 5–0 third set lead, including failing to convert a match point, losing seven games in a row as she was defeated by qualifier Qinwen Zheng. Keys subsequently withdrew from the China Open and Wuhan Open for personal reasons.

== Rivalries ==
=== Keys vs. Williams sisters ===
Keys regarded Venus and Serena Williams as two of her childhood idols. She has also frequently been labeled as a potential successor to the Williams sisters to lead American women's tennis. Keys never defeated Serena in three attempts but she does have a 3–2 record against Venus.

Keys first played Venus in the quarterfinals of the 2013 Charleston Open, where Venus won a tight match against an 18-year-old Keys. Their next encounter occurred in Keys's breakthrough tournament, the 2015 Australian Open. Keys won their quarterfinal match in three sets, overcoming a lower back injury in the second set. Venus won their next match later in the year at the WTA Elite Trophy, where she won the title. Keys has won their most recent two encounters at the 2016 Canadian Open and the 2019 Cincinnati Open.

Keys's first match against Serena came right after her first victory over Venus at the 2015 Australian Open. Serena was able to end Keys's run in the semifinals but offered high praise for her opponent. At the US Open later that year, she beat Keys at a major tournament yet again. Their most recent meeting took place in the final of the Italian Open, the first Premier 5 final of Keys's career. Keys entered the match as an underdog, given that Serena had a 15 match win streak against other Americans, and had not lost to another American in a final since Wimbledon in 2008 against her sister. Serena preserved both of those streaks with a straight sets win.

=== Keys vs. Stephens and Vandeweghe ===
Keys is close friends with Sloane Stephens and CoCo Vandeweghe, creating a friendly rivalry between the three of them. They have also been grouped together as the leaders of the next generation of American tennis. In particular with Stephens, Keys has said, "Sloane and I, since we were 12 and 14, have constantly been compared to each other." All three have been ranked in the top 10 by the WTA. Keys is 2–4 against Stephens, but is 3–0 against Vandeweghe.

Keys has struggled against Stephens, often hitting more unforced errors than usual in their matches. These miscues have resulted from Stephens being able to counteract Keys's powerful groundstrokes while also supplying power to her own shots. Keys and Stephens first played in the first round at the 2015 Miami Open, which Stephens won in straight sets. They would not meet again until the 2017 US Open final in which both players were looking for their first career major singles title. Stephens defeated Keys in straight sets, which included taking the final eight games of the match. Their next meeting also came in the latter stages of a major, in the semifinals of the 2018 French Open, where they were both trying to reach their second major final. Stephens again won in straight sets. Keys finally recorded her first victory against Stephens in the quarterfinals at the 2019 Volvo Car Open, winning in three sets on the way to her first career clay-court title.

Keys and Vandeweghe have similar playing styles, both using their height to generate power and hit fast serves. They had never met until the summer of 2017, when they faced off three times in a little more than a month. In their first meeting, Keys won the final at the Stanford Classic in straight sets to claim her third career title. They were then drawn against each other in the first round of the Cincinnati Open, the very next match for both players. Keys won again, this time in three sets. They next met in the semifinals of the US Open where they were both trying to reach their first career major singles final. Keys easily defeated Vandeweghe in straight sets, only losing three games.

=== Keys vs. Kerber and Halep ===
Out of all the players who have been ranked world No. 1, Keys has most frequently faced off against Angelique Kerber and Simona Halep. Both Kerber and Halep have been effective at using their counter-punching style to neutralize Keys's power. As a result, she does not have a good record against either of them, going 2–8 against Kerber and 2–5 against Halep. Many of these encounters have taken place in important tournaments. Both Kerber and Halep defeated Keys in the round robin stage of the 2016 WTA Finals to prevent her from advancing to the semifinals.

Keys' first victory over Kerber came in the final of the 2014 Eastbourne International to give Keys her first ever WTA title. This was their third meeting. Since this victory, Keys notably lost to Kerber in the final of the 2015 Charleston Open, the semifinals at the 2016 Rio Olympics, and the quarterfinals at the 2018 Australian Open. In particular, Keys would have won a medal had she defeated Kerber at the Olympics but ended up finishing in fourth place just off the podium. She snapped her five-match losing streak to Kerber in 2018 with a come-from-behind three-set win in the third round of the Cincinnati Open.

Keys won her first-ever meeting with Halep at the 2014 Sydney International, losing only five games after previously being on verge of demolishing Halep at 6–1, 5–0. Following this match, she lost her next five matches against Halep, including the fourth round at Wimbledon and the final of the Canadian Open, both of which were contested in 2016. Keys ended her losing streak to Halep in the third round of the 2019 Cincinnati Open, winning in three sets en route to winning her first Premier 5 title.

=== Keys vs. Muguruza and Osaka ===
By contrast with her head-to-head record against counter-punchers Kerber and Halep, she led a 4–1 record against Garbiñe Muguruza and 3–1 against Naomi Osaka. Both have won multiple majors and both are former world No. 1's, but lost to Keys' groundstrokes in most of their matches.

Keys and Muguruza played a lot of competitive matches, as there was at least one tie-break in all matches but one. Nevertheless, it was Keys who prevailed in most of those matches. Keys won in straight sets their most important meeting at semifinals of premier 5 tournament at 2016 Italian Open, and also another semifinals at 2017 Bank of the West Classic, which was their fastest match so far, as Keys lost only five games. The latter was a significant win for Keys as Muguruza was playing her first tournament since winning Wimbledon. Muguruza won the next match at 2017 Cincinnati Open only two weeks later, after Keys served for the match and missed two match points. Two years later at the same tournament, Keys won after a big three-set battle and went on to win the title.

First match against Osaka at the 2016 US Open came when Osaka was still a teenager, while two-years-older Keys was more experienced having already reached Major semifinals and top 10. In the end, experience turned out to be a key for the win, as Madison found herself down 1–5 in third set, but won the next five games and eventually won the tie-break to progress to the fourth round. Keys went on to win much easier in straight sets their next two matches at 2017 BNP Paribas Open and 2018 French Open, even though in the latter Osaka was in a little bit better form at the time and also recent Indian Wells champion. First win for Osaka eventually came in the most important match later that year at 2018 US Open, as it was the semifinal stage of the Major. This time it was Osaka who won convincingly, losing six games and later admitting that in previous matches she was 'the one that's been trying to go for shots' while 'today I was just trying to be more patient and maybe go for them when I had the opportunity'.

== Playing style ==
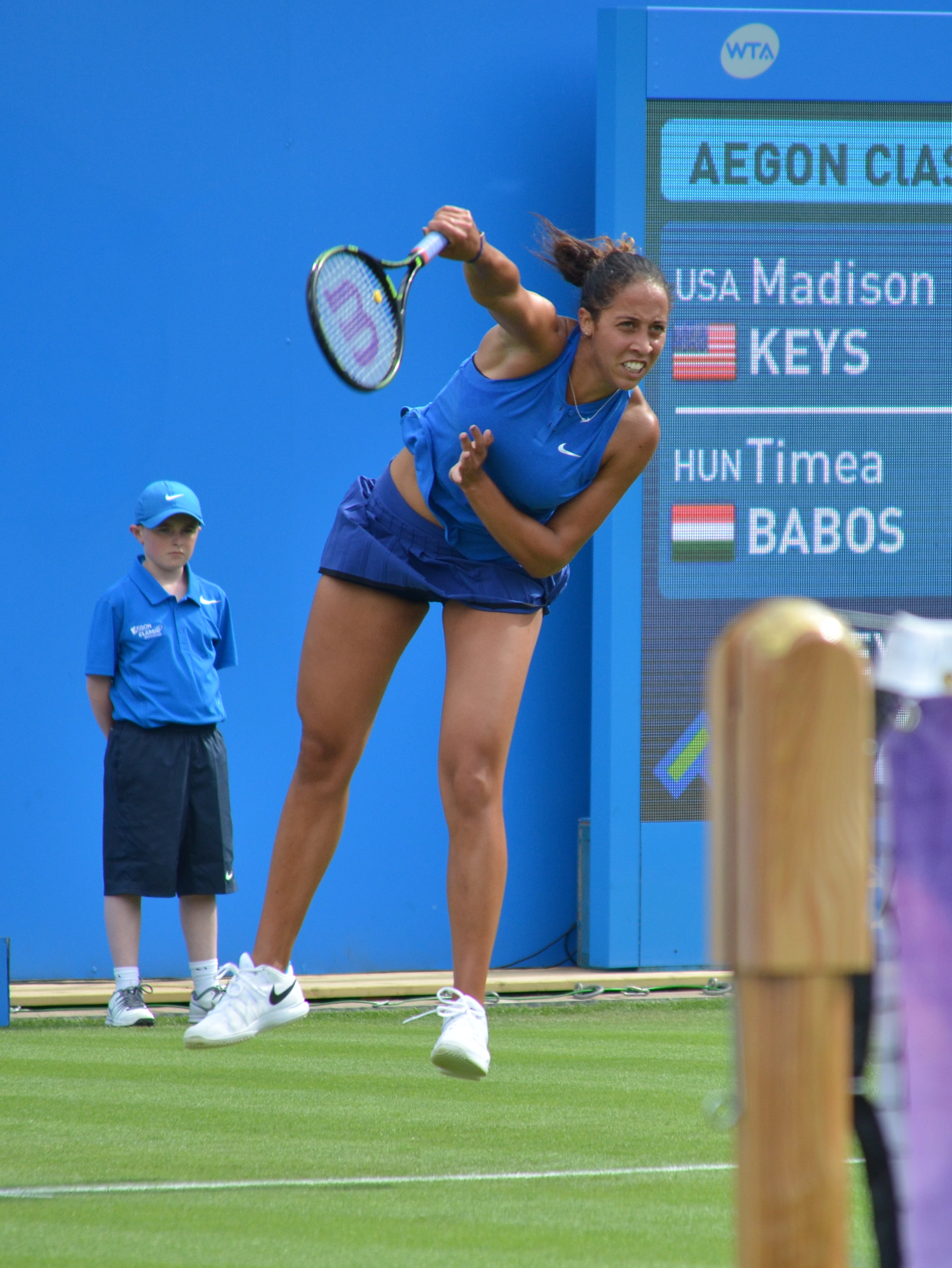
Keys serving

Keys has described her own game as "I have a pretty good serve and a pretty good forehand, but what people notice the most is how hard I can hit the ball and how much power is behind my shots." She has been listed at 5' 10" since she was 14 years old, which helped her play in pro events from a young age. She has used her tall frame to develop a style of play around hitting big serves and powerful groundstrokes on both the forehand and backhand sides. Keys's junior coach Chris Evert compared her level of power at 18 years old to that of Serena Williams, saying "I can almost say she almost matches Serena [Williams'] serve as far as power. Out of all the players out there, she comes the closest to Serena's serve. The power off both sides is tremendous for someone that young." Keys is particularly known for hitting strong forehand groundstrokes. Former world No. 1 Karolína Plíšková, who also has an elite forehand, and 2017 US Open champion Sloane Stephens have both said that Keys has the best forehand in the game.

Keys is an aggressive baseliner. She does not go to the net too often, instead relying on her power to hit forehand and backhand winners to end points. The Aggression Score metric, which measures a player's aggression based on how quickly they finish points, rated Keys among the top 10% of all players. Keys's biggest weakness is her inability to control her power at times. Her match losses are often due to her opponents provoking her into hitting too many unforced errors while she is aiming for winners.

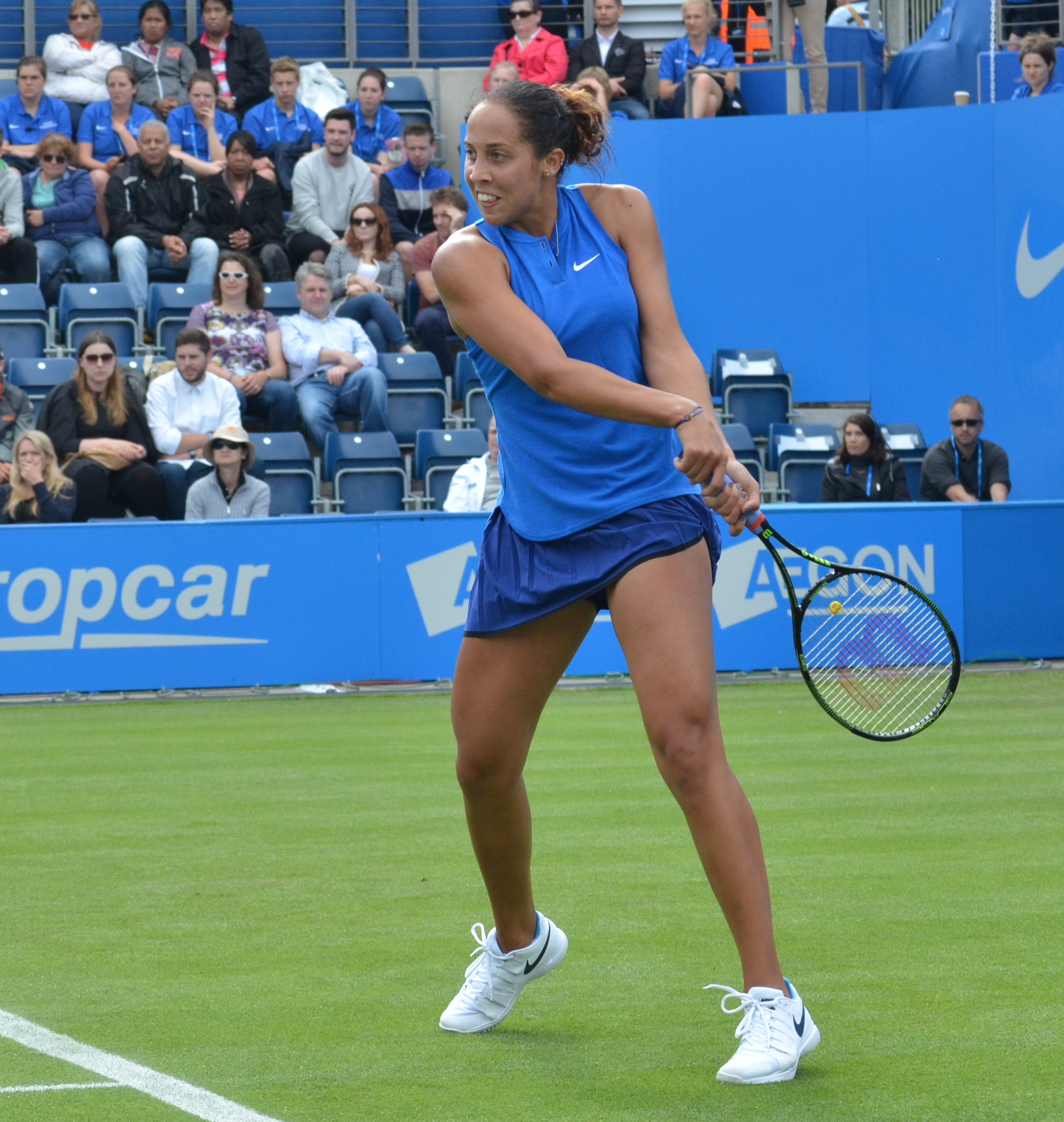
Keys preparing to hit a backhand

Although Keys prefers playing on hardcourts, where she won her first major and Premier 5 title, she has had success on all three main surfaces used on tour. Three out of her ten career titles have come on grass courts. Her least favorite surface is clay, which is typically regarded as too slow to suit players like Keys whose style revolves around hitting with power. Nonetheless, she has won one title on clay at the 2019 Charleston Open, reached one Premier 5 final on clay, and also made it to the semifinals at the French Open.

Keys uses her strong serve to dominate her service games. In 2016, she finished third in percentage of points won on serve behind only Serena Williams and Victoria Azarenka, among all players with at least ten tour-level matches. That same year, she also hit the third-most aces with 300, trailing Serena who had 324 and Plíšková who led the tour with 530. Keys could serve at more than 100 miles per hour (160 km/h) when she was 14, and was clocked at up to 126 miles per hour (203 km/h) on the road to her first WTA Tour title in 2014. Although that serve is not recognized because there was no official serve speed data at the tournament, the WTA has recorded her serving at 124 miles per hour (200 km/h) at the US Open, which was good for the fifth fastest serve in 2015.

On multiple occasions, Keys has been recorded hitting groundstrokes at speeds that are comparable to, if not faster than the top men's tennis players. At the 2014 French Open, Keys had the fastest average groundstroke speed of any player at 78.9 miles per hour (127.0 km/h). For comparison, Novak Djokovic had the fastest groundstrokes on the men's side with an average speed of 77.1 miles per hour (124.1 km/h). The Game Insight Group analyzed Australian Open data over a five-year period from 2012 to 2016 and found that Keys had the second-fastest average forehand and backhand speeds of all players. Her 78.9 miles per hour (127.0 km/h) forehands trailed only Tomáš Berdych, and her 72.8 miles per hour (117.2 km/h) backhands trailed only Li Na. Out of just her fastest 1% of shots, Keys hit an average forehand at 97.1 miles per hour (156.3 km/h), which was stronger than Lleyton Hewitt and close to David Ferrer. Her fastest backhands had an average of 90.0 miles per hour (144.8 km/h), which was faster than that of Bernard Tomic and close to Nick Kyrgios, both of whom have a reputation for being able to hit powerful groundstrokes.

== Coaches ==
When Keys was at the Evert Tennis Academy, she was primarily coached by John Evert. She also worked with his sister Chris Evert, a member of the International Tennis Hall of Fame. In 2011 after six years at the academy, Keys switched coaches to Adam Peterson, who was assigned to work with her through the USTA. Peterson is better known as a long time coach of Lindsay Davenport, who would also later coach Keys. In her early pro career, Keys also worked with two other USTA coaches, Juan Todero and Jay Gooding, who helped her break into the top 50 of the WTA rankings.

Before the start of the 2015 season, Davenport and her husband Jon Leach joined Keys's coaching team. During this year, Keys also worked with doubles legend Lisa Raymond. Despite a breakthrough season, Keys left all three at the end of the year in search of a coach who would be available for a more full-time role. In the first half of 2016, Keys hired Jesse Levine to coach her. During this period, she also worked with Mats Wilander for about a week, which amounted to little. Near the start of the clay court season, Keys replaced Levine with Thomas Högstedt. With this partnership, Keys had a fantastic second half of the year that culminated in her debut at the WTA Finals. Nonetheless, Keys split with Högstedt after the season due to a "personality conflict." In spite of the split, Keys did believe that Högstedt helped her game a lot.

Keys reunited with Davenport at the beginning of 2017. Midway through the year, she also started to work with Dieter Kindlmann. Although Keys struggled early in the season in part due to her comeback from wrist surgery, Davenport helped lead Keys to a third title and her first major final at the US Open later in the year. Keys ended her partnership with Kindlmann in May 2018, with the two having worked together for about a year. Keys briefly worked with Australian David Taylor starting in June, but decided to play without a primary coach for most of the latter half of the season, including at the US Open. After a short stint with Jim Madrigal in early 2019, she went back to her former coach Juan Todero and won her first clay court title in their first tournament since his return.

She was coached by former ATP professional tennis player Georgi Rumenov Payakov since January 2022. As of June 2023 she is coached by her then-fiancé (now husband) and former professional tennis player Bjorn Fratangelo.

== Sponsors ==
Keys has been sponsored by Nike since she was 14 years old, who provide her with clothing and shoes. Wilson was Keys's racket sponsor until 2024. She helped launch the Wilson Ultra line of rackets in the middle of 2017 and specifically used the Ultra Tour model.

As for the Australian Open 2025, she changed her racket model to Yonex Ezone, with which she won the first major title in her career.

Keys is the first American ambassador for the French water company, Evian, which Maria Sharapova also endorses. In 2018, Keys partnered with the contact lens brand Acuvue. She has also endorsed Orangetheory Fitness, a company based in Boca Raton where Keys has been a long-time resident.

In June 2025, Keys was named the first athlete brand ambassador for fine-jewelry company Brilliant Earth in August.

== Personal life ==
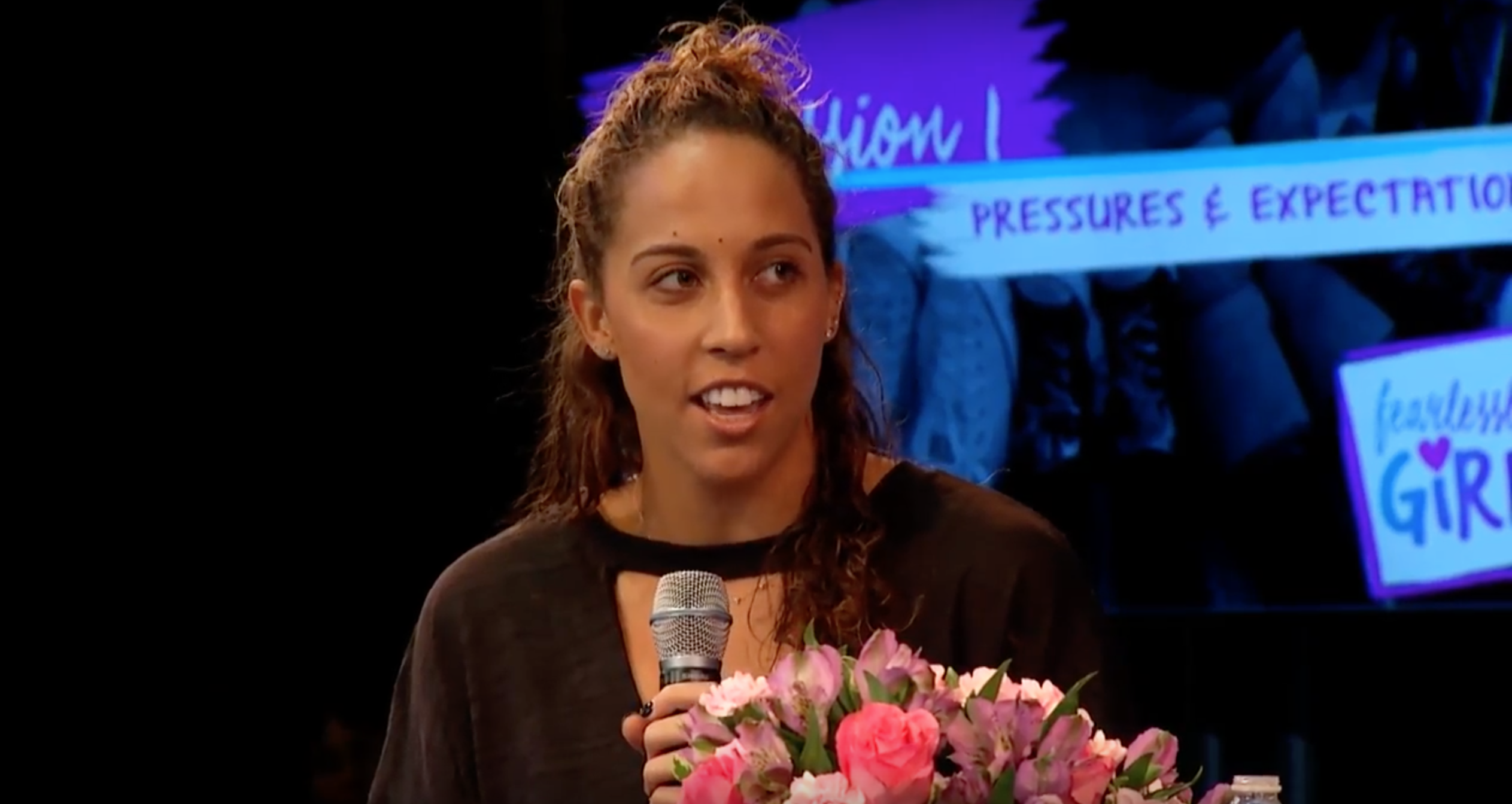
Keys at a Fearlessly Girl summit

Keys has said that she looks up to Roger Federer because of his class and his positive attitude on the court. Venus and Serena Williams were also two of her favorite players growing up. Although she first liked Venus for her tennis dresses, Keys also later admired Serena for her efforts in the fight to bridge the prize money gap between men and women in tennis. She was also a big fan of her future coach Lindsay Davenport as well as Kim Clijsters.

Keys is very close friends with Sloane Stephens and CoCo Vandeweghe. She hugged Stephens after losing the 2017 US Open final and jumped into Vandeweghe's lap after beating her in the 2017 Stanford Classic final.

Keys is biracial, as her mother is white and her father is African American. On her race, she said in 2015: "I don't really identify myself as white or African American. I'm just me. I'm Madison."

Keys is an ambassador for Fearlessly Girl, an organization dedicated to fighting bullying and cyber-bullying, with a focus on reaching out to high school girls. She co-hosted the first summit for the group with founder Kate Whitfield in her hometown of Rock Island, Illinois, in 2016. In February 2020, Keys relaunched Fearlessly Girl into a nonprofit organization called Kindness Wins. In its mission statement, the organization is described as "a platform for kindness, with special emphasis on kindness to self, kindness to youth and kindness to others in times of struggle."

In November 2024, Keys married Bjorn Fratangelo, a former ATP top 100 player whom she had been dating since 2017.

== Career statistics ==
=== Grand Slam performance timelines ===
Key
W	F	SF	QF	#R	RR	Q#	DNQ	A	NH

(W) winner; (F) finalist; (SF) semifinalist; (QF) quarterfinalist; (#R) rounds 4, 3, 2, 1; (RR) round-robin stage; (Q#) qualification round; (DNQ) did not qualify; (A) absent; (NH) not held; (SR) strike rate (events won / competed); (W–L) win–loss record.
To avoid confusion and double counting, these charts are updated at the conclusion of a tournament or when the player's participation has ended.

==== Singles ====
Tournament	2009	2010	2011	2012	2013	2014	2015	2016	2017	2018	2019	2020	2021	2022	2023	2024	2025	2026	SR	W–L	Win %
Australian Open	A	A	A	1R	3R	2R	SF	4R	A	QF	4R	3R	A	SF	3R	A	W	4R	1 / 12	37–11	77%
French Open	A	A	A	A	2R	1R	3R	4R	2R	SF	QF	1R	3R	4R	2R	3R	QF	4R	0 / 14	31–14	69%
Wimbledon	A	A	A	Q2	3R	3R	QF	4R	2R	3R	2R	NH	4R	A	QF	4R	3R	4R	0 / 12	30–12	71%
US Open	A	Q1	2R	Q2	1R	2R	4R	4R	F	SF	4R	3R	1R	3R	SF	3R	1R	3R	0 / 15	35–15	70%
Win–loss	0–0	0–0	1–1	0–1	5–4	4–4	14–4	12–4	8–3	16–4	11–4	4–3	5–3	10–3	12–4	7–3	13–3	11–4	1 / 51	133–52	72%

==== Doubles ====
Tournament	2011	2012	2013	2014	2015	2016	..	2022	2023	SR	W–L	Win %
Australian Open	A	A	A	3R	1R	2R	A	A	A	0 / 3	3–3	50%
French Open	A	A	1R	3R	A	A	A	SF	A	0 / 3	5–3	63%
Wimbledon	A	A	1R	2R	1R	1R	A	A	A	0 / 4	1–4	20%
US Open	1R	2R	A	A	1R	A	A	A	A	0 / 3	1–3	25%
Win–loss	0–1	1–1	0–2	4–3	0–3	1–2	0–0	4–1	0–0	0 / 13	10–13	43%

Note: Keys received a walkover in the second round of the 2014 French Open, which does not officially count as a win.

=== Grand Slam tournament finals ===
==== Singles: 2 (1 title, 1 runner-up) ====
Result	Year	Tournament	Surface	Opponent	Score
Loss	2017	US Open	Hard	(United States) Sloane Stephens	3–6, 0–6
Win	2025	Australian Open	Hard	Aryna Sabalenka	6–3, 2–6, 7–5
