= List of Serbia Billie Jean King Cup team representatives =

This is a list of tennis players who have represented the Serbia Billie Jean King Cup team in an official Billie Jean King Cup match. Also included are those who played for the Yugoslavia Fed Cup team or the Serbia and Montenegro Fed Cup team. Serbia are considered a direct successor of both those teams and share their historical records. The player's win–loss record is their combined total, so may include ties played for Serbia while they were known as their previous names. For players who have competed for other nations, only matches played under the Serbian or its previous team flags are included. Players are ordered by the team they debuted for.

== Key ==
Lists are correct as of 11 April 2026, after the tie against the France.

== Serbia (2007–present) ==
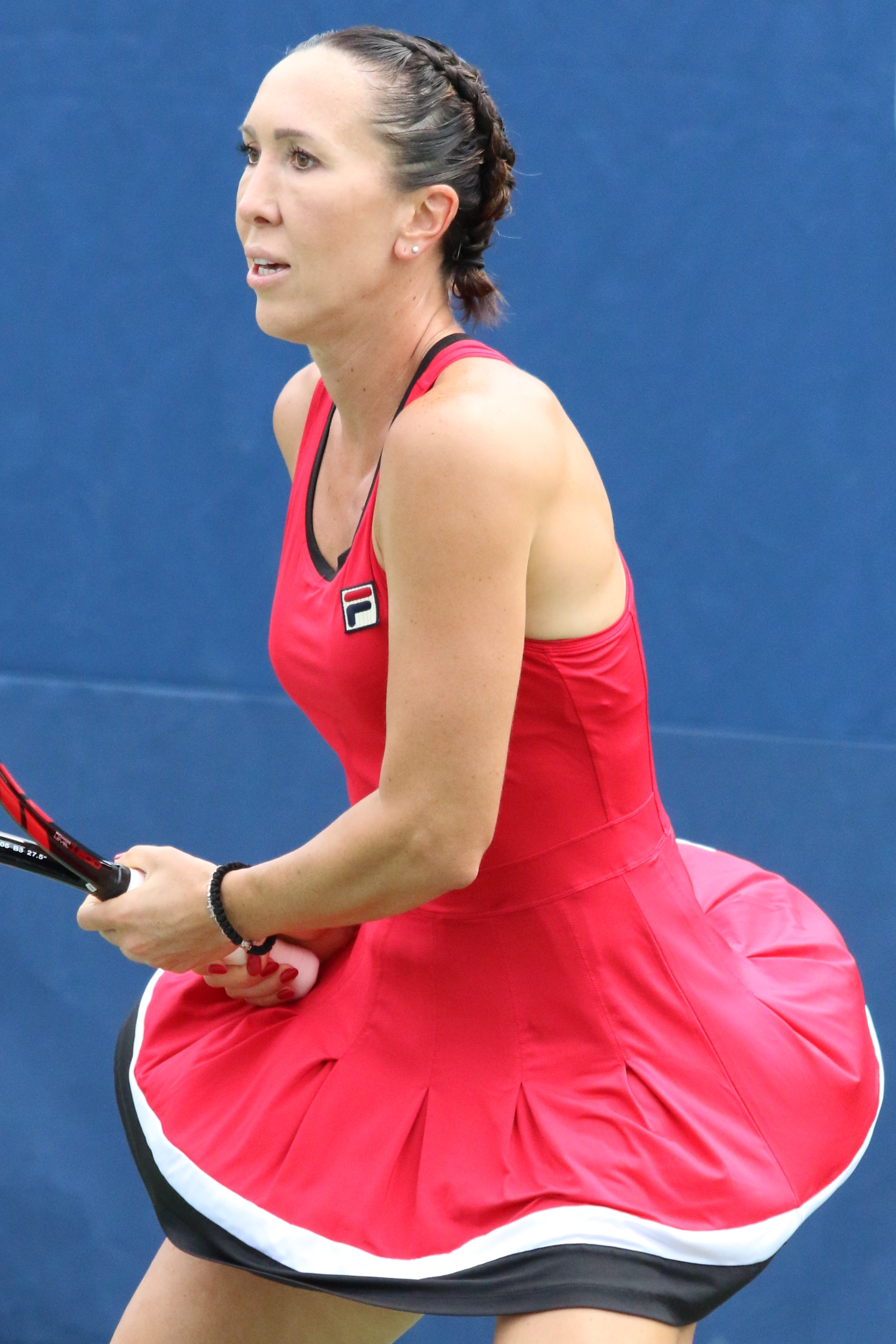
Jelena Janković

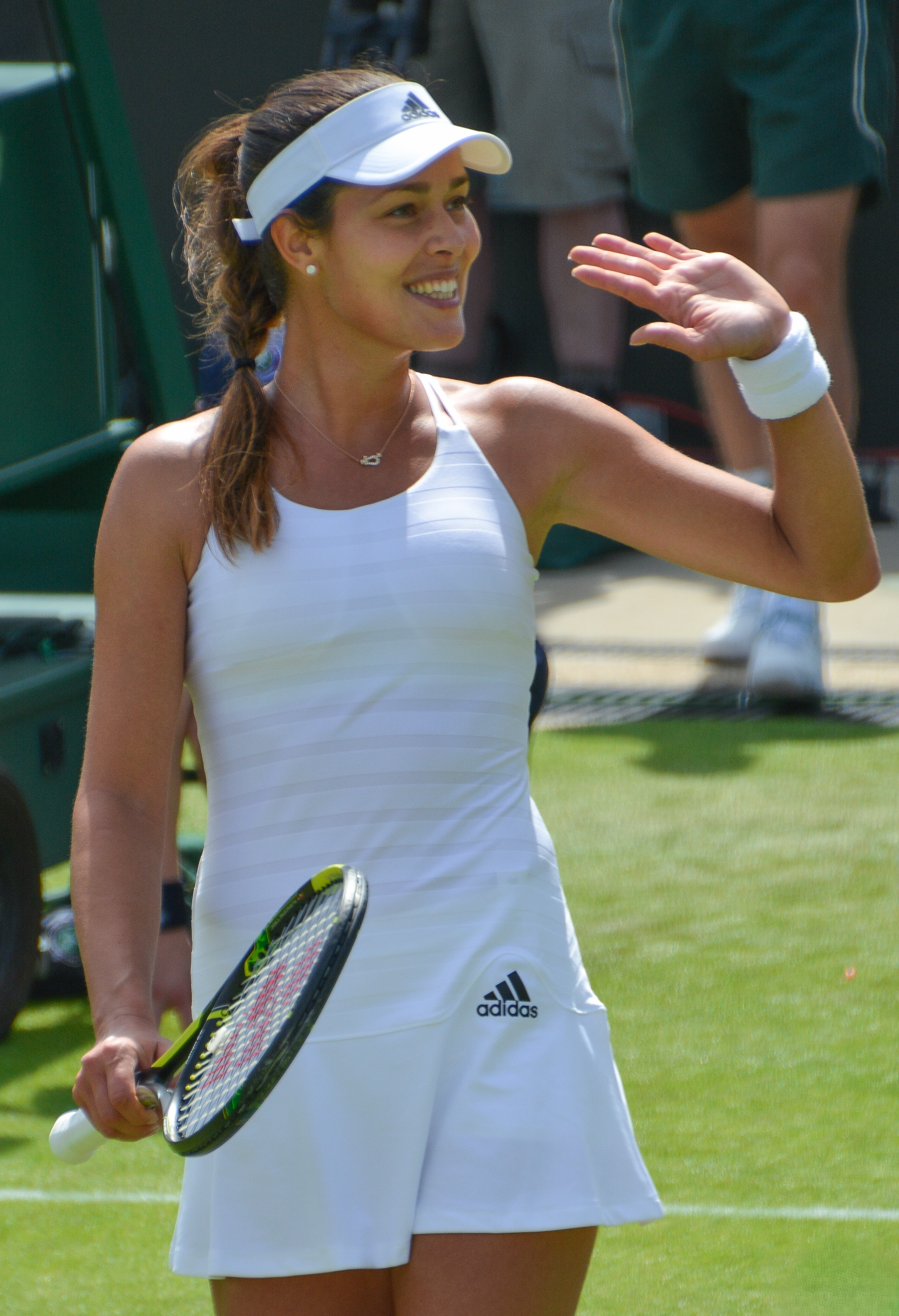
Ana Ivanovic

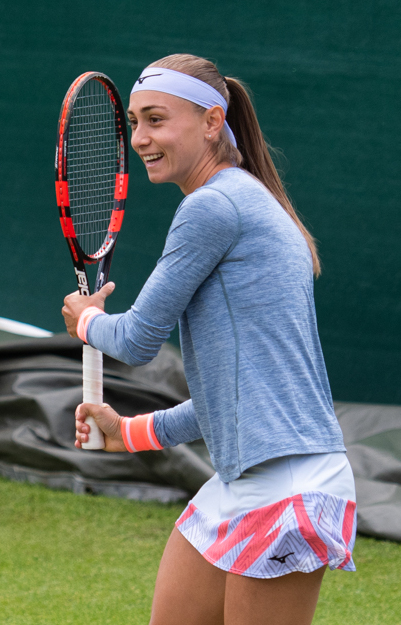
Aleksandra Krunić

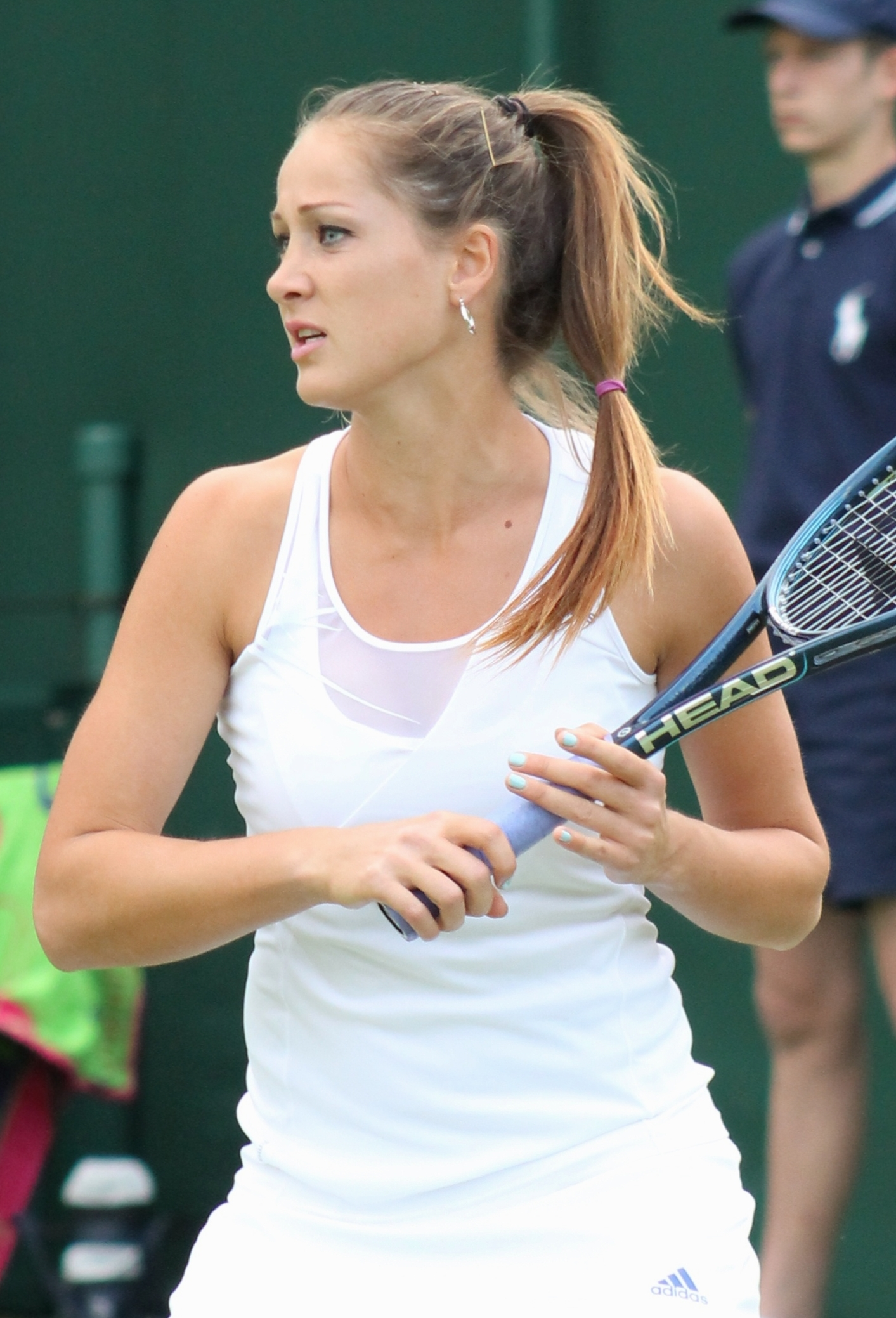
Bojana Jovanovski Petrović

Player	W–L (Total)	W–L (Singles)	W–L (Doubles)	Ties	Debut
Luna Vujović	0–1	0–0	0–1	1	2025
Teodora Kostović	4–3	4–2	0–1	6	2025
Natalija Senić	3–5	2–0	1–5	6	2024
Anja Stanković	0–3	0–0	0–3	3	2024
Mia Ristić	10–9	10–6	0–3	17	2023
Lola Radivojević	10–14	8–10	2–4	20	2022
Natalija Stevanović	0–1	0–1	0–0	1	2022
Elena Milovanović	1–4	0–1	1–3	4	2022
Katarina Kozarov	3–5	0–0	3–5	8	2022
Katarina Jokić	0–1	0–0	0–1	1	2022
Olga Danilović	12–8	7–3	5–5	14	2018
Dejana Radanović	4–6	2–3	2–3	7	2017
Bojana Marinković	0–3	0–0	0–3	3	2017
Ivana Jorović	14–10	9–5	5–5	15	2015
Nina Stojanović	11–12	2–8	9–4	15	2014
Jovana Jović	2–3	0–2	2–1	3	2014
Vesna Dolonc	2–4	1–3	1–1	3	2013
Aleksandra Krunić	29–17	15–8	14–9	32	2011
Bojana Jovanovski Petrović	6–11	4–9	2–2	8	2010
Teodora Mircic	0–3	0–1	0–2	2	2008
Vojislava Lukić	2–2	1–2	1–0	3	2007

== Serbia & Montenegro (1995–2006) ==
Player	W–L (Total)	W–L (Singles)	W–L (Doubles)	Ties	Debut
Danica Krstajić (Note: Krstajić represented Serbia and Montenegro from 2003 to 2006, then represented Montenegro from 2006 to 2012.)	4–1	1–0	3–1	4	2006
Ana Ivanovic	20–9	17–7	3–2	17	2006
Ana Jovanovic	3–6	3–2	0–4	7	2005
Jelena Dokić (Note: Dokić represented Australia from 1998 to 2000, debuting in Fed Cup in 1998. She later competed for FR Yugoslavia/Serbia and Montenegro from 2001, with her debut for them in 2004, and returned to Australia from 2006 to 2012.)	2–1	2–1	0–0	3	2004
Ana Timotić	9–10	3–6	6–4	15	2004
Daniela Berček	1–1	0–0	1–1	2	2002
Jelena Janković	34–16	27–11	7–5	31	2001
Borka Majstorović	0–3	0–3	0–0	3	1999
Branka Bojović	0–3	0–0	0–3	3	1999
Sanja Jukić	0–1	0–0	0–1	1	1998
Tatjana Ječmenica	1–1	0–1	1–0	2	1998
Ljiljana Nanušević	6–0	1–0	5–0	5	1997
Sandra Naćuk	8–9	7–5	1–4	12	1996
Dragana Zarić	33–19	18–8	15–11	37	1995
Katarina Mišić	15–8	6–5	9–3	18	1995
Dragana Ilić	8–2	1–0	7–2	9	1995

== SFR Yugoslavia (1969–1992) ==
Player	W–L (Total)	W–L (Singles)	W–L (Doubles)	Ties	Debut
Branislava Ivanovic	6–6	5–4	1–2	9	1992
Ljudmila Pavlov	4–8	2–5	2–3	7	1991
Gorana Matić (Note: Matić represented Yugoslavia from 1988 to 1992, and later represented Croatia from 1992 to 1994.)	4–3	3–1	1–2	4	1990
Nadin Ercegović (Note: Ercegović represented Yugoslavia from 1988 to 1992, and later represented Croatia from 1992 to 1996.)	5–12	4–9	1–3	13	1989
Tanja Cerne	0–4	0–3	0–1	3	1988
Karmen Škulj	4–7	3–5	1–2	8	1986
Aila Winkler	4–1	0–0	4–1	5	1985
Sabrina Goleš	30–13	15–8	15–5	24	1981
Renata Šašak	13–12	5–5	8–7	15	1979
Lea Degen	0–2	0–1	0–1	1	1979
Nenni Delmestre	2–2	1–1	1–1	2	1978
Judita Papišta	0–1	0–0	0–1	1	1976
Dora Alavantić	1–4	1–2	0–2	3	1975
Mima Jaušovec	19–18	10–8	9–10	24	1973
Jelena Genčić	0–4	0–2	0–2	2	1973
Alenka Pipan	0–1	0–0	0–1	1	1970
Irena Škulj	0–4	0–2	0–2	2	1969
Biljana Kostić	0–2	0–2	0–0	2	1969
Lena Dvorink	0–1	0–0	0–1	1	1969

== Heart Award ==
The following players have received the Billie Jean King Cup Heart Award, an initiative by the International Tennis Federation, for representing their country with distinction, showing exceptional courage on court, and demonstrating outstanding commitment to their team during the Billie Jean King Cup.

- 2018: Europe/Africa Zone Group I: Olga Danilović
- 2012: World Group semifinals: Jelena Janković (2/2)
- 2011: World Group / World Group II first round: Bojana Jovanovski Petrović
- 2010: World Group / World Group II first round: Jelena Janković (1/2)
