= 2022 GB Pro-Series Glasgow =

Tennis tournament

- Date: 17–23 October 2022
- Edition: 29th
- Category: ITF Women's World Tennis Tour
- Prize money: $60,000
- Surface: Hard / Indoor
- Location: Glasgow, United Kingdom

Champions

Singles
- (United Kingdom) Yuriko Miyazaki

Doubles
- (United Kingdom) Freya Christie / (United Kingdom) Ali Collins
← 2022 ·	GB Pro-Series Glasgow	· 2023 →

The 2022 GB Pro-Series Glasgow was a professional tennis tournament played on indoor hard courts. It was the twenty-ninth edition of the tournament which was part of the 2022 ITF Women's World Tennis Tour. It took place in Glasgow, United Kingdom between 17 and 23 October 2022.

== Champions ==
=== Singles ===
- (United Kingdom) Yuriko Miyazaki def. (United Kingdom) Heather Watson, 5–7, 7–6^{(7–5)}, 6–2

=== Doubles ===
- (United Kingdom) Freya Christie / (United Kingdom) Ali Collins def. (Spain) Irene Burillo Escorihuela / (Spain) Andrea Lázaro García, 6–4, 6–1

== Singles main draw entrants ==
=== Seeds ===
Country	Player	Rank^{1}	Seed
GBR	Katie Swan	118	1
GBR	Katie Boulter	137	2
GBR	Jodie Burrage	139	3
GBR	Heather Watson	145	4
ESP	Aliona Bolsova	163	5
UZB	Nigina Abduraimova	187	6
NED	Lesley Pattinama Kerkhove	188	7
BIH	Nefisa Berberović	228	8

- ^{1} Rankings are as of 10 October 2022.

=== Other entrants ===
The following players received wildcards into the singles main draw:

- (United Kingdom) Amarni Banks
- (United Kingdom) Anna Brogan
- (United Kingdom) Jasmine Conway
- (United Kingdom) Ella McDonald

The following player received entry into the singles main draw using a protected ranking:

- (United Kingdom) Maia Lumsden

The following players received entry from the qualifying draw:

- (United Kingdom) Emily Appleton
- (France) Julie Belgraver
- (Malta) Francesca Curmi
- (Switzerland) Fiona Ganz
- (Algeria) Inès Ibbou
- (United Kingdom) Eliz Maloney
- (United Kingdom) Talia Neilson Gatenby
- (Austria) Tamira Paszek

The following player received entry as a lucky loser:

- (Estonia) Maileen Nuudi
