= Berček =

Berček is a Serbo-Croatian surname. Notable people with the surname include:

- Aleksandar Berček (born 1950), Serbian actor
- Daniela Berček (born 1984), Serbian tennis player
