= Sarah Stone (tennis) =

Australian tennis player

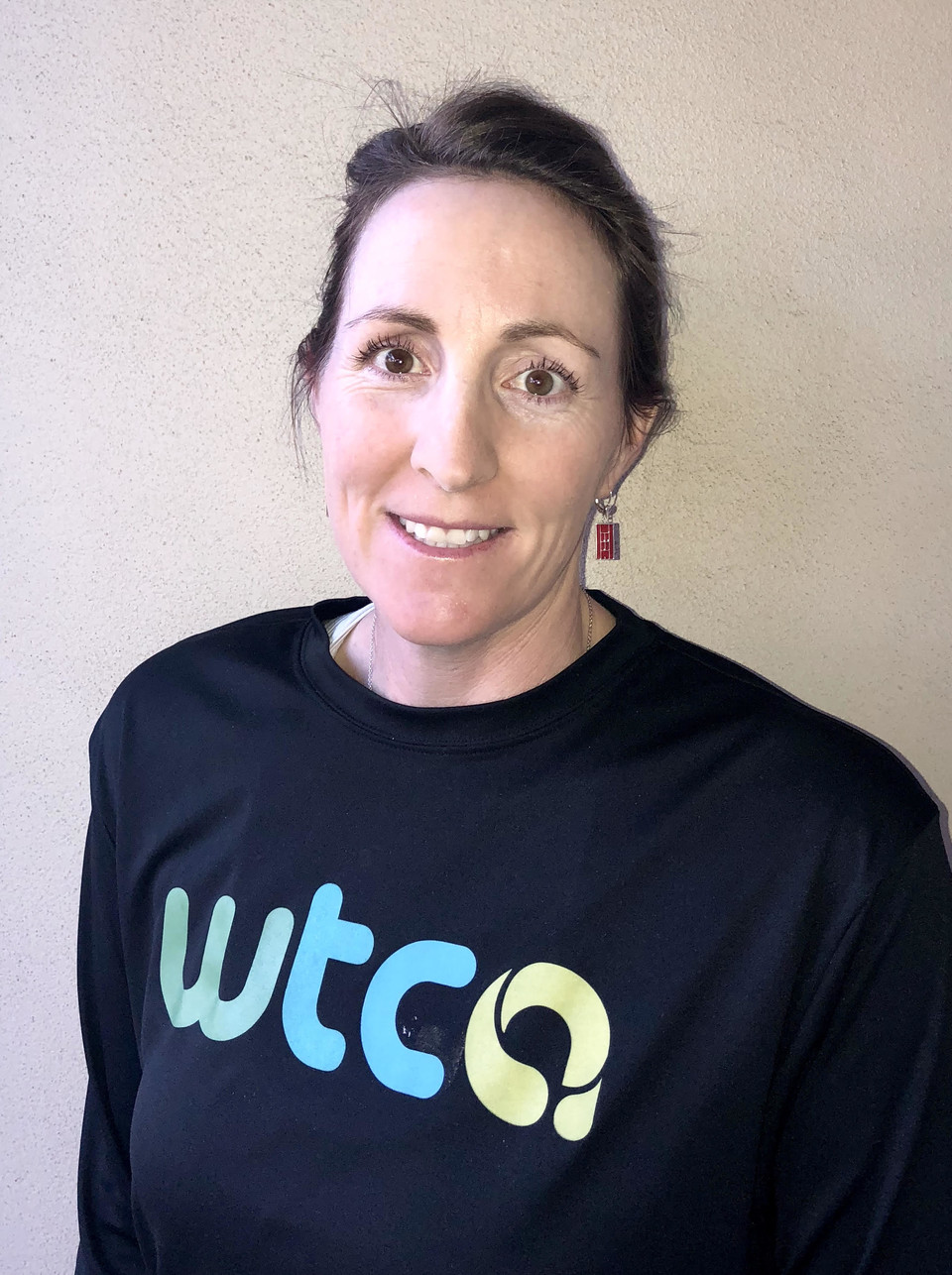
- Full name: Sarah Jane Stone
- Country (sports): Australia
- Born: 23 March 1982 (age 44) Melbourne, Australia
- Height: 181 cm (5 ft 11 in)
- Plays: Right-handed
- Prize money: $27,772

Singles
- Highest ranking: No. 600 (24 February 2003)

Doubles
- Career titles: 0 WTA, 11 ITF
- Highest ranking: No. 131 (14 July 2003)

Grand Slam doubles results
- Australian Open: 1R (2003)
- Wimbledon: 1R (2003)

Sarah Jane Stone (born 23 March 1982) is a former professional tennis player from Australia.

== Biography ==
A doubles specialist from Melbourne, Stone competed on the professional tour in the early 2000s before her career was cut short due to a right foot and back injury.

Stone won eleven ITF doubles titles during her career, eight of which came in the 2002 season. She excelled as a doubles player on the ITF Junior Circuit where she reached the world No. 8 ranking.

Her best result on the WTA Tour was a quarterfinal appearance, partnering Samantha Stosur at the 2002 Tasmanian International.

In 2003, she featured in the main draw of the women's doubles at both the Australian Open and Wimbledon. She played in the Australian Open as a wildcard pairing with Samantha Stosur, then at Wimbledon, she and Nicole Sewell played as successful qualifiers, after defeating Dinara Safina and Maria Elena Camarin.

Between 2006 and 2008 Stone worked with WTA Tour players Anastasia Rodionova, Romina Oprandi, Vasilisa Bardina and Christina Wheeler.

Now based in the United States, she coaches American player Alexa Glatch and Serbian world No. 39 Aleksandra Krunić. Stone began working with Krunic's team at Indian Wells in 2018. Under Stone's coaching tutelage Krunić won her first WTA Tour title at 's Hertogenbosch defeating Coco Vandeweghe and Kirsten Flipkens along the way. As a result, Krunić reached a career-high WTA ranking of 39.

She was previously the coach of her former doubles partner Samantha Stosur for three years during which time Stosur reached the world No. 1 doubles ranking and won three Grand Slam doubles titles.

In 2015, Stone founded the Women's Tennis Coaching Association (WTCA), and is the CEO of the 501 (C3) organization. Stone is the chairperson of the women's tennis coaching board of the Professional Tennis Registry.

She is a WTA gold level coach and a coaching consultant to the SBW Tennis Academy in Brentwood Los Angeles.

== ITF Circuit finals ==
=== Doubles: 21 (11-10) ===
Legend
$100,000 tournaments
$75,000 tournaments
$50,000 tournaments
$25,000 tournaments
$10,000 tournaments

Outcome	No.	Date	Tournament	Surface	Partner	Opponents	Score
Winner	1.	19 March 2001	Wodonga, Australia	Grass	(Australia) Kristen van Elden	(Australia) Beti Sekulovski (Australia) Nicole Sewell	3–6, 7–6^{(4)}, 6–4
Winner	2.	16 July 2001	Frinton, Great Britain	Grass	(Australia) Beti Sekulovski	(Republic of Ireland) Yvonne Doyle (Republic of Ireland) Karen Nugent	7–6^{(5)}, 6–4
Runner-up	3.	16 September 2001	Ibaraki, Japan	Hard	(Australia) Beti Sekulovski	(Australia) Samantha Stosur (Australia) Melissa Dowse	4–6, 7–5, 2–6
Runner-up	4.	23 September 2001	Osaka, Japan	Hard	(Australia) Beti Sekulovski	(Australia) Samantha Stosur (Australia) Melissa Dowse	7–5, 3–6, 3–6
Runner-up	5.	3 February 2002	Wellington, New Zealand	Hard	(Australia) Nicole Kriz	(Chinese Taipei) Chan Chin-wei (Chinese Taipei) Chuang Chia-jung	6–4 6–7^{(3)} 2–6
Winner	6.	25 February 2002	Bendigo, Australia	Hard	(Australia) Samantha Stosur	(Australia) Trudi Musgrave (Australia) Cindy Watson	6–4, 6–3
Winner	7.	4 March 2002	Warrnambool, Australia	Grass	(Australia) Samantha Stosur	(United States) Amanda Augustus (Republic of Ireland) Claire Curran	6–0, 4–6, 6–3
Winner	8.	11 March 2002	Benalla, Australia	Grass	(Australia) Nicole Kriz	(Australia) Casey Dellacqua (Germany) Svenja Weidemann	7–5, 6–1
Winner	9.	23 March 2002	Bendigo, Australia	Grass	(Australia) Nicole Kriz	(Australia) Rochelle Rosenfield (Germany) Madita Suer	3–6, 7–5, 6–3
Winner	10.	10 June 2002	Raalte, Netherlands	Clay	(Netherlands) Jolanda Mens	(Australia) Darya Ivanova (Australia) Tiffany Welford	4–6, 6–3, 6–0
Runner-up	11.	24 June 2002	Alkmaar, Netherlands	Clay	(Netherlands) Jolanda Mens	(Netherlands) Kim Kilsdonk (Austria) Nicole Melch	6–7^{(2)}, 2–6
Runner-up	12.	8 July 2002	Felixstowe, UK	Grass	(Australia) Christina Horiatopoulos	(United States) Amanda Augustus (Australia) Nicole Sewell	6–7^{(5)}, 4–6
Runner-up	13.	29 July 2002	Open Saint-Gaudens, France	Clay	(Australia) Samantha Stosur	(Slovakia) Ľudmila Cervanová (Slovakia) Stanislava Hrozenská	6–7^{(5)}, 4–6
Winner	14.	5 August 2002	GB Pro-Series Bath, UK	Hard	(Australia) Samantha Stosur	(Greece) Asimina Kaplani (Greece) Maria Pavlidou	6–4, 6–1
Winner	15.	12 August 2002	London, England	Hard	(Republic of Ireland) Elsa O'Riain	(Australia) Michelle Summerside (United Kingdom) Anna White	6–4, 6–2
Runner-up	16.	9 September 2002	Bordeaux, France	Clay	(Australia) Samantha Stosur	(Italy) Flavia Pennetta (Romania) Andreea Ehritt-Vanc	3–6, 5–7
Runner-up	17.	17 September 2002	GB Pro-Series Glasgow, UK	Hard	(Australia) Samantha Stosur	(Republic of Ireland) Yvonne Doyle (Republic of Ireland) Elsa O'Riain	2–6, 4–6
Runner-up	18.	14 October 2002	Mackay, Australia	Hard	(Australia) Samantha Stosur	(South Africa) Natalie Grandin (Australia) Nicole Sewell	3–6, 6–1, 4–6
Runner-up	19.	21 October 2002	Rockhampton, Australia	Hard	(Australia) Samantha Stosur	(Australia) Evie Dominikovic (Australia) Bryanne Stewart	5–7, 6–4, 5–7
Winner	20.	28 October 2002	Dalby, Australia	Hard	(Australia) Samantha Stosur	(Australia) Evie Dominikovic (Australia) Bryanne Stewart	6–3, 6–3
Winner	21.	7 April 2003	Coatzacoalcos, Mexico	Hard	(Argentina) Erica Krauth	(United Kingdom) Helen Crook (Greece) Christina Zachariadou	6–4, 4–6, 6–4
