= 2023 GB Pro-Series Glasgow – Singles =

Singles
- 2023 GB Pro-Series Glasgow

Final
- Champion: (Ukraine) Daria Snigur
- Runner-up: (Germany) Mona Barthel
- Score: 6–4, 6–4

Events
Singles	Doubles
← 2022 ·	GB Pro-Series Glasgow	· 2024 →

Yuriko Miyazaki was the defending champion but lost in the quarterfinals to Mona Barthel.

Daria Snigur won the title, defeating Mona Barthel in the final, 6–4, 6–4.

== Seeds ==
1. (Australia) Olivia Gadecki (second round, retired)
2. (United Kingdom) Harriet Dart (semifinals)
3. (Ukraine) Daria Snigur (champion)
4. (United Kingdom) Yuriko Miyazaki (quarterfinals)
5. (Germany) Jule Niemeier (first round)
6. (Czech Republic) Gabriela Knutson (second round)
7. (France) Chloé Paquet (first round)
8. (Philippines) Alex Eala (first round)

== Draw ==
=== Key ===
- Q = Qualifier
- WC = Wild card
- LL = Lucky loser
- Alt = Alternate
- SE = Special exempt
- PR = Protected ranking
- ITF = ITF entry
- JE = Junior exempt
- w/o = Walkover
- r = Retired
- d = Defaulted
- SR = Special ranking

=== Finals ===
Semifinals
Q	(United Kingdom) Mingge Xu	6	6^{4}	4
(Germany) Mona Barthel	3	7^{7}	6
3	(Ukraine) Daria Snigur	6	6
2	(United Kingdom) Harriet Dart	4	4

Final
(Germany) Mona Barthel	4	4
3	(Ukraine) Daria Snigur	6	6

=== Top half ===
First round
1	(Australia) O Gadecki	6	7
(Czech Republic) B Palicová	4	5
(Estonia) E Malõgina	0	2
WC	(United Kingdom) H Klugman	6	6
Q	(United Kingdom) M Xu	7	6
WC	(United Kingdom) I Lacy	5	2
(Uzbekistan) N Abduraimova	2	1
6	(Czech Republic) G Knutson	6	6
4	(United Kingdom) Y Miyazaki	6	1	6
Q	(United Kingdom) F Christie	2	6	3
Q	(United Kingdom) E Appleton	6	6
(Belgium) M Benoît	4	3
(Czech Republic) A Sisková	0	7^{8}	3
(Germany) M Barthel	6	6^{6}	6
(Netherlands) S Lamens	2	6	6
8	(Philippines) A Eala	6	4	1

Second round
1	(Australia) O Gadecki	4^{r}
WC	(United Kingdom) H Klugman	3
Q	(United Kingdom) M Xu	6	6
6	(Czech Republic) G Knutson	4	2
4	(United Kingdom) Y Miyazaki	4	6	6
Q	(United Kingdom) E Appleton	6	1	2
(Germany) M Barthel	7^{9}	3	6
(Netherlands) S Lamens	6^{7}	6	3

Quarterfinals
WC	(United Kingdom) H Klugman	3	2
Q	(United Kingdom) M Xu	6	6
3	(United Kingdom) Y Miyazaki	2	3
(Germany) M Barthel	6	6

Semifinals
Q	(United Kingdom) M Xu	6	6^{4}	4
(Germany) M Barthel	3	7^{7}	6

=== Bottom half ===
First round
7	(France) C Paquet	1	6	6^{3}
Q	(Austria) T Paszek	6	2	7^{7}
Q	(Sweden) K Rinaldo Persson	6	7
WC	(United Kingdom) M Stojsavljevic	3	5
Q	(United Kingdom) H Hutchinson	2	2
(Portugal) F Jorge	6	6
(Croatia) L Bošković	3	3
3	(Ukraine) D Snigur	6	6
5	(Germany) J Niemeier	3	1
Q	(Switzerland) V Ryser	6	6
WC	(United Kingdom) A Brogan	6^{3}	6	6
Q	(Netherlands) A Koevermans	7^{7}	4	4
SE	(United Kingdom) A Banks	6	6
(Bulgaria) G Topalova	3	1
(Turkey) B Cengiz	0	1
2	(United Kingdom) H Dart	6	6

Second round
Q	(Austria) T Paszek	1	6	4
Q	(Sweden) K Rinaldo Persson	6	3	6
(Portugal) F Jorge	6^{4}	2
3	(Ukraine) D Snigur	7^{7}	6
Q	(Switzerland) V Ryser	6	3	4
WC	(United Kingdom) A Brogan	2	6	6
SE	(United Kingdom) A Banks
2	(United Kingdom) H Dart	w/o

Quarterfinals
Q	(Sweden) K Rinaldo Persson	7^{11}	0	1^{r}
3	(Ukraine) D Snigur	6^{9}	6	2
WC	(United Kingdom) A Brogan	3	2
2	(United Kingdom) H Dart	6	6

Semifinals
3	(Ukraine) D Snigur	6	6
2	(United Kingdom) H Dart	4	4
