= 2023 GB Pro-Series Glasgow – Doubles =

Doubles
- 2023 GB Pro-Series Glasgow

Final
- Champions: (Portugal) Francisca Jorge (United Kingdom) Maia Lumsden
- Runners-up: (United Kingdom) Freya Christie (Australia) Olivia Gadecki
- Score: 6–3, 6–1

Events
Singles	Doubles
← 2022 ·	GB Pro-Series Glasgow	· 2024 →

Freya Christie and Ali Collins were the defending champions but chose to compete with different partners. Collins partnered alongside Berfu Cengiz but lost in the first round to Alex Eala and Barbora Palicová.

Francisca Jorge and Maia Lumsden won the title, defeating Christie and Olivia Gadecki in the final, 6–3, 6–1.

== Seeds ==
1. (Portugal) Francisca Jorge / (United Kingdom) Maia Lumsden (champions)
2. (United Kingdom) Freya Christie / (Australia) Olivia Gadecki (final)
3. (France) Estelle Cascino / (Netherlands) Suzan Lamens (quarterfinals)
4. (Uzbekistan) Nigina Abduraimova / (Netherlands) Jasmijn Gimbrère (first round)

== Draw ==
=== Key ===
- Q = Qualifier
- WC = Wild card
- LL = Lucky loser
- Alt = Alternate
- SE = Special exempt
- PR = Protected ranking
- ITF = ITF entry
- JE = Junior exempt
- w/o = Walkover
- r = Retired
- d = Defaulted
- SR = Special ranking

First round
1	(Portugal) F Jorge (United Kingdom) M Lumsden	6	6
WC	(United Kingdom) H Oluwadare (United Kingdom) M Stojsavljevic	0	3
(Sweden) K Rinaldo Persson (Czech Republic) A Sisková	6^{2}	7^{7}	[10]
(Slovakia) K Strešnáková (United Kingdom) E Webley-Smith	7^{7}	6^{1}	[8]
3	(France) E Cascino (Netherlands) S Lamens	6	6
(Slovakia) V Morvayová (Slovakia) R Zelníčková	3	2
(United Kingdom) M Brooks (United Kingdom) H Hutchinson	2	2
WC	(United Kingdom) E Appleton (United Kingdom) S Murray Sharan	6	6
(Estonia) E Malõgina (Hungary) A Nagy	2	1
(Georgia (country)) M Bolkvadze (United Kingdom) Y Miyazaki	6	6
WC	(United Kingdom) H Klugman (United Kingdom) I Lacy	4	6	[11]
4	(Uzbekistan) N Abduraimova (Netherlands) J Gimbrère	6	3	[9]
(Turkey) B Cengiz (United Kingdom) A Collins	6	2	[2]
(Philippines) A Eala (Czech Republic) B Palicová	4	6	[10]
(United Kingdom) K Dunne (United Kingdom) E McDonald	2	2
2	(United Kingdom) F Christie (Australia) O Gadecki	6	6

Quarterfinals
1	(Portugal) F Jorge (United Kingdom) M Lumsden	6	6
(Sweden) K Rinaldo Persson (Czech Republic) A Sisková	4	4
3	(France) E Cascino (Netherlands) S Lamens	6^{5}	6	[3]
WC	(United Kingdom) E Appleton (United Kingdom) S Murray Sharan	7^{7}	3	[10]
(Georgia (country)) M Bolkvadze (United Kingdom) Y Miyazaki	6	6
WC	(United Kingdom) H Klugman (United Kingdom) I Lacy	2	1
(Philippines) A Eala (Czech Republic) B Palicová
2	(United Kingdom) F Christie (Australia) O Gadecki	w/o

Semifinals
1	(Portugal) F Jorge (United Kingdom) M Lumsden	6	7
WC	(United Kingdom) E Appleton (United Kingdom) S Murray Sharan	2	5
(Georgia (country)) M Bolkvadze (United Kingdom) Y Miyazaki	3	3
2	(United Kingdom) F Christie (Australia) O Gadecki	6	6

Final
1	(Portugal) F Jorge (United Kingdom) M Lumsden	6	6
2	(United Kingdom) F Christie (Australia) O Gadecki	3	1
