= GB Pro-Series Glasgow =

- 2023 GB Pro-Series Glasgow

Tournament information
- Event name: Glasgow
- Location: Glasgow, United Kingdom
- Venue: Scotstoun Leisure Centre
- Surface: Hard / indoors
- Website: Official Website
ATP Tour
- Category: ATP Challenger Tour
- Draw: 32S / 32Q / 16D
- Prize money: €42,500
WTA Tour
- Category: ITF Women's Circuit
- Draw: 32S / 32Q / 16D
- Prize money: $60,000 / $25,000

The GB Pro-Series Glasgow is a professional tennis tournament played on indoor hardcourts. The tournament was previously part of the ATP Challenger Tour and is currently part of the ITF Women's Circuit and the ITF Men's Circuit. The tournament is held in Glasgow, United Kingdom, since 1998. The event is held at the Scotstoun Tennis Centre.

== Past finals ==
=== Men's singles ===
Year	Champion	Runner-up	Score
2015	(Belgium) Niels Desein	(Belgium) Ruben Bemelmans	7–6^{(7–4)}, 2–6, 7–6^{(7–4)}

=== Men's doubles ===
Year	Champions	Runners-up	Score
2015	(Netherlands) Wesley Koolhof (Netherlands) Matwé Middelkoop	(Ukraine) Sergei Bubka (Kazakhstan) Aleksandr Nedovyesov	6–1, 6–4

=== Women's singles ===
Year	Champion	Runner-up	Score
2026	(Netherlands) Suzan Lamens	(United States) Fiona Crawley	6–4, 6–3
2025	(Ukraine) Daria Snigur	(Switzerland) Susan Bandecchi	6–4, 6–3
2024	(Switzerland) Simona Waltert	(Georgia (country)) Mariam Bolkvadze	6–4, 6–2
2023 (2)	(Ukraine) Daria Snigur	(Germany) Mona Barthel	6–4, 6–4
2023 (1)	(Belgium) Marie Benoît	(United Kingdom) Heather Watson	3–6, 6–4, 6–1
2022 (2)	(United Kingdom) Lily Miyazaki	(United Kingdom) Heather Watson	5–7, 7–6^{(7–5)}, 6–2
2022 (1)	(United Kingdom) Sonay Kartal	(Czech Republic) Barbora Palicová	7–6^{(7–5)}, 7–5
2021	Tournament cancelled due to the COVID-19 pandemic		
2020	(Denmark) Clara Tauson	(Bulgaria) Viktoriya Tomova	6–4, 6–0
2019	(France) Jessika Ponchet	(Georgia (country)) Mariam Bolkvadze	6–3, 6–1
2018	(Spain) Paula Badosa	(United Kingdom) Maia Lumsden	2–6, 6–1, 6–3
2017	(Czech Republic) Petra Krejsová	(Netherlands) Bibiane Schoofs	2–6, 7–5, 6–4
2016	(Germany) Anna Zaja	(United Kingdom) Maia Lumsden	6–4, 6–3
2015	(Czech Republic) Kristýna Plíšková	(Romania) Ana Bogdan	6–2, 6–2
2014	(United Kingdom) Tara Moore	(France) Myrtille Georges	6–3, 6–1
2013	(United Kingdom) Tara Moore	(France) Myrtille Georges	6–4, 6–1
2012^{(2)}	(United Kingdom) Samantha Murray	(Belgium) Alison Van Uytvanck	6–3, 2–6, 6–3
2012^{(1)}	(Belgium) Alison Van Uytvanck	(United Kingdom) Francesca Stephenson	6–3, 6–0
2011^{(2)}	(France) Claire Feuerstein	(Austria) Yvonne Meusburger	6–3, 6–1
2011^{(1)}	(Croatia) Jasmina Tinjić	(United Kingdom) Naomi Broady	6–2, 6–2
2010^{(2)}	(Czech Republic) Karolína Plíšková	(Greece) Eirini Georgatou	3–6, 6–0, 6–3
2010^{(1)}	(Germany) Sarah Gronert	(Germany) Julia Babilon	2–6, 6–2, 6–1
2009^{(2)}	(Sweden) Johanna Larsson	(United Kingdom) Melanie South	6–1, 1–6, 6–3
2009^{(1)}	(Finland) Emma Laine	(France) Stéphanie Vongsouthi	4–6, 6–2, 7–6^{(7–2)}
2008	(Romania) Irina-Camelia Begu	(Austria) Patricia Mayr	2–6, 7–5, 7–6^{(7–1)}
2007	(Sweden) Sofia Arvidsson	(United Kingdom) Katie O'Brien	6–3, 6–1
2006	(Germany) Angelique Kerber	(Belgium) Kirsten Flipkens	6–4, 6–2
2005	(Germany) Kristina Barrois	(Germany) Gréta Arn	6–3, 3–6, 6–4
2004	(Estonia) Margit Rüütel	(Austria) Sybille Bammer	3–6, 6–1, 7–5
2003	(Sweden) Sofia Arvidsson	(Netherlands) Tessy van de Ven	3–6, 6–3, 6–3
2002	(Tunisia) Selima Sfar	(United Kingdom) Anne Keothavong	7–6^{(7–5)}, 2–6, 7–6^{(10–8)}
2001	(Czech Republic) Eva Birnerová	(France) Sophie Erre	3–6, 7–5, 6–4
2000	(Germany) Susi Bensch	(Germany) Stephanie Gehrlein	4–6, 6–2, 6–3
1999	(Germany) Gréta Arn	(India) Manisha Malhotra	walkover
1998	(Germany) Mia Buric	(Netherlands) Bretchtje Bruls	6–4, 3–6, 6–1

=== Women's doubles ===
Year	Champions	Runners-up	Score
2026	(United Kingdom) Savannah Dada-Mascoll (Kenya) Angella Okutoyi	(Estonia) Elena Malygina (United Kingdom) Amelia Rajecki	6–3, 6–3
2025	(Switzerland) Céline Naef (United States) Clervie Ngounoue	(United Kingdom) Freya Christie (United Kingdom) Lily Miyazaki	6–0, 6–4
2024	(United Kingdom) Jodie Burrage (United Kingdom) Freya Christie	(Georgia (country)) Mariam Bolkvadze (Netherlands) Isabelle Haverlag	6–4, 3–6, [10–5]
2023 (2)	(Portugal) Francisca Jorge (United Kingdom) Maia Lumsden	(United Kingdom) Freya Christie (Australia) Olivia Gadecki	6–3, 6–1
2023 (1)	(United Kingdom) Maia Lumsden (United Kingdom) Ella McDonald	(Czech Republic) Dominika Šalková (Czech Republic) Anna Sisková	3–6, 6–1, [13–11]
2022 (2)	(United Kingdom) Freya Christie (United Kingdom) Ali Collins	(Spain) Irene Burillo Escorihuela (Spain) Andrea Lázaro García	6–4, 6–1
2022 (1)	(United States) Quinn Gleason (United States) Catherine Harrison	(Lithuania) Justina Mikulskytė (Russia) Valeria Savinykh	6–4, 6–1
2021	Tournament cancelled due to the COVID-19 pandemic		
2020	(France) Myrtille Georges (Belgium) Kimberley Zimmermann	(Belgium) Lara Salden (Denmark) Clara Tauson	7–6^{(7–2)}, 7–6^{(7–5)}
2019	(Netherlands) Lesley Kerkhove (Germany) Anna Zaja	(United Kingdom) Freya Christie (Croatia) Jana Fett	6–4, 3–6, [10–3]
2018	(Belgium) Ysaline Bonaventure (Greece) Valentini Grammatikopoulou	(Hungary) Dalma Gálfi (Poland) Katarzyna Piter	7–5, 6–4
2017	(United Kingdom) Jocelyn Rae (United Kingdom) Anna Smith	(Romania) Laura Ioana Andrei (Czech Republic) Petra Krejsová	6–3, 6–2
2016	(Switzerland) Nina Stadler (Belgium) Kimberley Zimmermann	(Oman) Fatma Al-Nabhani (Germany) Anna Zaja	6–2, 7–6^{(9–7)}
2015	(Italy) Corinna Dentoni (Italy) Claudia Giovine	(United Kingdom) Tara Moore (Switzerland) Conny Perrin	0–6, 6–1, [10–7]
2014	(United Kingdom) Jocelyn Rae (United Kingdom) Anna Smith	(Czech Republic) Martina Borecká (Czech Republic) Tereza Malíková	4–6, 6–2, [10–4]
2013	(United Kingdom) Tara Moore (United Kingdom) Melanie South	(United Kingdom) Anna Smith (United Kingdom) Francesca Stephenson	7–6^{(7–5)}, 6–3
2012^{(2)}	(Poland) Justyna Jegiołka (Latvia) Diāna Marcinkēviča	(Italy) Nicole Clerico (Germany) Anna Zaja	6–2, 6–1
2012^{(1)}	(United Kingdom) Anna Fitzpatrick (United Kingdom) Samantha Murray	(United Kingdom) Alexandra Walker (United Kingdom) Lisa Whybourn	6–2, 6–3
2011^{(2)}	(Finland) Emma Laine (France) Kristina Mladenovic	(Austria) Yvonne Meusburger (Liechtenstein) Stephanie Vogt	6–2, 6–4
2011^{(1)}	(Norway) Ulrikke Eikeri (Bulgaria) Isabella Shinikova	(Serbia) Teodora Mirčić (Croatia) Jasmina Tinjić	6–4, 6–4
2010^{(2)}	(Denmark) Karen Barbat (Italy) Julia Mayr	(Greece) Eirini Georgatou (Russia) Valeria Savinykh	walkover
2010^{(1)}	(France) Victoria Larrière (United Kingdom) Anna Smith	(Italy) Nicole Clerico (Romania) Liana Ungur	6–4, 6–4
2009^{(2)}	(Finland) Emma Laine (United Kingdom) Melanie South	(Italy) Evelyn Mayr (Italy) Julia Mayr	6–3, 6–2
2009^{(1)}	(Austria) Sandra Klemenschits (Luxembourg) Claudine Schaul	(Netherlands) Nicolette van Uitert (Belarus) Viktoria Yemialyanava	6–3, 4–6, [10–7]
2008	(Switzerland) Stefania Boffa (United Kingdom) Amanda Elliott	(Romania) Laura-Ioana Andrei (Romania) Irina-Camelia Begu	6–4, 7–6^{(7–3)}
2007	(Sweden) Sofia Arvidsson (Sweden) Johanna Larsson	(Czech Republic) Veronika Chvojková (Germany) Kathrin Wörle	6–3, 6–2
2006	(Czech Republic) Veronika Chvojková (Latvia) Līga Dekmeijere	(United Kingdom) Katie O'Brien (Estonia) Margit Rüütel	6–4, 6–3
2005	(United Kingdom) Elena Baltacha (Estonia) Margit Rüütel	(United Kingdom) Anne Keothavong (United Kingdom) Karen Paterson	6–3, 6–7^{(2–7)}, 6–2
2004	(New Zealand) Leanne Baker (Italy) Francesca Lubiani	(Republic of Ireland) Claire Curran (Turkey) İpek Şenoğlu	6–3, 5–7, 6–4
2003	(Netherlands) Kim Kilsdonk (Australia) Nicole Kriz	(New Zealand) Leanne Baker (Italy) Francesca Lubiani	7–5, 6–2
2002	(Republic of Ireland) Yvonne Doyle (Republic of Ireland) Elsa O'Riain	(Australia) Sarah Stone (Australia) Samantha Stosur	6–2, 6–4
2001	(Belgium) Leslie Butkiewicz (Belgium) Patty Van Acker	(Sweden) Helena Ejeson (Czech Republic) Eva Erbová	6–2, 6–2
2000	(United Kingdom) Anna Hawkins (United Kingdom) Abigail Tordoff	(United Kingdom) Julia Smith (Japan) Remi Tezuka	6–2, 6–2
1999	(United Kingdom) Lizzie Jelfs (Republic of Ireland) Karen Nugent	(Germany) Gréta Arn (India) Manisha Malhotra	walkover
1998	(Denmark) Eva Dyrberg (Germany) Lydia Steinbach	(United Kingdom) Helen Crook (United Kingdom) Victoria Davies	6–4, 5–7, 6–3
