= 2015 Aegon GB Pro-Series Glasgow =

- Date: 3–9 February
- Edition: 1st
- Draw: 32S / 16D
- Prize money: €42,500
- Surface: Hard
- Location: Glasgow, Scotland

Champions

Singles
- (Belgium) Niels Desein

Doubles
- (Netherlands) Wesley Koolhof / (Netherlands) Matwé Middelkoop
- Aegon GB Pro-Series Glasgow

The 2015 Aegon GB Pro-Series Glasgow was a professional tennis tournament played on indoor hard courts. It was the first edition of the tournament, which was part of the 2015 ATP Challenger Tour. It took place in Glasgow, Scotland from February 3 to February 9, 2015.

== Singles main-draw entrants ==
=== Seeds ===
| Country | Player | Rank^{1} | Seed |
|---|---|---|---|
| KAZ | Aleksandr Nedovyesov | 128 | 1 |
| POL | Michał Przysiężny | 170 | 2 |
| BEL | Ruben Bemelmans | 173 | 3 |
| SVK | Andrej Martin | 175 | 4 |
| ITA | Andrea Arnaboldi | 178 | 5 |
| GER | Julian Reister | 181 | 6 |
| GER | Tim Pütz | 183 | 7 |
| ITA | Matteo Viola | 190 | 8 |

- Rankings are as of January 19, 2015.

=== Other entrants ===
The following players received wildcards into the singles main draw:

- (United Kingdom) Daniel Cox
- (United Kingdom) Ewan Moore
- (United Kingdom) Daniel Smethurst
- (United Kingdom) Alexander Ward

The following players received entry from the qualifying draw:

- (Germany) Pirmin Haenle
- (Netherlands) Matwé Middelkoop
- (United Kingdom) Joshua Milton
- (United Kingdom) Marcus Willis

== Champions ==
=== Singles ===
- (Belgium) Niels Desein def. (Belgium) Ruben Bemelmans 7–6^{(7–4)}, 2–6, 7–6^{(7–4)}

=== Doubles ===
- (Netherlands) Wesley Koolhof / (Netherlands) Matwé Middelkoop def. (Ukraine) Sergei Bubka / (Kazakhstan) Aleksandr Nedovyesov 6–1, 6–4
