= 2015 Aegon GB Pro-Series Glasgow – Singles =

Singles
- 2015 Aegon GB Pro-Series Glasgow

Final
- Champion: (Belgium) Niels Desein
- Runner-up: (Belgium) Ruben Bemelmans
- Score: 7–6^{(7–4)}, 2–6, 7–6^{(7–4)}

Events
| Singles | Doubles |
| Aegon GB Pro-Series Glasgow |

This was the first edition of the tournament. Niels Desein won his maiden ATP Challenger Tour title, beating countryman Ruben Bemelmans 7–6^{(7–4)}, 2–6, 7–6^{(7–4)}

== Seeds ==
1. (Kazakhstan) Aleksandr Nedovyesov (semifinals)
2. (Poland) Michał Przysiężny (second round)
3. (Belgium) Ruben Bemelmans (final)
4. (Slovakia) Andrej Martin (second round)
5. (Italy) Andrea Arnaboldi (first round)
6. (Germany) Julian Reister (second round)
7. (Germany) Tim Pütz (first round)
8. (Italy) Matteo Viola (first round)

== Draw ==
=== Key ===
- Q = Qualifier
- WC = Wild card
- LL = Lucky loser
- Alt = Alternate
- SE = Special exempt
- PR = Protected ranking
- ITF = ITF entry
- JE = Junior exempt
- w/o = Walkover
- r = Retired
- d = Defaulted
- SR = Special ranking

=== Finals ===
Semifinals
1 | (Kazakhstan) Aleksandr Nedovyesov | 1 | 1
(Belgium) Niels Desein | 6 | 6
3 | (Belgium) Ruben Bemelmans | 6 | 7
(France) David Guez | 3 | 5

Final
(Belgium) Niels Desein | 7^{7} | 2 | 7^{7}
3 | (Belgium) Ruben Bemelmans | 6^{4} | 6 | 6^{4}

=== Top half ===
First round
1 | (Kazakhstan) A Nedovyesov | 7^{7} | 6
(Germany) P Torebko | 6^{2} | 4
(France) A Michon | 6 | 4
(Switzerland) Y Marti | 3 | 0^{r}
WC | (United Kingdom) D Cox | 6 | 6
Q | (Netherlands) M Middelkoop | 4 | 1
WC | (United Kingdom) D Smethurst | 7 | 7^{7}
5 | (Italy) A Arnaboldi | 5 | 6^{4}
4 | (Slovakia) A Martin | 7^{7} | 6
(Germany) N Langer | 6^{1} | 4
WC | (United Kingdom) A Ward | 3 | 3
(United Kingdom) E Corrie | 6 | 6
(Slovakia) J Kovalík | 6 | 3 | 3
(Serbia) P Krstin | 3 | 6 | 6
(Belgium) N Desein | 6 | 6
7 | (Germany) T Pütz | 3 | 2

Second round
1 | (Kazakhstan) A Nedovyesov | 5 | 6 | 6
(France) A Michon | 7 | 3 | 0
WC | (United Kingdom) D Cox | 6 | 6
WC | (United Kingdom) D Smethurst | 4 | 0
4 | (Slovakia) A Martin | 4 | 6^{5}
(United Kingdom) E Corrie | 6 | 7^{7}
(Serbia) P Krstin | 6 | 3 | 1
(Belgium) N Desein | 3 | 6 | 6

Quarterfinals
1 | (Kazakhstan) A Nedovyesov | 1 | 7^{7} | 7
WC | (United Kingdom) D Cox | 6 | 6^{4} | 5
(United Kingdom) E Corrie | 2 | 4
(Belgium) N Desein | 6 | 6

Semifinals
1 | (Kazakhstan) A Nedovyesov | 1 | 1
(Belgium) N Desein | 6 | 6

=== Bottom half ===
First round
6 | (Germany) J Reister | 6 | 6
Q | (United Kingdom) J Milton | 1 | 1
(Italy) R Marcora | 6 | 6
WC | (United Kingdom) Ewan Moore | 3 | 1
(France) J Eysseric | 6 | 3 | 6
(Spain) E López-Pérez | 4 | 6 | 0
(Czech Republic) A Pavlásek | 6 | 3 | 5
3 | (Belgium) R Bemelmans | 3 | 6 | 7
8 | (Italy) M Viola | 2 | 2
Q | (United Kingdom) M Willis | 6 | 6
(Belgium) M Authom | 6 | 6
(Republic of Ireland) L Sorensen | 2 | 0
Q | (Germany) Pirmin Haenle | 2 | 6^{6}
(France) T Lamasine | 6 | 7^{8}
(France) D Guez | 5 | 6 | 6
2 | (Poland) M Przysiężny | 7 | 4 | 2

Second round
6 | (Germany) J Reister | 6^{2} | 6^{6}
(Italy) R Marcora | 7^{7} | 7^{8}
(France) J Eysseric | 2 | 3
3 | (Belgium) R Bemelmans | 6 | 6
Q | (United Kingdom) M Willis | 4 | 6 | 3
(Belgium) M Authom | 6 | 3 | 6
(France) T Lamasine
(France) D Guez | w/o

Quarterfinals
(Italy) R Marcora | 4 | 3
3 | (Belgium) R Bemelmans | 6 | 6
(Belgium) M Authom | 5 | 2
(France) D Guez | 7 | 6

Semifinals
3 | (Belgium) R Bemelmans | 6 | 7
(France) D Guez | 3 | 5
