= 2015 Aegon GB Pro-Series Glasgow – Doubles =

Doubles
- 2015 Aegon GB Pro-Series Glasgow

Final
- Champions: (Netherlands) Wesley Koolhof (Netherlands) Matwé Middelkoop
- Runners-up: (Ukraine) Sergei Bubka (Kazakhstan) Aleksandr Nedovyesov
- Score: 6–1, 6–4

Events
Singles	Doubles
Aegon GB Pro-Series Glasgow

This was the first edition of the tournament. Wesley Koolhof and Matwé Middelkoop won the title, beating Sergei Bubka and Aleksandr Nedovyesov 6–1, 6–4

== Seeds ==
1. (Poland) Błażej Koniusz / (Poland) Mateusz Kowalczyk (quarterfinals)
2. (Italy) Riccardo Ghedin / (Italy) Claudio Grassi (first round)
3. (Poland) Andriej Kapaś / (Poland) Michał Przysiężny (first round)
4. (United Kingdom) Daniel Smethurst / (United Kingdom) Sean Thornley (quarterfinals)

== Draw ==
=== Key ===
- Q = Qualifier
- WC = Wild card
- LL = Lucky loser
- Alt = Alternate
- SE = Special exempt
- PR = Protected ranking
- ITF = ITF entry
- JE = Junior exempt
- w/o = Walkover
- r = Retired
- d = Defaulted
- SR = Special ranking

=== Draw ===
First round
1	(Poland) B Koniusz (Poland) M Kowalczyk	6	6
(Slovakia) A Martin (Slovakia) I Zelenay	4	2
(Italy) A Arnaboldi (Spain) E López-Pérez	1	7^{7}	[6]
(Belgium) M Authom (Belgium) R Bemelmans	6	6^{5}	[10]
3	(Poland) A Kapaś (Poland) M Przysiężny	6	3	[9]
WC	(United Kingdom) D Cox (United Kingdom) D Rice	3	6	[11]
(France) J Eysseric (France) T Lamasine	6	6^{3}	[8]
(Netherlands) W Koolhof (Netherlands) M Middelkoop	1	7^{7}	[10]
(Ukraine) S Bubka (Kazakhstan) A Nedovyesov	w/o
(Germany) N Langer (Republic of Ireland) L Sorensen
(Slovakia) J Kovalík (Germany) P Torebko	7^{10}	4	[6]
4	(United Kingdom) D Smethurst (United Kingdom) S Thornley	6^{8}	6	[10]
WC	(United Kingdom) L Burton (United Kingdom) M Willis	6^{1}	3
WC	(United Kingdom) L Bambridge (United Kingdom) J Salisbury	7^{7}	6
(Romania) P Grigoriu (Romania) C Pavăl	6	6
2	(Italy) R Ghedin (Italy) C Grassi	3	4

Quarterfinals
1	(Poland) B Koniusz (Poland) M Kowalczyk	5	3
(Belgium) M Authom (Belgium) R Bemelmans	7	6
WC	(United Kingdom) D Cox (United Kingdom) D Rice	1	5
(Netherlands) W Koolhof (Netherlands) M Middelkoop	6	7
(Ukraine) S Bubka (Kazakhstan) A Nedovyesov	6	6
4	(United Kingdom) D Smethurst (United Kingdom) S Thornley	2	3
WC	(United Kingdom) L Bambridge (United Kingdom) J Salisbury	6	6
(Romania) P Grigoriu (Romania) C Pavăl	2	4

Semifinals
(Belgium) M Authom (Belgium) R Bemelmans	3	6^{7}
(Netherlands) W Koolhof (Netherlands) M Middelkoop	6	7^{9}
(Ukraine) S Bubka (Kazakhstan) A Nedovyesov	3	7	[10]
WC	(United Kingdom) L Bambridge (United Kingdom) J Salisbury	6	5	[7]

Final
(Netherlands) W Koolhof (Netherlands) M Middelkoop	6	6
(Ukraine) S Bubka (Kazakhstan) A Nedovyesov	1	4
