= 2022 GB Pro-Series Glasgow – Doubles =

Doubles
- 2022 GB Pro-Series Glasgow

Final
- Champions: (United Kingdom) Freya Christie (United Kingdom) Ali Collins
- Runners-up: (Spain) Irene Burillo Escorihuela (Spain) Andrea Lázaro García
- Score: 6–4, 6–1

Events
Singles	Doubles
← 2022 ·	GB Pro-Series Glasgow	· 2023 →

Quinn Gleason and Catherine Harrison are the defending champions, but both players chose not to participate.

Freya Christie and Ali Collins won the title, defeating Irene Burillo Escorihuela and Andrea Lázaro García in the final, 6–4, 6–1.

== Seeds ==
1. (United Kingdom) Freya Christie / (United Kingdom) Ali Collins (champions)
2. (Uzbekistan) Nigina Abduraimova / (Latvia) Diāna Marcinkēviča (first round)
3. (United Kingdom) Emily Appleton / (United Kingdom) Yuriko Miyazaki (semifinals)
4. (United Kingdom) Jodie Burrage / (United Kingdom) Heather Watson (quarterfinals)

== Draw ==
=== Key ===
- Q = Qualifier
- WC = Wild card
- LL = Lucky loser
- Alt = Alternate
- SE = Special exempt
- PR = Protected ranking
- ITF = ITF entry
- JE = Junior exempt
- w/o = Walkover
- r = Retired
- d = Defaulted
- SR = Special ranking

=== Draw ===
First round
(India) H Baharmus (Turkey) İ Yörük	2	2
(Bosnia and Herzegovina) N Berberović (Poland) M Kubka	6	6
3	(United Kingdom) E Appleton (United Kingdom) Y Miyazaki	6	6
(United Kingdom) A Stuart (United Kingdom) E Tsimbilakis	0	1
(United Kingdom) A Amos (Slovakia) L Svatíková	6	6
(United Kingdom) A Greatorex (United Kingdom) J Matthews	1	2
(Indonesia) B Gumulya (France) M Partaud	1	4
(Spain) I Burillo Escorihuela (Spain) A Lázaro García	6	6
(United Kingdom) E Maloney (United Kingdom) E Wilson	1	4
4	(United Kingdom) J Burrage (United Kingdom) H Watson	6	6
(Chinese Taipei) J Garland (Estonia) E Malõgina	6	6
(France) J Belgraver (Malta) F Curmi	2	4
(Algeria) I Ibbou (France) Y Mansouri	7^{8}	4	[11]
2	(Uzbekistan) N Abduraimova (Latvia) D Marcinkēviča	6^{6}	6	[9]

Quarterfinals
1	(United Kingdom) F Christie (United Kingdom) A Collins	7	4	[10]
(Bosnia and Herzegovina) N Berberović (Poland) M Kubka	5	6	[8]
3	(United Kingdom) E Appleton (United Kingdom) Y Miyazaki	6	6
(United Kingdom) A Amos (Slovakia) L Svatíková	2	3
(Spain) I Burillo Escorihuela (Spain) A Lázaro García	6	6
4	(United Kingdom) J Burrage (United Kingdom) H Watson	1	4
(Chinese Taipei) J Garland (Estonia) E Malõgina	6	6
(Algeria) I Ibbou (France) Y Mansouri	2	3

Semifinals
1	(United Kingdom) F Christie (United Kingdom) A Collins	7	5	[10]
3	(United Kingdom) E Appleton (United Kingdom) Y Miyazaki	5	7	[4]
(Spain) I Burillo Escorihuela (Spain) A Lázaro García	6	4	[10]
(Chinese Taipei) J Garland (Estonia) E Malõgina	3	6	[8]

Final
1	(United Kingdom) F Christie (United Kingdom) A Collins	6	6
(Spain) I Burillo Escorihuela (Spain) A Lázaro García	4	1
