= 2023 GB Pro-Series Glasgow =

Tennis tournament

- Date: 23–29 October 2023
- Edition: 30th
- Category: ITF Women's World Tennis Tour
- Prize money: $60,000
- Surface: Hard / Indoor
- Location: Glasgow, United Kingdom

Champions

Singles
- (Ukraine) Daria Snigur

Doubles
- (Portugal) Francisca Jorge / (United Kingdom) Maia Lumsden
| ← 2022 · | GB Pro-Series Glasgow | · 2024 → |

The 2023 GB Pro-Series Glasgow is a professional tennis tournament played on indoor hard courts. It is the thirtieth edition of the tournament which was part of the 2023 ITF Women's World Tennis Tour. It took place in Glasgow, United Kingdom between 23 and 29 October 2023.

== Champions ==
=== Singles ===
- (Ukraine) Daria Snigur def. (Germany) Mona Barthel, 6–4, 6–4

=== Doubles ===
- (Portugal) Francisca Jorge / (United Kingdom) Maia Lumsden def. (United Kingdom) Freya Christie / (Australia) Olivia Gadecki, 6–3, 6–1

== Singles main draw entrants ==
=== Seeds ===
| Country | Player | Rank^{1} | Seed |
|---|---|---|---|
| AUS | Olivia Gadecki | 127 | 1 |
| GBR | Harriet Dart | 143 | 2 |
| UKR | Daria Snigur | 154 | 3 |
| GBR | Yuriko Miyazaki | 163 | 4 |
| GER | Jule Niemeier | 173 | 5 |
| CZE | Gabriela Knutson | 178 | 6 |
| FRA | Chloé Paquet | 187 | 7 |
| PHI | Alex Eala | 196 | 8 |

- ^{1} Rankings are as of 16 October 2023.

=== Other entrants ===
The following players received wildcards into the singles main draw:

- (United Kingdom) Anna Brogan
- (United Kingdom) Hannah Klugman
- (United Kingdom) Isabelle Lacy
- (United Kingdom) Mika Stojsavljevic

The following player received entry into the singles main draw using a special exempt:

- (United Kingdom) Amarni Banks

The following players received entry from the qualifying draw:

- (United Kingdom) Emily Appleton
- (United Kingdom) Freya Christie
- (United Kingdom) Holly Hutchinson
- (Netherlands) Anouk Koevermans
- (Austria) Tamira Paszek
- (Sweden) Kajsa Rinaldo Persson
- (Switzerland) Valentina Ryser
- (United Kingdom) Mingge Xu
