= 2022 GB Pro-Series Glasgow – Singles =

Singles
- 2022 GB Pro-Series Glasgow

Final
- Champion: (United Kingdom) Yuriko Miyazaki
- Runner-up: (United Kingdom) Heather Watson
- Score: 5–7, 7–6^{(7–5)}, 6–2

Events
| Singles | Doubles |
| ← 2022 · | GB Pro-Series Glasgow | · 2023 → |

Sonay Kartal was the defending champion but chose not to participate.

Yuriko Miyazaki won the title, defeating Heather Watson in the final, 5–7, 7–6^{(7–5)}, 6–2.

== Seeds ==
1. (United Kingdom) Katie Swan (second round)
2. (United Kingdom) Katie Boulter (quarterfinals)
3. (United Kingdom) Jodie Burrage (semifinals)
4. (United Kingdom) Heather Watson (final)
5. (Spain) Aliona Bolsova (quarterfinals)
6. (Uzbekistan) Nigina Abduraimova (semifinals)
7. (Netherlands) Lesley Pattinama Kerkhove (quarterfinals)
8. (Bosnia and Herzegovina) Nefisa Berberović (second round)

== Draw ==
=== Key ===
- Q = Qualifier
- WC = Wild card
- LL = Lucky loser
- Alt = Alternate
- SE = Special exempt
- PR = Protected ranking
- ITF = ITF entry
- JE = Junior exempt
- w/o = Walkover
- r = Retired
- d = Defaulted
- SR = Special ranking

=== Finals ===
Semifinals
(United Kingdom) Yuriko Miyazaki | 6 | 7^{7}
3 | (United Kingdom) Jodie Burrage | 3 | 6^{4}
4 | (United Kingdom) Heather Watson | 6 | 6
6 | (Uzbekistan) Nigina Abduraimova | 2 | 3

Final
(United Kingdom) Yuriko Miyazaki | 5 | 7^{7} | 6
4 | (United Kingdom) Heather Watson | 7 | 6^{5} | 2

=== Top half ===
First round
1 | (United Kingdom) K Swan | 6 | 6
(France) M Partaud | 2 | 1
WC | (United Kingdom) A Brogan | 5 | 6 | 2
(United Kingdom) Y Miyazaki | 7 | 3 | 6
(Latvia) D Marcinkēviča | 3 | 4
Q | (France) J Belgraver | 6 | 6
WC | (United Kingdom) E McDonald | 1 | 4
8 | (Bosnia and Herzegovina) N Berberović | 6 | 6
3 | (United Kingdom) J Burrage | 6 | 6
(Estonia) E Malõgina | 2 | 2
WC | (United Kingdom) J Conway | 3 | 2
WC | (United Kingdom) A Banks | 6 | 6
Q | (Switzerland) F Ganz | 5 | 6 | 6
Q | (Algeria) I Ibbou | 7 | 2 | 1
(Spain) I Burillo Escorihuela | 0 | 1
7 | (Netherlands) L Pattinama Kerkhove | 6 | 6

Second round
1 | (United Kingdom) K Swan | 6 | 4 | 2
(United Kingdom) Y Miyazaki | 4 | 6 | 6
Q | (France) J Belgraver | 6 | 7^{9}
8 | (Bosnia and Herzegovina) N Berberović | 3 | 7^{7}
3 | (United Kingdom) J Burrage | 6 | 6
WC | (United Kingdom) A Banks | 4 | 3
Q | (Switzerland) F Ganz | 2 | 5
7 | (Netherlands) L Pattinama Kerkhove | 6 | 7

Quarterfinals
(United Kingdom) Y Miyazaki | 5
Q | (France) J Belgraver | 4^{r}
3 | (United Kingdom) J Burrage | 6 | 6
7 | (Netherlands) L Pattinama Kerkhove | 3 | 1

Semifinals
(United Kingdom) Y Miyazaki | 6 | 7^{7}
3 | (United Kingdom) J Burrage | 3 | 6^{4}

=== Bottom half ===
First round
5 | (Spain) A Bolsova | 6 | 3 | 6
(Spain) A Lázaro García | 2 | 6 | 4
Q | (Malta) F Curmi | 6^{4} | 2
Q | (United Kingdom) E Appleton | 7^{7} | 6
(Poland) M Kubka | 2 | 4
Q | (United Kingdom) T Neilson Gatenby | 6 | 6
LL | (Estonia) M Nuudi | 7^{9} | 4 | 1
4 | (United Kingdom) H Watson | 6^{7} | 6 | 6
6 | (Uzbekistan) N Abduraimova | 6 | 6
(United Kingdom) F Christie | 3 | 1
PR | (United Kingdom) M Lumsden | 7 | 6
Q | (United Kingdom) E Maloney | 5 | 2
Q | (Austria) T Paszek | 6 | 6
(Chinese Taipei) J Garland | 4 | 3
(Denmark) S Samavati | 3 | 3
2 | (United Kingdom) K Boulter | 6 | 6

Second round
5 | (Spain) A Bolsova | 7 | 6
Q | (United Kingdom) E Appleton | 5 | 3
Q | (United Kingdom) T Neilson Gatenby | 7^{7} | 3 | 2
4 | (United Kingdom) H Watson | 6^{3} | 6 | 6
6 | (Uzbekistan) N Abduraimova | 2 | 6 | 4
PR | (United Kingdom) M Lumsden | 6 | 2 | 1^{r}
Q | (Austria) T Paszek | 5 | 4
2 | (United Kingdom) K Boulter | 7 | 6

Quarterfinals
5 | (Spain) A Bolsova | 1 | 1
4 | (United Kingdom) H Watson | 6 | 6
6 | (Uzbekistan) N Abduraimova | 6^{6} | 6 | 6
2 | (United Kingdom) K Boulter | 7^{8} | 4 | 4

Semifinals
4 | (United Kingdom) H Watson | 6 | 6
6 | (Uzbekistan) N Abduraimova | 2 | 3
