= Vladimíra Uhlířová =

Czech tennis player (born 1978)

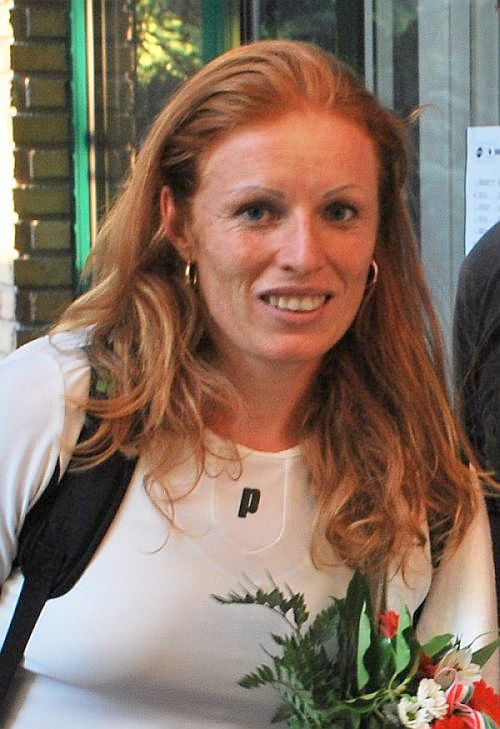
- Country (sports): Czech Republic
- Residence: London, England
- Born: 4 May 1978 (age 48) České Budějovice, Czechoslovakia
- Height: 1.65 m (5 ft 5 in)
- Turned pro: 2002
- Retired: 2016
- Plays: Right-handed (two-handed backhand)
- Prize money: $868,362

Singles
- Career record: 58–79
- Career titles: 0
- Highest ranking: No. 400 (6 October 2003)

Doubles
- Career record: 319–302
- Career titles: 5 WTA, 17 ITF
- Highest ranking: No. 18 (1 October 2007)

Grand Slam doubles results
- Australian Open: QF (2011)
- French Open: 3R (2007, 2008, 2011)
- Wimbledon: 3R (2012)
- US Open: SF (2007)

Grand Slam mixed doubles results
- Australian Open: 2R (2012)
- French Open: QF (2011)
- Wimbledon: 1R (2008, 2010)
- US Open: QF (2008)

Vladimíra Uhlířová (born 4 May 1978) is a retired Czech tennis player.

In her career, she won five doubles titles on the WTA Tour, as well as 17 doubles titles on the ITF Women's Circuit. In October 2003, she reached her best singles ranking of world No. 400. In October 2007, she peaked at No. 18 in the doubles rankings.

Uhlířová reached the semifinals of the 2007 US Open, partnering Ágnes Szávay.

She announced her retirement from professional tennis in January 2016.

Uhlířová now provides television commentary on the WTA Tour. She speaks several languages, and is therefore able to translate many of the non-English exchanges when on-court coaching takes place during matches.

== Grand Slam doubles performance timeline ==
Key
| W | F | SF | QF | #R | RR | Q# | DNQ | A | NH |

(W) winner; (F) finalist; (SF) semifinalist; (QF) quarterfinalist; (#R) rounds 4, 3, 2, 1; (RR) round-robin stage; (Q#) qualification round; (DNQ) did not qualify; (A) absent; (NH) not held; (SR) strike rate (events won / competed); (W–L) win–loss record.

| Tournament | 2006 | 2007 | 2008 | 2009 | 2010 | 2011 | 2012 | 2013 | 2014 | 2015 | W–L |
|---|---|---|---|---|---|---|---|---|---|---|---|
| Australian Open | A | 2R | 2R | 1R | 2R | QF | 2R | 3R | A | A | 9–7 |
| French Open | 2R | 3R | 3R | 2R | 2R | 3R | 2R | 1R | 1R | 1R | 10–10 |
| Wimbledon | 1R | 2R | 2R | 1R | 1R | 2R | 3R | 2R | A | A | 6–8 |
| US Open | 1R | SF | 1R | 1R | 1R | 1R | 2R | A | A | A | 5–7 |
| Win–loss | 1–3 | 8–4 | 4–4 | 1–4 | 2–4 | 6–4 | 5–4 | 3–3 | 0–1 | 0–1 | 30–32 |

== WTA Premier Mandatory & 5 tournaments ==
=== Doubles: 1 runner-up ===
| Result | Year | Tournament | Surface | Partner | Opponents | Score |
|---|---|---|---|---|---|---|
| Loss | 2011 | Cincinnati Open | Hard | (South Africa) Natalie Grandin | (United States) Vania King (Kazakhstan) Yaroslava Shvedova | 4–6, 6–3, [9–11] |

== WTA Tour finals ==
=== Doubles: 18 (5 titles, 13 runner-ups) ===
| Legend Premier Mandatory & Premier 5 (0–1) Tier II / Premier (1–4) Tier III & IV / International (4–8) | Finals by surface Hard (3–7) Clay (2–5) Carpet (0–1) |

| Result | W–L | Date | Tournament | Tier | Surface | Partner | Opponents | Score |
|---|---|---|---|---|---|---|---|---|
| Loss | 0–1 | Feb 2007 | Open Gaz de France, France | Tier II | Carpet (i) | (Czech Republic) Gabriela Navrátilová | (Zimbabwe) Cara Black (South Africa) Liezel Huber | 2–6, 0–6 |
| Loss | 0–2 | Mar 2007 | Qatar Open, Qatar | Tier II | Hard | (Hungary) Ágnes Szávay | (Switzerland) Martina Hingis (Russia) Maria Kirilenko | 1–6, 1–6 |
| Win | 1–2 | Apr 2007 | Budapest Grand Prix, Hungary | Tier IV | Clay | (Hungary) Ágnes Szávay | (Germany) Martina Müller (Czech Republic) Gabriela Navrátilová | 7–5, 6–2 |
| Loss | 1–3 | Jul 2007 | Gastein Ladies, Austria | Tier III | Clay | (Hungary) Ágnes Szávay | (Czech Republic) Lucie Hradecká (Czech Republic) Renata Voráčová | 3–6, 5–7 |
| Loss | 1–4 | Feb 2008 | Open Gaz de France, France | Tier II | Hard | (Czech Republic) Eva Hrdinová | (Ukraine) Alona Bondarenko (Ukraine) Kateryna Bondarenko | 1–6, 4–6 |
| Win | 2–4 | Apr 2008 | Amelia Island Championships, US | Tier II | Clay | (United States) Bethanie Mattek-Sands | (Belarus) Victoria Azarenka (Russia) Elena Vesnina | 6–3, 6–1 |
| Loss | 2–5 | Jul 2008 | LA Championships, US | Tier II | Hard | (Czech Republic) Eva Hrdinová | (Chinese Taipei) Chan Yung-jan (Chinese Taipei) Chuang Chia-jung | 6–2, 5–7, [4–10] |
| Win | 3–5 | Jul 2009 | Slovenia Open, Slovenia | International | Hard | (Germany) Julia Görges | (France) Camille Pin (Czech Republic) Klára Zakopalová | 6–4, 6–2 |
| Loss | 3–6 | Oct 2009 | Luxembourg Open, Luxembourg | International | Hard | (Czech Republic) Renata Voráčová | (Czech Republic) Iveta Benešová (Czech Republic) Barbora Záhlavová-Strýcová | 6–1, 0–6, [7–10] |
| Win | 4–6 | Jul 2010 | Slovenia Open, Slovenia | International | Hard | (Russia) Maria Kondratieva | (Russia) Anna Chakvetadze (New Zealand) Marina Erakovic | 6–4, 2–6, [10–7] |
| Loss | 4–7 | Jul 2010 | İstanbul Cup, Turkey | International | Hard | (Russia) Maria Kondratieva | (Greece) Eleni Daniilidou (Germany) Jasmin Wöhr | 4–6, 6–1, [9–11] |
| Loss | 4–8 | Sep 2010 | Korea Open, South Korea | International | Hard | (South Africa) Natalie Grandin | (Germany) Julia Görges (Slovenia) Polona Hercog | 3–6, 4–6 |
| Loss | 4–9 | Apr 2011 | Barcelona Open, Spain | International | Clay | (South Africa) Natalie Grandin | (Czech Republic) Iveta Benešová (Czech Republic) Barbora Záhlavová-Strýcová | 7–5, 4–6, [2–10] |
| Loss | 4–10 | May 2011 | Internationaux de Strasbourg, France | International | Clay | (South Africa) Natalie Grandin | (Uzbekistan) Akgul Amanmuradova (Chinese Taipei) Chuang Chia-jung | 7–5, 4–6, [9–11] |
| Loss | 4–11 | Jul 2011 | Budapest Grand Prix, Hungary | International | Clay | (South Africa) Natalie Grandin | (Spain) Anabel Medina Garrigues (Poland) Alicja Rosolska | 2–6, 2–6 |
| Loss | 4–12 | Aug 2011 | Cincinnati Open, United States | Premier 5 | Hard | (South Africa) Natalie Grandin | (United States) Vania King (Kazakhstan) Yaroslava Shvedova | 4–6, 6–3, [9–11] |
| Win | 5–12 | Sep 2011 | Korea Open, South Korea | International | Hard | (South Africa) Natalie Grandin | (Russia) Vera Dushevina (Kazakhstan) Galina Voskoboeva | 7–6^{(7–5)}, 6–4 |
| Loss | 5–13 | May 2012 | Internationaux de Strasbourg, France | International | Clay | (South Africa) Natalie Grandin | (Belarus) Olga Govortsova (Poland) Klaudia Jans-Ignacik | 7–6^{(7–4)}, 3–6, [3–10] |

== ITF Circuit finals ==
=== Singles: 1 runner–up ===
Legend
10K tournaments

| Result | Date | Tournament | Tier | Surface | Opponent | Score |
|---|---|---|---|---|---|---|
| Loss | Sep 2002 | ITF Winter Park, United States | 10K | Clay | (United States) Julie Ditty | 2–6, 6–4, 4–6 |

=== Doubles: 29 (17 titles, 12 runner–ups) ===
Legend
100K tournaments
75K tournaments
50K tournaments
25K tournaments
10K tournaments

| Result | W–L | Date | Tournament | Tier | Surface | Partner | Opponents | Score |
|---|---|---|---|---|---|---|---|---|
| Loss | 0–1 | Aug 2002 | ITF Koksijde, Belgium | 10K | Clay | (Czech Republic) Zuzana Černá | (Ukraine) Valeria Bondarenko (Lithuania) Edita Liachovičiūtė | 4–6, 2–6 |
| Loss | 0–2 | Nov 2002 | ITF Mallorca, Spain | 10K | Clay | (Czech Republic) Ema Janašková | (Brazil) Joana Cortez (Spain) Rosa María Andrés Rodríguez | 3–6, 1–6 |
| Win | 1–2 | Jan 2003 | ITF Tallahassee, United States | 10K | Hard | (Slovenia) Petra Rampre | (Germany) Antonia Matic (United States) Arpi Kojian | 6–2, 7–6^{(7–5)} |
| Win | 2–2 | Mar 2003 | ITF Cairo, Egypt | 10K | Clay | (Serbia and Montenegro) Daniela Berček | (Serbia and Montenegro) Borka Majstorović (Portugal) Frederica Piedade | w/o |
| Win | 3–2 | Apr 2003 | ITF Antalya, Turkey | 10K | Clay | (Czech Republic) Zuzana Černá | (Austria) Daniela Klemenschits (Austria) Sandra Klemenschits | 6–3, 6–2 |
| Loss | 3–3 | Apr 2003 | ITF Hvar, Croatia | 10K | Clay | (Turkey) İpek Şenoğlu | (Czech Republic) Jana Macurová (Czech Republic) Gabriela Chmelinová | 4–6, 6–3, 1–6 |
| Loss | 3–4 | Jul 2003 | ITF Heerhugowaard, Netherlands | 10K | Clay | (Netherlands) Kika Hogendoorn | (Netherlands) Tessy van de Ven (Netherlands) Suzanne van Hartingsveldt | 4–6, 0–2 ret. |
| Loss | 3–5 | Aug 2003 | ITF Koksijde, Belgium | 10K | Clay | (Czech Republic) Zuzana Černá | (Belgium) Elke Clijsters (Belgium) Kirsten Flipkens | 2–6, 4–6 |
| Win | 4–5 | Feb 2004 | ITF Albufeira, Portugal | 10K | Clay | (Czech Republic) Zuzana Černá | (France) Kildine Chevalier (Portugal) Frederica Piedade | 6–7^{(4–7)}, 6–4, 7–5 |
| Win | 5–5 | Apr 2004 | ITF Patras, Greece | 10K | Hard | (Germany) Martina Müller | (United Kingdom) Chantal Coombs (United Kingdom) Emily Webley-Smith | 7–6^{(9–7)}, 6–3 |
| Loss | 5–6 | Apr 2004 | ITF Bari, Italy | 25K | Clay | (Germany) Martina Müller | (Spain) Rosa María Andrés Rodríguez (Spain) Conchita Martínez Granados | 2–6, 7–5, 2–6 |
| Loss | 5–7 | May 2004 | ITF Caserta, Italy | 25K | Clay | (Italy) Giulia Casoni | (Romania) Andreea Ehritt-Vanc (Spain) Rosa María Andrés Rodríguez | 1–6, 6–4, 4–6 |
| Win | 6–7 | May 2004 | ITF Galatina, Italy | 25K | Clay | (Italy) Giulia Casoni | (Belarus) Nadejda Ostrovskaya (Germany) Kathrin Wörle | 6–4, 6–0 |
| Loss | 6–8 | Jun 2004 | ITF Fontanafredda, Italy | 25K | Clay | (Germany) Martina Müller | (Argentina) Erica Krauth (Hungary) Katalin Marosi | 6–2, 3–6, 2–6 |
| Win | 7–8 | Nov 2004 | ITF Tucson, United States | 50K | Hard | (Latvia) Līga Dekmeijere | (United States) Krysty Marcio (United States) Jessica Nguyen | 6–4, 6–4 |
| Win | 8–8 | Jan 2005 | ITF Tampa, United States | 10K | Hard | (United States) Julie Ditty | (United States) Cory Ann Avants (United States) Kristen Schlukebir | 6–1, 6–2 |
| Win | 9–8 | Jan 2005 | ITF Miami, United States | 10K | Hard | (United States) Julie Ditty | (Canada) Mélanie Marois (United States) Sarah Riske | 6–3, 2–6, 7–6^{(7–3)} |
| Win | 10–8 | Feb 2005 | ITF Rockford, United States | 25K | Hard (i) | (United States) Julie Ditty | (Canada) Joana Cortez (Bulgaria) Svetlana Krivencheva | 3–6, 7–5, 7–5 |
| Loss | 10–9 | Apr 2005 | ITF Dothan, United States | 75K | Clay | (United States) Julie Ditty | (United States) Carly Gullickson (Kazakhstan) Galina Voskoboeva | 6–4, 1–6, 2–6 |
| Win | 11–9 | Jun 2005 | Zagreb Open, Croatia | 75K | Clay | (Czech Republic) Lucie Hradecká | (Austria) Daniela Klemenschits (Austria) Sandra Klemenschits | 6–2, 6–2 |
| Win | 12–9 | Sep 2005 | ITF Denain, France | 75K | Clay | (Czech Republic) Lucie Hradecká | (Hungary) Zsófia Gubacsi (Ukraine) Mariya Koryttseva | 6–0, 7–5 |
| Win | 13–9 | Jan 2006 | ITF Fort Walton Beach, United States | 25K | Hard | (Canada) Maureen Drake | (Slovakia) Zuzana Kučová (South Africa) Chanelle Scheepers | 2–6, 6–4, 7–5 |
| Win | 14–9 | Feb 2006 | ITF Ortisei, Italy | 75K | Carpet | (Czech Republic) Lucie Hradecká | (Belarus) Tatiana Poutchek (Belarus) Anastasiya Yakimova | 6–4, 6–2 |
| Win | 15–9 | Aug 2009 | ITF Trnava, Slovak Republic | 25K | Clay | (Austria) Sandra Klemenschits | (Czech Republic) Michaela Paštiková (Czech Republic) Darina Šeděnková | 6–4, 6–2 |
| Win | 16–9 | Sep 2009 | ITF Biella, Italy | 100K | Clay | (Austria) Sandra Klemenschits | (Belarus) Darya Kustova (Czech Republic) Renata Voráčová | 4–6, 6–3, [10–6] |
| Loss | 16–10 | Nov 2009 | ITF Nantes, France | 50K | Hard (i) | (Czech Republic) Renata Voráčová | (Czech Republic) Lucie Hradecká (Czech Republic) Michaela Paštiková | 4–6, 4–6 |
| Loss | 16–11 | Dec 2009 | ITF Dubai, United Arab Emirates | 75K | Hard | (Czech Republic) Renata Voráčová | (Germany) Julia Görges (Georgia (country)) Oksana Kalashnikova | 6–4, 2–6, [8–10] |
| Loss | 16–12 | Dec 2010 | ITF Dubai, United Arab Emirates | 75K | Hard | (India) Sania Mirza | (Germany) Julia Görges (Croatia) Petra Martić | 4–6, 6–7^{(7–9)} |
| Win | 17–12 | Mar 2011 | ITF Nassau, Bahamas | 100K | Hard | (South Africa) Natalie Grandin | (United States) Raquel Atawo (United States) Abigail Spears | 6–4, 6–2 |
