= Tessy van de Ven =

Dutch tennis player

- Country (sports): Netherlands
- Born: 8 July 1983 (age 41); Woerden, Netherlands
- Prize money: $33,986

Singles
- Career record: 104–93
- Career titles: 4 ITF
- Highest ranking: No. 304 (22 November 2004)

Doubles
- Career record: 62–44
- Career titles: 5 ITF
- Highest ranking: No. 314 (3 May 2004)

Tessy van de Ven (born 8 July 1983) is a former professional tennis player from the Netherlands.

Born in Woerden, van de Ven spent her career on the ITF Circuit, playing her first tournament in 2000.

She had her best year on tour in 2004 when she won three of her four ITF singles titles and represented the Netherlands in two Fed Cup ties, partnering Anousjka van Exel in doubles rubbers against Ukraine and South Africa.

== ITF Circuit finals ==
Legend
$25,000 tournaments
$10,000 tournaments

=== Singles: 6 (4 titles, 2 runner-ups) ===
Outcome	No.	Date	Tournament	Surface	Opponent	Score
Runner-up	1.	26 January 2003	ITF Hull, United Kingdom	Hard (i)	(Germany) Anna-Lena Grönefeld	6–7^{(4)}, 3–6
Winner	2.	25 August 2003	ITF Alphen a/d Rijn, Netherlands	Clay	(Bosnia and Herzegovina) Sandra Martinović	6–3, 7–5
Runner-up	3.	28 September 2003	ITF Glasgow, United Kingdom	Hard	(Sweden) Sofia Arvidsson	6–3, 3–6, 3–6
Winner	4.	29 August 2004	ITF Alphen a/d Rijn, Netherlands	Clay	(Switzerland) Gaëlle Widmer	6–3, 6–3
Winner	5.	17 October 2004	ITF Sunderland, United Kingdom	Hard (i)	(Estonia) Margit Rüütel	4–6, 6–0, 6–3
Winner	6.	24 October 2004	ITF Bolton, United Kingdom	Hard (i)	(Republic of Ireland) Karen Nugent	6–2, 6–4

=== Doubles: 9 (5 titles, 4 runner-ups) ===
Outcome	No.	Date	Tournament	Surface	Partner	Opponents	Score
Winner	1.	22 July 2001	ITF Brussels, Belgium	Clay	(Netherlands) Suzanne van Hartingsveldt	(Ukraine) Irina Nossenko (Serbia and Montenegro) Aleksandra Vučenović	6–3, 6–4
Runner-up	2.	3 February 2002	ITF Tipton, United Kingdom	Hard (i)	(Netherlands) Suzanne van Hartingsveldt	(China) Yan Zi (China) Zheng Jie	1–6, 3–6
Runner-up	3.	24 March 2002	ITF Amiens, France	Clay (i)	(Argentina) Natalia Gussoni	(Ukraine) Yuliya Beygelzimer (Russia) Marianna Yuferova	2–6, 7–5, 2–6
Winner	4.	3 June 2002	ITF Poznań, Poland	Clay	(Netherlands) Jolanda Mens	(Argentina) Celeste Contín (Uruguay) Ana Lucía Migliarini de León	6–2, 6–2
Runner-up	5.	5 August 2002	ITF Rebecq, Belgium	Clay	(Belgium) Leslie Butkiewicz	(Belgium) Elke Clijsters (Australia) Jaslyn Hewitt	6–3, 3–6, 4–6
Runner-up	6.	29 September 2002	ITF Sunderland, United Kingdom	Hard (i)	(Netherlands) Suzanne van Hartingsveldt	(Republic of Ireland) Yvonne Doyle (Republic of Ireland) Elsa O'Riain	4–6, 4–6
Winner	7.	6 July 2003	ITF Heerhugowaard, Netherlands	Clay	(Netherlands) Suzanne van Hartingsveldt	(Netherlands) Kika Hogendoorn (Czech Republic) Vladimíra Uhlířová	6–4, 2–0 ret.
Winner	8.	25 August 2003	ITF Alphen a/d Rijn, Netherlands	Clay	(Netherlands) Suzanne van Hartingsveldt	(Netherlands) Jolanda Mens (Netherlands) Anouk Sterk	6–2, 6–2
Winner	9.	16 August 2004	ITF Enschede, Netherlands	Clay	(Netherlands) Susanne Trik	(Austria) Daniela Klemenschits (Austria) Sandra Klemenschits	4–6, 6–0, 6–4

== See also ==
- List of Netherlands Fed Cup team representatives
