= Borka Majstorović =

Serbian tennis player

- Country (sports): Yugoslavia; Serbia and Montenegro
- Born: 5 June 1983 (age 41); Ljubljana, SR Slovenia, SFR Yugoslavia
- Plays: Right-handed
- Prize money: $12,890

Singles
- Career record: 45–60
- Highest ranking: No. 424 (17 February 2003)

Doubles
- Career record: 28–37
- Highest ranking: No. 423 (29 September 2003)

Borka Majstorović Malčić (born 5 June 1983) is a Serbian former professional tennis player.

Majstorović, a Slovenian born player raised in Novi Sad, represented Yugoslavia in three Fed Cup ties in 1999, as a singles player. She reached her career best singles ranking of 424 in 2003 and finished up on tour the following year.

Now known by her married name Borka Malčić, she works as an academic in the field of pedagogy.

== ITF finals ==
=== Doubles: 3 (0–3) ===
Outcome	No.	Date	Tournament	Surface	Partner	Opponents	Score
Runner-up	1.	26 January 2003	Hull, United Kingdom	Hard	(Belgium) Elke Clijsters	(Russia) Irina Bulykina (Kazakhstan) Galina Voskoboeva	6–4, 6–7, 3–6
Runner-up	2.	23 March 2003	Cairo, Egypt	Clay	(Portugal) Frederica Piedade	(Serbia and Montenegro) Daniela Berček (Czech Republic) Vladimíra Uhlířová	W\O
Runner-up	3.	2 May 2004	Mostar, Bosnia and Herzegovina	Clay	(Croatia) Nika Ožegović	(Australia) Evie Dominikovic (Croatia) Nadja Pavić	4–6, 1–6
