= 2002 ITF Women's Circuit =

Details

Achievements (singles)

The ITF Women's Circuit is the second-tier tour for women's professional tennis organised by the International Tennis Federation, and is the tier below the WTA Tour. In 2002, the ITF Women's circuit included tournaments with prize money ranging from $10,000 to $75,000. In addition to the traditional tournament format, there were also two four-week circuits worth $40,000 each in prize money and two four-week development circuits (both held in India) each worth $20,000.

The ITF world champions in 2002 were Serena Williams (senior singles), Virginia Ruano Pascual / Paola Suárez (senior doubles), Barbora Záhlavová-Strýcová (junior singles) and Elke Clijsters (junior doubles).

== Tournament breakdown by region ==
Region	Number of events	Total prize money
Africa	10	$115,000
Asia	43	$670,000
Europe	168	$3,030,000
North America*	64	$1,690,000
Oceania	12	$225,000
South America	9	$105,000
Total	306	$5,835,000

*Includes figures for Central America and the Caribbean

== Singles titles by nation ==
Rank	Nation	Titles won
1.	United States	23
2.	Czech Republic	16
2	Spain	16
2	Germany	16
5.	France	14
5.	India	14
7.	Italy	13
7.	Ukraine	13
9.	Russia	12
10.	Argentina	11
11.	China	10
12.	Croatia	9
12.	United Kingdom	9
12.	Hungary	9
12.	Romania	9
16.	Australia	8
16.	Belgium	8
16.	Japan	8
19.	Austria	7
19.	Slovakia	7

This list displays only the top 20 nations in terms of singles titles wins.

== Sources ==
- List of ITF World Champions
- ITF prize money (1983–2008)
- ITF Pro Circuit Titles Won By Nations Players in 2002
