= Karen Nugent =

Irish tennis player (born 1976)

- Country (sports): Ireland
- Born: 29 June 1976 (age 48); Dublin
- Prize money: $26,859

Singles
- Career record: 77–92
- Career titles: 0
- Highest ranking: No. 486 (20 December 1999)

Doubles
- Career record: 100–56
- Career titles: 10 ITF
- Highest ranking: No. 211 (21 November 1994)
- Fed Cup: 20–11

Karen Nugent (born 29 June 1976) is an Irish former professional tennis player.

Playing for Ireland in Fed Cup competitions, she has a win–loss record of 20–11.

== ITF Circuit finals ==
=== Singles: 4 (4 runner-ups) ===
$25,000 tournaments
$10,000 tournaments

Result	No.	Date	Tournament	Surface	Opponent	Score
Loss	1.	Jul 1999	ITF Felixstowe, England	Grass	(New Zealand) Leanne Baker	4–6, 4–6
Loss	2.	Aug 2003	ITF Dublin, Ireland	Carpet	(New Zealand) Eden Marama	1–6, 2–6
Loss	3.	Aug 2004	ITF Dublin, Ireland	Carpet	(Australia) Dubravka Cupac	2–6, 2–6
Loss	4.	Oct 2004	ITF Bolton, England	Hard (i)	(Netherlands) Tessy van de Ven	2–6, 4–6

=== Doubles: 17 (10 titles, 7 runner-ups) ===
Result	No.	Date	Tournament	Surface	Partner	Opponents	Score
Loss	1.	Feb 1994	ITF Newcastle, England	Carpet (i)	(United Kingdom) Joanne Ward	(Netherlands) Maaike Koutstaal (Netherlands) Linda Niemantsverdriet	6–2, 5–7, 2–6
Win	2.	Aug 1994	ITF Dublin, Ireland	Clay	(United Kingdom) Kate Warne-Holland	(France) Vanina Casanova (France) Caroline Toyre	6–1, 6–4
Loss	3.	Feb 1995	ITF Sunderland, England	Hard (i)	(United Kingdom) Michele Mair	(Russia) Natalia Egorova (Russia) Svetlana Parkhomenko	5–7, 0–6
Win	4.	Jun 1995	ITF Dublin, Ireland	Clay	(Australia) Robyn Mawdsley	(Republic of Ireland) Claire Curran (Republic of Ireland) Yvonne Doyle	6–1, 4–6, 6–3
Loss	5.	Sep 1995	ITF Spoleto, Italy	Clay	(Australia) Angie Woolcock	(Italy) Cristina Salvi (Italy) Elena Savoldi	6–1, 6–7, 2–6
Win	6.	Oct 1999	ITF Glasgow, Scotland	Carpet (i)	(United Kingdom) Lizzie Jelfs	(Germany) Gréta Arn (India) Manisha Malhotra	w/o
Win	7.	Oct 1999	ITF Kastoria, Greece	Carpet	(New Zealand) Shelley Stephens	(Greece) Asimina Kaplani (Greece) Anna Koumantou	6–2, 6–2
Win	8.	Jun 2001	ITF Montemor-o-Novo, Portugal	Hard	(Republic of Ireland) Yvonne Doyle	(Spain) Vanessa Devesa (Spain) Carolina Rodríguez	6–7^{(4)}, 6–3, 6–1
Loss	9.	Jul 2001	ITF Frinton, England	Grass	(Republic of Ireland) Yvonne Doyle	(Australia) Beti Sekulovski (Australia) Sarah Stone	6–7^{(5)}, 4–6
Win	10.	Aug 2001	ITF Dublin, Ireland	Carpet	(Republic of Ireland) Yvonne Doyle	(Australia) Bree Calderwood (Australia) Emily Hewson	6–0, 6–1
Win	11.	Oct 2001	ITF Sunderland, England	Hard (i)	(Republic of Ireland) Yvonne Doyle	(United Kingdom) Cristelle Grier (United Kingdom) Anna Hawkins	4–6, 6–2, 6–1
Win	12.	Jul 2003	ITF Felixstowe, England	Grass	(Republic of Ireland) Elsa O'Riain	(New Zealand) Leanne Baker (United Kingdom) Chantal Coombs	7–6^{(7)}, 7–6^{(2)}
Loss	13.	Aug 2003	ITF Dublin, Ireland	Carpet	(Republic of Ireland) Yvonne Doyle	(New Zealand) Eden Marama (New Zealand) Paula Marama	4–6, 5–7
Win	14.	Aug 2003	ITF Wrexham, Wales	Hard	(Republic of Ireland) Yvonne Doyle	(Turkey) Pemra Özgen (Turkey) İpek Şenoğlu	6–3, 6–3
Loss	15.	Nov 2003	ITF Nottingham, England	Hard (i)	(Republic of Ireland) Yvonne Doyle	(Sweden) Helena Ejeson (Sweden) Åsa Svensson	3–6, 6–7^{(11)}
Loss	16.	Jun 2004	ITF Surbiton, England	Grass	(South Africa) Surina De Beer	(New Zealand) Leanne Baker (Australia) Nicole Sewell	6–2, 5–7, 6–7^{(6)}
Win	17.	Jul 2004	ITF Dublin, Ireland	Carpet	(Republic of Ireland) Yvonne Doyle	(South Africa) Lizaan du Plessis (United Kingdom) Rebecca Llewellyn	6–4, 3–6, 6–2
