= Yvonne Doyle (tennis) =

Irish tennis player

- Country (sports): Ireland
- Residence: Dublin, Ireland
- Born: 7 December 1974 (age 50); Dublin, Ireland
- Plays: Right-handed (two-handed backhand)
- Prize money: $39,915

Singles
- Career record: 109–90
- Career titles: 2 ITF
- Highest ranking: No. 238 (22 May 2000)

Doubles
- Career record: 77–49
- Career titles: 8 ITF
- Highest ranking: No. 202 (27 July 2003)

Team competitions
- Fed Cup: 31–18

Yvonne Doyle (born 7 December 1974) is an Irish former professional tennis player.

Playing for Ireland at the Fed Cup, Doyle has a win–loss record of 31–18.

== ITF Circuit finals ==
$50,000 tournaments
$25,000 tournaments
$10,000 tournaments

=== Singles: 4 (2 titles, 2 runner-ups) ===
Result	No.	Date	Tournament	Surface	Opponent	Score
Win	1.	7 November 1999	ITF Hull, England	Hard (i)	(United Kingdom) Julie Pullin	6–4, 7–5
Win	2.	5 August 2001	ITF Dublin, Ireland	Carpet	(Germany) Claudia Kuleszka	6–4, 6–4
Loss	1.	29 April 2002	ITF Bournemouth, England	Clay	(United Kingdom) Jane O'Donoghue	3–6, 4–6
Loss	2.	12 August 2002	ITF London, England	Hard	(United Kingdom) Anne Keothavong	4–6, 6–7^{(1)}

=== Doubles: 16 (8 titles, 8 runner-ups) ===
Result	No.	Date	Tournament	Surface	Partner	Opponents	Score
Loss	1.	5 June 1995	ITF Dublin, Ireland	Clay	(Republic of Ireland) Claire Curran	(Australia) Robyn Mawdsley (Republic of Ireland) Karen Nugent	1–6, 6–4, 3–6
Win	1.	24 June 2001	ITF Montemor-o-Novo, Portugal	Hard	(Republic of Ireland) Karen Nugent	(Spain) Vanessa Devesa (Spain) Carolina Rodríguez	6–7^{(4)}, 6–3, 6–1
Loss	2.	22 July 2001	ITF Frinton, England	Grass	(Republic of Ireland) Karen Nugent	(Australia) Beti Sekulovski (Australia) Sarah Stone	6–7^{(5)}, 4–6
Win	2.	5 August 2001	ITF Dublin, Ireland	Carpet	(Republic of Ireland) Karen Nugent	(Australia) Bree Calderwood (Australia) Emily Hewson	6–0, 6–1
Win	3.	21 September 2001	ITF Sunderland, England	Hard (i)	(Republic of Ireland) Karen Nugent	(United Kingdom) Cristelle Grier (United Kingdom) Anna Hawkins	4–6, 6–2, 6–1
Loss	3.	19 November 2001	ITF Deauville, France	Clay	(Czech Republic) Eva Erbova	(Latvia) Līga Dekmeijere (Russia) Maria Kondratieva	1–6, 6–7^{(7)}
Loss	4.	22 July 2002	ITF Pamplona, Spain	Hard (i)	(Netherlands) Susanne Trik	(United Kingdom) Elena Baltacha (Republic of Ireland) Kelly Liggan	7–6^{(6)}, 6–7^{(1)}, 3–6
Win	4.	22 September 2002	ITF Glasgow, Scotland	Hard (i)	(Republic of Ireland) Elsa O'Riain	(Australia) Sarah Stone (Australia) Samantha Stosur	6–2, 6–4
Win	5.	29 September 2002	ITF Sunderland, England	Hard (i)	(Republic of Ireland) Elsa O'Riain	(Netherlands) Tessy van de Ven (Netherlands) Suzanne van Hartingsveldt	6–4, 6–4
Loss	5.	15 October 2002	ITF Southampton, England	Hard (i)	(Latvia) Līga Dekmeijere	(Netherlands) Amanda Hopmans (Serbia and Montenegro) Dragana Zarić	2–6, 1–6
Loss	6.	1 June 2003	ITF Houston, United States	Hard (i)	(South Africa) Nicole Rencken	(Japan) Seiko Okamoto (Japan) Remi Tezuka	7–5, 4–6, 3–6
Win	6.	8 June 2003	ITF Hilton Head, United States	Hard	(South Africa) Nicole Rencken	(United States) Beau Jones (Latvia) Anžela Žguna	6–3, 7–5
Loss	7.	27 July 2003	ITF Dublin, Ireland	Carpet	(Republic of Ireland) Karen Nugent	(New Zealand) Eden Marama (New Zealand) Paula Marama	4–6, 5–7
Win	7.	10 August 2003	ITF Wrexham, Wales	Hard	(Republic of Ireland) Karen Nugent	(Turkey) Pemra Özgen (Turkey) İpek Şenoğlu	6–3, 6–3
Loss	8.	28 October 2003	ITF Nottingham, England	Hard (i)	(Republic of Ireland) Karen Nugent	(Sweden) Helena Ejeson (Sweden) Åsa Svensson	3–6, 6–7^{(11)}
Win	8.	26 July 2004	ITF Dublin, Ireland	Carpet	(Republic of Ireland) Karen Nugent	(South Africa) Lizaan du Plessis (United Kingdom) Rebecca Llewellyn	6–4, 3–6, 6–2
