= Claire Curran =

British tennis player (born 1978)

- Country (sports): United Kingdom (2005–); Ireland (–2005)
- Residence: Belfast, Northern Ireland
- Born: 10 March 1978 (age 48) Belfast, Northern Ireland
- Height: 1.73 m (5 ft 8 in)
- Turned pro: 2000
- Retired: 2007
- Plays: Right-handed
- Prize money: $62,153

Singles
- Career record: 5–14
- Career titles: 0
- Highest ranking: No. 919 (13 May 2002)

Doubles
- Career record: 124–81
- Career titles: 12 ITF
- Highest ranking: No. 89 (30 January 2006)

Grand Slam doubles results
- Wimbledon: 1R (2004, 2005, 2006, 2007)
- US Open: 1R (2000)

Grand Slam mixed doubles results
- Wimbledon: 2R (2006, 2007)

Team competitions
- Fed Cup: 20–7

Claire Curran (born 10 March 1978) is a former professional tennis player from Northern Ireland.

She represented both Great Britain and Ireland in the Fed Cup during her career. Curran is the youngest ever Irish Fed Cup player (15 years 65 days) and before attending UC Berkeley was largely focussed on singles, with the highest singles win percentage of any Irish Fed Cup player.

At UC Berkeley, Curran was an Academic All-American (Majoring in Political Science) and won the NCAA Championship.

Serious injury resulted in her decision to focus on doubles post university. Curran reached a career-high doubles ranking of world No. 89, and won a total of 12 ITF titles over the course of her career and was a finalist in one WTA Tour event and was the key doubles players in the Great British Fed Cup teams of the mid-2000s. Her overall Fed Cup record has the highest win percentage of any British or Irish player who has played in over 25 matches.

Curran retired from professional sport in 2007 following six years of professional play. Following her retirement, she was recruited by the LTA and alongside Nigel Sears coached former British No. 1, Anne Keothavong, and subsequently Laura Robson and the doubles team of Jocelyn Rae and Anna Smith.

== Career ==
=== Early years ===
Curran's tennis talent was spotted first in her native Belfast, capital of Northern Ireland. She was soon winning Ulster and all-Ireland titles and being singled out by the Irish tennis authorities for a promising amateur career on the ITF Junior Circuit.

At the age of 14, during the troubled times of Northern Ireland, beset with political and religious divisions, Curran moved to Dublin. The clubhouse where she learned to play tennis in Belfast had been destroyed by a terrorist bomb in the 1970s and she herself was frequently inconvenienced on her travels between Belfast and Dublin by bombs scares.

In Dublin, she spent her teenage years under the Irish national coaching programme of Matt Doyle. Curran travelled on the Junior Circuit, playing at junior Wimbledon in 1996. She attained a singles ranking inside the top 100 and in 1993 became the youngest person to have represented Ireland in the Fed Cup, at the age of 15 years and 3 months.

=== 1993–1996 ===
Claire played her first adult match playing doubles for Ireland in the 1993 Fed Cup where she won her two doubles rubbers against competitors from Norway and Israel. She played no other adult events this year.

In 1994 she again competed in the Fed Cup for Ireland in doubles when she and Lesley O'Halloran were defeated by doubles teams from Slovakia and Zimbabwe. This was again the only adult event Claire played this year.

One year later she again competed in the Fed Cup for Ireland. She played a more prominent role this year however by competing in both singles and doubles, winning singles matches against players from Malta, Kenya and Cyprus and also winning two doubles rubbers partnering Lesley O'Halloran. Claire played no other adult events this year.

In 1996 she was not involved in doubles in the Fed Cup but she did win singles rubbers against Malta and Iceland as well as losing one to Ukraine. Curran also made her debut on the ITF Circuit in 2006 in a $10,000 event in Dublin where she was beaten in the first round in both the singles and the doubles events (partnering Yvonne Doyle).

=== 1997–2000 ===
In 1997, Claire competed in only one event. This was the $25k tournament held in Dublin where she was beaten in the first round of the singles and the doubles.

This was again the only ITF event Curran participated in during 1998 and she again experienced first round losses in the singles and doubles competitions.

The one ITF event Curran entered in 1999 was a $10k event in Hilton Head where she won four matches in the qualifying competition before losing just one match short of qualification. She went one step further in the doubles however when she and Esther Knox qualified before losing in round one.

In 2000, Curran teamed up with Australian Amy Jensen to reach the semifinals of a $10k event in Harrisonburg, Virginia. The duo then received a wild card into the doubles competition in the US Open where they drew the formidable pairing of Martina Hingis and Mary Pierce in the first round. They gave the seeded pair a scare by taking the first set 6–4 however Hingis and Pierce came back strong to take the match, 4–6, 6–0, 6–1. She did not compete on the ITF or WTA Tour again this season.

=== 2001–2002 ===
Curran began 2001 with Teryn Ashley as her regular partner and with her she reached the semifinals of a $10k in El Paso as qualifiers. They followed this success up with a tournament win in another $10k event in Lake Ozark, Texas, a run to the semifinals of Mount Pleasant ($25k) and another run to the quarterfinals in Los Gatos, California ($50k). July saw Curran team with Kristen van Elden from Australia to reach the semifinals of Frinton ($10k) before again joining with Ashley to reach the quarterfinals of a $10k event in Bath before having to retire from the tournament. Curran and Swedish, Helena Ejeson were runners-up in a $10k in London in August and after this Curran played no more matches in 2001. She had a year-end doubles world-ranking of 375.

In January 2002, Claire reached the finals of a $10k in Hull partnering fellow Irishwoman, Elsa O'Riain. They lost to Sun Tiantian and Zheng Jie, 6–7, 5–7. Curran then partnered Amanda Augustus to reach the final in the first week of a four-week $40k circuit in Australia. They lost to Sarah Stone and Samantha Stosur before heading to the second week of this circuit and reaching the semifinals. In April, she competed in doubles for Ireland in the Fed Cup where she and O'Riain won their three doubles rubbers in the Europe/Africa Group II round robins against Egypt, Finland and Botswana. They then went on to beat a doubles team from Liechtenstein in the promotion play-offs. Curran did not compete much more this year due to problems with injuries, having to retire from a number of matches. At the end of 2002 her doubles world-ranking had fallen to 562.

=== 2003 ===
Curran teamed with O'Riain for her first four tournaments of the year (all $10k), resulting in one title and three losses in the semifinals. In the Fed Cup, she and O'Riain were beaten by doubles teams from Netherlands and Great Britain but managed a victory against Poland. Following this she teamed up with Brit, Anna Hawkins, to reach the final of a $10k in Bournemouth and then the final of a $10k in Edinburgh where the result was a walkover. Curran then went on to reach the semifinals in Dublin ($10k) and win the event in London ($10k), both partnering O'Riain. Helena Ejeson was again her partner in early September when the duo took the title in a $10k in Sunderland. Claire teamed with İpek Şenoğlu for her next five tournaments and took one title ($25k), reached two semifinals (both $25k) and two quarterfinals (one $25k and one $50k). Curran reached the quarterfinals of a $50k in Shenzhen with Tzipi Obziler in her final tournament of the year. At the end of 2003, Curran's doubles world-ranking was up to 244.

=== 2004 ===
Curran won her first three ITF event of the year and went on to reach the semifinals in her fourth, giving her a winning streak of 14 matches at the start of the season. In June, she partnered Jane O'Donoghue in the qualifying tournament for Wimbledon where they lost in the first round but were given a spot in the main draw as lucky losers where they were beaten in straight sets. In August she took the title in Lexington, Kentucky ($50k) with Natalie Grandin and the two of them were also runners up in their next event in Louisville, Kentucky and semifinalists in their next in the Bronx (both $50k). Curran and Grandin then entered the Tier III Commonwealth Bank Tennis Classic in Bali where they were beaten in the first round by Gisela Dulko and Milagros Sequera, 6–0, 6–1. In her final tournament of 2004, Curran partnered Senoglu again to reach the final of a $25k in Glasgow. Her year-end doubles world-ranking was 163.

=== 2005 ===
In February 2005, Curran partnered Kim Kilsdonk and the duo lost in the first round of the Tier-II event in Paris, the Open Gaz de France. They were beaten, 6–4, 6–3, by Iveta Benešová and Květa Peschke. Following this they headed to Antwerp to compete in the Proximus Diamond Games, another Tier-II tournament. They won two matches to qualify and then went on to beat Francesca Lubiani and Marta Marrero in the first round, 6–3, 7–6. They lost to Anabel Medina Garrigues and Dinara Safina, 4–6, 2–6, in the quarterfinals. After this she reached a number of quarterfinals and semifinals of higher-level ITF events before winning in a $50k in Saint-Gaudens (with Grandin) in May. This was followed by a run to the semifinals at the İstanbul Cup (Tier III) partnering Kim Kilsdonk where they lost, 3–6, 3–6, to Sandra and Daniela Klemenschits. June saw Curran and Grandin knocked out in the first round of the women's doubles at Wimbledon by Nadia Petrova and Meghann Shaughnessy. Curran then partnered Kilsdonk to reach the final at the $50k in Pétange before reaching three successive WTA quarterfinals: the Budapest Grand Prix (with Rika Fujiwara), the Nordic Light Open (partnering María José Martínez Sánchez) and the Commonwealth Bank Tennis Classic (with Grandin). Curran ended the year with a doubles world-ranking of 107.

=== 2006 ===
In Claire's first tournament of the year, she and Natalie Grandin teamed up to reach the quarterfinals in Auckland. Then, partnering Līga Dekmeijere, she reached the final of the Canberra International, a Tier-IV event. They were defeated by Marta Domachowska and Roberta Vinci, 7–6, 6–3. This was followed by a number of first-round losses in WTA tournaments before she competed with Elena Baltacha in the Fed Cup representing Great Britain. They won their three doubles rubbers and then also went on to win their doubles rubber in the promotion play-offs. In June she joined Shenay Perry to reach the quarterfinals of the Aegon International where they were beaten by Liezel Huber and Martina Navratilova, 6–4, 6–2. She then competed in Wimbledon with Jamea Jackson but was again beaten in the first round. She did however reach the second round of the mixed doubles with James Auckland. After Wimbledon, Claire did not compete again in 2006 and her doubles world-ranking at the end of the year was 201.

=== 2007 ===
In February 2007, Claire teamed with Anne Keothavong to win the title in London ($25k) and in March, she and Melanie South were runners-up in another $25k, this one in Las Palmas de Gran Canaria. In April, Curran again teamed with Baltacha to represent Britain in the Fed Cup. They won doubles rubbers against Luxembourg and Bulgaria but lost one against Poland and also lost one in the promotion play-offs against Sweden. In July, Curran and Keothavong took on the might of Venus and Serena Williams in the first round of Wimbledon doubles and lost, 1–6, 3–6. For the second year in a row she reached the second round of the mixed doubles with Auckland but after Wimbledon decided that her career as a professional tennis player had come to an end.

== WTA career finals ==
=== Doubles: 1 (runner-up) ===
| Result | Date | Tournament | Tier | Surface | Partnering | Opponents | Score |
|---|---|---|---|---|---|---|---|
| Loss | 13 January 2006 | Canberra International | Tier IV | Hard | (Latvia) Līga Dekmeijere | (Poland) Marta Domachowska (Italy) Roberta Vinci | 6–7^{(5)}, 3–6 |

== ITF Circuit finals ==
=== Doubles: 21 (12–9) ===
| Winner - Legend $100,000 tournaments (0–0) $75,000 tournaments (0–0) $50,000 tournaments (6–4) $25,000 tournaments (4–2) $10,000 tournaments (2–3) | Finals by surface Hard (8–5) Clay (4–3) Grass (0–1) Carpet (0–0) |

| Result | Date | Tournament | Surface | Partnering | Opponents | Score |
|---|---|---|---|---|---|---|
| Loss | 5 June 1995 | ITF Dublin, Ireland | Clay | (Republic of Ireland) Yvonne Doyle | (Australia) Robyn Mawdsley (Republic of Ireland) Karen Nugent | 1–6, 6–4, 3–6 |
| Win | 2 June 2001 | ITF Lake Ozark, United States | Hard | (United States) Teryn Ashley | (Canada) Alison Nash (United States) Andrea Nathan | 7–5, 6–1 |
| Loss | 19 August 2001 | ITF London, Great Britain | Hard | (Sweden) Helena Ejeson | (Czech Republic) Eva Erbova (France) Aurélie Védy | 6–7^{(4)}, 3–6 |
| Loss | 27 January 2002 | ITF Hull, Great Britain | Hard (i) | (Republic of Ireland) Elsa O'Riain | (China) Sun Tiantian (China) Zheng Jie | 6–7^{(4)}, 5–7 |
| Loss | 30 March 2002 | ITF Bendigo, Australia | Grass | (United States) Amanda Augustus | (Australia) Sarah Stone (Australia) Samantha Stosur | 0–6, 6–4, 3–6 |
| Win | 8 March 2003 | ITF Cairo, Egypt | Clay | (Republic of Ireland) Elsa O'Riain | (Netherlands) Marielle Hoogland (Austria) Jennifer Schmidt | 6–1, 6–4 |
| Loss | 28 April 2003 | ITF Bournemouth, Great Britain | Clay | (United Kingdom) Anna Hawkins | (Netherlands) Marielle Hoogland (Netherlands) Elise Tamaëla | 6–3, 2–6, 3–6 |
| Win | 5 May 2003 | ITF Edinburgh, Great Britain | Clay | (United Kingdom) Anna Hawkins | (Germany) Jacqueline Frohlich (Germany) Daniela Salomon | w/o |
| Win | 11 August 2003 | ITF London, Great Britain | Hard | (Republic of Ireland) Elsa O'Riain | (Russia) Irina Bulykina (Russia) Aleksandra Kulikova | 6–2, 7–6^{(5)} |
| Win | 21 September 2003 | ITF Sunderland, Great Britain | Hard (i) | (Sweden) Helena Ejeson | (Netherlands) Kim Kilsdonk (Australia) Nicole Kriz | 6–2, 6–1 |
| Win | 19 October 2003 | ITF Cardiff, Great Britain | Hard (i) | (Turkey) İpek Şenoğlu | (South Africa) Surina De Beer (New Zealand) Ilke Gers | 6–4, 2–6, 6–3 |
| Win | 25 January 2004 | ITF Hull, Great Britain | Hard (i) | (South Africa) Surina De Beer | (Russia) Anna Bastrikova (Russia) Vasilisa Davydova | 6–0, 6–4 |
| Win | 15 February 2004 | ITF Sunderland, Great Britain | Hard (i) | (Netherlands) Kim Kilsdonk | (United Kingdom) Helen Crook (Germany) Martina Müller | 6–4, 3–6, 6–3 |
| Win | 22 February 2004 | ITF Redbridge, Great Britain | Hard (i) | (Netherlands) Kim Kilsdonk | (Czech Republic) Olga Vymetálková (Czech Republic) Gabriela Navrátilová | 6–3, 3–6, 7–6^{(10)} |
| Win | 1 August 2004 | ITF Lexington, United States | Hard | (South Africa) Natalie Grandin | (Australia) Casey Dellacqua (Australia) Nicole Sewell | 7–6^{(6)}, 6–4 |
| Loss | 8 August 2004 | ITF Louisville, United States | Hard | (South Africa) Natalie Grandin | (United States) Julie Ditty (Romania) Edina Gallovits | 6–1, 4–6, 2–6 |
| Loss | 10 October 2004 | ITF Glasgow, Great Britain | Hard (i) | (Turkey) İpek Şenoğlu | (New Zealand) Leanne Baker (Italy) Francesca Lubiani | 3–6, 7–5, 4–6 |
| Win | 15 May 2005 | ITF Saint-Gaudens, France | Clay | (South Africa) Natalie Grandin | (Argentina) María José Argeri (Brazil) Letícia Sobral | 6–3, 6–1 |
| Loss | 23 July 2005 | ITF Pétange, Luxembourg | Clay | (Netherlands) Kim Kilsdonk | (Ukraine) Yuliya Beygelzimer (Germany) Sandra Klösel | 4–6, 0–6 |
| Win | 3 February 2007 | ITF Sutton, Great Britain | Hard (i) | (United Kingdom) Anne Keothavong | (Czech Republic) Andrea Hlaváčková (Slovakia) Katarina Kachliková | 4–6, 6–4, 6–2 |
| Loss | 17 March 2007 | ITF Las Palmas de Gran Canaria, Spain | Hard | (United Kingdom) Melanie South | (Romania) Sorana Cîrstea (Romania) Mădălina Gojnea | 6–4, 6–7^{(5)}, 4–6 |

== Grand Slam performance timelines ==
Key
| W | F | SF | QF | #R | RR | Q# | DNQ | A | NH |

(W) winner; (F) finalist; (SF) semifinalist; (QF) quarterfinalist; (#R) rounds 4, 3, 2, 1; (RR) round-robin stage; (Q#) qualification round; (DNQ) did not qualify; (A) absent; (NH) not held; (SR) strike rate (events won / competed); (W–L) win–loss record.

=== Doubles ===
| Tournament | 2004 | 2005 | 2006 | 2007 | W–L |
|---|---|---|---|---|---|
| Australian Open | A | A | A | A | 0–0 |
| French Open | A | A | A | A | 0–0 |
| Wimbledon | 1R | 1R | 1R | 1R | 0–4 |
| US Open | A | A | A | A | 0–0 |
| Year-end ranking | 163 | 107 | 201 | 410 | N/A |

=== Mixed doubles ===
| Tournament | 2005 | 2006 | 2007 | W–L |
|---|---|---|---|---|
| Australian Open | A | A | A | 0–0 |
| French Open | A | A | A | 0–0 |
| Wimbledon | 1R | 2R | 2R | 2–3 |
| US Open | A | A | A | 0–0 |

=== Fed Cup ===
==== For Ireland ====
Europe/Africa Group I
| Date | Venue | Surface | Round | Opponent | Final match score | Match | Opponents | Rubber score |
| 13–15 May 1993 | Nottingham, Great Britain | Hard (O) | RR | Norway | 3–0 | Doubles (with Karen Nugent) | Andersen/Instebø | 6–4, 6–4 (W) |
| 13–15 May 1993 | Nottingham, Great Britain | Hard (O) | QF | Israel | 1–2 | Doubles (with Karen Nugent) | Berger/Segal | 6–4, 7–5 (W) |
| 19–20 May 1994 | Bad Waltersdorf, Austria | Clay (O) | RR | Zimbabwe | 1–2 | Doubles (with Karen Nugent) | Black/Wagstaff | 1–6, 3–6 (L) |
| 19–20 May 1994 | Bad Waltersdorf, Austria | Clay (O) | RR | Slovenia | 0–3 | Doubles (with Lesley O'Halloran) | Križan/Lušnic | 6–4, 2–6, 5–7 (L) |
Europe/Africa Group II
| Date | Venue | Surface | Round | Opponents | Final match score | Match | Opponent | Rubber score |
| 8–13 May 1995 | Nairobi, Kenya | Clay (O) | RR | Cyprus | 3–0 | Singles | Anna Anastasiou | 6–2, 6–1 (W) |
| 8–13 May 1995 | Nairobi, Kenya | Clay (O) | RR | Cyprus | 3–0 | Doubles (with Lesley O'Halloran) | Anastasiou/Pivlava Papanikolaou | 6–1, 6–1 (W) |
| 8–13 May 1995 | Nairobi, Kenya | Clay (O) | RR | Kenya | 3–0 | Singles | Shaila Ali | 6–1, 6–2 (W) |
| 8–13 May 1995 | Nairobi, Kenya | Clay (O) | RR | Malta | 3–0 | Singles | Helen Asciak | 7–6^{(8–6)}, 6–0 (W) |
| 8–13 May 1995 | Nairobi, Kenya | Clay (O) | RR | Malta | 3–0 | Doubles (with Lesley O'Halloran) | Camenzuli/Wetz | 6–3, 6–2 (W) |
| 8–13 May 1995 | Nairobi, Kenya | Clay (O) | QF | Norway | 1–2 | Doubles (with Lesley O'Halloran) | Borgersen/Jonsson-Raaholt | W/O (W) |
| 26–28 Mar 1996 | Ramat HaSharon, Israel | Hard (O) | RR | Ukraine | 1–2 | Singles | Elena Brioukhovets | 2–6, 2–6 (L) |
| 26–28 Mar 1996 | Ramat HaSharon, Israel | Hard (O) | RR | Iceland | 3–0 | Singles | Hrafuhildur Hannesdotter | 6–0, 6–2 (W) |
| 26–28 Mar 1996 | Ramat HaSharon, Israel | Hard (O) | RR | Malta | 3–0 | Singles | Helen Asciak | 6–0, 6–2 (W) |
| 9–12 Apr 2002 | Pretoria, South Africa | Hard (O) | RR | Botswana | 3–0 | Doubles (with Yvonne Doyle) | Marobela/Mogapi | 6–0, 6–0 (W) |
| 9–12 Apr 2002 | Pretoria, South Africa | Hard (O) | RR | Finland | 3–0 | Doubles (with Yvonne Doyle) | Nieminen/Suomalainen | 6–1, 6–2 (W) |
| 9–12 Apr 2002 | Pretoria, South Africa | Hard (O) | RR | Egypt | 3–0 | Doubles (with Elsa O'Riain) | Farid/Khalil | 6–1, 6–1 (W) |
| 9–12 Apr 2002 | Pretoria, South Africa | Hard (O) | PO; Promotional | Liechtenstein | 3–0 | Doubles (with Elsa O'Riain) | Batliner/Schädler | 6–1, 6–1 (W) |
Europe/Africa Group I
| Date | Venue | Surface | Round | Opponent | Final match score | Match | Opponents | Rubber score |
| 21–24 Apr 2003 | Estoril, Portugal | Clay (O) | RR | Great Britain | 1–2 | Doubles (with Kelly Liggan) | Baltacha/Pullin | 3–6, 2–6 (L) |
| 21–24 Apr 2003 | Estoril, Portugal | Clay (O) | RR | Poland | 1–2 | Doubles (with Elsa O'Riain) | Domachowska/Bieleń-Żarska | 6–2, 6–2 (W) |
| 21–24 Apr 2003 | Estoril, Portugal | Clay (O) | RR | Netherlands | 1–2 | Doubles (with Elsa O'Riain) | Boogert/Oremans | 0–6, 0–6 (L) |

==== For Great Britain ====
Europe/Africa Group I
| Date | Venue | Surface | Round | Opponent | Final match score | Match | Opponents | Rubber score |
| 18–22 April 2006 | Plovdiv, Bulgaria | Clay (O) | RR | Ukraine | 3–0 | Doubles (with Elena Baltacha) | Antypina/V.Bondarenko | 6–4, 6–4 (W) |
| 18–22 April 2006 | Plovdiv, Bulgaria | Clay (O) | RR | Bulgaria | 2–1 | Doubles (with Elena Baltacha) | Krastevitch/Pironkova | 6–1, 1–6, 6–2 (W) |
| 18–22 April 2006 | Plovdiv, Bulgaria | Clay (O) | RR | Hungary | 2–1 | Doubles (with Elena Baltacha) | Nagy/Németh | 6–1, 7–6^{(7–5)} (W) |
| 18–22 April 2006 | Plovdiv, Bulgaria | Clay (O) | PO (1st–4th) | Slovakia | 1–2 | Doubles (with Elena Baltacha) | Cibulková/Husárová | 6–4, 6–3 (W) |
| 18–21 April 2007 | Plovdiv, Bulgaria | Clay (O) | RR | Bulgaria | 3–0 | Doubles (with Elena Baltacha) | Alawi/Mladenova | 6–4, 6–2 (W) |
| 18–21 April 2007 | Plovdiv, Bulgaria | Clay (O) | RR | Luxembourg | 1–2 | Doubles (with Elena Baltacha) | Kremer/Philippe | 6–4, 3–6, 6–3 (W) |
| 18–21 April 2007 | Plovdiv, Bulgaria | Clay (O) | RR | Poland | 0–3 | Doubles (with Elena Baltacha) | Domachowska/A.Radwańska | 3–6, 4–6 (L) |
| 18–21 April 2007 | Plovdiv, Bulgaria | Clay (O) | PO (9th–12th) | Sweden | 0–3 | Doubles (with Elena Baltacha) | Andersson/Larsson | 0–6, 1–6 (L) |
