= Helena Ejeson =

Swedish tennis player

- Full name: Helena Ejeson-Gould
- Country (sports): Sweden
- Born: 3 January 1981 (age 44); Förlösa, Kalmar, Sweden
- Plays: Right-handed
- Prize money: $18,226

Singles
- Highest ranking: No. 442 (12 August 2002)

Doubles
- Career titles: 3 ITF
- Highest ranking: No. 198 (21 July 2003)

Helena Ejeson-Gould (born 3 January 1981) is a Swedish former professional tennis player.

== Biography ==
A right-handed player from Kalmar, Ejeson played on the professional tour in the early 2000s and was most prominent in the doubles format, with a best world ranking of 198.

In 2002 she was a doubles quarter-finalist in two WTA Tour tournaments, Finland's Nordic Light Open and the Japan Open, beating Maria Sharapova/Maria Kirilenko in the latter.

Ejeson won three ITF doubles titles during her career, which included a $25,000 event in Nottingham in 2003, partnering Åsa Svensson.

Retiring in 2004, she went on to study psychology at Lund University and was married in 2010 to Alastair Gould.

== ITF finals ==
$25,000 tournaments
$10,000 tournaments

=== Doubles: 10 (3–7) ===
Result	No.	Date	Tournament	Surface	Partner	Opponents	Score
Loss	1.	29 November 1999	Mallorca, Spain	Clay	(Spain) Beatriz Cabrera Rosendo	(Czech Republic) Gabriela Chmelinová (Czech Republic) Petra Raclavská	0–6, 5–7
Loss	2.	13 August 2001	London, Great Britain	Hard	(Republic of Ireland) Claire Curran	(Czech Republic) Eva Erbová (France) Aurélie Védy	6–7^{(4–7)}, 3–6
Loss	3.	23 September 2001	Glasgow, Scotland	Hard	(Czech Republic) Eva Erbová	(Belgium) Patty Van Acker (Belgium) Leslie Butkiewicz	2–6, 2–6
Loss	4.	17 June 2002	Velp, Netherlands	Clay	(Netherlands) Kika Hogendoorn	(Austria) Sandra Klemenschits (Austria) Daniela Klemenschits	2–6, 1–6
Win	1.	10 September 2002	Hiroshima, Japan	Clay	(Denmark) Andrea Munch-Hermansen	(Japan) Keiko Taguchi (Japan) Maiko Inoue	3–6, 6–3, 6–2
Loss	5.	30 March 2003	Rabat, Morocco	Clay	(Sweden) Helena Norfeldt	(South Africa) Chanelle Scheepers (Austria) Daniela Klemenschits	3–6, 2–6
Loss	6.	7 July 2003	Toruń, Poland	Clay	(Australia) Mireille Dittmann	(Czech Republic) Zuzana Hejdová (Ukraine) Olena Antypina	3–6, 3–6
Win	2.	15 September 2003	Sunderland, Great Britain	Hard	(Republic of Ireland) Claire Curran	(Netherlands) Kim Kilsdonk (Australia) Nicole Kriz	6–2, 6–1
Win	3.	28 October 2003	Nottingham, United Kingdom	Hard	(Sweden) Åsa Svensson	(Republic of Ireland) Yvonne Doyle (Republic of Ireland) Karen Nugent	6–3, 7–6^{(13-11)}
Loss	7.	5 April 2004	Cairo, Egypt	Clay	(Germany) Annette Kolb	(Czech Republic) Simona Dobrá (Czech Republic) Hana Šromová	w/o
