= Daniela Berček =

Serbian tennis player

- Native name: Даниела Берчек
- Country (sports): Yugoslavia (2001–2003) / Serbia and Montenegro (2003–2006) / Serbia (2006–2007)
- Born: 7 July 1984 (age 41); Novi Sad, SR Serbia, SFR Yugoslavia
- Turned pro: 2001
- Retired: 2007
- Plays: Right (two-handed backhand)
- Prize money: $6,083

Singles
- Career record: 19–24
- Career titles: 0
- Highest ranking: No. 543 (25 August 2003)

Grand Slam singles results
- Australian Open Junior: 1R (2001)
- French Open Junior: 2R (2001)
- Wimbledon Junior: 1R (2001)

Doubles
- Career record: 23–17
- Career titles: 2 ITF
- Highest ranking: No. 363 (29 September 2003)

Daniela Berček (Serbian Cyrillic: Даниела Берчек, born 7 July 1984) is a Serbian former professional tennis player.

She won two doubles titles on the ITF Circuit in her career. On 25 August 2003, she reached her best singles ranking of world No. 543. On 29 September 2003, she peaked at No. 363 in the WTA doubles rankings.

Playing for FR Yugoslavia in the Fed Cup, Berček has a win–loss record of 1–1.

Novi Sad-born Berček retired from pro tour, after representing Serbia at the 2007 Summer Universiade in Bangkok.

== ITF Circuit finals ==
Legend
$25,000 tournaments
$10,000 tournaments

=== Doubles: 5 (2 titles, 3 runner-ups) ===
Result	Date	Tournament	Surface	Partner	Opponents	Score
Loss	24 June 2002	ITF Thessaloniki, Greece	Clay	(Serbia and Montenegro) Ana Četnik	(Greece) Christina Zachariadou (Slovenia) Kim Kambic	5–7, 4–6
Loss	8 July 2002	ITF İstanbul, Turkey	Clay	(Serbia and Montenegro) Ana Četnik	(Russia) Irina Kotkina (Russia) Anna Chakvetadze	5–7, 4–6
Win	23 March 2003	ITF Cairo, Egypt	Clay	(Czech Republic) Vladimíra Uhlířová	(Serbia and Montenegro) Borka Majstorović (Portugal) Frederica Piedade	w/o
Win	29 June 2003	ITF Orestiada, Greece	Hard	(Turkey) İpek Şenoğlu	(Greece) Eleftheria Makromaridou (Greece) Anna Koumantou	7–6^{(4)}, 6–2
Loss	7 July 2003	ITF Darmstadt, Germany	Clay	(Russia) Maria Goloviznina	(Croatia) Sanda Mamić (Croatia) Ana Vrljić	6–7^{(7)}, 1–6

== Fed Cup participation ==
=== Doubles ===
Edition	Date	Location	Against	Surface	Partner	Opponents	W/L	Score
2002 Fed Cup; Europe/Africa Zone I	24 April 2002	Antalya, Turkey	(Poland) Poland	Clay	(Serbia and Montenegro) Katarina Mišić	(Poland) Klaudia Jans (Poland) Joanna Sakowicz-Kostecka	L	6–2, 2–6, 1–6
2002 Fed Cup; Europe/Africa Zone I	26 April 2002	Antalya, Turkey	Luxembourg	Clay	(Serbia and Montenegro) Katarina Mišić	(Luxembourg) Céline François (Luxembourg) Mandy Minella	W	4–6, 7–6^{(4)}, 6–2
