= 2007 Bank of the West Classic – Singles =

Singles
- 2007 Bank of the West Classic

Final
- Champion: (Russia) Anna Chakvetadze
- Runner-up: (India) Sania Mirza
- Score: 6–3, 6–2

Details
- Draw: 28 (3WC/4Q)
- Seeds: 4

Events
Singles	Doubles
- Silicon Valley Classic

Kim Clijsters was the defending champion, but did not participate due to her retirement in April.

Anna Chakvetadze won the title, defeating Sania Mirza in the final 6–3, 6–2.

== Seeds ==
The top four seeds received a bye into the second round.

1. (Russia) Anna Chakvetadze (champion)
2. (France) Marion Bartoli (second round)
3. (Slovakia) Daniela Hantuchová (semifinals)
4. (Switzerland) Patty Schnyder (quarterfinals)
5. (Israel) Shahar Pe'er (second round)
6. (France) Tatiana Golovin (second round)
7. (Slovenia) Katarina Srebotnik (quarterfinals)
8. (Austria) Sybille Bammer (semifinals)

== Draw ==
Key

- Q = Qualifier
- WC = Wild card
- LL = Lucky loser
- Alt = Alternate
- ITF = ITF entry
- PR = Protected ranking
- SR = Special ranking
- SE = Special exempt
- JE = Junior exempt
- JR = Junior Accelerator Programme entrant
- CO = College Accelerator Programme entrant
- NG = Next Gen Accelerator Program entrant
- w/o = Walkover
- r = Retired
- d = Defaulted

=== Finals ===
Semifinals
1	(Russia) Anna Chakvetadze	6^{6}	6	6
3	(Slovakia) Daniela Hantuchová	7^{8}	3	2
(India) Sania Mirza	6	5	6
8	(Austria) Sybille Bammer	2	7	3

Final
1	(Russia) Anna Chakvetadze	6	6
(India) Sania Mirza	3	2

=== Top half ===
First round
WC	(United States) A Liu	6	5	1
(Greece) E Daniilidou	4	7	6
(Belarus) V Azarenka	6	5	4
(Russia) M Kirilenko	3	7	6
(Russia) O Poutchkova	3	4
7	(Slovenia) K Srebotnik	6	6
(China) S Peng	6	6
(Russia) E Bovina	3	4
Q	(Belarus) O Govortsova	6	6
WC	(Colombia) C Castaño	4	2
Q	(France) C Pin	6^{5}	2
5	(Israel) S Pe'er	7^{7}	6

Second round
1	(Russia) A Chakvetadze	6	6
(Greece) E Daniilidou	4	1
(Russia) M Kirilenko	0	6^{5}
7	(Slovenia) K Srebotnik	6	7^{7}
3	(Slovakia) D Hantuchová	6	6
(China) S Peng	4	2
Q	(Belarus) O Govortsova	4	7	6
5	(Israel) S Pe'er	6	5	2

Quarterfinals
1	(Russia) A Chakvetadze	4	6	6
7	(Slovenia) K Srebotnik	6	2	2
3	(Slovakia) D Hantuchová	7	6
Q	(Belarus) O Govortsova	5	3

Semifinals
1	(Russia) A Chakvetadze	6^{6}	6	6
3	(Slovakia) D Hantuchová	7^{8}	3	2

=== Bottom half ===
First round
6	(France) T Golovin	6	6
Q	(Ukraine) V Kutuzova	2	2
(Japan) A Morigami	6	5	6^{5}
(India) S Mirza	4	7	7^{7}
(Ukraine) J Vakulenko	6	3	2
Q	(Russia) Y Shvedova	3	6	6
8	(Austria) S Bammer	6	6
(Japan) A Sugiyama	4	2
(United States) M Tu	7^{7}	6
(United States) M Shaughnessy	6^{3}	1
WC	(United States) L Osterloh	6	7
(United States) J Craybas	2	5

Second round
6	(France) T Golovin	4	1
(India) S Mirza	6	6
Q	(Russia) Y Shvedova	5	2
4	(Switzerland) P Schnyder	7	6
8	(Austria) S Bammer	6	6
(United States) M Tu	4	2
WC	(United States) L Osterloh	5	6	6
2	(France) M Bartoli	7	4	3

Quarterfinals
(India) S Mirza	7^{7}	6
4	(Switzerland) P Schnyder	6^{2}	1
8	(Austria) S Bammer	6	6
WC	(United States) L Osterloh	2	1

Semifinals
(India) S Mirza	6	5	6
8	(Austria) S Bammer	2	7	3

== Qualifying ==
=== Qualifying seeds ===
1. (Japan) Aiko Nakamura (first round)
2. (Russia) Alla Kudryavtseva (first round)
3. (Germany) Angelique Kerber (second round)
4. (Belarus) Tatiana Poutchek (first round, withdrew)
5. (Russia) Anastasia Rodionova (second round)
6. (France) Camille Pin (qualified)
7. (Russia) Yaroslava Shvedova (qualified)
8. (Belarus) Olga Govortsova (qualified)

=== Qualifiers ===
1. (Ukraine) Viktoriya Kutuzova
2. (France) Camille Pin
3. (Russia) Yaroslava Shvedova
4. (Belarus) Olga Govortsova

=== Qualifying draw ===
==== First qualifier ====
First round
1	(Japan) Aiko Nakamura	6	3	1
(China) Yuan Meng	2	6	6
(Germany) Angelika Rösch	6	6
(Latvia) Līga Dekmeijere	2	3
(Ukraine) Viktoriya Kutuzova	6	6
WC	(South Africa) Kim Grant	1	0
WC	(United Kingdom) Ines Janbakhsh	0	2
5	(Russia) Anastasia Rodionova	6	6

Second round
(China) Yuan Meng	6	6^{4}	6
(Germany) Angelika Rösch	0	7^{7}	2
(Ukraine) Viktoriya Kutuzova	3	6	6
5	(Russia) Anastasia Rodionova	6	3	4

Qualifying competition
(China) Yuan Meng	2	6^{5}
(Ukraine) Viktoriya Kutuzova	6	7^{7}

==== Second qualifier ====
First round
2	(Russia) Alla Kudryavtseva	3	3
(Germany) Angelika Bachmann	6	6
WC	(United States) Lindsey Nelson	6	6
(Turkey) İpek Şenoğlu	3	2
(Indonesia) Romana Tedjakusuma	6	5	4
(Luxembourg) Anne Kremer	2	7	6
(Republic of Ireland) Kelly Liggan	3	4
6	(France) Camille Pin	6	6

Second round
(Germany) Angelika Bachmann	6	6
WC	(United States) Lindsey Nelson	0	3
(Luxembourg) Anne Kremer	4	4
6	(France) Camille Pin	6	6

Qualifying competition
(Germany) Angelika Bachmann	1	4
6	(France) Camille Pin	6	6

==== Third qualifier ====
First round
3	(Germany) Angelique Kerber	6	6
WC	(United States) Brie Whitehead	0	0
(Germany) Vanessa Henke	7	6
(Chinese Taipei) Hsieh Su-wei	5	3
WC	(United States) Jennifer Yen	6	6
WC	(United States) Lejla Hodzic	1	3
(Ukraine) Yuliana Fedak	4	4
7	(Russia) Yaroslava Shvedova	6	6

Second round
3	(Germany) Angelique Kerber	6	2	2
(Germany) Vanessa Henke	3	6	6
WC	(United States) Jennifer Yen	2	0
7	(Russia) Yaroslava Shvedova	6	6

Qualifying competition
(Germany) Vanessa Henke	3	6	5
7	(Russia) Yaroslava Shvedova	6	1	7

==== Fourth qualifier ====
First round
4	(Belarus) Tatiana Poutchek
(United States) Raquel Kops-Jones	w/o
WC	(United States) Anne Yelsey	6	6
WC	(United States) Mami Inoue	4	1
(United States) Alexandra Stevenson	6	6
WC	(United States) Whitney Deason	2	2
WC	(Slovakia) Janette Husárová	2	6	3
8	(Belarus) Olga Govortsova	6	2	6

Second round
(United States) Raquel Kops-Jones	6	6
WC	(United States) Anne Yelsey	2	3
(United States) Alexandra Stevenson	1	1
8	(Belarus) Olga Govortsova	6	6

Qualifying competition
(United States) Raquel Kops-Jones	3	1
8	(Belarus) Olga Govortsova	6	6
