= 2007 Bank of the West Classic – Doubles =

Doubles
- 2007 Bank of the West Classic

Final
- Champions: (India) Sania Mirza (Israel) Shahar Pe'er
- Runners-up: (Belarus) Victoria Azarenka (Russia) Anna Chakvetadze
- Score: 6–4, 7–6^{(7–5)}

Details
- Draw: 16
- Seeds: 4

Events
| Singles | Doubles |
| ← 2006 · | Bank of the West Classic | · 2008 → |

Anna-Lena Grönefeld and Shahar Pe'er were the defending champions, but Grönefeld chose not to participate. Pe'er instead played with Sania Mirza.

Mirza and Pe'er went on to win the title, defeating Victoria Azarenka and Anna Chakvetadze in the final, 6–4, 7–6^{(7–5)}.

== Seeds ==
1. (Slovenia) Katarina Srebotnik / (Japan) Ai Sugiyama (semifinals)
2. (Slovakia) Janette Husárová / (United States) Meghann Shaughnessy (first round)
3. (India) Sania Mirza / (Israel) Shahar Pe'er (champions)
4. (Greece) Eleni Daniilidou / (Russia) Maria Kirilenko (first round)

== Draw ==
=== Key ===
- Q = Qualifier
- WC = Wild card
- LL = Lucky loser
- Alt = Alternate
- SE = Special exempt
- PR = Protected ranking
- ITF = ITF entry
- JE = Junior exempt
- w/o = Walkover
- r = Retired
- d = Defaulted
- SR = Special ranking

First round
1 | (Slovenia) K Srebotnik (Japan) A Sugiyama | 6 | 6
WC | (United States) A Liu (United States) A Yelsey | 1 | 2
(Japan) A Morigami (United States) M Tu | 7 | 6
(Ukraine) Y Fedak (Germany) V Henke | 5 | 3
4 | (Greece) E Daniilidou (Russia) M Kirilenko | 7^{7} | 3 | [7]
(Belarus) V Azarenka (Russia) A Chakvetadze | 6^{5} | 6 | [10]
(Latvia) L Dekmeijere (Turkey) I Şenoğlu | 6 | 2 | [16]
(Japan) A Nakamura (France) C Pin | 1 | 6 | [18]
(Colombia) C Castaño (United States) J Craybas | 4 | 5
(Uzbekistan) A Amanmuradova (Germany) A Bachmann | 6 | 7
(Belarus) T Poutchek (Russia) A Rodionova | 1 | 6 | [9]
3 | (India) S Mirza (Israel) S Pe'er | 6 | 0 | [11]
(France) T Golovin (China) S Peng | 6 | 6
(United States) R Kops-Jones (United States) L Osterloh | 0 | 2
(Chinese Taipei) S-W Hsieh (Russia) A Kudryavtseva | 6 | 6
2 | (Slovakia) J Husárová (United States) M Shaughnessy | 2 | 2

Quarterfinals
1 | (Slovenia) K Srebotnik (Japan) A Sugiyama | 6 | 6
(Japan) A Morigami (United States) M Tu | 1 | 3
(Belarus) V Azarenka (Russia) A Chakvetadze | 7^{7} | 6
(Japan) A Nakamura (France) C Pin | 6^{0} | 2
(Uzbekistan) A Amanmuradova (Germany) A Bachmann | 7 | 3 | [6]
3 | (India) S Mirza (Israel) S Pe'er | 5 | 6 | [10]
(France) T Golovin (China) S Peng | 6^{5} | 4
(Chinese Taipei) S-W Hsieh (Russia) A Kudryavtseva | 7^{7} | 6

Semifinals
1 | (Slovenia) K Srebotnik (Japan) A Sugiyama | 4 | 7 | [7]
(Belarus) V Azarenka (Russia) A Chakvetadze | 6 | 5 | [10]
3 | (India) S Mirza (Israel) S Pe'er | 6 | 6
(Chinese Taipei) S-W Hsieh (Russia) A Kudryavtseva | 3 | 4

Final
(Belarus) V Azarenka (Russia) A Chakvetadze | 4 | 6^{5}
3 | (India) S Mirza (Israel) S Pe'er | 6 | 7^{7}
