= 2006 Bank of the West Classic =

- Date: July 24–30
- Edition: 35th
- Category: Tier II Series
- Draw: 28S / 16D
- Surface: Hard / outdoors
- Venue: Taube Tennis Center

Champions

Singles
- (Belgium) Kim Clijsters

Doubles
- (Germany) Anna-Lena Grönefeld / (Israel) Shahar Pe'er
← 2005 ·	Stanford Classic	· 2007 →

The 2006 Bank of the West Classic was a women's tennis tournament played on outdoor hard courts. It was part of the Tier II Series of the 2006 WTA Tour. It took place at the Taube Tennis Center in Stanford, California, United States, from July 24 through July 30, 2006.

== Finals ==
=== Singles ===
(Belgium) Kim Clijsters defeated (Switzerland) Patty Schnyder, 6–4, 6–2

- It was Clijsters's 2nd title of the year, and her 32nd overall.

=== Doubles ===
(Germany) Anna-Lena Grönefeld / (Israel) Shahar Pe'er defeated (Italy) Maria Elena Camerin / (Argentina) Gisela Dulko, 6–1, 6–4
