= 2004 Bank of the West Classic – Singles =

Singles
- 2004 Bank of the West Classic

Final
- Champion: (United States) Lindsay Davenport
- Runner-up: (United States) Venus Williams
- Score: 7–6^{(7–4)}, 5–7, 7–6^{(7–4)}

Details
- Draw: 28
- Seeds: 8

Events
Singles	Doubles
- Bank of the West Classic

Kim Clijsters was the defending champion, but did not compete this year due to a recovery from a surgery.

Lindsay Davenport won the title, defeating Venus Williams 7–6^{(7–4)}, 5–7, 7–6^{(7–4)} in the final.

== Seeds ==
The first four seeds received a bye into the second round.

1. (United States) Venus Williams (final)
2. (United States) Lindsay Davenport (champion)
3. (Switzerland) Patty Schnyder (quarterfinals)
4. (Italy) Francesca Schiavone (quarterfinals)
5. (Israel) Anna Smashnova-Pistolesi (quarterfinals)
6. (United States) Amy Frazier (semifinals)
7. (United States) Meghann Shaughnessy (first round)
8. (Venezuela) María Vento-Kabchi (semifinals)

== Draw ==
Key

- Q = Qualifier
- WC = Wild card
- LL = Lucky loser
- Alt = Alternate
- ITF = ITF entry
- PR = Protected ranking
- SR = Special ranking
- SE = Special exempt
- JE = Junior exempt
- JR = Junior Accelerator Programme entrant
- CO = College Accelerator Programme entrant
- NG = Next Gen Accelerator Program entrant
- w/o = Walkover
- r = Retired
- d = Defaulted

=== Finals ===
Semifinals
1/PR	(United States) Venus Williams	6	6
6	(United States) Amy Frazier	3	1
8	(Venezuela) María Vento-Kabchi	3	2
2	(United States) Lindsay Davenport	6	6

Final
1/PR	(United States) Venus Williams	6^{4}	7	6^{4}
2	(United States) Lindsay Davenport	7^{7}	5	7^{7}

=== Top half ===
First round
WC	(United States) A Haynes	2	4
(United States) L Lee-Waters	6	6
(Russia) A Jidkova	2	1
(Spain) A Parra Santonja	6	6
Q	(United States) J Jackson	1	6	6^{3}
5	(Israel) A Smashnova-Pistolesi	6	0	7^{7}
(Australia) N Pratt	6	6
(Serbia and Montenegro) J Janković	4	3
(Russia) E Likhovtseva	1	4
(France) M Bartoli	6	6
WC	(United States) A Liu	5	6	3
6	(United States) A Frazier	7	4	6

Second round
1/PR	(United States) V Williams	6	6
(United States) L Lee-Waters	1	1
(Spain) A Parra Santonja	6	5	2
5	(Israel) A Smashnova-Pistolesi	3	7	6
3	(Switzerland) P Schnyder	6	6
(Australia) N Pratt	3	2
(France) M Bartoli	3	6^{0}
6	(United States) A Frazier	6	7^{7}

Quarterfinals
1/PR	(United States) V Williams	6	6
5	(Israel) A Smashnova-Pistolesi	0	3
3	(Switzerland) P Schnyder	3	6^{4}
6	(United States) A Frazier	6	7^{7}

Semifinals
1/PR	(United States) V Williams	6	6
6	(United States) A Frazier	3	1

=== Bottom half ===
First round
8	(Venezuela) M Vento-Kabchi	6	6^{6}	7^{8}
(Greece) E Daniilidou	3	7^{8}	6^{6}
(Czech Republic) I Benešová	6^{3}	6	4
(Germany) A Barna	7^{7}	4	6
Q	(United States) A Harkleroad	5	6	1
(Croatia) J Kostanić	7	4	6
7	(United States) M Shaughnessy	3	1
Q	(United States) M Irvin	6	6
LL	(United States) M Washington	7	6
(Luxembourg) C Schaul	5	1
(Hungary) P Mandula	6	2	3
Q	(Russia) Lioudmila Skavronskaia	3	6	6

Second round
8	(Venezuela) M Vento-Kabchi	6	6
(Germany) A Barna	2	2
(Croatia) J Kostanić	4	6	6^{2}
4	(Italy) F Schiavone	6	3	7^{7}
Q	(United States) M Irvin	1	6	3
LL	(United States) M Washington	6	3	6
Q	(Russia) L Skavronskaia	1	1
2	(United States) L Davenport	6	6

Quarterfinals
8	(Venezuela) M Vento-Kabchi	6	6
4	(Italy) F Schiavone	4	1
LL	(United States) M Washington	4	6	1
2	(United States) L Davenport	6	3	6

Semifinals
8	(Venezuela) M Vento-Kabchi	3	2
2	(United States) L Davenport	6	6
