= 2008 Bank of the West Classic =

- Date: July 14–20
- Edition: 37th
- Category: Tier II Series
- Location: Stanford, California, US
- Venue: Taube Tennis Center

Champions

Singles
- (Canada) Aleksandra Wozniak

Doubles
- (Zimbabwe) Cara Black / (United States) Liezel Huber
- Stanford Classic

The 2008 Bank of the West Classic was a women's tennis tournament played on outdoor hard courts. It was the 37th edition of the Bank of the West Classic, and was part of the Tier II Series of the 2008 WTA Tour. It took place at the Taube Tennis Center in Stanford, California, United States, from July 14 through July 20, 2008. Aleksandra Wozniak won the singles title, the only WTA title of her career.

== Finals ==
=== Singles ===
(Canada) Aleksandra Wozniak defeated (France) Marion Bartoli, 7–5, 6–3

- It was Aleksandra Wozniak's 1st career title.

=== Doubles ===
(Zimbabwe) Cara Black / (United States) Liezel Huber defeated (Russia) Elena Vesnina / (Russia) Vera Zvonareva, 6–4, 6–3
