= 2004 Bank of the West Classic =

- Date: July 12–18
- Edition: 33rd
- Category: Tier II Series
- Draw: 28S / 16D
- Prize money: $585,000
- Surface: Hard / outdoor
- Location: Stanford, California, U.S.
- Venue: Taube Tennis Center

Champions

Singles
- (United States) Lindsay Davenport

Doubles
- (Greece) Eleni Daniilidou / (Australia) Nicole Pratt
← 2003 ·	Stanford Classic	· 2005 →

The 2004 Bank of the West Classic was a women's tennis tournament played on outdoor hard courts that was part of the Tier II Series of the 2004 WTA Tour. It was the 33rd edition of the tournament and took place at the Taube Tennis Center in Stanford, California, United States, from July 12 through July 18, 2004. Second-seeded Lindsay Davenport won the singles title, her third at the event after 1998 and 1999, and earned $ 93,000 first-prize money.

== Finals ==
=== Singles ===
(United States) Lindsay Davenport defeated. (United States) Venus Williams, 7–6^{(7–4)}, 5–7, 7–6^{(7–4)}

=== Doubles ===
(Greece) Eleni Daniilidou / (Australia) Nicole Pratt defeated (Czech Republic) Iveta Benešová / (Luxembourg) Claudine Schaul, 6–2, 6–4
