= 2003 Bank of the West Classic – Singles =

Singles
- 2003 Bank of the West Classic

Final
- Champion: (Belgium) Kim Clijsters
- Runner-up: (United States) Jennifer Capriati
- Score: 4–6, 6–4, 6–2

Details
- Draw: 28 (2WC/4Q/2LL)
- Seeds: 8

Events
Singles	Doubles
- Silicon Valley Classic

Venus Williams was the defending champion, but did not compete this year.

Kim Clijsters won the title by defeating Jennifer Capriati 4–6, 6–4, 6–2 in the final.

== Seeds ==
The first five seeds received a bye into the second round.

1. (United States) ~~Serena Williams~~ (withdrew due to a left knee pain)
2. (Belgium) Kim Clijsters (champion)
3. (United States) Jennifer Capriati (final)
4. (Slovakia) Daniela Hantuchová (second round)
5. (Federal Republic of Yugoslavia) Jelena Dokic (quarterfinals)
6. (United States) Meghann Shaughnessy (second round)
7. (Greece) Eleni Daniilidou (second round)
8. (Russia) Nadia Petrova (first round)
9. (United States) Lisa Raymond (quarterfinals)

== Draw ==
Key

- Q = Qualifier
- WC = Wild card
- LL = Lucky loser
- Alt = Alternate
- ITF = ITF entry
- PR = Protected ranking
- SR = Special ranking
- SE = Special exempt
- JE = Junior exempt
- JR = Junior Accelerator Programme entrant
- CO = College Accelerator Programme entrant
- NG = Next Gen Accelerator Program entrant
- w/o = Walkover
- r = Retired
- d = Defaulted

=== Finals ===
Semifinals
3	(United States) Jennifer Capriati	6	6
Q	(Venezuela) María Vento-Kabchi	4	4
(Italy) Francesca Schiavone	3	2
2	(Belgium) Kim Clijsters	6	6

Final
3	(United States) Jennifer Capriati	6	4	2
2	(Belgium) Kim Clijsters	4	6	6

=== Top half ===
First round
(France) M Bartoli	6	4	6
(United States) L Granville	4	6	3
(Italy) R Grande	3	4
Q	(United States) A Haynes	6	6
(South Korea) Y-j Cho	5	7	1
9	(United States) L Raymond	7	5	6
(United States) A Stevenson	6^{5}	6	6
Q	(United States) T Ashley	7^{7}	3	1
LL	(Russia) A Jidkova	6	6
(United States) S Taylor	1	4
Q	(Venezuela) M Vento-Kabchi	6	7^{7}
8	(Russia) N Petrova	1	6^{4}

Second round
3	(United States) J Capriati	6	4	6
(France) M Bartoli	2	6	1
Q	(United States) A Haynes	4	2
9	(United States) L Raymond	6	6
5	(Federal Republic of Yugoslavia) J Dokic	6	6
(United States) A Stevenson	3	2
LL	(Russia) A Jidkova	1	3
Q	(Venezuela) M Vento-Kabchi	6	6

Quarterfinals
3	(United States) J Capriati	6	6^{5}	6
9	(United States) L Raymond	1	7^{7}	4
5	(Federal Republic of Yugoslavia) J Dokic	4	3
Q	(Venezuela) M Vento-Kabchi	6	6

Semifinals
3	(United States) J Capriati	6	6
Q	(Venezuela) M Vento-Kabchi	4	4

=== Bottom half ===
First round
7	(Greece) E Daniilidou	6	6
(Slovenia) T Pisnik	1	2
(United States) J Craybas	3	1
(Italy) F Schiavone	6	6
(Zimbabwe) C Black	3	6	1
(United States) A Frazier	6	2	6
6	(United States) M Shaughnessy	6	6
WC	(Federal Republic of Yugoslavia) J Janković	3	1
LL	(Ukraine) J Vakulenko	1	2
(Switzerland) MG Mikaelian	6	6
Q	(United States) T Snyder	6	3	2
WC	(United States) A Liu	2	6	6

Second round
7	(Greece) E Daniilidou	3	2
(Italy) F Schiavone	6	6
(United States) A Frazier	6	6
4	(Slovakia) D Hantuchová	2	4
6	(United States) M Shaughnessy	6	6^{4}	4
(Switzerland) MG Mikaelian	3	7^{7}	6
WC	(United States) A Liu	1	1
2	(Belgium) K Clijsters	6	6

Quarterfinals
(Italy) F Schiavone	7^{7}	6
(United States) A Frazier	6^{5}	3
(Switzerland) MG Mikaelian	6	0	1
2	(Belgium) K Clijsters	4	6	6

Semifinals
(Italy) F Schiavone	3	2
2	(Belgium) K Clijsters	6	6
