= 2008 Bank of the West Classic – Singles =

Singles
- 2008 Bank of the West Classic

Final
- Champion: (Canada) Aleksandra Wozniak
- Runner-up: (France) Marion Bartoli
- Score: 7–5, 6–3

Details
- Draw: 28
- Seeds: 8

Events
Singles	Doubles
- Bank of the West Classic

Anna Chakvetadze was the defending champion, but lost in the quarterfinals to Marion Bartoli.

Aleksandra Wozniak won her first and only WTA tour title, defeating Bartoli in the final 7–5, 6–3.

== Seeds ==
The top four seeds received a bye into the second round.

1. (United States) Serena Williams (semifinals)
2. (Russia) Anna Chakvetadze (quarterfinals)
3. (Russia) Vera Zvonareva (second round)
4. (Slovakia) Daniela Hantuchová (second round)
5. (Switzerland) Patty Schnyder (quarterfinals)
6. (France) Marion Bartoli (final)
7. (Russia) Nadia Petrova (first round)
8. (Italy) Francesca Schiavone (first round)

== Draw ==
Key

- Q = Qualifier
- WC = Wild card
- LL = Lucky loser
- Alt = Alternate
- ITF = ITF entry
- PR = Protected ranking
- SR = Special ranking
- SE = Special exempt
- JE = Junior exempt
- JR = Junior Accelerator Programme entrant
- CO = College Accelerator Programme entrant
- NG = Next Gen Accelerator Program entrant
- w/o = Walkover
- r = Retired
- d = Defaulted

=== Finals ===
Semifinals
1	(United States) Serena Williams	2	1^{r}
Q	(Canada) Aleksandra Wozniak	6	3
(Japan) Ai Sugiyama	3	3
6	(France) Marion Bartoli	6	6

Final
Q	(Canada) Aleksandra Wozniak	7	6
6	(France) Marion Bartoli	5	3

=== Top half ===
First round
Q	(Portugal) M Larcher de Brito	7	7^{7}
(Argentina) G Dulko	5	6^{1}
(Russia) E Vesnina	6	2	3
(Russia) A Kleybanova	4	6	6
WC	(United States) A Liu	1	1
5	(Switzerland) P Schnyder	6	6
(Russia) A Rodionova	3	1
LL	(Australia) S Stosur	6	6
(Austria) S Bammer	7	6
(Belarus) O Govortsova	5	2
Q	(Canada) A Wozniak	2	6	6
8	(Italy) F Schiavone	6	3	2

Second round
1	(United States) S Williams	4	6	6
Q	(Portugal) M Larcher de Brito	6	3	2
(Russia) A Kleybanova	6^{8}	4
5	(Switzerland) P Schnyder	7^{10}	6
3	(Russia) V Zvonareva	3	2
LL	(Australia) S Stosur	6	6
(Austria) S Bammer	4	5
Q	(Canada) A Wozniak	6	7

Quarterfinals
1	(United States) S Williams	6	6
5	(Switzerland) P Schnyder	3	1
LL	(Australia) S Stosur	2	7	4
Q	(Canada) A Wozniak	6	5	6

Semifinals
1	(United States) S Williams	2	1^{r}
Q	(Canada) A Wozniak	6	3

=== Bottom half ===
First round
7	(Russia) N Petrova	4	6	3
(Slovakia) D Cibulková	6	3	6
(Ukraine) K Bondarenko	7	6
(United States) A Harkleroad	5	2
(Japan) A Sugiyama	6	3	7
WC	(United States) A Glatch	2	6	5
6	(France) M Bartoli	6	6
(Uzbekistan) A Amanmuradova	1	3
(India) S Mirza	6^{4}	1
Q	(United Kingdom) A Keothavong	7^{7}	6
(Israel) S Pe'er	7	6
Q	(Hungary) M Czink	5	0

Second round
(Slovakia) D Cibulková	6	6
(Ukraine) K Bondarenko	2	3
(Japan) A Sugiyama	6	6
4	(Slovakia) D Hantuchová	3	1
6	(France) M Bartoli	6	1	7
Q	(United Kingdom) A Keothavong	3	6	5
(Israel) S Pe'er	3	4
2	(Russia) A Chakvetadze	6	6

Quarterfinals
(Slovakia) D Cibulková	7^{7}	6^{5}	3^{r}
(Japan) A Sugiyama	6^{4}	7^{7}	5
6	(France) M Bartoli	6	6
2	(Russia) A Chakvetadze	3	4

Semifinals
(Japan) A Sugiyama	3	3
6	(France) M Bartoli	6	6
