= 2006 Bank of the West Classic – Singles =

Singles
- 2006 Bank of the West Classic

Final
- Champion: (Belgium) Kim Clijsters
- Runner-up: (Switzerland) Patty Schnyder
- Score: 6–4, 6–2

Details
- Draw: 28
- Seeds: 8

Events
Singles	Doubles
- Bank of the West Classic

Kim Clijsters was the reigning champion, and successfully defended her title, defeating Patty Schnyder in the final 6–4, 6–2.

== Seeds ==
The top four seeds received a bye into the second round.

1. (Belgium) Kim Clijsters (champion)
2. (Switzerland) Patty Schnyder (finals)
3. (Czech Republic) Nicole Vaidišová (semifinals)
4. (Germany) Anna-Lena Grönefeld (quarterfinals)
5. (Slovakia) Daniela Hantuchová (first round)
6. (Japan) Ai Sugiyama (second round)
7. (Israel) Shahar Pe'er (second round)
8. (Slovenia) Katarina Srebotnik (first round)

== Draw ==
Key

- Q = Qualifier
- WC = Wild card
- LL = Lucky loser
- Alt = Alternate
- ITF = ITF entry
- PR = Protected ranking
- SR = Special ranking
- SE = Special exempt
- JE = Junior exempt
- JR = Junior Accelerator Programme entrant
- CO = College Accelerator Programme entrant
- NG = Next Gen Accelerator Program entrant
- w/o = Walkover
- r = Retired
- d = Defaulted

=== Finals ===
Semifinals
1	(Belgium) Kim Clijsters	7	6
3	(Czech Republic) Nicole Vaidišová	5	2
(France) Tatiana Golovin	6^{4}	1
2	(Switzerland) Patty Schnyder	7^{7}	6

Final
1	(Belgium) Kim Clijsters	6	6
2	(Switzerland) Patty Schnyder	4	2

=== Top half ===
First round
(Serbia and Montenegro) J Janković	7	6
WC	(United States) L Osterloh	5	3
(Italy) ME Camerin	6	6^{6}	3
(France) N Dechy	0	7^{8}	6
WC	(Russia) V Zvonareva	6	6
8	(Slovenia) K Srebotnik	4	3
(France) M Bartoli	3	7	4
(Austria) S Bammer	6	5	6
Q	(Ukraine) O Savchuk	1	3
(Australia) S Stosur	6	6
WC	(United States) A Liu	6	1	0
7	(Israel) S Pe'er	4	6	6

Second round
1	(Belgium) K Clijsters	5	6	6
(Serbia and Montenegro) J Janković	7	2	2
(France) N Dechy	6^{5}	0
WC	(Russia) V Zvonareva	7^{7}	6
3	(Czech Republic) N Vaidišová	6	6
(Austria) S Bammer	1	4
(Australia) S Stosur	7	6
7	(Israel) S Pe'er	5	3

Quarterfinals
1	(Belgium) K Clijsters	6	3	6
WC	(Russia) V Zvonareva	2	6	1
3	(Czech Republic) N Vaidišová	6	6
(Australia) S Stosur	4	2

Semifinals
1	(Belgium) K Clijsters	7	6
3	(Czech Republic) N Vaidišová	5	2

=== Bottom half ===
First round
6	(Japan) A Sugiyama	6	6
(Czech Republic) K Peschke	3	4
(France) T Golovin	7	6
(Ukraine) A Bondarenko	5	2
Q	(Russia) V Bardina	6	6
(India) S Mirza	3	2
5	(Slovakia) D Hantuchová	2	6	3
Q	(United States) S Perry	6	0	6
(United States) J Craybas	6	6
PR	(United States) C Rubin	2	3
(Argentina) G Dulko	0	3
Q	(Japan) A Morigami	6	6

Second round
6	(Japan) A Sugiyama	2	3
(France) T Golovin	6	6
Q	(Russia) V Bardina	3	5
4	(Germany) A-L Grönefeld	6	7
Q	(United States) S Perry	3	6	6^{2}
(United States) J Craybas	6	3	7^{7}
Q	(Japan) A Morigami	1	4
2	(Switzerland) P Schnyder	6	6

Quarterfinals
(France) T Golovin	6	7^{7}
4	(Germany) A-L Grönefeld	4	6^{5}
(United States) J Craybas	4	5
2	(Switzerland) P Schnyder	6	7

Semifinals
(France) T Golovin	6^{4}	1
2	(Switzerland) P Schnyder	7^{7}	6
