= 2003 Bank of the West Classic =

- Date: July 21–27
- Edition: 32nd
- Category: Tier II Series
- Draw: 28S / 16D
- Prize money: US$635,000
- Surface: Hard / outdoor
- Location: Stanford, California, U.S.
- Venue: Taube Tennis Center

Champions

Singles
- (Belgium) Kim Clijsters

Doubles
- (Zimbabwe) Cara Black / (United States) Lisa Raymond
| ← 2002 · | Stanford Classic | · 2004 → |

The 2003 Bank of the West Classic was a women's tennis tournament played on outdoor hard courts that was part of the Tier II Series of the 2003 WTA Tour. It was the 32nd edition of the tournament and took place at the Taube Tennis Center in Stanford, California, United States, from July 21 through July 27, 2003. Second-seeded Kim Clijsters won the singles title, her second at the event after 2001, and earned $ 97,000 first-prize money.

== Finals ==
=== Singles ===
(Belgium) Kim Clijsters defeated. (United States) Jennifer Capriati, 4–6, 6–4, 6–2

- It was Clijsters' 5th singles title of the year and the 15th of her career.

=== Doubles ===
(Zimbabwe) Cara Black / (United States) Lisa Raymond defeated (South Korea) Cho Yoon-jeong / (Italy) Francesca Schiavone, 7–6^{(7–5)}, 6–1
