= 2005 Bank of the West Classic – Singles =

Singles
- 2005 Bank of the West Classic

Final
- Champion: (Belgium) Kim Clijsters
- Runner-up: (United States) Venus Williams
- Score: 7–5, 6–2

Details
- Draw: 28
- Seeds: 8

Events
| Singles | Doubles |
- Bank of the West Classic

Lindsay Davenport was the defending champion, but retired in the second round against Anna-Lena Grönefeld due to a low back strain.

Kim Clijsters won the title without losing a set throughout the tournament by defeating Venus Williams in the final. Williams reached the final after being five match points down against Patty Schnyder in the second set in the semifinals.

== Seeds ==
The first four seeds received a bye into the second round.

1. (United States) Lindsay Davenport (second round, retired due to a low back strain)
2. (United States) Venus Williams (final)
3. (Switzerland) Patty Schnyder (semifinals)
4. (Belgium) Kim Clijsters (champion)
5. (Russia) Vera Zvonareva (first round)
6. (France) Nathalie Dechy (quarterfinals)
7. (Serbia and Montenegro) Jelena Janković (quarterfinals)
8. (Italy) Francesca Schiavone (second round)

== Draw ==
Key

- Q = Qualifier
- WC = Wild card
- LL = Lucky loser
- Alt = Alternate
- ITF = ITF entry
- PR = Protected ranking
- SR = Special ranking
- SE = Special exempt
- JE = Junior exempt
- JR = Junior Accelerator Programme entrant
- CO = College Accelerator Programme entrant
- NG = Next Gen Accelerator Program entrant
- w/o = Walkover
- r = Retired
- d = Defaulted

=== Finals ===
Semifinals
(Germany) Anna-Lena Grönefeld | 4 | 0
4 | (Belgium) Kim Clijsters | 6 | 6
3 | (Switzerland) Patty Schnyder | 6 | 6^{4} | 2
2 | (United States) Venus Williams | 2 | 7^{7} | 6

Final
4 | (Belgium) Kim Clijsters | 7 | 6
2 | (United States) Venus Williams | 5 | 2

=== Top half ===
First round
Q | (Israel) S Pe'er | 5 | 1
(Germany) A-L Grönefeld | 7 | 6
(United States) L Raymond | 6 | 7^{9}
WC | (United States) A Haynes | 4 | 6^{7}
(Croatia) K Šprem | 2 | 3
6 | (France) N Dechy | 6 | 6
(Japan) A Sugiyama | 7^{12} | 6
(Australia) S Stosur | 6^{10} | 2
WC | (United States) A Stevenson | 2 | 1
(Slovakia) D Hantuchová | 6 | 6
Q | (United States) M Shaughnessy | 6 | 1 | 7^{8}
5 | (Russia) V Zvonareva | 3 | 6 | 6^{6}

Second round
1 | (United States) L Davenport | 0^{r}
(Germany) A-L Grönefeld | 5
(United States) L Raymond | 6 | 3 | 4
6 | (France) N Dechy | 3 | 6 | 6
4 | (Belgium) K Clijsters | 6 | 6
(Japan) A Sugiyama | 1 | 2
(Slovakia) D Hantuchová | 6 | 3 | 6
Q | (United States) M Shaughnessy | 4 | 6 | 1

Quarterfinals
(Germany) A-L Grönefeld | 2 | 6 | 6
6 | (France) N Dechy | 6 | 2 | 3
4 | (Belgium) K Clijsters | 6 | 6
(Slovakia) D Hantuchová | 3 | 1

Semifinals
(Germany) A-L Grönefeld | 4 | 0
4 | (Belgium) K Clijsters | 6 | 6

=== Bottom half ===
First round
8 | (Italy) F Schiavone | 6 | 6
Q | (Russia) A Jidkova | 4 | 1
(China) S Peng | 4 | 6^{3}
(Czech Republic) I Benešová | 6 | 7^{7}
(United States) M Washington | 1 | 3
(France) M Bartoli | 6 | 6
7 | (Serbia and Montenegro) J Janković | 6 | 6
Q | (United States) M Irvin | 2 | 4
(Venezuela) M Vento-Kabchi | 3 | 0
(United States) A Frazier | 6 | 6
WC | (Greece) E Daniilidou | 6^{4} | 6 | 3
LL | (India) S Mirza | 7^{7} | 2 | 6

Second round
8 | (Italy) F Schiavone | 6 | 3 | 6^{4}
(Czech Republic) I Benešová | 3 | 6 | 7^{7}
(France) M Bartoli | 4 | 5
3 | (Switzerland) P Schnyder | 6 | 7
7 | (Serbia and Montenegro) J Janković | 6 | 6
(United States) A Frazier | 0 | 3
LL | (India) S Mirza | 3 | 2
2 | (United States) V Williams | 6 | 6

Quarterfinals
(Czech Republic) I Benešová | 2 | 1
3 | (Switzerland) P Schnyder | 6 | 6
7 | (Serbia and Montenegro) J Janković | 3 | 3
2 | (United States) V Williams | 6 | 6

Semifinals
3 | (Switzerland) P Schnyder | 6 | 6^{4} | 2
2 | (United States) V Williams | 2 | 7^{7} | 6
