= 2005 Bank of the West Classic =

- Date: July 25–31
- Edition: 34th
- Category: Tier II Series
- Surface: Hard / outdoor
- Location: Stanford, California, U.S.
- Venue: Taube Tennis Center

Champions

Singles
- (Belgium) Kim Clijsters

Doubles
- (Zimbabwe) Cara Black / (Australia) Rennae Stubbs
← 2004 ·	Stanford Classic	· 2006 →

The 2005 Bank of the West Classic was a women's tennis tournament played on outdoor hard courts. It was part of the Tier II Series of the 2005 WTA Tour. It was the 34th edition of the tournament and took place at the Taube Tennis Center in Stanford, California, United States, from July 25 through July 31, 2005.

== Finals ==
=== Singles ===
(Belgium) Kim Clijsters defeated (United States) Venus Williams 7–5, 6–2

=== Doubles ===
(Zimbabwe) Cara Black / (Australia) Rennae Stubbs defeated (Russia) Elena Likhovtseva / (Russia) Vera Zvonareva 6–3, 7–5
