= 2004 Bank of the West Classic – Doubles =

Doubles
- 2004 Bank of the West Classic

Final
- Champions: (Greece) Eleni Daniilidou (Australia) Nicole Pratt
- Runners-up: (Czech Republic) Iveta Benešová (Luxembourg) Claudine Schaul
- Score: 6–2, 6–4

Details
- Draw: 16
- Seeds: 4

Events
Singles	Doubles
← 2003 ·	Bank of the West Classic	· 2005 →

Cara Black and Lisa Raymond were the defending champions, but did not compete this year.

Eleni Daniilidou and Nicole Pratt won the title, defeating Iveta Benešová and Claudine Schaul 6–2, 6–4 in the final.

== Seeds ==
1. (United States) Meilen Tu / (Venezuela) María Vento-Kabchi (quarterfinals)
2. (Greece) Eleni Daniilidou / (Australia) Nicole Pratt (champions)
3. (Hungary) Petra Mandula / (Switzerland) Patty Schnyder (semifinals)
4. (Croatia) Jelena Kostanić / (Chinese Taipei) Janet Lee (semifinals)

== Draw ==
=== Key ===
- Q = Qualifier
- WC = Wild card
- LL = Lucky loser
- Alt = Alternate
- SE = Special exempt
- PR = Protected ranking
- ITF = ITF entry
- JE = Junior exempt
- w/o = Walkover
- r = Retired
- d = Defaulted
- SR = Special ranking

=== Draw ===
First round
1	(United States) M Tu (Venezuela) M Vento-Kabchi	6	6
(United States) A Augustus (South Africa) N Grandin	3	2
(Czech Republic) I Benešová (Luxembourg) C Schaul	6^{1}	6	7^{10}
WC	(United States) A Haynes (Serbia and Montenegro) J Janković	7^{7}	3	6^{8}
4	(Croatia) J Kostanić (Chinese Taipei) J Lee	6	7
Q	(United States) L Osterloh (United States) R Zalameda	2	5
(Russia) A Jidkova (United States) L Lee-Waters	6^{4}	6	6
(United States) A Harkleroad (Argentina) P Tarabini	7^{7}	3	3
(United States) T Ashley (United States) A Spears	6	6
(New Zealand) L Baker (Italy) F Lubiani	4	2
(Republic of Ireland) K Liggan (Spain) A Parra Santonja	4	7	2
3	(Hungary) P Mandula (Switzerland) P Schnyder	6	5	6
(United States) J Russell (United States) M Washington	6^{3}	4
(Australia) C Dellacqua (Australia) N Sewell	7^{7}	6
(Germany) A Barna (United States) A Frazier	1	4
2	(Greece) E Daniilidou (Australia) N Pratt	6	6

Quarterfinals
1	(United States) M Tu (Venezuela) M Vento-Kabchi	4	6	1
(Czech Republic) I Benešová (Luxembourg) C Schaul	6	3	6
4	(Croatia) J Kostanić (Chinese Taipei) J Lee	6	6
(Russia) A Jidkova (United States) L Lee-Waters	3	1
(United States) T Ashley (United States) A Spears	6^{5}	4
3	(Hungary) P Mandula (Switzerland) P Schnyder	7^{7}	6
(Australia) C Dellacqua (Australia) N Sewell	3	1
2	(Greece) E Daniilidou (Australia) N Pratt	6	6

Semifinals
(Czech Republic) I Benešová (Luxembourg) C Schaul	6	6
4	(Croatia) J Kostanić (Chinese Taipei) J Lee	2	4
3	(Hungary) P Mandula (Switzerland) P Schnyder	3	0
2	(Greece) E Daniilidou (Australia) N Pratt	6	6

Final
(Czech Republic) I Benešová (Luxembourg) C Schaul	2	4
2	(Greece) E Daniilidou (Australia) N Pratt	6	6
