= 2008 Bank of the West Classic – Doubles =

Doubles
- 2008 Bank of the West Classic

Final
- Champions: (Zimbabwe) Cara Black (United States) Liezel Huber
- Runners-up: (Russia) Elena Vesnina (Russia) Vera Zvonareva
- Score: 6–4, 6–3

Details
- Draw: 16
- Seeds: 4

Events
Singles	Doubles
- Bank of the West Classic

The defending champions lost separately in the first round. Sania Mirza partnered with Anna Chakvetadze and lost to Eva Hrdinová and Vladimíra Uhlířová. Shahar Pe'er teamed with Gisela Dulko to lose to Ayumi Morita and Ai Sugiyama.

Cara Black and Liezel Huber won the final 6–4, 6–3, over Elena Vesnina and Vera Zvonareva.

== Seeds ==
1. (Zimbabwe) Cara Black / (United States) Liezel Huber (champions)
2. (Chinese Taipei) Chia-jung Chuang / (Italy) Francesca Schiavone (withdrew due to a left ankle sprain for Schiavone)
3. (Argentina) Gisela Dulko / (Israel) Shahar Pe'er (first round)
4. (Belarus) Tatiana Poutchek / (Russia) Anastasia Rodionova (semifinals)

== Draw ==
Key

- Q = Qualifier
- WC = Wild card
- LL = Lucky loser
- Alt = Alternate
- ITF = ITF entry
- PR = Protected ranking
- SR = Special ranking
- SE = Special exempt
- JE = Junior exempt
- JR = Junior Accelerator Programme entrant
- CO = College Accelerator Programme entrant
- NG = Next Gen Accelerator Program entrant
- w/o = Walkover
- r = Retired
- d = Defaulted

=== Draw ===
First round
1	(Zimbabwe) C Black (United States) L Huber	6	6
(South Africa) N Grandin (United States) A Haynes	4	3
(Czech Republic) E Hrdinová (Czech Republic) V Uhlířová	6	6
(Russia) A Chakvetadze (India) S Mirza	3	4
4	(Belarus) T Poutchek (Russia) A Rodionova	6	6
(Slovakia) D Hantuchová (Russia) N Petrova	4	3
WC	(United States) A Yelsey (United States) R Zalameda	6	2	[10]
WC	(South Africa) K Anderson (Switzerland) P Schnyder	3	6	[5]
(Russia) A Kleybanova (Romania) M Niculescu	6	6
(Belarus) O Govortsova (Belarus) D Kustova	4	2
(Japan) A Morita (Japan) A Sugiyama	4	6	[10]
3	(Argentina) G Dulko (Israel) S Pe'er	6	2	[8]
(Russia) E Vesnina (Russia) V Zvonareva	6	6
(Latvia) L Dekmeijere (United States) A Spears	4	3
(Uzbekistan) A Amanmuradova (Ukraine) K Bondarenko	6	6
Alt	(United States) A Harkleroad (Russia) A Jidkova	1	2

Quarterfinals
1	(Zimbabwe) C Black (United States) L Huber	6	6
(Czech Republic) E Hrdinová (Czech Republic) V Uhlířová	3	4
4	(Belarus) T Poutchek (Russia) A Rodionova	6	6
WC	(United States) A Yelsey (United States) R Zalameda	3	1
(Russia) A Kleybanova (Romania) M Niculescu	6	6
(Japan) A Morita (Japan) A Sugiyama	1	4
(Russia) E Vesnina (Russia) V Zvonareva	7	5	[10]
(Uzbekistan) A Amanmuradova (Ukraine) K Bondarenko	6^{4}	7	[6]

Semifinals
1	(Zimbabwe) C Black (United States) L Huber	4	6	[10]
4	(Belarus) T Poutchek (Russia) A Rodionova	6	3	[7]
(Russia) A Kleybanova (Romania) M Niculescu	6	3	[3]
(Russia) E Vesnina (Russia) V Zvonareva	2	6	[10]

Final
1	(Zimbabwe) C Black (United States) L Huber	6	6
(Russia) E Vesnina (Russia) V Zvonareva	4	3
