= 2003 Bank of the West Classic – Doubles =

Doubles
- 2003 Bank of the West Classic

Final
- Champions: (Zimbabwe) Cara Black (United States) Lisa Raymond
- Runners-up: (South Korea) Cho Yoon-jeong (Italy) Francesca Schiavone
- Score: 7–6^{(7–5)}, 6–1

Details
- Draw: 16 (2WC/1Q/1LL)
- Seeds: 4

Events
Singles	Doubles
← 2002 ·	Silicon Valley Classic	· 2004 →

Lisa Raymond and Rennae Stubbs were the defending champions, but competed this year with different partners.

Stubbs teamed up with Meghann Shaughnessy and lost in quarterfinals to Teryn Ashley and Abigail Spears.

Raymond teamed up with Cara Black and successfully defended her title, by defeating Cho Yoon-jeong and Francesca Schiavone 7–6^{(7–5)}, 6–1 in the final.

== Seeds ==
1. (Zimbabwe) Cara Black / (United States) Lisa Raymond (champions)
2. (United States) Meghann Shaughnessy / (Australia) Rennae Stubbs (quarterfinals)
3. (France) Marion Bartoli / (Russia) Alina Jidkova (quarterfinals)
4. (Greece) Eleni Daniilidou / (Italy) Rita Grande (semifinals)

== Draw ==
=== Key ===
- Q = Qualifier
- WC = Wild card
- LL = Lucky loser
- Alt = Alternate
- SE = Special exempt
- PR = Protected ranking
- ITF = ITF entry
- JE = Junior exempt
- w/o = Walkover
- r = Retired
- d = Defaulted
- SR = Special ranking

=== Draw ===
First round
1	(Zimbabwe) C Black (United States) L Raymond	6	6
(South Africa) K Grant (Venezuela) M Vento-Kabchi	4	3
(United States) A Augustus (United States) J Embry	6	4	1
WC	(United States) J Capriati (Slovakia) D Hantuchová	3	6	6
4	(Greece) E Daniilidou (Italy) R Grande	6	6
(United States) J Craybas (United States) M Washington	1	2
(Argentina) P Tarabini (Netherlands) C Vis	3	5
Q	(Switzerland) MG Mikaelian (Ukraine) J Vakulenko	6	7
(South Korea) Y-j Cho (Italy) F Schiavone	6	7^{7}
(United States) A Frazier (United States) E Schmidt	2	6^{1}
LL	(Canada) A Soukup-Zahalka (United States) T Snyder	4	3
3	(France) M Bartoli (Russia) A Jidkova	6	6
(United States) T Ashley (United States) A Spears	6	6
(United States) G Lastra (United States) S Taylor	4	4
WC	(United States) C Fusano (United States) R Kops-Jones	2	3
2	(United States) M Shaughnessy (Australia) R Stubbs	6	6

Quarterfinals
1	(Zimbabwe) C Black (United States) L Raymond	7	6
WC	(United States) J Capriati (Slovakia) D Hantuchová	5	1
4	(Greece) E Daniilidou (Italy) R Grande	3	6	6
Q	(Switzerland) MG Mikaelian (Ukraine) J Vakulenko	6	2	2
(South Korea) Y-j Cho (Italy) F Schiavone	3	6	6
3	(France) M Bartoli (Russia) A Jidkova	6	3	4
(United States) T Ashley (United States) A Spears	6	6
2	(United States) M Shaughnessy (Australia) R Stubbs	4	2

Semifinals
1	(Zimbabwe) C Black (United States) L Raymond	6	6
4	(Greece) E Daniilidou (Italy) R Grande	1	4
(South Korea) Y-j Cho (Italy) F Schiavone	7	7^{9}
(United States) T Ashley (United States) A Spears	5	6^{7}

Final
1	(Zimbabwe) C Black (United States) L Raymond	7^{7}	6
(South Korea) Y-j Cho (Italy) F Schiavone	6^{5}	1
