= Aleksandra Wozniak =

Canadian tennis player (born 1987)

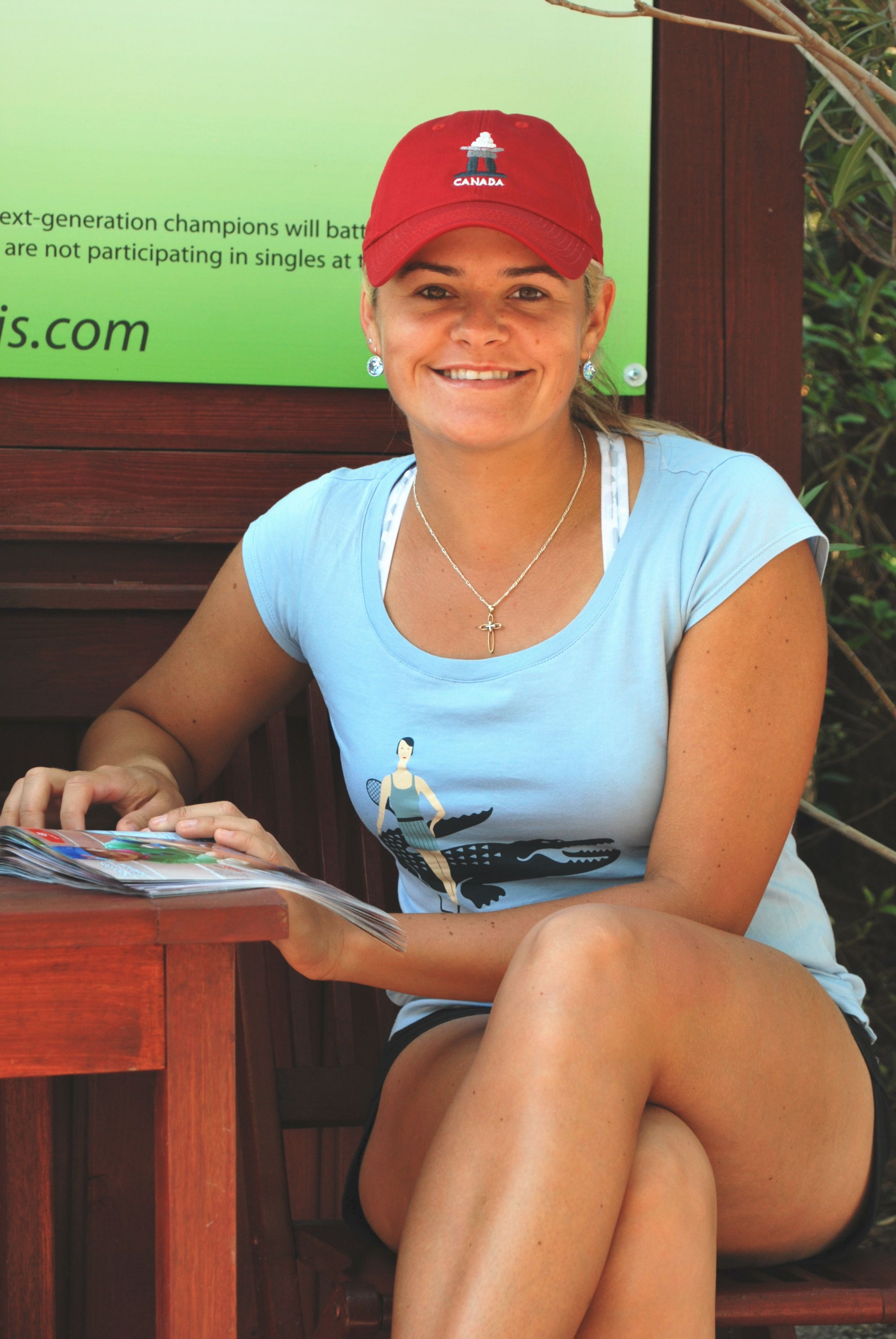
- Country (sports): Canada
- Born: September 7, 1987 (age 39) Montreal, Quebec
- Height: 1.75 m (5 ft 9 in)
- Turned pro: November 2005
- Retired: December 2018
- Plays: Right-handed (two-handed backhand)
- Prize money: US$ 2,028,797

Singles
- Career record: 363–246
- Career titles: 1
- Highest ranking: No. 21 (June 22, 2009)

Grand Slam singles results
- Australian Open: 2R (2012)
- French Open: 4R (2009)
- Wimbledon: 2R (2008, 2010, 2012)
- US Open: 3R (2009)

Other tournaments
- Olympic Games: 2R (2012)

Doubles
- Career record: 35–58
- Career titles: 0
- Highest ranking: No. 136 (June 7, 2010)

Grand Slam doubles results
- Australian Open: 1R (2009, 2010)
- French Open: 2R (2010, 2012)
- Wimbledon: 2R (2009, 2010)
- US Open: 2R (2013)

Other doubles tournaments
- Olympic Games: 1R (2012)

Grand Slam mixed doubles results
- Australian Open: QF (2009)

Team competitions
- Fed Cup: 40–12

Aleksandra Wozniak (Polish: Woźniak [ˈvɔʑ.ɲak]; born September 7, 1987) is a Canadian former tennis player. She turned professional in November 2005, and achieved a career-best ranking of No. 21 in June 2009, making her the fifth highest-ranked Canadian singles player of all time. She won one WTA and eleven ITF tournaments. At the Bank of the West Classic in Stanford in 2008, she became the first Canadian in 20 years to capture a WTA singles title and the first Quebecer in history to have accomplished such a feat. She reached a career-high ITF junior ranking of No. 3 on January 31, 2005. Wozniak was named Female Player of the Year by Tennis Canada five times (2004, 2006, 2008, 2009, 2012).

== Early life ==
Wozniak's family immigrated to Canada from Poland in 1983, before she was born. She speaks Polish, English and French fluently. She has an elder sister, Dorota, who also played tennis. Aleksandra started playing tennis at the age of three. She was inspired to pick up a racquet by her sister and Monica Seles, her idol growing up, and was coached by her father Antoni.

== Tennis career ==
=== 2002–2007: early years ===
In 2002, as a 14-year-old, Wozniak won the Canadian Indoors Under-16 and Under-18 championships. She won the Kentucky International Junior Tennis Derby in 2004, and in 2005, she reached No. 3 in the juniors' ranking. She also won the Tevlin Challenger 25k tournament in Toronto, the Hamilton Challenger 25k in Canada, the Victoria Challenger 25k and the Junior Casablanca Cup (as well as the doubles) in Mexico, and the Junior Del Cafe Cup (as well as the doubles) in Costa Rica.

In 2006, Wozniak won the Pittsburgh Challenger (defeating Belarusian Victoria Azarenka), and the Ashland Challenger (defeating Hungarian Ágnes Szávay). Wozniak also won the Challenger in Hamilton the same year. In February she beat her first top-100 player, world No. 63 Li Na, in Thailand. In November 2006, she defeated her first top-50 player, world No. 40, Olga Puchkova, in Pittsburgh.

=== 2008: breakthrough and first WTA title ===
At the French Open, Wozniak made it to the third round of a Grand Slam championship for the first time in her career before losing to 11th seed Vera Zvonareva. By achieving this feat, she became the first Québécoise singles player to reach the third round of a Grand Slam since 2002.

In July, Wozniak won her first, and what would be her only, WTA singles title at the Stanford Classic. During the tournament she beat world No. 20, Francesca Schiavone, world No. 29, Sybille Bammer, and world No. 5, Serena Williams (who had to retire in the match), en route to defeating sixth seed Marion Bartoli in the final. Because she needed to earn a spot in the tournament by winning through pre-tournament qualifying rounds, she had to win three qualifying matches followed by five main-draw matches for a combined total of eight match wins in nine days. Wozniak became the first Canadian in 20 years to win a WTA Tour singles title. The victory vaulted her WTA ranking by 40 spots, as she jumped from No. 85 to No. 45 in the world. In August 2008, she was presented with key to the city in Blainville, Québec, by the mayor; they renamed it "Wozniakville" for 24 hours commemorating her achievement as the first time a woman from Québec had won a Sony Ericsson WTA Tour singles title (when she won Stanford in July).

She also received an award from the National Assembly of Québec in October 2008 for her career-high ranking of No. 37 and first WTA singles title.

=== 2009: continued good form and career-high ranking of No. 21 ===
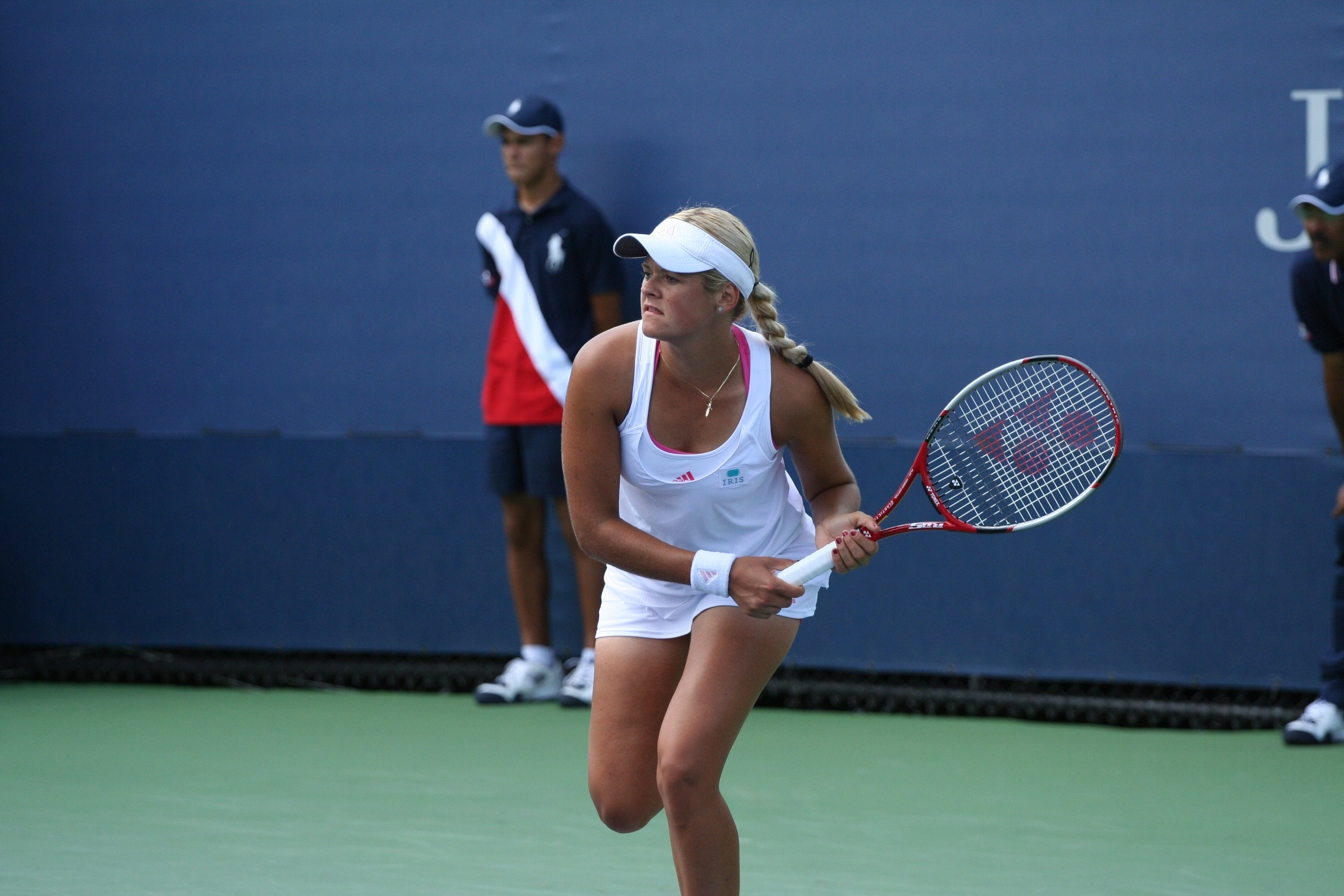
Wozniak in her first round match against Granville at the 2009 US Open

Wozniak was upset by German Sabine Lisicki, also of Polish heritage, in the first round of the Australian Open where Wozniak was the 30th seed. Wozniak joined up with compatriot Daniel Nestor in the mixed doubles, where they made it to the quarterfinals before losing to Sania Mirza and Mahesh Bhupathi.

In March, she defeated world No. 48, Lucie Šafářová, in Indian Wells. That month she moved up to a career-best world No. 29. She reached her third singles final in April in the Ponte Vedra Beach, beating world No. 10, Nadia Petrova, in the semifinals, but was then defeated by world No. 12, Caroline Wozniacki. In May, she upset world No. 13, Marion Bartoli, at the Madrid Open.

At the French Open, Wozniak was the 24th seed and became the first Québécoise to ever be seeded at Roland-Garros. Wozniak made it to the round of 16, before losing to Serena Williams. With her French Open success, Wozniak became Canada's first representative in the fourth round of the French Open women's draw in 17 years, and the first Canadian woman to survive into the second week at the French Open since Patricia Hy-Boulais in 1992. Wozniak was also the first Canadian to reach the fourth round of a Grand Slam event since Maureen Drake qualified for the round of 16 at the 1999 Australian Open. "That's awesome for Canada and I hope to keep going", said Wozniak.

She debuted her grass season in June, at the Eastbourne International, Wozniak made it to the semifinals, before losing to Caroline Wozniacki. After that tournament, Wozniak's ranking rose two spots, to a career-high of No. 21. At Wimbledon, she was the first Canadian to be seeded in singles in 20 years at No. 23. However, she fell in the first round to Francesca Schiavone.

At the US Open, she advanced to the third round before losing to tenth seed Flavia Pennetta. Wozniak entered the Pan Pacific Open in Tokyo and made it into the third round before losing in three sets to Magdaléna Rybáriková.

Wozniak was named Athlete of the Year for the second time in three years at the Tennis Quebec Excellence Awards. Her father Antoni and fitness trainer André Parent were joint winners of the International Coach of the Year Award for Quebec athletes. She was also named Female Athlete of the Year by the Canadian Press in recognition of her outstanding season.

=== 2010–11: struggle with form and injuries ===
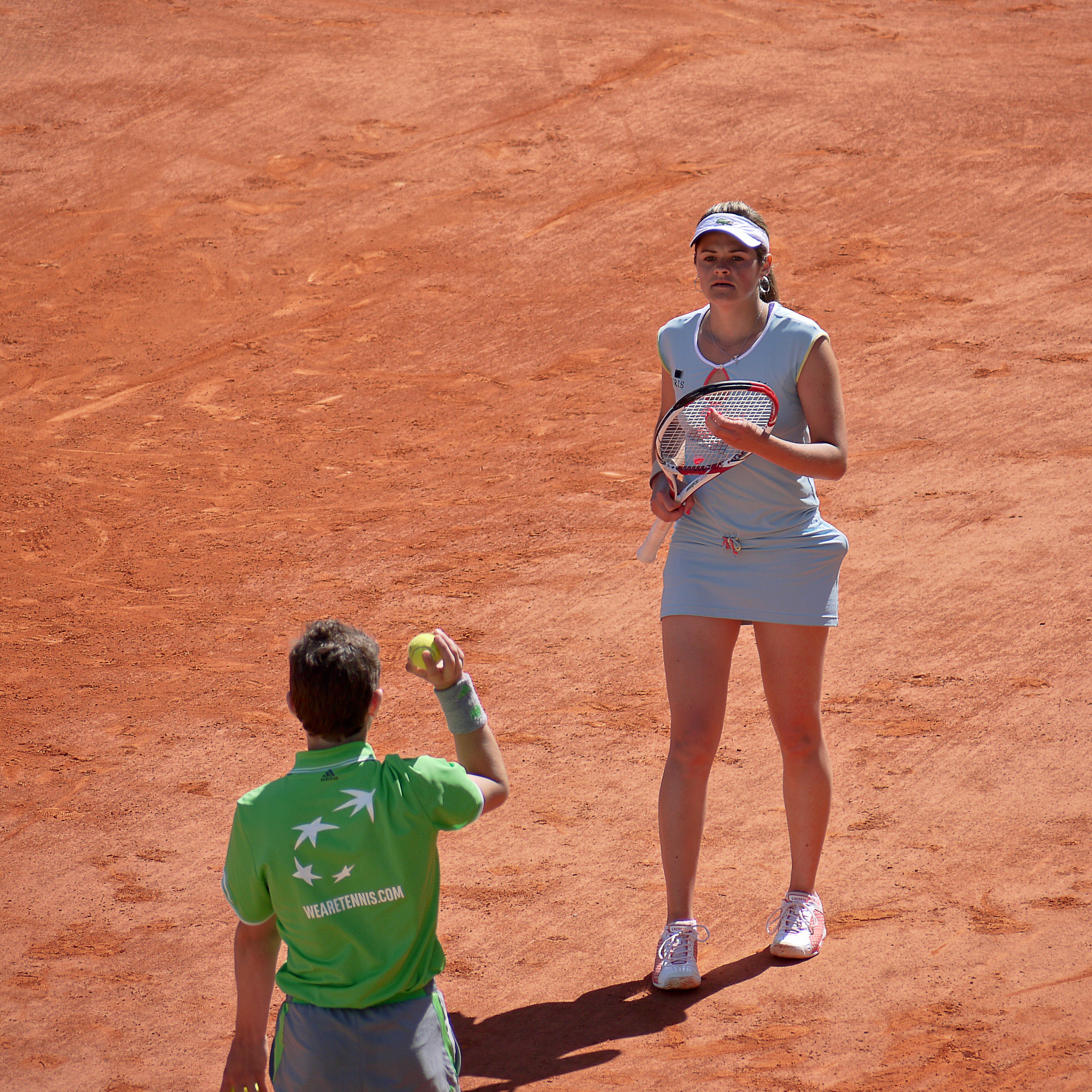
At the 2011 French Open, her first Slam since coming back from injury

In January at the Australian Open, Caroline Wozniacki eliminated Wozniak for the sixth time in straight sets. After early losses in Miami and Indian Wells, she went to defend her last year final in Ponte Vedra Beach. However, she lost in the quarterfinals to Dominika Cibulková.

At the French Open, she lost in the third round to fifth seed Elena Dementieva in a match that lasted more than three hours. At Wimbledon, Wozniak made it to the second round before losing to fourth seed Jelena Janković. After losing in the first round of the Rogers Cup in her native Quebec against Timea Bacsinszky, she lost again in the first round at the US Open against world No. 202, Sally Peers, in a match that took just 48 minutes. She was out for the remainder of the season due to a forearm injury.

In her first Grand Slam appearance since coming back from injury, Wozniak qualified for the 2011 French Open. She won her first round match against Junri Namigata before losing in the second round to world No. 1 Wozniacki. She also qualified for Wimbledon, but lost in the first round against Barbora Záhlavová-Strýcová.

She won in early August the second biggest tournament of her career at the $100k Vancouver Open, where she defeated Jamie Hampton in the final. Wozniak qualified for her third straight Grand Slam at the US Open, but lost in the first round to young American Christina McHale.

=== 2012: return to form and first Olympic experience ===
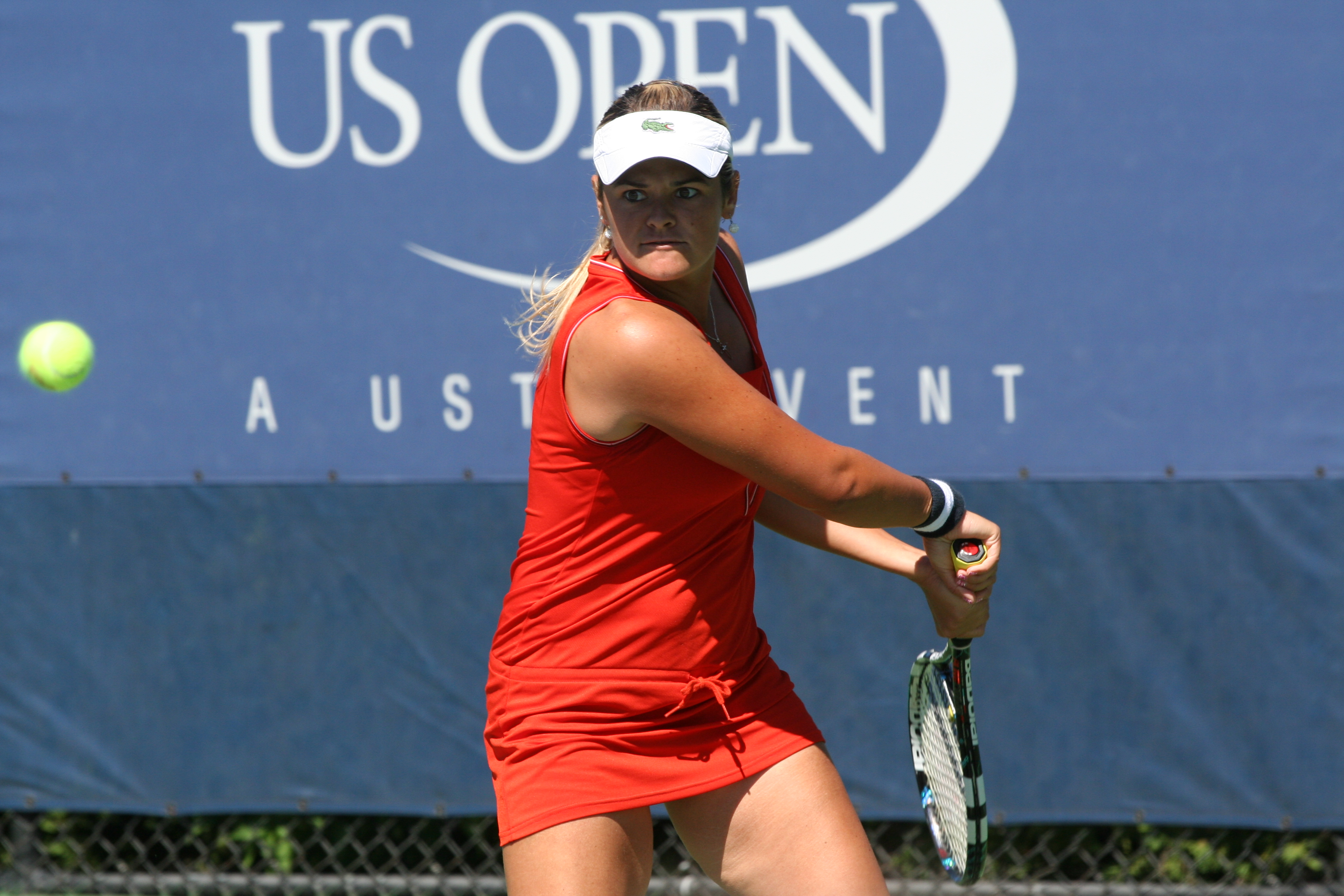
Wozniak at the US Open in 2012

At the first Grand Slam of the season, the Australian Open, Wozniak defeated Zhang Shuai in the first round. She made it through to the second round for the first time of her career. She was defeated by 27th seed, Maria Kirilenko, in the next round. In March, she won the $100k Bahamas Open, beating Alizé Cornet in the final. Wozniak reached the third round of the Miami Open with wins over Eleni Daniilidou and world No. 28, Monica Niculescu, in first and second round respectively, but lost to Venus Williams after having a match point in the third set.

At the French Open, she reached the third round for the fourth time in five years, but lost to world No. 1, Victoria Azarenka. She was eliminated in the second round at Wimbledon by world No. 27, Zheng Jie. Wozniak qualified for the Summer Olympics in London, but lost to Venus Williams in the second round. At the Rogers Cup, she reached the quarterfinals at a Premier 5 tournament for the first time of her career, where she lost to Caroline Wozniacki. She became the first Canadian in 20 years (since Patricia Hy-Boulais in 1992) to reach the quarterfinals there. Wozniak lost in the second round of the US Open to world No. 17, Lucie Šafářová.

She was forced to end her season prematurely after suffering a joint sprain in her right shoulder at the Challenge Bell in September.

=== 2013: more injuries ===
Wozniak made a first return following her injury at the Miami Open in March, but fell to Kristina Mladenovic in the first round. She was then forced to take a second break of three months to make sure her shoulder is completely healed. She made a second return at the New Haven Open in mid-August, but was defeated in three sets by world No. 26, Ekaterina Makarova, in her opening match. Her next tournament was the US Open where she was eliminated by world No. 2, Victoria Azarenka, in the second round.

In September, Wozniak lost in the first round of the Challenge Bell to the eighth seed Caroline Garcia. At the Premier-5 Pan Pacific Open in late September, Wozniak made it to the second round using her protected ranking. She defeated world No. 47, Francesca Schiavone, in the opening round, but fell to the second seed Agnieszka Radwańska in the next one. The next week, she lost in the first round of the Premier Mandatory China Open to world No. 13, Sloane Stephens. At the last tournament of her season in early October, the HP Open, she was defeated by Kristina Mladenovic in the first round.

=== 2014: shoulder surgery ===
Wozniak started the season, and the first with her new coach, Nathalie Tauziat, at the Shenzhen Open, but lost to Viktorija Golubic in the first round. At the Australian Open, Wozniak fell in the first round of qualifying to Anna Tatishvili. In February, she helped Canada reach the World Group play-offs for the first time since 2004 with a three-set win over Vesna Dolonc. In late February, Wozniak reached the second round of the Mexican Open with a win over Ashleigh Barty in her opening match. She was eliminated by Zhang Shuai in the next round.

At the Premier Mandatory Indian Wells Open in March, Wozniak defeated Urszula Radwańska in her opening match to set up a clash with world No. 15, Sabine Lisicki, in the next round. She won in three sets after being down 2–5 in the third set tiebreak, and with Lisicki serving twice for the match. She beat her second straight top-30 player with a victory over Anastasia Pavlyuchenkova in the third round. She was defeated by world No. 2, Li Na, in the round of 16. In mid-March, Wozniak was awarded a wildcard for the Miami Open but was eliminated by Caroline Garcia in the first round. At her next tournament, the Monterrey Open in late March, she qualified for the main draw and won her opening match over Marcela Zacarías, but was stopped by world No. 13, Ana Ivanovic, in the next round.

In April, Wozniak won a crucial match over world No. 52, Jana Čepelová, at the Fed Cup World Group play-offs to help Canada get its place in the World Group I, the first time ever for the country since the introduction of the new World Group format in 1995. At the French Open in May, Wozniak qualified for the main draw but lost in three sets to world No. 26, Sorana Cîrstea, in the first round, despite having a match point in the second set. At a warm up tournament for Wimbledon, the Premier-level Birmingham Classic, she qualified for the main draw and reached the third round. She was eliminated by world No. 25, Kirsten Flipkens, in three sets. Wozniak qualified for her second straight Grand Slam at Wimbledon, but was defeated by world No. 10, Dominika Cibulková, in the first round. In August, Wozniak was awarded a wildcard for the Rogers Cup where she was eliminated by world No. 20, Sloane Stephens, in the opening round. She lost in the first round of the US Open to world No. 33, Kurumi Nara, at the end of August. Wozniak had to end her season prematurely to have shoulder surgery.

=== 2015–17: new start ===
Wozniak made her return in late August 2015 at the 25k in Winnipeg after an 11-month layoff following her shoulder surgery. She advanced to the quarterfinals, but was defeated by Michaëlla Krajicek. In September 2015 at the Coupe Banque Nationale, she was awarded a wildcard into the qualifying draw where she lost in the first round to Mandy Minella. She was also unable to qualify for her next tournament, this time in the final round of the $75k Coleman Vision Championships one week later. In October 2015, Wozniak lost in the first round of her final two tournaments of the season, the 50ks in Tampico and Saguenay.

In February 2016, Wozniak advanced to the quarterfinals of the $25k in Surprise, Arizona. She used her protected ranking to enter the main draw of the French Open, her first Grand Slam main draw since the 2014 US Open, but was defeated by Yulia Putintseva in the opening round. At the end of July, using again her protected ranking, she entered the singles main draw of the Washington Open where she lost to Jessica Pegula in the first round. The next week, she received a wildcard into the main draw of the Rogers Cup and lost in the first round to Sara Errani. She next played the Challenger de Granby, a $50k event, and reached the semifinals.

At the Coupe Banque Nationale in September, she was awarded a wildcard to play in the main draw, but she lost to Pegula in her opener for the second time in two months. At the $75k Coleman Vision Championships the next week, Wozniak advanced to the semifinals where she lost to Mandy Minella in three sets. Also in September, she reached the quarterfinals of the 25k in Stillwater. At the Challenger de Saguenay in October, Wozniak made it to the quarterfinals, losing to first seed CiCi Bellis.

In January 2017, Wozniak lost in the qualifying first round at the Australian Open. The next month, she reached the quarterfinals of the $60k in Burnie. In May, she was awarded a wildcard in the qualifying draw at the French Open but lost in the opening round. For most of the summer, she played on the ITF Circuit. At the end of July 2017 at the $25k in Gatineau, Wozniak captured her first title since 2012 with a straight-sets victory over Ellen Perez. In October 2017, she won her second title of the season with a victory over Marie Bouzková at the $25k in Stillwater, Oklahoma.

== Fed Cup ==
Wozniak won her first Fed Cup match in 2004, defeating Swiss Timea Bacsinszky, and boasts a 40–12 record through April 2016. Her 40 total victories are a Canadian Fed Cup record, as are her 32 wins in singles. She has appeared in 36 ties in the Fed Cup, also a record.

== Style of play ==
Wozniak had an all court game that was anchored by her first serve and backhand. Her favourite surface is clay.

== WTA career finals ==
=== Singles: 3 (1 title, 2 runner-ups) ===
Legend Grand Slam tournaments (0–0) Tier I / Premier M & Premier 5 (0–0) Tier II / Premier (1–0) Tier III, IV & V / International (0–2)	Finals by surface Hard (1–0) Grass (0–0) Clay (0–2) Carpet (0–0)

Result	W–L	Date	Tournament	Tier	Surface	Opponent	Score
Loss	0–1	May 2007	Morocco Open	Tier IV	Clay	(Venezuela) Milagros Sequera	1–6, 3–6
Win	1–1	Jul 2008	Stanford Classic, United States	Tier II	Hard	(France) Marion Bartoli	7–5, 6–3
loss	1–2	Apr 2009	Amelia Island Championships, United States	International	Clay	(Denmark) Caroline Wozniacki	1–6, 2–6

== ITF Circuit finals ==
=== Singles: 14 (11 titles, 3 runner-ups) ===
Legend
$100,000 tournaments (2–0)
$75,000 tournaments (1–0)
$50,000 tournaments (1–0)
$25,000 tournaments (6–3)
$10,000 tournaments (1–0)

Result	W–L	Date	Tournament	Tier	Surface	Opponent	Score
Win	1–0	Jun 2002	ITF Lachine, Canada	10,000	Hard	(Canada) Beier Ko	6–0, 6–3
Win	2–0	Jul 2005	ITF Hamilton, Canada	25,000	Clay	(Argentina) María José Argeri	6–1, 6–2
Loss	2–1	Oct 2005	ITF Pelham, United States	25,000	Clay	(Argentina) Soledad Esperón	5–7, 2–6
Win	3–1	Oct 2005	ITF Victoria, Mexico	25,000	Hard	(Czech Republic) Olga Blahotová	2–6, 6–0, 6–4
Loss	3–2	Oct 2005	ITF Mexico City, Mexico	25,000	Hard	(Argentina) María José Argeri	4–6, 0–4 ret.
Win	4–2	Nov 2005	Toronto Challenger, Canada	25,000	Hard (i)	(Ukraine) Olena Antypina	6–4, 6–3
Win	5–2	Jul 2006	ITF Hamilton, Canada	25,000	Clay	(Canada) Valérie Tétreault	6–1, 6–7^{(5–7)}, 6–2
Win	6–2	Oct 2006	ITF Ashland, United States	50,000	Hard	(Hungary) Ágnes Szávay	6–1, 7–6^{(7–2)}
Win	7–2	Nov 2006	ITF Pittsburgh, United States	75,000	Hard (i)	(Belarus) Victoria Azarenka	6–2, ret.
Loss	7–3	Mar 2008	ITF Redding, United States	25,000	Hard	(Czech Republic) Barbora Záhlavová-Strýcová	6–7^{(4–7)}, 3–6
Win	8–3	Aug 2011	Vancouver Open, Canada	100,000	Hard	(United States) Jamie Hampton	6–3, 6–1
Win	9–3	Mar 2012	Nassau Open, Bahamas	100,000	Hard	(France) Alizé Cornet	6–4, 7–5
Win	10–3	Jul 2017	Challenger de Gatineau, Canada	25,000	Hard	(Australia) Ellen Perez	7–6^{(7–4)}, 6–4
Win	11–3	Oct 2017	ITF Stillwater, United States	25,000	Hard	(Czech Republic) Marie Bouzková	7–5, 6–4

=== Doubles: 2 (2 runner-ups) ===
Legend
$25,000 tournaments (0–1)
$10,000 tournaments (0–1)

Result	W–L	Date	Tournament	Tier	Surface	Partner	Opponents	Score
Loss	0–1	Jun 2002	ITF Toronto, Canada	10,000	Hard	(Canada) Diana Srebrovic	(Australia) Lauren Cheung (Australia) Christina Horiatopoulos	3–6, 1–6
Loss	0–2	Jul 2006	ITF Hamilton, Canada	25,000	Clay	(Argentina) Soledad Esperón	(Australia) Nicole Kriz (United States) Story Tweedie-Yates	4–6, 1–6

== Grand Slam performance timelines ==
Key
W	F	SF	QF	#R	RR	Q#	P#	DNQ	A	Z#	PO	G	S	B	NMS	NTI	P	NH

(W) winner; (F) finalist; (SF) semifinalist; (QF) quarterfinalist; (#R) rounds 4, 3, 2, 1; (RR) round-robin stage; (Q#) qualification round; (P#) preliminary round; (DNQ) did not qualify; (A) absent; (Z#) Davis/Fed Cup Zonal Group (with number indication) or (PO) play-off; (G) gold, (S) silver or (B) bronze Olympic/Paralympic medal; (NMS) not a Masters tournament; (NTI) not a Tier I tournament; (P) postponed; (NH) not held; (SR) strike rate (events won / competed); (W–L) win–loss record.

=== Singles ===
Tournament	2001	2002	2003	2004	2005	2006	2007	2008	2009	2010	2011	2012	2013	2014	2015	2016	2017	2018	SR	W–L	Win %
Grand Slam tournaments
Australian Open	A	A	A	A	A	Q3	1R	Q1	1R	1R	A	2R	A	Q1	A	Q1	Q1	A	0 / 4	1–4	20%
French Open	A	A	A	A	A	Q2	1R	3R	4R	3R	2R	3R	A	1R	A	1R	Q1	A	0 / 8	10–8	56%
Wimbledon	A	A	A	A	A	Q1	1R	2R	1R	2R	1R	2R	A	1R	A	A	A		0 / 7	3–7	30%
US Open	A	A	A	A	A	Q2	1R	1R	3R	1R	1R	2R	2R	1R	A	A	A		0 / 8	4–8	33%
Win–loss	0–0	0–0	0–0	0–0	0–0	0–0	0–4	3–3	5–4	3–4	1–3	5–4	1–1	0–3	0–0	0–1	0–0	0–0	0 / 27	18–27	40%
National representation
Summer Olympics	Not Held			A	Not Held			A	Not Held			2R	Not Held			A	Not Held		0 / 1	1–1	50%
Fed Cup	A	A	A	PO	AZ1	WG2	WG2	AZ1	WG2	WG2	WG2	AZ1	A	PO	A	WG2	A	A	0 / 0	32–11	74%
Premier Mandatory / Premier 5 tournaments
Doha / Dubai^{[1]}	A	A	A	A	A	A	A	A	A	A	A	1R	A	A	A	A	A	A	0 / 1	0–1	0%
Indian Wells	A	A	A	A	A	A	1R	Q2	3R	2R	Q1	1R	A	4R	A	Q2	A	A	0 / 5	4–5	44%
Miami	A	A	A	A	Q1	A	1R	2R	2R	2R	A	3R	1R	1R	A	A	A	A	0 / 7	3–7	30%
Madrid	Not Held								2R	1R	A	A	A	A	A	A	A	A	0 / 2	1–2	33%
Rome	A	A	A	A	A	A	A	A	2R	A	A	1R	A	A	A	A	A	A	0 / 2	1–2	33%
Canada	A	A	Q1	1R	1R	1R	2R	2R	1R	1R	2R	QF	A	1R	A	1R	Q1		0 / 11	6–11	35%
Cincinnati	Not Tier I								2R	A	A	A	A	A	A	A	A		0 / 1	1–1	50%
Tokyo / Wuhan^{[2]}	A	A	A	A	A	Q1	A	1R	3R	A	A	A	2R	A	A	A	A		0 / 3	3–3	50%
Beijing	Not Tier I								3R	A	A	A	1R	A	A	A	A		0 / 2	2–2	50%
Win–loss	0–0	0–0	0–0	0–1	0–1	0–1	1–3	2–3	8–8	0–4	1–1	5–5	1–3	3–3	0–0	0–1	0–0	0–0	0 / 34	21–34	38%
Career statistics
	2001	2002	2003	2004	2005	2006	2007	2008	2009	2010	2011	2012	2013	2014	2015	2016	2017	2018	SR	W–L	Win %
Tournaments	1	4	4	6	14	26	27	23	25	18	14	21	7	17	5	17	20	3	252		
Titles	0	0	0	0	0	0	0	1	0	0	0	0	0	0	0	0	0	0	1		
Finals	0	0	0	0	0	0	1	1	1	0	0	0	0	0	0	0	0	0	3		
Hardcourt Win–loss	0–0	11–3	0–1	5–3	19–5	34–15	16–18	29–14	13–14	3–9	19–10	23–10	2–6	14–11	4–4	21–14	21–12	1–2	1 / 158	235–151	61%
Clay win–loss	0–0	0–0	1–2	6–3	25–7	7–6	5–3	6–5	10–7	6–6	5–2	8–6	0–0	8–4	0–0	0–3	2–5	1–1	0 / 60	90–60	60%
Grass win–loss	0–0	0–0	0–0	0–0	0–0	0–1	0–3	2–2	4–3	5–3	3–1	3–3	0–0	7–2	0–0	0–0	0–0	0–0	0 / 18	24–18	57%
Carpet win–loss	2–1	0–0	1–1	0–0	0–1	2–2	1–5	3–1	3–1	0–0	1–1	1–0	0–1	0–0	0–1	0–1	0–1	0–0	0 / 16	14–17	45%
Overall win–loss	2–1	11–3	2–4	11–6	44–13	43–24	22–29	40–22	30–25	14–18	28–14	35–19	2–7	29–17	4–5	21–18	23–18	2–3	1 / 252	363–246	60%
Win %	67%	79%	33%	65%	79%	64%	43%	65%	55%	44%	67%	65%	22%	63%	44%	54%	56%	40%	59.61%		
Year-end ranking	–	569	878	491	190	91	130	34	35	126	105	43	280	132	844	299	300		$2,028,797		

Notes

- ^{^{1}} The first Premier 5 event of the year has switched back and forth between the Dubai Tennis Championships and the Qatar Ladies Open since 2009. Dubai was classified as a Premier 5 event from 2009 to 2011 before being succeeded by Doha for the 2012–2014 period. Since 2015, the two tournaments alternate between Premier 5 and Premier status every year.
- ^{^{2}} In 2014, the Pan Pacific Open was downgraded to a Premier event and replaced by the Wuhan Open.

=== Doubles ===
Tournament	2007	2008	2009	2010	2011	2012	2013	2014	2015	2016	2017	2018	SR	W–L	Win %
Grand Slam tournaments
Australian Open	A	A	1R	1R	A	A	A	A	A	A	A	A	0 / 2	0–2	0%
French Open	1R	A	1R	2R	A	2R	A	A	A	A	A	A	0 / 4	2–4	33%
Wimbledon	A	A	2R	2R	A	1R	A	A	A	A	A	A	0 / 3	2–3	40%
US Open	A	1R	1R	A	A	1R	2R	A	A	A	A	A	0 / 4	1–4	20%
Win–loss	0–1	0–1	1–4	2–3	0–0	1–3	1–1	0–0	0–0	0–0	0–0	0–0	0 / 13	5–13	28%

== Career prize money ==
Annual and career earnings summary (singles and doubles)
	Titles			Earnings		
Year	Grand Slam	WTA	Total	US$	WTA rank	Ref
2007	0	0	0	20,135	n/a	
2008	0	1	1	277,473	60	
2009	0	0	0	443,283	51	
2010	0	0	0	218,732	85	
2011	0	0	0	112,437	n/a	
2012	0	0	0	336,002	65	
2013	0	0	0	104,542	n/a	
2014	0	0	0	206,579	123	
2015	0	0	0	2,841	1010	
2016	0	0	0	61,559	228	
2017	0	0	0	30,669	337	
2018	0	0	0	–	–	
Career	0	1	1	2,027,856	201	

*As of November 6, 2017

== Record against top-20 players ==
Wozniak's win–loss record (11–37, 23%) against players who were ranked world No. 20 or higher when played is as follows:
Players who have been ranked world No. 1 are in boldface.

- (France) Marion Bartoli 2–1
- **(France) Amélie Mauresmo** 1–0
- (Russia) Svetlana Kuznetsova 1–0
- (Italy) Francesca Schiavone 1–0 (Note: has a 2–1 overall record vs. Schiavone)
- (Germany) Sabine Lisicki 1–0 (Note: has a 3–2 overall record vs. Lisicki)
- (China) Zheng Jie 1–0 (Note: has a 2–1 overall record vs. Zheng)
- **(United States) Serena Williams** 1–1
- (Russia) Nadia Petrova 1–1
- **(Serbia) Jelena Janković** 1–4
- **(Denmark) Caroline Wozniacki** 1–7 (Note: has a 1–8 overall record vs. Wozniacki)
- **(Serbia) Ana Ivanovic** 0–1
- **(Russia) Dinara Safina** 0–1
- (Russia) Vera Zvonareva 0–1
- (Australia) Samantha Stosur 0–1 (Note: has a 3–2 overall record vs. Stosur)
- (Switzerland) Patty Schnyder 0–1
- (Slovakia) Dominika Cibulková 0–1 (Note: has a 0–4 overall record vs. Cibulková)
- (Italy) Flavia Pennetta 0–1 (Note: has a 0–2 overall record vs. Pennetta)
- (France) Alizé Cornet 0–1 (Note: has a 3–2 overall record vs. Cornet)
- (Israel) Shahar Pe'er 0–1 (Note: has a 2–2 overall record vs. Pe'er)
- (Czech Republic) Lucie Šafářová 0–1 (Note: has a 1–3 overall record vs. Šafářová)
- (Austria) Sybille Bammer 0–1 (Note: has a 2–1 overall record vs. Bammer)
- (Belarus) **Victoria Azarenka** 0–2 (Note: has a 1–4 overall record vs. Azarenka)
- (China) Li Na 0–2 (Note: has a 1–3 overall record vs. Li)
- (Russia) Elena Dementieva 0–2
- (United States) Sloane Stephens 0–2 (Note: has a 1–3 overall record vs. Stephens)
- (Poland) Agnieszka Radwańska 0–4

=== Wins over top-10 opponents ===
Wozniak has a 4–21 (16%) record against players who were, at the time the match was played, ranked in the top 10.

Wins over top-10 opponents per season
Season	2001	2002	2003	2004	2005	2006	2007	2008	2009	2010	2011	2012	2013	2014	2015	2016	2017	2018	**Total**
Wins	0	0	0	0	0	0	0	1	3	0	0	0	0	0	0	0	0	0	**4**

No.	Opponent	Rank	Event	Surface	Rd	Score	Wozniak Rank
**2008**
1.	(United States) Serena Williams	5	Stanford Classic, United States	Hard	SF	6–2, 3–1 ret.	85
**2009**
2.	(Russia) Nadia Petrova	10	Ponte Vedra Beach, U.S.	Clay	SF	6–4, 4–6, 6–2	35
3.	(Russia) Svetlana Kuznetsova	5	Eastbourne International, UK	Grass	1R	6–0, 6–3	23
4.	(Denmark) Caroline Wozniacki	5	Pan Pacific Open, Japan	Hard	2R	5–0 ret.	35

== Awards ==
- 2004 – Tennis Canada female player of the year
- 2006 – Tennis Canada female player of the year
- 2008 – Tennis Canada female player of the year
- 2009 – Tennis Canada female player of the year
- 2009 – Bobbie Rosenfeld Award
- 2012 – Tennis Canada female player of the year
- 2012 – Queen Elizabeth II Diamond Jubilee Medal
