= 2006 Bank of the West Classic – Doubles =

Doubles
- 2006 Bank of the West Classic

Final
- Champions: (Germany) Anna-Lena Grönefeld (Israel) Shahar Pe'er
- Runners-up: (Italy) Maria Elena Camerin (Argentina) Gisela Dulko
- Score: 6–1, 6–4

Details
- Draw: 16
- Seeds: 4

Events
Singles	Doubles
← 2005 ·	Bank of the West Classic	· 2007 →

Cara Black and Rennae Stubbs were the defending champions, but both chose not to compete that year.

Anna-Lena Grönefeld and Shahar Pe'er won the title, defeating Maria Elena Camerin and Gisela Dulko 6–1, 6–4 in the final.

== Seeds ==
1. (Slovakia) Daniela Hantuchová / (Japan) Ai Sugiyama (first round)
2. (Czech Republic) Květa Peschke / (Slovenia) Katarina Srebotnik (first round)
3. (Germany) Anna-Lena Grönefeld / (Israel) Shahar Pe'er (champions)
4. (Italy) Maria Elena Camerin / (Argentina) Gisela Dulko (finals)

== Results ==
=== Key ===
- Q = Qualifier
- WC = Wild card
- LL = Lucky loser
- Alt = Alternate
- SE = Special exempt
- PR = Protected ranking
- ITF = ITF entry
- JE = Junior exempt
- w/o = Walkover
- r = Retired
- d = Defaulted
- SR = Special ranking

=== Draw ===
First round
1	(Slovakia) D Hantuchová (Japan) A Sugiyama	3	4
(Serbia and Montenegro) J Janković (India) S Uberoi	6	6
(Russia) A Kudryavtseva (Ukraine) T Luzhanska	1	3
(United States) B Mattek (India) S Mirza	6	6
4	(Italy) ME Camerin (Argentina) G Dulko	6	6
(France) N Dechy (Russia) V Zvonareva	0	2
Q	(Georgia (country)) S Devidze (Russia) T Panova	1	1
(Ukraine) A Bondarenko (Ukraine) K Bondarenko	6	6
(Canada) M Drake (Czech Republic) N Vaidišová	6	6
WC	(South Africa) K Grant (United States) L Osterloh	2	4
(Argentina) M Díaz Oliva (China) M Yuan	2	3
3	(Germany) A-L Grönefeld (Israel) S Pe'er	6	6
(Latvia) L Dekmeijere (Finland) E Laine	6^{3}	5
(United States) J Craybas (United States) M Tu	7^{7}	7
(France) M Bartoli (Poland) M Domachowska	7	7
2	(Czech Republic) K Peschke (Slovenia) K Srebotnik	5	5

Quarterfinals
(Serbia and Montenegro) J Janković (India) S Uberoi	2	2
(United States) B Mattek (India) S Mirza	6	6
4	(Italy) ME Camerin (Argentina) G Dulko	6	6
(Ukraine) A Bondarenko (Ukraine) K Bondarenko	2	2
(Canada) M Drake (Czech Republic) N Vaidišová	2	3
3	(Germany) A-L Grönefeld (Israel) S Pe'er	6	6
(United States) J Craybas (United States) M Tu	7	4	4
(France) M Bartoli (Poland) M Domachowska	5	6	6

Semifinals
(United States) B Mattek (India) S Mirza	4	3
4	(Italy) ME Camerin (Argentina) G Dulko	6	6
3	(Germany) A-L Grönefeld (Israel) S Pe'er	4	7	7^{8}
(France) M Bartoli (Poland) M Domachowska	6	5	6^{6}

Final
4	(Italy) ME Camerin (Argentina) G Dulko	1	4
3	(Germany) A-L Grönefeld (Israel) S Pe'er	6	6
