= 2005 Bank of the West Classic – Doubles =

Doubles
- 2005 Bank of the West Classic

Final
- Champions: (Zimbabwe) Cara Black (Australia) Rennae Stubbs
- Runners-up: (Russia) Elena Likhovtseva (Russia) Vera Zvonareva
- Score: 6–3, 7–5

Details
- Draw: 16
- Seeds: 4

Events
Singles	Doubles
← 2004 ·	Bank of the West Classic	· 2006 →

Eleni Daniilidou and Nicole Pratt were the defending champions, but Pratt did not compete this year. Daniilidou teamed up with Jennifer Russell and reached the quarterfinals, before being eliminated by Květa Peschke and Francesca Schiavone.

Cara Black and Rennae Stubbs won the final, defeating Elena Likhovtseva and Vera Zvonareva 6–3, 7–5 in the final.

== Seeds ==
1. (Zimbabwe) Cara Black / (Australia) Rennae Stubbs (champions)
2. (Russia) Elena Likhovtseva / (Russia) Vera Zvonareva (final)
3. (Germany) Anna-Lena Grönefeld / (United States) Meghann Shaughnessy (semifinals)
4. (United States) Lisa Raymond / (Australia) Samantha Stosur (first round)

== Draw ==
=== Key ===
- Q = Qualifier
- WC = Wild card
- LL = Lucky loser
- Alt = Alternate
- SE = Special exempt
- PR = Protected ranking
- ITF = ITF entry
- JE = Junior exempt
- w/o = Walkover
- r = Retired
- d = Defaulted
- SR = Special ranking

=== Draw ===
First round
1	(Zimbabwe) C Black (Australia) R Stubbs	6	6
WC	(Serbia and Montenegro) J Janković (Croatia) K Šprem	4	2
(Croatia) S Talaja (United States) M Washington	4	3
(Argentina) ME Salerni (Venezuela) M Vento-Kabchi	6	6
4	(United States) L Raymond (Australia) S Stosur	4	5
(Czech Republic) K Peschke (Italy) F Schiavone	6	7
(Australia) L McShea (United States) A Spears	4	6	3
(Greece) E Daniilidou (United States) J Russell	6	3	6
(Chinese Taipei) J Lee (China) S Peng	4	3
(United States) C Morariu (Switzerland) P Schnyder	6	6
(Czech Republic) I Benešová (Russia) A Jidkova	2	6	3
3	(Germany) A-L Grönefeld (United States) M Shaughnessy	6	4	6
WC	(United States) A Haynes (United States) S Perry	5	2
Q	(United States) J Craybas (United States) M Tu	7	6
(Slovakia) D Hantuchová (Japan) A Sugiyama	3	5
2	(Russia) E Likhovtseva (Russia) V Zvonareva	6	7

Quarterfinals
1	(Zimbabwe) C Black (Australia) R Stubbs	6	6
(Argentina) ME Salerni (Venezuela) M Vento-Kabchi	3	4
(Czech Republic) K Peschke (Italy) F Schiavone	6	6
(Greece) E Daniilidou (United States) J Russell	3	4
(United States) C Morariu (Switzerland) P Schnyder	6^{5}	0^{r}
3	(Germany) A-L Grönefeld (United States) M Shaughnessy	7^{7}	1
Q	(United States) J Craybas (United States) M Tu	5	3
2	(Russia) E Likhovtseva (Russia) V Zvonareva	7	6

Semifinals
1	(Zimbabwe) C Black (Australia) R Stubbs	6	2	6
(Czech Republic) K Peschke (Italy) F Schiavone	3	6	3
3	(Germany) A-L Grönefeld (United States) M Shaughnessy	3	2
2	(Russia) E Likhovtseva (Russia) V Zvonareva	6	6

Final
1	(Zimbabwe) C Black (Australia) R Stubbs	6	7
2	(Russia) E Likhovtseva (Russia) V Zvonareva	3	5
