= Anne Yelsey =

American tennis player

- Country (sports): United States
- Born: August 28, 1985 (age 40)
- Turned pro: 2002
- Plays: Right handed (two-handed backhand)
- Prize money: $42,911

Singles
- Career record: 61–54
- Career titles: 0 WTA, 1 ITF
- Highest ranking: No. 370 (18 August 2008)

Doubles
- Career record: 31–35
- Career titles: 0 WTA, 4 ITF
- Highest ranking: No. 278 (28 July 2008)

Grand Slam doubles results
- US Open: 1R (2003, 2006)

Anne Yelsey (born August 28, 1985) is an American former professional tennis player.

She has numerous ITF Women's Circuit titles. Her career high ranking is number 370 achieved on 18 August 2008. Her career high doubles ranking is 278th achieved on the 28 July 2008.

Yelsey took part in the 2007 Bank of the West Classic Doubles tournament partnering Amber Liu but lost in the first round to Katarina Srebotnik and Ai Sugiyama. She has taken part in many other ITF and WTA Tour events.

== ITF Circuit finals ==
=== Singles 3 (1–2) ===
$100,000 tournaments
$75,000 tournaments
$50,000 tournaments
$25,000 tournaments
$10,000 tournaments

Result	No.	Date	Tournament	Surface	Opponent	Score
Win	1.	6 August 2006	St. Joseph, United States	Hard	(United States) Stacey Tan	6–3, 6–3
Loss	2.	23 September 2007	Tsukuba, Japan	Hard	(Japan) Kumiko Iijima	4–6, 0–6
Loss	3.	6 April 2008	Ciudad Obregón, Mexico	Hard	(Mexico) Valeria Pulido	2–6, 7–6^{(7–3)}, 2–6

=== Doubles: 6 (4–2) ===
$100,000 tournaments
$75,000 tournaments
$50,000 tournaments
$25,000 tournaments
$10,000 tournaments

Result	No.	Date	Tournament	Surface	Partner	Opponent	Score
Loss	1.	19 May 2003	El Paso, United States	Hard	(United States) Riza Zalameda	(United States) Beau Jones (Latvia) Anžela Žguna	0–6, 6–7^{(4–7)}
Win	2.	9 July 2006	College Park, United States	Hard	(United States) Lindsey Nelson	(Chinese Taipei) Chin-Wei Chan (South Africa) Natalie Grandin	6–1, 6–3
Loss	3.	6 August 2006	St. Joseph, United States	Hard	(United States) Maureen Diaz	(United States) Christian Thompson (United States) Catrina Thompson	5–7, 6–3, 2–6
Win	4.	19 June 2007	Noto, Japan	Carpet	(Australia) Sophie Ferguson	(Japan) Natsumi Hamamura (Japan) Mari Tanaka	7–6^{(10–8)}, 6–1
Win	5.	5 August 2007	St. Joseph, United States	Hard	(United States) Whitney Deason	(United States) Amanda Craddock (United States) Whitney Mccray	6–2, 7–5
Win	6.	31 March 2008	Ciudad Obregón, Mexico	Hard	(Japan) Miki Miyamura	(Brazil) Ana Clara Duarte (Brazil) Fernanda Hermenegildo	6–0, 6–1
