= 2007 Bank of the West Classic =

- Date: July 23–29
- Edition: 36th
- Category: Tier II Series
- Surface: Hard / outdoor
- Location: Stanford, California, US
- Venue: Taube Tennis Center

Champions

Singles
- (Russia) Anna Chakvetadze

Doubles
- (India) Sania Mirza / (Israel) Shahar Pe'er
- Stanford Classic

The 2007 Bank of the West Classic was a women's tennis tournament played on outdoor hard courts. It was the 36th edition of the Bank of the West Classic, and was part of the Tier II Series of the 2007 WTA Tour. It took place at the Taube Tennis Center in Stanford, California, United States, from July 23 through July 29, 2007. First-seeded Anna Chakvetadze won the singles title.

== Finals ==
=== Singles ===
(Russia) Anna Chakvetadze defeated (India) Sania Mirza, 6–3, 6–2

- It was Chakvetadze's fourth and last singles title of the year and the sixth of her career.

=== Doubles ===
(India) Sania Mirza / (Israel) Shahar Pe'er defeated (Belarus) Victoria Azarenka / (Russia) Anna Chakvetadze, 6–4, 7–6^{(7–5)}
