= Back strain =

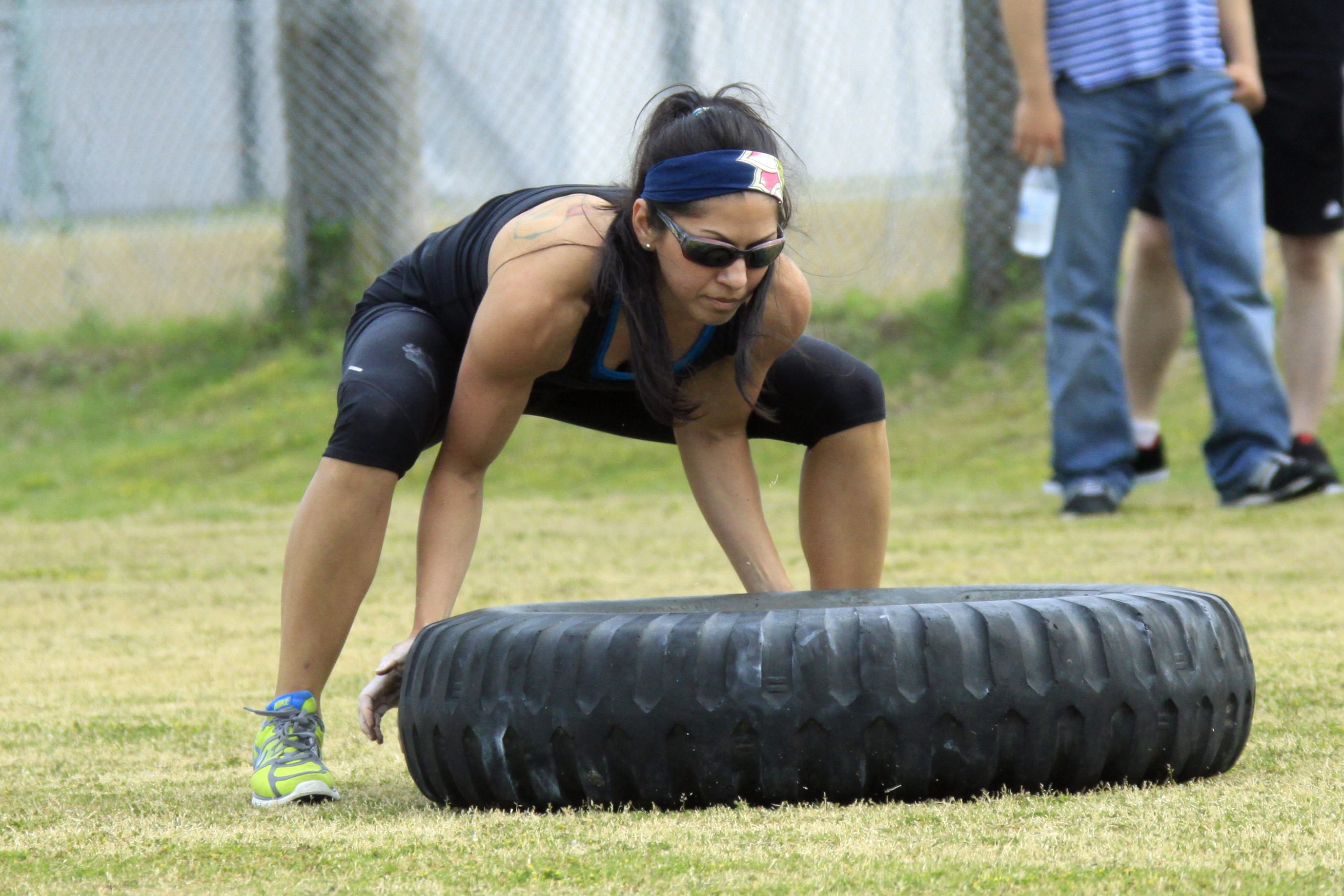
- Specialty: Family medicine

Back strain is the injury occurring to muscles or tendons. Due to back strain, the tendons and muscles supporting the spine are twisted or pulled. Chronic back strain occurs because of the sustained trauma and wearing out of the back muscles. Acute back strain can occur following a single instance of over stressing of back muscles, as in lifting a heavy object. Chronic back strain is more common than the acute type.

To avoid back strain it is important to bend the knees whenever you lift a heavy object – see partial squats.

== Signs and symptoms ==
The pain over the back is localized and does not radiate into the leg. It occurs suddenly and may be accompanied by muscle spasms. The pain is dull, aching type and decreases on rest. It may be aggravated with activity.

== Treatment ==
Back strain is treated using analgesics such as ibuprofen, rest and use of ice packs. The patient can resume activities 24–48 hours after pain and swelling is reduced. It is not recommended to have prolonged immobilization or bed rest. If the pain does not subside in two weeks, additional treatment may be required. Prevention of back strain is possible by adopting proper body mechanics while sitting, standing and lifting.
