= Lindsey Nelson (tennis) =

American tennis player

- Country (sports): United States
- Born: November 18, 1985 (age 40) Riverside, California
- Plays: Right-handed
- Prize money: $29,797

Singles
- Highest ranking: No. 424 (June 25, 2007)

Grand Slam singles results
- US Open: Q1 (2007)

Doubles
- Career titles: 2 ITF
- Highest ranking: No. 347 (October 23, 2006)

Lindsey Nelson (born November 18, 1985) is an American former professional tennis player.

== Biography ==
A right-handed player from California, Nelson attended Villa Park High School in Orange County, before going on to play college tennis for the USC Trojans.

Nelson was a two-time singles runner-up in the NCAA singles championships while playing for the Trojans and was the 2007 Pac-10 singles champion. She is a graduate of Mississippi College School of Law.

=== Professional career ===
Nelson won her first professional title in 2006, when she teamed up with Anne Yelsey to win the doubles at College Park, a top category $75,000 ITF tournament. As a singles player, Nelson had a win that year over top 100 ranked Meng Yuan in Stanford qualifying.

In 2007 she took part in the qualifying draw for the US Open and qualified for Indian Wells, by beating Abigail Spears and Stéphanie Dubois. She was beaten in the first round at Indian Wells by Croatian wildcard Mirjana Lučić.

== ITF finals ==
$75,000 tournaments
$10,000 tournaments

=== Doubles: 4 (2–2) ===
Outcome	No.	Date	Tournament	Surface	Partner	Opponents	Score
Runner-up	1.	July 2, 2006	Edmond, United States	Hard	(United States) Elizabeth Kaufman	(United States) Alexa Glatch (United States) Ashley Weinhold	4–6, 4–6
Winner	1.	July 9, 2006	College Park, United States	Hard	(United States) Anne Yelsey	(Chinese Taipei) Chan Chin-wei (South Africa) Natalie Grandin	6–1, 6–3
Winner	2.	July 18, 2009	Atlanta, United States	Hard	(United States) Kaitlyn Christian	(United States) Amanda Fink (United States) Yasmin Schnack	7–5, 7–6^{(7–2)}
Runner-up	2.	July 24, 2009	Evansville, United States	Hard	(United States) Kaitlyn Christian	(United States) Maria Sanchez (United States) Yasmin Schnack	6–4, 1–6, [4–10]
