= Taube Tennis Center =

Tennis center at Stanford University, California

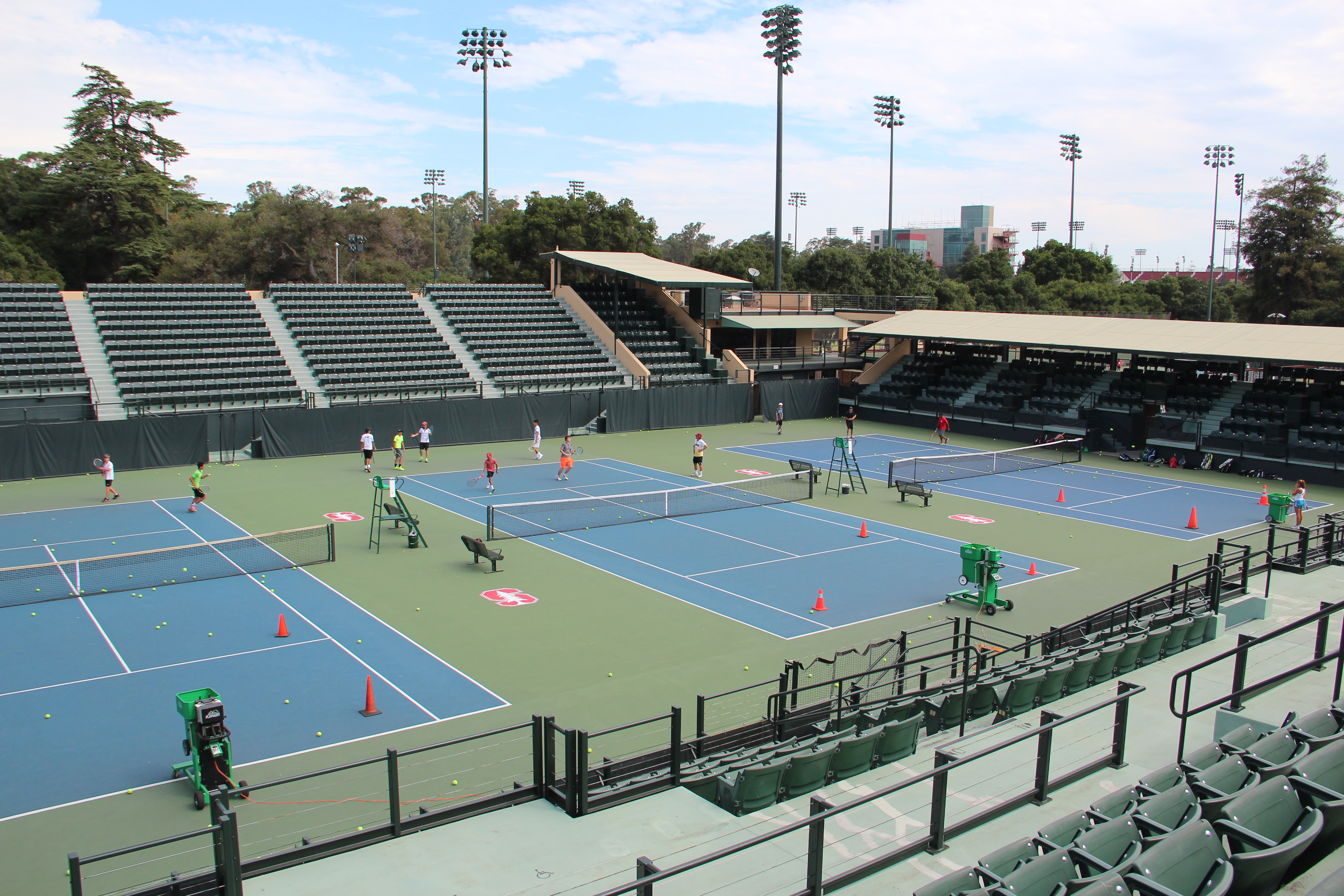
- July 2015

- Location in the United States Location in California
- Interactive map of Taube Tennis Center
- Address: 625 Campus Drive
- Location: Stanford University; Stanford, California, U.S.
- Coordinates: 37.4306°N 122.1625°W
- Owner: Stanford University
- Capacity: 2,445 – (stadium court)

Construction
- Built: 1926; 100 years ago

Tenants
- Bank of the West Classic (Tennis) (1997–2017); Fed Cup (USA vs Russia) (September 1999)

The Taube Tennis Center is an outdoor tennis facility on the west coast of the United States, located on the campus of Stanford University in Stanford, California. In addition to hosting the Stanford Cardinal's men's and women's tennis teams, the 17-court facility was the home of the Bank of the West Classic between 1997 and 2017, a WTA Tour event. The stadium court, Taube Family Tennis Stadium, has a seating capacity of 2,445 spectators.

The facility has hosted many tennis events, including the 1999 Fed Cup final, which saw the United States defeat Russia; four NCAA Women's Tennis Championships; and the first combined NCAA Women's and Men's Tennis Championships in 2006.

Since 2008, Taube has also been host to the annual USGO Gay/Lesbian tournament, held every Memorial Day weekend. See The Gay and Lesbian Tennis Alliance.

Opened 100 years ago in 1926, the site was previously occupied by Stanford Field. The approximate elevation is sixty feet (18 m) above sea level
