= Amber Liu (tennis) =

American tennis player

- Country (sports): United States
- Born: July 6, 1984 (age 42) Santa Monica, California, U.S.
- Height: 1.70 m (5 ft 7 in)
- Turned pro: 2000
- Plays: Right-handed (two-handed backhand)
- College: Stanford (2002–06)
- Prize money: US$112,326

Singles
- Career record: 85–98
- Career titles: 0 WTA, 2 ITF
- Highest ranking: No. 241 (March 3, 2008)

Grand Slam singles results
- US Open: 1R (2001, 2003, 2004)

Doubles
- Career record: 4–12
- Career titles: 0 WTA, 0 ITF
- Highest ranking: No. 600 (July 7, 2003)

Amber Liu
- Traditional Chinese: 劉安寶
- Simplified Chinese: 刘安宝
Transcriptions
Standard Mandarin
- Hanyu Pinyin: Liú Ānbǎo
- IPA: [ljǒʊ án.pàʊ]
Yue: Cantonese
- Jyutping: Lau4 Ngon1 Bou2
- IPA: [lɐw˩ ŋɔn˥.pɔw˧˥]

Amber Christine Liu Chang (born July 6, 1984) is an American former professional tennis player who is also the wife of fellow tennis pro Michael Chang. At Stanford University, she was a two-time NCAA singles champion in 2003 and 2004. Her highest ranking was World No. 241 in singles and No. 600 in doubles.

== Career ==
=== College ===
Liu attended Stanford University from 2002 to 2006, where she studied economics, interned in investment banking at Goldman Sachs, and played on the women's tennis team, compiling a 94–23 record in singles and leading the team to become NCAA team champions for three straight years, 2004 to 2006. She was a two-time NCAA singles champion in 2003 and 2004, NCAA doubles finalist in 2005, and four-time All-American. Liu was the fourth Stanford women's player to become a two-time NCAA singles champion, following Patty Fendick, Sandra Birch and Laura Granville. In 2004, she won the Honda Sports Award as the nation's best female tennis player.

=== 2005 ===
Liu injured her shoulder in the summer of 2005, which caused her ranking to drop.

=== 2008 ===
In July, Liu was invited as a wildcard to play women's singles at the Bank of the West Classic held at her alma mater Stanford University. There she played her final match as a professional, losing in the first round to fifth-seeded and World No. 13 Patty Schnyder of Switzerland.

== Personal life ==
Her parents are Marvin and Valerie Liu, both Stanford graduates. Her father is a physician and her mother is an attorney. Liu was coached by Emmanuel Udozorh and International Tennis Hall of Fame inductee Michael Chang. Chang and Liu married on October 18, 2008, and have two daughters, Lani (born December 9, 2010) and Maile (born February 2013).

== ITF Circuit finals ==
=== Singles 4 (2–2) ===
$100,000 tournaments
$75,000 tournaments
$50,000 tournaments
$25,000 tournaments
$10,000 tournaments

Outcome	No.	Date	Tournament	Surface	Opponent in the final	Score in the final
Winner	1.	17 June 2002	Montemor-o-Novo, Portugal	Hard	(Colombia) Romy Farah	6–2, 6–2
Runner-up	2.	6 July 2003	Los Gatos, United States	Hard	(United States) Shenay Perry	0–6, 5–7
Winner	3.	10 July 2006	Caracas, Venezuela	Hard	(Uruguay) Estefanía Craciún	6–3, 6–4
Runner-up	4.	31 March 2007	Hyderabad, India	Hard	(Switzerland) Stefanie Vögele	7–5, 5–7, 3–6

== See also ==
- NCAA Women's Tennis Championship
