= 2000 Bank of the West Classic – Singles =

Singles
- 2000 Bank of the West Classic

Final
- Champion: (United States) Venus Williams
- Runner-up: (United States) Lindsay Davenport
- Score: 6–1, 6–4

Details
- Draw: 28 (1WC/4Q/1LL)
- Seeds: 8

Events
Singles	Doubles
← 1999 ·	Silicon Valley Classic	· 2001 →

Lindsay Davenport was the defending champion, but lost in the final against Venus Williams in their third consecutive final at this tournament. The score was 6–1, 6–4.

== Seeds ==
The first four seeds received a bye into the second round.

1. (United States) Lindsay Davenport (final)
2. (United States) Venus Williams (champion)
3. (France) ~~Mary Pierce~~ (withdrew)
4. (United States) Monica Seles (semifinals)
5. (France) Sandrine Testud (quarterfinals)
6. (South Africa) Amanda Coetzer (second round)
7. (United States) ~~Jennifer Capriati~~ (withdrew)
8. (United States) Chanda Rubin (quarterfinals)
9. (Russia) Anna Kournikova (semifinals)
10. (United States) Amy Frazier (quarterfinals)

== Draw ==
=== Key ===
- Q = Qualifier
- WC = Wild card
- LL = Lucky loser
- Alt = Alternate
- SE = Special exempt
- PR = Protected ranking
- ITF = ITF entry
- JE = Junior exempt
- w/o = Walkover
- r = Retired
- d = Defaulted
- SR = Special ranking

=== Finals ===
Semifinals
1	(United States) Lindsay Davenport	7	7^{7}
4	(United States) Monica Seles	5	6^{2}
9	(Russia) Anna Kournikova	4	5
2	(United States) Venus Williams	6	7

Final
1	(United States) Lindsay Davenport	1	4
2	(United States) Venus Williams	6	6

=== Top half ===
First round
(Australia) N Pratt	6	6^{2}	6
(United States) M Irvin	3	7^{7}	4
Q	(United States) M Washington	7^{7}	6
LL	(Russia) A Jidkova	6^{3}	2
(Colombia) F Zuluaga	4	2
8	(United States) C Rubin	6	6
(Belgium) K Clijsters	6	6^{4}	3
(United States) M Shaughnessy	3	7^{7}	6
(Zimbabwe) C Black	6	6
(United States) E deLone	1	4
Q	(Chinese Taipei) J Lee	2	3
6	(South Africa) A Coetzer	6	6

Second round
1	(United States) L Davenport	6	6
(Australia) N Pratt	2	4
Q	(United States) M Washington	4	2
8	(United States) C Rubin	6	6
4	(United States) M Seles	7	6
(United States) M Shaughnessy	5	3
(Zimbabwe) C Black	6	6
6	(South Africa) A Coetzer	2	1

Quarterfinals
1	(United States) L Davenport	6	3	6
8	(United States) C Rubin	3	6	1
4	(United States) M Seles	6	6
(Zimbabwe) C Black	1	2

Semifinals
1	(United States) L Davenport	7	7^{7}
4	(United States) M Seles	5	6^{2}

=== Bottom half ===
First round
9	(Russia) A Kournikova	6	6
(United States) A Miller	1	2
(Canada) J Nejedly	2	6	6
Q	(Bulgaria) P Nola	6	1	0
(Italy) T Garbin	6	6
(Paraguay) R de los Ríos	0	0
10	(United States) A Frazier	6	6
WC	(United States) L Osterloh	3	3
(Hungary) R Kuti-Kis	0	3
(United States) K Brandi	6	6
Q	(Canada) M Drake	7	4	6^{3}
(Russia) T Panova	5	6	7^{7}

Second round
9	(Russia) A Kournikova	6	6
(Canada) J Nejedly	1	0
(Italy) T Garbin	2	7^{7}	5
5	(France) S Testud	6	6^{1}	7
10	(United States) A Frazier	7^{7}	6
(United States) K Brandi	6^{1}	0
(Russia) T Panova	2	2
2	(United States) V Williams	6	6

Quarterfinals
9	(Russia) A Kournikova	6	6
5	(France) S Testud	3	2
10	(United States) A Frazier	7^{7}	4	6^{5}
2	(United States) V Williams	6^{5}	6	7^{7}

Semifinals
9	(Russia) A Kournikova	4	5
2	(United States) V Williams	6	7

== Qualifying ==
=== Qualifying seeds ===
The first four seeds received a bye into the second round.

1. (Paraguay) ~~Rossana de los Ríos~~ (moved to the main draw)
2. (Russia) Alina Jidkova (qualifying competition, lucky loser)
3. (Bulgaria) Pavlina Nola (qualified)
4. (United States) Meilen Tu (second round)
5. (Canada) Maureen Drake (qualified)
6. (United States) Mashona Washington (qualified)
7. (Chinese Taipei) Janet Lee (qualified)
8. (United States) Jill Craybas (qualifying competition)
9. (Morocco) Bahia Mouhtassine (qualifying competition)

=== Qualifiers ===
1. (United States) Michaela Washington
2. (Bulgaria) Pavlina Nola
3. (Canada) Maureen Drake
4. (Chinese Taipei) Janet Lee

=== Lucky loser ===
1. (Russia) Alina Jidkova

=== Qualifying draw ===
==== First qualifier ====
First round
(San Marino) Ludmilla Varmuza	6	5	4
(United States) Gabriela Lastra	1	7	6
(Thailand) Benjamas Sangaram	2	4
WC	(United States) Alyssa Cohen	6	6
(Belgium) Sarah Pestieau	0	3
6	(United States) Mashona Washington	6	6

Second round
9	(Morocco) Bahia Mouhtassine	6	6
(United States) Gabriela Lastra	3	2
WC	(United States) Alyssa Cohen	5	1
6	(United States) Mashona Washington	7	6

Qualifying competition
9	(Morocco) Bahia Mouhtassine	6^{7}	3
6	(United States) Mashona Washington	7^{9}	6

==== Second qualifier ====
First round
(United States) Emily Marker	3	4
WC	(United States) Iwari McCalla	6	6
WC	(United States) Sandra de Silva	6	6
(South Africa) Kim Grant	2	4
(United States) Keiko Tokuda	4	1
8	(United States) Jill Craybas	6	6

Second round
3	(Bulgaria) Pavlina Nola	6	6
WC	(United States) Iwari McCalla	1	2
WC	(United States) Sandra de Silva	4	2
8	(United States) Jill Craybas	6	6

Qualifying competition
3	(Bulgaria) Pavlina Nola	6	6
8	(United States) Jill Craybas	3	3

==== Third qualifier ====
First round
5	(Canada) Maureen Drake	7^{8}	6
(United States) Amanda Augustus	6^{6}	4
(Canada) Marie-Ève Pelletier	6	6
WC	(United States) Laxmi Poruri	1	2

Second round
5	(Canada) Maureen Drake	6	6
WC	(United States) Amy Jensen	1	2
(Canada) Marie-Ève Pelletier	4	6	6
4	(United States) Meilen Tu	6	3	3

Qualifying competition
5	(Canada) Maureen Drake	5	7	6
(Canada) Marie-Ève Pelletier	7	5	0

==== Fourth qualifier ====
First round
7	(Chinese Taipei) Janet Lee	6	6
(United Kingdom) Monique Javer	0	1
(United States) Melissa Mazzotta	1	0^{r}
(United States) Leslie Cavanaugh	6	2
(United Kingdom) Joanne Moore	6	6
WC	(Canada) Martina Nejedly	1	4

Second round
7	(Chinese Taipei) Janet Lee	6	6
(United States) Leslie Cavanaugh	2	0
(United Kingdom) Joanne Moore	5	5
2	(Russia) Alina Jidkova	7	7

Qualifying competition
7	(Chinese Taipei) Janet Lee	3	7^{10}	6
2	(Russia) Alina Jidkova	6	6^{8}	2
