= 2002 Bank of the West Classic – Doubles =

Doubles
- 2002 Bank of the West Classic

Final
- Champions: (United States) Lisa Raymond (Australia) Rennae Stubbs
- Runners-up: (Slovakia) Janette Husárová (Spain) Conchita Martínez
- Score: 6–1, 6–1

Details
- Draw: 16 (1WC/1Q/1LL)
- Seeds: 4

Events
Singles	Doubles
← 2001 ·	Silicon Valley Classic	· 2003 →

Janet Lee and Wynne Prakusya were the defending champions, but lost in the first round to Jelena Dokic and Tamarine Tanasugarn.

Lisa Raymond and Rennae Stubbs won the title by defeating Janette Husárová and Conchita Martínez 6–1, 6–1 in the final.

== Seeds ==
1. (United States) Lisa Raymond / (Australia) Rennae Stubbs (champions)
2. (United States) Kimberly Po-Messerli / (Japan) Ai Sugiyama (first round)
3. (Russia) Anna Kournikova / (United States) Meghann Shaughnessy (semifinals)
4. (Chinese Taipei) Janet Lee / (Indonesia) Wynne Prakusya (first round)

== Draw ==
=== Key ===
- Q = Qualifier
- WC = Wild card
- LL = Lucky loser
- Alt = Alternate
- SE = Special exempt
- PR = Protected ranking
- ITF = ITF entry
- JE = Junior exempt
- w/o = Walkover
- r = Retired
- d = Defaulted
- SR = Special ranking

=== Draw ===
First round
1	(United States) L Raymond (Australia) R Stubbs	6	6
(South Africa) K Grant (Venezuela) M Vento-Kabchi	1	1
(Italy) R Grande (Argentina) P Tarabini	7	6
WC	(United States) L Kalvaria (United States) G Lastra	5	2
3	(Russia) A Kournikova (United States) M Shaughnessy	6	6
LL	(United States) J Craybas (United States) S Taylor	4	0
(United States) A Frazier (United States) A Spears	6	7
(Luxembourg) A Kremer (United States) M Tu	2	5
(Germany) V Henke (Russia) T Panova	3	1
(Slovakia) J Husárová (Spain) C Martínez	6	6
(Federal Republic of Yugoslavia) J Dokic (Thailand) T Tanasugarn	7^{7}	6
4	(Chinese Taipei) J Lee (Indonesia) W Prakusya	6^{3}	3
(France) A Fusai (Netherlands) C Vis	3	7^{7}	6^{0}
Q	(United States) L Granville (United States) J Hopkins	6	6^{5}	7^{7}
(United States) A Augustus (United States) B Rippner	7	6
2	(United States) K Po-Messerli (Japan) A Sugiyama	5	3

Quarterfinals
1	(United States) L Raymond (Australia) R Stubbs	6	6
(Italy) R Grande (Argentina) P Tarabini	3	1
3	(Russia) A Kournikova (United States) M Shaughnessy	6	6
(United States) A Frazier (United States) A Spears	1	4
(Slovakia) J Husárová (Spain) C Martínez	6	6
(Federal Republic of Yugoslavia) J Dokic (Thailand) T Tanasugarn	2	3
Q	(United States) L Granville (United States) J Hopkins	6	3	4
(United States) A Augustus (United States) B Rippner	3	6	6

Semifinals
1	(United States) L Raymond (Australia) R Stubbs	w/o
3	(Russia) A Kournikova (United States) M Shaughnessy
(Slovakia) J Husárová (Spain) C Martínez	6	6
(United States) A Augustus (United States) B Rippner	4	1

Final
1	(United States) L Raymond (Australia) R Stubbs	6	6
(Slovakia) J Husárová (Spain) C Martínez	1	1

== Qualifying ==
=== Qualifying seeds ===
1. (United States) Marissa Irvin / (United States) Alexandra Stevenson (first round)
2. (United States) Laura Granville / (United States) Jennifer Hopkins (qualified)

=== Qualifiers ===
1. (United States) Laura Granville / (United States) Jennifer Hopkins

=== Lucky losers ===
1. (United States) Jill Craybas / (United States) Sarah Taylor

=== Qualifying draw ===
First round
1	(United States) Marissa Irvin (United States) Alexandra Stevenson	6
(United States) Jill Craybas (United States) Sarah Taylor	8
(United States) Teryn Ashley (United States) Kristina Brandi	6
2	(United States) Laura Granville (United States) Jennifer Hopkins	8

Qualifying competition
(United States) Jill Craybas (United States) Sarah Taylor	1	1
2	(United States) Laura Granville (United States) Jennifer Hopkins	6	6
