= 2000 Bank of the West Classic – Doubles =

Doubles
- 2000 Bank of the West Classic

Final
- Champions: (United States) Chanda Rubin (France) Sandrine Testud
- Runners-up: (Zimbabwe) Cara Black (United States) Amy Frazier
- Score: 6–4, 6–4

Details
- Draw: 16 (1Q/1LL)
- Seeds: 4

Events
| Singles | Doubles |
| ← 1999 · | Silicon Valley Classic | · 2001 → |

Lindsay Davenport and Corina Morariu were the defending champions, but neither competed this year.

Chanda Rubin and Sandrine Testud won the title by defeating Cara Black and Amy Frazier 6–4, 6–4 in the final.

== Seeds ==
1. (United States) Chanda Rubin / (France) Sandrine Testud (champions)
2. (United States) Debbie Graham / (United States) Kimberly Po (semifinals)
3. (South Africa) Amanda Coetzer / (United States) Lori McNeil (quarterfinals)
4. (Zimbabwe) Cara Black / (United States) Amy Frazier (final)

== Draw ==
=== Key ===
- Q = Qualifier
- WC = Wild card
- LL = Lucky loser
- Alt = Alternate
- SE = Special exempt
- PR = Protected ranking
- ITF = ITF entry
- JE = Junior exempt
- w/o = Walkover
- r = Retired
- d = Defaulted
- SR = Special ranking

=== Draw ===
First round
1 | (United States) C Rubin (France) S Testud | 6 | 6
(South Africa) K Grant (Thailand) B Sangaram | 0 | 2
(Morocco) B Mouhtassine (Canada) MÈ Pelletier | 6 | 3 | 4
(Russia) A Jidkova (United States) M Washington | 4 | 6 | 6
3 | (South Africa) A Coetzer (United States) L McNeil | 6 | 6
(United States) M Mazzotta (Colombia) F Zuluaga | 3 | 3
(Belgium) K Clijsters (United States) M Shaughnessy | 6 | 7^{7}
(Canada) M Drake (Russia) T Panova | 1 | 6^{4}
Q | (Canada) J Nejedly (United States) M Tu | 6^{5} | 6 | 4
LL | (United States) G Lastra (United States) Keiko Tokuda | 7^{7} | 4 | 6
(United States) A Augustus (United States) A Jensen | 4 | 2
4 | (Zimbabwe) C Black (United States) A Frazier | 6 | 6
(Hungary) R Kuti-Kis (Bulgaria) P Nola | 5 | 3
(United States) E deLone (Australia) N Pratt | 7 | 6
(Italy) T Garbin (Chinese Taipei) J Lee | 2 | 6^{5}
2 | (United States) D Graham (United States) K Po | 6 | 7^{7}

Quarterfinals
1 | (United States) C Rubin (France) S Testud | 6 | 6
(Russia) A Jidkova (United States) M Washington | 2 | 4
3 | (South Africa) A Coetzer (United States) L McNeil | 6^{5} | 3
(Belgium) K Clijsters (United States) M Shaughnessy | 7^{7} | 6
LL | (United States) G Lastra (United States) Keiko Tokuda | 3 | 1
4 | (Zimbabwe) C Black (United States) A Frazier | 6 | 6
(United States) E deLone (Australia) N Pratt | 3 | 6^{4}
2 | (United States) D Graham (United States) K Po | 6 | 7^{7}

Semifinals
1 | (United States) C Rubin (France) S Testud | 6 | 3 | 6
(Belgium) K Clijsters (United States) M Shaughnessy | 4 | 6 | 3
4 | (Zimbabwe) C Black (United States) A Frazier | 2 | 6 | 7
2 | (United States) D Graham (United States) K Po | 6 | 2 | 5

Final
1 | (United States) C Rubin (France) S Testud | 6 | 6
4 | (Zimbabwe) C Black (United States) A Frazier | 4 | 4

== Qualifying ==
=== Qualifying seeds ===
1. (Canada) Jana Nejedly / (United States) Meilen Tu (qualified)
2. (United States) Jill Craybas / (United Kingdom) Joanne Moore (first round)

=== Qualifiers ===
1. (Canada) Jana Nejedly / (United States) Meilen Tu

=== Lucky losers ===
1. (United States) Gabriela Lastra / (United States) Keiko Tokuda

=== Qualifying draw ===
First round
1 | (Canada) Jana Nejedly (United States) Meilen Tu | 8
(United States) Sandra De Silva (United States) Kristine Kurth | 1
WC | (United States) Gabriela Lastra (United States) Keiko Tokuda | 8
2 | (United States) Jill Craybas (United Kingdom) Joanne Moore | 5

Qualifying competition
1 | (Canada) Jana Nejedly (United States) Meilen Tu | 6 | 4 | 6
WC | (United States) Gabriela Lastra (United States) Keiko Tokuda | 1 | 6 | 4
