= 2001 Bank of the West Classic – Doubles =

Doubles
- 2001 Bank of the West Classic

Final
- Champions: (Chinese Taipei) Janet Lee (Indonesia) Wynne Prakusya
- Runners-up: (United States) Nicole Arendt (Netherlands) Caroline Vis
- Score: 3–6, 6–3, 6–3

Events
Singles	Doubles
← 2000 ·	Stanford Classic	· 2002 →

Chanda Rubin and Sandrine Testud were the defending champions, but none competed this year. Rubin decided to focus on the singles tournament, while Testud decided to rest after competing on the World Group play-offs of the Fed Cup.

Janet Lee and Wynne Prakusya won the title by defeating Nicole Arendt and Caroline Vis 3–6, 6–3, 6–3 in the final.

== Seeds ==
1. (United States) ~~Kimberly Po-Messerli~~ / (Australia) ~~Nicole Pratt~~ (withdrew)
2. (United States) Nicole Arendt / (Netherlands) Caroline Vis (final)
3. (France) Alexandra Fusai / (Italy) Rita Grande (semifinals)
4. (United States) Monica Seles / (United States) Meghann Shaughnessy (semifinals)

== Draw ==
=== Key ===
- Q = Qualifier
- WC = Wild card
- LL = Lucky loser
- Alt = Alternate
- SE = Special exempt
- PR = Protected ranking
- ITF = ITF entry
- JE = Junior exempt
- w/o = Walkover
- r = Retired
- d = Defaulted
- SR = Special ranking

=== Draw ===
First round
LL	(Republic of Ireland) K Liggan (Australia) B Stewart	7	6
(Japan) R Hiraki (United States) L Osterloh	5	1
(Chinese Taipei) J Lee (Indonesia) W Prakusya	4	6	6
Q	(United States) A Spears (United States) J Watanabe	6	2	3
4	(United States) M Seles (United States) M Shaughnessy	6	6
(Russia) A Jidkova (United States) M Tu	1	2
(Germany) V Henke (Ukraine) T Perebiynis	4	6^{6}
(United States) A Augustus (United States) J Embry	6	7^{8}
(United States) E deLone (Australia) A Ellwood	7	7^{7}
(Zimbabwe) C Black (United States) M Washington	5	6^{1}
(South Africa) K Grant (Canada) R Kolbovic	3	5
3	(France) A Fusai (Italy) R Grande	6	7
(United States) A Frazier (Argentina) P Tarabini	5	3
WC	(Czech Republic) D Bedáňová (Russia) E Bovina	7	6
(United States) S Reeves (Germany) M Weingärtner	6^{9}	3
2	(United States) N Arendt (Netherlands) C Vis	7^{11}	6

Quarterfinals
LL	(Republic of Ireland) K Liggan (Australia) B Stewart	4	6^{3}
(Chinese Taipei) J Lee (Indonesia) W Prakusya	6	7^{7}
4	(United States) M Seles (United States) M Shaughnessy	6	6
(United States) A Augustus (United States) J Embry	3	3
(United States) E deLone (Australia) A Ellwood	4	4
3	(France) A Fusai (Italy) R Grande	6	6
WC	(Czech Republic) D Bedáňová (Russia) E Bovina	6	4	1
2	(United States) N Arendt (Netherlands) C Vis	3	6	6

Semifinals
(Chinese Taipei) J Lee (Indonesia) W Prakusya	5	7^{7}	6
4	(United States) M Seles (United States) M Shaughnessy	7	6^{5}	4
3	(France) A Fusai (Italy) R Grande	4	1
2	(United States) N Arendt (Netherlands) C Vis	6	6

Final
(Chinese Taipei) J Lee (Indonesia) W Prakusya	3	6	6
2	(United States) N Arendt (Netherlands) C Vis	6	3	3
