= 2002 Bank of the West Classic – Singles =

Singles
- 2002 Bank of the West Classic

Final
- Champion: (United States) Venus Williams
- Runner-up: (Belgium) Kim Clijsters
- Score: 6–3, 6–3

Details
- Draw: 28 (3WC/4Q/1LL)
- Seeds: 8

Events
| Singles | Doubles |
- Silicon Valley Classic

Kim Clijsters was the defending champion, but lost in the final to Venus Williams. The score was 6–3, 6–3.

== Seeds ==
The first four seeds received a bye into the second round.

1. (United States) Venus Williams (champion)
2. (United States) Lindsay Davenport (semifinals)
3. (United States) Monica Seles (quarterfinals)
4. (Belgium) Kim Clijsters (final)
5. (Federal Republic of Yugoslavia) Jelena Dokic (quarterfinals)
6. (Belgium) Justine Henin (first round)
7. (Czech Republic) Dája Bedáňová (second round)
8. (Israel) Anna Smashnova (first round)

== Draw ==
Key

- Q = Qualifier
- WC = Wild card
- LL = Lucky loser
- Alt = Alternate
- ITF = ITF entry
- PR = Protected ranking
- SR = Special ranking
- SE = Special exempt
- JE = Junior exempt
- JR = Junior Accelerator Programme entrant
- CO = College Accelerator Programme entrant
- NG = Next Gen Accelerator Program entrant
- w/o = Walkover
- r = Retired
- d = Defaulted

=== Finals ===
Semifinals
1 | (United States) Venus Williams | 6 | 6
(United States) Lisa Raymond | 3 | 0
4 | (Belgium) Kim Clijsters | 4 | 6 | 6
2 | (United States) Lindsay Davenport | 6 | 4 | 2

Final
1 | (United States) Venus Williams | 6 | 6
4 | (Belgium) Kim Clijsters | 3 | 3

=== Top half ===
First round
(United States) M Shaughnessy | 7^{7} | 6
Q | (Croatia) M Lučić | 6^{5} | 3
(Switzerland) MG Mikaelian | 1 | 6 | 3
Q | (Indonesia) W Prakusya | 6 | 3 | 6
(Russia) A Kournikova | 6 | 6
8 | (Israel) A Smashnova | 3 | 2
(Slovakia) J Husárová | 4 | 6 | 4
(Thailand) T Tanasugarn | 6 | 4 | 6
(Japan) A Sugiyama | 4 | 7^{7} | 1
(United States) L Raymond | 6 | 6^{3} | 6
Q | (United States) M Irvin | 6 | 4 | 6
6 | (Belgium) J Henin | 3 | 6 | 1

Second round
1 | (United States) V Williams | 6 | 6
(United States) M Shaughnessy | 4 | 1
Q | (Indonesia) W Prakusya | 5 | 4
(Russia) A Kournikova | 7 | 6
3 | (United States) M Seles | 6 | 3 | 6
(Thailand) T Tanasugarn | 4 | 6 | 1
(United States) L Raymond | 6 | 6
Q | (United States) M Irvin | 1 | 4

Quarterfinals
1 | (United States) V Williams | 6 | 6
(Russia) A Kournikova | 3 | 4
3 | (United States) M Seles | 4 | 2
(United States) L Raymond | 6 | 6

Semifinals
1 | (United States) V Williams | 6 | 6
(United States) L Raymond | 3 | 0

=== Bottom half ===
First round
7 | (Czech Republic) D Bedáňová | 6 | 6
(Russia) T Panova | 3 | 4
LL | (United States) S Taylor | 1 | 1
WC | (Federal Republic of Yugoslavia) J Janković | 6 | 6
(United States) A Stevenson | 6^{5} | 4
(United States) M Tu | 7^{7} | 6
5 | (Federal Republic of Yugoslavia) J Dokic | 6 | 7
(United States) A Frazier | 3 | 5
WC | (United States) L Granville | 3 | 3
WC | (Spain) C Martínez | 6 | 6
(Italy) R Grande | 5 | 2
Q | (Luxembourg) A Kremer | 7 | 6

Second round
7 | (Czech Republic) D Bedáňová | 6^{8} | 6 | 3
WC | (Federal Republic of Yugoslavia) J Janković | 7^{10} | 2 | 6
(United States) M Tu | 5 | 2
4 | (Belgium) K Clijsters | 7 | 6
5 | (Federal Republic of Yugoslavia) J Dokic | 1 | 6 | 6
WC | (Spain) C Martínez | 6 | 0 | 1
Q | (Luxembourg) A Kremer | 3 | 0
2 | (United States) L Davenport | 6 | 6

Quarterfinals
WC | (Federal Republic of Yugoslavia) J Janković | 5 | 3
4 | (Belgium) K Clijsters | 7 | 6
5 | (Federal Republic of Yugoslavia) J Dokic | 2 | 2
2 | (United States) L Davenport | 6 | 6

Semifinals
4 | (Belgium) K Clijsters | 4 | 6 | 6
2 | (United States) L Davenport | 6 | 4 | 2

== Qualifying ==
=== Qualifying seeds ===
The first six seeds received a bye into the second round.

1. (Luxembourg) Anne Kremer (qualified)
2. (United States) Marissa Irvin (qualified)
3. (United States) Jennifer Hopkins (second round)
4. (United States) Jill Craybas (second round)
5. (Germany) Gréta Arn (second round)
6. (Indonesia) Wynne Prakusya (qualified)
7. (United States) Sarah Taylor (qualifying competition, lucky loser)
8. (Chinese Taipei) Janet Lee (qualifying competition)

=== Qualifiers ===
1. (Luxembourg) Anne Kremer
2. (United States) Marissa Irvin
3. (Indonesia) Wynne Prakusya
4. (Croatia) Mirjana Lučić

=== Lucky loser ===
1. (United States) Sarah Taylor

=== Qualifying draw ===
==== First qualifier ====
First round
(United States) Ansley Cargill | 4 | 5
(United States) Brie Rippner | 6 | 7
WC | (Argentina) Patricia Tarabini
WC | (United States) Jessyca Arthur | w/o
(Mexico) Melissa Torres Sandoval | 2 | 2
8 | (Chinese Taipei) Janet Lee | 6 | 6

Second round
1/WC | (Luxembourg) Anne Kremer | 6 | 6
(United States) Brie Rippner | 1 | 2
WC | (United States) Jessyca Arthur | 3 | 0
8 | (Chinese Taipei) Janet Lee | 6 | 6

Qualifying competition
1/WC | (Luxembourg) Anne Kremer | 6 | 6
8 | (Chinese Taipei) Janet Lee | 0 | 2

==== Second qualifier ====
First round
(United States) Leslie Cavanaugh | 0 | 1
(United States) Jane Chi | 6 | 6
(United States) Abigail Spears | 3 | 6^{5}
(United States) Lindsay Lee-Waters | 6 | 7^{7}
WC | (United States) Iwalani McCalla | 0 | 1
7 | (United States) Sarah Taylor | 6 | 6

Second round
2 | (United States) Marissa Irvin | 6 | 6
(United States) Jane Chi | 2 | 3
(United States) Lindsay Lee-Waters | 5 | 5
7 | (United States) Sarah Taylor | 7 | 7

Qualifying competition
2 | (United States) Marissa Irvin | 6 | 6
7 | (United States) Sarah Taylor | 1 | 3

==== Third qualifier ====
First round
WC | (United States) Megan Falcon | 6 | 2 | 2
(Venezuela) María Vento-Kabchi | 4 | 6 | 6
(Germany) Vanessa Henke | 6 | 7
(South Africa) Kim Grant | 0 | 5

Second round
3 | (United States) Jennifer Hopkins | 6 | 1 | 6^{5}
(Venezuela) María Vento-Kabchi | 2 | 6 | 7^{7}
(Germany) Vanessa Henke | 1 | 3
6 | (Indonesia) Wynne Prakusya | 6 | 6

Qualifying competition
(Venezuela) María Vento-Kabchi | 5 | 6^{7}
6 | (Indonesia) Wynne Prakusya | 7 | 7^{9}

==== Fourth qualifier ====
First round
(United States) Amanda Augustus | 0 | 1
(Puerto Rico) Kristina Brandi | 6 | 6
(Croatia) Mirjana Lučić | 6 | 6
(United States) Teryn Ashley | 4 | 4

Second round
4 | (United States) Jill Craybas | 4 | 1
(Puerto Rico) Kristina Brandi | 6 | 6
(Croatia) Mirjana Lučić | 6 | 6
5 | (Germany) Gréta Arn | 1 | 1

Qualifying competition
(Puerto Rico) Kristina Brandi | 4 | 6^{4}
(Croatia) Mirjana Lučić | 6 | 7^{7}
