= 2000 Indian Wells Masters – Women's singles =

Women's singles
- 2000 Indian Wells Masters

Final
- Champion: (United States) Lindsay Davenport
- Runner-up: (Switzerland) Martina Hingis
- Score: 4–6, 6–4, 6–0

Details
- Draw: 80 (6WC/8Q/2LL)
- Seeds: 16

Events
Singles	men	women
Doubles	men	women
← 1999 ·	Indian Wells Masters	· 2001 →

Lindsay Davenport defeated Martina Hingis in the final, 4–6, 6–4, 6–0 to win the women's singles tennis title at the 2000 Indian Wells Masters.

Serena Williams was the defending champion, but lost in the quarterfinals to Mary Pierce in a rematch of the last year's quarterfinal.

== Seeds ==
A champion seed is indicated in bold text while text in italics indicates the round in which that seed was eliminated.

1. (Switzerland) Martina Hingis (final)
2. (United States) **Lindsay Davenport (champion)**
3. (United States) Serena Williams (quarterfinals)
4. (France) Nathalie Tauziat (second round)
5. (France) Mary Pierce (semifinals)
6. (Spain) Conchita Martínez (quarterfinals)
7. (United States) Monica Seles (quarterfinals)
8. (Russia) Anna Kournikova (second round)
9. (France) Julie Halard-Decugis (third round)
10. (Austria) Barbara Schett (third round)
11. (France) Sandrine Testud (second round)
12. (United States) Jennifer Capriati (first round)
13. (France) Amélie Mauresmo (first round, retired)
14. (Germany) Anke Huber (first round)
15. (South Africa) Amanda Coetzer (first round)
16. (Russia) Elena Likhovtseva (third round)

== Draw ==
=== Key ===
- Q = Qualifier
- WC = Wild card
- LL = Lucky loser
- Alt = Alternate
- SE = Special exempt
- PR = Protected ranking
- ITF = ITF entry
- JE = Junior exempt
- w/o = Walkover
- r = Retired
- d = Defaulted
- SR = Special ranking

=== Finals ===
Quarterfinals
1	(Switzerland) **Martina Hingis**	**6**	**6**
7	(United States) Monica Seles	3	1
3	(United States) Serena Williams	2	1
5	(France) **Mary Pierce**	**6**	**6**
(Russia) **Elena Dementieva**	**6**	**6**
(United States) Chanda Rubin	4	1
6	(Spain) Conchita Martínez	2	1
2	(United States) **Lindsay Davenport**	**6**	**6**

Semifinals
1	(Switzerland) **Martina Hingis**	**6**	**6**
5	(France) Mary Pierce	4	2
(Russia) Elena Dementieva	2	1
2	(United States) **Lindsay Davenport**	**6**	**6**

Final
1	(Switzerland) Martina Hingis	**6**	4	0
2	(United States) **Lindsay Davenport**	4	**6**	**6**

=== Top half ===
==== Section 1 ====
First round
WC	**(Belarus) O Barabanschikova**	**6**	**6**
Q	(Germany) M Weingärtner	1	1
Q	(Russia) A Jidkova	4	3
(Poland) **M Grzybowska**	**6**	**6**

Second round
1	(Switzerland) **M Hingis**	**6**	**6**
(United States) A Frazier	3	3
WC	(Belarus) O Barabanschikova	**6**	4	3
(Japan) **A Sugiyama**	3	**6**	**6**
(Israel) A Smashnova	6^{5}	2
(Poland) **M Grzybowska**	**7^{7}**	**6**
(United States) K Brandi	1	2
10	(Austria) **B Schett**	**6**	**6**

Third round
1	(Switzerland) **M Hingis**	**6**	**6**
(Japan) A Sugiyama	1	2
(Poland) M Grzybowska	2	1
10	(Austria) **B Schett**	**6**	**6**

Fourth round
1	(Switzerland) **M Hingis**	**6**	**6**
10	(Austria) B Schett	1	1

==== Section 2 ====
First round
WC	(United States) **T Snyder**	**6**	4
(France) A Cocheteux	2	1	r
Q	(United States) **M Irvin**	2	**7^{9}**	**6**
(Thailand) T Tanasugarn	**6**	6^{7}	1

Second round
12	(United States) J Capriati	**7**	1	2
(Zimbabwe) **C Black**	5	**6**	**6**
(Belgium) **S Appelmans**	**6**	**7^{9}**
WC	(United States) T Snyder	2	6^{7}
Q	(United States) M Irvin	2	1
(Switzerland) **P Schnyder**	**6**	**6**
(Italy) S Farina	1	2
7	(United States) **M Seles**	**6**	**6**

Third round
(Zimbabwe) C Black	3	6^{5}
(Belgium) **S Appelmans**	**6**	**7^{7}**
(Switzerland) P Schnyder	0	3
7	(United States) **M Seles**	**6**	**6**

Fourth round
(Belgium) S Appelmans	**6**	2	3
7	(United States) **M Seles**	3	**6**	**6**

==== Section 3 ====
First round
Q	(Canada) J Nejedly	3	**6**	6^{6}
(Argentina) **P Suárez**	**6**	3	**7^{8}**
(Italy) **R Grande**	**6**	**6**
(Russia) A Myskina	2	4

Second round
3	(United States) **S Williams**	**7**	3	**6**
(United States) A Stevenson	5	**6**	2
(Argentina) P Suárez	1	6^{4}
(Italy) **R Grande**	**6**	**7^{7}**
(Australia) N Pratt	4	4
(Russia) **T Panova**	**6**	**6**
(Belgium) **K Clijsters**	3
13	(France) A Mauresmo	0	r

Third round
3	(United States) **S Williams**	4	**6**	**6**
(Italy) R Grande	**6**	1	2
(Russia) T Panova	3	6^{6}
(Belgium) **K Clijsters**	**6**	**7^{8}**

Fourth round
3	(United States) **S Williams**	**6**	**6**
(Belgium) K Clijsters	4	4

==== Section 4 ====
First round
Q	(Chinese Taipei) **J Lee**	**6**	**6**
WC	(United States) H Parkinson	2	3
Q	(Canada) **S Jeyaseelan**	**6**	**6**
WC	(South Africa) J Steck	1	2

Second round
16	(Russia) **E Likhovtseva**	**6**	6^{5}	**7**
(Austria) S Plischke	4	**7^{7}**	5
Q	(Chinese Taipei) J Lee	2	4
(Croatia) **M Lučić**	**6**	**6**
(United States) **C Morariu**	**6**	**6**
(Spain) C Torrens Valero	2	2
Q	(Canada) S Jeyaseelan	1	3
5	(France) **M Pierce**	**6**	**6**

Third round
16	(Russia) **E Likhovtseva**	2	**6**	**7**
(Croatia) M Lučić	**6**	4	5
(United States) C Morariu	2	**6**	2
5	(France) **M Pierce**	**6**	4	**6**

Fourth round
16	(Russia) E Likhovtseva	3	**7**	5
5	(France) **M Pierce**	**6**	5	**7**

=== Bottom half ===
==== Section 5 ====
First round
WC	(Czech Republic) **D Bedáňová**	4	**7**	**6**
Q	(Slovenia) T Pisnik	**6**	5	3
(Russia) **E Dementieva**	**6**	**6**
(Slovenia) K Srebotnik	0	3

Second round
8	(Russia) **A Kournikova**	**7**	**6**
(Czech Republic) D Chládková	5	2
LL	(United States) M Shaughnessy	5	6^{5}
(France) **N Dechy**	**7**	**7^{7}**
WC	(Czech Republic) D Bedáňová	3	4
(Spain) **M Serna**	**6**	**6**
(Russia) **E Dementieva**	**6**	4	**6**
14	(Germany) A Huber	4	**6**	4

Third round
8	(Russia) A Kournikova	5	**7**	6^{5}
(France) **N Dechy**	**7**	5	**7^{7}**
(Spain) M Serna	**6**	4	4
(Russia) **E Dementieva**	4	**6**	**6**

Fourth round
(France) N Dechy	6^{2}	2
(Russia) **E Dementieva**	**7^{7}**	**6**

==== Section 6 ====
First round
(United States) E deLone	0	1
(Canada) **M Drake**	**6**	**6**
(Slovakia) **K Habšudová**	**7^{7}**	**7**
Q	(United States) B Rippner	6^{5}	5

Second round
11	(France) **S Testud**	5	**6**	**6**
(France) S Pitkowski	**7**	2	4
(Canada) M Drake	**7^{7}**	3	4
(United States) **C Rubin**	6^{5}	**6**	**6**
(Luxembourg) A Kremer	6^{5}	4
(Slovakia) **K Habšudová**	**7^{7}**	**6**
(France) A-G Sidot	2	4
4	(France) **N Tauziat**	**6**	**6**

Third round
11	(France) S Testud	4	**6**	2
(United States) **C Rubin**	**6**	2	**6**
(Slovakia) **K Habšudová**	**6**	**6**
4	(France) N Tauziat	4	4

Fourth round
(United States) **C Rubin**	**6**	**6**
(Slovakia) K Habšudová	0	1

==== Section 7 ====
First round
(Bulgaria) **M Maleeva**	**6**	**6**
(Spain) M Sánchez Lorenzo	2	2
(Slovakia) H Nagyová	3	4
(Switzerland) **E Gagliardi**	**6**	**6**

Second round
6	(Spain) **C Martínez**	**6**	**6**
(Bulgaria) M Maleeva	3	3
(Australia) **J Dokić**	5	**7**	**6**
(Croatia) S Talaja	**7**	5	1
(Spain) G León García	**6**	2	2
(Switzerland) **E Gagliardi**	4	**6**	**6**
(Belgium) **D van Roost**	1	**6**	**6**
15	(South Africa) A Coetzer	**6**	4	1

Third round
6	(Spain) **C Martínez**	**6**	**7^{7}**
(Australia) J Dokić	2	6^{4}
(Switzerland) E Gagliardi	**6**	3	0
(Belgium) **D van Roost**	4	**6**	**6**

Fourth round
6	(Spain) **C Martínez**	**6**	3
(Belgium) D van Roost	0	0	r

==== Section 8 ====
First round
(Spain) **Á Montolio**	**6**	**6**
(Czech Republic) S Kleinová	2	4
LL	(Hungary) R Kuti-Kis	**6**	4	3
WC	(United States) **L Osterloh**	4	**6**	**6**

Second round
9	(France) **J Halard-Decugis**	2	**6**	**6**
(Spain) Á Montolio	**6**	2	2
WC	(United States) L Osterloh	3	3
(Romania) **R Dragomir**	**6**	**6**
(Belarus) **N Zvereva**	1	**6**	**6**
(United States) L Raymond	**6**	3	2
(Romania) I Spîrlea	0	1
2	(United States) **L Davenport**	**6**	**6**

Third round
9	(France) **J Halard-Decugis**	**6**	4	**6**
(Romania) R Dragomir	3	**6**	3
(Belarus) N Zvereva	4	2
2	(United States) **L Davenport**	**6**	**6**

Fourth round
9	(France) J Halard-Decugis	2	1
2	(United States) **L Davenport**	**6**	**6**

== Qualifying ==
=== Qualifying seeds ===
1. (Hungary) Rita Kuti-Kis (qualifying competition, **Lucky loser**)
2. (Netherlands) Kristie Boogert (first round)
3. (Slovenia) **Tina Pisnik (qualified)**
4. (Canada) **Sonya Jeyaseelan (qualified)**
5. (United States) Meghann Shaughnessy (qualifying competition, **Lucky loser**)
6. (Germany) **Marlene Weingärtner (qualified)**
7. (South Africa) Mariaan de Swardt (first round)
8. (Belgium) Els Callens (first round)

=== Qualifiers ===
1. (Canada) **Jana Nejedly**
2. (Chinese Taipei) **Janet Lee**
3. (Canada) **Sonya Jeyaseelan**
4. (United States) **Brie Rippner**
5. (Germany) **Marlene Weingärtner**
6. (Slovenia) **Tina Pisnik**
7. (United States) **Marissa Irvin**
8. (Russia) **Alina Jidkova**

=== Lucky losers ===
1. (Hungary) **Rita Kuti-Kis**
2. (United States) **Meghann Shaughnessy**

=== Qualifying draw ===
==== First qualifier ====
First round
1	**(Hungary) Rita Kuti-Kis**	**6**	**6**
WC	(United States) Sarah Taylor	2	1
(Spain) Virginia Ruano Pascual	1	3
**(Canada) Jana Nejedly**	**6**	**6**

Qualifying competition
1	(Hungary) Rita Kuti-Kis	**7**	1	3
**(Canada) Jana Nejedly**	5	**6**	**6**

==== Second qualifier ====
First round
**(Chinese Taipei) Janet Lee**	**7^{10}**	**6**
(Netherlands) Miriam Oremans	6^{8}	4
WC	(United States) Jennifer Hopkins	3	3
5	**(United States) Meghann Shaughnessy**	**6**	**6**

Qualifying competition
**(Chinese Taipei) Janet Lee**	**6**	**7^{8}**
5	(United States) Meghann Shaughnessy	3	6^{6}

==== Third qualifier ====
First round
4	**(Canada) Sonya Jeyaseelan**	**6**	**6**
(Switzerland) Miroslava Vavrinek	4	3
(Germany) Andrea Glass	6^{3}	2
**(Belgium) Laurence Courtois**	**7^{7}**	**6**

Qualifying competition
4	**(Canada) Sonya Jeyaseelan**	**6**	**6**
(Belgium) Laurence Courtois	0	2

==== Fourth qualifier ====
First round
WC	(United States) Brandis Braverman	0	**7^{10}**	2
**(Mexico) Angélica Gavaldón**	**6**	6^{8}	**6**
**(United States) Brie Rippner**	4	**6**	**6**
7	(South Africa) Mariaan de Swardt	**6**	4	2

Qualifying competition
(Mexico) Angélica Gavaldón	2	0
**(United States) Brie Rippner**	**6**	**6**

==== Fifth qualifier ====
First round
6	**(Germany) Marlene Weingärtner**	**6**	**6**
(Australia) Alicia Molik	1	1
(Croatia) Jelena Kostanić	**7**	1	4
**(Romania) Cătălina Cristea**	5	**6**	**6**

Qualifying competition
6	**(Germany) Marlene Weingärtner**	**6**	**6**
(Romania) Cătălina Cristea	4	0

==== Sixth qualifier ====
First round
**(Netherlands) Seda Noorlander**	**6**	**6**
(Venezuela) María Alejandra Vento	2	3
(Indonesia) Yayuk Basuki	**6**	3	2
3	**(Slovenia) Tina Pisnik**	4	**6**	**6**

Qualifying competition
(Netherlands) Seda Noorlander	6^{5}	6^{7}
3	**(Slovenia) Tina Pisnik**	**7^{7}**	**7^{9}**

==== Seventh qualifier ====
First round
8	(Belgium) Els Callens	**6**	2	6^{2}
**(United States) Marissa Irvin**	2	**6**	**7^{7}**
**(Federal Republic of Yugoslavia) Sandra Načuk**	3	**6**	**6**
(Argentina) Florencia Labat	**6**	3	0

Qualifying competition
**(United States) Marissa Irvin**	**7**	5	**6**
(Federal Republic of Yugoslavia) Sandra Načuk	5	**7**	0

==== Eighth qualifier ====
First round
WC	(United States) Katrina Nimmers	0	3
**(France) Émilie Loit**	**6**	**6**
**(Russia) Alina Jidkova**	**6**	**6**
2	(Netherlands) Kristie Boogert	1	0

Qualifying competition
(France) Émilie Loit	**6**	4	3
**(Russia) Alina Jidkova**	4	**6**	**6**
