= Kristina Kraszewski =

American tennis player

- Country (sports): United States
- Born: August 11, 1979 (age 46) Seattle, Washington, U.S.
- Plays: Right-handed
- Prize money: $28,157

Singles
- Career record: No. 229 (Feb 19, 2001)
- Career titles: 3 ITF

Grand Slam singles results
- US Open: Q1 (2000, 2001)

Doubles
- Career record: 2 ITF
- Highest ranking: No. 416 (Aug 7, 2000)

Kristina Kraszewski (born August 11, 1979) is an American former professional tennis player.

Raised in California, Kraszewski has a father who is Polish and a mother from Nebraska. After graduating from West Torrance High School she returned to her birth state of Washington to attend college and became a three-time All-American for the Washington Huskies. She twice featured in US Open qualifying and won three ITF titles, including a $25,000 tournament in Winnipeg. Her career best ranking was 229 in the world, attained in 2001.

== ITF finals ==
Legend
$25,000 tournaments
$10,000 tournaments

=== Singles: 3 (3–0) ===
Outcome	No.	Date	Tournament	Surface	Opponent	Score
Winner	1.	Jul 1999	ITF Edmond, United States	Hard	Stephanie Mabry	6–3, 6–1
Winner	2.	Jul 1999	ITF Evansville, United States	Hard	Lara van Rooyen	6–3, 6–4
Winner	3.	Jul 2000	ITF Winnipeg, Canada	Hard	Vanessa Webb	3–6, 6–3, 6–7

=== Doubles: 4 (2–2) ===
Outcome	No.	Date	Tournament	Surface	Partner	Opponents	Score
Runner-up	1.	Jun 2000	ITF Montreal, Canada	Hard	Jennifer Embry	Amy Jensen; Amanda Augustus	6–3, 5–7, 0–6
Winner	1.	Jul 2000	ITF Lachine, Canada	Clay	Jennifer Embry	Amy Jensen; Amanda Augustus	6–1, 7–5
Winner	2.	Jun 2002	ITF Louisville, United States	Hard	Beau Jones	Ashley Kroh; Riza Zalameda	6–3, 1–6, 6–0
Runner-up	1.	Jun 2002	ITF Lachine, Canada	Hard	Adria Engel	Seiko Okamoto; Shizu Katsumi	w/o
