= 2001 Bank of the West Classic – Singles =

Singles
- 2001 Bank of the West Classic

Final
- Champion: (Belgium) Kim Clijsters
- Runner-up: (United States) Lindsay Davenport
- Score: 6–4, 6–7^{(5–7)}, 6–1

Details
- Draw: 28 (4 Q / 2 WC)
- Seeds: 8

Events
Singles	Doubles
- Stanford Classic

Venus Williams was the defending champion, but lost in quarterfinals to Meghann Shaughnessy.

Kim Clijsters won the title by defeating Lindsay Davenport 6–4, 6–7^{(5–7)}, 6–1 in the final.

== Seeds ==
The first four seeds received a bye into the second round.

1. (United States) Venus Williams (quarterfinals)
2. (United States) Lindsay Davenport (final)
3. (Belgium) Kim Clijsters (champion)
4. (United States) Monica Seles (semifinals)
5. (United States) Meghann Shaughnessy (semifinals)
6. (United States) Amy Frazier (second round)
7. (United States) Chanda Rubin (quarterfinals)
8. (Luxembourg) Anne Kremer (first round)

== Draw ==
Key

- Q = Qualifier
- WC = Wild card
- LL = Lucky loser
- Alt = Alternate
- ITF = ITF entry
- PR = Protected ranking
- SR = Special ranking
- SE = Special exempt
- JE = Junior exempt
- JR = Junior Accelerator Programme entrant
- CO = College Accelerator Programme entrant
- NG = Next Gen Accelerator Program entrant
- w/o = Walkover
- r = Retired
- d = Defaulted

=== Finals ===
Semifinals
5	(United States) Meghann Shaughnessy	3	6	1
3	(Belgium) Kim Clijsters	6	2	6
4	(United States) Monica Seles	4	2
2	(United States) Lindsay Davenport	6	6

Final
3	(Belgium) Kim Clijsters	6	6^{5}	6
2	(United States) Lindsay Davenport	4	7^{7}	1

=== Top half ===
First round
Q	(Canada) M-È Pelletier	4	3
(United States) K Brandi	6	6
(Russia) T Panova	6	6^{3}	5
(Australia) N Pratt	3	7^{7}	7
(Czech Republic) D Bedáňová	5	6^{4}
5	(United States) M Shaughnessy	7	7^{7}
(Zimbabwe) C Black	6	6
WC	(United States) K Nimmers	0	2
Q	(South Korea) Y-j Cho	7^{7}	3	2
(Russia) E Bovina	6^{3}	6	6
(Germany) M Weingärtner	2	4
7	(United States) C Rubin	6	6

Second round
1	(United States) V Williams	6	6
(United States) K Brandi	4	3
(Australia) N Pratt	2	2
5	(United States) M Shaughnessy	6	6
3	(Belgium) K Clijsters	6	3	7
(Zimbabwe) C Black	2	6	5
(Russia) E Bovina	4	0
7	(United States) C Rubin	6	6

Quarterfinals
1	(United States) V Williams	6	5	6^{4}
5	(United States) M Shaughnessy	2	7	7^{7}
3	(Belgium) K Clijsters	6	6
7	(United States) C Rubin	3	1

Semifinals
5	(United States) M Shaughnessy	3	6	1
3	(Belgium) K Clijsters	6	2	6

=== Bottom half ===
First round
8	(Luxembourg) A Kremer	4	7	6^{6}
(United States) S Cacic	6	5	7^{8}
(United States) J Hopkins	6^{4}	0
(United States) L Osterloh	7^{7}	6
(United States) M Tu	4	6	6
WC	(United States) L Granville	6	2	1
6	(United States) A Frazier	2	6	6
(United States) M Irvin	6	3	3
(Germany) J Kandarr	6	6
Q	(Australia) B Stewart	3	2
(Italy) R Grande	6	7^{8}
Q	(Canada) J Nejedly	4	6^{6}

Second round
(United States) S Cacic	2	3
(United States) L Osterloh	6	6
(United States) M Tu	6^{2}	2
4	(United States) M Seles	7^{7}	6
6	(United States) A Frazier	5	7^{7}	3
(Germany) J Kandarr	7	6^{3}	6
(Italy) R Grande	3	2
2	(United States) L Davenport	6	6

Quarterfinals
(United States) L Osterloh	2	5
4	(United States) M Seles	6	7
(Germany) J Kandarr	3	1
2	(United States) L Davenport	6	6

Semifinals
4	(United States) M Seles	4	2
2	(United States) L Davenport	6	6
