= 2000 Indian Wells Masters – Men's doubles =

Men's doubles
- 2000 Indian Wells Masters

Final
- Champions: (United States) Alex O'Brien (United States) Jared Palmer
- Runners-up: (Netherlands) Paul Haarhuis (Australia) Sandon Stolle
- Score: 6–4, 7–6^{(7–5)}

Details
- Draw: 32 (6WC/2Q)
- Seeds: 8

Events
Singles	men	women
Doubles	men	women
← 1999 ·	Indian Wells Masters	· 2001 →

Wayne Black and Sandon Stolle were the defending champions, but did not partner together this year. Black partnered Andrew Kratzmann, losing in the first round. Stolle partnered Paul Haarhuis, losing in the final.

Alex O'Brien and Jared Palmer won the title, defeating Haarhuis and Stolle 6–4, 7–6^{(7–5)} in the final.

== Seeds ==
1. (South Africa) Ellis Ferreira / (United States) Rick Leach (quarterfinals)
2. (United States) Alex O'Brien / (United States) Jared Palmer (champions)
3. (Australia) Todd Woodbridge / (Australia) Mark Woodforde (quarterfinals)
4. (Sweden) Jonas Björkman / (Zimbabwe) Byron Black (first round)
5. (Australia) Wayne Arthurs / (India) Leander Paes (second round)
6. (Zimbabwe) Wayne Black / (Australia) Andrew Kratzmann (second round)
7. (Netherlands) Paul Haarhuis / (Australia) Sandon Stolle (final)
8. (South Africa) David Adams / (South Africa) John-Laffnie de Jager (quarterfinals)

== Draw ==
=== Key ===
- Q = Qualifier
- WC = Wild card
- LL = Lucky loser
- Alt = Alternate
- ITF = ITF entry
- PR = Protected ranking
- SR = Special ranking
- SE = Special exempt
- JE = Junior exempt
- JR = Junior Accelerator Programme entrant
- CO = College Accelerator Programme entrant
- NG = Next Gen Accelerator Program entrant
- w/o = Walkover
- r = Retired
- d = Defaulted

=== Finals ===
Semifinals
7	(Netherlands) Paul Haarhuis (Australia) Sandon Stolle	3	6	6
Q	(Switzerland) Roger Federer (Slovakia) Dominik Hrbatý	6	3	2
(South Africa) Wayne Ferreira (Russia) Yevgeny Kafelnikov	4	4
2	(United States) Alex O'Brien (United States) Jared Palmer	6	6

Final
7	(Netherlands) Paul Haarhuis (Australia) Sandon Stolle	4	6^{5}
2	(United States) Alex O'Brien (United States) Jared Palmer	6	7^{7}

=== Top half ===
First round
1	(South Africa) E Ferreira (United States) R Leach	7^{7}	6^{3}	7
(United States) J Gimelstob (United States) R Reneberg	6^{5}	7^{7}	5
WC	(United States) B Bryan (United States) M Bryan	4	6^{3}
(Croatia) G Ivanišević (Czech Republic) D Vacek	6	7^{7}
(The Bahamas) M Knowles (Belarus) M Mirnyi	6	5	6^{1}
(United States) P Galbraith (United States) B MacPhie	4	7	7^{7}
(United States) J-M Gambill (United States) S Humphries	5	6^{4}
7	(Netherlands) P Haarhuis (Australia) S Stolle	7	7^{7}
3	(Australia) T Woodbridge (Australia) M Woodforde	6	6
WC	(United Kingdom) N Broad (South Africa) B Haygarth	2	3
(South Africa) M Barnard (Australia) D Macpherson	4	6	6^{6}
Q	(France) A Clément (France) S Grosjean	6	3	7^{8}
(Czech Republic) J Novák (Czech Republic) D Rikl	6	6^{2}	4
Q	(Switzerland) R Federer (Slovakia) D Hrbatý	4	7^{7}	6
(Brazil) J Oncins (Argentina) D Orsanic	1	3
5	(Australia) W Arthurs (India) L Paes	6	6

Second round
1	(South Africa) E Ferreira (United States) R Leach	6	3	6
(Croatia) G Ivanišević (Czech Republic) D Vacek	3	6	4
(United States) P Galbraith (United States) B MacPhie	6^{2}	6	5
7	(Netherlands) P Haarhuis (Australia) S Stolle	7^{7}	2	7
3	(Australia) T Woodbridge (Australia) M Woodforde	6	6
Q	(France) A Clément (France) S Grosjean	1	4
Q	(Switzerland) R Federer (Slovakia) D Hrbatý	7^{13}	6
5	(Australia) W Arthurs (India) L Paes	6^{11}	4

Quarterfinals
1	(South Africa) E Ferreira (United States) R Leach	7^{7}	4	5
7	(Netherlands) P Haarhuis (Australia) S Stolle	6^{3}	6	7
3	(Australia) T Woodbridge (Australia) M Woodforde	6	4	3
Q	(Switzerland) R Federer (Slovakia) D Hrbatý	3	6	6

Semifinals
7	(Netherlands) P Haarhuis (Australia) S Stolle	3	6	6
Q	(Switzerland) R Federer (Slovakia) D Hrbatý	6	3	2

=== Bottom half ===
First round
6	(Zimbabwe) W Black (Australia) A Kratzmann	6	3	7^{7}
(South Africa) P Norval (Zimbabwe) K Ullyett	3	6	6^{4}
WC	(United States) P Goldstein (United States) C Woodruff	6	5	6
(France) O Delaître (United States) J Tarango	3	7	4
WC	(Germany) N Kiefer (France) C Pioline	6^{4}	6^{5}
WC	(United States) J Courier (United States) J Stark	7^{7}	7^{7}
(South Africa) W Ferreira (Russia) Y Kafelnikov	6	6
4	(Sweden) J Björkman (Zimbabwe) B Black	2	2
8	(South Africa) D Adams (South Africa) J-L de Jager	6	6
(North Macedonia) A Kitinov (Belgium) T Vanhoudt	3	4
WC	(Sweden) T Enqvist (Sweden) T Johansson	6^{5}	6	6
(Australia) J Eagle (Australia) A Florent	7^{7}	4	2
(South Africa) C Haggard (France) F Santoro	7	5	5
(Czech Republic) M Damm (South Africa) R Koenig	5	7	7
(United States) D Johnson (Czech Republic) C Suk	4	4
2	(United States) A O'Brien (United States) J Palmer	6	6

Second round
6	(Zimbabwe) W Black (Australia) A Kratzmann	3	2
WC	(United States) P Goldstein (United States) C Woodruff	6	6
WC	(United States) J Courier (United States) J Stark	3	7^{7}	3
(South Africa) W Ferreira (Russia) Y Kafelnikov	6	6^{4}	6
8	(South Africa) D Adams (South Africa) J-L de Jager	6	6
WC	(Sweden) T Enqvist (Sweden) T Johansson	2	2
(Czech Republic) M Damm (South Africa) R Koenig	7	6^{4}	1
2	(United States) A O'Brien (United States) J Palmer	5	7^{7}	6

Quarterfinals
WC	(United States) P Goldstein (United States) C Woodruff	2	4
(South Africa) W Ferreira (Russia) Y Kafelnikov	6	6
8	(South Africa) D Adams (South Africa) J-L de Jager	3	0
2	(United States) A O'Brien (United States) J Palmer	6	6

Semifinals
(South Africa) W Ferreira (Russia) Y Kafelnikov	4	4
2	(United States) A O'Brien (United States) J Palmer	6	6

== Qualifying ==
=== Qualifying seeds ===
1. (South Africa) Marcos Ondruska / (United States) Jack Waite (first round)
2. (United States) Devin Bowen / (United States) Brandon Coupe (first round)
3. (Ecuador) Nicolás Lapentti / (Australia) Peter Tramacchi (qualifying competition)
4. (Spain) Alberto Martín / (Netherlands) Sjeng Schalken (qualifying competition)

=== Qualifiers ===
1. (France) Arnaud Clément / (France) Sébastien Grosjean
2. (Switzerland) Roger Federer / (Slovakia) Dominik Hrbatý

=== Qualifying draw ===
==== First qualifier ====
First round
1	(South Africa) Marcos Ondruska (United States) Jack Waite	5	5
WC	(France) Arnaud Clément (France) Sébastien Grosjean	7	7
WC	(United States) Luke Jensen (United States) Murphy Jensen	4	6^{8}
4	(Spain) Alberto Martín (Netherlands) Sjeng Schalken	6	7^{10}

Qualifying competition
WC	(France) Arnaud Clément (France) Sébastien Grosjean	7	4	6
4	(Spain) Alberto Martín (Netherlands) Sjeng Schalken	5	6	1

==== Second qualifier ====
First round
2	(United States) Devin Bowen (United States) Brandon Coupe	4	2
WC	(Switzerland) Roger Federer (Slovakia) Dominik Hrbatý	6	6
(United States) Geoff Grant (United States) Mark Keil	3	6	3
3	(Ecuador) Nicolás Lapentti (Australia) Peter Tramacchi	6	3	6

Qualifying competition
WC	(Switzerland) Roger Federer (Slovakia) Dominik Hrbatý	6^{3}	6	6
3	(Ecuador) Nicolás Lapentti (Australia) Peter Tramacchi	7^{7}	4	3
