= 2000 Indian Wells Masters – Women's doubles =

Women's doubles
- 2000 Indian Wells Masters

Final
- Champions: (United States) Lindsay Davenport (United States) Corina Morariu
- Runners-up: (Russia) Anna Kournikova (Belarus) Natasha Zvereva
- Score: 6–2, 6–3

Details
- Draw: 32 (2WC/1Q)
- Seeds: 8

Events
Singles	men	women
Doubles	men	women
- Indian Wells Masters

The women's doubles Tournament at the 2000 Indian Wells Masters took place between March 10 and March 19 on the outdoor hard courts of the Indian Wells Tennis Garden in Indian Wells, California, United States. Lindsay Davenport and Corina Morariu won the title, defeating Anna Kournikova and Natasha Zvereva in the final.

== Seeds ==
1. (United States) Lisa Raymond / (Australia) Rennae Stubbs (first round)
2. (Switzerland) Martina Hingis / (France) Mary Pierce (semifinals)
3. (United States) Lindsay Davenport / (United States) Corina Morariu (champions)
4. (Russia) Anna Kournikova / (Belarus) Natasha Zvereva (final)
5. (Russia) Elena Likhovtseva / (France) Nathalie Tauziat (quarterfinals)
6. (France) Julie Halard-Decugis / (Japan) Ai Sugiyama (second round)
7. (United States) Chanda Rubin / (France) Sandrine Testud (semifinals)
8. (Spain) Conchita Martínez / (Argentina) Patricia Tarabini (quarterfinals)

== Draw ==
Key

- Q = Qualifier
- WC = Wild card
- LL = Lucky loser
- Alt = Alternate
- ITF = ITF entry
- PR = Protected ranking
- SR = Special ranking
- SE = Special exempt
- JE = Junior exempt
- JR = Junior Accelerator Programme entrant
- CO = College Accelerator Programme entrant
- NG = Next Gen Accelerator Program entrant
- w/o = Walkover
- r = Retired
- d = Defaulted

=== Finals ===
Semifinals
7	(United States) Chanda Rubin (France) Sandrine Testud	6	3	3
4	(Russia) Anna Kournikova (Belarus) Natasha Zvereva	4	6	6
3	(United States) Lindsay Davenport (United States) Corina Morariu	3	7	6
2	(Switzerland) Martina Hingis (France) Mary Pierce	6	6^{5}	1

Final
4	(Russia) Anna Kournikova (Belarus) Natasha Zvereva	2	3
3	(United States) Lindsay Davenport (United States) Corina Morariu	6	6

=== Top half ===
First round
1	(United States) L Raymond (Australia) R Stubbs	2	7	3
WC	(United States) J Capriati (United States) M Seles	6	6^{1}	6
(Canada) S Jeyaseelan (Switzerland) P Schnyder	4	4
(Australia) C Barclay (France) AG Sidot	6	6
(Netherlands) K Boogert (Netherlands) M Oremans	6	6
(Austria) K Kschwendt (Argentina) F Labat	3	1
(South Africa) M de Swardt (United States) K Po	4	6	2
7	(United States) C Rubin (France) S Testud	6	3	6
4	(Russia) A Kournikova (Belarus) N Zvereva	6	6
(Belgium) E Callens (Belgium) D Van Roost	1	2
(Argentina) L Montalvo (United States) M Shaughnessy	6	3	4
(Spain) V Ruano Pascual (Argentina) P Suárez	1	6	6
(Italy) S Farina (Slovakia) K Habšudová	3	7	4
(United States) N Arendt (France) E Loit	6	6^{4}	6
(Croatia) J Kostanić (Slovenia) T Pisnik	5	0
6	(France) J Halard-Decugis (Japan) A Sugiyama	7	6

Second round
WC	(United States) J Capriati (United States) M Seles	6	6
(Australia) C Barclay (France) AG Sidot	2	4
(Netherlands) K Boogert (Netherlands) M Oremans	1	2
7	(United States) C Rubin (France) S Testud	6	6
4	(Russia) A Kournikova (Belarus) N Zvereva	7	6
(Spain) V Ruano Pascual (Argentina) P Suárez	5	3
(United States) N Arendt (France) E Loit	6	6
6	(France) J Halard-Decugis (Japan) A Sugiyama	4	3

Quarterfinals
WC	(United States) J Capriati (United States) M Seles	7	4	2
7	(United States) C Rubin (France) S Testud	5	6	6
4	(Russia) A Kournikova (Belarus) N Zvereva	4	6	6
(United States) N Arendt (France) E Loit	6	4	0

Semifinals
7	(United States) C Rubin (France) S Testud	6	3	3
4	(Russia) A Kournikova (Belarus) N Zvereva	3	6	6

=== Bottom half ===
First round
5	(Russia) E Likhovtseva (France) N Tauziat	6	6
(Slovenia) T Križan (Slovakia) K Srebotnik	1	3
Q	(France) N Dechy (Switzerland) E Gagliardi	4	7	2
(Indonesia) Y Basuki (Thailand) T Tanasugarn	6	6^{3}	6
(France) A Cocheteux (Belgium) L Courtois	5	7	2
(Belgium) S Appelmans (Italy) R Grande	7	6^{4}	6
WC	(Croatia) M Lučić (United States) A Stevenson	1	5
3	(United States) L Davenport (United States) C Morariu	6	7
8	(Spain) C Martínez (Argentina) P Tarabini	6	6
(Australia) J Dokic (Romania) I Spîrlea	2	4
(Zimbabwe) C Black (Kazakhstan) I Selyutina	4	6	4
(Romania) C Cristea (Romania) R Dragomir	6	3	6
(United States) A Frazier (United States) K Schlukebir	3	1
(Germany) A Huber (Austria) B Schett	6	6
(United States) D Graham (Japan) N Miyagi	3	6^{6}
2	(Switzerland) M Hingis (France) M Pierce	6	7

Second round
5	(Russia) E Likhovtseva (France) N Tauziat	7	4	7
(Indonesia) Y Basuki (Thailand) T Tanasugarn	6^{6}	6	6^{4}
(Belgium) S Appelmans (Italy) R Grande	2	2
3	(United States) L Davenport (United States) C Morariu	6	6
8	(Spain) C Martínez (Argentina) P Tarabini	6	5	6
(Romania) C Cristea (Romania) R Dragomir	4	7	3
(Germany) A Huber (Austria) B Schett	1	0
2	(Switzerland) M Hingis (France) M Pierce	6	6

Quarterfinals
5	(Russia) E Likhovtseva (France) N Tauziat	2	6	4
3	(United States) L Davenport (United States) C Morariu	6	4	6
8	(Spain) C Martínez (Argentina) P Tarabini	3	2
2	(Switzerland) M Hingis (France) M Pierce	6	6

Semifinals
3	(United States) L Davenport (United States) C Morariu	3	7	6
2	(Switzerland) M Hingis (France) M Pierce	6	6^{5}	1

== Qualifying ==
=== Qualifying seeds ===
1. (n/a)
2. (United States) Erika deLone / (Australia) Nicole Pratt (first round)

=== Qualifiers ===
1. (France) Nathalie Dechy / (Switzerland) Emmanuelle Gagliardi

=== Qualifying draw ===
First round
(Slovakia) Henrieta Nagyová (Spain) Magüi Serna	4
(Belgium) Kim Clijsters (Australia) Alicia Molik	8
(Netherlands) Seda Noorlander (Spain) Alicia Ortuño	8
(Spain) María Sánchez Lorenzo (Spain) Cristina Torrens Valero	3
WC	(Russia) Alina Jidkova (Germany) Marlene Weingärtner	9
(South Africa) Nannie de Villiers (South Africa) Jessica Steck	7
(France) Nathalie Dechy (Switzerland) Emmanuelle Gagliardi	8
2	(United States) Erika deLone (Australia) Nicole Pratt	4

Second round
(Belgium) Kim Clijsters (Australia) Alicia Molik	2
(Netherlands) Seda Noorlander (Spain) Alicia Ortuño	8
WC	(Russia) Alina Jidkova (Germany) Marlene Weingärtner	2
(France) Nathalie Dechy (Switzerland) Emmanuelle Gagliardi	8

Qualifying competition
(Netherlands) Seda Noorlander (Spain) Alicia Ortuño	2	2
(France) Nathalie Dechy (Switzerland) Emmanuelle Gagliardi	6	6
