= 2000 Indian Wells Masters – Men's singles =

Men's singles
- 2000 Indian Wells Masters

Final
- Champion: (Spain) Álex Corretja
- Runner-up: (Sweden) Thomas Enqvist
- Score: 6–4, 6–4, 6–3

Details
- Draw: 64 (4WC/8Q)
- Seeds: 16

Events
Singles	men	women
Doubles	men	women
← 1999 ·	Indian Wells Masters	· 2001 →

Álex Corretja defeated Thomas Enqvist in the final, 6–4, 6–4, 6–3 to win the men's singles tennis title at the 2000 Indian Wells Masters.

Mark Philippoussis was the defending champion, but lost in the semifinals to Enqvist.

== Seeds ==
1. (United States) Andre Agassi (first round)
2. (United States) Pete Sampras (quarterfinals)
3. (Russia) Yevgeny Kafelnikov (second round)
4. (Germany) Nicolas Kiefer (first round)
5. (Brazil) Gustavo Kuerten (second round)
6. (Sweden) Magnus Norman (quarterfinals)
7. (Chile) Marcelo Ríos (second round)
8. (Ecuador) Nicolás Lapentti (semifinals)
9. (France) Cédric Pioline (first round)
10. (Sweden) Thomas Enqvist (final)
11. (United Kingdom) Tim Henman (second round)
12. (Australia) Mark Philippoussis (semifinals)
13. (Australia) Patrick Rafter (second round)
14. (Spain) Álbert Costa (third round)
15. (United Kingdom) Greg Rusedski (second round)
16. (Australia) Lleyton Hewitt (second round)

== Draw ==
=== Key ===
- Q = Qualifier
- WC = Wild card
- LL = Lucky loser
- Alt = Alternate
- SE = Special exempt
- PR = Protected ranking
- ITF = ITF entry
- JE = Junior exempt
- w/o = Walkover
- r = Retired
- d = Defaulted
- SR = Special ranking

=== Finals ===
Quarterfinals
(Morocco) Hicham Arazi	2	0
8	(Ecuador) Nicolás Lapentti	6	6
(Spain) Àlex Corretja	4	6	6
6	(Sweden) Magnus Norman	6	2	2
12	(Australia) Mark Philippoussis	7^{9}	6
(Netherlands) Sjeng Schalken	6^{7}	4
10	(Sweden) Thomas Enqvist	6	3	6
2	(United States) Pete Sampras	3	6	3

Semifinals
8	(Ecuador) Nicolás Lapentti	3	4
(Spain) Álex Corretja	6	6
12	(Australia) Mark Philippoussis	3	7^{8}	6^{8}
10	(Sweden) Thomas Enqvist	6	6^{6}	7^{10}

Final
(Spain) Álex Corretja	6	6	6
10	(Sweden) Thomas Enqvist	4	4	3

=== Top half ===
==== Section 1 ====
First round
1	(United States) A Agassi	3	6	3
(Morocco) H Arazi	6	3	6
(Spain) F Mantilla	4	1
(Czech Republic) S Doseděl	6	6
WC	(United States) T Dent	2	6	2
Q	(Belarus) M Mirnyi	6	3	6
WC	(United States) J Blake	2	0
15	(United Kingdom) G Rusedski	6	6
9	(France) C Pioline	5	6^{4}
(France) N Escudé	7	7^{7}
(Brazil) F Meligeni	2	6	2
(Russia) M Safin	6	3	6
(France) A di Pasquale	7	4	7^{7}
(United States) J Courier	5	6	6^{5}
WC	(Sweden) J Björkman	3	3
8	(Ecuador) N Lapentti	6	6

Second round
(Morocco) H Arazi	6	6
(Czech Republic) S Doseděl	4	2
Q	(Belarus) M Mirnyi	6	6
15	(United Kingdom) G Rusedski	4	4
(France) N Escudé	6	6
(Russia) M Safin	2	0
(France) A di Pasquale	6	3	2
8	(Ecuador) N Lapentti	3	6	6

Third round
(Morocco) H Arazi	7	3	6
Q	(Belarus) M Mirnyi	5	6	4
(France) N Escudé	6	4	6^{3}
8	(Ecuador) N Lapentti	3	6	7^{7}

Quarterfinals
(Morocco) H Arazi	2	0
8	(Ecuador) N Lapentti	6	6

==== Section 2 ====
First round
4	(Germany) N Kiefer	1	4
(France) F Santoro	6	6
(Slovakia) D Hrbatý	7	6
(Morocco) Y El Aynaoui	5	2
(Spain) Á Corretja	6	6
(Slovakia) K Kučera	2	2
Q	(South Africa) M Ondruska	3	6^{7}
13	(Australia) P Rafter	6	7^{9}
11	(United Kingdom) T Henman	7	6
(Morocco) K Alami	5	2
(France) S Grosjean	6	6
(Czech Republic) J Novák	2	2
(United States) M Chang	7	6
(Spain) J C Ferrero	5	4
(Argentina) F Squillari	3	4
6	(Sweden) M Norman	6	6

Second round
(France) F Santoro	6^{2}	7^{7}	6
(Slovakia) D Hrbatý	7^{7}	6^{3}	4
(Spain) Á Corretja	7^{7}	5	6
13	(Australia) P Rafter	6^{3}	7	2
11	(United Kingdom) T Henman	3	6	5
(France) S Grosjean	6	3	7
(United States) M Chang	4	4
6	(Sweden) M Norman	6	6

Third round
(France) F Santoro	6^{6}	1
(Spain) Á Corretja	7^{8}	6
(France) S Grosjean	3	7^{7}	4
6	(Sweden) M Norman	6	6^{2}	6

Quarterfinals
(Spain) Á Corretja	4	6	6
6	(Sweden) M Norman	6	2	2

=== Bottom half ===
==== Section 3 ====
First round
5	(Brazil) G Kuerten	7	3	6
Q	(United States) J Gimelstob	5	6	3
Q	(France) C Saulnier	1	7^{7}	5
(Germany) T Haas	6	6^{4}	7
(Australia) A Ilie	7^{7}	3	1
(Spain) F Clavet	6^{5}	6	6
(United States) C Woodruff	3	4
12	(Australia) M Philippoussis	6	6
14	(Spain) Á Costa	3	7	6
(Austria) S Koubek	6	5	3
Q	(United States) P Goldstein	4	6	3
WC	(Croatia) G Ivanišević	6	2	6
Q	(Slovakia) J Krošlák	4	3
(Netherlands) S Schalken	6	6
(United States) V Spadea	1	1
3	(Russia) Y Kafelnikov	6	6

Second round
5	(Brazil) G Kuerten	6^{4}	6^{1}
(Germany) T Haas	7^{7}	7^{7}
(Spain) F Clavet	5	3
12	(Australia) M Philippoussis	7	6
14	(Spain) Á Costa	6	6^{2}	6
WC	(Croatia) G Ivanišević	2	7^{7}	3
(Netherlands) S Schalken	7	6
3	(Russia) Y Kafelnikov	5	3

Third round
(Germany) T Haas	2	3
12	(Australia) M Philippoussis	6	6
14	(Spain) Á Costa	2	3
(Netherlands) S Schalken	6	6

Quarterfinals
12	(Australia) M Philippoussis	7^{9}	6
(Netherlands) S Schalken	6^{7}	4

==== Section 4 ====
First round
7	(Chile) M Ríos	7^{7}	6
(Czech Republic) D Vacek	6^{5}	1
(Argentina) M Zabaleta	7	7^{7}
(Spain) F Vicente	5	6^{2}
(France) A Clément	1	3
(Sweden) T Johansson	6	6
(France) J Golmard	1	4
10	(Sweden) T Enqvist	6	6
16	(Australia) L Hewitt	6	3	6
(Spain) C Moyà	4	6	3
(Spain) A Martín	3	2
Q	(Zimbabwe) B Black	6	6
(South Africa) W Ferreira	6	6^{12}	6
Q	(United States) J-M Gambill	4	7^{14}	4
(Ukraine) A Medvedev	4	3
2	(United States) P Sampras	6	6

Second round
7	(Chile) M Ríos	6^{4}	3
(Argentina) M Zabaleta	7^{7}	6
(Sweden) T Johansson	1	4
10	(Sweden) T Enqvist	6	6
16	(Australia) L Hewitt	3	6^{5}
Q	(Zimbabwe) B Black	6	7^{7}
(South Africa) W Ferreira	6	6^{4}	6^{5}
2	(United States) P Sampras	3	7^{7}	7^{7}

Third round
(Argentina) M Zabaleta	4	5
10	(Sweden) T Enqvist	6	7
Q	(Zimbabwe) B Black	6	3	2
2	(United States) P Sampras	4	6	6

Quarterfinals
10	(Sweden) T Enqvist	6	3	6
2	(United States) P Sampras	3	6	3

== Qualifying ==
=== Qualifying seeds ===
1. (Switzerland) Roger Federer (first round)
2. (n/a)
3. (Australia) Richard Fromberg (first round)
4. (Netherlands) John van Lottum (qualifying competition)
5. (Belarus) Max Mirnyi (qualified)
6. (Switzerland) George Bastl (first round)
7. (United States) Paul Goldstein (qualified)
8. (Austria) Markus Hipfl (first round)
9. (Czech Republic) Martin Damm (qualifying competition)
10. (United States) Jan-Michael Gambill (qualified)
11. (Belgium) Christophe Rochus (qualifying competition)
12. (Haiti) Ronald Agénor (qualifying competition)
13. (Italy) Andrea Gaudenzi (first round)
14. (Zimbabwe) Byron Black (qualified)
15. (Chile) Nicolás Massú (first round)
16. (Thailand) Paradorn Srichaphan (first round)

=== Qualifiers ===
1. (South Africa) Marcos Ondruska
2. (France) Cyril Saulnier
3. (United States) Justin Gimelstob
4. (Zimbabwe) Byron Black
5. (Belarus) Max Mirnyi
6. (Slovakia) Ján Krošlák
7. (United States) Paul Goldstein
8. (United States) Jan-Michael Gambill

=== Qualifying draw ===
==== First qualifier ====
First round
1	(Switzerland) Roger Federer	7	1	4
(India) Leander Paes	5	6	6
(South Africa) Marcos Ondruska	2	7	6
16	(Thailand) Paradorn Srichaphan	6	5	4

Qualifying competition
(India) Leander Paes	6	4	4
(South Africa) Marcos Ondruska	4	6	6

==== Second qualifier ====
First round
(France) Cyril Saulnier	6	4	6
WC	(Germany) Maximilian Abel	2	6	3
(Australia) Mark Woodforde	6	6
15	(Chile) Nicolás Massú	3	0

Qualifying competition
(France) Cyril Saulnier	6	6
(Australia) Mark Woodforde	4	3

==== Third qualifier ====
First round
3	(Australia) Richard Fromberg	7^{7}	6^{8}	3
(United States) Justin Gimelstob	6^{2}	7^{10}	6
WC	(United States) Phillip King	4	6	4
4	(Netherlands) John van Lottum	6	3	6

Qualifying competition
(United States) Justin Gimelstob	6	6
4	(Netherlands) John van Lottum	4	3

==== Fourth qualifier ====
First round
14	(Zimbabwe) Byron Black	5	6	7
(Sweden) Fredrik Jonsson	7	3	5
(Australia) Wayne Arthurs	7^{7}	6
13	(Italy) Andrea Gaudenzi	6^{2}	2

Qualifying competition
14	(Zimbabwe) Byron Black	7^{7}	6
(Australia) Wayne Arthurs	6^{5}	4

==== Fifth qualifier ====
First round
5	(Belarus) Max Mirnyi	6	6
(Switzerland) Michel Kratochvil	3	4
(France) Stéphane Huet	2	1
12	(Haiti) Ronald Agénor	6	6

Qualifying competition
5	(Belarus) Max Mirnyi	7^{7}	6
12	(Haiti) Ronald Agénor	6^{5}	4

==== Sixth qualifier ====
First round
6	(Switzerland) George Bastl	4	6^{3}
(Slovakia) Ján Krošlák	6	7^{7}
(Belgium) Xavier Malisse	6^{11}	3
11	(Belgium) Christophe Rochus	7^{13}	6

Qualifying competition
(Slovakia) Ján Krošlák	6	3	6
11	(Belgium) Christophe Rochus	2	6	3

==== Seventh qualifier ====
First round
7	(United States) Paul Goldstein	6	6
(Philippines) Cecil Mamiit	1	2
(Zimbabwe) Wayne Black	6	4	2
9	(Czech Republic) Martin Damm	4	6	6

Qualifying competition
7	(United States) Paul Goldstein	5	6	6
9	(Czech Republic) Martin Damm	7	3	4

==== Eighth qualifier ====
First round
8	(Austria) Markus Hipfl	6	3	3
WC	(United States) Bob Bryan	4	6	6
WC	(United States) Alex O'Brien	4	1
10	(United States) Jan-Michael Gambill	6	6

Qualifying competition
WC	(United States) Bob Bryan	7^{7}	6^{6}	3
10	(United States) Jan-Michael Gambill	6^{3}	7^{8}	6
