= 2000 Indian Wells Open =

2000 Indian Wells Masters
- Date: March 10–18 (women); March 13–19 (men)
- Edition: 27th
- Category: Tennis Masters Series (ATP); Tier I Series (WTA)
- Prize money: $2,450,000
- Surface: Hard / outdoor
- Location: Indian Wells, California, US
- Venue: Indian Wells Tennis Garden

Champions

Men's singles
- (Spain) Àlex Corretja

Women's singles
- (United States) Lindsay Davenport

Men's doubles
- (United States) Alex O'Brien / (United States) Jared Palmer

Women's doubles
- (United States) Lindsay Davenport / (United States) Corina Morariu
- Indian Wells Masters

The 2000 Indian Wells Open (also known as Tennis Masters Series Indian Wells) was a tennis tournament played on outdoor hard courts. It was the 27th edition of the Indian Wells Masters, and was part of the ATP Masters Series of the 2000 ATP Tour, and of the Tier I Series of the 2000 WTA Tour. Both the men's and the women's events took place at the newly built Indian Wells Tennis Garden in Indian Wells, California, United States. The women's tournament was played from March 10 through March 18 and the men's from March 13 through March 19.

The men singles draw was headlined by ATP No. 1, Australian Open titlist, Masters Cup finalist, 1995 runner-up Andre Agassi, Masters Cup winner, 1995 Wimbledon champion Pete Sampras and Australian Open runner-up Yevgeny Kafelnikov. Also competing in the field were Dubai winner Nicolas Kiefer, Santiago titlist Gustavo Kuerten, Magnus Norman, Marcelo Ríos and Nicolás Lapentti.

== Finals ==
=== Men's singles ===
(Spain) Àlex Corretja defeated (Sweden) Thomas Enqvist, 6–4, 6–4, 6–3

- It was Àlex Corretja's 1st title of the year, and his 10th overall. It was his 1st Masters title of the year, and his 2nd overall.

=== Women's singles ===
(United States) Lindsay Davenport defeated (Switzerland) Martina Hingis 4–6, 6–4, 6–0

- It was Lindsay Davenport's 2nd title of the year and her 28th overall. It was her 1st Tier I title of the year and her 5th overall. It was also her 2nd title at the event after winning in 1997.

=== Men's doubles ===
(United States) Alex O'Brien / (United States) Jared Palmer defeated (Netherlands) Paul Haarhuis / (Australia) Sandon Stolle 6–4, 7–6^{(7–5)}

=== Women's doubles ===
(United States) Lindsay Davenport / (United States) Corina Morariu defeated (Russia) Anna Kournikova / (Belarus) Natasha Zvereva, 6–2, 6–3
