= 2001 Bank of the West Classic =

- Date: July 23–29
- Edition: 30th
- Category: Tier II Series
- Draw: 28S / 16D
- Prize money: $565,000
- Surface: Hard / outdoor
- Location: Stanford, California, U.S.
- Venue: Taube Tennis Center

Champions

Singles
- (Belgium) Kim Clijsters

Doubles
- (Chinese Taipei) Janet Lee / (Indonesia) Wynne Prakusya
← 2000 ·	Bank of the West Classic	· 2002 →

The 2001 Bank of the West Classic was a tennis tournament played on outdoor hard courts that was part of the Tier II Series of the 2001 WTA Tour. It was the 30th edition of the tournament and took place at the Taube Tennis Center in Stanford, California, United States, from July 23 through July 29, 2001. Third-seeded Kim Clijsters won the singles title and earned $90,000 first-prize money.

== Finals ==
=== Singles ===
(Belgium) Kim Clijsters defeated (United States) Lindsay Davenport, 6–4, 6–7^{(5–7)}, 6–1

- It was Clijsters's 1st singles title of the year, and the 4th of her career.

=== Doubles ===
(Chinese Taipei) Janet Lee / (Indonesia) Wynne Prakusya defeated (United States) Nicole Arendt / (Netherlands) Caroline Vis, 3–6, 6–3, 6–3
