= 2000 Bank of the West Classic =

- Date: July 24–30
- Edition: 29th
- Category: Tier II Series
- Draw: 28S / 16D
- Prize money: $535,000
- Surface: Hard / outdoor
- Location: Stanford, California, U.S.
- Venue: Taube Tennis Center

Champions

Singles
- (United States) Venus Williams

Doubles
- (United States) Chanda Rubin / (France) Sandrine Testud
- Bank of the West Classic

The 2000 Bank of the West Classic was a tennis tournament played on outdoor hard courts that was part of the Tier II Series of the 2000 WTA Tour. It was the 29th edition of the tournament and took place at the Taube Tennis Center in Stanford, California, United States, from July 24 through July 30, 2000. Second-seeded Venus Williams won the singles title and earned $87,000 first-prize money.

== Finals ==
=== Singles ===
(United States) Venus Williams defeated (United States) Lindsay Davenport, 6–1, 6–4

- It was Williams' 2nd singles title of the year, and the 11th of her career.

=== Doubles ===
(United States) Chanda Rubin / (France) Sandrine Testud defeated (Zimbabwe) Cara Black / (United States) Amy Frazier, 6–4, 6–4
