= Katrina Nimmers =

American tennis player

- Country (sports): United States
- Born: May 30, 1980 (age 46)
- Prize money: $19,850

Singles
- Highest ranking: No. 377 (Apr 16, 2001)

Doubles
- Career titles: 1 ITF
- Highest ranking: No. 357 (May 21, 2001)

Katrina Nimmers (born May 30, 1980) is an American former professional tennis player.

Nimmers, an African American, grew up in South Los Angeles. She reached a best singles world ranking of 377 on the professional tour and won one doubles title on the ITF Women's Circuit. Her only WTA Tour singles main draw appearance came at the 2001 Bank of the West Classic in Stanford, where she lost in the first round to Cara Black.

== ITF finals ==
=== Doubles: 1 (1–0) ===
| Outcome | No. | Date | Tournament | Surface | Partner | Opponents | Score |
|---|---|---|---|---|---|---|---|
| Winner | 1. | June 2000 | ITF Easton, United States | Hard | (Federal Republic of Yugoslavia) Višnja Vuletić | (United States) Whitney Laiho (United States) Janet Walker | 6–4, 6–4 |
