= Lauren Kalvaria =

American tennis player

- Full name: Lauren Kalvaria Van Allen
- Country (sports): United States
- Born: August 29, 1980 (age 44)
- Plays: Right-handed
- Prize money: $24,671

Singles
- Career record: 60–35
- Highest ranking: No. 323 (August 4, 2003)

Doubles
- Career record: 36–25
- Career titles: 3 ITF
- Highest ranking: No. 285 (December 8, 2003)

Grand Slam doubles results
- US Open: 1R (2002)

Lauren Kalvaria (born August 29, 1980) is an American former professional tennis player.

A right-handed player from Florida, Kalvaria competed professionally after graduating from Stanford University in 2002.

While at Stanford she and Gabriela Lastra became the top ranked doubles pairing in college tennis, which culminated in them the winning 2002 NCAA doubles championship.

Kalvaria featured mostly in satellite tournaments on the professional tour and reached a career high singles ranking of 323 in the world. As a doubles player she won three ITF titles and appeared, with Lastra, in the main draw of the 2002 US Open.

== ITF finals ==
Legend
$25,000 tournaments
$10,000 tournaments

=== Singles: 2 (0–2) ===
Result	No.	Date	Tournament	Surface	Opponent	Score
Loss	1.	July 1, 2001	Edmond, United States	Hard	(United States) Sara Walker	6–7^{(4)}, 2–6
Loss	2.	June 9, 2002	Hilton Head, United States	Hard	(United States) Gabriela Lastra	6–0, 4–6, 2–6

=== Doubles: 6 (3–3) ===
Result	No.	Date	Tournament	Surface	Partner	Opponents	Score
Loss	1.	July 11, 1999	Edmond, United States	Hard	(United States) Gabriela Lastra	(South Africa) Kim Grant (United States) Stephanie Mabry	4–6, 1–6
Win	1.	August 1, 1999	Baltimore, United States	Hard	(Canada) Marie-Ève Pelletier	(United States) Candice De La Torre (Australia) Nadia Johnston	7–6, 6–3
Loss	2.	August 6, 2000	Harrisonburg, United States	Clay	(United States) Gabriela Lastra	(Japan) Rika Fujiwara (Australia) Cindy Watson	4–6, 7–5, 5–7
Win	2.	June 30, 2002	Edmond, United States	Hard	(United States) Gabriela Lastra	(Japan) Satomi Kinjo (Japan) Yuka Yoshida	6–1, 6–4
Loss	3.	August 4, 2002	Vancouver, Canada	Hard	(United States) Gabriela Lastra	(United States) Amanda Augustus (Canada) Renata Kolbovic	5–7, 5–7
Win	3.	September 14, 2003	Peachtree, United States	Hard	(United States) Jessica Lehnhoff	(United States) Amanda Augustus (Canada) Melanie Marois	4–6, 6–3, 6–1
