= 2002 Bank of the West Classic =

- Date: July 22–28
- Edition: 31st
- Category: Tier II Series
- Draw: 28S / 16D
- Prize money: US$585,000
- Surface: Hard / outdoor
- Location: Stanford, California, U.S.
- Venue: Taube Tennis Center

Champions

Singles
- (United States) Venus Williams

Doubles
- (United States) Lisa Raymond / (Australia) Rennae Stubbs
← 2001 ·	Stanford Classic	· 2003 →

The 2002 Bank of the West Classic was a women's tennis tournament played on outdoor hard courts that was part of the Tier II Series of the 2002 WTA Tour. It was the 31st edition of the tournament and took place at the Taube Tennis Center in Stanford, California, United States, from July 22 through July 28, 2002. First-seeded Venus Williams won the singles title, her second at the event after 2000, and earned $ 93,000 first-prize money.

== Finals ==
=== Singles ===
(United States) Venus Williams defeated. (Belgium) Kim Clijsters, 6–3, 6–3

- It was Williams' 5th singles title of the year and the 15th of her career.

=== Doubles ===
(United States) Lisa Raymond / (Australia) Rennae Stubbs defeated (Slovakia) Janette Husárová / (Spain) Conchita Martínez, 6–1, 6–1
