= Amy Jensen =

Australian tennis player

- Country (sports): Australia
- Born: 31 July 1978 (age 47) Brisbane, Australia
- Prize money: $34,867

Singles
- Career record: 26–37
- Highest ranking: No. 423 (29 January 2001)

Doubles
- Career record: 72–46
- Highest ranking: No. 199 (17 November 1997)

Grand Slam doubles results
- Australian Open: 1R (2001)
- US Open: 1R (1998, 1999, 2000)

Amy Jensen (born 31 July 1978) is a former professional tennis player from Australia.

== Biography ==
Originally from Brisbane, Jensen had a successful career in American college tennis playing for UC Berkeley. From 1998 to 2000 she won three successive NCAA doubles titles, partnering Amanda Augustus in the first two, then Claire Curran for the third.

As a professional player she had a top 200 ranking in doubles and won eight ITF titles. She featured in the main draw of the women's doubles at both the Australian Open and US Open during her career. At the 2000 US Open, she and partner Claire Curran won the first set of their opening round match against Martina Hingis and Mary Pierce.

Jensen has held several coaches positions in college tennis. She is currently the head coach for UC Santa Cruz.

== ITF finals ==
Legend
$25,000 tournaments
$10,000 tournaments

=== Doubles (8–4) ===
Outcome	No.	Date	Location	Surface	Partner	Opponents	Score
Runner-up	1.	21 July 1996	Frinton, United Kingdom	Grass	(Hungary) Anita Kurimay	(United Kingdom) Lucie Ahl (United Kingdom) Shirli-Ann Siddall	1–6, 4–6
Winner	1.	28 July 1996	Dublin, Ireland	Grass	(Australia) Sarah Stanley	(Australia) Kylie Moulds (Australia) Cindy Watson	6–4, 6–4
Winner	2.	8 June 1997	Little Rock, United States	Hard	(United States) Samantha Reeves	(United States) Erica Adams (Norway) Tina Samara	6–0, 6–4
Winner	3.	23 June 1997	Greenwood, United States	Hard	(Australia) Melissa Beadman	(United States) Keirsten Alley (Norway) Tina Samara	4–6, 6–2, 6–4
Runner-up	2.	26 July 1997	Dublin, Ireland	Carpet	(United States) Amanda Augustus	(South Africa) Surina De Beer (United Kingdom) Lizzie Jelfs	3–6, 6–4, 4–6
Runner-up	3.	22 September 1997	Newport Beach, United States	Hard	(United States) Amanda Augustus	(United States) Ginger Helgeson-Nielsen (Chinese Taipei) Janet Lee	3–6, 3–6
Winner	4.	8 August 1999	Harrisonburg, United States	Hard	(United States) Amanda Augustus	(United States) Julie Ditty (Chinese Taipei) Wang I-ting	5–7, 6–3, 6–2
Winner	5.	25 June 2000	Montreal, Canada	Hard	(United States) Amanda Augustus	(United States) Jennifer Embry (United States) Kristina Kraszewski	3–6, 7–5, 6–0
Runner-up	4.	2 July 2000	Lachine, Canada	Clay	(United States) Amanda Augustus	(United States) Jennifer Embry (United States) Kristina Kraszewski	1–6, 5–7
Winner	6.	17 September 2000	Osaka, Japan	Hard	(United States) Amanda Augustus	(Japan) Shiho Hisamatsu (South Korea) Jeon Mi-ra	6–3, 6–2
Winner	7.	1 October 2000	Saga, Japan	Grass	(United States) Amanda Augustus	(South Africa) Nannie de Villiers (Czech Republic) Eva Krejčová	6–4, 6–3
Winner	8.	5 November 2000	Gold Coast, Australia	Hard	(United States) Amanda Augustus	(South Africa) Natalie Grandin (South Africa) Nicole Rencken	6–4, 6–3
