= Amanda Augustus =

American tennis player

- Country (sports): United States
- Born: January 19, 1978 (age 47); California, U.S.
- Turned pro: 1999
- Retired: 2005
- Plays: Left-handed
- Prize money: $113,106

Singles
- Career record: 68–103
- Career titles: 0
- Highest ranking: No. 304 (June 18, 2001)

Doubles
- Career record: 179–120
- Career titles: 0 WTA, 18 ITF
- Highest ranking: No. 82 (November 4, 2002)

Grand Slam doubles results
- Australian Open: 1R (2002, 2003)
- French Open: 2R (2002)
- Wimbledon: 1R (2001, 2002, 2003, 2004)
- US Open: 2R (2002)

Amanda Augustus (born January 19, 1978) is a former professional tennis player from the United States.

== Biography ==
Augustus, who grew up in Los Angeles County, attended UC Berkeley and was one of the most successful tennis players in California Golden Bears history. She received All-Pac-10 honors in each of her four seasons. In 1998 and 1999 she teamed up with Amy Jensen to claim back to back NCAA doubles titles.

A left-handed player, Augustus turned professional after graduating from UC Berkeley in 1999.

She played on tour primarily as a doubles player and reached a top ranking of 82 in the world, with 18 ITF doubles titles. Her best performance on the WTA Tour were semi-final appearances in the doubles at the 2001 Tashkent Open, 2002 Canberra Women's Classic and 2002 Bank of the West Classic in Stanford. She featured in the main draw of all four grand slam tournaments. Both of her wins in grand slam matches were over seeded pairings. Partnering Jennifer Embry at the 2002 French Open, the pair beat 12th seeds Janet Lee and Wynne Prakusya. At the 2002 US Open she and Embry had a win over Amanda Coetzer and Lori McNeil, who were also seeded 12th. She played her final year on the professional tour in 2005.

Formerly a head coach at the University of Michigan, since 2007 she has headed women's tennis back at her alma mater UC Berkeley.

== ITF Circuit finals ==
=== Doubles (18–16) ===
$75,000 tournaments
$50,000 tournaments
$25,000 tournaments
$10,000 tournaments

Result	No.	Date	Tournament	Surface	Partner	Opponents	Score
Win	1.	9 June 1996	Lawrenceville, United States	Hard	(Canada) Vanessa Webb	(United States) Rebecca Jensen (United States) Kristine Kurth	7–6, 3–6, 6–4
Win	2.	30 June 1996	Mahwah, United States	Hard	(Canada) Vanessa Webb	(United States) Jackie Moe (United States) Vickie Paynter	6–2, 6–4
Loss	1.	16 June 1997	Mount Pleasant, United States	Hard	(Norway) Tina Samara	(United States) Keirsten Alley (Indonesia) Liza Andriyani	6–2, 3–6, 4–6
Loss	2.	26 July 1997	Dublin, Ireland	Carpet	(Australia) Amy Jensen	(South Africa) Surina De Beer (United Kingdom) Lizzie Jelfs	3–6, 6–4, 4–6
Loss	3.	22 September 1997	Newport Beach, United States	Hard	(Australia) Amy Jensen	(United States) Ginger Helgeson-Nielsen (Chinese Taipei) Janet Lee	3–6, 3–6
Win	3.	28 June 1998	Springfield, United States	Hard	(United States) Julie Scott	(Australia) Amanda Grahame (Australia) Bryanne Stewart	6–0, 6–0
Win	4.	12 July 1998	Easton, United States	Hard	(United States) Julie Scott	(United States) Dawn Buth (United States) Stephanie Nickitas	6–2, 3–6, 6–1
Loss	4.	18 July 1999	Evansville, United States	Hard	(United States) Elizabeth Schmidt	(United States) Amanda Johnson (United States) Andrea Nathan	4–6, 6–3, 3–6
Win	5.	8 August 1999	Harrisonburg, United States	Hard	(Australia) Amy Jensen	(United States) Julie Ditty (Chinese Taipei) Wang I-ting	5–7, 6–3, 6–2
Loss	5.	21 November 1999	Bendigo, Australia	Hard	(United States) Julie Scott	(Australia) Rachel McQuillan (Australia) Trudi Musgrave	4–6, 5–7
Win	6.	16 April 2000	La Cañada, United States	Hard	(United States) Julie Scott	(Chinese Taipei) Janet Lee (Indonesia) Wynne Prakusya	6–3, 6–1
Win	7.	25 June 2000	Montreal, Canada	Hard	(Australia) Amy Jensen	(United States) Jennifer Embry (United States) Kristina Kraszewski	3–6, 7–5, 6–0
Loss	6.	2 July 2000	Lachine, Canada	Clay	(Australia) Amy Jensen	(United States) Jennifer Embry (United States) Kristina Kraszewski	1–6, 5–7
Win	8.	17 September 2000	Osaka, Japan	Hard	(Australia) Amy Jensen	(Japan) Shiho Hisamatsu (South Korea) Jeon Mi-ra	6–3, 6–2
Win	9.	1 October 2000	Saga, Japan	Grass	(Australia) Amy Jensen	(South Africa) Nannie de Villiers (Czech Republic) Eva Krejčová	6–4, 6–3
Win	10.	5 November 2000	Gold Coast, Australia	Hard	(Australia) Amy Jensen	(South Africa) Natalie Grandin (South Africa) Nicole Rencken	6–4, 6–3
Loss	7.	15 April 2001	Columbus, United States	Hard (i)	(United States) Sarah Taylor	(Australia) Lisa McShea (Kazakhstan) Irina Selyutina	1–6, 5–7
Loss	8.	22 April 2001	Allentown, United States	Hard (i)	(Czech Republic) Zuzana Lešenarová	(Australia) Lisa McShea (Kazakhstan) Irina Selyutina	5–7, 3–6
Winner	11.	29 April 2001	Jackson, United States	Clay	(Kazakhstan) Irina Selyutina	(Czech Republic) Zuzana Lešenarová (Austria) Nicole Melch	6–3, 6–3
Loss	9.	4 November 2001	Hayward, United States	Hard	(United States) Abigail Spears	(Kazakhstan) Irina Selyutina (South Africa) Nannie de Villiers	0–6, 5–7
Win	12.	18 November 2001	Mexico City	Hard	(United States) Jennifer Embry	(Republic of Ireland) Kelly Liggan (Czech Republic) Renata Voráčová	7–6^{(7–5)}, 2–6, 7–6^{7–5)}
Win	13.	3 December 2001	West Columbia, United States	Hard	(United States) Jennifer Embry	(Russia) Alina Jidkova (United States) Abigail Spears	0–6, 6–3, 6–3
Loss	10.	30 March 2002	Bendigo, Australia	Grass	(Republic of Ireland) Claire Curran	(Australia) Sarah Stone (Australia) Samantha Stosur	0–6, 6–4, 3–6
Win	14.	7 July 2002	Amsterdam, Netherlands	Clay	(Australia) Christina Horiatopoulos	(Czech Republic) Lenka Šnajdrová (Croatia) Ivana Višić	7–6^{(7–4)}, 6–4
Win	15.	14 July 2002	Felixstowe, Great Britain	Grass	(Australia) Nicole Sewell	(Australia) Christina Horiatopoulos (Australia) Sarah Stone	7–6^{(7–5)}, 6–4
Win	16.	4 August 2002	Vancouver Open, Canada	Hard	(Canada) Renata Kolbovic	(United States) Lauren Kalvaria (United States) Gabriela Lastra	7–5, 7–5
Loss	11.	17 November 2002	Port Pirie, Australia	Hard	(United States) Gabriela Lastra	(Australia) Trudi Musgrave (United Kingdom) Julie Pullin	6–7^{(1–7)}, 2–6
Loss	12.	24 November 2002	Nuriootpa, Australia	Hard	(United States) Gabriela Lastra	(Australia) Evie Dominikovic (Australia) Rachel McQuillan	5–7, 3–6
Loss	13.	8 December 2002	Nonthaburi, Thailand	Hard	(Netherlands) Debby Haak	(Croatia) Ivana Abramović (Japan) Remi Tezuka	2–6, 1–6
Win	17.	13 July 2003	Vancouver Open] Canada	Hard	(Canada) Mélanie Marois	(Australia) Nicole Sewell (Netherlands) Andrea van den Hurk	7–6^{(7–4)}, 6–4
Loss	14.	14 September 2003	Peachtree, United States	Hard	(Canada) Mélanie Marois	(United States) Lauren Kalvaria (United States) Jessica Lehnhoff	6–4, 3–6, 1–6
Loss	15.	28 September 2003	Albuquerque, United States	Hard	(Canada) Mélanie Marois	(United States) Samantha Reeves (Venezuela) Milagros Sequera	3–6, 2–6
Win	18.	19 October 2003	Mexico City	Hard	(Canada) Mélanie Marois	(United States) Sarah Riske (United States) Kaysie Smashey	7–6^{(8–6)}, 6–2
Loss	16.	1 February 2004	Waikoloa, United States	Hard	(South Africa) Natalie Grandin	(Argentina) Gisela Dulko (Argentina) Patricia Tarabini	6–1, 3–6, 3–6
