= Gabriela Lastra =

American tennis player

- Full name: Gabriela Lastra-Yetten
- Country (sports): United States
- Born: June 7, 1980 (age 44); Chile
- Plays: Right-handed (two handed backhand)
- Prize money: $56,892

Singles
- Career record: 69–50
- Highest ranking: No. 193 (September 15, 2003)

Grand Slam singles results
- US Open: 1R (2003)

Doubles
- Career record: 36–34
- Highest ranking: No. 164 (August 4, 2003)

Grand Slam doubles results
- US Open: 1R (2002)

Gabriela Lastra-Yetten (born June 7, 1980) is a former professional tennis player from the United States.

== Biography ==
Lastra, who was born in Chile, played junior tennis in Northern California, before attending Stanford University.

While at Stanford she competed in the local WTA Tour tournament, the Stanford Classic, on multiple occasions in the women's doubles draw. She and Keiko Tokuda paired together to reach the quarter-finals in 2000. A member of three NCAA Division 1 Championship winning teams, she partnered with Lauren Kalvaria win the NCAA doubles title in 2002. The pair also competed at the 2002 US Open as wildcards and were beaten in the first round by 15th seeds Kim Clijsters and Meghann Shaughnessy.

In 2003 she was a doubles quarter-finalist at the Warsaw Open and qualified for the doubles main draw in Madrid. At the 2003 US Open, she won her way through qualifying, with wins over Kristen Schlukebir, Sandra Kleinova and Nuria Llagostera Vives. She lost to Amanda Coetzer in the first round, but by qualifying had entered the world's top 200.

Following her 2003 US Open appearance she retired from professional tennis and worked for several years for a private equity firm in New York. She has since moved to Andover, Massachusetts and is known by her married name Yetten. Locally she is involved in coaching tennis and has served on the coaching staff at Bentley University.
