= 1997 Bank of the West Classic – Doubles =

Doubles
- 1997 Bank of the West Classic

Final
- Champions: (United States) Lindsay Davenport (Switzerland) Martina Hingis
- Runners-up: (Spain) Conchita Martínez (Argentina) Patricia Tarabini
- Score: 6–1, 6–3

Details
- Draw: 16
- Seeds: 4

Events
Singles	Doubles
← 1996 ·	Bank of the West Classic	· 1998 →

Lindsay Davenport and Mary Joe Fernández were the defending champions but only Davenport competed that year with Martina Hingis.

Davenport and Hingis won in the final 6–1, 6–3 against Conchita Martínez and Patricia Tarabini.

== Seeds ==
Champion seeds are indicated in bold text while text in italics indicates the round in which those seeds were eliminated.

1. (United States) **Lindsay Davenport** / (Switzerland) **Martina Hingis (champions)**
2. (United States) Lori McNeil / (Netherlands) Caroline Vis (first round)
3. (Spain) Conchita Martínez / (Argentina) Patricia Tarabini (final)
4. (Japan) Rika Hiraki / (Japan) Naoko Kijimuta (first round)

== Draw ==
=== Key ===
- Q = Qualifier
- WC = Wild card
- LL = Lucky loser
- Alt = Alternate
- ITF = ITF entry
- PR = Protected ranking
- SR = Special ranking
- SE = Special exempt
- JE = Junior exempt
- JR = Junior Accelerator Programme entrant
- CO = College Accelerator Programme entrant
- NG = Next Gen Accelerator Program entrant
- w/o = Walkover
- r = Retired
- d = Defaulted

First round
1	(United States) **L Davenport** (Switzerland) **M Hingis**	**6**	**6**
(United States) D Graham (Italy) R Grande	2	4
(United States) K Alley (United States) L Poruri	5	1
WC	(United States) **K Schlukebir** (United States) **J Scott**	**7**	**6**
4	(Japan) R Hiraki (Japan) N Kijimuta	1	3
(Russia) **E Likhovtseva** (Japan) **A Sugiyama**	**6**	**6**
(United States) A Frazier (United States) K Po	2	5
(United States) **A Grossman** (United States) **M Tu**	**6**	**7**
(United States) **E deLone** (Australia) **N Pratt**	**6**	**6**
(United States) A Bleszynski (Italy) F Lubiani	4	2
(Canada) J Nejedly (Canada) M Nejedly	1	4
3	(Spain) **C Martínez** (Argentina) **P Tarabini**	**6**	**6**
(Belarus) O Barabanschikova (United States) L Wild	2	4
(Canada) **P Hy-Boulais** (United States) **L Lee**	**6**	**6**
(South Africa) **A Coetzer** (France) **M Pierce**	**6**	**7**
2	(United States) L McNeil (Netherlands) C Vis	1	5

Quarterfinals
1	(United States) **L Davenport** (Switzerland) **M Hingis**	**6**	**6**
WC	(United States) K Schlukebir (United States) J Scott	3	0
(Russia) **E Likhovtseva** (Japan) **A Sugiyama**	**6**	**6**
(United States) A Grossman (United States) M Tu	2	1
(United States) E deLone (Australia) N Pratt	5	3
3	(Spain) **C Martínez** (Argentina) **P Tarabini**	**7**	**6**
(Canada) P Hy-Boulais (United States) L Lee	1	3
(South Africa) **A Coetzer** (France) **M Pierce**	**6**	**6**

Semifinals
1	(United States) **L Davenport** (Switzerland) **M Hingis**	**6**	**6**
(Russia) E Likhovtseva (Japan) A Sugiyama	4	4
3	(Spain) **C Martínez** (Argentina) **P Tarabini**	**6**	**6**
(South Africa) A Coetzer (France) M Pierce	4	4

Final
1	(United States) **Lindsay Davenport** (Switzerland) **Martina Hingis**	**6**	**6**
3	(Spain) Conchita Martínez (Argentina) Patricia Tarabini	1	3
