= Charles D. Brown II =

American physicist and advocate

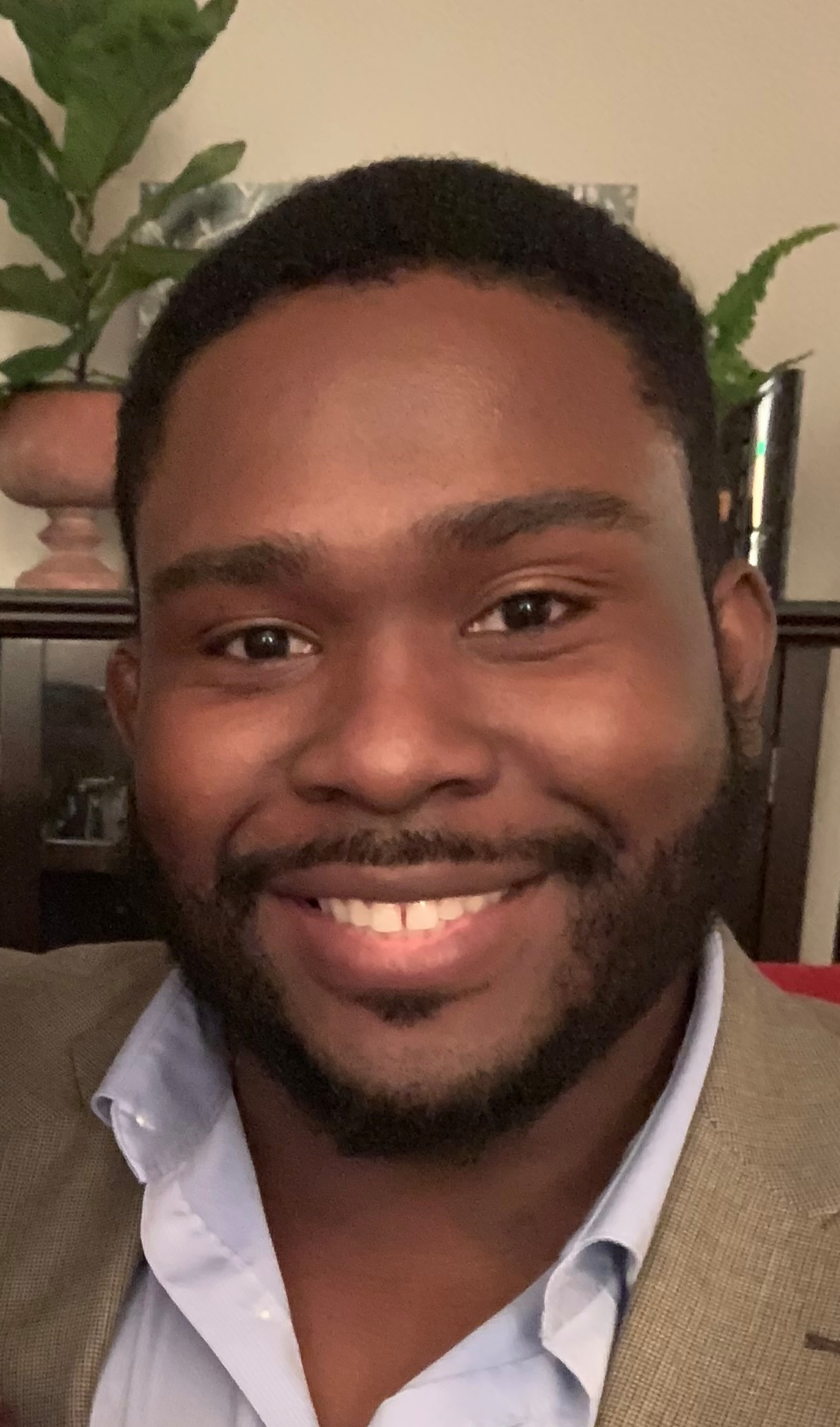
- Education: University of Minnesota, Twin Cities, Yale University
- Scientific career
- Fields: Atomic, molecular, and optical physics, many-body physics, ultracold atoms, optical lattices, quantum simulation, quantum optomechanics
- Workplaces: Yale University
- Thesis: Optical, Mechanical and Thermal Properties of Superfluid Liquid Helium Drops Magnetically-Levitated in Vacuum (2019)
- Doctoral advisor: Jack Harris

Charles D. Brown II is an American physicist and assistant professor at Yale University, studying many-body physics of ultracold atoms in optical lattices and quantum simulation of quantum materials. Brown is also a lead organiser of #BlackInPhysics week, a campaign to recognise and amplify the scientific contributions of Black physicists.

== Early life and education ==
Brown studied physics at the University of Minnesota, Twin Cities, receiving a Bachelor of Science in 2013. During his undergraduate studies, he carried out a 10-week research placement at the University of Chicago supported by the National Science Foundation.

He obtained a PhD in physics from Yale University in 2019, working in the group of Jack Harris on quantum fluid dynamics. His thesis investigated the optomechanical properties of superfluid liquid helium drops, specifically studying the interaction between optical modes and surface vibrations of magnetically levitated superfluid drops.

Brown received the Leigh Page Prize (2013) and the D. Allan Bromley Fellowship for Graduate Research in Physics (2017) from Yale. He was awarded a National Science Foundation Graduate Research Fellowship in 2014 and a Ford Foundation Dissertation Fellowship in 2018.

During his graduate studies, Brown was a student representative on the Board of the National Society of Black Physicists. He also co-founded the Yale League of Black Scientists.

== Research career ==
=== Postdoctoral research ===
From 2019 to 2022, Brown was a postdoctoral fellow in the group of Dan Stamper-Kurn at the University of California, Berkeley, where he studied ultracold atoms trapped in two-dimensional optical lattices. His research focused on many-body physics phenomena of atoms in optical lattices with kagome geometries. During this time he received a Ford Foundation Postdoctoral Fellowship (2020) and the Quantum Creators Prize from the University of Chicago's Chicago Quantum Exchange (2021).

=== Yale faculty ===
Brown joined the Department of Physics at Yale University as an assistant professor in January 2023. His research group uses ultracold atoms trapped in optical lattice potentials to perform quantum simulation experiments, exploring how geometry and topology affect emergent properties in exotic quantum materials. The group is constructing experiments to study the physics of quasicrystals using ultracold atoms in optical quasicrystal lattice potentials. Brown is a member of the Yale Quantum Institute and of Yale's Wright Laboratory.

== Advocacy ==
Brown was one of the organisers of the first #BlackInPhysics Week, held between 25 and 31 October 2020 alongside Jessica Esquivel and Eileen Gonzales. The campaign was inspired by the success of Black Birders Week, and set out to increase the visibility and recognition of Black physicists and their contributions to physics, as well as providing a community of collaboration and support for Black physicists worldwide. The initiative gained widespread media coverage and support from organisations such as Nature Physics, Physics World, Physics Today, and the American Institute of Physics.

Brown is a member of the National Society of Black Physicists and serves as an at-large director on the board of the American Institute of Physics.

== Awards and honors ==
- 2013 – Leigh Page Prize, Yale University
- 2014 – National Science Foundation Graduate Research Fellowship
- 2017 – D. Allan Bromley Fellowship for Graduate Research in Physics, Yale University
- 2018 – Ford Foundation Dissertation Fellowship
- 2020 – Ford Foundation Postdoctoral Fellowship
- 2021 – Quantum Creators Prize, University of Chicago / Chicago Quantum Exchange
- 2022 – Chancellor's Award for Civic Engagement, University of California, Berkeley
- 2023 – Joseph A. Johnson Award for Excellence, American Institute of Physics / National Society of Black Physicists
- 2024 – Air Force Office of Scientific Research Young Investigator Program Award
- 2024 – National Science Foundation CAREER Award
