= 1996 Bank of the West Classic =

- Date: November 4–10
- Edition: 25th
- Category: Tier II
- Draw: 28S / 16D
- Prize money: $450,000
- Surface: Carpet / indoor
- Location: Oakland, CA, U.S.

Champions

Singles
- (Switzerland) Martina Hingis

Doubles
- (United States) Lindsay Davenport (United States) Mary Joe Fernández
← 1995 ·	Stanford Classic	· 1997 →

The 1996 Bank of the West Classic was a women's tennis tournament played on indoor carpet courts at the Oakland-Alameda County Coliseum Arena in Oakland, California in the United States that was part of Tier II of the 1996 WTA Tour. It was the 25th edition of the tournament and was held from November 4 through November 10, 1996. Third-seeded Martina Hingis won the singles title.

== Finals ==
=== Singles ===
(Switzerland) Martina Hingis defeated (United States) Monica Seles 6–2, 6–0

- It was Hingis' 2nd singles title of the year and of her career.

=== Doubles ===
(United States) Lindsay Davenport / (United States) Mary Joe Fernández defeated (Romania) Irina Spîrlea / (France) Nathalie Tauziat 6–1, 6–3

- It was Davenport's 7th title of the year and the 17th of her career. It was Fernández's 4th title of the year and the 22nd of her career.
