= 1997 Bank of the West Classic – Singles =

Singles
- 1997 Bank of the West Classic

Final
- Champion: (Switzerland) Martina Hingis
- Runner-up: (Spain) Conchita Martínez
- Score: 6–0, 6–2

Details
- Draw: 28
- Seeds: 8

Events
Singles	Doubles
← 1996 ·	Bank of the West Classic	· 1998 →

Martina Hingis was the defending champion and won in the final 6–0, 6–2 against Conchita Martínez.

== Seeds ==
A champion seed is indicated in bold text while text in italics indicates the round in which that seed was eliminated. The top four seeds received a bye to the second round.

1. (Switzerland) **Martina Hingis (champion)**
2. (United States) Monica Seles (quarterfinals)
3. (South Africa) Amanda Coetzer (semifinals)
4. (United States) Lindsay Davenport (semifinals)
5. (France) Mary Pierce (first round)
6. (Spain) Conchita Martínez (final)
7. (United States) Kimberly Po (quarterfinals)
8. (United States) Lisa Raymond (second round)

== Draw ==
=== Key ===
- Q = Qualifier
- WC = Wild card
- LL = Lucky loser
- Alt = Alternate
- ITF = ITF entry
- PR = Protected ranking
- SR = Special ranking
- SE = Special exempt
- JE = Junior exempt
- JR = Junior Accelerator Programme entrant
- CO = College Accelerator Programme entrant
- NG = Next Gen Accelerator Program entrant
- w/o = Walkover
- r = Retired
- d = Defaulted

=== Final ===
Final
1	(Switzerland) **Martina Hingis**	**6**	**6**
6	(Spain) Conchita Martínez	0	2

=== Section 1 ===
First round
Q	(Canada) J Nejedly	0	3
(Bulgaria) **M Maleeva**	**6**	**6**
WC	(United States) L McNeil	4	5
(United States) **L Wild**	**6**	**7**
WC	(Luxembourg) **A Kremer**	3	**6**	**6**
5	(France) M Pierce	**6**	1	4
(United States) A Grossman	2	2
LL	(United States) **S Cacic**	**6**	**6**
(Russia) **E Likhovtseva**	**6**	**6**
(Canada) P Hy-Boulais	3	2
(Italy) F Lubiani	4	3
8	(United States) **L Raymond**	**6**	**6**

Second round
1	(Switzerland) **M Hingis**	**6**	**6**
(Bulgaria) M Maleeva	1	2
(United States) **L Wild**	**6**	**6**
WC	(Luxembourg) A Kremer	3	4
4	(United States) **L Davenport**	**6**	**6**
LL	(United States) S Cacic	2	2
(Russia) **E Likhovtseva**	**6**	**6**
8	(United States) L Raymond	4	3

Quarterfinals
1	(Switzerland) **M Hingis**	**6**	6	**6**
(United States) L Wild	1	**7**	3
4	(United States) **L Davenport**	**7**	**6**
(Russia) E Likhovtseva	6	3

Semifinals
1	(Switzerland) **M Hingis**	**6**	1	**6**
4	(United States) L Davenport	3	**6**	2

=== Section 2 ===
First round
7	(United States) **K Po**	**6**	**6**
Q	(Germany) M Schnitzer	2	4
(United States) A Miller	2	**6**	3
(Japan) **A Sugiyama**	**6**	2	**6**
Q	(United States) E deLone	5	**7**	0
(United States) **M Tu**	**7**	5	**6**
6	(Spain) **C Martínez**	**6**	**6**
Q	(Australia) S Drake-Brockman	3	2
(Japan) N Kijimuta	**6**	0	0
(United States) **A Frazier**	4	**6**	**6**
(Belarus) O Barabanschikova	4	6
(Italy) **R Grande**	**6**	**7**

Second round
7	(United States) **K Po**	**6**	**6**
(Japan) A Sugiyama	3	1
(United States) M Tu	2	0
3	(South Africa) **A Coetzer**	**6**	**6**
6	(Spain) **C Martínez**	**6**	**6**
(United States) A Frazier	1	1
(Italy) R Grande	2	1
2	(United States) **M Seles**	**6**	**6**

Quarterfinals
7	(United States) K Po	5	4
3	(South Africa) **A Coetzer**	**7**	**6**
6	(Spain) **C Martínez**	**7**	**6**
2	(United States) M Seles	6	4

Semifinals
3	(South Africa) A Coetzer	4	0
6	(Spain) **C Martínez**	**6**	**6**
