= 1995 Bank of the West Classic – Doubles =

Doubles
- 1995 Bank of the West Classic

Final
- Champions: (United States) Lori McNeil (Czech Republic) Helena Suková
- Runners-up: (United States) Erica Adams (United States) Zina Garrison-Jackson
- Score: 3–6, 6–4, 6–3

Events
Singles	Doubles
← 1994 ·	Silicon Valley Classic	· 1996 →

Lindsay Davenport and Arantxa Sánchez Vicario were the defending champions, but Sánchez Vicario did not compete this year. Davenport teamed up with Irina Spîrlea and lost in the quarterfinals to Kathy Rinaldi-Stunkel and Jill Hetherington.

Lori McNeil and Helena Suková won the title by defeating Erica Adams and Zina Garrison-Jackson 3–6, 6–4, 6–3 in the final.

== Seeds ==
The first two seeds received a bye to the second round.

1. (United States) Lindsay Davenport / (Romania) Irina Spîrlea (quarterfinals)
2. (United States) Mary Joe Fernández / (United States) Pam Shriver (semifinals)
3. (United States) Lori McNeil / (Czech Republic) Helena Suková (champions)
4. (United States) Erica Adams / (United States) Zina Garrison (final)

== Draw ==
=== Key ===
- Q = Qualifier
- WC = Wild card
- LL = Lucky loser
- Alt = Alternate
- SE = Special exempt
- PR = Protected ranking
- ITF = ITF entry
- JE = Junior exempt
- w/o = Walkover
- r = Retired
- d = Defaulted
- SR = Special ranking

=== Draw ===
First round
(United Kingdom) V Lake (South Africa) R Nideffer	2	1
(United States) K Rinaldi-Stunkel (Canada) J Hetherington	6	6
3	(United States) L McNeil (Czech Republic) H Suková	6	6
(Japan) Y Kamio (Argentina) F Labat	3	1
(Romania) C Cristea (United States) T Whitlinger-Jones	4	6	6
(United States) A Bleszynski (United States) K Schlukebir	6	2	2
(Italy) R Grande (Hungary) A Temesvári	2	6	7
(Sweden) M Lindström (Sweden) M Strandlund	6	3	6
(United States) E Hakami (United States) J Watanabe	5	6
4	(United States) E Adams (United States) Z Garrison-Jackson	7	7
(United States) A Frazier (United States) K Po	1	6	3
(Germany) C Singer (United States) L Wild	6	1	6

Quarterfinals
1	(United States) L Davenport (Romania) I Spîrlea	5	1
(United States) K Rinaldi-Stunkel (Canada) J Hetherington	7	6
3	(United States) L McNeil (Czech Republic) H Suková	6	6
(Romania) C Cristea (United States) T Whitlinger-Jones	3	1
(Italy) R Grande (Hungary) A Temesvári	4	6	4
4	(United States) E Adams (United States) Z Garrison-Jackson	6	3	6
(Germany) C Singer (United States) L Wild	1	5
2	(United States) MJ Fernández (United States) P Shriver	6	7

Semifinals
(United States) K Rinaldi-Stunkel (Canada) J Hetherington	5	3
3	(United States) L McNeil (Czech Republic) H Suková	7	6
4	(United States) E Adams (United States) Z Garrison-Jackson	w	/	o
2	(United States) MJ Fernández (United States) P Shriver

Final
3	(United States) L McNeil (Czech Republic) H Suková	3	6	6
4	(United States) E Adams (United States) Z Garrison-Jackson	6	4	3
