= Eileen Gonzales =

American astrophysicist

- Education: City University of New York, San Francisco State University
- Scientific career
- Fields: Astrophysics, astronomy, exoplanets, brown dwarves, low-mass stars
- Workplaces: Cornell University, American Museum of Natural History
- Thesis: Understanding Atmospheres Across the Stellar-Substellar Boundary (2020)
- Doctoral advisor: Jacqueline K. Faherty

Eileen Gonzales is an American astrophysicist and postdoctoral fellow at the Department of Astronomy at Cornell University, where her research focuses on exoplanets and brown dwarfs. She is also a co-founder and lead organizer of #BlackInPhysics, a campaign to recognize and celebrate Black physicists and amplify their work.

== Early life and education ==
Gonzales grew up in Virginia Beach, Virginia. She studied astrophysics at Michigan State University, and obtained her Master's in Physics from San Francisco State University. She joined the Graduate Center of the City University of New York for her graduate studies, obtaining an MA from Hunter College, an MPhil in Physics, and her PhD in 2020. During her doctoral research, she investigated the atmospheric conditions of low-mass stars and brown dwarves.

== Research career ==
Gonzales is a 51 Pegasi b Fellow at the Department of Astronomy at Cornell University, where she combines techniques and knowledge from observational astronomy and theoretical astrophysics to study the atmospheric conditions of exoplanets. In particular, she works on translating techniques initially developed to study the clouds of brown dwarfs to study atmosphere of other substellar objects, such as gas giant exoplanets. She is also a visiting scientist at the American Museum of Natural History.

== Outreach and advocacy ==
Gonzales is involved with science education and outreach programs. During her doctoral studies she worked at the American Museum of Natural History, supervising and mentoring high school students and teaching astronomy.

Gonzales was also a lead organizer of the first #BlackInPhysics Week alongside Charles D. Brown II and Jessica Esquivel, leading an initiative that aimed to increase the recognition of Black physicists and celebrate their contributions to science. The campaign was inspired by the success of similar #BlackInX programs, such as Black Birders Week, and was supported by organizations including Nature Physics, the American Institute of Physics, Physics Today, and Physics World. BlackInPhysics also set out to create a community of support for Black physicists, raise awareness of the social and political challenges faced by Black physicists, and provide more visibility to Black role models in science.
