= Jessica Esquivel =

Mexican physicist

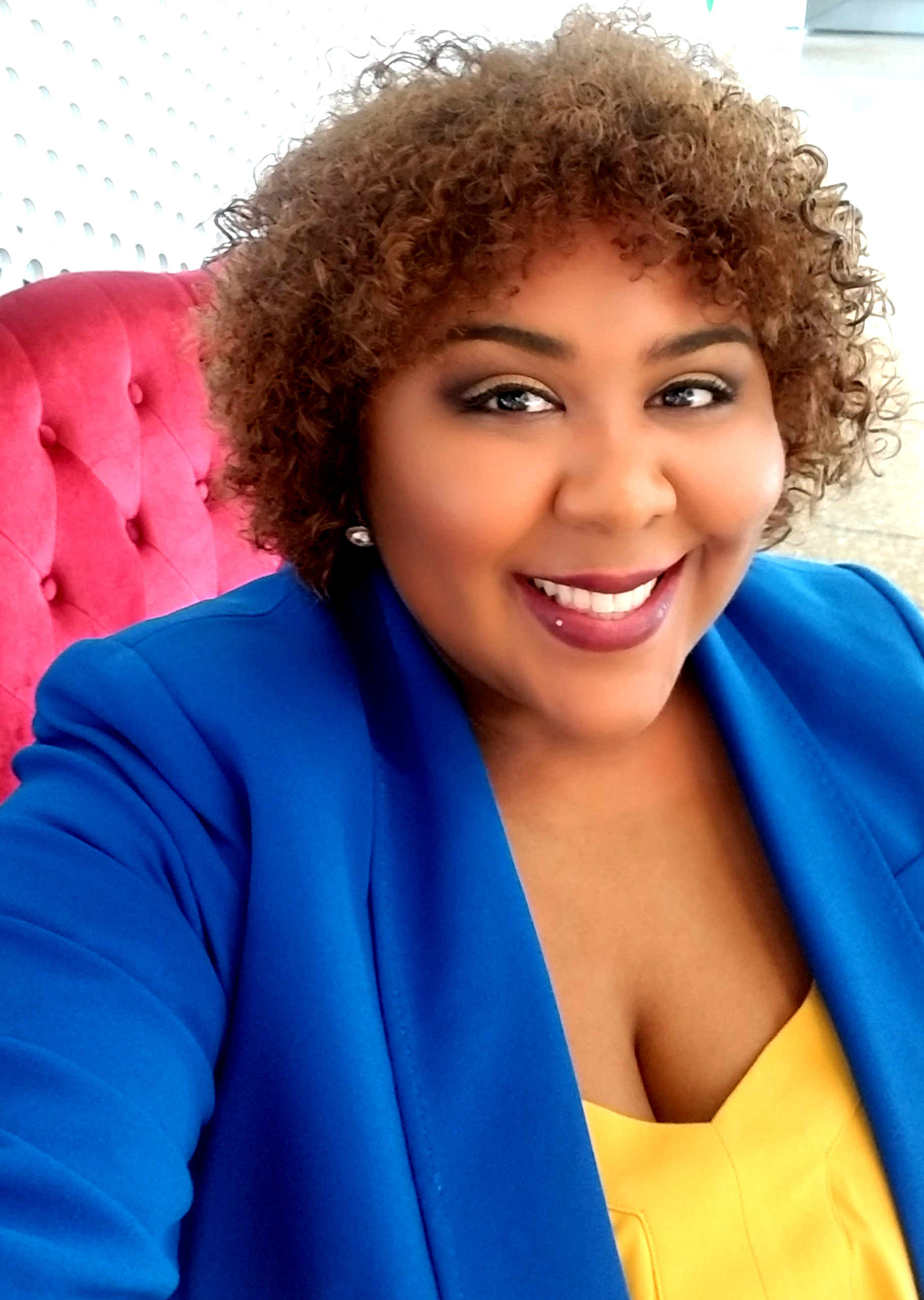
- Education: St Mary's University, Texas, Syracuse University
- Scientific career
- Fields: Particle physics, neutrino physics, machine learning
- Workplaces: Fermilab
- Thesis: Muon/Pion separation using Convolutional Neural Networks for the MicroBooNE Charged Current Inclusive Cross Section Measurement (2018)
- Doctoral advisor: Mitchell Soderberg

Jessica Esquivel is a Black Mexican and American physicist and science communicator, working at the Muon g-2 particle physics experiment at Fermilab. She is an advocate for gender and racial equity in science, and a lead organiser of #BlackInPhysics, a campaign to recognize and amplify the work of Black physicists worldwide. She was also selected as an AAAS IF/THEN Ambassador in 2019.

== Early life and education ==
Esquivel was interested in science and engineering from a young age, inspired by science-fiction films and space exploration. She attended science camps as a child, and studied high school at the Science Academy of South Texas.

She obtained her Bachelor of Science from St. Mary's University, Texas in 2011, with a double major in electrical engineering and applied physics.

Esquivel received a PhD in physics from Syracuse University in 2018, where her doctoral research focused on developing and applying machine learning methods to improve data analysis in particle physics experiments. Specifically, she used convolutional neural networks to analyze data from MicroBooNE neutrino detection experiments. She was awarded a University Research Association Visiting Scholars Program Scholarship (2016) and Neutrino Physics Center Fellowship (2017) during her PhD.

== Research career ==
In 2018, Esquivel joined Fermilab, where she works on the Muon g-2 project. This experiment aims to test the current theories of the Standard Model of particle physics by measuring the anomalous magnetic dipole moment of muon particles to a high degree of accuracy. She has also spent her years at Fermilab focused on initiatives aimed at workforce training and diversity, equity, and inclusion (DEI) projects.

== Outreach and advocacy ==
Throughout her doctoral studies and research career, Esquivel has participated in a variety of science education and outreach programs. During her PhD, she published a series of blog posts about her experiences as a graduate student for the website Interactions.org. In 2018, she received an award from the Fermilab Friends for Science Education, recognizing her contributions to Fermilab's K-12 education and outreach program. She represented Fermilab at Wakandacon 2019, a three-day convention celebrating Afro-futurism, science, technology, and Black culture. In 2021, she was featured on the show Mission Unstoppable with Miranda Cosgrove aired by CBS.

Esquivel is also a vocal advocate for increasing equity and diversity in science and has worked to improve the experiences of women, gender minorities, LGBT+ and Black people in science. She proudly identifies as a Black, Mexican, lesbian woman. She was one of 125 women awarded an IF/THEN Ambassadorship by the American Association for the Advancement of Science in 2019. She was selected to represent the US delegation at the 2020 International Conference on Women in Physics, organised by International Union of Pure and Applied Physics.

In 2020, Esquivel was one of the leaders of the inaugural #BlackInPhysics Week, along with Charles D. Brown II and Eileen Gonzales. The campaign, inspired by Black Birders Week and other #BlackInX initiatives, aimed to increase the celebrate the contributions of Black physicists and amplify their work. BIPW was widely reported on and supported by Physics World, Nature Physics, the American Institute of Physics. Esquivel is also a member of Change Now Physics, a team of Black physicists campaigning for racial equity at Fermilab.

== Awards ==
- American Association for the Advancement of Science IF/THEN Ambassadorship, 2019
