= 1997 Bank of the West Classic =

- Date: July 21–27
- Edition: 26th
- Draw: 28S / 16D
- Prize money: $450,000
- Surface: Hard / outdoor
- Location: Stanford, CA, U.S.
- Venue: Taube Tennis Center

Champions

Singles
- (Switzerland) Martina Hingis

Doubles
- (United States) Lindsay Davenport / (Switzerland) Martina Hingis
← 1996 ·	Stanford Classic	· 1998 →

The 1997 Bank of the West Classic was a women's tennis tournament played on outdoor hardcourts at the Taube Tennis Center in Stanford, California in the United States that was part of the Tier II category of the 1997 WTA Tour. It was the 26th edition of the tournament and was held from July 21 through July 27, 1997. First-seeded Martina Hingis won her second consecutive singles title at the event.

== Finals ==
=== Singles ===
(Switzerland) Martina Hingis defeated (Spain) Conchita Martínez 6–0, 6–2

- It was Hingis' 8th singles title of the year and the 10th of her career.

=== Doubles ===
(United States) Lindsay Davenport / (Switzerland) Martina Hingis defeated (Spain) Conchita Martínez / (Argentina) Patricia Tarabini 6–1, 6–3

- It was Davenport's 5th doubles title of the year and the 16th of her career. It was Hingis' 4th doubles title of the year and the 7th of her career.
