= 1996 Bank of the West Classic – Singles =

Singles
- 1996 Bank of the West Classic

Final
- Champion: (Switzerland) Martina Hingis
- Runner-up: (United States) Monica Seles
- Score: 6–2, 6–0

Details
- Draw: 28
- Seeds: 8

Events
| Singles | Doubles |
| ← 1995 · | Bank of the West Classic | · 1997 → |

Magdalena Maleeva was the defending champion but lost in the first round to Kimberly Po.

Martina Hingis won in the final 6–2, 6–0 against Monica Seles.

== Seeds ==
A champion seed is indicated in bold text while text in italics indicates the round in which that seed was eliminated. The top four seeds received a bye to the second round.

1. (United States) Monica Seles (final)
2. (United States) Lindsay Davenport (quarterfinals)
3. (Switzerland) **Martina Hingis (champion)**
4. (United States) Mary Joe Fernández (second round)
5. (Netherlands) Brenda Schultz-McCarthy (semifinals)
6. (Bulgaria) Magdalena Maleeva (first round)
7. (United States) Chanda Rubin (first round)
8. (Slovakia) Karina Habšudová (first round)

== Draw ==
=== Key ===
- Q = Qualifier
- WC = Wild card
- LL = Lucky loser
- Alt = Alternate
- SE = Special exempt
- PR = Protected ranking
- ITF = ITF entry
- JE = Junior exempt
- w/o = Walkover
- r = Retired
- d = Defaulted
- SR = Special ranking

=== Final ===
| Final |
| 1 | (United States) Monica Seles | 2 | 0 |
| 3 | (Switzerland) **Martina Hingis** | **6** | **6** |

=== Section 1 ===
First round
(Canada) **P Hy-Boulais** | **6** | 6 | **6**
(United States) Z Garrison-Jackson | 4 | **7** | 4
Q | (United States) **M Werdel-Witmeyer** | **7** | **6**
Q | (Slovenia) B Mulej | 6 | 2
(United States) **K Po** | **6** | **6**
6 | (Bulgaria) M Maleeva | 0 | 2
(Russia) **E Likhovtseva** | 2 | **7** | **6**
(Japan) A Sugiyama | **6** | 6 | 2
(Indonesia) Y Basuki | 1 | **6** | 2
(Argentina) **P Suárez** | **6** | 1 | **6**
(Romania) **I Spîrlea** | **6** | **6**
8 | (Slovakia) K Habšudová | 4 | 2

Second round
1 | (United States) **M Seles** | **6** | **6**
(Canada) P Hy-Boulais | 1 | 2
Q | (United States) M Werdel-Witmeyer | 4 | 4
(United States) **K Po** | **6** | **6**
4 | (United States) M J Fernández | 3 | 1
(Russia) **E Likhovtseva** | **6** | **6**
(Argentina) P Suárez | 2 | 1
(Romania) **I Spîrlea** | **6** | **6**

Quarterfinals
1 | (United States) **M Seles** | **6** | **7**
(United States) K Po | 2 | 5
(Russia) E Likhovtseva | 2 | 4
(Romania) **I Spîrlea** | **6** | **6**

Semifinals
1 | (United States) **M Seles** | **6** | **6**
(Romania) I Spîrlea | 3 | 3

=== Section 2 ===
First round
7 | (United States) C Rubin | 2 | 6
(United States) **L Wild** | **6** | **7**
(Australia) R Stubbs | 2 | **7** | 3
WC | (United States) **P Shriver** | **6** | 6 | **6**
(Slovakia) K Studeníková | 1 | 1
(United States) **A Miller** | **6** | **6**
5 | (Netherlands) **B Schultz-McCarthy** | 1 | **6** | **6**
WC | (United States) V Williams | **6** | 4 | 4
Q | (Slovakia) **R Zrubáková** | **6** | **6**
Q | (United States) L Poruri | 4 | 4
(France) N Tauziat | 6 | 2
(United States) **A Frazier** | **7** | **6**

Second round
(United States) **L Wild** | **6** | **6**
WC | (United States) P Shriver | 3 | 0
(United States) A Miller | 4 | 4
3 | (Switzerland) **M Hingis** | **6** | **6**
5 | (Netherlands) **B Schultz-McCarthy** | **6** | **6**
Q | (Slovakia) R Zrubáková | 2 | 4
(United States) A Frazier | 1 | 4
2 | (United States) **L Davenport** | **6** | **6**

Quarterfinals
(United States) L Wild | 3 | 2
3 | (Switzerland) **M Hingis** | **6** | **6**
5 | (Netherlands) **B Schultz-McCarthy** | **6** | **6**
2 | (United States) L Davenport | 2 | 4

Semifinals
3 | (Switzerland) **M Hingis** | **7** | **6**
5 | (Netherlands) B Schultz-McCarthy | 6 | 3
