= 1998 Bank of the West Classic – Doubles =

Doubles
- 1998 Bank of the West Classic

Final
- Champions: (United States) Lindsay Davenport (Belarus) Natasha Zvereva
- Runners-up: (Latvia) Larisa Neiland (Ukraine) Elena Tatarkova
- Score: 6–4, 6–4

Details
- Draw: 16
- Seeds: 4

Events
Singles	Doubles
- Bank of the West Classic

Lindsay Davenport and Martina Hingis were the reigning champions, but only Davenport competed that year with Natasha Zvereva.

Davenport and Zvereva won in the final 6–4, 6–4 against Larisa Neiland and Elena Tatarkova.

== Seeds ==
Champion seeds are indicated in bold text while text in italics indicates the round in which those seeds were eliminated.

1. (United States) **Lindsay Davenport** / (Belarus) **Natasha Zvereva (champions)**
2. (Russia) Elena Likhovtseva / (Japan) Ai Sugiyama (first round)
3. (United States) Debbie Graham / (Netherlands) Caroline Vis (semifinals)
4. (Latvia) Larisa Neiland / (Ukraine) Elena Tatarkova (final)

== Draw ==
Key

- Q = Qualifier
- WC = Wild card
- LL = Lucky loser
- Alt = Alternate
- ITF = ITF entry
- PR = Protected ranking
- SR = Special ranking
- SE = Special exempt
- JE = Junior exempt
- JR = Junior Accelerator Programme entrant
- CO = College Accelerator Programme entrant
- NG = Next Gen Accelerator Program entrant
- w/o = Walkover
- r = Retired
- d = Defaulted

First round
1	(United States) **L Davenport** (Belarus) **N Zvereva**	**6**	**6**
WC	(United States) A Bleszynski (United States) J Scott	1	4
(Japan) **M Saeki** (Japan) **Y Yoshida**	4	**6**	**6**
(United States) M J Fernández (Argentina) P Tarabini	**6**	2	4
3	(United States) **D Graham** (Netherlands) **C Vis**	**6**	3	**6**
(Argentina) M Paz (Thailand) T Tanasugarn	3	**6**	1
(Croatia) **M Murić** (Bulgaria) **P Stoyanova**	**6**	**6**
(United States) M Mazzotta (Thailand) B Sangaram	3	3
Q	(United States) J Chi (United States) A Frazier	4	**6**	4
(United States) **E deLone** (Canada) **S Jeyaseelan**	**6**	3	**6**
(Chinese Taipei) J Lee (United States) L Lee	4	4
4	(Latvia) **L Neiland** (Ukraine) **E Tatarkova**	**6**	**6**
(United States) S Cacic (France) A-G Sidot	**6**	3	2
(Australia) **K Kunce** (United States) **C Morariu**	4	**6**	**6**
(United States) **K Po** (Australia) **N Pratt**	2	**6**	**6**
2	(Russia) E Likhovtseva (Japan) A Sugiyama	**6**	1	0

Quarterfinals
1	(United States) **L Davenport** (Belarus) **N Zvereva**	**6**	**6**
(Japan) M Saeki (Japan) Y Yoshida	1	0
3	(United States) **D Graham** (Netherlands) **C Vis**	**6**	**6**
(Croatia) M Murić (Bulgaria) P Stoyanova	4	3
(United States) E deLone (Canada) S Jeyaseelan	5	2
4	(Latvia) **L Neiland** (Ukraine) **E Tatarkova**	**7**	**6**
(Australia) K Kunce (United States) C Morariu	6	**6**	3
(United States) **K Po** (Australia) **N Pratt**	**7**	2	**6**

Semifinals
1	(United States) **L Davenport** (Belarus) **N Zvereva**	**7**	**6**
3	(United States) D Graham (Netherlands) C Vis	6	4
4	(Latvia) **L Neiland** (Ukraine) **E Tatarkova**	**6**	**6**
(United States) K Po (Australia) N Pratt	0	2

Final
1	(United States) **Lindsay Davenport** (Belarus) **Natasha Zvereva**	**6**	**6**
4	(Latvia) Larisa Neiland (Ukraine) Elena Tatarkova	4	4
