= 1995 Bank of the West Classic – Singles =

Singles
- 1995 Bank of the West Classic

Final
- Champion: (Bulgaria) Magdalena Maleeva
- Runner-up: (Japan) Ai Sugiyama
- Score: 6–3, 6–4

Details
- Draw: 28
- Seeds: 8

Events
Singles	Doubles
← 1994 ·	Silicon Valley Classic	· 1996 →

Arantxa Sánchez Vicario was the defending champion, but did not compete this year.

Magdalena Maleeva won the title by defeating Ai Sugiyama 6–3, 6–4 in the final.

== Seeds ==
The first four seeds received a bye to the second round.

1. (United States) Monica Seles (withdrew)
2. (Bulgaria) Magdalena Maleeva (champion)
3. (United States) Lindsay Davenport (semifinals, withdrew)
4. (United States) Mary Joe Fernández (semifinals)
5. (United States) Amy Frazier (second round)
6. (Romania) Irina Spîrlea (second round)
7. (Czech Republic) Helena Suková (quarterfinals)
8. (Japan) Yone Kamio (first round)

== Draw ==
=== Key ===
- Q = Qualifier
- WC = Wild card
- LL = Lucky loser
- Alt = Alternate
- SE = Special exempt
- PR = Protected ranking
- ITF = ITF entry
- JE = Junior exempt
- w/o = Walkover
- r = Retired
- d = Defaulted
- SR = Special ranking

=== Finals ===
Semifinals
(Japan) Ai Sugiyama	w/o
3	(United States) Lindsay Davenport
4	(United States) Mary Joe Fernández	7	2	4
2	(Bulgaria) Magdalena Maleeva	5	6	6

Final
(Japan) Ai Sugiyama	3	4
2	(Bulgaria) Magdalena Maleeva	6	6

=== Top half ===
First round
(United States) Z Garrison-Jackson	6	3	6
(Venezuela) M Vento	3	6	3
(Japan) A Sugiyama	6	6
(Romania) C Cristea	4	4
(Japan) K Nagatsuka	2	3
6	(Romania) I Spîrlea	6	6
(United States) T Whitlinger-Jones	6	7
(Germany) S Hack	3	6
(United States) K Po	6	6
(Hungary) A Temesvári	1	4
(United States) J Watanabe	3	6
7	(Czech Republic) H Suková	6	7

Second round
(United States) K Adams	6	2	2
(United States) Z Garrison-Jackson	3	6	6
(Japan) A Sugiyama	6	4	6
6	(Romania) I Spîrlea	4	6	1
3	(United States) L Davenport	7	6
(United States) T Whitlinger-Jones	5	1
(United States) K Po	7	6	2
7	(Czech Republic) H Suková	5	7	6

Quarterfinals
(United States) Z Garrison-Jackson	2	6	4
(Japan) A Sugiyama	6	4	6
3	(United States) L Davenport	6	6
7	(Czech Republic) H Suková	4	3

Semifinals
(Japan) A Sugiyama	w/o
3	(United States) L Davenport

=== Bottom half ===
First round
8	(Japan) Y Kamio	2	1
(United States) P Shriver	6	6
(United States) L Wild	7	7
(Italy) R Grande	6	6
(United States) P Nelson	2	5
(Germany) C Singer	6	7
5	(United States) A Frazier	6	6
(Argentina) F Labat	4	4
(South Africa) R Nideffer	2	1
(United States) V Williams	6	6
(Sweden) M Strandlund	4	1
(United States) L McNeil	6	6

Second round
(United States) P Shriver	7	5	6
(United States) L Wild	6	7	7
(Germany) C Singer	0	3
4	(United States) MJ Fernández	6	6
5	(United States) A Frazier	6	3	3
(United States) V Williams	4	6	6
(United States) L McNeil	1	4
2	(Bulgaria) M Maleeva	6	6

Quarterfinals
(United States) L Wild	2	6	1
4	(United States) MJ Fernández	6	2	6
(United States) V Williams	2	3
2	(Bulgaria) M Maleeva	6	6

Semifinals
4	(United States) MJ Fernández	7	2	4
2	(Bulgaria) M Maleeva	5	6	6
