= 1998 Bank of the West Classic =

- Date: July 27 – August 2
- Edition: 27th
- Category: Tier II
- Draw: 28S / 16D
- Prize money: $450,000
- Surface: Hard / outdoor
- Location: Stanford, California, U.S.
- Venue: Taube Tennis Center

Champions

Singles
- (United States) Lindsay Davenport

Doubles
- (United States) Lindsay Davenport / (Belarus) Natasha Zvereva
| ← 1997 · | Bank of the West Classic | · 1999 → |

The 1998 Bank of the West Classic was a tennis tournament played on outdoor hard courts at the Taube Tennis Center in Stanford, California in the United States that was part of Tier II of the 1998 WTA Tour. It was the 27th edition of the tournament and was held from July 27 through August 2, 1998. First-seeded Lindsay Davenport won the singles title.

== Finals ==
=== Singles ===
(United States) Lindsay Davenport defeated (United States) Venus Williams 6–4, 5–7, 6–4

- It was Davenport's 4th title of the year and the 35th of her career.

=== Doubles ===
(United States) Lindsay Davenport / (Belarus) Natasha Zvereva defeated (Latvia) Larisa Neiland / (Ukraine) Elena Tatarkova 6–4, 6–4

- It was Davenport's 5th title of the year and the 36th of her career. It was Zvereva's 3rd title of the year and the 76th of her career.
