= 1996 Bank of the West Classic – Doubles =

Doubles
- 1996 Bank of the West Classic
- 1995 Champions: (United States) Lori McNeil (Czech Republic) Helena Suková

Final
- Champions: (United States) Lindsay Davenport (United States) Mary Joe Fernández
- Runners-up: (Romania) Irina Spîrlea (France) Nathalie Tauziat
- Score: 6–1, 6–3

Events
Singles	Doubles
← 1995 ·	Bank of the West Classic	· 1997 →

Lori McNeil and Helena Suková were the defending champions but did not compete that year.

Lindsay Davenport and Mary Joe Fernández won in the final 6–1, 6–3 against Irina Spîrlea and Nathalie Tauziat.

== Seeds ==
Champion seeds are indicated in bold text while text in italics indicates the round in which those seeds were eliminated.

1. (United States) **Lindsay Davenport** / (United States) **Mary Joe Fernández (champions)**
2. (United States) Chanda Rubin / (Netherlands) Brenda Schultz-McCarthy (first round)
3. (Indonesia) Yayuk Basuki / (Netherlands) Caroline Vis (semifinals)
4. (Australia) Elizabeth Smylie / (United States) Linda Wild (first round)

== Draw ==
=== Key ===
- Q = Qualifier
- WC = Wild card
- LL = Lucky loser
- Alt = Alternate
- SE = Special exempt
- PR = Protected ranking
- ITF = ITF entry
- JE = Junior exempt
- w/o = Walkover
- r = Retired
- d = Defaulted
- SR = Special ranking

First round
1	(United States) **L Davenport** (United States) **M J Fernández**	**6**	**6**
(Argentina) L Montalvo (Argentina) P Suárez	0	4
(United States) **A Lettiere** (Japan) **N Miyagi**	**6**	**7**
(Slovakia) K Studeníková (Japan) A Sugiyama	2	6
4	(Australia) E Smylie (United States) L Wild	**6**	1	6
(United States) **K Adams** (United States) **Z Garrison-Jackson**	4	**6**	**7**
(Canada) **J Hetherington** (United States) **K Rinaldi-Stunkel**	**6**	**6**
(United States) M Werdel-Witmeyer (United States) T Whitlinger-Jones	1	4
(Canada) P Hy-Boulais (South Africa) R Nideffer	2	3
(Japan) **R Hiraki** (Russia) **E Likhovtseva**	**6**	**6**
(Slovakia) K Habšudová (United States) P Shriver	1	6
3	(Indonesia) **Y Basuki** (Netherlands) **C Vis**	**6**	**7**
(United States) **A Frazier** (United States) **K Po**	**6**	**6**
(United States) L Osterloh (United States) K Schlukebir	1	4
(Romania) **I Spîrlea** (France) **N Tauziat**	**6**	**6**
2	(United States) C Rubin (Netherlands) B Schultz-McCarthy	3	3

Quarterfinals
1	(United States) **L Davenport** (United States) **M J Fernández**	**6**	**6**
(United States) A Lettiere (Japan) N Miyagi	1	3
(United States) K Adams (United States) Z Garrison-Jackson	5	**7**	1
(Canada) **J Hetherington** (United States) **K Rinaldi-Stunkel**	**7**	5	**6**
(Japan) R Hiraki (Russia) E Likhovtseva	6	1
3	(Indonesia) **Y Basuki** (Netherlands) **C Vis**	**7**	**6**
(United States) A Frazier (United States) K Po	3	2
(Romania) **I Spîrlea** (France) **N Tauziat**	**6**	**6**

Semifinals
1	(United States) **L Davenport** (United States) **M J Fernández**	**6**	**6**
(Canada) J Hetherington (United States) K Rinaldi-Stunkel	2	1
3	(Indonesia) Y Basuki (Netherlands) C Vis	4	4
(Romania) **I Spîrlea** (France) **N Tauziat**	**6**	**6**

Final
1	(United States) **Lindsay Davenport** (United States) **Mary Joe Fernández**	**6**	**6**
(Romania) Irina Spîrlea (France) Nathalie Tauziat	1	3
