= Jack Harris (physicist) =

American physicist

Jack G. E. Harris
- Born: New York City, United States
- Citizenship: American
- Education: Cornell University (BS, 1994); University of California, Santa Barbara (PhD, 2000)
- Known for: Membrane-in-the-middle optomechanics Persistent current measurements in normal metals Superfluid helium optomechanics Non-Hermitian physics
- Awards: Vannevar Bush Faculty Fellowship (2019); APS Fellow (2016); Sloan Research Fellowship (2007)
- Scientific career
- Fields: Quantum optomechanics Condensed matter physics
- Workplaces: Yale University
- Doctoral advisor: David Awschalom
- Website: harrislab.yale.edu

Jack G. E. Harris is an American experimental physicist and Professor of Physics and Applied Physics at Yale University, where he is a member of the Yale Quantum Institute and Wright Laboratory. He is known for contributions to the field of quantum optomechanics, including the development of the "membrane-in-the-middle" technique for coupling mechanical oscillators to optical cavities, pioneering high-precision measurements of persistent currents in normal metal rings, and the extension of cavity optomechanics to superfluid helium systems.

== Early life and education ==
Harris was born in New York City and grew up on Martha's Vineyard. He attended Milton Academy, entering as a tenth grader in 1987, where a physics course sparked his interest in the field.

He received his undergraduate degree from Cornell University in 1994. During his undergraduate studies, he spent a summer at SLAC National Accelerator Laboratory working with the accelerator physics group. He earned his Ph.D. at the University of California, Santa Barbara, in 2000, with a dissertation titled High Sensitivity Magnetization Studies of Semiconductor Heterostructures, in which he developed ultrasensitive micromechanical sensors and used them to study quantum Hall systems in the group of David Awschalom.

== Career ==
From 2001 to 2004, Harris was a postdoctoral fellow at the Harvard–MIT Center for Ultracold Atoms, where he worked with John Doyle and Wolfgang Ketterle on a cryogenic atom-trapping experiment. He joined the Yale University faculty in 2004 as Assistant Professor of Physics and Applied Physics. He was promoted to Associate Professor in 2009, and Professor of Physics and Applied Physics in 2017.

== Research ==
=== Membrane-in-the-middle optomechanics ===
Harris's group developed the "membrane-in-the-middle" approach to cavity optomechanics, in which a thin silicon nitride membrane is placed inside a high-finesse optical cavity. This configuration, first demonstrated in a 2008 Nature paper, decouples the stringent requirements on the mechanical and optical elements, allowing high optical finesse and high mechanical quality factor to be achieved simultaneously in a single device. The membrane-in-the-middle geometry also provides fundamentally new functionality, enabling quadratic optomechanical coupling and "position-squared" readout of mechanical motion, a tool that may enable QND-like optical readout of a mechanical oscillator's energy. This technique has since been adopted by optomechanics laboratories worldwide.

=== Persistent currents in normal metals ===
Harris and his group made the first definitive measurements of persistent currents in normal (non-superconducting) metal rings (at the same time as the group of Kathryn Moler), a quantum mechanical effect that had been predicted theoretically but remained controversial due to inconsistent experimental results. Using a novel cantilever torsional magnetometry technique, the team measured persistent currents in individual aluminum rings with sensitivity orders of magnitude greater than previous attempts, over a wide range of temperatures, ring sizes, and magnetic fields. The results, published in Science in 2009, agreed well with theoretical predictions for non-interacting electrons, resolving a long-standing debate in mesoscopic physics.

=== Superfluid helium optomechanics ===
Harris's group extended cavity optomechanics to superfluid helium, demonstrating the first quantum optomechanical effects in a liquid. Using a fiber-based optical cavity filled with superfluid helium, they showed strong coupling between the cavity's optical mode and acoustic modes of the superfluid, observing quantum-level signatures in the acoustic fluctuations. His group has also demonstrated the levitation of millimeter-scale superfluid helium drops in high vacuum, which cool by evaporation and exhibit low mechanical damping.

=== Non-Hermitian physics ===
Harris's research has explored topological phenomena in non-Hermitian systems based on the "membrane-in-the-middle" optomechanical platform. In 2016, his group demonstrated topological energy transfer in an optomechanical system containing an exceptional point, published in Nature. In 2019, his group demonstrated static and tunable nonreciprocal control and cooling of phonon modes, also in Nature.

In a 2022 Nature paper, Harris and collaborator Nicholas Read discovered that the eigenvalue spectrum of coupled oscillators generically form braids and knots when the system's parameters are tuned around closed paths in parameter space. The team experimentally observed trefoil knots and non-commuting braids in an optomechanical resonator, revealing a previously unknown topological characteristic of resonators.

== Selected publications ==
- Co-editor of the book Quantum Optomechanics and Nanomechanics (Oxford University Press), based on the 2015 Les Houches summer school.
- Thompson, J. D.; Zwickl, B. M.; Jayich, A. M.; Marquardt, F.; Girvin, S. M.; Harris, J. G. E. (2008). "Strong dispersive coupling of a high-finesse cavity to a micromechanical membrane". Nature. 452 (7183): 72–75. arXiv:0707.1724. doi:10.1038/nature06715.
- Bleszynski-Jayich, A. C.; Shanks, W. E.; Peaudecerf, B.; Ginossar, E.; von Oppen, F.; Glazman, L.; Harris, J. G. E. (2009). "Persistent Currents in Normal Metal Rings". Science. 326 (5950): 272–275. arXiv:0906.4780. doi:10.1126/science.1178139.
- Xu, H.; Mason, D.; Jiang, L.; Harris, J. G. E. (2016). "Topological energy transfer in an optomechanical system with an exceptional point". Nature. 537: 80–83. arXiv:1602.06881. doi:10.1038/nature18604.
- Kashkanova, A. D.; Shkarin, A. B.; Brown, C. D.; Flowers-Jacobs, N. E.; Childress, L.; Hoch, S. W.; Hohmann, L.; Ott, K.; Reichel, J.; Harris, J. G. E. (2017). "Superfluid Brillouin optomechanics". Nature Physics. 13: 74–79. arXiv:1602.05640. doi:10.1038/nphys3900.
- Patil, Y. S. S.; Höller, J.; Henry, P. A.; Guria, C.; Zhang, Y.; Jiang, L.; Kralj, N.; Read, N.; Harris, J. G. E. (2022). "Measuring the knot of non-Hermitian degeneracies and non-commuting braids". Nature. 607: 271–275. arXiv:2112.00157. doi:10.1038/s41586-022-04796-w.

== Awards and honors ==
- Vannevar Bush Faculty Fellowship, United States Department of Defense (2019)
- Fellow of the American Physical Society (DAMOP), "For pioneering experiments in optomechanics advancing the state-of-the-art in optical manipulation of mechanical quantum motion, and in the measurement of circulating currents in mesoscopic normal metal rings" (2016)
- Arthur Greer Memorial Prize (2009)
- DARPA Young Faculty Award (2009)
- Yale University Junior Faculty Fellowship (2008)
- Sloan Research Fellowship (2007)
