= 1998 Bank of the West Classic – Singles =

Singles
- 1998 Bank of the West Classic

Final
- Champion: (United States) Lindsay Davenport
- Runner-up: (United States) Venus Williams
- Score: 6–4, 5–7, 6–4

Details
- Draw: 28
- Seeds: 8

Events
| Singles | Doubles |
- Bank of the West Classic

Martina Hingis was the reigning champion but did not compete that year.

Lindsay Davenport won in the final 6–4, 5–7, 6–4 against Venus Williams.

== Seeds ==
A champion seed is indicated in bold text while text in italics indicates the round in which that seed was eliminated. The top four seeds received a bye to the second round.

1. (United States) **Lindsay Davenport (champion)**
2. (United States) Monica Seles (semifinals)
3. (United States) Venus Williams (final)
4. (Germany) Steffi Graf (semifinals)
5. (Belarus) Natasha Zvereva (quarterfinals)
6. (South Africa) Joannette Kruger (second round)
7. (Russia) Elena Likhovtseva (quarterfinals)
8. (Italy) Rita Grande (first round)

== Draw ==
Key

- Q = Qualifier
- WC = Wild card
- LL = Lucky loser
- Alt = Alternate
- ITF = ITF entry
- PR = Protected ranking
- SR = Special ranking
- SE = Special exempt
- JE = Junior exempt
- JR = Junior Accelerator Programme entrant
- CO = College Accelerator Programme entrant
- NG = Next Gen Accelerator Program entrant
- w/o = Walkover
- r = Retired
- d = Defaulted

=== Final ===
| Final |
| 1 | (United States) **Lindsay Davenport** | **6** | 5 | **6** |
| 3 | (United States) Venus Williams | 4 | **7** | 4 |

=== Top half ===
First round
(United States) **K Po** | **7** | **6**
(Australia) N Pratt | 5 | 0
(Japan) Y Yoshida | 0 | 3
(Thailand) **T Tanasugarn** | **6** | **6**
Q | (United States) **A Stevenson** | **6** | **7**
8 | (Italy) R Grande | 1 | 5
(United States) **M J Fernández** | **6** | **6**
(United States) C Rubin | 4 | 4
Q | (Ukraine) **E Tatarkova** | **7** | 2 | **7**
(United States) S Cacic | 6 | **6** | 5
(United States) T Snyder | 2 | 4
5 | (Belarus) **N Zvereva** | **6** | **6**

Second round
1 | (United States) **L Davenport** | **6** | **6**
(United States) K Po | 1 | 3
(Thailand) **T Tanasugarn** | **6** | **6**
Q | (United States) A Stevenson | 2 | 0
4 | (Germany) **S Graf** | **6** | **6**
(United States) M J Fernández | 4 | 0
Q | (Ukraine) E Tatarkova | **6** | 4 | 2
5 | (Belarus) **N Zvereva** | 0 | **6** | **6**

Quarterfinals
1 | (United States) **L Davenport** | **7** | **6**
(Thailand) T Tanasugarn | 6 | 1
4 | (Germany) **S Graf** | **6** | **6**
5 | (Belarus) N Zvereva | 1 | 3

Semifinals
1 | (United States) **L Davenport** | **6** | 6 | **6**
4 | (Germany) S Graf | 4 | **7** | 3

=== Bottom half ===
First round
7 | (Russia) **E Likhovtseva** | **6** | 4 | **6**
WC | (United States) M Irvin | 1 | **6** | 0
(United States) **A Frazier** | 3 | **6** | **6**
Q | (Chinese Taipei) J Lee | **6** | 2 | 3
(United States) **C Morariu** | **6** | 3 | **6**
Q | (United States) J Capriati | 4 | **6** | 4
6 | (South Africa) **J Kruger** | 1 | **6** | **6**
WC | (United States) L Osterloh | **6** | 2 | 4
(Japan) M Saeki | 6 | **6** | 3
(France) **A-G Sidot** | **7** | 2 | **6**
(France) N Dechy | **6** | 4 | 3
(China) **F Li** | 4 | **6** | **6**

Second round
7 | (Russia) **E Likhovtseva** | **6** | **6**
(United States) A Frazier | 1 | 4
(United States) C Morariu | **6** | 1 | 0
3 | (United States) **V Williams** | 4 | **6** | **6**
6 | (South Africa) J Kruger | 3 | 6
(France) **A-G Sidot** | **6** | **7**
(China) F Li | **6** | 3 | 1
2 | (United States) **M Seles** | 2 | **6** | **6**

Quarterfinals
7 | (Russia) E Likhovtseva | 2 | 4
3 | (United States) **V Williams** | **6** | **6**
(France) A-G Sidot | 3 | 1
2 | (United States) **M Seles** | **6** | **6**

Semifinals
3 | (United States) **V Williams** | **6** | **6**
2 | (United States) M Seles | 3 | 4
