= 1995 Bank of the West Classic =

- Date: October 30 – November 5
- Edition: 24th
- Category: Tier II
- Draw: 28S / 14D
- Prize money: $430,000
- Surface: Carpet / indoor
- Location: Oakland, California, U.S.
- Venue: Oakland Alameda Coliseum

Champions

Singles
- (Bulgaria) Magdalena Maleeva

Doubles
- (United States) Lori McNeil / (Czech Republic) Helena Suková
- Stanford Classic

The 1995 Bank of the West Classic was a women's tennis tournament played on indoor carpet courts at the Oakland Alameda Coliseum in Oakland, California in the United States that was part of the Tier II category of the 1995 WTA Tour. It was the 24th edition of the tournament and was held from October 30 through November 5, 1995. Second-seeded Magdalena Maleeva won the singles title.

== Finals ==
=== Singles ===
(Bulgaria) Magdalena Maleeva defeated (Japan) Ai Sugiyama 6–3, 6–4

- It was Maleeva's 3rd singles title of the year and the 6th of her career.

=== Doubles ===
(United States) Lori McNeil / (Czech Republic) Helena Suková defeated (United States) Katrina Adams / (United States) Zina Garrison-Jackson 3–6, 6–4, 6–3
