= Ania Bleszynski Jayich =

American physicist and researcher

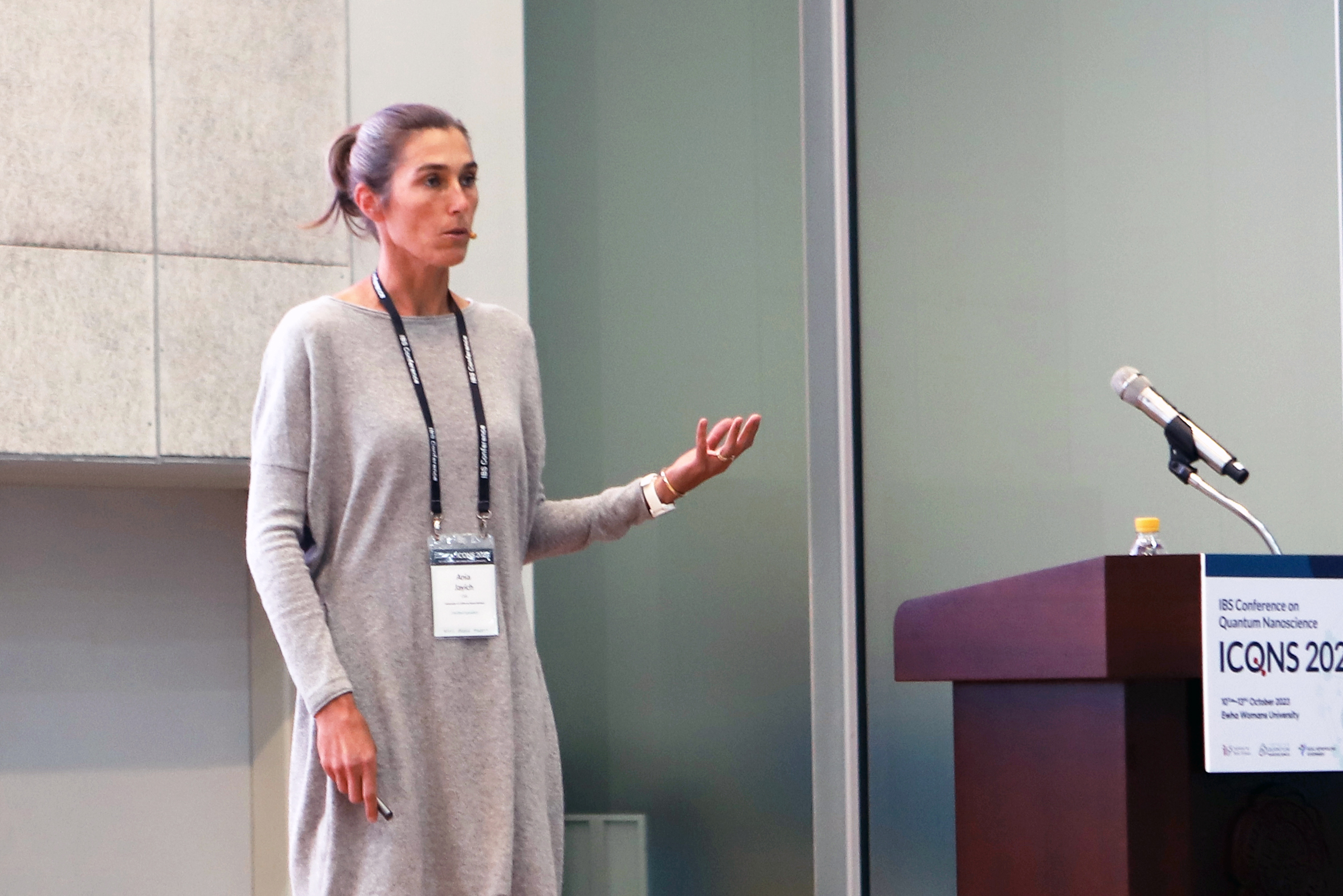
- Education: Stanford University; Harvard University
- Known for: Precision measurement; Novel sensors and applications; Hybrid quantum systems
- Awards: NSF CAREER Award; Presidential Early Career Award for Scientists and Engineers; Air Force Office of Scientific Research Young Investigator Award; L’Oreal Postdoctoral Fellowship for Women in Science
- Scientific career
- Fields: Condensed matter; Magnetometers; Quantum optics; Optomechanics; Nitrogen-vacancy center
- Workplaces: University of California, Santa Barbara
- Doctoral advisor: Robert M. Westervelt

Ania Bleszynski Jayich is an American experimental physicist most known for developing novel sensing techniques that shed light on biological, condensed matter, and quantum mechanical systems. Bleszynski Jayich is the Bruker Endowed Chair in Science and Engineering in the Department of Physics at the University of California, Santa Barbara and Associate Director of the campus's Materials Research Lab.

== Biography ==
Bleszynski Jayich was raised in Thousand Oaks, California. As the daughter of two physicists, she decided at an early age to dedicate her life to the subject as well. Bleszynski Jayich was also an elite tennis player growing up; she held the rank of No. 1 singles tennis in the United States for athletes 18-and-under. Bleszynski Jayich attended Stanford University and received a B.S. with honors in 2000 as a double major in mathematics and computational science, and physics. There, she conducted research in a collaboration with Stanford, NASA, and the Lockheed Corporation. Steven Chu supervised her undergraduate thesis at Stanford, which was recognized with an award for best honors thesis in physics. At the time, Bleszynski Jayich explained her interest: “I love the problem-solving process. The more you learn, the more of these things you can use as tools in the learning process.” At Stanford, Bleszynski Jayich was named most outstanding sophomore athlete and selected as an NCAA All-American for four years.

Bleszynski Jayich pursued her graduate studies in physics at Harvard under the supervision of Robert Westervelt. Her PhD thesis, on the topic "Imaging Electrons in Nanoscale Structures" (2006), applied scanning probe techniques to illuminate the structure of quantum dots in nanowires. Afterwards, as a postdoctoral researcher at Yale University, Bleszynski Jayich worked with Jack Harris to perform the first measurements of a counter-intuitive quantum mechanical effect in which rings of normal metal conductors are expected to support persistent currents. Her work, which was recognized in 2008 with a L'Oréal-UNESCO For Women in Science Award, identified the minuscule magnetic fields these currents produce by using ultra-sensitive cantilever beams. Next, she expanded her postdoctoral collaboration to include Mikhail Lukin of Harvard to couple nitrogen-vacancy centers in diamond to nanomechanical resonators.

In 2010, Bleszynski Jayich joined the physics faculty of University of California, Santa Barbara. The Jayich Lab is the Quantum Sensing and Imaging Group at UCSB, specializing in quantum effects on the nanoscale. Of particular interest to the Jayich Lab is the nanoscale imaging of spin and charge in condensed matter systems. These experiments have applications in quantum and classical computing and biology. Bleszynski Jayich is a principal investigator of the first National Science Foundation Quantum Foundry, based at UCSB. The UC Santa Barbara NSF Quantum Foundry is a major initiative (20 faculty, $25M) seeking to develop new materials with quantum applications.

== Honors and awards ==
- NSF CAREER Award, 2014
- Presidential Early Career Award for Scientists and Engineers (PECASE), 2012
- Air Force Office of Scientific Research Young Investigator Award, 2010
- L’Oreal Postdoctoral Fellowship for Women in Science (2008)
