= Nature Physics =

- Discipline: Pure and Applied physics
- Language: English
- Edited by: David Abergel

Publication details
- History: 2005–present
- Publisher: Nature Portfolio (United Kingdom)
- Frequency: Monthly
- Open access: Hybrid
- Impact factor: 18.0 (2025)

Standard abbreviations
- ISO 4: Nat. Phys.

Indexing
- CODEN: NPAHAX
- ISSN: 1745-2473 (print); 1745-2481 (web)
- LCCN: 2006208901
- OCLC no.: 61856917

Links
- Journal homepage; Online archive

Nature Physics is a monthly peer-reviewed scientific journal published by Nature Portfolio. The first issue was in October 2005. The chief editor is David Abergel.

== Scope ==
Nature Physics publishes both pure and applied research from all areas of physics. Subject areas covered by the journal include quantum mechanics, condensed-matter physics, optics, thermodynamics, particle physics, and biophysics.

== Abstracting and indexing ==
The journal is indexed in the following databases:

- Chemical Abstracts Service – CASSI
- Science Citation Index
- Science Citation Index Expanded
- Current Contents – Physical, Chemical & Earth Sciences

According to the Journal Citation Reports, the journal has a 2025 impact factor of 18.0, ranking it fourth out of 86 journals in the category "Physics, Multidisciplinary".
