= South American Games =

Multi-sport athletic event in South America

- 1978; 1982; 1986; 1990; 1994; 1998; 2002; 2006; 2010; 2014; 2018; 2022
- Athletics; Field hockey; Football; Futsal; Gymnastics; Handball; Softball; Tennis

South American Games
- Abbreviation: JJSS
- Purpose: Multi-sport event for South America
- Frequency: Every four years
- Inaugurated: 1978 in La Paz, Bolivia
- Most recent: 2026 in Santa Fe Province, Argentina
- Next event: 2030 in Biobío Region, Chile
- Website: odesur.org

The South American Games (also known as ODESUR Games; Spanish: Juegos Suramericanos; Portuguese: Jogos Sul-Americanos), formerly the Southern Cross Games (Spanish: Juegos Cruz del Sur) is a regional multi-sport event held between nations from South America, organized by the ODESUR (acronym for "Organización Deportiva Suramericana" – South American Sports Organization).

The first Games were held in 1978 in La Paz, Bolivia. They have since been held every four years, with the most recent edition in 2026 in Santa Fe Province, Argentina. The Games have had an equivalent to the Olympic Flame since their inception: the South American Flame, which is relayed from Tiahuanaco, Bolivia, to the host city.

For the XI edition in 2018 there were two bids: Cochabamba, Bolivia, and Barquisimeto, Venezuela, with the final hosting decision in favour of Cochabamba in 2011. Starting with the 2014 edition, the South American Para Games are held for South American Paralympic athletes. Just like the Olympic Games, the host city for the South American Games is also the host for Para-South American Games.

The detailed history of the South American Games together with an extensive list of medal winners was published in a book written (in Spanish) by Argentine journalist Ernesto Rodríguez III with support of the Argentine Olympic Committee under the auspices of the Ministry of Education in collaboration with the Sports Secretary of Argentina.

== Participants ==
15 ODESUR members along to the code COI of each one

- Argentina (ARG)
- Aruba (ARU)
- Bolivia (BOL)
- Brazil (BRA)
- Chile (CHL)
- Colombia (COL)
- Curaçao (CUW) (Note: Full ODESUR member but not an International Olympic Committee member)
- Ecuador (ECU)
- Guyana (GUY)
- Panama (PAN)
- Paraguay (PAR)
- Peru (PER)
- Suriname (SUR)
- Uruguay (URU)
- Venezuela (VEN)

== Games ==
| Year | Games | Host City | Host Country | Opened by | Dates | Athletes | Nations | Sports | Top medalling nation |
|---|---|---|---|---|---|---|---|---|---|
| 1978 | 1 | La Paz | Bolivia | Juan Pereda | 3 – 12 November | 480 | 8 | 16 | Argentina |
| 1982 | 2 | Rosario | Argentina | Reynaldo Bignone | 26 November – 5 December | 961 | 10 | 19 | Argentina |
| 1986 | 3 | Santiago | Chile | Augusto Pinochet | 28 November – 8 December | 969 | 10 | 17 | Argentina |
| 1990 | 4 | Lima | Peru | Alberto Fujimori | 1 – 10 December | 1,070 | 10 | 16 | Argentina |
| 1994 | 5 | Valencia | Venezuela | Rafael Caldera | 19 – 28 November | 1,599 | 14 | 19 | Argentina |
| 1998 | 6 | Cuenca | Ecuador | Gustavo Noboa | 21 – 31 October | 1,525 | 14 | 24 | Argentina |
| 2002 | 7 | Belém, Curitiba, Rio de Janeiro and São Paulo | Brazil | No official opening ceremony (Note: Each host city held their own opening ceremony and the Games were opened by different authorities: Almir Gabriel (Belém), Cássio Taniguchi (Curitiba), César Maia (Rio de Janeiro) and Marta Suplicy (São Paulo).) | 1 – 11 August | 2,069 | 13 | 24 | Brazil |
| 2006 | 8 | Buenos Aires | Argentina | Daniel Scioli | 9 – 19 November | 2,938 | 15 | 28 | Argentina |
| 2010 | 9 | Medellín | Colombia | Álvaro Uribe | 19 – 30 March | 3,751 | 15 | 31 | Colombia |
| 2014 | 10 | Santiago | Chile | Sebastián Piñera | 7 – 18 March | 3,499 | 14 | 33 | Brazil |
| 2018 | 11 | Cochabamba | Bolivia | Evo Morales | 26 May – 8 June | 4,010 | 14 | 35 | Colombia |
| 2022 | 12 | Asunción | Paraguay | Diego Galeano | 1 – 15 October | 4,476 | 15 | 34 | Brazil |
| 2026 | 13 | Rosario, Santa Fe, and Rafaela | Argentina | Maximiliano Pullaro | 12 – 26 September | 5,000 | 15 | 43 | Brazil |
| 2030 | 14 | Biobío | Chile | | | | | | |

== Para Games ==
| Year | Games | Host City | Host Country | Opened by | Dates | Athletes | Nations | Sports | Top medalling nation |
|---|---|---|---|---|---|---|---|---|---|
| 2014 | 1 | Santiago | Chile | Michelle Bachelet | 26 – 30 March | 600+ | 8 | 7 | Argentina |
| 2018 | – | Cochabamba | Bolivia | Cancelled | | | | | |
| 2026 | 2 | Valledupar | Colombia | Gustavo Petro | 5 – 15 July | 1064 | 11 | 13 | Brazil |

== Youth Games ==
| Year | Games | Host City | Host Country | Opened by | Dates | Athletes | Nations | Sports | Events | Top medalling nation |
|---|---|---|---|---|---|---|---|---|---|---|
| 2013 | 1 | Lima | Peru | Ollanta Humala | 20 – 29 September | 1,200 | 14 | 19 | 178 | Brazil |
| 2017 | 2 | Santiago | Chile | Michelle Bachelet | 29 September – 8 October | 1,279 | 14 | 20 | 210 | Brazil |
| 2022 | 3 | Rosario | Argentina | Omar Perotti | 28 April – 8 May | 2,500 | 15 | 26 | 205 | Brazil |
| 2026 | 4 | Panama City | Panama | José Raúl Mulino | 12 April – 25 April | 2,000 | 15 | 24 | 211 | Brazil |

== Beach Games ==
| Year | Games | Host City | Host Country | Opened by | Dates | Athletes | Nations | Sports | Top medalling nation |
|---|---|---|---|---|---|---|---|---|---|
| 2009 | 1 | Punta del Este/Montevideo | Uruguay | | 3 – 13 December | | 12 | 9 | Brazil |
| 2011 | 2 | Manta | Ecuador | | 2 – 12 December | 675 | 13 | 10 | Brazil |
| 2014 | 3 | Vargas | Venezuela | Nicolás Maduro | 14 – 24 May | | 12 | 10 | Venezuela |
| 2017 | – | Pimentel | Peru | Cancelled | | | | | |
| 2019 | 4 | Rosario | Argentina | Mauricio Macri | 14 – 23 March | | 14 | 13 | Argentina |
| 2023 | 5 | Santa Marta | Colombia | Astrid Rodríguez | 14 – 21 July | 800 | 15 | 14 | Colombia |
| 2027 | 6 | Iquique | Chile | | 4 – 15 March | | | | |

== Masters Games ==
| Year | Games | Host City | Host Country | Opened by | Dates | Athletes | Nations | Sports | Top medalling nation |
|---|---|---|---|---|---|---|---|---|---|
| 2021 | – | Santiago | Chile | Cancelled | | | | | |

== School Games ==
The South American School Games have been held since 1991. 27th was held in Santiago, Chile.

== Medals (1978–2026) ==
The total medal count for all the Games until 2026 is tabulated below. This table is sorted by the number of gold medals earned by each country. The number of silver medals is taken into consideration next, and then the number of bronze medals.

South American Games medal count
| Rank | Nation | Gold | Silver | Bronze | Total |
|---|---|---|---|---|---|
| 1 | Argentina | 1021 | 913 | 927 | 2861 |
| 2 | Brazil | 995 | 807 | 720 | 2522 |
| 3 | Colombia | 651 | 562 | 560 | 1773 |
| 4 | Venezuela | 614 | 555 | 612 | 1781 |
| 5 | Chile | 441 | 545 | 665 | 1651 |
| 6 | Peru | 237 | 321 | 438 | 996 |
| 7 | Ecuador | 229 | 292 | 442 | 963 |
| 8 | Uruguay | 93 | 143 | 187 | 423 |
| 9 | Bolivia | 38 | 89 | 166 | 293 |
| 10 | Paraguay | 36 | 79 | 94 | 209 |
| 11 | Panama | 21 | 22 | 45 | 88 |
| 12 | Suriname | 9 | 3 | 12 | 24 |
| 13 | Netherlands Antilles | 7 | 7 | 17 | 31 |
| 14 | Aruba | 3 | 10 | 15 | 28 |
| 15 | Guyana | 2 | 5 | 19 | 26 |
| 16 | Curaçao | 1 | 1 | 1 | 3 |
| Total | | 4398 | 4355 | 4926 | 13679 |

== Sports ==
Disciplines from the same sport are grouped under the same color:

Aquatics – Cycling – Football – Gymnastics – Roller sports – Volleyball

| Sport (discipline) | Body | | 78 | 82 | 86 | 90 | 94 | 98 | 02 | 06 | 10 | 14 | 18 | 22 |
| Sport (discipline) | World | South America | 78 | 82 | 86 | 90 | 94 | 98 | 02 | 06 | 10 | 14 | 18 | 22 |
|---|---|---|---|---|---|---|---|---|---|---|---|---|---|---|
| Diving | AQUA | ASUA | X | X | | | | | | | X | X | X | X |
| Open water swimming | AQUA | ASUA | | | | | | | | X | X | X | X | X |
| Swimming | AQUA | ASUA | X | X | | X | X | X | X | X | X | X | X | X |
| Synchronized swimming | AQUA | ASUA | | X | | | | | X | | X | X | X | X |
| Water polo | AQUA | ASUA | | | | | | | | | X | | X | X |
| Archery | WA | AAF | | | X | | | | X | X | X | X | X | X |
| Athletics | World Athletics | CONSUDATLE | X | X | X | X | X | X | X | X | X | X | X | X |
| Badminton | BWF | BPA | | | | | | | | X | X | | X | X |
| Baseball | WBSC | WBSC Americas | X | X | | X | X | | | | X | | | |
| Softball | WBSC | WBSC Americas | | | | | X | | X | | X | | | |
| Basketball | FIBA | ABASU | X | X | | | | | | X | X | X | X | X |
| Basque pelota | FIPV | | | | | | | | | | | | X | |
| Bocce | WPBF | | | | | | | | | X | | | | X |
| Bodybuilding | IFBB | IFBBSud America | | | | | | X | | | | | | X |
| Bowling | IBF | PABCON | | | X | X | X | X | X | X | X | X | X | X |
| Boxing | World Boxing | AMBC | X | X | X | X | X | X | X | X | X | X | X | X |
| Canoeing | ICF | COPAC | | | | | X | X | X | X | X | X | X | X |
| BMX racing | UCI | COPACI | | | | | | | | X | X | X | X | X |
| Mountain biking | UCI | COPACI | | | | | | X | X | X | X | X | X | X |
| Road cycling | UCI | COPACI | X | X | X | X | X | X | X | X | X | X | X | X |
| Track cycling | UCI | COPACI | X | X | | X | X | X | X | X | X | X | X | X |
| Equestrian | FEI | PAEC | X | X | | | | | | X | X | X | X | X |
| Fencing | FIE | CPE | X | X | X | X | X | X | X | X | X | X | X | X |
| Field hockey | FIH | PAHF | | | | | | | | X | | X | X | X |
| Football | FIFA | CONMEBOL | X | X | X | | X | | | | X | X | X | X |
| Futsal | FIFA | CONMEBOL | | | | | | X | X | X | X | X | X | X |
| Beach soccer | FIFA | CONMEBOL | | | | | | | | | | | | X |
| Golf | IGF | FSG | | | | | | | X | | | X | X | X |
| Artistic gymnastics | World Gymnastics | CONSUGI | X | X | X | X | X | X | X | X | X | X | X | X |
| Rhythmic gymnastics | World Gymnastics | CONSUGI | | | | X | X | X | X | X | X | X | X | X |
| Trampoline | World Gymnastics | CONSUGI | | | | | | | | | | | X | X |
| Handball | IHF | PATHF | | | | | | | X | X | X | X | X | X |
| Judo | IJF | PJC | X | X | X | X | X | X | X | X | X | X | X | X |
| Karate | WKF | PKF | | | | | X | X | X | X | X | X | X | X |
| Modern pentathlon | UIPM | | | | | | | | | | | X | X | |
| Racquetball | IRF | PARC | | | | | | X | | | | | X | |
| Artistic roller skating | WS | CPRS | | X | | | | X | X | X | X | X | X | X |
| Roller hockey | WS | CPRS | | X | | | | | | | | X | | |
| Roller speed skating | WS | CPRS | | X | | | | X | X | X | X | X | X | |
| Rowing | World Rowing | | | X | X | | | | X | X | X | X | X | X |
| Rugby sevens | WR | SAR | | | | | | | | | | X | X | X |
| Sailing | World Sailing | SASC | | X | X | X | | X | X | X | X | X | X | X |
| Scuba diving | | | | | X | | | | | | | | | |
| Shooting | ISSF | CAT | X | X | X | X | X | X | X | X | X | X | X | X |
| Squash | World Squash | FPS | | | | | | | | | X | | X | X |
| Table tennis | ITTF | LATTU | | X | | X | X | X | X | X | X | X | X | X |
| Taekwondo | World Taekwondo | PATU | | | X | X | X | X | X | X | X | X | X | X |
| Tennis | ITF | COSAT | X | X | X | X | X | X | X | X | X | X | X | X |
| Triathlon | TRI | PATCO | | | | | | X | X | X | X | X | X | X |
| Beach volleyball | FIVB | CSV | | | | | | | | | X | X | X | X |
| Indoor volleyball | FIVB | CSV | X | X | | | | | | | X | X | X | X |
| Water skiing | IWWF | IWWF Pan Am | | | | | | | | X | X | X | X | X |
| Weightlifting | IWF | PAWC | X | X | X | X | X | X | X | X | X | X | X | X |
| Wrestling | UWW | CPLA | X | X | X | X | X | X | X | X | X | X | X | X |
| Total events | | | 171 | 249 | 193 | 260 | 296 | 357 | 380 | 463 | 486 | 317 | 373 | |

== See also ==
- Ibero American Games
- Pan American Games
- Parapan American Games
- Central American and Caribbean Games
- Central American Games
- Bolivarian Games
- South American Masters Games
- Pan American Masters Games
- South American University Games
- World Indigenous Games
- Indigenous Peoples' Games
- ALBA Games
- CARIFTA Games
