= Isidro Ibarrondo =

Argentine gymnast (born 1970)

- Born: 21 December 1970 (age 55)

Gymnastics career
- Discipline: Men's artistic gymnastics
- Country represented: Argentina
Medal record
Men's artistic gymnastics
Representing Argentina
South American Games
Gold medal – first place	1994 Valencia	Team
Gold medal – first place	1994 Valencia	All-around
Gold medal – first place	1994 Valencia	Parallel bars
Gold medal – first place	1994 Valencia	Horizontal bar
Silver medal – second place	1994 Valencia	Pommel horse
Silver medal – second place	1994 Valencia	Rings

Isidro Ibarrondo (born 21 December 1970) is an Argentine gymnast. He competed in seven events at the 1992 Summer Olympics.
