= Softball at the South American Games =

Softball has been a South American Games event since 1994 in Valencia, Venezuela.

== Women ==
=== Summary ===
Year	Host	Final		Semifinalists	
Year	Host	Champions	Runners-up	3rd place	4th place
1994	(Venezuela); Valencia	?	?	?	?
2002	(Brazil); São Paulo	Netherlands Antilles	Brazil	Panama	Argentina
2010	(Colombia); Medellín	Venezuela	Colombia	Argentina	Peru
2026	(Argentina); Paraná	Venezuela	Brazil	Argentina	Peru

=== Medal table ===
Rank	Nation	Gold	Silver	Bronze	Total
1	Venezuela	2	0	0	2
2	Netherlands Antilles	1	0	0	1
3	Brazil	0	2	0	2
4	Colombia	0	1	0	1
5	Argentina	0	0	2	2
6	Panama	0	0	1	1
Totals (6 entries)		3	3	3	9

=== Participating nations ===
Nation	(Brazil) 2002	(Colombia) 2010	(Argentina) 2026	Years
Argentina	4th	3rd	3rd	3
Bolivia	-	-	6th	1
Brazil	2nd	-	2nd	2
Colombia	-	2nd	5th	2
Netherlands Antilles	1st	-	-	1
Panama	3rd	-	-	1
Peru	-	4th	4th	2
Venezuela	-	1st	1st	2
Total	4	4	6	

== Men ==
=== Summary ===
Year	Host	Final		Semifinalists	
Year	Host	Champions	Runners-up	3rd place	4th place
2026	(Argentina); Paraná	Venezuela	Argentina	Peru	Bolivia

=== Medal table ===
Rank	Nation	Gold	Silver	Bronze	Total
1	Venezuela	1	0	0	1
2	Argentina	0	1	0	1
3	Peru	0	0	1	1
Totals (3 entries)		1	1	1	3

=== Participating nations ===
Nation	(Argentina) 2026	Years
Argentina	2nd	1
Bolivia	4th	1
Peru	3rd	1
Venezuela	1st	1
Total	4	
