= Gonzalo Tellechea =

Argentine triathlete (born 1985)

Personal information
- Born: 11 July 1985 (age 40) San Juan, Argentina

Sport
- Sport: Triathlon
Medal record
Representing Argentina
South American Games
Gold medal – first place	2014 Santiago	Individual
Silver medal – second place	2010 Medellin	Team Olympic distance
Silver medal – second place	2010 Medellin	Team sprint
Bronze medal – third place	2014 Santiago	Mixed relay

Gonzalo Tellechea (born 11 July 1985) is an Argentine triathlete. At the 2012 Summer Olympics men's triathlon, he placed 38th.
