= Yeny Contreras =

Chilean taekwondo practitioner

Personal information
- Born: 2 August 1979 (age 46) Coronel, Chile

Sport
- Sport: Taekwondo
Medal record
Representing Chile
Pan American Games
Bronze medal – third place	2011 Guadalajara	57 kg
South American Games
Gold medal – first place	2010 Medellín	53 kg

Yeny Contreras Loyola (born August 2, 1979) is a Chilean taekwondo practitioner. At the 2012 Summer Olympics, she competed in the Women's 57kg Taekwondo event, but was defeated in the first round.
