= Triathlon at the 2011 Pan American Games – Qualification =

There will be a quota of 70 athletes (40 men and 30 women). Each NOC is allowed to enter a maximum of 3 men and 3 women. The hosts Mexico is guaranteed 6 spots, either through qualifying or through a guaranteed host nation place. An athlete does not qualify through this system, rather he/she qualifies a spot for their nation, an athlete may not qualify more than 1 quota spot.

== Qualification summary ==
NOC	Men	Women	Total
Argentina	3	2	5
Barbados	1		1
Bermuda	1	1	2
Bolivia	1		1
Brazil	3	3	6
Canada	2	1	3
Chile	3	3	6
Colombia	2	2	4
Costa Rica	2	1	3
Cuba	2	1	3
Ecuador	2	2	4
El Salvador	1		1
Guatemala	2	1	3
Mexico	3	3	6
Nicaragua	1		1
Panama	1		1
Paraguay		1	1
Puerto Rico	1	2	3
United States	3	3	6
Uruguay	1	1	2
Venezuela	3	1	4
Virgin Islands	1		1
Total athletes	39	28	65
Total NOCs	21	13	22

== Men ==
The following is a list of qualified athletes:

Event	Location	Vacancies	Qualified
2010 Central American and Caribbean Games	(Puerto Rico) Mayagüez	2	Mexico; Mexico
2010 South American Games	(Colombia) Medellín	1	Brazil; ~~Colombia~~
2011 South American Triathlon Championship	(Ecuador) Salinas	1	Brazil
2011 Central American and Caribbean Triathlon Championship	(Colombia) Guatape	1	Colombia
ITU Ranking list on June 30, 2011 Positions 1-55.		6	United States; United States; Costa Rica; Brazil; United States; Canada
ITU Ranking completed by PATCO ranking		4	Argentina; Canada; Chile; Mexico
PATCO Ranking list on June 30, 2011 Positions 1-125		15	Colombia; Barbados; Argentina; Cuba; Argentina; Guatemala; Chile; Puerto Rico; ~~Canada~~; Guatemala; Chile; ~~Costa Rica~~^{2} Venezuela; Panama; Costa Rica; Venezuela; Cuba
Host Nation spots^{1}		3	Venezuela; El Salvador; Uruguay
Invitational		6	Bermuda; Virgin Islands; Bolivia; Ecuador; Ecuador; Nicaragua
TOTAL		39	

^1 Mexico qualified athletes through other routes, so its automatic spots have been given to other countries.
^2 Countries that are marked with a strike have withdrawn and there quota spot put in the wildcard pool.

== Women ==
The following is a list of qualified athletes:

Event	Location	Vacancies	Qualified
2010 Central American and Caribbean Games	(Puerto Rico) Mayagüez	2	Mexico; Bermuda
2010 South American Games	(Colombia) Medellín	1	Chile; ~~Colombia~~
2011 South American Triathlon Championship	(Ecuador) Salinas	1	Brazil
2011 Central American and Caribbean Triathlon Championship	(Colombia) Guatape	1	Cuba
ITU Ranking list on June 30, 2011 Positions 1-55.		4	~~Canada~~; United States; United States; United States; ~~Canada~~; Canada
ITU Ranking completed by PATCO ranking		1	Argentina
PATCO Ranking list on June 30, 2011 Positions 1-125		10	Chile; Colombia; Brazil; Ecuador; Mexico; Brazil; Colombia; Costa Rica; Puerto Rico; Mexico
Host Nation spots^{1}		3	Puerto Rico; Ecuador; Chile
Invitational		5	Argentina; Venezuela; Guatemala; Paraguay; Uruguay
TOTAL		28	

^1 Mexico qualified athletes through other routes, so its automatic spots have been given to other countries.
