= 2022 South American Games =

Multi-sport event in Asunción, Paraguay

XII South American Games
- Host city: Asunción
- Country: Paraguay
- Nations: 15
- Athletes: 4,476
- Events: 404 in 34 sports (56 disciplines); 8 in 2 demonstration sports
- Opening: 1 October 2022
- Closing: 15 October 2022
- Opened by: Diego Galeano
- Main venue: Estadio Defensores del Chaco

The XII South American Games (Spanish: XII Juegos Suramericanos Asunción 2022) was a multi-sport event held between 1–15 October 2022 in Asunción, Paraguay. The Games were organized by the South American Sports Organization, the Paraguayan Olympic Committee, the government of the Republic of Paraguay and the local National Secretary of Sports.

== Bidding process ==
The city of Asunción, capital of Paraguay, announced its interest in hosting the 2022 South American Games. In September 2017, Camilo Pérez López Moreira, president of the Paraguayan Olympic Committee, reported that he had the endorsement of then-President Horacio Cartes to be able to present the Asunción 2022 candidacy. According to López, an investment of USD 25 million was required. Meanwhile, it was speculated that the Argentine city of Rosario would also present its candidacy.

Asunción was finally the only city that officially presented its candidacy for the 2022 South American Games before the nominations deadline, on 17 November 2019. At the Odesur assembly on 11 December 2017, it was unanimously designated as the host city. Rosario, meanwhile, was assigned as the venue for the 2021 South American Youth Games (now the 2022 South American Youth Games).

Among the venues that were designed for the event were the Paraguayan Olympic Park, the Sportivo Luqueño Club (both located in Luque), the bay of Asunción and Rakiura, while the South American Village was built in the city of Mariano Roque Alonso in an area of 17.5 hectares (although it was initially indicated that it would be in Costanera Norte).

However, the local National Secretary of Sports (SND) announced on 27 July 2019 that the country was renouncing the organization of the event. The reason given by the government was that the resources committed in the Games were destined to the construction of a new hospital in Barrio Obrero and other health projects.

On 8 October, the president of Odesur and also of the Paraguayan Olympic Committee, Camilo Pérez, announced that Asunción will finally organize this edition of the South American Games.

== Budget ==
The capital budget of the games was cut to 180 million USD, due to budget cuts by the government. This amount was further reduced to 80 million USD.

== Participating nations ==
The number of athletes entered by a NOC is in parentheses, Curaçao debuted on the games for the first time.

- Argentina (592)
- Aruba (12)
- Bolivia (296)
- Brazil (464)
- Chile (539)
- Colombia (500)
- Curaçao (27) (Debut)
- Ecuador (225)
- Guyana (16)
- Panama (86)
- Paraguay (576) (hosts)
- Peru (374)
- Suriname (27)
- Uruguay (322)
- Venezuela (420)

== Sports ==
A total of 34 sports are scheduled to be contested, 29 of them are in the program of the 2023 Pan American Games scheduled for Santiago, Chile and will give nominal places for the event. The Organizing Committee chose as optional sports: bocce, bodybuilding, futsal and beach soccer. Along this 34 sports, they chose chess and padel are being contested as exhibition/demonstration sports.

Numbers in parentheses indicate the number of medal events to be contested in each sport/discipline.

- Aquatics
  - Artistic swimming (2)
  - Diving (8)
  - Open water swimming (2)
  - Swimming (42)
  - Water polo (2)
- Archery (10)
- Athletics (49)
- Badminton (6)
- Basketball
  - Basketball (2)
  - 3x3 basketball (2)
- Bocce (3)
- Bodybuilding (6)
- Bowling (4)
- Boxing (13)
- Canoeing
  - Canoe sprint (12)
  - Slalom canoeing (6)
- Chess (6)
- Cycling
  - BMX freestyle (2)
  - BMX racing (2)
  - Mountain biking (2)
  - Road cycling (4)
  - Track cycling (12)
- Equestrian
  - Dressage (2)
  - Jumping (2)
- Fencing (12)
- Field hockey (2)
- Football
  - Beach soccer (1)
  - Football (2)
  - Futsal (2)
- Golf (3)
- Gymnastics
  - Artistic gymnastics (14)
  - Rhythmic gymnastics (8)
  - Trampoline (2)
- Handball (2)
- Judo (15)
- Karate (12)
- Padel (2)
- Roller sports
  - Artistic roller skating (4)
  - Inline speed skating (10)
  - Skateboarding (2)
- Rowing (14)
- Rugby sevens (2)
- Sailing (7)
- Shooting (15)
- Squash (7)
- Table tennis (7)
- Taekwondo (12)
- Tennis (5)
- Triathlon (3)
- Volleyball
  - Beach volleyball (2)
  - Volleyball (2)
- Water skiing (10)
  - Water skiing (8)
  - Wakeboarding (2)
- Weightlifting (14)
- Wrestling
  - Freestyle wrestling (12)
  - Greco-Roman wrestling (6)

== Calendar ==
The schedule was as follows:

OC	Opening ceremony	●	Event competitions	1	Gold medal events	CC	Closing ceremony

Sports		October															Events
Sports		1st Sat	2nd Sun	3rd Mon	4th Tue	5th Wed	6th Thu	7th Fri	8th Sat	9th Sun	10th Mon	11th Tue	12th Wed	13th Thu	14th Fri	15th Sat	Events
Ceremonies		OC														CC	—N/a
Aquatics	Artistic swimming							●	1	1							2
Aquatics	Diving		2	2	2	2											8
Aquatics	Open water swimming											2					2
Aquatics	Swimming		12	12	10	8											42
Aquatics	Water polo											●	●	●	●	2	2
Archery			2	4	●	2											10
Athletics													8	13	17	11	49
Badminton			●	1	●	●	5										6
Basketball	Basketball					●	●	●	●	1		●	●	●	●	1	2
Basketball	3x3 basketball		●	2													2
Bocce													●	●	3		3
Bodybuilding			6														6
Bowling										●	2	●	2				4
Boxing									●	●	●	●	6	7			13
Canoeing	Canoe sprint											2	7	3			12
Canoeing	Canoe slalom												2	●	4		6
Chess (demonstration sport)									●	6							6
Cycling	BMX freestyle							●	2								2
Cycling	BMX racing													●	2		2
Cycling	Mountain biking		2														2
Cycling	Road cycling			2		2											4
Cycling	Track cycling												3	3	3	3	12
Equestrian			●	1		1			●	1		1					4
Fencing			2	2	2	2	2	2									12
Field hockey				●	●	●	●	●	●	●	●	1	1				2
Football	Beach soccer		●	●	●	●	1										1
Football	Football				●	●	●	●	●	●	●	1	1				2
Football	Futsal										●	●	●	●	2		2
Golf						●	●	●	3								3
Gymnastics	Artistic gymnastics					2	2	5	5								14
Gymnastics	Rhythmic gymnastics											2	3	3			8
Gymnastics	Trampoline												●	2			2
Handball							●	●	●	●	1	●	●	●	●	1	2
Judo												7	7	1			15
Karate				4	4	4											12
Padel (demonstration sport)							●	●	●	2							2
Roller sports	Artistic		●	4													4
Roller sports	Skateboarding	●	2														2
Roller sports	Speed		4	4	2												10
Rowing			●	5	5	4											14
Rugby sevens								●	●	2							2
Sailing			●	●	●	●	7										7
Shooting										●	5	1	2	3	4		15
Squash											●	●	2	3	●	2	7
Table tennis										●	1	2	2	●	2		7
Taekwondo						4	3	5									12
Tennis											●	●	●	●	3	2	5
Triathlon			2		1												3
Volleyball	Beach volleyball											●	●	●	●	2	2
Volleyball	Volleyball				●	●	●	●	1		●	●	●	●	1		2
Water skiing								●	6	4							10
Weightlifting			4	3	3	3											14
Wrestling													6	6	6		14
Daily medal events			38	46	29	37	15	17	18	9	9	19	52	44	47	24	404
Cumulative total			38	84	113	150	165	182	200	209	218	237	289	333	380	404	404
Sports		1st Sat	2nd Sun	3rd Mon	4th Tue	5th Wed	6th Thu	7th Fri	8th Sat	9th Sun	10th Mon	11th Tue	12th Wed	13th Thu	14th Fri	15th Sat	Total events
Sports		October															Total events

== Medal table ==
* Host nation (Paraguay)

Rank	Nation	Gold	Silver	Bronze	Total
1	Brazil (BRA)	134	99	86	319
2	Colombia (COL)	79	78	98	255
3	Argentina (ARG)	56	65	75	196
4	Chile (CHI)	38	32	61	131
5	Venezuela (VEN)	31	43	57	131
6	Ecuador (ECU)	25	21	32	78
7	Peru (PER)	19	18	37	74
8	Paraguay (PAR)*	8	26	14	48
9	Uruguay (URU)	8	14	18	40
10	Aruba (ARU)	3	3	0	6
11	Panama (PAN)	3	1	8	12
12	Bolivia (BOL)	0	2	7	9
13	Guyana (GUY)	0	1	2	3
14	Curaçao (CUW)	0	1	0	1
Totals (14 entries)		404	404	495	1,303

== Venues ==
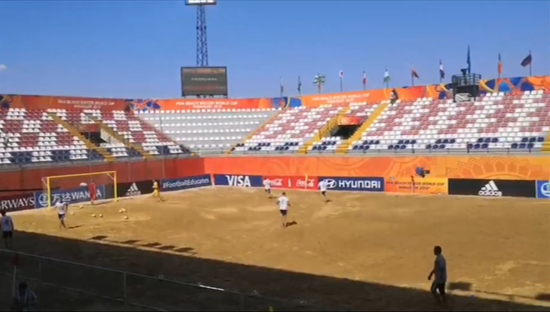
The Los Pynandi World Cup Stadium hosted two sports: beach soccer and beach volleyball.

These are some of the venues confirmed to host the games:

- Anfiteatro José Asunción Flores – Mountain biking.
- Asunción Golf Club – Golf.
- Bahía de Asunción – Canoeing; Road cycling; Rowing.
- Bloque 1 del SND – Weightlifting; Boxing.
- Bloque 2 del SND – Judo.
- Bloque 3 del SND – Karate; Wrestling; Taekwondo.
- Bochódromo del Parque Olímpico – Boules.
- Centro Nacional de Squash – Squash.
- Club Internacional de Tenis – Tenis.
- Estadio Héroes de Curupayty – Rugby.
- Federación Paraguaya de Tenis de Mesa – Table tennis; Fencing.
- Hotel Guaraní Asunción – Bodybuilding.
- Canal de Piracema – Canoe slalom
- Los Pynandi World Cup Stadium – Beach soccer; Beach volleyball.
- Pabellón de Gimnasia del SND – Artistic gymnastic; Rhythmic gymnastic; Trampoline gymnastic.
- Pista BMX – BMX freestyle; BMX racing.
- Pista de Atletismo del COP – Athletics.
- Polideportivo de las Fuerzas Armadas – TBA.
- Saltos del Monday – Canoe sprint.
- SND Arena – Artistic skating.
- Stand de Tiro del COP – Shooting.
- Strike Bowling – Bowling.
- Terminal Occidental – Open water swimming; Water skiing; Triathlon.
- Velódromo del COP – Track cycling.

== See also ==
- 2022 Winter Olympics
- 2022 Central American Games
- 2022 Asian Games
