= 1986 South American Games =

Multi-sport event in Santiago, Chile

III South American Games
- 1986 South American Games logo
- Host city: Santiago
- Country: Chile
- Nations: 11
- Athletes: 969
- Events: 193 in 17 sports
- Opening: November 28, 1986
- Closing: December 8, 1986
- Opened by: Arturo Álvarez
- Athlete's Oath: Juan Carlos Palma
- Judge's Oath: Luis Olmo de Aguilera
- Torch lighter: Omar Aguilar
- Main venue: Estadio Nacional de Chile

The III South American Games (Spanish: Juegos Sudamericanos; Portuguese: Jogos Sul-Americanos) were a multi-sport event held in 1986 in Santiago, Chile, with some events in Concepción and Viña del Mar. The Games were organized by the South American Sports Organization (ODESUR) and were initially awarded to Brazil at its 1982 congress held in Rosario. However, four months later, Brazil declined the offer. Therefore, Guayaquil and Quito in Ecuador were chosen, but due to lack of government support the games were finally moved to Santiago, Chile.

An appraisal of the games and detailed medal lists were published elsewhere, emphasizing the results of the Argentinian teams.

At the opening ceremony, on 29 November 1986, the games were inaugurated by Arturo Álvarez, General Director of Sports. The torch lighter at the Estadio Nacional de Chile was athlete Omar Aguilar.

Suriname had the first appearance at the games resulting in a total of 11 teams participating.

== Participants ==
11 ODESUR members participated on the Games and Suriname debuted on the games for the first time

- Argentina
- Bolivia
- Brazil
- Chile (Hosts)
- Colombia
- Ecuador
- Paraguay
- Peru
- Suriname (Debut)
- Venezuela
- Uruguay

== Medal count ==
The medal count for these South American Games is tabulated below. This table is sorted by the number of gold medals earned by each country. The number of silver medals is taken into consideration next, and then the number of bronze medals.

* Host nation (Chile)

Rank	Nation	Gold	Silver	Bronze	Total
1	Argentina (ARG)	80	44	45	169
2	Chile (CHI)*	50	66	60	176
3	Uruguay (URU)	17	15	12	44
4	Ecuador (ECU)	16	17	25	58
5	Brazil (BRA)	14	10	12	36
6	Peru (PER)	13	26	35	74
7	Bolivia (BOL)	2	2	6	10
8	Paraguay (PAR)	1	6	8	15
9	Venezuela (VEN)	0	1	1	2
10	Colombia (COL)	0	1	0	1
Totals (10 entries)		193	188	204	585

== Sports ==
Key sports swimming and track cycling were not held at this edition. On the other hand, medals were awarded in underwater sports (scuba diving) in categories "orientation" and "pursuit" addressing particularly military staff.

- Archery^{‡}
- Athletics
- Bowling^{*}
- Boxing
- Cycling
  - Road Cycling
- Fencing
- Football^{†}
- Gymnastics
  - Artistic gymnastics
- Judo
- Rowing
- Sailing
- Underwater sports
- Shooting
- Taekwondo
- Tennis^{†}
- Weightlifting
- Wrestling

=== Notes ===
^{†}: Competition reserved to junior representatives (U-20).

^{‡}: Archery is listed in the overview of the competitions held at the 1986 games. However, there are no medals for Archery in the medal lists.

^{*}: Bowling is declared as "exhibition event" in one source.
