= Padel at the 2022 South American Games =

- Venue: Canchas de Pádel
- Dates: October 6−9
- Nations: 7

Padel competitions at the 2022 South American Games in Asunción, Paraguay are scheduled to be held between October 8 and 9, 2022 at the Canchas de Pádel.

== Schedule ==
The competition schedule is as follows:

G	Group stage	1/2	Semi-finals	B	Bronze medal match	F	Gold medal match

Date Event	Thu 6	Fri 7	Sat 8	Sun 9		
Men's doubles	G	G	G	1/2	B	F
Women's doubles	G	G	G	1/2	B	F

== Medal summary ==
=== Medal table ===
* Host nation (Paraguay)

Rank	Nation	Gold	Silver	Bronze	Total
1	Argentina (ARG)	2	0	0	2
2	Brazil (BRA)	0	1	1	2
3	Chile (CHI)	0	1	0	1
4	Paraguay (PAR)*	0	0	1	1
Totals (4 entries)		2	2	2	6

=== Medalists ===
Event	Gold	Silver	Bronze
Men's doubles	Franco dal Bianco; Juan de Pascual; Argentina	Lucas da Cunha; Julio Julianotti; Brazil	Martín Abud; Pedro Castañeyra; Paraguay
Women's doubles	Cecilia Reiter; Daiara Valenzuela; Argentina	Giannina Minieri; Gabriela Roux; Chile	Alessandra de Barros; Fernanda Branchi; Brazil

== Participation ==
Seven nations will participate in padel of the 2022 South American Games.

- Argentina
- Brazil
- Chile
- Ecuador
- Paraguay
- Uruguay
- Venezuela

== Results ==
=== Men's doubles ===
Pool A

Rk	Athletes	W	L	DS
1	(Argentina) Franco Dal Bianco / Juan de Pascual	4	0	4
2	(Chile) Cristóbal Molina / Daniel Salinas	2	2	0
3	(Venezuela) Ruben Anzart / Sebastián Iglesias	0	4	-4

	Score	
(Venezuela) Ruben Anzart / Sebastián Iglesias	0–2	(Argentina) Franco Dal Bianco / Juan de Pascual
(Chile) Cristóbal Molina / Daniel Salinas	2–0	(Venezuela) Ruben Anzart / Sebastián Iglesias
(Argentina) Franco Dal Bianco / Juan de Pascual	2–0	(Chile) Cristóbal Molina / Daniel Salinas

Pool B

Rk	Athletes	W	L	DS
1	(Brazil) Julio Julianotti / Lucas Da Cunha	6	1	5
2	(Paraguay) Martin Abud / Pedro Castañeyra	5	3	2
3	(Uruguay) Diego Ramos / Higor Ensslin	3	4	-1
4	(Ecuador) Carlos Luna / Juan Paredes	0	5	-6

	Score	
(Brazil) Lucas Da Cunha / Julio Julianotti	2–1	(Paraguay) Martin Abud / Pedro Castañeyra
(Uruguay) Diego Ramos / Higor Ensslin	2–0	(Ecuador) Carlos Luna / Juan Paredes
(Ecuador) Carlos Luna / Juan Paredes	0–2	(Paraguay) Martin Abud / Pedro Castañeyra
(Uruguay) Diego Ramos / Higor Ensslin	0–2	(Brazil) Lucas Da Cunha / Julio Julianotti
(Brazil) Lucas Da Cunha / Julio Julianotti	2–0	(Ecuador) Carlos Luna / Juan Paredes
(Paraguay) Martin Abud / Pedro Castañeyra	2–1	(Uruguay) Diego Ramos / Higor Ensslin

Finals

Semifinals
(Paraguay) Martin Abud / Pedro Castañeyra	1
(Argentina) Franco Dal Bianco / Juan de Pascual	2
(Brazil) Lucas Da Cunha / Julio Julianotti	2
(Chile) Cristóbal Molina / Daniel Salinas	0

Final
(Argentina) Franco Dal Bianco / Juan de Pascual	2
(Brazil) Lucas Da Cunha (paddel) / Julio Julianotti	0
Bronze medal match
(Paraguay) Martin Abud / Pedro Castañeyra	2
(Chile) Cristóbal Molina / Daniel Salinas	0

=== Women's doubles ===
Pool A

Rk	Athletes	W	L	DS
1	(Argentina) Cecilia Reiter / Daiara Valenzuela	4	1	3
2	(Brazil) Alessandra De Barros / Fernanda Branchi	3	2	1
3	(Ecuador) Adriana Castillo / Ana Pérez	0	4	-4

	Score	
(Argentina) Cecilia Reiter / Daiara Valenzuela	2–1	(Brazil) Alessandra De Barros / Fernanda Branchi
(Ecuador) Adriana Castillo / Ana Pérez	0–2	(Argentina) Cecilia Reiter / Daiara Valenzuela
(Brazil) Alessandra De Barros / Fernanda Branchi	2–0	(Ecuador) Adriana Castillo / Ana Pérez

Pool B

Rk	Athletes	W	L	DS
1	(Chile) Gabriela Roux / Giannina Minieri	6	0	6
2	(Paraguay) Jesica Morales / Lorena Riquelme	4	2	2
3	(Uruguay) Camila De Lima / Claudia Fernández	2	4	-2
4	(Venezuela) María Gabriela Roche / Marian Piñate	0	6	-6

	Score	
(Uruguay) Camila De Lima / Claudia Fernández	0–2	(Chile) Gabriela Roux / Giannina Minieri
(Venezuela) María Gabriela Roche / Marian Piñate	0–2	(Paraguay) Jesica Morales / Lorena Riquelme
(Paraguay) Jesica Morales / Lorena Riquelme	0–2	(Chile) Gabriela Roux / Giannina Minieri
(Uruguay) Camila De Lima / Claudia Fernández	2–0	(Venezuela) María Gabriela Roche / Marian Piñate
(Paraguay) Jesica Morales / Lorena Riquelme	2–0	(Uruguay) Camila De Lima / Claudia Fernández
(Chile) Gabriela Roux / Giannina Minieri	2–0	(Venezuela) María Gabriela Roche / Marian Piñate

Finals

Semifinals
(Paraguay) Jesica Morales / Lorena Riquelme	0
(Argentina) Cecilia Reiter / Daiara Valenzuela	2
(Brazil) Alessandra De Barros / Fernanda Branchi	0
(Chile) Gabriela Roux / Giannina Minieri	2

Final
(Argentina) Cecilia Reiter / Daiara Valenzuela	2
(Chile) Gabriela Roux / Giannina Minieri	0
Bronze medal match
(Paraguay) Jesica Morales / Lorena Riquelme	0
(Brazil) Alessandra De Barros / Fernanda Branchi	2
