= Modern pentathlon at the 2019 Pan American Games – Qualification =

The following is the qualification system and qualified countries for the Modern pentathlon at the 2019 Pan American Games competitions.

== Qualification system ==
A total of 64 Modern pentathletes will qualify to compete. Each nation may enter a maximum of 6 athletes (three per gender). Quotas will be awarded across three qualification tournaments. The host nation, Peru, automatically qualifies the four athletes (two per gender). Each country competing at the 2018 South American Games and the 2018 Central American and Caribbean Games along with Canada and the USA qualified one athlete per individual event. The remaining quotas were awarded per second ranked athletes from countries at the 2018 Pan American Championships, and if necessary third ranked athletes.

== Qualification timeline ==
Event	Date	Venue
2018 South American Games	June 6–8, 2018	(Bolivia) Cochabamba
2018 Central American and Caribbean Games	July 20–23, 2018	(Colombia) Barranquilla
2018 Pan American Championships	December 3–6, 2018	(Peru) Lima

== Qualification summary ==
The following is the final allocation quota.

Nation	Men		Women		Mixed	Total
Nation	Individual	Relay	Individual	Relay	Relay	Athletes
Argentina	3	X	3	X	X	6
Bolivia	2	X	2	X	X	4
Brazil	2	X	3	X	X	5
Canada	2	X	3	X	X	5
Chile	2	X	1		X	3
Colombia	1		1		X	2
Cuba	2	X	3	X	X	5
Dominican Republic	2	X	2	X	X	4
Ecuador	2	X	2	X	X	4
Guatemala	2	X	3	X	X	5
Mexico	3	X	3	X	X	6
Panama	1					1
Peru	2	X	2	X	X	4
United States	2	X	3	X	X	5
Uruguay	2	X	1		X	3
Venezuela	2	X			X	2
Total: 16 NOCs	32	14	32	11	15	64

== Men ==
Competition	Vacancies	Qualified
Host nation	2	Peru; Peru
Automatic qualification	2	Canada; United States
2018 South American Games	8	Argentina; Brazil; Bolivia; Chile; Ecuador; Panama; Uruguay; Venezuela
2018 Central American and Caribbean Games	5	Colombia; Cuba; Dominican Republic; Guatemala; Mexico
2018 Pan American Championships; Second ranked	13	Argentina; Mexico; Guatemala; Cuba; Brazil; Chile; United States; Canada; Venezuela; Uruguay; Bolivia; Ecuador; Dominican Republic
2018 Pan American Championships; Third ranked	2	Argentina; Mexico
Total	32	

== Women ==
Competition	Vacancies	Qualified
Host nation	2	Peru; Peru
Automatic qualification	2	Canada; United States
2018 South American Games	5	Argentina; Brazil; Bolivia; Chile; Ecuador
2018 Central American and Caribbean Games	~~6~~ 5	Colombia; Cuba; Dominican Republic; Guatemala; Mexico; ~~Venezuela~~
2018 Pan American Championships; Second ranked	11	Mexico; Guatemala; Brazil; Argentina; Canada; United States; Cuba; Bolivia; Dominican Republic; Ecuador; Uruguay
2018 Pan American Championships; Third ranked	7	Guatemala; Brazil; Argentina; Mexico; United States; Canada; Cuba
Total	32	
