= 1978 Southern Cross Games =

Multi-sport event in La Paz, Bolivia

I Southern Cross Games
- Host city: La Paz
- Country: Bolivia
- Nations: 8
- Athletes: 480
- Events: 171 in 16 sports
- Opening: November 3, 1978
- Closing: November 12, 1978
- Opened by: Juan Pereda; President of Bolivia
- Athlete's Oath: Edgar Cueto
- Torch lighter: Roberto Prado
- Main venue: Estadio Olímpico Hernando Siles

The I Southern Cross Games (Spanish: Juegos Cruz del Sur) were a multi-sport event held from November 3 to November 12, 1978, in La Paz, Bolivia, with some events in Cochabamba and Santa Cruz de la Sierra.

La Paz already organized last year's Bolivarian Games and, with the necessary infrastructure already being present, hosted the majority of the events. Cochabamba hosted men's basketball, judo, tennis, and men's volleyball, and Santa Cruz de la Sierra, hosted equestrian, fencing, women's volleyball, and weightlifting.

This was the first edition of what would later be the South American Games, organized by the South American Sports Organization (ODESUR). An appraisal of the games and detailed medal lists were published elsewhere, emphasizing the results of the Argentinian teams. There is a further publication emphasizing on the Bolivian athletes.

The South American Torch was lit by Bolivian athletes Roberto Prado in La Paz, Isabel Alemán in Cochabamba, and José Ernesto Roca in Santa Cruz de la Sierra. The Athlete's Oath was sworn by cyclist Edgar Cueto in La Paz, by judoka Ladislao Moravek in Cochabamba, and by fencer Luís Darío Vásquez in Santa Cruz de la Sierra.

== Participants ==
8 ODESUR nations participated of the first games with 480 athletes

- Argentina
- Bolivia
- Brazil
- Chile
- Ecuador
- Paraguay
- Peru
- Uruguay

== Medal count ==
The medal count for these Games is tabulated below. This table is sorted by the number of gold medals earned by each country. The number of silver medals is taken into consideration next, and then the number of bronze medals.

* Host nation (Bolivia)

| Rank | Nation | Gold | Silver | Bronze | Total |
|---|---|---|---|---|---|
| 1 | Argentina (ARG) | 91 | 53 | 45 | 189 |
| 2 | Chile (CHI) | 31 | 25 | 20 | 76 |
| 3 | Bolivia (BOL)* | 20 | 42 | 44 | 106 |
| 4 | Ecuador (ECU) | 13 | 8 | 6 | 27 |
| 5 | Peru (PER) | 9 | 16 | 10 | 35 |
| 6 | Uruguay (URU) | 4 | 16 | 12 | 32 |
| 7 | Paraguay (PAR) | 2 | 3 | 4 | 9 |
| 8 | Brazil (BRA) | 1 | 0 | 0 | 1 |
| Totals (8 entries) | | 171 | 163 | 141 | 475 |

== Sports ==
A total number of 480 athletes competed for medals in sixteen sports:

- Aquatics
  - Swimming
- Athletics
- Baseball^{†}
- Basketball
- Boxing
- Cycling
  - Road Cycling
  - Track Cycling
- Equestrian
- Fencing
- Football
- Gymnastics
  - Artistic gymnastics
- Judo
- Shooting
- Tennis
- Volleyball
- Weightlifting
- Wrestling

Note:^{†} One source only references 15 events with no indication for baseball in the medal lists.
