= 2030 South American Games =

Multi-sport event in Biobío Region, Chile

XIV South American Games
- Host city: Biobío Region
- Country: Chile
- Nations: 15
- Athletes: Approx. 7,000
- Events: 34 sports

The XIV South American Games (Spanish: XIV Juegos Suramericanos Biobío 2030) will be a multi-sport event to be held during 2030 in Biobío Region, Chile. The Games will be organized by the South American Sports Organization, the Chilean Olympic Committee and the Chilean government.

== Venues ==
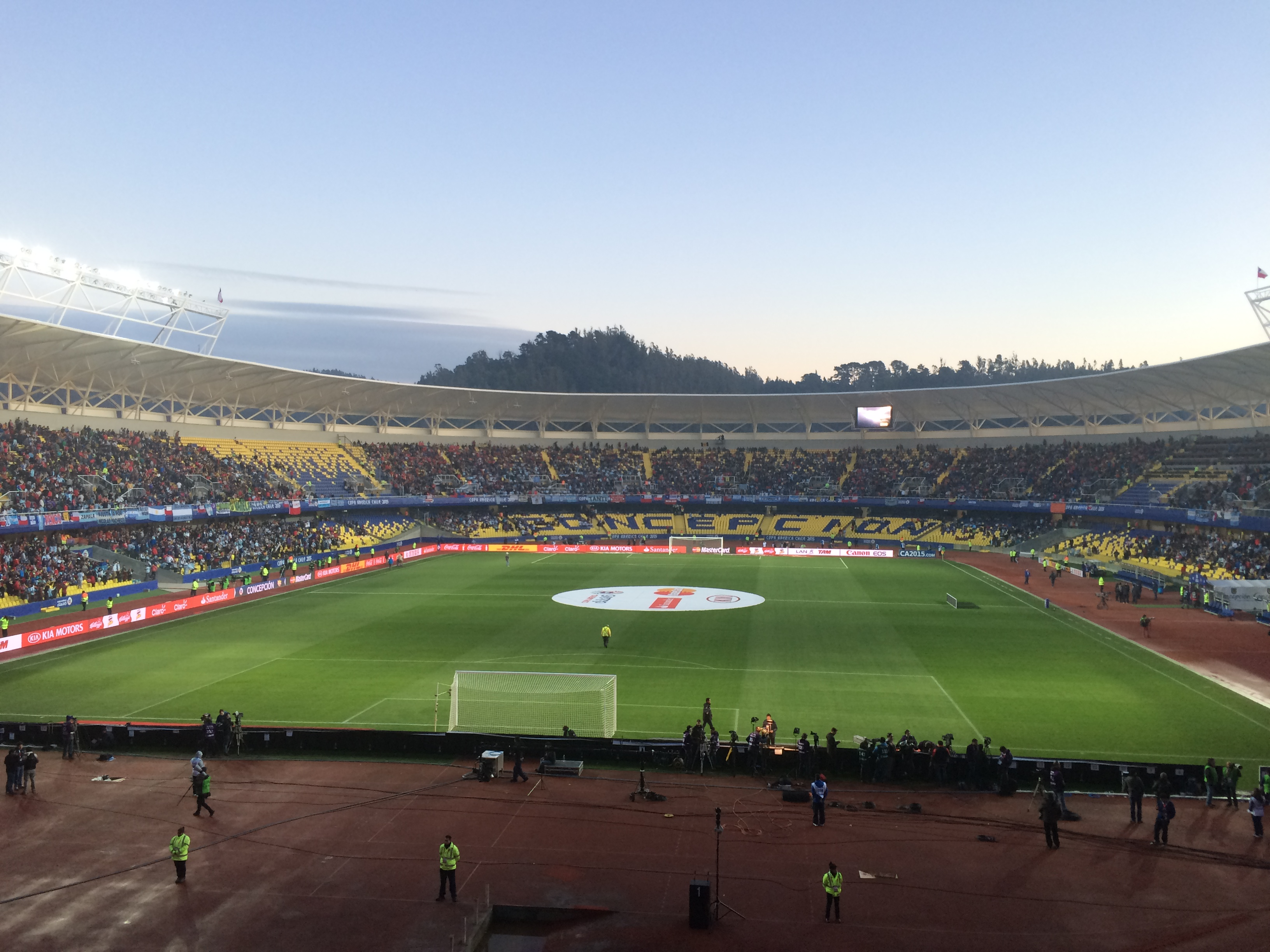
Estadio Ester Roa, the largest stadium of the Biobío Region and potential venue for the 2030 South American Games.

Some of the venues proposed to host the Games include the following:

- Concepción:
  - Estadio Ester Roa
- Talcahuano:
  - Estadio Huachipato-CAP Acero
  - Complejo Deportivo Huachipato
  - Coliseo La Tortuga
- Los Ángeles:
  - Estadio Municipal de Los Ángeles
- San Pedro de La Paz:
  - Cendyr Náutico

== Sports ==
According to the bid to host the 2030 Games, this edition will include 34 disciplines.

- Aquatics
  - Diving
  - Swimming
  - Water polo
- Archery
- Athletics
- Badminton
- Basketball
- Basque pelota
- Boxing
- Canoeing
- Cycling
- Equestrian
  - Dressage
  - Jumping
- Fencing
- Field hockey
- Football
- Golf
- Gymnastics
  - Artistic gymnastics
  - Rhythmic gymnastics
  - Trampoline
- Handball
- Judo
- Karate
- Modern pentathlon
- Roller sports
  - Artistic roller skating
  - Skateboarding
  - Inline speed skating
- Rowing
- Rugby sevens
- Sailing
- Shooting
- Sport climbing
- Surfing
- Table tennis
- Taekwondo
- Tennis
- Triathlon
- Volleyball
  - Beach volleyball
  - Volleyball
- Water skiing
- Weightlifting
- Wrestling
  - Freestyle wrestling
  - Greco-Roman wrestling

Bocce, bowling, esports, padel, racquetball, softball and squash don't appear in the preliminary list of sports for the 2030 Games, despite appearing in the previous edition, while basketball will return after not being part of the 2026 Games.

== Participating nations ==
15 countries are eligible to participate in the 2030 South American Games:

- Argentina
- Aruba
- Bolivia
- Brazil
- Chile (host)
- Colombia
- Curaçao
- Ecuador
- Guyana
- Panama
- Paraguay
- Peru
- Suriname
- Uruguay
- Venezuela
