= Triathlon at the 2014 South American Games =

There were 3 triathlon events at the 2014 South American Games. The top two in each singles event qualifies for the 2015 Pan American Games in Toronto, Canada.

== Medal summary ==
=== Medal table ===
Rank	Nation	Gold	Silver	Bronze	Total
1	Argentina (ARG)	1	1	1	3
1	Chile (CHI)	1	1	1	3
3	Brazil (BRA)	1	1	0	2
4	Ecuador (ECU)	0	0	1	1
Totals (4 entries)		3	3	3	9

=== Medalists ===
Event	Gold	Silver	Bronze
Men's	Gonzalo Tellechea; Argentina	Luciano Taccone; Argentina	Luis Barraza; Chile
Women's	Bárbara Riveros; Chile	Pâmella Oliveira; Brazil	Elizabeth Bravo; Ecuador
Mixed relay	Danilo Araújo; Diogo Marins; Beatriz Neres; Pâmella Oliveira; Brazil	Gaspar Diaz; Luis Barraza; Bárbara Riveros; Valentina Carvallo; Chile	Luciano Farias; Gonzalo Tellechea; Maria Rivero; Romina Biagioli; Argentina
