= Bocce at the 2022 South American Games =

Bocce competitions at the 2022 South American Games

- Venue: Bochódromo
- Dates: October 12−14
- Nations: 6

Bocce competitions at the 2022 South American Games in Asunción, Paraguay were held between October 12 and 14, 2022 at the Bochódromo.

== Schedule ==
The competition schedule is as follows:

P	Preliminary round	F	Final

Date Event	Wed 12	Thu 13	Fri 14
Mixed lyonnaise doubles	P	P	F
Mixed pétanque doubles	P	P	F
Mixed raffa doubles	P	P	F

== Medal summary ==
=== Medal table ===
* Host nation (Paraguay)

Rank	Nation	Gold	Silver	Bronze	Total
1	Argentina (ARG)	1	2	0	3
2	Chile (CHI)	1	0	1	2
3	Venezuela (VEN)	1	0	0	1
4	Paraguay (PAR)*	0	1	1	2
5	Peru (PER)	0	0	2	2
5	Uruguay (URU)	0	0	2	2
Totals (6 entries)		3	3	6	12

=== Medalists ===
Event	Gold	Silver	Bronze
Mixed lyonnaise doubles	Franco Barbano; Melisa Polito; Chile	Lucas Hecker; Carla Cabrera; Argentina	Alexis Morón; Paloma Macedo; Peru
Mixed lyonnaise doubles	Franco Barbano; Melisa Polito; Chile	Lucas Hecker; Carla Cabrera; Argentina	Johny Sanguinet; Karen Sanguinet; Uruguay
Mixed pétanque doubles	José Manuel Marcano; María de Jesús Pérez; Venezuela	Guillermo Montemerlo; Romina Bolatti; Argentina	Aníbal Recalde; Susana De García; Paraguay
Mixed pétanque doubles	José Manuel Marcano; María de Jesús Pérez; Venezuela	Guillermo Montemerlo; Romina Bolatti; Argentina	Rodolfo Gálvez; Melisa Polito; Chile
Mixed raffa doubles	Jonathan Rupere; Milagros Pereyra; Argentina	Marcos Moreira; Ramona Torres; Paraguay	Sandro Saletti; Mariolina Saletti; Peru
Mixed raffa doubles	Jonathan Rupere; Milagros Pereyra; Argentina	Marcos Moreira; Ramona Torres; Paraguay	Elías Fagian; Yamila Fernández; Uruguay

== Participation ==
Six nations participated in bocce of the 2022 South American Games.

- Argentina
- Chile
- Paraguay
- Peru
- Uruguay
- Venezuela

== Results ==
=== Mixed lyonnaise doubles ===
Rank	Athletes	Nation	Qualification				Semifinal		Final	
Rank	Athletes	Nation	Points	T-Points	Score	Rank	Points	T-Points	Points	T-Points
1st place, gold medalist(s)	Melissa Polito; Franco Barbano	Chile	208	282	0.74	2	112	138	104	140
2nd place, silver medalist(s)	Carla Cabrera; Lucas Hecker	Argentina	221	281	0.79	1	111	138	97	138
3rd place, bronze medalist(s)	Paloma Macedo; Alexis Moron	Peru	160	244	0.66	3	73	124	Did not advance	
3rd place, bronze medalist(s)	Karen Sanguinet; Johny Sanguinet	Uruguay	143	226	0.63	4	75	111	Did not advance	
5	Mikarly Coronado; Jesús Ríos Corrales	Venezuela	138	253	0.55	5	Did not advance			
6	Aelin Teleken; Mariel Albes	Paraguay	121	233	0.52	6	Did not advance			

=== Mixed petanque doubles ===
Zone A

Pos	Team	Pld	W	D	L	GF	GA	GD	Pts	Qualification	VEN	PAR	PER
1	José Manuel Marcano – María de Jesús Pérez (Venezuela)	2	2	0	0	22	6	+16	6	Semifinals	—	12–3	10–3
2	Anibal Recalde – Susana De García (Paraguay)	2	1	0	1	9	17	−8	3	Semifinals	3–12	—	6–5
3	Franz Saenz – Rosalba Rojas (Peru)	2	0	0	2	8	16	−8	0		3–10	5–6	—

Zone B

Pos	Team	Pld	W	D	L	GF	GA	GD	Pts	Qualification	ARG	CHI	URU
1	Guillermo Montemerlo – Romina Bolatti (Argentina)	2	2	0	0	17	14	+3	6	Semifinals	—	8–7	9–7
2	Rofoldo Gálvez – Melisa Polito (Chile)	2	1	0	1	20	8	+12	3	Semifinals	7–8	—	13–0
3	Cristian Calero – Sofia Barbeyto (Uruguay)	2	0	0	2	7	22	−15	0		7–9	0–13	—

Knockout

Semifinals
(Venezuela) José Manuel Marcano – María de Jesús Pérez	11
(Chile) Rofoldo Gálvez – Melisa Polito	8
(Paraguay) Anibal Recalde – Susana De García	7
(Argentina) Guillermo Montemerlo – Romina Bolatti	12

Final
(Venezuela) José Manuel Marcano – María de Jesús Pérez	11
(Argentina) Guillermo Montemerlo – Romina Bolatti	6

=== Mixed raffa doubles ===
Zone A

Pos	Team	Pld	W	D	L	GF	GA	GD	Pts	Qualification	PAR	PER	CHI
1	Marcos Moreira – Ramona Torres (Paraguay)	2	2	0	0	20	11	+9	6	Semifinals	—	8–7	12–4
2	Sandro Saletti – Mariolina Saletti (Peru)	2	1	0	1	16	16	0	3	Semifinals	7–8	—	9–8
3	Rodolfo Gálvez – Franca Martini (Chile)	2	0	0	2	12	21	−9	0		4–12	8–9	—

Zone B

Pos	Team	Pld	W	D	L	GF	GA	GD	Pts	Qualification	ARG	URU	VEN
1	Jonathan Rupere – Milagros Pereyra (Argentina)	2	2	0	0	19	5	+14	6	Semifinals	—	7–5	12–0
2	Elias Cotignolo – Yamila Fernández (Uruguay)	2	1	0	1	12	13	−1	3	Semifinals	5–7	—	7–6
3	Cristian Velasquez – Kelineth Mejías (Venezuela)	2	0	0	2	6	19	−13	0		0–12	6–7	—

Knockout

Semifinals
(Paraguay) Marcos Moreira – Ramona Torres	12
(Uruguay) Elias Cotignolo – Yamila Fernández	10
(Peru) Sandro Saletti – Mariolina Saletti	8
(Argentina) Jonathan Rupere – Milagros Pereyra	9

Final
(Paraguay) Marcos Moreira – Ramona Torres	3
(Argentina) Jonathan Rupere – Milagros Pereyra	12
