= Bowling at the 2022 South American Games =

Bowling competitions at the 2022 South American Games

- Venue: Strike Bowling
- Dates: October 9−12
- Nations: 12

Bowling competitions at the 2022 South American Games in Asunción, Paraguay were held between October 9 and 12, 2022 at the Strike Bowling.

== Schedule ==
The competition schedule is as follows:

P	Preliminary round	F	Final

Date Event	Sun 9	Mon 10		Tue 11	Wed 12	
Men's singles				P	P	F
Men's doubles	P	P	F			
Women's singles				P	P	F
Women's doubles	P	P	F			

== Medal summary ==
=== Medal table ===
* Host nation (Paraguay)

Rank	Nation	Gold	Silver	Bronze	Total
1	Aruba (ARU)	2	0	0	2
2	Brazil (BRA)	1	1	0	2
3	Peru (PER)	1	0	0	1
4	Colombia (COL)	0	3	3	6
5	Venezuela (VEN)	0	0	2	2
6	Argentina (ARG)	0	0	1	1
6	Ecuador (ECU)	0	0	1	1
6	Panama (PAN)	0	0	1	1
Totals (8 entries)		4	4	8	16

=== Medalists ===
Event	Gold	Silver	Bronze
Men's singles	Kenny Kishimoto; Peru	Jaime González; Colombia	Raúl Ayala; Ecuador
Men's singles	Kenny Kishimoto; Peru	Jaime González; Colombia	Andrés Gómez; Colombia
Men's doubles	Bruno Costa; Marcelo Suartz; Brazil	Andrés Gómez; Jaime González; Colombia	Luis Rovaina; Rodolfo Monacelli; Venezuela
Men's doubles	Bruno Costa; Marcelo Suartz; Brazil	Andrés Gómez; Jaime González; Colombia	Donald Lee; William Duen; Panama
Women's singles	Kamilah Dammers; Aruba	Juliana Franco; Colombia	Clara Guerrero; Colombia
Women's singles	Kamilah Dammers; Aruba	Juliana Franco; Colombia	Vanesa Rinke; Argentina
Women's doubles	Abigail Dammers; Kamilah Dammers; Aruba	Roberta Rodrigues; Stephanie Martins; Brazil	Clara Guerrero; Juliana Franco; Colombia
Women's doubles	Abigail Dammers; Kamilah Dammers; Aruba	Roberta Rodrigues; Stephanie Martins; Brazil	Alicia Marcano; Karen Marcano; Venezuela

== Participation ==
Twelve nations participated in bowling of the 2022 South American Games.

- Argentina
- Aruba
- Bolivia
- Brazil
- Chile
- Colombia
- Ecuador
- Panama
- Paraguay
- Peru
- Uruguay
- Venezuela

== Results ==
=== Men's singles ===
Ranking Round

Rank	Athlete	Nation	1st Round	2nd Round	Total	Notes
1	Kenny Kishimoto	Peru	1310	1309	2619	Q
2	Marcelo Suartz	Brazil	1280	1276	2556	Q
3	Gustavo Wong	Ecuador	1249	1298	2547	Q
4	Raúl Ayala	Ecuador	1255	1274	2529	Q
5	Luis Rovaina	Venezuela	1290	1227	2517	Q
6	Andrés Gómez	Colombia	1236	1262	2498	Q
7	Jaime González	Colombia	1263	1221	2484	Q
8	Diego Friedmann	Uruguay	1209	1274	2493	Q
9	William Duen	Panama	1278	1205	2483	
10	Bruno Costa	Brazil	1287	1181	2468	
11	Mauricio Oelsner	Bolivia	1229	1198	2427	
12	Alexis Plakoudakis	Argentina	1181	1230	2411	
13	Victor Tateishi	Peru	1117	1284	2401	
14	Rodolfo Monacelli	Venezuela	1164	1235	2399	
15	Donald Lee	Panama	1251	1106	2357	
16	Jesús Borgueaud	Chile	1123	1191	2314	
17	Oscar Rodríguez	Argentina	1072	1204	2276	
18	Matías Moguilner	Paraguay	1148	1109	2257	
19	José Ignacio Miranda	Bolivia	983	1207	2190	
20	Patricio Borquez	Chile	1164	998	2162	
21	Joaquín Manrique	Uruguay	1081	1047	2128	
22	Jorge Tomas	Paraguay	1042	1054	2096	

Knockout

Quarterfinals
(Peru) Kenny Kishimoto	637
(Uruguay) Diego Friedman	587
(Ecuador) Raúl Ayala	615
(Venezuela) Luis Rovaina	576
(Brazil) Marcelo Suartz	591
(Colombia) Jaime González	722
(Ecuador) Gustavo Wong	573
(Colombia) Andrés Gómez	648

Semifinals
(Peru) Kenny Kishimoto	647
(Ecuador) Raúl Ayala	527
(Colombia) Jaime González	647
(Colombia) Andrés Gómez	591

Final
(Peru) Kenny Kishimoto	686
(Colombia) Jaime González	620

=== Men's doubles ===
Ranking Round

Rank	Athlete	Nation	1st Round	2nd Round	Total	Notes
1	Marcelo Suartz / Bruno Costa	Brazil	2505	2791	5296	Q
2	Andrés Gómez / Jaime González	Colombia	2564	2473	5037	Q
3	Luis Rovaina / Rodolfo Monacelli	Venezuela	2579	2444	5023	Q
4	William Duen / Donald Lee	Panama	2527	2328	4855	Q
5	Jesús Borgueaud / Patricio Borquez	Chile	2382	2377	4759	
6	Diego Friedmann / Joaquín Manrique	Uruguay	2270	2463	4733	
7	Kenny Kishimoto / Victor Tateishi	Peru	2451	2255	4706	
8	Gustavo Wong / Raúl Ayala	Ecuador	2325	2377	4702	
9	Alexis Plakoudakis / Oscar Rodríguez	Argentina	2230	2302	4532	
10	Mauricio Oelsner / José Ignacio Miranda	Bolivia	2192	2293	4485	
11	Matías Moguilner / Jorge Tomás	Paraguay	1898	1985	3883	

Knockout

Semifinals
(Brazil) Marcelo Suartz / Bruno Costa	1344
(Panama) William Duen / Donald Lee	1190
(Colombia) Andrés Gómez / Jaime González	1301
(Venezuela) Luis Rovaina / Rodolfo Monacelli	1088

Final
(Brazil) Marcelo Suartz / Bruno Costa	1375
(Colombia) Andrés Gómez / Jaime González	1322

=== Women's singles ===
Rank	Athlete	Nation	1st Round	2nd Round	Total	Notes
1	Kamilah Dammers	Aruba	1308	1419	2727	Q
2	Juliana Franco	Colombia	1268	1340	2608	Q
3	Roberta Rodrigues	Brazil	1299	1243	2542	Q
4	Stephanie Martins	Brazil	1287	1197	2484	Q
5	Clara Guerrero	Colombia	1242	1204	2446	Q
6	Vanesa Rinke	Argentina	1206	1226	2432	Q
7	Abigail Dammers	Aruba	1220	1211	2431	Q
8	Karen Marcano	Venezuela	1124	1187	2311	Q
9	Yumi Yuzuriha	Peru	1112	1164	2276	
10	Alicia Marcano	Venezuela	1138	1087	2225	
11	María de las Mercedes Pérez	Argentina	1087	1100	2187	
12	Verónica Valdebenito	Chile	1039	1059	2098	
13	María José Belleza	Peru	1076	1001	2077	
14	Francisca Figueroa	Chile	1033	956	1989	
15	Chie Umayahara	Paraguay	985	940	1925	
16	Susana López	Paraguay	930	966	1896	

Knockout

Quarterfinals
(Aruba) Kamilah Dammers	621
(Venezuela) Karen Marcano	602
(Brazil) Stephanie Martins	627
(Colombia) Clara Guerrero	648
(Colombia) Juliana Franco	675
(Aruba) Abigail Dammers	540
(Brazil) Roberta Rodrigues	565
(Argentina) Vanesa Rinke	606

Semifinals
(Aruba) Kamilah Dammers	678
(Colombia) Clara Guerrero	590
(Colombia) Juliana Franco	597
(Argentina) Vanesa Rinke	593

Final
(Aruba) Kamilah Dammers	615
(Colombia) Juliana Franco	601

=== Women's doubles ===
Ranking Round

Rank	Athlete	Nation	1st Round	2nd Round	Total	Notes
1	Karen Marcano / Alicia Marcano	Venezuela	2485	2706	5191	Q
2	Kamilah Dammers / Abigail Dammers	Aruba	2471	2491	4962	Q
3	Juliana Franco / Clara Guerrero	Colombia	2448	2498	4946	Q
4	Roberta Rodrigues / Stephanie Martins	Brazil	2435	2206	4641	Q
5	Vanesa Rinke / María de las Mercedes Pérez	Argentina	2273	2281	4554	
6	Yumi Yuzuriha / María José Belleza	Peru	2175	2119	4294	
7	Verónica Valdebenito / Francisca Figueroa	Chile	1930	1986	3916	
8	Chie Umayahara / Susana López	Paraguay	1911	1944	3855	

Knockout

Semifinals
(Venezuela) Karen Marcano / Alicia Marcano	1210
(Brazil) Roberta Rodrigues / Stephanie Martins	1338
(Aruba) Kamilah Dammers / Abigail Dammers	1336
(Colombia) Juliana Franco / Clara Guerrero	1140

Final
(Brazil) Roberta Rodrigues / Stephanie Martins	1216
(Aruba) Kamilah Dammers / Abigail Dammers	1271
