= Gymnastics at the 1978 South American Games =

Gymnastics events were competed at the 1978 Southern Cross Games in La Paz, Bolivia.

== Medal summary ==
=== Medal table ===
Rank	Nation	Gold	Silver	Bronze	Total
1	Chile (CHI)	8	6	3	17
2	Argentina (ARG)	6	6	9	21
3	Bolivia (BOL)	0	0	1	1
Totals (3 entries)		14	12	13	39

=== Artistic gymnastics ===
==== Men ====
Event	Gold	Silver	Bronze
Team all-around	Argentina; Raimundo Blanco; Walter Quintero; Néstor Schettino; Juan Carlos D'Andrea; Miguel Angel Palmeiro	—	—
Individual all-around	Hugo Vergara (CHI)	Raimundo Blanco (ARG)	Walter Quintero (ARG)
Floor exercise	Juan Carlos D'Andrea (ARG)	Walter Quintero (ARG)	Enrique González (CHI)
Pommel horse	Miguel Angel Palmeiro (ARG)	Raimundo Blanco (ARG)	Enrique González (CHI)
Rings	Raimundo Blanco (ARG)	Néstor Schettino (ARG)	Alex Ticona (BOL)
Vault	Néstor Schettino (ARG)	Hugo Vergara (CHI)	Walter Quintero (ARG)
Parallel bars	Hugo Vergara (CHI)	Néstor Schettino (ARG)	Juan Carlos D'Andrea (ARG)
Horizontal bar	Hugo Vergara (CHI)	Juan Carlos D'Andrea (ARG)	Raimundo Blanco (ARG)

==== Women ====
Event	Gold	Silver	Bronze
Team all-around	Argentina; Elena Lario; Cecilia Almada; Patricia Miracle; Silvia Moreno; Marisa Grigioni	—	—
Individual all-around	Maria Luiza Andueza (CHI)	Consuelo Sáenz (CHI)	Elena Lario (ARG)
Vault	Maria Luiza Andueza (CHI)	Consuelo Sáenz (CHI)	Marisa Grigioni (ARG)
Uneven bars	Consuelo Sáenz (CHI)	Maria Luiza Andueza (CHI)	Elena Lario (ARG)
Balance beam	Maria Luiza Andueza (CHI)	Consuelo Sáenz (CHI)	Elena Lario (ARG)
Floor exercise	Consuelo Sáenz (CHI)	Maria Luiza Andueza (CHI)	Silvia Moreno (ARG) Isabel Pérez de Castro (CHI)
