= Bodybuilding at the 2022 South American Games =

Bodybuilding competitions at the 2022 South American Games

- Venue: Fan Fest - COP
- Dates: October 2
- Nations: 9

Bodybuilding competitions at the 2022 South American Games in Asunción, Paraguay were held on October 2, 2022 at the Fan Fest - COP

== Schedule ==
All events were scheduled on 2 October.

== Medal summary ==
=== Medal table ===
* Host nation (Paraguay)

Rank	Nation	Gold	Silver	Bronze	Total
1	Venezuela	3	2	1	6
2	Ecuador	2	1	0	3
3	Paraguay*	1	2	0	3
4	Argentina	0	1	1	2
5	Chile	0	0	2	2
6	Colombia	0	0	1	1
6	Uruguay	0	0	1	1
Totals (7 entries)		6	6	6	18

=== Medalists ===
Event	Gold	Silver	Bronze
Men's choreographic fitness	Darío Molina; Ecuador	José Ojeda; Venezuela	Pablo Matus; Chile
Men's classic	Villali Linarez; Venezuela	Tomás Guido; Argentina	Michael Delgado; Colombia
Men's physique	José Eurea; Venezuela	Josué De Jesús; Ecuador	Emiliano Hernández; Uruguay
Women's choreographic fitness	Alexandra Santos; Venezuela	María Pérez; Paraguay	Macarena Figueroa; Chile
Women's bikini fitness –1.63m	Silvia Patiño; Paraguay	Lilian Benítez; Paraguay	Michelle Hernández; Venezuela
Women's bikini fitness +1.63m	Rafaela Cornejo; Ecuador	Zairelys Gómez; Venezuela	Johana Beatriz; Argentina

== Participation ==
Nine nations participated in bodybuilding events of the 2022 South American Games.

- Argentina
- Bolivia
- Chile
- Colombia
- Ecuador
- Paraguay
- Peru
- Uruguay
- Venezuela

== Results ==
=== Men's choreographic fitness ===
Rank	Athletes	Nation	Physique	Routine	Total
1st place, gold medalist(s)	Dario Molina	Ecuador	8	5	13
2nd place, silver medalist(s)	José Gabriel Ojeda	Venezuela	12	10	22
3rd place, bronze medalist(s)	Pablo Matus	Chile	10	17	27
4	Walter Mieres	Uruguay	20	18	38

=== Men's classic ===
Rank	Athletes	Nation	Semifinal				Final		
Rank	Athletes	Nation	Rx	R	Points	Rank	Rx	R	Points
1st place, gold medalist(s)	Vilali Linarez	Venezuela	11	10	21	1 Q	14	10	24
2nd place, silver medalist(s)	Tomás Flamini	Argentina	10	20	30	2 Q	7	24	31
3rd place, bronze medalist(s)	Michael Delgado	Colombia	10	28	38	3 Q	11	22	33
4	Juan De La Cruz Vera	Paraguay	26	48	74	5 Q	22	44	66
5	Juan Carlos Tadeo	Ecuador	25	42	67	4 Q	23	46	69
6	Walter Mieres	Uruguay	24	58	82	6	Did not advance		
7	Ayrton Medrano	Bolivia	35	70	105	7	Did not advance		

=== Men's physique ===
Rank	Athletes	Nation	Semifinal		Final
Rank	Athletes	Nation	Points	Rank	Points
1st place, gold medalist(s)	José Alberto Eurea	Venezuela	6	1 Q	7
2nd place, silver medalist(s)	Josué De Jesús	Ecuador	9	2 Q	8
3rd place, bronze medalist(s)	Emiliano Hernández	Paraguay	23	4 Q	15
4	Félix Galluppi	Uruguay	14	3 Q	22
5	Alexis Ronceros	Peru	25	5 Q	23
6	Pablo Matus	Chile	27	6	DNA

=== Women's choreographic fitness ===
Rank	Athletes	Nation	Semifinal				Final		
Rank	Athletes	Nation	Physique	Routine	Points	Rank	Physique	Routine	Points
1st place, gold medalist(s)	Alexandra Santos	Venezuela	5	7	12	1 Q	5	7	12
2nd place, silver medalist(s)	María Bethania Pérez	Paraguay	14	10	24	2 Q	15	9	24
3rd place, bronze medalist(s)	Macarena Figueroa	Chile	12	28	40	3 Q	10	20	30
4	Ana Lucía Falconí	Ecuador	20	22	42	4 Q	20	16	36
5	Alexa Giraldo	Colombia	30	19	49	5 Q	25	23	48
6	María Patricia Huambachano	Peru	30	31	61	6	Did not advance		
7	Ivanna Fernández	Uruguay	30	34	64	7	Did not advance		
8	Luciana Maldonado	Bolivia	40	26	66	8	Did not advance		

=== Women's bikini fitness –1.63m ===
Rank	Athletes	Nation	Semifinal		Final
Rank	Athletes	Nation	Points	Rank	Points
1st place, gold medalist(s)	Silvia Patiño	Paraguay	10	2 Q	8
2nd place, silver medalist(s)	Lilian Benitez	Paraguay	14	3 Q	13
3rd place, bronze medalist(s)	Michelle Hernández	Venezuela	9	1 Q	14
4	Fanny Onofre	Ecuador	16	4 Q	19
5	Olga Pinedo	Peru	25	5 Q	22
6	Macarena Figueroa	Chile	30	6	DNA
7	Ivanna Fernández	Uruguay	37	7	DNA
8	Alexa Giraldo	Colombia	38	8	DNA

=== Women's bikini fitness +1.63m ===
Rank	Athletes	Nation	Total
1st place, gold medalist(s)	Rafaela Cornejo	Ecuador	7
2nd place, silver medalist(s)	Zairelys Gómez	Venezuela	10
3rd place, bronze medalist(s)	Johanna Beatriz	Argentina	15
4	Ana Mercedes Palacios	Paraguay	19
