= Basketball at the 2022 South American Games =

Basketbal competitions at the 2022 South American Games

- Venue: SND Arena; Polideportivo Urbano
- Dates: October 2−15
- Nations: 11

Basketball competitions at the 2022 South American Games in Asunción, Paraguay were held between October 2 and 15, 2022 at the SND Arena and the Polideportivo Urbano.

== Schedule ==
The competition schedule is as follows:

G	Group stage	1/8	Eight-finals	1/4	Quarter-finals	1/2	Semi-finals	B	Bronze medal match	F	Gold medal match

Date Event	Sun 2	Mon 3					Tue 4	Wed 5	Thu 6	Fri 7	Sat 8	Sun 9	Mon 10	Tue 11	Wed 12	Thu 13	Fri 14	Sat 15
Men														G	G	G	G	G
Women								G	G	G	G	G						
Men's 3x3	G	1/8	1/4	1/2	B	F												
Women's 3x3	G	1/8	1/4	1/2	B	F												

== Medal summary ==
=== Medal table ===
* Host nation (Paraguay)

Rank	Nation	Gold	Silver	Bronze	Total
1	Brazil (BRA)	2	0	0	2
2	Colombia (COL)	1	0	2	3
3	Chile (CHI)	1	0	1	2
4	Paraguay (PAR)*	0	3	0	3
5	Venezuela (VEN)	0	1	0	1
6	Uruguay (URU)	0	0	1	1
Totals (6 entries)		4	4	4	12

=== Medalists ===
Event	Gold	Silver	Bronze
Men's tournament	Chile; Agustín Moraga; Benjamín Aguilera; Benjamín Herrera; Carlos Villagrán; Diego Zerene; Fabián Martínez; Gaspar Hernández; Ignacio Ansaldo; Javier Barra; Joaquín Pino; Matías Lubiano; Mauricio Serrano	Paraguay; Carlos Vallejos; Diego Bareiro; Edgar Riveros; Fernando Dose; Franco Benítez; Guillermo Araujo; Jorge Martínez; Jorge Sequera; Luis Ljubetic; Néstor López; Rodney Mercado; Vicenzo Ochipinti	Colombia; Alejandro Minota; Chyse Hardaway; Darwin Blanco; Gian Bacci; Iván Villamoros; Jhan Mejia; José Cabezas; Juan Duarte; Leyder Moreno; Reiner Torres; Tomás Díaz; Yeison Toro
Women's tournament	Colombia; Diana Prens; Gabriela Chivata; Isabel Rodríguez; Jenifer Muñoz; Mabel Martínez; Manuela Ríos; Maria Palacio; Mayra Caicedo; Tania Valencia; Wendy Coy; Yanet Arias; Yuliany Paz	Paraguay; Ana Brítez; Andrea Gómez; Astrid Huttemann; Johana Ghiringhelli; Manuela Ramírez; María Caraves; María Mercado; Marta Peralta; Natalia Quevedo; Paola Ferrari; Tamara Insfrán; Ximena Ibarra	Uruguay; Aldana Gayoso; Camila Kirschenbaum; Carolina Fernández; Josefina Rivera; Josefina Zeballos; Lara Barbato; Lucía Auza; Lucía Schiavo; Maite Pereira; Natasha Dolinsky; Selena Medrick; Sofía Herrera
Men's 3x3 tournament	Brazil; André Ferros; Jonatas de Mello; Leonardo Branquinho; William Weihermann	Venezuela; José Bracho; Kervin Perez; Luis Duarte; Nelson Palacio	Chile; Carlos Lauler; Daniel Arcos; Diego Silva; Sebastián Silva
Women's 3x3 tournament	Brazil; Lays da Silva; Luana Batista; Vanessa Gonçalves; Vitória Marcelino	Paraguay; María Caraves; María Mercado; Marta Peralta; Paola Ferrari	Colombia; Isabel Rodríguez; Manuela Ríos; Wendy Coy; Yuliany Paz

== Participation ==
Eleven nations participated in basketball events of the 2022 South American Games.

- Argentina
- Bolivia
- Brazil
- Chile
- Colombia
- Ecuador
- Panama
- Paraguay
- Suriname
- Uruguay
- Venezuela

== Results ==
=== Men's tournament ===
Pos	Team	Pld	W	L	PF	PA	PD	Pts	Result	CHI	PAR	COL	PAN	BOL
1	Chile	4	4	0	291	203	+88	8	1st place, gold medalist(s)	—	83–76	80–45	53–37	75–45
2	Paraguay	4	3	1	340	243	+97	7	2nd place, silver medalist(s)	76–83	—	66–48	99–64	99–48
3	Colombia	4	2	2	271	245	+26	6	3rd place, bronze medalist(s)	45–80	48–66	—	84–49	94–50
4	Panama	4	1	3	233	305	−72	5		37–53	64–99	49–84	—	83–69
5	Bolivia	4	0	4	212	351	−139	4		45–75	48–99	50–94	69–83	—

=== Women's tournament ===
Pos	Team	Pld	W	L	PF	PA	PD	Pts	Result	COL	PAR	URU	CHI	BOL
1	Colombia	4	4	0	317	212	+105	8	1st place, gold medalist(s)	—	79–62	84–51	73–58	81–41
2	Paraguay	4	3	1	281	249	+32	7	2nd place, silver medalist(s)	62–79	—	75–52	67–57	77–61
3	Uruguay	4	2	2	214	260	−46	6	3rd place, bronze medalist(s)	51–84	52–75	—	59–53	52–48
4	Chile	4	1	3	223	242	−19	5		58–73	57–67	53–59	—	55–43
5	Bolivia	4	0	4	193	265	−72	4		41–81	61–77	48–52	43–55	—

=== Men's 3x3 tournament ===
Group A

Pos	Team	Pld	W	L	PF	PA	PD	Pts	Qualification	VEN	BRA	SUR
1	Venezuela	2	2	0	40	27	+13	4	Quarterfinals	—	19–17	21–10
2	Brazil	2	1	1	38	26	+12	3	Quarterfinals	17–19	—	21–7
3	Suriname	2	0	2	17	42	−25	2	Quarterfinals	10–21	7–21	—

Group B

Pos	Team	Pld	W	L	PF	PA	PD	Pts	Qualification	ECU	PAR	CHI
1	Ecuador	2	1	1	25	29	−4	3	Quarterfinals	—	13–11	12–18
2	Paraguay	2	1	1	33	29	+4	3	Quarterfinals	11–13	—	21–16
3	Chile	2	1	1	24	33	−9	3	Quarterfinals	18–12	16–21	—

Group C

Pos	Team	Pld	W	L	PF	PA	PD	Pts	Qualification	ARG	URU	BOL
1	Argentina	2	2	0	44	27	+17	4	Quarterfinals	—	22–14	22–13
2	Uruguay	2	1	1	35	39	−4	3	Quarterfinals	14–22	—	21–17
3	Bolivia	2	0	2	30	43	−13	2		13–22	17–21	—

Knockout Stage

Quarterfinals
1	Chile	21
8	Uruguay	20
2	Argentina	8
7	Brazil	21

Semifinals
Venezuela	22
Paraguay	15
Chile	12
Brazil	20

Final
Venezuela	18
Brazil	20
Bronze medal match
Paraguay	16
Chile	21

=== Women's 3x3 tournament ===
Group A

Pos	Team	Pld	W	L	PF	PA	PD	Pts	Qualification	CHI	ECU	COL
1	Chile	2	1	1	29	29	0	3	Quarterfinals	—	15–13	14–16
2	Ecuador	2	1	1	26	27	−1	3	Quarterfinals	13–15	—	13–12
3	Colombia	2	1	1	28	27	+1	3	Quarterfinals	16–14	12–13	—

Group B

Pos	Team	Pld	W	L	PF	PA	PD	Pts	Qualification	BRA	PAR	ARG
1	Brazil	2	2	0	33	15	+18	4	Quarterfinals	—	19–7	14–8
2	Paraguay	2	1	1	23	32	−9	3	Quarterfinals	7–19	—	16–16
3	Argentina	2	0	2	21	30	−9	2	Round of 16	8–14	13–13	—

Group C

Pos	Team	Pld	W	L	PF	PA	PD	Pts	Qualification	VEN	URU	BOL
1	Venezuela	2	2	0	36	22	+14	4	Quarterfinals	—	21–13	15–9
2	Uruguay	2	1	1	27	26	+1	3	Quarterfinals	13–21	—	14–5
3	Bolivia	2	0	2	14	29	−15	2	Round of 16	9–15	5–14	—

Knockout Stage

Round of 16
8	Argentina	15
9	Bolivia	12

Quarterfinals
Chile	14
Argentina	15
Paraguay	19
Ecuador	15
Brazil	21
Uruguay	4
Colombia	21
Venezuela	8

Semifinals
Argentina	13
Paraguay	21
Brazil	18
Colombia	12

Final
Paraguay	10
Brazil	21
Bronze medal match
Argentina	13
Colombia	18
