= Bowling at the 2010 South American Games =

There were 15 bowling events at the 2010 South American Games.

== Medal summary ==
=== Medal table ===
Rank	Nation	Gold	Silver	Bronze	Total
1	Colombia (COL)	14	5	2	21
2	Venezuela (VEN)	1	7	5	13
3	Argentina (ARG)	0	2	1	3
4	Brazil (BRA)	0	1	6	7
5	Aruba (ARU)	0	0	1	1
5	Netherlands Antilles (AHO)	0	0	1	1
Totals (6 entries)		15	15	16	46

=== Medalists ===
Event	Gold	Silver	Bronze
Men's events
Men's singles	Manuel Otalora; Colombia	Andrés Gómez; Colombia	Ildemaro Ricardo Ruiz; Venezuela
Men's doubles	Manuel Otalora; Andrés Gómez; Colombia	Juliano Oliveira; Charles Robini; Brazil	Jaime González; David Romero; Colombia
Men's trios	Manuel Otalora; Andrés Gómez; Jaime González; Colombia	Ricardo Javier Rosa; Jonathan Ariel Hocsman; Christian Dalmasso Bonnet; Argentina	Rafael Eduardo Medina; Luis Richard Olivo; Ildemaro Ricardo Ruiz; Venezuela
Men's four players team	Manuel Otalora; Andrés Gómez; Jaime González; David Romero; Colombia	Danny Fung Sun; Rafael Eduardo Medina; Luis Richard Olivo; Ildemaro Ricardo Ruiz; Venezuela	Sebastian Montalbetti; Ricardo Javier Rosa; Jonathan Ariel Hocsman; Christian Dalmasso Bonnet; Argentina
Men's all events singles	Manuel Otalora; Colombia	Jaime González; Colombia	Rafael Eduardo Medina; Venezuela
Men's all events teams	Manuel Otalora; Andrés Gómez; Jaime González; David Romero; Colombia	Danny Fung Sun; Rafael Eduardo Medina; Luis Richard Olivo; Ildemaro Ricardo Ruiz; Venezuela	Juliano Oliveira; Charles Robini; Marcio Vieira; Walter Costa; Brazil
Men's masters			
Women's events
Women's singles			
Women's doubles			
Women's trios			
Women's four players team			
Women's all events singles			
Women's all events teams			
Women's masters			
Mixed events
Mixed doubles	David Romero; Anggie Ramírez; Colombia	Sebastian Montalbetti; Maria de las Mercedes de la Losa; Argentina	Walter Costa; Jacqueline Costa; Brazil
