= Water skiing at the 2022 South American Games =

Water skiing competitions at the 2022 South American Games

- Venue: Costanera Padre Bolik, Encarnación
- Dates: October 7−9
- Nations: 7

Water skiing competitions at the 2022 South American Games in Asunción, Paraguay were held between October 7 and 9, 2022 at the Costanera Padre Bolik, Encarnación

== Schedule ==
The competition schedule is as follows:

P	Preliminary	F	Final round

Date Event	Fri 7	Sat 8	Sun 9
Slalom	P	F	
Jump	P	F	
Trick	P	F	
Overall	P		F
Wakeboard		P	F

== Medal summary ==
=== Medal table ===
* Host nation (Paraguay)

Rank	Nation	Gold	Silver	Bronze	Total
1	Chile (CHI)	4	4	4	12
2	Argentina (ARG)	4	1	2	7
3	Colombia (COL)	1	4	2	7
4	Brazil (BRA)	1	0	2	3
5	Peru (PER)	0	1	0	1
Totals (5 entries)		10	10	10	30

=== Medalists ===
==== Men ====
Event	Gold	Silver	Bronze
Slalom	Felipe Neves; Brazil	Santiago Correa; Colombia	Juan Piwonka; Chile
Jump	Tobías Giorgis; Argentina	Emile Ritter; Chile	Patricio Álvarez; Argentina
Trick	Matías González; Chile	Tobías Giorgis; Argentina	Martín Labra; Chile
Overall	Tobías Giorgis; Argentina	Martín Labra; Chile	Patricio Zohar; Argentina
Wakeboard	Kai Ditsch; Argentina	Jorge Rocha; Colombia	Pedro Pedroso; Brazil

==== Women ====
Event	Gold	Silver	Bronze
Slalom	Dominga González; Chile	Valentina González; Chile	Daniela Verswyvel; Colombia
Jump	Valentina González; Chile	Martina Piedrahita; Colombia	Daniela Verswyvel; Colombia
Trick	Daniela Verswyvel; Colombia	Natalia Cuglievan; Peru	Valentina González; Chile
Overall	Valentina González; Chile	Daniela Verswyvel; Colombia	Dominga González; Chile
Wakeboard	Eugenia de Armas; Argentina	Ignacia Holscher; Chile	Mariana Osmak; Brazil

== Participation ==
Seven nations participated in water skiing events of the 2022 South American Games.

- Argentina
- Brazil
- Chile
- Colombia
- Paraguay
- Peru
- Uruguay
