= Modern pentathlon at the 2018 South American Games =

2018 South American modern Olympic sports events

- Venue: Coliseo Suramericano
- Location: Cochabamba
- Dates: 6–8 June
- Competitors: 35 from 9 nations

There were three Modern pentathlon events at the 2018 South American Games in Cochabamba, Bolivia. One for men, one for women and one mixed. The events were held between June 6 and 8 at the Coliseo Suramericano. All countries competing in each individual event had the right to enter athletes for the 2019 Pan American Games in Lima, Peru in the respective events.

== Medal summary ==
=== Medal table ===
Rank	Nation	Gold	Silver	Bronze	Total
1	Argentina (ARG)	1	2	1	4
2	Chile (CHI)	1	1	0	2
3	Brazil (BRA)	1	0	1	2
4	Ecuador (ECU)	0	0	1	1
Totals (4 entries)		3	3	3	9

=== Medalists ===
Event	Gold	Silver	Bronze
Men's individual	Esteban Bustos; Chile	Benjamin Ortiz; Chile	Sergio Villaymayor; Argentina
Women's individual	Iryna Khokhlova; Argentina	Johanna Zapata; Argentina	Maria Guimaraes; Brazil
Mixed relay	Victor Barbosa; Maria Guimaraes; Brazil	Emmanuel Zapata; Pamela Zapata; Argentina	Nelson Torres; Lourdes Cuaspud; Ecuador

== See also ==
- Modern pentathlon at the 2019 Pan American Games – Qualification
