= Saltos del Monday =

Waterfall in Alto Paraná, Paraguay

Coordinates: 25°33′43″S 54°37′53″W

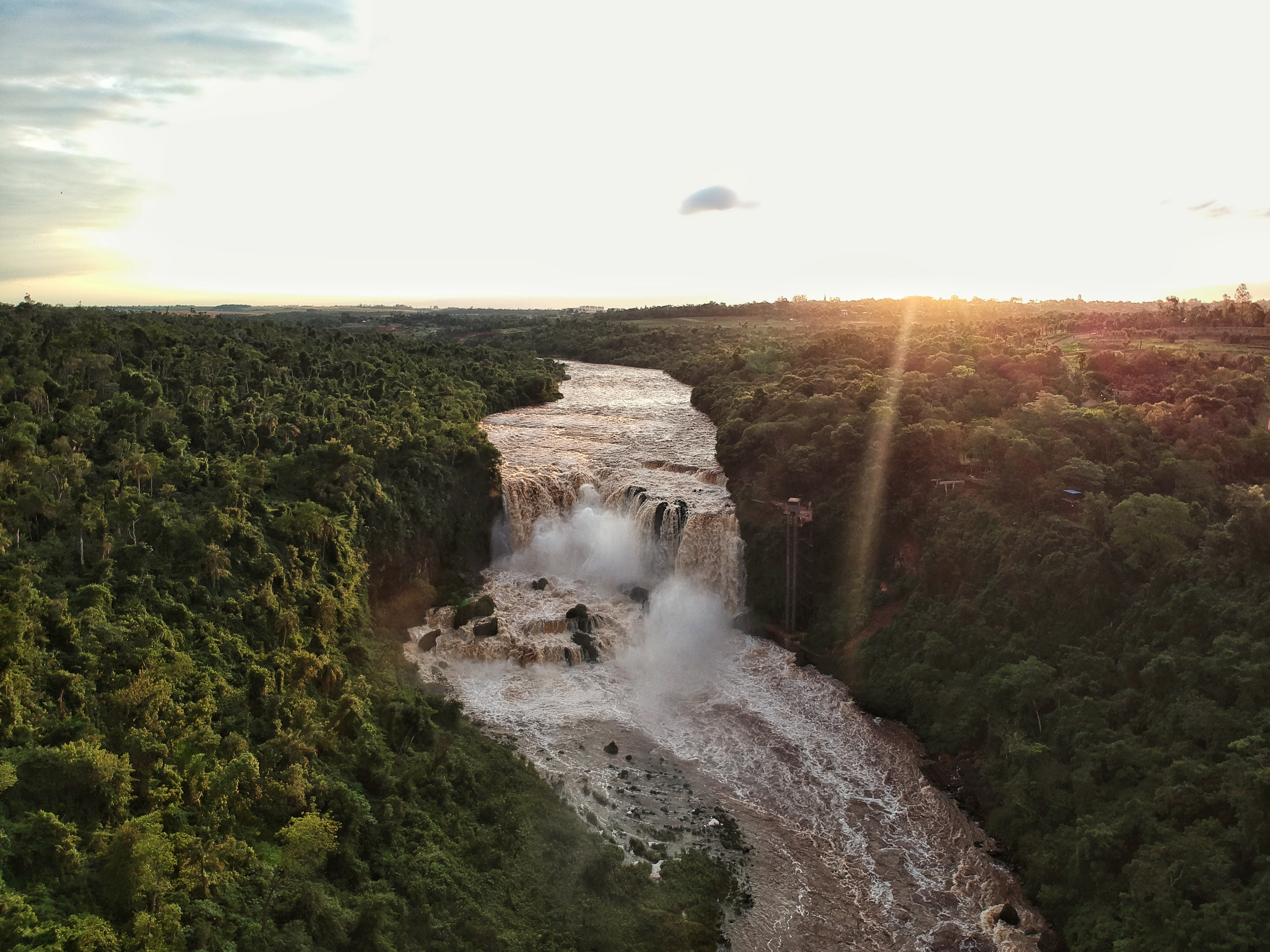
Breathtaking Aerial Panoramic view of Saltos del Monday, Paraguay

The Municipal Park Monday [monˈdaɨ] and its main attraction – approximately 45 m (148 ft) tall and 120 m (390 ft) wide waterfall named Saltos del Monday – are located in the Presidente Franco District, Alto Paraná Department, Paraguay, located around 25°33'40.6"S latitude and 54°38'00.1"W longitude, occupying an area of 1.6 hectares (4 acres).

== Weather ==
The average annual temperature is 21 °C, the highest reaches 38 °C and the minimum 0 °C. The highest annual amount of the country in rainfall occurs in the region of Alto Paraná.

== Animals and Plants ==
The Municipal Park Monday includes a natural reserve of nine hectares covered by a thick vegetation, rich with diverse species of flora and fauna and is one of the last remaining blocks of the Alto Paraná Atlantic forests west from the Paraná River.

== Hydrography ==
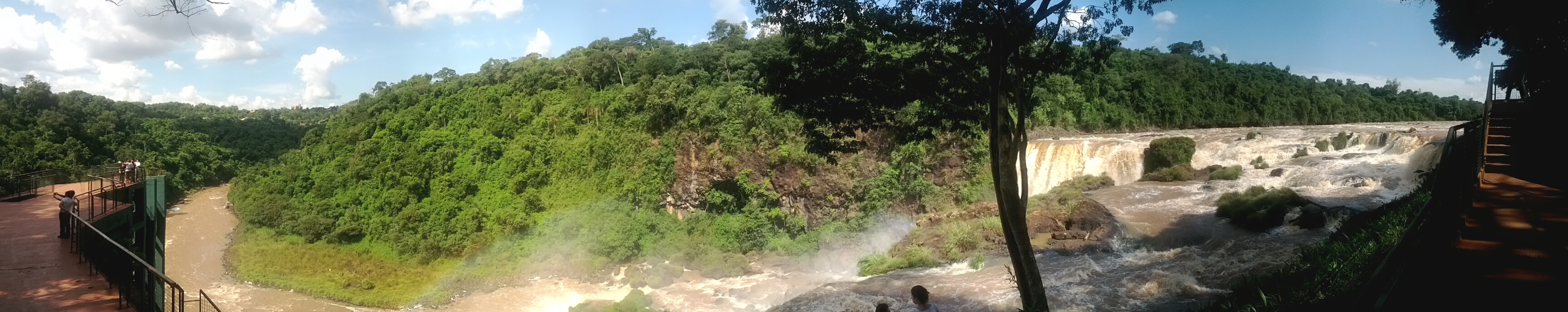
Panoramic view of Saltos del Monday, in Paraguay

The Monday River empties into the Paraná River, has a variable flow depending on the seasons of rain.

== Tourism ==
In Presidente Franco District, nature gives the region a show over the waters. The imposing Monday Falls form a natural spectacle that has a long history; it was one of the stations in the path of the pre-Hispanic Guarani.

The waterfall is more than 40 meters high and consists of three main falls with other minors who rushed up near the mouth of the River Monday, one of the major tributaries of the right bank of the Parana River.

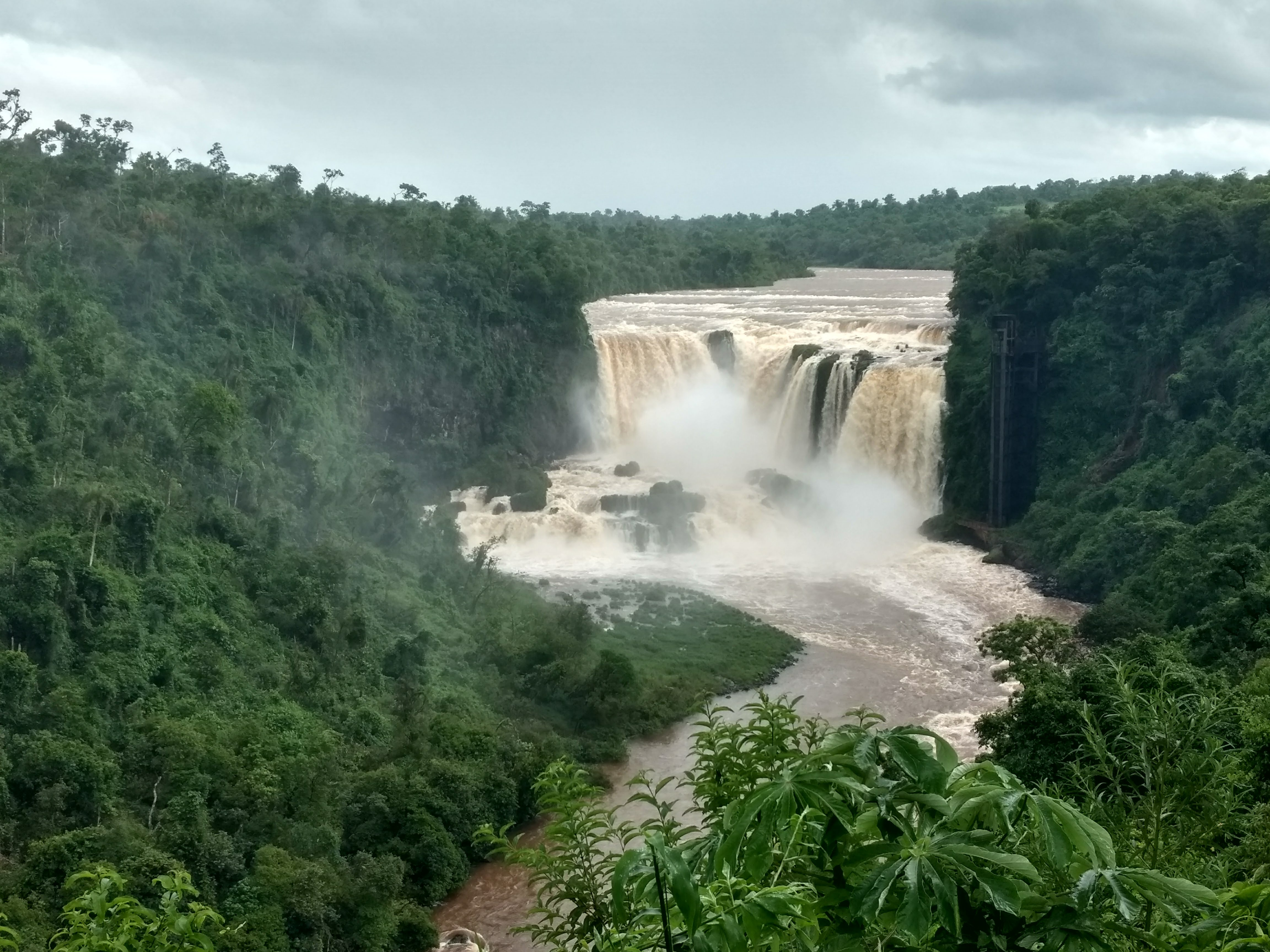
Saltos del Monday front view

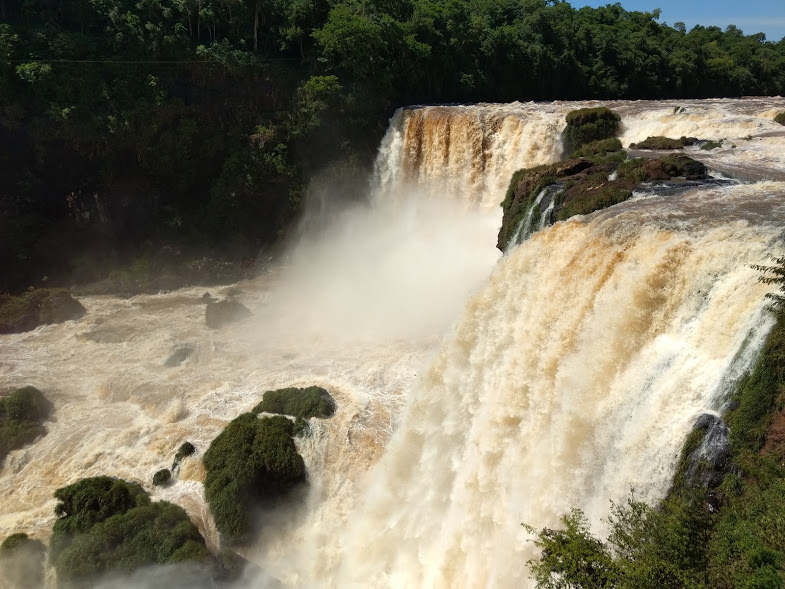
Presidente Franco, Paraguay

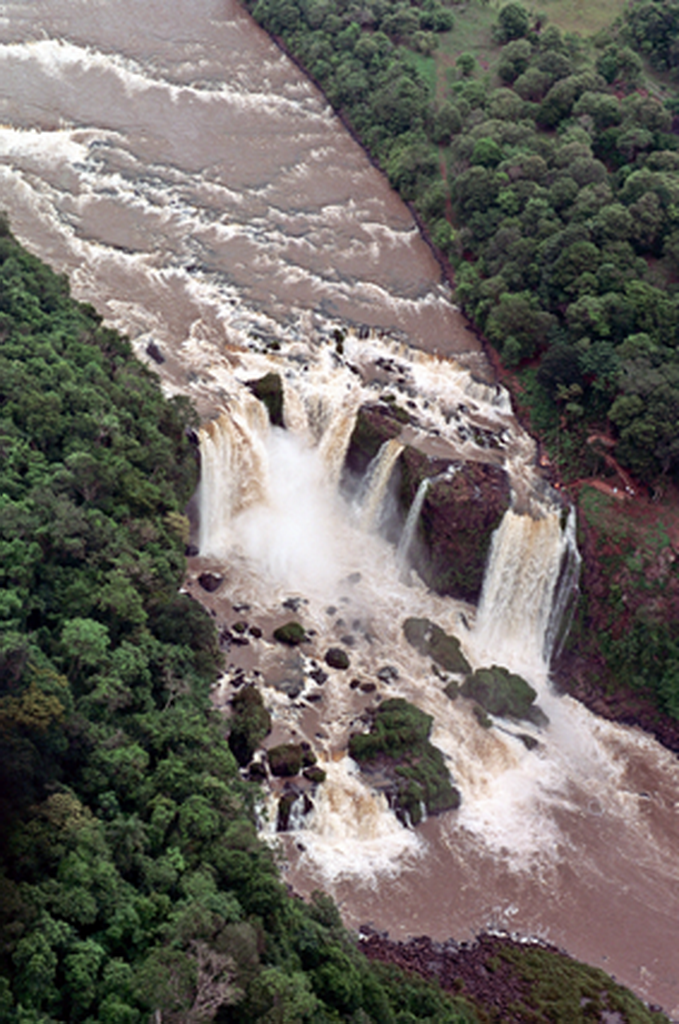
Aerial view of the fall

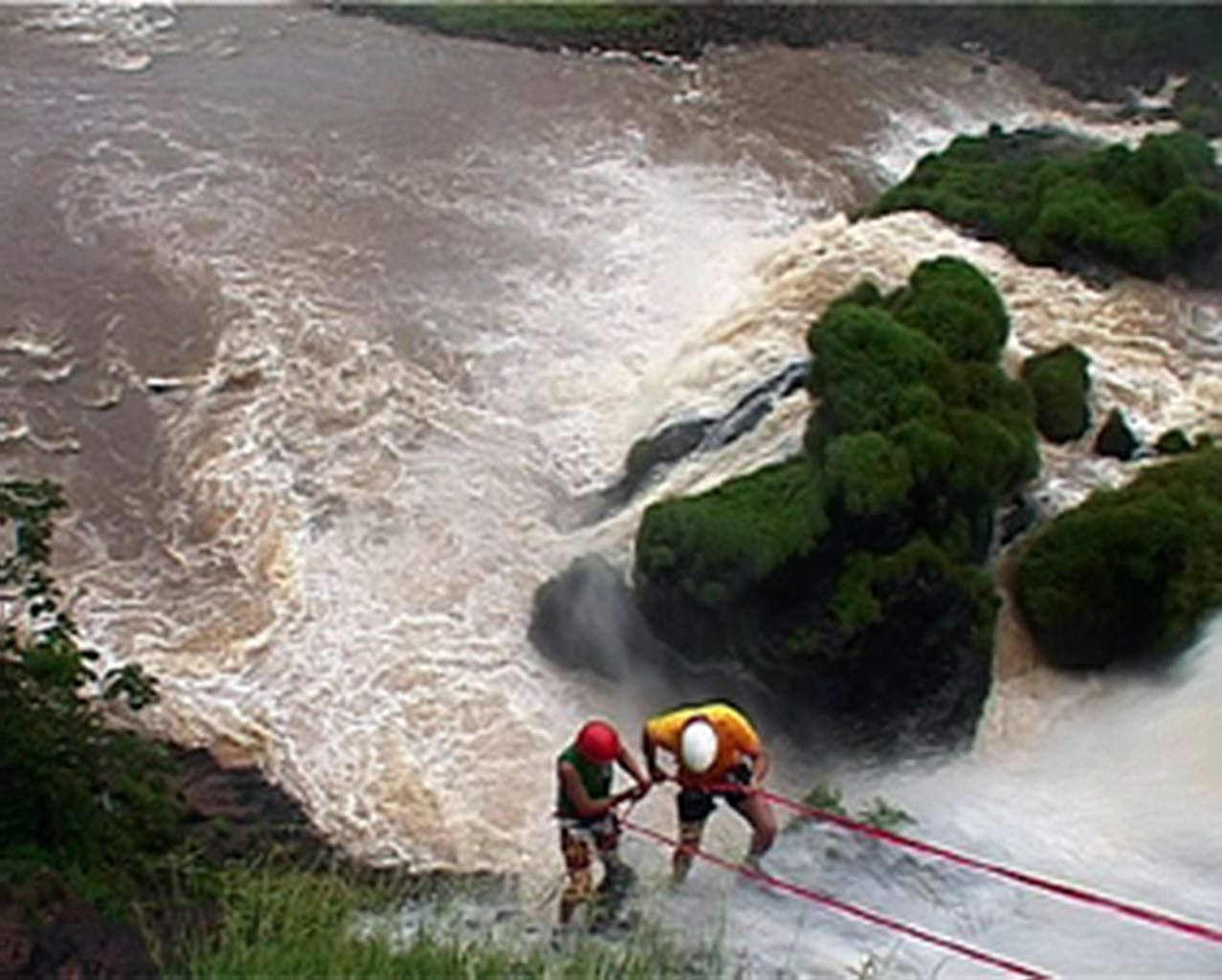
Abseiling in Saltos del Monday, Paraguay

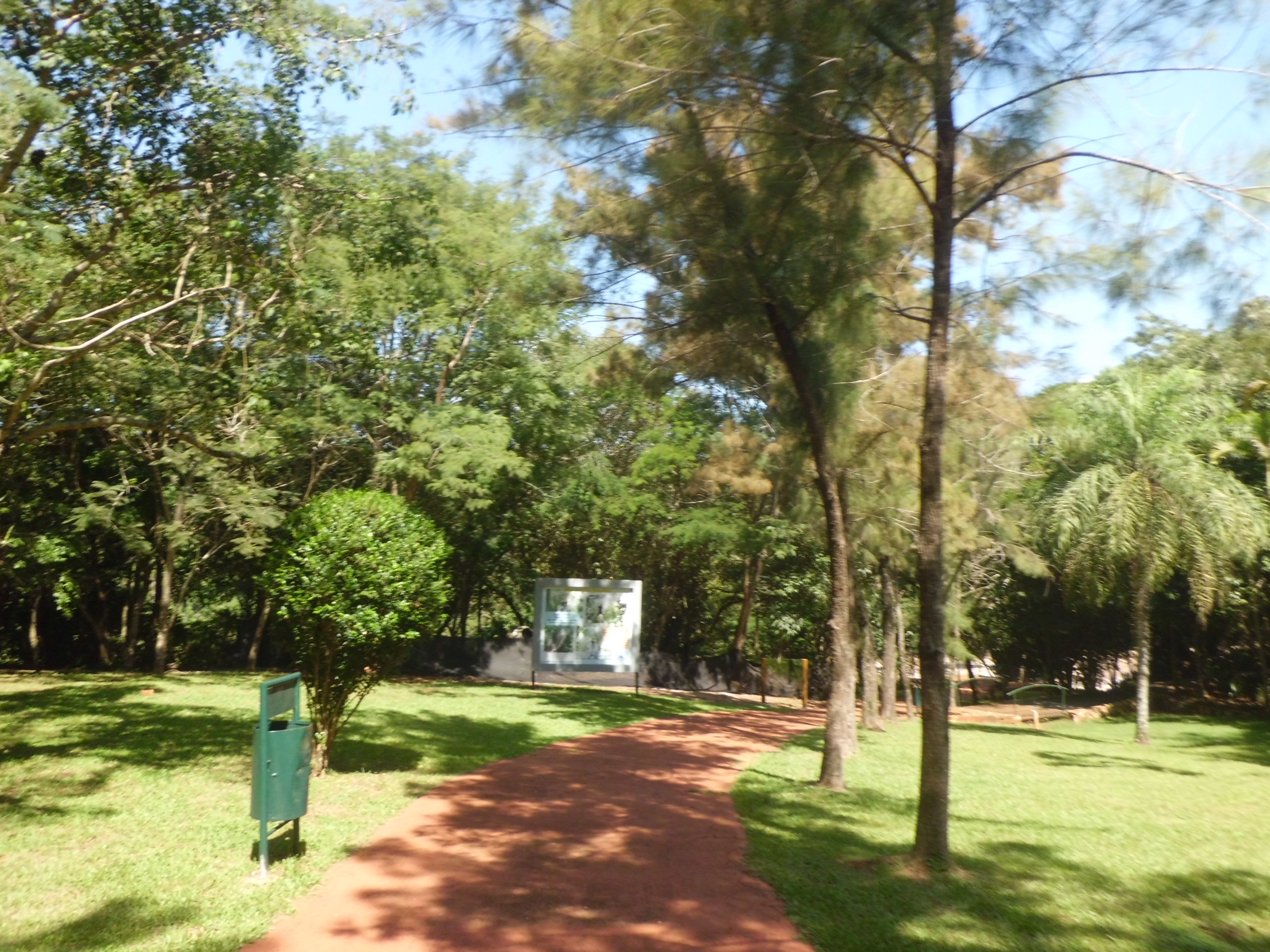
Presidente Franco, Paraguay

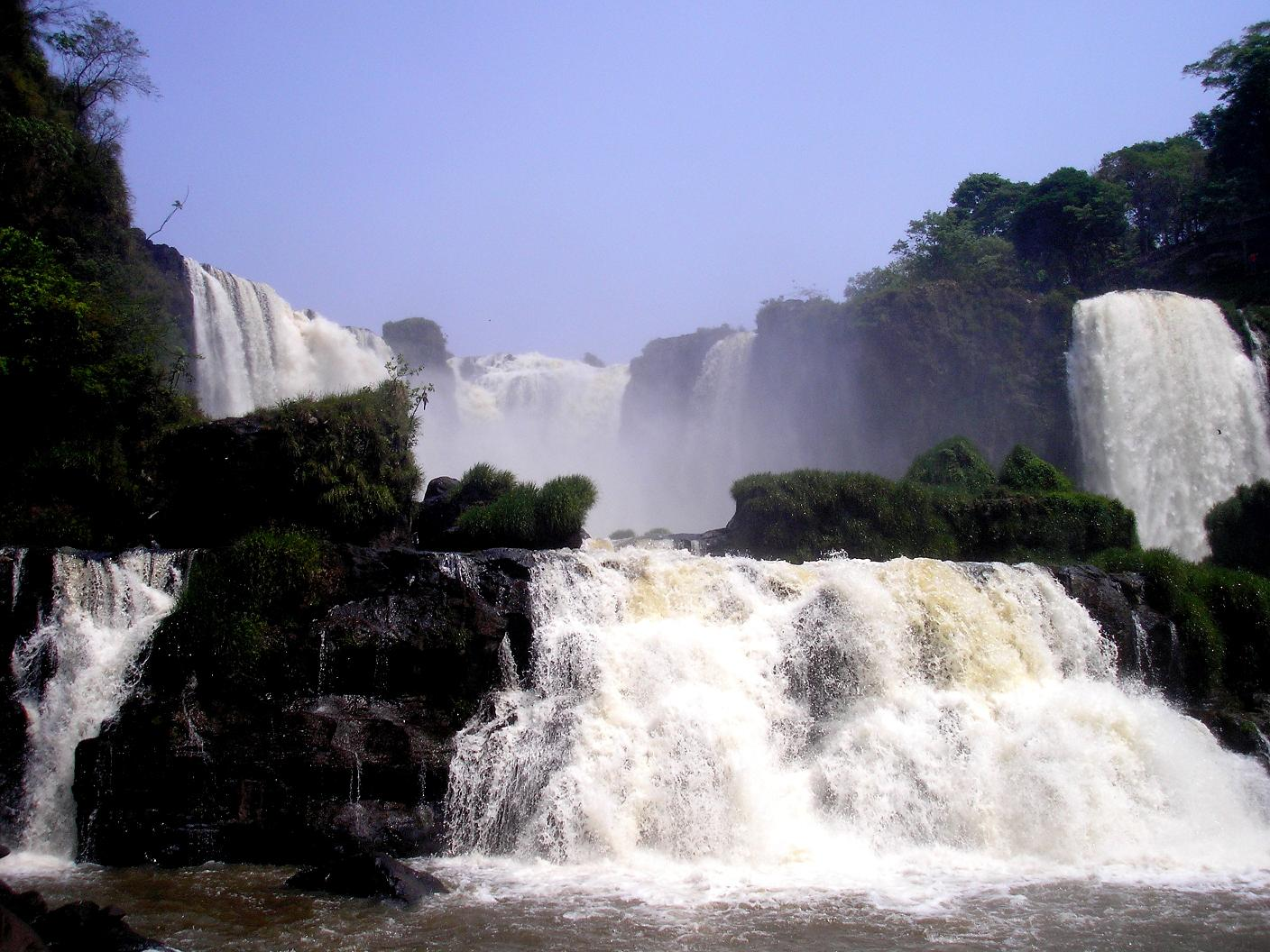
Saltos del Monday, Paraguay

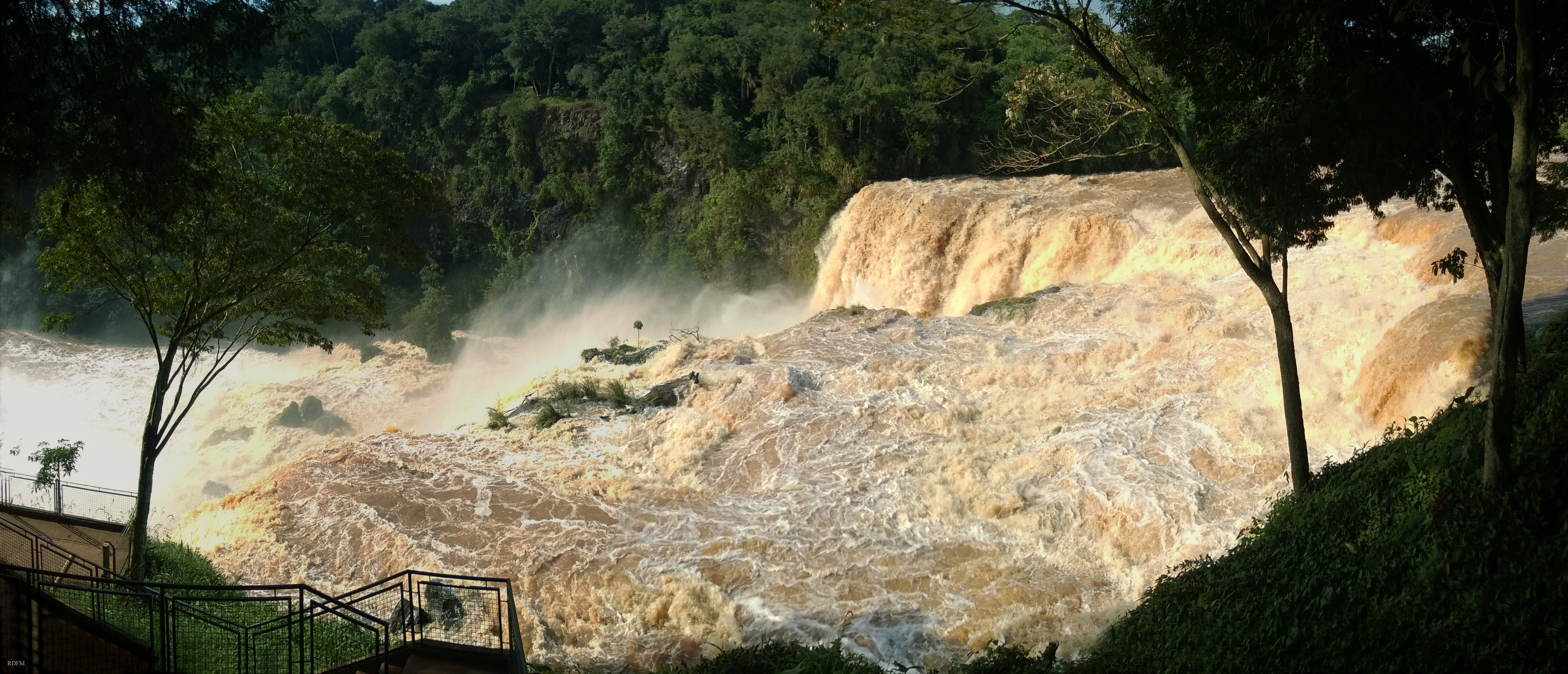
Saltos del Monday, Paraguay

== See also ==
- List of waterfalls
