= Equestrian events at the 2010 South American Games =

Equestrian at the 2010 South American Games
- Dates: March 21–24

There were 7 equestrian events at the 2010 South American Games. The events were held over March 21–24.

== Medal summary ==
=== Medal table ===
Rank	Nation	Gold	Silver	Bronze	Total
1	Colombia (COL)	4	4	2	10
2	Venezuela (VEN)	2	1	4	7
3	Chile (CHI)	1	1	1	3
4	Ecuador (ECU)	0	1	0	1
Totals (4 entries)		7	7	7	21

=== Medalists ===
Event	Gold	Silver	Bronze
Speed & Handiness	Alfonso von Marees on QR Pillan; Chile	Carlos Hernando Ramirez on Amazonas; Colombia	Andres Rodriguez on Da Vinci; Venezuela
Jumping individual	Andres Rodriguez on Da Vinci; Venezuela	Carlos Hernando Ramirez on Amazonas; Colombia	Alfonso von Marees on QR Pillan; Chile
Jumping overall	Carlos Hernando Ramirez on Amazonas; Colombia	Andres Rodriguez on Da Vinci; Venezuela	Rodrigo Krauss on Celesta; Colombia
Jumping team	Rodrigo Krauss on Celesta; Mario Andres Gamboa on Libertad; Carlos Hernando Ramirez on Amazonas; Nicolas Linares on Simonette; Colombia	Alfonso von Marees on QR Pillan; Agustin Toro on Prince Forlegato; Carlos Alberto Allende on AS Fe Grande; Carlos Alberto Picasso on Embrujo; Chile	Anselmo Alvarado on Jhon du Fliers; Giancarlo Genelli on Harlow; Andres Rodriguez on Da Vinci; Noel Enrique Vanososte on Benala; Venezuela
Dressage individual junior	Alejandro Gómez on Revenge; Venezuela	Bernal Raul Corchuelo on Highlander; Colombia	Eduardo Laverde on Libertino; Colombia
Dressage overall junior	Eduardo Laverde on Libertino; Colombia	Bernal Raul Corchuelo on Highlander; Colombia	Alejandro Gómez on Revenge; Venezuela
Dressage team junior	Bernal Raul Corchuelo on Highlander; Eduardo Laverde on Libertino; Diana Bermudez on Twister VDL; Cesar Bayona on Royal Copenhagen; Colombia	Carolina Navarro on Amadeo; Maria Jose de Guzman on Maximus; Franciska Pfletschinge on Toledano; Ivan Pasmiño on Lady Killer; Ecuador	Maria Waleska Arocha on Aristócrata; Alejandro Gómez on Revenge; Adriana Malaret on Sir Meister; Beatriz Torbay on Diskont; Venezuela
