= Water skiing at the 2010 South American Games =

- Venue: Club Campestre Llano grande
- Dates: March 20-25

Water skiing at the 2010 South American Games in Medellín was held from March 27 to March 30.

== Medal summary ==
=== Medal table ===
Rank	Nation	Gold	Silver	Bronze	Total
1	Argentina (ARG)	4	4	1	9
2	Chile (CHI)	3	1	2	6
3	Peru (PER)	1	2	0	3
4	Colombia (COL)	1	1	4	6
5	Brazil (BRA)	1	1	2	4
6	Ecuador (ECU)	0	1	1	2
Totals (6 entries)		10	10	10	30

== Men ==
Event	Gold	Silver	Bronze
Slalom	Javier Andres Julio; Argentina	Felipe Neves; Brazil	Rodrigo Andres Miranda Arellano; Chile
Figures	Javier Andres Julio; Argentina	Jorge Ignacio Renosto; Argentina	Roberto Linares Alvarez; Colombia
Jump	Rodrigo Miranda; Chile	Javier Andres Julio; Argentina	Esteban Siegert Castaneda; Colombia
Wakeboard	Marcelo Giardi; Brazil	Juan Martin; Argentina	Jamie Geovanny Bazan Perez; Ecuador
Overall	Javier Andres Julio; Argentina	Jorge Ignacio Renosto; Argentina	Esteban Siegert Castaneda; Colombia

== Women ==
Event	Gold	Silver	Bronze
Slalom	Maria Delfina Cuglievan Wiese; Peru	Angela Delgado Martinez; Colombia	Juliana Negrao; Brazil
Figures	Angela Delgado Martinez; Colombia	Nicole Andrea Naser Hizmeri; Chile	Lorena Botana; Argentina
Jump	Tiare Miranda Arellano; Chile	Maria Delfina Cuglievan Wiese; Peru	Pascale Dominique Ritter Van de Kamp; Chile
Wakeboard	Roberte Rendo; Argentina	Roberta Maria Lebed LLopart; Ecuador	Tereza Anastacia; Brazil
Overall	Tiare Miranda Arellano; Chile	Maria Delfina Cuglievan Wiese; Peru	Angela Delgado Martinez; Colombia
