= Gymnastics at the 1994 South American Games =

Gymnastics events were competed at the 1994 South American Games in Valencia, Venezuela, in November 1994.

== Medal summary ==
=== Medal table ===
Rank	Nation	Gold	Silver	Bronze	Total
1	Argentina (ARG)	17	15	1	33
2	Venezuela (VEN)	2	3	6	11
3	Colombia (COL)	1	1	3	5
4	Chile (CHI)	0	0	3	3
5	Bolivia (BOL)	0	0	1	1
Totals (5 entries)		20	19	14	53

=== Artistic gymnastics ===
Event	Gold	Silver	Bronze
Men
Team all-around	Argentina; Isidro Ibarrondo; Gustavo Pisos; Marcelo Palacio; Higinio de la Barrera; Fernando Menghi; Sebastián Alvarez	—	—
Individual all-around	Isidro Ibarrondo (ARG)	Gustavo Pisos (ARG)	Manuel Bejarano (VEN)
Floor exercise	Victor Solorzano (VEN)	Fernando Menghi (ARG)	Eric Saavedra (CHI)
Pommel horse	Alexander Rangel (COL)	Isidro Ibarrondo (ARG)	Leonardo González (COL)
Rings	Sergio Alvariño (ARG)	Isidro Ibarrondo (ARG)	Eric Saavedra (CHI)
Vault	Victor Solorzano (VEN)	Fernando Menghi (ARG)	Manuel Bejarano (VEN)
Parallel bars	Isidro Ibarrondo (ARG)	Sebastián Alvarez (ARG)	Manuel Bejarano (VEN)
Horizontal bar	Isidro Ibarrondo (ARG)	Manuel Bejarano (VEN)	Eric Saavedra (CHI)
Women
Team all-around	Argentina; Ana Paula Destéfano; Laura Alvarez; Ariadna Argoitia; Natalia Pérez Mendez; Analía Rodríguez; Romina Mazzoni	Venezuela; Deisy Escalona; Katty Pambiochi	Bolivia
Individual all-around	Ana Paula Destéfano (ARG)	Laura Alvarez (ARG)	Ariadna Argoitia (ARG)
Vault	Natalia Pérez Mendez (ARG)	Ana Paula Destéfano (ARG)	Deisy Escalona (VEN)
Uneven bars	Ana Paula Destéfano (ARG)	Natalia Pérez Mendez (ARG)	Deisy Escalona (VEN) Katty Pambiochi (VEN)
Balance beam	Laura Alvarez (ARG)	Ariadna Argoitia (ARG)	Mónica Vargas (COL)
Floor exercise	Laura Alvarez (ARG)	Xiomara Soler (COL)	Mónica Vargas (COL)

=== Rhythmic gymnastics ===
Event	Gold	Silver	Bronze
Individual all-around	Cecilia Schtutman (ARG)	Luciana Eslava (ARG)	—
Hoop	Alejandra Unsain (ARG)	Sandra Re (ARG)	—
Ball	Sandra Re (ARG)	Cecilia Schtutman (ARG)	—
Clubs	Sandra Re (ARG)	Cecilia Schtutman (ARG)	—
Ribbon	Cecilia Schtutman (ARG)	Luciana Eslava (ARG)	—
Rope	Cecilia Schtutman (ARG)	Adriana Abreu (VEN)	—
