= Water skiing at the 2014 South American Games =

- Dates: March 7-9

Water skiing at the 2014 South American Games in Santiago was held from March 7 to March 9.

== Medal summary ==
=== Medal table ===
Rank	Nation	Gold	Silver	Bronze	Total
1	Chile (CHI)	2	4	3	9
2	Peru (PER)	2	1	1	4
3	Argentina (ARG)	1	1	2	4
3	Colombia (COL)	1	1	2	4
5	Brazil (BRA)	1	1	0	2
6	Venezuela (VEN)	1	0	0	1
7	Ecuador (ECU)	0	0	1	1
Totals (7 entries)		8	8	9	25

== Men ==
Event	Gold	Silver	Bronze
Slalom	Nicholaas Walter Fuldauer; Brazil	Martin Malarczuk; Argentina	Santiago Robledo Mejia; Colombia
Figures	Santiago Robledo Mejia; Colombia	Rodrigo Andres Miranda Arellano; Chile	Jorge Ignacio Renosto; Argentina
Jump	Rodrigo Andres Miranda Arellano; Chile	Felipe Miranda; Chile	Santiago Correa Jaramillo; Colombia
Wakeboard	Juan Vicente Mendez; Venezuela	Juan Martin Velez Gutierrez; Colombia	Alejo de Palma; Argentina
Overall	Felipe Miranda; Chile	Rodrigo Andres Miranda Arellano; Chile	Santiago Correa Jaramillo; Colombia

== Women ==
Event	Gold	Silver	Bronze
Slalom	Maria Delfina Cuglievan Wiese; Peru	Fernanda Paz Naser Hizmeri; Chile	Valentina Gonzalez; Chile
Figures	Natalia Josefina Cuglievan Wiese; Peru	Fernanda Paz Naser Hizmeri; Chile	Valentina Gonzalez; Chile
Jump	Valentina Gonzalez; Chile	Maria Delfina Cuglievan Wiese; Peru	Fernanda Paz Naser Hizmeri; Chile
Wakeboard	Roberta Rendo; Argentina	Tereza Lobato Anastasia; Brazil	Vanessa Nabila Kronfle Catalan; Ecuador
Overall	Fernanda Paz Naser Hizmeri; Chile	Valentina Gonzalez; Chile	Maria Delfina Cuglievan Wiese; Peru
