= Gymnastics at the 1986 South American Games =

Gymnastics events were competed at the 1986 South American Games in Santiago, Chile.

== Medal summary ==
=== Medal table ===
Rank	Nation	Gold	Silver	Bronze	Total
1	Argentina (ARG)	11	7	7	25
2	Peru (PER)	2	4	2	8
3	Chile (CHI)	1	2	4	7
4	Ecuador (ECU)	0	1	1	2
Totals (4 entries)		14	14	14	42

=== Artistic gymnastics ===
==== Men ====
Event	Gold	Silver	Bronze
Team all-around	Argentina; Diego López; Walter Chaio; Andrés Jaichenko; Gustavo Zito; Martin González; Gabriel Bayeto	Peru; Anki Morosimato; Richard Peña	Ecuador; Guido Abarca
Individual all-around	Diego López (ARG)	Marcelo Toledo (CHI)	Walter Chaio (ARG)
Floor exercise	Martin González (ARG)	Guido Abarca (ECU)	Diego López (ARG)
Pommel horse	Marcelo Toledo (CHI)	Diego López (ARG)	Walter Chaio (ARG)
Rings	Andrés Jaichenko (ARG)	Marcelo Toledo (CHI)	Walter Chaio (ARG)
Vault	Gustavo Zito (ARG)	Anki Morosimato (PER)	Richard Peña (PER)
Parallel bars	Diego López (ARG)	Anki Morosimato (PER)	Marcelo Toledo (CHI)
Horizontal bar	Diego López (ARG)	Martin González (ARG)	Marcelo Toledo (CHI)

==== Women ====
Event	Gold	Silver	Bronze
Team all-around	Argentina; Gabriela Lobato; Mariana Alvariño; Cecilia Ibarrondo; Marina Magas; Mariana Falcioni; Jessica Altube	Peru; Ruby Smith; Carola Robles	Chile; Paola Peñaranda
Individual all-around	Gabriela Lobato (ARG)	Mariana Alvariño (ARG)	Cecilia Ibarrondo (ARG)
Vault	Mariana Alvariño (ARG)	Gabriela Lobato (ARG)	Ruby Smith (PER)
Uneven bars	Cecilia Ibarrondo (ARG)	Marina Magas (ARG)	Paola Peñaranda (CHI)
Balance beam	Carola Robles (PER)	Jessica Altube (ARG)	Cecilia Ibarrondo (ARG)
Floor exercise	Ruby Smith (PER)	Mariana Alvariño (ARG)	Gabriela Lobato (ARG)
