= Sailing at the 2022 South American Games =

Sailing competitions at the 2022 South American Games

- Venue: Playa San José, Encarnación
- Dates: October 2−6
- Nations: 10

Sailing competitions at the 2022 South American Games in Asunción, Paraguay were held between October 2 and 6, 2022 at the Playa San José, Encarnación

== Schedule ==
The competition schedule is as follows:

Number of day's racing	Preliminary day	Number of day's racing	Final day

Date Event	Sun 2	Mon 3	Tue 4	Wed 5	Thu 6
Men's laser radial		3	2		3
Men's sunfish	1	2	2		3
Men's IQFoil		4		1	7
Women's laser radial	2	1	2		3
Women's sunfish	1	2	2		3
Women's IQFoil		4		1	7
Mixed snipe	1	2	2	1	2

== Medal summary ==
=== Medal table ===
* Host nation (Paraguay)

Rank	Nation	Gold	Silver	Bronze	Total
1	Argentina	3	1	2	6
2	Peru	3	1	0	4
3	Chile	1	0	1	2
4	Uruguay	0	2	0	2
5	Brazil	0	1	4	5
6	Aruba	0	1	0	1
6	Colombia	0	1	0	1
Totals (7 entries)		7	7	7	21

=== Medalists ===
==== Men's events ====
Event	Gold	Silver	Bronze
Laser Standard (ILCA 7)	Stefano Peschiera; Peru	Francisco Guaragna Rigonat; Argentina	Felipe Fraquelli; Brazil
Sunfish	Jean Paul De Trazegnies; Peru	Simón Gómez; Colombia	Martín Alsogaray; Argentina
IQFoil 95	Francisco Saubidet; Argentina	Malik Hoveling; Aruba	Guilherme Plentz; Brazil

==== Women' events ====
Event	Gold	Silver	Bronze
Laser Radial (ILCA 6)	Luciana Cardozo; Argentina	Dolores Moreira; Uruguay	Isadora Dal Ri; Brazil
Sunfish	Constanza Olivares; Chile	Caterina Romero; Peru	Gabriella Kidd; Brazil
IQFoil 95	María Belén Bazo; Peru	Giovanna Prada; Brazil	Chiara Ferretti; Argentina

==== Mixed events ====
Event	Gold	Silver	Bronze
Snipe	Augusto Amato; Florencia Galimberti; Argentina	Carolina Rodríguez; Ricardo Fabini; Uruguay	Constanza Seguel; Matías Seguel; Chile

== Participation ==
Ten nations participated in sailing events of the 2022 South American Games.

- Argentina
- Aruba
- Brazil
- Chile
- Colombia
- Ecuador
- Paraguay
- Peru
- Uruguay
- Venezuela
