= Taekwondo at the 2010 South American Games =

Taekwondo competition

- Dates: March 27-29

Taekwondo at the 2010 South American Games. Competitions were held over March 27–29. All games were played at Coliseo de Combate.

== Medal summary ==
=== Medal table ===
Rank	Nation	Gold	Silver	Bronze	Total
1	Brazil (BRA)	7	5	3	15
2	Venezuela (VEN)	3	2	8	13
3	Colombia (COL)	2	3	4	9
4	Chile (CHI)	2	0	2	4
5	Argentina (ARG)	1	2	5	8
6	Peru (PER)	1	1	2	4
7	Ecuador (ECU)	0	2	2	4
8	Guyana (GUY)	0	1	0	1
9	Aruba (ARU)	0	0	1	1
9	Netherlands Antilles (AHO)	0	0	1	1
9	Panama (PAN)	0	0	1	1
9	Uruguay (URU)	0	0	1	1
Totals (12 entries)		16	16	30	62

== Men ==
Event	Gold	Silver	Bronze
Men's -54 kg	Federico Ferriol Laffouillere; Argentina	Harold Duvan Avella Patino; Colombia	Padro Gago; Venezuela; Reginaldo Santos; Brazil
Men's -58 kg	Mario Jose Leal; Venezuela	Marcio Ferreira; Brazil	Mauro Daniel Chrismanich; Argentina; Arnold Andres Torres Villablanca; Chile
Men's -63 kg	Hernan Villafane; Venezuela	Andre Almeida; Brazil	Mayko Votta; Uruguay; Kirk Causadias; Panama
Men's -68 kg	Peter Lopez Santos; Peru	Diogo Silva; Brazil	Danny Miranda; Venezuela; Sergio Dario Garcia Moreira; Ecuador
Men's -74 kg	Henrique Moura; Brazil	Sebastián Crismanich; Argentina	Javier Medina; Venezuela; Taino Cijntje; Netherlands Antilles
Men's -80 kg	Andre Bilia; Brazil	Andres Javier Caro Jahncke; Peru	Stuart Smit; Aruba; Carlos Mariano Causado Martinez; Colombia
Men's -87 kg	Douglas Marcelino; Brazil	Adrian Spellen; Guyana	Carlos Eduardo Liebig Sanguineti; Chile; Juan Carlos Diaz; Venezuela
Men's +87 kg	Leonardo Santos; Brazil	Jose Chacoa; Venezuela	Martin Leando Sio; Argentina; Sergio Andres Hoyos; Colombia

== Women ==
Event	Gold	Silver	Bronze
Women's -46 kg	Victoria Francesca Alvares Acuna; Chile	Katia Arakaki; Brazil	Katherine Gina Calderon Flores; Peru; Maria Jose Cueva Sola; Ecuador
Women's -49 kg	Fernanda Silva; Brazil	Monica Marcela Molina Olarte Cancino; Colombia	Katherin Reyes; Venezuela; Julissa Cristina Diez Canseco Verde; Peru
Women's -53 kg	Yeny Anyelina Contreras Loyola; Chile	Talisca Reis; Brazil	Daniel Domingues Montes; Colombia; Maria Florencia Fina; Argentina
Women's -57 kg	Doris Esmid Patino Morin; Colombia	Karina Elizabeth Andrade Lara; Ecuador	Aurora Millan; Venezuela; Debora Carla Hait; Argentina
Women's -62 kg	Adanys Corder; Venezuela	Karla Cristina Guerrero Intriago; Ecuador	Julia Santos; Brazil; Natali Goez Catano; Colombia
Women's -67 kg	Raphaella Pereira; Brazil	Lida Stella Hernandez Velandia; Colombia	Aura Paez; Venezuela; Gisel Elizabet Pogonza; Argentina
Women's -73 kg	Sandra Julieth Venegas Valderrama; Colombia	Natalia Forcada; Argentina	Rafaela Souza; Brazil; Daniela Brito; Venezuela
Women's +73 kg	Marrianne Hormann; Brazil	Teresa Guevara; Venezuela	
