= Softball at the 2010 South American Games =

- Dates: March 21–25

The women's Softball at the 2010 South American Games in Medellín was held from March 21 to March 25. All games were played at Oswaldo Osorio Rodríguez stadium. After the Page playoff system, Venezuela defeated Colombia 7-1 to win the tournament undefeated.

== Medal summary ==
=== Medal table ===
Rank	Nation	Gold	Silver	Bronze	Total
1	Venezuela (VEN)	1	0	0	1
2	Colombia (COL)	0	1	0	1
3	Argentina (ARG)	0	0	1	1
Totals (3 entries)		1	1	1	3

== Results ==
=== First round ===
March 21, 2010	Colombia	9 – 0	Peru

March 21, 2010	Venezuela	10 – 0	Argentina

March 21, 2010	Colombia	4 – 5	Argentina

March 21, 2010	Venezuela	10 – 0	Peru

March 22, 2010	Peru	2 – 11	Argentina

March 22, 2010	Peru	0 – 13	Colombia

March 22, 2010	Argentina	2 – 5	Venezuela

March 22, 2010	Venezuela	10 – 0	Colombia

March 23, 2010	Peru	0 – 15	Venezuela

March 23, 2010	Argentina	9 – 2	Peru

March 23, 2010	Argentina	2 – 1	Colombia

March 23, 2010	Colombia	0 – 2	Venezuela

=== Semifinals ===
March 24, 2010	Peru	0 – 5	Colombia

March 24, 2010	Venezuela	12 – 0	Argentina

=== Bronze Medal match ===
March 25, 2010	Argentina	1 – 7	Colombia

=== Gold Medal match ===
March 25, 2010	Venezuela	7 – 1	Colombia
