= 1994 South American Games =

Multi-sport event in Valencia, Venezuela

V South American Games
- 1994 South American Games logo
- Host city: Valencia
- Country: Venezuela
- Nations: 14
- Athletes: 1,599
- Events: 296 in 19 sports
- Opening: November 19, 1994
- Closing: November 28, 1994
- Opened by: Rafael Caldera
- Torch lighter: Ramón Volcán
- Main venue: Polideportivo Misael Delgado

The V South American Games (Spanish: Juegos Sudamericanos; Portuguese: Jogos Sul-Americanos) were a multi-sport event held in 1994 in Valencia, Carabobo, Venezuela, with some events in Puerto Cabello (boxing, judo, karate, wrestling) and Caracas (shooting). The Games were organized by the South American Sports Organization (ODESUR). An appraisal of the games and detailed medal lists were published elsewhere, emphasizing the results of the Argentinian teams.

Torch lighter at the Polideportivo Misael Delgado was local swimmer Ramón Volcán. Aruba, the Netherlands Antilles, and Panamá had their first appearance at the games, enhancing the number of participating nations to 14.

The games were initially awarded to Montevideo, Uruguay, but the local officials declined in 1992.

== Participants ==
14 ODESUR members participated on the games, Aruba, Netherlands Antilles and Panama Debuted on the games for the first time, Colombia previously did not participated because they participated the 1990 Central American and Caribbean Games.

- Argentina
- Aruba (Debut)
- Bolivia
- Brazil
- Chile
- Colombia
- Ecuador
- Netherlands Antilles (Debut)
- Panama (Debut)
- Paraguay
- Peru
- Suriname
- Uruguay
- Venezuela (Hosts)

== Medal count ==
The medal count for these Games is tabulated below. This table is sorted by the number of gold medals earned by each country. The number of silver medals is taken into consideration next, and then the number of bronze medals.

* Host nation (Venezuela)

Rank	Nation	Gold	Silver	Bronze	Total
1	Argentina (ARG)	105	61	52	218
2	Venezuela (VEN)*	76	65	65	206
3	Colombia (COL)	35	50	27	112
4	Brazil (BRA)	31	31	35	97
5	Chile (CHI)	16	20	37	73
6	Peru (PER)	15	27	33	75
7	Uruguay (URU)	4	8	9	21
8	Panama (PAN)	4	2	5	11
9	Netherlands Antilles (AHO)	3	5	5	13
10	Paraguay (PAR)	3	0	7	10
11	Ecuador (ECU)	2	17	19	38
12	Bolivia (BOL)	2	5	15	22
13	Suriname (SUR)	0	3	0	3
14	Aruba (ARU)	0	1	2	3
Totals (14 entries)		296	295	311	902

== Sports ==
- Aquatic sports
  - Swimming
- Athletics
- Baseball
- Bowling
- Boxing
- Canoeing
- Cycling
  - Road Cycling
  - Track Cycling
- Fencing
- Football
- Gymnastics
  - Artistic Gymnastics
  - Rhythmic Gymnastics
- Judo
- Karate
- Shooting
- Softball
- Table Tennis
- Taekwondo
- Tennis
- Weightlifting
- Wrestling
