= Triathlon at the 2010 South American Games =

There were 8 triathlon events at the 2010 South American Games.

== Medal summary ==
=== Medal table ===
Rank	Nation	Gold	Silver	Bronze	Total
1	Colombia (COL)	4	3	3	10
2	Chile (CHI)	2	1	1	4
3	Argentina (ARG)	1	2	0	3
4	Brazil (BRA)	1	1	1	3
5	Ecuador (ECU)	0	1	2	3
6	Venezuela (VEN)	0	0	1	1
Totals (6 entries)		8	8	8	24

=== Medalists ===
Event	Gold	Silver	Bronze
Men's events
Men's individual sprint	Jorge Luciano Farias; Argentina	Henrique Siqueira; Brazil	Oscar David Bohorques; Colombia
Men's team sprint	Oscar David Bohorques; Hernan Dario Valero; Ricardo Jose Restrepo; Colombia	Jorge Luciano Farias; Lautaro Sebriano; Gonzalo Tellechea; Argentina	Gabriel Jose Rojas; Alberto Urdaneta; Carlos Enrique Perez; Venezuela
Men's individual olympic distance	Diogo Martins; Brazil	Jorge Eduardo Suarez; Colombia	Oscar David Bohorques; Colombia
Men's team olympic distance	Jorge Eduardo Suarez; Oscar David Bohorques; Hernan Dario Valero; Colombia	Gonzalo Tellechea; Jorge Luciano Farias; Luciano Franco Taccone; Argentina	Diogo Martins; Henrique Sigueira; Bruno Matheus; Brazil
Women's events
Women's individual sprint	Barbara Catalina Diaz; Chile	Maria Carmenza Rendon; Colombia	Elizabeth Maria Iniguez; Ecuador
Women's team sprint	Maria Carmenza Rendon; Carolina Grimaldo Jimenez; Mayra Alejandra Vallejo; Colombia	Elizabeth Maria Iniguez; Diana Maria Montes; Karina Gabriela Duenas; Ecuador	Barbara Catalina Diaz; Favia Alejandra Fuentes; Pamela Veron de Lecco; Chile
Women's individual olympic distance	Barbara Catalina Diaz; Chile	Maria Carmenza Rendon; Colombia	Carolina Grimaldo Jimenez; Colombia
Women's team olympic distance	Maria Carmenza Rendon; Carolina Grimaldo Jimenez; Mayra Alejandra Vallejo; Colombia	Barbara Catalina Diaz; Andrea Nicole Contreras; Favia Alejandra Fuentes; Chile	Elizabeth Maria Iniguez; Diana Maria Montes; Karina Gabriela Duenas; Ecuador
