= 2010 South American Games =

Multi-sport event in Medellin, Colombia

IX South American Games
- The official logo of the Medellín 2010 South American Games.
- Host city: Medellín
- Country: Colombia
- Nations: 15 NOCs
- Athletes: 3,751
- Events: 486 in 42 sports
- Opening: March 19, 2010
- Closing: March 30, 2010
- Opened by: Álvaro Uribe Vélez
- Main venue: Estadio Atanasio Girardot

The IX South American Games (Spanish: Juegos Sudamericanos; Portuguese: Jogos Sul-Americanos) was a multi-sport event held between 19 and 30 March 2010 in Medellín, Colombia. The Games were organized by the South American Sports Organization (ODESUR), who awarded the Games to the city with 8 votes over the bid by previous host Santiago, Chile (6 votes).

== Participating nations ==
15 ODESUR members participated on the games with total of 3,751 athletes, this is the last participation of Netherlands Antilles before the dissolution of their country

- Argentina
- Aruba
- Bolivia
- Brazil
- Chile
- Colombia (hosts)
- Ecuador
- Guyana
- Netherlands Antilles
- Panama
- Paraguay
- Peru
- Suriname
- Uruguay
- Venezuela

== Medal count ==
The medal count for these games is tabulated below. This table is sorted by the number of gold medals earned by each country. The number of silver medals is taken into consideration next, and then the number of bronze medals.

* Host nation (Colombia)

Rank	Nation	Gold	Silver	Bronze	Total
1	Colombia (COL)*	144	124	104	372
2	Brazil (BRA)	133	119	103	355
3	Venezuela (VEN)	89	77	97	263
4	Argentina (ARG)	54	76	107	237
5	Chile (CHI)	25	32	52	109
6	Peru (PER)	19	19	33	71
7	Ecuador (ECU)	16	21	57	94
8	Bolivia (BOL)	2	1	8	11
9	Uruguay (URU)	1	8	4	13
10	Paraguay (PAR)	1	7	4	12
11	Guyana (GUY)	1	1	2	4
12	Netherlands Antilles (AHO)	1	0	3	4
13	Aruba (ARU)	0	0	2	2
13	Panama (PAN)	0	0	2	2
13	Suriname (SUR)	0	0	2	2
Totals (15 entries)		486	485	580	1,551

== Sports ==
- Archery (28)
- Athletics (44)
- Badminton (6)
- Baseball (1)
- Basketball (2)
- Beach volleyball (2)
- Bowling (15)
- Boxing (14)
- Canoeing (24)
- Cycling (28)
- Diving (9)
- Equestrian (7)
- Fencing (12)
- Football (1)
- Futsal (1)
- Gymnastics (23)
- Handball (2)
- Judo (22)
- Karate (18)
- Roller skating (32)
- Rowing (14)
- Sailing (6)
- Shooting (34)
- Softball (1)
- Squash (7)
- Swimming (44)
- Synchronized swimming (3)
- Table tennis (7)
- Taekwondo (16)
- Tennis (5)
- Triathlon (8)
- Volleyball (2)
- Water polo (2)
- Waterskiing (10)
- Weightlifting (15)
- Wrestling (20)

== See also ==
- 2010 South American Games opening ceremony
