= 2010 Fed Cup Americas Zone Group I – play-offs =

Tennis competition play-offs

The play-offs of the 2010 Fed Cup Americas Zone Group I were the final stages of the Group I Zonal Competition involving teams from the Americas. Using the positions determined in their pools, the eight teams faced off to determine their placing in the 2010 Fed Cup Americas Zone Group I, the top countries of each pool played for first to second, while the bottom two of each pool competed for fifth to eighth. The top team advanced to World Group II play-offs, and the bottom two teams were relegated down to the Americas Zone Group II for the next year.

| Placing | Pool A | Pool B |
|---|---|---|
| 1 | Canada | Colombia |
| 2 | Brazil | Paraguay |
| 3 | Puerto Rico | Chile |
| 4 | Cuba | Bolivia |

== Promotion play-offs ==
The first placed teams of each pool were placed against each other in a head-to-head round. The winner of the rounds advanced to the World Group II play-offs, where they would get a chance to advance to the World Group II for next year.

=== Canada vs. Colombia ===
Canada
2
Yacht y Golf Club Paraguayo, Lambaré, Paraguay
6 February 2010
Red clay (outdoors)

Colombia
0

| | | | 1 | 2 | 3 |
|---|---|---|---|---|---|---|
| 1 | (Canada) (Colombia) | Sharon Fichman; Catalina Castaño | 6; 2 | 6; 3 |
| 2 | (Canada) (Colombia) | Aleksandra Wozniak; Mariana Duque Mariño | 6; 2 | 6; 1 |
| 3 | (Canada) (Colombia) | Sharon Fichman / Marie-Ève Pelletier; Karen Castiblanco / Mariana Duque Mariño | | | | not played |

== Third to Fourth play-off ==
The second placed teams of each pool were placed against each other in a tie. The winner of the tie was allocated third place in the Group while the loser was allocated fourth.

=== Brazil vs. Paraguay ===
Brazil
0
Yacht y Golf Club Paraguayo, Lambaré, Paraguay
6 February 2010
Red clay (outdoors)

Paraguay
2

| | | | 1 | 2 | 3 |
|---|---|---|---|---|---|---|
| 1 | (Brazil) (Paraguay) | Ana-Clara Duarte; Isaura Enrique Aguilar | 6; 0 | 5; 7 | 0; 6 |
| 2 | (Brazil) (Paraguay) | Maria Fernanda Alves; Verónica Cepede Royg | 6; 1 | 4; 6 | 3; 6 |
| 3 | (Brazil) (Paraguay) | Monique Albuquerque / Roxane Vaisemberg; Isaura Enrique Aguilar / Isabella Robbiani | | | | not played |

== Relegation play-offs ==
The last and second-to-last placed teams of each pool were placed against each other in two head-to-head rounds. The losing team of the rounds were relegated to Group II for next year.

=== Puerto Rico vs. Bolivia ===
Puerto Rico
1
Yacht y Golf Club Paraguayo, Lambaré, Paraguay
6 February 2010
Red clay (outdoors)

Bolivia
2

| | | | 1 | 2 | 3 |
|---|---|---|---|---|---|
| 1 | (Puerto Rico) (Bolivia) | Monica Puig; María Paula Deheza | 6; 2 | 6^{5} 7^{7} | 6; 3 |
| 2 | (Puerto Rico) (Bolivia) | Jessica Roland-Rosario; María Fernanda Álvarez Terán | 2; 6 | 0; 6 |
| 3 | (Puerto Rico) (Bolivia) | Monica Puig / Jessica Roland-Rosario; María Fernanda Álvarez Terán / María Paula Deheza | 4; 6 | 0; 6 |

=== Cuba vs. Chile ===
Cuba
0
Yacht y Golf Club Paraguayo, Lambaré, Paraguay
6 February 2010
Red clay (outdoors)

Chile
3

| | | | 1 | 2 | 3 |
|---|---|---|---|---|---|
| 1 | (Cuba) (Chile) | Misleydis Díaz González; Cecilia Costa Melgar | 3; 6 | 1; 6 |
| 2 | (Cuba) (Chile) | Yamile Fors Guerra; Andrea Koch-Benvenuto | 1; 6 | 7^{7} 6^{5} | 2; 6 |
| 3 | (Cuba) (Chile) | Lumay Díaz Hernández / Yamile Fors Guerra; Daniela Seguel / Camila Silva | 3; 6 | 4; 6 |

== Final Placements ==
| Placing | Teams |
| Promoted | Canada |
| Second | Colombia |
| Third | Paraguay |
| Fourth | Brazil |
| Fifth | Bolivia |
| Fifth | Chile |
| Relegated | Puerto Rico |
| Relegated | Cuba |

- Canada advanced to the World Group II play-offs, and were drawn against Argentina, where they won 5–0. The team thus advanced to World Group II for the next year.
- Puerto Rico and Cuba were relegated down to Americas Zone Group II for the next year. The Puerto Ricans placed sixth overall, while the Cubans did not compete.

== See also ==
- Fed Cup structure
