= 2010 Fed Cup Americas Zone =

Subsection of tennis competition

The Americas Zone was one of three zones of regional competition in the 2010 Fed Cup.

== Group I ==
- Venue: Yacht y Golf Club Paraguayo, Lambaré, Paraguay (outdoor clay)
- Date: 3–6 February

The eight teams were divided into two pools of four teams. The teams that finished first in the pools played-off to determine which team would partake in the World Group II Play-offs. The four nations coming last or second-to-last in the pools also played-off to determine which would be relegated to Group II for 2011.

=== Pools ===
	Pool A	CAN	BRA	PUR	CUB
1	Canada (3–0)		2–1	3–0	3–0
2	Brazil (2–1)	1–2		3–0	3–0
3	Puerto Rico (1–2)	0–3	0–3		2–1
4	Cuba (0–3)	0–3	0–3	1–2	

	Pool B	COL	PAR	CHI	BOL
1	Colombia (3–0)		2–1	2–1	3–0
2	Paraguay (2–1)	1–2		2–1	3–0
3	Chile (1–2)	1–2	1–2		2–1
4	Bolivia (0–3)	0–3	0–3	1–2	

=== Play-offs ===
Placing	A Team	Score	B Team
Promotion	Canada	2–0	Colombia
3rd–4th	Brazil	0–2	Paraguay
Relegation	Puerto Rico	1–2	Bolivia
Relegation	Cuba	0–3	Chile

- Canada advanced to 2010 World Group II Play-offs.
- Puerto Rico and Cuba was relegated to Group II for 2011.

== Group II ==
- Venue: National Tennis Club, Guayaquil, Ecuador (outdoor clay)
- Date: 19–24 April

The ten teams were divided into two pools of five teams. The teams that finished first and second in the pools played-off to determine which team would progress to the Group I.

=== Pools ===
	Pool A	ECU	BAH	CRC	PAN	DOM
1	Ecuador (4–0)		3–0	3–0	3–0	3–0
2	Bahamas (3–1)	0–3		2–1	3–0	3–0
3	Costa Rica (2–2)	0–3	1–2		3–0	2–1
4	Trinidad and Tobago (1–3)	0–3	0–3	0–3		3–0
5	Dominican Republic (0–4)	0–3	0–3	1–2	0–3	

	Pool B	PER	MEX	GUA	BER	PAN
1	Peru (4–0)		2–1	3–0	3–0	3–0
2	Mexico (3–1)	1–2		3–0	3–0	3–0
3	Guatemala (2–2)	0–3	0–3		3–0	3–0
4	Bermuda (1–3)	0–3	0–3	0–3		2–1
5	Panama (0–4)	0–3	0–3	0–3	1–2	

=== Play-offs ===
Placing	A Team	Score	B Team
Promotion	Ecuador	1–2	Mexico
Promotion	Bahamas	1–2	Peru
5th–6th	Costa Rica	1–2	Guatemala
7th–8th	Trinidad and Tobago	3–0	Bermuda
9th–10th	Dominican Republic	0–3	Panama

- Mexico and Peru advanced to Group I for 2011.

== See also ==
- Fed Cup structure
