= Tennis at the 2010 South American Games – Women's singles =

Women's singles
- Tennis at the 2010 South American Games

Events
Singles	men	women
Doubles	men	women
- South American Games

The women's singles event at the 2010 South American Games was held on 22–28 March.

Chilean Cecilia Costa Melgar won the gold medal.

== Medalists ==
Gold	Silver	Bronze
Cecilia Costa Melgar; Chile	Verónica Cepede Royg; Paraguay	Fernanda Reyes; Chile

== Draw ==
Key

- Q = Qualifier
- WC = Wild card
- LL = Lucky loser
- Alt = Alternate
- ITF = ITF entry
- PR = Protected ranking
- SR = Special ranking
- SE = Special exempt
- JE = Junior exempt
- JR = Junior Accelerator Programme entrant
- CO = College Accelerator Programme entrant
- NG = Next Gen Accelerator Program entrant
- w/o = Walkover
- r = Retired
- d = Defaulted

=== Finals ===
Semifinals
1	Verónica Cepede Royg (PAR)	6	6
6	Fernanda Reyes (CHI)	3	4
4	Cecilia Costa Melgar (CHI)	6	6
2	Adriana Pérez (VEN)	4	3

Final
1	Verónica Cepede Royg (PAR)	3	6
4	Cecilia Costa Melgar (CHI)	6	7
Bronze medal match
6	Fernanda Reyes (CHI)	6	6
2	Adriana Pérez (VEN)	1	2

=== Top half ===
First round
N Montufar (ECU)	6	6
A Wijngaarde (SUR)	2	0
S Flores (COL)	1	3
FÁ Paz (PER)	6	6
N Zeballos (BOL)	0	2
5	A Gámiz (VEN)	6	6
P Kú Flores (PER)	1	7	6
N Gasser (BOL)	6	6	4
L Pigossi (BRA)	1	1
MC Arenas (COL)	6	6
MA Rovira (ECU)	1	2
6	F Reyes (CHI)	6	6

Second round
1	V Cepede Royg (PAR)	6	6
N Montufar (ECU)	2	4
FÁ Paz (PER)	1	5
5	A Gámiz (VEN)	6	7
3	A Eskenazi (ARG)	3	6	2
P Kú Flores (PER)	6	3	6
MC Arenas (COL)	1	2
6	F Reyes (CHI)	6	6

Quarterfinals
1	V Cepede Royg (PAR)	7	6
5	A Gámiz (VEN)	6	3
P Kú Flores (PER)	2	0
6	F Reyes (CHI)	6	6

Semifinals
1	V Cepede Royg (PAR)	6	6
6	F Reyes (CHI)	3	4

=== Bottom half ===
First round
7	P Ormaechea (ARG)	6	6
D Vidal (VEN)	0	2
Y Lizarazo (COL)	3	6	6
X Siles Luna (PER)	6	2	2
I Robbiani (PAR)	5	6
M Belén Pérez (BOL)	7	7
C Sansonetti (URU)	2	1
4	C Costa Melgar (CHI)	6	6
8	D Seguel (CHI)	6	6
C Manzi (COL)	3	3
N Kurata (BRA)	3	3
C Pella (ARG)	6	6
D González (ECU)	7	7
I Aguilar (PAR)	5	6

Second round
7	P Ormaechea (ARG)	6	6
Y Lizarazo (COL)	3	3
M Belén Pérez (BOL)	6	0
4	C Costa Melgar (CHI)	7	6
8	D Seguel (CHI)	5	3
C Pella (ARG)	7	6
D González (ECU)	2	r
2	A Pérez (VEN)	6

Quarterfinals
7	P Ormaechea (ARG)	4	3
4	C Costa Melgar (CHI)	6	6
C Pella (ARG)	6	3	2
2	A Pérez (VEN)	4	6	6

Semifinals
4	C Costa Melgar (CHI)	6	6
2	A Pérez (VEN)	4	3
