= Tennis at the 2010 South American Games – Men's doubles =

Men's doubles
- Tennis at the 2010 South American Games

Events
Singles	men	women
Doubles	men	women
- South American Games

The men's doubles event at the 2010 South American Games was held over March 24–27.

The gold medal was won by the Ecuadorian pair of Diego Hidalgo and Roberto Quiroz.

== Medalists ==
Gold	Silver	Bronze
Diego Hidalgo; Roberto Quiroz; Ecuador	Facundo Arguello; Agustín Velotti; Argentina	Alejandro Arias Justiniano; Bruno del Granado Barrancos; Bolivia

== Draw ==
Key

- Q = Qualifier
- WC = Wild card
- LL = Lucky loser
- Alt = Alternate
- ITF = ITF entry
- PR = Protected ranking
- SR = Special ranking
- SE = Special exempt
- JE = Junior exempt
- JR = Junior Accelerator Programme entrant
- CO = College Accelerator Programme entrant
- NG = Next Gen Accelerator Program entrant
- w/o = Walkover
- r = Retired
- d = Defaulted

=== Finals ===
Semifinals
1	Facundo Arguello (ARG); Agustín Velotti (ARG)	7^{7}	6^{9}	7^{7}
4	Duilio Beretta (PER); Sergio Galdós (PER)	6^{3}	7^{11}	6^{5}
3	Diego Hidalgo (ECU); Roberto Quiroz (ECU)	6	7
Alejandro Justiniano (BOL); Bruno Barrancos (BOL)	1	6

Final
1	Facundo Arguello (ARG); Agustín Velotti (ARG)	7	6	4
3	Diego Hidalgo (ECU); Roberto Quiroz (ECU)	5	7	6
Bronze medal match
4	Duilio Beretta (PER); Sergio Galdós (PER)	6	3	6
Alejandro Justiniano (BOL); Bruno Barrancos (BOL)	4	6	7

=== Top half ===
First round
Cristian Chavez (COL); Tomas Bulles (COL)	0	4
Felipe Ríos (CHI); Benjamin Gallegos (CHI)	6	6

Quarterfinals
1	Facundo Arguello (ARG); Agustín Velotti (ARG)	6	6
Juan Antonio Martínez (PAR); Francisco Kim (PAR)	4	3
4	D Beretta (PER); S Galdós (PER)	6	6
F Ríos (CHI); B Gallegos (CHI)	4	4

Semifinals
1	F Arguello (ARG); A Velotti (ARG)	7^{7}	6^{9}	7^{7}
4	D Beretta (PER); S Galdós (PER)	6^{3}	7^{11}	6^{5}

=== Bottom half ===
First round
Juan Ceballos (VEN); Ricardo Rodríguez (VEN)	6	4	6
Guilherme Clezar (BRA); Thiago Monteiro (BRA)	4	6	0
Alejandro Justiniano (BOL); Bruno Barrancos (BOL)	6^{4}	6	7^{7}
Martín Cuevas (URU); Rodrigo Senattore (URU)	7^{7}	3	6^{5}

Quarterfinals
J Ceballos (VEN); R Rodríguez (VEN)	6	3	3
3	Diego Hidalgo (ECU); Roberto Quiroz (ECU)	3	6	6
A Justiniano (BOL); B Barrancos (BOL)	7	6
2	Juan Sebastián Gómez (COL); Sebastián López (COL)	6	3

Semifinals
3	D Hidalgo (ECU); R Quiroz (ECU)	6	7
A Justiniano (BOL); B Barrancos (BOL)	1	6
