= 2010 Fed Cup Americas Zone Group I – Pool A =

International tennis competition

Group A of the 2010 Fed Cup Americas Zone Group I was one of two pools in the Americas Zone Group I of the 2010 Fed Cup. Four teams competed in a round robin competition, with the top team and the bottom two teams proceeding to their respective sections of the play-offs: the top teams played for advancement to the World Group II Play-offs, while the bottom teams faced potential relegation to Group II.

		(Canada) CAN	(Brazil) BRA	(Puerto Rico) PUR	(Cuba) CUB	RR; W–L	Set; W–L	Game; W–L	Standings
19	Canada		2–1	3–0	3–0	3–0	17–2	110–22	1
34	Brazil	1–2		3–0	3–0	2–1	14–5	97–62	2
35	Puerto Rico	0–3	0–3		2–1	1–2	4–14	52–91	3
52	Cuba	0–3	0–3	1–2		0–3	2–16	40–99	4

== Canada vs. Cuba ==
Canada
3
Yacht y Golf Club Paraguayo, Lambaré, Paraguay
3 February 2010
Red clay (outdoors)

Cuba
0

			1	2	3
1	(Canada) (Cuba)	Sharon Fichman; Misleydis Díaz González	6; 2	6; 1
2	(Canada) (Cuba)	Aleksandra Wozniak; Yamile Fors Guerra	6; 3	6; 3
3	(Canada) (Cuba)	Marie-Ève Pelletier / Aleksandra Wozniak; Lumay Díaz Hernández / Yamile Fors Guerra	6; 1	6; 0

== Brazil vs. Puerto Rico ==
Brazil
3
Yacht y Golf Club Paraguayo, Lambaré, Paraguay
3 February 2010
Red clay (outdoors)

Puerto Rico
0

			1	2	3
1	(Brazil) (Puerto Rico)	Ana-Clara Duarte; Monica Puig	6; 3	6; 1
2	(Brazil) (Puerto Rico)	Maria Fernanda Alves; Jessica Roland-Rosario	6; 3	6; 2
3	(Brazil) (Puerto Rico)	Monique Albuquerque / Roxane Vaisemberg; Rocío Portela / Gabriela Vásquez	6; 2	6; 2

== Canada vs. Puerto Rico ==
Canada
3
Yacht y Golf Club Paraguayo, Lambaré, Paraguay
4 February 2010
Red clay (outdoors)

Puerto Rico
0

			1	2	3
1	(Canada) (Puerto Rico)	Sharon Fichman; Monica Puig	6; 2	7; 5
2	(Canada) (Puerto Rico)	Aleksandra Wozniak; Jessica Roland-Rosario	6; 2	6; 2
3	(Canada) (Puerto Rico)	Sharon Fichman / Marie-Ève Pelletier; Rocío Portela / Gabriela Vásquez	6; 0	6; 1

== Brazil vs. Cuba ==
Brazil
3
Yacht y Golf Club Paraguayo, Lambaré, Paraguay
4 February 2010
Red clay (outdoors)

Cuba
0

			1	2	3
1	(Brazil) (Cuba)	Ana-Clara Duarte; Lumay Díaz Hernández	6; 3	6; 0
2	(Brazil) (Cuba)	Maria Fernanda Alves; Misleydis Díaz González	6; 1	6; 3
3	(Brazil) (Cuba)	Monique Albuquerque / Roxane Vaisemberg; Lumay Díaz Hernández / Yamile Fors Guerra	6; 2	6; 3

== Canada vs. Brazil ==
Canada
2
Yacht y Golf Club Paraguayo, Lambaré, Paraguay
5 February 2010
Red clay (outdoors)

Brazil
1

			1	2	3
1	(Canada) (Brazil)	Sharon Fichman; Ana-Clara Duarte	7; 5	6; 1
2	(Canada) (Brazil)	Aleksandra Wozniak; Maria Fernanda Alves	6; 4	4; 6	2; 6
3	(Canada) (Brazil)	Sharon Fichman / Marie-Ève Pelletier; Monique Albuquerque / Roxane Vaisemberg	6; 2	6; 1

== Puerto Rico vs. Cuba ==
Puerto Rico
2
Yacht y Golf Club Paraguayo, Lambaré, Paraguay
5 February 2010
Red clay (outdoors)

Cuba
1

			1	2	3
1	(Puerto Rico) (Cuba)	Monica Puig; Misleydis Díaz González	6; 1	6; 0
2	(Puerto Rico) (Cuba)	Jessica Roland-Rosario; Yamile Fors Guerra	3; 6	0; 6
3	(Puerto Rico) (Cuba)	Monica Puig / Jessica Roland-Rosario; Lumay Díaz Hernández / Yamile Fors Guerra	6; 1	6; 4

== See also ==
- Fed Cup structure
