= Tennis at the 2010 South American Games – Women's doubles =

Women's doubles
- Tennis at the 2010 South American Games

Events
Singles	men	women
Doubles	men	women
- South American Games

The women's doubles event at the 2010 South American Games was held on 24–27 March.

The gold medal was won by the Chilean pair of Fernanda Brito and Cecilia Costa Melgar.

== Medalists ==
Gold	Silver	Bronze
Fernanda Brito; Cecilia Costa Melgar; Chile	Andrea Gámiz; Adriana Pérez; Venezuela	Agustina Eskenazi; Catalina Pella; Argentina

== Draw ==
=== Finals ===
Semifinals
1	Andrea Gámiz (VEN); Adriana Pérez (VEN)	6	6
3	Agustina Eskenazi (ARG); Catalina Pella (ARG)	4	2
4	Verónica Cepede Royg (PAR); Isabella Robbiani (PAR)	2	4
2	Fernanda Brito (CHI); Cecilia Costa Melgar (CHI)	6	6

Final
1	Andrea Gámiz (VEN); Adriana Pérez (VEN)	3	3
2	Fernanda Brito (CHI); Cecilia Costa Melgar (CHI)	6	6
Bronze medal match
3	Agustina Eskenazi (ARG); Catalina Pella (ARG)	7	7
4	Verónica Cepede Royg (PAR); Isabella Robbiani (PAR)	5	6

=== Top half ===
First round				Quarterfinals				Semifinals
				1	A Gámiz (VEN); A Pérez (VEN)	7	7
D González (ECU); N Montufar (ECU)	1	7	0		MC Arenas (COL); Y Lizarazo (COL)	5	5
MC Arenas (COL); Y Lizarazo (COL)	6	6	6					1	A Gamiz (VEN); A Pérez (VEN)	6	6
								3	A Eskenazi (ARG); C Pella (ARG)	4	2
				3	A Eskenazi (ARG); C Pella (ARG)	6	7
					N Gasser (BOL); N Zeballos (BOL)	1	6

=== Bottom half ===
First round
C Manzi (COL); S Flores (COL)	4	2
P Kú Flores (PER); X Siles Luna (PER)	6	6

Quarterfinals
P Kú Flores (PER); X Siles Luna (PER)	2	2
4	V Cepede Royg (PAR); I Robbiani (PAR)	6	6
L Pigossi (BRA); N Kurata (BRA)	3	4
2	F Brito (CHI); C Costa Melgar (CHI)	6	6

Semifinals
4	V Cepede Royg (PAR); I Robbiani (PAR)	2	4
2	F Brito (CHI); C Costa Melgar (CHI)	6	6
