= 2010 Fed Cup Americas Zone Group I – Pool B =

International tennis competition

Group B of the 2010 Fed Cup Americas Zone Group I was one of two pools in the Americas Zone Group I of the 2010 Fed Cup. Four teams competed in a round robin competition, with the top team and the bottom two teams proceeding to their respective sections of the play-offs: the top teams played for advancement to the World Group II Play-offs, while the bottom teams faced potential relegation to Group II.

		(Colombia) COL	(Paraguay) PAR	(Chile) CHI	(Bolivia) BOL	RR; W–L	Set; W–L	Game; W–L	Standings
23	Colombia		2–1	2–1	3–0	3–0	14–5	99–74	1
28	Paraguay	1–2		2–1	3–0	2–1	13–7	106–70	2
47	Chile	1–2	1–2		2–1	1–2	8–10	76–93	3
49	Bolivia	0–3	0–3	1–2		0–3	3–16	69–113	4

== Colombia vs. Bolivia ==
Colombia
3
Yacht y Golf Club Paraguayo, Lambaré, Paraguay
3 February 2010
Red clay (outdoors)

Bolivia
0

			1	2	3
1	(Colombia) (Bolivia)	Catalina Castaño; María Paula Deheza	6; 3	6; 2
2	(Colombia) (Bolivia)	Mariana Duque Mariño; María Fernanda Álvarez Terán	6; 3	6; 2
3	(Colombia) (Bolivia)	Karen Castiblanco / Paula Zabala; María Fernanda Álvarez Terán / María Paula Deheza	6; 3	7^{9} 6^{7}

== Paraguay vs. Chile ==
Paraguay
2
Yacht y Golf Club Paraguayo, Lambaré, Paraguay
3 February 2010
Red clay (outdoors)

Chile
1

			1	2	3
1	(Paraguay) (Chile)	Verónica Cepede Royg; Camila Silva	6; 1	6; 2
2	(Paraguay) (Chile)	Rossana de los Ríos; Andrea Koch-Benvenuto	6; 0	6; 2
3	(Paraguay) (Chile)	Isaura Enrique Aguilar / Isabella Robbiani; Cecilia Costa Melgar / Andrea Koch-Benvenuto	4; 6	5; 7

== Colombia vs. Chile ==
Colombia
2
Yacht y Golf Club Paraguayo, Lambaré, Paraguay
4 February 2010
Red clay (outdoors)

Chile
1

			1	2	3
1	(Colombia) (Chile)	Catalina Castaño; Cecilia Costa Melgar	1; 6	3; 6
2	(Colombia) (Chile)	Mariana Duque Mariño; Andrea Koch-Benvenuto	6; 2	6; 2
3	(Colombia) (Chile)	Karen Castiblanco / Mariana Duque Mariño; Andrea Koch-Benvenuto / Camila Silva	7^{14} 6^{12}	6; 2

== Paraguay vs. Bolivia ==
Paraguay
3
Yacht y Golf Club Paraguayo, Lambaré, Paraguay
4 February 2010
Red clay (outdoors)

Bolivia
0

			1	2	3
1	(Paraguay) (Bolivia)	Verónica Cepede Royg; María Paula Deheza	6; 3	6; 1
2	(Paraguay) (Bolivia)	Rossana de los Ríos; María Fernanda Álvarez Terán	6; 3	6^{2} 7^{7}	6; 3
3	(Paraguay) (Bolivia)	Isaura Enrique Aguilar / Isabella Robbiani; María Inés Deheza / Belén Rivera	6; 2	6; 0

== Colombia vs. Paraguay ==
Colombia
2
Yacht y Golf Club Paraguayo, Lambaré, Paraguay
5 February 2010
Red clay (outdoors)

Paraguay
1

			1	2	3
1	(Colombia) (Paraguay)	Karen Castiblanco; Verónica Cepede Royg	2; 6	1; 6
2	(Colombia) (Paraguay)	Mariana Duque Mariño; Rossana de los Ríos	6; 3	6^{4} 7^{7}	6; 1
3	(Colombia) (Paraguay)	Karen Castiblanco / Mariana Duque Mariño; Verónica Cepede Royg / Rossana de los Ríos	6; 4	6; 4

== Chile vs. Bolivia ==
Chile
2
Yacht y Golf Club Paraguayo, Lambaré, Paraguay
5 February 2010
Red clay (outdoors)

Bolivia
1

			1	2	3
1	(Chile) (Bolivia)	Cecilia Costa Melgar; María Paula Deheza	7; 5	7; 5
2	(Chile) (Bolivia)	Andrea Koch-Benvenuto; María Fernanda Álvarez Terán	7^{7} 6^{0}	6; 2
3	(Chile) (Bolivia)	Daniela Seguel / Camila Silva; María Inés Deheza / María Paula Deheza	1; 6	6^{2} 7^{7}

== See also ==
- Fed Cup structure
