= 2010 South American Games opening ceremony =

Opening ceremony of the 2010 South American Games in Medellín, Colombia

- Part of 2010 South American Games
- Date: 19 March 2010 – 30 March 2010
- Location: Atanasio Girardot Stadium, Medellín, Colombia; 6.2568°N 75.590172°W

The IX South American Games of 2010 were held in the city of Medellín, Colombia, between 19 March and 30 March. The opening ceremony was designed to be held at the Atanasio Girardot Stadium in Atanasio Girardot Sports Unit, on Friday, 19 March 2010, 19:00 (UTC –5 GMT).

The event was attended by 4,500 athletes and 41,000 spectators (17,000 through tickets donated by the Mayor's Office, 19,000 through tickets sold to the public, and 5,000 among delegates and protocol staff). The presentation was presided over by: Álvaro Uribe Vélez, President of Colombia; Carlos Arthur Nuzman, president of the South American Sports Organization; Alicia Eugenia Vargas Restrepo, director of the Games; Alonso Salazar, mayor of Medellín; Luis Alfredo Ramos, governor of Antioquia; and Thomas Bach, vice-president of the International Olympic Committee.

== Design ==
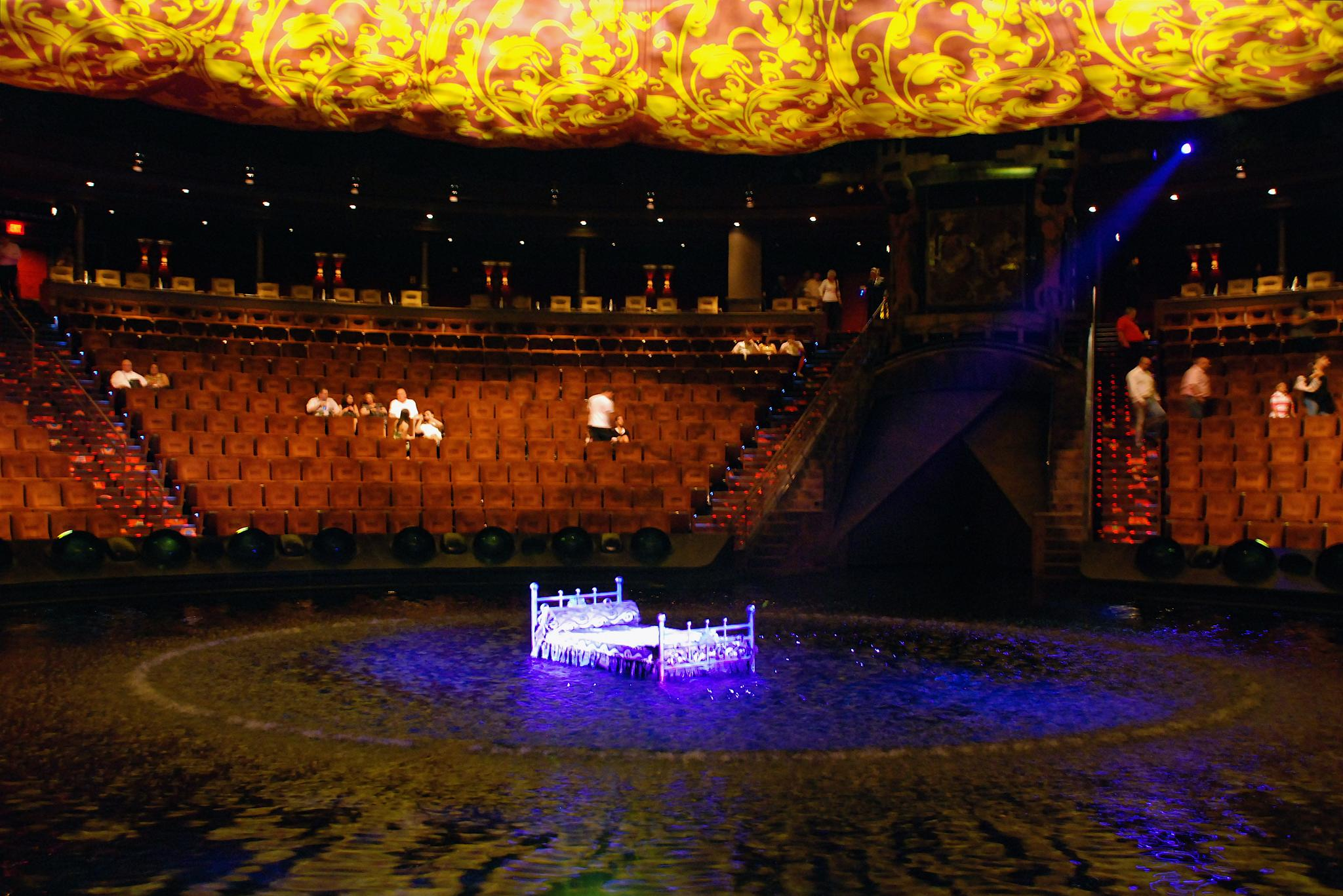
Franco Dragone staged the show of the Le Rêve theatre at the Wynn in Las Vegas

The staging and design of the opening act was the responsibility of the company "CultureFit". Franco Dragone, a former director of Cirque du Soleil and known for staging major performing-arts productions in Las Vegas, was the designer of the ceremony. For the staging, more than 100 specialists came to the country from abroad.

The ceremony featured 700 artists, including actors, acrobats, dancers, and specialists in local street art, who wore 40 locally made costume designs. Rehearsals began seven months in advance to put on a high-quality, well-coordinated show.

Genari Magrans, director of Culture Fit, said before the ceremony that it would be on a par with the world's biggest sporting events and full of surprises. He said it would consist of eleven acts and focus on the history of Medellín, Antioquia, and Colombia, as well as their major processes of transformation. He indicated it would be a show full of light, sound, and color in which great figures would be depicted. On the Colombian side, the company Culture Fit hired the company Live Events, which in turn designated its Production Manager, Jairo Soto Pardo, as Delegate Producer.

According to the Games' organization, the official cost of the opening event was COL$6,500,000,000, which is approximately US$3,423,630.

== Staging ==
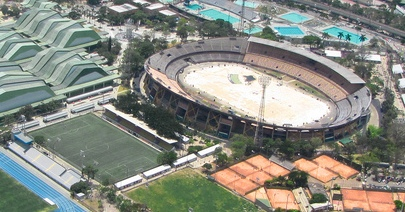
Atanasio Girardot Sports Unit – Four days before the opening of the Games. The stadium can be seen without turf due to the stage preparation for the ceremony's staging

To prepare the show, work was carried out on the stage for 18 days, and the event's details were kept in complete secrecy. To prepare the stage, the Bermuda grass turf was temporarily removed from the field, and while removed it was given a conservation and fertilization treatment. In total, 10,000 square metres were used for the opening staging.

Among other things, the following were required:

- A lighting system of 1 million watts
- 150,000 watts of sound
- 10,000 metres of cable distributed across the stage
- 150,000 kilograms of materials

The preparations for the opening act made it impossible to use Atanasio Girardot Stadium for any other activity during March. The organizing committee at the time informed the citizens of Medellín:

"[T]he football clubs of Medellín were officially notified as early as December 2008 that they would not be able to use the Atanasio Girardot Stadium during the month of March 2010... The opening of the Games requires a stage and physical setup of enormous proportions, and that is why the stadium must be available from 1 March. The Games, which are an unprecedented event for the city, must be kept free of political interests. The citizens understand and value the efforts of an administration that has put all its effort into organizing a competition that will leave the community a legacy of civility and inclusion. The aim is none other than to make Medellín a better city every day."

The football clubs of Medellín, Atlético Nacional, and Independiente Medellín had to find a new venue for their matches between 1 March and 15 April 2010. This was criticized by football fans.

Within a few hours of the ceremony, the dismantling of all the equipment began, along with the reinstallation of the 15,400 sections of turf that had been removed 20 days earlier. During this period, the soil was cleaned, leveled, and the ground was replaced with sand to improve water filtration. The Atanasio Girardot Stadium became the sports venue that hosted the final of Football at the South American Games. It was likewise planned to resume matches of the 2010 season of Colombian football at the venue on 1 April.

== Access and security ==
Although the show began at seven in the evening, entry to the stadium opened at four in the afternoon through 32 gates. There were no fixed seat assignments with the tickets.

Several nearby roads were closed, including Calle 48, Calle 50, and Carrera 74, so attendees were advised to use the city's metro service to reach the stadium. To manage traffic in the area during the opening event, the traffic police assigned 80 additional officers to the task, and the Metropolitan Police of Medellín assigned a special contingent of 1,200 officers with the primary aim of providing the security required for the event.

== Events during the ceremony ==
The National Anthem of the Republic of Colombia opened the 100-minute act, made up of eleven segments, which drew inspiration from the values of the South American Games: effort, self-improvement, friendship, and teamwork. Approximately 2,500 people, including actors, producers, set designers, and directors, worked on the opening ceremony, of whom 700 artists were on stage during the event.

=== Artistic show ===
The artistic show was called Echoes, a Fantastic Journey through Antioquia (Ecos, un Viaje Fantástico por Antioquia). The following words opened the ceremony:

South America has waited four years with hope, Colombia has given its all, Antioquia has given its best, and Medellín! Medellín has given all its affection so that everyone can enjoy the best Games. Everything is ready now, set for a magical night like few others. Welcome all to the opening ceremony of the ninth South American Games, Medellín 2010.

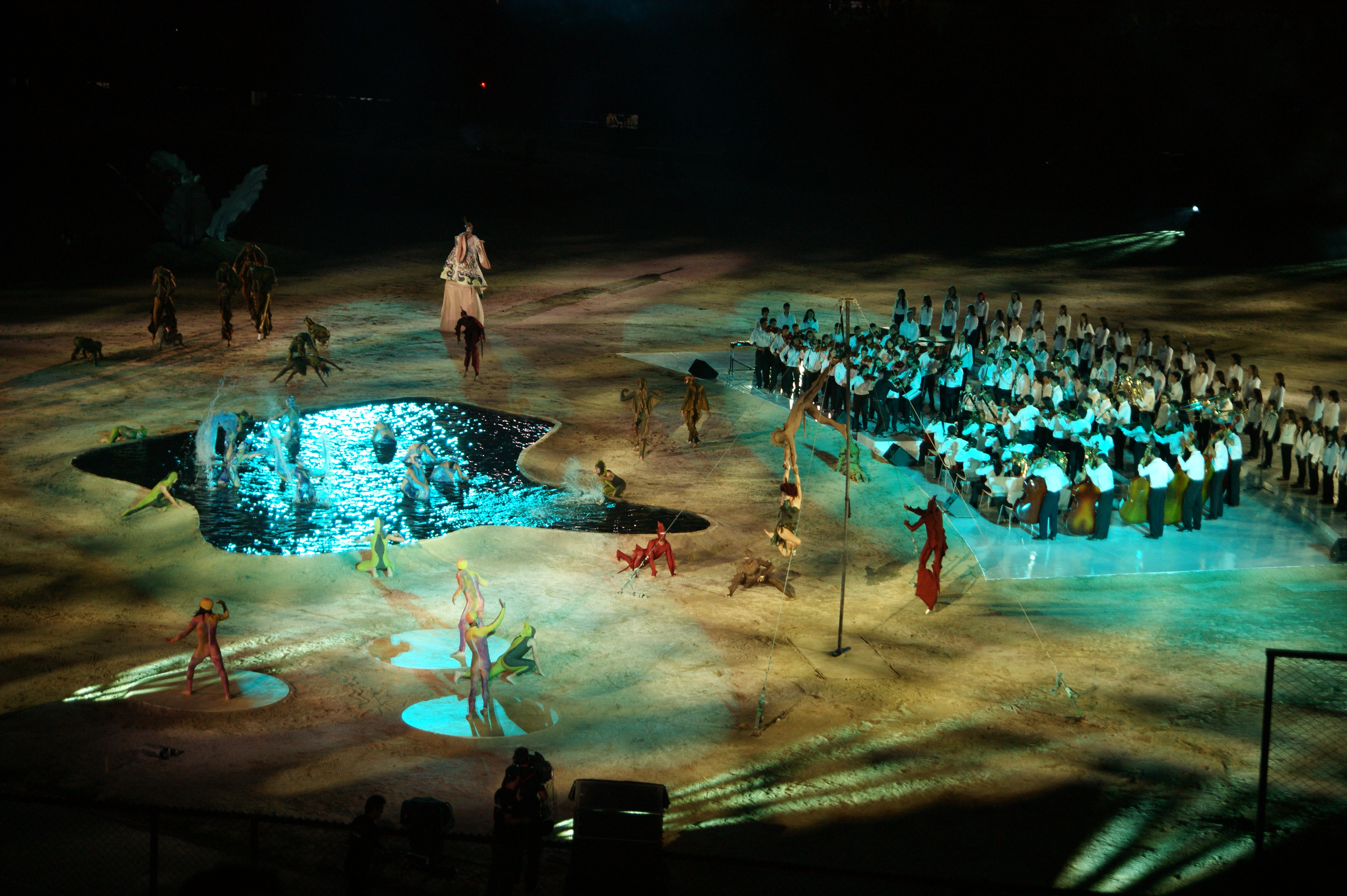
Biodiversity Act – Photograph by Telemedellín

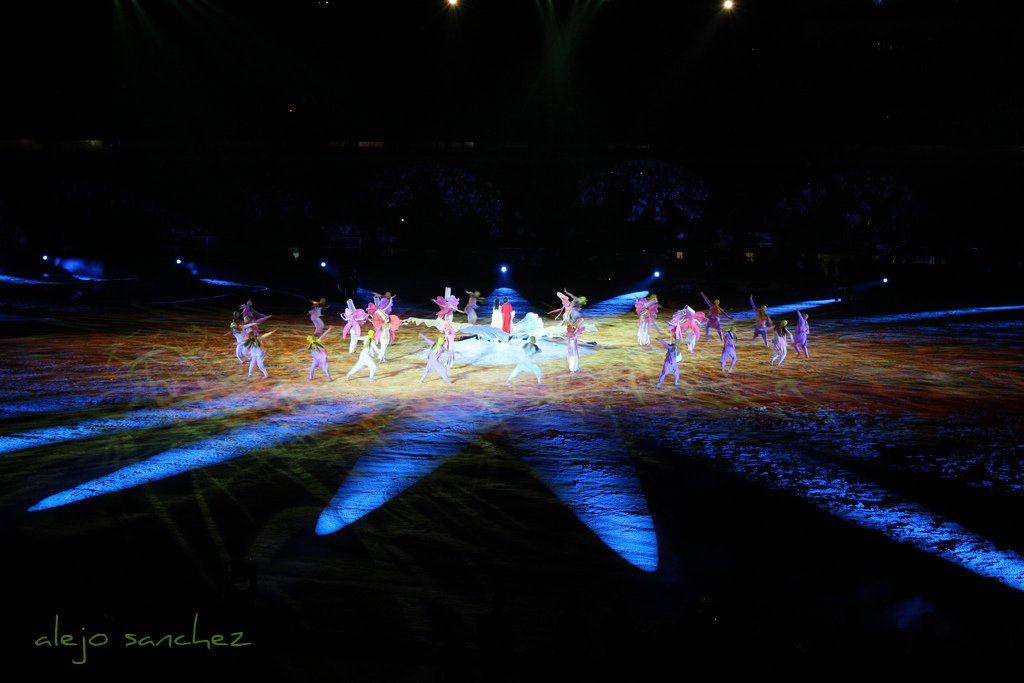
In the scene called Orchid, an allegorical dance to the flower's beauty was performed

1. Act of Innocence. The ceremony began with the appearance of a girl and a boy in the middle of the field, who walked to the centre of the stage where an orchid bloomed, in what was called the awakening of life. Then, in a slow walk, they reached the edge of the field, where they welcomed two giant sculptures by the Antioquian artist Fernando Botero representing the beauty of the male and female body, alongside the fusion of innocence and strength, sensuality and softness.

2. Act of Textiles. A group of artists performed a ceremony with ribbons and dance representing a journey through time in the development of textiles, an important part of Medellín's economic activity, the textile industry.

3. Act of Coffee and Fire. Dozens of artists holding torches performed acrobatic acts, lighting up the whole stage. To the sound of drums, the performers sowed the fire of the sporting spirit's flame.

4. Act of Fashion. Several Antioquian models put on a catwalk show, posing like mannequins to the rhythm of electronic music; the designs worn by the models were entirely Colombian creations made by seven designers. The act sought to highlight that Medellín is considered the fashion capital.

5. Act of the Horses. With galloping horses, an animal closely tied to Antioquian identity, riders performed a display of acrobatics, running across the field to simulate an endless struggle.

6. Act of Biodiversity. In a tribute to Mother Earth and nature, in a first scene called "awakening", men and women simulating wild animal species such as frogs and iguanas performed a dance around an artificial lake. The scene was accompanied by a live choir and depicted Mother Earth speaking to the planet and showing the evolution of species. It further illustrated how creatures, in the course of evolution, emerge from the aquatic ecosystem. The act also represented Colombian biodiversity and its perfect harmony between animal and plant life.

7. Act of the Condor. The condor, a bird and symbol of Colombia that can be seen on the country's coat of arms, was the inspiration for the acrobatic section. In a performance alluding to its freedom, a group of acrobats performed a dance and gymnastics act.

8. Act of Adam and Eve. A group of 20 artists inside plastic balls printed with images of Woman and Man surrounded the orchid in a solemn dance representative of the famous painting called Adam and Eve by Fernando Botero.

9. Act of the Orchid. In an allegorical dance, original seduction was evoked, the love between man and woman. In the scene, the children who opened the ceremony joined the act dedicated to the orchid, representative of Colombia and its natural beauty.

The ceremony's two final segments then followed: the Parade of Nations and the Opening and Lighting of the Cauldron.

=== Parade of nations ===
In the opening ceremony, before the parade of nations, the organizing committee took the opportunity to thank the Games' group of volunteers, who were positioned around the stage to later welcome the athletes, with the following words:

Being a volunteer is a passion, a feeling grounded in service. But beyond that, the sports volunteer puts a personal stamp on the task, giving it dedication and boundless joy. The volunteer at Medellín 2010 has the gift of being a magnificent host, an excellent guide, a great friend, and is committed to working so that athletes, delegates, judges, dignitaries, and journalists leave our city with the joy of wanting to return soon to their new home... Medellín.

Once the thanks had concluded, the following words opened the parade of nations:

Ladies and gentlemen, we greet the athletes, the special guests of the Medellín 2010 South American Games celebration. They are the ones who bring the emotion. All of them, men and women, have worked hard to come and seek their best marks. And as the host country of the first Games in 1978, leading the fifteen delegations... Bolivia.

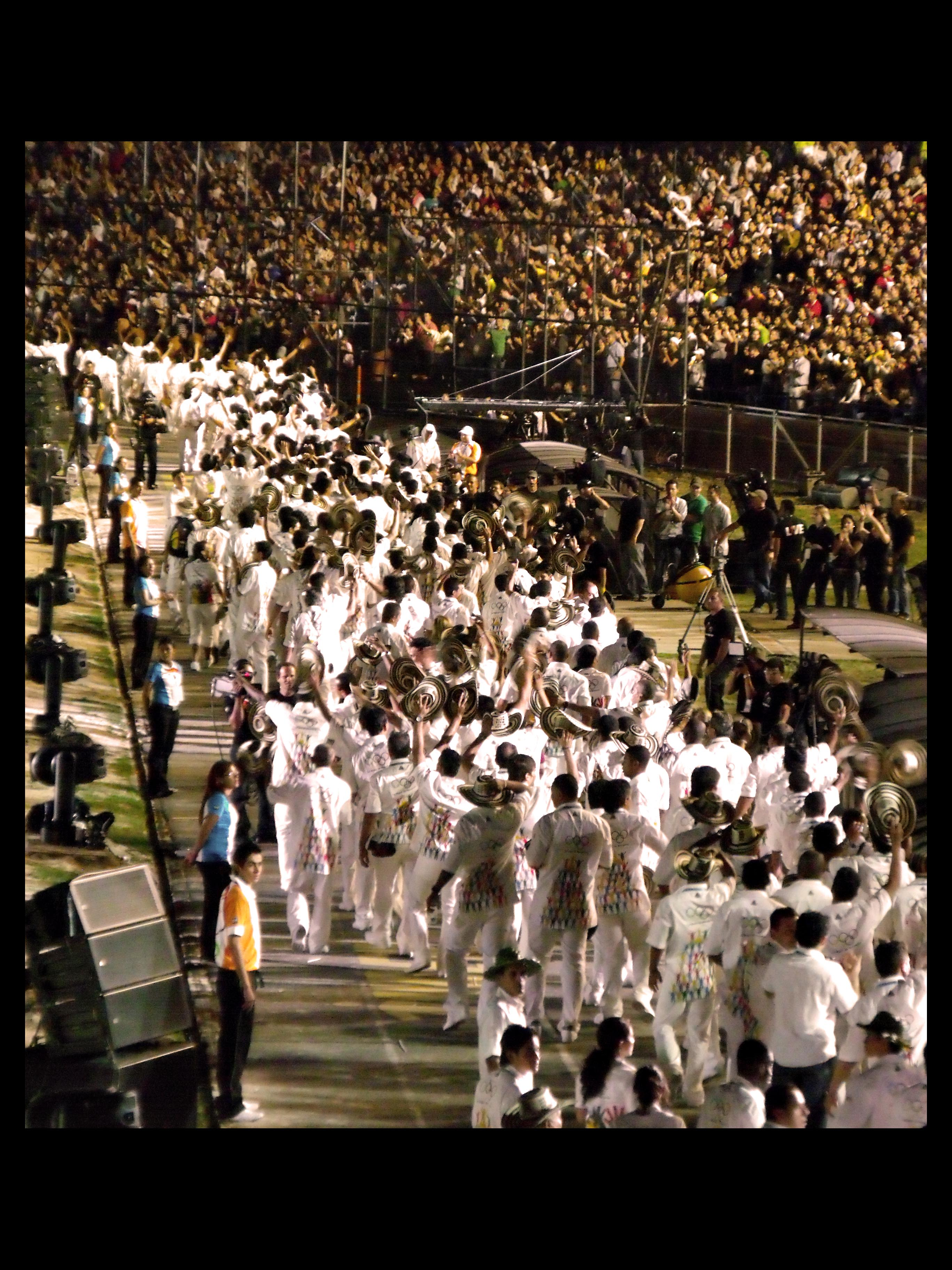
Colombian delegation at the IX 2010 South American Games

| Order of appearance | Country | Delegation size | Flag bearer | |
|---|---|---|---|---|
| 1 | Bolivia | 115 athletes | Oscar Soliz | Road Cycling |
| 2 | Netherlands Antilles | 59 athletes | Ingrid Gonesh | Shooting |
| 3 | Argentina | 563 athletes | Walter Pérez | Track Cycling |
| 4 | Aruba | 28 athletes | José Roberto Reyes | BMX |
| 5 | Brazil | 573 athletes | Ketleyn Quadros | Judo |
| 6 | Chile | 456 athletes | Paris Inostroza | Fencing |
| 7 | Ecuador | 280 athletes | Oliba Seledina Nieve Arroyo | Weightlifting |
| 8 | Guyana | 8 athletes | Dennis Horatio | Athletics |
| 9 | Panama | 27 athletes | Rene de Urriola | Judo |
| 10 | Paraguay | 124 athletes | Víctor Abel Fatecha | Athletics |
| 11 | Peru | 242 athletes | Claudia Rivero | Badminton |
| 12 | Suriname | 26 athletes | Jair Tjon En Fa | Cycling |
| 13 | Uruguay | 155 athletes | Deborah Rodríguez | Athletics |
| 14 | Venezuela | 451 athletes | Fabiola Ramos | Table Tennis |
| 15 | (Colombia) Colombia | 644 athletes | Jackeline Rentería | Wrestling |

- The Chilean delegation marched carrying a banner reading «Fuerza Chile!» ("Stay strong, Chile!"), in solidarity with the 2010 Chile earthquake recently suffered by that country, making it one of the most acclaimed delegations of the ceremony.
- The Colombian delegation marched in Colombia's official uniform, sponsored by the firm Totto. As the hosts of the event, they marched last and also received a great ovation from the crowd.

Finally, a group of boys and girls, representing future generations, carried the flag of the International Olympic Committee with its Olympic rings and the flag of the South American Sports Organization, which were raised accompanied by the Olympic Hymn. The organizing committee's words told the spectators:

In Medellín, girls and boys come first, because the future lies with them and because, moreover, with them things are simple and clear. That is why they are represented here today. The flags of ODESUR and of the International Olympic Committee in the hands of the girls and boys of our city are a mark that the ninth South American Games, Medellín 2010, are built on excellence and respect.

=== Speeches ===
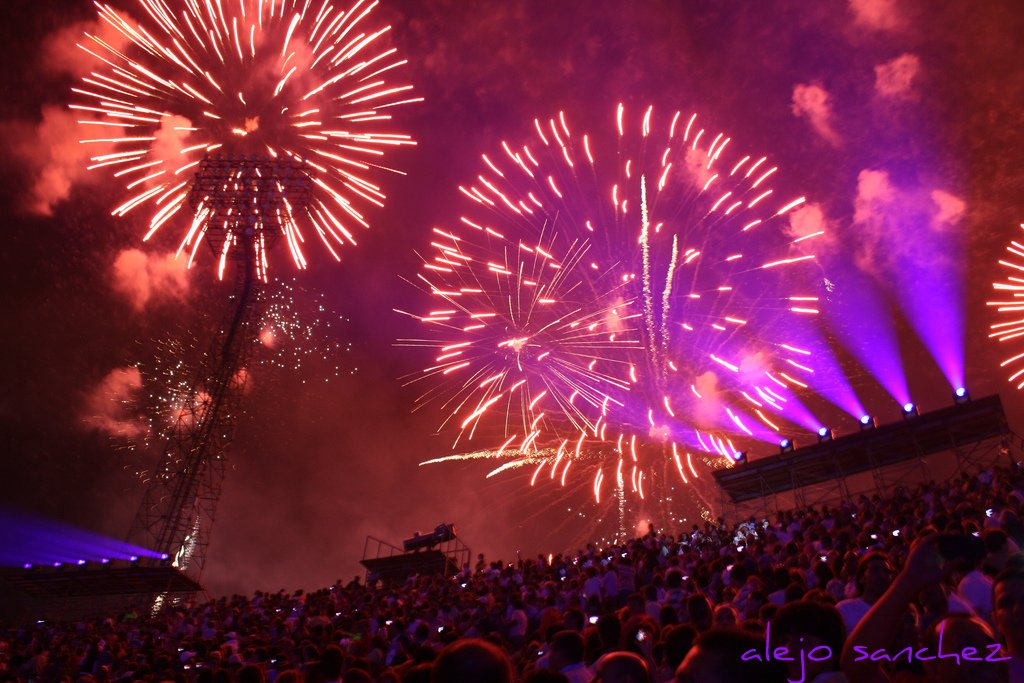
The ceremony ended with a fireworks display

- Alicia Eugenia Vargas Restrepo, director of the IX South American Games, welcomed each of the athletes to the city known as the Eternal Spring and the Mountain Capital, which had developed new sports complexes for the competitions. She also thanked Chile for attending the Games despite the circumstances (2010 Chile earthquake) and mentioned Medellín's interest in becoming the host city of the 2018 Summer Youth Olympics, an event that would ultimately be held in Buenos Aires, Argentina. In Alicia Vargas's own words:

South America is growing with dignity, vigor, and, often, in the midst of the harshest adversities of nature. Today Chile is with us, and for that we say thank you very much... To the Olympic leaders, we remind them that this country, Antioquia and Medellín, want to host the 2018 Youth Olympic Games — thank you.

— For the complete speech of Alicia Eugenia Vargas Restrepo, see
- this link

In her speech, Alicia Vargas explained that the city's climate, geography, and terrain had inspired the design of several of the city's sports facilities, and that this was likewise the reason Medellín is called the Mountain Capital and the city of eternal spring. She also noted that the host city is characterized by the hospitality, tenacity, and capability of its citizens, who, in recent years, have undergone transformations and evolutions driven by a commitment to future generations. Finally, Alicia Vargas highlighted the Olympic principles (behaving with truthfulness, fair play, and without cheating) that athletes must uphold and described them as the determination to achieve their goals and to accept defeat.

- Carlos Arthur Nuzman, a Brazilian and president of the South American Sports Organization (ODESUR), greeted the city of Medellín, the president of Colombia Álvaro Uribe Vélez, the governor of Antioquia Luis Alfredo Ramos, the mayor of Medellín Alonso Salazar, the visiting presidents of the International Olympic Committee Mario Vázquez Raña and Thomas Bach, the president of the Games' Organizing Committee, Alicia Eugenia Vargas Restrepo, and the athletes. He said that the current Games were a step in Medellín's process of transformation and an example for the whole of South America. He thanked the Organizing Committee and the Games' volunteers. He also called for a minute of silence for those who died in the 2010 Chile earthquake and offered support to the Chilean people. He likewise highlighted the opportunity for South America to host the Olympic Games on the continent for the first time in 2016. To conclude, he said that the coming days would be days of competition within the sporting venues and of brotherhood outside them. Finally, he asked the President of Colombia, Álvaro Uribe Vélez, to declare the 2010 South American Games open. This is how he put it:

Dear friends, let us make these Games a celebration of brotherhood, fellowship and integration for our South American Olympic movement. At this moment I have the honor of asking the President of the Republic of Colombia to declare the South American Games, Medellín 2010, open. Thank you all very much.

— For the complete speech of Carlos Arthur Nuzman, see
- this link

- Álvaro Uribe Vélez, President of Colombia, welcomed the athletes, technical staff, coaches, officials, and journalists. He likewise thanked Medellín, the co-host municipalities, the governor of Antioquia, the mayor of Medellín, and the ministers of Culture and Coldeportes. In his speech, he highlighted how Colombia aspires in the future to host the Pan American Games, the Youth Olympic Games, and the FIFA World Cup. The president then declared the South American Games of Medellín 2010 open and called on the athletes to gather for competition. In his own words,

...[T]his nation, this department, this city, with all the effort put into these South American Games, with all the commitment for the Under-20 event of 2011, aspire to host in the future the Pan American Games, the host of the youth Olympics, the host of the football World Cup...

...I declare the ninth South American Games, Medellín 2010, open, and, following tradition, I call on the young people of South America belonging to the South American Organization ODESUR to gather for two weeks of competition across the eight co-host cities in the department of Antioquia — thank you very much.

— For the complete speech of Álvaro Uribe Vélez, see
- this link

The gymnast Jorge Hugo Giraldo, on behalf of the athletes, took the athletes' oath, while María Cristina Ríos took the corresponding oath for the judges.

Good evening. On behalf of all the competitors, I promise that we will take part in these South American Games respecting and abiding by their rules, committed to sport free of doping and drugs, with an authentic Olympic spirit, for the greater glory of sport and the honour of our teams. Thank you very much.

— Jorge Hugo Giraldo

Good evening. On behalf of all the judges and officials, I promise that we will carry out our duties during the South American Games with the strictest impartiality, respecting and abiding by their rules with an authentic Olympic spirit. Thank you very much.

— María Cristina Ríos

=== Lighting of the cauldron ===
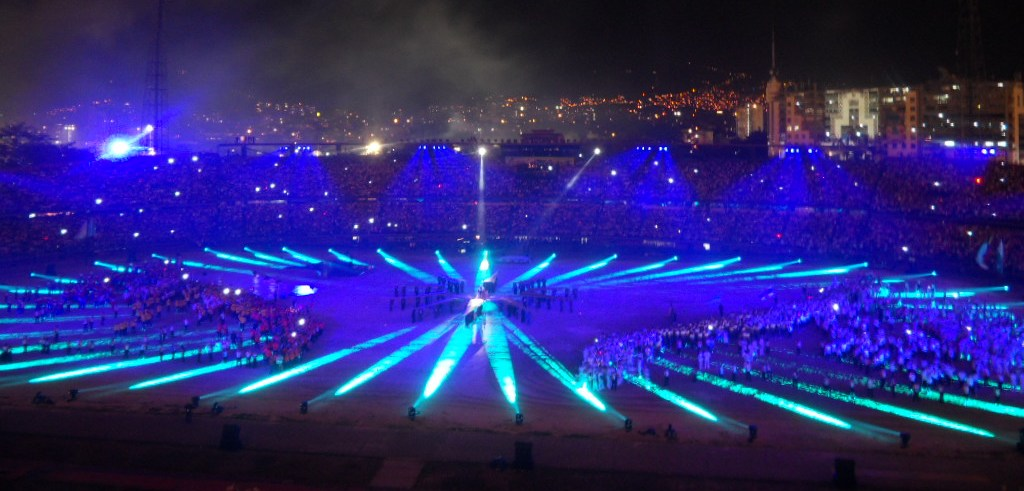
Final leg of the South American Flame relay

After two weeks of the South American Flame relay from Bolivia, passing through the co-host cities and neighbourhoods of Medellín, the flame began its final leg at six in the evening on 19 March from the La Alpujarra Administrative Centre and was carried along Avenida San Juan to Carrera 73. There, Lucy López, national table tennis champion, received it to carry it to the north Olympic gate of the Atanasio Girardot Stadium. The South American Flame was welcomed with the following words:

Fire symbolizes purity and carries a magical, bewitching meaning; the South American flame is union and passion. In sport, fire is brotherhood, human warmth and dedication — a force that arises and becomes victory. Fire is also what rescues friendship and defeat. With fire, sport lights its Olympic spirit, and today Medellín 2010 does just that.

The flame was brought in by Jesús Augusto Romero Montoya, a Colombian Olympic gymnast who was left disabled following an injury at the Pan American Games. The athlete passed the torch to Olympic medalist María Isabel Urrutia, who had won a gold medal at the 2000 Summer Olympics.

The final leg of the South American Flame relay was carried out by Colombian athlete and Olympic medalist Ximena Restrepo, accompanied by two of her own children, who had also opened the opening ceremony. They carried the flame to the centre of the stage, where, accompanied by a dazzling fire act and lights, a fireworks display began that was said to be of a scale Medellín had never before witnessed.

In a display lasting five minutes, the entire area of the Atanasio Girardot Sports Unit, both inside and outside the stadium, was filled with fire and lights, celebrating the start of the days of competition.

== Broadcast ==
The Opening Ceremony was broadcast by National Television Commission of Colombia (CNTV), whose signal could be retransmitted free of charge by any interested television channels.

== See also ==
- 2010 South American Games
- South American Games
