= Tennis at the 2010 South American Games =

Champions

Men's singles
- Facundo Arguello (ARG)

Women's singles
- Cecilia Costa Melgar (CHI)

Men's doubles
- Diego Hidalgo; Roberto Quiroz (ECU)

Women's doubles
- Fernanda Brito; Cecilia Costa Melgar (CHI)
| ← 2006 · | South American Games | · 2014 → |

There were four tennis events at the 2010 South American Games. The events were held over March 19–24.

== Medal table ==
| Rank | Nation | Gold | Silver | Bronze | Total |
|---|---|---|---|---|---|
| 1 | Chile (CHI) | 2 | 0 | 1 | 3 |
| 2 | Argentina (ARG) | 1 | 2 | 1 | 4 |
| 3 | Ecuador (ECU) | 1 | 0 | 0 | 1 |
| 4 | Paraguay (PAR) | 0 | 1 | 0 | 1 |
| 4 | Venezuela (VEN) | 0 | 1 | 0 | 1 |
| 6 | Bolivia (BOL) | 0 | 0 | 1 | 1 |
| 6 | Brazil (BRA) | 0 | 0 | 1 | 1 |
| Totals (7 entries) | | 4 | 4 | 4 | 12 |

== Medalists ==
| Event | Gold | Silver | Bronze |
|---|---|---|---|
Men's events
| Men's singles | Facundo Argüello; Argentina | Agustín Velotti; Argentina | Guilherme Clézar; Brazil |
| Men's doubles | Diego Hidalgo; Roberto Quiroz; Ecuador | Facundo Argüello; Agustín Velotti; Argentina | Alejandro Arias Justiniano; Bruno del Granado Barrancos; Bolivia |
Women's events
| Women's singles | Cecilia Costa Melgar; Chile | Verónica Cepede Royg; Paraguay | Fernanda Brito; Chile |
| Women's doubles | Fernanda Brito; Cecilia Costa Melgar; Chile | Andrea Gámiz; Adriana Pérez; Venezuela | Agustina Eskenazi; Catalina Pella; Argentina |
