= Tennis at the 2010 South American Games – Men's singles =

Men's singles
- Tennis at the 2010 South American Games

Events
Singles	men	women
Doubles	men	women
- South American Games

The men's singles event at the 2010 South American Games was held over March 22–28.

Argentine Facundo Arguello won the gold medal.

== Medalists ==
Gold	Silver	Bronze
Facundo Arguello; Argentina	Agustín Velotti; Argentina	Guilherme Clézar; Brazil

== Draw ==
Key

- Q = Qualifier
- WC = Wild card
- LL = Lucky loser
- Alt = Alternate
- ITF = ITF entry
- PR = Protected ranking
- SR = Special ranking
- SE = Special exempt
- JE = Junior exempt
- JR = Junior Accelerator Programme entrant
- CO = College Accelerator Programme entrant
- NG = Next Gen Accelerator Program entrant
- w/o = Walkover
- r = Retired
- d = Defaulted

=== Final four ===
Semifinals
1	Agustín Velotti (ARG)	7^{7}	7^{7}
4	Duilio Beretta (PER)	6^{3}	6^{4}
3	Guilherme Clézar (BRA)	6	3
5	Facundo Arguello (ARG)	7	6

Final
1	Agustín Velotti (ARG)	7	2	4
5	Facundo Arguello (ARG)	6	6	6
Bronze medal match
4	Duilio Beretta (PER)	4	3
3	Guilherme Clézar (BRA)	6	6

=== Top half ===
First round
Juan Antonio Martinez (PAR)	2	1
Sebastian Lopez (COL)	6	6
Bruno del Granado Barrancos (BOL)	4	6	3
Sergio Galdós (PER)	6	4	6
Felipe Ríos (CHI)	2	1
7	Ricardo Rodríguez (VEN)	6	6
4	Duilio Beretta (PER)	6	6
Cristian Chavez (COL)	1	3
Sarvano Mangalie (SUR)	0	0
Thiago Pinheiro (BRA)	6	6
Martín Cuevas (URU)	6	6
Luis Vivas (VEN)	3	1
6	Roberto Quiroz (ECU)	6	7^{7}
Alejandro Justiniano (BOL)	4	6^{5}

Second round
1	Agustín Velotti (ARG)	6	6
S Lopez (COL)	4	1
S Galdós (PER)	3	5
7	R Rodríguez (VEN)	6	6
4	D Beretta (PER)	6	6
T Pinheiro (BRA)	2	2
M Cuevas (URU)	6	5	3
6	R Quiroz (ECU)	3	7	6

Quarterfinals
1	A Vellotti (ARG)	7^{7}	6
7	R Rodríguez (VEN)	6^{5}	3
4	D Beretta (PER)	6	6
6	R Quiroz (ECU)	4	2

Semifinals
1	A Vellotti (ARG)	7^{7}	7^{7}
4	D Beretta (PER)	6^{3}	6^{4}

=== Bottom half ===
First round
8	Diego Galeano (PAR)	7	6
Rafael Junek (PER)	6	2
Benjamin Gallegos (CHI)	7	6
Tomas Bulles (COL)	6	4
Diego Hidalgo (ECU)	4	5
Diego Schwartzman (ARG)	6	7
Rodrigo Senattore (URU)	3	2
3	Guilherme Clézar (BRA)	6	6
5	Facundo Arguello (ARG)	6	6
Roberto Elio (BOL)	2	1
Thiago Monteiro (BRA)	6	3	6
Francisco Kim (PAR)	1	6	3
Alvaro Aguad (CHI)	1	3
Juan Ceballos (VEN)	6	6

Second round
8	D Galeano (PAR)	6	7
B Gallegos (CHI)	4	6
D Schwartzman (ARG)	3	6
3	G Clézar (BRA)	6	7
5	F Arguello (ARG)	7	6
T Monteiro (BRA)	6	3
J Ceballos (VEN)	5	2
2	Juan Sebastián Gómez (COL)	7	6

Quarterfinals
8	D Galeano (PAR)	7	2	5
3	G Clézar (BRA)	6	6	7
5	F Arguello (ARG)	6	3	6
2	J S Gómez (COL)	3	6	2

Semifinals
3	G Clézar (BRA)	6	3
5	F Arguello (ARG)	7	6
