= Tennis at the South American Games =

Tennis has been an event at the South American Games since the first edition in 1978. Until 1986 it was known as the Southern Cross Games.

== Medalists ==
=== Men's singles ===
Event	Gold	Silver	Bronze
1978	Andrés Gómez; Ecuador	Diego Pérez; Uruguay	Raúl Viver; Ecuador
1982	Christian Miniussi; Argentina	Roberto Azar; Argentina	Claudio Santibáñez; Chile
1986	Juan Pablo Queirolo; Chile	Sergio Cortés; Chile	Marcelo Filippini; Uruguay
1990	Américo Venero; Peru	Gonzalo Fernández; Chile	Gastón Etlis; Argentina
1994	Jimy Szymanski; Venezuela	Pablo Campana; Ecuador	Gustavo Kuerten; Brazil; Márcio Carlsson; Brazil
1998	Sebastián Decoud; Argentina	Claudio Alvarado; Chile	Rodolfo Darvich; Argentina; Américo Venero; Peru
2002	Martín Vilarrubí; Uruguay	Alexandre Bonatto; Brazil	Franco Ferreiro; Brazil
2006	Nicolas Santos; Brazil	Mauricio Doria; Bolivia	Rasid Winklaar; Netherlands Antilles
2010	Facundo Argüello; Argentina	Agustín Velotti; Argentina	Guilherme Clézar; Brazil
2014	Facundo Bagnis; Argentina	Guido Andreozzi; Argentina	Paul Capdeville; Chile
2018	Tomás Barrios; Chile	Francisco Cerúndolo; Argentina	Juan Pablo Varillas; Peru
2022	Facundo Díaz Acosta; Argentina	Gustavo Heide; Brazil	Alejandro Tabilo; Chile

=== Men's doubles ===
Event	Gold	Silver	Bronze
1978	Andrés Gómez; Raúl Viver; Ecuador	Diego Pérez; Pablo Graf; Uruguay	Juan Carlos Yunis; Ricardo Rivera; Argentina
1982	Christian Miniussi; Roberto Azar; Argentina	Claudio Santibáñez; Ricardo Hormann; Chile	Alan Chacon; Ricardo Segovia; Venezuela
1986	Marcelo Filippini; Nicolas Zurmendi; Uruguay	Sergio Cortés; Rubén Gajardo; Chile	Martin Stringari; Gustavo Carbonari; Argentina
1990	Marcos Colignon; Gonzalo Fernández; Chile	Gastón Etlis; Carlos Tarantino; Argentina	Alejandro Aramburu; Américo Venero; Peru
1994	Jimy Szymanski; Juan Bianchi; Venezuela	Luis Morejón; Pablo Campana; Ecuador	Gustavo Kuerten; Márcio Carlsson; Brazil; Antonio Eterovic; Pablo Ugarte; Bolivia
1998	Giovanni Lapentti; Pablo Campana; Ecuador	Rodolfo Darvich; Juan Ferrer; Argentina	Carlos González; Luis Hormazábal; Chile; Américo Venero; Iván Miranda; Peru
2002	Marcel Felder; Martín Vilarrubí; Uruguay	Jorge Aguilar; Nicolas Riquelme; Chile	Horacio Zeballos; Martín Alund; Argentina
2006	Facundo Bagnis; Guido Pella; Argentina	Ricardo Urzúa; Hans Podlipnik; Chile	Sergio Galdós; Juan Pedro Torres; Peru
2010	Diego Hidalgo; Roberto Quiroz; Ecuador	Facundo Argüello; Agustín Velotti; Argentina	Alejandro Arias Justiniano; Bruno del Granado Barrancos; Bolivia
2014	Guido Andreozzi and Facundo Bagnis; Argentina	Nicolás Barrientos and Carlos Salamanca; Colombia	Jorge Aguilar and Paul Capdeville; Chile
2018	Diego Hidalgo; Emilio Gómez; Ecuador	Jorge Panta; Juan Pablo Varillas; Peru	Cristian Rodríguez; Eduardo Struvay; Colombia
2022	Gustavo Heide; Orlando Luz; Brazil	Boris Arias; Federico Zeballos; Bolivia	Facundo Díaz Acosta; Tomás Farjat; Argentina

=== Men's team ===
Event	Gold	Silver	Bronze
1978	Ecuador	Argentina	Uruguay
1990	Peru	Argentina	Chile
1994	Venezuela	Ecuador	Brazil; Bolivia
1998	Ecuador	Chile	Peru; Argentina

=== Women's singles ===
Event	Gold	Silver	Bronze
1978	Adriana Alvarez; Argentina	Norah Moreno; Argentina	Carlota Velazco; Bolivia
1982	Mariana Pérez Roldán; Argentina	Mercedes Paz; Argentina	Manola Murillo; Chile
1986	Patricia Miller; Uruguay	Paulina Sepúlveda; Chile	Macarena Miranda; Chile
1990	Paula Cabezas; Chile	Debora Garat; Argentina	Karim Strohmeier; Peru
1994	Paula Cabezas; Chile	Claudia Brause; Uruguay	María-Alejandra Quezada; Chile; Déborah Gaviria; Peru
1998	Clarisa Fernández; Argentina	Eugenia Chialvo; Argentina	Paula Cabezas; Chile; Bárbara Castro; Chile
2002	Larissa Carvalho; Brazil	Marina Tavares; Brazil	Soledad Esperón; Argentina
2006	Teliana Pereira; Brazil	Mariana Duque; Colombia	Malena Gordo; Argentina
2010	Cecilia Costa Melgar; Chile	Verónica Cepede Royg; Paraguay	Fernanda Brito; Chile
2014	Paula Cristina Gonçalves; Brazil	Verónica Cepede Royg; Paraguay	Bianca Botto; Peru
2018	Montserrat González; Paraguay	Daniela Seguel; Chile	Fernanda Brito; Chile
2022	María Herazo González; Colombia	Verónica Cepede; Paraguay	Yuliana Lizarazo; Colombia

=== Women's doubles ===
Event	Gold	Silver	Bronze
1978	Mariana Mettola; Adriana Alvarez; Argentina	Patricia Hermeda; Shirley Echaiz; Chile	Carlota Velasco; Cinthya Teran; Bolivia
1982	Mariana Pérez Roldán; Mercedes Paz; Argentina	Manola Murillo; Paulina Sepúlveda; Chile	Fiorita Gomesz; Nives Missana; Venezuela
1990	Paula Cabezas; Melisa Castro; Chile	Debora Garat; María Luz Rodriguez; Argentina	Carla Rodriguez; Paola Monteferri; Peru
1994	Maria Fernanda Quezada; Bárbara Castro; Chile	María Francesa; Maria Marra; Venezuela	Alexandra Guzman; Nuria Niemes; Ecuador; Fernanda Tsucamoto; Marcia Komlos; Brazil
1998	Paula Cabezas; Bárbara Castro; Chile	Maria Cristina Campana; Paola Guerrero; Ecuador	Jorgelina Cravero; Clarisa Fernández; Argentina; Cecilia Guillenea; Daniela Peyrot; Uruguay
2002	Larissa Carvalho; Marina Tavares; Brazil	Patricia Coimbra; Jenifer Widjaja; Brazil	Soledad Esperón; Micaela Moran; Argentina
2006	Teliana Pereira; Roxane Vaisemberg; Brazil	Mariana Muci; Marina Giral; Venezuela	Tatiana Búa; Malena Gordo; Argentina
2010	Fernanda Brito; Cecilia Costa Melgar; Chile	Andrea Gámiz; Adriana Pérez; Venezuela	Agustina Eskenazi; Catalina Pella; Argentina
2014	Andrea Gámiz and Adriana Pérez; Venezuela	Verónica Cepede Royg and Montserrat González; Paraguay	Paula Cristina Gonçalves and Laura Pigossi; Brazil
2018	Alexa Guarachi; Daniela Seguel; Chile	Camila Giangreco; Montserrat González; Paraguay	Camila Romero; Charlotte Römer; Ecuador
2022	María Herazo González; Yuliana Lizarazo; Colombia	Ingrid Martins; Rebeca Pereira; Brazil	Daniela Seguel; Fernanda Labraña; Chile

=== Women's team ===
Event	Gold	Silver	Bronze
1978	Argentina	Chile	Bolivia
1990	Chile	Argentina	Peru
1994	Chile	Venezuela	Ecuador; Brazil
1998	Argentina	Chile	Ecuador; Uruguay

=== Mixed doubles ===
Event	Gold	Silver	Bronze
1978	Adriana Alvarez; Juan Carlos Yunis; Argentina	Mariana Mattola; Ricardo Rivera; Argentina	Carlota Velasco; Marcelo Valenzuela; Bolivia
1982	Verónica Platz; Alejandro Rudi; Argentina	Manola Murillo; Claudio Santibáñez; Chile	Nives Missana; Alan Chacon; Venezuela
1990	Paula Cabezas; Marcos Colignion; Chile	Karim Strohmeier; Américo Venero; Peru	Melisa Castro; Gonzalo Fernández; Chile
1994	María Francesa; Jimy Szymanski; Venezuela	Nuria Niemes; Pablo Campana; Ecuador	Marcia Komlos; Gustavo Kuerten; Brazil; Carla Jimenez; Pablo Ugarte; Bolivia
2010	Adriana Pérez; Ricardo Rodríguez; Venezuela	Verónica Cepede; Diego Galeano; Paraguay	Paula Ormaechea; Diego Schwartzman; Argentina
2014	David Souto and Adriana Pérez; Venezuela	Nicolás Jarry and Camila Silva; Chile	Jorge Aguilar and Andrea Koch Benvenuto; Chile
2018	Roberto Maytín; Aymet Uzcátegui; Venezuela	Tomás Farjat; Melany Krywoj; Argentina	Gonzalo Lama; Alexa Guarachi; Chile
2022	Verónica Cepede; Daniel Vallejo; Paraguay	Noelia Zeballos; Federico Zeballos; Bolivia	Ingrid Martins; Orlando Luz; Brazil
