= Misleydis Díaz González =

Cuban tennis player

- Country (sports): Cuba
- Born: 23 August 1988 (age 37)
- Turned pro: 2005
- Retired: 2012
- Plays: Right (two-handed backhand)
- Prize money: $5,174

Singles
- Career record: 13–12
- Career titles: 0
- Highest ranking: No. 861 (14 November 2011)

Doubles
- Career record: 18–10
- Career titles: 4 ITF
- Highest ranking: No. 649 (10 October 2011)

Team competitions
- Fed Cup: 5–4

Misleydis Díaz González (born 23 August 1988) is a Cuban retired female tennis player.

In her career, Díaz González won four doubles titles on the ITF Women's Circuit. On 14 November 2011, she reached her best singles ranking of world No. 861. On 10 October 2011, she peaked at No. 649 in the doubles rankings.

Playing for Cuba Fed Cup team, Díaz González accumulated a win–loss record of 5–4 in Fed Cup competitions.

== ITF finals ==
=== Singles (0–2) ===
Legend $25,000 tournaments $10,000 tournaments	Finals by surface Hard (0–2) Clay (0–0)

Result	Date	Tournament	Surface	Opponent	Score
Loss	6 December 2010	Havana, Cuba	Hard	(Russia) Nadejda Guskova	1–6, 2–6
Loss	4 July 2011	Havana, Cuba	Hard	(Japan) Makiho Kozawa	1–6, 1–6

=== Doubles (4–0) ===
Legend $25,000 tournaments $10,000 tournaments	Finals by surface Hard (4–0) Clay (0–0)

Result	Date	Tier	Tournament	Surface	Partner	Opponents	Score
Win	6 December 2010	10,000	Havana, Cuba	Hard	(Cuba) Yamile Fors Guerra	(United Kingdom) Jennifer Allan (Russia) Nadejda Guskova	6–1, 6–2
Win	18 April 2001	10,000	Caracas, Venezuela	Hard	(Cuba) Yamile Fors Guerra	(Ukraine) Anastasia Kharchenko (Belarus) Viktoryia Kisialeva	3–6, 6–3, 6–4
Win	27 June 2001	10,000	Havana, Cuba	Hard	(Cuba) Yamile Fors Guerra	(Argentina) Andrea Benítez (United States) Margaret Lumia	6–2, 6–2
Win	4 July 2001	10,000	Havana, Cuba	Hard	(Cuba) Yamile Fors Guerra	(United Kingdom) Nicola George (Austria) Jeannine Prentner	6–4, 6–1

== Fed Cup participation ==
=== Singles (4–4) ===
Edition	Date	Location	Against	Surface	Opponent	W/L	Score
2009 Fed Cup; Americas Zone Group II	21 April 2009	Santo Domingo, Dominican Republic	(Trinidad and Tobago) Trinidad and Tobago	Hard	(Trinidad and Tobago) Carlista Mohammed	W	6–0, 6–1
2009 Fed Cup; Americas Zone Group II	22 April 2009	Santo Domingo, Dominican Republic	Dominican Republic	Hard	(Dominican Republic) Francesca Segarelli	W	5–7, 6–1, 6–4
2009 Fed Cup; Americas Zone Group II	23 April 2009	Santo Domingo, Dominican Republic	Bolivia	Hard	(Bolivia) Daniela Trigo	W	6–1, 6–2
2009 Fed Cup; Americas Zone Group II	24 April 2009	Santo Domingo, Dominican Republic	Guatemala	Hard	(Guatemala) Kirsten Andrea Weedon	W	6–4, 6–2
2010 Fed Cup; Americas Zone Group I	3 February 2010	Lambaré, Paraguay	(Canada) Canada	Clay	(Canada) Sharon Fichman	L	2–6, 1–6
2010 Fed Cup; Americas Zone Group I	4 February 2010	Lambaré, Paraguay	Brazil	Clay	(Brazil) Maria Fernanda Alves	L	1–6, 3–6
2010 Fed Cup; Americas Zone Group I	5 February 2010	Lambaré, Paraguay	Puerto Rico	Clay	(Puerto Rico) Monica Puig	L	1–6, 0–6
2010 Fed Cup; Americas Zone Group I	6 February 2010	Lambaré, Paraguay	Chile	Clay	(Chile) Cecilia Costa Melgar	L	3–6, 1–6

=== Doubles (1–0) ===
Edition	Date	Location	Against	Surface	Partner	Opponents	W/L	Score
2009 Fed Cup; Americas Zone Group II	25 April 2009	Santo Domingo, Dominican Republic	(Guatemala) Guatemala	Hard	(Cuba) Lumay Díaz Hernández	(Guatemala) Isabella Escobar (Guatemala) Paulina Schippers	W	6–0, 6–1
