= Nadejda Guskova =

Russian singer, philanthropist, journalist, and former tennis player (born 1992)

Nadejda Guskova (Note: Also spelled Nadezda or Nadezhda Guskova.) Надежда Гуськова (Russian)
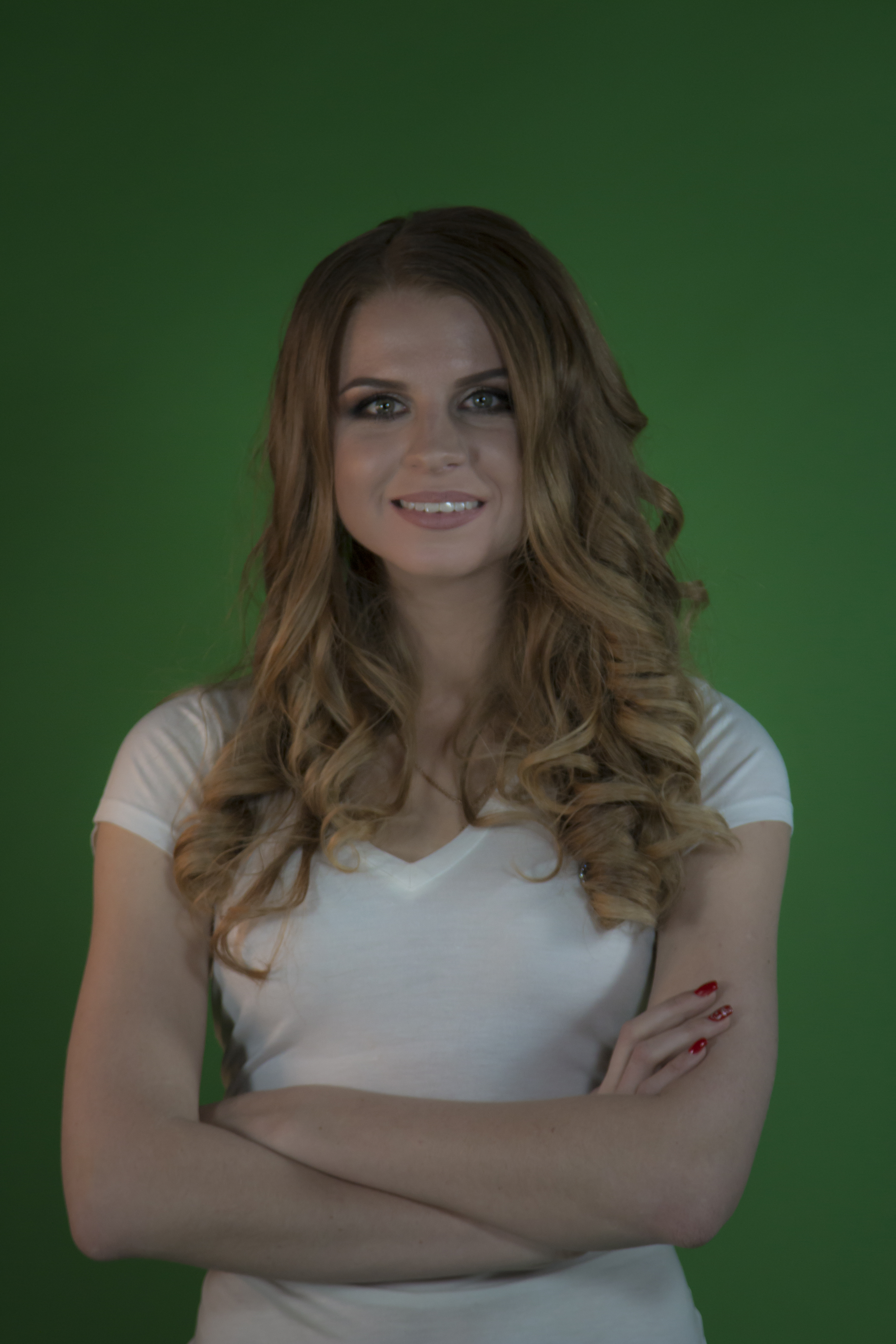
- Country (sports): Russia
- Born: 10 January 1992 (age 34) Russia
- Height: 1.79 m (5 ft 10 1/2 in)
- Turned pro: 2006
- Retired: 2012
- Plays: Right-handed (two-handed backhand)
- Prize money: $34,800

Singles
- Career record: 75–54
- Career titles: 2 ITF
- Highest ranking: No. 301 (28 February 2011)

Doubles
- Career record: 41–34
- Career titles: 4 ITF
- Highest ranking: No. 249 (6 June 2011)

Nadejda Guskova (/nəˈdɛʒdə ˈɡʌskoʊvə/; Russian: Надежда Гуськова; born 10 January 1992) is a Russian former tennis player, singer, philanthropist and journalist.

At the age of 16, she graduated from High School No. 2 (Ramensky, Russia) and was accepted at the MGAFK (Moscow State Academy of Physical Education), where she studied through distance learning program.

== Tennis career ==
Nadejda started playing tennis at the age of five. Her first coach was Sergei Koschienko. During summer months, she trained at the "Meteor" stadium in Zhukovsky, and in the hall of the Sports School during winter months.

Guskova won two singles and four doubles titles on the ITF Women's Circuit in her career. On 28 February 2011, she reached her best singles ranking of world No. 301. On 6 June 2011, she peaked at No. 249 in the WTA doubles rankings.

In 2008, she won an ITF singles title and reached the final in doubles at the Prince Cup, among juniors in Miami, Florida.

In September 2009, she sustained a serious injury and was unable, temporarily, to play tournaments.

In August 2010, Guskova for the first time became the winner of an ITF tournament in singles, at St. Petersburg, and in December, she won another ITF title in Havana, Cuba. From 2010 to 2012, she was coached by Lina Krasnoroutskaya.

Guskova made her WTA Tour debut at the 2010 Tashkent Open, defeating Ekaterina Dzehalevich, Maria Kondratieva and Tatiana Poutchek in the qualifying tournament. In the main draw, she defeated Olga Savchuk in straight sets.

In 2010, at the Russian Tennis Championship in Khanty-Mansiysk, she became double champion: in singles, beating second-seeded Ekaterina Ivanova in the final with a score of 6–4, 6–2, and in doubles with Maria Zharkova. In mixed-doubles competition (paired with Andrey Levin), she reached the final, but after sustaining a serious injury, was forced to retire.

Guskova retired from professional tennis 2012.

=== ITF Circuit finals ===
==== Singles: 2 (2 titles) ====
Legend $25,000 tournaments $10,000 tournaments	Finals by surface Hard (1–0) Clay (1–0)

Result	No.	Date	Tournament	Surface	Opponent	Score
Win	1.	22 August 2010	ITF St. Petersburg, Russia	Clay	(Russia) Anna Arina Marenko	6–2, 7–6^{(5)}
Win	2.	6 December 2010	ITF Havana, Cuba	Hard	(Cuba) Misleydis Díaz González	6–1, 6–2

==== Doubles: 7 (4 titles, 3 runner-ups) ====
Legend $25,000 tournaments $10,000 tournaments	Finals by surface Hard (0–2) Clay (4–1)

Result	No.	Date	Tournament	Surface	Partner	Opponents	Score
Win	1.	30 June 2008	ITF Cremona, Italy	Clay	(Russia) Elena Kulikova	(Italy) Benedetta Davato (Switzerland) Lisa Sabino	6–4, 6–1
Win	2.	2 August 2010	ITF Moscow, Russia	Clay	(Russia) Valeria Solovyeva	(Serbia) Teodora Mirčić (Australia) Marija Mirkovic	7–6^{(5)}, 6–3
Win	3.	6 September 2010	ITF Denain, France	Clay	(Ukraine) Maryna Zanevska	(Italy) Evelyn Mayr (Italy) Julia Mayr	6–2, 6–0
Loss	1.	6 December 2010	ITF Havana, Cuba	Hard	(United Kingdom) Jennifer Allan	(Cuba) Misleydis Díaz González (Cuba) Yamile Fors Guerra	1–6, 2–6
Loss	2.	13 February 2011	ITF Rancho Mirage, United States	Hard	(Poland) Sandra Zaniewska	(Czech Republic) Karolína Plíšková (Czech Republic) Kristýna Plíšková	7–6^{(6)}, 1–6, [5–10]
Win	4.	16 May 2011	ITF Moscow, Russia	Clay	(Russia) Valeria Solovyeva	(Poland) Justyna Jegiołka (Ukraine) Veronika Kapshay	6–3, 7–6^{(2)}
Loss	3.	15 January 2012	ITF Innisbrook, United States	Clay	(Italy) Gioia Barbieri	(Belarus) Darya Kustova (Romania) Raluca Olaru	3–6, 1–6

== Music career ==
After being forced to leave the Tennis Pro league due to her shoulder injury, Guskova devoted herself to her musical career.

In June 2014, a video clip for the song "Make Me Feel" was filmed by the clip maker Aslan Ahmadov. On 28 April 2016, the debut album Time was released, which includes 12 songs.

On 1 September 2017, Guskova performed the song "Time" («Время») at the Kremlin. Other songs of hers – "Fly Away" («Улетай»), "Angel", "In the Clouds" («В облаках»), "Macho", and "Do Not Rush" («Не спеши») – were included in a soundtrack for the TV show The Street («Улица») on TNT channel.

On 26 November 2017, the video clip for the song "Somewhere Out There" («Где-то там») was released. It was trending on YouTube for two consecutive days and climbed to number one in charts.

On 24 March 2019, as part of Moscow Fashion Week, Guskova presented the album "Our Hearts" («Наши сердца») at the fashion show of Russian designer Eleonora Amosova.

On 6 August 2019, the single "Mad About You" («Заболеть тобой») was released.

On 10 January 2020, in honour of her birthday, she released the single "A Lot of Noise" («Много шума»).

=== Discography ===
==== Albums ====
Vremya (Time)

- Released: April 28, 2016
- Tracks: 12

Nashi Serdza (Our Hearts)

- Released: March 27, 2019
- Tracks: 8

==== Singles ====
Date	Title	Other Artists	Ref
2013	"Dreams Come True"	ft. DJ Groove	
January 2014	"Fly Away"	ft. Mira	
March 2015	"Time"		
October 2015	"Macho"		
April 2016	"Do Not Rush"		
March 2016	"Papa"		
December 2016	"In the Clouds"		
June 2017	"Somewhere Out There"		
October 2018	"Beware, This Is Love"		
August 2019	"Mad About You"		
January 2020	"A Lot of Noise"		

==== Music videos ====
Date	Title	Link
15 April 2014	"Dreams Come True" (ft. DJ Groove)	
30 April 2014	"Fly Away" (ft. Mira)	
12 March 2016	"Papa"	
12 May 2016	"MMF"	
27 December 2016	"In the Clouds"	
26 November 2018	"Somewhere Out There"	

== TV Journalism ==
In June 2018, Guskova received a diploma in professional television journalism, specializing in TV presenter from the First National School of Television of RSU A.N. Kosygin. She had an internship as a correspondent from 2 to 22 July 2018, in the Directorate of Information Broadcasting "MIC Izvestia". Her first interview was for the newspaper “Rublevka’s Life” with the famous volleyball player Alexander Markin.

== Philanthropy ==
Guskova is actively involved with different charities: she takes part in charity events and activities of organizations involved in the upbringing and rehabilitation of children. Her organizations include T-shirt Gives Life (Футболка дарит жизнь), City of Good (Город добра), Unlimited Reality (Безграничное реальности), Festival of Good (Фестиваль добра), Unlimited Opportunities (Безграничное возмошности), Children's Day (День зачиту детей), First Day of School, Action from Heart to Heart (Акция от сердца к сердцу), Text of Good (Смска добра), along with many others.

In November 2018, Guskova became an ambassador of the brand "Eleonora Amosova". A strong friendship between the singer and the designer has developed into a close partnership, Nadezda regularly appears at the shows, both, as a model and a VIP guest.
