= 2010 Fed Cup Americas Zone Group II – Pool A =

Group A of the 2010 Fed Cup Americas Zone Group II was one of two pools in the Americas Zone Group II of the 2010 Fed Cup. Five teams competed in a round robin competition, with the teams proceeding to their respective sections of the play-offs: the top two teams played for advancement to the 2011 Group I.

		(The Bahamas) BAH	(Dominican Republic) DOM	(Trinidad and Tobago) TRI	(Ecuador) ECU	(Costa Rica) CRC	Match; W–L	Set; W–L	Game; W–L	Standings
52	Bahamas		3–0	3–0	0–3	2–1	3–1	17–9	134–94	2
60	Dominican Republic	0–3		0–3	0–3	1–2	0–4	4–21	66–139	5
65	Trinidad and Tobago	0–3	3–0		0–3	0–3	1–3	9–20	102–151	4
69	Ecuador	3–0	3–0	3–0		3–0	4–0	24–1	146–54	1
	Costa Rica	1–2	2–1	3–0	0–3		2–2	12–15	112–122	3

== Bahamas vs. Ecuador ==
Bahamas
0
National Tennis Club, Guayaquil, Ecuador
19 April 2010
Clay (outdoors)

Ecuador
3

			1	2	3
1	(The Bahamas) (Ecuador)	Simone Pratt; Mariana Correa	1; 6	4; 6
2	(The Bahamas) (Ecuador)	Kerrie Cartwright; Marie Elise Casares	3; 6	6; 2	3; 6
3	(The Bahamas) (Ecuador)	Kerrie Cartwright / Simone Pratt; Mariana Correa / Doménica González	4; 6	2; 6

== Dominican Republic vs. Costa Rica ==
Dominican Republic
1
National Tennis Club, Guayaquil, Ecuador
19 April 2010
Clay (outdoors)

Costa Rica
2

			1	2	3
1	(Dominican Republic) (Costa Rica)	Daysi Espinal; Camila Quesada	6; 3	6; 2
2	(Dominican Republic) (Costa Rica)	Diana Espinal; Laura Víquez	1; 6	0; 6
3	(Dominican Republic) (Costa Rica)	María Clara Bernárdez / Daysi Espinal; Melissa Golfín / Camila Quesada	3; 6	1; 6

== Bahamas vs. Trinidad and Tobago ==
Bahamas
3
National Tennis Club, Guayaquil, Ecuador
20 April 2010
Clay (outdoors)

Trinidad and Tobago
0

			1	2	3
1	(The Bahamas) (Trinidad and Tobago)	Simone Pratt; Lee-Anne Lingo	6; 2	7^{7} 6^{4}
2	(The Bahamas) (Trinidad and Tobago)	Kerrie Cartwright; Olivia Bennett	6; 0	6; 0
3	(The Bahamas) (Trinidad and Tobago)	Gabrielle Moxey / Simone Pratt; Dayna Grazette / Breana Stampfli	6; 1	4; 6	6; 4

== Ecuador vs. Costa Rica ==
Ecuador
3
National Tennis Club, Guayaquil, Ecuador
20 April 2010
Clay (outdoors)

Costa Rica
0

			1	2	3
1	(Ecuador) (Costa Rica)	Mariana Correa; Camila Quesada	6; 3	6; 1
2	(Ecuador) (Costa Rica)	Marie Elise Casares; Laura Víquez	6; 2	6; 3
3	(Ecuador) (Costa Rica)	Mariana Correa / Doménica González; Melissa Golfín / María Moya	6; 2	6; 0

== Bahamas vs. Costa Rica ==
Bahamas
2
National Tennis Club, Guayaquil, Ecuador
21 April 2010
Clay (outdoors)

Costa Rica
1

			1	2	3
1	(The Bahamas) (Costa Rica)	Simone Pratt; Camila Quesada	7^{7} 6^{4}	5; 7	2; 6
2	(The Bahamas) (Costa Rica)	Kerrie Cartwright; Laura Víquez	6; 2	6; 1
3	(The Bahamas) (Costa Rica)	Kerrie Cartwright / Gabrielle Moxey; Melissa Golfín / Camila Quesada	6; 0	6; 3

== Dominican Republic vs. Trinidad and Tobago ==
Dominican Republic
0
National Tennis Club, Guayaquil, Ecuador
21 April 2010
Clay (outdoors)

Trinidad and Tobago
3

			1	2	3
1	(Dominican Republic) (Trinidad and Tobago)	Daysi Espinal; Camila Quesada	6; 3	4; 6	4; 6
2	(Dominican Republic) (Trinidad and Tobago)	Diana Espinal; Laura Víquez	1; 6	0; 6
3	(Dominican Republic) (Trinidad and Tobago)	María Clara Bernárdez / Paloma Castillo; Melissa Golfín / Camila Quesada	6; 2	1; 6	5; 7

== Dominican Republic vs. Ecuador ==
Dominican Republic
0
National Tennis Club, Guayaquil, Ecuador
22 April 2010
Clay (outdoors)

Ecuador
3

			1	2	3
1	(Dominican Republic) (Ecuador)	María Clara Bernárdez; Doménica González	1; 6	2; 6
2	(Dominican Republic) (Ecuador)	Daysi Espinal; Marie Elise Casares	4; 6	0; 6
3	(Dominican Republic) (Ecuador)	Daysi Espinal / Diana Espinal; Alejandra Álvarez / Mariana Correa	0; 6	3; 6

== Trinidad and Tobago vs. Costa Rica ==
Trinidad and Tobago
0
National Tennis Club, Guayaquil, Ecuador
22 April 2010
Clay (outdoors)

Costa Rica
3

			1	2	3
1	(Trinidad and Tobago) (Costa Rica)	Lee-Anne Lingo; Camila Quesada	7; 5	4; 6	2; 6
2	(Trinidad and Tobago) (Costa Rica)	Olivia Bennett; Laura Víquez	7; 5	1; 6	4; 6
3	(Trinidad and Tobago) (Costa Rica)	Dayna Grazette / Lee-Anne Lingo; Melissa Golfín / Camila Quesada	1; 6	5; 7

== Bahamas vs. Dominican Republic ==
Bahamas
3
National Tennis Club, Guayaquil, Ecuador
23 April 2010
Clay (outdoors)

Dominican Republic
0

			1	2	3
1	(The Bahamas) (Dominican Republic)	Simone Pratt; María Clara Bernárdez	7; 5	6; 0
2	(The Bahamas) (Dominican Republic)	Kerrie Cartwright; Daysi Espinal	6; 1	1; 0		retired
3	(The Bahamas) (Dominican Republic)	Kerrie Cartwright / Gabrielle Moxey; Paloma Castillo / Diana Espinal	6; 4	6; 2

== Trinidad and Tobago vs. Ecuador ==
Trinidad and Tobago
0
National Tennis Club, Guayaquil, Ecuador
23 April 2010
Clay (outdoors)

Ecuador
3

			1	2	3
1	(Trinidad and Tobago) (Ecuador)	Dayna Grazette; Doménica González	0; 6	2; 6
2	(Trinidad and Tobago) (Ecuador)	Olivia Bennett; Mariana Correa	4; 6	3; 6
3	(Trinidad and Tobago) (Ecuador)	Dayna Grazette / Breana Stampfli; Alejandra Álvarez / Marie Elise Casares	1; 6	0; 6

== See also ==
- Fed Cup structure
