= Nicolás Zurmendi =

Uruguayan tennis player

- Country (sports): Uruguay
- Born: 5 October 1966 (age 59) Montevideo, Uruguay

Doubles
- Career record: 0–1 (Davis Cup)
Medal record
South American Games
Gold medal – first place	1986 Santiago	Men's doubles

Nicolás Zurmendi (born 5 October 1966) is an Uruguayan former tennis player.

Zurmendi, a college tennis player at Northwestern State, partnered with Marcelo Filippini to win a gold medal for doubles at the 1986 South American Games. In the same year he was also a Uruguayan representative at the inaugural Goodwill Games, held in Moscow.

In 1990 he made a Davis Cup appearance for Uruguay, playing the doubles rubber in a tie against Peru. He and Daniel Montes de Oca were beaten by Carlos Di Laura and Jaime Yzaga, but Uruguay went on to win the tie.
