= Agustín Velotti =

Argentine tennis player

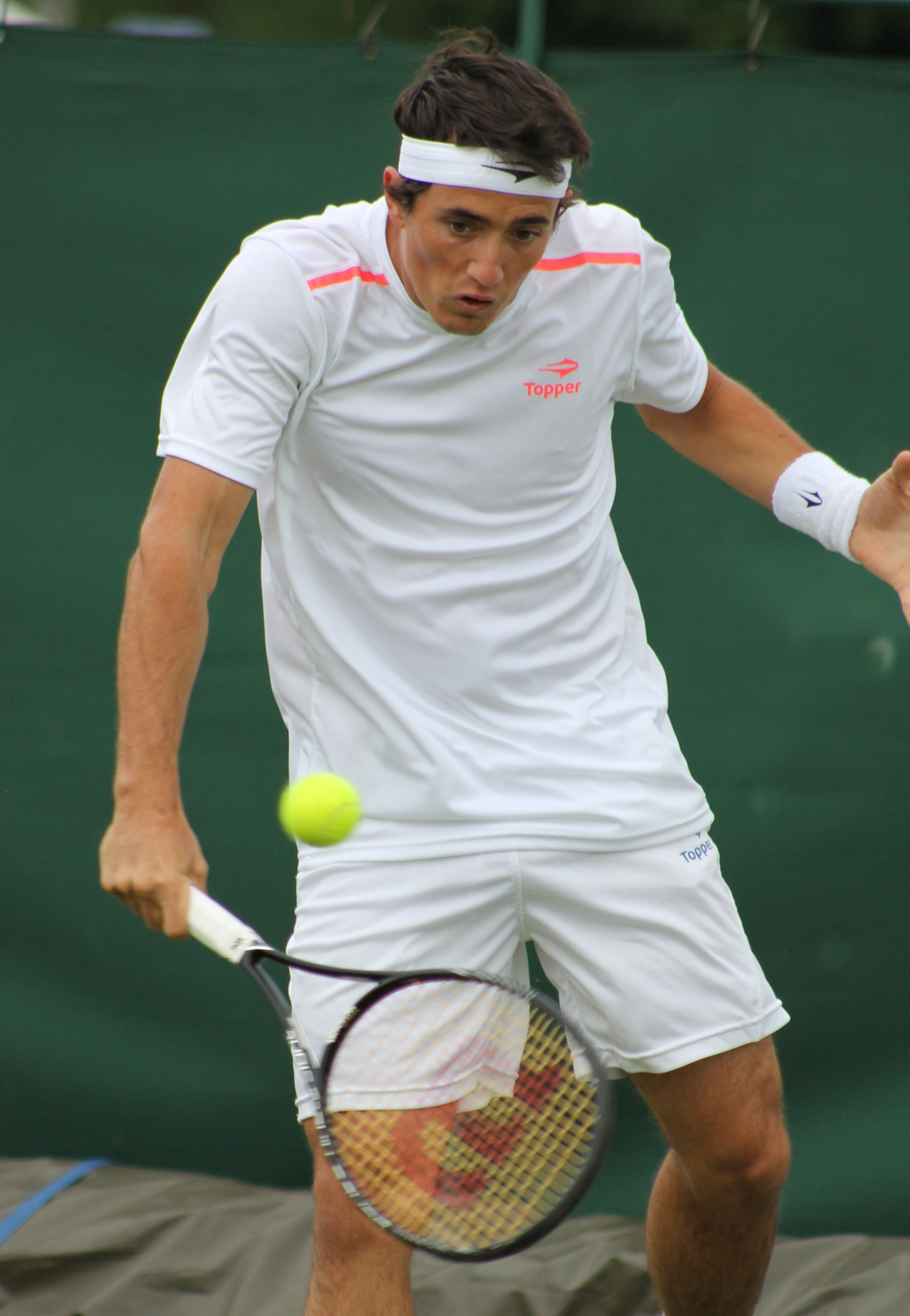
- Country (sports): Argentina
- Born: May 24, 1992 (age 34) Larroque, Argentina
- Turned pro: 2008
- Retired: 2021
- Plays: Right-handed
- Coach: Carlos Berlocq
- Prize money: US $335,776

Singles
- Career record: 0–4
- Career titles: 0
- Highest ranking: No. 166 (16 September 2013)

Grand Slam singles results
- Australian Open: Q1 (2017)
- French Open: Q2 (2011, 2013)
- Wimbledon: Q2 (2013, 2014)
- US Open: Q2 (2013)

Doubles
- Career record: 1–2
- Career titles: 0
- Highest ranking: No. 290 (17 June 2013)
Medal record
Representing Argentina
Men's Tennis
South American Games
Silver medal – second place	2010 Medellín	Men's singles
Silver medal – second place	2010 Medellín	Men's doubles

Agustín Velotti (Spanish pronunciation: [aɣusˈtim beˈloti]; (Note: In isolation, Agustín is pronounced Spanish pronunciation: [aɣusˈtin].) born May 24, 1992) is an Argentine former tennis player. He has a career-high ATP singles ranking of No. 166 achieved on 16 September 2013 and a doubles ranking of No. 290 achieved on 17 June 2013.

Velotti won the 2010 French Open Boys' singles competition after beating his good friend Andrea Collarini, 6–4, 7–5.

Previously, he had won different junior tournaments, including B16 of Buenos Aires in 2007, in 2008 the tournaments B18 G5 in Londrina, Argentina, B18 G5 in Montevideo, Uruguay, B16 Mondial Paris Cadets Trophee Lagardere in Paris, B16 Torneo Dell Avenire in Milan, B16 of Montecatini, B16 at the Copa Argentina de San Miguel, the B16 Copa Indervalle in Cali, and in 2009 the B18 Astrid Bowl in Loverval, Belgium.

As of 7 June 2010, he was ranked no. 2 in the ITF Junior Rankings.

== Futures and Challenger Career Finals ==
=== Singles: 21 (16–5) ===
Legend (singles) ATP Challenger Tour (2–0) ITF Futures Tour (14–5)	Titles by surface Hard (3–1) Clay (13–4) Grass (0–0) Carpet (0–0)

Result	W–L	Date	Tournament	Tier	Surface	Opponents	Score
Win	1–0	Oct 2010	Paraguay F2, Asunción	Futures	Clay	(Argentina) Juan-Pablo Amado	7–5, ret.
Loss	1–1	Jan 2011	El Salvador F1, Santa Tecla	Futures	Clay	(Uruguay) Marcel Felder	4–6, 6-7^{(7–9)}
Win	2–1	Apr 2011	Argentina F1, Arroyito	Futures	Clay	(Argentina) Diego Schwartzman	6–2, 6–3
Win	3–1	Aug 2011	Peru F2, Chosica	Futures	Clay	(Chile) Cristóbal Saavedra Corvalán	6–4, 6–3
Win	4–1	Aug 2011	Peru F3, Trujillo	Futures	Clay	(Peru) Duilio Beretta	6–2, 6–4
Win	5–1	Mar 2012	Argentina F4, Córdoba	Futures	Clay	(Argentina) Diego Schwartzman	6–4, 6–2
Win	6–1	Sep 2012	Brazil F27, Belém	Futures	Hard	(Brazil) Fabiano de Paula	3–6, 6–2, 6–3
Win	7–1	Aug 2013	Rio de Janeiro, Brazil	Challenger	Clay	(Slovenia) Blaž Rola	6–3, 6–4
Win	8–1	Sep 2014	Colombia F5, Ibagué	Futures	Clay	(Brazil) Fabiano de Paula	6–3, 6–1
Win	9–1	Nov 2014	Mexico F12, Huatulco	Futures	Hard	(Barbados) Darian King	6–1, 4–6, 7–5
Loss	9–2	Nov 2015	Venezuela F2, Maracay	Futures	Hard	(Serbia) Peđa Krstin	3–6, 2–6
Win	10–2	Feb 2016	Usa F6, Palm Coast	Futures	Clay	(Chile) Juan Carlos Sáez	6–4, 4–6, 6–3
Win	11–2	Aug 2016	Curitiba, Brazil	Challenger	Clay	(Brazil) André Ghem	6–0, 6–4
Loss	11–3	Nov 2017	Argentina F8, Corrientes	Futures	Clay	(Brazil) Daniel Dutra da Silva	4–6, 6-7^{(3–7)}
Win	12–3	Jan 2019	M15 Anning, China	World Tennis Tour	Clay	(Japan) Naoki Tajima	4–6, 6–3, 7–5
Win	13–3	Jan 2019	M15 Anning, China	World Tennis Tour	Clay	(Chinese Taipei) Ray Ho	6–4, 6–3
Loss	13–4	Apr 2019	M15 Orange Park, USA	World Tennis Tour	Clay	(Kazakhstan) Dmitry Popko	0–6, 7–5, 3–6
Loss	13–5	Apr 2019	M15 Buenos Aires Argentina	World Tennis Tour	Clay	(Argentina) Sebastián Báez	4–6, 0–6
Win	14–5	Jun 2019	M25 Hong Kong	World Tennis Tour	Hard	(Japan) Shintaro Imai	6–3, 6–3
Win	15–5	Sep 2020	M25 Jablonec nad Nisou Czech Rep.	World Tennis Tour	Clay	(Italy) Gianluigi Quinzi	6–2, 6–1
Win	16–5	Feb 2021	M15 Antalya, Turkey	World Tennis Tour	Clay	(Romania) Filip Cristian Jianu	6–3, 6–4

=== Doubles: 18 (11-7) ===
Legend (doubles) ATP Challenger Tour (1–2) ITF Futures Tour (10–5)	Titles by surface Hard (2–1) Clay (9–6) Grass (0–0) Carpet (0–0)

Result	W–L	Date	Tournament	Tier	Surface	Partner	Opponents	Score
Win	1–0	Aug 2008	Ecuador F1	Futures	Clay	(Argentina) Juan-Manuel Romanazzi	(Peru) Mauricio Echazú (Ecuador) Sebastian Rivera	7–6^{(7–5)}, 6–3
Win	2–0	Apr 2010	Argentina F4	Futures	Clay	(Argentina) Facundo Argüello	(Argentina) Gastón-Arturo Grimolizzi (Chile) Rodrigo Pérez	6–1, 6–1
Loss	2–1	May 2010	Argentina F5	Futures	Clay	(Argentina) Facundo Argüello	(Argentina) Diego Schwartzman (Argentina) Renzo Olivo	6–2, 2–6, [8–10]
Win	3–1	Apr 2011	Argentina F1	Futures	Clay	(Argentina) Diego Schwartzman	(Argentina) Andrés Ceppo (Argentina) Agustín Picco	6–4, 7–5
Win	4–1	Aug 2011	Peru F3	Futures	Clay	(Argentina) Joaquín-Jésus Monteferrario	(Venezuela) Luis David Martínez (Chile) Cristóbal Saavedra Corvalán	2–6, 6–4, [10–8]
Win	5–1	Jul 2012	Lima Peru	Challenger	Clay	(Argentina) Facundo Argüello	(Italy) Claudio Grassi (Italy) Luca Vanni	7–6^{(7–4)}, 7-6^{[7–5)}
Loss	5–2	Oct 2012	Buenos Aires Argentina	Challenger	Clay	(Argentina) Facundo Argüello	(Argentina) Martín Alund (Argentina) Horacio Zeballos	6–7^{(6–8)}, 2–6
Win	6–2	May 2013	Italy F10	Futures	Clay	(Argentina) Guido Andreozzi	(Netherlands) Sander Groen (Sweden) Andreas Vinciguerra	6–4, 6–1
Loss	6–3	Apr 2014	San Luis Potosí Mexico	Challenger	Clay	(Spain) Adrián Menéndez Maceiras	(United States) Kevin King (Colombia) Juan Carlos Spir	3–6, 4–6
Loss	6–4	Nov 2014	Mexico F2	Futures	Hard	(Venezuela) David Souto	(Guatemala) Christopher Díaz Figueroa (Mexico) Luis Patiño	3–6, 6–3, [6–10]
Win	7–4	Oct 2015	Venezuela F1	Futures	Hard	(Venezuela) Luis David Martínez	(Argentina) Julián Busch (Argentina) Franco Feitt	7–6^{(7–2)}, 6–1
Win	8–4	Nov 2015	Venezuela F2	Futures	Hard	(Venezuela) Luis David Martínez	(Peru) Jorge Brian Panta (Peru) Mauricio Echazú	6–3, 6–4
Loss	8–5	Oct 2018	Argentina F7	Futures	Clay	(Argentina) Mariano Kestelboim	(Peru) Alexander Merino (Argentina) Manuel Peña López	6–4, 4–6, [7–10]
Loss	8–6	Jan 2019	M15 Anning China	World Tennis Tour	Clay	(Italy) Francesco Bessire	(Japan) Naoki Tajima (Japan) Kento Takeuchi	6–4, 5–7, [7–10]
Win	9–6	Apr 2019	M15 Orange Park USA	World Tennis Tour	Clay	(Argentina) Juan Ignacio Galarza	(United States) Harrison Adams (United States) Junior Alexander Ore	7–6^{(8–6)}, 6-7^{)3-7)}, [10–5]
Loss	9–7	Apr 2019	M15 Buenos Aires Argentina	World Tennis Tour	Clay	(Argentina) Maximiliano Estévez	(Argentina) Tomás Martín Etcheverry (Argentina) Mariano Kestelboim	6–4, 4–6, [3–10]
Win	10–7	Sep 2020	M25 Pardubice Czechia	World Tennis Tour	Clay	(Uruguay) Martín Cuevas	(United States) Christian Harrison (United States) Toby Kodat	3–6, 6–3, [10–6]
Win	11–7	Feb 2021	M15 Antalya Turkey	World Tennis Tour	Clay	(Argentina) Matías Zukas	(Colombia) Nicolás Mejía (Spain) Pedro Vives Marcos	2–6, 7–5, [10–5]

== Junior Grand Slam Finals ==
=== Boys' Singles (1 title) ===
Result	Year	Tournament	Surface	Opponents	Score
Win	2010	French Open	Clay	(United States) Andrea Collarini	6–4, 7–5

=== Boys' Doubles (1 runner-up) ===
Result	Year	Tournament	Surface	Partner	Opponents	Score
Loss	2010	French Open	Clay	(Argentina) Facundo Argüello	(Peru) Duilio Beretta (Ecuador) Roberto Quiroz	3–6, 2–6
