= Rodrigo Senattore =

Uruguayan tennis player

- Country (sports): Uruguay
- Born: 28 January 1994 (age 31); Uruguay
- Plays: Right-handed
- Prize money: $10,506

Singles
- Career record: 1–2 (at ATP Tour level, Grand Slam level, and in Davis Cup)
- Career titles: 0
- Highest ranking: No. 984 (24 November 2014)

Doubles
- Career record: 0–0 (at ATP Tour level, Grand Slam level, and in Davis Cup)
- Career titles: 0
- Highest ranking: No. 710 (15 December 2014)
- Last updated on: 17 January 2021.

Rodrigo Senattore (born 28 January 1994) is a Uruguayan tennis player.

Senattore has a career high ATP singles ranking of 1332 achieved on 21 May 2018. He also has a career high ATP doubles ranking of 710 achieved on 17 December 2018.

Senattore has a career-high ITF juniors ranking of 231, achieved on 9 April 2012.

Senattore represented Uruguay at the 2013 and 2014 Davis Cup, where he has a W/L record of 1–2.

== Davis Cup ==
=== Participations: (1–2) ===
Group membership World Group (0–0) WG Play-off (0–0) Group I (1–2) Group II (0–0) Group III (0–0) Group IV (0–0)	Matches by surface Hard (1–2) Clay (0–0) Grass (0–0) Carpet (0–0)	Matches by type Singles (1–2) Doubles (0–0)

- ▲ ▼ indicates the outcome of the Davis Cup match followed by the score, date, place of event, the zonal classification and its phase, and the court surface.
