= Patricia Kú Flores =

Peruvian tennis player (born 1993)

- Full name: Patricia Iveth Kú Flores
- Country (sports): Peru
- Born: 17 December 1993 (age 32) Lima, Peru
- Height: 1.70 m (5 ft 7 in)
- Prize money: $29,175

Singles
- Career record: 112–51
- Career titles: 4 ITF
- Highest ranking: No. 327 (1 April 2013)

Grand Slam singles results
- French Open Junior: 2R (2011)
- Wimbledon Junior: 1R (2011)
- US Open Junior: 1R (2011)

Doubles
- Career record: 44–30
- Career titles: 4 ITF
- Highest ranking: No. 456 (29 October 2012)

Grand Slam doubles results
- French Open Junior: QF (2011)
- Wimbledon Junior: 1R (2011)
- US Open Junior: 1R (2011)

Team competitions
- Fed Cup: 13–10

Patricia Iveth Kú Flores (Latin American Spanish: [paˈtɾisja ˈku ˈfloɾes]; born 17 December 1993) is a Peruvian former tennis player.

She won four singles and four doubles titles on the ITF Women's Circuit. On 1 April 2013, she reached her best singles ranking of world No. 327. On 29 October 2012, she peaked at No. 456 in the doubles rankings.

Since her debut for the Peru Fed Cup team in 2010, Kú Flores has a win–loss record of 13–10 in the competition.

== ITF finals ==
=== Singles (4–6) ===
Legend $25,000 tournaments $10,000 tournaments	Finals by surface Hard (0–1) Clay (4–5)

Outcome	No.	Date	Tournament	Surface	Opponent	Score
Runner-up	1.	8 November 2010	Bogotá, Colombia	Hard	(Chile) Andrea Koch Benvenuto	1–6, 5–7
Runner-up	2.	8 August 2011	São Paulo, Brazil	Clay	(Brazil) Nathália Rossi	2–6, 3–6
Winner	1.	24 October 2011	Bogotá, Colombia	Clay	(Chile) Cecilia Costa Melgar	6–7^{(6)}, 7–5, 6–3
Runner-up	3.	2 April 2012	Villa María, Argentina	Clay	(Argentina) Vanesa Furlanetto	3–6, 4–6
Runner-up	4.	9 April 2012	Villa del Dique, Argentina	Clay	(Chile) Daniela Seguel	6–1, 0–6, 5–7
Runner-up	5.	30 April 2012	Trujillo, Peru	Clay	(Ukraine) Anastasia Kharchenko	6–4, 2–6, 3–6
Winner	2.	16 July 2012	Cochabamba, Bolivia	Clay	(Mexico) Victoria Lozano	6–0, 6–4
Winner	3.	13 August 2012	Trujillo, Peru	Clay	(Chile) Fernanda Brito	6–3, 6–7^{(5)}, 6–3
Winner	4.	20 August 2012	Lima, Peru	Clay	(Brazil) Maria Fernanda Alves	6–4, 6–4
Runner-up	6.	11 November 2013	Lima, Peru	Clay	(Chile) Andrea Koch Benvenuto	5–7, 7–6^{(4)}, 2–6

=== Doubles (4–5) ===
Outcome	No.	Date	Tournament	Surface	Partner	Opponents	Score
Winner	1.	24 October 2011	Bogotá, Colombia	Clay	(Peru) Katherine Miranda Chang	(Chile) Cecilia Costa Melgar (Chile) Belén Ludueña	6–4, 7–5
Winner	2.	7 November 2011	Medellín, Colombia	Clay	(Peru) Katherine Miranda Chang	(Slovakia) Martina Frantová (United States) Libby Muma	6–4, 7–6^{(7–4)}
Winner	3.	19 March 2012	Rancagua, Chile	Clay	(Chile) Daniela Seguel	(Chile) Fernanda Brito (Brazil) Raquel Piltcher	7–6^{(7–2)}, 7–5
Winner	4.	2 April 2012	Villa María, Argentina	Clay	(Chile) Daniela Seguel	(Bolivia) María Fernanda Álvarez Terán (Chile) Camila Silva	4–6, 6–1, [10–4]
Runner-up	1.	16 April 2012	Arequipa, Peru	Clay	(Peru) Katherine Miranda Chang	(United States) Erin Clark (Peru) Ingrid Várgas Calvo	6–7^{(2–7)}, 5–7
Runner-up	2.	30 July 2012	Santa Cruz de la Sierra, Bolivia	Clay	(Mexico) Victoria Lozano	(United States) Erin Clark (Argentina) Luciana Sarmenti	6–7^{(4–7)}, 4–6
Runner-up	3.	13 August 2012	Trujillo, Peru	Clay	(Peru) Katherine Miranda Chang	(Argentina) Aranza Salut (Mexico) Ana Sofía Sánchez	6–3, 1–6, [9–11]
Runner-up	4.	10 September 2012	Pereira, Colombia	Clay	(Venezuela) Gabriela Coglitore	(Chile) Cecilia Costa Melgar (Ukraine) Anastasia Kharchenko	1–6, 0–6
Runner-up	5.	21 January 2013	Lima, Peru	Clay	(Peru) Katherine Miranda Chang	(Brazil) Maria Fernanda Alves (Argentina) Vanesa Furlanetto	1–6, 4–6
