= Netherlands Antilles at the South American Games =

- Flag of the Netherlands Antilles
- IOC code: AHO
- NOC: Nederlands Antilliaans Olympisch Comité
- Medals: Gold 7 Silver 7 Bronze 17 Total 31

South American Games appearances (overview)
- 1994; 1998; 2002; 2006; 2010; 2014–2018; 2022

Netherlands Antilles first entered the competition at the 1994 games in Valencia, Venezuela and have participated in all but one edition in 1998.

The Netherlands Antilles usually send the smallest delegations at the games but have still managed to get a total of seven gold medals in only four editions.

== Medal count ==
=== Medals by games ===
Games	Gold	Silver	Bronze	Total
1994 Valencia	3	5	5	13
2002 Brazil	3	2	7	12
2006 Buenos Aires	0	0	2	2
2010 Medellin	1	0	3	4
Totals (4 entries)	7	7	17	31

== See also ==
- South American Games
