= Yamile Fors Guerra =

Cuban tennis player

- Country (sports): Cuba
- Born: 11 May 1977 (age 48)
- Turned pro: 1998
- Retired: 2011
- Prize money: $14,610

Singles
- Career record: 42 - 37
- Career titles: 1 ITF
- Highest ranking: No. 733 (24 July 2006)

Doubles
- Career record: 69 - 27
- Career titles: 10 ITF
- Highest ranking: No. 421 (24 July 2006)

Yamile Fors Guerra (born 11 May 1977) is a Cuban retired female tennis player.

Fors Guerra won one singles title and ten doubles titles on the ITF Circuit. On 24 July 2006, she reached her best singles ranking of world No. 733. On 24 July 2006, she peaked at No. 421 in the doubles rankings.

Playing for Cuba in the Fed Cup, Fors Guerra has a win–loss record of 46–33.

== ITF finals ==
=== Singles (1–1) ===
| Legend $25,000 tournaments $10,000 tournaments | Finals by surface Hard (1–1) Clay (0–0) |

| Result | Date | Location | Surface | Opponent | Score |
|---|---|---|---|---|---|
| Win | 1 August 2005 | Puerto Ordaz, Venezuela | Hard | (Cuba) Yanet Núñez Mojarena | 7–5, 6–4 |
| Loss | 4 December 2005 | Havana, Cuba | Hard | (Argentina) Florencia Molinero | 4–6, 3–6 |

=== Doubles (10–3) ===
| Legend $25,000 tournaments $10,000 tournaments | Finals by surface Hard (10–2) Clay (0–1) |

| Result | Date | Tier | Location | Surface | Partner | Opponents | Score |
|---|---|---|---|---|---|---|---|
| Win | 12 August 2002 | 10,000 | Poza Rica, Mexico | Hard | (Cuba) Yanet Núñez Mojarena | (Russia) Alena Dvornikova (Russia) Anastasia Dvornikova | 6–4, 3–6, 6–0 |
| Win | 1 August 2005 | 10,000 | Puerto Ordaz, Venezuela | Hard | (Cuba) Yanet Núñez Mojarena | (Cuba) Lumay Díaz Hernández (Venezuela) Marina Giral Lores | 6–1, 6–2 |
| Loss | 25 October 2005 | 25,000 | Mexico City, Mexico | Hard | (Cuba) Yanet Núñez Mojarena | (Argentina) Soledad Esperón (Republic of Ireland) Kelly Liggan | 6–1, 4–6, 3–6 |
| Win | 28 November 2005 | 10,000 | Havana, Cuba | Hard | (Cuba) Yanet Núñez Mojarena | (United States) Julianna Gates (United States) Chrissie Seredni | 6–3, 6–2 |
| Win | 3 July 2006 | 10,000 | Valencia, Venezuela | Hard | (Cuba) Yanet Núñez Mojarena | (Uruguay) Estefanía Craciún (Venezuela) Mariana Muci | 6–4, 6–4 |
| Loss | 12 September 2006 | 10,000 | Caracas, Venezuela | Clay | (Cuba) Yanet Núñez Mojarena | (Argentina) Flavia Mignola (Argentina) Luciana Sarmenti | 4–6, 1–6 |
| Win | 27 November 2006 | 10,000 | Havana, Cuba | Hard | (Cuba) Yanet Núñez Mojarena | (Cuba) Lumay Díaz Hernández (Guatemala) Melissa Morales | 6–3, 6–1 |
| Loss | 3 December 2007 | 10,000 | Havana, Cuba | Hard | (Cuba) Yanet Núñez Mojarena | (Poland) Monika Krauze (Netherlands) Bibiane Weijers | 4–6, 4–6 |
| Win | 1 December 2008 | 10,000 | Havana, Cuba | Hard | (Cuba) Lumay Díaz Hernández | (Israel) Ester Masuri (Slovakia) Katarína Poljaková | 7–6^{(4)}, 6–3 |
| Win | 6 December 2010 | 10,000 | Havana, Cuba | Hard | (Cuba) Misleydis Díaz González | (United Kingdom) Jennifer Allan (Russia) Nadejda Guskova | 6–1, 6–2 |
| Win | 18 April 2001 | 10,000 | Caracas, Venezuela | Hard | (Cuba) Misleydis Díaz González | (Ukraine) Anastasia Kharchenko (Belarus) Viktoryia Kisialeva | 3–6, 6–3, 6–4 |
| Win | 27 June 2001 | 10,000 | Havana, Cuba | Hard | (Cuba) Misleydis Díaz González | (Argentina) Andrea Benítez (United States) Margaret Lumia | 6–2, 6–2 |
| Win | 4 July 2001 | 10,000 | Havana, Cuba | Hard | (Cuba) Misleydis Díaz González | (United Kingdom) Nicola George (Austria) Jeannine Prentner | 6–4, 6–1 |
