= Chile at the South American Games =

- Flag of Chile
- IOC code: CHI
- NOC: Comité Olímpico de Chile
- Medals Ranked 5th: Gold 391 Silver 487 Bronze 597 Total 1,475

South American Games appearances (overview)
- 1978; 1982; 1986; 1990; 1994; 1998; 2002; 2006; 2010; 2014; 2018; 2022

Chile was one of the founding members of the South American Games participating in the very first edition held in La Paz, Bolivia in 1978.

Chile is represented by the Chilean Olympic Committee and have host this event twice in 1986 and 2014 in the city of Santiago de Chile

== Medal count ==
=== Medals by games ===
Games	Gold	Silver	Bronze	Total
1978 La Paz	31	25	20	76
1982 Rosario	37	51	47	135
1986 Santiago	50	66	60	176
1990 Lima	40	38	60	138
1994 Valencia	16	20	37	73
1998 Cuenca	29	54	46	129
2002 Brazil	24	41	46	111
2006 Buenos Aires	37	42	58	137
2010 Medellin	25	32	52	109
2014 Santiago	27	52	50	129
2018 Cochabamba	37	34	60	131
2022 Asuncion	38	32	61	131
Totals (12 entries)	391	487	597	1,475
