= Argentina at the South American Games =

- Flag of Argentina
- IOC code: ARG
- NOC: Comité Olímpico Argentino
- Medals Ranked 1st: Gold 884 Silver 756 Bronze 728 Total 2,368

South American Games appearances (overview)
- 1978; 1982; 1986; 1990; 1994; 1998; 2002; 2006; 2010; 2014; 2018; 2022

Argentina was one of the founding members of the South American Games participating in the very first edition held in La Paz, Bolivia in 1978. It is the most successful country in the competition having a total of 2044 medals and has led the medal table seven times in nine editions.

Argentina is represented by the Argentine Olympic Committee and have host this event twice in 1982 and 2006 in the cities of Rosario and Buenos Aires respectively.

== Medal count ==
=== Medals by games ===
Games	Gold	Silver	Bronze	Total
1978 La Paz	91	53	45	189
1982 Rosario	114	92	66	272
1986 Santiago	80	40	45	165
1990 Lima	68	73	46	187
1994 Valencia	105	61	52	218
1998 Cuenca	101	60	74	235
2002 Brazil	76	89	80	245
2006 Buenos Aires	107	96	93	296
2010 Medellin	54	76	107	237
2014 Santiago	46	56	57	159
2018 Cochabamba	42	60	63	165
Totals (11 entries)	884	756	728	2,368

=== Medals by sport ===
Sport	Gold	Silver	Bronze	Total
Athletics	60	48	34	142
Boxing	20	21	31	72
Handball	3	1	0	4
Basketball	2	1	0	3
Field Hockey	2	0	0	2
Football	2	0	0	2
Volleyball	2	0	0	2
Baseball	0	1	2	3
Futsal	0	1	1	2
Roller hockey	0	1	0	1
Totals (10 entries)	91	74	68	233
