= Isabella Robbiani =

Paraguayan tennis player

- Country (sports): Paraguay
- Born: 30 March 1992 (age 33) Asunción, Paraguay
- Height: 1.57 m (5 ft 2 in)
- Plays: Right-handed
- Prize money: $28,759

Singles
- Highest ranking: No. 486 (14 May 2012)

Doubles
- Career titles: 1 ITF
- Highest ranking: No. 494 (6 August 2012)

Isabella Robbiani (born 30 March 1992) is a Paraguayan former professional tennis player.

A right-handed player from Asunción, Robbiani played in five Fed Cup ties for Paraguay between 2010 and 2012. She represented Paraguay at the 2011 Pan American Games, where she made the second round of the singles.

As a professional player, Robbiani was ranked inside the world's top 500 for both singles and doubles. Her only title came in the doubles at Lima in 2012.

Robbiani, who is based in Florida, played college tennis for the Saint Leo University after leaving the tour in 2013.

== ITF finals ==
=== Doubles: 5 (1–4) ===
Result	No.	Date	Tournament	Surface	Partner	Opponents	Score
Loss	1.	6 December 2008	Buenos Aires, Argentina	Clay	(Chile) Catalina Arancibia	(Argentina) Carla Beltrami (Argentina) María Irigoyen	0–6, 2–6
Loss	2.	20 May 2011	Itaparica, Brazil	Hard	(Argentina) Luciana Sarmenti	(Chile) Cecilia Costa Melgar (Brazil) Flávia Guimarães Bueno	3–6, 6–3, [8–10]
Loss	3.	1 August 2011	São Paulo, Brazil	Clay	(India) Kyra Shroff	(Brazil) Carla Forte (Brazil) Beatriz Haddad Maia	7–6^{(5)}, 3–6, [7–10]
Loss	4.	26 March 2012	Ribeirão Preto, Brazil	Clay	(Argentina) Carolina Zeballos	(Brazil) Carla Forte (Brazil) Gabriela Cé	1–6, 6–3, [7–10]
Win	1.	23 April 2012	Lima, Peru	Clay	(Brazil) Liz Tatiane Koehler	(United States) Elizabeth Ferris (Ukraine) Anastasia Kharchenko	7–5, 6–7^{(4)}, [10–4]
