= Cecilia Costa Melgar =

Chilean tennis player (born 1992)

- Full name: Cecilia Raquel Costa Melgar
- Country (sports): Chile
- Born: 26 December 1992 (age 33) Viña del Mar, Chile
- Height: 1.60 m (5 ft 3 in)
- Prize money: $47,890

Singles
- Career record: 137–109
- Career titles: 4 ITF
- Highest ranking: No. 367 (20 May 2013)

Grand Slam singles results
- French Open Junior: Q2 (2010)
- Wimbledon Junior: 1R (2010)

Doubles
- Career record: 111–91
- Career titles: 7 ITF
- Highest ranking: No. 216 (8 September 2014)

Grand Slam doubles results
- Wimbledon Junior: 1R (2010)

Team competitions
- Fed Cup: 15–6
Medal record
Representing Chile
South American Games
| Gold medal – first place | 2010 Medellín | women's singles |
| Gold medal – first place | 2010 Medellín | women's doubles |

Cecilia Raquel Costa Melgar (born 26 December 1992) is a Chilean former tennis player.

Costa Melgar won four singles and seven doubles titles on the ITF Women's Circuit. On 20 May 2013, she reached her best singles ranking of world No. 367. On 8 September 2014, she peaked at No. 216 in the doubles rankings.

Since her debut for Chile in 2010, Costa Melgar has realized a 15–6 record for her country in Fed Cup competition.

After retiring from professional tennis, Costa Melgar became a beach tennis player.

== ITF finals ==
=== Singles: 10 (4–6) ===
| Legend $10,000 tournaments | Finals by surface Clay (4–6) |

| Result | No. | Date | Tournament | Surface | Opponent | Score |
|---|---|---|---|---|---|---|
| Loss | 1. | Aug 2008 | ITF Bell Ville, Argentina | Clay | (Argentina) Verónica Spiegel | 1–6, 1–6 |
| Loss | 2. | Oct 2011 | ITF Bogotá, Colombia | Clay | (Peru) Patricia Kú Flores | 7–6^{(6)}, 5–7, 3–6 |
| Loss | 3. | Jul 2012 | ITF La Paz, Bolivia | Clay | (Argentina) Guadalupe Moreno | 5–7, 3–6 |
| Loss | 4. | Aug 2012 | ITF Santa Cruz, Bolivia | Clay | (Chile) Camila Silva | 4–6, 7–6^{(1)}, 3–6 |
| Win | 1. | Sep 2012 | ITF Pereira, Colombia | Clay | (Ukraine) Anastasia Kharchenko | 6–2, 6–3 |
| Win | 2. | Sep 2012 | ITF Bogotá, Colombia | Clay | (Colombia) Yuliana Lizarazo | 1–6, 6–3, 6–4 |
| Win | 3. | Oct 2012 | ITF Santiago, Chile | Clay | (Chile) Daniela Seguel | 6–4, 6–2 |
| Loss | 5. | Nov 2012 | ITF Quillota, Chile | Clay | (Chile) Camila Silva | 5–7, 6–4, 1–6 |
| Win | 4. | Aug 2013 | ITF La Paz, Bolivia | Clay | (Chile) Macarena Olivares López | 4–6, 6–1, 6–1 |
| Loss | 6. | Nov 2013 | ITF Santiago, Chile | Clay | (Argentina) Nadia Podoroska | 2–6, 7–5, 5–3 ret. |

=== Doubles: 17 (7–10) ===
| Legend $25,000 tournaments $10,000 tournaments | Finals by surface Hard (1–1) Clay (6–9) |

| Result | No. | Date | Tournament | Surface | Partner | Opponents | Score |
|---|---|---|---|---|---|---|---|
| Win | 1. | Nov 2009 | ITF Lima, Peru | Clay | (Chile) Andrea Koch Benvenuto | (Argentina) Agustina Eskenazi (Argentina) Paula Ormaechea | 6–1, 6–3 |
| Win | 2. | May 2011 | ITF Itaparica, Brazil | Hard | (Brazil) Flávia Guimarães Bueno | (Paraguay) Isabella Robbiani (Argentina) Luciana Sarmenti | 6–3, 3–6, [10–8] |
| Loss | 1. | Aug 2011 | ITF Versmold, Germany | Clay | (Chile) Daniela Seguel | (Ukraine) Elizaveta Ianchuk (Italy) Julia Mayr | 4–6, 3–6 |
| Loss | 2. | Oct 2011 | ITF São Paulo, Brazil | Clay | (Brazil) Gabriela Cé | (Brazil) Maria Fernanda Alves (Brazil) Karina Venditti | 2–6, 4–6 |
| Loss | 3. | Oct 2011 | ITF Bogotá, Colombia | Clay | (Chile) Belén Ludueña | (Peru) Patricia Kú Flores (Peru) Katherine Miranda Chang | 4–6, 5–7 |
| Loss | 4. | Mar 2012 | ITF Puebla, Mexico | Hard | (Brazil) Flávia Guimarães Bueno | (Mexico) Ivette López (Mexico) Ana Paula de la Peña | 1–6, 6–7^{(0)} |
| Win | 3. | Sep 2012 | ITF Pereira, Colombia | Clay | (Ukraine) Anastasia Kharchenko | (Venezuela) Gabriela Coglitore (Peru) Patricia Kú Flores | 6–1, 6–0 |
| Loss | 5. | Oct 2012 | ITF Santiago, Chile | Clay | (Chile) Daniela Seguel | (Argentina) Aranza Salut (Argentina) Carolina Zeballos | 6–4, 4–6, [8–10] |
| Win | 4. | Oct 2012 | ITF Santiago, Chile | Clay | (Chile) Daniela Seguel | (Argentina) Ornella Caron (Argentina) Aranza Salut | 6–3, 6–4 |
| Win | 5. | Nov 2012 | ITF Quillota, Chile | Clay | (Chile) Camila Silva | (Argentina) Sofía Luini (Argentina) Bárbara Montiel | 6–1, 6–1 |
| Loss | 6. | Aug 2013 | ITF Santa Cruz, Bolivia | Clay | (Paraguay) Camila Giangreco Campiz | (Bolivia) María Fernanda Álvarez Terán (Bolivia) Daniela Ruiz | 5–7, 3–6 |
| Win | 6. | Sep 2013 | ITF Mont-de-Marsan, France | Clay | (Chile) Daniela Seguel | (France) Alizé Lim (France) Laura Thorpe | 6–4, 6–2 |
| Loss | 7. | Sep 2013 | ITF Seville, Spain | Clay | (Italy) Gaia Sanesi | (Brazil) Paula Cristina Gonçalves (Argentina) Florencia Molinero | 3–6, 5–7 |
| Loss | 8. | Oct 2013 | ITF Casablanca, Morocco | Clay | (Italy) Anastasia Grymalska | (Poland) Paula Kania (Russia) Valeria Solovyeva | 6–7^{(3)}, 4–6 |
| Loss | 9. | Dec 2013 | ITF Santiago, Chile | Clay | (Chile) Daniela Seguel | (Paraguay) Verónica Cepede Royg (Argentina) María Irigoyen | 6–2, 4–6, [5–10] |
| Win | 7. | Jul 2014 | ITF Knokke, Belgium | Clay | (Spain) Aliona Bolsova | (Belgium) Justine De Sutter (Belgium) Sofie Oyen | 4–6, 6–3, [10–4] |
| Loss | 10. | Oct 2014 | ITF Lima, Peru | Clay | (Brazil) Nathaly Kurata | (Argentina) Sofía Luini (Argentina) Guadalupe Pérez Rojas | 4–6, 3–6 |
