= 2010 Fed Cup World Group II play-offs =

Part of tennis tournament

The 2010 World Group II play-offs were four ties which involved the losing nations of the World Group II and four nations from the three Zonal Group I competitions. Nations that won their play-off ties entered the 2011 World Group II, while losing nations joined their respective zonal groups.

== Poland vs. Spain ==
Poland
1
Sopot Tennis Club, Sopot, Poland
24–25 April 2010
Taraflex (indoor)

Spain
4

| | | | 1 | 2 | 3 |
|---|---|---|---|---|---|
| 1 | (Poland) (Spain) | Agnieszka Radwańska; Carla Suárez Navarro | 6; 3 | 6; 1 |
| 2 | (Poland) (Spain) | Marta Domachowska; María José Martínez Sánchez | 6^{4} 7^{7} | 2; 6 |
| 3 | (Poland) (Spain) | Agnieszka Radwańska; María José Martínez Sánchez | 3; 6 | 4; 6 |
| 4 | (Poland) (Spain) | Marta Domachowska; Carla Suárez Navarro | 3; 6 | 2; 6 |
| 5 | (Poland) (Spain) | Klaudia Jans / Alicja Rosolska; Nuria Llagostera Vives / Arantxa Parra Santonja | 2; 6 | 4; 6 |

== Sweden vs. China ==
Sweden
3
Idrottens Hus, Helsingborg, Sweden
25–26 April 2010
Plexipave (indoor)

China
2

| | | | 1 | 2 | 3 |
|---|---|---|---|---|---|
| 1 | (Sweden) (China) | Johanna Larsson; Peng Shuai | 6; 2 | 6; 4 |
| 2 | (Sweden) (China) | Sofia Arvidsson; Zhang Shuai | 6; 4 | 6; 3 |
| 3 | (Sweden) (China) | Sofia Arvidsson; Peng Shuai | 7^{7} 6^{4} | 1; 6 | 6; 8 |
| 4 | (Sweden) (China) | Johanna Larsson; Zhang Shuai | 2; 6 | 6; 2 | 6; 3 |
| 5 | (Sweden) (China) | Ellen Allgurin / Johanna Larsson; Han Xinyun / Zhou Yimiao | 3; 6 | 2; 6 |

== Canada vs. Argentina ==
Canada
5
Uniprix Stadium, Montreal, Canada
24–25 April 2010
Taraflex Tennis ATP (indoor)

Argentina
0

| | | | 1 | 2 | 3 |
|---|---|---|---|---|---|
| 1 | (Canada) (Argentina) | Aleksandra Wozniak; Paula Ormaechea | 6; 4 | 6; 2 |
| 2 | (Canada) (Argentina) | Valérie Tétreault; Jorgelina Cravero | 6; 4 | 6; 3 |
| 3 | (Canada) (Argentina) | Aleksandra Wozniak; Jorgelina Cravero | 6; 4 | 6; 4 |
| 4 | (Canada) (Argentina) | Valérie Tétreault; Paula Ormaechea | 6^{6} 7^{8} | 6; 1 | 6; 1 |
| 5 | (Canada) (Argentina) | Sharon Fichman / Marie-Ève Pelletier; Jorgelina Cravero / Aranza Salut | 6; 4 | 6; 2 |

== Slovenia vs. Japan ==
Slovenia
4
Ljudski vrt, Maribor, Slovenia
24–25 April 2010
Red clay (indoor)

Japan
1

| | | | 1 | 2 | 3 |
|---|---|---|---|---|---|
| 1 | (Slovenia) (Japan) | Katarina Srebotnik; Kimiko Date-Krumm | 7; 5 | 6; 1 |
| 2 | (Slovenia) (Japan) | Polona Hercog; Ayumi Morita | 3; 6 | 6; 1 | 6; 3 |
| 3 | (Slovenia) (Japan) | Polona Hercog; Kimiko Date-Krumm | 4; 6 | 2; 6 |
| 4 | (Slovenia) (Japan) | Katarina Srebotnik; Ayumi Morita | 6; 1 | 6; 4 |
| 5 | (Slovenia) (Japan) | Tadeja Majerič / Maša Zec Peškirič; Rika Fujiwara / Yurika Sema | 6; 4 | 6^{1} 7^{7} | 6; 3 |
