= Lambaré =

Lambaré Lambare
- City
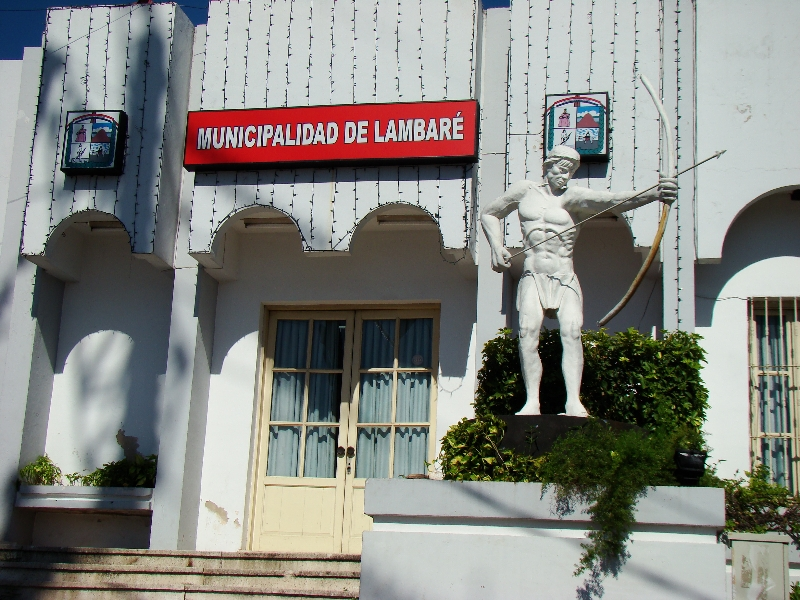

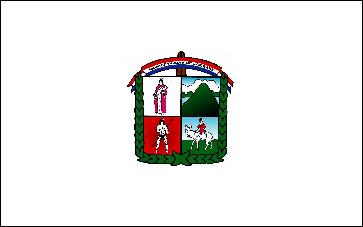
- Flag

- Location within Paraguay
- Coordinates: 25°19′48″S 57°38′24″W
- Country: Paraguay
- Department: Central
- Established: 1766

Area
  - Total: 26.7 km^{2} (10.3 sq mi)

Population (2022)
  - Total: 127,150
  - Density: 4,760/km^{2} (12,300/sq mi)
- Area code: 021
- Climate: Cfa

Lambaré (Spanish pronunciation: [lambaˈɾe]; Guarani: Lambare) is a city in Central Department, Paraguay, forming part of the Greater Asuncion metropolitan area. It covers an area of 27 km^{2} (10 sq mi) and had a population of 127,150 inhabitants according to the 2022 national census, making it the eighth-most populous city in the country.

== History ==
Before the Spanish colonialists arrived in Paraguay in the early 16th century, the area was inhabited by Carian people, part of Guaranís. There were several tribes, led by tribal chieftains. The expedition of Juan de Ayolas arrived in 1535 with 160 men, at a natural port used by the Cario, situated in a small bay at the foot of a hill. That port, known as Casaccia, is considered the site of the first Spanish landing, later became part of the territory of Asunción and is identified with the early history of Lambaré. The place was commanded by the chieftain Avambaré, whose name later became the name of the settlement and later was transformed in Lambare.

In 1766, Lambaré was officially founded by Carlos Morphi, the Governor of Paraguay in service of the Spanish Crown. Following the independence of Paraguay, it was created as an independent municipality, which was formalised by Law No. 791 enacted on 5 June 1962 by the government of Alfredo Stroessner. Mariano Escauriza Fernández served as the first president of the municipal council. On 31 July 1965, it was elevated to a first-category municipality by Executive Decree No. 12756. The parish church of Lambaré was erected in the colonial period, first functioning as a chapel and from 1769 appearing in records as a vicariate of the cathedral. In 1849, president Carlos Antonio López announced the completion of the temple of Lambaré.

== Geography ==
Lambaré is located in the Central Department of Paraguay, forming part of the Greater Asuncion metropolitan area. It covers an area of 26.77 km^{2} (10.34 sq mi).

== Demographics ==
According to the 2022 census carried out by the Instituto Nacional de Estadística (INE), Lambaré had a total population of 127,150 inhabitants, making it the eighth-most populous city in the country. The population consisted of 65,799 females and 61,351 males. The median age of the population was 33 years.
