= 2012 ITF Women's Circuit (April–June) =

The 2012 ITF Women's Circuit was the 2012 edition of the second tier tour for women's professional tennis. It is organised by the International Tennis Federation and is a tier below the WTA Tour. The ITF Women's Circuit includes tournaments with prize money ranging from $10,000 up to $100,000.

== Key ==
$100,000 tournaments
$75,000 tournaments
$50,000 tournaments
$25,000 tournaments
$15,000 tournaments
$10,000 tournaments

== Month ==
=== April ===
Week of	Tournament	Winner	Runners-up	Semifinalists	Quarterfinalists
April 2	Torrent, Spain; Clay $10,000; Singles and doubles draws	(Spain) Andrea Lázaro García; 6–0, 3–6, 4–1, retired	(Italy) Giulia Gatto-Monticone	(Spain) Pilar Domínguez López (Latvia) Jeļena Ostapenko	(Spain) Yvonne Cavallé Reimers (Italy) Benedetta Davato (Russia) Nanuli Pipiya (Spain) Silvia García Jiménez
April 2	Torrent, Spain; Clay $10,000; Singles and doubles draws	(Spain) Yvonne Cavallé Reimers (Spain) Isabel Rapisarda Calvo; 4–6, 7–6^{(7–5)}, [10–8]	(Belarus) Ksenia Milevskaya (Russia) Anastasia Mukhametova	(Spain) Pilar Domínguez López (Latvia) Jeļena Ostapenko	(Spain) Yvonne Cavallé Reimers (Italy) Benedetta Davato (Russia) Nanuli Pipiya (Spain) Silvia García Jiménez
April 2	Heraklion, Greece; Carpet $10,000; Singles and doubles draws	(Croatia) Silvia Njirić; 6–3, 6–4	(Serbia) Tamara Čurović	(Italy) Alice Savoretti (Italy) Giulia Sussarello	(Greece) Maria Sakkari (Poland) Agata Barańska (Romania) Patricia Maria Țig (Romania) Diana Marcu
April 2	Heraklion, Greece; Carpet $10,000; Singles and doubles draws	(Czech Republic) Martina Borecká (Czech Republic) Petra Krejsová; 6–0, 6–0	(North Macedonia) Lina Gjorcheska (Greece) Despoina Vogasari	(Italy) Alice Savoretti (Italy) Giulia Sussarello	(Greece) Maria Sakkari (Poland) Agata Barańska (Romania) Patricia Maria Țig (Romania) Diana Marcu
April 2	Tessenderlo, Belgium; Clay $25,000; Singles and doubles draws	(Ukraine) Maryna Zanevska; 6–2, 6–2	(Germany) Tatjana Malek	(Ukraine) Elina Svitolina (Russia) Vesna Dolonc	(Czech Republic) Sandra Záhlavová (Italy) Nastassja Burnett (Belgium) Alison Van Uytvanck (Belgium) Kirsten Flipkens
April 2	Tessenderlo, Belgium; Clay $25,000; Singles and doubles draws	(Netherlands) Demi Schuurs (Ukraine) Maryna Zanevska; 6–4, 6–3	(Germany) Tatjana Malek (Liechtenstein) Stephanie Vogt	(Ukraine) Elina Svitolina (Russia) Vesna Dolonc	(Czech Republic) Sandra Záhlavová (Italy) Nastassja Burnett (Belgium) Alison Van Uytvanck (Belgium) Kirsten Flipkens
April 2	Antalya-Belconti, Turkey; Hard $10,000; Singles and doubles draws	(Slovakia) Anna Karolína Schmiedlová; 7–5, 6–2	(Germany) Anna-Lena Friedsam	(China) Lu Jiajing (Slovakia) Chantal Škamlová	(Germany) Katharina Lehnert (United States) Noelle Hickey (Ukraine) Ganna Poznikhirenko (Ukraine) Valeriya Strakhova
April 2	Antalya-Belconti, Turkey; Hard $10,000; Singles and doubles draws	(China) Lu Jiajing (China) Lu Jiaxiang; 6–1, 6–0	(United Kingdom) Lucy Brown (United Kingdom) Tara Moore	(China) Lu Jiajing (Slovakia) Chantal Škamlová	(Germany) Katharina Lehnert (United States) Noelle Hickey (Ukraine) Ganna Poznikhirenko (Ukraine) Valeriya Strakhova
April 2	Jackson, United States; Clay $25,000; Singles and doubles draws	(Canada) Heidi El Tabakh; 6–0, 6–4	(Russia) Elena Bovina	(Japan) Misaki Doi (United States) Chiara Scholl	(Puerto Rico) Monica Puig (Croatia) Tereza Mrdeža (Australia) Sacha Jones (Canada) Marie-Ève Pelletier
April 2	Jackson, United States; Clay $25,000; Singles and doubles draws	(Russia) Elena Bovina (Croatia) Tereza Mrdeža; 6–3, 6–3	(Argentina) Mailen Auroux (Argentina) María Irigoyen	(Japan) Misaki Doi (United States) Chiara Scholl	(Puerto Rico) Monica Puig (Croatia) Tereza Mrdeža (Australia) Sacha Jones (Canada) Marie-Ève Pelletier
April 2	Ribeirão Preto, Brazil; Hard $10,000; Singles and doubles draws	(Brazil) Beatriz Haddad Maia; 6–0, 6–1	(South Africa) Natasha Fourouclas	(Paraguay) Isabella Robbiani (Brazil) Gabriela Cé	(Brazil) Natasha Lotuffo (Brazil) Nathaly Kurata (Brazil) Carla Forte (Argentina) Carolina Zeballos
April 2	Ribeirão Preto, Brazil; Hard $10,000; Singles and doubles draws	(Chile) Fernanda Brito (Brazil) Raquel Piltcher; 6–3, 5–7, [10–7]	(Brazil) Gabriela Cé (Brazil) Carla Forte	(Paraguay) Isabella Robbiani (Brazil) Gabriela Cé	(Brazil) Natasha Lotuffo (Brazil) Nathaly Kurata (Brazil) Carla Forte (Argentina) Carolina Zeballos
April 2	Villa María, Argentina; Clay $10,000; Singles and doubles draws	(Argentina) Vanesa Furlanetto; 6–3, 6–4	(Peru) Patricia Kú Flores	(Ecuador) Doménica González (Chile) Daniela Seguel	(Argentina) Guadalupe Moreno (Argentina) Ana Victoria Gobbi Monllau (Chile) Camila Silva (Serbia) Saška Gavrilovska
April 2	Villa María, Argentina; Clay $10,000; Singles and doubles draws	(Peru) Patricia Kú Flores (Chile) Daniela Seguel; 4–6, 6–1, [10–4]	(Bolivia) María Fernanda Álvarez Terán (Chile) Camila Silva	(Ecuador) Doménica González (Chile) Daniela Seguel	(Argentina) Guadalupe Moreno (Argentina) Ana Victoria Gobbi Monllau (Chile) Camila Silva (Serbia) Saška Gavrilovska
April 2	Šibenik, Croatia; Clay $10,000; Singles and doubles draws	(Croatia) Indire Akiki; 7–5, 6–2	(Slovenia) Tjaša Šrimpf	(Sweden) Hilda Melander (Croatia) Dijana Banoveć	(Slovenia) Polona Reberšak (Croatia) Ivana Klepić (Czech Republic) Martina Kubičíková (Croatia) Neda Koprčina
April 2	Šibenik, Croatia; Clay $10,000; Singles and doubles draws	(Ukraine) Sofiya Kovalets (Sweden) Hilda Melander; 2–1, retired	(Hungary) Vaszilisza Bulgakova (Germany) Anne Schäfer	(Sweden) Hilda Melander (Croatia) Dijana Banoveć	(Slovenia) Polona Reberšak (Croatia) Ivana Klepić (Czech Republic) Martina Kubičíková (Croatia) Neda Koprčina
April 2	Manama, Bahrain; Hard $10,000; Singles and doubles draws	(France) Lou Brouleau; 7–5, 6–1	(Bulgaria) Aleksandrina Naydenova	(Oman) Fatma Al Nabhani (Australia) Abbie Myers	(Chile) Andrea Koch Benvenuto (Germany) Verena Schmid (Russia) Margarita Lazareva (United States) Katie Ruckert
April 2	Manama, Bahrain; Hard $10,000; Singles and doubles draws	(Australia) Abbie Myers (Russia) Anna Tyulpa; 6–3, 3–6, [13–11]	(Russia) Yana Sizikova (Germany) Anna Zaja	(Oman) Fatma Al Nabhani (Australia) Abbie Myers	(Chile) Andrea Koch Benvenuto (Germany) Verena Schmid (Russia) Margarita Lazareva (United States) Katie Ruckert
April 2	Algiers, Algeria; Clay $10,000; Singles and doubles draws	(Switzerland) Conny Perrin; 6–3, 6–0	(Austria) Yvonne Neuwirth	(France) Amandine Cazeaux (Russia) Alexandra Romanova	(Morocco) Fatima El Allami (Belgium) Valerie Verhamme (Egypt) Mai El Kamash (Germany) Alina Wessel
April 2	Algiers, Algeria; Clay $10,000; Singles and doubles draws	(Russia) Alexandra Romanova (Germany) Alina Wessel; 4–6, 6–1, [12–10]	(Morocco) Fatima El Allami (Italy) Costanza Mecchi	(France) Amandine Cazeaux (Russia) Alexandra Romanova	(Morocco) Fatima El Allami (Belgium) Valerie Verhamme (Egypt) Mai El Kamash (Germany) Alina Wessel
April 9	ITF Women's Circuit – Wenshan; Wenshan, China; Hard $50,000; Singles – Doubles	(Chinese Taipei) Hsieh Su-wei; 6–3, 6–3	(China) Zheng Saisai	(Japan) Junri Namigata (China) Xu Yifan	(Indonesia) Ayu Fani Damayanti (Belgium) Tamaryn Hendler (China) Liu Fangzhou (Bulgaria) Aleksandrina Naydenova
April 9	ITF Women's Circuit – Wenshan; Wenshan, China; Hard $50,000; Singles – Doubles	(Chinese Taipei) Hsieh Shu-ying (Chinese Taipei) Hsieh Su-wei; 6–3, 6–2	(China) Liu Wanting (China) Xu Yifan	(Japan) Junri Namigata (China) Xu Yifan	(Indonesia) Ayu Fani Damayanti (Belgium) Tamaryn Hendler (China) Liu Fangzhou (Bulgaria) Aleksandrina Naydenova
April 9	Pelham, United States; Clay $25,000; Singles and doubles draws	(Canada) Heidi El Tabakh; 3–6, 6–2, 6–4	(Romania) Edina Gallovits-Hall	(Portugal) Michelle Larcher de Brito (Colombia) Mariana Duque	(United States) Tetiana Luzhanska (Australia) Sacha Jones (Argentina) Florencia Molinero (United States) Coco Vandeweghe
April 9	Pelham, United States; Clay $25,000; Singles and doubles draws	(France) Julie Coin (Canada) Marie-Ève Pelletier; 7–5, 6–4	(Russia) Elena Bovina (Russia) Ekaterina Bychkova	(Portugal) Michelle Larcher de Brito (Colombia) Mariana Duque	(United States) Tetiana Luzhanska (Australia) Sacha Jones (Argentina) Florencia Molinero (United States) Coco Vandeweghe
April 9	Hvar, Croatia; Clay $10,000; Singles and doubles draws	(Czech Republic) Tereza Smitková; 2–6, 6–4, 6–2	(Croatia) Karla Popović	(Croatia) Bernarda Pera (Ukraine) Sofiya Kovalets	(Hungary) Csilla Borsányi (Poland) Barbara Sobaszkiewicz (Israel) Evgenia Linetskaya (Hungary) Ágnes Bukta
April 9	Hvar, Croatia; Clay $10,000; Singles and doubles draws	(Czech Republic) Martina Kubičíková (Czech Republic) Tereza Smitková; 6–2, 6–4	(Czech Republic) Tereza Martincová (Czech Republic) Petra Rohanová	(Croatia) Bernarda Pera (Ukraine) Sofiya Kovalets	(Hungary) Csilla Borsányi (Poland) Barbara Sobaszkiewicz (Israel) Evgenia Linetskaya (Hungary) Ágnes Bukta
April 9	Antalya-Belconti, Turkey; Hard $10,000; Singles and doubles draws	(United States) Nicole Melichar; 6–4, 6–3	(Turkey) Hülya Esen	(China) Liu Chang (China) Lu Jiajing	(United Kingdom) Francesca Stephenson (Russia) Natalia Orlova (Romania) Elena-Teodora Cadar (Russia) Yana Buchina
April 9	Antalya-Belconti, Turkey; Hard $10,000; Singles and doubles draws	(Turkey) Hülya Esen (Turkey) Lütfiye Esen; 1–6, 6–4, [10–8]	(China) Lu Jiajing (China) Lu Jiaxiang	(China) Liu Chang (China) Lu Jiajing	(United Kingdom) Francesca Stephenson (Russia) Natalia Orlova (Romania) Elena-Teodora Cadar (Russia) Yana Buchina
April 9	Heraklion, Greece; Carpet $10,000; Singles and doubles draws	(Croatia) Silvia Njirić; 6–4, 7–6^{(7–4)}	(Italy) Angelica Moratelli	(Russia) Ksenia Kirillova (Slovakia) Michaela Pochabová	(Romania) Patricia Maria Țig (Serbia) Tamara Čurović (Czech Republic) Martina Borecká (Italy) Alice Balducci
April 9	Heraklion, Greece; Carpet $10,000; Singles and doubles draws	(Czech Republic) Martina Borecká (Czech Republic) Petra Krejsová; 6–2, 6–3	(North Macedonia) Lina Gjorcheska (Greece) Despoina Vogasari	(Russia) Ksenia Kirillova (Slovakia) Michaela Pochabová	(Romania) Patricia Maria Țig (Serbia) Tamara Čurović (Czech Republic) Martina Borecká (Italy) Alice Balducci
April 9	Caracas, Venezuela; Hard $10,000; Singles and doubles draws	(United States) Jennifer Elie; 6–1, 6–2	(United States) Lauren Albanese	(Slovakia) Zuzana Zlochová (United States) Nicole Robinson	(Venezuela) Carmen Blanco (Venezuela) Ana Gabriela Gerbasi (The Bahamas) Simone Pratt (Venezuela) María Andrea Cárdenas
April 9	Caracas, Venezuela; Hard $10,000; Singles and doubles draws	(United States) Lauren Albanese (Slovakia) Zuzana Zlochová; 6–2, 6–3	(Brazil) Marcela Bueno (Brazil) Flávia Guimarães Bueno	(Slovakia) Zuzana Zlochová (United States) Nicole Robinson	(Venezuela) Carmen Blanco (Venezuela) Ana Gabriela Gerbasi (The Bahamas) Simone Pratt (Venezuela) María Andrea Cárdenas
April 9	Villa del Dique, Argentina; Clay $10,000; Singles and doubles draws	(Chile) Daniela Seguel; 1–6, 6–0, 7–5	(Peru) Patricia Kú Flores	(Argentina) Luciana Sarmenti (Argentina) Victoria Bosio	(Bolivia) María Fernanda Álvarez Terán (Argentina) Tatiana Búa (Argentina) Francesca Rescaldani (Argentina) Vanesa Furlanetto
April 9	Villa del Dique, Argentina; Clay $10,000; Singles and doubles draws	(Argentina) Vanesa Furlanetto (Argentina) Aranza Salut; Walkover	(Bolivia) María Fernanda Álvarez Terán (Argentina) Ornella Caron	(Argentina) Luciana Sarmenti (Argentina) Victoria Bosio	(Bolivia) María Fernanda Álvarez Terán (Argentina) Tatiana Búa (Argentina) Francesca Rescaldani (Argentina) Vanesa Furlanetto
April 9	Fujairah, United Arab Emirates; Hard $10,000; Singles and doubles draws	(Oman) Fatma Al Nabhani; 6–3, 6–2	(India) Ankita Raina	(Austria) Barbara Haas (Sweden) Matilda Hamlin	(India) Sharon Sanchana Paul (Russia) Yana Sizikova (India) Kyra Shroff (Russia) Julia Samuseva
April 9	Fujairah, United Arab Emirates; Hard $10,000; Singles and doubles draws	(Russia) Yana Sizikova (Germany) Anna Zaja; 6–4, 6–1	(Oman) Fatma Al Nabhani (India) Kyra Shroff	(Austria) Barbara Haas (Sweden) Matilda Hamlin	(India) Sharon Sanchana Paul (Russia) Yana Sizikova (India) Kyra Shroff (Russia) Julia Samuseva
April 9	Pomezia, Italy; Clay $10,000; Singles and doubles draws	(Belarus) Aliaksandra Sasnovich; 0–6, 6–1, 6–1	(Romania) Raluca Olaru	(Latvia) Jeļena Ostapenko (Italy) Anastasia Grymalska	(Italy) Agnese Zucchini (Germany) Anne Schäfer (Brazil) Teliana Pereira (Italy) Carolina Pillot
April 9	Pomezia, Italy; Clay $10,000; Singles and doubles draws	(Peru) Bianca Botto (Brazil) Teliana Pereira; 7–6^{(7–3)}, 6–2	(Italy) Benedetta Davato (Germany) Anne Schäfer	(Latvia) Jeļena Ostapenko (Italy) Anastasia Grymalska	(Italy) Agnese Zucchini (Germany) Anne Schäfer (Brazil) Teliana Pereira (Italy) Carolina Pillot
April 9	Tlemcen, Algeria; Clay $10,000; Singles and doubles draws	(Montenegro) Danka Kovinić; 6–2, 6–2	(Russia) Alexandra Romanova	(Austria) Yvonne Neuwirth (Finland) Johanna Hyöty	(Belgium) Catherine Chantraine (France) Fiona Gervais (Germany) Alina Wessel (Serbia) Danijela Tomić
April 9	Tlemcen, Algeria; Clay $10,000; Singles and doubles draws	(Russia) Alexandra Romanova (Germany) Alina Wessel; 7–5, 5–7, [12–10]	(Finland) Johanna Hyöty (Finland) Ella Leivo	(Austria) Yvonne Neuwirth (Finland) Johanna Hyöty	(Belgium) Catherine Chantraine (France) Fiona Gervais (Germany) Alina Wessel (Serbia) Danijela Tomić
April 16	Dothan Pro Tennis Classic; Dothan, United States; Clay $50,000; Singles – Doubles	(Italy) Camila Giorgi; 6–2, 4–6, 6–4	(Romania) Edina Gallovits-Hall	(United States) Lauren Davis (United States) Julia Cohen	(United States) Jill Craybas (Croatia) Mirjana Lučić-Baroni (Russia) Valeria Solovyeva (Japan) Misaki Doi
April 16	Dothan Pro Tennis Classic; Dothan, United States; Clay $50,000; Singles – Doubles	(Canada) Eugenie Bouchard (United States) Jessica Pegula; 6–4, 4–6, [10–5]	(Canada) Sharon Fichman (Canada) Marie-Ève Pelletier	(United States) Lauren Davis (United States) Julia Cohen	(United States) Jill Craybas (Croatia) Mirjana Lučić-Baroni (Russia) Valeria Solovyeva (Japan) Misaki Doi
April 16	Civitavecchia, Italy; Clay $25,000; Singles and doubles draws	(Spain) María Teresa Torró Flor; 3–6, 7–5, 6–2	(Ukraine) Yuliya Beygelzimer	(Brazil) Teliana Pereira (Germany) Kathrin Wörle	(Netherlands) Richèl Hogenkamp (Italy) Gioia Barbieri (Italy) Nastassja Burnett (Italy) Karin Knapp
April 16	Civitavecchia, Italy; Clay $25,000; Singles and doubles draws	(Romania) Elena Bogdan (Romania) Raluca Olaru; 6–3, 7–5	(Italy) Claudia Giovine (Russia) Marina Shamayko	(Brazil) Teliana Pereira (Germany) Kathrin Wörle	(Netherlands) Richèl Hogenkamp (Italy) Gioia Barbieri (Italy) Nastassja Burnett (Italy) Karin Knapp
April 16	Namangan, Uzbekistan; Hard $25,000; Singles and doubles draws	(Russia) Olga Puchkova; 3–6, 6–3, 6–2	(Croatia) Donna Vekić	(Ukraine) Veronika Kapshay (Ukraine) Irina Buryachok	(United Kingdom) Naomi Broady (Australia) Monique Adamczak (Russia) Marta Sirotkina (Uzbekistan) Nigina Abduraimova
April 16	Namangan, Uzbekistan; Hard $25,000; Singles and doubles draws	(Georgia (country)) Oksana Kalashnikova (Russia) Marta Sirotkina; 6–2, 7–5	(United Kingdom) Naomi Broady (Poland) Paula Kania	(Ukraine) Veronika Kapshay (Ukraine) Irina Buryachok	(United Kingdom) Naomi Broady (Australia) Monique Adamczak (Russia) Marta Sirotkina (Uzbekistan) Nigina Abduraimova
April 16	Bol, Croatia; Clay $10,000; Singles and doubles draws	(France) Anaïs Laurendon; 6–4, 4–6, 6–3	(Croatia) Bernarda Pera	(Croatia) Neda Koprčina (Czech Republic) Tereza Martincová	(Poland) Barbara Sobaszkiewicz (Czech Republic) Jesika Malečková (Croatia) Karla Popović (Slovakia) Vivien Juhászová
April 16	Bol, Croatia; Clay $10,000; Singles and doubles draws	(Italy) Nicole Clerico (France) Anaïs Laurendon; 6–2, 6–0	(Czech Republic) Jesika Malečková (Czech Republic) Tereza Smitková	(Croatia) Neda Koprčina (Czech Republic) Tereza Martincová	(Poland) Barbara Sobaszkiewicz (Czech Republic) Jesika Malečková (Croatia) Karla Popović (Slovakia) Vivien Juhászová
April 16	Les Franqueses del Vallès, Spain; Hard $10,000; Singles and doubles draws	(Belarus) Ksenia Milevskaya; 7–5, 6–7^{(5–7)}, 6–4	(Belarus) Anastasiya Yakimova	(Poland) Patrycja Sanduska (Venezuela) Andrea Gámiz	(Russia) Eugeniya Pashkova (France) Estelle Guisard (Spain) Isabel Rapisarda Calvo (Spain) Yvonne Cavallé Reimers
April 16	Les Franqueses del Vallès, Spain; Hard $10,000; Singles and doubles draws	(Germany) Carolin Daniels (Russia) Eugeniya Pashkova; 6–4, 6–3	(India) Sharmada Balu (China) He Sirui	(Poland) Patrycja Sanduska (Venezuela) Andrea Gámiz	(Russia) Eugeniya Pashkova (France) Estelle Guisard (Spain) Isabel Rapisarda Calvo (Spain) Yvonne Cavallé Reimers
April 16	Heraklion, Greece; Carpet $10,000; Singles and doubles draws	(Italy) Alice Savoretti; 6–2, 3–6, 6–3	(Spain) Nuria Párrizas Díaz	(Germany) Jasmin Steinherr (Russia) Ksenia Kirillova	(Poland) Natalia Siedliska (Slovakia) Michaela Pochabová (Italy) Alice Balducci (Italy) Andreea Văideanu
April 16	Heraklion, Greece; Carpet $10,000; Singles and doubles draws	(Czech Republic) Petra Krejsová (Croatia) Silvia Njirić; 6–7^{(7–9)}, 6–3, [10–6]	(Czech Republic) Dana Machálková (Czech Republic) Tereza Malíková	(Germany) Jasmin Steinherr (Russia) Ksenia Kirillova	(Poland) Natalia Siedliska (Slovakia) Michaela Pochabová (Italy) Alice Balducci (Italy) Andreea Văideanu
April 16	Antalya-Belconti, Turkey; Hard $10,000; Singles and doubles draws	(Russia) Yana Buchina; 6–3, 6–4	(Germany) Nicola Geuer	(United States) Nicole Melichar (China) Lu Jiajing	(Turkey) Sultan Gönen (Serbia) Jovana Jakšić (United Kingdom) Lisa Whybourn (Austria) Melanie Klaffner
April 16	Antalya-Belconti, Turkey; Hard $10,000; Singles and doubles draws	(Germany) Nicola Geuer (Austria) Janina Toljan; 6–2, 6–2	(United States) Lauren Megale (United States) Nicole Melichar	(United States) Nicole Melichar (China) Lu Jiajing	(Turkey) Sultan Gönen (Serbia) Jovana Jakšić (United Kingdom) Lisa Whybourn (Austria) Melanie Klaffner
April 16	Caracas, Venezuela; Hard $10,000; Singles and doubles draws	(United States) Jennifer Elie; 6–4, 2–6, 6–4	(Venezuela) Marina Giral Lores	(Slovakia) Zuzana Zlochová (United States) Lauren Albanese	(The Bahamas) Simone Pratt (Mexico) Sarahí García Carrera (Brazil) Karina Venditti (Brazil) Marcela Bueno
April 16	Caracas, Venezuela; Hard $10,000; Singles and doubles draws	(Venezuela) María Andrea Cárdenas (United States) Jennifer Elie; 6–3, 4–6, [10–3]	(Venezuela) Luicelena Pérez (Brazil) Karina Venditti	(Slovakia) Zuzana Zlochová (United States) Lauren Albanese	(The Bahamas) Simone Pratt (Mexico) Sarahí García Carrera (Brazil) Karina Venditti (Brazil) Marcela Bueno
April 16	Arequipa, Peru; Clay $10,000; Singles and doubles draws	(Germany) Karolina Nowak; 3–6, 6–2, 6–3	(United States) Elizabeth Ferris	(Paraguay) Isabella Robbiani (Peru) Patricia Kú Flores	(Switzerland) Louise Boinay (Brazil) Liz Tatiane Koehler Bogarin (Ukraine) Anastasia Kharchenko (Peru) Ingrid Várgas Calvo
April 16	Arequipa, Peru; Clay $10,000; Singles and doubles draws	(United States) Erin Clark (Peru) Ingrid Várgas Calvo; 7–6^{(7–2)}, 7–5	(Peru) Patricia Kú Flores (Peru) Katherine Miranda Chang	(Paraguay) Isabella Robbiani (Peru) Patricia Kú Flores	(Switzerland) Louise Boinay (Brazil) Liz Tatiane Koehler Bogarin (Ukraine) Anastasia Kharchenko (Peru) Ingrid Várgas Calvo
April 16	Villa del Dique, Argentina; Clay $10,000; Singles and doubles draws	(Chile) Daniela Seguel; 7–5, 6–1	(Argentina) Victoria Bosio	(Brazil) Nathália Rossi (Argentina) Aranza Salut	(Serbia) Saška Gavrilovska (Argentina) Francesca Rescaldani (Argentina) Catalina Pella (Argentina) Tatiana Búa
April 16	Villa del Dique, Argentina; Clay $10,000; Singles and doubles draws	(Argentina) Luciana Sarmenti (Chile) Daniela Seguel; 6–4, 5–7, [10–5]	(Argentina) Sofía Luini (Argentina) Guadalupe Pérez Rojas	(Brazil) Nathália Rossi (Argentina) Aranza Salut	(Serbia) Saška Gavrilovska (Argentina) Francesca Rescaldani (Argentina) Catalina Pella (Argentina) Tatiana Búa
April 16	Muscat, Oman; Hard $10,000; Singles and doubles draws	(Germany) Anna Zaja; 6–2, 6–2	(France) Laëtitia Sarrazin	(Russia) Julia Samuseva (France) Lou Brouleau	(Oman) Fatma Al Nabhani (Russia) Evgeniya Svintsova (India) Kyra Shroff (India) Ankita Raina
April 16	Muscat, Oman; Hard $10,000; Singles and doubles draws	(India) Kyra Shroff (Russia) Yana Sizikova; 6–2, 6–4	(Austria) Barbara Haas (France) Laëtitia Sarrazin	(Russia) Julia Samuseva (France) Lou Brouleau	(Oman) Fatma Al Nabhani (Russia) Evgeniya Svintsova (India) Kyra Shroff (India) Ankita Raina
April 23	Boyd Tinsley Women's Clay Court Classic; Charlottesville, United States; Clay $50,000; Singles – Doubles	(United States) Melanie Oudin; 7–6^{(7–0)}, 3–6, 6–1	(United States) Irina Falconi	(United States) Julia Cohen (United States) Coco Vandeweghe	(Portugal) Michelle Larcher de Brito (South Africa) Chanel Simmonds (United States) Maria Sanchez (United States) Gail Brodsky
April 23	Boyd Tinsley Women's Clay Court Classic; Charlottesville, United States; Clay $50,000; Singles – Doubles	(United States) Maria Sanchez (United States) Yasmin Schnack; 6–2, 6–2	(Russia) Elena Bovina (Israel) Julia Glushko	(United States) Julia Cohen (United States) Coco Vandeweghe	(Portugal) Michelle Larcher de Brito (South Africa) Chanel Simmonds (United States) Maria Sanchez (United States) Gail Brodsky
April 23	Vic, Spain; Clay $10,000; Singles and doubles draws	(Belarus) Ksenia Milevskaya; 6–4, 6–2	(Belarus) Anastasiya Yakimova	(United Kingdom) Amanda Carreras (Spain) Andrea Lázaro García	(Russia) Eugeniya Pashkova (Spain) Pilar Domínguez López (Mexico) Ximena Hermoso (Italy) Giulia Gatto-Monticone
April 23	Vic, Spain; Clay $10,000; Singles and doubles draws	(Russia) Eugeniya Pashkova (Bulgaria) Isabella Shinikova; 6–1, 6–2	(United Kingdom) Amanda Carreras (Mexico) Ximena Hermoso	(United Kingdom) Amanda Carreras (Spain) Andrea Lázaro García	(Russia) Eugeniya Pashkova (Spain) Pilar Domínguez López (Mexico) Ximena Hermoso (Italy) Giulia Gatto-Monticone
April 23	Bournemouth, United Kingdom; Clay $10,000; Singles and doubles draws	(United Kingdom) Jade Windley; 6–3, 6–1	(United Kingdom) Naomi Broady	(Serbia) Milana Špremo (United States) Caitlin Whoriskey	(United Kingdom) Harriet Dart (France) Elixane Lechemia (United Kingdom) Lucy Brown (France) Sherazad Benamar
April 23	Bournemouth, United Kingdom; Clay $10,000; Singles and doubles draws	(Germany) Carolin Daniels (Germany) Dejana Raickovic; 6–4, 6–3	(Republic of Ireland) Amy Bowtell (United Kingdom) Lucy Brown	(Serbia) Milana Špremo (United States) Caitlin Whoriskey	(United Kingdom) Harriet Dart (France) Elixane Lechemia (United Kingdom) Lucy Brown (France) Sherazad Benamar
April 23	Antalya-Belconti, Turkey; Hard $10,000; Singles and doubles draws	(Russia) Elizaveta Kulichkova; 7–5, 6–2	(Slovenia) Dalila Jakupović	(Russia) Maria Mokh (United Kingdom) Lisa Whybourn	(Russia) Natalia Orlova (United States) Sylvia Krywacz (Japan) Kaori Onishi (Austria) Janina Toljan
April 23	Antalya-Belconti, Turkey; Hard $10,000; Singles and doubles draws	(Georgia (country)) Oksana Kalashnikova (Georgia (country)) Sofia Kvatsabaia; 6–4, 6–4	(Romania) Ana Bogdan (Russia) Maria Mokh	(Russia) Maria Mokh (United Kingdom) Lisa Whybourn	(Russia) Natalia Orlova (United States) Sylvia Krywacz (Japan) Kaori Onishi (Austria) Janina Toljan
April 23	San Severo, Italy; Clay $10,000; Singles and doubles draws	(Italy) Anastasia Grymalska; 4–6, 6–1, 6–1	(France) Myrtille Georges	(Serbia) Teodora Mirčić (Italy) Claudia Giovine	(Italy) Carolina Pillot (Kazakhstan) Anna Danilina (Georgia (country)) Ekaterine Gorgodze (Austria) Tina Schiechtl
April 23	San Severo, Italy; Clay $10,000; Singles and doubles draws	(Italy) Anastasia Grymalska (Serbia) Teodora Mirčić; 6–2, 6–4	(Italy) Chiara Mendo (Italy) Giulia Sussarello	(Serbia) Teodora Mirčić (Italy) Claudia Giovine	(Italy) Carolina Pillot (Kazakhstan) Anna Danilina (Georgia (country)) Ekaterine Gorgodze (Austria) Tina Schiechtl
April 23	Andijan, Uzbekistan; Hard $10,000; Singles and doubles draws	(Uzbekistan) Sabina Sharipova; 6–2, 6–4	(South Korea) Jang Su-jeong	(Russia) Sabina Kurbanova (Russia) Daria Mironova	(Ukraine) Anastasiya Vasylyeva (Uzbekistan) Vlada Ekshibarova (Russia) Ekaterina Yashina (Israel) Keren Shlomo
April 23	Andijan, Uzbekistan; Hard $10,000; Singles and doubles draws	(Uzbekistan) Albina Khabibulina (Ukraine) Anastasiya Vasylyeva; 6–0, 6–2	(Uzbekistan) Sabina Sharipova (Russia) Ekaterina Yashina	(Russia) Sabina Kurbanova (Russia) Daria Mironova	(Ukraine) Anastasiya Vasylyeva (Uzbekistan) Vlada Ekshibarova (Russia) Ekaterina Yashina (Israel) Keren Shlomo
April 23	São Paulo, Brazil; Clay $10,000; Singles and doubles draws	(Venezuela) Gabriela Paz; 6–4, 6–2	(Brazil) Gabriela Cé	(Brazil) Carla Forte (Chile) Fernanda Brito	(Brazil) Nathália Rossi (Brazil) Priscila García (Brazil) Yasmine Guimarães (Brazil) Nathaly Kurata
April 23	São Paulo, Brazil; Clay $10,000; Singles and doubles draws	(Brazil) Ana Clara Duarte (Venezuela) Gabriela Paz; 5–7, 6–3, [10–5]	(Brazil) Gabriela Cé (Brazil) Carla Forte	(Brazil) Carla Forte (Chile) Fernanda Brito	(Brazil) Nathália Rossi (Brazil) Priscila García (Brazil) Yasmine Guimarães (Brazil) Nathaly Kurata
April 23	Caracas, Venezuela; Hard $25,000; Singles and doubles draws	(Venezuela) Adriana Pérez; 6–1, 6–1	(Brazil) Teliana Pereira	(Paraguay) Verónica Cepede Royg (Argentina) Mailen Auroux	(Argentina) María Irigoyen (Slovakia) Zuzana Zlochová (Bulgaria) Aleksandrina Naydenova (France) Alizé Lim
April 23	Caracas, Venezuela; Hard $25,000; Singles and doubles draws	(Argentina) Mailen Auroux (Argentina) María Irigoyen; 6–4, 6–3	(Paraguay) Verónica Cepede Royg (Venezuela) Adriana Pérez	(Paraguay) Verónica Cepede Royg (Argentina) Mailen Auroux	(Argentina) María Irigoyen (Slovakia) Zuzana Zlochová (Bulgaria) Aleksandrina Naydenova (France) Alizé Lim
April 23	Chosica–Lima, Peru; Clay $10,000; Singles and doubles draws	(Mexico) Ana Sofía Sánchez; 7–5, 6–1	(Ukraine) Anastasia Kharchenko	(Brazil) Liz Tatiane Koehler Bogarin (Peru) Patricia Kú Flores	(Germany) Karolina Nowak (Argentina) Ana Madcur (United States) Elizabeth Ferris (Argentina) Carolina Zeballos
April 23	Chosica–Lima, Peru; Clay $10,000; Singles and doubles draws	(Brazil) Liz Tatiane Koehler Bogarin (Paraguay) Isabella Robbiani; 7–5, 6–7^{(4–7)}, [10–4]	(United States) Elizabeth Ferris (Ukraine) Anastasia Kharchenko	(Brazil) Liz Tatiane Koehler Bogarin (Peru) Patricia Kú Flores	(Germany) Karolina Nowak (Argentina) Ana Madcur (United States) Elizabeth Ferris (Argentina) Carolina Zeballos
April 23	Tunis, Tunisia; Clay $25,000; Singles and doubles draws	(Poland) Sandra Zaniewska; 6–4, 4–6, 6–2	(Tunisia) Ons Jabeur	(Netherlands) Bibiane Schoofs (Netherlands) Richèl Hogenkamp	(Croatia) Ana Savić (Spain) Inés Ferrer Suárez (Russia) Marina Shamayko (Romania) Elena Bogdan
April 23	Tunis, Tunisia; Clay $25,000; Singles and doubles draws	(Romania) Elena Bogdan (Romania) Raluca Olaru; 6–4, 6–3	(Spain) Inés Ferrer Suárez (Netherlands) Richèl Hogenkamp	(Netherlands) Bibiane Schoofs (Netherlands) Richèl Hogenkamp	(Croatia) Ana Savić (Spain) Inés Ferrer Suárez (Russia) Marina Shamayko (Romania) Elena Bogdan
April 23	Rethymno, Greece; Hard $10,000; Singles and doubles draws	(Czech Republic) Dana Machálková; 6–4, 6–4	(Spain) Nuria Párrizas Díaz	(Denmark) Karen Barbat (Bulgaria) Borislava Botusharova	(Italy) Andreea Văideanu (Italy) Angelica Moratelli (Hungary) Csilla Argyelán (Greece) Despoina Vogasari
April 23	Rethymno, Greece; Hard $10,000; Singles and doubles draws	(Czech Republic) Petra Krejsová (Croatia) Silvia Njirić; 3–6, 6–3, [10–7]	(Greece) Adreanna Christopoulou (Greece) Irini Papageorgiou	(Denmark) Karen Barbat (Bulgaria) Borislava Botusharova	(Italy) Andreea Văideanu (Italy) Angelica Moratelli (Hungary) Csilla Argyelán (Greece) Despoina Vogasari
April 30	Audi Melbourne Pro Tennis Classic; Indian Harbour Beach, United States; Clay $50,000; Singles – Doubles	(United States) Grace Min; 6–4, 7–6^{(7–4)}	(United States) Maria Sanchez	(United States) Krista Hardebeck (United States) Lauren Davis	(United States) Allie Kiick (United States) Chiara Scholl (Canada) Marie-Ève Pelletier (Canada) Heidi El Tabakh
April 30	Audi Melbourne Pro Tennis Classic; Indian Harbour Beach, United States; Clay $50,000; Singles – Doubles	(Brazil) Maria Fernanda Alves (Australia) Jessica Moore; 6–7^{(6–8)}, 6–3, [10–8]	(Canada) Marie-Ève Pelletier (Ukraine) Alyona Sotnikova	(United States) Krista Hardebeck (United States) Lauren Davis	(United States) Allie Kiick (United States) Chiara Scholl (Canada) Marie-Ève Pelletier (Canada) Heidi El Tabakh
April 30	Kangaroo Cup; Gifu, Japan; Hard $50,000; Singles – Doubles	(Japan) Kimiko Date-Krumm; 6–1, 5–7, 6–3	(Thailand) Noppawan Lertcheewakarn	(Japan) Kurumi Nara (Japan) Erika Sema	(Japan) Risa Ozaki (China) Zheng Saisai (Thailand) Luksika Kumkhum (China) Sun Shengnan
April 30	Kangaroo Cup; Gifu, Japan; Hard $50,000; Singles – Doubles	(United States) Jessica Pegula (China) Zheng Saisai; 6–4, 3–6, [10–4]	(Chinese Taipei) Chan Chin-wei (Chinese Taipei) Hsu Wen-hsin	(Japan) Kurumi Nara (Japan) Erika Sema	(Japan) Risa Ozaki (China) Zheng Saisai (Thailand) Luksika Kumkhum (China) Sun Shengnan
April 30	Chiasso, Switzerland; Clay $25,000; Singles and doubles draws	(Switzerland) Amra Sadiković; 6–3, 6–3	(Croatia) Tereza Mrdeža	(Germany) Tatjana Malek (Germany) Kathrin Wörle	(United Kingdom) Laura Robson (Russia) Daria Gavrilova (Germany) Dinah Pfizenmaier (Liechtenstein) Stephanie Vogt
April 30	Chiasso, Switzerland; Clay $25,000; Singles and doubles draws	(Russia) Daria Gavrilova (Russia) Irina Khromacheva; 6–0, 7–6^{(7–1)}	(Switzerland) Conny Perrin (Slovenia) Maša Zec Peškirič	(Germany) Tatjana Malek (Germany) Kathrin Wörle	(United Kingdom) Laura Robson (Russia) Daria Gavrilova (Germany) Dinah Pfizenmaier (Liechtenstein) Stephanie Vogt
April 30	Shymkent, Kazakhstan; Hard $10,000; Singles and doubles draws	(Russia) Sabina Kurbanova; 6–2, 6–3	(Kyrgyzstan) Ksenia Palkina	(Ukraine) Anastasiya Vasylyeva (Russia) Maya Gaverova	(Russia) Evgeniya Svintsova (Uzbekistan) Alina Abdurakhimova (Uzbekistan) Vlada Ekshibarova (Uzbekistan) Sabina Sharipova
April 30	Shymkent, Kazakhstan; Hard $10,000; Singles and doubles draws	(Uzbekistan) Albina Khabibulina (Ukraine) Anastasiya Vasylyeva; 3–6, 6–1, [10–6]	(Russia) Maya Gaverova (Kyrgyzstan) Ksenia Palkina	(Ukraine) Anastasiya Vasylyeva (Russia) Maya Gaverova	(Russia) Evgeniya Svintsova (Uzbekistan) Alina Abdurakhimova (Uzbekistan) Vlada Ekshibarova (Uzbekistan) Sabina Sharipova
April 30	Wiesbaden, Germany; Clay $10,000; Singles and doubles draws	(Kazakhstan) Anna Danilina; 7–6^{(7–2)}, 7–6^{(7–4)}	(Germany) Laura Siegemund	(Czech Republic) Renata Voráčová (Germany) Julia Kimmelmann	(Czech Republic) Jesika Malečková (France) Anaïs Laurendon (France) Constance Sibille (Croatia) Iva Mekovec
April 30	Wiesbaden, Germany; Clay $10,000; Singles and doubles draws	(Germany) Laura Siegemund (United States) Caitlin Whoriskey; 6–0, 6–0	(Russia) Alexandra Romanova (Poland) Sylwia Zagórska	(Czech Republic) Renata Voráčová (Germany) Julia Kimmelmann	(Czech Republic) Jesika Malečková (France) Anaïs Laurendon (France) Constance Sibille (Croatia) Iva Mekovec
April 30	Antalya-İhtisas, Turkey; Hard $10,000; Singles and doubles draws	(United States) Nicole Melichar; 5–7, 6–4, 6–1	(Russia) Angelina Gabueva	(Japan) Kanami Tsuji (Japan) Yuka Mori	(Turkey) Başak Eraydın (Russia) Natalia Orlova (Germany) Christina Shakovets (Israel) Ofri Lankri
April 30	Antalya-İhtisas, Turkey; Hard $10,000; Singles and doubles draws	(Japan) Yuka Mori (Japan) Kaori Onishi; 6–2, 6–4	(Russia) Angelina Gabueva (United States) Nicole Melichar	(Japan) Kanami Tsuji (Japan) Yuka Mori	(Turkey) Başak Eraydın (Russia) Natalia Orlova (Germany) Christina Shakovets (Israel) Ofri Lankri
April 30	Edinburgh, United Kingdom; Clay $10,000; Singles and doubles draws	(Netherlands) Quirine Lemoine; 6–1, 6–0	(France) Elixane Lechemia	(France) Chloé Paquet (Australia) Karolina Wlodarczak	(United Kingdom) Sabrina Bamburac (Netherlands) Eva Wacanno (United Kingdom) Lucy Brown (Germany) Kim Grajdek
April 30	Edinburgh, United Kingdom; Clay $10,000; Singles and doubles draws	(Netherlands) Eva Wacanno (Australia) Karolina Wlodarczak; 4–6, 6–0, [13–11]	(France) Elixane Lechemia (Czech Republic) Martina Přádová	(France) Chloé Paquet (Australia) Karolina Wlodarczak	(United Kingdom) Sabrina Bamburac (Netherlands) Eva Wacanno (United Kingdom) Lucy Brown (Germany) Kim Grajdek
April 30	Jakarta, Indonesia; Hard $10,000; Singles and doubles draws	(China) Wang Yafan; 6–1, 6–3	(China) Yang Zi	(China) Zhu Lin (South Korea) Lee So-ra	(Indonesia) Ayu Fani Damayanti (China) Lu Jiajing (Japan) Kanae Hisami (China) Wen Xin
April 30	Jakarta, Indonesia; Hard $10,000; Singles and doubles draws	(China) Lu Jiajing (China) Lu Jiaxiang; 6–4, 6–4	(United Kingdom) Anna Fitzpatrick (United Kingdom) Jade Windley	(China) Zhu Lin (South Korea) Lee So-ra	(Indonesia) Ayu Fani Damayanti (China) Lu Jiajing (Japan) Kanae Hisami (China) Wen Xin
April 30	São José dos Campos, Brazil; Clay $10,000; Singles and doubles draws	(Venezuela) Gabriela Paz; 6–4, 6–4	(France) Alizé Lim	(Venezuela) Andrea Gámiz (Brazil) Vivian Segnini	(Brazil) Raquel Piltcher (Brazil) Gabriela Cé (Chile) Fernanda Brito (Bolivia) María Fernanda Álvarez Terán
April 30	São José dos Campos, Brazil; Clay $10,000; Singles and doubles draws	(Bolivia) María Fernanda Álvarez Terán (Venezuela) Gabriela Paz; 6–0, 6–3	(Brazil) Carla Forte (Brazil) Laura Pigossi	(Venezuela) Andrea Gámiz (Brazil) Vivian Segnini	(Brazil) Raquel Piltcher (Brazil) Gabriela Cé (Chile) Fernanda Brito (Bolivia) María Fernanda Álvarez Terán
April 30	Trujillo, Peru; Clay $10,000; Singles and doubles draws	(Ukraine) Anastasia Kharchenko; 4–6, 6–2, 6–3	(Peru) Patricia Kú Flores	(Mexico) Ana Sofía Sánchez (United States) Nadia Echeverria Alam	(Germany) Karolina Nowak (United States) Elizabeth Ferris (Peru) Ingrid Várgas Calvo (Argentina) Carolina Zeballos
April 30	Trujillo, Peru; Clay $10,000; Singles and doubles draws	(United States) Nadia Echeverria Alam (United States) Elizabeth Ferris; 7–5, 6–1	(Brazil) Liz Tatiane Koehler Bogarin (United States) Kyra Wojcik	(Mexico) Ana Sofía Sánchez (United States) Nadia Echeverria Alam	(Germany) Karolina Nowak (United States) Elizabeth Ferris (Peru) Ingrid Várgas Calvo (Argentina) Carolina Zeballos
April 30	Moscow, Russia; Hard $25,000; Singles and doubles draws	(Russia) Margarita Gasparyan; 6–3, 4–6, 6–1	(Turkey) Çağla Büyükakçay	(Russia) Veronika Kudermetova (Poland) Paula Kania	(Belarus) Polina Pekhova (Russia) Alexandra Artamonova (Belarus) Lidziya Marozava (Germany) Carina Witthöft
April 30	Moscow, Russia; Hard $25,000; Singles and doubles draws	(Poland) Paula Kania (Belarus) Polina Pekhova; 6–4, 3–6, [10–7]	(Russia) Tatiana Kotelnikova (Belarus) Lidziya Marozava	(Russia) Veronika Kudermetova (Poland) Paula Kania	(Belarus) Polina Pekhova (Russia) Alexandra Artamonova (Belarus) Lidziya Marozava (Germany) Carina Witthöft

=== May ===
Week of	Tournament	Winner	Runners-up	Semifinalists	Quarterfinalists
May 7	Fukuoka International Women's Cup; Fukuoka, Japan; Grass (Carpet) $50,000; Singles – Doubles	(Australia) Casey Dellacqua; 6–4, 6–1	(Australia) Monique Adamczak	(United Kingdom) Melanie South (China) Zheng Saisai	(Japan) Junri Namigata (Russia) Ksenia Lykina (Japan) Erika Takao (Austria) Nikola Hofmanova
May 7	Fukuoka International Women's Cup; Fukuoka, Japan; Grass (Carpet) $50,000; Singles – Doubles	(Australia) Monique Adamczak (Australia) Stephanie Bengson; 6–4, 6–4	(Japan) Misa Eguchi (Japan) Akiko Omae	(United Kingdom) Melanie South (China) Zheng Saisai	(Japan) Junri Namigata (Russia) Ksenia Lykina (Japan) Erika Takao (Austria) Nikola Hofmanova
May 7	RBC Bank Women's Challenger; Raleigh, United States; Clay $25,000; Singles and doubles draws	(United States) Grace Min; 3–6, 6–2, 6–3	(Belgium) Tamaryn Hendler	(Canada) Heidi El Tabakh (Canada) Marie-Ève Pelletier	(Australia) Olivia Rogowska (United States) Beatrice Capra (Australia) Sally Peers (United States) Alexis King
May 7	RBC Bank Women's Challenger; Raleigh, United States; Clay $25,000; Singles and doubles draws	(Canada) Gabriela Dabrowski (Canada) Marie-Ève Pelletier; 6–4, 4–6, [10–5]	(United States) Alexandra Mueller (United States) Asia Muhammad	(Canada) Heidi El Tabakh (Canada) Marie-Ève Pelletier	(Australia) Olivia Rogowska (United States) Beatrice Capra (Australia) Sally Peers (United States) Alexis King
May 7	Tarakan, Indonesia; Hard $25,000; Singles and doubles draws	(China) Lu Jiajing; 6–2, 0–6, 6–2	(Thailand) Nudnida Luangnam	(South Korea) Han Sung-hee (China) Tang Haochen	(Japan) Mai Minokoshi (Austria) Melanie Klaffner (Croatia) Donna Vekić (China) Wen Xin
May 7	Tarakan, Indonesia; Hard $25,000; Singles and doubles draws	(Japan) Chiaki Okadaue (Japan) Yurika Sema; 6–4, 7–6^{(7–4)}	(Vietnam) Huỳnh Phương Đài Trang (South Korea) Lee So-ra	(South Korea) Han Sung-hee (China) Tang Haochen	(Japan) Mai Minokoshi (Austria) Melanie Klaffner (Croatia) Donna Vekić (China) Wen Xin
May 7	Almaty, Kazakhstan; Hard $10,000; Singles and doubles draws	(Russia) Ksenia Kirillova; 6–2, 7–5	(Russia) Karina Isayan	(Ukraine) Anastasiya Vasylyeva (Russia) Ekaterina Yashina	(Russia) Margarita Lazareva (Uzbekistan) Vlada Ekshibarova (Uzbekistan) Sabina Sharipova (Russia) Maya Gaverova
May 7	Almaty, Kazakhstan; Hard $10,000; Singles and doubles draws	(Uzbekistan) Sabina Sharipova (Russia) Ekaterina Yashina; 6–4, 3–6, [10–3]	(Uzbekistan) Albina Khabibulina (Ukraine) Anastasiya Vasylyeva	(Ukraine) Anastasiya Vasylyeva (Russia) Ekaterina Yashina	(Russia) Margarita Lazareva (Uzbekistan) Vlada Ekshibarova (Uzbekistan) Sabina Sharipova (Russia) Maya Gaverova
May 7	Open GDF SUEZ de Cagnes-sur-Mer Alpes-Maritimes; Cagnes-sur-Mer, France; Clay $100,000+H; Singles – Doubles	(Russia) Yulia Putintseva; 6–2, 6–1	(Austria) Patricia Mayr-Achleitner	(Slovakia) Magdaléna Rybáriková (France) Caroline Garcia	(Germany) Kristina Barrois (Romania) Alexandra Cadanțu (Canada) Stéphanie Dubois (Hungary) Melinda Czink
May 7	Open GDF SUEZ de Cagnes-sur-Mer Alpes-Maritimes; Cagnes-sur-Mer, France; Clay $100,000+H; Singles – Doubles	(Russia) Alexandra Panova (Poland) Urszula Radwańska; 7–5, 4–6, [10–6]	(Hungary) Katalin Marosi (Czech Republic) Renata Voráčová	(Slovakia) Magdaléna Rybáriková (France) Caroline Garcia	(Germany) Kristina Barrois (Romania) Alexandra Cadanțu (Canada) Stéphanie Dubois (Hungary) Melinda Czink
May 7	Båstad, Sweden; Clay $10,000; Singles and doubles draws	(Canada) Eugenie Bouchard; 7–6^{(7–4)}, 6–0	(Germany) Katharina Lehnert	(Sweden) Hilda Melander (United States) Sachia Vickery	(Poland) Barbara Sobaszkiewicz (Denmark) Karen Barbat (Czech Republic) Kateřina Kramperová (Sweden) Beatrice Cedermark
May 7	Båstad, Sweden; Clay $10,000; Singles and doubles draws	(Sweden) Sandra Roma (Sweden) Eveliina Virtanen; 6–2, 3–6, [10–7]	(Sweden) Hilda Melander (Sweden) Paulina Milosavljevic	(Sweden) Hilda Melander (United States) Sachia Vickery	(Poland) Barbara Sobaszkiewicz (Denmark) Karen Barbat (Czech Republic) Kateřina Kramperová (Sweden) Beatrice Cedermark
May 7	Florence, Italy; Clay $10,000; Singles and doubles draws	(France) Anaïs Laurendon; 6–4, 6–4	(Poland) Magda Linette	(Italy) Gioia Barbieri (Colombia) Yuliana Lizarazo	(Italy) Agnese Zucchini (Italy) Andreea Văideanu (Germany) Justine Ozga (Belgium) Alison Van Uytvanck
May 7	Florence, Italy; Clay $10,000; Singles and doubles draws	(Italy) Gioia Barbieri (Italy) Andreea Văideanu; 6–2, 6–7^{(2–7)}, [10–8]	(Italy) Nicole Clerico (France) Anaïs Laurendon	(Italy) Gioia Barbieri (Colombia) Yuliana Lizarazo	(Italy) Agnese Zucchini (Italy) Andreea Văideanu (Germany) Justine Ozga (Belgium) Alison Van Uytvanck
May 7	Istanbul, Turkey; Hard $10,000; Singles and doubles draws	(Turkey) Başak Eraydın; 6–3, 6–1	(Spain) Nuria Párrizas Díaz	(Greece) Maria Sakkari (China) Liu Chang	(Turkey) Melis Sezer (Germany) Anna Zaja (Germany) Christina Shakovets (United Kingdom) Amanda Carreras
May 7	Istanbul, Turkey; Hard $10,000; Singles and doubles draws	(Turkey) Başak Eraydın (Turkey) Melis Sezer; 6–2, 3–6, [10–7]	(Oman) Fatma Al Nabhani (Germany) Anna Zaja	(Greece) Maria Sakkari (China) Liu Chang	(Turkey) Melis Sezer (Germany) Anna Zaja (Germany) Christina Shakovets (United Kingdom) Amanda Carreras
May 7	Bad Saarow, Germany; Clay $10,000; Singles and doubles draws	(Slovakia) Anna Karolína Schmiedlová; 6–1, 6–3	(Czech Republic) Kateřina Vaňková	(France) Constance Sibille (France) Elixane Lechemia	(Germany) Dejana Raickovic (Czech Republic) Martina Borecká (Serbia) Natalija Kostić (France) Laëtitia Sarrazin
May 7	Bad Saarow, Germany; Clay $10,000; Singles and doubles draws	(Czech Republic) Martina Borecká (Czech Republic) Simona Dobrá; 6–2, 6–2	(Germany) Carolin Daniels (Germany) Dejana Raickovic	(France) Constance Sibille (France) Elixane Lechemia	(Germany) Dejana Raickovic (Czech Republic) Martina Borecká (Serbia) Natalija Kostić (France) Laëtitia Sarrazin
May 7	New Delhi, India; Hard $10,000; Singles and doubles draws	(Chinese Taipei) Lee Pei-chi; 6–4, 6–2	(India) Natasha Palha	(India) Poojashree Venkatesha (India) Sharmada Balu	(India) Sri Peddi Reddy (India) Ratnika Batra (India) Eetee Maheta (Japan) Ai Koga
May 7	New Delhi, India; Hard $10,000; Singles and doubles draws	(India) Rushmi Chakravarthi (India) Ankita Raina; 6–1, 6–4	(China) Liu Yu Xuan (China) Zhao Qianqian	(India) Poojashree Venkatesha (India) Sharmada Balu	(India) Sri Peddi Reddy (India) Ratnika Batra (India) Eetee Maheta (Japan) Ai Koga
May 7	Rosario, Argentina; Clay $25,000; Singles and doubles draws	(Brazil) Teliana Pereira; 7–5, 7–6^{(7–5)}	(Argentina) Mailen Auroux	(Austria) Nicole Rottmann (Paraguay) Verónica Cepede Royg	(Argentina) Florencia Molinero (Argentina) Victoria Bosio (Argentina) Nadia Podoroska (Argentina) Sofía Luini
May 7	Rosario, Argentina; Clay $25,000; Singles and doubles draws	(Brazil) Teliana Pereira (Austria) Nicole Rottmann; 6–2, 7–5	(Paraguay) Verónica Cepede Royg (Argentina) Luciana Sarmenti	(Austria) Nicole Rottmann (Paraguay) Verónica Cepede Royg	(Argentina) Florencia Molinero (Argentina) Victoria Bosio (Argentina) Nadia Podoroska (Argentina) Sofía Luini
May 7	Brasília, Brazil; Clay $25,000; Singles and doubles draws	(Venezuela) Gabriela Paz; 6–3, 6–3	(Chile) Andrea Koch Benvenuto	(Bolivia) María Fernanda Álvarez Terán (Brazil) Vivian Segnini	(Brazil) Gabriela Cé (Brazil) Carla Forte (Bulgaria) Aleksandrina Naydenova (Brazil) Laura Pigossi
May 7	Brasília, Brazil; Clay $25,000; Singles and doubles draws	(Bolivia) María Fernanda Álvarez Terán (Venezuela) Gabriela Paz; 6–2, 6–4	(France) Alizé Lim (Bulgaria) Aleksandrina Naydenova	(Bolivia) María Fernanda Álvarez Terán (Brazil) Vivian Segnini	(Brazil) Gabriela Cé (Brazil) Carla Forte (Bulgaria) Aleksandrina Naydenova (Brazil) Laura Pigossi
May 14	Kurume Best Amenity International Women's Tennis; Kurume, Japan; Grass $50,000; Singles – Doubles	(China) Zheng Saisai; 7–5, 6–2	(Australia) Monique Adamczak	(Croatia) Maria Abramović (Japan) Junri Namigata	(Kazakhstan) Zarina Diyas (Japan) Aiko Nakamura (China) Wang Qiang (Austria) Nikola Hofmanova
May 14	Kurume Best Amenity International Women's Tennis; Kurume, Japan; Grass $50,000; Singles – Doubles	(China) Han Xinyun (China) Sun Shengnan; 6–1, 6–0	(Russia) Ksenia Lykina (United Kingdom) Melanie South	(Croatia) Maria Abramović (Japan) Junri Namigata	(Kazakhstan) Zarina Diyas (Japan) Aiko Nakamura (China) Wang Qiang (Austria) Nikola Hofmanova
May 14	Fergana, Uzbekistan; Hard $25,000; Singles and doubles draws	(Croatia) Donna Vekić; 6–2, 6–2	(Ukraine) Nadiia Kichenok	(Turkey) Çağla Büyükakçay (Japan) Chiaki Okadaue	(Slovenia) Dalila Jakupović (Uzbekistan) Sabina Sharipova (Ukraine) Lyudmyla Kichenok (Ukraine) Irina Buryachok
May 14	Fergana, Uzbekistan; Hard $25,000; Singles and doubles draws	(Ukraine) Lyudmyla Kichenok (Ukraine) Nadiia Kichenok; 6–4, 6–1	(Uzbekistan) Albina Khabibulina (Ukraine) Anastasiya Vasylyeva	(Turkey) Çağla Büyükakçay (Japan) Chiaki Okadaue	(Slovenia) Dalila Jakupović (Uzbekistan) Sabina Sharipova (Ukraine) Lyudmyla Kichenok (Ukraine) Irina Buryachok
May 14	Casablanca, Morocco; Clay $25,000; Singles and doubles draws	(Spain) Arantxa Parra Santonja; 6–4, 6–4	(Ukraine) Olga Savchuk	(Tunisia) Ons Jabeur (Spain) María Teresa Torró Flor	(Croatia) Ajla Tomljanović (Czech Republic) Renata Voráčová (Spain) Beatriz García Vidagany (Croatia) Tereza Mrdeža
May 14	Casablanca, Morocco; Clay $25,000; Singles and doubles draws	(Ukraine) Olga Savchuk (Czech Republic) Renata Voráčová; 6–1, 6–4	(Romania) Elena Bogdan (Romania) Raluca Olaru	(Tunisia) Ons Jabeur (Spain) María Teresa Torró Flor	(Croatia) Ajla Tomljanović (Czech Republic) Renata Voráčová (Spain) Beatriz García Vidagany (Croatia) Tereza Mrdeža
May 14	Landisville, United States; Hard $10,000; Singles and doubles draws	(Finland) Piia Suomalainen; 7–6^{(7–4)}, 6–1	(United States) Elizabeth Lumpkin	(United States) Anne-Liz Jeukeng (Russia) Yana Koroleva	(United States) Alexandra Mueller (Russia) Nika Kukharchuk (China) Zhao Di (United States) Denise Starr
May 14	Landisville, United States; Hard $10,000; Singles and doubles draws	(United States) Macall Harkins (United States) Chieh-Yu Hsu; 6–3, 6–4	(Canada) Gabriela Dabrowski (United States) Alexandra Mueller	(United States) Anne-Liz Jeukeng (Russia) Yana Koroleva	(United States) Alexandra Mueller (Russia) Nika Kukharchuk (China) Zhao Di (United States) Denise Starr
May 14	Open Saint-Gaudens Midi Pyrénées; Saint-Gaudens, France; Clay $50,000+H; Singles – Doubles	(Colombia) Mariana Duque; 4–6, 6–3, 6–2	(France) Claire Feuerstein	(Russia) Valeria Savinykh (France) Aravane Rezaï	(Spain) Inés Ferrer Suárez (United States) Julia Cohen (Russia) Irina Khromacheva (Netherlands) Bibiane Schoofs
May 14	Open Saint-Gaudens Midi Pyrénées; Saint-Gaudens, France; Clay $50,000+H; Singles – Doubles	(Serbia) Vesna Dolonc (Russia) Irina Khromacheva; 6–2, 6–0	(United Kingdom) Naomi Broady (Israel) Julia Glushko	(Russia) Valeria Savinykh (France) Aravane Rezaï	(Spain) Inés Ferrer Suárez (United States) Julia Cohen (Russia) Irina Khromacheva (Netherlands) Bibiane Schoofs
May 14	Sparta Prague Open; Prague, Czech Republic; Clay $100,000; Singles – Doubles	(Czech Republic) Lucie Šafářová; 6–3, 7–5	(Czech Republic) Klára Zakopalová	(France) Alizé Cornet (United Kingdom) Elena Baltacha	(Japan) Ayumi Morita (Czech Republic) Eva Birnerová (Latvia) Anastasija Sevastova (Japan) Kimiko Date-Krumm
May 14	Sparta Prague Open; Prague, Czech Republic; Clay $100,000; Singles – Doubles	(France) Alizé Cornet (France) Virginie Razzano; 6–2, 6–3	(Uzbekistan) Akgul Amanmuradova (Australia) Casey Dellacqua	(France) Alizé Cornet (United Kingdom) Elena Baltacha	(Japan) Ayumi Morita (Czech Republic) Eva Birnerová (Latvia) Anastasija Sevastova (Japan) Kimiko Date-Krumm
May 14	Caserta, Italy; Clay $25,000; Singles and doubles draws	(Peru) Bianca Botto; 6–1, 6–0	(Serbia) Aleksandra Krunić	(Canada) Sharon Fichman (France) Irena Pavlovic	(Italy) Carolina Pillot (Italy) Angelica Moratelli (Latvia) Diāna Marcinkēviča (Italy) Gioia Barbieri
May 14	Caserta, Italy; Clay $25,000; Singles and doubles draws	(Poland) Katarzyna Piter (Slovakia) Romana Tabak; 6–2, 6–3	(Switzerland) Viktorija Golubic (Serbia) Aleksandra Krunić	(Canada) Sharon Fichman (France) Irena Pavlovic	(Italy) Carolina Pillot (Italy) Angelica Moratelli (Latvia) Diāna Marcinkēviča (Italy) Gioia Barbieri
May 14	Istanbul, Turkey; Clay $10,000; Singles and doubles draws	(Netherlands) Quirine Lemoine; 6–2, 7–6^{(7–5)}	(Armenia) Ani Amiraghyan	(Germany) Jasmin Steinherr (United Kingdom) Amanda Carreras	(United States) Christina Makarova (Germany) Bianca Koch (China) Liu Chang (Spain) Nuria Párrizas Díaz
May 14	Istanbul, Turkey; Clay $10,000; Singles and doubles draws	(Turkey) Başak Eraydın (Turkey) İpek Soylu; 3–6, 6–2, [10–5]	(China) Liu Chang (China) Zhang Nannan	(Germany) Jasmin Steinherr (United Kingdom) Amanda Carreras	(United States) Christina Makarova (Germany) Bianca Koch (China) Liu Chang (Spain) Nuria Párrizas Díaz
May 14	Båstad, Sweden; Clay $10,000; Singles and doubles draws	(Canada) Eugenie Bouchard; 6–3, 6–0	(Serbia) Milana Špremo	(Sweden) Sandra Roma (Australia) Sally Peers	(Sweden) Beatrice Cedermark (Poland) Barbara Sobaszkiewicz (Switzerland) Lara Michel (Sweden) Valeria Osadchenko
May 14	Båstad, Sweden; Clay $10,000; Singles and doubles draws	(Sweden) Sandra Roma (Sweden) Eveliina Virtanen; 6–3, 6–7^{(4–7)}, [10–6]	(United Kingdom) Lucy Brown (Serbia) Milana Špremo	(Sweden) Sandra Roma (Australia) Sally Peers	(Sweden) Beatrice Cedermark (Poland) Barbara Sobaszkiewicz (Switzerland) Lara Michel (Sweden) Valeria Osadchenko
May 14	Moscow, Russia; Clay $25,000; Singles and doubles draws	(Russia) Margarita Gasparyan; 4–6, 6–4, 7–6^{(7–2)}	(Russia) Daria Gavrilova	(Ukraine) Olga Ianchuk (Ukraine) Valentyna Ivakhnenko	(Russia) Marina Melnikova (Turkey) Pemra Özgen (Ukraine) Kateryna Kozlova (Russia) Olga Puchkova
May 14	Moscow, Russia; Clay $25,000; Singles and doubles draws	(Ukraine) Valentyna Ivakhnenko (Ukraine) Kateryna Kozlova; 6–1, 6–3	(Belarus) Darya Lebesheva (Russia) Julia Valetova	(Ukraine) Olga Ianchuk (Ukraine) Valentyna Ivakhnenko	(Russia) Marina Melnikova (Turkey) Pemra Özgen (Ukraine) Kateryna Kozlova (Russia) Olga Puchkova
May 14	Rosario, Argentina; Clay $10,000; Singles and doubles draws	(Mexico) Ana Sofía Sánchez; 6–1, 6–3	(Argentina) Guadalupe Moreno	(Argentina) Tatiana Búa (Peru) Patricia Kú Flores	(Argentina) Vanesa Furlanetto (Argentina) Nadia Podoroska (Argentina) Tatiana Carpio (Argentina) Francesca Rescaldani
May 14	Rosario, Argentina; Clay $10,000; Singles and doubles draws	(Argentina) Tatiana Búa (Chile) Camila Silva; 6–4, 7–6^{(7–2)}	(Argentina) Luciana Sarmenti (Chile) Daniela Seguel	(Argentina) Tatiana Búa (Peru) Patricia Kú Flores	(Argentina) Vanesa Furlanetto (Argentina) Nadia Podoroska (Argentina) Tatiana Carpio (Argentina) Francesca Rescaldani
May 21	Astana, Kazakhstan; Hard $25,000; Singles and doubles draws	(Ukraine) Lyudmyla Kichenok; 4–6, 6–4, 6–2	(United Kingdom) Lisa Whybourn	(Russia) Ksenia Kirillova (Ukraine) Irina Buryachok	(Serbia) Tamara Čurović (Slovenia) Tadeja Majerič (Ukraine) Valentyna Ivakhnenko (Slovenia) Dalila Jakupović
May 21	Astana, Kazakhstan; Hard $25,000; Singles and doubles draws	(Ukraine) Valentyna Ivakhnenko (Ukraine) Kateryna Kozlova; 6–2, 6–0	(Russia) Diana Isaeva (Russia) Ksenia Kirillova	(Russia) Ksenia Kirillova (Ukraine) Irina Buryachok	(Serbia) Tamara Čurović (Slovenia) Tadeja Majerič (Ukraine) Valentyna Ivakhnenko (Slovenia) Dalila Jakupović
May 21	Changwon, South Korea; Hard $25,000; Singles and doubles draws	(China) Duan Yingying; 6–4, 6–3	(Hong Kong) Zhang Ling	(South Korea) Yoo Mi (China) Zhou Yimiao	(South Korea) Han Sung-hee (Thailand) Nudnida Luangnam (China) Zhao Yijing (China) Han Xinyun
May 21	Changwon, South Korea; Hard $25,000; Singles and doubles draws	(China) Liu Wanting (China) Xu Yifan; 6–4, 7–5	(China) Yang Zhaoxuan (China) Zhang Kailin	(South Korea) Yoo Mi (China) Zhou Yimiao	(South Korea) Han Sung-hee (Thailand) Nudnida Luangnam (China) Zhao Yijing (China) Han Xinyun
May 21	Sumter, United States; Hard $10,000; Singles and doubles draws	(United States) Louisa Chirico; 6–4, 6–3	(United States) Victoria Duval	(Finland) Piia Suomalainen (China) Zhao Di	(Japan) Mayo Hibi (Chile) Cecilia Costa Melgar (Indonesia) Romana Tedjakusuma (Australia) Jessica Moore
May 21	Sumter, United States; Hard $10,000; Singles and doubles draws	(United States) Jan Abaza (United Kingdom) Nicola Slater; 7–6^{(7–1)}, 6–3	(United States) Elizabeth Ferris (Japan) Mayo Hibi	(Finland) Piia Suomalainen (China) Zhao Di	(Japan) Mayo Hibi (Chile) Cecilia Costa Melgar (Indonesia) Romana Tedjakusuma (Australia) Jessica Moore
May 21	Brescia, Italy; Clay $25,000; Singles and doubles draws	(Slovakia) Anna Karolína Schmiedlová; 6–3, 6–2	(Spain) Beatriz García Vidagany	(Croatia) Tereza Mrdeža (Portugal) Maria João Koehler	(Italy) Anastasia Grymalska (Liechtenstein) Stephanie Vogt (Netherlands) Richèl Hogenkamp (Italy) Corinna Dentoni
May 21	Brescia, Italy; Clay $25,000; Singles and doubles draws	(Italy) Corinna Dentoni (Latvia) Diāna Marcinkēviča; 6–2, 6–1	(Croatia) Tereza Mrdeža (Slovenia) Maša Zec Peškirič	(Croatia) Tereza Mrdeža (Portugal) Maria João Koehler	(Italy) Anastasia Grymalska (Liechtenstein) Stephanie Vogt (Netherlands) Richèl Hogenkamp (Italy) Corinna Dentoni
May 21	Timișoara, Romania; Clay $10,000; Singles and doubles draws	(Romania) Andreea Mitu; 6–2, 6–0	(Slovakia) Viktória Maľová	(Czech Republic) Dana Machálková (Romania) Simona Ionescu	(Romania) Irina Maria Bara (France) Léa Tholey (Bulgaria) Dalia Zafirova (Serbia) Teodora Mirčić
May 21	Timișoara, Romania; Clay $10,000; Singles and doubles draws	(Serbia) Teodora Mirčić (Romania) Andreea Mitu; 6–1, 6–2	(North Macedonia) Lina Gjorcheska (Bulgaria) Dalia Zafirova	(Czech Republic) Dana Machálková (Romania) Simona Ionescu	(Romania) Irina Maria Bara (France) Léa Tholey (Bulgaria) Dalia Zafirova (Serbia) Teodora Mirčić
May 21	Getxo, Spain; Clay $10,000; Singles and doubles draws	(United Kingdom) Amanda Carreras; 6–3, 4–6, 6–4	(Spain) Yvonne Cavallé Reimers	(France) Jade Suvrijn (Spain) Rocío de la Torre Sánchez	(Poland) Patrycja Sanduska (France) Chloé Paquet (Spain) Olga Sáez Larra (Portugal) Margarida Moura
May 21	Getxo, Spain; Clay $10,000; Singles and doubles draws	(Italy) Benedetta Davato (Italy) Federica Quercia; 7–6^{(7–3)}, 6–2	(Spain) Rocío de la Torre Sánchez (Spain) Arabela Fernández Rabener	(France) Jade Suvrijn (Spain) Rocío de la Torre Sánchez	(Poland) Patrycja Sanduska (France) Chloé Paquet (Spain) Olga Sáez Larra (Portugal) Margarida Moura
May 21	Karuizawa, Japan; Grass $25,000; Singles and doubles draws	(Russia) Marta Sirotkina; 6–4, 2–6, 6–4	(Japan) Junri Namigata	(China) Wang Qiang (Japan) Aki Yamasoto	(Japan) Kumiko Iijima (Japan) Chinami Ogi (Russia) Ksenia Lykina (United Kingdom) Melanie South
May 21	Karuizawa, Japan; Grass $25,000; Singles and doubles draws	(Chinese Taipei) Hsieh Shu-ying (Japan) Kumiko Iijima; 3–6, 7–6^{(8–6)}, [10–1]	(United Kingdom) Samantha Murray (United Kingdom) Emily Webley-Smith	(China) Wang Qiang (Japan) Aki Yamasoto	(Japan) Kumiko Iijima (Japan) Chinami Ogi (Russia) Ksenia Lykina (United Kingdom) Melanie South
May 21	New Delhi, India; Hard $10,000; Singles and doubles draws	(India) Rishika Sunkara; 6–2, 6–4	(India) Simran Kaur Sethi	(Hong Kong) Wu Ho Ching (India) Natasha Palha	(India) Eetee Maheta (India) Shweta Rana (India) Prarthana Thombare (India) Prerna Bhambri
May 21	New Delhi, India; Hard $10,000; Singles and doubles draws	(India) Rushmi Chakravarthi (India) Ankita Raina; 6–3, 6–2	(India) Sri Peddi Reddy (India) Prarthana Thombare	(Hong Kong) Wu Ho Ching (India) Natasha Palha	(India) Eetee Maheta (India) Shweta Rana (India) Prarthana Thombare (India) Prerna Bhambri
May 21	İzmir, Turkey; Hard $10,000; Singles and doubles draws	(Turkey) Başak Eraydın; 6–0, 6–1	(Sweden) Beatrice Cedermark	(Denmark) Maria Jespersen (Japan) Eri Hozumi	(Poland) Natalia Siedliska (Mexico) Nadia Abdalá (Poland) Sylwia Zagórska (Turkey) Sultan Gönen
May 21	İzmir, Turkey; Hard $10,000; Singles and doubles draws	(Poland) Natalia Siedliska (Poland) Sylwia Zagórska; 6–4, 6–3	(Mexico) Nadia Abdalá (Russia) Yana Sizikova	(Denmark) Maria Jespersen (Japan) Eri Hozumi	(Poland) Natalia Siedliska (Mexico) Nadia Abdalá (Poland) Sylwia Zagórska (Turkey) Sultan Gönen
May 21	Ra'anana, Israel; Hard $10,000; Singles and doubles draws	(Israel) Ofri Lankri; 6–0, 6–1	(Greece) Despoina Vogasari	(Israel) Amit Lev Ari (Israel) Valeria Patiuk	(Russia) Angelina Gabueva (Israel) Ekaterina Tour (Ukraine) Oleksandra Piskun (Israel) Saray Sterenbach
May 21	Ra'anana, Israel; Hard $10,000; Singles and doubles draws	(Israel) Ester Masuri (Israel) Ekaterina Tour; 7–5, 1–6, [10–5]	(Russia) Angelina Gabueva (Ukraine) Vladyslava Zanosiyenko	(Israel) Amit Lev Ari (Israel) Valeria Patiuk	(Russia) Angelina Gabueva (Israel) Ekaterina Tour (Ukraine) Oleksandra Piskun (Israel) Saray Sterenbach
May 21	Velenje, Slovenia; Clay $10,000; Singles and doubles draws	(Germany) Anna-Lena Friedsam; 6–1, 6–3	(Italy) Agnese Zucchini	(Slovenia) Anja Prislan (Italy) Carolina Pillot	(Hungary) Vanda Lukács (Czech Republic) Kateřina Kramperová (Croatia) Dijana Banoveć (Croatia) Silvia Njirić
May 21	Velenje, Slovenia; Clay $10,000; Singles and doubles draws	(Germany) Anna-Lena Friedsam (Hungary) Vanda Lukács; 7–6^{(7–3)}, 5–7, [10–4]	(Slovenia) Anja Prislan (Germany) Dejana Raickovic	(Slovenia) Anja Prislan (Italy) Carolina Pillot	(Hungary) Vanda Lukács (Czech Republic) Kateřina Kramperová (Croatia) Dijana Banoveć (Croatia) Silvia Njirić
May 28	FSP Gold River Women's Challenger; Sacramento, United States; Hard $50,000; Singles – Doubles	(United States) Maria Sanchez; 4–6, 6–3, 6–1	(United States) Jessica Pegula	(Russia) Valeria Solovyeva (United States) Samantha Crawford	(Russia) Elena Bovina (Indonesia) Romana Tedjakusuma (United States) Asia Muhammad (United States) Ashley Weinhold
May 28	FSP Gold River Women's Challenger; Sacramento, United States; Hard $50,000; Singles – Doubles	(United States) Asia Muhammad (United States) Yasmin Schnack; 6–3, 7–6^{(7–4)}	(United States) Kaitlyn Christian (United States) Maria Sanchez	(Russia) Valeria Solovyeva (United States) Samantha Crawford	(Russia) Elena Bovina (Indonesia) Romana Tedjakusuma (United States) Asia Muhammad (United States) Ashley Weinhold
May 28	Gimcheon, South Korea; Hard $25,000; Singles and doubles draws	(China) Duan Yingying; 6–2, 6–1	(South Africa) Chanel Simmonds	(South Korea) Han Sung-hee (South Korea) Yu Min-hwa	(South Korea) Lee So-ra (Thailand) Nicha Lertpitaksinchai (China) Liang Chen (China) Sun Shengnan
May 28	Gimcheon, South Korea; Hard $25,000; Singles and doubles draws	(China) Hu Yueyue (China) Xu Yifan; 6–0, 3–6, [10–7]	(China) Liang Chen (China) Sun Shengnan	(South Korea) Han Sung-hee (South Korea) Yu Min-hwa	(South Korea) Lee So-ra (Thailand) Nicha Lertpitaksinchai (China) Liang Chen (China) Sun Shengnan
May 28	Hilton Head Island, United States; Hard $10,000; Singles and doubles draws	(Japan) Mayo Hibi; 6–3, 6–1	(Australia) Jessica Moore	(United States) Breaunna Addison (United States) Jan Abaza	(United States) Tornado Alicia Black (Russia) Yana Koroleva (United States) Victoria Duval (United States) Sherry Li
May 28	Hilton Head Island, United States; Hard $10,000; Singles and doubles draws	(United States) Anamika Bhargava (United States) Sylvia Krywacz; 6–1, 6–4	(Slovenia) Jelena Durišič (Japan) Rio Kitagawa	(United States) Breaunna Addison (United States) Jan Abaza	(United States) Tornado Alicia Black (Russia) Yana Koroleva (United States) Victoria Duval (United States) Sherry Li
May 28	Qarshi, Uzbekistan; Hard $10,000; Singles and doubles draws	(Belarus) Ksenia Milevskaya; 6–4, 7–5	(Ukraine) Nadiia Kichenok	(Serbia) Tamara Čurović (Israel) Keren Shlomo	(Ukraine) Anastasiya Vasylyeva (Russia) Ekaterina Yashina (Russia) Angelina Gabueva (Ukraine) Lyudmyla Kichenok
May 28	Qarshi, Uzbekistan; Hard $10,000; Singles and doubles draws	(Belarus) Darya Lebesheva (Russia) Ekaterina Yashina; 7–6^{(7–5)}, 6–2	(Uzbekistan) Albina Khabibulina (Ukraine) Anastasiya Vasylyeva	(Serbia) Tamara Čurović (Israel) Keren Shlomo	(Ukraine) Anastasiya Vasylyeva (Russia) Ekaterina Yashina (Russia) Angelina Gabueva (Ukraine) Lyudmyla Kichenok
May 28	Arad, Romania; Clay $10,000; Singles and doubles draws	(North Macedonia) Lina Gjorcheska; 4–6, 6–4, 6–3	(Slovakia) Viktória Maľová	(Romania) Cristina Adamescu (Hungary) Csilla Borsányi	(Romania) Laura Enea (Romania) Alexandra Damaschin (Romania) Cristina Ene (Moldova) Anastasia Vdovenco
May 28	Arad, Romania; Clay $10,000; Singles and doubles draws	(North Macedonia) Lina Gjorcheska (Slovakia) Viktória Maľová; Walkover	(Romania) Alexandra Damaschin (Romania) Patricia Maria Țig	(Romania) Cristina Adamescu (Hungary) Csilla Borsányi	(Romania) Laura Enea (Romania) Alexandra Damaschin (Romania) Cristina Ene (Moldova) Anastasia Vdovenco
May 28	Grado, Italy; Clay $25,000; Singles and doubles draws	(Italy) Maria Elena Camerin; 6–2, 6–3	(Austria) Yvonne Meusburger	(Georgia (country)) Margalita Chakhnashvili (Romania) Mihaela Buzărnescu	(Russia) Daria Gavrilova (Australia) Sacha Jones (Italy) Nastassja Burnett (Montenegro) Danka Kovinić
May 28	Grado, Italy; Clay $25,000; Singles and doubles draws	(Georgia (country)) Margalita Chakhnashvili (Georgia (country)) Ekaterine Gorgodze; 7–6^{(7–2)}, 7–6^{(7–1)}	(Italy) Claudia Giovine (Italy) Anastasia Grymalska	(Georgia (country)) Margalita Chakhnashvili (Romania) Mihaela Buzărnescu	(Russia) Daria Gavrilova (Australia) Sacha Jones (Italy) Nastassja Burnett (Montenegro) Danka Kovinić
May 28	Cantanhede, Portugal; Carpet $10,000; Singles and doubles draws	(France) Charlène Seateun; 4–6, 6–3, 6–4	(Spain) Olga Sáez Larra	(Germany) Carolin Daniels (Spain) Paula Mocete Talamantes	(France) Amandine Cazeaux (Poland) Olga Brózda (Spain) Carolina Prats Millán (France) Virginie Ayassamy
May 28	Cantanhede, Portugal; Carpet $10,000; Singles and doubles draws	(Portugal) Margarida Moura (Portugal) Joana Valle Costa; 7–5, 6–1	(Spain) Aida Martínez Sanjuán (Spain) Paula Mocete Talamantes	(Germany) Carolin Daniels (Spain) Paula Mocete Talamantes	(France) Amandine Cazeaux (Poland) Olga Brózda (Spain) Carolina Prats Millán (France) Virginie Ayassamy
May 28	Přerov, Czech Republic; Clay $15,000; Singles and doubles draws	(Romania) Andreea Mitu; 6–2, 6–3	(Czech Republic) Martina Kubičíková	(Austria) Tina Schiechtl (Germany) Anne Schäfer	(Czech Republic) Kateřina Kramperová (Brazil) Nathália Rossi (Bulgaria) Isabella Shinikova (Poland) Paula Kania
May 28	Přerov, Czech Republic; Clay $15,000; Singles and doubles draws	(Czech Republic) Nikola Fraňková (Czech Republic) Tereza Hladíková; 4–6, 7–6^{(9–7)}, [10–8]	(Czech Republic) Simona Dobrá (Czech Republic) Lucie Kriegsmannová	(Austria) Tina Schiechtl (Germany) Anne Schäfer	(Czech Republic) Kateřina Kramperová (Brazil) Nathália Rossi (Bulgaria) Isabella Shinikova (Poland) Paula Kania
May 28	Trabzon, Turkey; Hard $10,000; Singles and doubles draws	(Russia) Margarita Lazareva; 6–4, 6–3	(Turkey) Melis Sezer	(Romania) Diana Stomlega (Mexico) Nadia Abdalá	(Russia) Alina Mikheeva (Japan) Eri Hozumi (Bulgaria) Borislava Botusharova (Italy) Stephanie Scimone
May 28	Trabzon, Turkey; Hard $10,000; Singles and doubles draws	(Russia) Margarita Lazareva (Australia) Abbie Myers; 6–2, 6–3	(Turkey) Sultan Gönen (Turkey) Büşra Kayrun	(Romania) Diana Stomlega (Mexico) Nadia Abdalá	(Russia) Alina Mikheeva (Japan) Eri Hozumi (Bulgaria) Borislava Botusharova (Italy) Stephanie Scimone
May 28	Warsaw, Poland; Clay $10,000; Singles and doubles draws	(Slovakia) Chantal Škamlová; 6–3, 6–2	(Poland) Katarzyna Kawa	(Belgium) Elyne Boeykens (Ukraine) Nadiya Kolb	(Slovakia) Vivien Juhászová (Poland) Sylwia Zagórska (Germany) Dejana Raickovic (United States) Caitlin Whoriskey
May 28	Warsaw, Poland; Clay $10,000; Singles and doubles draws	(Belgium) Elyne Boeykens (United States) Caitlin Whoriskey; 6–2, 6–2	(Poland) Karolina Kosińska (Poland) Aleksandra Rosolska	(Belgium) Elyne Boeykens (Ukraine) Nadiya Kolb	(Slovakia) Vivien Juhászová (Poland) Sylwia Zagórska (Germany) Dejana Raickovic (United States) Caitlin Whoriskey
May 28	Maribor, Slovenia; Clay $25,000; Singles and doubles draws	(Germany) Anna-Lena Friedsam; 2–6, 7–6^{(7–1)}, 6–2	(Brazil) Teliana Pereira	(Germany) Kathrin Wörle (Croatia) Ajla Tomljanović	(Canada) Eugenie Bouchard (Slovenia) Maša Zec Peškirič (Slovakia) Jana Čepelová (Portugal) Maria João Koehler
May 28	Maribor, Slovenia; Clay $25,000; Singles and doubles draws	(Romania) Elena Bogdan (Germany) Kathrin Wörle; 6–2, 2–6, [10–5]	(Denmark) Karen Barbat (Germany) Anna-Lena Friedsam	(Germany) Kathrin Wörle (Croatia) Ajla Tomljanović	(Canada) Eugenie Bouchard (Slovenia) Maša Zec Peškirič (Slovakia) Jana Čepelová (Portugal) Maria João Koehler

=== June ===
Week of	Tournament	Winner	Runners-up	Semifinalists	Quarterfinalists
June 4	AEGON Trophy; Nottingham, United Kingdom; Grass $75,000; Singles – Doubles	(Poland) Urszula Radwańska; 6–1, 4–6, 6–1	(United States) Coco Vandeweghe	(United States) Irina Falconi (United Kingdom) Anne Keothavong	(Chinese Taipei) Chang Kai-chen (United Kingdom) Elena Baltacha (Czech Republic) Kristýna Plíšková (Chinese Taipei) Hsieh Su-wei
June 4	AEGON Trophy; Nottingham, United Kingdom; Grass $75,000; Singles – Doubles	(Greece) Eleni Daniilidou (Australia) Casey Dellacqua; 6–4, 6–2	(United Kingdom) Laura Robson (United Kingdom) Heather Watson	(United States) Irina Falconi (United Kingdom) Anne Keothavong	(Chinese Taipei) Chang Kai-chen (United Kingdom) Elena Baltacha (Czech Republic) Kristýna Plíšková (Chinese Taipei) Hsieh Su-wei
June 4	Zlín, Czech Republic; Clay $25,000; Singles and doubles draws	(Spain) María Teresa Torró Flor; 6–1, 1–6, 6–1	(Bosnia and Herzegovina) Jasmina Tinjić	(Colombia) Catalina Castaño (Russia) Ekaterina Ivanova	(Paraguay) Verónica Cepede Royg (Czech Republic) Renata Voráčová (Czech Republic) Kateřina Kramperová (Brazil) Teliana Pereira
June 4	Zlín, Czech Republic; Clay $25,000; Singles and doubles draws	(Bulgaria) Elitsa Kostova (Bosnia and Herzegovina) Jasmina Tinjić; 4–6, 6–1, [10–8]	(Paraguay) Verónica Cepede Royg (Brazil) Teliana Pereira	(Colombia) Catalina Castaño (Russia) Ekaterina Ivanova	(Paraguay) Verónica Cepede Royg (Czech Republic) Renata Voráčová (Czech Republic) Kateřina Kramperová (Brazil) Teliana Pereira
June 4	Qarshi, Uzbekistan; Hard $25,000; Singles and doubles draws	(Ukraine) Nadiia Kichenok; 6–3, 7–6^{(7–3)}	(Slovenia) Tadeja Majerič	(Serbia) Teodora Mirčić (Ukraine) Valentyna Ivakhnenko	(Belarus) Ksenia Milevskaya (Kazakhstan) Zarina Diyas (Kyrgyzstan) Ksenia Palkina (Ukraine) Veronika Kapshay
June 4	Qarshi, Uzbekistan; Hard $25,000; Singles and doubles draws	(Ukraine) Valentyna Ivakhnenko (Ukraine) Kateryna Kozlova; 7–5, 6–3	(Ukraine) Veronika Kapshay (Serbia) Teodora Mirčić	(Serbia) Teodora Mirčić (Ukraine) Valentyna Ivakhnenko	(Belarus) Ksenia Milevskaya (Kazakhstan) Zarina Diyas (Kyrgyzstan) Ksenia Palkina (Ukraine) Veronika Kapshay
June 4	El Paso, United States; Hard $25,000; Singles and doubles draws	(Canada) Marie-Ève Pelletier; 7–5, 6–4	(United States) Ashley Weinhold	(United States) Elizabeth Lumpkin (Russia) Valeria Solovyeva	(Ukraine) Alyona Sotnikova (United States) Elizabeth Ferris (United States) Maria Sanchez (Oman) Fatma Al Nabhani
June 4	El Paso, United States; Hard $25,000; Singles and doubles draws	(United States) Sanaz Marand (United States) Ashley Weinhold; 6–4, 6–3	(Oman) Fatma Al Nabhani (Bolivia) María Fernanda Álvarez Terán	(United States) Elizabeth Lumpkin (Russia) Valeria Solovyeva	(Ukraine) Alyona Sotnikova (United States) Elizabeth Ferris (United States) Maria Sanchez (Oman) Fatma Al Nabhani
June 4	Santos, Brazil; Clay $10,000; Singles and doubles draws	(Brazil) Ana Clara Duarte; 6–2, 3–6, 6–1	(Chile) Fernanda Brito	(Brazil) Carla Forte (Brazil) Nathaly Kurata	(Brazil) Roxane Vaisemberg (Brazil) Eduarda Piai (Paraguay) Isabella Robbiani (Brazil) Vivian Segnini
June 4	Santos, Brazil; Clay $10,000; Singles and doubles draws	(Brazil) Eduarda Piai (Brazil) Karina Venditti; 6–3, 7–6^{(7–4)}	(Brazil) Gabriela Cé (Brazil) Raquel Piltcher	(Brazil) Carla Forte (Brazil) Nathaly Kurata	(Brazil) Roxane Vaisemberg (Brazil) Eduarda Piai (Paraguay) Isabella Robbiani (Brazil) Vivian Segnini
June 4	Amarante, Portugal; Hard $10,000; Singles and doubles draws	(France) Virginie Ayassamy; 6–4, 1–6, 6–2	(Portugal) Joana Valle Costa	(Poland) Olga Brózda (Spain) Nuria Párrizas Díaz	(Brazil) Nathália Rossi (Slovenia) Anja Prislan (Switzerland) Gaëlle Rey (Australia) Alexandra Nancarrow
June 4	Amarante, Portugal; Hard $10,000; Singles and doubles draws	(Mexico) Ivette López (Spain) Nuria Párrizas Díaz; Walkover	(Poland) Olga Brózda (Poland) Natalia Kołat	(Poland) Olga Brózda (Spain) Nuria Párrizas Díaz	(Brazil) Nathália Rossi (Slovenia) Anja Prislan (Switzerland) Gaëlle Rey (Australia) Alexandra Nancarrow
June 4	Ağrı, Turkey; Carpet $10,000; Singles and doubles draws	(Turkey) Başak Eraydın; 6–3, 6–3	(Austria) Jeannine Prentner	(Turkey) Seda Arantekin (Russia) Yana Sizikova	(Russia) Alexandra Romanova (Russia) Margarita Lazareva (Italy) Linda Mair (Australia) Marisa Gianotti
June 4	Ağrı, Turkey; Carpet $10,000; Singles and doubles draws	(Russia) Alexandra Romanova (Slovakia) Chantal Škamlová; 6–3, 4–6, [10–7]	(Australia) Abbie Myers (Russia) Yana Sizikova	(Turkey) Seda Arantekin (Russia) Yana Sizikova	(Russia) Alexandra Romanova (Russia) Margarita Lazareva (Italy) Linda Mair (Australia) Marisa Gianotti
June 4	Taipei, Chinese Taipei; Hard $10,000; Singles and doubles draws	(Thailand) Nungnadda Wannasuk; 6–4, 7–6^{(7–3)}	(Chinese Taipei) Chan Chin-wei	(Japan) Miyabi Inoue (Japan) Emi Mutaguchi	(Chinese Taipei) Lee Hua-chen (Hong Kong) Venise Chan (Japan) Miharu Imanishi (Thailand) Nicha Lertpitaksinchai
June 4	Taipei, Chinese Taipei; Hard $10,000; Singles and doubles draws	(Chinese Taipei) Kao Shao-yuan (Chinese Taipei) Lee Hua-chen; 6–3, 6–3	(Chinese Taipei) Hsu Ching-wen (Chinese Taipei) Lee Ya-hsuan	(Japan) Miyabi Inoue (Japan) Emi Mutaguchi	(Chinese Taipei) Lee Hua-chen (Hong Kong) Venise Chan (Japan) Miharu Imanishi (Thailand) Nicha Lertpitaksinchai
June 4	Sarajevo, Bosnia and Herzegovina; Clay $10,000; Singles and doubles draws	(Romania) Camelia Hristea; 6–3, 3–6, 6–4	(Croatia) Bernarda Pera	(Germany) Nina Zander (Montenegro) Vladica Babić	(Slovenia) Tjaša Šrimpf (Czech Republic) Tereza Malíková (Serbia) Jovana Jakšić (Romania) Cristina Dinu
June 4	Sarajevo, Bosnia and Herzegovina; Clay $10,000; Singles and doubles draws	(Serbia) Barbara Bonić (Croatia) Neda Koprčina; 2–6, 7–5, [10–8]	(Slovakia) Dagmara Bašková (Czech Republic) Tereza Malíková	(Germany) Nina Zander (Montenegro) Vladica Babić	(Slovenia) Tjaša Šrimpf (Czech Republic) Tereza Malíková (Serbia) Jovana Jakšić (Romania) Cristina Dinu
June 11	Open GDF SUEZ de Marseille; Marseille, France; Clay $100,000; Singles – Doubles	(Spain) Lourdes Domínguez Lino; 6–3, 6–3	(France) Pauline Parmentier	(United States) Jessica Pegula (Italy) Nastassja Burnett	(Spain) Beatriz García Vidagany (France) Caroline Garcia (United States) Julia Cohen (Liechtenstein) Stephanie Vogt
June 11	Open GDF SUEZ de Marseille; Marseille, France; Clay $100,000; Singles – Doubles	(France) Séverine Beltrame (France) Laura Thorpe; 6–1, 6–4	(Germany) Kristina Barrois (Ukraine) Olga Savchuk	(United States) Jessica Pegula (Italy) Nastassja Burnett	(Spain) Beatriz García Vidagany (France) Caroline Garcia (United States) Julia Cohen (Liechtenstein) Stephanie Vogt
June 11	Trofeul Popeci; Craiova, Romania; Clay $50,000+H; Singles – Doubles	(Spain) María Teresa Torró Flor; 6–3, 6–4	(Romania) Andreea Mitu	(Argentina) María Irigoyen (Russia) Irina Khromacheva	(Serbia) Aleksandra Krunić (Romania) Cristina Dinu (Romania) Raluca Olaru (Belgium) Kirsten Flipkens
June 11	Trofeul Popeci; Craiova, Romania; Clay $50,000+H; Singles – Doubles	(Czech Republic) Renata Voráčová (Slovakia) Lenka Wienerová; 2–6, 6–3, [10–6]	(Poland) Paula Kania (Russia) Irina Khromacheva	(Argentina) María Irigoyen (Russia) Irina Khromacheva	(Serbia) Aleksandra Krunić (Romania) Cristina Dinu (Romania) Raluca Olaru (Belgium) Kirsten Flipkens
June 11	AEGON Nottingham Challenge; Nottingham, United Kingdom; Grass $50,000; Singles – Doubles	(Australia) Ashleigh Barty; 6–1, 6–1	(Germany) Tatjana Malek	(Belarus) Anastasiya Yakimova (Czech Republic) Karolína Plíšková	(Russia) Marta Sirotkina (Switzerland) Amra Sadiković (United States) Madison Brengle (Romania) Mihaela Buzărnescu
June 11	AEGON Nottingham Challenge; Nottingham, United Kingdom; Grass $50,000; Singles – Doubles	(Australia) Ashleigh Barty (Australia) Sally Peers; 7–6^{(7–2)}, 3–6, [10–5]	(Hungary) Réka-Luca Jani (Portugal) Maria João Koehler	(Belarus) Anastasiya Yakimova (Czech Republic) Karolína Plíšková	(Russia) Marta Sirotkina (Switzerland) Amra Sadiković (United States) Madison Brengle (Romania) Mihaela Buzărnescu
June 11	Bukhara, Uzbekistan; Hard $25,000; Singles and doubles draws	(Kazakhstan) Zarina Diyas; 6–0, 6–0	(Ukraine) Lyudmyla Kichenok	(Uzbekistan) Sabina Sharipova (Serbia) Teodora Mirčić	(Ukraine) Veronika Kapshay (Ukraine) Kateryna Kozlova (Japan) Akiko Omae (Chile) Andrea Koch Benvenuto
June 11	Bukhara, Uzbekistan; Hard $25,000; Singles and doubles draws	(Ukraine) Lyudmyla Kichenok (Ukraine) Nadiia Kichenok; 7–5, 7–5	(Ukraine) Valentyna Ivakhnenko (Ukraine) Kateryna Kozlova	(Uzbekistan) Sabina Sharipova (Serbia) Teodora Mirčić	(Ukraine) Veronika Kapshay (Ukraine) Kateryna Kozlova (Japan) Akiko Omae (Chile) Andrea Koch Benvenuto
June 11	Padua, Italy; Clay $25,000; Singles and doubles draws	(Germany) Anna-Lena Friedsam; 6–2, 6–2	(Italy) Corinna Dentoni	(Latvia) Diāna Marcinkēviča (Italy) Giulia Gatto-Monticone	(Bulgaria) Aleksandrina Naydenova (Poland) Katarzyna Piter (Italy) Anastasia Grymalska (Switzerland) Lisa Sabino
June 11	Padua, Italy; Clay $25,000; Singles and doubles draws	(Italy) Gioia Barbieri (Italy) Anastasia Grymalska; 6–2, 6–1	(Italy) Federica Grazioso (Switzerland) Lisa Sabino	(Latvia) Diāna Marcinkēviča (Italy) Giulia Gatto-Monticone	(Bulgaria) Aleksandrina Naydenova (Poland) Katarzyna Piter (Italy) Anastasia Grymalska (Switzerland) Lisa Sabino
June 11	Erzincan, Turkey; Hard $10,000; Singles and doubles draws	(Slovakia) Chantal Škamlová; 6–1, 6–1	(Austria) Jeannine Prentner	(Turkey) Başak Eraydın (Germany) Alina Wessel	(Australia) Abbie Myers (Russia) Margarita Lazareva (Georgia (country)) Tamari Chalaganidze (Italy) Lina Mair
June 11	Erzincan, Turkey; Hard $10,000; Singles and doubles draws	(Slovakia) Chantal Škamlová (Germany) Alina Wessel; 6–0, 6–4	(Austria) Jeannine Prentner (Russia) Evgeniya Svintsova	(Turkey) Başak Eraydın (Germany) Alina Wessel	(Australia) Abbie Myers (Russia) Margarita Lazareva (Georgia (country)) Tamari Chalaganidze (Italy) Lina Mair
June 11	Jablonec nad Nisou, Czech Republic; Clay $10,000; Singles and doubles draws	(Czech Republic) Klára Fabíková; 6–4, 6–1	(Czech Republic) Kateřina Kramperová	(Germany) Bianca Koch (Czech Republic) Petra Krejsová	(Italy) Alice Balducci (Italy) Vivienne Vierin (Czech Republic) Tereza Martincová (Hungary) Vanda Lukács
June 11	Jablonec nad Nisou, Czech Republic; Clay $10,000; Singles and doubles draws	(Russia) Victoria Kan (Czech Republic) Kateřina Siniaková; 6–4, 6–3	(Czech Republic) Martina Borecká (Czech Republic) Petra Krejsová	(Germany) Bianca Koch (Czech Republic) Petra Krejsová	(Italy) Alice Balducci (Italy) Vivienne Vierin (Czech Republic) Tereza Martincová (Hungary) Vanda Lukács
June 11	Meppel, Netherlands; Clay $10,000; Singles and doubles draws	(Belgium) Ysaline Bonaventure; 6–2, 6–4	(Germany) Julia Kimmelmann	(Russia) Varvara Flink (Germany) Anne Schäfer	(Netherlands) Cindy Burger (Netherlands) Valeria Podda (Netherlands) Nicolette van Uitert (Spain) Lucía Cervera Vázquez
June 11	Meppel, Netherlands; Clay $10,000; Singles and doubles draws	(Belgium) Ysaline Bonaventure (Netherlands) Nicolette van Uitert; 6–1, 4–6, [10–7]	(Netherlands) Marrit Boonstra (Germany) Vivian Heisen	(Russia) Varvara Flink (Germany) Anne Schäfer	(Netherlands) Cindy Burger (Netherlands) Valeria Podda (Netherlands) Nicolette van Uitert (Spain) Lucía Cervera Vázquez
June 11	Tokyo, Japan; Hard $10,000; Singles and doubles draws	(Japan) Nao Hibino; 6–0, 6–2	(Japan) Mari Tanaka	(Japan) Miharu Imanishi (Japan) Akiko Yonemura	(Japan) Miho Kowase (Japan) Aki Yamasoto (Japan) Yumi Miyazaki (Thailand) Nungnadda Wannasuk
June 11	Tokyo, Japan; Hard $10,000; Singles and doubles draws	(Japan) Maiko Inoue (Japan) Kaori Onishi; 5–7, 7–5, [10–7]	(Japan) Akari Inoue (Japan) Hiroko Kuwata	(Japan) Miharu Imanishi (Japan) Akiko Yonemura	(Japan) Miho Kowase (Japan) Aki Yamasoto (Japan) Yumi Miyazaki (Thailand) Nungnadda Wannasuk
June 11	Bethany Beach, United States; Clay $10,000; Singles and doubles draws	(Serbia) Vojislava Lukić; 6–2, 7–5	(United States) Sanaz Marand	(United States) Alexis King (Ukraine) Anastasia Kharchenko	(United States) Katrine Steffensen (Russia) Nika Kukharchuk (United States) Jacqueline Cako (Ukraine) Mariya Slupska
June 11	Bethany Beach, United States; Clay $10,000; Singles and doubles draws	(United States) Jacqueline Cako (United States) Sanaz Marand; 6–1, 6–2	(Ukraine) Anastasia Kharchenko (Russia) Nika Kukharchuk	(United States) Alexis King (Ukraine) Anastasia Kharchenko	(United States) Katrine Steffensen (Russia) Nika Kukharchuk (United States) Jacqueline Cako (Ukraine) Mariya Slupska
June 18	Goyang, South Korea; Hard $25,000; Singles and doubles draws	(China) Duan Yingying; 6–3, 6–3	(Hong Kong) Zhang Ling	(Thailand) Varatchaya Wongteanchai (South Korea) Han Sung-hee	(Chinese Taipei) Chan Chin-wei (China) Liang Chen (China) Lu Jiajing (South Korea) Lee So-ra
June 18	Goyang, South Korea; Hard $25,000; Singles and doubles draws	(China) Liu Wanting (China) Sun Shengnan; 6–7^{(1–7)}, 6–3, [10–7]	(Thailand) Nicha Lertpitaksinchai (Thailand) Peangtarn Plipuech	(Thailand) Varatchaya Wongteanchai (South Korea) Han Sung-hee	(Chinese Taipei) Chan Chin-wei (China) Liang Chen (China) Lu Jiajing (South Korea) Lee So-ra
June 18	Montpellier, France; Clay $25,000; Singles and doubles draws	(France) Séverine Beltrame; 6–2, 7–6^{(7–4)}	(Colombia) Catalina Castaño	(Argentina) María Irigoyen (Puerto Rico) Monica Puig	(Kazakhstan) Yulia Putintseva (Italy) Corinna Dentoni (Italy) Gioia Barbieri (France) Alizé Lim
June 18	Montpellier, France; Clay $25,000; Singles and doubles draws	(France) Séverine Beltrame (France) Laura Thorpe; 4–6, 6–4, [10–6]	(Argentina) Mailen Auroux (Argentina) María Irigoyen	(Argentina) María Irigoyen (Puerto Rico) Monica Puig	(Kazakhstan) Yulia Putintseva (Italy) Corinna Dentoni (Italy) Gioia Barbieri (France) Alizé Lim
June 18	Lenzerheide, Switzerland; Clay $25,000; Singles and doubles draws	(Serbia) Aleksandra Krunić; 6–3, 6–3	(United States) Chiara Scholl	(Switzerland) Timea Bacsinszky (Croatia) Ana Vrljić	(Bulgaria) Isabella Shinikova (Slovenia) Nastja Kolar (Liechtenstein) Stephanie Vogt (Georgia (country)) Sofia Kvatsabaia
June 18	Lenzerheide, Switzerland; Clay $25,000; Singles and doubles draws	(Serbia) Aleksandra Krunić (Croatia) Ana Vrljić; 6–2, 6–4	(Russia) Ksenia Lykina (Bulgaria) Isabella Shinikova	(Switzerland) Timea Bacsinszky (Croatia) Ana Vrljić	(Bulgaria) Isabella Shinikova (Slovenia) Nastja Kolar (Liechtenstein) Stephanie Vogt (Georgia (country)) Sofia Kvatsabaia
June 18	Cologne, Germany; Clay $10,000; Singles and doubles draws	(Germany) Julia Kimmelmann; 6–2, 1–6, 7–5	(Croatia) Jelena Pandžić	(Czech Republic) Klára Fabíková (Germany) Vanessa Henke	(Croatia) Iva Primorac (Austria) Yvonne Neuwirth (Germany) Julia Wachaczyk (Germany) Verena Schmid
June 18	Cologne, Germany; Clay $10,000; Singles and doubles draws	(Italy) Julia Mayr (Bulgaria) Dalia Zafirova; 6–1, 6–1	(Brazil) Nathália Rossi (Argentina) Carolina Zeballos	(Czech Republic) Klára Fabíková (Germany) Vanessa Henke	(Croatia) Iva Primorac (Austria) Yvonne Neuwirth (Germany) Julia Wachaczyk (Germany) Verena Schmid
June 18	Istanbul, Turkey; Hard $10,000; Singles and doubles draws	(Russia) Yuliya Kalabina; 6–2, 6–2	(Russia) Ksenia Kirillova	(Finland) Johanna Hyöty (Romania) Ana Bogdan	(Bulgaria) Julia Stamatova (Kyrgyzstan) Bermet Duvanaeva (Romania) Jaqueline Adina Cristian (Romania) Stefana Andrei
June 18	Istanbul, Turkey; Hard $10,000; Singles and doubles draws	(Brazil) Beatriz Maria Martins Cecato (Australia) Abbie Myers; 6–1, 7–6^{(9–7)}	(Russia) Diana Isaeva (Russia) Ksenia Kirillova	(Finland) Johanna Hyöty (Romania) Ana Bogdan	(Bulgaria) Julia Stamatova (Kyrgyzstan) Bermet Duvanaeva (Romania) Jaqueline Adina Cristian (Romania) Stefana Andrei
June 18	Craiova, Romania; Clay $10,000; Singles and doubles draws	(Romania) Sabina Lupu; 6–2, 6–4	(Netherlands) Daniëlle Harmsen	(Romania) Laura-Ioana Andrei (Romania) Diana Buzean	(China) Liu Min (Romania) Simona Ionescu (Romania) Patricia Maria Țig (Romania) Raluca Elena Platon
June 18	Craiova, Romania; Clay $10,000; Singles and doubles draws	(Romania) Camelia Hristea (Romania) Alice-Andrada Radu; 6–0, 3–6, [10–6]	(Romania) Laura-Ioana Andrei (Romania) Raluca Elena Platon	(Romania) Laura-Ioana Andrei (Romania) Diana Buzean	(China) Liu Min (Romania) Simona Ionescu (Romania) Patricia Maria Țig (Romania) Raluca Elena Platon
June 18	Williamsburg, United States; Clay $10,000; Singles and doubles draws	(Serbia) Vojislava Lukić; 6–1, 6–3	(United States) Caroline Doyle	(Russia) Nika Kukharchuk (Romania) Daiana Negreanu	(United States) Jacqueline Cako (Canada) Sonja Molnar (United States) Denise Starr (Ukraine) Anastasia Kharchenko
June 18	Williamsburg, United States; Clay $10,000; Singles and doubles draws	(United Kingdom) Laura Deigman (Republic of Ireland) Julia Moriarty; 6–4, 6–4	(United States) Jacqueline Cako (United States) Whitney Jones	(Russia) Nika Kukharchuk (Romania) Daiana Negreanu	(United States) Jacqueline Cako (Canada) Sonja Molnar (United States) Denise Starr (Ukraine) Anastasia Kharchenko
June 18	Mie, Japan; Grass $10,000; Singles and doubles draws	(Japan) Nao Hibino; 6–2, 0–6, 6–3	(Japan) Yurina Koshino	(Japan) Miyabi Inoue (Japan) Hiroko Kuwata	(Japan) Kaori Onishi (Chinese Taipei) Lee Ya-hsuan (Japan) Eri Hozumi (Japan) Akiko Yonemura
June 18	Mie, Japan; Grass $10,000; Singles and doubles draws	(Japan) Hiroko Kuwata (Japan) Yuuki Tanaka; 6–3, 3–6, [10–5]	(Japan) Akari Inoue (Japan) Kaori Onishi	(Japan) Miyabi Inoue (Japan) Hiroko Kuwata	(Japan) Kaori Onishi (Chinese Taipei) Lee Ya-hsuan (Japan) Eri Hozumi (Japan) Akiko Yonemura
June 18	Niš, Serbia; Clay $10,000; Singles and doubles draws	(Serbia) Natalija Kostić; 3–6, 6–2, 6–3	(Croatia) Indire Akiki	(Bulgaria) Viktoriya Tomova (North Macedonia) Lina Gjorcheska	(Bulgaria) Tsveta Dimitrova (Turkey) Hülya Esen (Serbia) Andjela Novčić (Serbia) Jovana Jakšić
June 18	Niš, Serbia; Clay $10,000; Singles and doubles draws	(Turkey) Hülya Esen (Turkey) Lütfiye Esen; 3–6, 7–6^{(7–2)}, [10–6]	(North Macedonia) Lina Gjorcheska (Russia) Maria Mokh	(Bulgaria) Viktoriya Tomova (North Macedonia) Lina Gjorcheska	(Bulgaria) Tsveta Dimitrova (Turkey) Hülya Esen (Serbia) Andjela Novčić (Serbia) Jovana Jakšić
June 18	New Delhi, India; Hard $10,000; Singles and doubles draws	(India) Ankita Raina; 6–4, 6–2	(India) Prerna Bhambri	(India) Rutuja Bhosale (Japan) Mari Tanaka	(Slovenia) Anja Prislan (India) Nidhi Chilumula (Hong Kong) Katherine Ip (India) Rishika Sunkara
June 18	New Delhi, India; Hard $10,000; Singles and doubles draws	(India) Aishwarya Agrawal (India) Ankita Raina; 6–1, 6–4	(Israel) Ester Masuri (Hungary) Naomi Totka	(India) Rutuja Bhosale (Japan) Mari Tanaka	(Slovenia) Anja Prislan (India) Nidhi Chilumula (Hong Kong) Katherine Ip (India) Rishika Sunkara
June 18	Alkmaar, Netherlands; Clay $10,000; Singles and doubles draws	(Slovakia) Kristína Kučová; 6–3, 6–4	(Austria) Janina Toljan	(Germany) Katharina Lehnert (Belgium) Elyne Boeykens	(Germany) Carolin Daniels (Netherlands) Cindy Burger (Belgium) Ysaline Bonaventure (Russia) Karina Isayan
June 18	Alkmaar, Netherlands; Clay $10,000; Singles and doubles draws	(Belgium) Elyne Boeykens (United States) Caitlin Whoriskey; 6–2, 6–4	(Germany) Carolin Daniels (Belarus) Sviatlana Pirazhenka	(Germany) Katharina Lehnert (Belgium) Elyne Boeykens	(Germany) Carolin Daniels (Netherlands) Cindy Burger (Belgium) Ysaline Bonaventure (Russia) Karina Isayan
June 18	Kristinehamn, Sweden; Clay $25,000; Singles and doubles draws	(Australia) Sacha Jones; 6–4, 6–4	(Poland) Magda Linette	(Belarus) Ilona Kremen (Russia) Elena Bovina	(Russia) Valeria Solovyeva (Sweden) Sandra Roma (United Kingdom) Amanda Carreras (Brazil) Vivian Segnini
June 18	Kristinehamn, Sweden; Clay $25,000; Singles and doubles draws	(Russia) Elena Bovina (Russia) Valeria Solovyeva; 6–2, 6–2	(Belarus) Viktoryia Kisialeva (Belarus) Ilona Kremen	(Belarus) Ilona Kremen (Russia) Elena Bovina	(Russia) Valeria Solovyeva (Sweden) Sandra Roma (United Kingdom) Amanda Carreras (Brazil) Vivian Segnini
June 18	Campobasso, Italy; Clay $10,000; Singles and doubles draws	(Italy) Federica di Sarra; 7–5, 6–2	(Armenia) Ani Amiraghyan	(Italy) Martina Di Giuseppe (Germany) Bianca Koch	(Italy) Martina Caciotti (Italy) Giulia Sussarello (Italy) Alice Moroni (Italy) Giulia Pairone
June 18	Campobasso, Italy; Clay $10,000; Singles and doubles draws	(Italy) Federica di Sarra (Italy) Giulia Pairone; 6–2, 6–1	(Italy) Giulia Gasparri (Italy) Giulia Sussarello	(Italy) Martina Di Giuseppe (Germany) Bianca Koch	(Italy) Martina Caciotti (Italy) Giulia Sussarello (Italy) Alice Moroni (Italy) Giulia Pairone
June 18	Madrid, Spain; Clay $10,000; Singles and doubles draws	(Germany) Laura Schaeder; 0–6, 7–5, 6–4	(Spain) Rocío de la Torre Sánchez	(Spain) Lucía Cervera Vázquez (Germany) Lena-Marie Hofmann	(Russia) Aleksandra Zenovka (Argentina) Tatiana Búa (Spain) Olga Sáez Larra (Japan) Kana Daniel
June 18	Madrid, Spain; Clay $10,000; Singles and doubles draws	(Argentina) Tatiana Búa (Argentina) Melina Ferrero; 6–4, 6–1	(Portugal) Margarida Moura (Spain) Olga Parres Azcoitia	(Spain) Lucía Cervera Vázquez (Germany) Lena-Marie Hofmann	(Russia) Aleksandra Zenovka (Argentina) Tatiana Búa (Spain) Olga Sáez Larra (Japan) Kana Daniel
June 18	Sharm el-Sheikh, Egypt; Hard $10,000; Singles and doubles draws	(Hong Kong) Venise Chan; 6–7^{(5–7)}, 6–3, 6–4	(Russia) Ekaterina Yashina	(Russia) Anna Morgina (Mexico) Nadia Abdalá	(Russia) Polina Monova (Russia) Alisa Danilova (Russia) Alina Mikheeva (Kazakhstan) Ekaterina Klyueva
June 18	Sharm el-Sheikh, Egypt; Hard $10,000; Singles and doubles draws	(United Kingdom) Sabrina Bamburac (Serbia) Barbara Bonić; 6–4, 7–6^{(7–0)}	(Russia) Polina Monova (Russia) Ekaterina Yashina	(Russia) Anna Morgina (Mexico) Nadia Abdalá	(Russia) Polina Monova (Russia) Alisa Danilova (Russia) Alina Mikheeva (Kazakhstan) Ekaterina Klyueva
June 25	Incheon, South Korea; Hard $25,000; Singles and doubles draws	(Chinese Taipei) Chan Chin-wei; 3–6, 6–2, 6–1	(Hong Kong) Zhang Ling	(Thailand) Luksika Kumkhum (Thailand) Nicha Lertpitaksinchai	(China) Duan Yingying (Japan) Miki Miyamura (China) Zhang Kailin (Japan) Aiko Nakamura
June 25	Incheon, South Korea; Hard $25,000; Singles and doubles draws	(China) Liang Chen (China) Sun Shengnan; 6–3, 6–2	(South Korea) Kim Ji-young (South Korea) Yoo Mi	(Thailand) Luksika Kumkhum (Thailand) Nicha Lertpitaksinchai	(China) Duan Yingying (Japan) Miki Miyamura (China) Zhang Kailin (Japan) Aiko Nakamura
June 25	Périgueux, France; Clay $25,000; Singles and doubles draws	(Russia) Irina Khromacheva; 6–3, 6–2	(Puerto Rico) Monica Puig	(France) Myrtille Georges (Spain) Inés Ferrer Suárez	(Japan) Yurika Sema (Ukraine) Maryna Zanevska (Spain) Leticia Costas (Bulgaria) Aleksandrina Naydenova
June 25	Périgueux, France; Clay $25,000; Singles and doubles draws	(Argentina) Mailen Auroux (Argentina) María Irigoyen; 6–1, 6–2	(Spain) Leticia Costas (Spain) Inés Ferrer Suárez	(France) Myrtille Georges (Spain) Inés Ferrer Suárez	(Japan) Yurika Sema (Ukraine) Maryna Zanevska (Spain) Leticia Costas (Bulgaria) Aleksandrina Naydenova
June 25	Stuttgart-Vaihingen, Germany; Clay $25,000; Singles and doubles draws	(Ukraine) Kateryna Kozlova; 3–6, 7–5, 6–4	(Argentina) Florencia Molinero	(Germany) Tatjana Malek (Tunisia) Ons Jabeur	(Liechtenstein) Stephanie Vogt (Romania) Elena Bogdan (Germany) Sarah Gronert (Germany) Katharina Lehnert
June 25	Stuttgart-Vaihingen, Germany; Clay $25,000; Singles and doubles draws	(Austria) Sandra Klemenschits (Germany) Tatjana Malek; 6–3, 6–2	(Slovakia) Lenka Juríková (Slovakia) Zuzana Luknárová	(Germany) Tatjana Malek (Tunisia) Ons Jabeur	(Liechtenstein) Stephanie Vogt (Romania) Elena Bogdan (Germany) Sarah Gronert (Germany) Katharina Lehnert
June 25	Rome, Italy; Clay $25,000; Singles and doubles draws	(Spain) María Teresa Torró Flor; 6–3, 6–0	(Croatia) Tereza Mrdeža	(Romania) Raluca Olaru (Georgia (country)) Margalita Chakhnashvili	(Romania) Cristina Dinu (Italy) Giulia Gatto-Monticone (Italy) Nastassja Burnett (Canada) Marie-Ève Pelletier
June 25	Rome, Italy; Clay $25,000; Singles and doubles draws	(Canada) Marie-Ève Pelletier (France) Laura Thorpe; 6–0, 3–6, [10–8]	(United States) Julia Cohen (Ukraine) Valentyna Ivakhnenko	(Romania) Raluca Olaru (Georgia (country)) Margalita Chakhnashvili	(Romania) Cristina Dinu (Italy) Giulia Gatto-Monticone (Italy) Nastassja Burnett (Canada) Marie-Ève Pelletier
June 25	Balș, Romania; Clay $10,000; Singles and doubles draws	(Romania) Patricia Maria Țig; 6–4, 7–5	(Romania) Alexandra Damaschin	(Romania) Laura-Ioana Andrei (Romania) Raluca Elena Platon	(Romania) Camelia Hristea (Romania) Claudia Dumitrescu (Czech Republic) Tereza Malíková (Moldova) Anastasia Vdovenco
June 25	Balș, Romania; Clay $10,000; Singles and doubles draws	(Romania) Laura-Ioana Andrei (Romania) Raluca Elena Platon; 5–7, 6–3, [10–8]	(Romania) Camelia Hristea (Romania) Alice-Andrada Radu	(Romania) Laura-Ioana Andrei (Romania) Raluca Elena Platon	(Romania) Camelia Hristea (Romania) Claudia Dumitrescu (Czech Republic) Tereza Malíková (Moldova) Anastasia Vdovenco
June 25	Buffalo, United States; Clay $10,000; Singles and doubles draws	(United States) Jamie Loeb; 7–6^{(7–5)}, 6–2	(United States) Tornado Alicia Black	(United States) Nicole Frenkel (United States) Alexis King	(Oman) Fatma Al Nabhani (Russia) Nika Kukharchuk (United States) Jacqueline Cako (United States) Kristy Frilling
June 25	Buffalo, United States; Clay $10,000; Singles and doubles draws	(Russia) Nika Kukharchuk (United States) Jamie Loeb; 1–6, 6–3, [10–8]	(Oman) Fatma Al Nabhani (United States) Jacqueline Cako	(United States) Nicole Frenkel (United States) Alexis King	(Oman) Fatma Al Nabhani (Russia) Nika Kukharchuk (United States) Jacqueline Cako (United States) Kristy Frilling
June 25	İzmir, Turkey; Hard $10,000; Singles and doubles draws	(Russia) Yuliya Kalabina; 4–6, 6–2, 6–3	(Kyrgyzstan) Bermet Duvanaeva	(Romania) Ana Bogdan (Serbia) Teodora Mirčić	(Turkey) Melis Sezer (Greece) Agni Stefanou (Italy) Stephanie Scimone (Bosnia and Herzegovina) Melissa Šehović
June 25	İzmir, Turkey; Hard $10,000; Singles and doubles draws	(Romania) Ana Bogdan (Serbia) Teodora Mirčić; 6–3, 3–0, retired	(Australia) Abbie Myers (Turkey) Melis Sezer	(Romania) Ana Bogdan (Serbia) Teodora Mirčić	(Turkey) Melis Sezer (Greece) Agni Stefanou (Italy) Stephanie Scimone (Bosnia and Herzegovina) Melissa Šehović
June 25	Melilla, Spain; Hard $10,000; Singles and doubles draws	(Spain) Rocío de la Torre Sánchez; 6–0, 7–5	(Australia) Alexandra Nancarrow	(Japan) Kana Daniel (Spain) Carolina Prats Millán	(Romania) Diana Stomlega (Spain) María Jesús Ibáñez Galindo (Argentina) Tatiana Búa (Italy) Alessia Piran
June 25	Melilla, Spain; Hard $10,000; Singles and doubles draws	(Argentina) Tatiana Búa (Argentina) Melina Ferrero; 7–5, 6–2	(Spain) Mariona del Peral Francin (Ecuador) Charlotte Römer	(Japan) Kana Daniel (Spain) Carolina Prats Millán	(Romania) Diana Stomlega (Spain) María Jesús Ibáñez Galindo (Argentina) Tatiana Búa (Italy) Alessia Piran
June 25	Prokuplje, Serbia; Clay $10,000; Singles and doubles draws	(Croatia) Ana Savić; 6–2, 6–4	(Slovakia) Chantal Škamlová	(Serbia) Ivana Jorović (Australia) Viktorija Rajicic	(Serbia) Jovana Jakšić (Russia) Maria Mokh (Serbia) Marina Lazić (Russia) Polina Leykina
June 25	Prokuplje, Serbia; Clay $10,000; Singles and doubles draws	(North Macedonia) Lina Gjorcheska (Bulgaria) Dalia Zafirova; 6–3, 6–2	(Turkey) Hülya Esen (Turkey) Lütfiye Esen	(Serbia) Ivana Jorović (Australia) Viktorija Rajicic	(Serbia) Jovana Jakšić (Russia) Maria Mokh (Serbia) Marina Lazić (Russia) Polina Leykina
June 25	Breda, Netherlands; Clay $10,000; Singles and doubles draws	(Netherlands) Angelique van der Meet; 6–2, 6–4	(Italy) Agnese Zucchini	(Belgium) Ysaline Bonaventure (Switzerland) Xenia Knoll	(Netherlands) Nicolette van Uitert (United States) Caitlin Whoriskey (Netherlands) Bernice van de Velde (Germany) Carolin Daniels
June 25	Breda, Netherlands; Clay $10,000; Singles and doubles draws	(Belgium) Ysaline Bonaventure (Bulgaria) Isabella Shinikova; 6–4, 7–6^{(7–5)}	(Germany) Carolin Daniels (Switzerland) Xenia Knoll	(Belgium) Ysaline Bonaventure (Switzerland) Xenia Knoll	(Netherlands) Nicolette van Uitert (United States) Caitlin Whoriskey (Netherlands) Bernice van de Velde (Germany) Carolin Daniels
June 25	Ystad, Sweden; Clay $25,000; Singles and doubles draws	(Germany) Carina Witthöft; 6–2, 6–1	(Russia) Valeria Solovyeva	(Belarus) Ilona Kremen (Bosnia and Herzegovina) Mervana Jugić-Salkić	(Austria) Nicole Rottmann (Netherlands) Quirine Lemoine (Chinese Taipei) Hsu Wen-hsin (Slovenia) Petra Rampre
June 25	Ystad, Sweden; Clay $25,000; Singles and doubles draws	(Poland) Magda Linette (Poland) Katarzyna Piter; 6–3, 6–3	(Georgia (country)) Oksana Kalashnikova (Slovakia) Lenka Wienerová	(Belarus) Ilona Kremen (Bosnia and Herzegovina) Mervana Jugić-Salkić	(Austria) Nicole Rottmann (Netherlands) Quirine Lemoine (Chinese Taipei) Hsu Wen-hsin (Slovenia) Petra Rampre
June 25	Sharm el-Sheikh, Egypt; Hard $10,000; Singles and doubles draws	(Kazakhstan) Zalina Khairudinova; 5–7, 6–2, 7–5	(Russia) Anna Morgina	(Russia) Ekaterina Yashina (Serbia) Barbara Bonić	(Russia) Varvara Kuznetsova (Russia) Polina Monova (Mexico) Nadia Abdalá (Hong Kong) Venise Chan
June 25	Sharm el-Sheikh, Egypt; Hard $10,000; Singles and doubles draws	(Russia) Polina Monova (Russia) Ekaterina Yashina; 7–5, 4–6, [10–8]	(Kazakhstan) Kamila Kerimbayeva (Kazakhstan) Zalina Khairudinova	(Russia) Ekaterina Yashina (Serbia) Barbara Bonić	(Russia) Varvara Kuznetsova (Russia) Polina Monova (Mexico) Nadia Abdalá (Hong Kong) Venise Chan
June 25	Pattaya, Thailand; Hard $10,000; Singles and doubles draws	(Russia) Anna Tyulpa; 6–4, 6–2	(China) Zhu Lin	(Thailand) Apichaya Runglerdkriangkrai (Thailand) Nungnadda Wannasuk	(Thailand) Napatsakorn Sankaew (Japan) Yurina Koshino (Japan) Chihiro Nunome (Australia) Nives Baric
June 25	Pattaya, Thailand; Hard $10,000; Singles and doubles draws	(Australia) Tyra Calderwood (New Zealand) Dianne Hollands; 6–1, 6–3	(China) Deng Mengning (China) Zhao Qianqian	(Thailand) Apichaya Runglerdkriangkrai (Thailand) Nungnadda Wannasuk	(Thailand) Napatsakorn Sankaew (Japan) Yurina Koshino (Japan) Chihiro Nunome (Australia) Nives Baric
