= 2012 Open GDF Suez de Marseille – Singles =

Singles
- 2012 Open GDF Suez de Marseille

Final
- Champion: (Spain) Lourdes Domínguez Lino
- Runner-up: (France) Pauline Parmentier
- Score: 6–3, 6–3

Events
Singles	Doubles
← 2011 ·	Open GDF Suez de Marseille	· 2013 →

Pauline Parmentier was the defending champion, but lost in the final to Lourdes Domínguez Lino 3–6, 3–6.

== Seeds ==
1. (France) Pauline Parmentier (final)
2. (Spain) Lourdes Domínguez Lino (champion)
3. (France) Caroline Garcia (quarterfinals)
4. (United States) Julia Cohen (quarterfinals)
5. (France) Kristina Mladenovic (first round)
6. (Slovenia) Petra Rampre (second round)
7. (Ukraine) Olga Savchuk (second round)
8. (Canada) Heidi El Tabakh (first round)

== Draw ==
=== Key ===
- Q = Qualifier
- WC = Wild card
- LL = Lucky loser
- Alt = Alternate
- SE = Special exempt
- PR = Protected ranking
- ITF = ITF entry
- JE = Junior exempt
- w/o = Walkover
- r = Retired
- d = Defaulted
- SR = Special ranking

=== Finals ===
Semifinals
1	(France) Pauline Parmentier	w/o
Q	(United States) Jessica Pegula
(Italy) Nastassja Burnett	3	4
2	(Spain) Lourdes Domínguez Lino	6	6

Final
1	(France) Pauline Parmentier	3	3
2	(Spain) Lourdes Domínguez Lino	6	6

=== Top half ===
First round
1	(France) P Parmentier	6	6
(Peru) B Botto	2	3
(France) L Thorpe	4	6	2
(France) J Coin	6	4	6
SR	(Spain) B García Vidagany	4	6	6
WC	(France) C Sibille	6	2	1
(France) A Lim	5	6	0
6	(Slovenia) P Rampre	7	0	6
3	(France) C Garcia	6	6
(Colombia) C Castaño	3	2
Q	(Spain) R de la Torre-Sánchez	6	6
(Australia) M Adamczak	4	2
(Paraguay) V Cepede Royg	6^{1}	2
Q	(United States) J Pegula	7^{7}	6
(Israel) J Glushko	5	2
7	(Ukraine) O Savchuk	7	6

Second round
1	(France) P Parmentier	6^{5}	6	6
(France) J Coin	7^{7}	4	3
SR	(Spain) B García Vidagany	6	6
6	(Slovenia) P Rampre	1	3
3	(France) C Garcia	6	6
Q	(Spain) R de la Torre-Sánchez	1	4
Q	(United States) J Pegula	6	6
7	(Ukraine) O Savchuk	2	2

Quarterfinals
1	(France) P Parmentier	6	7^{7}
SR	(Spain) B García Vidagany	1	6^{1}
3	(France) C Garcia	4	6	2
Q	(United States) J Pegula	6	2	6

Semifinals
1	(France) P Parmentier	w/o
Q	(United States) J Pegula

=== Bottom half ===
First round
8	(Canada) H El Tabakh	4	6^{2}
(Italy) N Burnett	6	7^{7}
(Brazil) T Pereira	6	6
Q	(France) M Arcangioli	1	3
WC	(France) A Laurendon	6	6
WC	(France) E Lechemia	2	4
(Spain) A Parra Santonja	2	4
4	(United States) J Cohen	6	6
5	(France) K Mladenovic	4	6^{4}
(Liechtenstein) S Vogt	6	7^{7}
(Georgia (country)) M Chakhnashvili	1	4
WC	(Belgium) A Van Uytvanck	6	6
Q	(France) M Georges	6	7
(France) S Beltrame	3	5
(Germany) K Barrois	2	2
2	(Spain) L Domínguez Lino	6	6

Second round
(Italy) N Burnett	2	6	6
(Brazil) T Pereira	6	0	1
WC	(France) A Laurendon	5	4
4	(United States) J Cohen	7	6
(Liechtenstein) S Vogt	6	6
WC	(Belgium) A Van Uytvanck	4	4
Q	(France) M Georges	3	2
2	(Spain) L Domínguez Lino	6	6

Quarterfinals
(Italy) N Burnett	6	3	6
4	(United States) J Cohen	1	6	0
(Liechtenstein) S Vogt	2	2
2	(Spain) L Domínguez Lino	6	6

Semifinals
(Italy) N Burnett	3	4
2	(Spain) L Domínguez Lino	6	6
