= 2012 Open GDF Suez de Marseille – Doubles =

Doubles
- 2012 Open GDF Suez de Marseille

Final
- Champions: (France) Séverine Beltrame (France) Laura Thorpe
- Runners-up: (Germany) Kristina Barrois (Ukraine) Olga Savchuk
- Score: 6–1, 6–4

Events
| Singles | Doubles |
- Open GDF Suez de Marseille

Irina-Camelia Begu and Nina Bratchikova were the defending champions, but both decided not to participate.

Séverine Beltrame and Laura Thorpe won the title, defeating Kristina Barrois and Olga Savchuk in the final, 6–1, 6–4.

== Seeds ==
1. (Germany) Kristina Barrois / (Ukraine) Olga Savchuk (final)
2. (France) Kristina Mladenovic / (France) Pauline Parmentier (quarterfinals)
3. (France) Julie Coin / (Czech Republic) Eva Hrdinová (semifinals)
4. (Colombia) Catalina Castaño / (France) Sophie Lefèvre (first round)

== Draw ==
Key

- Q = Qualifier
- WC = Wild card
- LL = Lucky loser
- Alt = Alternate
- ITF = ITF entry
- PR = Protected ranking
- SR = Special ranking
- SE = Special exempt
- JE = Junior exempt
- JR = Junior Accelerator Programme entrant
- CO = College Accelerator Programme entrant
- NG = Next Gen Accelerator Program entrant
- w/o = Walkover
- r = Retired
- d = Defaulted

=== Draw ===
First round
1 | (Germany) K Barrois (Ukraine) O Savchuk | 6 | 6
WC | (France) E Lechemia (France) C Sibille | 2 | 1
(Slovenia) P Rampre (China) Y Zhou | 2 | 6^{4}
(United States) A Muhammed (United States) J Pegula | 6 | 7^{7}
3 | (France) J Coin (Czech Republic) E Hrdinová | 6 | 7
(Russia) M Kondratieva (France) A Laurendon | 3 | 5
(United States) J Elie (Belgium) A Van Uytvanck | 7^{7} | 5 | [10]
WC | (France) A Hesse (Argentina) C Zeballos | 6^{5} | 7 | [5]
(Australia) M Adamczak (Australia) S Bengson | 5 | 1
(Paraguay) V Cepede Royg (United States) J Cohen | 7 | 6
(Brazil) T Pereira (Brazil) L Pigossi | 2 | 6 | [10]
4 | (Colombia) C Castaño (France) S Lefèvre | 6 | 3 | [5]
(Spain) R de la Torre-Sánchez (Liechtenstein) S Vogt | 6 | 6^{6} | [8]
(France) S Beltrame (France) L Thorpe | 3 | 7^{8} | [10]
(Israel) J Glushko (France) A Lim | 6^{2} | 3
2 | (France) K Mladenovic (France) P Parmentier | 7^{7} | 6

Quarterfinals
1 | (Germany) K Barrois (Ukraine) O Savchuk | 6 | 6
(United States) A Muhammed (United States) J Pegula | 3 | 0
3 | (France) J Coin (Czech Republic) E Hrdinová | 6 | 6
(United States) J Elie (Belgium) A Van Uytvanck | 4 | 2
(Paraguay) V Cepede Royg (United States) J Cohen | 6^{3} | 6 | [10]
(Brazil) T Pereira (Brazil) L Pigossi | 7^{7} | 1 | [6]
(France) S Beltrame (France) L Thorpe | 7^{8} | 2 | [12]
2 | (France) K Mladenovic (France) P Parmentier | 6^{6} | 6 | [10]

Semifinals
1 | (Germany) K Barrois (Ukraine) O Savchuk | 7^{7} | 2 | [10]
3 | (France) J Coin (Czech Republic) E Hrdinová | 6^{4} | 6 | [7]
(Paraguay) V Cepede Royg (United States) J Cohen | 3 | 1
(France) S Beltrame (France) L Thorpe | 6 | 6

Finals
1 | (Germany) K Barrois (Ukraine) O Savchuk | 1 | 4
(France) S Beltrame (France) L Thorpe | 6 | 6
