= 2012 Open GDF Suez de Marseille =

- Date: 11–17 June
- Edition: 15th
- Surface: Clay (outdoor)
- Location: Marseille, France

Champions

Singles
- (Spain) Lourdes Domínguez Lino

Doubles
- (France) Séverine Beltrame / (France) Laura Thorpe
- Open GDF Suez de Marseille

The 2012 Open GDF Suez de Marseille was a professional tennis tournament played on outdoor clay courts. It was the fifteenth edition of the tournament and was part of the 2012 ITF Women's Circuit. It took place in Marseille, France, on 11–17 June 2012.

== WTA entrants ==
=== Seeds ===
Country	Player	Rank^{1}	Seed
FRA	Pauline Parmentier	62	1
ESP	Lourdes Domínguez Lino	95	2
FRA	Caroline Garcia	133	3
USA	Julia Cohen	139	4
FRA	Kristina Mladenovic	158	5
SLO	Petra Rampre	171	6
UKR	Olga Savchuk	178	7
CAN	Heidi El Tabakh	186	8

- Rankings as of 28 May 2012

=== Other entrants ===
The following players received wildcards into the singles main draw:

- (France) Anaïs Laurendon
- (France) Elixane Lechemia
- (France) Constance Sibille
- (Belgium) Alison Van Uytvanck

The following players received entry from the qualifying draw:

- (France) Manon Arcangioli
- (Spain) Rocío de la Torre Sánchez
- (France) Myrtille Georges
- (United States) Jessica Pegula

The following player received entry from a special exempt spot:

- (Spain) Beatriz García Vidagany

== Champions ==
=== Singles ===
- (Spain) Lourdes Domínguez Lino def. (France) Pauline Parmentier 6–3, 6–3

=== Doubles ===
- (France) Séverine Beltrame / (France) Laura Thorpe def. (Germany) Kristina Barrois / (Ukraine) Olga Savchuk 6–1, 6–4
