= Anaïs Laurendon =

French tennis player

- Country (sports): France
- Born: 15 April 1985 (age 40) Saint-Étienne, France
- Height: 1.69 m (5 ft 7 in)
- Turned pro: 2001
- Retired: 2014
- Plays: Right (one-handed backhand)
- Prize money: $128,394

Singles
- Career record: 232–175
- Career titles: 6 ITF
- Highest ranking: No. 180 (11 October 2010)

Grand Slam singles results
- Australian Open: Q1 (2011)
- French Open: 1R (2003)
- US Open: Q1 (2010, 2011)

Doubles
- Career record: 95–88
- Career titles: 10 ITF
- Highest ranking: No. 246 (11 July 2011)

Grand Slam doubles results
- French Open: 1R (2003)

Anaïs Laurendon (born 15 April 1985) is a former French tennis player.

Her best WTA singles ranking is 180, which she reached on 11 October 2010. Her career-high in doubles is 246, attained on 11 July 2011.

Laurendon played her last match on the ITF Women's Circuit in October 2012, and retired from professional tennis in 2014.

== ITF Circuit finals ==
Legend
$25,000 tournaments
$10,000 tournaments

=== Singles: 10 (6 titles, 4 runner-ups) ===
Result	No.	Date	Tournament	Surface	Opponent	Score
Win	1.	Jul 2005	ITF Pontevedra, Spain	Clay	(France) Marina Cossou	6–2, 6–0
Loss	1.	Jul 2006	ITF Imola, Italy	Carpet	(Russia) Regina Kulikova	4–6, 2–6
Win	2.	Jun 2009	Open de Montpellier, France	Clay	(Argentina) María Emilia Salerni	6–3, 6–2
Loss	2.	Oct 2009	Open de Limoges, France	Clay	(France) Claire Feuerstein	0–6, 7–5, 3–6
Win	3.	Jan 2010	ITF Grenoble, France	Hard (i)	(France) Victoria Larrière	6–3, 6–2
Loss	3.	Mar 2010	ITF Dijon, France	Hard (i)	(Ukraine) Ganna Piven	4–6, 5–7
Win	4.	Sep 2010	Denain Open, France	Clay	(France) Stéphanie Cohen-Aloro	6–3, 7–5
Loss	4.	Jul 2011	ITF Les Contamines, France	Hard	(France) Claire Feuerstein	6–7^{(4)}, 6–2, 6–7^{(2)}
Win	5.	Apr 2012	ITF Bol, Croatia	Clay	(Croatia) Bernarda Pera	6–4, 4–6, 6–3
Win	6.	May 2012	ITF Florence, Italy	Clay	(Poland) Magda Linette	6–4, 6–4

=== Doubles: 21 (10 titles, 11 runner-ups) ===
Result	No.	Date	Tournament	Surface	Partner	Opponents	Score
Win	1.	Oct 2004	ITF Quartu Sant'Elena, Italy	Hard	(France) Aurélie Védy	(Czech Republic) Sandra Záhlavová (Italy) Raffaella Bindi	6–3, 3–6, 6–3
Loss	1.	Jan 2005	ITF Grenoble, France	Hard (i)	(France) Émilie Bacquet	(Bosnia and Herzegovina) Mervana Jugić-Salkić (Croatia) Darija Jurak	2–6, 2–6
Loss	2.	Feb 2005	ITF Albufeira, Portugal	Hard	(France) Émilie Bacquet	(Slovakia) Lenka Broosova (Slovakia) Jana Jurićova	4–6, 6–2, 2–6
Loss	3.	Feb 2005	ITF Portimão, Portugal	Hard	(Slovakia) Linda Smolenaková	(Ukraine) Irina Buryachok (Russia) Olga Panova	4–6, 2–6
Loss	4.	Jun 2006	Open de Montpellier, France	Clay	(France) Marie-Perrine Baudouin	(France) Claire Jalade (France) Amandine Singla	6–4, 3–6, 1–6
Loss	5.	Aug 2006	ITF Gardone Val Trompia, Italy	Clay	(Italy) Emelia Desiderio	(Italy) Valentina Sulpizio (Italy) Verdiana Verardi	1–6, 3–6
Win	2.	Aug 2006	ITF Jesi, Italy	Clay	(Austria) Stefanie Haidner	(France) Kildine Chevalier (Italy) Elena Vianello	6–0, 6–3
Win	3.	Sep 2006	Open de Limoges, France	Hard (i)	(Netherlands) Kika Hogendoorn	(France) Sherazad Reix (France) Chloé Gambey	6–2, 6–4
Loss	6.	Mar 2009	ITF Amiens, France	Clay (i)	(Romania) Bianca Hincu	(Poland) Olga Brózda (Poland) Magdalena Kiszczyńska	2–6, 1–6
Loss	7.	Jul 2009	ITF Les Contamines, France	Hard	(Switzerland) Nicole Riner	(Romania) Laura-Ioana Andrei (Poland) Patrycja Sanduska	2–6, 3–6
Win	4.	Mar 2010	ITF Dijon, France	Hard (i)	(France) Estelle Guisard	(Poland) Olga Brózda (Poland) Magdalena Kiszczyńska	7–5, 7–5
Win	5.	Jul 2010	ITF Vigo, Spain	Hard	(United Kingdom) Anna Smith	(Georgia (country)) Sofia Kvatsabaia (Germany) Justine Ozga	6–3, 6–1
Win	6.	Aug 2010	Ladies Open Hechingen, Germany	Clay	(Romania) Irina-Camelia Begu	(Germany) Julia Schruff (Japan) Erika Sema	6–2, 4–6, [10–8]
Loss	8.	Apr 2011	Chiasso Open, Switzerland	Clay	(France) Claire Feuerstein	(Austria) Yvonne Meusburger (Germany) Kathrin Wörle-Scheller	3–6, 3–6
Win	7.	Jul 2011	ITF Stuttgart, Germany	Clay	(Croatia) Darija Jurak	(Czech Republic) Hana Birnerová (Liechtenstein) Stephanie Vogt	4–6, 6–1, [10–0]
Win	8.	Apr 2012	ITF Bol, Croatia	Clay	(Italy) Nicole Clerico	(Czech Republic) Jesika Malečková (Czech Republic) Tereza Smitková	6–2, 6–0
Loss	9.	May 2012	ITF Florence, Italy	Clay	(Italy) Nicole Clerico	(Italy) Gioia Barbieri (Romania) Andreea Văideanu	2–6, 7–6, [8–10]
Loss	10.	Sepr 2012	ITF Rotterdam, Netherlands	Clay	(France) Morgane Pons	(Germany) Carolin Daniels (Germany) Franziska Koenig	3–6, 4–6
Win	9.	Sep 2012	ITF Antalya, Turkey	Clay	(Czech Republic) Kateřina Vaňková	(Romania) Diana Buzean (Romania) Bianca Hîncu	7–5, 6–3
Loss	11.	Oct 2012	ITF Antalya, Turkey	Clay	(Czech Republic) Kateřina Vaňková	(Ukraine) Elizaveta Ianchuk (Belarus) Sviatlana Pirazhenka	6–7^{(0)}, 6–2, [7–10]
Win	10.	Oct 2012	ITF Antalya, Turkey	Clay	(Czech Republic) Kateřina Vaňková	(Ukraine) Alona Fomina (North Macedonia) Lina Gjorcheska	6–2, 6–4
