= 2011 Fed Cup Americas Zone Group I – play-offs =

Tennis competition play-offs

The play-offs of the 2011 Fed Cup Americas Zone Group I were the final stages of the Group I Zonal Competition involving teams from the Americas. Using the positions determined in their pools, the eight teams faced off to determine their placing in the 2011 Fed Cup Americas Zone Group I, the top countries of each pool played for first to second, while the bottom two of each pool competed for fifth to eighth. The top team advanced to World Group II play-offs, and the bottom two teams were relegated down to the Americas Zone Group II for the next year.

Placing	Pool A	Pool B
1	Argentina	Colombia
2	Peru	Brazil
3	Paraguay	Chile
4	Bolivia	Mexico

== Promotional round ==
The first placed teams of each pool played in a head-to-head round. The winner advanced to the World Group II play-offs, where they'd get a chance to advance to World Group II.

=== Argentina vs. Colombia ===
Argentina
3
Tennis Club de Argentino, Buenos Aires, Argentina
February 5, 2011
Clay (outdoors)

Colombia
0

			1	2	3
1	(Argentina) (Colombia)	Florencia Molinero; Catalina Castaño	7^{7} 6^{5}	6; 1
2	(Argentina) (Colombia)	Gisela Dulko; Mariana Duque	6; 0	6; 0
3	(Argentina) (Colombia)	Mailen Auroux / María Irigoyen; Karen Castiblanco / Yuliana Lizarazo	6; 1	6; 1

== 3rd to 4th play-off ==
The second placed teams of each pool played in a head-to-head round to find the third and fourth placed teams.

=== Peru vs. Brazil ===
Peru
1
Tennis Club de Argentino, Buenos Aires, Argentina
February 5, 2011
Clay (outdoors)

Brazil
2

			1	2	3
1	(Peru) (Brazil)	Patricia Kú Flores; Teliana Pereira	0; 6	1; 6
2	(Peru) (Brazil)	Bianca Botto; Roxane Vaisemberg	7; 5	6; 0
3	(Peru) (Brazil)	Ferny Angeles Paz / Bianca Botto; Ana-Clara Duarte / Teliana Pereira	2; 6	2; 6

== Relegation play-offs ==
The last placed teams of each pool were drawn in head-to-head rounds. The loser of each round was relegated down to the Americas Zone Group II in 2012.

=== Paraguay vs. Mexico ===
Paraguay
2
Tennis Club de Argentino, Buenos Aires, Argentina
February 5, 2011
Clay (outdoors)

Mexico
1

			1	2	3
1	(Paraguay) (Mexico)	Montserrat González; Nazari Urbina	5; 7	6; 4	6; 3
2	(Paraguay) (Mexico)	Verónica Cepede Royg; Ximena Hermoso	6; 3	6; 2
3	(Paraguay) (Mexico)	Isaura Enrique Aguilar / Isabella Robbiani; Laila Abdala / Nadia Abdala	2; 6	3; 6

=== Chile vs. Bolivia ===
Chile
1
Tennis Club de Argentino, Buenos Aires, Argentina
February 5, 2011
Clay (outdoors)

Bolivia
2

			1	2	3
1	(Chile) (Bolivia)	Andrea Koch Benvenuto; María Paula Deheza	6; 2	6; 4
2	(Chile) (Bolivia)	Camila Silva; María Fernanda Álvarez Terán	4; 6	7; 5	1; 6
3	(Chile) (Bolivia)	Fernanda Brito / Andrea Koch Benvenuto; María Fernanda Álvarez Terán / María Paula Deheza	6^{5} 7^{7}	6; 4	2; 6

== Final placements ==
Placing	Teams
Promoted	Argentina
Second	Colombia
Third	Brazil
Fourth	Peru
Fifth	Paraguay
Fifth	Bolivia
Relegated	Mexico
Relegated	Chile

- Argentina advanced to the World Group II play-offs, where they were drawn against Japan. However, they lost 0–4, and thus were assigned back to Group I for 2012.
- Mexico and Chile were relegated down to the 2012 Fed Cup Americas Zone Group II. They both qualified for the promotional play-offs and won their matches, meaning they advanced back to Group I for 2013.

== See also ==
- Fed Cup structure
