= Tennis at the 2014 South American Games =

Champions

Men's singles
- Facundo Bagnis (ARG)

Women's singles
- Paula Cristina Gonçalves (BRA)

Men's doubles
- Guido Andreozzi and Facundo Bagnis (ARG)

Women's doubles
- Andrea Gámiz and Adriana Pérez (VEN)

Mixed doubles
- David Souto and Adriana Pérez (VEN)
← 2010 ·	South American Games	· 2018 →

There were five tennis events at the 2014 South American Games. The events were held over 10–16 March.

== Medalists ==
Event	Gold	Silver	Bronze
Men's events
Men's singles	Facundo Bagnis; Argentina	Guido Andreozzi; Argentina	Paul Capdeville; Chile
Men's doubles	Guido Andreozzi and Facundo Bagnis; Argentina	Nicolás Barrientos and Carlos Salamanca; Colombia	Jorge Aguilar and Paul Capdeville; Chile
Women's events
Women's singles	Paula Cristina Gonçalves; Brazil	Verónica Cepede Royg; Paraguay	Bianca Botto; Peru
Women's doubles	Andrea Gámiz and Adriana Pérez; Venezuela	Verónica Cepede Royg and Montserrat González; Paraguay	Paula Cristina Gonçalves and Laura Pigossi; Brazil
Mixed events
Mixed doubles	David Souto and Adriana Pérez; Venezuela	Nicolás Jarry and Camila Silva; Chile	Jorge Aguilar and Andrea Koch Benvenuto; Chile

Medal table

Rank	Nation	Gold	Silver	Bronze	Total
1	Argentina (ARG)	2	1	0	3
2	Venezuela (VEN)	2	0	0	2
3	Brazil (BRA)	1	0	1	2
4	Paraguay (PAR)	0	2	0	2
5	Chile (CHI)	0	1	3	4
6	Colombia (COL)	0	1	0	1
7	Peru (PER)	0	0	1	1
Totals (7 entries)		5	5	5	15
