= Tennis at the 2014 South American Games – Women's doubles =

Women's doubles
- Tennis at the 2014 South American Games

Final
- Champions: (Venezuela) Adriana Pérez (Venezuela) Andrea Gamiz
- Runners-up: (Paraguay) Verónica Cepede Royg (Paraguay) Montserrat González
- Score: 7–6^{(9–7)}, 3–6, [10–5]

Events
Singles	men	women
Doubles	men	women	mixed
- South American Games

The women's doubles tennis tournament at the 2014 South American Games in Santiago was held from 12 to 15 March on the clay courts of the Estadio Nacional Julio Martínez Prádanos in Ñuñoa.

Tie-breaks were used for the first two sets of each match, which was the best of three sets. If the score was tied at one set all, a 'super tie-break' (the first pairing to win at least 10 points by a margin of two points) would be used.

Chileans Fernanda Reyes and Cecilia Costa Melgar were the defending champions, but Reyes was not eligible by her national delegation in this edition. Costa Melgar played alongside Daniela Seguel and they finished in fourth place, being defeated by Brazilians Paula Cristina Gonçalves and Laura Pigossi in the bronze medal match, 7–6^{(7–4)}, 7–5.

Venezuelans Adriana Pérez and Andrea Gamiz defeated Paraguayans Verónica Cepede Royg and Montserrat González 7–6^{(9–7)}, 3–6, [10–5] in the final to claim the first gold medal for Venezuela in the tennis competition.

== Calendar ==
Matches took place between 12 and 15 March.

March
12	13	14	15
10:00	10:00	10:00	10:00
Round of 16	Quarterfinals	Semifinals	Bronze medal match Gold medal match

== Seeds ==
1. Paula Cristina Gonçalves (BRA) / Laura Pigossi (BRA) (semifinals, bronze medalists)
2. Cecilia Costa Melgar (CHI) / Daniela Seguel (CHI) (semifinals, fourth place)
3. Andrea Gamiz (VEN) / Adriana Pérez (VEN) (champions, gold medalists)
4. Verónica Cepede Royg (PAR) / Montserrat González (PAR) (final, silver medalists)

== Results ==
Key

- Q = Qualifier
- WC = Wild card
- LL = Lucky loser
- Alt = Alternate
- ITF = ITF entry
- PR = Protected ranking
- SR = Special ranking
- SE = Special exempt
- JE = Junior exempt
- JR = Junior Accelerator Programme entrant
- CO = College Accelerator Programme entrant
- NG = Next Gen Accelerator Program entrant
- w/o = Walkover
- r = Retired
- d = Defaulted

=== Draw ===
First round
F Brito (CHI); C Silva (CHI)	6	6
M Herazo (COL); MP Pérez (COL)	3	4
V Bosio (ARG); N Podoroska (ARG)	6	6
M Boado (URU); C de los Santos (URU)	3	1
M Demichelli (PER); P Kú Flores (PER)	3	7	[4]
L Paredes (ECU); AC Pérez (ECU)	6	5	[10]

Quarterfinals
1	PC Gonçalves (BRA); L Pigossi (BRA)	6	5	[10]
F Brito (CHI); C Silva (CHI)	1	7	[7]
3	A Gamiz (VEN); A Pérez (VEN)	6	6
IV Boada (BOL); N Zeballos (BOL)	2	1
V Bosio (ARG); N Podoroska (ARG)	3	2
4	V Cepede Royg (PAR); M González (PAR)	6	6
L Paredes (ECU); AC Pérez (ECU)	4	1
2	C Costa Melgar (CHI); D Seguel (CHI)	6	6

Semifinals
1	PC Gonçalves (BRA); L Pigossi (BRA)	2	7^{7}	[5]
3	A Gamiz (VEN); A Pérez (VEN)	6	6^{3}	[10]
4	V Cepede Royg (PAR); M González (PAR)	6^{3}	6	[10]
2	C Costa Melgar (CHI); D Seguel (CHI)	7^{7}	4	[7]

Gold medal match
3	A Gamiz (VEN); A Pérez (VEN)	7^{9}	3	[10]
4	V Cepede Royg (PAR); M González (PAR)	6^{7}	6	[5]
Bronze medal match
1	PC Gonçalves (BRA); L Pigossi (BRA)	7^{7}	7
2	C Costa Melgar (CHI); D Seguel (CHI)	6^{4}	5
