= 2011 Fed Cup Americas Zone Group I – Pool B =

International tennis competition

Group B of the 2011 Fed Cup Americas Zone Group I was one of two pools in the Asia/Oceania zone of the 2011 Fed Cup. Four teams competed in a round robin competition, with the top team and the bottom two teams proceeding to their respective sections of the play-offs: the top teams played for advancement to the World Group II Play-offs, while the bottom teams faced potential relegation to Group II.

		(Colombia) COL	(Brazil) BRA	(Chile) CHI	(Mexico) MEX	RR; W–L	Set; W–L	Game; W–L	Standings
22	Colombia		2–1	3–0	3–0	3–0	16–4	113–74	1
36	Brazil	1–2		2–1	3–0	2–1	13–6	98–74	2
42	Chile	0–3	1–2		2–1	1–2	6–13	87–97	3
49	Mexico	0–3	0–3	1–2		0–3	4–16	59–112	4

== Colombia vs. Mexico ==
Colombia
3
Tennis Club de Argentino, Buenos Aires, Argentina
February 2, 2011
Clay (outdoors)

Mexico
0

			1	2	3
1	(Colombia) (Mexico)	Catalina Castaño; Nazari Urbina	6; 1	6; 3
2	(Colombia) (Mexico)	Mariana Duque Mariño; Ximena Hermoso	4; 6	6; 0	6; 3
3	(Colombia) (Mexico)	Karen Castiblanco / Mariana Duque Mariño; Lalia Abdala / Nadia Abdala	3; 6	6; 3	6; 2

== Brazil vs. Chile ==
Brazil
2
Tennis Club de Argentino, Buenos Aires, Argentina
February 2, 2011
Clay (outdoors)

Chile
1

			1	2	3
1	(Brazil) (Chile)	Roxane Vaisemberg; Andrea Koch-Benvenuto	7; 5	7; 5
2	(Brazil) (Chile)	Ana-Clara Duarte; Camila Silva	7; 5	6; 1
3	(Brazil) (Chile)	Maria Fernanda Alves / Teliana Pereira; Andrea Koch-Benvenuto / Camila Silva	6; 1	1; 6	2; 6

== Colombia vs. Chile ==
Colombia
3
Tennis Club de Argentino, Buenos Aires, Argentina
February 3, 2011
Clay (outdoors)

Chile
0

			1	2	3
1	(Colombia) (Chile)	Catalina Castaño; Andrea Koch-Benvenuto	6; 4	7^{7} 6^{5}
2	(Colombia) (Chile)	Mariana Duque Mariño; Camila Silva	6; 3	6; 3
3	(Colombia) (Chile)	Karen Castiblanco / Mariana Duque Mariño; Fernanda Brito / Camila Silva	6; 4	6; 4

== Brazil vs. Mexico ==
Brazil
3
Tennis Club de Argentino, Buenos Aires, Argentina
February 3, 2011
Clay (outdoors)

Mexico
0

			1	2	3
1	(Brazil) (Mexico)	Maria-Fernanda Alves; Nazari Urbina	6; 3	6; 3
2	(Brazil) (Mexico)	Ana-Clara Duarte; Ximena Hermoso	6; 0	6; 3
3	(Brazil) (Mexico)	Roxane Vaisemberg / Teliana Pereira; Lalia Abdala / Nadia Abdala	6; 1	6; 1

== Colombia vs. Brazil ==
Colombia
2
Tennis Club de Argentino, Buenos Aires, Argentina
February 4, 2011
Clay (outdoors)

Brazil
1

			1	2	3
1	(Colombia) (Brazil)	Catalina Castaño; Maria-Fernanda Alves	6; 0	7^{7} 6^{5}
2	(Colombia) (Brazil)	Mariana Duque Mariño; Ana-Clara Duarte	4; 6	4; 6
3	(Colombia) (Brazil)	Catalina Castaño / Karen Castiblanco; Ana-Clara Duarte / Roxane Vaisemberg	6; 3	7; 5

== Chile vs. Mexico ==
Chile
2
Tennis Club de Argentino, Buenos Aires, Argentina
February 4, 2011
Clay (outdoors)

Mexico
1

			1	2	3
1	(Chile) (Mexico)	Andrea Koch-Benvenuto; Nazari Urbina	6; 2	6; 3
2	(Chile) (Mexico)	Camila Silva; Ximena Hermoso	6^{6} 7^{8}	4; 6
3	(Chile) (Mexico)	Andrea Koch-Benvenuto / Camila Silva; Lalia Abdala / Nadia Abdala	6; 3	6; 3

== See also ==
- Fed Cup structure
