= Tennis at the 2014 South American Games – Men's singles =

Men's singles
- Tennis at the 2014 South American Games

Final
- Champion: (Argentina) Facundo Bagnis
- Runner-up: (Argentina) Guido Andreozzi
- Score: 4–6, 6–3, 7–6^{(7–3)}

Events
Singles	men	women
Doubles	men	women	mixed
- South American Games

The men's singles tennis tournament at the 2014 South American Games was held from 10 to 16 March on the clay courts of the Estadio Nacional Julio Martínez Prádanos in Ñuñoa, Santiago, Chile. 31 players from 11 countries competed in the main draw, with the first seed given a bye into the second round.

All matches were the best of three sets, with tie-breaks used in every set.

Argentinian Facundo Argüello was the defending champion, but was not eligible by his national delegation.

Argentinian Facundo Bagnis defeated his compatriot Guido Andreozzi 4–6, 6–3, 7–6^{(7–3)} in the final, to claim the second gold medal for Argentina in the tennis competition. Both players have previously competed in men's doubles representing Argentina and claimed the first gold medal for their country by defeating Colombians Nicolás Barrientos and Carlos Salamanca in straight sets.

== Calendar ==
Matches took place between 10 and 16 March 2014.

March
10	11	12	13	14	15	16
10:00	10:00	10:00	10:00	10:00		10:00
Round of 32		Round of 16	Quarterfinals	Semifinals	—	Bronze medal match Gold medal match

== Seeds ==
1. Facundo Bagnis (ARG) (champion, gold medalist)
2. Guido Andreozzi (ARG) (final, silver medalist)
3. Rogério Dutra Silva (BRA) (semifinals, fourth place, withdrew because of a right ankle injury)
4. Paul Capdeville (CHI) (semifinals, bronze medalist)
5. David Souto (VEN) (second round)
6. Carlos Salamanca (COL) (quarterfinals)
7. Emilio Gómez (ECU) (quarterfinals)
8. Gonzalo Lama (CHI) (second round)

== Draw ==
Key

- Q = Qualifier
- WC = Wild card
- LL = Lucky loser
- Alt = Alternate
- ITF = ITF entry
- PR = Protected ranking
- SR = Special ranking
- SE = Special exempt
- JE = Junior exempt
- JR = Junior Accelerator Programme entrant
- CO = College Accelerator Programme entrant
- NG = Next Gen Accelerator Program entrant
- w/o = Walkover
- r = Retired
- d = Defaulted

=== Finals ===
Semifinals
1	Facundo Bagnis (ARG)	7	6^{6}	4
3	Rogério Dutra Silva (BRA)	5	7^{8}	2^{r}
4	Paul Capdeville (CHI)	6	4	0
2	Guido Andreozzi (ARG)	3	6	6

Final (gold-medal match)
1	Facundo Bagnis (ARG)	4	6	7^{7}
2	Guido Andreozzi (ARG)	6	3	6^{3}
Bronze-medal match
3	Rogério Dutra Silva (BRA)
4	Paul Capdeville (CHI)	w/o

=== Top half ===
First round
F de Paula (BRA)	6	6^{1}	6
G Escobar (ECU)	4	7^{7}	1
N Barrientos (COL)	6	4	6
S Galdós (PER)	2	6	4
R Maytín (VEN)	1	6^{4}
8	G Lama (CHI)	6	7^{7}
3	R Dutra Silva (BRA)	6	6
P Cachin (ARG)	2	4
A Mendoza (BOL)	6^{0}	4
G Núñez (CHI)	7^{7}	6
LD Martínez (VEN)	6	6
T Bendter (SUR)	0	2
A Behar (URU)	1	3
6	C Salamanca (COL)	6	6

Second round
1	F Bagnis (ARG)	6	6
F de Paula (BRA)	3	4
N Barrientos (COL)	6	6
8	G Lama (CHI)	0	4
3	R Dutra Silva (BRA)	6	6
G Núñez (CHI)	2	3
LD Martínez (VEN)	4	3
6	C Salamanca (COL)	6	6

Quarterfinals
1	F Bagnis (ARG)	6	6
N Barrientos (COL)	1	1
3	R Dutra Silva (BRA)	6	7^{7}
6	C Salamanca (COL)	2	6^{4}

Semifinals
1	F Bagnis (ARG)	7	6^{6}	4
3	R Dutra Silva (BRA)	5	7^{8}	2^{r}

=== Bottom half ===
First round
7	E Gómez (ECU)	6^{5}	6	6
JÁ Borba (PAR)	7^{7}	1	3
M Echazú (PER)	6	6
G Issa (SUR)	1	3
F Mantilla (COL)	2
R Senattore (URU)	1^{r}
M Dellien (BOL)	2	3
4	P Capdeville (CHI)	6	6
5	D Souto (VEN)	6	6
L Escobar (PAR)	2	0
B Sant'Anna (BRA)	3	4
J Aguilar (CHI)	6	6
D Beretta (PER)	6	6
J Antelo (BOL)	3	1
JC Campozano (ECU)	4	3
2	G Andreozzi (ARG)	6	6

Second round
7	E Gómez (ECU)	6	7^{9}
M Echazú (PER)	1	6^{7}
F Mantilla (COL)	3	1
4	P Capdeville (CHI)	6	6
5	D Souto (VEN)	6	5	4
J Aguilar (CHI)	4	7	6
D Beretta (PER)	6	5	1
2	G Andreozzi (ARG)	3	7	6

Quarterfinals
7	E Gómez (ECU)	2	3
4	P Capdeville (CHI)	6	6
J Aguilar (CHI)	3	4
2	G Andreozzi (ARG)	6	6

Semifinals
4	P Capdeville (CHI)	6	4	0
2	G Andreozzi (ARG)	3	6	6
