= 2011 Fed Cup Americas Zone Group I – Pool A =

Group A of the 2011 Fed Cup Americas Zone Group I was one of two pools in the Asia/Oceania zone of the 2011 Fed Cup. Four teams competed in a round robin competition, with the top team and the bottom two teams proceeding to their respective sections of the play-offs: the top teams played for advancement to the World Group II Play-offs, while the bottom teams faced potential relegation to Group II.

		(Argentina) ARG	(Paraguay) PAR	(Peru) PER	(Bolivia) BOL	RR; W–L	Set; W–L	Game; W–L	Standings
18	Argentina		1–2	3–0	3–0	2–1	15–5	109–69	1
23	Paraguay	2–1		1–2	2–1	2–1	11–11	99–102	3
47	Peru	0–3	2–1		3–0	2–1	11–9	91–90	2
53	Bolivia	0–3	1–2	0–3		0–3	4–16	74–112	4

== Argentina vs. Bolivia ==
Argentina
3
Tennis Club de Argentino, Buenos Aires, Argentina
February 2, 2011
Clay (outdoors)

Bolivia
0

			1	2	3
1	(Argentina) (Bolivia)	Florencia Molinero; María Paula Deheza	6; 4	6; 3
2	(Argentina) (Bolivia)	María Irigoyen; María Fernanda Álvarez Terán	6; 3	6; 0
3	(Argentina) (Bolivia)	Mailen Auroux / Florencia Molinero; María Fernanda Álvarez Terán / María Paula Deheza	7^{7} 6^{5}	6; 1

== Paraguay vs. Peru ==
Paraguay
1
Tennis Club de Argentino, Buenos Aires, Argentina
February 2, 2011
Clay (outdoors)

Peru
2

			1	2	3
1	(Paraguay) (Peru)	Montserrat González; Patricia Kú Flores	2; 6	4; 6
2	(Paraguay) (Peru)	Verónica Cepede Royg; Bianca Botto	4; 6	1; 6
3	(Paraguay) (Peru)	Verónica Cepede Royg / Montserrat González; Bianca Botto / Ximena Siles Luna	3; 6	6; 3	6; 4

== Argentina vs. Paraguay ==
Argentina
1
Tennis Club de Argentino, Buenos Aires, Argentina
February 3, 2011
Clay (outdoors)

Paraguay
2

			1	2	3
1	(Argentina) (Paraguay)	Florencia Molinero; Montserrat González	6^{5} 7^{7}	6; 1	6; 3
2	(Argentina) (Paraguay)	María Irigoyen; Verónica Cepede Royg	4; 6	2; 6
3	(Argentina) (Paraguay)	Gisela Dulko / Florencia Molinero; Verónica Cepede Royg / Montserrat González	0; 6	7^{7} 6^{5}	5; 7

== Peru vs. Bolivia ==
Peru
3
Tennis Club de Argentino, Buenos Aires, Argentina
February 3, 2011
Clay (outdoors)

Bolivia
0

			1	2	3
1	(Peru) (Bolivia)	Patricia Kú Flores; María Paula Deheza	7^{7} 6^{4}	6; 4
2	(Peru) (Bolivia)	Bianca Botto; María Fernanda Álvarez Terán	6; 2	7^{7} 6^{0}
3	(Peru) (Bolivia)	Ximena Siles Luna / Ferny Ángeles Paz; María Paula Deheza / Noelia Zeballos	6^{4} 7^{7}	6; 3	6; 0

== Argentina vs. Peru ==
Argentina
3
Tennis Club de Argentino, Buenos Aires, Argentina
February 4, 2011
Clay (outdoors)

Peru
0

			1	2	3
1	(Argentina) (Peru)	Florencia Molinero; Patricia Kú Flores	6; 2	6; 3
2	(Argentina) (Peru)	Gisela Dulko; Bianca Botto	6; 0	6; 3
3	(Argentina) (Peru)	Gisela Dulko / María Irigoyen; Bianca Botto / Ximena Siles Luna	6; 0	6; 2

== Paraguay vs. Bolivia ==
Paraguay
2
Tennis Club de Argentino, Buenos Aires, Argentina
February 4, 2011
Clay (outdoors)

Bolivia
1

			1	2	3
1	(Paraguay) (Bolivia)	Montserrat González; María Paula Deheza	6; 4	6; 1
2	(Paraguay) (Bolivia)	Verónica Cepede Royg; María Fernanda Álvarez Terán	2; 6	1; 6
3	(Paraguay) (Bolivia)	Verónica Cepede Royg / Montserrat González; María Fernanda Álvarez Terán / María Paula Deheza	4; 6	6; 3	6; 3

== See also ==
- Fed Cup structure
