= Tennis at the 2014 South American Games – Mixed doubles =

Mixed doubles
- Tennis at the 2014 South American Games

Final
- Champions: (Venezuela) Adriana Pérez (Venezuela) David Souto
- Runners-up: (Chile) Camila Silva (Chile) Nicolás Jarry
- Score: 7–5, 7–5

Events
Singles	men	women
Doubles	men	women	mixed
← 2010 ·	South American Games	· 2018 →

The mixed doubles tennis tournament at the 2014 South American Games in Santiago was held from 12 to 15 March on the clay courts of the Estadio Nacional Julio Martínez Prádanos in Ñuñoa.

Tie-breaks were used for the first two sets of each match, which was the best of three sets. If the score was tied at one set all, a 'super tie-break' (the first pairing to win at least 10 points by a margin of two points) would be used.

Venezuelans Adriana Pérez and David Souto defeated Chileans Camila Silva and Nicolás Jarry 7–5, 7–5 in the final to claim the second gold medal for Venezuela in the tennis competition.

== Calendar ==
Matches took place between 12 and 15 March.

March
12	13	14	15
10:00	10:00	10:00	10:00
Round of 16	Quarterfinals	Semifinals	Bronze medal match Gold medal match

== Seeds ==
1. Adriana Pérez (VEN) / David Souto (VEN) (champions, gold medalists)
2. Gabriela Cé (BRA) / Bruno Sant'Anna (BRA) (semifinals, fourth place, withdrew due to a high fever for Sant'Anna)
3. Camila Silva (CHI) / Nicolás Jarry (CHI) (final, silver medalists)
4. Andrea Koch Benvenuto (CHI) / Jorge Aguilar (CHI) (semifinals, bronze medalists)

== Results ==
=== Key ===
- Q = Qualifier
- WC = Wild card
- LL = Lucky loser
- Alt = Alternate
- ITF = ITF entry
- PR = Protected ranking
- SR = Special ranking
- SE = Special exempt
- JE = Junior exempt
- JR = Junior Accelerator Programme entrant
- CO = College Accelerator Programme entrant
- NG = Next Gen Accelerator Program entrant
- w/o = Walkover
- r = Retired
- d = Defaulted

=== Draw ===
First round
R Gómez (ECU); E Gómez (ECU)	6^{11}	7^{12}	[10]
D Ruiz (BOL); J Mendoza (BOL)	7^{13}	6^{10}	[8]
B Botto (PER); M Echazú (PER)	6	6
S Giménez (PAR); JA Borba (PAR)	2	0

Quarterfinals
1	A Pérez (VEN); D Souto (VEN)	2	7	[10]
S Blanco (ARG); P Cachin (ARG)	6	5	[5]
4	A Koch (CHI); J Aguilar (CHI)	6	6
R Gómez (ECU); E Gómez (ECU)	4	2
B Botto (PER); M Echazú (PER)	6	3	[8]
3	C Silva (CHI); N Jarry (CHI)	2	6	[10]
P Pérez (COL); F Mantilla (COL)	4	4
2	G Cé (BRA); B Sant'Anna (BRA)	6	6

Semifinals
1	A Pérez (VEN); D Souto (VEN)	6	6
4	A Koch (CHI); J Aguilar (CHI)	2	1
3	C Silva (CHI); N Jarry (CHI)	5	7^{7}	[10]
2	G Cé (BRA); B Sant'Anna (BRA)	7	6^{5}	[7]

Final (gold-medal match)
1	A Pérez (VEN); D Souto (VEN)	7	7
3	C Silva (CHI); N Jarry (CHI)	5	5
Bronze-medal match
4	A Koch (CHI); J Aguilar (CHI)	w/o
2	G Cé (BRA); B Sant'Anna (BRA)
