= Tennis at the 2014 South American Games – Women's singles =

Women's singles
- Tennis at the 2014 South American Games

Final
- Champion: (Brazil) Paula Cristina Gonçalves
- Runner-up: (Paraguay) Verónica Cepede Royg
- Score: 6–1, 4–6, 6–4

Events
Singles	men	women
Doubles	men	women	mixed
- South American Games

The women's singles tennis tournament at the 2014 South American Games in Santiago was held from 10 to 16 March on the clay courts of the Estadio Nacional Julio Martínez Prádanos in Ñuñoa.

All matches were the best of three sets, with tie-breaks used in every set.

Chilean Cecilia Costa was the defending champion, but lost in second round to Paraguayan Montserrat González.

Brazilian Paula Cristina Gonçalves defeated Paraguayan Verónica Cepede Royg 6–1, 4–6, 6–4 in the final to claim the only gold medal for Brazil in the tennis competition.

== Calendar ==
Matches took place between 10 and 16 March 2014.

March
10	11	12	13	14	15	16
10:00	10:00	10:00	10:00	10:00		10:00
Round of 32		Round of 16	Quarterfinals	Semifinals	—	Bronze medal match Gold medal match

== Seeds ==
1. Verónica Cepede Royg (PAR) (final; silver medalist)
2. Montserrat González (PAR) (quarterfinals)
3. Laura Pigossi (BRA) (quarterfinals)
4. Daniela Seguel (CHI) (quarterfinals)
5. Gabriela Cé (BRA) (second round)
6. Paula Cristina Gonçalves (BRA) (champion; gold medalist)
7. Andrea Gámiz (VEN) (semifinals, fourth place)
8. Andrea Koch Benvenuto (CHI) (quarterfinals)

== Draw ==
Key

- Q = Qualifier
- WC = Wild card
- LL = Lucky loser
- Alt = Alternate
- ITF = ITF entry
- PR = Protected ranking
- SR = Special ranking
- SE = Special exempt
- JE = Junior exempt
- JR = Junior Accelerator Programme entrant
- CO = College Accelerator Programme entrant
- NG = Next Gen Accelerator Program entrant
- w/o = Walkover
- r = Retired
- d = Defaulted

=== Finals ===
Semifinals
1	Verónica Cepede Royg (PAR)	6	6
7	Andrea Gámiz (VEN)	2	3
6	Paula Cristina Gonçalves (BRA)	6	6
Bianca Botto (PER)	3	3

Final (gold-medal match)
1	Verónica Cepede Royg (PAR)	1	6	4
6	Paula Cristina Gonçalves (BRA)	6	4	6
Bronze medal match
7	Andrea Gámiz (VEN)	6	5	2
Bianca Botto (PER)	3	7	6

=== Top half ===
First round
A Uzcátegui (VEN)	6	5	6
N Zeballos (BOL)	3	7	3
C de los Santos (URU)	6	6^{5}	7^{7}
M Demichelli (PER)	3	7^{7}	6^{2}
N Podoroska (ARG)	2	7^{9}	6^{6}
8	A Koch (CHI)	6	6^{7}	7^{8}
S Giménez (PAR)	0	1
S Blanco (ARG)	6	6
MP Pérez (COL)	2	6	6
R Gómez (ECU)	6	3	3
F Brito (CHI)	2	5
7	A Gámiz (VEN)	6	7

Second round
1	V Cepede Royg (PAR)	6	6
A Uzcátegui (VEN)	0	3
C de los Santos (URU)	2	5
8	A Koch (CHI)	6	7
3	L Pigossi (BRA)	2	6	7
S Blanco (ARG)	6	4	5
MP Pérez (COL)	1	3
7	A Gámiz (VEN)	6	6

Quarterfinals
1	V Cepede Royg (PAR)	6	6
8	A Koch (CHI)	0	1
3	L Pigossi (BRA)	3	5
7	A Gámiz (VEN)	6	7

Semifinals
1	V Cepede Royg (PAR)	6	6
7	A Gámiz (VEN)	2	3

=== Bottom half ===
First round
6	PC Gonçalves (BRA)	6	6
V Bosio (ARG)	1	1
M Boado (URU)	1	1
P Kú Flores (PER)	6	6
L Paredes (ECU)	6	6
D Ruiz (BOL)	2	2
M Herazo (COL)	1	0
4	D Seguel (CHI)	6	6
5	G Cé (BRA)	6	6
I Boada (BOL)	1	0
B Botto (PER)	6	6
PA Pérez (COL)	0	1
AC Pérez (ECU)	2	3
C Costa (CHI)	6	6

Second round
6	PC Gonçalves (BRA)	4	6	6
P Kú Flores (PER)	6	0	2
L Paredes (ECU)	0	2
4	D Seguel (CHI)	6	6
5	G Cé (BRA)	6	2	1
B Botto (PER)	1	6	6
C Costa (CHI)	4	4
2	M González (PAR)	6	6

Quarterfinals
6	PC Gonçalves (BRA)	3	7^{8}	6
4	D Seguel (CHI)	6	6^{6}	0
B Botto (PER)	2	7^{7}	6
2	M González (PAR)	6	6^{5}	4

Semifinals
6	PC Gonçalves (BRA)	6	6
B Botto (PER)	3	3
