= 2011 Abierto Mexicano Telcel – Women's singles qualifying =

This article displays the qualifying draw of the 2011 Abierto Mexicano Telcel.

== Players ==
=== Seeds ===
1. (Georgia (country)) Anna Tatishvili (qualifier)
2. (Ukraine) Lesia Tsurenko (qualifier)
3. (France) Olivia Sanchez (first round)
4. (United States) Irina Falconi (first round)
5. (China) Han Xinyun (first round)
6. (Luxembourg) Mandy Minella (first round)
7. (Czech Republic) Petra Cetkovská (qualifying competition)
8. (Romania) Irina-Camelia Begu (qualifying competition)

=== Qualifiers ===
1. (Georgia (country)) Anna Tatishvili
2. (Ukraine) Lesia Tsurenko
3. (Spain) Silvia Soler Espinosa
4. (Romania) Mădălina Gojnea

== Qualifying draw ==
=== First qualifier ===
First round
1 | (Georgia (country)) Anna Tatishvili | 7 | 4 | 6
(Greece) Eleni Daniilidou | 6^{5} | 6 | 2
WC | (Mexico) Giovanna Manifacio | 2 | 0
(Ukraine) Olga Savchuk | 6 | 6
WC | (Mexico) Nadia Abdalá | 3 | 1
WC | (Spain) María-Teresa Torró-Flor | 6 | 6
(Russia) Arina Rodionova | 7 | 1 | 1
7 | (Czech Republic) Petra Cetkovská | 5 | 6 | 6

Second round
1 | (Georgia (country)) Anna Tatishvili | 2 | 6 | 6
(Ukraine) Olga Savchuk | 6 | 4 | 3
WC | (Spain) María-Teresa Torró-Flor | 3 | 2
7 | (Czech Republic) Petra Cetkovská | 6 | 6

Qualifying competition
1 | (Georgia (country)) Anna Tatishvili | 4 | 6 | 6
7 | (Czech Republic) Petra Cetkovská | 6 | 3 | 4

=== Second qualifier ===
First round
2 | (Ukraine) Lesia Tsurenko | 6 | 4 | 7
(Russia) Alexandra Panova | 4 | 6 | 5
(Ukraine) Mariya Koryttseva | 2 | 2
(Slovenia) Maša Zec Peškirič | 6 | 6
(Germany) Kathrin Wörle | 2 | 6 | 5
(Argentina) María Irigoyen | 6 | 3 | 7
(United States) Julia Cohen | 6 | 4 | 2
8 | (Romania) Irina-Camelia Begu | 4 | 6 | 6

Second round
2 | (Ukraine) Lesia Tsurenko | 6 | 6
(Slovenia) Maša Zec Peškirič | 3 | 2
(Argentina) María Irigoyen | 3 | 4
8 | (Romania) Irina-Camelia Begu | 6 | 6

Qualifying competition
2 | (Ukraine) Lesia Tsurenko | 6 | 6
8 | (Romania) Irina-Camelia Begu | 3 | 4

=== Third qualifier ===
First round
3 | (France) Olivia Sanchez | 2 | 1
(Spain) Silvia Soler Espinosa | 6 | 6
(France) Laura Thorpe | 1 | 2
(Australia) Sally Peers | 6 | 6
WC | (Mexico) Carolina Betancourt | 2 | 1
(Czech Republic) Eva Birnerová | 6 | 6
(Italy) Corinna Dentoni | 6 | 6
6 | (Luxembourg) Mandy Minella | 4 | 4

Second round
(Spain) Silvia Soler Espinosa | 6 | 6
(Australia) Sally Peers | 4 | 2
(Czech Republic) Eva Birnerová | 6 | 2 | 1
(Italy) Corinna Dentoni | 4 | 6 | 6

Qualifying competition
(Spain) Silvia Soler Espinosa | 6 | 6
(Italy) Corinna Dentoni | 1 | 3

=== Fourth qualifier ===
First round
4 | (United States) Irina Falconi | 6^{1} | 4
(Spain) Beatriz García Vidagany | 7 | 6
(France) Stéphanie Foretz Gacon | 6 | 6
(Colombia) Mariana Duque | 4 | 3
(Romania) Ioana Raluca Olaru | 7 | 6
(Germany) Anna-Lena Grönefeld | 5 | 3
(Romania) Mădălina Gojnea | 6 | 6
5 | (China) Han Xinyun | 3 | 0

Second round
(Spain) Beatriz García Vidagany | 6 | 4 | 4
(France) Stéphanie Foretz Gacon | 2 | 6 | 6
(Romania) Ioana Raluca Olaru | 3 | 3
(Romania) Mădălina Gojnea | 6 | 6

Qualifying competition
(France) Stéphanie Foretz Gacon | 1 | 2
(Romania) Mădălina Gojnea | 6 | 6
