= Tennis at the 2014 South American Games – Men's doubles =

Men's doubles
- Tennis at the 2014 South American Games

Final
- Champions: (Argentina) Guido Andreozzi (Argentina) Facundo Bagnis
- Runners-up: (Colombia) Nicolás Barrientos (Colombia) Carlos Salamanca
- Score: 7–6^{(7–5)}, 7–5

Events
Singles	men	women
Doubles	men	women	mixed
- South American Games

The men's doubles tennis tournament at the 2014 South American Games in Santiago was held from 12 to 15 March on the clay courts of the Estadio Nacional Julio Martínez Prádanos in Ñuñoa.

Tie-breaks were used for the first two sets of each match, which was the best of three sets. If the score was tied at one set all, a 'super tie-break' (the first pairing to win at least 10 points by a margin of two points) would be used.

Ecuatorians Diego Cañizares and Roberto Andrés Gómez were the defending champions, but were not eligible by their national delegation. Julio César Campozano and Gonzalo Escobar represented Ecuador in this edition, but lost in Quarterfinals to Colombians Nicolás Barrientos and Carlos Salamanca.

Argentinians Guido Andreozzi and Facundo Bagnis defeated Colombians Nicolás Barrientos and Carlos Salamanca 7–6^{(7–5)}, 7–5 in the final to claim the first gold medal for Argentina in the tennis competition. Both players competed against each other in the singles final, where Bagnis defeated Andreozzi in three sets, claiming the second gold medal for his country.

== Calendar ==
Matches took place between 12 and 15 March.

March
12	13	14	15
10:00	10:00	10:00	10:00
Round of 16	Quarterfinals	Semifinals	Bronze medal match Gold medal match

== Seeds ==
1. Guido Andreozzi (ARG) / Facundo Bagnis (ARG) (champions, gold medalists)
2. Nicolás Barrientos (COL) / Carlos Salamanca (COL) (final, silver medalists)
3. Duilio Beretta (PER) / Sergio Galdós (PER) (quarterfinals)
4. Luis David Martínez (VEN) / Roberto Maytín (VEN) (semifinals, fourth place)

== Results ==
Key

- Q = Qualifier
- WC = Wild card
- LL = Lucky loser
- Alt = Alternate
- ITF = ITF entry
- PR = Protected ranking
- SR = Special ranking
- SE = Special exempt
- JE = Junior exempt
- JR = Junior Accelerator Programme entrant
- CO = College Accelerator Programme entrant
- NG = Next Gen Accelerator Program entrant
- w/o = Walkover
- r = Retired
- d = Defaulted

=== Draw ===
First round
N Jarry (CHI); G Núñez (CHI)	6	7^{7}
F de Paula (BRA); R Dutra Silva (BRA)	1	6^{4}
A Behar (URU); R Senattore (URU)
T Bendter (SUR); G Issa (SUR)	w/o
JC Campozano (ECU); G Escobar (ECU)	6	6
JM Antelo (BOL); M Dellien (BOL)	2	2

Quarterfinals
1	G Andreozzi (ARG); F Bagnis (ARG)	6	6
N Jarry (CHI); G Núñez (CHI)	3	4
4	LD Martínez (VEN); R Maytín (VEN)	6	6
T Bendter (SUR); G Issa (SUR)	1	1
P Capdeville (CHI); G Lama (CHI)	6	6
3	D Beretta (PER); S Galdós (PER)	2	1
JC Campozano (ECU); G Escobar (ECU)	3	6	[11]
2	N Barrientos (COL); C Salamanca (COL)	6	2	[13]

Semifinals
1	G Andreozzi (ARG); F Bagnis (ARG)	6	6
4	LD Martínez (VEN); R Maytín (VEN)	1	1
P Capdeville (CHI); G Lama (CHI)	4	1
2	N Barrientos (COL); C Salamanca (COL)	6	6

Final (gold-medal match)
1	G Andreozzi (ARG); F Bagnis (ARG)	7^{7}	7
2	N Barrientos (COL); C Salamanca (COL)	6^{5}	5

==== Bronze-medal match ====
Bronze-medal match
4	LD Martínez (VEN); R Maytín (VEN)	6	2	[6]
	P Capdeville (CHI); G Lama (CHI)	4	6	[10]
