= Paraguay at the South American Games =

- Flag of Paraguay
- IOC code: PAR
- NOC: Paraguayan Olympic Committee
- Medals Ranked 10th: Gold 27 Silver 70 Bronze 75 Total 172

South American Games appearances (overview)
- 1978; 1982; 1986; 1990; 1994; 1998; 2002; 2006; 2010; 2014; 2018; 2022

Paraguay was one of the founding members of the South American Games participating in the very first edition held in La Paz, Bolivia in 1978.

Paraguay is represented by the Paraguayan Olympic Committee and have host this event once in 2022 in the city of Asunción.

== Medal count ==
=== Medals by Games ===
Red border colour indicates host nation status.

Games	Gold	Silver	Bronze	Total	Rank
(Bolivia) 1978 La Paz	2	3	4	9	7th
(Argentina) 1982 Rosario	0	3	3	6	10th
(Chile) 1986 Santiago	1	6	8	15	8th
(Peru) 1990 Lima	0	4	2	6	10th
(Venezuela) 1994 Valencia	3	0	7	10	10th
(Ecuador) 1998 Cuenca	1	1	4	6	12th
2002 Brazil	0	1	8	9	10th
(Argentina) 2006 Buenos Aires	2	4	5	11	9th
(Colombia) 2010 Medellin	1	7	4	12	10th
(Chile) 2014 Santiago	3	5	2	10	9th
(Bolivia) 2018 Cochabamba	6	10	14	30	8th
(Paraguay) 2022 Asunción	8	26	14	48	8th
(Argentina) 2026 Santa Fe
Total	27	70	75	172	10th
