= Paul Capdeville =

Chilean tennis player

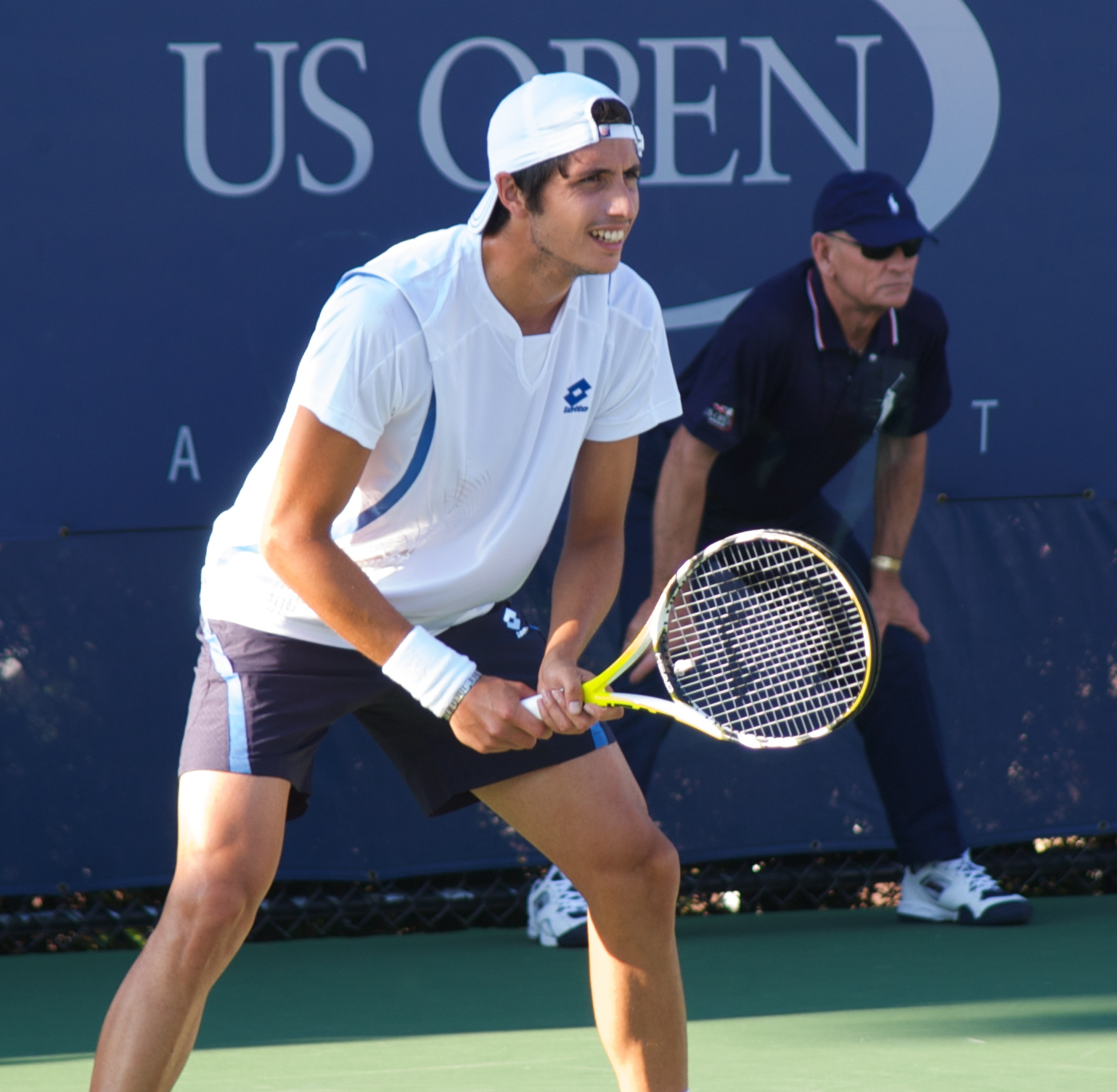
- Country (sports): Chile
- Residence: Vitacura, Chile
- Born: 2 April 1983 (age 43) Santiago, Chile
- Height: 1.90 m (6 ft 3 in)
- Turned pro: 2002
- Retired: 2014
- Plays: Right-handed (two-handed backhand)
- Prize money: $1,097,506

Singles
- Career record: 48–79 (at ATP Tour level, Grand Slam level and in Davis Cup)
- Career titles: 0
- Highest ranking: No. 76 (18 May 2009)

Grand Slam singles results
- Australian Open: 2R (2007, 2008)
- French Open: 2R (2006, 2008)
- Wimbledon: 1R (2009)
- US Open: 2R (2005, 2007, 2009)

Doubles
- Career record: 14–22 (at ATP Tour level, Grand Slam level and in Davis Cup)
- Career titles: 1
- Highest ranking: No. 147 (23 July 2007)

Grand Slam doubles results
- French Open: 1R (2008)
- Wimbledon: Q1 (2007)
Medal record
Representing Chile
Men's tennis
South American Games
Bronze medal – third place	2014 Santiago	Men's singles
Bronze medal – third place	2014 Santiago	Men's doubles
- Last updated on: 18 February 2013.

Paul Gerard Capdeville Castro (Spanish pronunciation: [ˈpol kaβðeˈβil]; born 2 April 1983) is a Chilean former tennis player. He was born in Santiago.

== Tennis career ==
In May 2009, he achieved a career-high singles ranking of World No. 76.

At the 2006 French Open, Capdeville had a shoving incident with Mario Ančić, at the end of his second round match. The two players had to be separated by the chair umpire. Ančić and Capdeville were each fined US$3,000 for the incident.

Capdeville's best showing at an ATP event to date came at the 2009 Estoril Open, where he reached the semifinals. Other notable results include the quarterfinals at Memphis (2006), Washington (2007), Indianapolis (2008) and Viña del Mar (2009).

Capdeville has won ten challenger tournaments: Bogotá (2005), Florianópolis (2007), Binghamton and Aracajú (2008), Binghamton (2009), Guayaquil (2010), Guadalajara (2011), Binghamton (2011), Santiago (2012), and São Paulo (2013).

Capdeville was part of the Chilean Davis Cup team. In his first competitive match, he beat Austria's Stefan Koubek in five sets.

Capdeville announced his retirement after playing at a Davis Cup tie against Paraguay in 2014.

== All Finals ==
=== Singles finals ===
Legend (singles)
Challengers (10–10)
Futures (0)

Outcome	No.	Date	Tournament	Surface	Opponent	Score
Winner	1.	18 April 2005	Bogotá, Colombia	Clay	(Colombia) Pablo González	6–3, 6–4
Runner-up	1.	30 April 2005	Sassuolo, Italy	Clay	(Austria) Oliver Marach	3–6, 6–4, 4–6
Runner-up	2.	23 January 2006	Santiago, Chile	Clay	(Serbia) Boris Pašanski	2–6, 6–7^{(7–9)}
Runner-up	3.	14 August 2006	Bronx, New York, USA	Hard	(United States) Michael Russell	0–6, 2–6
Winner	2.	23 April 2007	Florianópolis, Brazil	Clay	(Argentina) Juan Pablo Guzmán	7–6^{(7–0)}, 6–0
Winner	3.	4 August 2008	Binghamton, USA	Hard	(United States) Rajeev Ram	4–6, 6–3, 6–1
Winner	4.	29 September 2008	Aracaju, Brazil	Clay	(Brazil) Thiago Alves	7–5, 6–4
Runner-up	4.	27 October 2008	Cali-2, Colombia	Clay	(Austria) Daniel Köllerer	4–6, 3–6
Runner-up	5.	5 January 2009	São Paulo-1, Brazil	Hard	(Brazil) Ricardo Mello	2–6, 4–6
Winner	5.	16 August 2009	Binghamton, USA	Hard	(South Africa) Kevin Anderson	7–6^{(9–7)}, 7–6^{(13–11)}
Runner-up	6.	18 October 2010	Santiago-2, Chile	Clay	(Italy) Fabio Fognini	2–6, 6–7^{(2–7)}
Winner	6.	14 November 2010	Guayaquil, Ecuador	Clay	(Argentina) Diego Junqueira	6–3, 3–6, 6–3
Winner	7.	26 June 2011	Guadalajara, Mexico	Hard	(Canada) Pierre-Ludovic Duclos	7–5, 6–1
Winner	8.	14 August 2011	Binghamton, USA	Hard	(United States) Wayne Odesnik	7–6^{(7–4)}, 6–3
Winner	9.	11 March 2012	Santiago, Chile	Clay	(Croatia) Antonio Veić	6–3, 6–7^{(5–7)}, 6–3
Runner-up	7.	9 April 2012	Blumenau, Brazil	Clay	(Croatia) Antonio Veić	6–3, 4–6, 2–5 ret.
Runner-up	8.	7 May 2012	Rio Quente, Brazil	Hard	(Brazil) Guilherme Clezar	6–7^{(4–7)}, 3–6
Runner-up	9.	5 November 2012	São Leopoldo, Brazil	Clay	(Argentina) Horacio Zeballos	6–3, 5–7, 6–7^{(2–7)}
Runner-up	10.	25 March 2013	Pereira, Colombia	Clay	(Colombia) Santiago Giraldo	2–6, 4–6
Winner	10.	22 April 2013	São Paulo, Brazil	Clay	(Argentina) Renzo Olivo	6–2, 6–2

=== Doubles wins ===
No.	Date	Tournament	Surface	Partnering	Opponents	Score
1.	29 January 2007	Viña del Mar, Chile	Clay	(Spain) Óscar Hernández	(Spain) Albert Montañés (Spain) Rubén Ramírez Hidalgo	4–6, 6–4, [10–6]
2.	6 November 2011	Medellín, Colombia	Clay	(Chile) Nicolás Massú	(Italy) Alessio di Mauro (Italy) Matteo Viola	6–2, 4–6, [10–8]
3.	10 March 2012	Providencia, Chile	Clay	(Uruguay) Marcel Felder	(Chile) Jorge Aguilar (Mexico) Daniel Garza	6–7^{(3–7)}, 6–4, [10–7]
4.	28 April 2012	São Paulo, Brazil	Clay	(Uruguay) Marcel Felder	(Brazil) André Ghem (Brazil) João Pedro Sorgi	7–5, 6–3

== Performance timeline ==
Key
W	F	SF	QF	#R	RR	Q#	DNQ	A	NH

(W) winner; (F) finalist; (SF) semifinalist; (QF) quarterfinalist; (#R) rounds 4, 3, 2, 1; (RR) round-robin stage; (Q#) qualification round; (DNQ) did not qualify; (A) absent; (NH) not held; (SR) strike rate (events won / competed); (W–L) win–loss record.

Tournament	2005	2006	2007	2008	2009	2010	2011	2012	2013	2014	SR	W–L
Australian Open	A	A	2R	2R	Q1	Q1	Q2	A	Q3	Q2	0 / 2	2–2
French Open	Q2	2R	1R	2R	1R	Q1	Q2	Q1	Q2	A	0 / 4	2–4
Wimbledon	Q1	Q1	Q3	Q2	1R	A	A	A	Q2	A	0 / 1	0–1
US Open	2R	Q2	2R	1R	2R	Q1	Q3	Q2	A	A	0 / 4	3–4
Win–loss	1–1	1–1	2–3	2–3	1–3	0–0	0–0	0–0	0–0	0–0	0 / 11	7–11
ATP Masters Series
Indian Wells Masters	A	1R	1R	1R	Q2	A	A	A	A	A	0 / 3	0–3
Miami Masters	A	1R	Q2	Q2	Q2	Q1	1R	Q2	Q2	A	0 / 2	0–2
Monte-Carlo Masters	A	A	A	A	A	A	A	A	A	A	0 / 0	0–0
Rome Masters	A	A	A	A	Q1	A	A	A	A	A	0 / 0	0–0
Stuttgart/Madrid Masters	A	A	A	A	Q1	A	A	A	A	A	0 / 0	0–0
Canada Masters	A	A	A	A	A	A	A	Q1	A	A	0 / 0	0–0
Cincinnati Masters	A	A	A	1R	A	A	A	A	A	A	0 / 1	0–1
Shanghai Masters	Not Held				A	A	Q1	A	A	A	0 / 0	0–0
Paris Masters	A	A	A	A	A	A	A	A	A	A	0 / 0	0–0
Hamburg Masters	A	A	A	A	NM1000						0 / 0	0–0
Win–loss	0–0	0–2	0–1	0–2	0–0	0–0	0–1	0–0	0–0	0–0	0 / 6	0–6
Year-end ranking	133	142	100	112	129	165	131	166	154	916		

== Top 10 wins ==
#	Player	Rank	Event	Surface	Rd	Score	Capdeville Rank
2006
1.	(United States) James Blake	8	Davis Cup, Rancho Mirage	Grass	RR	6–3, 6–4	103
