= Adriana Pérez =

Venezuelan tennis player

- Country (sports): Venezuela
- Born: 20 November 1992 (age 33) Anzoátegui, Venezuela
- Height: 1.63 m (5 ft 4 in)
- Plays: Right (two-handed backhand)
- Prize money: $80,306

Singles
- Career record: 127–83
- Career titles: 7 ITF
- Highest ranking: No. 186 (14 April 2014)

Grand Slam singles results
- US Open: Q1 (2013)

Doubles
- Career record: 89–63
- Career titles: 9 ITF
- Highest ranking: No. 152 (26 August 2013)
Medal record
Representing Venezuela
Women's tennis
South American Games
Gold medal – first place	2014 Santiago	Doubles
Gold medal – first place	2014 Santiago	Mixed doubles
Silver medal – second place	2010 Medellín	Doubles
Central American and Caribbean Games
Silver medal – second place	2014 Veracruz	Doubles
Silver medal – second place	2014 Veracruz	Team event
Silver medal – second place	2014 Veracruz	Mixed doubles

Adriana Pérez (Latin American Spanish: [aˈðɾjana ˈpeɾes]; born November 20, 1992) is a Venezuelan former professional tennis player and member of the Venezuela Fed Cup team.

In her career, Pérez won seven singles titles and nine doubles titles on the ITF Women's Circuit. In April 2014, she reached her highest singles ranking by the WTA of 186, whilst her best WTA doubles ranking was 152, achieved in August 2013.

Competing for Venezuela in Fed Cup, Pérez scored a win–loss record of 16–16.

== ITF Circuit finals ==
Legend
$50,000 tournaments
$25,000 tournaments
$10,000 tournaments

=== Singles (7–4) ===
Result	No.	Date	Tournament	Surface	Opponent	Score
Win	1.	18 September 2010	ITF Caracas, Venezuela	Hard	(Venezuela) Andrea Gámiz	6–3, 6–1
Loss	2.	25 September 2010	ITF Caracas, Venezuela	Hard	(Venezuela) Andrea Gámiz	6–1, 4–6, 5–7
Win	3.	30 October 2010	ITF Bogotá, Colombia	Clay	(Colombia) Karen Castiblanco	6–1, 1–6, 6–1
Win	4.	9 April 2011	ITF Caracas, Venezuela	Hard	(Belarus) Viktoryia Kisialeva	6–1, 6–3
Win	5.	16 April 2011	ITF Caracas, Venezuela	Hard	(United States) Amanda McDowell	2–6, 6–2, 6–2
Loss	6.	31 July 2011	ITF Campos do Jordão, Brazil	Hard	(Paraguay) Verónica Cepede Royg	6–7^{(4)}, 5–7
Win	7.	28 April 2012	ITF Caracas, Venezuela	Hard	(Brazil) Teliana Pereira	6–1, 6–1
Loss	8.	4 May 2013	ITF Caracas, Venezuela	Hard	(Slovenia) Tadeja Majerič	6–1, 3–6, 5–7
Win	9.	15 September 2013	ITF Redding, United States	Hard	(United States) Robin Anderson	2–6, 6–2, 6–1
Loss	10.	1 December 2013	ITF Monterrey, Mexico	Hard	(Netherlands) Indy de Vroome	4–6, 6–4, 6–3
Win	11.	14 December 2013	ITF Mérida, Mexico	Hard	(Sweden) Rebecca Peterson	4–6, 0–6

=== Doubles (9–5) ===
Result	No.	Date	Tournament	Surface	Partner	Opponents	Score
Loss	1.	17 September 2010	ITF Caracas, Venezuela	Hard	(Venezuela) Andrea Gámiz	(Belgium) Gally De Wael (Austria) Nicole Rottmann	2–6, 6–1, [4–10]
Win	2.	5 November 2010	ITF Bogotá, Colombia	Clay	(Colombia) Yuliana Lizarazo	(Colombia) Karen Castiblanco (Chile) Andrea Koch Benvenuto	6–2, 7–6^{(5)}
Win	3.	8 April 2011	ITF Caracas, Venezuela	Hard	(Colombia) Karen Castiblanco	(Croatia) Indire Akiki (Czech Republic) Zuzana Linhová	7–5, 6–2
Win	4.	15 April 2011	ITF Caracas, Venezuela	Hard	(Colombia) Karen Castiblanco	(United States) Lena Litvak (United States) Amanda McDowell	7–6^{(10)}, 6–4
Win	5.	3 June 2011	ITF Maribor, Slovenia	Clay	(Colombia) Karen Castiblanco	(Croatia) Ani Mijacika (Croatia) Ana Vrljić	6–3, 7–6^{(9)}
Win	6.	16 July 2011	ITF Bogotá, Colombia	Clay	(Venezuela) Andrea Gámiz	(United States) Julia Cohen (Chile) Andrea Koch Benvenuto	6–3, 6–4
Loss	7.	27 April 2012	ITF Caracas, Venezuela	Hard	(Paraguay) Verónica Cepede Royg	(Argentina) Mailen Auroux (Argentina) María Irigoyen	4–6, 3–6
Loss	8.	4 November 2012	John Newcombe Challenge, United States	Hard	(Colombia) Mariana Duque Mariño	(Russia) Elena Bovina (Croatia) Mirjana Lučić-Baroni	3–6, 6–4, [8–10]
Loss	9.	12 January 2013	ITF Innisbrook, United States	Clay	(Argentina) Florencia Molinero	(United States) Hsu Chieh-yu (Norway) Ulrikke Eikeri	3–6, 0–6
Loss	10.	20 January 2013	ITF Port St. Lucie, United States	Clay	(Argentina) Florencia Molinero	(United States) Allie Will (Russia) Angelina Gabueva	6–4, 2–6, [7–10]
Win	11.	2 June 2013	ITF El Paso, United States	Hard	(Mexico) Marcela Zacarías	(Oman) Fatma Al-Nabhani (United States) Keri Wong	6–3, 6–3
Win	12.	6 July 2013	ITF São José do Rio Preto, Brazil	Clay	(Paraguay) Verónica Cepede Royg	(Argentina) Mailen Auroux (Bolivia) María Fernanda Álvarez Terán	4–6, 6–4, [11–9]
Win	13.	14 July 2013	ITF Campinas, Brazil	Clay	(Paraguay) Verónica Cepede Royg	(Argentina) Florencia Molinero (Argentina) Carolina Zeballos	6–0, 6–1
Win	14.	1 November 2013	ITF Caracas, Venezuela	Hard	(Paraguay) Verónica Cepede Royg	(Argentina) Florencia Molinero (Brazil) Laura Pigossi	6–3, 6–3
