= Nazari Urbina =

Mexican tennis player (born 1989)

- Full name: Nazari Urbina Tejada
- Country (sports): Mexico
- Residence: Acapulco, Mexico
- Born: 12 June 1989 (age 35); Xalapa, Mexico
- Height: 1.60 m (5 ft 3 in)
- Plays: Right (two-handed backhand)
- Prize money: $20,350

Singles
- Career record: 58–70
- Career titles: 1 ITF
- Highest ranking: No. 601 (23 November 2015)

Doubles
- Career record: 28–46
- Career titles: 1 ITF
- Highest ranking: No. 639 (6 March 2017)

Team competitions
- Fed Cup: 0–4

Nazari Urbina Tejada (born 12 June 1989) is a Mexican former professional tennis player.

She has career-high WTA rankings of 601 in singles and 639 in doubles. Urbina won one singles title and one doubles title on the ITF Women's Circuit.

She has represented Mexico in Fed Cup competition and scored a win–loss record of 0–4.

== ITF finals ==
Legend
$25,000 tournaments
$15,000 tournaments
$10,000 tournaments

=== Singles (1–2) ===
Result	No.	Date	Tournament	Surface	Opponent	Score
Win	1.	26 September 2010	ITF Mazatlán, Mexico	Hard	(United States) Yasmin Schnack	6–4, 6–3
Loss	2.	15 June 2015	ITF Manzanillo, Mexico	Hard	(Chile) Daniela Seguel	6–3, 4–6, 4–6
Loss	3.	22 June 2015	ITF Manzanillo, Mexico	Hard	(Mexico) Giuliana Olmos	7–5, 2–6, 5–7

=== Doubles (1–2) ===
Result	No.	Date	Tournament	Surface	Partner	Opponents	Score
Loss	1.	2 April 2016	ITF León, Mexico	Hard	(Mexico) Sabastiani León	(South Africa) Chanel Simmonds (Mexico) Renata Zarazúa	0–6, 2–6
Loss	2.	2 October 2016	ITF Stillwater, United States	Hard	(Mexico) Giuliana Olmos	(United States) Ronit Yurovsky (United States) Emina Bektas	4–6, 7–6^{(6)}, [6–10]
Win	1.	15 June 2019	ITF Cancún, Mexico	Hard	(Mexico) Fernanda Contreras Gómez	(France) Tiphanie Fiquet (Poland) Daria Kuczer	3–6, 6–4, [10–3]
