= María Fernanda Álvarez Terán =

Bolivian tennis player

María Fernanda Álvarez
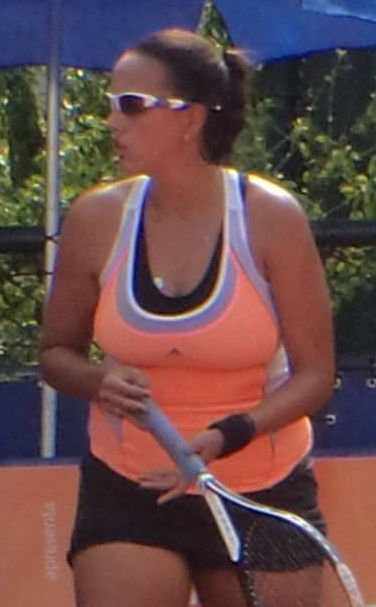
- Álvarez in 2014
- Full name: María Fernanda Álvarez Terán
- Country (sports): Bolivia
- Residence: Santa Cruz, Bolivia
- Born: 28 February 1988 (age 38) Santa Cruz
- Height: 1.74 m (5 ft 9 in)
- Turned pro: 2006
- Plays: Right (two-handed backhand)
- Prize money: $143,924

Singles
- Career record: 291–169
- Career titles: 12 ITF
- Highest ranking: No. 187 (28 September 2009)

Grand Slam singles results
- US Open: Q1 (2009, 2010, 2011)

Doubles
- Career record: 244–122
- Career titles: 24 ITF
- Highest ranking: No. 137 (7 April 2014)

Team competitions
- Fed Cup: 34–33

María Fernanda Álvarez Terán (Note: In this Spanish name, the first or paternal surname is Álvarez and the second or maternal family name is Terán.) (Latin American Spanish: [maˈɾi.a feɾˈnanda ˈalβaɾes teˈɾan]; born 28 February 1989), also known as MFAT, is a former tennis player from Bolivia.

Álvarez was ranked No. 15 in the junior rankings in 2007. She won tournaments including doubles at the Copa Gatorade, Copa Milo in singles, Méditerranée Avenir in doubles, and Raquette D'Or, Riad 21, both in singles, and 21st Copa Gerdau and Condor de Plata, both in doubles.

On the senior tour, her best singles ranking was world No. 187, achieved in September 2009. On 7 April 2014, she peaked at No. 137 in the doubles rankings. Her last match on the ITF Women's Circuit she competed in her hometown Santa Cruz, in December 2016.

Playing for Bolivia Fed Cup team, Álvarez Terán achieved a win–loss record of 34–33.

== ITF Circuit finals ==
=== Singles: 24 (12 titles, 12 runner-ups) ===
Legend $25,000 tournaments $15,000 tournaments $10,000 tournaments	Finals by surface Hard (6–5) Clay (6–7)

Result	No.	Date	Tournament	Surface	Opponent	Score
Win	1.	13 September 2007	ITF Santo Andre, Brazil	Hard	(Argentina) María Irigoyen	6–2, 6–2
Win	2.	4 November 2007	ITF Bogotá, Colombia	Clay	(United States) Nataly Yoo	6–0, 6–0
Win	3.	10 November 2007	ITF Lima, Peru	Clay	(Brazil) Vivian Segnini	7–6^{(9)}, 6–2
Loss	1.	2 December 2007	ITF Mexico City	Hard	(United States) Nicole Gibbs	5–7, 3–6
Win	4.	10 May 2008	ITF Buenos Aires, Argentina	Clay	(Argentina) Andrea Benítez	7–6, 0–6, 6–0
Loss	2.	13 July 2008	ITF Bogotá, Colombia	Clay	(Colombia) Mariana Duque Mariño	0–6, 4–6
Loss	3.	8 November 2008	ITF Asunción, Paraguay	Clay	(Argentina) Lucía Jara Lozano	6–3, 5–7, 3–6
Win	5.	16 November 2008	ITF Querétaro, Mexico	Hard	(United States) Tarakaa Bertrand	6–0, 6–2
Win	6.	23 November 2008	ITF Puebla, Mexico	Hard	(United States) Megan Moulton-Levy	6–4, 3–6, 6–4
Loss	4.	19 July 2009	ITF Bogotá, Colombia	Clay	(Venezuela) Marina Giral Lores	6–1, 4–6, 3–6
Win	7.	2 August 2009	ITF Campos do Jordão, Brazil	Hard	(Brazil) Maria Fernanda Alves	6–3, 6–3
Win	8.	15 August 2009	ITF Buenos Aires, Argentina	Clay	(Argentina) Carla Beltrami	6–4, 1–6, 6–4
Loss	5.	1 August 2010	ITF Campos do Jordão, Brazil	Hard	(Argentina) Aranza Salut	6–2, 5–7, 3–6
Loss	6.	7 August 2010	ITF Santa Cruz, Bolivia	Clay	(Chile) Camila Silva	1–6, 6–4, 1–6
Win	9.	27 March 2011	ITF Poza Rica, Mexico	Hard	(Indonesia) Romana Tedjakusuma	6–3, 6–4
Loss	7.	17 July 2011	ITF Bogotá, Colombia	Clay	(Colombia) Mariana Duque Mariño	6–7, 6–4, 3–6
Win	10.	7 October 2012	ITF Gainesville, United States	Clay	(Brazil) Maria Fernanda Alves	2–6, 6–0, 7–5
Loss	8.	24 November 2012	ITF Temuco, Chile	Clay	(Argentina) Vanesa Furlanetto	3–6, 0–1 ret.
Win	11.	24 May 2015	ITF Antalya, Turkey	Hard	(United Kingdom) Anna Brogan	6–3, 6–4
Loss	9.	31 May 2015	ITF Antalya, Turkey	Hard	(Romania) Irina Bara	7–6^{(2)}, 1–6, 0–6
Loss	10.	16 August 2015	ITF Bursa, Turkey	Hard	(Turkey) Ayla Aksu	3–6, 1–6
Loss	11.	30 August 2015	ITF San Luis Potosí, Mexico	Hard	(Mexico) Victoria Rodríguez	6–7^{(3)}, 6–2, 3–6
Loss	12.	3 October 2015	ITF Santa Fe, Argentina	Clay	(Chile) Daniela Seguel	2–6, 1–6
Win	12.	17 October 2015	ITF São Paulo, Brazil	Clay	(Brazil) Laura Pigossi	2–6, 7–5, 6–4

=== Doubles: 43 (24 titles, 19 runner-ups) ===
Legend $25,000 tournaments $15,000 tournaments $10,000 tournaments	Finals by surface Hard (9–9) Clay (15–10)

Result	No.	Date	Tournament	Surface	Partner	Opponents	Score
Loss	1.	12 May 2006	ITF Rabat, Morocco	Clay	(Romania) Raluca Olaru	(Morocco) Bahia Mouhtassine (France) Émilie Bacquet	w/o
Loss	2.	1 September 2007	ITF Santa Cruz, Bolivia	Clay	(Peru) Claudia Razzeto	(Argentina) Soledad Esperón (Argentina) María Irigoyen	2–6, 2–6
Win	1.	22 September 2007	ITF Itajaí, Brazil	Clay	(Brazil) Carla Tiene	(Argentina) Verónica Spiegel (Argentina) Emilia Yorio	5–7, 6–2, [11–9]
Win	2.	20 October 2007	ITF Valencia, Venezuela	Clay	(Venezuela) Mariana Muci	(United States) Kit Carson (United States) Katie Ruckert	6–1, 6–4
Win	3.	27 October 2007	ITF Valencia, Venezuela	Hard	(Venezuela) Mariana Muci	(Colombia) Karen Castiblanco (Ecuador) Hilda Zuleta Cabrera	4–6, 6–1, [10–7]
Win	4.	4 November 2007	ITF Bogotá, Colombia	Clay	(United States) Nataly Yoo	(Colombia) Marcela Fonseca Villarreal (Colombia) Maria Nivia	6–4, 6–3
Win	5.	9 November 2007	ITF Lima, Peru	Clay	(Peru) Claudia Razzeto	(Brazil) Ana Clara Duarte (Venezuela) Mariana Muci	3–6, 7–6^{(7)}, [10–5]
Loss	3.	1 December 2007	ITF Mexico City	Hard	(Venezuela) Mariana Muci	(Mexico) Lorena Arias (Mexico) Erika Clarke	4–6, 4–6
Loss	4.	15 November 2008	ITF Querétaro, Mexico	Hard	(Croatia) Indire Akiki	(Mexico) Daniela Múñoz Gallegos (Mexico) Erika Clarke	6–7, 6–3, [6–10]
Loss	5.	22 November 2008	ITF Puebla, Mexico	Hard	(Argentina) Verónica Spiegel	(United States) Audra Cohen (United States) Megan Moulton-Levy	2–6, 4–6
Loss	6.	23 May 2009	ITF Santos, Brazil	Clay	(Argentina) María Irigoyen	(Australia) Monique Adamczak (Argentina) Florencia Molinero	6–1, 1–6, [7–10]
Win	6.	5 September 2009	ITF Tsukuba, Japan	Hard	(United Kingdom) Jade Curtis	(Chinese Taipei) Hsu Wen-hsin (Japan) Mari Tanaka	1–6, 6–2, [10–2]
Win	7.	10 October 2009	ITF Mexico City	Hard	(Portugal) Frederica Piedade	(Colombia) Karen Castiblanco (Russia) Alina Jidkova	6–3, 6–4
Loss	7.	31 October 2009	ITF Bayamón, Puerto Rico	Hard	(Colombia) Karen Castiblanco	(United States) Kimberly Couts (Canada) Heidi El Tabakh	3–6, 1–6
Loss	8.	8 May 2010	ITF Rio de Janeiro, Brazil	Clay	(Slovenia) Andreja Klepač	(Peru) Bianca Botto (United Kingdom) Amanda Carreras	3–6, 6–4, [10–8]
Loss	9.	26 November 2010	ITF Barueri, Brazil	Hard	(Argentina) Aranza Salut	(Brazil) Fernanda Faria (Brazil) Paula Cristina Gonçalves	5–7, 6–4, 5–7
Win	8.	2 April 2011	ITF Buenos Aires, Argentina	Clay	(Argentina) Paula Ormaechea	(Argentina) María Irigoyen (Argentina) Florencia Molinero	4–6, 7–5, [10–4]
Loss	10.	6 April 2012	ITF Villa María, Argentina	Clay	(Chile) Camila Silva	(Peru) Patricia Kú Flores (Chile) Daniela Seguel	6–4, 1–6, [4–10]
Loss	11.	13 April 2012	ITF Villa del Dique, Argentina	Clay	(Argentina) Ornella Caron	(Argentina) Vanesa Furlanetto (Argentina) Aranza Salut	w/o
Win	9.	4 May 2012	ITF São José dos Campos, Brazil	Clay	(Venezuela) Gabriela Paz	(Brazil) Carla Forte (Brazil) Laura Pigossi	6–0, 6–3
Win	10.	12 May 2012	ITF Brasília, Brazil	Clay	(Venezuela) Gabriela Paz	(France) Alizé Lim (Bulgaria) Aleksandrina Naydenova	6–2, 6–4
Loss	12.	9 June 2012	ITF El Paso, United States	Hard	(Oman) Fatma Al-Nabhani	(United States) Sanaz Marand (United States) Ashley Weinhold	4–6, 3–6
Win	11.	3 August 2012	ITF Santa Cruz, Bolivia	Clay	(Argentina) Luciana Sarmenti	(Peru) Patricia Kú Flores (Mexico) Victoria Lozano	7–6^{(7)}, 6–4
Win	12.	30 September 2012	ITF Amelia Island, United States	Clay	(Brazil) Maria Fernanda Alves	(United States) Elizabeth Ferris (Ukraine) Anastasia Kharchenko	6–2, 6–2
Win	13.	6 October 2012	ITF Gainesville, United States	Clay	(Russia) Angelina Gabueva	(United States) Kristi Boxx (United States) Keri Wong	7–6^{(7)}, 5–7, [10–7]
Loss	13.	3 November 2012	ITF Buenos Aires, Argentina	Clay	(Brazil) Maria Fernanda Alves	(Romania) Elena Bogdan (Romania) Raluca Olaru	6–1, 2–6, [7–10]
Win	14.	9 November 2012	ITF Asunción, Paraguay	Clay	(South Africa) Chanel Simmonds	(United States) Anamika Bhargava (United States) Sylvia Krywacz	4–6, 6–3, [10–5]
Loss	14.	6 April 2013	ITF Jackson, United States	Clay	(Paraguay) Verónica Cepede Royg	(Belarus) Ilona Kremen (Netherlands) Angelique van der Meet	3–6, 4–6
Win	15.	13 April 2013	ITF Poza Rica, Mexico	Hard	(Brazil) Maria Fernanda Alves	(Canada) Stéphanie Dubois (Ukraine) Olga Savchuk	6–2, 6–3
Win	16.	3 May 2013	ITF Caracas, Venezuela	Hard	(United States) Keri Wong	(Hungary) Naomi Totka (Brazil) Karina Venditti	6–1, 6–2
Win	17.	19 May 2013	ITF Landisville, United States	Hard	(United States) Keri Wong	(United States) Brooke Austin (United States) Brooke Rischbieth	2–6, 6–4, [10–5]
Win	18.	9 June 2013	ITF Las Cruces, United States	Hard	(United States) Keri Wong	(United States) Anamika Bhargava (Japan) Mayo Hibi	6–2, 6–2
Loss	15.	6 July 2013	ITF São José do Rio Preto, Brazil	Clay	(Argentina) Mailen Auroux	(Paraguay) Verónica Cepede Royg (Venezuela) Adriana Pérez	6–4, 4–6, [9–11]
Loss	16.	20 July 2013	ITF Campos do Jordão, Brazil	Hard	(Brazil) Maria Fernanda Alves	(Brazil) Paula Cristina Gonçalves (Argentina) María Irigoyen	5–7, 3–6
Win	19.	9 August 2013	ITF Santa Cruz, Bolivia	Clay	(Bolivia) Daniela Ruiz	(Chile) Cecilia Costa Melgar (Paraguay) Camila Giangreco Campiz	7–5, 6–3
Win	20.	4 October 2013	ITF Victoria, Mexico	Hard	(Argentina) María Irigoyen	(Chinese Taipei) Hsu Chieh-yu (Mexico) Ana Sofía Sánchez	7–6^{(2)}, 6–3
Win	21.	12 October 2013	ITF Tampico, Mexico	Hard	(Argentina) María Irigoyen	(Mexico) Constanza Gorches (Mexico) Victoria Rodríguez	6–3, 6–4
Loss	17.	15 March 2014	ITF São Paulo, Brazil	Clay	(Argentina) María Irigoyen	(Romania) Irina-Camelia Begu (Russia) Alexandra Panova	6–4, 3–6, [11–9]
Loss	18.	30 January 2015	ITF Petit-Bourg, France	Hard	(Brazil) Laura Pigossi	(Canada) Ayan Broomfield (Canada) Marie-Alexandre Leduc	6–2, 4–6, [8–10]
Loss	19.	15 August 2015	ITF Bursa, Turkey	Hard	(Bolivia) Noelia Zeballos	(Germany) Katharina Hering (United Kingdom) Mirabelle Njoze	6–7^{(4)}, 4–6
Win	22.	25 September 2015	ITF San Carlos Centro, Argentina	Clay	(Argentina) Catalina Pella	(Chile) Bárbara Gatica (Argentina) Stephanie Mariel Petit	6–2, 6–0
Win	23.	2 October 2015	ITF Santa Fe, Argentina	Clay	(Brazil) Laura Pigossi	(Argentina) Catalina Pella (Chile) Daniela Seguel	2–6, 6–2, [10–3]
Win	24.	16 October 2015	ITF São Paulo, Brazil	Clay	(Brazil) Laura Pigossi	(Argentina) Melina Ferrero (Argentina) Carla Lucero	6–3, 4–6, [10–5]
