= Paula Cristina Gonçalves =

Brazilian tennis player (born 1990)

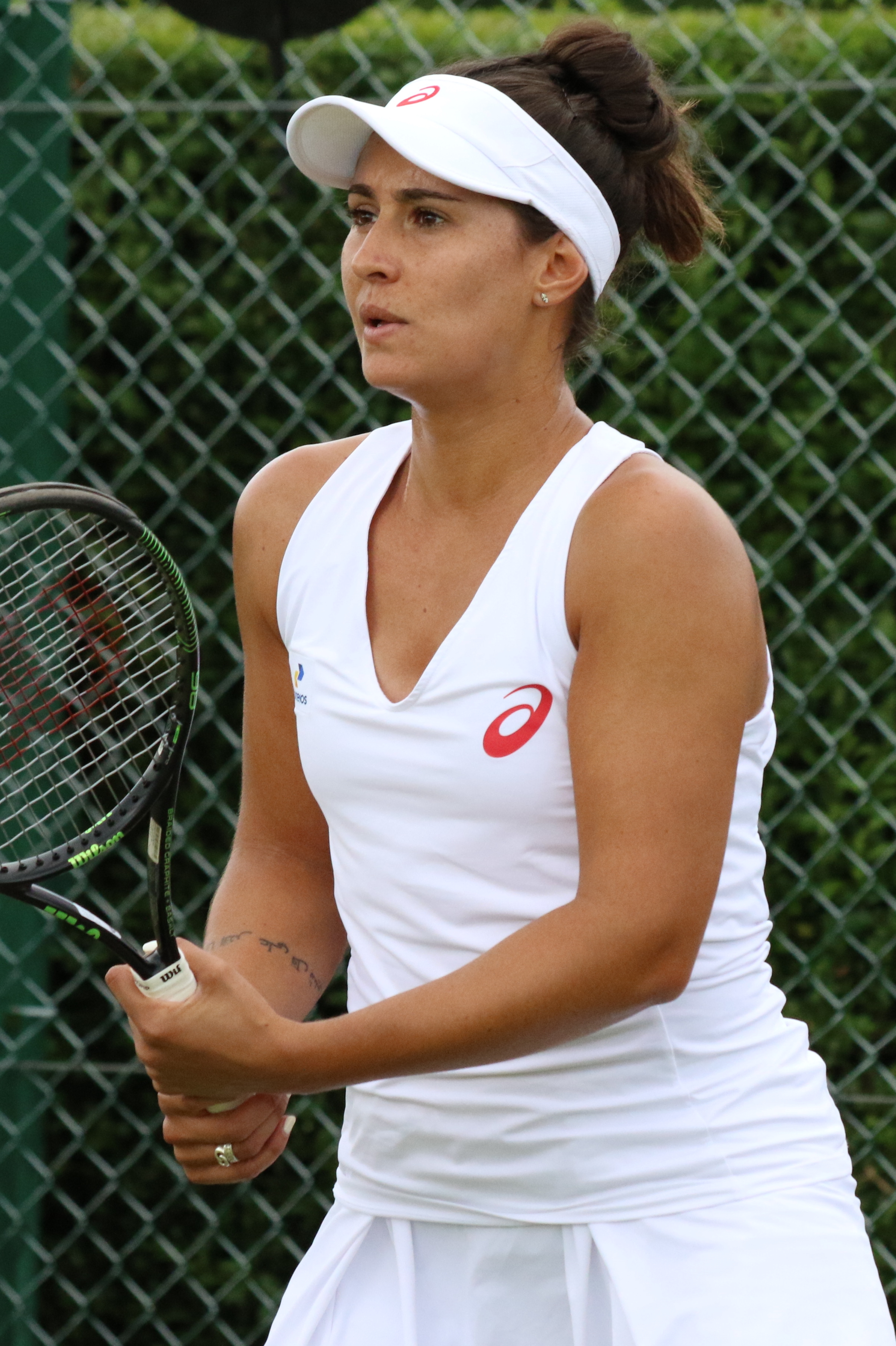
- At Wimbledon, 2016
- Full name: Paula Cristina Araújo Gonçalves
- Country (sports): Brazil
- Residence: São Paulo, Brazil
- Born: 11 August 1990 (age 35) São Paulo
- Height: 1.78 m (5 ft 10 in)
- Plays: Right (two-handed backhand)
- Prize money: US$ 219,377

Singles
- Career record: 320–221
- Career titles: 0
- Highest ranking: No. 158 (15 August 2016)

Grand Slam singles results
- Australian Open: Q2 (2017)
- French Open: Q1 (2016)
- Wimbledon: Q1 (2016)
- US Open: Q1 (2016)

Doubles
- Career record: 227–165
- Career titles: 1
- Highest ranking: No. 95 (29 February 2016)

Other doubles tournaments
- Olympic Games: 1R (2016)

Team competitions
- Fed Cup: 15–4
Medal record
Representing BRA
Women's Tennis
South American Games
Gold medal – first place	2014 Santiago	Singles
Bronze medal – third place	2014 Santiago	Doubles

Paula Cristina de Araújo Gonçalves (born 11 August 1990) is a Brazilian former professional tennis player.

In her career, she won one doubles title on the WTA Tour, as well as seven singles and 24 doubles titles on the ITF Women's Circuit. On 15 August 2016, Gonçalves achieved her career-high singles ranking of world No. 158. On 29 February 2016, she peaked at No. 95 in the doubles rankings.

== Career ==
=== 2015 ===
Gonçalves and Beatriz Haddad Maia won the title on Copa Colsanitas defeating Irina Falconi and Shelby Rogers in the final. This was her first WTA Tour title.

Partnering Sanaz Marand, Gonçalves won her first $75k tournament in September at the Albuquerque defeating Tamira Paszek and Anna Tatishvili in the final.

=== 2016 ===
Paula made her first WTA singles quarterfinal at the Rio Open after straight-sets wins over Shahar Pe'er, Alizé Lim, Julia Glushko, Johanna Larsson. Her run was ended by Shelby Rogers.

She made her first WTA Tour singles semifinal two months later at the Copa Colsanitas after wins over Verónica Cepede Royg, Tatjana Maria and Alexandra Panova.

== WTA Tour finals ==
Legend
Grand Slam tournaments
WTA 1000
WTA 500
WTA 250 / International (Note: The WTA International tournaments were reclassified as WTA 250 tournaments in 2021.)

=== Doubles: 1 (title) ===
Result	Date	Tournament	Tier	Surface	Partner	Opponents	Score
Win	Apr 2015	Copa Colsanitas, Colombia	International	Clay	(Brazil) Beatriz Haddad Maia	(United States) Irina Falconi (United States) Shelby Rogers	6–3, 3–6, [10–6]

== ITF Circuit finals ==
Legend
$75/80,000 tournaments
$50/60,000 tournaments
$25,000 tournaments
$10/15,000 tournaments

=== Singles: 14 (7 titles, 7 runner-ups) ===
Result	W–L	Date	Tournament	Tier	Surface	Opponent	Score
Loss	0–1	Jun 2010	ITF Brasília, Brazil	10,000	Clay	(Brazil) Fernanda Faria	7–6^{(5)}, 3–6, 4–6
Win	1–1	Oct 2011	ITF São Paulo, Brazil	10,000	Clay	(Portugal) Bárbara Luz	6–2, 6–3
Win	2–1	Dec 2012	ITF Santiago, Chile	25,000	Clay	(United States) Julia Cohen	0–6, 6–3, 6–4
Win	3–1	Jul 2013	ITF Campos do Jordão, Brazil	25,000	Hard	(Argentina) María Irigoyen	3–6, 7–5, 6–1
Win	4–1	Apr 2014	ITF São José dos Campos, Brazil	10,000	Clay	(Brazil) Maria Fernanda Alves	6–2, 3–6, 6–2
Loss	4–2	Apr 2014	ITF São José dos Campos, Brazil	10,000	Clay	(Brazil) Gabriela Cé	1–1 ret.
Loss	4–3	Jun 2014	ITF Padua, Italy	25,000	Clay	(United States) Louisa Chirico	2–6, 6–1, 6–7^{(3)}
Loss	4–4	Oct 2015	ITF Florence, United States	25,000	Hard	(United States) Grace Min	2–6, 6–4, 6–7^{(2)}
Win	5–4	Nov 2016	ITF Santiago, Chile	10,000	Clay	(Chile) Daniela Seguel	4–6, 4–4 ret.
Loss	5–5	Dec 2016	ITF Santiago, Chile	25,000	Clay	(Slovenia) Tamara Zidanšek	1–6, 4–6
Win	6–5	Apr 2017	ITF Campinas, Brazil	15,000	Clay	(Argentina) Stephanie Petit	6–4, 6–4
Win	7–5	Aug 2018	ITF Cuneo, Italy	15,000	Clay	(Italy) Bianca Turati	6–4, 6–2
Loss	7–6	Jun 2019	ITF Padua, Italy	25,000	Clay	(Italy) Martina Caregaro	4–6, 4–6
Loss	7–7	Jun 2019	ITF Tarvisio, Italy	25,000	Clay	(Italy) Bianca Turati	3–6, 1–6

=== Doubles: 44 (24 titles, 20 runner-ups) ===
Result	No.	Date	Tournament	Surface	Partner	Opponents	Score
Loss	1.	11 October 2008	ITF Mogi das Cruzes, Brazil	Clay	(Brazil) Monique Albuquerque	(Colombia) Karen Castiblanco (Argentina) Aranza Salut	3–6, 1–6
Loss	2.	1 August 2009	ITF Campos do Jordão, Brazil	Clay	(Brazil) Monique Albuquerque	(Brazil) Larissa Carvalho (Brazil) Vivian Segnini	6–3, 1–6, [7–10]
Loss	3.	5 December 2009	ITF Buenos Aires, Argentina	Clay	(Brazil) Fernanda Faria	(Argentina) Mailen Auroux (Argentina) Veronica Spiegel	0–6, 0–6
Loss	4.	27 March 2010	ITF Gonesse, France	Clay (i)	(Brazil) Fernanda Faria	(France) Audrey Bergot (France) Iryna Brémond	3–6, 3–6
Loss	5.	5 June 2010	ITF São Paulo, Brazil	Clay	(Brazil) Fernanda Faria	(Canada) Ekaterina Shulaeva (Brazil) Roxane Vaisemberg	3–6, 3–6
Win	1.	11 June 2010	ITF Brasília, Brazil	Clay	(Brazil) Fernanda Faria	(Brazil) Gabriella Barbosa-Costa Silva (Brazil) Natalia Cheng	6–4, 6–4
Win	2.	26 July 2010	ITF Campos do Jordão, Brazil	Hard	(Brazil) Fernanda Faria	(Brazil) Monique Albuquerque (Brazil) Roxane Vaisemberg	6–3, 6–2
Loss	6.	7 August 2010	ITF São Paulo, Brazil	Clay	(Brazil) Fernanda Faria	(Brazil) Monique Albuquerque (Brazil) Fernanda Hermenegildo	6–7, 4–6
Win	3.	26 November 2010	ITF Barueri, Brazil	Clay	(Brazil) Fernanda Faria	(Bolivia) María Fernanda Álvarez Terán (Argentina) Aranza Salut	7–5, 4–6, [10–3]
Win	4.	18 June 2011	Open de Montpellier, France	Clay	(Ukraine) Maryna Zanevska	(Romania) Mădălina Gojnea (Spain) Inés Ferrer Suárez	6–4, 7–5
Win	5.	22 July 2011	ITF Ribeirão Preto, Brazil	Clay	(Brazil) Fernanda Faria	(Argentina) Andrea Benítez (Brazil) Raquel Piltcher	2–6, 6–2, [10–6]
Loss	7.	7 October 2011	ITF São Paulo, Brazil	Clay	(Brazil) Flávia Dechandt Araújo	(Brazil) Maria Fernanda Alves (Brazil) Gabriela Cé	2–6, 4–6
Win	6.	28 October 2011	ITF Goiânia, Brazil	Clay	(Brazil) Beatriz Haddad Maia	(Brazil) Flávia Dechandt Araújo (Brazil) Karina Venditti	6–4, 5–7, [12–10]
Loss	8.	21 July 2012	ITF Campos do Jordão, Brazil	Hard	(Brazil) Roxane Vaisemberg	(Australia) Monique Adamczak (Brazil) Maria Fernanda Alves	6–4, 3–6, [3–10]
Win	7.	3 August 2012	ITF São Paulo, Brazil	Clay	(Brazil) Roxane Vaisemberg	(Argentina) Aranza Salut (Argentina) Carolina Zeballos	6–2, 6–2
Loss	9.	30 November 2012	ITF Santiago, Chile	Clay	(Brazil) Roxane Vaisemberg	(Argentina) Mailen Auroux (Argentina) María Irigoyen	4–6, 2–6
Loss	10.	23 March 2013	ITF Innisbrook, United States	Clay	(Argentina) María Irigoyen	(Australia) Ashleigh Barty (France) Alizé Lim	1–6, 3–6
Loss	11.	21 June 2013	Open de Montpellier, France	Clay	(Spain) Inés Ferrer Suárez	(Russia) Irina Khromacheva (Czech Republic) Renata Voráčová	1–6, 4–6
Win	8.	20 July 2013	ITF Campos do Jordão, Brazil	Hard	(Argentina) María Irigoyen	(Bolivia) María Fernanda Álvarez Terán (Brazil) Maria Fernanda Alves	7–5, 6–3
Win	9.	27 September 2013	ITF Sevilla, Spain	Clay	(Argentina) Florencia Molinero	(Chile) Cecilia Costa Melgar (Italy) Gaia Sanesi	6–3, 7–5
Win	10.	13 December 2013	ITF Mata de São João, Brazil	Clay	(Brazil) Laura Pigossi	(Paraguay) Montserrat González (Argentina) Carolina Zeballos	6–2, 6–2
Win	11.	21 December 2013	ITF Bertioga, Brazil	Hard	(Brazil) Laura Pigossi	(Paraguay) Verónica Cepede Royg (Argentina) María Irigoyen	2–6, 6–4, [10–7]
Loss	12.	16 February 2014	ITF São Paulo, Brazil	Clay	(Colombia) Mariana Duque Mariño	(Spain) Beatriz García Vidagany (Germany) Dinah Pfizenmaier	6–7^{(8)}, 6–4, [8–10]
Win	12.	4 April 2014	ITF São José dos Campos, Brazil	Clay	(Brazil) Maria Fernanda Alves	(Brazil) Gabriela Cé (Brazil) Eduarda Piai	7–6^{(0)}, 7–5
Win	13.	11 April 2014	ITF São José do Rio Preto, Brazil	Clay	(Brazil) Maria Fernanda Alves	(Brazil) Carolina Alves (Brazil) Ingrid Martins	6–2, 6–0
Loss	13.	13 June 2014	ITF Padua, Italy	Clay	(Argentina) Florencia Molinero	(Italy) Gioia Barbieri (Georgia (country)) Sofia Shapatava	4–6, 6–0, [12–14]
Win	14.	5 July 2014	ITF Denain, France	Clay	(Argentina) Florencia Molinero	(United Kingdom) Nicola Slater (Australia) Karolina Wlodarczak	7–6^{(3)}, 7–6^{(4)}
Loss	14.	1 February 2015	ITF Sunrise, United States	Clay	(Brazil) Beatriz Haddad Maia	(United States) Katerina Stewart (Russia) Anna Kalinskaya	6–7^{(6)}, 7–5, [6–10]
Loss	15.	13 February 2015	ITF São Paulo, Brazil	Clay	(Argentina) Tatiana Búa	(Montenegro) Danka Kovinić (Romania) Andreea Mitu	2–6, 5–7
Loss	16.	28 February 2015	ITF Campinas, Brazil	Clay	(Venezuela) Andrea Gámiz	(France) Pauline Parmentier (Australia) Olivia Rogowska	5–7, 6–4, [8–10]
Win	15.	29 March 2015	ITF Innisbrook, United States	Clay	(Czech Republic) Petra Krejsová	(Argentina) María Irigoyen (Argentina) Paula Ormaechea	6–2, 6–4
Loss	17.	26 April 2015	Dothan Pro Classic, United States	Clay	(Czech Republic) Petra Krejsová	(United Kingdom) Johanna Konta (United States) Maria Sanchez	3–6, 4–6
Win	16.	27 September 2015	Albuquerque Championships, United States	Hard	(United States) Sanaz Marand	(Austria) Tamira Paszek (United States) Anna Tatishvili	4–6, 6–2, [10–3]
Loss	18.	4 October 2015	Las Vegas Open, United States	Clay	(United States) Sanaz Marand	(United States) Julia Boserup (United States) Nicole Gibbs	3–6, 4–6
Loss	19.	31 October 2015	Tennis Classic of Macon, United States	Hard (i)	(United States) Sanaz Marand	(United States) Jan Abaza (Switzerland) Viktorija Golubic	6–7^{(3)}, 5–7
Win	17.	18 January 2016	ITF Guarujá, Brazil	Hard	(Brazil) Beatriz Haddad Maia	(Brazil) Laura Pigossi (Switzerland) Jil Teichmann	6–7^{(3)}, 7–5, [10–7]
Win	18.	10 July 2017	ITF Turin, Italy	Clay	(Spain) Estrella Cabeza Candela	(Spain) Irene Burillo Escorihuela (Spain) Yvonne Cavallé Reimers	5–7, 6–0, [10–8]
Win	19.	17 July 2017	ITF Imola, Italy	Carpet	(Spain) Estrella Cabeza Candela	(Greece) Eleni Kordolaimi (Australia) Seone Mendez	6–3, 1–6, [10–3]
Loss	20.	28 October 2017	Tennis Classic of Macon, United States	Hard	(United States) Sanaz Marand	(United States) Kaitlyn Christian (United States) Sabrina Santamaria	1–6, 0–6
Win	20.	16 March 2019	ITF São Paulo, Brazil	Clay	(Brazil) Luisa Stefani	(Italy) Martina di Giuseppe (Brazil) Thaisa Grana Pedretti	6–7^{(4)}, 6–0, [10–8]
Win	21.	23 March 2019	ITF Curitiba, Brazil	Clay	(Brazil) Luisa Stefani	(Georgia (country)) Ekaterine Gorgodze (Chile) Daniela Seguel	6–7^{(3)}, 7–6^{(0)}, [10–2]
Win	22.	8 June 2019	Internazionali di Brescia, Italy	Clay	(Venezuela) Andrea Gámiz	(Italy) Anastasia Grymalska (Italy) Giorgia Marchetti	6–3, 4–6, [12–10]
Win	23.	29 June 2019	ITF Tarvisio, Italy	Clay	(Brazil) Gabriela Cé	(Italy) Gloria Ceschi (United States) Rasheeda McAdoo	6–2, 4–6, [10–3]
Win	24.	20 July 2019	ITF Imola, Italy	Carpet	(Switzerland) Nina Stadler	(United States) Rasheeda McAdoo (Egypt) Sandra Samir	6–4, 6–2
