= David Souto =

Venezuelan tennis player (born 1992)

- Country (sports): Venezuela
- Residence: Valencia, Spain
- Born: 26 March 1992 (age 33) Caracas, Venezuela
- Retired: 2018
- Plays: Left-handed (two handed-backhand)
- Prize money: $78,145

Singles
- Career record: 7–5 (at ATP Tour level, Grand Slam level, and in Davis Cup)
- Career titles: 14 ITF
- Highest ranking: No. 208 (21 April 2014)

Grand Slam singles results
- French Open: Q1 (2014)

Doubles
- Career record: 2–0 (at ATP Tour level, Grand Slam level, and in Davis Cup)
- Career titles: 6 ITF
- Highest ranking: No. 307 (28 April 2014)
Medal record
Representing Venezuela
Men's Tennis
South American Games
Gold medal – first place	2014 Santiago	Mixed Doubles
Central American and Caribbean Games
Silver medal – second place	2014 Veracruz	Mixed Doubles
Bronze medal – third place	2014 Veracruz	Doubles
Bronze medal – third place	2014 Veracruz	Team Event
- Last updated on: 27 October 2014.

David Souto (Spanish pronunciation: [daˈβið ˈsowto]; born 26 March 1992 in Caracas) is a Venezuelan former tennis player. He achieved a career-high singles ranking of 208 in the ATP (ATP) on April 21, 2014. He also reached a career-high ATP doubles ranking of 307 on April 28, 2014.

As a junior player, Souto achieved a combined ranking of 10 in 2009.

Souto represented the Venezuela in the Davis Cup competition, where he has a win/loss record of 9–5.
