= Nadia Abdalá =

Mexican tennis player (born 1988)

- Country (sports): Mexico
- Residence: San Diego, California, U.S.
- Born: 14 August 1988 (age 36)
- Height: 6 ft 2 in (1.88 m)
- Turned pro: 2010
- Prize money: $19,887

Singles
- Career record: 60–63
- Career titles: 0
- Highest ranking: No. 517 (9 July 2012)

Doubles
- Career record: 32–36
- Career titles: 1 ITF
- Highest ranking: No. 525 (23 July 2012)

Team competitions
- Fed Cup: 1–3

Nadia Abdala (born August 14, 1988) is a Mexican former professional tennis player and member of the Mexico Fed Cup team.

On July 9, 2012, she reached her highest WTA singles ranking of 517 whilst her best doubles ranking was 525 on July 23, 2012.

== ITF Circuit finals ==
=== Singles: 1 (runner-up) ===
$100,000 tournaments
$75,000 tournaments
$50,000 tournaments
$25,000 tournaments
$10,000 tournaments

Result	No.	Date	Tournament	Surface	Opponent	Score
Loss	1.	23 May 2011	ITF Jakarta, Indonesia	Hard	(China) Zhu Lin	6–7, 3–6

=== Doubles: 4 (1 title, 3 runner-ups) ===
Result	No.	Date	Tournament	Surface	Partner	Opponents	Score
Win	1.	7 June 2009	ITF Amarante, Portugal	Hard	(Mexico) Laila Abdalá	(Spain) Arabela Fernandez-Rabener (South Africa) Monica Gorny	7–6, 6–1
Loss	2.	14 March 2011	ITF Metepec, Mexico	Hard	(France) Virginie Ayassamy	(Indonesia) Romana Tedjakusuma (South Africa) Surina De Beer	2–6, 4–6
Loss	3.	11 December 2011	ITF Quito, Ecuador	Clay	(Brazil) Marina Danzini	(United States) Nicole Robinson (United States) Veronica Corning	3–6, 4–6
Loss	4.	27 May 2012	ITF İzmir, Turkey	Hard	(Russia) Yana Sizikova	(Poland) Sylwia Zagórska (Poland) Natalia Siedliska	4–6, 3–6
