= Camila Silva (tennis) =

Chilean tennis player

- Full name: Camila Silva Espinoza
- Country (sports): Chile
- Born: 30 October 1992 (age 32); Valparaíso, Chile
- Prize money: US$35,151

Singles
- Career record: 108–66
- Career titles: 6 ITF
- Highest ranking: No. 410 (2 May 2011)

Grand Slam singles results
- Australian Open Junior: 1R (2010)
- French Open Junior: 1R (2009)
- Wimbledon Junior: 3R (2009)

Doubles
- Career record: 102–39
- Career titles: 13 ITF
- Highest ranking: No. 422 (1 April 2013)

Grand Slam doubles results
- Australian Open Junior: SF (2010)
- French Open Junior: 2R (2009)
- Wimbledon Junior: 2R (2009)

Team competitions
- Fed Cup: 7–9
Medal record
Representing Chile
South American Games
Silver medal – second place	2014 Santiago	mixed doubles

Camila Silva Espinoza (Spanish pronunciation: [kaˈmila ˈsilβa]; born 30 October 1992) is a Chilean former tennis player.

She won six singles titles and 13 doubles titles on the ITF Circuit. On 2 May 2011, she reached her best singles ranking of world No. 410. On 1 April 2013, she peaked at No. 422 in the doubles rankings.

Playing for Chile Fed Cup team, Silva has a win–loss record of 7–9.

== ITF finals ==
=== Singles: 9 (6–3) ===
Legend $100,000 tournaments $75,000 tournaments $50,000 tournaments $25,000 tournaments $10,000 tournaments	Finals by surface Hard (0–0) Clay (6–3) Grass (0–0) Carpet (0–0)

Result	No.	Date	Tournament	Surface	Opponent	Score
Win	1.	2 August 2010	ITF Santa Cruz, Bolivia	Clay	(Bolivia) María Fernanda Álvarez Terán	6–1, 4–6, 6–1
Win	2.	30 August 2010	ITF Santa Fe, Argentina	Clay	(Argentina) Vanesa Furlanetto	1–6, 6–3, 7–6^{(7)}
Win	3.	8 November 2010	ITF Tandil, Argentina	Clay	(Argentina) Barbara Rush	6–7^{(5)}, 6–3, 6–2
Win	4.	22 November 2010	ITF Concepción, Chile	Clay	(Netherlands) Josanne van Bennekom	6–4, 6–2
Loss	1.	6 December 2010	ITF Talca, Chile	Clay	(Paraguay) Verónica Cepede Royg	6–7^{(2)}, 6–3, 3–6
Win	5.	30 July 2012	ITF Santa Cruz, Bolivia	Clay	(Chile) Cecilia Costa Melgar	6–4, 6–7^{(1)}, 6–3
Loss	2.	17 September 2012	ITF Villa Allende, Argentina	Clay	(Argentina) Catalina Pella	6–3, 5–7, 6–7^{(4)}
Win	6.	29 October 2012	ITF Quillota, Chile	Clay	(Chile) Cecilia Costa Melgar	7–5, 4–6, 6–1
Loss	3.	6 May 2013	ITF Villa María, Argentina	Clay	(Paraguay) Montserrat González	3–6, 6–4, 3–6

=== Doubles: 20 (13–7) ===
Legend $100,000 tournaments $75,000 tournaments $50,000 tournaments $25,000 tournaments $10,000 tournaments	Finals by surface Hard (1–0) Clay (12–7) Grass (0–0) Carpet (0–0)

Outcome	No.	Date	Location	Surface	Partner	Opponents	Score
Winner	1.	10 May 2010	Tortosa, Spain	Clay	(Russia) Avgusta Tsybysheva	(Spain) Montserrat Blasco Fernández (Spain) Arabela Fernández Rabener	6–1, 6–3
Runner-up	1.	19 July 2010	La Paz, Bolivia	Clay	(Chile) Giannina Minieri	(Colombia) Karen Castiblanco (Argentina) Estefanía Donnet	4–6, 3–6
Winner	2.	26 July 2010	Cochabamba, Bolivia	Clay	(Chile) Giannina Minieri	(Colombia) Karen Castiblanco (Argentina) Estefanía Donnet	6–4, 6–1
Winner	3.	30 August 2010	Santa Fe, Argentina	Clay	(Colombia) Karen Castiblanco	(Argentina) Tatiana Búa (Argentina) Aranza Salut	4–6, 6–3, [10–6]
Winner	4.	4 October 2010	Londrina, Brazil	Clay	(Colombia) Karen Castiblanco	(Paraguay) Verónica Cepede Royg (Brazil) Vivian Segnini	6–4, 6–3
Winner	5.	1 November 2010	Cariló, Argentina	Clay	(Argentina) Vanesa Furlanetto	(Argentina) Lucía Jara Lozano (Argentina) Luciana Sarmenti	6–2, 6–1
Runner-up	2.	22 November 2010	Concepción, Chile	Clay	(Colombia) Karen Castiblanco	(Chile) Fernanda Brito (Chile) Daniela Seguel	2–6, 3–6
Runner-up	3.	29 November 2010	Santiago, Chile	Clay	(Argentina) Barbara Rush	(Paraguay) Verónica Cepede Royg (Argentina) Luciana Sarmenti	1–6, 3–6
Runner-up	4.	2 April 2012	Villa María, Argentina	Clay	(Bolivia) María Fernanda Álvarez Terán	(Peru) Patricia Kú Flores (Chile) Daniela Seguel	6–4, 1–6, [4–10]
Winner	6.	14 May 2012	Rosario, Argentina	Clay	(Argentina) Tatiana Búa	(Argentina) Luciana Sarmenti (Chile) Daniela Seguel	6–4, 7–6^{(2)}
Runner-up	5.	16 July 2012	Cochabamba, Bolivia	Clay	(Mexico) Victoria Lozano	(Paraguay) Jazmín Britos (Peru) Katherine Miranda Chang	6–3, 5–7, [5–10]
Winner	7.	23 July 2012	La Paz, Bolivia	Clay	(Mexico) Victoria Lozano	(Venezuela) Gabriela Coglitore (Argentina) Guadalupe Moreno	6–3, 6–2
Winner	8.	3 September 2012	Buenos Aires, Argentina	Clay	(Argentina) Andrea Benítez	(Argentina) Aranza Salut (Mexico) Ana Sofía Sánchez	6–3, 6–0
Winner	9.	29 October 2012	Quillota, Chile	Clay	(Chile) Cecilia Costa Melgar	(Argentina) Sofía Luini (Argentina) Barbara Montiel	6–1, 6–1
Winner	10.	6 May 2013	Villa María, Argentina	Clay	(Mexico) Ana Sofía Sánchez	(Argentina) Victoria Bosio (Argentina) Aranza Salut	6–1, 6–2
Winner	11.	14 October 2013	Pereira, Colombia	Clay	(Ecuador) Doménica González	(Colombia) Sofía Múnera Sánchez (Hungary) Szabina Szlavikovics	6–4, 6–2
Winner	12.	25 October 2013	Bogotá, Colombia	Hard	(Ecuador) Doménica González	(Netherlands) Anna Katalina Alzate Esmurazaeva (Netherlands) Jade Schoelink	6–2, 6–4
Runner-up	6.	29 November 2013	Santiago, Chile	Clay	(Argentina) Guadalupe Moreno	(Argentina) Sofía Luini (Argentina) Ana Madcur	4–6, 7–6^{(5)}, [6–10]
Winner	13.	22 March 2014	Santiago, Chile	Clay	(Chile) Fernanda Brito	(Argentina) Sofía Blanco (Argentina) Nadia Podoroska	1–6, 7–6^{(5)}, [10–7]
Runner-up	7.	8 August 2014	Santa Fe, Argentina	Clay	(Chile) Fernanda Brito	(Argentina) Ana Victoria Gobbi Monllau (Argentina) Guadalupe Pérez Rojas	3–6, 2–6
