= Verónica Cepede Royg =

Paraguayan tennis player (born 1992)

Verónica Cepede
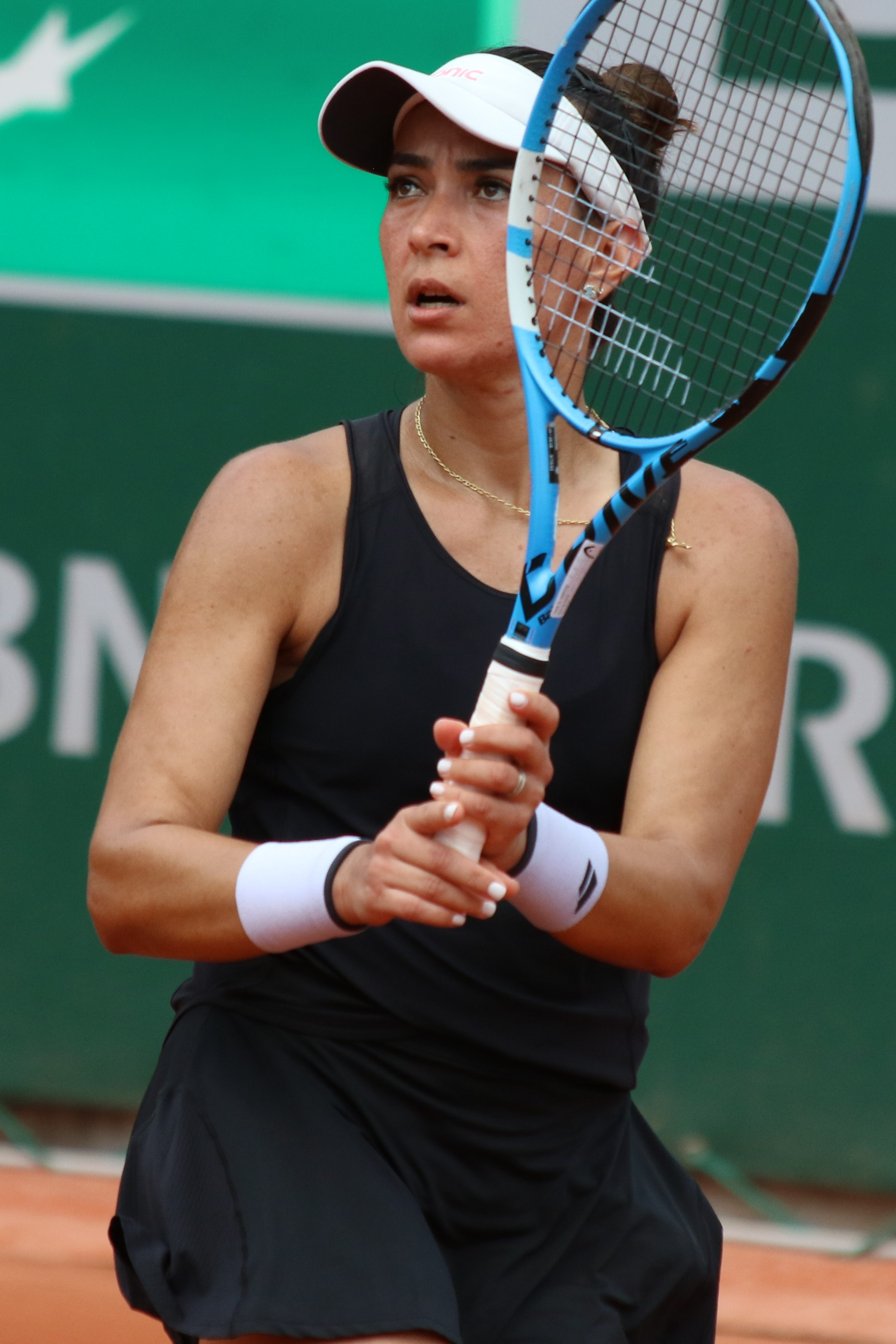
- Cepede at 2022 French Open
- Full name: Verónica Cepede Royg
- Country (sports): Paraguay
- Residence: Asunción, Paraguay
- Born: 21 January 1992 (age 34) Asunción
- Height: 1.63 m (5 ft 4 in)
- Retired: 2022
- Plays: Right (two-handed backhand)
- Coach: Ramón Delgado
- Prize money: $1,378,187

Singles
- Career record: 401–271
- Career titles: 14 ITF
- Highest ranking: No. 73 (7 August 2017)

Grand Slam singles results
- Australian Open: 1R (2018)
- French Open: 4R (2017)
- Wimbledon: 1R (2017, 2018)
- US Open: 1R (2017)

Other tournaments
- Olympic Games: 1R (2012, 2016, 2021)

Doubles
- Career record: 180–96
- Career titles: 1 WTA, 1 WTA Challenger
- Highest ranking: No. 85 (19 September 2016)

Grand Slam doubles results
- Wimbledon: 1R (2017)

Team competitions
- Fed Cup: 61–26
Medal record
Women's tennis
Representing Paraguay
Pan American Games
Bronze medal – third place	2015 Toronto	Mixed doubles
Silver medal – second place	2019 Lima	Women's doubles
Bronze medal – third place	2019 Lima	Women's singles
South American Games
Gold medal – first place	2022 Asunción	Mixed doubles
Silver medal – second place	2010 Medellín	Singles
Silver medal – second place	2014 Santiago	Singles
Silver medal – second place	2014 Santiago	Doubles
Silver medal – second place	2022 Asunción	Singles

Verónica Cepede Royg (Latin American Spanish: [beˈɾonika seˈpeðe ˈrojɣ]; born 21 January 1992) is a Paraguayan former tennis player.

== Career overview ==
On 7 August 2017, she reached her highest WTA singles ranking of No. 73. Her best doubles ranking is No. 85, achieved on 19 September 2016. Cepede Royg has won one doubles title on the WTA Tour, one WTA 125 doubles title, and 14 singles titles and 20 doubles titles on ITF tournaments. Playing for Paraguay Fed Cup team, Cepede Royg has a win–loss record of 61–26. She participated in the 2012 London Olympics, losing in the opening round to American Varvara Lepchenko in three sets, as well as the 2016 Rio Olympics and 2020 Tokyo Olympics. Her best performance at a Grand Slam championship was reaching the fourth round of the 2017 French Open.

== Personal life and background ==
Her father, Eduardo, owns a gas station, while her mother, Edith, is a retired dentist. Her brother Andres is an economist and her sister, Estefania, is an architect. She was introduced to tennis at age five by her siblings. She stated that her favorite shot is the forehand, her favorite tournament is Roland Garros, while her favorite surface is clay. Her tennis idols growing up were Roger Federer and Kim Clijsters. If Cepede Royg had not been a tennis player, she would have become a nutritionist.

== Performance timelines ==
Key
W	F	SF	QF	#R	RR	Q#	DNQ	A	NH

(W) winner; (F) finalist; (SF) semifinalist; (QF) quarterfinalist; (#R) rounds 4, 3, 2, 1; (RR) round-robin stage; (Q#) qualification round; (DNQ) did not qualify; (A) absent; (NH) not held; (SR) strike rate (events won / competed); (W–L) win–loss record.
To avoid confusion and double counting, these charts are updated at the conclusion of a tournament or when the player's participation has ended.

Only main-draw results in WTA Tour, Grand Slam tournaments, Fed Cup/Billie Jean King Cup, and Olympic Games are included in win–loss records.

=== Singles ===
Tournament	2012	2013	2014	2015	2016	2017	2018	2019	2020	2021	2022	SR	W–L	Win%
Grand Slam tournaments
Australian Open	A	A	A	Q1	Q1	A	1R	Q1	Q1	Q2	Q1	0 / 1	0–1	0%
French Open	Q3	Q1	Q1	1R	2R	4R	1R	Q1	A	Q2	Q2	0 / 4	4–4	50%
Wimbledon	Q1	Q1	Q3	Q3	Q1	1R	1R	Q1	NH	Q1	Q1	0 / 2	0–2	0%
US Open	Q3	Q1	Q3	Q1	Q1	1R	Q1	Q2	A	Q1	A	0 / 1	0–1	0%
Win–loss	0–0	0–0	0–0	0–1	1–1	3–3	0–3	0–0	0–0	0–0	0–0	0 / 8	4–8	33%
National representation
Summer Olympics	1R	NH			1R	NH				1R		0 / 3	0–3	0%
WTA 1000
Indian Wells Open	A	A	A	A	Q2	Q1	1R	A	NH	A	A	0 / 1	0–1	0%
Miami Open	A	A	A	A	A	2R	1R	A	NH	A	A	0 / 2	1–2	33%
Canadian Open	A	A	Q1	A	Q2	Q1	Q1	A	NH	A	A	0 / 0	0–0	–
Cincinnati Open	A	A	A	A	A	1R	A	A	A	A	A	0 / 1	0–1	0%
China Open	A	A	A	A	A	Q1	A	A	NH		A	0 / 0	0–0	–
Career statistics
Tournaments	1	0	3	3	9	14	13	1	0	1	0	Career total: 45		
Overall win–loss	0–1	0–0	1–3	3–3	6–9	12–14	4–13	1–2	1–0	0–1	0–0	0 / 45	28–46	38%
Year-end ranking	183	208	138	153	116	77	146	146	174	208	371	$1,226,061		

=== Doubles ===
Tournament	2014	2015	2016	2017	2018	2019	2020	2021	2022	SR	W–L
Australian Open	A	A	A	A	A	A	A	A	A	0 / 0	0–0
French Open	A	A	A	A	A	A	A	A	A	0 / 0	0–0
Wimbledon	A	A	Q1	1R	A	A	NH	A	A	0 / 1	0–1
US Open	A	A	A	A	A	A	A	A	A	0 / 0	0–0
Win–loss	0–0	0–0	0–0	0–1	0–0	0–0	0–0	0–0	0–0	0 / 1	0–1
Career statistics
Tournaments	1	2	7	6	2	0	0	0	0	Career total: 18	
Finals	0	0	1	0	0	0	0	0	0	Career total: 1	
Titles	0	0	1	2	0	0	0	0	0	Career total: 3	
Overall win–loss	1–1	1–2	9–6	7–6	0–2	0–0	0–1	0–0	0–0	1 / 18	18–18
Year-end ranking	120	205	95	162	743	812	850	828	-		

== WTA Tour finals ==
=== Doubles: 3 (1 title, 2 runner-ups) ===
Legend WTA 500 WTA 250 (1–2)	Finals by surface Hard (0–1) Clay (1–1)

Result	W–L	Date	Tournament	Tier	Surface	Partner	Opponents	Score
Win	1–0	Feb 2016	Rio Open, Brazil	International (Note: The WTA International tournaments were reclassified as WTA 250 tournaments in 2021.)	Clay	(Argentina) María Irigoyen	(United Kingdom) Tara Moore (Switzerland) Conny Perrin	6–1, 7–6^{(7–5)}
Loss	1–1	Mar 2017	Abierto Mexicano, Mexico	International	Hard	(Colombia) Mariana Duque Mariño	(Croatia) Darija Jurak (Australia) Anastasia Rodionova	3–6, 2–6
Loss	1–2	Apr 2017	Copa Colsanitas, Colombia	International	Clay	(Poland) Magda Linette	(Brazil) Beatriz Haddad Maia (Argentina) Nadia Podoroska	3–6, 6–7^{(4–7)}

== WTA 125 finals ==
=== Doubles: 1 (title) ===
Result	W–L	Date	Tournament	Surface	Partner	Opponents	Score
Win	1–0	Nov 2015	Carlsbad Classic, United States	Hard	(Brazil) Gabriela Cé	(Germany) Tatjana Maria (Georgia (country)) Oksana Kalashnikova	1–6, 6–4, [10–8]

== ITF Circuit finals ==
Legend
$100,000 tournaments
$75/80,000 tournaments
$50/60,000 tournaments
$25,000 tournaments
$10,000 tournaments

=== Singles: 28 (14 titles, 14 runner-ups) ===
Result	W–L	Date	Tournament	Tier	Surface	Opponent	Score
Win	1–0	Oct 2009	ITF Bauru, Brazil	10,000	Clay	(Brazil) Vivian Segnini	6–0, 6–3
Win	2–0	Oct 2009	ITF Santa Cruz, Bolivia	10,000	Clay	(Brazil) Vivian Segnini	6–2, 6–2
Loss	2–1	Nov 2009	ITF Lima, Peru	10,000	Clay	(Argentina) Carla Lucero	7–5, 3–6, 5–7
Win	3–1	Dec 2009	ITF La Serena, Chile	10,000	Clay	(Argentina) Barbara Rush	6–1, 6–4
Loss	3–2	Oct 2010	ITF Londrina, Brazil	10,000	Clay	(Brazil) Teliana Pereira	4–6, 0–6
Loss	3–3	Nov 2010	ITF Asunción, Paraguay	10,000	Clay	(Argentina) Vanesa Furlanetto	6–1, 4–6, 5–7
Win	4–3	Nov 2010	ITF Asunción, Paraguay	10,000	Clay	(Argentina) Tatiana Búa	6–2, 6–2
Loss	4–4	Dec 2010	ITF Santiago, Chile	10,000	Clay	(Chile) Andrea Koch Benvenuto	2–6, 2–6
Win	5–4	Dec 2010	ITF Talca, Chile	10,000	Clay	(Chile) Camila Silva	7–6^{(2)}, 3–6, 6–3
Win	6–4	Feb 2011	ITF Buenos Aires, Argentina	10,000	Clay	(Brazil) Nathalia Rossi	4–1 ret.
Loss	6–5	Apr 2011	ITF Córdoba, Argentina	10,000	Clay	(Chile) Daniela Seguel	6–7^{(4)}, 6–0, 4–6
Win	7–5	May 2011	ITF Encarnación, Paraguay	10,000	Clay	(Argentina) Ornella Carón	6–2, 6–2
Win	8–5	Jun 2011	ITF Campos do Jordão, Brazil	25,000	Hard	(Venezuela) Adriana Pérez	7–6^{(7)}, 7–5
Win	9–5	Dec 2011	ITF Santiago, Chile	25,000	Clay	(Argentina) Mailen Auroux	6–0, 1–6, 6–3
Win	10–5	Nov 2012	ITF Asunción, Paraguay	25,000	Clay	(Romania) Raluca Olaru	5–7, 7–6^{(9)}, 6–2
Loss	10–6	Jul 2013	ITF Campinas, Brazil	25,000	Clay	(Argentina) María Irigoyen	2–6, 2–6
Loss	10–7	Oct 2013	ITF Asunción, Paraguay	25,000	Clay	(Argentina) Florencia Molinero	3–6, 6–7
Win	11–7	Oct 2013	ITF Caracas, Venezuela	25,000	Hard	(Brazil) Laura Pigossi	6–2, 6–2
Win	12–7	Dec 2013	ITF Santiago, Chile	25,000	Clay	(Argentina) María Irigoyen	6–3, 6–4
Win	13–7	Mar 2014	Open Medellín, Colombia	50,000	Clay	(Romania) Irina-Camelia Begu	6–4, 4–6, 6–4
Loss	13–8	Apr 2015	Open Medellín, Colombia	50,000	Clay	(Brazil) Teliana Pereira	6–7^{(6)}, 1–6
Win	14–8	Dec 2015	ITF Santiago, Chile	25,000	Clay	(Germany) Anne Schäfer	6–0, 2–6, 7–5
Loss	14–9	Sep 2016	Albuquerque Championships, US	75,000	Hard	(Luxembourg) Mandy Minella	4–6, 5–7
Loss	14–10	May 2017	Empire Slovak Open, Slovakia	100,000	Clay	(Czech Republic) Markéta Vondroušová	5–7, 6–7^{(3)}
Loss	14–11	May 2018	Empire Slovak Open	100,000	Clay	(Slovakia) Viktória Kužmová	4–6, 6–1, 1–6
Loss	14–12	Oct 2018	Classic of Macon, United States	80,000	Hard	(United States) Varvara Lepchenko	4–6, 4–6
Loss	14–13	Mar 2019	ITF Irapuato, Mexico	25,000	Hard	(Australia) Astra Sharma	7–6^{(3)}, 4–6, 3–6
Loss	14–14	Nov 2021	Copa Colina, Chile	60,000+H	Clay	(Hungary) Anna Bondár	2–6, 3–6

=== Doubles: 33 (20 titles, 13 runner-ups) ===
Result	W–L	Date	Tournament	Tier	Surface	Partner	Opponents	Score
Win	1–0	Dec 2009	ITF La Serena, Chile	10,000	Clay	(Chile) Fernanda Brito	(Chile) Andrea Koch Benvenuto (Chile) Giannina Minieri	4–6, 6–0, [10–6]
Loss	1–1	Oct 2010	ITF Londrina, Brazil	10,000	Clay	(Brazil) Vivian Segnini	(Colombia) Karen Castiblanco (Chile) Camila Silva	4–6, 3–6
Win	2–1	Oct 2010	ITF Santa Maria, Brazil	10,000	Clay	(Brazil) Vivian Segnini	(Brazil) Natasha Lotuffo (Brazil) Roxane Vaisemberg	w/o
Win	3–1	Nov 2010	ITF Asunción, Paraguay	10,000	Clay	(Argentina) Vanesa Furlanetto	(Argentina) Luciana Sarmenti (Argentina) Carolina Zeballos	6–0, 6–3
Win	4–1	Nov 2010	ITF Asunción, Paraguay	10,000	Clay	(Argentina) Vanesa Furlanetto	(Argentina) Lucía Jara-Lozano (Argentina) Luciana Sarmenti	6–2, 2–6, [10–3]
Win	5–1	Dec 2010	ITF Santiago, Chile	10,000	Clay	(Argentina) Luciana Sarmenti	(Argentina) Barbara Rush (Chile) Camila Silva	6–1, 6–3
Win	6–1	Dec 2010	ITF Talca, Chile	10,000	Clay	(Argentina) Luciana Sarmenti	(Brazil) Flávia Guimarães Bueno (Chile) Belén Ludueña	6–3, 6–1
Win	7–1	Feb 2011	ITF Buenos Aires, Argentina	10,000	Clay	(Argentina) Luciana Sarmenti	(Chile) Fernanda Brito (Argentina) Catalina Pella	6–0, 6–3
Win	8–1	Feb 2011	ITF Buenos Aires, Argentina	10,000	Clay	(Argentina) Luciana Sarmenti	(Argentina) Andrea Benítez (Argentina) Tatiana Búa	5–7, 6–3, [10–7]
Win	9–1	Apr 2011	ITF Córdoba, Argentina	10,000	Clay	(Argentina) Luciana Sarmenti	(Argentina) Sofía Luini (Argentina) Aranza Salut	6–2, 6–0
Win	10–1	May 2011	ITF Encarnación, Paraguay	10,000	Clay	(Argentina) Luciana Sarmenti	(Argentina) Ornella Carón (Argentina) Jordana Luján	6–3, 6–2
Win	11–1	Jun 2011	ITF Rome, Italy	25,000	Clay	(Argentina) Paula Ormaechea	(Russia) Marina Shamayko (Georgia (country)) Sofia Shapatava	7–5, 6–4
Win	12–1	Jul 2011	ITF Denain, France	25,000	Clay	(Brazil) Teliana Pereira	(France) Céline Ghesquière (France) Elixane Lechemia	6–1, 6–1
Loss	12–2	Feb 2012	ITF Bertioga, Brazil	25,000	Hard	(Argentina) Florencia Molinero	(Argentina) Mailen Auroux (Argentina) María Irigoyen	3–6, 1–6
Loss	12–3	Apr 2012	ITF Caracas, Venezuela	25,000	Hard	(Venezuela) Adriana Pérez	(Argentina) Mailen Auroux (Argentina) María Irigoyen	4–6, 3–6
Loss	12–4	May 2012	ITF Rosario, Argentina	25,000	Hard	(Argentina) Luciana Sarmenti	(Brazil) Teliana Pereira (Austria) Nicole Rottmann	2–6, 5–7
Loss	12–5	Jun 2012	ITF Zlín, Czech Republic	25,000	Clay	(Brazil) Teliana Pereira	(Bulgaria) Elitsa Kostova (Bosnia and Herzegovina) Jasmina Tinjić	4–6, 6–1, [10–8]
Loss	12–6	Mar 2013	Osprey Challenger, US	50,000	Clay	(Spain) Inés Ferrer Suárez	(United States) Raquel Kops-Jones (United States) Abigail Spears	1–6, 3–6
Loss	12–7	Apr 2013	ITF Jackson, US	25,000	Clay	(Bolivia) María Fernanda Álvarez	(Belarus) Ilona Kremen (Netherlands) Angelique van der Meet	3–6, 4–6
Win	13–7	Jul 2013	ITF São José do Rio Preto, Brazil	25,000	Clay	(Venezuela) Adriana Pérez	(Argentina) Mailen Auroux (Bolivia) María Fernanda Álvarez	4–6, 6–4, [11–9]
Win	14–7	Jul 2013	ITF Campinas, Brazil	25,000	Clay	(Venezuela) Adriana Pérez	(Argentina) Florencia Molinero (Argentina) Carolina Zeballos	6–0, 6–1
Win	15–7	Oct 2013	ITF Caracas, Venezuela	25,000	Hard	(Venezuela) Adriana Pérez	(Argentina) Florencia Molinero (Brazil) Laura Pigossi	6–3, 6–3
Win	16–7	Dec 2013	ITF Santiago, Chile	25,000	Clay	(Argentina) María Irigoyen	(Chile) Cecilia Costa Melgar (Chile) Daniela Seguel	2–6, 6–4, [10–5]
Loss	16–8	Dec 2013	ITF Bertioga, Brazil	25,000	Hard	(Argentina) María Irigoyen	(Brazil) Paula Cristina Gonçalves (Brazil) Laura Pigossi	6–4, 2–6, [7–10]
Win	17–8	May 2014	Open Saint-Gaudens, France	50,000	Clay	(Argentina) María Irigoyen	(Canada) Sharon Fichman (United Kingdom) Johanna Konta	7–5, 6–3
Win	18–8	May 2014	Grado Tennis Cup, Italy	25,000	Clay	(Liechtenstein) Stephanie Vogt	(Spain) Lara Arruabarrena (Argentina) Florencia Molinero	6–4, 6–2
Loss	18–9	Jun 2014	Nottingham Open, UK	50,000	Grass	(Liechtenstein) Stephanie Vogt	(Australia) Jarmila Gajdošová (Australia) Arina Rodionova	6–7^{(0)}, 1–6
Loss	18–10	Jun 2014	Reinert Open, Germany	50,000	Clay	(Liechtenstein) Stephanie Vogt	(Canada) Gabriela Dabrowski (Colombia) Mariana Duque Mariño	4–6, 2–6
Win	19–10	Sep 2014	Las Vegas Open, US	50,000	Hard	(Argentina) María Irigoyen	(United States) Asia Muhammad (United States) Maria Sanchez	6–3, 5–7, [11–9]
Win	20–10	Nov 2014	John Newcombe Challenge, US	50,000	Hard	(Colombia) Mariana Duque	(United States) Alexa Glatch (United States) Bernarda Pera	6–0, 6–3
Loss	20–11	Mar 2015	Osprey Challenger, US	50,000	Clay	(Argentina) María Irigoyen	(Ukraine) Anhelina Kalinina (Ukraine) Oleksandra Korashvili	1–6, 4–6
Loss	20–12	Oct 2015	Abierto Tampico, Mexico	50,000	Hard	(Russia) Marina Melnikova	(Argentina) María Irigoyen (Czech Republic) Barbora Krejčíková	5–7, 2–6
Loss	20–13	Mar 2019	ITF Irapuato, Mexico	25,000	Hard	(Czech Republic) Renata Voráčová	(Australia) Astra Sharma (New Zealand) Paige Hourigan	1–6, 6–4, [10–12]

== Notes ==
Olympic Games
Preceded by Julieta Granada	Flagbearer for Paraguay (with Fabrizio Zanotti); Tokyo 2020	Succeeded by Alejandra Alonso; Fabrizio Zanotti
